= List of Malayalam films of 1982 =

The following is a list of Malayalam films released in the year 1982.

Opening		Sl. No.	Film	Cast	Director	Music director	Notes
J A N	8	1	Nagamadathu Thampuratti	Prem Nazir, Jayabharathi	J. Sasikumar	M. K. Arjunan	
J A N	8	2	Balloon	Mammootty, Mukesh	Ravi Gupthan	M. K. Arjunan	
J A N	8	3	Lahari	Prema, Radhakrishnan	T. K. Ramchand	G. Devarajan	
J A N	22	4	Mazhu	Sathaar, Sukumaran	P. K. Krishnan	Shyam	
J A N	22	5	Ilakkangal	Nedumudi Venu, Sudha	Mohan	M. B. Sreenivasan	
J A N	22	6	Dhrohi	Prem Nazir, Jagathy Sreekumar	P. Chandrakumar	A. T. Ummer	
J A N	22	7	Pokkuveyil	Balachandran Chullikkad, Kalpana	G. Aravindan	Balachandran Chullikkad	
J A N	26	8	Idiyum Minnalum	Prem Nazir, Srividya, Mammootty, Ratheesh	P. G. Vishwambharan	Shyam	
F E B	12	9	Anthiveyilile Ponnu	Jagathy Sreekumar, Kalpana	Radhakrishnan (RK)	Salil Chowdhary	
F E B	12	10	Yagam	Kalpana, Aranmula Ponnamma	Sivan	M. G. Radhakrishnan	
F E B	12	11	Shila		Augustine Prakash	A. T. Ummer	
F E B	12	12	Chaappa	Beena, Hari	P. A. Bakker		
F E B	19	13	Niram Marunna Nimishangal	Jayabharathi, Sukumaran	Mohan	Shyam	
F E B	20	14	Thuranna Jail	Jayabharathi, Sathaar	J. Sasikumar	Johnson	
F E B	20	15	Kelkkaatha Sabdham	Mohanlal, Nedumudi Venu	Balachandra Menon	Johnson	
F E B	26	16	Chilanthivala	M. N. Nambiar, Captain Raju	Vijayanand	Guna Singh	
F E B	26	17	Theeraatha Bandhangal	Babu Joseph, Salini	Dr. Joshua	K. Raghavan	
F E B	26	18	Ponnum Poovum	Mammootty, Nedumudi Venu	A. Vincent	K. Raghavan	
M A R	12	19	Kazhumaram	Sukumaran, Sumalatha	A. B. Raj	Shankar–Ganesh	
M A R	12	20	Odukkam Thudakkam	Ratheesh, Kalaranjini	Malayattoor Ramakrishnan	G. Devarajan	
M A R	19	21	Maattuvin Chattangale	Jose Prakash, Kamal Haasan	K. G. Rajasekharan	Shankar–Ganesh	
M A R	19	22	Bheeman	Kaviyoor Ponnamma Beeman Raku Pappu Balan K. Nair Kaviyoor Ponnamma, Sathaar	Hassan	A. T. Ummer	
M A R	19	23	Football	Nedumudi Venu, Zarina Wahab	Radhakrishnan (RK)	Johnson	
A P R	2	24	Ethiraalikal	Sukumaran, Soman	Jeassy	A. T. Ummer	
A P R	8	25	Gaanam	Jagathy Sreekumar, Adoor Bhasi	Sreekumaran Thampi	V. Dakshinamoorthy	
A P R	8	26	Anguram	Prem Nazir, Sharada	Hariharan	M. S. Viswanathan	
A P R	8	27	Ivan Oru Simham	Prem Nazir, Srividya	N. P. Suresh	A. T. Ummer	
A P R	9	28	Dheera	Sukumaran, Ambika	Joshiy	Raghu Kumar	
A P R	14	29	Ee Nadu	Mammootty, Ratheesh	I. V. Sasi	Shyam	
A P R	23	30	Kaalam	Ravindran, Menaka	Hemachandran	Shankar–Ganesh	
A P R	30	31	Yavanika	Bharath Gopi, Mammootty	K. G. George	M. B. Sreenivasan	
A P R	30	32	Elippathayam	Karamana Janardanan Nair, Sharada	Adoor Gopalakrishnan	M. B. Sreenivasan	National Film Award for Best Feature Film
M A Y	7	33	Kilukilukkam	Balachandra Menon, Shanthi Krishna	Balachandra Menon	Johnson	
M A Y	7	34	Komaram	Jayan, Mammootty	J. C. George	Kottayam Joy	
M A Y	7	35	Idavela	Ashokan, Idavela Babu	Mohan	M. B. Sreenivasan	
M A Y	14	36	Sharam	Sukumaran, Srividya	Joshiy	K. J. Joy	
M A Y	21	37	Aranjaanam	Shankar, Rajkumar	P. Venu	K. J. Joy	
M A Y	21	38	Ente Sathrukkal	Jayan	S. Babu	M. K. Arjunan	
M A Y	28	39	Sheshakriya	Aranmula Hariharaputhran, Jalaja	Ravi Alummoodu		
M A Y	28	40	Kayam	Shankar, Jagathy Sreekumar, Cochin Haneefa	P. K. Joseph	M. K. Arjunan	
J U N	2	41	Chambalkadu	Prem Nazir, Ratheesh, Mammootty	K. G. Rajasekharan	M. K. Arjunan	
J U N	2	42	Koritharicha Naal	Adoor Bhasi, Balan K. Nair	J. Sasikumar	M. K. Arjunan	
J U N	10	43	Aayudham	Madhu, K. R. Vijaya	P. Chandrakumar	A. T. Ummer	
J U N	25	44	Palangal	Nedumudi Venu, Shankar, Gopi, Zarina Wahab	Bharathan	Johnson	
J U L	2	45	Ithum Oru Jeevitham	Jagathy Sreekumar, Thikkurissy Sukumaran Nair	Veliyam Chandran	R. Somasekharan	
J U L	9	46	Chillu	Sukumari, Jagathy Sreekumar	Lenin Rajendran	M. B. Sreenivasan	
J U L	9	47	Angachamayam	Prem Nazir, Swapna	Rajaji Babu	G. Devarajan	
J U L	9	48	Mylanji		M. Krishnan Nair	A. T. Ummer	
J U L	23	49	Oru Thira Pinneyum Thira	Prem Nazir, Mammootty, Ratheesh	P. G. Vishwambharan	Shyam	
J U L	23	50	Saravarsham	Sukumaran, Mammootty	Baby	Shyam	
J U L	30	51	Jumbulingam	Prem Nazir, Jayabharathi	J. Sasikumar	M. K. Arjunan	
J U L	30	52	Ponmudy	Prem Nazir, Sharada	N. Sankaran Nair	Jithin Shyam	
A U G	5	53	Marupacha	Prem Nazir, Prem Nazir	S. Babu	A. T. Ummer	
A U G	5	54	Ithu Njangalude Katha	Sreenath, Mukesh	P. G. Viswambharan	Johnson	
A U G	5	55	Aalolam	Nedumudi Venu, Bharath Gopi	Mohan	Ilaiyaraaja	
A U G	6	56	Kaaliya Mardhanam	Mohanlal, Nedumudi Venu	J. Williams	K. J. Joy	
A U G	6	57	Enthino Pookunna Pookkal	Mohanlal, Mammootty, Ratheesh	Gopinath Babu	Shyam	
A U G	20	58	Madrasile Mon	Ravikumar, Raveendran	J. Sasikumar	Paravur Devarajan	
A U G	20	59	Ezham Rathri	Kamal Haasan	Krishnakumar	Ilaiyaraaja	
A U G	26	60	Karthavyam	Madhu, Jagathy Sreekumar	Joshiy	Sathyam	
A U G	27	61	Novemberinte Nashtam	Madhavi, Ramachandran. V	P. Padmarajan	M. G. Radhakrishnan	
A U G	27	62	Paanjajanyam	Prem Nazir, Swapna	K. G. Rajasekharan	Shankar–Ganesh	
A U G	27	63	Olangal	Amol Palekar, Poornima Jayaram	Balu Mahendra	Ilaiyaraaja	
S E P	1	64	Ina	Master Raghu, Devi	I. V. Sasi	A. T. Ummer	
S E P	1	65	Padayottam	Prem Nazir, Madhu, Shankar	Jijo Punnoose	Guna Singh	
S E P	1	66	Aarambham	Prem Nazir, Madhu	Joshiy	Shyam	
S E P	17	67	Preeyasakhi Radha	Lakshmi, Prathap Pothen	K. P. Pillai	V. Dakshinamoorthy	
S E P	17	68	Vidhichathum Kothichathum	Mammootty, Ratheesh	T. S. Mohan	Raveendran	
S E P	24	69	Post Mortem	Prem Nazir, Sukumaran	J. Sasikumar	K. J. Joy	
S E P	24	70	John Jaffer Janardhanan	Mammootty, Ratheesh, Ravindran	I. V. Sasi	Shyam	
O C T	1	71	Aadharsam	Prem Nazir, Jayabharathi	Joshiy	Shyam	
O C T	1	72	Amrutha Geetham	Nedumudi Venu, Mammootty, Ratheesh	Baby	G. Devarajan	
O C T	2	73	Aakrosham	Prem Nazir, Srividya	A. B. Raj	Ben Surendar	
O C T	10	74	Ormakkayi	Bharath Gopi, Madhavi	Bharathan	Johnson	
O C T	10	75	Mathruka Kudumbam		M. Krishnan Nair		
O C T	14	76	Mukhangal		P. Chandrasekhar	A. T. Ummer	
O C T	21	77	Oru Vilippadakale	Venu Nagavally, M. G. Soman	Jeassy	Jerry Amaldev	
O C T	21	78	Aasha	Kalaranjini, Shanavas	Augustine Prakash	A. T. Ummer	
O C T	21	79	Snehapoorvam Meera	Nedumudi Venu, Poornima Jayaram	Harikumar	M. G. Radhakrishnan	
O C T	21	80	Enikkum Oru Divasam	Mohanlal, Adoor Bhasi	Sreekumaran Thampi	Shyam	
O C T	28	81	Thadaakam	Mammootty, Ratheesh	I. V. Sasi	A. T. Ummer	
O C T	28	82	Njan Ekananu	Madhu, Dileep	P. Chandrakumar	M. G. Radhakrishnan	
O C T	28	83	Sree Ayyappanum Vavarum	Prem Nazir, Srividya	N. P. Suresh	A. T. Ummer	
O C T	29	84	Kaattile Paattu	Nedumudi Venu, Balan K. Nair	K. P. Kumaran	K. Raghavan	
O C T	29	85	Raktha Sakshi	Prem Nazir, Jose Prakash	P. Chandrakumar	A. T. Ummer	
N O V	5	86	Poo Viriyum Pulari	Shankar, Ambika	G. Premkumar	Jerry Amaldev	
N O V	5	87	Beedi Kunjamma	Srividya, M. G. Soman	K. G. Rajasekharan	A. T. Ummer	
N O V	5	88	Marmaram	Nedumudi Venu, Bharath Gopi	Bharathan	M. S. Viswanathan	
N O V	12	89	Uvvu	Jalaja, Sankar Mohan	Ben Marcose	M. B. Sreenivasan	
N O V	12	90	Kurukkante Kalyanam	Sukumaran, Madhavi	Sathyan Anthikad	Zero Babu	
N O V	12	91	Sooryan	Ajayan, Sukumaran	J. Sasikumar	Johnson	
N O V	25	92	Njan Onnu Parayatte	Jayabharathi, Nedumudi Venu	K. A. Venugopal	K. Raghavan	
N O V	25	93	Veedu	Mammootty, Zarina Wahab	Rasheed Karapuzha	G. Devarajan	
N O V	25	94	Kakka	Rohini, Kakka Ravi	P. N. Sundaram	K. V. Mahadevan	
N O V	26	95	Ithiri Neram Othiri Karyam	Sukumari, Srividya	Balachandra Menon	Johnson	
N O V	26	96	Aa Divasam	Mohanlal, Mammootty	M. Mani	Shyam	
N O V	26	97	Ente Mohangal Poovaninju	Shankar, Menaka	Bhadran	V. Dakshinamoorthy	
D E C	3	98	Keni	K. R. Vijaya, Prem Nazir	J. Sasikumar	G. Devarajan	
D E C	3	99	Sindoora Sandhyakku Mounam	Ratheesh, Lakshmi, Mohanlal	I. V. Sasi	Shyam	
D E C	24	100	Velicham Vitharunna Penkutty	Shankar, Poornima Jayaram	Durai	Shyam	
D E C	24	101	Chiriyo Chiri	Mammootty, Kaviyoor Ponnamma	Balachandra Menon	Raveendran	
D E C	24	102	Vaarikuzhi	Shubha, Sukumaran	M. T. Vasudevan Nair		
D E C	24	103	Anuraagakkodathi	Shankar, Rajkumar	Hariharan	A. T. Ummer	
D E C	25	104	Innalenkil Nale	Mammootty, Ratheesh	I. V. Sasi	Shyam	
D E C	31	105	Irattimadhuram	Prem Nazir, Krishnachandran	Sreekumaran Thampi	Shyam	
			Theeram Thedunna Thira				
			Shaari Alla Shaarada				
			Oru Sisu Jananam				

== Dubbed films ==
film	Direction	Story	Screenplay	Main Actors
Chuvanna Pushpam	Sambasivan			
Ruby My Darling	Durai			PoornimaJayaram, Mahendra
Premabhishekam	R. Krishnamoorthy			Kamal Haasan, Sreedevi, Ambika
Lady Teacher	Shankitham Srinivasa Rao			
Garudan	S. V. Rajendran			
Oru Kunju Janikkunnu				
Kadambam				
Punya Yathra				
Thee Choola				
Kuttikal Sookshikkuka	M. H. K. Moorthy			
Pallivetta	H. R. Sinha			
