= Anandakuttan =

Indian cinematographer

- Born: 1954; Vazhappilly, Changanassery, Kottayam, Kerala, India
- Died: 14 February 2016 (aged 61–62); Kochi, Kerala, India
- Occupation: Cinematographer
- Spouse: Geethamani
- Children: One son and two daughters
- Parents: Ramakrishnan Nair (father); Karthyayani Amma (mother)
- Writing career
- Notable works: His Highness Abdullah; Bharatham; Kamaladalam; Sadayam; Chronic Bachelor; Akashadoothu; Harikrishnans; Punjabi House; Aniyathipraavu

Anandakuttan (1954 – 2016) was an Indian cinematographer who worked predominantly in Malayalam cinema. He worked on over 150 films including His Highness Abdullah, Bharatham, Kamaladalam, Sadayam, Chronic Bachelor, Akashadoothu, Pappayude Swantham Appoos , Punjabi House, Hitler, Aniyathipraavu and Manivathoorile Aayiram Sivarathrikal. He died in 2016, at the age of 61.

== Biography ==
In 1954, Anandakuttan was born in vazhappilly, a small town near Changanassery, in Kottayam district of the south Indian state of Kerala, to a school teacher couple, Ramakrishnan Nair and Karthyayani Amma, as their only son among three children. He attended NSS School, Changanassery then moved to Chennai where he studied cinematography to join K. Ramachandra Babu as his assistant. His debut as an independent cinematographer was in 1977, with the movie, Manassoru Mayil, directed by P. Chandrakumar, which started a career which covered over 150 movies, some of which were commercially and critically successful such as His Highness Abdullah, Bharatham, Kamaladalam, Sadayam, Chronic Bachelor, Akashadoothu, Harikrishnans, Punjabi House and Aniyathipraavu.

Anandakuttan was married to Geethamani and the couple had a son, Sreekumar and two daughters named Neelima and Karthika. He died from cardiac arrest on 14 February 2016, aged 61, at a private hospital in Kochi. He was cremated at Ravipuram crematorium.

== Selected filmography ==
=== Malayalam films ===
- Manassoru Mayil (1977)
- Aarum Anyaralla (1978)
- Adavukal Pathinettu (1978)
- Anubhoothikalude Nimisham (1978)
- Jala Tharangam (1978)
- Anubhoothikalude Nimisham (1978)
- Kanyaka (1978)
- Manoradham (1978)
- Mudhra Mothiram (1978)
- Paavadakkari (1978)
- Reghu Vamsam (1978)
- Seemanthini (1978)
- Aavesham (1979)
- Agniparvatham (1979)
- Agni Vyooham (1979)
- Angakkuri (1979)
- Enikku Njan Swantham (1979)
- Ival Oru Naadody (1979)
- Rakthamillatha Manushyan (1979)
- Ambalavilakku (1980)
- Arangum Aniyarayum (1980)
- Idi Muzhakkam (1980)
- Swandam Enna Padam (1980)
- Theekkadal (1980)
- Arangum Aniyarayum (1980)
- Adhikaram (1980)
- Thadavara(1981)
- Sambhavam (1981)
- Aarathi (film) (1981)
- Kaattukallan (1981)
- Danda Gopuram (1981)
- Ayudham (1982)
- Rakthasakshi (1982)
- Dhrohi (1982)
- Ithu Njangalude Katha (1982)
- Kurukkante Kalyanam (1982)
- Mazhanilavu (1982)
- Mukhangal (1982)
- Oru Vilippadakale (1982)
- Saravarsham (1982)
- Aashrayam (1983)
- Engane Nee Marakkum (1983)
- Karyam Nissaram (1983)
- Kinnaram (1983)
- Mandanmmar Londanil (1983)
- Aduthaduthu (1984)
- Anthichuvappu (1984)
- Appunni (1984)
- Chakkarayumma (1984)
- Kaliyil Alpam Karyam (1984)
- Sandarbham (1984)
- Unni Vanna Divasam (1984)
- Adhyayam Onnu Muthal (1985)
- Eeran Sandhya (1985)
- Iniyum Kadha Thudarum (1985)
- Kandu Kandarinju (1985)
- Onningu Vannengil (1985)
- Orikkal Oridathu (1985)
- Oru Kudakeezhil (1985)
- Oru Nokku Kanan (1985)
- Puzhayozhukum Vazhi (1985)
- Thammil Thammil (1985)
- Upaharam (1985)
- Aayiram Kannukal (1986)
- Geetham (1986)
- Malarum Kiliyum (1986)
- Pappan Priyappetta Pappan (1986)
- Poovinu Puthiya Poonthennal (1986)
- Prathyekam Sradhikkukka (1986)
- Rareeram (1986)
- Revathikkoru Pavakkutty (1986)
- Snehamulla Simham (1986)
- Veendum (1986)
- Athinumappuram (1987)
- Manivathoorile Aayiram Sivarathrikal (1987)
- Neeyethra Dhanya (1987)
- Vilambaram (1987)
- Adharvam (1989)
- Lal Americayil (1989)
- Varusham 16 (1989)
- Arangetra Velai (1990)
- His Highness Abdullah (1990)
- Iyer the Great (1990)
- Kottayam Kunjachan (1990)
- Nagarangalil Chennu Raparkam (1990)
- No.20 Madras Mail (1990)
- Oliyampukal (1990)
- Pavakoothu (1990)
- Parampara (1990)
- Aakasha Kottayile Sultan (1991)
- Bharatham (1991)
- Ente Sooryaputhrikku (1991)
- Kamaladalam (1992)
- Pappayude Swantham Appoos (1992)
- Sadayam (1992)
- Akashadoothu (1993)
- Kabooliwala (1993)
- Kavadiyattam (1993)
- Kilipetchu Ketkavaa (1993)
- Meleparambil Anveedu (1993)
- Sthalathe Pradhana Payyans (1993)
- CID Unnikrishnan B.A., B.Ed. (1994)
- Manathe Vellitheru (1994)
- Aniyan Bava Chetan Bava (1995)
- Mangalam Veettil Manaseswari Gupta (1995)
- Mannar Mathai Speaking (1995)
- Kaliveedu (1996)
- Aniyathi Pravu (1997)
- Itha Oru Snehagatha (1997)
- Nee Varuvolam (1997)
- Poonilamazha (1997)
- Sankeerthanampole (1997)
- Harikrishnans (1998)
- Punjabi House (1998)
- Sundarakilladi (1998)
- Ustaad (1999)
- Vazhunnor (1999)
- Kannukkul Nilavu (2000)
- Life Is Beautiful (2000)
- One Man Show (film) (2001)
- Chathurangam (2002)
- Kaiyethum Doorath (2002)
- Balettan (2003)
- Chronic Bachelor (2003)
- Hariharan Pillai Happy Aanu (2003)
- Natturajavu (2004)
- Vismayathumbathu (2004)
- Oru Naal Oru Kanavu (2005)
- Pauran (2005)
- Sarkar Dada (2005)
- Nadiya Kollappetta Rathri (2007)
- Chempada (2008)
- Parthan Kanda Paralokam (2008)
- Moz & Cat (2009)
- Thirunakkara Perumal (2009)
- Vellathooval (2009)
- Annarakkannanum Thannalayathu (2010)
- Cheriya Kallanum Valiya Policum (2010)
- Thaskara Lahala (2010)
- Killadi Raman (2011)
- Living Together (2011)
- Ninnishtam Ennishtam 2 (2011)
- Ulakam Chuttum Valiban (2011)
- Doctor Innocentanu (2012)
- Hide N' Seek (2012)

=== Tamil ===
- Poovizhi Vasalile (1987)
- En Bommukutty Ammavukku (1988)
- Varusham 16 (1989)
- Arangetra Velai (1990)
- Karpoora Mullai (1991)
- Kilipetchu Ketkavaa (1993)
- Kadhalukku Mariyadhai (1997)
- Friends (2001)
- Oru Naal Oru Kanavu (2005)
- Chandhamama (2013)
- Sathura Adi 3500 (2017)

=== Telugu ===
- Killer (1992)

== See also ==
- Jayanan Vincent
- Madhu Ambat
