= Kaattu Kallan =

- Directed by: P. Chandrakumar
- Written by: T. K. Balachandran; Jagathy N. K. Achari (dialogues)
- Screenplay by: Jagathy N. K. Achari
- Produced by: T. K. Balachandran
- Starring: Prem Nazir; Sukumaran; Seema; Jagathy Sreekumar
- Cinematography: Anandakuttan
- Edited by: K. Narayanan
- Music by: A. T. Ummer
- Production company: Teakebees
- Distributed by: Teakebees
- Release date: 10 April 1981
- Country: India
- Language: Malayalam

Kaattu Kallan is a 1981 Indian Malayalam-language detective thriller film, directed by P. Chandrakumar and produced by T. K. Balachandran. The film stars Prem Nazir, Sukumaran, Seema and Jagathy Sreekumar in the lead roles. The film has a musical score by A. T. Ummer.

== Cast ==
- Prem Nazir as Balaram
- Sukumaran as Ravindran
- Seema as Vanaja & Jalaja
- Jagathy Sreekumar as Mallan
- V. T. Aravindakshamenon
- Paulson
- Prathapachandran as Eshwara Pillai
- Achankunju as Sundaram
- Ambalathara Mani
- Dhanya
- Harippad Soman
- Kanakadurga
- Laxmi
- Poojappura Ravi as Kittunni Pillai
- Ragini
- Thuravur Chandran
- Vanchiyoor Madhavan Nair
- Vembayam Thampi

== Plot ==
Balaram is an efficient police officer. He is assigned by his senior official to stop smuggling of valuable forest goods by a gang led by "Kaatukallan". Disguised as tourists coming for a leisure trip, Balram with two helpers reach the place. While searching for shelter, they find a hut where an old man stays with his young daughter. Balram stays there. During the night the daughter is dragged by a few gangsters, and Balram rescues her. However her father is shot dead in front of Balram. Balram reports the matter to police. Unfortunately police were not able to trace the corpse of the dead man and the daughter went missing. Balram continues his search for Kaatukallan, and he is informed that a youth named Ravindran is the Kaatukallan.

On the other side, Ravindran is in love with his customary bride Jajaja, who is the daughter of Eshwara Pillai, his guardian. Eshwara Pillai owns an estate in the middle of the forest. His wife is in mentally disturbed state. Ravindran visits Balaram to warn about Kaatukallan. Balaram's senior official calls and warns him as again goods were stolen from the forest, and that he will be forced to call him back. However Balaram assures that he is about to capture Kaatukallan. Balaram warns Eshwara Pillai about the mischief of his step-son Ravindran. Balaram also finds Eshwara Pillai's second daughter Vanaja under mysterious circumstances.

Vanaja is brutally beaten up by Eashwara Pilai. Balaram finds his driver in a beaten up state and then came to know that he is a spy of Kaatukallan. Vanaja is rescued by someone and dropped at Balarams house. Balaram offers shelter for her. On enquiring, Vanaja reveals how Eashwara Pillai, the then sub-ordinate of her father, who was an efficient police officer, had killed her father.

Vanaja is then taken by police as Easwara Pillai had lodged a missing case. Later Balaram come to know that it was fake police who had taken Vanaja, and follows them. He ultimately rescues Vanaja, however she is then shot. Raveendran then reveals himself as an official who was assigned to keep a watch on Balaram's activities. Eashwara Pillai is also revealed as assistant of Kaatukallan. The senior official of Balaram is revealed as Kaatukallan.

== Soundtrack ==
The music was composed by A. T. Ummer and the lyrics were written by Mankombu Gopalakrishnan.

| No. | Song | Singers | Lyrics | Length (m:ss) |
|---|---|---|---|---|
| 1 | "Kaarthika Pournami" | B. Vasantha, Chorus | Mankombu Gopalakrishnan | |
| 2 | "Sringaaram" | Vani Jairam | Mankombu Gopalakrishnan | |
| 3 | "Suruma Varachoru" | P. Jayachandran | Mankombu Gopalakrishnan | |
| 4 | "Vasantha Maalika" | K. J. Yesudas | Mankombu Gopalakrishnan | |
