= Jalatharangam (film) =

- Directed by: P. Chandrakumar
- Written by: Dr. Balakrishnan
- Screenplay by: Dr. Balakrishnan
- Produced by: R. M. Sreenivasan
- Starring: Madhu; Sheela; Adoor Bhasi; Baby Babitha
- Cinematography: Anandakuttan
- Edited by: G. Venkittaraman
- Music by: A. T. Ummer
- Release date: 20 January 1978
- Country: India
- Language: Malayalam

Jalatharangam is a 1978 Indian Malayalam film, directed by P. Chandrakumar and produced by R. M. Sreenivasan. The film stars Madhu, Sheela, Adoor Bhasi and Baby Babitha in the lead roles. The film has musical score by A. T. Ummer.

== Cast ==
- Madhu
- Sheela
- Adoor Bhasi
- Baby Babitha
- Kuthiravattam Pappu
- P. K. Abraham
- Sumithra
- Vincent

== Soundtrack ==
The music was composed by A. T. Ummer and the lyrics were written by Sathyan Anthikkad and Dr. Balakrishnan.

No.	Song	Singers	Lyrics	Length (m:ss)
1	"Aadyamaay Kandanal"	K. J. Yesudas	Sathyan Anthikkad	
2	"Kaakkayennulla Vaakkinartham"	P. Jayachandran, Shanthi, Sherin Peters	Dr. Balakrishnan	
3	"Oru Sundaraswapnam"	K. J. Yesudas	Sathyan Anthikkad	
4	"Sakhi Sakhi Chumbanam"	K. J. Yesudas	Dr. Balakrishnan	
