= Anubhoothikalude Nimisham =

1978 film

- Directed by: P. Chandrakumar
- Written by: Thoppil Bhasi
- Screenplay by: Thoppil Bhasi
- Produced by: R. S. Prabhu
- Starring: Jayan; Sharada; Adoor Bhasi; Sreelatha Namboothiri
- Cinematography: Anandakuttan
- Edited by: G. Venkittaraman
- Music by: A. T. Ummer
- Production company: Sree Rajesh Pictures
- Distributed by: Sree Rajesh Pictures
- Release date: 13 October 1978
- Country: India
- Language: Malayalam

Anubhoothikalude Nimisham (transl. The moment of sensations) is a 1978 Indian Malayalam-language film directed by P. Chandrakumar, written by Thoppil Bhasi, and produced by R. S. Prabhu. The film stars Soman, Jayan, Sharada, Adoor Bhasi and Sreelatha Namboothiri. The film has a musical score by A. T. Ummer.

== Cast ==
- K. P. Ummer
- M. G. Soman
- Jayan
- Thikkurissy Sukumaran Nair
- Adoor Bhasi
- Sankaradi
- T. P. Madhavan
- Sharada
- Seema
- Sreelatha Namboothiri
- Kaviyoor Ponnamma
- Meena (Malayalam actress)
- Pala Thankam

== Soundtrack ==
The music was composed by A. T. Ummer and the lyrics were written by Sreekumaran Thampi.

No.	Song	Singers	Lyrics	Length (m:ss)
1	"Evideyaa Mohathin"	S. Janaki	Sreekumaran Thampi	
2	"Mandahaasa Madhuradalam"	P. Susheela, P. Jayachandran	Sreekumaran Thampi	
3	"Urakku Paattin"	K. J. Yesudas	Sreekumaran Thampi	
4	"Veyilum Mazhayum"	K. J. Yesudas, B. Vasantha	Sreekumaran Thampi	
