= Adhikaram =

- Directed by: P. Chandrakumar
- Written by: R. S. Prabhu; Thoppil Bhasi (dialogues)
- Screenplay by: Thoppil Bhasi
- Produced by: R. S. Prabhu
- Starring: Seema; Sukumaran; Sharada; Raghavan
- Cinematography: Anandakuttan
- Edited by: G. Venkittaraman
- Music by: A. T. Ummer
- Production company: Sree Rajesh Films
- Distributed by: Sree Rajesh Films
- Release date: 12 February 1980
- Country: India
- Language: Malayalam

Adhikaram is a 1980 Indian Malayalam film, directed by P. Chandrakumar and produced by R. S. Prabhu. The film stars Seema, Sukumaran, Sharada and Raghavan in the lead roles. The film has musical score by A. T. Ummer.

== Cast ==
- Seema as Geetha
- Sukumaran as Rajendran
- Sharada as Vimala
- Raghavan as Raveendran
- Sathaar as Gopan
- Thikkurisi Sukumaran Nair
- Meena as Lakshmi
- Sukumari as Bhargavi Amma
- Sankaradi as Advocate Bhaskara Menon
- Jalaja as Rama
- Kunchan as Ramu
- Mala Aravindan as Appukkuttan
- Nellikode Bhaskaran as Moithukka
- T.M. Abraham

== Soundtrack ==
The music was composed by A. T. Ummer and the lyrics were written by Sathyan Anthikkad.

No.	Song	Singers	Lyrics	Length (m:ss)
1	"Aathiraappoonkurunninu"	Vani Jairam, Chorus	Sathyan Anthikkad	
2	"Thaalamthullum"	K. J. Yesudas	Sathyan Anthikkad	
3	"Vaasanthadevatha"	Vani Jairam	Sathyan Anthikkad	
