= Raghuvamsham (film) =

1978 film directed by Adoor Bhasi

- Directed by: Adoor Bhasi
- Written by: Anvar Subair
- Screenplay by: Anvar Subair
- Starring: Sharada; Adoor Bhasi; Sankaradi; Sreelatha Namboothiri; Sudheer
- Cinematography: Anandakuttan, Vipin Das
- Music by: A. T. Ummer
- Production company: Sreevilasini Arts
- Distributed by: Sreevilasini Arts
- Release date: 9 June 1978
- Country: India
- Language: Malayalam

Raghuvamsham is a 1978 Indian Malayalam film, directed by Adoor Bhasi. The film stars Sharada, Adoor Bhasi, Sankaradi and Sreelatha Namboothiri in the lead roles. The film has musical score by A. T. Ummer.

== Cast ==
- Sharada
- Adoor Bhasi
- Sankaradi
- Sreelatha Namboothiri
- Master Raghu
- Sudheer

== Soundtrack ==
The music was composed by A. T. Ummer.

No.	Song	Singers	Lyrics	Length (m:ss)
1	"Chora Thilaykkum Kaalam"	Adoor Bhasi, Sreelatha Namboothiri	Anwar Suber	
2	"Kanninte Manipol"	P. Susheela	Anwar Suber	
3	"Pandoru Kaattil"	Latha Raju	Anwar Suber	
4	"Puthiyoru Pulari"	Ambili, Chorus	Anwar Suber	
5	"Raghuvamsa Raja"	P. Jayachandran, Chorus	Anwar Suber	
6	"Veena Vaayikkum"	S. Janaki, Idava Basheer	Anwar Suber	
