= Pralayam =

- Directed by: P. Chandrakumar
- Written by: Sreemoolanagaram Vijayan
- Screenplay by: Sreemoolanagaram Vijayan
- Produced by: T. K. Balachandran
- Starring: Prem Nazir; Jayabharathi; Sukumaran; Sankaradi
- Cinematography: Indu
- Edited by: K. Narayanan
- Music by: A. T. Ummer
- Production company: Teakebees
- Distributed by: Evershine
- Release date: 3 October 1980
- Country: India
- Language: Malayalam

Pralayam is a 1980 Indian Malayalam-language film, directed by P. Chandrakumar and produced by T. K. Balachandran. The film stars Prem Nazir, Jayabharathi, Sukumaran and Sankaradi. The film's score was composed by A. T. Ummer.

== Cast ==
- Prem Nazir as Dr. Rajasekharan
- Jayabharathi as Malathi
- Sukumaran as Vishwan
- Sankaradi as Professor
- Sreelatha Namboothiri as Gayathri Devi
- Kanakadurga as Lakshmi
- M. G. Soman as Shivankutty
- Poojappura Ravi as Ravi
- Reena as Kusumam
- Vanchiyoor Madhavan Nair as Chief Editor
- Vallathol Unnikrishnan
- Bindulekha
- D. Philip
- Ambalathara Mani

== Soundtrack ==
The music was composed by A. T. Ummer with lyrics by Sathyan Anthikkad.

No.	Song	Singers	Lyrics	Length (m:ss)
1	"Aanandam"	P. Jayachandran, Ambili, Chorus	Sathyan Anthikkad	
2	"Aathmaavin Sumangal Nin"	Vani Jairam	Sathyan Anthikkad	
3	"Aathmadeepam"	P. Jayachandran	Sathyan Anthikkad	
4	"Devi Devi"	K. J. Yesudas	Sathyan Anthikkad	
