= Rakshassu =

- Directed by: Hassan
- Written by: Hassan
- Produced by: Areefa Hassan
- Starring: Baby; Sukumaran; Baby Ajitha; Bheeman Raghu
- Music by: A. T. Ummer
- Production company: Arifa Enterprises
- Distributed by: Arifa Enterprises
- Release date: 8 November 1984
- Country: India
- Language: Malayalam

Rakshassu is a 1984 Indian Malayalam horror film, directed by Hassan and produced by Areefa Hassan. The film stars Baby, Sukumaran, Baby Ajitha and Bheeman Raghu in the lead roles. The film has musical score by A. T. Ummer.

== Cast ==
- Sukumaran as Sukumaran
- Ratheesh as Ratheesh
- Bheeman Raghu as Raghu
- Baby Anju as Shalini
- Baby Ajitha
- Sankaradi as Sankaran
- Sathaar as Ravi
- Kuthiravattam Pappu as Mammad
- Seema as Seema
- Gomathi as Gomathi

== Soundtrack ==
The music was composed by A. T. Ummer and the lyrics were written by Vasudevan Panampilly, Ramachandran Ponnani and K. G. Menon.

No.	Song	Singers	Lyrics	Length (m:ss)
1	"Aamodam"	K. J. Yesudas, Ambili, Baby Geetha	Vasudevan Panampilly	
2	"Ee Mammadu Ikkakkennumennum"	K. J. Yesudas	Ramachandran Ponnani	
3	"Snehadhaarayil"	Vani Jairam	K. G. Menon	
