= Arangum Aniyarayum =

- Directed by: P. Chandrakumar
- Written by: Dr. Balakrishnan
- Screenplay by: Dr. Balakrishnan
- Produced by: R. S. Prabhu
- Starring: Sankaradi; Sukumaran; KPAC Sunny; Seema
- Cinematography: Anandakuttan
- Music by: A. T. Ummer
- Production company: Sree Rajesh Films
- Distributed by: Sree Rajesh Films
- Release date: 24 December 1980
- Country: India
- Language: Malayalam

Arangum Aniyarayum is a 1980 Indian Malayalam film, directed by P. Chandrakumar and produced by R. S. Prabhu. The film stars Sankaradi, Sukumaran, KPAC Sunny and Seema in the lead roles. The film has musical score by A. T. Ummer.

== Cast ==
- Sankaradi
- Sukumaran
- KPAC Sunny
- Seema
- T. P. Madhavan

== Soundtrack ==
The music was composed by A. T. Ummer and the lyrics were written by Sathyan Anthikkad.

No.	Song	Singers	Lyrics	Length (m:ss)
1	"Ilam Thennalo Pularithan"	Vani Jairam	Sathyan Anthikkad	
2	"Maanishaada"	Jolly Abraham	Sathyan Anthikkad	
3	"Ponmukilin"	K. J. Yesudas	Sathyan Anthikkad	
