= Seema (actress) =

Indian actress

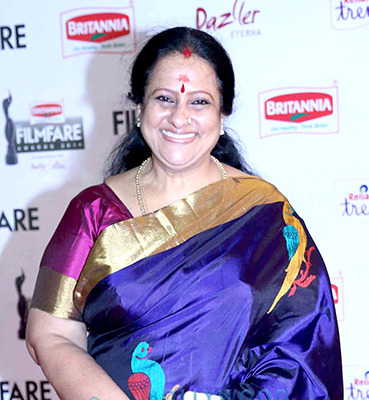
- Seema in 2015
- Born: Shanthakumari Nambiar; 22 May 1957 (age 69); Madras, Madras State, India
- Other name: Shanthi
- Occupation: Film actress
- Years active: 1973–present
- Spouse: I. V. Sasi (m. 1980; died 2017)
- Children: 2

Shanthakumari Nambiar, better known by her stage name Seema, is an Indian actress known for her work in Malayalam cinema. Actor Vijayan gave her the screen name "Seema".

== Career ==
Seema began her career in Tamil film at the age of 18 as a dancer. She debuted as an actress in director Lisa Baby's Nizhale Nee Sakshi, but this film was shelved. (It was later completed with Vidhubala as heroine.) Veteran actor Vijayan rechristened her name as Seema during the filming of Nizhale Nee Sakshi.

At the age of 21 (1978), Seema starred as the heroine in her first movie in Malayalam titled Avalude Ravukal (Her Nights), directed by I. V. Sasi.

She won the Kerala State Film Award for Best Actress in 1984 and in 1985.

After a few years of inactivity during the 1990s, Seema became active again in 1998 in Olympiyan Anthony Adam.

Vishudha Shanthi, a biography on her life, was published by Didi Damodaran, in 2011.

She received the lifetime achievement award at the 59th Idea Filmfare festival at Chennai.

== Personal life ==
She married director I. V. Sasi on 28 August 1980 and they were together until his death in 2017. The couple have a daughter, Anu and a son, Ani.

== Partial filmography ==
=== Malayalam ===
==== 1970s ====
| Year | Title | Role | Notes |
|---|---|---|---|
| 1972 | Nrithasala | Magician's assistant | |
| 1972 | Achante Bharya | | |
| 1977 | Dheerasameere Yamuna Theere | | |
| 1977 | Nizhale Nee Sakshi | | |
| 1977 | Itha Ivide Vare | In dance scene Rasaleela | |
| 1978 | Vilakkum Velichavum | | |
| 1978 | Avalude Ravukal | Raji | |
| 1978 | Urakkam Varaatha Raathrikal | Kavitha | |
| 1978 | Ee Manohara Theeram | Cabaret dancer | |
| 1978 | Soothrakkari | | |
| 1978 | Adavukal Pathinettu | | |
| 1978 | Seemanthini | | |
| 1978 | Eeta | Sreedevi | |
| 1978 | Njaan Njaan Maathram | | |
| 1978 | Anubhoothikalude Nimisham | | |
| 1978 | Padakuthira | | |
| 1978 | Manoradham | | |
| 1978 | Snehathinte Mukhangal | Radhika | |
| 1978 | Lisa | Lisa | |
| 1978 | Puthariyankam | | |
| 1978 | Aval Kanda Lokam | | |
| 1979 | Angakkuri | Sarala | |
| 1979 | Manasa Vacha Karmana | Geetha | |
| 1979 | Anupallavi | Stella | |
| 1979 | Prabhu | | |
| 1979 | Prabhaathasandhya | | |
| 1979 | Manavadharmam | | |
| 1979 | Jimmy | | |
| 1979 | Anubhavangale Nanni | | |
| 1979 | Ival Oru Naadody | | |
| 1979 | Pathivritha | | |
| 1979 | Vijayanum Veeranum | Maya | |
| 1979 | Aarattu | Lizy | |
| 1979 | Shudhikalasham | | |
| 1979 | Amrithachumbanam | | |
| 1979 | Ezhamkadalinakkare | | |
| 1979 | Sarpam | Daisy | |

==== 1980s ====
| Year | Title | Role | Notes |
|---|---|---|---|
| 1980 | Pavizha Mutthu | Malathy | |
| 1980 | Chandhrahasam | | |
| 1980 | Ammayum Makalum | Ramani | |
| 1980 | Pappu | | |
| 1980 | Moorkhan | Vilasini | |
| 1980 | Angadi | Sindhu | |
| 1980 | Sakthi | Revathi | |
| 1980 | Ivar | Lisa | |
| 1980 | Meen | | |
| 1980 | Theeram Thedunnavar | | |
| 1980 | Chaakara | Rani | |
| 1980 | Karimpana | Kamalam | |
| 1980 | Adhikaram | Geetha | |
| 1980 | Swarga Devatha | | |
| 1980 | Anthapooram | | |
| 1980 | Dwik Vijayam | Uma | |
| 1980 | Theenalangal | Raji | |
| 1980 | Deepam | Thulasi | |
| 1980 | Pradanam | | |
| 1980 | Mr. Michael | Shubha | |
| 1980 | Kaantha Valayam | Mary Hans | |
| 1980 | Manushya Mrugam | | |
| 1980 | Benz Vasu | Malathi | |
| 1980 | Arangum Aniyarayum | | |
| 1981 | Avatharam | | |
| 1981 | Enne Snehikkoo Enne Maathram | | |
| 1981 | Sankarsham | | |
| 1981 | Hamsa Geetham | | |
| 1981 | Sphodanam | Lalitha | |
| 1981 | Greeshma Jwala | Seetha | |
| 1981 | Danda Gopuram | | |
| 1981 | Aarathi | Aarathi | |
| 1981 | Kaattu Kallan | Vanaja & Jalaja | |
| 1981 | Thadavara | Rema | |
| 1981 | Kaahalam | | |
| 1981 | Thushaaram | Dr. Sindhu Menon | |
| 1981 | Karimpoocha | Leena | |
| 1981 | Sambhavam | | |
| 1981 | Archana Teacher | | |
| 1981 | Veshangal | | |
| 1981 | Ahimsa | Ani | |
| 1982 | Itha Oru Dhikkari | | |
| 1982 | Komaram | | |
| 1982 | Sindoora Sandhyakku Mounam | Seema | Cameo |
| 1982 | Maattuvin Chattangale | | |
| 1982 | Enikkum Oru Divasam | Chandrika | |
| 1982 | Chiriyo Chiri | Herself | Cameo |
| 1982 | Raktha Sakshi | | |
| 1982 | Beedi Kunjamma | | |
| 1982 | Innalenkil Nale | Vimala | |
| 1982 | Thadaakam | Sreedevi/Naseeba | |
| 1982 | Shaari Alla Saradha | | |
| 1983 | Mansoru Maha Samudram | Ranjini | |
| 1983 | Oru Mukham Pala Mukham | Sridevi | |
| 1983 | Asuran | | |
| 1983 | Kathi | | |
| 1983 | Nanayam | Sindhu | |
| 1983 | Iniyengilum | Geetha | |
| 1983 | Maniyara | Noorjahan | |
| 1983 | Oru Madapravinte Katha | Prabha | Guest appearance |
| 1983 | Aaroodam | Neeli | |
| 1983 | America America | Neena | |
| 1983 | Deepaaradhana | Vilasini | |
| 1983 | Aashrayam | | |
| 1983 | Angam | Marykkutti | |
| 1983 | Rugma | Rugma | |
| 1984 | Nishedhi | Sheeja | |
| 1984 | Rakshassu | Salomy | |
| 1984 | Kanamarayathu | Dr. Elsy George | |
| 1984 | Thirakal | Saritha | |
| 1984 | Thirakkil Alppa Samayam | Sarala | |
| 1984 | Oru Kochu Swapnam | Sulu | |
| 1984 | Vanitha Police | Sasikala | |
| 1984 | Sandarbham | Mary | |
| 1984 | Ivide Ingane | Ammini | |
| 1984 | Onnanu Nammal | Nirmala | |
| 1984 | Lakshmana Rekha | Radha | |
| 1984 | Athirathram | Thulasi | |
| 1984 | Aksharangal | Geetha | |
| 1984 | Aalkkoottathil Thaniye | Ammukutty | |
| 1984 | Inakkily | Mary | |
| 1984 | Oru Sumangaliyude Katha | Gracy | |
| 1984 | Manithali | Ramlath | |
| 1984 | Radhayude Kamukan | Radha | |
| 1984 | Karimbu | | |
| 1984 | Kodathy | Kavitha | |
| 1984 | Sandyakkenthinu Sindhooram | Ambili | |
| 1984 | Adiyozhukkukal | Devyani | |
| 1985 | Vellarikka Pattanam | Sophie | |
| 1985 | Janakeeya Kodathi | Annamma | |
| 1985 | Snehicha Kuttathinu | Yamuna | |
| 1985 | Karimpinpoovinakkare | Gouri | |
| 1985 | Gaayathridevi Ente Amma | Gayathri Devi | |
| 1985 | Idanilangal | Chinnammu | |
| 1985 | Anubandham | Sunandha | |
| 1985 | Aa Neram Alppa Dooram | Amminikutty | |
| 1985 | Ente Ammu Ninte Thulasi Avarude Chakki | Elsy | |
| 1985 | Manya Mahajanangale | Sainu | |
| 1985 | Saandham Bheekaram | Bhadra | |
| 1985 | Mukhya Manthri | Sumathi | |
| 1985 | Vasantha Sena | Shylaja Varma | |
| 1986 | Ayalvasi Oru Daridravasi | Parvathi | |
| 1986 | Ente Shabdham | | |
| 1986 | Ashtabandham | Ayisha | |
| 1986 | Surabhi Yaamangal | Sumithra | |
| 1986 | Gandhinagar 2nd Street | Nirmala teacher | |
| 1986 | Vartha | Radha Menon IAS | |
| 1986 | Koodanayum Kattu | Radhamani | |
| 1986 | Aavanazhi | Radha | |
| 1986 | Ee Kaikalil | Saritha | |
| 1986 | Akalangalil | Vasanthi | |
| 1986 | Njan Kathorthirikkum | | |
| 1986 | Chekkeranoru Chilla | Nandhini | |
| 1986 | Nilaavinte Naattil | Lakshmi | |
| 1986 | Orayiram Ormakal | | |
| 1987 | Nadodikkattu | Herself | Cameo |
| 1987 | Ithrayum Kaalam | Anna Mathukutty | |
| 1987 | Sarvakalashala | Sharadamani | |
| 1987 | Naalkavala | Dr. Radha | |
| 1987 | Adimakal Udamakal | Radha | |
| 1987 | Mizhiyorangalil | | |
| 1988 | 1921 | Radha Varma | |
| 1988 | Sangham | Molykutty | |
| 1988 | Padamudra | Alice | |
| 1988 | Mukthi | Radhamma | |
| 1988 | Vicharana | Alice | |
| 1988 | Rahasyam Parama Rahasyam | Uthara | |
| 1988 | Ayitham | Pappamma | |
| 1988 | Mattoral | Susheela | |
| 1988 | Ormayilennum | Ramani | |
| 1988 | Evidence | Alphonsa John Jacob | |
| 1989 | Aazhikkoru Muthu | | |
| 1989 | Mahayanam | Rajamma | |
| 1989 | Ashokante Asathikuttikku | | |

==== 1990s ====
| Year | Title | Role | Notes |
|---|---|---|---|
| 1999 | Olympian Anthony Adam | Principal Susamma | |

==== 2000s ====
| Year | Title | Role | Notes |
|---|---|---|---|
| 2000 | Sradha | Nandhini Balachandran | |
| 2003 | Kilichundan Mampazham | Subaidha | |
| 2004 | Udayam | Subhadra | |
| 2006 | Prajapathi | Indrani | |
| 2007 | Pranayakalam | Anna | |
| 2007 | Nagaram | Chintamani Ammalu | |
| 2008 | Aayudham | Anwar's mother | |
| 2009 | Thirunakkara Perumal | Lakshmikutty/Achamma | |
| 2009 | Vellathooval | Lizy James | |

==== 2010s ====
| Year | Title | Role | Notes |
|---|---|---|---|
| 2010 | Four Friends | Surya's mother | |
| 2011 | Abhinethri | Herself | Archive footage |
| 2011 | Uppukandam Brothers: Back in Action | Uppukandam Kunjannamma | |
| 2011 | Nadakame Ulakam | Herself | |
| 2011 | Manushyamrugam | Paramada Janu | |
| 2013 | Geethaanjali | Annamma | |
| 2014 | Tharangal | Herself | Archive footage |
| 2015 | Oru Vadakkan Selfie | Herself | Archive footage |
| 2015 | Sir C. P. | Mary | |
| 2018 | Kinar | High Court judge | |
| 2019 | Stand Up | Dr. Asha | |

==== 2020s ====
| Year | Title | Role | Notes |
|---|---|---|---|
| 2022 | Kaduva | Theruthi Chedathi | |
| 2024 | Pani | Devaki Amma | |

=== Tamil ===
| Year | Film | Role | Notes |
|---|---|---|---|
| 1973 | Vijaya | Uncredited | |
| 1974 | Petha Manam Pithu | | |
| 1975 | Yarukku Maappillai Yaro | | |
| 1975 | Avanthan Manithan | Dancer | |
| 1977 | Penn Jenmam | | |
| 1978 | Andaman Kadhali | Shanthi | |
| 1979 | Pagalil Oru Iravu | Rajee | |
| 1979 | Padhai Marinaal | | |
| 1979 | Kamasasthiram | Geetha | |
| 1979 | Ore Vaanam Ore Bhoomi | Rani | |
| 1980 | Kaali | Anitha | |
| 1980 | Ellam Un Kairasi | Rani | |
| 1981 | Kannitheevu | Malli | |
| 1981 | Enga Ooru Kannagi | | |
| 1981 | Sankarlal | Seetha/Baabi | |
| 1982 | Agni Sakshi | Herself/dancer | |
| 1983 | Kai Varisai | Roopa | |
| 1985 | Kalyana Agthigal | Valliammal | |
| 2001 | Paarthale Paravasam | Madhava's mother | |
| 2002 | Baba | Chamundeeswari's mother | |
| 2002 | Bagavathi | Anjali's mother | |
| 2003 | Anbe Sivam | Bala's aunt | |
| 2008 | Kaalai | Karuppayi Aatha | |
| 2011 | Siddhu +2 | Pavithra's grandmother | |
| 2020 | Oh My Kadavule | Judge | |
| 2021 | Maara | Paaru's grandmother | |
| 2022 | Kaathuvaakula Rendu Kaadhal | Minah Kaif | |
| 2022 | Veetla Vishesham | Unni's sister-in-law | |

=== Telugu ===
| Year | Film | Role | Notes |
|---|---|---|---|
| 1980 | Kaali | Geetha | |
| 1980 | Ketugudu | Shanti | |
| 1980 | Thathayya Premaleelalu | | |
| 1981 | Samsaram Santhanam | Menaka | |
| 1981 | Tholi Kodi Koosindi | Devudumma | |
| 1981 | Aadavaallu Meeku Joharlu | | |
| 1981 | Andagaadu | | |
| 1991 | Peddintalludu | Radha | |

=== Kannada ===
| Year | Film | Role | Notes |
|---|---|---|---|
| 1986 | Sowbhagya Lakshmi | | |
| 1986 | December 31 | | |
| 1986 | Kathanayaka | Inspector Girija | |
| 1987 | Digvijaya | | |
| 1990 | Nigooda Rahasya | | |
| 1991 | Jagadeka Veera | | |

== Television career ==
TV series

| Year | Name | Role | Channel | Language | Notes |
|---|---|---|---|---|---|
| 2000 | Jannal (Ammavukku rendula raaghu) | Avayambal | Raj TV | Tamil | |
| 2002 | Sneha | | Asianet | Malayalam | |
| 2004–2005 | Chinna Papa Periya Papa | Chinna Papa | Sun TV | Tamil | Season 2 |
| 2004 | Jalam | | Surya TV | Malayalam | |
| 2005 - 2006 | Manthrakodi | | Asianet | Malayalam | |
| 2007 | Thingalum Tharakangalum | Balasaraswathi | Amrita TV | Malayalam | |
| 2007 | Muhoortham | Radha | Asianet | Malayalam | |
| 2007–2008 | Manjal Magimai | | Kalaignar TV | Tamil | |
| 2009–2013 | Thangam | Naachiyar | Sun TV | Tamil | |
| 2010–2011 | Alaudinnte Albuthavilakku | Fathima | Asianet | Malayalam | |
| 2011–2013 | Ammakili | Dr. Indu | Asianet | Malayalam | |
| 2012 | Aaha | | Star Vijay | Tamil | |
| 2013–2017 | Vamsam | Thangamma / Ponnuthaayi | Sun TV | Tamil | |
| 2013 | Nirakoottu | Herself | Kairali TV | Malayalam | |
| 2013–2014 | Ival Yamuna | Lakshmi | Mazhavil Manorama | Malayalam | |
| 2015 | Chinna Papa Periya Papa | Chinna Papa (special appearance) | Sun TV | Tamil | Season 3 |
| 2016 | Amruthavarshini | Saraswathy a.k.a. Sarasu | Janam TV | Malayalam | |
| 2019–2020 | Kandukonden Kandukonden | Anjana Devi | Zee Tamil | Tamil | |
| 2019 | Thamarathumbi | Dr.Merlin | Surya TV | Malayalam | |
| 2021 | Sembaruthi | Sundaravalli | Zee Tamil | Tamil | Special appearance |
| 2021 | Jothi | Padmavathi | Sun TV | Tamil | |

Shows

| Year | Name | Role | Channel | Language |
|---|---|---|---|---|
| | Sangamam | Guest | Amrita TV | Malayalam |
| | Ennile Njan | Guest | ACV | Malayalam |
| 2010 | Rani Maharani | Participant | Surya TV | Malayalam |
| 2011 | Vivel Big Break | Judge | Surya TV | Malayalam |
| 2013 | Harmony | Guest | Asianet News | Malayalam |
| 2014 | Celebrity Kitchen | Guest | Puthuyugam TV | Tamil |
| 2014 | Nere Chovve | Guest | Manorama News | Malayalam |
| 2014 | Comedy Festival | Judge | Mazhavil Manorama | Malayalam |
| 2015 | JB junction | Guest | Kairali TV | Malayalam |
| 2016 | Onnum Onnum Moonu | Guest | Mazhavil Manorama | Malayalam |
| 2016 | Badai Bungalow | Guest | Asianet | Malayalam |
| 2016 | Comedy Super Nite | Guest | Flowers TV | Malayalam |
| 2016 | Comedy Utsavam | Judge | Flowers TV | Malayalam |
| 2016–2017 | Malayali Veetamma | Judge | Flowers TV | Malayalam |
| 2017 | Lal Salam | Guest | Amrita TV | Malayalam |
| 2018 | Comedy Stars season 2 | Judge | Asianet | Malayalam |
| 2018 | Straight Line | Guest | Kaumudy TV | Malayalam |
| 2018 | Urvasi Theatres | Mentor | Asianet | Malayalam |
| 2018 | Flowers Top Singer | Judge | Flowers TV | Malayalam |
| 2018 | Utsavam Super Star | Judge | Flowers TV | Malayalam |
| 2018 | Vanitha Film Awards | Awardee | | Malayalam |
| 2019 | Comedy Stars Season 2 | Judge | Asianet | Malayalam |
| 2019 | Ennum Seemayude Dhinangal | Guest | Kaumudy TV | Malayalam |
| 2020 | Comedy Super Show | Guest | Flowers TV | Malayalam |
| 2021 | Red Carpet | Mentor | Amrita TV | Malayalam |
| 2021 | Flowers Top Singer Season 2 | Judge | Flowers TV | Malayalam |
| 2021–2022 | Comedy Stars Season 3 | Judge | Asianet | Malayalam |
| 2022 | Oru Chiri Iru Chiri Bumper Chiri | Special Judge | | Malayalam |
| 2022 | Flowers Oru Kodi | Participant | Flowers TV | Malayalam |
