= Karimpana =

- Directed by: I. V. Sasi
- Written by: J. C. George
- Screenplay by: J. C. George
- Produced by: Eby Movies
- Starring: Jayan, Seema, Pramila, Ravi Menon, Bhasi, Kaviyoor Ponnamma, Kunchan, Nellicoda, Balan K. Nair, Kottarakara, Sanakaradi etc.
- Cinematography: Jayanan Vincent
- Edited by: K. Narayanan
- Music by: A. T. Ummer; Lyrics: Bichu Thirumala
- Production company: Ebby Movies
- Distributed by: Ebby Movies
- Release date: 16 October 1980
- Country: India
- Language: Malayalam

Karimpana (lit. 'Palmyra palm') is a 1980 Indian Malayalam film, directed by I. V. Sasi. The film stars Jayan, Seema, Kaviyoor Ponnamma and Adoor Bhasi in the lead roles. The film has musical score by A. T. Ummer. The film was shot in Ayira, a village near Parassala, Thiruvananthapuram district. The movie was in hit chart.

== Cast ==
- Jayan as Muthan
- Seema as Kamalam
- Kaviyoor Ponnamma Muthan's mother
- Adoor Bhasi as Mr. Kenneth (Sayippu)
- Manavalan Joseph
- Prameela as Mrs. Kenneth (Madamma)
- Sankaradi
- Cochin Haneefa
- Balan K. Nair as Chellayya
- KPAC Sunny as Sunny
- Kanakadurga
- Kottarakkara Sreedharan Nair
- Kunchan as Pushpangadan
- Kunjandi
- Kuthiravattam Pappu as Palayya
- Oduvil Unnikrishnan
- Kundara Johny
- Paravoor Bharathan
- Ravi Menon as Nesamani
- Reena as Thankamma
- Silk Smitha as Palamma

== Release ==
The film was released on 16 October 1980.

=== Box office ===
The film was commercial success.

== Soundtrack ==
The music was composed by A. T. Ummer and the lyrics were written by Bichu Thirumala.

No.	Song	Singers	Lyrics	Length (m:ss)
1	"Karimbaarakalkkullilum Kanmadam"	S. Janaki	Bichu Thirumala	
2	"Karimbanakkoottangalkkidayil"	K. J. Yesudas	Bichu Thirumala	
3	"Kombil Kilukkum Ketti"	K. J. Yesudas, Chorus	Bichu Thirumala	
4	"Pranayam Vilambum"	K. J. Yesudas	Bichu Thirumala	
