= Agni Vyooham =

1979 film

- Directed by: P. Chandrakumar
- Written by: Dr. Balakrishnan
- Screenplay by: Dr. Balakrishnan
- Produced by: R. S. Prabhu
- Starring: Shubha; Sukumaran; Kanakadurga; Sankaradi
- Cinematography: Anandakuttan
- Edited by: G. Venkittaraman
- Music by: A. T. Ummer
- Production company: Sree Rajesh Films
- Distributed by: Sree Rajesh Films
- Release date: 6 July 1979
- Country: India
- Language: Malayalam

Agni Vyooham is a 1979 Indian Malayalam film, directed by P. Chandrakumar and produced by R. S. Prabhu. The film stars Shubha, Sukumaran, Kanakadurga and Sankaradi in the lead roles. The film has musical score by A. T. Ummer.

== Cast ==
- Shubha
- Sukumaran
- Kanakadurga
- Sankaradi
- Sreelatha Namboothiri
- K. P. Ummer
- Kunchan
- Kuthiravattam Pappu

== Soundtrack ==
The music was composed by A. T. Ummer and the lyrics were written by Sathyan Anthikkad.

| No. | Song | Singers | Lyrics | Length (m:ss) |
|---|---|---|---|---|
| 1 | "Innathepulari" | Chorus, Jolly Abraham | Sathyan Anthikkad | |
| 2 | "Maanathuninnum" | P. Jayachandran | Sathyan Anthikkad | |
| 3 | "Yaaminee" | S. Janaki | Sathyan Anthikkad | |
| 4 | "Yaaminee" (Ponkarangal) | S. Janaki | Sathyan Anthikkad | |
