= Adavukal Pathinettu =

1978 film directed by Vijay Anand

- Directed by: Vijay Anand
- Written by: Manih Mohamed
- Screenplay by: Manih Mohamed
- Produced by: C. V. Hariharan; R. S. Prabhu
- Starring: Ravikumar; Jayabharathi; Seema; Jayan; Sankaradi; Prathapachandran; Kanakadurga
- Cinematography: Anandakuttan
- Music by: A. T. Ummer; Lyrics: Bichu Thirumala
- Release date: 20 March 1978
- Country: India
- Language: Malayalam
- Box office: This was a big success full movie

Adavukal Pathinettu is a 1978 Indian Malayalam film, directed by Vijay Anand and produced by C. V. Hariharan and R. S. Prabhu. The film stars Jayan, Ravikumar, Jayabharathi and Kanakadurga in the lead roles. The film has musical score by A. T. Ummer.

== Cast ==
- Ravikumar as Ravi
- Seema
- Jayan as Shekharan Kutty
- Sankaradi as Shekharan Kutty's Father
- Prathapachandran as Jaya's Father
- Kanakadurga as Bhavani amma
- Kunchan as Pappu
- Kuthiravattam Pappu as Vasu
- Veeran

== Soundtrack ==
The music was composed by A. T. Ummer and the lyrics were written by Bichu Thirumala.

No.	Song	Singers	Lyrics	Length (m:ss)
1	Anupama soundharyame	K. J. Yesudas	Bichu Thirumala	
2	"Sooryanamaskaram"	S. Janaki	Bichu Thirumala	
3	"Thaamarappoonkulakkadavinu"	S. Janaki	Bichu Thirumala	
