= Anthichuvappu =

- Directed by: Kurian Varnasala
- Produced by: Kurian Varnasala
- Starring: Mammootty; Mohan Elias; Shankar; Jalaja; Sankaradi
- Cinematography: Anandakuttan
- Music by: A. T. Ummer
- Production company: Anand Movie Makers
- Distributed by: Anand Movie Makers
- Release date: 30 August 1984
- Country: India
- Language: Malayalam

Anthichuvappu is a 1984 Indian Malayalam film, directed and produced by Kurian Varnasala. The film stars Mammootty, Mohan Elias, Shankar, Jalaja and Sankaradi in the lead roles. The film has musical score by A. T. Ummer.

== Cast ==
- Mammootty
- Mohan Elias (Sumesh)
- Shankar
- Jalaja
- Sankaradi
- Mala Aravindan

== Soundtrack ==
The music was composed by A. T. Ummer and the lyrics were written by Poovachal Khader.

| No. | Song | Singers | Lyrics | Length (m:ss) |
|---|---|---|---|---|
| 1 | "Moodalmanjumaay" | Vani Jairam | Poovachal Khader | |
| 2 | "Naale Naale" | K. J. Yesudas | Poovachal Khader | |
| 3 | "Vellichilankayaninju Vaadee" | S. Janaki, Chorus | Poovachal Khader | |
