= Manassoru Mayil =

- Directed by: P. Chandrakumar
- Written by: Dr. Balakrishnan
- Screenplay by: Dr. Balakrishnan
- Starring: Vincent; Jayan; Jayabharathi; Pattom Sadan; Sankaradi; Raghavan
- Cinematography: Anandakuttan
- Edited by: G. Venkittaraman
- Music by: A. T. Ummer
- Production company: Rekha Cine Arts
- Distributed by: Rekha Cine Arts
- Release date: 10 June 1977
- Country: India
- Language: Malayalam

Manassoru Mayil is a 1977 Indian Malayalam film, directed by P. Chandrakumar. The film stars Vincent, Jayabharathi, Pattom Sadan, Sankaradi and Raghavan, Jayan in the lead roles. The film has musical score by A. T. Ummer.

== Cast ==
- Vincent
- Raghavan
- Jayan
- Jayabharathi
- Pattom Sadan
- Sankaradi
- Praveena
- Kuthiravattam Pappu

== Soundtrack ==
The music was composed by A. T. Ummer and the lyrics were written by Dr. Balakrishnan and Sathyan Anthikkad.

No.	Song	Singers	Lyrics	Length (m:ss)
1	"Hamse Sunlo"	K. J. Yesudas	Dr. Balakrishnan	
2	"Kaathu Kaathu"	Latha Raju	Dr. Balakrishnan	
3	"Maanathoraaraattam"	K. J. Yesudas, Latha Raju	Dr. Balakrishnan	
4	"Panineerppoovinu"	K. J. Yesudas	Sathyan Anthikkad	
