= Paavaadakkaari =

- Directed by: Rochy Alex
- Written by: Purushan Alappuzha
- Screenplay by: Purushan Alappuzha
- Produced by: Purushan Alappuzha
- Starring: Vincent; Unnimary; Manjula Vijayakumar; Sreelatha Namboothiri
- Cinematography: Anandakuttan
- Edited by: N. P. Suresh
- Music by: A. T. Ummer
- Production company: Umamini Movies
- Distributed by: Umamini Movies
- Release date: 27 October 1978
- Country: India
- Language: Malayalam

Paavaadakkaari is a 1978 Indian Malayalam-language film, directed by Rochy Alex. The film stars Vincent, Unnimary, Manjula Vijayakumar, and Sreelatha Namboothiri. The film has musical score by A. T. Ummer.

== Cast ==
- Vincent
- Unnimary
- Cochin Haneefa
- Manjula Vijayakumar
- Vijayalalitha
- Poojappura Ravi
- Sreelatha Namboothiri
- Prathapachandran
- Paul Vengola
- Sadhana

== Soundtrack ==
The song was by A. T. Ummer with lyrics by Yusufali Kechery.

No.	Song	Singers	Lyrics	Length (m:ss)
1	"Kaamadevante Kali"	K. J. Yesudas	Yusufali Kechery	
2	"Maarakaakali"	Ambili, Jolly Abraham	Yusufali Kechery	
3	"Manassinullile"	K. J. Yesudas, P. Susheela	Yusufali Kechery	
4	"Tharivala Karivala"	B. Vasantha, Shailaja M. Ashok	Yusufali Kechery	
