= Enne Njan Thedunnu =

- Directed by: P. Chandrakumar
- Written by: Sylam Aluva
- Produced by: P. Ramachandran
- Starring: Madhu; Shubha; Sukumari; Kaviyoor Ponnamma
- Cinematography: Vasanth Kumar
- Edited by: G. Venkittaraman
- Music by: A. T. Ummer
- Production company: RR International
- Distributed by: RR International
- Release date: 24 January 1983
- Country: India
- Language: Malayalam

Enne Njan Thedunnu is a 1983 Indian Malayalam film, directed by P. Chandrakumar and produced by P. Ramachandran. The film stars Madhu, Shubha, Sukumari and Kaviyoor Ponnamma in the lead roles, and features a musical score by A. T. Ummer.

== Cast ==
- Madhu
- Shubha
- Sukumari
- Kaviyoor Ponnamma
- Jose Prakash
- Rugmini
- Aranmula Ponnamma
- Baby Sumathi
- Kanakadurga
- Kedamangalam Ali
- Kuthiravattam Pappu
- P. K. Abraham

== Soundtrack ==
The music was composed by A. T. Ummer and the lyrics were written by Bichu Thirumala.

No.	Song	Singers	Lyrics	Length (m:ss)
1	"Maayaa Prapanchangal"	K. J. Yesudas	Bichu Thirumala	
2	"Pularikal Paravakal"	P. Jayachandran, Vani Jairam	Bichu Thirumala	
