= Thadavara =

- Directed by: P. Chandrakumar
- Produced by: Augustine Prakash
- Starring: Jayan; K. P. Ummer; M. N. Nambiar; Seema
- Cinematography: Anandakuttan
- Edited by: G. Venkittaraman
- Music by: A. T. Ummer
- Production company: Santhosh Films
- Distributed by: Santhosh Films
- Release date: 23 January 1981
- Country: India
- Language: Malayalam

Thadavara is a 1981 Indian Malayalam film, directed by P. Chandrakumar and produced by Augustine Prakash. The film stars Jayan, K. P. Ummer, M. N. Nambiar and Seema in the lead roles. The film has musical score by A. T. Ummer.

== Cast ==
- Jayan as Rajan
- K. P. Ummer as SP Chandrasekhar
- M. N. Nambiar as Madhavan
- Seema as Rema
- Kanakadurga as Devaki
- Nanditha Bose as Nandini
- Mala Aravindan as Karnan
- Kunchan as Vaasu
- Sankaradi as Prof. Vijayanath
- Sukumari as Sarojini
- Jose Prakash as first leader of the bandit gang
- Ceylon Manohar as Vishwam
- Jyothi Lakshmi as dancer
- Jayamalini as dancer

== Release ==
The film was released on 23 January 1981.

=== Box office ===
The film was commercial success.

== Soundtrack ==
The music was composed by A. T. Ummer and the lyrics were written by Sathyan Anthikkad.

No.	Song	Singers	Lyrics	Length (m:ss)
1	"Aananda Raagamezhuthiya"	Vani Jairam	Sathyan Anthikkad	
2	"Kaattum Ee Kaadinte Kulirum"	K. J. Yesudas	Sathyan Anthikkad	
3	"Nee Maayalle"	Vani Jairam	Sathyan Anthikkad	
