= Utsavam (1975 film) =

- Poster
- Directed by: I. V. Sasi
- Written by: Sherif
- Produced by: Ramachandran
- Starring: KP Ummer; Vincent; Srividya; Sankaradi; Raghavan; Sukumaran; MG Soman
- Cinematography: Vipin Das
- Edited by: K. Narayanan
- Music by: A. T. Ummer
- Production company: Murali Movies
- Release date: 21 November 1975
- Country: India
- Language: Malayalam

Utsavam (transl. Special occasion) is a 1975 Indian Malayalam-language film, and I. V. Sasi's directorial debut. Written by Sherif, the film stars K. P. Ummer, Vincent, Srividya, Sankaradi, Raghavan, M. G. Soman and Sukumaran. It was released on 21 November 1975.

== Cast ==
- K. P. Ummer
- Vincent
- Raghavan
- Sukumaran
- M G Soman
- Janardhanan
- Sankaradi
- Bahadoor
- Kuthiravattam Pappu
- Srividya
- Rani Chandra

== Soundtrack ==
The music was composed by A. T. Ummer and the lyrics were written by Poovachal Khader.

Song	Singers
"Aadyasamaagama Lajjayil"	K. J. Yesudas, S. Janaki
"Ekaanthathayude Kadavil"	K. J. Yesudas
"Karimbukondoru"	P. Madhuri
"Swayamvarathinu"	K. J. Yesudas, S. Janaki

== Box office ==
The film was both a critical and commercial success.
