= Sambhavam =

- Directed by: P. Chandrakumar
- Written by: John Paul; Kaloor Dennis (dialogues)
- Screenplay by: Kaloor Dennis
- Produced by: Babu; Majeendran
- Starring: Madhu; Srividya; Adoor Bhasi; Jose Prakash
- Cinematography: Anandakuttan
- Edited by: G. Venkittaraman
- Music by: V. Dakshinamoorthy
- Production company: Chaithanya Films
- Distributed by: Chaithanya Films
- Release date: 10 September 1981
- Country: India
- Language: Malayalam

Sambhavam is a 1981 Indian Malayalam film, directed by P. Chandrakumar and produced by Babu and Majeendran. The film stars Madhu, Srividya, Adoor Bhasi and Jose Prakash in the lead roles. The film has musical score by V. Dakshinamoorthy.

== Cast ==
- Madhu
- Srividya
- Adoor Bhasi
- Jose Prakash
- Prameela
- Sankaradi
- Cochin Haneefa
- Sukumaran
- Ambika
- Baby Chakki
- K. P. Ummer
- Kunchan
- M. G. Soman
- Mala Aravindan
- Meena
- Ravi Menon
- Seema

== Soundtrack ==
The music was composed by V. Dakshinamoorthy and the lyrics were written by Sathyan Anthikkad.

| No. | Song | Singers | Lyrics | Length (m:ss) |
|---|---|---|---|---|
| 1 | "Pakalo Paathiravo" | K. J. Yesudas, V. Dakshinamoorthy | Sathyan Anthikkad | |
| 2 | "Sindoorathilakamaninju Vaanam" | K. J. Yesudas | Sathyan Anthikkad | |
| 3 | "Vayalinnoru Kalyanam" | K. J. Yesudas, S. Janaki, Chorus | Sathyan Anthikkad | |
| 4 | "Venmukil Peeli Choodi Thennalil" | K. J. Yesudas | Sathyan Anthikkad | |
