= Padayani (film) =

- Promotional poster
- Directed by: T. S. Mohan
- Written by: T. S. Mohan
- Dialogues by: Mosses
- Screenplay by: T. S. Mohan
- Produced by: Sukumaran
- Starring: Mammootty; Mohanlal; Master.Indrajith; Shobhana; Devan
- Cinematography: C. E. Babu
- Edited by: M. N. Appu
- Music by: A. T. Ummer
- Production company: Indraraj Creation
- Distributed by: Divya, Shiny, Prema Release
- Release date: 1 November 1986
- Country: India
- Language: Malayalam

Padayani is a 1986 Indian Malayalam-language thriller film written and directed by T. S. Mohan and produced by Sukumaran. It stars Mammootty, Mohanlal, Master.Indrajith, Shobhana and Devan. The film features music composed by A. T. Ummer. Sudhakaran, Ramesh and Rajasekharan are long-lost friends, who reunite to take revenge against the evildoer in their lives. The film was the debut of Indrajith Sukumaran, who plays the younger version of Ramesh (Mohanlal).

The film was released on 1 November 1986 on Diwali.

== Plot ==
The film begins when a widow comes with her child to a bungalow to see Vikraman Nair; the lawyer of the owner of the bungalow. Vikraman Nair had a history with the widow where he cheated on her and captured all of her properties. She meets the lawyer and requests him to give her some money to live and provide for her child, but he was heartless and didn't give her anything and tried to drive them away. The servant of that bungalow saw this and felt pity towards them. So, he gave them a job at the bungalow.

The widow's son Ramesh, the owner's son Sudhi, and another servant's son Raju from that house became close friends. One day, Vikraman Nair tries to rape the widow and she dies in the attempt. Sahadevan, the owner saw this incident and tries to call the police, but Vikraman Nair kills him. The servant saw this and fled with the children. Vikraman Nair and his men went on a lookout to kill them, but he was unable to find them. During this chaos, The three friends lost contact with each other and grew up in entirely different circumstances.

Sudhi, now Sudhakaran becomes a mechanic while Ramesh works for Vikraman Nair without the knowledge that he is the man who cheated his mother of her properties and Raju, now SI Rajashekaran becomes a police officer. They meet several times, yet they do not recognize each other. However, when they finally do; they move onto kill Vikraman Nair. During a fight, Sudhakaran stabs Vikraman Nair in the stomach with a knife, but when Sudhakaran comes down the stairs; Vikraman Nair shoots him from the back and he dies in the arms of Ramesh and Rajashekaran.

== Cast ==
- Mammootty as Sudhakaran
- Mohanlal as Ramesh
  - Indrajith Sukumaran as Young Ramesh
- Devan as SI Rajashekaran
- Shobana as Radha
- Adoor Bhasi as Shankaran
- Priya as Rajini
- Sukumaran as Sahadevan
- T. G. Ravi as Vikraman Nair
- Kundara Johnny
- Mala Aravindan as Ramu

== Soundtrack ==
The music was composed by A. T. Ummer with lyrics by Poovachal Khader.

No.	Song	Singers	Lyrics	Length
1	"Hridayam Oru Vallaki"	K. S. Chithra, Sunanda	Poovachal Khader	
2	"Hridayam Oru Vallaki"	K. J. Yesudas, P. Jayachandran	Poovachal Khader	
3	"Hridayam Oru Vallaki" (Bit)	Mohanlal	Poovachal Khader	
