= Swarga Devatha =

- Directed by: Charles Ayyampally
- Written by: Thoppil Bhasi
- Screenplay by: Thoppil Bhasi
- Starring: Sharada; K. P. Ummer; Seema; Sudheer
- Music by: M. S. Viswanathan
- Production company: RC Combines
- Distributed by: RC Combines
- Release date: 23 August 1980
- Country: India
- Language: Malayalam

Swarga Devatha is a 1980 Indian Malayalam film, directed by Charles Ayyampally. The film stars Sharada, K. P. Ummer, Seema and Sudheer in the lead roles. The film has musical score by M. S. Viswanathan.

== Cast ==
- Sharada
- K. P. Ummer
- Seema
- Sudheer
- Vincent

== Soundtrack ==
The music was composed by M. S. Viswanathan and the lyrics were written by Mankombu Gopalakrishnan.

No.	Song	Singers	Lyrics	Length (m:ss)
1	"Ambalathulasiyude Parishudhi"	K. J. Yesudas	Mankombu Gopalakrishnan	
2	"Krishnashilaathala Hrudayangale"	S. Janaki	Mankombu Gopalakrishnan	
3	"Kudumbam Oru Devaalayam"	K. J. Yesudas	Mankombu Gopalakrishnan	
