= Chaakara (film) =

- Theatrical release poster
- Directed by: P. G. Viswambharan
- Written by: Gopinath Panangad; Thoppil Bhasi (dialogues)
- Screenplay by: Thoppil Bhasi
- Starring: Jayan; Seema; Srividya; Sukumaran
- Cinematography: C. Ramachandra Menon
- Edited by: G. Murali
- Music by: G. Devarajan
- Production company: Thushara Films
- Distributed by: Thushara Films
- Release date: 18 October 1980
- Country: India
- Language: Malayalam

Chaakara is a 1980 Indian Malayalam film, directed by P. G. Viswambharan. The film stars Jayan, Seema, Srividya and Sukumaran in the lead roles. The film has musical score by G. Devarajan. The movie catapulted actor Jayan to superstardom. The movie is based on Gopinath Panangad's novel which appeared in Manorajyam. The film was shot in Chavakkad and various other parts in Thrissur district. The scenes of the beach were fully shot in Chavakkad where the shooting unit halted for more days. The movie also features the evergreen Malayalam song "Suhasiniee Subhashinee".

== Plot ==
Sethu Madhavan returns from jail to take his vengeance on Shaji who had falsely implicated him. He is repudiated by his family except his younger sister and finds shelter in an abandoned boat house on the beach -waiting for his chance to kill his enemies. He is stayed by the thought that Nimmi the woman he had loved in College -and incidentally Shaji's wife now -would be devastated if he murders Shaji. Rani is the irrepressible, cheeky daughter of a fisherwoman and working at Shaji's factory. She takes an interest in Sethu Madhavan after he comes to her help in fending off Shaji's unwelcome attention. The two grow closer and she frankly admits her love for him. He is persuaded by Nimmi and Rani to give up his vengeance after Head Constable Kuttan Pillai, the other man on his list to be murdered turns up mad. It seems fate is dealing with his enemies, especially with the arrival of a sympathetic new S.I, Devarajan in town. But Shaji is not about to give up, especially after Nimmi his own wife bears witness against him.

== Cast ==
- Jayan as Sethu Madhavan
- Seema as Rani
- T. G. Ravi as Shaji, Nimmi's husband
- Srividya as Nimmi
- Sukumaran as Devarajan, new Sub Inspector
- Jalaja as Gigi, Sethu's Sister
- K. P. A. C. Azeez as Sivaraman Nair, former Sub Inspector
- Kunjandi as Shankaran Master
- Santha Devi as Sethu's mother
- Kuthiravattam Pappu as Kuttan Pillai, Head Constable
- Mala Aravindan as Kochu Pillai
- Kunchan as Narayanan, Constable

== Soundtrack ==
The music was composed by G. Devarajan and the lyrics were written by G. K. Pallath.

No.	Song	Singers	Lyrics	Length (m:ss)
1	"Anjana Sreedhara"	P. Madhuri		
2	"Kuliru Kuliru"	K. J. Yesudas, P. Madhuri	G. K. Pallath	
3	"Suhaasini Subhaashini"	K. J. Yesudas	G. K. Pallath	

== Box office ==
The film was a major blockbuster.
