= Swapname Ninakku Nandi =

- Directed by: Kallayam Krishnadas
- Starring: Jayabharathi; Sukumaran; Bahadoor
- Music by: G. Devarajan
- Production company: Mahadeva Films
- Distributed by: Mahadeva Films
- Release date: 13 May 1983
- Country: India
- Language: Malayalam

Swapname Ninakku Nandi is a 1983 Indian Malayalam film, directed by Kallayam Krishnadas. The film stars Jayabharathi, Sukumaran and Bahadoor in the lead roles. The film has musical score by G. Devarajan.

== Cast ==
- Jayabharathi as Nabisa
- Sukumaran as Madhavankutty
- Bahadoor as Bakker
- KPAC Sunny as Johny
- Poojappura Ravi as Pachu Pilla
- Lalithasree as Kaduthi Ponnamma
- Kunchan as Mallan
- Alummoodan as Broker Gopalan
- Ravi Menon as Mammukka/Appu
- Archita as Rasiya

== Soundtrack ==
The music was composed by G. Devarajan and the lyrics were written by Kallayam Krishnadas and Chunakkara Ramankutty.

No.	Song	Singers	Lyrics	Length (m:ss)
1	"Kalichirimaaraatha"	K. J. Yesudas, P. Madhuri	Kallayam Krishnadas	
2	"Madanolsava Mela"	K. J. Yesudas	Chunakkara Ramankutty	
3	"Muthuchilankakal"	K. J. Yesudas, P. Madhuri	Chunakkara Ramankutty	
4	"Velli Nilaavil"	K. J. Yesudas	Kallayam Krishnadas	

== See the film ==
- swapname ninakku nandi
