= Theeram Thedunnavar =

- Directed by: P. Chandrakumar
- Written by: Joseph Madappally
- Screenplay by: Joseph Madappally
- Produced by: Sankar Bhatt; N. Chakrapani
- Starring: Prem Nazir; Sukumaran; Seema
- Cinematography: Vijaya Kumar
- Edited by: G. Venkittaraman
- Music by: M. S. Viswanathan
- Production company: Mekahalaya Pictures
- Distributed by: Mekahalaya Pictures
- Release date: 21 November 1980
- Country: India
- Language: Malayalam

Theeram Thedunnavar is a 1980 Indian Malayalam film, directed by P. Chandrakumar and produced by Sankar Bhatt and N. Chakrapani. The film stars Prem Nazir, Sukumaran and Seema in the lead roles. The film has musical score by M. S. Viswanathan.

== Cast ==
- Prem Nazir
- Sukumaran
- Seema

== Soundtrack ==
The music was composed by M. S. Viswanathan and the lyrics were written by Sathyan Anthikkad.

No.	Song	Singers	Lyrics	Length (m:ss)
1	"Indriyangalkkunmaadam"	Vani Jairam	Sathyan Anthikkad	
2	"Vishaada Saagara"	P. Jayachandran	Sathyan Anthikkad	
