= Mukhangal =

- Directed by: P. Chandrakumar
- Cinematography: Anandakuttan
- Edited by: G. Venkittaraman
- Music by: A. T. Ummer
- Production company: Adarsachithra
- Distributed by: Adarsachithra
- Release date: 14 October 1982
- Country: India
- Language: Malayalam

Mukhangal (lit. 'Faces') is a 1982 Indian Malayalam film, directed by P. Chandrakumar. The film has musical score by A. T. Ummer.

== Cast ==
- K. R. Vijaya as Prabha Menon
- Sankaradi as Panikker
- Shubha as Vinodhini
- Sukumaran as Doctor balachandran
- Meena as Rukmini
- Nellikode Bhaskaran as Thomas
- T. P. Madhavan as Raghavan Nair
- Jose as Ravi
- K. P. Ummer as Venu Menon
- KPAC Sunny as Roy

== Soundtrack ==
The music was composed by A. T. Ummer and the lyrics were written by Sathyan Anthikkad.

No.	Song	Singers	Lyrics	Length (m:ss)
1	"Ilam Kaattin"	K. J. Yesudas	Sathyan Anthikkad	
2	"Maanathu Thaarangal"	K. J. Yesudas	Sathyan Anthikkad	
