= Marupacha =

- Directed by: S. Babu
- Screenplay by: S. Babu
- Produced by: K. P. Kunjimon Haji
- Starring: Prem Nazir; Swapna; Sukumari
- Cinematography: P. N. Sundaram
- Edited by: N. P. Suresh
- Music by: A. T. Ummer
- Production company: Shanoj Films
- Distributed by: Shanoj Films
- Release date: 5 August 1982
- Country: India
- Language: Malayalam

Marupacha (transl. Oasis) is a 1982 Indian Malayalam-language film directed and produced by S. Babu. The film stars Prem Nazir, Swapna and Sukumari in the lead roles. The film has musical score by A. T. Ummer.

== Cast ==
- Prem Nazir as Premachandran, Prem Kumar (double role)
- Swapna as Swapna
- Jagathy Sreekumar as Kumar
- Kaviyoor Ponnamma as Ponnamma
- Sankaradi as Sankaradi Sankunni Menon
- Sukumaran as Sukumaran
- K. K. Menon
- Balan K. Nair as Mammathikka
- Janardanan as Janardanan
- Justin
- Kanakadurga as Durga
- Mala Aravindan as Professor Malavya
- Rajasekharan as Rajashekharan
- Ranipadmini as Rani
- Sadhana as Sadhana
- Saraswathi
- Sharmila as Sharmila
- Suchitra
- Vazhoor Rajan
- Sulekha (Old) as Lekha
- Mohan Vadookkara
- Vanam Savior

== Soundtrack ==
The music was composed by A. T. Ummer and the lyrics were written by Poovachal Khader.

No.	Song	Singers	Lyrics	Length (m:ss)
1	"Aathmasakhee En"	K. J. Yesudas	Poovachal Khader	
2	"Anuraagame Nin Veedhiyil"	K. J. Yesudas, S. Janaki	Poovachal Khader	
3	"Kanakachilanke Kanakachilanke"	K. J. Yesudas	Poovachal Khader	
4	"Kunkumam Vilkkunna Sandhye"	K. J. Yesudas, B. Vasantha	Poovachal Khader	
5	"Kunkumam Vilkkunna Sandhye" (Bit)	K. J. Yesudas	Poovachal Khader	
