= Etho Oru Swapnam =

- Directed by: Sreekumaran Thampi
- Written by: K. Surendran; Sreekumaran Thampi (dialogues)
- Screenplay by: Sreekumaran Thampi
- Produced by: Sreekumaran Thampi
- Starring: Jayan; Sheela; Jagathy Sreekumar; Sreelatha Namboothiri
- Cinematography: Hemachandran
- Edited by: K. Sankunni
- Music by: Salil Chowdhary
- Production company: Bhavani Rajeswari
- Distributed by: Bhavani Rajeswari
- Release date: 3 November 1978
- Country: India
- Language: Malayalam

Etho Oru Swapnam is a 1978 Indian Malayalam-language romantic drama film directed and produced by Sreekumaran Thampi. The film stars Sheela, Sukumaran, Sreelatha Namboothiri, Jagathy Sreekumar and Jayan in the lead roles. The film has musical score by Salil Chowdhary.

== Plot ==
Kausalya (Sheela) is a divorcee and she doesn't approve of her daughter Shobha's relationship with an aspiring film artist, Krishnachandran. Her friend Vijayamma also is in troubled marriage with Janardanan Nair (Jagathy Sreekumar) who is friends with Kausalyas ex-husband Divakaran Nair (Sukumaran). Both the men are alcoholics while the ladies find solace in a godman V.V. Swami (Vasudevab)(Jayan).

In their younger days, Kausalaya, Vijayamma, Divakaran and Janardanan were working together. Divakaran and Vijayamma fall in love, and Kausalya supports them. Later, Vijayamma ditches Divakaran for Janardanan who has a higher social and economic status. Kausalya tries to console a heartbroken Divakaran and they eventually falls for each other and they get married, and Shobha is born. But the marriage breaks down as Divakaran starts an affair with new colleague Susheela. Divakaran leaves his family for Susheela.

Back in the present, Shobha elopes with Krishnachandran to Madras. The couple start working on a movie which could not be completed due to creative difference with the director. A relative Thara (Nanditha Bose) an established actress, helps them. Kausalya, with a friend, reaches Madras to take her daughter back. But Shobha refuses to leave her husband.

== Cast ==
- Sheela as Kausalya
- Sukumaran as Divakaran Nair
- Jagathy Sreekumar as Janardhanan Nair
- Sreelatha Namboothiri as Susheela
- Jayan as V. V. Swami/Vasudevab
- Kanakadurga as Sathyavathi
- Mallika Sukumaran as Vijayamma
- Nanditha Bose as Thara
- Ravikumar as Krishnachandran
- Vaikkam Mani as Sathyavathi's father
- Kailas Nath as Abhayan
- Priyamvada as Shobha
- Somasekharan Nair as Film Producer

== Soundtrack ==
The music was composed by Salil Chowdhary and the lyrics were written by Sreekumaran Thampi.

No.	Song	Singers	Lyrics	Length (m:ss)
1	"Oru Mukham Maathram" (F)	Sabitha Chowdhary	Sreekumaran Thampi	
2	"Oru Mukham Maathram" (M)	K. J. Yesudas	Sreekumaran Thampi	
3	"Poo Niranjaal"	K. J. Yesudas	Sreekumaran Thampi	
4	"Poomaanam"	K. J. Yesudas	Sreekumaran Thampi	
5	"Sreepadam Vidarna"	K. J. Yesudas, Chorus	Sreekumaran Thampi	

== Box office ==
The film became a commercial success.
