= Neeyo Njaano =

- Directed by: P Chandrakumar
- Written by: S. Madhavan
- Screenplay by: S. Madhavan
- Produced by: M. Mani
- Starring: Jagathy Sreekumar; MG Soman; Sukumaran; Ambika
- Music by: Shyam
- Production company: Sunitha Productions
- Distributed by: Sunitha Productions
- Release date: 16 November 1979
- Country: India
- Language: Malayalam

Neeyo Njaano is a 1979 Indian Malayalam-language film, directed by P. Chandrakumar and produced by M. Mani. The film stars MG Soman, Sukumaran and Ambika in the lead roles. The film has musical score by Shyam.

== Cast ==
- M. G. Soman as Damu
- Sukumaran as Prasad
- Ambika as Geetha
- Jagathy Sreekumar as Kaalan Muthu
- Sankaradi as Govindaswami Gunder
- Kottarakkara Sreedharan Nair as Mayandi
- Meena as Akkaal
- Paravoor Bharathan as Sankara Pilla
- Priya (Sarapancharam actress) as Rakkamma
- Pushpa as Santha

== Soundtrack ==
The music was composed by Shyam and the lyrics were written by Sathyan Anthikkad.

No.	Song	Singers	Lyrics	Length (m:ss)
1	"Etho Oru Ponkinaavaay"	K. J. Yesudas	Sathyan Anthikkad	
2	"Kaadupoothathu"	S. Janaki, C. O. Anto	Sathyan Anthikkad	
3	"Thaamarappoonkaattupole"	P. Jayachandran, Kausalya	Sathyan Anthikkad	
4	"Thenmullappoove"	S. Janaki	Sathyan Anthikkad	
