= Beedi Kunjamma =

- Directed by: K. G. Rajasekharan
- Written by: Dr. Balakrishnan
- Screenplay by: Dr. Balakrishnan
- Produced by: K. G. Rajasekharan
- Starring: Srividya; M. G. Soman; Seema
- Cinematography: Vasanth Kumar
- Edited by: K. Narayanan
- Music by: A. T. Ummer
- Production company: United Movie Makers
- Distributed by: United Movie Makers
- Release date: 5 November 1982
- Country: India
- Language: Malayalam

Beedi Kunjamma is a 1982 Indian Malayalam film, directed and produced by K. G. Rajasekharan. The film stars Srividya, M. G. Soman and Seema in the lead roles. The film has musical score by A. T. Ummer.

== Cast ==
- Srividya as Beedikunjamma
- M. G. Soman as Madhavan
- Seema
- Balan K Nair
- K. P. Ummer as Sankaran, Madhavan's brother
- Bahadoor
- Meena as Paru
- Kaviyoor Ponnamma as Madhavan's mother

== Soundtrack ==
The music was composed by A. T. Ummer and the lyrics were written by Poovachal Khader.

No.	Song	Singers	Lyrics	Length (m:ss)
1	"Ekaanthathayude Yaamangal"	K. J. Yesudas, Ambili	Poovachal Khader	
2	"Madanante Thuneeram"	S. Janaki	Poovachal Khader	
3	"Sindooragirikal Mandaaravanikal"	K. J. Yesudas	Poovachal Khader	
4	"Thothu Thothu"	S. Janaki	Poovachal Khader	
