= Enne Snehikkoo Enne Maathram =

- Directed by: P. G. Vishwambharan
- Written by: S. L. Puram Sadanandan
- Screenplay by: S. L. Puram Sadanandan
- Produced by: O. M. John
- Starring: Srividya; Ratheesh; Sukumaran; Ambika
- Cinematography: U. Rajagopal
- Edited by: V. P. Krishnan
- Music by: K. V. Mahadevan
- Production company: St. George Movies
- Distributed by: St. George Movies
- Release date: 10 September 1981
- Country: India
- Language: Malayalam

Enne Snehikkoo Enne Maathram is a 1981 Indian Malayalam film, directed by P. G. Vishwambharan and produced by O. M. John. The film stars Srividya, Ratheesh, Sukumaran and Ambika in the lead roles. The film has musical score by K. V. Mahadevan.

== Cast ==
- M. G. Soman
- Sukumaran
- Ratheesh
- Srividya
- Ambika
- Bahadoor
- Kuthiravattam Pappu
- Seema

== Soundtrack ==
The music was composed by K. V. Mahadevan and the lyrics were written by Yusufali Kechery.

No.	Song	Singers	Lyrics	Length (m:ss)
1	"Aashaanikunjathil"	K. J. Yesudas	Yusufali Kechery	
2	"Aashaanikunjathil" (slokam)	K. J. Yesudas	Yusufali Kechery	
3	"Lillipoo Choodi Varum"	Vani Jairam	Yusufali Kechery	
4	"Prema Lahariyil Muzhuki"	K. J. Yesudas	Yusufali Kechery	
