= Aashrayam =

- Directed by: K. Ramachandran
- Written by: A. R. Mukesh; John Paul (dialogues)
- Screenplay by: John Paul
- Starring: Prem Nazir; Sukumari; Nedumudi Venu; Sankaradi
- Cinematography: Anandakuttan
- Edited by: M. N. Appu
- Music by: M. B. Sreenivasan
- Production company: Minar Movies
- Distributed by: Minar Movies
- Release date: 13 May 1983
- Country: India
- Language: Malayalam

Aashrayam is a 1983 Indian Malayalam film, directed by K. Ramachandran. The film stars Prem Nazir, Sukumari, Nedumudi Venu and Sankaradi in the lead roles. The film has musical score by M. B. Sreenivasan.

== Cast ==
- Prem Nazir
- Sukumari
- Nedumudi Venu
- Sankaradi
- Kalaranjini
- Baby Anju
- Kasim
- Seema
- Ramachandran

== Soundtrack ==
The music was composed by M. B. Sreenivasan and the lyrics were written by Poovachal Khader.

No.	Song	Singers	Lyrics	Length (m:ss)
1	"Kaayalin Kaathil" (Pathos, Bit)	K. J. Yesudas	Poovachal Khader	
2	"Nithyanaaya Manushyanu Vendi"	K. J. Yesudas, Chorus	Poovachal Khader	
3	"Pirannaalillaatha"	K. J. Yesudas, S. Janaki, Nedumudi Venu	Poovachal Khader	
4	"Thaazhikakkudavumaay"	K. J. Yesudas, S. Janaki	Poovachal Khader	
