= Shila (film) =

- Directed by: Augustine Prakash
- Written by: Augustine Prakash
- Screenplay by: Augustine Prakash
- Cinematography: Vasanth Kumar
- Edited by: A. Sukumaran
- Music by: A. T. Ummer
- Production company: Santhosh Films
- Distributed by: Santhosh Films
- Release date: 12 February 1982
- Country: India
- Language: Malayalam

Shila is a 1982 Indian Malayalam film, directed by Augustine Prakash. The film has musical score by A. T. Ummer.

== Soundtrack ==
The music was composed by A. T. Ummer and the lyrics were written by Dr. Pavithran.

No.	Song	Singers	Lyrics	Length (m:ss)
1	"Mathimukhi Nin"	K. J. Yesudas	Dr. Pavithran	
2	"Neelaambarathile Neeraalasayyayil"	K. J. Yesudas	Dr. Pavithran	
3	"Prema Raagam"	S. Janaki	Dr. Pavithran	
