= P.C. 369 =

P. C. 369
- Directed by: P. Chandrakumar
- Written by: P. M. Thaj
- Screenplay by: P. M. Thaj
- Starring: Suresh Gopi; Mukesh; Rohini; Maniyanpilla Raju
- Cinematography: N. Vijayakumar
- Edited by: K. Rajagopal
- Music by: Songs: K. P. N. Pillai; Score: S. P. Venkatesh
- Production company: Meriland Movies
- Distributed by: Meriland Movies
- Release date: 22 May 1987
- Country: India
- Language: Malayalam

P.C. 369 is a 1987 Indian Malayalam-language film, directed by P. Chandrakumar. The film stars Suresh Gopi, Mukesh, Rohini and Maniyanpilla Raju. The film has musical score by K. P. N. Pillai.

== Cast ==
- Suresh Gopi as Gopikuttan
- Mukesh as Johnny Varghese
- Rohini as Sudha
- Maniyanpilla Raju as P.C. Damodharan Pilla
- Saritha as P.C. Elsamma Mathew
- T. G. Ravi as H.C. Cheenkanni Vasu Kurup
- Vijayaraghavan as Johnny's brother
- Santha Devi as Mandara
- Oduvil Unnikrishnan as Adv. Swaminathan / Dr. Viswanathan / Prof. Kashinathan

== Soundtrack ==
The music was composed by K. P. N. Pillai with lyrics by Chowalloor Krishnankutty and Dr K. Narayanankutty.

No.	Song	Singers	Lyrics	Length (m:ss)
1	"Naadodumbol Naduve"	Krishnachandran	Chowalloor Krishnankutty	
2	"Sringaaram Kadamizhiyil"	K. J. Yesudas	Dr K. Narayanankutty	
