= Danda Gopuram =

- Directed by: P. Chandrakumar
- Written by: Dr. Balakrishnan; John Paul (dialogues)
- Screenplay by: John Paul
- Starring: Madhu; Srividya; Sukumaran; Bahadoor
- Cinematography: Anandakuttan
- Edited by: G. Venkittaraman
- Music by: Shyam
- Production company: Renjith Films
- Distributed by: Renjith Films
- Release date: 20 March 1981
- Country: India
- Language: Malayalam

Danda Gopuram is a 1981 Indian Malayalam film, directed by P. Chandrakumar. The film stars Madhu, Srividya, Sukumaran and Bahadoor in the lead roles. The film has musical score by Shyam.

== Cast ==
- Madhu
- Srividya
- Sukumaran
- Bahadoor
- Seema
- T. M. Abraham

== Soundtrack ==
The music was composed by Shyam and the lyrics were written by Sathyan Anthikkad.

No.	Song	Singers	Lyrics	Length (m:ss)
1	"Etho Gaanam Pole" (Two Versions)	K. J. Yesudas	Sathyan Anthikkad	
2	"Etho Gaanam Pole"	P. Jayachandran, Vani Jairam	Sathyan Anthikkad	
3	"Moham"	K M Shantha	Sathyan Anthikkad	
