= Akalangalil =

1986 film by J. Sasikumar

- Directed by: J. Sasikumar
- Written by: R. Syama; S. L. Puram Sadanandan (dialogues)
- Screenplay by: S. L. Puram Sadanandan
- Produced by: Sasikumar
- Starring: Nedumudi Venu; Seema
- Cinematography: Vipin Das
- Edited by: G. Venkittaraman
- Music by: Johnson
- Production company: Josey Creation
- Distributed by: Josey Creation
- Release date: 2 December 1986
- Country: India
- Language: Malayalam

Akalangalil is a 1986 Indian Malayalam film, directed by J. Sasikumar and produced by Sasikumar. The film stars Nedumudi Venu and Seema in the lead roles. The film has musical score by Johnson.

== Cast ==
- Nedumudi Venu as Sethu
- Seema as Vasanthi, Sethu's wife
- Kaviyoor Ponnamma as Sethu's mother
- Sukumari as Savithri Amma
- Ahalya
- Thilakan as Velu
- Mala Aravindan as Vasanthi's Father
- Thodupuzha Vasanthi as Nun
- Jose Prakash as Police
- V. D. Rajappan

== Soundtrack ==
The music was composed by Johnson and the lyrics were written by K. Jayakumar.

No.	Song	Singers	Lyrics	Length (m:ss)
1	"Illilam Poo" (Female Bit)	Lathika	K. Jayakumar	
2	"Illilam Poo" (Male Bit)	Unni Menon	K. Jayakumar	
3	"Illilam Poo"	Chorus, J. M. Raju, Lathika	K. Jayakumar	
4	"Raagodayam"	Unni Menon, Lathika	K. Jayakumar	
