= Agniparvatham =

1979 film

- Directed by: P. Chandrakumar
- Written by: K. P. Kottarakkara
- Screenplay by: K. P. Kottarakkara
- Produced by: K. P. Kottarakkara
- Starring: Madhu; Srividya; Ambika; Jose Prakash
- Cinematography: Anandakuttan
- Edited by: G. Venkittaraman
- Music by: Pukazhenthi
- Production company: Jayadevi Movies
- Distributed by: Jayadevi Movies
- Release date: 5 October 1979
- Country: India
- Language: Malayalam

Agniparvatham (lit. 'Volcano') is a 1979 Indian Malayalam film, directed by P. Chandrakumar and produced by K. P. Kottarakkara. The film stars Madhu, Srividya, Ambika and Jose Prakash in the lead roles. The film has musical score by Pukazhenthi.

It was the remake of the Tamil hit Thanga Pathakkam.

== Cast ==
- Madhu as S.P Viswanathan
- Srividya as Lakshmi
- Ambika as Vimala
- Jose Prakash as Kaduva Ramu
- Sathaar as Ragu
- Kundara Johnny
- Master Ravikumar
- Sankaradi
- Manjeri Chandran
- T. P. Madhavan as Police Officer
- Mala Aravindan as P C Mathai
- Sam
- Bhim Raj
- Paramu
- Suresh
- Gopan Kalharam
- Oduvil Unnikrishnan
- Aryad Gopalakrishnan
- K.P Kumar

== Soundtrack ==
The music was composed by Pukazhenthi.

No.	Song	Singers	Lyrics	Length (m:ss)
1	"Achante Swapnam"	P. Susheela, P. Jayachandran	Sreekumaran Thampi	
2	"Achante Swapnam" (Pathos) (Bit)	P. Jayachandran	Sreekumaran Thampi	
3	"Enippadikal"	P. Jayachandran	Sreekumaran Thampi	
4	"Kudumbam Snehathin"	P. Jayachandran, Vani Jairam	Sreekumaran Thampi	
5	"Makarakkoythu"	Vani Jairam	Sreekumaran Thampi	
6	"Yaa Devi" (Slokam)	P. Jayachandran	Sreekumaran Thampi	
