= Onnaam Muhurtham =

- Directed by: Rahim Chelavoor
- Screenplay by: Rahim Chelavoor
- Starring: Mukesh; Sukumaran; Archana; Siddique
- Cinematography: Ramesh
- Edited by: L. Bhoominathan
- Music by: Kannur Rajan
- Production company: Keemattathil Films
- Distributed by: Keemattathil Films
- Release date: 1991
- Country: India
- Language: Malayalam

Onnaam Muhurtham is a 1991 Indian Malayalam-language film, directed by Rahim Chelavoor. The film stars Mukesh, Sukumaran, Archana and Siddique in the lead roles. The film has musical score by Kannur Rajan.

== Cast ==
- Mukesh as Vishwanathan
- Sukumaran as Ananthan Nambiar
- Archana as Radhika Vishwanath
- Siddique as Kumaran
- KPAC Sunny as Shekhara Kurup
- K. R. Savithri
- Mamukkoya as Sulaiman
- Vijayaraghavan as William
- Ajith Chandran
- Sandhya rani

== Soundtrack ==
The music was composed by Kannur Rajan with lyrics by Vijayan.

No.	Song	Singers	Lyrics	Length (m:ss)
1	"Karalil Mohangal"	K. S. Chithra, M. G. Sreekumar	Vijayan	
