= Kandukondain Kandukondain (TV series) =

Indian Tamil TV Series

- Genre: Soap opera
- Directed by: Ramkumar Doss
- Starring: Vishnu Unnikrishnan; Krishnapriya K Nair
- Opening theme: "Kandukonden Kandukonden"
- Country of origin: India
- Original language: Tamil
- No. of episodes: 265

Production
- Camera setup: Multi-camera
- Running time: 22 minutes
- Production company: In House Production

Original release
- Network: Zee Tamil
- Release: 1 April 2019 – 31 July 2020

Kandukondain Kandukondain or Kandukonden Kandukonden (transl. I Have Seen It, I Have Seen It) is an Indian Tamil-language soap opera which aired on Zee Tamil. It stars Vishnu Unnikrishnan and Krishnapriya. It aired from 1 April 2019 to August 2020. The series premiered on 1 April 2019 and, due to the COVID-19 pandemic, it ended on 20 August 2020 with 265 episodes.

== Plot ==
Vikram, who lost their parents in childhood and grown under his grandmother Anjana Devi. Vikram loves a girl, Preethi, and decides to marry her. But Vikram's aunt Chandrika and her daughter Kriba makes plan to separate them. Thus by a twist of fate, finally Vikram married Preethi.

== Cast ==
=== Main ===
- Vishnu Unnikrishnan as Vikram
- Krishnapriya K Nair as Preethi / Thenmozhi

=== Supporting ===
- Seema as Anjana Devi: Vikram's grandmother
- Anu Sulash as Kriba: Vikram's cousin and Chandrika's daughter
- Amritha Varnan as Chandrika: Anjana's daughter and Vikram's aunt
- Premalatha as Vikram's parental aunt
- Madhu Mohan as Vikram's parental uncle
- Anbazhagan as Ramki: Chandrika's husband
- Dhindukal Saravanan as Veerabhagu: House worker
- Madhumitha Illayaraja as Sreeja: Chandrika's relation
