= Enikku Njaan Swantham =

- Directed by: P. Chandrakumar
- Written by: Dr. Balakrishnan
- Screenplay by: Dr. Balakrishnan
- Produced by: M. Mani
- Starring: Madhu; Jagathy Sreekumar; Jose; Shubha
- Cinematography: Anandakuttan
- Edited by: G. Venkittaraman
- Music by: Shyam; Lyrics: Bichu Thirumala; Sathyan Anthikkad
- Production company: Sunitha Productions
- Distributed by: Sunitha Productions
- Release date: 27 April 1979
- Country: India
- Language: Malayalam

Enikku Njaan Swantham is a 1979 Indian Malayalam language film, directed by P. Chandrakumar and produced by M. Mani. The film stars Madhu, Jagathy Sreekumar, Jose and Shubha. The film has musical score by Shyam.

== Cast ==
- Madhu as Vasu
- Jagathy Sreekumar as Kili Balan
- Jose as Mohan
- Shubha as Meenu
- Ambika as Geetha
- Nanditha Bose as Leela
- KPAC Sunny as Naanu
- T. P. Madhavan as Madhavankutty
- Aranmula Ponnamma as Madhavakutty's mother
- Meena as Vasanthy/Mohan's mother
- Paravoor Bharathan as Mohan's father

== Soundtrack ==
The music was composed by Shyam and the lyrics were written by Bichu Thirumala and Sathyan Anthikkad.

No.	Song	Singers	Lyrics	Length (m:ss)
1	"Medamaasakkaalam"	S. Janaki	Bichu Thirumala	
2	"Melam Unmaadathaalam"	S. Janaki, P. Jayachandran	Bichu Thirumala	
3	"Minnaaminnippoomizhi"	Jolly Abraham	Bichu Thirumala	
4	"Parakotti Thaalam Thatti"	S. P. Balasubrahmanyam, Chorus	Bichu Thirumala	
5	"Poovirinjallo"	K. J. Yesudas, P. Susheela	Sathyan Anthikkad	
