= Aayudham (1982 film) =

- Directed by: P. Chandrakumar
- Written by: Kaloor Dennis
- Screenplay by: Kaloor Dennis
- Produced by: R. S. Prabhu
- Starring: Madhu; K. R. Vijaya; Sukumaran; MG Soman; KP Ummer
- Cinematography: Anandakuttan
- Edited by: G. Venkittaraman
- Music by: A. T. Ummer
- Production company: Rajesh Films
- Distributed by: Rajesh Films
- Release date: 10 June 1982
- Country: India
- Language: Malayalam

Aayudham is a 1982 Indian Malayalam-language film, directed by P. Chandrakumar and produced by R. S. Prabhu. The film stars Madhu, K. R. Vijaya, Sukumaran and Thikkurissy Sukumaran Nair. The film has musical score by A. T. Ummer. The film is remake of 1976 Bollywood movie Adalat.

== Cast ==
- Madhu as Sathyapalan
- K. R. Vijaya as Susheela
- M. G. Soman as Inspector Williams
- Sukumaran as Rajan
- K. P. Ummer as Vishwanathan
- Sukumari as Saraswathi
- Thikkurissy Sukumaran Nair as Barrister Rajashekharan Thambi
- Sankaradi as Moosa
- Menaka as Usha
- Balan K. Nair as Prathapan
- C. I. Paul as Thambi
- Janardanan as Suresh
- Kunchan as Kunchan, Phalgunan (double role)
- Paravoor Bharathan as Menon
- Poornima Jayaram as Sandhya
- Sabitha Anand as Girl at oppana
- Vallathol Unnikrishnan as Antony
- Kundara Johnny as Johny
- Pournami as Sainaba
- P. R. Menon as Judge
- Prameela as Sainabha
- Thalavadi Devan
- Karunakaran
- Karatte Mani

== Soundtrack ==
The music was composed by A. T. Ummer and the lyrics were written by Sathyan Anthikkad.

No.	Song	Singers	Lyrics	Length (m:ss)
1	"Antharangathin Ajnaatha"	K. J. Yesudas	Sathyan Anthikkad	
2	"Enikku Chuttum"	K. J. Yesudas	Sathyan Anthikkad	
3	"Mailaanchi"	S. Janaki, P. Jayachandran, Kalyani Menon	Sathyan Anthikkad	
4	"Raaga Madhurima"	K. J. Yesudas, L. R. Eeswari	Sathyan Anthikkad	
