= Itha Oru Dhikkari =

- Directed by: N. P. Suresh
- Written by: Purushan Alappuzha; Alappuzha Karthikeyan (dialogues)
- Screenplay by: Purushan Alappuzha
- Produced by: Purushan Alappuzha
- Starring: Prem Nazir; Jayabharathi; Srividya; Sukumaran
- Cinematography: P. N. Sundaram
- Edited by: N. P. Suresh
- Music by: A. T. Ummer
- Production company: Sreedevi Movies
- Distributed by: Sreedevi Movies
- Release date: 27 November 1981
- Country: India
- Language: Malayalam

Itha Oru Dhikkari is a 1981 Indian Malayalam film, directed by N. P. Suresh and produced by Purushan Alappuzha. The film stars Prem Nazir, Jayabharathi, Srividya and Sukumaran in the lead roles. The film has musical score by A. T. Ummer.

== Cast ==
- Prem Nazir as Ravi
- Jayabharathi as Ramani
- Srividya as Ammini
- Sukumaran as Suku
- Balan K. Nair as Panikkar
- M. G. Soman as Raju
- Mala Aravindan as Kumar
- Janardhanan as Kurup
- Sathyakala
- Kaduvakulam Antony as Keshavan
- Subhashini
- Manochithra
- Cochin Haneefa as Shekaran
- Meena
- Devi
- Sujithra

== Soundtrack ==
The music was composed by A. T. Ummer and the lyrics were written by Poovachal Khader.

No.	Song	Singers	Lyrics	Length (m:ss)
1	"Ariyaathe Ariyaathe Anuraaga"	K. J. Yesudas	Poovachal Khader	
2	"Ente Janmam Neeyeduthu"	K. J. Yesudas, S. Janaki	Poovachal Khader	
3	"Meghangal"	K. J. Yesudas, S. Janaki	Poovachal Khader	
