= Ithum Oru Jeevitham =

- Directed by: Veliyam Chandran
- Written by: Veliyam Chandran
- Screenplay by: Veliyam Chandran
- Produced by: Udaya
- Starring: Jagathy Sreekumar; Thikkurissy Sukumaran Nair; Kalpana; Sukumaran
- Cinematography: Hemachandran
- Edited by: K. P. Hariharaputhran
- Music by: R. Somasekharan
- Production company: Abhilash Bhanu Films
- Distributed by: Abhilash Bhanu Films
- Release date: 2 July 1982
- Country: India
- Language: Malayalam

Ithum Oru Jeevitham is a 1982 Indian Malayalam-language film, directed by Veliyam Chandran and produced by Udaya. The film stars Jagathy Sreekumar, Thikkurissy Sukumaran Nair, Kalpana and Sukumaran. The film has musical score by R. Somasekharan.

== Cast ==
- Jagathy Sreekumar as Sankaran
- Thikkurissy Sukumaran Nair as Padmanaban Thampi
- Kalpana as Sheela
- Sukumaran as Sreekumar
- Kanakadurga as Rathi
- Kottarakkara Sreedharan Nair as Old man
- Sharmila as Seetha
- Sai Kumar as Kuttan
- Aranmula Ponnamma as Madhavi
- Aryad Gopalakrishnan as Raghavan Nair
- Poojappura Ravi as Seetha's father
- Chavara V. P. Nair as Dasammavan
- Aroor Sathyan as Menon
- PN Gopalakrishna Pilla as Krishnan
- Kedamangalam Ali as Rathi's uncle

== Soundtrack ==
The music was composed by R. Somasekharan and the lyrics were written by Vellanad Narayanan and Konniyoor Bhas.

No.	Song	Singers	Lyrics	Length (m:ss)
1	"Maaranicheppile"	S. Janaki, Somasekharan	Vellanad Narayanan	
2	"Prakrithee Prabhaamayi"	K. J. Yesudas	Konniyoor Bhas	
