= Aarohanam (1980 film) =

- Directed by: A Sheriff
- Written by: Nedumudi Venu (dialogues)
- Screenplay by: Nedumudi Venu
- Starring: Nedumudi Venu; Prathap Pothen; Jalaja; Kanakadurga
- Music by: Shyam
- Production company: Sunilraj Pictures
- Distributed by: Sunilraj Pictures
- Release date: 15 February 1980
- Country: India
- Language: Malayalam

Aarohanam is a 1980 Indian Malayalam film, directed by A. Sheriff. The film stars Nedumudi Venu, Prathap Pothen, Jalaja and Kanakadurga in the lead roles. The film has a musical score by Shyam.

== Cast ==
- Nedumudi Venu as Gopi
- Prathap Pothen as Raju
- Jalaja as Photographer's wife
- Kanakadurga as Devi, Raju's stepmother
- Surekha as Geetha
- Vidhubala as Mini
- KPAC Azeez as Raju's father
- Bobby Kottarakkara as Ponnan
- Jagathy as Photographer

== Soundtrack ==
The music was composed by Shyam and the lyrics were written by Poovachal Khader.

No.	Song	Singers	Lyrics	Length (m:ss)
1	"Madhuram Madhuram Malarin"	K. J. Yesudas, Vani Jairam, Chorus	Poovachal Khader	
2	"Ore Raagageetham"	S. Janaki	Poovachal Khader	
