= Ponnum Poovum =

- Directed by: A. Vincent
- Written by: Thalassery Raghavan
- Screenplay by: Thalassery Raghavan
- Produced by: S. Pavamani
- Starring: Mammootty; Nedumudi Venu; Sukumaran; Menaka; BahadurPrathapachandran
- Cinematography: P. Bhaskara Rao
- Edited by: Bhaskar
- Music by: K. Raghavan
- Production company: Prathap Chithra
- Distributed by: Prathap Chithra
- Release date: 26 February 1982
- Country: India
- Language: Malayalam

Ponnum Poovum is a 1982 Indian Malayalam-language film, directed by A. Vincent and produced by S. Pavamani. The film stars Mammootty, Nedumudi Venu, Menaka and Prathapachandran. The film's score was composed by K. Raghavan.

== Cast ==
- Mammootty as Salim
- Nedumudi Venu as Dasan
- Menaka as Subhadra
- Sukumaran as Balan Nair
- Prathapachandran as Pillai
- Sukumari as Lakshmi
- Bahadoor as Khader
- Sabitha Anand as Woman in Taxi
- T. R. Omana as Radha
- Master Suresh as Unnimon

== Soundtrack ==
The music was composed by K. Raghavan with lyrics by P. Bhaskaran.

No.	Song	Singers	Lyrics	Length (m:ss)
1	"Akatheriyum"	K. J. Yesudas	P. Bhaskaran	
2	"Kalluvettaamkuzhi"	K. J. Yesudas	P. Bhaskaran	
3	"Neelamalappoonkuyile"	P. Jayachandran	P. Bhaskaran	
4	"Thiruvullakkaavilinnu"	Vani Jairam	P. Bhaskaran	
