= Kanakadurga =

Indian actress

- Born: India
- Occupation: Actress
- Years active: 1970 – present
- Spouse: Hemachandran (Deceased- 2001)
- Children: Manasa

Kanakadurga is an Indian actress best known for her work in Malayalam cinema. She hails from Vijayawada, Andhra Pradesh. She debuted in the Malayalam movie Nellu as Kurumatti. She has acted in a few Tamil, Kannada and Telugu movies as well. She married Malayalam cinematographer Hemachandran and her daughter Manasa has acted in few Malayalam movieslike Big B, Kaakki, Jubilee, Calcutta News, The Snake And Ladder etc., Telugu movies like Nandanavanam 120 km, Shankar, Tamil serial Uthiripookkal and later married Tamil actor Vikranth. She is now acting in tele films and soap operas.

== Filmography ==
=== Malayalam ===
1. Jayan - The man behind the legend (2010) - documentary as Herself
2. Soothradharan (2001) as Bharathi Akka
3. Vetta (1984)
4. Ente Gramam (1984)
5. Enne Njaan Thedunnu (1983) as Sharada
6. Ithum Oru Jeevitham (1982) as Rathi
7. Kaalam (1982)
8. Marupacha (1982) as Durga
9. Koritharicha Naal (1982)
10. Kodumudikal (1981)
11. Thadavara (1981) as Devaki
12. Ariyapedatha Rahasyam (1981) as Sarojam
13. Kaattukallan (1981)
14. Randu Mukhangal (1981)
15. Kaattupothu (1981)
16. Agnikshethram (1980) as Shantha
17. Aarohanam (1980) as Devi
18. Idimuzhakkam (1980) as Gayathridevi/Marykutti
19. Makaravilakku (1980)
20. Pralayam (1980) as Lekshmi
21. Shakthi (1980)
22. Karimpana (1980)
23. Ival Ee Vazhi Ithuvare (1980)
24. Abhimanyu (1980)
25. Agnivyooham (1979)
26. Sikharangal (1979)
27. Simhaasanam (1979) as Madhavi
28. Irumbazhikal (1979) as Sainaba
29. Tharangam (1979) as Janu
30. Avano Atho Avalo (1979)
31. Vijayam Nammude Senani (1979)
32. Valeduthavan Valal(1979)
33. Rakthamillatha Manushyan(1979)
34. Kathirmandapam (1979)
35. Nizhalukal Roopangal (1979)
36. Uthradaraathri (1978)
37. Ithaa Oru Manushyan (1978)
38. Lisa (1978) as Former Hostel Warden
39. Snehathinte Mukhangal (1978) as Savithri
40. Etho Oru Swapnam (1978) as Sathyavathi
41. Hemantharaathri (1978)
42. Adavukal Pathinettu (1978)
43. Vadakakku Oru Hridayam (1978) as Malini
44. Ashtamangalyam (1977)
45. Nurayum Pathayum (1977)
46. Karnaparvam (1977)
47. Thuruppugulan (1977)
48. Mohiniyaattam (1976) as Anasooya
49. Themmadi Velappan (1976) as Madhavi
50. Pick Pocket (1976) as Madhavikutty/Gourimatha
51. Theekkanal (1976)
52. Thomasleeha (1975)
53. Raasaleela (1975)
54. Nellu (1974) as Kurumatti
55. Mazhakkaaru (1973) as Malathi
56. Nirthashala (1972) as Sindhu

=== Tamil ===
1. Oli Vilakku (1968) as paired with Cho
2. Enga Oor Raja (1968) as Vijaya
3. Sorgam (1970) as Lakshmi
4. Savaale Samali (1971) as Jayalalitha's friend
5. Arunodhayam (1971)
6. Veettuku oru Pillai (1971)
7. Apoorva Raagangal (1975)
8. Pon Megalai (2005)

=== Telugu ===
1. Private Master (1967)
2. Manchi Kutumbam (1968) as Kamala
3. Andala Ramudu (1973) as Classical dancer
4. Abhimanavanthulu (1973)
5. Nindu Kutumbam (1973)
6. Sri Kanakadurga Mahima (1973)

=== Kannada ===
1. Maya Manushya (1976)
