= Koritharicha Naal =

- Directed by: J. Sasikumar
- Written by: Kaval Surendran
- Screenplay by: Kaval Surendran
- Produced by: T. K. K. Nambiar
- Starring: M. G. Soman, Adoor Bhasi; Balan K. Nair; Jalaja; Kanakadurga
- Cinematography: Rajkumar
- Edited by: K. Sankunni
- Music by: M. K. Arjunan
- Production company: Devi Jayasree Productions
- Distributed by: Devi Jayasree Productions
- Release date: 2 June 1982
- Country: India
- Language: Malayalam

Koritharicha Naal is a 1982 Indian Malayalam film, directed by J. Sasikumar and produced by T. K. K. Nambiar. The film stars M. G. Soman, Adoor Bhasi, Balan K. Nair, Jalaja and Kanakadurga in the lead roles. The film has musical score by M. K. Arjunan.

== Cast ==
- M. G. Soman
- Adoor Bhasi
- Balan K. Nair
- Jalaja
- Jyothi
- Kanakadurga
- Shanavas

== Soundtrack ==
The music was composed by M. K. Arjunan and the lyrics were written by Chirayinkeezhu Ramakrishnan Nair.

No.	Song	Singers	Lyrics	Length (m:ss)
1	"Ezhilampaalathanalil"	K. J. Yesudas	Chirayinkeezhu Ramakrishnan Nair	
2	"Pachilakaadinnarikil"	Vani Jairam	Chirayinkeezhu Ramakrishnan Nair	
3	"Shraavanapournami Panthalittu"	K. J. Yesudas	Chirayinkeezhu Ramakrishnan Nair	
4	"Sukham Oru Sukham"	P. Madhuri, Chorus	Chirayinkeezhu Ramakrishnan Nair	
