= Dhrohi =

- Directed by: P. Chandrakumar
- Written by: T. K. Balachandran; Dr. Pavithran (dialogues)
- Produced by: Suvarna Muhammed
- Starring: Prem Nazir; Jagathy Sreekumar; Jose Prakash; Menaka
- Music by: A. T. Ummer
- Production company: Teakebees
- Distributed by: Teakebees
- Release date: 22 January 1982
- Country: India
- Language: Malayalam

Dhrohi is a 1982 Indian Malayalam film, directed by P. Chandrakumar and produced by T. K. Balachandran. The film stars Prem Nazir, Jagathy Sreekumar, Jose Prakash and Menaka in the lead roles. The film has musical score by A. T. Ummer.

== Cast ==
- Prem Nazir
- Jagathy Sreekumar
- Jose Prakash
- Menaka
- M. G. Soman
- Poojappura Ravi
- Ravikumar
- Swapna

== Soundtrack ==
The music was composed by A. T. Ummer and the lyrics were written by Mankombu Gopalakrishnan.

No.	Song	Singers	Lyrics	Length (m:ss)
1	"Karayil Pidichitta"	P. Jayachandran	Mankombu Gopalakrishnan	
2	"Muthaaya Muthaanu"	B. Vasantha, Laila Razak	Mankombu Gopalakrishnan	
3	"Syamanthakam Kilungunna"	K. J. Yesudas, B. Vasantha	Mankombu Gopalakrishnan	
