= Sharam (film) =

- Directed by: Joshiy
- Written by: Pappanamkodu Lakshmanan
- Produced by: Thiruppathi Chettiyar
- Starring: Sukumaran; Srividya; Jagathy Sreekumar; Jose Prakash
- Music by: K. J. Joy
- Production company: Evershine
- Distributed by: Evershine
- Release date: 14 May 1982
- Country: India
- Language: Malayalam

Sharam is a 1982 Indian Malayalam film, directed by Joshiy and produced by Thiruppathi Chettiyar. The film stars Sukumaran, Srividya, Jagathy Sreekumar and Jose Prakash in the lead roles. The film has musical score by K. J. Joy. It did not make expected success at the box-office . The film is a remake of the 1981 Tamil film Vidiyum Varai Kaathiru.

== Cast ==
- Sukumaran as Sunil
- Srividya
- Jagathy Sreekumar
- Jose Prakash
- Sathaar
- Ambika
- K. P. Ummer
- Janardhanan
- Ranipadmini

== Soundtrack ==
The music was composed by K. J. Joy and the lyrics were written by Devadas.

No.	Song	Singers	Lyrics	Length (m:ss)
1	"Manjima Vidarum Pularkaalam"	K. J. Yesudas	Devadas	
2	"Panineer Poochoodi"	K. J. Yesudas, P. Susheela	Devadas	
3	"Venmegham Kudachoodum"	P. Susheela	Devadas	
