= Vaarikuzhi =

- Directed by: M. T. Vasudevan Nair
- Written by: M. T. Vasudevan Nair
- Screenplay by: M. T. Vasudevan Nair
- Produced by: K. C. Joy
- Starring: Shubha; Sukumaran; Nedumudi Venu; Sankaradi
- Cinematography: Ramachandra Babu
- Edited by: G. Venkittaraman
- Music by: M. B. Sreenivasan
- Production company: Priyadarsini Movies
- Distributed by: Priyadarsini Movies
- Release date: 24 December 1982
- Country: India
- Language: Malayalam

Vaarikuzhi is a 1982 Indian Malayalam film, written and directed by M. T. Vasudevan Nair and produced by K. C. Joy. The film stars Shubha, Sukumaran, Nedumudi Venu and Sankaradi in the lead roles.

== Cast ==
- Shubha
- Sukumaran
- Nedumudi Venu
- Sankaradi
- Indira
- Kuttyedathi Vilasini
- Sudha
- Suvarna
