= Raktha Sakshi =

- Directed by: P. Chandrakumar
- Written by: T. K. Balachandran
- Screenplay by: T. K. Balachandran
- Produced by: T. K. Balachandran
- Starring: Prem Nazir; Jose Prakash; Menaka; M. G. Soman
- Cinematography: Anandakuttan
- Edited by: K. Narayanan
- Music by: A. T. Ummer
- Production company: Teakebees
- Distributed by: Teakebees
- Release date: 29 October 1982
- Country: India
- Language: Malayalam

Raktha Sakshi (lit. 'Martyr') is a 1982 Indian Malayalam film, directed by P. Chandrakumar and produced by T. K. Balachandran. The film stars Prem Nazir, Jose Prakash, Menaka and M. G. Soman in the lead roles and features a musical score by A. T. Ummer.

== Cast ==
- Prem Nazir
- Jose Prakash
- Menaka
- M. G. Soman
- Paravoor Bharathan
- Ravikumar
- Seema

== Soundtrack ==
The music was composed by A. T. Ummer and the lyrics were written by Mankombu Gopalakrishnan.

No.	Song	Singers	Lyrics	Length (m:ss)
1	"Paanchajanyathin"	K. J. Yesudas	Mankombu Gopalakrishnan	
2	"Paanchajanyathin" (F)	Jency	Mankombu Gopalakrishnan	
3	"Shaarike"	K. J. Yesudas	Mankombu Gopalakrishnan	
