= Mazhu =

- Directed by: P. K. Krishnan
- Written by: Khan; Jayanarayanan (dialogues)
- Screenplay by: Jayanarayanan
- Produced by: Joye Palliyan; K. P. Mohammed
- Starring: Sathaar; Sukumaran; Balan K. Nair; Lalithasree
- Cinematography: P. Lakshmanan
- Edited by: Gouthaman
- Music by: Shyam
- Production company: Manjulali Films
- Distributed by: Manjulali Films
- Release date: 22 January 1982
- Country: India
- Language: Malayalam

Mazhu is a 1982 Indian Malayalam film directed by P. K. Krishnan and produced by Joye Palliyan and K. P. Mohammed. The film stars Sathaar, Sukumaran, Balan K. Nair and Lalithasree in lead roles, with music composed by Shyam.

== Cast ==
- Sathaar
- Sukumaran
- Balan K. Nair
- Lalithasree
- Nellikode Bhaskaran
- Rathidevi

== Soundtrack ==
The music was composed by Shyam and the lyrics were written by Poovachal Khader.

No.	Song	Singers	Lyrics	Length (m:ss)
1	"Sundaree Soumya Sundaree"	Unni Menon	Poovachal Khader	
