= Thadaakam =

- തടാകം
- Directed by: I. V. Sasi
- Written by: T. Damodaran
- Produced by: Areefa Hassan
- Starring: Mammooty; Ratheesh; Seema; Sumalatha; Captain Raju; Balan K. Nair; Bheeman Raghu; Kuthiravattam Pappu; Sabitha Anand; Surekha
- Cinematography: Ashok Kumar
- Edited by: K. Narayanan
- Music by: A. T. Ummer
- Release date: 28 October 1982
- Language: Malayalam

Thadaakam (transl. Lake) is a 1982 Indian Malayalam-language psychological drama film directed by I. V. Sasi, starring Ratheesh, Seema, Bheeman Raghu, Mammotty & Balan K Nair.

== Cast ==
- Ratheesh as Rajendran
- Seema as Sreedevi/Naseeba
- Sumalatha as Sabara
- Captain Raju as Gabbar Khan
- Balan K. Nair as Gopakumar
- Bheeman Raghu as Rahim
- Kuthiravattam Pappu as Balan
- Sabitha Anand
- Surekha as Sulekha
- Mammotty as Jaffar Khan

== Plot ==
The film focuses on Sreedevi (Seema), who experiences strange and challenging behavior while remembering a past life. This causes great stress for her husband, Rajendran (Ratheesh), as the recently married couple travel to Kashmir for their honeymoon.

Jaffar Khan (Mammootty) is the love interest from SreeDevi's previous life in Kashmir as Nazeema, a Muslim woman. Both Nazeema and Jaffar were killed by Gabbar Khan (Captain Raju) in a jealous rage.

Nazeema's spirit stirs up memories of her past life within SreeDevi which Rajendran's uncle (Balan K Nair) helps to bring out which helps SreeDevi. Sumalatha and Bheeman Raghu play characters who knew Nazeema.

In the finale, Gabbar attacks Rajendran and SreeDevi thinking that SreeDevi is Nazeema. This time Gabbar is killed.
