= Kazhumaram =

- Directed by: A. B. Raj
- Starring: Sukumaran; Sumalatha; Sukumari; Balan K. Nair; Rajkumar Sethupathy
- Music by: Shankar–Ganesh
- Production company: SVS Films
- Distributed by: SVS Films
- Release date: 12 March 1982
- Country: India
- Language: Malayalam

Kazhumaram is a 1982 Indian Malayalam film, directed by A. B. Raj and starring Sukumaran, Sumalatha, Sukumari and Balan K. Nair. The film has a musical score by Shankar–Ganesh.

== Cast ==
- Sukumaran
- Sumalatha
- Sukumari
- Balan K. Nair
- Kottarakkara Sreedharan Nair
- Uma Bharani
- Rajkumar Sethupathy

== Soundtrack ==
The music was composed by Shankar–Ganesh and the lyrics were written by Bichu Thirumala.

No.	Song	Singers	Lyrics	Length (m:ss)
1	"Kallavaattinoppam"	S. P. Balasubrahmanyam	Bichu Thirumala	
2	"Muthuppanthal Mullappanthal"	P. Jayachandran, Vani Jairam	Bichu Thirumala	
3	"Oru Thamburu Naadasarovaram"	Unni Menon	Bichu Thirumala	
4	"Slokam"		Traditional	
5	"Thiramaalakal Moodiya"	K. J. Yesudas	Bichu Thirumala	
