= P. Chandrakumar =

Indian film director, cinematographer, actor, and film distributor

- Born: 4 July 1954 (age 72); Kollengode, Palakkad district, Kerala, India
- Occupations: Film director; cinematographer; actor; distributor
- Years active: 1971 – present
- Spouse: Jayanthi
- Children: 2
- Relatives: P. Sukumar (brother)

P. Chandrakumar is an Indian film director, cinematographer, and film distributor who has worked in Malayalam cinema. He is known for introducing the soft-porn/erotic trend in Malayalam cinema during the late 1980s. His film Adipapam (1988) is considered the first successful Malayalam film with softcore nudity.

== Early life ==
Chandrakumar hails from Kollengode, Palakkad district in Kerala, India. He has a younger brother P. Sukumar. He was schooled at Rajas School in Kollengode. P. Kunhiraman Nair taught at the school during the time. His father, Kumaran Nair worked in the Police department and also as a visha vaidyan (venom doctor). After his father received transfer to Parambikulam, Chandrakumar took the job as a visha vaidyan when he was yet to turn 14 years. He also learned and used to perform Kathakali in front of tourists in the Kollengode Palace. Vasu Menon, the founder of Vasu Films company and Vasu Studio once received treatment from him for snake bite. Vasu identified Chandrakaumar as the Kathakali performer he saw at the Kollengode Palace and invited him to film industry. It was a turning point in his life.

== Career ==
At the age of 14, he began his film career as an assistant director in P. Bhaskaran-directed Ummachu (1971). It was on the sets of Ummachu he met Madhu, who would later produce six films and act in 47 films directed by Chandrakumar. After Ummachu, he worked under 13 directors. He debuted as a director at the age of 19 with the 1977 black and white film Manassoru Mayil which was a moderate box office success. His second film Jala Tharangam (1978) starring Madhu also performed moderately. His third film was the first production of Madhu's Uma Studio Anubhoothikalude Nimisham, which was also a major commercial success.P Chandrakumar directed around 100 malayalam films. His malayalam film Uyararum Njaan Nadaake was a career break in actor Mohanlal's cinema career. P Chandrakumar presented many actors and film directors to Malayalam fil industry. Sathyan Anthikkad, Kamal etc. are among them. In 1980s, he founded a company for distributing English films. In 1988, he directed Adipapam, an erotic film based on the bible, which became one of the highest-grossing Malayalam films of all time. It is regarded as the first superhit softporn film in Malayalam cinema. The success of the film kick started a trend of softporn films in Malayalam cinema for a while.

== Personal life ==
He is married to Dr. Jayanthi and the couple has two children—Kiran Kumar and Karishma. His younger brother P. Sukumar is a popular cinematographer, actor and film director in Malayalam.

== Filmography ==
.Thudarum (2025)

- putham pudu Neram Thamil (2026)
- Velothsavam Malayalam (2025)(Farmers Story)
- Gethika (its a Getha Story) 2024
- Chemmarathi Pookkum Kaalam (2023)
- Mini (1996)
- Agnishalabhangal (1993)
- Thiraseelakku Pinnil (1993)
- Aalasyam (1990)
- Rosa I Love You (1990)
- Urvashi (1990)
- Kalpana House (1989)
- Kanana Sundari (1989)
- Rathibhaavam (1989)
- Adipapam (1988)
- Mini (1995)
- Thadavarayile Rajakkanmaar (1989)
- Jungle Boy (1987)
- Kurukkan Rajavayi (1987)
- P.C. 369 (1987)
- Yaagagni (1987)
- Ithra Maathram (1986)
- Karutha Kuthira (1986)
- Njan Piranna Nattil (1985)
- Uyarum Njan Nadaake (1985)
- Theere Pratheekshikkathe (1984)
- Aana (1983)
- Enne Njan Thedunnu (1983)
- Rathilayam (1983)
- Ayudham (1982)
- Rakthasakshi (1982)
- Njan Ekanaanu (1982)
- Dhrohi (1982)
- Aarathi (1981)
- Kaattukallan (1981)
- Avathaaram (1981)
- Danda Gopuram (1981)
- Sambhavam (1981)
- Thadavara(1981)
- Adhikaram (1980)
- Air Hostess
- Arangum Aniyarayum (1980)
- Deepam (1980)
- Edanthottam (1980)
- Ithile Vannavar (1980)
- Kaaval Maadam(1980)
- Pralayam (1980)
- Theeram Thedunnavar (1980)
- Agni Parvatham (1979)
- Agni Vyooham (1979)
- Enikku Njan Swantham (1979)
- Neeyo Njaano (1979)
- Prabhatha Sandhya (1979)
- Shudhikalasham (1979)
- Anubhoothikalude Nimisham (1978)
- Asthamayam (1978)
- Jala Tharangam (1978)
- Manassoru Mayil (1977)
