= Sukumaran =

Indian film actor and producer (1948-1997)

- Born: Edappal Ponnamkuzhi Veettil Parameswaran Sukumaran Nair; 10 June 1948; Edappal, Malabar District, Madras State, India (Present-day Malappuram, Kerala, India)
- Died: 16 June 1997 (aged 49); Thiruvananthapuram, Kerala, India
- Occupations: Actor; film producer
- Years active: 1973–1997
- Spouse: Mallika Sukumaran (m. 1978)
- Children: Indrajith Sukumaran; Prithviraj Sukumaran
- Relatives: Poornima Indrajith (daughter-in-law); Prarthana Indrajith (granddaughter)

Edappal Ponnamkuzhi Veettil Parameswaran Sukumaran Nair (10 June 1948 – 16 June 1997), known mononymously as Sukumaran, was an Indian actor and producer of Malayalam films. Sukumaran became a popular film star in Malayalam cinema during the 1970s. He was considered one of the superstar trios of Malayalam cinema during the late 1970s and early 1980s along with Soman and Jayan.

Later, he became known for his character roles and antagonistic roles during the 1980s and 1990s, notably the villain in CID Unnikrishnan B.A., B.Ed. (1994) and Onnaam Muhurtham (1991), playing character roles in films like Souhrudam (1990). In 1978, he won the Kerala State Film Award for Best Actor for his performance in M. T. Vasudevan Nair's Bandhanam. As a producer, he produced such films as Irakal and Padayani.

On 16 June 1997, Sukumaran suffered a massive heart attack and died. He was 49 at the time.

== Early life ==
Sukumaran was born at Edappal, Ponnani taluk, Malabar District, Madras Presidency, British India (present-day Malappuram District, Kerala) in the year 1948 as the eldest son of Parameshwaran Nair and Subhadra P. Nair. He had two younger brothers and a sister. (Dr. Sethumadhavan, Dr. Sivadasan, and Sathee Devi).

Sukumaran was educated at St. Thomas Higher Secondary School, Pala and at Church Mission Society Higher Secondary School, Thrissur. After completing his master's degree in English literature from University College, Thiruvananthapuram, with a gold medal, he began a job as a college lecturer for three years at Government College, Kasaragod, and at Scott Christian College, Nagercoil.

== Career ==
During his tenure teaching English at Scott Christian College in Nagercoil, Tamil Nadu, Sukumaran got an offer to act in the Malayalam movie Nirmalyam, directed by M. T. Vasudevan Nair. He accepted the role of a defiant youngster in the film. The film went on to win accolades from all over and won a couple of National Film Awards as well. Despite being noted as a talented actor, Sukumaran did not receive any offers for some time after. He was thinking of returning to the teaching profession, when he was offered a role in Shankupushpam. With that film, Sukumaran carved a niche for himself in the Malayalam film industry. He worked with director P. Venu in the film Thacholi Thankappan (1983). Thakilu Kottampuram, directed by Balukiriyath, was one of his best films in the 1980s. He then went on to act in substantial roles in films such as Avalude Ravukal, Angadi, Bandhanam, Etho Oru Swapnam, Manasa Vacha Karmana, Ahimsha, Spodanam, Shalini Ente Koottukari, Angakkuri, Kolilakkam, Theekkadal, Sandarbam, Witness and Kottayam Kunjachanan. By the year 1985, he had stopped playing hero roles. His role as a defiant police officer in Oru CBI Diary Kurippu and its sequel Jagratha, directed by K. Madhu, was noted for its characterisation and earned cult status when the third sequel in the series, Sethurama Iyer CBI, had Sai Kumar portraying the son of the police officer, with the mannerisms and voice tone of Sukumaran. Sukumaran won the Kerala State Film Award for Best Actor in 1978 for his role in Bandhanam. Sukumaran had his own production company, called Indraraj Creations. One of his productions Irakal, directed by K. G. George, was selected for the Indian Panorama in the International Film Festival of India (IFFI). The Association of Malayalam Movie Artists (AMMA) had sidelined and unofficially banned Sukumaran from films for around three years during the mid-90s, for some of the comments he made on the industry and its politics. His last film was Shibiram, directed by T. S. Suresh Babu.

== Personal life ==
Sukumaran married actress Mallika Sukumaran on 17 October 1978. They have two sons who both work in Malayalam film industry; Indrajith Sukumaran and Prithviraj Sukumaran. Actress Poornima Mohan and journalist Supriya Menon are his daughters-in-law. His grand daughter Prarthana Indrajith is a playback singer. Sukumaran died due to a massive heart attack on 16 June 1997.

== Awards ==
- Kerala State Film Award for Best Actor – 1978 – Bandhanam (directed by M. T. Vasudevan Nair)

== Filmography ==
=== 1970s ===
Year	Title	Role	Notes
1973	Nirmalyam	Appu	
1974	Neelakannukal	Sreedharan	
1975	Ayodhya		Guest role
1975	Chumaduthangi	Reghu	
1975	Omanakkunju		
1975	Priye Ninakku Vendi		
1975	Ullasa Yaathra		
1975	Utsavam	Nanu	
1975	Utharayanam	Premkumar	
1976	Lakshmi Vijayam		
1977	Amme Anupame		
1977	Angeekaaram	Ravi	
1977	Innale Innu		
1977	Santha Oru Devatha		
1977	Sankhupushpam	Venu	
1977	Sooryakanthi		
1978	Aazhi Alayaazhi		
1978	Bandhanam	Unnikrishnan Menon	
1978	Bhrashtu		
1978	Ee Manohara Theeram	Chandrashekhara Menon	
1978	Etho Oru Swapnam	Divakaran Nair	
1978	Gaandharvam		
1978	Ini Aval Urangatte		
1978	Jayikkaanaay Janichavan		
1978	Kalpavriksham	Ajayan/Vasu	
1978	Kaathirunna Nimisham	Raghu	
1978	Madaalasa	Pattalam Vasu	
1978	Mannu	Rajan	
1978	Pichipoo		
1978	Rajan Paranja Kadha		
1978	Randilonnu	Mohan	
1978	Randu Penkuttikal		
1978	Sathrathil Oru Raathri		
1978	Soothrakkaari		
1979	Agnivyooham		
1979	Angakkuri	Balakrishnan	
1979	Ente Neelakaasham	Shekharan	
1979	Ente Sneham Ninakku Mathram		
1979	Hridayathil Nee Mathram		
1979	Ival Oru Naadody		
1979	Kannukal	Damu	
1979	Kazhukan	Gopi	
1979	Lilly Pookkal		
1979	Lovely		
1979	Maalika Paniyunnavar	Kuttappan	
1979	Manasa Vacha Karmana	Sukumaran	
1979	Mochanam	Soman	
1979	Neeyo Njaano	Prasad	
1979	Radha Enna Pennkutti		
1979	Sandhyaragam		
1979	Thuramukham		
1979	Vadaka Veedu		

=== 1980s ===
Year	Title	Role	Notes
1980	Aagamanam	George Thomas	
1980	Adhikaram	Rajendran	
1980	Aambal Poovu		
1980	Angaadi	Gopi	
1980	Aniyatha Valakkal	Ganesh	
1980	Chaakara	Devarajan	
1980	Dooram Arike	James	
1980	Idi Muzhakkam	Krishnan Thirumeni	
1980	Ishtamanu Pakshe		
1980	Ithile Vannavar	Venu	
1980	Ivar	Raghavan Nair	
1980	Kalika	Joseph	
1980	Kaavalmaadam	Rajasekharan Thampi	
1980	Kochu Kochu Thettukal		
1980	Pralayam	Vishwan	
1980	Shalini Ente Koottukari	Jayadevan	
1980	Sishirathil Oru Vasantham		
1980	Soorya Daaham		
1980	Thaliritta Kinakkal		
1980	Theekkadal	Varghese	
1980	Theeram Thedunnavar		
1980	Vedikkettu	Jayan	
1980	Vilkkanundu Swapnangal	Rajagopal	
1981	Aarathi	Simon Peter	
1981	Agni Saram		
1981	Agni Yudham		
1981	Ahimsa	Devan	
1981	Aambal Poovu		
1981	Anthiveyilile Ponnu		
1981	Arangum Aniyarayum	Raghu	
1981	Arayannam	Madhu	
1981	Asthamikkatha Pakalukal	Suku	
1981	Avatharam	Shivan	
1981	Dantha Gopuram		
1981	Dhruvasangamam		
1981	Ellam Ninakku Vendi	Mohan	
1981	Enne Snehikkoo Enne Maathram		
1981	Greeshma Jwala	Hari	
1981	Itha Oru Dhikkari	Suku	
1981	Ithihasam		
1981	Kathayariyathe	Vishnu	
1981	Kaattu Kallan	Ravindran	
1981	Kolilakkam		
1981	Nizhalyudham		
1981	Orikkal Koodi	Soman	
1981	Sankharsham	Jagadeesh	
1981	Sneham Oru Pravaaham		
1981	Sphodanam	Gopi	
1981	Thakilu Kottampuram	Unnikrsihna Kurup	
1981	Swarnappakshikal		
1981	Valarthumrugangal	Daredevil Bhaskaran	
1982	Aa Divasam	Dr. Rajan	
1982	Anguram	Babu	
1982	Ayudham	Rajan	
1982	Dheera	Vinod	
1982	Aarambham	Rajan	
1982	Ethiraalikal	Gopi	
1982	Ivan Oru Simham	Gopi	
1982	Kazhumaram	Ajayan	
1982	Kurukkante Kalyanam	Sivasubrahmania Hariramachandran	
1982	Marupacha	Sukumaran	
1982	Mazhu		
1982	Ponnum Poovum	Balan Nair	
1982	Post Mortem	Peter	
1982	Sara Varsham	Dr. K. Sumesh	
1982	Sharam	Sunil	
1982	Sooryan	Gopinadhan Nair	
1982	Thuranna Jail	Gopi	
1982	Varikuzhi		
1983	Belt Mathai	Belt Mathai/Mathews	
1983	Ee Yugam	Soman	
1983	Kattaruvi	Munni	
1983	Kinnaram	Sethu	
1983	Mandanmmar Londanil	Raghu	
1983	Pourusham	Sreeni	
1983	Sandhya Vandanam	Ramachandran	
1983	Thacholi Thankappan	Thankappan	
1983	Vaashi		
1983	Swapname Ninakku Nandi	Madhavankutty	
1984	Attahaasam		
1984	Aayiram Abhilashangal		
1984	Inakkilly	The Priest	
1984	Ivide Ingane	Raju	
1984	Karimbu		
1984	Kudumbam Oru Swargam Bharya Oru Devatha	Aravindan	
1984	Mainakam	Sathyan	
1984	NH 47	Rahim	
1984	Nethavu		
1984	Nishedhi	Raju	
1984	Onnum Mindatha Bharya	Sethu Pilla	
1984	Oru Sumangaliyude Katha	Rajendran	
1984	Rakshassu	Sukumaran	
1984	Sandarbham		
1984	Shabadham	Sathyaseelan	
1984	Unaroo	Janardanan	
1985	Aarodum Parayaruthu		
1985	Choodatha Pookal	Mohan	
1985	Irakal	Sibi Mathews	
1985	Janakeeya Kodathi	Chennikal Velayudhan	
1985	Mounanombaram		
1986	Aavanazhi	Jayachandran	
1986	Annoru Ravil	Indrajith	
1986	Nyayavidhi	Makforce Saayippu	
1986	Padayani	Sahadevan	
1987	Achuvettante Veedu	Prabhakaran	
1987	Sarvakalashala	Jayadevan/Kurup Sir	
1988	August 1	K G Ramachandran	
1988	Ayitham	Abukka	
1988	Moonnam Mura	D. I. G. Menon	
1988	Oozham		
1988	Oru CBI Diary Kurippu	Dy SP Devadas	
1988	Oru Muthassi Katha	Rajasekharan	
1988	Ulsavapittennu	Ravi	
1988	Unnikrishnante Adyathe Christmas	Paul Kallookkaran	
1988	Witness	Thomas Mathew	
1989	Aayiram Chirakulla Moham		
1989	Aazhikkoru Muthu	Prabhakaran	
1989	Adhipan	SP Nambiar	
1989	Adikkurippu	Chief Minister	
1989	Bhadrachitta	Sivan	
1989	Carnival	Chandrappan aka Bhai	
1989	Dasharatham	Dr. Hameed	
1989	Jaathakam	Somasekharan Nair	
1989	Jagratha	Devadas	
1989	Kaalal Pada	Income Tax Officer Raveendranath	
1989	Mudra	Sugunan	
1989	New Year	Circle Inspector Stephen	
1989	Utharam	Mathew Joseph	
1989	Eenam Thettatha Kattaru	Jayan	

=== 1990s ===
Year	Title	Role	Notes
1990	Crime Branch	SI Susheelan	
1990	Kottayam Kunjachan	Uppukandam Korah	
1990	Marupuram	Issac Thomas	
1990	Mukham	Minnal Madhavan	
1990	Vasavadatha		
1990	Naale Ennundengil	Jayan	
1990	Oliyampukal	M. Thomas	
1990	Randam Varavu	Hariprasad	
1990	Vyhooham	Mohan	
1991	Arangu	Adv. Robert Pereira Vallokkaran	
1991	Chakravarthy	Shivaraman	
1991	Koodikazhca	Thommichan	
1991	Onnaam Muhurtham	Ananthan Nambiar	
1991	Souhrudam	John Samuel	
1991	Mahassar	MG Panikkar	
1992	Police Diary		
1993	Janam	Lukose	
1993	Sainyam	Air Vice Marshal Nambiar	
1993	Uppukandam Brothers	Uppukandam Kora	
1994	Cabinet	Madhava Menon	
1994	CID Unnikrishnan B.A., B.Ed.	Ananthapadmanabhan	
1994	Pingami	George Mathew	
1994	Rajadhani	C.K. Radhakrishnan	
1994	Bharanakoodam	Commissioner Venugopal	
1995	Boxer	John Samuel	
1995	Indian Military Intelligence	Major B. Rajaraja Varma	
1995	Prayikkara Pappan	DFO James Antony	
1995	Kidilol Kidilam	Superintendent of Police	
1997	Shibiram		
1997	Vamsam		

== Producer ==
- Irakal (1985)
- Padayani (1986)

== Trivia ==
Director KR Mohanan shot Ashwathama (1979) with Sukumaran in a lead role for six days. Thereafter, the actor's schedule clashed with that of another movie, and Madampu Kunjukuttan replaced him in Ashwathama.
