= A. T. Ummer =

Indian Malayalam music composer

- Born: Anjukandy Thalakkal Ummer; 10 March 1933; Anjukandy, Kannur, Malabar district, Madras presidency, British India
- Died: 18 October 2001 (aged 68); Chennai, Tamil Nadu, India
- Occupation: music director
- Years active: 1967-2001

Anjukandy Thalakkal Ummer (10 March 1933 – 18 October 2001) was a Malayalam music composer from Kerala, India. He is known for composing many soft melodies for 174 Malayalam movies.

Born in Anjukandy in Kannur district on 10 March 1933, as the son of A. T. Moideen Kunhi and Sainaba, Ummer made his debut in the 1967 film Thalirukkal. In 1969 he composed songs for the film Almaram, directed by A. Vincent. Two years later, Ummer composed music for Vincent's musical film Abhijathyam.

In the 1970s, Ummer teamed up with lyricist Bichu Thirumala, producing numerous evergreen songs. He also made tunes for lyrics by P. Bhaskaran and O. N. V. Kurup, along with others. Most of his songs were sung by K. J. Yesudas and S. Janaki.

In 1976, he won the Kerala State Film Award for the best music director for the I. V. Sasi directed film Aalinganam. The melancholic song "Thushaara bindhukkale" from the same movie earned S. Janaki the Kerala State Film Award for the best female singer. His song 'Neela jalashayathil' from the movie Angekaram earned the State Award for Yesudas in 1977. He composed many popular songs including 'Oru mayil peeliyay njan','Marivill panthalitta', 'Devi nin chiriyil', 'Vakappoo maram choodum', 'Chemapakappoonkavanathile', 'Ninnepunaran neettiya kaikalil', 'Vrishchika rathri than', 'Pottikkaranjukondomane', 'Thushara bindukkale', 'Unni aarariro' and 'Oru nimisham tharoo'. However, many of his hits songs were composed by copying tunes of songs from other languages, mostly Hindi.

He died at his home in Chennai aged 68 on 18 October 2001, after suffering from Parkinson's disease and lung cancer.

== Filmography ==
=== The list of a few films that feature songs composed by Ummer in Malayalam ===
- 1977 Aadhya Paadam
- 1978 Avalude Raavukal
- 1979 Aavesham
- 1980 Karimpana
- 1981 Ahimsa
- 1982 Ina
- 1982 Thadakam
- 1982 Raktha Sakshi
- 1982 Mukhangal
- 1983 Oru Mukham Pala Mukham
- 1984 Paavam Krooran
- 1984 Oru Kochukatha Aarum Parayatha Katha
- 1984 Lakshmana Rekha
- 1985 Naayakan
- 1985 Janakeeya Kodathi
- 1986 T.P. Balagopalan M.A.
- 1988 Simon Peter Ninakku Vendi
- 1991 Ganamela

== Music department (3 credits) ==
- 1978 Soothrakkari (musical director)
- 1982 Mukhangal (musical director)
- 1983 Eettillam (musical director)
