= List of Malayalam films of 1977 =

The following is a list of Malayalam films released in the year 1977.

Opening		Sl. No.	Film	Cast	Director	Music director	Notes
J A N	14	1	Sreemad Bhagavad Geetha	Srividya, Ponnamma	P. Bhaskaran	V. Dakshinamoorthy	
J A N	21	2	Dheerasameere Yamuna Theere	Madhu, Vidhubala	Madhu	Shyam	
J A N	28	3	Thuruppu Gulan	Prem Nazir, Jayabharathi	J. Sasikumar	V. Dakshinamoorthy	
F E B	3	4	Siva Thandavum	Kamal Haasan, Sreedevi	N. Sankaran Nair	M. B. Sreenivasan	
F E B	4	5	Allahu Akbar	Jayabharathi, K.P. Ummer, Jeassy	Moithu Padiyath	M. S. Baburaj	
F E B	10	6	Panchamrutham	Prem Nazir, Jayabharathi	J. Sasikumar	G. Devarajan	
F E B	10	7	Aparadhi	Prem Nazir, Madhu	P. N. Sundaram	Salil Chowdhary	
F E B	10	8	Aasheervaadam	Kamal Haasan, Sheela	I. V. Sasi	M. K. Arjunan	
F E B	13	9	Dweepu	Jose, Shobha	Ramu Kariyat	M. S. Baburaj	
F E B	25	10	Pallavi	Vincent, Jayabharathi	B. K. Pottekkad	Kannur Rajan	
F E B	25	11	Akale Aakaasham	Madhu, Vidhubala	I. V. Sasi	G. Devarajan	
M A R	2	12	Sankhupushpam	Sukumaran, Vidhubala, M. G. Soman	Baby	M. K. Arjunan	
M A R	3	13	Madhura Swapanam	Kamal Haasan, Unnimary	M. Krishnan Nair	M. K. Arjunan	
M A R	11	14	Rajaparambara	Vincent, Jayabharathi	Dr. Balakrishnan	A. T. Ummer	
M A R	11	15	Nurayum Pathayum	Madhu, P. J. Antony	J. D. Thottan	G. Devarajan	
M A R	13	16	Saritha	Madhu, Vidhubala, Mohan Sharma	P. Govindan	Shyam	
M A R	18	17	Makam Piranna Manka	Jayan, Jayabharathi	N. R. Pillai	V. Dakshinamoorthy	
M A R	25	18	Kaduvaye Pidicha Kiduva	Prem Nazir, Lekshmi	A. B. Raj	V. Dakshinamoorthy	
M A R	25	19	Sreedevi	Sharada, Kamal Haasan	N. Sankaran Nair	G. Devarajan	
A P R	7	20	Kannappanunni	Prem Nazir, Sheela	Kunchako	K. Raghavan	
A P R	14	21	Vishukkani	Prem Nazir, Sharada	J. Sasikumar	Salil Chowdhary	
A P R	14	22	Agninakshathram	Lakshmi, Mohan Sharma	A. Vincent	G. Devarajan	
A P R	14	23	Anjali	Prem Nazir, Sharada	I. V. Sasi	G. Devarajan	
A P R	29	24	Poojakkedukkatha Pookkal	Madhu, Sheela	N. Sankaran Nair	K. Raghavan	
A P R	29	25	Chathurvedam	Prem Nazir, Padmapriya	J. Sasikumar	G. Devarajan	
M A Y	5	26	Aval Oru Devaalayam	Prem Nazir, Jayan	A. B. Raj	M. K. Arjunan	
M A Y	5	27	Sakhakkale Munnoottu	Prem Nazir, Vidhubala	J. Sasikumar	G. Devarajan	
M A Y	12	28	Angeekaaram	Prameela, Sridevi, Vincent	I. V. Sasi	A. T. Ummer	
M A Y	13	29	Mohavum Mukthiyum	Prem Nazir, Sheela	J. Sasikumar	M. K. Arjunan	
M A Y	19	30	Varadakshina	Prem Nazir, Jayabharathi	J. Sasikumar	G. Devarajan	
M A Y	26	31	Choondakkari	Ravi Menon, Anupama	P. Vijayan	Kannur Rajan	
M A Y	28	32	Amme Anupame	Sharada, K. P. Ummer	K. S. Sethumadhavan	M. S. Viswanathan	
J U N	3	33	Mini Mol	Prem Nazir, Soman	J. Sasikumar	G. Devarajan	
J U N	3	34	Neethipeedam	Madhu, Sheela	Crossbelt Mani	G. Devarajan	
J U N	10	35	Manassoru Mayil	Jayabharathi, Vincent	P. Chandrakumar	A. T. Ummer	
J U N	17	36	Abhinivesham	Padmapriya, Ravikumar	I. V. Sasi	Shyam	
J U L	22	37	Lakshmi	Prem Nazir, Sheela	J. Sasikumar	G. Devarajan	
J U L	22	38	Ashtamangalyam	Kamal Haasan, Kanakadurga	P. Gopikumar	M. K. Arjunan	
J U L	22	39	Veedu Oru Swargam	Prem Nazir, Sheela	Jeassy	G. Devarajan	
J U L	22	40	Parivarthanam	Prem Nazir, Srividya	J. Sasikumar	M. S. Viswanathan	
J U L	29	41	Nirakudam	Kamal Haasan, Sreedevi	A. Bhimsingh	Jaya Vijaya	
J U L	29	42	Sangamam	T. G. Ravi, Jose	Hariharan	M. S. Viswanathan	
A U G	5	43	Niraparayum Nilavilakkum	Sheela, Thikkurissy Sukumaran Nair	Singitham Sreenivasa Rao	V. Dakshinamoorthy	
A U G	5	44	Kavilamma	Madhu, Jayan	N. Sankaran Nair	G. Devarajan	
A U G	12	45	Sukradasa	Jayabharathi, Raghavan	Anthikkad Mani	M. K. Arjunan	
A U G	19	46	Sujatha	Prem Nazir, Soman	Hariharan	Ravindra Jain	
A U G	26	47	Sreemurukan	Ponnamma, Thikkurissy Sukumaran Nair	P. Subramaniam	G. Devarajan	
A U G	26	48	Ormakal Marikkumo	Jayan, Kamal Haasan	K. S. Sethumadhavan	M. S. Viswanathan	
A U G	27	49	Itha Ivide Vare	Madhu, Soman	I. V. Sasi	G. Devarajan	
S E P	9	50	Aa Nimisham	Madhu, Sheela	I. V. Sasi	G. Devarajan	
S E P	14	51	Yatheem	Sheela, K. P. Ummer	M. Krishnan Nair	M. S. Baburaj	
S E P	14	52	Sneham	Sukumari, Adoor Bhasi	A. Bhimsingh	Jaya Vijaya	
S E P	15	53	Penpuli	Vincent, Unnimary	Crossbelt Mani	G. Devarajan	
S E P	15	54	Aaraadhana	Madhu, Sharada	Madhu	K. J. Joy	
S E P	15	55	Ammaayi Amma	Sukumari, Jayabharathi	M. Masthan	A. T. Ummer	
S E P	29	56	Ivanente Priyaputhran	Jayan, Prem Nazir	Hariharan	K. J. Joy	
S E P	30	57	Aanandham Paramaanandham	Kamal Haasan, Unnimary	I. V. Sasi	G. Devarajan	
O C T	7	58	Vezhambal	Vincent, Sreedevi	Stanley Jose	M. K. Arjunan	
O C T	7	59	Muhoorthangal	Srividya, M. G. Soman, Sudheer	P. M. Benny	M. K. Arjunan	
O C T	14	60	Anthardaaham	Sridevi, Vincent	I. V. Sasi	M. K. Arjunan	
O C T	14	61	Satyavan Savithri	Kamal Haasan, Sridevi	P. G. Viswambaran	Paravur Devarajan	
O C T	14	62	Bhaaryaavijayam	Jayabharathi, Vincent	A. B. Raj	M. K. Arjunan	
O C T	14	63	Taxi Driver	Raghavan, Satheesh Sathyan	P. N. Menon	Joshi	
O C T	16	64	Yudhakaandam	Madhu, Jayabharathi	Thoppil Bhasi	K. Raghavan	
O C T	21	65	Jagadguru Aadisankaran	Muralimohan, Ponnamma	P. Bhaskaran	V. Dakshinamoorthy	
O C T	21	66	Santha Oru Devatha	Madhu, K. R. Vijaya, Sukumaran	M. Krishnan Nair	M. K. Arjunan	
O C T	27	67	Aparaajitha	Prem Nazir, Sharada	J. Sasikumar	A. T. Ummer	
O C T	27	68	Muttathe Mulla	Prem Nazir, Vidhubala	J. Sasikumar	V. Dakshinamoorthy	
O C T	28	69	Hridayame Sakshi	Prem Nazir, Sharada	I. V. Sasi	M. S. Viswanathan	
N O V	3	70	Harshabashpam	Soman, Yesudas	P. Gopikumar	M. K. Arjunan	
N O V	4	71	Karnaparvam	Jayabharathi, Vincent	Babu Nanthankodu	G. Devarajan	
N O V	10	72	Samudram	Prem Nazir, Sheela	K. Sukumaran Nair	G. Devarajan	
N O V	10	73	Sneha Yamuna	Jayan, Lakshmi	A. T. Raghu	K. J. Joy	
N O V	17	74	Aadhya Paadam	Sheela, Kamal Haasan	Adoor Bhasi	A. T. Ummer	
N O V	17	75	Guruvayur Kesavan	Jayabharathi, Adoor Bhasi	Bharathan	G. Devarajan	
N O V	18	76	Rathimanmadhan	Prem Nazir, Jayabharathi	J. Sasikumar	M. S. Viswanathan	
N O V	25	77	Innale Innu	Prem Nazir, Sheela	I. V. Sasi	G. Devarajan	
N O V	28	78	Chakravarthini	Sumithra, K. P. Ummer	Charles Ayyampally	G. Devarajan	
D E C	1	79	Vidarunna Mottukal	Madhu, Baby Sumathi	P. Subramaniam	G. Devarajan	
D E C	9	80	Tholkan Enikku Manassilla	Prem Nazir, Jayabharathi	Hariharan	Shankar–Ganesh	
D E C	9	81	Sooryakanthi	Sukumaran, Pappu	Baby	Jaya Vijaya	
D E C	9	82	Oonjaal	Sridevi, Soman	I. V. Sasi	G. Devarajan	
D E C	15	83	Thaalappoli	Prameela, Sudheer, Sankaradi	M. Krishnan Nair	V. Dakshinamoorthy	
D E C	18	84	Pattalam Janaki	Sudheer, Jayan	Crossbelt Mani	K. J. Joy	
D E C	23	85	Akshayapaathram	Prem Nazir, Ponnamma	J. Sasikumar	M. S. Viswanathan	
D E C	23	86	Achaaram Ammini Osharam Omana	Prem Nazir, Jayan	Adoor Bhasi	G. Devarajan	
D E C	23	87	Rowdy Rajamma	Madhu, Jayaprabha	P. Subramaniam	G. Devarajan	
D E C	30	88	Randu Lokam	Prem Nazir, Jayan	J. Sasikumar	G. Devarajan	
D E C	31	89	Anugraham	Prem Nazir, Radha Saluja	Melattoor Ravi Varma	Shankar–Ganesh	
D E C	31	90	Nizhale Nee Sakshi	M. G. Soman,vidhubala,Seema (actress)	P. Gopikumar		
D E C	31	91	Swarna Medal	Unnimary, Jameela Malik	P. A. Thomas	Joseph Krishna	

== Dubbed films ==
Movie	Direction	Actors	Music	Lyrics
Velankanni Mathavu	K. Thankappan			
Sthree Janmam	K. Sankar			
Rambha Urvasi Menaka	V. Sambasiva Rao			
Chilanka	K. Vishwanathan			
