= K. Narayanan =

Indian film director

K. Narayanan is an Indian film director, editor, and art director who has worked predominantly in Malayalam cinema. Since his debut in 1953, he has edited more than 200 films in Malayalam and Tamil languages.

== Early life ==
He was born in 1933 at Thikkat House in Nandipuram near Trichur to Kannan Nair and Kalyaniyamma. His father's job with the Indian Railways took the family to Madras, where he spent his childhood. He was married to N. Sarojini and has a daughter, N. Sumathe.

== Film career ==
Narayanan started his film career by assisting Sankar in 1947. His first independent project was Sadarame, a Kannada film. His first film in Malayalam was Ashadeepam (1953). He is a four time recipient of the Kerala State Film Award for Best Editor.

== Filmography ==
=== Malayalam ===
1. Aashadeepam (1953)
2. Arappavan (1961)
3. Tharavaattamma (1966)
4. Ramanan (1967)
5. Pareeksha (1967)
6. Manaswini (1968)
7. Kuruthikkalam (1969)
8. Kaattukurangu (1969)
9. Mooladhanam (1969)
10. Kallichellamma (1969)
11. Thurakkaatha Vaathil (1970)
12. Kalpana (1970)
13. Abhayam (1970)
14. Ambalapraavu (1970)
15. Kaakkathampuraatti (1970)
16. Sthree (1970)
17. Kalithozhi (1971)
18. Raathrivandi (1971)
19. Vimochanasamaram (1971)
20. Muthassi (1971)
21. Siksha (1971)
22. Ernakulam Junction (1971)
23. Ummaachu (1971)
24. Poymukhangal (1973)
25. Prethangalude Thaazhvara (1973)
26. Kaalachakram (1973)
27. Urvasi Bhaarathi (1973)
28. Nathoon (1974)
29. Ulsavam (1975)
30. Chief Guest (1975)
31. Malsaram (1975)
32. Aalinganam (1976)
33. Abhinandanam (1976)
34. Rajaankanam (1976)
35. Prasaadam (1976)
36. Ayalkkaari (1976)
37. Anubhavam (1976)
38. Hridayame Saakshi (1977)
39. Sakhaakkale Munnottu (1977)
40. Randu Lokam (1977)
41. Innale Innu (1977)
42. Akale Aakaasham (1977)
43. Rathimanmadhan (1977)
44. Aanandam Paramaanandam (1977)
45. Anjali (1977)
46. Abhinivesham (1977)
47. Veedu Oru Swargam (1977)
48. Itha Ivide Vare (1977)
49. Anthardaaham (1977)
50. Aa Nimisham (1977)
51. Aasheervaadam (1977)
52. Oonjaal (1977)
53. Angeekaaram (1977)
54. Iniyum Puzhayozhukum (1978)
55. Vadakakku Oru Hridayam (1978)
56. Rathinirvedam (1978)
57. Sthree Oru Dukham (1978)
58. Njaan Njaan Maathram (1978)
59. Avalude Ravukal (1978)
60. Nakshathrangale Kaaval (1978)
61. Anumodanam (1978)
62. Padakkuthira (1978)
63. Beena (1978)
64. Avalku Maranamilla (1978)
65. Ithaa Oru Manushyan (1978)
66. Amarsham (1978)
67. Ee Manoharatheeram (1978)
68. Praarthana (1978)
69. Eetta (1978)
70. Saayoojyam (1979)
71. Itha Oru Theeram (1979)
72. Puthiya Velicham (1979)
73. Pambaram (1979)
74. Kaalam Kaathuninnilla (1979)
75. Alaavudeenum Albuthavilakkum (1979)
76. Manasaa Vaacha Karmanaa (1979)
77. Venalil Oru Mazha (1979)
78. Aarattu (1979)
79. Jeevitham Oru Gaanam (1979)
80. Ezham Kadalinakkare (1979)
81. Idimuzhakkam (1980)
82. Pavizhamuthu (1980)
83. Dooram Arike (1980)
84. Makaravilakku (1980)
85. Angaadi (1980)
86. Lorry (1980)
87. Ivar (1980)
88. Ambalavilakku (1980)
89. Pralayam (1980)
90. Karimbana (1980)
91. Swantham Enna Padam (1980)
92. Naayaattu (1980)
93. Kaanthavalayam (1980)
94. Aswaradham (1980)
95. Meen (1980)
96. Hamsageetham (1981)
97. Munnettam (1981)
98. Thrishna (1981)
99. Orikkalkkoodi (1981)
100. Sphodanam (1981)
101. Ariyappedaatha Rahasyam (1981)
102. Kaattukallan (1981)
103. Thushaaram (1981)
104. Arikkaari Ammu (1981)
105. Aakramanam (1981)
106. Ahimsa (1981)
107. Enthino Pookkunna Pookkal (1982)
108. Ina (1982)
109. Ethiraalikal (1982)
110. Enikkum Oru Divasam (1982)
111. Gaanam (1982)
112. Ee Naadu (1982)
113. Komaram (1982)
114. John Jaffer Janardhanan (1982)
115. Drohi (1982)
116. Veedu (1982)
117. Beedikkunjamma (1982)
118. Sindoorasandhyaykku Mounam (1982)
119. Innallengil Naale (1982)
120. Thadaakam (1982)
121. Irattimadhuram (1982)
122. Aaroodham (1983)
123. Deepaaradhana (1983)
124. Iniyenkilum (1983)
125. Naanayam (1983)
126. Rathilayam (1983)
127. Kaikeyi (1983)
128. Oru Mukham Pala Mukham (1983)
129. America America (1983)
130. Swapnalokam (1983)
131. Uyarangalil (1984)
132. Kaanamarayathu (1984)
133. Lakshmana Rekha (1984)
134. Athiraathram (1984)
135. Aalkoottathil Thaniye (1984)
136. Ningalil Oru Sthree (1984)
137. Aksharangal (1984)
138. Adiyozhukkukal (1984)
139. Njaan Piranna Naattil (1985)
140. Snehicha Kuttathinu (1985)
141. Karimbinpoovinakkare (1985)
142. Anubandham (1985)
143. Angaadikkappurathu (1985)
144. Rangam (1985)
145. Idanilangal (1985)
146. Manaykkale Thatha (1985)
147. Adiverukal (1986)
148. T. P. Balagopalan M. A. (1986)
149. Gandhinagar 2nd Street (1986)
150. Avanazhi (1986)
151. Vaartha (1986)
152. Njaan Kaathorthirikkum (1986)
153. Koodanayum Kaattu (1986)
154. Abhayam Thedi (1986)
155. Aarundivide Chodikkaan (1986)
156. Unnikale Oru Kadha Parayaam (1987)
157. Adimakal Udamakal (1987)
158. Naalkkavala (1987)
159. Yaagaagni (1987)
160. Sreedharante Onnaam Thirumurivu (1987)
161. Kayyethum Doorathu (1987)
162. Nadodikkattu (1987)
163. Ithrayum Kaalam (1987)
164. Ellaavarkkum Nanmakal (1987)
165. 1921 (1988)
166. Abkaari (1988)
167. Orkaappurathu (1988)
168. Mukthi (1988)
169. Anuraagi (1988)
170. Ormayil Ennum (1988)
171. Douthyam (1989)
172. Mrigaya (1989)
173. Aksharathettu (1989)
174. Arhatha (1990)
175. Varthamaanakaalam (1990)
176. Nammude Naadu (1990)
177. Midhya (1990)
178. Sundarimaare Sookshikkuka (1990)
179. Bhoomika (1991)
180. Neelagiri (1991)
181. Inspector Balram (1991)
182. Apaaratha (1992)
183. Kallanum Policum (1992)
184. Oru Kochu Bhoomikulukkam (1992)
185. Arthana (1992)
186. Jackpot (1993)
187. Yaadavam (1993)
188. Devaasuram (1993)
189. Chukkaan (1994)
190. Karma (1995)
191. Rajaputhran (1996)
192. Anubhoothi (1997)
193. Varnapakittu (1997)
194. Unnimaaya (2000)
195. Thaniye (2007)
196. Muttayi Kallanum Mammaaliyum (2015)

=== Tamil ===
1. Sivagangai Seemai (1959)
2. Paadha Kaanikkai (1962)
3. Panathottam (1963)
4. Ezhai Pangalan (1963)
5. Andavan Kattalai (1964)
6. Anbu Karangal (1965)
7. Panchavarna Kili (1965)
8. Gowri Kalyanam (1966)
9. Arasa Kattalai (1967)
10. Kudiyirundha Koyil (1968)
11. Kallum Kaniyagum (1968)
12. Maattukara Velan (1970)
13. Naan Yen Pirandhen (1972)
14. Annamitta Kai (1972)
15. Pattampoochi (1975)
16. Kuppathu Raja (1979)
17. Allaudinaum Arputha Vilakkum (1979)
18. Ore Vaanam Ore Bhoomi (1979)
19. Pagalil Oru Iravu (1979)
20. Thisai Maariya Paravaigal (1979)
21. Kaali (1980)
22. Guru (1980)
23. Illam (1988)
24. Kolangal (1995)

=== Direction ===
1. Kaalachakram (1973)
2. Nathoon (1974)
3. Malsaram (1975)
4. Sundarimare Sookshikkuka (1990)

== Art director ==
1. Ragam (1975)
2. Johnny (1993)
