= Manasa Vacha Karmana =

- Directed by: I. V. Sasi
- Written by: Akalevyan; A. Sheriff (dialogues)
- Screenplay by: A. Sheriff
- Produced by: P. V. Gangadharan
- Starring: Jayabharathi; M. G. Soman; Sukumaran; Seema
- Edited by: K. Narayanan
- Music by: A. T. Ummer; Lyrics: Bichu Thirumala
- Production company: Grihalakshmi Productions
- Distributed by: Grihalakshmi Productions
- Release date: 10 August 1979
- Country: India
- Language: Malayalam
- Box office: Super Hit

Manasa Vacha Karmana is a 1979 Indian Malayalam film, directed by I. V. Sasi and produced by P. V. Gangadharan. The film stars Jayabharathi, Sukumaran, M. G. Soman and Seema in the lead roles and was scored by A. T. Ummer. The film has art direction by Kalalayam Ravi.

== Cast ==
- Jayabharathi as Sumithra
- Sukumaran as Sukumaran
- M. G. Soman as Dr. Venugopal
- Seema as Geetha
- K. P. A. C. Sunny as Menon
- Sankaradi as Geetha's father
- Nellikodu Bhaskaran as Parameshwaran Pillai
- Cochin Haneefa as Rameshan
- Latha as Lathika Menon
- Kunjandi as Geetha's uncle
- K. T. C. Abdulla as Rameshan's friend

== Soundtrack ==
The music was composed by A. T. Ummer and the lyrics were written by Bichu Thirumala.

No.	Song	Singers	Lyrics	Length (m:ss)
1	"Homam Kazhinja Hridayangal"	K. J. Yesudas	Bichu Thirumala	
2	"Madanavichaaram"	K. J. Yesudas, B. Vasantha	Bichu Thirumala	
3	"Nimishangal Polum"	Vani Jairam, Jolly Abraham	Bichu Thirumala	
4	"Nimishangal Polum" (F)	Vani Jairam	Bichu Thirumala	
5	"Prabhaatham Poomarakkombil"	S. Janaki	Bichu Thirumala	
6	"Saandramaaaya Chandrikayil"	K. J. Yesudas	Bichu Thirumala	

== See also ==
- Manasa, vacha, karmana
