= Ore Vaanam Ore Bhoomi =

- Theatrical release poster
- Directed by: I. V. Sasi
- Written by: Aleppey Sheriff
- Produced by: N. G. John
- Starring: Jaishankar; K. R. Vijaya; Seema; Reena; Vidhubala
- Cinematography: Ramachandra Babu; Vipindas
- Edited by: K. Narayanan
- Music by: M. S. Viswanathan
- Production company: Geo Movie Productions
- Release date: 22 June 1979
- Country: India
- Language: Tamil

Ore Vaanam Ore Bhoomi (spelt onscreen as Orey Vaanam Orey Bhoomi; transl. One sky, one Earth) is a 1979 Indian Tamil-language film directed by I. V. Sasi, starring Jaishankar, K. R. Vijaya and Seema. It was released on 22 June 1979. The film was remade in Malayalam as Ezhamkadalinakkare (1979) by the same director.

== Plot ==
Lakshmi is a young woman who is the main bread winner of her family. She single-handedly shoulders the responsibility of caring for her elderly father, brothers, and sisters. Determined to improve her family's financial situation, Lakshmi accepts an opportunity to work as a nurse in the United States and moves to New York. There, she works hard and regularly sends money back home to support her family in India.

While working in America, a foreign doctor falls in love with Lakshmi. Although he wishes to marry her, Lakshmi finds herself torn between her family responsibilities and her commitment to Indian traditions.

Meanwhile, the hero, Shankar, arrives in America. He comes at the invitation of a foreigner whom he had once helped in India. However, upon reaching America, he learns that the man has passed away. Alone in a foreign country with no support, Shankar struggles to find work and faces many hardships.

Later, Lakshmi brings her younger sister Seetha to America. Unlike Lakshmi, Seetha is fascinated by the Western way of life and begins attending parties and embracing a more carefree lifestyle. This leads to disagreements between the sisters. When Seetha is about to fall into the trap of some unscrupulous people, Shankar steps in and rescues her.

At the same time, Lakshmi's brother Somu also comes to America. Driven by a desire to become rich quickly, he becomes involved in gambling and falls into the company of criminals. As a result, the family is plunged into a serious crisis. Shankar fights to save Somu and protect the family from the dangers that surround them.

== Cast ==
- Jaishankar as Shankar
- K. R. Vijaya as Lakshmi
- Ravikumar as Somu
- Seema as Seetha
- Reena as Latha
- V. K. Ramasamy as Lakshmi and Somu's father
- Manorama
- Y. G. Mahendran as Manorama's son (cameo appearance)
- Janardhanan as Raghu
- Padmini

== Production ==
Ore Vaanam Ore Bhoomi was said to be the first Tamil film to be shot in the United States while also shot at Canada and New York. Padmini made her acting comeback with this film. The filming was held at locations like Niagara Falls and Kennedy Airport.

== Soundtrack ==
The music was composed by M. S. Viswanathan.

Track listing
No.	Title	Lyrics	Singer(s)	Length
1.	"Malai Raani Mundhaanai"	Kannadasan	Jolly Abraham, Vani Jairam
2.	"Sorgaththilae Naam"	Kannadasan	P. Susheela, S. P. Balasubrahmanyam
3.	"Valamaana Bhoomiyil Sugamaana"	Kannadasan	K. J. Yesudas
4.	"Ore Vaanam Ore Bhoomi"	Vaali	T. M. Soundararajan
5.	"Mangala Poomazhai"	Kannadasan	Vani Jairam

== Reception ==
Kutty Krishnan of Kalki wrote neither the sky nor the earth; it is a hanging space between the two.
