= Pagalil Oru Iravu =

1979 film by I. V. Sasi

- Title card
- Directed by: I. V. Sasi
- Screenplay by: Mahendran
- Story by: Sheriff
- Produced by: Ramachandran
- Starring: Vijayakumar; Sridevi; Ravikumar; Seema
- Cinematography: N. A. Thara
- Edited by: K. Narayanan
- Music by: Ilaiyaraaja
- Production company: Murali Movies
- Release date: 15 August 1979
- Country: India
- Language: Tamil

Pagalil Oru Iravu (transl. A night in the day; also spelled Pakalil Oru Iravu) is a 1979 Indian Tamil-language film directed by I. V. Sasi, starring Vijayakumar, Sridevi, Seema and Ravikumar. It is a remake of Sasi's own Malayalam film Aalinganam (1976), also starring Sridevi. The film was released on 15 August 1979.

== Plot ==
Rajee, a doctor, has a love interest in her cousin, Vinod, but Vinod loves Bindhu, a shy and down-to-earth girl. Rajee sacrifices her love and Vinod marries Bindhu. Bindhu's mother hides some truth about Bindhu to others. Everything goes well for Bindhu and she becomes pregnant but she falls down the stairs and has a miscarriage. Following this, she experiences nightmares and is diagnosed to be suffering from retrograde hysteria. Ramesh, brother of Rajee, who returns from abroad, is shocked to see Bindhu and he recollects the past. Once during the adolescent days, Bindhu had Ramesh while targeting mangoes. Injured and unconscious, Ramesh is given first aid by Bindhu by tearing a piece of her short gown. Ramesh is attracted to her and unknowingly, Bindhu loses her virginity to Ramesh. Not knowing whom he was, she gets pregnant. Her mother takes her to a hill-side village to get an abortion by native treatment, due to which she loses memory of her adolescent age.

Bindhu, who is being treated for hysteria, frequently returns to a hysteric state more often. In the desire to know about her past, Major Sundarrajan compels her mother to reveal the truth. He informs Rajee about her past and she cures Bindhu. A few days later, Vinod takes Bindhu to a hill resort to bring about a change in her. There, Bindhu witnesses the women who aborted her, gets hysterical and becomes unconscious. Vinod learns the truth and he disowns her. After she recovers, she returns, but Vinod isn't ready to accept her as he feels that she has cheated him by hiding the truth. But Ramesh admits that he was the culprit behind her condition and commits suicide. Finally, Vinod understands the truth and accepts Bindhu as his wife.

== Cast ==
- Vijayakumar as Vinod
- Sridevi as Bindhu
- Ravikumar as Ramesh
- Seema as Rajee
- Major Sundarrajan
- V. K. Ramasamy
- Suruli Rajan
- Pushpalatha

== Production ==
The film began production in September 1978 at Arunachalam Studios.

== Soundtrack ==
The music was composed by Ilaiyaraaja, and the lyrics were written by Kannadasan. The song "Ilamai Enum Poongaatru" is set in the Carnatic raga known as Chalanata, and was written at Hotel Palmgrove, Madras. It attained popularity, and was later re-used in another Tamil film Pagadi Aattam (2017).

Song	Singers	Length
"Kalaiyo Silaiyo Ithu Ponmaan Nila"	Jayachandran	4:02
"Thaamtha Theemtha Aadum"	S. Janaki	5:13
"Ponnaram Poovaram"	S. P. Balasubrahmanyam	4:15
"Ilamai Enum Poongaatru"	S. P. Balasubrahmanyam	4:27
"Thottam Konda Rasave"	Ilaiyaraaja, Jency	5:13

The film was dubbed into Telugu as Nuvve Naa Srimathi and lyrics were written by Rajashri.

Song	Singers
"Vayyaram"	S. P. Balasubrahmanyam
"Thaam Thadheem"	Vani Jayaram
"Kalavo Kathavo"	Madhavapeddi Ramesh
"Gorinkanti"	S. P. Sailaja, Madhavapeddi Ramesh
"Tolivayasu"	S. P. Balasubrahmanyam

== Reception ==
Kalki appreciated the film for its innovative storyline, visuals, songs, cast performances and Sasi's direction.
