= Ezhamkadalinakkare =

- Directed by: I. V. Sasi
- Written by: A. Sheriff
- Produced by: N. G. John
- Starring: MG Soman; KR Vijaya; Ravikumar; Seema; Janardanan; Joe Waddington
- Cinematography: Ramachandra Babu
- Edited by: K. Narayanan
- Music by: M. S. Viswanathan
- Production company: Geo Movies
- Release date: 31 August 1979
- Country: India
- Language: Malayalam

Ezhamkadalinakkare (transl. Across The Seventh Sea) is a 1979 Indian Malayalam-language film, directed by I. V. Sasi and produced by N. G. John. The film stars K. R. Vijaya in the lead role, whereas supporting roles were played by Soman, Seema, Ravikumar, Vidhubala, P. Bhaskaran, Henry Marsal, Janardanan and Joe Waddington. It is the first Malayalam film to be shot in North America, with Manhattan being one of its locations. The song "Suralokajaladhaara" was filmed near in Niagara Falls, Ontario, Canada. This film was a remake of the Tamil film Ore Vaanam Ore Bhoomi by the same director.

== Plot ==
Lakshmi (K. R. Vijaya), a nurse and the eldest daughter of retired teacher Karunakaran, is the main provider for her family, which includes her siblings Chandran, Lata and Seetha. When she secures a nursing job at a hospital in New York, the family hopes that her earnings will improve their circumstances. In America, Lakshmi attracts the attention of Dr. Jackson, who proposes marriage to her, but she is reluctant to accept.

Soman (M. G. Soman), a taxi driver from Ernakulam, receives an invitation to visit America from Williams, an American tourist who was impressed by his service. Soman travels to New York, only to learn that Williams has died. Left to fend for himself in an unfamiliar city, he takes up various jobs to make a living.

After returning to India for Lata's wedding, Lakshmi takes her younger sister Seetha (Seema), who has qualified as a nurse, back to New York. Seetha becomes attracted to the city's nightlife and, unable to adjust to living under Lakshmi's supervision, begins living independently. When she becomes vulnerable to a sexual assault after drinking, Soman intervenes and rescues her.

Lakshmi's brother Chandran (Ravikumar) subsequently arrives in New York. Drawn to the city's dance halls and gambling establishments, he develops gambling debts and falls into the clutches of a mafia boss named Nicholas. Linda (Vidhubala) attempts to help him, while Soman becomes involved in the unfolding events. The film follows the characters as they confront the dangers and challenges of life in a foreign country.

== Cast ==
- M. G. Soman as Soman
- K. R. Vijaya
- Seema
- Vidhubala
- Ravikumar
- Janardanan
- Reena
- Padmini
- P. Bhaskaran
- Henry Marsal
- Joe Waddington

== Soundtrack ==
The music was composed by M. S. Viswanathan and the lyrics were written by P. Bhaskaran.

Song	Singers
"Madhumaasam Bhoomithan"	P. Jayachandran
"Madhumaasam Bhoomithan"	K. J. Yesudas
"Malaranippanthalil"	Vani Jairam
"Suralokajaladhaara"	Vani Jairam, Jolly Abraham
"Swargathin Nandana"	P. Susheela, P. Jayachandran
