= Enthino Pookunna Pookkal =

- Poster
- Directed by: Gopinath Babu
- Written by: A. Sheriff
- Produced by: Raja Cheriyan; Sasi Menon
- Starring: Mammootty; Mohanlal; Ratheesh; Zarina Wahab
- Cinematography: C. Ramachandra Menon
- Edited by: K. Narayanan
- Music by: Shyam
- Production company: Rajath Chithra
- Distributed by: Vijaya & Vijaya
- Release date: 6 August 1982
- Country: India
- Language: Malayalam

Enthino Pookunna Pookkal (transl. Why do flowers bloom ? ) is a 1982 Indian Malayalam-language family drama film directed by Gopinath Babu (in his directorial debut) and written by A. Sheriff. It stars Mammootty, Mohanlal, Ratheesh and Zarina Wahab. The film features music composed by Shyam.

== Plot ==
Savithri works as a maid for Surendran and his mother. Sivaraman is Savithri's neighbour who is like a brother to her. Sivaraman and Surendran hate each other. Surendran is a cruel and abusive man who Savithri doesn't love. Surendran however deceives Savithri with false promises and gets her pregnant, and later throws her out of his house.

Sivaraman takes Savithri into his house (treating her like his own sister). Savithri gives birth to a baby boy, who dies shortly afterwards.

Vishwanathan is a factory owner who is a single parent of his only daughter. Sivaraman works in his factory and after Viswanathan meets Savithri, he wants to marry her, as his daughter likes Savithri. Sivaraman gets Savithri married to Vishwanathan and persuades her not to reveal her past (despite her intention to so).

Surendran happens to be Vishwanathan's old friend, and they meet after a long time. Surendran lies to Vishwanathan that Savithri had illicit relations with Sivaraman, and that Sivaraman is not her actually her brother.

Viswanathan gets angry with both Savithri and Sivaraman, accusing them of deceiving him. Sivaraman however convinces Viswanathan that Surendran is the one who is lying and that he was the one who had impregnated Savithri. He also tells that it was him who persuaded Savithri not to reveal her past (despite Savithri wanting to do so). Viswanathan and Savithri reconcile.

In the climax, Surendran tries to molest Savithri again, but Savithri slaps him in the face and closes the door. Vishwanathan hears about this and he is ready to kill Surendran. Sivaraman enters the scene and defeats Surendran in a fight once again and stabs him. Surendran then dies. This film ends with Sivaraman reconciling with Savithri and Vishwanathan.

== Cast ==
- Mammootty as Sivaraman
- Mohanlal as Surendran
- Ratheesh as Vishwanathan
- Zarina Wahab as Savithri
- Sukumari
- Sankaradi as Kurupp
- Mala Aravindan as Pillai
- Santhakumari as Madhavi
- Sathyachithra as Prameela
- Baby Sonia
- Sudha as Sumathi
- Vijayan Pallikkara
- Stalin
- Master Rivins
- Sudha

== Soundtrack ==
The music was composed by Shyam and the lyrics were written by Poovachal Khader.

No.	Song	Singers	Lyrics	Length
1	"Manjarikal Manjushakal"	K. J. Yesudas	Poovachal Khader	3:51
2	"Neraanu Neraanu"	K. J. Yesudas, S. Janaki	Poovachal Khader	4:32
3	"Po Po Kaalamone"	K. J. Yesudas	Poovachal Khader	4:13
4	"Vinnil Ninnum Vannirangum"	Vani Jairam	Poovachal Khader	5:00

== Release ==
The film was released on 6 August 1982.
