= Prathidhawani =

- Directed by: Vipin Das
- Written by: A Sheriff
- Screenplay by: A Sheriff
- Produced by: Upasana
- Starring: Raghavan; Radhamani; Rani Chandra; Syamkumar
- Cinematography: I V Sasi
- Music by: M. L. Srikanth
- Production company: Upasana
- Distributed by: Upasana
- Release date: 2 September 1971
- Country: India
- Language: Malayalam

Prathidhawani is a 1971 Indian Malayalam-language film, directed by Vipin Das and produced by Upasana. The film stars Raghavan, Radhamani, Rani Chandra and Syamkumar. The film's score was composed by M. L. Srikanth.

== Cast ==
- Raghavan
- Radhamani
- Rani Chandra
- Syamkumar
- Usha Saraswathi
- Usharani
- Vasu Pradeep
- Aarathi
