= Abhayam Thedi =

1986 Indian film by I. V. Sasi

- Directed by: I. V. Sasi
- Written by: M. T. Vasudevan Nair
- Starring: Mohanlal; Shobhana; Sukumari; Thilakan
- Cinematography: Vasanth Kumar
- Edited by: K. Narayanan
- Music by: Shyam
- Production company: Classic Arts
- Distributed by: Classic Arts
- Release date: 7 February 1986
- Country: India
- Language: Malayalam

Abhayam Thedi (transl. Seeking refuge) is a 1986 Indian Malayalam-language drama film directed by I. V. Sasi and written by M. T. Vasudevan Nair. The film stars Mohanlal, Shobhana, Sukumari, and Thilakan. The film has musical score by Shyam.

== Plot ==
The film tells the story of a girl called Miranda, who returns to her late father's ancestral home after falling out with her mother. Miranda lives in Mumbai with her mother. Her father, a Hindu, had married an Anglo-Indian woman and was thus expelled from his ancestral house by his father. After her father's death, Miranda's mother started bringing men to their house and who would try to molest Miranda. After her mother decides to marry one of her boyfriends who tries to grope Miranda, Miranda runs to Kerala and her father's ancestral home. After the initial hesitation, her grandfather warmly welcomes her to the family. Her father's sister is however very hostile towards her. Miranda befriends her first cousins and wins them over with Appu/Appettan being the nicest one. Miranda finds peace, happiness, and a sense of belonging in her ancestral home. Her joy is short-lived when her abusive stepfather comes to take her away. But she refuses to go with him and stays behind. The film ends sad as Miranda dies in her sleep leaving her relatives devastated.

== Cast ==
- Mohanlal as Appu / Appettan
- Shobhana as Miranda / Meera
- Thilakan as Meera's grandfather P. K. Nair
- Sukumari as Ammalukutty
- Ramachandran as Madhavankutty
- KPAC Lalitha as Bhargavi
- Janardanan as C. S. Nair
- Ashokan as Anil
- Rohini as Vasanthi
- Raveendran as Rajendran
- Baby Anju as Asha
- Kuthiravattam Pappu as Kumaran
- Y. Vijaya as Tessy
- Santhakumari as Paarukutty

== Soundtrack ==
The music was composed by Shyam and the lyrics were written by S. Ramesan Nair.

No.	Song	Singers	Lyrics	Length (m:ss)
1	"Kunnathoru Kunniludichu"	Unni Menon, Lathika	S. Ramesan Nair	
2	"Maanathu Vethaykkana"	Unni Menon, Lathika	S. Ramesan Nair	
3	"Medakkonnaykku"	Krishnachandran, Lathika	S. Ramesan Nair	
4	"Thaathintha They"	P. Jayachandran	S. Ramesan Nair	
