= Aa Nimisham =

- Poster
- Directed by: I. V. Sasi
- Written by: A. Sheriff
- Screenplay by: Sherif
- Produced by: K. J. Joseph
- Starring: Madhu; Sheela; Sridevi; Kaviyoor Ponnamma
- Cinematography: C. Ramachandra Menon
- Edited by: K. Narayanan
- Music by: G. Devarajan
- Production company: Cherupushpam Films
- Release date: 9 September 1977
- Running time: 130 minutes
- Country: India
- Language: Malayalam

Aa Nimisham (transl. That Moment) is a 1977 Indian Malayalam-language drama film, directed by I. V. Sasi and produced by K. J. Joseph. The film stars Madhu, Sheela, Sridevi and Kaviyoor Ponnamma . The film has musical score by G. Devarajan. The film was remade in Telugu as Guppedu Manasu and in Tamil as Nool Veli. Both remakes were directed by K. Balachander and were released in late 1979.

== Cast ==
- Madhu
- Sheela
- Sridevi
- Kaviyoor Ponnamma
- Ashalatha
- Francis
- Baby Sumathi
- Chandrakala
- Kuthiravattam Pappu
- Ravikumar
- Sarala
- Alex

== Soundtrack ==
The music was composed by G. Devarajan and the lyrics were written by Yusufali Kechery.

No.	Song	Singers	Lyrics	Length (m:ss)
1	"Ayalathe Janalil"	K. J. Yesudas	Yusufali Kechery	
2	"Chaayam Thecha"	K. J. Yesudas, P. Madhuri	Yusufali Kechery	
3	"Malare Maathalamalare"	K. J. Yesudas	Yusufali Kechery	
4	"Manasse Neeyoru"	K. J. Yesudas	Yusufali Kechery	
5	"Paarilirangiya"	P. Jayachandran, P. Madhuri, Shakeela Balakrishnan	Yusufali Kechery	
