= Hridayame Sakshi =

- Directed by: I. V. Sasi
- Written by: A. Sheriff
- Screenplay by: A. Sheriff
- Produced by: N.C. Menon
- Starring: Prem Nazir; Sharada; K. P. Ummer; Sankaradi
- Cinematography: Vipindas
- Edited by: K. Narayanan
- Music by: M. S. Viswanathan
- Release date: 28 October 1977
- Country: India
- Language: Malayalam

Hridayame Sakshi (transl. The Heart is Witness) is a 1977 Indian Malayalam-language film, directed by I. V. Sasi. The film stars Prem Nazir, Sharada, K. P. Ummer and Sankaradi in the lead roles.

== Cast ==
- Prem Nazir as Murali
- Sharada as Kamala
- K. P. Ummer as Vasudevan
- Sankaradi as Kurup
- Bahadoor as Narayanan

== Soundtrack ==
The music was composed by M. S. Viswanathan and the lyrics were written by Sreekumaran Thampi.

No.	Song	Singers	Lyrics	Length (m:ss)
1	"Ezhu Nirangalilethu Manoharam"	Ambili, K. P. Brahmanandan	Sreekumaran Thampi	
2	"Manassillengil"	K. J. Yesudas	Sreekumaran Thampi	
3	"Manassupole Jeevitham"	P. Susheela, Chorus	Sreekumaran Thampi	
4	"Pirinju Povukayo"	Ambili, Chorus, Saibaba	Sreekumaran Thampi	
5	"Vasanthame Nee Vannu"	S. Janaki	Sreekumaran Thampi	
