= Eeta =

- Theatrical release poster
- Directed by: I. V. Sasi
- Screenplay by: Alleppey Sheriff
- Story by: Rajamani
- Produced by: K. J. Joseph
- Starring: Kamal Haasan; Madhu; Sheela; Seema
- Cinematography: C. Ramachandra Menon
- Edited by: K. Narayanan
- Music by: G. Devarajan
- Production company: Cherupushpam Films
- Distributed by: Cherupushpam Films
- Release date: 10 November 1978
- Country: India
- Language: Malayalam

Yaetta or Eeta is a Malayalam film released in 1978. Directed by I. V. Sasi, it stars Kamal Haasan, Madhu, Sheela and Seema. It deals with a love triangle: Sheela and Seema fall in love with Kamal Haasan. The movie is known for some steamy scenes. M. G. Soman played the cunning villain Gopalan. Kamal Haasan won the Filmfare Award for Best Actor – Malayalam. It was dubbed and released in Tamil as Inba Thagam.

== Plot ==
Gopalan runs a local cane wholesale business where he purchases canes from workers and sells them for a high price. But he is a dishonest person as he smuggles in sandalwood too, in the guise of his cane business. Varuthunni is the chief of workers and they believe Gopalan. Varuthunni's adopted son Ramu is in love with Sreedevi, daughter of Narayanan, a co-worker of Varuthunni. Annamma is a widow and she too likes Ramu, even though he is younger than her.

Gopalan gets caught in sandalwood smuggling, but escapes by blaming Varuthunni. The conflict between Varuthunni and Gopalan creates issues among the cane workers and most of them join forces with Varuthunni as he is an honest person. The workers decide to provide cane only to Varuthunni and not to Gopalan, which hurts Gopalan's business and his equation with his boss. In the meantime, Annamma, seduces Ramu and they become intimate.

Gopalan's team destroys Varuthunni's cane stacks and thus the issue between the two gets bigger. Sensing the danger of the situation, Gopalan decides to bump off Varuthunni, but this plan was informed to Ramu, who is down by fever by Varuthunni's friend. At the same time, Annamma reveals to Ramu that she is pregnant.

Shattered, Ramu, unable to make a decision frantically goes in search of his father Varuthunni to save him from the death plot of Gopalan, but he is beaten to pulp by Gopalan's gang. He traces his father, but before he is informed of the plot, Gopalan shoots Varuthunni, but the bullet hits Ramu as he jumps in front of his father to save him. Shattered, Varuthunni kills Gopalan and Ramu in his last moments requests his father to take care of his child, now carried by Annamma, and dies in the lap of his loving father Varuthunni shattering many dreams and hopes.

== Cast ==
- Kamal Haasan as Ramu
- Madhu as Varuthunni
- Sheela as Annamma
- Seema as Sreedevi
- M. G. Soman as Gopalan
- Jose Prakash as Narayanan
- Kuthiravattam Pappu as Paramu
- Sankaradi as Annamma's Father
- Meena
- Kaviyoor Ponnamma as Philomina, Annamma's Mother
- Junior Sheela
- Kottayam Santha
- Janardhanan as Kurup
- Prem Prakash as Abraham

== Soundtrack ==
The music was composed by G. Devarajan and the lyrics were written by Yusufali Kechery.

No.	Title	Lyrics	Singer(s)	Length
1.	"Malayattoor Malancharivile"	Yusufali Kechery	K. J. Yesudas, P. Susheela
2.	"Murukkichuvannatho"	Yusufali Kechery	K. J. Yesudas
3.	"Odi Vilayaadiva"	Yusufali Kechery	P. Madhuri
4.	"Thullikkorukudam"	Yusufali Kechery	K. J. Yesudas, P. Madhuri & Chorus

== Awards ==
Filmfare Awards South

- Kamal Haasan won Filmfare Award for Best Actor – Malayalam.
- I. V. Sasi won Filmfare Award for Best Director – Malayalam.
