= Kaantha Valayam =

- Directed by: I. V. Sasi
- Written by: Thalassery Raghavan
- Screenplay by: T. Damodaran
- Starring: Jayan; Krishnachandran; Mohan Sharma; Bahadoor
- Cinematography: K. Ramachandra Babu
- Edited by: K. Narayanan
- Music by: Shyam
- Production company: TV Combines
- Distributed by: TV Combines
- Release date: 19 June 1980
- Country: India
- Language: Malayalam

Kaantha Valayam is a 1980 Indian Malayalam film, directed by I. V. Sasi. The film stars Jayan, Mohan Sharma and Seema in the lead roles. The film explores the powerful magnetic attraction between the heroine Mary Hans and a Mysterious Stranger. Jayan's character does not have a name throughout the movie and even his background is kept deliberately mysterious with a few hints.The film has musical score by Shyam.

== Plot ==
Mary Hans was once the cherished daughter of her affluent parents and the beloved sister of her younger siblings. However circumstances changes as her parents die one after another and she leaves for Chennai with her fiancé Stanley where he's currently working. Mary herself finds employment.Their marriage keeps getting postponed as Mary needs to save every penny for her family back home. It is then she learns the many secrets which Stanley has been keeping away from her. One of which had broken her family. She spurns his love as it had always been spurred by his guilt. They break up and Mary gets further disappointed as her beloved siblings back home have also broken up - each leaving on his/her path.

Mary had run across a mysterious charismatic stranger several times and there's a powerful magnetic attraction between them which she did not previously pursue as she had been in love with her fiancé. However at a vulnerable moment he rescues her and rapes her. Mary finds herself not only forgiving him but also falling in love with him as the two embark on an affair. However he's too damaged and cynical due to an abusive childhood and youth and spurns her love while craving it all the same. Their relationship is built on a powerful attraction and loneliness of two otherwise strong people who will not show their tender sides to the world. They fall into a toxic relationship taunting each other all the time - her about his lack of love and him about the temporary nature of the affair and her place in his life. Just when the mysterious stranger finally believes in Mary's love and makes his way towards her, Mary's ex-fiancé comes to bid her goodbye as he is leaving the town.

== Cast ==
- Jayan as Manushyan
- Seema as Mary Hans
- Mohan Sharma as Stanley Green
- Bahadoor as Mammad
- Meena as Margaret/Maggie
- Ravikumar as Shyam
- Ushakumari as Sati
- Kaviyoor Ponnamma as Mariyamma
- Sreelatha Namboothiri as Eveline
- Sumathi as Pamela Hans
- Krishnachandran as Lional Hans
- Vanchiyoor Radha as Rudramma
- Kottayam Santha as Reetha Hans

== Soundtrack ==
The music was composed by Shyam and the lyrics were written by Ettumanoor Somadasan.

No.	Song	Singers	Lyrics	Length (m:ss)
1	"Ee Nimisham"	K. J. Yesudas, Vani Jairam	Ettumanoor Somadasan	
2	"Oru sugandham Maathram"	K. J. Yesudas	Ettumanoor Somadasan	
3	"Palliyankanathil"	S. Janaki	Ettumanoor Somadasan	
4	"Shilpi Poyal Shilayude Dukham"	K. J. Yesudas	Ettumanoor Somadasan	
