= Anjali (1977 film) =

- അഞ്ജലി(ചലച്ചിത്രം))
- Directed by: I. V. Sasi
- Written by: A. Sheriff
- Screenplay by: A. Sheriff
- Produced by: A. Raghunath
- Starring: Prem Nazir; Sharada; Jayan; MG Soman; Adoor Bhasi
- Cinematography: C. Ramachandra Menon
- Edited by: K. Narayanan
- Music by: G. Devarajan
- Production company: Sanjay Productions
- Distributed by: Sanjay Productions
- Release date: 14 April 1977
- Country: India
- Language: Malayalam

Anjali (മലയാളം: അഞ്ജലി(ചലച്ചിത്രം)) is a 1977 Indian Malayalam film, directed by I V Sasi and produced by A Reghunath. The film stars Prem Nazir, Sharada, M. G. Soman, Jayan, Adoor Bhasi, Sankaradi, Bahadoor, Janardanan, Kuthiravattam Pappu, and Rajakokila in the lead roles.

== Cast ==
- Prem Nazir
- Sharada
- M. G. Soman
- Jayan
- Adoor Bhasi
- Sankaradi
- Bahadoor
- Janardanan
- Kuthiravattam Pappu
- Rajakokila

== Soundtrack ==
The music was composed by G. Devarajan and the lyrics were written by Sreekumaran Thampi.

No.	Song	Singers	Lyrics	Length (m:ss)
1	"Ellaarum Pokunnu"	K. J. Yesudas	Sreekumaran Thampi	
2	"Januvari Raavil"	K. J. Yesudas	Sreekumaran Thampi	
3	"Panineerppoovinte"	P. Madhuri	Sreekumaran Thampi	
4	"Pulari Thedi Pokum"	P. Jayachandran, Karthikeyan, Srikanth	Sreekumaran Thampi	
