= Aanandham Paramaanandham =

1977 film by I. V. Sasi

- Poster
- Directed by: I. V. Sasi
- Screenplay by: A. Sheriff
- Based on: Anubavi Raja Anubavi (1967) by K. Balachander
- Produced by: Jameela, Leela
- Starring: Kamal Haasan; Unni Mary; Chandrakala; Ravikumar
- Cinematography: Vipindas
- Edited by: K. Narayanan
- Music by: G. Devarajan
- Production company: Jaleela Enterprises
- Distributed by: Evershine
- Release date: 30 September 1977
- Country: India
- Language: Malayalam

Aanandham Paramaanandham is a 1977 Indian Malayalam-language comedy film directed by I. V. Sasi. The film stars Kamal Haasan, Unni Mary, Chandrakala and Ravikumar. The film has musical score by G. Devarajan. It is a remake of the 1967 Tamil film Anubavi Raja Anubavi. This is considered as Sasi's only comedy movie.

== Cast ==
- Kamal Haasan as Babu, Shekarankutty (dual role)
- Unni Mary (Deepa) as Raji
- Chandrakala as Rekha
- Ravikumar as Raju
- Roja Ramani as Ammini
- Sukumari as Babu & Shekharankutty's mother
- KPAC Lalitha as Lalitha
- Bahadoor as Chandrashekharan
- Janardanan as Inspector Raghavan
- Kunchan as secretary
- Kuthiravattam Pappu as Pappu
- Paravoor Bharathan as Advocate Sadashivan
- T. P. Madhavan as Advocate
- Uma Bharani
- P. R. Menon as Manager Menon

== Production ==
Anandam Paramanandam film is directed by I. V. Sasi, produced by Jameela and Leela under the production banner Jaleela Enterprises. A. Sheriff wrote the dialogues. The black-and-white film was given a "U" (Unrestricted) certificate by the Central Board of Film Certification without cuts. The final length of the film was 4,243.03 metres (13,920.7 ft).

== Soundtrack ==
The music was composed by G. Devarajan and the lyrics were written by Sreekumaran Thampi.

No.	Song	Singers	Lyrics	Length (m:ss)
1	"Aananda Vaanathin"	P. Madhuri, B. Vasantha	Sreekumaran Thampi	
2	"Aanandam Paramaanandam"	P. Susheela, P. Madhuri	Sreekumaran Thampi	
3	"Koodiyaattam Kaanan"	K. J. Yesudas, P. Madhuri	Sreekumaran Thampi	
4	"Koodiyattam Kaanaan" (Bit)	K. J. Yesudas, P. Madhuri	Sreekumaran Thampi	
5	"Maalaakhamaarude Manamozhuki"	P. Susheela	Sreekumaran Thampi	
6	"Wonderful"	K. J. Yesudas, Nilambur Karthikeyan	Sreekumaran Thampi	
