= Allauddinum Albhutha Vilakkum =

1979 film by I. V. Sasi

- Poster in Malayalam
- Directed by: I. V. Sasi
- Written by: A. Sheriff (Malayalam); Vietnam Veedu Sundaram (Tamil)
- Starring: Kamal Haasan; Rajinikanth; Jayabharathi; Sripriya
- Cinematography: Ramachandra Babu
- Edited by: K. Narayanan
- Music by: G. Devarajan
- Production company: Supriya Creations
- Release dates: 14 April 1979 (Malayalam); 8 June 1979 (Tamil)
- Running time: 142 minutes
- Country: India
- Languages: Malayalam; Tamil

Allauddinum Albhutha Vilakkum (transl. Aladdin and the magical lamp) is a 1979 Indian fantasy film directed by I. V. Sasi, based on Aladdin's story from One Thousand and One Nights. The film stars Kamal Haasan, Rajinikanth, Jayabharathi and Sripriya, with Gemini Ganesan, Savitri and S. A. Ashokan in supporting roles. It was simultaneously filmed in Malayalam and Tamil languages, the latter as Allaudinaum Arputha Vilakkum (transl. Aladdin and the wonderful lamp). The Malayalam version was released on 14 April 1979, and the Tamil version two months later, on 8 June.

== Plot ==
Kamaruddin, the commander of the armed forces of Baghdad, has a desire for princess Roshni, the heiress to the kingdom, as her husband will rule the land after the Caliph's death. Roshni, however, loves street urchin Alavuddin, and he reciprocates. Alavuddin's childhood friend Jameela has one-sided feelings for him. Alavuddin and Kamaruddin fight a duel for winning over Roshni. Alavuddin triumphs, but his joy is short-lived as the courtier Mir Qasim, who wants Roshni for himself, kidnaps her and spirits her away. Alavuddin and Kamaruddin join forces and with help from a genie, rescue Roshni. On the way back, Kamaruddin is trapped in quicksand, but is rescued by Jameela and they unite.

== Cast ==
Character	Actors in Language	
Character	Malayalam	Tamil
Alavuddin	Kamal Haasan	Kamal Haasan
Kamaruddin	Rajinikanth	Rajinikanth
Princess Roshni	Jayabharathi	Jayabharathi
Jameela	Sripriya	Sripriya
The genie	S. A. Ashokan	S. A. Ashokan
Grand Sorcerer	Jose Prakash	R. S. Manohar
Fathima	Meena Joseph	Savitri
Abdulla	T. P. Madhavan	T. K. Bagavathi
Sainaba	Lalithasree	Lalithasree
Aboobakkar	Jose	Jose
Aboobakkar's father	Sankaradi	V. S. Raghavan
Ayishaumma	Sukumari	Sukumari
King of Baghdad	Thikkurissy Sukumaran Nair	P. S. Veerappa
Commander Mir Qasim	Gemini Ganesan	Gemini Ganesan
Minister Muhammed Hussain	Adoor Bhasi	V. K. Ramasamy
Royal Priest Hakkim Moulavi Sahib	Bahadoor	S. V. Sahasranamam
Fasul Jamal	Ravikumar	Ravikumar
Kunal	Sreelatha Namboothiri	Sreelatha Namboothiri
Yusaf, Arm fighter with Alavuddin	Cochin Haneefa	Cochin Haneefa
Cabaret dancers	Helen	Helen
Cabaret dancers	Bindu	Bindu
Cabaret dancers	Jayshree T.	Jayshree T.

== Production ==
Allauddinum Albhutha Vilakkum, directed by I. V. Sasi, was based on the story of Aladdin from One Thousand and One Nights, and had Kamal Haasan playing the title character, named Alavuddin here. Rajinikanth was cast as Kamaruddin, a character not present in the original story but created for the film. It was his first film in the Malayalam language and the fantasy genre. The film was simultaneously shot in Tamil as Allaudinaum Arputha Vilakkum, marking Sasi's directorial debut in Tamil cinema. This version was the second Tamil adaptation of the story of Aladdin, after a 1957 film. Ramachandra Babu worked as cinematographer, and the film was made in CinemaScope. According to him, Rajinikanth would often turn violent on the sets: "[He] was always under the influence of liquor and could turn violent any moment. Even Kamal was wary of doing fight sequences with [him]". Allauddinum Albhutha Vilakkum was to have been the first Malayalam CinemaScope film, but production delays led to Thacholi Ambu (1978) earning that distinction.

== Soundtrack ==
The soundtrack of both versions was composed by G. Devarajan. The lyrics for the Malayalam version were written by Yusufali Kechery, while the lyrics for the Tamil version were written by Vaali and Kannadasan.

Malayalam version
No.	Title	Singer(s)	Length
1.	"Ee Alavudheenin"	K. J. Yesudas	4:45
2.	"Pushpame"	Vani Jairam	4:28
3.	"Chandanam Kadanjedutha"	P. Madhuri	4:11
4.	"Sringara Ponkinnam"	Vani Jairam	4:35
5.	"Maran Korutha Maala"	K. J. Yesudas	4:36
6.	"Madhurangikale"	P. Susheela	4:17

Tamil version
No.	Title	Lyrics	Singer(s)	Length
1.	"Intha Alavudeenin Aasai"	Vaali	S. P. Balasubrahmanyam
2.	"Santhanam Kadainjedutha"	Kannadasan	P. Madhuri
3.	"Pushpame Sivanthu"	Kannadasan	Vani Jairam
4.	"Kalaivanigale"	Vaali	P.Susheela

== Release and reception ==
Allauddinum Albhutha Vilakkum was released on 14 April 1979, and Allaudinaum Arputha Vilakkum on 8 June 1979. The film performed well at the box office for the first two weeks, but slumped in the third. Reviewing the Tamil version for Kalki, Kausikan panned the film for completely ruining the story of Aladdin and also panned the poor casting choices and clownish portrayal of the genie. He added that Gemini Ganesan was underutilised and felt Rajinikanth's character was added just for fights while calling the story and dialogues as poor.

== Bibliography ==
- Ramachandran, Naman (2014) [2012]. Rajinikanth: The Definitive Biography (2nd ed.). New Delhi: Penguin Books. ISBN 978-81-8475-796-5.
