= Orikkal Koodi =

1981 Indian Malayalam-language film

- Directed by: I. V. Sasi
- Written by: Vilasini
- Screenplay by: Vilasini
- Produced by: S. R. Shaji
- Starring: Madhu; Sukumaran; Kaviyoor Ponnamma; Lakshmi
- Cinematography: C. E. Babu; Chandramohan
- Edited by: K. Narayanan
- Production company: SR Productions
- Distributed by: SR Productions
- Release date: 30 January 1981
- Country: India
- Language: Malayalam

Orikkal Koodi is a 1981 Indian Malayalam-language film, directed by I. V. Sasi and produced by S. R. Shaji. The film stars Madhu, Sukumaran, Kaviyoor Ponnamma and Lakshmi in the lead roles. background music was by Shyam.

== Cast ==
- Lakshmi as Devi Das
- Madhu as Chandran
- Sukumari as Mrs.Thampy
- Kaviyoor Ponnamma
- Sankaradi
- Sreelatha Namboothiri
- Sukumaran as Somanathan
- Baby Priya
- G. K. Pillai
- Kunchan
- Kuttyedathi Vilasini
- Paravoor Bharathan
- Prathima
- Ravi Menon as Vasavan
- Ravikumar
- Renuchandra

== Plot ==
Ramachandran Madhu takes charge as the MD of the company where Devi Lakshmi works as a stenographer. Devi is a hardworking single woman. Ramachandran on the other hand is a bachelor who refuses to marry due to a mishap earlier in his life. The prospective bride of Ramachandran had eloped with her lover on the day before the wedding and Ramachandran still has not been able to get over that traumatic memory. Ramachandran starts to develop feelings for Devi and Devi also reciprocates the same. Devi's daughter, a third grader and Ramachandran also have a very close bonding. However, one day when Ramachandran visits Devi, he accidentally finds out that Devi is the same girl who he was supposed to marry but had eloped. Heartbroken, Ramachandran behaves in a very cold manner to Devi. Devi could not bear the neglect. Ramachandran shares his problems with his friend Soman Sukumaran and then he tells his mother his wish to marry Devi. His mother Kaviyoor Ponnamma agrees to the marriage but shares her doubts whether Devi would be hesitant. Ramachandran in an office tour opens up to Devi about his feelings and Devi opens up about her past. However Ramachandran does not let Devi know that he was Devi's prospective bride-groom once. Devi learns about it from his mother and decides not to marry him. However, in the end true love wins; Devi and Ramachandran unite.
