= Ithaa Oru Manushyan =

- Directed by: I. V. Sasi
- Written by: Sreekumaran Thampi
- Screenplay by: Sreekumaran Thampi
- Starring: Madhu; Jayan; Sheela; Jayabharathi; KP Ummer
- Cinematography: C. Ramachandra Menon
- Edited by: K. Narayanan
- Music by: M. S. Viswanathan
- Production company: Hemnag Productions
- Distributed by: Hemnag Productions
- Release date: 5 May 1978
- Country: India
- Language: Malayalam

Ithaa Oru Manushyan is a 1978 Indian Malayalam film, directed by I. V. Sasi. The film stars Madhu, KP Ummer, Jayan, Sheela and Jayabharathi in the lead roles. The film has musical score by M. S. Viswanathan. The film is a remake of the Bengali film Amanush (1974).

== Cast ==
- Madhu as Madhusoodhanan Thampi "Madhu"
- K. P. Ummer as police inspector
- Jayan
- Sheela as Radha
- Jayabharathi
- Bahadoor
- Kanakadurga as Jaanu
- Kuthiravattam Pappu
- Poojappura Ravi as Kuttan Pilla, a police constable
- Adoor Bhasi
- Manjeri Chandran

== Soundtrack ==
The music was composed by M. S. Viswanathan with lyrics by Sreekumaran Thampi.

No.	Song	Singers	Lyrics	Length (m:ss)
1	"Mayiline Kandorikkal"	S. Janaki, P. Jayachandran	Sreekumaran Thampi	
2	"Nadiyile Thiramaalakal"	K. P. Brahmanandan	Sreekumaran Thampi	
3	"Om Kaali Mahaakaali"	L. R. Eeswari	Sreekumaran Thampi	
4	"Onnu Chirikkaan"	P. Jayachandran	Sreekumaran Thampi	
5	"Sharathkaalachandrika Vidaparanju"	S. Janaki	Sreekumaran Thampi	
6	"Vanchippaattukal"	M. S. Viswanathan	Sreekumaran Thampi	
