= Amarsham =

1978 film

- Directed by: I. V. Sasi
- Written by: Thoppil Bhasi
- Screenplay by: Thoppil Bhasi
- Produced by: A Raghunath
- Starring: Prem Nazir; Sheela; KPAC Lalitha; Jose Prakash
- Cinematography: Vipin Das
- Edited by: K. Narayanan
- Music by: G. Devarajan
- Production company: Sanjay
- Distributed by: Sanjay
- Release date: 24 March 1978
- Country: India
- Language: Malayalam

Amarsham is a 1978 Indian Malayalam film directed by I. V. Sasi and produced by A. Raghunath. The film stars Prem Nazir, Sheela, KPAC Lalitha and Jose Prakash in the lead roles. The film has musical score by G. Devarajan.

== Cast ==
- Prem Nazir
- Sheela
- KPAC Lalitha
- Jose Prakash
- Bahadoor
- Kunchan
- Kuthiravattam Pappu
- Ravikumar
- Vidhubala

== Plot ==
Sheela is the daughter of Jose Prakash, a police officer. Sheela is traveling in a bus when someone steals money from her bag. Upon Sheela's complaint, the police arrest Nazir on suspicion as he was standing nearby. Later his innocence is proved. Then Nazir and Sheela fall in love but their marriage is hindered. Sheela has to marry someone else. Ravikumar was the lover of Nazir's sister Vidhubala. Ravikumar impregnates Vidhubala but later ditches her and marries someone else. A cheated widow kills herself. Nazir kills Ravikumar who is vengeful. Later it is revealed that Ravikumar was married to Sheela and killed Sheela's husband. The court sentences Nazir to life imprisonment. The movie starts with Sheila picking up the middle-aged Nazir in a car, who is leaving prison after serving his sentence. The film shows their memories as flashbacks as they travel in the car.

== Soundtrack ==
The music was composed by G. Devarajan and the lyrics were written by Chirayinkeezhu Ramakrishnan Nair.

No.	Song	Singers	Lyrics	Length (m:ss)
1	"Malore Malore"	P. Susheela	Chirayinkeezhu Ramakrishnan Nair	
2	"Othupidichal Malayum Porum"	P. Jayachandran, Chorus, Karthikeyan	Chirayinkeezhu Ramakrishnan Nair	
3	"Pavizhamalli Ninte"	P. Jayachandran, P. Madhuri	Chirayinkeezhu Ramakrishnan Nair	
4	"Vaathil Thurakkoo"	K. J. Yesudas	Chirayinkeezhu Ramakrishnan Nair	
