= Aval Kanda Lokam =

1978 film

- Directed by: M. Krishnan Nair (director)
- Written by: Sheriff
- Produced by: Sheriff
- Starring: Jayan; K. P Ummer; Ravikumar; Praveena; Seema
- Music by: M. K. Arjunan
- Production company: Cheru Pushpam Films
- Distributed by: Cherupushpam films
- Release date: 27 June 1978
- Country: India
- Language: Malayalam

Aval Kanda Lokam is a 1978 Indian Malayalam film, directed by M. Krishnan Nair (director) and produced by Sheriff. The film stars Jayan, K. P Ummer, Ravikumar, Seema and Padmapriya in the lead roles. The film has musical score by M. K. Arjunan.

Raji is a doctor who sacrifices her love for her family friend Vinodh, after she realises that he is in love with Bindhu. When Bindhu suffers from psychogenic hysteria, Vinodh has some doubts about her. Raji's father asks Bindhu's mother about her future, and she tells him about her shattered experiences.

== Cast ==
- Jayan as Vinodh
- K. P Ummer as DR. Gopinath
- Ravikumar as Ramesh
- Cochin Haneefa
- Seema
- Vijayalalitha
- Praveena
- Sukumari
- Paravoor Bharathan

== Soundtrack ==
The music was composed by M. K. Arjunan and the lyrics were written by Sreekumaran Thampi.

No.	Song	Singers	Lyrics	Length (m:ss)
1	"Chandhanagandhikal"	K. J Yesudas	Sreekumaran Thampi	
2	"Hemantham Thozhuthunarum"	K. J. Yesudas chorus	Sreekumaran Thampi	
3	"Nimishadalangal nirvruthi kollum"	K. J Yesudas	Sreekumaran Thampi	
4	"Thushara Bindhukkale"	S. Janaki	Sreekumaran Thampi	
