= Avalude Ravukal =

1978 film

- Directed by: I. V. Sasi
- Written by: A. Sheriff
- Based on: Avalude Ravukal Pakalukal by A. Sheriff
- Produced by: M. P. Ramachandran
- Starring: Seema; Ravikumar; M. G. Soman; Sukumaran
- Cinematography: RamachandraBabu
- Edited by: K. Narayanan
- Music by: A. T. Ummer
- Production company: Murali Movies
- Distributed by: Sithara Pictures
- Release date: 3 March 1978
- Running time: 144 minutes
- Country: India
- Language: Malayalam

Avalude Ravukal (transl. Her Nights) is a 1978 Indian Malayalam-language drama film directed by I. V. Sasi and written by A. Sheriff. The film explores the life of Raji (Seema), a teenage prostitute, and those of the people around her. Upon its release, the film received less audience during the first three days, but then became one of the year's highest-grossing films. The plot follows a sex worker who has not only been unapologetic about what she does but also considers herself deserving of love and dignity irrespective of what she does for a living.

It is considered one of the boldest Malayalam films of all time. At that time, Sasi, an experimental yet highly popular director, tried to highlight a theme which most mainstream directors were afraid to get into. Kamal Haasan and I. V. Sasi made guest appearances in the film. It was dubbed and released in Tamil as Avalin Iravugal and in Hindi as Her Nights, both of which achieved box office success. Additionally, it was remade in Kannada as Kamala (1979) and in Hindi as Patita (1980).

== Plot ==
The story pivots around Raji, a young prostitute, and three young men in her life: Two college-going youngsters, Babu and Jayan, and a school teacher, Chandran.

After losing her parents at an early age, she is saddled with the responsibility of bringing up her younger brother, Sudhakaran. Circumstances and her unskilled status force her into prostitution. She begins living in a slum with Mariyaamma Chedathi and a cycle-rickshaw driver Damu, her 'agent' or pimp.

Babu is a student who stays in a nearby hostel. Raji falls for Babu and becomes a regular visitor at his flat. Despite her frequent visits, Babu, concerned for his reputation, repeatedly tries to throw her out. Raji declares her love for Babu but says that she does not want to have sexual relations with him, as that would make him just another customer. However, she cajoles him into letting her sleep at his place on the floor, gently refusing his romantic overtures. News spreads about Babu's relationship with Raji, and it is mistakenly assumed to be that of a customer and prostitute.

Raji's brother, Sudhakaran, has a teacher-student relationship with Chandran. One day, a beggar steals Chandran's wristwatch through an open window. Sudhakaran is arrested by the police because he is a regular visitor to Chandran's room and becomes the main suspect. He is beaten up by the cops while in custody and dies from the physical trauma after his release. The real thief is later arrested; Chandran is guilt-ridden that his hasty judgement resulted in the boy's death. Out of remorse, he offers money to Raji, but she refuses to accept it or forgive him in any manner.

Babu's father, Karunakaran, decides to have his son marry his wife Lakshmi's brother's daughter, Damodaran's daughter Radha. Karunakaran, Damodaran, and Radha visit Babu's hostel room and are shocked to see Raji in there, who, as usual, was just there to talk to Babu and be with him. They assume that the two are sleeping together. Damodaran breaks off the engagement and has Radha marry another man.

Jayan, who had had a severe drinking problem, dies of liver-related complications. On his deathbed he asks Babu not to abandon Raji and emphasises it with the justification that her love for him is pure, even if it's 'impure' in the eyes of society. Raji is gang-raped and Chandran's timely intervention saves her; Raji then finally begins to forgive Chandran.

Babu's mother believes her son's denials of impropriety with Raji and comes to meet Babu and eventually Raji. She takes pity on Raji when she learns of her past and her son's blind love for her. Lakshmi accepts her as her daughter-in-law and takes her home, and eventually Babu's father is also forced to accept Raji as his daughter-in-law.

== Cast ==
"Many of the leading ladies of the day were not bold enough to play the role of a prostitute. Then I thought of Seema, who had caught my attention as a dancer while shooting Itha Ivide Vare."

— I. V. Sasi about the casting of Seema. Avalude Ravukal was Seema's first lead role and she went on to associate with Sasi in 30 more films. They got married later.
- Seema as Raji
- Ravikumar as Babu
- M. G. Soman as Chandran
- Sukumaran as Jayan
- Bahadoor as Karunakaran
- Sankaradi as Damodaran
- Kaviyoor Ponnamma as Lakshmi
- Usharani as Radha
- Kuthiravattam Pappu as Damu
- Meena as Mariyaamma Chedathi
- Master Raghu as Sudhakaran
- Sathaar as Sudheeran, a Police Inspector
- Kamal Haasan (guest appearance)
- I. V. Sasi (guest appearance)

== Production ==
The film was produced by M. P. Ramachandran under the banner of Murali Movies. The film story, script and dialogues were written by A. Sheriff. Vipindas was the man behind the camera and K. Narayanan edited the film. This film was shot in black-and-white. The final length of the film was 4,134.61 metres (13,565.0 ft).

== Soundtrack ==
The music was composed by A. T. Ummer and the lyrics were written by Bichu Thirumala. Guna Singh composed the background score. Music for the song "Raagendu Kiranangal" was allegedly copied from the song "Pal Bhar Mein Yeh Kya Ho" in the film Swami released in 1977.

No.	Song	Singers
1	"Antharindriya Daahangal"	K. J. Yesudas
2	"Raagendu Kiranangal"	S. Janaki
3	"Unni Aarariro"	S. Janaki

== Release and reception ==
Avalude Ravukal was released on 3 March 1978. It was given an "A" (adult) certificate by the Central Board of Film Certification. The film was distributed by S. Pavamani under the banner of Sithara Pictures. The film was dubbed and released in Tamil as Avalin Iravugal and in Hindi as Her Nights and was also successful at the box office. Avalude Ravukal was remade in Hindi as Patita (1980), also directed by I. V. Sasi. Over the years, the film has developed into a cult film. B. Vijayakumar of The Hindu wrote that the film was "Remembered for the social movie with a strong message and good music". It is also considered to be one of the first movies to root for the origin of Malayalam soft porn films during the next several years, that influxed the industry.
