= Lakshmana Rekha (film) =

- Poster
- Directed by: I. V. Sasi
- Written by: P. V. Kuriakkose
- Produced by: M. P. Ramachandran
- Starring: Mohanlal; Mammootty; Seema
- Cinematography: Jayanan Vincent
- Edited by: K. Narayanan
- Music by: A. T. Ummer; Shyam (score)
- Production company: Murali Movies
- Distributed by: Munod-Vijaya Release
- Release date: 1 June 1984
- Country: India
- Language: Malayalam

Lakshmana Rekha (transl. The line of Lakshmana) is a 1984 Indian Malayalam-language drama film directed by I. V. Sasi, written by P. V. Kuriakkose, and produced by M. P. Ramachandran. The film stars Mohanlal, Mammootty, and Seema in lead roles. The film is a melodrama exploiting the Kerala convention of marriage between cousins. The film features songs composed by A. T. Ummer and background score by Shyam.

== Plot ==
Retired colonel Rajasekharan has two sons—Sukumaran and Sudhakaran and a daughter, Sunitha. Sukumaran, a police officer, is married to their cousin Radha. In the initial days, they abstain from having sexual intercourse as Radha is going through her menstruation period. In the fifth day of their marriage, when they had decided to participate in their first sexual intercourse, Sukumaran meets with an accident and is paralyzed for life. Radha now looks after a bedridden Sukumaran.

While Radha and Sukumaran's life ended in misery, Sudhakaran's life is going well. He is appointed as the new general manager of a corporate company. Sudhakaran sympathizes with Radha. Meanwhile, Radha has frequent headaches. Their family doctor conducts several tests on her, but reveals nothing. For a second opinion, Sudhakaran and Radha go to a hospital to consult a neurologist, again the tests show nothing. The doctor theorizes that such headaches can also cause due to sexual frustration and it could likely be the case here considering her situation.

That night, Sudhakaran and Radha are sharing a double room in a hotel as two separate rooms were unavailable. While Radha is sleeping, Sudhakaran rapes her; at first she resists but then she is submissive. They both perform intercourse. The next morning, Sudhakaran reveals her that he sexually approached her because of what the doctor said as Sukumaran is helpless. It shows result: Radha is relieved from her frequent headaches in the coming days.

Eventually, Radha gets pregnant, the family is shocked. Sudhakaran reveals it is his child but still hides what the doctor said. Rajasekharan condemns his son. Sudhakaran is willing to marry her. Finally, the family decides to get her married to Sudhakaran without informing Sukumaran. But Radha tells him everything. Unable to handle this new development, he loses his ability to speak. That night Sukumaran is killed by overdose of sleeping pills. Sudhakaran and Sunitha suspect Radha, while Radha suspects Sudhakaran. Breaking the suspense, Rajasekharan reveals that he killed his tormented son to end his misery. He calls the police and gets himself arrested.

== Cast ==
- Mohanlal as Sudhakaran
- Mammootty as Sukumaran
- Seema as Radha
- K. P. Ummer as Colonel Rajasekharan
- Kalaranjini as Sunitha
- P. K. Abraham as Dr. Mathews
- Adoor Bhasi as Radha's father
- Kaviyoor Ponnamma as Radha's mother
- Janardhanan as Balachandra Menon
- Sumithra as Vilasini

== Soundtrack ==
The music was composed by A. T. Ummer and the lyrics were written by Bichu Thirumala.

| No. | Song | Singers | Lyrics | Length |
|---|---|---|---|---|
| 1 | "Aaranyakaandathiloode" | K. J. Yesudas | Bichu Thirumala | |
| 2 | "Enno Engengo" | S. Janaki | Bichu Thirumala | |
| 3 | "Manassinte Manchalil" | K. J. Yesudas | Bichu Thirumala | |
| 4 | "Manassinte Manchalil" (Pathos) | K. J. Yesudas | Bichu Thirumala | |
| 5 | "Oru Suprabhaathathin" | K. J. Yesudas, Sujatha Mohan | Bichu Thirumala | |
