= Aaroodam =

- Directed by: I. V. Sasi
- Screenplay by: M. T. Vasudevan Nair
- Produced by: Rosamma George
- Starring: Nedumudi Venu; Lakshmi; Seema; Adoor Bhasi
- Cinematography: Jayanan Vincent
- Edited by: K. Narayanan
- Music by: Shyam
- Production company: JMJ Arts
- Distributed by: JMJ Arts
- Release date: 8 July 1983
- Country: India
- Language: Malayalam

Aaroodam is a 1983 Indian Malayalam film, directed by I. V. Sasi and produced by Rosamma George. The film stars Nedumudi Venu, Lakshmi, Seema and Adoor Bhasi in prominent roles. The film has musical score by Shyam. The film won the Nargis Dutt Award for Best Feature Film on National Integration in 1983.

== Plot ==
Das returns to his native village in Kerala with his wife Seetha and son Rajesh, leaving behind his high-profile Job in Bombay, much to the dislike of his wife who is used to the conveniences and luxuries of the city. She keeps cribbing about the difficulties of village life and the lack of basic amenities and facilities there. Das quit his job due to the high pressure and tension it gave him because of his ideological stands, something about which he opens to Gopalan Nair, their house manager in his youth. He selected this village house as his share of property after partition, rejecting another house at Cochin, which further upsets Seetha. Seetha is doubtful of Das since she had heard of some affair and close relationships with women in his extended family when he was growing up in the village. Das's old flame Neeli who belongs to the lower caste stays in a hut in front of their property as traditional tenants, as was the practice in olden times. Rajesh / Unni gets a liking to her and often goes in secret to her place to see her and play. He also gets close with Neeli's niece, another low caste girl. Seetha is angry at her presence around them and always fights with Das for the same. She successfully gets her evicted from their premises after much deliberation with Das and Gopalan Nair. She also gets Das to arrange admission for Unni in a Yercaud-based convent school since she is skeptical about the schooling in the village.

Neeli is suffering from some chronic ailment which gets her tired and breathless most of the time. Her father wants to consult a doctor for her instead of the traditional medicine and tries to get a loan from Das by pledging his meagre share of some gold. Seetha refuses to take any gold and tells Das to help them out otherwise with cash if he wants. One day Unni goes to her new hut nearby the river to see her since she was seriously ill. When he was playing closely with Neeli's niece, she rebukes them and shouts at her niece to go away. She then breaks down in front of Unni saying that its better for them not to meet, instead of getting close at a young age and moving apart once they are adults, reminiscing of her own childhood and subsequent affair with Das. When Unni is back home, Das scolds and trashes him for visiting Neeli since he knows Seetha will keep doubting him and creating problems in the family. Both Das and Seetha have an emotional talk that night and they finally reconcile after Das assures her that even if he has had his share of affairs in the past, he has always been faithful to her since he decided to marry her. He consoles Unni saying that people like them and Neeli were kept apart due to the untouchability and other caste practices in those times. The next morning, they get to know that Neeli had died the previous night due to her fatal condition. Unni visits the place where she was cremated, joined by Das later and is watched far way from Seetha who breaks down.

== Cast ==
- Nedumudi Venu as Das
- Lakshmi as Seetha
- Seema as Neeli
- Adoor Bhasi as Gopalan Nair
- Sankaradi as Thampuran
- Master Vimal as Unni /Rajesh
- Meena as Devaki
- Santhakumari as Naaniyamma
- Thodupuzha Vasanthy as Thampuratty
- Sabitha Anand as Malootty
- Tony as Malootty's lover
- Sonia as Paru

== Soundtrack ==
The music was composed by Shyam and the lyrics were written by Kavalam Narayana Panicker.

No.	Song	Singers	Lyrics	Length (m:ss)
1	"Ezhara Veluppam"	Kavalam Sreekumar	Kavalam Narayana Panicker	
2	"Kaathirippoo Kunjarippoovu"	S. Janaki	Kavalam Narayana Panicker	
3	"Oorukaani Malavazhiye"	K. J. Yesudas, Kavalam Sreekumar, Latha Raju	Kavalam Narayana Panicker	
4	"Paathiraamanalilu"	Kavalam Sreekumar	Kavalam Narayana Panicker	
5	"Thanka Thanki Thaithaaro"	Kavalam Sreekumar, Krishnachandran	Kavalam Narayana Panicker	

== Awards ==
The film won the Kerala State Film Award for Best Story.
