= Innale Innu =

- Directed by: I. V. Sasi
- Written by: A. Sheriff
- Screenplay by: A. Sheriff
- Produced by: Thiruppathi Chettiyar
- Starring: Prem Nazir; Sheela; Kaviyoor Ponnamma; Jose Prakash
- Cinematography: C. Ramachandran
- Edited by: K. Narayanan
- Music by: G. Devarajan; Lyrics: Bichu Thirumala
- Production company: Evershine Productions
- Distributed by: Evershine Productions
- Release date: 25 November 1977
- Country: India
- Language: Malayalam

Innale Innu (trans: "Yesterday [and] Today") is a 1977 Indian Malayalam-language film directed by I. V. Sasi and produced by Thiruppathi Chettiyar. The film stars Prem Nazir, Sheela, Kaviyoor Ponnamma and Jose Prakash in the lead roles. The film has musical score by G. Devarajan.

== Cast ==
- Prem Nazir as Gopi
- Sheela as Thulasi
- M. G. Soman as Thulasi's husband
- Sukumaran
- Ravikumar as Rajan
- Vidhubala as Radha
- Meena
- Kaviyoor Ponnamma as Radha's Mother
- Jose Prakash as Achutha Kuruppu (Thulasi's father)
- Sankaradi as Nanu Nair
- Sreelatha Namboothiri
- Bahadoor as Rajan's father
- Janardanan as Chadran
- Kuthiravattam Pappu

== Soundtrack ==
The music was composed by G. Devarajan and the lyrics were written by Bichu Thirumala and Chirayinkeezhu Ramakrishnan Nair. The song "Chembakam Poothulanja" is written by Bichu Thirumala only.

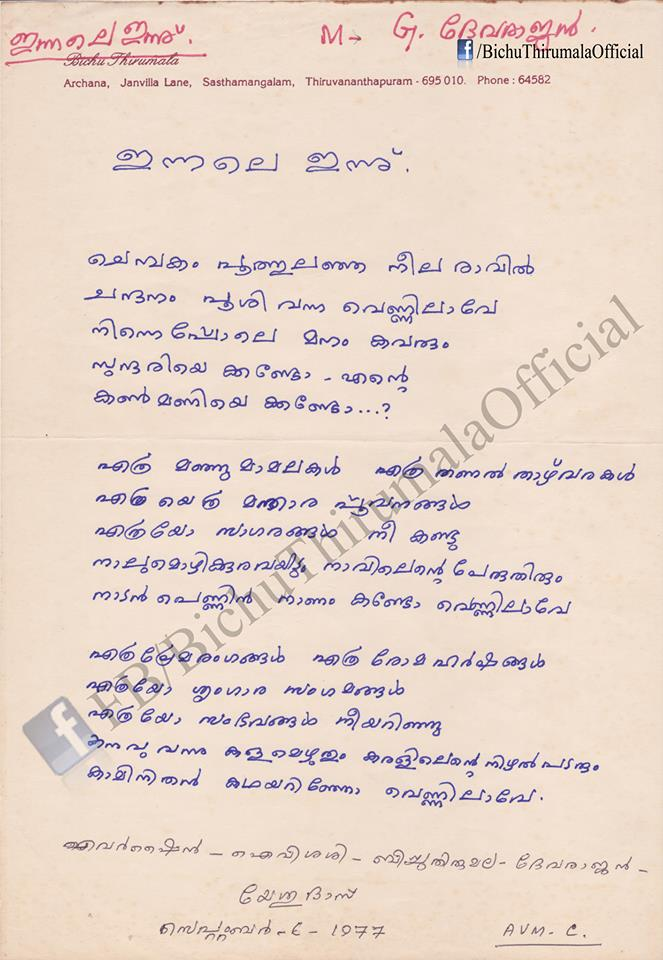
"Chembakam Poothulanja" - Original Handwritten Copy of Bichu Thirumala

No.	Song	Singers	Lyrics	Length (m:ss)
1	"Chembakam Poothulanja"	K. J. Yesudas	Bichu Thirumala	
2	"Ilam Poove"	P. Madhuri	Bichu Thirumala	
3	"Pranayasarovara Theeram"	K. J. Yesudas	Bichu Thirumala	
4	"Swarna Yavanikaykkullile"	K. J. Yesudas	Chirayinkeezhu Ramakrishnan Nair	
