= Aarundivide Chodikkan =

1986 film directed by Manoj Babu

- Directed by: Manoj Babu
- Starring: Beeman Reghu
- Cinematography: B. R. Ramakrishna
- Edited by: K. Narayanan
- Music by: A. T. Ummer
- Production company: Rajath Productions
- Distributed by: Rajath Productions
- Release date: 12 January 1986
- Country: India
- Language: Malayalam

Aarundivide Chodikkan is a 1986 Indian Malayalam film, directed by Manoj Babu. The film has musical score by A. T. Ummer.

== Soundtrack ==
The music was composed by A. T. Ummer and the lyrics were written by Poovachal Khader.

No.	Song	Singers	Lyrics	Length (m:ss)
1	"Mazhayulla Raavil"	K. S. Chithra	Poovachal Khader	
2	"Oru Naanam Viriyumpol"	K. S. Chithra	Poovachal Khader	
