= Malsaram =

- Directed by: K. Narayanan
- Written by: M. G. Mathew; Sherif (dialogues)
- Screenplay by: Sherif
- Starring: Raghavan; Mancheri Chandran; MG Soman; Rani Chandra
- Edited by: K. Narayanan
- Music by: M. K. Arjunan
- Production company: Juliot Production
- Release date: 14 February 1975
- Country: India
- Language: Malayalam

Malsaram is a 1975 Indian Malayalam film, directed by K. Narayanan. The film stars Raghavan, Mancheri Chandran, M. G. Soman and Rani Chandra in the lead roles. The film has musical score by M. K. Arjunan.

== Cast ==
- Raghavan
- Mancheri Chandran
- M. G. Soman
- Rani Chandra
- Sakunthala
- Sujatha
- Vijayaraghavan
- Vincent

== Soundtrack ==
The music was composed by M. K. Arjunan. All lyrics written by P. Bhaskaran

No.	Song	Singers	Lyrics	Length (m:ss)
1	"Chirichukondekayaaya"	K. J. Yesudas, P. Madhuri	P. Bhaskaran	
2	"Kanmunayaal Sharameyyum"	L. R. Eswari	P. Bhaskaran	
3	"Paathiraavaam"	K. J. Yesudas	P. Bhaskaran	
4	"Venthinkalinnoru Manavaatti"	K. J. Yesudas	P. Bhaskaran	
