= Ina (film) =

- VCD Cover
- Directed by: I. V. Sasi
- Written by: John Paul
- Produced by: Ramachandran
- Starring: Master Raghu; Devi; Kanchana; Rasheed; B. K. Pottekkadu
- Cinematography: Jayanan Vincent
- Edited by: K. Narayanan
- Music by: Songs: A. T. Ummer; Background score: Shyam; Lyrics: Bichu Thirumala
- Production company: Murali Movies
- Distributed by: Raj Pictures
- Release date: September 1, 1982 (India)
- Running time: 128 minutes
- Country: India
- Language: Malayalam

Ina is a 1982 Indian Malayalam-language romantic drama film directed by I. V. Sasi. The film explores teen lust, child marriage and the consequences. It stars Master Raghu and Devi, while Kanchana, Rasheed and B. K. Pottekkadu play major supporting roles. The film received strongly positive reviews upon release. It was a bold attempt in Malayalam cinema, and is regarded as a cult film.

The film's basic story is inspired from the 1980 film The Blue Lagoon.

== Synopsis ==
Vinod and Anitha are classmates in school and have their own personal problems. Vinod's stepmother wants to seduce him, and Anitha is an illegitimate child that her mother never wanted. On a rainy day, they take shelter in a train wagon, which starts moving before they could get out and stops next in a forested area a long way from home. There, they find a couple of recluses – a widow and an ex-army officer – living their own lives and willing to accept them.

As they were in early puberty, they live like normal children. But as puberty stage starts, both experiences teen lust over each other. They can't resist each other and repeatedly have sex. The widow accepts them as foster children and perform their marriage, but fate intervenes as an incurable disease for Anitha forms rest of the story.

== Cast ==
- Master Raghu as Vinod a.k.a. Vinu
- Devi Bala as Anitha aka Anu
- Kanchana as Aunty
- B. K. Pottekkadu as Khader
- Ashapriya
- Varghese
- Master B. V. Krishnanand as Ratheesh, Ani's brother

== Soundtrack ==
The music was composed by A. T. Ummer and the lyrics were written by Bichu Thirumala.

No.	Song	Singers	Lyrics	Length (m:ss)
1	"Aralipoonkaadukal"	Krishnachandran	Bichu Thirumala	
2	"Kinaavinte Varambathu"	K. J. Yesudas; S. Janaki; Krishnachandran	Bichu Thirumala	
3	"Poovirinjilla"	S. Janaki; P. Jayachandran	Bichu Thirumala	
4	"Vellichillum Vithari"	Krishnachandran	Bichu Thirumala	

== Remake ==
The film was remade in November 2011 with newcomers Yuvan and Swathi playing the lead roles. It is written and directed by Mahesh Karanthoor.
