= Anumodhanam =

1978 film

- Theatrical release poster
- Directed by: I. V. Sasi
- Written by: Thoppil Bhasi
- Screenplay by: Thoppil Bhasi
- Produced by: Thayyil Kunjikandan
- Starring: Kamal Haasan; Vidhubala; Jayan; Sankaradi; Raghavan
- Cinematography: C. Ramachandra Menon
- Edited by: K. Narayanan
- Music by: A. T. Ummer
- Production company: Chelavoor Pictures
- Distributed by: Suguna Screen
- Release date: 24 February 1978
- Country: India
- Language: Malayalam

Anumodhanam is a 1978 Indian Malayalam-language film, directed by I. V. Sasi and produced by Thayyil Kunjikandan. The film stars Kamal Haasan, Vidhubala, Jayan, Sankaradi, Raghavan and Bahadoor. The musical score is by A. T. Ummer.

== Plot ==
The protagonist Rajappan is employed, but wants a job that makes use of his studies. He gets a job in a newspaper. He has a younger sister Sridevi whom he has Iooked after since the early death of their parents. Rajappan marries their neighbour Thankhamma. Vijayan and Sridevi are in love and Rajappan fixes their marriage. One day their manager's son James arrives in the press because of the manager's illness. He is a smuggler. His friend Raghavan is with him. One day Sridevi comes to eat with Rajappan. James sees her and likes her. Raghavan says that she is a poor girl and warns him not to follow her.

One day Rajappan, Vijayan and Thankhamma take the ornaments and saree for Sridevi's marriage. James tells his assistant to tell Sridevi's friend Ragini that Rajappan was arrested for drugs and to bring Sridevi to his house. Ragini tells her but she is afraid. James' assistant comes to Sridevi's house and tells her to talk to James because the police inspector is his friend. Sridevi goes with him to James who rapes her. Raghavan sees all this. Rajappan arrives with things for Sridevi, but she is unhappy and her face and lips are injured. Rajappan asks her what happened, but she does not tell him. On Sridevi's marriage day, no one can find her. Ragini says that Sridevi's body has been found at the seashore.

Rajappan wonders why she committed suicide. One day Vijayan comes to Sridevi's room and sees her letter that explains what happened. Raghavan says to James that this was because of you and that he will tell everyone about the rape. Raghavan tells Rajappan and Inspector Gopi. While Raghavan is searching for James, his assistants capture him. He kills Raghavan and throws his body into the sea. Rajappan finds him, but James wins and tries to kill him, Vijayan kills James from behind. He goes to the sea and sees Sridevi who tells him to join her and he commits suicide.

== Cast ==
- Kamal Haasan as Rajappan
- Vidhubala as Sridevi
- Sankaradi
- Raghavan
- Bahadoor
- M. G. Soman
- Jayan
- Seema

== Production ==
Anumodhanam was directed by I. V. Sasi and produced by Thayyil Kunjikandan for Chelavoor Pictures. This film was shot in black-and-white. It was given an "U" (Unrestricted) certificate by the Central Board of Film Certification. The final length of the film was 3,863.95 metres (12,677.0 ft).

== Soundtrack ==
The music was composed by A. T. Ummer with lyrics by Bharanikkavu Sivakumar.

No.	Song	Singers	Lyrics	Length (m:ss)
1	"Chiri Kondu"	K. J. Yesudas	Bharanikkavu Sivakumar	
2	"Kaappikal Pookkunna"	P. Jayachandran, Ambili, K. P. Brahmanandan, B. Vasantha	Bharanikkavu Sivakumar	
3	"Kizhakku Mazhavil"	K. J. Yesudas, Ambili	Bharanikkavu Sivakumar	
4	"Mullappoo"	Ambili, Chorus	Bharanikkavu Sivakumar	
