= Ayalkkaari =

- Promotional poster
- Directed by: I. V. Sasi
- Written by: Sherif
- Screenplay by: Sherif
- Produced by: A Raghunath
- Starring: Jayabharathi; MG Soman; Rani Chandra; Vincent
- Cinematography: U. Rajagopal
- Edited by: K. Narayanan
- Music by: G. Devarajan Lyrics= Sreekumaran Thampi
- Production company: Sanjay Productions
- Distributed by: Sanjay Productions
- Release date: 24 September 1976
- Country: India
- Language: Malayalam

Ayalkkaari is a 1976 Indian Malayalam-language film, directed by I. V. Sasi and produced by A. Raghunath. The film stars Jayabharathi, M. G. Soman, Rani Chandra and Vincent.

== Cast ==
- Jayabharathi as Geetha
- M. G. Soman
- Rani Chandra as Sathi
- Vincent as Raju
- Adoor Bhasi as Fernandez
- Manavalan Joseph as Kurup
- Prema
- Sankaradi
- Krishnan Munnadu
- M. O. Devasya
- Prathapachandran
- Bahadoor as Varghese
- E. Madhavan
- Janardanan as Mathew
- Meena as Flory
- Ravikumar as Mohanan
- Treesa
- Usharani as Elizabeth

== Soundtrack ==
The music was composed by G. Devarajan and the lyrics were written by Sreekumaran Thampi.

No.	Song	Singers	Lyrics	Length (m:ss)
1	"Ilanjippoomanam"	K. J. Yesudas	Sreekumaran Thampi	
2	"Onnaanaam Ankanathil"	P. Madhuri, Karthikeyan	Sreekumaran Thampi	
3	"Thattalle Muttalle"	C. O. Anto, Karthikeyan, Peter (Paramasivam)	Sreekumaran Thampi	
4	"Vasantham Ninnodu"	K. J. Yesudas	Sreekumaran Thampi	
