= Black Belt (1978 film) =

1978 film directed by Crossbelt Mani

- Directed by: Crossbelt Mani
- Starring: Vincent; Unnimary; Kavitha; Balan K. Nair; Kuthiravattam Pappu; Ravikumar; Sudheer
- Cinematography: E. N. Balakrishnan
- Edited by: Chakrapani
- Music by: Shyam
- Production company: Rose Movies
- Distributed by: Rose Movies
- Release date: 28 April 1978
- Country: India
- Language: Malayalam

Black Belt is a 1978 Indian Malayalam film, directed by Crossbelt Mani. The film stars Unnimary, Kavitha, Balan K. Nair, Kuthiravattam Pappu and Ravikumar in the lead roles. The film has musical score by Shyam.

== Cast ==
- Ravikumar
- Sudheer
- Vincent
- Unnimary
- Kavitha
- Balan K. Nair
- Kuthiravattam Pappu
- Vijayalalitha

== Soundtrack ==
The music was composed by Shyam and the lyrics were written by Bharanikkavu Sivakumar.

No.	Song	Singers	Lyrics	Length (m:ss)
1	"Maamala Vazhum"	S. Janaki, Vani Jairam, Chorus	Bharanikkavu Sivakumar	
2	"Maanodunna"	P. Jayachandran, Vani Jairam	Bharanikkavu Sivakumar	
3	"Maniveenayumaay"	P. Jayachandran	Bharanikkavu Sivakumar	
4	"Sringaaram"	P. Jayachandran, Chorus	Bharanikkavu Sivakumar	
