= Patita (1980 film) =

1980 Indian film by I. V. Sasi

- Poster
- Directed by: I. V. Sasi
- Produced by: Mukul Roy
- Starring: Mithun Chakraborty; Raj Kiran; Vikram; Shoma Anand
- Music by: Bappi Lahiri
- Release date: 5 December 1980
- Running time: 125 minutes
- Country: India
- Language: Hindi

Patita is a 1980 Indian Hindi-language film directed by I. V. Sasi. It stars Shoma Anand in the title role, with Mithun Chakraborty, Raj Kiran, Vikram in pivotal roles. The film was a remake of director's own Malayalam film Avalude Ravukal.

It is a remake of the Malayalam 1978 movie named Avalude Ravukal.

== Cast ==
- Mithun Chakraborty as Jain
- Raj Kiran as Ashok
- Vikram as Deepkamal
- Shoma Anand as Rajni
- Madan Puri as Jain's Father
- Sujit Kumar as Inspector Dilip
- Raj Mehra as Ashok's Father
- Sulochana Latkar as Ashok's Mother
- Ramesh Deo as Rajni's Father
- Seema Deo as Rajni's Mother
- Shammi as Maria
- Ram Sethi as Moti
- Mac Mohan

== Soundtrack ==
Song	Singer
"Is Zamane Mein Hai"	Lata Mangeshkar
"Baithe Baithe Aaj Aayi"	Lata Mangeshkar
"Sunte Sunte Yeh Meri Kahani"	Lata Mangeshkar
"Honthon Pe Jaan Chali Aayegi"	Kishore Kumar
"Dil Dhak Dhak Karne Laga"	Kishore Kumar
