= Madhurikkunna Raathri =

- Directed by: P. G. Vishwambharan
- Written by: Sreemoolanagaram Vijayan
- Screenplay by: Sreemoolanagaram Vijayan
- Starring: Ravikumar; Vincent; Aparna; Mala Aravindan
- Cinematography: Rangan
- Edited by: Balakrishnan
- Music by: M. S. Viswanathan
- Production company: Sreeganesh Kalamandir
- Distributed by: Sreeganesh Kalamandir
- Release date: 20 October 1978
- Country: India
- Language: Malayalam

Madhurikkunna Raathri is a 1978 Indian Malayalam-language film, directed by P. G. Vishwambharan. The film stars Ravikumar, Vincent, Aparna and Mala Aravindan. The film has musical score by M. S. Viswanathan.

== Cast ==
- Ravikumar
- Vincent
- Thikkurissy Sukumaran Nair
- P. K. Abraham
- Pattom Sadan
- Mala Aravindan
- Mamatha
- Aparna
- Meena

== Soundtrack ==
The music was composed by M. S. Viswanathan and the lyrics were written by Yusufali Kechery.

| No. | Song | Singers | Lyrics | Length (m:ss) |
|---|---|---|---|---|
| 1 | "Ding Dong" | P. Jayachandran | Yusufali Kechery | |
| 2 | "Kuliranu Deham" | P. Jayachandran | Yusufali Kechery | |
| 3 | "Rajani Hemantharajani" | P. Susheela, P. Jayachandran | Yusufali Kechery | |
| 4 | "Vishwamohini" | Jolly Abraham | Yusufali Kechery | |
