= Midhya =

- Directed by: I. V. Sasi
- Written by: M. T. Vasudevan Nair
- Produced by: Seema
- Starring: Mammootty; Suresh Gopi; Rupini; M. G. Soman; Sukumari; Balan K. Nair; Bheeman Raghu
- Cinematography: Santhosh Sivan
- Edited by: K. Narayanan
- Music by: Shyam
- Release date: 1991
- Country: India
- Language: Malayalam

Midhya is a 1991 Malayalam-language film. Directed by I. V. Sasi, based on the script by M. T. Vasudevan Nair, this film stars Mammootty, Suresh Gopi, Rupini, Sukumari and M. G. Soman.

== Plot ==
Venugopal, a rich young businessman, still considers Shivan as his mentor. Shivan had helped him in his early days in Mumbai. At the time of his death, Shivan had asked Venu to take care of his younger brother Rajashekharan, which Venu obeyed wholeheartedly. Rajan was appointed as his manager and is treated more like his brother. On a visit to Rajan's house along with him, Venu meets Devi. Venu expresses Rajan's sister about his wish to marry Devi, but changes his mind after realizing that she is already engaged to Rajan. Venu wholeheartedly gets Rajan married to Devi. Rajan, in thirst to earn quick money, gets into bad company and severs ties with Venu. He becomes suspicious of his wife having an illicit relation with Venu. Slowly turning to too much drinking and gambling, Rajan falls into huge debts; to make things worse, he also becomes involved with smuggling. Venu's efforts to save Rajan from his problems and bring him back to normal life is the rest of the story.

== Cast ==
- Mammootty as Venugopal
- Suresh Gopi as K. P. Rajagopal
- Rupini as Devi
- Jagannatha Varma as Krishna Kurup
- Balan K. Nair as Narayanan
- M. G. Soman as Appunni
- K. P. Ummer as Nambyar
- Bheeman Raghu as Varghese
- Kuthiravattam Pappu as Ezhuthachan
- Thikkurissy Sukumaran Nair as Muthachan
- Kaviyoor Ponnamma as Rajagopal's Mother
- Sukumari as Ammalu
- Manimala
- Sonia
