= Aasheervaadam =

- LP Vinyl Records Cover
- Directed by: I. V. Sasi
- Written by: Alleppey Sheriff
- Screenplay by: Alleppey Sheriff
- Produced by: Thayyil Kunjikandan
- Starring: Kamal Haasan; Sridevi; Sheela; K. P. Ummer; Jayan; Bahadoor
- Cinematography: C. Ramachandra Menon
- Edited by: K. Narayanan
- Music by: M. K. Arjunan
- Production company: Chelavoor Pictures
- Distributed by: Chelavoor Pictures
- Release date: 10 February 1977
- Country: India
- Language: Malayalam

Aasheervaadam is a 1977 Indian Malayalam-language film, directed by I. V. Sasi and produced by Thayyil Kunjikandan. Written by Alleppey Sheriff, the film stars Kamal Haasan, Sridevi, Sheela, K. P. Ummer and Bahadoor.

== Cast ==
- Kamal Haasan(Dubbed by Chandramohan)
- Sridevi(Dubbed by Lissi)
- Sheela
- Bahadoor
- K. P. Ummer
- M. G. Soman
- Jayan
- Vidhubala
- Ravikumar

== Soundtrack ==
Aasheervaadam

Film score by M. K. Arjunan
- Released: 1977
- Recorded: 1977
- Genre: Feature film soundtrack
- Label: EMI

The music was composed by M. K. Arjunan and the lyrics were written by Bharanikkavu Sivakumar.

Songs
No.	Title	Lyrics	Singer(s)	Length
1.	"Aayiravallithan"	Bharanikkavu Sivakumar	K. J. Yesudas
2.	"Seemantharekhayil Chandanamchaarthiya"	Bharanikkavu Sivakumar	Vani Jairam
3.	"Thappukottippaadunna"	Bharanikkavu Sivakumar	Srikanth
4.	"Vayaru Vishakkunnu"	Bharanikkavu Sivakumar	Jency Anthony

== Release ==
Aasheervaadam was released on 10 February 1977, and the final length of the film was 4,490.01 metres (14,731.0 ft).
