= Abhinivesham =

- Directed by: I. V. Sasi
- Written by: A. Sheriff
- Screenplay by: A. Sheriff
- Produced by: C. C. Baby; V. M. Chandi
- Starring: Padmapriya; Ravikumar; Sumithra; Jayan; Soman
- Cinematography: Vipin Das
- Edited by: K. Narayanan
- Music by: Shyam
- Production company: MS Productions
- Distributed by: MS Productions
- Release date: 17 June 1977
- Country: India
- Language: Malayalam

Abhinivesham is a 1977 Indian Malayalam film, directed by I. V. Sasi and produced by C. C. Baby and V. M. Chandi. The film stars Padmapriya, Ravikumar, Sumithra and Jayan in the lead roles. The film has musical score by Shyam. The film was a remake of Tamil film Uravu Solla Oruvan (1975).

== Plot ==
Sathi strongly wishes to marry a wealthy man and rejects Babu due to his poverty. Later when she finds that her options are limited, decides to turn Babu into a rich suitor.

== Cast ==
- Padmapriya as Sathi
- M. G. Soman as Venu
- Ravikumar as Babu
- Sumithra as Sindhu
- Jayan as Gopinath
- Sukumari as Doctor
- Jose Prakash as Mr. Menon
- T. R. Omana as Devaki
- Baby Bindu as Rajini
- Bahadoor as Rajan
- Chachappan
- Meena as Saraswathy
- Treesa

== Soundtrack ==
The music was composed by Shyam and the lyrics were written by Sreekumaran Thampi.

No.	Song	Singers	Lyrics	Length (m:ss)
1	"Mareechike Mareechike"	K. J. Yesudas, S. Janaki	Sreekumaran Thampi	3:23
2	"Orikkalomana"	P. Jayachandran	Sreekumaran Thampi	3:18
3	"Paadu Hridayame"	P. Susheela, Chorus	Sreekumaran Thampi	3:16
4	"Sandhyathan Ambalathil"	K. J. Yesudas, Chorus	Sreekumaran Thampi	3:21
5	"Sandhyathan Ambalathil" (Bit)			3:23
