= Pattalam Janaki =

- Directed by: Crossbelt Mani
- Written by: C. P. Antony
- Screenplay by: C. P. Antony
- Starring: Vincent, Unnimary; Jayan; Ravikumar; Sudheer; Vijayalalitha
- Cinematography: E. N. Balakrishnan
- Edited by: Chakrapani
- Music by: K. J. Joy
- Production company: Rose Movies
- Distributed by: Rose Movies
- Release date: 23 December 1977
- Country: India
- Language: Malayalam

Pattalam Janaki is a 1977 Indian Malayalam-language film, directed by Crossbelt Mani. The film stars Unnimary, Ravikumar, Sudheer and Vijayalalitha. The film has musical score by K. J. Joy.

== Cast ==
- Vincent
- Unnimary
- Ravikumar
- Jayan
- Sudheer
- Vijayalalitha
- Cochin Haneefa

== Soundtrack ==
The music was composed by K. J. Joy with lyrics by Mankombu Gopalakrishnan and Bharanikkavu Sivakumar.

No.	Song	Singers	Lyrics	Length (m:ss)
1	"Ankavaalillatha"	Ambili, Jolly Abraham	Mankombu Gopalakrishnan, Bharanikkavu Sivakumar	
2	"Koottilaayoru Kili"	S. Janaki	Mankombu Gopalakrishnan, Bharanikkavu Sivakumar	
3	"Melemaanathile"	P. Jayachandran, S. P. Balasubrahmanyam	Mankombu Gopalakrishnan, Bharanikkavu Sivakumar	
4	"Thaazhampoovinte"	K. J. Yesudas, P. Jayachandran	Mankombu Gopalakrishnan, Bharanikkavu Sivakumar	
5	"Thoomanju Thookunna"	K. J. Yesudas	Mankombu Gopalakrishnan, Bharanikkavu Sivakumar	
