= Angeekaaram =

- Poster
- Directed by: I. V. Sasi
- Written by: Sherif
- Screenplay by: Sherif
- Produced by: Ramachandran
- Starring: Prameela; Sridevi; Vincent; KP Ummer; Sukumaran
- Cinematography: Vipin Das
- Edited by: K. Narayanan
- Music by: A. T. Ummer
- Production company: Murali Movies
- Release date: 12 May 1977
- Country: India
- Language: Malayalam

Angeekaaram is a 1977 Indian Malayalam-language film, directed by I. V. Sasi and produced by Ramachandran. The film stars Prameela, Sridevi, Vincent, Sukumaran, K. P. Ummer and Prathapachandran. This was the first film to feature Sridevi in dual roles.

== Cast ==
- Prameela as Maalini
- Sridevi as Sathi and Viji
- Vincent as Vijayan
- Prathapachandran as Shekhara Pillai
- Sukumaran as Ravi
- Bahadoor as Gangadharan
- K. P. Ummer as Madhavan Thambi
- Kuthiravattam Pappu as Neelaambaran
- Meena as Devaki Teacher
- Ravikumar as Prasad

== Soundtrack ==
The music is composed by A. T. Ummer.

All lyrics are written by Bichu Thirumala.

| No. | Title | Singer(s) | Length |
|---|---|---|---|
| 1. | "Karpoorathulasippanthal" | K. J. Yesudas |
| 2. | "Neelajalaahsayathil" | K. J. Yesudas |
| 3. | "Neelajalaahsayathil" | S. Janaki |
| 4. | "Sharathkaala Sindhoorameghangale" | K. J. Yesudas |
| 5. | "Shishiramaasa Sandhyayile" | S. Janaki |

== Bibliography ==
- Nayak, Satyarth (2019). Sridevi: The Eternal Screen Goddess. India: Penguin Random House. ISBN 9789353056780.
