= Ashwaradham =

- Directed by: I. V. Sasi
- Written by: Prabhakar Puthur; T. Damodaran (dialogues)
- Screenplay by: V. T. Nandakumar
- Produced by: Pavamani
- Starring: Srividya; Raveendran (actor); Prameela; Balan K. Nair
- Cinematography: Jayanan Vincent
- Edited by: G.Venkitaraman
- Music by: Shyam
- Production company: Prathap Chithra
- Distributed by: Prathap Chithra
- Release date: 24 December 1980
- Country: India
- Language: Malayalam

Ashwaradham is a 1980 Indian Malayalam film, directed by I. V. Sasi and produced by Pavamani. The film stars Srividya, Raveendran (actor), Prameela and Balan K. Nair in the lead roles. The film has musical score by Shyam.

== Cast ==
- Srividya as Jayanthy Shankar
- Raveendran as Ramootti
- Prameela as Sreedevi Kunjamma
- Balan K. Nair as Veeraraghan
- Janardanan as Rajagopal
- K. P. Ummer as Shankar
- Bahadoor as Menon
- T. P. Madhavan as James
- Kuthiravattam Pappu as Velayyan
- K. P. A. C. Azeez as Kuttan
- Kuttyedathi Vilasini
- Nithya as Shanty
- Ravikumar as Gopi

== Soundtrack ==
The music was composed by Shyam and the lyrics were written by Mankombu Gopalakrishnan.

No.	Song	Singers	Lyrics	Length (m:ss)
1	"Ragasangamam"	K. J. Yesudas	Mankombu Gopalakrishnan	
2	"Thulaavarsha Melam Thudippattin Thaalam"	K. J. Yesudas, S. Janaki	Mankombu Gopalakrishnan	
3	"Ushamalarikal"	S. Janaki, Chorus	Mankombu Gopalakrishnan	
