= Oonjaal =

- Directed by: I. V. Sasi
- Written by: Sherif
- Screenplay by: Sherif
- Produced by: A. Raghunath
- Starring: Sridevi; Kaviyoor Ponnamma; Sankaradi; Bahadoor
- Cinematography: Vipin Das
- Edited by: K. Narayanan
- Music by: G. Devarajan; Lyrics: Bichu Thirumala
- Production company: Sanjay
- Distributed by: Sanjay
- Release date: 9 December 1977
- Country: India
- Language: Malayalam

Oonjaal is a 1977 Indian Malayalam-language film, directed by I. V. Sasi and produced by A. Raghunath. The film stars Sridevi, Ranichandra, M. G. Soman, and K. P. Ummer in the lead roles. The film's music was composed by G. Devarajan.

== Cast ==
- Sridevi
- Kaviyoor Ponnamma
- Sankaradi
- Bahadoor
- K. P. Ummer
- Kuthiravattam Pappu
- M. G. Soman
- Master Raghu
- Rani Chandra
- Reena
- Raghavan

== Soundtrack ==
The music was composed by G. Devarajan.

No.	Song	Singers	Lyrics	Length (m:ss)
1	"Aaravalli Thaazhvara"	P. Jayachandran, P. Madhuri, Chorus	Bichu Thirumala	
2	"Oonjaal"	P. Susheela, P. Madhuri, Chorus	Bichu Thirumala	
3	"Sreeraamachandranteyarikil"	K. J. Yesudas	Bichu Thirumala	
4	"Vembanaattu Kaayalil"	P. Madhuri	Bichu Thirumala	
