= Padakuthira =

- Promotional Poster
- Directed by: P. G. Vasudevan
- Screenplay by: P. G. Vasudevan; Raghuraj Nettur (dialogues)
- Story by: Chempil John
- Starring: Kamal Haasan; Mallika Sukumaran; R. S. Manohar; Meena
- Cinematography: C. Ramachandra Menon
- Music by: Kannur Rajan
- Production company: Malithra Productions
- Release date: 21 July 1978
- Country: India
- Language: Malayalam

Padakuthira is a 1978 Indian Malayalam-language film, directed by P. G. Vasudevan and produced by Malithra Production. The film stars Kamal Haasan, Mallika Sukumaran, R. S. Manohar and Meena. The film has musical score by Kannur Rajan. Kamal Haasan and M. S. Viswanathan sang the songs "Ragalolayaay Kamalolayaay Neelayaamini" and "Paapam Nizhal" respectively in the film album.

== Cast ==
- Kamal Haasan
- Mallika Sukumaran
- R. S. Manohar
- Meena
- Ravikumar
- Seema

== Production ==
Padakkuthira film directed by P. G. Vasudevan, produced by M. O. Devasia under production banner Malithra Enterprises. It was given an "U" (Unrestricted) certificate by the Central Board of Film Certification. The final length of the film was 3,977.57 metres (13,049.8 ft).

== Soundtrack ==
The music was composed by Kannur Rajan with lyrics by Mankombu Gopalakrishnan.

No.	Song	Singers	Lyrics
1	"Inapiriyatha"	P. Jayachandran, Nilambur Karthikeyan	Mankombu Gopalakrishnan
2	"Paapam Nizhal"	M. S. Viswanathan	Mankombu Gopalakrishnan
3	"Ragalolayaay"	Kamal Haasan & Chorus	Mankombu Gopalakrishnan
4	"Vala Kilungi"	K. J. Yesudas	Mankombu Gopalakrishnan
