= Ravikumar (actor) =

Indian actor (1954–2025)

- Born: 1 March 1954; Thrissur, Kerala, India
- Died: 4 April 2025 (aged 71); Chennai, Tamil Nadu, India
- Occupation: Actor
- Years active: 1968–2024
- Children: 2

Ravikumar Menon (1 March 1954 – 4 April 2025) was an Indian actor in Malayalam and Tamil feature films and serials. He acted in more than 100 south Indian films. He played lead roles during the 1970s. He made his debut in the Malayalam film industry in Ullasa Yaathra (1975).

== Background ==
Born to thrissur natives K.M.K. Menon and R. Bharathi, Ravikumar hailed from a family deeply rooted in the film industry. His father, K.M.K. Menon, was the founder of Sreekrishna Studio in Thiruvananthapuram one of the earliest film studios in the state and the second to be established in the district.

His mother, Bharathi, was an actress and film producer known for backing films like Divyadharsanam (1973). Growing up in this creative environment, Ravikumar developed an early interest in cinema, which eventually led him to pursue a career in acting.

== Career ==
He began his journey in cinema with the 1968 Malayalam film Lakshaprabhu and later debuted as a lead actor in Ullaasayaathra (1975).

In K. Balachander’s Avargal (1977), which marked Ravikumar’s Tamil debut, the actor starred alongside Rajinikanth, Kamal Haasan and Sujatha, among others.

In 1997, Ravikumar also began his stint in television acting with Naga’s Iyanthira Paravai from the Marmadesam series for Raj TV. He then went on to star in K. Balachander’s Jannal: Marabu Kavithaigal for Sun TV. His most famous roles were in Chithi, Selvi, Arasi, Vani Rani, En Iniya Thozhiye and Chellamay.

Ravikumar died from lung cancer in Chennai, on 4 April 2025, at the age of 71.

== Filmography ==
=== Malayalam ===
- Lakshaprabhu (1968)
- Ullaasayaathra (1975)
- Neelasaari (1976)
- Romeo (1976)
- Ayalkkaari (1976)
- Amma (1976)
- Aashirvadham (1977)
- Sreemurukan (1977)
- Innale Innu (1977)
- Yatheem (1977)
- Aanandam Paramaanandam (1977)
- Abhinivesham (1977)
- Aa Nimisham (1977)
- Madhuraswapnam (1977)
- Pattalaam Jaanaki (1977)
- Angeekaaram (1977)
- Samudram (1977)
- Thacholi Ambu (1978)
- Ninakku Njaanum Enikku Neeyum (1978)
- Aanayum Ambaariyum (1978)
- Adavukal Pathinettu (1978)
- Madhurikkunna Raathri (1978)
- Etho Oru Swapnam (1978)
- Avalude Ravukal (1978)
- Padakkuthira (1978)
- Lisa (1978)
- Amarsham (1978)
- Ee Manoharatheeram (1978)
- Aalmaaraattam (1978)
- Aval Kanda Lokam (1978)
- Tiger Salim (1978)
- Black Belt (1978)
- Thiranottam (1978)
- Ajnaatha Theerangal (1979)
- Ottapettavar (1979)
- Neelathamara (1979 film)
- Koumaarapraayam (1979)
- Jimmy (1979)
- Allauddinum Albhutha Vilakkum (1979)
- Anupallavi (1979)
- Pushyaraagam (1979)
- Ezham Kadalinakkare (1979)
- Sarppam (1979)
- Puzha (1980)
- Sakthi (1980)
- Thirayum Theeravum (1980)
- Sishirathil Oru Vasantham (1980)
- Angadi (1980)
- Ivar (1980)
- Rajaneegandhi (1980)
- Hridayam Paadunu (1980)
- Chora Chuvanna Chora (1980)
- Theenaalangal (1980)
- Theekkadal (1980)
- Swathu (1980)
- Ammayum Makalum (1980)
- Prakadanam (1980)
- Kaanthavalayam (1980)
- Ashwaradham (1980)
- Aagamanam (1980)
- Saahasam (1981)
- Nizhal Yudham (1981)
- Choothaattam (1981)
- Orikkalkkoodi (1981)
- Sphodanam (1981)
- Veliyettam (1981)
- Ankachamayam (1982)
- Rakthasaakshi (1982)
- Madrasile Mon (1982)
- Maattuvin Chattangale (1982)
- Drohi (1982)
- Jambulingam (1982)
- Karthavyam (1982)
- Chilanthivala (1982)
- Kodumkattu (1983)
- Thavalam (1983)
- Umanilayam (1984)
- Surabhi Yamangal (1984)
- Ajantha (1987)
- Kallanum Policum (1992)
- Sainyam (1994)
- Nishasurabhikal (2000)
- Agrahaaram (2001)
- Aarattu (2022)
- CBI 5: The Brain (2022)

=== Tamil ===
- Avargal (1977) as Bharani
- Allauddinum Albhutha Vilakkum (1979) as Fasul Jamal
- Pagalil Oru Iravu (1979) as Ramesh
- Ore Vaanam Ore Bhoomi (1979) as Somu
- Anandha Ragam (1982) as Pandian
- Malabar Police (1999)
- Ponnu Veetukkaran (1999)
- Rojavanam (1999)
- Vanna Thamizh Pattu (2000)
- Rishi (2001)
- Youth (2002)
- Maaran (2002)
- Ramanaa (2002)
- Gummalam (2002)
- Lesa Lesa (2003)
- Whistle (2003)
- Joot (2003)
- Oru Kalluriyin Kathai (2005)
- Kundakka Mandakka (2005)
- June R (2006)
- Sivaji (2007)
- Viyabari (2007)
- En Uyirinum Melana (2007)
- Veetla Vishesham (2022)

== Television ==
Year	Serial	Role	Channel	Language
1997	Iyandhira Paravai	Mr.SPS	Raj TV	Tamil
1999–2000	Jannal: Marabu Kavithaigal	Nellai Appan	Sun TV	Tamil
1999–2000	Anubandham		Gemini TV	Telugu
2000–2001	Chithi	Eshwarapandian / Anbucheran	Sun TV	Tamil
2005–2006	Selvi	Yogeswaran	Sun TV	Tamil
2007–2008	Arasi	Yogeswaran	Sun TV	Tamil
2007–2008	Manjal Magimai		Kalaignar TV	Tamil
2006-2008	Kasthuri	Annamalai	Sun TV	Tamil
2009	Idhayam	Gangadharan	Sun TV	Tamil
2009–2012	Chellamay	Aavudiyappan	Sun TV	Tamil
2011	Agniputhri		Asianet	Malayalam
2012	Chandralekha	Sakhavu	Asianet	Malayalam
2013–2018	Vani Rani	Manickam	Sun TV	Tamil
2014–2016	En Iniya Thozhiye		Raj TV	Tamil
2019–2020	Chocolate	Pareshwaram	Surya TV	Malayalam
2019	Ayyappa Saranam	Muni	Amrita TV	Malayalam
2019	Aranmanai Kili	Siddhar	Star Vijay	Tamil
2019–2020	Chocolate	Narayanan	Sun TV	Tamil
2020	Koodathayi		Flowers TV	Malayalam
2022–2024	Chellamma	Thiyagarajan	Star Vijay	Tamil
2023; 2024	Kannedhirey Thondrinal	Extended Special Appearance	Kalaignar TV	Tamil
