= Randu Lokam =

- Directed by: J. Sasikumar
- Written by: Maliyam Rajagopal; Pappanamkodu Lakshmanan (dialogues)
- Produced by: Hari Pothan
- Starring: Prem Nazir; Sharada; Jayabharathi; MG Soman
- Cinematography: Ashok Kumar; Ramachandra Babu
- Edited by: K. Narayanan
- Music by: G. Devarajan
- Production company: Supriya
- Distributed by: Supriya
- Release date: 30 December 1977
- Country: India
- Language: Malayalam

Randu Lokam is a 1977 Indian Malayalam film, directed by J. Sasikumar and produced by Hari Pothan. The film stars Prem Nazir, Sharada, Jayabharathi and M. G. Soman in the lead roles. The film has musical score by G. Devarajan. The film is a remake of 1971 Tamil film Savaale Samali.

== Plot ==
Randu Lokam is a 1977 Malayalam romantic drama film that explores class struggles between landlords and tenant farmers through the lens of an arranged marriage. The story centers on Surendran, a resilient tenant farmer, and Radha, the privileged daughter of a wealthy landlord. Their paths cross when Radha visits the village, and an incident where her bags fall from a cart leads to an initial conflict and exchange of insults between them. The narrative escalates during a local election, where Radha's father, confident in his victory, wagers her hand in marriage to Surendran if he loses, while Surendran stakes his lands. Surendran's unexpected win forces the marriage, thrusting Radha into an unhappy union with someone she views as beneath her social status. Unable to adjust to her new life, Radha returns to her parental home, where her mother delivers a stern lecture on the duties of a wife, emphasizing perseverance in marriage. Subsequent twists arise from family pressures and misunderstandings, with supporting characters like Santha providing emotional support and depth to the relationships. Through reconciliations and realizations about love transcending class barriers, Surendran and Radha eventually reunite, resolving the central conflict of societal divides in a heartfelt conclusion. The film frames this romantic drama against the backdrop of rural Kerala, highlighting themes of resilience and adaptation.

== Cast ==
- Prem Nazir as Surendran
- Sharada as Santha
- Jayabharathi as Radha
- M. G. Soman as Balan
- Jayan
- KPAC Lalitha as Savithri
- Kaviyoor Ponnamma
- Adoor Bhasi as Kochu Kurup
- Jose Prakash as Gopala Kuruppu
- Manavalan Joseph
- Bahadoor as Govindan
- Kunchan as Kuttan
- Meena
- Usharani

== Soundtrack ==
The music was composed by G. Devarajan and the lyrics were written by Yusufali Kechery.

No.	Song	Singers	Lyrics	Length (m:ss)
1	"Mangalyathaaliyitta"	K. J. Yesudas	Yusufali Kechery	
2	"Orkkaappurathoru Kalyanam"	P. Jayachandran, Chorus	Yusufali Kechery	
3	"Roja Malare"	P. Madhuri	Yusufali Kechery	
4	"Vembanaattu Kaayalinu"	K. J. Yesudas, Chorus	Yusufali Kechery	
5	"Vilaasa Lathike"	K. J. Yesudas, Chorus	Yusufali Kechery	
