= Akale Aakaasham =

- അകലെ ആകാശം
- Directed by: I. V. Sasi
- Written by: Sherif
- Screenplay by: Sherif
- Produced by: Thiruppathi Chettiyar
- Starring: Madhu; Vidhubala; MG Soman; Adoor Bhasi; Sridevi; Sreelatha Namboothiri
- Cinematography: C. Ramachandra Menon
- Edited by: K. Narayanan
- Music by: G. Devarajan
- Production company: Evershine
- Distributed by: Evershine
- Release date: 25 February 1977
- Country: India
- Language: Malayalam

Akale Aakaasham (മലയാളം:അകലെ ആകാശം) is a 1977 Indian Malayalam film, directed by I. V. Sasi and produced by Thiruppathi Chettiyar. The film stars Madhu, Vidhubala, M. G. Soman, Adoor Bhasi, Sridevi and Sreelatha Namboothiri in the lead roles.

== Cast ==
- Madhu
- Vidhubala
- Adoor Bhasi
- Sridevi
- Sreelatha Namboothiri
- Bahadoor
- M. G. Soman
- Meena
- Nanditha Bose
- Padmapriya

== Soundtrack ==
The music was composed by G. Devarajan and the lyrics were written by Sreekumaran Thampi.

No.	Song	Singers	Lyrics	Length (m:ss)
1	"Puthuvarsha Kahalam"	P. Jayachandran, P. Madhuri	Sreekumaran Thampi	
2	"Rajaneeyavanika"	K. J. Yesudas	Sreekumaran Thampi	
3	"Vasanthakaalam Varumennothi"	P. Madhuri	Sreekumaran Thampi	
