= Rangam =

1985 Indian film by I. V. Sasi

- Poster
- Directed by: I. V. Sasi
- Written by: M. T. Vasudevan Nair
- Starring: Mohanlal; Shobana; Raveendran
- Cinematography: N. A. Thara
- Edited by: K. Narayanan
- Music by: K. V. Mahadevan
- Production company: VICI Films International
- Distributed by: Century Release
- Release date: 14 July 1985
- Country: India
- Language: Malayalam

Rangam (transl. Scene) is a 1985 Indian Malayalam-language psychological drama film directed by I. V. Sasi and written by M. T. Vasudevan Nair. The film stars Mohanlal as Kathakali artist Appunni, along with Shobana and Raveendran. It features a musical score composed by K. V. Mahadevan.

== Plot ==
Appunni, a skilled Kathakali artist, is the cousin of Chandramathi, a classical dancer. Chandramathi dreams of going to Madras to study at a prestigious institution, but her father, Kunjikrishnan, initially opposes the idea. However, he eventually agrees after Appunni persuades him. Secretly in love with Chandramathi, Appunni finances her education in Madras.

After completing her studies, Chandramathi returns home and secures a position as a dance teacher at Sadanam, a Kathakali training center. Around the same time, Madhavan, the son of Karunakarapanicker, the owner of Sadanam, comes back from Russia. Madhavan falls in love with Chandramathi, and she reciprocates his feelings making Appunni jealous and angry with Madhavan when he walks into the hotel room where Madhavan and Chandramathi are residing. Madhavan slaps Appuni after being confronted by the latter. Although Kunjikrishnan initially disapproves of their relationship, he eventually consents under Appunni's persuasion.

Meanwhile, Jayanthi, a passionate artist and the daughter of a wealthy businessman, joins Sadanam to learn Kathakali. Her talent and charm captivate everyone, especially Madhavan. As Madhavan grows closer to Jayanthi, Chandramathi discovers their affair. Heartbroken and angry, she confronts him and then banishes Jayanthi. Madhavan is angry at Chandramathi who is angry with him in return. Madhavan also slaps Chandramathi as he did to Appunni . Heartbroken, she watches as Madhavan leaves for Mumbai with Jayanthi. This shocks Karunakarapanicker, who dies as a result.

Appunni consoles Chandramathi and encourages her to run Sadanam with dedication. In the meantime, Jayanthi abandons Madhavan, prompting him to return to Sadanam. During a Kathakali performance where Appunni portrays Bhima and Madhavan plays Dushasana, the former kills the latter in an act of rage. Appunni is arrested by the police, leaving Chandramathi devastated.

== Cast ==
- Mohanlal as Appunni
- Shobana as Chandrika/Chandramathi
- Raveendran as Madhavan
- Adoor Bhasi as Kunjikrishnan
- Raghavan as Naanu
- Sukumari as Chandrika's mother
- Santhakumari as Appunni's mother
- Kottayam Santha as Mrs. Sundaram
- Jagannatha Varma as Karunakara Panikker Ashan
- Master Suresh as Rajan
- Mahalakshmi as Jayanthi

== Soundtrack ==
The music was composed by K. V. Mahadevan, and the lyrics were written by S. Ramesan Nair.

No.	Song	Singers	Lyrics	Length (m:ss)
1	"Aaraarum Ariyaathe"	Krishnachandran	S. Ramesan Nair	
2	"Bhaavayaami Raghuraamam"	Vani Jairam		
3	"Kadhakalippadam"	Kalamandalam Hyderali	Traditional	
4	"Sarggathapassilakum Nimisham"	Vani Jairam	S. Ramesan Nair	
5	"Swaathi Hridaya"	K. J. Yesudas	S. Ramesan Nair	
6	"Thamburaan Paattinu"	Krishnachandran	S. Ramesan Nair	
7	"Vanashree Mukham"	K. S. Chithra, Krishnachandran	S. Ramesan Nair	

== Responses ==
In a retrospect review, Neelima Menon of The News Minute wrote: "Mohanlal aces the role of the unrequited lover who carries a torch for the lady. And the actor's transition is more internal, letting us buy into his vocation as a Kathakali dancer effortlessly". In 2020, while writing about Mohanlal in Mathrubhumi, writer M. T. Vasudevan Nair said that, although he loves every roles he enacted in his screenplays, Mohanlal's performance in Rangam and Sadayam stays close to his heart the most.
