= I. V. Sasi =

Indian film director

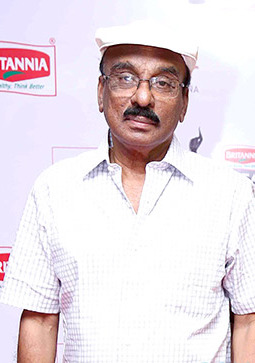
- Sasi at the 62nd Filmfare Awards South
- Born: Irruppam Veedu Sasidaran; 28 March 1948; Calicut, Madras Presidency, British India
- Died: 24 October 2017 (aged 69); Saligramam, Chennai, Tamil Nadu, India
- Education: Loyola College, Chennai
- Occupation: Film director
- Years active: 1974–2017
- Spouse: Seema (m. 1980)
- Children: 2, including Ani

Irruppam Veedu Sasidaran (28 March 1948 – 24 October 2017), known professionally as I. V. Sasi, was an Indian film director who made over 110 films predominantly in Malayalam, in addition to Tamil and Hindi languages. Before becoming a director, he had debuted as a cinematographer in the 1971 Malayalam film Prathidhwani.

In 2015, he was awarded the J. C. Daniel Award, the highest award in Malayalam cinema. Often described as a pathbreaker, Sasi made his mark during Malayalam cinema's transformative period from the 1970s to 1990s.

== Early and personal life ==
Sasi was born on 28 March 1948 in West Hill near Kozhikode, as the son of I. V. Chandran and Kausalya. He married Malayalam film actress Seema on 28 August 1980. They met on the set of his film Avalude Ravukal (1978) and she remained his favorite heroine. They worked together in over 30 movies. They have two children, daughter Anu and son Ani. Anu has acted in Symphony, directed by her father. Anu married Milan Nair on 10 December 2010. Ani is a Telugu film director.

== Career ==
Sasi has directed Malayalam movies in many genres. His war-themed movie 1921, written by screenwriter T. Damodaran, was the first Malayalam movie to be nominated in the Italian Film Festival. His Ina was the first Malayalam film about child marriage. In 1982, he shared The National film Awards' The Nargis Dutt award for the Best Feature Film on National Integration for his film Aaroodam with its producer Rosamma George. Ezhamkadalinakkare is the first Malayalam film to shoot in North America, with Manhattan being one of its locations. The song Suralokajaladhaara was filmed near in Niagara Falls, Ontario, Canada.

At the time of his death, he was working on pre-production of Burning Wells, a film based on the Kuwait war, which he was to co-direct with Sohan Roy.

== Death ==
Sasi died at his home in Saligramam, Chennai on 24 October 2017 at the age of 69 at 10:30 am, following a heart attack.

== Filmmaking ==
Known for technical command and handling massive crowds in complex sequences, I.V. Sasi is considered as the director who introduced larger canvases and vibrant narrative terrains in Malayalam cinema that were populated by the rustic and the ordinary and not by ideal and romantic. Most of his works were blended with artistic elements and commercial values. His stories were said to have charged with sensuality and a visual feel. Some of these were mostly set in an atmosphere with strong female presences. The characters in his films came from all kinds of backgrounds and some of these represented the emerging demands and desires of Kerala's civil society.

== Awards ==
National Film Awards

- 1982: Nargis Dutt Award for Best Feature Film on National Integration – Aaroodam

Kerala State Film Awards

- 1976: Best Art Director – Anubhavam
- 1984: Second Best Film – Aalkkoottathil Thaniye
- 1988: Best Popular Film – 1921
- 1989: Best Director – Mrigaya
- 2014: J. C. Daniel Award

Filmfare Awards South

- 1977: Best Director – Malayalam – Itha Ivide Vare
- 1978: Best Director – Malayalam – Eetta
- 2015: Lifetime Achievement Award

== Filmography ==
=== Malayalam ===
Year	Title	Writer	Notes	Ref.
1975	Utsavam	Sherif		
1976	Anubhavam	Sherif		
1976	Aalinganam	Sherif		
1976	Ayalkkaari	Sherif		
1976	Abhinandanam	Sherif		
1977	Aasheervaadam	Sherif		
1977	Anjali	Sherif		
1977	Akale Aakaasham	Sherif		
1977	Angeekaaram	Sherif		
1977	Abhinivesham	Sherif		
1977	Itha Ivide Vare	Padmarajan		
1977	Aa Nimisham	Sherif		
1977	Aanandham Paramaanandham	Sherif		
1977	Anthardaaham	Maniyan Sherif (dialogues)		
1977	Hridayame Sakshi	Sherif		
1977	Innale Innu	Sherif		
1977	Oonjaal	Sherif		
1978	Ee Manohara Theeram	Parappurathu		
1978	Anumodhanam	Thoppil Bhasi		
1978	Avalude Ravukal	Sherif		
1978	Amarsham	Thoppil Bhasi		
1978	Ithaa Oru Manushyan	Sreekumaran Thampi		
1978	Vadakakku Oru Hridayam	Padmarajan		
1978	Njaan Njaan Maathram	John Paul Thoppil Bhasi (screenplay and dialogues)		
1978	Eeta	Sherif (screenplay) Rajamani (story)		
1978	Iniyum Puzhayozhukum	Rose Sherif (screenplay and dialogues)		
1979	Allauddinum Albhutha Vilakkum	Sherif		
1979	Manasa Vacha Karmana	Akalevyan Sherif (screenplay and dialogues)		
1979	Anubhavangale Nanni	Kaloor Dennis S. L. Puram Sadanandan (dialogues)		
1979	Ezhamkadalinakkare	Sherif		
1979	Aarattu	T. Damodaran		
1980	Ivar	Madhavi Madhav Thoppil Bhasi (screenplay and dialogues)		
1980	Angadi	T. Damodaran		
1980	Kaantha Valayam	Thalassery Raghavan T. Damodaran (screenplay)		
1980	Karimpana	J. C. George		
1980	Meen	T. Damodaran		
1980	Ashwaradham	Prabhakar Puthur T. Damodaran (dialogues) V. T. Nandakumar (screenplay)		
1981	Orikkal Koodi	Vilasini		
1981	Thushaaram	T. Damodaran		
1981	Thrishna	M. T. Vasudevan Nair		
1981	Hamsa Geetham	T. Damodaran		
1981	Ahimsa	T. Damodaran		
1982	Ee Nadu	T. Damodaran		
1982	Ina	John Paul		
1982	Thadaakam	T. Damodaran		
1982	John Jaffer Janardhanan	T. Damodaran		
1982	Sindoora Sandhyakku Mounam	Priyadarshan (uncredited) T. Damodaran		
1982	Innalenkil Nale	T. Damodaran		
1983	America America	T. Damodaran		
1983	Iniyengilum	T. Damodaran		
1983	Nanayam	T. Damodaran		
1983	Kaikeyi	Padmarajan		
1983	Aaroodam	M. T. Vasudevan Nair		
1984	Uyarangalil	M. T. Vasudevan Nair		
1984	Athirathram	John Paul		
1984	Lakshmana Rekha	P. V. Kuriakose		
1984	Aalkkoottathil Thaniye	M. T. Vasudevan Nair		
1984	Adiyozhukkukal	M. T. Vasudevan Nair		
1984	Aksharangal	M. T. Vasudevan Nair		
1984	Kanamarayathu	Padmarajan		
1985	Rangam	M. T. Vasudevan Nair		
1985	Anubandham	M. T. Vasudevan Nair		
1985	Angadikkappurathu	T. Damodaran		
1985	Idanilangal	M. T. Vasudevan Nair		
1985	Karimpinpoovinakkare	Padmarajan		
1986	Abhayam Thedi	M. T. Vasudevan Nair		
1986	Koodanayum Kattu	John Paul		
1986	Vartha	T. Damodaran		
1986	Aavanazhi	T. Damodaran		
1987	Ithrayum Kaalam	T. Damodaran		
1987	Adimakal Udamakal	T. Damodaran		
1987	Vrutham	T. Damodaran John Paul		
1987	Naalkavala	T. Damodaran		
1988	Abkari	T. Damodaran		
1988	Anuragi	Himself (screenplay) Sherif (story and dialogues)		
1988	1921	T. Damodaran		
1988	Mukthi	A. K. Lohithadas		
1989	Aksharathettu	Sreekumaran Thampi		
1989	Mrugaya	A. K. Lohithadas		
1990	Varthamana Kalam	Prasanth		
1990	Arhatha	T. Damodaran		
1990	Midhya	M. T. Vasudevan Nair		
1991	Bhoomika	S. Balachandran John Paul (screenplay)		
1991	Inspector Balram	T. Damodaran		
1991	Neelagiri	Ranjith		
1992	Kallanum Polisum	Sreekumaran Thampi		
1992	Apaaratha	Sreekumaran Thampi		
1993	Devaasuram	Ranjith		
1993	Padhavi			
1993	Arthana	Dennis Joseph (story) Raghunath Paleri (screenplay)		
1994	The City	T. Damodaran (screenplay) Priyadarshan (story)		
1997	Varnapakittu	Jokuttan (story) Babu Janardhanan (screenplay)		
1997	Anubhoothi	Babu Janardhanan		
1999	Aayiram Meni	Reji Mathew		
2000	Sradha	T. Damodaran Dr. Rajendrababu		
2001	Ee Nadu Innale Vare	K. S. Noushad		
2002	Aabharanacharthu			
2004	Symphony	Mahesh Mithra		
2006	Balram vs. Tharadas	T. Damodaran S. N. Swamy		
2009	Vellathooval	John Paul		

=== Tamil ===
- Allauddinum Arputha Vilakkum (1979)
- Pagalil Oru Iravu (1979)
- Ore Vaanam Ore Bhoomi (1979)
- Guru (1980)
- Kaali (1980)
- Illam (1987)
- Kolangal (1995)

=== Hindi ===
- Patita (1980)
- Karishmaa (1984)
- Anokha Rishta (1986)

=== Telugu ===
- Kaali (1980)
- Guru (1980)
- Manchi Varu Maavaru (1989)
