= Anthardaaham =

- അന്തർദാഹം(ചലച്ചിത്രം))
- Directed by: I. V. Sasi
- Written by: Maniyan; Sherif (dialogues)
- Starring: Vincent; Sripriya; Sridevi; Bahadoor; K. P. Ummer; M. G. Soman
- Music by: M. K. Arjunan
- Production company: Vijayakala Chithra
- Distributed by: Vijayakala Chithra
- Release date: 14 October 1977
- Country: India
- Language: Malayalam

Anthardaaham (മലയാളം: അന്തർദാഹം(ചലച്ചിത്രം)) is a 1977 Indian Malayalam film, directed by I. V. Sasi. The film stars Sridevi, Sripriya, Bahadoor, K. P. Ummer and M. G. Soman in the lead roles. The film's musical score was composed by M. K. Arjunan.

== Cast ==
- Sridevi
- Sripriya
- Bahadoor
- K. P. Ummer
- M. G. Soman
- Vincent
- Sreekala (Rathidevi)

== Soundtrack ==
The music was composed by M. K. Arjunan and the lyrics were written by Sreekumaran Thampi.

No.	Song	Singers	Lyrics	Length (m:ss)
1	"Aashathan Oonjalil"	P. Jayachandran, Ambili	Sreekumaran Thampi	
2	"Ente Manassin"	K. J. Yesudas	Sreekumaran Thampi	
3	"Madhyaahna Swapnangal"	P. Susheela	Sreekumaran Thampi	
4	"Sraavanappulari Vannu"	K. J. Yesudas	Sreekumaran Thampi	
