= A. Sheriff =

Indian film director

- Born: Alleppey Sheriff; 1940; Alleppey, Kingdom of Travancore, British India (present day Alappuzha, Kerala, India)
- Died: 2 December 2015 (aged 74–75)
- Occupations: Director; scriptwriter; novelist; short story writer
- Years active: 1971–2003
- Spouse: Naseema
- Children: 3
- Parents: Koprakada Hameed Bava; Raheema Beevi

Alleppey Sheriff, also known as A. Sheriff (1940 – 2 December 2015), was an Indian film scriptwriter and director in Malayalam movies. He wrote the script, story and dialogue for more than 100 Malayalam movies during the 1970s and 1980s. He wrote the screenplays for movies Avalude Ravukal in 1978, Ulsavam in 1975, Eeta in 1978, and Allauddinum Albhutha Vilakkum in 1979.

== Personal life ==
He was born to Koprakada Hameed Bava and Raheema beevi in 1940 at Alappuzha. He had his primary education from Mohemmeden school, Alappuzha. He has written several short stories and novels under the name Alleppey Sheriff. Mukkumaala was the first published short story. Kalippava directed by A. B. Raj was the first movie he has screen played for. He together with I. V. Sasi has given many hits during the 1980s. He was married to Naseema. They had three children, Sheffeez, Sharaz, and Sherna.

== Partial filmography ==
=== Dialogue ===
- Prathidhwani (1971)
- Kalippaava (1972)
- Kaattuvithachavan (1973)
- Kavitha (1973)
- Alakal (1974)
- Naathoon (1974)
- Niramaala (1975)
- Ulsavam (1975)
- Odakkuzhal (1975)
- Malsaram (1975)
- Aalinganam (1976)
- Abhinandanam (1976)
- Ayalkkaari (1976)
- Anubhavam (1976)
- Innale Innu (1977)
- Akale Aakaasham (1977)
- Aanandam Paramaanandam (1977)
- Anjali (1977)
- Abhinivesham (1977)
- Anthardaaham (1977)
- Aa Nimisham (1977)
- Aasheervaadam (1977)
- Oonjaal (1977)
- Angeekaaram (1977)
- Iniyum Puzhayozhukum (1978)
- Avalude Raavukal (1978)
- Eetta (1978)
- Ithaa Oru Theeram (1979)
- Rakthamillaattha Manushyan (1979)
- Ivide Kaattinu Sugandham (1979)
- Alaavudeenum Albuthavilakkum (1979)
- Manasaa Vaacha Karmanaa (1979)
- Thuramukham (1979)
- Raajaveedhi (1979)
- Ezham Kadalinakkare (1979)
- Dooram Arike (1980)
- Puzha (1980)
- Kadalkkaattu (1980)
- Sphodanam (1981)
- Asthamikkaatha Pakalukal (1981)
- Enthino Pookkunna Pookkal (1982)
- Veedu (1982)
- Paalam (1983)
- Thirakkil Alpa Samayam (1984)
- Piriyilla Naam (1984)
- Ithaa Innu Muthal (1984)
- Oru Naal Innorunaal (1985)
- Kannaaram Pothippothi (1985)
- Anuraagi (1988)

=== Screenplay ===
- Prathidhwani (1971)
- Kalippaava (1972)
- Kavitha (1973)
- Alakal (1974)
- Naathoon (1974)
- Niramaala (1975)
- Ulsavam (1975)
- Malsaram (1975)
- Aalinganam (1976)
- Abhinandanam (1976)
- Ayalkkaari (1976)
- Anubhavam (1976)
- Innale Innu (1977)
- Akale Aakaasham (1977)
- Aanandam Paramaanandam (1977)
- Anjali (1977)
- Abhinivesham (1977)
- Aa Nimisham (1977)
- Aasheervaadam (1977)
- Oonjaal (1977)
- Angeekaaram (1977)
- Iniyum Puzhayozhukum (1978)
- Avalude Raavukal (1978)
- Eetta (1978)
- Ithaa Oru Theeram (1979)
- Rakthamillaattha Manushyan (1979)
- Ivide Kaattinu Sugandham (1979)
- Alaavudeenum Albuthavilakkum (1979)
- Manasaa Vaacha Karmanaa (1979)
- Thuramukham (1979)
- Raajaveedhi (1979)
- Ezham Kadalinakkare (1979)
- Dooram Arike (1980)
- Puzha (1980)
- Kadalkkaattu (1980)
- Sphodanam (1981)
- Asthamikkaatha Pakalukal (1981)
- Enthino Pookkunna Pookkal (1982)
- Veedu (1982)
- Paalam (1983)
- Piriyilla Naam (1984)
- Ithaa Innu Muthal (1984)
- Oru Naal Innorunaal (1985)
- Kannaaram Pothippothi (1985)
- Arangu (1991)
- Swantham Malavika (2003)

=== Story ===
- Prathidhwani (1971)
- Kalippaava (1972)
- Kaattuvithachavan (1973)
- Kavitha (1973)
- Ulsavam (1975)
- Aalinganam (1976)
- Abhinandanam (1976)
- Ayalkkaari (1976)
- Anubhavam (1976)
- Innale Innu (1977)
- Akale Aakaasham (1977)
- Anjali (1977)
- Abhinivesham (1977)
- Aa Nimisham (1977)
- Aasheervaadam (1977)
- Oonjaal (1977)
- Angeekaaram (1977)
- Avalude Raavukal (1978)
- Ithaa Oru Theeram (1979)
- Raajaveedhi (1979)
- Ezham Kadalinakkare (1979)
- Dooram Arike (1980)
- Kadalkkaattu (1980)
- Sphodanam (1981)
- Asthamikkaatha Pakalukal (1981)
- Enthino Pookkunna Pookkal (1982)
- Veedu (1982)
- Oru Naal Innorunaal (1985)
- Kannaaram Pothippothi (1985)
- Anuraagi (1988)

=== Direction ===
- Asthamikkaatha Pakalukal (1981)
