= List of Malayalam films of 1978 =

The following is a list of Malayalam films released in the year 1978.

Opening		Sl. No.	Film	Cast	Director	Music director	Notes
J A N	6	1	Gaandharvam	Prem Nazir, Adoor Bhasi	B. K. Pottekkad	M. S. Baburaj	
J A N	6	2	Theerangal	M. G. Soman, Jayabharathi, KPAC Lalitha	Rajeevnath	P. K. Sivadas, V. K. Sasidharan	
J A N	14	3	Aalmaaraattam	Vincent, Sudheer, K. P. Ummer, Ravikumar	P. Venu	M. K. Arjunan	
J A N	14	4	Aanayum Ambaariyum	Vincent, Sudheer, Ravikumar	Crossbelt Mani	Shyam	
J A N	14	5	Kudumbam Namukku Sreekovil	Prem Nazir, K. R. Vijaya, Sukumaran	Hariharan	V. Dakshinamoorthy	
J A N	20	6	Jalatharangam	Madhu, Sheela	P. Chandrakumar	A. T. Ummer	
J A N	20	7	Kaithappoo	Madhu, Raghavan, Sudheer	Raghuraman	Shyam	
J A N	26	8	Agni	Madhu, Vidhubala, Balan K. Nair	C. Radhakrishnan	A. T. Ummer	
J A N	26	9	Madanolsavam	Kamal Haasan, Zarina Wahab	N. Sankaran Nair	Salil Chowdhury	
F E B	3	10	Orkkuka Vallappozhum	M. G. Soman, Jayabharathi, K. P. Ummer	S. Babu	A. T. Ummer	
F E B	11	11	Prarthana	Prem Nazir, Jayabharathi, Sukumaran	A. B. Raj	V. Dakshinamoorthy	
F E B	17	12	Ee Manohara Theeram	Madhu, Jayabharathi, Jayan	I. V. Sasi	G. Devarajan	
F E B	17	13	Kaathirunna Nimisham	Kamal Haasan, M. G. Soman, Jayan, Jayabharathi	Baby	M. K. Arjunan	
F E B	17	14	Rowdy Ramu	Madhu, Jayabharathi, Sharada	M. Krishnan Nair	Shyam	
F E B	24	15	Anumodhanam	Kamal Haasan, Vidhubala, M. G. Soman	I. V. Sasi	A. T. Ummer	
F E B	24	16	Ekakini	Shobha, Ravi Menon	G. S. Panicker		
F E B	24	17	Kanyaka	Madhu, Sheela, Jayabharathi, Jayan	J. Sasikumar	M. K. Arjunan	
F E B	24	18	Velluvili	M. G. Soman, Jayabharathi, Janardhanan	K. G. Rajasekharan	M. S. Viswanathan	
M A R	3	19	Avalude Ravukal	M. G. Soman, Seema, Sukumaran, Ravikumar,	I. V. Sasi	A. T. Ummer	
M A R	3	20	Kalpavriksham	Prem Nazir, M. G. Soman, Jayan	J. Sasikumar	V. Dakshinamoorthy	
M A R	3	21	Society Lady	Madhu, Sharada	A. B. Raj	K. J. Joy	
M A R	8	22	Rathinirvedam	M. G. Soman, Jayabharathi, Krishnachandran	Bharathan	Devarajan	
M A R	9	23	Raju Rahim	Prem Nazir, K. P. Ummer, Raghavan	A. B. Raj	M. K. Arjunan	
M A R	9	24	Randilonnu	Sukumaran, Ushakumari, Ravi Menon	A. S. Prakasam	M. S. Viswanathan	
M A R	10	25	Priyadarshini	M. G. Soman, Kottarakkara, Raghavan, Jayasudha	Peruvaaram Chandrasekaran	M. K. Arjunan	
M A R	17	26	Rajan Paranja Kadha	M. G. Soman, Sukumaran Jose Prakash	Mani Swamy	G. Devarajan	
M A R	24	27	Amarsham	Prem Nazir, Sheela	I. V. Sasi	G. Devarajan	
M A R	24	28	Mudramothiram	Prem Nazir, Jayabharathi	J. Sasikumar	G. Devarajan	
M A R	25	29	Aval Viswasthayayirunnu	M. G. Soman, Jayabharathi	Jeassy	M. K. Arjunan	
M A R	31	30	Chuvanna Vithukal	Nilambur Balan, Kunjava	P. A. Backer		
A P R	7	31	Kadathanaattu Maakkam	Sheela, Prem Nazir, Jayan	Navodaya Appachan	G. Devarajan	
A P R	14	32	Aarum Anyaralla	M. G. Soman, Jayabharathi, Sankaradi, Adoor Bhasi	Jeassy	M. K. Arjunan	
A P R	25	33	Maattoly	M. G. Soman, Jayabharathi, Sharada, Sukumari	A. Bhimsingh	Jaya Vijaya	
A P R	25	34	Pokkattadikkaari	Vijaya Lalitha, Vincent	P. G. Vishwambharan	A. T. Ummer	
A P R	28	35	Black Belt	Vincent, Sudheer, Unnimary, Balan K. Nair	Crossbelt Mani	Shyam	
A P R	28	36	Randu Penkuttikal	Shoba, Anupama Mohan, Sukumaran	Mohan	M. S. Viswanathan	
A P R	30	37	Manimuzhakkam	Harikeshan Thampi, Veeran	P. A. Backer	Devarajan	
M A Y	4	38	Manoradham	P. Bhaskaran, Raghavan, Sharada, K. P. Ummer	P. Gopikumar	V. Dakshinamoorthy	
M A Y	4	39	Vyaamoham	Mohan Sharma, Lakshmi, Adoor Bhasi	K. G. George	Ilaiyaraaja	
M A Y	5	40	Ithaa Oru Manushyan	Madhu, Sheela, Jayan	I. V. Sasi	M. S. Viswanathan	
M A Y	12	41	Aniyara	M. G. Soman, Kaviyoor Ponnamma, Sankaradi	Bharathan	G. Devarajan	
M A Y	12	42	Kodiyettam	Bharath Gopi, K. P. A. C. Lalitha	Adoor Gopalakrishnan		
M A Y	12	43	Naalumanippookkal	Madhu, Jayabharathi, Kaviyoor Ponnamma	K. S. Gopalakrishnan	G. Devarajan	
M A Y	19	44	Aasramam	Dr. Mohandas, K. P. Ummer	K. K. Chandran	M. K. Arjunan	
M A Y	19	45	Avakaasham	M. G. Soman, Vincent, Jayabharathi, Jose Prakash	A. B. Raj	M. K. Arjunan	
M A Y	26	46	Ahalya	Sheela, Prathapachandran	Babu Nanthankodu	K. J. Joy	
M A Y	26	47	Aval Kanda Lokam	Seema, Jayan, Jose Prakash	M. Krishnan Nair	M. K. Arjunan	
M A Y	27	48	Kanalkattakal	Prem Nazir, Jayabharathi	A. B. Raj	V. Dakshinamoorthy	
J U N	2	49	Adavukal Pathinettu	Jayan, Ravikumar, Seema, Sankaradi	Vijay Anand	A. T. Ummer	
J U N	9	50	Bhaaryayum Kaamukiyum	Prem Nazir, Sheela	J. Sasikumar	M. K. Arjunan	
J U N	9	51	Raghuvamsham	Sharada, Adoor Bhasi	Adoor Bhasi	A. T. Ummer	
J U N	15	52	Vadakakku Oru Hridayam	Madhu, Jayabharathi, M. G. Soman, Raghavan	I. V. Sasi	Devarajan	
J U N	16	53	Sathrathil Oru Raathri	M. G. Soman, Sukumaran, Prathapachandran	N. Sankaran Nair	G. Devarajan	
J U N	23	54	Seemanthini	Madhu, Jayabharathi	P. G. Vishwambharan	Jaya Vijaya	
J U N	30	55	Padmatheertham	M. G. Soman, Jayabharathi, Sathaar, Jose	K. G. Rajasekharan	K. V. Mahadevan	
J U L	8	56	Vishwaroopam	M. G. Soman, Vidhubala, Vincent	Narayanan P. V. & Vasudevan T. K.	M. S. Viswanathan	
J U L	14	57	Pichipoo	P. Bhaskaran, Vidhubala, Sukumaran	P. Gopikumar	Jaya Vijaya	
J U L	21	58	Padakuthira	Kamal Haasan, Mallika Sukumaran	P. G. Vasudevan	Kannur Rajan	
J U L	21	59	Puthariyankam	Vincent, Sudheer, Unnimary	P. G. Vishwambharan	A. T. Ummer	
J U L	21	60	Uthrada Rathri	Madhu, Sukumaran, Sasi Shoba,	Balachandra Menon	Jaya Vijaya	
J U L	27	61	Adimakkachavadam	M. G. Soman, Jayabharathi, Jayan	Hariharan	G. Devarajan	
J U L	27	62	Onappudava	Sharada, Bahadoor	K. G. George	M. B. Sreenivasan	
J U L	28	63	Balapareekshanam	Raghavan, Jayabharathi	Anthikkad Mani	M. K. Arjunan	
A U G	4	64	Aanappaachan	Prem Nazir, Sheela, Jayan	A. Vincent	G. Devarajan	
A U G	11	65	Ithaanente Vazhi	Madhu, Sharada	M. Krishnan Nair	K. J. Joy	
A U G	11	66	Premashilpi	M. G. Soman, Jayabharathi, Jagathy Sreekumar	V. T. Thyagarajan	V. Dakshinamoorthy	
A U G	11	67	Soothrakkaari	Seema, Sukumaran, Jayan, Jose	Rochy Alex	A. T. Ummer	
A U G	12	68	Samayamaayilla Polum	Ambika, K. P. Ummer, Prakash, Urmila	U. P. Tomy	Salil Chowdhary	
A U G	17	69	Vilakkum Velichavum	P. Bhaskaran, Prem Nazir, Sheela	P. Bhaskaran	G. Devarajan	
A U G	18	70	Chakraayudham	Sreemoolanagaram Vijayan, Sathaar	R. Reghuvaran Nair	K. J. Joy	
A U G	18	71	Nivedyam	Prem Nazir, K. R. Vijaya, M. G. Soman	J. Sasikumar	G. Devarajan	
A U G	31	72	Avar Jeevikkunnu	Madhu, Jayabharathi	P. G. Vishwambharan	G. Devarajan	
S E P	1	73	Randu Janmam	M. G. Soman, Ushakumari	Nagavally R. S. Kurup	M. G. Radhakrishnan	
S E P	1	74	Thacholi Ambu	Prem Nazir, Sivaji Ganesan, Jayan, Balan K. Nair	Navodaya Appachan	K. Raghavan	
S E P	1	75	Thamburatti	Adoor Bhasi, Prameela	N. Sankaran Nair	G. Devarajan	
S E P	1	76	Thampu	Nedumudi Venu, Jalaja	G. Aravindan	M. G. Radhakrishnan	
S E P	14	77	Mukkuvane Snehicha Bhootham	M. G. Soman, Jayan, Unnimary	J. Sasikumar	K. J. Joy	
S E P	14	78	Vayanadan Thamban	Kamal Haasan, Bindu, Jameela Malik, Latha	A. Vincent	Paravur Devarajan	
S E P	23	79	Urakkam Varaatha Raathrikal	Madhu, Seema, Jose	M. Krishnan Nair	Shyam	
S E P	27	80	Asthamayam	Madhu, Sharada, Jayabharathi, Jayan	P. Chandrakumar	Shyam	
S E P	29	81	Ashokavanam	M. G. Soman, Sukumaran, Sudheer, Jagathy Sreekumar	M. Krishnan Nair	V. Dakshinamoorthy	
O C T	6	82	Mannu	M. G. Soman, Sharada, Sukumaran	K. G. George	A. T. Ummer	
O C T	13	83	Anubhoothikalude Nimisham	M. G. Soman, Jayan, Sharada	P. Chandrakumar	A. T. Ummer	
O C T	13	84	Ashtamudikkaayal	Prem Nazir, M. G. Soman, Jayabharathi	K. P. Pillai	V. Dakshinamoorthy	
O C T	13	85	Mattoru Karnan	M. G. Soman, Jayabharathi, Jayan	J. Sasikumar	K. J. Joy	
O C T	19	86	Avalku Maranamilla	M. G. Soman, Vidhubala, Baby Sumathi	Melattoor Ravi Varma	G. Devarajan	
O C T	19	87	Bhrashtu	Sukumaran, Sujatha, Kuthiravattam Pappu	Thriprayar Sukumaran	M. S. Baburaj	
O C T	20	88	Madhurikkunna Raathri	Vincent, Sangeetha, Mala Aravindan, Pattom Sadan	P. G. Vishwambharan	M. S. Viswanathan	
O C T	27	89	Hemantharaathri	M. G. Soman, Jayabharathi, Jayan	P. Balthasar	A. T. Ummer	
O C T	27	90	Paavaadakkaari	Unnimary, Manjula, Vincent	Rochy Alex	A. T. Ummer	
N O V	3	91	Etho Oru Swapnam	Jayan, Sheela, Sukumaran, Jagathy Sreekumar,	Sreekumaran Thampi	Salil Chowdhary	
N O V	3	92	Ninakku Njaanum Enikku Neeyum	Prem Nazir, Bhavani, Jagathy Sreekumar	J. Sasikumar	V. Dakshinamoorthy	
N O V	3	93	Njaan Njaan Maathram	Madhu, M. G. Soman, Jose, Seema	I. V. Sasi	G. Devarajan	
N O V	10	94	Aazhi Alayaazhi	Sukumaran, Anupama Mohan, Kaviyoor Ponnamma	Mani Swamy	G. Devarajan	
N O V	10	95	Beena	Madhu, Jayabharathi, Sudheer	K. Narayanan	Kannur Rajan	
N O V	10	96	Eeta	Madhu, Kamal Haasan, M. G. Soman,	I. V. Sasi	G. Devarajan	
N O V	10	97	Rappadikalude Gatha	M. G. Soman, Vidhubala	K. G. George	Devarajan	
N O V	10	98	Sundarimaarude Swapnangal	Prem Nazir, Sharada	K. Shankar	M. S. Viswanathan	
N O V	17	99	Aanakkalari	Vincent, Unnimary, Sathaar	A. B. Raj	M. K. Arjunan	
N O V	17	100	Iniyaval Urangatte	Sukumaran, Anuradha	K. G. George	M. K. Arjunan	
N O V	24	101	Aaravam	Nedumudi Venu, Prathap Pothen	Bharathan	M. G. Radhakrishnan	
N O V	24	102	Madaalasa	Y. Vijaya, Sukumaran, Sreelatha Namboothiri	J. Williams	K. J. Joy	
N O V	30	103	Snehikkan Samayamilla	Madhu, Reena, Jayan	Vijay Anand	A. T. Ummer	
D E C	1	104	Bandhanam	Shobha, Sukumaran, Shubha	M. T. Vasudevan Nair	M. B. Sreenivasan	
D E C	1	105	Ee Ganam Marakkumo	Prem Nazir, Debashree Roy	N. Sankaran Nair	Salil Chowdhary	
D E C	1	106	Paadasaram	Jose, Shobha	A. N. Thampi	G. Devarajan	
D E C	1	107	Sathrusamhaaram	Prem Nazir, Jayan	J. Sasikumar	M. K. Arjunan	
D E C	8	108	Lisa	Prem Nazir, Bhavani, M. G. Soman, Jayan	Baby	K. J. Joy	
D E C	8	109	Midukkipponnamma	Jayan, Jayabharathi	A. B. Raj	A. T. Ummer	
D E C	8	110	Snehathinte Mukhangal	Prem Nazir, Jayabharathi, Madhu	Hariharan	M. S. Viswanathan	
D E C	8	111	Snehikkan Oru Pennu	M. G. Soman, Thikkurissy Sukumaran Nair, Vasanthi	N. Sukumaran Nair	G. Devarajan	
D E C	8	112	Sthree Oru Dukham	Vidhubala, K. P. Ummer	A. G. Baby	Joshi	
D E C	17	113	Jayikkaanaay Janichavan	Prem Nazir, Sheela, M. G. Soman, Jayan	J. Sasikumar	M. K. Arjunan	
D E C	21	114	Kanchana Sita	Rama, Lakshmana	G. Aravindan	Rajeev Taranath	
D E C	22	115	Tiger Salim	Sudheer, Sheela, Vincent, Ravikumar	Joshiy	Shyam	
D E C	23	116	Iniyum Puzhayozhukum	M. G. Soman, Lakshmi	I. V. Sasi	G. Devarajan	
D E C	24	117	Thanal	M. G. Soman, Rani Chandra	Rajeevnath	Jithin Shyam	
D E C	29	118	Nakshathrangale Kaaval	M. G. Soman, Jayabharathi	K. S. Sethumadhavan	G. Devarajan	
			Aaro Oral	Protima, T. Ravindranath	V. K. Pavithran	G. Aravindan	
			Yagaswam	Prem Nazir, Vidhubala, K. R. Vijaya	Hariharan	M. S. Baburaj	
			Muhammadum Musthafayum			M. S. Viswanathan	
			Ammuvinte Aattinkutty	Bahadoor, Thrissur Elsy	Ramu Kariat	G. Devarajan	
			Neelambari				
			Karimpuli	Vincent, Jose Prakash	Karnan	G. Devarajan, M. K. Arjunan	
			Tharoo Oru Janmam Koodi				

== Dubbed films ==
Movie	Year	Direction	Story	Screenplay	Main Actors
Kaadu Njangalude Veedu		R. S. Babu
Anthony Punnyavaalan
Parassuraman		C. S. Rao
Shilayugathile Sundharikal		G. R. Moorthy
Aaru Manikkoor		Devaraj Mohan
Prathyaksha Deivam		K. Sankar
Mishiha Charithram		A. Bhimsingh
