= List of Malayalam films of 1980 =

The following is a list of Malayalam films released in the year 1980.

Opening		Sl. No.	Film	Cast	Director	Lyricist	Music director	Notes
J A N	4	1	Makara Vilakku	Jose, Sankaradi	P. K. Joseph	Sreekumaran Thampi	K. J. Joy	
J A N	25	2	Ivar	M. G. Soman, Sukumaran, Sharada, Seema,	I. V. Sasi	P. Bhaskaran	G. Devarajan	
J A N	25	3	Kadalkkaattu	M. G. Soman, Jayabharathi,	P. G. Vishwambharan	Bichu Thirumala	A. T. Ummer	
F E B	8	4	Air Hostess	Prem Nazir, Rajani Sharma	P. Chandrakumar	O. N. V. Kurup	Salil Chowdhary	
F E B	8	5	Chora Chuvanna Chora	Madhu, G. K. Pillai	G. Gopalakrishnan	Mullanezhi, G. K. Pallath	G. Devarajan	
F E B	12	6	Adhikaram	Sukumaran, Seema,	P. Chandrakumar	Sathyan Anthikkad	A. T. Ummer	
F E B	15	7	Aarohanam	Nedumudi Venu, Prathap Pothen	A. Sheriff	Poovachal Khader	Shyam	
F E B	15	8	Kari Puranda Jeevithangal	Prem Nazir, Jayan, Jayabharathi	J. Sasikumar		M. K. Arjunan	
F E B	21	9	Vazhimariya Paravakal		S. Jagadeesan			
F E B	22	10	Kochu Kochu Thettukal	Sukumaran, Shubha	Mohan	Bichu Thirumala	Shyam	
F E B	29	11	Dooram Arike	M. G. Soman, Sukumaran	Jeassy		Ilaiyaraaja	
F E B	29	12	Love in Singapore	Prem Nazir, Jayan	Baby		Shankar–Ganesh	
M A R	3	13	Ammayum Makalum	Jayabharathi, Jose	Stanley Jose		Shyam	
M A R	7	14	Pavizha Mutthu	M. G. Soman, Sankaradi, Bahadoor	Jeassy		G. Devarajan	
M A R	14	15	Ithikkara Pakki	Prem Nazir, Jayan, Jayabharathi,	J. Sasikumar	Bichu Thirumala	Traditional	
M A R	21	16	Shalini Ente Koottukari	Sukumaran, Shobha, Jalaja	Mohan		G. Devarajan	
M A R	21	17	Agni Kshethram	Prem Nazir, Srividya	P. T. Rajan		K. J. Joy	
M A R	21	18	Daaliya Pookkal	Pappan, Roopesh	Prathap Singh		Kanjangad Ramachandran	
M A R	28	19	Iniyum Marichittillatha Nammal	Sashi Kumar, T. V. Chandran	Chintha Ravi			
A P R	3	20	Theekkadal	Prem Nazir, Madhu, Sukumaran	Navodaya Appachan	Bichu Thirumala	Guna Singh	
A P R	11	21	Benz Vasu	Jayan, Seema	Hassan		A. T. Ummer	
A P R	18	22	Angadi	Jayan, Sukumaran, Seema	I. V. Sasi	Bichu Thirumala	Shyam	
A P R	18	23	Kaavalmaadam	Sukumaran, Jose, Ambika	P. Chandrakumar		A. T. Ummer	
A P R	24	24	Vilkkanundu Swapnangal	Sukumaran, Sudheer	Azad		M. B. Sreenivasan	
A P R	25	25	Chandra Bimbam	M. G. Soman, Jayabharathi, Prathap Pothen	N. Sankaran Nair		Shankar–Ganesh	
A P R	25	26	Esthappan	Rajan Kakkanadan, Krishnapuram Leela	G. Aravindan		Janardhan, G. Aravindan	
A P R	25	27	Theenalangal	Jayan, Sheela	J. Sasikumar		M. K. Arjunan	
A P R	25	28	Mr. Michael	Prem Nazir, Jose	J. Williams	Bichu Thirumala	Chakravarthy	
M A Y	9	29	Maro Charitra	Kamal Haasan, Saritha	K. Balachander		M. S. Viswanathan	
M A Y	9	30	Ambalavilakku	Madhu, Srividya	Sreekumaran Thampi		V. Dakshinamoorthy	
M A Y	16	31	Akalangalil Abhayam	Madhu, Sheela, M. G. Soman	Jeassy		G. Devarajan	
M A Y	16	32	Idi Muzhakkam	Jayan, Sukumaran, Ratheesh	Sreekumaran Thampi		Shyam	
J U N	6	33	Eden Thottam	M. G. Soman, Jayabharathi	P. Chandrakumar		Shyam	
J U N	12	34	Thirayum Theeravum	Prem Nazir, M. G. Soman, Jayabharathi	K. G. Rajasekharan		G. Devarajan	
J U N	12	35	Kalika	Sukumaran, Sheela,	Balachandra Menon		G. Devarajan	
J U N	14	36	Saraswathi Yaamam	M. G. Soman, Raghavan, Prameela	Mohan Kumar		A. T. Ummer	
J U N	19	37	Kaantha Valayam	Jayan, Krishnachandran	I. V. Sasi		Shyam	
J U N	25	38	Chamaram	Prathap Pothan, Nedumudi Venu	Bharathan		M. G. Radhakrishnan	
J U N	27	39	Thaliritta Kinakkal	Sukumaran, Prathap Pothen,	P. Gopikumar		Jithin Shyam	
J U L	4	40	Youvanam Daaham	Jose, Shubha	Crossbelt Mani		M. G. Radhakrishnan	
J U L	4	41	Cheriyachante Kroorakrithyangal	Adoor Bhasi, Kaviyoor Ponnamma	John Abraham		Johnson	
J U L	11	42	Soorya Daaham	Sukumari, Shobha	Mohan	Bichu Thirumala	G. Devarajan	
J U L	11	43	Rajaneegandhi	Madhu, Lakshmi	M. Krishnan Nair		G. Devarajan	
J U L	25	44	Ithile Vannavar	Madhu, Sukumaran, Sheela	P. Chandrakumar		Shyam	
A U G	1	45	Dwik Vijayam	Prem Nazir, Srividya	M. Krishnan Nair		G. Devarajan	
A U G	1	46	Aniyaatha Valakal	Sukumaran, M. G. Soman	Balachandra Menon	Bichu Thirumala	A. T. Ummer	
A U G	7	47	Prakriti Manohari	Jagannatha Varma, Lisha	G. S. Panicker			
A U G	8	48	Avan Oru Ahankaari	Sheela, Jose Prakash	K. G. Rajasekharan	Bichu Thirumala	M. S. Viswanathan	
A U G	15	49	Paalattu Kunjikannan	Prem Nazir, Jayabharathi	Boban Kunchacko		G. Devarajan	
A U G	15	50	Chandrahaasam	Prem Nazir, Jayan	Baby		K. J. Joy	
A U G	22	51	Sakthi	Jayan, Seema	Vijay Anand	Bichu Thirumala	K. J. Joy	
A U G	23	52	Meen	Madhu, Jayan	I. V. Sasi		G. Devarajan	
A U G	23	53	Lava	Prem Nazir, Jagathy Sreekumar	Hariharan		G. Devarajan	
A U G	23	54	Lorry	Prathap Pothen, Achankunju	Bharathan		M. S. Viswanathan	
A U G	23	55	Swarga Devatha	Sharada, K. P. Ummer	Charles Ayyampally		M. S. Viswanathan	
A U G	30	56	Malankattu	Babu, Prathima	Ramu Kariyat		K. Raghavan	
S E P	5	57	Puzha	M. G. Soman, Srividya	Jeassy		M. K. Arjunan	
S E P	19	58	Hridhayam Paadunnu	M. G. Soman, Jose, Jagathy Sreekumar	G. Premkumar		K. J. Joy	
S E P	27	59	Swattu	Jagathy Sreekumar, Thikkurissy Sukumaran Nair	N. Sankaran Nair		G. Devarajan	
S E P	27	60	Bhaktha Hanuman		Ganga		V. Dakshinamoorthy	
S E P	27	61	Vedikkettu	Sukumaran, Jalaja	K. A. Sivadas		M. K. Arjunan	
O C T	2	62	Swandam Enna Padam	Madhu, Srividya	Sreekumaran Thampi		Shyam	
O C T	3	63	Pralayam	Prem Nazir, Jayabharathi	P. Chandrakumar		A. T. Ummer	
O C T	10	64	Shishirathil Oru Vasantham	Sukumaran, Shubha,	Keyaar		Shyam	
O C T	16	65	Karimpana	Jayan, Seema	I. V. Sasi	Bichu Thirumala	A. T. Ummer	
O C T	16	66	Oru Varsham Oru Maasam	M. G. Soman, Jayabharathi, Sankaradi	J. Sasikumar		Raveendran	
O C T	16	67	Chaakara	Jayan, Sukumaran, Seema	P. G. Vishwambharan		G. Devarajan	
O C T	31	68	Raagam Thaanam Pallavi	M. G. Soman, Srividya, Sankaradi	A. T. Abu		M. K. Arjunan	
O C T	31	69	Oormakale Vida Tharu	Srividya, Prathap Pothen	Ravi Gupthan		K. J. Joy	
O C T	31	70	Prakadanam	M. G. Soman, Prathapachandran, Balan K. Nair	J. Sasikumar		G. Devarajan	
N O V	6	71	Ishtamanu Pakshe	Sukumaran, Jagathy Sreekumar, Venu Nagavally	Balachandra Menon		G. Devarajan	
N O V	6	72	Pappu	M. G. Soman, Prathap Pothen, Seema	Baby	Bichu Thirumala	K. J. Joy	
N O V	12	73	Muthuchippikal	Madhu, M. G. Soman, Srividya	Hariharan		Traditional	
N O V	14	74	Anthappuram	Prem Nazir, Ambika	K. G. Rajasekharan		Shankar–Ganesh	
N O V	14	75	Deepam	Madhu, Jayan	P. Chandrakumar		Shyam	
N O V	21	76	Moorkhan	Jayan, Seema	Joshiy		A. T. Ummer	
N O V	21	77	Theeram Thedunnavar	Prem Nazir, Sukumaran	P. Chandrakumar		M. S. Viswanathan	
N O V	27	78	Naayattu	Prem Nazir, Jayan	Sreekumaran Thampi		Shyam	
N O V	28	79	Vaiki Vanna Vasantham	Madhu, Srividya	Balachandra Menon		Shyam	
D E C	5	80	Mela	Sharaf	K. G. George		M. B. Sreenivasan	
D E C	5	81	Aagamanam	M. G. Soman, Ravikumar, Srividya	Jeassy		Vidyadharan	
D E C	12	82	Ival Eevazhi Ithu Vare	Jayabharathi, Adoor Bhasi	K. G. Rajasekharan		Shankar–Ganesh	
D E C	12	83	Sathyam	Sreenath, Sathaar	M. Krishnan Nair	Bichu Thirumala	A. T. Ummer	
D E C	17	84	Manushya Mrugam	Jayan, Jagathy Sreekumar	Baby		K. J. Joy	
D E C	19	85	Seetha	Sukumari, Thikkurissy Sukumaran Nair	P. Govindan		M. K. Arjunan	
D E C	24	86	Arangum Aniyarayum	Sukumaran, Sankaradi,	P. Chandrakumar		A. T. Ummer	
D E C	24	87	Ashwaradham	Srividya, Raveendran	I. V. Sasi		Shyam	
D E C	25	88	Manjil Virinja Pookkal	Shankar, Poornima Jayaram	Fazil	Bichu Thirumala	Jerry Amaldev	
D E C	25	89	Nattuchakkeruttu	Sheela, Sreelatha Namboothiri	Ravi Gupthan		G. Devarajan	
D E C	30	90	Sooryante Maranum	Nedumudi Venu, Ravi Alummoodu	Rajeevnath			

== Dubbed films ==
Title	Director(s)	Original film		Cast	Ref.
Title	Director(s)	Film	Language	Cast	Ref.
Niram Maaratha Pookkal	Bharatiraja	Niram Maaratha Pookkal	Tamil		
Sankarabharanam	K. Viswanath	Sankarabharanam	Telugu	Somayajalu, Manju Bhargavi	
