= Aarattu (1979 film) =

1979 film directed by I. V. Sasi

- Poster
- Directed by: I. V. Sasi
- Screenplay by: T. Damodaran
- Produced by: Ramachandran
- Starring: Jose; Seema; Shoma Anand; Vincent
- Cinematography: Jayanan Vincent
- Edited by: K. Narayanan
- Music by: A. T. Ummer
- Production company: Murali Movies
- Release date: 21 December 1979
- Country: India
- Language: Malayalam

Aarattu (transl. Ritual bath) is a 1979 Indian Malayalam-language drama film directed by I. V. Sasi, written by T. Damodaran, and produced by Ramachandran. The plot revolves around the life of fire workers in Kerala. The film stars Jose and Seema, along with Hindi actress Shoma Aanand, Balan K. Nair and Kaviyoor Ponnamma in important roles. A. T. Ummer composed the musical score.

== Cast ==
- Balan K. Nair as Chakko
- Kuthiravattam Pappu as Uthupp
- Seema as Lizy
- Shoma Anand as Mary
- Kaviyoor Ponnamma
- Jose as Joyi
- Sankaradi as Vareethu
- Prathapachandran
- Bahadoor as Philipose
- Kunchan
- Meena as Thresya
- Nellikode Bhaskaran as Pathrose
- T. P. Madhavan
- Vincent

== Soundtrack ==
The music was composed by A. T. Ummer and the lyrics were written by Bichu Thirumala.

No.	Song	Singers	Lyrics	Length (m:ss)
1	"Ee Manjaveyilppoo"	S. Janaki	Bichu Thirumala	
2	"Romancham Poothu"	P. Jayachandran, Ambili	Bichu Thirumala	
3	"Swapnagopurangal"	K. J. Yesudas	Bichu Thirumala	
