= Vijayam Nammude Senani =

- Directed by: K. G. Rajasekharan
- Written by: K. S. Rajasekharan
- Screenplay by: Joseph Madappally
- Produced by: G. P. Balan
- Starring: Jose; Jose Prakash; Pattom Sadan; Balan K. Nair
- Cinematography: Kanniyappan
- Edited by: V. P. Krishnan
- Music by: Shankar–Ganesh; Lyrics: Bichu Thirumala
- Production company: Chanthamani Films
- Distributed by: Chanthamani Films
- Release date: 8 June 1979
- Country: India
- Language: Malayalam

Vijayam Nammude Senani is a 1979 Indian Malayalam film, directed by K. G. Rajasekharan and produced by G. P. Balan. The film stars Jose, Jose Prakash, Pattom Sadan and Balan K. Nair in the lead roles. The film has musical score by Shankar–Ganesh.

== Cast ==
- Jose
- Jose Prakash
- Pattom Sadan
- Balan K. Nair
- Janardanan
- K. P. Ummer
- Vijayalalitha
- Priya

== Soundtrack ==
The music was composed by Shankar–Ganesh and the lyrics were written by Bichu Thirumala.

No.	Song	Singers	Lyrics	Length (m:ss)
1	"Oh Poojaari Oru Raavil"	Ambili	Bichu Thirumala	
2	"Pralayaagni Pole"	K. P. Brahmanandan, Chorus	Bichu Thirumala	
3	"Thumbappookkunnumele"	Ambili	Bichu Thirumala	
4	"Vijayam Nammude Senaani"	K. J. Yesudas, Ambili	Bichu Thirumala	
