= Adoor Bhavani =

Indian actress

- Born: 1927; Adoor, Travancore, British Raj
- Died: 25 October 2009 (aged 82); Adoor, Kerala, India
- Occupation: Actress
- Spouse: Janardhanan Pillai
- Children: Rajeev
- Parent(s): K Raman Pillai, Kunjukunjamma

Adoor Bhavani (1927 – 25 October 2009) was an Indian actress in Malayalam cinema, best known for her appearance in the National Award-winning film Chemmeen (1965), directed by Ramu Kariat. She had acted in about 450 films, including Mudiyanaya Puthran, Thulabharam, Kallichellamma, and Anubhavangal Paalichakal. Her last film was the 2004 K. Madhu-directed Sethurama Iyer CBI. She was also a stage actress and was associated with popular theatre group KPAC.

Bhavani was born in Adoor in Travancore. Her sister, Adoor Pankajam, was also a Malayalam film actress. Adoor Bhavani died on 25 October 2009.

== Awards and recognitions ==
In 1969, Bhavani won the Kerala state film award for the second best actress for the film Kallichellamma. She received the Kerala Sangeetha Nataka Akademi Award for Drama in 1982. She was awarded the Chalachithra Saparya Lifetime Achievement award by Mathrubhumi-Medimix in 2002. In 2008, Kerala Sangeetha Nataka Academy honoured Bhavani and Pankajam for their overall contributions to theatre and drama.

== Filmography ==
=== 1950s ===
Year	Title	Role	Notes
1953	Sheriyo Thetto		
1957	Padatha Painkili	Paaru	

=== 1960s ===
Year	Title	Role	Notes
1961	Mudiyanaya Puthran	Rajan's mother	
1962	Bhagyajathakam	Bhargaviyamma	
1962	Puthiya Akasam Puthiya Bhoomi	Ealiyamma	
1963	Ninamaninja Kalpadukal	Rahel	
1965	Shyamala Chechi	Parvathiyamma	
1965	Kalyana Photo	Parvuamma	
1965	Chemmeen	Chakki	
1965	Odayil Ninnu	Pappu's mother	
1968	Thulabharam		
1969	Kadalpalam	Khadeeja	
1969	Virunnukari	Kalyani	
1969	Kallichellamma	Valliyakka	
1969	Adimakal	Karthiyayini	
1969	Koottukudumbam	Karthyayanipilla	
1969	Nadi	Kunjeli	

=== 1970s ===
Year	Title	Role	Notes
1970	Nilakkatha Chalanangal		
1970	Sthri	Kalyaniyamma	
1970	Thara	Pankajam	
1970	Vivaham Swargathil		
1970	Kakkathamburatti	Kushinikaali	
1970	Pearl View	Annie	
1970	Kurukshethram		
1971	Vilakku Vangiya Veena	Bharathi	
1971	Vithukal	Amma	
1971	Bobanum Moliyum	Kuttiyamma	
1971	Karakanakadal	Maria	
1971	Puthenveedu		
1972	Mayiladumkunnu	Kochu Mariya	
1972	Sambhavami Yuge Yuge	Kalyani Amma	
1972	Swayamvaram	Janaki	
1972	Maaya	Kalyani	
1972	Chembarathi	Santha's mother	
1972	Akkarapacha	Naaniyamma	
1973	Mazhakaaru	Malathi's mother	
1973	Panitheeratha Veedu		
1973	Yamini	Govindan's mother	
1973	Divyadharsanam	Ammukutty	
1973	Udayam	Bhavaniyamma	
1973	Manushyaputhran	Madhavi's mother	
1973	Swapnam		
1974	Nellu	Pempi	
1976	Yakshagaanam	Rajani's mother	
1976	Neela Sari		
1976	Srishti		
1977	Poojakkedukkatha Pookkal	Narayanan's mother	
1977	Kodiyettam	Santhamma's mother	
1977	Sreemurukan		
1977	Harshabashpam	Naarayani	
1977	Yudhakandam	Gouriyamma	
1978	Iniyum Puzhayozhukum	Celin's Servant	
1978	Vadakakku Oru Hridayam	Karthyayani	
1978	Kaithappoo		
1978	Aarum Anyaralla	Devaki	
1978	Ashtamudikkaayal		
1978	Rowdy Ramu	Vaasu's mother	
1978	Kodiyettam	Santhamma's mother	
1979	Kalliyankattu Neeli	Gouriyamma	
1979	Choola		
1979	Mochanam		
1979	Kayalum Kayarum	Devaki	
1979	Jeevitham Oru Gaanam	Mariyamma	
1979	Pratheeksha		
1979	Ival Oru Naadody		
1979	Vaaleduthaven Vaalaal		
1979	Peruvazhiyambalam	Old lady	
1979	Sarapancharam		
1979	Kannukal	Kalyani	
1979	Sarpam		

=== 1980s ===
Year	Title	Role	Notes
1980	Ammayum Makalum		
1980	Ambalavilakku	Gopi's mother	
1980	Aniyatha Valakal	Lakshmi	
1980	Saraswatheeyamam	Lakshmikutty	
1980	Thaliritta Kinakkal	Karthyayaniyamma	
1981	Palangal	Ramankutty's mother	
1981	Veliyattam	Mariya	
1981	Kadathu		
1982	Njanonnu Parayatte	Eli	
1982	Maniyan Pilla Adhava Maniyan Pilla	Maniyan's mother	
1982	Vidhichathum Kothichathum	Santhamma	
1982	Chiriyo Chiri	Neena's grandmother	
1982	Shari Alla Sharada		
1983	Rugma	Rugma's grandmother	
1983	Lekhayude Maranam Oru Flashback	Vishalakshi's mother	
1984	April 18	Naniyamma	
1984	Uyarangalil	Johnie's mother	
1984	Muthodu Muthu		
1984	Ningalil Oru Sthree	Parukuttiyamma	
1984	Manithali	Chenachi Umma	
1984	Ethirppukal	Bhargaviyamma	
1985	Aviduthepole Ivideyum	Muthassi	
1985	Onnanam Kunnil Oradi Kunnil		
1985	Kandu Kandarinju	Chellamma	
1985	Adhyayam Onnu Muthal	Naniyamma	
1985	Oru Nokku Kanan	Kathreena	
1986	T. P. Balagopalan M.A.	Balagopalan's grandmother	
1986	Sree Narayana Guru		
1986	Oppam Oppathinoppam	Karthyayani	
1986	Snehamulla Simham	Paruvamma	
1986	Nyayavidhi	Kochanna	
1986	Nimishangal	Karthyayani	
1986	Poomukhappadiyil Ninneyum Kaathu	Kunjelemma	
1987	Nirabedhangal	Maya's grandmother	
1987	Achuvettante Veedu	Mary	
1987	Athinumappuram		
1988	Oru CBI Diary Kurippu	Mary	
1988	Janmantharam	Aliyamma	
1988	Aalilakkuruvikal		
1988	Sanghunadam	Thulasi's mother	
1989	Jagratha	Mary	
1989	Oru Sayanathinte Swapnam	Veronica	
1989	Rugmini	Chinnuvakkan	

=== 1990s ===
Year	Title	Role	Notes
1990	Purappadu	Eli	
1990	Ammayude Swantham Kunju Mary	Naniyamma	
1990	Ponnaranjanam		
1991	Koodikazhcha	Mathchan's mother	
1991	Nayam Vyakthamakkunnu	Bhageerathi	
1991	Akashakottayile Sulthan	Pappy's sister	
1991	Chanchattam	Yamuna's Grandmother	
1991	Kottayam Kunjachan	'Maramkeri' Mariamma	
1991	Souhridam	Karthyayaniyamma	
1991	Arangu	Aparna's grandmother	
1991	Keli	Paruvamma	
1992	Ellarum Chollanu	Mani's mother	
1992	Sathya Prathinja	Sreedharan's mother	
1992	Ardram	Karithalla	
1992	Kudumbasametham	Naniyamma	
1993	Injakkadan Mathai and Sons	Shanthamma	
1993	Oru Kadankatha Pole		
1993	Ponnuchami		
1993	Padaliputhram		
1993	Ithu Manjukalam	Pankiyamma	
1994	Chanakya Soothrangal	Venu's mother	
1994	Bhagyavan	Devaki	
1994	Dadha	Tea vendor	
1995	Oru Abhibhashakante Case Diary	Deenamma/Annamma	
1995	Punnaram		
1995	Minnaminuginum Minnukettu	Paruvamma	
1995	Thumbolikadappuram		
1995	Vrudhanmare Sookshikkuka	Thara's grandmother	
1995	Thirumanassu	Ammini	
1995	Thovalapookkal	Seetha paatti	
1995	Mangala Soothram	Narayaniyamma	
1995	Aniyan Bava Chetan Bava	Premachandran's grandmother	
1995	Radholsavam	Seethamma's grandmother	
1996	Hitler	Bhargavi	
1996	British Market	Bhavani	
1996	Kadhapurushan	Midwife	
1997	Gajaraja Manthram	Hostel warden	
1997	Mannadiar Penninu Chenkotta Checkan	Midwife	
1998	Oro Viliyum Kathorthu	Lakshmi	
1998	Meenathil Thalikettu	Kaimal's grandmother	
1998	Gloria Fernandez From USA	Thandamma	

=== 2000s ===
Year	Title	Role	Notes
2000	Ramayanakkili		
2000	Mark Antony	Kunjeli	
2000	Kannaadikkadavathu	Thumbi's grandmother	
2004	Sethurama Iyer CBI	Mary	

=== 2010s ===
Year	Title	Role	Notes
2014	Tharangal		Archive footage

== Dramas ==
- Veluthampi Dalawa
- Mooladhanam
- Ashwamedham
- Thulabharam
- Mudiyanaya Puthran
- Yudhakandam
- Parithranayam
- Pamsula
- Rangapooja
- Paashupathrasthram
- Penal Code
- Chakravarthini
- Paadam Onnu
- Anyayam

== See also ==
- National Film Awards
- Chemmeen
