= Vaaleduthaven Vaalaal =

- Directed by: K. G. Rajasekharan
- Written by: Pappanamkodu Lakshmanan
- Screenplay by: Pappanamkodu Lakshmanan
- Produced by: George Abraham
- Starring: Prem Nazir; Jose; Jose Prakash; Pattom Sadan
- Cinematography: Balagangadhara Menon
- Edited by: N. P. Suresh
- Music by: A. T. Ummer
- Production company: Syamanthakam Arts
- Distributed by: Syamanthakam Arts
- Release date: 25 January 1979
- Country: India
- Language: Malayalam

Vaaleduthaven Vaalaal is a 1979 Indian Malayalam film, directed by K. G. Rajasekharan and produced by George Abraham. The film stars Prem Nazir, Jose, Jose Prakash and Pattom Sadan in the lead roles. The film has musical score by A. T. Ummer.

== Cast ==
- Prem Nazir
- Jose
- Jose Prakash
- Pattom Sadan
- Prameela
- Unnimary
- Adoor Bhavani
- Balan K. Nair
- Janardanan
- K. P. Ummer
- Kunchan
- Meena
- Paravoor Bharathan
- Vidhubala
- Bhavani

== Soundtrack ==
The music was composed by A. T. Ummer and the lyrics were written by Chirayinkeezhu Ramakrishnan Nair.

No.	Song	Singers	Lyrics	Length (m:ss)
1	"Innallo Ponthiruvonam"	K. J. Yesudas, Ambili	Chirayinkeezhu Ramakrishnan Nair	
2	"Pinakkam Bhaavichirunnalum"	K. J. Yesudas, Ambili	Chirayinkeezhu Ramakrishnan Nair	
3	"Thulavarsha Nandini"	P. Jayachandran, Ambili, Manoharan	Chirayinkeezhu Ramakrishnan Nair	
