= Rakthamillatha Manushyan =

- Directed by: Jeassy
- Written by: V. T. Nandakumar; A. Sheriff (dialogues)
- Screenplay by: A. Sheriff
- Produced by: J. J. Kuttikkad
- Starring: M. G. Soman; Jayabharathi; Adoor Bhasi; Jose; Manavalan Joseph
- Cinematography: Anandakuttan
- Music by: M. K. Arjunan
- Production company: Kuttikkattil Films
- Distributed by: Kuttikkattil Films
- Release date: 30 March 1979
- Country: India
- Language: Malayalam

Rakthamillatha Manushyan is a 1979 Indian Malayalam film, directed by Jeassy and produced by J. J. Kuttikkad. The film stars Soman, Jayabharathi, Adoor Bhasi, Jose and Manavalan Joseph in the lead roles. It features a musical score by M. K. Arjunan.

== Cast ==
- M. G. Soman as Sivan
- Jayabharathi as Rukmini
- Adoor Bhasi as Ramalinga Chettiyar
- Jose as Baby
- Manavalan Joseph as Antrayose
- Kanchana as Yamuna
- Meena as Sumathi's mother
- Vidhubala as Sophie
- Veeran as Sumathi's father
- Shubha as Sumathi
- Sankaradi as Appayya/Mathai
- Sukumari as Kamala Ambal
- Jose Prakash as Menon

== Soundtrack ==
The music was composed by M. K. Arjunan, with the lyrics written by Sathyan Anthikkad.

No.	Song	Singers	Lyrics	Length (m:ss)
1	"Etho Kinaavinte"	Vani Jairam	Sathyan Anthikkad	
2	"Ezhaamkadalinakkareyakkare"	Ambili, Chorus	Sathyan Anthikkad	
3	"Thirakal"	K. J. Yesudas	Sathyan Anthikkad	
