= Aambal Poovu =

- Directed by: Harikumar
- Written by: Hari Kumar; Perumpadavam Sreedharan (dialogues)
- Screenplay by: Perumpadavam Sreedharan
- Produced by: Soumyachithra
- Starring: Sukumari; Jagathy Sreekumar; Jose; Prakash
- Cinematography: Hemachandran
- Edited by: A. Sukumaran
- Music by: V. Dakshinamoorthy
- Production company: Soumyachithra
- Distributed by: Soumyachithra
- Release date: 4 December 1981
- Country: India
- Language: Malayalam

Aambal Poovu is a 1981 Indian Malayalam film, directed by Harikumar and produced by Soumyachithra. The film stars Sukumari, Jagathy Sreekumar, Jose and Prakash in the lead roles. The film has musical score by V. Dakshinamoorthy.

== Cast ==
- Sukumari
- Jagathy Sreekumar
- Jose
- Prakash
- Sukumaran
- Chithran
- Dhanya
- Jalaja
- Janardanan
- K. G. Warrier
- P. K. Venukkuttan Nair
- Roopa
- Sasidharan
- Suchitra

== Soundtrack ==
The music was composed by V. Dakshinamoorthy and the lyrics were written by Kavalam Narayana Panicker.

| No. | Song | Singers | Lyrics | Length (m:ss) |
|---|---|---|---|---|
| 1 | "Maanthen Mizhikalil" | Usha Ravi | Kavalam Narayana Panicker | |
| 2 | "Moovanthipparambiloode" | K. J. Yesudas | Kavalam Narayana Panicker | |
| 3 | "Naadhim Naadhim" | Ambili | Kavalam Narayana Panicker | |
| 4 | "Poochakkurinji" | Vani Jairam | Kavalam Narayana Panicker | |
