= Ahimsa (1981 film) =

1981 film by I. V. Sasi

- Directed by: I. V. Sasi
- Written by: T. Damodaran
- Produced by: P. V. Gangadharan; Grihalakshmi
- Starring: Sukumaran; Mammootty; Mohanlal; Ratheesh; Poornima Jayaram; Menaka; Seema
- Narrated by: T. Damodaran
- Cinematography: Jayanan Vincent; A. Vincent
- Edited by: K. Narayanan
- Music by: A. T. Ummer
- Release date: 24 December 1981
- Running time: 190 minutes
- Country: India
- Language: Malayalam

Ahimsa (transl. Non-violence) is a 1981 Malayalam-language political film directed by I. V. Sasi and written by T. Damodaran, starring Sukumaran, Mammootty, Ratheesh, Poornima Jayaram, Seema, Balan K. Nair, Mohanlal and Menaka in other supporting roles. The film won two Kerala State Film Awards, for Second Best Actor (Mammootty) and Best Editor (Narayanan).

== Plot ==
Talks about the Hindu-Muslim politics and conflicts in Kerala which connects with triggered by some of the feudal lords. The movie advocates the importance of non-violence.

== Cast ==
- Sukumaran as Devan
- Mammootty as Vasu
- Ratheesh as Bharathan
- Poornima Jayaram as Suma
- Menaka as Safiya
- Mohanlal as Mohan
- Lalu Alex as Raghu
- Jose Prakash as R. K.
- Balan K. Nair as Kunjutty
- Seema as Anitha
- Jose as Suresh
- Kuthiravattam Pappu as Muthu
- Achankunju as Kuttayi
- Sukumari as Nirmala, Bharathan's Mother
- Prathapachandran as Govindan
- Sathaar as Biju
- P. K. Abraham as Anitha’s father
- T. G. Ravi as Peter
- Sreenivasan as Raju
- Swapna as Radha
- K.P.A.C. Sunny as Pappan
- Kunjandi as Musliar
- Kothuku Nanappan as Sankaran
- Kunchan as Chellappan
- Kuttyedathi Vilasini as Lakshmi
- Rajyalakshmi as Sathi
- K. T. C. Abdullah as Avukkar (Hajiyar's assistant)
- Jeeva as Kuttappan
- Baskara Kurup as Hajiyar
- Rajan Padoor

== Box office ==
The film was commercial success.

== Soundtrack ==
The soundtrack features four songs, all written by Bichu Thirumala and composed by A. T. Ummer.

Song	Singer(s)	Lyrics	Duration
Kaattu tharattum	K. J. Yesudas, S. Janaki	Bichu Thirumala	
Njanoru dhobhi	K. J. Yesudas	Bichu Thirumala	
Jalasankhu pushpam	S. Janaki	Bichu Thirumala	
Sulthano	K. J. Yesudas, S. Janaki	Bichu Thirumala	
