= Mr. Michael =

Mr. Micheal
- Directed by: J. Williams
- Starring: Prem Nazir; Jose; Sreelatha Namboothiri; Zarina Wahab
- Cinematography: J. Williams
- Music by: Chakravarthy
- Production company: JW International
- Distributed by: JW International
- Release date: 25 April 1980
- Country: India
- Language: Malayalam

Mr. Micheal is a 1980 Indian Malayalam film, directed by J. Williams. The film stars Prem Nazir, Jose, Sreelatha Namboothiri and Zarina Wahab in the lead roles. The film has musical score by Chakravarthy.

== Cast ==
- Prem Nazir as Michael
- Jose as Johny
- Sreelatha Namboothiri as Rinku
- Zarina Wahab as Lilly
- Kuthiravattam Pappu as Pappu
- Seema as Shubha
- Cochin Haneefa as SP Nair
- Balan K Nair as Guru Aasan
- Sathaar as Sub Inspector
- Prathapachandran as Shuba's Uncle
- Ceylon Manohar as Manohar

== Soundtrack ==
The music was composed by Chakravarthy and the lyrics were written by yusafali & Bichu Thirumala.

No.	Song	Singers	Lyrics	Length (m:ss)
1	"Vaasantha Mandaanilan"	K. J. Yesudas, S. Janaki	Bichu Thirumala	
2	"Veenudanja Veenayil"	K. J. Yesudas	Bichu Thirumala	
3	"Naarimani Naadodi"	Jayachandran, Ambili	Yusafali	
4	"sangeetha Marathaka Haram"	Janaki	Yusafali	
5	"virinja Marlarithal"	Ambili	Yusafali	
