= Ivar (1980 film) =

- Directed by: I. V. Sasi
- Written by: Madhavi Madhav; Thoppil Bhasi (dialogues)
- Screenplay by: Thoppil Bhasi
- Produced by: M. O. Joseph
- Starring: Sharada; Seema; Sukumaran; Jose; MG Soman
- Cinematography: Jayanan Vincent
- Edited by: K. Narayanan
- Music by: G. Devarajan
- Production company: Manjilas
- Distributed by: Manjilas
- Release date: 25 January 1980
- Country: India
- Language: Malayalam

Ivar is a 1980 Indian Malayalam film, directed by I. V. Sasi and produced by M. O. Joseph. The film stars Sharada, Seema, Sukumaran and Jose in the lead roles. The film has musical score by G. Devarajan.

== Cast ==
- Sharada as Savithri/Margaret
- Seema as Lisa
- Sukumari as Mary
- Jose as Stanley
- Sankaradi as Varkey
- Raghavan as Damu
- Sathaar
- Sukumaran as Raghavan Nair
- Bahadoor as Koyaakka
- Balan K. Nair as Avaran Muthalali
- Kunchan as Porinchu
- M. G. Soman as Leslie
- Meena as Savithri's Mother
- Paravoor Bharathan as Savithri's Father
- Ravikumar as Babu
- Silk Smitha as Susamma
- Kollam G. K. Pillai

== Soundtrack ==
The music was composed by G. Devarajan and the lyrics were written by P. Bhaskaran.

No.	Song	Singers	Lyrics	Length (m:ss)
1	"Onne Onne Onne Po"	K. P. Brahmanandan, C. O. Anto, Karthikeyan, Sherin Peters	P. Bhaskaran	
2	"Vellimani Naadam"	P. Madhuri, Ambili, Chorus, C. O. Anto, Karthikeyan	P. Bhaskaran	
3	"Vindhyaparvatha Saanuvinkal"	Ambili, Karthikeyan	P. Bhaskaran	
4	"Vrischikappularithan (Bit)	Karthikeyan, Sherin Peters	P. Bhaskaran	
5	"Vrischikappularithan"	K. J. Yesudas, P. Madhuri	P. Bhaskaran	
