= Avan Oru Ahankaari =

- Directed by: K. G. Rajasekharan
- Written by: K. G. Rajasekharan
- Screenplay by: Pappanamkodu Lakshmanan
- Produced by: G. P. Balan
- Starring: Sheela; Jose Prakash; Janardanan; M. G Soman
- Cinematography: S Kumar
- Edited by: V. P. Krishnan
- Music by: M. S. Viswanathan; Lyrics: Bichu Thirumala
- Production company: Chanthamani Films
- Distributed by: Chanthamani Films
- Release date: 8 August 1980
- Country: India
- Language: Malayalam

Avan Oru Ahankaari is a 1980 Indian Malayalam film, directed by K. G. Rajasekharan and produced by G. P. Balan. The film stars Sheela, Jose Prakash, Janardanan and M. G. Soman in the lead roles. The film has musical score by M. S. Viswanathan.

== Cast ==
- Sheela
- Jose Prakash
- Janardanan
- M. G. Soman
- Master Raghu

== Soundtrack ==
The music was composed by M. S. Viswanathan.

No.	Song	Singers	Lyrics	Length (m:ss)
1	"Ammayenna Randaksharam"	Ambili	Bichu Thirumala	
2	"Ponnumkula Pookkula"	Chorus, Jolly Abraham, LR Anjali	Bichu Thirumala	
3	"Saandeepaniyude"	P. Jayachandran, Chorus	Bichu Thirumala	
