= Ira Thedunna Manushyar =

- Directed by: K. Sukumaran Nair
- Written by: Abdul Hameed
- Screenplay by: Abdul Hameed
- Starring: Madhu; Jayabharathi; Sathaar; Aranmula Ponnamma
- Cinematography: N. Karthikeyan
- Edited by: G. Venkittaraman
- Music by: G. Devarajan; Lyrics: Bichu Thirumala; Chunakkara Ramankutty
- Production company: Madeena Productions
- Distributed by: Madeena Productions
- Release date: 9 April 1981
- Country: India
- Language: Malayalam

Ira Thedunna Manushyar is a 1981 Indian Malayalam film, directed by K. Sukumaran Nair. The film stars Madhu, Jayabharathi, Sathaar and Aranmula Ponnamma in the lead roles. The film has musical score by G. Devarajan.

== Cast ==
- Madhu
- Jayabharathi
- Sathaar
- Vincent
- Aranmula Ponnamma
- K. P. A. C. Azeez
- Dhanya Vincent

== Soundtrack ==
The music was composed by G. Devarajan and the lyrics were written by Bichu Thirumala and Chunakkara Ramankutty

No.	Song	Singers	Lyrics	Length (m:ss)
1	"Hridaya Mohangal"	P. Jayachandran, P. Madhuri	Chunakkara Ramankutty	
2	"Laksham Laksham Kinavukal"	P. Madhuri	Bichu Thirumala	
3	"Meesha Indian Meesha"	K. J. Yesudas	Chunakkara Ramankutty	
4	"Sugandha Sheethala"	Vani Jairam	Bichu Thirumala	
