= Asthamikkatha Pakalukal =

- Directed by: A. Sheriff
- Written by: A. Sheriff
- Screenplay by: A. Sheriff
- Produced by: Kurian Varnasala
- Starring: Prem Nazir; Jose; Sankaradi; Sukumaran
- Cinematography: E. N. Balakrishnan
- Edited by: G. Venkittaraman
- Music by: A. T. Ummer
- Production company: Varnasala
- Distributed by: Dinny Release
- Release date: 12 March 1981
- Country: India
- Language: Malayalam

Asthamikkatha Pakalukal is a 1981 Indian Malayalam film, directed by A. Sheriff and produced by Kurian Varnasala. The film stars Prem Nazir, Jose, Sankaradi and Sukumaran in the lead roles. The film has musical score by A. T. Ummer.

== Cast ==
- Prem Nazir
- Jose
- Sankaradi
- Sukumaran
- Aboobacker
- Ambika
- K. P. Ummer
- Kuthiravattam Pappu
- Meena
- Bhaskaran Variyathuvalappil

== Soundtrack ==
The music was composed by A. T. Ummer and the lyrics were written by Sathyan Anthikkad.

No.	Song	Singers	Lyrics	Length (m:ss)
1	"Dukhathin"	K. J. Yesudas	Sathyan Anthikkad	
2	"Ithirippoovinu"	S. Janaki	Sathyan Anthikkad	
3	"Maanathu Maarivil Poovirinju"	K. J. Yesudas, Ambili	Sathyan Anthikkad	
