= Padmatheertham =

- Directed by: K. G. Rajasekharan
- Written by: Sreemoolanagaram Vijayan
- Starring: Jayabharathi; Jose; Jose Prakash; Unnimary
- Cinematography: P. S. Nivas
- Music by: K. V. Mahadevan
- Release date: 30 June 1978
- Country: India
- Language: Malayalam

Padmatheertham is a 1978 Indian Malayalam-language film, directed by K. G. Rajasekharan. The film stars Jayabharathi, Jose, Jose Prakash and Unnimary. The film has musical score by K. V. Mahadevan.

== Cast ==
- Jayabharathi as Malini
- Jose as Venu
- Jose Prakash as Achutha Kurup
- Unnimary as Lathika
- M. G. Soman as Karunan
- Sathaar as Muralidharan
- Prema as Madhaviyamma
- KPAC Lalitha as Meenakshi
- Alummoodan as Krishna Pilla
- Nellikode Bhaskaran as Alikutty
- Thrissur Elsy as Saramma/Malini's friend
- Philomina as Amina
- Usharani as Jameela
- Kunchan as Rameshan
- Bhagyalakshmi as Bharathikutty
- Poojappura Ravi as Prabhakaran
- Radhadevi as Lathika's mother
- Sremoolam Vijayan as Sankara Pilla
- Sam as Janardhanan

== Soundtrack ==
The music was composed by K. V. Mahadevan with lyrics by Mankombu Gopalakrishnan.

| No. | Song | Singers | Lyrics | Length (m:ss) |
|---|---|---|---|---|
| 1 | "Kaarum Karutha Vavum" | Kanjangad Ramachandran | Mankombu Gopalakrishnan | |
| 2 | "Kaarum Karutha Vavum" | K. J. Yesudas | Mankombu Gopalakrishnan | |
| 3 | "Kaarum Karutha Vavum" (F) | Ambili | Mankombu Gopalakrishnan | |
| 4 | "Mahendrahariyude" | K. J. Yesudas | Mankombu Gopalakrishnan | |
| 5 | "Samayam Saayam Sandhya" | Vani Jairam | Mankombu Gopalakrishnan | |
| 6 | "Somatheerthamaadunna" | K. J. Yesudas | Mankombu Gopalakrishnan | |
| 7 | "Thinkalkkala Choodiya" | P. Jayachandran, Ambili | Mankombu Gopalakrishnan | |
