= Soothrakkaari =

- Directed by: Rochy Alex
- Written by: Mrs. J. C. Prakash (dialogues)
- Screenplay by: Prakash
- Starring: Vincent; Jayan; Jose; Sukumaran; Unnimary
- Cinematography: N. Karthikeyan
- Edited by: K. Rajagopal
- Music by: A. T. Ummer; Lyrics: Bichu Thirumala
- Production company: Santhosh Film Arts
- Distributed by: Santhosh Film Arts
- Release date: 11 August 1978
- Country: India
- Language: Malayalam

Soothrakkaari is a 1978 Indian Malayalam film, directed by Rochy Alex. The film stars Vincent, Jayan, Jose, Sukumaran and Unnimary in the lead roles. The film's musical score was composed by A. T. Ummer.

== Cast ==
- Vincent
- Jayan
- Jose
- Sukumaran
- Seema
- Unnimary
- Sukumari
- T. P. Madhavan
- Prathapachandran
- Manavalan Joseph

== Soundtrack ==
The music was composed by A. T. Ummer and the lyrics were written by Bichu Thirumala.

No.	Song	Singers	Lyrics	Length (m:ss)
1	"Ekaanthathayil"	S. Janaki	Bichu Thirumala	
2	"Excursion"	Ambili	Bichu Thirumala	
3	"Sukhavaasa Mandiram"	K. J. Yesudas	Bichu Thirumala	
4	"Vellappalunkotha"	K. J. Yesudas, S. Janaki	Bichu Thirumala	
