= Njaan Njaan Maathram =

- Directed by: I. V. Sasi
- Written by: John Paul; Thoppil Bhasi (dialogues)
- Screenplay by: Thoppil Bhasi
- Produced by: M. O. Joseph
- Starring: Madhu; Jayabharathi; Jose; Sheela
- Cinematography: Ashok Kumar
- Edited by: K. Narayanan
- Music by: G. Devarajan
- Production company: Manjilas
- Distributed by: Manjilas
- Release date: 30 November 1979
- Country: India
- Language: Malayalam
- Box office: This movie was a Commercial and Critical Success. It was one of the highest grossing Malayalam movie of 1979

Njaan Njaan Maathram is a 1979 Indian Malayalam-language film, directed by I. V. Sasi and produced by M. O. Joseph. The film stars Madhu, Sheela, Jose and Jayabharathi in the lead roles.

== Cast ==
- Madhu as Chandhran Pilla
- Jayabharathi as Devu
- Jose
- Sankaradi
- Aranmula Ponnamma
- Bahadoor
- Kuthiravattam Pappu
- M. G. Soman
- N. Govindankutty
- Seema as Jaanu
- Sheela as Soudamini

== Soundtrack ==
The music was composed by G. Devarajan with lyrics written by P. Bhaskaran.

No.	Song	Singers	Lyrics	Length (m:ss)
1	"Kanakamanichilambu"	P. Susheela	P. Bhaskaran	
2	"Maanathe Pookkadamukkil"	K. J. Yesudas, P. Madhuri	P. Bhaskaran	
3	"Manushyanu"	K. J. Yesudas	P. Bhaskaran	
4	"Nirangal"	K. J. Yesudas	P. Bhaskaran	
5	"Rajanigandhikal"	K. J. Yesudas	P. Bhaskaran	
