= Urakkam Varaatha Raathrikal =

- Directed by: M. Krishnan Nair
- Written by: Sunitha; Nedukunnam Joseph (dialogues)
- Screenplay by: Nedukunnam Joseph
- Produced by: M. Mani
- Starring: Madhu; KPAC Lalitha; Jose; Jose Prakash
- Cinematography: Vipin Das
- Music by: Shyam; Lyrics: Bichu Thirumala
- Production company: Sunitha Productions
- Distributed by: Sunitha Productions
- Release date: 23 September 1978
- Country: India
- Language: Malayalam

Urakkam Varaatha Raathrikal is a 1978 Indian Malayalam film, directed by M. Krishnan Nair and produced by M. Mani. The film stars Madhu, KPAC Lalitha, Jose and Jose Prakash in the lead roles. The film has musical score by Shyam.

== Cast ==
- Madhu as Jayan
- KPAC Lalitha
- Jose as Venu
- Jose Prakash
- Manavalan Joseph
- Kunchan
- Reena as Malathy
- Seema as Kavitha

== Soundtrack ==
The music was composed by Shyam and the lyrics were written by Bichu Thirumala.

No.	Song	Singers	Lyrics	Length (m:ss)
1	"Naadakam Jeevitham"	K. J. Yesudas	Bichu Thirumala	
2	"Thiramaala Thedunnu"	S. Janaki	Bichu Thirumala	
3	"Urakkam Varaatha Raathrikal"	K. J. Yesudas, Vijaya Benedict	Bichu Thirumala	
