= Ithrayum Kaalam =

- Directed by: I. V. Sasi
- Written by: T. Damodaran
- Screenplay by: T. Damodaran
- Produced by: N. G. John
- Starring: Madhu; Mammootty; Ratheesh; Seema
- Cinematography: Jayanan Vincent
- Edited by: K. Narayanan
- Music by: Shyam
- Production company: Shabana- Dayana
- Distributed by: Shabana- Dayana
- Release date: 12 February 1987
- Country: India
- Language: Malayalam

Ithrayum Kaalam is a 1987 Indian Malayalam film, directed by I. V. Sasi and produced by N. G. John. The film stars Madhu, Mammootty, Ratheesh and Seema in the lead roles. The film has musical score by Shyam.

== Cast ==
- Madhu as Chackochen Muthalali
- Mammootty as Varghese Chacko
- Ratheesh as Mathukutty Chacko
- Lalu Alex as Alex Chacko
- Jose as James Chacko
- Rahman as Pappachan Paily
- Shankar as Sulaiman
- T. G. Ravi as Paili
- Shobhana as Savithri Thamburatti
- Seema as Anna Mathukutty
- Manavalan Joseph as Meledathu Kurup
- Bahadoor as Khaader
- Sankaradi as Ayalkunnam Maani
- Prathapachandran as Valiya Thirumeni
- Sathaar as Krishnankutty
- Anjali Naidu as Sherly Alex
- Balan K. Nair as Kunjankutty Hajiyar
- Maniyanpilla Raju as Unni Thirumeni
- Thrissur Elsy
- Bheeman Raghu as Goon
- Kundara Johnny as Raaju
- Kuthiravattam Pappu as Shankunni Nair
- Nanditha Bose as Mariya Paily
- Sabitha Anand as Sainaba
- Meghanathan as Kunjumon
- Soorya as Ambujam
- Kalaranjini as Mollykutty James
- Sonia as Young Savithri
- Kannur Sreelatha as Sreedevi Thamburatti
- Surekha as Saraswathi Thamburatti
- Thodupuzha Vasanthi as Ammukutty Nair

== Soundtrack ==
The music was composed by Shyam and the lyrics were written by Yusufali Kechery.

=== Track listing ===
No.	Song	Singers	Lyrics	Length (m:ss)
1	"Madhumadhuram"	Krishnachandran, Lathika	Yusufali Kechery	
2	"Mannaanithu"	Krishnachandran, Lathika	Yusufali Kechery	
3	"Sarasa Sringaarame"	P. Jayachandran, Unni Menon, Jolly Abraham, Lathika	Yusufali Kechery	
