= Kannaram Pothi Pothi =

Kannarum Pothi Pothi
- Poster
- Directed by: Hassan
- Written by: A. Sheriff
- Screenplay by: A. Sheriff
- Produced by: Subramaniyam
- Starring: Madhu; Srividya; Rasheed Ummer; Sathaar
- Cinematography: J. Williams
- Edited by: K. P. Hariharaputhran
- Music by: A. T. Ummer
- Production company: Sakthi Cine Creations
- Distributed by: Sakthi Cine Creations
- Release date: 8 May 1985
- Country: India
- Language: Malayalam

Kannarum Pothi Pothi is a 1985 Indian Malayalam film, directed by Hassan and produced by Subramaniyam. The film stars Madhu, Srividya, Rasheed Ummer and Sathaar in the lead roles. The film has musical score by A. T. Ummer.

== Cast ==
- Madhu as Public Prosecutor Karunakaran
- Srividya as Bhavani
- Rasheed Ummer as Suresh
- Sathaar as Chandran
- Ashwini as Lakshmi
- Bheeman Raghu as Vasu
- Paravoor Bharathan as Murali

== Soundtrack ==
The music was composed by A. T. Ummer and the lyrics were written by P. Bhaskaran.

No.	Song	Singers	Lyrics	Length (m:ss)
1	"Kaaverippuzha"	K. J. Yesudas, K. S. Chithra	P. Bhaskaran	
2	"Mazhayomazha"	K. J. Yesudas, K. S. Chithra	P. Bhaskaran	
