= Mazhakaaru =

- Directed by: P. N. Menon
- Screenplay by: Thoppil Bhasi
- Based on: Mazhakaaru by G. Vivekanandan
- Produced by: S. K. Nair
- Starring: Madhu; Kanakadurga; Roja Ramani (Sobhana); KPAC Lalitha
- Cinematography: Ashok Kumar
- Edited by: Ravi
- Music by: G. Devarajan
- Production company: New India Films
- Release date: 3 August 1973
- Country: India
- Language: Malayalam

Mazhakaaru is a 1973 Indian Malayalam-language film, directed by P. N. Menon and produced by S. K. Nair. The film stars Madhu, Kanakadurga, Roja Ramani (Sobhana) and KPAC Lalitha. It is based on the novel of the same name by G. Vivekanandan.

== Cast ==
- Madhu as Prabhakaran
- Kanakadurga as Malathi
- Roja Ramani (Sobhana) as Shantha
- KPAC Lalitha as Meenakshi
- Sankaradi as Swami
- Raghavan
- Adoor Bhavani as Malathi's Mother
- Baby Sheela
- Balan K. Nair
- Janardanan as Soman
- Kottarakkara Sreedharan Nair
- Kuthiravattam Pappu as Maniyan
- M. G. Soman
- Madhubala
- P. K. Venukkuttan Nair
- P. O. Thomas
- P. R. Menon
- Radhadevi
- Xavier
- Valsala
- Meera
- Anitha

== Soundtrack ==
The music was composed by G. Devarajan and the lyrics were written by Vayalar Ramavarma.

Song	Singers
"Anasooye Priyamvade"	P. Madhuri
"Maninaagathirunaaga"	P. Jayachandran, P. Madhuri
"Pralayapayodhiyil"	K. J. Yesudas
"Vaikkathappanum Sivaraathri"	M. G. Radhakrishnan, Chorus
