= Loose Loose Arappiri Loose =

- Directed by: Prassi Malloor
- Screenplay by: Prassi Malloor
- Story by: Mohankumar
- Produced by: Jayamohan; Prassi Malloor
- Starring: Jagathy Sreekumar; Mala Aravindan; Kuthiravattam Pappu; Pattom Sadan
- Cinematography: V. E. Gopinath
- Music by: Darsan Raman
- Production company: Bright Film Corporation
- Distributed by: Bright Release
- Release date: 17 June 1988
- Country: India
- Language: Malayalam

Loose Loose Arappiri Loose (transl. Crazy Crazy Little Crazy) is a 1988 Indian Malayalam-language comedy film written, co-produced, and directed by Prassi Malloor. Starring Jagathy Sreekumar, Mala Aravindan, Kuthiravattam Pappu and Pattom Sadan. The film has a musical score by Darsan Raman.

== Cast ==
- Jagathy Sreekumar as Jagathy
- Mala Aravindan as Mala
- Kuthiravattam Pappu as Pappu
- Pattom Sadan
- K. P. A. C. Azeez
- Murali
- Babitha
- Bindu Ghosh
- Justin
- Loose Mohan
- Nellikode Bhaskaran
- Sabitha Anand
- Vettoor Purushan as Purushan

== Soundtrack ==
The music was composed by Darsan Raman and the lyrics were written by P. Bhaskaran.

No.	Song	Singers	Lyrics	Length (m:ss)
1	"Chakravarthini" (Parody)	Satheesh Babu, Vincent Gomes	P. Bhaskaran	
2	"Kallanmaare"	K. J. Yesudas, Balagopalan Thampi, Vincent Gomes	P. Bhaskaran	
3	"Vasantha Rajaneepushpam"	Vani Jairam	P. Bhaskaran	
