= Vidhichathum Kothichathum =

- Poster
- Directed by: T. S. Mohan
- Written by: T. S. Mohan
- Screenplay by: T. S. Mohan
- Produced by: T. S. Mohan
- Starring: Mammootty; Adoor Bhasi; Jose; Krishnachandran
- Cinematography: B.R. Ramakrishna
- Edited by: Balan
- Music by: Raveendran
- Production company: Vimal Pictures
- Release date: 17 September 1982
- Country: India
- Language: Malayalam

Vidhichathum Kothichathum is a 1982 Indian Malayalam-language film, directed and produced by T. S. Mohan. The film stars Vincent, Vijayan, Mammootty, Adoor Bhasi, Jose and Krishnachandran . The film has musical score by Raveendran.

== Cast ==
- Vincent
- Vijayan
- Mammootty (Dubbed by Sreenivasan)
- Lalu Alex as Suresh
- Adoor Bhasi
- Jose
- Krishnachandran
- Ratheesh
- Sathaar
- Adoor Bhavani
- G. K. Pillai
- Kundara Johny
- Ranipadmini

== Soundtrack ==
The music was composed by Raveendran and the lyrics were written by Poovachal Khader.

No.	Song	Singers	Lyrics	Length (m:ss)
1	"Ellupaadam" (Neelamizhiyaal)	K. J. Yesudas, Raveendran, Jency	Poovachal Khader	
2	"Idavaakkaayalin"	K. J. Yesudas	Poovachal Khader	
3	"Manjaadikkilikkudilum"	K. J. Yesudas, Lathika	Poovachal Khader	
4	"Olam Maatti Mumbe Poyi"	K. J. Yesudas	Poovachal Khader	
5	"Shaanthaakaaram"	Raveendran, Lathika		
