= Poojakkedukkatha Pookkal =

- Directed by: N. Sankaran Nair
- Written by: N. Mohanan; Thoppil Bhasi (dialogues)
- Screenplay by: Thoppil Bhasi
- Produced by: Prem Navas; Sobhana Parameswaran Nair
- Starring: Madhu; Sheela; Jagathy Sreekumar; Adoor Bhasi
- Cinematography: J. Williams
- Edited by: M. S. Mani
- Music by: K. Raghavan
- Production company: Sobhana Prem Combines
- Distributed by: Sobhana Prem Combines
- Release date: 29 April 1977
- Country: India
- Language: Malayalam

Poojakkedukkatha Pookkal is a 1977 Indian Malayalam-language film, directed by N. Sankaran Nair and produced by Prem Navas and Sobhana Parameswaran Nair. The film stars Madhu, Sheela, Jagathy Sreekumar and Adoor Bhasi. The film's score was composed by K. Raghavan.

== Cast ==
- Madhu
- Sheela
- Jagathy Sreekumar
- Adoor Bhasi
- Prem Nawas
- Unnimary
- Bahadoor
- Mallika Sukumaran
- P. K. Venukkuttan Nair

== Soundtrack ==
The music was composed by K. Raghavan with lyrics by P. Bhaskaran and Swathi Thirunal.

No.	Song	Singers	Lyrics	Length (m:ss)
1	"Kannante Kavilil Nin Sindoora Thilakatthin"	M. Balamuralikrishna	P. Bhaskaran	
2	"Kshethramethennariyaatha Theerthayaathra"	K. P. Brahmanandan	P. Bhaskaran	
3	"Nabhassil Mukilinte"	M. Balamuralikrishna	P. Bhaskaran	
4	"Navayugadinakaran"	Ambili, Padmini Warrier	P. Bhaskaran	
5	"Paahimaadhava"	P. Susheela, Chorus	P. Bhaskaran	
6	"Rajanee Kadambam Pookkum"	Ambili, Padmini Warrier	P. Bhaskaran	
7	"Saarasaaksha Paripaalayamaamayi"	M. Balamuralikrishna, Chorus	Swathi Thirunal	
