= Paadasaram =

- Directed by: A.N. Thampi
- Written by: R. Harikumar; G. Gopalakrishnan (dialogues)
- Screenplay by: G. Gopalakrishnan
- Produced by: Sivan Kunnampilly
- Starring: Jose; Shobha; Raji; T. G. Ravi
- Cinematography: T. N. Krishnankutty Nair
- Edited by: G. Venkittaraman
- Music by: G. Devarajan
- Production company: Thushara Movie Makers
- Distributed by: Thushara Movie Makers
- Release date: 1 December 1978
- Country: India
- Language: Malayalam

Paadasaram is a 1978 Indian Malayalam-language film, directed by A.N. Thampi and produced by Sivan Kunnampilly. The film stars Jose, Shobha, Raji and T. G. Ravi. The film has musical score by G. Devarajan.

== Cast ==
- Jose as Rameshan
- Shobha as Shoba
- Raji as Thulasi
- T. G. Ravi as Ravi
- Kaviyoor Ponnamma as Kamalakshi
- P. J. Antony as Pulluvan
- Aranmula Ponnamma as Bhavani
- Baby Sangeetha as Omana
- Kottarakkara Sreedharan Nair as Poomangalathu Unnithan
- Kuthiravattam Pappu
- Santha Devi as Pulluvathi Kochukaali

== Soundtrack ==
The music was composed by G. Devarajan with lyrics by G. K. Pallath, G. Gopalakrishnan and A. P. Gopalan.

No.	Song	Singers	Lyrics	Length (m:ss)
1	"Illapparambile"	P. Madhuri	G. K. Pallath	
2	"Kaattu Vannu Ninte Kamukan Vannu"	P. Jayachandran	G. K. Pallath	
3	"Kattakkaarveni Soonu Vinayakan" (Pulluvan Paattu)	Karthikeyan, Dhanya, Uma Maheswari		
4	"Mohaveena Than"	P. Susheela	G. Gopalakrishnan	
5	"Ushasse"	K. J. Yesudas	A. P. Gopalan	
