= Kaavalmaadam =

- Directed by: P. Chandrakumar
- Written by: Dr. Balakrishnan
- Screenplay by: Dr. Balakrishnan
- Story by: Kamal (director)
- Starring: Jose; Ambika; K. P. Ummer; Kuthiravattam Pappu
- Cinematography: Vasanth Kumar
- Edited by: G. Venkittaraman
- Music by: A. T. Ummer
- Production company: Santhosh Films
- Distributed by: Santhosh Films
- Release date: 18 April 1980
- Country: India
- Language: Malayalam

Kaavalmaadam is a 1980 Indian Malayalam film, directed by P. Chandrakumar. The film stars Jose, Ambika, K. P. Ummer and Kuthiravattam Pappu in the lead roles. The film has musical score by A. T. Ummer.

== Cast ==
- Jose as Ramu
- Ambika as Malli
- K. P. Ummer as Kollapanikker
- Kuthiravattam Pappu as Kunjali
- Mala Aravindan as Rappai
- Sukumaran as Rajasekharan Thampi
- Sukumari as Pathumma
- Praveena as Kurathi Valli
- Suchithra (old) as Raji
- Sathyachitra as valli

== Soundtrack ==
The music was composed by A. T. Ummer and the lyrics were written by Sathyan Anthikkad.

No.	Song	Singers	Lyrics	Length (m:ss)
1	"Akkare Ninnoru"	P. Jayachandran	Sathyan Anthikkad	
2	"Ponnaaryan Paadam Poothu"	K. J. Yesudas	Sathyan Anthikkad	
3	"Theyyam Theyyam Theyyannam Paadi"	K. J. Yesudas	Sathyan Anthikkad	
4	"Vayanaadan Kulirinte"	S. Janaki, Vani Jairam	Sathyan Anthikkad	
