= Avar Jeevikkunnu =

1978 film

- Directed by: P. G. Vishwambharan
- Written by: N. Govindankutty
- Screenplay by: N. Govindankutty
- Starring: Madhu; Jayabharathi; Thikkurissy Sukumaran Nair; Sreelatha Namboothiri
- Cinematography: J. G. Vijayam
- Edited by: V. P. Krishnan
- Music by: G. Devarajan
- Production company: Sreevardhini Films
- Distributed by: Sreevardhini Films
- Release date: 31 August 1978
- Country: India
- Language: Malayalam

Avar Jeevikkunnu is a 1978 Indian Malayalam-language film, directed by P. G. Vishwambharan. The film stars Madhu, Jayabharathi, Thikkurissy Sukumaran Nair and Sreelatha Namboothiri. The film has musical score by G. Devarajan.

== Cast ==
- Madhu
- Jayabharathi
- Thikkurissy Sukumaran Nair
- Sreelatha Namboothiri
- Sathaar
- Aranmula Ponnamma
- N. Govindankutty
- Santha Devi
- Veeran

== Soundtrack ==
The music was composed by G. Devarajan and the lyrics were written by Yusufali Kechery.

| No. | Song | Singers | Lyrics | Length (m:ss) |
|---|---|---|---|---|
| 1 | "Enne Nee Ariyumo" | P. Madhuri | Yusufali Kechery | |
| 2 | "Marakkaan Kazhiyaatha" | K. J. Yesudas | Yusufali Kechery | |
| 3 | "Nrithakala Deviyo" | P. Jayachandran, P. Madhuri | Yusufali Kechery | |
| 4 | "Sandhyaa Raagam" | P. Madhuri, Karthikeyan | Yusufali Kechery | |
