= Nellikode Bhaskaran =

Indian actor (1924–1988)

- Born: Bhaskara Menon; 21 April 1924; Nellikode (Kozhikode)
- Died: 11 August 1988 (aged 64)
- Occupation: Actor

Nellikode Bhaskaran (21 April 1924 – 11 August 1988) was an Indian actor in Malayalam movies. His real name was Bhaskara Menon. He mostly played supporting and character roles.

== Awards ==
Kerala State Film Awards:

- Second Best Actor – 1972 – Maram
- Second Best Actor – 1979 – Sarapancharam

== Filmography ==
Movie	year	Role
Kadathanadan Ambadi	1990	Released Delayed
Nagarangalil Chennu Raparkam	1989	Released Delayed
Loose Loose Arappiri Loose	1988	
Janma Sathru	1988	Nanu Pilla
Marikkunnila Njan	1988	
Kulambadikal	1986	
Njan Kathorthirikkum	1986	
Angadikkappurathu	1985	Nambiar
Sandharbham	1984	
Thacholi Thankappan	1984	Nair
Velichamillatha Veedhi	1984	
Pallanguzhi	1983	
Arabikkadal	1983	
Bandham	1983	
Iniyenkilum	1983	
Prashnam Gurutharam	1983	
Surumayitta Kannukal	1983	
Kaathirunna Divasam	1983	Station Master
Ponmudy	1982	Bhaskaran
Mazhu	1982	
Kanmanikkorumma	1982	
Ethiralikal	1982	Madhavan
John Jaffar Janardhanan	1982	
Chambalkadu	1982	
Pooviriyum Pulari	1982	
Sooryan	1982	
Mylanji	1982	Kunjikochu Musaliyar
Ee Nadu	1982	Gopalan
Thusharam	1981	
Swapnaragam	1981	
Swarna Pakshikal	1981	
Oothi Kachiya Ponnu	1981	
Lava	1980	Gopalan
Adhikaram	1980	Moithukka
Anthapuram	1980	
Muthuchippikal	1980	Paulose
Meen	1980	
Vilkkanundu Swapnangal	1980	Achuthan Nair
Maalika Paniyunnavar	1979	
Veerabhadran	1979	
Maamaankam	1979	Koya
Aarattu	1979	
Kannukal	1979	Madhavan
Lajjaavathi	1979	Lelam Pilla
Sarapanjaram	1979	
Papathinu Maranamilla	1979	
Manavadharmam	1979	
Anu Pallavi	1979	
Avalude Prathikaram	1979	
Prabhu	1979	
Mannu	1978	Communist Party of India Activist
Mukkuvane Snehicha Bhootham	1978	Keshavan
Kanyaka	1978	Raman Nair
Bhaaryayum Kaamukiyum	1978	
Tharoo Oru Janmam Koodi	1978	
Theerangal	1978	
Lisa	1978	
Padmatheertham	1978	Alikutty
Kaathirunna Nimisham	1978	Venu's father
Mudramothiram	1978	Bheeran
Itha Oru Manushyan	1978	Chathan Pulayan
Ivanente Priya Puthran	1977	
Mininol	1977	
Shankupushpam	1977	Veeran
Sneham	1977	
Sangamam	1977	
Yatheem	1977	Sakkath Mammad
Pattalam Janaki	1977	
Saritha	1977	
Panchami	1976	Kunjunni
Amrithavaahini	1976	Paramu Nair
Kanyaadaanam	1976	
Rajayogam	1976	
Themmadi Velappan	1976	Velu
Chottanikkara Amma	1976	
Niramala	1975	
Penpada	1975	Gurukkal
Cheenavala	1975	
Thamara Thoni	1975	
Maram	1973	Aymutti
Ananda Shayannam	1972	
Miss Mary	1972	David
Azhimukham	1972	
Mappusakshi	1972	
Ummachu	1971	Beeran
Marunattil Oru Malayali	1971	
Makane Ninakku Vendi	1971	Chandikunju
Manpeda	1971	
Poompatta	1971	Vaidyar
Inquilab Sindabad	1971	
Achante Bharya	1971	Gopi
C.I.D. Nazir	1971	Raju M.A
Jalaknyaka	1971	
Nadhi	1970	Chacko
Madhuvidhu	1970	Bhaskara Panikkar
Kurukshethram	1970	
Nizhalattam	1970	
Olavum Theeravum	1970	
Nazhikakkallu	1970	
Thurakkatha Vaathil	1970	Mullakka
Urangatha Sundari	1969	Purushothaman
Veetu Mrigam	1969	
Virunnukari	1969	Raman Nair
Nadhi	1969	Chacko
Kannur Deluxe	1969	Bus Conductor
Manaswini	1968	
Thulabharam	1968	Aliyar
Viplavakarikal	1968	
Hotel High Range	1968	
Kadal	1968	Lopez
Thokkukal Kadha Parayunne	1968	
Ezhu Ratharikal	1968	Kumaran
Mainatheruvi Kolacase	1967	
Mulkireedam	1967	
Pathirapattu	1967	
Udhyogastha	1967	
Chithramela	1967	
Ramanan	1967	Ramu
Manikyakottaram	1966	
Sthanarthi Saramma	1966	Mathai
Pakalkkinavu	1966	
Kavyamela	1965	Balachandran
Pattuthoovaala	1965	Maani
Kattupookkal	1965	Annamma's brother
Murappennu	1965	Veerankutty
Ore Bhoomi Ore Raktham	1964	
Doctor	1963	Kumaran
Moodupadam	1963	
Kadalamma	1963	
Kalpadukal	1962	
Bharya	1962	
Kandam Becha Kottu	1961	Hassan
