= Swandam Enna Padam =

Swantham Enna Padam
- Directed by: Sreekumaran Thampi
- Written by: Sreekumaran Thampi
- Screenplay by: Sreekumaran Thampi
- Produced by: P. K. Kaimal
- Starring: Madhu; Srividya; Sukumari; Jose
- Cinematography: Anandakuttan
- Edited by: K. Narayanan
- Music by: Shyam
- Production company: Thirumeni Pictures
- Distributed by: Thirumeni Pictures
- Release date: 2 October 1980
- Country: India
- Language: Malayalam

Swantham Enna Padam is a 1980 Indian Malayalam film, directed by Sreekumaran Thampi and produced by P. K. Kaimal. The film stars Madhu, Srividya, Sukumari and Jose in the lead roles. The film has a musical score by Shyam. Parts of the movie were shot on location in Kashmir, thereby becoming the first Malayalam movie to do so.

== Cast ==
- Madhu
- Srividya
- Sukumari
- Jose
- Sankaradi
- Ambika
- Kuthiravattam Pappu
- Master Rajakumaran Thampi
- Meena
- Raveendran

== Soundtrack ==
The music was composed by Shyam and the lyrics were written by Sreekumaran Thampi.

No.	Song	Singers	Lyrics	Length (m:ss)
1	"Aarambhamevide"	K. J. Yesudas, S. Janaki	Sreekumaran Thampi	
2	"Koonaamkuttiye Chakkarakkuttiye"	K. J. Yesudas, Vani Jairam	Sreekumaran Thampi	
3	"Nirangalil Neeraadunna Bhoomi"	P. Jayachandran, Vani Jairam	Sreekumaran Thampi	
4	"Raagangal Than Raagam"	S. Janaki, Chorus	Sreekumaran Thampi	
5	"Sandhyayaam Makalorungi"	K. J. Yesudas	Sreekumaran Thampi	
6	"Sarvamangala Maangalye" (Bit)	P. Jayachandran		
