= Jose (actor) =

Indian actor in Malayalam movies

Jose Kurian
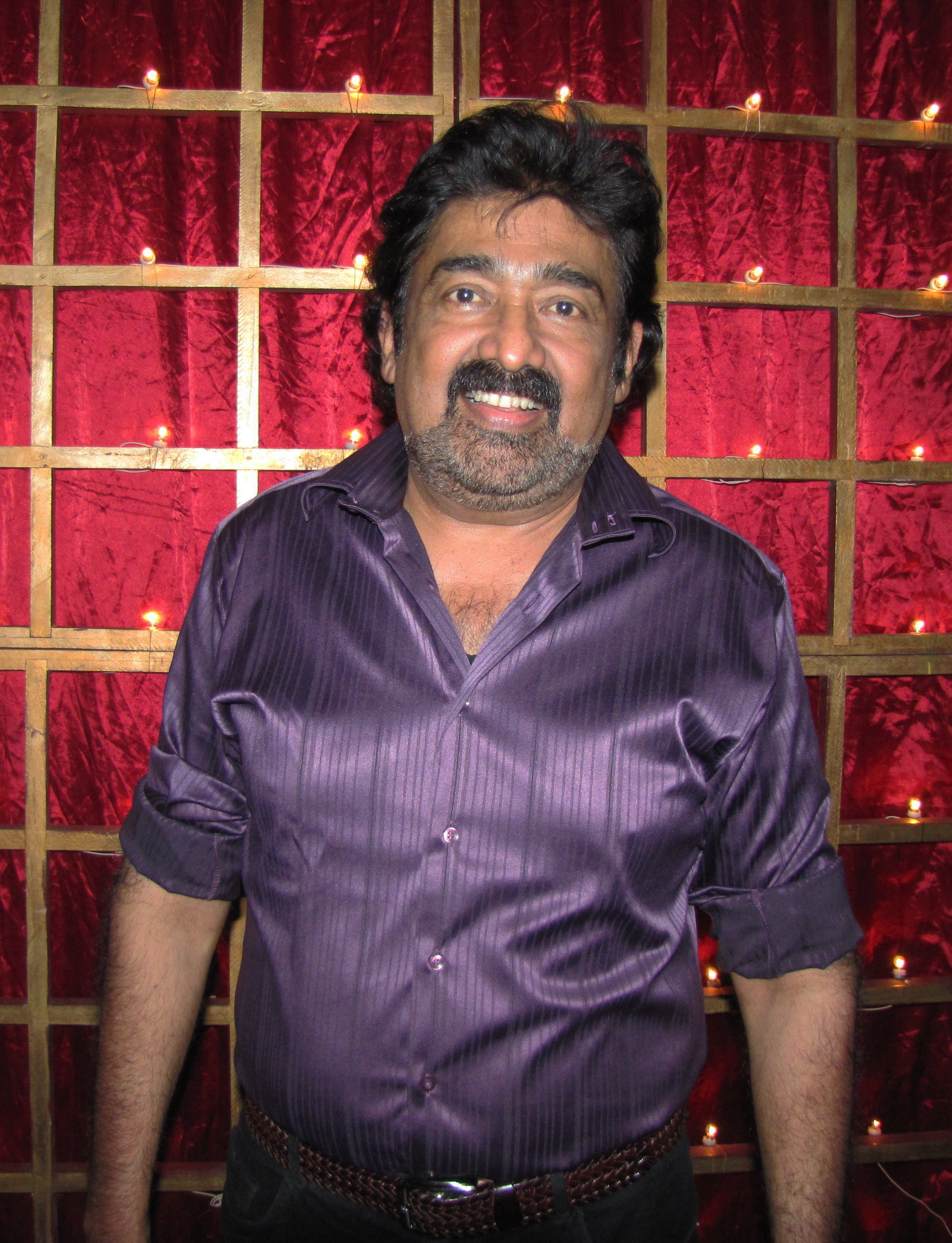
- Born: Kochi
- Occupation: Film actor
- Years active: 1977–present
- Spouse: Susan Jose

Jose Kurian is an Indian actor in Malayalam movies. He was a romantic hero in early eighties. He has acted in about 100 films.

== Background ==
Jose Kurian was born in Kochi. He made his debut through Dweepu in 1977. His role in Meen and song "Ullasapoothirikal" alongside Ambika was well noted. He left the movie industry in the late 1980s. He came back to the industry with a 2014 Malayalam movie named Salalah Mobiles.

== Personal life ==
He is married to Susan Jose. His daughter Pranathi was a former actress. He had his high school and college education from St. Albert's High School and St. Albert's College, Ernakulam respectively.

== Filmography ==
Year	Title	Role	Notes
1977	Dweepu	Chandran	
1977	Sangamam		
1977	Samudram	Ravi	
1978	Seemanthini		
1978	Kudumbam Namukku Sreekovil		
1978	Beena	Venugopal	
1978	Aanappaachan	Suresh	
1978	Padmatheertham	Venu	
1978	Soothrakkaari		
1978	Njaan Njaan Maathram		
1978	Urakkam Varaatha Raathrikal	Venu	
1978	Rappadikalude Gatha		
1978	Paadasaram	Rameshan	
1978	Iniyum Puzhayozhukum	Alex	
1979	Allauddinum Albhutha Vilakkum	Aboobakkar	
1979	Enikku Njaan Swantham	Mohan	
1979	Vaaleduthaven Vaalaal		
1979	Prabhaathasandhya		
1979	Aval Niraparaadhi		
1979	Aarattu	Joyi	
1979	Ishtapraaneshwari	Rajan	
1979	Rakthamillatha Manushyan	Baby	
1979	Ente Sneham Ninakku Maathram		
1979	Vijayam Nammude Senani		
1979	Ezhunirangal		
1979	Iniyethra Sandhyakal		
1980	Andharangam Oomaiyanathu		Tamil film
1980	Makara Vilakku		
1980	Rajaneegandhi	Murali	
1980	Ishtamanu Pakshe		
1980	Ivar	Stanley	
1980	Dwik Vijayam	Ravi	
1980	Kaavalmaadam	Ramu	
1980	Kalika		
1980	Hridhayam Paadunnu		
1980	Swandam Enna Padam		
1980	Meen		
1980	Mr. Michael	Johny	
1980	Eden Thottam		
1980	Ammayum Makalum	Raju	
1980	Esthappan		
1980	Angadi	Haneefa	
1981	Swarangal Swapnagal	Ravi	
1981	Asthamikkatha Pakalukal		
1981	Thushaaram	Cap. Vijayan Menon	
1981	Aambal Poovu		
1981	Ahimsa	Suresh	
1982	Ayiram Muthangal	Visu	Tamil film
1982	Mukhangal	Ravi	
1982	Angachamayam		
1982	Vidhichathum Kothichathum		
1982	Marmaram	Devan	
1983	Kaivarisai		
1983	Ee Vazhi Mathram		
1984	Kooduthedunna Parava	Salim	
1984	Sandarbham		
1984	NH 47	Alikunju	
1984	Umaanilayam	Rajan	
1984	Piriyilla Naam		
1985	Nayakan	Prem	
1985	Thammil Thammil	Dr. Prasad	
1985	Oru Sandesam Koodi	Unnikrishnan	
1985	Njan Piranna Nattil		
1986	Pappan Priyappetta Pappan	Umesh	
1986	Ente Shabdham	Vijay	
1986	Shobhraj		
1986	Katturumbinum Kathu Kuthu	Prashobhan K. Pilla	
1986	Oraayiram Ormakal		
1987	Aankiliyude Tharattu		
1987	Irupatham Noottandu	Santhosh	
1987	Ithente Neethi		
1987	Ithrayum Kaalam	James Chacko	
1987	Oru Sindoora Pottinte Ormaykku	Dr. Joy	
1988	1921	Gopy	
1988	Moonnam Mura	Dr. Hameed	
1988	Oru Muthassi Katha	Bapputty	
1989	Jagratha	Producer Mohan	
1989	Chakkikotha Chankaran	Wilson	
1990	Veena Meettiya Vilangukal		
2000	Vellimanithaalam		
2001	Chenchaayam		
2008	Twenty:20		
2009	Swami		
2013	Ms. Lekha Tharoor Kanunnathu		
2014	Hangover	Rakhavji/Rakhavan	
2014	Salalah Mobiles	Salauddeen	
2015	Kanal	Joseph	
2016	Pa Va	Jose Achayan	
2017	Oru Malayalam Colour Padam		
2021	Chaaya Pencil		
2023	Alone	Binoy	
2023	Poka	Khalid	

== Television ==
Year	Serial	Channel	Notes
2012–2013	Kadhayariyathe	Surya TV	television debut
2020	Aksharathettu	Mazhavil Manorama	
2020	Sooryakanthi	Mazhavil Manorama	
