= Makara Vilakku (film) =

- Directed by: P. K. Joseph
- Written by: S. L. Puram Sadanandan
- Screenplay by: S. L. Puram Sadanandan
- Starring: Jose; Sankaradi; Sumesh; Prathapachandran
- Music by: K. J. Joy
- Production company: Malithra Productions
- Distributed by: Anjo Movies
- Release date: 4 January 1980
- Country: India
- Language: Malayalam

Makara Vilakku is a 1980 Indian Malayalam film, directed by P. K. Joseph. The film stars Jose, Sankaradi, Sumesh and Prathapachandran in the lead roles. The film has musical score by K. J. Joy.

== Cast ==
- Jose
- Sankaradi
- Sumesh
- Prathapachandran
- Sathaar
- Aranmula Ponnamma
- Balan K. Nair
- Jayanthi
- Kanakadurga
- Vazhoor Rajan

== Soundtrack ==
The music was composed by K. J. Joy and the lyrics were written by Sreekumaran Thampi.

No.	Song	Singers	Length (m:ss)
1	"Makaravilakke Makaravilakke"	Srikanth	
2	"Vasanthathin Virimaaril"	Karthikeyan	
