= Chakraayudham =

1978 film

- Directed by: R. Reghuvaran Nair
- Written by: Sreemoolanagaram Vijayan
- Screenplay by: Sreemoolanagaram Vijayan
- Produced by: Areefa Hassan
- Starring: Sreemoolanagaram Vijayan; Sathar; Unnimary; Adoor Pankajam
- Edited by: K. Sankunni
- Music by: K. J. Joy
- Production company: Arifa Enterprises
- Distributed by: Arifa Enterprises
- Release date: 18 August 1978
- Country: India
- Language: Malayalam

Chakraayudham is a 1978 Indian Malayalam film, directed by R. Reghuvaran Nair and produced by Areefa Hassan. The film stars Sreemoolanagaram Vijayan, Sathar, Unnimary and Adoor Pankajam in the lead roles. The film has musical score by K. J. Joy.

== Cast ==
- Sreemoolanagaram Vijayan
- Sathaar
- Unnimary
- Adoor Pankajam
- Sathyapriya
- Ushakumari
- Vincent

== Soundtrack ==
The music was composed by K. J. Joy and the lyrics were written by Mankombu Gopalakrishnan and Yusufali Kechery.

No.	Song	Singers	Lyrics	Length (m:ss)
1	"Gamayeriyaal"	Vani Jairam	Mankombu Gopalakrishnan	
2	"Manmadharaanikale"	K. J. Yesudas	Yusufali Kechery	
3	"Nandyaarvattam Kudanivarthi"	P. Susheela	Yusufali Kechery	
4	"Thamburaane Thirumeni"	S. Janaki	Mankombu Gopalakrishnan	
