= Unni Mary =

Indian actress

- Born: Unni Mary; 12 March 1962 (age 64); Ernakulam, Kerala, India
- Other name: Deepa
- Occupation: Actress
- Years active: 1969–1992
- Spouse: Rejoy (m. 1982)
- Children: 1
- Parent(s): Augustine Fernandes; Victoria

Unni Mary is an Indian actress who works mainly in Malayalam films. She has also worked in Telugu, Tamil, Hindi and Kannada films, where she used the screen name Deepa.

== Personal life ==
Unnimary was born 12 March 1962 to Augustine Fernandes and Victoria. She had her primary education from St. Teresa's Convent School, Ernakulam. She has a brother, Joseph Martin. She started learning classical dance from the age of three. Her mother used to own a ballet troupe and she performed in many stages in India and abroad.

She married Rejoy, a professor at St. Albert's College, Ernakulam on 12 March 1982, and they have a son, Nirmal. Their son Nirmal is married to Ranjini and they have a son, Rihan.

== Filmography ==
=== Malayalam ===
Year	Film	Role	Notes
1971	Navavadhu		Child Artist
1971	Gangasangamam	Mary	Child Artist
1972	Sree Guruvayoorappan		
1974	Devi Kanyakumari		
1975	Picnic	Radha	
1975	Swami Ayappan		
1975	Thomasleeha		
1975	Ashtami Rohini		
1976	Chottanikkarayamma		
1976	Madhuram Thirumadhuram	Malini	
1976	Dheere Sameere Yamuna Theere	Roshini	
1976	Mallanum Mathenum		
1976	Manasaveena		
1976	Chennay Valarthiya Kutti		
1976	Amba Ambika Ambalika	Ambalika	
1977	Acharam Ammini Osharam Omana	Urmila	
1977	Kannapanunni	Thulasi	
1977	Poojakedukkatha Pookkal	Indira	
1977	Madura Swapnam		
1977	Pattalam Janaki		
1977	Dheerasameere Yamunaatheere		
1977	Aanandam Paramaanandam	Raji	
1977	Yatheem	Shakkeela	
1977	Minimol	Nirmala	
1977	Penpuli		
1978	Thacholi Ambu	Kanni	
1978	Mukkuvane Snehicha Bhootham	Ambili	
1978	Aval Vishosthyayirunnu	Seema	
1978	Pavadakkari		
1978	Soothrakkari		
1978	Shatrusamharam		
1978	Black Belt		
1978	Chakrayudham		
1978	Anakalari		
1978	Ashokavanam		
1978	Puthariyankam		
1978	Kudumbam Namukku Sreekovil	Geetha	
1978	Beena		
1978	Padmatheertham	Lathika	
1978	Nivedyam	Rajani	
1978	Kadathanattu Makkam		
1979	Jeevitham Oru Gaanam	Prameela	
1979	Ponnil Kulicha Rathri		
1979	Mochanam	Meera	
1979	Hridayathinte Nirangal		
1979	Valeduthavan Valal		
1980	Palattu Kunjikannan	Ponni	
1980	Pappu	Herself	
1981	Sanchari	Sumuki	
1982	Nagamadathu Thamburatti	Naga Queen	
1982	Sree Ayappanum Vavarum	Pandhalam Maharani	
1982	Bheeman		
1982	Jambulingam	Nun	
1982	Innalenkil Nale	Susheela	
1983	Belt Mathai	Rani	
1983	Ente Kadha	Aparna	
1983	Eenam		
1983	Oru Mukham Pala Mukham	Sarada	
1983	Mahabali	Nandini	
1983	Kattaruvi	Maala	
1983	Vaashi		
1983	Guru Dakshina		
1984	Unaroo	Sarah	
1984	Sandhya Mayangum Neram	Rohini	
1984	Oru Kochu Swapnam	Sofia	
1984	April-18	Rajamma	
1984	Thacholi Thankappan	Subaida	
1984	Kanamarayathu	Annie	
1984	Ente Upasana	Lekha	
1984	Thathamme Poocha Poocha	Shyama	
1984	Poomadathe Pennu	Nalini	
1984	Makale Mappu Tharu	Devaki	
1984	Jeevitham	Sudha	
1984	Koottinilam Kili	Nalini	
1984	Manithali	Sajna	
1984	Krishna Guruvayoorappa	Savithri	
1984	Aalkkoottathil Thaniye	Nalini	
1985	Pattham Udayam	Sarada	
1985	Thinkalazhcha Nalla Divasam	Bindu	
1985	Nerariyum Nerathu	Thankamani	
1985	Aa Neram Alpam Dooram	Rani	
1985	Katturani		
1985	Puli Varunne Puli	Suhasini	
1985	Manakkale Thatha	Jolly	
1985	Arodum Parayaruthu	Ambika	
1985	Shatru	Cicily	
1985	Oru Sandesham Koodi	Rajani	
1986	Arappatta Kettiya Gramathil	Devaki	
1986	Pappan Priyappetta Pappan	Devdas's Wife	
1986	Niramulla Raavukal	Call girl	
1986	Snehamulla Simham	Sudha	
1986	Kariyilakattu Pole	Bhaginisevamayi / Parvathi	
1986	Sakhavu		
1986	Onnu Randu Moonnu	Mini	
1986	Rareeram	Pathmavathi	
1987	Dheeran		
1987	Nombarathipoovu	Joycee	
1988	Chithram	Bhaskaran's sister	
1988	Ambalakara Panjayath		
1988	Oohakachavadam	Meera	
1989	Ammavanu Pattiya Amali	Bhargavi	
1989	Varum Varathikkilla		
1989	Kaliyuga Seetha		
1990	Shubhayathra		
1990	Ammayude Swantham Kunju Mary/Kunjikuruvi	Daisy	
1990	Arhatha	Ammini	
1990	Urvashi		
1991	Georgootty C/O Georgootty	Maria	
1991	Godfather	Omana	
1991	Keli	Mrs. Menon	
1991	Kizhakkunarum Pakshi	Girija	
1991	Kalari	Laila	
1991	Kadijool Kalyanam	Rajamma	
1991	Nagarathil Samsara Vishayam	Subhashini	
1991	Aakasha Kottayile Sultan	Pappy's sister	
1991	Kalamorukkam	Bird	
1992	Grihaprevesam	Padmavati	
1992	Aparatha	Nalini	
1992	Ulsavamelam	Sreedevi	
1992	Ennodishtam Koodamo	Arathi's aunt	

=== Tamil ===
Year	Film	Role	Notes
1975	Andharangam	Deepa	
1975	Swami Ayyappan		
1978	Mudi Sooda Mannan		
1979	Neeya?	Deepa	
1979	Rosaappo Ravikkai Kaari	Nandini	
1979	Nallathoru Kudumbam		
1979	Manthoppu Kiliye	Sarada	
1980	Ullasa Paravaigal		
1980	Johnny	Bhama	
1980	Vedanai Thediya Maan		
1980	Theru Vilakku		
1980	Valli Mayil		
1980	Veli Thandiya Velladu		
1980	Ilayarajavin Rasikai	Kavitha	
1981	Meendum Kokila	Kamini	
1981	Kannadi		
1981	Vaa Intha Pakkam		
1981	Kadhal Kadhal Kadhal	Vaani	
1983	Mundhanai Mudichu	Pattu Teacher	
1984	Anni		
1984	Kuzhandhai Yesu		
1984	Neram Nalla Neram		
1984	Vazhkai	Sumathi	
1985	Marma Manithan		
1985	Raja Yuvaraja	Anitha	
1985	Santhosha Kanavukal	Gowri	
1986	Sippikkul Muthu	Subbu	
1986	Murattu Karangal		
1986	Naanum Oru Thozhilali		
1987	Neram Nalla Irikku		
1987	Vaazhga Valarga	Nandini	
1987	Koottu Puzhukkal		
1988	Kalyana Paravaigal		
1990	Amman Kovil Thiruvizha		
1992	Pattathu Raani		

=== Telugu ===
Year	Film	Role	Notes
1976	America Ammayi		
1977	Prema Lekhalu		
1977	Andame Anandam		
1977	Khaidi Kalidasu	Sujatha	
1977	Dana Veera Soora Karna	Uttara	
1977	Panthulamma		
1978	Chal Mohana Ranga		
1978	Dudu Basavanna	Malli	
1978	Nindu Manishi	Sanja	
1979	Akbar Saleem Anarkali	Anarkali	
1979	Rangoon Rowdy	Deepa	
1979	Dasa Thirigindi		
1979	Andame Anandam		
1980	Sri Vinayaka Vijayam		
1980	Nagamalli		
1980	Podarillu		
1980	O Inti Bhagotham		
1980	Thathayya Premaleelalu	Savitha	
1980	Triloka Sundari		
1980	Kaliyuga Ravanasurudu		
1980	O Inti Bhagotham		
1980	Pilla Zamindar		
1981	Deepaaradhana		
1982	Kothaneeru		
1982	Ramayanamlo Pidakala Veta		
1983	Raju Rani Jackie	Geetha	
1984	Kutumba Gauravam		
1985	Aatmabalam	Pankajavalli / Pinky	
1985	Ladies Tailor	Nurse Daya	
1985	Kongumudi	Geetha	
1985	Darja Donga		
1985	Surya Chandra		
1986	Swathi Muthyam	Subbulu	
1986	Gharana Rowdy		
1986	Aakrandana	Devudamma	
1987	Dabbevariki Chedu		
1987	Thandri Kodukula Challenge		
1987	Andarikante Ghanudu		
1987	Ramu	Girja	
1987	Chaitanyam		
1990	Kaliyuga Viswamithra		

=== Kannada ===
Year	Film	Role	Notes
1979	Vijay Vikram	Lata	
1979	Naniruvude Ninagagi	Shobha	
1983	Ibbani Karagithu	Swetha	
1985	Kadina raaja	Usha	
1985	Dhruva Thare	Sarala	
1985	Thaayi kanasu		
1985	Sathi Sakkubai		
1985	Guru Jagatguru	Hema	

=== Hindi ===
Year	Film	Role	Notes
1979	Amar Deep	Lata	
1984	Zindagi Jeene Ke Liye		
