= Theerangal =

- Directed by: Rajeevnath
- Written by: C. N. Sreekandan Nair
- Screenplay by: Rajeevnath; C. N. Sreekandan Nair
- Starring: Jayabharathi; KPAC Lalitha; M. G. Soman; Nellikode Bhaskaran
- Cinematography: Hemachandran
- Edited by: Ravi
- Music by: P. K. Sivadas; V. K. Sasidharan
- Production company: Sithara Films
- Distributed by: Sithara Films
- Release date: 6 January 1978
- Country: India
- Language: Malayalam

Theerangal is a 1978 Indian Malayalam film, directed by Rajeevnath. The film stars Jayabharathi, KPAC Lalitha, M. G. Soman and Nellikode Bhaskaran in the lead roles. The film has musical score by P. K. Sivadas and V. K. Sasidharan.

== Cast ==
- Jayabharathi
- KPAC Lalitha
- M. G. Soman
- Nellikode Bhaskaran
- Vincent

== Soundtrack ==
The music was composed by P. K. Sivadas and V. K. Sasidharan and the lyrics were written by Ettumanoor Somadasan.

No.	Song	Singers	Lyrics	Length (m:ss)
1	"Jeevanil Jeevante" (From The film Kamuki)	K. J. Yesudas	Ettumanoor Somadasan	
2	"Vaadikkozhinju" (From The film Kamuki)	K. J. Yesudas	Ettumanoor Somadasan	
