= Seemanthini (1978 film) =

- Directed by: P. G. Vishwambharan
- Written by: A. R. Mukesh
- Screenplay by: A. R. Mukesh
- Produced by: N. Sarathkumar
- Starring: Madhu; Jayabharathi; Kaviyoor Ponnamma; Jose
- Cinematography: Anandakuttan
- Edited by: V. P. Krishnan
- Music by: Jaya Vijaya
- Production company: Sarathi Productions
- Distributed by: Sarathi Productions
- Release date: 23 June 1978
- Country: India
- Language: Malayalam

Seemanthini is a 1978 Indian Malayalam film, directed by P. G. Vishwambharan and produced by N. Sarathkumar. The film stars Madhu, Jayabharathi, Kaviyoor Ponnamma and Jose in the lead roles. The film has musical score by Jaya Vijaya.

== Cast ==
- Madhu
- Jayabharathi
- Sudheer
- Jose
- Sathaar
- Seema
- Kaviyoor Ponnamma

== Soundtrack ==
The music was composed by Jaya Vijaya and the lyrics were written by Biju Ponneth.

No.	Song	Singers	Lyrics	Length (m:ss)
1	"Ambalanadayil"	K. J. Yesudas	Biju Ponneth	
2	"Kulir Pichippoo"	K. J. Yesudas	Biju Ponneth	
3	"Nalina Vanathil"	K. J. Yesudas, S. Janaki	Biju Ponneth	
4	"Sundara Surabhila"	Vani Jairam, Chorus, Jolly Abraham	Biju Ponneth	
