= Rajaneegandhi =

- Directed by: M. Krishnan Nair
- Written by: Manih Muhammed (dialogues)
- Screenplay by: Manih Muhammed
- Produced by: N. G. John
- Starring: Madhu; Lakshmi; Adoor Bhasi; Jose
- Cinematography: C. E. Babu; Chandramohan
- Edited by: V. P. Krishnan
- Music by: G. Devarajan
- Production company: Geo Movies
- Distributed by: Geo Movies
- Release date: 11 July 1980
- Country: India
- Language: Malayalam

Rajaneegandhi is a 1980 Indian Malayalam film, directed by M. Krishnan Nair and produced by N. G. John. The film stars Madhu, Lakshmi, Adoor Bhasi and Jose in the lead roles. The film has musical score by G. Devarajan.

== Cast ==
- Madhu as Dr. Gopinath
- Lakshmi as Sumathy
- Adoor Bhasi as Krishna Menon
- Jose as Murali
- Manavalan Joseph as Nanu Pillai
- Sreelatha Namboothiri as Bharathi
- Prathapachandran as Vasu Menon
- Kundara Johny
- Kuthiravattam Pappu as Bharathi's husband d'Costa
- P. R. Menon
- Paravoor Bharathan as Shivaraman Nair
- Ravikumar as Krishnakumar
- Sharmila as Mallika
- Shobhana (Roja Ramani) as Usha
- Silk Smitha as Sheela

== Soundtrack ==
The music was composed by G. Devarajan and the lyrics were written by Yusufali Kechery.

No.	Song	Singers	Lyrics	Length (m:ss)
1	"Hello This is Johnny"	P. Jayachandran, Chorus, Latha Raju	Yusufali Kechery	
2	"Ithaanu Jeevitha Vidyaalayam"	K. J. Yesudas	Yusufali Kechery	
3	"Maadakathidambe"	K. J. Yesudas, Latha Raju	Yusufali Kechery	
4	"Snehathin Sandeshageethamaay"	P. Jayachandran, P. Madhuri	Yusufali Kechery	
