= Hridhayam Paadunnu =

- Directed by: G.Prem Kumar
- Written by: T. V. Gopalakrishnan (dialogues)
- Screenplay by: Gulab Prem Kumar
- Produced by: Lankal Murugesu
- Starring: Sukumari; Jagathy Sreekumar; Jose; Jalaja
- Cinematography: Suresh
- Edited by: Kanthaswamy
- Music by: K. J. Joy
- Production company: Lankal Films
- Distributed by: Lankal Films
- Release date: 19 September 1980
- Country: India
- Languages: Malayalam; Tamil

Hridhayam Paadunnu (Malayalam)/Antharangam Oomaiyanathu (Tamil) is a 1980 Indian Malayalam-Tamil bilingual film, directed by Gulab Prem Kumar. The film stars Sukumari, Jagathy Sreekumar, Jose and Jalaja in the lead roles. The film has musical score by K. J. Joy.

== Cast ==
- Sukumari
- Jagathy Sreekumar (Malayalam)/Suruli Rajan (Tamil)
- Jose
- Jalaja
- Jayamalini
- M. G. Soman
- Rajani Sharma
- Ravikumar
- Roopa

== Soundtrack ==
The music was composed by K. J. Joy and the lyrics were written by Yusufali Kechery.

No.	Song	Singers	Lyrics	Length (m:ss)
1	"Hridayam Paadunnu"	K. J. Yesudas	Yusufali Kechery	
2	"Pranayam Viriyum Raagam"	K. J. Yesudas	Yusufali Kechery	
3	"Sindoorappoomchundinayil"	K. J. Yesudas, P. Madhuri	Yusufali Kechery	
4	"Thechippoove Mizhithurakku"	K. J. Yesudas, S. Janaki	Yusufali Kechery	
