= Iniyum Puzhayozhukum =

1978 film by I. V. Sasi

- Directed by: I. V. Sasi
- Written by: Rose; A. Sheriff (dialogues)
- Screenplay by: A. Sheriff
- Produced by: N. G. John
- Starring: Lakshmi; M. G. Soman; Vidhubala; Jayan
- Cinematography: Vipin Das
- Edited by: K. Narayanan
- Music by: G. Devarajan
- Production company: Geo Movies
- Distributed by: Geo Movies
- Release date: 23 December 1978
- Country: India
- Language: Malayalam

Iniyum Puzhayozhukum is a 1978 Indian Malayalam film, directed by I. V. Sasi and produced by N. G. John. The film stars Lakshmi, M. G. Soman, Vidhubala and Jayan in the lead roles. G. Devarajan composed the musical score.

== Cast ==
- Lakshmi as Celin Thomas
- M. G. Soman as Prabhakaran
- Vidhubala as Radha
- Jayan as Mr. Nambiar
- Sathar as Salim
- Adoor Bhavani as Celin Thomas' Servant
- Alummoodan as Shekhar
- Bahadoor as Prabhakaran's Father
- Janardanan as Sukumaran
- Jose as Alex
- Sankaradi as Mr. Kurup
- Sreelatha Namboothiri
- Muralimohan as Mr. Thomas
- T. P. Madhavan as Doctor

== Soundtrack ==
The music was composed by G. Devarajan with lyrics written by Yusufali Kechery.

No.	Song	Singers	Lyrics	Length (m:ss)
1	"Gangaa Yamunakale"	K. J. Yesudas	Yusufali Kechery	
2	"Kanakaangi"	K. J. Yesudas	Yusufali Kechery	
3	"Odum Kuthira"	P. Jayachandran, P. Madhuri	Yusufali Kechery	

== view the film ==
- iniyum puzha ozhukum on YouTube
