= Kudumbam Namukku Sreekovil =

- Directed by: Hariharan
- Written by: S. L. Puram Sadanandan
- Produced by: T. E. Vasudevan
- Starring: Prem Nazir; Adoor Bhasi; Jose Prakash; Sankaradi
- Cinematography: Vipin Das, Krishnankutty
- Edited by: MN Appu
- Music by: V. Dakshinamoorthy
- Production company: Jaya Maruthi
- Distributed by: Jaya Maruthi
- Release date: 14 January 1978
- Country: India
- Language: Malayalam

Kudumbam Namukku Sreekovil is a 1978 Indian Malayalam film, directed by Hariharan and produced by T. E. Vasudevan. The film stars Prem Nazir, Adoor Bhasi, Jose Prakash and Sankaradi in the lead roles. The film has musical score by V. Dakshinamoorthy.

== Cast ==
- Prem Nazir
- Adoor Bhasi
- Jose Prakash
- Kaviyoor Ponnamma
- Sankaradi
- Sukumaran
- Mallika Sukumaran
- Unnimary
- Janardanan
- K. R. Vijaya
- Meena
- Master Raghu as Raghu

== Soundtrack ==
The music was composed by V. Dakshinamoorthy.

No.	Song	Singers	Lyrics	Length (m:ss)
1	"Daivam Bhoomiyil"	K. J. Yesudas, P. Jayachandran	Mankombu Gopalakrishnan	
2	"Ettumaanoorambalathin"	P. Jayachandran, Ambili	Mankombu Gopalakrishnan	
3	"Innolam Kaanatha"	K. J. Yesudas, Kalyani Menon	Mankombu Gopalakrishnan	
4	"Omkaarapporulil"	K. J. Yesudas	Mankombu Gopalakrishnan	
