= Sathaar =

Indian actor (1952–2019)

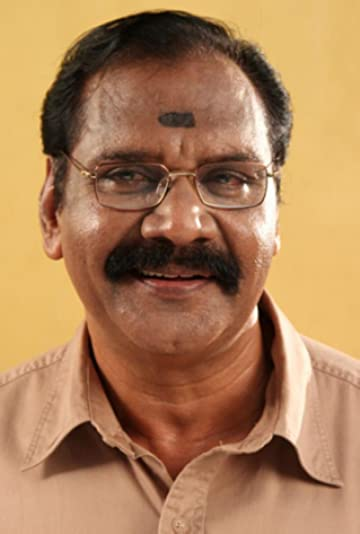
- Born: 25 May 1952; Kadungalloor, Aluva, Kingdom of Cochin, Dominion of India (present day Ernakulam, Kerala, India)
- Died: 17 September 2019 (aged 67); Aluva, Ernakulam, Kerala, India
- Education: Union Christian College, Aluva
- Occupation: Actor
- Years active: 1975–2019
- Spouse: Jayabharathi (m. 1979–2019)
- Children: Krish J. Sathaar
- Parents: Khadar Pillai; Fathima

Sathaar (25 May 1952 – 17 September 2019) was an Indian actor who primarily worked in Malayalam films. He made his acting debut with M. Krishnan Nair's Bharyaye Avashyamundu (1975). He became a hero in 1976, with Anaavaranam, directed by A. Vincent. Even though he started as a leading man, later he became a successful villain as well as a character actor. He also had important roles in the early 80's Tamil films Mayil and Soundaryame Varuga Varuga. He acted in almost 300 movies including Tamil and Telugu.

He was in the industry for more than 45 years and made a comeback after a brief hiatus with 22 Female Kottayam.

He died on 17 September 2019 at Aluva.

== Family ==
He was the ninth child among ten children born to Khadar Pillai and Fathima at Kadungalloor, Aluva. His father was a Muslim landlord and his mother was a housewife. He had seven brothers, Abdu Kunjhu, Abdhulla, Kunju Mohammad, Kochumakkar, Veeravunny, V. K. Karim, Abdul Jaleel and two sisters, Khadeeja and Jameela. He had his primary education from Government High School West Kadungalloor Aluva and went on to pursue an M.A. in History from Union Christian College, Aluva.

During the filming of K. Narayanan's film Beena, the love affair of Sathaar and Jayabharathi began and they got married in 1979. The couple parted ways in 1987. However, they continued to maintain a cordial relationship until Sathaar's death. Jayabharathi and his family has nursed him during his last days. The couple's only son Krish J. Sathaar made his debut as an actor in acclaimed director Siddique' s Mohanlal-starrer Ladies and Gentleman. Even though Jayabharathi was away for years, he never married again. In many reports, Sathaar and Jayabharathi were divorced, but they were not divorced.

== Death ==
Sathar died at 4:30 AM on 17 September 2019 at C. A. Hospital, Aluva. He had been undergoing treatment for a liver problem for three months at a private hospital in Aluva. He was 67. The funeral was held at West Kadungalloor Juma Masjid.

== Filmography ==
Year	Title	Role	Notes
1975	Bhaaryaye Aavashyamundu		
1976	Anaavaranam	Debut as lead	
1977	Yatheem	Azees	
1978	Iniyum Puzhayozhukum	Saleem	
1978	Yagaswam		
1978	Avalude Ravukal	Police Inspector	
1978	Padmatheertham	Muralidharan	
1978	Sundarimaarude Swapnangal		
1978	Avar Jeevikkunnu		
1978	Adimakachavadam		
1978	Beena	Sarathchandran	
1978	Chakrayudham		
1978	Seemanthini		
1979	Ee Manoharatheeram		
1979	Thiranottam		
1979	Anarkali		
1979	Thenthulli		
1979	Agni Parvatham		
1979	Sarapancharam	Prabhakaran	
1979	Neelathamara	Appukuttan	
1979	Ajnaatha Theerangal		
1979	Avalude Prathikaram		
1979	Indradhanussu	Inspector Nair	
1979	Aval Niraparadhi		
1979	Sugathinu Pinnale	Soman, Ramesh	
1979	Manavadharmam		
1979	Ivide Kattinu Sugandam	Ravi	
1979	Iniyethra Sandhyakal		
1979	Jimmy	Johny	
1979	Ishtapraaneshwari		
1980	Soundaryame Varuga Varuga		Tamil film
1980	Benz Vasu	Madhu	
1980	Chandra Bimbam		
1980	Adhikaram	Gopan	
1980	Ammayum Makalum		
1980	Deepam	Prathap	
1980	Prakadanam	Gopalan	
1980	Muthuchippikal	Gopi	
1980	Sathyam	Raghavan	
1980	Makara Vilakku		
1980	Sakthi		
1980	Moorkhan	Rajan	
1980	Lava	Gopi	
1981	Kaahalam	Doctor	
1981	Avatharam	Ravi	
1981	Choothattam		
1981	Ira Thedunna Manushyar		
1981	Kodumudikal		
1981	Arayannam	Raghu	
1981	Aakkramanam		
1981	Pathirasooryan	Basheer	
1981	Ahimsa	Bichu	
1982	Vidhichathum Kothichathum	Sasi	
1982	Paanjajanyam	Soman	
1982	Jambulingam	Moosakutty	
1982	Bheeman		
1982	Thuranna Jail	James	
1982	Ee Nadu	Rajagopala Varma	
1982	Sharam		
1982	Keni	Chandran	
1982	Mazhu		
1982	Padayottam		
1982	Kurukkante Kalyanam	Gopi	
1983	Kadamba		
1983	Visa		
1983	Mandanmar Londonil	Johny	
1983	Belt Mathai	Roy	
1984	Manasariyathe	Mohan	
1984	Pavam Krooran	Shaji	
1984	Idavelakku Sesham		
1984	Rakshassu	Ravi	
1984	Mainakam		
1984	Adiyozhukkukal	Narayanan	
1984	Thacholi Thankappan		
1985	Vellam	Thampi	
1985	Revenge	William	
1985	Ottayan	Jambu	
1985	Kannaaram Pothippothi	Chandran	
1985	Shathru	Ramakrishnan	
1985	Nayakan	Ali Abdulla	
1985	Janakeeya Kodathi		
1985	Chorakku Chora	Markose	
1985	Black Mail	Suresh	
1986	Cabaret Dancer		
1986	Shobhraj		
1986	Niramulla Ravulkal	Balan Pilla	
1986	Aalorungi Arangorungi		
1986	Urukku Manushyan		
1987	Avalude Katha		
1987	Kaala Rathri		
1987	Manja Manthrangal	Thomas	
1987	Ithrayum Kaalam	Krishnankutty	
1988	Agnichirakulla Thumbi		
1988	Janmashathru	Johny	
1989	Ayiram Chirakulla Moham	Karuppayan	
1989	Puthiya Karukkal	Jagadeesh	
1989	Kalpana House	David	
1989	Aval Oru Sindhu		
1990	Lal Americayil		
1990	Kelikottu		
1990	Indhanam		
1990	Indrajaalam	Chandrakumar	
1990	Thaalam		
1990	Samrajyam	Mathews	
1990	Parampara		
1992	Avalariyathee	David D'cruz	
1992	Kasarkode Khaderbai		
1992	Ennodu Ishtam Koodamo		
1992	Nadodi		
1993	Yaadhavam	Chekkutty	
1993	Mafia	Krishnan	
1993	Sowbhagyam		
1993	Devaasuram	Vasu	
1993	Injakkadan Mathai & Sons		
1994	Kambolam		
1994	Commissioner	SP Bobby I.P.S	
1994	Chief Minister K. R. Gowthami		
1995	Karma		
1995	Chantha	Commissioner Ravishanker	
1995	Boxer	Home Minister	
1995	Aadyathe Kanmani	Nambyathiri	
1996	Mookkilla Rajyathu Murimookkan Rajavu		
1996	Dominic Presentation	Satheesh Chandran	
1996	Hitlist	Markose	
1996	Kadhanayika	Thomasooty	
1996	Swarna Kireedom	Inspector	
1997	Vamsam		
1997	Masmaram	Mahadevan	
1997	Lelam	Kunnel Outhakutty	
1997	Kalyana Unnikal		
1998	Kalapam	Pallippadan	
1999	The Godman	A.Khader Sahib	
1999	Sparsham	Rajashekharan	
1999	Thachiledathu Chundan	Geevarghese	
2000	Arayannangalude Veedu	Sudhakaran	
2000	Rapid Action Force	SP John Varghese	
2001	Ee Raavil		
2001	Pranayakalathu		
2002	Kanalkireedam		
2002	Anuragam		
2002	Mohaswapnam		
2003	The Fire		
2005	Vajram	Mandari Mathan	
2006	Pakal	K.M.P. Nambiar	
2006	Mantra Shakti		TV movie
2008	Roudram		
2012	Banking Hours 10 to 4	Vasudevan Pillai	
2012	22 Female Kottayam	DK	
2012	No. 66 Madhura Bus	Jailer Koshy	
2012	Kalikaalam		
2013	Kaanchi	Krishna Pilla	
2013	For Sale	Warrier	
2013	On the Way		
2013	Natholi Oru Cheriya Meenalla	Capt. Geethakrishnan	
2014	Mr. Fraud		
2014	Parayan Baaki Vechathu		
2014	Manglish	Paulose Punnookaaran	
2014	Avatharam	Commissioner	
2015	Onnum Onnum Moonnu		

== Television ==
- Valayalam (DD Malayalam)
- Crime And Punishment (Asianet)
- Swantham Malootty (Asianet)
- Lipstick (Asianet)

== Produced films ==
- Black Mail (1985)
- Revenge (1985)
- Kambolam(1994)
