= Kuthiravattam Pappu =

Indian film actor

- Born: Padmadalakshan; 24 December 1936; Feroke, Madras Presidency, British India
- Died: 25 February 2000 (aged 63); Kozhikode, Kerala, India
- Other name: Pappu
- Years active: 1963–2000
- Spouse: Padmini
- Children: Bindu Pappu, Biju Pappu, Binu Pappu
- Parent(s): Panangat Raman; Devi

Panangat Padmadalakshan, better known by his stage name Kuthiravattam Pappu (24 December 1936 – 25 February 2000), was a popular Indian stage and film actor. His repertoire of acting was based on his unique style and use of the Kozhikodan dialect, impeccable timing and the capability to grasp the subtle nuances of any character and mould it into his signature "Pappu style". He acted in over 1,000 Malayalam films. He made his debut in a small comic role in Bhargavi Nilayam. His character was named Kuthiravattom, a name that stuck for the rest of his career.

== Early life ==
Pappu was born as Padmadalakshan in Feroke, near Kozhikode, Kerala, to Panaghat Raman and Devi. The family moved to the village of Kuthiravattam (half a kilometre from Govindapuram, Kozhikode when Pappu was still a child. He was keen in acting from childhood and performed his first major stage performance when he was 17. At the time, he was studying in St. Antony's School, Calicut.

== Family ==
He was married to Padmini. The couple have three children, Bindu, Biju and Binu. Binu Pappu is an actor in Malayalam movies.

== Career ==
Pappu started his career as a drama artist. He acted in about 1,000 instant plays and two professional dramas, Samasya and Manasu. His role in the drama Samasya fetched him the Best Comedian Award.

Pappu had worked with Kunjandi, Nellikode Bhaskaran, Thikkodiyan and K. T. Muhammed. Film personalities Ramu Karyat and A. Vincent were impressed by his performance in Mudiyanaya Puthran and gave him a chance to act in the film Moodupadam. His first noted role was in Bhargavi Nilayam, written by Vaikom Muhammad Basheer and directed by A. Vincent. The name of his character in the film given by Vaikom Muhammad Basheer, "Kuthiravattam Pappu" stayed with him for the rest of his life.

His performance in Angadi, Ahimsa, Karimbana, Ee nadu, Moorkhan, Aalkkoottathil Thaniye, Itha Oru Theeram, Kanakkinavu was remarkable. His roles in Chembarathi, Avalude Ravukal, Angaadi became the turning point of his career. Even his brief roles like those in Manichitrathazhu and The King are well remembered till this day. His one-liners like "Taski Viliyeda" in Thenmavin Kombath and "Ippo Sariyakkitharam" and "'Thamaraseri Churam'" in Vellanakalude Nadu earned their position in the list of Malayalam idioms. His first reference about Thamarassery churam was in the movie T P Balagopalan M A.

Pappu became one of the best comedians Malayalam cinema has ever seen. He used Kozhikode slang in his acting which was well liked and appreciated. Due to his affection toward plays, with the help of his old friends in the field of theatre, he founded Akshara Theatres a few weeks before his death. He died in a private hospital in Calicut following a cardiac arrest on 25 February 2000.

== Partial filmography ==
=== Malayalam ===
- Ammaye Kaanaan (1963) as Pamman
- Aadyakiranangal (1964)
- Thacholi Othenan (1964) as Ramar
- Bhargavi Nilayam (1964) as Kuthiravattam Pappu
- Kuttyedathi (1971) as Kuttishankaran
- Chembarathi (1972) as Kuttan
- Panimudakku (1972) as Yashodharan
- Nirmalyam (1973)
- Kaapalika (1973) as Ithakku
- Mazhakkaru (1973) as Maniyan
- Criminals (Kayangal) (1975)
- Cheenavala (1975) as Fernandez
- Penpada (1975) as Janaki(Transvestite)
- Sathyathinte Nizhalil (1975)
- Chattambikkalyaani (1975) as Kochappan
- Ulsavam(1975) as Paramu
- Hridhayam Oru Kshethram (1976) as Nanu
- Madhuram Thirumaduram (1976)
- Thulavarsham (1976) as Chenkeeri
- Kamadhenu (1976) as Kunjiraman
- Aalinganam (1976) as Peethambharan
- Guruvayoor Kesavan (1977)
- Vidarunna Mottukal (1977) as Madhupan
- Shankupushppam (1977) as Rajesh
- Angeekaram (1977) as Neelambharan
- Oonjal (1977) as Sankaran
- Avalude Ravukal (1978)
- Eeta (1978) as Paramu
- Lisa (1978) as Gopalan
- Arum Anyaralla (1978) as Bhargavan
- Itha Oru Manushyan (1978) as Bharathan
- Ee Manohara Theeram (1978) as Appukuttan
- Kaathirunna Nimisham (1978) as Harischandran Nair
- Angakkuri (1979)
- Kayalum Kayarum (1979)
- Maamaankam (1979)
- Neelathamara (1979) as Kuttishankara Menon
- Jeevitham Oru Gaanam (1979) as Zachariah/Rappel (double role)
- Itha Oru Theeram (1979) as Chellappan
- Agnivyuham (1979) as Appu
- Sugathinu Pinnale (1979) as Kunjuvareed
- Anupallavi (1979) as Sundaran
- Ivide Kattinu Sugandam (1979) as Pushkaran
- Ambalavilakku (1979) as Lonachan
- Manasa Vacha Karmana (1979)
- Moorkhan (1980) as Kuttappan
- Swantham Enna Padam (1980) as Manmadan
- Karimpana (1980) as Palayyan
- Chaakara (1980) as Kuttan Pillai
- Sathyam (1980) as Sankaran
- Angaadi (1980) as Abu
- Benz Vasu (1980) as Pappu
- Theekkadal (1980) as Pappan
- Aswaratham (1980) as Velayyan
- Meen (1980) as Pappy
- Prakadanam (1980) as Kamalahasanan
- Rajaneegandhi (1980) as
- Raagam Thaanam Pallavi (1980) as Gopalankutty
- Mr Michael (1980) as Pappu
- Kaavalmaadam (1980) as Kunjali
- Arikkari Ammu (1981)
- Attimari (1981) as Salim, Hameed
- Sphodanam (1981) as Narayana Pilla
- Ahimsa as Muthu (1981)
- Garjanam (1981)
- Dwanthayudham (1981)
- Vayal (1981) as Sankunni
- Kaahalam (1981)
- Greeshmajwaala (1981) as Chothi
- Kodumudikal (1981) as Nanappan
- Asthamikkatha Pakalukal (1981) as Gopalan
- Poochasanyasi (1981)
- Ee Nadu (1982) as Khader
- Mattuvin Chattangale (1982)
- Thadakam (1982)
- Postmortem (1982)
- Veedu (1982) as Prabhakaran
- Sindoora Sandhyakku Mounam (1982) as Chandran
- Pooviriyum Pulari (1982) as Nanu
- John Jaffer Janardhanan (1982) as Charlie
- Innalenkil Nale (1982)
- Anuraagakkodathi(1982) as Gopi
- Varanmare Avashyamundu(1982)
- Hello Madras Girl (1983)
- Gurudakshina (1983) as Pappu
- Eettappuli (1983) as Pappan
- Mortuary (1983) as Gopalan
- Thavalam (1983) as Thommi
- Thimingalam (1983)
- Aadhipathyam (1983) as Kunjiraman
- Enne Njan Thedunnu (1983) as Unni
- Belt Mathai (1983) as Pachu Pillai
- Thathamme Poocha Poocha (1984) as Ananthan
- Poochakkoru Mookkuthi (1984) as Kuttan
- Mainakam (1984) as Vasu
- Shabadham (1984) as Kunjan Nair
- Aalkoottathil Thaniye (1984) as Kuttikrishnan
- Onnum Mindatha Bharya (1984) as Bapputti
- Appunni (1984) as Karunakaran
- Adiyozhukkukal (1984) as Sivan Kutti
- Rakshassu (1984) as Mammad
- Theere Pratheekshikkathe(1984) as Achu
- Kodathi (1984) as Antonym
- Odaruthammava Aalariyam (1984) as Pachu Pillai
- Parayanumvayya Parayathirikkanumvayya (1985) as Raman
- Mutharamkunnu P.O. (1985) as K. P. K. Thankappan
- Kaiyum Thalayum Purathidaruthu (1985) as Appu
- Jeevante Jeevan (1985) as Peter
- Angadikkappurathu (1985) as Pappu
- Ottayan (1985) as Korappan
- Shathru (1985) as Kurup
- Idanilangal (1985) as Swami Pilla
- Pachavelicham (1985)
- Chorakku Chora (1985) as Velu
- Mukhyamanthri (1985) as Kuttappan
- Principal Olivil (1985)
- Vartha (1986)
- Vivahithare Ithile (1986)
- T. P. Balagopalan M.A. (1986) as Chandrankutty
- Ayalvasi Oru Daridravasi (1986) as Velu
- Mazha Peyyunnu Maddalam Kottunnu (1986) as Koma Kurup
- Annoru Ravil (1986) as Antony Nair
- Nandi Veendum Varika (1986) as Mukundan
- Karinagam (1986)
- Nakhakshathangal (1986)
- Ithramathram (1986) as Pappan
- Naradhan Keralathil (1987) as Police Constable
- Ithrayum Kalam (1987) as Sankunni Nair
- Janangalude Sradhakku (1987) as Balan
- Amrutham Gamaya (1987) as Kumaran
- Vellanakalude Nadu (1988) as Sulaiman
- Anuragi (1988) as Kunjappan
- Aryan (1988)
- Kanakambarangal (1988) as Nanappan
- Oru Muthassi Katha (1988) as Koyammedkka
- Mukunthetta Sumitra Vilikkunnu (1988) as Aussapachen
- Loose Loose Arappiri Loose (1988) as Pappu
- Janmandharam (1988) as Kuruppilli Kuriakose
- Abkari (1988) as Kumaran
- 1921 (1988)
- Annakutty Kodambakkam Vilikkunnu (1989) as Mathai
- Ulsavapittennu (1989) as Pushpangadan
- Peruvannapurathe Visheshangal (1989) as Pushpangadan
- Naduvazhikal (1989) as K. C.
- Mahayanam (1989) as Kunjappan
- Vandhanam (1989)
- V.I.P. (1989) as Khaderkutty
- Aazhikkoru Muthu (1989) as Kuttan Pilla
- Pradeshika Varthakal (1989) as Velichappadu
- Saandhram (1990) as Caesar
- Nagarangalil Chennu Raparkam (1990)
- Dr. Pasupathy (1990) as Uthpalakshan
- Aye Auto (1990) as Moidu
- Nammude Nadu (1990) as Musthafa
- Midhya (1990) as Ezhuthachan
- Oliyampukal (1990) as Thankan
- Anaswaram (1991) as Tool/Ambady Ramakrishnan
- Amina Tailors (1991) as Kunjalavi
- Pookkalam Varavayi (1991) as Mariyappan
- Parallel College (1991) as Sanathan Pillai
- Kadinjool Kalyanam (1991) as Mathai
- Georgekutty C/O Georgekutty (1991) as Paulose
- Advaitham (1991) as Kaiyathan
- Amaram (1991) as Raman Kutty
- Eagle (1991) as Azeez
- Mookkillarajyathu (1991) as Vasu/Sundaran Pillai
- Neelagiri (1991) as Arumukhan
- Utsava Melam (1992)
- Radhachakram (1992) as Ponnan
- Kizhakkan Pathrose (1992) as Devassia/Marangodan (nickname)
- Naadody (1992) as Kutty
- Johnnie Walker (1992)
- Vietnam Colony (1993) as Erumeli
- Midhunam (1993) as Palisha Peethambaran
- Manichithrathazhu (1993) as Kattuparamban
- Ekalavyan (1993) as Govindan Kutty
- Customs Diary (1993) as Vishwanathan
- Akashadoothu (1993) as Chandy
- Arthana (1993)
- Aayirappara (1993)
- Pingami (1994) as Achuthan
- Thenmavin Kombathu (1994) as Ammavan
- Chakoram (1994) as Ammama
- Chukkan (1994) as Beeranikka
- Gamanam (1994) as Kunjiraman
- Minnaram (1994) as Tutor Cleetus
- Nirnayam (1995) as Servant
- Kakkakum Poochakkum Kalyanam (1995)
- Vrudhanmare Sookshikkuka (1995) as Sundaresan Nair
- Tom & Jerry (1995) as Kesava Kaimal
- Thovalapookkal (1995)
- Kokkarakko (1995)
- Thirumanassu(1995) as Raman
- Highway (1995) as Rajappan
- Alancherry Thambrakkal (1995) as Kariyathen
- Indian Military Intelligence (1995) as Aroodam Anandan
- Kidilol Kidilam (1995) as Hassan
- Kaattile Thadi Thevarude Ana (1995) as Veerappan
- The King (1995) as Krishnan
- Thooval Kottaram (1996) as Kunjuraman Menon
- Aayiram Naavulla Ananthan (1996) as Koyakka
- Mr. Clean (1996) as Bhargavan Pillai
- Madamma (1996) as Politician
- Hitlist (1996) as Sankar Das
- Sugavaasam (1996) as Venkidi
- Kudamattom (1997) as Nanu
- Irattakuttikalude Achan (1997) as Sub Inspector C.T.R Kurup
- Kalyana Unnikal (1997) as Kuttappi
- Kalyanappittannu (1997)
- Mayaponman (1997) as Motor Doctor Mathai
- Hitler Brothers (1997) as Nanappan
- Ekkareyanente Manasam (1997) as Sumathi's Uncle
- Chandralekha (1997) as Accountant
- Aaraam Thampuran (1997) as Mangalam
- Magician Mahendralal from Delhi (1998) as Sivan Pillai
- Pranayavarnangal (1998)
- Sundarakilladi (1998)
- Oro Viliyum Kathorthu (1998) as Achuthan
- Mayajalam (1998) as Paramanandan Nair
- Summer in Bethleham (1998) Replaced Kalabhavan Mani
- Gloria Fernades From USA (1998)
- Thirakkalkkapuram (1998) as Kittunni
- Charlie Chaplin (1999)
- Garshom (1999) as Damodaran
- Pallavur Devanarayanan (1999) as Kunjuraman
- Veendum Chila Veettukaryangal (1999)
- Chandranudikkunna Dikkil (1999)
- Narasimham (2000)
- Mr. Butler (2000) (posthumously)
- Korappan The Great (2001) (posthumously)
- Njan Rajavu (2002) (Posthumously)

== Series ==
- Akashadoothu
- Chirikkam Namukku Chirikkam
