= Ammayum Makalum =

- Directed by: Stanley Jose
- Written by: S. Kanakam
- Screenplay by: S. Kanakam
- Starring: Jayabharathi; Jose; Ambika; Ravikumar
- Cinematography: C. Ramachandra Menon
- Edited by: V. N. Raghupathi
- Music by: Shyam
- Production companies: B&V Productions
- Distributed by: B&V Productions
- Release date: 3 March 1980
- Country: India
- Language: Malayalam

Ammayum Makalum is a 1980 Indian Malayalam-language film, directed by Stanley Jose. The film stars Jayabharathi, Jose, Ambika, and Ravikumar in the lead roles. The film features a musical score by Shyam.

== Cast ==
- Jayabharathi as Bharathi
- Jose as Raju
- Ambika as Radha
- Ravikumar as Ravi
- Seema as Ramani
- Sukumari as Madhavi
- Jagathy Sreekumar as Sankunni
- Sreelatha Namboothiri as Kalyani
- Adoor Pankajam as Brahannala
- Chandraji as Madhavi's father
- K. P. Ummer as Kurup, Anandan (double role)
- Lalu Alex as Vasu
- Meena as Lakshmi
- Adoor Bhasi as Gopalan

== Soundtrack ==
The music was composed by Shyam, and the lyrics were written by O. N. V. Kurup.

No.	Song	Singers	Lyrics	Length (m:ss)
1	"Kuyile"	S. Janaki	O. N. V. Kurup	
2	"Priya Sakhi"	Jolly Abraham	O. N. V. Kurup	
3	"Thathammappenninum"	S. Janaki	O. N. V. Kurup	
4	"Verukal"	Chorus, Jency, Jolly Abraham	O. N. V. Kurup	
