= K. G. Rajasekharan =

Indian film director (1947–2019)

- Born: February 14, 1947; Thiruvananthapuram
- Died: 21 March 2019 (Aged 72); Valsaravakkam, Chennai
- Occupation: director
- Years active: 1968–1990
- Spouse: Ambili Rajasekharan

Kadakathuveettil Govindakurup Rajasekharan (February 14, 1947 – March 21, 2019) was an Indian film director in Malayalam movies. He had directed 20 Malayalam movies. He directed his debut movie Padmatheertham in 1978.

== Personal life ==
He was born to Edava Kurunilakode Kadakathuveettil Govinda Kuruppu and J Kamalaksiyamma on 12 February 1947. He completed B.Sc. from Kollam S.N. College. He started his movie career as an assistant director in the movie Midumidukki in 1968.

== Filmography ==
=== Direction ===
- Padmatheertham (1978)
- Velluvili (1978)
- Indradhanussu (1979)
- Yakshippaaru (1979)
- Vaaleduthavan Vaalaal (1979)
- Vijayam Nammude Senaani (1979)
- Thirayum Theeravum (1980)
- Ival Ee Vazhi Ithu vare (1980)
- Anthappuram (1980)
- Avan Oru Ahankaari (1980)
- Saahasam (1981)
- Paanchajanyam (1982)
- Maattuvin Chattangale (1982)
- Chambalkaadu (1982)
- Beedikkunjamma (1982)
- Shaari Alla Shaarada (1982)
- Mynaakam (1984)
- Chillukottaram (1985)
- Thozhil Allengil Jail (1985)
- Simhadhwani (1992)

=== Story ===
- Yakshippaaru (1979)

=== Screenplay ===
- Anthappuram (1980)
