= Bichu Thirumala =

Indian lyricist and poet (1942–2021)

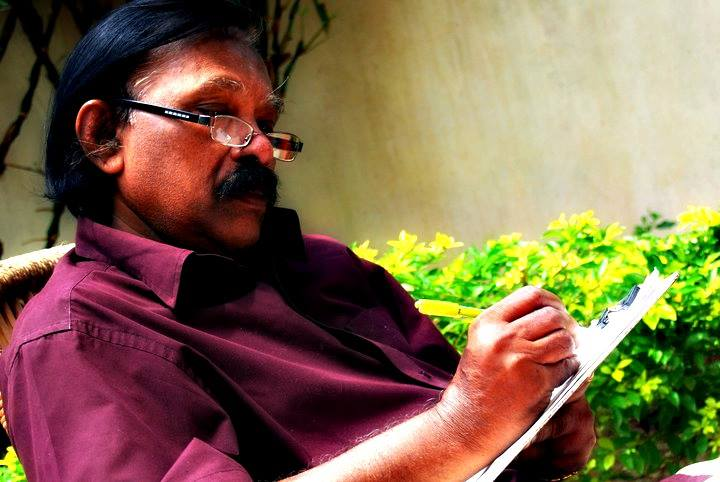
- Born: B. Sivasankaran Nair; 13 February 1942; Thiruvananthapuram, Travancore, British India
- Died: 26 November 2021 (aged 79); Thiruvananthapuram, Kerala, India
- Occupations: Lyricist; poet
- Years active: 1972–2021
- Spouse: Prasanna Kumari
- Children: Suman Bichu
- Awards: Kerala State Film Award; Critics Award; Film Fans Award; Stallion International Award; Vamadevan Award; Sree Chithirathirunal Award; P.Bhaskaran Award

Bhaskaran Sivasankaran Nair (13 February 1942 – 26 November 2021), better known by his stage name Bichu Thirumala, was an Indian lyricist and poet who worked predominantly in Malayalam cinema. He wrote lyrics for a number of composers and won the Kerala State Film Award for Best Lyricist twice.

== Personal life ==
Bichu Thirumala was born as B. Sivasankaran Nair, to C. G. Bhaskaran Nair and Parukutty Amma of Sasthamangalam Pattanikkunnu house in Thirumala, Thiruvananthapuram.

Sivasankaran was the eldest of eight children born to Parameswaran Nair and Shanthakumari Amma. His siblings included singer Susheela Devi and music director Darshan Raman. He graduated with a Bachelor of Arts degree from University College, Thiruvananthapuram. He was married to Prasanna (who retired as a finance officer of Kerala Water Authority), and their son, Suman Bichu, is a music director.

== Career ==
Bichu Thirumala made his debut as a lyricist with the Malayalam film Bhaja Govindam (1972), directed by C. R. K. Nair, with music composed by Jaya–Vijaya. He subsequently became one of Malayalam cinema's leading lyricists, writing songs for composers including Shyam, A. T. Ummer, Raveendran, G. Devarajan, and Ilaiyaraaja. During the 1970s, he collaborated extensively with Ummer. He also wrote the lyrics for A. R. Rahman's first Malayalam film soundtrack, Yodha (1992), and the advertising jingle "Manam Pole Mangalyam" for Remanika.

Bichu wrote the song "Olathumbathirunnu" from Pappayude Swantham Appoos in memory of his younger brother Balagopalan, who died at a young age.

Although his debut film, Bhaja Govindam, was never released, its song "Brahma Muhoorthathil" gained popularity as a lalitha ganam (light music) and was regularly broadcast by Radio Ceylon during the early 1970s.

In addition to film songs, Bichu wrote Christian devotional music. His notable works include Parishudha Gaanangal, an album released by Tharangini Records, which featured the Christmas song "Pulkudilil Kalthottiyil" and "Niranam Palayoor", a song about the seven-and-a-half ancient churches of Kerala.

== Death ==
Following a serious accident at his home in 1994, Bichu Thirumala's songwriting career declined. He was admitted to S. K. Hospital in Thiruvananthapuram with breathing difficulties and suffered a heart attack. After being placed on ventilator support, he died on 26 November 2021 at the age of 79. He was cremated with full state honours at Santhikavadam Crematorium in Thiruvananthapuram and was survived by his wife and son.

== Awards ==
Kerala State Film Award for Best Lyricist
Year	Movie	Song	Composer
1981	Thrishna	-	Shyam
1981	Thenum Vayampum	-	Raveendran
1991	Kadinjool Kalyanam		Raveendran

=== Other awards ===
- Critics Award
- Film Fans Award
- Stallion International Award
- Vamadevan Award
- Sree Chithirathirunal Award
- P.Bhaskaran Award
