= Ambili (singer) =

Indian singer

Ambili (Singer)
- Born: Padmaja Thampi; Thiruvananthapuram, Kerala, India
- Genres: Playback singing, Carnatic music
- Instrument: Vocals
- Years active: 1970–1987
- Label: Audiotracs

Ambili is an Indian film singer in Malayalam cinema who was active during the 1970s and 1980s. She has sung more than 3000 songs in 800 films. She has sung in Tamil, Hindi and Bengali. Her popular songs are "Thedi varum kannukalil", "Oonjala, oonjala", "Swarnamalakal", "Maayalle raga mazhaville" and "Guruvayoorappante thiruvamruthethinu".

== Personal life ==
Padmaja Thampi, known as Ambili, was born as the youngest among five children to R C Thampi and Sukumari at Thiruvananthapuram. Her father was a military officer who later became a teacher and her mother was a singer. She has three brothers and a sister. She had her education from Fathma College and Delhi University. She had learnt music from Mr. V. Dakshina Murthy. Her debut song was "Karagre vasathe" from the movie Sabarimala Sree Dharmashaastha in 1970. She is married to K G Rajashekharan, a Malayalam film director. They have a son, Raghavendran, and a daughter, Ranjini. She started her own music troop, Mayambu, and performed for stage programs and albums. She received Kala Rathnam Title and Best Singer Award from Kerala Devaswom Board. She currently resides at Chennai with family. She is a recipient of Global NSS (Nair Service Society) award in 2017.
