= List of Malayalam songs recorded by K. S. Chithra =

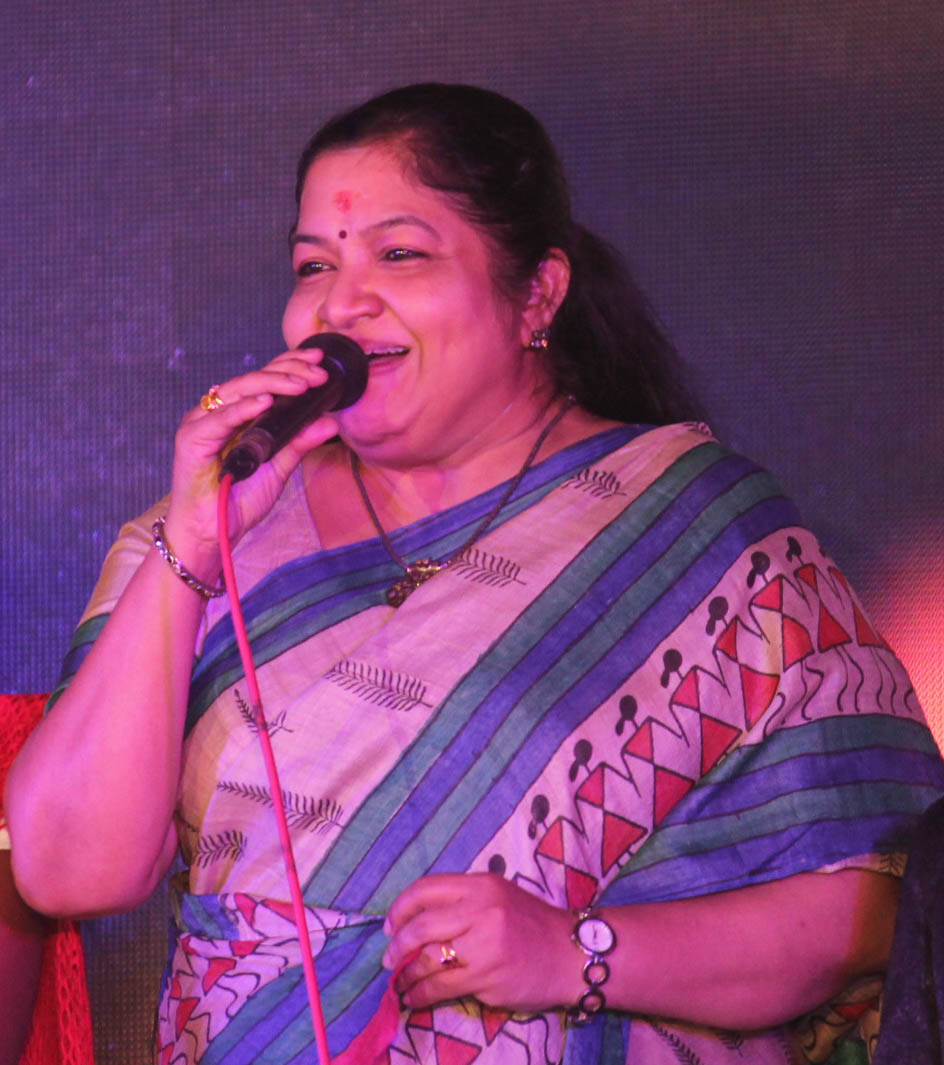
Chithra in 2015

K. S. Chithra was introduced to Malayalam playback by M. G. Radhakrishnan in 1979 who recorded her voice for films and private albums. Attahasam, Snehapoorvam Meera and Njan Ekananu were the first few films in which she recorded her voice. She also performed live concerts with K. J. Yesudas in India and abroad. The song "Manjal Prasadavum" from the film Nakhakshathangal (1986) composed by Bombay Ravi got her the second National Film Award for Best Female Playback Singer. For the same composer, she sang the song "Indupushpam Choodi Nilkum" for the film Vaishali (1989) and won her third National Film Award. Her first Kerala State Film Award for Best Singer was for the song "Poomaname" from the film Nirakkoottu (1985) composed by Shyam. Since then, she has earned wide recognition by singing popular songs under the compositions of Raveendran, Shyam, S. P. Venkitesh, Mohan Sithara, Salil Chowdhury, Kannur Rajan, Ilaiyaraaja, Johnson, Ouseppachan, M. K. Arjunan, A. T. Ummer, Berny Ignatius, M. B. Sreenivasan, Mohan Sithara, Vidyasagar, Ramesh Narayan, Sharreth, M. Jayachandran and Deepak Dev. She is regarded as "Nightingale of Kerala (Vanambadi)" and recorded many successful songs in Malayalam. She recorded a number of songs for the composer S. P. Venkitesh and her maximum duet songs in Malayalam are with K. J. Yesudas and M. G. Sreekumar. As of 2017, she has won the Kerala State Awards for the record 16 times. Her latest song "Theerame" from the movie Malik (2021) became another hit in Malayalam Music Industry.

== Kerala State government honours ==
- 2014 – Vanita Ratnam Award (Kamala Surayya Award) by Government of Kerala for Social Welfare Department
- 2018 - Harivarasanam Award by the Government of Kerala

== Malayalam songs ==
This is an incomplete list

Year	Film	Song	Composer(s)	Writer(s)	Co-artist(s)	Remarks
1979	Kummatty	"Muthassikkadhayile"	M. G. Radhakrishnan; Kavalam Narayana Panicker	Kavalam Narayana Panicker	Manju, Asha, Usha	
1982	Aasha	"Aashe Aare Chaare"	A. T. Ummer	Dr. Pavithran	K. J. Yesudas, K. S. Beena, Chorus	
1982	Kelkkaatha Sabdham	"Maanikyam"	Johnson	Devadas	K. J. Yesudas	
1982	Njan Ekananu	"Rajani Parayu"	M. G. Radhakrishnan	Sathyan Anthikad	solo	
1982	Njan Ekananu	"Pranaya Vasantham"	M. G. Radhakrishnan	Sathyan Anthikad	K. J. Yesudas	
1982	Novemberinte Nashtam	"Arikilo Akaleyo"	M. G. Radhakrishnan	Poovachal Khader	Arundhathi	
1982	Novemberinte Nashtam	"Arikilo Akaleyo" (record version)	M. G. Radhakrishnan	Poovachal Khader	M. G. Sreekumar, Arundhati	
1982	Snehapoorvam Meera	"Enthu Mama Sadanathil"	M. G. Radhakrishnan		K. S. Beena	
1983	Ente Mamattukkuttiyammakku	"Aalorungi Arangorungi"	Jerry Amaldev	Bichu Thirumala	solo	
1983	Ente Mamattukkuttiyammakku	"Thaimanikkunju Thennal"	Jerry Amaldev	Bichu Thirumala	chorus	
1983	Mounaraagam	"Gaaname Unaroo Dukha"	K. J. Yesudas	Sreekumaran Thampi	solo	
1983	Rathilayam	"Kadalilum Karayilum"	M. G. Radhakrishnan	Poovachal Khader	K. G. Markose	
1984	Arante Mulla Kochu Mulla	"Kaattil Kodum Kaattil"	Alleppey Ranganath	Madhu Alappuzha	K. J. Yesudas	
1984	Arante Mulla Kochu Mulla	"Ponthaamarakal Poothulayum"	Alleppey Ranganath	Madhu Alappuzha	K. J. Yesudas	
1985	Parayanumvayya Parayathirikkanumvayya	"Kannil Virinju Moham"	M. G. Radhakrishnan	Chunakkara Ramankutty	M. G. Sreekumar	
1985	Ente Kaanakkuyil	"Malarithal"	A. J. Joseph	K. Jayakumar	K. J. Yesudas	
1985	Ente Kaanakkuyil	"Ore Swaram"	A. J. Joseph	K. Jayakumar		
1985	Nirakkoottu	"Poomaaname"	Shyam	Poovachal Khader	G. Venugopal,K. G. Markose	Kerala State Film Awards
1985	Nokkethadhoorathu Kannum Nattu	"Aaraadhana Nisha Sangeethamela"	Jerry Amaldev	Bichu Thirumala	K. J. Yesudas	
1985	Nokkethadhoorathu Kannum Nattu	"Aayiram Kannumaay"	Jerry Amaldev	Bichu Thirumala		
1985	Nokkethadhoorathu Kannum Nattu	"Kiliye Kiliye"	Jerry Amaldev	Bichu Thirumala		
1985	Makan Ente Makan	"Aaromale En Aaromale"	Johnson	Poovachal Khader	K. J. Yesudas	
1985	Katha Ithuvare	"Mazhavillin Malarthedi"	Johnson	Poovachal Khader	K. J. Yesudas	
1985	Katha Ithuvare	"Ragini Ragaroopini"	Johnson	Poovachal Khader	K. J. Yesudas	
1985	Upaharam	"Aalolamaadunna"	Johnson	Shibu Chakravarthy		
1985	Aa Neram Alppa Dooram	"Akaleyaay Kilipaadukayaayi"	Johnson	Poovachal Khader		
1986	Ayalvasi Oru Daridravasi	"Swarangalaay"	M. G. Radhakrishnan	Chunakkara Ramankutty	M. G. Sreekumar	
1986	Geetham	"Hei Kurumpi"	Ravindran	Bichu Thirumala		
1986	Nakhakshathangal	"Manjal Prasaadavum"	Bombay Ravi	O. N. V. Kurup		National Film Award for Best Female Playback Singer,Kerala State Film Awards
1986	Oru Katha Oru Nunakkatha	"Ariyaathe Ariyaathe"	Johnson	M. D. Rajendran		
1986	Ice Cream	"Nedanai Puthiyoru Lokam"	Johnson	Poovachal Khader	Lathika	
1986	Ice Cream	"Thaarunyam Kinaavu Neyyunnu"	Johnson	Poovachal Khader	Lathika	
1987	Sarvakalashala	"Panineerppoovithalil"	M. G. Radhakrishnan	Kavalam Narayana Panicker	K. J. Yesudas	
1987	Jaalakam	"Unni Urangaariraro"	M. G. Radhakrishnan	O. N. V. Kurup		
1987	Ezhuthapurangal	"Paaduvaanaay Vannu"	Johnson	O. N. V. Kurup	K. J. Yesudas, Nedumudi Venu	
1987	Ezhuthapurangal	"Thaalolam Paithal"	Johnson	O. N. V. Kurup		Kerala State Film Awards
1987	Eenam Maranna Kattu	"Eenam marannakatte"				
1987	Sruthi	"Leelaaravindam"	Johnson	Balachandran Chullikkad		
1987	Athinumappuram	"Kalyaana Roopanaakum"	Johnson	Poovachal Khader		
1987	Athinumappuram	"Madhumaasam Manninte"	Johnson	Poovachal Khader	P. Jayachandran	
1988	Ponmuttayidunna Tharavu	"Kunnimani Cheppu"	Johnson	O. N. V. Kurup		
1989	Vaisali	"Indupushpam Choodi Nilkum Raathri"	Bombay Ravi	O. N. V. Kurup		National Film Award for Best Female Playback Singer,Kerala State Film Awards
1989	Vaisali	"Indraneelimayolum"	Bombay Ravi	O. N. V. Kurup		
1989	Vaisali	"Poomullakkaattil"	Bombay Ravi	O. N. V. Kurup		
1989	Vaisali	"Theduvathethoru"	Bombay Ravi	O. N. V. Kurup		
1989	Oru Vadakkan Veeragatha	"Kalarivilakku Thelinjathaano"	Bombay Ravi	K. Jayakumar		Kerala State Film Awards
1989	Oru Vadakkan Veeragatha	"Unni Ganapathi Thamburaane"	Bombay Ravi	Kaithapram	Asha Latha	
1989	Mazhavilkavadi	"Thankathoni"	Johnson	Kaithapram		
1989	Peruvannapurathe Visheshangal	"Pulkkodithan Chundathu Peythoru"	Johnson	P.K. Gopi		
1989	Varavelpu	"Doore Doore Sagaram Thedi"	Johnson	Kaithapram		
1989	Artham	"Shyaamambaram Neele"	Johnson	Kaithapram		
1989	Dasharatham	"Mandaara Cheppundo"	Johnson	Poovachal Khader	M. G. Sreekumar	

=== 1990s ===
Year	Film	Song	Composer(s)	Writer(s)	Co-artist(s)	Remarks
1990	Innale	"Kannil Nin Meyyil"	Perumbavoor G. Raveendranath	Kaithapram Damodaran Namboothiri		
1990	Innale	"Nee Vin Poo Pol"	Perumbavoor G. Raveendranath	Kaithapram Damodaran Namboothiri	K. J. Yesudas	
1990	Njan Gandharvan	"Paalapoove"	Johnson	Kaithapram Damodaran Namboothiri		Kerala State Film Awards
1990	Nanmaniranjavan Sreenivasan	" Kanni Kavadi Poonirangal "	Johnson	Kavalam Narayana Panicker	G.Venugopal	
1990	Pavakkoothu	"Kaamini Mullakal"	Johnson	K. Jayakumar		
1990	Varthamana Kalam	"Paadunna Ganathin"	Johnson	Sreekumaran Thampi		
1990	Varthamana Kalam	"Paadunna Ganathin"(Sad)	Johnson	Sreekumaran Thampi		
1990	Shubhayathra	"Kinaavinte Koodin"	Johnson	P. K. Gopi		
1990	Shubhayathra	"Mizhiyilenthe"	Johnson	P. K. Gopi	G. Venugopal	
1991	Keli	"Thaaram Vaalkannaadi Nokki"	Bharathan	Kaithapram Damodaran Namboothiri		Kerala State Film Awards
1991	Santhwanam	"Swarakanyakamaar"	Mohan Sithara	Kaithapram Damodaran Namboothiri		
1991	Santhwanam	"Unni Vaavavo"	Mohan Sithara	Kaithapram Damodaran Namboothiri		
1992	Adhwaytham	"Mazhavilkkothumbil"	M. G. Radhakrishnan	Kaithapram Damodaran Namboothiri	M. G. Sreekumar	
1992	Adhwaytham	"Ambalappuzhe"	M. G. Radhakrishnan	Kaithapram Damodaran Namboothiri	M. G. Sreekumar	
1992	Adhwaytham	"Krishna Krishna"	M. G. Radhakrishnan	Kaithapram Damodaran Namboothiri		
1992	Oohakachavadam	"Engo Thaazhvarakkattile"	M. G. Radhakrishnan	Kala Adoor		
1992	Savidham	"Poonthennale"	Johnson	Kaithapram Damodaran Namboothiri		
1992	Savidham	"Mounasarovara"	Johnson	Kaithapram Damodaran Namboothiri		Kerala State Film Awards
1993	Manichitrathazhu	"Varuvaanillarumee"	M. G. Radhakrishnan	Madhu Muttam		
1993	Manichitrathazhu	"Akkuthikkuthanakkombil"	M. G. Radhakrishnan	Bichu Thirumala	G. Venugopal, Sujatha Mohan, M. G. Radhakrishnan	
1993	Manichitrathazhu	"Oru Murai Vanthu"	M. G. Radhakrishnan	Vaali (Tamil), Bichu Thirumala	K. J. Yesudas	
1993	Devaasuram	"Angopangam"	M. G. Radhakrishnan	Gireesh Puthenchery		
1993	Devaasuram	"Sree Paadam"	M. G. Radhakrishnan	Gireesh Puthenchery		
1993	Chamayam	"Ragadevanum"	Johnson	Kaithapram Damodaran	M. G. Sreekumar	
1993	Chamayam	"Raja Hamsame Mazhavil"	Johnson	Kaithapram Damodaran		
1993	Sopanam	"Sadhinchene"	S. P. Venkatesh	Tyagaraja	K. J. Yesudas, T. N. Seshagopalan, K. S. Chithra, Manju Menon	
1993	Sopanam	"Sogasuga Mrudanga Talamu"	S. P. Venkatesh	Tyagaraja	K. J. Yesudas, Manju Menon	
1993	Sopanam	"Pon Meghame"	S. P. Venkatesh	Kaithapram Damodaran		Kerala State Film Awards
1993	Ghazal	"Iniyumundoru Janmam"	Bombay Ravi	Yusuf Ali Kechery	K. J. Yesudas	
1993	Ghazal	"Isal thenkanam"	Bombay Ravi	Yusuf Ali Kechery	K. J. Yesudas	
1993	Ghazal	"Vadakku Ninnu Padivanna"	Bombay Ravi	Yusuf Ali Kechery	K. J. Yesudas	
1993	Ghazal	"Sangeethame Ninte"	Bombay Ravi	Yusuf Ali Kechery		
1994	Kashmeeram	"Poru Nee Vaarilam"	M. G. Radhakrishnan	Gireesh Puthenchery		
1994	Parinayam	"Vaishakha Pournamiyo"	Bombay Ravi	Yusuf Ali Kechery		
1994	Parinayam	"Shanthakaram"	Bombay Ravi	Yusuf Ali Kechery		
1994	Parinayam	"Samaja Sancharini"	Bombay Ravi	Yusuf Ali Kechery		
1994	Parinayam	"Parvanendu Mukhi"	Bombay Ravi	Yusuf Ali Kechery		Kerala State Film Awards
1995	Agnidevan	"Saama Gaana"	M. G. Radhakrishnan	Gireesh Puthenchery	M. G. Sreekumar	
1996	Azhakiya Ravanan	"O Dilruba "	Vidyasagar	Kaithapram Damodaran Namboothiri	Hariharan	
1996	Azhakiya Ravanan	"Vennila Chandana"	Vidyasagar	Kaithapram Damodaran Namboothiri		
1996	Indraprastham	"Thanka Thinkal"	Vidyasagar		M. G. Sreekumar	
1996	Devaraagam	"Devaraagam"	M. M. Keeravani	M. D. Rajendran	M. M. Keeravani, Master Don Vincent	
1996	Devaraagam	"Shishirakaala Meghamidhuna"	M. M. Keeravani	M. D. Rajendran	P. Jayachandran	
1996	Devaraagam	"Ya Ya Ya Yadava"	M. M. Keeravani	M. D. Rajendran	P. Unnikrishnan	
1996	Devaraagam	"Shashikala Chaarthiya"	M. M. Keeravani	M. D. Rajendran	P. Jayachandran	Kerala State Film Awards
1997	Varnapakittu	"Aakashangalil"	Vidyasagar	Gireesh Puthenchery		
1997	Varnapakittu	"Velli Nila"	Vidyasagar	Gireesh Puthenchery	M. G. Sreekumar	
1997	Varnapakittu	"Doore Mamarakkombil"	Vidyasagar	Gireesh Puthenchery		
1997	Varnapakittu	"Anupama Sneha Chaithanyame"	Vidyasagar	Jose Kallukulam		
1997	Krishnagudiyil Oru Pranayakalathu	"Kaathiruppoo"	Vidyasagar	Gireesh Puthenchery	K. J. Yesudas	
1997	Krishnagudiyil Oru Pranayakalathu	"Pinneyum Pinneyum"	Vidyasagar	Gireesh Puthenchery		
1998	Rakthasakshikal Sindabad	"Nammalu Koyyum"	M. G. Radhakrishnan	O. N. V. Kurup	M. G. Sreekumar, Chorus	
1998	Rakthasakshikal Sindabad	"Ponnaaryan Paadam"	M. G. Radhakrishnan	Gireesh Puthenchery		
1998	Rakthasakshikal Sindabad	"Vaikaasithennalo"	M. G. Radhakrishnan	Gireesh Puthenchery	M. G. Sreekumar	
1998	Oru Maravathoor Kanavu	"Kanninila"	Vidyasagar	Gireesh Puthenchery	Chorus	
1998	Oru Maravathoor Kanavu	"Karunaamayane"	Vidyasagar	Gireesh Puthenchery		
1998	Oru Maravathoor Kanavu	"Mohamaay"	Vidyasagar	Gireesh Puthenchery	Raveendran	
1998	Oru Maravathoor Kanavu	"Pandengadee Naattil"	Vidyasagar	Gireesh Puthenchery	Chorus	
1998	Oru Maravathoor Kanavu	"Thinkalkkuri"	Raveendran	Gireesh Puthenchery	Raveendran,Devanand	
1998	Pranayavarnangal	"Kannadi Koodum"	Vidyasagar	Gireesh Puthenchery	K. J. Yesudas	
1998	Pranayavarnangal	"Othiri Othiri"	Vidyasagar	Gireesh Puthenchery		
1998	Pranayavarnangal	"Aaro Viral Neetti"	Vidyasagar	Gireesh Puthenchery		
1998	Elavamkodu Desam	"Engu Ninnengu Ninnu"	Vidyasagar	Gireesh Puthenchery	K. J. Yesudas	
1998	Elavamkodu Desam	"Chembakamalaroli"	Vidyasagar	Gireesh Puthenchery	K. J. Yesudas	
1998	Elavamkodu Desam	"Aadukal Meyunna"	Vidyasagar	Gireesh Puthenchery		
1998	Sidhartha	"Alliyambalay"	Vidyasagar		M. G. Sreekumar	
1998	Sidhartha	"Mayikayamam"	Vidyasagar		Hariharan	
1998	Sidhartha	"Kaivanna Thankamalle "	Vidyasagar			
1998	Summer in Bethlehem	"Kunnimani Koottil"	Vidyasagar	Gireesh Puthenchery	M. G. Sreekumar	
1998	Summer in Bethlehem	"Oru Raathri Koodi"	Vidyasagar	Gireesh Puthenchery	K. J. Yesudas	
1998	Summer in Bethlehem	"Choolamadichu"	Vidyasagar	Gireesh Puthenchery	chorus	
1998	Summer in Bethlehem	"Poonchillamel"	Vidyasagar	Gireesh Puthenchery	chorus	
1999	Kannezhuthi Pottum Thottu	"Kaithappoovin"	M. G. Radhakrishnan	Kavalam Narayana Panicker	Mohanlal	
1999	Kannezhuthi Pottum Thottu	"Meenakkodikkaate"	M. G. Radhakrishnan	Kavalam Narayana Panicker		
1999	Angene Oru Avadhikkalathu	"Pular Veyilum"	Johnson	Gireesh Puthenchery	M. G. Sreekumar	Kerala State Film Awards
1999	Ezhupunna Tharakan	"Mele Vinnil"	Vidyasagar	Gireesh Puthenchery		
1999	Chandranudikkunna Dikkil	"Maya Devakikku"	Vidyasagar	S. Ramesan Nair	Sriram, Vishwanathan	
1999	Niram	"Minnithennum Nakshathrangal"	Vidyasagar	Gireesh Puthenchery	K. J. Yesudas	
1999	Niram	"Yaathrayaay"	Vidyasagar	Gireesh Puthenchery	K. J. Yesudas,Vidyasagar	

=== 2000s ===
Year	Film	Song	Composer(s)	Writer(s)	Co-artist(s)	Remarks
2000	Pilots	"Poo Poothu Minni Thennum Yaamam"	M. G. Radhakrishnan	Gireesh Puthenchery	K. J. Yesudas	
2000	Narasimham	"Manjin Mutheduthu"	M. G. Radhakrishnan	Gireesh Puthenchery	M. G. Sreekumar	
2000	Dreamz	"Ee Parakkum"	Vidyasagar	Gireesh Puthenchery	K. J. Yesudas	
2000	Sathyam Sivam Sundaram	"Sooryanaay Thazhuki"	Vidyasagar	Kaithapram Damodaran		
2000	Mister Butler	"Virahini Raadhe"	Vidyasagar	Gireesh Puthenchery	K. J. Yesudas	
2000	Mister Butler	"Kunukku Penmaniye"	Vidyasagar	Gireesh Puthenchery	M. G. Sreekumar,Innocent	
2000	Mister Butler	"Raara Venu"	Vidyasagar	Gireesh Puthenchery	Kalyani Menon	
2000	Mister Butler	"Nizhalaadum Deepame"	Vidyasagar	Gireesh Puthenchery		
2000	Mister Butler	"Kadha Paranjurangiya"	Vidyasagar	Yusuf Ali Kecheri		
2000	Mister Butler	"Prabhathathile"	Vidyasagar	Yusuf Ali Kecheri	K. J. Yesudas	
2000	Mister Butler	"Sruthiyamma"	Vidyasagar	Yusuf Ali Kecheri	K. J. Yesudas	
2000	Devadoothan	"Poove Poove"	Vidyasagar	Kaithapram Damodaran Namboothiri	P. Jayachandran	
2001	Achaneyanenikkishtam	"Shalabham Vazhimaarumaa"	M. G. Radhakrishnan	S. Ramesan Nair	M. G. Sreekumar	
2001	Theerthadanam	"Mooli Mooli"	Kaithapram Damodaran Namboothiri	Kaithapram Damodaran Namboothiri		Kerala State Film Awards
2001	Dhosth	"Kilipenne"	Vidyasagar	S. Ramesan Nair	K. J. Yesudas	
2001	Dubai	"Yaduvamsha Yaamini"	Vidyasagar	Gireesh Puthenchery		
2002	Nandanam	"Mouliyil"	Raveendran	Gireesh Puthenchery		
2002	Nandanam	"Karmukil"	Raveendran	Gireesh Puthenchery		Kerala State Film Awards
2002	Meesa Madhavan	"Penne Penne"	Vidyasagar	Gireesh Puthenchery	M. G. Sreekumar, Kalyani Menon.	
2003	Kattu Vannu Vilichappol	"Kaatte Nee"	M. G. Radhakrishnan	Thirunalloor Karunakaran		
2005	Anandabhadram	"Shivamallikaavil"	M. G. Radhakrishnan	Gireesh Puthenchery		
2005	Anandabhadram	"Minnayam Minnum"	M. G. Radhakrishnan	Gireesh Puthenchery		
2005	Nottam	"Mayangi Poyi"	M. Jayachandran	Kaithapram Damodaran		Kerala State Film Awards
2005	Chandrolsavam	"Ponmulam"	Vidyasagar	Gireesh Puthenchery		
2005	Chandrolsavam	"Nijadasavaradha"	Vidyasagar	Patnam Subramania Iyer		
2006	Vadakkumnadhan	"Kalabham Tharaam"	Raveendran	Gireesh Puthenchery		Filmfare Awards South
2006	Vadakkumnadhan	"Oru Kili"	Raveendran	Gireesh Puthenchery	K. J. Yesudas	
2006	Vadakkumnadhan	"Gange"	Raveendran	Gireesh Puthenchery		
2007	Raakilipattu	"Dhum Dhum Dhooreyetho"	Vidyasagar	Gireesh Puthenchery	Sujatha, Sangeetha Sajith	
2007	Raakilipattu	"Omana Thinkal"	Vidyasagar	Gireesh Puthenchery	Sujatha, Sangeetha Sajith	
2007	Raakilipattu	"Saarike Ninne"	Vidyasagar	Gireesh Puthenchery	Sujatha	
2008	Thirakkatha	"Oduvil Oru"	Sharreth	Rafeeq Ahammed		Filmfare Awards South
2009	Pazhassi Raja	"Kunnathae"	Ilaiyaraja	O. N. V. Kurup		Filmfare Awards South

=== 2010s ===
Year	Film	Song	Composer(s)	Writer(s)	Co-artist(s)	Remarks
2013	Pullipulikalum Aattinkuttiyum	"Otta Thumbi"	Vidyasagar	Vayalar Sarath	Shankar Mahadevan	
2013	Oru Indian Pranayakadha	"Shyamameghame"	Vidyasagar	Rafeeq Ahammed		
2016	Thoppil Joppan	"Poovithalai"	Vidyasagar	Vayalar Sarath		
2017	Kambhoji	"Nadavathil"	M. Jayachandran	O. N. V. Kurup		Kerala State Film Awards,Filmfare Awards South
2017	Kambhoji	Chenthar Nermukhi	M. Jayachandran	O. N. V. Kurup	Sreevalsan J Menon	

=== 2020s ===
Year	Film	Song	Composer(s)	Writer(s)	Co-artist(s)	Remarks
2020	Varane Avashyamund	"Ne Va En Arumukha"	Alphons Joseph	Santhosh Varma	Karthik	
2020	Varane Avashyamund	"Kuttikkurumba"	Alphons Joseph	Santhosh Varma		
2021	Mohan Kumar Fans	"Oru Theera Novu (solo)"	Prince George	Jis Joy		
2021	Mohan Kumar Fans	"Oru Theera Novu (duet)"	Prince George	Jis Joy	Abhijith Kollam	
2021	Malik	"Theerame Theerame"	Sushin Shyam	Anwar Ali	Sooraj Santhosh	Filmfare Awards South
2021	Kaalchilambu	"Payyanur Pavitram"	Kaithapram Damodaran Namboothiri	Kaithapram Damodaran Namboothiri		
2021	Kaaval	"Kaarmekham Moodunnu"	Ranjin Raj	B. K. Harinarayanan		
2021	Marakkar: Lion of the Arabian Sea	"Kunju Kunjaali"	Rahul Raj	B. K. Harinarayanan		
2022	Malayankunju	"Ponni Makale"	A. R. Rahman	Vinayak Sasikumar		
2023	Pookkaalam	"Ore Pakal"	Sachin Warrier	Rafeeq Ahamed	Shahabaz Aman	
2023	Pookkaalam	"Vaadunnuvo"	Sachin Warrier	Rafeeq Ahamed	Sachin Warrier	
2023	Neelavelicham	"Anuraga Madhuchashakam"	Bijibal, Rex Vijayan	P. Bhaskaran		
2023	Neelavelicham	"Potthithakarnna Kinavu"	Bijibal, Rex Vijayan	P. Bhaskaran		
2023	Neelavelicham	"Vasantha Panchami"	Bijibal, Rex Vijayan	P. Bhaskaran		
2023	Madhura Manohara Moham	"Thathana Thathana"	Hesham Abdul Wahab	B. K. Harinarayanan	Chorus	
2023	Jawanum Mullapoovum	"Muttathe Mulla"	Biby Mathew	Suresh Krishnan		Filmfare Awards South
2024	Iyer in Arabia	"Parayaathe Parayunnathellam"	Anand Madhusoodhanan	Prabha Varma	Shahabaz Aman	
2024	Aanandhapuram Diaries	"Aaru Nee Kanmani"	Albert Vijayan	Rafeeq Ahamed		
2024	Varshangalkku Shesham	"Jeevithagaadhakale"	Amrit Ramnath	Vaisakh Sugunan	Sreevalsan J. Menon, Mithun Jayaraj	
2025	Anpodu Kanmani	"Mazhananavariyum"	Samuel Aby	Manu Manjith		
2025	Ponman	"Paka"	Justin Varghese	Suhail Koya	Justin Varghese	
2025	Randaam Yaamam	"Melle Vannu Priyan"	Mohan Sithara	Nemom Pushparaj		
2025	PDC Athra Cheriya Degree Alla	"Manju Moodiya Thazhvarayil"	Firos Nadh	Illiyas Kadameri	Firos Nadh	
2025	Vala: Story of a Bangle	"Arike"	Govind Vasantha	Rafeeq Ahamed		
2026	Magic Mushrooms	"Aaraane Aaraane"	Nadirshah	Rajeev Govindan	Rimi Tomy	
