= Vida Parayum Munpe =

1981 Malayalam film directed by Mohan

- Theatrical release poster
- Directed by: Mohan
- Written by: John Paul; Mohan (dialogues)
- Screenplay by: John Paul
- Produced by: Innocent; David Kachappilli
- Starring: Prem Nazir; Nedumudi Venu; Lakshmi; Innocent
- Cinematography: U. Rajagopal
- Edited by: G. Venkittaraman
- Music by: M. B. Sreenivasan
- Production company: Sathru Films
- Distributed by: Sathru Films
- Release date: 10 September 1981
- Country: India
- Language: Malayalam

Vida Parayum Munpe (transl. Before the Final Adieu) is a 1981 Malayalam-language drama film directed by Mohan, written by John Paul and produced by Innocent and David Kachappilli. The film stars Prem Nazir and Nedumudi Venu in lead roles, while Lakshmi, Innocent, Bharath Gopy, and Sankaradi play supporting roles. The film is a loose adaptation of the Hrishikesh Mukherjee's 1971 Anand, which was itself an adaptation of Akira Kurosawa's 1952 classic Ikiru.

The film was produced and distributed by Innocent and David Kachappilli under the banner of Sathru Films, in their first production venture. They would go on to produce K. G. George's Lekhayude Maranam Oru Flashback. The film features original songs composed by M. B. Sreenivasan, with lyrics written by Kavalam Narayana Panicker. The cinematography of the film was done by U. Rajagopal, while the editing was done by G. Venkittaraman.

The film premiered at the Lulu Theatre on 10 September 1981 to widespread critical acclaim. The film was a commercial success and went on to become the third highest-grossing Malayalam film of the year. The film won four Kerala State Film Awards: Second Best Film, Best Actor for Nedumudi Venu, Best Music Director for M. B. Sreenivasan, and Special Jury Award for Nazir. Nedumudi Venu also won the Filmfare Award for Best Actor for his performance in the film. The film was screened at the 26th International Film Festival of Kerala in the Unforgettable Venuchettan section on 19 March 2022.

== Cast ==
- Prem Nazir as Madhavan Kutty
- Nedumudi Venu as Xavier
- Lakshmi as Sudha
- Innocent as Varghese
- Beena as Omana
- Sankaradi as Panicker
- Bharath Gopi as Dr. Thomas
- John Varghese as Father
- Lalithasree as Sudha's friend
- Master Sujith as Prasad
- P. R. Menon as Elderly Pensioner
- Ravi Menon as Manoharan
- Santhakumari as Janaki
- Sulekha as Typist

== Production ==
=== Development ===
In an interview with Onmanorama Innocent, the producer of the film says that: "John Paul has been there with me right from the beginning of my film career. Once David Kachapally and I decided to produce a film directed by Mohan. The writer was there at the Trissur bus stand and it was my duty to pick him up. Mohan had correctly described him to me. But within minutes after meeting him, we felt like we knew each other for a long time. That meeting resulted in Vida Parayum Munpe. Then we produced Bharathan's Ormmakkayi. It was John who told me to do the role of a Church verger in Kathodu Kathoram. In life, we will meet certain people whom we want to emulate. John Paul was one such man."

=== Casting ===
Nedumudi Venu first saw the director when he was editing Sujatha, the Tamil remake of Shalini Ente Koottukari, at Vijaya Vauhini Studios in Madras. Mohan writes in his memoirs, that: "John Paul had recommended Venu for the role of Xavier. Nedumudi Venu came to see me wearing a saffron dhoti with beard and hair that wasn't the form I wanted for the character of Xavier in my film but the height and weight were exactly the same moreover, I had already seen Thakara and had already decided that Venu would do the role of Xavier that's why we didn't have a conversation about his attire." Nedumudi Venu was who suggested Bharat Gopy for the role of Dr. Thomas. Bharat Gopy had by then only acted in art-house films. John Paul, in his memoirs on Bharat Gopy, recalls how Bharat Gopy was apprehensive of acting in the film, along with Prem Nazir. He somehow had this pre-conceived notion that it would be virtually impossible to get along with a star. But Prem Nazir turned out to be a true gentleman, to the point of even inquiring about Gopy's relatives back in Chirayinkeezhu. The role of Madhavan Kutty played by Prem Nazir was initially planned to be given to Sukumaran, who was a regular in Mohan's films however it was eventually given to Prem Nazir.

== Soundtrack ==
The music was composed by M. B. Sreenivasan and the lyrics were written by Kavalam Narayana Panicker.

No.	Song	Singers	Lyrics
1	"Anantha Snehathin"	K. J. Yesudas, Chorus	Kavalam Narayana Panicker
2	"Ullala Chillala"	K. J. Yesudas	Kavalam Narayana Panicker

== Release ==
The Lulu and Mymoon theatres were inaugurated a week prior to the scheduled release of Vida Parayum Munpe. The owner of the theatres, Siyad Koker wanted the film to premiere the film as the opening film of the Lulu and Mymoon theatres. The producers of the film was initially reluctant as if the film received negative reviews from critics the film would fail at the box office. However, on the insistence of Mohan they agreed and the film was released as the opening film of the Lulu and Mymoon theatres.

== Reception ==
=== Critical response ===
P. K. Ajith Kumar of The Hindu rated Nedumudi Venu's performance in the film as one of the best in his career, writing: "Mohan, a director who has contributed greatly to Malayalam cinema during its golden period in the 1980s, often brought the best out of Venu. This film had the actor playing a young man who successfully hides the pains of his life from his colleagues."

=== Box office ===
Expectations for Vida Parayum Munpe were low. But defying expectations it was a commercial success. The film was declared a hit at the box office in its lifetime run. However, despite the film being an audience favorite, the film was unexpectedly withdrawn from theatres on the 95th day due to a fight between the distributors and theatre owners. The film was replaced by another film in theatres in retaliation for the distributors' refusal to give the film as their next release in another theatre. Regarding the incident director Mohan in an interview with a Magazine says:

"The incident had caused great disappointment and pain to all the crew members of the film. The shields to be presented on the 100th day had been prepared. For a long time, the shields prepared for the 100th-day anniversary celebrations had been lying in the corner of the verandah of the flat in Mahalingpur, which we had used as an office."

— Mohan, Madhyamik Weekly
