= Kathayariyathe =

- Directed by: Mohan
- Written by: John Paul
- Screenplay by: John Paul
- Produced by: A. Raghunath
- Starring: Srividya; Sukumaran; MG Soman; Ranipadmini
- Cinematography: U. Rajagopal
- Edited by: G. Venkittaraman
- Music by: G. Devarajan
- Production company: Sanjay Productions
- Distributed by: Sanjay Productions
- Release date: 12 March 1981
- Country: India
- Language: Malayalam

Kathayariyathe (Without Knowing The Story) is a 1981 Indian Malayalam film, directed by Mohan and produced by A. Raghunath. The film stars Srividya, Sukumaran, M. G. Soman and Ranipadmini in the lead roles. The film has musical score by G. Devarajan.

== Cast ==
- Srividya as Geetha
- Sukumaran as Vishnu
- M. G. Soman as Viswanathan
- Ranipadmini as Usha
- Sai Kumar as Shaji
- Reghu as Gopi
- bahadoor as Raman Nair

== Soundtrack ==
The music was composed by G. Devarajan and the lyrics were written by M. D. Rajendran.

No.	Song	Singers	Lyrics	Length (m:ss)
1	"Nirangal Nirangal"	Latha Raju	M. D. Rajendran	
2	"Pottichirikkunna Nimishangale"	Latha Raju	M. D. Rajendran	
3	"Thaaranikkunnukal"	Sherin Peters	M. D. Rajendran	
