= Unnikrishnante Adyathe Christmas =

- Directed by: Kamal
- Screenplay by: Kaloor Dennis; John Paul
- Story by: Kakkanadan
- Produced by: Kitho
- Starring: Jayaram; Suresh Gopi; Sumalatha
- Cinematography: B. Vasanthkumar
- Edited by: K. Rajagopal
- Music by: Johnson
- Production company: Chithra Pournami
- Distributed by: Rachana Pictures
- Release date: 24 December 1988
- Country: India
- Language: Malayalam

Unnikrishnante Aadyathe Christmas is a 1988 Indian Malayalam film, directed by Kamal, produced by Kitho, and scripted by John Paul and Kaloor Dennis. The film stars Jayaram, Suresh Gopi, Sumalatha, and Innocent. The film is based on a short story by Kakkanadan.

== Plot ==
Sophia has not been home since a rift with her parents over her marriage to Josekutty. Sophia's father, Ittichan, and ailing mother request Unnikrishan, a close friend, to find Sophia and bring her home to them. Unnikrishnan promises the parents that he will bring Sophia home by Christmas. With the help of his old schoolmate, Parasuraman, Unnikrishnan finds Sophia. Sophia, who is working in a hotel owned by Paul Kallookkaran, claims not to know Unnikrishnan, who is also met with hostility by Paul. Unnikrishan persists and learns that Josekutty is dead and Sophia is trapped in a dire situation. She is pretending not to know Unnikrishnan to protect him and herself. He tries to help Sophia escape, but tragedy ensues.

== Cast ==
- Jayaram as Unnikrishnan
- Sumalatha as Sophia
- Suresh Gopi as Parasuraman
- Sukumaran as Paul Kallookkaran
- Lizy as Sridevi
- Nedumudi Venu as Ittichan
- Kaviyoor Ponnamma as Aliyamma
- Mala Aravindan as Swamy
- Thodupuzha Vasanthi as Sophia
- Innocent as Georgekutty
- Devan as Josekutty
- Valsala Menon as Parvathiyamma
- Lalitha Sree as Subhadra
- Lalu Alex as Dasan

== Soundtrack ==
The music was composed by Johnson, and the lyrics were written by Sreekumaran Thampi.

Song	Singers
"Ormakal Valarnnu"	K. J. Yesudas
"Ormakal Valarnnu"	Lathika
