= Mizhineerppoovukal =

- Poster
- Directed by: Kamal
- Written by: John Paul
- Produced by: R. S. Sreenivasan
- Starring: Mohanlal; Urvasi
- Cinematography: Vipin Mohan
- Edited by: T. R. Sekhar
- Music by: M. K. Arjunan
- Production company: Sree Sai Productions
- Distributed by: Central Pictures
- Release date: 19 June 1986
- Country: India
- Language: Malayalam

Mizhineerppoovukal (transl. Teardrop flowers) is a 1986 Indian Malayalam-language drama film directed by Kamal (in his directorial debut) and written by John Paul, starring Mohanlal and Urvasi. The music was composed by M. K. Arjunan. The plot follows the life of a womaniser, Richard (Mohanlal), who along with his friends used to seduce, gang rape and kill girls. It was the last film of Kottarakkara Sreedharan Nair.

== Plot ==
It is the story of a womaniser, Richard, along with his friends, who seduce girls and finally kill them after gang rape. But destiny had different plans as the same womaniser really falls in love with a girl for the first time and he reaches the same tourist spot for their honeymoon. His same friends also partying there, find them.

== Cast ==
- Mohanlal as Richard
- Urvasi as Aswathi Varma
- Lizy as Sophia Richard
- Minu Mohan as Betty Elizabeth Francis
- Innocent as Phalgunan Pillai
- Thilakan as Dr. Hameed
- Nedumudi Venu as Ayilyam thirunal Kumara Varma Thamburan
- Ashokan
- Bahadoor as Kariachen
- Valsala Menon as Kuttimaluamma
- Kottarakkara Sreedharan Nair as Father
- Siddique
- Babu Antony as Thommi, Richard's friend

== Soundtrack ==
The music was composed by M. K. Arjunan and the lyrics were written by R. K. Damodaran. The song "Chandra Kiranathin Chandanamunnum" from the film was a classic hit of the era.

All lyrics are written by R. K. Damodaran; all music is composed by M. K. Arjunan.

No.	Title	Artist(s)	Length
1.	"Chandrakiranathin"	K. J. Yesudas
2.	"Ila Kozhinja Greeshmavum"	Choir, Lathika
3.	"Koode Vaa Koodu Thedi Vaa"	Unni Menon, Choir
