= Keli (film) =

- Poster
- Directed by: Bharathan
- Written by: John Paul
- Based on: Njan Sivapillai by T. V. Varkey
- Produced by: Ganga Movie Makers
- Starring: Jayaram; Innocent; Charmila; Murali; Nedumudi Venu
- Cinematography: Venu
- Edited by: N. P. Suresh
- Music by: Bharathan; Johnson (background score)
- Production company: Ganga Movie Makers
- Distributed by: Ganga Movie Makers
- Release date: May 30, 1991
- Country: India
- Language: Malayalam

Keli (transl. The Play) is a 1991 Malayalam romantic drama film written by John Paul and directed by Bharathan. Starring Jayaram, Innocent, Charmila, Murali and Nedumudi Venu in pivotal roles, the film had songs composed by Bharathan himself. Location of this film was in Shoranur.

== Cast ==
- Jayaram as Narayanankutty
- Innocent as Lazer Muthalali
- Charmila as Sridevi
- Nedumudi Venu as "Romance" Kumaran
- Murali as Appootty
- K. P. A. C. Lalitha as Seemanthini
- Sukumari as Muthassi
- Balan K. Nair as Ramankutty Nair
- Unnimary as Menon's wife
- Syama as Hema
- Adoor Bhawani as Paruvamma
- Aboobacker as Chettiyar
- Mala Aravindan as Commentator

== Plot ==
Narayanan Kutty, a handicapped man in a village, struggles to make a living despite the support of Lazar, a wealthy man who pretends to be a kind and helpful figure in front of the villagers and helps Narayanan start a small grocery shop. Narayanan falls in love with Sridevi, a school teacher who arrives in the village, and their marriage is soon arranged. However, their happiness is shattered when the body of another teacher, Hema, is found in the river. The police begin investigating her death, and Narayanan becomes the prime suspect after a police dog focuses on him, causing the villagers to doubt his innocence. His marriage to Sridevi is jeopardized, and even Lazar, who once helped him, refuses to assist him in clearing his name.

When the police catch Narayanan Kutty, he reveals that Aputi had taken a sack from his shop the night of the murder, which makes Narayanan believe that Aputi might be framing him out of hate and trying to make him the killer. Narayanan fears Aputi might harm him when he comes to confront him, but to his surprise, Aputi reveals the truth. Aputi explains that Lazar, in an attempt to protect his reputation after Hema became pregnant with his child, killed her. Aputi’s revelation clears up the misunderstanding. Narayanan, with Aputi’s help, confronts Lazar in front of the villagers, forcing him to confess to the crime. With Lazar's confession, Narayanan is exonerated, and his name is cleared. In the end, Narayanan Kutty and Sridevi join back, and they are happy together.

== Soundtrack ==
The music was composed by Bharathan and the lyrics were written by Kaithapram.

No.	Song	Singers	Lyrics	Length (m:ss)
1	"Olelam Paadi"	Lathika	Kaithapram	
2	"Thaaram Vaalkannaadi Nokki"	K. S. Chithra	Kaithapram	4:56

The song "Thaaram Valkkannadi Nokki" is composed in Bharathan's favourite Carnatic raga, Hindolam. The song won K. S. Chithra the best female singer in that year's Kerala State Film Awards.
