= Ice Cream (1986 film) =

- Directed by: Antony Eastman
- Written by: Antony Eastman; John Paul (dialogues)
- Screenplay by: John Paul
- Produced by: Hameed
- Starring: Mammootty; Lissy; Jayarekha; Innocent; Thilakan
- Cinematography: Vipin Mohan
- Edited by: G. Murali
- Music by: Johnson
- Production company: Simna Movies
- Distributed by: Simna Movies
- Release date: 29 August 1986
- Country: India
- Language: Malayalam

Ice Cream is a 1986 Indian Malayalam film, directed by Antony Eastman and produced by Hameed. The film stars Mammootty, Lissy, Jayarekha and Innocent in the lead roles. Musical score of the film is composed by Johnson.

== Cast ==
- Mammootty as Thampi
- Lissy as Rekha
- Jayarekha
- Innocent as Police Officer
- Thilakan as Omanakuttan Nair
- KPAC Lalitha as Elizabeth
- Ashokan as Prakashan
- Sankaradi as Doctor
- Bharath Gopi as Panikkar
- Karamana Janardanan Nair
- Mala Aravindan as Worker
- Philomina as Mother
- T. P. Madhavan as Bhaskaran

== Soundtrack ==
The music was composed by Johnson and the lyrics were written by Poovachal Khader.

No.	Song	Singers	Lyrics	Length (m:ss)
1	"Nedanai Puthiyoru Lokam"	K. S. Chithra, Lathika	Poovachal Khader	
2	"Premamennalenthu"	Sharreth, Cochin Ibrahim	Poovachal Khader	
3	"Thaarunyam Kinaavu Neyyunnu"	K. S. Chithra, Lathika	Poovachal Khader	
