= Adhyayam Onnu Muthal =

1985 Indian film

- Theatrical release poster
- Directed by: Sathyan Anthikad
- Screenplay by: John Paul
- Story by: M. D. Ratnamma
- Based on: Aadimadhyanthangal by M. D. Rathnamma
- Produced by: A. Raghunath
- Starring: Mohanlal; Madhavi; M. G. Soman; Balan K. Nair; Kaviyoor Ponnamma
- Cinematography: Anandakuttan
- Edited by: K. Rajagopal
- Music by: Jerry Amaldev (songs); Kannur Rajan (score)
- Production company: Harshanjali
- Distributed by: Central Pictures
- Release date: 27 September 1985
- Country: India
- Language: Malayalam

Adhyayam Onnu Muthal (transl. From chapter one) is a 1985 Indian Malayalam-language drama film directed by Sathyan Anthikad and written by John Paul, adapted from the novel Aadimadhyanthangal by M. D. Rathnamma. The film stars Mohanlal, Madhavi, M. G. Soman, Balan K. Nair, Kaviyoor Ponnamma, Venu Nagavalli, and Bahadoor.

== Plot ==
Seetha is from an aristocratic family and finds out that her aunt, father's sister is back in the village with her only son Vishnu. Seetha visits her aunt frequently without her family's knowledge as her family had severed ties with the aunt for marrying a Christian. Vishnu also reprimands Seetha for visiting his home frequently as he has only anger towards his mother's family. Seetha however develops feelings for her cousin Vishnu. However Vishnu does not reciprocate this feeling towards her.

One day, Seetha her family finds out about this and Seetha's father Kesava Kuruppu forbids her to prolong this affair as he wants his daughter not to marry a man from a lower caste. Seetha is married off hastily to a bank employee Rameshan Nair against her wishes. Rameshan and his mother loves Seetha, but Seetha was lost in her world. Rameshan, the understanding husband gives Seetha enough time to cope, but loses hope one day and proposes to separate. Seetha realises her mistake and decides to start her life afresh.

Rameshan leaves to office for the first time after wedding promising to come home early and take her outside. Seetha, all dressed up waits for her husband but a tragedy awaited her. Rameshan dies in a road mishap. Kuruppu, the determined man he is brings Seetha home against her wishes. He arranges her next marriage with Narayanan, a widower, who already has two children from his first marriage. Seetha herself lost in her sadness agrees and marries Narayanan. She makes herself happy by spending time with Narayanan's children.

After a few days, her husband, who was a heart patient, dies. She has to leave that house after being harassed by Narayanan's annoying sister. She manages to find shelter in a maid servant's house. Her father realises this and his heart is broken. His close friend points out Kurup's mistake of not letting Seetha choose the man of her dreams in the name of family's honour. Kurup realises his mistake, goes to his sister's home and apologizes. Vishnu who is already heart broken seeing Seetha's fate tells his uncle that its never too late to rectify mistakes. In the climax, Vishnu goes to meet Seetha and admits his love for her.

== Cast ==
- Mohanlal as Vishnu, Seetha's cousin
- Madhavi as Seetha
- Venu Nagavalli as Rameshan Nair, Seetha's first husband
- Soman as Narayanan, Seetha's second husband
- Balan K. Nair as Kesava Kurup, Seetha's father
- Kaviyoor Ponnamma as Lakshmi, Vishnu's mother
- Kundara Johnny as Sreedharankutty, Seetha's Brother
- Remyasree as Saraswathy, Sreedharankutty's wife
- Bahadur as Maash
- Rohini as Rema
- Sukumari as Karthyayaniyamma, Rameshan's Mother
- Shubha as Narayanan's Sister
- Adoor Bhavani as Naniyamma, the maid servant
- Master Prasobh as Ravi (Sreekuttan), Narayanan's son
- Baby Chaithanya

== Production ==
The film is an adaptation of the novel Aadimadhyanthangal by M. D. Rathnamma. The screenplay was written by John Paul. As part of remodeling the story for a cinematic adaptation, some of the characters were removed in the film.

== Soundtrack ==
The music was composed by Jerry Amaldev and the lyrics were written by M. D. Rajendran.

No.	Song	Singers	Lyrics	Length (m:ss)
1	"Akkuthikkuthaana"	Sunanda (Singer) & Chorus	M. D. Rajendran	
2	"Illillam Kaavil"	Unni Menon	M. D. Rajendran	
