= Sujatha (1980 film) =

- Theatrical release poster
- Directed by: Mohan
- Written by: A. L. Narayanan (dialogues)
- Story by: Padmarajan
- Produced by: K. Balaji
- Starring: Vijayan; Shankar; Saritha; Sukumari; Rajalakshmi; Vanitha Krishnachandran; Major Sundarrajan; Raveendran
- Music by: M. S. Viswanathan
- Production company: Sujatha Cine Arts
- Distributed by: M. S. Release
- Release date: 26 September 1980
- Country: India
- Language: Tamil

Sujatha is a 1980 Indian Tamil-language film directed by Mohan, starring Vijayan, Shankar, Saritha, Sukumari, Rajalakshmi, Vanitha Krishnachandran, Major Sundarrajan and Raveendran. It is a remake of the Malayalam film Shalini Ente Koottukari. The film was released on 26 September 1980.

== Plot ==
Sujatha is the story of a brother and sister, played by Shankar and Saritha respectively. Shankar commits suicide to stop the forced marriage initiated by their father Major Sundarrajan, as she does not want to marry. The film shows light in Saritha's life, when she meets a new college lecturer Vijayan.

== Cast ==
- Vijayan
- Shankar
- Saritha
- Major Sundarrajan
- Sukumari
- Sachu
- Thengai Srinivasan
- Nagesh
- Manorama
- Rajalakshmi
- Vanitha Krishnachandran
- Raveendran

== Soundtrack ==
Soundtrack was composed by M. S. Viswanathan.

Track listing
No.	Title	Singer(s)	Length
1.	"Nee Varuvaiyena" (Female)	Kalyani Menon
2.	"Nee Varuvaiyena" (Male)	P. Jayachandran
3.	"Nadai Alangaram"	S. P. Balasubrahmanyam
4.	"Engirintho Vantha Paravaigale"	P. Susheela
5.	"Antharanga"	P. Jayachandran

== Critical reception ==
Anna praised acting, cinematography, music, direction, humour but felt overt emotions in second half could have been trimmed.
