= Mukham =

- Directed by: Mohan
- Screenplay by: Mani Swamy; Joseph Madapally (Dialogues)
- Story by: Mohan; Ananthu
- Produced by: Anupama Mohan
- Starring: Mohanlal; Nassar; Ranjini
- Cinematography: Saroj Padi
- Edited by: Ravi Kiran
- Music by: Johnson
- Production company: Appu Cine Art
- Distributed by: Bhavachithra
- Release date: 1990
- Running time: 118 min
- Country: India
- Language: Malayalam

Mukham (transl. Face) is a 1990 Indian Malayalam-language thriller film co-written and directed by Mohan, starring Mohanlal, Nassar and Ranjini in the lead roles. The film does not have any songs, but features a musical score composed by Johnson.

== Plot ==
Police officer Hariprasad is assigned to investigate a series of murders committed by a mysterious sniper. The killer has already shot and killed three people from hidden locations, making him difficult for the police to trace. The case suddenly becomes personal when Hariprasad receives a letter from the killer. The letter says that the fourth victim will be Hariprasad's wife, Usha, because the killer believes that she has been unfaithful to her husband. Hariprasad must now continue the investigation while trying to protect Usha. As he studies the crime scenes and the pattern behind the killings, he discovers that the sniper carefully watches his victims and chooses people whom he believes are living immoral or dishonest lives. The investigation is made harder by problems within the police force and by the killer's ability to remain hidden. Hariprasad also realizes that the murderer knows private details about his family, showing that he has been watching them closely.

The killer is eventually revealed to be Alexander, a man who believes he has the right to punish people whose behavior he considers immoral. Rather than choosing his victims at random, Alexander sees himself as a judge and executioner and plans each sniper attack in advance. His belief that Usha has betrayed Hariprasad leads him to select her as his fourth target. Knowing that another attack is coming, Hariprasad studies Alexander's behavior and tries to predict where and how he will strike. The pursuit develops into a psychological struggle as Hariprasad uses Alexander's confidence and sense of superiority against him. He finally draws Alexander into a situation where the sniper can no longer remain safely hidden. In the final confrontation, Hariprasad prevents the planned attack on Usha, overpowers and disarms Alexander, and brings the series of killings to an end.

== Cast ==
- Mohanlal as ACP Hariprasad IPS
- Ranjini as Usha
- Nassar as Comm. P. N. Narendran IPS
- Priya as Prema
- Bindhya as Nirmala
- Sukumaran as DySP Minnal Madhavan
- Sankaradi as Kesavan Nair
- Vijay Menon as Vijay
- Soman as Home Minister Sukumaran Warrier
- Innocent as Anthony
- Mala Aravindan as Agasthy
- Ravi Menon as Kunjikrishnan
- Valsala Menon as Usha's Mother
- Shivaji as CI Narayana Swamy
- T. P. Madhavan as Uthaman, Usha's Father
- Kundara Johnny as Menon
- Anderson as Alexander
- Rajan Sankaradi as George
- Joseph Madapally in Cameo Appearance
- Rajeevnath in Cameo Appearance
- Ramyasree in Cameo Appearance
