= Innocent (actor) =

Indian actor and politician (1948–2023)

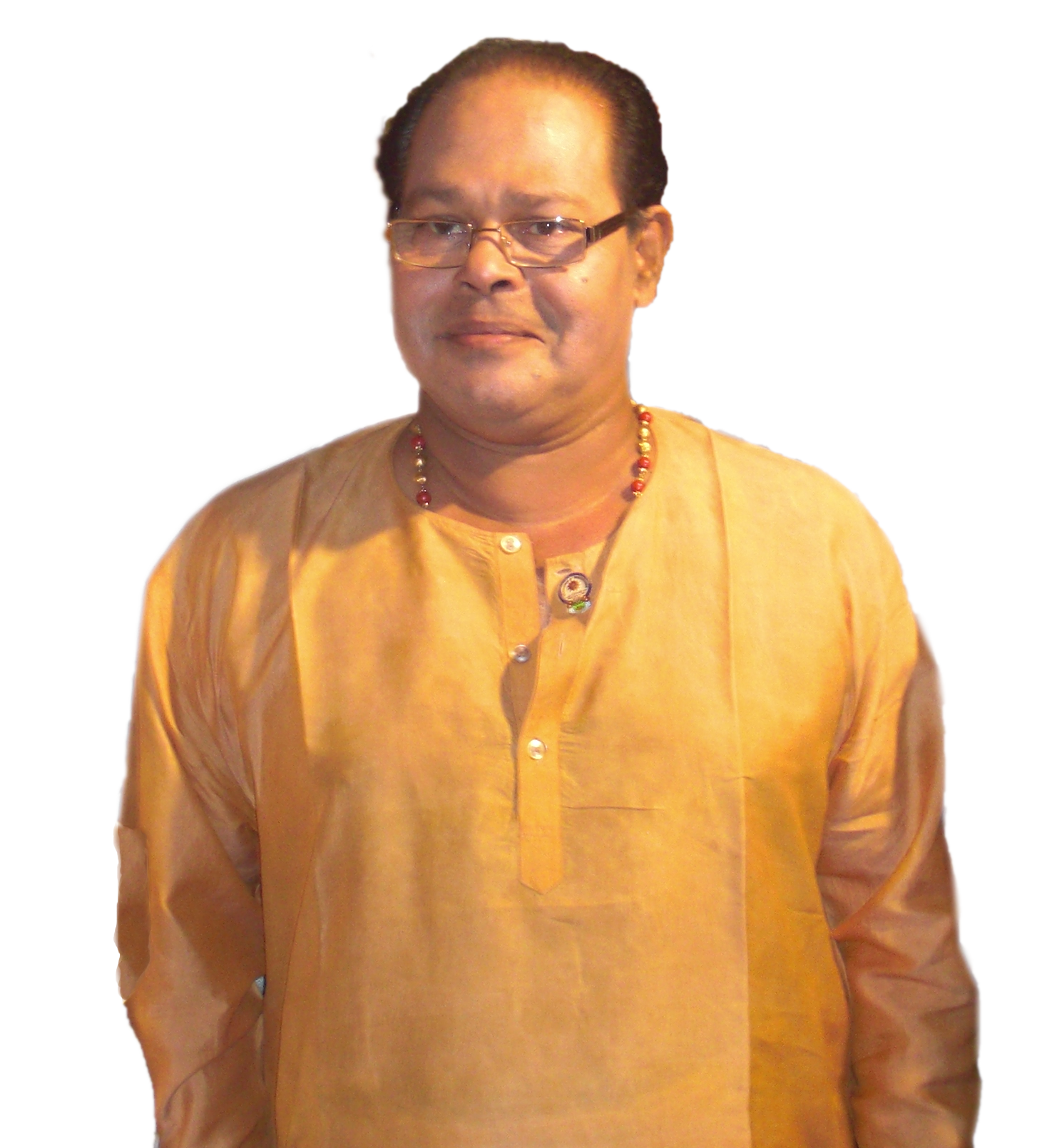
- Innocent in 2011

President of AMMA
- In office 2000-2018
- Preceded by: Madhu
- Succeeded by: Mohanlal

Member of Parliament, Lok Sabha
- In office 5 June 2014 – 23 May 2019
- Preceded by: K. P. Dhanapalan
- Succeeded by: Benny Behanan
- Constituency: Chalakudy

Municipal councillor of Irinjalakuda
- In office 1979 – 1982

Personal details
- Born: Innocent Vareed Thekkethala; 28 February 1948 Irinjalakuda, Kingdom of Cochin, Dominion of India
- Died: 26 March 2023 (aged 75) Kochi, Kerala, India
- Party: Independent
- Spouse: Alice (m. 1976)
- Children: 1
- Occupation: Actor; writer; politician; producer; singer
- Years active: 1972–2023

Innocent Vareed Thekkethala (28 February 1948 – 26 March 2023), known mononymously as Innocent, was an Indian actor, film producer, writer and politician, who in a career spanning almost five decades has appeared in over 700 films predominantly in Malayalam cinema in addition to a few Tamil, Kannada, Hindi and English films, mostly in comedic roles. Widely regarded as one of the greatest comedians in the history of Malayalam cinema, he is also known for his negative and highly nuanced character roles. He is also the recipient of several awards, including three Kerala State Film Awards, a Kerala Film Critics Award, a Filmfare Awards South and seven Asianet Film Awards. He also won the prestigious Kerala Sahitya Akademi Award for Humour in 2020, for his book Irinjalakudakku Chuttum. He is noted for his wit and impressive dialogue delivery in the typical Thrissur slang.

He served as a Member of Parliament in the 16th Lok Sabha (2014–2019) of India representing Chalakudy constituency. In 1979, he was elected as the municipal councilor of Irinjalakuda municipality. Innocent won the 2014 Lok Sabha elections from Chalakudy Lok Sabha constituency as an independent candidate supported by the Left Democratic Front (LDF). Innocent served as the president of the Association of Malayalam Movie Artists (AMMA), a guild of Malayalam artists from 2003 to 2018.

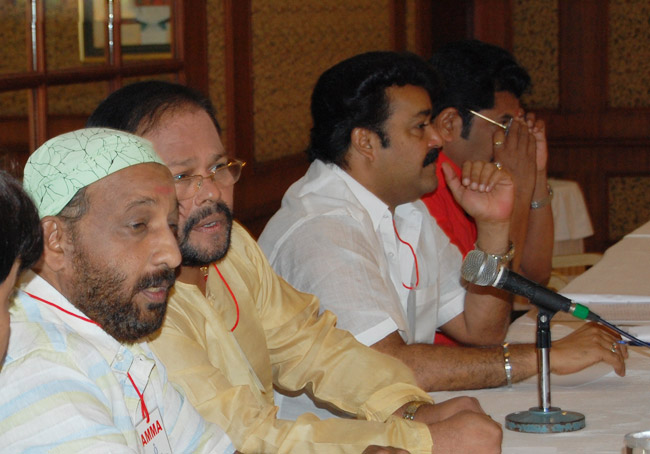
From the main stage of General body meeting of the Association of Malayalam Movie Artists - from left Nedumudi Venu, Innocent, Mohanlal and Mukesh

In 2012, Innocent was diagnosed with non-Hodgkin lymphoma. After overcoming the first stage of cancer, he returned to the silver screen in 2013 with films like Geethanjali. Cancer Wardile Chiri (Laughter in the Cancer Ward) is a memoir written by Innocent while he was undergoing cancer treatment. Innocent wrote seven books based on his experiences at different phases of life with a humorous undertone. He also contributed to columns in numerous magazines and newspapers. In 2020, Innocent won the Kerala Sahitya Akademi Award for Humour for his book Irinjalakudaku Chuttum.

== Early life ==
Innocent was born at Irinjalakuda in the Thrissur district of Kerala to Margaret and Vareed of the Thekkethala house. He was the fifth child and third son of his parents, who had eight children. He had his primary education at Little Flower Convent School, Irinjalakuda; Don Bosco Higher Secondary School, Irinjalakuda; and Sree Sangameswara NSS School, Irinjalakuda. He studied till eighth grade and discontinued his studies as he could not cope with studying. Innocent went to Madras (then) for his acting career and worked there as a production executive.

During the emergency years, Innocent made his way to Davanagere and joined his cousins George (studying medicine at JJM Medical College), Davis, and his brother Sunny who were managing the Shamannur Match factory. Later, he became the proprietor of the factory.

As Innocent was keen on the performance activities, he seized the opportunity to participate in Davangere, Kerala Samajam drama, and received audience approval in entertainment events.

Innocent left Davangere in 1974. He tried his hand at multiple businesses and jobs to eke out a living. From being a stationary owner to a wholesale sandal distributor to setting up a leather business to a cycle renting business to a cement supplier and also that of a coach cum manager of a volleyball team, a game he knew nothing about.

Growing up, he had a few conflicts with his father, Vareed, because his brothers continued to have an excellent education and became successful doctors, lawyers, and judges. After some time, he entered politics and became Municipal councilor of Irinjalakuda.

== Film career ==
Innocent entered the film industry in 1972 with the movie Nritashala. At first, he produced a few serious offbeat films, but he was not successful. In the long span of his career, Innocent has worked in more than 700 films, mostly in comedy roles, predominantly in Malayalam. He has also acted in a few Tamil and Hindi films.

Innocent's mannerisms and diction is unique in Malayalam cinema and he wildly caught the attention of the Malayalam audience. This made him one of the best in the Malayalam comedy scene, also making him a hot favorite for mimicry artistes. His popularity can be gauged from the fact that many frontline directors in Malayalam (like Priyadarshan, Satyan Anthikkad, Fazil and Kamal) rarely made films without Innocent. He has proven his acting skills in serious and character roles in several films. He has been the president of the Association of Malayalam Movie Artistes (AMMA) for 12 years. He held the post for four consecutive terms.

Innocent has played many comedy roles in movies like Ramji Rao Speaking, Mannar Mathai Speaking, Kilukkam, Godfather, Vietnam Colony, Nadodikattu, Manichitrathazhu, Kalyanaraman, Chronic Bachelor etc. Innocent has also played several character and villain roles in movies such as Keli, Kathodu Kathoram.

He predominantly worked in Malayalam films in addition to a few Tamil, Kannada, Hindi and English films, mostly in comedic roles. In a career spanning more than five decades, he acted in more than 700 films and is considered one of the best comedians in Malayalam cinema. He also appeared in roles with negative shades such as in Mazhavilkavadi, Ponmuttayidunna Tharavu and Ganamela. Innocent won several awards, including Kerala State Film Award and Kerala Film Critics Award.

Other films include Kabooliwaala, Gajakesariyogam, Mithunam, Mazhavilkavadi, Manassinakkare, Thuruppugulan, Rasathanthram,Naran and Mahasamudram. His pairing with K. P. A. C. Lalitha was highly successful. They have acted together in many movies such as Ponn Muttayidunna Tharavu, My Dear Muthachchan, Godfather and Manichitrathazhu. Philip's was his last film before his death in March 2023.

== Books ==
Innocent has authored seven books: Njan Innocent, Cancer Wardile Chiri, Irinjalakudakku Chuttum (memoirs), Mazha Kannadi (collection of short stories), Chirrikku Pinnil (autobiography) and Kalante Delhi Yathra Anthikkad Vazhi are some of them. Cancer Wardile Chiri (Laughter in the Cancer Ward) is an account of his experiences while undergoing treatment for throat cancer. Irinjalakudakku Chuttum won the Kerala Sahitya Akademi Award for Humour in 2020.

== Politics ==
Innocent was the Irinjalakkuda Mandalam Secretary of the Revolutionary Socialist Party during the 1970s. He had contested the Irinjalakkuda municipal council elections as Revolutionary Socialist Party-backed candidate in 1979 and had won that election. He was rumoured to be a Left Democratic Front (LDF)-supported independent candidate from the Irinjalakkuda assembly constituency in the 2006 Kerala Legislative Assembly elections but this did not happen. Innocent won the 2014 Lok Sabha elections from Chalakudy Lok Sabha constituency in Thrissur district as an independent candidate supported by the LDF.

Innocent lost in the Lok Sabha elections 2019 to UDF candidate Benny Behanan.

== Personal life ==
Innocent was married to Alice in 1976, and the couple has a son named Sonnet. Innocent Jr. and Anna are his grandchildren. Childhood Innocent was played by Innocent Jr. in a documentary.

== Illness and death ==
On 3 March 2023, Innocent was suddenly hospitalised after feeling ill. He was placed under extracorporeal membrane oxygenation (ECMO) support after his condition turned for the worse. A cancer survivor, Innocent was in the hospital for nearly three weeks. He died at VPS Lakeshore Hospital in Kochi, Kerala, on 26 March 2023, at the age of 75 of complications from COVID-19 as confirmed by Dr. V. P. Gangadharan who was treating him.

== Awards ==
Kerala State Film Awards

- 1989 – Second Best Actor – Mazhavil Kavadi, Jaathakam
- 1981 – Second Best Film (Producer) – Vida Parayum Munpe
- 1982 – Second Best Film (Producer) – Ormakkayi

Kerala State Film Critics Award

- 2009 – Best Actor – Patham Nilayile Theevandi

Asianet Film Award

- 2001 – Supporting Actor Award – Ravanaprabhu
- 2004 – Supporting Actor Award – Vesham
- 2006 – Best Actor in a Comic Role – Rasathanthram, Yes Your Honour
- 2008 – Supporting Actor Award – Innathe Chintha Vishayam
- 2010 - Character Actor Award -Kadha Thudarunnu
- 2011 - Character Actor Award -Snehaveedu, Swapna Sanchari
- 2013 – Lifetime Achievement Award

Other awards

- 2004 – Filmfare Award for Best Supporting Actor – Malayalam for Manassinakkare
- 2007 – Sathyan Award
- 2008 – Annual Malayalam Movie Award (Dubai) for Outstanding Performance
- 2013 – TTK Prestige-Vanitha Film Awards – Lifetime Achievement Award
- 2019 – He is Distributing Awards Realtors Investors Summit

== Filmography ==
=== As actor ===
Key
†	Denotes films that have not yet been released

==== Malayalam films ====
===== 1970s =====
Year	Title	Role	Notes
1972	Nrithasala	News Reporter	
1973	Football Champion	Football Player	
1973	Urvashi Bharathi		
1973	Jesus	Courtier in King Herod's court	
1974	Nellu		
1978	Randu Penkuttikal		
1979	Vadaka Veedu		

===== 1980s =====
Year	Title	Role	Notes
1980	Kochu Kochu Thettukal		
1980	Sooryadaham		
1981	Vida Parayum Munpe	Varghese	
1982	Idavela	Madhavankutty	
1982	Ormakkayi	Rappayi	
1982	Ilakkangal	Devassikutty	
1982	Niram Maarunna Nimishangal		
1983	Lekhayude Maranam Oru Flashback		
1983	Prem Nazirine Kanmanilla	Film Producer	
1983	Mouna Raagam	Freddy/Valyappan	
1983	Changatham	Priest	Cameo
1983	Prathijnja		
1984	Panchavadi Palam	Barabas	
1984	Paavam Poornima	Unnithan	
1984	Koottinilamkili	Office Staff	
1984	Ente Nandinikkuttikku		
1985	Dheivatheyorthu		
1985	Scene No. 7	Bhaskara Menon	
1985	Archana Aaradhana	Kurupu	
1985	Punnaram Cholli Cholli	Peethambharan	
1985	Irakal	Aniyan Pillai	
1985	Ambada Njaane!	Kumaran	
1985	Avidathe Pole Ivideyum		
1985	Puli Varunne Puli	Saami	
1985	Aram + Aram = Kinnaram	Driver	
1985	Vasantha Sena	Thirumeni	
1985	Akkare Ninnoru Maran	Shankaran	
1985	Oru Nokku Kanan	Innochen	
1985	Ayanam	Chakkunni	
1985	Ee Lokam Evide Kure Manushyar	Ouseppu	
1985	Kathodu Kathoram	Kapyar	
1985	Kandu Kandarinju	Thomas	
1985	Katha Ithuvare	Driver	
1985	Ee Thanalil Ithiri Neram		
1985	Akalathe Ambili		
1985	Theerathinariyumo Thirayude Vedana		
1985	Onnaamprathi Olivil		
1985	Ivide Ee Theerathu		
1985	Iniyum Kadha Thudarum		
1986	Yuvajanotsavam	Kunjunni Nair	
1986	Chilambu	Enashu	
1986	Gandhinagar 2nd Street	Policeman	
1986	Oru Yugasandhya	Sreedharan Nair	
1986	Vivahitare Itihile	Kuriachan	
1986	Ilanjippookkal	Kaduvappara Pappu	
1986	Mizhineerppoovukal	Phalgunan Pillai	
1986	Meenamaasathile Sooryan	Adhikari	
1986	Doore Doore Oru Koodu Koottam	MLA	
1986	Naale Njangalude Vivaaham	Pandit Keralaraja Gangadara Munshi	
1986	Ithile Iniyum Varu	Dasappan	
1986	Aavanazhi	Vishnu	
1986	Oru Kadha Oru Nunakkadha		
1986	Katturumbinum Kathu Kuthu		
1986	Prathyekam Sradhikkukka	Pothachan	
1986	Koodanayum Kattu	Charlie	
1986	Chidambaram	Himself	
1986	Pappan Priyappetta Pappan	Constable Kuttan	
1986	Amme Bhagavathi	Brahmin	
1986	Geetham		
1986	Sunil Vayassu 20	Anthony	
1986	Love Story		
1986	Sanmanassullavarkku Samadhanam	Kunji Kannan Nair	
1986	Ice Cream	Police Inspector	
1986	Revathikkoru Pavakkutty	Bhasi Pillai	
1986	Atham Chithira Chothy	Mathan	
1986	Ente Entethu Mathrem	Vakkachan	
1986	Oridathu	Dr Rajasekharan	
1986	Ente Sonia		
1986	Dheem Tharikida Thom	Kurian	
1986	Ayalvasi Oru Daridravasi	Kuttan Pillai	
1986	Rareeram	Lonappan	
1986	Nyayavidhi	Channar	
1986	Ee Kaikalil	Ittoopp	
1986	Ponnum Kudathinum Pottu	Chandu Panikker	
1987	Neela Kurinji Poothappol	Kuttan Nair	
1987	Swathi Thirunal	Krishna Ravu	
1987	Itha Samayamayi	LIC Pathrose	
1987	Yagagni	Madhavan	
1987	Kottum Kuravayum		
1987	Oridathu		
1987	Maanasa Maine Varu		
1987	Ponnu		
1987	Aattakkadha		
1987	Aankiliyude Thaarattu	Thavala Mathayi	
1987	Varshangal Poyathariyaathe		
1987	Veendum Lisa		
1987	Archanappookkal		
1987	Ellaavarkkum Nanmakal		
1987	Unnikale Oru Kadha Parayam	Ouseppachan	
1987	Ivide Ellavarkum Sukham	Cheriyachen	
1987	Theertham		
1987	Sarvakalashala	Innachan	
1987	Oru Minnaminunginte Nurungu Vettam	Parameswaran Nair	
1987	Nadodikkattu	Balagopalan	
1987	Jaalakam	Gopi Kurup	
1987	Sreedharante Onnam Thirumurivu	Sadasivan	
1987	Thaniyavarthanam	Headmaster	
1988	Ayitham	Joseph	
1988	Oru Muthassi Katha	Thampuran	
1988	Charavalayam	Kumaran	
1988	Puravrutham	Kelu Nair	
1988	Aavanikunnile Kinnaripookkal	Kesavan	
1988	Aparan		
1988	Orkaappurathu		
1988	Adholokam		
1988	Paadamudra		
1988	Oozham		
1988	Sanghunadam	Dr Issac John	
1988	Oru Vivaada Vishayam		
1988	Samvalsarangal		
1988	Unnikrishnante Adyathe Christmas	Georgekutty	
1988	Aryan	Govindan Nair	
1988	Witness	Sankunni Nair	
1988	Vellanakalude Nadu	Ashokan	
1988	Simon Peter Ninakku Vendi	Vaniyambadi Chandran	
1988	Dhanushkodi		
1988	Sangham		
1988	Chithram	Money Render	
1988	Ponn Muttyidunna Tharavu	P.V. Panikkar	
1988	Pattana Pravesham	Puthanpurackal Balan	
1988	Mukunthetta Sumitra Vilikkunnu	Ramendra	
1988	Moonnam Mura	Kisan Jacob	
1988	Dhwani	Rappayi	
1988	August 1	Babu	
1989	Varnam	Bhaskaran Pillai	
1989	Varavelpu	Chathutty	
1989	Antharjanam	Vathapally Varkey	
1989	Varnatheru		
1989	Illikkaadum Chellakkaattum		
1989	Nerunnu Nanmakal		
1989	Vadakkunokkiyantram	Thalakulam Sir	
1989	Ramji Rao Speaking	Mannar Mathai	
1989	Pradeshika Varthakal	Kunjhambu Nair	
1989	Peruvannapurathe Visheshangal	Adiyodi	
1989	The News	Bhargavan Pillai	
1989	Mazhavil Kavadi	Shankarankutty Menon	
1989	Utharam	Nanu	
1989	Annakutty Kodambakkam Vilikkunnu	Kariyachan	
1989	Pooram	Shankaran	
1989	New Year	Pappan	
1989	Prayapoorthi Aayavarkku Mathram		
1989	Prabhatham Chuvanna Theruvil		
1989	Aattinakkare		
1989	Ammavanu Pattiya Amali	Ravunni	
1989	Rugmini		
1989	Miss Pamela		
1989	Naaga Panchami		
1989	Ashokante Aswathikuttikku		
1989	Kaalal Pada	Govindan Nair	
1989	Jathakam	Kunjuraman	
1989	Innale	Shankara Pillai	
1989	Chakkikotha Chankaran	Bhagavathar	
1989	Swagatham	Labrador bhai	

===== 1990s =====
Year	Title	Role	Notes
1990	Thoovalsparsham	Shishubalan	
1990	Thalayanamanthram	Daniel	
1990	Superstar	Devasyya	
1990	Vacation		
1990	Rosa I Love You		
1990	Paadatha Veenayum Paadum		
1990	Enquiry		
1990	Panthayakuthira		
1990	Radha Madhavam	E. Chandhu Nair	
1990	Ponnaranjanam	Thirumeni/Savathri's father	
1990	Shubhayathra	Ramettan	
1990	Sasneham	Eanasu	
1990	Saandhram	Paulo	
1990	Rajavazhcha	Ittoopp	
1990	Gajakesariyogam	Ayyappan Nair	
1990	Nagarangalil Chennu Raparkam	Ananthan	
1990	Mukham	Anthony	
1990	Malayogam	Rama Kurup	
1990	Pavakkooth	Chakkochen	
1990	Kouthuka Varthakal	Suryanarayana Iyer	
1990	Dr. Pasupathy	Dr. Pasupathi/Bhairavan	
1990	Cheriya Lokavum Valiya Manushyarum	Rocky	
1990	No.20 Madras Mail	Narayanan Nadar[TTE]	
1990	Kottayam Kunjachan	Mikhael	
1990	Kalikkalam	Velayil Chandy	
1990	Anantha Vruthantham	Padmanabhan	
1990	Champion Thomas	Dr. Unnithan	
1990	Paavam Paavam Rajakumaran	K. K. Menon	
1990	Malootty	Sankaran	
1990	Brahmarakshas	Potti	
1990	Kattu Kuthira	Balakrishna Menon	
1990	Purappad	Lonappan	
1991	Kizhakkunarum Pakshi	Girijavallabha Panikkar	
1991	Ulladakkam	Kunjachan	
1991	Sandesam	Yaswanth Sahai	
1991	Pookkalam Varavayi	Pothuval	
1991	Aavanikunnile Kinnaripookkal	Keshava Pilla	
1991	Ottayal Pattalam	DIG Chandrashekara Menon	
1991	Oru Tharam Randu Tharam Moonu Tharam	Adithya Pilla	
1991	Post Box No. 27	M.D Somashekaran	
1991	Mimics Parade	Fr. Tharakkandam	
1991	Oru Vaakku Oreyoru Vaakku	Kesava Pillai	
1991	Maydinam	Ouseph	
1991	Kunjikuruvi ( Ammayude Swantham Kunju Mary )		
1991	Khandakaavyam		
1991	Sundari Kakka		
1991	Eagle	Appukuttan/Murugadas	
1991	Kuttapathram		
1991	Kilukkampetti	Scariah	
1991	Kilukkam	Kittunni	
1991	Keli	Lazer	
1991	Kadinjool Kalyanam	Panikkar	
1991	Godfather	Swaminathan	
1991	Ganamela	Sreedhara Panikkar	
1991	Apoorvam Chilar	Idanilam Pathrose	
1991	Amina Tailors	Lonappan Mashu	
1991	Aakasha Kottayile Sultan	Dr. Chenthrappinni	
1991	Kanalkkattu		
1991	Agni Nilavu	Sakuni	
1991	Anaswaram	Immanuel Joseph	
1991	Irikku M.D. Akathundu	Samuel	
1991	Bhoomika	Sivan Pillai	
1991	Kalari	Koshi	
1991	Adayalam	Police Officer	
1991	Nagarathil Samsara Vishayam	Gap Swamy	
1991	Ennum Nanmakal	Vishwanathan (Thotta MLA)	
1991	Ezhunnallathu		
1992	Apaaratha	SI Lonappan	
1992	Ponnurukkum Pakshi	Bhaskaran	
1992	Utsava Melam	Kamalasanana Kuruppu	
1992	Snehasagaram	Ramayyan	
1992	Ente Ponnu Thampuran	Varkey	
1992	Kasargode Khaderbhai	Fr. Tharakandam	
1992	Nakshthrakoodaram	Fr. Bhavanious	
1992	Vasudha		
1992	Pramanikal		
1992	My Dear Muthachan	K. P. Adiyodi	
1992	Makkal Mahathmayam	Kuruppu Maash	
1992	Ennodishtam Koodamo	Family Doctor	
1992	Aayushkalam	Gopala Menon	
1992	Kizhakkan Pathrose	Pothen Upadeshi	
1992	Adwaitham	Seshadri Iyer	
1992	Vietnam Colony	K. K. Joseph	
1992	Kallanum Polisum	Prabha's father	
1992	Mr & Mrs		
1992	Kingini	Govindan	
1992	Kaazhchakkappuram		
1992	Kallan Kappalil Thanne		
1993	Addeham Enna Iddeham	CI Balachandran Nair	
1993	Venkalam	Kandappan	
1993	Sakshal Sreeman Chathunni	Chathunni	
1993	Midhunam	Kurup	
1993	Manichithrathazhu	Unnithan	
1993	Kabuliwala	Kannas	
1993	Injakkadan Mathai & Sons	Inchakkadan Mathai	
1993	Devaasuram	Warrier	
1993	Aagneyam	Pappachan	
1993	Bandhukkal Sathrukkal	Ananda Kuruppu	
1993	Oru Kadankatha Pole	Pillai, Marriage Brockar	
1993	Aalavattam	Vareeth	
1993	Porutham		
1994	Pingami	Iyengar	
1994	Pavithram	Erissery	
1994	Chanakya Soothrangal	Kuttan Pilla	
1994	Pavam I.A. Ivachan	Ivaan	
1994	Rajadhani	SI Damodaran K. D.	
1994	Pakshe	Inashu	
1994	Santhanagopalam	Adiyodi	
1994	Bheesmacharya	Raghavan	
1994	Sukham Sukhakaram		
1994	Njan Kodiswaran	Appunni	
1995	Puthukottyile Puthu Manavalan	Pillai	
1995	Thirumanassu	Kunjan Pillai Raman Nair	
1995	Pai Brothers	Ganapathi Pai	
1995	Mannar Mathai Speaking	Mannar Mathai	
1995	Mangalam Veettil Manaseswari Gupta	Narayanankutty	
1995	Kusruthikaatu	Indira's Father	
1995	Sakshyam	Chittappan	
1995	Keerthanam	Mathewkutty Aashan	
1995	No: 1 Snehatheeram Banglore North	Kuriakose	
1996	Thooval Kottaram	Radhakrishnan	
1996	Surya Puthrikal		
1996	Lalanam	Dr Sreekumaran Unnithan	
1996	Kudumbakodathi	N. D. Raman Nair	
1996	Kireedamillatha Rajakkanmar	Bharathan	
1996	Excuse Me Ethu Collegila		
1996	Kalliveedu	Chittedathu Madhavan Nair	
1996	Nandagopaalante Kusruthikal		
1996	Harbour	Father Sebastian	
1996	Hitler	Madhavan Kutty's father	
1996	King Soloman		
1996	Kinnam Katta Kallan		
1996	Azhakiya Ravanan	Karayogam President T.P.V Kuruppu	
1997	Superman	Kochunni	
1997	Aniyathi Pravu	Chellappan	
1997	Mannadiar Penninu Chenkotta Checkan	Gajendra Mannadiar	
1997	Fashion Parade		
1997	Ishtadanam	Advocate Dharmapalalan Thambi	
1997	Rajathanthram	Madhavan Nair	
1997	Arjunan Pillayum Anchu Makkalum	Arjunan Pilla	
1997	Kalyana Unnikal	Anthrayose	
1997	Chandralekha	Iravi	
1997	Aaram Thamburan	S.I. Bharathan	Guest Appearance
1998	Vismayam	Narayanan	
1998	Harikrishnans	Sundaran	
1998	Chinthavishtayaya Shyamala	Achuthan Nair	
1998	Ayal Kadha Ezhuthukayanu	Maamachan	
1998	Meenakashi Kalyanam		
1998	Ayushman Bhava	Govinda Menon	
1998	Amma Ammaayiyamma	Bhargavan	
1998	Kusruthi Kuruppu	Vareed Thekkethala	
1998	Kudumba Vaarthakal	Ambu Nair/Devadas	
1998	Sreekrishnapurathu Nakshathrathilakkam	Nanda Kumar	
1998	Manthrikumaran	Adv. Bahuleyan	
1998	Sooryaputhran	Paulose	
1999	Ustaad	Kunji Palu	
1999	Udayapuram Sulthan	Govindan Nair	
1999	Aakasha Ganga	Rama Varma Thampuran	
1999	Angene Oru Avadhikkalathu	Kaimal	
1999	Independence	Mythreyan	
1999	Chandranudikkunna Dikhil	Anthony	

===== 2000s =====
Year	Title	Role	Notes
2000	Valliettan	Ramankutty Kaimal	
2000	Mr. Butler	Captain K.G.Nair	
2000	Life Is Beautiful	Nambiar	
2000	Sahayathrikakku Snehapoorvam	Janardhanan / Julius Caesar	
2000	Kochu Kochu Santhoshangal	Jose	
2000	Snehapoorvam Anna	Anna's Father	
2000	Swayamvara Panthal	Shankarbhanu	
2001	Nakshathragal Parayathirunnathu	Govinda Kamath	
2001	Kakkakuyil	Pothuval	
2001	Narendran Makan Jayakanthan Vaka	Johnny Vellikala	
2001	Uthaman	Chacko Cherian	
2001	Ravanaprabhu	Warrier	
2001	Ishtam	Narayanan	
2002	Snehithan	Devassya / Devarunyam Devanamboodiripad	
2002	Savithriyute Aranjanam	Ravunni	
2002	www.anukudumbam.com		
2002	Phantom	The Priest	
2002	Jagathi Jagathish in Town	Neelakandan	
2002	Yathrakarude Sradhakku	Paul	
2002	Nandanam	Kesavan Nair	
2002	Nammal	Shanmughan	
2002	Kalyanaraman	Ponjikkara Kesavan	
2003	Chronic Bachelor	Kuruvilla	
2003	Vellithira	Ittiyavira	
2003	Balettan	Achumama	
2003	Pattalam	Sivasankaran Nair	
2003	Ammakilikkoodu	Eradi	
2003	Manassinakkare	Chacko Mappila	
2004	Thalamelam	Kunjukuttan Thampuran	
2004	Vamanapuram Bus Route	Chandran Pillai	
2004	Wanted	Unni's Uncle	
2004	Vettam	K. T. Mathew	
2004	Chitrakoodam	Balan	
2004	Kaazhcha	Fr. Kuriakose	
2004	Greetings	Aravindakshan Nair	
2004	Maampazhakkaalam	Chandran's Uncle	
2004	Vesham	Pappan	
2004	Made in USA	Prof. Ponnachan PHD	
2005	Achuvinte Amma	Paulose	
2005	Thaskara Veeran	Eappachan	
2005	Ben Johnson	Chief Minister Raman Pilla	
2005	Udayon	Rarichan	
2005	Naran	Kelappan	
2005	Thanmathra	Sukumaran Nair	
2005	Bus Conductor	Majeed	
2006	Malamaal Weekly	Joseph Anthony Fernandes	
2006	Kilukkam Kilukilukkam	Kittunni	
2006	Lion	Thomman Chacko	
2006	Rasathanthram	Manikandan Aashari	
2006	Thuruppu Gulan	Kochu Thoma	
2006	Aanachandham	Kochuraman	
2006	Mahasamudram	Velankanni	
2006	Yes Your Honour	Venugopal	
2006	Baba Kalyani	Car Dealer	
2007	Inspector Garud	Raghavan	
2007	Big B	Tomy Parekkaadan	
2007	Vinodayathra	Thankachan	
2007	Aakasham	Varghese Abraham Pathirikkodan	
2007	July 4	Narayanan Potty	
2007	Bharathan Effect	Thankachan's father	
2007	Mission 90 Days	Sivaram's father	
2007	Ali Bhai	Khalid Ahemmed Sayivu	
2007	Nasrani	Fr.Pullikottil	
2007	Katha Parayumbol	Eepachan Muthalali	
2008	Calcutta News	Kerala samajam president	
2008	Innathe Chintha Vishayam	Emmanuel	
2008	Jubilee	Thomas Kora	
2008	Apoorva		
2008	Madampi	Karayogam President	
2008	Veruthe Oru Bharya	Rajasekharan	
2008	Bullet	Mahadevan	
2008	Kerala Police	Philip Tharakan	
2008	Shakespeare M.A. Malayalam	Mathanoor Avarachan	
2008	Twenty:20	Kuttikrishnan	
2009	Duplicate	P Suresh	
2009	Bhagyadevatha	Mathew Palakkal	
2009	Ee Pattanathil Bhootham	Krishnan	
2009	Patham Nilayile Theevandi	Sankara Narayanan	
2009	Kancheepurathe Kalyanam	Balakrishnan Nair	
2009	My Big Father	Thomaskutty	
2009	Colours	Pushkaran Pillai	
2009	Samastha Keralam PO		
2009	Swantham Lekhakan	Kaimal	
2009	Evidam Swargamanu	Divakara Kaimal, Revenue Secretary	

===== 2010s =====
Year	Title	Role	Notes
2010	Pranchiyettan & the Saint	Vasu Menon	
2010	Kadha Thudarunnu	Lasar	
2010	Aagathan	Lawrence	
2010	Kanyakumari Express	Minister	
2010	Again Kasargod Khader Bhai	Father Francis Tharakandam	
2010	Cheriya Kallanum Valiya Policeum		
2010	Pappy Appacha	Nirappel Mathai	
2010	Oridathoru Postman	Gangadharan	
2010	Cocktail	Kalyan Krishnan	
2010	Marykkundoru Kunjaadu	Ittichan Muthalali	
2011	Swapna Sanchari	Achuthan Nair	
2011	Oru Marubhoomikkadha	Mathai	
2011	Pachuvum Kovalanum	Bhadranpillai	
2011	Doctor Love	Sathyasheelan	
2011	Living Together	Krishnaprasad Kartha	
2011	Snehaveedu	Mathai	
2012	Doctor Innocent aanu	Doctor Bhargavan Pillai	
2012	Naughty Professor	Mulavarikkal Francis	
2012	Chattakaari	Morris	
2012	Kaashh	Devasia	
2012	Mullassery Madhavan Kutty Nemom P. O.	Vikraman Nair	
2012	Perinoru Makan	Harischandran	
2012	Bhoopadathil Illatha Oridam	Police Officer	
2012	Arike	Kalpana's father	
2012	Husbands in Goa	Nadar (TTE)	
2012	Puthiya Theerangal	Father Michael	
2013	Oru Indian Pranayakatha	Uthuppu Vallikkadan	
2013	Punyalan Agarbattis	John Thakkolkaran	
2013	Geethaanjali	Thankappan	
2013	Philips and the Monkey Pen	God	
2014	Mannar Mathai Speaking 2	Mannar Mathai	
2014	Malayalakkara Residency		
2014	Polytechnic	Chandrakumar	
2014	Bhaiyya Bhaiyya	Kochuveettil Chacko	
2014	Njangalude Veettile Athidhikal	Sreedharan	
2014	Nagara Varidhi Naduvil Njan	Davis	
2014	Aamayum Muyalum	Nallavan	
2014	Thomson Villa	Fr. Thomas Ambalakkadu	
2015	Ennum Eppozhum	Kariyachan	
2015	Urumbukal Urangarilla	Madhavettan	
2015	Kanal	Natesan	
2015	Chirakodinja Kinavukal	Mapranam Karayogam President T. P. V. Kurup	
2016	Swarna Kaduva	Lolappan	
2016	Oppam	Jayaraman's father	
2017	Jomonte Suvisheshangal	Palodan	
2017	Georgettan's Pooram	Narrator	
2017	Pullikkaran Staraa	Omanakshan Pillai	
2017	GandhiNagaril Unniyarcha		
2017	Chippy		
2017	Kambhoji		
2017	Punyalan Private Limited		Voice Only
2017	Aana Alaralodalaral	Pathrose	
2018	Kuttanadan Marpappa	Ummachan	
2018	Njan Marykutty	Priest	
2018	Suvarna Purushan	Rappayi	
2018	Odiyan	Gopi Mash	
2019	Irupathiyonnaam Noottaandu	Bishop	
2019	Lonappante Mamodeesa	School Teacher	Guest Appearance
2019	Driving License	Himself	Guest Appearance (voice only)
2019	Ganagandharvan	Appukutta Panicker	
2019	An International Local Story	Parameshwaran Panikkar	
2019	The Gambler		
2019	Jack & Daniel	Home Minister Koyapparamban	
2019	Aakasha Ganga 2	Ramavarma Thampuran	Photo Archive
2019	Munthiri Monchan	Menon	

===== 2020s =====
Year	Title	Role	Notes
2020	Dhamaka	Pauly's father	
2021	Sunny	Doctor Eerali	voice only
2021	Marakkar: Lion of the Arabian Sea	Namath Kurup	
2021	Tsunami	Eepachan	
2022	Makal	Dr. Govindan	
2022	Thirimali	Devassy	
2022	Kaduva	Fr. Vattassheril	
2022	Naale	Innocent	Short Film
2023	Pachuvum Athbutha Vilakkum	Vasumaman	
2023	Philip's	Mani uncle	

==== Other language films ====
Year	Title	Role	Language
1998	Doli Saja Ke Rakhna	Retired Colonel R.C Nair	Hindi
2003	Lesa Lesa	Nair	Tamil
2004	Nothing But Life	Prof. Ponnachan PhD	English
2006	Malamaal Weekly	Anthony	Hindi
2012	Shikari	Sitharam Setu	Kannada
2019	Naan Avalai Sandhitha Pothu	Film producer	Tamil

=== Story ===
- Pavam IA Ivachan (1994)
- Keerthanam (1995)

=== Producer ===
- Vida Parayum Munpe (1981)
- Ilakkangal (1982)
- Ormakkayi (1982)
- Lekhayude Maranam Oru Flashback (1983)

=== Playback singing ===
- Aanachandam – Gajakesariyogam (1990)
- Kandallo – Sandram (1990)
- Kunukupenmaniye – Mr Butler (2000)
- Onnam Malakeri – Kalyanaraman (2002)
- Chendakkoru kolundeda – Manassinakkare (2003)
- Sundarakeralam – Doctor Innocentanu (2012)
- SaMaGaReSa - Tsunami (2021)

=== Television ===
Year	Title	Role	Channel
1994	Innocent Kadhakal	Himself	Asianet
1994	Chithrageetham	Host	Doordarshan
2005-2006	Innocent Kadhakal	Host	Amrita TV
2013	Point blank	Guest	Asianet News
2016	J B junction	Guest	Kairali TV
2016	Badai Bungalow	Guest	Asianet
2016	Comedy Carnival	himself	Mazhavil Manorama
2017	Comedy super night 2	guest	Flowers TV
2017	Star Chat	Guest	WE TV
2018	Top Singer	Celebrity Judge	Flowers TV
2018	Nakshatra thilakkam	Guest	Mazhavil Manorama
2018	Chaya Koppayile kodum kattu	Mentor	Mazhavil Manorama
2019	Utsavam Super Star	Mentor	Flowers TV
2019–2021	Comedy star season 2	Judge	Asianet
2020	Kudumbavilakku	Himself	Asianet
2020-2021	Comedy Masters	Judge	Amrita TV
2021	Anchinodu Inchodinchu	Guest	Surya TV
2021	Top Singer season 2	Celebrity Judge	Flowers TV
2021–2023	Eenangalude Gandharvan	Judge	Flowers TV
2021–2023	Funs opon a time	Judge	Amrita TV
2021–2023	Music Ulasavam	Judge	Flowers TV

Lok Sabha
Preceded by K. P. Dhanapalan	Member of Parliament for Chalakudy; 2014 – 2019	Succeeded by Benny Behanan
