= Pakshe =

- Theatrical release poster
- Directed by: Mohan
- Written by: Cheriyan Kalpakavadi
- Produced by: Mohan Kumar
- Starring: Mohanlal; Shobhana
- Cinematography: Saroj Padi
- Edited by: G. Murali
- Music by: Johnson
- Production company: Kairali Films
- Distributed by: VIP Release
- Release date: 1994
- Running time: 154 minutes
- Country: India
- Language: Malayalam

Pakshe (titled onscreen as Pakshay; transl. However) is a 1994 Indian Malayalam-language drama film written by Cheriyan Kalpakavadi and directed by Mohan. It stars Mohanlal and Shobhana. The film was critically acclaimed.

== Plot ==
"Pakshe" revolves around the tragic and sacrificial life of Balachandra Menon, an IAS officer. Balan was brought up in a poor family whose properties were sold by his father to fund his legal cases. Unniyettan is Balan's teacher who motivates him to become an IAS officer. Balan is in love with Nandini, an aspiring writer and belongs to a rich family. Their relationship is accepted by both the families and a marriage date is fixed. Balan successfully completes the IAS exams

Unfortunately, Balan's father commits suicide, after losing the long drawn out case for which he had sold all his family properties and borrowed heavily and incurring huge debts, which Balan has to repay.

Balan who had passed the UPSC written exam also successfully completes the interview. In the meanwhile, the private money lenders harass him, asking him to repay the loans incurred by his father, and abuse him publicly, which leads to altercation between them and following these incidents, Nandini's family withdraws from the marriage arrangement and Nandini is not permitted to leave her house to meet with Balan. When the money lenders are about to take legal action for recovery of their dues, Vikaraman, a contractor is willing to offer Balan the money to settle the dues under the condition that he marries his daughter Raji. When Balan speaks to Nandini about this, she insists that he marries the girl and rescue his family. With a heavy heart, they decide to split calling it a "sacrifice" for their family.

Balan, after marrying Rajeswari, aka Raji, repays all his debts. Raji is an arrogant woman and ill treats Balan and they endure a bad marital relationship. Vikaraman, his father-in-law, abuses Balan's position as the Revenue Secretary to unscrupulously help his friends, and at one stage, when Balan refuses to cooperate, he is abused and criticized by his wife and father in law. Vikraman had forced him to become corrupted. Heartbroken, Balan, who was so far living in his Vikraman's house, decides to go and live alone, but Raji refuses to accompany him and insults his family for no reason . Feeling insulted and angry he slaps Raji and shouts at Vikraman too. In a fit of rage, he leaves home. He spends the rest of that day at the residence of his superior officer, Shivadasa Menon who consoles him.

The next morning he goes to the Secretariat and takes a week's leave from work and stays at a beach resort for a few days of relaxation and peace of mind, where he finds an amusing middle aged man, named Eenashu, who has a happy outlook to life and says he keeps himself young and sprightly through liquor and women. A friendship develops between them, which makes Balan forget his miseries for a while. Later, one day, Shivadasa Menon calls him and tells him that Vikraman has begun his movements for Joint Divorce Petition. The next day, Shivadasan goes to the resort where Balan was staying to make him sign the petition since, Vikraman had forced him to do so.

One evening at the resort, he is shocked and surprised to know that Nandini is staying at the neighbouring cottage. He also learns that she is now an internationally acclaimed writer, and that she is still single, not having married anyone. After the initial hesitant moments, they gradually share their life stories, and gradually the old balettan-nandinikutty bond of yesteryear is revived. Due to Eanashu's influence on him, he has also slowly erased Raji from his mind.

Slowly the old romance is revived between them, and both decide to live together thereafter, but fatefully, on the day they are about to leave the resort, Rajeswari, his wife and their children turn up. In his absence, she has realised her mistakes and asks for him to forgive her and accept her and the children back into his life. Nandini, coming to know of his, with a heavy heart, realises what is happening and Balan accepts Rajeswari and the children. Balan and Nandini suffer the pain of separation for the second time in their life.

The film ends with Balan set to go back to his new life with Rajeswari, while Nandini beginning a new life with memories of her life with Balan.

== Cast ==
- Mohanlal as Balachandra Menon IAS / Balan, Revenue Secretary of Kerala
- Shobhana as Nandini Menon ('Nandinikutty'), Balachandran's Ex-Lover (Voice by Bhagyalekshmi)
- Shanthi Krishna as Rajeswari (Raji), Balachandran's Wife (Voice by Aanandavally)
- Innocent as Eenashu
- Thilakan as Vikraman Contractor, Rajeswari's Father
- M. G. Soman as Shivadasa Menon IAS, Chief Secretary of Kerala
- Jagathy Sreekumar as Kaimal, Vikraman Contractor's Assistant
- Karamana Janardanan Nair as Mohan, Balachandran's Father
- Sukumari as Lathika, Balachandran's Mother
- Mamukkoya as Nanappan
- Ganesh Kumar as Shivan, Nandini's Brother
- Venu Nagavally as Unniyettan
- Kozhikode Narayanan Nair as Hari, Nandini's Father
- Spadikam George as Revenue Minister Chacko
- Krishna Prasad

== Soundtrack ==
The film had successful soundtrack composed by Johnson, with lyrics by K. Jayakumar.

Track	Song title	Singer(s)	Other notes
1	"Sooryamshuvoro"	K. J. Yesudas, Ganga	Raga: Mohanam
2	"Moovanthiyaay"	K. J. Yesudas	Raga: Jog
3	"Nirangalil"	M. G. Sreekumar	
4	"Get Me The"	Malgudi Subha	
