= Vadaka Veedu =

- Directed by: Mohan
- Written by: Vijayan; Dr Pavithran (dialogues)
- Screenplay by: Dr. Pavithran
- Produced by: Mubarak
- Starring: Sukumari; Anupama; Sukumaran; Ittoop
- Cinematography: U. Rajagopal
- Edited by: G. Venkittaraman
- Music by: M. S. Viswanathan; Lyrics: Bichu Thirumala
- Production company: Sulfikar Movies
- Distributed by: Sulfikar Movies
- Release date: 9 February 1979
- Country: India
- Language: Malayalam

Vadaka Veedu is a 1979 Indian Malayalam film, directed by Mohan and produced by Mubarak. The film stars Sukumari, Anupama, Sukumaran and Ittoop in the lead roles. The film has musical score by M. S. Viswanathan.

== Cast ==
- Sukumari
- Anupama
- Sukumaran
- Ittoop
- Master Sujith
- P. K. Abraham
- Ravi Menon
- Vidhubala
- Innocent

== Soundtrack ==
The music was composed by M. S. Viswanathan and the lyrics were written by Bichu Thirumala.

No.	Song	Singers	Lyrics	Length (m:ss)
1	"Aayiram Sugandha"	P. Jayachandran	Bichu Thirumala	
2	"Maarivillinte Panthal"	Vani Jairam	Bichu Thirumala	
3	"Sugama Sangeetham Thulumbum"	S. Janaki	Bichu Thirumala	
