= Randu Penkuttikal =

- Directed by: Mohan
- Screenplay by: Surasu
- Based on: Randu Penkuttikal by V. T. Nandakumar
- Starring: Shoba; Anupama Mohan; Madhu; Sukumaran
- Cinematography: U. Rajagopal
- Edited by: G. Venkitaraman
- Music by: M. S. Viswanathan; Lyrics: Bichu Thirumala
- Production company: Sree Ganesh Kalamandir
- Distributed by: Angel Films
- Release date: 28 April 1978
- Country: India
- Language: Malayalam

Randu Penkuttikal is a 1978 Indian Malayalam-language film directed by Mohan from a screenplay by Surasu, which is partially based on the novel of the same name by V. T. Nandakumar. It is one of the earliest films in Malayalam to explore themes of lesbianism in a nuanced manner. Director and film producer P. Stanley (Varadakshina/ Mochanam/Thoovanathumbikal) first acquired the rights to the story after reading the novel but was discouraged from making it into a film by a close friend. He then resold the rights to Mohan after the latter requested it (Stanley's health issues were also a contributing factor in his decision to give up the story). In a later interview, director Mohan said that he had never read the novel completely, before or after the making of this film. He adapted the title as well as the lead characters but asked Surasu to weave a script based on those characters and not necessarily based on the novel. However, V. T. Nandakumar is given credit for the story.

== Plot ==
One of the earliest movies to explore the theme of lesbianism in a normalised way.

== Cast ==
- Shoba
- Anupama Mohan
- Madhu
- Sukumaran
- Jayan as Collector (Guest Role)
- Surasu
- Janardhanan
- Vidhubala
- Innocent
- Jalaja
- Santhadevi
- Sukumari
- P. K. Abraham

== Soundtrack ==
The music was composed by M. S. Viswanathan and the lyrics were written by Bichu Thirumala and Randor Guy.

No.	Song	Singers	Lyrics	Length (m:ss)
1	"Entharivoo Nee"	P. Jayachandran	Bichu Thirumala	
2	"Njaayarum Thinkalum"	P. Jayachandran	Bichu Thirumala	
3	"Sruthimandalam"	P. Jayachandran, Chorus	Bichu Thirumala	
4	"Where There Is"	Usha Uthup	Randor Guy	
