= Kochu Kochu Thettukal =

- Directed by: Mohan
- Written by: P. Padmarajan
- Screenplay by: P. Padmarajan
- Starring: Sukumaran; Sukumari; Hema Choudhary; Innocent; Beena; Shubha
- Cinematography: U. Rajagopal
- Edited by: G. Venkittaraman
- Music by: Shyam
- Production company: Apoorva Arts
- Distributed by: Apoorva Arts
- Release date: 22 February 1980
- Country: India
- Language: Malayalam

Kochu Kochu Thettukal is a 1980 Indian Malayalam film, directed by Mohan. The film stars Sukumaran, Hema Choudhary, Innocent, Beena and Shubha in the lead roles. The film has musical score by Shyam.

== Cast ==
- Sukumaran
- Hema Chaudhary
- Shubha
- Sathyakala
- K. P. Ummer
- Sukumari
- Innocent
- Paravoor Bharathan
- Santhakumari
- Kalasala Babu

== Soundtrack ==
The music was composed by Shyam and the lyrics were written by Bichu Thirumala.

No.	Song	Singers	Lyrics	Length (m:ss)
1	"Prabhaatha Gaanangal"	S. Janaki, Chorus	Bichu Thirumala	
2	"Thulaabharamallo Jeevitham"	K. J. Yesudas, Latha Raju	Bichu Thirumala	
