= Rachana (film) =

1983 film directed by Mohan

- Poster
- Directed by: Mohan
- Written by: Antony Eastman; John Paul (dialogues)
- Screenplay by: John Paul
- Produced by: Sivan Kunnampilly
- Starring: Nedumudi Venu; Bharath Gopi; Srividya; Mammootty
- Cinematography: Vasanth Kumar
- Edited by: G. Murali
- Music by: M. B. Sreenivasan
- Production company: Thushara Films
- Distributed by: Thushara Films
- Release date: 10 March 1983
- Country: India
- Language: Malayalam

Rachana (transl. A literary creation) is a 1983 Indian Malayalam film, directed by Mohan and produced by Sivan Kunnampilly. The film stars Srividya, Nedumudi Venu, Bharath Gopi and Mammootty in the lead roles. The film has musical score by M. B. Sreenivasan. Bharath Gopi won the Kerala State Film Award for Best Actor and the Kerala Film Critics' Award for Best Actor for his performance in the film. Srividya won the Kerala State Film award for Best Actress for her performance in the same movie.

== Plot ==
The title serves as a literal and thematic metaphor for the film's plot. An eccentric novelist treats the real people around him as characters for a psychological experiment to inspire his next book.

== Cast ==
- Srividya as Sarada
- Nedumudi Venu as Achyuthanunni
- Bharath Gopi as Sreeprasad
- Mammootty as Gopi
- Jagathy Sreekumar as Thomas
- Vijay Menon as Rajan
- Poornima Jayaram as Thulasi
- Thrissur Elsy as Thomas's wife

== Soundtrack ==
The music was composed by M. B. Sreenivasan and the lyrics were written by Mullanezhi.

No.	Song	Singers	Lyrics	Length (m:ss)
1	"Kaalamayoorame"	S. Janaki	Mullanezhi	
2	"Onnaanaam Kaattile"	S. Janaki, Unni Menon	Mullanezhi	

== Awards ==
Kerala State Film Awards

- Kerala State Film Award for Best Actor – Bharat Gopy
- Kerala State Film award for Best Actress – Srividya

Kerala Film Critics' Award

- Best Actor – Bharat Gopy
