= Sakshyam =

- Directed by: Mohan
- Written by: Cherian Kalpakavadi
- Produced by: K. R. Balakrishnan and Rajan Manakkalathu
- Starring: Murali; Suresh Gopi; Gautami; Manju Warrier
- Cinematography: SarojPadi
- Edited by: Murali
- Music by: Johnson
- Release date: 21 December 1995
- Country: India
- Language: Malayalam

Sakshyam (സാക്ഷ്യം, English: Witness) is a 1995 Malayalam-language film directed by Mohan and written by Cherian Kalpakavadi. Produced by K. R. Balakrishnan and Rajan Manakkalathu, the film stars Murali, Suresh Gopi, Gautami, and Manju Warrier, while Innocent and Nedumudi Venu play supporting roles. The film marks Warrier's debut. The music was composed by Johnson, and the film released on 21 December 1995.

== Plot ==
Brigadier Raj Nambiar is an Indian Army officer and his neighbor Dr. Sunny an army doctor. A flashback shows Raj receiving a call from the hospital, alerting him that his wife Susanna's health is deteriorating. Upon receiving this news, he goes to a convent to get his daughter, Smitha. He takes her on a trip to see her mother. On the journey, he recalls forgotten memories of Susanna.

One of these memories is of how he and Susanna met. Raj was a flirt, alcoholic and excessive smoker. When Susanna ignores his flirtations, he becomes determined to get her. He gets his friend Sunny to sway Susanna into liking him and they eventually marry.

Raj is from a former royal family, which disapproves of her. As time passes, tensions relax between Raj's family and Susanna, though the relations between the couple are tense. After a year of marriage, the couple does not have a child. This is a source of gossip for Raj's family. Raj drinks and becomes depressed over his childlessness. One day, while drunk, he tells Susanna that he does not want to live with her anymore, and so she leaves him.

Raj's mother dies suddenly. A family member tells Raj that his mother asked for Susanna before her death. Hearing this, Raj is moved to reunite with Susanna and they resume their life together.

Raj throws a farewell party for Sunny, who has been promoted and transferred to Hyderabad. During this party, Raj announces that his wife is pregnant. The story skips to years later at a resort where Raj, his daughter Smitha, and Susanna are on holiday. They run into Sunny, who is now rich and married and has a daughter. Raj later receives a phone call saying that Sunny was the only survivor in an accident with his family. Sunny becomes an alcoholic and loses his medical license after he gives a patient the wrong medicine. Raj invites Sunny to live with him. One day, Susanna calls Raj, telling him to send Sunny away because he is an alcoholic and dangerous.

Another day, Raj gets a call from the police, who inform him that Sunny is dead and Susanna is the killer. Susanna is jailed and refuses to explain. Years pass, and Raj gets a call that Susanna is on her deathbed. When Raj and his daughter arrive, Susanna gives him her diary to read only when he returns to his house.

The diary reveals that Sunny and Susanna had had a relationship prior to her marriage. Due to Sunny's financial difficulties, they ended the relationship, and Sunny later encourages Susanna to marry Raj. When Raj wanted a divorce, Susanna tried to commit suicide but was stopped by Sunny. The two had an affair. Just when Sunny was about to call Raj and tell him of his love for Susanna, Raj reunited with her. Her diary also reveals that when Sunny's wife and daughter died, Sunny came back mainly to steal away Susanna's child, whom Susanna never liked. Sunny threatened to leave the child and take Susanna away with him. Susanna pointed a gun at Sunny, who tells her to kill him. He closes his hand over hers and forces her hand, killing himself. Susanna could have told the true story, but felt she deserved the punishment for her infidelity.

After finishing the diary, Raj rushes back to Susanna, who dies in front of him.

== Cast ==
- Murali as Col. Rajasekharan Nambiar
- Suresh Gopi as Military Doctor Sunny
- Gautami as Susanna
- Manju Warrier as Smitha
- Annie as Daisy Sunny
- Innocent as Chittappan
- Venu Nagavalli as Military Dr. Narendran
- Kunchan as Paulose
- Geetha Vijayan as Mariamma
- Nedumudi Venu as Dominic Fernandes
- T. P. Madhavan as Amavan
- Kundara Johnny as Major
- K. R. Vatsala as Raj's aunt
