= Sruthi (film) =

- Directed by: Mohan
- Written by: Nedumudi Venu; Mohan (dialogues)
- Screenplay by: Mohan
- Produced by: M. N. Murali; Sivan Kunnampilly
- Starring: Nedumudi Venu; Geetha; Mukesh; Thilakan; KPAC Lalitha
- Cinematography: Saroj Padi
- Edited by: G. Murali
- Music by: Johnson
- Production company: Thushara Films
- Distributed by: Thushara Films
- Release date: 17 March 1987
- Country: India
- Language: Malayalam

Sruthi is a 1987 Indian Malayalam film, directed by Mohan and produced by M. N. Murali and Sivan Kunnampilly. The film stars Nedumudi Venu, Geetha, Mukesh, Thilakan and KPAC Lalitha in the lead roles. The film has musical score by Johnson.

== Plot ==
Subhadra and Raman lead a happy married life. However, things take a turn when her music teacher tries to take advantage of her.

== Cast ==
- Nedumudi Venu as Ramavarma Thampuran
- Geetha as Subhadra Thampuratti
- Mukesh as Pradeep
- Thilakan as Aasan
- Sreenivasan as Varghese
- KPAC Lalitha as Ramavarma's Mother
- Ravi Menon as Sadanandan
- Valsala Menon as Karthyayani
- Sankaradi as Kesava Menon
- Jagannathan as Achuthan Marar

== Soundtrack ==
The music was composed by Johnson and the lyrics were written by Balachandran Chullikkad.

| No. | Song | Singers | Lyrics | Length (m:ss) |
|---|---|---|---|---|
| 1 | "Cheekithirukiya" | Unni Menon, Lathika | Balachandran Chullikkad | |
| 2 | "Leelaaravindam" | K. S. Chithra | Balachandran Chullikkad | |
| 3 | "Nimishamaam" | K. J. Yesudas | Balachandran Chullikkad | |
| 4 | "Onam Vannu" (Bit) | Unni Menon, Chorus, Lathika | Balachandran Chullikkad | |
