= Revathikkoru Pavakkutty =

- Movie Poster
- Directed by: Sathyan Anthikad
- Written by: John Paul; Ravi Vallathol
- Screenplay by: John Paul
- Produced by: Shahid Koker; Siyad Koker
- Starring: Bharath Gopi; Mohanlal; Radha; Menaka; Lizy
- Cinematography: Anandakuttan
- Edited by: K. Rajagopal
- Music by: Shyam
- Production company: Kokers Films
- Distributed by: Kokers Films
- Release date: 8 March 1986
- Country: India
- Language: Malayalam

Revathikkoru Pavakkutty (Translation: A doll for Revathi) is a 1986 Malayalam film by Sathyan Anthikkad starring Bharath Gopi, Mohanlal and Radha. The film is an adaptation of the stage play of the same name by Ravi Vallathol.

== Plot ==
Revathi's (Lizy) parents separated when she was young; she was raised by her mother, who taught her that her father (Bharath Gopi) was a bad man. Years later, while on his deathbed, her father makes a last wish to see his daughter. Revathi refuses to go, so her orphan friend Susanna (Radha) goes in her place to fulfill his wish. Revathi's father is very happy to be with Susanna, thinking she is Revathy but Susanna dies. Finally Revathy returns home after the death of Susanna, but her visit fails to move a grief-stricken father.

== Cast ==
- Bharath Gopi as Balan Menon
- Mohanlal as Dr. P. Madhavankutty
- Radha as Susanna
- Menaka as Indu
- Lizy as Revathi Menon
- Sukumari as Devootty
- Innocent as Bhasi Pillai
- Bahadoor as Ayyappan Pillai
- Jagathy Sreekumar as Kalyan Kumar
- Mala Aravindan as Vaidyar Rarichan Nair

== Soundtrack ==
All lyrics are written by Bichu Thirumala; all music is composed by Shyam.

Track listing
No.	Title	Artist(s)	Length
1.	"Chinnakkutti Chellakkutti Thankakkatti" (Male)	K. J. Yesudas, Choir
2.	"Chinnukkutti Chellakkutti Thankakkatti" (Female)	K. S. Chithra, Choir
3.	"Vellaaram Kunnummele"	K. J. Yesudas
