= Niram Marunna Nimishangal =

- Directed by: Mohan
- Written by: Perumpadavam Sreedharan
- Screenplay by: Perumpadavam Sreedharan
- Starring: Jayabharathi; Sukumaran
- Cinematography: B. Kannan
- Edited by: G. Venkittaraman
- Music by: Shyam
- Production company: Navadarsana Films
- Distributed by: Navadarsana Films
- Release date: 19 February 1982
- Country: India
- Language: Malayalam

Niram Marunna Nimishangal is a 1982 Indian Malayalam film, directed by Mohan. The film stars Jayabharathi and Sukumaran in the lead roles. The film has musical score by Shyam.

== Cast ==
- Jayabharathi
- Sukumaran

== Soundtrack ==
The music was composed by Shyam and the lyrics were written by Bichu Thirumala.

No.	Song	Singers	Lyrics	Length (m:ss)
1	"Nanma Niranjori"	S. Janaki, Chorus	Bichu Thirumala	
2	"Omanakal"	S. Janaki	Bichu Thirumala	
3	"Sooryodayam Veendum Varum"	K. J. Yesudas, Chorus	Bichu Thirumala	
