= Raghu (given name) =

Raghu or Reghu (Devanagari: रघु) is an Indian masculine given name. Notable people with the name include:

- A. T. Raghu, Indian director, producer, screenplay writer and actor.
- Bheeman Raghu (born 1953), Indian film actor
- M. V. Raghu, Indian film cinematographer, director, screenwriter, and producer
- Palghat R. Raghu (1928–2009), Indian Carnatic musician and percussionist
- R. Raghu, Indian film director and television producer
- Raghu Babu, Telugu comedian
- Raghu Dixit, Indian singer-songwriter, producer, and film score composer
- Raghu Karnad, Indian journalist and writer
- Raghu Karumanchi, Indian actor
- Raghu Kunche, Indian film music director, playback singer and actor
- Raghu Mukherjee, Indian Kannada film actor and model
- Raghu Ram (born 1973), Indian television producer and actor
- Raghu Ramakrishnan, Indian researcher in the areas of database and information management
- Raghu Veera Reddy (born 1957), Indian politician
- Reghu Kumar (1953–2014), Indian music composer
- Raghu Rai (1942–2026), Indian photographer and photojournalist
- Raghu Raj Bahadur (1924–1997), Indian statistician
- Dinesh Raghu Raman, Indian military officer
- Raghu Ram Pillarisetti, Indian oncoplastic breast surgeon
- Raghu Vira (1902–1963), Indian linguist, scholar and politician
- Rangayana Raghu (born 1965), Indian film and stage actor
