= Mohan (director) =

Indian film director (1948–2024)

- Born: 15 January 1948; Irinjalakkuda, Cochin, India
- Died: 27 August 2024 (aged 76); Kochi, Kerala, India
- Occupations: Film director, screenwriter
- Years active: 1974–2005
- Notable work: Shalini Ente Koottukari, Randu Penkuttikal, Mukham, Pakshe
- Spouse: Anupama Mohan
- Children: Purandar Mohan; Upendar Mohan

M. Mohan (15 January 1948 – 27 August 2024) was an Indian director of Malayalam films. He is regarded as a pioneer of the new wave in Malayalam cinema. Mohan has done several notable acclaimed films including Pakshe, Isabella, Oru Katha Oru Nunnakkatha, Idavela, Vida Parayum Munpe, Randu Penkuttikal and Shalini Ente Koottukari. He has scripted five films, Angene Oru Avadhikkalathu, Mukham, Sruthi, Alolam and Vida Parayum Munpe, and wrote the story of two films, Ithile Iniyum Varu and Kathayariyathe.

Mohan's association with screenwriter John Paul has always spawned critically and commercially successful films. He has also associated with master writer Padmarajan in the films Idavela, Kochu Kochu Thettukal and Shalini Ente Koottukari. He predominantly worked during the 1980s, the golden era of Malayalam cinema.

== Personal life and death ==
Mohan was born in Irinjalakuda on 15 January 1948. He was married to actress Anupama, the heroine of his film Randu Penkuttikal. She is a renowned Kuchipudi dancer. The couple had two sons: Purandar and Upendhar.

Mohan died in Kochi, Kerala on 27 August 2024, at the age of 76.

== Filmography ==
- Vadaka Veedu (1978)
- Shalini Ente Koottukari (1978)
- Randu Pen Kuttikal (1978)
- Surya Daham (1979)
- Kochu Kochu Thettukal (1979)
- Vida Parayum Mumbe (1981)
- Kathayariyathe (1981)
- Niram Marunna Nimishangal (1982)
- Ilakkangal (1982)
- Idavela (1982)
- Alolam (1982)
- Rachana (1983)
- Mangalam Nerunnu (1984)
- Oru Katha Oru Nunnakkatha (1986)
- Theertham (1987)
- Sruthi (1987)
- Isabella (1988)
- Mukham (1990)
- Pakshe (1994)
- Sakshyam (1995)
- Angene Oru Avadhikkalathu (1999)
- The Campus (2005)
