= Kathodu Kathoram =

Kaathodu Kaathoram
- VCD cover
- Directed by: Bharathan
- Screenplay by: John Paul
- Story by: Bharathan
- Produced by: M. G. Gopinath (Pandalam Gopinath); G. P. Vijayakumar
- Starring: Mammootty; Nedumudi Venu; Innocent; Saritha
- Cinematography: C. H. Saroj Padi
- Edited by: Suresh
- Music by: Songs: Ouseppachan; Bharathan; Score: Ouseppachan
- Production company: Seven Arts Films
- Distributed by: Seven Arts Release
- Release date: 15 November 1985
- Country: India
- Language: Malayalam

Kaathodu Kaathoram is a 1985 Indian Malayalam-language drama film, directed by Bharathan, and starring Mammootty and Saritha in the lead roles. Bharathan himself composed the title song, while the rest of the songs and background score were composed by Ouseppachan.

== Synopsis ==
Louis arrives at a village looking for a job. He meets Marykutty, who allows him to stay at her residence. A storm rages all night, and the roof of the house is damaged. The next day, Louis, along with Kuttan (Mary's child), fix the roof. Teresa, Mary's sister comes there to visit Mary. She is a nun at a local convent. Years ago, their father, Paily left home for some unknown reason. Lazar, a driver, then forcibly marries Marykutty. They then have a child. Lazar now lusts after Teresa. To escape his advances, Marykutty pleads with Teresa to go away. Teresa and Marykutty now are under the care of the parish priest. But Lazar, now poisoned by Rappai, comes and extorts money from Marykutty every month.

The priest comes to visit the newcomer, Louis. He asks Louis to come to the church to do some repair work. Louis, a gifted musician, plays the organ at the church. Achen (the priest) quietly watches this and then applauds Louis. He asks Louis to write music for Achen's compositions, which is to be marketed as cassettes. Louis does excellent work, which Marykutty likes and is now starting to admire Louis. Rappai, who is also the sexton reports everything and emphasizes that Marykutty and Louis are having an affair. Lazar, intoxicated, rushes to Marykutty and a brawl breaks out between Louis and Lazar. Lazar says that Louis will die by his hands. Unexpectedly, Paily returns and acknowledges Louis as a good man. Both daughters are in tears as their father has returned. Achen comes to visit Paily and says that he is not to leave home again.

Achen asks Louis about Marykutty and says not to mingle with Lazar anymore. Achen then asks Louis to give music for another song. At an event, Lazar sees Louis and Marykutty singing together. They didn't react and instead stood silent. But Rappai could not keep his mouth closed. He kept saying rumours about Louis and Marykutty to the villagers. The congregation demand that Louis and Marykutty be evicted, as Marykutty is married and cannot have two relationships.

The next day, Achen performs holy rituals. The congregation is enraged seeing Louis and Marykutty. They demand that Louis and Marykutty to be banished. Louis walks out, followed by Marykutty. Outside, Lazar and Rappai wait for Marykutty, they grab her along with the congregation and cut Marykutty's hair, to disgrace her. Achen, Paily, and Teresa are helpless as the congregation does not allows them to leave. Louis is also held against his will.

Marykutty is devastated. She and Louis go out of the village. They resettle in an old woman's house far away from the village and live like a family. Marykutty remembers her golden days. But Rappai and Lazar abduct Kuttan. Louis and Marykutty desperately search for Kuttan. They find Kuttan at Rappai's residence. Rappai lashes out but is beaten black and blue by Louis. Louis and Marykutty rescue Kuttan. Lazar gets to know and searches for both. Lazar and Louis fight while Marykutty runs with Kuttan to find a safe place. Lazar pushes Louis and chases Marykutty. Eventually, Marykutty is caught, but Kuttan runs far away. Marykutty and Lazar fight and she slips along with Lazar. They then roll until they reach the end of a cliff. Louis and Kuttan also follow them. However, Lazar and Marykutty slip even further down to their death. Kuttan cries thinking he is alone now, but Louis holds his grief and says that he will be the father and guardian of Kuttan. Kuttan told Louis not to cry and consoles him, and finally, they hug each other.

== Cast ==
- Mammootty as Louis
- Nedumudi Venu as Priest (Achen)
- Saritha as Marykutty
- Innocent as Rappai
- Janardhanan as Lazar
- Master Prasobh as Kuttan
- Bahadoor as Paily
- Lissy as Teresa
- Philomina as Old Woman

== Soundtrack ==
All lyrics are written by O. N. V. Kurup; all music is composed by Ouseppachan except where noted. The song “Devadoothar Paadi” was later remixed in Nna Thaan Case Kodu (2022) as well as in Rekhachithram (2025).

No.	Title	Music	Artist(s)	Length
1.	"Devadoothar Paadi"		K. J. Yesudas, Lathika, Krishnachandran, Chorus
2.	"Kathodu Kathoram"	Bharathan	Lathika
3.	"Nee En Sarga Soundaryame"		K. J. Yesudas, Lathika
4.	"Nee En Sarga Soundaryame" (Bit)		Choir

== Legacy ==
The film was referenced in the flashback portions of the 2025 film Rekhachithram with a fictional incident which occurred during its shooting being part of the core plot.
