= John Paul (screenwriter) =

Indian screenwriter (1950–2022)

- Born: John Paul Puthusery; 29 October 1950; Ernakulam, Kerala, India
- Died: 23 April 2022 (aged 71); Kochi, Kerala, India
- Occupation: Screenwriter
- Years active: 1980–1997, 2009, 2019
- Known for: Cinema screenwriter
- Spouse: Aisha Elizabeth
- Children: 1

John Paul (29 October 1950 – 23 April 2022) was an Indian scriptwriter, producer, author, and actor who worked in Malayalam cinema. He was best known for his work in the 1980s and early 1990s.

== Early life ==
John Paul was born on 29 October 1950 in Ernakulam to parents Rebecca and P. V. Paulose (Paul). After completing his BA and MA in economics from Maharaja's College he joined Canara Bank in 1972. In 1983, he resigned the job to pursue film.

== Career ==
As a scriptwriter, he wrote many films, most notably for Bharathan.

He received the National Award for Best Environmentalist, the Film Critics Award For Script and Documentaries, the State Television Award, and a special jury award from International Federation of Film Critics. He was awarded the State Award For The Best Film Book for M.T. Oru Anuyathra. He produced Oru Cherupunchiri, which won state, national and international awards.

John Paul was the founding General Secretary for MACTA, an association for film technicians. In 2017 he acted in the film C/O Saira Banu along with Manju Warrier. He was also seen in a prominent role in Gangster, opposite Mammootty. His anecdotes about many actors and actresses in the Malayalam film industry were broadcast on Safari TV.

== Personal life and death ==
John Paul was married to Aisha Elizabeth and had a daughter Jisha Jibi. He died in Kochi on 23 April 2022 at the age of 71.

== Filmography ==
Year	Title	Director	Notes
1980	Chamaram	Bharathan	
1981	Marmaram	Bharathan	Along with Vijayan Karot
1981	Vida Parayum Munpe	Mohan	
1981	Kathayariyathe	Mohan	
1981	Aarathi	P. Chandrakumar	Story: Sasi Menon
1981	Ormakkayi	Bharathan	
1981	Thenum Vayambum	Ashok Kumar	
1981	Palangal	Bharathan	
1982	Alolam	Mohan	
1982	Ina	I. V. Sasi	Adaptation of The Blue Lagoon
1983	Sandhya Mayangum Neram	Bharathan	Story: Babu, Screenplay: Along with Bharathan
1983	Sagaram Santham	P. G. Viswambharan	
1983	Rachana	Mohan	
1983	Onnu Chirikku	P. G. Viswambharan	
1983	Asthram	P. N. Menon	Story: P. N. Menon
1984	Ithiripoove Chuvannapoove	Bharathan	Story: Thikkodiyan; Dialogues: T. Damodaran
1984	Ariyaatha Veethikal	K. S. Sethumadhavan	
1984	Onnanu Nammal	P. G. Viswambharan	
1984	Aarorumariyathe	K. S. Sethumadhavan	Story: Kamal
1984	Athirathram	I. V. Sasi	
1984	Aduthaduthu	Sathyan Anthikkad	
1984	Inakkily	Joshiy	Story: Cochin Haneefa
1985	Ee Lokam Evide Kure Manushyar	P. G. Viswambharan	Story: Antony Eastman
1985	Kathodu Kathoram	Bharathan	
1985	Iniyum Kadha Thudarum	Joshiy	
1985	Ee Sabdam Innathe Sabdam	P. G. Viswambharan	
1985	Adhyayam Onnu Muthal	Sathyan Anthikkad	
1985	Ambada Njane!	Antony Eastman	
1985	Aviduthepole Ivideyum	K. S. Sethumadhavan	
1985	Ee Thanalil Ithiri Neram	P. G. Viswambharan	
1985	Yathra	Balu Mahendra	
1985	Eeran Sandhya	Jeassy	Story: Dennis Joseph
1986	Mizhineerppoovukal	Kamal	
1986	Ice Cream	Antony Eastman	
1986	Ithile Iniyum Varu	P. G. Viswambharan	Story: Mohan
1986	Revathikkoru Pavakkutty	Sathyan Anthikkad	Story: Ravi Vallathol
1987	Unnikale Oru Kadha Parayam	Kamal	
1987	Oru Minnaminunginte Nurunguvettam	Bharathan	
1987	Vrutham	I. V. Sasi	Along with T. Damodaran
1987	Neela Kurinji Poothappol	Bharathan	
1987	Simon Peter Ninakku Vendi	P. G. Viswambharan	
1988	Unnikrishnante Adyathe Christmas	Kamal	
1988	Ulsavapittennu	Bharath Gopi	
1989	Oru Sayahnathinte Swapnam	Bharathan	
1990	Purappadu	Jeassy	
1990	Orukkam	K. Madhu	Story: Balachandran Chullikkad
1990	Randam Varavu	K. Madhu	
1991	Bhoomika	I. V. Sasi	
1991	Malootty	Bharathan	
1992	Soorya Gayathri	Anil	
1992	Pandu Pandoru Rajakumari	Viji Thampi	Stoy: Nedumudi Venu
1993	Chamayam	Bharathan	
1993	Samagamam	George Kithu	
1993	Oru Kadamkadha Pole	Joshy Mathew	Story: Nedumudi Venu
1995	Aksharam	Sibi Malayil	
1997	Oru Yathramozhi	Prathap Pothen	Story: Priyadarshan
1998	Manjiradhwani	Bharathan	
2009	Vellathooval	I. V. Sasi	
2009	Nammal Thammil	Viji Thampi	Story: Alex Kadavil
2019	Pranaya Meenukalude Kadal	Kamal	
2020	Teresa Had A Dream	Raju Abraham	
