= Shalini Ente Koottukari =

- Directed by: Mohan
- Written by: P. Padmarajan
- Produced by: Mithra
- Starring: Venu Nagavally; Shobha; Jalaja; Sukumaran
- Cinematography: U. Rajagopal
- Edited by: G. Venkitaraman
- Music by: G. Devarajan
- Release date: 1978
- Country: India
- Language: Malayalam

Shaalini Ente Koottukaari is a 1978 Indian Malayalam film, written by Padmarajan and directed by Mohan. The film is loosely based on a story of Padmarajan named "Parvathikutty". The film stars Venu Nagavally, Shobha, Jalaja and Sukumaran in the lead roles. The film has musical score by G. Devarajan. The movie is about the friendship between two young girls named Shalini and Ammu. When Shobha committed suicide, the movie was running successfully at the box office. The film was remade in Tamil as Sujatha (1980).

== Plot ==
The plot revolves around the life of Shalini, a young college girl, who faces emotional isolation in many places of life. Much of the story is revealed through the memories of Ammu, Shalini's intimate friend both in college and in their village. Shalini and her brother Prabha experience a sort of emotional trauma and loneliness in their home, especially in the presence of their adamant father and their stepmother. As Shalini is not satisfied with the barren life of her home, except in her attachment with her brother, she finds solace and comfort in the happiness provided by her college. As a young, smart and beautiful graduate student, she is attracted to many of the males of the campus, especially to Roy, one of the smartest boys of the college. But his love is rejected by Shalini, even though she felt a temporary fascination towards him. Later the suicide of her brother makes her life uneasy, as she experiences an emotional isolation. However, she overcomes the pain inflicted by the death. She returns to college with an aim to turn over a new leaf in her life. Here, she develops a love affair with a newly appointed, young and handsome lecturer Jayadevan. In the shade of his love, Shalini gains confidence and feels aspirations towards life. But this unnatural relationship between a teacher and his student stirs up a little trouble in their college. Both of them ignore this as a wretched part of the social outlook. But their relation doesn't culminate in marriage, because Shalini falls ill with a brain tumor. This evaporates her confidence and finally she succumbs, leaving Jayadevan alone in the world and leaving everlasting memories in the mind of Ammu.

== Cast ==
- Venu Nagavally as Prabha
- Shobha as Shalini
- Jalaja as Ammu
- Sukumaran as Jayadevan
- K. P. Ummer as Shalini's Father
- Sukumari as Shantha
- Vanitha Krishnachandran as Shalini's Stepsister
- Ravi Menon as Roy
- Sreenath as Unnikrishnan
- Sathyakala

== Soundtrack ==
The music was composed by G. Devarajan and the lyrics were written by M. D. Rajendran.

No.	Song	Singers	Lyrics	Length (m:ss)
1	"Himashaila Saikatha"	P. Madhuri	M. D. Rajendran	
2	"Himashaila Saikatha" (Bit)	K. J. Yesudas	M. D. Rajendran	
3	"Kannukal Kannukal"	P. Jayachandran, Vani Jairam	M. D. Rajendran	
4	"Sundari Nin Thumbu Kettiyitta"	K. J. Yesudas	M. D. Rajendran	
5	"Vanavalli Kudilile" (Bit)	K. J. Yesudas	M. D. Rajendran	
6	"Viraham Vishaadaardra"	K. J. Yesudas	M. D. Rajendran	
