= Oru Katha Oru Nunakkatha =

1986 Indian Malayalam film

Oru Kadha Oru Nunakkadha
- Poster
- Directed by: Mohan
- Written by: Mohan; Sreenivasan (dialogues)
- Screenplay by: Sreenivasan
- Produced by: David Kachappilly; Innocent
- Starring: Mammootty; Nedumudi Venu; Madhavi; Pavithra
- Edited by: Nazeer
- Music by: Johnson
- Production company: Satru Combines
- Distributed by: Satru Combines
- Release date: 16 January 1986
- Country: India
- Language: Malayalam

Oru Kadha Oru Nunakkadha is a 1986 Indian Malayalam-language comedy film, directed by Mohan, starring Mammootty, Nedumudi Venu, Madhavi and Pavithra. The film has a musical score by Johnson.

== Plot ==
The film opens with Appu Nair, a rich man travelling in a luxurious car where, he reaches his office (He is the manager). Appu remembers his past days when he was poor and jobless. Surprisingly, these incidents are just revealed to be a dream seen by Appu who is actually poor and jobless. Appu spends less time with his family and most of the time outside to find a job. Appu has a habit of bragging to gain other's attraction.

One day, he finds a girl in the telephone booth trying to call someone, Appu helps her by giving her a coin. When she gives him back, he rejects it and soon they talk for sometime. The girl introduces herself as Amminikutty "Ammini". Ammini lives in a women's hostel. Appu brags to her that he is a reputed employee in a large industry. Soon, Ammini and Appu becomes friends. Appu keeps bragging and lying.

Things take a turn when Ammini's cousin, Prof. Mohandas, comes to the scene. Mohandas is a poet whom Ammini has feelings for. Appu who is well aware of this realizes that he should act fast by making Ammini fall for him. At the same time, he also plots to make Mohandas fall in love with Ammini's best friend, Malati who is also a fan of Mohandas in which he succeeds. Appu persuades Malati to marry Mohandas. After this, Malati reveals this Ammini much to her dismay. Appu tries to manipulate Ammini against Mohandas. Ammini rebukes Appu in front of the matron and other girls. Mohandas too comes to confront Appu but he escapes. All the girls, the matron and Mohandas make fun of Appu.

In the end, Appu is seen to be walking on a crowded road where he finds another girl in the telephone booth. Appu helps her by giving her a coin (The same way he did to Ammini when he met her for the first time), implying that he will never change. The film ends with the tagline "സൂക്ഷിക്കുക" which means 'Be Careful'.

== Cast ==
- Mammootty as Prof. Mohandas
- Nedumudi Venu as Appu Nair
- Madhavi as Amminikkutty (Voice dubbed by Kottayam Shantha)
- Pavithra as Malathi
- Innocent
- Meena
- Venu Nagavalli
- Sreenivasan

== Soundtrack ==
The music was composed by Johnson with lyrics by M. D. Rajendran.

No.	Song	Singers	Lyrics	Length (m:ss)
1	"Ariyaathe Ariyaathe"	K. S. Chithra	M. D. Rajendran	

== see the film ==
- oru katha oru nunakkatha (malayalam)
