= Lathika =

Indian playback singer

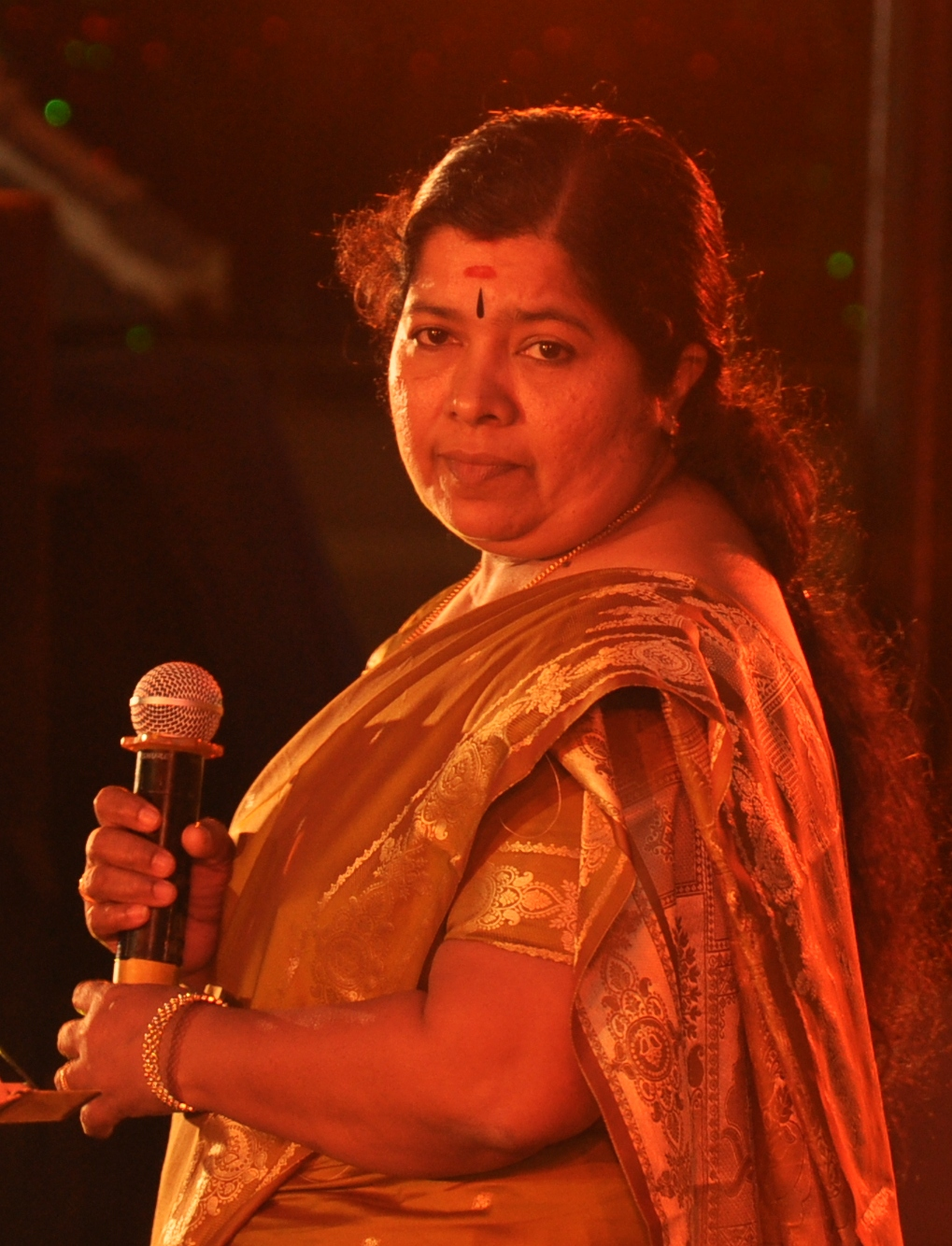

Background information
- Born: Lathika; 12 November 1959 (age 66); Kollam, India
- Genres: Playback singing, Carnatic music
- Occupations: Singer, lecturer
- Instrument: Vocals
- Years active: 1976–present

Lathika is an Indian playback singer. She has mainly worked on Malayalam and Tamil film songs, for over 300 films. Some of her hit songs of that time are ‘Kathodu Kathoram...' and ‘Devadoothar Padi...'(Kathodu Kathoram), ‘Poo Venam Pooppada Venam...' (Oru Minnaminunginte Nurunguvettam), and ‘Tharum Thalirum...' (Chilambu).

== Personal life ==
Lathika is born to Sadasivan Bhagavatham & Nalini in 1959.She is married to G.Rajendran since 1993.

== Career ==
Lathika debuted at the age of 16 with the scene "Pushpathalpathin.." composed by Kannur Rajan for I. V. Sasi's ‘Abhinandam' (1976). She sang the duet with K. J. Yesudas, who, she says, has always been her mentor. Over the years Lathika also has had the "good fortune" to sing in the debut films of some of the most famous composers in Malayalam including Ravindran Master (‘Choola'), Ouseppachan (‘Kathodu Kathoram') and S.P. Venkatesh (‘Rajavinte Makan'). Although Lathika, had earlier sung playback for a number of songs and was a star on the ganamela circuit in and around Kollam and Tamil Nadu, it wasn't until she was introduced to Bharathan that she began to be noticed in the music industry.

It was music director Raveendran, who introduced her to film director Bharathan. She sang the song ‘Varnangal Gandhangal...' in his ‘Chamaram' (1980), for which Raveendran Master composed this one song [the others were composed by M. G. Radhakrishnan. Then her turn came for the music production of ‘Ithiri Poove Chuvanna Poove' (1984) when they needed a female artist to hum a pallavi. In those days S. Janaki was the reigning melody queen and such a senior artist couldn't be brought in only to hum a few lines. That's when Raveendran suggested her name. She was called for an audition and Bharathan liked her voice so much that he gave her the song ‘Pon Pularoli...' to sing. From that time onwards, Bharathan ensured that Lathika got to sing in almost all his films, such as ‘Dum Dum Dum Dhundhubinatham...' (Vaishali) and ‘Hridayaraga...' (Amaram), to name a few. Her last song for him was ‘Othiri Othiri Mohangal...' in Vengalam. Nilaavinte poomgavil... from the movie 'Sreekrishna Parunthu' is one of her most popular song. Her other notable songs include 'Poovulla Meda Kaanan....' from the film 'Pandu pandoru rajakumari' along with G. Venugopal, Aathma Sugandham from the movie 'Bhadrachitta' etc.

Throughout her career, Lathika has had several songs credited to other singers, especially K.S. Chitra, by popular media and persons. This has been attributed to slight similarities between her songs and Chithra's. The singer has always been uncomplaining about the matter.

As of August 2016, her latest rendition for a movie is for a 2016 Malayalam movie Guppy in which she sang the song "Athiraliyum karakaviyum" along with Vijay Yesudas.

In 2022, she received the Kerala Sangeetha Nataka Akademi Award in Light Music category.

== Present Life ==
Lathika worked as lecturer in music at the Swathi Thirunal College of Music, Thiruvananthapuram till her retirement in 2015.
