= Thuramukham =

1979 film directed by Jeassy

- Theatrical release poster
- Directed by: Jeassy
- Screenplay by: Alleppey Sheriff
- Story by: Sherly
- Produced by: J. J. Kuttikkad
- Starring: Soman; Sukumaran; Ambika
- Cinematography: Vipin Das
- Edited by: G. Venkittaraman
- Music by: M. K. Arjunan
- Production company: JJ Productions
- Distributed by: Angel Films
- Release date: 25 December 1979
- Country: India
- Language: Malayalam

Thuramukham (transl. Harbour) is a 1979 Indian Malayalam-language drama film directed by Jeassy and written by Alleppey Sheriff from a story by Sherly. The film stars Soman, Sukumaran and Ambika in the lead roles. It is produced by J. J. Kuttikkad and features a musical score by M. K. Arjunan.

== Plot ==
The story is set in the port city of Cochin, where the lives of several people are intertwined. Kochuthresia is a prostitute who services foreign ship captains, and she lives for her daughter, Rosie. Her husband has died, and she has no other means of earning a livelihood. Rosario Sayipu, an Anglo-Indian officer on a ship, brings Kochuthresia to the attention of ship captains. Peter, Rosario's son, is a fisherman who owns a boat and is deeply in love with Rosie. However, he is also involved with other Anglo-Indian women. Hamza lives by selling smuggled goods from ships and is in love with Rosie, but she only has eyes for Peter.

Rosario discovers Peter and Rosie's relationship and is against it. Despite his father's objections, Peter continues to see Rosie. In a desperate attempt to stop the relationship, Rosario tries to rape Rosie, but she is saved by Hamza. Peter decides to marry Rosie against his father's advice. However, Rosie discovers that Peter has other relationships, and she decides to end their relationship and become close to Hamza.

Then the Christmas nativity song 'Shantharathri Thirurathri' plays.

This makes Peter envious, and he threatens to kill Hamza and Rosie. The marriage between Hamza and Rosie is fixed, but a day before the wedding, Peter takes Rosie to his boat and attempts to rape her. Hamza comes to her rescue, and a fight ensues between him and Peter. During the altercation, Peter stabs Hamza and throws him into the sea. The film ends with Rosie mourning Hamza's death.

== Cast ==
- Soman as Hamza
- Sukumaran as Peter
- Ambika as Rosie
- Sukumari as Kochuthresia
- Jose Prakash as Rosario Sayipu
- Sankaradi as Vasu Mesthiri
- Alummoodan as Kochuthresia's brother
- Kuthiravattam Pappu as Pappi
- Adoor Bhasi as Asan
- Meena as Pankajakshi

== Soundtrack ==
The music was composed by M. K. Arjunan and the lyrics were written by Poovachal Khader.

No.	Song	Singers	Lyrics
1	"Alakal Agnithirakal"	Ambili	Poovachal Khader
2	"Enaakshiyaarival" (Bit)	Adoor Bhasi	
3	"Ikkaanunna Kettitadhil" (Bit)	Adoor Bhasi	
4	"Kochu Kochoru Kochi"	P. Jayachandran, C. O. Anto	Poovachal Khader
5	"Oru Premalekhanam"	Vani Jairam	Poovachal Khader
6	"Raavininnoru Penninte"	K. J. Yesudas	Poovachal Khader
7	"Shaantharaathri Thiruraathri"	Chorus, Jolly Abraham	Poovachal Khader
