= M. G. Soman =

Indian Malayalam actor

- Born: M. G. Somashekharan Nair; 28 October 1941; Thirumoolapuram, Thiruvalla, Kerala
- Died: 12 December 1997 (aged 56); Kochi, Kerala, India
- Years active: 1973−1997
- Spouse: Sujatha (m. 1968-1997)
- Children: 2
- Parent(s): K. N. Govinda Panicker; P. K. Bhavani Amma
- Military career
- Allegiance: India
- Branch: Indian Air Force

M. G. Somashekharan Nair (28 October 1941 – 12 December 1997), professionally credited by his stage name M. G. Soman was an Indian actor and former Indian Air Force officer who appeared in Malayalam films. He was among the actors who played leading roles in Malayalam cinema during the late 1970s and early 1980s. He also had some Tamil films to his credit, including Aval Oru Thodar Kathai. However, in the late 1980s and 1990s, he switched to character and villainous roles.

== Early life ==
He was born as Somashekharan Nair to Konni Kudukkillethu Veettil Govinda Panicker and P. K. Bhavani Amma, in Thiruvalla, Travancore, on 28 September 1941. He had his primary education from Balikamadom H. S. S., Thiruvalla, St. Thomas HSS Thirumoolapuram. While studying in seventh grade, he started a drama troupe with his friend and performed the drama Manaltharikal Garjikkunnu. He did his pre-university degree at St. Berchmans College, Changanassery. He was also part of the Indian Air Force.

== Film career ==
Soman joined Kottarakkara Sreedharan Nair's drama troupe Jayasree and then moved to the film industry. He worked at Kerala Arts Theaters and KPAC. Ramarajyam of Kerala Arts Theaters opened him a way to the movie industry. His first film was Gayatri directed by P. N. Menon in 1973. He acted in the role of a hero from 1976 to 1983 and later played the roles of villains, comedians and supporting roles. In 1977, his best known film was released under the direction of I. V. Sasi – Itha Ivide Vare. He soon rose to become the busiest actor in the industry. In 1978, Soman had acted in 44 films, which were kept as a record till today. After 1984, he had shifted from heroic roles to character roles, notably in films like Poochakkoru Mookkuthi. In 1997, Lelam, directed by Joshiy, was his last film, and his performance as Aanakkattil Eappachan was greatly appreciated and received critical acclaim. He died on 12 December 1997 due to jaundice. He was 56. He produced a Malayalam movie titled Bhoomika in 1991, which was directed by I.V. Sasi, starring Jayaram, Suresh Gopi, Mukesh and Urvashi in lead roles.

== Personal life ==
Soman was married to Sujatha. They have a son Saji and a daughter Sindhu. Saji is married to Bindu and has a son Shekhar and a daughter Shivanghe. Sindhu Soman is married to Girish and has two daughters, Lekshmi Girish and Gayatri Girish.

== Awards ==
Kerala State Film Awards:

- Best Actor (1976) – Thanal, Pallavi
- Second Best Actor (1975) – Swapnadanam, Chuvanna Sandhyakal

== Filmography ==
=== Malayalam ===
==== 1970s ====
| Year | Title | Role | Notes |
|---|---|---|---|
| 1973 | Gayathri | Rajamany | |
| 1973 | Mazhakaaru | Gopi | |
| 1973 | Madhavikutty | | |
| 1973 | Chukku | | |
| 1974 | Jeevikkan Marannupoya Sthree | Balan | |
| 1974 | Pancha Thanthram | Prince in the dance drama | |
| 1974 | Chattakari | Richard | |
| 1974 | Rajahamsam | Nanukuttan | |
| 1974 | Manyasree Viswamithran | Ramesh | |
| 1974 | Thacholi Marumakan Chandu | | |
| 1975 | Utsavam | Bhargavan | |
| 1975 | Picnic | Chudala Muthu | |
| 1975 | Chattambikkalyaani | Kochu Thampuran | |
| 1975 | Pulivalu | | |
| 1975 | Makkal | | |
| 1975 | Ullasa Yaathra | | |
| 1975 | Mattoru Seetha | | |
| 1975 | Odakkuzhal | | |
| 1975 | Bhaaryaye Aavashyamundu | | |
| 1975 | Raasaleela | | |
| 1975 | Dharmakshetre Kurukshetre | | |
| 1975 | Thiruvonam | Padmakumar | |
| 1975 | Mucheettukalikkarante Makal | Priest | |
| 1975 | Sooryavamsham | | |
| 1975 | Tourist Bungalow | | |
| 1975 | Chuvanna Sandhyakal | | |
| 1975 | Abhimaanam | Venugopal | |
| 1975 | Malsaram | | |
| 1976 | Anubhavam | Bosco | |
| 1976 | Ayalkkaari | Suku | |
| 1976 | Sindhooram | | |
| 1976 | Rajaankanam | | |
| 1976 | Kaayamkulam Kochunniyude Makan | | |
| 1976 | Amrithavaahini | Sudhakaran | |
| 1976 | Madhuram Thirumadhuram | Bhaskaran | |
| 1976 | Agni Pushpam | | |
| 1976 | Swapnadanam | Mohan | |
| 1976 | Paalkkadal | Narendran | |
| 1976 | Kuttavum Shikshayum | | |
| 1976 | Seemantha Puthran | | |
| 1976 | Abhinandanam | Sreedharan | |
| 1976 | Missi | | |
| 1976 | Romeo | | |
| 1976 | Swimming Pool | | |
| 1976 | Vazhivilakku | | |
| 1976 | Ponni | Chellan | |
| 1976 | Pick Pocket | Damu | |
| 1976 | Samasya | | |
| 1976 | Surveykkallu | | |
| 1976 | Aruthu | | |
| 1976 | Mohiniyaattam | Venu | |
| 1976 | Chennaaya Valarthiya Kutty | | |
| 1976 | Pushpasharam | | |
| 1976 | Pallavi | | |
| 1977 | Guruvayoor Kesavan | Unni | |
| 1977 | Innale Innu | Thulasi's husband | |
| 1977 | Oonjaal | Rajan | |
| 1977 | Sankhupushpam | Gopi | |
| 1977 | Abhinivesham | Venu | |
| 1977 | Muttathe Mulla | Babu | |
| 1977 | Randu Lokam | Balan | |
| 1977 | Ormakal Marikkumo | Dr. Aravindan | |
| 1977 | Itha Ivide Vare | Vishwanathan | |
| 1977 | Ammaayi Amma | | |
| 1977 | Siva Thandavum | | |
| 1977 | Ivan Ente Priya Putran | | |
| 1977 | Chakravarthini | | |
| 1977 | Sreedevi | Chandrasekharan | |
| 1977 | Vishukkani | Radhakrishnan | |
| 1977 | Akale Aakaasham | | |
| 1977 | Saritha | | |
| 1977 | Anjali | | |
| 1977 | Lakshmi | Rajan | |
| 1977 | Sneha Yamuna | | |
| 1977 | Agninakshathram | | |
| 1977 | Aparaajitha | | |
| 1977 | Veedu Oru Swargam | | |
| 1977 | Anthardaaham | | |
| 1977 | Sujatha | | |
| 1977 | Harshabashpam | | |
| 1977 | Makam Piranna Manka | | |
| 1977 | Muhoorthangal | | |
| 1977 | Sooryakanthi | | |
| 1977 | Tholkan Enikku Manassilla | | |
| 1977 | Aasheervaadam | | |
| 1977 | Panchamrutham | | |
| 1977 | Swarnamedal | | |
| 1977 | Vezhambal | | |
| 1978 | Mannu | Damu | |
| 1978 | Aval Viswasthayayirunnu | James | |
| 1978 | Aniyara | | |
| 1978 | Rathinirvedam | Krishnan Nair | |
| 1978 | Mattoru Karnan | | |
| 1978 | Avalude Ravukal | Chandran | |
| 1978 | Padmatheertham | Karunan | |
| 1978 | Lisa | Lakshmi's boss | |
| 1978 | Kalpavriksham | Surendran | |
| 1978 | Nivedyam | Dr.Gopakumar | |
| 1978 | Nakshatrangale Kaval | | |
| 1978 | Iniyum Puzhayozhukum | Prabhakaran | |
| 1978 | Eeta | Gopalan | |
| 1978 | Kaathirunna Nimisham | Gopi | |
| 1978 | Avalku Maranamilla | | |
| 1978 | Mukkuvane Snehicha Bhootham | Rajan | |
| 1978 | Maattoly | Raghu | |
| 1978 | Velluvili | Soman | |
| 1978 | Thanal | | |
| 1978 | Aarum Anyaralla | Prabhakaran | |
| 1978 | Priyadarshini | | |
| 1978 | Vadakakku Oru Hridayam | | |
| 1978 | Snehikkan Oru Pennu | | |
| 1978 | Rajan Paranja Kadha | | |
| 1978 | Premashilpi | Soman | |
| 1978 | Hemantharaathri | | |
| 1978 | Avakaasham | | |
| 1978 | Rappadikalude Gatha | | |
| 1978 | Njaan Njaan Maathram | | |
| 1978 | Sathrathil Oru Raathri | | |
| 1978 | Mattoru Karnan | | |
| 1978 | Naalumanippookkal | | |
| 1978 | Astamudikayal | | |
| 1978 | Nakshathrangale Kaaval | | |
| 1978 | Anumodhanam | | |
| 1978 | Padmatheertham | Karunan | |
| 1978 | Anubhoothikalude Nimisham | | |
| 1978 | Orkkuka Vallappozhum | | |
| 1978 | Adimakkachavadam | Vasu | |
| 1978 | Ashokavanam | | |
| 1978 | Theerangal | | |
| 1978 | Randu Janmam | | |
| 1978 | Jayikkaanaay Janichavan | Vasu | |
| 1978 | Vishwaroopam | | |
| 1979 | Sayoojyam | Balan | |
| 1979 | Edavazhiyile Poocha Minda Poocha | Bhagyanath | |
| 1979 | Itha Oru Theeram | Gopi | |
| 1979 | Vellayani Paramu | Ithikkara Pakki | |
| 1979 | Chuvanna Chirakukal | Johnny Issac | |
| 1979 | Rakthamillatha Manushyan | Sivan | |
| 1979 | Manasa Vacha Karmana | Dr. Venugopal | |
| 1979 | Prabhaathasandhya | Gopi | |
| 1979 | Ezhamkadalinakkare | Soman | |
| 1979 | Jeevitham Oru Gaanam | Johny | |
| 1979 | Ivide Kattinu Sugandam | Gopi | |
| 1979 | Neeyo Njaano | Damu | |
| 1979 | Choola | | |
| 1979 | Nitya Vasantham | Balan | |
| 1979 | Yakshi Paaru | Rajan | |
| 1979 | Pratheeksha | Balan | |
| 1979 | Anubhavangale Nanni | | |
| 1979 | Pathivritha | | |
| 1979 | Lovely | | |
| 1979 | Amrithachumbanam | | |
| 1979 | Thuramukham | Hamza | |

==== 1980s ====
| Year | Title | Role | Notes |
|---|---|---|---|
| 1980 | Chandra Bimbam | | |
| 1980 | Kadalkkaattu | Sreedharan | |
| 1980 | Muthuchippikal | Sasi | |
| 1980 | Aniyaatha Valakal | Balan | |
| 1980 | Prakadanam | Jose | |
| 1980 | Pralayam | Shivan Kutti | |
| 1980 | Aagamanam | Venu | |
| 1980 | Raagam Thaanam Pallavi | Jayachandran | |
| 1980 | Pavizha Mutthu | Raveendran | |
| 1980 | Dooram Arike | Venu/Fr. Michael | |
| 1980 | Puzha | | |
| 1980 | Oru Varsham Oru Maasam | | |
| 1980 | Thirayum Theeravum | Mohan | |
| 1980 | Pappu | | |
| 1980 | Akalangalil Abhayam | Balachandran | |
| 1980 | Ithile Vannavar | Gopinath | |
| 1980 | Ivar | Leslie | |
| 1980 | Hridhayam Paadunnu | | |
| 1980 | Daaliya Pookkal | | |
| 1980 | Saraswathi Yaamam | Ramankutty | |
| 1980 | Eden Thottam | Thomaskutty | |
| 1980 | Avan Oru Ahankaari | | |
| 1981 | Vayal | Govindankutty | |
| 1981 | Agni Yudham | | |
| 1981 | Sphodanam | Surendran | |
| 1981 | Paathira Sooryan | Stephen | |
| 1981 | Kodumudikal | Bava | |
| 1981 | Kadathu | Ravi | |
| 1981 | Thaaraavu | Narayanankutty | |
| 1981 | Swarangal Swapnagal | Prabhakaran | |
| 1981 | Kolilakkam | Kumar | |
| 1981 | Kathayariyathe | Vishwanatha Menon | |
| 1981 | Raktham | Dr. Venu | |
| 1981 | Itha Oru Dhikkari | Raju | |
| 1981 | Sahasam | | |
| 1981 | Manassinte Theerthayathra | Aravindan | |
| 1981 | Enne Snehikkoo Enne Maathram | | |
| 1981 | Vadaka Veetile Athithi | | |
| 1981 | Ithihasam | | |
| 1981 | Sambhavam | | |
| 1981 | Visham | SI Madhu | |
| 1981 | Veliyattam | Vishwam | |
| 1981 | Vazhikal Yatrakkar | | |
| 1981 | Sreeman Sreemathi | | |
| 1982 | Ethiraalikal | Antony | |
| 1982 | Beedi Kunjamma | Madhavan | |
| 1982 | Oru Vilippadakale | Major Unnikrishnan | |
| 1982 | Raktha Sakshi | | |
| 1982 | Thuranna Jail | Rajan | |
| 1982 | Karthavyam | Sreekumar | |
| 1982 | Sooryan | Venu | |
| 1982 | Sree Ayyappanum Vavarum | Raja Rajasekhara | |
| 1982 | Koritharicha Naal | Vijayan | |
| 1982 | Aarambham | Basheer | |
| 1982 | Preeyasakhi Radha | | |
| 1982 | Dhrohi | | |
| 1982 | Aayudham | Inspector Williams | |
| 1982 | Ivan Oru Simham | Peter | |
| 1982 | Aadharsam | Mohan | |
| 1982 | Dheera | Mohan | |
| 1982 | Shaari Alla Shaarada | Venu | |
| 1983 | Pinnilavu | Dr. Gopi | |
| 1983 | Rathilayam | Somen Thiruvalla | |
| 1983 | Mahabali | Naradan | |
| 1983 | Aa Raathri | All Kerala Abdu | |
| 1983 | Aattakalasam | C.I Vijayan | Cameo |
| 1983 | Ee Yugam | | |
| 1983 | Aadyathe Anuraagam | Jayan | |
| 1983 | Kaathirunna Divasam | Ravi | |
| 1983 | Sandhya Vandanam | Sasi | |
| 1983 | Aana | Manthi Raju | |
| 1983 | Thaavalam | Balan | |
| 1983 | Deepaaradhana | Damu | |
| 1983 | Nathi Muthal Nathi Vare | Hamsa | |
| 1983 | Ahangaaram | Vinod | |
| 1983 | Kolakomban | Khalid | |
| 1983 | Pourasham | Gopi | |
| 1983 | Kathi | | |
| 1983 | Aadyathe Anuraagam | Jayan | |
| 1984 | Poochakkoru Mookkuthi | Hari | |
| 1984 | Koottinilamkili | Balachandran | |
| 1984 | Chakkarayumma | Sayed Muhammed | |
| 1984 | Kodathy | Venu | |
| 1984 | Thacholi Thankappan | Khader | |
| 1984 | Nishedhi | Rajasekharan | |
| 1984 | Minimol Vathicanil | Doctor | |
| 1984 | Kadamattachan | Pulimoottil Kariya | |
| 1984 | Krishna Guruvayoorappa | Villumangalam Swami | |
| 1984 | Arante Mulla Kochu Mulla | Panchayath President | |
| 1984 | Poomadhathe Pennu | Somashekharan | |
| 1984 | Oru Thettinte Katha | | |
| 1984 | Aayiram Abilashangal | | |
| 1984 | Ente Gramam | | |
| 1984 | Idavelakku Sesham | Vinodh | |
| 1984 | Aagraham | | |
| 1984 | Sreekrishna Parunthu | Shekharan Thampi | |
| 1985 | Boeing Boeing | Lambodharan Pillai | |
| 1985 | Vasantha Sena | Sidhartha Menon | |
| 1985 | Aanakkorumma | Police officer | |
| 1985 | Uyarum Njan Nadake | Master | |
| 1985 | Premalekhanam | Kesavan Nair | |
| 1985 | Pathamudayam | B. G. Menon | |
| 1985 | Mulamoottil Adima | Moideen | Special Appearance |
| 1985 | Koodum Thedi | Menon | |
| 1985 | Njan Piranna Nattil | Gopinath | |
| 1985 | Adhyayam Onnu Muthal | Narayanan | |
| 1985 | Aa Neram Alppa Dooram | Sudhakaran | |
| 1985 | Vannu Kandu Keezhadakki | Mangalath Viswanatha Menon | |
| 1985 | Orikkal Oridathu | Raghavan | |
| 1985 | Snehicha Kuttathinu | Sudhakaran | |
| 1985 | Aazhi | | |
| 1985 | Gaayathridevi Ente Amma | Mr. Menon | |
| 1985 | Avidathe Pole Ivideyum | Ravi | |
| 1985 | Iniyum Kadha Thudarum | Krishnan | |
| 1985 | Onathumbikkoru Oonjal | | |
| 1986 | Thalavattam | Dr. Raviandran | |
| 1986 | Sayam Sandhya | Sivaprasad's Brother | |
| 1986 | Panchagni | Mohandas | |
| 1986 | Kunjattakilikal | Vishwanatha Menon | |
| 1986 | Sunil Vayassu 20 | Somashekharan | |
| 1986 | Sukhamo Devi | Dr. Ambikadmajan Nair | |
| 1986 | Sanmanassullavarkku Samadhanam | Rajendran's Uncle | |
| 1986 | Iniyum Kurukshetrum | Jayamohan | |
| 1986 | Adukkan Entheluppam | Williams | |
| 1986 | Nandi Veendum Varika | Ananthan Nair | |
| 1986 | Veendum | Alex | |
| 1986 | Ambadi Thannilorunni | M G Menon | |
| 1986 | Ithramathram | Colonel Rajasekharan | |
| 1986 | Amme Bhagavathi | | |
| 1986 | Malarum Kiliyum | | |
| 1986 | Cabaret Dancer | | |
| 1986 | Nilaavinte Naattil | Venu | |
| 1987 | Ivide Ellavarkkum Sukham | Major Shekhara Varma | |
| 1987 | Vazhiyorakazchakal | Ravi | |
| 1987 | Vrutham | Charlie | |
| 1987 | Vilambaram | Balagopalan | |
| 1987 | Thoovanathumbikal | Mathew Joseph | Cameo |
| 1987 | January Oru Orma | Menon | |
| 1987 | Jaalakam | Appu's Father | |
| 1987 | Cheppu | Principal Sathyadas | |
| 1987 | Kathakku Pinnil | Palodan | |
| 1987 | Rithubhedam | Receiver | |
| 1987 | Nadodikkattu | Himself | Cameo |
| 1987 | Idanazhiyil Oru Kaalocha | Prem Sankar | |
| 1987 | Yagagni | Nambeesan | |
| 1987 | Manivathoorile Aayiram Sivarathrikal | John Samuel | |
| 1987 | Mangalya Charthu | Thomas | |
| 1988 | 1921 | Shekharan Varma | |
| 1988 | Chithram | Jail Superintendent Sathyanathan | |
| 1988 | Aryan | Arumukhan | |
| 1988 | Manu Uncle | DySP | |
| 1988 | Janmandharam | Panikkar | |
| 1988 | Daisy | Balakrishna Menon | |
| 1988 | Aparan | Mohandas, M.D | |
| 1988 | Onninu Purake Mattonnu | Reghu | |
| 1988 | Abkari | Kunjappan | |
| 1988 | Mukthi | Hameed | |
| 1988 | Moonnam Pakkam | Kurup | |
| 1988 | Oru Muthassi Katha | Mayinkutty | |
| 1988 | Vellanakalude Nadu | Prabhakaran | |
| 1988 | Mukunthetta Sumitra Vilikkunnu | C.P. Menon | |
| 1988 | Varnam | Manu's Brother | |
| 1988 | Puthiya Karukkal | Udaya Varma | |
| 1989 | Douthyam | Col. Madhavan Nair | |
| 1989 | Vandanam | Commissioner Chandrasekharan | |
| 1989 | Aavanikunnile Kinnaripookkal | Jayamohan | Photo Appearance |
| 1989 | Crime Branch | Pushkaran | |
| 1989 | Jaithra Yathra | V P Menon | |

==== 1990s ====
| Year | Title | Role | Notes |
|---|---|---|---|
| 1990 | No.20 Madras Mail | R.K. Nair | |
| 1990 | Varthamana Kalam | Ravunni Mashu | |
| 1990 | Aye Auto | Police Commissioner | |
| 1990 | Akkare Akkare Akkare | Police Commissioner | |
| 1990 | Randam Varavu | R. Sreedharan Nair | |
| 1990 | Rajavazhcha | Kuttan Nair | |
| 1990 | Mukham | Home Minister | |
| 1990 | His Highness Abdullah | Kesava Pillai | |
| 1990 | Arhatha | Chandrashekharan Nair | |
| 1990 | Appu | Police Officer | |
| 1990 | Midhya | Appunni | |
| 1990 | Ee Thanutha Veluppan Kalathu | Kuwait Mani | |
| 1991 | Adhwaytham | Shekharan | |
| 1991 | Inspector Balram | Sahadevan | |
| 1991 | Neelagiri | Shekhara Menon | |
| 1991 | Ulladakkam | Mathachan | |
| 1991 | Njan Gandharvan | Gopalakrishnan Nair | |
| 1991 | Ente Sooryaputhrikku | Vinod Shankar | |
| 1991 | Bhoomika | Raghavan Nair | |
| 1991 | Mahazar | Adv. Venugopal | |
| 1992 | Thalastaanam | Raghavan | |
| 1992 | Aardram | Jail Warden | |
| 1992 | Apaaratha | Singapore Pillai | |
| 1992 | Mahanagaram | Kumaran Master | |
| 1992 | Congratulations Miss Anitha Menon | Shankara Menon | |
| 1992 | Kallanum Polisum | SP | |
| 1993 | Mafia | Deputy City Police Commissioner M.T. Govindan | |
| 1993 | Arthana | Madhavan Nair | |
| 1994 | Kabooliwala | Munna's Father | |
| 1994 | Commissioner | IG Balachandran Nair IPS | |
| 1994 | Pakshe | Shivadasa Menon IAS | |
| 1994 | Gentleman Security | Unnithan | |
| 1994 | Chukkan | Parol Padmanabhan | |
| 1995 | Rajakeeyam | Bharatha Varman | |
| 1995 | Nirnayam | Dr. David Kurishinkal | |
| 1995 | Kaattile Thadi Thevarude Ana | Chief Minister | |
| 1995 | The King | Alexander Thevalliparambil | Cameo |
| 1995 | Sundarimare Sookshikkuka | C.P. Raveendran | |
| 1996 | Indraprastham | K. N. Nair | |
| 1996 | Rajaputhran | Vishwanathan | |
| 1996 | Hitler | College Professor | |
| 1996 | Sugavaasam | Ganapathi Iyyer | |
| 1997 | Oru Yathramozhi | Santhosh | |
| 1997 | Chandralekha | Dr. Menon | |
| 1997 | Varnapakittu | Kuruvilla | |
| 1997 | Lelam | Aanakkaattil Eappachan | Final film |

=== Tamil films ===
| Year | Title | Role |
|---|---|---|
| 1974 | Aval Oru Thodar Kathai | Chandrasekhar |
| 1975 | Naalai Namadhe | Ravi |
| 1976 | Kumara Vijayam | Vinoth |
| 1993 | Airport | Senior minister Krishnamoorthy |

== Television ==
- Kuthirakal (Doordarshan)
- Sahanam (Doordarshan)
