= Thaaraavu =

- Directed by: Jeassy
- Written by: P. K. Mohan; Kaloor Dennis (dialogues)
- Screenplay by: Jeassy
- Produced by: N. Premkumar; N. K. Ramachandran
- Starring: Madhu; Srividya; Sankaradi; Shubha
- Cinematography: C. Ramachandra Menon
- Edited by: G. Venkittaraman
- Music by: K. J. Yesudas
- Production company: Divya Creations
- Distributed by: Divya Creations
- Release date: 25 December 1981
- Country: India
- Language: Malayalam

Thaaraavu (transl. Duck) is a 1981 Indian Malayalam film, directed by Jeassy and produced by N. Premkumar and N. K. Ramachandran. The film stars Madhu, Srividya, Sankaradi and Shubha in the lead roles. The film has musical score by K. J. Yesudas.

== Cast ==
- Madhu
- Srividya
- Sankaradi
- Sukumari
- Shubha
- Ambika
- M. G. Soman
- Mala Aravindan
- Master Rajakumaran Thampi

== Soundtrack ==
The music was composed by K. J. Yesudas and the lyrics were written by O. N. V. Kurup.

No.	Song	Singers	Lyrics	Length (m:ss)
1	"Oduvil Neeyum"	K. J. Yesudas	O. N. V. Kurup	
2	"Ottakaalil Thapassu Cheyyum"	Sujatha Mohan, C. O. Anto, Kalyani Menon	O. N. V. Kurup	
3	"Thaazhampookkuda"	K. J. Yesudas, Sujatha Mohan, Chorus	O. N. V. Kurup	
4	"Thakkidamundan Thaarave"	K. J. Yesudas, Chorus, K. S. Beena	O. N. V. Kurup	
