= Dooram Arike =

1980 film directed by Jeassy

- Directed by: Jeassy
- Written by: Sherif
- Produced by: O. M. John
- Starring: M. G. Soman; Sukumaran; Srividya; Ambika; K. P. Ummer
- Cinematography: Vipin Das
- Edited by: K. Narayanan
- Music by: Ilaiyaraaja
- Production company: St. Joseph Cine Arts
- Distributed by: St. Joseph Cine Arts
- Release date: 29 February 1980
- Running time: 130 minutes
- Language: Malayalam

Dooram Arike is a 1980 Indian Malayalam-language film, directed by Jeassy and produced by O. M. John. The film stars Sukumari, Srividya, Sankaradi and Sukumaran . The film has musical score and songs composed by Ilaiyaraaja.

== Plot ==
Dooram Arike is an emotional family film of love and sacrifice.

== Cast ==
- M. G. Soman as Venu/Father Michael
- Sukumaran as James
- Srividya as Gouri
- Ambika as Shirley
- K. P. Ummer as Shirley's father
- Sankaradi as Mani Iyyar
- Sukumari as Alamelu
- Bahadoor as Ramunni
- Kuthiravattom Pappu as Varkey
- Alummoodan aa Vasu
- KPAC Lalitha as Santhamma
- Suchitra as Elizabeth

== Soundtrack ==
The music was composed by Ilaiyaraaja and the lyrics were written by O. N. V. Kurup.

| No. | Song | Singers | Lyrics | Length (m:ss) |
|---|---|---|---|---|
| 1 | "Arike Arike" | K. J. Yesudas | O. N. V. Kurup | |
| 2 | "Maankidaave Nin Nenchum" | P. Jayachandran | O. N. V. Kurup | |
| 3 | "Malarthoppithil Kilikkonchalaay" | K. J. Yesudas, Chorus | O. N. V. Kurup | |
| 4 | "Paalaruvi Paadivaru" | S. Janaki | O. N. V. Kurup | |
