= Ezhu Rathrikal =

- Directed by: Ramu Kariat
- Written by: Kaladi Gopi
- Screenplay by: Kaladi Gopi
- Produced by: Babu Sait
- Starring: Latha Raju; Jesey; Alummoodan; Chachappan
- Cinematography: Kamal Bose
- Edited by: K. D. George
- Music by: Salil Chowdhury; Shantha P. Nair (One song)
- Production company: Kanmani Films
- Distributed by: Kanmani Films
- Release date: 30 August 1968
- Country: India
- Language: Malayalam

Ezhu Raathrikal is a Malayalam language Indian movie directed by Ramu Kariat.

== Cast ==
- Latha Raju
- Jesey
- Alummoodan
- Chachappan
- Kaduvakulam Antony
- Kamaladevi
- Kedamangalam Ali
- Kuttan Pillai
- Master Pramod
- N. Govindankutty
- Nellikode Bhaskaran

== Soundtrack ==
The songs and background music were composed by Salil Chowdhury. Shantha P. Nair composed the song Makkathu Poyvarum. All song lyrics were written by Vayalar Ramavarma.

No.	Song	Singers	Lyrics	Length (m:ss)
1	"Kaadaarumaasam"	K. J. Yesudas	Vayalar Ramavarma	
2	"Kakkakkarumbikale"	K. J. Yesudas, C. O. Anto, K. P. Udayabhanu, Latha Raju, Sreelatha Namboothiri	Vayalar Ramavarma	
3	"Makkathu Poyvarum"	Latha Raju	Vayalar Ramavarma	
4	"Panchamiyo Pournamiyo"	P. Leela	Vayalar Ramavarma	
5	"Raathri Raathri"	P. B. Sreenivas	Vayalar Ramavarma	
