= Ashwathi =

Ashwathi can refer to:

- Aswathy, 1974 Indian Malayalam-language film
- Ashwathi Pillai (born 2000), Indian-born Swedish badminton player
- Varsha Ashwathi, Indian actress
