= Ethiraalikal =

- Directed by: Jeassy
- Written by: Joseph Madappally
- Produced by: Sainaba Hassan
- Starring: Srividya; Jagathy Sreekumar; Sukumaran; Ambika
- Cinematography: S. Kumar
- Music by: A. T. Ummer
- Production company: Sajina Films
- Distributed by: Sajina Films
- Release date: 2 April 1982
- Country: India
- Language: Malayalam

Ethiraalikal is a 1982 Indian Malayalam-language film directed by Jeassy and produced by Sainaba Hassan. The film stars Srividya, Jagathy Sreekumar, Sukumaran and Ambika in the lead roles. The film has musical score by A. T. Ummer.

== Cast ==
- Srividya as Ammini
- Jagathy Sreekumar as Tube
- Sukumaran as Gopi
- Ambika as Thulasi
- Sukumari as Karthyayani
- Balan K. Nair as Mathai
- Janardanan as Hamsa
- M. G. Soman as Antony
- Mala Aravindan as Pareed
- Sankaradi as Mammukka
- Nellikode Bhaskaran as Madhavan
- P. K. Abraham as Priest
- Baby Vandhana

== Soundtrack ==
The music was composed by A. T. Ummer and the lyrics were written by Chirayinkeezhu Ramakrishnan Nair and Poovachal Khader.

No.	Song	Singers	Lyrics	Length (m:ss)
1	"Chellaanam Karayile"	K. J. Yesudas	Chirayinkeezhu Ramakrishnan Nair	
2	"Mootta Mootta Mootta..." Mootta kudikkunne	P. Jayachandran, C. O. Anto	Poovachal Khader	
3	"Pandu Pandoru"	Sherin Peters	Poovachal Khader	
4	"Venalkkinaavukale"	Vani Jairam	Chirayinkeezhu Ramakrishnan Nair	

== view the film ==
- ETHIRALIKAL Malayalam film
