= Azhimukham =

- Directed by: P. Vijayan
- Written by: P. K. Mathew; Jesey (dialogues)
- Screenplay by: Jesey
- Starring: Jayabharathi; Cochin Haneefa; Bahadoor; K. P. Ummer
- Cinematography: U. Rajagopal
- Edited by: K. Sankunni
- Music by: M. S. Baburaj
- Production company: Creature Arts
- Distributed by: Creature Arts
- Release date: 22 September 1972
- Country: India
- Language: Malayalam

Azhimukham (transl. Estuary) is a 1972 Indian Malayalam film, directed by P. Vijayan. The film stars Jayabharathi, Cochin Haneefa, Bahadoor and K. P. Ummer in the lead roles. The film had musical score by M. S. Baburaj.

== Cast ==
- Jayabharathi
- Cochin Haneefa
- Bahadoor
- K. P. Ummer
- Nellikode Bhaskaran
- Sujatha
- T. K. Balachandran

== Soundtrack ==
The music was composed by M. S. Baburaj and the lyrics were written by Mankombu Gopalakrishnan and Poochakkal Shahul Hameed.

No.	Song	Singers	Lyrics	Length (m:ss)
1	"Arikil Amrithakumbham"	L. R. Eeswari	Mankombu Gopalakrishnan	
2	"Azhimukham Kanikaanum"	M. S. Baburaj	Poochakkal Shahul Hameed	
3	"Kaliyodu Kalikonda"	K. J. Yesudas	Mankombu Gopalakrishnan	
4	"Karukavarambathu"	S. Janaki	Poochakkal Shahul Hameed	
5	"Orila Eerila"	S. Janaki	Mankombu Gopalakrishnan	
6	"Pandupandoru"	C. O. Anto	Poochakkal Shahul Hameed	
