= Aagamanam =

- Directed by: Jeassy
- Written by: P. G. Antony (dialogues)
- Screenplay by: P. G. Antony
- Produced by: G. Sugunan
- Starring: Sukumari; Srividya; M. G. Soman; Ravikumar
- Cinematography: Vipin Das
- Edited by: G. Venkittaraman
- Music by: Vidyadharan
- Production company: Sunitha Arts
- Distributed by: Sunitha Arts
- Release date: 5 December 1980
- Country: India
- Language: Malayalam

Aagamanam is a 1980 Indian Malayalam-language film directed by Jeassy and produced by G. Sugunan. The film stars Sukumari, Srividya, M. G. Soman and Ravikumar in the lead roles. The film has musical score by Vidyadharan.

== Cast ==
- Sukumari as Subhadra Menon
- Srividya as Thulasi
- M. G. Soman as Venu
- Ravikumar as Raghu
- Adoor Bhasi as Samuel
- Jose Prakash as Isaac
- Manavalan Joseph as Padmanabhan
- Sankaradi as Raman Nair
- Ambika as Seetha
- Janardanan as Murali
- K. P. Ummer as Estate Owner
- T. K. Balachandran as Peter
- Sukumaran as Professor George Thomas

== Soundtrack ==
The music was composed by Vidyadharan and the lyrics were written by O. N. V. Kurup.

No.	Song	Singers	Lyrics	Length (m:ss)
1	"Krishnavarna Meni"	S. Janaki	O. N. V. Kurup	
2	"Nandiyaarvattathin"	K. J. Yesudas	O. N. V. Kurup	
3	"Painkilippaithale"	C. O. Anto	O. N. V. Kurup	
4	"Thappu Kotti"	P. Jayachandran, Chorus, Usha Ravi	O. N. V. Kurup	
