= Ambika (actress) =

Indian film and television actress

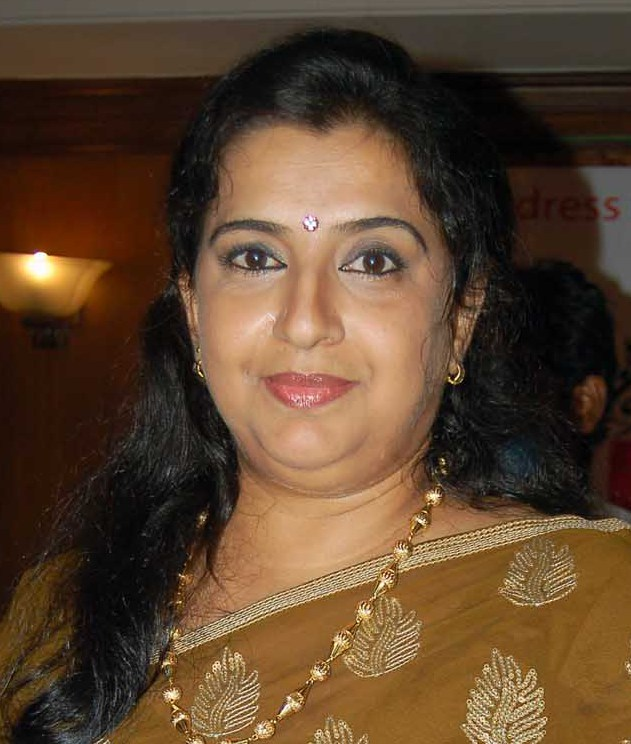
- Ambika in 2014
- Born: Kallara, Thiruvananthapuram, Kerala, India
- Years active: 1976–1989 (as a leading actress); 1997–present (as a supporting artist)
- Spouse: Premkumar (m. 1988; div. 1996)
- Family: Radha (sister)
- Awards: Kalaimaamani (1984)

Ambika is an Indian actress known for her work predominantly across the entire southern film industry and in several tele serials. She has also acted in an English film (Indian-American), to date. She was one of the top South Indian heroines for more than a decade from 1976 to 1989. Her younger sister Radha was also an actress. They acted together in a number of South Indian films during the peak of their career. The sisters runs a movie studio called 'ARS Studios', which they converted into a hotel complex in 2013.

== Personal life ==
Ambika was born to Kallara Kunjan Nair and Sarasamma at Kallara, Thiruvananthapuram. Her mother Kallara Sarasamma was Mahila Congress leader during 2014. She has two younger sisters, Radha and Mallika, and two younger brothers, Arjun and Suresh.

Ambika married an NRI, named Premkumar Menon in 1988. The couple has two sons and was settled in the United States. However, they divorced in 1996. She is currently settled in Chennai with her sons.

in September 2026, she was embroiled in a legal case with her sister Radha.

== Career ==
Ambika started her career as a child artist in Malayalam cinema in 1976 with the film Chottanikkara Amma and later starred as a heroine in more than 200 South Indian films. Her career as a heroine started with the Malayalam movie Seetha, which was released very late in her career. But with films such as Neelathaamara and Lejjavathi, she became a busy actress within a few years not only in Malayalam,

Ambika made her debut in Tamil in 1979 with the film Chakkalathi. Ambika's role as a young girl in K Bhagyaraj's Tamil film Andha 7 Naatkal grabbed the eyeballs of movie buffs. In 1984 she acted in Naan Paadum Paadal directed by Sundarrajan which had Sivakumar, Mohan and Pandiyan in lead roles. Ambika shot to fame with Kaakki Sattai (1985). At the zenith of her career she costarred with her sister Radha in Kadhal Parisu (1987), where both actresses demonstrated their acting prowess in the roles of two sisters, both with strong but conflicting personalities.

In 1986, she acted in the commercially successful Malayalam movie Rajavinte Makan, which starred Mohanlal. It was Ambika who got paid more than Mohanlal in the movie Rajavinte Makan. Ambika was busier and more popular than Mohanlal at that time. She also acted with him the following year in another box office hit Irupatham Noottandu.

The 1980s were the golden era for Ambika, as she acted in over 200 movies in Tamil, Malayalam, Telugu, and Kannada, and most of the films were box office hits. Ambika did many films with the leading actors of her time such as Kamal Haasan, Rajinikanth, Vijayakanth, Sathyaraj,Karthik, Prabhu, Mammootty, Mohanlal, Dileep, Shankar, N. T. Rama Rao, Krishna, Krishnam Raju, Dr. Rajkumar, Ambareesh and Chiranjeevi.

After getting divorced, she returned to India from the U.S. Later in the year 1997, she started acting again in the films Periya Manushan, Simhada Mari, and Maa Nannaku Pelli. She acted in Vikraman's project Mariyadhai (2009), in which Vijayakanth played the double roles of father and son.

She has acted in many advertisements. She is a designer too. She has also judged many reality shows. She has been playing the lead role in the serial Mrs. Hitler aired on Zee Tamil TV, and also made a special appearance in the role of a senior government officer named Vanitha in the serial Anbe Vaa which aired on Sun TV. She made a cameo in the television serial Mangalyam. She also took on the role of judge in the reality show Drama Juniors.

== Filmography ==
In order of languages in which she acted the most to the fewest films.

=== Malayalam ===
Year	Title	Role	Notes
1976	Chottanikkara Amma		child artist
1977	Taxi Driver		child artist
1977	Dheerasameere Yamunaatheere		child artist
1977	Vidarunna Mottukal	Sumam	child artist
1978	Aval Viswasthayaayirunnu		child artist
1978	Samayamaayilla Polum	Latha	
1978	Asthamayam		Guest appearance
1979	Neelathamara	Kunjimalu	
1979	Ajnaatha Theerangal	Geetha	
1979	Lajjaavathi	Radha	
1979	Krishnapparunthu		
1979	Veerabhadran		
1979	Raajaveedhi		
1979	Agniparvatham	Vimala	
1979	Thuramukham	Rosi	
1979	Enikku Njaan Swantham	Geetha	
1979	Neeyo Njaano	Geetha	
1979	Pratheeksha		
1979	Prabhaathasandhya	Mini	
1979	Maamaankam	Manipennu	
1979	Edavazhiyile Poocha Minda Poocha	Shyamala	
1980	Pappu	Herself	
1980	Theeram Thedunnavar		
1980	Seetha	Seetha	
1980	Akalangalil Abhayam	Yamuna	
1980	Theekkadal	Sumam	
1980	Ishtamaanu Pakshe	Nandinikutty	
1980	Aniyaatha Valakal	Sujatha	
1980	Angaadi	Ayisha	
1980	Sathyam	Seetha	
1980	Ithile Vannavar	Bindu	
1980	Kaavalmaadam	Malli	
1980	Ammayum Makalum	Radha	
1980	Meen	Roselin	
1980	Anthappuram	Usha	
1980	Swantham Enna Padam	Priya	
1980	Vaiki Vanna Vasantham	Sheeba	
1980	Aagamanam	Seetha	
1980	Eden Thottam	Usha	
1980	Puzha	-	
1980	Dooram Arike	Shirly	
1981	Anyar		
1981	Chamayam		
1981	Veshangal		
1981	Archana Teacher	Bharathi	
1981	Prema Geethangal	Geetha Kumari	
1981	Asthamikkatha Pakalukal	Raji	
1981	Guha	Devu	
1981	Maniyan Pillai Athava Maniyan Pillai	Kamalam	
1981	Sambhavam	Radha	
1981	Njan Ninne Marakkilla		
1981	Thaaraavu	Akka	
1981	Swarangal Swapnagal	Latha	
1981	Enne Snehikkoo Enne Maathram		
1982	Pooviriyum Pulari	Renuka	
1982	Mylanchi	Shahitha	
1982	Olangal	Rita	
1982	Kelkatha Shabdam	Jayanthi	
1982	Ethiraalikal	Thulasi	
1982	Sharam	Sindhu	
1982	Mukhangal		
1982	Dheera	Indhu	
1982	Anuraagakkodathi	Susheela	
1983	Father Damien		
1983	Kaathirunna Naal		
1983	Eettappuli	Padmavathi	
1983	Theeram Thedunna Thira	Jayalakshmi	
1983	Marakkillorikkalum	Suma	
1983	Nizhal Moodiya Nirangal	Molamma	
1983	Asthi	Priyamvada	
1983	Adyathe Anuragam	Shyamala	
1983	Enikku Vishakunnu	Shantha	
1983	Sandhyakku Virija Poovu	Priya	
1984	Sabarimala Darsanam		
1984	Ente Gramam		
1984	Kalkki		
1984	Oru Sumangaliyude Katha	Yamuna	
1985	Puzhayozhukum Vazhi	Rema	
1985	Oru Nokku Kaanan	Maya	
1985	Agniyasthram		
1985	Iniyum Kadha Thudarum	Mary	
1985	Archana Aaradhana	Archana	
1986	Thidambu	-	
1986	Chekeranoru Chilla	Lathika Menon (Lallu)	
1986	Moonnu Masangalkku Munpu	Nirmala	
1986	Malarum Kiliyum	Thulasi	
1986	Rajavinte Makan	Nancy	
1987	Swathi Thirunal	Narayani Pillai Kochamma	
1987	Ezhuthapurangal	Vimala Jacob	
1987	Vazhiyorakkazhchakal	Sridevi	
1987	Nirabhedangal	Maya	
1987	Vilambaram	Sheela	
1987	Irupatham Noottandu	Aswathy Varma	
1988	Ayitham	Bhama	
1988	Kakkothikkavile Appooppan Thaadikal	Valsala	
1988	Kudumbapuranam	Geetha	
1988	Manasaputhri		
1988	Pattanapravesham	Shobha	
1989	Brahmasthram		
1991	Manju Peyyunna Rathri		
1991	Sayanthanam		
1991	Sheershakam		
1992	Sabarimalayil Thankasooryodayam		
1997	Snehasindooram	Uma	
1999	Niram	Baby	
1999	Udayapuram Sulthan	Malavika	
2000	Varnakkazchchakal	Bhagyalakshmi	
2000	Swayamvara Panthal	Latha	
2000	Sathyam Sivam Sundaram	Nandhini	
2001	Dubai		
2004	Koottu	Savitha Vishwambharan	
2005	Ben Johnson	Pathrose's wife	
2005	Kalyana Kurimanam	Subhadra	
2005	Pandippada	Mallika	
2005	Annorikkal	Karthu	
2006	Arunam		
2007	Hareendran Oru Nishkalankan	Hareendran's mother	
2009	The Trigger		
2009	Vairam: Fight for Justice	Judge	
2009	Kana Kanmani	Doctor	
2009	Angel John	Mary	
2010	Thanthonni	Kathreena	
2010	Sadgamaya	Gauri Sudhakaran	
2011	Naayika	Herself	Archive footage/Uncredited cameo
2011	Ponnu Kondoru Aalroopam	-	
2011	Lavakumar 1984	-	
2012	Yakshi – Faithfully Yours	Vishnu's mother	
2014	Polytechnic	Pauly's mother	
2014	To Noora with Love	Khadeeja	
2014	Aamayum Muyalum	Kadambari	
2015	Mili	Mercey	
2015	She Taxi	Annamma	
2019	Kettyolaanu Ente Malakha	Herself	Archive footage/Uncredited cameo
2019	Mohabbathin Kunjabdulla	Alima	
2022	Sathyam Mathrame Bodhippikkoo	Justice Mary Varghese	
2022	Ullasam	Marykutty	
2022	August 27		
2022	Anjil Oral Thaskaran		
2022	Naja		
2026	Law and Order †	TBA	

=== Tamil ===
Year	Title	Role	Notes
1979	Chakkalathi	Azhagammal	
1980	Tharayil Pootha Malar		
1980	Enga Ooru Rasathi		
1981	Tharayil Vaazhum Meenkal		
1981	Andha 7 Naatkal	Vasanthi	
1981	Kadal Meengal	Uma	
1982	Theerpugal Thiruththapadalam	Radha	
1982	Sagalakala Vallavan	Geetha	
1982	Enkeyo Ketta Kural	Ponni (first wife)	
1982	Vazhvey Maayam	Sandhiya	
1982	Deviyin Thiruvilayadal	Dakshayini	
1982	Idhayam Pesugirathu		
1983	Jothi		
1983	Thoongatha Kannindru Ondru	Devi	
1983	Garuda Saukiyama		
1983	Thalaimagan		
1983	Thambathyam		
1983	Raagangal Maaruvathillai		
1983	Vellai Roja	Lakshmi	
1984	Thiruppam		
1984	Vengaiyin Maindhan		
1984	Tharaasu	Latha	
1984	Thangamadi Thangam		
1984	Naan Paadum Paadal		
1984	Neethikku Oru Penn		
1984	Anbulla Rajinikanth	Mother of Rosy	
1984	Kanmaniye Pesu		
1984	Thaalithanam		
1984	Ambigai Neril Vanthaal		
1984	Pei Veedu		
1984	Pournami Alaigal		
1984	Irumbu Kaigal		
1984	Vaazhkai		
1984	Nerupukkul Eeram		
1985	Naagam	Janaki	
1985	Kaakki Sattai	Uma	
1985	Naan Sigappu Manithan	Uma	
1985	Puthiya Sagaptham	Uma	
1985	Uyarndha Ullam	Geetha	
1985	Engal Kural	Guest appearance	
1985	Aval Potta Kolam		
1985	Sri Raghavendrar	Aparajita	
1985	Idaya Kovil	Gauri	
1985	Arthamulla Aasaigal		
1985	Karuppu Chattaikaran		
1985	Erimalai		
1985	Thandanai		
1985	Puthiya Theerppu	Radha	
1985	Unakkaga Oru Roja	Meera	
1985	Thoongatha Kannondru Ondru		
1985	Padikathavan	Mary	
1986	Mr. Bharath	Uma	
1986	Nermai		
1986	Vikram	Vikram's wife	
1986	Oruvar Vazhum Alayam		
1986	Naanum Oru Thozhilali		
1986	Kanmaniye Pesu		
1986	Karpoora Deepam		
1986	Isai Paadum Thendral		
1986	Manakanakku		
1986	Thazhuvatha Kaigal	Rajeshwari	
1986	Raja Nee Vaazhga		
1986	Rasigan Oru Rasigai		
1986	Maaveeran	Rekha	
1987	Velundu Vinaiyillai		
1987	Muthukkal Moondru		
1987	Chinna Kuyil Paaduthu	Geetha	
1987	Naanum Oru Thozhilali		
1987	Makkal En Pakkam	Radha	
1987	Kadhal Parisu	Malini	
1987	Mupperum Deviyar		
1987	Veeran Veluthambi		
1987	Thambathyam		
1987	Nalla Pambu		
1987	Aalappirandhavan	Seetha IPS	
1987	Ivargal Varungala Thoongal		
1988	Annanagar Mudhal Theru	Geetha	
1988	Rendum Rendum Aindhu		
1988	Ganam Courtar Avargaley		
1988	Kan Simittum Neram	Lakshmi	
1988	Oruvar Vaazhum Aalayam	Sivakami	
1997	Periya Manushan	Sivagami	
1997	Arunachalam	Meenakshi	
1998	Sandhippoma		
1998	Poonthottam		
1998	Unnidathil Ennai Koduthen		
1998	En Uyir Nee Thaane		
1998	Kaadhal Kavidhai	Vishwa's mother	
1999	Uyirodu Uyiraga	Anjali's mother	
1999	Kodiesvaran		
1999	Iraniyan		
1999	Poovellam Kettuppar	Krishna Bharathi's mother	
1999	Anantha Poongathe		
1999	Jodi	Sneha Varadharajan	
1999	Pooparika Varugirom		
1999	Time	Srinivasa Murthy's mother	
1999	Amarkkalam	Mohana's mother	
1999	Suyamvaram	wedding guest	
2000	Simmasanam	Sathyamurthy's wife	
2000	Magalirkkaga	Head Constable Panchavarnam	
2000	Vallarasu	Anjali's mother	
2001	Piriyadha Varam Vendum	Nithi's mother	
2002	Jaya		
2002	Alli Arjuna	Savithri's mother	
2003	Ottran	Sudha's mother	
2004	Image	Kavya	
2004	Super Da		
2005	Jadhi		
2005	Mazhai	Shailaja's mother	
2007	Vel	Vel's adoptive mother	
2009	Mariyadhai	Alamelu Annamalai	
2010	Uthama Puthiran	Sivakaami	
2011	Avan Ivan	Maryamma	
2012	Ullam		
2014	Jigarthanda	Kayalvizhi's mother	
2014	Nerungi Vaa Muthamidathe		
2015	Idhu Enna Maayam	Arun's mother	
2016	Ennama Katha Vudranunga		
2018	Traffic Ramasamy	Judge	
2022	Super Senior Heroes	Mrs. S. / Lady Justice	
2025	Mrs & Mr	Annalakshmi	

=== Kannada ===
Year	Title	Role	Notes
1981	Sri Yediyuru Siddalingeshwara		
1982	Garuda Rekhe		
1982	Chalisuva Modagalu	Sheela	
1983	Avala Neralu	Lakshmi	
1983	Chakravyuha	Asha	
1983	Gayathri Maduve	Gayathri	
1983	Eradu Nakshatragalu		
1983	Bhakta Prahlada		
1983	Hasida Hebbuli		
1984	Naane Raja	Asha	
1984	Mooru Janma	Chitti	
1984	Pralayanthaka		Special appearance
1984	Onde Raktha		
1984	Indina Bharatha	Bharathi	
1984	Apoorva Sangama	Tara	
1985	Chaduranga	Asha	
1986	Asambhava		
1986	Digvijaya	Asha / Radha	Dual roles
1986	Shubha Milana	Ganga	
1986	Bete		
1986	Sathkara		
1987	Bazar Bheema		
1987	Jeevana Jyothi	Radha	
1987	Athiratha Maharatha	Radha	
1987	Poorna Chandra	Kumuda	
1987	Nyayakke Shikshe		
1987	Aapadbandhava		
1988	Dharmathma		
1988	Kirathaka		
1988	Vijaya Khadga	Asha	
1989	Hongkongnalli Agent Amar		
1997	Simhada Mari	Vishwa's mother	
1999	Janumadatha	Ahalya	
2000	Kanasugara	Sangeeta's mother	
2000	Sulthan		
2002	Nagarahavu		
2002	Nandhi	Nandhi's mother	
2002	Manasella Neene	Madhavi	
2003	Vijaysimha		
2004	Om Ganesh		
2017	Kaffi Thota	Judge	
2019	Kalidasa Kannada Meshtru	Principal	

=== Telugu ===
Year	Title	Role	Notes
1981	Addala Meda	Lakshmi	
1981	Viswaroopam	Mallika	
1981	Prema Mandiram	Hema	
1981	Nayudu Gari Abbai	Madhavi	
1981	Bobbili Puli	Jayanthi	
1983	Rajkumar	Devi	
1984	Dongalu Baboi Dongalu	Seetha	
1984	Kurukshetramlo Sita	Janaki	
1984	Mukhyamantri		
1988	Yamudiki Mogudu	Dancer	
1997	Maa Nannaki Pelli	Shravani	
1998	Kodukulu		
1998	Raayudu	Tulasi	
1999	Neti Gandhi		
2002	Kondaveeti Simhasanam		
2002	Police Sisters	Jaya	
2005	Slokam		
2006	Manasu Palike Mouna Raagam		

== Television ==
=== Serials ===
Year	Title	Role	Channel	Language
1998	Kudumbam		Sun TV	Tamil
2002–2003	Agni Pravesam		ETV	Telugu
2003	Summer in America		Kairali TV	Malayalam
2004	Jalam		Surya TV	Malayalam
2004–2005	Koodum Thedi		Asianet	Malayalam
2007–2008	Brindavanam		Gemini TV	Telugu
2011	Kanalpoovu		Jeevan TV	Malayalam
2012	Preethiyinda		Star Suvarna	Kannada
2012	Sreepadmanabham		Amrita TV	Malayalam
2013–2014	Avakashikal	Sujatha	Surya TV	Malayalam
2013–2014	Sare Gama gama gama		Puthuyugam TV	Tamil
2014	Jeevitha Ganam			Malayalam
2017	Aparichitha	Bhairavi	Amrita TV	Malayalam
2018–2020	Nayagi	Sargunam	Sun TV	Tamil
2020	Chithi 2	Sargunam (Special Appearance)	Sun TV	Tamil
2020–2021	Thirumathi Hitler	Jayamma	Zee Tamil	Tamil
2021	Velammal		Star Vijay	Tamil
2021	Anbe Vaa	Janaki (Special Appearance)	Sun TV	Tamil
2021–2024	Aruvi	Saraswathi	Sun TV	Tamil
2022	Padmavati Kalyanam	Bramarambhika Devi	ETV	Telugu
2023	Malar	Saraswathi (Special Appearance in promo)	Sun TV	Tamil
2023	Mangalyam	Herself (Special Appearance)	Zee Keralam	Malayalam
2023–2025	Geeta Govindam	Vijayalakshmi Subramaniam	Asianet	Malayalam
2024–2025	Malli	Pothum Ponnu	Sun TV	Tamil
2024–2025	Drishti Bottu	Abbakka	Colors Kannada	Kannada
2025	Gettimelam	Kamakshi Ammal (Special Appearance)	Zee Tamil	Tamil
2026	Paarijatham	Doctor Mithra (Special Appearance)	Zee Tamil	Tamil

=== Shows ===
Year	Title	Role	Channel	Language
	Suvarna Thaarangal			Tamil
2011	Kerala's Favourite Film Actor	Judge	ACV	Malayalam
2011	Vivel Big Break	Judge	Surya TV	Malayalam
2012	Veruthe Alla Bharya season 2	Judge	Mazhavil Manorama	Malayalam
2013	Jodi Number one season 6	Judge	Vijay TV	Tamil
2013	Bharthakkankarude Sradhakku	Judge	Asianet	Malayalam
2013	Vartha Prabhatham	Herself	Asianet	Malayalam
2013	Page 3	Herself	Kappa TV	Malayalam
2014	Veruthe Alla Bharya season 3	Judge	Mazhavil Manorama	Malayalam
2014	Star Jam	Herself	Kappa TV	Malayalam
2016	Uggram Ujjwalam Season 2	Judge	Mazhavil Manorama	Malayalam
2016–2017	Malayali Veetamma	Judge	Flowers	Malayalam
2016,2017	Comedy Super Nite Season 2	Herself	Flowers	Malayalam
2017	Lal Salam	Herself	Amrita TV	Malayalam
2017	Dancing Khilladies	Judge	Zee Tamil	Tamil
2017	Majaa Talkies	Herself	Colors Kannada	Kannada
2017	Zee Dance League	Judge	Zee Tamil	Tamil
2018	Alitho Saradaga	Herself	E TV	Telugu
2019	Lolluppa	Judge	Sun TV	Tamil
2019	Thakarppan Comedy	Herself	Mazhavil Manorama	Malayalam
2019	Andha Naal Nyabagam		Angel TV	Tamil
2020	Vanakkam Tamizha	Herself	Sun TV	Tamil
2021	Red Carpet	Mentor	Amrita TV	Malayalam
2021	Vanakkam Tamizha	Herself	Sun TV	Tamil
2021	Poova Thalaiya	Herself	Sun TV	Tamil
2021	Rajaparvai	Herself	Sun TV	Tamil
2022	Nayakane Ulakam Mega Event	Herself	Flowers	Malayalam
2022	Bumper Chiri Aaghosham	Herself	Mazhavil Manorama	Malayalam
2022	Comedy Stars season 3	Judge	Asianet	Malayalam
2023	Drama Juniors season 1	Judge	Zee Keralam	Malayalam
2023	Parayam Nedam	Participant	Amrita TV	Malayalam
2023	Ente Amma Superaa	Judge	Mazhavil Manorama	Malayalam
2023-2024	Star Magic	Mentor	Flowers TV	Malayalam
2024	Ithu Item Vere	Judge	Flowers TV	Malayalam
2025	Oru Chiri Iru Chiri Bumper Chiri	Judge	Mazhavil Manorama	Malayalam
2026	Drama Juniors season 2	Judge	Zee Keralam	Malayalam
