= Manavalan Joseph =

Indian actor

- Born: 12 January 1922; Fort Kochi, Malabar District, Madras Presidency, British India
- Died: 23 January 1986 (aged 64) [Madras] Tamil Nadu
- Occupation: Film actor
- Years active: 1954–1986

Manavalan Joseph was a Malayalam film actor who worked in many movies during the 1950s and 1960s. He died in 1986.

== Background ==
Joseph was born at Fort Kochi then in the Malabar District of the Madras Presidency of British India. His first film was Neelakuyyil in 1954. He was married to Thresia. The couple has three daughters and three sons. He died on 23 January 1986, of a heart attack while he was at Chennai for the dubbing of the movie Vartha.

== Filmography ==
=== 1950s ===
Year	Title	Role	Notes
1954	Neelakuyil	Naanu Nair	
1957	Minnaminugu		

=== 1960s ===
Year	Title	Role	Notes
1961	Unniyarcha	Konor	
1962	Bharya	Velayudhan	
1962	Palattu Koman	Astrologer	
1963	Kadalamma	Dumdum	
1963	Rebecca		
1964	Pazhassi Raja		
1964	Ayesha	Haque	
1965	Kattupookkal	Thommi	
1965	Kattu Thulasi		
1965	Odayil Ninnu	Mesthiri	
1966	Koottukar	Haji	
1966	Jail		
1966	Kayamkulam Kochunni	Thommichan	
1966	Kanakachilanka		
1966	Anarkali	Slave Trader	
1966	Penmakkal		
1967	Jeevikkan Anuvadikku		
1967	Bhagyamudra		
1967	Kasavuthattam	Thomas	
1967	Ramanan	Vallon	
1967	Balyakalasakhi		
1967	Chithramela		
1967	Mynatharuvi Kolakase		
1967	Khadeeja		
1967	Collector Malathy	Appunju	
1968	Karthika	Velu Pilla	
1968	Kaliyalla Kalyanam		
1968	Lakshaprabhu		
1968	Punnapra Vayalar	Kandarkunju	
1968	Kodungallooramma	Swami	
1968	Velutha Kathreena	Krishna Panikkar	
1969	Jwala	Police constable	
1969	Koottukudumbam	Soman	
1969	Mooladhanam	Kasim Pilla	
1969	Susie	Supervisor	
1969	Ballaatha Pahayan	Porinchu	
1969	Padicha Kallan		
1969	Vila Kuranja Manushyan		

=== 1970s ===
Year	Title	Role	Notes
1970	Sabarimala Sree Dharmashastha		
1970	Pearl View	Manavalan	
1970	Othenante Makan	Chappan	
1971	Jalakanyaka		
1971	Bobanum Moliyum	Pothan Vakkeel	
1972	Aromalunni	Unikkoran	
1972	Oru Sundariyude Katha	Divakaran	
1972	Postmane Kananilla	Krishnankutty	
1973	Ponnapuram Kotta		
1973	Masappady Mathupillai		
1974	Aswathy		
1974	Nadeenadanmare Avasyamundu		
1974	College Girl	Swami	
1974	Neelakannukal	Porinju	
1974	Durga	Aali	
1975	Ayodhya	Pakru	
1975	Love Marriage	Doctor	
1975	Love Letter		
1975	Chandanachola		
1975	Kalyaanappanthal		
1975	Mucheettukalikkarante Makal		
1975	Hello Darling	Mahadevan	
1975	Akkaldaama		
1975	Ashtamirohini		
1975	Abhimaanam	Haridas	
1975	Kaamam Krodham Moham		
1975	Criminals		
1976	Agni Pushpam		
1976	Sexilla Stundilla		
1976	Yakshagaanam	Pachupilla	
1976	Surveykkallu		
1976	Chirikkudukka	Kochachan	
1976	Ayalkkaari	Kittu Kuruppu	
1976	Pushpasharam		
1977	Aval Oru Devaalayam		
1977	Satyavan Savithri		
1977	Randu Lokam		
1977	Sreemad Bhagavadgeetha		
1977	Kaavilamma		
1977	Yudhakaandam		
1977	Parivarthanam	Warrier	
1977	Vezhambal		
1977	Varadakshina		
1978	Panchamrutham		
1978	Kaithappoo		
1978	Aval Viswasthayayirunnu		
1978	Mudramothiram	Mathai	
1978	Aaravam		
1978	Urakkam Varaatha Raathrikal		
1978	Mukkuvane Snehicha Bhootham	Bhootham	
1978	Aarum Anyaralla	Pappi	
1978	Kanalkattakal	Pappan	
1978	Velluvili		
1978	Rowdy Ramu	Sekhara Pilla	
1978	Sathrusamhaaram		
1978	Jayikkaanaay Janichavan	Udaya Varma	
1979	Maamaankam		
1979	Choola		
1979	Indradhanussu		
1979	Yakshi Paaru	Forest Guard	
1979	Rakthamillatha Manushyan	Anthrayose	
1979	Raathrikal Ninakku Vendi		
1979	Pushyaraagam		
1979	Vellayani Paramu	Keshu	
1979	Lovely		
1979	Kalliyankattu Neeli	Watcher Velappan Pillai	

=== 1980s ===
Year	Title	Role	Notes
1980	Puzha		
1980	Sakthi		
1980	Idi Muzhakkam	Valiya Panikkar	
1980	Akalangalil Abhayam	Apeksha Velu	
1980	Anthappuram	Policeman	
1980	Ithikkarappakki		
1980	Manushya Mrugam		
1980	Aagamanam	Padmanabhan	
1981	Dhruvasangamam	Lambodhara Panikkar	
1981	Vaadaka Veettile Athidhi		
1982	Ee Nadu	Police Constable	
1982	Aarambham	Sankaran	
1982	Maattuvin Chattangale		
1982	Paanjajanyam	Gopi	
1982	Aasha	Parameshwara Iyyer Swami	
1982	Jambulingam	Koyikkal Valiy Marthadan Pilla	
1982	Chilanthivala	Paramu	
1983	Pallamkuzhi		
1983	Nizhal Moodiya Nirangal	Pillechan	
1983	Iniyengilum		
1983	Bandham		
1983	Kolakomban		
1983	Kuyiline Thedi	Sankunni	
1983	Aattakalasam	Madhava	
1984	Ethirppukal	Kurup	
1984	Aattuvanchi Ulanjappol	Outhochan	
1984	Adiyozhukkukal		
1985	Vellarikka Pattanam	S.I. Hitlar Jose	
1985	Angadikkappurathu	Fernandez	
1985	Eeran Sandhya		
1985	Boeing Boeing	Ammavan	
1985	Kaanathaya Penkutty	Tea shop owner	
1985	Aa Neram Alppa Dooram		
1986	Dheem Tharikida Thom		
1986	Mazha Peyyunnu Maddalam Kottunnu		
1987	Ithrayum Kaalam	Moosakka	
