= Padichakallan =

- Directed by: M. Krishnan Nair
- Written by: S. L. Puram Sadanandan
- Screenplay by: S. L. Puram Sadanandan
- Produced by: A. L. Sreenivasan
- Starring: Prem Nazir; Adoor Bhasi; Manavalan Joseph; Pappukutty Bhagavathar
- Cinematography: V. Selvaraj
- Edited by: V. P. Krishnan
- Music by: G. Devarajan
- Production company: ALS Productions
- Distributed by: ALS Productions
- Release date: 10 January 1969
- Country: India
- Language: Malayalam

Padichakallan (English: A Learned Thief) is a 1969 Indian Malayalam-language film, directed by M. Krishnan Nair and produced by A. L. Sreenivasan. The film stars Prem Nazir, Adoor Bhasi, Manavalan Joseph and Pappukutty Bhagavathar. The film had musical score by G. Devarajan.

== Cast ==
- Prem Nazir
- Adoor Bhasi
- Manavalan Joseph
- Pappukutty Bhagavathar
- Sreelatha Namboothiri
- T. R. Omana
- Aranmula Ponnamma
- Bharathi Vishnuvardhan
- K. P. Ummer
- Krishnan
- Latha
- Paravoor Bharathan
- Radhika
- Snehalatha
- T. K. Balachandran
- Bharathi Vishnuvardhan (Heroine)

== Soundtrack ==
The music was composed by G. Devarajan with lyrics by Vayalar Ramavarma.

| No. | Song | Singers | Lyrics | Length (m:ss) |
|---|---|---|---|---|
| 1 | "Kandu Kothichu" | L. R. Eeswari | Vayalar Ramavarma | |
| 2 | "Kannente Mukhathottu" | C. O. Anto | Vayalar Ramavarma | |
| 3 | "Kilukilukkaam Kili" | P. Susheela | Vayalar Ramavarma | |
| 4 | "Manassum Manassum" | K. J. Yesudas, L. R. Eeswari | Vayalar Ramavarma | |
| 5 | "Thaananilathe Neerodu" | K. J. Yesudas | Vayalar Ramavarma | |
| 6 | "Urakkam Varaatha" | K. J. Yesudas, P. Susheela | Vayalar Ramavarma | |
| 7 | "Vidhimunpe Nizhal" | K. J. Yesudas | Vayalar Ramavarma | |
