= Pushpasharam =

- Directed by: J. Sasikumar
- Written by: Anvar Subair
- Screenplay by: Anvar Subair
- Produced by: Anvar
- Starring: Prem Nazir; Jayabharathi; Srividya; Adoor Bhasi
- Cinematography: J. G. Vijayam
- Edited by: K. Sankunni
- Music by: M. S. Baburaj
- Production company: Cine Bhagya
- Distributed by: Cine Bhagya
- Release date: 14 May 1976
- Country: India
- Language: Malayalam

Pushpasharam is a 1976 Indian Malayalam-language film directed by J. Sasikumar and produced by Anvar. The film stars Prem Nazir, Jayabharathi, Srividya and Adoor Bhasi in the lead roles. The film has musical score by M. S. Baburaj.

== Cast ==
- Prem Nazir
- Jayabharathi
- Srividya
- Adoor Bhasi
- Manavalan Joseph
- Prema
- Sreelatha Namboothiri
- T. S. Muthaiah
- Bahadoor
- Kuthiravattam Pappu
- M. G. Soman
- Meena
- S. P. Pillai
- Sadhana
- Sundicate Krishnan Nair
- Kollam G. K. Pillai

== Soundtrack ==
The music was composed by M. S. Baburaj and the lyrics were written by Anwar Suber.

No.	Song	Singers	Lyrics	Length (m:ss)
1	"Aaromal Paithalinaay" (Happy)	K. J. Yesudas	Anwar Suber	
2	"Aaromal Paithalinaay" (Pathos)	K. J. Yesudas, Chorus	Anwar Suber	
3	"Chandrikachaarthinte"	K. J. Yesudas, Vani Jairam	Anwar Suber	
4	"Engupoy Engupoy"	P. Jayachandran	Anwar Suber	
5	"Kavilinayil"	K. J. Yesudas	Anwar Suber	
6	"Kothikkothi"	Ambili, Sreelatha Namboothiri, Kollam G. K. Pillai	Anwar Suber	
