= Avakaasham =

1978 film

- Directed by: A. B. Raj
- Written by: A. B. Raj
- Screenplay by: A. B. Raj
- Starring: Jayabharathi; Jose Prakash; Sankaradi; Alummoodan
- Cinematography: R. S. Pathi
- Edited by: M. S. Mani
- Music by: M. K. Arjunan
- Production company: Chandrabindu Productions
- Distributed by: Chandrabindu Productions
- Release date: 19 May 1978
- Country: India
- Language: Malayalam

Avakaasham is a 1978 Indian Malayalam film, directed by A. B. Raj. The film stars Jayabharathi, Jose Prakash, Sankaradi and Alummoodan in the lead roles. The film has musical score by M. K. Arjunan.

== Cast ==
- Jayabharathi
- Jose Prakash
- Sankaradi
- Alummoodan
- M. G. Soman
- Vincent

== Soundtrack ==
The music was composed by M. K. Arjunan and the lyrics were written by P. Bhaskaran & Gopi Kottarappat.

No.	Song	Singers	Lyrics	Length (m:ss)
1	"Ente Swapnathin Maalikayil"	K. J. Yesudas	P. Bhaskaran	
2	"Olappeeppi oothi"	Vanijayaram	Gopi Kottarappat	
3	"Muralee neeyoru ganam"	S. Janaki	Gopi Kottarappat	
4	"Sandhyaa vandana"	Yesudas, Raveendran	Gopi Kottarappat	
