= Mukkuvane Snehicha Bhootham =

- Directed by: J. Sasikumar
- Written by: Anvar Subair; T. V. Gopalakrishnan (dialogues)
- Screenplay by: T. V. Gopalakrishnan
- Starring: M. G. Soman; Jayan; Janardanan; Jayabharathi; KPAC Lalitha; Manavalan Joseph; Sreelatha Namboothiri
- Cinematography: Vipin Das
- Edited by: Ravi
- Music by: K. J. Joy
- Production company: Sudarsanam Movie Makers
- Distributed by: Sudarsanam Movie Makers
- Release date: 19 March 1978
- Country: India
- Language: Malayalam
- Budget: The movie was a Big budget and box office hit

Mukkuvane Snehicha Bhootham is a 1978 Indian Malayalam film, directed by J. Sasikumar. The film stars M. G. Soman, Jayan, Nellikode Bhaskaran, Janardanan, Jayabharathi, KPAC Lalitha, Manavalan Joseph and Sreelatha Namboothiri in the lead roles. The film has musical score by K. J. Joy.

== Cast ==
- M. G. Soman as Rajan
- Jayan as Krishnan Kutty
- Janardanan as Lopez
- KPAC Lalitha as Chirutha
- Manavalan Joseph as Bhootham
- Sreelatha Namboothiri as Karthu
- Unni Mary as Ambili
- Kaduvakulam Antony
- Nellikode Bhaskaran as Keshavan
- Vettoor Purushan
- Kollam G. K. Pillai

== Soundtrack ==
The music was composed by K. J. Joy and the lyrics were written by Anwar Suber.

No.	Song	Singers	Length (m:ss)
1	"Aazhithiramaalakal"	Vani Jairam, Chorus, Idava Basheer	
2	"Arabikkadalum Ashtamudi"	P. Jayachandran	
3	"Mohangal Madaalasam"	K. J. Yesudas	
4	"Mullappoomanamo"	P. Susheela, P. Jayachandran	
