= Manpeda =

- Directed by: PMA Azeez
- Written by: Azeez V. A. A. Sreekumaran Thampi (dialogues)
- Produced by: Bahadoor
- Starring: Jayabharathi; Jesey; T. S. Muthaiah; Prem Navas
- Music by: M. S. Baburaj
- Production company: Chaithanyachitra
- Distributed by: Chaithanyachitra
- Release date: 14 April 1971
- Country: India
- Language: Malayalam

Manpeda is a 1971 Indian Malayalam film, directed by P. M. A. Azeez and produced by Bahadoor. The film stars Jayabharathi, Jesey, T. S. Muthaiah and Prem Navas in the lead roles. The film had musical score by M. S. Baburaj.

== Cast ==
- Jayabharathi
- Jesey
- T. S. Muthaiah
- Prem Nawas
- Bahadoor
- Nellikode Bhaskaran
- Raveendran

== Soundtrack ==
The music was composed by M. S. Baburaj and the lyrics were written by Sreekumaran Thampi.

No.	Song	Singers	Lyrics	Length (m:ss)
1	"Neelathaamarapoove"	Raveendran	Sreekumaran Thampi	
2	"Ushassinte Gopurangal"	Raveendran, Cochin Ibrahim	Sreekumaran Thampi	

== Additional information ==
Raveendran, who later became famous as a music director, has a role in the film.
