= Veedu Oru Swargam =

- Directed by: Jeassy
- Written by: V. T. Nandakumar
- Produced by: Isaac John
- Starring: Prem Nazir; Sheela; Sukumari; KPAC Lalitha
- Cinematography: Ramachandra Babu
- Music by: G. Devarajan
- Production company: Maharaja Films
- Distributed by: Maharaja Films
- Release date: 22 July 1977
- Country: India
- Language: Malayalam

Veedu Oru Swargam is a 1977 Indian Malayalam film directed by Jeassy and produced by Isaac John. The film stars Prem Nazir, Sheela, Sukumari and KPAC Lalitha in the lead roles. The film has musical score by G. Devarajan.

== Cast ==
- Prem Nazir
- Sheela
- Sukumari
- KPAC Lalitha
- Adoor Bhasi
- Sankaradi
- Janardanan
- K. P. Ummer
- M. G. Soman
- Vidhubala

== Soundtrack ==
The music was composed by G. Devarajan and the lyrics were written by Yusufali Kechery.

No.	Song	Singers	Lyrics	Length (m:ss)
1	"Braahma Muhoorthamunarnnu"	K. J. Yesudas	Yusufali Kechery	
2	"Devi Jyothirmayi"	P. Madhuri	Yusufali Kechery	
3	"Muraleelola Gopaala"	P. Jayachandran	Yusufali Kechery	
4	"Velutha Vaavinte"	P. Susheela, P. Jayachandran	Yusufali Kechery	
5	"Velutha Vaavinte"	Latha Raju	Yusufali Kechery	
