= Seetha (1980 film) =

- Directed by: P. Govindan
- Written by: M. Mukundan
- Screenplay by: M. Mukundan
- Produced by: P. Sreekumar
- Starring: Sukumari; Thikkurissy Sukumaran Nair; Nagavally R. S. Kurup; Ambika
- Cinematography: Madhu Ambat
- Edited by: P. Raman Nair
- Music by: M. K. Arjunan
- Production company: Chanthu Films
- Distributed by: Chanthu Films
- Release date: 19 December 1980
- Country: India
- Language: Malayalam

Seetha is a 1980 Indian Malayalam-language film, directed by P. Govindan. The film stars Sukumari, Thikkurissy Sukumaran Nair, Nagavally R. S. Kurup and Ambika. The film has musical score by M. K. Arjunan.

== Cast ==
- Sukumari
- Thikkurissy Sukumaran Nair
- Nagavally R. S. Kurup
- Ambika
- Aranmula Ponnamma
- Muralimohan
- Sasi
- Vidhubala
- Sukumaran

== Soundtrack ==
The music was composed by M. K. Arjunan and the lyrics were written by Sreekumaran Thampi.

No.	Song	Singers	Lyrics	Length (m:ss)
1	"Ammayum Makalum"	Vani Jairam	Sreekumaran Thampi	
2	"Naazhikakal Than Changalakal"	Jolly Abraham	Sreekumaran Thampi	
3	"Prabhaathamenikku Nee"	P. Jayachandran	Sreekumaran Thampi	
