= Anthappuram =

Anthappuram (1980)
- Directed by: K. G. Rajasekharan
- Screenplay by: K. G. Rajasekharan
- Produced by: B. V. K. Nair & Sasikumar for Mangalya Movie Makers
- Starring: Prem Nazir, Jayan, Sudheer, Seema, Ambika, Bhasi, Jose Prakash, Kaviyoor Ponnamma etc.
- Cinematography: Indu
- Edited by: V. P. Krishnan
- Music by: Shankar–Ganesh
- Production company: Mangalya Movie Makers
- Distributed by: Mangalya Movie Makers
- Release date: 14 November 1980
- Country: India
- Language: Malayalam

Anthappuram is a 1980 Indian Malayalam film, directed by K. G. Rajasekharan and produced by B. V. K. Nair. The film stars Prem Nazir, Ambika, Jayan, Seema, Sudheer and Kaviyoor Ponnamma in the lead roles. The film has musical score by Shankar–Ganesh.

== Cast ==
- Prem Nazir as Vijayan
- Ambika as Usha
- Jayan as Vasu
- Sudheer as Susheelan
- Kaviyoor Ponnamma as Bhavani
- Adoor Bhasi as Nair
- Jose Prakash as Sekhara Pillai
- Anandavally
- Baby Vandana
- Bindulekha
- Jagannatha Varma as Balakrishna Pillai
- Justin
- Kamal Roy as Child Artist
- Master Suresh
- Nellikode Bhaskaran as Asan
- Seema as Meenu
- Vanchiyoor Radha
- Manavalan Joseph as Policeman
- Thodupuzha Radhakrishnan as Inspector

== Soundtrack ==
The music was composed by Shankar–Ganesh and the lyrics were written by Mankombu Gopalakrishnan.

No.	Song	Singers	Lyrics	Length (m:ss)
1	"Gopura Vellari Praavukal Naam"	Ambili, Chorus	Mankombu Gopalakrishnan	
2	"Maanya Mahaa Janangale"	Vani Jairam	Mankombu Gopalakrishnan	
3	"Mukhakkuru Kavilinayil"	K. J. Yesudas	Mankombu Gopalakrishnan	
4	"Narayana"	Ambili	Mankombu Gopalakrishnan	

== see the film ==
- anthapuram
