= Criminals (film) =

- Directed by: S. Babu
- Written by: Salam Karassery
- Screenplay by: Salam Karassery
- Produced by: Salam Karassery
- Starring: Adoor Bhasi; Manavalan Joseph; Prema; Sreemoolanagaram Vijayan
- Cinematography: Vipin Das
- Edited by: G. Kalyana Sundaram
- Music by: M. S. Baburaj; Lyrics: Bichu Thirumala; Poovachal Khader; Sreemoolanagaram Vijayan
- Production company: Navadhara
- Distributed by: Navadhara
- Release date: 18 April 1975
- Country: India
- Language: Malayalam

Criminals is a 1975 Indian Malayalam film, directed by S. Babu and produced by Salam Karassery. The film stars Adoor Bhasi, Manavalan Joseph, Prema and Sreemoolanagaram Vijayan in the lead roles.

== Cast ==
- Adoor Bhasi
- Manavalan Joseph
- Prema
- Sreemoolanagaram Vijayan
- Nilambur Balan
- Alummoodan
- Aroor Sathyan
- Bharagavan Pallikkara
- J. A. R. Anand
- J. M. Kozhikode
- K. P. Ummer
- Kaduvakulam Antony
- Kambanam Murali
- Kunchan
- Kuthiravattam Pappu
- Malappuram Motheenkutty
- P. K. Abraham
- Paravana Abdulrahman
- Rani Chandra
- Salam
- Sinbad
- Surasu
- Swapna
- Swathi
- Ushanandini
- Vincent

== Soundtrack ==
The music was composed by M. S. Baburaj and the lyrics were written by Poovachal Khader, Sreemoolanagaram Vijayan and Bichu Thirumala.

No.	Song	Singers	Lyrics	Length (m:ss)
1	"Daivam Vannuvilichaal"	L. R. Anjali, Manoharan	Poovachal Khader	
2	"Kaanthaari"	Zero Babu	Sreemoolanagaram Vijayan	
3	"Kamalasharan Kazhchavacha"	K. J. Yesudas, L. R. Anjali	Bichu Thirumala	
4	"Purushanmarude Gandham"	S. Janaki	Poovachal Khader	
