= Jalakanyaka (film) =

- Directed by: M. S. Mani
- Written by: S. L. Puram Sadanandan
- Screenplay by: S. L. Puram Sadanandan
- Starring: Madhu; Kaviyoor Ponnamma; Jose Prakash; Manavalan Joseph
- Cinematography: Krishna Swami
- Edited by: N. R. Natarajan
- Music by: A. T. Ummer
- Production company: Kalalaya Films
- Distributed by: Kalalaya Films
- Release date: 19 March 1971
- Country: India
- Language: Malayalam

Jalakanyaka is a 1971 Indian Malayalam film, directed by M. S. Mani. The film stars Madhu, Kaviyoor Ponnamma, Jose Prakash and Manavalan Joseph in the lead roles. The film had musical score by A. T. Ummer.

== Cast ==
- Madhu
- Kaviyoor Ponnamma
- Jose Prakash
- Manavalan Joseph
- Pattom Sadan
- P. J. Antony
- Jesey
- Kottarakkara Sreedharan Nair
- Meena
- Nellikode Bhaskaran
- Ushanandini

== Soundtrack ==
The music was composed by A. T. Ummer and the lyrics were written by Dr. Pavithran.

No.	Song	Singers	Lyrics	Length (m:ss)
1	"Aadyaraavil Aathiraraavil"	K. J. Yesudas, S. Janaki	Dr. Pavithran	
2	"Aaro Aaro Aaraamabhoomiyil"	S. Janaki	Dr. Pavithran	
3	"Ezhu Kadalodi"	K. J. Yesudas, P. Jayachandran, P. B. Sreenivas	Dr. Pavithran	
4	"Onne Onne Po Po"	P. Leela, Chorus	Dr. Pavithran	
5	"Varavaayee Vellimeen Thoni"	K. J. Yesudas	Dr. Pavithran	
