= Pourasham =

- Directed by: J. Sasikumar
- Written by: Pappanamkodu Lakshmanan
- Screenplay by: Pappanamkodu Lakshmanan
- Produced by: Prasad; Paulson
- Starring: Kaviyoor Ponnamma; Menaka; Sukumaran; Alummoodan
- Cinematography: K. B. Dayalan
- Edited by: K. Sankunni
- Music by: A. T. Ummer
- Production companies: P&P Productions
- Distributed by: P&P Productions
- Release date: 14 January 1983
- Country: India
- Language: Malayalam

Pourasham is a 1983 Indian Malayalam-language film directed by J. Sasikumar and produced by Prasad and Paulson. The film stars Kaviyoor Ponnamma, Menaka, Sukumaran and Alummoodan. The film's score was composed by A. T. Ummer.

== Cast ==
- Kaviyoor Ponnamma as Saraswathi
- Menaka as Janu
- Sukumaran as Sreeni
- Alummoodan as Achuthan
- Janardanan as Lorence
- K. P. Ummer as Rajasekharan Thampi
- M. G. Soman as Gopi
- Mala Aravindan as Tomy
- Meena as Chellamma
- Nellikode Bhaskaran as Bheeran
- C. I. Paul as Kurup
- Latha as Usha
- Vanchiyoor Radha as Achamma
- Kollam G. K. Pillai as Vasu
- Thodupuzha Radhakrishnan as Damu

== Soundtrack ==
The music was composed by A. T. Ummer with lyrics by Vellanad Narayanan.

No.	Song	Singers	Lyrics	Length (m:ss)
1	"Iniyum Ithal Choodi"	K. J. Yesudas, S. Janaki	വെള്ളനാട് നാരായണൻ	
2	"Jeevithappoovanathil"	K. J. Yesudas, Chorus, Kalyani Menon	Vellanad narayanan	
3	"Oru Neram Kanjikku"	K. J. Yesudas, Chorus	Vellanad Narayanan	
