= Chandanachola =

1975 film

- Directed by: Jeassy
- Written by: Dr. Balakrishnan
- Screenplay by: Dr. Balakrishnan
- Produced by: Dr. Balakrishnan
- Starring: Vincent; Sudheer; Vidhubala; Jose Prakash; Manavalan Joseph; Pattom Sadan; Sankaradi
- Cinematography: Kanniyappan
- Edited by: G. Venkittaraman
- Music by: K. J. Joy
- Production company: Rekha Cine Arts
- Distributed by: Rekha Cine Arts
- Release date: 20 June 1975
- Country: India
- Language: Malayalam

Chandanachola is a 1975 Indian Malayalam film, directed by Jeassy and produced by Dr. Balakrishnan. The film stars Jose Prakash, Sudheer, Vidhubala and Vincent in the lead roles. The film had musical score by K. J. Joy.

== Cast ==
- Vincent
- Sudheer
- Jose Prakash
- Vidhubala
- Baby Indira
- Manavalan Joseph
- Pattom Sadan
- Sankaradi
- Sunil
- Nilambur Balan
- K. R. Kumaran Nair
- Kuthiravattam Pappu
- Paravoor Bharathan
- Reena
- Sadhana
- Sukumaran Nair
- T. P. Madhavan
- Victory Janardanan

== Soundtrack ==
All music is composed by K. J. Joy.

No.	Title	Lyrics	Artist(s)	Length
1.	"Bindu Neeyananda"	Dr. Balakrishnan	P. Susheela
2.	"Bindu Neeyen Jeeva"	Dr. Balakrishnan	P. Susheela
3.	"Hridayam Marannu"	Muppathu Ramachandran	K. J. Yesudas
4.	"Lovely Evening"	Konniyoor Bhas	Vani Jairam
5.	"Maniyaanchettikku"	Dr. Balakrishnan	K. J. Yesudas, Pattom Sadan
6.	"Mukhasree Kunkumam"	Vayalar Ramavarma	K. J. Yesudas
