= Nizhal Moodiya Nirangal =

- Directed by: Jeassy
- Written by: John Alunkal; Joseph Madappally (dialogues)
- Screenplay by: Joseph Madappally
- Produced by: P. A. Thomas
- Starring: Sharada; Ratheesh; Bharath Gopi; Ambika
- Cinematography: Vipin Das
- Edited by: M. Umanath
- Music by: KJ Joy
- Production company: Thomas Pictures
- Distributed by: Thomas Pictures
- Release date: 2 December 1983
- Country: India
- Language: Malayalam

Nizhal Moodiya Nirangal is a 1983 Indian Malayalam-language film, directed by Jeassy and produced by P. A. Thomas. The film stars Sharada, Ratheesh, Bharath Gopi and Ambika in the lead roles. The film has musical score by KJ Joy.

== Cast ==
- Bharath Gopi as Unni
- Sharada as Sosamma
- Ratheesh as Baby
- Ambika as Molamma
- Balan K. Nair as Thambi
- Jagathy Sreekumar as Nanappan
- Kaviyoor Ponnamma as Thambi & Unni's Mother
- Manavalan Joseph as Pillechan
- P. A. Thomas as Cherian
- Master Piyush
- Master Prince
- Kalaranjini as Daisy
- Achankunju as Achankunju
- Alummoodan
- Baby Sangeetha
- Baby Vandana
- Bahadoor as Kunjaalikka
- Chandraji
- Mala Aravindan as Kuruppachan
- Ranipadmini as Leela
- Ravi Menon as Boban
- Santhakumari as Thresya
- Silk Smitha as Cabaret Dancer

== Soundtrack ==
The music was composed by K. J. Joy and the lyrics were written by Sreekumaran Thampi.

No.	Song	Singers	Length (m:ss)
1	"Kaliyarangil"	Vani Jairam	
2	"Ormakal Paadiya"	K. J. Yesudas	
3	"Oru Maalayil"	P. Susheela, Chorus	
4	"Poomaram Oru Poomaram"	Vani Jairam	
