= Aadyathe Anuraagam =

- Directed by: V. S. Nair
- Written by: V. S. Nair
- Screenplay by: V. S. Nair
- Produced by: M. A. Sherif
- Starring: Prem Nazir; Sukumari; Adoor Bhasi; Ambika
- Cinematography: Vipin Das
- Edited by: G. Venkittaraman
- Music by: Raveendran
- Production company: Remmis Movies
- Distributed by: Remmis Movies
- Release date: 8 July 1983
- Country: India
- Language: Malayalam

Aadyathe Anuraagam is a 1983 Indian Malayalam film, directed by V. S. Nair and produced by M. A. Sherif. The film stars Prem Nazir, Sukumari, Adoor Bhasi and Ambika. The musical score is by Raveendran.

== Cast ==
- Prem Nazir as Suresh
- Sukumari as Syamala's mother
- Adoor Bhasi as Janardhanan Pilla/Suresh's father
- Ambika as Syamala
- M. G. Soman as Jayan
- Ramu as Rajasekharan Thampi
- Reena as Sushamma
- Kundara Johnny as Rasheed
- Baby Shalini as Rajumon
- Adam Ayub as Madanan

== Soundtrack ==
The music was composed by Raveendran and the lyrics were written by Madhu Alappuzha and Devadas.

| No. | Song | Singers | Lyrics | Length (m:ss) |
|---|---|---|---|---|
| 1 | "Maampoo Choodiya Makaram" | P. Jayachandran | Madhu Alappuzha | |
| 2 | "Manjakkanikkonna" | S. Janaki | Madhu Alappuzha | |
| 3 | "Puthumulla Poove Arimulla Poove" | K. J. Yesudas | Devadas | |
| 4 | "Raagam Anuraagam" | K. J. Yesudas, Sujatha Mohan | Devadas | |
