= Soosi =

- Directed by: Kunchacko
- Written by: Thoppil Bhasi
- Screenplay by: Thoppil Bhasi
- Produced by: M. Kunchacko
- Starring: Prem Nazir; Sharada; Adoor Bhasi; Hari
- Music by: G. Devarajan
- Production company: Excel Productions
- Distributed by: Excel Productions
- Release date: 5 April 1969
- Country: India
- Language: Malayalam

Soosi is a 1969 Indian Malayalam-language film directed and produced by Kunchacko. The film stars Prem Nazir, Sharada, Adoor Bhasi and Hari in the lead roles. The film has musical score by G. Devarajan.

== Cast ==
- Prem Nazir as Rajan
- Sharada as Susie
- Adoor Bhasi as Dallal Lazar
- Hari as George
- Manavalan Joseph as Supervisor
- P. J. Antony as Ouseppachan
- Sreelatha Namboothiri as Jolly
- Alummoodan as Thaaraavukaaran
- G. Gopinath as Income Tax Officer
- Kaduvakulam Antony as Clerk
- Kottarakkara Sreedharan Nair as Chacko Sir
- N. Govindankutty as Driver Kutty
- Raghavan Nair as Joy
- S. P. Pillai as Thomachan

== Soundtrack ==
The music was composed by G. Devarajan and the lyrics were written by Vayalar Ramavarma.

No.	Song	Singers	Lyrics	Length (m:ss)
1	"Ee Kaikalil Rakthamundo"	K. J. Yesudas	Vayalar Ramavarma	
2	"Jil Jil Jil"	B. Vasantha, Chorus	Vayalar Ramavarma	
3	"Maanathe Mandakini"	P. Susheela	Vayalar Ramavarma	
4	"Naazhikakku Naalppathu"	P. Susheela	Vayalar Ramavarma	
5	"Nithyakaamuki"	K. J. Yesudas	Vayalar Ramavarma	
6	"Rakthachandanam"	K. J. Yesudas, P. Susheela	Vayalar Ramavarma	
7	"Sindoora Meghame"	P. Susheela	Vayalar Ramavarma	
