= Alummoodan =

Indian film actor (1933–1992)

- Born: Dominic Alummoodu; 15 March 1933; Changanassery, Kingdom of Travancore, British India (present day Kottayam, Kerala, India)
- Died: 3 May 1992 (aged 59)
- Occupation: Actor
- Years active: 1967 – 1992
- Spouse: Rosamma Dominic
- Children: 6 (incl. Boban Alummoodan)
- Parents: Alummoottil Joseph; Rosamma

Dominic Alummoodu, known by his stage name Alummoodan (15 March 1933 – 3 May 1992) was an Indian actor who worked in Malayalam films. He acted in more than 100 films and mainly did comedy roles.

== Background ==
Alummoodan was born as Dominic to Rosamma and Joseph of the Alummoottil House in Changanacherry. His stage name came from his family name Alummoodu.

He was married to Rosamma Dominic. They have six children, 2 sons and 4 daughters. His son Boban Alummoodan is also an actor in Malayalam movies.

He died on 3 May 1992 due to a heart attack. His death occurred during the shooting of a film named Adwaitham, directed by Priyadarshan and starring Mohanlal in the lead role. He portrayed the role of a minister in Adwaitham, and his last words were the film dialogue 'Swami enne rakshikkanam' (Swami, please save me), which he told to Mohanlal, portraying the role of a saint. He died on the spot. He was a well-known stage artist too, and he managed his own drama theatre named "Changanaserry Anaswara" even in his busy film career. One of his notable performances is in Changanaserry Geedha's famous play "Ezhu Rathrikal" written by Kalady Gopi and Directed by Sri.Geedha Chachappan. Alummoodan played "Ettukali mammoonju" a wicked character years after still remembers. Later the play made in celluloid and he appeared on the same role. "Araada Valiyavan" "Njanaada Paraayi, Moota" are some of his famous plays in the mid-1980s.

== Filmography ==
=== 1960s ===
| Year | Title | Role | Notes |
|---|---|---|---|
| 1966 | Anarkali | Afghani warrior | |
| 1967 | Mynatharuvi Kolakase | | |
| 1968 | Ezhu Raathrikal | | |
| 1969 | Koottukudumbam | Unnithan | |
| 1969 | Susie | Thaaraavukaaran | |
| 1969 | Nadhi | Paili | |

=== 1970s ===
| Year | Title | Role | Notes |
|---|---|---|---|
| 1970 | Olavum Theeravum | Narayanan | |
| 1970 | Nilakkatha Chalanangal | | |
| 1970 | Thara | Pappu | |
| 1970 | Detective 909 Keralathil | | |
| 1970 | Kuttavaali | Master Menon | |
| 1970 | Thriveni | Neelakandan | |
| 1970 | Aa Chithrashalabham Parannotte | Lukka | |
| 1970 | Ningalenne Communistakki | Velu | |
| 1970 | Pearl View | Member of Drama Troupe | |
| 1970 | Othenente Makan | Koman Nair | |
| 1970 | Dathuputhran | Mathai | |
| 1970 | Madhuvidhu | Koluthu | |
| 1971 | Aval Alpam Vaikippoyi | | |
| 1971 | Kochaniyathi | Pappu Pilla | |
| 1971 | Line Bus | Chackochan | |
| 1971 | Kalithozhi | Vaidyar Antony | |
| 1971 | Marunaattil Oru Malayaali | Chandikunju | |
| 1971 | Agni Mrugam | Dominic | |
| 1971 | Karinizhal | Devassya | |
| 1971 | Karakanakadal | Kunjaammoo | |
| 1971 | Muthassi | Menon | |
| 1971 | Panchavan Kaadu | Chinda Swami | |
| 1971 | Sarasayya | Karunan | |
| 1971 | Gangaasangamam | Paappan | |
| 1971 | Lora Nee Evide | Jeoffrey | |
| 1972 | Professor | Raju Malathinkal | |
| 1972 | Aromalunni | | |
| 1972 | Prathikaram | Peethambharan | |
| 1972 | Pulliman | | |
| 1972 | Oru Sundariyude Katha | Nanukuttan | |
| 1972 | Postmane Kananilla | Sekharan | |
| 1972 | Akkarapacha | Chellappan | |
| 1972 | Aadyathe Kadha | Padmanabha Pilla | |
| 1972 | Gandharavakshetram | Jose | |
| 1972 | Omana | Padmanabha Pilla | |
| 1973 | Panitheeratha Veedu | Vaasu | |
| 1973 | Football Champion | Mathew Koshi | |
| 1973 | Yamini | Naanukuttan | |
| 1973 | Ponnapuram Kotta | | |
| 1973 | Enippadikal | | |
| 1973 | Maasappadi Maathupilla | | |
| 1974 | Vishnu Vijayam | Chacko | |
| 1974 | Nadeenadanmaare Aavasyamundu | | |
| 1974 | Honeymoon | | |
| 1974 | Bhoogolam Thiriyunnu | Prakkattu Kurup | |
| 1974 | Kanyakumari | Bhaskaran | |
| 1975 | Neela Ponman | Kumaran | |
| 1975 | Ma Nishadha | Ouseph | |
| 1975 | Madhurappathinezhu | | |
| 1975 | Penpada | Kunjiraman | |
| 1975 | Chattambikkalyaani | Marmam Mammad | |
| 1975 | Ulsavam | Swa Le | |
| 1975 | Odakkuzhal | | |
| 1975 | Hello Darling | Harshan Pilla | |
| 1975 | Chalanam | | |
| 1975 | Mucheettukalikkarante Makal | Aanavari Raman Nair | |
| 1975 | Chief Guest | | |
| 1975 | Criminals | | |
| 1976 | Abhinandanam | Naanu ashan | |
| 1976 | Lakshmivijayam | | |
| 1976 | Paarijaatham | | |
| 1976 | Thulavarsham | Pappachan Nair | |
| 1976 | Chennaaya Valarthiya Kutty | | |
| 1977 | Chathurvedam | | |
| 1977 | Chakravarthini | | |
| 1977 | Achaaram Ammini Osharam Omana | Gopala Pilla | |
| 1977 | Yudhakaandam | | |
| 1978 | Thacholi Ambu | | |
| 1978 | Iniyum Puzhayozhukum | Sekhar | |
| 1978 | Vayanaadan Thampan | | |
| 1978 | Padmatheertham | Krishna Pilla | |
| 1978 | Beena | Pilla | |
| 1978 | Kaithappoo | | |
| 1978 | Arum Anyaralla | Thommi | |
| 1978 | Avakaasham | | |
| 1978 | Kadathanaattu Maakkam | Velu | |
| 1978 | Tiger Salim | | |
| 1979 | Iniyum Kaanaam | Keshavan | |
| 1979 | Vijayanum Veeranum | Appu | |
| 1979 | Maamaankam | | |
| 1979 | Pichathy Kuttappan | Paropakari Narayanan | |
| 1979 | Driver Madyapichirunnu | | |
| 1979 | Thuramukham | Kochuthresia's brother | |
| 1979 | Mani Koya Kurup | | |

=== 1980s ===
| Year | Title | Role | Notes |
|---|---|---|---|
| 1980 | Puzha | | |
| 1980 | Paalaattu Kunjikkannan | | |
| 1980 | Manjil Virinja Pookkal | Khushalan | |
| 1980 | Vedikkettu | | |
| 1980 | Ithikkara Pakki | | |
| 1981 | Dhruvasangamam | Madhavapilla | |
| 1981 | Agnisaram | | |
| 1981 | Ellaam Ninakku Vendi | Inspector | |
| 1981 | Ariyapedatha Rahasyam | Andrews | |
| 1981 | Swarnappakshikal | | |
| 1981 | Sanchari | Palpu | |
| 1981 | Swarangal Swapnagal | Kunjiraman | |
| 1981 | Kadathu | School Peon Kittu Pilla | |
| 1981 | Dhanya | | |
| 1982 | Thuranna Jail | Dasappan | |
| 1982 | Madhrasile Mon | | |
| 1982 | Ee Nadu | Reporter | |
| 1982 | Paanjajanyam | Thunjath | |
| 1982 | Padayottam | Udayanan's helper | |
| 1982 | Jambulingam | Gopala Pilla | |
| 1983 | Pallaankuzhi | Madhavan | |
| 1983 | Nizhal Moodiya Nirangal | | |
| 1983 | Swapname Ninakku Nandi | Broker | |
| 1983 | Kolakkomban | Mathai | |
| 1983 | Thaavalam | Outhakutty | |
| 1983 | Pourusham | Achuthan | |
| 1983 | Marakkillorikkalum | Gopi | |
| 1983 | Eettillam | Kochappi | |
| 1984 | My Dear Kuttichathan | | |
| 1984 | Panchavadi Palam | Yudaskunju | |
| 1984 | Ethirppukal | Pathros | |
| 1984 | Mukhamukham | | |
| 1985 | Yathra | Paramu Nair | |
| 1985 | Kaanaathaaya Penkutti | Abdu | |
| 1986 | Nimishangal | Druthi Keshava Pilla | |
| 1986 | Ambili Ammavan | | |
| 1986 | Kunjaattakkilikal | | |
| 1987 | Aalippazhangal | Pachu Pilla | |
| 1987 | Kayyethum Doorathu | | |

=== 1990s ===
| Year | Title | Role | Notes |
|---|---|---|---|
| 1990 | Appu | Pushkaran | |
| 1990 | Vidhyarambham | R. K. Nedungadi | |
| 1991 | Mimics Parade | Kasargod Khader Bhai | |
| 1992 | Aayushkalam | Velu Mooppan | |
| 1992 | Ulsavamelam | DKP | |
| 1992 | Kasargod Khader Bhai | Kasargod Khader Bhai | |
| 1992 | Ennodu Ishtam Koodamo | Kunjikkuttan / Principal | |
| 1992 | Kamaladalam | Theatrical troupe owner | |
| 1992 | Adwaytham | State Minister | |
| 1993 | Kanyakumariyil Oru Kavitha | | |
| 1997 | My Dear Kuttichathan | | |

=== 2010s ===
| Year | Title | Role | Notes |
|---|---|---|---|
| 2010 | Again Kasargod Khader Bhai | Kasargod Khader Bhai | Photo Archive |
