= Gangasangamam =

- Directed by: J. D. Thottan; Paul Kallungal
- Written by: Ponkunnam Varkey
- Based on: Gangasangamam by Ponkunnam Varkey
- Produced by: Paul Kallungal
- Starring: Prem Nazir; Ragini; Jayabharathi; Thikkurissy Sukumaran Nair; Jesey
- Cinematography: P. Ramaswami
- Edited by: V. P. Krishnan
- Music by: G. Devarajan
- Production company: PK Films
- Release date: 17 December 1971
- Country: India
- Language: Malayalam

Gangasangamam (lit. 'Sacred union') is a 1971 Indian Malayalam-language film, directed by J. D. Thottan and written by Ponkunnam Varkey. The film stars Prem Nazir, Jayabharathi, Thikkurissy Sukumaran Nair, and Jesey. It is based on Varkey's play of the same name.

== Cast ==
- Prem Nazir as Thomaskutty/Father Clement
- Ragini as Philomina/Mini
- Kottarakkara Sreedharan Nair
- Thikkurissy Sukumaran Nair as Michael
- T. S. Muthaiah as Arakkal Maathai
- Jayabharathi as Molly
- Jesey as Johnny
- Paul Vengola as Philippose
- Alummoodan as Paappan
- Bahadoor as Anthru
- Pala Thankam as Thomaskutty's mother
- Meena
- Muthukulam Raghavan Pillai as Paili
- Girija as Thankamma
- Sreelatha Namboothiri as Nalini
- Alummoodan
- Unni Mary as Mary (child artist)

== Soundtrack ==
The music was composed by G. Devarajan and the lyrics were written by Vayalar Ramavarma.

No.	Song	Singers	Lyrics	Length (m:ss)
1	"Manasa Vaacha Karmana"	K. J. Yesudas	Vayalar Ramavarma	
2	"Mohalaasyam Madhuramoru"	P. Susheela	Vayalar Ramavarma	
3	"Munthirikkudilil"	P. Jayachandran	Vayalar Ramavarma	
4	"Ushasse"	P. Madhuri	Vayalar Ramavarma	
