= Agni Pushpam =

- Poster
- Directed by: Jesey
- Screenplay by: S. L. Puram Sadanandan
- Produced by: D. P. Nair
- Starring: Kamal Haasan; Jayabharathi; Jayan; Sukumari
- Cinematography: Ramachandra Babu
- Edited by: K. Sankunni
- Music by: M. K. Arjunan
- Production company: Girish Movie Makers
- Release date: 9 January 1976
- Country: India
- Language: Malayalam

Agni Pushpam (transl. Fire flower) is a 1976 Indian Malayalam-language film, directed by Jesey and produced by D. P. Nair. The film stars Kamal Haasan, Jayabharathi, Jayan and Sukumari. The film has musical score by M. K. Arjunan.

== Cast ==
- Kamal Haasan as Somu
- Jayabharathi as Reshmi
- Jayan as Police Inspector
- Sukumari
- K. P. A. C. Lalitha
- Thikkurissy Sukumaran Nair
- Jose Prakash
- Manavalan Joseph
- Sankaradi
- Kuthiravattam Pappu
- Adoor Bhavani
- M. G. Soman
- Master Raghu
- N. Govindan Kutty
- Reena
- Sudheer
- Chandraji
- T. P. Radhamani

== Production ==
Agni Pushpam film produced by D. P. Nair under production banner Girish Movie Makers. It was given an "A" (adults only) certificate by the Central Board of Film Certification. The final length of the film was 4,383.63 metres (14,382.0 ft).

== Soundtrack ==
Agni Pushpam

Soundtrack album by M. K. Arjunan
- Released: 1976
- Genre: Feature film soundtrack
- Language: Malayalam
- Producer: M. K. Arjunan
External audio
- Official Audio Jukebox on YouTube

The music was composed by M. K. Arjunan and the lyrics were written by O. N. V. Kurup.

No.	Song	Singers	Lyrics	Length (m:ss)
1	"Anuraagathinanuraagam"	P. Jayachandran, Vani Jayaram	O. N. V. Kurup	
2	"Chingakkulirkaatte"	P. Jayachandran, Manoharan, Selma George	O. N. V. Kurup	
3	"Eden Thottathin Ekaanthathayil"	K. J. Yesudas	O. N. V. Kurup	
4	"Maanum Mayilum"	P. Susheela, Selma George	O. N. V. Kurup	
5	"Naadabrahmamayi"	K. J. Yesudas	O. N. V. Kurup	
