= Aniyaatha Valakal =

Aniyatha Valakkal
- Directed by: Balachandra Menon
- Written by: Balachandra Menon
- Screenplay by: Balachandra Menon
- Produced by: N. P. Abu
- Starring: Sukumaran; Ambika; M. G. Soman; Venu Nagavally; Sankaradi
- Cinematography: Vipin Das
- Edited by: G. Venkittaraman
- Music by: A. T. Ummer
- Production company: Priya Films
- Distributed by: Priya Films
- Release date: 1 August 1980
- Country: India
- Language: Malayalam

Aniyatha Valakal is a 1980 Indian Malayalam-language film directed by Balachandra Menon and produced by N. P. Abu. The film stars Sukumaran, M. G. Soman, Venu Nagavally and Sankaradi in the lead roles. The film has musical score by A. T. Ummer.

== Cast ==
- Sukumaran as Kumar/Ganesh
- M. G. Soman
- Venu Nagavally
- Sankaradi
- Jagathy Sreekumar
- Ambika
- Shubha
- K. P. A. C. Azeez
- T. R. Omana
- Alleppey Ashraf
- Sreelatha Namboothiri
- Santhakumari

== Soundtrack ==
The music was composed by A. T. Ummer.

| No. | Song | Singers | Lyrics | Length (m:ss) |
|---|---|---|---|---|
| 1 | "Madiyil Mayangunna" | S. Janaki | Bichu Thirumala | |
| 2 | "Oru Mayilpeeliyaay Njan" | Bichu Thirumala, S. Janaki | Bichu Thirumala | |
| 3 | "Padinjaaru Chaayunna" | K. J. Yesudas, Vani Jairam | Bichu Thirumala | |
| 4 | "Piriyunna Kaivazhikal" | K. J. Yesudas | Bichu Thirumala | |
