= Sarovaram (film) =

- Poster designed by Gayathri Ashokan
- Directed by: Jeassy
- Written by: Dennis Joseph
- Produced by: K. M. Abraham for Santhosh Movie Tone
- Starring: Mammootty; Narendra Prasad; Jayasudha; Thilakan
- Cinematography: Vipin Das
- Edited by: K. P. Hariharaputhran
- Music by: S. P. Venkitesh
- Distributed by: Manorajyam
- Release date: 27 August 1993
- Country: India
- Language: Malayalam

Sarovaram is a 1993 Indian Malayalam-language film, directed by Jeassy and produced by K. M. Abraham, starring Mammootty, Narendra Prasad, Jayasudha and Thilakan. The film was a commercial failure at the box office.

== Plot ==
Sarovaram tells the story of the life of a musician named Devadathan, played by Mammootty.

== Cast ==
- Mammootty as Devadathan
- Jayasudha as Rajalakshmi / Sony
- Thilakan as Vadasseriyil Neelakandan Namboothiri
- Narendra Prasad as Ananthan
- Shubha as Balamani
- Ashokan
- Mala Aravindan
- Janardhanan
- Rekha as Devu
- Geetha Vijayan as Jaya
- Ragini
- Zeenath
- Kuthiravattam Pappu as Cook
- Rizabawa as Old friend of Rajalakshmi

== Soundtrack ==
- "Moovanthipennine" - K. S. Chithra
- "Ambilichangaathi (Female)" - K. S. Chithra
- "Ambilichangaathi (Male)" - K. J. Yesudas
- "Ohmkara Ganga Tharangam" - K. J. Yesudas
- "Devamanohari Veendum" - K. J. Yesudas
