= Swarangal Swapnagal =

Swarangal Swapnangal
- Directed by: A. N. Thampi
- Produced by: K. M. Thomas
- Starring: Jayabharathi; Srividya; Jose; Ambika
- Cinematography: Vipin Das
- Edited by: G. Venkittaraman
- Music by: G. Devarajan
- Production company: Ramya
- Distributed by: Ramya
- Release date: 24 April 1981
- Country: India
- Language: Malayalam

Swarangal Swapnangal (English translation: Voices And Dreams) is a 1981 Indian Malayalam film, directed by A. N. Thampi and produced by K. M. Thomas under the banner of Ramya Motion Picture Producers. The film stars M. G. Soman, Jayabharathi, Srividya, Shubha, Jose and Ambika in the lead roles. The film has musical score by G. Devarajan.

== Cast ==
- Jayabharathi as Indira
- Srividya as Ramani
- Jose as Ravi
- Ambika as Latha
- M. G. Soman as Prabhakaran
- Sukumari as Teacher
- Sankaradi as Janardhanan
- Shubha as Usha
- Alummoodan as Kunjiraman
- K. P. A. C. Azeez as Stephen
- Baby Ponnambili as Ambili
- Baby Sangeetha as Anitha
- Jagannatha Varma as Dr. Mohan
- Kunchan as Thankamani
- Lalithasree as Kalyani
- Santhakumari as Rani

== Soundtrack ==
The music was composed by G. Devarajan and the lyrics were written by A. P. Gopalan and Sreekantan Nair.

No.	Song	Singers	Lyrics	Length (m:ss)
1	"Achan Sundara Sooryan"	P. Jayachandran, P. Madhuri, Kalyani Menon, Latha Raju	A. P. Gopalan	
2	"Ambottikkunjinte"	P. Madhuri	A. P. Gopalan	
3	"Ilakkili Ilakkili"	K. J. Yesudas	A. P. Gopalan	
4	"Priyadarshini Varoo"	K. J. Yesudas	Sreekantan Nair	
5	"Shivagangaa Theerthamaadum"	K. J. Yesudas	A. P. Gopalan	
