= Pratheeksha =

- Directed by: Chandrahasan
- Written by: Sandya; Chandrahasan (dialogues)
- Screenplay by: Chandrahasan
- Produced by: Sreekumar; Vijayakumar
- Starring: Madhu; Mohan Sharma; Adoor Bhavani; Ambika
- Cinematography: Jayanan Vincent
- Edited by: G. Venkitaraman
- Music by: Salil Chowdhary
- Production company: Thakshasila Films
- Distributed by: Thakshasila Films
- Release date: 9 November 1979
- Country: India
- Language: Malayalam

Pratheeksha is a 1979 Indian Malayalam-language film, directed by Chandrahasan and produced by Sreekumar and Vijayakumar. The film stars Madhu, Mohan Sharma, Adoor Bhavani and Ambika. The film's score was composed by Salil Chowdhary.

== Cast ==
- Madhu
- Mohan Sharma
- M. G. Soman
- Bhavani
- Ambika
- Vidhubala
- Thikkurissy Sukumaran Nair
- T. P. Madhavan

== Soundtrack ==
The music was composed by Salil Chowdhary with lyrics by O. N. V. Kurup.

No.	Song	Singers	Lyrics	Length (m:ss)
1	"Aathirappoo"	K. J. Yesudas	O. N. V. Kurup	
2	"Kochu Swapnangal"	S. Janaki	O. N. V. Kurup	
3	"Nerukayil Nee"	S. Janaki	O. N. V. Kurup	
4	"Ormakale"	K. J. Yesudas	O. N. V. Kurup	
