= Jeassy =

Indian film director and actor

Jaycey Kuttikkat
- Born: 17 August 1938; Ernakulam
- Died: 10 April 2001 (aged 62); Ernakulam
- Occupations: Actor, film director, Writer
- Years active: 1965–1997
- Spouse: Baby
- Children: Sherly
- Father: KV Joseph
- Relatives: Abraham Lincoln (Brother)

Jeassy, also known as J. C. or Jesey, was an Indian director and actor of Malayalam movies. His first film as an actor was Ramu Kariat's Ezhu Rathrikal. Some of his notable films as an actor were Adimakal, Kallichellamma, Allahu Akbar, Manpeda, Kuttyedathi and Ganga Sangamam. Shapamoksham, made in 1974, was his first film as a director. Since the early 1970s, he has directed some 30 movies. Steven Spielberg of Malayalam cinema, Santhivila Dinesh, considers him his master.

== Filmography ==
=== Director ===
- Shapamoksham (1974)
- Aswathy (1974)
- Chandanan Chola (1975)
- Sindhooram (1976)
- Agni Pushpam (1976)
- Rajaankanam (1976)
- Veedu Oru Swargam (1977)
- Aval Viswasthayayirunnu (1978)
- Aarum Anyaralla (1978)
- Thuramukham (1979)
- Rakthamillatha Manushyan (1979)
- Ezhunirangal (1979)
- Puzha (1980)
- Pavizha Mutthu (1980)
- Dooram Arike (1980)
- Akalangalil Abhayam (1980)
- Aagamanam (1980)
- Thaaraavu (1981)
- Oru Vilippadakale (1982)
- Ethiraalikal (1982)
- Nizhal Moodiya Nirangal (1983)
- Orikkal Oridathu (1985)
- Eeran Sandhya (1985)
- Akalathe Ambili (1985)
- Adukkan Entheluppam (1986)
- Neeyethra Dhanya (1987)
- Ivide Ellavarkum Sukham (1987)
- Purappadu (1990)
- Sarovaram (1993)
- Sankeerthanam Pole (1997)

=== Actor ===
- Asthram(1983)
- Allahu Akbar(1977)
- Oru Sundariyude Katha (1972)...Georgekutty
- Kuttyedathi(1971)
- Gangaasangamam (1971)
- Manpeda (1971)
- Ernakulam Junction(1971)
- Jalakanyaka (1971)
- Rathrivandi (1971)
- Ara Nazhika Neram (1970)
- Nizhalattam (1970)
- Kallichellamma (1969)
- Adimakal (1969) .... Ananthan
- Ezhu Rathrikal (1968)
- Bhoomiyile Malakha (1965)

=== Screenplay ===
- Thaaraavu (1981)
- Shapamoksham (1974)
- Aswathy (1974)
- Azhimukham (1972)
- Bhoomiyile Malakha (1965)

=== Dialogue ===
- Shapamoksham (1974)
- Azhimukham (1972)
- Bhoomiyile Malakha (1965)

=== Story ===
- Agni Pushpam (1976)

== Tele films ==
- Mohapaskhikal
- Kuthirakal
