= Surveykkallu =

- Directed by: Thoppil Bhasi
- Written by: Thoppil Bhasi
- Starring: KPAC Lalitha; Lakshmi; Manavalan Joseph; Mohan Sharma
- Cinematography: U. Rajagopal
- Edited by: G. Venkittaraman
- Music by: G. Devarajan
- Production company: Chithramala
- Distributed by: Chithramala
- Release date: 2 July 1976
- Country: India
- Language: Malayalam

Surveykkallu is a 1976 Indian Malayalam film, directed by Thoppil Bhasi. The film stars KPAC Lalitha, Lakshmi, Manavalan Joseph and Mohan Sharma in the lead roles. The film has musical score by G. Devarajan.

== Cast ==
- Usharani
- Lakshmi
- Manavalan Joseph
- Mohan Sharma
- Sankaradi
- M. G. Soman

== Soundtrack ==
The music was composed by G. Devarajan and the lyrics were written by ONV Kurup.

No.	Song	Singers	Lyrics	Length (m:ss)
1	"Kanakathalikayil"	P. Madhuri	O. N. V. Kurup	
2	"Mandaakini"	K. J. Yesudas	O. N. V. Kurup	
3	"Poothumbi"	K. J. Yesudas, P. Madhuri	O. N. V. Kurup	
4	"Thenmalayude"	P. Jayachandran, P. Madhuri	O. N. V. Kurup	
5	"Vipanchike"	P. Madhuri	O. N. V. Kurup	
