= Dhruvasangamam =

- Theatrical release poster
- Directed by: J. Sasikumar
- Screenplay by: S. L. Puram Sadanandan
- Story by: Jessie Rasquinha
- Produced by: Jessie Rasquinha
- Starring: Sukumaran; Shubha; Mohanlal; Manavalan Joseph
- Cinematography: C. Ramachandra Menon
- Edited by: G. Murali
- Music by: Raveendran; Guna Singh (score)
- Production company: Velamkanni International Combines
- Distributed by: Munavar Films
- Release date: 14 August 1981
- Country: India
- Language: Malayalam

Dhruvasangamam (transl. Poles adjoin) is a 1981 Indian Malayalam-language drama film directed by J. Sasikumar and written by S. L. Puram Sadanandan from a story by Jessie Rasquinha who also produced the film. It stars Sukumaran, Shubha, Mohanlal, K. P. Ummer, and Manavalan Joseph. The film features songs composed by Raveendran and background score by Guna Singh.

== Plot ==
Twin brothers are separated in childhood after their father is murdered by a criminal gang. One grows up to become a brave and honest police officer, while the other, unknowingly raised within the criminal underworld, ends up working for the same gang that destroyed their family. During an investigation, the police officer discovers his twin and persuades him to infiltrate the gang. As the undercover brother learns the truth about his identity and past, the two join forces to bring down the syndicate. Their efforts lead to a final confrontation with the gang leader, resulting in justice for their father's death and a long-awaited reunion.

== Cast ==
- Sukumaran as Chandramohan
- Shubha as Rajalakshmi
- Mohanlal as Shankarankutty
- K. P. Ummer as Krishnadas
- Manavalan Joseph as Lambodhara Panikkar
- Alummoodan as Madhavapilla
- Kuthiravattam Pappu as Padma
- Meena as Doctor
- Reena as Valsala

== Soundtrack ==
The songs were composed by Raveendran and the lyrics were written by Sathyan Anthikkad.

No.	Song	Singers	Lyrics	Length
1	"Adharam Pakarum"	Lathika	Sathyan Anthikkad	
2	"Maanasa Devi"	K. J. Yesudas	Sathyan Anthikkad	
3	"Sharathkaala Megham"	K. J. Yesudas	Sathyan Anthikkad	
4	"Vanamaala Choodi"	K. J. Yesudas	Sathyan Anthikkad	
