= Akalangalil Abhayam =

- Directed by: Jeassy
- Written by: Kaloor Dennis; John Paul (dialogues)
- Screenplay by: John Paul
- Produced by: Joy Kuriakose; C. Chacko
- Starring: Madhu; Sheela; Sharada; Sukumaran; MG Soman
- Cinematography: Vipin Das
- Edited by: G. Venkittaraman
- Music by: G. Devarajan
- Production company: Mother India Movies
- Distributed by: Mother India Movies
- Release date: 16 May 1980
- Country: India
- Language: Malayalam

Akalangalil Abhayam is a 1980 Indian Malayalam film, directed by Jeassy and produced by Joy Kuriakose and C. Chacko. The film stars Madhu, Sheela, Sharada, MG Soman and Sukumaran in the lead roles. The film has musical score by G. Devarajan.

== Cast ==
- Madhu as Raghuraman
- Sheela as Savithri
- Sharada as Bharghavi aka Ammini
- Sukumaran as Unni
- Ambika as Yamuna
- M. G. Soman as Balachandran
- Sukumari as
- Manavalan Joseph as Apeksha Velu
- Sankaradi as Panikkar
- Justin
- Mala Aravindan as Sakshi Mathai
- Sadhana
- Veeran

== Soundtrack ==
The music was composed by G. Devarajan and the lyrics were written by R. K. Damodaran.

No.	Song	Singers	Lyrics	Length (m:ss)
1	"Kummattikkali Kaanan"	P. Madhuri	R. K. Damodaran	
2	"Mukhasree Vidarthunna"	K. J. Yesudas	R. K. Damodaran	
3	"Thiruvaikkathappa"	Vani Jairam	R. K. Damodaran	
