= Mucheettukalikkarante Makal (film) =

Mucheettukalikkaarante Makal
- Directed by: Thoppil Bhasi
- Written by: Vaikkom Muhammad Basheer; Thoppil Bhasi (dialogues)
- Screenplay by: Thoppil Bhasi
- Based on: "Mucheettukalikkarante Makal"
- Produced by: S. K. Nair
- Starring: Rani Chandra; Bahadoor; KPAC Lalitha; Adoor Bhasi; Manavalan Joseph; Alummoodan
- Cinematography: U. Rajagopal
- Edited by: G. Venkittaraman
- Music by: G. Devarajan
- Production company: Chithrasala
- Distributed by: Chithrasala
- Release date: 14 March 1975
- Country: India
- Language: Malayalam

Mucheettukalikkarante Makal is a 1975 Indian Malayalam film based on Vaikom Muhammad Basheer's story of the same name. The film is directed by Thoppil Bhasi, who also wrote the screenplay, and produced by S. K. Nair. It stars Rani Chandra, Bahadoor, KPAC Lalitha, Adoor Bhasi, Manavalan Joseph and Alummoodan in the lead roles. The film has musical score by G. Devarajan.

== Cast ==
- Rani Chandra as Sainaba
- M. G. Soman as Priest
- KPAC Lalitha as Kochu Thresia
- Adoor Bhasi as Ponkurishu Thoma
- Manavalan Joseph
- Alummoodan as Aanavari Raman Nair
- Bahadoor as Mandan Muthappa
- Bobby Kottarakkara
- Chandraji as Ottakannan Pokker
- Krishnamma
- Kunchan as Police
- Kuthiravattam Pappu as Kochu Thirumeni
- Paravoor Bharathan as Kaduva Mathan
- Prathapachandran as Police
- Oduvil Unnikrishanan as Police
- Thoppil Bhasi as Ettukali Mammoonj
- Muthukulam Raghavan Pilla as Palunkan
- Kollam GK Pilla

== Soundtrack ==
The music was composed by G. Devarajan and the lyrics were written by Vayalar.

No.	Song	Singers	Lyrics	Length (m:ss)
1	"Kudukudupaandippennu"	K. J. Yesudas	Vayalar	
2	"Mucheettukalikkana Mizhi"	P. Madhuri	Vayalar	
3	"Muthumethiyadiyitta"	P. Madhuri	Vayalar	
4	"Sangathiyarinjo"	Ayiroor Sadasivan, Manoharan	Vayalar	
