= Odakkuzhal (film) =

- Directed by: P. N. Menon
- Written by: N. P. Chellappan Nair; Sherif (dialogues)
- Screenplay by: P. N. Menon
- Produced by: M. P. Navakumar
- Starring: Sheela; Jose Prakash; P. J. Antony; Alummoodan
- Cinematography: Ashok Kumar
- Edited by: Ravi
- Music by: M. K. Arjunan
- Production company: Ratnagiri
- Distributed by: Ratnagiri
- Release date: 27 June 1975
- Country: India
- Language: Malayalam

Odakkuzhal is a 1975 Indian Malayalam-language film, directed by P. N. Menon and produced by M. P. Navakumar. The film stars Sheela, Jose Prakash, P. J. Antony and Alummoodan in the lead roles. The film has musical score by M. K. Arjunan.

== Cast ==
- Sheela
- Jose Prakash
- P. J. Antony
- Alummoodan
- Bahadoor
- Janardanan
- M. G. Soman
- Rani Chandra
- Master Sekhar

== Soundtrack ==
The music was composed by M. K. Arjunan with lyrics by Vayalar.

No.	Song	Singers	Lyrics	Length (m:ss)
1	"Dukhadevathe Unaroo"	S. Janaki	Vayalar	
2	"Manassum Maamsavum"	K. J. Yesudas	Vayalar	
3	"Naalillam Nalla Nadumuttam"	P. Jayachandran	Vayalar	
4	"Varnangal Vividha Vividha Varnangal"	K. J. Yesudas	Vayalar	
