= Lovely (1979 film) =

1979 film directed by N. Sankaran Nair

- Directed by: N. Sankaran Nair
- Written by: Sherif Kottarakkara; TV Gopalakrishnan (dialogues)
- Screenplay by: T. V. Gopalakrishnan
- Produced by: Sherif Kottarakkara
- Starring: M. G. Soman; Sukumaran; Sudheer; Lolitha
- Cinematography: Ashok Kumar
- Edited by: T. Sasikumar
- Music by: M. K. Arjunan
- Production company: Geetha Movies
- Distributed by: Geetha Movies
- Release date: 12 April 1979
- Country: India
- Language: Malayalam

Lovely is a 1979 Indian Malayalam-language film, directed by N. Sankaran Nair and produced by Sherif Kottarakkara. The film stars M. G. Soman, Sukumaran, Sudheer and Lolitha. The film was scored by M. K. Arjunan.

== Cast ==
- Thikkurissy Sukumaran Nair
- Kottayam Santha
- Krishnachandran
- Manavalan Joseph
- Paul Vengola
- Sukumaran
- Roopa Devi
- Baby Sumathi
- Baby Vengola
- Khadeeja
- Lolitha
- M. G. Soman
- R. S. Manohar
- P. K. Abraham
- Pala Thankam
- Sudheer

== Soundtrack ==
The music was composed by M. K. Arjunan and the lyrics were written by TV Gopalakrishnan.

No.	Song	Singers	Lyrics	Length (m:ss)
1	"Asthamanakkadalinte"	K. J. Yesudas, Jency	T. V. Gopalakrishnan	
2	"Ella Dukhavum Enikku"	K. J. Yesudas	T. V. Gopalakrishnan	
3	"Innathe Raathrikku"	S. Janaki	T. V. Gopalakrishnan	
4	"Raathri Sisira Raathri"	S. Janaki	T. V. Gopalakrishnan	
