= Puzha (film) =

- Directed by: Jeassy
- Written by: Pampadi Ramakrishnan; Sherif (dialogues)
- Screenplay by: Sherif
- Starring: Sukumari; Srividya; Manavalan Joseph; Sankaradi
- Cinematography: Vipin Das
- Edited by: G. Venkittaraman
- Music by: M. K. Arjunan
- Production company: Salkkala Films
- Distributed by: Salkkala Films
- Release date: 5 September 1980
- Country: India
- Language: Malayalam

Puzha is a 1980 Indian Malayalam film, directed by Jeassy. The film stars Sukumari, Srividya, Manavalan Joseph and Sankaradi in the lead roles. The film has a musical score by M. K. Arjunan.

== Cast ==
- M. G. Soman
- Ravikumar
- Alummoodan
- Manavalan Joseph
- Sankaradi
- Sukumari
- Srividya
- Ambika
- Meena
- Reena

== Soundtrack ==
The music was composed by M. K. Arjunan and the lyrics were written by P. Bhaskaran.

No.	Song	Singers	Lyrics	Length (m:ss)
1	"Anuvaadamillaathe Akathu Vannu"	K. J. Yesudas	P. Bhaskaran	
2	"Cheppadi Vidya Ithuverum"	K. J. Yesudas	P. Bhaskaran	
3	"Kizhakkonnu Thuduthal"	Vani Jairam	P. Bhaskaran	
4	"Thappo Thappo"	Vani Jairam	P. Bhaskaran	

== Accolades ==
- 1980 Filmfare Award for Best Actress – Malayalam – Srividya
