= Pavizha Mutthu =

- Directed by: Jeassy
- Written by: Sarah Thomas; Thoppil Bhasi (dialogues)
- Screenplay by: Thoppil Bhasi
- Produced by: Hari Pothan
- Starring: Sankaradi; Bahadoor; K. R. Vijaya; MG Soman
- Cinematography: Vipin Das
- Edited by: K. Narayanan
- Music by: G. Devarajan
- Production company: Supriya
- Distributed by: Supriya
- Release date: 7 March 1980
- Country: India
- Language: Malayalam

Pavizha Mutthu is a 1980 Indian Malayalam-language film, directed by Jeassy and produced by Hari Pothan. The film stars Sankaradi, Bahadoor, K. R. Vijaya and M. G. Soman. The film has musical score by G. Devarajan.

== Cast ==
- Sankaradi as Malathy's father
- Bahadoor as Joseph
- Prem Nazir as Dr. Rajan
- M. G. Soman as Raveendran
- Reena as Geetha
- Seema as Malathy
- Philomina as Kaliyamma
- Pala Thankam as Kalyani
- Janardhanan as Thomas
- Sukumari as Naaniyamma
- P. K. Abraham as Dr Mukundan (Rajans Father)
- Pratap K. Pothen as Santhosh
- K. R. Vijaya as Sindhu
- Vidhubala as Radha

== Soundtrack ==
The music was composed by G. Devarajan with lyrics by Kavalam Narayana Panicker.

No.	Song	Singers	Lyrics	Length (m:ss)
1	"Azhake Azhakin Azhake"	K. J. Yesudas	Kavalam Narayana Panicker	
2	"Chellam Chellam"	P. Madhuri	Kavalam Narayana Panicker	
3	"Kannal Mizhikalile"	K. J. Yesudas, P. Madhuri	Kavalam Narayana Panicker	
