= Kaanathaya Penkutty =

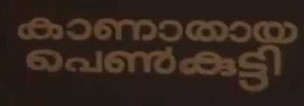
- Title of the Film
- Directed by: K. N. Sasidharan
- Written by: Babu Mathews
- Screenplay by: Babu Mathews
- Starring: Jayabharathi; Bharath Gopi; Mammootty; V. K. Sreeraman; Ramachandran
- Cinematography: V. Aravindakshan
- Edited by: Venugopal
- Music by: Jerry Amaldev
- Production company: Kuleena Movie Makers
- Distributed by: Kuleena Movie Makers
- Release date: 11 October 1985
- Country: India
- Language: Malayalam

Kaanathaya Penkutty is a 1985 Indian Malayalam mystery thriller film, directed by K. N. Sasidharan. The film follows the mystery of a missing girl, featuring Bharath Gopi, Jayabharathi, and Mammootty. Thilakan and Jagathy Sreekumar also appear in prominent roles, while Ramachandran and V. K. Sreeraman play the investigators. The film has musical score by Jerry Amaldev. The film was based on a true incident that happened in Thrissur in the year 1979 where a girl went missing and the same revealed the illegal relationship of her mother. It was Sasidharan's second film after Akkare (1984).

== Plot ==
Devadas Menon and wife Bhavani lodge a complaint at a local police station that their daughter Mini was missing since she left home for a school excursion and after their tour bus was involved in an accident. The police start the investigation and soon find the dead body of said girl near the local railway track passing through the village. Some half-burnt cigarettes and a matchbox were also found nearby. The police confirm it as a murder and that no evidence of rape or theft was found.

A nearby tea shop owner, the girl's presumed boyfriend, servant woman at the house and the girl's parents are questioned. After a reward of ₹ 5000 was announced for those who help find the culprit, Vasu, a local village guy, with his friend Abdu, confide to the police that they found the body first on the railway track and had moved it to the side, thinking that the girl was alive, when they returned drunk late at night. Following an anonymous phone call accusing Ram Mohan, a family friend, as guilty, he is also probed by police at his home, but could not be met. He was revealed to be a womanizer by his colleague.

Menon's statement that he was in Kollam for a business meet at the day of the crime was found to be dubious by the police. Menon had not been present at said hotel on that day. Police make a narrative that Menon was present at the machine house near his home throughout the day and himself killed the girl along with someone else, probably Ram Mohan. Menon remorsefully says that the narrative is half true and that he was hiding at the machine house because he doubted his wife's modesty. He was suspicious as to why his wife chose to grant the servant leave on a day her husband and daughter were absent. Hiding at the machine house, he saw Ram Mohan coming to his house and the wife waiting for him and decides to kill Ram Mohan. He went to fetch a pistol from his friend, but was unable to find it, and by then Ram Mohan's car was absent as he returned. Following this statement, police clear the mystery that the daughter might come back due to the unexpected accident and see her mother with Ram Mohan. For saving the trustworthiness and demureness towards her husband, she killed her daughter and called Ram Mohan for moving the body. Mohan came back and took the body to the railway track by his car and left it there. It was the cigarettes which he puffed seen near the spot. Following this, when Menon and police arrived at his house to interrogate Bhavani, she is seen shot by herself in the bedroom.

== Cast ==
- Jayabharathi as Bhavani
- Bharath Gopi as Devadas Menon
- Mammootty as Ram Mohan
- Jagathy Sreekumar as Vasu
- Thilakan as Constable Matthai
- Manavalan Joseph as tea shop owner Kuttettan
- Achankunju as Achankunju
- Alummoodan as Abdu
- V. K. Sreeraman as Circle Inspector Nambiar
- Ramachandran as S. P. Basheer
- Sandhya as Mini
- Sithara (Uncredited Role)

== Soundtrack ==
The music was composed by Jerry Amaldev and the lyrics were written by Sebastian Paul.

No.	Song	Singers	Lyrics	Length (m:ss)
1	"Chellam Chellam"	K. B. Sujatha, Preethi, Renuka, Elizabeth, Molly, Nadin	Sebastian Paul	
