= Shapamoksham =

- Directed by: Jesey
- Written by: Alappuzha Karthikeyan; Jesey (dialogues)
- Screenplay by: Jesey
- Produced by: Cartoonist Thomas
- Starring: Jayan; Sheela; Adoor Bhasi; Jose Prakash
- Edited by: K. Sankunni
- Music by: G. Devarajan
- Production company: Anaswara
- Distributed by: Anaswara
- Release date: 15 February 1974
- Country: India
- Language: Malayalam

Shapamoksham is a 1974 Indian Malayalam film, directed by Jesey and produced by Cartoonist Thomas. The film stars Jayan, Sheela, Adoor Bhasi and Jose Prakash in the lead roles. The film had musical score by G. Devarajan.This is the first movie of great actor Jayan.

== Cast ==
- Jayan
- Sheela
- Adoor Bhasi
- Jose Prakash
- Prasad
- Sreelatha Namboothiri
- Bahadoor
- Bindu Ramakrishnan
- K. P. Ummer
- Kuthiravattam Pappu
- Rani Chandra
- Sujatha

== Soundtrack ==
The music was composed by G. Devarajan and the lyrics were written by P. Bhaskaran.

| No. | Song | Singers | Lyrics | Length (m:ss) |
|---|---|---|---|---|
| 1 | "Aadyathe Raathriye Varavelkkaan" | K. J. Yesudas | P. Bhaskaran | |
| 2 | "Allimalar Thathe" | P. Madhuri, Ayiroor Sadasivan | P. Bhaskaran | |
| 3 | "Kalyaaniyaakum Ahalya" | P. Jayachandran, P. Madhuri | P. Bhaskaran | |
