= Aarum Anyaralla =

1978 film

- Directed by: Jesey
- Written by: Kanam E. J.
- Screenplay by: Kanam E. J.
- Starring: M. G. Soman; Jayabharathi; KPAC Lalitha; Adoor Bhasi
- Cinematography: Anandakuttan
- Edited by: G. Venkittaraman
- Music by: M. K. Arjunan
- Production company: JJ Productions
- Distributed by: JJ Productions
- Release date: 14 April 1978
- Country: India
- Language: Malayalam

Aarum Anyaralla is a 1978 Indian Malayalam-language film, directed by Jeassy. The film stars M. G. Soman, Jayabharathi, Sukumari and Adoor Bhasi. The film has musical score by M. K. Arjunan.

== Cast ==
- Sukumari
- Jayabharathi
- KPAC Lalitha
- Adoor Bhasi
- Sankaradi
- Adoor Bhavani
- Bahadoor
- Kuthiravattam Pappu
- M. G. Soman

== Soundtrack ==
The music was composed by M. K. Arjunan and the lyrics were written by Sathyan Anthikkad.

No.	Song	Singers	Lyrics	Length (m:ss)
1	"Ilaveyil Thalayilu Kinnaaram"	P. Jayachandran, C. O. Anto	Sathyan Anthikkad	
2	"Madhura Youvana Lahari"	Vani Jairam	Sathyan Anthikkad	
3	"Moham Mukhapadamaninju"	K. J. Yesudas	Sathyan Anthikkad	
4	"Thulasi Pookkum"	K. J. Yesudas	Sathyan Anthikkad	
