= Panchamrutham =

- Directed by: Baby
- Written by: Baby; S. L. Puram Sadanandan (dialogues)
- Produced by: A. Sherriff
- Starring: Jayan; Jayabharathi; Prem Nazir; Seema; Vidhubhala
- Cinematography: Dhanya
- Edited by: K. Sankunni
- Music by: [AT Ummer]
- Production company: Dhanya Enterprises
- Distributed by: Sree Murugalaya Films
- Release date: 9 January 1978
- Country: India
- Language: Malayalam
- Box office: Super Hit

Panchamrutham is a 1978 Indian Malayalam-language film, directed by Baby and produced by A.Sheriff. The film stars Jayan, Jayabharathi, Vidhubhala, Seema, Prem Nazir and Bhavani. The film's musical score was by A.T Ummer.

== Plot ==
Dr. Joseph Kuruvila and his wife adopted his sister's son, James, after the death of his parents. His daughter, Daniya Kuruvila, is deeply in love with James, but he considers her as a sister. James has a friend, Dr. Rajan, who is secretly in love with Daniya. Ramesh is also secretly loved by a servant in his house. Ramani also shows another story of James' other friend, Ravi and his lover Maya, who is a journalist.

When James is hired as the new MD of Kuruvilas' company, he falls in love with his new stenographer, Stella. At first she refuses his proposal because she is very poor and has to look after her family, which consists of her father, her cruel step-mother and her young step-sisters. She is the only earner in their family. James feels pity for her and decides to marry her, so he visits her house.

Daniya discovers this and becomes very angry and tells her father that she wants to marry James, but Kuruvila decides that James should marry Stella. Distraught with anger, Daniya decides to seek revenge. She secretly visits a woman skilled in black magic, Hidumbi, who gives her a necklace to give to Stella, which does not allow James and Stella to get intimate. Daniya gives the necklace to Stella as a gift.

James and Stella get married but on the first night she refuses to consummate their marriage, saying that she has a headache. One day everyone discovers that Joseph Kuruvila is in a coma but no one knows the reason. After several months, everyone in the family wonders why Stella is not yet pregnant. James' aunt tells him and Stella to visit the temple in Shimla so that everyone's wish will be satisfied.

James and Stella unwillingly visit the temple by order of the family. When they visit Shimla, Daniya plans to kill Stella by freezing her with ice. When they go for a walk, Daniya with the help of a black magician, traps Stella when she falls from a bridge and is frozen in an ice cage. The necklace that was given by Daniya is broken. James tries to rescue Stella by destroying the cage and takes Stella to a cottage. He tells the watcher of the cottage to call a doctor but the doctor's clinic is closed. With no help, James decides to save Stella from dying and remembers Rajans thoughts that their combined body temperature will reduce the cold and heats up another body by sexual contact. James decides to have sexual contact with Stella which saves her from dying.

After the necklace was broken, Stella too falls in love with James. Daniya becomes increasingly angry. The couple happily return from the temple. After several months, Stella gets pregnant which brings happiness to the whole family. Maya doubts Daniya and secretly observes her behaviour. One day, Daniya plans to kill Stella and the child by putting abortion pills and poison in Stella's orange juice. Stella has a miscarriage and everyone rushes her to the hospital. The doctor says that the child is dead and that Stella is also poisoned and on her deathbed. Rajan calls his friend, a poison specialist named Dr. Vinodh, who reaches Stella in time and saves her. Vinodh tells James that someone mixed poison in the drink. Everyone suspects the servant and Daniya dismisses the servant. Maya and Ravi say that they suspect Daniya, but no one believes them.

One day, Joseph Kuruvila tells everyone that Daniya is a mental patient who suffered from a psychic disorder at school and killed many people. She had paralyzed him by giving him an overdose of pills. James, Rajan and the others search for Stella but Daniya has taken her away to kill her. James finds them and rescues Stella. Rajan takes Daniya for treatment and she tells her whole story to him. When Daniya's treatment is over, everyone visits her but she is not there. They receive a letter written by Daniya that says that she is going to end her life. They find her at the top of a mountain. When she tries to jump, James rescues her but she tells him that she has killed many people and now realises her mistakes. She asks everyone for forgiveness and ends her life. Rajan marries Ramani after realising her love for him. Stella and James live happily. Maya and Ravi get married.

== Cast ==
- Jayan as James
- Jayabharathi as Stella
- Prem Nazir as Dr. Rajan
- Bhavani as Maya
- Ravikumar as Ravi
- Seema as Daniya Kuruvila
- Vidhubhala as Ramani
- Jose Prakash as Joseph Kuruvila
- Kaviyoor Ponnamma as Marykutty
- Kamalhassan in a guest appearance as Dr.Vinodh
- Sankaradi as Avarachan
- Meena as Mariamma
- Baby Sunathy as Young Daniya
- Jagathy Sreekumar as Watcher in Shimla

== Soundtrack ==
The music was composed by A.T Ummer with lyrics by Sreekumaran Thampi.

No.	Song	Singers	Lyrics	Length (m:ss)
1	"Kumkuma Sandhyakalo"	K.J Yesudas	Sreekumaran Thampi	
2	"Meghangal Thazhum"	K.J Yesudas, S.Janaki	Sreekumaran Thampi	
3	"Meghangal Thazhum"	K.J Yesudas	Sreekumaran Thampi	
4	"Vaadakaveedozhinju"	P. Susheela	Sreekumaran Thampi	
5	"Pranaya Kalahamo"	K. J. Yesudas	Sreekumaran Thampi	
