= Aswathy =

1974 Indian film directed by Jeassy

- Directed by: Jesey
- Written by: D. P. Nair; Sreevaraham Balakrishnan (dialogues)
- Screenplay by: Jesey
- Produced by: D. P. Nair
- Starring: Prem Nazir; Sheela; Adoor Bhasi; Manavalan Joseph
- Edited by: K. Sankunni
- Music by: V. Dakshinamoorthy
- Production company: Satheesh Movies
- Distributed by: Satheesh Movies
- Release date: 5 July 1974
- Country: India
- Language: Malayalam

Aswathy, also spelled Ashwathi, is a 1974 Indian Malayalam film, directed by Jesey and produced by D. P. Nair. The film stars Prem Nazir, Sheela, Adoor Bhasi and Manavalan Joseph in the lead roles. The film has musical score by V. Dakshinamoorthy.

== Cast ==
- Sheela
- Adoor Bhasi
- Manavalan Joseph
- Mohan Sharma
- Sankaradi
- Bahadoor
- K. P. Ummer
- Kuthiravattam Pappu
- Ushanandini

== Soundtrack ==
The music was composed by V. Dakshinamoorthy and the lyrics were written by P. Bhaskaran.

No.	Song	Singers	Lyrics	Length (m:ss)
1	"Chirikkoo Onnu Chirikkoo"	P. Susheela	P. Bhaskaran	
2	"Ente Sundaraswapna"	K. J. Yesudas	P. Bhaskaran	
3	"Kaavyapusthakamallo"	P. Jayachandran	P. Bhaskaran	
4	"Peraarin Theeratho"	K. J. Yesudas, S. Janaki	P. Bhaskaran	
