= Aval Viswasthayayirunnu =

1970 film

- Promotional poster designed by Kitho
- Directed by: Jeassy
- Written by: Kanam E. J.
- Produced by: J. J. Kuttikkattu
- Starring: M. G. Soman; Jayabharathi; Vincent; Kamal Haasan
- Cinematography: Vipindas
- Edited by: G. Venkittaraman
- Music by: M. K. Arjunan
- Production company: J. J. Productions
- Distributed by: Angel
- Release date: 25 March 1978
- Country: India
- Language: Malayalam

Aval Viswasthayayirunnu (transl. She was trustworthy) is a 1978 Indian Malayalam-language film, directed by Jeassy, starring M. G. Soman, Vincent and Jayabharathi. The film also has Kamal Haasan in a guest appearance.

== Plot ==
James, prefers to travel for work because it helps him cope with a heart break. His love Padmini had married someone else. James is transferred to a new place and he accidentally meets Johnny, his college mate. Johnny insists that James stay in his house where James meets Padmini, who is now the wife of Johnny. James accepts Johnny invite to stay at his house but he is not comfortable meeting and interacting with Padmini. He is also unable to leave the house due to Johnny's hospitality and affection.

Johnny's mother learns that Padmini was James's love, but she is doesn't blame Padmini for her past. Life becomes hell for James as well as Padmini as Johnny doesn't allow James to leave the house. But one day, Johnny learns of Padmini's past life. Keep watching to see if Johnny is able to accept James and Padmini's past.

== Cast ==
- M. G. Soman as James
- Vincent as Johnny
- Jayabharathi as Padmini
- Jose Prakash as Doctor
- Bahadoor
- Unnimary
- Sankaradi
- Adoor Bhasi as James' father
- Mallika Sukumaran
- Sreelatha Namboothiri as Johnny's house maid
- T. R. Omana as Johnny's mother
- Manavalan Joseph
- Kamal Haasan as College student (guest appearance)

== Production ==
Aval Viswasthayayirunnu film produced by J. J. Kuttikkattu under production banner J. J. Productions. Kamal Haasan plays a three-minute guest role as a college student who unsuccessfully tries to win over his lady love Unnimary. This film was shot in black-and-white. It was given an "U" (Unrestricted) certificate by the Central Board of Film Certification. The final length of the film was 3,572.24 metres (11,719.9 ft).

== Soundtrack ==
Aval Viswasthayayirunnu

Soundtrack album by M. K. Arjunan
- Genre: Feature film soundtrack
- Length: 8:48
- Language: Malayalam

The music was composed by M. K. Arjunan and the lyrics were written by Kanam E. J.

No.	Song	Singers	Lyrics	Length (m:ss)
1	"Chakravaalam Chaamaram"	K. J. Yesudas	Kanam E. J.	
2	"Pandu Pandoru Kurukkan"	Ambili	Kanam E. J.	
3	"Thirayum Theeravum"	Vani Jairam	Kanam E. J.	
4	"Thirayum Theeravum"	K. J. Yesudas	Kanam E. J.	
