= C. O. Anto =

Indian singer

- Born: Kochi, Kerala, India
- Genres: Playback singing, Carnatic music
- Occupation: Singer
- Instrument: Vocals
- Years active: 1963–2001
- Label: Audiotracs

C. O. Anto was an Indian film singer in Malayalam cinema during the 1960s and 1970s. His first film song was "Kummiyadikkuvin" for the movie Kadalamma in 1963. He sang 178 Malayalam songs for 160 films. His popular songs were "Madhurikkum Ormakale", "Kummiyadikkuvin", "Chingakkulirkatte Agnipushpam", "Kannillathoru Kadalppalam" (drama) and "Vasantharavin".

Anto received the Kerala Sangeetha Nataka Akademi Award in 1998 for his overall contribution to light music.

He died on 24 February 2001 due to age-related health issues.

== Filmography ==
=== As an actor ===
- Odayil Ninnu (1965)

=== Partial Discography ===
- Kummiyadikkuvin ... Kadalamma 1963
- Unnanam Uranganam ... Oraal Koodi Kallanaayi 1964
- Veedinu Ponmani ... Kudumbini 1964
- Thinthaare Thinthaare ... Kaattuthulasi 1965
- Pathupara Vithupaadu ... Inapraavukal 1965
- Padachavanundenkil ... Daaham 1965
- Kadukolam Theeyundengil ... Thirichadi 1968
- Kakkakkarumbikale ... Ezhu Raathrikal 1968
- Thedukayaanellaarum ... Pengal 1968
- Kunnathoru Kaavundu ... Asuravithu 1968
- Theyyam Theyyam ... Asuravithu 1968
- Kunkuma Maram Vetti ... Asuravithu 1968
- Panamoru Ballaatha ... Lakshaprabhu 1968
- Ice Cream ... Vidyaarthi 1968
- Pachilakkili ... Vidyaarthi 1968
- Sindabad ... Vidyaarthi 1968
- Bhoogolam Thiriyunnu ... Padunna Puzha 1968
- Amme Mahaakaaliyamme ... Love In Kerala 1968
- Madhurikkum ormakale
