= List of Malayalam films of 1979 =

The following is a list of Malayalam films released in the year 1979.

Opening		Sl. No.	Film	Cast	Director	Music director	Notes
J A N	5	1	Maalika Paniyunnavar	Sukumaran, Roja Ramani Mahendran	Sreekumaran Thampi	K. J. Yesudas	
J A N	12	2	Angakkuri	Jayan, Sukumaran, Jayabharathi	Vijayanand	A. T. Ummer	
J A N	13	3	Pancharathnam	Sudheer, Vincent, Ravikumar, Jose, Sathaar	Crossbelt Mani	KK Antony	
J A N	19	4	Raathrikal Ninakku Vendi	Jayan, Krishnachandran	Rochy Alex	A. T. Ummer	
J A N	25	5	Vaaleduthaven Vaalaal	Prem Nazir, Jose, Vidhubala	K. G. Rajasekharan	A. T. Ummer	
J A N	26	6	Ente Neelakaasham	Sukumaran, Shobha	Thoppil Bhasi	K. Raghavan	
J A N	26	7	Ezhunirangal	Jose, Vidhubala	Jeassy	G. Devarajan	
J A N	26	8	Pichathy Kuttappan	Prem Nazir, Jayan, Sarada, Sheela	P. Venu	K. Raghavan	
J A N	26	9	Hridayathil Nee Mathram	Sukumaran, Janardanan, Vidhubala	P. Govindan	A. T. Ummer	
J A N	26	10	Driver Madyapichirunnu	Sudheer, Prameela	S. K. Subhash	K. Raghavan	
F E B	2	11	Ival Oru Naadody	Sukumaran, Jayabharathi	P. Gopikumar	S. D. Sekhar	
F E B	3	12	Manushyan	Madhu, Kuthiravattam Pappu, Vidhubala	P. Ravindran	V. Dakshinamoorthy	
F E B	9	13	Anyarude Bhoomi	Chowalloor Krishnankutty, Nilambur Balan	Nilambur Balan	A. T. Ummer	
F E B	9	14	Kalliyankattu Neeli	Madhu, Jayabharathi	M. Krishnan Nair	Shyam	
F E B	9	15	Vadaka Veedu	Sukumaran, Anupama	Mohan	M. S. Viswanathan	
F E B	16	16	Amrutha Chumbanam	Raghavan, M. G. Soman, Vidhubala	P. Venu	G. Devarajan	
F E B	16	17	Avalude Prathikaram	Sudheer, Sathaar, Vijayalalitha	P. Venu	M. K. Arjunan	
F E B	23	18	Vellayani Paramu	Prem Nazir, Jayan	J. Sasikumar	G. Devarajan	
F E B	23	19	Veerabhadran	Sukumari, Hari, Ambika	N. Sankaran Nair	G. Devarajan	
M A R	2	20	Kaalam Kaathu Ninnilla	Prem Nazir, Jayabharathi	A. B. Raj	A. T. Ummer	
M A R	2	21	Sarapancharam	Jayan, Sheela	Hariharan	Devarajan	
M A R	16	22	Shudhikalasham	Madhu, Srividya	P. Chandrakumar	Shyam	
M A R	24	23	Thenthulli	Srividya, Sukumaran, Ravi Menon	K. P. Kumaran	K. Raghavan	
M A R	30	24	Kaumarapraayam	Krishnachandran, Anuradha	K. S. Gopalakrishnan	Shyam	
M A R	30	25	Kanalaattam		C. Radhakrishnan	A. T. Ummer	
M A R	30	26	Rakthamillatha Manushyan	M. G. Soman, Jayabharathi	Jeassy	M. K. Arjunan	
A P R	6	27	Sankhagaanam	Sreenivasan, Ramu Kariat	P. A. Bakker		
A P R	12	28	Irumbazhikal	Prem Nazir, Jayan	A. B. Raj	M. K. Arjunan	
A P R	12	29	Lovely	M. G. Soman, Sukumaran, Sudheer	N. Sankaran Nair	M. K. Arjunan	
A P R	14	30	Allauddinum Albhutha Vilakkum	Kamal Haasan, Rajinikanth	I. V. Sasi	G. Devarajan	
A P R	27	31	Enikku Njaan Swantham	Madhu, Shubha, Jagathy Sreekumar	P. Chandrakumar	Shyam	
A P R	27	32	Ente Sneham Ninakku Mathram	Sharada, Sukumaran, Jagathy Sreekumar	P. Sadhananthan	Shyam	
M A Y	3	33	Ajnaatha Theerangal	Raghavan, Vidhubala	M. Krishnan Nair	M. K. Arjunan	
M A Y	4	34	Itha Oru Theeram	M. G. Soman, Jayabharathi, Pappu	P. G. Vishwambharan	K. J. Joy	
M A Y	4	35	Anupallavi	Jayan, Ravikumar, Seema	Baby	K. J. Joy	
M A Y	4	36	Neelathamara	Ambika, Ravikumar	Yusuf Ali Kechery	Devarajan	
M A Y	4	37	Radha Enna Pennkutti	Jalaja, Sukumaran	Balachandra Menon	Shyam	
M A Y	13	38	Hridhayathinte Nirangal	Madhu, Jaya Pradha	P. Subramaniam	G. Devarajan	
M A Y	13	39	Mani Koya Kurup	K. P. Ummer, Padmapriya, Vincent,	S. S. Devadas	M. S. Viswanathan	
M A Y	15	40	College Beauty	Jayabharathi, Vincent	B. K. Pottekkad	M. S. Baburaj	
M A Y	25	41	Anubhavangale Nanni	Madhu, Jayabharathi	I. V. Sasi	G. Devarajan	
M A Y	28	42	Kannukal	Sukumaran, Jayabharathi	P. Gopikumar	V. Dakshinamoorthy	
M A Y	29	43	Avano Atho Avalo	Jayan, K. P. Ummer	Baby	M. K. Arjunan	
J U N	8	44	Nithya Vasantham	M. G. Soman, Vidhubala	J. Sasikumar	M. K. Arjunan	
J U N	8	45	Vijayam Nammude Senani	Jose, K. P. Ummer	K. G. Rajasekharan	Shankar–Ganesh	
J U N	29	46	Aval Niraparathi	Jose, Sudheer, Sathaar	M. Masthan	A. T. Ummer	
J U L	5	47	Vijayanum Veeranum	Prem Nazir, Seema	C. N. Venkita Swamy	A. T. Ummer	
J U L	6	48	Agni Vyooham	Sukumaran, Shubha	P. Chandrakumar	A. T. Ummer	
J U L	6	49	Nakshathrangale Sakshi	Jayabharathi, Shobha	Babu Radhakrishnan	K. J. Joy	
J U L	12	50	Kummatty	Ambalappuzha Ravunni, Ashok Unnikrishnan	G. Aravindan	M. G. Radhakrishnan	
J U L	13	51	Kayalum Kayarum	Madhu, Jayabharathi	K. S. Gopalakrishnan	K. V. Mahadevan	
J U L	20	52	Sayoojyam	Jayan, M. G. Soman, Jayabharathi, M. G. Soman	G. Premkumar	K. J. Joy	
A U G	3	53	Edavazhiyile Poocha Minda Poocha	Madhu, M. G. Soman, Srividya	Hariharan	M. B. Sreenivasan	
A U G	3	54	Yakshi Paaru	M. G. Soman, Sheela	K. G. Rajasekharan	M. K. Arjunan	
A U G	6	55	Peruvazhiyambalam	Ashokan, Bharath Gopi	Padmarajan	M. G. Radhakrishnan	
A U G	10	56	Manasa Vacha Karmana	M. G. Soman, Sukumaran, Jayabharathi	I. V. Sasi	A. T. Ummer	
A U G	10	57	Ormayil Nee Maathram	Prem Nazir, Jayabharathi	J. Sasikumar	G. Devarajan	
A U G	15	58	Venalil Oru Mazha	Madhu, Jayan	Sreekumaran Thampi	M. S. Viswanathan	
A U G	15	59	Mochanam	Jayan, Sukumaran	Thoppil Bhasi	G. Devarajan	
A U G	15	60	Ward No.7	Prem Nazir, Sharada	P. Venu	G. Devarajan	
A U G	15	61	Sukhathinte Pinnale	Jayabharathi, Sathaar	P. K. Joseph	K. J. Joy	
A U G	24	62	Maamaankam	Prem Nazir, Jayan	Navodaya Appachan	K. Raghavan	
A U G	31	63	Ezhamkadalinakkare	M. G. Soman, K. R. Vijaya	I. V. Sasi	M. S. Viswanathan	
A U G	31	64	Sarpam	Prem Nazir, Jayan	Baby	K. J. Joy	
S E P	1	65	Oru Raagam Pala Thaalam	Madhu, Jayan	M. Krishnan Nair	M. S. Viswanathan	
S E P	4	66	Chuvanna Chirakukal	Jayan, M. G. Soman, Jayabharathi	N. Sankaran Nair	Salil Chowdhary	
S E P	21	67	Manavadharmam	Prem Nazir, Vincent	J. Sasikumar	G. Devarajan	
S E P	21	68	Prabhu	Prem Nazir, Jayan	Baby	Shankar–Ganesh	
S E P	21	69	Choola	M. G. Soman, P. J. Antony	J. Sasikumar	Raveendran	
S E P	21	70	Jimmy	Prem Nazir (Guest role), Seema, Raghavan	Melattoor Ravi Varma	V. Dakshinamoorthy	
S E P	28	71	Pathivritha	Madhu, Sheela	M. S. Chakravarty	M. S. Viswanathan	
S E P	28	72	Thakara	Prathap Pothan, Surekha	Bharathan	M. G. Radhakrishnan	
O C T	5	73	Agniparvatham	Madhu, Srividya	P. Chandrakumar	Pukazhenthi	
O C T	5	74	Kochu Thampuratti	Cochin Haneefa, Sharmila	Rochy Alex	A. T. Ummer	
O C T	12	75	Puthiya Velicham	Jayan, Jayabharathi	Sreekumaran Thampi	Salil Chowdhary	
O C T	12	76	Ivide Kattinu Sugandam	Jayan, Jayabharathi	P. G. Vishwambharan	K. J. Joy	
O C T	19	77	Ponnil Kulicha Rathri	Vincent, Unnimary	Rochy Alex	A. T. Ummer	
O C T	26	78	Iniyethra Sandhyakal	Madhu, Jayabharathi	K. Sukumaran Nair	G. Devarajan	
O C T	26	79	Oolkatal	Venu Nagavally, Sobha	K. G. George	M. B. Sreenivasan	
O C T	26	80	Iniyathra	Srividya, Ravi Menon	Srini	Shyam	
O C T	26	81	Aadipaapam	Shubha, Sukumaran	K. P. Kumaran	Shyam	
O C T	26	82	Kathirmandapam	Prem Nazir, Madhu	K. P. Pillai	V. Dakshinamoorthy	
O C T	26	83	Ashwadhamavu	Ravi Menon, Vidhubala	K. R. Mohan		
O C T	29	84	Pennorumbettaal	Jayan, Jayabharathi	P. K. Joseph	Shankar–Ganesh	
N O V	2	85	Jeevitham Oru Gaanam	Madhu, Srividya	Sreekumaran Thampi	M. S. Viswanathan	
N O V	2	86	Pambaram	Prem Nazir, Bhavani	Baby	A. T. Ummer	
N O V	9	87	Pratheeksha	Madhu, Mohan Sharma	Chandrahasan	Salil Chowdhary	
N O V	9	88	Tharangam	Prem Nazir, K. R. Vijaya	Baby	K. J. Joy	
N O V	9	89	Lilly Pookkal	Sukumaran, Sobha	T. S. Mohan	Kottayam Joy	
N O V	9	90	Sandhya Raagam	Jayan, Sukumaran	P. Govindan	K. Raghavan	
N O V	12	91	Paapathinu Maranamilla	Thikkurissy Sukumaran Nair, Prameela	N. Sankaran Nair	G. Devarajan	
N O V	12	92	Manninte Maril	P. J. Antony, Kunjandi	P. A. Bakker	G. Devarajan	
N O V	16	93	Neeyo Njaano	M. G. Soman, Sukumaran	P. Chandrakumar	Shyam	
N O V	16	94	Pathinalaam Raavu	Ravi Menon, Urmila	Srini	K. Raghavan	
N O V	16	95	Iniyum Kaanaam	Prem Nazir, Ushakumari	Charles Ayyampally	M. S. Viswanathan	
N O V	16	96	Raajaveedhi	Raghavan, Ambika	Senan	A. T. Ummer	
N O V	19	97	Aavesham	Jayan, Sheela	Vijayanand	A. T. Ummer	
N O V	30	98	Kazhukan	Jayan, Shubha	A. B. Raj	M. K. Arjunan	
N O V	30	99	Prabhaathasandhya	Madhu, Srividya	P. Chandrakumar	Shyam	
N O V	30	100	Pushyaraagam	Madhu, Jayan	C. Radhakrishnan	A. T. Ummer	
D E C	7	101	Krishnapparunthu	Madhu, P. Jayachandran,	O. Ramdas	Shyam	
D E C	9	102	Lajjaavathi	Krishnachandran, Ambika	G. Premkumar	K. J. Joy	
D E C	14	103	Ishtapraaneshwari	Jose, Shobha	Sajan	Shyam	
D E C	14	103	Kallu Karthyayani	Jayan, Prameela	P. K. Joseph	A. T. Ummer	
D E C	21	104	Sikharangal	Jayan, Sheela	Sheela	K. J. Joy	
D E C	21	105	Aarattu	Shoma Anand, Jose	I. V. Sasi	A. T. Ummer	
D E C	21	106	Thuramukham	Sukumaran, M. G. Soman, Ambika	Jeassy	M. K. Arjunan	
			Indradhanussu	Prem Nazir, Jayabharathi, K. P. Ummer, Raghavan	K. G. Rajasekharan		
			Njattadi	Murali, Girija	Barath Gopi		
			Surya Daham				

== Dubbed films ==
Movie	Year	Direction	Story	Screenplay	Main Actors
Ullaasa Jodi	1979	Babu
