= Manushya Mrugam =

Manushya Mrugam (lit. 'Animal Man') may refer to:

- Manushya Mrugam (1980 film), an Indian Malayalam film
- Manushyamrugam, a 2011 Indian Malayalam-language mystery film
