= Angadi (film) =

- Directed by: I. V. Sasi
- Written by: T. Damodaran
- Produced by: P. V. Gangadharan
- Starring: Jayan; Seema; Sukumaran
- Cinematography: Chandramohan; C. E. Babu
- Edited by: K. Narayanan
- Music by: Shyam
- Production company: Grihalakshmi Productions
- Distributed by: Kalpaka Films Release
- Release date: 18 April 1980
- Running time: 165 minutes
- Country: India
- Language: Malayalam

Angadi (transl. Market) is a 1980 Indian Malayalam-language action drama film directed by I. V. Sasi, written by T. Damodaran and produced by P. V, Gangadharan under the banner of Grihalakshmi Productions. The film stars Jayan as Babu in the lead role along with Sukumaran, Seema, Jose and Sankaradi, in supporting roles. The film revolves around the rivalry between a laborer, Babu and Beeran (Balan K. Nair), an evil businessman. The music was composed by Shyam, with the cinematography done jointly by Chandramohan and C. E. Babu. Angadi was one of the major successes of the year 1980, running for 125 days in theatres. The film broke the box office record of Jayan's Sarapancharam (1979) and emerged the highest grossing Malayalam film of the year. The film was a milestone in the Malayalam film industry, achieving cult status in Kerala. The film was instrumental in establishing Jayan's macho hero image.

== Cast ==
- Jayan as Babu
- Sukumaran as Gopi
- Seema as Sindhu
- Jose as Haneefa
- Sankaradi as Adv. Karunakaran
- Raghavan as SI Ravi
- Prathapachandran as Setu
- Ambika as Ayisha
- Balan K. Nair as Beeran
- Bhaskara Kurup as Police constable Hamsa
- KPAC Sunny as Vishvanathan
- Kunchan as Krishnankutty
- Kunjandi as Mammadikka
- Kuthiravattam Pappu as Abu
- Kuttyedathi Vilasini as Khadeeja
- Nanditha Bose as Neelam
- Ravikumar as Biju
- Santha Devi as Amina
- Suchitra as Rani
- Surekha as Karthi
- Vasu Pradeep as Salim, Babu's father
- Nellikode Bhaskaran as Anto
- Anuradha as Dancer
- Silk Smitha as Sainaba
- Master Suresh as Haneefa's brother

== Soundtrack ==
The music was composed by Shyam and the lyrics were written by Bichu Thirumala.

No.	Song	Singers	Lyrics	Length
1	"Allaane Umma" (Bit)	K. J. Yesudas	Bichu Thirumala	
2	"Kannippalunke Ponninkinaave"	P. Susheela, Chorus	Bichu Thirumala	4:38
3	"Kannum Kannum Thammil"	K. J. Yesudas, S. Janaki	Bichu Thirumala	4:54
4	"Life Is Just Like"	S. Janaki, Jomon	Bichu Thirumala	
5	"Onavillin Thaalavum"	Vani Jairam	Bichu Thirumala	4:40
6	"Paavaada Venam Melaada Venam"	K. J. Yesudas	Bichu Thirumala	3:58

== Reception ==
Angadi performed well at the box office. It was also noted for Jayan's acting. His dialogue "We are not beggars ..." became a catchphrase.

The songs from the film also made it big for their melodious renditions. With the music composed by Shyam, the film's duet, "Kannum Kannum Thammil Thammil", sung by K. J. Yesudas and S. Janaki and "Paavada Venam", sung by K. J Yesudas were instant hits. The lyrics by Bichu Thirumala was also very memorable.
