= Jayikkaanaay Janichavan =

- Directed by: J. Sasikumar
- Written by: M. P. Rajeevan; Sreekumaran Thampi (dialogues)
- Screenplay by: Sreekumaran Thampi
- Produced by: Sreekumaran Thampi
- Starring: Prem Nazir; M. G. Soman; Jayan; Sheela; Jagathy Sreekumar
- Cinematography: Ashok Kumar
- Edited by: K. Sankunni
- Music by: M. K. Arjunan
- Production company: Bhavani Rajeswari
- Distributed by: Bhavani Rajeswari
- Release date: 17 December 1978
- Country: India
- Language: Malayalam

Jayikkaanaay Janichavan is a 1978 Indian Malayalam-language film, directed by J. Sasikumar and produced by Sreekumaran Thampi. The film stars Prem Nazir, M. G. Soman, Jayan, Sheela and Jagathy Sreekumar. The film has musical score by M. K. Arjunan.

== Cast ==
- Prem Nazir as Minnal Raju
- Jayan as Prabhakara Varma
- Sheela as Lakshmi
- Jagathy Sreekumar as Sulaiman
- KPAC Lalitha as Kalyani
- Adoor Bhasi as Tharakan
- Thikkurissy Sukumaran Nair as Malarthu Unnunni
- Manavalan Joseph as Udaya Varma
- Sreelatha Namboothiri as Marykutty
- Sreenivasan as Singer in a song
- Prathapachandran as Ananda Varma
- M. G. Soman as Vaasu
- Mallika Sukumaran as Rani
- Thodupuzha Radhakrishnan as Chellappan
- Vallathol Unnikrishnan as Raman Jyothsyar
- Philomina as Kalyani's Aunt
- Maniyanpilla Raju as Tharakan's sidekick
- Haripad Soman as Union secretary
- P. Sreekumar
- Miss Vang as Miss Vang Karate Master
- Master Rajakumaran Thampi as Young Raju
- Manjeri Chandran as Prabhakaran's sidekick
- Shanthan
- Rajan as Bharani
- Ramji
- Aravindakshan
- Ushile Mani

== Soundtrack ==
The music was composed by M. K. Arjunan and the lyrics were written by Sreekumaran Thampi.

No.	Song	Singers	Lyrics	Length (m:ss)
1	"Allaavin Thirusabhayil"	Jolly Abraham, Mannur Rajakumaranunni	Sreekumaran Thampi	
2	"Arayaal Mandapam"	K. J. Yesudas	Sreekumaran Thampi	
3	"Chaalakkambolathil"	P. Jayachandran	Sreekumaran Thampi	
4	"Devi Mahaamaaye" (Aalavattam Venchamaram)	P. Jayachandran, Ambili, Chorus	Sreekumaran Thampi	
5	"Ezhu Swarangal"	K. J. Yesudas	Sreekumaran Thampi	
6	"Kaavadichinthu Paadi"	K. J. Yesudas, B. Vasantha	Sreekumaran Thampi	
7	"Thankam Kondoru"	Ambili, Chorus, Jolly Abraham	Sreekumaran Thampi	

== view the film ==
- Jayikkanaayi Janichavan on YouTube
