= Garjanai =

- Theatrical release poster in Tamil
- Directed by: C. V. Rajendran
- Written by: Panchu Arunachalam (Tamil dialogues); Chi. Udayashankar (Kannada dialogues)
- Screenplay by: C. V. Rajendran
- Story by: Gollapudi Maruti Rao
- Produced by: Ram Kishen; Ramakrishnan; Giridharlal Chand; Ramchand
- Starring: Rajinikanth; Madhavi; Geetha
- Cinematography: Jayanan Vincent
- Edited by: R. G. Gopu
- Music by: Ilaiyaraaja
- Production company: Hem Nag Films
- Release dates: 7 August 1981 (Tamil); 14 August 1981 (Malayalam); 23 October 1981 (Kannada)
- Running time: 124 minutes
- Country: India
- Languages: Tamil; Malayalam; Kannada

Garjanai (transl. Roar) is a 1981 Indian Tamil-language film directed by C. V. Rajendran, starring Rajinikanth and Madhavi. The music was scored by Ilaiyaraaja. The film was simultaneously shot in Malayalam as Garjanam and in Kannada as Garjane. All three versions of the film failed at the box office. Garjanai ran for 52 days in Chennai making it one of Rajinikanth's films with the shortest run in theatres. It marked Rajinikanth's last Malayalam and Kannada film role till date.

== Plot ==
Dr. Vijay is an honest doctor who confronts a dangerous, diabolical gang led by Dr. Mithra and Parasuram. The gang contaminates common food items with lethal substances and profits by supplying antidotes. Geetha is Vijay's love interest, while Rekha is his sister.

== Cast ==
| Cast (Tamil) | Cast (Kannada) | Role |
|---|---|---|
| Rajinikanth | | Dr. Vijay, M.B.B.S. |
| Madhavi | | Geetha |
| Jaishankar | Thoogudeepa Srinivas | Parasuram |
| M. N. Nambiar | Sudheer | Mr. Mithra |
| Mohan Babu (Uncredited) | Sudheer | |
| Major Sundarrajan | Udaykumar | D. C. P. |
| Thengai Srinivasan | Dwarakish | Sivalingam (Tamil)/ Maadappa (Kannada) |
| V. K. Ramasamy | Shivaram | Sundaram |
| Poornam Viswanathan | Shakti Prasad | Prof. Jaidev |
| Shanawas | Jai Jagadish | Murali |
| Geetha | | Rekha |
| Sukumari | Leelavathi | Vijay and Rekha's mother |
| Baby Anju | | Asha |
| Upasane Seetharam | | Vishwanathan (Tamil)/ Vishwanath (Kannada) |
| Jayamalini | | Special Appearance in the song "Vanthathu Nallathu" (Tamil)/ "Bandeya Bandeya" (Kannada) |

Malayalam version

- Rajinikanth as Dr. Vijay, M.B.B.S.
- Madhavi as Geetha
- Geetha as Rekha
- Balan K. Nair
- Kuthiravattam Pappu
- Sukumari as Vijay and Rekha's mother
- Shanawas as Murali
- Ravikumar
- Prathapachandran
- Poojappura Ravi
- Meena Das
- Jayamalini
- Rekha
- P. K. Abraham
- Jayanthi
- Jose Prakash
- Suchitra
- Baby Anju as Asha
- Jayan (special appearance)
- Jayamalini (special appearance in the song "Vannathu Nallathu Nalla Dinam")

== Production ==
All three versions were filmed simultaneously. Jayan was the original lead actor of Garjanam, the Malayalam version. While half the film had been shot, he suffered an accident while filming another film, Kolilakkam and succumbed to his injuries. Subsequently, Garjanam was completed with Rajinikanth in the same role. Some footage of Jayan was included in the film's opening reel, before the credits, during screenings in Kerala. During the filming of another fight sequence, a stuntman sustained a gash after punching glass, which led to hospitalisation.

== Soundtrack ==
Tamil
| No. | Title | Lyrics | Singer(s) | Length |
|---|---|---|---|---|
| 1. | "Oru Ooril" | Kannadasan | Malaysia Vasudevan | 4:27 |
| 2. | "Enna Sugamana" | Panchu Arunachalam | Malaysia Vasudevan, Uma Ramanan | 4:41 |
| 3. | "Kuththum Oosi" | Kannadasan | Vani Jairam | 4:09 |
| 4. | "Vanthathu Nallathu" | Kannadasan | S. Janaki, S. P. Balasubrahmanyam | 4:46 |
| 5. | "Varuvai Anbe" | Panchu Arunachalam | T. K. S. Kalaivanan, S. Janaki | 5:04 |

All lyrics are written by Sreekumaran Thampi.

Malayalam
| No. | Title | Singer(s) | Length |
|---|---|---|---|
| 1. | "Ente Pularkaalam" | S. Janaki, P. Jayachandran |
| 2. | "Oru Mohathin" | S. Janaki, P. Jayachandran |
| 3. | "Oru Theril" | P. Jayachandran, Chorus |
| 4. | "Pennin Kannil Viriyum" | Vani Jairam |
| 5. | "Thamburaatti Nin Kottaarathil" | P. Jayachandran |
| 6. | "Vannathu Nallathu Nalla Dinam" | S. Janaki, P. Jayachandran, Chorus |

Kannada
| No. | Title | Singer(s) | Length |
|---|---|---|---|
| 1. | "Bandeya Bandeya" | S. P. Balasubrahmanyam, S. Janaki | 4:46 |
| 2. | "Hithavagidhe" | P. Jayachandran, S. Janaki | 5:02 |
| 3. | "Kanna Minchinda" | S. P. Balasubrahmanyam, S. Janaki | 4:40 |
| 4. | "Nadevaga" | S. P. Balasubrahmanyam | 4:25 |
| 5. | "Nanna Roopa" | Vani Jairam | 3:49 |

== Reception ==
Sindhu and Jeeva, in their negative review of the film for Kalki, referred to it as a "meow" rather than the "roar" implied by the films title.
