= Kalliyankattu Neeli (film) =

Kalliyankatu Neeli
- Poster
- Directed by: M. Krishnan Nair
- Written by: Jagathy N. K. Achary
- Screenplay by: Jagathy N. K. Achary
- Produced by: M. Mani
- Starring: Madhu; Jayabharathi; Jagathy Sreekumar; Sudheer; Praveena
- Cinematography: Bala Sundaram
- Edited by: K. P. Puthran
- Music by: Shyam; Lyrics: Bichu Thirumala
- Production company: Sunitha Productions
- Distributed by: Sunitha Productions
- Release date: 9 February 1979
- Country: India
- Language: Malayalam

Kalliyankattu Neeli is a 1979 Indian Malayalam-language horror film, directed by M. Krishnan Nair and produced by M. Mani. The film stars Madhu, Jayabharathi, Jagathy Sreekumar and Sudheer in the lead roles. The film has musical score by Shyam.

== Plot ==
The plot of Kalliyankattu Neeli centers on the mysterious Kalliyankattu forest, which is haunted by the legend of a vengeful Yakshi named Neeli who is believed to prey on men. The story begins when the poet Hemachandran arrives at a local tourist bungalow and intervenes to save a young woman named Latha from a suicide attempt. As Hemachandran grows closer to Latha and seeks to protect her from her oppressive family and the aggressive Govindan, he becomes entangled in a series of unexplained deaths that the local police, led by a skeptical SI, initially struggle to solve. While the villagers live in terror of the supernatural, the investigation ultimately reveals that the hauntings are a calculated ruse; a criminal syndicate has been exploiting local superstitions to conduct smuggling operations, even using Latha's sister— who was found severely injured—as a pawn through psychological conditioning to pose as the entity.The film concludes as this elaborate facade of horror is shattered, exposing the underlying greed and human criminality responsible for the forest's dark reputation.

== Cast ==
- Madhu as Hemachandran
- Jayabharathi as Latha, Latha's sister (disguised as Neeli) double role
- Sudheer as Neelamma's husband
- Jagathy Sreekumar as Ugran Vaasu
- Manavalan Joseph as Watcher Velappan Pillai
- Praveena as Neelamma
- Mancheri Chandran as Sunny
- Adoor Bhavani as Gouriyamma
- Aryad Gopalakrishnan as Govindan
- Noohu as Shankari
- Paravoor Bharathan as Suryakaladi Bhattadiri
- Pushpa as Dolly
- T. P. Madhavan as Hippie
- Veeran as Settu

== Soundtrack ==
All lyrics are written by Bichu Thirumala; all music is composed by Shyam.

Track listing
No.	Title	Artist(s)	Length
1.	"Nizhalaay Ozhukivarum"	S. Janaki
2.	"Om Raktha Chaamundeshwari"	K. J. Yesudas, Choir
3.	"Swarnam Menja"	K. J. Yesudas
