= Benz Vasu =

- Directed by: Hassan
- Written by: Hassan
- Screenplay by: Vijayan Karote
- Produced by: Hassan
- Starring: Jayan; Seema; Pattom Sadan; Sankaradi; Sreelatha Namboothiri
- Cinematography: J. Williams
- Edited by: K. Sankunni
- Music by: A. T. Ummer
- Production company: Arifa Enterprises
- Distributed by: Arifa Enterprises
- Release date: 11 April 1980
- Country: India
- Language: Malayalam

Benz Vasu is a 1980 Indian Malayalam film, directed and produced by Hassan. The film stars Jayan, Pattom Sadan, Sankaradi and Sreelatha Namboothiri in the lead roles. The film has musical score by A. T. Ummer.

== Plot ==
Vasu is a petty criminal who inherits a small garage from his friend Varkey. His efforts turn it into a profitable business and he's now a prominent businessman referred to as Benz Vasu. He's still traumatized by the murder of his adulterous mother by the hand of his father. However he begins to change his mind as he runs across Malathi, a poor girl. When he realises that Malathi is in fact in love with Madhu one of his own employees, Vasu makes plans to separate the couple and win Malathi for himself. However it turns out to be fruitless and Madhu and Malathi marry each other. Meanwhile, Madhu is not popular with the other employees as he stops them fleecing their boss, Vasu. The employees plan to murder Madhu without Vasu's knowledge.

== Cast ==
- Jayan as Vasu
- Seema as Malathi
- Pattom Sadan
- Sankaradi as Raghavan
- Sreelatha Namboothiri as Stella
- Cochin Haneefa as Thoma
- Paul Vengola
- Prathapachandran as Vasu's Father
- Sathaar as Madhu
- Balan K. Nair as Varkey
- Kuthiravattam Pappu as Pappu
- Priya (Sarapancharam actress)
- Raji
- Vanchiyoor Radha

== Soundtrack ==
The music was composed by A. T. Ummer and the lyrics were written by B. Manikyam.

No.	Song	Singers	Lyrics	Length (m:ss)
1	"Palissakaaran Pathrose"	P. Jayachandran	B. Manikyam	
2	"Pournamippenne"	K. J. Yesudas	B. Manikyam	
3	"Ragaraga Pakshi"	S. Janaki	B. Manikyam	
4	"Swapnam Swayamvaramaayi"	K. J. Yesudas, S. Janaki	B. Manikyam	
