= Sakthi (1980 film) =

- Directed by: Vijayanand
- Written by: Bichu Thirumala
- Screenplay by: Vijayanand
- Produced by: Raghu Kumar
- Starring: Jayan; Seema; M. N. Nambiar; Srividya; Ravikumar
- Cinematography: Anandakkuttan
- Edited by: M. Umanath; M. Mani
- Music by: K. J. Joy
- Production company: Sudheera Enterprises
- Distributed by: Sudheera Enterprises
- Release date: 22 August 1980
- Country: India
- Language: Malayalam

Shakthi is a 1980 Indian Malayalam film, directed by Vijayanand and produced by Raghu Kumar. The film stars Jayan, Seema, Srividya and Jagathy Sreekumar in the lead roles. The film has a musical score by K. J. Joy. Many scenes of the movie were inspired from 1976 Amitabh Bachan's Hindi film Deewar and the 1979 film Kala Pathar meanwhile those scenes copied from Hollywood. The climax mirror fight sequence was inspired by the 1973 Bruce Lee film Enter the Dragon. The movie was on the hit chart.

== Cast ==
- Jayan as Vijayan / Rajan Varma
- Seema as Revathi
- M. N. Nambiar as Vikraman
- Ravikumar as Vinod
- Srividya as Dr. G. Malathi
- Bahadur as Paramu Pillai
- Prathapachandran as Prathap
- Jagathi Sreekumar as Thilakan
- Jose Prakash as Sreedharan
- Kanakadurga as Madhavi
- T. P. Madhavan as Michael
- Manavalan Joseph
- Sathaar as Malathi's Husband
- Krishnachandran as Blind Person
- Oduvil Unnikrishnan as Man at the Toddy Shop
- Poojappura Ravi as Man at the Toddy Shop
- Kunchan as Man at the Toddy Shop
- Ceylon Manohar as Nagappan
- Cochin Hanifa as Khader

== Soundtrack ==
The music was composed by K. J. Joy and the lyrics were written by Bichu Thirumala.

| No. | Song | Singers | Length (m:ss) |
|---|---|---|---|
| 1 | "Chandana Shilakalil" | P. Susheela, P. Jayachandran | |
| 2 | "Evideyo Kalanju Poya" | K. J. Yesudas | |
| 3 | "Meesha Mulachappol" | K. J. Yesudas, Gopan, K. P. Chandramohan, Ganesh | |
| 4 | "Mizhiyilennum Nee Choodum" | S. Janaki, Gopan | |
| 5 | "Thennale Thoomanam Thooki Vaa" | S. Janaki | |

== See also ==
- List of Malayalam horror films
