= Pick Pocket (1976 film) =

- Directed by: J. Sasikumar
- Written by: Pappanamkodu Lakshmanan
- Screenplay by: Pappanamkodu Lakshmanan
- Produced by: E.P Abraham
- Starring: Prem Nazir; Jayan; Adoor Bhasi; Sankaradi
- Cinematography: P.B. Mani
- Edited by: V. P. Krishnan
- Music by: M. K. Arjunan
- Release date: 29 October 1976
- Country: India
- Language: Malayalam

Pick Pocket is a 1976 Indian Malayalam-language film directed by J. Sasikumar. The film stars Prem Nazir, Jayan, Adoor Bhasi and Sankaradi. The film's score was composed by M. K. Arjunan.

== Cast ==
- Prem Nazir as Chandran
- Jayan as Chandran's father
- Adoor Bhasi as Achu
- Sankaradi as Krishna Kurup
- Sreelatha Namboothiri as Soudamini
- Kanakadurga as Madhavikutty/ Gourimatha
- M. G. Soman as Damu
- Meena as Panchali
- Vidhubala as Reena
- Master Raghu as Young Achu
- P. R. Menon as Suresh's father
- Alummoodan as Sankaran Nair
- Vanchiyoor Radha as Madhavi
- Paravoor Bharathan as Mathai
- V. D. Rajappan as Suresh
- Kollam G. K. Pillai as Kuttappan
- Radhika as Ammini
- Kuttichathan Purushan as Chundeli

== Soundtrack ==
The music was composed by M. K. Arjunan with lyrics by Pappanamkodu Lakshmanan.

No.	Song	Singers	Lyrics	Length (m:ss)
1	"Bhoomikku Burmma Vakkum"	P. Jayachandran, Pattom Sadan	Pappanamkodu Lakshmanan	
2	"Kanmunayil"	K. J. Yesudas	Pappanamkodu Lakshmanan	
3	"Manushyaputhranmaare"	K. J. Yesudas	Pappanamkodu Lakshmanan	
4	"Pazhanimalakkovilile"	P. Jayachandran, Chorus	Pappanamkodu Lakshmanan	
5	"Swapnahaaramaninjethum"	P. Jayachandran, Vani Jairam	Pappanamkodu Lakshmanan	
