= Kayalum Kayarum =

- Directed by: K. S. Gopalakrishnan
- Written by: K. S. Gopalakrishnan; Vijayan Karote (dialogues)
- Screenplay by: Vijayan Karote
- Produced by: M. S. Sivaswami
- Starring: Madhu; Jayabharathi; Mohan Sharma; KPAC Lalitha
- Cinematography: Vipin Das
- Edited by: K. Sankunni
- Music by: K. V. Mahadevan
- Production company: Mukundan Pictures
- Distributed by: Mukundan Pictures
- Release date: 13 July 1979
- Country: India
- Language: Malayalam

Kayalum Kayarum is a 1979 Indian Malayalam film, directed by K. S. Gopalakrishnan and produced by M. S. Sivaswami. The film stars Madhu, Jayabharathi, Mohan Sharma and KPAC Lalitha in the lead roles. The film has musical score by K. V. Mahadevan.

== Cast ==
- Madhu as Chellappan
- Jayabharathi as Jaanu
- Mohan Sharma as Raghavan
- KPAC Lalitha as Panki
- P. C. George as Gunda
- Adoor Bhavani as Devaki
- Anandavally as Daisy
- K. P. A. C. Azeez as Kaduva Narayanan
- Bahadoor as Vasu Pillechan
- KPAC Sunny as Johnny
- Kottarakkara Sreedharan Nair as Raghavan's father
- Kuthiravattam Pappu as Purushu
- Nellikode Bhaskaran as Aadurahuman
- Vanchiyoor Madhavan Nair as Joseph Muthalali
- Vanchiyoor Radha as Meenakshi

== Soundtrack ==
The music was composed by K. V. Mahadevan and the lyrics were written by Poovachal Khader. The songs in this film were chartbusters, and are still popular in Kerala.

No.	Song	Singers	Lyrics	Length (m:ss)
1	"Chithirathoniyil"	K. J. Yesudas	Poovachal Khader	
2	"Ilam Neelamaanam Kathir"	K. J. Yesudas, P. Susheela	Poovachal Khader	
3	"Kadakkanniloru Kadal Kandu"	Vani Jairam	Poovachal Khader	
4	"Raamayanathile Dukham"	N. V. Haridas	Poovachal Khader	
5	"Shararaanthal Thirithaanu"	K. J. Yesudas	Poovachal Khader	
