= Angakkuri =

1979 film

- Directed by: Vijayanand
- Written by: Pappanamkodu Lakshmanan (dialogues)
- Screenplay by: C. V. Hariharan
- Produced by: C. V. Hariharan
- Starring: Jayan; Jayabharathi; Sukumaran; Seema
- Cinematography: Anandakuttan
- Edited by: Vijayanand
- Music by: A. T. Ummer; Lyrics: Bichu Thirumala
- Production company: Murali Movies
- Distributed by: Murali Movies
- Release date: 12 January 1979
- Country: India
- Language: Malayalam

Angakkuri is a 1979 Indian Malayalam film, directed by Vijayanand and produced by C. V. Hariharan. The film stars Jayan, Jayabharathi, Sukumaran and Seema. The score was composed by A. T. Ummer. The movie is a remake of the 1979 Kannada movie Sneha Sedu.

== Plot ==
The protagonist Ramachandran returns from jail and kills his corrupt senior employee Balagangadaran, who had implicated him in a criminal case that destroyed his family. He abducts the victim's daughter, Sarala, and hands her over to a brothel, where she becomes a prostitute.

He shifts to a new location, assumes the name Ramankutty, and becomes a criminal. There he befriends taxi-driver Balakrishnan, without realizing that he is Sarala's brother and the son of the man Ramachandran murdered. Each man is searching for his enemy, little knowing that it is his best friend. Ramankutty comes to know that Krishnan's fiancée Geetha is the daughter of the younger sister of his mother. Thampi, who is a smuggler, tries to confiscate the land of the poor people, demanding two lakhs he knows they cannot pay.

Ramachandran brings the money and settles him. Thampi fails to obtain the property and discovers that the money is actually his and had been stolen by Ramankutty, plans revenge. He finds out the whereabouts of Sarala and brings her on the day of Geetha and Krishnan's marriage. At the marriage place, Sarala revels that Ramankutty is Ramachandran and he is the reason she rents herself. Thampi arrives and captures Geetha and Sarala. Krishnan and Ramachandran join hands and win over Thampi, rescue the girls, and hand Thamphi to the police.

Ramachandran surrenders to the police by admitting his guilt of killing Balagangadaran; father of Krishnan and Sarala. Ramachandran hits his head with a rock, his blood dripping on Sarala's face and promise that he will return after his sentence to marry Sarala. Sarala forgives him. The police arrests Ramachandran in the end.

== Cast ==
- Jayan as Ramachandran/Ramankutty
- Jayabharathi as Geetha
- Sukumaran as Balakrishnan
- Seema as Sarala
- Sankaradi as Gopalan, Ramachandran's uncle
- Prathapachandran as Balagangadaran, Krishnan's and Sarala's father
- K. P. Ummer as Thambi
- Kunchan as Dasappan
- Kuthiravattam Pappu as Kochappan
- Mala Aravindan
- M. S. Thripunithura
- Thodupuzha Radhakrishnan as Sekharan, Ramachandran's cellmate and close friend
- Kozhikkode Sarada
- Joseph E.A
- Ceylon Manohar
- Punnapra Appachan
- Meena as Ammini Amma

== Soundtrack ==
The music was composed by A. T. Ummer, with lyrics were written by Bichu Thirumala.

No.	Song	Singers	Lyrics	Length (m:ss)
1	"Mani Muzhangi Kovil"	Vani Jairam	Bichu Thirumala	
2	"Maram Chaadi Nadannoru"	K. J. Yesudas	Bichu Thirumala	
3	"Somabimba Vadana"	S. Janaki	Bichu Thirumala	
