= Mangudi Minor =

- Title card
- Directed by: V. C. Guhanathan
- Screenplay by: V. C. Guhanathan
- Produced by: A. R. Kannappan Chettiar
- Starring: Vijayakumar; Rajinikanth; Sripriya
- Cinematography: A. Somasundaram
- Edited by: R. Bhaskaran; T. Thirunavukkarasu
- Music by: Chandrabose
- Production company: S. P. V. Films
- Release date: 19 May 1978
- Running time: 136 minutes
- Country: India
- Language: Tamil

Mangudi Minor is a 1978 Indian Tamil-language film written and directed by V. C. Guhanathan. The film stars Vijayakumar, Rajinikanth and Sripriya. It is a remake of the 1972 Hindi film Raampur Ka Lakshman. The film was released on 19 May 1978.

== Cast ==
- Vijayakumar as Lakshman (Mangudi Minor)
- Rajinikanth as Kumar
- Sripriya as Rekha
- M. N. Rajam as Lakshman's mother
- A. Sakunthala as Julie
- Ramadas as Kumar's uncle
- Isari Velan as Lakshman's friend
- Arunprakash as Prakash
- Ceylon Manohar as Prathap

== Production ==
A Tamil remake of the Hindi film Raampur Ka Lakshman was announced as being in development in March 1973 with S. P. Muthuraman attached as director, Rajan Enterprises producing and V. C. Guhanathan as screenwriter. The film was later titled Raman Thambi Lakshmanan and Vietnam Veedu Sundaram was attached to write the dialogues, but it did not materialise. When the project was revived by a different company with Guhanathan as director, he approached Rajinikanth to act in the film. Rajinikanth initially refused due to his busy schedule but later accepted and completed his work within nine days.

== Soundtrack ==
The music was composed by Chandrabose, and Vaali wrote the lyrics. The song "Neenga Nenachapadi" attained popularity.

Track listing
No.	Title	Singer(s)	Length
1.	"Neenga Nenachapadi"	T. M. Soundararajan	3:40
2.	"Kazhuvura Neeril"	Ceylon Manohar	3:40
3.	"Unnidam Solven"	T. M. Soundararajan, S. Janaki	4:18
4.	"Kannan Ange"	Vani Jairam	4:31
5.	"En Kayil Iruppathu"	P. Susheela	4:03
Total length:			20:12
