= Amma Manasu =

- Directed by: K. Viswanath
- Written by: D. V. Narasaraju
- Screenplay by: K. Viswanath
- Story by: K. Viswanath
- Produced by: G. V. S. Raju
- Starring: Chalam; Jayanthi; Kaikala Satyanarayana; Bharathi Vishnuvardhan; Shubha
- Cinematography: B. Ramachandraiah
- Edited by: Bandi Gopal Rao
- Music by: K. V. Mahadevan
- Production company: Vijayalakshmi Movies
- Release date: 16 November 1974
- Country: India
- Language: Telugu

Amma Manasu (transl. Mom's Heart) is a 1974 Indian Telugu-language drama film, written and directed by K. Viswanath, and produced by G. V. S. Raju. It stars and ensemble cast Chalam, Jayanthi, Kaikala Satyanarayana, Bharathi Vishnuvardhan, Shubha, Chalapathi Rao and Mallikarjuna Rao. The music is composed by K. V. Mahadevan with production design by V. Bhaskar Raju.

== Cast ==
- Chalam
- Jayanthi
- Kaikala Satyanarayana
- Bharathi Vishnuvardhan
- Shubha
- Chalapathi Rao
- Mallikarjuna Rao
- Veerabhadra Rao
- K. Vijaya
- Master Bablu

== Soundtrack ==
The soundtrack is composed by K. V. Mahadevan with lyrics penned by Devulapalli Krishna Sastry, C. Narayana Reddy, and Veturi Sundararama Murthy.
