= Aparaajitha =

- Directed by: J. Sasikumar
- Written by: J. Sasikumar
- Screenplay by: J. Sasikumar
- Produced by: R. S. Prabhu
- Starring: Prem Nazir; Sharada; Jayabharathi; Jayan
- Cinematography: Anandakkuttan
- Edited by: G. Venkittaraman
- Music by: A. T. Ummer
- Production company: Sree Rajesh Films
- Distributed by: Sree Rajesh Films
- Release date: 27 October 1977
- Country: India
- Language: Malayalam

Aparaajitha is a 1977 Indian Malayalam-language film, directed by J. Sasikumar and produced by R. S. Prabhu. The film stars Prem Nazir, Sharada, Jayabharathi and Jayan. The film has musical score by A. T. Ummer.

== Cast ==
- Prem Nazir
- Sharada
- Jayabharathi
- Jayan
- Sukumari
- Adoor Bhasi
- Thikkurissy Sukumaran Nair
- Sreelatha Namboothiri
- Lalithasree
- M. G. Soman
- Meena
- Pala Thankam
- Vanchiyoor Radha

== Soundtrack ==
The music was composed by A. T. Ummer and the lyrics were written by Sreekumaran Thampi.

No.	Song	Singers	Lyrics	Length (m:ss)
1	"Adharam Kondu Nee"	P. Jayachandran	Sreekumaran Thampi	
2	"Gaana Gandharvan"	P. Susheela	Sreekumaran Thampi	
3	"Njaanaarennariyumo"	K. J. Yesudas	Sreekumaran Thampi	
4	"Peruvazhiyambalam"	K. J. Yesudas	Sreekumaran Thampi	
5	"Sreeparvathy Saraswathy"	P. Susheela	Sreekumaran Thampi	
6	"Varnavum Neeye"	K. J. Yesudas, S. Janaki	Sreekumaran Thampi	
7	"Varnavum Neeye" (Sad)	K. J. Yesudas, S. Janaki	Sreekumaran Thampi	
