= Jayan quotes =

Satirical quotes

Jayan quotes (ജയൻ ചൊല്ലുകൾ) or Jayan dialogues (ജയൻ ഡയലോഗുകൾ) are satirical quotes of superhuman strength in Malayalam that are based on the late action star Jayan. Jayan worked in Malayalam cinema, a sector of the Indian movie industry based in Kerala. Jayan quotes began as an internet and SMS phenomenon amongst Malayalees around the world in the early 2000s following a resurgence of the actor's popularity in the late 1990s. These satirical quotes are similar to memes around Chuck Norris, Kyle Katarn, Rajnikanth, and Dharmendra. The quotes attained mainstream attention and have become part of popular culture in Kerala.

== Origin ==
=== Jayan's superhuman image ===
The idea behind the quotes began with Jayan's stunt performances in action thrillers of the late 1970s, for which the actor seldom relied on stunt doubles. The stunts, along with his machismo image, deep voice, and unique attire contributed to Jayan's superhero personna. After his death in a helicopter accident while performing a stunt, these gradually paved way to the actor transforming into a legend over time while the fascination towards his image and style remained dormant in later generations, eventually giving rise to his persona's depiction as a comic superhero and in the process, the Jayan quotes.

=== 1990s Mimics Movement ===
Jayan quotes is related to the popularity of mimicry, an artform of imitation, comedy skits and impersonation, which gained mainstream fame among Malayalee communities in the 1990s. Mimics sector was going through a period of stagnation with washed up ideas and worn out programs and at one point of time, was even facing a threat of dying out. It was during this crisis period that some groups decided to exploit Jayan's image and devised impersonations and skits based on Jayan persona which became instant hits giving rise to full scale commercialisation of the persona which was presented as a comic superhero who frequently delivered signature quotes demonstrating superhuman strength.

== Format ==
Jayan quotes follow a unique pattern in that these are dialogues which are almost always in first person (unlike other trending factoids and jokes which are in third person). These dialogues are depicted as being said by Jayan or the person in the Jayan persona (although the actor has never uttered a single such quote in his lifetime). All known Jayan quotes are originally in Malayalam language. Most of the quotes follow a general format; If there was "this", could've turned into "that" or If "this" was available, (I) could've done "that". For example, a popular Jayan quote is "If there was a football field with four wells, could've played a game of carrom". There are also quotes which do not follow this general rule such as another quote which says: "What? the money purse in my pocket was actually a cement bag?"

=== Voice and style ===
The voice style used to say Jayan quotes actually come from the style of dialogue delivery in Jayan films released after the actor's death in which the voice was dubbed by Alleppey Ashraf, a popular mimicry artist of the time. Although the tone does resemble Jayan's original sound, the voice imitated widely in mimics programs and grotesquely used style is that of Alleppey Ashraf. Actor Jayan is not known to have ever uttered a single Jayan quote during his life.

=== Popular quotes ===
English translations of some of the highly popular quotes are given below:

- Had I got a python, could have used it as a belt
- If a storm blew, could've enjoyed the breeze.
- If a volcano blew, could've enjoyed the warmth.
- If the sun could be reached, could've enjoyed a sun bath.
- If a knife was available, could've pricked the skin.
- If there was an elephant here, could've done some wrestling (same quote replacing elephant with "crocodile")

== See also ==
- Chuck Norris facts

== Bibliography ==
- Mathrubhumi Weekly, November 21, 2010
- Chithrabhumi, November 25, 2010
