= Midukkipponnamma =

- Directed by: A. B. Raj
- Written by: Sreemoolanagaram Vijayan
- Screenplay by: Sreemoolanagaram Vijayan
- Starring: Jayan; Jayabharathi; Paravoor Bharathan
- Cinematography: Masthan
- Edited by: K. Sankunni
- Music by: M. K. Arjunan
- Production company: Roshni Movies
- Distributed by: Roshni Movies
- Release date: 8 December 1978
- Country: India
- Language: Malayalam

Midukkipponnamma is a 1978 Indian Malayalam film, directed by A. B. Raj. The film stars Jayan, Jayabharathi and Paravoor Bharathan in the lead roles. The film has musical score by M. K. Arjunan.

== Cast ==
- Jayan
- Jayabharathi
- Paravoor Bharathan
