= Hemantharaathri =

- Directed by: P.Balthasar
- Written by: Sherrif; Ramachandhran
- Produced by: P. Balthasar
- Starring: Jayan; Jayabharathi; Vincent; Adoor Bhasi
- Music by: A. T. Ummer; Lyrics: Bichu Thirumala
- Production company: Murali Movies
- Distributed by: Murali Movies
- Release date: 15 January 1978
- Country: India
- Language: Malayalam
- Budget: Big budget hit
- Box office: It Was The most Senseus Movies of All time

Hemantharaathri is a 1978 Indian Malayalam film, directed by P.Balthasar and Produced by P. Balthasar.The film stars Jayan, Jayabharathi, Vincent and Adoor Bhasi in the lead roles. The film has musical score by A. T. Ummer.

== Cast ==
- Jayan as Vinodh
- Kamal Hassan as Dr. Ravi
- Jayabharathi as Radha/Usha
- Vincent as Ramesh
- Adoor Bhasi as Shankaran Pilla, Radha's father
- Bahadoor as Appu
- Prema as Kunjamma
- Unnimary as Jaanu

== Soundtrack ==
The music was composed by A. T. Ummer and the lyrics were written by Bichu Thirumala.

| No. | Song | Singers | Lyrics | Length (m:ss) |
|---|---|---|---|---|
| 1 | "Ithile Oru Puzha" | K. J. Yesudas | Bichu Thirumala | |
| 2 | "Madanonmaada Raathri" | S. Janaki | Bichu Thirumala | |
| 3 | "Pattaanikkunnirangi" | K. J. Yesudas, P. Susheela, Chorus | Bichu Thirumala | |
| 4 | "Rajathakamalangal" | S. Janaki, P. Susheela | Bichu Thirumala | |
| 5 | "Vai Raja Vai" (Bhaagyamulla Pambaram) | K. J. Yesudas, Ambili | Bichu Thirumala | |
