= Ente Sathrukkal =

- Directed by: S. Babu
- Starring: Jayan
- Music by: M. K. Arjunan
- Production company: Amardeep Films
- Distributed by: Amardeep Films
- Release date: 21 May 1982
- Country: India
- Language: Malayalam

Ente Sathrukkal is a 1982 Indian Malayalam film, directed by S. Babu. The film stars Jayan in the lead role. The film has musical score by M. K. Arjunan.

== Cast ==
- Jayan

== Soundtrack ==
The music was composed by M. K. Arjunan and the lyrics were written by Poovachal Khader.

No.	Song	Singers	Lyrics	Length (m:ss)
1	"Anuraagam Oru Daham"	K. J. Yesudas	Poovachal Khader	
2	"Baale Edi Baale"	K. J. Yesudas, Ambili	Poovachal Khader	
3	"Neelakkaadil Peelikkaadil"	K. J. Yesudas, Ambili, Chorus	Poovachal Khader	
4	"Paavaka Jwaalakal Uyarunnu"	K. J. Yesudas	Poovachal Khader	
