= Naayattu =

1980 Indian Malayalam-language action film by Sreekumaran Thampi

- Directed by: Sreekumaran Thampi
- Written by: Sreekumaran Thampi
- Starring: Jayan; Prem Nazir; Sukumari; Zarina Wahab; Adoor Bhasi
- Cinematography: C. Ramachandra Menon
- Edited by: K. Narayanan
- Music by: Shyam
- Production company: Hemnag Productions
- Distributed by: Hemnag Productions
- Release date: 27 November 1980
- Country: India
- Language: Malayalam

Naayattu (transl. Hunting) is a 1980 Indian Malayalam-language action film written and directed by Sreekumaran Thampi and produced by Hemnag Productions. It is a remake of the 1973 Hindi film Zanjeer. The film stars Jayan in the lead role with Prem Nazir, Sukumari and Adoor Bhasi in supporting roles. The music was composed by Shyam, while cinematography was handled by C. Ramachandra Menon. The film revolves around a tough and honest police officer who clashes with a crime boss who, unbeknownst to him, happens to be his parents' murderer.

This was Jayan's 100th film. This film was a major commercial success and was one of the highest-grossing films of 1980. The film completed a 50-day run. This is the only film in which Prem Nazir played a supporting role at his superstardom under Jayan in the lead. In other films Prem Nazir and Jayan are co-actors.

== Cast ==
- Jayan as Kerala Police Sub Inspector Vijayan
- Prem Nazir as Rowdy Abdulla
- Sukumari
- Adoor Bhasi as Joseph
- Meena as Janaki
- Zarina Wahab
- Jayamalini
- KPAC Sunny
- N. Govindankutty
- Lalu Alex as Peter
- K. P. A. C. Azeez
- Poojappura Ravi
- T.R Radhakrishnan
- Philomina
- Lissi
- Sumagali
- Pushpa
- Vallathol Unnikrishnan as Prabhakaran

== Soundtrack ==
The music was composed by Shyam and the lyrics were written by Sreekumaran Thampi.

No.	Song	Singers	Lyrics	Length (m:ss)
1	"Enne Njan Marannu"	S. Janaki, Jolly Abraham	Sreekumaran Thampi	
2	"Kaalame Kaalame Kanakathil"	K. J. Yesudas	Sreekumaran Thampi	
3	"Kannilkkannil Nokkiyirikkam"	P. Jayachandran, Vani Jairam	Sreekumaran Thampi	
4	"Parimalakulir"	K. J. Yesudas	Sreekumaran Thampi	

== Box office ==
The film was commercial success.
