= Shubha (actress) =

Indian actress

- Born: Vijayawada, NTR district, Andhra Pradesh, India
- Years active: 1967–2003
- Parent(s): Vedantam Raghavayya; Suryaprabha
- Relatives: Pushpavalli (aunt); Rekha (cousin)

Shubha is an Indian actress who acted prominently in Malayalam films. She was a lead actress during the late 1970s and early 1980s. She also acted in Telugu, Kannada, Tamil, and Hindi films. She was the second lead in the cult Kannada classic Naagarahaavu (1972). For this, she received Karnataka State Film Award for Best Supporting Actress for the year 1972–73.

== Personal life ==
She was born to Telugu film actor and director Vedantam Raghavayya and Suryaprabha, who was also an actress, in Krishna District, Andhra Pradesh, India. She has five sisters and a brother. Her aunt Pushpavalli (Hindi actor Rekha's mother) was also a Telugu actress and was married to Gemini Ganeshan. That makes Shubha a cousin of Hindi film actress Rekha.

== Filmography ==
=== Malayalam ===
- Varavaay (2000)
- Avalude Janmam (1994)
- Sarovaram (1993) as Balamani
- Amina Tailors (1991) as Pathumma
- Avalkkoru Janmam Koodi (1990)) as Maheswariyamma
- Samarppanam (1987)
- Kaathirippinte Thudakkam (1987)
- Mangalya Charthu (1987) as Vasanthy
- Adukkan Entheluppam (1986) as Susimol
- Niramulla Ravukal (1986) as Radha's mother
- Ahalya (1986)
- Kaiyum Thlayum Purathidaruthe (1985) ... Leela
- Idanilangal (1985) as Madhavi
- Adhyayam Onnu Muthal (1985) as Soudamini
- Vilichu Vilikettu (1985)
- Gaayathridevi Ente Amma (1985)
- Snehicha Kuttathinu (1985) as Saraswathi
- Eeran Sandhya (1985) as Sumathi
- Vellarikka Pattanam (1985)
- Thirakkil Alppa Samayam (1984)
- Aagraham (1984)
- Panchavadi Palam (1984) as Poothana
- Aalkkoottathil Thaniye (1984) as Vishalam
- NH 47 (1984) as Ramani
- Manithali (1984) as Mariyamma
- Thacholi Thankappan (1984) as Sujatha
- Manasse Ninakku Mangalam (1984) as Meenakshi
- Parannu Parannu Parannu (1984) as Beauty Parlour Owner
- Swapnalokam (1983)
- Rugma (1983) as Gracy
- Maniyara (1983) as Ramla
- Thavalam (1983) as Thankamma
- Enne Njan Thedunnu (1983) as Malu
- Lekhayude Maranam Oru Flashback (1983) as Vishalakshi
- Nathi Muthal Nathi Vare (1983) as Jayasree
- Paalam (1983)
- Oru Madapravinte Katha (1983)
- Arabikkadal (1983)
- Vaarikuzhi (1982)
- Mylanchi (1982) as Suhara
- Keni (1982) as Rajani
- Kilukilukkam (1982)
- Chiriyo Chiri (1982) as Suhara
- Ee Nadu (1982) as Sreedevi
- Ithiri Neram Othiri Karyam (1982) as Annamma
- Niram Marunna Nimishangal (1982)
- Vazhikal Yaathrakkar (1981)
- Chaata (1981) as Damayanthi
- Vaadaka Veettile Athidhi (1981)
- Sanchari (1981) as Shubha
- Theekkali (1981)
- Sphodanam (1981) as Gouri
- Thaaraavu (1981) as Neeli
- Swarangal Swapnagal (1981) as Usha
- Dhruvasangamam (1981) as Rajalakshmi
- Manassinte Theerthayathra (1981) as Arundhati
- Vayal (1981) as Karthu
- Meen (1980) as Sara
- Kochu Kochu Thettukal (1980) as Jayasree
- Air Hostess (1980) as Sandhya
- Shishirathil Oru Vasantham (1980)
- Aniyaatha Valakal (1980) as Mini
- Idi Muzhakkam (1980) as Chirutha
- Karnan
- Youvanam Daaham (1980)
- Agni Vyooham (1979)
- Ward No.7 (1979)
- Vijayanum Veeranum (1979) as Malini
- Kazhukan (1979) as Malathi
- Rakthamillatha Manushyan (1979) as Sumathi
- Enikku Njaan Swantham (1979) as Meenu
- Pambaram (1979) as Shanthi
- Ezhunirangal (1979) as Bindu
- Adipapam (1979)
- Pancharathnam (1979)
- Aayiram Vasanthangal (1979)
- Iniyethra Sandhyakal (1979)
- Bandhanam (1978) as Sarojini
- Adimakkachavadam (1978) as Ponnamma
- Aanayum Ambariyum (1978)
- Aasramam (1978)
- Tiger Salim (1978)
- Karnaparvam (1978)
- Aarum Anyaralla (1978) as Dancer Girigiribhai
- Nakshathrangale Kaaval (1978)
- Balapareekshanam (1978) as Raji
- Pattalam Janaki (1977)
- Udyaanalakshmi (1976)
- Swami Ayyappan (1975)
- Devi Kanyakumari (1974)
- Gayathri (1973)
- Ollathu Mathi (1967)

=== Telugu ===
- Guduputaani (1972)
- Palletoori Bava (1973) as Rangamma
- Mangalya Bhagyam (1974) as Mallika
- Amma Manasu (1974)
- O Seeta Katha (1974)
- Jeevana Jyoti (1975)
- Jyothi (1976)
- Tharam Marindi (1977)
- Kalanthakulu (1978)
- Choopulu Kalasina Subhavela (1978)
- Mana Voori Pandavulu (1978)
- Karthika Deepam (1979)
- Thathayya Premaleelalu (1980)
- Jagannatha Rathachakralu (1982) as Seetha
- Kalavari Samsaram (1982) as Sarala
- Illalu Priyuralu (1984)
- Rustum (1984) as Gowri
- Vijetha (1985)
- Khooni (1985) as Janardhan's wife
- Surya Chandra (1985)
- Donga (1985)
- Maharaju (1985)
- Garjana (1985) as Manorama Devi
- Apoorva Sahodarulu (1986)
- Shravana Meghalu (1986)
- Magadheerudu (1986)
- Sirivennela (1986)
- Lawyer Bharathi Devi (1987)
- Ummadi Mogudu (1987)
- Yuddha Bhoomi (1988)
- Chinni Krishnudu (1988)
- Janaki Ramudu (1988)
- Donga Kollu (1988) as Tulasamma
- Ontari Poratam (1989)
- Mahajananiki Maradalu Pilla (1990)
- April 1st Vidudhala (1991) as Krupa Mani
- Madhura Nagarilo (1991)
- Prema Drohi (1992)
- Antham (1992)
- Gharana Mogudu (1992) as Raju's mother
- Mechanic Alludu (1993) as Parvathy
- Allari Priyudu (1993)
- Sarigamalu (1994)
- Chilakapachcha Kaapuram (1995)
- Raja Simham (1995)
- Alibaba Adbhuta Deepam (1995) as Alibaba and Chinababu's mother
- Hitler (1997)
- Jai Bajarangabhali (1997)
- Annamayya (1997)
- Mama Bagunnava (1997)
- Kabir Das (2003)

=== Kannada ===
- Mahabharatha (1997)
- Kalyana Rekhe (1993)
- Chikkejamanru (1992)
- Bangaradantha Maga (1991)
- Rowdy & MLA (1991)
- Rudra Tandava (1990)
- Raja Kempu Roja (1990)
- Mruthyunjaya (1990)
- Ajay Vijay (1990)
- Mangalya (1990)
- Gajapathi Garvabhanga (1989)
- Nanjundi Kalyana (1989)
- Ravana Rajya (1987)
- Onde Goodina Hakkigalu (1987) as Kaveri
- Jeevana Jyothi (1987)
- Manamecchida Hudugi (1986)
- Madhvacharya (1986)
- Anand (1986)
- Paduvaaralli Pandavaru (1978)
- Galate Samsara (1977)
- Maagiya Kanasu (1977)
- Mugdha Manava (1977)
- Naa Ninna Mareyalare (1976)
- Makkala Bhagya (1976)
- Phalitamsha (1976)
- Bhagya Jyothi (1975)
- Naagarahaavu (1972)

=== Tamil ===
- Pattikada Pattanama (1972) - debut in Tamil as Rakkamma
- Baghdad Perazhagi (1973) as Princess Zeenat
- Sollathaan Ninaikkiren (1973) as Manjula
- Ponvandu (1973) as Rukmani
- Vijaya (1973) as Lily
- Maanikka Thottil (1974) as Lakshmi
- Raja Nagam (1974) as Margaret
- Anbai Thedi (1974) as Radha
- Ezhaikkum Kaalam Varum (1975) as Thangam
- Unga Veettu Kalyanam (1975) as Lalitha
- Manidhanum Dheivamagalam (1975) as Kalyani
- Enakkoru Magan Pirappan (1975) as Lakshmi
- Navarathinam (1977) as Muthamma
- Gaslight Mangamma (1977) as Radha
- Thanga Rangan (1978)
- Kaali (1980) as Chandra
- Chinna Poove Mella Pesu (1987)
- Poovizhi Raja (1988)
- Pattikaattu Thambi (1988) as Parvathi
