= Raathrikal Ninakku Vendi =

- Directed by: Rochy Alex
- Written by: Augustine Prakash; S. L. Puram Eeswaran (dialogues)
- Screenplay by: S. L. Puram Eeswaran
- Starring: Jayan; Krishnachandran; Prameela; Baby Sumathi
- Cinematography: K. K. Menon
- Edited by: K. Sankunni
- Music by: A. T. Ummer
- Production company: Santhosh Films
- Distributed by: Santhosh Films
- Release date: 19 January 1979
- Country: India
- Language: Malayalam

Raathrikal Ninakku Vendi is a 1979 Indian Malayalam film, directed by Rochy Alex. The film stars Jayan, Krishnachandran, Prameela and Baby Sumathi in the lead roles. The film has musical score by A. T. Ummer.

== Cast ==
- Jayan
- Krishnachandran
- Prameela
- Baby Sumathi
- Sukumari
- Jagathy Sreekumar
- Manavalan Joseph
- Prathapachandran
- Mallika Sukumaran

== Soundtrack ==
The music was composed by A. T. Ummer and the lyrics were written by Mankombu Gopalakrishnan.

| No. | Song | Singers | Lyrics | Length (m:ss) |
|---|---|---|---|---|
| 1 | "Aavani Naalile" | P. Jayachandran, S.P. Sailaja | Mankombu Gopalakrishnan | |
| 2 | "Kamaladalangal" | S. Janaki | Mankombu Gopalakrishnan | |
| 3 | "Raathrikal Ninakkuvendi" | K. J. Yesudas, B. Vasantha | Mankombu Gopalakrishnan | |
| 4 | "Sree Raajaraajeshwari" | Vani Jairam | Mankombu Gopalakrishnan | |
