= Aadipaapam =

1979 film

- Directed by: K. P. Kumaran
- Written by: K. P. Kumaran
- Screenplay by: K. P. Kumaran
- Produced by: P. G. Gopalakrishnan
- Starring: Shubha; Sukumaran
- Cinematography: Hemachandran
- Edited by: G. Venkittaraman
- Music by: Shyam
- Production company: Kamini International
- Distributed by: Kamini International
- Release date: 26 October 1979
- Country: India
- Language: Malayalam

Aadipaapam is a 1979 Indian Malayalam film, directed by K. P. Kumaran and produced by P. G. Gopalakrishnan. The film stars Shubha and Sukumaran in the lead roles. The film has musical score by Shyam.

== Cast ==
- Shubha
- Sukumaran

== Soundtrack ==
The music was composed by Shyam and the lyrics were written by Poovachal Khader.

No.	Song	Singers	Lyrics	Length (m:ss)
1	"Aadipapam Paarilinnum"	S. Janaki	Poovachal Khader	
2	"Annushassukal"	Chorus, Jolly Abraham	Poovachal Khader	
