= Poovachal Khader =

Indian lyricist (1948–2021)

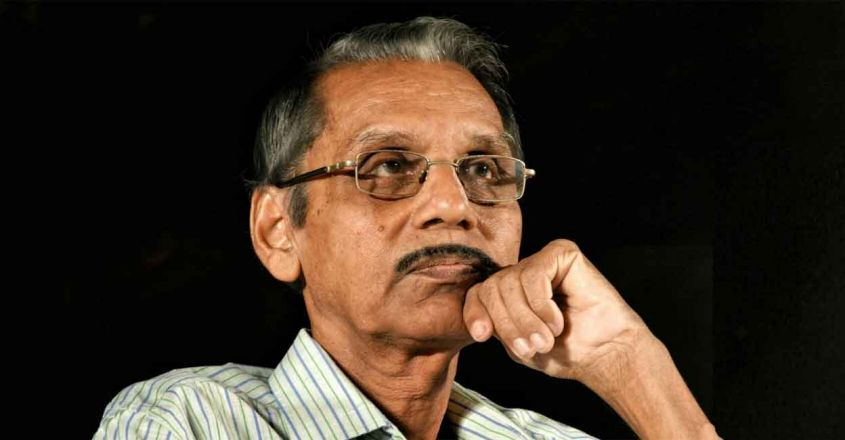
- Poet, lyricist
- Born: 25 December 1948; Thiruvananthapuram, Kerala, India
- Died: 22 June 2021 (aged 72); Thiruvananthapuram, Kerala, India
- Education: B.Tech.

Poovachal Khader (25 December 1948 – 22 June 2021) was a Malayalam lyricist from Kerala who worked mainly in Malayalam film industry. His first movie as a lyricist was Kaattuvithachavan (1973) but his first released movie was Chuzhi (1973). His last movie was Mothathi Kozhappa (2023).

== Biography ==
Khader was born on Christmas day in 1948, in a village named Poovachal in the present-day Thiruvananthapuram district. His original name was Muhammed Abdul Khader. His parents were Aboobacker Pillai and Rabiyathul Adabiya Beevi. Chuzhi, released in 1973 under the musical direction of M. S. Baburaj, was the first movie released after Poovachal Khader entered the industry as a lyricist and was proud of having written lyrics for more than 900 songs in the Malayalam film industry. He, along with Bichu Thirumala, dominated the Malayalam film industry for more than a decade. Peter Reuben, A. T. Ummer, Shyam, K. V. Mahadevan, G. Devarajan, K. Raghavan, M. K. Arjunan, Raveendran, Johnson, MG Radhakrishnan, Gangai Amaran, Raghu Kumar, Jerry Amaldev, Ilayaraja and Shankar–Ganesh have set tunes to his lyrics whereby his works have been musically voiced by vocal maestros like K. J. Yesudas, P. Jayachandran, Vani Jairam, S. Janaki, K. S. Chithra, P. Susheela, P. Madhuri, Unni Menon and Lathika. In 2006, Khader received the Kerala Sangeetha Nataka Akademi Award.

Khader died from a heart attack on 22 June 2021, at the age of 72. He also had tested positive for COVID-19 and was undergoing treatment for it at the time of death. He also suffered from numerous comorbidities. He was buried with full state honours at the Juma Masjid in his birthplace. He is survived by his wife and two daughters.

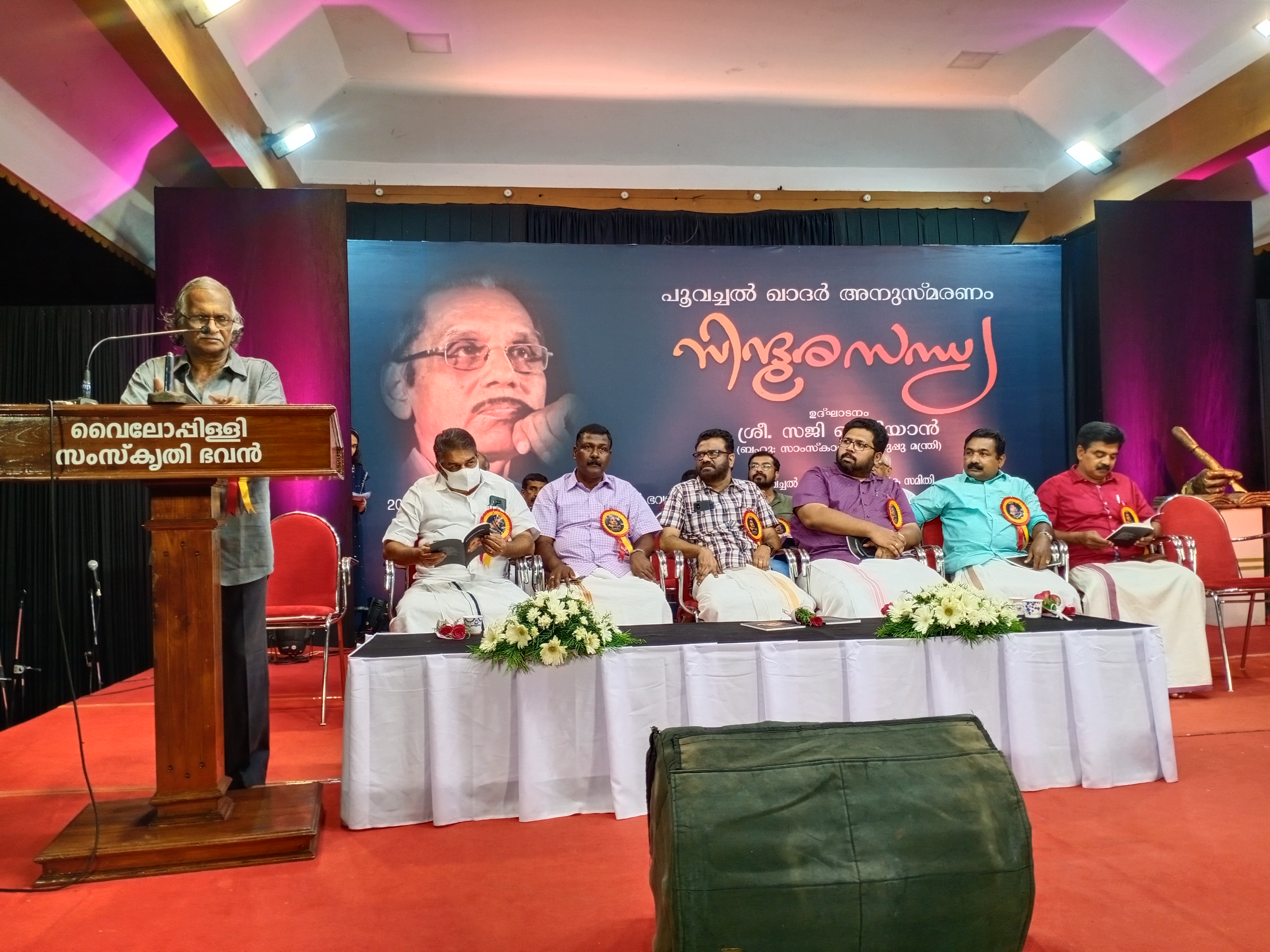
Poovachal Khader Memorial Meeting 2022

== Complete Discography ==
Year	Movie	Musician
1973	Kattuvithachavan	Peter Rueben
1973	Chuzhi	M. S. Baburaj
1973	Kavitha	K Raghavan
1975	Criminals (Kayangal)	M. S. Baburaj
1975	Utsavam	A. T. Ummer
1977	Sooryakanthi	Jaya Vijaya
1978	Iniyaval Urangatte	MK Arjunan
1978	Kadalkkaakkakal	A. T. Ummer
1979	Aadipaapam	Shyam
1979	Choola	Raveendran
1979	Iniyaathra	Shyam
1979	Kaayalum Kayarum	KV Mahadevan
1979	Lillyppookkal	Kottayam Joy
1979	Maanavadharmam	G Devarajan
1979	Ottapettavar	Shyam
1979	Pathinaalam Raavu	K Raghavan
1979	Thakara	MG Radhakrishnan
1979	Thuramukham	MK Arjunan
1980	Aarohanam	Shyam
1980	Chaamaram	MG Radhakrishnan, Raveendran
1980	Lorry	M. S. Viswanathan
1980	Malankaattu	K Raghavan
1980	Oru Varsham Oru Maasam	Raveendran
1980	Prakadanam	G Devarajan
1980	Sishirathil Oru Vasantham	Shyam
1981	Agniyudham	A. T. Ummer
1981	Attimari	KJ Joy
1981	Greeshmajwaala	A. T. Ummer
1981	Ithaa Oru Dhikkaari	A. T. Ummer
1981	Kalopaasana	K Raghavan
1981	Karimpoocha	KJ Joy
1981	Maniyan Pilla Adhava Maniyan Pilla	G Devarajan
1981	Oothikkaachiya Ponnu	MK Arjunan
1981	Pinneyum Pookkunna Kaadu	Shyam
1981	Poochasanyaasi	KJ Yesudas
1981	Swapnaraagam	Raveendran
1981	Thira	K Raghavan
1981	Urukku Mushtikal	Shyam
1981	Veliyettam	MK Arjunan
1981	Veshangal	Shyam
1981	Visham	Raghu Kumar
1982	Aa Raathri	Ilayaraja
1982	Aarambham	Shankar–Ganesh, AT Ummer, Shyam, KJ Joy
1982	Aattakkalam	Shyam
1982	Anuraagakkodathi	A. T. Ummer
1982	Beedikkunjamma	A. T. Ummer
1982	Chilanthivala	Guna Singh
1982	Deepa	Raghu Kumar
1982	Ente Sathrukkal (Porattam)	M. K. Arjunan
1982	Enthino Pookkunna Pookkal	Shyam
1982	Football	Johnson
1982	Ivan Oru Simham	AT Ummer
1982	Jambulingam	M. K. Arjunan
1982	Kaaliyamarddanam	KJ Joy
1982	Kaliman Prathimakal	M. K. Arjunan
1982	Kallimullu	Mohammed Subair
1982	Kanmanikkorumma (Ushnabhoomi)	Shyam
1982	Kayam	M. K. Arjunan
1982	Maruppacha	AT Ummer
1982	Mazhu	Shyam
1982	Naagamadathu Thampuraatti	M. K. Arjunan
1982	Naalathe Sandhya (Malayorangalil Chuvappu)	M. K. Arjunan
1982	Novemberinte Nashtam	MG Radhakrishnan, KC Varghese
1982	Paalangal	Johnson
1982	Pooviriyum Pulari	Jerry Amaldev
1982	Postmortem	KJ Joy
1982	Premaabhishekam	Gangai Amaran
1982	Raagadeepam	Ilayaraja
1982	Saravarsham	Shyam
1982	Sree Ayyappanum Vaavarum	AT Ummer
1982	Thadaakam	AT Ummer
1982	Theeraatha Bandhangal	K Raghavan
1982	Thuranna Jail	Johnson
1982	Vidhichathum Kothichathum (Kasthoori)	Raveendran
1983	Aashrayam	MB Sreenivasan
1983	Aattakkalaasham	Raveendran
1983	Arabikkadal	M. K. Arjunan
1983	Asthi	G Devarajan
1983	Asthram	Shyam
1983	Belt Mathai	Raveendran
1983	Deepaaradhana	AT Ummer
1983	Ee Yugam	AT Ummer
1983	Eettappuli	G Devarajan
1983	Ente Kadha	AT Ummer
1983	Gurudakshina	KJ Joy
1983	Hello Madras Girl	Gangai Amaran
1983	Himavaahini	G Devarajan
1983	Justice Raja	Gangai Amaran
1983	Kaathirunna Divasam	PS Divakar
1983	Kaikeyi	MS Viswanathan
1983	Kodunkaattu	KJ Joy
1983	Mazhakkaalamegham	Rangan
1983	Mazhanilaavu	Raveendran
1983	Mortuary	KJ Joy
1983	Onnu Chirikkoo	Johnson
1983	Oru Mukham Pala Mukham	AT Ummer
1983	Paalam	AT Ummer
1983	Passport	KJ Joy
1983	Ponthooval	Raghu Kumar
1983	Prathijnja	Ben Surendran
1983	Rathilayam	AT Ummer, MG Radhakrishnan
1983	Samrambham	KJ Joy
1983	Snehabandham	Gangai Amaran
1983	Thaavalam	Johnson
1983	Yudham	Shankar–Ganesh
1984	Aagraham	AT Ummer
1984	Alakadalinnakkare	Gangai Amaran
1984	Amme Naaraayana	AT Ummer
1984	Anthichuvappu	AT Ummer
1984	Ariyaatha Veedhikal	MS Viswanathan
1984	Attahaasam (Tharunyam)	MG Radhakrishnan
1984	Bullet	Guna Singh
1984	Chakkarayumma	Shyam
1984	Chandragirikkotta	Sathyam
1984	Ente Upaasana	Johnson
1984	Idavelaykku Shesham	Raveendran
1984	Inakkili	Shyam
1984	Ivide Ingane	Shyam
1984	Ivide Thudangunnu	Johnson
1984	Jeevitham	Gangai Amaran
1984	Kadamattathachan	AT Ummer
1984	Karimbu	Shyam
1984	Kodathi	Shyam
1984	Kooduthedunna Parava	AT Ummer
1984	Krishna Guruvaayoorappa	V Dakshinamoorthy
1984	Kurishuyudham	KJ Joy
1984	Makale Maappu Tharoo	MK Arjunan
1984	Manassariyaathe	Raghu Kumar
1984	Manasse Ninakku Mangalam	Raveendran
1984	Minimol Vathikkaanil	MS Viswanathan
1984	Mynaakam	Raveendran
1984	NH 47	Shyam
1984	Niraparaadhi	Shankar–Ganesh
1984	Oru Thettinte Kadha	AT Ummer
1984	Paavam Krooran	AT Ummer
1984	Piriyilla Naam	KV Mahadevan
1984	Sandarbham	Johnson
1984	Swanthamevide Bandhamevide	Johnson
1984	Theere Pratheekshikkathe	AT Ummer
1984	Thirakal	Shankar–Ganesh
1984	Umaanilayam	Shyam
1985	Aa Neram Alpa Dooram	Johnson
1985	Akkacheede Kunjuvava	Johnson
1985	Ambada Njaane	MK Arjunan
1985	Aram+Aram=Kinnaram	Raghu Kumar
1985	Archana Aaradhana	Shyam
1985	Chillukottaram	AT Ummer
1985	Choodaatha Pookkal	KJ Joy
1985	Chorakku Chora	Guna Singh
1985	Ee Shabdam Innathe Shabdam	Shyam
1985	Ee Thalamura Ingana	G Devarajan
1985	Ee Thanalil Ithiri Neram	Shyam
1985	Ente Ponnumol	Shankar–Ganesh
1985	Ezhumuthal Onpathuvare	KJ Joy
1985	Iniyum Kadha Thudarum	Shyam
1985	Jeevante Jeevan	Shyam
1985	Kaattuthee	G Devarajan
1985	Kadha Ithuvare	Johnson
1985	Kanakachilanka Kilungikilungi	KJ Yesudas
1985	Maanyamahaajanangale	Shyam
1985	Madhuvidhu Theerum Munpe	KJ Joy
1985	Makan Ente Makan	Johnson
1985	Mounanombaram	Johnson
1985	Muhoortham 11:30	Shyam
1985	Nirakoottu	Shyam
1985	Njaan Piranna Naattil	AT Ummer
1985	Nullinovikkaathe	Rajamani
1985	Onathumbikkoroonjal	AT Ummer
1985	Onningu Vannenkil	Shyam
1985	Orikkal Oridathu	Raveendran
1985	Ormikkaan Omanikkaan	Raveendran
1985	Oru Kudakkeezhil	Johnson
1985	Parannuyaraan	Jerry Amaldev
1985	Prathikaarajwaala	Ilayaraja
1985	Priye Priyadarshini	KV Mahadevan
1985	Puzhayozhukum Vazhi	Raveendran
1985	Randum Randum Anchu	Shankar–Ganesh
1985	Shaantham Bheekaram	Shyam
1985	Shathru	AT Ummer
1985	Soundaryappinakkam	Rajasenan
1985	Telephonil Thodaruthu	Raveendran
1985	Thammil Thammil	Raveendran
1985	Ushasse Unaroo	Kannur Rajan
1985	Uyarthezhunelpu	AT Ummer
1985	Vannu Kandu Keezhadakki	Shyam
1985	Vasanthasena	Shyam
1986	Aalorungi Arangorungi	Jerry Amaldev
1986	Aarundivide Chodikkaan	AT Ummer
1986	Ariyaatha Bandham	MS Viswanathan
1986	Atham Chithira Chothi	Shyam
1986	Aval Kaathirunnu Avanum	Shyam
1986	Bhagavaan	MS Viswanathan
1986	Chila Nimishangalil	Rajasenan
1986	Ente Shabdam	AT Ummer
1986	Ice Cream	Johnson
1986	Karinaagam	AT Ummer
1986	Kshamichu Ennoru Vaakku	Shyam
1986	Love Birds (Oru Vettayude Kadha)	G Devarajan
1986	Moonnu maasangalku Munpu	Shyam
1986	Onnu Randu Moonnu	Rajasenan
1986	Padayani	AT Ummer
1986	Pournami Raathriyil	Raveendran
1986	Priyamvadakkoru Pranayageetham	MS Viswanathan
1986	Railway Cross	AT Ummer
1986	Shyaama	Raghu Kumar
1986	Somayaagam	Shyam
1986	Thaalavattam	Raghu Kumar, Rajamani
1987	Aadyaraathrikkumumbu (Irupatham Noottandu)	G Devarajan
1987	Aankiliyude Thaarattu	Shyam
1987	Athinumappuram	Johnson
1987	Avalude Kadha	AT Ummer
1987	Cheppu	Raghu Kumar
1987	Dheeran	AT Ummer
1987	Four Plus Four	Guna Singh
1987	Ithente Neethi	Johnson
1987	Ivare Sookshikkuka	Guna Singh
1987	Jaithrayaathra	Shyam
1987	Jungle Boy	SP Venkitesh
1987	Kaalaraathri	AT Ummer
1987	Kalathinte Shabdam	SP Venkitesh
1987	Kurukkan Raajaavaayi	AT Ummer
1987	Mangalyachaarthu (Thennale Ninneyum Thedi)	KV Mahadevan
1987	Nee Allengil Njan	AT Ummer
1987	Oru Sindoorapottinte Ormakku	Shyam
1987	Samarppanam	Vijay Anand
1987	Swaralayam	KV Mahadevan
1987	Veendum Lisa	Raghu Kumar
1987	Verukal Thedi	Sathyam
1988	Abkaari	Shyam
1988	Agnichirakulla Thumpi	Shyam
1988	Bheekaran	G Devarajan
1988	Chaaravalayam	SP Venkitesh
1988	Inquilabinte Puthri	AT Ummer
1988	Ithaa Oru Penkutti	AT Ummer
1988	Janmaantharam	SP Venkitesh
1988	Karate Girls	Shankar–Ganesh
1988	Maanasaputhri	Guna Singh
1988	Mrigashaalayil	Rajan Nagendra
1988	Mrithyunjayam	Ouseppachan
1988	Onninu Purake Mattonnu	Kannur Rajan
1988	Oru Swapnam Pole	Raveendran
1988	Prathikaaram	Chakravarthy
1988	Production No 1	Rajamani
1988	Rahasyam Paramarahasyam	SP Venkitesh
1988	Samhaaram	Chakravarthy
1988	Vida Parayaan Maathram	MK Arjunan
1989	Ancharakkulla Vandi	Navas
1989	Aval Oru Sindhu	Rajamani
1989	Chakkikkotha Chankaran	Shankar–Ganesh
1989	Dasaratham	Johnson
1989	Jeevitham Oru Raagam	Rajamani
1989	Kalpana House	Anu Malik
1989	Lal Americayil	Johnson
1989	Lillyppookkal Chuvannappol	Cochin Alex
1989	Mizhiyorangalil	Gangai Amaran
1989	Monchulla raavu (Samhara Thaandavam)	AT Ummer
1989	My Dear Rosy	Rajamani
1989	New Year	Shyam
1989	Praayapoorthiyaayavarku Maathram	AT Ummer
1989	Prabhaatham Chuvanna Theruvil	AT Ummer
1989	Puthiya Karukkal	SP Venkitesh
1989	Rathi	Navas
1989	Suprabhaatham	AT Ummer
1989	Varnatheru (Radham)	Johnson
1990	101 Raavukal	Jerry Amaldev
1990	Aadithaalam	AT Ummer
1990	Aalasyam	AT Ummer
1990	Avalkkoru janmam koodi	AT Ummer
1990	Avasaanathe Raathri	Rathnasoori
1990	Beauty Palace	MK Arjunan
1990	Chuvanna Kannukal	Jerry Amaldev
1990	Chuvappunaada	SP Venkitesh
1990	Eenam Thettaatha Kaattaaru (Kaattile Pennu)	Navas
1990	Enquiry	Rajamani
1990	Guest House	AT Ummer
1990	Iyer The Great	MS Viswanathan
1990	Judgement	SP Venkitesh
1990	Kadannalkkoodu	Kannur Rajan
1990	Mindaapoochakku Kalyanam (Ellaam Angayude Ishtam)	Raveendran
1990	Mouna Daham	SP Venkitesh
1990	Niyamam Enthucheyyum	Johnson
1990	Paadatha Veenayum Paadum	Raveendran
1990	Raagaveena	Kannur Rajan
1990	Raajavaazhcha	Johnson
1990	Shesham Screenil	Jeevan Prakash
1990	Sthreekku Vendi Sthree	MS Viswanathan
1990	Sunday 7 PM	Johnson
1990	Veena Meettiya Vilangukal	Shyam
1990	Wait a minute	Krishnathej
1991	Inapraavukal	Ram Lakshman
1991	Kaadambari	Manoharan
1991	Kadhaanaayika	SP Venkitesh
1991	Miss Stella	Raveendran
1991	Mookkilla Raajyathu	Ouseppachan
1991	Naagam	Raghu Kumar, SP Venkitesh
1991	Nagarathil Kallanmar	Manoharan
1991	Orutharam Randutharam Moonnutharam	SP Venkitesh
1991	Poonthenaruvi Chuvannu	Guna Singh
1991	Premolhsavam	Raveendran
1991	Teenage Love	Vasudevan
1991	Vashyam	AT Ummer
1991	Veendum Oru Aadyaraathri	Navas
1992	Annu Good Friday	Sivan
1992	Annu Muthal Innu Vare	Ravi Yogendran
1992	Ente Tuition Teacher	Raveendran
1992	Maanthrikacheppu	Johnson
1992	Mayangunna Manassukal	Krishnathej
1992	Omanikkaanoru Shishiram	TK Moorthi
1992	Pramaanikal	AT Ummer
1992	Rishi	SP Venkitesh
1992	Start Immediately	Krishnathej
1993	Neelachithrangalkethire (Thiraseelakku Pinnil)	MG Radhakrishnan
1994	Avalude Janmam	AT Ummer
1994	Gandheevam	AT Ummer
1995	Pushpamangala	Manoharan
1995	Sundarimaare Sookshikkuka	AT Ummer
1996	Elam	G Devarajan
1996	Sangamasandhya	Chandrabose
1999	Devi I.P.S	Kumar Ganesh
2000	Indulekha	Samji Aaraattupuzha
2000	Monisha Ente Monalisa	T Rajendar
2000	Neelathadaakatthile Nizhalppakshikal	Aji Sharas
2001	Aayilyam Naalil	Raveendran, Kaithapram
2001	Ee Raavil	SP Venkitesh
2001	Malaramban	SP Venkitesh
2001	Swargavaathil	Darsan Raman
2002	Jagapoga	MG Radhakrishnan
2002	Level Cross	SP Venkitesh
2002	Naarmadippudava	M Jayachandran
2005	Mounam Sammatham (1990)	Ilayaraja
2006	Pathaaka	Thej Mervin
2009	Parayaan Marannathu	Arun Siddharth
2010	Naaleyaanu Thaalimangalam	Jayesh Stephen, Nawas Rahman
2011	Meghamalhar (Album)	Damodar Narayanan
