= Venalil Oru Mazha =

1979 film by Sreekumaran Thampi

- Directed by: Sreekumaran Thampi
- Screenplay by: Sreekumaran Thampi
- Story by: Mahendran
- Produced by: S. Kumar
- Starring: Madhu; Jayan; Sukumari; Srividya
- Cinematography: J. G. Vijayam
- Edited by: K. Narayanan
- Music by: M. S. Viswanathan
- Production company: Sastha Movies
- Distributed by: Sastha Movies
- Release date: 13 January 1979
- Country: India
- Language: Malayalam

Venalil Oru Mazha (English: A Rain in the Summer) is a 1979 Indian Malayalam-language film directed by Sreekumaran Thampi and produced by S. Kumar. The film stars Madhu, Jayan, Sukumari and Srividya in the lead roles. The film has musical score by M. S. Viswanathan. The film was a remake of the Tamil film Mullum Malarum (1978).

== Plot ==
Vasu adores his younger sister Janu. It is at her insistence that he helps Kamalakshi and her mother find employment at the power station where he works as a trolley operator. Vasu can't stand the new engineer Raveendran but the engineer does not return his animosity. Matters grow worse when Vasu loses his hand in an accident when he got drunk after being suspended from duty by Raveendran for a few days. A remorseful Raveendran helps with his treatment and tries to gift money at Vasu's wedding with Kamalakshi. But Vasu's hatred only deepens. Not even the fact that his sister Janu is in love with Raveendran is enough to change Vasu's mind. He declines Raveendran's marriage proposal publicly and fixes her marriage elsewhere. His wife Kamalakshi decides that this vendetta is pointless and persuades Raveendran and Janu to elope. Vasu stops them on the way to the wedding and emotionally manipulates Janu into choosing her brother over her lover. However he changes his mind and decides that Janu's happiness is worth more than his hatred for Raveendran and gives his permission for the marriage.

== Cast ==
- Madhu as Vasu
- Jayan as Engineer Raveendran
- Srividya as Kamalakshi
- Sukumari as Teashop owner
- Sreelatha Namboothiri as Sukumari's daughter
- Poojappura Ravi as Shopkeeper
- Roja Ramani as Janu

== Soundtrack ==
All lyrics are written by Sreekumaran Thampi; all music is composed by M. S. Viswanathan.

No.	Title	Artist(s)	Length
1.	"Akaasham Akaleyennaaru"	Vani Jairam
2.	"Ayala Porichathundu"	L. R. Eeswari
3.	"Ente Rajakottaarathinu"	K. J. Yesudas
4.	"Ethu Panthal Kandaalum"	Vani Jairam
5.	"Poojakkorungi Nilkkum"	K. J. Yesudas
