= Maamaankam =

Mamankam
- Directed by: Navodaya Appachan
- Written by: N. Govindankutty
- Screenplay by: N. Govindankutty
- Produced by: Navodaya (a partnership concern)
- Starring: Prem Nazir; Jayan; Jose Prakash; Alummoodan
- Cinematography: Marcus Bartley
- Edited by: T. R. Sekhar
- Music by: K. Raghavan
- Production company: Navodaya ( a partnership concern)
- Distributed by: Navodaya ( a partnership concern)
- Release date: 24 August 1979
- Country: India
- Language: Malayalam

Maamaankam is a 1979 Indian Malayalam-language historical drama film directed and produced by Navodaya (a partnership concern). It is based on the medieval Mamankam festival held every 12 years at the banks of river Bharathappuzha in Tirunavaya, Southern India. Written by N. Govindankutty, the film stars Prem Nazir, Jayan, Jose Prakash and Alummoodan in the lead roles. The film has musical score by K. Raghavan.

== Plot ==
It is Chanthunni's greatest wish to go to the Mamankam and fight for the sake of his King Valluvakonathiri against the Samoothiri. However his uncle and guru wishes him to wait until the next Mamankam. And his childhood love Manka is the daughter of the Chief Minister of Samuthiri. Aiding Chanthunni is his best friend Moosa, who is also his uncle's disciple. Moosa captures Koya, a spy from the Samoothiri's camp, but is promptly tricked and captured by a rescue team led by Suhara, Koya's daughter. Suhara falls in love with Moosa while he's a prisoner. But her divided loyalties between her lover and her father may spell doom for either one of them. And Chanthunni has no intention of obeying his uncle to wait for another 12 years for the next Mamankam.

== Cast ==
- Prem Nazir as Chanthunni
- Jayan as Moosa
- Jose Prakash Manavikraman
- Alummoodan
- Ambika as Manipennu
- Kaviyoor Ponnamma as Chanthunni's mother
- Balan K. Nair
- Ceylon Manohar as Komappan
- K. R. Vijaya as Manka
- Poojappura Ravi as Zamorin's Warrior
- Bhavani as Suhara
- Kaduvakulam Antony as Velappan
- M. N. Nambiar as Thanayanjeri Pandhya Perumal
- Cochin Haneefa as Vellodi
- Sukumari as Cherutti
- G. K. Pillai as Thrithalakkal Gurukkal
- Nellikode Bhaskaran as Koya

== Soundtrack ==
The music was composed by K. Raghavan and the lyrics were written by P. Bhaskaran.

No.	Song	Singers	Lyrics	Length (m:ss)
1	"Adithozhunnen"	K. J. Yesudas, Vani Jairam	P. Bhaskaran	
2	"Kaarthika Maasathe" (Bit)	Chorus	P. Bhaskaran	
3	"Maamaankam"	K. J. Yesudas	P. Bhaskaran	
4	"Nadanam Nadanam"	B. Vasantha	P. Bhaskaran	
5	"Theeraatha Dukhathil"	S. Janaki	P. Bhaskaran	
6	"Thrithaalappookkadavil"	K. J. Yesudas	P. Bhaskaran	
7	"Varutha Pachari"	K. J. Yesudas, Vani Jairam, Chorus	P. Bhaskaran	
