= Oru Raagam Pala Thaalam =

- Poster
- Directed by: M. Krishnan Nair
- Screenplay by: Dr. Pavithran
- Story by: G. Balasubramaniam
- Produced by: Srividya; George Thomas
- Starring: Madhu; Jayan; Srividya; Jagathy Sreekumar
- Cinematography: N. A. Thara
- Edited by: G. Venkittaraman
- Music by: M. S. Viswanathan
- Production company: TV Movies
- Release date: 1 September 1979
- Country: India
- Language: Malayalam

Oru Raagam Pala Thaalam (transl. One raga, many beats) is a 1979 Indian Malayalam-language film directed by M. Krishnan Nair. The film stars Madhu, Jayan, Srividya and Jagathy Sreekumar. It is a remake of the Tamil film Aalayamani (1962).

== Plot ==
The life of a poor, honest man changes when a wealthy businessman hires him,. However, the employer and employee fall in love with the same women, though neither of the two realizes that.

== Cast ==
- Madhu
- Jayan
- Srividya
- Jagathy Sreekumar
- Sankaradi
- Aranmula Ponnamma
- Balan K. Nair
- P. K. Abraham
- Reena
- T. P. Madhavan
- Vazhoor Rajan

== Soundtrack ==
The music was composed by M. S. Viswanathan with lyrics by Sreekumaran Thampi.

Song	Singers
"Janikkumpol Nammal"	P. Jayachandran
"Kanakachilankachaarthum"	Vani Jairam
"Thedivanna Vasanthame"	P. Jayachandran
