= Manushya Mrugam (1980 film) =

- Directed by: Baby
- Written by: Pappanamkodu Lakshmanan
- Screenplay by: Pappanamkodu Lakshmanan
- Produced by: Thiruppathi Chettiyar
- Starring: Jayan; Jayaprabha; Seema; Jagathy Sreekumar; Kaviyoor Ponnamma; Jose Prakash
- Cinematography: K. B. Dayalan
- Edited by: K. Sankunni
- Music by: K. J. Joy
- Production company: Evershine
- Distributed by: Evershine
- Release date: 17 December 1980
- Country: India
- Language: Malayalam

Manushya Mrugam (transl. Human Beast) is a 1980 Indian Malayalam-language drama film written by Pappanamkodu Lakshmanan, directed by Baby and produced by Thiruppathi Chettiyar under the banner of Evershine. The film is a remake of the 1975 Kannada film Daari Tappida Maga. It stars Jayan, Jayaprabha, Seema, Jagathy Sreekumar, Kaviyoor Ponnamma, and Jose Prakash. Its musical score was composed by K. J. Joy. It was released on 17 December 1980.

== Premise ==
The film tells the story of twin brothers, who were separated during childhood.

== Cast ==
- Jayan as Babu and Gopi
- Jayaprabha
- Seema
- Jagathy Sreekumar
- Kaviyoor Ponnamma
- Jose Prakash
- Manavalan Joseph
- Prathapachandran
- Janardanan as Chandran
- Jayaragini
- Jyothi Lakshmi
- Master Sandeep
- V. P. Nair
- Vijayalakshmi

== Box office ==
The film was commercial success and ran for more than 100 days in many theatres.

== Soundtrack ==
The music was composed by K. J. Joy and the lyrics were written by Pappanamkodu Lakshmanan. All songs were chartbusters, especially the song "Kasthoori Manmizhi", sung by K. J. Yesudas.

No.	Song	Singers	Lyrics	Length (m:ss)
1	"Ajantha Shilpangalil"	S. Janaki, P. Jayachandran, Chorus	Pappanamkodu Lakshmanan	
2	"Kasthoori Maanmizhi"	K. J. Yesudas, Chorus	Pappanamkodu Lakshmanan	
3	"Sneham Thaamara"	K. J. Yesudas	Pappanamkodu Lakshmanan	
