= Aavesham (1979 film) =

1979 film directed by Vijayanand

- Poster
- Directed by: Vijayanand
- Screenplay by: Manih Mohamed
- Starring: Jayan; Sheela; K. P. Ummer; M. N. Nambiar; Ceylon Manohar; Jayamalini
- Cinematography: Anandakuttan
- Music by: Songs: A. T. Ummer; Score: Guna Singh
- Production company: Sree Sabitha Films
- Release date: 19 November 1979
- Country: India
- Language: Malayalam

Aavesham (lit. 'Wild rage') is a 1979 Indian Malayalam-language film directed by Vijayanand. The film stars Jayan, Sheela, M. N. Nambiar, Ceylon Manohar and Jayamalini in the lead roles. The film has musical score by Guma Singh and songs by A. T. Ummer. The movie was rich with action scenes and Jayan played double role. This film was one of Jayan's popular and hit films.

== Cast ==
- Jayan as Gopi/Ravi (Double Role)
- Sheela as Susheela
- Ceylon Manohar
- Jayamalini as Rathi
- K. P. Ummer as Raghavan
- Kunchan
- M. N. Nambiar as Shekhar
- P. K. Abraham as Ammavan
- Mala Aravindan as Thirumeni
- Meena
- Cochin Haneefa
- T. P. Madhavan
- Thodupuzha Radhakrishnan as Thankappan
- N. Govindankutty as Moopan
- C. I. D. Sakunthala
- Master Kabeer

== Soundtrack ==
The film score was composed by Guna Singh while the songs were composed by A. T. Ummer with the lyrics were written by Bichu Thirumala.

Song	Singers
"Maan Maan Maan Nalla"	S. Janaki
"Mangalamuhoortham"	Vani Jairam
"Nambiyaambathimalanira"	K. J. Yesudas, Chorus
