= Jayan =

Indian actor (25 July 1939 – 16 November 1980)

- Born: Krishnan Nair; 25 July 1939; Quilon, Kingdom of Travancore, British India (present day Kollam, Kerala, India)
- Died: 16 November 1980 (aged 41); Madras, Tamil Nadu, India
- Cause of death: Helicopter crash (while filming Kolilakkam) at Sholavaram, Chennai
- Other name: Krishnan Nair
- Occupations: Naval officer; Actor
- Years active: 1972 – 1980
- Parents: Madhavan Pillai; Bharathiyamma
- Relatives: Jayabharathi (cousin)
- Military career
- Allegiance: India
- Branch: Indian Navy
- Service years: 1954 – 1970
- Rank: Master Chief Petty Officer

Master Chief Petty Officer Krishnan Madhavan Nair (25 July 1939 – 16 November 1980), better known by his stage name Jayan, born as the son of Madhavan Pillai and Bharathiyamma in Kollam, was an Indian actor, naval officer, and stunt performer of the 1970s and 1980s. He starred in over 150 Malayalam films, primarily as an action star. In 2010 he was referred to as the first and most successful action hero of Malayalam cinema.

His superstar image became a cartoon, email, and SMS phenomenon in the early 2000s, portraying him as a comic superhero with unique quotes of superhuman strength attributed to the action star becoming widespread. These movements were fuelled by a renewed fascination with his style of dialogue delivery and his machismo image. These were claimed to honour his memories, but were also criticised for parodying the actor years after his death.

== Early life ==
Jayan was born as Krishnan Nair, in Quilon, Travancore (present day Kollam, Kerala, India) as the first child of his father Thevalli Kottaram Veetil Madhavan Pillai and mother Bharathiyamma. He had a younger brother named Soman Nair. Malayalam actress Jayabharathi, who was his first cousin introduced him to the film industry.

Krishnan'a formal education ended at the 10th grade at Kollam Government Boys High School when he joined the Indian Navy. He was a member of the Indian Navy team to travelled to Great Britain in 1961 for taking India's first war ship INS Vikrant. He played for Navy football team. His first accolades for his acting skills reached him when he was a naval sailor.

Krishnan Nair served in the Indian Navy for 16 years, culminating in the rank of Master CPO. By the end of his navy days, he had begun efforts to start small businesses at Ernakulam and became a regular inhabitant of the Cochin Tourist Home. During his life at Ernakulam, he would meet some of his lifelong friends. It was such a chance meeting while on leave, with Rajan Prakash who is the veteran Malayalam actor Jose Prakash's son, who owned a dry cleaning shop in Cochin, that eventually landed him a role in the movie Shapa Moksham. A year later, he left the Indian Navy and started trying his hand at various civilian jobs, working for companies in Cochin for a few years till his acting career began to succeed.

== Career ==
=== Early career ===
Krishnan Nair made a few uncredited appearances in some films during the early 1970s. According to his nephew, he had the role of a vampire-like character in an unnamed project costarred by Vidhubala, which was never released.

=== Rise to fame ===
The name "Jayan" (transl. "The Victor") was given to him by veteran Malayalam actor Jose Prakash on the sets of Shapamoksham. Jayan got his first major break appearing as a villain in Panchami (1976), playing a forest ranger. Jayan's performance in this film was appreciated in the industry and his physical appearance was also noticed for the first time. His next notable role was in Thacholi Ambu (1978), in which he appeared in a supporting role. In the same year, he acted as a sage in the Sreekumaran Thampi film Etho Oru Swapnam, which was well received by critics. He also appeared in the 1978 horror film Lisa, in a supporting role. But what made Jayan a superstar was his antihero role in Sarapancharam (1979, Bed of Arrows). He catapulted to fame riding on machismo roles that endeared him to the masses, and he established himself as one of the most popular Malayalam film actors of his time with superhit movies like Chaakara (1980), Love in Singapore (1980), Paalattu Kunjikkannan (1980), Naayattu (1980), Manushya Mrugam (1980) and Angadi (1980) the latter of which was the highest-grossing film of the year. He is generally regarded as the first action hero in Malayalam cinema.

=== Superstardom ===
Sarapancharam broke all box-office records set in the Malayalam movie industry till it's time and became the highest-grossing movie of 1979. Its box-office records were broken by another Jayan film, Angadi in the following year, which cemented his popularity among the masses. In films such as Aavesham and Manushya Mrugam he played double roles. During his career, he received only a few critically appreciated roles perhaps partly due to his commercial hero image and partly due to the lack of films that garnered critical appreciation at the time. The focus was always on his unmatched drawing power as an action star and by 1980, at the peak of his career, he had attained a genuine superhero image. Movies exploited Jayan's masculine physique and he appeared bare-chested in numerous scenes. His on-screen attire (most famously his Elvis bellbottoms), his masculine image and later the nature of his death transformed him into a legendary pop culture icon in Kerala. Jayan was also known for his unique method of dialogue delivery and he has contributed many memorable lines to the Malayalam film history.

=== Multistar films ===
Jayan acted in several ensemble cast movies, mostly with Prem Nazir. The duo acted in films such as Naayattu, Love in Singapore, Chandrahasam, Thacholi Ambu, Kannappanunni, Paalattu Kunjikkannan, Maamaankam, Prabhu etc. all of which were top-grossing movies at the box office. He also acted with other popular actors of the time, such as Soman, Sukumaran and Madhu in many films. In early films before 1979 (e.g. Thacholi Ambu and Panchami), he had negative or supporting roles. But later films in the beginning of 1980 relied heavily on Jayan's drawing power as an action hero and placed him as the central character. In 1980, the duo Jayan and Prem Nazir were cast in Ariyapedatha Rahasiyam by P. Venu, that showcased the most famous fight scene in Malayalam cinema. Prem Nazir agreed to play a supporting role in Naayattu, which was very unlikely for a superstar of those times. He had agreed to do this as a token of friendship with Jayan and the director Sreekumaran Thambi. The duo acted together many action films such as Irumbazhikal, Love in Singapore etc. where the box office draw was huge.

== Death ==
This picture was taken seconds before the accident

On 16 November 1980, Jayan died in an accident on the set of the movie Kolilakkam (transl. Shockwave) at the age of 41. The climactic scene of the movie was being filmed in Sholavaram, near Madras, Tamil Nadu. Jayan was performing a stunt that involved him boarding an airborne Bell 47 from a moving motorbike driven by Sukumaran. The shot was accepted by the director in the first take; nonetheless, another three shots were filmed. According to the film's production executive, Jayan insisted on yet another re-take as he was not satisfied. During the re-take, the helicopter lost its balance and crashed along with Jayan who was hanging onto the landing skids, and he later succumbed to his injuries.

After his death was confirmed, a slide was added during the theatre show of his movie Deepam, informing viewers of his death. Responses were mixed and some audiences believed it to be promotion for some upcoming project.

Jayan's body was taken to Trivandrum via aeroplane and later it was taken to his home in Quilon, where he was cremated. Thousands paid homage to the actor. Some conspiracy theories emerged regarding the circumstances of his death, primarily because the pilot and his co-star Balan K. Nair, who was in the helicopter, survived with minor or no injuries.

== Aftermath ==
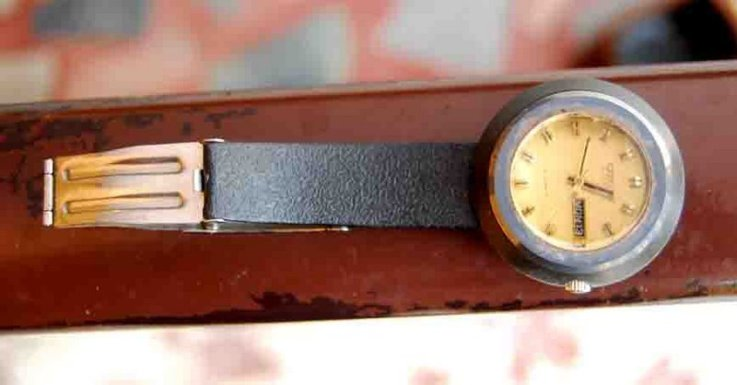
The Citizen watch that Jayan had used during the shoot of the film Kolilakkam

After Jayan's death, several films were released claiming to be his last film, including Kolilakkam. In all these films, Jayan's voice was dubbed by Alleppey Ashraf, a popular impressionist of the time. Many projects meant for him were recast, such as Thushaaram by I. V. Sasi, P. G. Vishwambaran's Sphodanam, and J. Sasikumar's Dhruvasangamam. Numerous other projects were cancelled entirely. One stunt scene and two songs were already shot with Jayan for C. V. Rajendran's Garjanam, but after his death, it was recast with Rajinikanth, becoming his second film in Malayalam released in 1981.

=== Imposter Movement ===
Due to his popularity, random bit scenes were added to films that showed random gestures or shots of him walking by the side during fight scenes. Attempts were made to bring in impostors who tried to imitate his style and mannerisms, enabling several artists from the field of mimicry to show up on the big screen. But these experiments failed miserably, and proved especially ineffective in fight and stunt scenes. Then, directors and producers started a search for new actors to replace him. This movement led to debuts of actors who resembled Jayan, those with stage names sounding similar to his (for example, his own brother who appeared as Ajayan), and those with similar mannerisms and style (e.g. Bheeman Raghu).

=== Resurgence in the 2000s ===
In the late 1990s and early 21st century, there was a resurgence of Jayan's screen persona in Kerala and his old movie scenes came to prominence again.

A film titled Avatharam presently under production, is attempting to bring back his screen persona using advanced technologies. A documentary on Jayan's life and death Jayan – The Man behind the Legend is nearing completion for release in the near future.

== Legacy ==
=== Superhero image and commercial success ===
Jayan is the most commercially successful superstar to date in the Malayalam industry with a near 90% success rate. The years 1979, 1980 and 1981 became known as "Jayan years" in the industry due to the widespread release and success of his movies. His films Sharapancharam and Angadi, released in 1979 and 1980 respectively, were record breakers and became the highest grossers of their respective years. His final film, Kolilakkam was the highest grosser in 1981. The noteworthy point is that a large percentage of films released during his peak years lacked a strong plot and were mostly cheap low budget remakes of successful movies from other language sectors of Indian cinema. Many of these films came out astoundingly successful due to his sheer presence and some avoided failures due to his small cameo appearances. Thousands of fans used to visit theatres repeatedly just to see his fascinating stunts and fight scenes.

=== Stunt work ===
Jayan was a high-risk taker and throughout his career, he was popular for stellar performances in a fight and stunt sequences. Dangerous and thrilling stunts were often featured in action films with Jayan in the lead. These were usually highlighted during fight scenes as added promotions to his machismo image and daredevilry. Numerous movies in which he has acted have one or more notable stunt performances.

The famed ship crane stunt in the film Chandrahaasam

A few prominent examples may be Puthiya Velicham ("New Light", 1979) in which he performs train stunts jumping onto and from a fast-running goods train, Aavesham ("Inspiration", 1979) which shows the actor swimming through the dangerous waters of Hogenakkal Falls, through a major part of the climax sequence without using any kind of safety measures. Movies like Thadavara ("Prison", 1981) and Sharapancharam (1979) demonstrate his brilliant horse riding skills performing almost effortlessly on horseback, while films like Maamaankam involved dangerous fights with wild animals. In a film called Moorkhan ("Cobra", 1981) he broke through a brick wall riding on a motorbike (a Royal Enfield Bullet) and it also featured sequences that had the actor sliding along ropes tied at high elevations.

=== Memorable roles ===
Most critics often consider Jayan's main hero role in Sharapancharam, Angadi, Venalil Oru Mazha and Puthiya Velicham to be his best. His most popular character may be the educated labourer in Angadi. The sage's role played by him in Etho Oru Swapnam was well appreciated by critics and would easily feature among his most memorable roles. The supporting role in Kannappanunni, Thacholi Ambu, the villainous ranger in Panchami and the rapist in Kanthavalayam are also critically acclaimed performances. Some other popular roles were in films like Idimuzhakkam, Venalil Oru Mazha, Ithikkara Pakki, Maamaankam, Puthiya Velicham, Karimpana, Ariyapedatha Rahasiyam, Chaakara and Kazhukan. While acknowledging his undisputed popularity as a commercial superstar that has never faded over time, general critical opinion on his skills as an actor is divided.

== Memorials ==
Kollam District panchayath and Government of Kerala built a new conference hall near to Kollam District panchayath office in Kollam municipal corporation as a memorial to the actor. The hall is named as "Jayan Memorial Hall". It was inaugurated on 12 September 2020.

=== Jayan Cultural Forum ===
Jayan Samskarika Vethi or Jayan Cultural Forum has been established recently, which consists of his fans and well wishers. It is headed by the actor's nephew Kannan Nair, and aims at uniting his fan base under a single platform. Activities include organising anniversary functions and memorial programs, facilitating his coworkers, maintaining the actor's website and official profiles and charity work.

=== Monuments ===
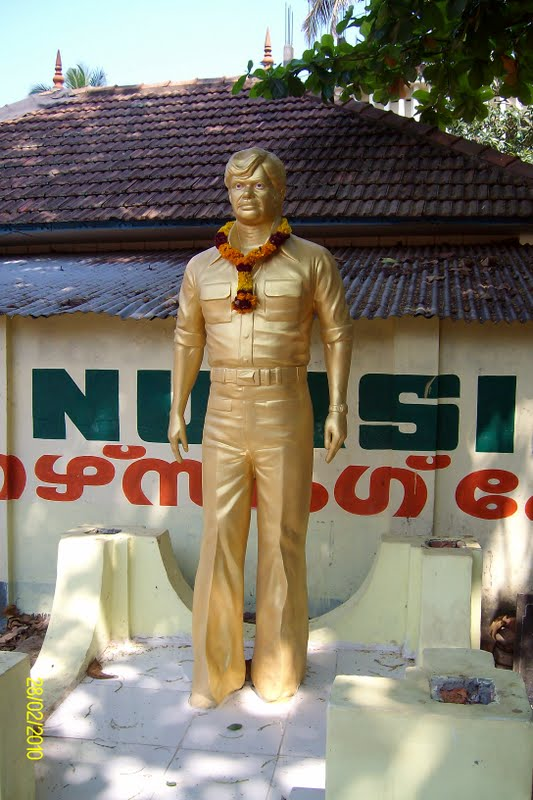
Jayan's statue at his birthplace Olayil in Kollam

In 2009, an 8 ft high statue of the actor was erected in front of his house at Olayil, Kollam, which is now a nursing home.

Jayan's wax statue was unveiled at the Sunil Wax Museum in the state capital of Thiruvananthapuram in 2022.

== In media ==
=== Media on Jayan ===
- A book titled Jayan Americayil? (Jayan in America?) came out in 1981. It circulated the rumour that Jayan was alive in America with an injured eye and that it was a look-alike who was killed in the accident.
- Another book Jayante Maranam Kolapathakamo (Jayan's death, a murder) was also published in 1981, capitalising on the conspiracy theories and mystery surrounding the superstar's death.
- The actor's life was serialised in a Malayalam film magazine and then brought out as Jayante Katha.

=== In popular culture ===
==== Print media ====
- The actor's domination and commercial success in the 1970s is mentioned in the book Because I have a Voice. It focuses on Jayan's masculine image.
- Jayan's famous emotional English dialogue in street slang is included at number 7 in Outlook magazine's Terrific 13 lists published in the 13th anniversary edition of the magazine, in the section '13 Cheesiest Chalkiest dialogues in Indian Cinema'.

==== Films ====
- In the movie Aye Auto, there is a reference to Jayan's English dialogue in Angadi.
- The movies Dupe Dupe Dupe and Aparanmaar Nagarathil had Jayan impersonators in the lead.
- In the film Pattanathil Bhootham, the popular Jayan song sequence Cham Chacha Chumchacha is played out with impersonation. The horse oiling scene from Sarapancharam is also reconstructed.
- In Chotta Mumbai, a Jayan-Nazir mixed song sequence is played out with Jayan attire used in the song sequence of the popular Nazir song Chettikulangara.
- In the film Shikkar, Jayan's image is used in the sets of a fight scene in a bid to stress the adventurous setting of the film.
- In Thanthonni, Jayan's voice and dialogue tone is imitated.
- The film Valiyangadi was promoted as a sequel to Jayan's Angadi.
- In the film Ennu Ninte Moideen, Jayan's stunt sequence and the celebrated row with "Alavalathi Shaji" from the film Lisa is shown in a theatre scene.
- The famous song "Kannum Kannum" from Jayan's film Angadi is included with Mammooty impersonating Jayan's style in the film Venicile Vyapari.
- The recent hit Kattappanayile Rithwik Roshan has the actor Siddique acting as an ardent fan of Jayan and impersonates his style for seeing his movies.

==== Return to the silver screen ====
In December 2010, on the occasion of the 30th anniversary of his death, it was announced that a new movie with Jayan in the lead is in the works, using advanced animation and graphics technologies. The movie, titled Avatharam (Incarnation), was announced to be directed by Vijeesh Mani and scripted by T. A. Shahid. The project is inspired by the star's posthumous popularity as an action legend. It was announced that the actor would be brought back to the big screen by twelve top technicians from Hollywood.

== Filmography ==
Year	Title	Role
1974	Shapamoksham	
1974	Poonthenaruvi	Dr John
1975	Tourist Bungalow	
1975	Sooryavamsham	
1975	Ullasayathra	
1976	Dharmakshetre Kurukshetre	
1976	Pick Pocket	Chandran's father
1976	Madhuram Thirumadhuram	Babu
1976	Rajanganam	
1976	Agnipushpam	
1976	Mallanum Mathevanum	
1976	Panchami	John
1976	Kamadhenu	Madhavan
1976	Amrithavahini	Mohan
1977	Snehayamuna	
1977	Makam Piranna Manka	
1977	Ashirvadam	
1977	Manassoru Mayil	
1977	Tholkan Enikku Manassilla	
1977	Aadhya Paadam	
1977	Aparajitha	
1977	Ivanente Priyaputhran	
1977	Shukradasha	
1977	Kaavilamma	
1977	Abhinivesham	Gopinath
1977	Aval Oru Devalayam	
1977	Anjali	
1977	Rajaparambara	
1977	Rathi Manmadhan	Sekharan
1977	Randu Lokam	Babu
1977	Ormakal Marikkumo	Prabhakaran
1977	Itha Ivide Vare	Boatman
1977	Achaaram Ammini Osharam Omana	Sudhakaran
1977	Kannappanunni	Hidumban
1978	Pavadakkari	
1978	Hemantharaathri	
1978	Avakasham	
1978	Anubhoothikalude Nimisham	
1978	Aval Kanda Lokam	
1978	Anumodanam	
1978	Randu Penkuttikal	
1978	Snehikkan Samayamilla	
1978	Vishwaroopam	
1978	Orkkuka Vallappozhum	
1978	Madanolsavam	Dr. Jayakumar
1978	Midukkipponnamma	
1978	Shathrusamharam	
1978	Adimakkachavadam	Ponnamma's lover
1978	Pattalam Janaki	
1978	Asthamayam	
1978	Kalpavriksham	Gopi
1978	Kanyaka	Ayyappan
1978	Etho Oru Swapnam	VV Swami/Vasudevan
1978	Thacholi Ambu	Bappu, Kutty
1978	Soothrakkari	
1978	Mattoru Karnan	
1978	Kaathirunna Nimisham	Venu
1978	Jayikkanayi Janichavan	Prabhakara Varma
1978	Itha Oru Manushyan	Prabha
1978	Iniyum Puzha Ozhukum	Nambiar
1978	Ee Manohara Theeram	Sahadevan
1978	Adavukal Pathinettu	
1978	Aana Paachan	Paramu
1978	Mukkuvane Snehicha Bhootham	Krishnankutty
1978	Kadathanattu Maakkam	Unni Kurup
1978	Lisa	Suresh
1979	Raathrikal Ninakku Vendi	
1979	Kallu Karthyayani	
1979	Pichathy Kuttappan	Raghu
1979	Sikharangal	Ramesh
1979	Pushyaraagam	
1979	Sandhyaragam	
1979	Pennorumbettaal	
1979	Oru Raagam Pala Thaalam	Raju
1979	Saayoojyam	Rajan
1979	Sharapancharam	Chandrasekharan
1979	Vellayani Paramu	Jambulingam
1979	Puthiya Velicham	Venu
1979	Prabhu	Vishwanathan
1979	Mochanam	Balachandran
1979	Maamaankam	Moosa
1979	Ivide Kattinu Sugandam	Jayadevan
1979	Sarpam	James
1979	Irumbazhikal	Babu
1979	Venalil Oru Mazha	Raveendran
1979	Kazhukan	Venu
1979	Chuvanna Chirakukal	
1979	Avano Atho Avalo	C.I.D.Prakash
1979	Anupallavi	Suresh
1979	Angakkuri	Ramachandran
1979	Aavesham	Gopi/Ravi
1980	Sakthi	Vijayan/Rajan Varma
1980	Chandrahasam	Appu
1980	Theenalangal	Ramu
1980	Paalattu Kunjikannan	Vanchiyoor Surasu
1980	Ithikkara Pakki	Adimakkannu
1980	Naayattu	Inspector Vijayan
1980	Kaanthavalayam	Manushyan
1980	Angadi	Babu
1980	Karimbana	Muthan
1980	Idimuzhakkam	Bheeman
1980	Meen	Rajan
1980	Karipuranda Jeevithangal	Raghavan
1980	Anthapuram	Vasu
1980	Love in Singapore	Suresh
1980	Chaakara	Sethumadhavan
1980	Pottatha Poottukal	Uppuli
1980	Benz Vasu	Vasu
1980	Deepam	Ajaykumar
1980	Moorkhan	Vinod
1980	Manushya Mrugham	Babu/Gopi
1981	Thadavara	Rajan
1981	Kolilakkam	Babu
1981	Aakramanam	
1981	Abhinayam	Raghu
1981	Garjanam	
1981	Agnisaram	
1981	Sanchari	Bhargavan
1981	Ariyappedatha Rahasyam	Raghu
1982	Komaram	
1982	Ente Sathrukkal	
1983	Ahankaram	Suresh
1983	Panchapandavar (Unreleased)	

== See also ==
- Jayan quotes
