= Kazhukan =

- Directed by: A. B. Raj
- Written by: K. Balachander; A. B. Raj (dialogues)
- Screenplay by: A. B. Raj
- Based on: Thappida Thala/Thappu Thalangal (1978)
- Starring: Jayan; Shubha; Sukumaran; Jagathy Sreekumar
- Cinematography: N. A. Thara
- Edited by: K. Sankunni
- Music by: M. K. Arjunan
- Production company: Kalaranjini Films
- Distributed by: Kalaranjini Films
- Release date: 30 November 1979
- Country: India
- Language: Malayalam

Kazhukan (transl. Falcon) is a 1979 Indian Malayalam-language film, directed by A. B. Raj. The film stars Jayan, Shubha, Sukumaran and Jagathy Sreekumar . The film has musical score by M. K. Arjunan. Sukumaran plays the antagonist. The film was a remake of the 1978 Kannada/Tamil bilingual Thappida Thala/Thappu Thalangal, directed by K. Balachander.

== Cast ==
- Jayan as Velu
- Shubha as Malathi
- Sukumaran as Gopi
- Bahadoor as Pimp Mani
- P. R. Varalakshmi as Pimp Mani's wife
- Jagathy Sreekumar as Amruthlal
- Paul Vengola as Pimp Vasu
- Philomina as Pimp Vasu's wife
- Sreelatha Namboothiri as Vimala
- Ceylon Manohar
- Kundara Johny
- Priya
- Jameela Malik
- Pushpa
- Vazhoor Rajan

== Soundtrack ==
The music was composed by M. K. Arjunan and the lyrics were written by Sreekumaran Thampi.

No.	Song	Singers	Lyrics	Length (m:ss)
1	"Chandanakkulirchoodivarum"	K. J. Yesudas	Sreekumaran Thampi	
2	"Enthinee Jeevithavesham"	K. J. Yesudas	Sreekumaran Thampi	
3	"Thaalam Thettiya Raagam"	K. J. Yesudas	Sreekumaran Thampi	
