= Prabhu (film) =

Prabhu (1979)
- Directed by: Baby
- Produced by: B. V. K. Nair for Mangalya Movie Makers
- Starring: Prem Nazir, Jayan, Seema, Jose Prakash, Bhasi, Kaviyoor Ponnamma etc.
- Cinematography: Indu
- Edited by: Paul Dorai Singam
- Music by: Shankar–Ganesh
- Release date: 21 September 1979
- Country: India
- Language: Malayalam

Prabhu is a 1979 Indian Malayalam-language film, directed by Baby. The film stars Prem Nazir, Jayan, Kaviyoor Ponnamma and Adoor Bhasi. The film's score was composed by Shankar–Ganesh.

== Cast ==
- Prem Nazir as Prabhu
- Jayan as Vishwanathan / Vishwam
- Kaviyoor Ponnamma as Devaki
- Adoor Bhasi as Amita Bhakshanam
- Jose Prakash
- Nellikode Bhaskaran
- Sasi
- Seema
- Surekha

== Soundtrack ==
The music was composed by Shankar–Ganesh with lyrics by Ettumanoor Sreekumar.

No.	Title	Artist(s)	Length
1.	"Aaramadevathamaare"	S. Janaki
2.	"Inneetheeram Thedum"	K. J. Yesudas
3.	"Laharee Anandalaharee"	K. J. Yesudas
4.	"Mundakankoythinu"	K. P. Chandramohan
