= Ivide Kattinu Sugandam =

- Directed by: P. G. Vishwambharan
- Written by: Kaloor Dennis; A. Sheriff (dialogues)
- Screenplay by: A. Sheriff
- Produced by: TV.Francis
- Starring: Jayan; Jayabharathi; Srividya; Sankaradi
- Cinematography: C. Ramachandra Menon
- Edited by: V. P. Krishnan
- Music by: K. J. Joy; Lyrics: Bichu Thirumala
- Production company: Yuvachetana films
- Distributed by: Yuvachetana films
- Release date: 12 October 1979
- Country: India
- Language: Malayalam

Ivide Kattinu Sugandam is a 1979 Indian Malayalam film, directed by P. G. Vishwambharan. The film stars Jayan, Jayabharathi, Srividya and Sankaradi in the lead roles. The film has musical score by K. J. Joy.

== Plot ==
Jayadevan( Jayan) mistrusts women because of his unfaithful stepmother, however he is persuaded to put aside his suspicions. He marries Indu (Jayabharathi) whom he loves very much, but about whom he is also very possessive. One day he gets a letter from Indu's house which had been written by his brother Gopi to Indu. Jayadevan gets shocked and suspects her though she knows nothing about it. At the climax Jayadevan realizes she is telling the truth and apologizes to Indu.

== Cast ==
- Jayan as Jayadevan/Jayan
- Jayabharathi as Indu
- M. G. Soman as Gopi
- Sankaradi as Sreedharan Menon
- Sathaar as Ravi
- Aranmula Ponnamma as Jayadevan's grandmother
- Bahadoor as Raman Pilla
- K. P. A. C. Azeez
- Kuthiravattam Pappu as Pushkaran
- Thodupuzha Vasanthy as Sarojam
- Urmila as Sunitha

== Soundtrack ==
The music was composed by K. J. Joy and the lyrics were written by Bichu Thirumala.

No..	Song	Singers	Length (m:ss)
1	"Poonthenaruvi Ponmudi"	P. Susheela	
2	"Swapna Sancharini ninte"	P. Susheela, B. Vasantha	
3	"Neelaaranyam Poonthukil"	K. J. Yesudas, Vani Jairam	
4.	"Ivide Kaattinu Sugandham"	K. J. Yesudas S. Janaki	
