= Pushyaraagam =

- Directed by: C. Radhakrishnan
- Written by: C. Radhakrishnan
- Screenplay by: C. Radhakrishnan
- Produced by: V.V. Antony
- Starring: Madhu; Jayan; Jayabharathi; Sheela
- Cinematography: K. B. Dayalan
- Edited by: G. Venkittaraman
- Music by: A. T. Ummer
- Production company: Universal Movies
- Distributed by: Universal Movies
- Release date: 30 November 1980
- Country: India
- Language: Malayalam

Pushyaraagam is a 1979 Indian Malayalam family entertainer directed by C. Radhakrishnan The film stars Madhu, Jayan, Sharada in the lead roles. The film has musical score by A. T. Ummer.

== Cast ==
- Jayan as Shekhar
- K. P. Ummer as Sreedharan
- Ravi Kumar as Venu
- Sharada as Saraswathi
- Girija as Lakshmi
- Silk Smitha as Hotel Dancer
- Balan K Nair as Inspector
- Vallathol Unnikrishan as Shekara Pilla
- Madhu as Doctor Prakash – (Guest appearance)
- Kaviyoor Ponnamma as Amma

== Soundtrack ==
The music was composed by A. T. Ummer and the lyrics were written by Cheramangalam and Sakunthala Rajendran.

No.	Song	Singers	Lyrics	Length (m:ss)
1	"Madhuramadhuramoru"	Vani Jairam	Cheramangalam	
2	"Munthirithenozhukum Saarangame"	K. J. Yesudas	Cheramangalam	
3	"Oru Manikingini"	K. J. Yesudas, S. Janaki	Sakunthala Rajendran	
4	"Pathupetta"	S. Janaki	Sakunthala Rajendran	
