= Kolilakkam =

- Promotional poster
- Directed by: P. N. Sundaram
- Written by: C. V. Hariharan; Melattur Ravivarmma (dialogue)
- Produced by: C. V. Hariharan
- Starring: Jayan; Madhu; Sukumaran
- Cinematography: A. K. Mohan, Ranganathan
- Edited by: L. Bhoominathan, M. Umanath
- Music by: M. S. Viswanathan
- Distributed by: Suguna Screen Release
- Release date: 13 February 1981
- Running time: 167 minutes
- Country: India
- Language: Malayalam

Kolilakkam (transl. Shockwave) is a 1981 Malayalam-language action thriller film, written and directed by P. N. Sundaram, and starring Jayan. The film was a box office hit. The movie was a remake of the 1965 Hindi film Waqt.

== Premise ==
Three brothers, who were separated at birth, face several trials and tribulations when they try to make an effort to reunite.

== Cast ==
- Jayan
- Madhu
- Sukumaran
- M.G. Soman
- K. P. Ummer
- Balan K. Nair
- K. R. Vijaya
- Sumalatha
- M. N. Nambiar
- Sankaradi
- Sreelatha Namboothiri
- Kunjan
- Meena
- Ceylon Manohar
- K. P. A. C. Sunny
- P. K. Abraham
- T. P. Madhavan

== Production ==
This picture was taken seconds before the accident

On 16 November 1980, Jayan was killed in an accident on the set of Kolilakkam. The climax scene of the film was being filmed in Sholavaram, near Chennai, Tamil Nadu. Jayan performed his own stunt that involved him boarding an airborne helicopter from a moving motorbike. Jayan insisted on another take as he was not satisfied. During the take, the pilot lost control and crashed the helicopter while Jayan was hanging below, leading to his death.
