= Chuvanna Chirakukal =

- Directed by: N Sankaran Nair
- Written by: T.Damodaran (dialogues)
- Produced by: ERALY Co- Producer = MONAYI ERALY
- Starring: Jayan; Jayabharathi; M. G. Soman; Sharmila Tagore
- Cinematography: J. Williams
- Edited by: Vipin Das
- Music by: A.T Ummer; Salil Chowdhary
- Production company: Murali Movies
- Distributed by: Murali Movies
- Release date: 4 August 1978
- Country: India
- Language: Malayalam

Chuvanna Chirakukal is a 1978 Indian Malayalam-language film, directed by N. Sankaran Nair and produced by . The film stars Jayan, Jayabharathi, M. G. Soman and Sharmila Tagore . The film has musical score by Salil Chowdhary.

== Cast ==
- Jayan as Sunny Augustine IAS
- Jayabharathi as Stella Mathews
- M. G. Soman as Johnny Issac
- Sharmila Tagore as Jessinta Issac
- M.G Soman as James Augustine
- Raghavan as Thomaskutty
- Balan K Nair as Mathewson
- Ravikumar as Rajkumar IPS
- Srividhya as Sofy Thomas
- Jose Prakash as Issac Johnson
- Master Raghu as Aldrin Thomas
- Kaviyoor Ponnamma as Annamma Augustine
- Prathap Chandhran as Augustine Fernandez IAS

== Soundtrack ==
The music was composed by Salil Chowdhary and the lyrics were written by ONV Kurup.

No.	Song	Singers	Lyrics	Length (m:ss)
1	"Parannupoy nee akale"	K.J Yesudas	O. N. V. Kurup	
2	"Neeyoromal"	K. J. Yesudas	O. N. V. Kurup	
3	"Yaaminee devee"	S. Janaki	O. N. V. Kurup	
4	"Bhoomi Nandhini Nin"	S. Janaki	O. N. V. Kurup	
