= Anupallavi (film) =

1979 film

- Directed by: Baby
- Written by: Vijayan; Balakrishnan (dialogues)
- Screenplay by: Baby
- Produced by: Reghu Kumar
- Starring: Jayan; Sukumari; Srividya; Balan Kattoor
- Cinematography: Vipin Das
- Edited by: K. Sankunni
- Music by: K. J. Joy; Lyrics: Bichu Thirumala; Vijayan
- Production company: Dheera
- Distributed by: Dheera
- Release date: 4 May 1979
- Country: India
- Language: Malayalam

Anupallavi is a 1979 Indian Malayalam film, directed by Baby and produced by Reghu Kumar and Dheera. The film stars Jayan, Sukumari, Srividya and Balan Kattoor in the lead roles. The film has musical score by K. J. Joy. The film has Jayan who is typically noted for his action hero roles display his flair for comedy.

== Plot ==
Suresh and Radha get married after a whirlwind romance. However, Suresh soon becomes enamored of the new typist Stella in his office. He spins tales to convince Stella that his wife is a bed-ridden invalid with a terrible temper. He also helps Stella with the treatment of her sick father. Radha soon learns that her husband is enamored of another woman, while Stella learns that Suresh had been feeding her lies.

== Cast ==
- Jayan as Suresh
- Srividya as Radha
- Seema as Stella
- Sukumari
- Balan Kattoor
- Kuthiravattam Pappu
- Nellikode Bhaskaran
- Ravikumar
- Vallathol Unnikrishnan
- Bhavani
- Vijay Babu

== Soundtrack ==
The music was composed by K. J. Joy and the lyrics were written by Bichu Thirumala and Vijayan.

No.	Song	Singers	Lyrics	Length (m:ss)
1	"Aayiram Maathalappookkal"	P. Jayachandran	Bichu Thirumala	
2	"En Swaram Poovidum"	K. J. Yesudas	Bichu Thirumala	
3	"Navamee Chandrikayil"	P. Susheela	Bichu Thirumala	
4	"Neeraattu En Maanasaraani"	P. Jayachandran, Vani Jairam	Vijayan	
5	"Ore Raaga Pallavi"	K. J. Yesudas, S. Janaki	Bichu Thirumala	
