= Ceylon Manohar =

Indian actor

- Born: Anthony Pillai Emmanuel Manoharan
- Died: January 22, 2018 (aged 73–74); Chennai, Tamil Nadu, India
- Occupations: playback singer, actor

Ceylon Manohar (Tamil: சிலோன் மனோகர்) (c. 1944 – 22 January 2018), popular name of A. E. Manoharan (Anthony Pillai Emmanuel Manoharan) also known as Surangani Manohar (Tamil: சுராங்கனி மனோகர்), was a pop singer and actor. He has played roles in Tamil films and other Sri Lankan Tamil works.

== Career ==
He is majorly known for the song "Surangani", which attained cult status in the 1970s and 1980s in Tamil Nadu.

Although he is best remembered as a singer, Manohar had his sights set on acting from a very young age. He began acting in plays when he was a student at St John's College in Jaffna in the 1960s. Like many Sri Lankans of his era, Manohar came to India to pursue his higher studies. While he was a BA student in Trichy, he would go regularly to what was then Madras to try and get a role in a film. At that time all he could manage was a minor role in Maanavan, a 1970 film produced by M M A Chinnappa Thevar.

Manohar moved back to Sri Lanka, where he first worked as a teacher and then decided to become a full-time singer. Sri Lankan music was undergoing a major transformation in the early 1970s when Manohar began performing regularly at major venues in the country. He was one of the pioneers of the country's new pop movement, where he combined Baila with elements of contemporary music. He sang with equal ease in Tamil, Sinhala and English.

His rendition of Surangani was made popular across the island by Sri Lankan Broadcasting Corporation (formerly Radio Ceylon), which in the 1970s had a loyal fan base in India. As soon as the song became popular in India, Manohar started making regular trips to Madras, and the roles in films came in slowly. Manohar got small roles in films including those that starred Sivaji Ganesan. He would go on to act in Telugu, Tamil, and Malayalam films, mostly playing the role of a villain. With his long curly hair, moustache and overweight frame, he fit the role of a ‘bad guy’ well at that time.

When he was living in Colombo, the Black July anti-Tamil riots hit the Sri Lankan capital and spread across the island. Manohar moved to India for a while and later shifted base to London, where he worked for the BBC's Tamil service. It would take two and a half decades for Manohar to act in a Malayalam film again, settling for a minor role in the Mammootty film Thuruppugulan.

== Personal life ==
He was Sri Lankan Tamil from his father's side and Indian Tamil from his mother's side. He made Chennai his permanent home and lived there after he stopped acting. His last few years were spent in and out of hospital and he had to undergo dialysis. Manohar died in the suburbs of Chennai at the age of 73–74 in 2018.

== Filmography ==
=== Telugu ===
- 1978 Mugguru Muggure as Peter
- 1978 Lawyer Viswanath as Shakha
- 1978 Adavi Manushulu
- 1978 Sahasavanthudu as Roger
- 1979 Seethe Ramudaithe as Robert
- 1979 Rangoon Rowdy
- 1979 Andadu Aagadu as Ranjith
- 1979 Sri Rama Bantu as Jacky
- 1979 Srungara Ramudu as Jaipal's henchman
- 1980 Challenge Ramudu as Vasthad
- 1980 Mama Allulla Saval as Michael
- 1980 Adrushtavanthudu as Bully at the bar
- 1980 Aarani Mantalu as David
- 1980 Asadhyulaku Asadhyudu as Yogesh
- 1981 Puli Bidda as Manohar
- 1981 Chattaniki Kallu Levu as John
- 1984 James Bond 999 as Raaka
- 1984 Pralaya Simham as Rabandhu Sodharudu
- 1984 Bangaru Kapuram
- 1984 Punyam Koddi Purushudu as Shaaka
- 1984 Idhe Naa Savaal as Simhachalam
- 1985 Jwala as Manohar
- 1985 Mayaladi as Goon in the lift fight
- 1985 Sanchalanam as Katthula Ratthaiah
- 1985 Punnami Ratri as Ganganna
- 1986 Sakkanodu as Charlie
- 1986 Vetagallu as Henchman with a scar
- 1986 Vijrumbhana as Rambrahmam
- 1987 Khaidi Nagamma as Bakasura
- 1988 Ukku Sankellu

=== Tamil ===
- 1966 Pasa Nila
- 1978 Vaadai Kaatru
- 1978 Mangudi Minor
- 1978 En Kelvikku Enna Bathil as Raja
- 1978 Manitharil Ithanai Nirangala
- 1980 Naan Potta Savaal
- 1980 Guru
- 1981 Thee
- 1981 Lorry Driver Rajakannu
- 1981 Amara Kaaviyam as Diwakar
- 1982 Sangili as Mangal Singh
- 1983 Neethibathi
- 1983 Kai Varisai
- 2003 Jay Jay
- 2004 Thendral
- 2005 Thotti Jaya

=== Malayalam ===
- 1978 Thacholi Ambu
- 1979 Aavesham
- 1979 Maamaankam
- 1979 Kazhukan
- 1980 Mr. Michael as Manohar
- 1980 Sakthi
- 1981 Kolilakkam
- 1981 Thadavara
- 1982 Padayottam
- 1985 Pournami Raavil 3D
- 2006 Thuruppugulan

=== Kannada ===
- 1980 Ondu Hennu Aaru Kannu as Crocodile
- 1982 Rudri
- 1983 Simha Gharjane as Manohar
- 1987 Huli Hebbuli as Kalinga

=== Hindi ===
- 1980 Morchha as Sharpshooter
- 1982 Main Intaquam Loonga as Manohar
- 1986 Dosti Dushmani
- 1988 Khatron Ke Khiladi

=== Sinhala ===
- 1977 Maruwa Samaga Wase

=== Serials ===
- Muhurthaam
- Anjali
- Athipookal
- Thirumathi Selvam (Nandhini's father)

=== Singer ===
- Kazhuvura Neeril - Mangudi Minor
- Pathala Pathala - Virumbugiren
- Kopithotta Mudhalali - Pilot Premnath
- Yaari Singari - Thotti Jaya
