= Puthiya Velicham =

- Poster
- Directed by: Sreekumaran Thampi
- Screenplay by: Sreekumaran Thampi
- Produced by: S. Kumar
- Starring: Jayan; Jayabharathi; Srividya; Jagathy Sreekumar
- Cinematography: N. A. Thara
- Edited by: K. Narayanan
- Music by: Salil Chowdhury
- Production company: Sastha Productions
- Release date: 12 October 1979
- Country: India
- Language: Malayalam

Puthiya Velicham (transl. New light) is a 1979 Indian Malayalam-language film, directed by Sreekumaran Thampi and produced by S. Kumar. The film stars Jayan, Jayabharathi, Srividya and Jagathy Sreekumar. It is a remake of the Hindi film Phool Aur Patthar.

== Cast ==
- Jayan as Venu
- Jose Prakash as John
- Jayabharathi as Lilli
- Srividya as Lakshmi
- Jagathy Sreekumar as Parippi vada
- Thikkurissy Sukumaran Nair as Lohithakshan Bagavathar
- Janardhanan
- Hari as Inspector Viswambaran
- Sankaradi as Panikkar
- Philomina as Althara Amma
- Lissy
- Sreelatha Namboothiri as Sindhu Bhairavi
- Meena
- Poojappura Ravi as Vaidhyar Keshavan Nair
- Master Raghu as Kochu Govindhan
- Usha Kumari as Dancer
- Jayamalini as Dancer
- Javadevi as Dancer
- Arur Sathyan
- Vijayaraj
- Jaggu
- Haripad Soman
- Aravindhakshan
- Gandhikuttan
- Sethu
- Radhakrishnan

== Soundtrack ==
The music was composed by Salil Chowdhury, with lyrics by Sreekumaran Thampi.

Song	Singers
"Aaraattukadavil"	P. Jayachandran
"Aararo Swapnajaalakam"	Ambili
"Chuvannapattum Thettippoovum"	P. Susheela, Chorus
"Jil Jil Jil Chilambanangi"	P. Susheela, P. Jayachandran
"Manasse Nin Ponnambalam"	S. Janaki
"Poovirinjallo"	K. J. Yesudas

== Box office ==
The film was commercial success.
