= Vallathol Unnikrishnan =

Indian actor in Malayalam movies

- Occupation: Film actor
- Years active: 1967-present

Vallathol Unnikrishnan is an Indian actor in Malayalam movies. He was equally good at handling comedy roles and character roles. He mainly acted in Malayalam and Tamil films during the 1970s and 1980s. He was also a theater artist.

== Partial filmography ==
- Boeing Boeing (1985) as Priest
- Collector Malathy (1967)
- Velliyazhcha (1969)
- Missi (1976)
- Vazhivilakku (1976)
- Sreemad Bhagavadgeetha (1977)
- Jagadguru Aadisankaran (1977)
- Lisa (1978)
- Simhaasanam (1979)
- Anupallavi (1979)
- Naayaattu (1980)
- Love In Singapore (1980)
- Abhinayam (1981)
- Karimpoocha (1981)
- Chilanthivala (1982) as Shankar
- Ankam (1983)
- Samrambham(1983)
- NH 47 (1984)
- Njan Piranna Nattil (1985)
- Kurukkan Rajavayi (1987)
- Maasmaram (1997)
- Kakkakuyil (2001)
- Saudaamini (2003)
- Vettam (2004)
- Velicham (2012)
