= Pichathy Kuttappan =

- Directed by: P. Venu
- Written by: Sasikala Venu; N. Govindankutty (dialogues)
- Screenplay by: N. Govindankutty
- Starring: Prem Nazir; Jayan; Sheela; Sharada
- Cinematography: C. J. Mohan
- Edited by: K. Sankunni
- Music by: K. Raghavan
- Production company: SDM Combines
- Distributed by: SDM Combines
- Release date: 26 January 1979
- Country: India
- Language: Malayalam

Pichathy Kuttappan is a 1979 Indian Malayalam-language film, directed by P. Venu. The film stars Prem Nazir, Jayan, Sheela and Sharada. The film's score was composed by K. Raghavan.

== Cast ==
- Prem Nazir as Pichathy Kuttappan
- Jayan as Raghu
- Prameela as Lekha
- Sharada as Thankamma
- KPAC Lalitha
- Sukumari as Saraswathi
- Jose Prakash as Raman Muthalali
- Alummoodan as Paropakari Narayanan
- Bahadoor as Paachan
- Kaduvakulam Antony
- Mallika Sukumaran
- P. K. Abraham
- Sreelatha Namboothiri as CID Radha
- Sam (A.T.Samuel)
- Poojappura Ravi as Pappan

== Soundtrack ==
The music was composed by K. Raghavan with lyrics by Yusufali Kechery.

No.	Song	Singers	Lyrics	Length (m:ss)
1	"Annanada Ponnala"	S. Janaki, Chorus	Yusufali Kechery	
2	"Daaham Njaanoru Daaham"	K. J. Yesudas	Yusufali Kechery	
3	"Moovanthi Nerathu"	P. Jayachandran, Chorus	Yusufali Kechery	
4	"Odivarum Kaattil"	P. Susheela	Yusufali Kechery	
5	"Punchiriyo"	P. Jayachandran	Yusufali Kechery	
