= Sarapancharam =

- Poster
- Directed by: Hariharan
- Screenplay by: Hariharan
- Story by: Malayattoor Ramakrishnan
- Produced by: G. P. Balan
- Starring: Jayan; Sheela; Sathaar; Latha
- Cinematography: Melli Irani
- Edited by: V. P. Krishnan
- Music by: Devarajan
- Distributed by: Angel Films
- Release date: 28 March 1979
- Country: India
- Language: Malayalam

Sarapancharam (transl. cage of arrows) is a 1979 Indian Malayalam-language drama film written and directed by Hariharan from a story by Malayattoor Ramakrishnan. It stars Jayan, Sheela, and Sathaar and Latha, with P. K. Abraham and Oduvil Unnikrishnan in supporting roles. Jayan played the role of the main antagonist in the film. It was also one of the first notable films of Oduvil Unnikrishnan, who played the role of a lawyer. It was a breakthrough film in Jayan's career.

The story line of the film is loosely based on D. H. Lawrence's 1928 novel Lady Chatterley's Lover, though there are significant differences in plot and characterisation. The film was the highest-grossing Malayalam film of 1979.

== Cast ==
- Jayan as Chandrasekharan
- Sheela as Saudhamini
- Priya (Sarapancharam actress) as Baby
- Sathaar as Prabhakaran
- P. K. Abraham as Saudamini's Husband
- Nellikkodu Bhaskaran as Sidhayyan
- Oduvil Unnikrishnan as Subbaiyer
- Baby Sumathi as Young Baby
- Kottayam Shantha
- Bhaskara Kurup as Chellappan
- Jayachandran as Baby's Boyfriend Ramesh
- Sarath Babu as Baby's Friend (Guest role)
- Shankar as Baby's friend
- Bhavani as Malli
- Rajan Padoor as Gopala Pilla
- Major Stanli as Young Prabhakaran

== Soundtrack ==
The music was composed by G. Devarajan and the lyrics were written by Yusufali Kechery.

No.	Song	Singers	Lyrics
1	"Ambalakkulathile"	K. J. Yesudas	Yusufali Kechery
2	"Malarinte Manamulla"	P. Madhuri	Yusufali Kechery
3	"Saaraswatha Madhuventhum"	Vani Jairam	Yusufali Kechery
4	"Sringaaram Virunnorukki"	P. Susheela	Yusufali Kechery
5	"Theyyaka Theyyaka"	P. Jayachandran, P. Madhuri	Yusufali Kechery

== Box office ==
This film was commercial success and a breakthrough film in Jayan's career. The dialogues and body language of Jayan was well received. He began appearing in prominent leading roles thereafter. It was the highest-grossing Malayalam film at that time.

== Remake ==
Director Hariharan remade the film in Hindi as Anjaam (1986).
