= List of Malayalam films of 1983 =

The following is a list of Malayalam films released in the year 1983.

Opening		Sl. no.	Film	Cast	Director	Lyricist	Music director	Notes
J A N	7	1	Mazha Nilaavu	Prem Nazir, Shanavas	S. A. Salam		Raveendran	
J A N	14	2	Pourasham	M. G. Soman, Sukumaran	J. Sasikumar		A. T. Ummer	
J A N	14	3	Enikku Vishakunnu	Nedumudi Venu, Ambika	P. Bhaskaran		Jaya Vijaya	
J A N	21	4	Veena Poovu	Nedumudi Venu, Sankar Mohan	Ambili		Vidyadharan	
J A N	21	5	Bhookambam	Prem Nazir, Srividya	Joshiy	Bichu Thirumala	Shankar–Ganesh	
J A N	24	6	Hello Madras Girl	Shankar, Madhavi	J. Williams		Gangai Amaran	
J A N	24	7	Enne Njan Thedunnu	Madhu, Shubha	P. Chandrakumar	Bichu Thirumala	A. T. Ummer	
J A N	28	8	Justice Raja	Prem Nazir, Menaka	R. Krishnamoorthy		Gangai Amaran	
F E B	4	9	Theeram Thedunna Thira	Prem Nazir, Mammootty, Ratheesh	A. Vincent		Shyam	
F E B	11	10	Charam	Prem Nazir, Meena Menon	P. A. Bakker		Shankar Jaikishan	
F E B	11	11	Sandhyakku Virinja Poovu	Mammootty, Seema	P. G. Viswambharan		Ilaiyaraaja	
F E B	18	12	Himam	Prem Nazir, Shankar	Joshiy	Bichu Thirumala, Mankombu Gopalakrishnan	Shyam	
F E B	18	13	Pallamkuzhi	Roopa, V. Sambasivan	M. N. Sreedharan		K. Raghavan	
F E B	25	14	Kuyiline Thedi	Rohini, Master Raghu	M. Mani		Shyam	
M A R	4	15	Thaalam Thettiya Tharattu	Menaka, Rajkumar	A. B. Raj		Raveendran	
M A R	4	16	Himavaahini	Mammootty, Mohanlal	P. G. Vishwambharan		G. Devarajan	
M A R	4	17	Naseema	Mohanlal, Nedumudi Venu	A Sheriff		Johnson	
M A R	9	18	Guru Dakshina	Ratheesh, Mammootty, Mohanlal	Baby		Joy	
M A R	10	19	Rachana	Srividya, Nedumudi Venu	Mohan		M. B. Sreenivasan	
M A R	18	20	Oru Madapravinte Katha	Prem Nazir, Mammootty	Alleppey Ashraf		G. Devarajan	
M A R	18	21	Oru Swakaryam	Venu Nagavally, Jalaja	Harikumar		M. B. Sreenivasan	
M A R	18	22	Eettillam	Nedumudi Venu, Mammootty	Fazil		A. T. Ummer	
M A R	18	23	Mouna Raagam	Sukumari, Shankar	Ambili		K. J. Yesudas	
M A R	24	24	Chakravalam Chuvannappol	Prem Nazir, Mammootty, Mohanlal	J. Sasikumar		M. K. Arjunan	
M A R	25	25	Surumaitta Kannukal	Vijayaraghavan, Bahadoor	S. Konnannatt		K. Raghavan	
M A R	25	26	Mansoru Maha Samudram	Mammootty, Ratheesh	P. K. Joseph		M. K. Arjunan	
M A R	25	27	Thaavalam	Jayabharathi, Mohanlal	Thampi Kannanthanam		Johnson	
A P R	1	28	Kadamba	Prakash, Jayanthi	P. N. Menon	Bichu Thirumala, Thikkodiyan	K. Raghavan	
A P R	8	29	Karyam Nissaram	Prem Nazir, Lakshmi	Balachandra Menon		Kannur Rajan	
A P R	23	30	Aa Raathri	Mammootty, Poornima Jayaram	Joshiy		Ilaiyaraaja	
A P R	23	31	Angam	Prem Nazir, Madhu	Joshiy		Shankar–Ganesh	
A P R	25	32	Thimingalam	Shankar, Balan K. Nair	Crossbelt Mani		G. Devarajan	
A P R	25	33	Belt Mathai	Sukumaran, Ratheesh	T. S. Mohan		Raveendran	
A P R	29	34	America America	Mammootty, Ratheesh	I. V. Sasi	Bichu Thirumala	Shyam	
A P R	29	35	Visa	Mammootty, Mohanlal, Sreenath	Balu Kiriyath	Bichu Thirumala	Jithin Shyam	
A P R	30	36	Aadhipathyam	Prem Nazir, Madhu	Sreekumaran Thampi		Shyam	
M A Y	6	37	Kathi	Venu Nagavally, Menaka	V. P. Mohammed		M. B. Sreenivasan	
M A Y	6	38	Ente Katha	Prem Nazir, Reena	P. K. Joseph		A. T. Ummer	
M A Y	6	39	Oru Mukham Pala Mukham	Ratheesh, Srividya	P. K. Joseph		A. T. Ummer	
M A Y	6	40	Rathilayam	Captain Raju, Silk Smitha	P. Chandrakumar		A. T. Ummer	
M A Y	11	41	Coolie	Ratheesh, Mammootty	Ashok Kumar		Raveendran	
M A Y	13	42	Aashrayam	Prem Nazir, Seema	K. Ramachandran		M. B. Sreenivasan	
M A Y	13	43	Swapname Ninakku Nandi	Jayabharathi, Sukumaran	Kallayam Krishnadas		G. Devarajan	
M A Y	20	44	Anantham Ajnatham		K. P. Jayan		M. K. Arjunan	
J U N	3	45	Prathijnja	Prem Nazir, Mammootty	P. N. Sundaram		Ben Surendar	
J U N	7	46	Ahangaaram	M. G. Soman, Rajalakshmi	D. Sasi	Bichu Thirumala	Maharaja	
J U N	24	47	Ee Vazhi Mathram	Shankar, Sukumaran	Ravi Gupthan		Shyam	
J U N	24	48	Pinnilavu	Madhu, Mammootty	P. G. Viswambharan		Ilaiyaraaja	
J U L	8	49	Aaroodam	Nedumudi Venu, Seema	I. V. Sasi		Shyam	
J U L	8	50	Kinnaram	Nedumudi Venu, Sukumaran	Sathyan Anthikkad		Raveendran	
J U L	8	51	Arabikkadal	Madhu, Ratheesh, Mohanlal	J. Sasikumar		M. K. Arjunan	
J U L	9	52	Varanmaare Aavashyamundu	Sukumari, Pattom Sadan	Hariharan		K. J. Joy	
J U L	22	53	Kaattaruvi	Mammootty, Sukumaran	J. Sasikumar		G. Devarajan	
J U L	28	55	Nathi Muthal Nathi Vare	Mammootty, Ratheesh	Vijayanand		Raghu Kumar	
J U L	29	56	Samrambham	Madhu, Sunanda	Baby		K. J. Joy	
A U G	12	57	Mortuary	Prem Nazir, Shankar Panikkar	Baby		K. J. Joy	
A U G	12	58	Eettappuli	Shankar, Ambika	Crossbelt Mani		G. Devarajan	
A U G	19	59	Mahabali	Prem Nazir, Jayabharathi	J. Sasikumar		M. K. Arjunan	
A U G	19	60	Kodungattu	Prem Nazir, Madhu	Joshiy		K. J. Joy	
A U G	19	61	Mandanmmar Londanil	Jagathy Sreekumar, Nedumudi Venu	Sathyan Anthikkad		Shyam	
A U G	19	62	Oomakkuyil	Jagathy Sreekumar, Adoor Bhasi	Balu Mahendra		Ilaiyaraaja	
A U G	20	63	Iniyengilum	Mohanlal, Ratheesh	I. V. Sasi		Shyam	
A U G	20	64	Swapnalokum	Shanthi Krishna, Sreenath	John Peters		Jerry Amaldev	
S E P	9	65	Sandhya Mayangum Neram	Bharath Gopi, Jayabharathy	Bharathan		Shyam	
S E P	9	66	Asthi	Bharath Gopi, Ambika	Ravi		G. Devarajan	
S E P	9	67	Paalam	Madhu, Ratheesh	M. Krishnan Nair		A. T. Ummer	
S E P	16	68	Oomana Thinkal	Kaviyoor Ponnamma, Venu Nagavally	Yatheendra Das	Bichu Thirumala	M. B. Sreenivasan	
S E P	16	69	Yudham	Prem Nazir, Madhu, Ratheesh	J. Sasikumar		Shankar–Ganesh	
S E P	23	70	Sandhya Vandanam	Lakshmi, Sukumaran	J. Sasikumar		L. P. R. Varma	
S E P	23	71	Kingini Kombu	Jagathy Sreekumar, Nedumudi Venu	Jayan Adiyattu		Raveendran	
O C T	7	72	Kaathirunna Divasam	Mammootty, Nedumudi Venu	P. K. Joseph		P. S. Divakar	
O C T	7	73	Saagaram Santham	Mammootty, Nedumudi Venu	P. G. Vishwambharan		M. B. Sreenivasan	
O C T	7	74	Marakkillorikkalum	Prem Nazir, Shankar	Fazil	Bichu Thirumala, Jamal Kochangadi	Zero Babu	
O C T	7	75	Ente Mamattukkuttiyammakku	Bharath Gopi, Mohanlal	Fazil	Bichu Thirumala	Jerry Amaldev	
O C T	14	76	Vaashi	Nedumudi Venu, Mancheri Chandran	M. R. Joseph		Raveendran	
O C T	14	77	Engane Nee Marakkum	Mohanlal, Shankar	M. Mani		Shyam	
O C T	14	78	Ashtapadi	Menaka, Devan	Ambili		Vidyadharan	
O C T	21	79	Naanayam	Madhu, Srividya	I. V. Sasi		Shyam	
O C T	21	80	Koodevide	Suhasini, Mammootty	P. Padmarajan		Johnson	
O C T	21	81	Deepaaradhana	Prem Nazir, M. G. Soman	Vijayanand		A. T. Ummer	
O C T	28	82	Parasparam	Venu Nagavally, Zarina Wahab	Shajiyem		M. B. Sreenivasan	
O C T	28	83	Onnu Chirikku	Mammootty, Swapna	P. G. Viswambharan		Johnson	
N O V	4	84	Kaikeyi	Srividya, Prathap Pothen	I. V. Sasi		M. S. Viswanathan	
N O V	4	85	Ee Yugam	Prem Nazir, Srividya	N. P. Suresh		A. T. Ummer	
N O V	9	86	Asthram	Mammootty, Mohanlal	P. N. Menon		Shyam	
N O V	11	87	Aattakalasam	Prem Nazir, Mohanlal	J. Sasikumar		Raveendran	
N O V	11	88	Maniyara	Mammootty, Seema	M. Krishnan Nair		A. T. Ummer	
N O V	12	89	Kolakkomaban	Mohanlal, Manavalan Joseph	J. Sasikumar		Johnson	
N O V	12	90	Lekhayude Maranam Oru Flashback	Bharath Gopi, Mammootty	K. G. George		M. B. Sreenivasan	
N O V	25	91	Prem Nazirine Kanmanilla	Prem Nazir, Shankar Pannikar	Lenin Rajendran		M. B. Srinivasan	
N O V	28	92	Rugma	Mammootty, Seema	P. G. Viswambharan		M. B. Sreenivasan	
D E C	2	93	Eenam	Venu Nagavally, Shanthi Krishna	Bharathan		Bharathan	
D E C	2	94	Aana	Madhu, Srividya	P. Chandrakumar		Jerry Amaldev	
D E C	2	95	Nizhal Moodiya Nirangal	Sharada, Ratheesh	Jeassy		K. J. Joy	
D E C	9	96	Manju	Sangeeta Naik, Nanditha Bose	M. T. Vasudevan Nair		M. B. Sreenivasan	
D E C	9	97	Prasnam Gurutharam	Balachandramenon, Poornima Bhagyaraj	Balachandramenon	Bichu Thirumala	Ravindran	
D E C	16	98	Ponnethooval	Ratheesh, Madhavi	J. Williams		Raghu Kumar	
D E C	23	99	Kattathe Kilikkoodu	Bharath Gopi, Mohanlal	Bharathan		Johnson	
D E C	25	100	Changatham	Mammootty, Madhavi	Bhadran		Raveendran	
D E C	31	101	Nokkukuthi	Ajitha Gopalakrishnan, K. V. Haridas	Mankada Ravi Varma			
			Bandham	Prem Nazir, Madhu, Lakshmi	Vijay Anand	Bichu Thirumala	Shyam	
			Passport					
			Sesham Kazhchayil					
			Aadyathe Anuraagam					
			Asuran					
			Naadam					
			Purappadu					

== Dubbed films ==
Film	Direction	Story	Screenplay	Main actors
Sagara Sangamam	K. Vishwanath			
Raaga Deepam	S. Rajan			
Muradan	Sidha Linkayya			
Thee Jwaala	Rajendra Singh			
Snehabandanam	K. Vijayan			
Professor Janaki	R. C. Sakti			
Penninte Prathikaaram	K. S. Reddy			
Garuda Rekha	P. S. Prakash			
Lourde Mathavu		K. Thankappan	G. Devarajan	
