= Sathyam (1980 film) =

- Directed by: M. Krishnan Nair
- Screenplay by: Dr. Balakrishnan
- Produced by: Amarnag Productions
- Starring: Sreenath; Sathaar; Premji; Cochin Haneefa
- Cinematography: Dutt (SICA)
- Edited by: V.P. Krishnan
- Music by: A. T. Ummer
- Release date: 12 December 1980
- Country: India
- Language: Malayalam

Sathyam (transl. Truth) is a 1980 Indian Malayalam film, directed by M. Krishnan Nair. The film stars Sreenath, Sathaar, Premji and Cochin Haneefa in the lead roles. The film has musical score by A. T. Ummer.

== Cast ==
- Sreenath
- Sathaar
- Premji
- Cochin Haneefa
- Shanthi Krishna
- Kuthiravattom Pappu
- Renu Chandra

== Soundtrack ==
The music was composed by A. T. Ummer and the lyrics were written by Bichu Thirumala.

No.	Song	Singers	Lyrics	Length (m:ss)
1	"Raajavu Naadu Neengi"	Vani Jairam	Bichu Thirumala	
2	"Ramzan Chandrika"	K. J. Yesudas	Bichu Thirumala	
3	"Swapnam Kandu Njan"	K. J. Yesudas, S. Janaki	Bichu Thirumala	
4	"Vaachalamaaya Nimishangal"	K. J. Yesudas	Bichu Thirumala	
