= Yathra =

- Theatrical release poster
- Directed by: Balu Mahendra
- Screenplay by: Balu Mahendra
- Story by: John Paul
- Based on: The Yellow Handkerchief
- Produced by: Joseph Abraham
- Starring: Mammootty; Shobana
- Cinematography: Balu Mahendra
- Edited by: D. Vasu
- Music by: Ilaiyaraaja
- Production company: Prakkattu Films
- Release date: 20 September 1985
- Country: India
- Language: Malayalam
- Box office: ₹19 million

Yathra (transl. The Journey) is a 1985 Indian Malayalam-language romantic drama film written and directed by Balu Mahendra. The film stars Mammootty and Shobana, while Adoor Bhasi, Thilakan and Alummoodan play supporting roles. The film tells a fictional story but is built upon the human rights violations by the police and the prison authorities in India during the emergency of 1975–1977, when the fundamental rights of the citizens were suspended. It is an adaptation of the 1977 Japanese classic The Yellow Handkerchief.

The film was produced by Joseph Abraham under the banner Prakkattu Films. The film was his third production venture, the others being Olangal and Oomakkuyil. The film features original songs composed by Ilaiyaraaja, with lyrics written by P. Bhaskaran and O. N. V. Kurup. The cinematography of the film was done by Balu Mahendra himself, while the editing was done by D. Vasu.

Yathra was released on 20 September 1985 and received critical acclaim. It was a box office success and had a theatrical run of over a year. The film won three Kerala State Film Awards: Best Film with Popular Appeal and Aesthetic Value, Best Director for Balu Mahendra and the Special Jury Award for Mammootty. Shobana was nominated for Best Actress category at the Filmfare Awards South. Thilakan also won the Kerala Film Critics Association Award for Second Best Actor. The film was remade by Balu Mahendra in Telugu as Nireekshana (1986) and in Tamil as Adhu Oru Kana Kaalam (2005).

== Plot ==
The story unfolds as Unnikrishnan, a convict, now free from jail, tells his tragic love story to his fellow passengers in a school bus. An orphan and a forest officer by profession, he falls in love with a local woman, Thulasi, during his stay at a forest area. They decided to get married, and he sets off to tell his best friend about his plans. On his way back, the police arrest him as a suspected criminal, who looks similar to Unnikrishnan. There he accidentally kills a policeman and gets life imprisonment. During his early days at jail, he writes a letter to Thulasi asking her to forget him. When his prison term was about to complete, he writes a letter to see if she waits for him. After long years of torment in the jail he goes to meet Thulasi. Does she still wait for him? That's the question of his fellow passengers, too. At the end, she does wait for him, and welcomes him with lamps, and a face, wet with tears of joy, and sadness, together. Thus, the film ends off happily, with everyone shedding tears of joy.

== Cast ==
- Mammootty as Unnikrishnan
- Shobana as Thulasi
- Adoor Bhasi as Priest
- Thilakan as Jailer
- Nahas
- Sunny
- Achankunju as Joseph
- Kunchan as Devasiya
- Azeez as SI K.G Nair
- Alummoodan as Paramu Nair
- K. P. A. C. Sunny as District Forest Officer
- T. R. Omana
- Anju as Girl in the bus
- Manohar
- P. R. Menon
- Baby Preethi
- K. R. Savithri
- Mounika
- Master Vimala

== Reception ==
The film was released on 20 September 1985. According to a trade analysis by Sreedhar Pillai for India Today, the film grossed around 0.19 crores from the releasing centers, becoming the highest grossing Malayalam film of the year. Yathra completed a 120-day run in theatres. Shobha Warrier of Rediff while reviewing Athu Oru Kana Kaalam (2005) wrote, "Those who have not seen the original may find the film poignant and interesting but as a person who has seen the original with two great artistes at their best, I found the film extremely disappointing." Further writing, "There is absolutely no comparison between Mammootty and Dhanush, or Shobhana and Priya Mani. To be fair to the young heroine, Priya Mani looks innocent and vulnerable but when you have seen the same role performed with more finesse and maturity, you cannot help but feel disappointed."

== Accolades ==
Award	Category	Nominee(s)	Result	Ref.
Kerala State Film Awards	Best Film with Popular Appeal and Aesthetic Value	Balu Mahendra, Joseph Abraham	Won	
Kerala State Film Awards	Best Director	Balu Mahendra	Won	
Kerala State Film Awards	Special Jury Award	Mammootty	Won	
Filmfare Awards South	Best Actress	Shobana	Nominated	

== Soundtrack ==
The music was composed by Ilaiyaraaja. The song "Thanannam Thannanam" is inspired by My Favorite Things from the 1959 Rodgers and Hammerstein musical The Sound of Music.

Song	Singers	Lyrics	Length
"Kunnathoru Kaavundu" (resung song from Asuravithu)	Cochin Alex	P. Bhaskaran	
"Thannannam Thaanannam"	K. J. Yesudas, Ambili, Chorus, Antony, Anna Sangeetha	O. N. V. Kurup	
"Yamune Ninnude"	S. Janaki, Chorus	O. N. V. Kurup	
