= Adhu Oru Kana Kaalam =

2005 film by Balu Mahendra

- Poster
- Directed by: Balu Mahendra
- Written by: Balu Mahendra
- Produced by: K. A. Sai Chidambaram
- Starring: Dhanush; Priyamani
- Cinematography: Balu Mahendra
- Edited by: Balu Mahendra
- Music by: Ilaiyaraaja
- Production company: Vishwa Films
- Release date: 2 November 2005
- Country: India
- Language: Tamil

Adhu Oru Kana Kaalam (transl. That was a period of dream) (Note: Spelt on the CBFC certificate and title card as Adhu Oru Kana Kkaalam.) is a 2005 Indian Tamil-language romantic crime drama film written and directed by Balu Mahendra. The film stars Dhanush and Priyamani, while Karunas and Delhi Ganesh played supporting roles. The music was composed by Ilaiyaraaja, while Sai Suresh produced the venture. The film is a remake of the director's own Malayalam film Yathra. It was released on 2 November 2005, coinciding with Diwali, and received a below average response commercially.

== Plot ==
Srinivasan, a convict, escapes from prison and hitches a ride on a truck to meet his love interest Thulasi. He reveals his flashback to the truck driver, telling him of the disputes between his ambitious father and himself. When the parents leave home for a week, Srinivasan is left in the maid's care. Soon, he meets the maid's daughter, Thulasi, his childhood playmate, and they fall in love. But his father objects to his son falling in love with Thulasi.

One day, Srinivasan and his friends land up in prison for crashing their car on a police vehicle. While at the police station, Srinivasan locks horns with an inmate in jail and when he pushes him in a fit of rage, he sustains a serious head injury subsequently killing him. Eventually Srinivasan gets convicted for 10-year-rigorous imprisonment. His mother dies, Thulasi's family goes bankrupt and leaves to their native village in Ooty. A dejected Srinivasan escapes from prison to meet Thulasi. Whether the two join forms the rest of the story.

== Cast ==
- Dhanush as Srinivasan
- Priyamani as Thulasi (Voice dubbed by Prameela)
- Delhi Ganesh as Ganesh
- Kalairani as Sathya
- Karunas
- Thalaivasal Vijay
- Shanmugarajan
- Amarasigamani as Inspector
- Munnar Ramesh
- Usha Ravichandran
- Jashik
- Kovai Babu
- Rail Ravi
- Srimurugan
- Tejashree in a special appearance

== Production ==
Following the success of Kaadhal Kondein (2003) starring Dhanush, Balu Mahendra signed on the actor to appear in his next film in July 2003. Initially the director revealed that the film titled Adhu Oru Kana Kaalam would be an extension to his 1979 film Azhiyatha Kolangal stating that Dhanush would play a teenager infatuated by a woman who is fifteen years older than him to be played by Ramya Krishnan. However he opted against doing that story and decided to build his film around his 1985 film Yathra, and the title of the film was subsequently changed to Unakkae Uyiranaen. It was later changed back to the original title before release.

Production began in December 2003 with scenes featuring the lead pair shot in Chennai. As of November 2004, filming was still not complete, with Dhanush, who had recently married Aishwarya Rajinikanth, delaying his honeymoon, to commit to a fifteen-day schedule in December 2004. During the making of the film, Dhanush also struck up a friendship with assistant director Vetrimaaran, and the pair have since come together for multiple films. The film was delayed through late 2004 after the director fell ill.

The film faced criticism for an early promotional hoarding put up in Chennai which featured photographs of Priyamani and Dhanush in a compromising position, and was removed by police. Further trouble occurred in October 2005, when Mahendra approached the police seeking action to secure a sum of ₹3.75 lakh (equivalent to ₹14 lakh or US$15,000 in 2026), an outstanding amount of his salary for directing the film, from the producer and matters were resolved quickly. Post release, members of the regional censor board complained that the promos of Adhu Oru Kana Kaalam were being shown on television without mentioning that the film had an "A" (adults only) certificate. At the time of censoring, Mahendra was not willing to cut the deep lip-to-lip kissing scenes between the lead pair of Dhanush and Priyamani and opted for an A certificate, which he subsequently refused to note down in the promotions.

== Soundtrack ==
The soundtrack was composed by Ilaiyaraaja.

Song	Singer(s)	Lyrics
"Antha Naal"	Shreya Ghoshal, Vijay Yesudas	Vaali
"Ennada Ninaichae"	Ranjith, Vijay Yesudas	Muthulingam
"Kaatu Vazhi"	Ilaiyaraaja	Ilaiyaraaja
"Killi Thattu"	Bhavatharini, Jothi	Mu. Metha
"Unnale Thookam"	Malathi, Ranjith	Na. Muthukumar

== Release and reception ==
Sify wrote, "A fragile looking Dhanush looks bewildered and lost throughout while Priya Mani has tried her best to do justice to her character [...] The songs tuned by Ilayaraja falls flat. All in all, a disappointing venture from a prominent member of the earlier off-beat brigade of film makers". Shobha Warrier of Rediff.com stated that the film "disappointed", criticising the film in comparison to Mahendra's earlier work, Yathra. SRA of The Hindu noted that "excelling in technical aspects, the film falls short in the area of storyline." Lajjavathi of Kalki praised Dhanush's acting and added that the moderate storyline and melodious music can both please the fans with quality taste like peacock feathers. K. N. Vijiyan of New Straits Times gave the film a favourable review.

Adhu Oru Kana Kaalam opened alongside other big films like Vijay-starrer Sivakasi and the Vikram-starrer Majaa. The film was described by trade pundits as a "complete wash-out".
