= Anju (actress) =

Indian actress

- Born: Tamil Nadu, India
- Other name: Baby Anju
- Occupation: Actress
- Years active: 1979–present
- Spouse: Tiger Prabhakar (m. 1996; sep. 1997)
- Children: 1

Anju is an Indian actress best known for her work in Malayalam and Tamil films and television series.

== Personal life ==
Anju belongs to a Tamil family and was raised in Chennai. Her father Raja is a TurkishMuslim while her mother Ratna was a Hindu brahmin.

At the age of 17, Anju married actor Tiger Prabhakar, who was 48 years old. They got separated within a year. She has a son, Arjun, from this marriage.

== Career ==
Anju debuted at the age of two with the Tamil movie Uthiripookkal in 1979. She had acted in a Kannada and Telugu movies as well. She won the Kerala State Film Award for Best Actress in 1988 for the movie Rukmini. The film sometimes spelled Rugmini was directed by K. P. Kumaran. She became known as Baby Anju because of her early roles as Child artist.

== Awards ==
- 1988 Kerala State Film Award for Best Actress - Rukmini

== Filmography ==
=== Malayalam ===
Year	Title	Role	Notes
1981	Garjanam	Asha	
1982	Ormakkayi	Chakki	
1982	Gaanam		
1982	Aa Raathri	Minikutty	
1982	Kaattile Paattu	Young Priya	
1982	Olangal	Young Priya	
1983	Oomana Thinkal	Indumol	
1983	Paalam	Bindhu	
1983	Aana	Ayisha	
1983	Saagaram Santham	Young Sreedevi	
1983	Aashrayam	Minimol Thomas	
1983	Kattathe Kilikkoodu	Indu	
1984	Parannu Parannu Parannu	Jessy / Sreekutty	
1984	Kodathy	Minimol	
1984	Rakshassu	Shalini	
1985	Yathra	Girl in the bus	
1985	Dheivatheyorthu	Young Nani	
1985	Ozhivukalam	Girl performing Sarpam Thullal	
1985	Janakeeya Kodathi	Gopi's daughter	
1986	Abhayam Thedi	Aashakutty	
1987	Vamban	Kala's daughter	
1989	Rugmini	Rugmini	
1990	Kattukuthira	Charulatha	
1990	Thazhvaram	Raji	
1990	Commander	Lakshmi	
1991	Neelagiri	Usha	
1992	Kizhakkan Pathrose	Kunjumol	
1992	Kauravar	Suja	
1992	Oottyppattanam	Sethulakshmi	
1992	Pandu Pandoru Rajakumari	Devu	
1992	Ezhara Ponnana	Renu	
1993	Thalamura	Sreelakshmi	
1994	Varaphalam	Geetha	
1994	Cabinet	Nandana	
1994	Minnaram	Teena	
1994	Kadal	Fousi	
1995	Kakkakum Poochakkum Kalyanam	Bhagyalakshmi	
1995	Street	Anitha	
1995	Arabikadaloram	Clara	
1995	Hijack	Gayathri	
1996	Swantham Makalkku Snehapoorvam	-	
1997	Ranger	Remya	
1997	Poomarathanalil	Indu	
1998	Amma Ammaayiyamma	Sulochana	
1999	Indulekha	Gayathri Menon	
2001	Nimishangal	Eleena	
2001	Nariman	Ammini	
2001	Ee Raavil		
2001	Jwalanam	Maggie	
2003	Janakeeyam	Usha	
2004	Nirappakittu	Vasundhara	
2005	Izhra	Thevar's wife	

=== Tamil ===
Year	Title	Role	Notes
1979	Uthiripookkal	Bhavani	Child artist
1980	Poottaatha Poottukkal		Child artist
1980	Polladhavan	Manohar's daughter	Child artist
1980	Ullasa Paravaigal	Young Nirmala	Child artist
1981	Chinna Mul Peria Mul	Dolly	Child artist
1981	Meendum Kokila	Subramaniam and Kokila's daughter	Child artist
1981	Garjanai	Asha	Child artist
1981	Bala Nagamma	Young Bala Nagamma	Child artist
1982	Hitler Umanath		Child artist
1982	Darling, Darling, Darling	Young Radha	Child artist
1982	Poi Satchi		Child artist
1982	Vadivangal	Vini	Child artist
1982	Azhagiya Kanne	Kasthoori	Child artist
1982	Boom Boom Madu		Child artist
1983	Villiyanur Matha	Lalitha	Child artist
1984	Nee Thodum Pothu		Child artist
1984	Anbulla Malare		Child artist
1985	En Selvame		Child artist
1985	Oonjaladum Uravugal		Child artist
1986	Aayiram Pookkal Malarattum		Child artist
1989	Mundhanai Sabatham	Sinthamani	Leading Role
1990	Keladi Kanmani	Anu	
1990	Engal Swamy Ayyappan	Lakshmi	
1990	Arangetra Velai	Sundhari	
1990	Seetha Geetha	Geetha	
1990	Reengaram		
1991	Adhikari	Anu	
1991	Naan Pogum Paadhai	Lakshmi	
1991	En Pottukku Sonthakkaran	Pallavi	
1992	Agni Paarvai	Shanthi	
1992	Abhirami	Rajeshwari	
1993	Aadhityan	Deivanai	
1993	Prathap	Priya	
1993	Purusha Lakshanam	Anju	
1993	Kattalai	Anju	
1995	Ilavarasi	Ilavarasi	
1996	Gopala Gopala	Fathima	
1999	Endrendrum Kadhal	Krishna's wife	
1999	Poomagal Oorvalam	Saravanan's mother	
1999	Unakkaga Ellam Unakkaga	Savithri	
2000	Kuberan	Thangam	
2000	James Pandu		
2003	Pop Corn	Valli	
2003	Unnai Charanadaindhen	Teja's mother	
2003	Military	Velu Nayakar's wife	
2007	Veerappu	Kodi	
2007	Polladhavan	Selvam's wife	
2009	Indira Vizha	Indira	
2010	Neeyum Naanum	Sunitha	
2011	Minsaram	Minister	
2013	Madha Yaanai Koottam	Deepa	

=== Telugu ===
Year	Title	Role	Notes
1981	Bala Nagamma	Young Bala Nagamma	
1981	Agni Poolu		
1984	Kode Trachu	Babu	
1986	Nireekshana	Girl in bus	
1990	Udhyamam	-	
1993	Jeevithame Oka Cinema	Ganga	
2002	Seshu	Padma	

=== Kannada ===
Year	Title	Role	Notes
1981	Garjane	Asha	
1996	Ranger	-	
1998	King	Sundari	
1998	My Dear Tiger	—N/a	Producer
2001	Prema Rajya	Soni	

== Television ==
All shows are TV series unless noted

Year	Title	Channel	Role	Language
1998	Ladies Hostel	DD Malayalam		Malayalam
1999	Payyan Kathakal	DD Malayalam		Malayalam
1999–2001	Chithi	Sun TV	Vaideghi	Tamil
2000–2001	Krishnadasi	Sun TV	Lecturer Kalyani	Tamil
2001	Soolam	Sun TV		Tamil
2002–2003	Agal Vilakkugal	Sun TV		Tamil
2002–2003	Janani	Sun TV		Tamil
2002–2003	Gayathri	Gemini TV	Priya	Telugu
2004	Manasi	DD Malayalam		Malayalam
2004	Kadamattathu Kathanar	Asianet	Ettukettil Bhanumathi	Malayalam
2005–2006	Selvi	Sun TV	Shenbagavalli Pandian	Tamil
2007–2008	Arasi	Sun TV	Shenbagavalli Pandian	Tamil
2007–2008	Akka Thangai	Kalaignar TV		Tamil
2008	Kalasam	Sun TV	Ranjini	Tamil
2007	Swami Ayyappan	Asianet		Malayalam
2009	Devi Mahatmyam	Asianet	Pankajakshi	Malayalam
2016–2018	Sathyam Sivam Sundaram	Amrita TV	Bhairavi	Malayalam
2020–2021	Magarasi	Sun TV	Chamundeshwari	Tamil
2020–2021	Eeramana Rojave	Star Vijay	Anjugam	Tamil
2020	Vanakkam Tamizha ( TV show)	Sun TV	Herself	Tamil
2021	Idhayathai Thirudathey	Colors Tamil	Special Appearance	Tamil
2021–2022	Geethanjali	Raj TV	Chandra	Tamil
2022–2023	Vidhya No.1	Zee Tamil	Sundhari	Tamil
2022	Red Carpet (TV show)	Amrita TV	Herself	Malayalam
2023–2024	Amme Bhagavathy	Flowers TV	Mangalathamma	Malayalam
2023–Present	Singapennae	Sun TV	Lalitha	Tamil
2024–2026	Gowri	Kalaignar TV	Akila	Tamil
2024–2025	Constable Manju	Surya TV	Bhanumati	Malayalam
2026–Present	Sandhya Raagam	Zee Tamil	Sivaranjini	Tamil
