= Achankunju =

Indian film actor

- Born: 1930; Kacherikadavu, Kottayam, Travancore
- Died: 16 January 1987 (aged 56); Kottayam
- Occupation: Actor
- Years active: 1980–1987
- Spouse: Achamma
- Children: 2
- Awards: Kerala State Film Award for Best Actor; Kerala State Film Critics Award

Achankunju (1930 – 16 January 1987) was an Indian actor who worked in Malayalam cinema. He started his career in the 1980s, mainly portraying villainous roles. He acted in more than 50 films in Malayalam.

== Early life ==
Achankunju hails from the Nellissery family, Kacherikkadavu, Kottayam in Kerala. He is a Kerala State Film Award-winning actor in 1981 for the movie Lorry.

== Death ==
He died on 16 January 1987 at the age of 56 at Kottayam. He was survived by his wife Achamma, a son, Shajan and a daughter, Esamma.

== Awards ==
- 1980 Kerala State Film Awards: Best Actor for Lorry
- 1980 Kerala State Film Critics Award for Lorry

== Filmography ==
Year	Title	Role	Notes
1980	Lorry	Velan	
1981	Greeshma Jwala	Kattumooppan	
1981	Parankimala	Pillai Chettan	
1981	Chaatta	Kariya	
1981	Kaattu Kallan	Sundaram	
1981	Choothaattam		
1981	Inaye Thedi		
1981	Ahimsa		
1982	Ee Nadu	Porinju	
1982	Kakka		
1982	Padayottam		
1983	Himavaahini	Panthalam Kurup	
1983	Nizhal Moodiya Nirangal		
1983	Prem Nazirine Kanmanilla	Maran	
1983	Sandhya Mayangum Neram		
1983	Aattakalasam	Kumaran	
1983	Naseema	Mammad	
1983	Kadamba	Velu	
1983	Enikku Vishakunnu	Mathai	
1983	Saagaram Santham		
1983	Sandhya Vandanam	Bhaskaran Aasan	
1983	Naadam		
1985	Yathra	Joseph	
1985	Thinkalaazhcha Nalla Divasam	Kunju	
1985	Kaanathaya Penkutty		
1985	Angadikkappurathu	Saithakka	
1985	Thozhil Allengil Jail		
1986	Nimishangal		
1986	Ilanjippookkal		
1986	Niramulla Ravulkal	Sreedran Pilla	
1986	Ambili Ammavan		
1986	Meenamasathile Sooryan	Police officer	
1986	Ithile Iniyum Varu	Govindankutty Ashan	
1986	Arappatta Kettiya Gramathil	Narayanan	
