= Ente Katha (film) =

Ente Kadha
- Directed by: P. K. Joseph
- Written by: Jessy Rexena; Dr. Pavithran (dialogues)
- Screenplay by: Dr. Pavithran
- Produced by: P. K. Joseph
- Starring: Prem Nazir; Sukumari; Mammootty; Mohanlal
- Cinematography: Rajkumar
- Edited by: K. Sankunni
- Music by: A. T. Ummer
- Production company: Sandhya Movie Makers
- Distributed by: Sandhya Movie Makers
- Release date: 6 May 1983
- Country: India
- Language: Malayalam

Ente Kadha (transl. My story) is a 1983 Indian Malayalam-language film directed and produced by P. K. Joseph. The film stars Prem Nazir, Sukumari, Mammootty and Mohanlal in the lead roles. The film has musical score by A. T. Ummer.

== Cast ==
- Prem Nazir as Sreekumar and Shankar
- Sukumari as Babu's mother
- Mammootty as Babu
- Mohanlal as Ramesh
- Reena as Usha
- Adoor Bhasi as head constable
- Ratheesh as Rajesh
- Prathapachandran
- Unnimary as Aparna
- Meena
- Vincent as Rich man in bar

== Soundtrack ==
The music was composed by A. T. Ummer and the lyrics were written by Poovachal Khader and Dr. Pavithran.

| No. | Song | Singers | Lyrics | Length (m:ss) |
|---|---|---|---|---|
| 1 | "Allallalla Killikkilli" | S. Janaki | Poovachal Khader | |
| 2 | "Indukalaadharan" | K. J. Yesudas | Poovachal Khader | |
| 3 | "Prapancha Veena" | K. J. Yesudas | Dr. Pavithran | |
| 4 | "Vaachala Bimbangale" | K. J. Yesudas, Sujatha Mohan | Poovachal Khader | |
