= Parankimala =

- Directed by: Bharathan
- Written by: Kakkanadan
- Screenplay by: Kakkanadan
- Produced by: M. O. Joseph
- Starring: Benny, Sukumari; Nedumudi Venu; Soorya; Achankunju; Bahadoor
- Cinematography: Vipin Das
- Edited by: N. P. Suresh
- Music by: G. Devarajan
- Production company: Manjilas
- Distributed by: Chalachitra
- Release date: 10 July 1981
- Country: India
- Language: Malayalam

Parankimala is a 1981 Indian Malayalam-language film based on the 1971 novel of the same name by Kakkanadan. Directed by Bharathan and produced by M. O. Joseph, the film stars Benny, Sukumari, Nedumudi Venu, Achankunju and Bahadoor. The film has musical score by G. Devarajan. The film is considered a classic in Malayalam cinema. It was remade in 2014 under the same name.

== Plot ==
Thangam and Appu are in love. But Appu's family opposes their marriage.

Thankam and Appu are childhood friends in love with each other. Appu owns a factory and Thankam's father Pilla Chettan is a labourer staying nearby. Naniyamma, another local married woman lusts after Appu, while Velu Annan/Kottuvadi, the local hooch seller, is having an affair with Naniyamma behind her husband Govinda Kaniyan's back. Appu's sister staying with them happens to see Thankam and Appu in compromising situations various times and warns Thankam not to try and woo him because of their class and caste difference. Meanwhile, Velu tries to seduce Thankam who sternly stops his advances. He gets close to Pilla Chettan by selling his arrack and gets his promise that he will marry off Thankam to him. However Appu and Thankam still love each other madly and refuse to let go of their relationships. Both families vehemently object to this affair and fight with each other to prevent this from happening. Appu's mother requests Thankam to spare his son and go away somewhere since she fears he will take his life if she also commits something the same.

Without any other way and to save Appu from spoiling his life, Thankam runs away one night with Velu after writing a letter to Appu. Both are heartbroken and Appu idles his time away thinking about her for quite some time. Appu's mother and sister plan and bring Sreedevi, his cousin to their house, hoping to make Appu fall for her and get them married off. Meanwhile, Thankam starts living with Velu in some other place where he starts selling arrack again. He subdues her finally and has his way with her, telling her that she belongs to him now. Sreedevi tries to woo Appu but finds him indifferent to her advances. Velu plans of starting his arrack business for Thrissur pooram with his trucker client Kunjipaalu who has an eye on Thankam. He tries various ways to warm up to her with Velu's knowledge. Thankam's pleas for help goes unheard when Velu shuts her down accusing about her relationship with Appu from young age and is hell bent on pimping her out for his personal gains. On the night when they are about to transfer hooch in Kunjipaalu's truck, he tries to get physical with Thankam and she kicks him out. In the ensuing scuffle with Velu, Thankam ends up killing him. She runs out towards her house and reaches there by next day morning. She finds Appu and both embrace each other. Their happiness is short lived as the police arrive and arrest Thankam for the murder of Velu.

== Cast ==
- Soorya as Thankam (Voice dubbed by KPAC Lalitha)
- Benny as Appu (Hero)
- Sukumari as Appu's Mother
- Nedumudi Venu as Velu Annan/Kottuvadi
- Achankunju as Pillai Chettan, Thankam's Father
- Kuttiyedathi Vilasini as Thankam's mother
- Bahadoor as Govinda Kaniyan, Naniyamma's husband
- Kundara Johny as Chandran, Appu's brother-in-law
- Ranipadmini as Sreedevi
- T. G. Ravi as Kunjippalu, Lorry driver
- Lalithasree as Naniyamma
- Master Kishore Kumar as Thankam's brother

== Soundtrack ==
The music was composed by G. Devarajan with lyrics by P. Bhaskaran.

No.	Song	Singers	Lyrics	Length (m:ss)
1	"Elam Elam"	P. Madhuri, Srikanth	P. Bhaskaran	
2	"Jalaleela Jalaleela"	K. J. Yesudas, P. Madhuri	P. Bhaskaran	
