= Karpagam Vanthachu =

- VCD cover
- Directed by: R. Krishnamoorthy
- Screenplay by: R. Krishnamurthy
- Story by: Komal Swaminathan
- Produced by: S. Shyamala
- Starring: Arjun; Radhika
- Cinematography: R. H. Ashok
- Edited by: V. Chakrapani
- Music by: Shankar–Ganesh
- Production company: Shyamalaya Productions
- Release date: 15 October 1993
- Running time: 135 minutes
- Country: India
- Language: Tamil

Karpagam Vanthachu (transl. Karpagam has arrived) is a 1993 Indian Tamil-language comedy film directed by R. Krishnamoorthy. The film stars Arjun and Radhika, with Gowtham Sundararajan, Y. G. Mahendran, Vidyasri, Soorya, S. S. Chandran, Vinu Chakravarthy, Vennira Aadai Moorthy, and Charle playing supporting roles. It was released on 15 October 1993. The film is an adaptation of the stage play Delhi Maamiyar written by Komal Swaminathan. It was dubbed into Telugu as Bejawada Rowdy.

== Plot ==
Sakthivel is a poor orphan living alone in a slum and works as a cycle rickshaw puller. Being a short-tempered person, he cannot tolerate injustice so he is often caught in fights. He then meets the outspoken Karpagam, who delivers meals at homes. They fall in love with each other.

Raja and Sarathi are brothers, and they have lost their parents at a young age. Sarathi is married to the arrogant Sarasu and is totally submissive to her, while his younger brother Raja is a bachelor. Sarasu is the daughter of the wealthy man Pasupathi.

Later, Raja and his collegemate Radha fall in love with each other. Radha is cocky and proud in nature. She is from a poor family: her father Thiruchitrambalam and her brother Madhavan spend their time by playing cards. Sarathi accepts for the marriage, but he asks Radha to act as a soft-spoken and modest woman in front of Sarasu. Sarasu accepts too for their wedding. Raja and Radha finally get married.

After the marriage, Sarasu reveals her true colours. Sarasu and Radha then start to quarrel for simple matters, and it leads to an ego clash between the two women. Raja also becomes a submissive husband like his brother. One day, their uncle Mayilsamy comes from Delhi to live with them. Mayilsamy thinks that the two uncontrollable women need a mother-in-law to calm them.

Mayilsamy hires Karpagam to act as his wife and he wants Karpagam to change the two women's behaviour. Afterwards, Karpagam turns Sarasu and Radha's lives into hell on earth. Sakthivel also enters their house to play as Karpagam's brother. What transpires next forms the rest of the story.

== Cast ==
- Arjun as Sakthivel
- Radhika as Karpagam
- Gowtham Sundararajan as Raja
- Y. G. Mahendran as Sarathi
- Vidyasri as Radha
- Soorya as Sarasu
- S. S. Chandran as Mayilsamy (Delhi chithappa)
- Vinu Chakravarthy as Pasupathi
- Vennira Aadai Moorthy as Thiruchitrambalam
- Charle as Madhavan
- Nanjil Nalini as Thangamma
- Kokila as Kokila
- Thalapathy Dinesh

== Soundtrack ==
The music was composed by Shankar–Ganesh, with lyrics written by Vaali, Muthulingam, Na. Kamarasan and Venkatesh.

Song	Singer(s)	Duration
"Naan Padicha Pallikoodam"	Malaysia Vasudevan	3:42
"Padanisa"	Suja	2:47
"Ponnu Ninaichal"	S. P. Balasubrahmanyam, Mano, Swarnalatha, Suja	4:14
"Karpagam Vanthachu"	Chorus	1:00
"Naan Than Di"	Swarnalatha	3:51
"Naalu Pakkum Peigal"	Mano	4:21
"Muruga Vel Muruga"	Mano, Swarnalatha	3:41

== Reception ==
R. P. R. of Kalki called the film inferior to the source play.
