= Kerala State Television Award for Best Actor =

Annual Indian television award

- State award for contributions to Malayalam television
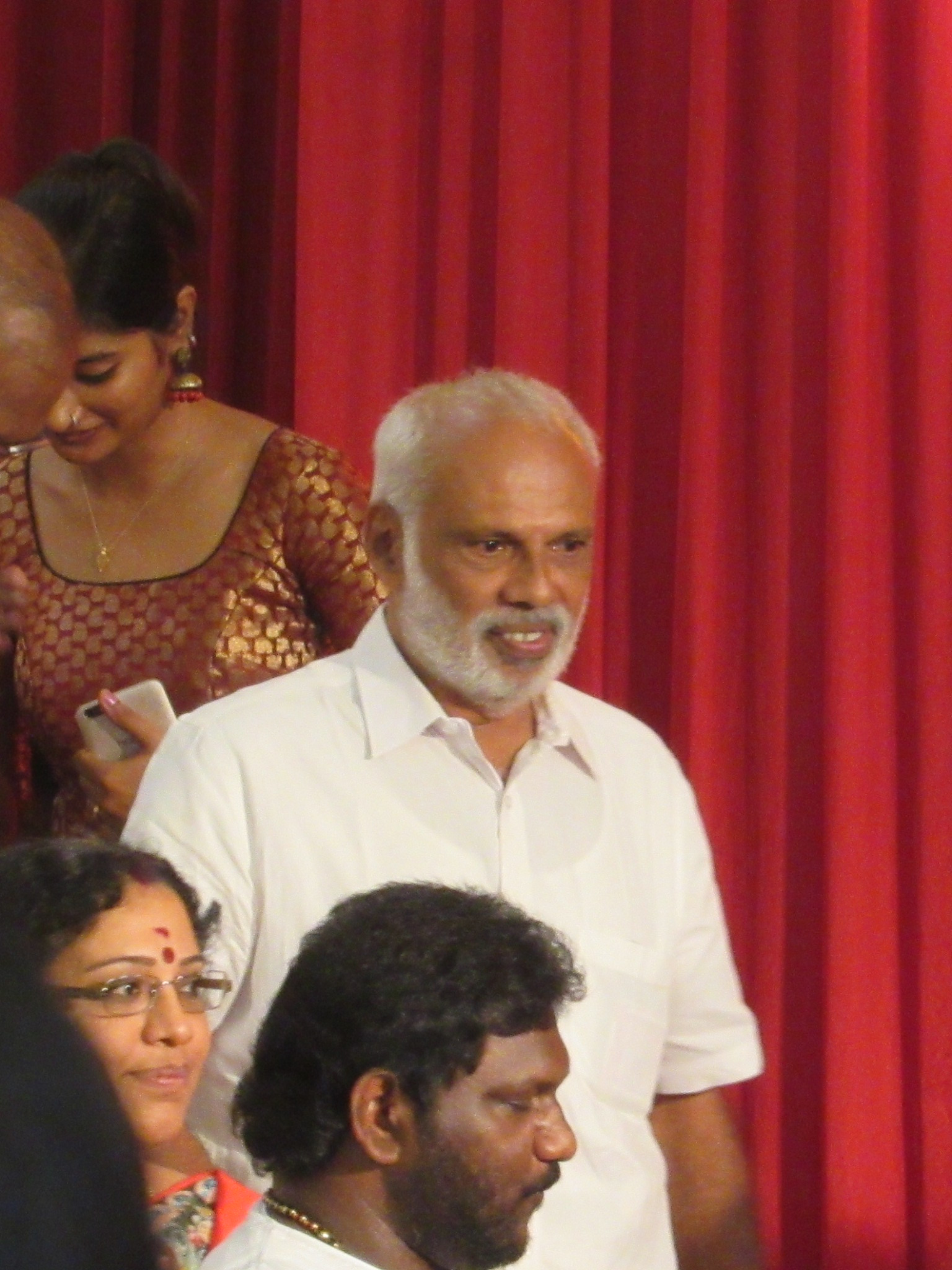
- M. R. Gopakumar, Most Wins (3 times)
- Awarded for: Best performance by an actor in a leading role
- Sponsored by: Kerala State Chalachitra Academy
- Final award: 2020

Highlights
- Last winner: Shivaji Guruvayoor
- Website: www.keralafilm.com

The Kerala State Television Award for Best Actor is an honour presented annually at the Kerala State Television Awards of India to an actor for the best performance in a leading role in a Malayalam telefilm or serial. Until 1997, the awards were managed directly by the Department of Cultural Affairs, Government of Kerala. Since 1998, the Kerala State Chalachitra Academy, an autonomous non-profit organisation functioning under the Department of Cultural Affairs, has been exercising control over the awards.

== Superlatives ==
Superlative	Actor	Record
Actor with most awards	M. R. Gopakumar	3

== Winners ==
The 2008 recipient Murali for Aranazhikaneram and 2013 recipient Salim Kumar for Parethante Paribhavangal are the only 2 actors to win the National Film Award for Best Actor, Kerala State Film Award for Best Actor and Kerala State Television Award under the category of Best Actor

Year	Photo of Winners	Recipient(s)	Tele film / serial(s)	Ref.
2023		Anoop Krishnan	kanmashi	
2022		Shivaji Guruvayoor	Bharthavinte Snehithan	
2021		Ishaq	Pira	
2020		Shivaji Guruvayoor	Kathayariyathe	
2019		Madhu Vibhakar	Kunjiraman	
2018		Raghavan	Dehantharam	
2017		Krishnan Balakrishnan	Kaligandaki	
2016		Gireesh Kumar K.	Ooriyattam	
2015		Munshi Baiju	Nadakanthyam	
2014		Murukan	Unmadham	
2013		Salim Kumar	Parethante Paribhavangal	
2012		Mukundan	Sandhya Ragam	
2011		Babu Annur	Daivatinte Swantham Devooty	
2010		Ashok Kumar	Planning	
2010		Achuthanandan	Planning	
2009		Manikandan Pattambi	Unaru	
2008		Murali	Aranazhikaneram	
2007		K. B. Ganesh Kumar	Madavam	
2006		T. G. Ravi	Nizhalroopam	
2005		Siddique	Samasya; Annum Mazhayayirunnu	
2004		Prem Prakash	Avicharitham	
2003		Ravi Vallathol	American Dreams	
2002		Ratheesh	Anna	
2001		Nedumudi Venu	Avasthantharangal	
2000		Sreenath		
1999		M. R. Gopakumar	Pulari; Balyakalasmaranakal	
1998		M. R. Gopakumar	Pattolaponnu	
1997				
1996				
1995				
1994		M. R. Gopakumar	Koodaram	
1993		Jose Prakash	Mikhayelinte Santhathikal	

== See also ==
- List of Asian television awards
