= Chakoram =

- Film poster
- Directed by: M. A. Venu
- Written by: A. K. Lohithadas
- Produced by: V. V. Babu
- Starring: Shanthi Krishna; Murali; Philomina; Kuthiravattom Pappu; Mamukkoya; Cochin Hanifa; Sudheesh
- Cinematography: Prathapan
- Edited by: Hariharaputhran
- Music by: Johnson
- Production company: Srushti Films International
- Distributed by: Chandrakanth Release
- Release date: 26 November 1994
- Running time: 145 minutes
- Country: India
- Language: Malayalam

Chakoram (lit. 'Chakora'; transl. Pheasant) is a 1994 Indian Malayalam romantic drama film written by A. K. Lohithadas and directed by M. A. Venu. The film stars Shanthi Krishna and Murali in the lead roles along with Philomina, Kuthiravattom Pappu, Mamukkoya, Cochin Hanifa and Sudheesh in other pivotal roles. The music for the film was composed by Johnson.

Shanthi Krishna won the Kerala State Film Award for Best Actress for her role as Sharadammini, and Venu won the Kerala State Film Award for Best Debut Director.

== Plot ==
The film is about an arrogant and bold spinster, in her thirties, whose life turns upside-down with the arrival of an ex-army-man in the neighbourhood.

== Cast ==
- Shanthi Krishna as Sharadammini
- Murali as Lance Naik Mukundan Menon
- Philomina as Amminiyamma
- Kuthiravattom Pappu as Ammama
- Mamukkoya as Pookunju
- Cochin Haneefa as Sreedharan Kartha
- Sudheesh as Unni
- Santhakumari
- Bobby Kottarakkara as Govindankutty
- Ottapalam Pappan
- Reshmi Soman as Sunanda
- Anila Sreekumar

== Soundtrack ==
Soundtrack was composed by Johnson and lyrics were written by Kaithapram

Song	Artist(s)
"Thaanaro Thannaro"	MG Sreekumar
"Paalaazhithirakalil"	KJ Yesudas, Sujatha Mohan
"Naattumaavin"	KS Chithra
"Naattumaavin"	KJ Yesudas, KS Chithra
