= Swamy Sreenarayana Guru =

- Directed by: Krishnaswamy
- Written by: Dr. L. Salim
- Screenplay by: Dr. L. Salim
- Starring: Adoor Bhavani; K. P. A. C. Azeez; Divyashree; KPAC Sunny
- Cinematography: Kannan Narayanan
- Edited by: Ramesh
- Music by: Mohammed Subair
- Production company: Gurudeva Pictures
- Distributed by: Gurudeva Pictures
- Release date: 22 November 1986
- Country: India
- Language: Malayalam

Swamy Sreenarayana Guru is a 1986 Indian Malayalam film, directed by Krishnaswamy. The film stars Adoor Bhavani, K. P. A. C. Azeez, Divyashree and KPAC Sunny in the lead roles. The film has musical score by Mohammed Subair.

== Cast ==
- Adoor Bhavani
- K. P. A. C. Azeez
- Divyashree
- KPAC Sunny
- K. V. Sivadasan
- L. P. Athiyannoor
- Master Sabu
- Nisha Chowdhary
- Ravi Menon
- Vanchiyoor Madhavan Nair

== Soundtrack ==
The music was composed by Mohammed Subair and the lyrics were written by Dr. L. Salim, Brahmasri Anandaji Gurudeva Thiruvadikal, Sreenarayana Guru and Vayalar Madhavankutty.

No.	Song	Singers	Lyrics	Length (m:ss)
1	"Aakaashaveedhi"	C. S. Radhika	Dr. L. Salim	
2	"Aathmaavineebhoovil"	K. P. Brahmanandan	Brahmasri Anandaji Gurudeva Thiruvadikal	
3	"Avanivanennariyunnathokke Orthaal"	K. P. Brahmanandan	Sreenarayana Guru	
4	"Daivame Kaathukollangu" (Slokam)		Sreenarayana Guru	
5	"Kulirmathi Vadane"	K. J. Yesudas	Vayalar Madhavankutty	
6	"Oru Jathi Oru Matham"	K. P. Brahmanandan	Sreenarayana Guru	
7	"Shivagirinaadhaa Gurudevaa"	K. J. Yesudas	Dr. L. Salim	

== Notes ==
Swamy Sreenarayana Guru is the debut independent movie of G. Krishnaswamy. Later he has directed movies like Koodiayattam (1985), Paavadaprayathil (1989) Maanmizhiyaal (1990), Njan Anaswaran (2013), Ula (2018) etc. Previously he worked as an assistant director of P. Padmarajan's Peruvazhiyambalam (1979). He has directed documentaries like "Aayusum Aarogyavum Aayurvedhathil","Rabies","Hare Shivagiri". He is the chairman of History & Epic Fundamental Research. Another movie Sree Narayana Guru by PA Backer was also released in 1986. Yugapurushan is a 2010 Indian Malayalam-language film about the life and times of Sree Narayana Guru.
