= Chinna Mul Peria Mul =

- Title card
- Directed by: N. S. Rajbharath
- Written by: N. S. Rajbharath
- Produced by: Indra
- Starring: Raja Alfred; Sreenath; Shanthi Krishna
- Cinematography: Tiwari
- Edited by: R. B. Thilak; D. S. Maniyam
- Music by: Shankar–Ganesh
- Production company: Indra Creations
- Release date: 18 September 1981
- Running time: 95 minutes
- Country: India
- Language: Tamil

Chinna Mul Peria Mul (transl. Hour Hand, Minute Hand; lit. 'Small Thorn, Big Thorn') is 1981 Indian Tamil-language crime thriller film written and directed by N. S. Rajbharath. The film stars Raja Alfred, Sreenath and Shanthi Krishna, with Jayaram, Madhan Veerappan, Sumangali, Vani and Baby Anju in supporting roles. It was released on 18 September 1981.

== Plot ==
A blind woman Radha's roommate Usha is murdered by a man, who leaves behind his bracelet. Radha stumbles upon the bracelet and reads the man's name – Anand – on it via Braille. When Anand returns to collect the bracelet, Radha, having anticipated he would come to murder her as well, stabs him in the stomach with a pair of scissors.

== Cast ==
Male cast

- Raja Alfred as Anand
- Sreenath as Dr. Arun
- Jayaram as Justice Madhana Gopal
- Madhan as Inspector Kumar
- Veerappan as Krishnamoorthy

Female cast

- Shanthi Krishna as Radha
- Sumangali as Usha
- Vani as Dolly's mother
- Baby Anju as Dolly

== Soundtrack ==
Music composed by Shankar–Ganesh.

Track listing
| No. | Title | Lyrics | Singer(s) | Length |
|---|---|---|---|---|
| 1. | "Iru Vizhigal Malarthathamma" | Poonkuyilan | S. Janaki, P. Jayachandran | 3:45 |
| 2. | "Iravinil Or Poonguyil" | Vaali | S. Janaki | 4:18 |
| Total length: | | | | 8:03 |

== Reception ==
Nalini Sastry of Kalki praised Rajbharath's direction for maintaining the thrill and suspense.
