= Lorry (film) =

- Directed by: Bharathan
- Written by: Padmarajan
- Produced by: Rajamma Hari
- Starring: Achankunju; Balan K. Nair; Nithya; Prathap Pothan; Meena; Santhakumari
- Cinematography: Ashok Kumar
- Edited by: K. Narayanan
- Music by: M. S. Viswanathan
- Production company: Supriya Films
- Release date: 23 August 1980
- Country: India
- Language: Malayalam

Lorry is a 1980 Malayalam film directed by Bharathan and written by Padmarajan. It stars Achankunju, Balan K. Nair, Nithya, Meena and Prathap Pothan.

== Cast ==
- Prathap Pothen as Dasappan
- Achankunju as Velan
- Balan K. Nair as Ouseph
- Nithya as Rani
- Sankaradi
- Bahadoor
- Meena
- Santhakumari as Ammu

== Soundtrack ==
The music was composed by M. S. Viswanathan and the lyrics were written by Poovachal Khader.

No.	Song	Singers	Lyrics	Length (m:ss)
1	"Arinju Naam Thammil"	S. Janaki, Chorus	Poovachal Khader	
2	"Kannippoovininnu Kalyaanam"	P. Susheela, Jolly Abraham	Poovachal Khader	
