= Soorya Daaham =

- Directed by: Mohan
- Written by: Perumpadavam Sreedharan
- Screenplay by: Mohan
- Starring: Sukumari; Shobha; Sukumaran; P. K. Abraham
- Cinematography: Hemachandran
- Edited by: G. Venkittaraman
- Music by: G. Devarajan
- Production company: Deepa Films
- Distributed by: Deepa Films
- Release date: 11 July 1980
- Country: India
- Language: Malayalam

Soorya Daaham is a 1980 Indian Malayalam film, directed by Mohan, who also wrote the screenplay. The film stars Sukumari, Shobha, Sukumaran and P. K. Abraham in the lead roles, with music by G. Devarajan.

== Cast ==
- Sukumari
- Shobha
- Sukumaran
- P. K. Abraham
- Ravi Menon
- Innocent

== Soundtrack ==
The music was composed by G. Devarajan and the lyrics were written by Bichu Thirumala.

No.	Song	Singers	Lyrics	Length (m:ss)
1	"Aayiram Maarivil"	P. Madhuri	Bichu Thirumala	
2	"Pankajaakshi Unnineeli"	Chorus, Latha Raju	Bichu Thirumala	
3	"Therottam"	P. Susheela	Bichu Thirumala	
