= Oru Mukham Pala Mukham =

- Directed by: P. K. Joseph
- Written by: Manimaran
- Produced by: Raja Cheriyan; Sasi Menon
- Starring: Ratheesh; Mohanlal; Srividya; Mammootty
- Cinematography: B. R. Ramakrishna
- Edited by: K. Narayanan
- Music by: A. T. Ummer
- Release date: 6 May 1983
- Country: India
- Language: Malayalam

Oru Mukham Pala Mukham (transl. One face different face) is a 1983 Indian Malayalam-language action film directed by P. K. Joseph, starring Ratheesh, Srividya, Mohanlal, and Mammootty. Ratheesh plays Raveendran Thampi, who takes vengeance against Subhadramma Thankachi (Srividya), for killing his family and adopting him. Mohanlal plays the real son of Subhadramma Thankachi, while Mammootty plays Raveendran Thampi's real father.

== Plot ==
Having killed a man while driving drunk, Raveendran is imprisoned and learns from his cellmate, Krishnan, that he is the son of Sankara Narayanan Thampi, and rightful heir to the Thampi family fortune. His adoptive mother, Subhadramma Thankachi, is responsible for wrecking the Thampi family by exchanging Raveendran with her own son, Sukumaran, so that he could claim the family fortune. Raveendran gets revenge against his adoptive mother, with the help of his new girlfriend, Sridevi. He plans to destroy her. Sukumaran returns as the teenage son of a rich man and heir to the wealth. Subhadramma realises her mistakes and tries to seek Raveendran's forgiveness, but she is kidnapped by Rajendran and his gang. Raveendran and Sukumaran fight her enemies. Subhadramma dies trying to save her son's life, and is forgiven by Raveendran and Sukumaran for what she did.

== Cast ==
- Ratheesh as Raveendran Thampi
- Srividya as Subhadramma Thankachi
- Mohanlal as Sukumaran Thampi
- Nellikode Bhaskaran as Krishnan
- T. G. Ravi as Shekhar
- Seema as Sridevi
- Kuthiravattam Pappu as Rajendran
- Ravi Menon as Madhavan
- Santhakumari as Rajamma
- Jagathy Sreekumar
- Mala Aravindan
- Mammootty as Sankara Narayanan Thampi
- Unnimary as Sarada
- Jose Prakash as Rajasekharan Thampi
- P. K. Abraham

== Soundtrack ==
The music was composed by A. T. Ummer with lyrics by Poovachal Khader.

No.	Song	Singers	Lyrics	Length (m:ss)
1	"Ente Udal Chernnu"	S. Janaki	Poovachal Khader	
2	"Oru Sneha Vaaridhipole"	K. J. Yesudas, Sujatha Mohan	Poovachal Khader	
3	"Ponnin Pushpangal"	S. Janaki, Chorus	Poovachal Khader	
4	"Thoomanjin Thooval Veeshi"	K. J. Yesudas, S. Janaki	Poovachal Khader	
