= P. K. Abraham =

Indian actor in Malayalam movies

- Occupation: Film actor
- Years active: 1973–1996

P. K. Abraham was an Indian actor in Malayalam movies. He acted in more than 100 Malayalam films. He played supporting and character roles during the 1970s and 1980s. He worked for Malayalamanorama. He died in 1996.

== Filmography ==
=== 1970s ===
Year	Title	Role	Notes
1973	Yaamini	Govindan	
1975	Chalanum		
1975	Kaamam Krodham Moham		
1975	Criminals		
1976	Light House	Rajasekharan, Vikraman	Double role
1976	Swapnadanam	Psychiatrist	
1976	Abhinandanam	Prabhakaran	
1976	Themmadi Velappan	Gopalan	
1977	Satyavan Savithri		
1977	Aparadhi	DSP	
1977	Sreemad Bhagavad Geetha		
1977	Kaduvaye Pidicha Kiduva		
1977	Ashtamangalyam		
1977	Agninakshathram		
1977	Vezhambal		
1977	Anugraham	Krishnan	
1978	Vayanadan Thamban		
1978	Madhurikkunna Raathri		
1978	Madanolsavam		
1978	Jalatharangam		
1978	Bandhanam		
1979	Tharangam		
1979	Vijayanum Veeranum	Shivasankaran	
1979	Lovely		
1979	Indradhanussu	Balan Mashu	
1979	Vadaka Veedu		
1979	Oru Raagam Pala Thaalam		
1979	Amrithachumbanam		
1979	Sarapancharam	Saudamini's Husband	
1979	Aavesham	Ammavan	

=== 1980s ===
Year	Title	Role	Notes
1980	Paalattu Kunjikannan	Maharajah of Sreerangam	
1980	Nattuchakkeruttu		
1980	Air Hostess		
1980	Soorya Daaham		
1980	Saraswathi Yaamam	Muthalali	
1980	Muthuchippikal		
1980	Meen		
1981	Hamsa Geetham		
1981	Venal		
1981	Greeshma Jwala	Priest	
1981	Nidra	Raju's father	
1981	Kolilakkam		
1981	Ahimsa		
1981	Archana Teacher		
1982	Ee Nadu	College Principal	
1982	Paanjajanyam	Sekhara Pilla	
1982	Ithiri Neram Othiri Kaaryam		
1982	Vaazhvey Maayam		Tamil film
1982	Irattimadhuram	Vakkel Mahadevan	
1982	Football	Celine's father	
Innalenkil Nale	Advocate		
1983	Bandham		
1983	Nathi Muthal Nathi Vare	R. C. Nair	
1983	Himam	Varma	
1983	Oru Mukham Pala Mukham		
1983	Enne Njan Thedunnu	Jayan	
1984	Swarna Gopuram		
1984	Jeevitham	Avarachen muthalali	
1984	Umaanilayam	Shivasankara Pilla	
1984	Uyarangalil		
1984	Arante Mulla Kochu Mulla	Priest	
1984	Thathamme Poocha Poocha		
1984	Mangalam Nerunnu		
1984	Sandarbham		
1984	Idavelakku Sesham	Judge Balagopala Menon	
1984	Kadamattathachan	Bishop	
1984	Aksharangal		
1984	Ethirppukal	Thavalam Chandran Pilla	
Sreekrishna Parunthu			
1985	Akkacheyude Kunjuvava		
1985	Vellam		
1985	Nirakkoottu		
1985	Madhuvidhu Theerum Mumbe	Mathew Varghese	
1986	Nimishangal	Dr. Menon	
1986	Veendum		
1986	Shyama	Krishnan Nambyar	
1987	Kaanan Kothichu		
1987	New Delhi	Maria's Father	
1987	Kathakku Pinnil	Sethumadhavan Nair	

=== 1990s ===
Year	Title	Role	Notes
1990	Nammude Naadu		
1993	Jackpot	School Principal	
1993	Dhruvam	Chidambaram	
1994	Ponthan Mada		
1996	Kaduvathoma		
