= Nattuchakkeruttu =

- Directed by: Ravi Gupthan
- Written by: P. K. Abraham
- Screenplay by: P. K. Abraham
- Produced by: Krishnaswami Reddiar
- Starring: Sheela; Sreelatha Namboothiri; Kundara Johny; Meena Menon
- Cinematography: Kanal
- Edited by: A. Sukumaran
- Music by: G. Devarajan
- Production company: Sreevidya Cine Enterprises
- Distributed by: Sreevidya Cine Enterprises
- Release date: 25 December 1980
- Country: India
- Language: Malayalam

Nattuchakkeruttu is a 1980 Indian Malayalam film, directed by Ravi Gupthan and produced by Krishnaswami Reddiar. The film stars Sheela, Sreelatha Namboothiri, Kundara Johny and Meena Menon in the lead roles. The film has musical score by G. Devarajan.

== Cast ==
- Sheela
- Sreelatha Namboothiri
- Kundara Johny
- Meena Menon
- P. K. Abraham
- Sankar Mohan

== Soundtrack ==
The music was composed by G. Devarajan and the lyrics were written by Devadas.

No.	Song	Singers	Lyrics	Length (m:ss)
1	"Veene Mani Veene"	P. Madhuri	Devadas	
