= Ithu Njangalude Katha =

- Newspaper Ad
- Directed by: P. G. Viswambharan
- Written by: Pavithran; Robert–Rajasekar
- Produced by: Subrahmaniam Kumar
- Starring: Sreenath; Shanthi Krishna; Mukesh; Manianpilla Raju; Santhosh; Jagathy Sreekumar
- Cinematography: Anandakuttan
- Edited by: G. Venkitaraman
- Music by: Johnson
- Release date: 6 August 1982
- Country: India
- Language: Malayalam

Ithu Njangalude Katha (transl. This Is Our Story) is a 1982 Indian Malayalam-language film directed by P. G. Viswambharan. This was the second film of actor Mukesh after the 1982 film Balloon. It is a remake of the Tamil film Palaivana Solai. The film was a commercial success.

== Plot ==
The lives of five friends are caught as they fall in love with the same girl.

== Cast ==
- Shanthi Krishna as Prabha
- Sreenath as Raghu
- Mukesh as Ramankutty
- Jagathy Sreekumar as Vasu
- Manianpilla Raju as Santhosh
- Santhosh as Joseph
- Sukumari as Naniyamma
- Santhakumari as Joseph's Mother
- Thikkurisi Sukumaran Nair as Ramankutty's Uncle
- Jose Prakash as Mathachan
- P. G. Viswambharan as Himself

== Soundtrack ==
The music was composed by Johnson and the lyrics were written by P. Bhaskaran.

The song Mavelikum Pookalam achieved a cult status as a popular Onam song in later years.

No.	Song	Singers	Lyrics	Length (m:ss)
1	"Ente Kadha Ninte Kadha"	P. Jayachandran, J. M. Raju	P. Bhaskaran	
2	"Mavelikkum Pookalam"	K. J. Yesudas	P. Bhaskaran	
3	"Navavarshathin Rajani"	K. J. Yesudas	P. Bhaskaran	
4	"Swarna Mukile"	S. Janaki	P. Bhaskaran	
