= Mangalam Nerunnu =

- Directed by: Mohan
- Written by: Maniswami
- Produced by: Purandan Films
- Starring: Nedumudi Venu; Sreenath; Madhavi; Shanthikrishna; Mammootty
- Cinematography: Shaji N. Karun
- Edited by: G. Venkittaraman
- Music by: Ilaiyaraaja
- Distributed by: Gandhimathi films
- Release date: 22 June 1984
- Country: India
- Language: Malayalam

Mangalam Nerunnu is a 1984 Indian Malayalam-language film, directed by Mohan. The film stars Nedumudi Venu, Madhavi, Shanthikrishna and Sreenath. The film has musical score and songs composed by Ilaiyaraaja.

== Cast ==
- Nedumudi Venu as Menon
- P. K. Abraham
- Premji as Nanu Nair
- Sreenath as Madhu
- Madhavi as Rajini
- Shanthikrishna as Usha
- Mammootty as Babu
- Philomina as Meenakshiyamma
- K. P. A. C. Sunny as Madhu's father
- Prathapachandran
- Baby Shalini as Younger Usha (Cameo)
- P. K. Abraham
- Thilakan as Kurup
- Meenakumari
- Jose Prakash

== Soundtrack ==
The music was composed by Ilaiyaraaja and the lyrics were written by M. D. Rajendran.

No.	Song	Singers	Lyrics	Length (m:ss)
1	"Alliyilam Poovo"	Krishnachandran	M. D. Rajendran	4:42
2	"Rithubhedakalppana"	K. J. Yesudas, Kalyani Menon	M. D. Rajendran	4:10

== view film ==
- mangalam nerunnu
