= Kalika (film) =

- Directed by: Balachandra Menon
- Screenplay by: Balachandra Menon
- Story by: B. Mohanachandran
- Produced by: Krishnaswamy Reddiar
- Starring: Sheela; Sukumaran; Adoor Bhasi; Venu Nagavally and Sreenath
- Cinematography: Vipin Das
- Edited by: A. Sukumaran
- Music by: G. Devarajan
- Production company: Sreelekshmipriya Productions
- Distributed by: Sreelekshmipriya Productions
- Release date: 12 June 1980
- Country: India
- Language: Malayalam

Kalika (transl. Flower bud) is a 1980 Indian Malayalam-language drama film written and directed by Balachandra Menon and produced by Krishnaswamy Reddiar. The film stars Sheela, Sukumaran, Adoor Bhasi and Venu Nagavally. The musical score was composed by G. Devarajan.

== Plot ==
One evening, Thoma consumes liquor as usual from Vasu's toddy shop. Thoma boasts about his bravery only to be challenged by another consumer who asks him to take the shortest route to his house via Ammankavu (traditional natural sacred space; not quite a temple). Ammankavu is a source of fear for the villagers, especially at night. Though Vasu insists Thoma to wait until he shuts down the shop, Thoma is reluctant and leaves alone. Despite having an alternate path to reach home, Thoma goes via Ammankavu. The next morning, the villagers find Thoma's corpse there, adding to the list of mysterious murders.

Vasu, who is the caretaker of Sadan's house writes to Sadan about selling his house. The house has been kept locked for years with people believing that it to be haunted. After the death of his parents, Sadan was taken away to another place, where he grew up in the company of Ikkaka, Joseph and Zacharia. Though each of them is now at different locations engaged in their respective jobs, they all come when Sadan invites them to visit his native place. Four of them come to Sadan's and stay in his house. Zacharia, whose father was a spiritual magician, smells something fishy and offers some rituals and poojas. One night, he hears a lady's cries, and follows them.

The voice tells him that it is Ammankavu Goddess, and she has been imprisoned by a woman. Before Zacharia can ask anything else, Joseph comes to the scene and they no longer hear the voice. Scaria advises his friends not to go outside after evening hours.

Sadan is given the task of cooking. Joseph's task is to buy groceries, whereas Scaria performs rituals in the house. Joseph is interested in roaming here and there. Sadan gets interested in a lady at the market selling vegetables, (later found to be the daughter of Vasu). Though Joseph is initially interested in Vasu's wife Gomathy, after knowing Sadan's affair, he stays out.

Zacharia finds a literary composition of mantras in Sanskrit in the house. He seeks the help of Kalika, a teacher, to translate it. Kalika warns him that a small mistake in reciting will have a bad result. Joseph falls for Kalika. Even after conducting a vasectomy, Gomathy becomes pregnant. Zacharia has some doubts about whether something is wrong with his rituals. Joseph senses that something is wrong at Kalika's house, but he is too attracted to her. One day Vasu says that Gomathy is not well and became ill after she ate fruit provided by Kalika. Zacharia examines her and then brings his father to perform further rituals. He tells Ikkaka and Sadan not to leave their house and also to keep an eye on Joseph. However, when Kalika's servant comes and invites Joseph, he goes secretly to her house. Kalika kills Joseph, just before Zacharia arrives with his father.

Zacharia's father performs the rituals and poojas and frees the spirits held captive by Kalika. Since Kalika has to lose her chastity to get rid of her negative powers forever, Ikkaka rapes her, and so all tasks are completed. However Ikkaka feels guilty about the rape, and he is willing to accept her.

Zacharia's father tells him the story of how Kalika was born as a normal Brahmin girl. After her father's death, she and her bed-ridden mother were taken care by a relative who was an alcoholic. He molested her repeatedly, which created a desire for revenge in her. Witnessing her daughter's plight, Kalika's mother teaches her certain mantras. Kalika practises them for years and regains her virginity and immense power. Since she presumed every man to be bad, she killed people who came to Ammankavu at night when she performs her rituals at the temple.

The next morning they are informed that Kalika committed suicide. Ikkaka, Zacharia and his father leave, while Sadan remains in his house with his love waiting for him outside.

== Cast ==
- Sheela as Kalika
- Sukumaran as Joseph
- Adoor Bhasi as Vasu
- Venu Nagavally as Sadan
- Jose
- Sreelatha Namboothiri as Gomathy
- K. P. A. C. Azeez as Thoma
- Balan K Nair as Ikkaakka (Jamal)
- Kottarakkara Sreedharan Nair as Appachan
- Sreenath as Zacharia
- T. P. Madhavan as Kalika's Servant
- Velayudhan Keezhillam
- Shanmugam Pilla
- Balan Thirumala
- Sandhya
- Santhi Sree
- Lalitha

== Soundtrack ==
The music was composed by G. Devarajan.

No.	Song	Singers	Lyrics	Length (m:ss)
1	"Thankathidamballe"	P. Madhuri	Devadas	
2	"Vinnavar Naattile"	K. J. Yesudas, P. Madhuri	Devadas	
