= Apaaratha =

1992 Malayalam film directed by I. V. Sasi

- VCD cover
- Directed by: I. V. Sasi
- Written by: Sreekumaran Thampi
- Produced by: Anu Enterprises; I. V. Sasi
- Starring: Rahman; Sukanya; Urvasi; Siddique; M. G. Soman
- Cinematography: V. Jayaram
- Edited by: K. Narayanan
- Music by: Ilayaraja
- Release date: 9 April 1992
- Running time: 130 minutes
- Country: India
- Language: Malayalam

Apaaratha is a 1992 Indian Malayalam-language film produced and directed by I. V. Sasi. The film stars Rahman, Sukanya (in her Malayalam debut), Urvashi, Siddique and M. G. Soman. The plot follows a person who is trying to find a job and the hardships he has to face after managing it later.

== Cast ==
- Rahman as Prathapan
- Sukanya as Surya
- Urvasi as Prabha
- Siddique as Suresh
- Jagathy Sreekumar as Minnal Baby
- Nedumudi Venu as K. P. Menon
- M. G. Soman as Singapore Pillai
- Rajan P. Dev as Theeppori Madhavan
- Mamukkoya as Jamal
- Innocent as SI Lonappan
- K. P. A. C. Lalitha as Arival Kochammini
- Shanthi Krishna as Soumini
- Janardhanan as Phalgunan
- Sreenath as Sudhakaran
- Unni Mary as Nalini
- Roshni as Renuka
- Geetha Vijayan
- Kalpana as Mary
- Raghu as Hari
- Ramu as Jayapalan Panicker
- Kunchan as Abdullah

== Soundtrack ==
Songs were composed by Ilaiyaraaja and lyrics by Sreekumaran Thampi. Ilayaraja later reused the song "Melle Melle Vannu" as "Valli Valli Ena" for Tamil film Deiva Vaakku.

1. "Karthaavuyarthezhunnetta" - P Jayachandran
2. "Melle Melle Vannu (male)" - KJ Yesudas
3. "Melle Melle Vannu (duet)" - KJ Yesudas, KS Chithra
4. "Pullankuzhal Nadham - KS Chithra
5. "Melle Melle (female)" - KS Chithra
