= K. P. A. C. Azeez =

Indian actor

Azeez
- Born: 27 November 1934; Vembayam, Thiruvananthapuram, Travancore (now Kerala, India)
- Died: 16 July 2003 (aged 68)
- Occupations: actor; Deputy Superintendent (D.Y.S.P)Kerala Police
- Years active: 1970–2000

Azeez (27 November 1934 – 16 July 2003) was an Indian actor in Malayalam cinema. He acted in more than 100 films. He came into the movie industry as a villain, and later, he started doing character roles, such as police officer, jailer, and minister. He was a Deputy superintendent (D.Y.S.P) in Kerala Police. He was a member of K.P.A.C. (Kerala People's Arts Club), which was a prominent leftist drama troupe in Kerala. Thus he got famous as "K.P.A.C Azeez".

== Early life and education ==
Azeez was born and raised in the village of Thekkadda near Vembayam in Thiruvananthapuram district in Kerala, India. He graduated from University College.

== Personal life ==
He was married to the late Sainam Beevi (teacher). The couple have three children, Naseema, A. M. Raja and Nazeera. His only son Raja Aziz is a Retired Sub Inspector in Kerala Police, and a television, cinema, and drama artist in Malayalam. His grand child Azna is professionally a band singer.

== Filmography ==
=== 1970s ===
Year	Title	Role	Notes
1970	Nishagandhi		
1974	Neelakannukal	Police officer	
1976	Vanadevatha	Kannan	
1976	Swapnadanam		
1978	Kodiyettam	Truck Driver	
1978	Tharoo Oru Janmam Koodi		
1979	Sayoojyam	Raghavan	
1979	Ival Oru Naadody		
1979	Peruvazhiyambalam	Prabhakaran Pillai	

=== 1980s ===
Year	Title	Role	Notes
1980	Kalika	Thoma	
1980	Chaakara	S.I. Shivaraman Nair	
1980	Chamaram	Indhu's father	
1981	Swarangal Swapnagal	Stephen	
1981	Ira Thedunna Manushyar		
1982	Thuranna Jail	Chachappan	
1982	Enikkum Oru Divasam	DYSP John Samuel	
1983	Oru Madapravinte Katha		
1983	Maniyara	Inspector Abdul Muthalif	
1983	Eettillam	Vijayan's father	
1983	Asthi	Govindan	
1984	Uyarangalil	Dinesh	
1984	Parannu Parannu Parannu	Ananthan	
1984	Kadamattathachan	Kattumooppan	
1984	Piriyilla Naam		
1984	Mukhamukham		
1984	Muthodumuthu	Madhavan Pillai	
1984	Chakkarayumma		
1985	Yathra	S.I. K.G Nair	
1985	Pacha Velicham	Surendran	
1985	Ithu Nalla Thamasha	SP J. Ashok	
1985	Aanakkorumma	Police officer	
1985	Ee Sabdam Innathe Sabdam	S.I. Raveendran	
1985	Onnanam Kunnil Oradi Kunnil		
1985	Naavadakku Paniyedukku		
1985	Nirakkoottu	Jailor	
1985	Irakal	Inspector Ramakrishnan	
1985	Ayanam	Illikkal Varkey	
1986	Nandi Veendum Varika	Right hand of Ananthan Nair	
1986	Rajavinte Makan	Adv. Panicker	
1986	Aavanazhi	Commissioner Azeez	
1986	Katturumbinum Kathu Kuthu		
1986	Swamy Sreenarayana Guru		
1986	Shyama	Thomas John	
1987	Anantaram	Gambler	
1988	Manu Uncle	Antony	
1988	Pattanapravesham	Circle Inspector Santhosh	
1988	Loose Loose Arappiri Loose		
1988	Thanthram	Antony	
1988	August 1	DIG Gopalan IPS	
1988	Dhinarathrangal	Minister	
1988	David David Mr. David		
1988	Witness	Rajagopalan Nair	
1989	Season	Jailor	
1989	Kaalal Pada	Punnakkadan's Advocate	
1989	Nair Saab	Devayya	
1989	Naduvazhikal	CI Bharathan	

=== 1990s ===
Year	Title	Role	Notes
1990	Nanma Niranjavan Sreenivasan		
1990	Mathilukal	Inspector	
1990	Kalikkalam	Annie's father	
1990	Vembanad		
1990	Ee Thanutha Veluppan Kalathu	C.I. Mukundan Kurup	
1991	Oru Prathyeka Ariyippu	Kattumooppan	
1992	Kauravar	C.I. Kannan Nair	
1992	Thalastaanam	Commissioner Satheeshan Nair	
1993	Janam	I.G. Madhavan Nair	
1993	Ekalavyan	IG Devadas IPS	
1994	Chief Minister K. R. Gowthami		
1994	Vidheyan		
1995	The King	Kandakuzhi Thankachan	
1995	Arabikadaloram	Inspector Mahendran	
1996	Mayooranritham	Avarachan	
1996	Dominic Presentation	D.I.G	
1996	Mahathma	Jailor Santhosh	
1997	Lelam	Kunnel Mathachen	
1998	Aaghosham	I. G. Menon	
1998	The Truth	CKC Nambiar	
1999	F. I. R.	DySP John Varghese	
1999	Stalin Sivadas	Interviewer DD	
1999	Swastham Grihabharanam	Pathrose	
1999	Vazhunnor	Kunjachan	
1999	Pathram	K.K. Nambiar	

=== 2000s ===
Year	Title	Role	Notes
2000	Indriyam	Kittuni	

== Television ==
- Velu Malu Circus (Doordarshan)
- Mahathmagandhi Colony (Asianet)
