= Naavadakku Paniyedukku =

- Directed by: A. R. Rajan
- Written by: Kaniyapuram Ramachandran
- Screenplay by: A. R. Rajan
- Produced by: A. R. Rajan
- Starring: Baby Kala; P. C. George; Aranmula Ponnamma; K. P. A. C. Azeez
- Cinematography: E. N. C. Nair
- Edited by: K. B. Singh
- Music by: V. Dakshinamoorthy
- Production company: Athulya Movie Makers
- Distributed by: Athulya Movie Makers
- Release date: 8 July 1985
- Country: India
- Language: Malayalam

Naavadakku Paniyedukku is a 1985 Indian Malayalam film, directed and produced by A. R. Rajan. The film stars Baby Kala, P. C. George, Aranmula Ponnamma K. P. A. C. Azeez and M. R. Somasekharan Nair in the lead roles. The film has musical score by V. Dakshinamoorthy.

== Cast ==
- Baby Kala
- P. C. George
- Aranmula Ponnamma
- K. P. A. C. Azeez
- O. P. Pillai
- M. R. Somasekharan Nair

== Soundtrack ==
The music was composed by V. Dakshinamoorthy and the lyrics were written by Mavelikkara Devamma.

No.	Song	Singers	Lyrics	Length (m:ss)
1	"Archana Cheytheedaam"	K. J. Yesudas	Mavelikkara Devamma	
2	"Kaithozhaam"	Ambili	Mavelikkara Devamma	
3	"Saaradhi Njangade"	Chorus, C. O. Anto	Mavelikkara Devamma	
