= Visa (film) =

1983 Indian Malayalam-language film directed by Balu Kiriyath

- Poster
- Directed by: Balu Kiriyath
- Screenplay by: Balu Kiriyath; N. P. Abu
- Story by: G. Vivekanandan
- Based on: Bombayil Oru Madhuvidhu by G. Vivekanandan
- Produced by: N. P. Abu
- Starring: Sreenath; Mammootty; Mohanlal; Shanthi Krishna; Jalaja
- Cinematography: Vipin Das
- Edited by: G. Venkittaraman
- Music by: Jithin Shyam
- Production company: Priya Films
- Distributed by: Priya Films And Chalachitra
- Release date: 29 April 1983
- Country: India
- Language: Malayalam

Visa is a 1983 Indian Malayalam-language comedy-drama film co-written and directed by Balu Kiriyath. It is based on the short story Bombayil Oru Madhividhu by G. Vivekanandan. The film stars Sreenath, Mammootty, Mohanlal, Shanthi Krishna, Jalaja, along with T. R. Omana, Balan K. Nair and Sathaar. The film has a musical score by Jithin Shyam. The film was a commercial success at the box office. Mohanlal got a take off as a comedy actor for the first time through this film.

== Plot ==
Balan, Sharif, and Sunny are close friends, along with an elder brother like figure, Kutti Ali. Balan and Kutti Ali dream of going abroad, and Sharif, who works in Dubai, promises to help Balan secure a visa so he can marry Nalini. Trusting his assurance, Balan marries her, but soon Sharif himself faces serious problems with his passport and visa due to his partner’s fraud. Despite these setbacks, Balan and Kutti Ali, filled with hope, set out for Dubai but end up stuck in Bombay, where they fall victim to deceit and are forced to confront the harsh realities of life, as their dreams of prosperity are shattered by betrayal and disappointment. However, they find support from Abukka, who gives them a place to stay until they can obtain their visas. In the end, they finally get their visas, but fate has other plans in store.

== Cast ==
- Sreenath as Balakrishnan
- Mammootty as Sharif
- Mohanlal as Sunny
- Shanthi Krishna as Nalini Balakrishnan
- Jalaja as Sabira
- Bahadoor as Kutty Ali
- T. R. Omana
- Sathaar
- Balan K. Nair
- Anuradha (her first solo dance as a mujra dancer)
- Santhakumari
- P. A. Aziz
- Adam Ayub

== Production ==
Producer N. P. Abu after deciding to adapt G. Vivekanandan's short story Bombayil Oru Madhividhu into a film, invited Kabir Rowther for directing the film. But Ravuthar left the project due to creative differences and was replaced by Balu Kiriyath with a new theme.

== Soundtrack ==
The music was composed by Jithin Shyam and the lyrics were written by Bichu Thirumala.

No.	Song	Singers	Lyrics	Length
1	"Raathriyil Pookkunna"	S. Janaki	Bichu Thirumala	
2	"Sangathi Kozhanjallu"	Zero Babu	Bichu Thirumala	
3	"Swapnam Palathum"	K. J. Yesudas	Bichu Thirumala	
4	"Thaleeppeelikkaattinulliloru"	K. J. Yesudas, Jency	Bichu Thirumala	
