= Soorya =

Indian actress

soorya
- Born: Tamil Nadu
- Occupation: Film actress

Soorya is an Indian actress who appeared in Malayalam and Tamil films. She was a prominent actress in the 1980s and was well noted for her glamorous roles. She debuted with the film Parankimala in 1981.

== Filmography ==
=== Malayalam ===
- Parankimala (1981) as Thankam
- Odukkam Thudakkam (1982)
- Rathilayam (1983) as Sarasamma
- Adaminte Vaariyellu (1984) as Ammini
- Sandhyaykkenthinu Sindooram (1984)
- Poochakkoru Mookkuthi (1984) as Revathy's friend
- Vanitha Police (1984) as Kausalya
- Samantharam (1985) as Susan
- Sammelanam (1985) as Radha
- Paara (1985)
- Janakeeya Kodathi (1985) as Santha
- Uyarum Njaan Naadaake (1985) as Jagamma
- Arappatta Kettiya Gramathil (1986)
- Oru Yuga Sandhya (1986) as Ammu
- Meenamaasathile Sooryan (1986)
- Ilanjippookkal (1986)
- Oridathu (1986) as Malu
- Niramulla Ravukal (1986) as Saradha
- Dheem Tharikida Thom (1986)
- Kadhaykku Pinnil (1987) as Geetha
- Ithrayum Kaalam (1987) as Ambujam
- Ee Noottandile Mahaarogam (1987)
- Agnimuhoortham (1987)
- Kayyethum Doorath (1987)
- Kurukkan Rajavayi (1988)
- Inquilabinte Puthri (1988)
- Ore Thooval Pakshikal (1988)
- Chithram (1988) as Mooppan's daughter
- Marikkunnilla Njaan (1988)
- Samvalsarangal (1988)
- Oru Vadakkan Veeragatha (1989) as Blacksmith's daughter
- Aattinakkare (1989) as Komalam
- Rugmini (1989) as Saraswathi
- Minda Poochakku Kalyanam (1990) as Chandramathi
- Ee Thanutha Veluppan Kalathu (1990) as Ponnan's wife
- Vishnulokam (1991)
- Mahayanam (1991)
- Abhayam (1991)
- Bali (1995)
- Made In Usa (2005)

=== Tamil ===
- Kokkarakko (1983)
- Ponnu Pudichirukku (1984)
- Kannukku Mai Ezhuthu (1986)
- Piranthaen Valarnthaen (1986)
- Kavithai Paada Neramillai (1987)
- Manamagale Vaa (1988)
- Kadhal Enum Nadhiyinile (1989)
- Adhisaya Manithan (1990)
- Nila Pennae (1990) as Isaikki
- Thyagu (1990)
- Oru Veedu Iru Vasal (1990) as Shenbegam
- Kavalukku Kettikaran (1990) as Arivukodi's mother
- Nee Pathi Naan Pathi (1991)
- Sir I Love You (1991)
- Chinna Thayee (1992) as Samundi's wife
- Yermunai (1992)
- Konjum Kili (1993)
- Karpagam Vanthachu (1993) as Sarasu
