= Nimishangal =

- Directed by: Radhakrishnan (RK)
- Written by: P. K. Abraham
- Screenplay by: P. K. Abraham
- Starring: Mohanlal; Shankar; Jagathy Sreekumar; Captain Raju
- Edited by: G. Venkittaraman
- Music by: M. B. Sreenivasan
- Production company: Ancheril Films
- Distributed by: Ancheril Films
- Release date: 16 September 1986
- Country: India
- Language: Malayalam

Nimishangal is a 1986 Indian Malayalam-language film, directed by Radhakrishnan (RK). The film stars Mohanlal, Jagathy Sreekumar, Captain Raju and Shankar. The film has musical score by MB Sreenivasan. The story is based on "No orchids for miss blandish" by James Hadley chase

== Cast ==
- Mohanlal as Murali
- Shankar as Ravi
- Nalini as Maya
- Shanthi Krishna as Anitha
- Jagathy Sreekumar
- Captain Raju as Khalid
- Maniyanpilla Raju as Joseph
- Achankunju
- Chithra
- Adoor Bhavani
- Alummoodan as Kesava Pillai (PC)
- Disco Shanti
- Jagannatha Varma as Divan Bahdoor Rajapathmanabhan Thamby
- Janardanan as Damodaran Pilla (SI)
- Kundara Johnny as Vijayan
- Lalithasree as Doctor Shekhar's Wife
- Lalu Alex
- P. K. Abraham

== Soundtrack ==
The music was composed by M. B. Sreenivasan and the lyrics were written by P. Bhaskaran.

No.	Song	Singers	Lyrics	Length (m:ss)
1	"Mullapperiyaarinnu"	S. Janaki	P. Bhaskaran	
2	"Vaadiya Neelakkaadukal"	K. J. Yesudas	P. Bhaskaran	
