= Sandhya Vandanam (film) =

- Directed by: J. Sasikumar
- Written by: P. Ayyaneth
- Screenplay by: P. Ayyaneth
- Produced by: V. P .Dileep
- Starring: Lakshmi; Sukumaran; M. G. Soman; Adoor Bhasi
- Cinematography: N. A. Thara
- Edited by: V. P. Krishnan
- Music by: Songs L. P. R. Varma Background Music Johnson
- Production company: Sariga Films
- Distributed by: Sariga Films
- Release date: 23 September 1983
- Country: India
- Language: Malayalam

Sandhya Vandanam is a 1983 Indian Malayalam film, directed by J. Sasikumar and produced by V. P. Dileep. The film stars Lakshmi, Sukumaran, MG Soman and Adoor Bhasi in the lead roles. The film has musical score by L. P. R. Varma.

== Plot ==
Soudamini and Sarada are daughters of feudal lord Kuruppu in the village. Soudamini is in love with Sasi, son of their caretaker. Kuruppu learns about their relation and forbids his daughter from meeting Sasi. He also arranges Soudamini's wedding with Ramachandran, an engineer. Soudamini decides to elope with Sasi, however, her sister Sarada convinces Soudamini not to go for the sake of their family. Soudamini and Ramachandran get married, while a disheartened Sasi watches in pain. Sarada also marries a farmer, Madhavan Kutty.

Soudamini moves in with Ramachandran and starts a happy married life. Sasi finds job as a teacher and move to the same town. Kuruppu falls ill and passes away soon after the weddings. During the funeral, caretaker Pillai informs Ramachandran about the old relationship between Soudamini and Sasi. An upset Ramachandran confronts Soudamini. After an initial fight, the couple makes up.

Ramachandran's younger brother Venu happens to be studying in the same school where Sasi is working. Sasi is appointed as a home tutor for Venu. Soudamini and Sasi meet each other again. Ramachandran finds Sasi and Soudamini talking alone and misreads the situation. Ramachandran takes a pregnant Soudamini backs to her home and leaves her there. Soudamini is forced to leave her home in the night as her brother-in-law Madhavan Kutty does not want her there. Soudamini tries to ends her life, jumping into water, where Sasi finds her and give her solace.

== Cast ==
- Lakshmi as Soudamini a.k.a. Mini
- Sukumaran as Ramachandran
- MG Soman as Sasidharan Nair a.k.a. Sasi
- Adoor Bhasi as Charumoottil Kuruppu
- Manavalan Joseph as Pillai, father of Sasidharan
- Vijayavani as Sarada
- Achankunju as Bhaskaran Aasan
- K. P. Ummer as Ramachandran's father
- Kaduvakulam Antony as Kuttappan
- M. S. Thripunithura as Marar
- Philomina as Paru Amma
- Ravi Menon as Mammathu/Mammukka
- Sadhana (actress) as Kalyani

== Soundtrack ==
The music was composed by L. P. R. Varma and the lyrics were written by Vayalar Ramavarma.

No.	Song	Singers	Lyrics	Length (m:ss)
1	"Neelambari"	P. Susheela	Vayalar Ramavarma	
2	"Sandhyaa Vandanam"	K. J. Yesudas	Vayalar Ramavarma	
3	"Swarna Choodamani Chaarthi"	K. J. Yesudas	Vayalar Ramavarma	
4	"Thenilanji"	S. Janaki	Vayalar Ramavarma	
