= Swapnalokum =

- Directed by: John Peters
- Written by: John Peters; J. C. George (dialogues)
- Screenplay by: J. C. George
- Produced by: John Peters
- Starring: Shanthi Krishna; Sreenath; Jagathy Sreekumar; Shubha
- Cinematography: Vasanth Kumar
- Edited by: K. Narayanan
- Music by: Jerry Amaldev
- Production company: Hollywood Movies
- Distributed by: Hollywood Movies
- Release date: 20 August 1983
- Country: India
- Language: Malayalam

Swapnalokum is a 1983 Indian Malayalam film, directed and produced by John Peters. The film stars Shanthi Krishna, Sreenath, Jagathy Sreekumar and Shubha in the lead roles. The film has musical score by Jerry Amaldev.

== Cast ==
- Shanthi Krishna
- Sreenath
- Jagathy Sreekumar
- Shubha
- Prathapachandran
- Sathaar
- Augustine
- Santhakumari

== Soundtrack ==
The music was composed by Jerry Amaldev and the lyrics were written by O. N. V. Kurup.

No.	Song	Singers	Lyrics	Length (m:ss)
1	"May Maasa Souvarnna Pushpangalo"	P. Jayachandran, Sherin Peters	O. N. V. Kurup	
2	"Neela Gaganame"	Vani Jairam	O. N. V. Kurup	
3	"Paaduvaan Marannu"	S. Janaki	O. N. V. Kurup	
4	"Ponvelicham"	K. J. Yesudas	O. N. V. Kurup	
