= Enikku Vishakunnu =

Enikku Vishakkunnu
- Directed by: P. Bhaskaran
- Written by: Jaya Vijaya; Karimkunnam Chandran (dialogues)
- Screenplay by: Karimkunnam Chandran
- Produced by: Jaya Vijaya; Thomas Keepuram; M. A. John
- Starring: Nedumudi Venu; Ambika; Achankunju; Kottayam Valsalan
- Cinematography: Shaji N. Karun
- Edited by: N. Gopalakrishnan
- Music by: Jaya Vijaya
- Production company: Panchamrutham Productions
- Distributed by: Panchamrutham Productions
- Release date: 14 January 1983
- Country: India
- Language: Malayalam

Enikku Vishakkunnu is a 1983 Indian Malayalam film, directed by P. Bhaskaran and produced by Jaya Vijaya, Thomas Keeppuram and M. A. John. The film stars Nedumudi Venu, Ambika, Achankunju and Kottayam Valsalan in the lead roles. The film has musical score by Jaya Vijaya.

== Cast ==
- Nedumudi Venu as Chacko
- Ambika as Shantha
- Achankunju as Mathai
- Kottayam Valsalan as Rajappan
- Kaviyoor Ponnamma as Chinnamma
- Sukumari as Naaniparuthi
- N. S. Ittan as Pakkaran
- Mavelikkara Ramachandran
- Beena Bhaskaran as Marykutty
- Sreemandiram Rajalakhmi

== Soundtrack ==
The music was composed by Jaya Vijaya and the lyrics were written by P. Bhaskaran.

No.	Song	Singers	Lyrics	Length (m:ss)
1	"Onne Onne"	Jaya Vijaya	P. Bhaskaran	
2	"Pakalkkinaavoru"	K. J. Yesudas	P. Bhaskaran	
