= Belt Mathai =

- Directed by: T. S. Mohan
- Written by: Peruvaram Purushan; Velliman Vijayan (dialogues)
- Screenplay by: Velliman Vijayan
- Starring: Sukumaran; Adoor Bhasi; Jose Prakash; Krishnachandran
- Cinematography: Vipin Das
- Edited by: Balan
- Music by: Raveendran
- Production company: Mugal Arts
- Distributed by: Mugal Arts
- Release date: 25 April 1983
- Country: India
- Language: Malayalam

Belt Mathai is a 1983 Indian Malayalam film, directed by T. S. Mohan. The film stars Sukumaran, Adoor Bhasi, Jose Prakash, Ratheesh, Lalu Alex and Krishnachandran in the lead roles. The film has musical score by Raveendran. This film was Sukumaran portrayed action become famous of the film .

== Cast ==
- Sukumaran as Belt Mathayi / Mathews
- Ratheesh as Rajashekharan
- Lalu Alex as Adv. Indrapaalan
- Adoor Bhasi as Pokker
- Jose Prakash as Alexander
- Krishnachandran as Khadar
- Prameela as Mary
- Sathaar as Roy
- Unnimary as Rani
- Kuthiravattam Pappu as Gumathan Pachu Pilla
- Mala Aravindan as Idikatta Kuttan Pilla
- Sathyakala as Cicily
- Vanitha Krishnachandran as Amina
- Santo Krishnan as Gunda
- PR Menon as Mathew's father
- Anuradha as Geetha
- Sreenath as Tony
- Hari as Advocate

== Plot ==
The film begins with Mathayi, who was imprisoned for killing his pregnant sister, being released from jail. He goes back to his house, where he recalls the incident of his sister's death and his father's mourning face. His father had died later owing to illness in his old age.

In a nearby market, local gundas of Alexander, who is a rich businessman who manufactures duplicate products of branded items, are forcefully collecting money from the sellers there. Pokker Ikka, who runs a hotel cum t-shop did not have much money to give them. So the gundas attack him. However Mathai arrives there and beats them. Mathai is like a son for Pokker Ikka.

Pokker Ikka has a daughter Amina, who is in love with a peanut seller Khadar. Khadar is an orphan who was financially aided and brought up by Pokker Ikka.

Mathai is arrested by police for creating public nuisance in the market. Pokker approaches advocate Indrapalan to get Mathai released from jail. Being impressed by Pokker ikka's love for Mathai, Indrapalan declines to take any fees, and assures Pokker that he will get him out. Meanwhile, the newly appointed police officer Rajashekharan warns Alexander's goondas before releasing them. He was surprised to see Mathai in lock up and sets him free, warning him not to come back again. However Mathai responds that he was not sure on it. While Indrapalan reaches the police station, Mathai was already released. Mathai, Indrapalan and Rajashekharan were surprised to see each other now. The trio were college mates.

During college days, Mathai alias Mathews was busy engaged with writing poems and stories for magazines, and also searching desperately for a job, attending interviews. Rajashekharan was aiming to impress another student Rani. Indrapalan suggests Rajashekharan to impress Rani by using his talent as a singer. So, with the help of Mathews' lyrics, Rajasekharan performs a song on the college day. Rani congratulates Mathews for the wonderful lyrics and pays less attention to Rajashekharan. Mathews consoles him by telling that she needs some time to start conversing with Rajashekharan, as he is not an ordinary guy like him to her. Mathews gets a telegram at that time telling that his father is not well, and so he returns home with some financial aid (money) provided by Indrapalan and Rajashekharan. On reaching home, Mathews finds that his sister is pregnant and Alexander's son Roy, who is a flirt, is responsible for this. He takes her to Alexander's house, and suggests Roy to marry her. However Roy suggests an abortion. While Mathews gets angry at him, Alexander consoles him and asks them to return for now and asks him to come and meet him the next day to resolve the concern. But Alexander meets Mathew's sister later that day and asks her to take a medicine, which she refuses. When Alexander forces her to take that medicine, Mathews arrives there and Alexander stamps her to death. Mathews gets arrested for the murder and is sent to prison. Mathews' father also curses him for killing his sister.

Now Mathews (alias Mathai as how he is known in his locality) wants to take revenge on his sister's murderer. Rajashekharan was married to Rani, and they have a kid. Indrapalan was the official lawyer of Alexander. Now, since the three ex-collegamates have been united, Alexander plans to create a rift between them. As an initial plot, Alexander's men kidnaps Rajashekharan's sister Geetha. But she is rescued by Mathai. Indrapalan has a liking for Geetha, and he tries to get help from Rani to get this progressed. Though Mathai goes to meet Alexander to his house, he was not there. Alexanders daughter Cicily, who is a widow greets him, but he leaves.

Alexander had got Cicily married to a vigilance officer Tony, with the intention of carrying out his illegal activities smoothly. However, when Tony objects his activities and was about to catch him red-handed, Alexander shoots and kills Tony, making Cicily a widow just after their initial days of marriage.

After coming to know that Khadar has an affection for Amina, Mathai takes an upper hand to get them married. After their marriage has been fixed, Roy brutally rapes and kills Amina. Mathai, in turn kills Roy. Rajashekharan arrests Roy and confirms himself as a witness for this murder with the motive that Mathai may not commit another murder as long as he is in jail. But Indrapalan defends well to get bail for Mathai as he doesn't have the courage to see Mathai imprisoned. Pokker and Cicily stand as security for granting bail to Mathai. This makes Alexander angry and he fires at Cicily.

Vigilance visits Alexander and ask for records. They find Indrapalan's signature in most of the records, and so Alexander sets trap for Indrapalan by telling that if he stands with him, they both will be safe. Though Indrapalan was not willing to stand with Alexander, because he was trapped by Alexander, he moves out as Mathais' lawyer. This hurts everyone and they all curse him. Geetha also opts out from his life.

Its finally a twist and the movie finishes with few more murders, giving it a sad ending.

== Soundtrack ==
The music was composed by Raveendran and the lyrics were written by Poovachal Khader.

No.	Song	Singers	Lyrics	Length (m:ss)
1	"Manavaattippenne"	P. Jayachandran, Unni Menon, K. P. Brahmanandan	Poovachal Khader	
2	"Pokkerikkante Chukkukaappi" (Aaluva Chanthayilu)	Krishnachandran	Poovachal Khader	
3	"Raajeevam Vidarum Nin Mizhikal"	K. J. Yesudas	Poovachal Khader	
