= Sandhya Mayangum Neram =

- Directed by: Bharathan
- Written by: John Paul
- Produced by: Boban Kunchakko
- Starring: Bharat Gopy; Sreenath; T. G. Ravi; Jayabharathy; Philomina; Unni Mary
- Cinematography: Madhu Ambat
- Edited by: Sekhar T. R.
- Music by: Shyam
- Production company: Excel Productions
- Distributed by: Excel Film Distributors
- Release date: 9 September 1984
- Country: India
- Language: Malayalam

Sandhya Mayangum Neram (transl. When the twilight dozes) is a 1984 Indian Malayalam-language film directed by Bharathan, written by John Paul and produced Boban Kunchakko. Starring Bharat Gopy, Sreenath, T. G. Ravi, Jayabharathy, Philomina and Unni Mary. Film critic Kozhikodan included the film on his list of the 10 best Malayalam movies of all time.

== Plot ==
Bharath Gopi plays the role of a Judge, Balgangadhara Menon, who retires with his last judgement - a capital punishment to a man he once knew. He had sentenced ten people to their death, and later in the evening of his life remorse sets in and he becomes obsessed with whether he was right in hanging all those people.

The story begins with the death verdict in a court in Kerala by Balgangadhara Menon. With narrators adding passive commentary on his character of detachment and obsession, the plot is depicted with multiple frames of characteristics. He comes back from the court announcing to his children to go spread the word that dad is not going to court anymore. B. M. has three kids, two daughters and a son. His wife's sister also stays at the same house.

After the verdict, B. M. is seen troubled with himself, arguing his guilt towards announcing the death of ten men (he refers to them as breadwinners) in his private chamber circled with books and typical red shade of the court with a centrally placed judge's chair.

Eventually, you see the romance of the wife's sister Rohini with a Man named Mohan. Yashodha is seen approving, blushing and walking away from the tingling moments, whenever. On the day of B. M.'s retirement reception, he angrily speaks to the audience about how demeaning the role of a judge who has to write off ten lives is.

A psychiatrist and police friend of B. M. are seen dragging him off the stage while Yashodha breaks in hushed weeps. Afterwards, the police friend convinces B. M. to meet the psychiatrist. B. M. is seen recalling his memory of visiting one of the families of the felons he'd convicted to death. The family abuses and curses at him when he offers money for the penance. He is seen fleeing the seen after getting beaten up by the large fatherless family.

The doctor is seen counselling him and prescribing a few tablets while B. M. argues how a man wouldn't become insane after such a horrible life. The doctor contacts Yashoda and enquires about his behaviour at home. Yashoda confesses that B. M. does not have a healthy sexual appetite and it has been 7–8 years since their last congress. She narrates how he began to feel scared of people in the room since their last child and they do not sleep together anymore. Doctor suggests Yashoda to revive the sexuality in B. M. in her own ways.

Yashoda tries to approach B. M. when he is sleeping by laying next to him and caressing his forehead. B. M. wakes with a smile but instantly begins to see sudden series of flashes of the families of the people whom he killed. He then jumps off the bed and demeans the sexuality of Yashoda.

Upon reaching home, he witnesses a glimpse of the Rohini-Mohan Romance. He also notices Yashoda talking to Mohan while the latter was leaving the house. He begins to imagine Mohan and Yashoda together. After a family trip that B. M. did not attend with Yashoda, the kids, Rohini and Mohan to fix the lovebirds' marriage, B. M.'s delusions began unfolding fiercely. B. M. shares his thoughts of Yashoda's extra-marital affairs with the doctor and the psychiatrist, but both shush him up and warn him not to share it with anyone. He lashes out at Yashoda and Rohini for seducing the same person, regardless of their blood relations.

Another day, Yashoda, Rohini and the kids go for a marriage reception. Yashoda apparently hastily went off mid-way when she received a call and authorized Rohini to take the kids home. B. M. is shocked at the news when the Rohini and the kids reach home but emphasizes that he will wait for her.

In the morning, there is no Yashoda and B. M. is seen complaining how he did not sleep awaiting the call or knock on the door by Yashoda. He calls the psychiatrist and the police and they begin the investigation. They find that Mohan is also missing. Several tidbits add to the assumption that Yashoda and Mohan must have eloped and B. M. is right.

But, the police officer does not cease his investigation. In the climax, he informs B. M. that Yashoda was dropped by a Taxi in front of the house on the night of the reception. B. M. tries to join random dots to frame that Yashoda is a shrewd woman who cleverly eloped without a clue left behind. However, midway through his rant, B. M.'s brain begins to autofire and he pauses. B. M. continues with the story of how he was the one who called Yashoda to come back home on the night of the reception. He also told Yahoda to call Mohan to come home as well as her brother Ramu had come from far to meet both for her sister's marriage. When she reaches he takes her to the chamber and begins to make out using a feather and so on. Midway, he caresses Yashoda's neck and suddenly begins to strangle her.

After B. M. comes out of the chamber, Mohan is seen entering the house. B. M. invites Mohan into the chamber and kills him using the door.

Another monologue continues, B. M. where his attire is transformed into that of a man convicted for death sentence. He praises the noose across his neck and the black clothes as he believes the same emphasizes that he is truly one amongst the felons. The story is seen ending with him and the ten felons dancing in the aforementioned black robe and noose in the desert, hand-in-hand.

== Cast ==
- Bharath Gopi as Balagangadhara Menon
- Jayabharathy as Yasodha
- Sreenath as Mohan
- Unnimary as Rohini
- T. G. Ravi as Ramu
- Prathapachandran as Varma
- Sudha as Shanthi
- Raghavan as Dr. Cheriyan
- Santhakumari
- Achankunju as Poulosekutty
- Ponnambili as Sharada

== Soundtrack ==
The music was composed by Shyam and the lyrics were written by O. N. V. Kurup.

No.	Song	Singers	Lyrics	Length (m:ss)
1	"Olangalilulayum"	S. Janaki, Vani Jairam, C. O. Anto, Krishnachandran	O. N. V. Kurup	
2	"Varu Nee"	S. Janaki, Chorus	O. N. V. Kurup	
