= Sreenath =

Indian actor (1956–2010)

- Born: Sreenath Thoppil Inchora; August 26, 1956; Kuzhur, Kerala, India
- Died: 23 April 2010 (aged 53); Kothamangalam, Kerala, India
- Occupation: Actor
- Years active: 1978–2010
- Spouses: Shanthi Krishna (m. 1984; div. 1995); Latha Sreenath (m. 1999–2010)
- Children: 1
- Awards: Kerala State Television Awards

Sreenath Thoppil Inchora (26 August 1956 – 23 April 2010) was an Indian film and television actor. He was one of the prominent lead actors of the 1980s who played both lead and supporting roles in numerous Malayalam and a few Tamil films. He was noted for his good looks and was considered a handsome leading man during the early phase of his career. His first Tamil movie, Rail Payanangalil, was a super hit and ran in theatres for 175 days. Some of his notable roles as a main lead include, Ithu Njangalude Katha, Visa, Sathyam, Swapnalokum. He also played major supporting roles in Sarvakalashala, Thoovanathumbikal, Oru CBI Diary Kurippu, Kireedam, Mathilukal, and Meghamalhar.

He also acted in popular Television serials, including Samayam, Sthree Janmam, Ente Suryapthri, Ente Manasaputhri, and Paarijatham and is the recipient of Kerala State Television Awards for Best Actor in 2000.

== Personal life ==
Early in his film career, he worked with actress Shanthi Krishna in a few hit movies and fell in love during the shoot of Ithu Njangalude Katha. He later married her at Guruvayoor Temple in September 1984. They parted ways in September 1995.

He married Latha in 1999. The couple have a son named Viswajith.

== Film career ==
=== Early Career and Breakthrough (1978-1984) ===
Sreenath began his film career in the late 1970s making his debut with Shalini Ente Koottukari. He quickly rose to prominence as a leading actor and first gained attention with Kalika, where he acted as one of the leads alongside Sukumaran and Venu Nagavalli. He got his breakthrough role in Tamil cinema through the movie Rail Payanangalil directed by T.Rajendar, where he played the role of a singer. The film ran for 175 days in Tamil Nadu, and he later appeared in a few more Tamil movies. He then gained further recognition with movies like Attimari, where he was one of the main leads playing Babu, the son of veteran actor Prem Nazir, while Mohanlal, who later became a superstar, played the main antagonist. He also appeared as the main lead among five men opposite Shanthi Krishna in Ithu Njangalude Katha and the movie, along with its songs, was well received. In the movie Visa (film) he played the role of Balakrishnan, a typical Kerala youth who dreams of going abroad for a better life, a character that reflects the reality of society, where many young men aspire to improve their lives by working overseas. He was paired with Shanthi Krishna again in this film, and Mammootty, who later became a megastar, had an equally important role.

=== Supporting and Character Roles (Late 1980s – 2000s) ===
As his career progressed, Sreenath shifted to playing supporting and character roles. He was noted for his performances in Thoovanathumbikal and Mathilukal, as well as for portraying Omana’s husband, Sunny, in Oru CBI Diary Kurippu, which ran for more than 100 days. He also played Mohanlal’s (Sethu’s) friend in Kireedam, In the new millennium, he delivered a remarkable performance as advocate Bhoominathan in Meghamalhar, a role that required maturity and was executed with sheer excellence. In addition to films, he focused on television acting, while continuing to appear occasionally in movies. He also completed a two-year acting program at the South Indian Film Chambers.

Some of his other popular films include, Mangalam Nerunnu, Sandhya Mayangum Neram, Itha Innu Muthal, Kaalapani, Devaasuram, Vazhunnor, Agnisakshi, and Varnakkazhchakal. Sreenath played an important role in the segment 'Makal' of the 2009 anthology Kerala Cafe, which consisted of 10 short films woven around a common theme. This was his last film.

== Political career ==
Sreenath was a Shiv Sena candidate from the Attingal Lok Sabha constituency in the 2009 Lok Sabha elections.

== Death ==
Sreenath was found dead with his wrists slashed in a hotel room in Kothamangalam in Kerala on 23 April 2010. He had been in Kothamangalam for the shooting of the Malayalam film Shikar. His body was later shifted to Thiruvananthapuram and cremated at Shanthikavadam Crematorium with full state honour. His family suspected that he was murdered. The mystery about his death remains to this day.

== Accolades ==
Year	Award	Category	Work	Result	Ref
2000	Kerala State Television Awards	Best Actor		Won	

== Filmography ==
=== Malayalam ===
Year	Title	Role	Notes
1978	Shalini Ente Koottukari	Unnikrishnan	
1979	Manasa Vacha Karmana	Rameshan's friend	
1980	Sathyam	Ramakrishna Nair	
1980	Kalika	Kariya	
1981	Arayannam	Vijayan	
1981	Attimari	Babu	
1981	Thaalam Manasinte Thaalam		
1981	Oothikachiya Ponnu	Dr. Samuel	
1982	Pooviriyum Pulari	Raghu	
1982	Ithu Njangalude Katha	Raghu	
1982	Chilanthivala	Suresh	
1983	Swapnalokum		
1983	Visa	Balakrishnan	
1983	Eenam		
1983	Kingini Kombu		
1983	Professor Janaki		
1983	Belt Mathai	Tony	
1983	Saagaram Santham	Dr. Madan Mohan	
1984	NH 47	Sunny	
1984	Thacholi Thankappan	Basheer	
1984	Mangalam Nerunnu	Madhu	
1984	Sandhya Mayangum Neram	Mohan	
1984	Piriyilla Naam	Gopi	
1984	Itha Innu Muthal	Gopi/Jimmy Fernandez	
1984	Muthodu Muthu	Gopi	
1984	Odaruthammava Aalariyam	Govindan	
1985	Parayanumvayya Parayathirikkanumvayya	Police Officer	
1985	Snehicha Kuttathinu	Satheesh Chandran	
1985	Aarodum Parayaruthu		
1985	Oru Nokku Kanan		
1985	Ayanam	Joy	
1985	Koodum Thedi	Jayakumar	
1986	Oru Yugasandhya	Karunan	
1986	Hello My Dear Wrong Number	SI Rajagopal	
1986	Bhagavan		
1986	Vivahithare Ithile		
1987	Archanapookkal		
1987	Nirabedhangal	Balan	
1987	Amme Bhagavathi	Thirumeni	
1987	Vrutham	James Chacko	
1987	Sarvakalashala	Jeevan	
1987	Jaalakam	Anchal Sasi	
1987	Thoovanathumbikal	Madhavan	
1987	Irupatham Noottandu	Jeevan	
1987	Kaiyethum Doorathu	Murali	
1987	Ezhuthapurangal	Sreenivasan	
1988	Moonnam Mura	DySP Raju	
1988	Marikkunnila Njan		
1988	Kudumbapuranam	Sivan	
1988	Oru CBI Diary Kurippu	Sunny	
1988	Innaleyude Baakki	Balu	
1988	Vicharana	Raghuvaran	
1988	August 1	Gopi	
1989	Swagatham	Sajan	
1989	Innale	Gafoor	
1989	Douthyam	Shekhar	
1989	Aazhikkoru Muthu	Chandran	
1989	V. I. P.	Rajendran	
1989	The News	Jeevan	
1989	Kireedam	Keshu	
1989	Adikkurippu	S. I. Raju	
1990	Enquiry		
1990	Naale Ennundengil		
1990	Mathilukal	Aniyan	
1992	Apaaratha	Sudhakaran	
1992	Malootty	Raghavan	
1993	Ottayadipathakal	Anoop	
1993	Sabarimalayil Thanka Sooriyodayam		
1993	Chenkol	Keshu	
1993	Devaasuram	C. S.	
1995	Achan Kombathu Amma Varampathu	Balan	
1995	Bali		
1995	Saadaram	Ravichandra Menon	
1995	Maanthrikam	Kernel	
1996	Thooval Kottaram	Mathew	
1996	Kaalapani	Satyasheelan, a prisoner	
1999	Vazhunnor	Adv. Simon Thevakkattu	
1999	Agnisakshi		
2000	Varnakkazhchakal	Adv. Satheesh	
2001	Meghamalhar	Bhoominathan	
2003	Vasanthamallika	Balakrishnan's father	
2004	Sethurama Iyer CBI	Sunny	
2006	Balram vs. Tharadas	Jayakrishnan	
2007	Sketch		
2007	The Trigger		
2009	Bhagavan		
2009	Kerala Cafe	Sajeevan	Segment: "Makal"

=== Tamil ===
Year	Title	Role	Notes
1981	Rail Payanangalil	N. Vasanth	
1981	Chinna Mul Peria Mul	Dr. Arun	
1983	Kal Vadiyum Pookkal		
1987	Poovizhi Vasalile	Micheal	Guest appearance

== Television serials ==
=== Malayalam ===
- Samayam (Asianet)
- Ragamritham (DD Malayalam)
- Snehadooram (Asianet)
- Sthree Janmam (Surya Tv)
- Kadamathath Kathanaar (Asianet)
- Kanakkuyil (Asianet)
- Suryaputhri (Asianet)
- Ente Suryaputhri (Surya Tv)
- Ente Manasaputhri (Asianet)
- Hello Kuttichathan (Asianet)
- Paarijatham (Asianet)
- Akkare Ikkare (Asianet)
- Nirmalyam (Asianet)
- Police (ACV)
- Mattoruval (Surya Tv)
- Devimahathmyam (Asianet)

=== Tamil ===
- Ammavukku Kalyanam (DD)
- Maharani (TV series) (Vijay TV)
