= Kingini Kombu =

- Directed by: Jayan Adiyattu
- Written by: K. P. Jayan
- Screenplay by: K. P. Jayan
- Starring: Jagathy Sreekumar; Nedumudi Venu; Jalaja; Sreenath
- Edited by: Sasikumar
- Music by: Raveendran
- Production company: Poornima Films
- Distributed by: Poornima Films
- Release date: 23 September 1983
- Country: India
- Language: Malayalam

Kingini Kombu is a 1983 Indian Malayalam film, directed by Jayan Adiyattu. The film stars Jagathy Sreekumar, Nedumudi Venu, Jalaja and Sreenath in the lead roles. The film has musical score by Raveendran.

== Cast ==
- Jagathy Sreekumar
- Nedumudi Venu
- Jalaja
- Sreenath
- Vandana

== Soundtrack ==
The music was composed by Raveendran and the lyrics were written by Mullanezhi.

No.	Song	Singers	Lyrics	Length (m:ss)
1	"Oru Mala Iru Mala"	K. J. Yesudas	Mullanezhi	
2	"Pon Kinaavinu"	S. Janaki, K. P. Brahmanandan	Mullanezhi	
3	"Poonilaavin Alakalil"	S. Janaki	Mullanezhi	
4	"Yamunatheeravihaari"	K. J. Yesudas	Mullanezhi	
