= Himavaahini =

Himavahini
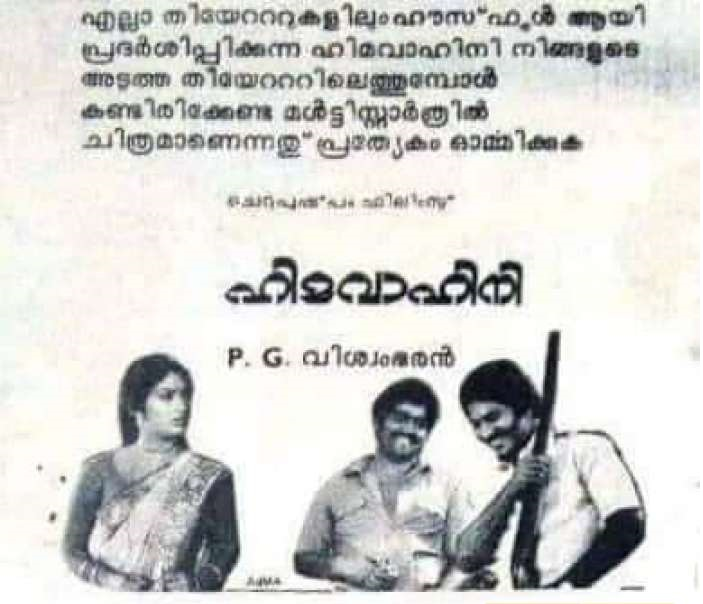
- Directed by: P. G. Vishwambharan
- Written by: Thoppil Bhasi
- Screenplay by: Thoppil Bhasi
- Produced by: K. J. Joseph
- Starring: Mammootty; Mohanlal; Jagathy Sreekumar; Adoor Bhasi
- Cinematography: C. E. Babu
- Music by: G. Devarajan
- Production company: Cherupushpam Films
- Distributed by: Cherupushpam Films
- Release date: 4 March 1983
- Country: India
- Language: Malayalam

Himavahini is a 1983 Indian Malayalam-language film, directed by P. G. Vishwambharan and produced by K. J. Joseph. The film stars Mammootty, Mohanlal, Jagathy Sreekumar and Adoor Bhasi. The film has musical score by G. Devarajan.

== Cast ==
- Mammootty as Gopi
- Mohanlal as Pappi
- Jagathy Sreekumar as Hamsa
- Adoor Bhasi as Watcher
- Ratheesh as Sekharan
- Kalaranjini as Ponnamma
- Prathapachandran as Hema's father
- Achankunju as Panthalam Kurup
- Shanthi Krishna as Hema
- Thodupuzha Vasanthy as Hema's sister
- Ranipadmini as Sainaba

== Soundtrack ==
The music was composed by G. Devarajan and the lyrics were written by Poovachal Khader.

No.	Song	Singers	Lyrics	Length (m:ss)
1	"Ennum Puthiya Pookkal"	P. Madhuri, K. P. Brahmanandan	Poovachal Khader	
2	"Mohasangama Raathri"	K. J. Yesudas	Poovachal Khader	
3	"Vanabhangiyil"	K. J. Yesudas	Poovachal Khader	
