= Maniyara =

- Directed by: M. Krishnan Nair
- Produced by: T. E. Vasudevan
- Starring: Mammootty; Seema; Adoor Bhasi; Shanthi Krishna
- Music by: A. T. Ummer
- Production company: Jaijaya Combines
- Distributed by: Chalachitra
- Release date: 11 November 1983
- Country: India
- Language: Malayalam

Maniyara is a 1983 Indian Malayalam film, written by Moidu Padiyath, directed by M. Krishnan Nair and produced by T. E. Vasudevan. The film stars Mammootty, Seema, Adoor Bhasi and Shanthi Krishna in the lead roles. The film has musical score by A. T. Ummer.

== Cast ==
- Mammootty as Shameer
- Seema as Noorjahan
- Adoor Bhasi as Shameer's father
- Shubha as Shameer's mother
- Sathyakala as Sheeja (Shameer's cousin)
- Balan K. Nair as Noorjahan's father
- Shanthi Krishna as Sapna
- Shanavas as Ayyoob
- Azeez
- Sankaradi as Sulaiman
- Mala Aravindan
- Bahadoor

== Plot ==
Noorjahan is married to Shameer, against Shameer's mother's will. This makes Noorjahan's life at his home difficult. Shameer's mother wanted to get Shameer married to her brother's daughter Sheeja and makes use of Noorjahan's abortion to distance Shameer and Noorjahan. Shameer was convinced to marry Sheeja stating that Noorjahan won't be able to conceive again. On Shameer's day of marriage to Sheeja, Noorjahan loses consciousness and doctor finds out that she's pregnant. This news is conveyed to Shameer and he comes to Noorjahan calling off the marriage. But he finds a lifeless Noorjahan and he realizes that it was his mother who manipulated the situation and he loses his sanity at the end

== Soundtrack ==
The music was composed by A. T. Ummer and the lyrics were written by P. Bhaskaran.

No.	Song	Singers	Lyrics	Length (m:ss)
1	"Kwaja Sheikhin Maqbaraa"	K. J. Yesudas, Jolly Abraham	P. Bhaskaran	
2	"Mizhiyina Njaanadaykkumpol"	K. J. Yesudas, Ambili	P. Bhaskaran	
3	"Ninavinte Kaayalil"	K. J. Yesudas, Ambili	P. Bhaskaran	
4	"Penne Manavaatti"	K. J. Yesudas, Vani Jairam	P. Bhaskaran	
5	"Viphalam"	S. Janaki, Chorus	P. Bhaskaran	
