= Eenam =

- Directed by: Bharathan
- Screenplay by: Padmarajan
- Produced by: M. O. Joseph
- Starring: Venu Nagavally; Shanthi Krishna; Adoor Bhasi; Bharath Gopi
- Cinematography: Madhu Ambat
- Edited by: M. S. Mani
- Music by: Songs: Bharathan; Background Score: Ouseppachan
- Production company: Manjilas
- Distributed by: Chalachitra
- Release date: 2 December 1983
- Country: India
- Language: Malayalam

Eenam is a 1983 Indian Malayalam film, directed by Bharathan and produced by M. O. Joseph. The film stars Venu Nagavally, Shanthi Krishna, Adoor Bhasi and Bharath Gopi in the lead roles. The film has musical score by Ouseppachan and original songs composed by director Bharathan himself.

== Cast ==
- Venu Nagavally
- Shanthi Krishna
- Adoor Bhasi
- Bharath Gopi
- Unnimary
- Sreenath

== Soundtrack ==
The original songs featured in the film were composed by Bharathan and the lyrics were written by Venu Nagavally and Bharathan. Ouseppachan composed the background score of the film.

No.	Song	Singers	Lyrics	Length (m:ss)
1	"Ambaadikkutta"	Vani Jairam	Venu Nagavally	
2	"Maaleya Lepanam"	Vani Jairam, K. P. Brahmanandan	Bharathan	
