= Oomana Thinkal =

- Directed by: Yatheendra Das
- Written by: Yatheendra Das
- Screenplay by: Vel A. P.
- Produced by: Kora George
- Starring: Kaviyoor Ponnamma; Venu Nagavally; Baby Anju; Babu Namboothiri
- Cinematography: Vipin Mohan
- Edited by: N. P. Suresh
- Music by: M. B. Sreenivasan
- Production company: SMV Arts
- Distributed by: SMV Arts
- Release date: 16 September 1983
- Country: India
- Language: Malayalam

Oomana Thinkal (transl. Beloved Crescent Moon) is a 1983 Indian Malayalam-language film, directed by Yatheendra Das and produced by Kora George. The film stars Kaviyoor Ponnamma, Venu Nagavally, Baby Anju and Babu Namboothiri in the lead roles. The film has musical score by M. B. Sreenivasan.

== Cast ==
- Kaviyoor Ponnamma
- Venu Nagavally
- Baby Anju
- Babu Namboothiri
- Balan K. Nair
- Shanthi Krishna

== Soundtrack ==
The music was composed by M. B. Sreenivasan with lyrics by Bichu Thirumala.

No.	Song	Singers	Lyrics	Length (m:ss)
1	"Amma Ammamma"	S. Janaki	Bichu Thirumala	
2	"Olanjalikkiliuyde"	K. J. Yesudas	Bichu Thirumala	
3	"Olanjalikkiliuyde"	S. Janaki	Bichu Thirumala	
4	"Yavana Puraana Naayakan"	K. J. Yesudas	Bichu Thirumala	
