= Shobha Warrier =

Indian journalist and author

Shobha Warrier is an Indian journalist and author based in Chennai. She began her career as a creative writer, publishing a number of short stories in Malayalam: Ramakundam, Meghana, and Jalavidya.

In 1996, she was awarded the Lalithambika Sahitya Award (named after the author and social reformer Lalithambika Antharjanam) for her short story Jalavidya, which was later translated to Kannada and Telugu. Warrier later pursued a career in journalism at the encouragement of her friends. Currently, she is the associate editorial director of the entertainment website Rediff.com.

== Writing career ==
Warrier has authored four books, all of which were published by Vitasta Publishing. The first is The Diary of A Journalist: The Little Flower Girl and Others (2013), an anthological book containing 36 stories about her meeting with several people during her journalistic career. The idea of the book first took shape while she was visiting an ashram for children with HIV.

She next wrote His Days with Bapu Gandhi's Personal Secretary Recalls (2016), chronicling the life of Mahatma Gandhi. Dreamchasers: Entrepreneurs from the South of the Vindhyas came as her third book and was released in 2017. Dreamchasers: Women Entrepreneurs from the South of the Vindhyas (2018) is her fourth book and profiles 14 women entrepreneurs. Warrier started working on this book in 1997 after she met Professor Ashok Jhunjhunwala. She told a Hindu interviewer, "I was drawn to it because of Jhunjhunwala. He had an incubation centre at Indian Institute of Technology Madras long before we started using terms like startup. When I interviewed him, he spoke about the centre and wanted me to meet a few entrepreneurs."

== Bibliography ==
- Warrier, Shobha (1 August 2013). The Diary of A Journalist: The Little Flower Girl and Others. Vitasta Publishing. ISBN 978-81-92535-42-5.
- Warrier, Shobha (1 January 2016). His Days With Bapu: Gandhi's Personal Secretary Recalls. Vitasta Publishing. ISBN 978-93-82711-87-2.
- Warrier, Shobha (1 January 2017). Dreamchasers: Entrepreneurs from the South of the Vindhyas. Vitasta Publishing. ISBN 978-93-82711-61-2.
- Warrier, Shobha (5 September 2018). Dreamchasers: Women Entrepreneurs from the South of the Vindhyas. Vitasta Publishing. ISBN 978-93-864733-4-9.
