= Saagaram Santham =

- Directed by: P. G. Vishwambharan
- Written by: Sarah Thomas; John Paul (dialogues)
- Screenplay by: John Paul
- Produced by: P. G. Vishwambharan
- Starring: Mammootty; Nedumudi Venu; Shanthi Krishna
- Cinematography: Ramachandra Babu
- Edited by: G. Venkittaraman
- Music by: M. B. Sreenivasan
- Production company: Prem Devas Films
- Distributed by: Prem Devas Films
- Release date: 7 October 1983
- Country: India
- Language: Malayalam

Saagaram Santham (transl. The ocean is calm) is a 1983 Indian Malayalam-language film, directed and produced by P. G. Vishwambharan. The film stars Mammootty, Nedumudi Venu and Shanthi Krishna and features a musical score by M. B. Sreenivasan.

== Cast ==
- Mammootty as Anathan
- Shanthi Krishna as Sreedevi
- Nedumudi Venu as Raghavan
- Sukumari as Marathakam
- Sreenath as Dr. Madan Mohan
- Ramu as Sreedevi's brother
- Sathyakala as Unknown
- Achankunju
- Usilai Mani

== Soundtrack ==
The music was composed by M. B. Sreenivasan and the lyrics were written by O. N. V. Kurup.

No.	Song	Singers	Length (m:ss)
1	"Elam Pookkum Kaalam Vannu"	S. Janaki, P. Jayachandran	
2	"Maanikya Mathilakathe"	K. J. Yesudas, Chorus	
3	"Malarthinkalenthe"	K. J. Yesudas	
