= Shanthi Krishna =

Indian actress

- Occupation: Actress
- Years active: 1980–1986; 1991–1998; 2017–present
- Spouses: Sreenath (m. 1984; div. 1995); Sadasivan Bajore (m. 1998; div. 2016)
- Children: 2
- Relatives: Suresh Krissna (brother)

Shanthi Krishna is an Indian actress known for her leading roles in Malayalam and Tamil films. As a star in the 1980s and 1990s, she won many accolades including the Kerala State Film Award for Best Actress for her performance as Sharadammini in Chakoram (1994). She also won the Kerala State Television Award for Best Actress three times in a row, as well as the Filmfare Award for Best Supporting Actress – Malayalam for her performance in Njandukalude Nattil Oridavela, her comeback film.

== Early life ==
Her parents are R. Krishna and K. Sharada, a Palakkad Iyer family based in Bombay. She completed her education at Mumbai S.I.E.S. College and General Education Academy. Her three brothers are Sreeram, Satheesh and film director Suresh Krissna.

The same year, she acted in her first Tamil film, Paneer Pushpangal. She quit the film industry after her first marriage, but made a comeback in 1991 in the movie Nayam Vyakthamakkunnu. She won the Kerala State Film Award for Best Actress for her performance in Chakoram (1994). In 1997 she stopped appearing in Malayalam movies. She served as a jury member in Malayalam film awards. She made a second comeback in 2017 with the movie Njandukalude Nattil Oridavela.

== Personal life ==
Shanthi Krishna married Malayalam actor Sreenath in 1984 and divorced him in 1995. In 1998, she married Sadasivan Bajore, the secretary of Rajiv Gandhi Group of Institutions. They have two children, Mithul and Mithali. The couple divorced in 2016. She lived in the US for a while and later returned to Bengaluru.

== Awards ==
Kerala State Film Awards

- 1992 - Second Best Actress - Savidham
- 1994 - Best Actress - Chakoram

Kerala State Television Awards

- 1992 - Best Actress - Mohapakshikal
- 1994 - Best Actress - Seemanthan
- 1995 - Best Actress - Scooter

Filmfare Awards South

- 2018 - Best Supporting Actress – Malayalam -Njandukalude Nattil Oridavela

Other Awards

- 2017 - Asiavision Awards for Best supporting actress - Njandukalude Nattil Oridavela
- 2018 - Vanitha Film Awards for Best supporting actress - Njandukalude Nattil Oridavela
- 2018 - Flowers Indian film Awards 2018 - Best Supporting actress - Njandukalude Nattil Oridavela
- 2018 - Asianet Film Awards - Best Character Actress - Njandukalude Nattil Oridavela
- 2018 - Jaycee foundation Awards 2018 - Best Supporting actress - Njandukalude Nattil Oridavela
- 2018 - NAFA awards USA - Best supporting actress- Njandugalude Nattil Oridavela

== Filmography ==
- All films are in Malayalam, unless otherwise noted.

Year	Title	Role	Notes
1980	Panneer Pookaley		Tamil film
1980	Taalam Oru Lokam		Tamil film
1981	Nidra	Aswathy	
1981	Tharattu	Meera	
1981	Sivappu Malli	Mallika	Tamil film
1981	Chinna Mul Peria Mul	Radha	Tamil film
1981	Panneer Pushpangal	Uma	Tamil film
1982	Kelkatha Shabdam	Sushama	
1982	Ithu Njangalude Katha	Prabha	
1982	Kilukilukkam	Anjali	
1982	Idiyum Minnalum		
1982	Manal Kayiru	Uma	Tamil film
1982	Simla Special	Uma	Tamil film
1982	Chillu	Annie	
1983	Visa	Nalini	
1983	Eenam	Subhadra	
1983	Swapnalokum		
1983	Omanathinkal	Ajitha/Gopi's wife	
1983	Sagaram Santham	Sreedevi	
1983	Himavahini	Hema	
1983	Maniyara	Sabna	
1983	Prem Nazirine Kanmanilla	Herself	
1984	Anbulla Malare		Tamil film
1984	Mangalam Nerunnu	Usha	
1985	Hemavin Kadhalargal		Tamil film
1986	Nimishangal	Anitha	
1991	Ennum Nanmakal	Radha Devi	
1991	Achan Pattalam	Ashok's mother	
1991	Vishnulokam	Savithri	
1991	Nayam Vyakthamakkunnu	Valsala	
1992	Savidham	Sudha Thampuratti	
1992	Pandu Pandoru Rajakumari	Devayani	
1992	Kauravar	Ramani	
1992	Aparatha	Soumini	
1992	Sabarimalayil Thanka Sooryodayam	Radhika	
1992	Mahanagaram	Geetha	
1993	Gandharvam	Lakshmi	
1993	Mayamayooram	Dr. Vimala	
1993	Johnny	Margaret	
1993	Chenkol	Jose's wife	
1993	Aalavattam	Urmila	
1994	Dhadha	Devi	
1994	Varanamaalyam	Vasundara	
1994	Parinayam	Maathu	
1994	Pingami	Vijay Menon's Mother	
1994	Pakshe	Rajeswari	
1994	Kudumba Visesham	Aswathy	
1994	Ilayum Mullum	Parvathy	
1994	Chakoram	Shardamani	
1995	Sukrutham	Durga	
1995	Avittam Thirunaal Aarogya Sriman	Hemalatha	
1995	Thakshashila	Ganga	
1996	April 19	Zeenath	
1996	Laalanam	Saleena	
1997	Nerrukku Ner	Shanthi	Tamil film
1997	Kalyana Unnikal	Raziya	
1997	Laali	Shanthi Krishna	Kannada film
1998	Priyuralu	Subhadra	Telugu film; dubbed in Malayalam as Manjeeradhwani
2012	Lumiere Brothers	Herself	Archive footage
2012	Karppooradeepam	Sheela	
2017	Njandukalude Nattil Oridavela	Sheela Chacko	
2018	Kuttanadan Marpappa	Mary	Also playback singer
2018	Aravindante Athidhikal	Geethalakshmi	Cameo Appearance
2018	Mazhayathu	Anamika (Principal)	
2018	Krishnam	Meera	Bilingual film
2018	Mangalyam Thanthunanena	Thresiamma	Also playback singer
2018	Ente Ummante Peru	Ramlath	
2019	Vijay Superum Pournamiyum	Radhamani	
2019	Mikhael	Ancy	
2019	Lonappante Mammodheesa	Valyechi	
2019	Athiran	Lakshmi	
2019	Mangalath Vasundhara	Mangalath Vasundhara	
2019	Vakathirivu	Sathi teacher	
2019	Subharathri	Khadeeja	
2019	Margamkali	Chandrika	
2019	Ulta	Savithri	
2020	Shyamaragam	Bhagyalakshmi	
2021	Thirike	Fathima	
2022	Gold	Subhadra	
2023	Nila	Malathi	
2023	Pachuvum Athbutha Vilakkum	Anitha	
2023	Section 306 IPC	Advocate	
2023	King of Kotha	Malathi	
2023	Achan Oru Vaazha Vechu	Krishna Priya	
2023	Masterpeace	Lisamma	Disney+ Hotstar Web series
2023	Inheritance		
2023	Ethire		
2023	Vellaram Kunnile Velli Meenukal	Annaammachi	
2024	Paalum Pazhavum	Sumithra	
2024	Manorathangal	Malu amma	ZEE5 Anthology Television Series Segment: Silalikhitham
2025	Machante Maalakha	Kunjumol	
2025	Vala: Story of a Bangle	Pathoocha	

== Television ==
- All TV shows and soaps are in Malayalam, unless otherwise noted.

Year	Title	Channel	Role	Notes
1990	Chitrageetham	DD Malayalam	Host	
1992	Chapalyam	DD Malayalam		
1993	Ammayi	DD Malayalam		Telefilm
1994	Scooter	DD Malayalam	Swayamprabha	
1999	Seemantham	DD Malayalam	Swayamprabha	
2000	Kuthirakal	DD Malayalam		
2001	Paliyathachan	DD Malayalam		
2002	Mohapakshikal	DD Malayalam		
2014	JB Junction	Kairali TV	Guest	
2017	Malayali Veettamma	Flowers TV	Judge	
2017	Onnum Onnum Moonu	Flowers TV	Guest	
2018	Comedy Utsavam	Flowers TV	Guest	
2019	Comedy stars season 2	Asianet	Judge	
2021	Kaliveedu	Surya TV	Herself	
2022	MY G Flowers Oru Kodi	Flowers TV	Participant	
2023	Oru Chiri Iru Chiri Bumper Chiri	Mazhavil Manorama	Judge	
2024	Geeta Govindam	Asianet	Herself	Cameo
2025–2026	Othiri Othiri Swapnangal	Mazhavil Manorama	Vasundhara	
2025	Amme Mookambike	Surya TV	Vasundhara Devi	Cameo
