= P. K. Joseph =

Indian film director

- Born: Karuvatta
- Occupation: Film director
- Years active: 1979–1990
- Spouse: Treesa Joseph
- Children: Nancy Joseph, Rincy Joseph
- Parent(s): Patterethu Padeettathil Kunjachan, Thankamma

Padeettathil Kunjachan Joseph was an Indian film director in Malayalam movies. He had directed 16 Malayalam movies. He died in 1990.

== Filmography ==
=== Direction ===
- Kallu Kaarthyaayani (1979)
- Sukhathinte Pinnale (1979)
- Pennorumbettaal (1979)
- Makaravilakku (1980)
- Oothikkaachiya Ponnu (1981)
- Kayam (1982)
- Ente Kadha (1983)
- Kaathirunna Divasam (1983)
- Oru Mukham Pala Mukham (1983)
- Manassoru Mahaasamudram (1983)
- Oru Thettinte Katha - (1984)
- Kooduthedunna Parava (1984)
- Snehicha Kuttathinu (1985)
- Mulamoottil Adima (1985)
- Vida Parayaan Maathram (1988)
- Rahasyam Paramarahasyam (1988)

=== Story ===
- Sukhathinte Pinnale (1979)
- Pennorumbettaal (1979)
- Kooduthedunna Parava (1984)

=== Dialogue ===
- Pennorumbettaal (1979)
- Kooduthedunna Parava (1984)

=== Screenplay ===
- Kallu Kaarthyaayani (1979)
- Sukhathinte Pinnale (1979)

=== Acting ===
- Chandrakaantham (1974)
