= List of Malayalam films of 1976 =

The following is a list of Malayalam films released in 1976.

Opening		Sl. No.	Film	Cast	Director	Music director	Notes
J A N	9	1	Agni Pushpam	Jayabharathi, Kamalahasan	Jeassy	M. K. Arjunan	
J A N	16	2	Priyamvada	Mohan Sharma, Lakshmi, KPAC Lalitha	K. S. Sethumadhavan	V. Dakshinamoorthy	
J A N	23	3	Yakshagaanam	Madhu, Sheela	Sheela	M. S. Viswanathan	
J A N	30	4	Paalkkadal	Sheela, Sharada	T. K. Prasad	A. T. Ummer	
F E B	5	5	Amma	Madhu, Srividya	M. Krishnan Nair	M. K. Arjunan	
F E B	13	6	Appooppan	Thikkurissy Sukumaran Nair, Kamal Haasan	P. Bhaskaran	M. S. Baburaj	
F E B	20	7	Srishti	Chowalloor Krishnankutty, Ravi Alummoodu	K. T. Muhammad	M. S. Baburaj	
F E B	20	8	Vanadevatha	Prem Nazir, Madhubala	Yusufali Kechery	G. Devarajan	
F E B	27	9	Samasya	Madhu, Kamalahaasan	K. Thankappan	Shyam	
F E B	27	10	Yudhabhoomi	K. P. Ummer, Vidhubala	Crossbelt Mani	R. K. Shekhar	
M A R	5	11	Seemantha Puthran	Prem Nazir, Jayabharathi	A. B. Raj	M. K. Arjunan	
M A R	12	12	Swapnadanam	Rani Chandra, Dr. Mohandas	K. G. George	Bhaskar Chandavarkar	
M A R	19	13	Thulavarsham	Prem Nazir, sreedevi, Sudheer	N. Sankaran Nair	V. Dakshinamoorthy	
M A R	20	14	Aruthu	Kaviyoor Ponnamma, Kamalahasan	Ravi	G. Devarajan	
M A R	26	15	Swimming Pool	Kamal Haasan, M. G. Soman	J. Sasikumar	M. K. Arjunan	
A P R	1	16	Prasaadam	Prem Nazir, Jayabharathi	A. B. Raj	V. Dakshinamoorthy	
A P R	9	17	Kaayamkulam Kochunniyude Makan	Prem Nazir, Jayabharathi	J. Sasikumar	M. K. Arjunan	
A P R	14	18	Chennaaya Valarthiya Kutty	Prem Nazir, Sharada	Kunchacko	M. K. Arjunan	
A P R	14	19	Theekkanal	Madhu, Srividya	Madhu	K. J. Yesudas	
A P R	30	20	Anaavaranam	M. Chandran Nair, Sathar	A. Vincent	G. Devarajan	
A P R	30	21	Chirikkudukka	Prem Nazir, Vidhubala	A. B. Raj	Shankar–Ganesh	
M A Y	6	22	Udyaanalakshmi	Sudheer, Hari, Rani Chandra	K. S. Gopalakrishnan	G. Devarajan	
M A Y	14	23	Pushpasharam	Prem Nazir, Jayabharathi	J. Sasikumar	M. S. Baburaj	
M A Y	21	24	Ozhukkinethire	Prem Nazir, Jayabharathi	P. G. Vishwambharan	M. K. Arjunan	
M A Y	22	25	Sexilla Stundilla	Jayabharathi, Vincent	B. N. Prakash	V. Dakshinamoorthy	
M A Y	28	26	Njavalppazhangal	Mohan Sharma, Vidhubala	P. M. A. Azeez	Shyam	
J U N	4	27	Sindooram	Jayabharathi, Vincent	Jeassy	A. T. Ummer	
J U N	10	28	Anubhavam	Sheela, K. P. Ummer	I. V. Sasi	A. T. Ummer	
J U N	24	29	Panchami	Prem Nazir, Jayan	Hariharan	M. S. Viswanathan	
J U L	2	30	Surveykkallu	KPAC Lalitha, Lakshmi	Thoppil Bhasi	G. Devarajan	
J U L	9	31	Kuttavum Sikshayum	Kamal Haasan, Sridevi	M. Masthan	M. S. Viswanathan	
J U L	16	32	Kabani Nadi Chuvannappol	T. V. Chandran, Salam Karassery	P. A. Backer	Devarajan	
J U L	23	33	Lakshmi Vijayam	Sukumaran, Kamalahaasan, Alummodan	K. P. Kumaran	Shyam	
J U L	30	34	Romeo	Sheela, Kaviyoor Ponnamma	S. S. Nair	G. Devarajan	
A U G	6	35	Chottanikkara Amma	Srividya, Kaviyoor Ponnamma	Crossbelt Mani	R. K. Shekhar	
A U G	6	36	Vazhivilakku	Prem Nazir, Sukumari	Vijay	V. Dakshinamoorthy	
A U G	12	37	Kanyaadaanam	Prem Nazir, Madhu	Hariharan	M. K. Arjunan	
A U G	20	38	Raathriyile Yaathrakkaar	Jayabharathi, Adoor Bhasi	P. Venu	G. Devarajan	
A U G	27	39	Aayiram Janmangal	Prem Nazir, K. R. Vijaya	P. N. Sundaram	M. S. Viswanathan	
S E P	3	40	Mallanum Mathevanum	Prem Nazir, Sheela	Kunchacko	K. Raghavan	
S E P	3	41	Ponni	Kamal Haasan, Soman, Lakshmi	Thoppil Bhasi	G. Devarajan	
S E P	4	42	Amba Ambika Ambalika	Srividya, Kaviyoor Ponnamma	P. Subramaniam	G. Devarajan	
S E P	17	43	Light House	Prem Nazir, Jayan	A. B. Raj	M. K. Arjunan	
S E P	17	43	Kenalum Collectorum	Vincent, Rani Chandra	M. M. Nesan	G. Devarajan	
S E P	24	44	Ayalkkaari	Jayabharathi, Vincent	I. V. Sasi	G. Devarajan	
S E P	24	45	Nee Ente Lahari	Jayabharathi, Jose Prakash	P. G. Vishwambharan	G. Devarajan	
O C T	1	46	Rajaankanam	Sheela, M. G. Soman	Jeassy	M. K. Arjunan	
O C T	2	47	Ammini Ammaavan	Prem Nazir, Jayabharathi	Hariharan	G. Devarajan	
O C T	7	48	Madhuram Thirumadhuram	KPAC Lalitha, Raghavan	Dr. Balakrishnan	A. T. Ummer	
O C T	15	49	Maanasaveena	Madhu, Jayabharathi	Babu Nanthankodu	M. L. Srikanth	
O C T	22	50	Mohiniyaattam	Adoor Bhasi, Lakshmi	Sreekumaran Thampi	G. Devarajan	
O C T	29	51	Pick Pocket	Prem Nazir, Jayan	J. Sasikumar	M. K. Arjunan	
N O V	5	52	Neela Sari	Adoor Bhasi, Jose Prakash	M. Krishnan Nair	V. Dakshinamoorthy	
N O V	12	53	Missi	K. P. Ummer, Lakshmi, Mohan Sharma	Thoppil Bhasi	G. Devarajan	
N O V	12	54	Themmadi Velappan	Prem Nazir, Madhu	Hariharan	M. S. Viswanathan	
N O V	19	55	Muthu	Madhu, Adoor Bhasi	N. N. Pisharady	Pradeep Singh	
N O V	20	56	Kaadaaru Maasam	Sadhana, Vincent	Dr. Balakrishnan	B. A. Chidambaranath	
N O V	26	57	Aalinganam	Sridevi, Raghavan	I. V. Sasi	A. T. Ummer	
D E C	2	58	Abhinandanam	Jayabharathi, K. P. Ummer	I. V. Sasi	Kannur Rajan	
D E C	2	59	Paarijatham	Prem Nazir, Kaviyoor Ponnamma	Mansoor	M. K. Arjunan	
D E C	3	60	Kamadhenu	Prem Nazir, Jayan	J. Sasikumar	Shankar–Ganesh	
D E C	23	61	Amrithavaahini	Prem Nazir, Thikkurisi Sukumaran Nair	J. Sasikumar	A. T. Ummer	
D E C	24	62	Ajayanum Vijayanum	Prem Nazir, Lakshmi, Sukumari	J. Sasikumar	M. S. Viswanathan	
D E C	24	63	Hridayam Oru Kshethram	Madhu, Srividya	P. Subramaniam	G. Devarajan	
D E C	24	64	Rajayogam	Prem Nazir, Jayabharathi	Hariharan	M. S. Viswanathan	

== Dubbed films ==
Movie	Direction	Actors	Music	Lyrics
Seetha Swayamvaram	Bapu	Ravikumar, Jaya Prada	K. V. Mahadevan	
Kollakkaran	P. Sivaram	Rajkumar		
Bandhangal Bandhanangal	Mallikarjuna Rao			
Kallanum Kullanum	K. S. R. Das	Vishnuvardhan		
Raja Mayoora Varma	Vijay	Rajkumar		
Kenalum Collectorum	M. M. Nesan		G. Devarajan	Vayalar Ramavarma
Thirumul Kazcha		Viswanath		
