= Sreelatha Namboothiri filmography =

Sreelatha Namboothiri (born Anjilivelil Vasantha) is an Indian actress and playback singer who works in Malayalam cinema and television. She has acted in more than 300 films. Khadeeja in 1967 was her debut movie. The following is a complete list of her films as an actress and playback singer:

== As an actress ==
Year	Title	Role	Notes	Ref.
1953	Aashadeepam	Child artist		
1967	Khadeeja			
1967	Pavappettaval	Padma		
1968	Bhaaryamaar Sookshikkuka	A woman among the audience		
1968	Yakshi	Vanaja		
1969	Mooladhanam	Chinnamma		
1969	Rest House	Latha		
1969	Padicha Kallan			
1969	Susy	Jolly		
1969	Virunnukari	Sreelatha		
1970	Kaakkathampuraatti	Devayani		
1970	Lottery Ticket	Janamma		
1970	Aa Chithrashalabham Parannotte			
1970	Detective 909 Keralathil			
1970	Anaadha	Rajani		
1970	Rakthapushpam	Padma		
1970	Thurakkaatha Vaathil	Ambujam		
1971	Navavadhu	Rajani		
1971	Marunattil Oru Malayali			
1971	Gangasangamam	Nalini		
1971	Lanka Dahanam			
1971	Makane Ninakku Vendi	Mariakutty		
1971	Moonu Pookkal	Actress		
1971	Anaadha Shilpangal	Malathi		
1971	C.I.D. Nazir	Sreelatha		
1972	Maravil Thirivu Sookshikkuka	Chinnamma		
1972	Aadyathe Kadha	Leela		
1972	Taxi Car	Sreelatha		
1972	Kandavarundo	Kamalakshi		
1972	Mayilaadumkunnu	Eali		
1972	Shakthi			
1972	Azhumukham			
1973	Maadhavikkutty	Indira		
1973	Soundarya Pooja			
1973	Divyadarshanam	Pushpavalli		
1973	Poymughangal			
1973	Kaliyugam	Parukutty		
1973	Aphala			
1973	Interview	Ambika		
1973	Thiruvaabharanam	Leelamani		
1973	Achaani	Kalyani		
1973	Azhakulla Saleena	Tribal girl		
1973	Aashachakram	Seetha/Kusumam	Double role	
1973	Prethangalude Thaazhvara			
1973	Thottavadi			
1973	Aaraadhika	Lucy		
1974	Rahasyaraathri			
1974	Pattaabhishekam	Celina		
1974	Panchathanthram	Leela		
1974	Pathiraavum Pakalvelichavum			
1974	Swarnnavigraham			
1974	Night Duty			
1974	Naathoon			
1974	Rahasyarathri			
1974	Thacholi Marumakan Chanthu	Kuttimaani		
1974	Nagaram Saagaram			
1974	Ayalathe Sundari	Pappi		
1974	Moham			
1974	Shaapamoksham			
1974	Nadeenadanmaare Aavasyamundu			
1974	Angathattu	Malu		
1974	Arakkallan Mukkakallan	Kochummu		
1975	Pravaaham	Vanaja		
1975	Manishada			
1975	Abhimaanam			
1975	Neelaponman	Hippi		
1975	Neela Ponman	Kochu Kalyani		
1975	Swarnna Malsyam			
1975	Chief Guest	Latha		
1975	Criminals	Santha		
1975	Kottaaram Vilkkaanundu			
1975	Ayodhya	Sarasamma		
1975	Thiruvonam	Sandhyarani		
1975	Aaranyakaandam			
1975	Padmaraagam			
1975	Paalazhi Madhanam			
1975	Alibabayum 41 kallanmaarum	Sophia		
1975	Chattambikkalyaani	Lilly		
1975	Kuttichaathan			
1975	Love Marriage			
1975	Penpada	Gourikutty		
1975	Madhurappathinezhu			
1975	Mattoru Seetha			
1975	Sindhu	Kalyani/Kala		
1975	Boy Friend			
1975	Pulivaalu			
1975	Hello Darling	Latha		
1975	Velicham Akale			
1975	Kalyaana Sougandhikam			
1975	Babumon	Vasanthy		
1976	Pushpasharam			
1976	Light House	Bindu		
1976	Raathriyile Yaathrakkaar			
1976	Ozhukkinethire			
1976	Kanyaadaanam			
1976	Paarijaatham			
1976	Amritavahini	Daisy		
1976	Pick Pocket	Soudamini		
1976	Ajayanum Vijayanum			
1976	Kaamadhenu	Parukutty		
1976	Yudhabhoomi			
1976	Abhinandanam			
1976	Seemanthaputhran			
1976	Chottaanikkara Amma			
1976	Mallanum Mathevanum			
1976	Ammini Ammaavan			
1976	Kenalum Collectrum			
1976	Panchami			
1976	Prasadam	Nurse Panchali		
1977	Panchaamritham			
1977	Varadakshina			
1977	Samudram	Vilasini		
1977	Parivarthanam	Radha		
1977	Achaaram Ammini Osharam Omana	Bhavani		
1977	Amme Anupame			
1977	Itha Ivide Vare	Shankari		
1977	Aparaajitha			
1977	Lakshmi			
1977	Sukradasa			
1977	Kaavilamma			
1977	Rathimanmadhan			
1977	Akshayapaathram			
1977	Akale Aakaasham			
1977	Kannappanunni			
1977	Vishukkani	Jaya		
1977	Innale Innu			
1977	Minimol			
1977	Sridevi			
1977	Mohavum Mukthiyum			
1977	Aadyapaadam			
1977	Chathurvedam	Rajamma		
1977	Satyavan Savithri			
1977	Thuruppugulaan			
1977	Nizhale Nee Sakshi			
1977	Sakhaakkale Munnottu			
1977	Ammaayi Amma			
1977	Muttathe Mulla	Anandam		
1977	Aval Oru Devaalayam	Damayanthi		
1978	Radhai Ketra Kannan		Tamil film	
1978	Bhaaryayum Kaamukiyum			
1978	Jayikkaanaay Janichavan	Marykutty		
1978	Madaalasa			
1978	Mudramothiram	Kamalamma		
1978	Onappudava			
1978	Madanolsavam			
1978	Sathrusamhaaram			
1978	Ashtamudikkaayal			
1978	Ee Ganam Marakkumo			
1978	Nivedyam	Gomathi		
1978	Puthariyankam			
1978	Anubhoothikalude Nimisham			
1978	Avar Jeevikkunnu			
1978	Kalpavriksham	Phalgunani		
1978	Mukkuvane Snehicha Bhootham	Karthu		
1978	Etho Oru Swapnam	Susheela		
1978	Kadathanaattu Maakkam			
1978	Kudumbam Namukku Sreekovil	Rajamma		
1978	Premashilpi	Reetha		
1978	Raghuvamsham			
1978	Aval Viswasthayaayirunnu	Ammu		
1978	Paavaadakkaari			
1978	Vilakkum Velichavum			
1978	Snehikkaan Oru Pennu			
1978	Ninakku Njaanum Enikku Neeyum	Pankajakshi		
1978	Iniyum Puzhayozhukum			
1978	Praarthana			
1978	Midukkipponnamma			
1978	Tiger Salim			
1978	Chakraayudham			
1978	Randu Janmam			
1978	Vyaamoham			
1979	Allaudinaum Arputha Vilakkum		Tamil film	
1979	Agnivyooham			
1979	Lajjaavathi			
1979	Kathirmandapam			
1979	Vellaayani Paramu	Mathilakam Ponnamma		
1979	Venalil Oru Mazha			
1979	Paapathinu Maranamilla			
1979	Allauddinum Albhutha Vilakkum	Kunal		
1979	Kazhukan	Vimala		
1979	Puthiya Velicham	Sindhubhairavi		
1979	Ente Neelaakaasham			
1979	Krishnapparunthu			
1979	Saayoojyam	Sainaba		
1979	Choola			
1979	Thakara	Kamakshi		
1979	Ajnaatha Theerangal			
1979	Maanvadharmam			
1979	Pambaram			
1979	Ponnil Kulicha Rathri			
1979	Veerabhadran			
1979	Kaalam Kathu Ninnilla			
1979	Rakthamillatha Manushyan			
1979	Pichathikuttappan	C I D Radha		
1979	Yakshiparu			
1980	Benz Vasu	Stella		
1980	Ithikkarappakki	Gouri		
1980	Mr Michael	Pinku		
1980	Thakara	Kamakshi		
1980	Karipuranda Jeevithangal	Sarojini		
1980	Eden Thottam	Maami Chettathi		
1980	Aniyatha Valakal	Margratte Fernandez		
1980	Arangum Aniyarayum	Pavizham		
1980	Ammayum Makalum	Kalyani		
1980	Kalika	Gomathi		
1980	Pralayam	Gayathridevi		
1980	Sathyam	Parukuttyamma		
1980	Nattuchakkiruttu			
1980	Ambalavilakku	Rajamma		
1980	Rajaneegandhi	Bharathi		
1980	Bhaktha Hanuman	Thara		
1980	Vilkkanundu Swapnangal	Alice		
1980	Oru Varsham Oru Maasam	Rahel		
1980	Makaravialkku			
1980	Kaanthavalayam	Evelin		
1980	Youvanadaham			
1980	Pappu	Leena		
1981	Kolilakkam			
1981	Theekkali			
1981	Choothattam			
1981	Agnisaram	Gomathi		
1981	Kodumudikal	Ponnamma		
1981	Orikkalkkoodi	Prema		
1982	Priyasakhi Radha			
1983	Ashtapadhi	Sreedevi's sister		
1983	Kaathirunna Divasam	Malini's mother		
1984	Ente Graamam			
1984	Oru Nimisham Tharoo	Kalyani		
1985	Ee Sabdam Innathe Sabdam			
1992	Sooryachakram			
2001	Theerthadanam			
2001	Saari			
2002	Anuraagam			
2003	Sthithi			
2006	Pathaaka	Kunjamma		
2006	Yes Your Honour	Maya's mother		
2007	Flash	Dhwani's kin		
2007	Nasrani	Kochammini		
2007	Bharathan Effect	Andipurakkal Annamma		
2007	Vinodayathra	Soshamma		
2008	Innathe Chintha Vishayam	Rehna's mother in law		
2008	Roudram	Chief Minister's wife		
2008	Parunthu	Mahendran's mother		
2008	Lollypop	Chandy's ammachi		
2008	Minnaminnikoottam	Manikunju's grandmother		
2008	Pachamarathanalil	Anu's neighbour		
2008	Madampi	Gouriyamma		
2009	Vairam: Fight for Justice	Paatti		
2009	Thirunakkara Perumal	Shoshamma		
2009	Vellathooval	Jiya's grandmother		
2009	Makante Achan	Viswanathan's mother		
2009	Kerala Cafe	Johnykutty's mother	Segment: "Nostalgia"	
2009	Bhagavan	Minister's mother		
2009	Pramani	Somasekharan's mother		
2010	Alexander the Great	Verma's kin		
2010	Koottukar			
2010	Shikkar	Eli		
2010	Aathmakatha	Paili		
2010	Tournament – Play & Replay	Hotel Akka		
2010	Marykkundoru Kunjaadu	Kochuthresia		
2011	Janapriyan	Bhanumathi		
2011	Ponnu Kondoru Aalroopam			
2011	Killadi Raman	Seethalakshmi's mother		
2011	Lucky Jokers	Chithira Thampuratti		
2011	Payyans	Brittas's mother		
2012	Poppins	Kochu		
2012	Madirasi	Ganga		
2012	Thiruvambadi Thamban	Thamban's grandmother		
2012	Kapalika			
2012	Manthrikan	Mukundanunni's mother		
2012	Ee Thirakkinidayil	Eliyamma		
2012	Banking Hours 10 to 4	Fernandez's sister		
2012	No. 66 Madhura Bus	Omana		
2012	Spirit	Krishnan Nair's wife		
2013	Ladies and Gentleman	Bhanumathiyamma		
2013	Rebecca Uthup Kizhakkemala	Mahalakshmi		
2013	Nadodimannan	Subair's Umma		
2013	Tourist Home	Sweeper		
2013	Bundy Chor			
2013	The Power of Silence	Aravindan's mother		
2013	Vishudhan	Mother Superior of Snehalayam		
2014	Snehamulloral Koodeyullappol	Saradha		
2014	Thomson Villa	Ammini		
2014	Flat No. 4B	Mary		
2014	Testpaper			
2014	Homely Meals	Alan's grandmother		
2014	100 Degree Celsius	Nancy's mother in law		
2014	Varsham	Thanka		
2015	Njan Samvidhanam Cheyyum	Soudamini		
2015	Pickles	Abhi's grandmother		
2015	Vidhooshakan	Ravunni's mother		
2015	Rock Star	Guru's mother		
2016	Oppam	Krishnamoorthy's Akka		
2016	Puthiya Niyamam	Adv. Louis Pothen's mother		
2017	Njanum Neeyum Nammude Mobilum			
2017	Boby	Kunjumol		
2017	Fukri	Fukri's sister		
2017	Honey Bee 2: Celebrations	Punyalan's kin		
2017	Honey Bee 2.5	Herself		
2018	Captain	Anitha's grandmother		
2018	Ladoo	Suresh's mother		
2019	Ambili	Teena's grandmother		
2021	Varthamanam			
2021	Nizhal	Lisamma		
2021	Naalekkayi	Meenakshiyamma		
2022	Makal	Mental Patient		
2022	Panthrandu	Rossy		
2023	Vaasam	Grandmother		
2024	Iyer in Arabia	Flat president Sharadhamma		
2026	Ananthan Kaadu	Radha		

== As a playback singer ==
- "Kakkakkarumbikale"... Ezhu Raathrikal (1968)
- "Hari Krishna Krishna"... Vazhi Pizhacha Santhathi (1968)
- "Pankajadalanayane"... Vazhi Pizhacha Santhathi (1968)
- "Ithuvare Pennoru"... Kaliyalla Kalyaanam (1968)
- "Midumidukkan Meeshkkomban"... Kaliyalla Kalyaanam (1968)
- "Kaalamenna Kaaranavarkku"... Kallichellamma (1969)
- "Kanne Karale"... Aashaachakram (1973)
- "Udalathiramyam"... Divyadarshanam (1973)
- "Velutha Vavinum"... Chakravaakam (1974)
- "Kaathilla Poothilla"... Arakkallan Mukkaalkkallan (1974)
- "Pachamalakkiliye"... Thacholi Marumakan Chanthu (1974)
- "Onnaaman Kochuthumbi"... Thacholi Marumakan Chanthu (1974)
- "Sreemahaaganapathi"... Night Duty (1974)
- "Innu Ninte Youvanathinezhazhaku"... Night Duty (1974)
- "Thankabhasmakkuri" (Parody) ... Rahasyaraathri (1974)
- "Malayalam Beauty"... Padmaraagam (1975)
- "Bahar Se Koy"... Hello Darling (1975)
- "Angaadi Marunnukal"... Amrithavaahini (1976)
- "Kothikkothi"... Pushpasharam (1976)
- "Yadukula Maadhava"... Sindooram (1976)
- "Ariyaamo Ningalkkariyaamo"... Priyamvada (1976)
- "Kale Ninne Kandappol"... Mohavum Mukthiyum (1977)
- "Chora Thilaykkum Kaalam"... Raghuvamsham (1978)
- "Aavo Mera" ... Sathrusamhaaram (1978)
- "Maasapadikkare"... Ithikkarappakki (1980)
- "Punnarapponnumon"... Ithikkarappakki (1980)
- "Thinkalkkala Thirumudiyil Choodum"... Ithikkarappakki (1980)
- "Thaamarappoovanathile"... Ithikkarappakki (1980)

== Dramas ==
- Koottukudumbam
- Yudhakandam

== Television serials ==
Year	Serial	Role	Channel	Notes	Ref.
2003	Thulasidalam	Chandroth Bhageerathi	Surya TV		
2005	Orma	Paalattamma	Asianet		
2005	Kadamattathu Kathanar	Kumki	Asianet		
2006	Ohari		Surya TV		
2006	Ammamanassu		Asianet		
2006	Ivide Ellavarkum Sukham		Asianet		
2007	Velankani Mathavu		Surya TV		
2007	Sree Guruvayoorappan		Surya TV		
2008	Kunchiyammakku Anchu Makkalanne	Kunchiyamma	Amrita TV		
2008	Aliyanmarum Penganmarum		Amrita TV		
2008	Thulabharam		Surya TV		
2008–2009	My Dear Kuttichathan 2	Maggie aunty	Asianet		
2009	Akkare Ikkare	Roshan's grandmother	Asianet		
2009	Vadakaikkoru Hridayam		Amrita TV		
2009	Kathayariyathe		Surya TV		
2009	Swami Ayyappan Saranam		Asianet		
2010–2011	Autograph	Maggie aunty	Asianet		
2010–2011	Swamiye Saranamayyappa		Surya TV		
2010–2012	Harichandanam	Mangalathu Rajeshwari Amma	Asianet		
2011	Alaudinte Albuthavilakku		Asianet		
2011	John De Panic	Lavaranteena	Mazhavil Manorama		
2011–2012	Paattukalude Paattu	Kichu's mother	Surya TV		
2012	Mangalyapattu		Kairali TV		
2012	Achante Makkal		Surya TV		
2012	Decent Family		Jaihind TV		
2012–2014	Pattu Saree	Athai	Mazhavil Manorama		
2013	Oru Penninte Katha		Mazhavil Manorama		
2013	Chattambi Kalyani	Susheela	Jaihind TV		
2013	Vadhu		Surya TV		
2014–2019	Karuthamuthu	Shekaran's mother	Asianet		
2014	Bhargavinilayam Ladies Only		Media One		
2015	Thoovalsparsham	Ambat Sethulakshmi	DD Malayalam		
2015	Bandhuru Shathruvaru	Sulochana	Mazhavil Manorama		
2015	Swami Vivekanandan		Janam TV		
2015	Meghasandesham		Kairali TV		
2016	Amme Mahamaye		Surya TV		
2016	Bhasi Bahadoor	Ponnamma Teacher	Mazhavil Manorama		
2017–2022	Thatteem Mutteem	Komalavalli	Mazhavil Manorama		
2017–2020	Sthreepadham	Jagadamma	Mazhavil Manorama		
2017–2021	Kasthooriman	Vijayalakshmi	Asianet		
2018	Mizhineerpoovu		ACV		
2019	Arayannangalude Veedu	Kunjamma	Flowers TV	Replaced Ponnamma Babu	
2020	Anuragam	Abhi's grandmother	Mazhavil Manorama		
2020–2021	Namam Japikunna Veedu	Mandhakini	Mazhavil Manorama		
2021-2023	Paadatha Painkili	Panamthottathil Elizabeth	Asianet		
2021-2024	Kaliveedu	Maheshwariyamma	Surya TV		
2021- 2022	Urulakku Upperi	Ram's mother	Amrita TV		
2023	Surabhiyum Suhasiniyum	Seetha Lakshmi	Flowers TV		
2023	Bhavana	Maheshwari	Surya TV		
2024	Etho Janma Kalpanayil	Subhadramma	Asianet	Replaced by Geetha Nair	
2024-2025	Pookkalam	Muthassi	Mazhavil Manorama		

== TV shows ==
As Host

- Devageetham (Asianet) - Singer
- Sangeethika

Reality show as Judge

- Comedy Circus (Mazhavil Manorama)
- Comedy Stars (Asianet)
- Idea Star Singer (Asianet)

As Guest

- Charithram Enniloode - Presenter
- Straight Line
- Onnum Onnum Moonnu
- Oru Chiri Iruchiri Bumper Chiri
- Annie's Kitchen
- Onaruchikaliloode Sreelatha Namboothiri
- Comedy Super Nite
- Ivide Ingannanu Bhai
- Varthaprabhatham
- Humorous Talk Show
- Badai Bungalow
- Katha Ithuvare
- Tharapakittu
- Ennishtam
- Ormayilennum
- Thiranottam
- Jeevitham Ithuvare
- Nere Chovve
- My Favourites
- Nammal Thammil
- Red Carpet - Mentor
- Parayam Nedam - Participant
- Panam Tharum Padam - Participant
- Flowers Oru Kodi - Participant
- Star Magic
