= Ayalathe Sundari =

- Directed by: Hariharan
- Written by: Dr. Balakrishnan (dialogues)
- Screenplay by: Hariharan
- Produced by: G. P. Balan
- Starring: Prem Nazir; Jayabharathi; Srividya; Raghavan
- Cinematography: T. N. Krishnankutty Nair
- Edited by: V. P. Krishnan
- Music by: Shankar–Ganesh; S. D. Burman
- Production company: Chanthamani Films
- Distributed by: Chanthamani Films
- Release date: 2 August 1974
- Country: India
- Language: Malayalam

Ayalathe Sundari is a 1974 Indian Malayalam film, directed by Hariharan and produced by G. P. Balan. The film stars Prem Nazir, Jayabharathi, Srividya and Raghavan in the lead roles. Shankar–Ganesh and S. D. Burman composed the music.

== Cast ==
- Prem Nazir as Ravi
- Jayabharathi as Shreedevi
- Srividya as Malini
- Raghavan as Venu
- Adoor Bhasi as Gopal/Palgo
- Prema as Karthyani
- Sankaradi as Kuttan Nair
- Shobha
- Sreelatha Namboothiri as Pappi
- T. R. Omana as Saraswathi Amma
- T. S. Muthaiah as Panicker
- Bahadoor as Pappu Pilla
- K. P. Ummer as Damu
- Khadeeja as Pushokasa
- Meena as Meenakshi
- Sadhana as Margosa
- Sudheer

== Soundtrack ==
The music was composed by Shankar–Ganesh and S. D. Burman and the lyrics were written by Mankombu Gopalakrishnan and Anand Bakshi.

No.	Song	Singers	Lyrics	Length (m:ss)
1	"Kora Kaagaz" (Aaraadhana)	Kishore Kumar, Lata Mangeshkar	Anand Bakshi	
2	"Chithravarnapushpajaalamorukki"	Vani Jairam	Mankombu Gopalakrishnan	
3	"Hemamaalini"	P. Jayachandran, L. R. Eeswari, Srividya, K. P. Chandramohan	Mankombu Gopalakrishnan	
4	"Lakshaarchana"	K. J. Yesudas	Mankombu Gopalakrishnan	
5	"Neelameghakkuda Nivarthi"	K. J. Yesudas	Mankombu Gopalakrishnan	
6	"Swarna Chembakam"	P. Jayachandran, L. R. Eeswari, Srividya, K. P. Chandramohan	Mankombu Gopalakrishnan	
7	"Thrayambakam Villodinju"	K. J. Yesudas	Mankombu Gopalakrishnan	
