= Ezhuthatha Kadha =

- Directed by: A. B. Raj
- Written by: E. P. Kurian; P. R. Chandran; Jagathy N. K. Achari (dialogues)
- Screenplay by: Jagathy N. K. Achari
- Produced by: T. E. Vasudevan
- Starring: Prem Nazir; Sheela; Adoor Bhasi; Muthukulam Raghavan Pillai
- Cinematography: Ashok Kumar
- Edited by: B. S. Mani
- Music by: V. Dakshinamoorthy
- Production company: Jaya Maruthi
- Distributed by: Jaya Maruthi
- Release date: 21 May 1970
- Country: India
- Language: Malayalam

Ezhuthatha Kadha (transl. The unwritten story) is a 1970 Indian Malayalam-language film, directed by A. B. Raj and produced by T. E. Vasudevan. The film stars Prem Nazir, Sheela, Adoor Bhasi and Muthukulam Raghavan Pillai. The film had musical score by V. Dakshinamoorthy.

== Plot ==
Prathapan wants to publish memoirs of Kamalamma, a former prostitute and stage star. When her former clients learn about this, they try everything in their power to stop it from being published.

== Cast ==
- Prem Nazir as Prathapachandran
- Sheela as Kayamkulam Kamalamma
- Adoor Bhasi as Bhaskaran Pillai
- Muthukulam Raghavan Pillai as Raghavan Pillai
- Sankaradi as Tabalist Shanku Asan
- T. R. Omana as Eashwariyamma, Prathapachandran's Mother
- Chandrakala as Meena
- G. K. Pillai as Palathara Thomachan
- K. P. Ummer as Gopalan Nair
- Meena as Mrs. Nair
- Nellikode Bhaskaran as Drama-troupe Manager
- Paravoor Bharathan as Padmanabhan
- Thikkurissy Sukumaran Nair as Parameswaran/Kattazham Karthavu
- T. K. Balachandran as Blind Singer, drama artist
- Paul Vengola as Advocate's clerk
- Vanchiyoor Radha as Manager's sister
- Thodupuzha Radhakrishnan as Govindan Muthalali
- Abbas as Palathara Thomachan's gunda
- Rathidevi as Young Meena
- Vembayam Thampi as committee secretary

== Soundtrack ==
The music was composed by V. Dakshinamoorthy and the lyrics were written by Sreekumaran Thampi.

No.	Song	Singers	Lyrics	Length (m:ss)
1	"Ambalamanikal"	P. Leela	Sreekumaran Thampi	
2	"Kannundenkilum"	K. J. Yesudas	Sreekumaran Thampi	
3	"Manassenna Marathaka Dweepil"	K. J. Yesudas	Sreekumaran Thampi	
4	"Praanaveena Than"	P. Jayachandran, B. Vasantha	Sreekumaran Thampi	
5	"Udayathaarame"	B. Vasantha	Sreekumaran Thampi	
6	"Venkottakkudakkeezhil"	P. Leela, Chorus	Sreekumaran Thampi	
