= Lakshmi (1977 film) =

- Directed by: J. Sasikumar
- Written by: C. M. Muthu; M. R. Joseph (dialogues)
- Screenplay by: M. R. Joseph
- Produced by: E. K. Thyagarajan
- Starring: Prem Nazir; Sheela; Vijayasree; Adoor Bhasi
- Cinematography: C. J. Mohan
- Edited by: K. Sankunni
- Music by: G. Devarajan
- Production company: Sree Murugalaya Films
- Distributed by: Sree Murugalaya Films
- Release date: 17 June 1977
- Country: India
- Language: Malayalam
- Box office: Big box office hit

Lakshmi is a 1977 Indian Malayalam film, directed by J. Sasikumar and produced by E. K. Thyagarajan. The film stars Prem Nazir, Sheela, Vijayasree and Adoor Bhasi in the lead roles. The film's musical score was by G. Devarajan.

== Cast ==
- Prem Nazir as Krishnan
- Sheela as Lakshmi
- Jayabharathi as Nirmala
- Adoor Bhasi as Shankharanarayanan
- Sankaradi as Madhavan Thamphi
- Sreelatha Namboothiri as Aasha
- Bahadoor as Pappu
- M. G. Soman as Rajan
- Meena as Meenakshi amma

== Soundtrack ==
The music was composed by G. Devarajan and the lyrics were written by Sreekumaran Thampi.

No.	Song	Singers	Lyrics	Length (m:ss)
1	"Jaathimallippoomazhayil"	P. Jayachandran	Sreekumaran Thampi	
2	"Kanikkonnayalla Njan"	K. J. Yesudas	Sreekumaran Thampi	
3	"Kurutholathoranam"	P. Susheela	Sreekumaran Thampi	
4	"Pavizhapponmala Padavile Kaavil"	K. J. Yesudas, P. Madhuri	Sreekumaran Thampi	
