= Beena (film) =

1978 film

- Theatrical release poster
- Directed by: I. V. Sasi
- Produced by: Sheriff
- Starring: Sheela; Madhu; Jayabharathi; K. P. Ummer
- Cinematography: N. A. Thara
- Edited by: K. Narayanan
- Music by: Kannur Rajan
- Production company: Vijisoochi Films
- Distributed by: Vijisoochi Films
- Release date: 19 November 1978
- Country: India
- Language: Malayalam

Beena is a 1978 Indian Malayalam-language film directed by I. V. Sasi and produced by Sheriff. The film stars Madhu, Sheela, Sudheer, K. P. Ummer, Jayabharathi and Sathar in the lead roles. The film has musical score by Kannur Rajan.

== Cast ==
- Madhu as Prof. Sreenivasan
- Jayabharathi as Beena
- Sudheer as Prasad
- Jose as Venu gopal
- Pattom Sadan as Ravi
- Sathaar as Sharath Chandhran
- Unnimary as Guest appearance in song Kaakkatudilukal
- P. R. Varalakshmi as Malathy
- Master Sekhar as Young Ravi

== Soundtrack ==
The music was composed by Kannur Rajan and the lyrics were written by Bichu Thirumala and Appan Thacheth.

No.	Song	Singers	Lyrics	Length (m:ss)
1	"Kaakkathudalikal"	Ambili	Bichu Thirumala	
2	"Neeyoru Vasantham"	K. J. Yesudas	Bichu Thirumala	
3	"Oru Swapnathin"	P. Susheela, Vani Jairam	Appan Thacheth	
4	"Oru Swapnathin" (Pathos)	P. Susheela, Vani Jairam	Appan Thachethu	
