= Mayiladumkunnu =

- Directed by: S. Babu
- Written by: Muttathu Varkey; K. T. Muhammad (dialogues)
- Screenplay by: K. T. Muhammad
- Produced by: Chithrakala Kendram
- Starring: Prem Nazir; Jayabharathi; K.P. Ummer; Adoor Bhasi; Muthukulam Raghavan Pillai
- Cinematography: Asthan
- Edited by: T. R. Sreenivasalu
- Music by: G. Devarajan
- Production company: Chithrakalakendram
- Distributed by: Chithrakalakendram
- Release date: 28 April 1972
- Country: India
- Language: Malayalam

Mayiladumkunnu is a 1972 Indian Malayalam-language film directed by S. Babu and produced by Chithrakala Kendram. The film stars Prem Nazir, Jayabharathi, K. P. Ummer, Adoor Bhasi and Muthukulam Raghavan Pillai in the lead roles. The film has musical score by G. Devarajan.

== Cast ==
- Prem Nazir as Joy
- Jayabharathi as Lisa
- K. P. Ummer as Rajappan
- Adoor Bhasi as Mathan
- Muthukulam Raghavan Pillai as Rosamma's father
- Sankaradi as Outha
- Sreelatha Namboothiri as Eli
- T. R. Omana as Rosanna
- Adoor Bhavani as Mariya
- Khadeeja as Eli's mother
- Paravoor Bharathan as George
- Sujatha as Leela
- Master Sekhar
- Sobha as Young Lisa

== Soundtrack ==
The music was composed by G. Devarajan and the lyrics were written by Vayalar Ramavarma.

No.	Song	Singers	Lyrics	Length (m:ss)
1	"Eeso Mariyam"	P. Susheela	Vayalar Ramavarma	
2	"Manichikkaatte"	P. Susheela, P. Madhuri	Vayalar Ramavarma	
3	"Paappi Appacha"	C. O. Anto, Latha Raju	Vayalar Ramavarma	
4	"Sandhyamayangum Neram"	K. J. Yesudas	Vayalar Ramavarma	
5	"Thaalikkuruthola"	P. Leela	Vayalar Ramavarma	

== Legacy ==
All songs of this movie are still popular.

Lead characters in the 2010 movie Paappi Appacha by Dileep and Innocent pair have a similar lifestyle to the comedians in the "Paappi Appacha" song of this movie.
