= Kaavilamma =

- Directed by: N. Sankaran Nair
- Written by: Jagathy N. K. Achari
- Screenplay by: Jagathy N. K. Achari
- Starring: Madhu; Jayan; Sheela; Jagathy Sreekumar
- Cinematography: J. Williams
- Edited by: Sasikumar
- Music by: G. Devarajan
- Production company: KK Productions
- Distributed by: KK Productions
- Release date: 5 August 1977
- Country: India
- Language: Malayalam

Kaavilamma is a 1977 Indian Malayalam film, directed N. Sankaran Nair. The film stars Madhu, Jayan, Sheela and Jagathy Sreekumar in the lead roles. The film has musical score by G. Devarajan.

== Cast ==
- Madhu
- Jayan
- Sheela
- Jagathy Sreekumar
- Manavalan Joseph
- Pattom Sadan
- Sreelatha Namboothiri
- Bahadoor
- Mallika Sukumaran
- Vettoor Purushan

== Soundtrack ==
The music was composed by G. Devarajan and the lyrics were written by O. N. V. Kurup.

No.	Song	Singers	Lyrics	Length (m:ss)
1	"Chandramukhi"	K. J. Yesudas	O. N. V. Kurup	
2	"Kaavilamme"	P. Madhuri, Chorus	O. N. V. Kurup	
3	"Mangalaambike Maaye"	Vani Jairam	O. N. V. Kurup	
4	"Unnipponkavililorumma"	P. Madhuri	O. N. V. Kurup	
5	"Ward Number Ezhiloru"	C. O. Anto	O. N. V. Kurup	
