= Aashachakram =

1973 film

- Directed by: Dr. Seetharamaswamy
- Written by: M. A. Poosala; Kedamangalam Sadanandan (dialogues)
- Starring: Sathyan; Thikkurissy Sukumaran Nair; Sankaradi; Raghavan
- Music by: B. A. Chidambaranath
- Production company: Vijayavasu Productions
- Distributed by: Vijayavasu Productions
- Release date: 14 December 1973
- Country: India
- Language: Malayalam

Aashachakram is a 1973 Indian Malayalam-language film, directed by Dr. Seetharamaswamy. The film stars Sathyan, Thikkurissy Sukumaran Nair, Sankaradi and Raghavan. The film had musical score by B. A. Chidambaranath.

== Cast ==
- Sathyan as Ravichandran
- Thikkurissy Sukumaran Nair as Rajasekharan
- Sankaradi as Ramu
- Raghav as Gopalan
- Poosala as N Maran/Kumar Chandran
- Ushakumari as Hema
- P. R. Menon as Manager
- Sreelatha Namboothiri as Seetha, Kusumam (double role)

== Soundtrack ==
The music was composed by B. A. Chidambaranath and the lyrics were written by P. Bhaskaran, Kedamangalam Sadanandan and M. K. R. Paattyath.

No.	Song	Singers	Lyrics	Length (m:ss)
1	"Chandana Vishariyumaay"	K. J. Yesudas, B. Vasantha	P. Bhaskaran	
2	"Chandralekhathan"	B. Vasantha	P. Bhaskaran	
3	"Deva Nin Chevadikal"	B. Vasantha	P. Bhaskaran	
4	"Kadalaadi Thedi"	B. Vasantha	Kedamangalam Sadanandan	
5	"Kanne Karale"	Pappukutty Bhagavathar, Sreelatha Namboothiri	M. K. R. Paattyath	
6	"Poonkozhi Thannude"	K. J. Yesudas, P. Leela	P. Bhaskaran	
7	"Sneham Thannude"	Sathyam	P. Bhaskaran	
