= Aa Chithrashalabham Parannotte =

1970 film directed by P. Balthasar

- Directed by: P. Balthasar
- Written by: K. Sivadas
- Screenplay by: K. Sivadas
- Produced by: P. Balthasar
- Starring: Prem Nazir; Sheela; Kaviyoor Ponnamma; Adoor Bhasi
- Cinematography: T. N. Krishnankutty Nair
- Edited by: N. P. Suresh; T. R. Sreenivasalu
- Music by: G. Devarajan
- Release date: 29 October 1970
- Country: India
- Language: Malayalam

Aa Chithrashalabham Parannotte (transl. Let that butterfly fly) is a 1970 Indian Malayalam-language film directed and produced by P. Balthasar. The film stars Prem Nazir, Sheela, Kaviyoor Ponnamma and Adoor Bhasi in the lead roles. The film has musical score by G. Devarajan.

== Cast ==
- Prem Nazir as Chandran
- Sheela as Indira
- Kaviyoor Ponnamma as Lakshmi
- Adoor Bhasi as Sankarankutty
- Kottayam Santha as Ponnamma
- Muthukulam Raghavan Pillai as Ramani
- Prema as Narayani
- Sankaradi as Keshava Kurup
- Sreelatha Namboothiri as Mrs Moncy Digola
- T. R. Omana as Gowriyamma
- Alummoodan as Lukka
- Bahadoor as Krishna Pillai
- Nellikode Bhaskaran as Gangadharan
- Radhamani as Asha
- Khadeeja as Kuttyamma
- Ushanandini as Usha

== Soundtrack ==
The music was composed by G. Devarajan and the lyrics were written by Vayalar Ramavarma and K. Sivadas.

| No. | Song | Singers | Lyrics | Length (m:ss) |
|---|---|---|---|---|
| 1 | "Kannanente Kalithozhan" | P. Madhuri | Vayalar Ramavarma | |
| 2 | "Karayaathe Muthe" | P. Susheela | Vayalar Ramavarma | |
| 3 | "Kavithayo Ninte Kannil" (Kathaprasangam) | P. B. Sreenivas, Sivadas | K. Sivadas | |
| 4 | "Kurukkan Raajaavaayi" | P. Madhuri | Vayalar Ramavarma | |
| 5 | "Prakrithi Yuvathi" | K. J. Yesudas | Vayalar Ramavarma | |
