= Divyadharsanam =

- Directed by: J. Sasikumar
- Written by: Jagathy N. K. Achari
- Screenplay by: Jagathy N. K. Achari
- Starring: Madhu, Bahadoor; Sankaradi; Thikkurissy Sukumaran Nair; Adoor Bhasi
- Cinematography: N. Karthikeyan
- Edited by: M. Umanath
- Music by: M. S. Viswanathan
- Production company: MB Films
- Distributed by: MB Films
- Release date: 16 November 1973
- Country: India
- Language: Malayalam

Divyadharsanam is a 1973 Indian Malayalam-language film, directed by J. Sasikumar. The film stars Bahadoor, Sankaradi, Thikkurissy Sukumaran Nair and Adoor Bhasi. The film had musical score by M. S. Viswanathan.

== Cast ==
- Bahadoor
- Sankaradi
- Thikkurissy Sukumaran Nair
- Adoor Bhasi
- Kaviyoor Ponnamma
- Jayabharathi
- Madhu
- K. P. Ummer
- S. P. Pillai
- Pattom Sadan
- Adoor Bhavani
- Sreelatha Namboothiri

== Soundtrack ==
Divyadarshanam

Soundtrack album by M. S. Viswanathan
- Released: 1973
- Recorded: 1973
- Genre: Feature film soundtrack

The music was composed by M. S. Viswanathan and the lyrics were written by Sreekumaran Thampi, Thunchathezhuthachan and Kunjan Nambiar.

No.	Song	Singers	Lyrics	Length (m:ss)
1	"Aakaasharoopini"	K. J. Yesudas	Sreekumaran Thampi	
2	"Abhidhwayam"			
3	"Ambalavilakkukal"	K. J. Yesudas	Sreekumaran Thampi	
4	"Anila Tharala" (Bit)	P. Leela		
5	"Ha Ha Vallabhe"	P. Leela	Thunchathezhuthachan	
6	"Haa Raamaputhraa"	P. Leela	Thunchathezhuthachan	
7	"Karppoora Deepathin"	P. Jayachandran, B. Vasantha	Sreekumaran Thampi	
8	"Kunnukal Pole"	P. Leela	Thunchathezhuthachan	
9	"Swarna Gopura"	P. Jayachandran	Sreekumaran Thampi	
10	"Thripurasundari"	P. Leela	Sreekumaran Thampi	
11	"Udalathiramyam"	Chorus, Sreelatha Namboothiri	Kunjan Nambiar	
12	"Udichaal Asthamikkum"	M. S. Viswanathan	Sreekumaran Thampi	
13	"Vallam Pilla"		Sreekumaran Thampi	
