= Madhurappathinezhu =

- Directed by: Hariharan
- Written by: Dr. Balakrishnan
- Screenplay by: Dr. Balakrishnan
- Produced by: T. E. Vasudevan
- Starring: Sudheer; Sumithra; KP Ummer; Raghavan
- Cinematography: T. N. Krishnankutty Nair
- Edited by: M. N. Appu
- Music by: A. T. Ummer
- Production company: Jaya Maruthi
- Distributed by: Jaya Maruthi
- Release date: 21 February 1975
- Country: India
- Language: Malayalam

Madhurappathinezhu is a 1975 Indian Malayalam film, directed by Hariharan and produced by T. E. Vasudevan. The film stars Raghavan, Sudheer, KP Ummer and Sumithra in the lead roles. The film has musical score by A. T. Ummer.

== Cast ==
- K. P. Ummer
- Raghavan
- Sudheer
- Sumithra
- Adoor Bhasi
- Sankaradi
- Sreelatha Namboothiri
- Alummoodan
- Meena
- N. Govindankutty
- Paravoor Bharathan

== Soundtrack ==
The music was composed by A. T. Ummer and the lyrics were written by Sreekumaran Thampi.

No.	Song	Singers	Lyrics	Length (m:ss)
1	"Ajnaatha Pushpame"	K. J. Yesudas	Sreekumaran Thampi	
2	"Ananthapuram Kaattile"	K. J. Yesudas, K. P. Brahmanandan	Sreekumaran Thampi	
3	"Malsaram Malsaram"	K. J. Yesudas, S. Janaki, Chorus	Sreekumaran Thampi	
4	"Pushpangal Bhoomiyile"	K. P. Brahmanandan, B. Vasantha	Sreekumaran Thampi	
5	"Raagamaay Njaan Virunnu Varaam"	P. Madhuri	Sreekumaran Thampi	
6	"Udayakaahalam"	K. J. Yesudas	Sreekumaran Thampi	
7	"Uparodham Kondu Naam"	S. Janaki	Sreekumaran Thampi	
