= Khadeeja (film) =

- Directed by: M. Krishnan Nair
- Written by: Kottayam Chellappan; K. G. Sethunath (dialogues)
- Screenplay by: K. G. Sethunath
- Produced by: Kalaratnam
- Starring: Sathyan; Madhu; Sheela; Sukumari
- Cinematography: Mohan Rao
- Edited by: V. P. Krishnan
- Music by: M. S. Baburaj
- Production company: Kalaratnam Films
- Distributed by: Kalaratnam Films
- Release date: 18 August 1967
- Country: India
- Language: Malayalam

Khadeeja is a 1967 Indian Malayalam film, directed by M. Krishnan Nair and produced by Kalaratnam. The film stars Sathyan, Madhu, Sheela and Sukumari in the lead roles. The film had musical score by M. S. Baburaj.

== Plot ==
Complex family dynamics, community gossip, and tragic misunderstandings define this village drama.

A car crash claims the lives of a dedicated doctor's wife and daughter, prompting malicious local gossips to invent an illicit affair between the grieving widower and his neighboring friend.

The rumors quickly poison the doctor's own household, turning his father and brother-in-law against him. The truth is finally restored by the husband of the neighboring woman's returning from is job. However, the physical and emotional trauma of the village's hostility ultimately claims the life of the young daughter of the neighboring couple just as they attempt to escape the toxicity of the village.

== Cast ==
- Sathyan
- Madhu
- Sheela
- Sukumari
- Jayabharathi
- Manavalan Joseph
- Sebastian
- Sreelatha Namboothiri
- Baby Kumudam
- Bahadoor
- K. P. Ummer
- Kaduvakulam Antony
- Kamaladevi
- Kottayam Chellappan
- S. P. Pillai

== Soundtrack ==
The music was composed by M. S. Baburaj and the lyrics were written by Yusufali Kechery.

No.	Song	Singers	Lyrics	Length (m:ss)
1	"Ananthashayanaa"	S. Janaki, B. Vasantha	Yusufali Kechery	
2	"Chakkaravaakku"	Zero Babu	Yusufali Kechery	
3	"Kanmuna Neetti Monjum Kaatti"	L. R. Eeswari, Chorus	Yusufali Kechery	
4	"Karalil Virinja"	S. Janaki	Yusufali Kechery	
5	"Kasavinte Thattamittu"	B. Vasantha	Yusufali Kechery	
6	"Khadeeje Khadeeje"	P. Thankam	Yusufali Kechery	
7	"Surumayezhuthiya"	K. J. Yesudas	Yusufali Kechery	
