= Siva Thandavum =

Siva Thandavam
- LP Vinyl Records Cover
- Directed by: N. Sankaran Nair
- Written by: N. Sankaran Nair
- Screenplay by: N. Sankaran Nair
- Produced by: Padmanabhan; Sarathi
- Starring: Kamal Haasan; Jayasudha; M. G. Soman; Kaviyoor Ponnamma
- Cinematography: J. Williams
- Music by: M. B. Sreenivasan
- Production company: Abhayam Movies
- Distributed by: Vijaya Movies
- Release date: 3 February 1977
- Country: India
- Language: Malayalam

Siva Thandavam (transl. The Dance of Shiva) is a 1977 Indian Malayalam-language film, directed by N. Sankaran Nair. The film stars Kamal Haasan, Jayasudha, M. G. Soman and Kaviyoor Ponnamma in the lead roles. The film has musical score by M. B. Sreenivasan. Kamal Haasan recorded his voice for a song for the first time in Malayalam, although the lyrics were in English.

== Cast ==
- Kamal Haasan
- Jayasudha
- M. G. Soman
- Kaviyoor Ponnamma
- Bahadoor

== Soundtrack ==
The music was composed by M. B. Sreenivasan, and the lyrics were written by Perumpuzha Gopalakrishnan and M. B. Sreenivasan.

No.	Song	Singers	Lyrics	Length (m:ss)
1	"Anthimayangiyilla"	Vani Jairam	Perumpuzha Gopalakrishnan	
2	"Hemanthini"	K. J. Yesudas	Perumpuzha Gopalakrishnan	
3	"Njanoru Veenaadhaari"	K. J. Yesudas	Perumpuzha Gopalakrishnan	
4	"Peethaambaraa Oh Krishnaa"	Kamal Haasan, Usha Uthup	M. B. Sreenivasan	
5	"Uduthorungiya"	Vani Jairam	Perumpuzha Gopalakrishnan	

== Release ==
Siva Thandavam was released on 3 February 1977, and the final length of the film was 3,462.04 metres (11,358.4 ft).
