= Veerabhadran =

- Directed by: N. Sankaran Nair
- Written by: V. T. Nandakumar; Thoppil Bhasi (dialogues)
- Screenplay by: L. N. Potti
- Produced by: L. N. Potti
- Starring: Sukumari; Hari; Ambika; Lalu Alex
- Cinematography: Jayanan Vincent
- Edited by: Sasikumar
- Music by: G. Devarajan
- Production company: Lakshminarayana Pictures
- Distributed by: Lakshminarayana Pictures
- Release date: 23 February 1979
- Country: India
- Language: Malayalam

Veerabhadran is a 1979 Indian Malayalam film, directed by N. Sankaran Nair and produced by L. N. Potti. The film stars Sukumari, Hari, Ambika and Lalu Alex in the lead roles. The film has musical score by G. Devarajan.

== Cast ==
- Sukumari
- Hari
- Ambika
- Lalu Alex
- Nellikode Bhaskaran
- Ushakumari
- Rama

== Soundtrack ==
The music was composed by G. Devarajan and the lyrics were written by L. N. Potti.

No.	Song	Singers	Lyrics	Length (m:ss)
1	"Kanna Kanna"	Rajalakshmi	L. N. Potti	
2	"Karakaanaakkadal"	Suryakumar	L. N. Potti	
3	"Premanjanakkuri"	Rajalakshmi	L. N. Potti	
4	"Vadaamallippoovukale"	Suryakumar	L. N. Potti	
