= Thapaswini =

1971 film by M. Krishnan Nair

- Poster
- Directed by: M. Krishnan Nair
- Written by: Jagathy N. K. Achari
- Screenplay by: Jagathy N. K. Achari
- Produced by: P. I. M. Kasim
- Starring: Prem Nazir; Sheela; Adoor Bhasi; Jose Prakash
- Cinematography: Dathu
- Edited by: V. P. Krishnan
- Music by: G. Devarajan
- Production company: Sony Pictures
- Distributed by: Sony Pictures
- Release date: 3 September 1971
- Country: India
- Language: Malayalam

Thapaswini is a 1971 Indian Malayalam film, directed by M. Krishnan Nair and produced by P. I. M. Kasim. The film stars Prem Nazir, Sheela, Adoor Bhasi and Jose Prakash in the lead roles. The film had musical score by G. Devarajan.

== Cast ==
- Prem Nazir
- Sheela
- Adoor Bhasi
- Jose Prakash
- Prema
- Sankaradi
- Raghavan
- T. S. Muthaiah
- K. P. Ummer
- Philomina
- Sujatha

== Soundtrack ==
The music was composed by G. Devarajan and the lyrics were written by Vayalar Ramavarma.

No.	Song	Singers	Lyrics	Length (m:ss)
1	"Ambadi Kuyilkkunje"	P. Susheela, P. Madhuri	Vayalar Ramavarma	
2	"Kadalinu Thee Pidikkunnu"	K. J. Yesudas	Vayalar Ramavarma	
3	"Puthrakameshti"	P. Madhuri	Vayalar Ramavarma	
4	"Sarppasundaree Swapnasundaree"	K. J. Yesudas	Vayalar Ramavarma	
