= Vidyarthi (film) =

1968 film by J. Sasikumar

- Directed by: J. Sasikumar
- Written by: K. P. Kottarakkara
- Screenplay by: K. P. Kottarakkara
- Produced by: K. P. Kottarakkara
- Starring: Prem Nazir; Sheela; Jayabharathi; Adoor Bhasi
- Cinematography: C. J. Mohan
- Music by: B. A. Chidambaranath
- Production company: Ganesh Pictures
- Distributed by: Ganesh Pictures
- Release date: 9 March 1968
- Country: India
- Language: Malayalam

Vidyarthi is a 1968 Indian Malayalam-language film, directed by J. Sasikumar and produced by K. P. Kottarakkara. The film stars Prem Nazir, Sheela, Jayabharathi and Adoor Bhasi. The film had musical score by B. A. Chidambaranath.

== Cast ==
- Prem Nazir
- Sheela
- Jayabharathi
- Adoor Bhasi
- Thikkurissy Sukumaran Nair
- Muthukulam Raghavan Pillai
- Prema
- T. R. Omana
- Prathapachandran
- Aranmula Ponnamma
- K. P. Ummer
- Kottayam Chellappan
- Panjabi

== Soundtrack ==
The music was composed by B. A. Chidambaranath and the lyrics were written by Vayalar Ramavarma.

No.	Song	Singers	Lyrics	Length (m:ss)
1	"Heart Weak"	P. Leela, Kamala, Prema	Vayalar Ramavarma	
2	"Ice Cream"	C. O. Anto	Vayalar Ramavarma	
3	"Pachilakkili"	L. R. Eeswari, C. O. Anto	Vayalar Ramavarma	
4	"Sindabad"	Chorus, C. O. Anto	Vayalar Ramavarma	
5	"Thapaswini"	K. J. Yesudas	Vayalar Ramavarma	
6	"Vaarthinkal"	P. Jayachandran, B. Vasantha	Vayalar Ramavarma	
