= Panchavadi =

- Directed by: J. Sasikumar
- Written by: J. Sasikumar; Jagathy NK Achari (dialogues)
- Screenplay by: Jagathy NK Achari
- Produced by: M S Productions
- Starring: Prem Nazir; Vijayasree; Adoor Bhasi; Jose Prakash; T. S. Muthaiah
- Cinematography: TN Krishnankutty Nair
- Music by: M. K. Arjunan
- Production company: MS Productions
- Distributed by: MS Productions
- Release date: 23 February 1973
- Country: India
- Language: Malayalam

Panchavadi is a 1973 Indian Malayalam film, directed by J. Sasikumar and produced by VM Chandi. The film stars Prem Nazir, Vijayasree, Adoor Bhasi, Jose Prakash and T. S. Muthaiah in lead roles. The film had musical score by M. K. Arjunan.

== Cast ==
- Prem Nazir as Sathish
- Vijayasree as Nalini
- Adoor Bhasi as Sadhashivam
- Jose Prakash as Aspashtananda Sawami
- T. S. Muthaiah as Nalini's Father
- Bahadoor as Kesavan Pilla
- K. P. Ummer as Sabu
- Meena as Visalam
- Paravoor Bharathan as Kumar
- Rajakokila as Malini
- Sadhana as Leela
- Vincent as Chandran
- Saroja as Emily
- Kunchan as Constable

== Soundtrack ==
The music was composed by M. K. Arjunan and lyrics was written by Sreekumaran Thampi.

No.	Song	Singers	Lyrics	Length (m:ss)
1	Chirikku Chirikku	P. Susheela, Ambili	Sreekumaran Thampi	
2	Manassinakathoru Paalazhi	K. J. Yesudas, S. Janaki	Sreekumaran Thampi	
3	Nakshathramandala	P. Jayachandran	Sreekumaran Thampi	
4	Poovanipponnum Chingam	K. J. Yesudas	Sreekumaran Thampi	
5	Sooryanum Chandranum	P. Jayachandran	Sreekumaran Thampi	
6	Symphony Symphony	LR Eeswari, Ayiroor Sadasivan	Sreekumaran Thampi	
7	Thiramaalakalude Gaanam	K. J. Yesudas	Sreekumaran Thampi	
