= Paathirapattu =

- Directed by: N. Prakash
- Written by: Jagathy N. K. Achari
- Produced by: N. Prakash
- Starring: Prem Nazir; Sheela; C. R. Lakshmi; G. K. Pillai
- Music by: Vijayabhaskar
- Production company: Movie Crafts
- Distributed by: Movie Crafts
- Release date: 22 December 1967
- Country: India
- Language: Malayalam

Paathirapattu is a 1967 Indian Malayalam-language horror film, directed and produced by N. Prakash. The film stars Prem Nazir, Sheela, C. R. Lakshmi and G. K. Pillai. The film had musical score by Vijayabhaskar. The film is partially adapted from the 1953 Hollywood film House of Wax.

== Cast ==
- Prem Nazir
- Sheela
- C. R. Lakshmi
- G. K. Pillai
- Indira Thampi
- K. P. Ummer
- Mala Aravindan
- Nellikode Bhaskaran
- K. S. Parvathy

== Soundtrack ==
The music was composed by Vijayabhaskar with lyrics by P. Bhaskaran.

No.	Song	Singers	Lyrics	Length (m:ss)
1	"Anuraagakshethrathil"	K. J. Yesudas, B. Vasantha	P. Bhaskaran	
2	"Nizhalaay Ninte Pirake"	S. Janaki	P. Bhaskaran	
3	"Poomalakal"	L. R. Eeswari, Chorus	P. Bhaskaran	
4	"Shokabaashpasagarathil"	B. Vasantha	P. Bhaskaran	
