= Thamburatti =

Thamburaatti
- Directed by: N. Sankaran Nair
- Written by: Thoppil Bhasi
- Screenplay by: Thoppil Bhasi
- Starring: Adoor Bhasi; Prameela; Suresh; Meena
- Cinematography: J. Williams
- Edited by: Ravi
- Music by: G. Devarajan
- Production company: Chithrachaithanya
- Distributed by: Chithrachaithanya
- Release date: 1 September 1978
- Country: India
- Language: Malayalam

Thamburaatti is a 1978 Indian Malayalam film, directed N. Sankaran Nair. The film stars Adoor Bhasi, Prameela, Suresh and Meena in the lead roles. The film has musical score by G. Devarajan.

== Cast ==
- Adoor Bhasi as Thampuran
- Prameela as Ragini Thampuratti
- Suresh as Krishnan, Gopan (double role)
- Meena as Thampuratti's mother
- Prathapachandran as Rema's father
- Reena as Rema, Leela (double role)
- Kaduvakulam Antony as Padmanabha Kurup
- P. R. Menon as Gopan's father
- Vanchiyoor Radha as Rema's mother
- Paul Vengola
- Rajasekharan as Police Officer
- Nagarajan
- Professor Vijayan
- Aravindhakshan
- Ku njiraman
- Sreedharan
- A.M Namboothiri
- Ragava Menon
- J. Lakshmi

== Soundtrack ==
The music was composed by G. Devarajan and the lyrics were written by Kavalam Narayana Panicker.

No.	Song	Singers	Lyrics	Length (m:ss)
1	"Chellamanippoonkuyilukal"	K. J. Yesudas, P. Susheela	Kavalam Narayana Panicker	
2	"Oruvanoruvalil Ullamalinju"	Karthikeyan	Kavalam Narayana Panicker	
3	"Pallava Komala"	P. Madhuri	Kavalam Narayana Panicker	
