= Sindhooram (1976 film) =

- Directed by: Jeassy
- Written by: Dr. Balakrishnan
- Screenplay by: Dr. Balakrishnan
- Starring: Jayabharathi; Sudheer; Vincent; M. G. Soman
- Cinematography: P. S. Nivas
- Edited by: G. Venkittaraman
- Music by: A. T. Ummer
- Production company: Rekha Cine Arts
- Release date: 4 June 1976
- Country: India
- Language: Malayalam

Sindhooram is a 1976 Indian Malayalam film, directed by Jeassy. The film stars Jayabharathi, Sudheer, Vincent and M. G. Soman in the lead roles. The film has musical score by A. T. Ummer.

== Cast ==
- Jayabharathi
- Sudheer
- Vincent
- M. G. Soman
- KPAC Lalitha
- Sankaradi
- Rani Chandra
- Mala Aravindan
- Mallika Sukumaran

== Soundtrack ==
The music was composed by A. T. Ummer and the lyrics were written by Appan Thacheth, Sathyan Anthikkad, Bharanikkavu Sivakumar, Konniyoor Bhas and Sasikala Menon.

No.	Song	Singers	Lyrics	Length (m:ss)
1	"Kaanchanathaarakal"	K. J. Yesudas	Appan Thacheth	
2	"Oru Nimisham Tharoo"	K. J. Yesudas	Sathyan Anthikkad	
3	"Sindorapushpavana Chakoram"	S. Janaki	Bharanikkavu Sivakumar	
4	"Vaishaakha Yamini"	K. J. Yesudas	Konniyoor Bhas	
5	"Yadukula Maadhava"	Sreelatha Namboothiri	Sasikala Menon	
