= Kayalkkarayil =

- Directed by: N. Prakash
- Written by: Jagathy N. K. Achari
- Screenplay by: Jagathy N. K. Achari
- Produced by: N. Prakash
- Starring: Prem Nazir; Sheela; Jayabharathi; Adoor Bhasi
- Cinematography: N. Prakash
- Edited by: B. S. Mani
- Music by: Vijayabhaskar
- Production company: Movie Crafts
- Distributed by: Thirumeni Pictures
- Release date: 19 December 1968
- Country: India
- Language: Malayalam

Kayalkkarayil is a 1968 Indian Malayalam-language film directed and produced by N. Prakash. The film stars Prem Nazir, Sheela, Jayabharathi and Adoor Bhasi in the lead roles. The film has musical score by Vijayabhaskar.

== Cast ==
- Prem Nazir
- Sheela
- Jayabharathi
- Adoor Bhasi
- P. J. Antony
- Raghavan
- G. K. Pillai
- K. P. Ummer

== Soundtrack ==
The music was composed by Vijayabhaskar and the lyrics were written by P. Bhaskaran.

No.	Song	Singers	Lyrics	Length (m:ss)
1	"Devan Thannathu"	K. J. Yesudas, S. Janaki	P. Bhaskaran	
2	"Devatha Njaan"	K. J. Yesudas, P. Susheela	P. Bhaskaran	
3	"Neelamukile Ninnude"	P. Susheela	P. Bhaskaran	
4	"Paayunna Nimisham"	L. R. Eeswari	P. Bhaskaran	
