= Kilippattu (film) =

Indian film

- Directed by: Raghavan
- Written by: K. M. Raghavan Nambiar; Raghavan (dialogues)
- Screenplay by: Raghavan
- Starring: Adoor Bhasi; Nedumudi Venu; Menaka; Sukumaran
- Cinematography: Vipin Das
- Music by: M. B. Sreenivasan
- Production company: Revathichithra
- Distributed by: Revathichithra
- Release date: 25 June 1987
- Country: India
- Language: Malayalam

Kilippattu is a 1987 Indian Malayalam film, directed by Raghavan. The film stars Adoor Bhasi, Nedumudi Venu, Menaka and Sukumaran in the lead roles. It features a musical score by M. B. Sreenivasan.

The film marked the screen debut of Raghavan's son, Jishnu Raghavan, who appeared as a child artist, and was Menaka's 100th Malayalam film as a lead actress. Following her marriage to producer G. Suresh Kumar later that year, she retired from acting.

== Cast ==
- Sukumaran
- K. P. Ummer
- Nedumudi Venu
- Balan K. Nair
- Adoor Bhasi
- Menaka
- Sabitha Anand
- Jishnu Raghavan

== Soundtrack ==
The music was composed by M. B. Sreenivasan and the lyrics were written by K. M. Raghavan Nambiar.

| No. | Song | Singers | Lyrics | Length (m:ss) |
|---|---|---|---|---|
| 1 | "Aarodum Parayaruthe" | K. J. Yesudas | K. M. Raghavan Nambiar | |
| 2 | "Aattavum Paattum" | C. O. Anto, Latha Raju, Malathi | K. M. Raghavan Nambiar | |
| 3 | "Panchavarnnakkili" | K. J. Yesudas | K. M. Raghavan Nambiar | |
| 4 | "Raavil Unarnnu" | K. J. Yesudas | K. M. Raghavan Nambiar | |
