= Bhaarya Illaatha Raathri =

1975 film

- Directed by: Babu Nanthankode
- Written by: Sreekumaran Thampi
- Screenplay by: Sreekumaran Thampi
- Produced by: P. Subramaniam
- Starring: Thikkurissy Sukumaran Nair; Hari; Raghavan; KPAC Sunny
- Edited by: N. Gopalakrishnan
- Music by: G. Devarajan
- Production company: Neela
- Distributed by: Neela
- Release date: 16 May 1975
- Country: India
- Language: Malayalam

Bhaarya Illaatha Raathri is a 1975 Indian Malayalam-language film directed by Babu Nanthankode and produced by P. Subramaniam. The film stars Thikkurissy Sukumaran Nair, Hari, Raghavan and KPAC Sunny. The film has musical score by G. Devarajan.

== Cast ==
- Raghavan
- Thikkurissy Sukumaran Nair
- Hari
- KPAC Sunny
- Kunchan
- Paravoor Bharathan
- Ramachandran Nair
- Sripriya
- Udayachandrika

== Soundtrack ==
The music was composed by G. Devarajan and the lyrics were written by Sreekumaran Thampi.

No.	Song	Singers	Lyrics	Length (m:ss)
1	"Abhilaashamohini"	P. Madhuri, Srikanth	Sreekumaran Thampi	
2	"Ee Divyasnehathin"	P. Madhuri	Sreekumaran Thampi	
3	"Raathrithan Sakhi Njan"	P. Madhuri	Sreekumaran Thampi	
4	"Sangeetham Thulumbum"	P. Madhuri	Sreekumaran Thampi	
5	"Thaarunyathin Pushpakireedam"	K. J. Yesudas	Sreekumaran Thampi	
