= Evidence (1988 film) =

- Directed by: Raghavan
- Produced by: RR Creations
- Starring: Shankar; Seema; Radha Ravi; Vani Viswanath
- Cinematography: K.Ramachandrababu
- Music by: Krishnathej
- Release date: 1988
- Country: India
- Language: Malayalam

Evidence (announced as Puthumazhatthullikal) is a 1988 Indian Malayalam-language film directed by actor Raghavan, starring Seema and Shankar. The film is the remake of the Tamil film Udhaya Geetham.

== Cast ==
- Shankar as Prince
- Seema as Alphonsa John Jacob
- Vani Viswanath as Dalia
- Raghavan as Father Dominic
- Sudheer as Thomas
- Vincent as Asst. Jail Superintendent
- Radha Ravi as Rajashekhar
- Captain Raju as Damu
- Adoor Bhasi as Advocate Chidambaram
- Prathapachandran as John Jacob
- Janardanan as D I G
- P. Sreekumar as Sharath
- Bobby Kottarakkara as a convict
- M Chandran Nair
- K.G. Menon
- Sugandhi
