= Velutha Kathreena =

- Directed by: J. Sasikumar
- Written by: Muttathu Varkey
- Screenplay by: Muttathu Varkey
- Produced by: P. Balthasar
- Starring: Prem Nazir; Sathyan; Sheela; Jayabharathi
- Cinematography: E. N. Balakrishnan
- Edited by: T. R. Sreenivasalu
- Music by: G. Devarajan
- Production company: Navajeevan Films
- Distributed by: Navajeevan Films
- Release date: 29 November 1968
- Country: India
- Language: Malayalam

Velutha Kathreena is a 1968 Indian Malayalam-language film directed by J. Sasikumar and produced by P. Balthasar, based on a novel of the same name, written by Muttathu Varkey. The film stars Prem Nazir, Sathyan, Sheela and Jayabharathi in the lead roles. The film has musical score by G. Devarajan.

== Cast ==
- Prem Nazir as Thirumeni
- Sathyan as Chellappan
- Sheela as Kathreena
- Jayabharathi as Rosa
- Kaviyoor Ponnamma as Marthappulayi
- Adoor Bhasi as Kurayachan
- Jose Prakash as Manoharan
- Manavalan Joseph as Krishnappanikkar
- T. R. Omana as Dr.Sainabha
- T. S. Muthaiah as Thevan
- Kumari Padmini
- Khadeeja
- Aravindan as Madhavan
- Bahadoor as Appayi
- Mala Shantha as Lakshmikkutti
- Meena as Meriyamma
- Panjabi as Maniyappan
- Shailasree as Narthaki
- Parvathy
- Leela

== Soundtrack ==
The music was composed by G. Devarajan and the lyrics were written by Sreekumaran Thampi. The violin trio of L. Subramaniam, L. Shankar, and L. Vaidyanathan played the instrument in the song "Kattuchembakam Poothulayumbol" and sitarist Janardhan Mitta's sitar is heard in "Prabhaatham Vidarum".

No.	Song	Singers	Lyrics	Length (m:ss)
1	"Kaattuchembakam"	A. M. Rajah	Sreekumaran Thampi	
2	"Kannil Kaamabanam"	L. R. Eeswari	Sreekumaran Thampi	
3	"Makaram Poyittum"	P. Susheela, P. Jayachandran	Sreekumaran Thampi	
4	"Onnaam Kandathil"	P. Leela, P. B. Sreenivas	Sreekumaran Thampi	
5	"Panineerkkaattin"	P. Susheela	Sreekumaran Thampi	
6	"Pooja Pushpame"	K. J. Yesudas	Sreekumaran Thampi	
7	"Prabhaatham Vidarum"	K. J. Yesudas	Sreekumaran Thampi	
