= Chandra Bimbam =

- Directed by: N. Sankaran Nair
- Written by: Ravi Vilangan (dialogues); Vijayan Karote (dialogues)
- Starring: Jayabharathi; Prathap Pothen; Sathar; M. G. Soman
- Edited by: Balakrishnan
- Music by: Shankar–Ganesh
- Release date: 25 April 1980
- Country: India
- Language: Malayalam

Chandra Bimbam is a 1980 Indian Malayalam language film, directed by N. Sankaran Nair. The film stars Jayabharathi, Prathap Pothen, Sathar and M. G. Soman. The film has musical score by Shankar–Ganesh.

== Cast ==
- Jayabharathi
- Prathap Pothen
- Sathaar
- M. G. Soman
- M. N. Nambiar

== Soundtrack ==
The music was composed by Shankar–Ganesh and the lyrics were written by Ravi Vilangan.

No.	Song	Singers	Lyrics	Length (m:ss)
1	"Advaithaamritha Varshini"	Vani Jairam	Ravi Vilangan	
2	"Manjilkkulichu Nilkkum"	K. J. Yesudas	Ravi Vilangan	
3	"Manushyan"	K. J. Yesudas	Ravi Vilangan	
4	"Nee Manassaay"	S. P. Balasubrahmanyam	Ravi Vilangan	
