= Avar Unarunnu =

- Poster
- Directed by: N. Sankaran Nair
- Written by: Muthukulam Raghavan Pilla (story, dialogue); K.P. Kottarakara (dialogue)
- Screenplay by: Muthukulam Raghavan Pilla
- Produced by: G. Govindapillai
- Starring: Prem Nazir; Miss Kumari
- Cinematography: P. B. Mani
- Edited by: K. D. George
- Music by: V. Dakshinamoorthy (music); Pala Narayanan Nair, Vayalar Rama Varma (lyrics)
- Production company: Prasanna Pictures
- Release date: 16 November 1956
- Country: India
- Language: Malayalam

Avar Unarunnu (transl. They Wake Up) is a 1956 Indian Malayalam-language film, directed by N. Sankaran Nair and produced by G. Govindapillai. The film stars Prem Nazir and Miss Kumari. It also stars Sathyan and Bahadoor. The lyrics were written by Pala Narayanan Nair and Vayalar Rama Varma. The musical score was by V. Dakshinamoorthy.

== Plot ==
Kamalamma's two sons, Madhavan and Leela, were separated by terrible waves on the beach where they were staying. Bhasi, the son of Thampi's son Ravi, a farmer, and Kunchupillai, both classmates. After his education, Ravi became the owner of a large factory.

The boss, Ravi, became a womanizer and an alcoholic. For all this mischief, the driver, the steward, the politician, the labor leader, the bush, and the kitchen worker, Nani, stood by. Ravi, who was keeping an eye on Leela, learned from Nani that she was also in love with Bhasi. Ravi forbade Bhasi from entering Thampi's bungalow or surroundings. He had a mother who gave silent permission to all of Ravi's misdeeds and made Leela suffer - Bharathi. Madhavan, who had been wandering around in pain since Leela's disappearance, joined Ravi's factory as an employee. In time, they became husband and wife. Madhavan organized the workers of the factory and rallied against the malpractices and oppression of the boss. Madhavan stirred Bhasi to organize against Thampi for his cruel treatment of the peasants. But Madhavan's advice was not effective because of Kunchupillai's forced opposition and Bhasi's unfounded attachment to her landlord.

Thampi had to deal with Kunchupillai due to some problem. Thampi exhibited the true form of feudalism. Kunchupilla was executed. This incident caused a great deal of change in Bhasi. Madhavan really used this. Lakshmi advised her son to fight fiercely against injustice and violence. The revolutionary spirit of Bhasi, a peasant laborer, was shaken.

Leela was severely hurt by Bharathi's cruel behavior and fear of violence from Ravi. She left the house on her own. Ravi followed her and locked her in a room.

Bhasi grows up to save Leela, whom he loves dearly. He also decides to avenge the murder of his father. Madhavan came to the aid of Bhasi. Factory workers and agricultural workers woke up together. They joined hands against injustice and violence.

Madhavan and Ravi clashed. Madhavan was shot during a confrontation between them. Bhasi Madhavan was shot with Leela and ran to the spot. Only then did Madhavan see the mark on Leela's wrist and realize that she was his lost sister. He burst into tears of joy. Ravi and his accomplices fell into the strong hands of the law, accusing Kunchupillai of murder.

== Cast ==
- Prem Nazir
- Miss Kumari
- Sathyan
- Prema
- Aranmula Ponnamma
- Bahadoor
- Kambissery Karunakaran
- Kuttan Pillai
- Chengannur Janaki
- Miss Renuka Devi

== Music ==
All music is composed by V. Dakshinamoorthy.

No.	Title	Lyrics	Artist(s)	Length
1.	"Alolathirayadi"	Pala Narayanan Nair	Chorus
2.	"Aromalkunje"	Pala Narayanan Nair	Sharda
3.	"Ariyamo Choranu"	Pala Narayanan Nair	Kamukara Purushothaman
4.	"En Manasame"	Pala Narayanan Nair	Kamukara Purushothaman, Shyamala
5.	"Ethu Ghivitham Than"	Pala Narayanan Nair	Shyamala
6.	"Kizhakkuninnoru Pennu Vannu"	Vayalar Rama Varma	Jiki, Chorus
7.	"Maninellin Kathiradi"	Pala Narayanan Nair	Chorus
8.	"Maveli Nattile"	Pala Narayanan Nair	L. P. R. Verma
9.	"Munnettam Pranayam Krishithane"	Pala Narayanan Nair	-
10.	"Oru Kattum Kattalla"	Vayalar Rama Varma	AM Raja, Jiki
11.	"Oru Mullapanthil"	Pala Narayanan Nair	Padmini Priyadarshini
12.	"Paloli Poonila"	Pala Narayanan Nair	L. P. R. Verma, Lalitha Thampi
13.	"Puthughivitha ha kamitam"	Pala Narayanan Nair	Kamukara Purushothaman, Lalitha Thampi
