= Keni (film) =

- Directed by: J. Sasikumar
- Screenplay by: Reetha
- Dialogues by: Vijayan Karote; Jagathy N. K. Achary
- Produced by: Prem Navas
- Starring: K. R. Vijaya; Prem Nazir; Bahadoor; K. P. A. C. Azeez
- Cinematography: Melli Irani
- Edited by: M. S. Mani
- Music by: G. Devarajan
- Production company: Reetha International
- Distributed by: Reetha International
- Release date: 3 December 1982
- Country: India
- Language: Malayalam

Keni (transl. Trap) is a 1982 Indian Malayalam-language film, directed by J. Sasikumar and produced by Prem Navas. The film stars K. R. Vijaya, Prem Nazir, Bahadoor and K. P. A. C. Azeez . The film has musical score by G. Devarajan.

== Cast ==
- K. R. Vijaya as Nirmala Rajendran
- Prem Nazir as Rajendran
- Bahadoor as Pravachambalam Prabhakaran Nair
- KPAC Azeez as Jaffar
- Sathaar as Chandran
- Shubha as Rajani
- Adoor Bhasi as Girija Vallabha Menon
- Mammootty as Babu
- Renuchandra as Beena
- Janardanan as Madhusoodanan
- KPAC Sunny as Thamburaan
- Ramu as Ravi

== Soundtrack ==
The music was composed by G. Devarajan and the lyrics were written by Perumpuzha Gopalakrishnan.

No.	Song	Singers	Lyrics	Length (m:ss)
1	"Daivamonnu Ammayonnu"	P. Susheela, K. R. Vijaya	Perumpuzha Gopalakrishnan	
2	"Kadalinakkare Ninnum"	P. Madhuri, Dr. Bharadwaj	Perumpuzha Gopalakrishnan	
3	"Mazhavilkkodiyum Tholilenthi"	K. J. Yesudas	Perumpuzha Gopalakrishnan	
