= Muttathu Varkey =

Indian writer

- Born: 28 April 1913; Chethipuzha, Changanassery, Kottayam, Kerala, India
- Died: 28 May 1989 (aged 76)
- Occupations: Novelist, poet
- Notable work: Oru Kudayum Kunjupengalum; Paadaatha Painkili; Azhakulla Seleena; Mayiladum Kunnu
- Website: muttathuvarkey.com

Muttathu Varkey (28 April 1913 – 28 May 1989) was an Indian Malayalam-language novelist, short story writer, and poet. He was best known in Malayalam literature for the painkili (janapriya) genre—a style of sentiment-filled romantic fiction named after his famous novel Padatha Painkili, which was later released as a film.

== Life ==
Varkey was born in Chethipuzha, a small village near Changanassery in Kottayam district, Kerala. He completed his pre degree and degree from SB College Changanasserry, he began his career as a school teacher at Saint Berchmans High School, Changanassery. He then took up the job of an accountant in a timber factory. For a brief period, Varkey taught in a Tutorial College run by M. P. Paul. He then joined Deepika newspaper as an associated editor and remained there for next 26 years until his retirement in 1974.

== Literary career ==
Muttathu Varkey emerged as one of the popular writers of Malayalam fiction. He along with Kanam EJ was prominent in popularizing a genre of sentiment-filled pulp fiction known as painkili novel in Malayalam literature. He was a prolific writer and has penned a total of 132 books, including 65 novels. The rest of his works include collections of short stories, plays, and poetry. Many of his novels were adapted into Malayalam films, including the Prem Nazir starrer Padatha Painkili (1957), Inapravukal (1965), Velutha Kathreena (1968), Mayiladum Kunnu (1972) and the Sathyan starrer Karakanakadal (1971).

== Selected works ==
- Paadaatha Painkili
- Oru Kudayum Kunjupengalum
- Inapravukal
- Karakanakkadal
- Mayiladum Kunnu
- Velutha Kathreena
- Akkarappacha
- Azhakulla Selina
- Pattuthoovaala
- Mriyakutty

== Filmography ==
- Padatha Painkili (1957)
- Inapravukal (1965)
- Velutha Kathreena (1968)
- Mayiladum Kunnu (1972)
- Azhakulla Saleena (1973)
- Karakanakadal (1971)
- Kottayam Kunjachan (1990)

== Muttathu Varkey Award ==
Muttathu Varkey Foundation has instituted the Muttathu Varkey Award to be presented yearly to Malayalm writers. The winner is selected by popular vote with final decisions made by prominent judges. The prominent winners of the award include, O. V. Vijayan (1992), Vaikom Muhammad Basheer (1993), M. T. Vasudevan Nair (1994), Kovilan (1995), Kakkanadan (1996), VKN (1997), M. Mukundan (1998), Punathil Kunhabdulla (1999), Anand (2000), N. P. Mohammed (2001), Ponkunnam Varkey (2002), Sethu (2003), C. Radhakrishnan (2004), Zacharia (2005), Kamala Surayya (2006), T. Padmanabhan (2007), M. Sukumaran (2008), N.S. Madhavan (2009), P. Valsala (2010), Sarah Joseph (2011), N Prabhakaran (2012) C. V. Balakrishnan (2013), Asokan Charuvil (2014), K. Satchidanandan (2015), K. G. George (2016), T. V. Chandran (2017), K. R. Meera (2018) and Benyamin (2019)

== See also ==
- List of Malayalam-language authors by category
- List of Malayalam-language authors
