= Vishnu Vijayam =

- Poster
- Directed by: N. Sankaran Nair
- Written by: V. T. Nandakumar
- Screenplay by: V. T. Nandakumar
- Produced by: A. G. Abraham
- Starring: Kamal Haasan; Sheela; Thikkurissy Sukumaran Nair; Ambareesh; M. O. Devasya
- Cinematography: J. Williams
- Edited by: K. B. Singh
- Music by: G. Devarajan
- Production company: Samarias
- Distributed by: Samarias
- Release date: 25 October 1974
- Running time: 152 minutes
- Country: India
- Language: Malayalam

Vishnu Vijayam (transl. Triumph of Vishnu) is a 1974 Indian Malayalam-language film, directed by N. Sankaran Nair and produced by A. G. Abraham. The film stars Kamal Haasan, Sheela, Thikkurissy Sukumaran Nair and M. O. Devasya. The film has musical score by G. Devarajan.

J. Williams made his debut as an independent cameraman with this film. Vishnu Vijayam was dubbed in Telugu as Prema Poojari.

== Plot ==
Vishnu Vijayam, made in black and white is about a girl who is chased a boy who is engaged by her former lover to take a photograph of her extramarital affair to get money. This she gets to know in the end.

== Cast ==
- Kamal Haasan as Vishnu
- Sheela as Leela
- Ambareesh as John
- Thikkurissy Sukumaran Nair as Kariachan
- M. O. Devasya
- Alummoodan as Chacko
- Girija
- Paravoor Bharathan as Unni's friend

== Soundtrack ==
The music was composed by G. Devarajan and the lyrics were written by Vayalar Ramavarma.

No.	Song	Singers	Lyrics	Length (m:ss)
1	"Enne Nin Kannukal"	P. Madhuri	Vayalar Ramavarma	
2	"Garuda Panchami"	P. Madhuri	Vayalar Ramavarma	
3	"Pushpadalangalal"	K. J. Yesudas	Vayalar Ramavarma	

== Release and reception ==
Vishnu Vijayam was released on 25 October 1974. The film went on to become a blockbuster. The film was dubbed Telugu-language as Prema Poojari and released on 8 December 1978.
