= Appan Thacheth =

Indian lyricist

- Born: Thacheth Neelakanta Menon; 10 November 1937; Elamkulam, Kingdom of Cochin
- Died: 2 July 2011 (aged 73); Pukkattupadi, Cochin, India
- Education: Bachelor of Arts; Diploma in Business Management
- Occupations: Poet, lyricist, engineer
- Writing career
- Language: Malayalam

Thacheth Neelakanta Menon, better known as Appan Thacheth (10 November 1937 – 2 July 2011), was a Malayalam-language poet and lyricist from Kerala, India.

Thacheth was born in 1937 in Elamkulam, Cochin, as the son of Kandaveli Achuthan Pillai and Elamkulam Thacheth Nanikutty Amma. His pen-name was made by mixing his nickname, Appan, and his family name, Thacheth. After completing his bachelor's degree in Arts and diploma in business management, he joined Larson and Toubro in Madras. He worked at the Madras Atomic Power Station, Abu Dhabi International Airport and Lotus Temple in Delhi. He also worked in Calcutta and Germany. He retired as Senior Quality Control Engineer in 1998. He published over 50 collections of poems. Some of his works include Poopalika (1963), Apsarassukal (1965), Udayasthamayangal (1966), Nirangal Nizhalukal (1979), Ekakiyude Veena (1987), Ninne Kurichu Veendum (1988), Gopurathile Kuruvi (1989) and Kaliveedu (1989). He penned the lyrics for around ten Malayalam films, including Sindooram (1976), Rajaankanam (1976), Rajaparambara (1977), Beena (1978), Mookkilla Rajyathu Murimookkan Rajavu (1996), Varavaay (2000) and Randu Penkuttikal (2002). "Devi Nin Chiriyil" from Rajaparambara is one of his most famous songs.

Thacheth died on 2 July 2011 at his residence in Pukkattupadi near Cochin. He was survived by his wife, two sons and a daughter.
