= Rajaparambara =

- Directed by: Dr. Balakrishnan
- Written by: Dr. Balakrishnan
- Screenplay by: Dr. Balakrishnan
- Produced by: M. P. Bhaskaran
- Starring: Vincent; Sudheer; Raghavan; Jayan; Jayabharathi; Jose Prakash; Shobha
- Cinematography: P. S. Nivas
- Edited by: G. Venkittaraman
- Music by: A. T. Ummer
- Production company: Balabhaskar Films
- Distributed by: Balabhaskar Films
- Release date: 11 March 1977
- Country: India
- Language: Malayalam

Rajaparambara is a 1977 Indian Malayalam film, written and directed by Dr. Balakrishnan and produced by M. P. Bhaskaran. The film stars Vincent, Sudheer, Jayan, Jayabharathi, Jose Prakash and Shobha in the lead roles. A. T. Ummer composed the music.

== Cast ==
- Vincent
- Sudheer
- Raghavan
- Jayan
- Jayabharathi
- Jose Prakash
- Shobha
- Kuthiravattam Pappu
- Reena

== Soundtrack ==
The music was composed by A. T. Ummer and the lyrics were written by Appan Thacheth, Bharanikkavu Sivakumar and Bichu Thirumala.

No.	Song	Singers	Lyrics	Length (m:ss)
1	"Devi Nin Chiriyil"	K. J. Yesudas	Appan Thacheth	
2	"Prapanjapathma Dalangal"	K. J. Yesudas	Bharanikkavu Sivakumar	
3	"Snehikkaan Padhichoru"	S. Janaki	Bharanikkavu Sivakumar	
4	"Viswam Chamachum"	Sujatha Mohan, Chorus	Bichu Thirumala	
