= Jagathy N. K. Achary =

Indian dramatist and writer

- Malayalam Screenwriter Jagathy NK Achary in a cameo role in the film Deshadanakkili Karayarilla
- Born: 1924; Jagathy, Trivandrum, Travancore, present day India
- Died: 1997 (aged 72–73)
- Occupations: Dramatist, writer, actor, screenwriter
- Years active: 1950–1997
- Style: Satire, mythic fiction, whimsical, thrillers, horror, speculative
- Spouse: Prasanna
- Children: Jagathy Sreekumar; Krishnakumar; Jameela

Jagathy N. K. Achary (1924–1997) was an Indian dramatist and writer who predominantly worked in Malayalam films and theatre. He was known for his plays and screenplays. He is the father of actor Jagathy Sreekumar.

== Early and personal life ==
Jagathy N. Kochukrishnan Achary was born in 1924 at Krishnavilasam in Jagathy, Trivandrum, then capital of Travancore, to "Ananthapadmanabhan" Nanu Achary and Ponnammal. He had his education in Thiruvananthapuram and Scott Christian College, Nagercoil. After obtaining a BA in literature, he followed up with a degree in law.

Kochukrishnan's paternal ancestors were involved in the construction works of many palaces and stately mansions in Travancore built during the latter half of the nineteenth century. His grandfather Krishnan Achari and his brother were given land to settle down in Jagathy. N. K. Kochukrishnan's father was Kottaram Moothchari under Moolam Thirunal and Chithira Thirunal Balarama Varma of erstwhile Travancore.

He was married to Prasanna (Ponnamma) from Edavanacaud had three children: Jagathy Sreekumar, P. K. Krishnakumar and P. K. Jameela.

== Death ==
He died of old age diseases in 1997 at his Thiruvananthapuram residence. A road in Cotton Hill, Vazhuthacaud, Thiruvananthapuram is named after him.

== Education and career ==
He started his career as an employee at the palace. Later, he joined the All India Radio as a staff artist where he worked as a programme executive at various stations and subsequently rose to the position of Station Director.

Kochukrishnan wrote many plays for the radio, crossing over to writing more than twenty plays for professional theatre, and subsequently films. Many of his screenplays were published and enacted by amateur theatre groups all over Kerala. His first work was in Vimal Kumar's Achanum Makanum in the year 1957, followed by Ummini Thanka in 1961 and Velu Thambi Dalawa in 1962.

He was a partner of the Kalanilayam Theatre group, for which he wrote many plays. During the 1960s-70s, Kalanilayam revolutionised Malayalam theatre, with its dramas like Raktharakshass, Kayamkulam Kochunni, Kadamattathu Kathanar, Iravikkodu Pillai, Naradan Keralathil, Taj Mahal, Sree Guruvayoorappan and Alavudinum Athbhuthavilakkum, all simultaneously with his illustrious career in films. He was closely associated with directors such as K. G. George and Padmarajan; starting a drama school with the former in the 1980s and appearing in cameo roles in the later's films such as Moonnam Pakkam and Desatanakkili Karayarilla. Other published plays include Podikkai,Karakku Company,Noorjahan,Lahari, Podikkai,Japan Daivam etc.

He is a recipient of the Kerala Sangeetha Nataka Akademi Award (1983) and the Kerala Sangeetha Nataka Akademi Fellowship (1991).

== Film career ==
Kochukrishnan penned story, screenplay and dialogues for more than 33 Malayalam movies and also experimental films such as Sexilla Stundilla, Paathirapattu etc. He also wrote films with strong female characters in the 60s and 70s.

== Filmography ==
=== As screenwriter ===
Year	Title	Credited as	Director
1957	Achanum Makanum	Yes	Vimal Kumar
1961	Ummini Thanka	Yes	G. Vishwanath
1962	Laila Majnu	Yes	P. Bhaskaran
1962	Velu Thambi Dalawa	Yes	G. Vishwanath
1962	Bhagyajathakam	Screenplay, dialogue	P. Bhaskaran
1966	Kayamkulam Kochunni	Dialogue	P. A. Thomas
1967	Postman	Screenplay, dialogue	P. A. Thomas
1967	Paathirapattu	Yes	N. Prakash
1967	Madatharuvi	Yes	P. A. Thomas
1968	Kayalkkarayil	Yes	N. Prakash
1968	Anchu Sundarikal	Yes	M. Krishnan Nair
1968	Kodungallooramma	Yes	Kunchacko
1971	Sumangali	Yes	M.K Ramu
1971	Thapaswini	Yes	M. Krishnan Nair
1972	Sakthi	Yes	Crossbelt Mani
1973	Panchavadi	Screenplay, dialogue	J. Sasikumar
1973	Manissu	Screenplay, dialogue	Hameed Kakkassery
1973	Poymughangal	Yes	B. N. Prakash
1973	Divyadharsanam	Yes	J. Sasikumar
1975	Ullasa Yaathra	Yes	A. B. Raj
1975	Kottaaram Vilkkaanundu	Yes	K Sukumaran
1976	Sexilla Stundilla	Screenplay, dialogue	B. N. Prakash
1976	Swimming Pool	Yes	J. Sasikumar
1976	Kenalum Collectorum	Yes	M. M. Nesan
1977	Sreedevi	Yes	N. Sankaran Nair
1977	Penpuli	Yes	Crossbelt Mani
1977	Kaavilamma	Yes	N. Sankaran Nair
1978	Snehikkan Samayamilla	Yes	Viayanand
1979	Kalliyankattu Neeli	Yes	M. Krishnan Nair
1982	Keni	Dialogue	J. Sasikumar
1982	Aa Divasam	Screenplay, dialogue	M. Mani
1986	Karinagam	Yes	K. S. Gopalakrishnan
1988	Inquilabinte Puthri	Yes	Jayadevan

=== As actor ===
Year	Title	Role	Notes
1982	Anuraagakkodathi	Professor	
1986	Deshadanakkili Karayarilla		
1988	Moonnam Pakkam	Thampi's friend	
1989	Najangalude Kochu Doctor		
