= Azhakulla Saleena =

Malayalam movie

- Directed by: K. S. Sethumadhavan
- Written by: Muttathu Varkey; Thoppil Bhasi (dialogues)
- Screenplay by: Thoppil Bhasi
- Produced by: K. S. R. Moorthy
- Starring: Prem Nazir; Jayabharathi; Kanchana; Vincent
- Cinematography: Masthan
- Edited by: T. R. Sreenivasalu
- Music by: K. J. Yesudas
- Production company: Chithrakalakendram
- Distributed by: Chithrakalakendram
- Release date: 19 October 1973
- Country: India
- Language: Malayalam

Azhakulla Saleena is a 1973 Indian Malayalam-language film, based on the novel of the same name by Muttathu Varkey, directed by K. S. Sethumadhavan and produced by K. S. R. Moorthy. The film stars Prem Nazir, Jayabharathi, Kanchana and Vincent in the lead roles. The film had musical score by K. J. Yesudas. The film is best known for the performance by Prem Nazir in a negative role.

== Cast ==
- Prem Nazir as Kunjachan
- Jayabharathi as Saleena
- Kanchana as Lucyamma
- Vincent as Johnny
- KPAC Lalitha as Mary
- Sankaradi as Agausthi
- Sreelatha Namboothiri as Tribal Girl
- T. R. Omana as Chinnamma
- Baby Sumathi as Sajan
- Bahadoor as Diamond Mathai
- Changanacherry Thankam
- Kavitha
- Pala Thankam
- Ramadas as Avarachan
- S. P. Pillai as Paappi
- Vanchiyoor Radha
- Santo Krishnan as Police Constable
- Abbas
- Ramadas as Awarachan
- K. A. Vasudevan

== Soundtrack ==
The songs were composed by K. J. Yesudas and the lyrics were written by Vayalar Ramavarma and Father Nagel. Background Music was composed by M. B. Sreenivasan

No.	Song	Singers	Lyrics	Length (m:ss)
1	"Darling Darling"	K. J. Yesudas	Vayalar Ramavarma	
2	"Ividathe Chechikku"	Latha Raju	Vayalar Ramavarma	
3	"Kaalameghathoppi Vecha"	S. Janaki	Vayalar Ramavarma	
4	"Maraalike Maraalike"	K. J. Yesudas	Vayalar Ramavarma	
5	"Pushpagandhi"	K. J. Yesudas, B. Vasantha	Vayalar Ramavarma	
6	"Snehathin Idayanaam"	P. Leela	Father Nagel	
7	"Tajmahal Nirmicha"	P. Susheela	Vayalar Ramavarma	
