= Poymughangal =

- Poster
- Directed by: B. N. Prakash
- Screenplay by: Jagathy N. K. Achary
- Produced by: T. K. Balachandran
- Starring: Prem Nazir; Jayabharathi; Adoor Bhasi; Sreelatha Namboothiri
- Cinematography: B. N. Prakash
- Edited by: K. Narayanan
- Music by: V. Dakshinamoorthy
- Release date: 25 October 1973
- Country: India
- Language: Malayalam

Poymughangal (lit. 'Masks') is a 1973 Indian Malayalam-language film directed by B. N. Prakash and produced by T. K. Balachandran. It stars Prem Nazir, Jayabharathi, Adoor Bhasi and Sreelatha Namboothiri. The film's score was composed by V. Dakshinamoorthy.

== Cast ==
- Prem Nazir
- Jayabharathi
- Adoor Bhasi
- Sreelatha Namboothiri
- T. S. Muthaiah
- Bahadoor
- N. Govindankutty
- Pala Thankam
- Paravoor Bharathan
- T. K. Balachandran

== Soundtrack ==
The music was composed by V. Dakshinamoorthy with lyrics written by P. Bhaskaran.

| No. | Song | Singers | Lyrics | Length (m:ss) |
|---|---|---|---|---|
| 1 | "Aayiram Pookkal Viriyatte" | P. Jayachandran | P. Bhaskaran | |
| 2 | "Abhinavajeevitha" | S. Janaki | P. Bhaskaran | |
| 3 | "Amme Amme Ellam" | S. Janaki | P. Bhaskaran | |
| 4 | "Chundathe Punchiri" | K. J. Yesudas | P. Bhaskaran | |
| 5 | "Manmadha Mandirathil" | K. P. Brahmanandan | P. Bhaskaran | |
