= Romeo (1976 film) =

- Directed by: S. S. Nair
- Written by: Kallada Vasudevan
- Screenplay by: Kallada Vasudevan
- Starring: Sheela; Kaviyoor Ponnamma; Thikkurissy Sukumaran Nair; Bahadoor
- Cinematography: R. N. Pillai
- Edited by: V. P. Krishnan
- Music by: G. Devarajan
- Production company: Jeevan Pictures
- Distributed by: Jeevan Pictures
- Release date: 30 July 1976
- Country: India
- Language: Malayalam

Romeo is a 1976 Indian Malayalam-language film, directed by S. S. Nair. The film stars Sheela, Kaviyoor Ponnamma, Thikkurissy Sukumaran Nair and Bahadoor. The film has musical score by G. Devarajan.

== Cast ==
- Sheela
- Kaviyoor Ponnamma
- Thikkurissy Sukumaran Nair
- Bahadoor
- Jayasudha
- M. G. Soman
- Murali
- Radhamani
- Ravikumar

== Soundtrack ==
The music was composed by G. Devarajan and the lyrics were written by Vayalar.

No.	Song	Singers	Lyrics	Length (m:ss)
1	"Chaarulathe"	K. J. Yesudas	Vayalar	
2	"Kaalathe Manju Kondu"	P. Madhuri	Vayalar	
3	"Mrigaangabimbamudichu"	Srikanth	Vayalar	
4	"Night is Young"	P. Madhuri	Vayalar	
5	"Pushpolsavappanthalil"	Sreekanth	Vayalar	
6	"Swimming Pool"	P. Madhuri	Vayalar	
