= Paalkkadal =

- Directed by: T. K. Prasad
- Written by: C. Radhakrishnan
- Produced by: N. M. Sankaran Nair & K. K. S. Kaimal
- Starring: Sheela; Sharada; Mohan Sharma; Prema
- Music by: A. T. Ummer
- Production company: Sangeetha Pictures
- Distributed by: Sangeetha Pictures
- Release date: 30 January 1976
- Country: India
- Language: Malayalam

Paalkkadal is a 1976 Indian Malayalam-language film, directed by T. K. Prasad and produced by K. K. S. Kaimal. The film stars Sheela, Sharada, Mohan Sharma, and Prema. The film has musical score by A. T. Ummer.

== Cast ==
- Sheela as Gouri
- Sharada as Sujatha
- Mohan Sharma as Dharman
- Prema as Beevathu
- Sankaradi as Mesthiri
- Raghavan as Suresh
- Bahadoor as Avaran
- Kottarakkara Sreedharan Nair as PN Menon
- M. G. Soman as Narendran
- Manavalan Joseph as Sanku
- Kunchan as Office peon
- CR Lakshmi as Dharman's mother

== Soundtrack ==
The music was composed by A. T. Ummer with lyrics by Sreekumaran Thampi.

No.	Song	Singers	Lyrics	Length (m:ss)
1	"Divaaswapnaminnenikkoru"	P. Madhuri, Vani Jairam	Sreekumaran Thampi	
2	"Indraneelaambaram"	P. Jayachandran	Sreekumaran Thampi	
3	"Kunkumapottiloorum"	Vani Jairam	Sreekumaran Thampi	
4	"Rathidevatha Shilpame"	K. J. Yesudas	Sreekumaran Thampi	
