= Sexilla Stundilla =

- Poster
- Directed by: B. N. Prakash
- Written by: V. Devan; Jagathy N. K. Achary (dialogues)
- Produced by: T. E. Vasudevan
- Starring: Jayabharathi; KPAC Lalitha; Adoor Bhasi; Manavalan Joseph
- Cinematography: B. N. Prakash
- Edited by: B. S. Mani
- Music by: V. Dakshinamoorthy
- Production company: Jaya Maruthi
- Distributed by: Jaya Maruthi
- Release date: 22 May 1976
- Country: India
- Language: Malayalam

Sexilla Stundilla is a 1976 Indian Malayalam film, directed by B. N. Prakash and produced by T. E. Vasudevan. The film stars Jayabharathi, KPAC Lalitha, Adoor Bhasi and Manavalan Joseph in the lead roles. The film has musical score by V. Dakshinamoorthy.

== Cast ==
- Vincent
- Jayabharathi
- KPAC Lalitha
- Adoor Bhasi
- Manavalan Joseph
- Jameela Malik
- Kuthiravattam Pappu
- Paravoor Bharathan

== Soundtrack ==
The music was composed by V. Dakshinamoorthy and the lyrics were written by Sreekumaran Thampi.

No.	Song	Singers	Lyrics	Length (m:ss)
1	"Anthappurathil"	L. R. Eeswari	Sreekumaran Thampi	
2	"Avaloru Premakavitha"	P. Jayachandran	Sreekumaran Thampi	
3	"Enikkum Kuirunnu"		Sreekumaran Thampi	
4	"Panchavaadyam Kottippaadum"	Ambili, Bombay Kuruvila	Sreekumaran Thampi	
5	"Utharagaarathil"	Jayashree	Sreekumaran Thampi	
6	"Yaa Ilaahi"	S. Janaki	Sreekumaran Thampi	
