= Anubhavam =

- Directed by: I. V. Sasi
- Written by: Sherif
- Screenplay by: Sherif
- Produced by: Ramachandran
- Starring: Sheela; Vincent; M. G. Soman; T. R. Omana
- Cinematography: J. Williams
- Edited by: K. Narayanan
- Music by: A. T. Ummer; Lyrics: Bichu Thirumala
- Release date: 10 June 1976
- Country: India
- Language: Malayalam

Anubhavam is a 1976 Indian Malayalam film, directed by I. V. Sasi and produced by Ramachandran. The film stars Sheela, Vincent, M. G. Soman and Jayabharathi in the lead roles. The film has musical score by A. T. Ummer.

== Cast ==
- Sheela as Valsala
- Jayabharathi as Mary
- Baby Sumathi as Young Mary
- Vincent as Johnny
- KP Ummer as Thomas
- M. G. Soman as Bosco
- Bahadoor as Kuttappan
- Mallika Sukumaran as Eali
- Adoor Bhasi as Varkey
- Sankaradi as Press owner
- T. R. Omana as Johnny's mother
- T. S. Muthaiah as Priest
- Janardhanan as Raju
- Kunchan as Pathrose
- Meena as Reetha

== Soundtrack ==
All lyrics are written by Bichu Thirumala; all music is composed by A. T. Ummer.

No.	Title	Artist(s)	Length
1.	"Kuruvikal Osana Paadum"	S. Janaki
2.	"Oru Malaril"	K. J. Yesudas
3.	"Souramayookham"	K. J. Yesudas, S. Janaki, Anita Reddy
4.	"Uncle Santa Claus"	C. O. Anto, Cochin Ibrahim, Manoharan, Zero Babu. The tune of this song is copied from "Daroo Ki Botal Mein" a song from the 1974 Bollywood movie Majboor.
5.	"Vaakappoomaram"	K. J. Yesudas
