= Rajaankanam =

- Directed by: Jeassy
- Written by: N. Govindankutty
- Screenplay by: N. Govindankutty
- Produced by: Chithrarekha
- Starring: Sheela; Vincent; Jayan; K. P. Ummer
- Cinematography: Ramachandra Babu
- Edited by: K. Narayanan
- Music by: M. K. Arjunan
- Release date: 1 October 1976
- Country: India
- Language: Malayalam

Rajaankanam is a 1976 Indian Malayalam film, directed by Jeassy and produced by Chithrarekha. The film stars Sheela, Vincent, Jayan and K. P. Ummer in the lead roles. The film has musical score by M. K. Arjunan.

== Cast ==
- Vincent as Vinayan
- M. G. Soman
- Jayan as Babu
- K. P. Ummer
- Sheela
- KPAC Lalitha
- Jose Prakash
- Sadhana

== Soundtrack ==
The music was composed by M. K. Arjunan and the lyrics were written by Appan Thacheth and Nelson.

No.	Song	Singers	Lyrics	Length (m:ss)
1	"Indraneela Thukilukal"	K. J. Yesudas	Appan Thacheth	
2	"Orshalemin"	P. Susheela	Nelson	
3	"Sandhyathan Kavil Thuduthu"	P. Jayachandran, Ambili	Appan Thacheth	
4	"Velichamevide"	Vani Jairam	Nelson	
