= Yakshagaanam =

- Theatrical release poster
- Directed by: Sheela
- Screenplay by: S. L. Puram Sadanandan
- Story by: Medhavi
- Produced by: Mathi Oli Shanmukham
- Starring: Madhu; Sheela; Adoor Bhasi; Thikkurissy Sukumaran Nair
- Cinematography: K. B. Dayalan; Melli Irani
- Edited by: Ravi Kiran
- Music by: M. S. Viswanathan
- Production company: Apsara Combines
- Distributed by: Thiruvonam Pictures; Ambika Release
- Release date: 23 January 1976
- Country: India
- Language: Malayalam

Yakshagaanam (transl. The song of Yakshi) is a 1976 Indian Malayalam-language horror film directed by Sheela (in her directorial debut) and written by S. L. Puram Sadanandan from a story by Medhavi. The film stars Madhu, Sheela, K. P. Ummer, Adoor Bhasi and Thikkurissy Sukumaran Nair. The film has musical score by M. S. Viswanathan. The film was remade in Telugu as Devude Gelichadu and in Tamil as Aayiram Jenmangal, which went on to be remade as Aranmanai in 2014.

== Plot ==
Dr Venu is an NRI, and his sister is Savitri. During his stay in an estate, he realizes that a spirit has possessed Savitri. To save his sister from the ghost, he seeks his psychiatrist friend for help.

== Cast ==
- Madhu as Ravi
- Sheela as Savithri
- Adoor Bhasi
- Thikkurissy Sukumaran Nair as Father of Ravi
- Manavalan Joseph
- Adoor Pankajam
- Adoor Bhavani
- Jayakumari
- K. P. Ummer as Dr Venu
- Sadhana
- T. K. Balachandran
- T. P. Madhavan
- Ushanandini

== Soundtrack ==
The music was composed by M. S. Viswanathan and the lyrics were written by Vayalar.

No.	Song	Singers	Lyrics	Length (m:ss)
1	"Arupathinaalu Kalakal"	L. R. Eeswari	Vayalar	
2	"Nisheedhini Nisheedhini"	S. Janaki	Vayalar	
3	"Pokaam Namukku"	S. Janaki	Vayalar	
4	"Thenkinnam Poonkinnam"	K. J. Yesudas, P. Susheela	Vayalar	
