= Raghavan (actor) =

Indian actor (born 1941)

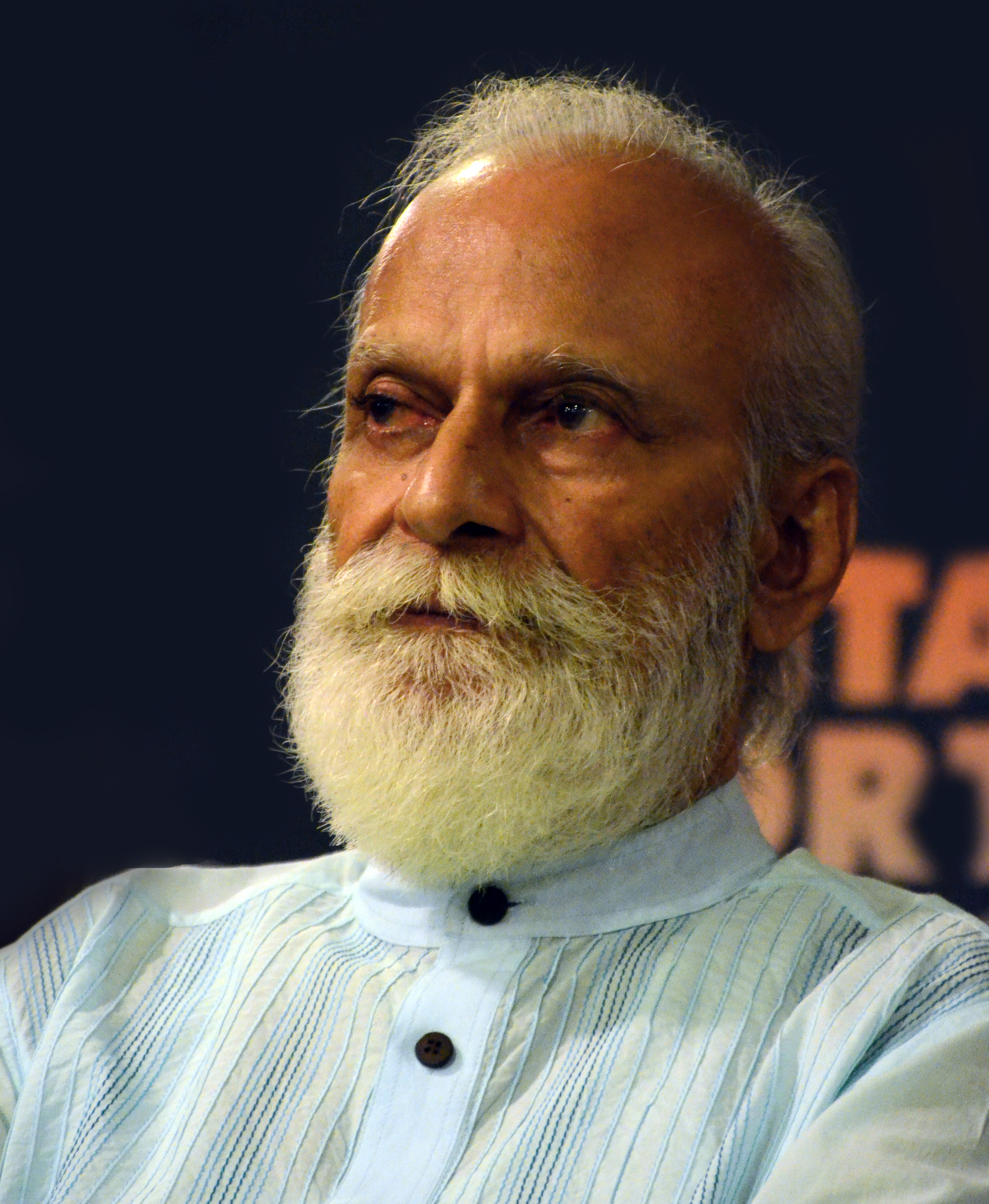
- Raghavan in 2018
- Born: 12 December 1941 (age 84); Taliparamba, Madras Presidency, British India
- Education: National School of Drama
- Occupations: Actor; director; screenwriter
- Years active: 1968–present
- Known for: Kilippaattu (1987); Evidence (1988); Kasthooriman (2017)
- Spouse: Shobha (m. 1974)
- Children: Jishnu; Jyothsna
- Relatives: Nyla Usha (niece)
- Awards: Kerala State Television Awards; Asianet Television Awards

Raghavan (IPA: [raːɡhəʋən] born 12 December 1941) is an Indian actor who has acted in predominately Malayalam films. He had received his wider popularity through the films C.I.D. Nazir (1971), Chembarathi (1972), Udayam (1973) and Angadi (1980). Since early 2000s he has been more active in television serials.

Raghavan appeared in several popular television serials, including Minnukettu (2004), Akashadoothu (2011), Vanambadi (2017) and Kasthooriman (2017). He made his directorial debut with Kilippaattu (1987), which was selected for the Indian Panorama section.

He was also a recipient of the Kerala State Television Awards and Asianet Television Awards.

== Early life and education ==
Raghavan was born in Taliparamba in Kannur district, and attended Moothedath High School there. After completing his higher secondary education, he joined the Tagore Drama Troupe. Raghavan earned a bachelor's degree in Rural Education from the Gandhigram Rural Institute and later obtained a diploma from the National School of Drama.

He made his film debut in 1968, in the film Kayalkkarayil.

== Personal life ==
He married Shobha in 1974, and they had two children: a son, actor Jishnu Raghavan, and a daughter, Jyothsna.

His son, actor Jishnu Raghavan, was diagnosed with throat and lung cancer and underwent treatment following a recurrence of the disease in 2015. He died at Amrita Hospital in Kochi on 25 March 2016, aged 36.

== Filmography ==
=== Films ===
Year	Title	Role	Notes	Ref
1968	Kayalkkarayil	Premkumar		
1969	Chowkada Deepa	Ashokan	Kannada film	
1969	Rest House	Raghavan		
1969	Veettumrugam	Mohan Nair		
1970	Kuttavaali	Keshavan		
1970	Abhayam	Murali		
1970	Ammayenna Sthree	Sasi		
1971	C.I.D. Nazir	CID Chandran		
1971	Thapaswini	Raghavan Nair		
1971	Prathidhwani	Saikumar		
1971	Aabhijathyam	Chandran		
1971	Ummachu	Shankar		
1972	Nrithasaala	Venu		
1972	Chembarathi	Dinesh		
1973	Chaayam	Jayan		
1973	Darshanam	Devarajan		
1973	Mazhakkaaru	Radhakrishnan		
1973	Gayathri	Raghavan		
1973	Periyar	Joy		
1973	Aaraadhika	Hari		
1973	Sasthram Jayichu Manushyan Thottu	Venugopal		
1973	Nakhangal	Yesudas		
1973	Prethangalude Thaazhvara	Vijay Menon		
1973	Udayam	Mohandas		
1973	Aashaachakram	Gopalan		
1973	Swargaputhri	Doctor		
1973	Urvashi Bharathi	Govindan		
1974	Chanchala	Hari		
1974	Kamini	Chandran		
1974	Youvanam	Ravi		
1974	Sapthaswarangal	Ajayan		
1974	Rajahamsam	Janardhanan		
1974	Moham	Arjunan		
1974	Ayalathe Sundari	Venu		
1974	Nagaram Saagaram	Sreekumar		
1974	Bhoogolam Thiriyunnu	Sukumaran		
1974	Swarnavigraham	Swami		
1974	Pathiraavum Pakalvelichavum	Shivan		
1974	Pattabhishekam	Gireesh		
1975	Swami Ayappan	Prabhakaran		
1975	Niramaala	Surya		
1975	Madhurappathinezhu	Ramkumar		
1975	Utsavam	Gopi		
1975	Bhaarya Illaatha Raathri	Hariharan		
1975	Ayodhya	Madhavankutty		
1975	Malsaram	Soman Kutty		
1976	Aalinganam	Ramesh		
1976	Hridayam Oru Kshethram	Hari		
1976	Madhuram Thirumadhuram	Vijayan		
1976	Light House	Raghu		
1976	Maanasaveena	Suresh		
1976	Amba Ambika Ambaalika	Salvarajakumaran		
1976	Paalkkadal	Suresh		
1977	Sreemurukan	Gopalan		
1977	Manassoru Mayil	Raju		
1977	Aadhya Paadam	Ravi		
1977	Sukradasa	Jayaprakash		
1977	Raajaparampara	Raghavan		
1977	Taxi Driver	Keshava Nair		
1977	Oonjaal	Madhu		
1977	Vidarunna Mottukal	Gopal		
1977	Varadakshina	Gopi		
1978	Priyadarshini	Ramu		
1978	Vadakakku Oru Hridayam	Parameswara Pillai		
1978	Kaithappoo	Raghavan Menon		
1978	Hemantharaathri	Ravi's father		
1978	Balapareekshanam	Sankarankutty		
1978	Rowdy Ramu	Vasu		
1978	Anumodhanam	Raghavan		
1978	Raju Rahim	Suresh		
1978	Manoradham	Devan		
1979	Ajnaatha Theerangal	Ravi		
1979	Ottapettavar	Rajan		
1979	Jimmy	Joseph		
1979	Ival Oru Naadodi	Sudheer		
1979	Amrithachumbanam	Rahim		
1979	Raajaveedhi	Kamal		
1979	Lajjaavathi	Prem Kumar		
1979	Kannukal	Sudhakaran		
1979	Hridayathinte Nirangal	Madhusudhan		
1979	Eeswara Jagadeeswara	Jagadeeswaran		
1980	Angadi	SI Ravi		
1980	Saraswatheeyamam	Gopi		
1980	Ivar	Damu		
1980	Adhikaaram	Raveendran		
1981	Poocha Sanyasi	Vishnu Vasudevan		
1981	Vaadaka Veettile Athidhi	Madhava Nair		
1981	Panchapandavar	Arjunan		
1982	Anguram	Madhavi's father		
1982	Innalenkil Nale	Advocate		
1982	Ponmudy	Gopi		
1982	Lahari	Raghavan		
1985	Rangam	Naanu		
1985	Njaan Piranna Naattil	DYSP Raghava Menon		
1986	Chekkeranoru Chilla	Ravi		
1987	Ellaavarkkum Nanmakal	Priyan		
1988	1921	Anandan		
1988	Evidence	Father Dominic		
1992	Adwaytham	Kizhakkedan Thirumeni		
1992	Priyapetta Kukku	Ajayan's father		
1993	O' Faby	PC Rajaram		
1994	Avan Ananthapadmanaabhan	Manju's father		
1995	Prayikkara Pappan	Kanaran		
1997	Kulam	Bharathan		
1997	Athyunnathangalil Koodaaram Panithavar	Rajiv		
1999	Varnachirakukal	Siddharth		
2000	Indriyam	Shankaranarayanan		
2001	Meghamalhar	Mukundan's father		
2001	Vakkalathu Narayanankutty	Judge		
2004	Udayam	Judge		
2009	My Big Father	Doctor		
2010	Swantham Bharya Zindabad	Shivankutty's Father		
2010	Ingenyum Oral	Pisharody Master		
2012	Scene Onnu Nammude Veedu	Manju's uncle		
2012	Banking Hours 10 to 4	Lakshmi's father		
2012	Ordinary	Priest		
2013	Aattakatha	Sreedharan Namboothiri		
2013	The Power of Silence	Aravindan's father		
2014	Apothecary	Dr. Shankar Vasudev		
2015	Salt Mango Tree	Swami		
2016	Aalroopangal	Panicker		
2017	C/O Saira Banu	Judge Janardhana Kurup		
2018	Pretham 2	Venu Vaidyar		
2018	Ente Ummante Peru	Raghavan		
2018	Dehantharam	Son	Short film	
2019	Luca	Doctor		
2020	Uma Maheswara Ugra Roopasya	Manohar Rao	Telugu film	
2020	Kilometers and Kilometers	Vicar		
2022	Pathonpatham Noottandu	Eswaran Namboothiri		
2023	The Hope	Fr Benedict		
2024	Panchayath Jetty	Farmer Raghavan		

=== TV series ===
Year	Title	Role	Network	Ref	Notes
2001	Vaakacharthu	Chandran	Doordarshan		Debut series
2001	Shamanathalam	Raghavan	Asianet		
2002	Vasundara Medicals	Krishnan	Asianet		
2003	Sreeraman Sreedevi	Vijay	Asianet		
2004	Muhurtham	Shankaranarayanan	Asianet		
2004	Kadamattath Kathanar	Fr. Emmanuel	Asianet		
2004–2009	Minnukettu	Keshavan Nair	Surya TV		
2005	Krishnakripasagaram	Lord Vasudeva	Amrita TV		
2006	Sneham	Balachabdran	Surya TV		
2007	St.Antony	Antony	Surya TV		
2007–2009	Sreeguruvayoorappan	Vishnu Nair	Surya TV		
2007–2009	Rahasyam	Shravan Varma	Asianet		
2008	Velankani Mathavu	Priest	Surya TV		
2009	Swamiye Saranam Ayappa	Pandala Rajavu	Surya TV		
2010	Indraneelam	Sasi	Surya TV		
2012–2013	Akashadoothu	Krishna's father	Surya TV		
2012	Snehakkoodu	Shivan	Surya TV		
2014–2016	Bhagyalakshmi	Bhagya's father	Surya TV		
2016	Amme Mahamaye	Lord Bramha	Surya TV		
2017	Moonnumani	Gurudevan	Flowers		
2017–2019	Vanambadi	Devan	Asianet		
2017–2020	Kasthooriman	Kalamandalam Krishnankutty Ashan	Asianet		
2019	Mouna Ragam	Guruji	Star Vijay		Tamil debut
2021–2024	Kaliveedu	Sabarmathi Vishwanathan	Surya TV		

=== As director ===
Year	Title	Ref
1987	Kilippaattu	
1988	Evidence	

=== As screenwriter ===
Year	Title	Ref
1987	Kilippaattu	

== Accolades ==
Year	Award	Category	Work	Result	Ref
2009	Kerala Film Critics Association Awards	Chalachitra Prathibha	—N/a	Won	
2018	Asianet Television Awards	Lifetime Achievement	Kasthooriman	Won	
2018	Tharangini Television Awards	Lifetime Achievement	Vanambadi	Won	
2018	Janmabhoomi Awards	Best Character Actor	Kasthooriman	Won	
2019	Kerala State Television Awards	Best Actor	Dehanthram	Won	
2019	Thoppil Bhasi award	Lifetime Achievement	—N/a	Won	
2024	P Bhaskaran Birth Centenary Award	—N/a	—N/a	Won	

== See also ==
- List of Malayalam film actors
- List of Indian male film actors
