= Sheela =

Indian actress (born 1945)

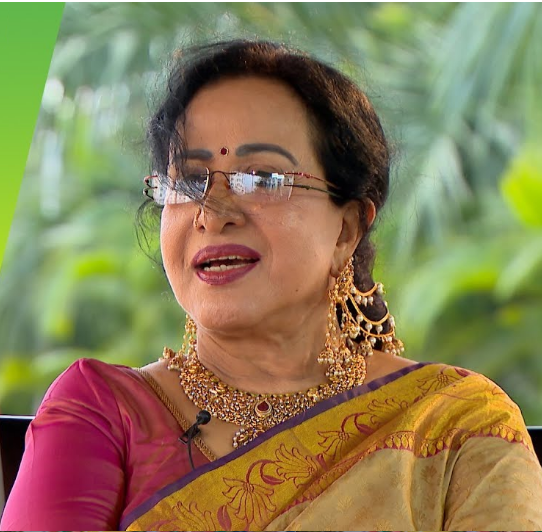
- Sheela in 2017
- Born: Sheela Celine; 22 March 1945 (age 81); Kanimangalam, Kingdom of Cochin, British Raj (present-day Kanimangalam, Thrissur, Kerala)
- Occupations: Actress; writer; film director; novelist; painter; television host
- Years active: 1962–1981; 2003–present
- Spouses: Xavier (div. 1970); Ravichandran (divorced)
- Children: George Vishnu

Sheela Celine (born 22 March 1945), known mononymously as Sheela, is an Indian actress and director who appears predominantly in Malayalam cinema. Paired with Prem Nazir, they hold the Guinness World Record for acting in the largest number of films (around 105) together as heroine and hero. She had also appeared in another 20 films with Prem Nazir, even as his mother in a film. Sheela is a four-time winner of Kerala State Film Award. She came back to acting in 2003 through Manassinakkare after 22 years. In 2005, she won the National Film Award for Best Supporting Actress for her role in the Malayalam film Akale. In 2019, Sheela was honoured with the J C Daniel Award, the Kerala government's highest honour for outstanding contribution to Malayalam cinema. She was also one of the highest paid actresses, reportedly paid more than her male counterparts, of her time.

== Early life and family ==
Sheela was born at Kanimangalam to Antony, a railway officer, and Gracy in Thrissur, Kingdom of Cochin (now Kerala). She was brought up in Ooty. Since her father was working with the railways, she was brought up in different places before finally settling down at Chennai. As a result, she had her primary education at various places, including Thiruvananthapuram, Thrissur, Ooty, Tiruchirappalli, Salem, Edappally, and St. Francis Anglo-Indian Girls School, Coimbatore. She was initially married to Xavier, a reporter, which ended in a divorce. She was then married to Tamil actor Ravichandran, and they have a son, George Vishnu.

== Film career ==
Sheela was introduced to theatre at the age of 13 by Tamil actor S. S. Rajendran, he offered her a job in S.S.R Nataka Mandram. She was introduced into the film industry at the age of 17 by MGR in the Tamil film Paasam (1962). M. G. Ramachandran, the hero of the film, added the suffix "Devi" to her name, thus he renamed her "Sheela Devi". She would continue to act in Tamil films with that name. Later, she reverted her name to Sheela, her original name. The same year, she made her Malayalam debut through Bhagyajathakam. The next two decades saw her act in more than 475 films in various languages such as Malayalam, Tamil, Telugu, and Urdu. Her popular films are Chemmeen, Kallichellamma, Velutha Kathreena Akale, Oru Penninte Kadha, Sarsaiya, Yakshaganam, Kutti Kuppayam, Sthanarthy Saramma, Kadathunattu Makkan, Jeevikkan Marannupoya Sthree, Jwala, Vazhve Mayam, Anubhavam,Sarapancharam, etc. In Kannapanunni, she plays the role of a powerful yet humane princess forced to marry a poor woodcutter. In Kadathanattu Makkam, she plays the role of a princess who is cheated by her sisters-in-law and false allegations of being in love with a boatman are leveled against her. She and the boatman are both given the death sentence.

In the 1970s and 1980s, she directed and wrote the story as well as screenplay for two films Shikharangal and Yakshaganom, which was also remade in Tamil. Sheela wrote the story and screenplay for Mammooty starrer Onnu Chiriku. Besides films, she has directed a tele-film titled Ninaivukale Neengividu, co-starring Jayabharathi. Her other films include Vishnu Vijayam and Eeta. She retired from the film industry in 1983 and settled at Ootacamund, Tamil Nadu. After a long sabbatical, she returned to acting, playing a role in Sathyan Anthikkad's Manassinakkare (2003). The same year, she acted in the Tamil film Chandramukhi.

Sheela and Prem Nazir hold the Guinness World Record for acting in the highest number of films (130) together. In 2005, she won the National Film Award for Best Supporting Actress and Kerala State Film Award for Second Best Actress for her role in the Malayalam film Akale. She received the Kerala State Film Award for Best Actress thrice in her film career in 1969, 1971, and 1976. She has won awards such as Kerala State Film Awards, the Lux award, and the Filmfare Lifetime Achievement award. Sheela made an exhibition of her paintings at hotel Le- Meridian in Ernakulam and 93 paintings were sold, most of which were bought by Snehatheeram Baby Mathew and Ravi Pillai. The amount collected from these paintings was donated as a flood relief fund for the people in Chennai.

== Awards ==
National Film Awards

- 2005 Best Supporting Actress – Akale

Kerala State Film Awards

- 1969 – Kerala State Film Award for Best Actress for Kallichellamma
- 1971 – Kerala State Film Award for Best Actress for Oru Penninte Kadha, Sarassayya, Ummachu
- 1976 – Kerala State Film Award for Best Actress for Anubhavam
- 2004 – Second Best Actress for Akale

Filmfare Awards South

- 1977 – Best Malayalam Actress – Lakshmi
- 2000 – Filmfare Lifetime Achievement Award – South

South Indian International Movie Awards

- 2021 – Lifetime Achievement Award

Other Awards

- 2019 J. C. Daniel Award
- 2019 Jayan Ragamalika Award
- 2020 Malayala Puraskaram
- 2024 Mazhavil Entertainment Awards - Evergreen Entertainer Award

== Filmography ==
=== Actress ===
==== Malayalam ====
- 1962 – Bagyajathakam as Radha
- 1963 – Kattumaina as Neeli
- 1963 – Ninamaninja Kalpadukal as Ammini
- 1963 – Doctor as Jayasree
- 1963 – Susheela as Hema
- 1963 – Moodupadam as Ammukutty
- 1964 – Aayisha as Amina
- 1964 – Althara as Rebecca
- 1964 – Kuttikuppayam as Safiya
- 1964 – Karutha Kai as Latha
- 1964 – Bharthavu as Sumathi
- 1964 – Kudumbini as Jaanu
- 1964 – Oral Koodi Kallanayi as Ayisha
- 1965 – Thankakudam as Kabir's wife
- 1965 – Kavyamela as Sreedevi
- 1965 – Porter Kunjali as Aamina
- 1965 – Mayavi as Vasanthy
- 1965 – Thommante Makkal as Marykutty
- 1965 – Jeevitha Yaathra as Radha
- 1965 – Muthalali as Devaki
- 1965 – Chemmeen as Karuthamma
- 1965 – Daaham as Latha
- 1965 – Kadathukaran as Madhuri
- 1965 – Kathirunna Nikkah as Laila
- 1965 – Pattuthuvala as Celine
- 1966 - Rowdy as Devayani
- 1966 - Penmakkal as Padma
- 1966 – Priyathama
- 1966 – Tharavattamma as Radha
- 1966 – Kanakachilanka
- 1966 – Sthanarthi Saramma as Saramma
- 1966 – Kalithozhan as Radha
- 1966 – Koottukar as Radha
- 1967 – Lady Doctor as Lilly
- 1967 – Collector Malathi as Malathy
- 1967 – Kanatha Veshangal
- 1967 – Khadeeja
- 1967 – Mainatheruvi Kolacase as Marykutti
- 1967 – Cochin Express as Geetha
- 1967 – Swapnabhoomi as Sreedevi
- 1967 – Kottayam Kolacase
- 1967 – Pathirapattu as Soldier's wife
- 1967 – Chithramela
- 1967 – Agniputhri as Sindhu
- 1967 – Balyakalasakhi as Suhara
- 1967 – Ramanan as Chandrika
- 1967 – Pooja as Anandam
- 1967 – Olathumathi
- 1967 – Nadan Pennu as Achamma
- 1967 – Ashwamedham as Sarojam
- 1967 – Kudumbam as Nirmala
- 1968 – Thulabaram as Valsala
- 1968 – Agnipareeksha as Hema
- 1968 – Punnapra Vayalar as Chellamma
- 1968 – Love in Kerala as Mala
- 1968 – Padunna Puzha as Rajalakshmi
- 1968 – Velutha Kathreena as Kathreena
- 1968 – Vidhyarthi
- 1968 – Kayalkarayil
- 1968 – Lakshaprabhu
- 1968 – Bharyamar Sookshikkuka as Shobha
- 1968 – Anachadanam
- 1968 – Thirichadi as Ramani
- 1969 – Kallichellamma as Chellamma
- 1969 – Virunnukari as Radha
- 1969 – Kadalpalam as Sarala
- 1969 – Adimakal as Saraswathiyamma
- 1969 – Mister Kerala
- 1969 – Rest House as Leela
- 1969 – Koottukudumbam as Thankamma
- 1969 – Aalmaram as Kusumam
- 1969 – Kannur Deluxe as Jayasree
- 1969 – Jwala as Rajamma
- 1969 – Kuruthikalam
- 1969 – Pooja Pushppam
- 1969 – Rahsayam as Ammini
- 1969 – Danger Biscuit as Aswathy
- 1970 – Vazhve Mayam as Sarala, Sarala's daughter (double role)
- 1970 – Kurukshethram as Sethulakshmi
- 1970 – Vivaham Swargathil
- 1970 – Aranazhika Neram as Shanthamma
- 1970 – Ambalapravu as Sharadha
- 1970 – Mindapennu as Kamalam
- 1970 – Lottery Ticket as Malathy
- 1970 – Dathuputhran as Gracy
- 1970 – Bheekara Nimishangal as Savithri
- 1970 – Abhayam as Sethulakshmi
- 1970 – Othenante Makan as Unnimaathu
- 1970 – Ezhuthatha Kadha as Kayamkulam Kamalamma
- 1970 – Nizhalattam as Shantha
- 1970 – Ningalenne Communistakki as Sumam
- 1970 – Aa Chithrashalabam Paranotte as Indira
- 1970 – Nazhikakallu
- 1970 – Kalpana as Sushamma, Susheela, Kalpana
- 1970 – Moodalmanju as Geetha, Usha
- 1970 – Anadha as Radha
- 1970 – Palunku Pathram
- 1971 – Vivaha Sammanam as Gourikutty
- 1971 – Ummachu as Ummachu
- 1971 – Thettu as Baby
- 1971 – Puthenveedu
- 1971 – Sumangali as Vasanthy
- 1971 – Sarasayya as Sarojam
- 1971 – Anubhavangal Paalichakal as Bhavani
- 1971 – Inquilab Sindabad as Rajamma
- 1971 – Panchavankaadu as Kochu Thankachi
- 1971 – Moonnupookkal as Shobha
- 1971 – Shiksha as Shobha
- 1971 – Muthassi as Susi/Geetha
- 1971 – Oru Penninte Kadha as Savithri/Gayathridevi
- 1971 – Makane Ninaku Vendi as Chinnamma
- 1971 – Karinizhal as Malathy/Baby
- 1971 – Agnimrugam as Bhanumathi
- 1971 – Vithukal as Sarojini
- 1971 – Thapaswini
- 1971 – Kalithozhi as Ammini
- 1971 – Avalalppam Vaikipoyi
- 1972 – Omana as Omana
- 1972 – Baalya Prathinja as Kusuma
- 1972 – Sakthi
- 1972 – Preethi
- 1972 – Aradimanite Janmi as Dr.Jayanthy
- 1972 – Nadan Premam as Malu
- 1972 – Anandashayanam
- 1972 – Puthrakameshti as Rupa
- 1972 – Aromalunni as Maakkam
- 1972 – Manushya Bandangal as Sudha
- 1972 – Devi
- 1973 – Ithu Manushyanano
- 1973 – Chukku as Molly
- 1973 – Kaapalika as Rosamma/Kaapalika
- 1973 – Chaayam
- 1974 – Jeevikkan Marannu Poya Sthree
- 1974 – Thumbolarcha as Thumbolarcha
- 1974 – Manyashree Vishvamithran as Kusumam
- 1974 – Shapamoksham
- 1974 – Vishnuvijayam as Leela
- 1974 – Aswathy
- 1975 – Athithi as Ramani
- 1975 – Omanakunju as Gouri
- 1975 – Odakuzhal
- 1975 – Mattoru Seetha as Seetha's sister
- 1975 – Ulasayathra
- 1976 – Palkadal as Gouri
- 1976 – Anubhavam as Valsala
- 1976 – Rajankanam
- 1976 – Mallanum Mathevanum
- 1976 – Yakshagaanam as Savithri
- 1976 – Romeo
- 1977 – Kannappanunni as Ponni
- 1977 – Samudram as Omana
- 1977 – Acharam Ammini Osharam Omana... PC Omana, Ammini (double role)
- 1977 – Aashirvadam
- 1977 – Aa Nimisham
- 1977 – Veedoru Swargam
- 1977 – Lakshmi
- 1977 – Kavilamma
- 1977 – Poojakedukatha Pookkal as Sharada
- 1977 – Yatheem as Kunjivarachi
- 1977 – Aparadhi as Susheela
- 1977 – Niraparayum Nilavilakkum
- 1977 – Innale Innu as Thulasi
- 1977 – Mohavum Mukthiyum
- 1977 – Ivanente Priyaputhran
- 1977 – Neethipeedam
- 1977 – Aval Oru Devalayam as Jameela
- 1978 – Bharyayum Kamukiyum
- 1978 – Jalatharangam as Lakshmi
- 1978 – Eeta as Annamma
- 1978 – Jayikkanayi Janichavan as Lakshmi
- 1978 – Amarsham
- 1978 – Itha Oru Manushyan as Radha
- 1978 – Anappachan as Sundari
- 1978 – Tiger Salim
- 1978 – Kanyaka as Geetha
- 1978 – Etho Oru Swapnam as Kousalya
- 1978 – Kadathanattu Makkam as Makkam
- 1978 – Vilakkum Velichavum
- 1978 – Ahalya
- 1979 – Avesham as Susheela
- 1979 – Sarapancharam as Soudamini
- 1979 – Pathivrutha
- 1979 – Sikharangal as Savithri
- 1979 – Pichathikuttappan
- 1979 – Yakshiparu as Paru
- 1980 – Theenalangal as Devamma/Leelamma
- 1980 – Avan Oru Ahankari
- 1980 – Kalika as Kalika
- 1980 – Nattuchakkiruttu
- 1980 – Ithile Vannavar as Devi Menon
- 1980 – Akalangalil Abhayam
- 1980 - Pappu as herself
- 1981 – Adimachangala
- 1981 – Urukku Mushttikal
- 1981 – Sphodanam as Devaki
- 1981 – Thakilu Kottampuram as Mridula
- 1981 – Thalam Manasinte Thalam
- 1982 - Sahyante Makan
- 1982 – Madrasile Mon
- 1982 – Aasha
- 2003 – Manassinakkare as Kochu Thresia
- 2004 – Akale as Margaret D'Costa
- 2005 – Thaskara Veeran as Meenakhsi
- 2005 – Ponmudipuzhayorathu as Subhadramma
- 2006 – Pathaka as Elizabeth Mamman
- 2008 - Twenty:20 as herself (Archive footage/Uncredited cameo)
- 2011 – Naayika as herself (Archive footage/Uncredited cameo)
- 2011 – Snehaveedu as Ammukutty Amma
- 2011 – Kottarathil Kutty Bhootham as Grandma
- 2012 - Lumiere Brothers as herself (Archive footage/Uncredited cameo)
- 2012 – Mr. Marumakan as Raja Kokila
- 2014 – Ulsaha Committee as Rosemary
- 2017 – Basheerinte Premalekhanam as Ummuma
- 2019 - Thanka Bhasma Kuriyitta Thamburatty as herself
  (Archive footage/Uncredited cameo)
- 2019 - A for Apple as Lekshmy
- 2021 - Ammachikoottile Pranayakalam as Rosamma
- 2023 - Anuragam
- 2025- Oru Kadha Oru Nala Kadha

==== Tamil ====
- Paasam (1962) as Chandra
- Panathottam (1963) as Meena
- Vanambadi (1963) as Chitra
- Kaattumaina (1963)
- Karpagam (1963) as Pankajam
- Chitrangi (1964)
- Karuppu Panam (1964) as Luci
- Nanum Manidandhan (1964)
- Kaattu Ranni (1965) as Meena
- Idhayak Kamalam (1965) as Seetha
- Lorry Driver (1966)
- Vallavan Oruvan (1966) as Susi
- Gowri Kalyanam (1966) as Lakshmi
- Paal Manam (1968)
- Pudhiya Bhoomi (1968) as Nalina
- Sathyam Thavaradhey (1968) as Leela
- Moondrezhuthu (1968) as Suguna
- Odum Nadhi (1969) as Maya
- Pennai Vazha Vidungal (1969) as Shanathi
- Manjal Kungumam (1973) as Subhadra
- Amma Appa (1974)
- Sendhoora Devi (1991)
- Bombay (1995)
- Chandramukhi (2005) as Akhilandeswari
- Veeranna (2005) as Rajeshwari
- Seedan (2011) as Amritavalli
- Palakkattu Madhavan (2015) as Pattu Maami
- Marravan (2016) as Velambal

==== Telugu ====
- Nene Monaganni (1968) as Neela
- Nenena Managadu (1968)
- Vichitra Kutumbam (1969) as Julie
- Bhale Mastaru (1969) as Vimala
- Gowravam (1982)

=== Story, screenplay, and direction ===
- Yakshagaanam (1976)
- Sikharangal (1979)
- Onnu Chirikkoo (1983) - Story only

== Television ==
=== Malayalam ===
Shows as host

- Jeevitham Sakshi (Kairali TV) as presenter
- Sthree (Asianet News) as presenter

Serials

- Velutha Kathrina (Kairali TV) as Kathreena
- Kanalpoovu (Kairali TV) as Pulikattil Kathreena/Eliyamma
- Aliyans (Kaumudy TV) as herself
- Kadhanayika (Mazhavil Manorama)

As judge

- Oru Chiri Oru Chiri Bumper Chiri (Mazhavil Manorama)
- Malayali Veetamma (Flowers TV)
- Smile Plz (Asianet Plus)
- Ugram Ujjwalam (Mazhavil Manorama)
- Comedy Stars season 2 (Asianet)
- Comedy Festival (Mazhavil Manorama)
- Red Carpet (Amrita TV) - Mentor
- Star Magic (Flowers TV) - Mentor
- Comedy masters ( Amrita TV)
- Katturumbu 2 ( Flowers TV)

Other shows as guest

- Flowers Oru Kodi
- Bhava Nayika
- Ningalkkum Aakaam Kodeeshwaran
- JB Junction
- Onnum Onnum Moonnu
- Laughing Villa
- Close Encounter
- Nammude Swantham Karuthammayude Onam
- Badayi Bunglavu
- Comedy Super Nite
- Portrait of an actress
- Nere Chovve
- Ithihasa Nayikakkoppam
- Cinema Rendezvous
- Thara Raja Thara Rani
- Lime Light
- Hello Europe
- Star Chat
- Merry Sheela
- Varikalkkidayil
- Puraskara Niravil Nithya Haritha Nayika
- Media One Online
- Mathrubhumi Online
- Cinema Diary
- DD Interview
- Aashwasaganga
- I Me Myself
- Europe Malayali Journal
- Sheelayude Varthamanam

=== Tamil ===
Serials

- Neenivayukale Neengi Vidu (Story, Screenplay, Direction; Doordarshan)
- Aayiram Janmangal starring Rajnikanth (written by Sheela)
- Rusi Kanda Poonai starring Saritha (written by Sheela)

Other Programmes

- Natchathira Sangamam

== Theatre ==
- Kuttavum Shikshyum
