= N. Sankaran Nair =

Indian director of Malayalam movies

- Born: 29 July 1925; Chennai
- Died: 18 December 2005
- Occupation: Director
- Years active: mid 1950s – 2005
- Spouse: Usharani (1977-2005)

== Biography ==
N. Sankaran Nair was an Indian director of Malayalam movies. Since the mid-1950s he had directed around 40 movies.

== Filmography ==
=== Directed movies ===
- Nishasurabhikal (2000)
- Agni Nilavu (1991)
- Kanakambarangal (1988)
- Theruvu Narthaki (1988)
- Ee Nootandile Maha Rogam (1987)
- Cabaret Dancer (1986)
- Niramulla Ravulkal (1986)
- Kalki (1984)
- Kudumbam Oru Swargam Bharya Oru Devatha (1984)
- Ponmudy (1982)
- Chandra Bimbam (1980)
- Swattu (1980)
- Chuvanna Chirakukal (1979)
- Lovely (1979)
- Paapathinu Maranamilla (1979)
- Veera Bhadran (1979)
- Mamatha (1979)
- Ee Ganam Marakkumo (1978)
- Madanolsavam (1978)
- Sathrathil Oru Rathri (1978)
- Thamburatti (1978)
- Tharu Oru Janmam Koodi (1978)
- Kavilamma (1977)
- Poojakkedukkatha Pookkal (1977)
- Siva Thandavum (1977)
- Sreedevi (1977)
- Thulavarsham (1976)
- Rasaleela (1975)
- Vishnu Vijayam (1974)
- Madhuvidhu (1970)
- Chattambi Kavala (1969)
- Arakkillam (1967)
- Avar Unarunnu (1956)

=== Screenplay ===
- Premaagni (2001)
- Swathu (1980)
- Chuvanna Chirakukal (1979)
- Madanolsavam (1978)
- Sivathaandavam (1977)
- Raasaleela (1975)

=== Story ===
- Premaagni (2001)
- Ponmudi (1982)
- Swathu (1980)
- Madanolsavam (1978)
- Sivathaandavam (1977)

=== Dialogue ===
- Chuvanna Chirakukal (1979)
- Sivathaandavam (1977)
- Raasaleela (1975)

== See also ==
- List of Malayalam films from 1951 to 1960
- List of Malayalam films from 1961 to 1970
- List of Malayalam films from 1971 to 1975
- List of Malayalam films from 1976 to 1980
- List of Malayalam films from 1981 to 1985
- List of Malayalam films from 1986 to 1990
- List of Malayalam films from 1991 to 1995
