= Sreelatha Namboothiri =

Indian actress, playback singer

- Born: Anjilivelil Vasantha; 4 February 1950 (age 76); Karuvatta, Alappuzha, Travancore, India
- Occupations: Actress; playback singer
- Years active: 1967–1985; 2005–present
- Works: Full list
- Children: 2

Sreelatha Namboothiri (born Anjilivelil Vasantha) is an Indian actress and playback singer who works in Malayalam cinema and television. She has acted in more than 300 films. Khadeeja in 1967 was her debut movie. She began her acting career in 1953 through the movie Ashadeepam as a child artist and completed 70 years On Malayalam film industry in 2023.

== Early life ==
Sreelatha was born as Vasantha, in Karuvatta, Alappuzha. Her father Anjilivelil Balakrishnan Nair was an army officer and her mother, Kamalamma was a music teacher in Government school. Her primary education was at Government Girls High School, Haripad, Alappuzha. She was an athlete while at school. She won second prize for long jump twice at state level. She joined K.P.A.C. (Kerala People's Arts Club), when she was studying in seventh grade, as a singer and later started performing drama in many stages. She could not continue her studies after that. She learned classical music from Dakshinamurthy.

== Personal life ==
She was married to Kaladi Parameshwaran Namboothiri, known as Kaladi Namboothiri, an actor and Ayurveda doctor in 1979. They both acted together in Papathinu Maranamilla, a 1979 movie. She took a break from movies after marriage and settled in Kunnamkulam, Thrissur. The couple has a son, Visakh, and a daughter, Ganga. She made a comeback, after her husband's death in 2005, with Pathaaka. She currently resides at Thiruvananthapuram, Kerala.
