= List of works by Padmarajan =

Padmarajan (23 May 1945 – 24 January 1991) was an Indian author, screenwriter, and film director. His stories deal with deceit, murder, romance, mystery, passion, jealousy, libertinism, anarchism, individualism, and the life of peripheral elements of society. Some of them are considered as among the best in Malayalam literature.

Padmarajan was noted for his fine and detailed screenwriting and expressive direction style. The follow list details all of his known written and directorial published works.

== Novels ==
#	Name	Translation in English
1	Itha Ivide Vare	Here! Till Now
2	Jalajwala	The Watery Fire
3	Manju Kaalam Notta Kuthira	The Horse Which Longed for Winter
4	Nakshathrangale Kaaval	Only Stars to guard thee.
5	Nanmakalude Sooryan	The Sun of Virtues
6	Onnu Randu Moonnu	One two Three
7	Peruvazhiyambalam	The Tavern
8	Prathimayum Rajakumariyum	The Statue and the Princess
9	Rathinirvedam	Venereal Disenchantment
10	Rithubhedhangalude Paarithoshikam	The Reward of Vicissitudes
11	Shavavahanangalum Thedi	In Search of Biers
12	Udakappola	Bubbles on a stream
13	Vadakakku Oru Hridayam	A heart for hire
14	Vikramakaaleeswaram	

== Short stories ==
Name	Year	Book
"Aanakkeni"	1968	Prahelika
"Aattinkuttiyum Chennayayum"	(NA)	—
"Achan"	(NA)	—
"Agnikkuri"	1970	Mattullavarude Venal
"Ajnathamaya Oru Nadu"	(NA)	—
"Akale Sandhya Marikkunnu"	(NA)	—
"Alappuzha"	1972	—
"Amrithethu"	1971	Pukakkannada
"Anubandham"	(NA)	—
"Aparan"	1967	Aparan
"Arante Ammayude Shavam"	(NA)	—
"Arappatta Kettiya Gramathil"	(NA)	Kaivariyude Thekkeyattam
"Athirthi"	(NA)	Kaivariyude Thekkeyattam
"Athithi"	(NA)	Kaivariyude Thekkeyattam
"Avakashikalude Prashnam"	1977	—
"Avar Appozhum"	(NA)	—
"Azhchayaruthi"	(NA)	Kaivariyude Thekkeyattam
"Banion Avenue"	(NA)	—
"Bhadra"	1967	Prahelika
"Busum Goulikalum"	(NA)	—
"Chiraku Viriyunnathuvare..."	(NA)	—
"Choondal"	1967	Aparan
Daya (Avalude Katha)	1970	Prahelika
"Enikku Kireedam Venda"	(NA)	—
"Ente Prabhatham Undavatte"	(NA)	—
Garbhapathrangalkkullil Shavangal	1971	—
"Girijayude Swapnam"	(NA)	—
"Homappakshiyute Muttakal"	1977	—
"Jalappishachu"	(NA)	—
"Jeevithacharya"	(NA)	Kaivariyude Thekkeyattam
"Kabandhagathi"	1970	Aparan
"Kabar"	1970	Aparan
"Kaikeyi"	1967	Prahelika
"Kaivariyude Thekkeyattam"	(NA)	Kaivariyude Thekkeyattam
"Kanneerummakal"	(NA)	—
"Kariyilakkattupole"	(NA)	—
"Kazhinja Vasanthakalathil"	1970	Aparan
"Khandavam"	1968	Aparan
"Kili Kizhavi"	1968	Aparan
"Kizhakke Muttathe Chempakamaram"	(NA)	—
"Kodathivishikku Shesham"	1969	Mattullavarute Venal
"Kunju"	1977	—
"Kure Kuttikal"	(NA)	Kaivariyude Thekkeyattam
"Lola"	1965	Aparan
"Manjukalathe Kakka"	1971	Pukakkannada
"Marangal"	(NA)	—
"Marimela"	1970	—
"Mattoru Bhoopradesham"	1974	—
"Mattullavarude Venal"	(NA)	Mattullavarude Venal
"Mazha"	1970	Pukakkannada
"Moovanthi"	1970	Prahelika
"Mrithi"	1969	Mattullavarude Venal
"Mrithyupathrathil Thiruthu"	1968	Pukakkannada
"Nakshathra Dukham"	1970	Prahelika
"Nammal Nagnakal"	(NA)	—
"Nee (Veendum) Nee Nee"	1970	Prahelika
"Njan Ninte Koode"	(NA)	—
"Ningalude Thazhvarangal Ningalkku"	1974	—

Name	Year	Book
"Nishashalabham"	(NA)	Kaivariyude Thekkeyattam
"Nizhal"	(NA)	—
"Ore Chandran"	(NA)	—
"Orma"	(NA)	—
"Oru Divasam Ucchakku"	(NA)	—
"Oru Dukhithante Dinangal"	(NA)	—
"Oru Pazhaya Satheerthya"	(NA)	—
"Oru Sameepakala Durantham"	1981	—
"Oru Sthree, Oru Purushan"	1970	Mattullavarude Venal
"Oru Vidhoorabandham"	1977	—
"Pakalukalolam Rathrikal"	(NA)	—
"Palunkumalika"	1970	Prahelika
"Pambu"	(NA)	Kaivariyude Thekkeyattam
"Pathayile Kaattu"	1970	Mattullavarude Venal
"Parvathikkutty"	1967	Aparan
"Pazhaya Katha"	1973	—
"Peppatti"	(NA)	—
"Poovum Thavalayum"	(NA)	—
"Prahelika"	1970	Prahelika
"Prasavam"	1970	Aparan
"Pretham"	(NA)	—
"Pukakkannada"	1969	Pukakkannada
"Pulayanarkkotta"	1970	Mattullavarude Venal
"Raghunathante Achan"	(NA)	—
"Raktham, Choru, Kannuneer"	(NA)	—
"Ranimarude Kudumbam"	(NA)	Kaivariyude Thekkeyattam
"Rathrichithram"	(NA)	—
"Rathriyile Mathram Suhruthukkal"	(NA)	—
"Rathriyum Pinneyoru Rathriyum"	(NA)	Kaivariyude Thekkeyattam
"Sahasika"	(NA)	Kaivariyude Thekkeyattam
"Samayogam"	(NA)	Kaivariyude Thekkeyattam
"Sankhapporul"	1975	—
"Sanmanassullavarkku; Vadhashiksha"	(NA)	Kaivariyude Thekkeyattam
"Sannipatham"	(NA)	—
"Sayahnasavari"	1976	—
"Shanthasooryan"	1973	—
"Shoorppanakha"	1970	Aparan
"Sree Gopalankutty"	1979	—
"Sundarikalum Sundarimarum"	1969	Mattullavarude Venal
"Swathanthrya Samaram"	1970	Pukakkannada
"Syphilisinte Nadakkavu"	1970	Pukakkannada
"Thakara"	1978	—
"Thanthrangalilonnu"	(NA)	—
"Theatre"	(NA)	—
"Theethali"	(NA)	—
"Thira, Theeram"	1970	Prahelika
"Thiruvullam Bodhippan"	(NA)	—
"Tholkkathe, Jayikkathe"	(NA)	—
"Thottavaril Oral"	(NA)	—
"Vanitha"	1971	Pukakkannada
"Velipadu Kondavar"	1975	—
"Veruthe Vesham"	1973	—
"Veyilil Doore"	(NA)	—
"Vicharana, Vidhi"	(NA)	—
"Vikalangar"	(NA)	Kaivariyude Thekkeyattam
"Viswasangalil Aviswasam"	(NA)	—
"Yauvanam Izhayumpol"	(NA)	—

== Films ==
Year	Original title	English title	Direction	Screenplay	Story	Notes
1975	Prayanam	The Journey		Yes	Yes	Directed by Bharathan.
1977	Itha Ivide Vare	Look! Till here		Yes	Yes	Based on the novel of the same name. Directed by I. V. Sasi.
1978	Nakshathrangale Kaaval	The Stars Alone Guard Me		Yes	Yes	Based on the novel of the same name. Directed by K. S. Sethumadhavan.
1978	Rappadikalude Gatha	The Song of the Nightingales		Yes	Yes	Directed by K. G. George.
1978	Rathinirvedam	Adolescent Desire		Yes	Yes	Based on the novel of the same name. Directed by Bharathan.
1978	Sathrathil Oru Rathri	A Night in an Inn		Yes	Yes	Directed by N. Sankaran Nair.
1978	Shalini Ente Koottukari	Shalini, My Friend		Yes	Yes	Directed by Mohan.
1978	Vadakakku Oru Hridayam	A Heart for Hire		Yes	Yes	Based on the novel of the same name. Directed by I. V. Sasi.
1979	Peruvazhiyambalam	Highway Shelter	Yes	Yes	Yes	Based on the novel of the same name.
1979	Kochu Kochu Thettukal	Minor Mistakes		Yes	Yes	Directed by Mohan.
1980	Thakara	Weed		Yes	Yes	Based on the short story of the same name. Directed by Bharathan.
1981	Oridathoru Phayalvaan	There Lived a Wrestler	Yes	Yes	Yes	Also edited the film.
1981	Kallan Pavithran	Pavithran, the Thief	Yes	Yes	Yes	Based on the novel of the same name.
1981	Lorry			Yes	Yes	Directed by Bharathan.
1982	Novemberinte Nashtam	November's Loss	Yes	Yes	Yes	
1982	Idavela	Interval		Yes	Yes	Directed by Mohan.
1983	Koodevide?	Whither the Nest	Yes	Yes		Based on the Tamil novel Moongil Pookkal by Vaasanthi.
1983	Kaikeyi			Yes	Yes	Based on the short story of the same name. Directed by I. V. Sasi.
1983	Eenam	Tune		Yes	Yes	Directed by Bharathan.
1984	Parannu Parannu Parannu	Soaring Soaring Soaring	Yes	Yes	Yes	
1984	Kanamarayathu	Beyond the Horizon		Yes	Yes	Directed by I. V. Sasi.
1985	Thinkalazhcha Nalla Divasam	Monday, an Auspicious Day	Yes	Yes		Based on the radio drama Ammakku Vendi by Sajini Pavithran.
1985	Ozhivukaalam	Vacation		Yes	Yes	Directed by Bharathan.
1985	Karimbinpoovinakkare	Across the Sugarcane Flowers		Yes	Yes	Directed by I. V. Sasi.
1986	Namukku Parkkan Munthiri Thoppukal	Vineyards for Us to Dwell	Yes	Yes		Based on the novel Nammukku Graamangalil Chennu Raappaarkkaam by K. K. Sudhakaran.
1986	Kariyila Kattu Pole	Like a Zephyr of Dry Leaves	Yes	Yes		Based on the radio drama Sisirathil Oru Prabhatham by Sudhakar Mangalodayam.
1986	Arappatta Kettiya Gramathil	In the Village Which Wears a Warrior's Belt	Yes	Yes	Yes	Based on the short story of the same name.
1986	Desatanakkili Karayarilla	The Migratory Bird Never Cries	Yes	Yes	Yes	
1986	Nombarathi Poovu	The Sorrowful Flower	Yes	Yes	Yes	
1987	Thoovanathumbikal	Butterflies of the Spraying Rain	Yes	Yes	Yes	Based on the novel Udakappola.
1988	Aparan	The Impostor	Yes	Yes	Yes	Loosely based on the short story of the same name. Story credited to Padmarajan and M. K. Chandrasekharan.
1988	Moonnam Pakkam	On the Third Day	Yes	Yes	Yes	
1989	Season		Yes	Yes	Yes	
1990	Innale	Yesterday	Yes	Yes		Based on the Tamil novel Punarjananam by Vaasanthi.
1990	Ee Thanutha Veluppan Kalathu	In These Cold Wee Hours		Yes	Yes	Directed by Joshi.
1991	Njan Gandharvan	I, Celestial Lover	Yes	Yes	Yes	
2005	Thanmathra	Molecule			Yes	Loosely based on the short story "Orma"
2011	Rathinirvedam	Venereal Disenchantment		Yes	Yes	Remake of the 1978 film of the same name. Directed by T. K. Rajeev Kumar.
