= Kerala Film Critics Association Award for Best Screenplay =

Annual Indian film award

The Kerala Film Critics Association Award for Best Screenplay is one of the annual awards given at the Kerala Film Critics Association Awards, honouring excellence in Malayalam cinema.

== Superlatives ==
Wins	Recipient(s)
9	P. Padmarajan
6	M. T. Vasudevan Nair
5	Lohithadas
3	Bobby-Sanjay; Sreenivasan
2	James Albert; Lenin Rajendran

== Winners ==
Year	Recipient	Film	Ref.
1977	P. Padmarajan	Itha Ivide Vare	
1978	M. T. Vasudevan Nair	Bandhanam	
1979	P. Padmarajan	Peruvazhiyambalam	
1980	M. T. Vasudevan Nair	Vilkkanundu Swapnangal	
1981	P. Padmarajan	Oridathoru Phayalvaan	
1982	P. Padmarajan	Novemberinte Nashtam	
1983	P. Padmarajan	Koodevide	
1984	M. T. Vasudevan Nair	Aalkkoottathil Thaniye	
1985	M. T. Vasudevan Nair	Anubandham	
1986	P. Padmarajan	Namukku Parkkan Munthirithoppukal	
1987	P. Padmarajan	Nombarathi Poovu, Thoovanathumbikal	
1988	P. Padmarajan	Aparan	
1989	Lohithadas	Dasharatham	
1990	P. Padmarajan	Innale	
1991	Lohithadas	Bharatham	
1992	John Paul	Savidham	
1993	Dennis Joseph	Akashadoothu	
1994	M. T. Vasudevan Nair	Sukrutham	
1995	Sreenivasan	Mazhayethum Munpe	
1996	Lohithadas	Sallapam, Thooval Kottaram	
1997	M. T. Vasudevan Nair	Ennu Swantham Janakikutty	
1998	Lohithadas	Ormacheppu	
1999	Lohithadas	Veendum Chila Veettukaryangal	
2000	Lenin Rajendran	Mazha	
2001	—	—	
2002	Sreenivasan	Yathrakarude Sradhakku	
2003	Bobby-Sanjay	Ente Veedu Appuvinteyum	
2004	Blessy	Kaazhcha	
2005	Aryadan Shoukath	Daivanamathil	
2006	James Albert	Classmates	
2007	Sreenivasan	Katha Parayumpol	
2008	Babu Janardhanan	Thalappavu	
2009	James Albert	Evidam Swargamanu	
2010	Ranjith	Pranchiyettan & the Saint	
2011	Bobby-Sanjay	Traffic	
2012	—	—	
2013	Anantha Padmanabhan	August Club	
2014	Bobby-Sanjay	How Old Are You?	
2015	Lenin Rajendran	Edavappathy	
2016	Vineeth Sreenivasan	Jacobinte Swargarajyam	
2017	Sajeev Pazhoor	Thondimuthalum Driksakshiyum	
2018	Mubi Huque	Khaleefa	
2019	Sajin Baabu	Biriyaani	
2020	Sachy	Ayyappanum Koshiyum	
2021	Jeethu Joseph	Drishyam 2	
2022	Shihabuddin Poythumkadavu	Bhoomiyude Uppu	
2022	Sunny Joseph	Bhoomiyude Uppu	
2022	Shruthi Sharanyam	B 32 Muthal 44 Vare	

== See also ==
- Kerala Film Critics Association Award for Best Story
- Kerala Film Critics Association Award for Best Director
