= Ajayan (director) =

Indian Malayalam film director (1950–2018)

Thoppil Ajayan
- Born: 8 April 1950; Vallikunnam, Alappuzha
- Died: 13 December 2018 (aged 68)
- Occupations: Playwright; Script writer; Film director
- Spouse: Dr. Sushama
- Relatives: Thoppil Bhasi (father)
- Writing career
- Language: Malayalam

Ajayan, also known as Thoppil Ajayan (8 April 1950 – 13 December 2018) was an Indian film director who is of note for his only feature film Perumthachan (The Master Carpenter). The film received positive reviews from critics worldwide. For this film, Ajayan won the Indira Gandhi Award for Best Debut Film of a Director and Kerala State Film Award for Best Debut Director in 1990. The film earned Santosh Sivan his first national award in cinematography The film also won the Kerala State Film Award for Best Popular Film in 1990 and was nominated for the Golden Leopard award at the Locarno International Film Festival in 1992.

In the afterword to his book The Master Carpenter, author M. T. Vasudevan Nair wrote that Ajayan first approached him for a screenplay of his story Manikkakkallu. That did not materialise and later he approached with another dream project Perumthachan. In the end of the afterword, M. T. thanked Ajayan for persuading him to write the screenplay for Perumthachan.

He died on 13 December 2018.

== Early life and career ==
Ajayan was the eldest son of film director and playwright Thoppil Bhasi. He secured a diploma in film technology from the Adyar Film Institute. He started as a camera assistant and later worked as an associate director with Thoppil Bhasi, Bharathan, Padmarajan and K. G. George.

== Filmography ==
=== Director ===
Year	Film
1991	Perumthachan

=== Assistant Director ===
Year	Film
1984	Panchavadi Palam
1984	Ente Upasana
1986	Oridathu
1987	Sarvakalashala

=== Chief Associate Director ===
Year	Film
1981	Oridathoru Phayalvaan
1982	Novemberinte Nashtam

=== Associate Director ===
Year	Film
1978	Rathinirvedam
1983	Koodevide
1986	Kariyilakkattu Pole

== Awards ==
National Film Awards

1. 1990: Indira Gandhi Award for Best Debut Film of a Director - Perumthachan

Kerala State Film Award

1. 1990: Kerala State Film Award for Best Film with Popular Appeal and Aesthetic Value - Perumthachan
2. 1990: Kerala State Film Award for Best Debut Director
