= Kerala State Film Award for Best Film with Popular Appeal and Aesthetic Value =

Annual Indian film award

Best Film with Popular Appeal and Aesthetic Value
- Awarded for: Best Malayalam film with popular appeal and aesthetic value
- Sponsored by: Kerala State Chalachitra Academy
- Reward: ₹200,000 (US$2,100)
- First award: 1976
- Final award: 2024
- Most recent winner: Premalu

Highlights
- Total awarded: 50
- First winner: Swami Ayyappan

The Best Film with Popular Appeal and Aesthetic Value is an award, begun in 1976, presented annually at the Kerala State Film Awards of India to the best film with popular appeal and aesthetic value in Malayalam film industry. Until 1997, the awards were managed directly by the Department of Cultural Affairs of the Government of Kerala. Since 1998, the awards have been controlled by the Kerala State Chalachitra Academy, an autonomous, non-profit institution functioning under the Department of Cultural Affairs. The winner, producer and director each receive a certificate, a statuette and a cash prize of ₹100,000.

== Superlatives ==
- Four wins: Antony Perumbavoor (producer)
- Four wins: Fazil (director, producer)
- Four wins: Ranjith (two as director and two as producer)
- Three wins: Sathyan Anthikkad (director)
- Three wins: P. V. Gangadharan (producer)

== Winners ==
No	Year	Film	Producer	Director
1	1975	Swami Ayyappan	P. Subramaniam	P. Subramaniam
2	1976	Mohiniyaattam	Raji Thampi	Sreekumaran Thampi
3	1977	Guruvayur Kesavan	M. O. Joseph	Bharathan
4	1978	Rappadikalude Gadha	M. Subramaniam	K. G. George
5	1979	Idavazhiyile Poocha Mindappoocha	Priyadarsini Films	Hariharan
6	1980	Manjil Virinja Pookkal	Navodaya Appachan	Fazil
7	1981	Gaanam	Sreekumaran Thampi	Sreekumaran Thampi
8	1982	No award		
9	1983	Koodevide	Prem Prakash	Padmarajan
10	1984	Nokkethadhoorathu Kannum Nattu	Ouseppachan, Khayas, Kurian	Fazil
11	1985	Yathra	Joseph Abraham	Balu Mahendra
12	1986	Ennennum Kannettante	Sajan	Fazil
13	1987	Oru Minnaminunginte Nurunguvettam	Gopinath Panthalam, Babu Thiruvalla	Bharathan
14	1988	1921	Mohammed Mannil	I. V. Sasi
15	1989	Oru Vadakkan Veeragatha	P. V. Gangadharan	Hariharan
16	1990	Perumthachan	G. Jayakumar	Ajayan
17	1991	Godfather	Swargachitra Appachan	Siddique-Lal
18	1992	Venkalam	V. V. Babu	Bharathan
19	1993	Manichitrathazhu	Swargachitra Appachan	Fazil
20	1994	Thenmavin Kombath	N. Gopalakrishnan	Priyadarshan
21	1995	Mazhayethum Munpe	Madhavan Nair	Kamal
22	1996	Kulam	V. S. Gangadharan	Lenin Rajendran
23	1997	Kaliyattam	K. Radhakrishnan (Jayalakshmy Films)	Jayaraj
24	1998	Chinthavishtayaya Shyamala	C. Karunakaran	Sreenivasan
25	1999	Veendum Chila Veettukaryangal	P. V. Gangadharan	Sathyan Anthikkad
26	2000	Devadoothan	Siyad Koker	Sibi Malayil
27	2001	Raavanaprabhu	Antony Perumbavoor	Ranjith
28	2002	Nammal	David Kachapilli	Kamal
29	2003	Ente Veedu Appuvinteyum	Prem Prakash	Sibi Malayil
30	2004	Kaazcha	Noushad Xavy, Manoj Mathew	Blessy
31	2005	Achuvinte Amma	P. V. Gangadharan	Sathyan Anthikkad
32	2006	Classmates	Prakash Damodaran, P. K. Muralidharan	Lal Jose
33	2007	Katha Parayumbol	Sreenivasan, Mukesh	M. Mohanan
34	2008	Innathe Chintha Vishayam	Antony Perumbavoor	Sathyan Anthikkad
35	2009	Evidam Swargamanu	Antony Perumbavoor	Rosshan Andrrews
36	2010	Pranchiyettan and the Saint	Ranjith	Ranjith
37	2011	Salt N' Pepper	Sadanandan Rangorath, Debobroto Mandal	Aashiq Abu
38	2012	Ayalum Njanum Thammil	Prem Prakash	Lal Jose
39	2013	Drishyam	Antony Perumbavoor	Jeethu Joseph
40	2014	Om Shanti Oshana	Alvin Antony	Jude Anthany Joseph
41	2015	Ennu Ninte Moideen	Suresh Raj, Binoy Shankarath, Ragy Thomas	R. S. Vimal
42	2016	Maheshinte Prathikaaram	Aashiq Abu	Dileesh Pothan
43	2017	Rakshadhikari Baiju Oppu	100th Monkey Movies	Ranjan Pramod
44	2018	Sudani from Nigeria	Sameer Thahir, Shyju Khalid	Zakariya Mohammed
45	2019	Kumbalangi Nights	Fahadh Faasil, Nazriya Nazim, Dileesh Pothan, Syam Pushkaran	Madhu C. Narayanan
46	2020	Ayyappanum Koshiyum	Ranjith, P.M Sasidharan	Sachy
47	2021	Hridayam	Visakh Subramaniam	Vineeth Sreenivasan
48	2022	Nna Thaan Case Kodu	Santhosh T. Kuruvilla	Ratheesh Balakrishnan Poduval
49	2023	Aadujeevitham	Visual Romance	Blessy
50	2024	Premalu	Fahadh Faasil, Dileesh Pothan, Syam Pushkaran	Girish A. D.
