= Prem Prakash =

Indian actor

- Born: 19 July 1943 (age 83)
- Occupation: Actor
- Years active: 1970–present
- Spouse: Daisy Luke
- Children: 3
- Parents: K. J. Joseph; Eliyamma Joseph
- Relatives: Jose Prakash (brother); Bobby-Sanjay (sons); Dennis Joseph (nephew)

Cherian Joseph, popularly known as Prem Prakash is an Indian actor who predominantly works in Malayalam television serials and a producer of Malayalam movies. He is mainly known for playing supporting and character roles. He has produced 19 Malayalam films. He is known as Kariachan amongst his family, friends and cinema circles.

== Career ==
Prem Prakash was educated in SB College Changanacherry and CMS College Kottayam. Premprakash made his acting debut in the movie Ara Nazhika Neram in 1970. He produced his first film Peruvazhiyambalam in 1979. It was the directorial debut of writer-director P. Padmarajan and also the debut of actor Ashokan. Peruvazhiyambalam was well received and Prakash went on to make 17 more films, of which films like Koodevide, Akashadoothu, Johnnie Walker, Ente Veedu Appuvinteyum and Ayalum Njanum Thammil firmly established him as a successful producer. He won the Best Character Actor Award at the 2015 Kerala State Film Awards for his role in Nirnayakam. He is also credited with introducing popular actors Rashin Rahman, Biju Menon, N F Varghese, Jyothirmayi, Achankunju, lyricist Gireesh Puthenchery, music director A J Joseph and director Jude Attipetty.

== Awards ==
National Film Awards

- 1979: National Film Award for Best Feature Film in Malayalam – Peruvazhiyambalam
- 1993: National Film Award for Best Feature Film in Malayalam – Aakashadoothu

Kerala State Film Awards

- 1979: Kerala State Film Award for Second Best Film – Peruvazhiyambalam
- 1983: Kerala State Film Award for Best Popular Film – Koodevide
- 2003: Kerala State Film Award for Best Popular Film – Ente Veedu Appuvinteyum
- 2012: Kerala State Film Award for Best Popular Film – Ayalum Njanum Thammil
- 2015: Kerala State Film Award for Best Character Actor – Nirnayakam

Film Producer's Association Award

- 2015: Best Character Actor – Nirnayakam

Film Critics Award

- 2015: Second Best Actor – Nirnayakam

Filmfare Awards South

- 2013: Best Film – Ayalum Njanum Thammil

Padmarajan Memorial Award

- 2013: Chalachitra Prathiba

== Filmography ==
=== As an actor ===
Year	Title	Role	Notes
1970	Aranazhika Neram		
1973	Panitheeraatha Veedu	Hari	
1973	Udayam	Unni	
1973	Thottavadi	Babu	
1974	Suprabhatham		
1974	Chattakkari		
1974	Shapamoksham		
1976	Seemantha Puthran		
1977	Aaraadhana		
1977	Aval Oru Devaalayam		
1978	Rappadikalude Gatha		
1978	Eeta	Abraham	
1981	Kallan Pavithran	Kuruppu	
1981	Oridathoru Phayalvaan		
1982	Idavela	Ravi's brother	
1983	Koodevide	Captain George	
1983	Prathijnja	Police Officer	
1985	Ente Kaanakkuyil	Driver	
1985	Onnanam Kunnil Oradi Kunnil	Balan	
1986	Ee Kaikalil	Police Officer	
1986	Kariyilakkattu Pole	Menon	
1989	Season	man coming to buy the TV	
1990	Orukkam	Kuttikrishnan	
1992	Johnnie Walker	Bobby's friend	
1993	Akashadoothu	Doctor	
1993	Maya Mayooram	Issac	
1994	Puthran	Avarachan	
1995	Highway	Sivanandan	
1997	Vamsam		
1999	Niram	Mathukutty	
2003	Ente Veedu Appuvinteyum		
2004	C. I. Mahadevan 5 Adi 4 Inchu	Minister	
2004	Kusruthi	'Kaduva' Narayanan	
2005	The Campus	Neena's father	
2006	Chinthamani Kolacase	Dr. Kim Sudarshan	
2006	Rashtram	Charles	
2006	Balram vs. Tharadas	CM Nandakumar	
2006	Moonnamathoral		
2006	Notebook	Swaminathan	
2007	Detective	CM Narayanan	
2009	Evidam Swargamanu	Jacob	
2010	Four Friends	Murali	
2010	Marykkundoru Kunjaadu	Doctor	
2011	Traffic	Doctor	
2012	Ee Adutha Kaalathu	Santhosh Kumar	
2012	Ustad Hotel	Bank Manager	
2012	Ayalum Njanum Thammil	Thomas Tharakan	
2013	Kadal Kadannu Oru Maathukutty	Zachariya	
2014	London Bridge	John Daniel	
2014	How Old Are You	Simon sir	
2014	Avatharam	Narendran	
2014	Angels	Channel Production Head	
2015	Nirnayakam	Adv. Siddarth Shankar	
2016	Vettah	Philip a.k.a. Appachan	
2016	Moonam Naal Njayarazhcha		
2017	Take Off	Jayamohan	
2018	Samaksham		
2018	Joseph	Cardiologist	
2018	Ira	IG Ajay Chacko IPS	
2019	Maarconi Mathaai		
2019	Valiyaperunnal	Popcorn Basheer	
2019	Evidey	Kuttichan	
2019	Uyare	Balakrishnan Nair	
2019	Brother's Day	Michael	
2020	Al Mallu	Sreenivas Sreedhar's father	
2021	Kaanekkaane	George	
2021	Enthada Saji	Puthenpurayil Augustine	
2023	Kolla	Bank Manager	
2023	Garudan	Samuel John	
2024	Ithuvare	Zachariah	
2024	Theeppori Benny	Chief Minister	
2024	Anweshippin Kandethum	Dr. Prajulachandran	

=== As a producer ===
- Peruvazhiyambalam (1979)
- Koodevide (1983)
- Parannu Parannu Parannu (1984)
- Ente Kaanakkuyil (1985)
- Kunjattakilikal (1986)
- Ee Kaikalil (1986)
- Orukkam (1990)
- Johnnie Walker (1992)
- Akashadoothu (1993)
- Puthran (1994)
- Highway (1995)
- Dilliwala Rajakumaran (1996)
- Nee Varuvolam (1997)
- Meenathil Thalikettu (1998)
- Njangal Santhushtaranu (1999)
- Ente Veedu Appoontem (2003)
- Sankaranum Mohananum (2011)
- Ayalum Njanum Thammil (2012)
- Evidey (2019)

=== As playback singer ===
- Kaarthika Nakshathrathe as Kaarthika (1968)

== Television career ==
Year	Title	Role	Actor	Producer	Channel	Notes
2001	Avasthantharangal			Yes	Kairali TV	
2003–2004	Swapnam	Vishwanathan	Yes		Asianet	
2004–2005	Avicharitham	Aravind	Yes	Yes	Asianet	
2005	Ariyathe		Yes		Asianet	
2006	Oru Mandarappoovu	Achan	Yes		Asianet	
2006	Manaporutham	Achan	Yes		Asianet	
2007	Manapporutham	Achan			Surya TV	
2006-2007	Amma Manassu	Issa's father	Yes		Asianet	
2008	Mandaram	Hariharan	Yes		Kairali TV	
2009	Alphonsamma	perappan	Yes		Asianet	
2009	Aagneyam		Yes	Yes	DD Malayalam	
2011–2013	Akashadoothu	Joy	Yes		Surya TV	
2010–2012	Indraneelam	Balachandran	Yes		Surya TV	
2012	Sandhyaraagam	Saudamini's father	Yes		Amrita TV	
2013	red roses		Yes		Asianet	
2013	Bahumanapetta Bharya		Yes		DD Malayalam	
2013	Oru penninte kadha		Yes		Mazhavil Manorama	
2014	Avalude Kadha		Yes		Surya TV	
2015	Iswaran Sakshiyayi	Mahendran	Yes		Flowers (TV channel)	
2015	Streetvam		Yes		Surya TV	
2016	Mizhi Randilum	Krishnamangalath Appu mash	Yes		Surya TV	
2016	Jagratha	Vishwanathan	Yes		Amrita TV	
2017–2018	Nokketha Doorathu	Achu's father	Yes		Mazhavil Manorama	
2020	Padatha Painkili	Anandavarma	Yes		Asianet	Replaced by Dinesh Panicker

== Books ==
- Prakashavarshangal (Autobiography)
