= Johnson (composer) =

Indian composer (1953–2011)

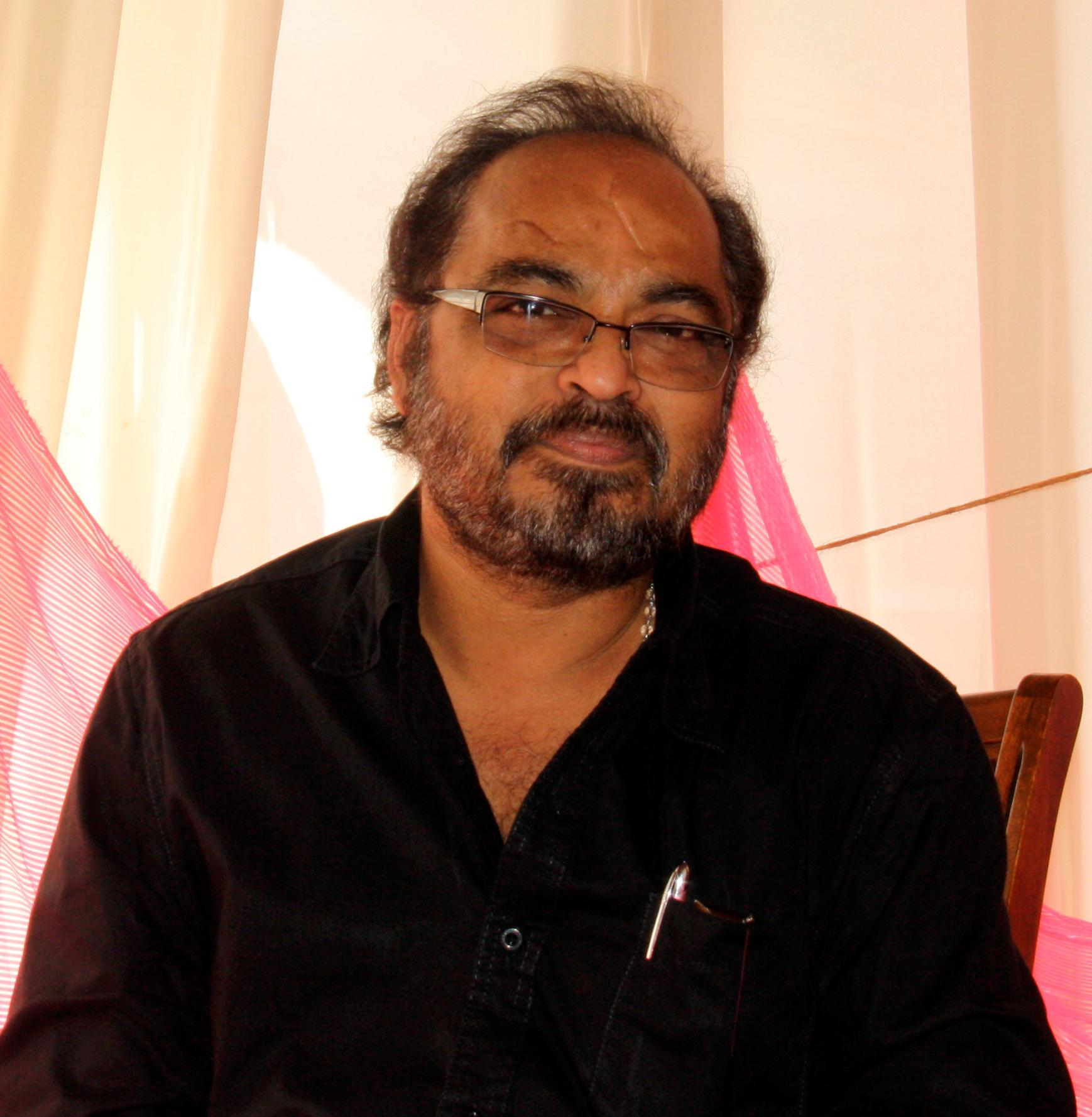

Background information
- Also known as: Johnson Master
- Born: T. A. Johnson; 26 March 1953; Trichur, Travancore-Cochin, India
- Died: 18 August 2011 (aged 58) Chennai, Tamil Nadu, India
- Genres: Film score; world music
- Occupations: Composer: music director; instrumentalist; singer
- Instruments: Harmonium; guitar; flute; drums; violin; accordion
- Years active: 1978–2011

Thattil Antony Johnson (26 March 1953 – 18 August 2011), popularly known as Johnson Master, was an Indian film score composer and music director. Regarded as one of the finest composers in the industry, he was noted for his lyrical and expressive melodies together with simple but rich tonal compositions of thematic music. Johnson is a recipient of National Film Awards twice and Kerala State Film Awards five times. He composed music for more than 300 Malayalam films, the most by any composer except for G. Devarajan. He was the first music director from Malayalam cinema to be honoured with the National film Awards.He composed music for some of the most important motion pictures of Malayalam cinema, including Koodevide, Namukku Paarkkan Munthiri Thoppukal, Oru Minnaminunginte Nurunguvettam, Vadakkunokkiyantram, Perumthachan, Njan Gandharvan, Ponthan Mada, and Bhoothakkannadi.

== Early life ==
Johnson was born in Nellikkunnu near Trichur (Thrissur) in the state of Travancore-Cochin (now part of Kerala), on 26 March 1953. His father, the late Thattil Antony, was a bank employee. His secondary education was at St. Thomas School in Thope, Trichur. Johnson was a singer in the choir of Nellikkunnu St. Sebastian's Church. He used to sing in youth festivals and musical shows and joined the orchestra team of some local troupes and played harmonium in many concerts. He also used to sing in female voice in ganamelas (a stage show where film songs are sung by amateur or professional artists).

Within a few years, the club became one of the most sought after musical troupes in Kerala, and had more than fifty members. This club used to give accompaniment music to playback singers Jayachandran and Madhuri in their musical shows. It was Jayachandran who introduced Johnson to G. Devarajan, one of the most prolific composers of South Indian cinema then. Devarajan literally adopted Johnson and brought him to Chennai in 1974. Johnson bought an accordion, during this period, from R. K. Shekhar (A. R. Rahman's father), and began assisting Devarajan in filmscoring and composing.

== Film scoring and soundtracks ==
Johnson began his independent career by composing the film scores of Bharathan's Aaravam (1978), Thakara (1980) and Chamaram (1980). He composed his first soundtracks for the film Inaye Thedi, debut film of director turned still photographer Antony Eastman and actress Silk Smitha. It was Devarajan himself, who suggested Johnson try his hand at direction. Then came Bharathan's Parvathi and Balachandra Menon's Premageethangal. Premageethangal was a notable success with four of its songs – "Swapnam Verumoru Swapnam", "Nee Nirayoo Jeevanil", "Muthum Mudipponnum" and "Kalakalamozhi" attaining cult status.

He came to prominence through his collaboration with Malayalam author and director Padmarajan. Koodevide was their first venture, which had one of the most famous songs of Johnson "Aadivaa Kaatte", a pathbreaking song in Malayalam music history. It was one of the first songs in Malayalam to so many western classical elements. The song was born out of Padmarajan's need for a western song for his innovative film. Song composition took place in Woodland's Hotel, Chennai. Another notable feature of this song was the lyrics by O. N. V. Kurup, who for the first time wrote lyrics for a pre-composed song. Johnson worked for 11 films with Padmarajan, including his last film Njan Gandharvan. This productive collaboration saw the detailed screenplay and cinematography of Padmarajan become a fertile ground for expressive musical narration and thematic scores for Johnson. This is seen in some of the greatest motion pictures of Malayalam cinema, like Nombarathipoovu (1987). Another notable collaboration of Johnson was with director Sathyan Anthikkad, with whom he associated in almost 25 films. He was able to provide some of his most popular songs with Anthikkad and this combo is widely accepted to be one of the greatest director-composer collaborations in Malayalam cinema. Acclaimed Malayalam director Bharathan also collaborated with him in multiple films including Parvathy, Palangal, Ormakkayi, Kattathe Kilikkoodu, Ente Upasana, Oru Minnaminunginte Nurunguvettam, Ozhivukalam, Malootty, Chamayam and Churam. His major other collaborations with directors include Mohan (Oru Katha Oru Nunakkatha, Sakshyam, Pakshe and Angane Oru Avadhikkalathu), Sibi Malayil (Kireedam, Chenkol, Dasaratham and Nee Varuvolam), Sreenivasan (Vadakkunokkiyantram and Chinthavishtayaya Shyamala), Lohithadas (Bhoothakkannadi, Kamal (Peruvannapurathe Visheshangal, Shubhayathra, Ee Puzhayum Kadannu and Paavam Paavam Rajakumaran), and Balachandra Menon (Shesham Kazhchayil, Premageethangal, Kilukilukkam, Kelkatha Shabdam and Nayam Vyakthamakkunnu).

He is also noted for his collaboration with the Malayalam lyricist Kaithapram Damodaran Namboothiri. Their association began in 1989 with Sathyan Anthikkad's social satire Varavelpu. Most of Johnson's notable works were in the late eighties and early nineties. In 1991, he scored a record number of 31 films, including 29 with Kaithapram. Johnson won National awards for two consecutive years. He won his first National Award for best music direction for the motion picture Ponthan Mada (1993). The next year he got his second National award for Sukrutham for the background score.

After an extremely successful career of more than a decade, Johnson took a sabbatical from film scoring by the end of the nineties. The quantity of his works began perishing during this time. By the beginning of the 2000s, he didn't sign any new projects that even his most noted collaborator Sathyan Anthikkad had to find a new composer. In 2003 he did the background score for the NFDC movie Parinamam (The Change) directed by P. Venu.In 2004, he sang the song "Theekuruvi" from Kangalal Kaidhu Sei, which was composed by A. R. Rahman. Perhaps it is the only song recorded by him for any composer other than himself. He returned strongly to the field with Photographer in 2006, which fetched him numerous awards.

== Non-cinematic outputs ==
Johnson released four non-film albums. His first album Sneha Deepika was released in 1989 on Tharangini audios. It had nine Christian devotional songs – "Aathma Swaroopa", "Unni Yesu Pirannu", "Manninum Poovinum", "Thumbapoo Polulla", "Bhoomikku Pulakam", "Manassakumengil", "Kulir Choodum", "Arthungal Innoru" and "Vidarnna Punchiri". The featured artists were K. J. Yesudas, K. S. Chithra and Sujatha. His second album Onathappan, a collaboration with M. G. Radhakrishnan and Berny-Ignatius, consisted of nine festival songs. The track "Mundon Paadam" was composed by Johnson, sung by M. G. Sreekumar and had lyrics penned by Bichu Thirumala. His third album Nannipoorvam Johnson, consisted of twelve tracks – "Chandanakkavilinnu", "Panineeru Peyyum", "Vasundhare", "Virunnu Vanna", "Prapanjam Sundaram", "Enthe Nee Varathe", "Nilasandhyayil", "Veruthe Onnu", "Ponnazhikkuttu", "Pranayappirave", "Kalindhi", and an introductory speech by Sreenivasan. The lyricists were R. K. Damodaran, Gireesh Puthenchery, Kaithapram, Bichu Thirumala, M. D. Rajendran, K. Jayakumar, S. Ramesan Nair and Poovachal Khader and the songs were rendered by K. J. Yesudas, P. Jayachandran, K. S. Chithra, M. G. Sreekumar, Aparna Rajeev, Dr. Rashmi Madhu and Johnson himself. In 2009, he released his second Christian devotional album entitled Parishudhan. It had eleven tracks – "Vazhiyum Sathyavum Nee Thanne (Vijay Yesudas), "Mullukal Kuthi" (Chithra), "Ariyathe Polum" (G. Venugopal), "Neethimanayavane" (Sujatha), "Traditional song" (Louis), "Mazhayum Veyilum" (Rimi Tomy), "Oru Viral Sparshathal (Sudheep), "Loka Palaka" (Chithra), Neethanthamam (Vijay Yesudas), and "Kannukalil Theliyum" (Manjari).

== Music style and impact ==
His skilful integration of textual rhythm of the lyrics together with rich tonal arrangement, redefined songwriting in Malayalam cinema, since the late 1980s. In his film scores, Johnson combines native South Indian melodic patterns with the harmonic structure of classical music and this has attained an expressive form of narration through film score. He composed for about 300 films, making him the second most composed music director in Malayalam, after his guru G. Devarajan. Though he has obtained no formal training in classical music, he was able to incorporate the beauty of Carnatic ragas in his songs. Most of his songs were composed on Kalyani raga.

Johnson's favourite male singer was K. J. Yesudas, who has recorded many songs for him, while S. Janaki and K. S. Chithra were his favourite female singers. Chithra had some of her most noted songs with Johnson.

Johnson is fondly called Johnson Master (Johnson Mashu) by Malayalee audiences. Even his contemporaries and competitors refer him with the tag 'Master' ('mash' in Malayalam).

His background scoring style has a cult following. His scores from Thoovanathumbikal, Namukku Parkkan Munthirithoppukal, Manichitrathazhu, Thaniyavarthanam, Chitram, Bharatham, Aparan, Kireedam, Sukrutham are considered to be amongst the best.

=== Awards ===
Johnson won his first National Film Award for the Best Music Direction for the film Ponthan Mada (1994) and the very next year he won his second National film award for the Best Background score for the film Sukrutham (1995) He was the first Malayalee music composer to receive a National award in music category and is also the only Malayalee music director who received two national awards in music category. This film has one song Adimarunge ayyayya (അടിമരുങ്ങേ അയ്യയ്യാ) lyrics by O. N. V. Kurup and sung by K. S. Chithra and chorus composed by Johnson. This is a folk song. National film award committee noted that he brilliantly integrated western folk tunes into this song. The award was given for best music direction and background score of this film. He received three Kerala State Film Award for Best Music Director, for the films Ormakkayi (1982), Vadakkunokkiyantram and Mazhavil Kavadi (1989), and Angane Oru Avadhikkalathu (1999). He was awarded the Kerala State Film Award for Best Background Music for the films Sadayam (1992) and Sallapam (1996). He has thus received five Kerala State Film Awards in music category, an achievement he shares with Devarajan. He has received the Kerala Film Critics Awards four times, the most recent in 2008 for Gulmohar. In 2007, he won the Mathruboomi Award for Best Music Director for Photographer (2006). He won the Mullasserry Raju Music Award for the song "Enthe Kannanu Karuppu Niram", also from the same film. In addition, he received numerous other awards and nominations including Devarajan Master Memorial Award and Raveendran Master Memorial Award.

== Death ==
Johnson died at his home in Chennai on 18 August 2011 at the age of 58, due to a massive heart attack. He was survived by his wife Rani Johnson, son Renn Johnson and daughter Shan Johnson. Renn Johnson died on 25 February 2012 in a motorbike accident in Chennai. Shan Johnson, a trained singer and musician, died of a cardiac arrest at her flat in Chennai on 5 February 2016. They are interred at the St Sebastian's church cemetery in Nellikunnu, Thrissur.

== Partial discography ==
=== Original scores and soundtracks ===
Year	Album
1979	Cheriyachante Kroorakrithyangal
1981	Premageethangal
1981	Oridathoru Phayalvaan
1981	Inaye Thedi
1981	Raktham
1981	Chaatta
1981	Parvathi
1982	Football
1982	Sooryan
1982	Ithiri Neram Othiri Karyam
1982	Kelkatha Shabdam
1982	Palangal
1982	Kilukilukkam
1982	Swarna Gopuram
1982	Ithu Njangalude Kadha
1982	Ormakkayi
1982	Thuranna Jail
1983	Koodevide
1983	Shesham Kaazhchayil
1983	Kolakomban
1983	Onnu Chirikku
1983	Kattathe Kilikkoodu
1983	Naseema
1983	Thamburu
1983	Thavalam
1983	Ivide Thudangunnu
1984	Parannu Parannu Parannu
1984	Sandarbham
1984	Ente Upasana
1984	Swanthamevide Bandhamevide
1985	Akkacheyude Kunjuvava
1985	Nerariyum Nerathu
1985	Oru Kudakkeezhil
1985	Makan Ente Makan
1985	Katha Ithuvare
1985	Mounanombaram
1985	Upaharam
1985	Sannaham
1985	Jwalanam
1985	Oduvil Kittiya Vartha
1985	Aa Neram Alppa Dooram
1985	Ozhivukalam
1986	Namukku Parkkan Munthiri Thoppukal
1986	Oru Katha Oru Nunnakkatha
1986	Neram Pularumpol
1986	Akalangalil
1986	Kariyila Kattu Pole
1986	Ice Cream
1986	Malamukalile Daivam
1986	Ente Entethumathram
1986	Thidambu
1987	Oru Minnaminunginte Nurunguvettam
1987	Sruthi
1987	Athinumappuram
1987	Ithente Needhi
1987	Arinjo Ariyatheyo
1987	Onnam Manam Poomanam
1987	Archana Pookkal
1987	Kathirippinte Thudakkam
1988	Aparan
1988	Unnikrishnante Adyathe Christmas
1988	Ponmuttayidunna Tharavu
1988	Isabella
1989	Peruvannapurathe Visheshangal
1989	Varavelpu
1989	Varnatheru
1989	Radham
1989	Nerunnu Nanmakal
1989	Lal Americayil
1989	Kireedam
1989	Artham
1989	Dasaratham
1989	Vadakkunokkiyantram
1989	Mazhavilkavadi
1989	Pradeshika Varthakal
1989	Pandu Pandoru Desathu
1990	Nanma Niranjavan Sreenivasan
1990	Malootty
1990	Paavakkoothu
1990	Varthamanakaalam
1990	Muppathi Randam Naal
1990	Shubhayathra
1990	Sunday 7 PM
1990	Sandram
1990	Dr. Pasupathy
1990	Kalikkalam
1990	Gajakesariyogam
1990	Rajavazhcha
1990	Kouthuka Vaarthakal
1990	Ee Kanni Koodi
1990	Cheriya Lokavum Valiya Manushyarum
1990	Niyamam Endu Cheyyum
1990	Orukkam
1990	Thalayanamanthram
1990	Pavam Pavam Rajakumaran
1990	Kaattukuthira
1990	Sasneham
1990	Mridula
1990	Mukham
1990	Ananthanum Appukkuttanum Anayundu
1990	Khalasi
1991	Kakka Thollayiram
1991	Sundari Kakka
1991	Nettipattam
1991	Beli
1991	Chanchaattam
1991	Perunthachan
1991	Kankettu
1991	Ezhunnaallathu
1991	Mimics Parade
1991	Athiradhan
1991	Arangu
1991	Kanal Kaattu
1991	Innathe Program
1991	Karpoora Deepam
1991	Aanaval Mothiram
1991	Sandhesam
1991	Apoorvam Chilar
1991	Ennum Nanmakal
1991	Njaan Gandharvan
1991	Nagarathil Samsaaravishayam
1991	Venal Kinavukal
1991	Cheppukilukkana Changaathi
1991	Nayam Vyakthamakkunnu
1992	My Dear Muthachan
1992	Thalasthanam
1992	Kunukkkitta Kozhi
1992	Mahanagaram
1992	Kasargode Khadarbhai
1992	Snehasaagaram
1992	Oottyppattanam
1992	Aadharam
1992	Maanthrika Cheppu
1992	Ezharapponnana
1992	Savidham
1992	Kudumba Sametham
1992	Neelakkurukkan
1992	Sadayam
1992	Poochaikkaru Manikettum
1992	Aayaram Gayaram
1992	Ambathu Lakshavum Maruthi Carum
1993	Addheham Enna Iddheham
1993	Golanthara Vartha
1993	Samooham
1993	Ghoshayaathra
1993	Ente Sreekuttiku
1993	Maanavam
1993	Samaagamam
1993	Chenkol
1993	Agneyam
1993	O' Faby
1993	Meleparambil Aanveedu
1993	Chamayam
1993	Naaraayam
1993	Thalamura
1993	Paamaram
1994	CID Unnikrishnan B.A., B.Ed.
1994	Rajadhaani
1994	Pakshe
1994	Ponthan Mada
1994	The City
1994	Kudumba Visesham
1994	Sandanagopaalam
1994	Manathe Vellitheru
1994	Bhagyavan
1994	Chakoram
1994	Pingami
1994	Malappuram Haji Mahanaaya Joji
1994	Kunjikkili
1994	Leader
1995	Ezharakuttam
1995	Saadaram
1995	Ormakal Undaayirikkanam
1995	Kaattile Thadi Thevarude Aana
1995	Mangalam Veettil Manaseswari Gupta
1995	Sunny Scooter
1995	Sakshyam
1995	Thovala Pookkal
1996	Ee Puzhayum Kadannu
1996	Kanchanam
1996	Thooval Kottaram
1996	Udhyanapalakan
1996	Sallapam
1996	Aayiram Naavulla Ananthan
1996	Kalyana Sougandhikam
1997	Irattakuttikalude Achan
1997	Killikurisiyile Kudumbhamela
1997	Adivaaram
1997	Bhoothakannadi
1997	Manthra Mothiram
1997	Kudamattam
1997	Sankeerthanam Pole
1997	Guru Sishyan
1997	Oral Mathram
1997	Itha Oru Snehagatha
1997	Churam
1997	Manasam
1997	Nee Varuvolam
1997	Snehasindhooram
1997	Rishyasringan
1997	Athyunnathangalil Koodaram Panithavar
1997	Vachalam
1997	Sammanam
1998	Aayushmaanbhava
1998	Manjukaalavum Kazhinju
1998	Vismayam
1998	Chinthavishtayaya Shyamala
1998	Ormacheppu
1998	Kusrithikuruppu
1998	Thirakalkkappuram
1998	Mangamma
1999	Angane Oru Avadikkalathu
1999	Veendum Chila Veettukaryangal
2000	Swayamvara Panthal
2000	Susanna
2000	Ee Mazha Thenmazha
2000	Oru Cheru Punchiri
2001	Narendran Makan Jayakanthan Vaka
2001	Uthaman
2001	The Gift of God
2001	Police Academy
2002	Yathrakarude Sradhakku
2002	Dany
2002	Stop Violence
2002	Suvarna Mohangal
2003	Parinamam (The Change)
2003	Paadam Onnu: Oru Vilapam
2006	Kisan
2006	Photographer
2007	AKG
2008	Gulmohar
2009	Vellathooval
2011	Nadakame Ulakam
2011	Anandhan Pillai Adhava Arjunan Pillai
2011	Bharyamar Adharikkapedunnu
2011	Khilafath
2012	Navagatharkku Swagatham

=== Original scores ===
The following lists out the films in which Johnson composed the background score but not songs.

- Aakaashakottayile Sulthaan
- Aalorungi Arangorungi
- Aaraante Mulla Kochumulla
- Aaravam
- Aaryan
- Arabikkadal
- Abhimanyu
- Adimachangala
- Agnisharam
- Ambada Njaane
- Amaram
- Amrutham
- Arayannangalude Veedu
- Avidatheppole Ivideyum
- Bharatham
- Chamaram
- Chithram
- Chakravalam Chuvannappol
- Chithrathoonukal
- Dhanam
- Dheem Tharikidathom
- Ee Kaikalil
- Ekantham
- English Medium
- Ente Hridayathinte Udama
- Ente Kaanakkuyil
- Ithum Oru Jeevitham
- Iniyum Kurukshethram
- Kaanaakkinaavu
- Kaarunyam
- Kaaryam Nissaaram
- Kadathanadan Ambadi
- Kadaksham
- Kamaladalam
- Kazhukan
- Keli
- Kaikudanna Nilavu
- Kissan
- Kinnarippuzhayoram
- Kodumudikal
- Koodum Thedi
- Krishnapakshakkilikal
- Kudumbapuraanam
- Kunjaattakkilikal
- Maayamayooram
- Madhya Venal
- Manasiloru Manimuthu
- Manichithrathazhu
- Mankamma
- Mizhineerppoovukal
- Mukunthetta Sumitra Vilikkunnu
- Mizhi Randilum
- Mounanombaram
- No. 1 Snehatheeram Bangalore North
- Nokketha Dhoorathu Kannum Nattu
- Nombarathi Poovu
- Nyayavidhi
- Orma Mathram
- Ottayal Pattaalam
- Oru Cheru punchiri
- Puzha
- Paadamudra
- Parinayam
- Pooram
- Post Box Number 27
- Pradakshinam
- Raagam Thaanam Pallavi
- Shreeraagam
- Snehapoorvam Meera
- Sukrutham
- Susanna
- Soorya Gaayathri
- Thalavattam
- Thazhvaram
- Thakara
- Thaniyavarthanam
- Theekkaattu
- Thoovanathumbikal
- Uncle Bun
- Uthara
- Utharam
- Vadhu Doctoraanu
- Vaadakaveettile Athidhi
- Vandanam
- Valkannadi
- Vellanakalude Nadu
- Vedikkett
- Venkalam
- Vishnulokam

=== As Playback Singer ===
As Playback Singer
Year	Track	Album	Composer	Lyricist	Language
1982	Aasane Ponnasane	Football	Johnson	Shyam Krishna	Malayalam
1991	Aduppoodhum	Naathu Nattaachu	Rajamani	Kalidasan	Tamil
1992	Verumoru Moshtavaya Enne	Cheppadividya	S.P. Venkatesh	K. Ayyappa Panicker	Malayalam
1993	Paadippokaam	Samagamam	Johnson	O.N.V. Kurup	Malayalam
1993	Naadodi Koothadan Vaa	Paamaram	Johnson	Bichu Thirumala	Malayalam
1995	Aaraaro Aariraro	Thovalappookkal	Johnson	Kaithapram Damodaran Namboothiri	Malayalam
1998	Mookkilla Naakkilla	Vismayam	Johnson	Raghunath Paleri	Malayalam
2000	Himabinduvayi	Susanna	Johnson	K. Jayakumar	Malayalam
2004	Theekuruvi	Kangalal Kaidhu Sei	A. R. Rahman	Thenmozhi	Tamil
2006	Pulchaadi	Photographer	Johnson	Kaithapram Damodaran Namboothiri	Malayalam
2006	Ammaanam Chemmaanam	Kisan	Johnson	Gireesh Puthenchery	Malayalam
2008	Thaazhe Paadam	Gulmohur	Johnson	O.N.V. Kurup	Malayalam

=== Non-film albums ===
Independent Albums
Year	Album	Lyricist	Label
1987	Sabarigeetham	Mankombu Gopalakrishnan, N. K. Ravendran, Muttom Gopinath	RJ Series
1989	Sneha Deepika		Tharangini Records
1992	Onathappam	Bichu Thirumala	Ranjini
2002	Nandipoorvam Johnson		Tichus Audios
2009	Parishudhan	O.N.V Kurup, Gireesh Puthenchery	Zion Classics
2011	Rajavu Ezhunnallunnu		Manorama Music

=== Notable songs ===
In an interview with Malayala Manorama, Johnson listed the following 13 songs as his favourite songs.

- "Aadivaa Katte" (Koodevide)
- "Nee Nirayoo Jeevanil" (Premageethangal)
- "Swapnam Verumoru Swapnam" (Premageethangal)
- "Poo Venam" (Oru Minnaminunginte Nurunguvettam)
- "Melle Melle Mukhapadam" (Oru Minnaminunginte Nurunguvettam)
- "Gopike Nin Viral" (Kattathe Kilikkoodu)
- "Devankanangal" (Njan Gandharvan)
- "Swarna mukile" (Ithu Njangaludey Kadha)
- "Thankathoni" (Mazhavilkavadi)
- "Sundari Poovinu Naanam" (Ente Upasana)
- "Shyamambharam" (Artham)
- "Enthe Kannanu Karuppu Niram" (Photographer)
- "Oru Naal" (Gulmohar)

== Accolades ==
=== National Film Awards ===
Year	Category	Film	Notes
1993	Best Music Direction	Ponthan Mada	
1994	Best Music Direction	Sukrutham	Background score only

=== Kerala State Film Awards ===
Year	Category	Film
1982	Best Music Direction	Ormakkayi
1989	Best Music Direction	Mazhavilkavadi, Vadakkunokkiyanthram
1992	Best Background Music	Sadayam
1996	Best Background Music	Sallapam
1999	Best Music Direction	Angene Oru Avadhikkalathu

=== Kerala Film Critics Association Awards ===
Year	Category	Film
1983	Best Music Director	Koodevide
1988	Best Music Director	Isabella, Ponmuttayidunna Tharavu
1992	Best Music Director	Savidham, Kudumbasametham
1996	Best Music Director	Sallapam, Ee Puzhayum Kadannu
2008	Best Music Director	Gulmohar

== Notes ==
21.^ https://youtube.com/VVc3qiSW0gc?si=pq-uxaTwd-kSNKBd Medley of Jhonson Master's Background scores by www.m3db.com (Malayalam Movie & Music Database)
