= Kerala State Film Award for Best Music Director – Songs =

Annual Indian film award

The Kerala State Film Award for Best Music Director in a Malayalam film is presented annually at the Kerala State Film Awards.

== Superlatives ==
Superlative	Best Direction	
Most awards	M. Jayachandran	9 awards
Second most awards	Devarajan & M. B. Sreenivasan	4 awards

== Winners ==
†	Indicates a joint award for that year

Year	Image	Music director	Film
1969		Devarajan	Kumara Sambhavam, Kadalpalam
1970		Devarajan	Thriveni
1971		V. Dakshinamoorthy	Vilakku Vangiya Veena, Marunattiloru Malayali & Muthassi
1972		Devarajan	Chembarathi, Maram
1973 †		K. Raghavan	Nirmalyam (Songs)
1973 †		M. B. Sreenivasan	Nirmalyam (Background music)
1974		M. S. Viswanathan	Chandrakantham, Jeevikkan Marannupoya Sthree
1975		Bhaskar Chandavarkar	Swapnadanam
1976		A. T. Ummer	Aalinganam
1977		K. Raghavan	Poojakkedukkatha Pookkal
1978		M. B. Sreenivasan	Bandhanam
1979		M. B. Sreenivasan	Edavazhiyile Poocha Minda Poocha, Ulkkadal
1980		Jerry Amaldev	Manjil Virinja Pookkal
1981		M. B. Sreenivasan	Different Films
1982		Johnson	Ormakkayi
1983		Shyam	Aaroodam
1984		Shyam	Kanamarayathu
1985		Devarajan	Chidambaram
1986		Bombay Ravi	Nakhakshathangal
1987		Ouseppachan	Unnikale Oru Kadha Parayam
1988		G. Aravindan	Ore Thooval Pakshikal
1989		Johnson	Mazhavilkavadi, Vadakkunokkiyantram
1990 †		Perumbavoor G. Raveendranath	Innale
1990 †		Jerry Amaldev	Aparahnam
1991		Raveendran	Bharatham
1992		Bombay Ravi	Sargam
1993		S. P. Venkatesh	Paithrukam, Janam
1994		Berny-Ignatious	Thenmavin Kombath
1995		Illayaraja	Kalapani
1996		Vidyasagar	Azhakiya Ravanan
1997		Kaithapram	Karunyam
1998		Vidyasagar	Pranayavarnangal
1999		Johnson	Angene Oru Avadhikkalathu
2000		Vidyasagar	Devadoothan
2001		M. G. Radhakrishnan	Achaneyanenikkishtam
2002		Raveendran	Nandanam
2003		M. Jayachandran	Gaurisankaram
2004		M. Jayachandran	Perumazhakkalam, Kathavasheshan
2005		M. G. Radhakrishnan	Ananthabadram
2006		Ramesh Narayan	Rathri Mazha
2007		M. Jayachandran	Nivedyam
2008		M. Jayachandran	Madambi
2009		Mohan Sithara	Sufi Paranja Katha
2010		M. Jayachandran	Karayilekku Oru Kadal Dooram
2011		Sharreth	Ivan Megharoopan
2012		M. Jayachandran	Celluloid
2013		Ouseppachan	Nadan
2014		Ramesh Narayan	White Boys
2015		Ramesh Narayan	Ennu Ninte Moideen, Edavapathy
2016		M. Jayachandran	Kambhoji
2017		M. K. Arjunan	Bhayanakam
2018		Vishal Bhardwaj	Carbon
2019		Sushin Shyam	Kumbalangi Nights
2020		M. Jayachandran	Sufiyum Sujatayum
2021		Hesham Abdul Wahab	Hridayam
2022		M. Jayachandran	Pathonpatham Noottandu; Ayisha
2023		Justin Varghese	Chaaver
2024		Sushin Shyam	Bougainvillea

=== Special Jury Award and Special Jury Mention In This Category ===
Year	Image	Recipient(s)	Award	Film(s)
1985		Anand Sankar	Special Jury Award	Pururavas
1987		M. B. Sreenivasan	Special Jury Award	Swathi Thirunal (film)
2013		Afzal Yusuf	Special Mention	God for Sale, Immanuel (film)
2014		Yakzan Gary Pereira	Special Mention	Iyobinte Pusthakam
2014		Neha Nair	Special Mention	Iyobinte Pusthakam
2019		V. Dakshinamoorthy (posthumously)	Special Mention	Shyamaragam

== Most Awards ==
Music director	No. of wins
M. Jayachandran	9
Devarajan; M.B. Sreenivasan	4
Johnson; Vidyasagar; Ramesh Narayan	3
Ouseppachan; M.G. Radhakrishnan; Bombay Ravi; Shyam; K. Raghavan; Jerry Amaldev; Raveendran; Sushin Shyam	2
