= Deshadanakkili Karayarilla =

1986 film by P. Padmarajan

- Theatrical release poster
- Directed by: Padmarajan
- Written by: Padmarajan
- Starring: Mohanlal; Karthika; Shari; Urvashi
- Cinematography: Venu
- Edited by: B. Lenin
- Music by: S. P. Venkatesh (Score); Raveendran (Songs)
- Production company: Burton Movies
- Distributed by: Dinny Films
- Release date: 14 February 1986
- Country: India
- Language: Malayalam

Deshadanakkili Karayarilla (transl. Migratory birds don't cry) is a 1986 Indian Malayalam-language drama film written and directed by Padmarajan. It stars Mohanlal, Karthika, Shari, and Urvashi. The film tells the story of two school girls who eloped while on a school trip. Though not commercially successful, it was critically well acclaimed, being one of the first Indian films that talked about womance.

== Plot ==
Two young girls from a boarding school, Nirmala a.k.a. Nimmy and Sally, decide to slip away while on a school picnic. They believe that as troublemakers, they are not wanted at school or home. They see the world's resentment personified in a mean teacher named Devika, who is in charge of this particular picnic. The girls escape and find a convent to stay at for the next night and a youth hostel soon after under the disguise that they are traveling college students. Meanwhile, Devika loses her job.

As the girls piece together a living doing odd jobs, a stranger, Harishankar, befriends them, and Nimmy begins to develop an infatuation for him. Sally is jealous of Hari and his influence on Nimmy; she initially tries to protect her friend but finally accedes, not wanting to hinder her friend's choice. After a while, Nimmy tells Hari the truth about her situation in exchange for him telling her his situation. Hari is a suspended bank manager who lost his job because someone pretending to be the wife of a dead man tricked him into giving her the dead man's money in the bank. However, since his suspension, he has been anonymously receiving a fixed sum every month through post.

As Nimmy shows Hari her photo album, he realizes that this swindler is Devika. It also gives him an explanation as to why the money orders had stopped. They subsequently trace Devika, and Hari falls in love with her. He promises to get her job back because he knows the girls' whereabouts. He will also be done with his suspension by then. Hari then knowingly manipulates Nimmy's love for him, though he says or does nothing more than lead her on. He expects her to be understanding, thinking that she is just infatuated with him and too young. Hari brings up a position where Nimmy agrees to go back, thinking he will then love her. Sally considers that Nimmy's choices are hers, but finally, the girls agree to Hari's proposition to mediate between them and Devika. In this meeting, Sally ends up outraged at Devika for no particular reason and storms out, refusing to go back to school. Nimmy agrees to convince her, but then things go south as Hari reveals that Devika is his fiancée.

Back at their hostel, Sally decides to flee and implores Nimmy to come with her, but she refuses. They then share an intimate goodbye. Sally then comes back halfway, realizing it is not fine. She then bangs open the door to find Nimmy about to commit suicide. They both break down and hug.

The next morning, Hari, Devika, and the school faculty arrive to find that the two girls are in bed together, dead. The last scene shows Hari, who sports a regretful expression.

== Cast ==
- Mohanlal as Harishankar
- Karthika as Nirmala (Nimmy)
- Shari as Sally
- Urvashi as Devika
- Jalaja as another teacher and Devika's close friend
- Jagathy N. K. Achary
- Subramaniam
- Latheef
- Poojappura Radhakrishnan
- Dev
- Noor Jehan
- Mudavanmugal Krishnankutty
- Kunjumol
- Rajam K. Nair
- Omanayamma
- K. R. Savithri
- Shanthi
- Thara

== Soundtrack ==
The film score was composed by S. P. Venkatesh while the songs were composed by Raveendran and the lyrics were written by O. N. V. Kurup.

No.	Song	Singers	Lyrics	Length (m:ss)
1	"Poo Veno Poo"	K. S. Chithra	O. N. V. Kurup	
2	"Vaanampaadi Etho"	K. J. Yesudas	O. N. V. Kurup	
