= Kanamarayathu =

- Promotional poster designed by P. N. Menon
- Directed by: I. V. Sasi
- Written by: P. Padmarajan
- Starring: Mammootty; Shobana; Rahman; Lalu Alex; Seema
- Cinematography: Jayanan Vincent
- Edited by: K. Narayanan
- Music by: Shyam (songs); Guna Singh (background score)
- Release date: 27 July 1984
- Country: India
- Language: Malayalam

Kanamarayathu (transl. Hidden in plain sight) is a 1984 Malayalam film written by Padmarajan and directed by I. V. Sasi. It stars Mammootty, Shobhana, Rahman, Lalu Alex, and Seema. The story is an adaptation of the 1912 novel Daddy-Long-Legs by Jean Webster. This film won Kerala State Film Awards for the Best Story (Padmarajan), Best Music Director (Shyam), and Best Female Singer (S. Janaki).

== Plot ==
Sherly is an orphan who is sponsored by an old man. On his death, the sponsorship is continued by his son Roy, a rich businessman. But Sherly does not know about him. She comes to a college in the city where Roy's niece, Mercy, is her classmate, and she meets Roy still not knowing he is her sponsor. Alex introduces his brother Baby to Roy, and on Roy's advice Baby starts working in his firm.

At Mercy's birthday party, Baby meets Sherly and falls in love with her. But she is already drawn to Roy, still without knowing that he is her sponsor, and she rejects Baby. Later, Sherly thinks that Roy has no feelings for her. Though he is in love with her, he does not wish to reveal it because of the age gap between them. Also, Baby confuses her by lying to her that Roy and Elsie were in love for a long time and couldn't marry because of Roy's father. Sherly is extremely frustrated at this and in a fit of rage, goes to Elsie and lies to her that she is pregnant with Roy's baby. Elsie is shocked at this and goes to Roy's office and scolds him for his irresponsibility but he tells her that it was not him.

He calls Sherly to his office and shouts at her, thinking she is pregnant with Baby's child and lied to the doctor that she is carrying his baby. However, Sherly tells him that she was lying to break them up and also to prove her love for him. She discloses that she cannot live without him.

The Mother Superior of the convent informs Roy that Sherly is going to be sent to Italy to learn music and that she is allowed to become a nun now. On Mother Superior's advice, she decides to become a nun even though she doesn't want to and plans to leave for Italy as gratitude towards Mother and her sponsor.

So, as a final meeting, Sherly sees Roy to let him know that she is leaving and that she cannot see him anymore. She also meets Baby and reveals everything, including the fact that she is an orphan and that she is going to be a nun. He, however, still is willing to marry her. Sherly tells him that she is in love with someone else and her decision to become a nun was because he did not accept her proposal. He insists her on telling him who the person is, to which she responds that it is Roy. Hearing this, he goes to Roy's office and shouts at him for what he did.

As a last wish, Sherly wants to see her unknown sponsor who has blessed her all her life with what she would have never had. Mother Superior meets Roy and discloses Sherly's wish to meet her sponsor before she leaves for Italy. However, he refuses. Mother Superior hands him a letter from Sherly and leaves. Just before her departure, Sherly is told that her sponsor will meet her. She rushes down the orphanage corridor, to find Roy there.

== Cast ==
- Mammootty as Roy Varghese
- Shobana as Sherly
- Lalu Alex as Alex
- Rahman as Baby
- Seema as Dr. Elsie George
- Sabitha Anand as Mercy
- Unni Mary as Anne, Alex's wife
- Sukumari as Roy's mother
- Kaviyoor Ponnamma as Mother Superior
- Bahadoor as Mathappan

== Release ==
The film was released on 27 July 1984.

=== Box office ===
The film was a commercial success.

== Soundtrack ==
S. Janaki won the Kerala State Film Award for Best Singer ( Female ) for the song "Kasthuriman Kurunne". The song "Oru Madhura Kinavin" was remixed and used in the Prithviraj Sukumaran starring Teja Bhai and Family (2011), sung by Vijay Yesudas, whose father had sung the original.

All music is composed by Shyam.

No.	Title	Artist(s)	Length
1.	"Kasthuriman Kurunne"	S. Janaki
2.	"Kasthuriman Kurunne"	Krishnachandran
3.	"Illiyilam Kili Chillimulam Kili"	S. Janaki
4.	"Oru Madhura Kinavin"	K. J. Yesudas

== Remake ==
Kanamarayathu was remade in Hindi as Anokha Rishta in 1986 starring Rajesh Khanna and Smita Patil.
