= Padmarajan =

Indian film maker and author

Padmarajan Padmanabhan Pillai
- Born: Padmarajan Padmanabhan Pillai; 23 May 1945; Muthukulam, Haripad, Travancore
- Died: 23 January 1991 (aged 45); Kozhikode, Kerala, India
- Other name: Pappettan
- Education: Mahatma Gandhi College, Thiruvananthapuram; University College, Thiruvananthapuram
- Occupations: Filmmaker; writer; AIR newsreader
- Years active: 1975–1991
- Works: Full list
- Spouse: Radhalakshmi
- Children: 2

Padmarajan Padmanabhan Pillai (23 May 1945 – 23 January 1991), better known as P. Padmarajan, was an Indian film maker, screenwriter and author who was known for his works in Malayalam literature and Malayalam cinema. Considered one of the greatest Malayalam directors and screenwriters of all time, he founded a new school of film making in Malayalam cinema, along with Bharathan and K. G. George, in the 1980s.

Padmarajan was known for his detailed screenwriting and expressive direction style and made some of the landmark motion pictures in Malayalam cinema. He won the Kerala Sahithya Academy Award in 1972 for his novel Nakshathrangale Kaval. He made his directorial debut in 1979 with Peruvazhiyambalam which won the National Film Award for Best Feature Film in Malayalam. He won his second National Award in 1986 with Thinkalaazhcha Nalla Divasam. Padmarajan had won six Kerala State Film Awards which includes two awards for Best Story in 1978, 1979 and two awards for Best Screenplay in 1984 and 1986. He has written screenplay for thirty seven movies among which eighteen he directed. The screenplay for all the movies he directed were written by Padmarajan himself. Njan Gandharvan was his last movie and within a week of its release, he died at Kozhikode due to sudden cardiac arrest.

== Early life ==
Padmarajan was born on 23 May 1945 in Muthukulam near Haripad in Alappuzha, which was then under the princely state of Travancore. He was the sixth son of Thundathil Anantha Padmanabha Pillai and Njavarakkal Devaki Amma. After early schooling at Muthukulam, he studied at Mahatma Gandhi College, Thiruvananthapuram and University College, Thiruvananthapuram, graduating with a B.Sc. in chemistry (1963). Subsequently, he learned Sanskrit from the scholar Cheppad Achyutha Warrier at Muthukulam. He then joined All India Radio, Trichur (1965), starting as a programme announcer, and later settled at Poojappura, Thiruvananthapuram(1968); he would remain at All India Radio until 1986 when his involvement in films prompted him to retire voluntarily.Padmarajan began his literary career during his stay at Thrissur and the friendships and experiences he gained during the period influenced his works thereafter. After his move to Thiruvananthapuram, his reputation as a writer and participation among the literary circles in the capital flourished.It was during this early days that he appeared in a short cameo in the movie Kallichellamma which released in 1969. This is his only appearance in film as an actor.

== Career as screenwriter and director ==
Padmarajan's stories mainly deal with deceit, murder, romance, mystery, passion, jealousy, libertinism, anarchism, individualism, social structure, human psychology and life of peripheral elements of society. Some of them are considered among the best in Malayalam literature. In his films and stories, Padmarajan created characters that were complex, multidimensional, and deeply human. Padmarajan's works were often inspired by real-life people and situations he witnessed, such as the tragic tale of a woman who committed suicide after being abandoned by her lover, which served as the basis for his film "Thakara." He often drew inspiration from the people and situations he encountered in his daily life, such as the struggles of rural farmers or the complexities of urban relationships. The screenplay for all the movies he directed were written by Padmarajan himself. His first novel published in 1971 titled Nakshathrangale Kaaval (The Stars Alone Guard Me) won the Kerala Sahithya Academy award (1972).

He entered the world of Malayalam cinema by writing the screenplay for Prayanam (1975) which was Bharathan's directorial debut and had the cinematography by Balu Mahendra. Rappadikalude Gatha (1978) was his third movie as a screenwriter which won the Kerala State Film Award for Best Story in 1978. His next work as a screenwriter was the classic erotic film Rathinirvedam (1978) which is regarded as a landmark in Indian film history.

After writing screenplay for three more films, Padmarajan made his directional debut in 1979 with Peruvazhiyambalam (The Halfway House). It won the National Film Award for Best Feature Film in Malayalam and was included in IBN Live's list of 100 greatest Indian films of all time. His next directed Oridathoru Phayalvaan (There Lived a Wrestler) in 1981. Padmarajan also did the editing of this movie. It won the award for best script at the Kuala Lumpur International Film Festival and a gold medal at the Asian Film Festival. In 1982 he directed Novemberinte Nashtam which was critically acclaimed. Padmarajan's Koodevide? (1983) won the Kerala State Film Award for Best Film with Popular Appeal and Aesthetic Value. In 1984, he wrote the screenplay for I. V Sasi's Kanamarayathu, which won the Kerala State Film Award for Best Screenplay. In 1986 he directed Desatanakkili Karayarilla, which is one of the first Indian films that explored womance on screen. He won the second National Award with Thinkalazhcha Nalla Divasam in 1985. Padmarajan's Kariyilakkattu Pole (1986) is considered one of the classic investigative thrillers in Malayalam. The same year he directed Arappatta Kettiya Gramathil which was a failure at box office. The plot of the movie which revolves around a brothel and the sex workers in it eventually developed a cult following.

With Mohanlal and Mammootty in the lead role, Padmarajan directed some of the cult classic movies in Malayalam such as Namukku Parkkan Munthiri Thoppukal (1986), Arappatta Kettiya Gramathil (1986), Kariyilakkattu Pole (1986), Thoovanathumbikal (1987) and Season (1989). Thoovanathumbikal was ranked eighth by IBN Live in its list of greatest Indian films of all time and is considered one of the best romantic movies ever made in Malayalam. Aparan (1988) is his another classic mystery psychological thriller which also marked the acting debut of Jayaram. It won the Kerala State Film Award for Best Screenplay in 1988. Moonnam Pakkam (1988) is another classic Padmarajan movie which was critically acclaimed. His 1990 movie Innale is mainly noted for the performance of Suresh Gopi. Padmarajan's last movie Njan Gandharvan (1991) was a failure at box office. But the film later developed a cult following because of its aesthetics and storytelling. Within a week of its release, Padmarajan died at a hotel in Kozhikode. In total Padmarajan has written screenplay for 37 films among 18 of which he directed.

=== Association with Bharathan ===
Together with Bharathan and K. G. George, he successfully laid the foundation for a school of Malayalam cinema that strove to tread a middle ground by striking a fine balance. The term "Parallel film" is usually used to describe Padmarajan's style of film making. Along with Bharathan, he displayed mastery in handling sexuality on the screen, hitherto less known in Malayalam cinema.

=== Association with actors ===
He was quite adept in spotting talent, and introduced many fresh faces who would later make their mark in Indian cinema, including Jayaram (Aparan), Ashokan (Peruvazhiyambalam), Rasheed (Oridathoru Phayalvaan), Rahman (Koodevide), Ramachandran (Novemberinte Nashtam), Ajayan (Moonnam Pakkam). Also artists like Nitish Bharadwaj (Njan Gandharvan), Suhasini (Koodevide); Shari (Namukku Parkkan Munthirithoppukal) were introduced to Malayalam screen by him.

He coaxed sparkling and inspired performances from many actors, such as Bharath Gopi, Mammootty, Mohanlal, Jayaram, Shobana, Sumalatha, Karamana Janardanan Nair, Rahman, Jagathy Sreekumar, Suresh Gopi, Thilakan, Nedumudi Venu and Ashokan; indeed, Thilakan's rendition in Moonnam Pakkam is considered one of the best performance in his career. His association with Mohanlal and Mammootty was well noted especially because their films broke the conventional concepts prevailing during that time. He also aided in establishing, to a fair degree, the fame of other directors such as Bharathan, I. V. Sasi, and Mohan, through his association with them. His collaboration with Bharathan as a scriptwriter is considered to have produced remarkable works in Malayalam cinema. His assistants who went on to direct films independently include Thoppil Ajayan (Perumthachan), Suresh Unnithan's (Jaathakam, Raadhaamaadhavam), and Blessy's (Kaazhcha, Thanmaathra, the latter adapted from Padmarajan's short story Orma.

== Film making ==
Padmarajan is celebrated for his unparalleled attention to detail in his screenplays. Most of his films portrayed human relationships and emotions. Many of his films have haunting climaxes, most of them not commonly portrayed in Malayalam movies. His characters are portrayed with sensitivity and intensity on the screen. The landscape is also a major part of Padmarajan's craft in film making. His theses were well crafted in his films. Padmarajan's films explore the features of the landscape naturally.

Padmarajan's screenplays had such hitherto-unheard of features and subjects – such as casting rain as a character in Thoovanathumbikal (Dragonflies in the drizzle), homosexual love in Desatanakkili Karayarilla (Migratory Birds Don't Cry), unusual climax (by traditional standards) in Namukku Parkkan Munthiri Thoppukal (Vineyards for us to dwell) and Oridathoru Phayalvaan (There Lived a Wrestler). Forbidden love and characters that strive to rise above the limitations of middle-class Malayali society of the seventies and eighties is a recurring theme in many of his works. Many of his films bear the mark of his romanticism.

== Personal life ==
Padmarajan's wife Radhalakshmi is from Chittur in Palakkad. Radhalakshmi was his colleague at AIR before their marriage in 1970. Radhalakshmi has written her reminiscences about him in her book Padmarajan Entaey Gandharvan (Padmarajan, my celestial lover). Their son, P. Ananthapadmanabhan, is a writer. They also have a daughter, Madhavikkutty.

Padmarajan died suddenly at Hotel Paramount Towers in Kozhikode in the early hours of 23 January 1991. He was staying at the hotel overnight in the middle of a promotional tour visiting the theatres playing his last film Njan Gandharvan. The cause of death was a massive cardiac arrest. His dead body was taken to his ancestral home in Muthukulam, and was cremated there with full state honours.

== Bibliography ==
=== Novels ===
- Itha Ivide Vare
- Jalajwala
- Kallan Pavithran
- Manju Kaalam Notta Kuthira
- Nakshathrangale Kaaval
- Nanmakalude Sooryan
- Peruvazhiyambalam
- Prathimayum Rajakumariyum
- Rathinirvedam
- Rithubhedhangalude Paarithoshikam
- Shavavahanangalum Thedi
- Udakappola (Thoovanathumbikal)
- Vadakakku Oru Hridayam
- Vikramakaaleeswaram

=== Short stories ===
- Aparan (Aparan)
- Avalude Katha
- Kariyilakkattu Pole (Kariyilakkattu Pole)
- Kaivariyude Thekkeyattam
- Kazhinja Vasantha Kalathil
- Lola
- Mattullavarude Venal
- Onnu Randu Moonnu
- Prahelika
- Pukakkannada
- Syphilisinte Nadakkavu
- Athirthi
- Jeevithacharya
- Choondal
- Amritheth
- Swayam
- Mazha
- Mrithy
- Oru Sthree Oru Purushan
- Kunju
- Shoorphanaka
- Kaikeyi
- Nisha Shalabham
- Banyan Avenue
- Orma
- Jeevithacharya
- Oru Sameepakaala Durantham
- Ningalude Thaavalangal Ningalkk
- Raanimaarude Kudumbam
- Ore Chandranmaar

== Filmography ==
Year	Film	Director	Writer	Directed by	Lead Role
1975	Prayanam		Yes	Bharathan	Nandita Bose, Karan, Lakshmi, Kottarakkara Sridharan Nair
1977	Itha Ivide Vare		Yes	I. V. Sasi	Bahadoor, Adoor Bhasi, Jayabharati, Jayan
1978	Nakshathrangale Kaaval		Yes	K.S. Sethumadhavan	Bahadur, Adoor Bhasi, Nandita Bose, Jayabharati
1978	Rappadikalude Gatha		Yes	K.G. George	M.G. Soman, Vidhubala, Jose, Krishnachandran
1978	Rathinirvedam		Yes	Bharathan	Krishnachandran, Jayabharati, Kaviyoor Ponnamma, K.P.A.C. Lalitha
1978	Sathrathil Oru Rathri		Yes	N. Sankaran Nair	Kaviyoor Ponnamma, Prathapachandran, Sukumaran, M.G. Soman
1978	Vadakakku Oru Hridayam		Yes	I. V. Sasi	Bahadoor, Adoor Bhasi, Adoor Bhavani, Janardhanan
1979	Peruvazhiyambalam	Yes			Asokan, Jose Prakash, K. P. A. C. Lalitha, Geetha, Bharath Gopi
1979	Kochu Kochu Thettukal		Yes	Mohan	Kalasala Babu, Paravoor Bharathan, Hema Chaudhari, Innocent
1980	Thakara		Yes	Bharathan	Prathap Pothen, Surekha, Nedumudi Venu, K.G. Menon
1981	Shalini Ente Koottukari		Yes	Mohan	Shobha, Jalaja, Sukumaran, Venu Nagavalli
1981	Oridathoru Phayalvaan	Yes			Nedumudi Venu, Jayamala, Jayanthi, Asokan
1981	Kallan Pavithran	Yes			Nedumudi Venu, Bharat Gopy, Adoor Bhasi, Subhashini, Beena Banerjee
1982	Lorry		Yes	Bharathan	Achankunju, Bahadur, Meena, Balan K. Nair
1982	Novemberinte Nashtam	Yes			Madhavi, Prathap Pothen, Surekha, Bharat Gopy
1983	Idavela		Yes	Mohan	Idavela Babu, Asokan, Nalini, Innocent
1983	Koodevide	Yes			Suhasini Maniratnam, Mammootty, Rahman, Jose Prakash
1983	Kaikeyi		Yes	I. V. Sasi	Poornima Jayaram, Vanitha Krishnachandran, Prathap Pothen, Radhika Sarathkumar
1984	Eenam		Yes	Bharathan	Adoor Bhasi, Bharat Gopy, Kanakalatha, Unni Mary
1984	Parannu Parannu Parannu	Yes			Rahman, Rohini, Nedumudi Venu, Sukumari, Jagathy Sreekumar
1985	Kanamarayathu		Yes	I. V. Sasi	Mammootty, Shobana, Rahman, Seema
1985	Thinkalazhcha Nalla Divasam	Yes			Kaviyoor Ponnamma, Mammootty, Srividya, Karamana Janardanan Nair,
1985	Ozhivukalam		Yes	Bharathan	Prem Nazeer, Srividhya, Rohini, K.T.C. Abdullah, Jalaja, Bhaskara Kurup, Karamana Janardanan Nair
1986	Karimpinpoovinakkare		Yes	I. V. Sasi	Mammootty, Mohanlal, Seema, Urvashi
1986	Anokha Rishta		Yes	I. V. Sasi	Rajesh Khanna, Smita Patil, Sabeeha, Shafi Inamdar
1986	Namukku Parkkan Munthiri Thoppukal	Yes	Yes		Mohanlal, Shari, Thilakan, Vineeth, Kaviyoor Ponnamma
1986	Kariyilakkattu Pole	Yes	Yes		Mammootty, Mohanlal, Rahman, Karthika, Jalaja, Sripriya
1986	Arappatta Kettiya Gramathil	Yes	Yes		Mammootty, Jagathy Sreekumar, Asokan, Nedumudi Venu, Sukumari
1986	Desatanakkili Karayarilla	Yes	Yes		Mohanlal, Urvashi, Karthika, Jalaja, Shari Sukumari
1987	Nombarathi Poovu	Yes	Yes		Madhavi, Murali, Mammootty, Shari, Jagathy Sreekumar
1987	Thoovanathumbikal	Yes	Yes		Mohanlal, Sumalatha, Parvathy Jayaram, Asokan, Jagathy Sreekumar
1988	Aparan	Yes	Yes		Jayaram, Shobana, Mukesh, Madhu, Parvathi, Jalaja, Jagathy Sreekumar,
1988	Moonnam Pakkam	Yes	Yes		Jayaram, Asokan, Thilakan, Rahman, Jagathy Sreekumar
1989	Season	Yes	Yes		Mohanlal, Gavin Packard, Asokan, Jagathy Sreekumar, Shari
1990	Innale	Yes	Yes		Shobana, Jayaram, Srividya, Suresh Gopi, Jagathy Sreekumar
1990	Ee Thanutha Veluppan Kalathu		Yes	Joshiy	Mammootty, Suresh Gopi, Murali, Mukesh, Lakshmi, Jagathy Sreekumar
1991	Njan Gandharvan	Yes	Yes		Nitish Bharadwaj, Suparna Anand, M.G. Soman, Ganesh Kumar

=== Voice-Cameos ===
According to his family sources, Padmarajan, who started his career as a Staff Announcer in All India Radio, rendered his voice in many movies as well. Some of the notable ones are as below:

- 1921 : Voice-over for the Prologue.
- Novemberinte Nashtam : Das, the lead character played by Pratap Pothen.
- Peruvazhiyambalam : The shop owner who converses with the character Prabhakaran Pillai, in the first scene of the movie.
- Oridathoru Phayalvaan : The wrestler who is the protagonist of the movie, played by Rashid.
- Kariyilakkaattu Pole : The Head Priest at the Ashram where the character Bhagini Sevaamayi played by Unni Mary resides.
- Aparan : The Imposter's role played by Jayaram. Also the rogue's role played by VBK Menon who gets into a brawl with the hero Vishwanathan, at the restaurant.
- Innale : The herdsman, played by Nilambur Balan, who finds the body of female lead role played by Shobhana after the accident.
- Njan Gandharvan : The Celestial Voice.
- Koodevide : The small role of a military officer who informs the character portrayed by Suhasini about her brother's sudden demise.
- Season : The voice-over in between the song “Poy Varoo...”

== Awards ==
Kerala Sahithya Academy Awards

- 1972: Novel – Nakshathrangale Kaval

National Film Awards

- 1979: Best Feature Film in Malayalam – Peruvazhiyambalam
- 1986: Best Feature Film in Malayalam – Thinkalaazhcha Nalla Divasam

Filmfare Awards South

- 1988: Filmfare Award for Best Director – Malayalam - Aparan

Kerala State Film Awards

- 1978: Best Story – Rappadikalude Gatha
- 1979: Second Best Film – Peruvazhiyambalam
- 1979: Best Story – Peruvazhiyambalam
- 1983: Best Film with Popular Appeal and Aesthetic Value – Koodevide
- 1984: Best Screenplay – Kanamarayathu
- 1988: Best Screenplay – Aparan

Kerala Film Critics' Awards

- 1977: Best Screenplay – Itha Ivide Vare
- 1982: Best Film – Novemberinte Nashtam
- 1983: Best Screenplay -Koodevide
- 1984: Best Screenplay – Kanamarayathu
- 1986: Best Screenplay – Namukku Parkkan Munthiri Thoppukal, Nombarathi Poovu
- 1988: Best Screenplay – Aparan, Moonnam Pakkam
- 1990: Best Screenplay – Innale

Film Fans' Awards

- 1975: Best Screenplay – Prayaanam
- 1977: Best Screenplay – Itha Ivide Vare
- 1978: Best Screenplay – Rappadikalude Gatha, Rathinirvedam
- 1980: Best Screenplay – Thakara

Other awards

- 1982: Kualalumpur Film Festival – Best Film – Oridathoru Phayalvaan
- 1982: Kualalumpur Film Festival – Best Script – Oridathoru Phayalvaan
- 1982: Gulf Award for Best Film – Novemberinte Nashtam
- 1983: Pournami Award for Best Director – Koodevide
- 1987: Film Chamber Award for Best Story – Thoovanathumbikal
- 1988: Film Fare Award for Best Director – Aparan
- 1990: Film Chamber Award for Best Story – Innale
- 1991: FAC award – Njan Gandharvan

== Padmarajan Award ==
Padmarajan Puraskaram or Padmarajan Award is an annual film/literary award instituted by the Padmarajan Memorial Trust. It carries a plaque and a cash award of ₹ 10,000. The award is given in two categories:

- Padmarajan Award for Best Short Story
- Padmarajan Award for Best Film

== See also ==
- Malayalam cinema
- Bharathan
