= Nakshathrangale Kaaval (film) =

- Directed by: K. S. Sethumadhavan
- Written by: P. Padmarajan
- Screenplay by: P. Padmarajan
- Based on: Nakshathrangale Kaaval by P. Padmarajan
- Produced by: Hari Pothan
- Starring: Jayabharathi; MG Soman; Sukumari; Adoor Bhasi
- Cinematography: Ramachandra Babu
- Edited by: K. Narayanan
- Music by: G. Devarajan
- Production company: Supriya
- Distributed by: Supriya
- Release date: 29 December 1978
- Country: India
- Language: Malayalam

Nakshathrangale Kaaval (lit. 'The stars alone guard me') is a 1978 Indian Malayalam-language film adaptation of the Kerala Sahitya Akademi Award-winning novel of the same name by P. Padmarajan. It is directed by K. S. Sethumadhavan and produced by Hari Pothan and stars Jayabharathi, M. G. Soman, Sukumari and Adoor Bhasi in the lead roles. The film has musical score by G. Devarajan.

== Cast ==
- Jayabharathi
- M. G. Soman
- Sukumari
- Adoor Bhasi
- Kottayam Santha
- Shubha
- Bahadoor
- KPAC Sunny
- Nanditha Bose
- T. P. Madhavan
- Urmila

== Soundtrack ==
The music was composed by G. Devarajan and the lyrics were written by O. N. V. Kurup.

No.	Song	Singers	Lyrics	Length (m:ss)
1	"Ilakozhinja Tharunirakal"	P. Jayachandran, P. Madhuri	O. N. V. Kurup	
2	"Kaashithumbe"	Vani Jairam	O. N. V. Kurup	
3	"Nakshathrangale"	K. J. Yesudas	O. N. V. Kurup	
