= Kallan Pavithran =

1981 film by Padmarajan

- Poster
- Directed by: P. Padmarajan
- Written by: P. Padmarajan
- Based on: Kallan Pavithran by P. Padmarajan
- Produced by: M. Mani
- Starring: Nedumudi Venu; Bharath Gopi; Beena Kumbalangi
- Cinematography: Vipin Das
- Edited by: Madhu Kainakari
- Music by: Shyam
- Production company: Sunitha Productions
- Distributed by: Aroma Movies
- Release date: 26 June 1981
- Country: India
- Language: Malayalam

Kallan Pavithran (transl. Pavithran, the thief) is a 1981 Indian Malayalam-language drama film written and directed by P. Padmarajan, based on his own short story of the same name. It stars Nedumudi Venu and Bharath Gopi, along with Subhashini, Beena and Devi in supporting roles. The film revolves around the lives of Pavithran, a petty thief, and Mamachan, a mill owner. Their lives turn upside down when Pavithran finds wealth from an unknown source.

== Plot ==
Pavithran is a petty thief who began stealing as a child and later graduated to stealing bicycles, utensils and other household articles. Despite his profession, he leads a simple life and is generally regarded as harmless by the people around him. He is married and has two children, while also maintaining a relationship with Damayanthi, his mistress. Pavithran regularly sells his stolen goods to a merchant who deals in second-hand articles and is aware of their origin.

Pavithran hopes to find employment at the flour mill owned by Mamachan, but Mamachan refuses to employ him because of his reputation as a thief. Mamachan is also attracted to Damayanthi. One day, Pavithran steals several articles from Mamachan's house and brings them to the merchant. While waiting for the articles to be valued, Pavithran is asked to enter a room where the merchant keeps a large collection of household objects. He is astonished by the enormous quantity of articles stored there and attempts to steal some of them. The merchant watches him through a hole in the room. When a snake appears, Pavithran tries to escape but finds the door apparently locked. Merchant then reveals that there was no latch on the door, leaving Pavithran embarrassed.

Damayanthi subsequently becomes close to Mamachan, causing Pavithran to distance himself from her. After being away for several days, Pavithran returns with a large amount of money and begins living more extravagantly. He improves his family's living conditions, sends his children to a better school and travels in expensive cars. He later establishes his own rice mill, naming it the Janaki Rice Mill. Mamachan, who attends its inauguration, becomes increasingly frustrated as Pavithran's business begins attracting his customers.

Pavithran eventually becomes close to Bhama, Damayanthi's sister. Bhama initially resists his advances but eventually agrees to a relationship on the condition that he reveal the secret behind his sudden wealth. Pavithran tells her that the room he had entered earlier had no lock. Taking advantage of this, he begins repeatedly stealing articles from merchant's collection and selling them back to him through the merchant.

During one such theft, Pavithran finds a statue covered in dust. He takes it to the merchant, where it is discovered to be made of gold. Merchant is willing to pay a large sum to recover the statue, and Pavithran realizes that he has made a fortune from his thefts. Bhama learns the truth and reveals it to Damayanthi, who in turn informs Mamachan.

Mamachan devises a plan to trap Pavithran. He persuades Bhama to tell Pavithran that the stolen articles must be returned because she does not want to be known as the wife of a thief. Pavithran, eager to win Bhama's affection, agrees to return the goods. When he goes to do so, however, he is caught by the police and imprisoned. Mamachan and Damayanthi are pleased by his downfall, while Bhama regrets what happened after realizing that she has fallen in love with Pavithran.

== Cast ==
- Nedumudi Venu as Pavithran
- Bharath Gopi as Mamachan
- Beena Kumbalangi as Damayanthi
- Subhashini as Bhama, Damayanthi's sister
- Devi as Pavithran's first wife
- Prem Prakash as Kuruppu / Taxi driver
- Bhaskara Kurup as Sub-inspector
- Adoor Bhasi as Merchant
