= Peruvazhiyambalam (novel) =

1979 novel by P. Padmarajan

- Author: P. Padmarajan
- Cover artist: Vinod
- Language: Malayalam
- Genre: Literature Novel
- Publisher: D. C. Books
- Publication date: 1979 September
- Publication place: India
- Pages: 67
- ISBN: 81-7130-858-9

Peruvazhiyambalam is a Malayalam novel written by Padmarajan. In 1978, it was adapted for a feature film also called Peruvazhiyambalam directed by Padmarajan. The novel is about teenager Raman who kills Prabhakaran Pillai, a local thug, in self-defense. It describes his escape from the village by the help of Prabhakaran Pillai's enemies and how he comes to terms with life at the shelter provided by them. The novel explores the teenage mind and its guilt towards crime and its aftermath.
