= Idavela =

- Theatrical release poster
- Directed by: Mohan
- Written by: Padmarajan
- Produced by: Shreyes Films
- Starring: Ashokan; Idavela Babu; Nalini
- Cinematography: U. Rajagopal
- Edited by: G. Venkitaraman
- Music by: M. B. Sreenivasan
- Production company: Shreyes Films
- Distributed by: Century Films
- Release date: 7 May 1982
- Running time: 144 minutes
- Country: India
- Language: Malayalam

Idavela (English: Interval) is a 1982 Malayalam teen film written by Padmarajan and directed by Mohan. It stars Ashokan, Idavela Babu and Nalini in the lead roles. It was the debut film of Idavela Babu, who got his screenname through this film.

== Plot ==
The movie opens with four college boys smoking, drinking and watching pornographic films. They get caught and are punished. Their parents are also informed about the same and they are a disgrace to their families as well. The college NCC decides to conduct a camp for 10 days and these 4 are asked to first cut their hair and then report their name to attend the camp. However they choose not to give their names. They inform at home of going to the camp and plan to spend those 10 days going elsewhere on their own.

On the day of departure, Thomas picks up Ravi from his home. Ravi's brother asks Thomas to take care of Ravi. The 4 meet at the railway station and go to Munnar. They ask the local taxi to take them to a good hotel and the driver takes them to hotel blue meadow. They get a room by providing fake names. The bearer there is Madhavan (Innocent). The boys have come there with the intention of having sex and inquire with Madhavan regarding the same, who says the hotel is a reputable one and such activities don't happen there.

They go for a long walk, find a girl near the lake and follow her to learn that not only does she stay in the same hotel but her room is next to theirs. They try to get friendly with her. She (Nalini) mentions her name to be Malu or they can call her Molu as her mother calls her. She develops a liking towards Ravi and dislikes Thomas. This creates jealousy among the other boys towards Ravi. Ravi falls in love with Molu which he tells her but she doesn't respond. Thomas warns Ravi that they are not here to stay forever and has to tell her their intention in his next meeting with her. The next day Ravi meets with Molu, asks her to pose for a few photos which she does willingly. They walk a long distance away from the hotel with the other 3 boys following them without their knowledge. Then Ravi informs Molu that he has been sent to her to tell her to cooperate with the boys. She smilingly tells him to lie to his friends that they had sex and she wouldn't mind it. Overhearing this, Thomas jumps in front of her and tries to rape her. Ravi runs to the hotel to get help with Alosius trying to stop him. Ravi runs into a muddy swamp and gets engulfed by it. Alosius tries to save him and gets stuck in the mud. Hearing his shout, the other 2 boys along with Molu rush there and pull him out. Molu realizes that Ravi has drowned and Alosius confirms the same. They try in vain to find Ravi in the swamp. Thomas threatens to kill Molu if she tells anyone about this incident. Molu informs them that she also feels responsible for what's happened and wouldn't inform anyone. She returns to the hotel. The boys wait for the evening, when Christmas celebrations start, to return to the hotel so that no one would notice that Ravi is missing. At night, Madhavan brings them their drink which they had ordered the previous day. After Madhavan leaves Thomas asks the boys to have their drinks but they refuse. They accuse him of being hard hearted and of being responsible for the death of Ravi. Thomas throws the bottle through the window and walks out to the balcony to find Molu standing next door. She accuses him of being a cheat and murderer. The next morning, Alosius and Swami are packing their bags when Molu walks into their room. She enquires about Thomas to find that he is nowhere to be found. Madhavan informs them that he saw Thomas walking a far distance away. Aloysius, Swami and Molu run towards the direction pointed by Madhavan calling out Thomas' name. They come near the muddy swamp and find his cigarette packet and match box nearby. They prod the mud with a log of wood to find a hand come up which confirms their doubts that Thomas has drowned in the swamp.

== Cast ==
- Ashokan as Thomas John
- Idavela Babu as Ravi
- Nalini as Molu / Malu
- Dileep as Alosius
- Kumar as Parashuram "Swami"
- Innocent as Madhavettan
- Sankaradi as Nambeesan Sir
- Prem Prakash as Ravi's brother
- Thodupuzha Vasanthi as Thomas's mother

== Soundtrack ==
The music was composed by M. B. Sreenivasan and the lyrics were written by Kavalam Narayana Panicker.

No.	Song	Singers	Lyrics	Length (m:ss)
1	"Amme Kanyaamariyame" (Chilluvazhi Paayum)	Chorus, J. M. Raju	Kavalam Narayana Panicker	
2	"Gloria Gloria Gloria Swargeeya" (Vinnin Saanthi Sandesham)	Chorus, J. M. Raju	Kavalam Narayana Panicker	
3	"Manjumma Vekkum"	Krishnachandran	Kavalam Narayana Panicker	
