= Thinkalaazhcha Nalla Divasam =

- Directed by: P. Padmarajan
- Written by: P. Padmarajan
- Produced by: M. Mani
- Starring: Karamana Janardanan Nair; Mammootty; Kaviyoor Ponnamma; Srividya
- Cinematography: Vasant Kumar
- Edited by: B. Lenin; V. T. Vijayan (assistant)
- Music by: Shyam
- Production company: Sunitha Productions
- Distributed by: New Aroma Release
- Release date: 1 December 1985
- Running time: 126 minutes
- Country: India
- Language: Malayalam

Thinkalaazhcha Nalla Divasam (transl. Monday, an Auspicious Day) is a 1985 Malayalam-language drama film, written and directed by P. Padmarajan. The film stars Karamana Janardanan Nair,Mammootty, Kaviyoor Ponnamma, and Srividya. It tells the story of a son who wants to sell his ancestral house and put his mother in an old age home.

Thinkalaazhcha Nalla Divasam won the National Film Award for Best Feature Film in Malayalam for exploring the layers of family relationship in a rural setting threatened by urban culture and explains how the imminent breakdown of the joint family is prevented by death. However, the film has also been criticized for the portrayal of the lower caste character Kunjan in a negative light for aspiring to purchase the upper caste house.

== Plot ==
Janakiyamma stays in a spacious ancestral house with the help of a distant relative girl and servants who help her take care of her cows and poultry. Her elder son is Narayanankutty, married to Ambika, both central government servants in Bombay (Mumbai). They have two girls, Sheenu and Meenu. Her younger son Gopan is married to Bindu and works in the Middle East. She also had a deceased daughter (not shown in the movie) and her son is Venu.

The story starts with the children and grandchildren arriving at their ancestral house to celebrate the mother's 60th birthday. Janakiyamma is very happy with everybody's enthusiasm and thinks everyone is genuinely enjoying their stay at the house. Meanwhile, Gopan and Bindu have paid an advance for a flat in Bangalore and want their share of the ancestral property (the house in which Janakiyamma lives) to be sold to pay the rest of the amount. Narayanankutty and Ambika learn about this and are upset at uprooting the mother. Narayanankutty is helpless and disappointed because they have not yet bought a house for themselves in Bombay and is visibly envious of the prosperity of his brother. One night, they have a visitor, Kochu/Kunju, who was their father's old servant and belonged to a so-called lower caste. He is now well off and has four sons in the Middle East. He offers to buy the property, which upsets Narayanankutty because he, like his mother, has a superiority complex over the castes below them. Bindu has bought a TV for Amma (mother) and tries to project to her that Amma is not safe alone in that house. Janakiyamma overhears Bindu and Ambika discussing selling the house and waiting for Amma to die. She is heartbroken and accepts the house to be sold. She also agrees to go to an old age home suggested by Bindu and Gopan. She refuses to go with Narayanankutty and Ambika.

She goes to the old age home and passes away the next day. Gopan, now with only his family in the house waiting to be sold, has nightmares. He feels really guilty about his deeds and loses his peace of mind. He decides not to sell the house his mother loved so much and spend the rest of his life there.

The film depicts how materialistic people become given the circumstances and how their past does not have any value in such people's lives. There is also a side track of on and off love angle between Sheenu and Venu and Gopan's girls enjoying the stint in the ancestral house, running around with livestock, bathing in ponds, etc. The girls finally force their father to stay back making his decision to stay in his ancestral house easier. Sheenu, brought up in Mumbai, initially does not like the relative girl at the house because of her over-friendly approach. She later learns in an embarrassing moment from Venu that she understands all the bad words Sheenu used in English because the girl is more educated than her. Padmarajan, with his skillful narrative, clearly shows how urban people generally consider villagers primitive.

== Cast ==
- Kaviyoor Ponnamma as Janakiyamma
- Karamana Janardanan Nair as Narayanankutty
- Mammootty as Gopan
- Srividya as Ambika
- Unnimary as Bindu
- Ashokan as Venu
- Achankunju as Kunju
- Cuckoo Parameswaran as Sheenu
- Ramachandran

== Music ==
Thinkalazhcha Nalla Divasam

Soundtrack album by Shyam
- Released: 1985
- Recorded: 1985
- Genre: Feature film soundtrack
- Length: 4:12
- Language: Malayalam

The film's soundtrack album and the score were composed by music director Shyam. The lyrics are penned by Chunakkara Ramankutty.

List of songs
No.	Title	Lyrics	Singer(s)	Length
1.	"Panineerumayi Ilamkattu Veeshi"	Chunakkara Ramankutty	Vani Jairam	4:12
Total length:				4:12
