= Rappadikalude Gatha =

- Theatrical release poster
- Directed by: K. G. George
- Written by: Padmarajan
- Produced by: Pleasant Pictures
- Starring: Vidhubala; Soman
- Cinematography: B. Kannan
- Edited by: M. N. Appu
- Music by: Devarajan
- Production company: Pleasant Pictures
- Distributed by: Angel Films
- Release date: 10 November 1978
- Country: India
- Language: Malayalam

Rappadikalude Gatha (English: The Journey of the Nightingales) is a 1978 Indian Malayalam-language drama film directed by K. G. George and written by Padmarajan. The film stars M. G. Soman and Vidhubala, along with Sukumari, Jose, Krishnachandran, Prem Prakash and Aranmula Ponnamma in supporting roles. The film was released to widespread critical acclaim praising the writing, direction and the performance of the lead cast. However, despite the positive response the film bombed at the box office. The film won the Kerala State Film Award for Best Film with Popular and Aesthetic Value at the 1978 Kerala State Film Awards.

== Plot ==
The film is woven around Gatha, a young girl who finds happiness in drugs and music. She marries a doctor of humble indisposition. Their marriage runs into difficulty but, after several traumatic experiences, the couple are reconciled.

== Cast ==
- M. G. Soman
- Vidhubala
- Sukumari
- Jose
- Krishnachandran
- Aranmula Ponnamma
- Santhakumari
- Sharmila
- Prem Prakash

== Production ==
It was Padmarajan who advised the producers to ask K. G. George to do this film. The shoot took about two weeks and the film was completed in around 90 days. The whole film was shot in and around Ernakulam and Fort Kochi. The screenplay written by Padmarajan was believed to be lost, until it was unearthed in 2006. Twelve 35mm prints were made and all the prints have been lost.

== Soundtrack ==
The music was composed by G. Devarajan and the lyrics were written by Yusufali Kechery.

| No. | Song | Singers | Lyrics | Length (m:ss) |
|---|---|---|---|---|
| 1 | "Layam Layam" | K. J. Yesudas | Yusufali Kechery | |
| 2 | "Snehaardra" | P. Madhuri | Yusufali Kechery | |

== Reception ==
The film opened to universal acclaim with numerous praises to George, Padmarajan and Vidhubala. The film won the Kerala State Film Award for Best Film with Popular and Aesthetic Value. Despite all the acclaim, the film failed at the box office.
