= Nakshathrangale Kaaval =

Malayalam novel by Padmarajan

Nakshathrangale Kaaval (നക്ഷത്രങ്ങളേ കാവൽ)
- Author: P. Padmarajan
- Language: Malayalam
- Publisher: D. C. Books
- Publication date: May 1971
- Publication place: India
- Media type: Print (Paperback)
- Pages: 247

Nakshathrangale Kaaval (English: The Stars Alone Guard Me) is a Malayalam language novel written by P. Padmarajan and published in 1971. The story revolves around the life of a girl as she matures into a woman. It won the Kerala Sahitya Akademi Award for Novel. A film adaptation of the novel was released in 1978 with Jayabharathi and Soman playing the lead characters. It was directed by K. S. Sethumadhavan and scripted by Padmarajan.
