= Thoovanathumbikal =

- Poster designed by Santhosh
- Directed by: P. Padmarajan
- Written by: P. Padmarajan
- Based on: Udakappola by P. Padmarajan
- Produced by: P. Stanley
- Starring: Mohanlal; Sumalatha; Parvathy; Sreenath; Ashokan; Babu Namboothiri
- Cinematography: Ajayan Vincent; Jayanan Vincent
- Edited by: B. Lenin; V. T. Vijayan (Assistant)
- Music by: Songs: Perumbavoor G. Raveendranath; Score: Johnson
- Production company: Sitara Pictures
- Distributed by: Gandhimathi Films
- Release date: 31 July 1987
- Running time: 151 minutes
- Country: India
- Language: Malayalam

Thoovanathumbikal - (Rain-Spray Swarm/The Rain-Drop Swarm ) (transl. Dragonflies in the Spraying Rain) or, Dragonflies in the Gentle Rain, is a 1987 Indian Malayalam-language romantic drama film written and directed by P. Padmarajan, based partly on his own novel Udakappola. It revolves around Jayakrishnan (Mohanlal) who falls in love with two women; Radha (Parvathy), a distant relative of his, and Clara (Sumalatha), an escort in town.

An experimental film, it was a commercial failure at the box office, but over the years it has turned into a cult film with a large fan following. It was ranked eighth by IBN Live in the list of greatest Indian films of all time. The film is widely noted for its rich film score and songs, dialogues and characters, detailed screenplay, and Mohanlal and Sumalatha's performance. Rain is a recurring theme and is portrayed almost as a character in the film.

The Title: It is impossible to translate the title "Thoovanathumbikal" without loosing its evocativeness, for the simple reason that the English never had monsoon rains and houses built like those in Kerala. During rains the wind whips up the downpour into spray of droplets (thoovaanam-thoovunna vaanam: downpour) . The accompanying gentle breeze sends the spray in through windows. In the ambient light these water droplets create the illusion of a swarm of thumbikal (dragonflies) . The "dragon" in the "dragonfly" shifts the whole mood away from gentle soothing nostalgic heavenly feel Jayakrishnan experiences when he contemplates Clara the very first time and every time , beautifully depicted in the scene where he writes the first letter that changes the destiny of Clara. A substantial part of the emotion is created by the BGM by Johnson. Thus the closest English translation (transliteration) would be "The Rain-Spray Swarm" or "The Rain Drop Swarm"

== Plot ==
Jayakrishnan is a well-to-do bachelor who lives a contrasting dual life: one among his friends in the town, and the other with his mother and sister at their village. While he is an audacious guy celebrating life with his friends in town, he is a frugal family man at home. The film is about his dual life, how he falls in love with two women, Clara and Radha, and his difficulty in deciding between them.

Jayakrishnan is a typical Malayali guy belonging to an aristocratic family from Thrissur. He has his vision of life, especially when it comes to marriage. He is hardworking and works on his farm. At the same time, he enjoys a modern lifestyle with his friends in town, unknown to most people in his village.

While working on his farm one day, Jayakrishnan becomes reacquainted with Radha, a distant relative he hasn't seen since childhood. Radha's no-nonsense attitude immediately attracts him, and he soon falls for her. Jayakrishnan decides to confess his feelings to her. He heads to Radha's college campus. In the midst of a group of about 20 students, he requests a moment of privacy and then expresses his desire to marry her. Radha, unfortunately, refuses his proposal and proceeds to humiliate him by citing his promiscuous reputation.

One day, Jayakrishnan is persuaded to write a letter on behalf of his friend, Thangal, a pimp, to a girl named Clara. Written anonymously in the name of a "mother superior" as an invitation to a Christian Monastery, the letter is intended to fool Clara's father and thereby introduce Clara to the sex industry under Thangal's supervision. As Jayakrishnan writes the letter, it begins to rain. It turns out that Clara is a poor girl who belongs to the coastal fishing community. She has been mistreated by her stepmother and is trying to escape from her home. She agrees to become a sex worker and meets Jayakrishnan under Thangal's supervision. Their meeting is graced by the rain.

Jayakrishnan, saddened by Radha's rejection and urged on by his friend Thangal, agrees to be Clara's first client. This is Jayakrishnan's first time being physical with a woman. Later, he realizes that Clara is a virgin, a fact that disturbs him. He had made a promise to himself that he would not sleep with a virgin unless she was his wife, and if he couldn't keep his pledge, then that girl would at least become his wife. On breaking the one promise he was determined to keep in life, he is deeply disturbed and proposes marriage to Clara. She admires his sincerity and scruples but does not want to cause Jayakrishnan any hurt socially or personally (as she considers herself a sex worker), hence decides to disappear from his life.

During this time, Radha hears more about Jayakrishnan from her brother who was a junior in college to Jayakrishnan. She hears more about the dual life of Jayakrishnan, his small games of fooling people around him, and his ready-to-do-anything-for-friends attitude. She also learns that he had never fooled around with girls, despite his free-spirited lifestyle. Her brother tells her it would be the first time that Jayakrishnan had proposed to a woman. Radha sees Jayakrishnan as the sincere person that he is. She begins to love him and agrees to his marriage proposal. She meets Jayakrishnan to express her feelings towards him and apologizes for her brusque behavior in the past. However, Jayakrishnan has now begun to feel differently. He tells Radha that he does not regard himself as being the right person for her. When questioned by Radha about the reason behind his change of heart, he discloses everything that transpired between him and Clara. Radha is not offended by his behavior at all. She admires his sincerity and depth of feeling. She tells Jayakrishnan that she is not bothered by his past with Clara.

One day, Jayakrishnan receives a telegram from Clara. She informs him that she is coming to visit him again. Jayakrishnan cannot resist meeting her. It rains again around the time they meet. He tells her about Radha. Clara expresses her joy at his new relationship, but also wonders if she is the reason Jayakrishnan is unable to commit to Radha. She decides to leave his life forever. Before leaving, she implores Jayakrishnan to not disappoint Radha.

Jayakrishnan and Radha decide to get married. One day, Jayakrishnan receives a late-night phone call that Clara is coming to see him, and this will be their last meeting, taking place at Ottapalam railway station. It rains heavily that day. Shocked, Jayakrishnan and Radha can't decide what to do. Radha asks Jayakrishnan not to meet Clara, but he cannot resist seeing her. He goes to meet Clara.

Toward the end of the movie, Jayakrishnan reaches the station to meet Clara. Radha also reaches the station but without Jayakrishan's knowledge. At the station, both are surprised to see that Clara is married and the mother of a child. She tells Jayakrishnan that she has decided to marry to save both their futures. Now, she can have a family life and Jayakrishnan can marry Radha, with whom he has fallen in love. Clara leaves Jayakrishnan's life forever, and Radha and Jayakrishnan unite. It does not rain at the final meeting between Clara and Jayakrishnan.

== Cast ==
- Mohanlal as Mannarathodi Jayakrishna Menon/ Jayakrishnan
- Sumalatha as Clara
- Parvathy Jayaram as Radha
- Ashokan as Rishi (Jayakrishnan's friend)
- Babu Namboothiri as Thangal
- Sreenath as Madhavan, Radha's brother
- Sukumari as Lakshmi, Jayakrishnan's mother
- Jagathi Sreekumar as Ravunni/Ramanunni Nair
- Sankaradi as Sukumaran, Radha's father
- M. G. Soman as Mathew Joseph (cameo as Clara's husband)
- Sulakshana as Malini, Jayakrishnan's sister
- Jayalalita as Ranjini, Radha's cousin.
- Santhakumari
- Alex Mathew as Babu (owner of Devamatha Bus)

== Production ==
Development

The film is partly based on Padmarajan's novel Udakappola. Director Bharathan did the illustration for this novel when it was serialised in Malayalanadu weekly. Part of the film, especially Jayakrishnan's lifestyle in the town, is loosely based on one of Padmarajan's friends, Karakath Unni Menon. Padmarajan met Unni Menon when the former was working at All India Radio, Thrissur. The friends of Jayakrishan were loosely based on the other friends of Unni Menon: Kanjavu Varkey, Express George, and Vijayan Karot.

Filming

The popular bar scene in the film was shot in Sharabi Bar of Casino Hotel, situated near the Shaktan Thampuran Private Bus Stand in Thrissur. Thoovanathumbikal was the first film to be shot there, the hotel and the bar have since appeared in many films. It was extensively shot in and around Thrissur, some scenes were also shot in Ottappalam, Palakkad. The film was shot in places such as Sree Kerala Varma College and Vadakkunnathan Temple.

== Soundtrack ==
The songs featured in the film were composed by Perumbavoor G. Raveendranath with lyrics by Sreekumaran Thampi. Initially, O. N. V. Kurup was the lyricist, who wrote the lyrics first as a poem, and Raveendranath composed the tune based on it. For the scenes of "Megham Poothu Thudangi", the lyrics he wrote began in the line "Ini Nin Manassinte Koodu Thurannathil Oru Minnaminniye Konduvakkam". However, Padmarajan felt that the song did not align with the scenes in the film, hence, it was decided that the tune should be set first and lyrics should be written based on it. Raveendranath composed ten tunes for both the songs. But Kurup was not willing to alter his poem for the tune. Hence, Thampi was called to write the lyrics. He wrote "Megham Poothu Thudangi" in a single night by watching the scenes of the song. The songs were recorded at AVM Studios in Chennai. "Megham Poothu Thudangi" was recorded ten days after "Onnam Raagam Paadi". The background score for the movie was composed by Johnson. The evergreen "Clara - Jayakrishnan" background score is still one of the most loved and followed scores of all time.

No.	Title	Singer(s)	Length
1.	"Megham Poothu Thudangi"	K. J. Yesudas	5:16
2.	"Onnam Raagam Paadi"	G. Venugopal, K. S. Chithra	4:25

== Accolades ==
Kerala Film Critics Association Awards

- Best Screenplay – P. Padmarajan
- Best Actress – Sumalatha
- Best Male Playback Singer – G. Venugopal

== Legacy ==
Although a commercial failure at the time of release, Thoovanathumbikal is considered to be one of the greatest and unforgettable Malayalam films of all time and enjoys a cult status even decades after its release. In a 2013 online poll, IBN Live listed it as the 8th greatest Indian film of all time. The poll was conducted as part of the celebrations of Indian cinema completing 100 years. It constituted a list of 100 films from different Indian languages.

The film's famous thematic "Clara-Jayakrishnan" background score was reused in the 2011 film Beautiful. In the 2012 film Trivandrum Lodge, Babu Namboothiri reprised his role as Thangal, a professional pimp.

Set in Thrissur, the film displays the typical Malayali bachelor lifestyle in many scenes. One such scene where Mohanlal invites Ashokan for a lemonade drink and straight away gets into the city bar, has now become an iconic call sign for a drink offer between Malayalis.

Thoovanathumbikal is considered, by many, to be the most romantic movie ever made in Malayalam cinema history. The film deals with intense human emotions of love and lust. Years after its release, the movie has turned into a cult classic, especially among the youth.
