= Innale =

- Promotional Poster
- Directed by: Padmarajan
- Written by: Padmarajan
- Story by: Vasanthi
- Produced by: Ashraf; Rasheed
- Starring: Suresh Gopi; Jayaram; Shobhana; Srividya
- Cinematography: Venu
- Edited by: B. Lenin; V. T. Vijayan (assistant)
- Music by: Songs: Perumbavoor G. Raveendranath; Background Score: Mohan Sithara
- Distributed by: Chandrakanth Films
- Release date: 4 May 1990
- Running time: 137 minutes
- Country: India
- Language: Malayalam

Innale (transl. Yesterday) is a 1990 Malayalam-language psychological drama film written and directed by P. Padmarajan. The film was produced by Ashraf and Rasheed under the banner A. B. R. Productions. The film stars Suresh Gopi, Jayaram, Shobhana and Srividya in lead roles. The film features original songs composed by Perumbavoor G. Raveendranath, while the film score was composed by Mohan Sithara. The cinematography was handled by Venu, editing by B. Lenin, costumes by Indrans and ADR by T. Krishnanunni.

In the film, a girl (Shobana) is found as an injured victim of a bus accident. She has suffered complete memory loss and is unable to remember her past life or even her name. She falls in love with Sharath Menon (Jayram), who helps her cope with her new life. However, things get troublesome when people from her previous life come searching for her.

Innale was released in theatres on 4 May 1990 to highly positive reviews. The film was a commercial success and went on to become one of the highest grossing Malayalam films of the year. The film won The Kerala State Film Award for Best Music Director (Perumbavoor G. Raveendranath), The Filmfare award for the Best Actress (Shobana) and The Film Critics Award for Best Script (P. Padmarajan). Noted director Ranjith recognizes the film as one of his favorite films.

== Plot ==
A girl, is found as an injured victim of a bus accident, during her travel to religious places throughout India. She is taken to a hospital in a hill station, where the doctor declares that she has amnesia due to the accident, and has forgotten herself and her past.

She forgets her larger past and starts to move with courage, towards her new-found self, after struggling within herself, asking questions. She also meets malicious people who claim to be her well-wishers, taking advantage of her vulnerability. She fights them with the help of the brave Mr. Sharath Menon, who protects her during the transition to become the new Maya (a new name christened by Sharath).

Dr. Sandhya who treated her, is also Sharath's mother. She too comforts her and allows her to become Maya. Though she does worry about what is to follow. Sandhya decides to meet anyone who claim to be Maya's family, so that she could help her out. Sharath brings actors to make Dr. Sandhya believe that Maya has parents, to get his mother's consent to marry Maya, with whom he has deeply fallen in love with. Sandhya has no other choice than to leave the young lovers to their own fate.

A still from the film featuring Jayaram and Srividya

Meanwhile, Dr. Narendran, who is a scientist by profession working in the US, starts to search for his lost wife, Gauri. After much searching with all his friends and resources, he finally gets information about a girl who was an accident victim on a hill station. He calls Sandhya during her birthday party, where the doctor also announces the engagement of Maya with her son, Sharath. Sandhya is shocked and informs her son about Dr. Narendran's phone call. Narendran reminiscences memories of the beautiful days spent with his lovely wife Gauri.

The three main characters meet where Narendran becomes speechless after his wife talks to him like a complete stranger. He decides that she has indeed become a new person and it would be unfair to bring her more sorrow by revealing the truth that she is his wife.

Sharath happily asks whether she was the person he is looking for, to which Narendran answers no, by only shaking his head. He understands that Sharath and Maya are deeply in love with each other and leaves in haste, never showing Sarath his wedding photos with Gauri, that he was carrying with him. The last scene shows the bewildered Maya and Sharath staring at him, leaving so abruptly, without drinking the tea she made.

== Cast ==
- Suresh Gopi as Dr. Narendran
- Shobhana as Maya / Gauri
- Srividya as Dr. Sandhya
- Jayaram as Sarath Menon
- Jagathy Sreekumar as Azhagappan
- T. P. Madhavan as Swamy
- Captain Raju as Circle Inspector Satheeshan
- Philomina as Rahelamma
- Innocent as Shankarapillai
- K. P. A. C. Lalitha as Soshamma
- Sreenath as Dr.Gafoor
- Thikkurissy Sukumaran Nair
- K. P. A. C. Sunny
- Indrans as Sudheer, Hospital Attender

== Soundtrack ==
The songs featured in the film were composed by Perumbavoor G. Raveendranath. The film score was composed by Mohan Sithara. The songs were released by Tharangini.

No.	Song	Singers	Lyrics
1	"Kannil Nin Meyyil"	K. S. Chithra	Kaithapram Damodaran Namboothiri
2	"Nee Vin Poo Pol"	K. J. Yesudas, K. S. Chithra	Kaithapram Damodaran Namboothiri
3	"Kannil Nin Meyyil"	K. J. Yesudas	Kaithapram Damodaran Namboothiri

== Reception ==
=== Critical reception ===
In a retrospect review Praveen Palakkazh of FilmCompanion states that "The character of the husband, Narendran, is played by a pre-superstar Suresh Gopi, and here he shows the genius restraint he has in his performances that do not play to his loud superstar aura. It is in fact this character who haunts me the most in this film." He further states that "Innale is not even one of my favourite Padmarajan works, and yet the feeling and thoughtfulness that even a part of it evokes is a reflection of the work of a master. What would someone like Padmarajan have made of the current generation of brave and beautiful filmmaking that is happening in the Malayalam industry? Would he have gone on to make even better masterpieces than the ones we already savour? Would he have provided succour with his movies during the barren period of creativity in the late nineties and early noughties? Of course, we will never know. Meanwhile, let's keep enjoying the classics he did leave us with."

=== Box office ===
The film was a commercial success and was one of the biggest hits in Padmaranjan's career. It was one of the highest grossers of the year.

== Accolades ==
The film has won numerous accolades, namely:

Award	Category	Nominee(s)	Result
Kerala State Film Awards	Kerala State Film Award for Best Music Director	Perumbavoor G. Raveendranath	Won
Filmfare awards	Filmfare award for Best Actress	Shobana	Won
Film Critic Award	Film Critic Award for Best Script	P. Padmarajan	Won
Film Chamber Award	Film Chamber Award for Best Script	P. Padmarajan	Won
