= Oridathoru Phayalvaan =

- Directed by: P. Padmarajan
- Written by: P. Padmarajan
- Produced by: R. Suresh
- Starring: Rashid; Nedumudi Venu; Jayanthi
- Cinematography: Vipindas
- Edited by: P. Padmarajan
- Music by: Johnson
- Production company: Thundathil Films
- Release date: 30 October 1981
- Running time: 128 minutes
- Country: India
- Language: Malayalam

Oridathoru Phayalvaan (transl. There lived a wrestler) is a 1981 Indian Malayalam-language drama film written, edited and directed by P. Padmarajan. The film is a folk parable about the success and failure in the life of a gatta gusthi wrestler in Kerala. It stars Rashid, Nedumudi Venu and Jayanthi.

The film won the first International award for a Malayalam movie, by winning two prestigious awards - (i) for the 'Best Film' and (ii) for the 'Best Screenplay' at the "27th Asian Film Festival - 1982" held at Kuala Lumpur, Malaysia, also won The Kerala Film Critics Association Award for Best Screenplay, 1981.The film was included in the Indian Panorama section of the Filmotsav'82 held in Calcutta, 1982. It represented India in the competitive section at the Nantes Three Continents Festival-1983 in France (22nd to 29th November 1983). It has also been telecasted in the National Network programme of Malaysian Televisions.

== Plot ==
Patronized by a village tailor, a gatta gusthi wrestler becomes a local hero when he defeats all his opponents and claims the prettiest woman as his wife. As a story within a story it also portrays how the tailor makes a profit from the illiterate wrestler. He marries a girl, only for it to be revealed later that he has another wife and is not interested in her more than a trophy. He abandons his wife and the village when his wife falls for other men in his absence and she acknowledges that she does not love him any more. He leaves her his signature drawing of a conch shell. A frog gigging neighbour youth is entrapped by the girl's mother to marry her conceived daughter. It is way more than that, it is about an illiterate man thinking of his craft as being more than money.

== Cast ==
- Rashid as A Gatta gusthi phayalvaan (wrestler). Voice dubbed by Padmarajan himself.
- Nedumudi Venu as Shivanpillai (Mesthiri)
- Jayanthi as Chakkara, the woman courted by the wrestler
- K. G. Devakiyamma as Chakkara's mother
- Ashokan as Kannan
- M Jayagopal as Job
- Kariyachan
- Krishnankutty Nair as Veloonju (Kannan's father)
- Dhanya
- Mavelikkara Ramachandran
- Said
- Rishikesha Das
- Raju Paakkathu
