= Aparan (film) =

- Theatrical release poster
- Directed by: P. Padmarajan
- Screenplay by: P. Padmarajan
- Story by: P. Padmarajan; M. K. Chandrasekharan
- Produced by: Ajitha
- Starring: Jayaram; Shobana; Mukesh; Madhu; Parvathi; Sukumari
- Cinematography: Venu
- Edited by: B. Lenin
- Music by: Johnson
- Production company: Supriya International
- Distributed by: Thomson Films
- Release date: 12 February 1988
- Running time: 125 minutes
- Country: India
- Language: Malayalam

Aparan (transl. Imposter) is a 1988 Indian Malayalam-language mystery psychological thriller film written and directed by P. Padmarajan, based on his short story of the same name. It stars Jayaram in a dual role, Mukesh, Shobana, Parvathy Jayaram and Madhu. The film explores mistaken identity and the problems that a young, innocent man has to endure in life. The film was the debut of Jayaram and was a critical as well as commercial success. It was remade in Tamil as Manidhan Marivittan (1989). The film is considered as a cult classic in Malayalam cinema.

== Plot ==
K. Vishwanathan Pillai is an innocent young man in Alappuzha, who lives with his parents and his younger sister. When he takes a recess before a job interview, he gets mistaken by many for Uthaman, a hardcore criminal, and is arrested by the police. Luckily, George Kutty, the police inspector, happens to be a classmate of Vishwanathan and gets him released. George Kutty explains to Vishwanathan about the crimes of the doppelganger criminal, whose name is also only speculated and background is a mystery even to the police. With several criminal cases pending against Uthaman who remains on the run, Vishwanathan is warned to be cautious.

However, things become sour when the mistaken identity costs a marriage proposal for his sister and causes a rift between a lethargic Vishwanathan and his father.

Eventually, Vishwanathan gets a job in Kochi, the nearest city and falls in love with his co-worker Ambili. Soon enough, she accidentally runs into Uthaman who plans to assault her, which makes her hate Vishwanathan. Vishwanathan manages to convince her about the existence of his doppelganger, thus breaking the ice.

Mohandas, his boss in the company has a visitor in his office, who also mistakes Vishwanathan for the criminal, resulting in him losing his job. With a better marriage proposal now lined up for his sister and the subsequent pressure from his mother, Vishwanathan is now desperate for a face to face confrontation with Uthaman, while still in the dark about the criminal's whereabouts.

Trying to attract some leads, Vishwanathan poses as Uthaman and inadvertently receives a payment originally intended for him, thereby inviting the ire of the latter. Vishwanthan, who takes the money with him for his sister's marriage, is chased by Uthaman and his goons. In a bitter fight, Uthaman is accidentally stabbed to death by one of his goons. However, his body is mistaken to be that of Vishwanathan's, as the latter's bag containing his certificates and bank passbook was found near the body.

On reaching home, Vishwanathan witnesses his family performing his last rites on Uthaman's corpse. That night, Vishwanathan appears in front of his father, hands over the bag of money and explains the facts to him. His father consoles Vishwanathan and tries to bring him back. Vishwanathan refuses to go with him and decides to live as Uthaman for the rest of his life, as revealing that he is alive may cause further issues for himself and his family.

As Vishwanathan proceeds to leave back to the city, he stops by and glances at the burning pyre with a crooked smile on his face, leaving the viewers wondering whether the one who died was indeed Uthaman or Vishwanathan.

== Cast ==
- Jayaram in dual role as
  - K. Vishwanatha Pillai
  - Uthaman (voice dubbed by P. Padmarajan)
- Shobana as Ambili
- Madhu as Keshava Pillai, Vishwanathan's father
- Mukesh as George Kutty
- Jagathy Sreekumar as Santhosh, police head constable
- Sukumari as Lalitha, Vishwanathan's mother
- Jalaja as Sumangala teacher
- Shari as Anna, George Kutty's wife
- M. G. Soman as Mohandas, M.D, Vishwanathan's boss
- Parvathi as Sindhu, Vishwanathan's sister
- Innocent as Bhaskaran, office attender
- Valsala Menon as Meri Kuriyan Vishwanathan's office staff
- K. P. A. C. Sunny as Kuriyachan, boss's assistant
- Ajith Kollam as the criminal's accomplice
- Indrans as the postman
- Thesni Khan a member of the interview group
- Siddique
- V. K. Sreeraman as Muthalali
- Surasu as Thrikkottan Govinda Pillai
- James as Man at the Restaurant
- Balakrishna Pillai as Jail Officer
- Omanayamma as The Nun
- Bhasi as Hotel Manager
- Saleena as Neena Mathayi
- Krishnan Thrissur as Hotel waiter
- Aloor Elsy (Double Role)

== Reception ==
Aparan is now considered as a cult classic film in Malayalam cinema.

== Soundtrack ==
No songs in this film.

== Trivia ==
Aparan had no songs and featured just a handful of characters. The highlight of this film is that the imposter, whom Vishwanathan is mistaken to be, is never shown while being alive. It is only from the dialogues of other characters that we come to know about him. However, towards the end of the film, the imposter's voice is heard while threatening Vishwanathan over the phone. The only moment the imposter's face is clearly shown, is when his corpse is mistakenly placed at Vishwanathan's house for final rites.

Parvathy Jayaram, who acted as the sister of Jayaram, later married him in 1992. P. Padmarajan, who launched Jayaram, is also considered as his mentor in cinema. Later, Jayaram acted in two more films by P. Padmarajan.

The basic idea of the film is based on the short story "Aparan" by P. Padmarajan. The credit for the story has been given to Padmarajan and M. K. Chandrasekharan.
