= Koodevide =

1983 Indian film

Koodevide?
- Poster designed by Gayathri Ashokan
- Directed by: P. Padmarajan
- Screenplay by: P. Padmarajan
- Story by: Vasanthi
- Produced by: Rajan Joseph
- Starring: Mammootty; Suhasini; Rahman
- Cinematography: Shaji N. Karun
- Edited by: Madhu Kainakari
- Music by: Johnson
- Distributed by: Prakash Movietone
- Release date: 21 October 1983
- Running time: 150 minutes
- Country: India
- Language: Malayalam

Koodevide? (transl. Where is Your Nest?) is a 1983 Malayalam-language drama film, written and directed by P. Padmarajan, starring Mammootty, Suhasini, and Rahman. The film is based on the Tamil novel Moongil Pookkal by Vasanthi. It marked Rahman's film debut and Suhasini Maniratnam’s Malayalam debut. The film was a major commercial success and Padmarajan's first commercial hit.

== Plot ==
Alice is a teacher at a boarding school in Ooty. Ravi Puthooran, the prodigal and unruly son of the Member of Parliament Xavier Puthooran, joins the school in Alice's class. Alice manages to mentor him into becoming a good student. Alice's boyfriend, Captain Thomas, feels intensely jealous of the attention Alice shows to Ravi Puthooran. He accidentally kills the boy and surrenders to the police, leaving Alice frustrated in all aspects of her life.

== Cast ==
- Suhasini as Alice
- Mammootty as Captain Thomas
- Rahman as Ravi Puthooran
- Rejani Mohanan as Jaani
- Jose Prakash as Xavier Puthooran
- Manian Pillai Raju as Shankar
- Prem Prakash as Captain George
- Sukumari as Susan
- Devi as Daisy
- Kottayam Santha
- Anjali Naidu as Rajamma
- Noohu as Paappan Chettan

== Soundtrack ==
All lyrics are written by O. N. V. Kurup; all music is composed by Johnson.

No.	Title	Artist(s)	Length
1.	"Aadi Vaa Katte"	S. Janaki	4:59
2.	"Ponnurukum Pookkalam"	S. Janaki	4:22

== Awards ==
Koodevide won three Kerala State Film Awards and eight Kerala Film Critics Association Awards. It was also selected for screening in that year's Indian Panorama.

Kerala State Film Awards

- Best Film with Popular Appeal and Aesthetic Value
- Kerala State Film Award for Second Best Actor – Rahman
- Kerala State Film Award for Second Best Actress – Sukumari

Kerala Film Critics Association Awards

- Best Film
- Best Director – P. Padmarajan
- Best Actress – Suhasini
- Best Screenplay – P. Padmarajan
- Best Cinematographer – Shaji N. Karun
- Best Music Director – Johnson
- Best Lyricist – O. N. V. Kurup
- Best Female Playback Singer – S. Janaki
