= Sathrathil Oru Raathri =

- Directed by: N. Sankaran Nair
- Written by: P. Padmarajan
- Screenplay by: P. Padmarajan
- Starring: Kaviyoor Ponnamma; Prathapachandran; Sukumaran; M. G. Soman
- Cinematography: Ashok Kumar
- Edited by: Ravi
- Music by: G. Devarajan
- Production company: Deepthi Productions
- Distributed by: Deepthi Productions
- Release date: 16 June 1978
- Country: India
- Language: Malayalam

Sathrathil Oru Raathri is a 1978 Indian Malayalam film, directed by N. Sankaran Nair. The film stars Kaviyoor Ponnamma, Prathapachandran, Sukumaran and M. G. Soman in the lead roles. The film has musical score by G. Devarajan.

== Cast ==
- Kaviyoor Ponnamma
- Prathapachandran
- Sukumaran
- M. G. Soman
- Mamatha
- Manju Bhargavi
- Ravi Menon
- Vanchiyoor Radha

== Soundtrack ==
The music was composed by G. Devarajan and the lyrics were written by Yusufali Kechery.

No.	Song	Singers	Lyrics	Length (m:ss)
1	"Ezhu Swarangalil"	P. Susheela	Yusufali Kechery	
2	"Manassinte Chippiyile"	P. Madhuri	Yusufali Kechery	
3	"Praanapriye"	Karthikeyan	Yusufali Kechery	
4	"Prabhaatha Sheeveli"	K. J. Yesudas	Yusufali Kechery	
