= Perumthachan (film) =

1990 film directed by Ajayan

Perunthachan
- Poster designed by Gayathri Ashokan
- Directed by: Ajayan
- Written by: M. T. Vasudevan Nair
- Produced by: G. Jayakumar
- Starring: Thilakan; Prashanth; Monisha Unni; Vinaya Prasad; Nedumudi Venu; Babu Namboothiri
- Cinematography: Santhosh Sivan
- Edited by: M. S. Mani
- Music by: Johnson
- Production company: Bhavachitra
- Release date: 25 January 1991
- Running time: 120 minutes
- Country: India
- Language: Malayalam

Perumthachan (transl. Master Builder) is a 1991 Indian Malayalam-language period drama film directed by Ajayan and written by M. T. Vasudevan Nair. It is based on the legend of Perumthachan in the Parayi Petta Panthirukulam folklore. The problems caused by the generation gap are explored through the relationship between a skilled carpenter and his tradition-breaking son.

The film won the National Film Award for Best First Film of a Director and Filmfare Award for Best Film - Malayalam. It was nominated for the Golden Leopard Award and is now considered as a classic in Malayalam cinema. The film marks the debut of Prashanth in Malayalam cinema.

== Plot ==
In this story based on a Kerala legend, a pious and disciplined master carpenter of a mixed caste, Perumthachan, moves effortlessly in his world, constructing temples and carving intricate stone statues. He is content with his life, at peace with himself and the social norms of the time. In contrast, his son, Kannan Vishwakarman, has a rebellious nature and questions the traditional social hierarchies. Kannan falls in love with the daughter of a royal household, which ultimately leads to his downfall.

Raman Perumthachan is an exceptional wood-carver, sculptor, and architect. His creations are so remarkable that he is believed to be the reincarnation of the architect of the gods (Vishwakarma). Although raised as a carpenter from a family of Vishwakarma Brahmins (Vishwabrahmins), there are suggestions that he may be the son of a Nambudiri Brahmin (Orthodox Brahmins of Kerala). However, Perumthachan himself doubts this claim. At one point, he acknowledges with amusement his son's suggestion that the story of his Nambudiri lineage might have been fabricated by the Nambudiris to claim his abilities and prestige.

One evening, an old temple servant (Ambalavasi Brahmin) struggles to light a stone lamp due to strong winds. A man resting nearby gets up and places a stone slab to shield the lamp from the wind. The man, wearing the sacred thread (poonool), is mistaken for a Nambudiri, but he clarifies that he is a carpenter (Asari/Achary) who forgot to remove his sacred thread after constructing a temple. The servant soon realizes that this man is the legendary Perumthachan. News of his arrival spreads quickly.

Perumthachan reconnects with a childhood friend, a Nambudiri Brahmin who is now the head of a wealthy royal household (Kovilakam). He is asked to oversee the construction of the family's shrine and carve the image of the goddess. The beauty of Bhargavi Thampuratti, the Nambudiri's wife, captivates him, and he sculpts the goddess's face in her likeness. Although drawn to her, Perumthachan refrains from acting on his feelings, understanding the consequences. This attraction leads to a misunderstanding with the Nambudiri, who becomes suspicious of Perumthachan and insults him during the idol's consecration. Disillusioned, Perumthachan leaves.

Over time, Kannan grows into a talented and charismatic young man. While Perumthachan is proud of his son's abilities, he is concerned about Kannan's disregard for traditional artistic rules and his growing self-centeredness, which reflects the materialistic outlook of the younger generation. Perumthachan had long desired to build the Saraswati mandapam, as Bhargavi Thampuratti had wished, but Bhargavi's daughter, Kunhikkavu Thampuratti, selects Kannan for the task.

Kannan begins working at the same Nambudiri household where Perumthachan had once carved a statue of the goddess. During this time, Kannan falls in love with Kunhikkavu, causing a scandal within the royal family. The girl's father expresses his deep disappointment to Perumthachan, stating that he would have preferred Kannan's accidental death over the dishonor brought upon the family. Concerned about the impact on the household, Perumthachan steps in to oversee the temple's construction. He tries to convince Kannan to end the relationship, but Kannan refuses. In a moment of desperation, Perumthachan drops his chisel on Kannan's neck, killing him during the final stages of the temple's construction. Unable to bear the consequences, Perumthachan later sets fire to his home, taking his own life to escape the villagers’ retribution for Kannan's death.

== Cast ==
- Thilakan as Raman Perumthachan
- Prashanth as Kannan Vishwakarman, Perumthachan's son
- Vinaya Prasad as Bhargavi Thampuratti
- Nedumudi Venu as Unni Thampuran
- Monisha Unni as Kunjikkavu Thamburatti
- Jalaja as Devaki
- Manoj K. Jayan as Thirumangalam Neelakantan Nambudiri
- M.S. Thripunithura as Maani Embrandiri
- Babu Namboothiri as Kesavan
- T. P. Madhavan as Pramani, the village chief
- Kozhikode Narayanan Nair as Nedumbaram Mooss
- Adoor Pankajam as Unnimaya Valyamma
- Prabhakaran as Variar
- Sreelatha Menon as Thozhi
- Kozhikode Sarada as Keshavan's mother

== Production ==
This film was directed by Ajayan with Santosh Sivan as the cinematographer. The story was written by M.T. Vasudevan Nair and the warm background music was composed by Johnson. In the afterword to his book The Master Carpenter, M. T. Vasudevan Nair wrote that Ajayan first approached him for a screenplay of his story Manikkakkallu. That did not materialise and later he approached with another dream project Perumthachan. In the end of the afterword, M. T. thanks Ajayan for persuading him to write screenplay for Perumthachan.

== Reception ==
=== Critical response ===
In a 2005 article, Nimi Kurian of The Hindu wrote that "M.T. Vasudevan Nair has told this legendary story of the master carpenter with finesse, bringing to mind the old rituals and traditions and a world since long forgotten. He systematically builds up the suspense until ultimately the ending comes upon you surprisingly, almost shockingly, leaving you cold and unbelieving"."

=== Awards ===
- The film won Filmfare Award for Best Film - Malayalam received by G. Jayakumar
- National Film Award for Best Cinematography was won by Santhosh Sivan
