= Itha Ivide Vare =

1977 Indian film by I. V. Sasi

- Directed by: I. V. Sasi
- Written by: P. Padmarajan
- Based on: Itha Ivide Vare (1972) by P. Padmarajan
- Produced by: Hari Pothan
- Starring: Madhu; M. G. Soman; K. P. Ummer; Bahadoor; Jayabharathi; Sharada; Vidhubala; Meena
- Cinematography: Ramachandra Babu
- Edited by: K. Narayanan
- Music by: G. Devarajan
- Production company: Supriya Creations
- Release date: 27 August 1977
- Country: India
- Language: Malayalam

Itha Ivide Vare (transl. Just around here) is a 1977 Indian Malayalam-language revenge drama film directed by I. V. Sasi, written by P. Padmarajan, and produced by Hari Pothan. An adaptation of Padmarajan's 1972 novelette of the same name, the film stars Madhu, M. G. Soman, K. P. Ummer, Bahadoor, Jayabharathi, Sharada, Vidhubala and Meena.

With the box office success of the film, Soman became a "star" in Malayalam cinema. This was the first commercially successful script of Padmarajan.

== Cast ==
- Madhu as Tharavukaran Paily
- M. G. Soman as Vishwanathan
- K. P. Ummer as Vasu, Vishwanathan's father
- Bahadoor as Vakkachan
- Jayabharathi as Ammini
- Sharada as Janu, Ammini's mother
- Vidhubala as Susheela
- Meena as Janu's Mother
- Adoor Bhasi as Nanu
- Sreelatha Namboothiri as Shankari
- Kaviyoor Ponnamma as Kamalakshi
- Sankaradi as Shivaraman Nair
- Raghuraj as Young Vishwanathan
- K. P. A. C. Sunny as Thug
- Jayan as Boatman

== Production ==
The film is an adaptation of the novelette of the same name by P. Padmarajan, who also wrote the screenplay. It follows a ten-year-old boy who, after fleeing his home, returns 20 years later to take revenge on the man who destroyed his family. The title refers to one of the distinctive colloquial expressions of Central Travancore. This was one of the early films of Jayan, who portrayed a boatman and appears in the title song. The film's posters were designed by Neethi Kodungallur.

== Soundtrack ==
The music was composed by G. Devarajan and the lyrics were written by Yusufali Kechery. It was recorded at Arunachalam Studio in Tamil Nadu. C. Rajamani began his career in the film industry as an apprentice to Devarajan on this film.

No.	Song	Singers	Lyrics	Length (m:ss)
1	"Entho Etho"	P. Madhuri	Yusufali Kechery	
2	"Itha Itha Ivide Vare"	K. J. Yesudas	Yusufali Kechery	
3	"Naadodippaattinte"	P. Jayachandran, P. Madhuri	Yusufali Kechery	
4	"Raasaleela"	K. J. Yesudas	Yusufali Kechery	
5	Vennayo Vennilavuranjatho	Yesudas	Yusufali Kechery	

== Release ==
At the 22nd International Film Festival of Kerala (IFFK) in 2017, Itha Ivide Vare was screened in the "homage" section. It was one of the 47 films selected in various sections for portraying lives of "marginalized" people.

== Reception ==
=== Critical reception / Themes ===
In 1983, Tamil film journalist and critic T. M. Ramachandran of Film World magazine described the film as "outstanding in its treatment and presentation", while also remarking that Jayabharathi "did quite a few titillating scenes". In 1985, a critic for The Illustrated Weekly of India wrote that Soman's "anti-hero" character "went well with the audiences". In 2017, M. T. Saju of The Times of India wrote that the film "handled subjects like revenge at its deadliest form". Citing Itha Ivide Vare among other films, C. S. Venkiteswaran of Frontline noted that "in his [I. V. Sasi's] Padmarajan films, the themes of revenge, male sexuality and desire were central to the narrative".

Saraswathy Nagarajan of The Hindu remarked that Sasi's "path-breaking" films such as Itha Ivide Vare, Thrishna, and Eetta generated discussions for their themes, noting that Sasi "did not shy away from tackling sexuality and though it was sometimes in your face and raw,". In one scene, sexual intercourse is implied through a shot framed behind ducks, to avoid censorship by the Central Board of Film Certification. Referring to the scene, Sasi made the witty remark: "Nothing is there, yet everything is there".

=== Box office ===
Itha Ivide Vare was a commercial success at the box office, often described by labels such as "blockbuster". In 1985, The Illustrated Weekly of India wrote that "this film marked I. V. Sasi's first big hit around the country".

== Awards ==
- Filmfare Awards South: Best Film - Malayalam and Best Director - Malayalam (Sasi)
- Kerala State Film Critics Award for Best Actor — Madhu.

== Legacy ==
Following the film's success, Soman briefly attained superstardom in Malayalam cinema before being overshadowed by Jayan. In 1985, The Illustrated Weekly of India noted that the film "set the anti-hero trend by featuring in the lead role a drunken profligate who has mastered all the vices". Madhu's portrayal of a "rough and tough" character marked a departure from his usual peace-loving roles. He subsequently appeared in several films featuring similar characters, including Ithaa Oru Manushyan (1978), Eetta (1978), Njaan Njaan Maathram (1979), Shuddhikalasham (1979), and Raktham (1981).

In 2017, Jiby J. Kattakayam of The Times of India wrote that the film is "one of the first revenge dramas in Malayalam, a theme that inspired many subsequent films, and is hence considered a classic". That same year, R. Ayyappan of Deccan Chronicle described it as a "cult classic". The film also inspired a literary work by Malayalam writer Paul Zacharia. His book Bhaskara Patellar and Other Stories (1994) includes a short story titled "The Publicity Cart of the Film Itha Ivide Vare Sets Out". Writing for Outlook India, Kabir Deb observed that Zacharia used "the framework of a film to traverse Indian landscapes. The story bends time, stretches beyond the script and presents images that unsettle conventional description".

In 2018, filmmaker Kamal observed that Manju Warrier's character in Kannezhuthi Pottum Thottu (1999) resembles Jayabharathi's character in Itha Ivide Vare. Speaking at an event in 2025 about Padmarajan, Mohanlal recalled: "I was introduced to Padmarajan through the rich, imaginative voice I heard on Akashvani. Later, I watched films like Itha Ivide Vare and was left in awe."
