= Novemberinte Nashtam =

- Madhavi, Padmarajan and Ramachandran while filming the movie
- Directed by: P. Padmarajan
- Written by: P. Padmarajan
- Produced by: M. Abbas
- Starring: Madhavi; Ramachandran; Prathap Pothan; Surekha
- Cinematography: Ashok Kumar
- Edited by: Madhu Kainakari
- Music by: Background score: Gunasingh; Songs: M. G. Radhakrishnan; Varghese Kunnamkulam; Lyrics: Poovachal Khadar
- Production company: Charasma Movies
- Distributed by: Vijaya Movies
- Release date: 27 August 1982
- Country: India
- Language: Malayalam

Novemberinte Nashtam (transl. November's Loss) is a 1982 Malayalam-language romantic drama film written and directed by P. Padmarajan. It stars Madhavi, Ramachandran, Prathap Pothan and Surekha.

== Plot ==
The film is about a girl's emotional turmoil after a breakup and her ever supportive brother and how they try to get through the difficult period.

== Cast ==
- Madhavi as Meera
- Ramachandran as Balu, Meera's brother
- Prathap Pothan as Das, Meera's lover
- Surekha as Ambika, Balu's wife
- Nalini as Rekha, Meera's friend
- Bharath Gopi as Meera's father
- Thodupuzha Vasanthi

== Soundtrack ==
The music was composed by M. G. Radhakrishnan and K. C. Varghese Kunnamkulam with lyrics by Poovachal Khader.

| No. | Song | Singers | Lyrics | Length (m:ss) |
|---|---|---|---|---|
| 1 | "Arikilo Akaleyo" | K. S. Chithra, Arundhathi | Poovachal Khader | |
| 2 | "Arikilo Akaleyo" (Record Version) | K. S. Chithra, M. G. Sreekumar, Arundhathi | Poovachal Khader | |
| 3 | "Ekaanthathe Ninte" | K. J. Yesudas | Poovachal Khader | |
| 4 | "Ekaanthathe Ninte" | Jency | Poovachal Khader | |

== Production ==
The film was produced by Abbas Malayil under the banner of Charasma Films. He had, in 1979, produced the film Neelathamara, which was directed by Yusufali Kechery and written by M. T. Vasudevan Nair. Abbas returned to film production after three decades, with the film Parayan Baaki Vechathu (2013).

Padmarajan gave voice to Das, the character played by Prathap Pothan.
