= List of Malayalam films of 1986 =

The following is a list of Malayalam films released in the year 1986.

Opening		Sl. No.	Film	Cast	Director	Music director	Notes
J A N	2	1	Dhim Tharikita Thom	Raju, Lissy, Shankar	Priyadarshan	M. G. Radhakrishnan	
J A N	3	2	Pappan Priyappetta Pappan	Mohanlal, Rahman, Lissy	Sathyan Anthikkad	Alleppey Ranganath	
J A N	6	3	Naale Njangalude Vivaham	Shankar, Ahalya	Sajan	Shyam	
J A N	10	4	Annoru Ravil	Sukumaran, Ratheesh, Ranipadmini	M. R. Joseph	Raveendran	
J A N	11	5	Doore Doore Oru Koodu Koottam	Mohanlal, Menaka	Sibi Malayil	Shyam	
J A N	11	6	Ayalvasi Oru Daridravasi	Shankar, Menaka, Prem Nazir, Nedumudi Venu	Priyadarshan		
J A N	11	7	Bhagavan	Menaka, Madhuri	Baby	M. S. Viswanathan	
J A N	12	8	Aarundivide Chodikkan		Manoj Babu	A. T. Ummer	
J A N	16	9	Oru Katha Oru Nunakkatha	Nedumudi Venu, Madhavi	Mohan	Johnson	
J A N	17	10	Urukku Manushyan	Ratheesh, Sathaar	Crossbelt Mani	Guna Singh	
J A N	23	11	Shyama	Mammootty, Nadia Moidu	Joshiy	Raghu Kumar	
J A N	25	12	Ithile Iniyum Varu	Mammootty, Mukesh	P. G. Viswambharan	Shyam	
J A N	25	13	Mazha Peyyunnu Maddalam Kottunnu	Mohanlal, Lissie	Priyadarshan		
F E B	7	14	Abhayam Thedi	Mohanlal, Shobhana	I. V. Sasi	Shyam	
F E B	7	15	Kadinte Makkal		P. S. Prakash	Ramesh Naidu	
F E B	7	16	Sunil Vayassu 20	Rahman, Urvashi	K. S. Sethumadhavan	Jerry Amaldev	
F E B	11	17	T. P. Balagopalan M. A.	Mohanlal, Shobana	Sathyan Anthikkad	A. T. Ummer	
F E B	11	18	Malamukalile Deivam	Gabril, Suresh	P. N. Menon	Johnson	
F E B	16	19	Katturumbinum Kathu Kuthu	Jagathy Sreekumar, Innocent	Girish	Kannur Rajan	
F E B	21	20	Aalorungi Arangorungi	Mammootty, Shobhana	Thevalakkara Chellappan	Jerry Amaldev	
F E B	23	21	Sakhavu	Unnimary, Anuradha	K. S. Gopalakrishnan	V. D. Rajappan	
F E B	24	22	Oru Yugasandhya	Madhu, Srividya	Madhu	A. T. Ummer	
F E B	28	22	Vartha	Mohanlal, Mammootty	I. V. Sasi	A. T. Ummer	
M A R	1	23	Iniyum Kurukshetrum	Mohanlal, Jagathy Sreekumar	J. Sasikumar	M. K. Arjunan	
M A R	7	24	Nilaavinte Naattil	Prem Nazir, Seema	Vijay Menon	Shyam	
M A R	7	25	Niramulla Ravulkal	Suresh Gopi, Prameela	N. Sankaran Nair	K. J. Joy	
M A R	8	26	Revathikkoru Pavakkutty	Bharath Gopi, Mohanlal	Sathyan Anthikad	Shyam	
M A R	8	27	Chidambaram	Bharath Gopi, Smita Pattil	G. Aravindan	G. Devarajan	
M A R	17	28	Ardha Raathri	Ratheesh, Madhuri	Asha Khan	K. J. Joy	
M A R	17	29	Desatanakkili Karayarilla	Mohanlal, Shari, Kartika	Padmarajan	Raveendran	
M A R	21	30	Kariyilakkattu Pole	Mammootty, Mohanlal	P. Padmarajan	Johnson	
M A R	23	31	Chekkeranoru Chilla	Shankar, Ambika	Sibi Malayil	Shyam	
M A R	26	32	Hello My Dear Wrong Number	Mohanlal, Lizy	Priyadarshan	Reghu Kumar	
A P R	6	33	Kunjattakilikal	Mohanlal, Shobhana	J. Sasikumar	A. J. Joseph	
A P R	10	34	Ennennum Kannettante	Sangeeth, Sonia G. Nair	Fazil	Jerry Amaldev	
A P R	11	35	Malarum Kiliyum	Mammootty, Sudha Chandran	K. Madhu	Shyam	
A P R	11	36	Kshamichu Ennoru Vakku	Mammootty, Geetha	Joshiy	Shyam	
A P R	11	37	Nakhakshathangal	Vineeth, Monisha	Hariharan	Bombay Ravi	
A P R	12	38	Prathyekam Sradhikkukka	Mammootty, Mukesh	P. G. Vishwambharan	Raveendran	
A P R	26	39	Ente Entethu Mathrem	Mohanlal, Karthika	J. Sasikumar	Johnson	
M A Y	1	40	Arappatta Kettiya Gramathil	Mammootty, Ashokan	P. Padmarajan		
M A Y	2	41	Ithu Oru Thudakkom Mathram		Baby	Rajamani	
M A Y	9	42	Neram Pularumbol	Mammootty, Ramya Krishnan	K. P. Kumaran	Johnson	
M A Y	9	43	Poomukhappadiyil Ninneyum Kaathu	Mammootty, Srividya	Bhadran	Ilaiyaraaja	
M A Y	9	44	Chilambu	Shobhana, Rahman,	Bharathan	Ouseppachan	
M A Y	19	45	Ponnum Kudathinu Pottu	Shankar, Menaka	T. S. Suresh Babu	Shyam	
M A Y	23	46	Kaveri	Sitara, Mammootty	Rajeevnath	V. Dakshinamoorthy	
M A Y	28	47	Meenamasathile Sooryan	Shobhana, Venu Nagavally	Lenin Rajendran	M. B. Sreenivasan	
J U N	19	48	Adukkan Entheluppam	Mammootty, Karthika	Jeassy	Jerry Amaldev	
J U N	19	49	Snehamulla Simham	Mammootty, Nalini	Sajan	Shyam	
J U N	19	50	Mizhineerppoovukal	Mohanlal, Lisie	Kamal	M. K. Arjunan	
J U N	25	51	Karinagam	Ratheesh, Anuradha	K. S. Gopalakrishnan	A. T. Ummer	
J U N	29	52	Bharya Oru Manthri	Menaka, Sukumaran	Raju Mahendra	Kannur Rajan	
J U L	4	53	Gandhinagar 2nd Street	Mohanlal, Karthika	Sathyan Anthikad	Shyam	
J U L	5	54	Panchagni	Mohanlal, Geetha	Hariharan	Bombay Ravi	
J U L	17	55	Rajavinte Makan	Mohanlal, Ambika	Thambi Kannanthanam	S. P. Venkatesh	
J U L	18	56	Nidhiyude Katha	Murali, Jalaja	Vijayakrishnan	M. G. Radhakrishnan	
J U L	20	57	Onnu Randu Moonnu	Urvashi, Ratheesh	Rajasenan	Rajasenan	
J U L	25	58	Ithramathram	Urvashi, Ratheesh	P. Chandrakumar	Raghu Kumar	
A U G	1	59	Yuvajanotsavam	Mohanlal, Urvashi	Sreekumaran Thampi	Raveendran	
A U G	1	60	Atham Chithira Chothy	Mukesh, Nadia Moidu	A. T. Abu	Shyam	
A U G	12	61	Nandi Veendum Varika	Mammootty, Urvashi	P. G. Viswambharan	Shyam	
A U G	15	62	Aayiram Kannukal	Mammootty, Shobhana	Joshiy	Raghu Kumar	
A U G	15	63	Moonnu Masangalku Mumbu	Mammootty, Urvashi	Cochin Haneefa	Shyam	
A U G	29	64	Ice Cream	Mammootty, Lissy	Antony Eastman	Johnson	
S E P	3	65	Udayam Padinjaru	Madhu, Srividya	Madhu	A. T. Ummer	
S E P	9	66	Surabhi Yaamangal	Jagathy Sreekumar, Ratheesh	P. Ashok Kumar	Kannur Rajan	
S E P	12	67	Aavanazhi	Mammootty, Geetha	I. V. Sasi	Shyam	
S E P	12	68	Vivahithare Ithile	Balachandra Menon, Parvati	Balachandra Menon	Jerry Amaldev	
S E P	12	69	Poovinu Puthiya Poonthennal	Mammootty, Nadia Moidu	Fazil	Kannur Rajan	
S E P	14	70	Nyayavidhi	Mammootty, Shobhana	Joshiy	M. K. Arjunan	
S E P	15	71	Pidikittapulli	Prameela, Ratheesh	K. S. Gopalakrishnan	K. J. Joy	
S E P	16	72	Nimishangal	Mohanlal, Jagathy Sreekumar	Radhakrishnan (RK)	M. B. Sreenivasan	
S E P	19	73	Sukhamo Devi	Mohanlal, Shankar	Venu Nagavally	M. B. Sreenivasan	
S E P	19	74	Adiverukal	Mohanlal, Karthika	P. Anil		
O C T	2	75	Ee Kaikalil	Ratheesh, Seema	K. Madhu	Johnson	
O C T	3	76	Oppam Oppathinoppam	Shankar, Menaka	Soman	Jerry Amaldev	
O C T	4	77	Kulambadikal	Jagathy Sreekumar, Ashwathy	Crossbelt Mani	Guna Singh	
O C T	7	78	Ninnistham Ennishtam	Mohanlal, Priya	Alleppey Ashraf	Kannur Rajan	
O C T	7	79	Njan Kathorthirikkum	Rohini, Kundara Johnny	Rasheed Karapuzha	Shyam	
O C T	9	80	Veendum	Mammootty, Ratheesh	Joshiy	Ouseppachan	
O C T	9	81	Geetham	Mammootty, Gita			
O C T	9	82	Thalavattam	Mohanlal, Kartika	Priyadarshan	Raghu Kumar	
O C T	9	83	Pakarathinu Pakaram		T. Krishna		
O C T	14	84	Ambadi Thannilorunni	Jagathy Sreekumar, Anand	Alleppey Ranganath	Alleppey Ranganath	
O C T	16	85	Sree Narayana Guru	Kanakalatha, Master Vaisakh	P. A. Bakker	G. Devarajan	
O C T	20	86	Onnu Muthal Poojyam Vare	Asha Jayaram, Mohanlal	Reghunath Paleri	Mohan Sithara	
O C T	23	87	Ente Shabdham	Jagathy Sreekumar, Ratheesh	V. K. Unnikrishnan	A. T. Ummer	
O C T	31	88	Sanmanassullavarkku Samadhanam	Mohanlal, Karthika	Sathyan Anthikkad	Jerry Amaldev	
O C T	31	89	Koodanayum Kattu	Innocent, Mukesh	I. V. Sasi	Shyam	
N O V	7	90	Ayalvasi Oru Daridravasi	Prem Nazir, Seema	Priyadarshan	M. G. Radhakrishnan	
N O V	7	91	Padayani	Mammootty, Devan	T. S. Mohan	A. T. Ummer	
N O V	7	92	Railway Cross	Anuradha, Bheeman Raghu	KG Gopalakrishnan	A. T. Ummer	
N O V	11	93	Sayam Sandhya	Mammootty, Gita	Joshiy	Shyam	
N O V	1	90	Namukku Parkkan Munthirithoppukal	Mohanlal, Shari	P. Padmarajan	Johnson	
N O V	14	95	Rakkuyilin Ragasadassil	Mammootty, Suhasini	Priyadarshan	M. G. Radhakrishnan	
N O V	14	96	Aval Kaathirunnu Avanum	Mammootty, Suhasini	P. G. Vishwambharan	Shyam	
N O V	15	97	Cabaret Dancer	Anuradha, M. G. Soman	N. Sankaran Nair	Shyam	
N O V	22	98	Swamy Sreenarayana Guru	Adoor Bhavani, K. P. A. C. Azeez	Krishnaswamy	Mohammed Subair	
N O V	28	99	Kochu Themmadi	Mammootty, Adoor Bhasi	A. Vincent	G. Devarajan	
N O V	28	100	Ambili Ammavan	Jagathy Sreekumar, Nedumudi Venu	K. G. Vijayakumar	Kannur Rajan	
D E C	2	101	Akalangalil	Nedumudi Venu, Seema	J. Sasikumar	Johnson	
D E C	5	102	Ilanjippookkal	Sandhya, Ratheesh	Sandhya Mohan	Kannur Rajan	
D E C	6	103	Shobaraj	Mohanlal, Madhavi	Sasikumar	Gemini	
D E C	19	104	Rareeram	Mammootty, Shobhana	Sibi Malayil	Kodakara Madhavan	
D E C	19	105	Ennu Nathante Nimmi	Mammootty, Radhu	Sajan	Shyam	
D E C	22	106	Love Story	Shafeeq, Rohini,	Sajan	Shyam	
D E C	25	107	Ashtabandham	Srividya, Mukesh	Askar	A. T. Ummer	
D E C	25	108	Amma Ariyan	Kunhulakshmi Amma, Harinarayan	John Abraham	Sunitha	
D E C	28	109	Pandavapuram	James, Appu	G. S. Panicker		
D E C	31	110	Purushartham	Adoor Bhasi, Sujatha Mehta	K. R. Mohan		
			Pranamam				
			Viswasichalum Illenkilum				
			Manasilloru Manimuthu				
			Ariyaatha Bandham				
			Samskaram				

== Dubbed films ==
Movie	Direction	Story	Screenplay	Main Actors
Priyamvadakkoru Pranayageethom	Chandrasekhar			
Prathikale Thedi				
Paka Varuthiya Vina				
Thalamurakulude Prathikaram	T. Prasad			
Rekthabhishekam	D. Rajendra Babu			
Aa Bheekara Raathri				
Agniyanu Njan Agni	Kothanda Rama Reddy			
Prakruthiyile Adbhudangal				
Anaswara Ganangal	Boban Kunchako			
