= Ouseppachan =

Indian film composer

- Born: M. L. Ouseppachan; 13 September 1955 (age 71)
- Origin: Ollur, Thrissur, Kerala, India
- Genres: Film score; Classical
- Occupations: Music director; Music producer; Violinist; Singer
- Instrument: Violin
- Years active: 1978–present

Mechery Louis Ouseppachan (born 13 September 1955), known mononymously as Ouseppachan, is an Indian film composer and singer who primarily works in Malayalam films. He is a recipient of National Film Award, Filmfare Award and Kerala State Film Awards for his numerous film soundtrack albums and background scores.

== Early life ==
Ouseppachan was born to Mathiri Paliakkara and Louis of the Mechery house on 13 September 1955 in Ollur, Thrissur, Kerala, India.

== Career ==
He started his music career as violinist in some music troupes including Voice of Trichur. Later he got the chance to be the violinist in concerts of renowned playback singer Madhuri. He later became the violinist under music director Paravoor Devarajan master.

His first work in the film industry was the film Eenam, for which he set the background score. He also composed additional background music for the film Aaravam (1979) in which he also played the role of a fiddle player, however Kathodu Kathoram (1985), directed by Bharathan is considered as his debut. Ouseppachan's work was noted for the film and three songs from the film became super hits. These songs were noted also for the immense use of violin. This may be attributed to the facts that Ousephachan himself is a violinist and that the protagonist of the film played by Mammootty is also a violinist.

Ousephachan then went on to compose music for over 200 films. He also composed songs for the non-commercial English film Freaky Chakra, directed by V.K. Prakash and background scores for various Hindi films, notably directed by Priyadarshan. His non-film songs include popular albums like Onapoothalam, Vasanthageetangal and many Christian devotional songs. Aside from music direction, he had taken up a spot as a judge for Asianet's Idea Star Singer 2008 and also as a judge for Kairali TV's Gandharva Sangeetham 2012.

== Selected discography ==
=== Malayalam films ===
Year	Title	Remarks
1978	Aaravam	Debut Film. Background score only.
1983	Eenam	Background score only.
1985	Kathodu Kathoram	Debut film as music director for songs.
1986	Chilambu	
1986	Pranamam	
1986	Veendum	
1987	Neelakkurinji Poothappol	Background score only
1987	Venmegha Hamsangal	
1987	January Oru Orma	
1987	Kathakku Pinnil	
1987	Ponnu	
1987	Unnikale Oru Kadha Parayam	Winner Kerala State Film Award for Best Music Director
1988	Mrithyunjayam	
1988	Oru Muthassi Katha	
1988	Dinarathrangal	
1988	Orkkappurathu	Background score only
1988	Kakkothikkavile Appooppan Thaadikal	
1988	Witness	
1988	Mukunthetta Sumitra Vilikkunnu	
1988	Vicharana	
1989	Alicinte Anveshanam	Background score only
1989	Varnam	
1989	Vandanam	
1989	Bhadrachitta	
1989	Oru Sayahnathinte Swapnam	
1989	Mahayanam	
1990	Smrithikal	
1990	Purappadu	
1990	No.20 Madras Mail	
1990	Akkare Akkare Akkare	
1990	Thoovalsparsham	
1991	Sundarikakka	Background Score only
1991	Ulladakkam	
1991	Aavanikunnile Kinnaripookkal	
1991	Pookkalam Varavayi	
1991	Mookkilyarajyathu	
1992	Ennodishtam Koodamo	Background Score only
1992	Aayushkalam	
1993	Aacharyan	
1993	Varam	
1993	Bhoomigeetham	
1993	Akashadoothu	
1994	Nandini Oppol	
1994	Sagaram Sakshi	Background Score only
1994	Adukkalakaryam	
1994	Njan Kodeeshwaran	
1994	Gamanam	
1995	Anna	
1995	Arabia	
1995	Sargavasantham	
1996	Mercara	
1996	Akashathekkoru Kilivathil	
1996	Dilliwala Rajakumaran	
1996	Madamma	
1997	Suvarna Simhaasanam	
1997	Lelam	
1997	Aniyathi Pravu	
1998	Kattathoru Penpoov	Background Score only
1998	Sundarakilladi	
1998	Meenathil Thalikettu	
1998	Sooryaputhran	
1998	Harikrishnans	
1999	Janani	
1999	Vazhunnor	
1999	Njangal Santhushtaranu	
1999	Megham	
1999	Olympiyan Anthony Adam	
1999	Chandamama	
2000	Life Is Beautiful	
2000	Darling Darling	
2001	Swarnachirakumay	
2001	Meghasandesam	Background Score only
2001	Ee Parakkum Thalika	
2002	Director Bhadrans Assistant Film	
2002	Vincent John Film	
2002	Mazhathullikkilukkam	Background Score only
2002	Kai Ethum Doorathu	
2003	Mullavalliyum Thenmavum	
2003	Kasthooriman	
2003	Ente Veedu Appuvinteyum	
2003	Swapnam Kondu Thulabharam	
2003	Valathott Thirinjal Nalamathe Veed	Background Score only
2003	Varum Varunnu Vannu	
2004	Greetings	Background Score only
2004	Sasneham Sumithra	
2004	Vismayathumbathu	
2004	Kerala House Udan Vilpanakku	
2004	Vajram	
2004	Made In USA	Background Score Only
2004	Thekkekkara Superfast	
2005	Naran	Background Score Only
2005	Udayananu Tharam	Background Score Only
2005	Deepangal Sakshi	
2005	Thaskaraveeran	
2005	Police	
2005	Udayon	
2005	Kadha	
2006	Chakkaramuthu	Background Score Only
2006	Vargam	Background Score Only
2006	Bhargavacharitham Moonam Khandam	Background Score Only
2006	Speed Track	Background Score Only
2006	Vadakkumnathan	Background Score Only
2006	Lion	Background Score Only
2006	Oruvan	
2006	Moonnamathoral	
2007	Heart Beats	Background Score Only
2007	Bharathan Effect	Background Score Only
2007	Inspector Garud	Background Score Only
2007	Nivedyam	Background Score Only
2007	Janmam	
2007	Abraham & Lincoln	
2007	Changathipoocha	
2007	Pranayakalam	
2007	July 4	
2007	Ore Kadal	Winner: National Film Award for Best Music Direction; Kerala State Film Award for Best Background Score
2007	Nazrani	Background Score Only
2008	Parunthu	Background Score Only
2008	Calcutta News	Background Score Only
2008	Magic Lamp	
2008	College Kumaran	
2009	Kerala Cafe	Background Score Only
2009	Makante Achan	Background Score Only
2009	Banaras	Background Score Only
2009	Moz & Cat	
2009	Angel John	
2009	Hailesa	
2010	Body Guard	
2010	Aagathan	
2010	Black Stallion	
2010	Shikkar	Background Score only
2010	Pranchiyettan and The Saint	
2011	Kalikaalam	
2011	Three Kings	
2011	London Dreams	
2011	Bangkok Summer	
2011	Aidondla Aidu	
2011	Karmayogi	
2012	Fathers Day	Background Score Only
2012	Thiruvambadi Thampan	
2012	Arike	
2012	DYSP Shankunni Uncle	
2012	Ayalum Njanum Thammil	
2012	Parudeesa	
2013	Ith Pathiramanal	Background Score Only
2013	Dolls	Background Score Only
2013	Musafir	
2013	Mazhaneerthullikal	
2013	Green Apple	
2013	Nadan	Winner: Kerala State Film Award for Best Music Director; SIIMA Award for Best Music Director
2014	Nagara Varidhi Naduvil Njan	Background Score Only
2014	Odum Raja Aadum Raani	Background Score Only
2014	Entethallatha Karanathal	
2014	No Parking	
2014	Karanavar	
2014	Garbhasreemaan	
2015	Once upon a time there was a kallan	
2015	Appavum Veenjum	
2015	Nirnnayakam	Background Score Only
2015	Utopiayile Rajavu	
2015	Kanal	
2016	John Honay	Background Score Only
2016	The Last Days	
2016	Kadalas Pookkal	
2016	Jalam	
2016	Ayaal Jeevichiripundu	
2016	Shyam	
2017	Gold Coins	
2017	Minnaminungu	
2017	Aakasha Mittayee	Background Score Only
2018	Kavadiyum Vithum	
2018	Kuthira Powen	
2018	Oru Kuprasidha Payyan	
2018	Panchavarnathatha	Background Score Only
2018	Hey Jude	
2018	Ennaalum Sarath..?	
2019	Evidey	
2019	12 c	
2020	Oru Rathri Oru Pakal	
2021	Vaanku	
2021	Ellam Sheriyakum	Actor also
2022	Autorickshawkarante Bharya	
2023	Pappachan Olivilanu	
2023	Akkuvinte Padachon	Background Score Only
2024	Ithuvare	
2024	Manorathangal	Web Series
2025	Besty	
2025	Machante Maalakha	
2025	Krishnashtami: the book of dry leaves †	

=== Other language films ===
Year	Title	Language	Remarks
2003	Freaky Chakra	English	
2010	Bumm Bumm Bole	Hindi	Background Score Only
2010	Khatta Meetha	Hindi	Background Score Only
2010	Aakrosh	Hindi	Background Score Only
2011	Dam 999	English	Contains Hindi songs
2011	Aidondla Aidu	Kannada	
2012	Kamaal Dhamaal Malamaal	Hindi	Background Score Only
2014	Shutter	Marathi	Background Score Only
2020	Maddy Engira Madavan	Tamil	Unreleased film
2020	Thai Nilam	Tamil	Released in 2026
2023	Route No:17	Tamil	
2023	Signal Man	Kannada	

== Awards ==
National Film Awards:

- 2007 – Best Music Direction: Ore Kadal

Filmfare Awards South:

- 2007 – Filmfare Award for Best Music Director – Malayalam: Ore Kadal

Kerala State Film Awards:

- 1987 – Best Music Director: Unnikale Oru Kadha Parayam
- 2007 – Best Background Music: Ore Kadal
- 2013 – Best Music Director: Nadan
