= Padamadan =

Padamadan is a surname of South Indian origin, from a royal ruling-class lineage found in the Dutch-influenced regions of Vypin in Kerala, India.

== Pronunciation ==
The surname contains an added stress on the third syllable, with a longer "a" sound.

== Etymology ==
The royal Padamadan lineage ruled over the plains (known as the Padam in the local language of Malayalam, rooted from the Sanskrit language). Madan or Maadan denotes the royal lordship status: one who rules over and is in divine command of.

Another related etymology of the surname is the clan or family that ruled with force "in command of the armies", "in command of the people", or "in command of the armies of the plains", which are translations of the surname.

Oral histories indicate an antiquity of at least a 2000 years with an early family origin from the Karnatak regions near Mysore.

== History ==
Padamadans were not included in the royal families accredited during the formation of the Republic of India and State of Kerala in 1956 as the lineage boycotted and resisted many foreign colonilization attempts interfering in the region.

Despite lost oral and historical accounts the lineage remains and is recognized as one of the significant influential royal houses in the peripheral Vypin territories adjacent to the major royal houses who ruled the significant territories of Malabar, Cochin, Travancore and others.

The mountains of Kerala were once dense impregnable forests meeting fresh water backwaters that connected down to the sea. These backwater regions of mid-Kerala were quite productive agriculturally and with ample fishing, cashew and spice industries.

Oral stories archived on palm and copper tablets passed down through the generations indicate an antiquity of at least 2000 years with an early family origin from the Karnatak regions near Mysore.

These preserved histories record the royal lineage originating in the Karnatak regions in military service to the Raj of Mysore as War Generals defending those territories from Northern invaders. For their honourable service to the Raj of Mysore, the Padamadans were granted lordship over the Vypin territories in Kerala.

These histories also recount the Padamadans serving in diplomatic roles with Chinese emissaries sent by the Emperor of China, who stayed in Kerala for several months in the Vypin regions. During these cultural exchanges the Padamadans educated the Chinese on advanced irrigation techniques for rice agriculture, astronomy and mathematics, philosophical and Vedic concepts, and remedies from Ayurvedic medicine practiced by the family for generations.

In exchange, the Chinese showed the Padamadans the benefits of installing Chinese nets and techniques for maintaining (manually dredging) ports in the difficult coastline areas in the Vypin territory.

== Notable family members ==
- George Padamadan, mathematician and philosopher; published three papers, all through Rensselaer Polytechnic Research Institute, New York: An Amateur Look on the Fallibilist Epistemology of Mathematics (1993); Creative Dynamism at the Root of the Evolution of Mathematical Sciences (2002); Logical Paradoxes and their Formal Resolution (2002). "An Amateur Looks on the Fallibilist Epistemology of Mathematics", challenged the findings of 'Proof and Analysis Theory' from Proofs and Refutations by the Hungarian philosopher Imre Lakatos.
- Roshan Francis Padamadan, CNN Economic Media Consultant; Frontier and Emerging Market Asset Manager with flagship fund focussed on South and Southeast Asia. Operations Officer. Compliance Officer.
- Laji George Padamadan, President of ENL Mechanical Incorporated a premier mechanical contractor in New York City; Singer and songwriter of the band Pseutopia with notable musical collaborations with Grammy award winning former drummer of Pearl Jam - David Abbruzzese.

=== Characters ===
- Samuel Padamadan, character in Sundhari Kakka
- Sundeep Agrawal Padamadan, character in Legally Blonde (musical)
- Jaimy Padamadan, character in The Metro (film)
