= Sudhakar Mangalodayam =

Indian writer and screenwriter (1956–2020)

- Born: 14 January 1956; Velloor, Vaikom, Kottayam, Kerala, India
- Died: 17 July 2020 (aged 64); Velloor, Vaikom, Kottayam, Kerala, India
- Occupations: Writer, screenwriter
- Spouse: Usha (m. 1988)
- Children: Sreevidya
- Parents: Parameswaran Nair (father); Janakiamma (mother)
- Writing career
- Genres: Fiction, cinema
- Notable works: Murappennu; Nandini Oppol; Maunasarovaram; Namam Japikkunna Veedu; Padasaram; Safalam; Chitta; Thillana; Amma; Kungumappottu

Sudhakar P. Nair (14 January 1956 – 17 July 2020), popularly known as Sudhakar Mangalodayam, was an Indian writer of Malayalam literature, and a story writer and screenwriter in Malayalam cinema. He was known for his popular novels as well as the screenplay of Njan Ekananu, a 1982 Malayalam language film. He was the author of over 50 novels, and wrote the story for films such as Kariyilakkattu Pole, Nandini Oppol and Vasantha Sena.

== Biography ==
Sudhakar Mangalodayam was born Sudhakar P. Nair in Velloor, in Vaikom, in Kottayam district of the south Indian state of Kerala, to Parameswaran Nair and Janakiamma. After schooling at St. Ignatius School, Kanjiramattom, he did his college education at NSS College, Ottapalam from where he obtained his graduate degree. He started writing during this period, starting with radio plays. Later, he served as an assistant to noted film director, P. Chandrakumar. Soon, he started writing novels and published them as serials in periodicals, sometimes writing up to nine novels simultaneously.

Sudhakar Mangalodayam, who followed the literary style popularized by such writers as MT Vasudevan Nair, wrote over 50 novels which include Murappennu, Nandini Oppol, Koodappirappu, Maunasarovaram, Namam Japikkunna Veedu, Padasaram, Safalam, Chitta, Thillana, Amma and Kungumappottu. His foray into films was with Njan Ekananu, a 1982 film directed by P. Chandrakumar, for which he wrote the story, screenplay and dialogues. Subsequently, he wrote the story for three more films, Vasantha Sena (1985), Kariyilakkattu Pole (1986) and Nandini Oppol (1994).

Sudhakar was married to G. Usha and the couple had a daughter, Sreevidya. He died on 17 July 2020, at the age of 64, succumbing to age-related illnesses; his wife had predeceased him.

== Selected bibliography ==
- Mangalodayam, Sudhakar. Thalakh (in Malayalam). CICC Book House. p. 134. ISBN 9789350930014.
- Mangalodayam, Sudhakar. Krishnathulasi (in Malayalam). CICC Book House. p. 212. ISBN 9789350930205.
- Mangalodayam, Sudhakar. Venalveedu (in Malayalam). CICC Book House. p. 276. ISBN 9789350930212.
- Mangalodayam, Sudhakar. Hamsathadakam (in Malayalam). CICC Book House. p. 182. ISBN 9789350930472.
- Mangalodayam, Sudhakar. Chamaram (in Malayalam). CICC Book House. p. 264. ISBN 9788171749553.
- Mangalodayam, Sudhakar. Oru Sisira Ravil (in Malayalam). CICC Book House. p. 135.
- Mangalodayam, Sudhakar. Padaswaram (in Malayalam). CICC Book House. p. 100.
- Mangalodayam, Sudhakar. Ottakolussu (in Malayalam). CICC Book House. p. 280. ISBN 9789350930595.
- Mangalodayam, Sudhakar. Pachakuthira (in Malayalam). CICC Book House. p. 172. ISBN 9788171749546.
- Mangalodayam, Sudhakar. Kavadichinthu (in Malayalam). CICC Book House. p. 110.
- Mangalodayam, Sudhakar. Chuvappu Koodarangal (in Malayalam). CICC Book House. p. 160.
- Mangalodayam, Sudhakar. Poomancham (in Malayalam). CICC Book House. p. 100. ISBN 9789350930045.
- Mangalodayam, Sudhakar. Mudiyettu (in Malayalam). CICC Book House. p. 100.
- Mangalodayam, Sudhakar. Panchali (in Malayalam). CICC Book House. p. 130.
- Mangalodayam, Sudhakar. Swantham Radha (in Malayalam). CICC Book House. p. 100.
- Mangalodayam, Sudhakar. Padavinyasam (in Malayalam). CICC Book House. p. 115.
- Mangalodayam, Sudhakar. Pranamam (in Malayalam). CICC Book House. p. 80.
- Mangalodayam, Sudhakar. Sooryane Snehicha Thamara (in Malayalam). CICC Book House. p. 175.
- Mangalodayam, Sudhakar. Thillana (in Malayalam). CICC Book House. p. 115.
- Mangalodayam, Sudhakar. Vasthubhali (in Malayalam). CICC Book House. p. 115.
- Mangalodayam, Sudhakar. Ottuvala (in Malayalam). CICC Book House. p. 135.
- Mangalodayam, Sudhakar. Althara (in Malayalam). CICC Book House. p. 110.
- Mangalodayam, Sudhakar. Oru Poovinte Moham. CICC Book House. ASIN 8171748449.
- Mangalodayam, Sudhakar. Vellithira. CICC Book House. ASIN 8171749496.
- Mangalodayam, Sudhakar. Poomanjam. CICC Book House. ASIN 9350930048.
- Mangalodayam, Sudhakar (7 February 2012). Kilivaathil. CICC Book House.
- Mangalodayam, Sudhakar. Penmakkal. CICC Book House. ASIN 9385366211.
- Mangalodayam, Sudhakar (1995). Velutta Chemparatti. Current Books. ISBN 8124002533.
- Mangalodayam, Sudhakar. Priye Charuseele. Saikatham Books. p. 207.
- Mangalodayam, Sudhakar. Suvarnayude Bharthavu. Saindhava Books. p. 279.
- Mangalodayam, Sudhakar. Njangal Sukhamayirikkunnu. Saindhava Books. p. 230.

== Filmography ==
Year	Title	Screenplay	Story	Dialogues	Director
1982	Njan Ekananu	Yes	Yes	Yes	P. Chandrakumar
1985	Vasantha Sena	No	Yes	No	K. Vijayan
1986	Kariyilakkattu Pole	No	Yes	No	P. Padmarajan
1994	Nandini Oppol	No	Yes	No	Mohan Kupleri
1997	Kaliyoonjal	No			
