= Valsala Menon =

Indian actress

- Born: Thrissur, Kerala, India
- Occupation: Actress
- Years active: 1985–present
- Spouse: Kalappurakal Haridasan Nair
- Children: 3

Valsala Menon is an Indian film and television actress, who works predominantly in Malayalam films. She has acted in over 500+ films. Until recently, she was active in both, Malayalam films and television serials.

== Early life ==
Menon was born to Raman Menon and Devakiyamma in Thrissur District. She has three elder brothers and one sister. Since early childhood she has learned classical dancing and has performed on various stages in the august audience of leaders and rulers of the time. She came into industry as a child artist Baby Valsala in Malayalam movie Thiramala in 1953. She got married at the age of 16 and settled at Bombay. She became Miss Thrissur in 1970 after giving birth to three children. She had taken dance, Malayalam classes in Bombay. She was active in Ladies Club also, there. Although there was innumerable offers for her to act in films post her marriage, she made a comeback to films in Kiratham released in 1985 once her children had finished their schooling and was on their own. She became noted through Parinayam 1994. Since then she is acting in movies in supporting characters . as well as in a number of tele serials in character roles. She has also appeared in advertisements.

== Personal life ==
Menon was married to Late Kalappurakal Haridas in 1961. Haridas was working as an engineer at Bombay. The couple have three sons Prakash, Prem and Priyan. Prakash Menon is working in Australia, Prem Menon in Australia too and Priyan Menon in Kochi. Her husband died in 1991.

== Partial filmography ==
=== Films ===
==== 1950s ====
Year	Title	Role	Notes
1953	Thiramala	Muthaiah's daughter	

==== 1980s ====
Year	Title	Role	Notes
1985	Bheekararathri		
1985	Kiratham	Kamalam	
1985	Shathru	Raghu's mother	
1985	Karimpinpoovinakkare	Nurse	
1986	Vivahithare Ithile		
1986	Ithu Oru Thudakkom Mathram		
1986	Karinagam		
1986	Onnu Randu Moonnu	Mrs. Menon	
1986	Njan Kathorthirikkum	Noorudeen's umma	
1986	Koodanayum Kattu	Travel agency staff	
1986	Naale Njangalude Vivaham	Mini's mother	
1986	Ice Cream	Devaki	
1986	Atham Chithira Chothy	Kamala Nair	
1986	Dheem Tharikida Thom	Revathy's mother	
1986	Kulambadikal	Susan's mother	
1986	Ente Entethu Mathrem	Mother Superior	
1986	Chekkeranoru Chilla	Shobha	
1986	Mizhineerppoovukal	Kuttimalu Amma	
1986	Pranamam	Damu's mother	
1986	Kariyilakkattu Pole	Actress's mother	
1986	Uppu	Mariyambi	
1986	Adukkan Entheluppam	Dr. Jameela	
1986	Sunil Vayassu 20	Sunil's mother	
1987	Vaiki Odunna Vandi		
1987	Kaanan Kothichu		
1987	Athinumappuram	Dr. Padma	
1987	Vrutham	Charlie's Ammayi	
1987	Ivide Ellavarkkum Sukham	Sethu Raman's mother	
1987	Itha Samayamayi	Jagadhamma	
1987	Neeyethra Dhanya	Nun	
1987	Oridathu	Rema's mother	
1987	Manasa Maine Varu	Dance teacher	
1987	Vilambaram	Valsala's mother	
1987	Kaalam Maari Kadha Maari	Kamarudden's mother	
1987	Theertham	Bank Manager	
1987	Unnikale Oru Kadha Parayam	Thomas Ebraham's wife	
1987	Sruthi	Karthyayani	
1987	Thaniyavarthanam	Balan's aunt	
1987	Adimakal Udamakal	Madhavi	
1987	Manja Manthrangal	Issac's mother	
1988	Vice Chancellor		
1988	Samvalsarangal		
1988	Janmandharam	Unni's mother	
1988	Oozham	Seetha's mother	
1988	Mrithyunjayam	College lecturer	
1988	Mattoral	Shop keeper	
1988	Aparan	Viswanathan's office staff	
1988	Vaisali	Old lady	
1988	Pattanapravesham	Prabhakaran Thampi's wife	
1988	Isabella	Headmistress	
1988	Abkari	Madhavi	
1988	Kandathum Kettathum	Office worker	
1988	1921	Valiyamma	
1988	Aranyakam	Mohan's mother	
1988	Orkkapurathu	Sherin's mother	
1988	Moonnam Mura	Bharathan Menon's wife	
1989	Rathibhavam		
1989	Unni	Mrs. Thomas	
1989	Varnatheru	Mrs. James	
1989	Mudra	Kalyaniyamma	
1989	Bhadrachitta	Bhadra's mother	
1989	Ashokante Ashwathykuttikku	Savithri	
1989	Kaalal Pada	Hostel Matron	
1989	Carnivel	Kamalamma	
1989	Ulsavapittennu	Narayanikutty	
1989	Jeevitham Oru Gaanam	Savithri	
1989	Pradeshika Varthakal	Elikutty	
1989	Naduvazhikal	Dr. Rachel George	
1989	Unnikrishnante Adyathe Christmas	Parvathiyamma	
1989	Season	TV buying lady	
1989	New Year	Ajith's mother	
1989	Utharam	Annie	
1989	Mazhavilkavadi	Bhairavi	

==== 1990s ====
Year	Title	Role	Notes
1990	Enquiry		
1990	Kashandikku Marunumarunnu		
1990	Rosa I Love You	Rosa's grandma	
1990	Paadatha Veenayum Paadum	Sarasamma	
1990	Urvashi	Agnez	
1990	Nammude Naadu	Water taking lady	
1990	Nanmaniranjavan Sreenivasan	Chandrika's mother	
1990	His Highness Abdullah	Madhavi Varma	
1990	Nagarangalil Chennu Raparkam	Martha	
1990	Ee Thanutha Veluppan Kalathu	Mrs. Davis	
1990	Maalayogam	Narayani	
1990	No.20 Madras Mail	Sunny's stepmother	
1990	Kuttettan	Hostel Warden	
1990	Thoovalsparsham	Unnithan's wife	
1990	Pavakkoothu	Malathy Ramachandran	
1990	Veena Meettiya Vilangukal	Sreenivasan's wife	
1990	Aye Auto	College Principal	
1990	Mukham	Usha's mother	
1991	Vashyam		
1991	Aadhya Rathrikku Mumpu		
1991	Raid		
1991	Koodikazhcha		
1991	Chuvanna Anki		
1991	Bali		
1991	Vasthuhara		
1991	Koumara Swapnangal	Santhosh's mother	
1991	Nagarathil Samsara Vishayam	Rajeswari	
1991	Sundhari Kakka	Alice	
1991	Orutharam Randutharam Moonnutharam	Lekha's mother	
1991	Kadinjool Kalyanam	Bhavani	
1991	Kuttapathram	Clara	
1991	Adayalam	Sarojini	
1991	Nayam Vyakthamakkunnu	College Principal	
1991	Cheppu Kilukkunna Changathi	Savithri	
1991	Oru Prathyeka Ariyippu	Maheswari	
1991	Nagarangalil Chennu Raparkam	House owner	
1991	Apoorvam Chilar	Dr. Saramma	
1992	Kavacham		
1992	Utsavamelam	Ammukuttiamma	
1992	Simhadhwani	Soudamini	
1992	Avarude Sankhetham	Suma's mother	
1992	Kauravar	Kunjaamina	
1992	Nakshthrakoodaram	Vishilakshi	
1992	Aavarampoo	Lakshmi	Tamil film
1992	Kamaladalam	Dance Teacher at Kerala Kala Mandiram	
1993	Kanyakumariyil Oru Kavitha		
1993	Agnishalabhangal		
1993	Meleparambil Anveedu		
1993	Ente Sreekuttikku	Nandhini's mother	
1993	Sainyam	Eashwar's aunt	
1994	Parinayam	Valiya Athemaru	
1994	Sagaram Sakshi	Nirmala's mother	
1995	Agnidevan	Ashram Head	
1995	Chaithanyam	Karthyayani	
1995	Kaattile Thadi Thevarude Ana	Venu's mother	
1995	Sakshyam	Oppol	
1995	Thacholi Varghese Chekavar	Subhadra	
1995	Mazhayethum Munpe	College Principal	
1995	Kokkarakko	Murali's mother	
1995	Sindoora Rekha	Ramani's mother	
1996	Kazhakam	Radha's mother	
1996	Dilliwala Rajakumaran	Maya's mother	
1996	Moonilonnu	Gopi's mother	
1996	Azhakiya Ravanan	Omanakuttyamma	
1996	Udhyanapalakan	Indu's grandmother	
1996	Sallapam	Leelavathi Thampuratti	
1997	Oru Mutham Manimutham		
1997	Guru	Ramanagan's mother	
1997	Niyogam	Saraswathiyamma	
1997	Asuravamsam	Sharada	
1997	Bhoopathi	Mahendra Varma's wife	
1998	Ennu Swantham Janakikutty	Akkara Muthassi	
1999	Angene Oru Avadhikkalathu	Balakrishnan's grandmother	
1999	Janani	Sr. Gorothy	
1999	Garshom	Aishu	
1999	Olympiyan Anthony Adam	Chakkummoottil Therutha	

==== 2000s ====
Year	Title	Role	Notes
2000	Pilots	Boby's grandmother	
2000	Gandharvaraathri	Unnimaya's grandmother	
2000	The Warrant		
2000	Kochu Kochu Santhoshangal	Ashalakshmi's grandmother	
2000	Vinayapoorvam Vidhyaadharan	Sushamma	
2000	Aanamuttathe Aangalamar	Devaki	
2000	Valliettan	Sivakumar's mother	
2001	Krishna Gopalakrishna	Gopalakrishnan's grandmother	
2001	Desam	Vijyakrishnan's grandmother	
2001	Chathurangam	Sr. Theresa	
2001	Snehithan	Malavika's aunt	
2003	Margam	Menon's aunt	
2003	Valathottu Thirinjal Nalamathe Veedu	Bhuveneswari Amma	
2004	Vellinakshatram	Muthassi (Valiya Thampuratti)	
2004	Perumazhakkalam	Paatti	
2004	The Journey	Ammachi	
2005	Makalkku	Gayathri	
2005	Udayon	Kunjujamma's mother	
2005	Ben Johnson	Gouri's achamma	
2005	Athbhutha Dweepu	Devamma	
2005	Chanthupottu	Sosamma	
2005	Achuvinte Amma	Kathreena	
2006	Rashtram	Kunjannamma	
2006	Avastha		
2007	Heart Beats	Hari's grandmother	
2007	Anchil Oral Arjunan	Arjunan's grandmother	
2008	College Kumaran	Sreekutti's grandmother	
2008	Swapnangalil Haisel Mary		
2008	Shakespeare M.A. Malayalam	Pavithran's grandmother	
2008	Swarnam	Aachupennu	
2009	Sufi Paranja Katha	Muthassi	
2009	Passenger	Sathyanathan's grandmother	
2009	Loudspeaker	Annie's grandmother	
2009	Pazhassi Raja	Kaitheri Thamburatty	

==== 2010s ====
Year	Title	Role	Notes
2010	Gulumaal: The Escape	Actress	
2010	Kutty Srank	Paru	
2010	Aagathan	Shreya's grandmother	
2010	T. D. Dasan Std. VI B	Dasan's grandmother	
2010	Karayilekku Oru Kadal Dooram	Anoop's grandmother	
2010	Thaskara Lahala	Annie Vincent	
2011	Kunjettan		
2011	Collector	Anish's grandmother	
2011	City Of God	Dasan's grandmother	
2011	Sankaranum Mohananum	Sankaran's grandmother	
2011	Sandwich	Sai's grandmother	
2011	Manushyamrugam	Old lady	
2011	The Filmstaar	Pankajakshi	
2011	The Train	Akku's grandmother	
2011	Kalabha Mazha	Muthassi	
2011	Veeraputhran	Middle Aged Woman	
2011	Kudumbasree Travels	Subhadramma	
2012	Ee Ammapooovu Oronappoovu	Amma	Short film
2012	Oru Kudumba Chithram	Paatti	
2012	Matinee	Savithri's grandmother	
2012	Outsider	Santha	
2012	Arike	Balu's mother	
2012	My Boss	Manu Varma's grandmother	
2013	Kalimannu	Paatti	
2013	Oru Yathrayil	Nabeesa	Segment:Amma
2013	For Sale	Nayarambalam Vasantha	
2013	Oru Indian Pranayakatha	Sidharth's grandmother	
2014	Ottamandhaaram		
2014	1983	Sunny's mother	
2014	Salaam Kashmier	Valyammachi	
2014	Onnum Mindathe	Sachithanandan's mother	
2014	My Life Partner	Mother Superior	
2014	Vegam	Annamma	
2014	Avatharam	Philomina	
2014	Villali Veeran	Old lady	
2014	Ithihasa	Janaki's grandmother	
2015	TP 51		
2015	Vellezhuthu		
2015	Malettam	Old lady	
2015	Kanneer Mazhayathu		Short film
2015	Uthara Chemmen	Muthiyamma	
2015	Haram	Isha's grandmother	
2015	Oru Second Class Yathra	Rosanna Thomas	Photo only
2015	Kasthoorba	Kunjachutha	
2015	Ben	Nun	
2015	Mayamaalika	Thampuratti	
2015	Appavum Veenjum	Margaret	
2015	Adi Kapyare Kootamani	Old Neighbour	
2016	Oru Dhalam		Short film
2016	Pachakkallam	Muthassi	
2016	Action Hero Biju	Benitta's relative	
2016	Aadupuliyattam	Black Magic Lady	
2016	Leela	Kumarakom Nalini	
2016	Marupadi	Suchamma	
2016	Paulettante Veedu	Orphanage inmate	
2017	Georgettan's Pooram		
2017	Matchbox	Ambu's grandmother, Ammu	
2017	Paathi	Muthassi	
2018	Aami	Muthasssi	
2018	Mahabalipuram		Short film
2018	Theetta Rappai	Ammini	
2018	Oru Kuprasidha Payyan	Hanna's grandmother	
2019	My Great Grandfather	Michael's grandmother	
2019	Sachin	Mariyamma	
2019	Mohabbathin Kunjabdulla	Abulla's mother	
2019	Muthassikkoru Muthu	Lakshmi Muthassi	
2019	Ottam	Ammachi	
2019	Safe	Eshwari Amma	
2019	Aakasha Ganga 2	Kausalya Antharjanam	
2019	Mamangam	Old Woman in Chandroth family	
2019	Thrissur Pooram	Krishnaveni's grandmother	

==== 2020s ====
Year	Title	Role	Notes
2020	Gauthamante Radham	Gauthaman's grandmother	
2020	Grandma Toy	Rugmini Thampuratti	Short film
2020	Sundari Muthi	Sundari Muthi	Short film
2020	Sufiyum Sujatayum	Sujata's grandmother	
2021	Tsunami	Grandmother	
2021	Keshu Ee Veedinte Nadhan	Keshu's mother	
2021	Panchali AD		
2022	Bhoothakalam	Vinu's grandmother	
2022	Kannadi		
2022	Paykkappal	Beevi's grandmother	

=== Other work ===
- Daivadashakam (2022; album)

== Voice only ==
- Thiruvambadi Thamban 2012 .... Grandmother of Thampan (voice for Sreelatha Namboothiri)
- Krishnankutty Pani Thudangi (2021) as Unnikannan's grandmother's voice
- Vidhi:The Verdict (2021) as Eliyamma (voice for Vijayakumari)

== Serials ==
•All works are in Malayalam language, unless otherwise noted.

List of Valsala's television credits
Year	Serial	Channel	Role	Notes
	Varnam			
1992	Ammavukku Kalyanam	DD	Dr. Basavamma	Tamil Serial
1995	Pennurimai	DD Malayalam		
1997–2000	Manasi	DD Malayalam		
2001	Marubhoomiyile Pookkalam	DD Malayalam	Mangalathamma	
2001–2002	Mangalyam	Asianet	Muthassi	
2002–2003	Valsalyam	Surya TV		
2003–2004	Swapnam	Asianet	Paatiyamma	
2004	Avicharitham	Asianet	Dr. Mallika	
2004	Jalam	DD Malayalam		
2004	Chitta	Surya TV		
2005	Swaram	Amrita TV		
2005	Sahadharmini	Asianet		
2005	Swantham Malootty	Kairali TV		
2006	Indumukhi Chandramathi	Surya TV	Annamma	
2006	Makalude Amma	Surya TV		
2006	Summer in America	Kairali TV		
2007	Naarmadi Pudava	DD		
2007	Ente Alphonsamma	Asianet		
2007	Ellam Mayajalam	DD Malayalam		
2007	Velankani Mathavu	Surya TV		
2007–2008	Amma Manassu	Asianet	Rahelamma	
2009	Aagneyam	DD		
2010	Ponnum Poovum	Amrita TV		
2011–2012	Swaamiye Saranamayappa	Surya TV	Devakiyamma	
2010–2011	Alaudinte Albuthavilakku	Asianet		
2011–2012	Ilamthennalpole	Surya TV	Meenakshi's Muthassi	
2012	Sreeparvathiyude Paadam	DD Malayalam		Telefilm
2012	Parinayam	Mazhavil Manorama	Ramabhadran's mother	
2012–2013	Mohakkadal	Surya TV	Chempakassery Mahalakshmi	
2013	Ullkadal	Kairali TV		
2013	Sreepadmanaabham	Amrita TV		
2013	Hello Robo	Surya TV		
2013–2018	Parasparam	Asianet	Krishnan's mother, Muthassi	
2013–2014	Bhagyadevatha	Mazhavil Manorama	Rahelamma	
2014	Bl. Mariam Thresia	Shalom TV	Ittayanam's grandmother	
2015	Vivahita	Mazhavil Manorama	Shalini's Ammayi	
2015	Mayamohini	Mazhavil Manorama	Mother of Yamini and Mohini	
2015	Sangamam	Surya TV		
2015	Snehasangamam	Surya TV		
2015	Chembaraththi	Surya TV		
2015–2016	Manasariyathe	Surya TV		
2015–2016	Meghasandesham	Kairali TV	Muthassi	
2016	Krishnathulasi	Mazhavil Manorama	Madhaviamma	
2016	Mizhi Randilum	Surya TV	Muthassi	
2016	Nonachiparu	Asianet	Katinkanni Madhavi	
2017	Chempattu	Asianet	Nangemma	
2018	Decemberinte Akasham	Amrita TV	Ammayi	
2018	Pranayini	Mazhavil Manorama	Kochuthresia	
2018	Priyankari	European TV Series	Valyammachi	
2018–2019	Gauri	Surya TV	Sanyasiniamma	
2018–2019	Thenum Vayambum	Surya TV	Pattiyamma	
2019–2021	Pookkalam Varavayi	Zee Keralam	Karthiyani	
2021	Priyankari	Flowers TV	Valyammachi	
2021	Ente Maathavu	Surya TV		
2022	Baani	YouTube	Muthassi	Webseries

== Other works ==
=== Drama ===
- Gopuram
- Gitopadesham

=== Advertisements ===
- Mahalakshmi Silks

=== Reality Show ===
- Nakshtradeepangal (Kairali TV)

=== Others TV shows ===
- Cinema One
- Charutha
- Matha Pitha Guru Daivam
