= Grihanathan =

- Directed by: Mohan Kupleri
- Story by: Mani Shornur
- Produced by: Neythalath Suchitra
- Starring: Mukesh; Sonia Agarwal
- Cinematography: Utpal V Nayanar
- Edited by: P.C Mohanan
- Music by: Rajamani
- Distributed by: Guru Poornima Films
- Release date: 18 May 2012
- Country: India
- Language: Malayalam

Grihanathan is a 2012 Malayalam family film directed by Mohan Kupleri, starring Mukesh and Sonia Agarwal (in her Malayalam debut) in the lead roles.

== Cast ==
- Mukesh as Vishvanathan/ GV
- Sonia Agarwal as Anitha
- Siddique as Alex
- Sudheesh as Sundara
- Jagathy Sreekumar as Reghuettan
- Suraj Venjaramoodu as Thampan
- Subi Suresh as Shanta
- Lakshmi Priya
- Jayakrishnan as Doctor Anil
- Ponnamma Babu
- Urmila Unni
- Naseer Puthiyandy as Hotel Manager
- Ambika Mohan as doctor
