= Njan Ekananu =

- Directed by: P. Chandrakumar
- Written by: Sudhakar Mangalodayam (Sudhakar P. Nair)
- Screenplay by: Sudhakar Mangalodayam (Sudhakar P. Nair)
- Produced by: Madhu
- Starring: Madhu; R. Dilip; Poornima Jayaram; Sukumari
- Cinematography: Jayanan Vincent
- Edited by: M. V. Natarajan
- Music by: M. G. Radhakrishnan
- Production company: Uma Arts
- Distributed by: Chalachitra
- Release date: 28 October 1982
- Country: India
- Language: Malayalam

Njan Ekananu is a 1982 Indian Malayalam-language film, directed by P. Chandrakumar and produced by Madhu. The film stars Madhu, R. Dilip, Poornima Jayaram and Sukumari in the lead roles. The film has musical score by M. G. Radhakrishnan.

== Cast ==
- Madhu as Madhavankutty Menon IPS
- R. Dilip as Dileep aka Dillan
- Poornima Jayaram as Sindhu
- Sukumari as Vasanthi
- Jagathy Sreekumar as Sreekumaran
- Sankaradi as Raman Nair alias Ramettan
- Janardhanan as Raghu
- Sreerekha as Uma
- Srividya as Dr. Seethalakshmi

== Synopsis ==
Madhavankutty Menon is a dedicated and workaholic IPS officer. He has four younger siblings- two sisters and two brothers. After the early death of their parents, Madhavankutty Menon had taken the responsibility to bring each one up. Each time Ramettan, the adjutant of the house, insists Madhavankutty to get married, he cites reasons to avoid it. He gets the elder sister (Vasanthi) married, the elder brother (Raghu) gets a job with the police, the next brother also gets settled and now Madhavankutty gets his youngest sister (Uma) married.

On resuming his job after the leaves (applied for his younger sisters marriage), Madhavankutty feels that it is time for a break and he opts for voluntary retirement and resigns. His siblings express concern about his decision, but Madhavankutty is unmoved. He plans for pilgrimage with Ramettan and sets out for a trip. They stay at a hotel where they happen to meet a young couple Dillan and Sindhu. Dillan is an orphan and is short-tempered. The couple spends their time enjoying the beach and often quarrel on silly matters. Sindhu falls ill and Dr. Seethalakshmi, who herself was spending vacation time in the hotel, comes to attend to her. Seethalakshmi reveals to Madhavankutty that her family had once sent a marriage proposal to Madhavankutty in his younger age, which he had then denied. After a quarrel, Dillan gets upset and leaves Sindhu and does not return for a few days. A disappointed Sindhu reveals to Madhavankutty that they are not yet married, and she had eloped with Dillan to escape from her stepmother's cruelty. Madhavankutty and Ramettan extend their stay in the hotel as they do not wish to leave Sindhu alone. They advise Sindhu to return home, which she denies. After losing hope for Dillan's return, they plan to return. Madhavankutty insists Sindhu to join them, and they take her home.

Madhavankutty's siblings visit him and they convey their indifference on Sindhu staying in his house. They quarrel with Madhavankutty and take leave. Sindhu falls ill again and Madhavankutty calls Dr. Seethalakshmi for consultation. Seethalakshmi suggests Madhavankutty to give Sindhu a life. The hotel room-boy cum waiter, Sreekumaran who had now become an ascetic seemed to pass by Madhavankutty's house along with his lady followers. Ramettan gets hold of him and was informed by Sreekumaran that Dillan had come back to the hotel searching for Sindhu, and based on the information he had received, Dillan had come to Madhavankutty's house to meet Sindhu. On reaching Madhavankutty's house, Dillan got the impression that Sindhu had married Madhavankutty and so leaves dejected. He spends his life grief-stricken and singing around the hotel. On hearing this, Ramettan gets tense, and he forces Sindhu to promise not to leave Madhavankutty if Dillan returns. Ramettan leaves the world the next day.

As Sindhu too emphasises on wedding, Madhavankutty finally agrees for the marriage. They go and stay in the same hotel, and plan to get married the next day at the nearby temple. Sindhu happens to hear Dillan singing and they meet. Dillan informs that, after he had left her in the hotel, he had been run over by a lorry, and was lying unconscious in a hospital for a few months. As he had known that its their marriage the next day, he wishes them a happy married life and was just about to take leave when Madhavankutty arrives at the scene. Madhavankutty proudly tells that he had never committed a mistake in his life knowingly or unknowingly. And now when he was about to commit a mistake knowingly, God himself has prevented him from doing so. He then takes the upper hand to get Dillan and Sindhu married and inherits them with all his wealth and property.

== Soundtrack ==
The music was composed by M. G. Radhakrishnan and the lyrics were written by Sathyan Anthikkad which was released on 1982.The song "O Mridule" was recreated by M. Jayachandran for the movie "Dolphins" which was sung by "Sudeep".

K. S. Chithra sang her first film songs through this movie.

No.	Song	Singers	Lyrics	Length (m:ss)
1	"O Mridule" (Sad)	K. J. Yesudas	Sathyan Anthikkad	
2	"O Mrudule"	K. J. Yesudas		
3	"Pranaya Vasantham"	K. J. Yesudas, K. S. Chithra	Sathyan Anthikkad	
4	"Rajani Parayu"	K. S. Chithra	Sathyan Anthikkad	
