= Chilambu =

1986 film by Bharathan

- poster
- Directed by: Bharathan
- Written by: N. T. Balachandran; Bharathan
- Produced by: Bless Movie Makers
- Starring: Rahman; Thilakan; Shobhana; Nedumudi Venu
- Cinematography: S. C. Padi
- Edited by: N. P. Suresh
- Music by: Ouseppachan
- Production company: Bless Movie Makers
- Distributed by: Seven Arts
- Release date: 9 May 1986
- Running time: 115 minutes
- Country: India
- Language: Malayalam

Chilampu is a 1986 Indian Malayalam-language film. Directed by Bharathan, the film is about a young man's revenge against his uncle who grabbed his family properties by expelling his mother and grandfather from the house. Rahman, Thilakan, Shobhana, Nedumudi Venu, Ashokan, Santhakumari, and Babu Antony appeared in leading roles. The script was written by Bharathan himself, based on a novel by N. T. Balachandran by the same title.

Martial arts has a vital role in the movie. The movie depicts "Kalarippayattu", the traditional martial art of Kerala, and also Karate. It is one of the rare and genuine martial arts movies in Malayalam and was a huge hit at the box office. Babu Antony made his debut in cinema by playing the main antagonist in this film. The music was composed by Ouseppachan and the lyrics were by Bharathan.

== Plot ==
Paramu, a young man, is living with his grandfather, mother, and sister who is mute. His family lost their property to his uncle who killed his father in the explosion of explosives set for a festival long back. His sister lost her normal life due to Shankunni, an assistant of Parmu's uncle, who tried to rape her during a festival which also happened long back when Paramu was a child. One day, on the request of his grandfather for the Chilambu (a special ornament of religious significance), Paramu sets off to the place of his ancestral home. The chilambu is now in the ancestral home where his uncle is enjoying their family properties. His childhood friend and fiancée, Ambika (daughter of his uncle), was waiting for Paramu's return. She is overjoyed seeing Paramu. The friendship and love rekindle between the two. On his return, Paramu makes his point clear that he has come for nothing but the chilambu. Nevertheless, his resolute and cruel uncle rejects him and threatens to kill him if he comes again with the same demand. Meanwhile, his childhood friends Ramu and Sahadevan also rekindle their friendship with Paramu. To them, Ramu tells why he has come there. When Paramu's intervention becomes unbearable, his uncle tries to sell off the chilambu to a foreigner and a Christian jewelry merchant. But after experiencing some traumatic supernatural incidents the night after he decided to sell the chilambu, he opts to abandon the idea. The Christian jewelry merchant also experiences similar supernatural incidents. Later, the uncle plans to appoint someone for his security since Paramu is a valiant martial arts expert. He calls his nephew, who knows Karate, for his security. One day, Ambika comes to Paramu and tells him that she will give him the chilambu if he comes to the ancestral home at night upon her signal. He agrees, and when they meet, Ambika tells him her wish that she wants to bear his child, thereby cleansing the brunt upon the ancestral home. Initially, he drops the idea but ultimately succumbs to her wish. Soon, she discovers Paramu is carrying martial weapons around his waist. Realizing how deep his wishes are about taking the chilambu back to his family, she tells him that she will show him where the chilambu is. She gives him a set of keys. When he tries to open the door of the room where the chilambu is kept, the light apparatus which was in Ambika's hand slips, and everyone comes to the scene. But Paramu somehow manages to take the chilambu with him. After that, a fight ensues between him and the people arranged by his uncle. In the fight, many of them, including the man who tried to rape his sister and others, get killed or injured. In the end, he rescues Ambika from her parents who try to detain her, and leaves the place victoriously with the chilambu and Ambika.

== Cast ==
- Rahman as Paramu
- Shobhana as Ambika
- Innocent as Inashu
- Thilakan as Appu Nair
- KPAC Lalitha as Kamala
- Nedumudi Venu as Sahadevan
- Ashokan as Ramu
- Babu Antony as Gopi, Appu Nair's nephew
- Bhagyalakshmi
- Kottarakkara Sreedharan Nair
- Master Vimal
- Santhakumari
- T. G. Ravi as Shankunni
- Rayiz as Appu Nair's son
- Meena as Appu Nair's second wife

== Reviews ==
The film tells how certain beliefs are so dear to some people and how, if someone tries to distort that belief either by force or by money, he gets a rebound. The Paramu's uncle, who tried to retain the chilambu with force, and the jewelry merchant and the foreigner, who tried to make the chilambu their own with money, fail miserably. In a way, the film tells how important beliefs are beyond modernism and scientific innovations. Yet whether Paramu could make a good life after possessing the chilambu (which asserts the truth value of belief systems) remains an unanswered question. Ambika successfully twists and makes use of the opportunity for a better life which is denied to her (she has a bad omen) because of similar belief systems. Her brother, who has turned from medicine to black magic, also remains a contradictory symbol of these belief systems and rituals.

== Soundtrack ==
The music was composed by Ouseppachan and the lyrics were written by Bharathan.

No.	Song	Singers	Lyrics	Length (m:ss)
1	"Pudamurikkalyanam"	K. S. Chithra	Bharathan	
2	"Thaarum Thalirum"	K. J. Yesudas, Lathika	Bharathan	
