= Kaathil Oru Kinnaram =

- Directed by: Mohan Kupleri
- Screenplay by: Govardhan
- Story by: Ambili (Director's daughter)
- Produced by: Sargams
- Starring: Jagadish; Jagathy Sreekumar; Prem Kumar; Thilakan; Kalpana
- Cinematography: Dinesh Babu
- Edited by: L. Bhoominathan
- Music by: S. P. Venkatesh
- Production company: Akshaya Productions
- Distributed by: Akshaya Productions
- Release date: 22 February 1996
- Country: India
- Language: Malayalam

Kaathil Oru Kinnaaram is a 1996 Indian Malayalam comedy film, directed by Mohan Kupleri and produced by Sargams. The film stars Jagadish, Jagathy Sreekumar, Prem Kumar, Thilakan and Kalpana in the lead roles. The film has musical score by S. P. Venkatesh.

== Plot ==
Hari and Varsha are in love but they cannot marry because her elder sister Megha is not willing to get married and also has some astrology issues. They find Mahesh, with similar issues to marry her, but Megha rejects him. Megha gets attacked by her ex-boyfriend Ajith and she reveals that she was cheated by him in the past. That is the reason why she didn't want to get married but now changes her mind. Megha's father rejects this proposal. Hari and his friends make various plans to solve these issue and this forms the rest of the movie.

== Cast ==
- Jagadish as Hariprasad/ Hari
- Jagathy Sreekumar as Karunakaran
- Prem Kumar as Mahesh
- Thilakan as Dr. Unnithan
- Harisree Ashokan as John Samuel
- Kalpana as Manikutty
- Indrans as Ramesh Menon/Rajappan
- Devayani as Megha Unnithan
- Chippy as Varsha Unnithan
- Sukumari as Dhakshayani
- Kollam Thulasi as Puthiyedath Padmanabhan Thambi
- Manju Pillai as Usha (Mahesh's sister)
- Madhupal as Ajith
- V. K. Sreeraman as Karim Bhai
- Shammi Thilakan as Lawrence
- Jose Pellissery as Dr. Unnithan's friend
- Kalabhavan Mani as Police Officer
- Gomathi Mahadevan as Damayanti

== Soundtrack ==
The music was composed by S. P. Venkatesh.

No.	Song	Singers	Lyrics	Length (m:ss)
1	"Mele Vinnile"	Chorus, Swarnalatha	Gireesh Puthenchery	
2	"Thakiladi Thaalavumaay"	Biju Narayanan	Gireesh Puthenchery	
