= Bhadrachitta =

- Directed by: Nazeer
- Produced by: Khaleel
- Starring: Geetha; Devan; Sukumaran; Thodupuzha Vasanthi; Roopa; Kavitha Thampi; Bahadoor; Prathapachandran; Valsala Menon; Nahas; Shankar
- Edited by: Nazeer
- Music by: Ouseppachan
- Release date: 6 October 1989
- Country: India
- Language: Malayalam

Bhadrachitta (transl. A Virtuous Mind) is a 1989 Indian Malayalam-language film directed by Nazeer and produced by Khaleel, starring Geetha, Sukumaran, Devan and Roopa The film also stars Shankar in a guest role.

== Cast ==
- Geetha as Bhadra
- Devan
- Sukumaran
- Thodupuzha Vasanthi
- Roopa as Chinnu's Mother
- Kavitha Thampi as Chinnu
- Bahadoor
- Prathapachandran
- Valsala Menon
- Nahas
- Shankar

== Trivia ==
Bhadrachitta was among the last releases of Shankar as he decided to leave film industry.

== Soundtrack ==
All songs are written by ONV Kurup.

- "Ridayathin" - KJ Yesudas
- "Poomukhathalathile" - KJ Yesudas
- "Aathmasugandham" - Lathika, chorus
