= Vasantha Sena (1985 film) =

- Poster
- Directed by: K. Vijayan
- Screenplay by: K. Basanth
- Story by: Sudhakar Mangalodayam
- Starring: Shankar; Seema; Shobana; Ratheesh
- Cinematography: C. E. Babu
- Edited by: K. Sankunni
- Music by: Shyam
- Production company: Victory Productions
- Distributed by: Hari Movies Release
- Release date: 10 November 1985
- Running time: 130 minutes
- Country: India
- Language: Malayalam

Vasantha Sena is a 1985 Indian Malayalam-language family drama film directed by K. Vijayan and written by K. Basanth from a story by Sudhakar Mangalodayam, starring Shankar, Seema, Shobana and Ratheesh, with Mohanlal in a guest appearance. It is the story of a woman's sacrifice to help many people.

== Plot ==
Mahesh is in love with Merlyn, who belongs to an Anglo-Indian family, but this relation is opposed by Shailaja Varma, his sister. Shailaja too had a love affair a long time back with Devan, who was killed by Shailaja's family. A conflict arises between Mahesh and Shailaja. Now Sidarth loves Shailaja and would like to marry her. Shailaja gets killed.

== Cast ==
- Shankar as Mahesh
- Seema as Shailaja Varma
- Shobana as Merlyn
- M. G. Soman as Sidarth Menon
- Ratheesh as Kishore
- Mohanlal as Devan (Guest appearance)
- Sukumari as Reetha
- Jagathy Sreekumar as Alfred
- Chithra as Nandini
- Innocent as Thirumeni
- Lalithasree as Victoria
- Santhosh as Mathews
- Thilakan as Unnithan

== Soundtrack ==
The music was composed by Shyam and the lyrics were written by Poovachal Khader.

No.	Song	Singers	Lyrics	Length (m:ss)
1	"Prayam Youvanam"	K. J. Yesudas, K. S. Chithra	Poovachal Khader	
2	"Priyanay Padum"	K. S. Chithra	Poovachal Khader	
3	"Sangeetham Laharithan"	Vani Jairam	Poovachal Khader	
