= Neeyethra Dhanya =

- Directed by: Jeassy
- Written by: K. K. Sudhakaran; John Paul (dialogues)
- Screenplay by: John Paul
- Based on: Oru Njayarazhchayude Oormaykk by K. K Sudhakaran
- Starring: Karthika; Murali; Menaka; Mukesh
- Cinematography: Anandakuttan
- Edited by: K. P. Hariharaputhran
- Music by: G. Devarajan
- Production company: Chithrakaumudi
- Distributed by: Chithrakaumudi
- Release date: 20 March 1987
- Country: India
- Language: Malayalam

Neeyethra Dhanya is a 1987 Indian Malayalam-language film, directed by Jeassy. The film stars Karthika, Murali, Menaka and Mukesh in the lead roles. The film has musical score by G. Devarajan. The film is based on a novel Oru Njayarazhchayude Ormaykk, by K. K. Sudhakaran. The film tells the story of a girl named Shyama, and the reasons behind her suicide and the reason behind it. The film is the debut of noted actress Divyaa Unni, who appears as a child artiste. The film ended up as a huge disaster in box office, but got noted up for its songs, especially the evergreen Arikil Neeyundayirunnenkil.

== Plot ==
The movie opens with Shyamala Panicker's death and her body being bought home. Amongst the mourning and the confusion regarding her suicide, every character remembers about Shyamala. First is Shyamala's Brother Suresh who fondly remembers her to be a bubbly and cheerful college girl. Her brother-in-law Prof. Sreenivasan remembers how she had mediated the fights between him and his wife / Shyamala's Sister Shobha and ended up uniting them. Sreenivasan also cannot fathom Shyamala's suicide since he found her to be a downright practical and bold person. Even Shyamala's Dad Captain Panicker is shattered at the turn of events, and he starts trying to find the reason for her daughter's suicide. He gets a shirt from her bag when he searches through her belongings. Suresh confirms the shirt to be belonging to their common friend Hafiz Ali. Suresh then questions Hafiz whether they were romantically involved, to which Hafiz replies in the negative, He reveals that he had proposed to her on occasions, but she has turned them down and they had agreed to remain as close friends. One day Panicker gets a call from her hostel warden to go there and collect Shyama's belongings. When he goes there, he meets Shyamala's friend and roommate Laila.

From Laila He learns of the close relationship between Hafiz Ali and Shyamala. After a brief period of fight, Shyamala invites Hafiz to a Kanyakumari trip. They hire a room to watch the sunrise where Shyamala tells him of their mother who had run away at some point in their life from their dad and left the kids also. Hafiz Ali also eventually opens to Shyamala about his personal life. It is shown earlier in the movie when Hafiz tells Shyamala about his father being a mental hospital inmate and been spending last two decades of his life there. That day he further tells her that after his mother's death he had remarried and gave all his properly to his second wife, Hafiz's stepmother. Eventually they start getting ill-treated by her family and his father loses his mental balance after some time. His stepmother finds a girl for Hafiz and conducts their marriage, but even his wife was unapathetic towards him and was controlled by his stepmother. Even after they are having a son and she continues the same attitude, he leaves the house and his family behind. After sharing a tender moment together, both Hafiz and Shyamala end up getting involved physically and she eventually gets pregnant. Totally devastated and at the advice of Laila, she goes back to Hafiz even if she had asked him earlier not to see her again. But she is shocked to see that his wife and son has come back (just as she wished him when they parted their ways after that night). Left with no other option, she commits suicide since she worried that even if she broke out the news to him, Hafiz would come for her deserting his wife and son. Panicker having learnt of the reason, leaves back to his place.

== Cast ==
- Karthika as Shyamala Panicker aka Shyama
  - Divya Unni as young Shyamala
- Murali as Hafiz Ali
- Menaka as Shobha Panicker
- Mukesh as Suresh Panicker
- Nahas as Prof Sreenivasan
- Lissy Priyadarsan as Laila John
- M. G. Soman as Captain Panicker
- Mala Aravindan as Esthappan
- Valsala Menon as Hostel Warden

== Soundtrack ==
The music was composed by G. Devarajan and the lyrics were written by O. N. V. Kurup. The album was released by Tharangini Records. The song Arikil nee is regarded by many as one of the greatest romantic hits in Malayalam. Yesudas himself had said that this is a song that gave him a lot of happiness after a long time.

No.	Song	Singers
1	"Arikil Nee Undaayirunnenkil"	K. J. Yesudas
2	"Bhoomiye Snehicha"	P. Madhuri
3	"Kunkumakkalppadavuthorum"	R. Usha
4	"Nishaagandhi Neeyethra Dhanya"	K. J. Yesudas
5	"Pularikal Sandhyakal"	K. J. Yesudas
