= Nagarathil Samsara Vishayam =

- VCD cover
- Directed by: Prashanth
- Screenplay by: Kaloor Dennis
- Story by: MohanRaj
- Produced by: Mumthaz Basheer
- Starring: Jagadish; Siddique; Chitra; Innocent; Kuthiravattam Pappu; Baiju; Keerikkadan Jose
- Cinematography: Prathapan
- Edited by: G. Venkitaraman
- Music by: Johnson
- Production company: Simple Productions
- Distributed by: Kirthi Films; Jubilee (in association with)
- Release date: 1991
- Running time: 110 minutes
- Country: India
- Language: Malayalam

Nagarathil Samsara Vishayam (Malayalam: നഗരത്തില്‍ സംസാര വിഷയം, English: The Talk of the Town) is a 1991 Malayalam comedy-thriller film written by Kaloor Dennis, directed by Prashanth. It stars Jagadish, Siddique, Chithra and Keerikkadan Jose in the lead roles. This is one of the low budget comedy films were produced following the success of In Harihar Nagar with Jagadish and Siddique in the lead role.

== Plot ==
Gopinatha Menon is an unemployed youth living off his family with aspirations of becoming a film star. He is in love with Saritha, his cousin, but the relationship is vehemently opposed by the families. He joins as his friend Samson's assistant in his job as a film representative in a struggling film distribution company, Akamsha Films run by Pappi and Krishnankutty

On their first trip to a rural cinema hall, they get hold of a box full of currency when their film roll box get swapped by accident. The pair decides to keep the fortune to themselves, but a gang of goons arrives looking for the lost money. They manage to escape stealing a scooter while the money is hidden in the bushes. They meet Susan, an old acquaintance of Samson who is working as a singer at the five star hotel the pair run into. With the help of Susan they manage to retrieve the sack of money, but it turns out to be swapped with the dead body of Pappi, projector operator at the cinema. The pair is dragged into another possible murder when Susan stabs the hotel manager who tries to rape her. Susan joins them on the run carrying Pappi's body as they steal another car from the hotel.

Vikraman, an underground hawala agent is still in the lookout for his box with 40 lakhs of hawala money. He engages his nephew, Sundaresan to lead the search operation.

== Cast ==
- Jagadish as Gopinatha Menon
- Siddique as Samson
- Chithra as Susan
- Baiju as Krishnankutty
- Keerikkadan Jose as Vikraman
- Zainuddin as Sundareshan
- Kuthiravattam Pappu as Pappi
- Jagannatha Varma as Achutha Menon
- Geetha Vijayan as Saritha
- Thodupuzha Vasanthi as Bharathi
- Innocent as Gap Swamy
- KPAC Sunny as Saritha's father
- Valsala Menon as Saritha's mother
- Unnimary as Subhashini
- Shivaji as Alex
- Viji Thampi as himself
- Suma Jayaram as herself
- Santhakumari
