= 3 Char Sau Bees =

- Directed by: Govindankutty
- Written by: Govindankutty
- Produced by: Vinod Nair; Jackson T.J
- Starring: Govindankutty; Dhanya Mary Varghese; Kalabhavan Mani; Hareesh Peradi; Jagathy Sreekumar
- Cinematography: Bejoyce Varghese
- Edited by: Don Max
- Music by: Jassie Gift
- Production company: Cinema Paradiso
- Release date: 20 August 2010
- Country: India
- Language: Malayalam

3 Char Sau Bees is a 2010 Malayalam-language film written and directed by Govindankutty, marking his debut as director and screenwriter. The film was released during Onam, an Indian harvest and cultural festival .

== Plot ==
Three college friends Selvan, Rahul and Zulfi commit in robberies to make money. However, their lives turn upside down when they find the corpse of a man in the house they were going to rob and get framed for the murder.

== Cast ==
- Govindankutty as Selvan / Selvaraghavan
- Rahul Menon as Rahul
- Anu Anandhan as Zulfi
- Kalabhavan Mani as Raghavan
- Dhanya Mary Varghese as Indu Menon
- Jagathy Sreekumar as Lock Kumaran
- Salim Kumar as Chandran Muthalaali
- Suraj Venjaramood as CI Sathyan
- Sukumari as Selvan's grandmother
- Hareesh Peradi as Baba
- Jaffar Idukki as Thankanchan
- Dharmajan Bolgatty as Suni mon
- Biju Kuttan as Palanichami
- Anoop Chandran as Gotharage Geevargheese
- Babu Jose as Chandran's son
- Kannan Pattambi as Varnapandiyan
- Pradeep Kottayam as Sales Man
- Dheepan as DYSP Jayalal
- Geetha Vijayan as Selvan's Mother (Photo Presence)
- Manka Mahesh as Indu's mother
- Gayathri as Servant
- Kottayam Purushan as Devassy
- Atlas Ramachandhran as Principal
- Major Ravi as Commando Officer (Cameo)
