= Adholokam =

- Directed by: Thevalakkara Chellappan
- Written by: Balu Kiriyath
- Produced by: Renji Mathew
- Starring: Jagathy Sreekumar; Nedumudi Venu; Parijat; Thiagarajan
- Music by: Raveendran
- Production company: Centenary Productions
- Distributed by: Centenary Productions
- Release date: 29 January 1988
- Country: India
- Language: Malayalam

Adholokam is a 1988 Indian Malayalam film, directed by Thevalakkara Chellappan. The film stars Jagathy Sreekumar, Nedumudi Venu, Parijat and Thiagarajan in the lead roles. The film has musical score by Raveendran.

== Cast ==
- Jagathy Sreekumar
- Nedumudi Venu as Peter
- Parijat
- Thiagarajan

== Soundtrack ==
The music was composed by Raveendran and the lyrics were written by Balu Kiriyath.

No.	Song	Singers	Lyrics	Length (m:ss)
1	"Aakashappookkal"	R. Usha	Balu Kiriyath	
2	"Aakashappookkal" (Pathos)	R. Usha	Balu Kiriyath	
3	"Annam Pookkula"	K. S. Chithra	Balu Kiriyath	
