= Nonachiparu =

- Genre: Drama; Comedy
- Directed by: Manoj
- Country of origin: India
- Original language: Malayalam
- No. of seasons: 1
- No. of episodes: 53

Production
- Producer: Anil Kumar
- Production location: Kerala

Original release
- Network: Asianet
- Release: 5 September – 18 November 2016

Nonachiparu (നൊണച്ചിപ്പാറു) is an Indian soap opera that launched on Asianet on 5 September 2016. Actress Sana Althaf plays the lead role in the series.

The show airs every Monday to Friday 10 PM IST. It replaced the popular game show Sell Me the Answer.

This series ended in 2 months – it was abruptly stopped and was replaced by the second part of the television series Vellanakalude Naadu on 21 November 2016.

== Plot ==
Parvathy has the knack of fooling anyone and make them believe her lies. This habit of lying had irrevocably destroyed her life and how she has to now face the consequences.

== Cast ==
- Sana Althaf as Parvathy a.k.a. Paaru
- Valsala Menon as Karinkanni Madhavi
- Master Munna as chottu
- Kottayam Rasheed as C.I.Chandrahasan Police officer
- Devi Chandana as Chandrika
- Amrita as Lakshmi
- Ambarish as Kannan
- Mithun as Hareendran
- Niranjana Bimal as Catherine
- Kannur Sreelatha as Hareendran's Mother
- Manka Mahesh
