= Govindankutty (actor) =

Actor in Indian cinema

Adoor Govindankutty
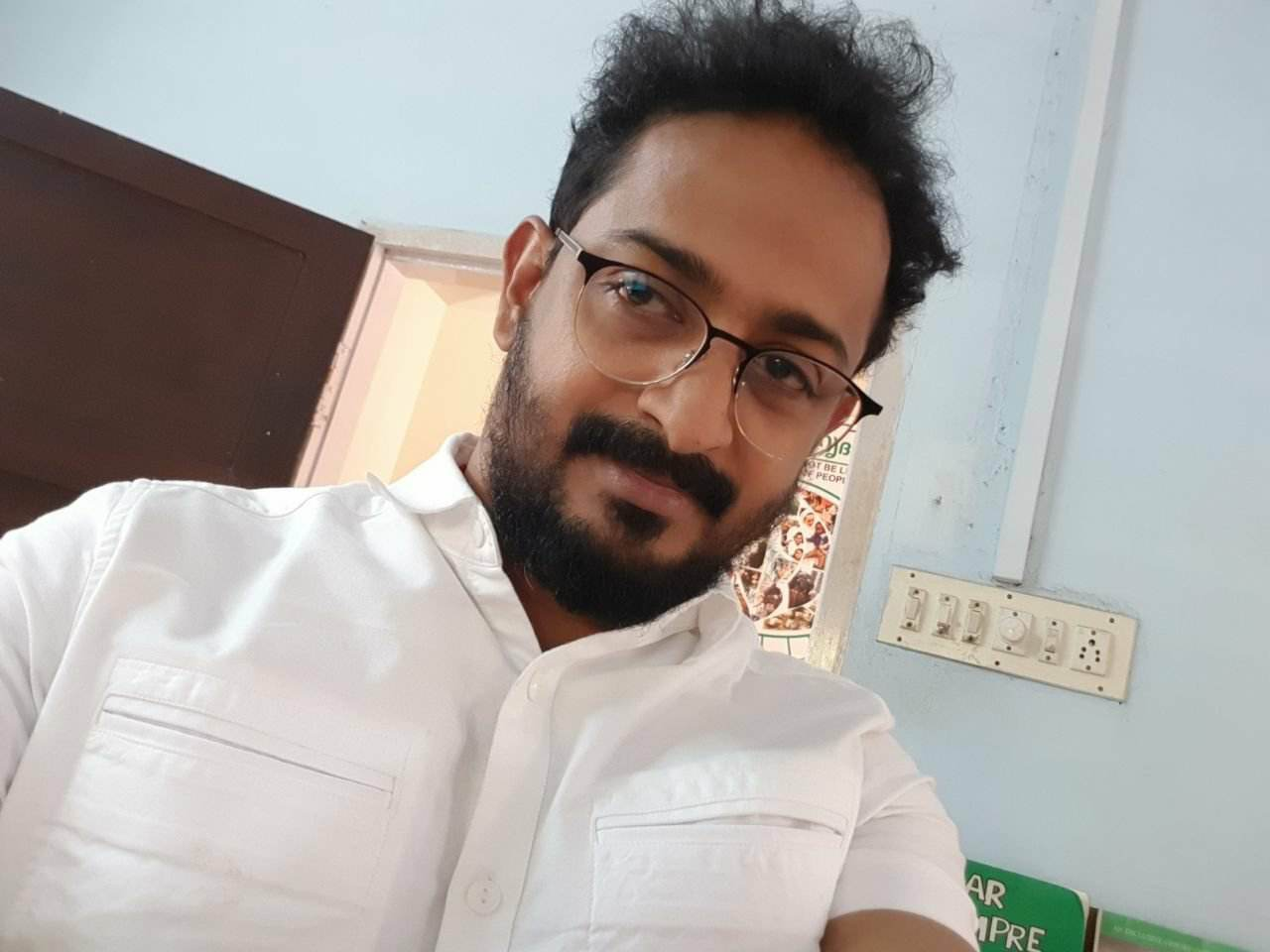
- Born: P. C. Govindankutty Nair; Adoor, Kerala
- Occupations: Film actor scriptwriter director anchor
- Years active: 2009–present

Adoor Govindankutty is an Indian television anchor, actor, scriptwriter, ad film and cine director, in Malayalam movies. He stepped into the media industry in 2001 through 'Students Only' chat show by Kairali TV. Govindankutty's first commercial movie was Anandabhadram, released in the year 2005.

== Television Anchor ==
As an anchor, Govindankutty was the main attraction of 'Students Only' campus show in Kairali TV since its inception, which was billed as the most popular campus-based programme on Malayalam television. He hosted more than 800 episodes of Students Only show spanned 8 years. He bagged the award from Fraternity for Arts and Media Entertainment (FRAME) in the year 2009 for best compere(Students Only on Kairali TV). Later he moved to New York City and done advanced studies at New York Film Academy and California In 2020, he made a comeback to television hosting a reality show Flowers student startup in association with Flowers (TV channel).

== Film career ==
In 2005, he debuted his acting career through the movie Anandabhadram. Later in 2010, he directed 3 Char Sau Bees which was his debut as a director and scriptwriter. Govindankutty played a major role in the movie Spirit directed by Ranjith in 2012.

== Filmography ==
Year	Film	Role	Ref.
2005	Anandabhadram	Sreeni	
2007	Heart Beats	Harikuttan Nair	
2008	Oneway Ticket		
2010	Nandhuni		
2010	3 Char Sau Bees	Selvan	Also Director
2012	Asuravithu		
2012	Spirit	Benoy	
2014	Pranayakatha	Seban	
2016	Shyam	Stephen	
