= Shyam (film) =

2018 film

- Theatrical release poster
- ശ്യാം
- Directed by: Sebastian Maliyekkal
- Story by: Sebastian Maliyekkal
- Produced by: Sebastian Maliyekkal
- Starring: Rahul Madhav; Bhagath Manuel; Vivek Gopan; Aparna Bajpai; Govindankutty
- Cinematography: Georgy Joseph
- Edited by: Jovin Jhon
- Music by: Ouseppachan
- Production company: Rajageetham Films Pvt. Ltd.
- Distributed by: Rajageetham Films
- Release date: 26 August 2016
- Running time: 110 minutes
- Language: Malayalam

Shyam (Black) is a 2016 Indian Malayalam-language drama family film directed and produced by debutant Sebastian Maliyekkal, under the banner of Rajageetham Films Pvt. Ltd. The film features Rahul Madhav, Bhagath Manuel, Vivek Gopan and Aparna Bajpai in the lead roles. It was released on 26 August 2016.

== Plot ==
The film, which revolves around friendship and love, tells the story of Shyam (Rahul Madhav), who lost his father when he was young, and develops a unique relationship with his mother, Rajamma (Sajitha Madathil) and mutual friends, who support him during difficult situations.

Shyam works as an accountant. He is liked and loved by others. Sebin (Bhagath Manuel) is a supervisor at a car company, Stephen (Govindankutty) works as a medical representative and Ramachandran (Vivek Gopan) is a sales executive. The incidents in the lives of these bachelors form the plot. The film portrays how one's childhood experiences influence the future and personality of others and the value of relations in one's life.

== Cast ==
- Rahul Madhav as Shyam
- Bhagath Manuel as Sebin
- Aparnaa Bajpai as Sinda
- Vivek Gopan as Ramachandran
- Govindankutty as Stephen
- Sajitha Madathil as Rajamma (Shyam's mother)
- Shaju Sasi
- Nazeer Sankranthi
- Radhika
- Faizal
- Sharvin Benedict as Shyam's brother

== Music ==
Ouseppachan composed the soundtrack album for the film and Sebastian Maliyekkal wrote the lyrics.

No.	Title	Singer(s)	Length
1.	"Chadikko Penne"	Jassie Gift, Rimi Tomy
2.	"Ko Ko Komalavalli"
3.	"Vidaraan Maranna Poove"	Vijay Yesudas
