= Nandini Oppol =

- VCD cover
- Directed by: Mohan Kupleri
- Screenplay by: Govardhan
- Based on: Nandini Oppol by Sudhakar Mangalodayam
- Produced by: Joe Mon
- Starring: Nedumudi Venu; Geetha; Siddique; Ganesh
- Cinematography: Ramachandra Babu
- Edited by: L. Bhoominathan
- Music by: Ouseppachan
- Production company: Sneha Movies
- Distributed by: Hellow Pictures
- Release date: 1994
- Country: India
- Language: Malayalam

Nandini Oppol is a 1994 Indian Malayalam-language film directed by Mohan Kupleri and produced by Joe Mon. The film is based on the novel of the same name by Sudhakar Mangalodayam and stars Nedumudi Venu, Geetha, Siddique and Ganesh. The film has musical score by Ouseppachan.

== Cast ==
- Nedumudi Venu as Balan; Nandini's husband, Ajayan, Anil and Sundari's brother
- Geetha as Nandini; Balan's wife
- Siddique as Ajayan
- Ganesh as Anil
- Geetha Vijayan as Latha, Ajayan's wife
- Sunitha as Maya, Anil's wife
- Saradha Preetha as Sundari
- Rajan P. Dev as Adhikari
- T. R. Omana as Amma; Balan, Sundari, Ajayan and Anil's mother
- Sudheesh as Murali, Sundari's love interest
- Kuthiravattom Pappu as Kunjunni Nair
- Philomina as Ammukutti Amma
- Oduvil Unnikrishnan as Maya's father
- Santhakumari as Maya's mother
- T. P. Madhavan as Latha's father
- Vijay Menon as Ramanathan
- Kunjandi as Govindan Mama
- Bahadoor as Hajiyar
- Kozhikode Narayanan Nair as Krishna Panicker
- Mala Aravindan as Balkan's colleague
- Bindu Panicker as Indhu; Nandini's sister

== Soundtrack ==
The songs are penned by O. N. V. Kurup and composed by Ouseppachan.

No.	Song	Singers	Lyrics	Length (m:ss)
1	"Innallo Poothirunal"	K. J. Yesudas	O. N. V. Kurup	04:32
2	"Innallo Poothirunal"	K. J. Yesudas, K. S. Chithra	O. N. V. Kurup	04:30
3	"Mylanji"	S. Janaki	O. N. V. Kurup	04:50
