= Unnikale Oru Kadha Parayam =

- Poster designed by P. N. Menon
- Directed by: Kamal
- Screenplay by: John Paul
- Story by: Kamal
- Produced by: Mohanlal; Century Kochumon
- Starring: Mohanlal; Thilakan; Karthika
- Cinematography: S. Kumar
- Edited by: K. Narayanan
- Music by: Ouseppachan
- Production company: Chears Films
- Distributed by: Century Release
- Release date: 3 July 1987
- Country: India
- Language: Malayalam

Unnikale Oru Kadha Parayam (transl. Kids, I'll tell a story) is a 1987 Indian Malayalam-language drama film directed by Kamal and written by John Paul from a story by Kamal. It was produced by Mohanlal and Century Kochumon through the company Chears Films, and stars Mohanlal and Karthika. The film features music composed by Ouseppachan. Unnikale Oru Kadha Parayam was a major commercial success at the box office. K. J. Yesudas won the National Film Award for Best Male Playback Singer.

== Plot ==
Eby is a young man taking care of a bunch of orphan kids, leading a nomadic life. His relationship with the children often resembles that of the good shepherd and his sheep. Eby, along with the children, rely on street magic performances as their means to survive. In one of their stays, they come across a church priest to whom Eby confesses their story.

Eby was kidnapped from his home as a young boy by a street performer who used to abuse him a lot. One night, Eby runs away from the man and is rescued by a rich and affluent Thomas Abraham, who becomes Eby's adoptive father. Thomas' sudden death again leaves Eby homeless and orphaned after Thomas' estranged wife and brothers return to reclaim Thomas' wealth and kicks him out of the home. During this time, Eby wanders in the streets with the little amount he has and comes across several street children who are abused or left orphaned. He empathizes with them and since then decides to protect and love them.

After hearing his story, the Priest offers help to Eby and advises him to send the children to school so that they gain education enabling them to come out of homelessness and poverty. With financial aid from the Priest, Eby sets up a farm and settles down in order to back up the associated expenses. A close relative of Ouseppachan, Annie Mol, who lost her parents in a plane crash, enters their life and falls in love with Eby.

For his father's death anniversary, Eby returns to town only to find that he is a terminal heart patient. Determined to spend the last days of his life with the children and Annie, Eby flees from the hospital. Feeling a responsibility towards the future of the children, he sends them to the Priest's orphanage (an idea which he initially disagreed to). Annie gets to know about Eby's illness and is devastated. Later that night, Eby gets a vision of the children running up to him calling his name. The next morning, the Priest, Annie and the children come to visit Eby only to find that he has died, which leaves them all in tears of sorrow.

== Cast ==
- Mohanlal as Eby
- Thilakan as The Priest
- Innocent as Ouseppachan
- M. G. Soman as Thomas Abraham
- Mamukkoya
- Janardhanan as Police Inspector
- Yadu Krishna as Yohannan
- Valsala Menon as Thomas Abraham's wife
- Karthika as Annie "Anniemol"
- Sukumari as Kunjannamma
- Chandraji as Street performer
- Viji Thampi as Police
- Rajan Padoor as Kunjappi

== Production ==
Kamal wanted his second film to star Mohanlal alongside child actors.

== Soundtrack ==
The film has songs composed by Ouseppachan, with lyrics by Bichu Thirumala.

| No. | Title | Artist(s) | Length |
|---|---|---|---|
| 1. | "Unnikale Oru Kadha Parayam" | K. J. Yesudas |
| 2. | "Vazhappoonkilikal" | K. J. Yesudas |
| 3. | "Unnikale Oru Kadha Parayam" (Pathos) | K. J. Yesudas |
| 4. | "Punchiriyude Poovilikalil" | K. J. Yesudas, Ambili |
| 5. | "Unnikale Oru Kadha Parayam" (Bit) | K. J. Yesudas |

== Reception ==
The film was a major commercial success at the box office.

== Awards ==
- 1988 National Film Award for Best Male Playback Singer - K. J. Yesudas
