= Ithile Iniyum Varu =

- Directed by: P. G. Viswambharan
- Starring: Mammootty; Mukesh; Dipika Chikhlia; Thilakan; Balan K. Nair
- Music by: Shyam
- Release date: 25 January 1986
- Country: India
- Language: Malayalam

Ithile Iniyum Varu is a 1986 Indian Malayalam-language film, directed by P. G. Viswambharan. The film stars Mammootty, Mukesh, Dipika Chikhlia and Thilakan in lead roles. The film had musical score by Shyam. It was a remake of 1984 Hindi film Mashaal. The movie was shot in different parts of Ernakulam City.

== Plot ==
Aravindan is a bold journalist keen on exposing the illegal activities on M. S. Nair. He is ousted from the newspaper he works for and decides to start his own paper. With the help of Kaimal, he starts an evening newspaper. He also succeeds in persuading Ramu, a wayward youth, to give up his bad habits. He sends Ramu for further studies in Chennai. Priya who works with Aravindan, develops a liking for Ramu.

In a bad turn of events, M. S. Nair destroys Aravindan's press, and gets him thrown out of his home. Aravindan's wife is sick, and dies on the way to the hospital, when several passersby, including M. S. Nair fail to stop for assistance. This enrages Aravindan, and he proclaims that his only target now is to amass money and gain power. With the help of Kaimal, Govindankutty Ashan and Rajesh, he starts a smuggling business. Soon he emerges as an underworld don.

Ramu comes back, and realizing that Aravindan is a new man, confronts Aravindan and questions his new ideals. He still likes and respects Aravindan. Rajesh is caught by M. S. Nair, and Aravindan gets to an aluminum factory where he is being held. In the resulting fight, M. S. Nair is killed by Aravindan. As the police arrives to arrest him, Aravindan says he will come back to fight injustice.

== Cast ==
- Mammootty as Aravindan
- Mukesh as Ramu
- Dipika Chikhlia as Priya Nair
- Thilakan as Kaimal
- Balan K. Nair as M. S. Nair
- Kundara Johny as Rajesh
- Kunchan as Lawrence
- N. Govindankutty as Chief editor Menon
- Kothuku Nanappan as Joseph
- Innocent as Dasappan
- Achankunju as Govindankutty Ashan
- Santhosh as Kasim
- Madhu Kapoor as Ambika
- Nahas
