= Paathi =

- Directed by: Chandran Narikode
- Produced by: Gopakumar Kunhiveettil
- Starring: Indrans
- Release date: 2017
- Country: India
- Language: Malayalam

Paathi is a 2017 Malayalam language horror drama film produced by Gopakumar Kunhiveettil. The film is directed by Chandran Narikode, and stars Indrans and Joy Mathew in the lead roles along with Sasi Kallinga, Kalabhavan Shajon, Seema G. Nair, Santhosh Keezhattoor and Bindu Krishna. The music is composed by Ramesh Narayanan. The film is based on a story written by Vijesh Viswom.

== Plot ==
The film portrays the struggles faced by Kammaran, a practitioner at a local health centre and a theyyam face painter. Abortions that have been taken place in the centre haunt him as his inner feelings question him for not allowing those children to live their life. He tries to get away from those feelings by concentrating on his artistic side of being an Theyyam face painter. He also suffers from an ugly scar on his face which makes him very depressed in life. The film also has Othenan in his Theyyam attire advising his devotees in spite of himself being a failure in leading a good family life.

== Cast ==
- Indrans as Kammaran
- Joy Mathew as Othenan
- Kalabhavan Shajohn as Kochu Moosa
- Sasi Kalinga as Muthoodan
- Santhosh Keezhattoor as Pavithran
- Valsala Menon as Muthassi
- Seema G. Nair as Radha
- Parvathi T as Kalyani
- Bindu Krishna as Ajitha
- Kanmani as Bushra
- C.V. Narayanan as Vasu
- Biju Chuzhali as Compounder

== Soundtracks ==
The music is composed by Ramesh Narayanan, and features singers Madhushree Narayan, Madhuvathi and Kavalam Sreekumar.

- "Cheri Thirinhu" – Kavalam Sreekumar
- "Mele"- Ramesh Narayan
- "Mizhineer" – Madhuvanthi Narayan
- "Teri Duniya"- Madhusree Narayan
