= Dilliwala Rajakumaran =

1996 Malayalam film directed by Rajasenan

Dillivala Rajakumaran
- Directed by: Rajasenan
- Written by: Rafi-Mecartin
- Produced by: Thomas Korah; Prem Prakash
- Starring: Jayaram; Manju Warrier; Biju Menon; Kalabhavan Mani
- Cinematography: Venugopal
- Edited by: K. P. Hariharaputhran
- Music by: Ouseppachan
- Production company: Anupama Cinema
- Release date: 6 September 1996
- Country: India
- Language: Malayalam

Dillivala Rajakumaran (Delhiite Prince) is a 1996 Malayalam film by Rajasenan starring Jayaram, Manju Warrier, Biju Menon, and Kalabhavan Mani. The movie tells a fictional story inspired by the Travancore Royal Family's famous Padiyettam ceremony (Royal adoption) which last happened in the year 1994 when Aswathi Thirunal Gowri Lakshmi Bayi of the Travancore Royal Family adopted Bharani Thirunal Lekha Parvathi Bayi.

== Plot ==
Appu and Maya are childhood sweethearts, and their parents have agreed to their marriage. Maya's father belongs to a branch of the local royal family. Appu is treated by Maya's father as his own son, and this makes her uncle jealous of him. However, Maya's life turns upside down when she is identified as the heir to her father's main royal family after her horoscope matches the qualities the royal family was looking for. The Maharaja proposes to adopt her as heir princess to continue the lineage. Greed and status make her father look for ways to get rid of Appu who might stand as an obstacle. Her uncle then makes her hate Appu for her to marry someone from the royal family. Meanwhile, Appu, with his best friend Mani, tries to win her back by disguising himself as Veerandra Varma, the nephew of the king whom no one has seen before. He introduces himself as the son of the king's estranged sister, Rani Padmini. In the meantime, the real Veerandra Varma arrives at the palace, on a mission to steal the royal crown. He is a spoiled brat and a famous rogue in Delhi which earned him the title of Dilliwala Rajakumaran.

Appu tries to convince Maya of his innocence, who is in preparation for adoption as a princess. However, it is prevented in many ways. Her uncle soon successfully unveils the real Veerandran's plot to steal the crown along with Appu (who was trying to avoid so) and both are imprisoned in a room until the royal ceremonies are over.

However, the family priest, under the instigation of the king's sister Padmini, helps both to escape and stops the Padiyettam ceremonies halfway. In front of everyone, Appu discloses his innocence and love towards Maya. The king, who is convinced of Appu's love, offers him a choice: whether he wishes to marry ordinary Maya or Princess Maya with no restrictions. The story ends with Maya completing the Padiyettam ceremony and sitting on the throne while Appu crowns her as his princess.

== Cast ==
- Jayaram as Appu / Veerendran
- Manju Warrier as Maya / Magam Thirunal Maya Thampuratti
- Biju Menon as Veerendran
- Kalabhavan Mani as Mani
- Narendra Prasad as Udhaya Varma Maharajavu
- Oduvil Unnikrishnan as Rama Varma
- K. T. S. Padannayil as Valyammaman
- Indrans as Parameswaran, servant in Udhayapuram palace
- Paravoor Ramachandran as Maya's uncle
- Srividya as Padmini
- Valsala Menon as Maya's mother
- Jose Pellissery as Krishna Murthy
- Nadirsha as Balan
- Poojappura Ravi as Janardanan
- Kochu Preman as Balan's father
- Sathyapriya as Maharani
- Chandni Shaju as Ammu
- Cherthala Lalitha as Appu's mother
- Kalabhavan Santhosh as Keshava Pillai
- Bindu Ramakrishnan
- Girija Preman
- Gayathri as Amburi
- Kavitha Lakshmi

== Soundtrack ==
The film's soundtrack contains six songs composed by Ouseppachan and lyrics written by S. Ramesan Nair.

#	Title	Singer(s)
1	"Akale Nizhalay Aliyum Kiliye"	Biju Narayanan, Arundhati
2	"Kalahapriye Nin Mizhikalil"	K. S. Chitra, P. Unnikrishnan
3	"Nilaathinkal Chiri Maayum (F)"	K. S. Chitra
4	"Nilaathinkal Chiri Maayum (M)"	Biju Narayanan
5	"Poovarashin Kuda Nivarthi"	K. S. Chitra
6	"Pranavathin Swaroopamaam"	Arundhati, Lekha K. Nair, Sindhu
