= Athinumappuram =

1987 film

- Directed by: Thevalakkara Chellappan
- Written by: A. R. Mukesh; Kaloor Dennis (dialogues)
- Screenplay by: Kaloor Dennis
- Starring: Mammootty; Geetha; Jagathy Sreekumar; Mukesh; Shari
- Cinematography: Anandakuttan
- Edited by: V. P. Krishnan
- Music by: Johnson
- Production company: Vijaya Film Circuit
- Distributed by: Vijaya Film Circuit
- Release date: 8 May 1987
- Country: India
- Language: Malayalam

Athinumappuram is a 1987 Indian Malayalam-language film, directed by Thevalakkara Chellappan. The film stars Mammootty, Geetha, Jagathy Sreekumar, Mukesh and Adoor Bhavani. The film has musical score by Johnson.

== Cast ==
- Mammootty
- Geetha
- Jagathy Sreekumar
- Mukesh
- Adoor Bhavani
- Shari
- Jagannatha Varma
- Mamukkoya
- Valsala Menon

== Soundtrack ==
The music was composed by Johnson and the lyrics were written by Poovachal Khader.

No.	Song	Singers	Lyrics	Length (m:ss)
1	"Kalyaana Roopanaakum"	K. S. Chithra	Poovachal Khader	4:10
2	"Madhumaasam Manninte"	K. S. Chithra, P. Jayachandran	Poovachal Khader	3:46
