= Pranayakadha =

- Theatrical release poster
- Directed by: Aadhi Balakrishnan
- Written by: Aadhi Balakrishnan
- Screenplay by: Aadhi Balakrishnan
- Story by: Aadhi Balakrishnan
- Produced by: Firoz Pandarakkattil
- Starring: Arun V. Narayan; Swarna Thomas; Govindankutty
- Cinematography: Murali Krishnan
- Edited by: Vijay Shankar
- Music by: Alphons Joseph
- Production company: Shehnaz Movie Creations
- Release date: 18 January 2014
- Running time: 138 minutes
- Country: India
- Language: Malayalam

Pranayakadha is a 2014 Malayalam romance-drama film written and directed by Aadhi Balakrishnan. Starring actors Arun V. Narayan and Swarna Thomas in the lead roles, the film was released on 17 January 2014.

== Cast & Crew ==
- Arun V. Narayan
- Swarna Thomas
- Balachandran Chullikkadu
- Firos P.S.
- Govindankutty Adoor
- Jayaprakash Kuloor
- Joy Mathew
- Thara Kalyan
- Urmila Unni

== Music ==
Pranayakadha

Soundtrack album by Alphons Joseph
- Released: 2 December 2013
- Genre: Feature film soundtrack
- Length: 7:02
- Label: Muzik 247

Alphons Joseph chronology
The Hitlist (2012)	Pranayakadha (2013)	@ Andheri (2014)

The soundtrack album of the film has been composed by Alphons Joseph, while lyrics have been penned by Murukan Kattakada and Rafeeq Ahammed. On 25 June 2013, the making of the song "Manjil Mungippongum" was leaked on the net by Metromatinee.com.

=== Track listing ===
All lyrics are written by Rafeeq Ahammed and Murukan Kattakada; all music is composed by Alphons Joseph.

Pranayakadha
No.	Title	Lyrics	Singer(s)	Length
1.	"Manjil Mungippongum"	Rafeeq Ahammed	Shreya Ghoshal	3:34
2.	"Doore Puthiyoru Theeram"	Murukan Kattakada	Alphons Joseph	3:28
Total length:				7:02
