= Mohan Kupleri =

Indian film director

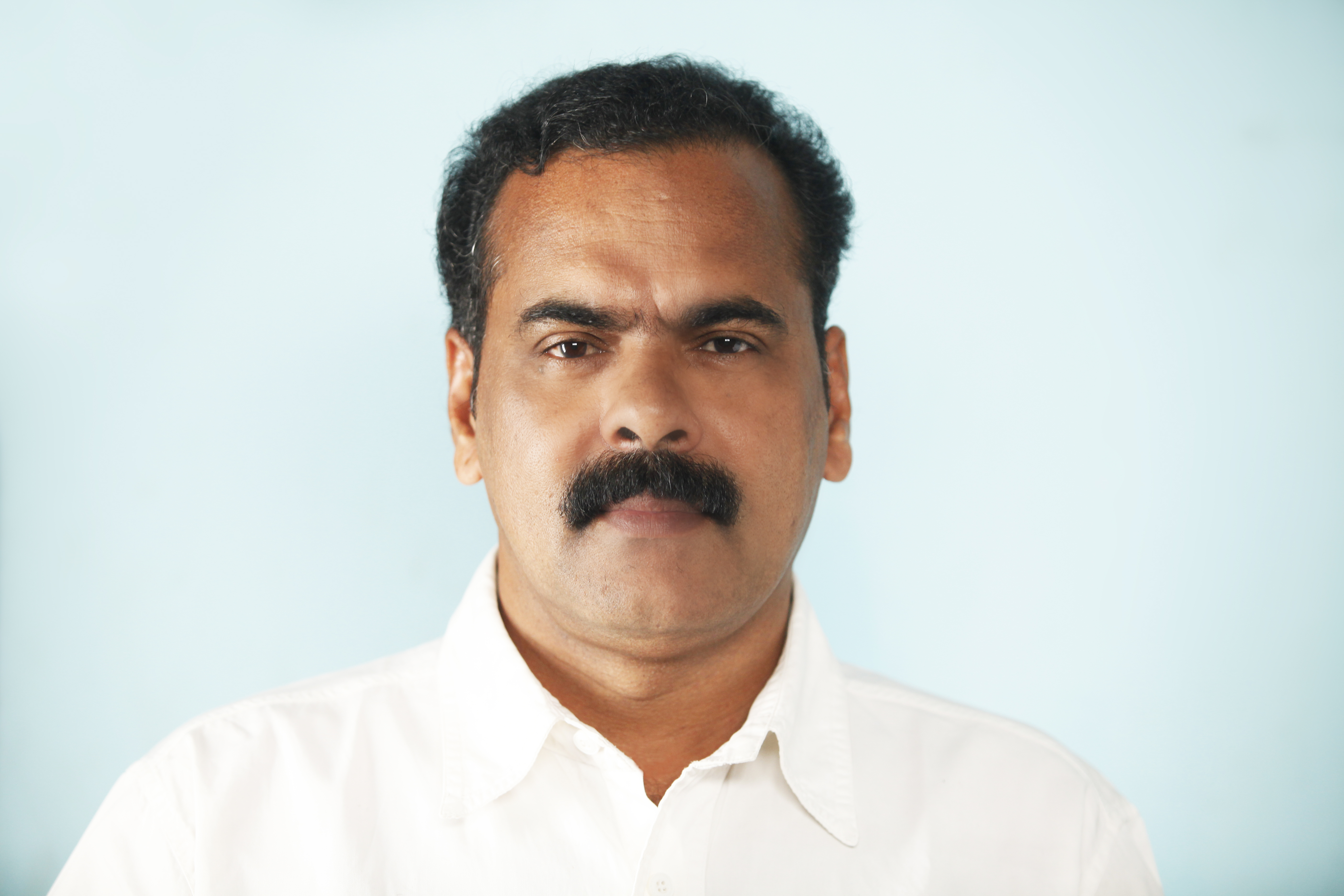
- Born: 19 June 1957 (age 69); Payyanur, Kannur, Kerala, India
- Occupation: Film director
- Years active: 1981–present
- Spouse: Rajasree Mohan
- Children: Dr. Ambili SaiKiran, Akhil Mohan

Mohan Kupleri (born 19 June 1957) is an Indian film director in Malayalam cinema, Television Serials and Advertising Films. He made his debut cinema with Grihaprevesam (1992). His films include Nandini Oppol (1994), Kaathil Oru Kinnaram (1996), Dravidan (1998), Kattathoru Penpoovu (1998), Saavithriyude Aranjaanam (2002), Payum Puli (2007), Evadaina Sare (Telugu language) (2007), Grihanathan (2012) and Chandragiri (2018).

== Biography ==
Mohan Kupleri hails from Payyanur, Kannur District, in the state of Kerala. He is currently residing in Thiruvananthapuram. He is married to Rajasree, and they have two children: Dr. Ambili Saikiran and Akhil Mohan. Dr. Ambili is married to Saikiran, and Akhil is married to Vrinda.

Mohan Kupleri's entry into the film industry began with his work as an assistant director to the acclaimed director Adoor Gopalakrishnan. He collaborated with Adoor Gopalakrishnan on several award-winning films, including Elippathayam, Mukhamukham, and Anantaram, which garnered numerous national and international accolades.

In addition to his work in cinema, Mohan Kupleri has scripted and directed television serials and commercial advertising films. His directorial credits include several popular Malayalam television serials. Some of his notable serials are Swaram which won the Television Critics' Award for best serial in 2006 (Amrita TV), 'Kattukurangu'- Kerala Film Critics Award for Best Director, Kerala State Television Award for best 2nd serial, Swantham (Asianet), Dhannyam (Asianet), Charulatha (Surya TV), Indulekha (Surya TV), M.T Kathakal (Amrita TV), Kattukurangu (Amrita TV), Kallyanasougandhikam (Asianet), Athmasakhi (Mazhavil Manorama) etc.

== Filmography ==
=== As director ===
Films	Year	Story	Actors	Lyrics	Music director	Notes
Grihaprevesam	1992	Mani Shornnur	Jagadish, Rekha, Sai Kumar, Siddique	O. N. V. Kurup	S. Balakrishnan	Debut Film
Nandini Oppol	1994	Sudhakar Mangalodayam	Nedumudi Venu, Siddique, Sunitha	O. N. V. Kurup	S. P. Venkatesh	
Kaathil Oru Kinnaram	1996	Govardhan	Jagadish, Prem Kumar, Chippy, Devayani	O. N. V. Kurup	S.P Venkitesh	Story thread by Ambili; daughter of Mohan Kupleri
Kattathoru Penpoovu	1998	C. V. Balakrishnan	Murali, Thilakan, Kavya Madhavan, Sangita	Kaithapram Damodaran Namboothiri	Kaithapram	Thilakan got State Award for Second Best Actor
Dravidan	1998	Jossy Vagamattom	Vijayaraghavan, Vani Viswanath, Rajan P Dev	Kaithapram Damodaran Namboothiri	S. P. Venkatesh	
Saavithriyude Aranjaanam	2002	M. Mukundan	Innocent, Harisree Ashokan, Kalabhavan Mani, Aswathy	Gireesh Puthenchery	M. Jayachandran	Cinema version of M. Mukundan's literary work.
Payum Puli	2007	Biju Devassy	Kalabhavan Mani, Sai Kumar, Siddique, Chandra Lakshman	Gireesh Puthenchery	Mohan Sithara	
Evadaina Sare (Telugu)	2007	Biju Devassy	Rambha, Chandra Lakshman		Mohan Sithara	Telugu Movie
Grihanathan	2012	Mani Shornur	Mukesh, Sonia Agarwal, Siddique	Vayalar Sharath	Achu Rajamani	Sonia Agarwal's debut Malayalam movie
Chandragiri	2018	Vinod Kumar Kuttamath	Lal, Shaun Romy, Joy Mathew, Sunil Sukhada, Sajitha Madathil	Vayalar Sharath	Bijibal, Sreevalsan J. Menon	The story of a School and Yakshagana

=== As Unit or Asst. Director ===
Film	Year	Director	Actors	Language
Elippathayam	1981	Adoor Gopalakrishnan	Karamana Janardanan Nair, Sharada, Jalaja	Malayalam
Mukhamukham	1984	Adoor Gopalakrishnan	Karamana Janardanan Nair, Ashokan, Kaviyoor Ponnamma	Malayalam
Anantaram	1987	Adoor Gopalakrishnan	Mammootty, Ashokan, Shobhana	Malayalam
Basheer the man	1987	MA Rahman	Documentary on Vaikom Muhammad Basheer	Malayalam
Ashokante Aswathikuttikku	1989	Vijayan Karote	Ashokan, Parvathy Jayaram, Thilakan, Innocent	Malayalam

== Television ==
Serial	Channel	Notes
Ladies Hostel	Doordarshan	
Swantham	Asianet	
Dhannyam	Asianet	
Charulatha	Surya TV	
Indulekha	Surya TV	
M.T Kathakal	Amrita TV	
Kattukurangu	Amrita TV	
koodum Thedi	Asianet	
Kalyanasougandhikam	Asianet	
Athmasakhi	Mazhavil Manorama	
Priyapettaval	Mazhavil manorama	
Kaiyethum Doorath (TV series)	Zee Keralam	
Shyamambaram	Zee Keralam	2023-24
Ishtam Mathram	Asianet	2024-26
