= Thevalakkara Chellappan =

Indian screenwriter and director

Chellappan (Prashanth)
- Chellappan
- Born: Kollam, Kerala, India
- Died: 29 June 2015; Bharanikkavu, Sasthamcotta, Kerala, India
- Resting place: Bharanikkavu
- Other names: Thevalakkara Chellappan; Prashanth
- Occupations: Director; Writer
- Spouse: Geetha

Chellappan was an Indian screenwriter and director who was active in Malayalam cinema until the mid-1990s. He made films with Mammootty.

== Personal life ==
He studied at Pandhalam Poly Technique. He was married to Geetha. They had two children, Prathiba and Anandu.

== Filmography ==
A complete list of his films are available from the Malayalam Movie Database

Year	Date	Film	Language	Starring	Other notes
1986		Aalorungi Arangorungi	Malayalam	Mammootty, Shobhana, Menaka Sureshkumar	
1987	8 May	Athinumappuram	Malayalam	Mammootty, Geetha	
1988		Adholokam	Malayalam	Thyagarajan, Ranjini, Jagathy Sreekumar	
1988		Arjun Dennis (Vice Chancellor)	Malayalam	Thyagarajan, Ashokan, Nirosha	
1989		Miss Pameela	Malayalam	Thyagarajan, Suresh Gopi, Silk Smitha	
1991		Nagarathil Samsara Vishayam	Malayalam	Jagadeesh, Siddhique	
1992		Kallan Kappalil Thanne	Malayalam	Jagadeesh, Siddhique	
