= Heart Beats (film) =

- DVD cover
- Directed by: Vinu Anand
- Written by: Babu Janardanan
- Starring: Indrajith Sukumaran; Simran; Manikuttan; Govindankutty; Anoop Chandran
- Cinematography: Jibu Jacob
- Edited by: Ranjan Abraham
- Music by: George Peter
- Release date: 4 August 2007
- Running time: 116 minutes
- Country: India
- Language: Malayalam

Heart Beats is a 2007 Indian Malayalam-language romantic film starring Indrajith Sukumaran and Simran.

== Cast ==
- Indrajith Sukumaran as Binoy Idikkula
- Simran as Thangam George
- Biju Menon as Basheer Ahmed
- Manikuttan as Isaac
- Govindankutty as Harikuttan Nair
- Anoop Chandran as Balan
- Venu Nagavally as Prof Abraham Koshi
- Cochin Haneefa as Plaparambil Isaac
- Arundhathi B as Haritha
- Urmila Unni as Nancy, Binoy's mother
- Jagathy Sreekumar as Principal Dr. Jacob Isaac
- Arun Narayanan
- Vijayakumari as Therutha Chedathi
- Tini Tom as Sub Inspector Vijayan
- T. P. Madhavan as Sreedharan Nair
- Sudheer Sukumaran as Sajin
- E. A. Rajendan as Gopi
- Bindu Ramakrishnan as Hari's mother
- Valsala Menon as Hari's Grandmother
- Soorya J Menon as Idikkula’s lover
- Manasa in a special appearance

== Production ==
Simran reportedly okayed the film team after they reduced the size of her role. Indrajith Sukumaran plays a rich spoilt brat while Simran plays a mystery woman. Simran said that the film is not a typical campus story.

== Soundtrack ==
The film's soundtrack contains 5 songs, all composed by George Peter and Lyrics by Gireesh Puthenchery.

#	Title	Singer(s)
1	"Hey Mizhi Mazha (D)"	Naresh Iyer, Sunitha Sarathy
2	"Hey Mizhi Mazha [F]"	Sunitha Sarathy
3	"Nadiye"	Vidhu Prathap, George Peter, Sruthi, Swapna
4	"Om Giridhaari"	Karthik, Kalyani Menon
5	"Va Kozhi"	George Peter, Jassie Gift, Kalyani Menon, Pradeep Palluruthy, Sarina, Sruthi

== Reception ==
A critic from Sify wrote that "The trouble with the film is that it does not have a structured storyline and has continuity lags". A critic from webindia123 wrote that "Ultimately, Heartbeats ends up as just another wannabe Classmates".
