= Aavanikunnile Kinnaripookkal =

- Directed by: Paul Babu
- Starring: Kakka Ravi; Karthika
- Release date: 1991
- Country: India
- Language: Malayalam

Aavanikunnile Kinnaripookkal is a 1991 Indian Malayalam film, directed by Paul Babu, starring Kakka Ravi and Karthika in the lead roles (in her last film before retiring from the movie industry).

== Plot ==
Dr. Rajalakshmi is still grieving the son she lost 25 years ago. She is living with her niece, Indu. Rajalakshmi meets Raju, a medical representative. Indu also meets Raju and they fall for each other. Though Raju claims his parents are living in Philadelphia, in the subsequent scenes, it is revealed that he is an orphan and was raised in a Christian orphanage.

Balan Menon is a relative of Rajalakshmi and has feelings for her since their youth. Rajalakshmi frequently tries to avoid Balan Menon's proposals to start a fresh life together.

Raju requests Rajalakshmi for Indu's hand in marriage. Rajalakshmi refuses this since Raju is an orphan. Balan Menon tries to convince Rajalakshmi but fails. Raju and Indu decide to part their way for the sake of Rajalakshmi. Rajalakshmi goes to the orphanage and realizes that Raju is her own son.

The film ends in tragedy with Raju dying in a bike accident on the way to meet Rajalakshmi.

== Cast ==
- Kakka Ravi as Raju
- K. R. Vijaya as Rajalakshmi
- Karthika as Indu
- Nedumudi Venu as Balan Menon
- Ashokan as Ajayan (Aji)
- Babu Namboothiri as Father
- Jagathy Sreekumar as Stephan Thomas
- Innocent as Idiyan Kesava Pillai
- T. P. Madhavan as Lonappan

== Soundtrack ==
All songs written by ONV Kurup.

- "Erinjadangi" – KJ Yesudas
- "Janmangal Than" – KJ Yesudas, KS Chithra
- "Kuliru Peyyunna" – KJ Yesudas, KS Chithra
- "Shaanthayaam Shyamayaam" – KJ Yesudas
- "Snehathe Vaazhthi" – KJ Yesudas
