= Sundhari Kakka =

- Directed by: Mahesh Soman
- Produced by: V. Varghese
- Starring: Sukumari; Innocent; Suresh Gopi; Manoj K. Jayan
- Music by: Score: Ouseppachan; Songs: Johnson
- Production company: Soorya Creations
- Distributed by: Soorya Creations
- Release date: 1991
- Country: India
- Language: Malayalam

Sundhari Kakka is a 1991 Indian Malayalam film, directed by Mahesh Soman and produced by V. Varghese. The film stars Sukumari, Innocent, Suresh Gopi and Manoj K. Jayan in the lead roles. The film has musical score by Ouseppachan and songs by Johnson.

== Plot ==
Trouble erupts when a group of young men try to seduce a famous model, but a gang leader also lusts for her.

== Cast ==
- Rekha as Princy John
- Rizabawa as Fa. Samuel Padamadan
- Jagadish as Thomson
- Prem Kumar as Johnson
- Siddique as Nixon
- Suresh Gopi as Peter Joseph
- K. B. Ganesh Kumar as Roy Philip
- Sukumari as Rosy
- K. P. A. C. Lalitha as Eliyamma
- Philomina as Mariya
- Karamana Janardanan Nair as Ouseppu Palamettathu
- Innocent as Paily
- K.P.A.C. Sunny as John Ousep Palamettathu
- Thodupuzha Vasanthi as Mary John
- Mamukkoya as Sulaiman
- Kollam Thulasi as Joseph
- Valsala Menon as Alice Joseph
- Zainuddin – Cameo Appearance
- Suvarna Mathew – Cameo Appearance
- M. S. Thripunithura – Cameo Appearance
- Manoj K. Jayan – Gangster

== Soundtrack ==
The music was composed by Johnson and the lyrics were written by Kaithapram and Pradeep Ashtamichira.

No.	Song	Singers	Lyrics	Length (m:ss)
1	"Ezhaamswargam"	M. G. Sreekumar	Kaithapram, Pradeep Ashtamichira	4:53
2	"Neelaambal"	M. G. Sreekumar	Kaithapram, Pradeep Ashtamichira	4:49
3	"Oru Janmamaam Ushasandhyayaay"	K. S. Chithra	Kaithapram, Pradeep Ashtamichira	6:08
