= Adiverukal =

1986 film by S. Anil Kumar

- Promotional poster designed by P. N. Menon
- Directed by: S. Anil Kumar
- Screenplay by: T. Damodaran
- Story by: Peruvanthanam Sukumaran
- Produced by: Mohanlal; Century Kochumon
- Starring: Mohanlal; Karthika; Suresh Gopi; Mukesh
- Cinematography: Jayanan Vincent
- Edited by: K. Narayanan
- Music by: Shyam
- Production company: Cheers Films
- Distributed by: Century Release
- Release date: 5 December 1986
- Country: India
- Language: Malayalam

Adiverukal (transl. Deep roots) is a 1986 Indian (Malayalam) social-problem film directed by S. Anil Kumar (in his directorial debut) and written by T. Damodaran from a story by Peruvanthanam Sukumaran. It was produced by Mohanlal and Century Kochumon under the company Cheers Films. The film stars Mohanlal, Karthika, Sukumari and Jagathy Sreekumar. The film has musical score and songs composed by Shyam.

== Plot ==
This is a film about fighting against exploitation of forest through poaching animals, illegally logging trees, cultivating cannabis, etc.

== Cast ==
- Mohanlal as Balakrishnan
- Karthika as Sreedevi
- Sukumari as Saraswathi Amma
- Jagathy Sreekumar as Koshy Cheriyan
- Suresh Gopi as Jayachandran
- Mukesh as Ranger Sajan Varghese
- Thilakan as Raghava Panicker
- Nedumudi Venu
- Rohini as Annakutti
- Augustine as Sathyan, Manager
- Babu Namboothiri as Josephkutty
- Jagannatha Varma as Unnithan
- Kundara Johnny as Kootuvadi Vasu
- Kunjandi as Mooppan
- Kuthiravattam Pappu as Kelu Nair
- CI Paul as Forest Conservator Vishwanathan
- Priya as Selvi
- Bastian Vinayachandran as Vinayan
- Vijayan Peringodu as M.L.A Kuriakose
- Thodupuzha Vasanthi as Thresia

== Production ==
Adiverukal was the directorial debut of S. Anil Kumar, who was the associate director of I. V. Sasi. The ecotourism area Thenmala in Kollam district was the filming location. The elephant used in the film was brought from Thrissur. Mohanlal escaped from the elephant attack several times while filming.

== Soundtrack ==
The music was composed by Shyam and the lyrics were written by Bichu Thirumala.

No.	Song	Singers	Lyrics
1	"Maamazhakkaade"	K. S. Chithra	Bichu Thirumala
2	"Thenaari Thenkaashi"	K. S. Chithra, Chorus, Krishnachandran	Bichu Thirumala

== Gallery ==
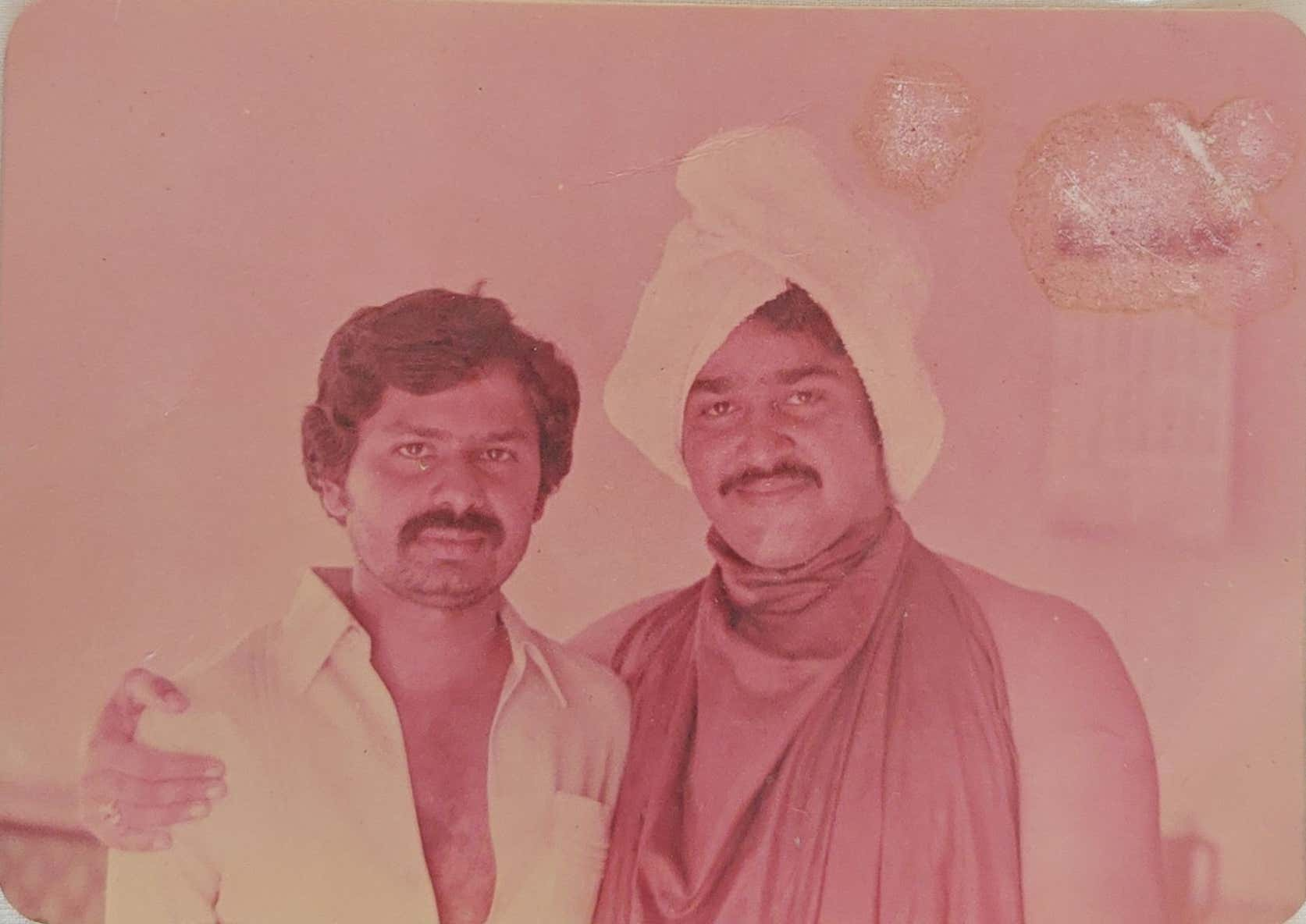
Director S. Anil Kumar with Mohanlal during the shooting of Adiverukal (1986).
