= Adukkan Entheluppam =

1986 film directed by Jeassy

- Poster designed by P. N. Menon
- Directed by: Jeassy
- Written by: P V Kuriakose, Joseph Madapally
- Produced by: K M Abraham
- Starring: Mammootty; Karthika; Shankar; Jose Prakash
- Music by: Jerry Amaldev
- Production company: Santhosh Movie Tone
- Distributed by: Saj movies
- Release date: 19 June 1986
- Country: India
- Language: Malayalam

Adukkan Entheluppam is a 1986 Indian Malayalam-language film, directed by Jeassy. The film stars Mammootty, Karthika, Shankar and Jose Prakash in lead roles. The film had musical score by Jerry Amaldev.

== Cast ==
- Mammootty as Srinivasan Nair
- Shankar as Satheeshan
- Karthika as Vimala
- Ragini
- Jose Prakash as Menon
- Sukumari as Bharathi
- M. G. Soman as Williams
- Mala Aravindan as Markose
- Adoor Bhasi as San Diego
- Bahadoor as Peter
- Valsala Menon as Dr. Jameela
- Lalu Alex as Nandakumar
- Vincent
- Lizzy

== Soundtrack ==
The music was composed by Jerry Amaldev and the lyrics were written by Bichu Thirumala.

| No. | Song | Singers | Lyrics | Length (m:ss) |
|---|---|---|---|---|
| 1 | "Onnum Onnum Randu" | K. J. Yesudas | Bichu Thirumala | |
| 2 | "Raavinte Tholil" | K. J. Yesudas, K. S. Chithra | Bichu Thirumala | |
| 3 | "Vasantham Thalirthu" | K. J. Yesudas, Lathika, Sunanda | Bichu Thirumala | |
