= Neela Kurinji Poothappol =

- Directed by: Bharathan
- Written by: John Paul
- Screenplay by: John Paul
- Produced by: Bharathan
- Starring: Nedumudi Venu Karthika; Sreenivasan; Girish Karnad
- Cinematography: Vasanth Kumar
- Edited by: Ravi
- Music by: Jerry Amaldev
- Production company: Soyis
- Distributed by: Soyis
- Release date: 9 January 1987
- Country: India
- Language: Malayalam

Neela Kurinji Poothappol is a 1987 Indian Malayalam film, directed and produced by Bharathan. It is a loose adaptation of the 1984 American romantic comedy film Blame It on Rio (a remake of the 1977 French film Un moment d'égarement), directed by Stanley Donen. The story development and details has been modified to suit then contemporary moderate Keralite family and socioeconomic values. The film stars Girish Karnad, Nedumudi Venu, Karthika and Sreenivasan in the lead roles. The film has musical score by Jerry Amaldev.

== Plot ==
Sivaramakrishnan Nair leads a happy life comprising his wife Omana Kunjamma and five children. His eldest daughter Sandhya is good at playing pranks. Omana Kunjamma wants her to marry Purushu, the son of her elder sister; he runs an antique shop. On a vacation, Sivaramakrishnan Nair's childhood friend Lt. Col. C. Appuni Menon visits them following his retirement from the defense force. Nair, a fun-loving person does not want his friend to leave him and offers he stay at his home. Appuni Menon is a strict disciplinarian bachelor who initially finds it difficult to get along with the atmosphere of the house. However, with time, he makes friendship with the children and gets accustomed to the life. In due time, Sandhya falls in love with Appuni; he finds it difficult to refuse. Upon knowing the relation, Sivaramakrishnan breaks down and orders Menon to leave the house. Despite all efforts, Sandhya refuses to give up her love and opens up with Purushu for support. Purushu, with a broken heart, convinces Sivaramakrishnan to accept the relationship between Menon and Sandhya. Appuni Nair has left the home, drinks heavily and picks up a fight in a bar. He is terribly assaulted by a bunch of youths. Broken down, Menon commits suicide. Unaware of what has happened, Sandhya is in a triumph mood after her father's decision. All of a sudden, an army vehicle arrives at the house with the dead body of Menon. The officer hands over a letter which was found with Menon for Nair. Menon apologized for the pain he caused his dear friend. Sandhya breaks down mentally and is seen lying down with Menon's uniform shirt in the background.

== Cast ==
- Karthika as Sandhya Nair
- Sreenivasan as Purushothaman
- Girish Karnad as Appu Menon /C. A. Menon (voiced by Murali)
- Nedumudi Venu as Sivaramakrishnan Nair
- KPAC Lalitha as Omana Kunjamma
- Innocent as Kuttan Nair
- Yadu Krishnan as Shanku Nair
- Shyama as Sindhu Nair
- Vidhukrishnan as Damu
- P. Sukumar (Kiran) as Man at beach

== Soundtrack ==
The music was composed by Jerry Amaldev and the lyrics were written by Kavalam Narayana Panicker.

No.	Song	Singers	Lyrics	Length (m:ss)
1	"Mele Nandanam Poothe"	S. Janaki, Krishnachandran	Kavalam Narayana Panicker	
2	"Thaazhe Veenu Maanam"	Lathika	Kavalam Narayana Panicker	
