= Karthika (Malayalam actress) =

Indian Malayalam Actress

- Occupation: Actor
- Years active: 1984–1988
- Known for: Thalavattam (1986); Nayakan (1987)
- Spouse: Dr. Sunil Kumar (m. 1988)
- Children: 1
- Parent: Captain P. K. R. Nair (father)

Sunanda Nair, better known by her stage name Karthika is an Indian former actress who worked predominantly in Malayalam movies and a few Tamil movies. She was one of the popular lead Malayalam actresses during 1984-1988.She is well known for her portrayal of Charumathy in Nayakan (1987).

== Early life ==
Karthika was born in Thiruvananthapuram, Kerala to Captain P. K. R. Nair, a retired army officer, Ex Servicemen Corporation Chairman and leader of Ex-Service Congress affiliated to the Indian National Congress. Her mother is a homemaker. She has a sister, Sujatha Balgovind. She is a trained classical dancer and Kathakali artist. She is also an amateur Tennis player.

== Film career ==
Karthika made her cinema debut as a junior artist. Her first film was in 1984, Oru Painkilikatha directed by Balachandra Menon. She played one of the group dancers in the movie. However, she got a heroine role in the very next year. Her second film is Manicheppu Thurannappol. In the movie, she played one among the female leads along with Jalaja.

She has worked in twenty films, among which two films are Tamil films and the rest are Malayalam films. Adiverukal, Thalavattam, Sanmanassullavarkku Samadhanam, Neela Kurinji Poothappol, Ente Entethu Mathram, Desatanakkili Karayarilla, Kariyilakkattu Pole and Adukkan Entheluppam are the films performed by her in 1986. In 1987, she worked in films like Idanazhiyil Oru Kaalocha, Gandhinagar 2nd Street, Unnikale Oru Kadha Parayam, Neeyethra Dhanya, January Oru Orma and Ivide Ellavarkkum Sukham. David David Mr. David and Avanikunnile Kinnari Pookkal are the films performed by her in 1988 and 1989 respectively.

She made her Tamil debut in 1987 through Nayagan with Kamal Haasan, Saranya Ponvannan and Nizhalgal Ravi. The film directed by Mani Ratnam. Her second and final Tamil film was with Sathyaraj in Poovizhi Vasalile directed by Fazil.

At the peak of her career, Karthika decided to quit the film industry. She married Dr. Sunil Kumar and went to the United States. The couple has a son, Vishnu. She is now settled in Thiruvananthapuram.

== Filmography ==
| Year | Film | Role | Language | Notes | Ref. |
|---|---|---|---|---|---|
| 1979 | Prabhaathasandhya | Young Usha | Malayalam | Child artist | |
| 1984 | Oru Painkilikatha | Dancer | Malayalam | Uncredited junior artist | |
| 1985 | Manicheppu Thurannappol | Karthika | Malayalam | Debut | |
| 1986 | Desatanakkili Karayarilla | Nirmala | Malayalam | | |
| 1986 | Kariyilakkattu Pole | Shilpa | Malayalam | | |
| 1986 | Ente Entethu Mathrem | Sheela | Malayalam | | |
| 1986 | Adukkan Entheluppam | Vimala | Malayalam | | |
| 1986 | Gandhinagar 2nd Street | Maya | Malayalam | | |
| 1986 | Thalavattam | Savithri | Malayalam | | |
| 1986 | Sanmanassullavarkku Samadhanam | Meera | Malayalam | | |
| 1986 | Adiverukal | Sreedevi | Malayalam | | |
| 1987 | Neela Kurinji Poothappol | Sandhya | Malayalam | | |
| 1987 | Poovizhi Vasalile | Yamuna | Tamil | | |
| 1987 | January Oru Orma | Nimmy | | | |
| 1987 | Ivide Ellavarkum Sukham | Gigi Varma | | | |
| 1987 | Neeyethra Dhanya | Shyama | | | |
| 1987 | Idanazhiyil Oru Kaalocha | Abhirami | | | |
| 1987 | Unnikale Oru Kadha Parayam | Animol | | | |
| 1987 | Nayakan | Charumathi | Tamil | | |
| 1988 | David David Mr. David | Karthika | | | |
| 1991 | Aavanikunnile Kinnaripookkal | Indu | | | |

== Personal life ==
Karthika married Sunil Kumar in 1988. She has a son, Vishnu Sunil Jaikumar, a Veterinary Surgeon & Radiologist.
