= Kadinte Makkal =

- Directed by: P. S. Prakash
- Written by: Ramesh Naidu; M. T. Vasudevan Nair (dialogues)
- Screenplay by: P. S. Prakash
- Cinematography: P. S. Prakash
- Music by: Ramesh Naidu
- Production company: Sangeethalaya
- Distributed by: Sangeethalaya
- Release date: 7 February 1986
- Country: India
- Language: Malayalam

Kadinte Makkal is a 1986 Indian Malayalam film, directed by P. S. Prakash. The film has musical score by Ramesh Naidu.
