= Ente Entethu Mathrem =

1986 Indian film

- Poster designed by Kitho
- Directed by: J. Sasikumar
- Screenplay by: Kaloor Dennis
- Story by: A. R. Mukesh
- Produced by: Baby Paul
- Starring: Mohanlal; Karthika; Baby Shalini; Lalu Alex
- Cinematography: N. A. Thara
- Edited by: G. Venkittaraman
- Music by: Johnson
- Production company: Beejees Films
- Distributed by: Beejees Release
- Release date: 26 April 1986
- Country: India
- Language: Malayalam

Ente Entethu Mathrem (transl. Mine, mine alone) is a 1986 Indian Malayalam-language family drama film directed by J. Sasikumar and written by Kaloor Dennis from a story by A. R. Mukesh. The film stars Mohanlal, Karthika, Baby Shalini and Lalu Alex. The film has music composed by Johnson.

== Plot ==
Bindu returning home to visit her ailing mother. She carefully gathers flowers to present to her. At the hospital, her mother receives a new doctor, and her father recounts his wife's story to the physician. Menon, the owner of a construction company, is father to Sreekutty. His wife died during childbirth. Sreekutty longs for a mother figure like her peers.

Enter Sheela, Menon's newly appointed personal assistant. Sreekutty and Sheela quickly develop a close bond, with Sreekutty even introducing Sheela as her mother at school on Mother's Day. Witnessing their affectionate relationship, Menon proposes to Sheela. However, she declines, already committed to another engagement. Despite this, Sheela invites Menon and Sreekutty to her wedding.

Events take a dramatic turn when Sreekutty is bitten by their dog, hospitalized with rabies. Sheela rushes back to care for her, postponing her own wedding. Sreekutty eventually recovers under Sheela's devoted care. But upon returning home, she discovers her fiancé has married another woman. Subsequently, Sheela and Menon marry, and the trio enjoy a period of happiness.

However, tensions arise after the birth of Sheela's first child. Sreekutty becomes increasingly envious of the baby's attention. Matters escalate, leading to a heated argument during which Sreekutty flees to Menon's work site and tragically meets her demise.

The aftermath leaves Sheela emotionally and physically debilitated. Years later, Bindu, Menon and Sheela's daughter, bears a striking resemblance to Sreekutty. Returning home from her convent boarding school, Bindu eagerly anticipates reuniting with her mother. Sadly, by the time she arrives, Sheela's condition deteriorates, and she passes away.

== Cast ==
- Mohanlal as Menon
- Karthika as Sheela
- Shobana as Ambili
- Baby Shalini as Sreemol, Bindu (double role)
- Lalu Alex as Goudhaman
- Mala Aravindan as Sathyasheelan
- Innocent as Vakkachan
- Sukumari as Padmavathi/Sheela's mother
- Valsala Menon as Mother Superior
- Santhakumari as Kalyaniyamma
- Lalithasree as Rudrani
- James as Mathai

== Soundtrack ==
The music was composed by Johnson and the lyrics were written by R. K. Damodaran.

No.	Song	Singers	Lyrics	Length
1	"Aaromal Kunjurangu"	P. Susheela	R. K. Damodaran	3:52
2	"Nin Mounam"	M. G. Sreekumar	R. K. Damodaran	3:27
3	"Ponninkudam"	Lathika	R. K. Damodaran	4:13

== Reception ==
The film was a commercial success at the box office. It was one among the most successful films of Sasikumar.
