= Kariyilakkattu Pole =

- Poster designed by Roy P. Thomas
- Directed by: P. Padmarajan
- Screenplay by: P. Padmarajan
- Story by: Sudhakar Mangalodayam
- Produced by: Thankachan
- Starring: Mohanlal; Mammootty; Rahman; Sripriya; Karthika; Jalaja; Unni Mary
- Cinematography: Venu
- Edited by: B. Lenin
- Music by: Johnson
- Production company: Vishudhi Films
- Distributed by: Jubilee Productions
- Release date: 21 March 1986
- Running time: 138 minutes
- Country: India
- Language: Malayalam

Kariyilakkattu Pole (transl. Like a zephyr of dry leaves) is a 1986 Indian Malayalam-language mystery thriller film written and directed by P. Padmarajan. It is based on the radio drama Sisirathil Oru Prabhatham by Sudhakar Mangalodayam, the plot follows DySP Achuthankutty who is investigating the murder of a film director, Harikrishnan. The film stars Mohanlal, Mammootty, Rahman, Sripriya, Karthika, Jalaja, and Unni Mary. The background score was composed by Johnson. A Padmarajan classic, the film is widely considered one of the best investigative thrillers ever made in Malayalam.

== Plot ==
Harikrishnan, a famous movie director, is found dead at his house one morning. Deputy Superintendent of Police Achuthankutty is assigned to probe the death. Anilkumar, his younger brother, is in love with Shilpa, who had personally known the director and was shocked by his death. Achuthan Kutty's investigation leads to three different female suspects.

A woman's shoe from the murder scene and other shreds of evidence leads Achuthankutty to conclude that a woman was the killer. Achuthankutty finds a woman's photograph in Harikrishnan's diary. The investigation leads to a middle-aged woman: Parvathi, who has now become Bhagini Sevamayi, a saint who has long renounced her identity and has been living in a Hindu ashram ever since. He arrests her as she refuses to answer his questions. Shilpa tries to talk to Achuthankutty as Bhagini turns out to be her aunt.

Later, he is told more about the relation between Harikrishnan and Shilpa by Shilpa's mother and that she would visit him a lot. He is not able to figure out whether the relationship is purely paternal, seeing as she does not have a father figure in her life, or romantic. Shilpa breaks down and tells him that Harikrishnan was like an uncle and guide for her, but somehow her mother could not digest their relationship. Achuthankutty then uncovers Harikrishnan's past from Shilpa's mother.

As lecturers in their youth, Harikrishnan was a flirt. He gets into a relationship with a girl, who is revealed to be Parvathi, the woman that had been apprehended early. She tries to warn Parvathi about his flirtatious nature and bad intentions yet she wouldn't listen. Harikrishnan denies this and convinces Parvathi that he is loyal. He then rapes Shilpa's mother and leaves, breaking Parvathi's heart who eventually took up the life of a nun. Shilpa is revealed to be Harikrishnan's illicit child and her mother was afraid he would do the same to his own daughter without the knowledge that she was his child. She accepts that she had planned to kill Harikrishnan, but found him dead when she arrived at his house.

Achuthankutty decides to question Shilpa and her mother again, with more brutal methods. His brother Anil unsuccessfully tries to change his mind. Anil finally confesses his love for Shilpa. He then reveals that it was he who had murdered Harikrishnan out of jealousy but that it was an accident. He then commits suicide, leaving a bewildered Achuthankutty staring at his corpse. Achuthankutty burns Anil's suicide note and declares that he is unable to find the culprit.

== Cast ==
- Mohanlal as DySP Achuthankutty
- Mammootty as Film director Harikrishnan
- Rahman as Anil Kumar, Achuthankutty's brother
- Karthika as Shilpa
- Sripriya as Shilpa's mother
- Jalaja as Ragini
- Unni Mary as Bhaginisevamayi / Parvathi
- Valsala Menon as actress Thulasi's mother
- Krishnankutty Nair as watchman Appu Pilla
- Prem Prakash as Menon

== Production ==
The film is based on the radio drama Sisirathil Oru Prabhatham written by Sudhakar Mangalodayam and broadcast on Akashavani. His name was credited as Sudhakar P. Nair in the film. The film was first titled Aram (അറം), but later changed to Kariyilakkattu Pole due to superstitious reasons. The title was taken from a short story written by Padmarajan titled "Kariyilakkattu Pole".
