= Aalorungi Arangorungi =

1986 film by Chellappan

- Directed by: Thevalakkara Chellappan
- Written by: Johnson Pulinkunnu; Kaloor Dennis (dialogues)
- Screenplay by: Kaloor Dennis
- Starring: Mammootty; Shobhana; Bhagyalakshmi (actress); Menaka; Thilakan
- Cinematography: K. B. Dayalan
- Edited by: V. P. Krishnan
- Music by: Jerry Amaldev
- Production company: Vijaya Film Circuit
- Distributed by: Vijaya Film Circuit
- Release date: 21 February 1986
- Country: India
- Language: Malayalam

Aalorungi Arangorungi is a 1986 Indian Malayalam film, directed by Thevalakkara Chellappan. The film stars Mammootty, Shobhana, Menaka and Thilakan in the lead roles. The film has musical score by Jerry Amaldev.

== Plot ==
The film is about a police inspector who tries to live humanely as possible, and the associated events in his life.

== Cast ==
- Mammootty as Rajan
- Shobhana as Geetha
- Menaka as Marykutty
- Bhagyalakshmi as Radha
- Thilakan as Prabhakara Menon
- Pattom Sadan as Vareechan
- Sathaar as Kaduva Thommachan
- Kaduvakulam Antony as P. C. Kunjappan
- Kuyili as Nisha
- Lalithasree as Soshamma Cherian
- Lalu Alex as Thampi
- Mala Aravindan as Mathunni, Chakkunni (double role)
- Meena as Padmavathi
- P. K. Abraham as Doctor
- Mukesh as Vinod
- Kollam Ajith as Gunda

== Soundtrack ==
The music was composed by Jerry Amaldev and the lyrics were written by Poovachal Khader.

No.	Song	Singers	Lyrics	Length (m:ss)
1	"Devatha Nee Varade"	K. J. Yesudas	Poovachal Khader	
2	"Kanaka Munthiri"	K. J. Yesudas, K. S. Chithra	Poovachal Khader	
3	"Navam Navam Prakaashamaay"	K. P. Brahmanandan, C. O. Anto	Poovachal Khader	
