= Pranamam =

- Poster
- Directed by: Bharathan
- Screenplay by: Dennis Joseph
- Story by: Bharathan
- Produced by: Joy Thomas
- Starring: Mammootty; Suhasini; Nedumudi Venu; Ashokan
- Cinematography: Venu
- Music by: Ouseppachan
- Production company: Jubilee Productions
- Release date: 24 October 1986
- Country: India
- Language: Malayalam

Pranamam is a 1986 Indian Malayalam-language film, directed by Bharathan and produced by Joy Thomas. The film stars Mammootty, Suhasini, Nedumudi Venu and Ashokan. The film was remade in Tamil as Puyal Paadum Paattu.

== Plot ==
Usha is a journalist. She decides to write an article on drug abuse by college students and does a photo feature on the issue. The article gets published and the students who appeared in the photos are suspended from their college. One of them, Georgekutty attempts suicide in shame and gets admitted in the hospital. The college students go into a rebellion against the newspaper and create a lot of problems, which are solved temporarily by a tactful police officer, Prathapan.

A gang of four students led by Damu and Appukkuttan kidnaps Usha, locks her up inside Damu's banglow, harasses and injects her with drugs. Usha later saves the boys when a fire breaks out at the banglow. The gang takes care of her when she falls ill. Usha gets to know the family background of each member of the gang. All except for Damu are from financially struggling families. Damu is from a rich, but dysfunctional family with his mother incarcerated in a mental asylum. Damu attempts suicide on his birthday, but is saved by his friends and Usha.

Prathapan visit the banglow searching for Usha. He beats up the boys during interrogation when Usha comes out defending the boys. Prathapan, a family friend of Usha is visibly seen close to Usha. Prathapan settles the issue and depart in friendly terms. They all together visit Usha's house where marriage is fixed between Usha and Prathapan.

Meanwhile, George Kutty dies. And an angry mob who sees Usha during the funeral procession attacks her and beats her to death during the clash.

== Cast ==
- Mammootty as DSP Minnal Prathapan
- Suhasini Mani Ratnam as Usha Warrier
- Ashokan as Damu
- Vineeth as Appukuttan
- Nedumudi Venu as Warrier
- Babu Antony as Ajith
- Prathapachandran as Chackochan
- K.P.A.C. Lalitha as Appukkuttan's sister
- Achankunju as Chandran's father
- Thodupuzha Vasanthi
- Valsala Menon as Damu's mother

== Soundtrack ==
The music was composed by Ouseppachan, with lyrics by Bharathan.

No.	Song	Singers	Length (m:ss)
1	"Thaalam Maranna Thaarattu" (F)	K. S. Chithra	4:47
2	"Thaalam Maranna Thaarattu" (M)	M. G. Sreekumar	4:47
3	"Kadalilaki Karayodu Cholli"	Krishnachandran, Lathika, M. G. Sreekumar	4:45
4	"Thalirilayil Thaalam Thulli"	K. S. Chithra	3:59

The song "Thaalam Maranna Tharattu" is set in Bharathan's favourite raagam, Hindolam.
