= List of Malayalam films of 1989 =

The following is a list of Malayalam films released in the year 1989.

Film	Director	Screenplay	Cast
Mrugaya	I. V. Sasi	A. K. Lohithadas	Mammootty, Sunitha, Urvashi, Thilakan
Maharajavu	P. Krisahnaraj		Murali, Shari, Captain Raju
Crime Branch	K. S. Gopalakrishnan	Pappanamkodu Lakshmanan	Jagathy Sreekumar, P. C. George, Prameela
Prabhatham Chuvanna Theruvil	N. P. Suresh		Ratheesh, Anuradha
Lal Americayil	Sathyan Anthikkad	Cochin Haneefa	Mohanlal, Prem Nazir
Muthukkudayum Choodi	Biju Thomas		Mukesh, Sithara, Jagathi Sreekumar
Charithram	G. S. Vijayan	S. N. Swamy	Mammootty, Rahman, Lizy, Shobana
Pooram	Nedumudi Venu	Nedumudi Venu	Vishnu Rajagopal, Maathu
Douthyam	Anil	Gayathri Ashokan	Mohanlal, Suresh Gopi, Lizy, Parvathy
Mudra	Sibi Malayil	A. K. Lohithadas	Mammootty, Madhu, Mukesh
Aksharathettu	I. V. Sasi		Suresh Gopi, Urvashi, Mukesh
Swagatham	Venu Nagavally	Venu Nagavally	Jayaram, Urvashi, Parvathy, Ashokan
Puthiya Karukkal	Thampi Kannanthanam	Cochin Haneefa	Jayaram, Parvathy
Adikkurippu	K. Madhu	S. N. Swamy	Mammootty, Urvashi, Jagathy
Kodungallur Bhagavathi	C. Baby		
Aval Oru Sindhu	P. K. Krishnan		Sathaar, Pappu, Ravi Menon
Vaadaka Gunda	Gandikkuttan		Jagathy Sreekumar, Suresh Gopi
Season	P. Padmarajan	P. Padmarajan	Mohanlal
Varavelpu	Sathyan Anthikkad	Sreenivasan	Mohanlal, Revathi, Sreenivasan
Oru Vadakkan Veeragatha	Hariharan	M. T. Vasudevan Nair	Mammootty, Madhavi, Suresh Gopi, Balan K. Nair
Rathi	Jayadevan		Jayalalitha
Kalpana House	P. Chandrakumar		Abhilasha
Utharam	V. K. Pavithran	M. T. Vasudevan Nair	Mammootty, Suparna, Sukumaran, arvathy
Najangalude Kochu Doctor	Balachandra Menon	Balachandra Menon	Srividya, Thilakan, Balachandra Menon, Revathy
Naduvazhikal	Joshiy	S. N. Swami	Mohanlal, Madhu, Rupini, Devan, Murali
New Year	Viji Thampi	Kaloor Dennis	Jayaram, Suresh Gopi, Urvasi, Sukumaran
Aazhikkoru Muthu	Sophy		Ratheesh, Sukumaran
Jeevitham Oru Raagam	U. V. Raveendranath		Devan, Shari
Vadakkunokkiyantram	Sreenivasan	Sreenivasan	Sreenivasan, Parvathi
Adharvam	Dennis Joseph	Shibu Chakravarthy	Mammootty, Ganesh Kumar, Parvathy
Asthikal Pookkunnu	P. Sreekumar		Murali, Chithra
Ammavanu Pattiya Amali	Augustin Prakash		Mukesh, Thilakan
Devadas	Crossbelt Mani		Venu Nagavally, Ramya Krishna
Peruvannapurathe Visheshangal	Kamal	Ranjith	Jayaram, Parvathy
Pandu Pandoru Desathu	A E Satheeshan		Nedumudi Venu, Sharada, Murali
Miss Pameela	Chellappan		Silk Smitha, Suresh Gopi
Ivalente Kamuki	K. S. Sivachandran		
Kireedam	Sibi Malayil	A. K. Lohithadas	Mohanlal, Thilakan, Parvathy
Rugmini	K. P. Kumaran		Nedumudi Venu, Anju
Anagha	P. R. S. Babu		Nedumudi Venu, Parvathi
Carnivel	P. G. Viswambaran	S. N. Swamy	Mammootty, Parvathy, Sukumaran
Artham	Sathyan Anthikkad	Venu Nagavally	Mammootty, Saranya, Sreenivasan
Krooran	K. S. Gopalakrishnan		Jagathy Sreekumar, Priya
Nagarangalil Chennu Raparkam	Viji Thampi	Ranjith	Jayaram, Sreenivasan, Suparna
Ramji Rao Speaking	Siddique-Lal	Siddique-Lal	Sai Kumar, Mukesh, Innocent, Rekha
Jaathakam	Suresh Uniithan		Jayaram, Shari, Madhu, Thilakan
Piravi	Shaji N. Karun		Premji, Archana
Aattinakkare	S. L. Puram Anand		Sukumaran, Lissy
Chakkikotha Chankaran	Krishnakumar	VR Gopalakrishnan	Jayaram, Nedumudi Venu, Thilakan, Geetha, Urvashi
Rathibhaavam	P. Chandra Kumar		
My Dear Rosy	P. K. Krishnan		
Pradeshika Varthakal	Kamal	Ranjith	Jayaram, Parvathy
Chanakyan	T. K. Rajeev Kumar	Sab John	Kamal Haasan, Jayaram, Thilakan, Urmila Matondkar
Vandanam	Priyadarsan	V. R. Gopalakrishnan	Mohanlal, Mukesh, Girija Shettar, Nedumudi Venu
Nair Saab	Joshiy	Dennis Joseph - Shibu Chakravarthy	Mammootty, Suresh Gopi, Mukesh, Geetha, Sumalatha, Lizy
Oru Sayahnathinte Swapnam	Bharathan	John Paul Puthusery	Suhasini, Madhu, Mukesh, Nedumudi Venu
Ancharakkulla Vandi	Jayadevan		Jayalalitha, Ravi Varma, Uma Maheswari, Priya
Prayapoorthi Aayavarkku Mathram	Suresh		
Bhadrachitta	Prem Nazir		Geetha, Sukumaran, Devan
Adhipan	K. Madhu	Jagadeesh	Mohanlal, Parvathy, Monisha
Dasharatham	Sibi Malayil	A. K. Lohithadas	Mohanlal, Rekha, Murali
Mahayanam	Joshiy	A. K. Lohithadas	Mammootty, Seema, Mukesh
Malayathippennu	K. S. Gopalakrishnan		Suganthi, Bablu
Mazhavilkavadi	Sathyan Anthikkad	Raghunath Paleri	Jayaram, Sithara, Urvashi
Ashokante Aswathikuttikku	Vijayan Karote	Kaloor Dennis	Ashokan, Parvathi
Annakutty Kodambakkam Vilikkunnu	Jagathi Sreekumar		Jagathy Sreekumar, Suresh Gopi, Sai Kumar, Sreeja
Aayiram Chirakulla Moham	Ashokan		
Varnam	Ashokan		Jayaram, Suresh Gopi, Ranjini
Eenam Thettatha Kattaru	P. Vinod Kumar		
Kaalal Pada	Viji Thampi	Ranjith	Jayaram, Rahman, Suresh Gopi, Ranjini, Thilakan
Naagapanchami	Sasikumar		
The News	Shaji Kailas		Suresh Gopi, Lizy
Layanam	Thulasidas		Silk Smitha, Abhilasha, Nandu
Mizhiyorangalil	J. Williams		Rahman, Rohini
Agnipravesham			
Jagratha	K. Madhu	S. N. Swamy	Mammootty, Mukesh, Jagathy, Parvathy
Alicinte Anveshanam	T. V. Chandran	T. V. Chandran	Jalaja, Ravindranath, Nedumudi Venu
Unni	G. Aravindan		Shankar, Shobana

== Dubbed films ==
film	Direction	Story	Screenplay	Main Actors
Vanitha Reporter	Somu			
Ithoru Bhookambam	Mohandas			
Vajraayudham	Raghavendra			
