= Srividya filmography =

Srividya (24 July 1953 – 19 October 2006), was an Indian actress best known for her work predominantly in Malayalam and Tamil films, along with few Telugu, Kannada and Hindi films. In a career spanning for 40 years, she had acted in more than 800 films. In the latter part of her career, she concentrated on Malayalam films.

== Filmography ==
=== Malayalam ===
Year	Title	Role	Notes
1969	Chattambikkavala	Susie	
1969	Kumara Sambhavam	Menaka	
1970	Ambalapravu	Sarala	
1970	Swapnangal	Radha	
1973	Dharmayudham	Sreedevi	
1973	Chenda	Sumathi	
1974	Vrindavanam	Shantha	
1974	Thacholi Marumakan Chandu	Kanni	
1974	Thumbolarcha	Kunjunnooli	
1974	Arakallan Mukkalkallan	Alli	
1974	Sapthaswarangal	Saraswathy	
1974	Ayalathe Sundari	Malini	
1974	Rajahamsam	Saraswathy "Sarasu"	
1975	Maa Nishaada	Sumathi	
1975	Akkaldaama	Rani	
1975	Aaranyakaandam	Sreedevi	
1975	Ulsavam	Sumathi	
1975	Babumon	Sharada	
1975	Swami Ayappan	Pandalam Maharani	
1976	Pushpasharam	Geetha	
1976	Samasya	Devi	
1976	Theekkanal	Vimala	
1976	Amma	Subhadra	
1976	Chottanikkara Amma	Chottanikkara Devi	
1976	Amba Ambika Ambalika	Amba	
1976	Kamadhenu	Sathi	
1976	Hridayam Oru Kshethram	Prema	
1977	Parivarthanam	Gracy	
1977	Muhurthangal	Ambika	
1977	Sreemad Bhagavathgeetha	Rajasree	
1977	Sri Krishna Leela	Yashodha	
1978	Ottakam	Rajalakshmi	
1979	Swapnangal Swanthamalla	Ramani	
1979	Ward No 7	Sandhya	
1979	Ini Yaathra	Vidhu	
1979	Sudhikalasam	Sridevi Menon	
1979	Oru Raagam Pala Thaalam	Meena	
1979	Pushyaraagam	Lakshmi Amma	
1979	Aval Niraparathi	Sindhu	
1979	Ivide Kattinu Sugantham	Radha	
1979	Prabhaasandhya	Usha	
1979	Swapnangal Swanthamalla	Devamma	
1979	Krishnaparunthu	Kamalakshi	
1979	Agniparvatham	Lakshmi	
1979	Thenthulli	Janamma	
1979	Puthiya Velicham	Lakshmi	
1979	Venalil Oru Mazha	Kamalakshi	
1979	Anupallavi	Radha	
1979	Jeevitham Oru Gaanam	Thresiamma	
1979	Edavazhiyile Poocha Minda Poocha	Rohini	
1980	Vilangum Veenayum	Veena	
1980	Pappu	Herself	
1980	Swantham Enna Padham	Usha	
1980	Dooram Arike	Gouri	
1980	Digvijayam	Soumini	
1980	Ambalavilakku	Sumathi	
1980	Ormakale Vida Tharoo	Jaanu	
1980	Raagam Thaanam Pallavi	Nandini	
1980	Abhimanyu	Seetha	
1980	Puzha	Devu	
1980	Chaakara	Nimmy	
1980	Aagamanam	Thulasi	
1980	Vaiki Vanna Vasatham	Vimala	
1980	Meen	Devootti	
1980	Agnikshetram	Sreedevi	
1980	Muthuchippikal	Vijayalakshmi	
1980	Aswaaradham	Jayanthy Shankar	
1980	Deepam	Padmini	
1980	Theekkadal	Sreedevi	
1980	Shakthi	Dr. G. Malathi	
1980	Vilkkanundu Swapnangal	Malathi	
1981	Rajani	Rajani	
1981	Dhanya		
1981	Sreeman Sreemathi	Kousalya	
1981	Visham	Saradha	
1981	Sambhavam		
1981	Paathiraasooryan	Joly	
1981	Dantha Gopuram	Sathi	
1981	Sankarsham	Priyadarshini	
1981	Ellam Ninakku Vendi	Jayalakshmi	
1981	Thaaraavu	Kakkamma	
1981	Grihalakshmi	Janaki	
1981	Swarangal Swapnagal	Ramani	
1981	Enne Snehikku Enne Maathrem		
1981	Thaaraattu	Sreedevi	
1981	Itha Oru Dhikkari	Ammini	
1981	Raktham	Malathi	
1981	Kathayariyathe	Geetha	
1981	Ithihaasam	Lakshmi	
1981	Attimari	Geetha	
1981	Aakkramanam	Dr. Gracy	
1982	Njan Ekanannu	Dr.Seethalakshmi	
1982	Ithiri Neram Othiri Karyam	Dr. Susheela Shekharan	
1982	Ethiraalikal	Ammini	
1982	Aakrosham	Prabha Rajashekharan	
1982	Sree Ayyappanum Vavarum	Safiya	
1982	Idiyum Minnalum		
1982	Aadarsham	Sulochana	
1982	Aarambham	Saradha	
1982	Ivan Oru Simham	Lakshmi	
1982	Dheera	Vimala Menon/Rani	
1982	Beedi Kunjamma	Kunjamma	
1982	Saram	Sreedevi	
1982	Chilanthivala	School teacher	
1983	Ankam	Thresia	
1983	Kodumkattu	Sujatha	
1983	Passport	Saraswathi	
1983	Aana	Umatha	
1983	Prem Nazirne Kaanamanilla	Herself	
1983	Kaikeyi		
1983	Rathilayam	Nabisu	
1983	Yudham	Ayisha	
1983	Arabikkadal		
1983	Aana	Umatha	
1983	Pankayam		
1983	Paalam	Lakshmi	
1983	Naanayam	Sumathi	
1983	Ee Yugam	Aparna	
1983	Rachana	Sharada	
1983	Prathigna	Lakshmi	
1983	Oru Mukham Pala Mukham	Subadrama Thankachi	
1983	Pinnilavu	Sreevidya	
1983	Kattathe Kilikkoodu	Sarada	
1983	Mortuary	Justice Lakshmi Menon	
1983	Bhookambam	Aswathi	
1983	Adaminte Vaariyellu	Alice	
1984	Idavelakku Shesham	Lakshmi	
1984	Chakkarayumma	Zeenath	
1984	Krishna Guruvaayoorappa	Kururamma	
1984	Kadamattathachan	Sethulakshmi/Kaliyankattu Neeli	
1984	Anthassu		
1984	Oru Thettinte Kadha		
1984	Alakadalinakkare		
1984	Amme Narayana	Aadhi Paraashakthi / Lakshmi / Saraswathi / Parvathi / Chottanikkara Amma	
1984	Kurishuyudham	Rosamma	
1984	Nethavu		
1984	Oru Painkilikkadha	Rajeswari	
1984	Raajavembaala		
1984	Panchavadi Palam	Mandodhari Amma	
1984	Shapadham	Sridevi	
1984	Arante Mulla Kochu Mulla	Thankamani Kunjamma	
1985	Ozhivukaalam	Chinnu's mother	
1985	Jwalanam		
1985	Chillukottaram		
1985	Irakal	Annie	
1985	Onathumbikkoroonjal	Adv. Saraswathi	
1985	Upahaaram	Sarojini Chandran	
1985	Kannaram Pothi Pothi	Bhavani	
1985	Daivatheorthu	Rugmini	
1985	Vellam	Deenamma	
1985	Ayanam	Saramma	
1985	Mukya Manthri	Lakshmi	
1985	Ivide Ee Theerathu	Madhaviyamma	
1985	Orikkal Oridathu	Subhadra	
1985	Thinkalazhcha Nalla Divasam	Ambika	
1985	Janakeeya Kodathi	Suma	
1985	Azhiyatha Bandhangal	Vasundhara Menon	
1986	Udayam Padinjaaru	Seethalakshmi	
1986	Oru Yuga Sandhya	Kathamma	
1986	Ashtabandham	Jameela	
1986	Vivahitare Itihile	Music Teacher	
1986	Sayam Sandhya	Uma	
1986	Poomukhappadiyil Ninneyum Kathu	Clara Issac	
1986	Ennennum Kannettante	Vasanthi	
1986	Kshamichu Ennoru Vakku	Sasikala	
1986	Geetham	Aparna's mother	
1986	Pranamam		
1987	Kanikaanum Neram		
1987	Swathi Thirunal	Gowri Parvati Bayi \|	
1987	Jaalakam	Lakshmi	
1988	Athirthikkal	Reetha	
1988	Suprabhatha		
1989	Ormakurippu		
1989	Njattuvela		
1989	Nakshtra Deepangal		
1989	Njagalude Kochu Doctor	Thankam	
1990	Manju Peyyunna Raathri		
1990	Guest House		
1990	Innale	Dr. Sandhya	
1990	Vachanam	Aryadevi	
1990	Samrajyam	Lakshmi	
1991	Ente Sooryaputhrikku	K.S. Vasundhara Devi	
1991	Advaitham	Saraswathy	
1991	Neelagiri	Radha Menon	
1992	Daivathinte Vikrithikal	Maggie	
1992	Kudumbasametham	Radhalakshmi	
1992	Cheppadividya	Rachel Mathew	
1992	Rajashilpi	Lakshibhai Thampuraatti	
1993	Devasuram		
1993	Ghazal	Thangal's wife	
1993	Kudumbasneham		
1993	O' Faby	Sophie	
1994	Kabooliwala	Sreedevi	
1994	Paalayam	Susan Fernandez	
1994	Bharanakoodam		
1994	Daivathinte Vikrithikal	Maggie	
1994	Ezhuthachan		
1994	Pavithram	Devakiamma	
1994	Pavam Ia Ivachan	Rosy	
1994	Saaramsham		
1994	Gandeevam		
1995	Indian Military Intelligence	Shivaprasad's mother	
1995	Rajakeeyam	Kannamma	
1996	King Solomon	Ambika Nair	
1996	Kanchanam	Arundathi Devi	
1996	Dilliwala Rajakumaran	Padmini	
1996	The Prince	Jeeva's mother	
1997	Aniyathi Pravu	Chandrika	
1997	Aaraam Thampuran	Subhadra Thampuratti	
1997	Masmaram	Maria	
1997	Oru Mutham Manimutham	Lakshmi	
1997	Poonilamazha		
1997	Manasam	Rajalakshmi	
1997	Krishnagudiyil Oru Pranayakalathu	Mrs. Nair	
1997	Innalakalillathe	Rosili Thomas	
1998	Nakshatratharattu		
1998	Ammayude Makan		Short film
1998	Sooryaputhran		
1998	Kusruthi Kuruppu	Dr.Shyamala	
1998	Achaammakkuttiyude Achaayan	Achaama	
1998	Ayushman Bhava	Sunny's mother	
1998	Ayal Kadha Ezhuthukayanu	Padmini	
1998	Sidhartha	Sridevi	
1999	Ustaad	Dr. Malathi Menon	
1999	Vazhunnor	Kochammini	
1999	Agni Sakshi	Antharjanam	
1999	Gandhian	Susanna John	
2000	Ee Mazha Thenmazha	Rekha's mother	
2000	Dreams	Thanka	
2000	Nadan Pennum Natupramaniyum	Govindankutty's mother	
2000	Ingane Oru Nilapakshi	Subhadra Thampuratti	
2001	Ennu Sambhavaami Yude Yuge	Professor	
2001	Manassu Muthal Manassu Vare		
2001	Ponnu		
2001	Jeevan Masai	Mashayudha's wife	
2001	Nagaravadhu	Amrita Thripati	
2001	Randam Bhavam	Parvathi	
2002	Malayali Mamanu Vanakkam	Anandakuttan's mother	
2003	Malsaram	Kannan Bhai's mother	
2003	Mullavalliyum Thenmavum	Kanakambal	
2003	Swapnam Kondu Thulabharam	Prabhavathi	
2006	Chacko Randaaman		
2011	Naayika	Herself	Archive footage/Uncredited cameo
2015	Two Countries	Actress	Archive footage from Venalil Oru Mazha; Uncredited
2019	Thanka Bhasma Kuriyitta Thamburatty	Herself	Archive footage Uncredited cameo

=== Tamil ===
Year	Title	Role	Notes
1967	Thiruvarutchelvar	Dancer	
1967	Sri Guruvayurappan		
1968	Moondrezhuthu	Malathi	
1968	Neelagiri Express	Dancer	
1969	Kumara Sambhavam	Menaka	
1970	Manippoor Maamiyaar		
1970	Jill Jill Rojamani		
1970	Kasthuri Thilakam	Thankam	
1971	Thanga Gopuram	Shanthi	
1971	Anbukkor Annan		
1971	Nangu Suvargal	Ponni	
1971	Nootrukku Nooru	Manjula	
1971	Annai Velankanni	Chellayee	
1972	Delhi to Madras	Maala	
1972	Velli Vizha	Kalyani	
1972	Unakkum Enakkum	Gowri	
1973	Karaikkal Ammaiyar	Goddess Parvathi	
1973	Sollathaan Ninaikkiren	Kamala	
1973	Thirumalai Deivam	Goddess Lakshmi	
1974	Sisubalan	Vaisali	
1975	Swami Ayyappan	Pandalam Maharan	
1975	Apoorva Raagangal	M. R. Bhairavi	
1975	Nambikai Natchathiram		
1976	Nalla Penmani	Santhi	
1976	Athirshtam Azhaikirathu	Ambujam	
1976	Jai Balaji		
1976	Kaalangalil Aval Vasantham	Raji	
1976	Unarchigal	Maragadham	
1976	Asai 60 Naal	Bhuvana	
1977	Durgadevi		
1977	Rowdy Rakkamma	Rakkamma	
1977	Madhurageetham	Radha	
1977	Sri Krishna Leela	Rukamani	
1977	Avar Enakke Sontham	Kavitha	
1977	Aarupushpangal	Malli	
1978	Thangarangan		
1978	Thirukkalyanam	Udaya	
1978	Shri Kanchi Kamakshi		
1978	Radhai Ketra Kannan	Radha	
1978	Kanchi Kamakshi		
1978	Ilaya Rani Rajalakshmi		
1978	Uravugal Endrum Vazhga	Parimalam	
1979	Imayam	Kaveri	
1979	Chithira Chevvanam		
1979	Porter Ponnusamy		
1979	Kama Sasthiram	Seetha	
1979	Kandhar Alangaram	Alangari	
1979	Kadamai Nenjam	Parvathi	
1980	Nandri Karangal		
1980	Natacharithram		Guest appearance
1980	Ivargal Vithyasamanavargal		
1981	Dharmangal Sirikindrana	Malathi	
1981	Deiva Thirumanangal		
1982	Kelviyum Naane Pathilum Naane	Satyavati	
1983	Dowry Kalyanam	Uma	
1984	Ezhuthatha Sattangal	Sarada	
1984	Anbulla Malare		
1985	Navagraha Nayagi	Draupadi	
1985	Oonjalaadum Uravugal		
1985	Panam Pattum Seiyum	Jaya	
1985	Naam Iruvar	Sivakami	
1985	Needhiyin Nizhal	Vijay's mother	
1985	Thiramai		
1986	Neethikku Thandanai	Thilakavathi	
1986	Amman Kovil Kizhakale	Janaki	
1986	Mythili Ennai Kaathali		
1986	Murugane Thunai	Meenakshi	
1986	Oomai Vizhigal	Lakshmi	
1986	Punnagai Mannan	Padmini	
1987	Ananda Aradhanai	Vidya	
1987	Oru Thayin Sabhatham		
1987	Oorkuruvi	Kalyani	
1987	Neethikku Thandanai		
1987	Arul Tharum Ayyappan		
1987	Cooliekkaran	Lakshmi	
1987	Ival Oru Pournami		
1987	Ninaive Oru Sangeetham	Vallikannu	
1987	Sattam Oru Vilayaattu	Amudha	
1987	Elangeswaran	Kaikeyi	
1987	Pookkal Vidum Thudhu	Vani	
1987	Manithan	Lakshmi	
1988	En Thangai Kalyani		
1988	Ganam Courtar Avargale	Pankajam	
1988	Thaai Paasam	Lakshmi	
1989	Enne Petha Raasa	Kalyani	
1989	Thaai Naadu	Meenatchi Amma	
1989	Penn Puthi Munn Puthi		
1989	Varam		
1989	Apoorva Sagodharargal	Kaveri	
1989	Poruthathu Pothum	Punithavadi	
1989	Raaja Raajathan	Sarada	
1989	Mappillai	Rajarajeswari	
1989	Dravidan	Devayani	
1989	Vaathiyaar Veettu Pillai	Kamala	
1990	Seetha	Meenakshi	
1990	Ulagam Pirandhadhu Enakkaga		
1990	Inaindha Kaigal	Chandralekha	
1990	Uchi Veyil		
1990	Vaaliba Vilayattu		
1990	Amman Kovil Thiruvizha		
1990	Muruganay Thunai	Meenakshi	
1991	Vetri Padigal	Vidya	
1991	Karpoora Mullai	Vasundhara Devi K.S.	
1991	En Rasavin Manasile	Ponnuthayi	
1991	Gunaa		
1991	Nee Pathi Naan Pathi	Kalpanadevi	
1991	Amma Pillai	Lakshmi	
1991	Archana IAS	Bhavani	
1991	Aboorva Nagam	Annapurni	
1991	Oyilattam	Bhagyalakshmi	
1991	Eeramana Rojave	Shanthi's grandmother	
1991	Kizhakku Karai	Janaki	
1991	Adhikari	Duraipandi's mother	
1991	Thalapathi	Kalyani	
1992	Naangal	Lakshmi	
1992	Sivantha Malar	Sarada	
1992	Bharathan	Lakshmi	
1992	Senbaga Thottam		
1992	Oor Mariyadhai	Maala	
1992	Idhu Namma Bhoomi	Nagavalli	
1992	Chinna Poovai Killathe		
1992	Neenga Nalla Irukkanum		
1992	Moondrampadi	Parimalam	
1992	Mappillai Vanthachu		
1992	Deiva Vaakku	Hamsaveni's sister-in-law	
1992	Thirumathi Palanisamy	Parvathi	
1992	Naalaiya Theerpu	Mahalakshmi	
1992	Uyarnthavan	Lakshmi	
1993	Thangakkili		
1993	Poranthalum Ambalaiya Porakka Koodathu	Azhzkinachiyar	
1993	Uzhaippali		
1993	Band Master		
1993	Moondravadhu Kann	Rambha	
1993	Karuppu Vellai	Gayathri	
1993	Parvathi Ennai Paradi	Gayathri	
1993	Kattabomman	Devada	
1993	Purusha Lakshanam	Vidya	
1993	Konjum Kili	Clara	
1993	Muthupandi	Karpakam	
1993	Kattalai		
1994	Sethupathi IPS	Sathyabhama	
1994	Paasamalargal	Doctor	
1994	Aranmanai Kaavalan	Karpagavalli	
1994	Rasa Magan	Prabhakaran's mother	
1994	Rasigan	Bhagyalakshmi	
1994	Nammavar		
1994	Manju Virattu	Meenakshi	
1994	Sevatha Ponnu	Rasathi	
1995	Kattumarakaran	Rajalakshmi	
1995	Karuppu Nila	Lakshmi	
1995	Paattu Padava	Lakshmi	
1995	Chinna Mani	Pulikesi Thevar's first wife	
1995	Thondan	Singer	
1995	Thai Thangai Paasam		
1995	Avatharam	Advocate	
1995	Thamizhachi		
1995	Ilakkiya Solai		
1995	Tharmangal Sirikkinrana		
1995	Rani Maharani	Kalyani	
1995	Dear Son Maruthu	Parvathi	
1996	Katta Panchayathu	Ponnazhagi Naachiyar	
1996	Minor Mappillai	'Royal' Rajalakshmi	
1996	Vetri Vinayagar	Bhuvaneswari	
1996	Kadhal Desam	Divya's mother	
1996	Senathipathi	Parvathi	
1996	Irattai Roja	Lawyer	
1996	Manikkam		
1997	Kaalamellam Kaathiruppen	Lakshmi	
1997	Ullaasam	Guru's mother	
1997	Ezhumalaiyan Mahimai		
1997	Aahaa..!	Pattammal	
1997	Kadhalukku Mariyadhai	Chandrika	
1998	Kadhala Kadhala	Parvathy	
1998	Kannedhirey Thondrinal		
1998	En Uyir Nee Thaane	Vasu's mother	
1998	Uyirodu Uyiraga	Raji Chandrashekhar	
1998	Kaadhal Kavithai	Sivakami	
1999	Unnai Thedi	Sharadha	
1999	Sangamam	Abhirami's mother	
1999	Dada Darbar		
1999	Nilave Mugam Kaattu	Prabhavathi	
1999	Jodi		
2000	Kannukkul Nilavu	Gautham's mother	
2000	Kandukondain Kandukondain	Padma	
2000	Ilaiyavan		
2001	Sigamani Ramamani		
2001	Aanandham	Ranganayaki	
2001	Star	Vidya	
2002	Kamarasu	Latha	
2002	Thenkasi Pattanam	Devaki	
2002	Shree	Shree's mother	
2002	Sivakami		
2002	Gounder Veetu Maapillai		
2003	Aasai Aasaiyai	Vinod's mother	
2003	Kashmir		
2004	Jana	Devaki	
2005	London	Parvathy	
2022	Yaanai	PRV's first wife	Photo appearance

=== Telugu ===
Year	Title	Role	Notes
1968	Padarasi Peddamna Katha	Dancer	
1972	Tata Manavadu	Dancer	
1973	Nijam Chebite Nammaru		
1974	Bantrotu Bharya		
1974	Gaalipataalu	Susheela	
1975	Ramuni Minchina Ramudu	Latha	
1975	Yashoda Krishna		
1975	Balipeetam		
1975	Kathanayakuni Katha		
1976	Thoorpu Padamara		
1977	Kanyakumari		
1979	Anthuleni Vintha Katha	Vasantha	
1985	Lanchavataram	Sri Vidya	
1988	Nyayaniki Siksha	Sridevi	
1988	Ramudu Bheemudu	Parvathy	
1988	Brahma Puthrudu	Janaki	
1988	Inspector Pratap	Janaki	
1988	Intinti Bhagavatham	Parvati	
1989	Vicky Daada	Justice Srividya	
1989	Dance Master		
1989	Indrudu Chandrudu	Janaki	
1989	Hatya		
1990	Kondaveeti Donga	Justice Sandhya	
1990	Padmavathi Kalyanam		
1991	Sri Yedukondala Swamy		Guest appearance
1992	Balarama Krishnulu	Vasumathi	
1993	Amma Koduku		
1993	Paruvu Pratishta	Rohini	
1993	Bangaru Bullodu	Tulasamma	
1993	Inspector Ashwini		
1993	Rajadhani		
1993	Nakshatra Poratam	Judge	
1994	Gandeevam	Parvathi	
1994	Mugguru Monagallu	Prudhvi's mother	
1996	Dharma Chakram	Sarada	
1997	Chinnabbayi		
1997	Nenu Premisthunnanu		
1997	Thaali	Seetaratnam	
1999	Arundhati		
1999	AK 47	Rajeswari	
2000	Maathalli Gangamma	Goddess Gangamma	
2001	Railway Coolie		
2008	Vijay IPS	Vijay's mother	

=== Kannada ===
Year	Title	Role	Notes
1969	Eradu Mukha		
1969	Shiva Bhaktha		
1977	Geddavalu Naane	Shalini	
1987	Idu Saadhya	Mad lady in hospital	
1988	Suprabhatha	Vijay's sister	
1990	Ashwamedha	Savitri	
1997	Lady Commissioner		
1998	Bhama Sathyabhama		
1999	A. K. 47	Rajeswari	
2000	Nannavalu Nannavalu		
2002	Sainika	Shanta	
2003	Nagabharana		

=== Hindi ===
Year	Title	Role	Notes
1973	Jaise Ko Taisa	Radha	
1976	Arjun Pandit		

=== Singer ===
Year	Film	Song	Composer	Notes
1992	Amaran	"Tring Tring"	Adithyan	
1997	My India	"Jolilo Jimkana"	Adithyan	
