= Dravidan (film) =

- Poster
- Directed by: R. Krishnamoorthy
- Written by: A. L. Narayanan (dialogues)
- Story by: T. Damodaran
- Produced by: Suresh Balaje
- Starring: Sathyaraj; Vidhyashree; Suparna Anand
- Cinematography: Babu
- Edited by: Bhaskaran
- Music by: M. S. Viswanathan
- Production company: Suresh Arts
- Release date: 28 October 1989
- Running time: 145 minutes
- Country: India
- Language: Tamil

Dravidan is a 1989 Indian Tamil-language action film directed by R. Krishnamoorthy, starring Sathyaraj, Vidhyashree and Suparna Anand. It is a remake of the 1988 Malayalam film Aryan. The film was released on 28 October 1989, Diwali day.

== Cast ==
- Sathyaraj
- Vidhyashree
- Suparna Anand
- Jaishankar
- Sharat Saxena
- Jai Ganesh
- Goga Kapoor
- Nalinikanth
- Hareesh
- Monisha Unni
- Nizhalgal Ravi
- S. S. Chandran
- Somayajulu
- Vijayakumar
- Vinu Chakravarthy
- Rajyalakshmi
- Devilalitha
- Srividya

== Soundtrack ==
The music was composed by M. S. Viswanathan, with lyrics by Pulamaipithan.

Track listing
No.	Title	Singer(s)	Length
1.	"Yen Endra Kelvi"	T. M. Soundararajan	5:03
2.	"Anbe Vaa"	Mano, Suja Radhakrishnan	4:45
3.	"Adi Dhool Kelappudhu"	Vani Jairam	4:45
4.	"Netriyil Pottu Ittu"	S. P. Balasubrahmanyam, B. S. Sasirekha, Sunandha	4:37
Total length:			19:10

== Release and reception ==
Dravidan was released on 28 October 1989, Diwali day, alongside another Sathyaraj film Vaathiyaar Veettu Pillai. P. S. S. of Kalki praised the performances of the cast.
