= Chanakyan =

- Promotional poster
- Directed by: T. K. Rajeev Kumar
- Written by: Sab John; T. K. Rajeev Kumar
- Produced by: Navodaya ( a partnership concern)
- Starring: Kamal Haasan; Urmila Matondkar; Jayaram; Thilakan; Madhu
- Cinematography: Saroj Padi
- Edited by: V. N. Raghupathi
- Music by: Mohan Sithara
- Production company: Navodaya (a partnership concern)
- Release date: 1 September 1989
- Country: India
- Language: Malayalam

Chanakyan is a 1989 Indian Malayalam-language thriller film produced by Navodaya and directed by T. K. Rajeev Kumar in his directorial debut. Starring Kamal Haasan, Urmila Matondkar, Jayaram, Madhu, and Thilakan, the film was a critical and commercial success.

== Plot ==
Johnson is a technically skilled person who plots to assassinate the Chief Minister Madhava Menon by using a radio-operated car. But the plan gets botched due to unforeseen circumstances. Later, Johnson happens to watch Jayaram, a mimicry artist mimicking various celebrities' voices and meets him, where he introduces himself as a government agent and asks him to mimic Madhava Menon's voice by recording a bogus Republic Day message filled with fake promises. Later, Johnson uses the tape and replaces the other tape at All India Radio Station in Thiruvananthapuram, which shocks Madhava Menon where he is faced with severe criticism from the party members. Madhava Menon asks his friend, DIG K. Gopalakrishnan Pillai, to investigate the case and nab the suspect. While investigating, Pillai suspects foul play while hearing the broadcast. Jayaram confronts Johnson who reveals his past.

Johnson was in a relationship with Renuka, who is Madhava Menon's daughter. However, their relationship enrages Madhava Menon, and he uses his influence to issue an arrest warrant against Johnson's family under the charges of prostitution. Due to this, his family commits suicide, including Renu, which devastates Johnson. After learning about his past, Jayaram decides to help Johnson in destroying Madhava Menon's political career. They humiliate Madhava Menon's character by broadcasting a televised message and stating outrageous comments regarding the unemployed youngsters (the visuals have been dubbed by Jayaram). The duo also thrust by swindling a large amount of money from a distress relief fund of Madhava Menon by using Menon's mimicked voice. Johnson forces Madhava Menon to shoot him, which he does and Johnson dies. However, the murder is witnessed by the cops, leading to his political career being destroyed.

== Cast ==
- Kamal Haasan as Johnson
- Urmila Matondkar as Renuka
- Jayaram as Jayaram
- Thilakan as Chief Minister Madhava Menon
- Madhu as DIG K. Gopalakrishna Pillai, IPS
- Sithara as Geethu
- Sabitha Anand as Jessy
- Sreeja as Johnson's sister
- Santha Devi as Johnson's mother
- P. C. George as DySP P. C. Soman
- M. S. Thripunithura as Thaazhathu Purackal Veettil Achuthan, Geethu's father
- Jagadish as Tea Shop Owner
- Jagannathan as Madhava Menon's aide
- Poojappura Radhakrishnan as Security guard
- Zainuddin as Mimicry artist
- Kollam Thulasi as Opposition Leader Anantharaman

== Production ==
The film was initially written for Mammootty who was unable to do the film. The role subsequently went to Kamal Haasan who was shooting for Apoorva Sagodharargal in Kochi.

The film marked the first of several collaborations between Jayaram and Kamal Haasan with the pair becoming friends on set. The film also marked the on-screen debut for actress Urmila Matondkar, before she began her career in Bollywood.

== Music ==
1. "Kaalvari Kunnil Kannyasuthan" (Bit)
2. "Music Of Love"
3. "Theme Music"
