= Nakhakshathangal =

- Poster
- Directed by: Hariharan
- Screenplay by: M. T. Vasudevan Nair
- Produced by: Gayathri & Parvathy
- Starring: Monisha; Saleema; Vineeth; P. Jayachandran
- Cinematography: Shaji N. Karun
- Edited by: M. S. Mani
- Music by: Bombay Ravi
- Production company: Gayathri Cinema
- Distributed by: Gayathri Cinema
- Release date: 11 April 1986
- Country: India
- Language: Malayalam

Nakhakshathangal (transl. Bruises of Finger Nails) is a 1986 Indian Malayalam-language film directed by Hariharan, written by M. T. Vasudevan Nair and starring Monisha, Vineeth, and Saleema. Monisha, in her film debut, won the National Film Award for Best Actress. The film was a blockbuster and is more noted for its songs. It was remade in Tamil as Pookkal Vidum Thudhu in 1987, with Monisha reprising her role.

== Plot ==
The story is about Ramu, a 16-year-old boy who is staying with his annoying uncle, who gets angry and often treats Ramu like a slave. On a trip to the pilgrimage town of Guruvayoor with his uncle, Ramu meets 15-year-old Gowri, who has come with her grandmother. Both find love and after sharing a few tender talks and moments, depart without a clue that they will meet again. Once back, Ramu runs away from his uncle and lands in the city with his neighbor Namboothiri. As fate would have it, Ramu and Gowri meet again. The good conduct and intelligence of Ramu get noticed, and he is asked by a lawyer to stay in the house, where Gowri is a maid. The lawyer's deaf and dumb daughter, Lakshmi, gets attracted to Ramu, and the lawyer fixes the marriage without asking Ramu.

Gowri becomes Lakshmi's maid and tries to force Ramu to fall in love with her. Ramu is still in love with Gowri but starts to like Lakshmi and they become good friends. Lakshmi feels a ray of happiness as she has someone to live with forever. Lakshmi and Gowri grow fond of each other with Gowri supporting her relationship with Ramu. One day, Lakshmi's grandmother falls ill and wants the lawyer to promise that he and Lakshmi will not make Ramu disappointed with his relationship with Lakshmi.

Lakshmi is now a bit arrogant to Gowri about her relationship with Ramu as she does not want Gowri to interfere in their relationship. But Gowri wants to stay with Ramu as she loves him very much. Lakshmi, angered at her response, slaps her, and Gowri bursts into tears and runs away. Gowri runs to Ramu upset and he too becomes unsettled at how she treated Gowri and the arrangements of his marriage with Lakshmi. Lakshmi see them embracing each other in sadness without them knowing, and she is so infuriated by the fact that Ramu loves Gowri more than her. She begins to destroy some of the things in her room, is very sad, and begins to cry in her bedroom. Gowri comes into her room, sees what she has done, and finds a note on the desk saying that "Lakshmi is a fool".

Ramu finally tells the lawyer that he doesn't like his arrangement for him to marry Lakshmi. The lawyer is sad and tells him that Lakshmi really loves him. But Ramu loves Gowri and soon Ramu becomes very depressed. Lakshmi, who is sad, soon is ashamed of her actions toward Gowri.

Lakshmi goes and sits on the steps near a waterhole where she sees Gowri washing some clothes. Both of them stare at each other for a little bit, Lakshmi walks to Gowri. Gowri is reluctant to look at her, but she turns anyway and Lakshmi apologises for being mean. Gowri forgives her and embraces Lakshmi. Lakshmi cries in her arms. Lakshmi writes on one of the walls to not hate her, leaving Gowri in deep sadness. She says that she will make Ramu agree to marry Lakshmi and that she doesn't want a life by hurting Lakshmi. They both look for Ramu but he isn't in his room. Lakshmi finds a note on her desk. It was a suicide note from Ramu, saying that he committed suicide by getting run over by a train. Lakshmi is shocked and saddened by the loss of Ramu. She gives the note to Gowri. She is upset by Ramu's death and they both mourn his loss outside Lakshmi's house, looking at each other for support.

== Cast ==
- Monisha as Gowri (Voiceover by Ambili(Dubbing Artist))
- Vineeth as Ramu
- Saleema as Lakshmi
- Thilakan as Hariharan, Ramu's uncle
- Kaviyoor Ponnamma
- Jayachandran as Neighbor Namboothiri
- Jagannatha Varma as Advocate Bhaskaran Nair
- Kuthiravattam Pappu as Kanaran, Cook
- Bahadoor as Shivankutty

== Soundtrack ==
The songs became even more popular than the film and are still popular. K. S. Chithra got her second National Film Award for Best Female Playback Singer for the song "Manjal Prasadavum". Among the five songs in the film, three (except those sung by P. Jayachandran, who also played a role in the film) were composed in raga Mohanam.

All lyrics are written by O. N. V. Kurup; all music is composed by Bombay Ravi.

No.	Title	Artist(s)	Length
1.	"Aareyum Bhaava"	K. J. Yesudas, Chorus
2.	"Kevala Marthya"	P. Jayachandran
3.	"Manjal Prasaadavum"	K. S. Chithra
4.	"Neeraaduvaan Nilayil"	K. J. Yesudas
5.	"Vreelaa Bharithayaay"	P. Jayachandran

== Awards ==
National Film Awards

- Best Actress – Monisha
- Best Female Playback Singer – K. S. Chithra for the song "Manjalprasadavum"

Kerala State Film Awards

- Best Lyricist – O. N. V. Kurup
- Best Music Director – Ravi Bombay
- Best Male Playback Singer – K. J. Yesudas
- Best Female Playback Singer – K. S. Chithra

Kerala Film Critics Association Awards

- Best Lyricist – O. N. V. Kurup
- Best Music Director – Ravi Bombay
- Best Male Playback Singer – K. J. Yesudas
- Best Female Playback Singer – K. S. Chithra
