= Season (film) =

- Poster
- Directed by: Padmarajan
- Written by: Padmarajan
- Produced by: M. G. Gopinath (Pandalam Gopinath)
- Starring: Mohanlal; Gavin Packard
- Cinematography: Venu
- Edited by: B. Lenin; V. T. Vijayan (Assistant)
- Music by: Ilaiyaraaja
- Production company: Shanthi Cine Arts
- Distributed by: Thomsun Films
- Release date: 31 March 1989
- Country: India
- Language: Malayalam

Season is a 1989 Indian Malayalam-language action thriller film written and directed by Padmarajan. It stars Mohanlal and Gavin Packard. The story is set at Kovalam beach in Kerala and Poojappura Central Prison, Thiruvananthapuram. The score was composed by Ilaiyaraaja.

Season is considered ahead of its time and has a cult status in Malayalam cinema. Often cited as one of the finest crime thrillers in Malayalam.

== Plot ==
Jeevan is taken to central jail from the court. It is the year 1988. In his own words, "My name is Jeevan. I feel so depressed to know that I can't see this dew morning and the street lamps for years; but little would benefit in regretting now".

The story moves back to 1982, at Kovalam, where Jeevan is running a restaurant. He also is involved in the sale and purchase of several, smuggled foreign goods along with transfer of foreign currency. Popularly and fondly called by everyone as "Uncle", Jeevan is one of the richest businessmen in Kovalam, and has no bad vices. He is a real mystery to all, as he also keeps everyone away from his personal life. Porinju and Kanthi, two jobless youths, are involved in small-time drug business to make ends meet. Both have their own families and personal issues and dream of being rich one day.

They happen to meet Fabien, a European tourist, who wants them to fetch him three kilos of heroin. Both Porinju and Kanthi get lured into this deal. Jeevan supports them by lending ₹1.5 lakhs, on the condition that they will give up the drug trade after the deal is closed. Both Porinju and Kanthi leave for Goa. They return a week later at night with the stuff. They directly go to the restaurant run by Jeevan and inform him about it. Jeevan warns them to be careful. Fabien is informed about the stuff and asked to arrive at the lighthouse late, in the light. At the lighthouse, Fabien plays foul and shoots down Porinju. Meanwhile, Merlin, the girlfriend of Fabien breaks into the Jeevan's place and steals around four lakhs rupees along with gold. On getting the information, Jeevan comes to the house, but finds it completely ransacked. Kanthi, who escaped from Fabien reaches Jeevan and informs him about the death of Porinju. He takes Jeevan to the hut where Fabien was staying with Merlin. But Fabien had within the time escaped with the currency and drugs. He had even jilted Merlin. She was assaulted and left back.

Jeevan finds her with both hands and legs tied. She informs him that Fabien is already on his way and they won't be able to chase him. She also informs that he is a psychopathic killer. Kanthi takes Jeevan's car and leaves to chase Fabien, but is killed on the way by him. The next day, the police recover the bodies of Porinju and Kanthi. Jeevan is shocked to find that Merlin has also committed suicide by taking sleeping pills. Jeevan is the main suspect as Kanthi's body was found in his car and Merlin was found dead in his house. He is arrested and sentenced to 7 years in prison, but the prosecution couldn't nail him for the murders of Porinju and Kanthi as there were no proofs. He gets a 5-year jail term for the death of Merlin. It has been just weeks before his release that Fabien enters his jail. Jeevan agrees to help Fabien in escaping from jail, if he pays ₹5 lakhs. After the release, Jeevan plans everything and is back in jail for a petty crime. His sole aim is to finish off Fabien.

The film then cuts to the present. On the day of Gandhi Jayanti, when, all the cops are busy with the celebrations, Jeevan escapes from jail with Fabien. On their way, Fabien collects ₹5 lakhs from an agent and pays it to Jeevan. After collecting the amount, Jeevan reveals his true face to Fabien and in a fiery fight he finishes him off. Jeevan goes back to jail when his voice over comes in background with the visual of him driving the van and images of passing street lights in the plain glass of the van "I am getting sad to know that I am going to miss these street lights again. I had great comfort when she (one of his friend's lovers) accepted the money (that Jeevan took from Fabien) and the happy thing for me is that this time they won't have any circumstantial evidences against me; but only evidence, the real evidence. It's on my shirt, on my face, on my hands...and everywhere ". He smiles triumphantly and reaches back at the prison. When the cops ask about Fabien, Jeevan walks with a winning smile and opens the door of the van where the cops find Fabien's corpse.

== Cast ==
- Mohanlal as Jeevan
- Gavin Packard as Fabien Ramirez
- Maniyanpilla Raju as Kanthi
- Ashokan as Porinju
- Shari as Indira
- Leena Nair as Merlin Simon
- Jagathy Sreekumar as Sathyan
- Sivaji
- Thodupuzha Vasanthi as Salomi
- Thilakan as Hari, Kanthi's Father
- Azeez as Jailor Anwar Rowther
- Prem Prakash as man coming to buy the TV
- Valsala Menon as lady coming to buy the TV
- Oduvil Unnikrishnan as Thirumeni
- Santhakumari as Porinchu's Mother
- Krishna Prasad as Housekeeper

== Soundtrack ==
All songs composed by Ilaiyaraaja. Lyrics were penned by Sreekumaran Thampi.

1. "Swapnangal than theyyam" – KS Chithra
2. "Poyvaroo" – P Jayachandran, P Padmarajan

== Production ==
The film was shot in Kovalam and Poojapura Central Jail, Thiruvananthapuram District, Kerala.

== Reception ==
The New Indian Express wrote, "This movie was way ahead of its time. In other words, it was the Double Barrel (2015) of the 80s - too early for the people to digest. Almost 20 years before Lal Jose and Sreenivasan introduced a foreigner as a central character in Arabikkatha (2007), Padmarajan did that in this movie. Season might be among his least creative works, but it is still amazing that he had foreseen the fortunes and (at times) deathtraps that the youth of God's Own Country were going to embrace through the tourism sector"
