= Souhrudam =

1991 film by Shaji Kailas

- Directed by: Shaji Kailas
- Written by: Kaloor Dennis
- Starring: Mukesh; Urvashi; Parvathy; Sai Kumar
- Cinematography: Saroj Padi
- Edited by: L. Bhoominathan
- Music by: Shyam
- Release date: 1991
- Country: India
- Language: Malayalam

Souhrudam (transl. Friendship) is a 1991 Indian Malayalam language family comedy drama film directed by Shaji Kailas and written by Kaloor Dennis. The film stars Mukesh, Urvashi, Sai Kumar and Parvathy. The film has musical score by Shyam.

== Plot ==
The story is about two newly wed couples living as neighbours. While the wives are close friends, husbands suspect that their wives have an extramarital affair with the other husband.

== Cast ==
- Mukesh as Roychen
- Urvashi as Shainy Roy
- Parvathy as Sreedevi Rajmohan
- Sai Kumar as Rajmohan
- V. D. Rajappan as Narayanan
- Kanakalatha as Mrs. Menon
- Jagathi Sreekumar as Mathachan
- Kalpana as Annamma
- Baiju as Reji
- Sukumaran as Adv James Samuel
- Adoor Bhavani as Karthiyaniamma
- Jagannatha Varma
- Jagannathan as Krishnan
- Kollam Thulasi
- Philomina as Kathrina Chedathi
- Saritha as Annie James Samuel
- Kunchan as Broker Sunderashan
- Praseetha Menon as Sreelakshmi
- Mamukkoya as Usthad Usman

== Soundtrack ==
The music was composed by Shyam and the lyrics were written by Chunakkara Ramankutty.

No.	Song	Singers	Lyrics	Length (m:ss)
1	"Oru Shilpagopurathil"	K. J. Yesudas	Chunakkara Ramankutty	
2	"Swarloka Naayakan"	K. J. Yesudas, P. Jayachandran, Chorus, Sindhu	Chunakkara Ramankutty	
