= Vandanam =

- Poster
- Directed by: Priyadarshan
- Written by: V. R. Gopalakrishnan
- Based on: Stakeout by John Badham
- Produced by: P. K. R. Pillai
- Starring: Mohanlal; Girija Shettar; Nedumudi Venu; Mukesh
- Cinematography: S. Kumar
- Edited by: N. Gopalakrishnan
- Music by: Songs: Ouseppachan; Score: Johnson
- Production company: Shirdi Sai Creations
- Distributed by: Shirdi Sai Films
- Release date: 14 May 1989
- Running time: 182 minutes
- Country: India
- Language: Malayalam

Vandanam (transl. Greeting) is a 1989 Indian Malayalam-language film directed by Priyadarshan, written by V. R. Gopalakrishnan, and produced by P. K. R. Pillai. The film stars Mohanlal and Girija Shettar, while Mukesh and Nedumudi Venu appear in supporting roles. The songs were composed by Ouseppachan, while the background score was by Johnson. The film is based on the 1987 American film Stakeout.

Priyadarshan remade the film in Telugu as Nirnayam (1991) with Sukumari reprising her role.. A comedy sequence from this movie was reported to be re-used by Priyadarshan in the 2021 Hindi film Hungama 2.

== Plot ==
Professor Kurian Fernandez, a convict, escapes from jail along with Raghu, his cellmate. After a failed attempt to chase and nab the duo, the officials draw up several plans to capture both. Police authorities strongly feel that Fernandez will go to Bangalore and may try to meet up with his only daughter, Gaadha. Unnikrishnan and Purushothaman Nair, two inspectors from Kerala Police, are sent to Bangalore to covertly observe Gaadha to see if Fernandez makes contact.

Upon reaching Bangalore, Unnikrishnan meets Peter, his college mate, who is also now an inspector with Karnataka Police. Unnikrishnan and Peter make up a team and sideline Purushothaman, who struggles to cope up with the Kannada language. The police team stay at an apartment opposite one where Gaadha lives. Gaadha works at an advertisement agency as a copy writer and stays with Maggie aunty as a paying guest. Unnikrishnan and Peter are more interested in drinking, playing cards and having fun rather than investigating. Purushothaman tries to report this, but fails each time. Unnikrishnan slowly develops a crush on Gaadha. He tries to woo her in multiple ways, including befriending Maggie aunty. Eventually they become friends.

Meanwhile, the police find out that Fernandez is in the city and is in touch with Gaadha. Unnikrishnan decides to use Gaadha to reach out to Fernandez. Gaadha tells him about Fernandez's past, when he was a much loved college professor. He questions the college authorities on many administration malpractices, which made him their target. He rallies the students against the offenders who had political connections as well as the police commissioner on their side. In retaliation, professor Fernandez and a female student, Mercy, are brutally attacked one night after a college event. Mercy was raped and later committed suicide and the professor was falsely convicted in the case.

Unnikrishnan, with the help of Gaadha, tries to convince the professor to give up his plans for revenge but is unable to do so. Meanwhile, Gaadha gets an opportunity to work abroad. She now reciprocates Unni's affection and even meets his mother.

The professor starts his revenge by killing the sons of the commissioner and the MP and the dishonest lawyer, who had fabricated the evidence during the rape trial. He then decides to bomb the city stadium during a football match. Raghu, alarmed by the professors' deteriorating mental equilibrium, decides to leave but is killed. Fernandez plants the bomb in the stadium, but the police corner and trap him before he can set it off. Unnikrishnan successfully defuses the bomb and saves the lives of thousands.

News of the bomb is leaked to the public and the professor escapes in the ensuing chaos. He then fatally stabs the MP, and is finally captured by the police. Unnikrishnan also rescues Gaadha from the police, who had captured her on the orders of the commissioner. To save her from the future actions of the commissioner, Unni and Gaadha decide to leave for Kerala together to get married. However, circumstances keep them apart and unable to communicate with each other. The film ends on a sad note with both stopped at a traffic light in separate cars but unaware of each other and then taking different roads when the light turns green.

== Cast ==
- Mohanlal as SI Unnikrishnan (Unni)
- Girija Shettar as Gaadha Fernandez, Unnikrishnan's love interest (Voice dubbed by Bhagyalakshmi)
- Mukesh as SI Peter Kallikal, Unnikrishnan's friend
- Nedumudi Venu as Professor Kurian Fernandez, Gaadha's father
- Jagadish as SI K. Purushothaman Nair (K. P. Nair)
- Maniyanpilla Raju as Hariharan Iyer, Gaadha's boss
- K. B. Ganesh Kumar as Raghu, Fernandez's jailmate and helper
- M. G. Soman as City Police Commissioner Chandrasekharan IPS
- Janardhanan as MP Ramachandran
- Cochin Haneefa as Samad, MP's lawyer
- Sukumari as Margaret Anthony Rodriguez / Maggie Aunty, Gaadha's guardian
- Kaviyoor Ponnamma as Unnikrishnan's mother
- Saleema as Mercy, Fernandez's student and orphan
- Sulakshana as Lakshmi, Fernandez's friend and aide
- Thikkurissy Sukumaran Nair as businessman
- Kuthiravattam Pappu as Ivan Anthony Rodriguez, Maggie Aunty's son
- Kunchan as SI Innasappa
- Pavithran as MP's son

== Production ==
Girija Shettar was chosen for the role after Priyadarshan watched her in Geethanjali. This was her only Malayalam film released, as her second film Dhanushkodi, directed by Priyadarshan, starring Mohanlal and Raghuvaran was shelved.

== Soundtrack ==
The songs of this film were composed by Ouseppachan, with lyrics penned by Shibu Chakravarthy except "Thillana" which is a composition of M. Balamuralikrishna. Sujatha Mohan received the Kerala Film Critics Association Award for Best Female Playback Singer for her renditions in this film.

Track	Song title	Singer(s)	Raga
1	"Theeram Thedum"	M. G. Sreekumar, Sujatha, Chorus	Natta
2	"Kavilinayil"	M. G. Sreekumar, Sujatha, Ouseppachan	
3	"Anthiponvettam"	M. G. Sreekumar, Sujatha, Chorus	Madhyamavathi
4	"Meghangale"	Nedumudi Venu, Sujatha	Mohanam
5	"Thillana"	M. G. Sreekumar	Brindavani
6	"Anthiponvettam"	M. G. Sreekumar, Chorus	Madhyamavati

== Reception ==
Vandanam didn't perform well at the box office. Despite this, it was remade in Telugu as Nirnayam by Priyadarshan himself. However, the film went on to achieve cult status in the years following its release.

== Accolades ==
Sujatha Mohan won Kerala Film Critics Association Award for Best Female Playback Singer.
