= Champakulam Thachan =

1992 Indian film

- Poster
- Directed by: Kamal
- Written by: Sreenivasan
- Produced by: V. P. Madhavan Nair
- Starring: Madhu; Vineeth; Murali; Nedumudi Venu; Rambha; Monisha; Sreenivasan
- Cinematography: Saloo George
- Edited by: K. Rajagopal
- Music by: Raveendran
- Production company: Murali Films
- Distributed by: Murali Films
- Release date: 1992
- Country: India
- Language: Malayalam

Champakulam Thachan (transl. Carpenter of Champakulam) is a 1992 Indian Malayalam-language drama film directed by Kamal and written by Sreenivasan, based on the Shakespearean tragedy Othello. The film stars Madhu, Vineeth, Murali, Monisha, Rambha and Nedumudi Venu. The music and background score was composed by Raveendran.

== Cast ==
- Madhu as Valiya Ashari
- Murali as Raghavan
- Vineeth as Chanthutti
- Nedumudi Venu as Kuttiraman
- Jagathy Sreekumar as Rajappan
- Monisha as Ammu
- Rambha as Devi
- K.R.Vijaya
- Sreenivasan as Bhargavan
- Riza Bava as Thommikunju
- Jose Pellissery as Vakkachen

== Soundtrack ==
Music: Raveendran, Lyrics: Bichu Thirumala

- "Champakulam Thachan" - K. J. Yesudas, M. G. Sreekumar
- "Chellam" - K. J. Yesudas, K. S. Chitra
- "Makale Paathimalare" (D) - K. J. Yesudas, Lathika
- "Makale Paathimalare" (F) - K. S. Chitra
- "Olikkunnuvo" - K. J. Yesudas
