= Pookkal Vidum Thudhu =

- Theatrical release poster
- Directed by: Sreedhar Rajan
- Screenplay by: T. Rajendar
- Based on: Nakhakshathangal by M. T. Vasudevan Nair
- Produced by: Sreedhar Rajan
- Starring: Monisha; Srividya; Hariharan
- Cinematography: Soumendu Roy
- Edited by: T. R. Sekar
- Music by: T. Rajendar
- Production company: Sri Sivahari Films
- Distributed by: Simbu Cine Arts
- Release date: 21 October 1987
- Country: India
- Language: Tamil

Pookkal Vidum Thudhu (/θuːðu/ transl. The message sent by the flowers) is a 1987 Indian Tamil-language teen romance film produced and directed by Sreedhar Rajan, and written by T. Rajendar who also composed the music. A remake of the Malayalam film Nakhakshathangal (1986), it stars Monisha (reprising her role from the original), Srividya and Hariharan. The film was released on 21 October 1987.

== Plot ==
Hari escapes from the clutches of his domineering uncle and finds shelter at the house of Kalaivani. He falls in love with Kalaivani's maid Gowri, but Kalaivani's deaf-mute daughter also loves him.

== Cast ==
- Monisha as Gowri
- Srividya as Kalaivani
- Hariharan as Hari
- Goundamani as Dharmadurai
- Janagaraj as Murugesan
- Senthil as Manmadha
- Vennira Aadai Moorthy as the film producer

== Production ==
Pookkal Vidum Thudhu, a remake of the Malayalam film Nakhakshathangal (1986), is the third and final film directed by Sreedhar Rajan. Monisha, the lead actress of the original, repeated her role. Lead actor Hariharan's voice was dubbed by Ravishankar Devanarayanan.

== Soundtrack ==
The music was composed by T. Rajendar who also wrote the lyrics. The song "Kadhiravanai Paarthu" is set in the Carnatic raga Bowli.

Track listing
| No. | Title | Singer(s) | Length |
|---|---|---|---|
| 1. | "Kadhiravanai Paarthu" | K. J. Yesudas | 4:51 |
| 2. | "Idamana Raagam" | P. Susheela | 4:53 |
| 3. | "Moongil Katoram" (male) | S. P. Balasubrahmanyam | 4:38 |
| 4. | "Poovum Poovum" | Mano | 4:31 |
| 5. | "Ilanjittu" | Malaysia Vasudevan | 4:51 |
| 6. | "Moongil Katoram" (sad) | S. P. Balasubrahmanyam | 1:35 |
| 7. | "Paadu Paattu" | K. S. Chithra | 1:17 |
| 8. | "Moongil Katoram" (duet) | K. S. Chithra, S. P. Balasubrahmanyam | 3:20 |
| 9. | "Kaalkal Yeruthu" | S. P. Balasubrahmanyam | 4:43 |
| Total length: | | | 34:39 |

== Release and reception ==
Pookkal Vidum Thudhu was released on 21 October 1987, during Diwali, and distributed by Simbu Cine Arts. The Indian Express wrote that the film was "swamp[ed]" with an "extravagant assortment of comedians" and an "indiscriminate flurry of songs that take the film nowhere in particular", although the critic said Monisha had "the advantage of being a newface in Tamil films" and Hariharan was "cast well for playing a delicate role. Srividya as his benefactress sparkles in a few scenes". Despite facing competition from other Diwali releases including Manithan and Nayakan, it was well received by the audience.
