= Hrudayanjali =

- Directed by: A. Raghurami Reddy
- Written by: B.K.Easwar
- Produced by: A. Raghurami Reddy; P. Ramanadh
- Starring: Sanjay Mitra; Girija Shettar
- Cinematography: Madhu Ambat
- Edited by: Karunanidhi
- Music by: L. Vaidyanathan
- Distributed by: Siva Sivani Films
- Release date: 2002
- Running time: 168 minutes
- Country: India
- Language: Telugu
- Budget: 15,00,000
- Box office: 25,00,000

Hrudayanjali is a 2002 Indian Telugu-language romance film directed by A. Raghurami Reddy. The film was completed in 1992 but was released in 2002 and won three Nandi awards. The film was released to negative reception due to the delay.

== Plot ==
The movie begins with an interview of a celebrated actor Anand (Sanjay Mitra) by Maya (Girija). It is one of those magical moments when love is in the air.

Anand notices that for some mysterious reason, Maya, in spite of being in deep love with him, is not ready to marry him. Whenever he proposes marriage, she says that she is not eligible to marry him. One fine day she gives in to his pestering and tells him the facts of her life.

We flashback to when Maya was 16 years old. Back from school, one day she sees her uncle waiting alone for her at home. He forces himself upon her, and in doing so leaves a permanent scar in her mind.

Anand offers to marry her. They marry. Then there is a series of letdowns for Anand, since Maya will not let him have her. One day, after a major letdown, unable to bear the depression, Maya commits suicide.

== Cast ==
- Sanjay Mitra as Anand
- Girija Shettar as Maya

== Soundtrack ==
1. Oohalalo Korikalu - S. Janaki
2. Hrudayanjalilo -
3. Sangamam Mana Sangamam -
4. Adharam Nee Adharam -
5. Alakinchu Priyathama -
6. Naa Matalo Nee Talapulu -
7. See Life As Love -

== Reception ==
Gudipoodi Srihari of The Hindu wrote that "The film continues on a tiring level duly earning negative reaction from the audience. Some were found commenting, "Who gave Nandi award to this film"?" A critic from Full Hyderabad wrote that "If Hrudayanjali had meant "the desire to move to a remote island with a bottle of cyanide as your only friend", the movie fits the bill and succeeds beyond all expectation".

== Awards ==
Nandi Awards

- Best Cinematography - Madhu Ambat
- Best Sctreenplay Writer - A. Raghu Rami Reddy
- Third Best Feature Film - Bronze - P. Ramanath
