= Njan Gandharvan =

1991 Indian film directed by P. Padmarajan

- Promotional Poster
- Directed by: P. Padmarajan
- Written by: P. Padmarajan
- Produced by: R. Mohan
- Starring: Nitish Bharadwaj; Suparna Anand
- Cinematography: Venu
- Edited by: B. Lenin
- Music by: Johnson
- Production company: GoodKnight Films
- Distributed by: Manorajyam Release
- Release date: 11 January 1991
- Running time: 136 minutes
- Country: India
- Language: Malayalam

Njan Gandharvan (transl. I am Gandharva) is a 1991 Indian Malayalam-language romantic fantasy film written and directed by P. Padmarajan. It stars Nitish Bharadwaj and Suparna Anand in lead roles. The film is an esoteric fantasy about a girl and her passion for a gandharva, who keeps appearing from a wooden statue that she found on a beach but is invisible to others.

During the time of its release, it was a box office failure, with purists taking offense to the aesthetically shot intimate scenes. Later, the film has developed a cult following for various reasons, ranging from its aesthetics to its storytelling. The challenges faced during the production of the movie and director Padmarajan's untimely death just after the release contributed heavily to the 'gandharva curse', a superstition that films made about gandharvas brings bad luck to the ones involved.

== Plot ==
On a study tour, Bhama, a final-year degree student, finds a wooden sculpture on the beach. She finds it beautiful and decides to keep it. The same night in her hotel room, when all her friends have gone for dinner, Bhama takes it out and keeps it on her bed. The sculpture magically turns into a young man, who passionately kisses Bhama. Bhama is attracted to him, but he vanishes. At her study leave, while preparing for examinations, Bhama again feels his presence. She moves towards a tree but is stunned to find a beautiful blue butterfly. She hears his voice in the air, introducing himself as a gandharva who has developed a particular liking for her. At her request, he appears in front of her like a normal man. The gandharva asks her to call him Devan and she falls in love with him.

Nitish Bharadwaj and Suparna Anand in a scene from the film Njan Gandharvan.

Bhama asks her grandmother about gandharvas. Gandharvas, according to Hindu mythology, are celestial musicians and Soma providers in Devaloka, and are destined to entertain devas and lords. They are born from the sweat (or breath) of Lord Brahma and have no death, with the ability to change forms and appear anywhere at will. When gandharvas commit crimes, they are cursed to roam the earth for several kalpas, inhabiting Paala trees, seducing mortal women and stealing their virginity before abandoning them. Bhama asks Devan if he would ever desert her, to which he replies that he is just a slave of Lord Indra and has no power to remember the past once he leaves the earth. But Devan assures her that he will stay back and would never return to Devaloka. Devan hands her a diamond named Rudhiraksham, which is holy and divine. He adds that whenever she feels like seeing him, she just has to kiss it.

Meanwhile, Pradeep, Bhama's fiancé, is desperately trying to woo her, and she flatly refuses. He finds Devan and Bhama together at restaurants and parks, which he reports to her mother. One day, Devan makes a surprise visit to Bhama's house and stuns her. With his magical talent in music, he wins the hearts of both her mother and her grandmother. Both now are willing to see her married to him.

Everything seems to be going fine, when one evening, Devan loses his voice. A voice speaks to Devan from the fallen branch of the Paala tree, whose sap starts to bring forth blood, warning him that he has broken the laws of Devaloka and that he is to be punished for his crimes by Chitraradhan, who is the king of the celestial city of the gandharvas. Devan and Bhama frantically try to run away from the situation but in vain. As he is about to be taken away from Bhama, Devan motions to Bhama to not summon him with the holy Rudhiraksham again. A lost and gloomy Bhama pines for her beloved in the forthcoming period, which worries her family, making them agree to her marrying Devan, assuming that would make her happy. However, when her father asks her to request Devan to bring his parents so that their marriage may be fixed, Bhama finds herself in a quandary. Left without a choice, she is forced to violate Devan's warning and summon him with the Rudhiraksham. Devan does not appear before her; instead, Bhama perceives the terrible lashes that are being meted out as punishment to the gandharvan.

More than a week passes, and one night Bhama finds, to her joy, that Devan has returned to her. Devan informs Bhama that he had to undergo cruel tortures in the halls of Chitraradhan's celestial palace for seven nights and seven days. While gandharva is not supposed to come in daylight and is not permitted to meet human beings other than his lover, Devan had broken the law by appearing in public and singing songs for others.

Suddenly, strong winds blow at the couple. As the winds die down, a burning celestial handcuff falls onto Devan's forearm and as he painfully manages to remove it, the Divine Creator and the gandharvas' celestial father, Lord Brahma, speaks to the gandharvan, informing him that he and his crimes, which includes his persistence in desiring the lowly mortality of earth, have once again been discovered. Lord Brahma also warns him that the harsh punishments of Indra, lord of the devas, await him in Naraka (hell), including having to embrace and sleep with molten hot female figurines, each one representing a moment he spends with Bhama that night, among other tortures in hells filled with snakes, poisoned spears and floors slipping with blood. Lord Brahma informs his son that he is now forbidden from all sunlit days and moonlit nights for all time to come and that the holy Rudhiraksham which he had given Bhama will turn into powerless white dust, which Bhama immediately confirms to be true, to her utter horror. The only way for him to alleviate some of the gravity of his punishment is to take Bhama's virginity from her before the Seventeenth Wind of the Night comes to take him to hell, thus erasing both their mutual memories forever, and failing which, Brahma tells Devan, he will be sentenced to turn into a hideous, foul-smelling beast, neither human nor gandharva, roaming around for a billion kalpas. Devan decides to refuse his Divine Father's advice, and prepares to welcome his terrible fate. Bhama advises him to leave her and go back, so that he will not have to undergo the severe tortures of Indra. She also wants to give up her virginity to him, for although Devan's memories are her most valued possession, she wants to sacrifice them in order to save him and to not have to bear the continued perception of his cruel tortures which would otherwise haunt her throughout her life. They indulge in a physical relationship that night, which she considers the most valuable gift that she can have from him. The night fades away and the heavy Seventeenth Wind of the Night comes in. When the wind moves away, Devan slowly vanishes and Bhama is shown weeping and looking far away.

== Cast ==
- Nitish Bharadwaj as Devan, the Gandharvan (celestial lover)
- Suparna Anand as Bhama
- Philomina as Bhama's grandmother
- M.G. Soman as Gopalakrishnan Nair, Bhama's father
- Ganeshan as Pradeep, Bhama's fiancé
- Vinduja Menon as Bhama's sister
- Thesni Khan as Bhama's friend
- Sulakshana as Bhama's Mother
- Narendra Prasad - voice of Lord Brahma
- P. Padmarajan - voice behind the tree

Crew

=== Voice - artists ===
Artist	Actor/Actress
Nandakumar	Nitish Bharadwaj
Ambili	Suparna Anand
Anandavally	Sulakshana
Sreeja	Vinduja Menon /Thesni Khan

== Soundtrack ==
Njan Gandharvan

Soundtrack album by Johnson
- Released: January 1991
- Recorded: 1990
- Genre: Feature film soundtrack
- Language: Malayalam
- Label: Tharangini Records

The film's songs were composed by Johnson with lyrics penned by Kaithapram Damodaran Namboothiri.

#	Song	Singer(s)	Ragam
1	"Devanganangal"	K. J. Yesudas	Yaman, Puriya Dhanashree
2	"Paalapoove"	K. S. Chithra	Kapi
3	"Devi Aathmaragam"	K. J. Yesudas	Miyan ki Malhar

== Reception ==
When released, the film got a cold response, which made Padmarajan very upset. He had very high aspirations for the movie, and the response shook him hard. Within a week of its release, Padmarajan died at a hotel in Kozhikode. K. S. Chithra won the Kerala State Award in 1990 for Best Female Playback Singer for the song "Palapoove"

Later on, the movie achieved cult status and is now widely appreciated for its theme, direction, portrayal of romance, aesthetic value, and use of music. Film critic Kozhikodan included the film on his list of the 10 best Malayalam movies of all time.
