= Vaathiyaar Veettu Pillai =

- Poster
- Directed by: P. Vasu
- Written by: P. Vasu
- Produced by: M. Ramanathan
- Starring: Sathyaraj; Shobana
- Cinematography: A. Sabapathy
- Edited by: P. Mohanraj
- Music by: Ilaiyaraaja
- Production company: Raaj Films International
- Release date: 28 October 1989
- Country: India
- Language: Tamil

Vaathiyaar Veettu Pillai (transl. Son from Teacher's house) is a 1989 Indian Tamil-language film, directed by P. Vasu. It stars Sathyaraj and Shobana. This was Sathyaraj's 100th film as an actor. Vaathiyaar Veettu Pillai was released on 28 October 1989, alongside another Sathyaraj film Dravidan. It was commercially unsuccessful. The film was a remake of the Kannada film Nammoora Raja for which Vasu wrote the story.

== Plot ==
A corrupt landlord's plan of constructing a chemical factory is foiled by Thangaraj. Things take a turn when Thangaraj falls in love with the landlord's daughter. Thangaraj's family gets affected by the landlord. The rest of the film revolves how Thangaraj thwarts the plans of the landlord and saves his family.

== Cast ==
- Sathyaraj as Thangaraj
- Shobana as Geeta
- Raasi as Gowri
- Rajesh as Gowri's father
- Goundamani as Chinna Muthu
- Nassar as Gowri's husband
- Srividya as Gowri's mother
- Bheeman Raghu as Periya Muthu
- Mohan Natarajan as Doctor
- Chandranath
- Annapurna

== Soundtrack ==
The music was composed by Ilaiyaraaja.

Song	Singers	Lyrics	Length
"Annana Vittu"	S. P. Balasubrahmanyam	Vaali	04:31
"Chikkunnu Irukku"	S. P. Balasubrahmanyam, K. S. Chithra	Piraisoodan	04:27
"Manamaalaiyum Manjalum"	S. P. Balasubrahmanyam	Pulamaipithan	04:32
"Oru Pooncholai"	S. P. Balasubrahmanyam, K. S. Chithra	Muthulingam	05:12
"Thaiyarae Thaiyarae"	Malaysia Vasudevan	Gangai Amaran	04:28
"Vaathiyaru Veetu"	Ilaiyaraaja	Ilaiyaraaja	04:00
"Vazhkayilae Kashtapattu"	S. P. Balasubrahmanyam	Ilaiyaraaja	04:42

== Release and reception ==
Vaathiyaar Veettu Pillai was released on 28 October 1989, alongside another Sathyaraj film Dravidan. P. S. S. of Kalki lamented the fact that Sathyaraj's 100th film was underwhelming. The film was a box office failure.
