= Sanjay Mitra (actor) =

Indian television actor (born 1966)

- Born: 1 March 1966 (age 60); Mumbai, Maharashtra, India
- Occupation: Actor
- Years active: 1988–2008
- Spouses: Suparna Anand (m. 1997; div. 2008) Taruna Mitra (m. 2010)
- Children: 2

Sanjay Mitra (born 1 March 1966) is an Indian actor who appears in Malayalam, Hindi, Bengali, and Telugu films.

== Personal life ==
He married Suparna Anand, his co-star in Vaishali in 1997. They have two sons, Manav Mitra (1999) and Bhavya Mitra (2001). They divorced in 2008 and Sanjay then married Taruna Mitra in 2010.

== Career ==
He made his debut with the Malayalam film Vaishali, along with Suparna Anand. Years later, Mitra appeared in the Malayalam film Poonilamazha. His Telugu film Hrudayanjali had a delayed release in 2002 and received critical acclaim.

== Filmography ==
| Year | Movie | Role | Notes |
|---|---|---|---|
| 1988 | Vaishali | Rishyasringa | Malayalam |
| 1989 | Oru Vadakkan Veeragatha | Aaromalunni | Malayalam |
| 1991 | Ananda Niketan | | Bengali |
| 1991 | Amma Kadapu Challanga | | Telugu |
| 1993 | Shabnam | | Hindi |
| 1996 | Chal Kanwariya Shiv Ke Dham | | Hindi |
| 1997 | Poonilamazha | Manohar Varma | Malayalam |
| 2002 | Hrudayanjali | Anand | Telugu |
| 2006 | Smart City | Sunil Kottooran | Malayalam |

== Television ==
| Year | Serial | Role | Channel |
|---|---|---|---|
| 2001–2003 | Gharana | Amit Somani | Zee TV |
| 2002 | C.I.D. – The Case Of The Invisible Bullet: Part 1 & Part 2 | Mahesh (Episode 229 & Episode 230) | Sony Entertainment Television |
| 2003 | Vishwaas | Sanjay | Zee TV |
| 2003 | Tum Bin Jaaoon Kahaan | Sandeep Verma | Zee TV |
| 2005–2006 | Piya Ka Ghar | Avinash Sharma | Zee TV |
| 2006 | Apradhi Kaun | | DD National |
| 2006 | C.I.D. – C.I.D. Undercover | Inspector Ajay (Episode 417) | Sony Entertainment Television |
| 2006 | Akela | | Sony Entertainment Television |
| 2006 | C.I.D. – The Secret Of Table No. 6 | Raj (Episode 432) | Sony Entertainment Television |
| 2007 | Aahat – Scarecrow | | Sony Entertainment Television |
| 2007 | C.I.D. – Murder On The Sets | Baljeet (Episode 488) | Sony Entertainment Television |
| 2007 | Sreeguruvayoorappan | Vilwamangalam Swamiyar | Surya TV |
| 2008 | C.I.D. – Chehre Pe Chehra | Karan (Episode 504) | Sony Entertainment Television |
| 2008 | C.I.D. – Khooni Paheli | Dheeraj (Episode 532) | Sony Entertainment Television |
