= Vivahithare Ithile =

1986 film by Balachandra Menon

Vivaahithare Ithile
- Poster
- Directed by: Balachandra Menon
- Written by: Balachandra Menon
- Screenplay by: Balachandra Menon
- Produced by: Varada Balachandra Menon
- Starring: Srividya; Jagathy Sreekumar; Innocent; K. P. A. C. Lalitha
- Cinematography: Jayanan Vincent
- Edited by: K. P. Hariharaputhran
- Music by: Jerry Amaldev
- Production companies: V&V Productions
- Distributed by: V&V Productions
- Release date: 12 September 1986
- Country: India
- Language: Malayalam

Vivaahithare Ithile (This way, couples) is a 1986 Indian Malayalam-language film, directed by Balachandra Menon and produced by Varada Balachandra Menon. The film stars Parvathy, (in her debut film) Jagathy Sreekumar, Innocent and K. P. A. C. Lalitha. The film has musical score by Jerry Amaldev.

== Plot ==
Appu is a simple salesman in a shop in Ooty. He has no family and is unmarried. Kurianchan also works with Appu and lives with his wife, Mary, and kids. Kuriachan and Mary use Appu for babysitting, kitchen work, and other help around the house. Kuriachan's family is all the family Appu has experienced. He hopes to have a family of his own someday. Kuriachan's wife persuades Appu to get married. Appu marries Manju, the only daughter of a rich local businesswoman. Due to Manuju's horoscope, it was difficult for her to get a groom. But Appu and Manju's horoscopes match, which leads to the wedding.

While Appu is a poor salesman, Manju is from an wealthy family. But Manju adores him. Manju's mother is controlling and Manju listen to her every word obediently. Manju works with her mother at the factory. When mother and daughter leave for the factory, Appu gets bored at home. He often haunts his old hangouts, causing his mother-in-law embarrassment. Manju tries to reason with him to discard his old habits and behave like a rich son-in-law, which leads to uncomfortable moments in the couple's lives.

Manju keeps pressuring Appu to behave and interact with people as a man of high status. Appu is a simple person and finds it difficult to act like the rich. Things come to a head and Appu leaves the house. A repentant Manju realizes her mistakes and gets back to Appu.

== Cast ==
- Balachandra Menon as Appu
- Parvathy Jayaram (voiced by Bhagyalakshmi) as Manju
- Srividya as Music teacher
- Jagathy Sreekumar as NRI
- Innocent as Achayan alias Kariachan
- K. P. A. C. Lalitha as Mary, Achayan's wife
- Kottayam Santha as House Asst.
- Sankaradi as Psychiatrist Dr. Satheesh
- Kuthiravattam Pappu as Koshy, father of Mary
- Lalithasree as Achayan love interest
- Latha Thomas as Priya
- Manimala as Manju's mother
- Master Prashobh
- Ragini
- Sreenath
- T. P. Madhavan
- Vidhu Krishnan
- Yadu Krishnan
- Neelu (voiced by Poojappura Ravi) as Astrologer

== Soundtrack ==
The music was composed by Jerry Amaldev and lyrics by Bichu Thirumala. The film background score was done by S. P. Venkatesh.

No.	Song	Singers	Lyrics	Length (m:ss)
1	"Aattakkaaran Chettachaarude"	K. J. Yesudas, Chorus	Bichu Thirumala	
2	"Kadakkan Thudakkam"	K. J. Yesudas, K. S. Chithra, Chorus	Bichu Thirumala	
3	"Sreekumaaranane"	K. S. Chithra, Chorus, Sunanda	Bichu Thirumala	
