= Sayam Sandhya =

- Poster designed by Gayathri Ashokan
- Directed by: Joshiy
- Written by: Dennis Joseph
- Screenplay by: Dennis Joseph
- Produced by: Thiruppathi Chettiyar
- Starring: Mammootty; Geetha; Monisha; Suresh Gopi
- Cinematography: Vipin Das
- Edited by: K. Sankunni
- Music by: Shyam
- Production company: Evershine
- Distributed by: Evershine
- Release date: 11 November 1986
- Running time: 126 min
- Country: India
- Language: Malayalam

Sayam Sandhya is a 1986 Indian Malayalam-language film, directed by Joshiy and produced by Thiruppathi Chettiyar. The film stars Mammootty, Geetha, Monisha and Suresh Gopi. The film has musical score by Shyam. The film was a commercial success .

== Cast ==
- Mammootty as Sivaprasad
- Suresh Gopi as Ravi
- Geetha as Uma
- Monisha as Vinu
- K. P. Ummer as Sivaprasad's Father
- Geetu Mohandas as Young Vinu
- M. G. Soman as Sivaprasad's Brother
- Srividya as Geetha
- Ashokan as Narendran
- Baiju as Tea Supplier
- Viji
- K. P. A. C. Azeez
- Paravoor Bharathan as Iyer
- T. K. Balachandran as Judge

== Soundtrack ==
All lyrics are written by Shibu Chakravarthy; all music is composed by Shyam.

No.	Title	Artist(s)	Length
1.	"Chandragirithaazhvarayil"	K. S. Chithra
2.	"Chandrakkalaamouli"	K. J. Yesudas
3.	"Kaalindeetheeramurangi"	K. J. Yesudas, K. S. Chithra
4.	"Poonthennale Nee"	K. J. Yesudas
5.	"Tharaakaroopini Saraswathi"	K. S. Chithra

== Box office ==
The film was a commercial success.
