= Poonilamazha =

- Directed by: Sunil
- Written by: Sunil
- Produced by: Bindu; Nisha
- Starring: Sanjay Mitra; Shraddha Nigam; Thilakan; Nedumudi Venu
- Cinematography: Anandakuttan
- Edited by: A. Sreekar Prasad
- Music by: Laxmikant–Pyarelal
- Production company: Ponthara films.
- Release date: 25 December 1997
- Running time: 174 minutes
- Country: India
- Language: Malayalam

Poonilamazha is a 1997 Indian Malayalam film written and directed by Sunil. The film was produced by Bindu and Nisha under the banner of Ponthara Films and distributed by Fax Release. It stars Sanjay Mitra and Shraddha Nigam in the lead roles. This was the first ever Malayalam film shot in the Seychelles.

== Cast ==
- Sanjay Mitra as Manu Varma /Manikuttan
- Shraddha Nigam as Anu
- Sarath Babu as Chandran
- Rekha as Leena
- Thilakan as Prathapa Varma
- Janardhanan as Abhimana Varma
- Prem Kumar as Shakthi Varma
- Nedumudi Venu as Dr. Balagopal
- Bindu Panicker as Bharathi
- Jose Pellissery as Swamy
- Santhakumari
- Kalabhavan Haneef
- Yadu Krishnan
- Usha Rani
- Nandu as Goutham
- Santha Kumari as Ammuedathi
- Noushad as Sherkhan

== Soundtrack ==
The film's music was composed by Bollywood composer duo Laxmikant–Pyarelal. Lyrics by Gireesh Puthenchery, Sameer.

#	Title	Lyrics	Performer(s)
1	Aattuthottilil Ninne	Gireesh Puthenchery	M. G. Sreekumar, K. S. Chithra
2	Chilu Chilu Chilachum Cheru Chirakadichum	Gireesh Puthenchery	M. G. Sreekumar
3	Illa Illa Marakilla	Gireesh Puthenchery	Biju Narayanan, Sangeetha Madhav
4	Mizhineerkkadalo	Gireesh Puthenchery	K. J. Yesudas
5	Mizhineerkkadalo [F]	Gireesh Puthenchery	K. S. Chithra
6	One Sip Ahaha..Two Sip	Sameer	Alka Yagnik, Chorus
7	Thaarakam Deepakam Maarivil (Mohana Kalyani)	Gireesh Puthenchery	K. J. Yesudas
8	Thaka Thaanka Thakidathom	Gireesh Puthenchery	K. S. Chithra
