= Artham =

- Poster
- Directed by: Sathyan Anthikkad
- Screenplay by: Venu Nagavally
- Based on: Ethir Katru by Subha
- Produced by: Suriya Chandralal
- Starring: Mammootty; Sreenivasan; Murali; Saranya; Jayaram; Parvathy
- Cinematography: Vipin Mohan
- Edited by: K. Rajagopal
- Music by: Johnson
- Production company: Chanthu Films
- Distributed by: Mudra Arts
- Release date: 28 July 1989
- Running time: 135 minutes
- Country: India
- Language: Malayalam

Artham (transl. The Meaning) is a 1989 Indian Malayalam-language action thriller film directed by Sathyan Anthikkad and written by Venu Nagavally. It stars Mammootty, Sreenivasan, Murali, Saranya, in lead roles along with Parvathy, Mamukkoya, Philomina, Mohan Raj, Thikkurissy Sukumaran Nair, Sukumari, Jagannatha Varma, and Oduvil Unnikrishnan in other pivotal roles. Jayaram plays a cameo role. The music was composed by Johnson.

The film is an adaptation of the Tamil detective novel Ethir Katru by Subha. The story revolves around a loner and award-winning novelist Ben Narendran (Mammootty) who seeks revenge against the forces who murdered his dear friend Janardanan (Jayaram). Joining in Narendran's aid are journalist Manasa (Saranya) and Advocate P. S. Nenmara (Sreenivasan). It was also later adapted in Tamil cinema as Ethir Kaatru (1990).

== Plot ==
The movie starts with a loner named Ben Narendran writing a suicide note. He mentions that he is committing suicide as he has nothing to do with his life. He chooses to jump in front of the train to perform the act. He waits for the train but ends up saving another young man named Janardanan who has the same intention. Janardanan has committed a murder out of desperation and is scared of revenge. Narendran consoles him and offers to take the blame of the murder so that Janardanan can live freely.

Narendran gets sentenced to lifetime imprisonment. While in jail, he writes a book [Sharanalayam] under the pen name "Ben" which becomes immensely popular. He is also given an award by the state, but his true identity is never revealed. Journalist Manasa discovers that the author is behind bars and tries to get a parole for him. Though Narendran is not initially interested, he eventually applies for parole and is granted 28 days of parole so that he can receive the award in person.

Once out of jail, Narendran gets word that Janardanan has died mysteriously. He, with the help of Manasa and his advocate P S Nenmara, sets out on a mission to find the culprits. Janardanan's family, who initially reluctant to help them due to fear, later reveales that, a Mr. Nambiar and his henchmen are behind this. They have now employed Janardanan's sister Geeta, who is blackmailed to work for them. She is killed by Mr. R K Nambyar when they find out she revealed their secrets to Narendran. On the final day of his parole, Narendran has to attend his award ceremony but he first finishes, Mr. RK Nambyar and his men. He then attend the ceremony and reveal that he killed for the first time but he feels justice is served now. He finally feels that there is now a meaning (Artham -Film title) in his otherwise aimless life. He then voluntarily surrenders in front of police.

== Cast ==
- Mammootty as Ben Narendran
- Sreenivasan as Adv. P. S. Nenmara
- Saranya Ponvannan as Manasa
- Murali as R. K. Nambyar
- Jayaram as Janardanan(cameo)
- Parvathi as Geetha
- Kollam Thulasi as Jaleel
- Mamukkoya as Kunjikannan
- Philomina as house owner
- Thikkurissy Sukumaran Nair as Sukumaran, Janardanan's father
- Sukumari as Janardanan's mother
- Mohan Raj (Keerikkadan Jose) as Stanley
- Jagannatha Varma as Warrier
- Oduvil Unnikrishnan as Ananthan
- Karamana Janardanan Nair as George Zachariah
- Azeez as David
- Jagannathan as bookshop owner
- Sindhu Varma

== Soundtrack ==
Lyrics by Kaithapram.

- "Shyaamambaram Neele" (male) - K J Yesudas
- "Shyaamambaram Neele" (female) - K S Chitra

== Box office ==
The film was one of the hits of 1989. It had also marked the Malayalam debut of actress, Saranya (in her mother-tongue).
