= Adhipan =

- Poster
- Directed by: K. Madhu
- Written by: Jagadeesh
- Produced by: Geethika
- Starring: Mohanlal; Parvathy; Monisha
- Cinematography: Vipindas
- Edited by: V. P. Krishnan
- Music by: Shyam
- Production company: Geethika Arts
- Distributed by: K. R. G. Enterprises
- Release date: 28 October 1989
- Running time: 135 minutes
- Country: India
- Language: Malayalam

Adhipan (transl. Lord) is a 1989 Indian Malayalam-language action thriller film directed by K. Madhu and written by Jagadeesh. The film stars Mohanlal, Parvathy and Monisha. The film features background score and songs composed by Shyam. The film was an average grosser at box office. Adhipan was released on 28 October 1989, Deepavali day.

== Plot ==
Shyamprakash is a leading criminal lawyer in the city. He decides to take revenge against business tycoon, Mohan who had gotten away after murdering his sister and mother.

== Cast ==
- Mohanlal as Advocate Shyam Prakash
- Parvathy Jayaram as Radhika Menon, Shyam Prakash's lover
- Monisha Unni as Geetha, Shyam Prakash's sister-like-figure
- Devan as Mohan
- Janardhanan as Kaimal
- Sukumaran as SP Sunil Nambiar
- Jagadish as Pothen, junior advocate of Shyam Prakash
- Maniyanpilla Raju as Gopalakrishnan, junior advocate of Shyam Prakash
- M. G. Soman as SP Rajasekharan
- Kaviyoor Ponnamma as Shyam Prakash's mother
- Balan K. Nair as Sreedharan Mash, Shyam Prakash's family friend
- Suresh Gopi as himself (cameo)
- Kuthiravattom Pappu as Raghavan / Raghavettan, Shyam Prakash's driver and assistant
- Kollam Thulasi as Vasudevan, Mohan's uncle and Kaimal's brother-in-law
- Prathapachandran as G. K., Kaimal's rival and business partner
- Karamana Janardanan Nair as Minister, Kaimal's friend
- Jagannatha Varma as Dr. K. S. Menon, Radhika's father
- Mafia Sasi as Goonda
- Rajan Sankaradi as Goonda
- Vijayan Peringode as Goonda

== Soundtrack ==
All lyrics are written by Chunakkara Ramankutty; all music is composed by Shyam.

No.	Title	Artist(s)	Length
1.	"Choolamadikkum Kaate"	M. G. Sreekumar
2.	"Shyaamameghame Nee"	K. S. Chithra
