= Utharam =

- Promotional poster
- Directed by: V. K. Pavithran
- Written by: M. T. Vasudevan Nair
- Based on: No Motive by Daphne du Maurier
- Produced by: Akbar
- Starring: Mammootty; Suparna; Sukumaran; Parvathy
- Cinematography: Ramachandra Babu
- Edited by: Ravi
- Music by: Johnson (background score); Vidhyadharan (songs)
- Distributed by: Srudhi Combines
- Release date: 4 May 1989
- Country: India
- Language: Malayalam

Utharam (English: Answer) is a 1989 Malayalam mystery-thriller film, starring Mammootty, Suparna, Sukumaran, and Parvathy. It was written by Malayalam writer M. T. Vasudevan Nair based on the short story No Motive by Daphne du Maurier. Utharam is considered one of the best investigative thrillers in Malayalam cinema.

== Plot ==
Selina Joseph, a budding poet leading a happy family life, commits suicide on a very "usual" day by shooting herself with her husband's gun. The police write this off as a freak accident, but her husband, planter Mathew, realizes that it was a suicide. He is perplexed as to the motive of her action. He becomes increasingly depressed and drowns his worries in alcohol.

Balachandran Nair, a Delhi-based journalist and close friend of Mathew, who was close to both Selina and Mathew, decides to look into the reasons that led her to commit suicide. He advises Mathew to stop drinking and ruining his health as Selina wouldn't have wanted that. Mathew and the household servants confirm that Selina was happy with her life and that there was no motive for her suicide.

Balu starts his investigation of Selina's past by tracking down different people from her past. Balu focuses on Selina's school days after a relative reveals that Selina had to drop off from school after she was badly injured in a bus accident during a school trip. Balu sets off to Bengaluru and promises to keep in touch with Mathew via letter or telephone. Balu finds out from the school principal that there was no accident, and Selina was dismissed when it was found that she was pregnant. Balu meets Selina's school mate Prof. Shyamala Menon, who had lost touch with Selina after she discontinued her grade 10 studies abruptly. Selina and Shyamala were best friends in their school days. Though hesitant at first, Shyamala narrates an incident from their school days, and Balu realizes the truth behind the pregnancy.

Balu finds out that after Selina was dismissed from school, her father arranged for her to deliver the child without anyone knowing about the pregnancy. As she was unaware of the circumstances that led to her getting pregnant, she considered herself to be a virgin and called her son Immanuel, meaning the son of the Holy Virgin Mary. Her child was moved to an orphanage by her father Antony without her knowledge. Selena loses her memory after a car accident and forgets her child.

After this, Balu decides to find out if anything unusual had taken place on the day of her suicide. The house help tells him that a rag picker boy was caught stealing from the yard that day, and Selina had asked the child for his name. Upon hearing that his name was Immanuel Antony, Selena realizes that it was her son. Seeing her son after a decade as a rag picker, she is shocked and commits suicide. Balu decides not to reveal the unpleasant truth to Mathew.

The film ends with Shyamala and Balu falling in love with each other, finding Immanuel – Selina's son, and adopting him for Selina.

== Cast ==
- Mammootty as Balachandran Nair a.k.a. Balu
- Suparna as Selina Joseph née Selina Mathew a.k.a. Leena
- Sukumaran as Mathew a.k.a. Mathukkutty
- Parvathy as Shyamala Menon a.k.a.Shyama
- Karamana Janardanan Nair as Antony a.k.a. Kunnathurachan
- Innocent as Nanu
- Sankaradi as Achuvettan
- Sukumari as Molly Aunty
- Chandran Nair as Kapyar Mathai
- V. K. Sreeraman as Superintendent
- Valsala Menon as Warden Annie
- Santhakumari as Nurse
- Jayalalitha as Dr. Malathi Krishna
- Jagannathan as Manager Subrahmaniyam
- Thrissur Elsy as Annamma chettathi
- Akbar as Principal
- Murukan as Immanuel
- James as Narayanan
- Shanthi as Nurse

== Soundtrack ==
All songs are composed by Vidhyadharan with lyrics by O. N. V. Kurup. The background score of the film was done by Johnson.

Track #	Song	Singer(s)
1	"Manjin Vilolamam" (M)	G. Venugopal
2	"Manjin Vilolamam" (F)	B. Arundhathi
3	"Ninnilasooyayarnnu"	B. Arundhathi
4	"Swaramidarathe"	G. Venugopal, B. Arundhathi
5	"Aalthirakkilum"	B. Arundhathi
6	"Snehikkunnu Njan"	B. Arundhathi
7	"Tibetan Folk Song"	Various Artists
