= Parvathy Jayaram =

Indian actress and classical dancer (born 1970)

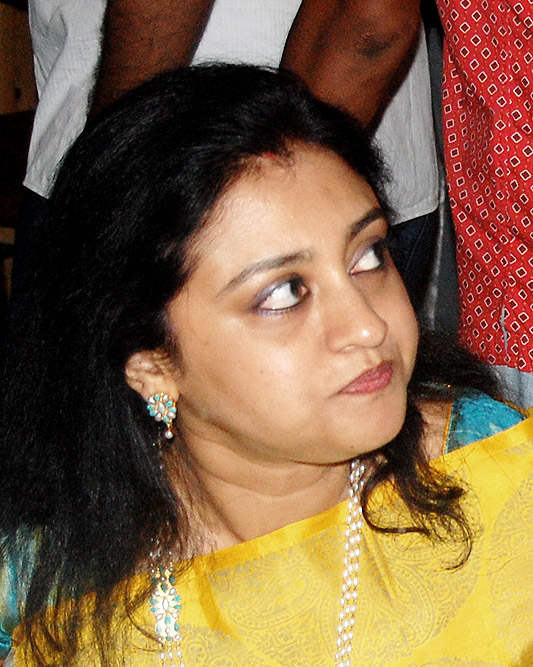
- Parvathy in 2010
- Born: Ashwathy Kurup; 7 April 1970 (age 56); Thiruvalla, Pathanamthitta, Kerala, India
- Years active: 1986–1993
- Spouse: Jayaram (m. 1992)
- Children: 2, including Kalidas Jayaram

Ashwathy Kurup (born 7 April 1970), better known by her stage name Parvathy, is an Indian former actress, costume designer and classical dancer, who has appeared in Malayalam films.

Parvathy was a popular actress in Malayalam cinema during the late 1980s and early 1990s. Her first film was directed by Lenin Rajendran, but was shelved and never released. She was introduced to the industry by actor-director Balachandra Menon through Vivahithare Ithile in 1986. Her notable works include Oru Minnaminunginte Nurunguvettam (1987), Thoovanathumbikal (1987), Ponmuttayidunna Tharavu (1988), Aparan (1988), Vadakkunokkiyantram (1989), 1921 (1988), Kireedam (1989), Peruvannapurathe Visheshangal (1989), Artham (1989), Utharam (1989), Jagratha (1989), Dr. Pasupathy (1990), Akkare Akkare Akkare (1990) Souhrudam (1991) and Kamaladalam (1992).

Parvathy married film actor Jayaram who was her co-star in many films on 7 September 1992 at Town Hall, Ernakulam. After marriage, Parvathy effectively quit acting in films by her own will. She now lives with her family in Chennai. The couple have two children, Kalidas Jayaram and Malavika Jayaram.

== Personal life ==
Ashwathy Kurup was born as second among three children to Ramachandra Kurup and Padma Bai in Thiruvalla, in an affluent Nair sub-caste of landlords. Her father is from Champakulam, Alappuzha and her mother from Kaviyoor, Thiruvalla. She has an elder sister Jyothi and a younger sister Deepthi (deceased). Shobhana Chandrakumar Pillai is her cousin. She had her primary education at Devaswom Board Higher Secondary School, Thiruvalla. Her mother was a maths teacher at the same school she studied at. She pursued a Pre-degree from NSS Hindu College, Changanassery. This was where she was discovered by director Lenin Rajendran, who cast her as the lead in a film that was shelved and was never released. She then acted in her first movie Vivahitare Itihile (1986), directed by Balachandra Menon at the age of 16.

Parvathy met her future husband Jayaram on the set of Aparan, at Udaya Studio in Alappuzha, in 1988. After her marriage on 7 September 1992, Parvathy stopped acting and later said that she has no regrets. "One spouse has to sacrifice their career, otherwise, it will be difficult to bring up the children properly. If there is a good salary earned by the husband, why should the wife work?"

The couple have two children, Kalidas Jayaram (born 1993) and Malavika (born 1996). Kalidas Jayaram won the National Film Award for Best Child Artist for his work in the film Ente Veedu Appuvinteyum (2003), in which he acted in along with his father, Jayaram. Currently, she resides in Valasaravakkam, Tamil Nadu with her family.

== Filmography ==
List of film credits
Year	Title	Role	Director	Notes
1986	Vivahitare Itihile	Manju	Balachandra Menon	Voiced by Bhagyalakshmi
1987	Amrutham Gamaya	Sreedevi	T. Hariharan	
1987	Ezhuthappurangal	Seetha	Sibi Malayil	
1987	Jaalakam	Latha	Harikumar	
1987	Oru Minnaminunginte Nurunguvettam	Unnimaya	Bharathan	
1987	Thoovanathumbikal	Radha	P. Padmarajan	
1987	Thaniyavarthanam	Sreedharan's lover	Sibi Malayil	Cameo
1987	Oru Maymasa Pulariyil		V. R. Gopinath	
1987	Mizhiyithalil Kanneerumayi	-	Prakash Kolleri	
1988	Abkari	Sharadha	I. V. Sasi	
1988	Aranyakam	Shailaja	T.Hariharan	
1988	Dinarathrangal	Treesa	Joshi	
1988	Vaishali	Shantha	Bharathan	
1988	Witness	Indu R Nair	Viji Thampi	
1988	1921	Aasiya	I. V. Sasi	
1988	Aparan	Sindhu	P. Padmarajan	
1988	Ponmuttayidunna Tharavu	Hajiyar's third wife	Sathyan Anthikkad	Cameo
1988	Ashokante Aswathikuttikku	Aswathi	Vijayan Karott	
1988	Mrithunjayam	Sabeena	Paul Babu	
1988	Kudumbapuranam	Rama	Sathyan Anthikkad	
1988	Sangham	Aswathy	Joshi	
1988	Ulsavapittennu	Karthika	Bharath Gopi	
1988	Oozham	Seetha	Harikumar	
1988	Poovukkul Boogambam	Shanthi	Thiagarajan	Tamil movie
1989	Douthyam	Biji	Anil	
1989	Adharvam	Usha	Dennis Joseph	
1989	Artham	Geetha	Sathyan Anthikkad	
1989	Jagratha	Aswathy	K. Madhu	
1989	Carnival	Gouri	P. G. Vishwambharan	
1989	Njangalude Kochu Doctor	Ayisha	Balachandra Menon	
1989	Kireedam	Devi	Sibi Malayil	
1989	Mudra	Sarala	Sibi Malayil	
1989	Peruvannapurathe Visheshangal	Kunjulekshmi	Kamal	
1989	Puthiya Karukkal	Sridevi	Thampi Kannanthanam	
1989	Swagatham	Veni	Venu Nagavalli	
1989	Utharam	Shyamala Menon	V. K. Pavithran	
1989	Vadakku Nooki Yanthram	Shobha	Sreenivasan	
1989	Vachanam		Lenin Rajendran	
1989	Devadas	Parvathi	Cross Belt Mani	
1989	Anagha	Nalini / Mini	PRS Babu	Double role
1989	Varnam	Revathy	Ashokan	
1989	Pradeshika Varthakal	Mallika	Kamal	
1989	Adhipan	Radhika	K. Madhu	
1990	Akkare Akkare Akkare	Sethulakshmi	Priyadarshan	
1990	Dr. Pasupathy	Ammukkutty	Shaji Kailas	
1990	Kuruppinte Kanakku Pustakom	Beena	Balachandra Menon	
1990	Maalayogam	Rema	Sibi Malayil	
1990	Orukkam	Kausalya	K. Madhu	
1990	Pavakkoothu	Sumithra	K. Sreekuttan	
1990	Purappadu	Mallika	Jeasey	
1990	Radha Madhavam	Ammu	Suresh Unnithan	
1990	Saandhram	Indulekha	Ashokan -Thaha	
1990	Subhayathra	Arundhati	Kamal	
1990	Thalayanamanthram	Shailaja	Sathyan Anthikkad	
1990	Vyooham	Tessy	Sangeeth Sivan	
1990	Noottonnu Raavukal	Malati	Sasi Mohan	
1991	Amina Tailors	Amina	Sajan	
1991	Souhrudam	Sridevi	Shaji Kailas	
1991	Abhayam	Lakshmi	Sivan	
1991	Apoorvam Chilar	Annie	Kala Adoor	
1992	Kunukkitta Kozhi	Indu	Viji Thampi	
1992	Soorya Gayathri	Sreelakshmi	Anil	
1992	Kamaladalam	Sumangala	Sibi Malayil	
1992	Gowri		Sivaprasad	
1992	Kizhakkan Pathrose	Molly	T. S. Suresh Babu	
1992	Valayam	Seetha	Sibi Malayil	
1992	Kavacham	Customs officer	K. Madhu	
1992	Dhanurvedham		Alleppy Ranganath	
1993	Ghoshayaathra	Nazeema	G. S. Vijayan	
1993	Oru Neenda Yathra	Parvathi	Murali Nair	
1993	Chenkol	Devi	Sibi Malayil	Archive footage from Kireedam

== As costume designer ==
For Jayaram and Actresses of the respective movies;

- 2005 – Finger Print
- 2005 – Sarkar Dada
- 2006 – Madhuchandralekha
- 2009 – My Big Father

== Television ==
List of television credits
Year	Show	Role	Channel	Notes
1990s	Kumilakal	Actress	DD Malayalam	TV Serial
1990s	Mohangal	Actress	DD Malayalam	TV Serial
2012	Ningalkkum Aakaam Kodeeshwaran	Contestant	Asianet	Reality show
2023	Ente amma superaa	Guest	Flowers	Reality show
