= Girija Shettar =

British actress (born 1969)

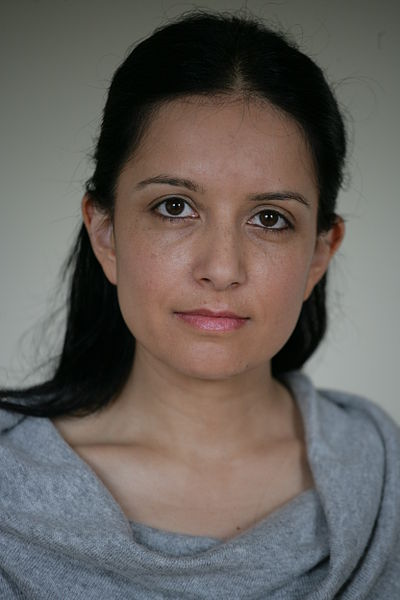
- Shettar in 2013
- Born: 20 July 1969 (age 57); Orsett, Essex, England
- Occupations: Actress; Journalist
- Years active: 1989 – 2003, 2024 – present

Girija Shettar (born 20 July 1969) is a British actress, known for her works in South Indian films.

== Career ==
In 1989, Shettar starred in Mani Ratnam's Telugu film Geethanjali and Malayalam film Vandanam, directed by Priyadarshan.

In 1992, she signed for the lead female role in Jo Jeeta Wohi Sikandar, which she left mid-way to complete a prior commitment. Ayesha Julka replaced her after the first schedule. She can still be seen dancing in the song "Are Yaaro" which was retained in the final version of the film.

In the same year, she starred in another Telugu film Hrudayanjali, under the direction of A. Raghurami Reddy, which won four state Nandi Awards. The film was completed in 1992 but was released only in 2002.

== Personal life ==
Girija Shettar was born on 20 July 1969 in Orsett, Essex to a Kannadiga doctor father and a British mother. From the age of 18, Girija trained in Bharatanatyam. She completed a doctoral thesis in Integral Yoga Philosophy and Indian spiritual psychology from Cardiff University in 2003. She spends as much time as possible at Sri Aurobindo Ashram in Puducherry. Girija is currently a writer based in London. Previously working for a medical technology newsletter, she is now writing for a shipping magazine. A booklet of haiku poetry entitled "This Year, Daffodils" was published by Survivors' Poetry and the Esmee Fairburn Foundation, 2011. In 2014, she won Social Media Journalist of the Year as senior reporter for IHS Maritime Fairplay at Seahorse Journalist Awards, London.

After the release of Geethanjali, she appeared on the front page of Screen (magazine), India 30 June 1989 issue. In 2002, Geethanjali was one of five films shown at the British Film Institute during a retrospective of Mani Ratnam's work. The films were chosen as examples of strong heroine roles in Indian films.

== Filmography ==
Year	Title	Role(s)	Language	Notes	Ref.
1989	Geethanjali	Geethanjali	Telugu	Nominated - Filmfare Award for Best Actress – Telugu	
1989	Vandanam	Gaadha Fernandes	Malayalam		
1989	Dhanushkodi	Girija	Malayalam	Unreleased	
1992	Jo Jeeta Wohi Sikandar		Hindi	Uncredited appearance in song "Arre Yaaron Mere Pyaaron"	
2002	Hrudayanjali	Maya	Telugu	Delayed release	
2003	Tujhe Meri Kasam	Herself	Hindi	Cameo	
2024	Ibbani Tabbida Ileyali	Madhumitha	Kannada		
