= Geethanjali (1989 film) =

1989 Indian Telugu film by Mani Ratnam

- Film poster
- Directed by: Mani Ratnam
- Written by: Mani Ratnam
- Dialogues by: Rajasri
- Produced by: C. Praveen Kumar Reddy
- Starring: Nagarjuna; Girija
- Cinematography: P. C. Sreeram
- Edited by: B. Lenin; V. T. Vijayan
- Music by: Ilaiyaraaja
- Production company: Bhagyalakshmi Enterprises
- Distributed by: Bhagyalakshmi Enterprises
- Release date: 12 May 1989
- Running time: 135 minutes
- Country: India
- Language: Telugu
- Budget: ₹1.2 crore

Geethanjali (/ɡiːθɑːndʒəli/) is a 1989 Indian Telugu-language romantic drama film co-written and directed by Mani Ratnam. The film stars Nagarjuna and Girija, with music composed by Ilaiyaraaja. The story revolves around two terminally ill individuals who fall in love, despite knowing they have limited time to live.

Geethanjali was released on 12 May 1989. It became a commercial success, running for over 100 days in theatres and receiving praise for its direction, cinematography, music, and performances. The film won several awards, including the National Film Award for Best Popular Film and six state Nandi Awards including Best Feature Film.

The film marked a turning point in Nagarjuna's career, making him a heartthrob among Telugu audiences and attracting a significant female following. Ratnam also gained considerable recognition in Andhra Pradesh due to this film. It was later unofficially remade in Hindi as Yaad Rakhegi Duniya (1992).

== Plot ==
Prakash is a carefree, recently graduated college student who undergoes routine medical examinations following a minor vehicular accident at a celebratory party. The diagnostics reveal that he is suffering from terminal chronic myeloid leukemia, with only a few months left to live. Unable to bear his mother's overwhelming grief and seeking personal peace, Prakash relocates to his family's vacation home in the misty hill station of Ooty. There, he encounters Geethanjali, a mischievous and vibrant young woman who frequently stages elaborate ghostly pranks with her friends to frighten the locals. When she invites Prakash to a secluded church after sunset to make him her next target, Prakash, having anticipated her antics, uses aerial wires to disguise himself as a vampire, successfully terrifying her instead.

Frustrated by her failure to intimidate him, a vengeful Geethanjali falsely tells her grandmother that Prakash propositioned her to elope. The grandmother publicly humiliates Prakash, prompting an enraged Prakash to retaliate by driving Geethanjali to an isolated hillside and abandoning her there. Upon being informed by Geethanjali's sister of her prolonged absence, a remorseful Prakash returns to find her shivering in the cold and brings her back home. As her grandmother berates him for his recklessness, she discloses that Geethanjali suffers from a terminal heart condition, Tetralogy of Fallot.

Stunned that someone facing imminent mortality can remain so vivacious, Prakash pursues a friendship with Geethanjali. She explains her philosophy: since death is inevitable for everyone, one should celebrate the present moment rather than languishing in fear of the end. Inspired by her resilience, Prakash embraces his own diagnosis and resolves to live fully. The two bond deeply over their shared circumstances, and their friendship eventually blossoms into a mutual romantic relationship.

Their romance is disrupted when Prakash's mother visits Ooty and inadvertently reveals Prakash's terminal illness to Geethanjali, who was previously unaware of it. Devastated by the realization that she will inevitably lose him, Geethanjali experiences an emotional breakdown and demands that Prakash leave her. Prakash attempts to comfort her by reminding her of her own philosophy regarding death, but an overwhelmed Geethanjali asserts that his impending demise is far more painful to contemplate than her own, repeating her demand that he depart. That night, the psychological stress triggers a severe cardiac episode, and Geethanjali is rushed to the hospital. When Prakash attempts to visit her, her father—a cardiologist—restrains him, pleading with him to respect his daughter's wishes to avoid further destabilizing her health.

Heartbroken, Prakash prepares to leave the town by train while Geethanjali undergoes emergency open-heart surgery. Following the operation, a recovering Geethanjali immediately demands to see Prakash. Recognizing the depth of their bond, her family rushes her to the railway station just as Prakash's train is about to depart. Spotting her on the platform, Prakash disembarks and runs to her. The couple passionately reunites and shares a kiss, choosing to embrace their remaining time together despite the tragic certainty of their medical conditions.

== Cast ==
- Nagarjuna as A. Prakash
- Girija as Geethanjali (Voice Dubbed by Rohini)
- Vijayakumar as Geethanjali's father
- Vijayachander as Prakash's father
- Velu as Velu, Ooty house caretaker
- Pradeep Shakthi as Inspector
- Sumithra as Prakash's mother
- Radhabai as Geethanjali's grandmother
- Janaki as Lakshmi, Ooty house care taker
- Silk Smitha (special appearance in the song "Jagada Jagada")
- Disco Shanti as Usha
- Padma as Geethanjali's younger sister
- Priya as Geethanjali's younger sister
- Neena as Geethanjali's younger sister

Special appearances

- Sowcar Janaki as University Chancellor
- Chandramohan as Usha's husband
- Mucherla Aruna as Prakash's doctor
- Sundaram Master (uncredited appearance in the song "Jallanta Kavvinta")

== Production ==
=== Development ===
Nagarjuna, fascinated by Mani Ratnam's Mouna Ragam (1986), was eager to collaborate with the director. Recognising his own cinematic sensibilities through Ratnam's work, he persistently waited outside Ratnam's house each morning, hoping to engage in conversations during the director's daily walks. After a month of persistence, Nagarjuna persuaded Ratnam to direct a Telugu film with him in the lead. Despite initial reluctance, Ratnam agreed, leading to the creation of Geethanjali—his only Telugu film.

The title Geethanjali was inspired by a Delhi-based 11-year-old girl suffering from cancer, whose emotional diary entries were published at the time, deeply moving Ratnam, who decided to name both the film and its heroine after her. The film was produced on a budget of around ₹1.2 crore. Nagarjuna was paid ₹7.5 lakh while Ratnam's remuneration was ₹10 lakh.

=== Cast and crew ===
Girija was cast as the lead actress in Geethanjali after Mani Ratnam noticed her at his wedding to Suhasini, where she accompanied the sister of cricketer Krishnamachari Srikkanth. She trained under a senior associate director for two months before filming. During post-production, her voice was dubbed by Rohini.

Mani Ratnam, impressed with Rajasri's work on Telugu dubs of his Tamil films, asked him to write for his first straight Telugu film. Rajasri agreed, and Mani Ratnam ensured that every dialogue was translated into Tamil and made adjustments as necessary. The film featured fewer dialogues compared to a typical love story.

=== Filming ===
Principal photography began on 12 October 1988 and was completed in sixty working days. Suhasini, newly-wedded to Mani Ratnam, clapped the first shot. The filming started early at dawn, around 5 AM, and wrapped up by about 11 AM, with the cast and crew arriving on location an hour before filming. Most of the scenes were shot in the misty valleys of Ooty, chosen by Ratnam for its soft, poetic atmosphere to capture a dreamy, romantic feel. The hero's house scenes were filmed at a hotel in Ooty where Nagarjuna stayed, and the heroine's house was a guesthouse in Ooty. Additional scenes set in Madras were filmed at the Vasan House, owned by S. S. Vasan of Gemini Studios. An ice machine was brought from Madras to enhance the mist when needed.

The film's songs were shot across various scenic locations. "Jallanta Kavvinta" and "Aamani Paadave" were filmed in Ooty. "O Priyaa, Priyaa" was shot in Jaisalmer with around 100 camels and completed in one week. The film featured innovative techniques, such as using ice for mist effects and employing a round trolley for a single-take song. P. C. Sreeram's cinematography was noted for its natural, poetic style capturing the serenity of Ooty with wide-angle lenses and presenting the lead actors with soft lenses to create a dreamlike appearance.

In the film's climax, a dialogue was added that reads, "Enni rojulu bratukutaaro teliyadu kaanii bratikinannaallu santoshamgaa untaaru" (transl. No one knows how many days they will live, but they will live those remaining days happily). This change was influenced by the President of Nagarjuna's Fan Association, who expressed dissatisfaction with the intended ending. He suggested that the conclusion should reflect a more positive outcome, since both hero and heroine dying would not make the audiences happy. Consequently, that line was added to align with this feedback.

== Soundtrack ==
The film's soundtrack, composed by Ilaiyaraaja, was a major hit even before the film's release. Lyrics for the songs were written by Veturi. Mani Ratnam had the lyrics translated into English to understand their meaning, and he was so impressed that Veturi became the permanent lyricist for all his future films. Both the soundtrack and background music played a key role in the film's success and remained popular with audiences. The song "O Priya Priya" was later unofficially adapted into the Hindi film Dil (1990) by Anand-Milind.

Telugu
No.	Title	Singer(s)	Length
1.	"O Priya Priya!"	K. S. Chithra, S. P. Balasubrahmanyam	5:44
2.	"Jagada Jagada"	S. P. Balasubrahmanyam	4:24
3.	"Aamani Paadave"	S. P. Balasubrahmanyam	4:24
4.	"Nandikonda Vaagullona"	K. S. Chithra, S. P. Balasubrahmanyam	5:02
5.	"Om Namaha"	S. Janaki, S. P. Balasubrahmanyam	4:06
6.	"O Papa Lali!"	S. P. Balasubrahmanyam	4:27
7.	"Jallanta Kavvinta"	K. S. Chithra	4:08
Total length:			32:40

All lyrics are written by Vaalee; all music is composed by Ilaiyaraaja.

Tamil
No.	Title	Singer(s)	Length
1.	"Oh Priya Priya!"	Mano, K. S. Chithra
2.	"Vidiya Vidiya Nadanam"	Mano
3.	"Kaviyam Padava Thendrale"	Mano
4.	"Kattukulle Paatu Sollum"	Mano, K. S. Chithra
5.	"Om Namaha"	Mano, S. Janaki
6.	"Oh Papa Laali"	Mano
7.	"Aththadi Ammadi"	K. S. Chithra

== Release ==
Due to distributor scepticism, producer Praveen Kumar Reddy distributed the film himself in select places like Visakhapatnam. Geethanjali was released on 12 May 1989 and was a commercial success, running for over 100 days in theatres. The film was dubbed in Tamil as Idhayate Thirudaade (transl. Don't steal my heart) and was released on 5 July 1989, and was also successful. It was also dubbed into Malayalam and was unofficially remade in Hindi as Yaad Rakhegi Duniya (1992).

== Accolades ==
Event	Award	Awardee	Ref.
37th National Film Awards	Best Popular Film Providing Wholesome Entertainment	Geethanjali	
37th Filmfare Awards South	Best Director – Telugu	Mani Ratnam	
Nandi Awards	Best Feature Film – Gold	P. R. Prasad, C. Praveen Kumar Reddy	
Nandi Awards	Best Story Writer	Mani Ratnam	
Nandi Awards	Best Male Comedian	Suthi Velu	
Nandi Awards	Best Choreography	Sundaram Master	
Nandi Awards	Best Cinematographer	P. C. Sreeram	
Nandi Awards	Best Art Direction	Thota Tharani	

== Legacy ==
Geethanjali made Nagarjuna a heartthrob among Telugu audiences, attracting a significant female following and marking a turning point in his career. Released five months before another major hit, Shiva, both films solidified Nagarjuna's appeal to both class and mass audiences, paving the way for future blockbusters. Girija's costumes from the film became popular among the younger generation, while Nagarjuna's hairstyle set a trend. Mani Ratnam also gained considerable recognition in Andhra Pradesh due to this film. The song "O Papa Laali" inspired the title of the Telugu dubbed version of Keladi Kannmanii, which had lyrics by Rajasri. The Tamil version of the song "O Papa Laali" is played by Pazham (Dhanush) in Thiruchitrambalam (2022).

== Sources ==
- Rangan, Baradwaj (2012). Conversations with Mani Ratnam. Penguin Books. ISBN 978-0-670-08520-0.
