= Suparna Anand =

Indian actress

- Born: Suparna; Mumbai, Maharashtra, India
- Occupation: Actor
- Years active: 1979–1997
- Spouse: Sanjay Mitra (m. 1997; div. 2008) Rajesh Savlani (m. 2010)
- Children: 2

Suparna Anand is an Indian actress from New Delhi. She has appeared in Malayalam and Hindi films. She is known for her portrayal of the titular Vaisali in the movie Vaisali, directed by Bharathan and written by M. T. Vasudevan Nair, as well as for her performance as Bhama in Njan Gandharvan, written and directed by P. Padmarajan.

== Personal life ==
She was married to Sanjay Mitra, her co-star in Vaishali in 1997 and they have two sons, Manav Mitra (b. 1999) and Bhavya Mitra (b. 2001). They divorced in 2008 and she remarried in 2010 to Rajesh Savlani, a Delhi-based businessman.

== Career ==
Suparna Anand acted between 1979 and 1997. She acted in many Hindi, Kannada, Tamil, Telugu and Malayalam films in lead roles. She acted in the role of Jyoti Deshmukh in the Anil Kapoor-Madhuri Dixit starrer Tezaab (1988). She played, Jyoti Deshmukh, Anil Kapoor's younger sister role.

== Filmography ==
Year	Movie	Language	Role
1979	Nagin Aur Suhagin	Hindi	Young Gouri; Child artist
1982	Chorni	Hindi	Child artist
1988	Vaishali	Malayalam	Vaishali
1988	Witness	Malayalam	
1988	Akarshan	Hindi	Starlife Photographer
1988	Zulm Ko Jala Doonga	Hindi	Gowri
1988	Tezaab	Hindi	Jyoti Deshmukh
1988	Daada	Kannada	Asha
1989	Utharam	Malayalam	Saleena Joseph
1989	Dravidan	Tamil	Radha
1989	Ashoka Chakravarthy	Telugu	Preeti
1990	Nagarangalil Chennu Raparkam	Malayalam	Asha
1990	Muqaddar Ka Badshaah	Hindi	Geeta
1991	Njan Gandharvan	Malayalam	Bhama
1991	Ananda Niketan	Bengali	Rumi
1992	Dil Ne Ikraar Kiya	Hindi	
1997	Aastha: In the Prison of Spring	Hindi	Student
2014	Vellimoonga	Malayalam	Actress; Archive footage from Vaishali
