= Adharvam =

- Promotional poster
- Directed by: Dennis Joseph
- Written by: Shibu Chakravarthy
- Produced by: Elias Eeraly
- Starring: Mammootty; Charuhasan; K. B. Ganesh Kumar; Silk Smitha; Thilakan; Jose Prakash; Parvathy Jayaram; Jayabharathi
- Cinematography: Anandakuttan; Ajayan Vincent
- Edited by: K. Shankunny
- Music by: Ilaiyaraaja
- Release date: 1 June 1989
- Country: India
- Language: Malayalam

Adharvam (transl. Atharvaveda) is a 1989 Indian Malayalam-language supernatural horror film directed by Dennis Joseph and written by Shibu Chakravarthy, starring Mammootty, K. B. Ganesh Kumar, Charuhasan, Silk Smitha, Thilakan, and Parvathy Jayaram. Mammootty played the role of Anantha Padmanabhan, an expert in mystic tantric rituals. The songs and background score of the movie were by Ilaiyaraaja. This movie is considered as one of the best movies in Mammootty's career. It is an underrated gem and later got cult status.

== Plot ==
Thevalli Namboodiri is a renowned astrologer. One day while helping the people of his village to find the root cause of some mishaps, Thevalli finds out that the problems are due to the black magic and other tantric kriyas performed by Mekkadan Namboodiri.

On the request of the villagers, Thevalli goes to meet Mekkadan, who is also a childhood friend, but Mekkadan does not value the words of Thevalli and moreover tells him that his illicit son born out of a low caste woman Malu will become his disciple and practice these dark arts. Thevalli becomes concerned. During the Upanayanam of his actual son, he sees his illicit son also. Thevalli decides to teach both of them the 3 Vedas in order to make both sons illustrious, taking the advice of his mentor Thirumeni.

Anantha Padmanabhan, who is the illicit son of Thevalli, becomes a master of vedas and Tantric painting. He loves the daughter of Putthedan Namboodiri who is an aristocratic bramhin and loathes Anantha Padmanabhan. Vishnu, the second son, studies in the city where he loves a woman named Usha. One day while Thevalli is doing a prashanam (astrological prediction) and asks Ananthan for an opinion in front of all the assembled nambodiris, Puthedan insults Ananthan based on his birth. Ananthan leaves abruptly. He is followed by Mekkadan, who sympathises with him and welcomes him to study atharvaveda. Later Ananthan and his lover are caught by Putthedan, who drags his daughter away and beats up Ananthan and burns his house. Ananthan's old mother is not able to escape and dies in the fire. This prompts Ananthan to seek vengeance and wreak havoc in his village. He seeks out Mekkadan, and offers to become his disciple; they move on to a remote location and practice dark magic.

Later on Mekkadan dies, but Ananthan continues his studies, which leads to severe calamities and deaths in his village. Ananthan uses his power and magic to keep the tribals around his house happy and servile. The daughter of the tribal chief, Ponni, offers herself to Ananthan, who maintains his celibacy and uses Ponni for advanced Abhichara Karma. To put a stop to all this, Thevalli asks his younger son to meet his elder brother and dissuade him from destroying the village. Vishnu, along with his friends, travels to the forests where the house of Ananthan is located, the tribals refusing to help them. Ananthan himself comes and warns Vishnu not to interfere. Friends of Ananthan hurt the village chief badly to make sure Ananthan leaves his house to treat the chief. While Ananthan is away from his home, Vishnu and his friends enter the house and invoke counter tantric measures. In spite of Vishnu's warning, when his friend removes the magical protection which saves the house from the destructive powers of nature, he is killed by an entity. As a result, a storm wreaks havoc in the entire area.

Vishnu places Usha inside a magical circle for her protection. Usha awakens the destructive powers of nature when she places a circle inside a Tantric kalam. This releases all the entities who were enslaved by Ananthan, who seek revenge. While returning Ananthan realizes that someone has entered his mansion. Crossing the river with Ponni, the boat overturns and she dies. Another friend of Vishnu is killed by tribals. Ananthan reaches the mansion and finds all the entities enslaved by him are trying to get their revenge. After instructing Vishnu to seek the blessing of the Devi Idol in the basement of his house, Ananthan leads away all the powers to a remote place; understanding his mistake in using the power of nature to destroy, he offers himself to the Goddess. Lightning strikes and burns him alive. The entities destroy the whole mansion of Ananthan. Vishnu and Usha, who seek refuge at the feet of the Goddess, are saved.

== Cast ==
- Mammootty as Anantha Padmanabhan
- Charuhasan as Thevalli (voice by Narendra Prasad)
- K. B. Ganesh Kumar as Vishnu
- Silk Smitha as Ponni
- Parvathy Jayaram as Usha
- Jayabharathi as Malu
- Thilakan as Mekkadan Namboodiri
- Jagannatha Varma as Putthedan Namboodiri
- Jose Prakash as Thirumeni
- Sukumari as Thevalli's wife
- Kiran Vergis as young Anantha Padmanabhan
- Kunchan as Subramani
- Trichur Elsi
- Baby Abhijit Venu as Mythreyan

== Soundtrack ==
The songs were composed by Ilaiyaraaja and lyrics were written by O. N. V. Kurup. The song "Puzhayorathil" was later reused by Ilaiyaraaja as "Sariyo Sariyo" in the Tamil film Engitta Mothathay (1990).

1. "Puzhayorathil" - K. S. Chithra
2. "Ambilikkalayum Neerum" - K. S. Chithra
3. "Om Midhye" - P. Jayachandran, Ilaiyaraaja
4. "Poovayi Virinju" - M. G. Sreekumar, Ilaiyaraaja
