= Chattambikkavala =

- Directed by: N. Sankaran Nair
- Written by: Muttathu Varkey
- Based on: Chattambikkavala by Muttathu Varkey
- Starring: Sathyan; Srividya; Adoor Bhasi; Thikkurissy Sukumaran Nair
- Cinematography: E. N. C. Nair
- Edited by: Gopalakrishnan
- Music by: B. A. Chidambaranath
- Production company: Sreekumar Productions
- Release date: 8 October 1969
- Country: India
- Language: Malayalam

Chattambikkavala is a 1969 Indian Malayalam-language crime thriller film, directed by N. Sankaran Nair and written by Muttathu Varkey. The film stars Sathyan, Srividya, Adoor Bhasi and Thikkurissy Sukumaran Nair. It is based on Muttathu Varkey's novel of the same name.

== Cast ==
- Sathyan as John Joseph
- Srividya as Suzy
- Thikkurissy Sukumaran Nair as Mathachan
- Jose Prakash as Man at beach
- K. V. Shanthi as Thresya
- Bahadoor as Pannan
- K. P. Ummer as Cheriyan
- Meena as Rosamma
- S. P. Pillai as Ponnan

== Soundtrack ==
The music was composed by B. A. Chidambaranath and the lyrics were written by O. N. V. Kurup.

No.	Song	Singers	Lyrics	Length (m:ss)
1	"Anjanakkulir Neela"	K. J. Yesudas, S. Janaki	O. N. V. Kurup	
2	"Anthimalarkkili Koodananju"	K. J. Yesudas, S. Janaki	O. N. V. Kurup	
3	"Mayilppeeli Mizhikalil"	K. J. Yesudas, S. Janaki	O. N. V. Kurup	
4	"Oru Hridayathalikayil"	P. Jayachandran, P. Leela	O. N. V. Kurup	
5	"Oru Muri Meeshakkaaran" (Kuruviyilla Kuruvikkooday)	L. R. Eeswari, Gnanaskandan	O. N. V. Kurup	
