= Swagatham (1989 film) =

1989 film by Venu Nagavally

- Directed by: Venu Nagavally
- Written by: Venu Nagavally
- Screenplay by: Venu Nagavally
- Produced by: K. T. Muhammad for Anand Movie Arts, Padmakumar PS Jagathy.
- Starring: Jayaram; Parvathy; Urvashi; Ashokan; Jagathy Sreekumar; Jagadheesh; Srinath; Nedumudi Venu; Sulakshana; Sukumari, etc.
- Cinematography: Vipin Mohan
- Edited by: K. P. Hariharaputhran
- Music by: Rajamani; Lyrics: Bichu Thirumala
- Production company: Anand Movie Arts
- Distributed by: Anand Movie Arts
- Release date: 3 April 1989
- Country: India
- Language: Malayalam

Swagatham (English: Welcome) is a 1989 Indian Malayalam film, directed by Venu Nagavally and produced by Anand. It stars Jayaram, Urvasi, Ashokan, and Parvathy in the lead roles. The film has musical score by Rajamani.

== Plot ==
The story revolves around Ramaswamy and his younger sister, Veni. A group of friends surround them, including Sudhi, Sajan, and the siblings, Tito and Fifi. Fifi is in love with Sajan while Tito and Veni secretly love each other.

Ramaswamy is utterly dismayed when Veni elopes with Tito. He fails to accept the relationship as Tito is from another religion and considers it a deception. Tito's family accepts the couple and Tito leaves for the Middle East for work.

In the meantime, Sajan leaves Fifi for another girl. It turns out that Fifi is pregnant with his child. The family gets the pregnancy terminated secretly to avoid the shame it brings.

To the shock of everyone, Tito dies in the Middle East when Veni is pregnant. This leaves Veni mentally disturbed and Ramaswamy comes back to support his ailing sister. Veni's condition improves in the care of Fifi and Ramaswamy. Ramaswamy is moved by the compassion Fifi shows towards Veni. The story ends with Ramaswamy inviting Fifi to his life.

== Cast ==
- Jayaram as Ramaswamy Krishnmoorthy
- Urvasi as Filomina Francis aka Fifi
- Ashokan as Tito Francis
- Parvathy Jayaram as Veni Krishnamoorthy
- Nedumudi Venu as Devan Nair
- M. G. Soman as Major Francis
- Sulakshana as Betty
- Sreenath as Sajan
- Jagathy Sreekumar as Sudhi
- Ajayan Adoor as Alex
- Innocent as Chef Charles Stanislaus Labrador
- Sukumari as Daisy Aunty
- Adoor Pankajam as Mrs. Pillai
- Bahadoor as Chellappan Pillai
- Jagadish as Harish
- Jagannathan as Vallabhai
- Ravi Vallathol as Koshy
- Kollam Thulasi as Avarachan, Koshy's Father
- Mamukkoya as Mamukka

== Soundtrack ==
The lyrics were penned by Bichu Thirumala and the music was composed by Rajamani.

| No. | Song | Singers | Lyrics | Length (m:ss) |
|---|---|---|---|---|
| 1 | "Akkare Ninnoru Kottaram" | M. G. Sreekumar, Minmini, M. G. Radhakrishnan, Jagannathan | Bichu Thirumala | 03:52 |
| 2 | "Fifi Fifi" | M. G. Sreekumar, Minmini, Pattanakkad Purushothaman | Bichu Thirumala | 04:27 |
| 3 | "Manjin Chirakulla" | G. Venugopal, M. G. Sreekumar, Minmini | Bichu Thirumala | 04:51 |
