= Monisha Unni =

Indian actress

- Born: Monisha; 24 January 1971; Panniyankara, Kozhikode, Kerala, India
- Died: 5 December 1992 (aged 21); X-ray Junction, National Highway 66 Cherthala, Alappuzha
- Resting place: Bangalore, Karnataka
- Education: Mount Carmel College, Bangalore
- Occupations: Actress; Classical Dancer
- Years active: 1984–1992
- Known for: Nakhakshathangal; Perumthachan; Kamaladalam
- Parent(s): Narayanan Unni; Sreedevi Unni

Monisha Unni (24 January 1971 – 5 December 1992) was an Indian actress, known for her works Predominantly in Malayalam films and in a few Tamil and Kannada films.

Monisha was 16 when she became the youngest actress ever to receive the National Film Award for Best Actress for Nakhakshathangal (1986), her debut feature film. Along with Sharada, Shobhana, Meera Jasmine, and Surabhi Lakshmi. Monisha Unni is one of six Malayalam actresses who have won the National Film Award for Best Actress.

In her short career, Monisha collaborated with directors such as M. T. Vasudevan Nair, Hariharan, Priyadarshan, Ajayan, Kamaluddin Mohammed Majeed and Sibi Malayil.

== Early life ==
Monisha Unni was born in Panniyankara, Kozhikode, in 1971 to Narayanan Unni and Sreedevi Unni. She completed her schooling at St. Charles High School, Bangalore, and Bishop Cotton Girls School, Bangalore. She then completed her graduation in psychology at Mount Carmel College, Bangalore. She had an elder brother, Sajith Unni.

== Death ==
Monisha Unni was working on the Malayalam film Cheppadividya when she died in a car accident. On 5 December 1992, a car carrying Monisha and her mother, Sreedevi Unni, collided with a KSRTC bus at X-Ray Bypass Junction near Cherthala in Alappuzha district of Kerala. She was 21 years old. Monisha was sleeping in the back seat when the accident occurred. Her mother, Sreedevi was thrown out of the car, but escaped with bruises and fractures. Monisha, however, died within minutes due to a cervical fracture of her spine. Reports said Monisha was bleeding through her nose and ears. Although she was taken to the nearby KVM hospital, she had died. The driver of their Ambassador car also died in the accident. After conducting an autopsy at Government Medical College, Alappuzha, her dead body was taken to her home in Bengaluru, where she was cremated. Thousands attended her funeral.

== Career ==
Malayalam novelist M. T. Vasudevan Nair, who is also a screenwriter and film director, was a family friend of Monisha. M.T. was responsible for Monisha's entry into the film industry. She made her debut in Nakhakshathangal (1986), which was written by M. T. and directed by Hariharan. The film portrayed a love triangle involving three teenagers. Monisha's portrayal of Gowri, the film's female protagonist, earned her the National Film Award for Best Actress in 1987.

== Filmography ==
Year	Film	Role	Language	Notes
1984	Paavayya		Tamil	A 16 mm B/W Tamil short film directed by U. S. Vaasan (based on "Vilaivu", a short story by K. I. Rajanarayanan)
1986	Nakhakshathangal	Gowri	Malayalam	National Film Award for Best Actress
1986	Rithubhedam	Thankamani	Malayalam	
1986	Sayam Sandhya	Vinumol	Malayalam	
1987	Pookkal Vidum Thudhu	Gowri	Tamil	
1987	Lawyer Bharathi Devi	Leela	Telugu	
1988	Aryan	Sainabha	Malayalam	
1988	Chiranjeevi Sudhakar	Sandhya	Kannada	Twin role
1988	Chiranjeevi Sudhakar	Sarala	Kannada	Twin role
1988	Kanakambarangal	Sreedevi	Malayalam	
1989	Dravidan	Salma	Tamil	
1989	Adhipan	Geetha	Malayalam	
1990	Kuruppinte Kanakku Pustakom	Sathi	Malayalam	
1990	Veena Meettiya Vilangukal	Sridevi	Malayalam	
1990	Perumthachan	Kunhikkavu Thamburatti	Malayalam	
1990	Kaazhchakkappuram	Ammu	Malayalam	
1991	Venal Kinavukal	Nalini	Malayalam	
1991	Kadavu	Devi	Malayalam	
1992	Unna Nenachen Pattu Padichen	Dhanam	Tamil	
1992	Thalastaanam	Radha	Malayalam	
1992	Oru Kochu Bhoomikulukkam	Viji	Malayalam	
1992	Kudumbasametham	Thulasi	Malayalam	
1992	Kamaladalam	Malavika	Malayalam	
1992	Champakulam Thachan	Ammu	Malayalam	
1992	Cheppadividya	Elsa	Malayalam	
1993	Moondravadhu Kann	Priya	Tamil	
