= Srividya =

Indian actress

- Born: 24 July 1953; Madras, Madras State (now Chennai, Tamil Nadu), India
- Died: 19 October 2006 (aged 53); Thiruvananthapuram, Kerala, India
- Other name: Sreevidya
- Years active: 1966–2006
- Works: Full list
- Spouse: George Thomas (m. 1978; div. 1980)
- Parents: Vikatam R. Krishnamurthy; M. L. Vasanthakumari

Srividya (24 July 1953 – 19 October 2006), was an Indian actress best known for her work predominantly in Malayalam and Tamil films, along with a few Telugu, Kannada and Hindi films. In a career spanning 40 years, she acted in more than 800 films. In the latter part of her career, she concentrated on Malayalam films. In addition to acting, Srividya occasionally worked as a playback singer as well as carnatic singer. She was also a trained Bharathanatyam dancer. She was best known for restraint and subtlety in portrayal of varied emotions. She used her own voice for dubbing in almost all movies in all languages. She died in 2006 after battling with metastatic breast cancer.

== Early life ==
Srividya was born on 24 July 1953 in Madras (now Chennai) into a Tamil family. Tamil film comedian Krishnamurthy and Carnatic classical singer M. L. Vasanthakumari were her parents. She had a brother, Sankararaman. Her father had to stop acting in the year she was born because of a disease which affected his facial muscles. Her family fell into financial crisis. Her mother worked long hours to meet the family's financial needs. Srividya debuted in films at a very early age.

== Acting career ==
Srividya started her career as a child artist in the 1967 Tamil film Thiruvarutchelvar alongside legendary actor Sivaji Ganesan. Later she entered Malayalam films with a dance scene in Kumara Sambhavam (1969), directed by P. Subramaniam and in Telugu film Thatha-Manavadu (1972) directed by Dasari Narayana Rao. However, her first major role was that of a college student falling in love with her professor in the 1971 Tamil film Nootrukku Nooru, directed by K. Balachander. Her first film as heroine was Delhi to Madras (1972) in which she was paired opposite Jaishankar. In the mid-1970s, she became busy in the Tamil film industry. She acted in films such as Velli Vizha, Sollathaan Ninaikkiren and Apoorva Raagangal, all directed by K. Balachander. She was Rajinikanth's first heroine in Apoorva Raagangal (1975).

She started acting in Malayalam in 1969. Her first movie was Chattambikkavala directed by N. Sankaran Nair, in which she acted as the heroine opposite to Sathyan. She gained public attention in Chenda (1973), directed by A. Vincent. Among the south Indian language movies she acted in, the maximum number of movies was in Malayalam (1969 to 2003).

She portrayed Chottanikkara Devi in the Movies Chottanikkara Amma and Amme Narayana. Her role as Amba mythological character from the mythological story (adapted film) from the Mahabharata, Amba Ambika Ambalika (1976), has been appreciated.

== Playback singing ==
Srividya was a playback singer as well. She first sang for films in the Tamil film Amaran and then for Malayalam film Ayalathe Sundari, along with Kishore Kumar. She later sang in several films, such as Oru Painkilikkadha, Njangalude Kochu Doctor, Rathilayam and Nakshathratharattu.

She was an expert classical vocalist as well. She used to sing in functions such as the Soorya Festival. She was mainly trained by her mother, who was one among the female trinity in Carnatic music, along with M. S. Subbulakshmi and D. K. Pattammal.

== Personal life ==
Srividya acted in many films including Annai Velankanni, Unarchigal and Apoorva Raagangal with Kamal Haasan. Srividya and Kamal Haasan fell in love and Kamal Haasan proposed to her. Srividya's mother stopped them from getting married. A few years later Kamal began courting Vani Ganapathy and they got married which was a great disappointment for Srividya. During this period she fell in love with film director Bharathan who made many films with her as the female lead. But they couldn't continue the relationship and eventually Bharathan married K.P.A.C. Lalitha.

Later she fell in love with George Thomas, an assistant director in her Malayalam film Teekkanal. She married him on 19 January 1978 despite opposition from her family. As George wished, she was baptised before the marriage. She wanted to stay as a housewife, but had to return to acting, when George forced her to, citing financial issues. She soon realised that she had made a wrong decision in marrying him. Her life became miserable and the marriage ended in divorce in 1980. After her divorce she continued acting in movies (mainly Malayalam). She had to fight and seek legal action against George Thomas as he had snatched all her properties, even her awards, from her. Hence, the divorce with George Thomas was followed by a prolonged legal battle to settle financial issues between the two. The case went up to the Supreme Court of India, where she won in the final verdict. After the case was closed, she left Chennai and settled in Thiruvananthapuram, where she lived for the rest of her life.

== Death ==
In 2003, she underwent a biopsy test following physical problems and was diagnosed with metastatic breast cancer. She underwent treatment for three years. Two months before her death on 17 August 2006, Srividya had executed a will and entrusted K. B. Ganesh Kumar, cine actor and MLA, to register a charitable society to ‘start a music and dance school for efficient students who could not get ample opportunities due to lack of money or to give away scholarship to such students to continue their studies and to extend financial assistance to deserving ailing artistes.’

"I am bequeathing all my properties except some payments mentioned elsewhere in this will. An appropriate body with eminent persons, registered under Charitable Societies Act should be formed and the realised value of all my assets should be transferred as a nucleus fund," she said in the will entrusting Ganesh Kumar to register the society.

She had also left five lakh rupees each to her brother's children and one lakh rupees each to her servants in the will, executed on 17 August 2006. In October 2006, she underwent chemotherapy, but cancer had already spread throughout her body, and she died at 19:45 on 19 October 2006, aged 53. She was cremated with full state honours at the Brahmana Samooham crematorium in Karamana.6

== Awards ==
Year	Award	Category	Work / Notes
1975	Filmfare Awards South	Special Award – South	Apoorva Raagangal (Tamil)
1977	Tamil Nadu State Film Awards	Special Prize	Madhurageetham
1979	Kerala State Film Awards	Best Actress	Edavazhiyile Poocha Minda Poocha, Jeevitham Oru Gaanam
1979	Kerala Film Critics Association Awards	Best Actress	Idavazhiyile Poocha Minda Poocha
1979	Filmfare Awards South	Best Actress – Malayalam	Edavazhiyile Poocha Mindapoocha
1980	Filmfare Awards South	Best Actress – Malayalam	Puzha
1983	Kerala State Film Awards	Best Actress	Rachana
1985	Kerala State Film Awards	Second Best Actress	Irakal
1986	Kerala State Film Awards	Second Best Actress	Ennennum Kannettante
1991	Cinema Express Awards	Best Character Actress	Thalapathi (Tamil)
1991	Film Fans Association Awards - Tamil	Best character actress	Thalapathi
1992	Kerala State Film Awards	Best Actress	Daivathinte vikrithikal
1992	Tamil Nadu State Film Awards	MGR Award	—
2004	Kerala State Television Awards	Best Actress	Avicharithum
2005	Kerala Film Critics Association Awards	Chalachitra Prathibha Award	—

Government Honours

- 1977: Received title of Kalaimamani Award by the Government of Tamil Nadu, which is the highest state honour in the field of Arts.

== TV serials ==
Year	Film	Channel	Language	Notes
	Engae Aval		Tamil	
	Lakshmi Vanthachi		Tamil	Television film
	Ammayude Makan		Malayalam	Television film
1991	Penn	DD	Tamil	1st episode
1991	Oorarinda Rahasiyam		Tamil	
	Galatta Kudumbam		Tamil	
1996	Mohana Darsanam	DD	Malayalam	
1998	Uravugal	Vijay TV	Tamil	
1999	Ariyathe	Sheela	Malayalam	Television film
2001	Venalmazha	Surya TV	Malayalam	
2001	Durga		Malayalam	
2002–2003	Snehadooram	Asianet (TV channel)	Malayalam	
2003–2004	Vasundhara Medicals	Asianet (TV channel)	Malayalam	
2003–2004	Swapnam	Asianet (TV channel)	Malayalam	
2004–2005	Avicharitham	Asianet	Malayalam	
2004	Sthreehrudayam	Surya TV	Malayalam	
2005	Omanathinkal Pakshi	Asianet	Malayalam	
2006	Ammathamburatti	Asianet	Malayalam	
2006	Dial 100 Police Story		Malayalam	Archive footage
2021	Priyankari	Flowers TV	Malayalam	Archive footage
2021	Kanyadanam	Surya TV	Malayalam	Archive footage
2023	Ninnishtam Ennishtam	Surya TV	Malayalam	Archive footage
