= Suresh Babu (screenwriter) =

Indian film screenwriter and artist

S Suresh Babu
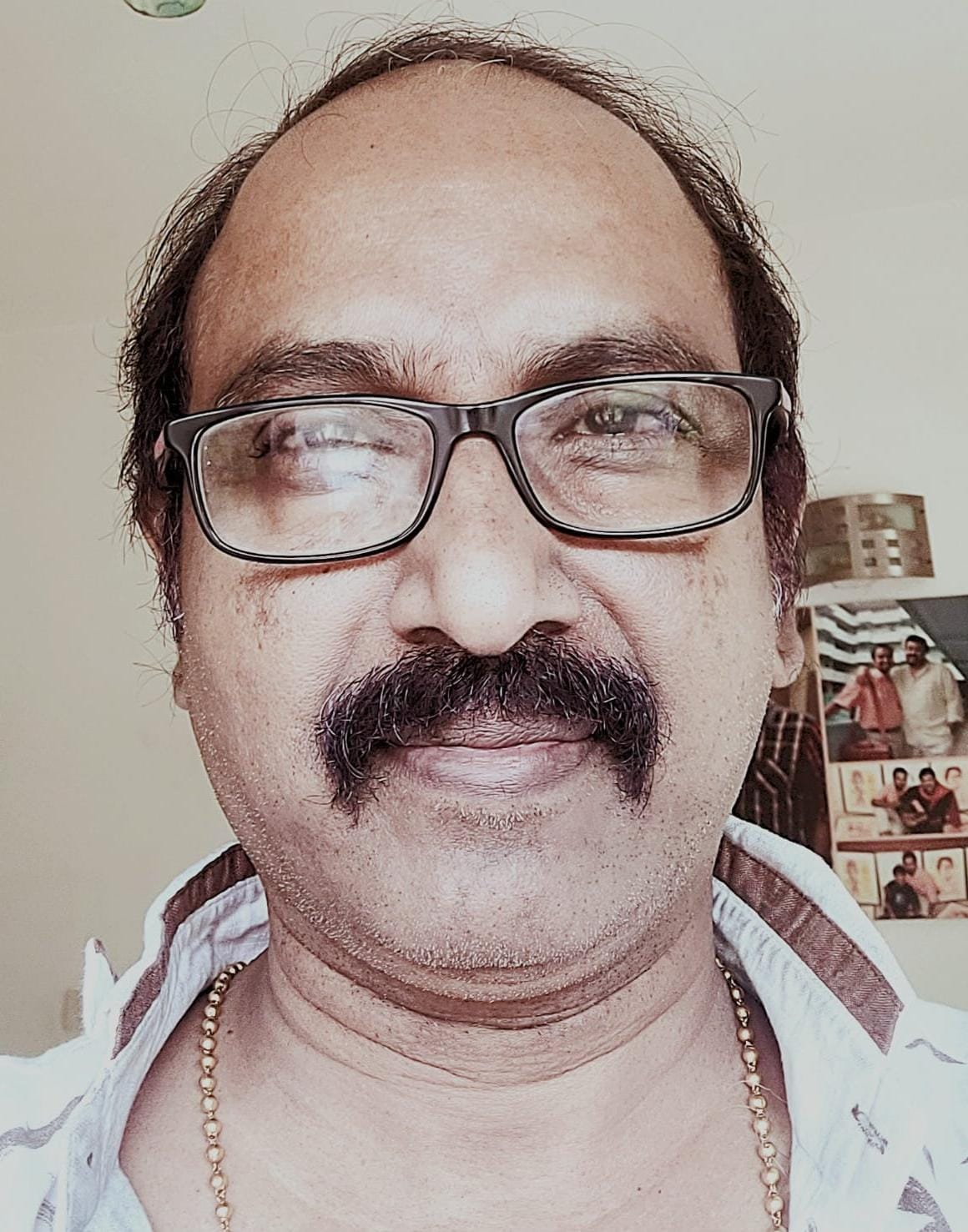
- S Suresh Babu
- Born: Vallamkulam, Pathanamthitta, Kerala, India
- Education: Fine Arts College, Thiruvanathapuram; Mar Thoma College, Tiruvalla
- Occupations: screenwriter; Artist
- Years active: 2005–present
- Spouse: Sindhu K Suresh

S Suresh Babu is an Indian film screenwriter and artist who predominantly works in Malayalam cinema. He made his debut as a writer in the movie Dada Sahib in the year 2000, with Director Vinayan and actor Mammootty. Since then, he has worked on movies like Shikkar (2010), Thiruvambadi Thamban (2012), Nadan (2013), Jalam (2016) and Oruthee (2022). The movie Oruthee acted by Navya Nair marked her return to Malayalam cinema after 10 years and it was a commercial success.

== Career ==
Suresh Babu, an alumnus of the College of Fine Arts in Trivandrum, commenced his career as a columnist and writer with leading Malayalam newspapers and magazines. His foray into Malayalam cinema dates back over three decades to the year 1990 when he made his debut as an art director in the film Vembanad, directed by Kaviyoor Sivaprasad and featuring the iconic Malayalam actress, Ms. Jayabharathi in the lead role. This experimental film without dialogues won Kerala State Film Award – Special Jury Award in 1990. This movie also boasts the involvement of renowned Indian film professionals; cinematography is done by Ashwini Kaul, editing by Renu Saluja and music by Louis Banks.

Since then, Suresh has contributed significantly to the Malayalam film industry, scripting and screenwriting numerous commercial blockbusters alongside renowned directors and producers. Some of his notable works include Dada Sahib with Mammootty, Shikkar, Thandavam and Kanal, with Mohanlal, Nadan, Thiruvambadi Thamban, and Sir C.P with Jayaram, Film Star, The Reporter, Jalam, Oruthee and Live.

In addition to his achievements in filmmaking, Suresh Babu has earned acclaim in the industry, receiving the Film Critics award for best writer for the film-related article. With a career spanning over three decades, Suresh ventures into the world of film production as well.

== As an Artist ==
In addition to his career in the film industry, Suresh Babu has also gained recognition as an accomplished illustrator. He collaborated with prestigious Malayalam magazines, including Mangalam, Vanitha, and D.C. Books (Printed Magazines).

Suresh Babu is a curated painter in his own right, and his artworks have found their way into the boardrooms, lobbies, and drawing rooms of various corporate companies and heritage hotels across Kerala. One of his most acclaimed projects consisted of a series of 100 paintings depicting the history of the Travancore Kingdom, which are displayed at the Travancore Hotel in Cochin.

As a specialist in caricature art, Babu's most renowned collection features 75 caricatures of the renowned Mohanlal. His caricatures are based on the defining characters portrayed by Mohanlal during his four-decade career.

Suresh Babu also worked as Freelance Columnist in Chithrabhumi, Mathrubhumi, Madhyamam and Rashtra Deepika Cinema.

== Early life ==
Suresh Babu was born in Vallamkulam, Pathanamthitta. He attended National High School, Vallamkulam, and completed his pre-degree education at Mar Thoma College, Tiruvalla and later graduated with a bachelor's degree in Fine Arts from Fine Arts College, Thiruvanathapuram in 1991.

== Personal life ==
Suresh Babu is married to Sindhu. K Suresh and they have two children.

== Filmography ==
Year	Title	Director	Credited as			Notes
Year	Title	Director	Story	Screenplay	Dialogue	Notes
2000	Dada Sahib	Vinayan	No	Yes	Yes	
2002	Thandavam	Shaji Kailas	Yes	Yes	Yes	
2005	Five Fingers	Sanjeev Raj	Yes	Yes	Yes	
2008	Swarnam	Venugopan	Yes	Yes	Yes	
2009	Swapnamaalika	KA Devarajan	No	Yes	Yes	
2010	Shikkar	M Padmakumar	Yes	Yes	Yes	
2011	The Filmstaar	Sanjeev Raj	Yes	Yes	Yes	
2012	Thiruvambadi Thampan	M Padmakumar	Yes	Yes	Yes	
2013	Nadan	Kamal	Yes	Yes	Yes	
2015	The Reporter	Venugopan	Yes	Yes	Yes	
2015	Sir CP	Shajoon Karyal	Yes	Yes	Yes	
2015	Kanal	M Padmakumar	Yes	Yes	Yes	
2016	Jalam	M Padmakumar	Yes	Yes	Yes	
2022	Oruthee	V. K. Prakash	Yes	Yes	Yes	
2023	Live	V. K. Prakash	Yes	Yes	Yes	
2023	Manoharanum Janakiyum	Suresh Babu	No	No	No	Announced
2024	Arabikkadalinte Rani	M Padmakumar, Suresh Babu	Yes	Yes	Yes	
2026	Pallichattambi	Dijo Jose Antony	Yes	No	No	

== Awards ==
NCERT National award for best Illustrator in 1998.

State Award for best Illustrator for Children.

Bhima balasahithya award for best Children's Illustration in 1967 and 1996.
