= M. G. Sreekumar =

Indian singer

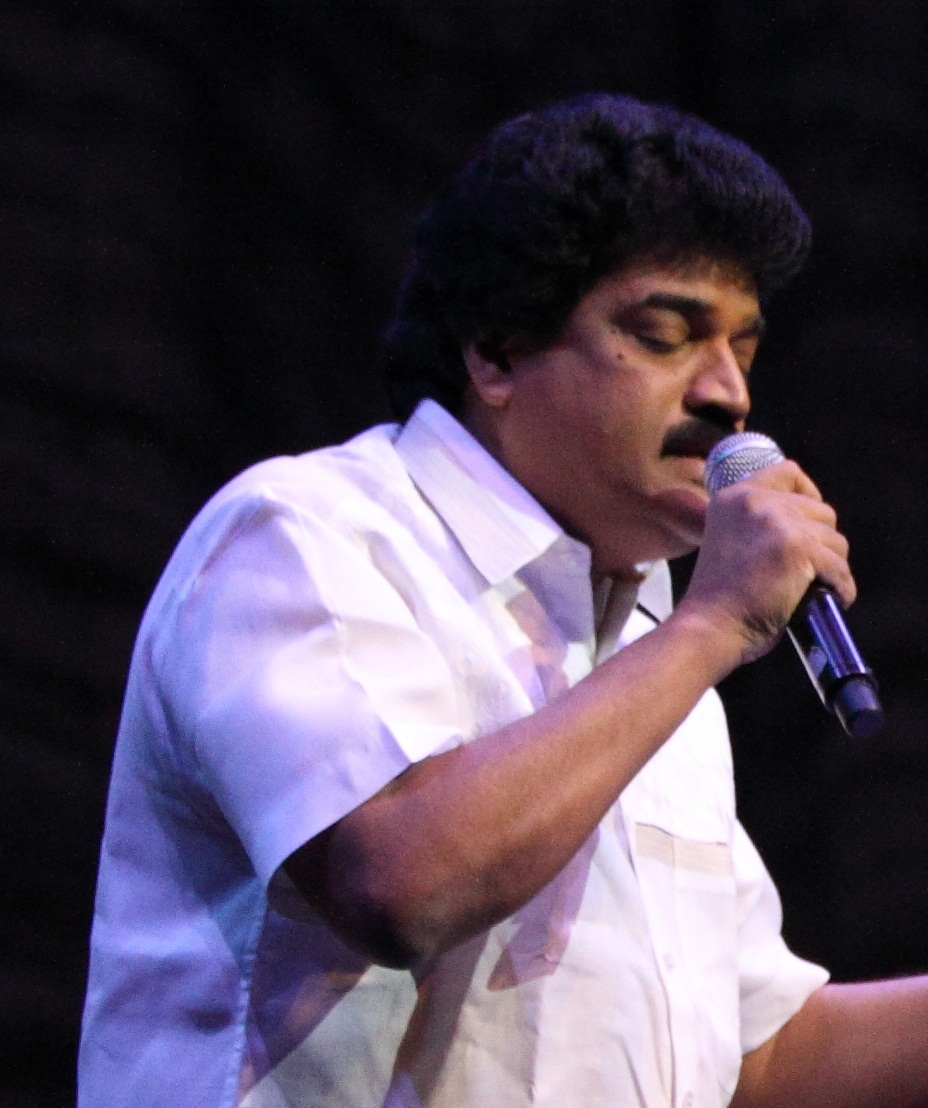
- Born: Malabar Gopalan Nair Sreekumar; 25 May 1957 (age 69); Haripad, Alappuzha, Kerala, India
- Occupations: Singer; composer; music producer; film producer; TV host
- Years active: 1978– present
- Spouse: Lekha Sreekumar (m. 2000)
- Parents: M. Gopalan Nair (father); Kamalakshi Amma (mother)
- Relatives: K. Omanakutty (sister); M. G. Radhakrishnan (brother); M. R. Rajakrishnan (nephew); K. S. Harisankar (sororal grandnephew)
- Awards: See below
- Musical career
- Genres: Playback singing; Filmi
- Instrument: Vocals
- Labels: Magnasound; MC Audios; MG Sound and Frames
- Website: mgsreekumar.in

Malabar Gopalan Nair Sreekumar (born 25 May 1957), better known as M. G. Sreekumar is an Indian playback singer, composer, music producer, television presenter and film producer, who works predominantly in Malayalam cinema. He has sung more than 2500 songs in various Indian languages including Malayalam, Tamil, Telugu, Kannada, Hindi, and Sanskrit. He owns a music company named KMG Musics and the Saregama School of Music in Thiruvananthapuram.In October 2024 he was appointed as the Director of the Music Academy of the UAE Government. Sreekumar has won several awards, including two National Film Awards, three Kerala State Film Awards and 5 Filmfare Awards South. He was also honoured with the Harivarasanam Award by the Government of Kerala in 2016. His career as a singer spans over 44 years.

== Career ==
Sreekumar made his debut in the Malayalam movie Coolie (1983) Directed by Ashok Kumar. The Malayalam movie Chithram (1988) directed by Priyadarshan, starring Mohanlal, was the first where Sreekumar sang all the songs. He has sung more than 3000 songs for films in Malayalam, Tamil, Hindi, Kannada and Telugu.

He worked as music director in Malayalam films such as Chathurangam (2002) and Thandavam (2002), Priyadarshan's Kanchivaram (2008), Mohanlal's Alexander the Great and Oru Naal Varum.

He anchored a TV show named SaReGaMa on Asianet and was a judge for the reality show Idea Star Singer. Now he is a judge in Top Singer on Flowers TV.

His appointment as chairman of Kerala Sangeeta Nataka Akademi by the LDF government of Kerala sparked controversy due to his close relations with its political rival BJP.

== Personal life ==
Sreekumar was born on 25 May 1957, at Haripad, in Alappuzha district, Kerala as the younger son of music composer and harmonist Malabar Gopalan Nair and Harikatha exponent Kamalakshi Amma. He is the younger brother of popular music director M. G. Radhakrishnan and popular Carnatic musician Dr. K. Omanakkutty. Sreekumar and Lekha, his future wife, first saw each other in 1988 at Thycaud Dharma Sastha Temple, Thiruvananthapuram, but they met each other only few days later after a concert. Gradually, they developed friendship and later began living together. Sreekumar and Lekha married on 14 January 2000 at the Mookambika Temple, Kollur.

== Discography ==
=== As singer ===
==== Malayalam (partial list) ====
The following is a list of films in which M. G. Sreekumar has contributed as a playback singer. If a film has only one song performed by him, it is specified where necessary.

- Novemberinte Nashtam (1982)
- Coolie (1983)
- Poochakkoru Mookkuthi (1984)
- Onnanam Kunnil Oradi Kunnil (1985)
- Pranamam (1986)
- Ayalvasi Oru Daridravasi (1986)
- Thalavattam (1986)
- Manivathoorile Aayiram Sivarathrikal (1987)
- Anantara (1987)
- Moonnam Pakkam (1988)
- Oru Muthassi Katha (1988)
- Mukunthetta Sumitra Vilikkunnu (1988)
- Janmandharam (1988)
- Aryan (1988)
- Chithram (1988)
- Ramji Rao Speaking (1989)
- Oru Sayahnathinte Swapnam (1989)
- News (1989)
- Nair Saab (1989)
- Mahayanam (1989)
- Kireedam (1989)
- Dasharatham (1989)
- Vadakkunokkiyanthram (1989)
- Adarvam (1989)
- Varthamana Kalam (1990)
- Rajavazhcha (1990)
- Kadathanadan Ambadi (1990) (singer)
- Indrajaalam (1990)
- His Highness Abdullah (1990)
- Dr. Pasupathy (1990)
- Appu (1990)
- Akkare Akkare Akkare (1990)
- PavaKoothu (1990)
- In Harihar Nagar (1990)
- Oliyampukal (1990)
- Vishnulokam (1991)
- Ulladakkam (1991)
- Kuttapathram (1991)
- Kilukkampetti (1991)
- Abhimanyu (1991)
- Godfather (1991)
- Kilukkam (1991)
- Ennathe Programme (1991)
- Chanchattam (1991)
- Advaitham (1991)
- Maanthrika Cheppu (1992)
- Champakulam Thachan (1992)
- Yoddha (1992)
- Welcome to Kodaikanal (1992)
- Brahmadathan (1993, unreleased)
- Gardish (1993)
- Vietnam Colony (1993)
- Midhunam (1993)
- Devasuram (1993)
- Thenmavin Kombath (1994)
- Pingami (1994)
- Hey Hero (1994)
- Pavithram (1994)
- Kashmeeram (1994)
- Kaalapaani (1994)
- Sadaram (1995)
- Manikya Chempazhukka (1995)
- Nirnayam (1995)
- Madamma (1996)
- Aniyathipravu (1997)
- Chandralekha (1997)
- Superman (1997)
- Manthramothiram (1997)
- Lelam (1997)
- Krishnagudiyil Oru Pranayakalathu (1997)
- The Good Boys (1997)
- Gajaraja Manthram (1997)
- Ekkareyanente Manasam (1997)
- Bhoopathi (1997)
- Chandralekha (1997)
- Mayajalam (1998)
- Mangalya Pallakku (1998)
- Summer In Bethlehem (1998)
- En Swasa Kaatre (1999)
- Ezhupunna Tharakan (1999)
- Olympian Anthony Adam (1999)
- Valliettan (2000)
- Dada Sahib (2000)
- Taj Mahal (2000)
- Thenkasipattanam (2000)
- Narasimham (2000)
- Vasanthiyum Lakshimiyum Pinne Njanum (2001)
- Karumadikkuttan (2001)
- Kakkakuyil (2001)
- Megasandesam (2001)
- Ee Parakkum Thalika (2001)
- Akasthile Paravakal (2001)
- Ravanaprabhu (2001)
- Videsi Nair Swadesi Nair (2002)
- Valkannadi (2002)
- Pranayamanithooval (2002)
- Mazhathullikkilukkam (2002)
- Jagathi Jagathish in Town (2002)
- Meesa Madhavan (2002)
- Kalyanaraman (2002)
- Chronic Bachelor (2003)
- Swapnam Kondu Thulabharam (2003)
- Pattalam (2003)
- Hariharan Pillai Happy Aanu (2003)
- Ammakilikkoodu (2003)
- Pattanathil Sundaran (2003)
- Chakram (2003)
- Relax (2003)
- Vamanapuram Bus Route (2004)
- Thekkekara Super Fast (2004)
- Natturajavu (2004)
- Jalolsavam (2004)
- Vettam (2004)
- Black (2004)
- Naran (2005)
- Thanmathra (2005)
- Vadakkumnadhan (2006)
- Prajapathi (2006)
- Keerthi Chakra (2006)
- Classmates (2006)
- Hallo (2007)
- Chocolate (2007)
- Bhool Bhulaiyaa (2007)
- College Kumaran (2008)
- Innathe Chintha Vishayam (2008)
- Kurukshetra (2008)
- Sagar alias Jacky Reloaded (2009)
- In Ghost House Inn (2010)
- Alexander the Great (2010)
- Oru Naal Varum (2010)
- Kandahar (2010)
- Living Together (2011)
- Chinatown (2011)
- 1993 Bombay, March 12 (2011)
- Oru Marubhoomikkadha (2011)
- Ninnishtam Ennishtam 2 (2011)
- Kunjaliyan (2012)
- Simhasanam (2012)
- Husbands in Goa (2012)
- Karmayodha (2012)
- Geethaanjali (2013)
- Aamayum Muyalum (2014)
- Ottayaan (2015)
- Oppam (2016)
- 1971: Beyond Borders (2017)
- Velipadinte Pusthakam (2017)
- Panchavarnathatha (2018)
- Odiyan (2018)
- Neerali (2018)
- Madhaveeyam (2019)
- Nithyaharitha Nayakan (2019)
- Pathinettam Padi (2019)
- Pattabhiraman (2019)
- Ittymaani: Made in China (2019)
- School Diary (2019)
- Big Brother (2020)
- Marakkar Arabikadalinte Simham (2021)
- Minnal Murali (2021)
- Bro Daddy (2022)
- Aarattu (2022)
- Pappachan Olivilanu (2023)
- Thudarum (2025)

==== Tamil ====
Year	Film	Song(s)
1991	MGR Nagaril	Singara Paavaiye
1995	Mogamul	Nenje Gurunathrin
1995	Mogamul	Sollayo Vaai
1996	Siraichaalai	Suttum Sudar
1999	Taj Mahal	Karisal Tharisal
1999	Kadhalar Dhinam	Daandiyaa Aattamumaada
1999	Kadhalar Dhinam	Nenaichchapadi
1999	En Swasa Kaatre	En Swasa Kaatre
1999	En Swasa Kaatre	Chinna Chinna Mazhaithuli
2001	Majunu	Pinju Thendrale
2007	En Uyirinum Melana	Oru Nimidam

==== Telugu ====
Year	Film	Song(s)
1994	Gandeevam	Goruvakana
1999	Premikula Roju	Dhaandiya
1999	Premikula Roju	Manasu Padi
2000	Kodanda Ramudu	Sannajaji Theega
2000	Kodanda Ramudu	Kodanda Ramayyaku

==== Hindi ====
Year	Film	Song(s)
1992	Muskurahat	Soja Soja
1992	Muskurahat	Apni Jeb
1998	Kabhi Na Kabhi	Tu Hi Tu
1998	Dil Se..	Jiya Jale
1998	Saat Rang Ki Sapne	Saat Rang
1998	Doli Saja Ke Rakhna	Kissa Hum
2001	Yeh Tera Ghar Yeh Mera Ghar	Hasta Hua
2007	Bhool Bhulaiyaa	Mera Dholna

=== As composer ===
Beside films, Sreekumar has composed many devotional albums. Majority of his songs are written by Rajeev Alunkal and Gireesh Puthenchery.

Year	Title	Language
2002	Thandavam	Malayalam
2002	Chathurangam	Malayalam
2008	Kanchivaram	Tamil
2008	Poi Solla Porom	Tamil
2010	Alexander the Great	Malayalam
2010	Bumm Bumm Bole	Hindi
2010	Rakhupathi Raghava Rajaram	Malayalam
2010	Oru Naal Varum	Malayalam
2010	Sakudumbam Shyamala	Malayalam
2010	Penpattanam	Malayalam
2011	Sarkar Colony	Malayalam
2011	Oru Marubhoomikkadha	Malayalam
2011	Thamarassery to Thailand	Malayalam
2011	Sneham + Ishtam = Amma	Malayalam
2012	Njanum Ente Familiyum	Malayalam
2012	Kunjaliyan	Malayalam
2012	Husbands in Goa	Malayalam
2012	Ardhanaari	Malayalam
2012	Karmayodha	Malayalam
2013	Good Bad & Ugly	Malayalam

== Television ==
Year	Title	Role	Channel	Notes
1996-1999	Voice Of The Week	Anchor; Judge	Asianet	
2000-2013	Sarigamapadanisa /SaReGaMa	Anchor	Asianet	
2004	Kadamattathu kathanar	Singer in church(Special appearance)	Asianet	
2007— 2014	Star Singer season 2 — 7	Judge	Asianet	
2008	Star Singer Junior	Judge	Asianet	
2012-2013	Lunars Comedy Express	Judge	Asianet Plus	
2013	Champions	Judge	Surya Tv	
2014	Surya Singer season 1	Judge	Surya TV	
2015	Aarpoo erroo	Judge	Kairali TV	
2015	Surya Challenge	Team Captain	Surya TV	
2017-2018	Comedy Stars season 2	Judge	Asianet	
2018-2025	Top Singer season 1 — 5	Judge	Flowers TV	
2020–2023	Parayam Nedam	Anchor	Amrita TV	
2021	Top Singer Star Night	Judge	Flowers TV	
2021	Sing N Win	Judge	Flowers USA	
2021	Music Ulsav	Judge	Flowers TV	
2021	Eenangalude Gandharvan	Anchor	Flowers TV	
2023-2024	Paadam Nedam Panam Nedam	Anchor	Amrita TV	
2024	Super Ammayum Makalum	Judge	Amrita TV	Grand finale jury panel

== Awards ==
National Film Awards:

- 1990 – Best Male Playback Singer – His Highness Abdullah (Song: "Nadha Roopini")
- 1999 – Best Male Playback Singer – Vasanthiyum Lakshmiyum Pinne Njanum (Song: "Chanthu Pottum")

Kerala State Film Awards:

- 1989 – Best Male Playback Singer – Kireedam (Song: "Kanneer Poovinte") and Vadakkunokkiyantram (Song: "Mayamayooram Peeliveeshiyo")
- 1991 – Best Male Playback Singer – Kilukkam (Song: "Kilukil Pambaram") and Thudarkkadha (Song: "Aathiravaravayi")
- 1992 – Best Playback Singer – Different films

Kerala Film Critics Awards

- 1998 – Best Male Playback Singer — Kottaram Veettile Apputtan, Punjabi House, Summer in Bethlehem
- 1999 – Best Male Playback Singer — Megham, Chandranudikkunna Dikkil, Vasanthiyum Lakshmiyum Pinne Njaanum
- 2000 – Best Male Playback Singer — Kattu Vannu Vilichappol
- 2001 – Best Male Playback Singer — Achaneyanenikkishtam, Praja
- 2002 – Best Male Playback Singer — Nandanam
- 2005 – Best Male Playback Singer — Mayookham, Balyam
- 2006 – Best Male Playback Singer — Keerthi Chakra, Pothan Vava
- 2011 – Best Music Director — Oru Marubhoomikkadha

Filmfare Awards South:

- 2016 – Filmfare Award for Best Male Playback Singer – Malayalam – Oppam – "Chinnamma"

Asianet Film Awards:

- 2003 – Best Male Playback Singer – Manassinakkare
- 2005 – Best Male Playback Singer – Thanmathra, Ananthabhadram
- 2008 – Best Male Playback – Innathe Chintha Vishayam
- 2010 – Best Music Director – Oru Naal Varum

Surya TV Awards:

- 2008 – Best Playback Singer – Innathe Chintha Vishayam
- 2010 – Best Playback Singer – Oru Naal Varum

Other awards:

- 2008 – Raju Pilakkattu Memorial Award
- 2008 – Jeevan TV – P. Jayachandran Award
- 2010 – Asiavision Movie Award for Best Music Director – Oru Naal Varum
- 2011 – Swaralaya Kairali Yesudas Award
- 2016 – Harivarasanam Award
- 2016 – Asiavision Award for Best Male Singer - Minungum Minnaminunge from the movie "Oppam"
- 2016 – Mazhavil Mango Music Awards - Special Jury Award - Chinnamma from the movie "Oppam"
- 2023 – V. M. Kutty Award instituted by the Ishal Samskarika Samithi
