= Kanal (2015 film) =

- Theatrical release poster
- Directed by: M. Padmakumar
- Screenplay by: S. Suresh Babu
- Produced by: Abraham Mathew
- Starring: Mohanlal; Anoop Menon; Atul Kulkarni; Pratap Pothen
- Narrated by: Prithviraj Sukumaran
- Cinematography: Vinod Illampally
- Edited by: Ranjan Abraham
- Music by: Ouseppachan
- Production companies: Abaam Movies; Aashirvad Cinemas
- Distributed by: Maxlab Cinemas and Entertainments (India)
- Release date: 22 October 2015 (India)
- Running time: 158 minutes
- Country: India
- Language: Malayalam

Kanal (English: Ember) is a 2015 Indian Malayalam-language drama thriller film, directed by M. Padmakumar and written by S. Suresh Babu. The film stars Mohanlal and Anoop Menon in lead roles. Atul Kulkarni, Pratap Pothen, Honey Rose, Nikita Thukral, Gowri Nandha and Sheelu Abraham play supporting roles. The film was produced by Abaam Movies in association with Aashirvad Cinemas. Ouseppachan and Vinu Thomas composed the soundtrack. The principal photography commenced in May 2015 in Kochi and completed in August. Kochi, Hyderabad, Karwar, Goa and Qatar were the filming locations. The film released in India on 22 October 2015.

== Plot ==
The story is set against the backdrop of a global recession in the United Arab Emirates. The story revolves around a thriller –- revenge plot that has resulted from the recession. The story explores the basic nature of cruelty and love in human nature through the lives of four individuals: John David, Ananda Raman, Raghuchandran and Kuruvila Mathew.

The story starts in a train journey, where John David, Ananda Raman are travelling in the second class. John talks to various passengers, picks up a conversation with Anantharaman and tells him, that he has seen him somewhere. The train breaks down and everyone gets down to have refreshment. John suggests Ananda Raman, that they hop on to a passing lorry and then take a taxi. Meanwhile, John identifies him as the owner of Pravasi Malayalam channel in Dubai sometimes back. They reach a nearby town by lorry and take a room in a local lodge. That night they drink together and shares each other's story. John works as an animator, in a big concern. During his childhood he fell in love Anna in Assam. He lived in orphanage where Anna used to visit with her father. When he was ten years, her family moved due to her father's transfer. John studied and moved out of orphanage, got job. Later at the age of 36, he moved to Dubai for a job, there he meets Anna again. He learns that she is married. At times, he meets her. Suddenly Anna and her husband meets with an accident where her husband dies. John feels lucky, proposes to Anna after all the rituals get over. He feels that life has given him his chance for waiting so long. He marries Anna. Now he asks Ananda Raman, as why is he upset and what is bothering him. Ananda Raman shares his flashback. He runs a channel in Kerala, where all news is given accurately. He takes the loan and arranges for fund, and opens a new channel in Dubai. His wife asks him if this move is required and is it safe. He wants to make big in life. He moves to Dubai to run the channel. A big recession strikes UAE where almost all contractors lose their job and are asked to leave. Most of their visas are cancelled and are deported asap. Ananda Raman's channel keeps capturing this news. He also runs short of fund for the channel and is unable to pay the debt, and one day he has to return to Kerala. His sudden visit worries his wife. The money lenders chase him over phone and threatens, he changes his house, phone number. He and his wife have a heated argument and he leaves the house. Now he is on the run.

John suggests him that, if he accompanies him to Karwar the next day, who knows god might give him the money he needed. They both go to sleep and head to Karwar next day morning by a car. They arrive at an estate, meets Raghuchandran and his family. John and Raghu's daughter met in Facebook a year back and had been talking on a resort proposal. This meeting is to materialize that. The daughter and John shares an intimate moment. A big party hosted. Later that night after everyone leaves, John threatens Raghu and asks to transfer all his money to an account, after showing him a photo. Raghu is shocked. He obliges and his wife is also next to him. they hand over all the cash at home to him. His daughter walks to that room and get shocked too by seeing the photo. Once the money is transferred, John kills all three of them.

John calls Ananda Raman on his cell and asks him to join upstairs. Once he reaches he shoots a video of him holding the dying daughter. Now they both pack up and leave from there. Ananda Raman shouts in the car while travelling. John stops the car, Ananda Raman gets out of the car, and argues with him. John yells saying that it is fate to be here. Throws a bag at him which has money and leaves from there.

Meanwhile, an actress is found dead near a train track in her car. Her husband Kuruvila Mathew is informed, he flies from UAE to India for the identification. He watches all the CCTV footage after he gets to know that all the money in his account has been transferred 30 minutes before her death. He finds a man in the video, spending lot of time with his wife in their house. Kuruvila calls Raghu and tries to inform, but it was too late. Kuruvila reaches Karwar to find out all three are dead. Here also he watches the party video recording and finds the same person. He tries to track him down after seeing Ananda Raman next to the new person.

Ananda Raman after reaching his home, reconciles with his wife, his father-in-law promises to help him out of debt. He hides the money which was given by John. Kuruvila gets in contact with Ananda Raman, meets him and tells that he saw the video recording. He also tells that he is John's next target. Ananda Raman confesses that he has no knowledge of why John is doing this.

Later that day, Ananda Raman sees John following Kuruvila, and he also follows. All three reach Kuruvila's house. John asks Kuruvila to confess what he knows.

Kuruvila shares that, during the recession both Kuruvila and Raghu with their families were to be deported, when Anna's father saw them in the high commission and helped them to arrange the visa. Both families did not want to go out of UAE, they were paranoid about the fact to return to India and do what for their living. They were jealous on Anna's family of how rich they were and how sophisticated they were. That's when they planned to murder the whole family after looting their money.

John told that the family killed by Kuruvila and the others was his wife, her father, mother and four infants. Kuruvila and his wife threatened Anna's father to transfer the money and asked them to board the car. Once all of them boarded, they filled the car with carbon monoxide and killed them. They escaped with more than 756 million dirhams.

When this news reached John who was in Assam for a project, he travelled back and started digging as the money went missing. He was devastated to see his infants in the mortuary. He has not even met them due to his tight deadline in the project. Hence he traced all the clues, tracked each one of them and took revenge for what was done to his family. He befriended Raghu's daughter over Facebook and earned her trust, meanwhile kept meeting Kuruvila's wife, impressed her, gained her trust and made her transfer the money, after which he killed her in the car, by suffocating her with John's hand, seen him wearing a glove and covers the murder by making the car filled with carbon monoxide, to disguise the murder, making it seem like an accident.

Next was Raghu's family at Karwar, now Kuruvila. He makes him drink poison. He falls down, dead from the chair he was sitting on after drinking. Now he holds his leg and tells, you are finished John. John tells Ananda Raman that he has been the witness as the Anna family car accident case was brainstormed in Ananda Raman's channel in UAE, where he gave a verdict as accident. Kuruvila's wife indirectly paid him to give such verdict.

Kuruvila livecasted this whole thing in Facebook from his CCTV. The case was dismissed, after a few years. Ananda Raman, a book writer now, is nominated for his book Paid news is paid murder. He thanks John for all his support and guidance in another train journey.

== Cast ==
- Mohanlal as John David
- Anoop Menon as Anantharaman
- Atul Kulkarni as Kuruvila Mathew
- Pratap Pothen as Hilltop Raghu / Raghuchandran
- Jose as Joseph
- Nikita Thukral as Reenu Kuruvila
- Honey Rose as Anna John David
- Sheelu Abraham as Revathy
- Gowri Nandha as Anamika
- Innocent as Natarajan
- Santhosh Keezhattoor as Sathyan, Anantharaman's friend
- Ambika Mohan
- Ravi Mariya
- Sadiq as Sudhi
- Kochu Preman as Harish
- Anjali Nair
- Arun Narayan
- Balaji Sarma as Subash, driver of Kuruvila Mathew
- Akshara Kishor as Parvathy
- Jayakrishnan as Bharathan, Police Officer

Additionally, actor Prithviraj Sukumaran provides his voice for narrating the events in the beginning and towards the end of the movie

== Production ==
=== Development and casting ===
The film was officially announced at the end of January 2015, which was said to be a revenge-thriller genre story revolving around two individuals with revengeful mind. Mohanlal, Padmakumar and Suresh Babu were collaborating for the second time after Shikkar (2010) which was also a revenge-thriller. In the beginning of February 2015, M. Padmakumar said to The Times of India, that he want to shoot the movie in a realistic way, "Kanal revolves around two people who are stuck in Dubai, affected by the recession, and are now back to God's Own Country. The two don't share a similar lifestyle and have had different experiences in Dubai. What happens after they meet in Kerala forms the plot of the story". The filming was then said to start in August 2015. In May 2015, Padmakumar further explained about the subject, "The story unfolds during a train journey. Two unknown people meet in the train and how this journey changes their lives forms the plot." According to Padmakumar, about Mohanlal's character, "There will be multiple variations in his get-up as the movie will capture three to four stages of his life". The film is marketed with the tagline "Every end has an old beginning".

A popular young actor was said to share screen space alongside Mohanlal in an equally important role. The production team asked suggestions for names from the audience through social platforms. Speculated names of Prithviraj Sukumaran and Dulquer Salmaan surfaced. Finally Anoop Menon was fixed. After writer Suresh Babu narrated the script to Anoop, he was immediately signing on the project, after his excitements about the film. Anoop who had earlier done few small roles in some Mohanlal films is doing an equally important full-length character opposite him. Anoop announced the news through his Facebook page on 3 May. Atul Kulkarni will also essay a key role. It was reported that he will play an intense role and will be an antagonist. Nikita Thukral is making her comeback into Mollywood with the film. It was the first time she was working with Mohanlal. Nikita said, she has combination scenes with Mohanlal and Kulkarni, which is a love triangle. She completed her shooting portions in Kerala with June 2015. Honey Rose shared screen space with Mohanlal for the first time, she played the role of his wife who is a teacher in a Doha-based international school. Few of her scenes were shot around Middle East. Innocent plays a bar owner who is in search of Nagamanikyam to escape his ill fortune.

=== Filming ===
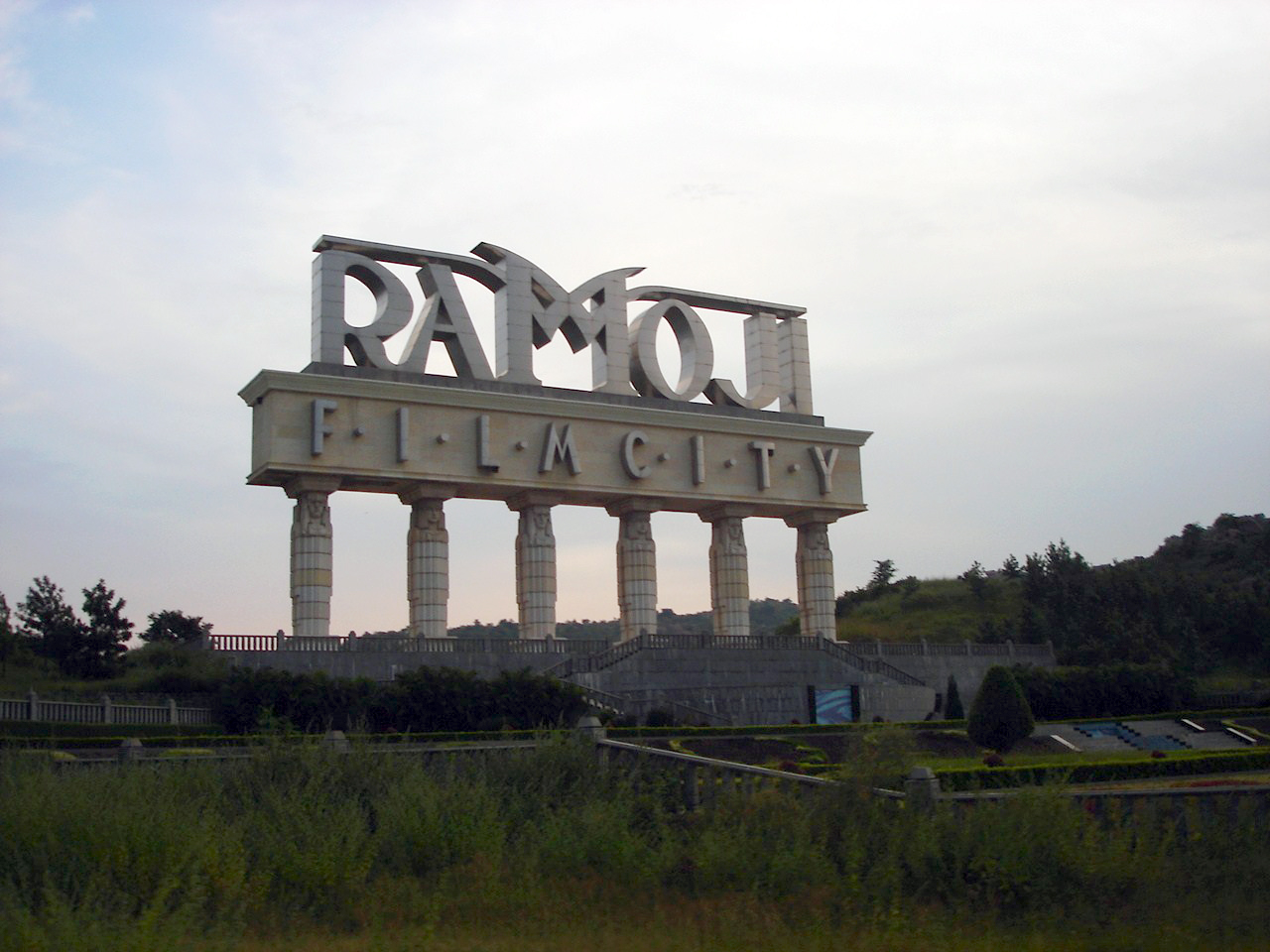
Ramoji Film City, was a significant location.

The film's launch and pooja function was held on 21 May 2015 on Mohanlal's birthday. But Mohanlal was not present at the event as he was in a short vacation in Japan after his tight film schedules. The principal photography commenced on 22 May 2015 in Kochi. The filming was supposed to start from the first week of June, but got preponed due to an undisclosed reason. Mohanlal joined the sets on 26 May.

In June 2015, a picture of Mohanlal kissing actor Innocent on his cheek inside a train compartment which was a recreation of a movie scene from 1990 Malayalam film No.20 Madras Mail was well received in social networking sites. The sequence was shot inside the Ramoji Film City, Hyderabad. The first schedule was completed in Hyderabad where Ramoji Film City was a major location. The second schedule which went on in Kochi mainly featured actors including Anoop Menon, Sheelu Abraham and Honey Rose.

The last schedule was at Qatar. After receiving permissions, the team started shooting in Doha as per the schedule on 17 July 2015. The shooting was held at locations in Doha Corniche, Banana Island and the Sealine Beach Resort at Mesaieed. An Indian school and a hospital was also part of the shoot. About the filming locations Padmakumar spoke to the newspaper Qatar Tribune, "The beauty of Doha has hardly been shown in Indian films. Therefore, we have selected a few beautiful locations for shooting the film". The filming continued there for two weeks. The filming was wrapped on 6 August 2015 in Doha.

=== Post-production ===
In September 2015, almost all post-production work was completed with only Mohanlal's dubbing part being left as he was working in another film. By the time, the production team released a first look motion poster on 8 September 2015 via YouTube. It was the first time that a Mohanlal film released a motion poster as part of the promotion work. The moster of 9 seconds shows Mohanlal in the backdrop of Middle East city Doha which was shown with the tagline – 'Every end has an old beginning'.

== Music ==
Kanal

Soundtrack album by Ouseppachan, Vinu Thomas
- Released: 17 September 2015
- Recorded: 2015
- Genre: Film soundtrack
- Length: 22:15
- Label: Muzik 247
- Producers: Ouseppachan, Vinu Thomas

Ouseppachan chronology
Utopiayile Rajavu (2015)	Kanal (2015)

The music was released by Muzik 247 on 17 September 2015 in an event organised at Hotel Travancore Court, Kochi at 7 pm. The soundtrack album was composed by Ouseppachan and Vinu Thomas ("Oru Venal Kaataai"), with lyrics written by Dr. Madhu Vasudevan and Prakash Maraar. It featured five songs, four of them were composed by Ouseppachan and one by Vinu Thomas. Directors Joshiy, Kamal and Thampi Kannamthanam were special guests at the function. At the presence of the film crew and other invited guests, Joshiy released the music.

The first video song "Oru Venal Kaataai" was released online by Muzik 247 on 7 October evening. The song features Anoop Menon, Sheelu Abraham and child artist Akshara Kishor. The song penned by Prakash Maraar and music composed by Vinu Thomas was sung by K. S. Chithra and Sudeep Kumar. The video of song "Pathukke Entho" featuring Mohanlal and Honey Rose was released on 16 October.

Kanal: Original Motion Picture Soundtrack
No.	Title	Lyrics	Singer(s)	Length
1.	"Pathukke Entho"	Dr. Madhu Vasudevan	Neha Nair	04:35
2.	"Maaya Nagarame"	Dr. Madhu Vasudevan	Sharreth	04:29
3.	"Magar Thum"	Dr. Madhu Vasudevan	Ustad Faiyaz Khan	05:22
4.	"Killathe Chollamo"	Dr. Madhu Vasudevan	Vaikom Vijayalakshmi	04:21
5.	"Oru Venal Kaataai"	Prakash Maraar	K. S. Chithra, Sudeep Kumar	04:08
Total length:				22:15

== Release ==
The film released in Vijayadashami day on 22 October 2015, in more than 100 theatres in Kerala. An official teaser of span 40 seconds was released on 6 October 2015,Filmibeat.com gave it a positive review calling it "highly promising" and praised the dialogue in the teaser. On 10 October, the official trailer was unveiled on YouTube and received positive responses in social medias. The television satellite right was sold pre-release to Surya TV. The film's DVD was released on 2 January 2016.

== Reception ==
=== Critical reception ===
The film received mixed reviews from the critics and audience alike. Akhila Menon of Filmibeat.com rated the film 2.5/5 and praised Mohanlal's performance and cinematography, but was critical about the film editing, songs, and screenplay. She said, "Director Padmakumar and scenarist S Suresh Babu have succeeded in depicting a decent crime thriller. But the screenplay fails to keep the audience engaged after a point and falls into a slow pace at certain point." Nelson K. Paul of Malayala Manorama rated the film 2.5/5 and concluded the review saying, "Kanal claims to be a revenge thriller but the writing falters. Loopholes are aplenty in the plot. Even if one ignores them, the movie has very less to keep the viewers engaged", he also criticized the songs. A critic from Behindwoods.com rated the film 2.5/5 and said, "Done differently this movie would have approached greatness, but is a bit of a letdown, especially in the second half." The critic praised the technical department but described the background music as "loud, jarring and is a throwback to the 1980s." Sachin Jose of International Business Times awarded 2.5/5 and praised Mohanlal's "remarkable" performance but criticized the screenplay. He said, "Though the film failed to create twists of a typical thriller movie, it was the facial expressions and gestures by Mohanlal that kept alive the suspenses throughout the film", also remarked "A tighter screenplay would have made the film more engaging and given the viewers a more thriller-like experience". Paresh C. Palicha of Rediff.com rated 2.5/5 and stated "This film is made in a technically slipshod manner. It is the actors – led by Mohanlal – who strive hard to hold it together and almost succeed making it a decent watch", also added "Mohanlal gives an effortless performance of a jovial man, who turns into a barbarian by the half time". Chandrakanth Viswanath of The New Indian Express wrote "It would have been a better outing if the movie was slimmer by chiseling out a few scenes". Sony V. Mathew of Mathrubhumi stated "By refraining from action scenes the director did his best to bring in that Hollywood style craft. On the scripting side the exaggerated dependence on ‘fate’ to narrate the story is questionable".

=== Box office ===
The opening day collection in Kerala box office was ₹81 lakh (US$84,000). The film is said to have collected approximately ₹2 crore (US$210,000) in three days from Kerala. It grossed ₹4.76 crore (US$490,000) from theaters in 14 days of release.

== Trivia ==
During the movie's conclusion, the character Anantharaman, played by Anoop Menon, quotes "If you're miserable, edgy and tired. You're in the perfect mood for journalism" by Warren Ellis mistakenly as if "Warren Ellis was a journalist. Unknown to the filmmakers, Warren Ellis is actually a Comic Book and Fiction writer and the quote is by Spider Jerusalem, the central character from his own comic book series Transmetropolitan.
