= Chaverpada =

2010 Indian film

- DVD cover
- Directed by: T. S. Jaspal
- Screenplay by: G. S. Anil
- Story by: T. S. Jaspal
- Produced by: Paulose K. Paul; Eldho Thomas; Sajan Jacob; K. N. Sivankuttan
- Starring: Bala; Arun; Manikuttan; Muktha; Krishna Prasad; Pawan
- Cinematography: Bharani K. Dharan
- Edited by: Samjith MHD
- Music by: Alex Paul (songs); S. P. Venkitesh (score)
- Production company: Sourparnika Visual Media
- Distributed by: Gayathri Media
- Release date: 10 December 2010
- Running time: 108 minutes
- Country: India
- Language: Malayalam

Chaverpada (transl. Suicide squad) is a 2010 Indian Malayalam-language action thriller film directed by T. S. Jaspal and written by G. S. Anil from a story by Jaspal. It stars Bala, Manikuttan, Arun, Muktha and Krishna Prasad. The songs were composed by Alex Paul, while S. P. Venkitesh provided background score.

In the film, a group of engineering students develop a software that can jam the city's wireless systems. When terrorists kidnap them for the technology, NSG Commando leader Vishal Sabhapathi is called to rescue them. Chaverpada was released in theatres on 10 December 2010.

== Plot ==
A group of engineering college students Ameer Sulthan, Abhimanyu, Vivek Narayan and Nandhan G. Nair who have developed a means of their own to voice their protests against the ills that have gripped today's society. The testing of a software that they have developed causes unexpected jams in the traffic signals as well as the wireless system of the city.

The youngsters realize that they are in trouble when the cops find out more about the incident. Police moved to the college to arrest them. However, they are kidnapped by a group of terrorists before the cops could lay their hands on them. Vishal Sabhapathi, the leader of the NSG Commando Wing, is soon called in to look into the case and rescue the students.

== Cast ==
- Bala as Vishal Sabhapathi, NSG officer
- Manikuttan as Ameer Sulthan
- Arun Cherukavil as Abhimanyu
- Vivek as Vivek Narayan
- Tony as Nandan G. Nair
- Muktha Elsa George as Gopika
- Krishna Prasad as Suryanarayanan Potti / Badusha Khan
- Pawan as Jaggu Bhai / Jehangir Mustafa / Varghese Antony / Yogeeshwaran / Parameshwaran
- Sadiq as NSG officer Shaan
- Anil Murali as NSG officer Vikram
- Anzil Rahman
- Kochu Preman
- Sudhi Koppa
- Johnson
- Ajay Nataraj

== Release ==
Chaverpada was released in theatres on 10 December 2010. In 2020, Krishna Prasad's character became the subject of internet trolls. Krishna Prasad said that he was unaffected by the trolls and that he prefers his villain character in Mizhikal Sakshi (2008) over Chaverpada.
