= Babu Namboothiri =

Indian actor

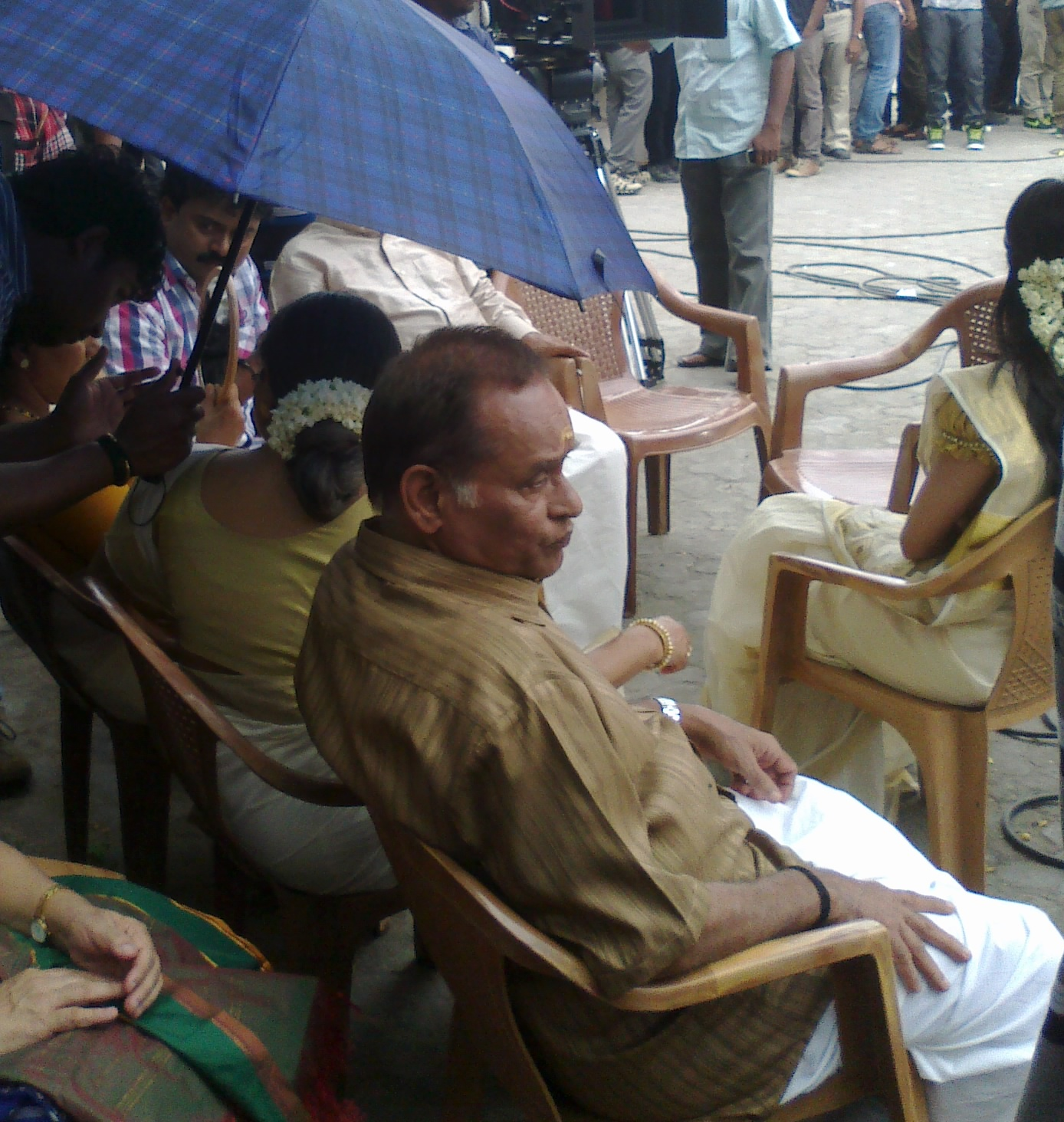
- Born: Babu Namboothiri; 12 August 1947 (age 78); Padinjare Mana, Mannakkanad, Kottayam, Travancore
- Occupations: Actor; chemistry professor
- Years active: 1982–present
- Spouse: Kumari Antharjanam
- Children: 3
- Parents: Neelakandan Namboothiri; Saraswathi

Babu Namboothiri (born 12 August 1947) is a retired Chemistry Professor and Head Of Department of Deva Mata College Kuravilangad and an Indian film and TV actor who has starred in more than 100 Malayalam films and various serials. He is famous for his villain and character roles, best known for his portrayal Thangal, in Thoovanathumbikal (1987), as the primary antagonist, Ajith, in Nirakkoottu (1985), the devious advocate in Jagratha, among many others, and in Cheriya Lokavum Valiya Manushyarum as Madhava Menon, an evil businessman and drug-dealer.

== Background ==
Babu Namboothiri was the eldest among the ten children of Neelakandan Namboothiri and Saraswathi Antharjanam at Mannakkanad, near Kuravilangad, Kottayam. He belongs to Padinjare Mana in Mannakkanad. He performs rituals at Chirayil Ganapathi Temple and has 7 brothers and 2 sisters. He graduated from Sree Sankara College and pursued Masters in Science from SRM College Rewa in Madhya Pradesh. His debut movie was Yaagam in 1982. He is a retired Chemistry Professor of Deva Matha College, Kuravilangad. He is married to Kumari Antharjanam and has three daughters.

== Filmography ==
=== 1980s ===
Year	Title	Role	Notes
1982	Yagam		
1982	Gaanam		
1983	Ashtapadi		
1983	Oomana Thinkal		
1983	Veena Poovu		
1984	Guruvayoor Maahathmyam		
1985	Nirakkoottu	Ajith	
1985	Samantharam	Jose	
1986	Adiverukal	Josephkutty	
1986	Nyayavidhi	Maharshi Mathews	
1987	Swathi Thirunal	Diwanji Subbaravu	
1987	Theertham	Surendran	
1987	Chanthayil Choodi Vilkkunna Pennu		
1987	Thoovanathumbikal	Thangal	
1987	Jaalakam	Gopinathan	
1987	Ezhuthapurangal	Binoy Chandy	
1987	Amrutham Gamaya	Ilethu	
1987	Thaniyavarthanam	Sreedharan	
1988	Puravrutham	Masur	
1988	Kanakambarangal	Thirumeni	
1988	Moonnam Mura	Mohan	
1988	Dhinarathrangal	Thomachan	
1988	Mukthi	Pillai	
1989	Naduvazhikal	Abraham Varkey	
1989	Adikkurippu	Public Prosecutor	
1989	Jagratha	Adv. Janardanan Nair	

=== 1990s ===
Year	Title	Role	Notes
1990	Nanma Niranjavan Sreenivasan		
1990	Cheriya Lokavum Valiya Manushyarum	Madhava Menon	
1990	Vembanad		
1990	Vachanam		
1990	Varthamana Kalam	Shekhara Pillai	
1990	Mathilukal	Political Prisoner	
1990	Kuttettan	Vishnu's friend	
1990	Ee Thanutha Veluppan Kalathu	Justice T. Vasudev	
1991	Aavanikunnile Kinnaripookkal	Church Priest	
1991	Georgootty C/O Georgootty	Ouseppachan	
1991	Dhanam	Balan	
1991	Arangu	Narayanankutty Nair	
1991	Perumthachan	Kesavan	
1991	Koodikazhcha	Mathachan	
1991	Aparaahnam	School Principal	
1992	Congratulations Miss Anitha Menon		
1992	Utsavamelam	Velichappadu	
1992	Oottyppattanam	Surya Nampoothiri	
1992	Cheppadividya	Geevarghese Achan	
1992	Ayalathe Adheham	David Gomez	
1993	Kavadiyattam	Raman Nair	
1993	Customs Diary	Padmanabha Iyer	
1993	Ammayane Sathyam	Parvathi's father	
1993	Dhruvam	Ponmani	
1994	CID Unnikrishnan B.A., B.Ed.	Vasudevan	
1994	Vidheyan	Yusuf Picha	
1995	Aadyathe Kanmani	Raghavan Nair	
1995	Sargavasantham		
1996	Kathapurushan	Veluchar	
1997	Adivaram		
1997	Janathipathyam	Bhattathirippadu	
1998	Pootthiruvaathira Raavil		
1998	Elavamkodu Desam	Raru Aasan	
1998	The Truth	Mahendran	
1999	Stalin Sivadas	Madhavan Nair	
1999	Pathram	Warrier	

=== 2000s ===
Year	Title	Role	Notes
2000	Snehadoothu		
2000	Shayanam		
2000	Dada Sahib	Shekharan	
2001	Ee Nadu Innale Vare	Thrikkothu Vaidyar	
2001	Praja	Rama Varma Thirumalpadu / Ramettan / Ram Ram	
2001	Ee Parakkum Thalika	Krishna Pillai/Krishnettan	
2002	Kanalkkireedam		
2002	Neelakaasham Niraye		
2002	Pakalppooram		
2002	Valkannadi	Kunjuraman	
2002	Shivam	Sarvodayam Kumar	
2002	Kanmashi	Paramu	
2003	Swantham Maalavika		
2004	Perumazhakkalam	Mani Swamy	
2005	Bus Conductor		
2005	Mayookham		
2005	Pauran	Chacko	
2006	Vadakkumnadhan	Govinda Pisharadi	
2006	Prajapathi		
2006	Yes Your Honour		
2007	Naalu Pennungal		
2007	Aanandabhairavi		
2007	Detective	Prabhakaran Thampi	
2007	Vinodayathra	Ramanunni	
2007	Nasrani	Varghese	
2008	Innathe Chintha Vishayam	Premila's father	
2008	Bullet		
2008	College Kumaran	Kumaran's father	
2008	Twenty:20	Justice Kaimal	
2009	Swapnamaalika		
2009	Kerala Cafe		Segment: "Nostalgia"
2009	Evidam Swargamanu		

=== 2010s ===
Year	Title	Role	Notes
2010	Shikkar	Fr. Paul	
2010	Aagathan	Dr. Unnithan	
2010	Aathmakatha		
2011	Nadakame Ulakam	Socialist Kumaran	
2011	Indian Rupee		
2011	Maharaja Talkies	Raghavan Nair	
2011	Malayalanadu		
2012	Thiruvambadi Thamban	Achuvettan	
2012	MLA Mani: Patham Classum Gusthiyum	Asainar Mash	
2012	The Filmstaar	Swamy	
2013	Dolls	Pisharadi	
2013	Trivandrum Lodge	Pimp Thangal	Cameo
2013	Kutteem Kolum	Kaimal	
2013	Hotel California	Koshi	
2013	Kaliyachan		
2013	Sringaravelan	Ayyappanasaan	
2014	Avatharam	Sri Ramakrishna Moorthy	
2014	RajadhiRaja	Gangadhara Menon	
2014	Mylanchi Monchulla Veedu	Krishnan Vaidyer	
2017	Sopanam	Shankara Poduval	Short film
2018	Premanjali		
2019	Madhaveeyam		

=== 2020s ===
Year	Title	Role	Notes
2021	Taaya		
2023	Ottamaram	Ravi	
2024	Mayamma		
2024	Oru Anweshanathinte Thudakkam	Thomas	
2024	Pani	Suresh's brother	

== Television ==
Year	Programme	Role	TV Channel
2015	Charithram Enniloode	Guest	Safari TV
2015	Eashwaran Sakshiyayi		Flowers TV
2000	Samayam		Asianet
2006	Suryaputhri		Asianet
1997	Pankiyamma	Ramakuruppu	Doordarshan
