= Munthirivallikal Thalirkkumbol (soundtrack) =

Soundtrack album by Bijibal and M. Jayachandran
- Released: 4 December 2016
- Recorded: October 2016
- Studio: Muzik Lounge School of Audio Technology, Chennai
- Genre: Feature film soundtrack
- Length: 16:32
- Language: Malayalam
- Label: Enkore Entertainment
- Producer: Bijibal; M. Jayachandran

Bijibal chronology
| Kuttikalundu Sookshikkuka (2016) | Munthirivallikal Thalirkkumbol (2016) | Aby (2017) |

M. Jayachandran chronology
| Marupadi (2016) | Munthirivallikal Thalirkkumbol (2016) | Kambhoji (2017) |

Munthirivallikal Thalirkkumbol is the soundtrack to the 2017 film of the same name directed by Jibu Jacob and produced by Weekend Blockbusters, starring Mohanlal and Meena in the lead roles. The film's musical score is composed by Bijibal, who contributed two songs to the four-song soundtrack, while the remaining two songs were composed by M. Jayachandran. The lyrics were written by Rafeeq Ahamed, Madhu Vasudevan, and D. B. Ajithkumar. The film's soundtrack was released on 4 December 2016.

== Release ==
Initially M. Jayachadran was announced as the sole composer, but in October 2016, Bijibal was assigned to score the background music and compose two songs for the film. The film's music launch was held at a function at the Taj Hotel in Kochi on 4 December 2016 in the presence of the film crew and other guests. The soundtrack was released for digital download by Enkore Entertainment on 21 December.

== Music video ==
The film's first music video, "Punnamada Kayal" debuted on YouTube on 16 December 2016. The song features Ulahannan and his family cheering for a vallam kali and their other family moments. The makers also released a "how-it-was-made" video of the song "Athimara Kombile" on the video-sharing site on 22 December 2016; it was sung by Shreya Ghoshal and Vijay Yesudas. Its music video was released on 25 January 2017, the song featured locales in Shimla. The video song for "Maarivillu" was released on 16 January 2017 which depicts on the couple's gloomy life, while the video for "Oru Puzhayarikil" was released after the film's premiere, on 5 February 2017.

== Track listing ==
| No. | Title | Lyrics | Music | Performer(s) | Length |
|---|---|---|---|---|---|
| 1. | "Athimara Kombile" | Rafeeq Ahamed | M. Jayachandran | Shreya Ghoshal, Vijay Yesudas | 4:45 |
| 2. | "Oru Puzhayarikil" | Rafeeq Ahammed | Bijibal | Shweta Mohan | 3:59 |
| 3. | "Punnamada Kayal" | Madhu Vasudevan | M. Jayachandran | Jithin Raj | 4:42 |
| 4. | "Maarivillu" | D. B. Ajithkumar | Bijibal | Bijibal | 3:06 |
| Total length: | | | | | 16:32 |

== Reception ==
Vipin Nair of Music Aloud assigned 3.5 out of 5 and wrote "Bijibal and M Jayachandran have a lot more to offer, as adequately proven by Munthirivallikal Thalirkkumbol's soundtrack." Deepa Soman of The Times of India called it as "a mixed bag, both in terms of genre and hook value". Anna M. M. Vetticad of Firstpost described "Punnamada Kayal" being "absolutely unnecessary and completely ordinary" but complimented Shweta Mohan's vocals for "Oru Puzhayarikil". Anu James of International Business Times complimented the music as "impressive". Sethumadhavan N. of Moviecrow wrote "The songs by Bijibal and M.Jayachandran are pretty decent, fitting in well with the narrative."

== Accolades ==
At the 20th Asianet Film Awards, the film won two awards: Best Lyricist for Ahmed (also for Thondimuthalum Driksakshiyum) and Best Female Playback Singer for Shweta Mohan for the song "Oru Puzhayariki". Mohan also received a nomination at the 65th Filmfare Awards South and won the Vanitha Film Award at the same category.
