= Krishna Prasad (actor) =

Indian actor

- Born: Krishna Prasad N. P. Changanassery, Kerala, India
- Education: Mahatma Gandhi University
- Occupations: Actor; agriculturist
- Years active: 1984; 1988–present
- Spouse: Reshmi
- Children: 2

Krishna Prasad N. P. is an Indian actor and agriculturist, who appears in Malayalam films and television. He made his acting debut as a teen in 1984 with a bit part in K. G. George's Panchavadi Palam. His debut credited role came in Padmarajan's 1988 drama Moonnam Pakkam. Since then, he has acted in over 150 films.

He played a leading role in Venal Kinavukal (1991) directed by K. S. Sethumadhavan and written by M. T. Vasudevan Nair, as well as in the TV serial Vritthandham on Doordarshan. Although he has predominantly been cast in supporting roles, Prasad has collaborated with a wide range of filmmakers, including Adoor Gopalakrishnan, A. K. Lohithadas, Sibi Malayil, Priyadarshan, Anjali Menon, Dr. Biju, Lal Jose, Martin Prakkat, Abrid Shine, and Midhun Manuel Thomas.

Prasad ventured into paddy cultivation in 2007. In 2010, he won Karshakamitra award from the Government of Kerala for farming. Prasad has served as a member of the Central Board of Film Certification (CBFC), Kerala State Chalachitra Academy, and Kerala Lalithakala Akademi.

== Early life ==
Krishna Prasad was born into a traditional agriculturist family and has two siblings. His ancestral home is located at Anchuvilakku, Perunna, Changanassery. His father, N. P. Unnipilla was a teacher, social worker, and agriculturist. Prasad began acting at the age of eight, when he portrayed a 70-year-old man in the stage drama Prism. He remained actively involved in theatre thereafter, which eventually paved the way for his entry into cinema. He was a two-time recipient of the Best Actor award at the Mahatma Gandhi University youth festival, and is a graduate of Mahatma Gandhi University.

== Acting career ==
Prasad has acted in over 150 films. He made his acting debut as a teen in 1984 with K. G. George's Panchavadi Palam, playing a bit part as a charlatan's disciple. His father also appeared in the film. It was followed by his debut credited role in Padmarajan's 1988 drama Moonnam Pakkam. He worked with Padmarajan again in a prominent role in Season (1989). He was then cast in a leading role in K. S. Sethumadhavan-directed drama Venal Kinavukal written by M. T. Vasudevan Nair. Around the same time, he played the leading role in the television serial Vritthandham on Doordarshan.

In 1997, he acted alongside Sivaji Ganesan in Oru Yathramozhi. He has also acted in Malayalam television serials. He won Critics award for his acting in the serial Samaksham. He also acted in serials such as Nalukettu, Sthree, Samayam among others. He played an antagonistic role in the 2008 drama Mizhikal Sakshi.

Prasad was appointed as a member of the Central Board of Film Certification (CBFC), Kerala State Chalachitra Academy, and Kerala Lalithakala Akademi.

== Farming ==
Prasad ventured into paddy cultivation in 2007. He also cultivates plantain and tapioca. He holds a Kisan Credit Card. Prasad has also been involved as a social activist in agricultural field, in issues related to Kuttanad Package and paddy field fund. In 2008, he conducted an event called Bhakshyasurakshakkayi Karshakakkoottaima (farmers community for food security) for honouring farmers which was attended by thousands of farmers, who were honoured by wearing ponnada. A class seven question paper of SSA involved a question about Krishna Prasad as a farmer.

In 2010, he won Karshakamitra award from the Government of Kerala. In 2023, Prasad joined fellow farmers in protesting the non-payment for their produce sold to Supplyco, which offered them unsolicited loans in place of cash payments.

== Personal life ==
Krishna Prasad is married to Reshmi. They have two children—Prarthana Krishna and Prapancha Krishna. He resides in Perunna, Changanassery. In 2020, he started a YouTube channel called Karshakasree Krishna Prasad.

== Filmography ==
=== Films ===
Year	Title	Role	Notes
1984	Panchavadi Palam	Swami's disciple	Bit part
1986	Ambadi Thannilorunni	Deepu's Friend	
1988	Moonnam Pakkam	Sreedharan	Debut credited role
1989	Season	Housekeeper	
1991	Venal Kinavukal	Subramanya Iyyer/Subbudu	Leading role
1992	Kamaladalam		
1992	Ayalathe Adheham	Sudheeran/Sudhi	
1993	Johnny	Antony	
1994	Pavithram	Student	
1994	Pakshe		
1994	Sukrutham		
1995	Kusruthikaatu	Rajeev	
1995	Thacholi Varghese Chekavar	Prasad	
1995	Arabia	Villager	
1996	Swapna Lokathe Balabhaskaran	Manoj	
1996	Kanjirappally Kariachan	James	
1997	Oru Yathramozhi	Unni/Namboothiri Kutti	
1997	Adukkala Rahasyam Angaadi Paattu		
1997	Manikyakoodaram		
1998	Meenathil Thalikettu	Sudhi	
1998	Kanmadam	Ravi	
1998	Nakshatratharattu	Prakash	
1998	Amma Ammaayiyamma	Balachandran	
2000	Summer Palace		
2001	Nakshathragal Parayathirunnathu		
2003	Mr. Brahmachari		
2003	Meerayude Dukhavum Muthuvinte Swapnavum		
2004	Wanted		
2004	Vettam	Hotel manager	
2005	Iruvattam Manavaatti		
2005	Naran		
2006	Mahasamudram	Thampi	
2007	Nanma	Ramankutty	
2008	Mizhikal Sakshi	Feroz	
2009	Oru Pennum Randaanum	Pankiyamma's baby's father	
2010	Shikkar		
2010	Chaverpada	Suryanarayanan Potti/Badhusha Khan	
2011	The Filmstaar	Kishore	
2012	Orange		
2012	Parudeesa	Johny	
2013	Black Forest		
2013	ABCD: American-Born Confused Desi	Showroom Manager	
2013	God for Sale		
2013	Pullipulikalum Aattinkuttiyum		
2013	Daivathinte Swantham Cleetus		
2013	Geethaanjali		
2014	Raktharakshassu 3D		
2014	Bangalore Days	Kuttan's uncle	
2014	Perariyathavar	Bus conductor	
2014	Aamayum Muyalum	Kaikambakaran	
2015	Fireman	Fireman Prasad	
2015	Monsoon		
2015	Valiya Chirakulla Pakshikal	Reporter Venukumar	
2016	Hello Namasthe	Musthafa	
2016	Vettah		
2016	Pinneyum	Photographer	
2016	Oppam	Raghavan	
2016	Kochavva Paulo Ayyappa Coelho	Bank manager	
2016	Buddhanum Chaplinum Chirikkunnu		
2017	Sakhavu	Advocate	
2017	1971: Beyond Borders	Sahadevan's friend	
2018	Oru Kuttanadan Blog	Mankombu	
2018	Mandharam	Rajesh's friend	
2018	Madhuramee Yathra		
2019	Irupathiyonnaam Noottaandu	Mathew Koshy	
2019	Oru Nakshathramulla Aakasham		
2019	Ittymaani: Made in China	Doctor	
2021	Nayattu		
2021	Marakkar: Lion of the Arabian Sea	Translator	
2022	Meppadiyan		
2022	Mahaveeryar	Krishnanunni	
2022	Pathonpatham Noottandu	Narayana Namboothiri	
2022	Shefeekkinte Santhosham	Shamsu	
2023	Maheshum Marutiyum	Dasappan	
2023	1921: Puzha Muthal Puzha Vare		
2024	Abraham Ozler	MRI technician	
2024	Ezhuthola	Krishnan Ashaan	
2024	Bad Boyz	Badusha Khan	
2024	Kadha Innuvare		
2025	Get-Set Baby		

=== Television ===
Year	Title	Role	Network	
	Vritthandham		Doordarshan	Leading role
1998	Sthree		Asianet	
	Samayam	Pottan Narayanan	Asianet	
	Samaksham			
2008 – 2010	Shri Mahabhagavatham	Nakulan	Asianet	
2018	Makkal (TV series)	Gopan	Mazhavil Manorama	
2021	Room No. 54		ZEE5	Web series
2023-2024	Balanum Ramayum		Mazhavil Manorama	

== Awards and nominations ==
He has won Critics award for his acting in the television serial Samaksham. In 2010, he won Karshakamitra award from the Government of Kerala, recognising his efforts in farming.
