= Arangu (film) =

- Directed by: Chandrasekharan
- Screenplay by: A. Sheriff Alappy Sheriff
- Produced by: Augustin Elanjipilli
- Starring: Thilakan; Geetha; Ashokan; Sukumaran; Babu Namboothiri; Prem Kumar
- Cinematography: Sekhar V. Joseph
- Edited by: L. Bhoominathan
- Music by: Johnson
- Production company: Noble Pictures
- Distributed by: Noble Pictures
- Release date: 1991
- Country: India
- Language: Malayalam

Arangu is a 1991 Indian Malayalam film, directed by Chandrasekharan. The film stars Thilakan, Geetha, Ashokan, Sukumaran and Babu Namboothiri in the lead roles. The film has musical score by Johnson.

== Cast ==
- Thilakan as Adv. K. P. Menon
- Geetha as A.S.P (Aparna. S. Menon) IPS
- Sukumaran as Public Prosecutor Adv. Robert Perera Vallokkaran
- Sai Kumar as Xavier Robert Pereira "Xavy"
- Ragasudha as Neelima
- Jagathi Sreekumar as Sivaraman Pilla
- Babu Namboothiri as Narayanankutty Nair
- Kaviyoor Ponnamma as Madhavi
- Shari as Alice
- Mahesh as Vineeth Menon
- T.P. Madhavan as Judge
- Prem Kumar as Pappan Govindan
- Adoor Bhavani as Aparna's Grandmother
- Manu Varma as Rajeevan
- Baby Surendran
- K.P.A.C Sabu as Dr. Francis Mathew
- Ashokan as Unni Viswanath

== Soundtrack ==
The music was composed by Johnson.

No.	Song	Singers	Lyrics	Length (m:ss)
1	"Muthukkili Mozhikale"	K. S. Chithra, M. G. Sreekumar	Kaithapram	
2	"Pookkadambilithirikkudanna Neetti Odi Vannu"	Krishnachandran	Kaithapram	
