= Thandavam =

- Directed by: Shaji Kailas
- Written by: S. Suresh Babu
- Produced by: Johny Sagariga
- Starring: Mohanlal; Kiran Rathod; Sai Kumar; Nedumudi Venu; Manoj K. Jayan; Jagadish; Vijayakumar; Jagathy Sreekumar
- Cinematography: Sanjeev Shankar
- Edited by: L. Bhoominathan
- Music by: M. G. Sreekumar; Perumbavoor G. Raveendranath; C. Rajamani (score)
- Production company: Dickle Cinema
- Distributed by: Johnny Sagariga
- Release date: 25 July 2002
- Running time: 160 minutes
- Country: India
- Language: Malayalam

Thandavam is a 2002 Indian Malayalam-language action drama directed by Shaji Kailas, written by S. Suresh Babu, and produced by Johny Sagariga. It stars Mohanlal, Kiran Rathod, Nedumudi Venu, Vijaykumar, Sai Kumar, Jagathy Sreekumar, Manoj K. Jayan, and Jagadish. Released in 86 centers, Thandavam was released with high expectations and had the highest opening-day collection at the box office in the history of Malayalam cinema at the time, although it failed to maintain it further and ended up as an average grosser.The film was dubbed into Tamil and released as Erumugam.

== Plot ==
The story centers on Kasinathan, a pragmatic but playful businessman keen on the general welfare of his men. He also runs a resort and massage parlour as a side business. Kasinathan is the younger brother of Swaminathan, the heir to Valiyamangalam Malika and the head of erstwhile feudal Midhilapuri. Midhilapuri is an idyllic village that prospered through the judicious use of agriculture as the path to good life. Kasinathan is powerful in his own right and is tipped to succeed influential politician Menon in Kerala politics. He has a secret admirer in the form of a mysterious girl who drops messages and love hints every day. But Kasinathan has better issues to worry about!

The burning concern of providing drinking water supply to the Udayankara colony is time and again sabotaged by Cherpunkal Shankar Das, a wily and unscrupulous politician of crassest morals who is intent on teaching a lesson to the alleged loyalty of the people who continue to support righteous politicians. The reciprocal justice is carried out by Kasinathan who in a strategic move corners Shankar Das in a compromising position with a serial actress and blackmails him to release permission for water supply in the village. Shankar Das is forced to resign from the cabinet. Ensuing celebration is amply enjoyed in a rain dance song by Kasinathan with all and sundry of his devoted satellites, including characters Murugan, Vellapulli Mathachan, Tomi, Basheer, Pushpakumaran, etc. Kasinathan's secret lover turns out to be Meenakshi, the only sister of his good friend Commissioner Rajeevan.

The upcoming businessman Dasappan Gounder and his henchmen smell an opportunity to market Cola drinks in Midhilapuri and approach Swaminathan to start a mutually profitable business deal. Swaminathan in his idealist moral sense is staunchly against the endeavour. Disappointed Gounder joins forces with Shankar Das and craftily plots the death of Swaminathan in a planned operation. The disappearance of Swaminathan moderates Kasinathan to an extent. He decides to don the garb of Midhilapauri's saviour and returns to his Valiyamangalam Malika.

In a chance encounter, Kasinathan learns of his elder brother's death as a planned murder by Gounder, DYSP, and Shankar Das. This unleashes the beast within him and true to his name, Kasinathan trounces the hapless Gounder and Shankar Das to a vegetative life-death end. Dasappan Gounder is lured to a barn and is thrashed to senselessness by Kasinathan. Meanwhile, Shankar Das is on a self-imposed pilgrimage to gather strength for a showdown with Kasinathan. He is eventually caught in the middle of the Kayakalpa treatment at an ashram and goes mad in the end, just retribution for a life full of sins and debauched deeds. After sorting out the evil issues, Kasinathan is still troubled by the "gap" and decides to solve this issue once and for all by marrying his sweetheart.

== Cast ==
- Mohanlal as Kashinathan
- Nedumudi Venu as Swaminathan, Kasinathan's elder brother
- Kiran Rathod as Meenakshi
- Sai Kumar as Cherpunkal Shankar Das, The main antagonist
- Manoj K. Jayan as Dasappan Gounder, secondary antagonist
- Jagadish as Murugan
- Jagathy Sreekumar as Vellapulli Mathachan
- Vijayakumar as Tomy
- Bhavani as Swaminathan's wife
- Salim Kumar as Basheer
- T. P. Madhavan as Warrier
- Maniyanpilla Raju as Pushpakumaran
- Captain Raju as Commissioner Rajeevan IPS, Meenakshi's elder brother
- Spadikam George as DYSP Alex Kuruvilla
- Sadiq as MLA Jayasingam
- C. I. Paul as Raghavan Pillai
- Suma Jayaram as Meenakshi's sister-in-law
- Arun Kumar as Anil, Swaminathan's son
- Krishna as Veda, Swaminathan's daughter
- Rajendran as Shankar Das's henchman
- Ponnambalam as goon
- Ajith Kollam as Shankar Das's henchman
- Mumtaj as Kavya Menon with song appearance "Palum kudameduthu"
- Abhinayashree as Item girl in the song "Kombedu kuzhaledu"

== Music ==
Thandavam

Soundtrack album by M. G. Sreekumar
- Released: 10 July 2002
- Recorded: 2002
- Genre: Feature film soundtrack
- Label: J. S. Audio
- Producer: M. G. Sreekumar

M. G. Sreekumar chronology
Thandavam (2002)	Chathurangam (2002)

Perumbavoor G. Raveendranath chronology
Sayahnam (2000)	Thandavam (2002)	Vasantha Malika (2003)

The film has five songs composed by M. G. Sreekumar and one by Perumbavoor G. Raveendranath ("Himagiri Nirakal"), with lyrics by Kaithapram Damodaran. The soundtrack album was released by J. S. Audio. The background score was composed by C. Rajamani.

Thandavam (Original Motion Picture Soundtrack)
No.	Title	Singer(s)	Length
1.	"Aaramam Pookkunnu"	K. J. Yesudas
2.	"Chandramani Kammalaninju" (Raga: Mohanam)	M. G. Sreekumar, Sujatha Mohan
3.	"Himagiri Nirakal" (Raga: Saramati)	M. G. Sreekumar
4.	"Kombedu Kuzhaledu"	M. G. Sreekumar
5.	"Paalkkinnam"	M. G. Sreekumar, Sujatha Mohan
6.	"Paalum Kudameduthu"	M. G. Sreekumar, Saraswathy Sankar
7.	"Pottuthotta Kiliye"	M. G. Sreekumar, Sujatha Mohan

== Box office ==
Released in 86 centers, Thandavam had the highest opening-day collection at the box office in the history of Malayalam cinema, although it failed to maintain it further and ended up as a box office disaster as reviews were negative due to supernatural power.Audience expected a film like narasimham series, but overhype lead to disaster
