= Dada Sahib =

- Poster
- Directed by: Vinayan
- Written by: S Suresh Babu; Vinayan
- Produced by: Sargam Kabeer
- Starring: Mammootty
- Cinematography: Sanjeev Shankar
- Edited by: G. Murali
- Music by: Mohan Sithara
- Distributed by: Sargam Pictures
- Release date: 24 December 2000
- Running time: 150 minutes
- Country: India
- Language: Malayalam

Dada Sahib is a 2000 Malayalam-language political drama film co-written and directed by Vinayan, starring Mammootty in dual roles as a father and son. He played the roles of Dada Sahib, of the Indian independence movement and his son Abubacker, an army man. The film was one of the highest-grossing films of the year. Sai Kumar, Murali, Rajan P Dev, Babu Namboothiri, Kalabhavan Mani, Cochin Haneefa, K. B. Ganesh Kumar, Madhupal and Mohan Sharma play other pivotal roles. Dada Sahib movie also used Digital DTS Surround

== Plot ==
Thatankulli Dada Mohammed Sahib, popularly known as Dada Sahib, is a freedom fighter and a former officer with the Indian National Army who always strives for the welfare of people, and the country is more than anything to him. His only son (Retd.) Subedar Abubacker 'Abu' is in jail, awaiting his death sentence. He is accused of disloyalty towards his country in the name of Pakistan and for killing hundreds of people including Sahib's daughter in the Thaliyoor temple. Heartbroken, Sahib goes to meet the Governor Rahmath Ali, who is Sahib's close friend's son in order to get a final chance to rescue his son. But Rahmath Ali informs Sahib that he couldn't do anything as Abubacker's death sentence is declared, and even the President of India had rejected his mercy petition. Sahib then goes to jail to meet Abu and gives him a strong motivation that he should die only with the spirit of a true Indian. Afterwards Sahib confronts IG Skariah Zacharia, a cunning police officer who tells Sahib that he and his son are fighting for Pakistan and they are showing disloyalty to India. On reaching home, Sahib reveals his past to his right-hand man Raghavan.

At Lahore, during the turbulent and hysterical days of Partition, he put up a brave fight against communally motivated Muslims who targeted thousands of Hindus - as part of the communal pogrom that engulfed British India. After a long fight, Sahib threatens the leader of the Muslim gang. Hindus thank him for saving their lives and he is praised and celebrated as a hero.

Back to the present, Doctor Raveendran, a close friend of Dadasahib discloses his pain to Das, a sincere and heartful police officer, of losing his wife in the bomb blast of Thaliyoor temple. Then comes Athira, who loves Abu, to see him for the last time. She, too is heartbroken to know that Abu is awaiting his death sentence. As the time for his hanging was nearby, all the ones who knew his innocence were in tears, including Athira. However, the story takes a turn as Abu escapes from the death miraculously despite being hanged. On reaching the hospital, Sahib is seen relieved and happy of getting his son back. Ravi, who lost his mother in the temple explosion takes some photos of Sahib and Abu in the hospital discreetly to publish it in the media and accusing him for another death sentence. He learns the truth from Dr. Raveendran when Abu recalls a past where the State Home Minister Mohammed Kutty was one of the reasons behind the explosion that happened at the temple. He teamed up with IG Skariah and Swami Atmaswaroopan, an evil godman, to perform the explosions in Kerala as per the instruction of their leader 'Supper', who was the main hand behind these explosions. After killing hundreds in the temple, Skariah and Atmaswaroopan falsely accused Abu for the same.

In the present day, Sahib and Abu set out to find the mysterious Pakistan agent 'Supper'. However, Skariah and Mohammed Kutty now doubt that Abu is still alive. Afterwards Athira, who is extremely happy, goes from her town to meet Abu. She goes with Raveendran. But on the way, Raveendran is killed, and Athira is taken to Mohammed Kutty's and Atmaswaroopan's custody to know if Abu is alive or not but in vain. Later they take Sahib and bind him to find the truth. Abu, Raghavan and Ravi rushes to the place and fights Mohammed Kutty and the gang. Between the fight, Abu came to see Athira being raped and killed. In a fit of anger, he kills Atmaswaroopan and Skariah, who reveals that Mohammed Kutty only knew 'Supper'.

The next day all are celebrating 50th Republic Day of India in a large stadium where again an explosion is planned by Supper and Mohammed Kutty. Abu comes with Mohammed Kutty at the scene after making the latter defuse the bombs. All the people present there including the Governor, the Chief Minister of Kerala, are shocked to see Abu alive. Forcing Mohammed Kutty to tell the truth, he confesses their crimes to the public and also reveals that 'Supper' is nobody else than Governor Rahmath Ali. After revealing the truth, Rahmath Ali's bodyguard kills Mohammed Kutty. After a long attempt to kill Abu, Sahib comes with a sword to eliminate Rahmath Ali. The Chief Minister warns Sahib not to kill a Governor, and if the accusation comes true, the law will take actions. Sahib replies that he has already lost his faith in Politicians and Judiciary then moves ahead to kill Rahmath Ali after advising them about the importance of unity and strength in fighting for India. The Governer's bodyguards shoot Sahib ruthlessly and Abu is shocked on seeing that. However, the dying Sahib musters up strength, manages to behead Rahmath Ali and succumbs to his injuries at the scene. The Public realises Abu's innocence and praises him.

== Cast ==
- Mammootty in a dual role as:
  - Thatankulli Dada Mohammed Sahib (Father)
  - Subedar T.M. Abubacker (Son)
    - Arun Kumar as Young Abubacker
- Sai Kumar as Mohammad Kutty
- Murali as Dr. Raveendran
- Rajan P. Dev as IG Skaria Zachariah IPS
- Cochin Haneefa as Raghavan
- Kalabhavan Mani as Thankachan
- Mohan Sharma as Governor Rahmath Ali/ 'Supper'
- K. B. Ganesh Kumar as Das
- Madhupal as Ravi
- Babu Namboothiri as Shekharan
- Sadiq as Balram, Jail Warden
- Augustine as Nooruddin Kunju
- Shivaji as Dr. John
- Shivanandan as Swami Atmaswaroopan
- Athira as Athira
- Rehana Navas as Malathi
- Kaveri as Ayisha, Sahib's daughter
  - Sanusha as Young Ayisha
- Manka Mahesh as Ammukutty
- Meena Ganesh as Athira's mother
- Ravi Vallathol as Chandradas, Magistrate
- Kundara Johny as Ashokan, Local Inspector
- Joju George as Governor's bodyguard

== Soundtrack ==
The film's soundtrack contains six songs, all composed by Mohan Sithara, with lyrics by Yusufali Kecheri.

#	Title	Singer(s)
1	"Alliyaambal Poove" (F)	K. S. Chitra
2	"Alliyaambal Poove" (M)	K. J. Yesudas
3	"Daadaa Saahib Varunne"	K. J. Yesudas, Mohan Sithara, Mobina
4	"Thaliyoor Bhagavathikku"	K. S. Chitra, M. G. Sreekumar, Vijay Yesudas
5	"Yaamam Punassamaagama Yaamam" (F)	K. S. Chitra
6	"Yaamam Punassamaagama Yaamam" (M)	K. J. Yesudas
