= Nadan =

nadan
- Directed by: Kamal
- Written by: S. Suresh Babu
- Produced by: Anilkumar Ambalakkara
- Starring: Jayaram; Remya Nambeesan; Sajitha Madathil
- Cinematography: Madhu Neelakandan
- Edited by: K. Rajagopal
- Music by: Ouseppachan
- Production company: Ambalakkara Global Films
- Release date: November 22, 2013
- Country: India
- Language: Malayalam

Nadan (English: The actor) is a 2013 Malayalam drama film directed by Kamal and written by S. Suresh Babu. Jayaram and Remya Nambeeshan play the lead roles, while the rest of the cast are former theatre artists that include K. P. A. C. Lalitha, Joy Mathew, P. Balachandran, Hareesh Peradi and Sasi Kalinga. It was produced by Anilkumar Ambalakkara under the banner of Ambalakkara Global Films. Nadan features some famous scenes from the famous Kerala People's Arts Club (K P A C) dramas Ningalenne Communistakki and Mudiyanaya Puthran.

== Plot ==
Nadan is the story of a popular drama troupe owned by Devadas Sargavedi, which was previously possessed by his father and grandfather in the past, and speaks about the problems faced by the owner and his survival. The revival of this mighty art through the sustained effort of the talented theatre artists forms the crux of the narrative.

== Cast ==
- Jayaram as Devadas Sargavedi
- Remya Nambeesan as Jyothi
- Sajitha Madathil as Sudharma
- Joy Mathew as G. Krishnakumar
- K. P. A. C. Lalitha as Radhamani
- P. Balachandran as Vikraman Pilla
- Hareesh Peradi as KPAC Bharathan
- Mukundan as Babykuttan
- Malavika Menon as Priyamvada Devadas
- Sethu Lakshmi
- Chembil Ashokan as Abubacker
- Jayaraj Warrier as Kadavoor Manikandan
- Shankar Ramakrishnan
- Balaji Sarma
- Sudheer Karamana
- Sasi Kalinga as Malakha Johnson
- Sunil Sukhada as Mapranam Pappachan
- Vjjayan Peringodu
- Divya Prabha as Haseena
- Lal Jose as Himself (Cameo)

== Soundtrack ==
Nadan

Soundtrack album by Ouseppachan
- Released: November 2013
- Recorded: Chetana Sound Studios, Thrissur
- Genre: Soundtrack
- Label: East Coast Audios

The songs of Nadan were composed by Ouseppachan and penned by Prabha Varma and Madhu Vasudevan.

Track	Song title	Lyricist	Singer(s)
1	"Ethu Sundara"	Prabha Varma	Shweta Mohan
2	"Moolivarunna"	Madhu Vasudevan	G. Sreeram, Mridula Warrier
3	"Ottaykku Paadunna"	Madhu Vasudevan	Vaikom Vijayalakshmi
4	"Sargavedhikale"	Madhu Vasudevan	Sharath, Praveen, Rahul R. Nath, Lekshmi Priya
5	"Ethu Sundara"	Prabha Varma	Najim Arshad
6	"Ottaykku Paadunna"	Madhu Vasudevan	Nishad
7	"Ottaykku Paadunna" (Violin)		Bhavya Lakshmi

== Awards ==
Kerala State Film Awards

- Best Lyricist - Prabha Varma (for Ethu Sundara) and Madhu Vasudevan (for Ottaykku Paadunna)
- Best Music Director - Ouseppachan (for Ethu Sundara and Ottaykku Paadunna)
- Best Female Singer - Vaikom Vijayalakshmi (for Ottaykku Paadunna)

Vayalar Film Awards

- Best Film - Anilkumar Ambalakkara
- Best Actor - Jayaram
- Best Music Director - Ouseppachan
- Best Male Singer - G. Sreeram

Kerala-Film-Critics-Association-Awards

- Best sound editor - Tapas Nayik
