= Dweepu =

- Directed by: Ramu Kariat
- Written by: Ramu Kariat; Vijayan Karote
- Screenplay by: Ramu Kariat; Vijayan Karote
- Produced by: NP Abu
- Starring: Jose; Shobha; Kuttyedathi Vilasini; Alleppey Ashraf
- Cinematography: Ramachandra Babu
- Edited by: Hrishikesh Mukherjee
- Music by: Songs: M. S. Baburaj; Score: Salil Chowdhury
- Production company: Priya Films
- Distributed by: Priya Films
- Release date: 13 February 1977
- Country: India
- Language: Malayalam

Dweepu is a 1977 Indian Malayalam film, directed by Ramu Kariat. The film stars Jose, Shobha, Kuttyedathi Vilasini and Alleppey Ashraf in the lead roles. The film has musical score by Salil Chowdhury and original songs by M. S. Baburaj.

== Plot ==
Chandran is an unemployed young man from a poor family, struggling to earn a living. His fortunes change when he gets a job as a teacher in Lakshadweep. Relocating for the job is a fresh start, but would moving away resolve all of his fundamental life problems?

== Cast ==
- Jose as Chandran
- Shobha
- Kuttyedathi Vilasini
- Alleppey Ashraf
- Prathapachandran as Chandran's Father
- Aboobacker as Hassan
- Baby Ambika
- KPAC Premachandran
- Kedamangalam Ali
- Lakshmisre
- Prathima
- Salim Raj
- Abbas
- Surabhi Sundhar
- Bhasi K Nair
- Dr. Madhavan Nair
- Shafi
- Ani
- Geetha
- Anna
- Eenashu
- Vijaykumar
- Prasad
- Paravanna
- P.C George

== Soundtrack ==
The music was composed by Salil Chowdhury and M.S. Baburaj, with the former composing the film score and latter the songs. The lyrics for five songs were written by Yusufali Kechery, and one song by Vayalar Ramavarma.

No.	Song	Singers	Lyrics	Length (m:ss)
1	"Aaranyaanthara" (Bit)	Kalanilayam Rajasekharan	Vayalar Ramavarma	
2	"Allithaamara Mizhiyaale"	P. Jayachandran	Yusufali Kechery	
3	"Kadale Neelakkadale"	Talat Mahmood	Yusufali Kechery	
4	"Kanneerin Mazhayathum"	P. Susheela	Yusufali Kechery	
5	"Kanneerin Mazhayathum"	Kalyani Menon	Yusufali Kechery	
6	"Manimeghappallakkil"	P. Jayachandran	Yusufali Kechery	

== Additional information ==
This was Jose's debut movie. He has since acted in nearly 100 movies.
