= Surasu =

Indian playwright and actor

Surasu was a Malayalam–language playwright and actor from Kerala, India. He introduced to Malayali audiences a new genre of drama known as mozhiyattam which is a fusion of poetry and theatre. He won the Kerala Sahitya Akademi Award in 1977 for the play Vishwaroopam which is regarded as his best work. Surasu wrote the script for some Malayalam films such as Randu Penkuttikal. He also acted in a few films, such as Manninte Maril (1979) and Moonnam Pakkam (1988). 'Surasu' was his screen name selected by himself and literally that word means an alcoholic. Surasu was married to drama artist Ambujam Surasu, but the couple did not have children. He took his life at Kottayam railway station in 1995.

Since 2004, a drama festival is organised every year in Kozhikode, Kerala in memory of Surasu. The festival was earlier known as Surasu Drama Festival but has been renamed as Kozhikodan Drama Festival since 2010.

== Filmography ==
1. Manninte Maril (1979)
2. Sradham (1994)
3. Moonnam Pakkam (1988)
4. Kakkothikkavile Appooppan Thaadikal (1988)
5. Aparan (1988)
6. Theertham (1987)
7. Randupenkuttikal (1978)
8. Panchamritham (1977)
9. Srishti (1976)
10. Mohiniyattam (1976)
11. Aruthu (1976)
12. Kamadhenu (1976)
13. Ajayanum Vijayanum (1976)
14. Criminals (Kayangal) (1975)
15. Chattambikkalyaani (1975)...Settu
16. Kalyanapanthal (1975)
17. Loveletter (1975)
18. Velicham Arike (1975)
19. Darshnam (1973)
