= Moonnam Pakkam =

- Directed by: Padmarajan
- Written by: Padmarajan
- Produced by: Balan
- Starring: Jayaram; Thilakan
- Cinematography: Venu
- Edited by: B. Lenin
- Music by: Ilaiyaraaja
- Production company: Gandhimathi Films
- Distributed by: Gandhimathi Films
- Release date: 9 November 1988
- Country: India
- Language: Malayalam

Moonnam Pakkam (English: The third day) is a 1988 Indian Malayalam-language drama film written and directed by Padmarajan. It stars Jayaram and Thilakan, along with Kirti Singh, Jagathi Sreekumar, Rahman, Ashokan, Ajayan and Surasu in supporting roles. Kirti and Ajayan made their debut in this film.

The film was released on Diwali day of 9 November 1988. The film was a commercial success. Thilakan's performance was considered one of his most memorable performances.

== Plot ==
Thampi, who retired as an accountant from the Indian Railways in the mid-1980s following his son's death, leads a solitary life in his ancestral house. His grandson Bhasker, also known as Bhasi or Pachu, is pursuing his medical studies at Bangalore Medical College. Thampi is excited when Bhasi comes with his friends Lopez, Ranjith Menon, and Krishnankutty to spend his vacation with his grandfather. Their presence brings joy and happiness into Thampi's house. Bhasi is engaged to Bhadra, the granddaughter of Thampi's friend, a doctor.

During the vacation, Bhasi and his friends often go to the nearby beach for a swim. During one such visit, Bhasi and Lopez are pulled into the ocean, and only Lopez manages to escape. The police and locals conduct a rescue operation, but in vain. Locals believe whatever the ocean takes is returned on the third day (as meant by the title of the movie).

Thampi refuses to acknowledge the fact that Bhasi is dead and puts on a brave face, consoling Bhasi's mother, his friends, and Bhadra. Eventually, Bhasi's body is found on the third day. The funeral is held on the same day, and Bhasi's friends get ready to leave the day after. They all visit the beach one last time to say goodbye to Bhasi, where they see Thampi arriving with priests to perform Bhasi's funeral rites.

While performing the "bali," Thampi, who had lost all hope, takes the rice ball, "balichoru", in his hands. While taking the "balichoru", Thampi remembers the young Bhasi swimming in the sea. Having lost all hope, Thampi proceeds to the sea. To everyone's shock, Thampi, along with the "balichoru," submits himself to the sea and commits suicide.

== Cast ==
- Thilakan as Thampi, RTD accountant Indian Railways
- Jayaram as Bhaskar aka Bhasi or Pachu, a medical student
- Kirti Singh as Bhadra, Bhasi's love interest
- Rahman as Lopez
- Ashokan as Ranjith Menon
- Ajayan Adoor as Krishnankutty
- Jagathi Sreekumar as Kavala
- Surasu as Doctor
- Soman as Kurup
- Jayabharathi as Bhanu, Bhasi's Mother
- Sulakshana as Bhasi's cousin
- Ragini as Bhasi's Aunt
- Thesni Khan as Vani, Bhadra's friend
- Venu Nagavally as Jayan, Thampi's late son and Bhasi's late father
- Krishna Prasad
- Jagathy N. K. Achary as Thampi's Friend

== Production ==
Major portions of the film were shot in Kanyakumari and its surrounding areas. The locations include Colachel, where the ancestral house is set, and Vatta Kottai, where the fort scene and the song "Thamarakkili" were filmed. The film's art direction was handled by Kurian Sabarigiri, makeup was done by Mohandas, and Indrans designed the costumes. Surya Jones worked as the film's still photographer. Malayalam playwright Surasu played a significant role in the film as Thampi's closest friend and Bhadra's grandfather. Another playwright, Jagathy N. K. Achary, made a cameo appearance as one of Thampi's friends in the film.

== Soundtrack ==
All lyrics are written by Sreekumaran Thampi; all music is composed by Ilaiyaraaja.

Track listing
| No. | Title | Artist(s) | Length |
|---|---|---|---|
| 1. | "Niramaala ( Unarumee Gaanam )" (Pathos) | G. Venugopal |
| 2. | "Thaamarakkili Paadunnu" | K. S. Chithra, M. G. Sreekumar, Ilaiyaraaja |
| 3. | "Unarumee Gaanam" | G. Venugopal, Chorus |

== Contemporary reception ==
In 2019, Aradhya Kurup of The News Minute wrote, " It's a breezy watch till a few scenes before climax. But after that you witness one of the most traumatic climax scenes in Malayalam cinema. And Thilakan's performance is such that you go through the whole rollercoaster ride with him." The New Indian Express wrote, "A youthful Jayaram and versatile Thilakan produce a unforgettable display of love and affection between a widower and his grandchild. Thilakan's Thampi is as good as his Kochuvava from Kattukuthira (1990) or Achuthan Nair from Kireedam (1989) and Chenkol (1993), establishing his contendership for the best actor ever in Malayalam."

== Awards ==
G. Venugopal won the Kerala State Film Award for Best Singer for the song "Unarumee Gaanam".
