= Live (2023 film) =

2023 Malayalam film

- Theatrical release poster
- Directed by: V. K. Prakash
- Written by: S. Suresh Babu
- Produced by: Darrpan Bangejaa; Nitin Kumar
- Starring: Mamta Mohandas; Soubin Shahir; Shine Tom Chacko; Priya Prakash Varrier
- Cinematography: Nikhil S. Praveen
- Edited by: Sunil S. Pillai
- Music by: Alphons Joseph
- Production company: Films 24
- Release date: 26 May 2023
- Country: India
- Language: Malayalam

Live is a 2023 Indian Malayalam-language thriller film written and directed by V. K. Prakash. The film stars Mamta Mohandas, Soubin Shahir, Shine Tom Chacko, Priya Prakash Varrier, Krishna Prabha, Reshmi Soman and Twinkle Joby. The film is produced Darppan Bangejja and Nitin Kumar under the banner of Films 24. The film was released on 26 May 2023.

== Plot ==
Anna is the victim of a fake news. She joins forces with Dr. Amala, who's also facing cyber harassment. And they both come together to fight against the media mafia.

== Cast ==
- Mamta Mohandas as Dr. Amala Sriram
- Soubin Shahir as Sriram
- Shine Tom Chacko as Sam John Vakathanam
- Priya Prakash Varrier as Anna
- Krishna Praba
- Reshmi Soman as Dr. Nikhila
- Twinkle Joby

== Production ==
The first look poster of the film was released on 16 March 2023. Later trailer was released and the production team announced that the film will be release on release on 12 May and the film was postponed to 26 May 2023.

== Reception ==
Swathi P. Ajith of Onmanorama wrote that "However, considering the significant theme it presents, Live can still be considered a must-watch". Anandu Suresh of IndianExpress.com gave two stars out of five and wrote that "In short, Live joins the ranks of other Malayalam films that, despite attempting to tackle a socially relevant subject, fail to grasp its true purpose." Vignesh Madhu of 1.5 our 5 rating and stated that "Shine Tom Chacko's lively act is the only saving grace in this well-intentioned but ineffective film".

S. R. Praveen of The Hindu stated that "The makers of Live seem to have given much thought on the subject they are dealing with, but not much on how they would portray it on-screen. It thus ends up as a weak take on a relevant issue."
