= Kuttyedathi Vilasini =

Indian actress

- Born: Thrissur, India
- Other name: Kozhikode Vilasini
- Occupation: Actress
- Years active: 1971–present

Kuttyedathi Vilasini is an Indian actress best known for her work in Malayalam cinema. She has acted in more than 400 films and 120 TV serials.

== Biography ==
Vilasini was born in Thrissur, Kerala. Her portrayal of the titular character in the Vasudevan Nair film Kuttyedathi won her the prefix for her name. She received Kerala State film award for second best actress in 1976 for Dweepu.

== Awards ==
- 1976 Kerala State Film Award for Second Best Actress – Dweepu
- 2011 Nadaka Prathibha Award by United Dramatic Academy (U.D.A)
- 2011 Nilambur Balan award

== Filmography ==
List of Kuttyedathi Vilasini film credits
Year	Title	Role	Notes
1962	Palattu Koman		
1964	Thacholi Othenan		
1967	Kunjali Marakkar		
1969	Aalmaram		
1969	Kadalpalam		
1971	Kuttyedathi	Malu	
1972	Panimudakku	Dakshyayani	
1973	Chukku	Mary	
1973	Masappady Mathupillai	Aalkkoottathil Eliyamma	
1974	Poonthenaruvi	Lakshmi	
1977	Dweepu		
1977	Taxi Driver		
1977	Choondakkari		
1978	Kodiyettam	Sarojini	
1978	Agni		
1978	Thanal		
1979	Manninte Maril		
1979	Thenthulli		
1979	Kanalattam		
1979	Hridayathil Nee Mathram		
1979	Ottapettavar		
1979	Kummatty		
1980	Angadi	Khadeeja	
1980	Ashwaradham	Ammu	
1981	Ahimsa	Lakshmi	
1981	Orikkal Koodi		
1981	Thraasam		
1982	Ponmudy	Radhamma	
1982	Gaanam		
1982	Yavanika	Ammini	
1982	Vaarikuzhi		
1983	Surumaitta Kannukal		
1983	Father Damien		
1983	Visa	Nalini's mother	
1983	Astapadi	Kavamma	
1984	Swarna Gopuram		
1984	Swantham Sarika	Basheer's mother	
1984	Ulppathi		
1984	Athirathram		
1984	Appunni	Kalyaniyamma	
1984	Ivide Thudangunnu	Babu's mother	
1984	Thacholi Thankappan	Devu	
1985	Mounanombaram	Sathi's mother	
1986	Meenamasathile Sooryan		
1986	Neram Pularumbol		
1987	Naalkavala		
1987	Chanthayil Choodi Vilkkunna Pennu		
1987	Rithubhedam		
1988	Ore Thooval Pakshikal		
1990	Arhatha		
1990	Vembanad		
1990	Kadathanadan Ambadi		
1992	Tharavadu		
1993	Sthalathe Pradhana Payyans		
1993	Mithunam	Shyama's Kunjamma	
1993	Manichitrathazhu	Thampi's wife	
1993	Aayirappara		
1994	Nandini Oppol		
1994	Sukrutham	Durga's mother	
1995	Mannar Mathai Speaking	Sakunthala's mother	
1995	Agnidevan		
1996	Oru Abhibhashakante Case Diary		
1996	Mookkilla Rajyathu Murimookkan Rajavu		
1996	Kudumbakodathi	Chandramathi	
1997	Ishtadanam	Naani	
1997	Moksham		
1997	Shobhanam		
1998	Kottaram Veettile Apputtan	Kunjulakshmi Amma	
1999	Kannezhuthi Pottum Thottu	Moosakutty's mother	
1999	Rushy Vamsam		
1999	The Godman		
2000	Unnimaya		
2000	Kinnara Thumbikal	Janaki	
2001	Theerthadanam	Parukutti	
2001	Payyan		
2002	Ente Hridayathinte Udama		
2002	Indraneelakkallu		
2002	Mayilpeelithalu		
2003	Margam	Kathreenamma	
2008	Bioscope	Ammini	
2013	Mizhi		
2013	Vazhiyariyaathe		
2014	Tharangal	Herself	photo only
2018	Angu Doore Oru Deshathu		
2019	Madhaveeyam	Chechiyamma	
2024	Krouryam		
2024	Ee Bandham Supera		

== Plays ==
- Pooja
- Srishti
- Kunthi
- Madangal Garjikkunnu
- Samasya
- Vellakuthirakal
- Kasthooriman
- MLA
- Sthithi
- Samharam (The Annihilation)
- Sakshatkaram (The Fulfillment)
- Samanwayam (The Union)

== TV serials ==
- 2018-Neelakkuyil (TV series) (Asianet)
- 2017-Vanambadi (TV series) (Asianet)
- 2016-Aluvayum Mathikkariyum (Asianet Plus)
- 2016- Athmasakhi (Mazhavil Manorama)
- Mayamadhavam (Surya TV)
- 2006-Nombarappoovu (Asianet)
- 2005-Pavakoothu (Amrita TV)
- 2005- Kadamattathu Kathanar (Asianet)
- 2004- Sthree Oru Santhwanam (Asianet)
- 2002–2003- Akkarapacha (Asianet)
- Thaali
- Jwalayai
- Pakida Pakida Pambaram
- Angadipattu

== Album ==
- Sreekrishna Jyothi
