= Venal Kinavukal =

1991 Indian film

- Directed by: K. S. Sethumadhavan
- Screenplay by: M. T. Vasudevan Nair
- Starring: Sudheesh; Yadu Krishnan; Krishna Prasad; Monisha
- Cinematography: Vasanth Kumar
- Edited by: M. S. Mani
- Music by: L. Vaidyanathan
- Production company: Sarangi Films
- Distributed by: Sarangi Films
- Release date: 1991
- Country: India
- Language: Malayalam

Venal Kinavukal (transl. Summer dreams) is a 1991 Indian Malayalam-language drama film directed by K. S. Sethumadhavan and written by M. T. Vasudevan Nair. The film stars Sudheesh, Yadu Krishnan, Krishna Prasad, and Monisha. The film has musical score by L. Vaidyanathan. This was the last Malayalam film of Sethhmadhavan, who made three more movies before retiring from film industry.

== Plot ==
Story begins with the last examination of first year predegree students. There is a group of four friends who studies in the same class. Anil is son of Gopalakrishnan Nair who wants his son to study well and prosper, and he constantly advises his son to concentrate more on his education. Anil has a crush on his cousin Sathi who is also his next door neighbour. Sathi is aware of Anil's interest but she always ignores him. Subramanya Iyer or Subbudu is a meek son of Venkita Raman Iyer, from an orthodox Tamil Brahmin family. Bhasi is from a rich family and has an elder sister Malini, who is betrothed to a doctor Balan, about which Bhasi is not happy. Ravi is a straightforward practical guy who knows well about his limitations. During the early days of their summer vacation, they all meet up with their old friend David who has moved to Chennai. David tells them the sleazy experiences he had in the city, which influence Subbu and Bhasi.

Subbu accidentally meets Jaanu, who is a distant relative of Ramu, an acquaintance. She flirts with him which is exploited by Ramu, who takes money from Subbu which was given to him to pay his computer class fees.

Anil meets Margarette, a foreign girl who was learning Kathakali under a teacher in his native. They become friends and he assists her to visit places and roam around the town, making his cousin jealous. Bhasi has his eyes on a new servant girl in his house, and tries to make advances on her with the help of David.

Anil falls in love with Margarette and plans to accompany her to a trip. Unfortunately her boyfriend comes to town and Anil is heartbroken to learn that she had loved him only as a friend.

Subbu starts a physical relationship with Janu and he's blackmailed by Ramu for more money. One day he's told that she is pregnant with his child and Subbu gets scared beyond wits. His father gets to know his bunking of computer classes and he finds porn magazines in his room. Ramu comes to Subbu's house with Janu and starts blackmailing them, with Subbu nowhere to be found.

Bhasi after failing in many attempts to have sex with his servant girl, drinks heavily one day and he forces on her, only to find that it was his sister instead of his servant, who hits him in anger. His father finds out about his creepiness and slaps him.

Venkata Iyer comes to Anil's home and tells his father about their visit to the bar and Subbu's disappearance. Ravi finds a letter from Subbu informing them that he has left the town in shame and has no plans of coming back. Anil visits Bhasi and sees his lifeless body hanging in his room, as he committed suicide due to shame. Anil gets a shock and becomes unconscious. Later when he wakes up in the hospital, his father consoles him, telling that he has got first class in his exams. His cousin finally shows affection towards him.

== Cast ==
- Sudheesh as Anil. G. Nair
- Yadu Krishnan as Bhasi
- Krishna Prasad as Subramanya Iyyer/Subbudu
- Sudheesh Sankar as Ravi
- Girish as David John
- Nedumudi Venu as Venkitta Raman Iyyer
- Thilakan as Gopalakrishan Nair
- Mamukoya as Ramu
- M. G. Sasi as Dr. Balan
- Monisha as Malini Kurup
- Jagannatha Varma as Krishna Kurup
- Santhakumari as Lakshmi
- Kannan Parali as Hari
- David as Andre
- Hena as Margeratte Miller
- Master Sudheesh Chandran as Unni Balan
- Sharmily as Jaanu
- Durga as Sathi
- Priya as Devaki

== Soundtrack ==
The music was composed by L. Vaidyanathan and the lyrics were written by O. N. V. Kurup.

No.	Song	Singers	Length (m:ss)
1	"Aakaashamedakku"	K. J. Yesudas, Chorus	
2	"Gouri Manohari"	K. J. Yesudas	
3	"Peraattin Akkareyakkare"	K. J. Yesudas	
4	"Poroo Poroo"	K. J. Yesudas, Sunanda	
