= Thiruvambadi Thamban =

2012 Malayalam action film

- Directed by: M. Padmakumar
- Written by: S. Suresh Babu
- Produced by: Alexander John
- Starring: Jayaram; Jagathy Sreekumar; Kishore; Nedumudi Venu; Haripriya
- Cinematography: Manoj Pillai
- Edited by: Samjith Mohammed
- Music by: Ouseppachan
- Production company: Jini Cinema
- Distributed by: Jini Cinema
- Release date: 25 May 2012
- Running time: 164 minutes
- Country: India
- Language: Malayalam

Thiruvambadi Thamban is a 2012 Indian Malayalam-language action thriller film sdirected by M. Padmakumar and written by S. Suresh Babu. It stars Jayaram in the lead role and also marks the debut of Kishore in Malayalam cinema. It also stars Jagathy Sreekumar, Nedumudi Venu and Samuthirakani in supporting roles.

== Plot ==
Thiruvambadi Thamban Tharakan is a prominent businessman in Thrissur and hails from a family that have been supplying elephants for temple processions for years. He is given company by Anjali who is a Brahmin girl. On the way back to Kerala from the Gajamela at Sonepur, Thamban's father Mathan happens to confront Shaktivel in Madurai. Shaktivel is a cruel politician and Mathan fails to understand that he rules the place and accidentally kills his younger brother Shiva. Soon, in a fast tracked series of events, Shaktivel and his men go in search for Mathan to avenge Shiva's death. Thamban follows a never ending travail of son trying to save Mathan from an extremely dangerous enemy.

== Cast ==
- Jayaram as:
  - Thiruvambadi Thamban Tharakan
  - Thiruvambadi Ulahannan Tharakan (Photo & Flashback Presence)
- Jagathy Sreekumar as Thiruvambadi Mathan Tharakan
- Kishore as Shakthivel
- Nedumudi Venu as Kunjoonju
- Samuthirakani as Ramanujam
- Haripriya as Anjali
- Jayaprakash as Kishore
- Karate Raja as Shiva, Shaktivel's brother
- Sreejith Ravi as Sajan
- T. G. Ravi as Xavier
- Jayaraj Warrier
- Shaju as Kannan
- Janardhanan as Kunjachan
- V. K. Sreeraman as Vishwanathan, Anjali's father
- Nandu as Rarichan, Thamban's friend
- Babu Namboothiri as Achuvettan
- Sreelatha Namboothiri as Grandmother of Thamban
- Anil Murali as a Santhosh, Policeman
- Santhosh as Parameshwaran
- Sreekutty
- Chali Pala as Stephen
- Sunil Sukhada as Fr. Alex Tharakan
- Vimal Kumar as Peter, Thamban's friend
- Jijoy Rajagopal
- Rebecca Santhosh as Child artist

== Production ==
The film was launched by Mammootty in Kerala. The first schedule was filmed in Bihar at the Gajamela in Sonepur. The second schedule started from 27 November in Thrissur in which Thambi Ramaiah and Kishore joined the crew marking their debut in Malayalam films. Sneha was initially cast in the film, but later opted out due to date issues. She was replaced by Kannada actress Haripriya.

== Reception ==
Thiruvambaadi Thambaan was released to mixed and positive reviews.

== Awards ==
| Ceremony | Category | Nominee | Result |
|---|---|---|---|
| 2nd South Indian International Movie Awards | Best Actor in a Negative Role | Kishore | Nominated |
