= Ammakilikkoodu =

- Directed by: M. Padmakumar
- Written by: Ranjith
- Produced by: Raghunath
- Starring: Prithviraj Sukumaran; Navya Nair; Kaviyoor Ponnamma; Saritha; Mukesh
- Cinematography: Shaji Kumar
- Edited by: Ranjan Abraham
- Music by: Score: Rajamani; Songs: Raveendran
- Release date: 26 November 2003
- Country: India
- Language: Malayalam

Ammakilikkoodu is a 2003 Indian Malayalam-language film written by Ranjith and directed by M. Padmakumar (in his directorial debut). It stars Prithviraj Sukumaran and Navya Nair.

== Plot ==
Vivek takes a job as the manager of Karunalayam, a retirement home. He meets a young woman called Akhila, whose complaint had sent her stepfather to jail for abusing her mentally ill mother, and they fall in love. Karunalayam is financially in a bad state and the owner Eraadi wants to sell it off, but Vivek tries his best to save the retirement house, since the residents have nowhere else to go. Akhila's father is Siddharthan, who was poor and married Akhila's mother for money and her properties, as she was from a very wealthy family. As Akhila's grandfather died, Siddharthan learned that Akhila's grandfather did not gave any share of the properties to Akhila's mother. Siddharthan then leaves them. Akhila's uncle comes to Karunlayam to take Akhila and her mother to the tharavad (ancestral home). Vivek is saddened when Akhila leaves from Karunalayam, one of the mothers in Karunalayam asks him whether he loves Akhila to which he replies that he is not so lucky. Vivek plans to sell his kidney for 5 lakhs for saving the Karunalayam home. Eraadi learns about this, and feels sympathy for Vivek so Eraadi gives all his properties to Vivek. At last Akhila and her mother go to Karunalayam with two surprises for Vivek; one is to give a blank cheque to Vivek for keeping the mothers safe in Karunalayam and second is to fix the date for engagement of Akhila and Vivek.

== Cast ==
- Prithviraj Sukumaran as Vivek Menon
- Navya Nair as Akhila
- Mukesh as Collector Mohan Paul
- Sai Kumar as Siddharth
- Vijayaraghavan as Rajan
- Innocent as Eradi
- Saritha as Janaki
- Kaviyoor Ponnamma as Marykutty Teacher
- Jagathy Sreekumar as Arnose
- K. P. A. C. Lalitha as Saraswathy Amma
- Sukumari as Parvathy Ammal
- Mallika Sukumaran as Saramma
- Madhupal as Company Manager
- Mamukkoya as Pareekutty
- Vijayakumari as Kousalya
- Santha Devi as Lakshmi
- Santhakumari
- Anil Murali
- V. K. Sreeraman as Priest
- Unni Sivapal
- Sreehari as SI
- Kozhikode Sharada as Kumari
- Meena Ganesh

== Soundtrack ==
All lyrics are written by Kaithapram; all music is composed by Raveendran.

Track listing
No.	Title	Singer(s)	Length
1.	"Vennakal Kottara"	K. J. Yesudas	4:06
2.	"Ammakili Koodithil"	M. G. Sreekumar	4:48
3.	"Hradayageethamay (F)"	P. Susheela	4:12
4.	"Hradayageethamay (M)"	M. G. Sreekumar	4:12
5.	"Enthine Pattinu (Duet)"	Vijay Yesudas, Radhika Thilak	4:22
6.	"Enthine Pattinu (F)"	Radhika Thilak	4:22
7.	"Ponkudu (M)"	P. Jayachandran	4:06
Total length:			30:06
