= Manninte Maril =

- Directed by: P. A. Bakker
- Written by: Cherukad
- Screenplay by: MT Vasudevan Nair
- Produced by: N. Parameswaran Nair
- Starring: P. J. Antony; Kaloor Sudhakaran; Kunjandi; Sathaar; Surasu; Kutyedathi Vilasini
- Cinematography: Vipin Das
- Edited by: Ravi
- Music by: G. Devarajan
- Release date: 12 November 1979
- Country: India
- Language: Malayalam

Manninte Maril (English: In the Bosom of the Earth) is a 1979 Indian Malayalam film, directed by P. A. Bakker, based on Cherukad's novel Manninte Maril. The film stars P. J. Antony in a lead role. The film has musical score by G. Devarajan.

== Cast ==
- P. J. Antony
- Kaloor Sudhakaran
- Kunjandi
- Sathaar
- Surasu
- Kutyedathi Vilasini

== Soundtrack ==
The music was composed by G. Devarajan and the lyrics were written by O. N. V. Kurup.

No.	Song	Singers	Lyrics	Length (m:ss)
1	"Kunnimani Maalacharthi"	P. Madhuri, Chorus	O. N. V. Kurup	
2	"Orukai Irukai"	P. Madhuri, Chorus	O. N. V. Kurup	

== Additional information ==
Manninte Maril was actor P.J. Antony's last movie. He died in March 1979.
