= Oruthee =

- Poster
- Directed by: V. K. Prakash
- Written by: S. Suresh Babu
- Produced by: K. V. Abdul Nazar
- Starring: Navya Nair; Vinayakan; Saiju Kurup
- Cinematography: Jimshi Khalid
- Edited by: Lijo Paul
- Music by: Gopi Sundar; Thakara
- Production company: Benzy Productions
- Distributed by: Magic Frames
- Release date: 18 March 2022
- Running time: 135 minutes
- Country: India
- Language: Malayalam

Oruthee (transl. One Woman, also a play on the translation of 'One fire') is a 2022 Indian Malayalam-language crime thriller film directed by V. K. Prakash. Produced by K. V. Abdul Nazar under the banner of Benzy Productions, the screenplays of the film was written by S. Suresh Babu. Marking her return to Malayalam cinema after 10 years, it stars Navya Nair, Vinayakan, and Saiju Kurup. The cinematography of the film was done by Jimshi Khalid and was edited by Lijo Paul. Gopi Sundar and the band Thakara composed the soundtrack, with lyrics written by B. K. Harinarayanan, Alankode Leelakrishnan, and Abru Manoj. The movie is about a mother in city and the hardships she has to face while paying the hospital for her daughter's accident. The film was based on a true story.

== Premise ==
Antony is a SI in the city, while Radhamani is a middle-class woman who is a boat conductor. She has to face shocking events and she fights to survive the trauma. Things take a deadly turn as she fights back forms the story. Antony helps her to solve out the problem.

== Cast ==
- Navya Nair as C. K. Radhamani, SWTD Conductor
- Vinayakan as Ernakulam South Police Station CI C.K. Antony
- Mukundan as Ernakulam South Police Station ASI V.Hari
- Saiju Kurup as Sreekumar, Radhamani's Husband and Gulf employee
- KPAC Lalitha as Bharathi, Radhamani's Mother
- Master Adithyan as Adityan Sreekumar/Appu, Radhamani's Son
- Baby Adithi as Malavika Sreekumar/Malu, Radhamani's Daughter
- Santhosh Keezhattoor as HRR Jewelerry Manager, Manoj Kumar
- Vaisakh Vijayan as Vineeth, Radhamani's brother
- Kalabhavan Haneef as Peroorkada Police Station ASI Kurian
- Sreedevi Varma as Gouriamma, Sreekumar's Mother
- Aparna Nair as Suja, Antony's wife
- Malavika Menon as Sister Amala
- Arun Gosh as Dr. Ranjith K.R.

== Production ==
=== Filming ===
Oruthee commenced principal photography in January 2020. The filming was concluded in one schedule on March, carried out primarily at Kochi.

== Release ==
=== Theatrical ===
The film was released on 18 March 2022 to positive reviews.

== Reception ==
=== Critical reception ===
For Firstpost, film critic Anna M. M. Vetticad ranked it sixth in her year-end list of the best Malayalam films. Deepa Soman of The Times of India gave it a rating of 3.5/5 calling it "An empowering tale of a woman's fight for justice" and praising the performances of Vinayakan and Navya Nair. Sajin Shrijith of The New Indian Express calls it one of VKP's finest films.
