= Mizhikal Sakshi =

2008 Indian film

- DVD cover
- Directed by: Asok R. Nath
- Written by: Anil Mukhathala
- Produced by: V. R. Das
- Starring: Mohanlal; Sukumari
- Cinematography: Ramachandra Babu
- Edited by: Vipin Manoor
- Music by: V. Dakshinamoorthy; Kaithapram Vishwanathan Nambudiri
- Production company: Cyber Vision
- Distributed by: Jofrey Release
- Release date: 20 June 2008
- Running time: 115 minutes
- Country: India
- Language: Malayalam

Mizhikal Sakshi (transl. Eyes as witness) is a 2008 Indian Malayalam-language drama film directed by Asok R. Nath and written by Anil Mukhathala. The film stars Mohanlal and Sukumari. The plot follows Kooniyamma, a mute and bereaved old woman who has fond memories of her dead son, wandering around in destitute.

== Plot ==
A mother goes into a state of shock upon learning that her son was falsely accused as a terrorist and was sentenced to death by hanging. Eventually, she loses her mental balance.

== Cast ==
- Mohanlal as Syed Ahmed
- Sukumari as Kooniyamma/Nabisa
- Nedumudi Venu as Lebba Sahib
- Vineeth as Aravind
- Manoj K. Jayan as Adithyan Varma
- Mala Aravindan as Kadarukutty Musailar
- Renuka as Ambili's mother
- Krishna as Ambili
- Dinesh Panicker as Devaswom Manager
- Krishna Prasad as Feroz
- Kochu Premam as Vasudeva Valyaathan
- Ramu Mangalapalli as Keezhshanti
- Satheesh Menon as Marampally
- Kailas Nath as Melshanti

== Soundtrack ==
The soundtrack was composed by V. Dakshinamoorthy and Kaithapram Viswanathan Namboothiri. The lyrics were written by O. N. V Kurup.

Track #	Song	Artist(s)	Raga
1	"Amme Neeyoru"	K. J. Yesudas	
2	"Chethiyum Chemparathi"	K. S. Chithra	
3	"Manjutharasree"	Aparna Rajeev	Ananda Bhairavi
4	"Thazhampoo Thottilil"	S. Janaki	

== Release ==
Mizhikal Sakshi was released on 20 June 2008. G. Jayakumar of The Hindu described the film as "a poignant tale" which is "worth watching" and praised the performance of Sukumari, stating that "Sukumari's performance tugs at the heartstrings of the viewer [...] so long as this character appears on screen, the film keeps tugging at the heartstrings".
