= Coolie (1983 Malayalam film) =

- Directed by: Ashok Kumar
- Written by: Priyadarshan
- Produced by: Sooryodaya Creation
- Starring: Ratheesh; Mammootty; Shankar; Lalu Alex
- Music by: Raveendran
- Distributed by: Dinny Release
- Release date: 11 May 1983
- Country: India
- Language: Malayalam

Coolie is a Malayalam language film which was released in 1983. It stars Ratheesh, Mammootty and Shankar in lead roles, directed by Ashok Kumar, produced by Sooryodaya Creation. It also has Lalu Alex, Sreenivasan and Nalini in supporting roles.

== Plot ==
The story revolves around the life of Sethu, Madhu and Kunjali, and all the events that surrounds them.

== Cast ==
- Ratheesh as Madhu
- Mammootty as Kunjali
- Shankar as Sethu
- Lalu Alex as Shaji
- Sreenivasan as Gopalan
- Nalini as Lekha
- Anuradha as Sreedevi
- Nithya
- C. I. Paul as Shekharan muthalaali
- Captain Raju
- Alummoodan as Shekharan's servant
- Sukumari as Sethu's mother
