= Thycaud Dharma Sastha Temple, Thiruvananthapuram =

Thycaud Dharma Sastha Temple
- Thycaud Dharma Sastha Temple, Thiruvananthapuram, Kerala

Religion
- Affiliation: Hinduism
- District: Thiruvananthapuram
- Deity: Dharma Sastha (Ayyappa Swamy)
- Festival: Mandala-Makara Vilakku

Location
- Location: Thiruvananthapuram
- State: Kerala
- Country: India
- Coordinates: 8°29′41.2″N 76°57′20.9″E

Architecture
- Type: Kerala Style Architecture

Specifications
- Temple: One
- Elevation: 53.17 m (174 ft)

Dharma Sastha Temple is a temple to Dharma Sastha at Thycaud in Thiruvananthapuram city, Kerala, India. It is over 300 years old and is administered by Nair Service Society.
