= The Filmstaar =

The Filmstar
- Directed by: Sanjeev Raj
- Written by: S. Suresh Babu
- Produced by: Joseph Thomas; Sanjeev Raj
- Starring: Kalabhavan Mani; Dileep
- Cinematography: Saloo George
- Edited by: P. C. Mohanan
- Music by: Benny Johnson; Vijayan Poonjaar
- Production company: Wide Screen Cinema
- Distributed by: Gaayathri Medias; Sandra's Communication
- Release date: 14 July 2011
- Country: India
- Language: Malayalam

The Filmstaar is a 2011 Indian Malayalam-language action-drama film directed by Sanjeev Raj. The film stars Kalabhavan Mani in title role while Dileep, Thalaivasal Vijay, Muktha George plays supporting roles. The film deals with the relationship between a film star and a villager. The film also features actress Rambha's in her last film appearance.

== Cast ==
- Kalabhavan Mani as Superstar Sooryakiran (Kannan)
- Dileep as Nandagopan Maligaveedu (Nandu)
- Muktha as Gowri, Nandagopan's sister
- Thalaivasal Vijay as Sakhavu Raghavan, Sooryakiran's father
- Suraj Venjarammoodu as Sugunan
- Devan as Minister Thamban
- Ganga
- Vijayaraghavan as Appayi
- Chali Pala as Varadaraja Chettiyar
- Salim Kumar
- Narayanankutty
- Ashokan as Director Aravindan
- Valsala Menon as Pankajakshi
- Baburaj
- Sadiq
- Krishna Prasad
- Anila Sreekumar as Janaki
- Jijoy Rajagopal as Stephen
- Kottayam Nazeer as Krishnan Karakulam
