= Vijaykumar =

Vijaykumar is an Indian name. Notable people with the name include:

- Paidikalva Vijaykumar (born 1986), Indian cricketer
- Sridevi Vijaykumar (born 1986), Indian actress
- Vijaykumar Rupani (born 1956), Indian politician
