= Madhu Vasudevan =

Indian author, lyricist, music critic

- Born: Alappuzha, Kerala, India
- Education: Sanatana Dharma College, CUSAT
- Occupations: Head of hindi department – Maharaja's College, Ernakulam, lyricist, music critic
- Writing career
- Language: Malayalam, English and Hindi
- Notable awards: 45th Kerala State Film Awards, Filmfare, SIIMA, Sahitya Akademi Award

Madhu Vasudevan is an Indian author, poet, lyricist and music critic who writes predominantly in Malayalam, English and Hindi. He was honored in the 45th Kerala State Film Awards, 64th Filmfare Awards South and 61st Filmfare Awards South for Best Lyricist. His songs from the movie Jalam were shortlisted for Oscar Award 2016 for original song category.

== Bibliography ==
- Samskritiyude Vyakaranam- 2001, ISBN 81-240-1027-7, published by Current Books, Kottayam
- Sangeethaswadanam- 2002, published by Kerala State Literacy Mission
- Sangeetharthamu – 2007, ISBN 978-81-264-1755-1, Paperback, D C Books, Kottayam
- Sangeetharthamu – 2018, ISBN 978-93-87866-08-9, republished by Sahithya Pravarthaka Co-Operative Society, Kottayam
- MDR – A unique octave in Music- ISBN 81-264-0598-8, DC Books, Kottayam – A study on Padmabhushan M. D. Ramanathan, an eminent Carnatic music vocalist with Illustrations by Artist Nampoothiri
- M.D. Ramanathan, Meaningful Pauses – 2009, 231 pages, ISBN 9788126425556, D.C. Books

== Awards ==
- 64th Filmfare Awards South for the best lyricist, 2017
- 3rd South Indian International Movie Awards (3rd SIIMA Awards) 2014, for best lyricist for the song "Ottakku Padunna" from Nadan
- 45th Kerala State Film Awards for best lyricist for the song "Ottakku Padunna" from the film Nadan
