= Madhaveeyam =

2019 film by Thejas Perumanna

- Directed by: Thejas Perumanna
- Written by: Thejas Perumanna, Sudhi
- Starring: Vineeth
- Cinematography: V. Aravind
- Edited by: Kapil Gopalakrishnan
- Music by: Sudhi
- Distributed by: Films
- Release date: 11 January 2019
- Country: India
- Language: Malayalam

Madhaveeyam is a 2019 Malayalam-language film produced by Sudheer Kumar and directed by Thejas Perumanna, starring Vineeth.

== Cast ==
- Vineeth as Madhav
- Geetha Vijayan
- Babu Namboothiri
- Kuttyedathi Vilasini
- Ambika Mohan
