= M. Padmakumar =

Indian film director

- Occupation: Film director
- Years active: 1988 – present

M. Padmakumar is an Indian film director working in Malayalam cinema. He began his career working as an assistant director to a number of leading directors and later became an independent director through Ammakilikkoodu in 2003. His best known works include Vaasthavam (2006), Shikkar (2010), Jalam (2015), Joseph (2018) and Mamangam (2019).

== Filmography ==
Films

=== Director ===
Year	Film	Production	Notes
2003	Ammakilikkoodu	Raghunath	
2006	Vargam	Hanees	
2006	Vaasthavam	Sreechakra Films Pvt. Ltd.	
2008	Parunthu	Houli Pottoor	
2009	Kerala Cafe	Ranjith	Anthology film, Segment: "Nostalgia"
2010	Shikkar	K. K. Rajagopal	
2012	Thiruvambadi Thamban	Alexander John	
2013	Ithu Pathiramanal	Dhanush Productions	
2013	Orissa	Heera Films	
2013	D Company	D Cuts Films Company	Anthology film, Segment: "Oru Bolivian Diary 1995"
2014	Polytechnic	Kala Nair	
2015	Kanal	Abaam Movies	
2015	Jalam	Aries Group	
2017	Aakashamittayee	Varnachitra Big Screen Studios India	Co-directed with Samuthirakani
2018	Joseph	Appu Pathu Pappu Production House	
2019	Mamangam	Kavya Films	
2022	Visithiran	B Studios; Shark Pictures	Tamil film; Tamil remake of Joseph
2022	Pathaam Valavu	United Global Media Productions	
2023	Queen Elizabeth	Blue Mount Production	
2026	Uyir	Vow Cinemas	

Television

Original broadcast	Series name	Network	Notes
12 December 2016 - 16 June 2017	Kayamkulam Kochunniyude Makan	Surya TV	TV Serial

=== Assistant director ===
Year	Film	Director	Notes
2017	Puthan Panam	Ranjith	Credited as "co-director"
2007	Rock n' Roll	Ranjith	
2005	Chandrolsavam	Ranjith	
2004	Black	Ranjith	
2003	Mizhi Randilum	Ranjith	
2001	Raavanaprabhu	Ranjith	
2000	Valliettan	Shaji Kailas	
2000	Narasimham (film)	Shaji Kailas	
1999	Aayiram Meni	I. V. Sasi	
1999	Vazhunnor	Joshiy	
1997	Aaraam Thampuran	Shaji Kailas	
1996	The Prince	Suresh Krishna	
1993	Devasuram	I. V. Sasi	
1992	Poochakkaru Mani Kettum	Thulasidas	
1992	Kallanum Polisum	I V Sasi	
1991	Neelagiri	I. V. Sasi	
1991	Inspector Balram	I. V. Sasi	
1991	Apoorvam Chilar	Kala Adoor	
1989	Oru Vadakkan Veeragatha	Hariharan	4th Assistant Director
1988	Aranyakam	Hariharan	4th Assistant Director
