= Shikkar =

2010 Indian film

- Theatrical release poster
- Directed by: M. Padmakumar
- Written by: S. Suresh Babu
- Produced by: K. K. Rajagopal
- Starring: Mohanlal; Kalabhavan Mani; Lalu Alex; Samuthirakani
- Cinematography: Manoj Pillai
- Edited by: Ranjan Abraham
- Music by: Songs: M. Jayachandran; Background Score: Ouseppachan
- Production company: Sreeraj Cinema's
- Distributed by: Maxlab Cinemas and Entertainments (India); PJ Entertainments (Europe)
- Release date: 11 September 2010 (India)
- Running time: 152 minutes
- Country: India
- Language: Malayalam
- Budget: ₹3.5 crore (US$360,000)
- Box office: ₹12 crore (US$1.2 million) (20 days)

Shikkar: The Hunt, or simply Shikkar (transl. Hunt/Hunter) is a 2010 Indian Malayalam-language action thriller film directed by M. Padmakumar, written by S. Suresh Babu, and produced by K. K. Rajagopal. The film stars Mohanlal, alongside Kalabhavan Mani, Samuthirakani, Lalu Alex, Sneha, Ananya, Mythili, Kailash, Jagathy Sreekumar, Lakshmi Gopalaswamy and Suraj Venjaramood in supporting roles. M. Jayachandran composed the songs, while the score was provided by Ouseppachan.

Shikkar was a Ramzan release on 11 September 2010. It received generally positive reviews from critics, with praise for the cinematography and Mohanlal's performance. The film was a box-office success, becoming one of the highest-grossing Malayalam films of the year. Shikkar won the Kerala Film Critics Award for Best Popular Film.

== Plot ==
Balaraman is a former police constable for the Andhra Pradesh Police Department in Hyderabad, who presently works as a lorry driver and finally settles down with his teenage daughter Ganga in Chittazha, a mountainous terrain in Idukki.

However, Balaraman's life takes a turn when he learns that a group of Naxals wants to finish him and Ganga in order to avenge the death of their leader Dr. Syed Abdul Rahman (Sakhavu Abdulla), a Naxalite and a qualified MBBS doctor, who was killed in a staged encounter by the cops. Without any choice, Balaraman decides to take drastic measures to protect Ganga by defeating the Naxals.

== Cast ==
- Mohanlal as C. Balaraman, Lorry driver and ex-CPO of Hyderabad, Andhra Pradesh Police
- Samuthirakani as Dr. Syed Abdul Rahman / Sakhavu Abdulla, a doctor who adheres to Naxalism
- Kalabhavan Mani as Maniyappan, Balaraman's associate
- Lalu Alex as Sathyan, Balaraman's friend
- Sneha as Kaveri, Balaraman's wife and Ganga's mother
- Ananya as Ganga, Balaraman's and Kaveri's daughter
  - Anjali Krishna as young Ganga
- Kailash as Manu, Ganga's love interest
- Thalaivasal Vijay as Muhammad Rawuthar, Ex-CPO of Andhra Pradesh Police
- Jagathy Sreekumar as Pilla alias Mathaayi
- Suraj Venjaramoodu as Barber Kuttappan / Kuttappa Swamy
- Mythili as Gayathri
- Lakshmi Gopalaswamy as Rukmini, Abdulla's wife
- Jain Syriac Babu as a fake deaf and mute worker, Abdulla's and Rukmini's only son
- N. L. Balakrishnan as Jayan, Balaraman's neighbour
- Babu Namboothiri as Fr.Paul
- Reshmi Boban as Ramani Sathyan
- Sreelatha Namboothiri as Eli
- Sadiq as Basheer
- Kochu Preman as Chacko
- Shaju as Dineshan, Jeep Driver
- Sampath Ram as Ravi Shankar, Andhra Pradesh Police
- John Kokken as Thambi
- Besant Ravi as Salim
- Ravi Venkatraman as DYSP Deva Naayak, Andhra Pradesh Police
- Abu Salim as Thodupuzha DYSP Zachariah Mammen
- Mukundhan as Thodupuzha Police Station CI Manoj Kumar
- Appa Haja as Divakaran
- Lal as Dancer Eldho Aashaan (Cameo in song "Sembakame")
- Kani Kusruti as Naxalite
- Fathima Babu as Manu's mother

== Production ==
=== Development ===
The project was initially planned as Balaraman, to be directed by Lal Jose and written by S. Suresh Babu. However, it did not materialize at that time, and later, M. Padmakumar came on board.

=== Filming ===
The film was mainly shot at locations in Pooyamkutty and Kothamangalam in Kerala, Telangana (then part of Andhra Pradesh), and Kodaikanal, Tamil Nadu. The climax scenes were shot in Guna Caves (Devil's Kitchen), and the hills in Kodaikanal. Filming completed in August 2010. The stunt scenes were choreographed by Thyagarajan. Mohanlal and Ananya performed their own stunts in the climax scenes in the caves. Manu Jagadh handled the art direction of the film.

== Soundtrack ==
Shikkar: The Hunt

Soundtrack album by M. Jayachandran
- Released: 10 August 2010
- Recorded: Music Lounge Studios, Chennai
- Genre: Soundtrack
- Label: Satyam Audios
- Producer: M. Jayachandran

M. Jayachandran chronology
Sahasram (2010)	Shikkar: The Hunt (2010)	Khaddama (2011)

All lyrics are written by Gireesh Puthenchery except where noted; all music is composed by M. Jayachandran.

No.	Title	Lyrics	Artist(s)	Length
1.	"Enthedi Enthedi"		Sudeep Kumar, K. S. Chithra	3:54
2.	"Sembakame"		Shankar Mahadevan, Malathy Lakshman	4:22
3.	"Pinne Ennodonnum"		K. J. Yesudas	4:36
4.	"Pratikhatinsu"	Bhuvana Chandra	S. P. Balasubrahmanyam	4:08
5.	"Pinne Pinne"		K. J. Yesudas, Latha Krishna	4:37
6.	"Pada Nayichu"		Biju Narayanan	4:08

== Reception ==
=== Box office ===
The film was a commercial success at the box office. Shikkar released on 9 September in Kerala, Chennai and Bangalore made an extraordinary opening in 110 screens. It grossed ₹5.47 crore (US$570,000) in 8 days from 110 screens, which was phenomenal for a Malayalam film at that time. And took distributor share of around ₹2.10 crore (US$220,000) from 8 days. It was found at the number one position at the Kerala box-office among the Ramzan releases. The film made at a budget of ₹3.5 crore (US$360,000), collected ₹3.75 crore (US$390,000) as distributor share from first two weeks. The New Indian Express called it an "ultimate winner". Shikkar came at second place in the third week. The film collected over ₹12 crore (US$1.2 million) in 20 days.

=== Critics review ===
Shibu B. S of The New Indian Express praised the cinematography of Manoj Pillai and Mohanlal's performance. He commented "The story is as old as the history of revenge sagas. However, scriptwriter has done a commendable job compared with his earlier scripts like Thaandavam, and has tried to inject oodles of energy". Paresh C. Palicha of Rediff.com rated 2/5 stars and said "Suresh Babu's script seems to be heavily inspired by two recent, much-discussed films; Madhupal's Thalappavu and Blessy's Bhramaram. The subject of Naxalism seems borrowed from the former while the edgy-eerie feel has been taken from the latter." and concluded as "Young Padmakumar tried to make Shikkar a mass-entertainer as well as a film with artistic merit; unfortunately, it falls somewhere in between". He appreciated the camera works of Manoj Pillai. Veeyen of Nowrunning.com awarded 2/5 stars and said "There are no directorial flourishes visible in Padmakumar's Shikkar that is old wine in an older bottle. As much as it remains a visual delight, the mysteries that it offers do not much thrill, and the story that it tells seldom excites". he highly praised the cinematography saying, "The real hero of the film is none other than cinematographer Manoj Pillai, the camerawork of the film seems like an adventure in itself".

Sify gave the verdict "very good" and said, "This film is far from being perfect especially in its first half, but it has been packaged quite well. With some superb performances, brilliant visuals, reasonably engaging script and nice music", he gave special mention to Manoj Pillai's camera and Ranjan Abraham's editing and was highly enthusiastic about Mohanlal's performance. Indiaglitz.com reviewer stated "The highlight of the story by Suresh Babu is that even if you may find the story a damn regular after the show, the narrative techniques used and the finesse in keeping the suspense element till the last 30 minutes, succeeds big time". And appreciated cinematography and Mohanlal's performance saying, "The movie remains a visual treat with Manoj Pillai working at his helm, panning over the landscapes and lush green forests with some real adventurous shots. The other highlight naturally remains Mohanlal.

== Accolades ==
Award	Category	Recipient(s)	Result	Ref.
Kerala Film Critics Award	Best Popular Film	K. K. Rajagopal	Won	
J. C. Foundation Award	Best Supporting Actor	Lalu Alex	Won	
J. C. Foundation Award	Best Newcomer	Samuthirakani	Won	
Jaihind TV Film Awards	Best Male Playback Singer	K. J. Yesudas (for "Pinne Ennodonnum")	Won	
Jaihind TV Film Awards	Best Lyricist	Gireesh Puthenchery (posthumous)	Won	
Jaihind TV Film Awards	Special Jury Award	Lalu Alex	Won	
