= Jalam (film) =

- Directed by: M. Padmakumar
- Written by: T. S. Suresh Babu
- Produced by: Sohan Roy; Andrews T D
- Starring: Priyanka Nair; Prakash Bare
- Cinematography: Vinod Illampally
- Edited by: Ranjan Abraham
- Music by: Ouseppachan
- Production companies: Life In Frames Productions and Aries Group
- Distributed by: Aries Group
- Release date: 28 January 2016
- Country: India
- Language: Malayalam

Jalam is a 2016 Malayalam-language movie directed by M. Padmakumar starring Priyanka Nair in the lead role. This is a world's first charity movie, a CSR film by Aries Group directed by M. Padmakumar and produced by Sohan Roy. The dubbed version of the movie was released in Tamil as Kaanal Neer on September 13

== Cast ==
- Priyanka Nair
- Jain Syriac
- Sethulakshmi
- Prakash Bare
- Ponnamma Babu
- P Balachandran
- Hareesh Peradi
