= CBI (film series) =

Film series directed by K. Madhu

CBI Film Franchise
- Directed by: K. Madhu
- Written by: S. N. Swamy
- Produced by: M. Mani (1 - 2); K. Madhu (3 - 4); Swargachitra Appachan (5)
- Starring: Mammootty; Mukesh; Jagathy Sreekumar
- Cinematography: Vipindas (1 - 2); Saloo George (3 - 4); Akhil George (5)
- Edited by: V. P. Krishnan (1 - 2); P. C. Mohanan (3 - 4); A. Sreekar Prasad (5)
- Music by: Shyam (1, 2, 3, 4); Jakes Bejoy (5)
- Production companies: Sunitha Productions (1 - 2); Krishnakripa (3 - 4); Swargachithra Films (5)
- Distributed by: Aroma Movies (1 - 2); Swargachithra Films (3 - 5)
- Release dates: 1988 (1); 1989 (2); 2004 (3); 2005 (4); 2022 (5)
- Country: India
- Language: Malayalam

CBI Film Franchise is an Indian Malayalam-language film series of mystery films directed by K. Madhu and written by S. N. Swamy featuring Mammootty as Sethurama Iyer, a Central Bureau of Investigation (CBI) officer in the title role. The series started off in 1988 with Oru CBI Diary Kurippu. The character Sethurama Iyer is said to have been inspired by a police officer named Radha Vinod Raju, who in 2009 was appointed as the first chief of India's National Investigation Agency.

== Films ==
The films depicts a team of three CBI officers led by Sethurama Iyer investigating a murder case. All the films feature Mammootty as Sethurama Iyer. The other two members of the team vary in the series. All the five films that were released have Vikram, the character played by Jagathy Sreekumar as a CBI officer. But he is not part of the three-man team in the third film and fifth film but appears in the films for a short length. Chacko played by Mukesh appears in the first film but is not part of the team. But Chacko becomes part of the team from the second film onwards. Harry played by Suresh Gopi is present in the first movie as part of the team, but later transferred to Madras in the second sequel.

The films of the franchise are:

Year	Film	Director	Screenwriter	Producer	Composer
1988	Oru CBI Diary Kurippu	K. Madhu	S. N. Swamy	M. Mani	Shyam
1989	Jagratha	K. Madhu	S. N. Swamy	M. Mani	Shyam
2004	Sethurama Iyer CBI	K. Madhu	S. N. Swamy	K. Madhu	Shyam
2005	Nerariyan CBI	K. Madhu	S. N. Swamy	K. Madhu	Shyam
2022	CBI 5: The Brain	K. Madhu	S. N. Swamy	Swargachitra Appachan	Jakes Bejoy

Sethurama Iyer (Malayalam: സേതുരാമയ്യര്‍) is a fictional character and the protagonist of the CBI film series. The character was played by Mammootty in all the films. He is an investigative officer of the Central Bureau of Investigation (CBI). Iyer's popularity is attributed to the fact that he uses his brain rather than brawn to solve cases.
A sixth film in the franchise was announced by the director K. Madhu himself. The writer S. N. Swamy said he is not sure that whether he will be part of the crew.

== Cast and characters ==
Central characters Mammootty, Jagathy and Mukesh as CBI officers.

Character	Oru CBI Diary Kurippu (1988)	Jagratha (1989)	Sethurama Iyer CBI (2004)	Nerariyan CBI (2005)	CBI 5 (2022)
=== Introduced in Oru CBI Diary Kurippu ===
Sethurama Iyer	Mammootty	Mammootty	Mammootty	Mammootty	Mammootty
Vikram	Jagathy Sreekumar	Jagathy Sreekumar	Jagathy Sreekumar	Jagathy Sreekumar	Jagathy Sreekumar
Chacko	Mukesh	Mukesh	Mukesh	Mukesh	Mukesh
CI Harry	Suresh Gopi				
DySP Devadas	Sukumaran	Sukumaran			
K. A. Ouseppachan	Janardhanan	Janardhanan	Janardhanan		
Narayanan	Prathapachandran	Prathapachandran			
Omana	Lissy				
Annie	Urvashi				
John Thomas	Bahadoor				
Joy Mathew	Vijayaraghavan				
SP Prabhakara Varma	Captain Raju				
SP of CBI	Jagannatha Varma	Jagannatha Varma			
C.I Alex	K. P. A. C. Sunny	K. P. A. C. Sunny			
Sunny	Sreenath		Sreenath		
Home Minister Bhargavan	C. I. Paul	C. I. Paul			
Police Surgeon	Kollam Thulasi	Kollam Thulasi			
Padathalam Mathai	Poojappura Ravi				
Mary	Adoor Bhavani		Adoor Bhavani		
Sreedharan	T. P. Madhavan				
Driver Vasu	Kundara Johny				
Nun	Sukumari				
Mohammed	Kothuku Nanappan				
=== Introduced in Jagratha ===
Ashwathy		Parvathy Jayaram			
Babu		Babu Antony			
Adv. Janardanan Nair		Babu Namboothiri			
I.G		K. P. A. C. Azeez			
Vishwam		Devan			
Kumar		K. B. Ganesh Kumar			
Mohan		Jose			
Anchor		Kaithapram Damodaran Namboothiri			
Kurupu		M. S. Thripunithura			
Thomas		Paravoor Bharathan			
Vandana		Sreeja			
Rukmini		Kanakalatha			
Fake policeman		James			
Suryan		Tony			
Rajendrababu		Vishnuprakash			
Hotel boy		Poojappura Radhakrishnan			
Union leader		Adinad Sasi			
=== Introduced in Sethurama Iyer CBI ===
Balagopal			Siddique		
Isow Alex			Kalabhavan Mani		
Ganesh			Vineeth Kumar		
DySP Sathyadas			Sai Kumar		Sai Kumar
Mani			Jagadish		
Rachana			Navya Nair		
Reshmi			Nandana		
Adiyodi			Oduvil Unnikrishnan		
CBI Director			Kalasala Babu		
Bahuleyan			Rajan P. Dev		
Manikunju / Zakariah			Paravoor Ramachandran		
Mosi			Geetha Vijayan		
Krishan Iyer			Kunchan		
Meenakshi Iyer			Urmila Unni		
Dr. Vijayalakshmi			Poornima Anand		
Vijayamma			Kalpana		
Kuzhivetty Mathai			Mala Aravindan		
Fr. Gomez			Bharath Gopi		
Crime branch C.I			Shammi Thilakan		
Sharngadaran			Subair		
Varkey			Punnapra Appachan		
Broker			Suraj Venjaramoodu		
=== Introduced in Nerariyan CBI ===
Kapra Valiya Narayanan				Thilakan	
Mythili				Samvrutha Sunil	
Anitha				Gopika	
Devaswam				Indrans	
George C. Nair				Cochin Haneefa	
DYSP Dhanapalan				Augustine	
ASP Saikumar IPS				Jishnu	
Velu				Mohan Jose	
Dr. Krishnan Nair				P. Sreekumar	
Hariharan				M. R. Gopakumar	
Dr. Krishnan Nair				P. Sreekumar	
Dr. Babu				Rizabawa	
Banjamin C. Nair				Madhu Warrier	
Poopparathy Vasu				Baburaj	
Reshmi				Suja Karthika	
Lakshmiyamma				Bindu Ramakrishnan	
Elizabeth C. Nair				Bindu Panicker	
Mythili's mother				Shobha Mohan	
Anitha's Kin				Ambika Mohan	
Maya				Suvarna Mathew	
=== Introduced in CBI 5 ===
Balagopal, C.B.I. Officer					Renji Panicker
I.G. Unnithan I.P.S					Anoop Menon
Adv. Prathibha Sathyadas					Asha Sarath
Paul Meijo / Mansoor / Sandeep					Soubin Shahir
Vinay, C.B.I. Officer					Ramesh Pisharody
Chief Minister					Dileesh Pothan
SI Iqbal					Sudev Nair
Mamman Varghese, C.B.I. Officer					Edavela Babu
Sudhi, C.B.I. Officer					Alexander Prasanth
Anwar					Ramesh Kottayam
CI Josemon					Jayakrishnan
Dr. George Abraham					Prathap Pothen
Home Minister Abdul Samad					G. Suresh Kumar
Journalist Bhasuran					Chandhu Karamana
D.Y.S.P. Babu Raj					Santhosh Keezhattoor
Susan George / Ambika Unnithan					Kaniha
Anitha, C.B.I. Officer					Ansiba Hassan
Aparna					Malavika Menon
Merlin					Swasika
Anuja					Malvika Nair

== Timeline ==
CBI film series released timeline
1988	Oru CBI Diarykkurippu
1989	Jagratha
1990–2003
2004	Sethurama Iyer CBI
2005	Nerariyan CBI
2006–2021
2022	CBI 5: The Brain
