= Oru CBI Diary Kurippu =

1988 film by K. Madhu

- Poster
- Directed by: K. Madhu
- Written by: S. N. Swamy
- Produced by: M. Mani
- Starring: Mammootty; Suresh Gopi; Jagathy Sreekumar; Mukesh; Sukumaran
- Cinematography: Vipindas
- Edited by: V. P. Krishnan
- Music by: Shyam
- Production company: Sunitha Productions
- Distributed by: Aroma Movies
- Release date: 11 February 1988
- Running time: 137 minutes
- Country: India
- Language: Malayalam
- Budget: ₹ 37 lakhs
- Box office: ₹ 3.5 crores

Oru CBI Diary Kurippu (transl. A CBI diary entry) is a 1988 Indian Malayalam-language mystery thriller film directed by K. Madhu, written by S. N. Swamy, and starring Mammootty, Suresh Gopi, Jagathy Sreekumar, Mukesh, and Sukumaran. The lead character, CBI officer Sethurama Iyer is inspired by a police officer named Radha Vinod Raju, Jammu and Kashmir cadre IPS Officer, who in 2009 was appointed as the first chief of India's National Investigation Agency. It was the highest grossing Malayalam film at that time. Considered one of the best crime thrillers in Malayalam, it eventually developed a cult following. This is the first installment in the CBI film series featuring Mammootty as Sethurama Iyer.

It was produced by M. Mani under the banner of Sunitha Productions. Sequels to the film are Jagratha (1989), Sethurama Iyer CBI (2004), Nerariyan CBI (2005), and CBI 5: The Brain (2022). The film was remade in Telugu as Nyayam Kosam with Rajasekhar and in Hindi as Police Public with Raaj Kumar. Oru CBI Diary Kuripp ran for a whole year (365 days) in Tamil Nadu at a time when Malayalam films did not find much of an audience in the neighbouring states.

== Plot ==
Omana's body is found on the grounds behind her house. It seems that she committed suicide by flinging herself from the roof of the house onto the stone pavement below. The case is being investigated by SP Prabhakara Varma who is an honest police officer. He is assisted by Circle Inspector Alex. The cops interrogate Omana's husband Sunny, her father-in-law Ouseppachan, a local businessman, Ouseppachan's best friend Narayan, household servants, and neighbours. Sunny admits to arguing with Omana the previous night and pushing her onto their bed before leaving to drink but swears he never hit her. He also tells Varma that Omana had attempted suicide before. Ouseppachan claims that he came home from a business trip that night, dropped off by his driver, Vasu, only to find himself locked out of the house. He decided to go around the back to where the cook's quarters were located when he stumbled upon Omana's body. Dissatisfied with inconsistent testimonies from several suspects, the police suspect foul play. However, the Regional Medical Officer reports that Omana died from head trauma at 8:00 P.M.

Omana's cousin, Chacko, a constable, notices Ouseppachan commending one of the servants for something suspicious. He also finds the autopsy report suspicious and tells higher officials Varma and Alex why he has doubts about its accuracy. He informs them that it rained severely until 9:30 P.M. Omana allegedly committed suicide, and if she had died at 8:00 P.M., her corpse would have been wet, and the blood from her injury would have been mixed in with the rainwater. Alex, who is taking bribes from Ouseppachan, warns Ouseppachan to do what he can to get Varma and Chacko off the case. Sensing that Varma will cause him trouble, Ouseppachan implores his best friend, Narayanan, to call his politician friends to have Varma transferred off the case. They also manage to take Omana's cousin, Chacko, off the case as well. Varma gets posted as the rural SP, whereas Chacko gets transferred to the traffic police. A new cop named DYSP Devadas, who is also being bribed by Ouseppachan, takes over the case. He intimidates Omana's grieving family and any witnesses that may implicate Ouseppachan or Sunny. He quickly concludes the investigation by stating that Omana committed suicide.

Omana's father, Thomachan, and her sister, Annie, are determined to seek justice for Omana. They take the case to the CBI with the help of Chacko. The Director of the CBI assigns Sethurama Iyer, the Deputy Superintendent, to head the investigation. He is assisted by CI Harry and SI Vikram. Iyer and his team commence the investigation and find evidence of political interference in the investigation, an increased amount of phone calls to Ministers and Party Leaders from Narayanan's phone number, and ₹1000 rupees worth of cash withdrawals from Ouseppachan's bank that were never reported in the books. Iyer meets with Varma and Chacko who help him with his investigation by informing him of inconsistent testimony from suspects and the inconsistencies with the Regional Medical Examiner's autopsy report. Later, Iyer and his team bring two dummies of the same height and weight as Omana to Ouseppachan's house.

They drop one straight down from the roof, as if it jumped, and throw the other off the roof as if someone had thrown the body. They find that Omana's body landed in approximately the same place as the dummy that was thrown, and concluded that she could not have jumped that far off the roof on her own. They decide to track down Ouseppachan's driver, Vasu, who has been missing since the morning after Omana's death. Harry finds out that Vasu had given some jewelry as collateral for a loan to a local bank. Among the jewelry was a bracelet belonging to Omana. They finally find him, and he confesses that on the night of Omana's death, shortly after he got home after dropping off Ouseppachan, Narayanan came to his house and told him that Sunny had accidentally killed Omana during a domestic dispute. Narayanan and the others implored him to carry Omana's body from her bed to the roof and fling her off. It was during a moment alone with Omana's dead body that Vasu noticed her gold bracelet and decided to steal it, before throwing her corpse off the roof.

Despite Vasu's testimony implicating Sunny as the killer, Iyer is not convinced. Sunny had left the house at 8:00 PM after hitting Omana and that would mean that she died at 8:00 PM. However, Iyer examines photographs of the crime scene and finds that Omana still bled when she was dropped off the roof some 2 hours later, and since dead bodies do not retain heat thus causing the blood to clot, she could not have died at 8 pm. Upon scrutinizing the photographs further, Iyer notices a small bloodstain on Omana's saree below the waist. Since the autopsy report stated that she sustained no injuries below the waist, Iyer is convinced that the blood was left behind by the real killer. The blood test reveals that it is O-negative, a rare blood type. Remembering that the town had imposed mandatory blood tests on all its citizens recently by the local authorities to combat malaria, Iyer goes to the Malaria Research Centre and finds that the blood type was so rare that only three people in the entire town had it.

Iyer arrives at Ouseppachan's house with a large police backup unit and places Ouseppachan under arrest for the murder of Omana. Ouseppachan vehemently denies killing her. Seeing his father being arrested for a crime he committed, a guilt-ridden Sunny confesses to Iyer that he killed Omana accidentally by hitting her too hard when they fought. Iyer tells Sunny that Omana did not die when he hit her, that she only fainted. Iyer then goes on to explain the blood on Omana's saree, which did not match her own, was left behind by the real killer. He informs them that only three people in the entire town are O-negative, and one of those three people is Johny, Ouseppachan's son-in-law. Confronted with evidence for his involvement, Johny confesses that he had come to the house the night Omana had died. Finding her passed out on the bed, he attempted to rape her, but when she woke up and started screaming, he suffocated her to death. In the process, he had accidentally cut himself and left his blood on her saree.

== Cast ==
- Mammootty as Sethurama Iyer, DySP of CBI
- Suresh Gopi as Harry, Inspector of CBI
- Jagathy Sreekumar as Vikram, SI of CBI
- Mukesh as Constable Chacko
- Sukumaran as DYSP Devadas
- Urvashi as Annie John Thomas, Omana's Sister
- Lissy as Omana John Thomas
- Janardhanan as Kilivathuckal Ouseppachan / K. A. Ousepp
- Prathapachandran as Narayanan, Politician and Ouseppachan's Friend
- Bahadoor as John Thomas/Thomachan, Omana's and Annie's Father
- Sreenath as Sunny, Omana's Husband and Ouseppachan's Son
- Vijayaraghavan as Joy Mathew / Johnykutty, Ouseppachan's Son In Law
- Captain Raju as SP Prabhakara Varma IPS
- Jagannatha Varma as SP Isaac Varghese, CBI Director
- K. P. A. C. Sunny as C.I Alex
- C. I. Paul as Home Minister Bhargavan
- Kollam Thulasi as Police Surgeon
- Poojappura Ravi as Padathalam Mathai
- Adoor Bhavani as Mary
- T. P. Madhavan as Sreedharan
- Kundara Johny as Driver Vasu
- Sukumari as Nun
- Kothuku Nanappan as Mohammed
- K. Madhu as Telephone Exchange Officer (Cameo)
- Thomas as Sub Inspector of Police

== Production ==
The lead character, CBI officer Sethurama Iyer, is inspired by a police officer named Radha Vinod Raju, Jammu and Kashmir cadre IPS Officer, who in 2009 was appointed as the first chief of India's National Investigation Agency. Raju's excellence while probing the Polakulam Peethambaran murder case and SI Soman murder case, when he was acting as Superintend of CBI Kochi, attracted the attention of many. Incidentally, Raju was Mammootty's senior in Maharajas College.

Mammootty's Sethurama Iyer was initially conceived as a rough and tough Muslim character, Ali Imran, but Mammootty suggested an Iyer character to incorporate jibes of Devadas (Sukumaran) about vegetarianism and lack of Iyers to do physical work. This resulted in one of the most popular two-character confrontation scenes between Sethurama Iyer (Mammootty) and Devadas (Sukumaran). Due to its popularity, this was repeated in the sequels Jagratha and Sethurama Iyer CBI. The third sequel was released 15 years after Jagratha. By this time, Sukumaran, who had portrayed Devadas, had died. Thus, Sai Kumar was cast as the son of Devadas; he was required to mimic Sukumaran's style of performance. S N Swamy later reused the character of Ali Imran for another script, which became the film Moonam Mura.

The film concentrates on the central investigative story only, without the songs and dances generally associated with Indian commercial films. The plotline of the film was crafted around the real-life Polakkulam Case in which a hotel employee was murdered and dropped from the terrace to make it look like a suicide. It was also the first case where a humanoid dummy experiment was conducted in the state of Kerala to prove the murder.

== Reception ==
CBI diarykurippu was released on February 18, 1988.The film was made on a shoestring budget of only ₹37 Lakhs. Oru CBI Diary Kurippu was the highest grossing Malayalam film at both the Kerala and Tamil Nadu box office at that time. The film was released in 21 centres, completed 50 days in all release centres and 150 days in 3 centres. Movie collected ₹19 Lakhs in 170 days in Trivandrum Dhanya theatre . This was the first movie to complete 50 days in 2 centres in Ernakulam.It collected a total of ₹30,11,186 from 2 centres in Ernakulam. It became the highest grossing Malayalam film at the time collecting around ₹3 crore, beating the previous collection record of the 1987 film New Delhi which collected around ₹2.5 crore (US$270,000) from the Kerala box office. CBI diarykuruppu completed 365 days run in Madras(currently Chennai) Safire theatre and collected ₹54 lakhs which was theatre record that time and overall CBI collected about ₹1 crore from Tamil Nadu box office.

== Remakes ==
The film was remade into Telugu as Nyayam Kosam in 1988, directed by Ravi Raja Pinisetty and starred Rajasekhar. The film was again remade in Hindi as Police Public in 1990 and was directed by Esmayeel Shroff and starred Raaj Kumar as CBI Officer Jagmohan Azaad.

Year	Film	Language
1988	Nyayam Kosam	Telugu
1990	Police Public	Hindi

== Legacy ==
The success of Oru CBI Diary Kurrippu inspired more investigative films in Malayalam, such as Utharam (1989), Ee Kanni Koodi (1989), Ee Thanutha Veluppan Kalathu (1990), and Mukham (1990). It also became the first Malayalam film to complete a 250 days run in Tamil Nadu. The success of the film in Tamil Nadu is indirectly responsible for the success of other Malayalam-language films like Mahayanam (1988), His Highness Abdullah (1990), Iyer the Great (1990), Abhimanyu (1991), and Amaram (1991) in the state. Renu Saran in her book, History of Indian Cinema, called the film a "landmark" and wrote, "It bought to fore a new concept of villainy and a refreshing idea of a hero. Without even a single song or dance number, Oru CBI Diary Kurrippu created box-office history in Kerala."

In February 2018, Neelima Menon of The News Minute wrote, "The first edition of the franchise released in 1988, was a breakthrough film in terms of novelty; as a film in the investigative genre it imbibed from western sensibilities. It was very scientific, systematic and unfussy in format—with new theories like using humanoid dummies to disentangle the crime." In May 2020, she wrote, "K. Madhu set off a new trend of detective movies with Oru CBI Diary Kurippu. Malayalam cinema had ‘CBI’ movies before, with Prem Nazir and Adoor Bhasi playing colleagues in disguise. But the epic Sethurama Iyer series adopted a new approach, building a narrative for you to empathise with the victim while using cinematic elements as punch lines and background music to enliven the solving of the crime. Even as the detective meant strictly business, personalised the story he went after."

Oru CBI Diary Kurippu gave a break for Janardhanan who appeared in a comical role, Ouseppachan, until then, he was known for portraying antagonistic roles. He began appearing in more comedic roles after Oru CBI Diary Kurippu and would be best known for his comedic roles in the later half of his career.
