= Sethurama Iyer =

Fictional character

- CBI series character
- Mammootty as Senior Superintendent Sethurama Iyer of CBI
- First appearance: Oru CBI Diary Kurippu (1988)
- Last appearance: CBI 5: The Brain (2022)
- Created by: S. N. Swamy
- Portrayed by: Mammootty

In-universe information
- Gender: Male
- Occupation: Deputy Superintendent - starting rank (first 2 parts of the series) Senior Superintendent - current rank in The Central Bureau of Investigation
- Religion: Hindu (Iyer)
- Nationality: Indian

Senior Superintendent Sethurama Iyer CBI (alternate spelling Sethuramayyar) is a fictional character, and the main protagonist of the CBI series of investigative thriller films in Malayalam directed by K. Madhu. The character was played by Mammootty in five films so far.

Sethurama Iyer is an investigative officer of the Central Bureau of Investigation (CBI), the Indian equivalent of the Federal Bureau of Investigation. Iyer's popularity is attributed to the fact that he uses his brain rather than brawn to solve cases. The suspense-filled narration of the movies and the novelty of the investigative thriller genre also contributed to its success and becoming a household name among the moviegoers of Kerala. The character was inspired by a police officer named Radhavinod Raju, who in 2009 was appointed as the first chief of India's National Investigation Agency.

== Inspiration ==
The character is said to have been inspired by the police officer Radhavinod Raju, who in 2009 was appointed as the first chief of India's National Investigation Agency. Raju's excellence while probing the Polakulam Peethambaran murder case and SI Soman murder case, when he was acting as SP of CBI Kochi, attracted the attention of many. His "Dummy-to-Dummy" experiment in Polakulam Peethambaran murder case was used in Oru CBI Diary Kurippu. When Oru CBI Diary Kurippu became a hit, Mammootty became more famous in films and Raju in his services. Incidentally, Raju was Mammootty's senior in Maharajas College.

Radhavinod Raju was also associated with the probes into Rajiv Gandhi assassination case and hijacking of Indian Airlines plane to Kandahar. The films Mission 90 Days and Kandahar were respectively inspired by the operations of Raju in these cases.

== Characterisation ==
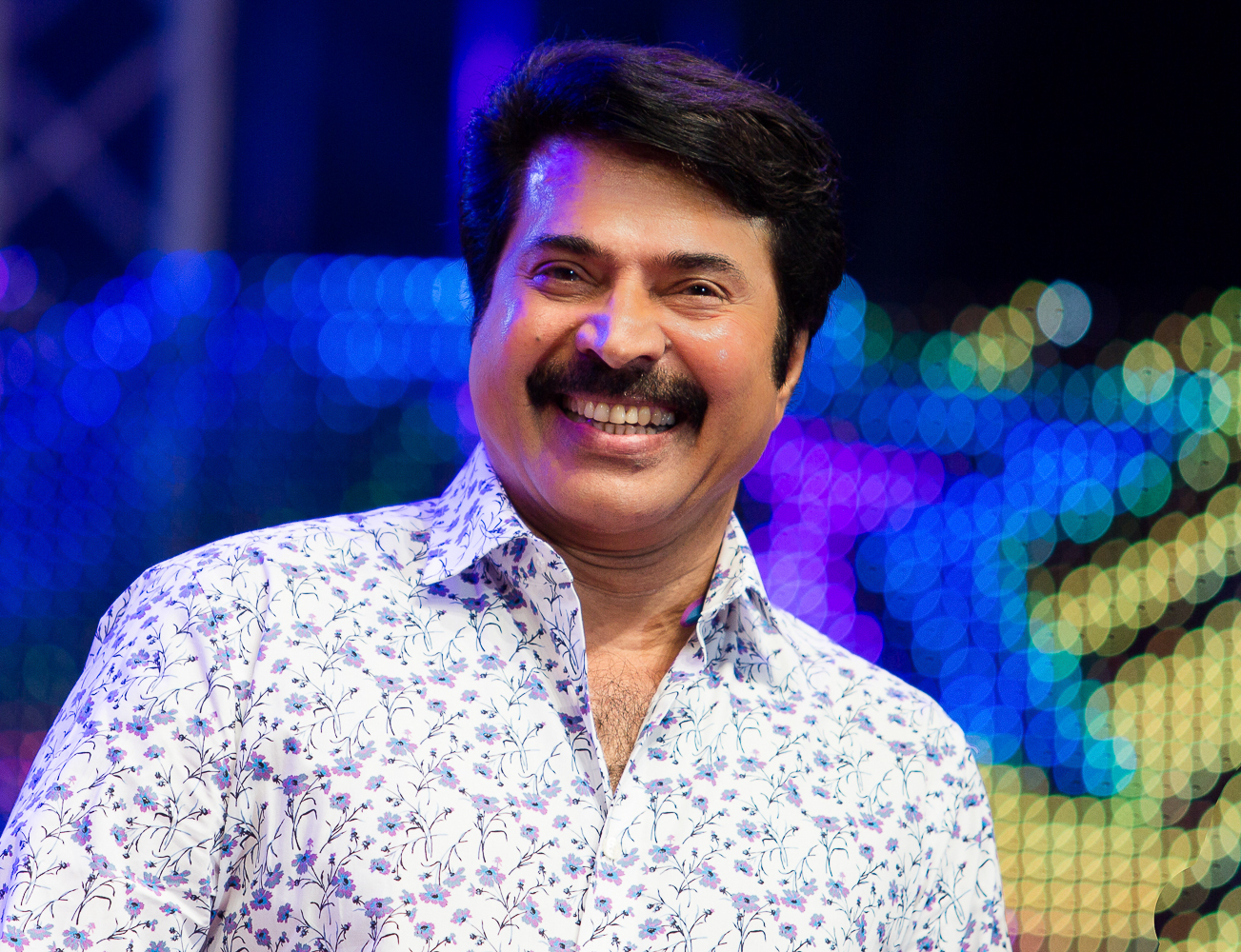
Mammootty, who portrayed Sethurama Iyer in the five films so far

Sethurama Iyer is depicted with a distinctive style in the films. The character is heavily based on Kerala Iyers. Mammootty thus in the series speaks Malayalam with traces of Tamil to represent the fact that the native language of this community is Tamil. The most characteristic mannerism associated with him is his peculiar gait, as he folds both his arms behind his back while walking. He used to scratch his head using forefinger as a gesture while he is in intense conceptualization. In the second movie, Jagratha, he was shown chewing betel, but this was dropped in the later films. He is deceptively calm, rarely raises his voice and walks briskly. His entries and exits in most scenes of the movies are punctuated by the signature background score of the series, composed by Shyam. He is always shown wearing a kumkum stripe on his forehead. He usually wears plain light-coloured half-sleeve shirts and dark plain trousers, without tucking in. He is married, and has a son, who appears in the film Jagratha, though not reappearing later. He is a teetotaler, vegetarian and a God-fearing, devout family man.

Originally K. Madhu, the director of the film series had visualised the protagonist of the first film in the series as a tough cop named Ali Imran. It was Mammootty who convinced him that a pious intelligent Tamil Brahmin would be better.

== Appearances ==
=== CBI film series ===
| Year | Film | Director | Lead Actor | Co-Actors | Screenwriter | Producer | Composer | Installments | Notes |
|---|---|---|---|---|---|---|---|---|---|
| 1988 | Oru CBI Diary Kurippu | K. Madhu | Mammootty | Mukesh and Jagathy Sreekumar | S. N. Swamy | M. Mani | Shyam | First Installment | Original |
| 1989 | Jagratha | K. Madhu | Mammootty | Mukesh and Jagathy Sreekumar | S. N. Swamy | M. Mani | Shyam | Second Installment | Sequel |
| 2004 | Sethurama Iyer CBI | K. Madhu | Mammootty | Mukesh and Jagathy Sreekumar | S. N. Swamy | K. Madhu | Shyam | Third Installment | Sequel |
| 2005 | Nerariyan CBI | K. Madhu | Mammootty | Mukesh and Jagathy Sreekumar | S. N. Swamy | K. Madhu | Shyam | Fourth Installment | Sequel |
| 2022 | CBI 5: The Brain | K. Madhu | Mammootty | Mukesh and Jagathy Sreekumar | S. N. Swamy | Swargachitra Appachan | Jakes Bejoy | Fifth and Final Installment | Sequel |
