= Jagratha =

1989 film by K. Madhu

- Directed by: K. Madhu
- Written by: S. N. Swamy
- Produced by: M. Mani
- Starring: Mammootty; Mukesh; Jagathy Sreekumar
- Cinematography: Vipin Das
- Edited by: V. P. Krishnan
- Music by: Shyam
- Release date: 7 September 1989
- Country: India
- Language: Malayalam

Jagratha: CBI Diary - Part 2 (transl. Caution) is a 1989 Indian Malayalam-language mystery thriller film directed by K. Madhu, starring Mammootty, Mukesh and Jagathy Sreekumar.

It is the second movie in the CBI investigative thrillers series serving as a sequel to Oru CBI Diary Kurippu released in 1988. Mammootty reprises his role as the CBI officer Sethurama Iyer. Three more sequels were produced in the CBI series: Sethurama Iyer CBI (2004), Nerariyan CBI (2005) and CBI 5: The Brain (2022). Jagratha was a commercial success and is considered one of the best investigative thrillers in Malayalam.

== Plot ==
A famous actress named Aswathi was found hanging in a hotel room and is declared dead. DYSP Devadas investigates the case and confirms the cause of death was suicide. However, due to public pressure, the Kerala government is forced to transfer the case to CBI, who assigns Sethurama Iyer to complete the investigation with a short deadline with the help of his two juniors Vikram and Chacko, a former police constable who was taken on deputation to CBI.

During the course of investigation, CBI Sethu discovers that Aswathi, just 5 feet 4 inches tall, could not have reached the height of the ceiling hook to hang herself, even with the assistance of the tallest furniture. Also, the grease stains on the saree used to commit suicide gave the indication that the culprit had used it to pull the body up through the ceiling hook, thus confirming that Aswathi was actually murdered. This leads to apprehending the main suspects.

The first suspect is Viswam, a popular actor who was defamed after Aswathi detailed his extramarital affairs in a popular magazine. The second suspect is a local goon named Babu, who was hired by Viswam to supposedly murder Aswathi. The third suspect is ex-Minister Bhargavan who had molested Ashwathi in the past. And the fourth suspect was Mohan Nair, who is the fiancée of Aswathi as he could not provide an alibi for the night of the murder. Viswam and Babu end up being cleared as it turns out that Aswathi was already dead when Babu broke into her room. This statement further detours the investigation and also becomes a primary turning point in the story. In parallel, it turns out that an anonymous phone call made at night to the hotel where Aswathi stayed on the night of the murder seems to be another red herring in the story.

Upon further investigation, it turns out that the saree used to hang Aswathi was a brand new piece and was purchased from a nearby KSRTC station. The shop owner remembers the person, who was 6 feet tall when he purchased the saree, and also a phone call from a public telephone box at the railway station was used to call both Aswathi's hotel and also to the home of lawyer Janardhanan Nair, who is Mohan's father. Connecting these two together, CBI Sethu arrests Mohan, and Janardhanan challenges that he will disprove the case against Mohan as there is no solid evidence against him. CBI Sethu says he has enough evidence against Mohan to charge him with murder, which finally provoked Janardhanan to confess by accident that Mohan could never have committed the crime as he was not there at the scene. This confession led the CBI to force Janardhanan to reveal how he knows that Mohan wasn't there that night. Janardhanan finally confesses that he was the one murdered Aswathi, and his aide Ramesh (who is 6 feet tall) was involved in it as he purchased the saree to hang her.

It turns out that Janardhanan had an affair with one of his clients Rukmini, who gave birth to Aswathi, which would make both Mohan and Aswathi half-siblings. Since Janardhanan was already married, his relationship with Rukmini was kept a secret. He also opposed the relationship of Aswathi and Mohan, but didn't have the courage to tell them the truth out of fear for social consequences. After his attempts to convince Mohan and Aswathi to separate proved futile, Janardhanan and Ramesh resorted to murder Aswathi. As such, Janardhanan and Ramesh end up being arrested by the police, and the case is now closed.

== Cast ==
- Mammootty as Sethurama Iyer, DYSP of CBI
- Mukesh as Chacko, SI of CBI
- Jagathy Sreekumar as Vikram, Inspector of CBI
- Parvathy Jayaram as Actress Aswathy
- Sukumaran as DYSP Devadas
- Janardhanan as Ouseppachan
- Prathapachandran as Narayanan, Ouseppachan's Friend
- Babu Antony as "Kollante Makan" Babu
- K. P. A. C. Sunny as CI Alex
- Jagannatha Varma as SP, CBI Director
- Babu Namboothiri as Adv. S. Janardhanan Nair
- K. P. A. C. Azeez as I. G. of Police
- C. I. Paul as Ex-Minister Bhargavan
- Devan as Actor Viswam
- K. B. Ganesh Kumar as Journalist Kumar
- Jose as Producer Mohan, Nair's Son
- Sreeja as Vandana
- Kollam Thulasi as Forensic Doctor
- Paravoor Bharathan as Producer Thomas
- M. S. Thripunithura as Editor Kurup
- Aroma Sunilkumar as Movie Director
- Tony as Hotel Receptionist Suryan
- James as Fake Policeman
- Rajan Sankaradi as Fake Policeman
- Kanakalatha as Rugmini
- Kaithapram Damodaran Namboothiri as Anchor at Award Function
- Vishnuprakash as Rajendra Babu, Vandana's Husband and Drama Artist
- Dr. Jayan as Ramesh, Nair's Junior Advocate
- Poojappura Radhakrishnan as Hotel Boy
- Adinad Sasi as Union Leader
- Kochaniyan as SI Simon Thomas
- Suresh Gopi as Harry (Mentioned Only)
- Lissy as Omana (Mentioned Only)
- Sreenath as Sunny (Mentioned Only)
- Vijayaraghavan as Joy Mathew / Johnykutty (Mentioned Only)

== Release ==
The film was released on 7 September 1989.

=== Box office ===
The film was below average.
