= Oohakachavadam =

- Directed by: K. Madhu
- Written by: S. N. Swamy
- Screenplay by: S. N. Swamy
- Produced by: Shobha Anand
- Starring: Balachandra Menon; Lalu Alex; Suhasini; Thiagarajan
- Cinematography: Vipindas
- Edited by: V. P. Krishnan
- Music by: S. P. Venkatesh
- Production company: Anand Movie Makers
- Distributed by: Tharangini Films
- Release date: 9 September 1988
- Country: India
- Language: Malayalam

Oohakachavadam (transl. Guessing trade) is a 1988 Indian Malayalam-language film directed by K. Madhu and written by S. N. Swamy. The film stars Balachandra Menon, Suhasini and Thiagarajan. The film's musical was by S. P. Venkatesh.

== Cast ==
- Balachandra Menon as Alex
- Suhasini as Malathi
- Thiagarajan as Rocky Fernandez
- Lalu Alex as Hassan Koya, Rocky's friend and partner
- Jagathy Sreekumar as Gopi Koothrappally, Malathi's cousin
- Sreenath as Balan, Malathi's brother
- Janardhanan as Deputy Enforcement Director Menon
- Sukumari as nun
- Prathapachandran as Varma
- Jagannatha Varma as Achuthan Marar, Malathi and Balan's father
- K. P. A. C. Sunny as Advocate Jose
- Oduvil Unnikrishnan as Naseema's father and Rocky's father-in-law
- Mammukoya as Abdullah
- Paravoor Bharathan as Iyer
- Amit as Balan's Son and Malathi's nephew
- Adoor Bhasi as Shah
- Unni Mary as Meera, Rocky's girlfriend
- Jose Prakash as Fernandez, Rocky's father
- Kollam Thulasi as Police Officer
- Kothuku Nanappan as Benjamin Thomas, Meera's father
- James as James, Rocky's partner
- Priya as Naseema, Rocky's wife
- Shyama as Amina, Hassan Koya's wife
- Santha Devi as Aishumma
- Poojappura Radhakrishnan as mental patient's brother
- Adinad Sasi as informer
- Dr. Jayan as informer

== Soundtrack ==
The music was composed by M. G. Radhakrishnan.

No.	Song	Singers	Lyrics	Length (m:ss)
1	"Engo Thaazhvarakkattile"	K. S. Chithra	Kala Adoor	
