= 2001 Aluva massacre =

Murder case in India

Aluva massacre
- Date: 6 January 2001
- Location: Aluva, Kerala, India
- Cause: hacked to death
- Motive: revenge
- First reporter: Unnamed person
- Participants: 7
- Outcome: Death of six members in a family
- Deaths: 6
- Arrests: 1
- Suspects: 1
- Accused: Antony Manjooran
- Charges: several including murder
- Trial: February 2005
- Verdict: death penalty (overturned to life imprisonment in 2018)

The Aluva massacre also locally known as Manjooran mass murder took place on 6 January 2001 in the city of Aluva in the state of Kerala, India. All the six family members, including an elderly woman and two children, of the Manjooran house in the city center were murdered. After many investigations, the local police came to the conclusion that Antony, who was a relative of the family and a regular visitor to their house, had committed the murder. The case was later handed over to the CBI, following the protest by the relatives of the victims. In February 2005, the CBI court sentenced Antony to death and in September 2006, the High Court also upheld the death sentence. However, in December 2018, Antony's death sentence was commuted to life imprisonment.

== Murder ==
On 6 January 2001, six members of the Manjooran house located at the railway station road in Aluva were murdered. Augustine, the owner of Manjooran Hardwares, which operated on railway station road, his wife Baby, children Jaymon and Divya, Augustine's mother Clara and sister Kochurani were the victims. Antony Manjooran, a distant relative and family friend of Augustine was the murderer. Antony was offered a job abroad and it required some money. On the night in question, Antony came home to ask for money. At this time only Kochurani and Clara were at home whereas Augustine, his wife and two children had gone to see a movie. Antony asked Kochurani (aged 42) for money and when he did not get it, he hacked her to death. Clara (aged 74), who witnessed this, was also hacked to death. As Augustine Manjooran knew that he was visiting their home, Antony realised that he would get caught, so he hid at the home for the rest of the family to return. 47-year-old Augustine, his 42-year-old wife Baby, 14- and 12-year-old children Jaymon and Divya were then hacked to death by Antony after they returned home.

== Investigation, trial and verdict ==
=== Kerala Police ===
After the murder, the Aluva police station received a call around 11 pm on the next day after the murder. The police found an arrow sign drawn with blood on the wall close to the bodies of Augustine and Baby. Under the supervision of Ernakulam rural superintendent of police M Sethuraghavan, an investigation team consisting of 30 officers was formed. The team after many investigations found that Antony, who was August's relative and a regular visitor to their house was the murderer. Antony was a temporary driver in the municipality. He lived with his family at Aluva Syrian church road. Meanwhile, he got an opportunity to work abroad. Kochurani had promised money for this, but did not pay. The investigating officers concluded that the enmity related to this was the reason for the massacre. Then the crime branch, which conducted an investigation, also confirmed this.

From the post-mortem report, it was understood that all were killed the previous night. From the questioning of the relatives and those in the vicinity, it became clear that Antony had committed the murder. On the night in question, Antony, who had gone to Mumbai from Aluva station, had entered Dammam. Police went to Mumbai and it was found that the gold ornaments worn by the victims were sold by Antony there.

Then the police looked for alternative ways. There is no agreement between India and Saudi Arabia to extradite criminals. The police put Jamma under surveillance to prevent him from talking to Antony Jamma.

The police came to Mumbai and met with Arun Memon, the owner of Cosmos Travel, who had taken Antony to Saudi Arabia. His wife had come to the office in Mumbai requesting him to be brought back, and that he would bear the expenses, the Saudi sponsor send Antony back home. Later, the police caught Antony at the SAHAR airport. The police team reached Karipur airport with Antony. Despite telling many lies, Anthony confessed to the crime when the police produced evidence.

=== Central Bureau of Investigation ===
Some of the relatives of the victims came forward expressing their dissatisfaction with the crime branch investigations. They alleged that there were more accused. Then the case was handed over to the CBI. However, they also eventually reached Antony himself. In February 2005, the CBI special court convicted Antony and sentenced him to death. On 18 September 2006, the High Court upheld the decision of death penalty but on 13 November, the Supreme Court stayed the verdict. In 2009, the death penalty was re-approved. The subsequent revision petition was also dismissed. A mercy plea was given to the President in 2010 to no avail. Then the process to hang Antony was started in Poojappura Jail. During the investigation, the police recovered gold ornaments from the house and the bank locker. Even though the case is over now, the claimants have not bought it back, so it is kept in the court.

== Overturning of verdict ==
In 2014, Chief Justice R.M Lodha's order overturned Antony's verdict. He ordered that the review petitions against the death sentence should be heard in an open court. In 2018, the court commuted Anthony's death sentence to life imprisonment. At this time, Antony had spent 13 years in solitary confinement after being sentenced to death. Later, Poojappura Central Jail authority made three attempts to release him as his prison sentence was completed. But the Aluva police did not file a report in favor of Antony and his attempts for parole since 2018 became unsuccessful. However, in June 2022, the government decided to grant parole to 23 people who have been in jail for many years and were denied parole due to the contrary police report. Antony was included in the list and was granted a 30 days parole.

== In popular culture ==
The setting of the 2004 Malayalam crime thriller film Sethurama Iyer CBI was a massacre in a house. The film's screenwriter S.N Swamy said that there was a little inspiration from it.

== See also ==
- Murder of Chandini
