= Police Public =

- Directed by: Esmayeel Shroff
- Written by: Moin-ud-din
- Based on: Oru CBI Diary Kurippu by S. N. Swamy
- Produced by: Vijay P. Mehta
- Starring: Raaj Kumar; Naseeruddin Shah; Kabir Bedi; Raj Kiran; Poonam Dhillon; Prem Chopra
- Cinematography: Pramod Mital
- Edited by: R. Rajendran
- Music by: Raamlaxman (songs); Louis Banks-Sunil Kaushik (score)
- Production company: Prathima Films
- Release date: 11 May 1990
- Country: India
- Language: Hindi

Police Public is a 1990 Indian Hindi-language crime thriller film, directed by Esmayeel Shroff. The film stars Raaj Kumar, Naseeruddin Shah, Kabir Bedi, Raj Kiran, Poonam Dhillon and Prem Chopra in lead roles. This is a remake of a Malayalam movie Oru CBI Diary Kurippu, which released in 1988.

== Plot ==
Karuna, a young lady, has mysteriously died, and the honest cop Shah Nawaz Khan investigates the case. But the investigation is interrupted by the in-laws of Karuna; they are politically powerful. Shah Nawaz Khan is transferred, and a corrupt cop, Mr. Maha Singh, is assigned for the case. He reported that Karuna committed suicide and closed the file. Karuna's father prayed for a CBI investigation. CBI Officer Jagmohan enters the scene, and while he resolves the case, he finds a different angle of the mystery.

== Cast ==
- Raaj Kumar as CBI Officer Jagmohan Azaad
- Naseeruddin Shah as Senior Inspector Maha Singh Garewal
- Kabir Bedi as Senior Inspector Shah Nawaz Khan
- Raj Kiran as Arun Sharma
- Poonam Dhillon as Karuna Sharma
- Shikha Swaroop as Usha Swaroop - Karuna Sharma's sister
- Arbaaz as Shyam - Usha Swaroop's boyfriend
- Prem Chopra as Kishan Sharma
- Ajit Vachani as Ram Narayan Tiwari
- Harish Patel as Jagmohan's Assistant
- Rakesh Bedi as Lallulal
- Ila Arun as Laxmi
- A. K. Hangal as Ram Swaroop

== Soundtrack ==
The film's music was composed by Raamlaxman. Lyrics were by Asad Bhopali.
"Main Jis Din Bhula Doon Tera Pyar Dil Se" was very popular song

Song	Singer
"Main Jis Din Bhula Doon Tera Pyar" (Picturised on Shikha & Arbaaz)	Lata Mangeshkar, Amit Kumar
"Chataungi Chamche Se"	Asha Bhosle
"Fursat Mili Hai Aa Jao"	Asha Bhosle
"Bichhwa Ne Das Liya"	Asha Bhosle
