= Swargachitra Appachan =

Indian film producer and distributor

- Born: Pinakkatt D. Abraham; Kodanchery, Kozhikode, Kerala, India
- Occupations: Producer; distributor
- Years active: 1986 – present
- Notable work: Godfather; Manichithrathazhu

Pinakkatt D. Abraham, better known as Swargachitra Appachan is an Indian film producer, distributor, and entrepreneur. He is the founder of production and distribution company Swargachitra, best known for producing Godfather.

== Career ==
Among the films produced by him, Manichitrathazhu is considered as one of the best thrillers ever made in India as well as one of the best Malayalam films ever made. Manichitrathazhu was remade after nearly 10 years in various languages, including Kannada (Apthamitra), Tamil and Telugu (dubbed) (Chandramukhi), Bengali (Rajmohol), and Hindi (Bhool Bhulaiyaa), all being commercially successful. Manichitrathazhu was selected as second greatest Indian film through an IBNLive poll.

== Filmography ==
Production

Year	Film	Director	Notes
1986	Poovinnu Puthiya Poonthennal	Fazil	Distributed by Central Pictures
1987	Manivathoorile Aayiram Sivarathrikal	Fazil	Distributed by Ghandhimathi
1989	Ramji Rao Speaking	Siddique-Lal	
1991	Ente Sooryaputhrikku	Fazil	
1991	Godfather	Siddique-Lal	
1992	Vietnam Colony	Siddique-Lal	
1993	Manichitrathazhu	Fazil	
1997	Aniathipravu	Fazil	
2001	Friends	Siddique	Tamil film
2003	Maa Bapu Bommaku Pellanta	Ravi Raja Pinisetty	Telugu film
2004	Vesham	V. M. Vinu	
2007	Azhagiya Tamil Magan	Bharathan	Tamil film
2022	CBI 5	K. Madhu	

Distribution

- In Harihar Nagar
- Pappayude Swantham Appoos
- Godfather
- Vietnam Colony
- Manichitrathazhu
- Manathe Vellitheru
- Kabooliwala
- No. 1 Snehatheeram Bangalore North
- Chandralekha
- Aniathipravu
- Aaram Thampuran
- Ayal Kadha Ezhuthukayanu
- Ustaad
- Narasimham
- Daivathinte Makan
- Raavanaprabhu
- Praja
- Kakkakuyil
- Runway
- Manjupoloru Penkutti
- Sethurama Iyer CBI
- Vellinakshatram
- Nerariyan CBI
- CBI 5

== See also ==
- Navodaya Appachan
