= Kalikkalam =

990 Indian Malayalam-language action thriller film

- Directed by: Sathyan Anthikad
- Written by: S. N. Swamy
- Produced by: George Mathew
- Starring: Mammootty; Murali; Shobana; Sreenivasan
- Cinematography: Vipin Mohan
- Edited by: K. Rajagopal
- Music by: Johnson
- Production company: Central Pictures Productions
- Distributed by: Central Pictures Release
- Release date: 22 June 1990
- Country: India
- Language: Malayalam

Kalikkalam (transl. Playground) is a 1990 Indian Malayalam-language action thriller film, directed by Sathyan Anthikad, starring Mammootty, Shobana and Murali. The film was a major commercial success.

== Plot ==
Mammootty plays a burglar who is known by different names (Shankar / Antony / Tony Louis / Gauthaman / Pappan / Vasudevan / Ramakrishnan) in different places. He is a kind person and uses the illegal money he has burgled to help the poor and orphans.

In the beginning, he fakes himself as an Revenue Intelligence officer Shankar and raids a jewellery with the help of a newly posted honest Police circle inspector Shekharan, and takes the illegal gold along with him. Later, on knowing that he has been cheated, Shekharan sets out to put 'Shankar' behind the bars. He use various methods to trap him, but all go in vain. In between, we could see the good deeds that the burglar does with the stolen money.

In the process, he (Pappan) befriends Jamal, who is a poor chap. 'Pappan' helps Jamal financially too.

Faking as Gauthaman, he busts out a drug group and sends over the drug to Shekhar's office. However, he takes the money involved in that deal himself.

After giving a hint to the police about his next target, 'Ramakrishnan' loots the finance institution (Gopuram) owned by Devassy, where minister Velayil Chandy had deposited his illegal money. Though there was police protection for the institution, 'Ramakrishnan' cleverly executes his plan and escapes with the money.

Tracing the location of the phone calls made, Shekharan traced the residence of 'Shankar' . However, 'Shankar' escapes by a whisker.

C. I. Shekharan's indifference with one of the Abkari contractor cum newspaper publisher Ambalakkadan(Ambalakkadu Krishnan) creates problems, as false news regarding the C. I. and also his family gets published in the newspaper. Shekharan slaps Ambalakkadan for this, which ultimately leads to his suspension.

As Annie takes the romance seriously, 'Tony' finally reveals his actual identity and moves away from her life.

Situations make Shekharan falsely accused as the murderer of Ambalakkadan and Shekharan is sent to jail. At this stage, only 'Shankar' can help Shekharan to prove his innocence as the former was witness to the murder. 'Shankar' unveils the actual murderers then confesses his crimes at the court and surrenders. Shekharan gets released.

== Cast ==
- Mammootty as (Shankar / Antony / Tony Louis / Gauthaman / Pappan / Vasudevan / Ramakrishnan), A Burglar with several names
- Murali as CI Shekharan, sincere police officer
- Shobana as Annie
- Sreenivasan as Jamal
- Lalu Alex as Commissioner Mathews
- C. I. Paul as Ambalakkadu Krishnan
- Mamukkoya as Unni Nair, police constable
- Sukumari as Jamal's Mother
- Innocent as Velayil Chandy
- Chitra as Ramani
- Philomina as Janakiamma
- Oduvil Unnikrishnan as Devassy
- Sankaradi as Ammavan
- T. P. Madhavan as Thomas, Jewellery store owner
- Bheeman Raghu as Jose
- Santhakumari as Rosie, Devassy's wife
- Azeez as Annie's father
- Karamana Janardhanan Nair as Advocate Aravindan
- Thesni Khan as Suhra
- Shari as Meera Nair
- Paravoor Bharathan as Krishnettan
- P. C. George as Ravi
- James as George
- Kaladi Jayan as P. C. Bhaskar

== Production ==
Swamy developed the story with some subtexts from Kayamkulam Kochunni and Robin Hood. Sathyan Anthikad had liked Adikkurippu (1989) and its main character, Bhaskara Pillai and asked Swamy to develop a character like that of Adv. Bhaskara Pillai from Adikkurippu.

== Soundtrack ==
Music was composed by Johnson. Lyrics were written by Kaithapram.

S.No	Song title	Singers
1	"Poothaalam" (male)"	G. Venugopal
2	"Poothaalam" (female)"	K. S. Chithra
3	"Aakaashagopuram"	G. Venugopal

== Reception ==
N.Krishnaswamy of The Indian Express, in a February 22, 1991 review, wrote that the film is "assured of theatrical outlets, and can afford to be what it is, and all that".
