= Vipindas =

Indian cinematographer and director (1938–2011)

- Born: 1938; Pazhayannur, Kerala, India
- Died: 12 February 2011 (aged 72–73); Wayanad, Kerala, India
- Occupations: Cinematographer; film director

Vipindas (1938 – 12 February 2011) was an Indian cinematographer and director. He served as the cinematographer for more than 200 films in Malayalam alone, and directed a couple of films.

== Biography ==
Vipindas was born in 1938 in Pazhayannur, Thrissur, Kerala, as the son of Pallippatta Sankaran Nair and Lakshmi Amma. At the age of 15, he went to Madras (now Chennai) to study photography. He had no formal education in photography but was able to assist veteran Bollywood cinematographer Beevashom for three years. Vipindas started his film career with the Tamil film Thalattu, which he also directed. He debuted in Malayalam through Prethangalude Thazhvara by P.Venu. It was followed by Prathidhwani, directed by him but filmed by veteran director I. V. Sasi. This film established the successful collaboration of Sasi and Vipindas. He worked as a cinematographer with Sasi in about twenty five films. He also collaborated with several directors including P. A. Backer, Fazil, Hariharan, Joshiy, K. Madhu, Padmarajan and Bharathan. His last work was Thathwamasi, directed by Sunil. He died on 12 February 2011.

== Selected filmography ==
- Prethangalude Thaazhvara
- Prathidhwani
- Manimuzhakkam (Winner, Kerala State Film Award for Best Photography)
- Kabani Nadi Chuvannappol
- Avalude Ravukal
- Moonnam Mura
- Oru CBI Diary Kurippu
- Thuramukham
- Nirakkoottu
- Irupatham Noottandu
- Chillu
- Purappadu
- Adhipan
- Jagratha
- Oru Kochu Swapnam
- Thathwamasi
- Adayalam
- Randam Varavu
- Mounam Sammadham
- Aankiliyude Tharattu
- Oru Sindoora Pottinte Ormaykku
- Ee Kaikalil
- Adukkan Entheluppam
- Iniyum Kurukshethram
- Ente Kanakkuyil
- Azhiyatha Bandhangal
- Kaiyum Thalayum Purathidaruthu
- Piriyilla Naam
- Belt Mathai
- Changatham
- Ponmudy
- Oridathoru Phayalwan
- Kallan Pavithran (1981)
- Parvathi
- Oru Kochu Swapnam (Directed)
- Prathidhawani (Directed)

== Awards ==
Vipin Das won the Kerala state award for best black & white cinematography for Choondakkari, Manimuzhakkam, and Aalinganam.
