= Ee Kaikalil =

1986 Indian film

- Poster designed by Gayathri Ashokan
- Directed by: K. Madhu
- Produced by: Prem Prakash
- Starring: Mammootty; Ratheesh; Seema; Shobhana
- Cinematography: vipin das
- Edited by: G. Venkateswaran
- Music by: Johnson; A. J. Joseph
- Production company: prekshaka
- Distributed by: dinni film relies
- Release date: 2 October 1986
- Country: India
- Language: Malayalam

Ee Kaikalil (transl. In these hands) is a 1986 Indian Malayalam-language film, directed by K. Madhu and produced by Prem Prakash. The film is a remake of the 1974 Hindi film Majboor. The film stars Mammootty, Seema, Shobhana and Ratheesh. The film has musical score by Johnson and A. J. Joseph. It was a commercial failure.

== Cast ==
- Mammootty as Sultan Abdul Razak
- Ratheesh as Jayadevan
- Janardanan as Madhava Menon
- Thilakan as Ummachan
- Prem Prakash as Police Officer
- Kunchan as Khadir
- Innocent as Ittoopp
- Seema as Saritha
- Shobhana as Viji Balakrishnan
- Sukumari

== Soundtrack ==
The music was composed by A. J. Joseph and the lyrics were written by K. Jayakumar.

| No. | Song | Singers | Lyrics | Length (m:ss) |
|---|---|---|---|---|
| 1 | "Kaarunyakkathir Veeshi" | K. J. Yesudas | K. Jayakumar | |
| 2 | "Kuliralayil" | K. S. Chithra | K. Jayakumar | |
