= Nariman (film) =

2001 film by K. Madhu

- Poster
- Directed by: K. Madhu
- Written by: S. N. Swamy
- Produced by: A. Rajan
- Starring: Suresh Gopi; Siddique; Samyuktha Varma; Jagadish
- Cinematography: Anandakuttan
- Edited by: P. C. Mohan
- Music by: Score: Rajamani; Songs: M. G. Radhakrishnan
- Production company: Vrindavan Pictures
- Distributed by: Vrindavan Release
- Release date: 1 June 2001
- Running time: 165 minutes
- Country: India
- Language: Malayalam

Nariman is a 2001 Indian Malayalam-language investigative film directed by K. Madhu and written by S. N. Swamy. It stars Suresh Gopi in the title role, with Siddique, Jagadish, Samyuktha Varma, Sadiq, Vijayakumar, Janardhanan, Jagathy Sreekumar, Spadikam George, N. F. Varghese and Rajan P. Dev in supporting roles. The plot follows Ashok Nariman, a Crime Branch DySP who is assigned to re-investigate the "couple murder case" and then to investigate the "Ammini missing case". The film was dubbed in Hindi as Farz Ki Pukaar and in Telugu as Senathipathi.

== Plot ==
Manu, the accused in the notorious couple murder case, attempts an escape during his prison transfer but ends up being shot. Although severely wounded, he survives despite being showered with bullets by the police. Dr. Giri, a senior surgeon, latter, in an attempted rape. For various reasons, Dr. Giri believes Manu to be innocent. He convinces his friend Shekharan, the Chief Minister of Kerala, to reopen the case and assign the case to a sincere and brilliant, yet aggressive, police officer, Ashok Nariman.

Initially termed "hopeless" by the legal advisors — due to the excellent way the case was framed — Nariman found loopholes. He learns that the crime was committed by the intelligent Adv. Padhmanabhan Thampi and his friends Kochunarayanan, Superintendent of Police (SP) Philippose, and their allies, including Musthafa Kamal (a.k.a. Karate Kamal), who executed the crime. Nariman submits his report, and the case comes to the Sessions Court. To everyone's dismay, the Judge refuses to have a second hearing of the case, as earlier the case had gone up to the Supreme Court, awarding capital punishment, and even the President of India did not have any pity on the "perpetrator" Manu, so as to pardon his sentence. The Judge believes the case to be a publicity stunt as a result of the change in Government, and the Court cannot be deceived by any.

Disappointed at the happenings, Nariman takes on a new case — the Ammini missing case. Ammini was an ally, a prostitute, a pimp, and an outlet for the illegal liquor dealings of Kochunarayanan. Lately, she had a change of mind, to retreat from her wrong way of life, to be with her daughter, who hated Ammini's activities. This provoked Adv. Thampi, as she knew many of their secrets, even to an extent more than they know of each other. He even had a suspicion of her being the reason for the police storming the secret hideout of Kamal. Nariman reports the four guilty of murder, and the case reaches the same Sessions Court. The four were found to be guilty by the Court, even with an experienced senior lawyer (Adv. Vaikuntam appeared for them against the inexperienced public prosecutor, Adv. Sethulekshmi, the love interest of Nariman.

While the Judge reads his judgement, Nariman — to everyone's surprise — interrupts the Judge to say the four are innocent. He presents Ammini, the very same Ammini that the Court declared dead. He confesses to his act on how the four became 'culprits' and how the case was framed using strong, but fake evidence (as in the couple murder case) that not even an experienced lawyer could expose. If an average police officer could easily deceive the Court, what would happen if an evil genius with a group of powerful allies sets out on a rampage? If the Court, where common people seek justice, fails to stop them, then there would be a state of anarchy where people won't hesitate to act worse. Through his drama, he pleads justice for Manu.

Although initially furious with his actions, the Judge realizes that the Court can be deceived at times and allows for a second hearing in Manu's case. Through the proceedings months after, Manu is found innocent by the Court and the guilty quadruplet — Adv. Thampi, Kochunarayanan, Philipose, and Kamal — get their punishment.

== Cast ==
- Suresh Gopi as DYSP Ashok Nariman IPS
- Siddique as Adv. Padmanabhan Thampi
- Samyuktha Varma as Adv. Sethulakshmi
- Jagadish as CI Gopi Pillai
- Jagathy Sreekumar as Kochu Narayanan
- Sadiq as SI Chandradas
- Vijayakumar as Manu
- Janardhanan as Chief Minister Shekharan
- Spadikam George as SP Thomas Philipose IPS
- Nithya Das as Sruthi, Manu's lover
- N. F. Varghese as Dr. Giri
- Rajan P. Dev as Adv. Vaikuntam
- Bheeman Raghu as Musthafa Kamal aka Karate Kamal
- Baburaj as Ajayan
- K. P. A. C. Lalitha as Lalitha, Nariman's mother
- Kaviyoor Renuka as Ramani, Ravikumar & Manu's mother
- Anju as 'Cover' Ammini
- Ashokan as Ravikumar, Manu's brother
- Augustine as CI Joseph
- Kalabhavan Mani as thief (Cameo)
- Maniyanpilla Raju as Moideen / Alibhai
- T. P. Madhavan as DGP Akhilesh Avasthi IPS
- E. A. Rajendran as CI Rasheed, Philipose's right hand man
- Bindu Panicker as MLA Nandini
- Salim Kumar as Balan, Kochu Narayanan's manager
- Devi Chandana as Ammini's daughter
- Kozhikode Narayanan Nair as Judge
- Poojappura Ravi as Police Constable Sathyan
- Kochu Preman as Omanakuttan, MLA's husband
- Narayanankutty as Muthu
- Paravoor Ramachandran as Kuruvila
- Ajayan Adoor as Anwar
- Pradeep Prabhakar as Chief Minister's PA
- Motta Rajendran as Goonda

== Soundtrack ==
- Pathiye Pathiye Padivathilil...

Music : M.G.Radhakrishnan Lyrics: Shibu Chakravarthy Sung by M.G. Sreekumar
