= Oru Abhibhashakante Case Diary =

- Poster
- Directed by: K. Madhu
- Written by: S. N. Swamy
- Produced by: Manjalamkuzhi Ali
- Starring: Mammootty; Vijayaraghavan; Rajan P. Dev; Jagathy Sreekumar; Heera Rajagopal; Maathu
- Cinematography: Rasheed Mooppan
- Edited by: V. P. Krishnan
- Music by: Songs: Raveendran; Score: Rajamani
- Release date: 1995
- Country: India
- Language: Malayalam

Oru Abhibhashakante Case Diary (transl. The Case Diary of a Lawyer) is a 1995 Indian Malayalam-language mystery legal drama film directed by K. Madhu and written by S. N. Swamy.The film stars Mammootty, Heera Rajagopal, Jagathy Sreekumar, Vijayaraghavan, Rajan P. Dev and Narendra Prasad. The plot is about a lawyer, seeking justice for an innocent man accused of raping and murdering a teenage girl. The film has soundtrack composed by Raveendran while the background music is scored by Rajamani.

== Plot ==
A young servant girl is raped, murdered and her body is dumped in a pond. The police accuse Unni Thampuran of murder and arrest him. Following torture methods, a confession is extracted from Unni Thamburan and the case is ready to be presented at the court.

Aniyan Kuruvilla, the public prosecutor, discovers flaws in the investigation and declines to fight. Convinced about Unni Thampuran's innocence, he switches sides and decides to fight for him. The prosecution hires a bent and a crooked lawyer Jagatheesh T. Nambiar and through a barrage of false witnesses and doctored testimonies, Unni Thampuran is found guilty and sentenced to life imprisonment.

Aniyan Kuruvilla, though beaten, doesn't lose hope and starts a private investigation of his own and discovers that a group of spoilt boys, Reji and his friends are responsible for the brutal murder. Incidentally, they also meet another woman who was raped by the trio. Reji is the son of a very powerful and influential woman, Accama.

Aniyan Kuruvilla reopens the case in court. Nambiar asks the court to dismiss the reopening as such move is very rare. He produces proof that the accused were in Palakkad attending a wedding and couldn't reach the spot of rape on the time as mentioned in the case file. Aniyan Kuruvila successfully proves the alibi as forged and thus helps to serve justice.

== Cast ==
- Mammootty as Adv. Kuruvila Aniyan Kuruvila / Aniyan Kunju
- Jagathy Sreekumar as Mani Kunju / Mani Kuruvila, Aniyan Kuruvila's Brother
- Heera Rajagopal as Indu
- Vijayaraghavan as SI Balan
- Maniyanpilla Raju as Unni Thampuran, Indu's Brother
- Rajan P. Dev as SP Sugunapalan
- Narendra Prasad as Adv. Jagadish T. Nambiar
- Oduvil Unnikrishnan as Adv. Ramavarma Thampuran, Unni and Indu's Uncle
- Kaveri as Seetha
- Maathu as Shalini
- V. K. Sreeraman as CI Rajan
- Sadiq as DYSP Wilson
- Madhupal as Reji
- Mala Aravindan as Kuttan, Aniyan Kuruvila's Driver and Helper
- Augustine as Bahuleyan
- Adoor Bhavani as Annamma and Deenamma (Double Role)
- P. C. George as Ittichan
- Bindu Panicker as Bindu, Shalini's Sister
- T. P. Madhavan as Pothuval
- T. S. Krishnan as Shaji, Reji's Friend
- Ravi Menon as Mathukutty
- Asha Sachdev as Akkamma, Reji's Mother
- Santhosh as Chacko, Akkamma's Assistant and Henchman
- Kozhikode Narayanan Nair
- Santha Devi as Naniyamma
- Vikraman Nair as Judge
- Pavithran as Fancy Shop Owner
- Dr. Jayan as SI Sabu
- Thrissur Elsy as Seetha's Mother
- Vinod Kozhikode as Akkamma's Assistant and Henchman

== Soundtrack ==
Oru Abhibhashakante Case Diary: Original Motion Picture Soundtrack

Soundtrack album to Oru Abhibhashakante Case Diary by Raveendran
- Released: 13 April 1995 (India)
- Recorded: 1995
- Venue: Cochin
- Studio: Prasad Dubbing Theatre
- Genre: Feature film soundtrack
- Length: 8:05
- Language: Malayalam
- Label: T-Series
- Producer: Raveendran

Raveendran chronology
Mazhayethum Munpe (1995)	Oru Abhibhashakante Case Diary: Original Motion Picture Soundtrack (1995)	April 19 (film) (1996)
External audio
- Audio Jukebox on YouTube

Singles from Oru Abhibhashakante Case Diary
- 1. "Kanikkonnakal" Released: 13 April 1995; 2. "Mazhapeythu Maanam" Released: 13 April 1995

The soundtrack was composed by Raveendran Master whilst the original background music is scored by Rajamani.It features two tracks which were sung by Dr. K. J. Yesudas and Sujatha Mohan. Both of the songs were written by Shibu Chakravarthy.

Track listing
No.	Title	Lyrics	Singer(s)	Length
1.	"Kanikkonnakal"	Shibu Chakravarthy	Sujatha Mohan	04:11
2.	"Mazhapeythu Maanam"	Shibu Chakravarthy	K. J. Yesudas	03:54
Total length:				08:05

=== Reception ===
The song "Kanikkonnakal" received mostly positive reviews and became one of the popular hits in the 90s.
