= Irupatham Noottandu =

- Theatrical release poster
- Directed by: K. Madhu
- Written by: S. N. Swamy
- Produced by: M. Mani
- Starring: Mohanlal; Suresh Gopi; Ambika
- Cinematography: Vipindas
- Edited by: V. P. Krishnan
- Music by: Shyam
- Production company: Sunitha Productions
- Distributed by: Aaroma Release
- Release date: 14 May 1987
- Running time: 150 minutes
- Country: India
- Language: Malayalam
- Box office: ₹2.5 crore

Irupatham Noottandu (transl. Twentieth Century) is a 1987 Indian Malayalam-language crime thriller film directed by K. Madhu, written by S. N. Swamy and produced by M. Mani. It stars Mohanlal, Suresh Gopi, and Ambika. The film's music was composed by Shyam. In the film, Sagar alias Jacky, a maverick youth, runs a gold smuggling racket with Sekharankutty, the son of the Chief Minister Inchakadu Ramakrishna Pillai. Jacky and Sekharankutty's relationship stains after Sekharankutty brings narcotics into the business.

Irupatham Noottandu was released on 14 May 1987 and enjoys a cult following in Malayalam cinema.ref name=IT /> It was remade in Kannada as Jackey (1989) and in Telugu as 20va Sathabdam (1990). Ambareesh and Suman reprised Mohanlal's role in the Kannada and Telugu versions, respectively while Devaraj portrayed Suresh Gopi's role in both versions. A spin-off titled Sagar Alias Jacky Reloaded was released in 2009.

== Plot ==
Sagar alias "Jacky", a maverick youth, turns to gold smuggling due to his financial situation and inspiration from the media glorifying the Bombay underworld. He is partnered with Shekharankutty, the son of the ruling Chief Minister Inchakadu Ramakrishna Pillai. The Custom officers are provided with an information about one of the cars among the rally race cars, a blue Maruti car is being used in gold smuggling. Suddenly, the car sways from the pack, where Jacky and his aide Lawrence hide the gold in the car's spare wheel. They pass the customs checking and reach Shekharankutty's house. Jacky, Shekkarankutty and their aides; Qasim, Tony and Chanakya relaxes in a room at Chanakya's hotel.

Qasim and Tony are about to smuggle the gold tonight. Shekarankutty warns Qasim that there is a traitor among them. Unfortunately, Qasim turns out to be the traitor, who escapes with the gold after killing Tony. He is then caught by Jacky and is drowned to death. The next day, Qasim's body is recovered by the police and Chanakya is sent to investigate, where he meets Ashwathy, a reporter for a news magazine investigating the connection between politics and crime in Kerala. At the scene, Ashwathy meets Jeevan, the current investigating officer. Jacky visits Kayikka, a fellow smuggler and reveals that they killed Qasim. Kayikka reveals that his eldest son Shahul has turned to selling weed.

Jacky turns him away for the better and sees Janakiyamma, who is the mother of his love interest Jyothi. Jyothi is actually in prison for murder. Ashwathy is drawn to Jacky's life and tries to get his attention by releasing an article stating that the CM is connected with Jacky. With his influence, Sekkarankutty bails others and learns that Jacky had informed the police. Pillai demolishes Jyothi's place, but Jacky threatens him and demands to build those houses. Shekarankutty is enraged, where he kills Lawrence and hits the car which had Jacky and his mother. Jacky's mother dies and Pillai asks Shekharankutty to leave for Dubai with full police protection, but Jacky finds a way to sneak into the airport disguised as a pilot, where he chases Shekharankutty and kills him. Jacky gets arrested and imprisoned on the day of Jyothi's release.

== Cast ==
- Mohanlal as Sagar Alias Jacky
- Suresh Gopi as Shekharankutty
- Ambika as Aswathy Varma
- Santhosh as Lawrence, Sagar's partner and friend
- Prathapachandran as Chief Minister Inchakattu Ramakrishna Pillai, Shekarankutty's father
- Urvashi as Jyothi, Sagar's ex-lover
- Jagathy Sreekumar as Chanakyan, Sagar, Shekarankutty and Lawrence's friend
- Sreenath as ASP Jeevan IPS
- Janardhanan as IG Issac Thomas IPS
- Kaviyoor Ponnamma as Meenakshiyamma, Sagar's mother
- Sukumari as Janakiyamma, Jyothi's mother
- Adoor Bhasi as Varma, Aswathy's grandfather
- T. P. Madhavan as CI Pothen, Sagar's ally
- K. P. A. C. Sunny as Koshy Ninan, Shekharankutty's family friend and business partner
- Jagadish as Balakrishnan, Aswathy's assistant and press photographer
- Mamukkoya as Kayikka
- Jagannatha Varma as Opposition Leader Pillai
- Jose as Santhosh, customs officer and Jeevan's brother
- Kollam Thulasi as police officer
- Vishnuprakash as George
- Tony as Excise Minister Sethu
- Kothuku Nanappan as Adv. Rajagopalan
- Kollam Ajith as Kasim
- Dr. Jayan as Johny

== Production ==
Writer S. N. Swamy got the idea for the film from a photograph featured in an English-language Sunday magazine published from Calcutta. Swami recalled in an interview that it was the time when mafia bosses had a glorified image in the country after the national emergency period in India (1975–1977). That was the time when public began to learn about Bombay-based mafia leaders such as Haji Mastan, Yusuf Patel, Varadarajan Mudaliar among others. The magazine had an article on Mastan and a photograph featuring much respected actor Dilip Kumar and his wife Saira Banu touching Mastan's feet for giving pranāma. It was shocking for Swami, he never imagined a mafia leader would be respected as such. It inspired the plot for Irupatham Noottandu and the character Sagar Alias Jacky. The lengthy climax of the film was shot in a single day. Vipindas was the cinematographer.

== Soundtrack ==
The music was composed by Shyam and the lyrics were written by Chunakkara Ramankutty.

No.	Title	Lyrics	Singer(s)	Length
1.	"Ambarappoo Veedhiyilu"	Chunakkara Ramankutty	K. J. Yesudas

== Box office ==
The film was released on May 14, 1987, and grossed ₹2.5 crore with a distributor share of ₹1 crore.

== Sequel ==
The character Sagar/Jacky was introduced again in Sagar Alias Jacky Reloaded directed by Amal Neerad which was released on 26 March 2009. Only the character was adapted, but not a sequel to Irupatham Noottandu.
