= Sagar Alias Jacky Reloaded =

2009 film by Amal Neerad

- Theatrical release poster
- Directed by: Amal Neerad
- Written by: S. N. Swamy
- Produced by: Antony Perumbavoor
- Starring: Mohanlal; Suman; Shobana; Bhavana
- Cinematography: Amal Neerad
- Edited by: Vivek Harshan
- Music by: Gopi Sundar
- Production company: Aashirvad Cinemas
- Distributed by: Maxlab Cinemas and Entertainments
- Release date: 26 March 2009 (India)
- Running time: 140 minutes
- Country: India
- Language: Malayalam

Sagar Alias Jacky Reloaded is a 2009 Indian Malayalam language gangster film directed by Amal Neerad. It is a spiritual spin-off of the 1987 film Irupatham Noottandu. The film was written by S. N. Swamy and produced by Antony Perumbavoor under the company Aashirvad Cinemas. The film stars Mohanlal in the title role, with an ensemble cast of Suman, Shobana, Bhavana, Sampath Raj, Manoj K. Jayan, Jagathy Sreekumar, Rahul Dev, Nedumudi Venu, K. B. Ganesh Kumar, Vinayakan, Shereveer Vakil, Sumeet Naval, Sona Nair, V.K Sreeraman, Jinu Joseph and Bala in other pivotal roles.

Sagar Alias Jacky Reloaded released on 26 March 2009 and mainly received mixed reviews from critics and audience with praise towards its direction, music and cast performances, but criticism directed towards its pace and writing. The film was commercial success. The film won the Kerala State Film Award for Best Choreography for Dinesh Kumar.

== Plot ==
Sagar Alias Jacky is a powerful international crime boss, who is famous for solving problems among big criminal organisations and smuggling diamonds. The CM Chandrashekharan's son-in-law Manu is kidnapped and the cops are unable to find a clue. Manu's wife Indu realises that the police have been influenced by her brother Hari who seems to know the kidnappers. Indu decides to call her best friend Jacky to help find Manu. Jacky calls his henchmen all over Kerala for the job, where the gang travels to Goa where Jacky's contact Ferad tells him that the kidnappers are the Rosario brothers Michael "Big B" Rosario and David Rosario, who run the most powerful crime syndicate. Ferad also mentions that Manu is an active participant in gambling and ended up getting taken after a failed promise to the Rosarios, thereby losing their money. After considerable difficulties, Jacky and his gang locate the night club where Manu is held hostage and helps him to escape. Sagar, conscious of Manu's history, advices him to change ways.

This audacity does not sit well with the Rosarios who swear vengeance against Jacky. They kidnap one of Jacky's favourite gangsters and demand ransom. Jacky responds by kidnapping two of the three Rosario brothers and demands that his man be released. Realising that they would never be able to defeat Jacky in a heads-on battle, the Rosario brothers make a deal with Manu and Hari to deliver Sagar's current location, much to Sagar's anger. The Rosarios then try to assassinate Jacky, but to no avail. Frustrated with repeated defeats, the Rosarios approach Jacky's former crime partner Nanthakrishna Naina, who supplies them Sheikh Imran, an internationally infamous assassin.

Feeling guilty of his actions and endangering Sagar's friendship, Manu seeks redemption but gets assassinated by Imran, in front of Indu. Jacky gets framed for the murder, but the Rosarios's plan backfires as Indu provides witness that Jacky was not responsible for her husband's murder. Imran is then asked to assassinate Jacky, where he manages to kill Jacky's bodyguard, but Jacky escapes, hunting down Imran and killing him. The Rosarios kidnaps Jacky's girlfriend Arathi, a news reporter and kills her. Jacky is asked to arrive at a place to work out a deal. When Jacky reaches there, he finds Arathi dead. Enraged, Jacky goes to the Rosarios' club and goes on a killing spree, where he later leaves to Dubai where Naina is hiding on a yacht. With the help of his bodyguard, Jacky plants explosives on the yacht which kills Naina. Jacky informs Indu that Manu's death has been avenged.

== Cast ==
- Mohanlal as Sagar Alias Jacky, a powerful crime boss and leader of a crime syndicate
- Suman as Nanthakrishna Naina, an international drug lord
- Shobana as Indu, Manu's wife
- Bhavana as Arati Menon
- Sampath Raj as Michael "Big B" Rosario, an infamous drug dealer in Goa
- Manoj K Jayan as Manu, Jacky's friend
- Jinu Joseph as Ferad, Jacky's Right hand
- Jagathy Sreekumar as Ashok Kumar, Jacky's Right hand
- Nedumudi Venu as CM Chandrashekharan
- K. B. Ganesh Kumar as Hari, CM Chandrashekhran's son
- Bala as SP Hamid
- Shereveer Vakil as David Rosario, Michael Rosario's brother
- Sona Nair as Deepa, Hari's wife
- V. K. Sreeraman as Home Minister
- Rahul Dev as Sheikh Imran, an international assassin, hired by Naina
- Vinayakan as Style, Jacky's ally
- Anu Anand as Joseph, Jacky's ally
- Sumeet Naval as Azar, Jacky's ally
- Prayaga Martin as Amina, Azar's sister
- Vanitha Krishnachandran as Azar's mother
- Sudhi Koppa as Babu, Attacker
- Pranav Mohanlal as a youngster (cameo appearance)
- Jyothirmayi as a beach dancer (cameo appearance)
- Ranjith Velayudhan as Simon Rosario, Michael's younger brother

== Production ==
Trisha was approached for the female lead but she could not sign it due to her busy schedule (Incl. Vinnaithaandi Varuvaayaa, which began production in late 2008). Later Bhavana replaced her. While writer S. N. Swami was working on the script of Baba Kalyani, its producer Antony Perumbavoor approached him with the idea of remaking Swami's earlier work Irupatham Noottandu. Swami contemplated the possibilities for a sequel. In the final events of the first film, the villain Shekharankutty died and Sagar is in Jail. Antony asked him after two years, and Swami suggested taking only the character Sagar and making a completely new film, neither a continuation nor a sequel. In Irupatham Noottandu, Sagar was an introvert who rarely smiles. Now, although the character has aged he is doing something that is not socially accepted.

== Music ==
Sagar alias Jacky Reloaded

Soundtrack album by Gopi Sundar
- Released: 16 March 2009
- Genre: Soundtrack
- Label: Manorama Music
- Producer: Gopi Sundar

Gopi Sundar chronology
Flash (2007)	Sagar alias Jacky Reloaded (2009)	Anwar (2010)

The film's soundtrack features six songs composed by Gopi Sundar, with lyrics by Gopi Sundar, Jofy Tharakan, Santhosh Varma and Riya Joy. The soundtrack was released by Manorama Music.

Sagar Alias Jacky Reloaded (Original Motion Picture Soundtrack)
No.	Title	Lyrics	Singer(s)	Length
1.	"Sagar Alias Jacky"	Gopi Sundar	Gopi Sundar	3:52
2.	"Melle Melle"	Jofy Tharakan	Punya Srinivas	3:48
3.	"Osama"	Santhosh Varma	Suchitra	3:26
4.	"Vennilave"	Riya Joy	Shreya Ghoshal, M. G. Sreekumar	4:33
5.	"Osama Bigblast"	Santhosh Varma	Suchitra	4:09
6.	"Sagar Alias Jacky" (Karaoke)	Gopi Sundar	Gopi Sundar	3:52
7.	"Melle Melle" (Karaoke)	Jofy Tharakan	Gopi Sundar	3:48
8.	"Vennilave" (Karaoke)	Riya Joy	Gopi Sundar	4:32

== Reception ==
Unni R Nair of The Indian Express wrote that the film's "technical brilliance wasted on an utterly nonsensical script." Sify wrote "Sagar alias Jacky Reloaded is not an unwatchable movie, but what could have been a fearless, edgy action thriller is ultimately only a half-decent enterprise because it lacks a strong story." Paresh. C. Palicha of Rediff wrote "Amal Neerad's second directorial venture after Big B is just an average fare, which is a disappointment considering the high expectations."

== Accolades ==
- Kerala State Film Awards-Best Choreography - Dinesh Kumar
