= August 15 (2011 film) =

2011 Indian Malayalam film by Shaji Kailas

- Poster
- Directed by: Shaji Kailas
- Written by: S. N. Swami
- Produced by: M. Mani
- Starring: Mammootty; Nedumudi Venu; Siddique; Saikumar; Lalu Alex; Meghana Raj; Shwetha Menon
- Cinematography: Pradeep Nair
- Edited by: Boominathan
- Music by: Rajamani
- Production company: Sunitha Productions
- Distributed by: Aroma Release & PJ Entertainments
- Release date: 24 March 2011
- Running time: 138 minutes
- Country: India
- Language: Malayalam

August 15 is a 2011 Malayalam-language crime thriller spy film directed by Shaji Kailas, written by S. N. Swamy, and produced by M. Mani. It stars Mammootty, Meghana Raj, Nedumudi Venu, Siddique, Sai Kumar, Shwetha Menon, and Lalu Alex.

The film is a sequel to the 1988 film August 1 which was directed by Sibi Malayil and written by S. N. Swamy.

August 15 was released on 24 March 2011. It received mixed reviews from critics.

== Premise ==
On 15 August, DYSP Perumal of Crime Branch in Kerala, is assigned to investigate an assassination attempt on V. G. Sadasivan, the Chief Minister of Kerala. Perumal realizes that Abraham, a cunning assassin and a professional killer who is known by several names and who leaves no evidence, is behind the assassination attempt, and a cat-and-mouse game begins with Perumal heading to capture him.

== Cast ==
- Mammootty as DySP Perumal, Crime Branch
- Nedumudi Venu as V. G. Sadasivan, Chief Minister of Kerala
- Siddique as Abraham, a professional assassin known by several names
- Jagathy Sreekumar as Aravindakshan, an aide at CM's residence
- Meghana Raj as Lakshmi, a cyber cell officer
- Shwetha Menon as Dr. Farida Hassan
- Sai Kumar as Subhash, Party Secretary
- Thalaivasal Vijay as DGP Reghuram IPS, State Police Chief
- Lalu Alex as ADGP Peter Zackariah IPS
- Biju Pappan as DGP Srinivasan IPS, Intelligence
- Madhu as Dr. George, the senior doctor who treats the CM
- Balachandran Chullikkadu as Vasudevan, political secretary to the chief minister
- Deepesh as Stephen, Perumal's assistant
- Aditya as Vinod
- Ranjith as Kannan
- Kundara Johny as Eppachan
- Chali Pala as Govindan
- Poojappura Ravi as Swami
- Krishna as SI Mohan Isaac
- Zeenath
- Harishree Ashokan as Chackochan
- Ambika Mohan as Ammini, Sadasivan's wife
- Maya Moushmi as Dr. Usha
- Reshmi Boban as Nithya, Sadasivan's daughter
- Indulekha as Radhika, a journalist
