= August 1 (film) =

August 1?
- Directed by: Sibi Malayil
- Written by: S. N. Swamy
- Based on: The Day of the Jackal by Frederick Forsyth
- Produced by: M. Mani
- Starring: Mammootty; Sukumaran; Captain Raju
- Cinematography: S. Kumar
- Edited by: V.P. Krishnan
- Music by: Shyam
- Production company: Sunitha Productions
- Distributed by: Aroma Release
- Release date: 21 July 1988
- Running time: 145 minutes
- Country: India
- Language: Malayalam

August 1? is a 1988 Indian Malayalam language action thriller spy film directed by Sibi Malayil, written by S. N. Swamy, starring Mammootty, Sukumaran and Captain Raju. The film was produced and distributed by M. Mani under the banner of Sunitha Productions. 1 August? is loosely based on the 1971 British novel The Day of the Jackal, by Frederick Forsyth which had inspired a film of the same name. The film was a commercial success and is considered one of the best investigative thrillers in Malayalam cinema.

This film was remade in Telugu as Rajakeeya Chadarangam (political chess) in 1990, with Akkineni Nageswara Rao in the chief minister role and Krishna in the inspector role. A sequel titled August 15, directed by Shaji Kailas, and scripted by S. N. Swamy was released in March 2011.

== Plot ==
K. G. Ramachandran, popularly known as KGR, is elected as the new Chief Minister of Kerala. As a young Turk with a clean image, KGR overshadows Kazhuthumuttam Vasudevan Pillai, who is another strong aspirant for the chief minister's office. Just after the meeting, Kazhuthumuttam joins Eranjoly Aboobakkar and Mathai Thomas Pappachan at a hotel room to plan the next move. Vishwanathan, commonly referred to as Vishwam is a high-profile business tycoon and political lobbyist, who joins them at the hotel. Vishwam, the political sponsor of Kazhuthumuttam, is in deep trouble as he has several business ambitions in the state. Vishwam has collected millions of rupees from several people in business, whom he had also given promises. If KGR continues in power, his plans would be ruined.

On the other hand, KGR leads a simple life along with his wife, Vatsala, a homemaker, and brings out several revolutionary changes in the state, including the dismissal of corrupt officers and changes in the liquor policy of the state. Kaimal, his party president, finds him too arrogant to tame and KGR's popularity is on a sudden rise. A desperate Vishwam decides to assassinate KGR, and later presents the plan to his friends, who, though not readily, agree to be part of it. Vishwam contacts Muniyandi Thevar, a Malaysian-based businessman and smuggler in Madras, who introduces him to a professional assassin Nicholas, but after the payment of the amount, Kazhuthumuttam feels cheated again as he has been denied the CM's post.

In a state of intoxication, Kazhuthumuttam calls up Gopu, a journalist and spits out the information that KGR will be assassinated shortly, but without committing his identity. Even though the caller does not give his name, Gopu identifies him as Kazhuthumuttam and therefore passes the information to his friend DYSP Perumal who is an honest and sharp police officer posted in the state Crime Branch. Perumal doesn't seem to take this serious at first, and since the identification of the voice of the caller by the journalist is not favourable, they conclude it is a prank call. Still, they convey the message to the higher officials. Though still not thoroughly convinced, The IG of police orders a routine investigation into the matter.

Perumal is assigned the case, and begins his investigation by arresting Vishwam, but Vishwam couldn't give any further details as he was also unaware about the whereabouts or name of the killer, except that the killer has introduced himself as Gomes, a fake name. Later it is revealed that Perumal and KGR were great friends during their college days. Perumal reaches Madras, from where he arrests Thevar by breaking into his house and brings him to Kerala. Perumal reaches at Nicholas's hiding place. Though he was not there, Perumal finds out from a newspaper that KGR has been admitted into a hospital. Realising that Nicholas went to kill KGR, he rushes to the hospital. Meanwhile, Nicholas enters the hospital disguised as a patient, and enters the CM's room where he tries to kill him, but is interrupted by Vatsala.

When Nicholas gets out of the room, he collides with Perumal, and Perumal chases him, but couldn't get out of the hospital because the cops are everywhere. Nicholas hides himself, where he attacks Perumal and escapes. As a result, Perumal gets hit on the head, but recovers soon. According to an eyewitness, Perumal issues a sketch of Nicholas and gets it broadcast on TV, but he skips from the cops miraculously. The cops search for Nicholas everywhere, where Perumal arranges security in KGR's house and everywhere. Perumal assures the IG that there would be another attempt to kill KGR on 15 August. The IG tells him to request KGR to be absent at the ceremony as he is KGR's friend, to which KGR denies later. On the day of 15 August, KGR is checking the guard of honour, Perumal waits eagerly with all police facilities to grab Nicholas.

While scanning the CCTV footages, Perumal finds Nicholas among the cops disguised in a police uniform, in the line for the guard of honour. (The assassination setting is very similar to the 30 July 1987, attempted assassination of Rajiv Gandhi, the then Prime Minister of India). Perumal sprints from the Control room and shoots down Nicholas, before he could attack KGR, thereby saving him. Nicholas is buried in the orthodox way, where Gopu questions Perumal about how the killer had got into the guard of honour. Perumal replies that he doesn't know and that had the killer been alive, then he would have asked him.

== Cast ==
- Mammootty as DYSP Perumal, CB-CID
- Sukumaran as K. G. Ramachandran (KGR), Chief Minister of Kerala, also Perumal's old collegemate and friend
- Captain Raju as Nicholas, the professional assassin known by different names: Gomes, Zacharia, Viz and Mehta
- Jagathy Sreekumar as Gopikuttan / Gopi, a personal assistant to K. G. Ramachandran
- Urvashi as Vatsala, K. G. Ramachandran's Wife
- Sreenath as Gopu, a journalist, reporter of Kerala Vartha (a fictional newspaper), also a close friend of Perumal
- G. K. Pillai as I. G. M. K. Thomas IPS
- K. P. A. C. Azeez as D. I. G. Gopal IPS
- Prathapachandran as Kazhuthumuttam Vasudevan Pillai, a heavy drunkard, a politician, MLA and leader of the ruling party, and an aspirant to the Chief Minister post
- Janardhanan as K. Divakara Kaimal, a politician, President of the ruling party
- K. P. A. C. Sunny as Vishwam, a businessman and political lobbyist
- Jagadish as Martin Varghese, Sub-Inspector of the Tamil Nadu Police
- Mamukkoya as Eranholy Aboobacker, a politician, MLA, and leader of the ruling party
- Kollam Thulasi as Mathai Thomas Pappachan, a politician, MLA, and leader of the ruling party
- Innocent as Babu, Thief
- Lizy as Nithya, Thief's Daughter
- Vijayan as Muniyandi Thevar, a businessman based in Tamil Nadu
- Bobby Kottarakkara as Shaji, Telephone Operator
- Poojappura Ravi as R B Kaimal
- Poojappura Radhakrishnan as Sugunan, Hotel Manager
- Rajan Sankaradi as Sreedharan
