= Godfather (1991 film) =

1991 Indian film by Siddique-Lal

- NFAI archived poster
- Directed by: Siddique-Lal
- Written by: Siddique-Lal
- Produced by: Appachan
- Starring: N. N. Pillai; Mukesh; Thilakan; Innocent; Bheeman Raghu; Kanaka; Philomina
- Cinematography: Venu
- Edited by: K. R. Gaurishankar; T. R. Shekhar
- Music by: S. Balakrishnan; Lyrics: Bichu Thirumala
- Production company: Swargachithra Films
- Distributed by: Swargachithra Release
- Release date: 15 November 1991 (India)
- Running time: 150 minutes
- Country: India
- Language: Malayalam

Godfather is a 1991 Indian Malayalam-language action comedy drama film written and directed by Siddique–Lal. It is produced by Appachan under the banner of Swargachithra. The film stars N. N. Pillai, Mukesh, Thilakan, Innocent, Bheeman Raghu, Jagadish, Siddique, Kanaka, K. P. A. C. Lalitha and Philomina in supporting roles. The film revolves around the rivalry between two families, the Anjooran and Aanappara houses and the consequences faced when two members of the families fall in love.

Godfather was initially planned to be released before In Harihar Nagar (1990), however Siddique-Lal felt that the film's script was not complete, and as a result stretched production time. The film was released on 15 November 1991 to positive reviews and became a commercial success, running for a record 404 days at Sreekumar theatre in Trivandrum. It was also the highest grossing Malayalam film at that time.

== Plot ==
Anjooran, and his four sons Balaraman, Swaminathan, Premachandran and Ramabhadran are in severe enmity with the Aanappara family. Anjooran's bitter hatred toward Aanappara Achhamma (Achhamma - Father's mother) stems from events in the past, when the men of Aanappara abducted Balaraman's fiancée and forced her to marry the eldest son of Achamma. The resulting series of events saw Anjooran's wife being killed, and him being sent to jail for avenging her by murdering Achamma's husband. Consequently, he develops a deep hatred and anger towards all women, and their entry into his home is prohibited from then on.

Anjooran's youngest son Ramabhadran is a law college student. At Law college, he and his friend Mayin Kutty try all means to humiliate their classmate Malu, who is the granddaughter of Achamma. Malu gets engaged to Shyam Prasad, a young state minister, but the minister withdraws from the relation as Anjooran intervenes and threatens him of political consequences. Incensed, Achamma hatches a plan to divide Anjooran's family by having Malu seduce Ramabhadran and making him turn against his father. When Malu expresses her feelings to Ramabhadran, as per the advice of her grandmother, Mayin Kutty ideates that Ramabhadran could divide the Aanappara family by seducing Malu and turning her against them. On his advice, Ramabhadran too acts as if he is in love with her. The facade soon falls and they really fall in love with each other. While wondering about ways to get his family to support this relationship, he gets to know that Swaminathan is leading a secret double life as Ramanathan, with a wife Kochammini and two children. When confronted with this information, Swaminathan promises to help unite him and Malu.

Through a turn of events, Anjooran learns of Ramabhadran's love affair and Swaminathan's deceitfulness. Consequently, they're both ostracised from the family. Over at Aanappara, Achamma is shocked to know that Malu's love is not a mere act. She and her sons decide to get her married to the family's advocate's son. However, she still tries to bring her plans to fruition by sending out signals that the house is divided over the issue. To this end, she sends her sons to beg for Anjooran's help in preventing Ramabhadran from marrying Malu (a request that Anjooran approves), and approaches Ramabhadran himself assuring him of all help in doing so.

However, Achamma does not know that her youngest son Veerabhadran is sympathetic to the lovers' cause and has revealed her plan to Ramabhadran. With his help, Ramabhadran sneaks in to the marriage hall and almost marries Malu. Enraged, Achhamma curses Anjooran for not being vigilant enough, exposing her duplicity. Ramabhadran then admits that he sneaked in not to marry Malu, but to foil Achamma's plan and save his father's honour. A regretful Anjooran allows the wedding of Ramabhadran and Malu to take place and welcomes both him, Swaminathan and their families back into the fold, thereby paving the way for the entry of women into his house once again.

== Cast ==
- N. N. Pillai as Anjooran
- Philomina as Aanappara Achamma
- Thilakan as Balaraman Anjooran, Anjooran's eldest son
- Innocent as Swaminathan Anjooran / E. K. Ramanathan, Anjooran's second son
- Bheeman Raghu as Premachandran Anjooran, Anjooran's third son
- Mukesh as Ramabhadran Anjooran, Anjooran's youngest son
- Siddique as Aanappara Veerabhadran, Achamma's youngest son
- Jagadish as Mayin Kutty, Ramabhadran's friend
- Kanaka as Aanappara Malu, Achamma's granddaughter and Parasuraman's daughter
- Janardhanan as Aanappara Bhoominathan, Achamma's second son
- Paravoor Bharathan in a dual role as :
  - Aanappara Parasuraman, Achamma's eldest son
  - Aanappara Parameswaran, Achamma's husband
- Kundara Johny as Aanappara Hemachandran, Achamma's third son
- K. P. A. C. Lalitha as Kochammini Teacher, Swaminathan's wife
- Sankaradi as Achamma's advocate
- Kollam Thulasi as Anjooran's advocate
- Ravi Vallathol as Dr. Balakrishnan, the son of Achamma's advocate and Malu's fiancée
- Thodupuzha Vasanthi as Ramani, Bhoominathan's wife
- Unni Mary as Omana, Hemachandran's wife
- Harisree Ashokan as Sathyan, Anjooran's houseboy
- Thesni Khan as Mercy, Malu's friend
- Beena Antony as Beena, Malu's friend
- Baby Ambili as Swaminathan's and Kochammini's elder daughter
- Baby Aswathi as Swaminathan's and Kochammini's younger daughter
- Thrissur Elsy as Hostel warden
- Zeenath as Kadappuram Karthyayani
- Vinod Kozhikode as Achamma's henchman

== Music ==
Godfather

Soundtrack album by S. Balakrishnan
- Released: 15 November 1991
- Recorded: 1991
- Genre: Feature film soundtrack
- Length: 18:46
- Language: Malayalam
- Label: Nisari Music
- Producer: Appachan
External audio
- Audio Jukebox on YouTube

List of songs
No.	Title	Lyrics	Singer(s)	Length
1.	"Manthrikochamma Varunnundee"	Bichu Thirumala	K. G. Markose	02:39
2.	"Neer Palunkukal"	Bichu Thirumala	M. G. Sreekumar, Sujatha Mohan	03:55
3.	"Neer Palunkukal" (Male)	Bichu Thirumala	M. G. Sreekumar	03:55
4.	"Pookkalam Vannu Pookkalam"	Bichu Thirumala	K. S. Chithra, Unni Menon	03:03
Total length:				18:46

== Box office ==
The film was a huge commercial success, becoming one among the biggest blockbusters ever in Malayalam film industry. It ran for 404 days at Sreekumar Theatre in Thiruvananthapuram alone, which still remains an unbeaten record in Malayalam film history. The film grossed ₹ 22,84,147 in 246 days from Sreekumar Theatre, Thiruvananthapuram.

== Remakes ==
The film was remade into Telugu as Peddarikam (1992). In 1993 producer N. Chandra and director Purshottam Berde remade the film into Marathi as Ghayaal. In 2004, Priyadarshan remade the film in Hindi as Hulchul. It was also remade in Kannada as Pandavaru (2006), in Bengali Bangladesh as Dadima (2006) and in Odia as Love Dot Com.

== Legacy ==
The film ran for more than 400 days in movie theatres in Kerala. Especially the film ran for 417 days in Sree Kumar Theatre in Thiruvananthapuram.

== Awards ==
- Kerala Film Critics Award for Best Second Actress - Philomina
