= Mounam Sammadham =

1990 film by K. Madhu

- Poster
- Directed by: K. Madhu
- Screenplay by: S. N. Swamy
- Story by: S. N. Swamy
- Produced by: Kovai Chezhiyan; Sembian Sivakumar
- Starring: Mammootty; Amala
- Cinematography: Vipin Das
- Edited by: V. P. Krishnan
- Music by: Ilaiyaraaja
- Production company: Kay Cee Film Combines
- Release date: 15 June 1990
- Country: India
- Language: Tamil

Mounam Sammadham (transl. Silence is acquiescence) is a 1990 Indian Tamil-language legal thriller film written by S. N. Swamy, directed by K. Madhu and produced by Kovai Chezhiyan. The film stars Mammootty (in his Tamil film debut) and Amala. It revolves around a lawyer representing a wrongfully convicted man.

The film was released on 15 June 1990, and went on to become a commercial and critical success.

== Plot ==
Sundaram is convicted of murdering his sister-in-law Vijayalakshmi and is sentenced to death. His advocate Shekar requests his friend and a supreme court advocate Raja to fight the verdict in the high court. Raja initially refuses, but agree when he finds out about Sundaram's family. Raja and Sundaram's sister Dr. Hema have had some encounters in the past, and she has a negative opinion about Raja, and he wants to rectify that. Dr. Hema initially rejects Raja, but later agrees because the family has no other choice.

Raja convinces the high court to accept the appeal, and starts investigating. Sundaram's house helper Mani, who was the only person in the house when Vijayalakshmi died, explains the events of that evening to Raja. Sundaram was supposed to be going out of town, but changed his plans and came back to the house. He smells something burning and wakes up Mani, who was sleeping in the porch. They both rush upstairs to see the burning body of Vijayalakshmi.

Raja learns that Vijayalakshmi's death was initially deemed a suicide, but Sundaram was later incriminated with killing her because he purportedly had an affair with her and wanted to hide it from the world. Raja also learns about Paramasivam, a wealthy person who has some scores to settle with Sundaram. Paramasivam tries to threaten Raja to drop the appeal, but Raja doesn't relent. Paramasivam constantly persuades Vijayalakshmi's mother and brother Muthu to fight the case.

Shekar explains there were three main witnesses to the case - 1. Rani, a prostitute who testified that Sundaram used to visit her: 2 - Munusamy - a neighbor who testified that he saw Sundaram molesting Vijayalakshmi, and 3 - a letter that Vijayalakshmi wrote to her mom about Sundaram abusing her. Raja meets Rani and convinces her to withdraw the false testimony. Hema is impressed with Raja and her resentment towards Raja begins to thaw.

Hearings begin in High Court. Rani reneges on her promise and testified once again that Sundaram was her customer. It appears like she is under some duress. Munusamy the neighbor testifies that he saw Sundaram was molesting Vijayalakshmi through a glass window that night, but Raja exposes his testimony. Raja also proves the letter that Vijayalakshmi purportedly wrote to her mother was fabricated. Raja further questions Mani and makes him reveal the truth - Vijayalakshmi had a love affair prior to her marriage with Mani's nephew Natarajan. Natarajan came home that evening to demand a ransom from Vijayalakshmi. They end up in a fight and Vijayalakshmi accidentally dies. Natarajan and Mani burn her body and stage a suicide.

After hearing Mani's testimony, the court acquits Sundaram of all charges. Hema reveals her love for Raja and they unite.

== Cast ==
- Mammootty as Adv. K.C. Raja M.A., B.L., Bar-at-law
- Amala as Dr. Hema
- Jaishankar as Sundaram
- Nagesh as Paramasivam
- R. Sarathkumar as Balu
- Sathyapriya as Savitri
- Sukumari as Sundaram's mother-in-law
- Jai Ganesh as Kalyanam
- Srikanth as Public Prosecutor Chandran
- Y. G. Mahendran as Adv. J. Shekar
- Charle as Mani
- Cochin Haneefa as Kallupatti Rangan
- Suresh Chakravarthy as Raja's friend
- Prathapachandran as Sessions Court Judge Srinivasan
- S. R. Veeraraghavan as Madras High Court Sr. Judge
- S. K. Rajavelu as High Court Judge
- Sreeja as Vijayalakshmi
- Thyagu as Gundan
- R. S. Shivaji as Alagu Guest House Caretaker
- Kumarimuthu as Munusamy
- M. S. Thripunithura as Palghat
- T. S. Raghavendra as Makkal Kural Editor
- Ennathe Kannaiah as Bank Peon
- Peeli Sivam as Circle Inspector
- Y. Vijaya as Prostitute Rani
- Nagarajacholan as Muthu
- Appa Haja as Natarajan
- Vani as Janaki
- Kokila as Kokila, Shekar's wife

== Production ==
Mounam Sammadham was the first Tamil film of Malayalam actor Mammootty. It took inspiration from his own film Sandhyakku Virinja Poovu.

== Soundtrack ==
The music was composed by Ilaiyaraaja. The song "Kalyaana Thaen Nilaa" is set in Darbari Kanada raga, and has every sentence ending with "la". "Chik Chik Chaa" is a synth-pop number.

Song	Singers	Lyrics
5 Paisa 10 Paisa	Malaysia Vasudevan	Gangai Amaran
"Chik Chik Chaa"	K. S. Chithra	Gangai Amaran
"Kalyaana Thaen Nilaa"	K. J. Yesudas K. S. Chithra	Pulamaipithan
"Oru Raja Vanthanam"	K. S. Chithra	Gangai Amaran

Telugu version

Lyrics for the dubbed Telugu version Lawyer The Great were written by Rajasri.

Song	Singers
One Two Three Four	K. S. Chithra
"Naa Raja Vacchadu"	K. S. Chithra
"Kalyaana Thaen Nilaa"	Mano, K. S. Chithra

== Reception ==
N. Krishnaswamy of The Indian Express praised the film for the cast performances (particularly Mammootty), Ilaiyaraaja's music, the cinematography and Shivaji's comedy. C. R. K. of Kalki, however, was less positive, saying the film was like an ordinary novel. The film was both a critical and commercial success.
