= Adikkurippu =

- Poster
- Directed by: K. Madhu
- Screenplay by: S. N. Swamy
- Story by: Jose Kurian
- Produced by: Thomas Mathew
- Starring: Mammootty; Jagathy Sreekumar; Urvashi
- Cinematography: Vipin Das
- Edited by: V. P. Krishnan
- Music by: Shyam
- Production company: Centauer Arts
- Distributed by: Century
- Release date: 3 March 1989
- Running time: 145 min
- Country: India
- Language: Malayalam

Adikkurippu is a 1989 Malayalam-language legal thriller film, written by S. N. Swamy and directed by K. Madhu. It stars Mammootty in the lead role, who plays the role of an advocate. The movie was praised for introducing a new theme in Malayalam by depicting the life of a castaway portrayed by Jagathy, who lands in legal problems that were rare in Malayalam movies during that time. The film is loosely based on the missing ship owned by Kerala Shipping Corporation, MV Kairali. S. N. Swamy has recognized the film as his favorite.

== Plot ==
A castaway man is rescued from sea by a merchant ship. He has no memory about who he is, or any documents to identify himself, only remembering his name, Basheer. After realizing that he is Malayali, the ship captain John Samuel, decides to help Basheer find his home, thus he contacts the local authorities for assistance. Basheer's case is thus given to Adv. Bhaskara Pillai, a brilliant lawyer, who also has a penchant for taking cases related to human rights and civil issues. Pillai, along with his friend, Police Sub Inspector Rajendran, Mentor Adv. Menon, and Menon's daughter Adv. Geetha, who is also Pillai's junior, try to piece together Basheer's past to find his identity.

Meanwhile, Pillai begins to face unseen threats and attacks from a group of people, intent on stopping him. Pillai soon learns that these attacks are being carried out by a small nexus, which includes the corrupt Home Minister Keshavan and businessman Williams, who are actually targeting Basheer. Pillai and his friends manage to evade their attacks through their quick thinking, but they are occasionally helped by an unknown person named Mr. X. Eventually, with the help of a doctor, they are able to help Basheer regain his memory, who then reveals the truth.

Basheer, along with his friend Bappootty, are hired to work in a ship called Sagar Rani, which is owned by Williams. But midway, they learn that the owners of the ship are planning to deliberately sink it, in order to collect insurance money, with Basheer and Bappootty being collateral damage. Williams' men attack Basheer and his friends after realizing that they know the truth, and throw Basheer into the sea, believing him dead. But somehow, Basheer survived. Pillai realizes that Keshavan and Williams were trying to silence Basheer, because he knows the truth about the insurance fraud.

Despite enemies, and heavy problems against them, Pillai manages to present Basheer in court by having Adv. Menon file a habeas corpus writ against Pillai for illegally detaining Basheer, and brings the truth to light. The crime is exposed and the criminals are arrested. Basheer is reunited with his family, and placed with police protection. Later, Pillai meets the Chief Minister, who had been keenly following the case, and exposes him as the mysterious Mr. X, who was helping Pillai and Basheer because he wanted to discreetly remove the corrupt and dangerous Keshavan from power, which also ensures a safer future for himself. Pillai thanks the CM, but also warns him of falling in with the wrong group again, unless he also wants to end up another political failure.

== Cast ==
- Mammootty as Adv. Bhaskara Pillai / Bhasi
- Jagathy Sreekumar as Basheer
- Urvashi as Adv. Geetha, Bhaskara Pillai's Junior Advocate
- Sukumaran as Chief Minister / Mr.X
- Lalu Alex as Captain John Samuel
- Sreenath as S. I. Rajendran / Raju, Bhaskara Pillai's Friend
- Janardhanan as Mayor Williams
- Vijayaraghavan as Mohammed Ali, Williams's Henchman
- Vijayan as Home Minister Keshavan
- Jose Prakash as Adv. Menon, Geetha's Father
- Lizy as Veena, Bhaskara Pillai's Sister and Raju's Lover
- K. P. A. C. Sunny as City Police Commissioner Karthikeyan
- Meena as Bhaskara Pillai's Mother
- Babu Namboothiri as Public Prosecutor Chandraprakash / Pothen
- Jagadish as Bappootty, Basheer's Friend (Cameo)
- Prathapachandran as Venkataraman Swamy
- K. P. A. C. Azeez as Justice Harishankar
- Kollam Thulasi as District Collector Ajayan
- Kothuku Nanappan as Aasan, Bhaskara Pillai's Clerk
- Sankaradi as Advocate Krishnakurup
- Paravoor Bharathan as P.W.D Minister Pillai
- Santhakumari as Basheer's Mother
- M. S. Thripunithura as Sukumaran, Immigration Officer
- Nandu as Jeevan, Dentist's Assistant
- Murali Mohan as Doctor
- Nassar Latheef as Sunny
- Suma Jayaram as Sainaba, Basheer's Sister
- Vijayan Peringode as Ship Worker
- Vinod Kozhikode as Williams's Henchman
- Sebi Chand P as Raman Menon
