= Nerariyan CBI =

Indian thriller film

- Nerariyan CBI CD cover
- Directed by: K. Madhu
- Written by: S. N. Swamy
- Produced by: K. Madhu
- Starring: Mammootty; Mukesh; Jagathi Sreekumar; Jishnu
- Cinematography: Saloo George
- Edited by: P. C. Mohanan
- Music by: Shyam
- Production company: Krishnakripa Release
- Distributed by: Swargachithra
- Release date: 9 September 2005
- Country: India
- Language: Malayalam
- Budget: ₹ 3 crore
- Box office: ₹ 8 crore

Nerariyan CBI (transl. To know the truth CBI) is a 2005 Indian Malayalam-language mystery film directed and produced by K. Madhu and written by S. N. Swamy. The fourth installment in the franchise of CBI investigative thrillers, Mammootty reprised the role of Sethurama Iyer, a Central Bureau of Investigation officer, with Mukesh and Jagathy Sreekumar reprising their roles as the associate officers Chacko and Vikram, respectively, and the background score composed by Shyam.

Like its prequels, Oru CBI Diary Kurippu (1988), Jagratha (1989), and Sethurama Iyer CBI (2004), Nerariyan CBI was also set as a murder mystery behind a lady who was found dead at a haunted mansion in suspicious condition.

== Plot ==
In a mansion, Mythili is found murdered, and Lakshmiyamma finds the dead body first. Mythili and her friends, including Anitha, had arrived just a day before the murder. It is also widely said that a room in that bungalow is haunted. Sai, Anitha's fiancé and a young police officer, starts investigating the case, He also starts to believe that the room is haunted because of an incident that happened to him. The case goes to the CBI and is handled by Sethurama Iyer. Soon, he finds out that the room is not haunted, Mythili was murdered, and a few family members of the mansion are involved in the murder.

== Cast ==
- Mammootty as Sethurama Iyer, SP of CBI
- Mukesh as Chacko, DYSP of CBI
- Jagathy Sreekumar as Vikram, DYSP of CBI
- Jishnu Raghavan as ASP Saikumar IPS / Sai
- Thilakan as Kapra Valiya Narayanan, an exorcist
- Mohan Jose as Velu
- Gopika as Anitha, Sai's Fiancée (Voice-over by Sreeja Ravi)
- Samvrutha Sunil as Mythili
- Suja Karthika as Reshmi, Anitha and Mythili's Friend
- Indrans as Devaswam, caretaker of the mansion
- Cochin Haneefa as George C. Nair / M. C. Nair
- Augustine as DYSP Dhanapalan
- P. Sreekumar as Dr. Krishnan Nair
- Suvarna Mathew as Maya
- M. R. Gopakumar as Hariharan Namboothiri, Mythili's Father
- Rizabawa as Dr. Babu
- V. K. Sreeraman as Shankaran
- Madhu Warrier as Benjamin C. Nair / Pradeep C. Nair
- Bindu Ramakrishnan as Lakshmiyamma
- Bindu Panicker as Elizabeth C. Nair
- Balachandran Chullikkadu as Thirumeni
- Baburaj as Poopparathy Vasu
- Meghanathan as Padmanabhan Achari
- Ravi Menon as Krishnan
- Anil Murali as Shaji, Goonda
- Baiju Ezhupunna as Balan, Goonda
- Kalabhavan Haneef as Aniyan, Villager
- Narayanankutty as Hari, Villager
- Shobha Mohan as Mythili's Mother
- Ambika Mohan as Anitha's Kin
- Seema G. Nair as Thulasi
- Jijoy Rajagopal as Richi Nedungadan

== Production ==
The success of the previous film Sethurama Iyer CBI prompted the writer S. N. Swamy and director K. Madhu to join hands again for one more installment in the series of CBI investigative thrillers. S. N. Swamy completed the screenplay in a time spanning one year. As the plot contained some supernatural themes as well, Swami had to conduct enough research on it. Director K. Madhu, who himself produced Sethurama Iyer CBI, decided to finance Nerariyan CBI too under his banner Krishna Kripa Productions. Madhu, who has collaborated with S. N. Swamy on more than ten films at the time, said, "What thrills us is that teenagers who saw 'CBI Diary Kurippu' are going to see 'Nerariyan' with their kids."

Shyam, who has composed the popular background score for the former films, was again hired to compose the score for the new film, which also lacks songs in its soundtrack. Associate Director I. Sasi and production controller Aroma Mohan have remained in the crew from the former team. Saloo George, who was the associate of the first two parts of the series, cinematographer Vipin Das who has done cinematography in Sethurama Iyer CBI, was signed in to lead the direction of photography in Nerariyan CBI as well. Principal photography began after a discussion on the whole screenplay was conducted, that was usual in former films too. Apart from Mammootty, Mukesh, and Jagathi Sreekumar who comprised the team of CBI investigators, Nedumudi Venu, Thilakan, Samvrutha Sunil, Gopika, Suja Karthika, and Jishnu were added to the cast to play other prominent roles in the film. During the on-location filming "the trick of keeping the suspense alive till the end of the film" was difficult, according to Mukesh.

== Reception ==
A critic from Sify assessed the film as "good'" and lauded S.N.Swamy for "making something spectacular out of ordinary material", the "mood enhancing" background score by Shyam, and the "commendable" cinematography of Salu George, noting that "The highlight of the film is Mammootty as the suave and intelligent Sethurama Iyer who looks dashing and debonair. Another interesting highlight is the war of words between Iyer and Kapra (Thilakan), a local sorcerer which ignites the screen." The reviewer, however, criticised K. Madhu's "old school of film making" style and "irritating" frequent in-film ads. The review concludes by saying "On the whole, our two thumbs go up for the return of Sethurama Iyer. Can't wait for CBI-5!"

== Box office ==
The film was a commercial success.
