= Moonnam Mura =

- Theatrical release poster
- Directed by: K. Madhu
- Written by: S. N. Swamy
- Produced by: G. P. Vijayakumar
- Starring: Mohanlal; Suresh Gopi; Lalu Alex; Mukesh; Babu Antony
- Cinematography: Vipindas
- Edited by: V. P. Krishnan
- Music by: Shyam (Score)
- Production company: Vandana
- Distributed by: Seven Arts Release
- Release date: 9 November 1988
- Country: India
- Language: Malayalam

Moonnam Mura (transl. The Third Degree) is a 1988 Indian Malayalam-language action thriller film directed by K. Madhu and written by S. N. Swamy. It stars Mohanlal, Suresh Gopi and Lalu Alex. The plot deals with a terrorist group led by Charles kidnapping a group of political individuals who were vacationing, and the followed up rescue operation of the police led by Ali Imran.

The film was released on November 9th, Diwali day and was one of the highest-grossing films of 1988, and had a record opening day collection. It also did good business in the neighboring states Tamil Nadu and Andhra Pradesh, running for over 150 and 100 days respectively. Moonnam Mura was remade in Telugu as Magadu (1990), starring Rajasekhar.

== Plot ==
A group of high-ranking political officials are on a trip when their bus is hijacked by a group of terrorists headed by Charles. They demand the release of their old colleagues languishing in prison in exchange for safe release of the politicians. DIG Menon is handling the negotiations. Soon things start getting out of control and couple of hostages are killed.

That's when Menon decides to enlist the help of Ali Imran in rescuing the hostages. Ali is an ex cop who quit the police force out of disgust due to the unfair treatment meted out to him while he was in the force. This decision is met with some opposition from the Chief of police and his son in law as their politics and attitude prompted Ali to leave the force.

Though unwilling at first, Ali is persuaded by Menon and decides to go ahead with the rescue mission. After careful surveillance Ali along with a couple of his friends is able to sneak into the palace where the hostages are bundled up and manages to rescue them and finish off Charles in the end.

== Cast ==
- Mohanlal as CI Ali Imran
- Suresh Gopi as Vaishakhan
- Lalu Alex as Charles
- Mukesh as Vinod
- Sukumaran as DIG Menon IPS
- Revathi as Mini Johnson
- Murali as Jayan
- Janardhanan as IG Mathews IPS
- Sreenath as DYSP Raju, Mathews's son-in-law
- Prathapachandran as Central Minister Bharathan Menon
- Vijayaraghavan as Karunan
- Babu Antony as Antony
- Ponnambalam as Peter, Ali Imran's friend and Kalaripayattu Master
- Innocent as MP Kisan Jacob
- C. I. Paul as Home Minister
- Babu Namboothiri as Mohan, Ali Imran's friend
- Paravoor Bharathan as Balakrishnan
- Mala Aravindan as Bus Driver
- Kollam Thulasi as Home Secretary
- Jose as Doctor
- M. S. Thripunithura as Namboothiri
- T. P. Madhavan as Panicker
- Mohan Raj as Goonda
- V. K. Sreeraman as Simon
- Priya as Ali Imran's sister
- Shyama as Bharathan Menon's daughter
- Valsala Menon as Bharathan Menon's wife
- Lalithasree as Panicker's wife
- Suma Jayaram as Bharathan Menon's daughter
- Praseetha Menon as Panicker's daughter
- K. Madhu as Ship Roomboy (Cameo Appearance)
- Mafia Sasi as Goonda
- Dr. Jayan as Goonda
- Adinad Sasi as Journalist

== Reception ==
Moonnam Mura was one of the highest-grossing Malayalam films of the year. The film had a large pre-release hype, that resulted in a large crowd on the opening day. On the release day at Jose theatre, Thrissur, 15 people were injured and one died due to mass rush for the film.

== Remakes ==
Year	Title	Language	Cast	Director
1989	Magadu	Telugu	Rajasekhar, Lizy, Thyagarajan, Murali Mohan	K. Madhu
