= Radha Vinod Raju =

Indian police officer (1949–2012)

Radhavinod Raju
- Born: 27 July 1949; Mattancherry
- Died: 21 June 2012 (aged 62); Kochi, Kerala
- Education: Maharaja's College
- Occupation: IPS Officer

Radhavinod Raju (27 July 1949 – 21 June 2012) was an Indian Police Service (IPS) officer. He joined the police service in 1975 as Jammu and Kashmir cadre batch. The character Sethurama Iyer, who is the main protagonist of CBI film series in Malayalam films, portrayed by Mammootty is said to have been inspired by Radha Vinod Raj.

== Early life and education ==
Radhavinod Raju was born in Mattancherry, Kochi, Kerala. His father R.S. Raju was a post master in Fort Kochi. He is survived by his wife Achamma and two daughters Sindhoo and Renu. His nephew is Music director/Actor Siddharth Vipin.

He got MSc in Physics from Maharaja's College, Ernakulam, Kerala. He entered into Indian Police Service when he was working as an Officer in Union Bank of India, Goa.

== Career ==
His first appointment as Superintendent of police in Poonch District, Jammu and Kashmir. Then he joined SP in Central Bureau of Investigation (CBI), Ernakulam. After that he served as DIG in Jammu and Kashmir.

On 19 January 2009, he was appointed as the first chief of India's National Investigation Agency. Before that he held the post of Director General of vigilance department of Jammu and Kashmir.

He headed the operational wing of the Special Investigation Team (SIT) which found the killers of Rajiv Gandhi in 1991. His service history also includes important cases like the Kandahar flight hijacking, Purulia arms drop case etc.

He was working as a CBI officer in Kerala in 1983–89. At the time he investigated very important cases in Kerala police history like Polakkulath murder case, Panoor SI Soman murder case, Augustine murder case, Sujatha murder case.

== Death ==
He died in Kochi on 21 June 2012 at the age of 62, due to lung complications. Until his death, he served as an advisory council member of Central Vigilance Commission.

== Bibliography ==
- Triumph of truth:the Rajiv Gandhi assassination, the investigation by D. R. Kaarthikeyan, Radhavinod Raju; Publisher – New Dawn Press, 2004; ISBN 9781904910046
- Rajiv Gandhi Vadham Oru Kuttanweshanam(Malayalam) by D. R. Kaarthikeyan, Radhavinod Raju; Publisher – Olive; ISBN 9788188779048

== See also ==
- Rajiv Gandhi
- Assassination of Rajiv Gandhi
- Kandahar flight hijacking
- Purulia arms drop case
- D. R. Karthikeyan
