= Adayalam =

- Promotional Poster
- Directed by: K. Madhu
- Written by: S. N. Swamy
- Produced by: Janardhanan
- Starring: Mammootty; Rekha; Shobana; Murali
- Cinematography: Vipindas
- Edited by: V.P. Krishnan
- Music by: Shyam
- Release date: 10 May 1991
- Country: India
- Language: Malayalam

Adayalam (transl. Mark) is a 1991 Indian Malayalam comedy-mystery film directed by K. Madhu and written by S. N. Swamy, starring Mammootty, Rekha, Shobana, Murali, Lalu Alex, and Maniyanpilla Raju. The film was produced by actor Janardhanan, who also played a supporting role.

== Plot ==
Latha, daughter of Menon, a rich businessman, gets a threatening call from Raji demanding Rs 5 lakhs not to reveal a deadly secret about her father. Frightened Latha approaches her family advocate, Haridas, for a solution. Haridas refers Latha to Captain Hariharan who now runs a security service. Though initially, he is reluctant to take up the investigation on Raji, Haiharan decides to go ahead. In the meantime, Raji is found dead. Inspector Raju Peter suspects Hariharan who informs Latha about the death. Malini, Latha's sister, inquires with Hariharan about Raji, Latha, and the reason for the probe. Hariharan refuses to divulge and says it's personal. Meanwhile, Suresh, their cousin, is found dead too. Hariharan's probe to find the truth forms the rest of the story.

== Cast ==
- Mammootty as Captain Hariharan
- Shobana as Malini, Hariharan's love interest
- Rekha as Latha, Malini's sister
- Murali as Dr. Mohan, Latha's family friend and Malini's ex-lover
- Lalu Alex as CI Raju Peter, Hariharan's friend
- Maniyanpilla Raju as Pappan, Hariharan's friend and assistant
- Vijayaraghavan as Suresh, Malini and Latha's cousin
- Janardhanan as Advocate Haridas, Hariharan's friend
- Innocent as DYSP S. Vishwappan, Peter's subordinate officer
- Sankaradi as Panicker, Hariharan and Pappan's house owner
- K. P. Ummer as Shankara Menon, Latha and Malini's father
- Kalpana as Rosemary, Pappan's love interest and Hariharan's assistant
- Kunchan as Sub Inspector of Police, Peter's assistant
- T. P. Madhavan as Forensic Surgeon M.K. Keshavan, Hariharan's friend
- Valsala Menon as Sarojini, Shankara Menon's sister and Latha and Malini's aunt
- Bheeman Raghu as Raju, Shankara Menon's driver and Suresh's friend
- Ragini as Raji, Suresh and Raju's friend

== Box office ==
The film received a positive response from the critics and was a commercial success.

In his memoir, "Innaleyude Innu", Janardhanan says that he sold the movie outright to producer Good Knight Mohan. He also said that the movie was not as much a financial success as they expected.
