= CBI 5: The Brain =

2022 film directed by K. Madhu

- Theatrical release poster
- Directed by: K. Madhu
- Written by: S. N. Swamy
- Produced by: Swargachitra Appachan
- Starring: Mammootty; Mukesh; Jagathy Sreekumar; Saikumar; Renji Panicker
- Cinematography: Akhil George
- Edited by: A. Sreekar Prasad
- Music by: Jakes Bejoy
- Production company: Swargachithra Films
- Distributed by: Swargachithra films
- Release date: 1 May 2022
- Running time: 164 minutes
- Country: India
- Language: Malayalam
- Budget: ₹15 crore
- Box office: est. ₹37 crore

CBI 5: The Brain is a 2022 Indian Malayalam-language mystery thriller film directed by K. Madhu and written by S. N. Swamy. The film stars Mammootty reprising his role as CBI officer Sethurama Iyer along with an ensemble cast. It is the fifth installment of CBI film series.

The film was released in theatres on 1 May 2022, and received mixed reviews from critics and audiences. It was praised for Mammootty's performance and the nostalgic moments but criticised for its other performances, writing, length, old-school narration and climax. Despite this, it went on to become a commercial success at the box office.

== Plot ==
Aparna is an IPS trainee, who leaves her house for a seminar, hosted by the CBI for IPS trainees. DSP Balagopal and Inspector Vinay, two officers from the CBI host the program until they start to talk about several cases that the CBI has handled so far. They discuss a particular case known as the Basket Killings which was successfully investigated by the senior CBI officer Sethurama Iyer.

The case took place in October 2012 when Home Minister of Kerala state Abdul Samad dies en route to Nedumbassery from Delhi, in an aircraft. Many believe he died of natural causes, but some find it mysterious. The suspicions escalate when Samad's doctor Venu is also found dead under mysterious circumstances. Protests take place asking the government to order an investigation into the death of Samad. A journalist named Bhasuran heads these protests and the next day he is found murdered by hanging. A cop named Josemon is also found to be murdered the next day. The police understand that he was murdered by a car that hit and ran over him. The police come to the conclusion that these murders are related and names them as Basket Killings.

The case is handed over to DYSP Sathyadas, a corrupt cop who hates the CBI, particularly Iyer, but the IG K.C Unnithan is against handing over the case to Sathyadas, citing his corruption. Unnithan shares these concerns with the DGP, but he rejects his plea and asks him to wait. Sathyadas finally concludes that the murder of Josemon is linked to a sand trafficker named Sam. Out of suspicion, he takes Sam under custody. Meanwhile, a petition has been moved on court to hand over the case to CBI by Josemon's family. The case is headed by Sathyadas' wife Adv. Pratibha, who seems to have her own reasons for encouraging the petition.

At the same time the CBI had also given a workload petition in the court. Later, Unnithan requests Balagopal to revisit this controversial decision, withdraw the workload petition and to bring justice to Josemon's family. So, Balagopal meets Iyer at CBI Headquarters in New Delhi and they meet the CBI Director who decides to withdraw the workload petition. The case is eventually handed over to the CBI and Iyer is called upon by the Kerala Government and his associates at the CBI office in Kerala. Iyer reveals that Samad and the Chief Minister had come to visit him to talk about a youth named Mansoor who was a relative of Samad and that he had joined a militant group some years ago.

They focus on Sam and learn that Adv. Pratibha and Sam are acquainted. They question her and she proves that she has no involvement in the killings. They find Sam dead in a remote place after his escape from a hospital earlier while he was under custody. The CBI suspect his death is also a murder, but it is revealed in the forensic reports that his death was due to a heart attack. They decide to search Bhasuran's house and they also question his friend. They find evidence that the killer might be a person named Mansoor and Iyer and his team suspect the involvement of the same Mansoor that was Samad's relative. They also heard this name before from the Dr. Venu's wife and his driver as well. During the search, Vinay finds a portrait that resembles one of the people he saw in the Delhi Airport CCTV recordings, and learn that his name is Sandeep and that he is linked to DYSP Vikram, a CBI official who is a victim of a murder attempt. Iyer and his team pay him a visit along with DYSP Chacko, a long-time friend of both Iyer and Vikram.

Iyer learns from a paralysed Vikram that Sandeep's actual name is Paul Meyjo. Later they find Meyjo at a private space near a beach. While questioning him they find many designs to a pacemaker and notes describing how to hack a pacemaker. They ask Meyjo about this and he tells them that he made those to prove his friend, Dr. Venu's claim that a person cannot externally hack a pacemaker. They are forced to release Meyjo due to a lack of evidence. Later, Sathyadas comes to meet Iyer to share with him that he had seen lights coming out of Sam's guesthouse, which was supposedly empty. Iyer decides to investigate and finds that someone was indeed there. Iyer conjectures that murder of Samad was an accident and the original intended victim was Susan, a patient of the Dr. Venu and the wife of a renowned doctor, Dr. George Abraham. She is visited by a priest-disguised Meyjo not long before the CBI infiltrate the house to save her.

Meyjo tries to flee, before being arrested, and interrogated. They find an article ripped from a newspaper in his bible, which contained a photo to identify Susan. Iyer stays behind to question Susan. Susan was previously named Ambika, who was Unnithan's ex-wife. It is revealed that Meyjo was indeed the one who killed Abdul Samad on the orders of Sam and Unnithan. Unnithan had acute schizophrenia and very suspicious about his wife. He always abused her, so she left him, but he resolved to eliminate her. After the accidental murder of Samad, Sam and Meyjo decided to kill Dr. Venu as he had grown suspicious of Meyjo. They killed Bhasuran for organising protests to find the real murderers of Samad's murder. Josemon, who had a daily routine of morning walk, passed through the front gates of Sam's guesthouse to find Unnithan and Sam colluding.

The very next day, Sam was ordered by Unnithan to kill Josemon and he in turn instructed Meyjo. He did so by hitting and running his vehicle over Josemon. Iyer visits Unnithan, who boasts that Iyer will never be able to prove that he was the one who ordered Meyjo to commit the murder. Iyer is initially stumped, then suddenly figures out that the newspaper from which Meyjo got the target's photo would be in Unnithan's house. He finds it, and now has physical proof that Unnithan and Meyjo met and discussed plans to kill Susan. Unnithan gets arrested and later dies due to a heart attack during the trial. Sometime later, Iyer goes to the prison and happens to encounter Meyjo in his cell. Meyjo warns him that Iyer is his next target. Iyer is bemused at his challenge and says about Vikram and what happened to him, after which he walks away confidently.

== Cast ==
- Mammootty as Sethurama Iyer, SSP, CBI
- Mukesh as Chacko, DYSP, CBI
- Jagathy Sreekumar as Vikram, DYSP, CBI, (cameo appearance)
- Anoop Menon as IG K.C Unnithan IPS
- Soubin Shahir as Paul Meyjo / Sandeep / Mansoor
- Saikumar as DYSP Sathyadas
- Renji Panicker as Balagopal, DYSP, CBI
- Dileesh Pothan as Prakash Nambiar Chief Minister of Kerala
- Asha Sharath as Adv. Prathibha Sathyadas
- Kaniha as Susan George / Ambika Unnithan, Unnithan's ex-wife and Dr. George Abraham's new wife
- Ramesh Pisharody as Vinayachandran, CI, CBI
- Ansiba Hassan as Anitha Varma, SI, CBI
- Prasanth Alexander as Sudhi Nair, SI,CBI
- Sudev Nair as SI Iqbal Hussain
- Jayakrishnan as CI Josemon
- Malavika Menon as Aparna, IPS Trainee
- Kottayam Ramesh as Anwar, Abdul Samad's P. A
- Santhosh Keezhattoor as DYSP Babu Raj
- Harish Raj as Sam, a sand contractor
- Malavika Nair as Josemon's wife
- Swasika as Merlin, Sam's wife
- Prathap Pothen as Dr. George Abraham, Susan's new husband
- G. Suresh Kumar as Home Minister Abdul Samad
- Ravikumar as CBI Director Nakul Sharma IPS
- Audrey Miriam Henest as Aparajitha
- Rajkumar Sreekumar as Vikram's son
- Arjun Nandhakumar as Anil Thomas
- Krishna as Doctor
- Chandunath G Nair as Bhasuran, an activist
- Durga Nataraj as Arundhathi, Bhasuran's "friend"
- Azees Nedumangad as Boban (Police Head Constable)
- Sajipathi as ASI Surendran
- Aniyappan as Police Constable
- Kalabhavan Jinto as Jinto, Sethurama Iyer's driver
- Maya Vishwanath as Abdul Samad's wife
- George Oomen as Groom in Photo
- Sminu Sijo as Muthukkoya's sister
- Ranjini George as Aparna's mother
- Pradeep Menon as Dr. Venu
- Sindhu Manu Varma as Dr. Venu's wife
- Idavela Babu as Mammen Varghese
- Lukman Avaran as Muthukkoya

== Music ==
The soundtrack and score is composed by Jakes Bejoy in his first collaboration with Mammootty. The audio rights for the film were bought by Saina. For the main theme of the film, Jakes recreated the original theme from the first film composed by Shyam.

== Production ==
=== Filming ===
Principal photography commenced on 29 November 2021 in Ernakulam. Mammootty joined the sets on 11 December 2021.

== Release ==
=== Theatrical ===
On 29 April Promo of the film was screened on Burj Khalifa. The film was released on 1 May 2022, as an Eid release in theaters.

=== Home media ===
The digital rights of the film is acquired by Netflix and started streaming from 12 June 2022. The satellite rights of the film is bought by Surya TV.

== Reception ==
The movie received positive to mixed reviews, with praise of performances of Mammootty and Saikumar and the appearances of Mukesh and Jagathy Sreekumar.

The Times of India rated the movie 3.5/5 and commented that "A tantalising and twisty crime thriller" along with the advice of "Just stay away from spoilers as smartly as you can!". Indian Express commented "Mammootty effortlessly transforms into Sethurama Iyer in an intelligently woven script". Anna M. M. Vetticad from Firstpost wrote "Instead of staying true to the original's tone, CBI 5 throws bombastic and stilted lines into the mix in what appears to be a misplaced attempt at contemporisation" The Hindu commented "Not a worthy sequel to a memorable series". The News Minute reviewed that " Mammootty retains Sethurama Iyer's traits, but can't save film."

=== Box office ===
CBI 5: The Brain, earned a gross collection of ₹37 crore (US$3.8 million) in Overseas and India.
