= S. N. Swamy =

Indian screenwriter and actor

- Born: Kochi, Kerala, India
- Occupation: Screenwriter
- Years active: 1985–present
- Known for: CBI film series

Sivaram Narayana Swamy is a screenwriter, director and actor who works in the Indian film industry predominantly in the Malayalam cinema. Having born in Kochi, Kerala Swamy is particularly known for scripting films in the thriller genre. He has frequently collaborated with directors K. Madhu, Joshiy and A. K. Sajan.

== Career ==
Swamy is the creator of some of the well-known fictional characters in Malayalam cinema including Sethurama Iyer (portrayed by Mammootty) and Sagar Alias Jacky (portrayed by Mohanlal). Sagar Alias Jacky, a notorious gold smuggler, was the protagonist in Irupatham Noottandu (1987) and the eponymous Sagar alias Jacky Reloaded (2009), its spiritual successor. Sethurama Iyer, a CBI officer and the protagonist of the CBI film series, was inspired by a real-life police officer called Radhavinod Raju who retired as Chief of India's National Investigative Agency. The film had five sequels. The character Inspector Balram played by Mammootty in the films Avanazhi(1986) & sequel Balram vs. Tharadas(2006) and Ali Imran, a cop played by Mohanlal in Moonnam Mura (1988) are some of his other creations.

== Filmography ==
Year	Title	Film director
1984	Chakkarayumma	Sajan
1985	Koodum Thedi	Paul Babu
1985	Oru Nokku Kanan	Sajan
1985	Kandu Kandarinju	Sajan
1986	Akalathe Ambili	Jeassy
1986	Snehamulla Simham	Sajan
1986	Geetham	Sajan
1986	Ennum Nathante Nimmi	Sajan
1987	Irupatham Noottandu	K. Madhu
1988	Oru CBI Diary Kurippu	K. Madhu
1988	August 1	Sibi Malayil
1988	Oohakachavadam	K. Madhu
1988	Moonnam Mura	K. Madhu
1988	Charithram	G. S. Vijayan
1989	Naduvazhikal	Joshiy
1989	Jagratha	K. Madhu
1989	Carnivel	P. G. Viswambharan
1989	Adikkurippu	K. Madhu
1989	Mounam Sammadham	K. Madhu
1990	Kalikkalam	Sathyan Anthikkadu
1990	Parampara	Sibi Malayil
1991	Chanchattam	Thulasidas
1991	Apoorvam Chilar	Kaladharan
1991	Adayalam	K. Madhu
1993	Dhruvam	Joshiy
1994	Sainyam	Joshiy
1995	Oru Abhibhashakante Case Diary	K. Madhu
1996	Aayiram Naavulla Ananthan	Thulasidas
1997	Oral Mathram	Sathyan Anthikkadu
1998	The Truth	Shaji Kailas
2001	Nariman	K. Madhu
2004	Agninakshathram	Kareem
2004	Sethurama Iyer CBI	K. Madhu
2005	Nerariyan CBI	K. Madhu
2006	Balram vs. Tharadas	I. V. Sasi
2006	Baba Kalyani	Shaji Kailas
2007	Janmam	Joshi
2008	Positive	V. K. Prakash
2009	Rahasya Police	K. Madhu
2009	Sagar alias Jacky Reloaded	Amal Neerad
2010	Janakan	Sanjeev N. R.
2011	August 15	Shaji Kailas
2013	Lokpal	Joshiy
2022	CBI 5	K. Madhu
2024	Secret	Himself

== Awards and nominations ==
Award	Year	Project	Category	Outcome
Movie Street Film Award	2019	N.A	Lifetime Achievement Award	Won
