= M. S. Thripunithura =

Indian actor (1943–2006)

- Born: Madathilparambil Seshan Venkitaraman; 26 May 1943; Thripunithura, Kingdom of Cochin (present-day Kochi, Kerala, India)
- Died: 8 March 2006 (aged 62); Shoranur, Kerala, India
- Occupations: Actor; Teacher
- Spouse: Bhagyalakshmi
- Children: 3

Madathilparambil Seshan Venkitaraman (26 May 1943 – 8 March 2006), known by his stage name M. S. Thripunithura, was an Indian actor who worked in Malayalam film Industry. He was born in Thripunithura in the erstwhile Cochin State. He died in Shoranur due to cardiac arrest while he was on the way to Ernakulam.

== Actor ==
M. S. Thripunithura made his debut in the movie Kadalamma. Thripunithura acted in over 300 Malayalam films including hit films Oru Minnaminunginte Nurunguvettam (1987), Perumthachan (1990), His Highness Abdullah (1990), Santhwanam (1991), Bharatham and Yoddha (1992). As a stage artist, he has won the Kerala State Award for Best Actor for his role in the play, Mochanam.

He was also a Carnatic musician and had interests in Sanskrit and astrology. Thripunithura was also interested in cooking, which he developed from his grandfather, Veeraraghava Iyer, who was the cook for the Maharajah of Cochin.

== Personal life ==
M. S. Thripunithura was married to Bhagyalakshmi and has three daughters Poornima, Pushpa, Pooja. He had a late marriage, marrying at the age of around 45. He died in the early hours of 8 March 2006 after suffering from a cardiac arrest while on a train journey. He was cremated at the premises of his home in Thripunithura in the same evening.

== Filmography ==
Year	Title	Role	Notes
1979	Angakkuri		
1979	Agni Vyooham		
1983	Sandhya Vandanam	Marar	
1984	Swanthamevide Bandhamevide	Indulekha's father	
1987	Oru Minnaminunginte Nurunguvettam	Bhadran Nampoothiripadu	
1987	Oridathu	Nampoothirippadu	
1988	Moonnam Mura	Namboothiri	
1988	Kakkothikkavile Appooppan Thaadikal	Valsala's Father	
1988	1921	Swaminathan	
1988	Puravrutham	Landlord	
1989	Naduvazhikal	M.L.A. Chandradas	
1989	Dasharatham	Adv. Govindan	
1989	Chanakyan	Geethu's father	
1989	Jagratha	Editor Kurup	
1989	Carnivel	Head Constable Kanaran	
1990	Veena Meettiya Vilangukal		
1990	Randam Varavu	Adv. Ramanuja Iyer	
1990	Iyer the Great	Moorthy	
1990	Parampara	Meera's father	
1990	Nagarangalil Chennu Raparkam	Kunjoottan's Uncle	
1990	Orukkam	Koyikal Madhava Kurup	
1990	His Highness Abdulla	Nampoothiri	
1991	Innathe Program	Indu's father	
1991	Cheppu Kilukkunna Changathi	Chidambara Krishna Iyer	
1991	Santhwanam	Swaminathan	
1991	Inspector Balram	Krishna Pillai	
1992	Yodha	Kutti Mama	
1993	Venkalam	Damodaran Nampoothiri	
1993	Pravachakan	Chief Minister	
1993	Kunjikkannan	Poovathil Kunjikannan	
1993	Sakshal Sreeman Chathunni	Kalpana's father	
1994	Gamanam	Ananthapadhmanabha Iyyer	
1994	Kudumba Vishesham	Aswathy's father	
1994	Bheesmacharya		
1995	Aniyan Bava Chetan Bava	College Professor	
1995	Special Squad	Vasudevan Nair	
1995	Aksharam	Kunjikrishna Pothuwal	
1995	Vrudhanmare Sookshikkuka	Warrier	
1995	Achan Kombathu Amma Varampathu	Sharady	
1995	Thirumanassu	Achutha Kurup	
1995	Sreeragam	Harihara Iyer	
1996	Devaraagam		
1996	Lalanam	Swamy	
1996	April 19		
1997	Junior Mandrake	Astrologer	
1997	Manasam	Rajalakshmni's father	
1997	Gajaraja Manthram	Ananthan's Uncle	
1998	Kalaapam	Krishnanunni Mashu	
1999	Crime File	Namasivaya Swami	
1999	Vazhunnor	Head Master	
1999	Udayapuram Sulthan	Vasudevan Namboothiri	
1999	Pathram	Konathiri	
2000	Manassil Oru Manjuthulli		
2000	Ingane Oru Nilapakshi		
2000	India Gate		
2000	Kallu Kondoru Pennu	Anandakuttan Ammavan	
2000	Melevaryathe Malakhakkuttikal	Magistrate	
2001	Barthavudhyodam	Menon	
2001	Sundara Purushan	Advocate	
2001	Andolanam		
2002	Kakke Kakke Koodevide		
2004	Freedom		
2004	Natturajavu	Kurup	
2004	Nirapakittu		
2005	Kalyana Kurimanam	Astrologer	
2006	Shyamam	Thirumeni	

== Television serials ==
- Manasi (Doordarshan)
- Kavyanjali (Surya TV)
- Thaali (Surya TV)
- Sthree (Asianet)
- Melappadam (Doordarshan)
- Kairalivilasam lodge (Doordarshan)
- Kadamattath kathanar (Asianet)
