= Sethurama Iyer CBI =

- DVD cover
- Directed by: K. Madhu
- Written by: S. N. Swamy
- Produced by: K. Madhu
- Starring: Mammootty; Mukesh; Jagathy Sreekumar
- Cinematography: Saloo George
- Edited by: P. C. Mohanan
- Music by: Shyam
- Production company: Krishnakripa Release
- Distributed by: Swargachitra films
- Release date: 23 January 2004
- Country: India
- Language: Malayalam
- Budget: ₹1.35 crore
- Box office: est. ₹16 crore

Sethurama Iyer CBI is a 2004 Indian Malayalam-language mystery crime film directed by K. Madhu and written by S. N. Swamy. It stars Mammootty in the title role, alongside Mukesh and Jagathy Sreekumar in supporting roles. Shyam composed the background score for the film.

The film is the third installment in the CBI film series, featuring Mammootty as CBI officer Sethurama Iyer. The film was the highest-grossing film of the year, collecting around distributors share of ₹4 crore and a gross around ₹16 crore. The success of the film made Mammootty "Man of the year". The base story and initial scenes are adopted from Arthur Hailey's novel Detective. Some of the scenes of the film are also loosely based on the 2001 Aluva massacre.

== Plot ==
The movie begins with Sethurama Iyer visiting Isow Alex, a convicted serial killer who is awaiting his execution. Alex was arrested and convicted for the cold-blooded murder of seven people in two different families, unrelated to each other, on the same night. Alex, who had been living a wild life then, had committed the crime high on narcotic drugs. The murder case was left to the CBI for investigation and an able officer, Balagopal, nabbed Alex in no time. Alex is now a new man, mainly due to the influence of a priest, who requests Iyer to visit Alex.

What Alex tells Iyer is startling; he didn't commit one of the seven murders he was convicted for. The murder was that of Manikkunju, a businessman. Manikkunju, along with his daughter-in-law Mosi, was murdered at his house. Alex tells this all the same confessing that he murdered Mosi. The possibility of another killer involved is very remote and Alex is a serial killer who thoroughly denied any hand in the murders when he was arrested, but yet Iyer decides to reopen the case and investigate. He faces many odds; to prove Alex right would be proving his own bureau wrong and to prove Alex wrong would be wasting time and money.

== Cast ==
- Mammootty as Sethurama Iyer, SP of Central Bureau of Investigation (CBI)
- Mukesh as Chacko, Inspector of CBI
- Jagathy Sreekumar as Vikram, DYSP of CBI
- Siddique as Balagopal, DYSP of CBI
- Jagadish as Tailor Mani
- Kalabhavan Mani as Isho Alex
- Saikumar as DYSP Sathyadas
- Vineeth Kumar as Ganesh, SI of CBI
- Janardhanan as Ouseppachan
- Sreenath as Sunny
- Rajan P. Dev as Sub Registrar Bahuleyan
- Oduvil Unnikrishnan as Adiyodi
- Paravoor Ramachandran as Zachariah (Manikunju)
- Geetha Vijayan as Mosi
- Navya Nair as Rachana, Sethurama Iyer's niece
- Nandana as Reshmi, Sethurama Iyer's niece
- Kunchan as Krishna Iyer
- Urmila Unni as Meenakshi Iyer
- Appa Haja as Monichan
- Poornima Anand as Dr. Vijayalakshmi (police surgeon)
- Kalpana as Vijayamma Mani
- Mala Aravindan as Kuzhivetti Mathai
- Kalasala Babu as Nair, CBI director
- Bharath Gopi as Fr. Gomez
- Adoor Bhavani as Mary
- Shammi Thilakan as CI Pavithran, Crime Branch
- Subair as Sharngadaran
- KPAC Sabu as Kolady Varkey
- Suraj Venjaramoodu as a broker
- Kollam Ajith as Sub-inspector
- J. Pallassery as Temple committee member
- K. T. S. Padannayil as Temple committee member
- Kochaniyan as Simon Thomas, Mosi's father
- Lissy Jose as Molly, Mosi's mother
- Kulappulli Leela as Servant Mariyakkutty
- Aniyappan as Auto driver
- Kailas Nath as Chef Ambiswamy
- S.I.Rajashekharan as Jailor Raju
- Sukumaran as Retd. DYSP Devadas, Sathyadas's late father (photo presence)
- Prathapachandran as Narayanan, Ouseppachan's late friend (photo presence)
- Vijayaraghavan as Johnykutty (mentioned only)
- Lissy as Omana, Sunny's late wife (mentioned only)

== Production ==
Originally, the CBI officer in the film Oru CBI Diary Kuruppu was supposed to be a rough-and-tough cop named Ali Imran. It was Mammootty who suggested that a simple-looking brahmin who uses his brains more than his brawn would be a better idea.

== Box office ==
The film was a commercial success and became highest grossing Malayalam film of the year 2004 and also collected around ₹16 crore from the box office. The film ran around 200 days in theatres.

== See also ==
- 2001 Aluva massacre
