= K. Madhu =

Indian filmmaker

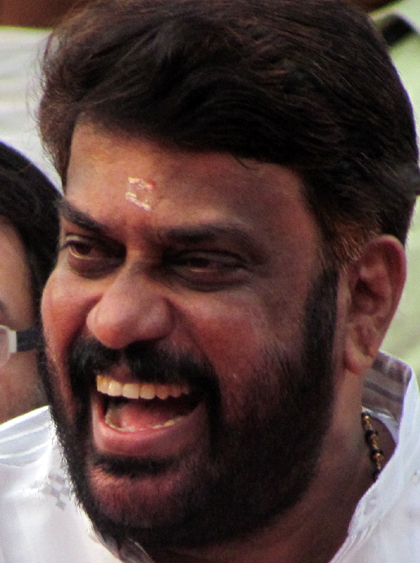
- Born: Haripad, Kerala, India
- Occupation(s): Film director, producer
- Relatives: Navya Nair (niece)

K. Madhu is an Indian film director and producer who works predominantly in the Malayalam film industry. He started his career as an assistant director of prominent film director M.Krishnan Nair. He made his debut with Malarum Kiliyum and has directed over 30 feature films in various languages (Malayalam, Tamil, Telugu & Kannada).

== Filmography ==
Year	Title	Language	Screenwriter
1986	Malarum Kiliyum	Malayalam	
1986	Ee Kaikalil	Malayalam	Kaloor Dennis
1987	Irupatham Noottandu	Malayalam	S. N. Swamy
1988	Oru CBI Diary Kurippu	Malayalam	S. N. Swamy
1988	Oohakachavadam	Malayalam	S. N. Swamy
1988	Moonnam Mura	Malayalam	S. N. Swamy
1989	Adikkurippu	Malayalam	S. N. Swamy
1989	Thalaippu Seithigal	Tamil	
1989	Jagratha	Malayalam	S. N. Swamy
1989	Adhipan	Malayalam	Jagadeesh
1990	Randam Varavu	Malayalam	John Paul
1990	Mounam Sammadham	Tamil	S. N. Swamy
1990	Magaadu	Telugu	S. N. Swamy
1990	Orukkam	Malayalam	Balachandran Chullikkad, John Paul
1991	Adayalam	Malayalam	S. N. Swamy
1992	Kavacham	Malayalam	Sab John
1993	Thalamura	Malayalam	A R Mukhesh
1995	Oru Abhibhashakante Case Diary	Malayalam	S. N. Swamy
1997	Janadhipathyam	Malayalam	A. K. Sajan
1999	Underworld	Kannada	Chinni Krishna
1999	The Godman	Malayalam	Sathish Pathissery
1999	Crime File	Malayalam	A. K. Sajan, A. K. Santhosh
2001	Nariman	Malayalam	S. N. Swamy
2002	Chathurangam	Malayalam	Babu Janardanan
2004	Sethurama Iyer CBI	Malayalam	S. N. Swamy
2005	Nerariyan CBI	Malayalam	S. N. Swamy
2006	Pathaaka	Malayalam	Robin Thirumala
2007	Nadiya Kollappetta Rathri	Malayalam	A. K. Sajan
2009	Rahasya Police	Malayalam	S. N. Swamy
2012	Banking Hours 10 to 4	Malayalam	Sumesh-Amal
2022	CBI 5	Malayalam	S. N. Swamy
