= Kerala Film Critics Association Award for Best Supporting Actor =

Annual Indian film award

The Kerala Film Critics Association Award for Best Supporting Actor is an award presented annually at the Kerala Film Critics Association Awards. It is given in recognise an outstanding performance by a male actor in a supporting role in a Malayalam film. The award was instituted in 2019 and succeeded the Kerala Film Critics Association Award for Second Best Actor which was awarded between the years 1979 and 2018.

The following list includes the winners of both the Best Supporting Actor and Second Best Actor awards.

== Second Best Actor (1979 – 2018) ==
Year	Recipient	Film	Ref.
1979	Balan K. Nair	Aarattu	
1980	Nedumudi Venu	Chamaram	
1981	Bharat Gopy	Kallan Pavithran	
1982	Mammootty	Yavanika	
1983	Babu Namboothiri	Ashtapadi	
1984	Karamana Janardanan Nair	Mukhamukham, Arorumariyathe	
1985	Thilakan	Irakal, Yathra	
1986	Jagathy Sreekumar	Sukhamo Devi, Ennennum Kannettante	
1987	Ashokan	Jaalakam, Ashokante Aswathikuttikku	
1988	T. G. Ravi	1921	
1989	Suresh Gopi	Oru Vadakkan Veeragatha, Vachanam	
1990	Innocent	Gajakesariyogam	
1991	Jagadish	Mukha Chithram, Nettippattom	
1992	Vineeth	Sargam, Daivathinte Vikrithikal	
1993	Vijayaraghavan	Ekalavyan	
1994	Ganesh	Nandini Oppol	
1995	Babu Namboothiri	Kathapurushan	
1996	Biju Menon	Azhakiya Ravanan	
1997	Lal	Kaliyattam	
1998	Lal	Ormacheppu, Kanmadam	
1999	Kalabhavan Mani	Vasanthiyum Lakshmiyum Pinne Njaanum	
2000	Oduvil Unnikrishnan	Oru Cheru Punchiri	
2000	T. S. Raju	Joker	
2001	Rajan P. Dev	Karumadikkuttan	
2002	Prithviraj	Nandanam	
2003	Lalu Alex	Mullavalliyum Thenmavum	
2003	Siddique	Choonda	
2004	Mamukkoya	Perumazhakkalam	
2005	Lal	Thommanum Makkalum, Bungalowil Outha	
2006	Jagathy Sreekumar	Vaasthavam, Palunku, Classmates	
2007	Nedumudi Venu	Thaniye	
2008	Ranjith	Gulmohar	
2009	Pasupathy	Vairam	
2010	Biju Menon	Marykkundoru Kunjaadu, Aagathan	
2011	Anoop Menon	Traffic, Pranayam	
2012	Vineeth	Aattakatha, Bavuttiyude Namathil	
2013	Mukesh	English: An Autumn in London, Vasanthathinte Kanal Vazhikalil	
2014	Nandu	Ottamandaram, Kukkiliyar, Alroopangal	
2015	Prem Prakash	Nirnayakam	
2016	Siddique	Sukhamayirikkatte	
2016	Renji Panicker	Jacobinte Swargarajyam	
2017	Tovino Thomas	Mayaanadhi	
2018	Joju George	Joseph	

== Best Supporting Actor (2019 – present) ==
Year	Recipient	Film	Ref.
2019	Vineeth Sreenivasan	Thanneer Mathan Dinangal	
2020	Sudheesh	Ennivar	
2021	Unni Mukundan	Meppadiyan	
2022	Thampy Antony	Headmaster	
2022	Alencier Ley Lopez	Appan	
