= Kathakku Pinnil =

- Directed by: K. G. George
- Screenplay by: Dennis Joseph
- Story by: K. G. George
- Produced by: Mathew Paulose; Leelamma Paulose
- Starring: Mammootty; Devi Lalitha; Lalu Alex; Thilakan; M. G. Soman
- Cinematography: Venu
- Edited by: M. N. Appu
- Music by: Ouseppachan
- Production company: Merit Enterprises
- Distributed by: Merit Enterprises
- Release date: 16 January 1987
- Country: India
- Language: Malayalam

Kathakku Pinnil (English: Behind the Story) is a 1987 Indian Malayalam crime drama film directed by KG George and scripted by Dennis Joseph, based on the story by George. The film stars Mammootty and Devi Lalitha in lead roles, with Lalu Alex, Thilakan, M. G. Soman and Jagathy Sreekumar appearing in pivotal supporting roles. The film had musical score by Ouseppachan. The plot develops through a woman (Devi Lalitha) narrating her own traumatic life story to a playwright (Mammootty), which is about Vanitha, a young lady trapped by the society into doing a crime she had no choice but to do.

== Plot ==
A. R. Thampi is a famous scriptwriter for Theatre productions. He is married to Malathi and has a daughter with her. Thampi is staying alone at a house, trying to come up with a new idea for a play for Sukumara Pillai, owner of Gayathri Theatres. One night, Vanitha, a beautiful woman clad in a light blue saree runs into his home. She seems to be running from something or someone and is visibly scared. Vanitha begs him to let her stay for the night. She promises to go the next morning. He agrees to her, tired of seeing her beg and provides her with a bed to stay.

The next morning, Thampi is furious seeing that she has not left. She talks to him about her life and he, being the scriptwriter, listens with rapt attention. Slowly, they get to know each other. She tells him her life story. She talks about how she used to live in the lap of luxury with her family. Her father, a business man, married a Christian lady against his family's wishes. They have two children—Vanitha and her brother, Mohan; both are studying. Their father's business goes bankrupt and the troubles at home start. Unable to handle the pressure, her brother turns to drugs. She turns to writing and poems.

One day, her mother walks into their home with a stranger who she claims is the person who provides for them. Angry at her, her father slaps her. She walks out with the stranger, vowing never to return. On the third day of her mother leaving, her father is found dead. He committed suicide. Under pressure to earn for themselves, Vanitha goes to meet Palodan who she remembers used to take money from her father. She is interested to take a job at the local bank. Palodan agrees, but expects return favors from her. Angered, she walks out. They lose their home to debtors of her father. She starts staying at a women's hostel and her brother stays with a friend. There she finds a friend, Geetha and also meets her cousin Priyadarshan. He is a bar singer at Hotel Blue Moon, owned by both Palodan and the character played by Thilakan. Unable to pay rent at the women's hostel, she finally ends up staying at the hotel. In the meantime, she and Priyan get closer. They decide to elope but are caught by the hotel employees. Priyan is beaten unconscious and taken away in a police jeep. She sees all this from the window of the room she is kept locked.

That night, Palodan tries to rape her and she runs out after stabbing him. That is when she runs into Thampi's home. Thampi decides to help out Vanitha by searching if Palodan died from her stabs. He searches for information, attracting attention to himself in the process. Palodan and Co. corner him in a room, but let him go on the condition that his name not be tarnished. In the meantime, Malathi and their daughter arrive at the house Thampi is staying. She sees Vanitha's shadow and makes a big ruckus about it. She goes to meet Pillai and they together come to search for the mysterious woman and her shadow. At that moment, Thampi arrives and asks where Vanitha is. Malathi takes it that he is cheating on her, but he doesn't heed it. He goes to search for her, finally ending up in front of Hotel Blue Moon. The hotel people come searching for Vanitha at Gayathri Theatres, leading to more issues at home of Thampi.

They return dejectedly to the hotel and tasks Priyan to search for her. He finds her and after convincing her to come with him, takes her to the hotel. Thampi sees this and tries to stop them, but he is no match for the hotel employees. There, Palodan and co. try to forcefully strip her and she tries to jump from the building. In a fit of anger and in self-defense, Vanitha kills Priyan. The others run away and at this time, Thampi arrives with the police. Vanitha surrenders. He writes this story into a successful theatre production, ending it with a happy note of how she is acquitted of all charges. But it is shown that life is not always full of happy endings, as she is charged with murder and immoral traffic and is sentenced to life in prison.

== Cast ==
- Mammootty as A. R. Thampi, a playwright
- Devi Lalitha as Vanitha S Nair
- Lalu Alex as Priyadarshan
- Jagathy Sreekumar as Viswambharan
- Thilakan as Kunjipalu
- MG Soman as Palodan
- Nedumudi Venu as Sukumara Pillai
- Kalaranjini as Malathy, Thampi's wife
- Ganesh Kumar as Mohan, Vanitha's brother
- Jessy
- Kalanilayam Omana
- PC George as Thankappan
- P. K. Abraham as Sethumadhavan Nair, Vanitha's father
- Rakhisree as Maggie, a dancer at the hotel
- Soorya as Geetha
- Vishnuprakash as Suresh
- Vijayalakshmi as Vanitha's mother
- Thodupuzha Vasanthi as hostel warden

== Themes ==
Like a bunch of K. G. George's other films, Kathakku Pinnil also deals with the problems faced by women in the society of Kerala. According to critic C. S. Venkiteswaran, in his 2016 article for The Hindu, this film, along with Ee Kanni Koodi, traces "the trajectories of a woman's life in her relationship with man and entanglements with the family and society."

== Soundtrack ==
The songs were composed by Ouseppachan and lyrics were written by ONV Kurup.

No.	Song	Singers	Lyrics	Length (m:ss)
1	Neelakkurinjikal Poothu	KG Markose, Selma George	ONV Kurup	4:19
2	Neelakkurinjikal Poothu	KG Markose	ONV Kurup	4:50
3	Oru Padam Thedi	KS Chithra	ONV Kurup	4:20
