= P. M. Mathew Vellore =

Indian psychologist, columnist, writer, and actor (1933–2020)

- Born: Palakkalthazhe Mathai Mathew; January 31, 1933; Karipuzha, Alappuzha district, Kerala, India
- Died: 28 September 2020 (aged 87); Plamoodu, Thiruvananthapuram, Kerala, India
- Occupations: Psychologist, Writer, Actor
- Spouse: Susy Mathew
- Children: A son and two daughters

Palakkalthazhe Mathai Mathew (January 31, 1933 – 28 September 2020) popularly known as Dr. P. M. Mathew Vellore, was an Indian psychologist, columnist, writer and actor from Kerala, credited with popularizing the subjects of Psychology and Sexology in Kerala. He was known for his clinical service as well as for the several psychology-related articles and columns he wrote in Malayalam periodicals during the last quarter of 20th century. He was also the author of over 20 books and acted in three Malayalam films.

== Biography ==
P. M. Mathew was born in January 1933 at Karipuzha, a small hamlet near Mavelikkara in Alappuzha district of the south Indian state of Kerala. After completing a post-graduate degree in Psychology from the University of Kerala, he secured a doctorate from the same university as well as a diploma in clinical psychology before joining Christian Medical College Vellore where he served as a clinical psychologist and a member of the faculty until 1970. On his return to Kerala, he started a psychiatry clinic in Thiruvananthapuram where he continued clinical practice until his retirement. He also headed the departments of Psychology, Philosophy and Education of the Government of Kerala.

Mathew, who is credited with popularizing Psychology and Sexology in Kerala, wrote over 20 books on psychology which included Dambathya Prashnangal and Manasika Prashnangal and was a prolific columnist during 1970s and 1980s. Rathi Vijnana Kosam, an encyclopedia on sexology, is considered by many as a reference book on the subject in Malayalam language.

He edited two periodicals, Manashasthram and Kudumbajeevitham and was a founding member of Narma Kairali, a humorists' group, based in Thiruvananthapuram. He also acted in three films, Rathri Mazha of Lenin Rajendran, Nizhalkuthu of Adoor Gopalakrishnan and Ee Kanni Koodi of K. G. George.

Mathew was married to Susy and the couple had three children, Sajjan, Raeba and Lola. He was bed-ridden for the last 5 years of his life and died on 28 September 2020, at the age of 87, at his Plamoodu residence in Thiruvananthapuram, due to age-related illnesses.

== Selected bibliography ==
- Vellore, Dr P. M. Mathew. Rathi Vinjana Kosam. Poorna Publications. ISBN 978-8130021423.
- Vellore, Dr P. M. Mathew (14 February 2008). Nammude Kuttikale Engane Valarthanam. DC Books. ASIN B007E5G0LW.
- Vellore, Dr P. M. Mathew (4 March 2004). Kumaree Kumaranmarude Prashnangal. DC Books. ASIN B007E4XBEC.
- Vellore, Dr P. M. Mathew (12 January 2000). Engine Padikkanam Pariksha Ezhuthanam. DC Books. ASIN B007E4WX28.
- Vellore, Dr P. M. Mathew (January 2012). Kudumba Jeevitham. DC Books. ASIN B007E4VIWE.
- Vellore, Dr P. M. Mathew (2007). Paliyal Kalaikalanchiyam (in Tamil). Kalachuvadu Publications. p. 504. ISBN 978-8189359584.
- Vellore, Dr P. M. Mathew (2008). Manassu Oru Kadamkatha. DC Books. ISBN 978-8124018101.
- Vellore, Dr P. M. Mathew. Evergreen Mathayichan. DC Books. ISBN 978-8124017395.
- Vellore, Dr P. M. Mathew. Kudumbajeevitham. DC Books.
- Vellore, Dr P. M. Mathew. Dampathya Prasnangal. DC Books. ISBN 9788183687119.
- Vellore, Dr P. M. Mathew. Vivaha Poorva Bandhangal. DC Books. ISBN 9788183687140.
- Vellore, Dr. P. M. Mathew. Manashanthiku Oru Margarekha. New Horizon Media. ISBN 9788183687126.
- Vellore, Dr P. M. Mathew. Manasika Prashnangal. New Horizon Media Private Limited. ISBN 978-81-8368-713-3.

== Filmography ==
Year	Title	Director
1990	Ee Kanni Koodi	K. G. George
2002	Nizhalkuthu	Adoor Gopalakrishnan
2007	Rathri Mazha	Lenin Rajendran
