= Kolangal =

Kolangal may refer to:

- Kolam, a type of Indian art
- Kolangal (1981 film), an Indian Malayalam-language film directed by K. G. George
- Kolangal (1995 film), an Indian Tamil-language film directed by I. V. Sasi
- Kolangal (TV series), an Indian Tamil-language serial starring Devayani
