= Mukthi =

Mukti
- Poster
- Directed by: I. V. Sasi
- Written by: Lohithadas
- Screenplay by: Lohithadas
- Produced by: Raju Mathew
- Starring: Mammootty; Urvashi; Shobhana; Seema; Thilakan
- Cinematography: V. Jayaram
- Edited by: K. Narayanan
- Production company: Century Films
- Distributed by: Century Films
- Release date: 8 November 1988
- Country: India
- Language: Malayalam

Mukthi (transl. Liberation) is a 1988 Indian Malayalam film, directed by I. V. Sasi and produced by Raju Mathew. The film stars Mammootty, Shobhana, Urvashi and Thilakan in the lead roles. This film was released on October 8, 1988 on the Eve of Diwali

== Plot ==
Coming from a struggling background, former tutorial college teacher Haridasan takes charge as Calicut District Collector with Hameed as ADM and Nambiar as SP. Ravunni Warrier is the helper at his residence. On a visit home, he visits the tutorial where he meets Pillai sir and his daughter Sudharma whom he hopes to marry soon. He visits his modest home and hands over gifts to Amma, his younger brother Sudhi and sister Shobha. His maternal uncle Shekharan who prior to him becoming Collector, had not treated them nicely, visits him with his wife and daughter Radhika who has an affection for Hari. Kunjunni is his second maternal uncle who is a habitual drinker but Hari respects him. Radhamma, a social activist who works in the Beypore fishermen community informs Hari about the police brutality against them. Hari's mother and siblings move over to his residence. Hari looks into the matter of a hotel owned by Vishwanathan which has encroached on government property. Vishwanathan tells his son Vinod to befriend Sudhi and he ends up liking Shobha. When amma puts up the marriage proposal of Radhika, Hari opposes it and expresses his desire to Kunjunni.

Police raid a hotel to find Vinod with Shobha. While Hari and family wonder how to deal with the humiliation, Vishwanathan seeks Shobha's hand in marriage to Vinod with dowry being Hari's marriage to his daughter Jayasree, a modern girl who admires him. With his sister's situation, his mother's and brother's insistence and advice of Hameed to be practical, Hari agrees to it. He then seeks forgiveness from Pillai sir and Sudharma. Among the wedding gifts, Jayasree finds a show-piece of Sati pining for Shiva which makes her doubtful of Hari's past. When Hari finds out Sudhi has been using his name to help an abkari, he rebukes him hard. Sudhi leaves the house challenging to be better than Hari. Shekharan and ammayi tells Sudhi to join his political party. Tensions rise between Hari and Jayasree due to his work commitments and her suspicions. Sudhi becomes youth leader of Shekharan's party that has the Revenue Minister who puts forward the idea of him marrying Radhika and also taking up the Beypore fishermen strife to strengthen his stand. When Jayasree makes Sudharma cry, Hari tells her that their marriage is a charity of Sudharma. Sudhi comes over and takes amma away. As member of district council, Sudhi accuses the Collector of softening his stand on the hotel issue making Hari claim he would take action on RM's orders. Upon Shobha's request, Hari requests Sudhi not to force the RM as it might harm her marriage but he is past caring. Hari and Jayasree decide to separate not legally but for her to stay at hers for some time. Hari attends Sudhi's marriage with Radhika.

Sudhi meets Radhamma to form a new union which she opposes. Sudhi and his followers create a ruckus during temple festival leading to deaths of two Hindus and a Muslim. Hari works hard on the issue and is applauded by the CM. Jayasree comes back to him and both decide to work on their marriage. Sudhi decides to change the temple incident into a communal riot by attacking the mosque which will help to strengthen his party. This is overheard by Radhika who informs it to Hari who tries to solve the matter from all corners possible. When he tells Sudhi he would do anything to get his old Sudhi back, the younger one understands the gravity of the situation he has created. Sudhi tries to stop the protestors but ends up being shot by the police and dies. Despite heavy unrest, Hari and Jayasree goes to his funeral where he is rebuked by his mother and beaten by the villagers and party followers. Kunjunni saves him asking him what good is the job to him. On his way back, Hari visits the tutorial college he once taught in and takes a class watched by Jayasree, Pillai sir and Sudharma.

== Cast ==
- Mammootty as Haridasan IAS, District Collector of Kozhikode
- Urvashi as Sudharma
- Chithra as Jayasree Nair
- Shobhana as Radhika
- Rahman as Sudakaran
- Thilakan as Kunjunni Nair
- Kaviyoor Ponnamma as Madhaviyamma
- Sankaradi as Ravunni Warrier
- Sithara as Sobha
- Babu Namboothiri
- Balan K. Nair as P. K. Nambyar
- Bheeman Raghu
- C. I. Paul
- Ganesh Kumar as Vinod
- Janardanan as Shekharan Nair
- Kundara Johnny
- KPAC Sunny as Thomas Varghese
- M. G. Soman as Hameed
- Seema as Radhamma
- Shivaji
- Thodupuzha Vasanthi
- Jagannatha Varma as Viswanathan Nair

== Crew ==
Dubbing Artist

| Artist | Actor / Actress |
|---|---|
| Sreeja Ravi | Shobhana |
| Bhagyalakshmi | Urvashi |
| Krishnachandran | Rahman |
| Anandavally | Sithara |
| Ambili | Chithra |
| Kottayam Shantha | Seema |
