= M. N. Appu =

Indian film editor

MN Appu
- Occupation: Film editor

MN Appu was a film editor who was active in Malayalam cinema between 1974 and 1990. In a career spanning nearly two decades, he edited more than 25 feature films in Malayalam. He worked predominantly with director KG George, having edited 12 of his movies. He also collaborated with Ramu Kariat, Hariharan, KP Kumaran, Sathyan Anthikkad, and KP Pillai.

He won the Kerala State Film Award for Best Editor twice: for Nellu (1974), which was co-edited with Hrishikesh Mukherjee, and for Yavanika (1982).

In addition, five feature films edited by him—Nellu, Rappadikalude Gatha, Kolangal, Yavanika, and Irakal—have won a total of nine Kerala State Film Awards in various categories. Lekhayude Maranam Oru Flashback was selected for the Indian Panorama category of the International Film Festival of India held in Mumbai. Another film edited by him, Pappan Priyappetta Pappan, has attained a cult following over the years.

== Filmography ==
- Nellu (1974)
- Madhurappathinezhu (1975)
- Rappadikalude Gatha (1978)
- Ashtamudikkaayal (1978)
- Ulkadal (1979)
- Kolangal (1981)
- Yavanika (1982)
- Kaattile Paattu (1982)
- Lekhayude Maranam Oru Flashback (1983)
- Adaminte Vaariyellu (1984)
- Panchavadi Palam (1984)
- Principal Olivil (1985)
- Irakal (1985)
- Puzhayozhukum Vazhi (1985)
- Pappan Priyappetta Pappan (1986)
- Kathakku Pinnil (1987)
- Mattoral (1988)
- Thaala (1988)
- Ee Kanni Koodi (1990)
