= Kerala State Film Award for Best Editor =

Annual Indian film award

The Kerala State Film Award for Best Editor is presented annually at the Kerala State Film Awards of India.

== Winners ==
List of award recipients, showing the year (award ceremony) and film(s)
Year	Recipient(s)	Film(s)	Refs.
1970	Hrishikesh Mukherjee	Priya	
1971	G. Venkitaraman		
1972	M. S. Mani	Maram (film)	
1973	Ravi	Nirmaalyam	
1974	Hrishikesh Mukherjee, M. N. Appu	Nellu	
1975	Suresh Babu	Ekaakini	
1976	K. Narayanan	Anubhavam	
1977	—		
1978	P. Raman Nair	Yaro Oraal; Uthrada Rathri	
1979	Rameshan		
1980	K. Narayanan	Angadi; Orikkalkoodi	
1981	K. Narayanan	Thusharam; Ahimsa	
1982	N. P. Suresh	Ormakaai; Marmaram	
1983	M. N. Appu	Yavanika	
1984	M. S. Mani		
1985	K. Narayanan		
1986	T. R. Sekhar	Onnu Muthal Poojyam Vare	
1987	—	—	
1988	Ravi	Kadaltheerathu	
1989	Venugopal	Alicinte Anweshanam	
1990	B. Lenin	Thazhvaram	
1991	N. Gopalakrishnan	Kilukkam; Abhimanyu	
1992	A. Sreekar Prasad	Yoddha	
1993	B. Lenin & V. T. Vijayan	Sopanam	
1994	G. Murali	Sukrutham	
1995	G. Murali	Sakshyam	
1996	L. Bhoominathan	Kaanaakkinaavu	
1997	L. Bhoominathan	Asuravamsam	
1998	Beena Paul	Daya	
1999	A. Sreekar Prasad	Karunam; Vanaprastham; Jalamarmaram	
2000	Beena Paul	Sayahnam	
2001	A. Sreekar Prasad	Sesham	
2002	B. Ajithkumar	Bhavam; Nizhalkoothu	
2003	Ranjan Abraham	C.I.D. Moosa	
2004	Anthony	4 the People	
2005	A. Sreekar Prasad	Anandabhadram	
2006	L. Bhoominathan	Vaasthavam	
2007	Vinod Sukumaran	Ore Kadal	
2008	Beena Paul	Bioscope	
2009	A. Sreekar Prasad	Pazhassi Raja	
2010	Sobin K. Soman	Pakarnnattam	
2011	Vinod Sukumaran	Ivan Megharoopan	
2012	B. Ajithkumar	Annayum Rasoolum	
2013	K. Rajagopal	Oru Indian Pranayakadha	
2014	Lijo paul	Om Shanti Oshana	
2015	Manoj	Ivide	
2016	B. Ajithkumar	Kammatipaadam	
2017	Appu N. Bhattathiri	Ottamuri Velicham	
2018	Aravind Manmadhan	Oru Njayarazhcha	
2019	Kiran Das	Ishq	
2020	Mahesh Narayanan	C U Soon	
2021	Mahesh Narayanan, Rajesh Rajenndrran	Nayattu	
2022	Nishadh Yusuf	Thallumaala	
2023	Sangeeth Prathap	Little Miss Rawther	
2024	Sooraj E. S	Kishkindha Kaandam	
