= Onappudava =

- Directed by: K. G. George
- Written by: Kakkanadan
- Produced by: Carmel Johny
- Starring: Sharada; Bahadoor; Adoor Bhasi; Sreelatha Namboothiri
- Cinematography: Ramachandra Babu
- Edited by: Ravi
- Music by: M. B. Sreenivasan
- Release date: 27 July 1978
- Country: India
- Language: Malayalam

Onappudava (transl. Onam attire) is a 1978 Indian Malayalam-language film, directed by K. G. George and produced by Carmel Johny. The film stars Sharada, Bahadoor, Adoor Bhasi and Sreelatha Namboothiri. The film has musical score by M. B. Sreenivasan.

== Cast ==
- Sharada
- Bahadoor
- Adoor Bhasi
- Sreelatha Namboothiri
- Cochin Haneefa
- Chandraji
- Sreenivasan
- Mallika Sukumaran
- Pankajavalli
- T. P. Madhavan

== Soundtrack ==
The music was composed by M. B. Sreenivasan with lyrics by O. N. V. Kurup.

No.	Song	Singers	Lyrics	Length (m:ss)
1	"Aavanipponnoonjaalil Aadiva"	Vani Jairam	O. N. V. Kurup	
2	"Kokkarakko Paadum"	Adoor Bhasi	O. N. V. Kurup	
3	"Maarathoru"	Selma George	O. N. V. Kurup	
4	"Shaapashilakalkkuyiru Nalkum"	K. J. Yesudas	O. N. V. Kurup	
