= Nellu (1974 film) =

- Theatrical release poster
- Directed by: Ramu Kariat
- Screenplay by: Ramu Kariat; K. G. George; Dialogue: S. L. Puram Sadanandan
- Based on: Nellu by P. Valsala
- Produced by: N. P. Ali
- Starring: Prem Nazir; Jayabharathi; Mohan
- Cinematography: Balu Mahendra
- Edited by: Hrishikesh Mukherjee; M.N. Appu
- Music by: Salil Chowdhury
- Production company: Jammu Films International
- Release date: 23 August 1974
- Country: India
- Language: Malayalam

Nellu (transl. Paddy) is a 1974 Malayalam-language drama film directed by Ramu Kariat from a screenplay by K. G. George based on the 1972 award-winning novel of the same name by P. Valsala. It features an ensemble cast of Prem Nazir, Jayabharathi, Thikkurissy Sukumaran Nair, Sankaradi and Kottarakkara Sreedharan Nair. The film portrays the life of the Adiyar community, a tribe of the forests in the Wayanad hills of Kerala, through the eyes of an outsider.

In 1972, Kariat approached Valsala for permission to adapt the novel, and when she agreed, he asked K. G. George, S. L. Sadanandan and Valsala to write separate scripts based on the novel and in the end, took certain portions from the three and made the film. Principal photography commenced in 1972 with filming taking place in various villages near Thirunelli in Wayanad. The film has music composed by Salil Chowdhury, cinematography by Balu Mahendra and editing by Hrishikesh Mukherjee and MN Appu.

Nellu was released theatrically on 23 August 1974; it received critical acclaim, primarily for the script and making, and was a box office success, running for more than 100 days in theatres. The film marks the debut of cinematographer Balu Mahendra although not his first release. He won the Kerala State Film Award for Best Photography (Colour). Hrishikesh Mukherjee and Appu won the Kerala State Film Award for Best Editing. The film also won the 1974 Filmfare Award for Best Film - Malayalam.

== Cast ==
- Prem Nazir as Raghavan Nair
- Thikkurissy Sukumaran Nair as Perumal
- Sankaradi as Damoradara Varrier
- Kottarakkara Sreedharan Nair as Chundeli
- Mohan Sharma as Mallan
- Adoor Bhasi as Thapaal Nanu
- Bahadoor as Saidu
- K. P. Ummer as "Vedikkaran" Ouseph
- Kedamangalam Ali as Baddamaran
- Shihab as Ezhuthappottan
- S. P. Pillai as Vaattuvelu (guest appearance)
- Prem Nawas as Unnikrishnan
- J. A. R. Anand as Chathan
- Jayabharathi as Mara
- Kaviyoor Ponnamma as Savithri Varassyar
- Kanakadurga as Kurumatti
- Adoor Bhavani as Pembi
- Rani Chandra as Javani
- K. V. Shanthi
- Sumithra as Safiya
- Chelavoor Krishnankutty
- Innocent
- Shanthi Williams

== Production ==
P. Valsala wrote the novel after a rejuvenating experience in Wayanad. It was published in 1972 by Sahithya Pravarthaka Cooperative Society. It went on to become a best-seller and won the Kumkumam Award for Best Novel in 1973. Kariat approached Valsala for permission to adapt the novel, and when she agreed, he asked K. G. George, S. L. Puram Sadanandan and Valsala to write separate scripts based on the novel.

Noted South Indian actress Sharada was originally chosen for the role of Mara. She turned down the offer when Kariat insisted that she dress like the tribal women of Wayanad. Later, Kariat fixed Jayabharathi, another leading actress of the time, for that role. Nellu marked the debut of actor Mohan Sharma who went on to act in about 100 films in Malayalam. Ramu Kariat was impressed by A View from the Fort, Balu Mahendra's diploma film at the FTII and cast him as the cinematographer of the film.

The film's production occurred at various villages near Thirunelli in Wayanad. It was produced by N. P. Ali under the banner of Jammu Films International.

== Soundtrack ==
All lyrics are written by Vayalar Ramavarma; all music is composed by Salil Chowdhury.

Track listing
| No. | Title | Artist(s) | Length |
|---|---|---|---|
| 1. | "Chemba Chemba" | Manna Dey, P. Jayachandran, Choir |
| 2. | "Kadali Chenkadali" | Lata Mangeshkar |
| 3. | "Neela Ponmane" | K. J. Yesudas, P. Madhuri |
| 4. | "Kaadu Kuliranu (Kalyana Prayathil)" | P. Susheela |

The song " Kadali Chenkadali" was sung by Lata Mangeshkar and is her only song in Malayalam.

== Awards ==
- Filmfare Award for Best Film – Malayalam won by N.P. Ali (1974)
