= Mattoral =

- Theatrical poster
- Directed by: K. G. George
- Screenplay by: C. V. Balakrishnan; K. G. George
- Story by: C. V. Balakrishnan
- Produced by: S. Sankaran Kutty; V. Punnuse
- Starring: Karamana Janardanan Nair; Mammootty; Seema
- Cinematography: Ramachandra Babu
- Edited by: M. N. Appu
- Music by: M. B. Sreenivasan
- Production company: Swapnachithra
- Distributed by: Swapna Release
- Release date: 29 July 1988
- Running time: 150 minutes
- Country: India
- Language: Malayalam

Mattoral (lit.: The Other) is a 1988 Indian Malayalam-language family drama film directed by K. G. George from a story by C. V. Balakrishnan, who co-wrote the screenplay with George. It features Karamana Janardanan Nair, Mammootty, Seema and Urvashi in the lead roles. The plot focuses the life of two couples' Silent treatment and the sudden desertion of a housewife.

M. B. Sreenivasan composed the film's score, while Ramachandra Babu served as the cinematographer. The film was shot in Thiruvananthapuram.

== Plot ==
Kaimal (Karamana Janardanan Nair) and Susheela (Seema) leads a routine married life with two school going children. Kaimal is a straight forward beurocrat while Susheela is a housewife. Balan(Mammootty) and Veni (Urvashi) are a younger couple who are friends with Kaimal and Susheela. One evening Kaimal is shocked to find that Susheela has eloped with another man who turns out to be the local car mechanic, Giri.

Balan tries to convince Susheela to come back, but she moves in with Giri in a dingy room in a shady street. Kaimal is devastated and is struggling to manage kids and facing society. Susheela slowly realizes Giri's womanizing ways as he brings another woman home. Kaimal also has to ward off flirtatious advances of the house maid, Rajamma. Kaimal turns to alcohol and contemplating murdering Susheela. Susheela decides to patch up things with Kaimal. Balan arranges the couple to meet at the beach. However, Kaimal commits suicide before Susheela could reach the beach.

== Cast ==
- Karamana Janardanan Nair as Kaimal
- Seema as Susheela
- Mammootty as Balan
- Urvashi as Veni
- Murali as Mahesh
- Jagathi Sreekumar as Thomas
- Ebin as Giri
- Valsala Menon
- Leela Panicker
- Rajamma
- Latha Thomas
- Suraj
- Rajan Mannarakkayam
- L. Narayanan
- Kala

== Production ==
Principal photography took place in Thiruvananthapuram, with the first shot taken at a car workshop in Thakarapparambu. Mammootty read the script from writer C. V. Balakrishnan only after the initial filming was completed. A scene wherein Mammootty's character hums a song was changed to him singing, after a suggestion by director John Abraham, who while his visit to the film's set sang "Alappuzhakkaran Kesavanaasante", a Kuttanad folk song from there, which was included in the scene as Mammootty singing.

The film is based on a story by author C. V. Balakrishnan, who co-wrote the script, in his film debut. K. G. George had once said, "it was C. V. Balakrishnan's film".

== Critical response ==
In a 2016 article for The Hindu, film critic C. S. Venkiteswaran described the film as "one of the most chilling portrayals of middle class life and the void that men are despite their progressive, civic appearances." In a 2018 critical study article of K. G. George's films, Hindu's Joseph Anthony observed, "If George's women battle jealous, self-indulgent and exploitative men in his other films, in Mattoral they battle a more formidable enemy, the ideal husband — the decent man or the bore."
