= Oolkatal =

- Poster
- Directed by: K. G. George
- Written by: George Onakkoor
- Based on: Ulkadal by George Onakkoor
- Produced by: K. J. Thomas; Dr. George John
- Starring: Venu Nagavally; Sobha; Ratheesh; Jalaja
- Cinematography: Balu Mahendra
- Edited by: M. N. Appu
- Music by: M. B. Sreenivasan
- Production company: Naveenachitra Movie Makers
- Distributed by: Vijaya Movies
- Release date: 26 October 1979
- Country: India
- Language: Malayalam

Oolkatal or Ulkadal (transl. The Bay) is a 1979 Malayalam-language musical-romantic drama film directed by K. G. George and starring Venu Nagavally and Sobha. The film, considered to be the first campus film in Malayalam cinema, was adapted from the novel of the same name by George Onakkoor. It was shot mainly at Mar Ivanios College, Trivandrum.

== Plot ==
The protagonist, Rahulan, loves three different women at different stages of his life. After his childhood love Thulasi commits suicide, Rahulan falls in love with his friend's sister Reena. She hails from an orthodox Christian family and Rahulan never has the courage to approach her father for a marriage proposal. After completing college, Rahulan gets a teacher job. He eventually falls in love with Meera, a rich student of his. Meera's family fixes her marriage with Rahulan. One night, Reena visits Rahulan at his house and at the same time Meera and her father also come by and are shocked to see another woman with Rahulan. In the climax, Rahulan accepts Reena into his life. On the parallel, another romance story is also told, between Davis (Rahulan's friend and Reena's brother), and a nun.

== Cast ==
- Venu Nagavally as Rahulan
- Ratheesh as Davis
- Shobha as Reena
- Jalaja as Susanna
- Jagathy Sreekumar as Shanku
- Thilakan as Rahulan's father
- Suchitra as Meera
- Anuradha as Thulasi
- Sankaradi as Father Chenadan
- P. K. Venukuttan Nair as Reena's father
- Kumudam
- Azeez as Meera's father
- Dr. Namputhiri
- Konniyoor Vijayakumar
- William Dicruz
- Sreemathi George Varghese
- Thrissur Elsy as Meera's mother
- Omanammal
- Jessy
- Shanthi
- Nicemon as child rahulan

== Soundtrack ==
The music was composed by M. B. Sreenivasan with lyrics by O. N. V. Kurup.

Song	Singers
"Ente Kadinjool Pranaya"	K. J. Yesudas, Selma George
"Krishnathulasikkathirukal"	K. J. Yesudas
"Nashtavasanthathin"	K. J. Yesudas
"Puzhayil Mungi Thazhum"	K. J. Yesudas
"Sharadindu Malardeepa"	P. Jayachandran, Selma George
