= Selma George =

- Born: Kochi, Kerala, India
- Genres: Playback singing, Carnatic music
- Occupation: Singer
- Instrument: Vocals
- Years active: 1974–1987
- Label: Audiotracs

Selma George is an Indian film singer in Malayalam cinema during the 1970s. She sang in 40 films, and her most popular song was "Saradindu Malardeepa" from the 1979 film, Ulkadal. She is the daughter of famous singer Pappukutty Bhagavathar. She is a recipient of the Kerala Sangeetha Nataka Akademi Award in the Light Music category (2011).

== Personal life ==
The only daughter of singer Pappukutty Bhagavathar and Baby, she was born at Vyppinkara, Ernakulam. She completed her studies in Carnatic music from the RLV College of Music and Fine Arts, at Tripunithara. Her brother Mohan Jose is an actor in Malayalam movies. She married Malayalam film director K. G. George on 7 February 1977 at the St. Mathias Church in Chennai. They have a son, actor Arun, and a daughter, Thara.

== Filmography ==
Song	Film	Year
Jagadeeshwari Jayajagadeeshwari	Devi Kanyaakumaari	1974
Jagadeeshwari Jayajagadeeshwari [F]	Devi Kanyaakumaari	1974
Pattudayaada	Vrindaavanam	1974
Malayattoor Malayumkeri	Thomasleeha	1975
Maanum Mayilum	Agni Pushpam	1976
Chingakkulirkaatte	Agnipushpam	1976
Pranayamalarkkaavil	Mallanum Mathevanum	1976
Ethethu Ponmalayil	Ozhukkinethire	1976
Paarayidukkil Mannundo	Thulavarsham	1976
Maadathakkili	Thulavarsham	1976
Achan Naaleyorappooppan	Aayiram Janmangal	1976
Gange priya	Kaamalola	1977
Oro Poovum Viriyum Pulari Pon	Vyaamoham	1978
Prethabhoomiyil Naavukal	Iniyaval Urangatte	1978
Maarathoru	Onappudava	1978
Devi Bhagavathi	Mannu	1978
Paadiyathonnum Paattalla	Thurakkoo Oru Vaathil	1978
Pooja Madhuvinu	Soundaryam	1978
Ente kadinjool pranaya	Ulkadal	1979
Sharadindu Malardeepa	Ulkadal	1979
Neelakkuda Choodi Maanam	Mela	1980
Bharatha Muniyoru Kalam Varachu	Yavanika	1982
Machaanethedi	Yavanika	1982
Mookathayude souvarnam	Lekhayude Maranam Oru Flashback	1983
Prabhaamayi	Lekhayude Maranam Oru Flashback	1983
Enneyunarthiya Pularkalathil [Kannillathe Nizhal Paambukal]	Lekhayude Maranam Oru Flashback	1983
Kanneeraattil mungi	Adaaminte Variyellu	1984
Neelakkurinjikal Poothu	Kadhaykku Pinnil	1987
