= Gamanam (1994 film) =

- Directed by: Sreeprakash
- Written by: Siddique, Hamsa
- Produced by: Kareem K.T.H
- Starring: Thilakan, Laksmi
- Cinematography: Ramachandra Babu
- Edited by: L.Bhoominathan
- Music by: Ouseppachan
- Production company: Chaithram Cine Creations
- Distributed by: Gayathri Release
- Release date: 29 November 1994
- Country: India
- Language: Malayalam

Gamanam is a 1994 Indian Malayalam film, directed by Sreeprakash, starring Thilakan and Lakshmi in the lead roles. Thilakan won the Kerala State Award for Best Actor in 1994 for his role of a helpless father.

== Plot ==
Constable Cheriyan who was accused in the murder of his wife's sister is acquitted by court. However his wife Bhanumathi and son Surendran were not ready to accept this verdict and believe that Cheriyan was the real murderer. Cheriyan who is a constable in the police station where Surendran takes charge as SI. Surendran resolves to take revenge on his father while Cheriyan resigns due to the poor treatment from Surendran. Rose the Daughter of Cheriyan still loves her father, despite objections from mother and brother.

Keshavan Nair, a family friend of Cheriyan is empathetic towards Cheriyan and tries to mend the relationships. Advocate Bhasi, friend of Surendran also tries for reconciliation. Meantime, Surendran marries Adv Shyama, daughter of Kesavan Nair while Vinayan comes forward to marry Rose despite knowing her family background. Vinayan is empathetic towards Cheriyan and in their meeting, Cheriyan narrates the mishap that happened to Bhanumathi's sister that led to Cheriyan's conviction. Actually Cheriyan helped Bhanumathi in the past and their relationship ended up in marriage. Bhanumathi's disabled sister was also staying with them. One day when Bhanumathi was out for consulting her gynecologist, her sister was raped and killed by someone and circumstances led to Cheriyan being suspected. Back to present, Bhanumathi applies for a divorce to keep Cheriyan away and on the date of court hearing, the actual killer confesses to Adv.Bhasi, thus making the family to realise their mistake and repent for what they did to Cheriyan. But it was too late and they had to pay a huge price for punishing an innocent Cheriyan.

== Cast ==
- Thilakan as Const.Cheriyachan
- Lakshmi as Bhanumathy
- Baiju as Vinayan
- Vijayakumar as S.I Suredran
- Delhi Ganesh as Keshavan Nair
- K. B. Ganesh Kumar as Adv.Bhasi
- Maathu as Adv. Shyama
- M. S. Thripunithura as H.C Anthapathmanabha Iyyer
- Kuthiravattam Pappu as Const. Kunjuraman
- Sarada Preetha as Rose
- Durga as Bhanumathi's differently abled sister

== Soundtrack ==
The music was composed by Ouseppachan and the lyrics were penned by Bichu Thirumala.

No.	Song	Singers	Lyrics	Length (m:ss)
1.	Kannan Aaraaro	K.J. Yesudas	Bichu Thirumala	
2.	Pavizhavumaai	K.J. Yesudas	Bichu Thirumala	
3.	Peeli Veeshi	K.S. Chithra	Bichu Thirumala	
4.	Kannan Aaraaro	K.S. Chithra	Bichu Thirumala	
5.	Sindhoorappoo Manassil	K.J. Yesudas & K.S. Chithra	Bichu Thirumala	
