= Principal Olivil =

- Theatrical release poster
- Directed by: Gopikrishna
- Written by: Gopikrishna
- Starring: Nedumudi Venu; Bharath Gopi; Menaka; Bhagyalakshmi
- Cinematography: Shaji N. Karun
- Edited by: M. N. Appu
- Music by: Alleppey Ranganath
- Production company: Kanya Films
- Distributed by: Kanya Films
- Release date: 15 February 1985
- Country: India
- Language: Malayalam

Principal Olivil is a 1985 Indian Malayalam-language film written and directed by Gopikrishna and produced by Krishnakumari and K. P. Sasi. The film stars Nedumudi Venu, Bharath Gopi, Menaka and Sukumari. The film's score was composed by Alleppey Ranganath.

== Cast ==
- Nedumudi Venu as MA Babu MA
- Bharath Gopi as Vasavan Pillai
- Menaka as Malathi
- Bhagyalakshmi
- Sukumari as Vasumathi
- Jagathy Sreekumar as Kuttappan
- Adoor Bhasi as Sub Inspector
- V. D. Rajappan as Rajappan
- KPAC Sunny as Adv. Varma
- Kuthiravattam Pappu as Ayyappan
- Meenu as Urmila
- Noohu as Maniyan
- Sabitha Anand as Sreedevi
- Sreenath as Sudheer
- Lathika

== Soundtrack ==
The music was composed by Alleppey Ranganath with lyrics by Bichu Thirumala.

No.	Song	Singers	Lyrics	Length (m:ss)
1	"Kadal Varna Meghame"	K. J. Yesudas	Bichu Thirumala	
2	"Onnaanaam Mala Mamarakkombil"	K. J. Yesudas, K. S. Chithra	Bichu Thirumala	
