= Lekhayude Maranam Oru Flashback =

1983 film by K. G. George

- Poster
- Directed by: K. G. George
- Screenplay by: S. L. Puram Sadanandan
- Story by: K. G. George
- Produced by: Innocent
- Starring: Bharath Gopi; Nalini; Mammootty
- Cinematography: Shaji N. Karun
- Edited by: M. N. Appu
- Music by: M. B. Sreenivasan
- Release date: 12 November 1983
- Running time: 172 minutes
- Country: India
- Language: Malayalam

Lekhayude Maranam Oru Flashback (lit. 'The death of Lekha, a flashback') is a 1983 Malayalam-language film directed by K. G. George and produced by Innocent. The film was controversial because of the protagonist's similarities to the actress Shoba, whose suicide in 1980 was highly publicized. In his biography, George admits that his inspiration to make the movie was indeed the suicide of Shobha, but adds that more importantly it was his long-time dream to make a film about 'cinema', which had never been tried before in the Malayalam industry at the time.

The film was a commercial success. Although it did not receive any of the Kerala state Film awards, it garnered widespread critical acclaim and received awards outside Kerala. It was screened at several movie festivals namely the International Movie festival under the Indian Panorama division held in Bombay and also at the London Film Festival.

== Plot ==
A poor Malayali family reaches Madras to try their luck in the film industry with their daughter Shantamma. She slowly starts climbing the ladder of success and becomes popular actress Lekha. At the peak of her career she commits suicide by hanging herself. The film recounts events that leads to her suicide, including a stint as a prostitute succumbing to the pressure from her parents for the lust of quick money and her unsuccessful love affair with a director.

== Cast ==
- Nalini as Lekha (Voice By Lisy)
- Bharath Gopi as Suresh Babu
- Nedumudi Venu as Paul Raj
- Venu Nagavally as Krishnadas
- Mammootty as Prem Sagar
- Sarada as Geetha
- Meenakumari
- Shubha as Lekha's mother Vishalakshi
- John Varghese as Lekha's Father
- Mohan Jose as Lekha's uncle
- Thodupuzha Vasanthi as Vasanthi
- Ramu
- Thilakan as V. S. Korattur
- Sreenivasan as Movie Director
- Bharathan - cameo appearance
- Ratheesh -cameo appearance

== Soundtrack ==
The music was composed by M. B. Sreenivasan and the lyrics were written by O. N. V. Kurup.

No.	Song	Singers	Lyrics	Length (m:ss)
1	"Enneyunarthiya Pularkalathil" (Kannillathe Nizhal Paambukal)	Selma George	O. N. V. Kurup	
2	"Mookathayude Souvarnam"	Selma George	O. N. V. Kurup	
3	"Prabhaamayi"	P. Jayachandran, Selma George	O. N. V. Kurup	
