= Panchavadi Palam =

1984 Indian film

- Poster
- Directed by: K. G. George
- Screenplay by: K. G. George; Yesudasan (dialogues)
- Based on: Palam Apakadathil by Veloor Krishnankutty
- Produced by: Gandhimati Balan
- Starring: Bharath Gopi; Nedumudi Venu; Sukumari
- Cinematography: Shaji N Karun
- Edited by: M. N. Appu
- Music by: M. B. Sreenivasan
- Distributed by: Gandhimathi Films
- Release date: 28 September 1984
- Running time: 140 minutes
- Country: India
- Language: Malayalam

Panchavadi Palam (transl. Panchavadi bridge) is a 1984 Indian Malayalam-language political satire film written and directed by K. G. George, based on the story Palam Apakadathil (1981) by Veloor Krishnankutty. It stars Bharat Gopy, Nedumudi Venu, Sreenivasan, Jagathy Sreekumar, Sukumari, and Thilakan in the main roles. The film tries to caricature the political scenario in the state of Kerala and portrays the pervasive corruption by politicians.

== Plot ==
A henpecked politician wants his name attached to a new bridge, even if that means destroying another perfectly serviceable bridge. The politician Dussasana Kuruppu is the president of the village. He, along with the other members, tries to demolish the bridge on the advice of a fellow party member, Sikhandi Pillai who is his right-hand man with a crooked mind. The opposition leader Ishak Tharakan makes moves to thwart this and capture the position of the village presidency. As a compromise, both groups agree to relocate the bridge to a distant location, so that not only a new bridge but also a new road will be needed to reach the bridge.

The two tenders, one for a bridge and one for a road, are given to two local contractors. One of the contractors belongs to the ruling party while the other one is supported by the opposition. Ultimately, the bridge is built and opened to the public on the same day of the marriage of Dussasana Kurup's daughter and the bridge contractor. The marriage function is attended by many, including the minister of state for the public works department. Everyone who came for the wedding walks across the bridge, causing it to collapse and killing the crippled Kathavarayan. The film ends by showing the broken bridge in the background.

== Cast ==
- Bharath Gopi as Dushasana Kuruppu
- Nedumudi Venu as Sikhandi Pillai
- Sreevidya as Mandodhari
- Thilakan as Ishak Tharakan
- Sukumari as Rahel
- Jagathy Sreekumar as Habel
- Venu Nagavalli as Jeemuthavahanan
- Sreenivasan as Kathavarayan
- Kalpana as Anarkali
- K. P. Ummer as Jahangir Thatha
- Alummodan as Yudaskunju
- Innocent as Barabas
- V. D. Rajappan as Avarachan Swami
- Shubha as Poothana
- Mohan Jose as Opposition Party Member
- G. V. Anickaden as Opposition Party Member
- N. P. Unnipilla as Jeemuthavahanan's father
- Krishna Prasad as Avarachan's disciple
- N. L. Balakrishnan as Bus Passenger

== Soundtrack ==
The music was composed by M. B. Sreenivasan with lyrics by Chowalloor Krishnankutty.

No.	Song	Singers	Lyrics	Length (m:ss)
1	"Naanayam Kandal"	K. P. Brahmanandan, C. O. Anto	Chowalloor Krishnankutty	
2	"Viplavaveeryam"	Chorus, C. O. Anto	Chowalloor Krishnankutty	

== Production ==
The collapse of the temporary bridge in the climax scene was shot using five cameras. The temporary bridge across the Kumarakom backwaters was built to be fairly strong, so it didn't collapse on its own and had to be physically cut apart by the art director and his team.

== Reception and in popular culture ==
The movie is considered one of the best-ever political satires in the history of the Malayalam film industry. It was also one of the first of its kind of movie in Mollywood. The Palarivattom Flyover Scam has close comparisons with Panchavadi Palam in Kerala's public sphere. The Kerala High Court later compared this incident with Panchavadi Palam.
