= Pappan Priyappetta Pappan =

- Poster
- Directed by: Sathyan Anthikad
- Written by: Siddique–Lal
- Produced by: G. S. Harindran
- Starring: Mohanlal; Rahman; Thilakan; Lissy
- Cinematography: Anandakuttan
- Edited by: M. N. Appu
- Music by: Alleppey Ranganath; Rajamani (assistant)
- Distributed by: Dinny Films
- Release date: 3 January 1986
- Running time: 138 minutes
- Country: India
- Language: Malayalam

Pappan Priyapatta Pappan (transl. Pappan Dear Pappan) is a 1986 Indian Malayalam-language fantasy film directed by Sathyan Anthikad and written by Siddique–Lal. It stars Mohanlal and Rahman in the lead roles with Thilakan, Lissy, Bahadoor, Nedumudi Venu and Rajan P. Dev. This is the debut film of Siddique-Lal duo and Harisree Ashokan. The storyline is similar to the film Heaven Can Wait.

== Plot ==
A singer Pappan is killed in a bike accident, by rival singer Umesh; but Yamaraj the Lord of Death realizes that Pappan had a few more days to live. Yamarajan allows Pappan to enter into bodies of other dead people. He first enters the body of a rich old man, then onto a Robinhood-like thief's body and finally onto CI (police)Devdas' body in a bid to tell his girlfriend Sarina that Pappan is dead, and to look forward to someone else in life.

== Cast ==
- Mohanlal as C.I. Devdas (The body which carries the soul of Pappan)
- Rahman as Padmakumar aka Pappan
- Thilakan as Yamarajan
- Lissy as Sarina
- Nedumudi Venu as Kayikkara Kochappu (The body which carries the soul of Pappan)
- Bahadur as Valyamangalathu Padmanabhan
- Mala Aravindan
- N. F. Varghese as Prabhakaran
- Zainuddin
- Rajan P. Dev as Puli Sankaran
- Innocent as Constable Kuttan
- Sankaradi as Singapore Antappan
- Jose Prakash as Chandra Menon
- Jose as Umesh
- Unnimary as Shantha
- Alummoodan as Chitragupthan
- Kunchan as Kunjan Pillai M.L.A
- Harisree Ashokan
- Priya as Item Dancer
- Meena as Ammini

== Soundtrack ==
The music was composed by Alleppey Ranganath and lyrics were written by R. K. Damodaran and Sathyan Anthikad.

No.	Song	Singers	Lyrics	Length
1	"Allithaamara"	P. Jayachandran	R. K. Damodaran	
2	"Kaalanillakkaalathoru Thalla"	Balagopalan Thampi	R. K. Damodaran	
3	"Puthan Manavaatti"	Chorus, Jency Anthony, Sindhu	R. K. Damodaran	
4	"Shaarike Ennomalppainkilee"	P. Jayachandran	Sathyan Anthikad	

== Release ==
Distributed by Dinny Films, Pappan Priyappetta Pappan was released on 3 January 1986. Upon release, the film was a commercial failure. However, it has over the years attained a cult following. Siddique in an interview with The Times of India told, "At that time Malayalis were not ready to accept death as a suitable subject for humour. It was a movie made a bit ahead of its time,”
