= Asthi =

- Directed by: Ravi
- Written by: Thomas Thomas; Ravi (dialogues)
- Screenplay by: Babu Sait; Ravi
- Produced by: Babu Sait
- Starring: Bharath Gopi; Ambika; Rony Vincent; Thilakan; Vijayan
- Cinematography: Vipin Das
- Edited by: Ravi
- Music by: G. Devarajan
- Production company: Kanmani Films
- Distributed by: Kanmani Films
- Release date: 9 September 1983
- Country: India
- Language: Malayalam

Asthi is a 1983 Indian Malayalam film, co-written, directed, and edited by Ravi and produced by Babu Sait. The film stars Bharath Gopi, Ambika, Rony Vincent and Thilakan in the lead roles. The film is based on Thomas Thomas' novel Vishabhoomikalil Mayangunnavar ("The Ones That Sleep in Poisoned Lands"). The film has musical score by G. Devarajan.

== Plot ==
Two friends, Mohan and Rajashekharan, start their career as base workers in a chemical factory. As Rajashekharan gets promoted to a higher post in the company, their friendship suffers.

== Additional information ==
Shooting was halted after the first schedule for various reasons and resumed only after two years.

== Cast ==
- Bharath Gopi as Mohan
- Ambika as Priyamvada, Rajasekharan's wife
- Rony Vincent as Rajasekharan
- Thilakan as Factory Worker
- Sreenivasan as Gopi
- Vijay Menon as Dileep, Kumaran Nair's son
- Vijayan Karote
- Krishnankutty Nair as Kumaran Nair
- Rajkumar as Krishnamoorthy
- K. P. A. C. Azeez as Govindan
- Iringal Narayani
- P. R. Menon
- Ragini as Saritha
- Subhashini as Elizabeth
- Suchitra as Rajalakshmi

== Soundtrack ==
The music was composed by G. Devarajan and the lyrics were written by Poovachal Khader.

No.	Song	Singers	Lyrics	Length (m:ss)
1	"Ee Nimisham Mooka Nimisham"	P. Madhuri	Poovachal Khader	
2	"Shrinkhalakal Ethra Shrinkhalakal"	K. J. Yesudas	Poovachal Khader	
