= Mela (1980 film) =

1980 film by K. G. George

- Film poster
- Directed by: K. G. George
- Written by: Sreedharan Champad; K. G. George
- Screenplay by: K. G. George; Sreedharan Champad
- Story by: Sreedharan Champad
- Based on: Mela by Sreedharan Champad
- Produced by: Prabhakaran; Saidu Muhammad; VK Sidharthan
- Starring: Raghu; Anjali Naidu; Mammootty
- Cinematography: Ramachandra Babu
- Edited by: Ravi
- Music by: M. B. Sreenivasan
- Production company: Visal Movies
- Distributed by: Visal Movies
- Release date: 5 December 1980
- Running time: 150 minutes
- Country: India
- Language: Malayalam

Mela (transl. Fair) is a 1980 Malayalam-language Indian film directed by K. G. George, starring Raghu, Anjali Naidu, and Mammootty. It is noted for starring the shortest actor (Raghu) as the protagonist and in a full-length character.

== Plot ==
The protagonist, working as a clown in a circus in the town, comes to visit his village. He is looking for a bride for himself. The heroine, a tall lady, gets charmed by the wealth (compared to that of the other villagers) of the protagonist even though he is a dwarf. She agrees to marry him. After getting married, they go to the town to join the circus camp.

The new wife finds a different equation at the circus. Here the clown is a very insignificant figure. She soon gets attracted to a heroic figure in the circus camp—motorcycle stuntsman Vijayan (Mammootty). They appear to be heading for an affair. Some drama follows before the protagonist, the clown, hands over his wife to the stuntsman and commits suicide.

== Cast ==
- Raghu as Govindan Kutty, a circus clown
- Anjali Naidu as Sharada
- Mammootty as Vijayan, a bike jumper in the circus
- Iringal Narayani as the mother of protagonist (Raghu)
- K. G. Pinarayi
- Mohan Elias (Sumesh)
- Sreenivasan as Balan
- Sharaff as Ramesh – Circus Manager
- Bhaskara Kurup

== Soundtrack ==
The music was composed by M. K. Arjunan and M. B. Sreenivasan and the lyrics were written by O. N. V. Kurup and Mullanezhi.

No.	Song	Singers	Lyrics	Length (m:ss)
1	"Jwaalaamukhi" (Bit) (from the film Moham Enna Pakshi)	P. Susheela	O. N. V. Kurup	
2	"Manassoru Maanthrikakkuthirayaay"	K. J. Yesudas	Mullanezhi	
3	"Neelakkuda Choodi Maanam"	Selma George	Mullanezhi	
4	"Shilpakalaa" (Bit) (from the film Moham Enna Pakshi)	K. J. Yesudas	O. N. V. Kurup	
