= Elavamkodu Desam =

- Directed by: K. G. George
- Written by: K. G. George (Story & Screenplay); Sreevaraham Balakrishnan (Dialogues)
- Produced by: Media Club
- Starring: Mammootty; Shruti; Rajeev; Khushbu; Thilakan
- Cinematography: Ramachandra Babu
- Edited by: G. Murali
- Music by: Songs & Score: Vidyasagar; Lyrics: O. N. V. Kurup
- Production company: Media Club Private Limited
- Release date: 8 March 1998
- Country: India
- Language: Malayalam

Elavamkodu Desam is a 1998 Indian Malayalam-language period drama film written and directed by K. G. George. It stars Mammootty and Rajeev, with Khushbu, Thilakan and Babu Namboothiri in major supporting roles. It was the last film of K. G. George.

== Plot ==
Jathavedan is invited to Elavamkodu Desam, a princely state, to treat the queen. He learns that Unikkoman, the wicked king of Elavamkodu Desam, rose to power in a coup and killing the noble king Udayavarman. Unikkoman was an ardent devotee to Kali and performed human sacrifices to appease the goddess and receive unchallengeable power. Meanwhile, Unikkoman's queen Ammalu is tortured in her sleep by seeing the departed souls, including that of her first husband, who comes to torment her. How Jathavedan raises an army to return the crown to its true heir form the crux of the story.

== Cast ==
- Mammootty as Jathavedan
- Shruthi Raj as Nandini, the princess
- Rajeev as Udukoman
- Khushbu as Ammalu, Udukoman's wife
- Thilakan as Mooss Thirumeni
- Babu Namboothiri as Raru Asan
- Jagathy Sreekumar as Kurungodan
- Vakkom Jayalal as Baladevan, the prince
- Spadikam George as Idicheman, Unikkoman's army chief
- Manka Mahesh as Mangalabhai Thampuratti
- Captain Raju as Udayavarma
- Narendra Prasad as Adityan, Unikkoman's uncle and Ammalu's first husband
- Bharath Gopi as Agnisharman, Jathadevan's uncle
- V. K. Sreeraman as Nethran
- Cochin Haneefa
- Subair
- Abu Salim

== Soundtrack ==
The music was composed by Vidyasagar and the lyrics were written by O. N. V. Kurup.

- "Engu Ninnengu Ninnu" (male) - K. J. Yesudas
- "Neram" - K. J. Yesudas
- "Engu Ninnengu Ninnu" (female) - K. S. Chithra
- "Aadukal Meyunna" (female) - K. S. Chithra
- "Engu Ninnengu Ninnu" (duet) - K. J. Yesudas, K. S. Chithra
- "Chembakamalaroli" - K. J. Yesudas, K. S. Chithra
- "Aadukal Meyunna" (male) - Biju Narayanan
- "Iniyente Kunjithathe" - Sujatha Mohan, Arunmozhi, C. O. Anto
