= M. B. Sreenivasan =

Indian composer (1925-1988)

- Sreenivasan in a scene from Kavyamela (1965)
- Born: Manamadurai Balakrishnan Srinivasan; 19 September 1925; Chittoor, Madras Presidency, British India (now in Andhra Pradesh, India)
- Died: 9 March 1988 (aged 62); Lakshadweep, India
- Occupation: Music director
- Spouse: Zahida Kitchlew
- Children: Kabeer Sreenivasan
- Relatives: Saifuddin Kitchlew (father-in-law)

Manamadurai Balakrishnan Sreenivasan (19 September 1925 – 9 March 1988), or MBS, was a South Indian music director who worked mainly in the Malayalam and Tamil film industries.

== Early and personal life ==
He was born to an orthodox Tamil Brahmin family on 19 September 1925 in Chittoor, Andhra Pradesh. He was deeply influenced by his paternal uncle, M. R. Venkataraman, who was a pioneer of the communist movement in Tamil Nadu. He had his schooling at P.S. High School, Chennai. He was actively involved with All India Students’ Federation and the Madras Students’ Organisation during his college days at Madras Presidency College. After independence, he worked in Parliament as private secretary to A.K. Gopalan during which he underwent intensive training in Hindustani and Western classical music. He married Zahida Kitchlew, a Kashmiri Muslim, who was the daughter of the freedom fighter Dr. Saifuddin Kitchlew. They had a son, Kabir.

M. B. Sreenivasan died suddenly of a heart attack while conducting a choir in the Lakshadweep islands on 9 March 1988. His body was later taken to his homeland, and was cremated there. Zahida, his wife, outlived him by 14 years, dying on 23 October 2002. Kabir, who suffered from advanced schizophrenia, died on 4 April 2009.

== Career ==
His acquaintance with Nemai Ghosh, a Bengali director, paved his entry into films. Ghosh and Sreenivasan formed a production company called Kumari Films, with contributions from more than 50 shareholders. Their first film, Paadhai Theriyudhu Paar released in 1960. His first film composition was penned by noted Tamil lyricist, Jayakanthan, for the film. He played a major part in the formation of Indian Peoples Theatre Association (IPTA). MBS and Ghosh co-founded the Cine Musicians’ Union, the first trade union for film workers in south India which ensured spot payment for artists. MBS later established the Film Employees Federation of South India. He also served as the chairman of the Indian Performing Right Society, a non-profit copyright society that works to protect the interests of music composers and lyricists under Indian copyright laws.

He formed the Madras Youth Choir in 1971, which sings Indian choral music, based at Chennai. They released a twin CD Pallupaduvome by Charsur and proposed to release a children's CD Poo Vaenuma that was composed by MBS. He played the lead role in the Tamil movie Agraharathil Kazhutai, directed by John Abraham.

MBS produced many hits in Malayalam films. His style of music involved only minimal orchestration and was noted for its their simple lucidity. He is introduced the legendary singer K. J. Yesudas to the film industry.

== Discography ==
=== Malayalam ===
| Year | Film | Notes |
|---|---|---|
| 1962 | Snehadeepam | |
| 1962 | Puthiya Akasam Puthiya Bhoomi | |
| 1962 | Laila Majnu | Background score only |
| 1962 | Kalpadukal | |
| 1962 | Kannum Karalum | |
| 1962 | Swargarajyam | |
| 1963 | Doctor | Background score only |
| 1963 | Kalayum Kaminiyum | |
| 1963 | Ammaye Kaanaan | Background score only |
| 1964 | Althaara | |
| 1964 | Aadyakiranangal | Background score only |
| 1965 | Shyamala Chechi | Background score only |
| 1966 | Puthri | |
| 1966 | Tharavattamma | Background score only |
| 1967 | Pareeksha | Background score only |
| 1967 | Ramanan | Background score only |
| 1967 | Ollathumathi | Background score only |
| 1968 | Aparadhini | |
| 1968 | Kadal | |
| 1969 | Nurse | |
| 1970 | Madhuvidhu | |
| 1971 | Vimochanasamaram | |
| 1972 | Swayamvaram | Background score only |
| 1972 | Iniyoru Janmam Tharu | |
| 1972 | Prathikaram | |
| 1972 | Vidhyarthikale Ithile Ithile | |
| 1973 | Azhakulla Saleena | Background score only |
| 1973 | Nirmalyam | Background score only |
| 1974 | Kanyakumari | |
| 1974 | Swarnavigraham | |
| 1975 | Prayanam | |
| 1977 | Siva Thandavum | |
| 1978 | Bandhanam | |
| 1978 | Onappudava | |
| 1978 | Ekakini | Background score only |
| 1979 | Oolkatal | |
| 1979 | Idavazhiyile Poocha Minda Poocha | |
| 1979 | Kaivazhikal Piriyumbol | Background score only |
| 1980 | Mela | |
| 1980 | Vilkkanundu Swapnangal | |
| 1980 | Prakriti Manohari | Background score only |
| 1980 | Greeshmam | Background score only |
| 1981 | Aarathi | |
| 1981 | Jalarekha | |
| 1981 | Manassinte Theerthayathra | |
| 1981 | Vida Parayum Munpe | |
| 1981 | Oppol | |
| 1981 | Venal | |
| 1981 | Valarthumrugangal | |
| 1981 | Kolangal | Background score only |
| 1981 | Thrasam | Background score only |
| 1982 | Elippathayam | Background score only |
| 1982 | Yavanika | |
| 1982 | Pokkuveyil | |
| 1982 | Chillu | |
| 1982 | Idavela | |
| 1982 | Ilakkangal | |
| 1982 | Kaattile Paattu | Background score only |
| 1982 | Uvvu | |
| 1982 | Sahyante Makan | Background score only |
| 1982 | Vaarikuzhi | Background score only |
| 1983 | Aashrayam | |
| 1983 | Kathi | |
| 1983 | Lekhayude Maranam Oru Flashback | |
| 1983 | Manju | |
| 1983 | Mounam Vachalam | |
| 1983 | Nimishangal (Yaamam) | |
| 1983 | Rachana | |
| 1983 | Oru Swakaryam | |
| 1983 | Oomana Thinkal | |
| 1983 | Parasparam | |
| 1983 | Rugma | |
| 1983 | Saagaram Santham | |
| 1983 | Prem Nazirine Kanmanilla | Background score only |
| 1984 | Adaminte Vaariyellu | |
| 1984 | Oru Kochu Swapnam | |
| 1984 | Mukhamukham | Background score only |
| 1984 | Thathamme Poocha Poocha | |
| 1984 | Akkare | Background score only |
| 1984 | Panchavadi Palam | |
| 1985 | Ayanam | |
| 1985 | Irakal | Background score only |
| 1986 | Meenamasathile Sooryan | |
| 1986 | Sukhamo Devi | Background score only |
| 1987 | Anantaram | Background score only |
| 1987 | Amrutham Gamaya | Background score only |
| 1987 | Jaalakam | Background score only |
| 1987 | Purushartham | Background score only |
| 1987 | Manivathoorile Aayiram Sivarathrikal | |
| 1987 | Kilippattu | |
| 1987 | Swathi Thirunal | |
| 1988 | Indulekha | |
| 1988 | Mattoral | Background score only |

=== Tamil ===
| Year | Film | Notes | Ref. |
|---|---|---|---|
| 1960 | Paadhai Theriyudhu Paar | | |
| 1972 | Dhakam | | |
| 1975 | Edupaar Kai Pillai | | |
| 1975 | Puthu Vellam | | |
| 1976 | Madhana Maligai | | |
| 1977 | Agraharathil Kazhutai | Background score only | |
| 1983 | Nijangal | | |
| 1989 | Marupakkam | | |

== Awards ==
| Year | Award | Film(s) |
|---|---|---|
| 1987 | National Film Award – Special Jury Award (feature film) (posthumously) | - |
| 1973 | Kerala State Film Award for Best Music Director | Nirmalyam |
| 1978 | Kerala State Film Award for Best Music Director | Bandhanam |
| 1979 | Kerala State Film Award for Best Music Director | Idavazhiyile Poocha Mindappoocha, Ulkkadal |
| 1981 | Kerala State Film Award for Best Music Director | Different Films |
| 1987 | Kerala State Film Award – Special Jury Award | Swathi Thirunal |

== See also ==
- Malayalam Cinema
