= Mohan Jose =

Indian actor

- Born: Kochi, Kerala, India,
- Occupation: Actor
- Years active: 1980–present
- Spouse: Felishya
- Children: 1
- Parents: Pappukutty Bhagavathar; Baby

Mohan Jose is an Indian actor in Malayalam cinema. He has acted in more than 100 films. He came into the movie industry portraying villains and later began acting in different comedy and character roles. He is the son of singer and actor Pappukutty Bhagavathar.

== Career ==
Mohan Jose was a government officer in Bombay. He debuted in Chamaram in 1980. Later he moved to Madras to become a full-time movie actor. Rajavinte Makan, Bhoomiyile Rajakkanmar, New Delhi, Nair Saab, Aye Auto, Lelam, Crime File, Black, Nerariyan CBI, Roudram, and Crazy Gopalan are a few among other Malayalam movies in which he portrayed versatile and inimitable characters.

== Personal life ==
He was born as the eldest son of famous singer Pappukutty Bhagavathar and Baby at Vypin. Playback singer Selma George is his sister. Malayalam film director K. G. George is his brother-in-law. He had his primary education from M.G.M School, Thiruvalla and Santa Cruz High School, Ernakulam District. Mohan Jose married Felishya a beautician by profession, in 1988. The couple has a daughter named Lovna. He lives along with his family in kochi

== Filmography ==
Year	Title	Role	Notes
1980	Chamaram		
1981	Justice Raja	Jagan	
1981	Dhanya		
1981	Yavanika	Danny	
1983	Lekhayude Maranam Oru Flashback	Lekha's uncle	
1984	Panchavadi Palam	Opposition Party Member	
1984	Adaminte Vaariyellu	Chakkunni	
1985	Irakal	Unnunni	
1986	Aayiram Kannukal	Goon	
1986	Rajavinte Makan	Peter	
1986	Nyayavidhi		
1986	Yuvajanotsavam	Pramod	
1987	Vazhiyorakazchakal	Sub Inspector Chandy	
1987	Bhoomiyile Rajakkanmar	Guerilla Chandran	
1987	January Oru Orma		
1987	New Delhi (1987 film)	Appu	
1988	New Delhi		Kannada film
1988	Antima Teerpu		Telugu film
1988	1921	Hakkim	
1988	New Delhi	Johny	Hindi film
1988	Thanthram		
1988	Dhinarathrangal		
1988	Manu Uncle	Security Guard	
1989	Nair Saab	Cadet Jose	
1990	His Highness Abdullah	Chandran Nair	
1990	Appu		
1990	Indrajaalam	Michael	
1990	Aye Auto	Dominic	
1991	Thudar Katha	Police officer	
1991	Cheppu Kilukanna Changathi		
1991	Kadalorakkaattu		
1991	Aanaval Mothiram	Gang member	
1992	Oru Kochu Bhoomikulukkam	Thankamani's husband	
1993	Gandharvam	Prisoner	
1994	Chief Minister K. R. Gowthami	Abdu	
1994	Paalayam	Chellayya	
1995	Indian Military Intelligence	Police officer	
1995	Thacholi Varghese Chekavar		
1995	Agnidevan	Jacob	
1996	Rajaputhran	Police Officer	
1997	Lelam	Keeri Vasavan	
1999	Thachiledathu Chundan	Chenkeeri	
1999	F.I.R.	Basheer	
1999	Vazhunnor	Keeri	
1999	Pathram	Kodupalli Surendran	
1999	Crime File	Rector	
2000	Mark Antony	Ravikuttan	
2000	Kannadikadavathu		
2004	Runway	Paramasivam's assistant	
2004	Black	Mammali	
2005	Udayon	Manthodi Joppan	
2005	Bus Conductor	Thomas Chacko	
2005	Thommanum Makkalum	Pillai	
2005	Kochi Rajavu	Ambbattur Singam	
2005	Nerariyan CBI	Velu	
2005	Thaskara Veeran	Chandy	
2006	Bhargavacharitham Moonam Khandam	Bhargavan's Assistant	
2006	Chess	Vijay's right hand	
2008	Crazy Gopalan	Chacko K.T	
2008	Annan Thampi	Madhavan's brother-in-law	
2008	Roudram	Rajakkad Chellappa	
2009	Chattambinadu	Panickar	
2010	College Days	Manavalan Mathai	
2011	Teja Bhai & Family	Teja's advocate	
2012	Masters	Kelu	
2012	Bavuttiyude Namathil	S.I Josemon	
2013	Daivathinte Swantham Cleetus	S.I Ittichan	
2013	Nadodimannan	Padmanabhan's mother	
2014	Ring Master	Diana's father	
2015	Loham	Kunjumon	
2016	Welcome to Central Jail	Baburaj	
2016	Thoppil Joppan	Retd Police Captain Kunjappan Koshy	
2019	Ganagandharvan	Jacob	
2021	Keshu Ee Veedinte Nadhan	Ex-goon Biju	
2022	Eesho	Jamal	
2026	Law and Order	Mammali	
