= Pappukutty Bhagavathar =

Indian singer and actor (1913–2020)

- Born: C.M. Joseph; 29 March 1913; Vypin, Kingdom of Cochin, British India (present day Ernakulam, Kerala, India)
- Died: 22 June 2020 (aged 107); Palluruthy, Kochi, Ernakulam, Kerala, India
- Occupations: Actor; singer
- Years active: 1949–2020
- Spouse: Baby (m. 1947; died 2017)
- Children: 5 (incl. Selma George and Mohan Jose)
- Parents: Michael; Anna
- Relatives: K. G. George (son-in-law)

Pappukutty Bhagavathar (29 March 1913 – 22 June 2020) was an Indian singer and actor in Malayalam cinema.

== Biography ==
Pappukutty Bhagavathar was born as Joseph on 29 March 1913 to Michael and Anna, at Vypin in the erstwhile Kingdom of Cochin. He was the second of five children.

He had two brothers, Daniel and Varghese and two sisters, Rosy and Valsala. He studied at Government Boys School, Vypin.

He sang for the 2009 released Marykkundoru Kunjaadu at the age of 95, sixty years after he sang his first song for a movie, which made him the oldest Malayali to sing in a film. The song "Entadukke Varum" was a hit. He was married to Baby. They had five children, actor Mohan Jose, playback singer Selma George, Sabu Jose, Shadhi, and Jeevan. His son-in-law K. G. George was a Malayalam movie director. He turned 100 in March 2013. His wife Baby died in 2017.

Bhagavathar died in Kochi in June 2020 at the age of 107 due to an age-related illness.

Bhagavathar was the father of actor Mohan Jose and singer Selma George. The late Malayalam filmmaker K. G. George was his son-in-law.

== Awards ==
- 1991: Kerala Sangeetha Nataka Akademi Award (Drama)
- 1997: Kerala Sangeetha Nataka Akademi Award (Classical Music)
- 2004: Kerala Sangeetha Nataka Akademi Fellowship

== Filmography ==
=== As an actor ===
- Prasanna (1950)
- Sthreehrudayam (1960)
- Oraal Koodi Kallanaayi (1964)
- Sree Guruvayoorappan (1964)
- Shyaamala Chechi (1965)
- Muthalaali (1965)
- Viruthan Shanku (1968)
- Anchusundarikal (1968)
- Kaattukurangu (1969)
- Padicha Kallan (1969)
- Vilakuranja Manushyar (1969)
- Arjun Dennis (Vice Chancellor) (1988)

=== As a playback singer ===
- "Vidhiyude Leela"... Prasanna (1950)
- "Kallane Vazhiyil"... Karutha Kai (1964)
- "Kanne Karale"... Aashaachakram (1973)
- "Entadukke Vannadukkum"... Marykkundoru Kunjaadu (2010)
