= Yavanika =

1982 film

- Poster
- Directed by: K. G. George
- Screenplay by: K. G. George; S. L. Puram Sadanandan (dialogues)
- Story by: K. G. George
- Produced by: Henry
- Starring: Bharath Gopi; Nedumudi Venu; Jalaja; Thilakan; Mammootty
- Cinematography: Ramachandra Babu
- Edited by: M. N. Appu
- Music by: M. B. Sreenivasan
- Distributed by: Apsara Pictures
- Release date: 30 April 1982
- Country: India
- Language: Malayalam

Yavanika (transl. The Curtain) is a 1982 Indian Malayalam-language mystery thriller film written and directed by K. G. George. It stars Bharath Gopi, Mammootty, Nedumudi Venu, and Jalaja. Yavanika is one of George's most celebrated films; it received wide critical acclaim and is regarded by critics as a masterpiece of Malayalam cinema.

== Plot ==
Vakkachan, a critically acclaimed theatre director, runs his drama company, Bhavana Theatres. He and his theatre troupe are preparing to drive to a late-night show. One of the leading performers, Kollappally, arrives late, claiming he had lost his lock and keys and had gone to the town to purchase a new one. They begin their journey.

On the way, they pick up Rohini, a prominent young actress of the troupe. Vakkachan asks Rohini about the whereabouts of the troupe's tabla player, Ayyappan, with whom she lives. Rohini says she does not know where he is and that he had not returned home the previous night. Varunan, the comedian of the troupe, suggests going to enquire at the nearby arrack shop as Ayyappan, a heavy drunkard by nature, might be sleeping over booze. They do not find him there either. So they decide to proceed towards the theatre with the thought that Ayyappan might come there directly on time. But, Ayyappan does not turn up for the show. Thus the drama goes on without the tabla player. Then, the troupe proceeds to a hotel they had booked to stay for the night. The next day's drama performance was scheduled at Pandalam. Since there was no clue about Ayyappan, Chellappan, the manager of the drama company, sends another tabla player Janardhanan as a replacement.

Two weeks later, Vakkachan reports Ayyappan missing at the local police station. CI Jacob Eeraly, an honest and sharp police officer from the crime branch, takes up the investigation and interrogates the troupe members individually. During these interrogations, each member tells their own story of Ayyappan's unfaithful nature, drunkenness, sex drive and violent tendencies. Rohini shares that she has beenliving with Ayyappan against her will. The inspector also discovers that Ayyappan had forcefully snatched—and later sold—a pair of earrings Rohini had bought as a wedding gift for her sister.

A month later when everyone had started to forget about Ayyappan, his dead body along with a broken glass bottle is recovered from a paddy field midway between the company office and Ayyappan's rented house. While looking at the broken bottle with was supposedly used to stab Ayyappan, Jacob finds a pair of keys with the letters "JK" engraved on them. He suspected the initials represent "Joseph Kollappally". The police quietly arrests Kollappally after his theatre performance. On being questioned, Kollappally confesses to that he committed the murder by accident after engaging with Ayyappan during a short duel on the road. But, his confession does not entirely convince the police. Jacob investigates further and retrieves a shard of the glass bottle used as the murder weapon from Ayyappan's rented house where he was staying with Rohini.

The next day, the troupe anxiously awaits Kollappally to join them for a big show, unaware of his arrest. The Governor was the chief guest for the show and the show was scheduled to be held at Thiruvananthapuram city. The police plan to use Kollappally as a ploy to find out whether Rohini had a role in the murder and allowed him to speak to the drama company over telephone to inform them that he will arrive directly at the theatre for the performance in the drama. Kollappally arrives late to the venue and tells Rohini backstage that he has been arrested for murder. Rohini, in a panic, takes the stage and publicly admits to killing Ayyappan.

Rohini confesses the murder to the police and tells them her motive: after Ayyappan had sold her earrings, he taunted Rohini, saying he would trap her sister for his sexual pleasure and ruin her life — as he did to Rohini. His taunts angered her, and she stabbed him. She sought Kollapally's help, and he hid the body in the paddy field.

Following her confession, Rohini and Kollapally are taken into custody by the police. The rest of the troupe silently boards their bus and departs from the scene.

== Cast ==
- Bharath Gopi as Ayyappan, a tabla player and drunkard
- Nedumudi Venu as Balagopalan
- Jalaja as Rohini, the regular female lead role in the plays
- Thilakan as Vakkachan, a critically acclaimed theatre director
- Mammootty as CI Jacob Eeraly, the police officer in charge of the investigation
- Venu Nagavalli as Joseph Kollapally
- Jagathi Sreekumar as Varunan
- Vijayavani as Molly, Jacob Eeraly's wife
- Thodupuzha Vasanthi as Rajamma
- Sreenivasan as Chellapan
- Ashokan as Vishnu, Ayyappan's son
- Mohan Jose as Danny
- Kuttyedathi Vilasini as Ammini

== Production ==
=== Development ===
The film uses the Rashomon effect, a storytelling technique in which different characters provide contradictory interpretations or recollections of the same event.

George comments on the film's development: "I was staying in Madras those days when I got a call from Henry. He told me he was interested in making a Malayalam film with me and asked me if I had any subjects in hand. This led to a meeting at hotel Taj Connemara where I told him about two subjects. This included Adaminte Variyellu and Yavanika. Henry was keen about Yavanika and gave me the go-ahead."

=== Filming ===
The entire shoot was in the suburbs of Vattiyoorkavu in Thiruvananthapuram.

== Release and reception ==
The film was released in four theatres. The response was moderate for the first week, but it later picked up and became both commercial and critical success. Yavanika was released along with Ivan Oru Simham (1982), starring Prem Nazir, but surpassed its box office collection. Film critic Kozhikodan included Yavanika on his list of the ten best Malayalam movies of all time. Premlal of The Cue felt that "Yavanika adhered to the characteristics of mainstream cinema and opened the way for broad possibilities to embrace the theme and characters with complexity, approaching them philosophically and psychologically."

== Accolades ==
Yavanika won three awards at the 1982 Kerala State Film Awards:

- Best Film (shared with Marmaram (1982) directed by Bharathan)
- Best Screenplay – S. L. Puram Sadanandan, K. G. George
- Second Best Actor –Thilakan

The film won one award at the 1982 Kerala Film Critics Association Awards:

- Second Best Actor – Mammootty

== Soundtrack ==
The music was composed by M. B. Sreenivasan.

No.	Song	Singers	Lyricist	Length
1	"Bharatha Muniyoru Kalam Varachu"	K. J. Yesudas and Selma George	O. N. V. Kurup	4:34
2	"Chembaka Pushpa"	K. J. Yesudas	O. N. V. Kurup	3:57
3	"Machaanethedi"	Selma George	M. B. Sreenivasan	1:37
4	"Mizhikalil Nirakathiraayi"	K. J. Yesudas	O. N. V. Kurup	3:26
