= Ee Kanni Koodi =

- Directed by: K. G. George
- Written by: S. Bhasurachandran
- Story by: K. G. George
- Produced by: Ousepachan Vaalakuzhy
- Starring: Sai Kumar; Ashwini; Jagadeesh; Sukumari; Thilakan
- Cinematography: Ramachandra Babu
- Edited by: M. N. Appu
- Music by: Johnson
- Production company: Valakuzhy Films
- Distributed by: Valakuzhy Films
- Release date: 1990
- Running time: 138 minutes
- Country: India
- Language: Malayalam

Ee Kanni Koodi is a 1990 Indian Malayalam-language police procedural drama film directed by K. G. George and produced by Ousepachan Valakuzhy. The film stars Sai Kumar, Ashwini, Sukumari and Thilakan in the lead roles.

== Plot ==
The body of a woman initially known as Kumudam, a sex worker, is discovered at her rented residence by Thomas, a hotel manager, who reports the death to the police. Because of his acquaintance with the victim, Thomas becomes an early suspect in the investigation led by Circle Inspector Raveendran. The inquiry extends to several people connected with the woman, including acquaintances from the Malanad Motel where she had previously stayed. A forensic examination determines that she died from potassium cyanide poisoning and had been involved in a physical struggle before her death. As the investigation progresses, Raveendran questions local businessmen, regular visitors, and a group of college students who had been meeting her, gradually uncovering the circumstances surrounding the crime.

The investigation later reveals that the victim's real identity is Susan Philip. Through witness testimonies, the police reconstruct her troubled past, including her failed marriage to the artist Harshan, her financial hardships, and her exploitation by the financier Charlie during a period of vulnerability. Susan had been trying to support herself while securing a future for her son, Bobby. Raveendran eventually determines that Harshan was responsible for her death. Unable to cope with the collapse of their marriage, the loss of his former life, and his lingering despair, Harshan kills Susan during their final meeting.

== Cast ==
- Sai Kumar as Ravindran
- Ashwini as Susan Philip / Kumudam
- Thilakan as Simon
- Jose Prakash as Philip
- Sukumari as Annamma
- Murali as Vidyadharan
- Sethu Lakshmi as Akkaamma
- Alleppey Ashraf as Anirudhan
- Jagadish as Mani
- Jagannatha Varma as Police Officer
- Shivaji as Thomas
- Rajan P. Dev as Pillai, Head Constable
- Suresh as Charlie
- KPAC Sabu as Kuttappan
- Shyam Mohan as Harshan / Prasad
- P. M. Mathew Vellore As Father
