= Kolangal (1981 film) =

- Directed by: K. G. George
- Written by: P. J. Antony; K. G. George (dialogues)
- Screenplay by: K. G. George
- Produced by: D. Philip; K. T. Varghese
- Starring: Thilakan; Nedumudi Venu; Venu Nagavally; Sreenivasan
- Cinematography: Ramachandra Babu
- Edited by: M. N. Appu
- Music by: M. B. Sreenivasan
- Production company: Falcon Movies
- Distributed by: Falcon Movies
- Release date: 28 August 1981
- Country: India
- Language: Malayalam

Kolangal (transl. "Silhouettes") is a 1981 Indian Malayalam film, directed by K. G. George and produced by D. Philip and K. T. Varghese. The film stars Thilakan, Nedumudi Venu, Venu Nagavally and Sreenivasan in the lead roles. The film is based on the story "Oru Gramathinte Athmavu" by P. J. Antony and depicts life, constraints, and frustrations of people in a central-Travancore fictional village.

== Plot ==
Mariamma and Aliamma are neighbours and enemies. Aliamma's daughter is taken to Madras by their relative under false pretense of getting her a good job but she returns home impregnated.

Mariamma's daughter Kunjamma falls in love with a bangle seller, Cheriyan. But Mariamma rejects their relationship. A parasitic villager, Chacko spreads rumors about Kunjamma's losing her chastity to make her unappealing to potential suitors, and to Kallu Varky.

Paramu is a character who considers women of the village his property, he sees them through vulgar eyes, he is village's peeping tom, and if women refuse his advances he intimidates them and spreads rumors about them to destroy their lives.

Raman Nair is another character of the film that helps the villagers when they need money, when they need land to dwell, and acts as a mediator in their problems. He supports the village in his own ways. However, even his intervention for Cheriyan's and Kunjamma's marriage didn't see success.

In the end when Mariyamma's husband dies and she is vulnerable, Chacko comes with Kallu Varky's proposal for marrying Kunjamma and taking a saviours role. Mariyamma believing Chacko's good intentions marries her off to Kallu Varky. Cheriyan who was temporarily staying in the village, leaves the village after burning down his hut.

== Cast ==
- Thilakan as Kallu Varkky
- Nedumudi Venu as Paramu
- Venu Nagavally as Cheriyan
- Sreenivasan as Keshavan
- Menaka as Kunjamma
- Rajam K. Nair as Chanda Mariya
- Gladis as Eliyama
- Sumangali as Leela
- P. A. Aziz as Kutty Shankaran Nair
- Jagadeesh as Ittupu/Susheel Kumar
- George Cheriyan
- D. Philip
- Annavi Rajan
- Kumudam
- Noohu
- P. A. Latheef
- Rajakumari Venu
- Sarojam
- T. M. Abraham

== Music ==
There are two famous limericks starting "Kaallae nee parishudhan aakunnu" and "Ithino adame ninne njan thottathil aaki" made (using existent Christian folk songs) and sung by Thilakan. Background music was scored by M. B. Sreenivasan

== Awards ==
Rajam K. Nair won the award for second best actress at the annual Kerala State Film Awards.
