= Irakal =

- Directed by: K. G. George
- Written by: K. G. George
- Produced by: Sukumaran
- Starring: K. B. Ganesh Kumar; Thilakan; Sukumaran; Ashokan; Radha
- Cinematography: Venu
- Edited by: M. N. Appu
- Music by: M. B. Sreenivasan
- Production company: M.S. Films
- Distributed by: Gandhimathi Release
- Release date: 17 September 1985
- Country: India
- Language: Malayalam

Irakal (transl. Victims) is a 1985 Indian Malayalam-language psychological thriller film written and directed by K. G. George and produced by Sukumaran. The film stars K. B. Ganesh Kumar, Thilakan, Sukumaran, Ashokan, and Radha. It won two Kerala State Film Awards—Second Best Film, and Best Story. Irakal is considered the first dark movie in Malayalam and is regarded as a classic film.

== Plot ==
A ruthless Syrian Christian rubber baron, Mathews aka Mathukutty, builds an empire through business acumen and greasing palms of cops and labour union leaders. His illegal businesses includes dealing in marijuana and hooch. His son, Koshy, who is the second-in-command in his business and illegal activities, is equally ruthless and violent. His second son, Sunny, is an alcoholic, but a normal guy struggling to get out of his father's stranglehold. He rebels once in a while but is incompetent and lazy to go his own way. Mathukutty's only daughter, Annie, is a nymphomaniac, who has no feelings for her husband Andrews or daughter. Her husband is fed up with her wayward lifestyle. Annie comes to live with her maternal family every month, in the pretense of some fight with her husband, so that she can have sex with Mathukutty's henchman and rubber employee, Unnunni. Mathukutty and Koshy are not aware of Annie's wayward lifestyle and think their son-in-law is unduly suspicious by nature. They mince no words while chastising Annie's husband for being the guilty party in the marriage. Koshy even roughs him up when Andrews refuses to come for a reconciliation meeting.

Mathukkutty's youngest son, Baby, is an engineering student. At college, he fantasises about murder and gushing blood. He shows early signs of antisocial behaviors which manifests itself when ragging a junior (freshman). He strangles a junior student with an electric wire. Baby is suspended from the college and returns home. The junior student is admitted to the hospital in a serious condition. His family gets to know of the incident through a newspaper article and dismisses it as a ragging incident gone bad. Baby always keeps the electric wire in his bag as a memento of the incident. Baby is a marijuana addict and shows no alarming outward symptoms of his mental illness. His uncle, a bishop, senses something wrong with his nephew and cannot get through to him.

Baby observes Annie's affair with Unnunni and decides to murder him. He manages to strangle Ununni to death at the tools shed where Unnunni and Annie meet up. Baby hangs the body to stage a suicide. Upon discovering the body, the family disposes of the body to avoid any police investigation into the unnatural death.

Baby has violent dreams, constantly plays with his father's rifle, and imagines murdering Annie, multiple times, using his electric wire and gun. He likes Nirmala, a village girl from a poor family. Nirmala, a young teenager, keeps him interested and even has sex with him under the shade of coffee shrubs in broad daylight. She loves Baby but is well aware of the caste and class divide between them. Nirmala gets engaged to a local shop owner, Balan. She ends the relationship with Baby. Baby murders Balan by strangling him with his preferred weapon, the electric wire. The murder goes unsolved as Baby removes money from the shop making it look like a robbery gone bad.

Nirmala believes that Baby is behind Balan's death and confronts him when they meet at the river. Baby tries to kill her as well, but Nirmala escapes without knowing his intention. Nirmala's mother fixes her wedding to Raghavan, a rubber tapper and Baby's friend. Baby tries to strangle Raghavan too, but fails in his attempt. Raghavan sees Baby's face when the mask he was wearing comes out and reports it to the police. The cops start searching for Baby, who goes into hiding. While his family tries to find him, he suddenly appears with a revolver. He shoots at Koshy, who confronts him, and his father when he shouts at him to stop. Mathukutty escapes the shot, but Koshy is hit though not fatally. While the scuffle is going on, Baby is shot dead by Mathukkutty, using his rifle. His family, in pursuit of making money, did not realise the animal and danger he was becoming through avoidance of society and them.

== Cast ==
- Thilakan as Mathews / Mathukutty
- K. B. Ganesh Kumar as Baby Mathews
- P. C. George as Koshy Mathews
- Sukumaran as Sunny Mathews
- Kannur Sreelatha as Nancy, Sunny's wife
- Srividya as Annie Mathews/ Annie Andrews
- Nedumudi Venu as Andrews, Annie's husband
- Radha as Nirmala
- Venu Nagavally as Balan
- Ashokan as Raghavan, Baby's friend
- Innocent as Aniyan Pillai
- Bharath Gopi as Bishop Stephen
- Azeez as Ramakrishnan, the police inspector
- Chandran Nair
- Mohan Jose as Unnunni
- Shammi Thilakan as Cyril, Baby's classmate
- Sabu Oommen as Gopan

== Analysis ==
The film is an in-depth exploration of the psychology of violence. Its theme in undertones depicted the political conditions of the country during that time including The Emergency. Indira Gandhi and her son Sanjay Gandhi are symbolically presented by Thilakan and Ganesh respectively in the film, though George didn't say it directly. Film critic K. B. Venu noted similarity between the film's story and the Koodathayi Cyanide Murders case. Some consider Irakal as one of the best works of George. Certain critics cite the 2021 film Joji could have taken inspiration from this film with regards to theme.

== Awards ==
The film won four Kerala State Film Awards for Second Best Film, Second Best Actress for Sreevidya, and Second Best Actor for Thilakan.Best Story for K. G. George. In 2016, George was awarded the Muttathu Varkey Award for writing the screenplay of the film. It was the first time in the history of the prestigious award that a screenplay was chosen to be awarded.
