= Jaalakam =

- Directed by: Harikumar
- Written by: Balachandran Chullikkad
- Screenplay by: Balachandran Chullikkad
- Produced by: M. Chandrika
- Starring: Ashokan; Parvathy Jayaram; M. G. Soman; Srividya; Sukumari; Jagathy Sreekumar; Innocent
- Cinematography: K. G. Jayan
- Edited by: G. Murali
- Music by: M. G. Radhakrishnan
- Production company: Ammu Arts
- Distributed by: Ammu Arts
- Release date: 12 July 1987
- Country: India
- Language: Malayalam

Jaalakam is a 1987 Indian Malayalam-language film directed by Harikumar and produced by M. Chandrika. The film stars Ashokan, Parvathy Jayaram, Srividya, Jagathy Sreekumar and Innocent in the lead roles. The film has musical score by M. G. Radhakrishnan.

== Plot ==
Appu is a wayward college going youth not interested in anything and constantly irritated by his relatives at home and a loner at college. His father works in the military and mother constantly dotes on him to change his ways. His father Vijayan's sister and her husband trick their mother into registering their family home under her sister Savitri's name even if Vijayan had spent his life savings into renovating his house. Appu gets into trouble one day when his professor scolds him for not paying attention in the class. This tiff is capitalized by the right-wing student party members who take Appu under their wings, planning to use his waywardness to their advantage. They are constantly picking troubles with the left-wing party which currently rules the college union. When an ex-student of the college and left activist Menon comes to visit the professor at college, Appu's friends Kuzhiveli and gang oppose this, accusing the professor of favoring the other party. In the ensuing tiff Appu gets angry and manhandles the professor, resulting in him being suspended from college. Vijayan reprimands him severely to which he reacts rather rebelliously, and his mother Lakshmi asks him to leave the house. Angry and upset, he takes refuge in the college hostel.

Eventually his union friends successfully threaten the principal into taking Appu back to college and cancel his suspension. Appu comes back home, tries to mend his ways, and even gets romantically involved with his neighborhood sweetheart Latha. However, Latha backs out of the relationship when a rich expat's alliance comes for her citing Appu's present situation and the disagreement of her family due to the same reasons. Meanwhile, at college Kuzhiveli and gang were looking for a chance to get back at the left-wing group who had trashed one of their gang members earlier. They had done it in retaliation when that person had arranged and bashed up the ex-student and their leader Menon who had earlier came to visit the professor. They take advantage of Appu's mental agony and trick him into a fight with the opposition guys. In the ensuing scuffle Appu accidentally stabs an innocent student in the library, killing him. Appu goes behind bars and Lakshmi dies heart broken. Appu breaks down in front of his father after seeing him at his mother's funeral and goes back to jail.

== Cast ==
- Ashokan as Appu V. Nair
- Parvathy Jayaram as Latha
- Murali as Shivankutty
- M. G. Soman as Vijayan Nair
- Srividya as Lekshmikutty
- Sukumari as Devaki
- Jagathy Sreekumar
- Innocent as Gopikurup
- KPAC Lalitha as Savathri
- Sreenath as Anchal Sasi
- Babu Namboothiri
- Jagadish as Kuzhuveli
- T. P. Madhavan
- Rajam K. Nair

== Soundtrack ==
The music was composed by M. G. Radhakrishnan and the lyrics were written by O. N. V. Kurup. Background Music was composed by M. B. Sreenivasan

No.	Song	Singers	Lyrics	Length (m:ss)
1	"Oru Dalam Maathram"	K. J. Yesudas	O. N. V. Kurup	
2	"Unni Urangaariraro"	K. S. Chithra	O. N. V. Kurup	
