= Thilakan =

Indian actor

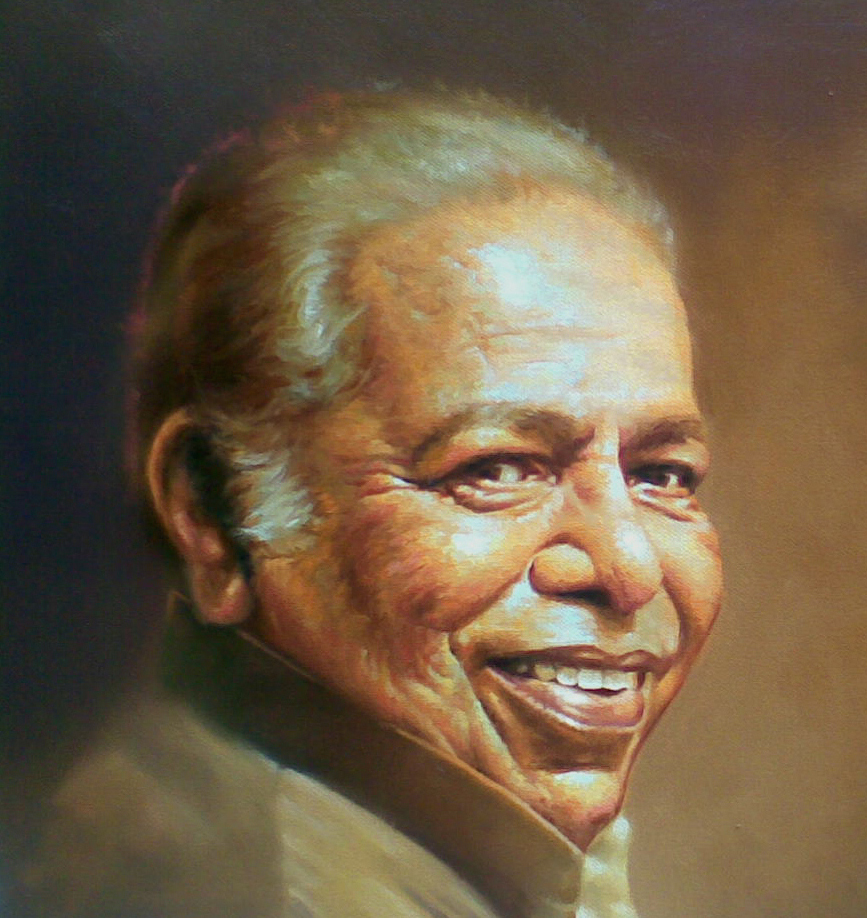
- Born: P. K. Surendranatha Thilakan; 15 July 1935; Aranmula, Travancore State, British Raj (present day Pathanamthitta, Kerala, India)
- Died: 24 September 2012 (aged 77); Thiruvananthapuram, Kerala, India
- Years active: 1956–1978 (stage); 1972, 1979–2012 (film)
- Partner(s): Shantha; Sarojam
- Children: 6 (incl. Shammi and Shobi)
- Parents: Keshavan; Devayani Amma

Palappurathu Keshavan Surendranatha Thilakan (15 July 1935 – 24 September 2012), known mononymously as Thilakan, was an Indian film and stage actor who appeared in over 200 Malayalam films. Spanning more than five decades, Thilakan’s acting career was marked by critical acclaim for his versatility and powerful screen presence. He won several major honours including the Padma Shri (2009) from the Government of India, multiple National Film Awards and numerous Kerala State Film Awards, becoming the most frequent winner of the Kerala State Film Award for Second Best Actor.

Thilakan was known for his elaborate method acting and realistic, spontaneous performances and is widely regarded as one of the greatest actors in Indian cinema, whose style influenced generations of Malayalam actors and audience.

== Early life ==
Thilakan was the second of the six children of P. T. S. Keshavan of the Palappurathu house (1904–1972) and Devayani Amma (1912–2010). Thilakan was born in Ayroor, in the present-day Pathanamthitta district of Kerala. He had his primary education from Asan Pallikoodam, Manikkal and St. Louis Catholic School, Nalamvayal, M. T. Seminary School Kottayam and Sree Narayana College, Kollam.He served in military while Jawaharlal Nehru was the Prime minister before starting his acting career. Thilakan lived in Ayroor until he started acting in films for which he moved to Trivandrum.

Thilakan started his full-time career in acting after leaving college in the year 1956. During this period he and several friends formed a drama troupe called the Mundakayam Nataka Samithy in Mundakayam, where his father was working as an estate supervisor. He worked with the Kerala People's Arts Club till 1966, followed by stints in Kalidasa Kalakendram, Changanacherry Geetha, and P. J. Antony's troupe. He also performed in several radio plays presented by All India Radio.

== Career ==
Thilakan began his career in cinema with a role in the P. J. Antony-directed Malayalam movie Periyar (1973). He then worked in Gandharvakshetram and Ulkadal (1979). His first role as a lead character was as Kallu Varkey, a drunkard in Kolangal (1981). Thilakan was awarded his first Kerala State Film Awards in 1982 for his role in Yavanika. He also won Kerala State Award for supporting actor in Yathra which also starred Mammootty.

In 1988, he received the National Film Award for Best Supporting Actor for his performance in Rithubhedam, and again in 1994. In 1998, he won State awards for Santhanagopalam and Gamanam. He was strongly favored to get another National Film Award for Best Actor for his performance in the movie Perumthachan, but the award was given to Amitabh Bachchan over Thilakan amidst suspicions of strong lobbying, as Amitabh had announced his retirement earlier that year. The film Kireedam was a milestone in Thilakan's career; in this film, he portrayed a helpless policeman silently watching the fate of his son, played by Mohanlal, who was corrupted by society's influences. In 1989 he performed in Mammootty starrer Mrugya, in which his role of a Reverend Father Panangodan was well appreciated by critics and won him many accolades. In the 1990s Thilakan was part of many Mammootty and Mohanlal evergreen hit films. In 1987, he was appreciated for his role in Thaniyavarthanam where he portrayed a man who is the head of a family where his nephew played by Mammootty becomes lunatic due to superstition and lack of awareness of mental health. He was awarded the Second Best Actor for Thaniyavarthanam. In the same year, he also played the comic role of Ananthan Nambiar in the cult-classic comedy movie Nadodikkattu, from which several of Thilakan's lines became very popular. He also starred in the National award winning movie Mathilukal, which was directed by Adoor Gopalakrishnan in which he played the role of a warden of the jail who develops a rapport with the prisoner Vaikom Muhammad Basheer (Mammootty). In 1993, he continued his role as the father of Sethu Madhavan (Mohanlal) in the movie Chenkol. Like its prequel Kireedam, this movie also fared well both commercially and critically. His role as a retired mathematics teacher and headmaster C.P Chacko alias Kaduva Chacko, father of Thomas Chacko alias Aadu Thoma (Mohanlal), in the 1995 blockbuster movie Spadikam was well appreciated by critics and audiences alike. In 1998, he played the role of Dileep's father in the superhit Meenathil Thalikettu, and in his subsequent release he donned the role of a villain in the Kunchako Boban starrer Mayilpeelikavu. In the same year, he was also seen in Chinthavishtayaya Shyamala. Other notable films Thilakan has acted in include Yathra, Mukthi, Kauravar, Moonnam Pakkam, Kilukkam, Namukku Parkkan Munthiri Thoppukal, Mookkilla Rajyathu, Randam Bhavam, Kaattu Kuthira and Yavanika.

He has also acted in other South Indian languages, such as Tamil, Telugu and Kannada.

Thilakan has portrayed a range of characters; however, his most well-known role is that of the father of Mohanlal, portraying a father-son duo. Movies where he donned this role include Kireedam, Spadikam, Narasimham, Evidam Swargamanu, Pavithram and Chenkol. He has also played father roles to other popular actors, including with Mammootty in Sangham, The Truth, Oliyampukal, No. 1 Snehatheeram Bangalore North and Pallavur Devanarayanan, with Jayaram in Veendum Chila Veettu Karyangal and Sandesam, with Kunchacko Boban in Aniyathi Pravu, with Dileep in Punjabi House and Meenathil Thalikettu and with Prithviraj in Sathyam. He has also played a number of antagonists, such as in Randam Bhavam, Karma and Kaalal Pada. He has played comical roles in films like Nadodikkattu and Pattanapravesham (as a coward underworld don), Mookkilla Rajyathu (as a break-out from a mental hospital), Kuttettan (as a pimp) and Naaduvazhikal (as a good-for-nothing, vain person). He is also remembered for the role of comic underworld don Damodarjj in Sanmanassullavarkku Samadhanam. Thilakan played lead roles in Ekantham, Perumthachan, Santhanagopalam, Kaattukuthira, My Dear Muthachan, Mukhamudra (double role), etc.

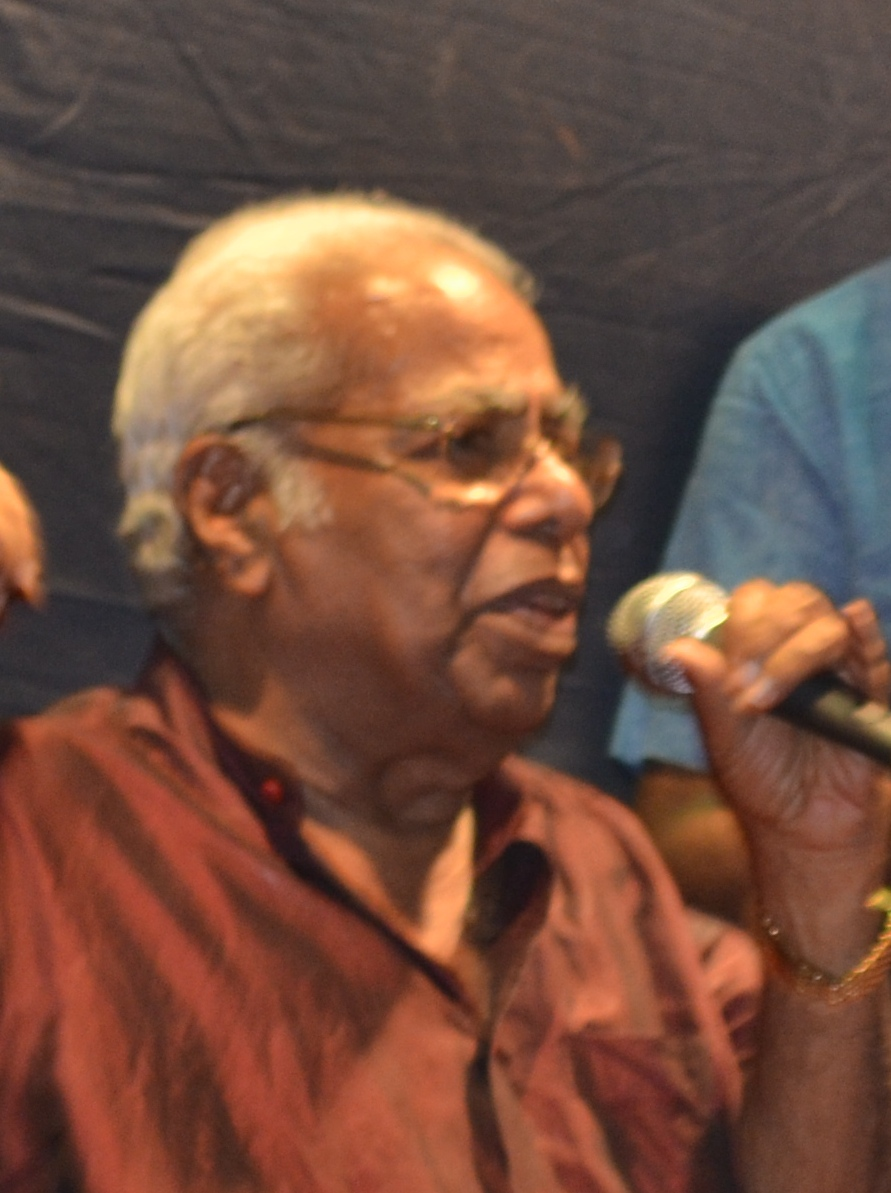
Thilakan at an event

In 2006, he was seen in the Suresh Gopi-Shaji Kailas blockbuster, Chinthamani Kolacase, where he played the father of the title character Chinthamani enacted by Bhavana. In 2007, he acted in Ekantham, for which he received a special mention from the jury. In 2009, he was also seen in Pazhassi Raja, and in the same year he played Mohanlal's father one last time in the actor's 300th movie Evidam Swargamanu. In 2011, he played a significant role in the Prithviraj blockbuster Indian Rupee directed by Renjith. In 2012, he played the role of Kareem Bhai in Ustad Hotel and as the grandfather of Faizy, acted by Dulquer Salmaan.

== Controversies ==
=== National Film Award ===
Thilakan, in an interview, claimed that the then jury chairman Ashok Kumar was keen on giving him the 1991 National Film Award for Best Actor for Perumthachan but that a Congress leader wanted the award to be given to Amitabh Bachchan to woo him back to their party.

=== FEFKA ===
In February 2010, it was reported that the producer of the movie Christian Brothers excluded Thilakan from the film at the request of the Film Employees Federation of Kerala (FEFKA), the predominant film technicians association. Thilakan had been earlier signed for a role in the film. The exclusion was reportedly due to Thilakan acting in a film by director Vinayan, who till recently headed the rival association MACTA. On 3 February 2010, Thilakan publicly protested against the unofficial ban enforced on him by FEFKA and blamed FEFKA for engineering the ban. The Association of Malayalam Movie Artists (AMMA) issued a show cause notice to Thilakan for bringing the issue into the public domain. Thilakan accused AMMA, of which he too is a member. On 20 February 2010 the CPI's trade union wing, AITUC, came out openly in support of Thilakan, while a senior party leader and Rajya Sabha member K. E. Ismail expressed reservations about political involvement in the issue.

Thilakan was originally cast to play a role in a UAE-Indian co-production film Dam 999. He was later replaced following a notice from FEFKA stating that the association would boycott the film if Thilakan were to act. Sohan, the director, was forced to seek a substitute for Thilakan when it "came to the point that shooting might be disrupted." Eventually, Rajit Kapur was cast instead of Thilakan. Some reports contended that Association of Malayalam Movie Artists (AMMA) also had intervened in Thilakan's replacement. In response, Thilakan and his supporters orchestrated a march near the shooting location of the film in Alappuzha.

== Personal life ==
=== Relationships ===
Thilakan's first partner was actress Santha with whom he appeared in several productions. Thilakan and Santha have three sons, Shaji, Shammi & Shobhi. Later, he had a second partner, his co-artist Sarojam with whom he had a son, Shibu Thilakan, and two daughters Dr. Sonia Thilakan and Sophia Ajith.

His grandson Abhimanyu made his debut in Marco (2024) starring Unni Mukundan.

=== Views ===
Thilakan was an atheist throughout his life, and was a supporter of Communist Party. He was a member of many drama troupes which actively promoted Communism in Kerala. When he died, his dead body was draped with Communist flag.

== Death ==
For a long time, Thilakan dealt with numerous health issues like diabetes, hypertension and heart disease. He was hospitalized multiple times due to these problems. Finally, he was admitted to Jubilee Mission Hospital in Thrissur on 1 August 2012 after he collapsed during the shooting of the film Scene Onnu Nammude Veedu. He was then shifted to KIMS Hospital, Thiruvananthapuram, and was in critical condition after suffering two heart attacks. Besides having cardiac problems, Thilakan was suffering from pneumonia. He was put on a ventilator and died on 24 September 2012. He was cremated with full state honours.

== Awards ==
Civilian honours

- 2009 – Padma Shri

National Film Awards:

- 1987 – Best Supporting Actor – Rithubhedam
- 1990 - Special Jury Mention - Perumthachan
- 2006 – Special Jury Mention – Eakantham
- 2012 – Special Jury Mention – Ustad Hotel

Kerala State Film Awards:

- 1981 – Second Best Actor – Yavanika
- 1985 – Second Best Actor – Yathra
- 1986 – Second Best Actor – Panchagni
- 1987 – Second Best Actor – Thaniyavarthanam
- 1988 – Second Best Actor – Mukti, Dhwani
- 1989 – Special Jury Award – Various films
- 1990 – Best Actor – Perunthachan
- 1994 – Best Actor – Gamanam, Santhanagopalam
- 1999 – Second Best Actor – Kattathoru Penpoovu

Filmfare Awards South

- 2006- Filmfare Lifetime Achievement Award - South
- 2011- Best Supporting Actor Male (Indian Rupee)

Other awards

- 2010 – Bharath Gopi Award
- 2007 – Kerala Sangeetha Nataka Akademi Fellowship
- 2001 – Asianet Film Award for Lifetime Achievement

== Filmography ==
=== Malayalam films ===
1970s
Year	Movie	Role	Notes
1972	Periyar		
1972	Gandharavakshetram	Guest at Satheeshan's house	
1979	Ulkadal	Rahulan's father	

1980s
Year	Movie	Role	Notes
1981	Kolangal	Varkey	
1982	Yavanika	Vakkachan	
1982	Chiriyo chiri	Film Producer	
1983	Lekhayude Maranam Oru Flash Back		
1983	Asthi	Factory Worker	
1983	Prem Nazirine Kanmanilla	Home Minister	
1983	Prasnam Gurutharam	Mohan's father	
1983	Ente Mamattikkuttiyammakku	Fr. Joseph Sebastian	
1983	Adaminte Variyellu	Purushothaman Nair	
1984	Panchavadi Palam	Isahak Tharakan	
1984	Oru Kochukatha Aarum Parayatha Katha	Mammukka	
1984	Onnanu Nammal	Sethu's Father	
1984	Koottinilamkili	Devasya	
1984	Engane Undasane		
1984	Arante Mulla Kochu Mulla	Bhargavan Pillai	
1984	Aattuvanchi Ulanjappol	Karunakaran Nair	
1984	Uyarangalil	Police C I	
1985	Vasantha Sena	Unnithan	
1985	Mukhyamanthri		
1985	Akkachide Kunjuvava		
1985	Oru Kuda Keezhil	Kurup	
1985	Katha Ithuvare		
1985	Iniyum Katha Thudarum		
1985	Akalathe Ambili	Kichettan	
1985	Upaharam	Divakaran	
1985	Ambada Njane	Padmanabhan	
1985	Thammil Thammil		
1985	Noketha Doorathu kannum Nattu		
1985	Koodum Thedi	Priest	
1985	Aram + Aram = Kinnaram	M.N.Nambiar	
1985	Anubandham	Menon	
1985	Ayanam	Priest	
1985	Ente Kanakkuyil	Kuttan Nair	
1985	Yathra	Jailor	
1985	Ee Lokam Ivide Kure Manushyar	Krishna Pillai	
1986	Sanmanassullavarkku Samadhanam	Damodar Ji	
1986	Pappan Priyappetta Pappan	Yamarajan	
1986	Akalangalil		
1986	Panchagni	Raman	
1986	Oridathu	Raman	
1986	Namukku Parkkan Munthiri Thoppukal	Paul Pailokkaran, Sofia's stepfather	
1986	Kunjattakilikal	Ayyappan Nair	
1986	Irakal	Mathews / Mathukutty	
1986	Oru Yugasandhya	Shanmugam	
1986	Rareeram	Doctor Tharakan	
1986	Chilambu	Appu Nair	
1986	Ennennum Kannettante	Parameswara Kuruppu	
1986	Ithile Iniyum Varu	Kaimal	
1986	Gandhinagar 2nd Street	Maya's Father	
1986	Ee Kaikalil	Ummachan	
1986	Pranamam	Aparna's Father	
1986	Ennu Nathante Nimmi	Police Inspector	
1987	Kalam Mari Katha Mari	Hameed	
1987	Vrutham	Chacko	
1987	Rithubhetham	Achunni Nair	
1987	Kadhakku Pinnil	Kunjipalu	
1987	Vilambaram	James	
1987	Idanaazhiyil Oru Kaalocha	Father Dennis	
1987	Aalippazhangal	Padmanabhan Thampi	
1987	Sruthi	Aashaan	
1987	Nadodikkattu	Ananthan Nambiar	
1987	Manja Manthrangal	Mathew Paul	
1987	Amrutham Gamaya	Kurup	
1987	Achuvettante Veedu	Damodaran Nair	
1987	Thaniyavarthanam	Balan's Uncle	
1987	Unnikale Oru Katha Parayam	Priest	
1988	Onninu Purake Mattonnu	Velu	
1988	Kanakambarangal	S.I Thomas George	
1988	Mukthi		
1988	Witness	Vikraman Nair	
1988	Pattana Pravesham	Ananthan Nambiar	
1988	Moonnam Pakkam	Thampi a.k.a. Muthachan	
1988	Kudumba Puranam	Sankaran Nair	
1988	Dhwani	Vettukuzhy	
1989	Ammavanu Pattiya Amali	Menon	
1989	Kandathum Kettathum		
1989	Varnam	Major M. K. Nair	
1989	Varavelppu	Labour Officer Ramakrishnan	
1989	Naaduvazhikal	Shankaran	
1989	Kireedam	Achuthan Nair (Sethu's father)	
1989	Varnatheru	Rohini's Father	
1989	Kaalal Pada	Punnoose Punnakkadan / Punnoose Muthalali	
1989	Jaithra Yathra	Prof. Banerjee	
1989	Jathakam	Appukuttan Nair	
1989	Chanakyan	Madhava Menon	
1989	Chakkikotha Chankaran	Raghavan Thampi	
1989	Adharvam	Mekkadan	
1989	Vachanam	Police Officer	

1990s
Year	Movie	Role	Notes
1990	Sasneham	Retired Stationmaster	
1990	Rajavazhcha	Madhava Panikkar	
1990	Radha Madhavam	N. S. Anadapadmanabhan	
1990	Perumthachan	Raman (Perumthachan)	
1990	Maalayogam	Varkey	
1990	Kattukuthira	Kochuvava	
1990	Ee Kannikoodi	Simon	
1990	Mathilukal	Jail Warden	
1990	Oliyampukal	John Mathew	
1991	Venal Kinavukal	Gopalakrishnan Nair	
1991	Sandesam	Raghavan Nair	
1991	Mookilla Rajyathu	Keshavan / Keshu	
1991	Kilukkam	Justice Pillai	
1991	Kadavu		
1991	Godfather	Balaraman (elder son of Anjooran)	
1991	Georgekutty C/O Georgekutty	Ittichan	
1991	Dhanam		
1992	Mukhamudra	Achuthan Pilla & Ananthan Pilla	
1992	Mahanagaram	Kelu writer	
1992	Swaroopam		
1992	Sadayam	Dr. K. V. G. Nambiar	
1992	My Dear Muthachan	Parameswaran / Major K. K. Menon	
1992	Ezhara Ponnana	Madhava Menon	
1992	Daivathinte Vikrithikal	Kumaran	
1992	Kauravar	Aliyaar	
1993	Samagamam	Pallivathukkal Kariyachan	
1993	Bandhukkal Shathrukkal	Damodaran	
1993	Kalippattam	K. MK. Menon	
1993	Ghoshayathra	Moideen Haji	
1993	Aacharyan	Krishna Menon IAS	
1993	Janam	D.G.P Thomas Mathew	
1993	Maya Mayooram	Thanoor Shankunni Menon	
1993	Ente Sreekuttikku	Balakrishnan Nair	
1993	Chenkol	Achuthan Nair (Sethu's father)	
1993	Ammayana Sathyam	R. Varghese Mathew	
1993	Aagneyam	Velu Aashan	
1993	Manichithrathazhu	Pullattuparam Brahmadathan Namboothiripad	
1994	Vendor Daniel State Licency	Vendor Daniel	
1994	Agrajan		
1994	Pavithram	Easwara Pillai	
1994	Pakshe	Vikraman Contractor	
1994	Pingami	Kumaran	
1994	Minnaram	Retd. I. G. Matthews	
1994	Kudumba Visesham	Madhavan Nair	
1994	Kinnaripuzhayoram	Thirusherry Madhavan Vaidyar	
1994	Chukkan	Shankaran Nair	
1994	Gamanam		
1994	Santhanagopalam	Krishna Kurup	
1995	Thacholi Varghese Chekavar	Avarachan	
1995	Sundari Neeyum Sundaran Njanum	Achuthan Nair	
1995	Spadikam	C. P. Chacko alias Kaduva Chacko	
1995	Peter Scott		
1995	Karma	M. R. Sreedhara Menon	
1996	Naalamkettile Nalla Thampimar	I.G Rasheed Khan	
1996	Yuvathurki	Justice T. N. Sharma	
1996	Kathil Oru Kinnaram	Unnithan	
1996	Harbour	Pattalam Pappachan	
1996	Rajaputhran	Balaraman	
1996	Kaanchanam		
1997	Itha Oru Snehagatha		
1997	Kulam	Kudaman Pillai	
1997	Ullasappoonkattu	John Fernandez	
1997	Athyunnathangalil Koodaaram Panithavar		
1997	Ishtadanam		
1997	Aniyathipravu	Raghupal, Sudhi's Father	
1997	Mangamma	Karuppan Mooppar	
1997	Five Star Hospital	Carlos	
1997	Oru Yathramozhi	Adhruman (Abdul Rahiman)	
1997	Nee Varuvolam	Madhavan Nair	
1997	Rishyasringan		
1997	Vaachalam		
1997	Gangothri		
1997	Poonilamazha		
1997	Oral Mathram	Shekhara Menon	
1997	Nagarapuranam	Sathya Narayanan	
1997	Manickakoodaram		
1997	Bhoopathi	Bawa/Chindan	
1997	Kattathoru Penpoovu		
1998	Sidhartha	Raghavan	
1998	Nakshathra Tharattu		
1998	Meenathil Thalikettu	Govindan Nambeesan	
1998	The Truth	Sivapuram Patteri	
1998	British Market		
1998	Punjabi House	Kaimal Master	
1998	Ilamura Thampuran		
1998	Kalapam	Valayar Madhavan	
1998	Mayilpeelikkavu	Valyathan	
1998	Elavamkodu Desam	Mooss	
1998	Chinthavishtayaya Shyamala	Karunan Mash	
1999	Kannezhuthi Pottum Thottu	Natesan Muthalali	
1999	Saphalyam		
1999	Sparsham		
1999	Veendum Chila Veettukaryangal	Kochuthoma	
1999	Thachiledathu Chundan	Vikraman Nair	
1999	Prem Poojari	Music director	
1999	Pallavur Devanarayanan	Pallavur Sreekanta Pothuval	

2000s
Year	Movie	Role	Notes
2000	Narasimham	Justice Maranchery Karunakara Menon	
2000	Ingane Oru Nilapakshi		
2000	Ee Mazha Thenmazha	Narendranath	
2000	Priyam	Priest	
2000	Mazha	Doctor	
2001	Randam Bhavam	Govindji	
2002	Valkannadi	Raghavan	
2002	Kalyanaraman	Meppattu Thirumeni	Guest Role
2003	Kilichundan Mampazham	Chekutty Muthalali	
2003	Malsaram		
2004	Vellinakshatram	Valliyankattu Thirumeni	
2004	Koottu	Dr. Hariharan	
2004	Sathyam	Ayyappan Nair	
2004	Quotation		
2005	OK Chacko Cochin Mumbai	Chacko Bhai	
2005	Isra		
2005	Nerariyan CBI	Kapra	
2005	Mayookham		
2006	Raashtram	Sakhavu Gopalan	
2006	Chinthamani Kolacase	Veeramani Warrier	
2006	Kisan	Muthassan	
2006	Prajapathi	Vellodi	
2006	Kalabham		
2006	Yes Your Honour	Judge Mukundan	
2006	Pakal		
2007	Nagaram	Judge	
2007	Athishayan	Fr. Chanthakkadan	
2007	Pranayakalam		
2007	Eakantham	Achutha Menon	
2007	Black Cat	Moosath	
2008	De Ingottu Nokkiye		
2008	One Way Ticket		
2008	Vilapangalkkappuram	Gopalan	
2008	Aayudham	Madhavan	
2009	Red Chillies	Comrade Maani Varghese	
2009	Makante Achan	K. C. Francis	
2009	Orkkuka Vallappozhum	Sethumadhavan	
2009	Aayirathil Oruvan	Krishnan	
2009	Bharya Swantham Suhruthu	Joseph Madathiparambil	
2009	Kadha, Samvidhanam Kunchakko		
2009	Ee Pattanathil Bhootham		Cameo role
2009	Pazhassi Raja	Kurumbranaadu Raja Veeravarma	
2009	Vairam	Thalikkulam Avarachan	
2009	Kerala Cafe		Segment – Mrityunjayam
2009	Kappal Muthalaali	Yamarajan	
2009	Evidam Swargamanu	Jermias	
2010	Kanmazha Peyyum Munpe		
2010	Drona 2010	Maniyankottu Guptan Namboothiri	
2010	Naayakan	Vincent Karanavar / Vincent Vadakkan	
2010	Sadgamaya		
2010	Yakshiyum Njanum	Narayanji	
2010	Annarakkannanum Thannalayathu		
2011	Achan	Major Madhava Menon	
2011	Kalabha Mazha	Madhava Menon	
2011	Chungakkarum Veshyakalum	Unniyachan	
2011	Raghuvinte Swantham Rasiya	Kuttappan Bhagavathar	
2011	Arabipponnu		
2011	Indian Rupee	Achutha Menon	
2012	Manjadikuru	Appukuttan Nair	
2012	Spirit	Mesthiri	
2012	Koodaram		
2012	Mullamottum Munthiricharum	Vazhakkula Achan	
2012	No. 66 Madhura Bus		
2012	Ustad Hotel	Kareem Ikka / Uppuppa	
2012	Simhasanam	Bishop	
2012	Scene Onnu Nammude Veedu		
2012	Ardhanaari	Nayak	
2013	Yathrakkoduvil	Ravi	
2013	Annum Innum Ennum	Dr. Benjamin Bruno	
2013	Breaking News Live		
2013	Dracula 2012		
2013	August Club	K.P.T. Menon	
2013	God for Sale	Sakhavu Vareeth	
2013	Bangles	Prof. Vincent Chenna Durai	Final Film

=== Tamil films ===
- Sathriyan (1990) as Arumai Nayagam
- Moondrezhuthil En Moochirukkum (1991) as Namboodiri
- Udan Pirappu (1992)
- Kilipetchu Ketkava (1993)
- Karuppu Vellai (1993)
- Ayudha Poojai (1995) as Samiyappan
- Mettukudi (1996)
- Aravindhan (1997)
- Kallazhagar (1999)
- Bala (2002)
- Nee Venunda Chellam (2006) as Viswanathan
- Suyetchai MLA (2006)
- Alibhabha (2008)
- Uyirin Yedai 21 Ayiri (2011)

=== Telugu films ===
- Samarasimha Reddy (1999) as Balakrishna's father
- Sri Mahalakshmi (2007) as Sri Mahalakshmi's father

=== Kannada films ===
- Mother India (1995)

=== As a dubbing artist ===
- 1983 Asthi as the managing director portrayed onscreen by Vijayan Karote
- 2003 Magic Magic 3D – Voice for S. P. Balasubrahmanyam

== Television serials ==
=== TV shows ===
Show (Title)	Network	Directed
Anveshi	DD	
Mannu	DD	
Kadamathathu Kathanar	Asianet	
Swami Ayyappan	Asianet	Suresh Unnithan
Orma	Asianet	K K Rajeev
Sree Ayyappanum Vavarum	Surya TV	
Madhavam	Surya TV	
Peythozhiyaathe	Surya TV	K.K Rajeev
