= Adaminte Vaariyellu =

- Lobby card
- Directed by: K. G. George
- Written by: Kallikad Ramachandran; K. G. George
- Produced by: Vincent Chittilappally
- Starring: Srividya; Suhasini; Venu Nagavalli; Mammootty
- Cinematography: Ramachandra Babu
- Edited by: M. N. Appu
- Music by: M. B. Srinivasan
- Distributed by: Gandhimathi Films
- Release date: 21 April 1984
- Running time: 142 mins
- Country: India
- Language: Malayalam

Adaminte Vaariyellu (transl. Adam's Rib) is a 1984 Indian Malayalam-language film directed and co-written by K. G. George, starring Mammootty, Srividya, Suhasini, and Soorya. The film addresses women's issues and is considered one of the best classics in the Malayalam film industry.

== Synopsis ==
Vasanthi has to care for three generations of her family while also working outside the home to support them. Crushed by poverty, domestic abuse, and overwhelming responsibility, she eventually seeks refuge in a mental institution, where her withdrawal from reality becomes a form of escape from an unbearable life. Alice, trapped in a loveless marriage to a ruthless and manipulating businessman, attempts to find emotional fulfillment through extramarital relationships. When her efforts to gain independence through divorce are rejected, she takes her own life. As both middle-class women turn toward self-destruction in their search for liberation, the third protagonist, Ammini, a poor housemaid subjected to relentless exploitation and neglect, is placed in a women's institution.

In the final part of the film, Ammini emerges as a symbol of resistance and survival. Refusing to accept the confinement and emotional suffocation of institutional life, she inspires the other women to reject their passive roles. Together, they break free from the restrictive environment of the home and leave behind the social structures that have oppressed them. The film concludes with their symbolic journey into freedom, presenting liberation not as a return to conventional society but as a collective rejection of the conditions that denied them dignity, autonomy, and hope.

== Cast ==
- Srividya as Alice
- Soorya as Ammini
- Suhasini as Vasanthy
- Mammootty as Jose
- Venu Nagavally as Gopi
- Bharath Gopi as Mamachan
- Thilakan as Purushothaman Nair
- Mohan Jose as Chakkunni
- Rugmini
- K. Ramachandrababu
- Latheef as Hassan Koya
- Gladis as Saramma
- KPAC Sunny as Eeppachan
- Lalithasree as Ponnamma
- R. K. Nair
- Rajam K. Nair as Gauri
- T. M. Abraham as Verghese
- Sabu Oommen as Mahesh Kumar

== Soundtrack ==
The music was composed by M. B. Sreenivasan and the lyrics were written by O. N. V. Kurup.

Song	Singers	Lyrics
"Kanneeraattil Mungi"	Selma George	O. N. V. Kurup
