= Thodupuzha Vasanthi =

Indian film actress

- Born: P. Vasanthakumari; 1952
- Died: 28 November 2017 (aged 65)
- Occupation: Actress
- Years active: 1975–2017
- Spouse: Rajeendran
- Parents: K. R. Ramakrishnan Nair; P. Pankajakshi Amma

Thodupuzha Vasanthi was an Indian actress who acted mainly in Malayalam films. She appeared in over 450 movies and also in 16 tele-serials and 100 plays. She was a theater artist, before starting with small roles in movies. Her first full-length role was in Kakka in 1982. Some of her most popular films include Yavanika (1982), Poochakkoru Mookkuthi (1984), Nirakkoottu (1985) and Godfather (1991). She was also a dance teacher at Varamani Natyalaya. She underwent treatment for throat cancer before her death on 28 November 2017 at the age of 65.

== Personal life ==
She was born the second of three children to K. R. Ramakrishnan Nair and P. Pankajakshi Amma at Thodupuzha, Mannakkad, Idukki in 1952. Her father was a theater artist and her mother was a dance teacher. She had an elder sister, Radhamani and a younger brother, Suresh Kumar. She studied at Municipal LP School, Manakkad. She started acting in her father's drama troupe "Jayabharath". She became a theater artist while she was studying for her pre-university degree. She began her film career through a dance sequence in Dharmakshetra Kurukshetra in 1975 at the age of 16. She first got a character role in Ente Neelakasham in 1979. Actress Adoor Bhavani added "Thodupuzha" as a prefix to her name while they were acting together for a drama, Penal code. She was noted for her performance in 1982 in the film Alolam. Her last film was Ithu Thaanda Police, released in 2016.

She was married to Rajeendran in 1982. The couple had no children. She managed a dance school named "Varamani Natyalaya". She took a break from acting after her father Ramakrishnan Nair was diagnosed with cancer and died in 2007. She came back with the movie Elsamma enna Annkutty at her husband's urging, but she had to stay away again, due to her husband's death in August 2010 and later because of her mother's death. She also suffered from various ailments. She had been battling throat cancer for some time and was admitted to the hospital at Vazhakulam in Ernakulam district on 24 November 2017 as her condition worsened. She was also suffering from kidney ailment, and one of her legs had to be amputated. She died on 28 November 2017 due to multiple organ failure. Her funeral took place at Thodupuzha.

== Awards ==
- 2012 Kerala Film Critics Association Awards – Chalachithra Prathiba Award
- 1991 Kerala state drama award for her performance in the theater

== Filmography ==
1. Ithu Thaanda Police (2016) as Arundathi's Grandmother
2. Parudeesa (2012) as Thresia's mother
3. Elsamma Enna Aankutty (2010) as Mary Teacher
4. Sketch (2007)
5. Ammathottil (2006)
6. Vesham (2004) as Sivan's mother
7. Kinnara Thumbikal (2000)
8. Moksham (1997)
9. Vamsham (1997) as Kunjannamma
10. Snehasindooram (1997) as Saradha
11. Swantham Makalkku Snehapoorvam (1997)
12. Kireedamillatha Rajakkanmar (1996)
13. Pallivathukkal Thommichen (1996) as Mary
14. Malayala Masam Chingam Onninu (1996) as Rukku's mother
15. Shashinaas (1995)
16. Thirumanassu (1995)
17. Thumbolikadappuram (1995)
18. Vrudhanmare Sookshikkuka (1995)
19. Tharavaadu (Chathurvarnyam) (1994)
20. Sukham Sukhakaram (1994)
21. Ippadikkum Kaadhal (Tamil) (1994)
22. Shudhamaddalam (1994)
23. Varanamalyam (1994)
24. Vakkeel Vasudev (1993) as Jathikka Janu
25. Uppukandam Brothers (1993) as Ananthan Pillai's Wife
26. Aalavattam (1993)
27. Ponnuchami (1993) as Narayani
28. Bandhukkal Sathrukkal (1993) as Charumathi
29. Ponnuchami (1993) as Kanakam's mother
30. Nakshathrakkoodaaram (1992) as Manohar's mother
31. First Bell (1992) as Ayamanam Ammini
32. Maanthrikacheppu (1992) as Padmavathi
33. Pandu Pandoru Rajakumari (1992) as Ammini
34. Radhachakram (1992) as Chanchalakshi
35. Soorya Gayathri (1992) as Nurse
36. Poochakkaru Mani Kettum (1992) as Lakshmikutty
37. Kallanum Polisum (1992) as Narayani
38. Kingini (1992) as Kalyani
39. Sadayam (1992)
40. Avarude Sanketham (1992)
41. Post Box Number 27 (1991)
42. Irikku MD Akathundu (1991) as Suresh's mother
43. Godfather (1991) as Gopinathan's wife
44. Nagarathil Samsara Vishayam (1991) as Bharathi
45. Poonthenaruvi Chuvannu (1991)
46. Mimics Parade (1991)
47. Sundarikakka (1991) as Mary John
48. Innathe Program (1991) as Unni's mother
49. Kuruppinte Kanakkupusthakam (1990) as Rajamma
50. Ee Thanutha Veluppan Kalathu(1990) as Vasudev's mother
51. Pandu Pandoru Rajakumari (1990) as Ammini
52. Arhatha (1990) as Sreenivasan's wife
53. Oliyambukal (1990) as Usha's mother
54. Ammayude Swantham Kunju Mary (1990) as Mariya
55. Anagha (1989)
56. Mahayanam (1989) as Nurse
57. Bhadrachitta (1989)
58. Ammavanu Pattiya Amali (1989)
59. Pooram (1989)
60. Padippura (1989)
61. VIP (1989) as Maheshwari
62. Varnatheru (1989) as Nun
63. Season (1989) as Salomi
64. Unnikrishnante Adyathe Christmas (1988) as Sophia
65. Mrithunjayam (1988) as Robin's mother
66. Puraavrutham (1988)
67. Vellanakalude Nadu (1988) as Soudamini
68. Mukthi (1988) as Radhika's mother
69. Mukunthetta Sumitra Vilikkunnu (1988) as Kumaran's wife
70. Pattanapravesham (1988) as Devaki
71. 1921 (1988)
72. Ithrayum Kaalam (1987) as Ammukutty
73. Kayyethum Doorathu (1987)
74. Mangalya Charthu (1987) as Gracy
75. Kadhakku Pinnil (1987) as Hostel warden
76. Naalkkavala (1987) as Jaanamma
77. Vrutham(1987) as Janaki
78. Chanthayil Choodi Vilkkunna Pennu (1987)
79. Naaradan Keralathil (1987) as Police Constable Saramma
80. Katturumbinum Kaathukuthu (1986)
81. T. P. Balagopalan M.A. (1986)
82. Ponnum Kudthinu Pottu (1986)
83. Aayiram Kannukal (1986) as Hostel warden
84. Adiverukal (1986) as Thresia
85. Doore Doore Oru Koodu Koottam (1986) as Nambiar's wife
86. Iniyum Kurukshetram (1986) as Bhagya Lakshmi
87. Nandi Veendum Varika (1986)
88. Ninnishtam Ennishtam (1986)
89. Sayam Sandhya (1986)
90. Pranamam (1986)
91. Padayani (1986)
92. Oru Katha Oru Nuna Katha (1986)
93. Kochu Themmadi (1986)
94. Kshamichu Ennoru Vakku (1986)
95. Akalangalil (1986) as Nun
96. Niramulla Ravukal (1986) as Saradha's mother
97. Kunjattakilikal (1986) as Madhavi
98. Sanmanassullavarkku Samadhanam (1986) as Ayisha
99. Ilanjippookkal (1986)
100. Kayyum Thalayum Purathidaruthu (1985) as Vanitha Member
101. Ente Ammu Ninte Thulasi Avarude Chakki(1985)
102. Ayanam (1985) as Varkey's wife
103. Nirakkoottu (1985) as Sasikala's co-worker
104. Onningu Vannenkil as Savithriamma
105. Idanilangal (1985) as Jaanu
106. Onnaanaam Kunnil Oradikkunnil (1985) as Shobha's mother
107. Gaayathridevi Ente Amma (1985) as Hostel warden
108. Akkare Ninnoru Maran (1985) as Parvathi
109. Oru Kudakkeezhil (1985) as Saraswathi
110. Anubandham (1985) as Padma
111. Ee Lokam Ivide Kure Manushyar (1985) as Vasumathi
112. Kandu Kandarinju (1985) as Hostel warden
113. Vellarikkaappattanam (1985)
114. Katha Ithuvare (1985)
115. Angadikkappurathu (1985) as Beevi
116. Akkacheede Kunjuvava (1985)
117. Ambada Njaane (1985) as Padmavathi
118. Sreekrishna Parunthu (1984)
119. Enganeyundashaane (1984) as Radhika
120. Aashamsakalode (1984) as Narayani
121. Poochakkoru Mookkuthi (1984) as Kousalya
122. Athirathram (1984)
123. Chakkarayumma (1984) as Nun
124. Raajavembala (1984) as Philomina
125. Koottinilamkili (1984) as Office Staff
126. Odaruthammava Aalariyam (1984)
127. Oru Thettinte Katha (1984)
128. Unaroo (1984)
129. Oru Swakaaryam (1983) as Vasanthi
130. Himavahini (1983) as Hema's sister
131. Karyam Nissaram (1983) as Kumar's sister
132. Iniyenkilum (1983) as Narayani
133. Mouna Raagam (1983) as Devaki/Neena's mother
134. Lekhayude Maranam Oru Flashback (1983) as Vasanthi
135. Sairandri (1983)
136. Novemberinte Nashtam (1982)
137. Idavela (1982)
138. Snehapoorvam Meera (1982) as Saraswathi
139. Njanonnu Parayatte (1982)
140. Alolam (1982) as Janaki
141. Yavanika (1982) as Rajamma
142. Kakka (1982)
143. Theekadal (1980) as Nurse
144. Mr. Michael (1980)
145. Mamankam (1979)
146. Ente Neelakasham (1979)
147. Sukhathine Pinnale (1979)
148. Avalude Prathikaram (1979)
149. Mochanam (1979) as Reetha
150. Ivide Kattinu Sugandam (1979) as Sarojam
151. Kadathanattu Makkam (1978)
152. Sthree Oru Dhukham (1978)
153. Abhinivesham (1977)
154. Kannapanunni (1977)
155. Chennay Valarthiya Kutty (1976)
156. Dharmakshetre Kurukshetre (1975) as Dancer

=== Drama/Dance Dramas ===
- Jnana Sundari
- Sivathandavam
- Nalla Thanka
- Gitopadesham
- Ekalavyan

=== Album ===
- Davudheente Sandhithi

== Television Serials ==
- Muttathi Varkey Kathakal
- Sthree (Asianet)
- Sthree 2
- Sthree 3
- Annankunjinu Thannalayathu (Surya TV)
- Pachupilla Athava Govindan Pilla
