= K. G. George =

Indian film maker and screenwriter (1946–2023)

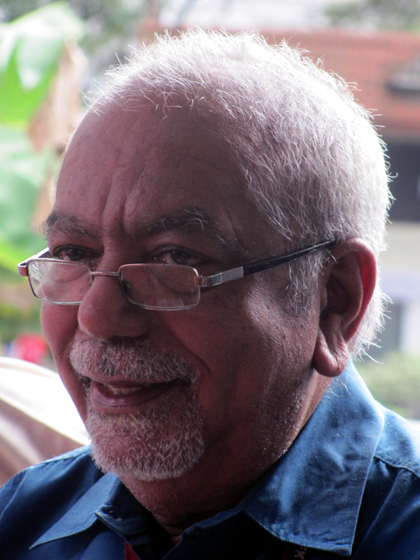
- Born: Kulakkattil Geevarghese George; 24 May 1946; Thiruvalla, Kingdom of Travancore, British India (present day Pathanamthitta, Kerala, India)
- Died: 24 September 2023 (aged 77); Kakkanad, Ernakulam, Kerala, India
- Occupations: Film director; screenwriter
- Years active: 1975–1990; 1998
- Notable work: Kolangal (1981); Yavanika (1982); Panchavadi Palam (1984); Adaminte Variyellu (1984); Irakal (1985)
- Spouse: Selma George
- Children: 2
- Parents: Kulakkattil Geevarghese Samuel; Annamma Samuel
- Relatives: Pappukutty Bhagavathar (Father-in-law); Mohan Jose (Brother-in-law)

Kulakkattil Geevarghese George (24 May 1946 – 24 September 2023) was an Indian filmmaker and screenwriter who worked in the Malayalam cinema. He is considered one of the greatest filmmakers Kerala has ever produced. He was the founder of a new school of film making in Malayalam cinema, along with Bharathan and P. Padmarajan, in the 1980s. He was awarded the J. C. Daniel Award, Government of Kerala's highest honour for contributions to the Malayalam cinema.

George made his debut with Swapnadanam (1975) which won the National Film Award for Best Feature Film in Malayalam. His well-known films include Ulkkadal (1979), Mela (1980), Yavanika (1982), Lekhayude Maranam Oru Flashback (1983), Adaminte Vaariyellu (1983), Panchavadi Palam (1984), Irakal (1986), and Mattoral (1988). He was a recipient of 9 Kerala State Film Awards for his various films.

George was the founder and chairman of the Malayalam Cine Technicians Association (MACTA), and continued to be an executive member. He was the chairman of the Kerala State Film Development Corporation.

== Early life ==
George was born to Annamma and K. Geevarghese Samuel of the Kulakkattil house in Thiruvalla. George got his diploma from Film and Television Institute of India, Pune.

K. G. George started his film career as the assistant to director Ramu Kariat. He made his directorial debut in 1975 with Swapnadanam which made strong presence in the new cinema movement which was active in the early 1970s.

George's stint as an assistant to Kariat in the acclaimed movie Nellu may have influenced his approach to balancing established cinematic conventions with commercially appealing elements. During the 1980s, he was often grouped with directors such as Padmarajan, Bharathan and Mohan, reflecting a perception that their films bridged artistic and mainstream cinema. Many of George's films from this period were commercially successful.

== Film career ==
George's directorial debut, Swapnadanam (1976), was a commercial and critical success. A marital psychodrama, the film departed from several conventions of mainstream Indian cinema, including the use of song-and-dance sequences, while attracting a broad audience. It received the Kerala State Film Award for Best Film.

George's Kolangal (1981) challenged idealized representations of village life by depicting the effects of jealousy and social tensions within a rural Kerala community. Yavanika (1982), a detective thriller set within a travelling drama troupe, explored interpersonal and institutional dynamics behind the scenes of theatrical performance. The film was both commercially successful and critically acclaimed, winning the Kerala State Film Award for Best Film. It also employed a film-within-a-film narrative technique.

Lekhayude Maranam Oru Flashback (1983), which drew comparisons to the life and death of actress Shobha, generated controversy prior to its release. In Adaminte Variyellu (1984), George used a multi-protagonist narrative structure to examine the experiences of three urban women and the constraints imposed by marriage and social expectations.

Based on a short story by Veloor Krishnankutty, Panchavadi Palam (1984) employed satire and exaggerated characterization to comment on political culture and public life. Irakal (1985) focused on violence, power, and moral decline within a wealthy family, exploring the psychological consequences of social and familial dysfunction.

George's final feature film, Elavamkodu Desam, was released in 1998. A period drama, it was released during a period when comedy films influenced by mimicry performances were particularly popular in Malayalam cinema. Reflecting on the film's reception, George later stated that it did not connect with audiences as he had hoped.

Between his directorial debut, Swapnadanam (1976), and his final film Elavamkodu Desam (1998), George directed a body of work that has been regarded as influential in the development of Malayalam cinema. Seven of his films were screened at international film festivals, contributing to his recognition beyond India.

George published his memoir, Flashback: Enteyum Cinemayudeyum, in 2012. In 2018, the documentary 8½ Intercuts: Life and Films of K. G. George, directed by Lijin Jose, was released. The film examines George's life and career, as well as his contributions to Malayalam cinema.

== Death ==
K. G. George died at a retirement home in Kakkanad, on 24 September 2023, at the age of 77. He was undergoing treatment for a stroke.He had been a resident there for the past five years, after suffering from a massive stroke. During the last days of his life, his condition had been much worse, and the end came at 11:00 AM.

== Filmography ==
| Title | Year | Functioned as | | | | | | | | |
| Title | Year | Director | Story | Screenplay | Dialogues | Production | Assistant Director | Associate Director | Actor | Dubbing |
|---|---|---|---|---|---|---|---|---|---|---|
| Faces (FTII student diploma film) | | Yes | | | | | | | | |
| Maaya | 1972 | | | | | | | Yes | | |
| Nellu | 1974 | | | Yes | | | Yes | | | |
| Swapnadanam | 1976 | Yes | | Yes | | | | | | Yes |
| Vyaamoham | 1978 | Yes | | Yes | Yes | | | | | |
| Rappadikalude Gatha | 1978 | Yes | | | | | | | | |
| Iniyaval Urangatte | 1978 | Yes | | Yes | Yes | | | | | |
| Onappudava | 1978 | Yes | | | | | | | | |
| Mannu | 1978 | Yes | | | | | | | | |
| Ulkkadal | 1979 | Yes | | Yes | | | | | | |
| Mela | 1980 | Yes | Yes | Yes | Yes | | | | | |
| Kolangal | 1981 | Yes | | Yes | Yes | | | | | |
| Yavanika | 1982 | Yes | Yes | Yes | | | | | | |
| Lekhayude Maranam Oru Flashback | 1983 | Yes | Yes | Yes | | | | | | |
| Adaminte Vaariyellu | 1984 | Yes | Yes | Yes | Yes | | | | Yes | |
| Panchavadi Palam | 1984 | Yes | | Yes | | | | | | |
| Irakal | 1985 | Yes | Yes | Yes | Yes | | | | | |
| Kathakku Pinnil | 1987 | Yes | Yes | | | | | | | |
| Mattoral | 1988 | Yes | | Yes | Yes | | | | | |
| Yaathrayude Anthyam | 1989 | Yes | | Yes | Yes | | | | | |
| Ee Kanni Koodi | 1990 | Yes | Yes | Yes | Yes | | | | | |
| Mahanagaram | 1992 | | | | | Yes | | | | |
| Elavamkodu Desam | 1998 | Yes | Yes | Yes | | | | | | |

== Awards ==
Kerala State Film Awards:

- 1975 – Best Film – Swapnadanam
- 1975 – Best Screen Play – Swapnadanam
- 1978 – Kerala State Film Award for Best film with popular appeal and aesthetic value – Rappadikalude Gatha
- 1982 – Best Film – Yavanika
- 1982 – Best Story – Yavanika
- 1983 – Second Best Film – Adaminte Variyellu
- 1983 – Best Story – Adaminte Variyellu
- 1985 – Second Best Film – Irakal
- 1985 – Best Story – Irakal
- 2015 – J. C. Daniel Award (instituted by the Kerala state government, for his lifelong contributions to cinema)

Kerala Film Critics Association Awards:

- 1982 – Best Film – Yavanika
- 1982 – Best Director – Yavanika
- 1985 – Best Director – Irakal
- 1985 – Second Best Film – Irakal
- 1987 – Second Best Film – Mattoral
- 2014 – Chalachitra Ratnam Award

Other awards:

- 1976 – Filmfare Special Award - South for Special Commendation Award for Swapnadanam
- 2015 – Master's Award from Film Employees Federation of Kerala (FEFKA)
- 2015 – Indywood Golden Frame Award for Lifetime achievement (ALIIFF)
- 2016 – Muttathu Varkey Award - Irakal
- 2017 – Vanitha Film Awards – Lifetime Achievement Award
- 2017 – CPC Cine Awards – Special Honorary Award
