= Mammootty filmography =

List of performances by Indian actor Mammootty

Mammootty Filmography
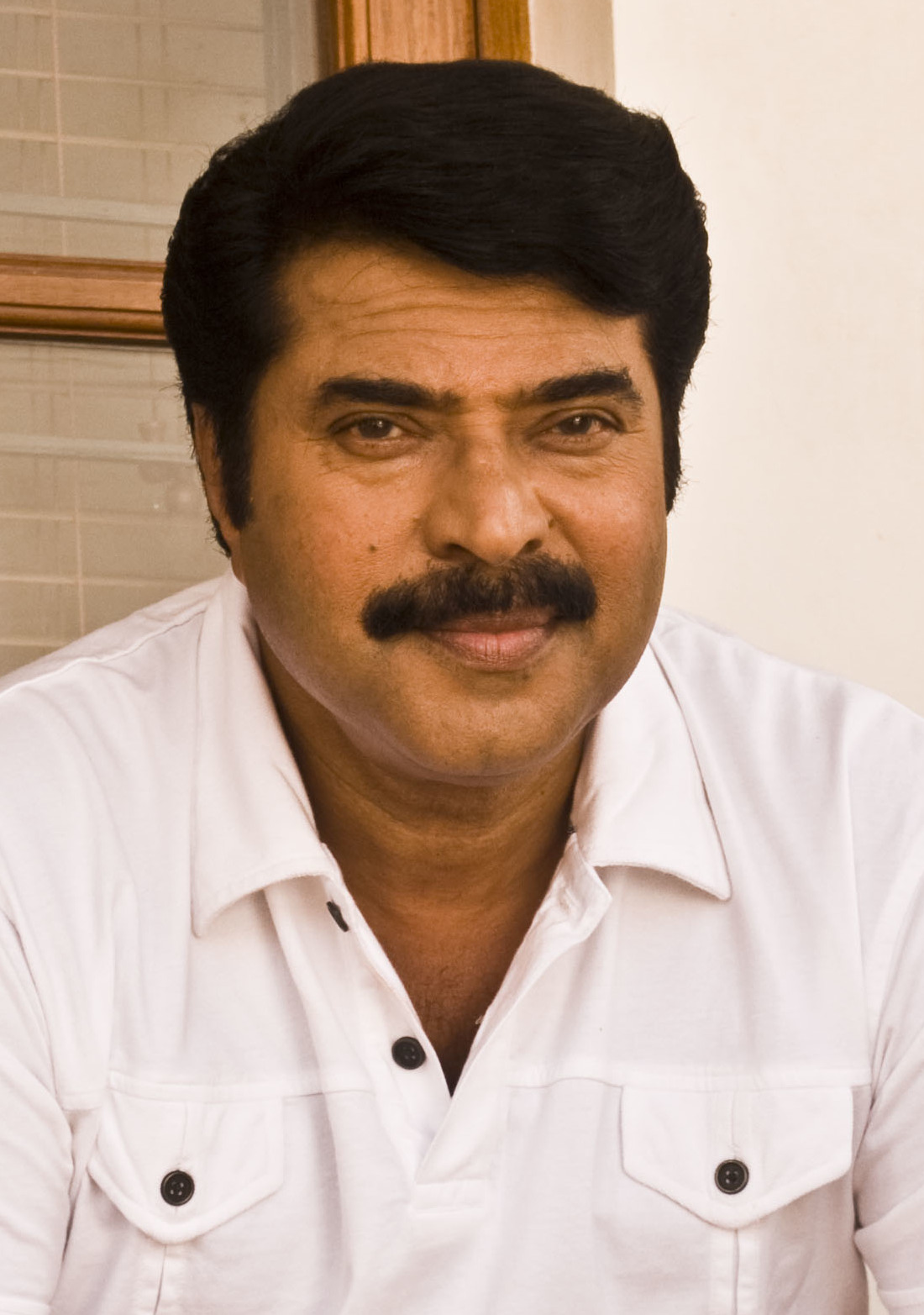
- Mammootty in 2013

Films
- Malayalam: 401
- Tamil: 17
- Other languages: 13
- Narrator / voice-over: 10
- Total: 441
- The statistics above include only released titles; all counts are derived from the films listed in the table.
- Upcoming: 4

Mammootty (born 7 September 1951) is an Indian actor and film producer who works predominantly in Malayalam films. He is widely regarded as one of the greatest actors in the history of Indian cinema. He has acted in 431 films in Malayalam and other languages including Tamil, Telugu, Hindi, English, and Kannada films. He has starred in both art-house and blockbuster films. He has won 4 National Film Awards for Best Actor, 10 Kerala State Film Awards, 11 Kerala Film Critics Awards and 16 Filmfare Awards South.

In 1971, he made his onscreen debut as an extra in K. S. Sethumadhavan's Anubhavangal Paalichakal while studying law at Maharaja's College, Ernakulam. After his debut, he appeared in an uncredited role in Kaalachakram (1973). In 1979, while he was practising law in Manjeri, he was offered a pivotal role in M. T. Vasudevan Nair's Devalokam. However, this film was never released.

In 1980, Mammootty landed his first credited role in the film Vilkkanundu Swapnangal. He continued to act in minor roles in several films such as Mela (1980) and Sphodanam (1981). His first film as an independent lead actor came with I. V. Sasi's Thrishna. Following that, he starred in lead and supporting roles. His role as Vasu in I. V. Sasi's Ahimsa (1981) won him the Kerala State Film Award for Second Best Actor. His breakthrough in Malayalam cinema came with P. G. Vishwambharan's Sandhyakku Virinja Poovu (1983). Mammootty debuted in Tamil cinema with Mounam Sammadham (1989). He made his Telugu film debut with Swathi Kiranam (1992). He made his Hindi cinema debut in the same year with Dhartiputra. Between 1984 and 2000, he won six Filmfare Awards including two consecutive wins for the Best Actor (Malayalam). Mammootty turned producer for Adiyozhukkukal (1984), in which he played the lead role of a fisherman back from jail. The film was produced under the Casino Films banner. In 1998, the Government of India honoured him with its fourth-highest civilian award, The Padma Shri for his contribution to Indian cinema. In 2005, Asianet called him "The greatest method actor to grace Indian cinema."

In 2006 his film Karutha Pakshikal won the National Film Award for Best Film on Family Welfare. In 2010, his film Kutty Srank won the National Film Award for Best Feature Film. He was conferred with the Doctor of Letters degree by the University of Calicut and the University of Kerala in 2010. He was honored with Kerala Prabha Award by Kerala state government in 2022.

== Malayalam films ==
Key
†	Denotes films that have not yet been released

List of Malayalam film credits
Year	Title	Role	Notes	Ref.
1971	Anubhavangal Paalichakal	Background crowd member	Uncredited role	
1973	Kaalachakram	Boatman	Uncredited role	
1980	Vilkkanundu Swapnangal	Madhavan Kutty		
1980	Mela	Vijayan		
1981	Sphodanam	Thankappan		
1981	Munnettam	Rajappan		
1981	Thrishna	Krishna Das		
1981	Oothikachiya Ponnu	Thoman Kutty		
1981	Ahimsa	Vasu	Won Kerala State Film Award for Second Best Actor	
1982	Yavanika	Jacob Eerally		
1982	Vidhichathum Kothichathum	Vasu		
1982	Veedu	Rajasekhara Menon		
1982	Thadaakam	Jabbar		
1982	Sindoora Sandhyakku Mounam	Bitpart		
1982	Saravarsham	Rajashekharan		
1982	Post Mortem	Johny		
1982	Pooviriyum Pulari	Ramesh		
1982	Ponnum Poovum	Salim		
1982	Padayottam	Kammaran		
1982	Oru Thira Pinneyum Thira	Jayadevan		
1982	Komaram	Babu		
1982	Keni	Babu		
1982	John Jaffer Janardhanan	Janardhanan		
1982	Idiyum Minnalum	Prabhakaran		
1982	Enthino Pookunna Pookal	Sivaraman		
1982	Ee Nadu	Salim		
1982	Chiriyo Chiri	Himself	Cameo appearance	
1982	Chambalkadu	Beeran		
1982	Amrutha Geetham	Suresh		
1982	Aa Divasam	Balachandran		
1982	Balloon	Muthukoya		
1982	Innallenkil Naale	Rahim		
1983	Visa	Sharif		
1983	Theeram Thedunna Thira	Madhu		
1983	Sesham Kazhchayil	Jagadish		
1983	Sandhyakku Virinja Poovu	Jayamohan		
1983	Saagaram Shaantham	Ananthan		
1983	Rugma	Raghu		
1983	Rachana	Gopi		
1983	Prathijnja	Hamsa		
1983	Pinnilavu	Unni		
1983	Oru Swakaryam	Usman		
1983	Oru Mukham Pala Mukham	Muralidhran Thambi		
1983	Oru Madapravinte Katha	Balachandran		
1983	Onnu Chirikku	Unnikrishnan		
1983	Nathi Muthal Nathi Vare	Raju		
1983	Nanayam	Raju		
1983	Marakkillorikkalum	Man at the park	Uncredited; cameo appearance	
1983	Manassoru Mahasamudram	Venugopal		
1983	Maniyara	Shameer	50th film	
1983	Lekhayude Maranam Oru Flashback	Prem Sagar		
1983	Saagaram Santham	Ananthan		
1983	Koodevide	Captain Thomas		
1983	Kodunkattu	Musthafa		
1983	Kinnaram	Balachandran		
1983	Kattaruvi	Vasu		
1983	Iniyenkilum	Divakaran		
1983	Himavahini	Gopi		
1983	Guru Dakshina	John		
1983	Ente Katha	Babu		
1983	Coolie	Kunchali		
1983	Changatham	Tony Francis		
1983	Chakravalam Chuvannappol	Vasu		
1983	Asthram	Balu		
1983	America America	Ramesh		
1983	Aadaminte Vaariyellu	Jose		
1983	Aa Rathri	Ravi		
1983	Eettillam	Sivan		
1984	Vikatakavi	Usman		
1984	Vetta	Rathish		
1984	Veendum Chalikkunna Chakram	Jose		
1984	Thirakkil Alppa Samayam	Jose		
1984	Sandarbham	Ravi		
1984	Sandyakkenthinu Sindhooram	Raghunathan		
1984	Paavam Poornima	Jayaraj		
1984	Oru Kochukatha Aarum Parayatha Katha	Dr. Surendran		
1984	Onnum Mindatha Bharya	Achuthan Nair		
1984	Onnanu Nammal	Sethu		
1984	Manithali	Zulfikar		
1984	Mangalam Nerunnu	Babu		
1984	Lakshmana Rekha	Sukumaran Nair		
1984	Koottinilamkili	Krishnanunni		
1984	Kanamarayathu	Roy Varghese		
1984	Ithiri Poove Chuvannapoove	Balagopalan		
1984	Itha Innu Muthal	Adv. Jayamohan		
1984	Ethirppukal	Kochu Baby		
1984	Ente Upasana	Arjunan		
1984	Enganeyundashaane	Gopikuttan Pillai		
1984	Idavelakku Sesham	Jayadevan		
1984	Chakkarayumma	Babu		
1984	Athirathram	Tharadas		
1984	Ariyaatha Veethikal	Ravi		
1984	Anithichuvappu	George Kutty		
1984	Alakadalinakkare	Anand		
1984	Aksharangal	Jayadevan		
1984	Akkare	Ismail		
1984	Adiyozhukkukal	Karunan	Won Kerala State Film Award for Best Actor	
1984	Aayiram Abilashangal	Devadasan		
1984	Aattuvanchi Ulanjappol	Balachandran		
1984	Aarorumariyathe	Venugopal	100th film	
1984	Aalkkoottathil Thaniye	Rajan		
1984	Kodathi	Rajendran		
1985	Thinkalazhcha Nalla Divasam	Gopan		
1985	Parayanumvayya Parayathirikkanumvayya	Sreekumar		
1985	Muhurtham Pathnonnu Muppathinu	Dr. M. K. Haridas		
1985	Ee Thanalil Ithiri Neram	Vijayan		
1985	Avidathepole Ivideyum	Anirudhan		
1985	Eeran Sandhya	Madhavankutty		
1985	Thammil Thammil	Dr. Rajagopal		
1985	Makan Ente Makan	Prakasan		
1985	Oduvil Kittiya Vartha	Gopalan Kutty		
1985	Anubandham	Muraleedharan Master		
1985	Ee Sabdam Innathe Sabdam	Dr. Ramachandran		
1985	Katha Ithuvare	Balachandran		
1985	Oru Sandesam Koodi	Vijayan		
1985	Manya Mahajanangale	Devan		
1985	Onningu Vannengil	Mohandas		
1985	Oru Nokku Kanan	Jayadevan		
1985	Ayanam	Johny		
1985	Angadikkappurath	Jose		
1985	Ente Kaanakkuyil	Mohan Kumar		
1985	Puzhayozhukum Vazhi	Gopan		
1985	Iniyum Katha Thudarum	Ravindran		
1985	Idanilangal	Vijayan		
1985	Nirakkoottu	Ravi Varma		
1985	Yathra	Unnikrishnan		
1985	Ee Lokam Ivide Kure Manushyar	Ummer		
1985	Kanathaya Penkutty	Ram Mohan		
1985	Vilichu Vilikettu	Vijayan		
1985	Puli Varunne Puli	Jayaraman		
1985	Aa Neram Alppa Dooram	Jameskutty		
1985	Karimbinpoovinakkare	Sivan	Co-producer	
1985	Upaharam	Dr. Jeevan Thomas		
1985	Kathodu Kathoram	Louis		
1985	Kandu Kandarinju	Sreedharan		
1985	Akalathe Ambili	Ajayan		
1986	Oru Katha Oru Nunnakkatha	Prof. Mohandas		
1986	Shyama	Viswanathan		
1986	Ithile Iniyum Varu	Aravindan		
1986	Mazha Peyyunnu Maddalam Kottunnu	Guest in a wedding	Cameo appearance	
1986	Aalorungi Arangorungi	Rajan		
1986	Vartha	Madhavan Kutty		
1986	Kariyila Kattu Pole	Harikrishnan		
1986	Malarum Kiliyum	Balachandran		
1986	Kshamichu Ennoru Vakku	Adv. Ravindranath		
1986	Prathyekam Sradhikuka	Suresh		
1986	Arappatta Kettiya Gramathil	Zacharia		
1986	Poomukhappadiyil Ninneyum Kathu	Isacc Peter		
1986	Neram Pularumbol	Lawrence		
1986	Kaveri	Dr. Hari	150th film	
1986	Snehamulla Simham	Vaishakhan		
1986	Adukkan Entheluppam	Srinivasan Nair		
1986	Gandhinagar 2nd Street	Balachandran	Co-producer	
1986	Nandi Veendum Varika	Mohandas		
1986	Moonnu Masangalkku Munpu	Dr. Rajasekhran		
1986	Aayiram Kannukal	Dr. Sam		
1986	Ice Cream	Thampi		
1986	Poovinnu Puthiya Poonthennal	Kiran		
1986	Aavanazhi	Balram		
1986	Nyayavidhi	Paramu		
1986	Ee Kaikalil	Sultan Abdul Razak		
1986	Veendum	Vijaya Chandran		
1986	Geetham	Yatheendran		
1986	Pranamam	Prathapan		
1986	Padayani	Sudhakaran		
1986	Sayam Sandhya	Sivaprasad		
1986	Rakkuyilin Ragasadassil	Viswanathan		
1986	Aval Kaathirunnu Avanum....	Gopinath		
1986	Kochu Themmadi	Sekharan Master		
1986	Rareeram	Nandakumar		
1986	Ennu Nathante Nimmi	Mahesh		
1987	Kottum Kuravayum	Damu		
1987	Kathakku Pinnil	Thampi		
1987	Oru Sindoora Pottinte Ormakku	Roy Thampi		
1987	Sreedharante Onnam Thirumurivu	Sreedharan		
1987	Ithrayum Kalam	Varghese		
1987	Nombarathi Poovu	Dr. Padmanabhan		
1987	Adimakal Udamakal	Raghavan		
1987	Athinumappuram	Ravindran		
1987	Kalam Mari Katha Mari	Kamarudden		
1987	New Delhi	G. Krishnamoorthy		
1987	Thaniyavarthanam	Balagopalan		
1987	Manivathoorile Aayiram Sivarathrikal	Dr. Vinayachandran		
1987	Aankiliyude Tharattu	Haridas		
1987	Anantaram	Dr. Balu		
1987	Nalkkavala	Babu		
1988	Manu Uncle	Manu Uncle		
1988	Vicharana	Sethumadhavan		
1988	Dhinarathrangal	Aravindan		
1988	Oru CBI Diary Kurippu	Sethurama Iyer		
1988	Abkari	Vasu		
1988	Sangham	Kuttappai		
1988	August 1	Perumal		
1988	Mattoral	Balan		
1988	1921	Naik Khader		
1988	Thanthram	George Korah Vettickal		
1988	Mukthi	Haridas		
1988	Sanghunadam	Chandran		
1989	Charithram	Philipose Manavalan		
1989	Mudra	Ramabhadran	200th film	
1989	Adikkurippu	Bhaskara Pillai		
1989	Oru Vadakkan Veeragatha	Chanthu Chekavar	National Film Award for Best Actor	
1989	Utharam	Balachandran Nair		
1989	Adharvam	Anantha Padmanabhan		
1989	Carnival	Bharathan		
1989	Artham	Ben Narendran		
1989	Jagratha	Sethurama Iyer		
1989	Nair Saab	Captain Ravindran Nair		
1989	Mahayanam	Chandran		
1989	Mrughaya	Varghese aka Varunni		
1990	Purappadu	Viswanathan		
1990	Kottayam Kunjachan	Kunjachan		
1990	Kuttettan	Vishnu Narayanan		
1990	Midhya	Venugopal		
1990	Mathilukal	Vaikom Muhammad Basheer	National Film Award for Best Actor	
1990	Samrajyam	Alexander		
1990	Kalikkalam	Thief		
1990	Oliyampukal	Arackal Baby Mathew		
1990	Iyer the Great	Soorya Narayana Iyer		
1990	Ee Thanutha Veluppan Kalathu	Haridas Damodaran		
1990	No. 20 Madras Mail	Himself	Cameo appearance	
1990	Parampara	Lawrence/Johny		
1991	Amaram	Achootty		
1991	Nayam Vyakthamakkunnu	Sukumaran		
1991	Inspector Balram	Inspector Balram		
1991	Adayalam	Hariharan		
1991	Kanalkkattu	Nathu Narayanan		
1991	Anaswaram	Daniel D'Souza		
1991	Neelagiri	Sivan		
1992	Kauravar	Antony		
1992	Soorya Manasam	Putturumees		
1992	Johnnie Walker	John Varghese		
1992	Mahanagaram	Chanthakkadu Viswan		
1992	Kizhakkan Pathrose	Pathrose		
1992	Pappayude Swantham Appoos	Balachandran		
1993	Dhruvam	Narasimha Mannadiyar		
1993	Aayirappara	Shouwri		
1993	Vatsalyam	Meledathu Raghvan Nair		
1993	Jackpot	Gautham Krishna		
1993	Sarovaram	Devadathan		
1993	Padheyam	Chandradas		
1993	Golanthara Vartha	Ramesan Nair		
1994	Vidheyan	Bhaskar Patelar	National Film Award for Best Actor	
1994	Ponthan Mada	Mada	National Film Award for Best Actor	
1994	Vishnu	Vishnu		
1994	Sagaram Sakshi	Balachandran		
1994	Sainyam	Captain Eswar		
1994	Sukrutham	Ravishankar		
1995	Mazhayethum Munpe	Nandakumar Varma		
1995	Oru Abhibhashakante Case Diary	Aniyan Kuruvilla		
1995	No. 1 Snehatheeram Bangalore North	Vijaya Bhasker		
1995	Ormakal Undayirikkanam	Bhasi		
1995	The King	Thevalliparambil Joseph Alex		
1996	Azhakiya Ravanan	Sanker Das		
1996	Hitler	Madhavan Kutty		
1996	Aayiram Naavulla Ananthan	Dr. Anantha Padmanabhan		
1996	Indraprastham	Sathish Menon		
1996	Udhyanapalakan	Sudhakaran Nair		
1997	Oral Mathram	Hareendran		
1997	Kaliyoonjal	Nandagopalan		
1997	Bhoothakkannadi	Vidyadharan Nair		
1998	The Truth	Bharath Patteri		
1998	Oru Maravathoor Kanavu	Chandy		
1998	Sidhartha	Sidhartha		
1998	Harikrishnans	Hari		
1998	Elavamkodu Desam	Jathavethan		
1999	The Godman	Amarnath		
1999	Stalin Sivadas	Sivadas		
1999	Megham	Col. Ravivarma Thampuran		
1999	Thachiledathu Chundan	Kochu Kunju		
1999	Ezhupunna Tharakan	Ezhupunna Sunny Tharakan		
1999	Prem Poojari	Himself	Cameo appearance	
1999	Pallavur Devanarayanan	Pallavur Devanarayana Pothuval		
2000	Arayannagalude Veedu	Ravindranath		
2000	Narasimham	Adv. Nandagopal Marar	Cameo appearance	
2000	Valliettan	Arackal Madhavanunni		
2000	Dada Sahib	Abubacker / Dada Sahib	Dual role	
2001	Rakshasa Rajavu	Ramanadhan IPS		
2001	Dubai	Ravi Mamman		-
2001	Dany	Danniel Thomson		
2002	Phantom	Phantom Phaliey		
2002	Kai Ethum Doorathu	Gopinathan	Cameo appearance	
2003	Chronic Bachelor	Sathyaprathapan		
2003	Pattalam	Pattabhi Raman		
2004	Sethurama Iyer CBI	Sethurama Iyer		
2004	Vajram	Devarajan		
2004	Aparichithan	Raghuram		
2004	Kaazhcha	Madhavan		
2004	Black	Karikkamuri Shanmukhan		
2004	Vesham	Appu		
2005	Thommanum Makkalum	Sivan		
2005	Thaskara Veeran	Arakkal Baby		
2005	Rappakal	Krishnan		
2005	Nerariyan CBI	Sethurama Iyer		
2005	Rajamanikyam	Bellary Raja	300th film	
2005	Bus Conductor	Zakir Hussain		
2006	Thuruppu Gulan	Kunjumon aka Gulan		
2006	Balram vs. Tharadas	Balaram / Tharadas	Dual role	
2006	Prajapathi	Devarmadam Narayanan		
2006	Bhargava Charitham Moonam Khandam	Current Bharghavan		
2006	Pothen Vava	Pothen Vava		
2006	Karutha Pakshikal	Murugan		
2006	Palunku	Monichan		
2007	Kaiyoppu	Balachandran		
2007	Mayavi	Mahi aka Mayavi		
2007	Big B	Bilal John Kurishingal		
2007	Mission 90 Days	Major Sivaram		
2007	Ore Kadal	Dr. S. R. Nathan		
2007	Nazrani	David John Kottarathil		
2007	Katha Parayumbol	Ashok Raj	Extended cameo	
2008	Roudram	ACP Narendran		
2008	Annan Thambi	Appu / Achu	Dual role	
2008	Parunthu	Parunthu Purushothaman		
2008	One Way Ticket	Himself	Cameo appearance	
2008	Mayabazar	'Akkiri' Rameshan/Swami	Dual role	
2008	Twenty:20	Advt. Ramesh Nambiar		
2009	Love in Singapore	Machu		
2009	Ee Pattanathil Bhootham	Jimmy / Genie	Dual rols	
2009	Daddy Cool	Antony Simon		
2009	Loudspeaker	Philipose aka 'Mike'		
2009	Pazhassi Raja	Kerala Varma Pazhassi Raja		
2009	Kerala Cafe	Unnamed	Anthology film; segment Puramkazhchakal	
2009	Paleri Manikyam: Oru Pathirakolapathakathinte Katha	Haridas / Ahmed Haji / Khalid Ahmed	Triple role	
2009	Chattambinaadu	Virendra Mallayya		
2010	Drona 2010	Madhavan / Kunjunni	Dual role	
2010	Yugapurushan	K C Kuttan		
2010	Pramaani	Vishwanatha Panicker		
2010	Pokkiri Raja	Madhurai Raja		
2010	Kutty Srank	Kutty Shranku		
2010	Pranchiyettan & the Saint	Chirammal Enashu Francis		
2010	Best of Luck	Himself	Cameo appearance	
2010	Best Actor	Mohan		
2011	August 15	Perumal		
2011	Doubles	Giri		
2011	The Train	Kedarnath		
2011	Bombay March 12	Sameer (Sanathanan Bhat)		
2011	Venicile Vyapari	Pavithran		
2012	The King & the Commissioner	Joseph Alex Thevliparambil		
2012	Cobra	Raja / Shivadas Naidu	Dual role	
2012	Thappana	Samson		
2012	Jawan of Vellimala	Gopi Krishan		
2012	Face2Face	Balachandran		
2012	Bavuttiyude Namathil	Bavutty		
2013	Proprietors: Kammath & Kammath	Raja Raja Kammath		
2013	Immanuel	Immanuel		
2013	Kadal Kadannoru Mathukkutty	Matthew George aka Mathukkutty / Himself	Dual role	
2013	Kunjananthante Kada	Kunjananthan		
2013	Daivathinte Swantham Cleetus	Cleetus		
2013	Silence	Aravind Chandrasekhar		
2014	Balyakalasakhi	Majeed / Majeed's father	Dual role	
2014	Praise the Lord	Joy		
2014	Gangster	Akbar Ali Khan		
2014	Manglish	Malik Bhai		
2014	Munnariyippu	CK Raghavan		
2014	RajadhiRaja	Shekharan Kutty aka Rajashekhar/ Raja		
2014	Varsham	P. K.Venugopal		
2015	Fireman	Vijay		
2015	Bhaskar the Rascal	Bhaskar		
2015	Acha Dhin	Durgadas		
2015	Utopiayile Rajavu	C.P. Swathanthran / Chempakassery Neelakandan		
2015	Pathemari	Pallikal Narayanan		
2016	Puthiya Niyamam	Adv. Louis Pothen		
2016	Kasaba	Rajan Zachariah		
2016	White	Prakash Roy		
2016	Thoppil Joppan	Thoppil Joppan		
2017	The Great Father	David Nainan		
2017	Puthan Panam	Nithyananda Shenoy		
2017	Pullikkaran Staraa	K. Rajakumaran		
2017	Masterpiece	Edward Livingstone / DIG Anto Antony IPS		
2018	Street Lights	Crime Branch CI James Abraham		
2018	Captain	Himself	Cameo appearance	
2018	Parole	Comrade Alex		
2018	Uncle	Krishna Kumar		
2018	Abrahaminte Santhathikal	ASP Derick Abraham IPS		
2018	Oru Kuttanadan Blog	Nediyedath Hari		
2019	Madhura Raja	'Madhura' Raja		
2019	Unda	S. I. Manikandan C.P.		
2019	Pathinettam Padi	John Abraham Palackal	Extended cameo	
2019	Ganagandharvan	Kalasadhan Ullas		
2019	Mamangam	Chandroth Valiya Panicker		
2020	Shylock	Devan / Boss		
2021	The Priest	Father Carmen Benedict		
2021	One	Kadakkal Chandran		
2022	Bheeshma Parvam	Michael "Michealappan" Anjootti		
2022	CBI 5: The Brain	Sethurama Iyer		
2022	Puzhu	Kuttan		
2022	Priyan Ottathilanu	Himself	Cameo appearance	
2022	Rorschach	Luke Antony	Also producer	
2023	Nanpakal Nerathu Mayakkam	Jameson "James" / Sundaram	Also producer	
2023	Christopher	ADGP Christopher Anthony IPS		
2023	Kannur Squad	ASI George Martin	Also producer	
2023	Kaathal – The Core	Mathew Devassy	Also producer	
2024	Abraham Ozler	Dr. Alexander "Alex" Joseph	Extended cameo	
2024	Bramayugam	Manakkal Kodumon Potti		
2024	Turbo	Turbo Jose	Also producer	
2025	Dominic and the Ladies' Purse	CI Dominic	Also producer	
2025	Bazooka	Aryan Acharya / John Caesar / Bazooka		
2025	Kalamkaval	S. I. Stanley Das	Also producer	
2026	Chatha Pacha	"Bullet" Walter Lopez	Cameo appearance	
2026	Patriot	Dr. Daniel James		
2026	Law and Order	Karikkamuri Shanmughan	Cameo	
2026	Padayaatra †	Dr. Devadas	Also producer; completed	
2027	Mela †	TBA	Filming	
2027	Mattancherry Mafia †	TBA	Announced	
2027	Untitled Mammootty–Cubes entertainment film †	TBA	Announced	

== Tamil films ==
List of Tamil film credits
Year	Title	Role	Notes	Ref.
1990	Mounam Sammadham	Adv. K.C. Raja M.A., B.L., Bar-at-law		
1991	Azhagan	Azhagappan		
1991	Thalapathi	Devaraj (Deva)		
1993	Kilipetchu Ketkava	Chidambaram		
1995	Makkal Aatchi	Sethupathi		
1997	Pudhayal	Captain Vishwanath		
1997	Arasiyal	Chandrasekhar		
1998	Marumalarchi	Rasu Padayachi		
1999	Edhirum Pudhirum	Kannan		
2000	Kandukondain Kandukondain	Major Bala		
2001	Aanandham	Thirupathi		
2002	Junior Senior	Santhosh		
2002	Karmegham	Karmegham		
2004	Vishwa Thulasi	Vishwa		
2010	Vandae Maatharam	Gopikrishnan IPS	Bilingual film; Simultaneously shot in Malayalam	
2019	Peranbu	Amudhavan		
2026	O.M: Operation Mole	"Burma" Karthikeyan (Siya)		

== Other language films ==
List of other language film credits
Year	Title	Role	Language	Notes	Ref.
1990	Triyathri	Mathew	Hindi		
1992	Swathi Kiranam	Anantha Rama Sharma	Telugu		
1993	Dhartiputra	Kapil Dev Singh	Hindi		
1997	Surya Putrulu	Prakash	Telugu		
1998	Swami Vivekananda	Maharaja	Hindi	Special appearance	
2000	Dr. Babasaheb Ambedkar	B. R. Ambedkar	English	National Film Award for Best Actor	
2001	Railway Coolie	Prabhu	Telugu	Shot in 1993; delayed release	
2005	Sau Jhooth Ek Sach – The Uninvited	Inspector Vivek	Hindi		
2008	Halla Bol	Himself	Hindi	Guest appearance	
2012	Shikari	Aruna / Abhijith	Kannada	Bilingual film; Simultaneously shot in Malayalam; Dual role	
2019	Yatra	Y. S. Rajasekhara Reddy	Telugu		
2023	Agent	RAW Chief Colonel Mahadev / Guruji / The Devil	Telugu		
2024	Yatra 2	Y. S. Rajasekhara Reddy	Telugu		

== Narrator / voice-over ==
List of narrator / voiceover film credits
Year	Title	Language	Notes	Ref.
2010	Anwar	Malayalam		
2017	1971: Beyond Borders	Malayalam		
2018	Odiyan	Malayalam		
2022	Jana Gana Mana	Malayalam		
2022	Pathonpatham Noottandu	Malayalam		
2022	Ponniyin Selvan: I	Malayalam	Dubbed version	
2022	Malikappuram	Malayalam		
2023	Ponniyin Selvan: II	Malayalam	Dubbed version	
2024	Barroz 3D	Malayalam		
2025	Lokah Chapter 1: Chandra	Malayalam	As Moothon	

== Short film ==
List of short film credits
Year	Title	Language	Notes	Ref.
2025	Aaro — Someone	Malayalam	Producer	

== Unreleased films ==
List of unreleased film credits
Year	Title	Role	Language	Notes	Ref.
1979	Devalokam	Pappachan	Malayalam	First credited role	
2001	Ek Din Anjaane Mein		Hindi	Initially titled as 'Shafaq'	

== Television ==
Key
†	Denotes television productions that have not yet been released

List of television credits
Year	Title	Role	Language	Notes	Ref.
2000-2002	Jwalayayi	Producer	Malayalam	Under banner Megabytes	
2006	Veendum Jwalayayi	Producer	Malayalam	Under banner Megabytes	
2010	Anthony Bourdain: No Reservations	Himself	English	Season 6 Episode 17	
2024	Manorathangal	Venugopal	Malayalam	Anthology series Segment: "Kadugannawa Oru Yatra Kurippu"	

== See also ==
- List of awards and nominations received by Mammootty
