= List of awards and nominations received by Mammootty =

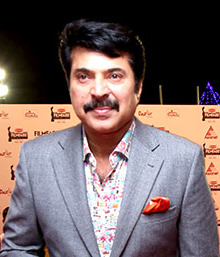
Mammootty at 62nd Filmfare Awards South

Mammootty is an Indian actor who works primarily in the Malayalam film industry. He is regarded as India's greatest actor of all time. Over a career spanning five decades, he has received extensive critical acclaim and numerous honours, including four National Film Award for Best Actor, eleven Kerala State Film Awards, eleven Kerala Film Critics Awards and Sixteen Filmfare Awards South. Mammootty holds the record for the most appearances in the final round of the National Film Award for Best Actor. He has been honoured at international film festivals such as the International Film Festival of India and the Muscat International Film Festival.

He has received several major civilian and academic honours. In 2026, he was awarded the Padma Bhushan by the Government of India for his contributions to Indian cinema. Earlier, he received the Padma Shri from the Government of India in 1998 and the Kerala Prabha from the Government of Kerala in 2022. He also received honorary doctorates from the University of Kerala, the University of Calicut and Mahatma Gandhi University.

Mammootty received his first National Film Award for Best Actor in 1990 for Oru Vadakkan Veeragatha and Mathilukal. In 1994, he secured his second National Film Award for Best Actor for his performances in Adoor Gopalakrishnan's Vidheyan and T. V. Chandran's Ponthan Mada. In 1999, Mammootty received his third National Film Award for Best Actor for Dr. Babasaheb Ambedkar, in which he portrayed the role of B. R. Ambedkar. Mammootty received his fourth National Film Award for Best Actor for Bramayugam in 2026.

In 2013, an online poll conducted by CNN-IBN on their website as part of t in 2026. 100 years celebration of Indian cinema ranked two of his films, Oru Vadakkan Veeragatha and Anantaram, amongst the "greatest Indian film ever". On the centenary of Indian cinema in April 2013, Forbes included Mammootty's performance in Mathilukal on its list, "25 Greatest Acting Performances of Indian Cinema". In 2019, Vogue India published a list of Biggest icons of south Indian cinema, labelled him as "Master". In 2005, Asianet called him "The greatest method actor to grace Indian cinema."

He owned a film production company, Casino Films, which produced several of his films. He formed a television production company, Megabytes, which produced television serials, the first being Jwalayay. In 2022, he became one of the few actors in India to have completed 50 years in Indian cinema. Mammootty has been honoured at a few international film festivals like the Muscat International Film Festival and International Film Festival of India.

== Honorary awards ==
Year	Award	Honouring body	Ref(s)
1998	Padma Shri	Government of India	
2010	Honorary Doctor of Letters (D.Litt.)	University of Kerala	
2010	Honorary Doctor of Letters (D.Litt.)	University of Calicut	
2022	Kerala Prabha	Government of Kerala	
2026	Padma Bhushan	Government of India	
2026	Honorary Doctor of Letters (D.Litt.)	Mahatma Gandhi University	

== National Film Awards ==
Year	Nominated work	Category	Language	Ref(s)
1989	Mathilukal; Oru Vadakkan Veeragatha	Best Actor	Malayalam	
1993	Ponthan Mada; Vidheyan	Best Actor	Malayalam	
1998	Dr. Babasaheb Ambedkar	Best Actor	English	
2026	Bramayugam	Best Actor	Malayalam	

== Kerala State Film Awards ==
Year	Nominated work	Category	Ref(s)
1981	Ahimsa	Second Best Actor	
1984	Adiyozhukkukal	Best Actor	
1985	Yathra, Nirakkoottu	Special Jury Award	
1989	Oru Vadakkan Veeragadha, Mrigaya, Mahayanam	Best Actor	
1993	Vidheyan, Ponthan Mada, Vatsalyam	Best Actor	
2004	Kaazhcha	Best Actor	
2009	Paleri Manikyam	Best Actor	
2022	Nanpakal Nerathu Mayakkam	Best Actor	
2022	Nanpakal Nerathu Mayakkam	Best Film	
2023	Kaathal - The Core	Best Film	
2024	Bramayugam	Best Actor	

== Kerala Film Critics Awards ==
Year	Nominated work	Category	Ref(s)
1982	Yavanika	Second Best Actor	
1984	Aksharangal, Kaanamarayathu	Best Actor	
1985	Anubandham, Nirakkoottu, Kochu Themmadi	Best Actor	
1987	Thaniyavarthanam, New Delhi	Best Actor	
1989	Mathilukal, Oru Vadakkan Veeragatha, Mrugaya	Best Actor	
1992	Soorya Manasam, Aayirappara, Pappayude Swantham Appoos	Best Actor	
1994	Sukrutham	Best Actor	
2004	Lifetime Achievement Award	Chalachitra Ratnam Award	
2006	Karutha Pakshikal, Kaiyoppu	Best Actor	
2010	Pranchiyettan and the Saint	Best Actor	
2020	Lifetime Achievement Award	Ruby Jubilee Award	

== Filmfare Awards South ==
Year	Nominated work	Category	Result	Ref(s)
1984	Adiyozhukkukal	Best Actor – Malayalam	Won	
1985	Yathra	Best Actor – Malayalam	Won	
1990	Mathilukal	Best Actor – Malayalam	Won	
1991	Amaram	Best Actor – Malayalam	Won	
1997	Bhoothakkannadi	Best Actor – Malayalam	Won	
2000	Arayannagalude Veedu	Best Actor – Malayalam	Won	
2004	Kaazhcha	Best Actor – Malayalam	Won	
2006	Karutha Pakshikal	Best Actor – Malayalam	Won	
2006	—	Legends (Honorary Award)	Won	
1990	Azhagan	Best Actor – Tamil	Nominated	
1992	Swathi Kiranam	Best Actor – Telugu	Nominated	
2009	Paleri Manikyam	Best Actor – Malayalam	Won	
2010	Pranchiyettan and the Saint	Best Actor – Malayalam	Won	
2014	Varsham	Best Actor – Malayalam	Won	
2015	Pathemari	Best Actor – Malayalam	Won	
2023	Nanpakal Nerathu Mayakkam	Best Actor – Malayalam	Won	
2023	Nanpakal Nerathu Mayakkam	Best Film	Nominated	
2023	Kaathal – The Core	Best Actor	Nominated	
2023	Kaathal – The Core	Best Film	Nominated	
2024	Bramayugam	Best Actor	Won	

== IIFA Utsavam ==
Year	Nominated work	Category	Result
2016	Varsham	Performance in Lead role - Male	Nominated

== South Indian International Movie Awards ==
Year	Nominated work	Category	Result
2014	Immanuel	Best Actor	Nominated
2015	Varsham	Best Actor	Nominated
2016	Pathemari	Best Actor	Nominated
2017	The Great Father	Best Actor	Nominated
2020	Unda	Best Actor	Nominated

== Ramu Kariat Awards ==
Year	Nominated work	Category	Result	Ref(s)
2009	Paleri Manikyam: Oru Pathira Kolapathakathinte Katha	Best Actor	Won	
2015	Pathemari	Best Actor	Won	
2019	Mamangam	Best Actor	Won	

== Asiavision Awards ==
Year	Nominated work	Category	Ref(s)
2011	—	Millennium Star	
2013	Kunjananthante Kada	Best Actor	
2014	Munnariyippu	Best Actor	

== Asianet Film Award ==
Year	Nominated work	Category	Ref(s)
2000	Arayannagalude Veedu	Best Actor	
2004	Kaazhcha, Vesham	Best Actor	
2007	Ore Kadal, Big B, Kadha Parayumbol	Best Actor	
2009	—	Asianet Millennium Star Award	
2010	Pranchiyettan and the Saint, Best Actor, Kutty Srank	Best Actor	
2011	—	Cultural Icon of Kerala	
2012	—	Guest of Honour Award	
2013	Kunjananthante Kada, Immanuel	Best Actor	
2014	Varsham, Munnariyippu	Best Actor	

== Vanitha Film Awards ==
Year	Nominated work	Category	Ref(s)
2007	Big B, Ore Kadal	Best Actor	
2009	Loud Speaker, Paleri Manikyam: Oru Pathirakolapathakathinte Katha, Kerala Varma Pazhassi Raja	Best Actor	
2010	Pranchiyettan and the Saint	Best Actor	
2014	Varsham	Best Actor	
2024	Kaathal – The Core, Kannur Squad, Nanpakal Nerathu Mayakkam	Best Actor	

== Other major honors and recognitions ==
- 2024: Mazhavil Entertainment Awards 2024 for Entertainer of the Year (Actor)
- 2020: Vaikom Muhammad Basheer Binale Foundation Award
- 2020: Critics Choice Film Awards for Best Actor (Malayalam) - Unda
- 2019: Makudam Award for Best Actor - Peranbu
- 2015: P S John Endowment Award
- 2014: Kashmir International Film Festival - Lifetime Achievement Award
- 2012: Thikkurussy Foundation Award for Contributions to Malayalam Cinema
- 2010: Amrita-FEFKA Film Awards for Best Actor - Pranchiyettan and the Saint
- 2010: Inspire Film Awards for Best Actor - Pranchiyettan and the Saint
- 2010: Vellinakshatram Film Awards for Best Actor - Pranchiyettan and the Saint
- 2009: Surya Film Award For Best Actor for Paleri Manikyam: Oru Pathira Kolapathakathinte Katha
- 2009: Jaihind Film Award For Best Actor for Paleri Manikyam: Oru Pathira Kolapathakathinte Katha
- 2008: Jaihind Utsav Awards-Actor of the Decade (Special Award)
