= Devalokam =

Devalokam may refer to:

- Devaloka, the world of gods in Hindu mythology
- Devalokam, a neighborhood of Kottayam, Kerala, India
- Devalokam (film), an unfinished Indian Malayalam-language film

== See also ==
- Devlok with Devdutt Pattanaik, an Indian TV show
