= Mammootty =

Indian actor and film producer (born 1951)

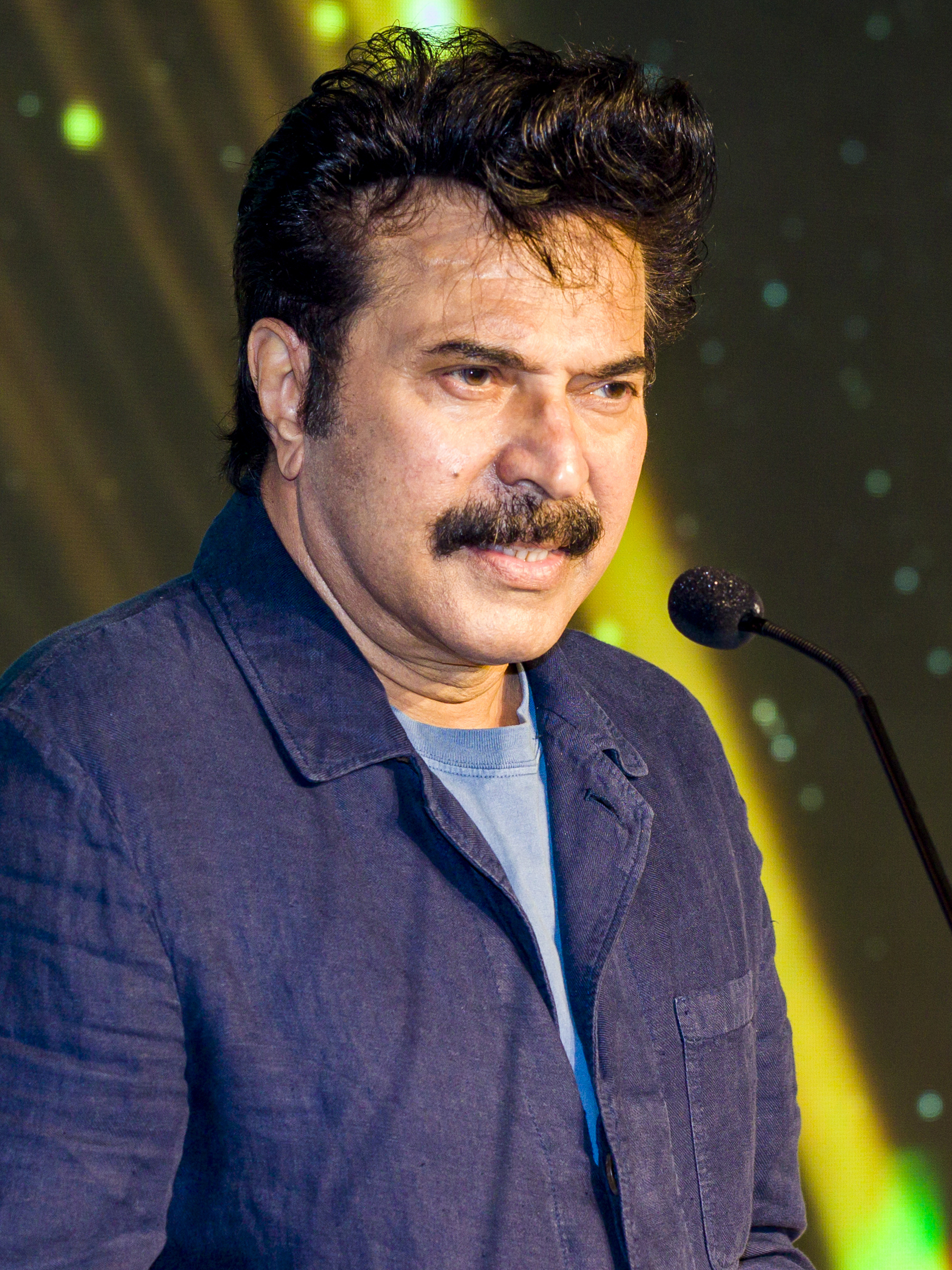
- Mammootty in 2022
- Born: Muhammad Kutty Panaparambil Ismail; 7 September 1951 (age 75); Chandiroor, Travancore–Cochin (present day Alappuzha, Kerala), India
- Education: Sacred Heart College; Maharaja's College (BA); Govt. Law College; Mahatma Gandhi University (LLB), (D.Litt); University of Kerala; University of Calicut (D.Litt)
- Occupations: Actor; Former Lawyer; Film producer
- Years active: 1971–present
- Organization: Mammootty Kampany
- Works: Full list
- Spouse: Sulfath (m. 1979)
- Children: 2, including Dulquer Salmaan
- Family: Mammootty family
- Awards: Full list
- Honours: Padma Shri (1998); Kerala Prabha (2022); Padma Bhushan (2026)

Muhammad Kutty Panaparambil Ismail (born 7 September 1951), known professionally as Mammootty ([mɐmːuːʈːi]), is an Indian actor and film producer who works predominantly in Malayalam-language films. With a career spanning over five decades, he has appeared in over 400 films, predominantly in lead roles, across Malayalam, Tamil, Telugu, Kannada, Hindi, and English languages. He is the recipient of several accolades, including four National Film Awards, eleven Kerala State Film Awards, eleven Kerala Film Critics Awards and fifteen Filmfare Awards South. He received the Padma Bhushan, the third-highest civilian award, in 2026 for his contributions to cinema, and earlier the Padma Shri, the fourth-highest civilian award, from the Government of India in 1998. He was also honoured with the Kerala Prabha Award by the Government of Kerala in 2022. Mammootty was named as one of "the men who changed the face of the Indian Cinema" by CNN-News18 .

Mammootty made his screen debut as a junior artiste in the drama film Anubhavangal Paalichakal (1971). He got his first credited role in M. T. Vasudevan Nair's Vilkkanundu Swapnangal (1980). After playing a few supporting roles, he progressed to lead role in I. V. Sasi's romantic drama Thrishna (1981). He continued to do secondary and lead roles in the following years. By the early to mid 1980's, he established himself a bankable leading actor by starring in several successful films in 1984 and 1985; the crime drama Athirathram (1984), the action thriller Nirakkoottu (1985) and the romantic drama Yathra (1985) heightened his stardom. Mammootty predominantly works in Malayalam cinema, but has also appeared in other language films. Some of his best known non-Malayalam films include the Tamil gangster drama film Thalapathi (1991), the Tamil romantic drama Kandukondain Kandukondain (2000), the Telugu musical drama Swathi Kiranam (1992) and the English-Hindi bilingual biopic Dr. Babasaheb Ambedkar (2000).

Mammootty has won four National Film Awards, seven Kerala State Film Awards, fourteen Filmfare Awards, eleven Kerala Film Critics Awards and five Asianet Film Awards (from fourteen nominations). In 1998, the government of India honoured Mammootty with its fourth highest civilian award, Padma Shri for his contribution to the Indian film industry. He was conferred with the Doctor of Letters degree by the University of Calicut and the University of Kerala in 2010, and by Mahatma Gandhi University in 2026. In 2022, he was the honoured with Kerala Prabha, the second-highest award given by the Government of Kerala.

Mammootty's life and career have been included in the undergraduate syllabus of Maharaja's College, Ernakulam's BA History programme, as part of the "History of Malayalam Cinema" course, in recognition of his significant contribution to the film industry. He is the chairman of Malayalam Communications, which runs the Malayalam television channels Kairali TV, Kairali News, and Kairali We. He is the owner of multiple production ventures, including the distribution-production banner, Playhouse, and production company, Mammootty Kampany. In 2007, Mammootty published his first book, Kazhchapadu (roughly translated as "Perspective"), a compilation of short essays he had written in various publications over the years.

== Early life and family ==
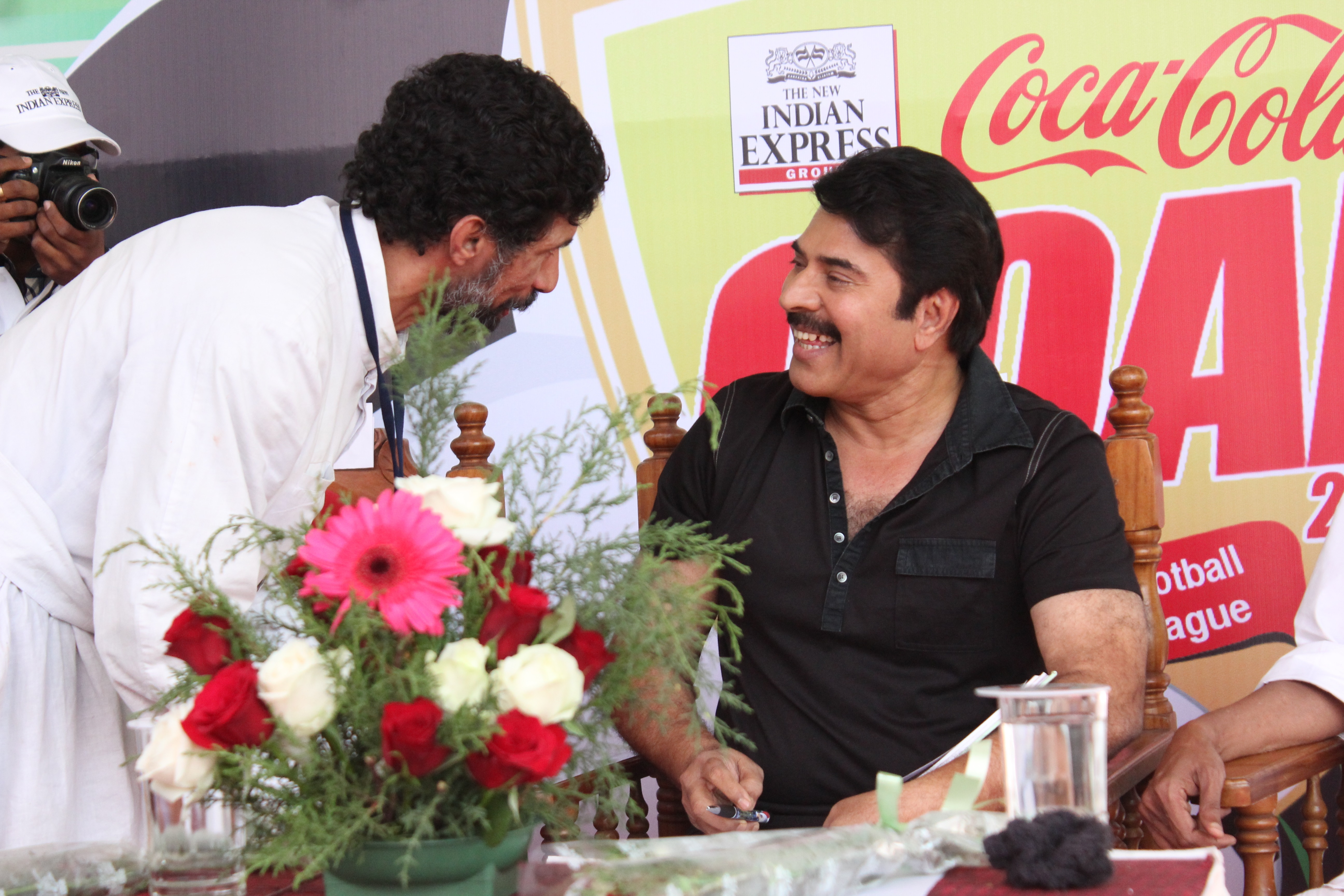
Mammootty with Father Prasant Palakkappilly at Sacred Heart College where he completed his Pre degree.

Mammootty was born on 7 September 1951 in Chandiroor. He was raised in the village of Chempu near Vaikom in Kottayam district in the present-day state of Kerala, India in a middle-class Muslim family. His father, Ismail, had a wholesale garment and rice business and was involved in rice cultivation. His mother, Fatima, was a housewife. He is their eldest son. He has two younger brothers, Ibrahimkutty and Zakariah, and three younger sisters, Ameena, Sauda and Shafina.

He went to Government High School, Kulasekharamangalam, Kottayam for his primary education. In the 1960s, his father moved the family to Kochi, where he attended Government School Ernakulam. He did his pre-university course (pre-degree) at Sacred Heart College, Thevara. He attended Maharaja's College, Ernakulam, for his degree. He graduated with an LL.B. from Government Law College, Ernakulam. He practised law for two years in Manjeri.

He married Sulfath Kuttyy in 1979 in an arranged marriage. The couple has a daughter Surumi (born 1982), and a son Dulquer Salmaan (born 1983)—also an actor. He resides in Kochi with his family. His younger brother, Ibrahimkutty, has also acted in Malayalam films. His nephews, Maqbool Salmaan and Ashkar Saudan, are Malayalam film and television actors.

== Film career ==
=== 1971–1982: Early career ===
Mammootty made his onscreen debut as an extra in K. S. Sethumadhavan's Anubhavangal Paalichakal (1971) at the age of 20. He made his second appearance in an uncredited role in the 1973 film Kaalachakram, directed by K. Narayanan. He was cast in a small role as a boatman. It was in this film that he said his first dialogue. In 1975, he acted in the theatre drama Sabarmathi. After his graduation from Maharaja's college in 1976, Mammootty began his practice as a lawyer in Manjeri. During this time, he met his mentor M. T. Vasudevan Nair, who cast him in a pivotal role in Devalokam (1979). However, due to financial constraints and conflicts among cast and crew, the film stopped shooting halfway. As the film did not get a release Vasudevan Nair cast him in a minor role in Vilkkanundu Swapnangal (1980), directed by Azad and scripted by Nair, his first credited role.

During the filming of Vilkkanundu Swapnangal, Mammootty met and got closer to Sreenivasan. When K. G. George was looking for a newcomer with a "smart and handsome personality" as a daredevil motorcycle jumper for his film Mela (1980), Sreenivasan suggested Mammooty's name while they were shooting at the Raymon circus at Ernakulam. Mela was the first Malayalam film to feature him in a prominent role. He was then cast in a supporting role in Vijayachithra Combines' big budget action film Sphodanam (1981), directed by P. G. Vishwambharan. He was credited as "Sajin" in the film as Vishwanbharan felt that the name "Mammootty" did not suit an actor. The same year, he made his first-ever appearance as a lead actor in the Malayalam film Thrishna (1981), which won the Filmfare Award for Best Film. Later that year, he appeared in a supporting role in I. V. Sasi's political film Ahimsa (1981), which earned him the Kerala State Film Award for Second Best Actor.

The next year, he starred alongside Bharath Gopy in K. G. George's epoch making Yavanika (1982), as a police inspector who is on the search for an unpopular tabla player of a travelling drama group who suddenly disappears. Jijo Punnoose experimented Mammootty in a negative role in the epic period drama Padayottam (1982). I. V. Sasi cast him in a pivotal role in John Jaffer Janardhanan (1982), the Malayalam remake of Manmohan Desai's Hindi film Amar Akbar Anthony (1977). He was then cast in a major supporting role in Sasi's political drama Ee Nadu (1982), which was a major commercial success, becoming the highest grossing South Indian film of the year. Mammootty played supporting roles in most of the films released during the year. He had 23 of his films released during the year.

=== 1983–1986: Experimentation and breakthrough ===
In 1983, he started to transition into leading roles. Balu Kiriyath experimented with Mammootty by casting him as the lead in the comedy drama Visa, which was declared a hit at the box office. In his next film, Sandhyakku Virinja Poovu, directed by P. G. Vishwambaran, he played the role of a libertine lawyer who takes up the case of a female physician who is charged with medical negligence. The film became a major commercial success, running for 250 days in theatres. A critic of The Indian Express wrote, "Seema, as Dr. Bala gives a stand out performance, being particularly impressive in highly emotional sequences. She is matched in acting by Mammootty, who is advocate Jayamohan." In 2017, The Times of India described Mammootty's role as one of the "astounding advocate roles he has given life to". Sandhyakku Virinja Poovu is credited with solidifying Mammootty's status as a leading man. He then starred in Vishwambaran's Pinnilavu, a film about a fight of ethics between a father and son. A multi starrer, it was also a commercial success, running for 150 days in theatres. He then appeared in a supporting role in K. G. George's controversial classic Lekhayude Maranam Oru Flashback. In the film, Mammootty plays the role of a film superstar, a character modelled after Prem Nazir. On 15 May 1983, Sreedhar Pillai of India Today wrote, "Mammootty, the current rage of the Malayalam screen, successfully apes the mannerisms of fellow actor Prem Nazir in his Prem Sagar role."

He then starred as an antihero in P. Padmarajan's classic Koodevide. In the film, he plays the role of a jealous and possessive lover of a boarding school teacher. The film was a major commercial success. Anandu Suresh of The Indian Express wrote, "Mammootty here adeptly navigated a range of emotions. But particularly impressive was his depiction of Thomas' jealousy, triggered by Alice's close bond with one of her students, a mother-son-like one which Thomas misconstrues as romantic. Mammootty skillfully showcased Thomas' descent into villainy, capturing his character's sinister demeanour and willingness to go the extra mile to win Alice's affection just for himself." His pairing with Suhasini was very successful and was continued in films like Ente Upasana (1984). Koodevide was also selected for screening in that year's Indian Panorama. It also won the Kerala State Award for Best Film with Popular Appeal and Aesthetic Value. He then collaborated with director Joshiy for the first time for Aa Raathri. Despite mixed critical response, it was a commercial success. It had a very successful soundtrack, credited with launching Ilaiyaraaja's Malayalam film career. Critics consider Aa Rathri to be a trendsetter. It is regarded to be the first of the Kutty Petty films, tear-jerker family-drama tragedy of the 1980s. Films of this genre typically featured a happy family in the beginning, with a well-placed husband-cum-father, a young mother and a girl child of the age of 3 or 4. In the end, the family gets into a whirlpool of relationship problems. Other notable releases of the year were supporting roles in Fazil's Eettillam and I. V. Sasi's political Iniyenkilum. Reviewing Iniyenkilum for India Today, Sreedhar Pillai wrote, "Mammootty easily outshines everyone else as the villainous politician."

In 1984, he starred as the smuggler Tharadas in I. V. Sasi's Athirathram. The film achieved considerable commercial success and the character of Tharadas gained a cult following among the youth. Mammootty, who was considered a bankable leading actor was propelled to superstardom with the success of the film. Owing to the popularity of the character, it was reprised by Mammootty in Balram vs Tharadas (2006). He then starred in I. V. Sasi's Kanamarayathu, an adaptation of the 1912 novel Daddy-Long-Legs by Jean Webster. In the film he plays the role of the sole successor of a rich business empire who falls for an orphan girl younger than him. Kanamarayathu explores the concept of relationships between couples with a large disparity in their ages, which challenged Indian social mores. Upon release the film received critical acclaim and became a commercial success. For his performance as Roy Varghese, Mammootty won his first Kerala Film Critics Association Award for Best Actor. The film has over the years accumulated a cult following and is now considered a classic in Malayalam cinema. He then starred as a police officer in Bharathan's Ithiri Poove Chuvannapoove. The film explores the relationship between a police officer and his younger brother, who becomes a Naxalite. It was a critical success and had a successful soundtrack.

He then appeared in a supporting role in the art house film, Akkare. In the film he portrays a non resident Malayali. The film is a satirical take on the obsession, especially of the middle class of other's lifestyle. He then starred as a vengeful fisherman back from prison in I. V. Sasi's Adiyozhukkukal. The film was a commercial and critical success. Mammootty won his first Kerala State Film Award for Best Actor and his first Filmfare Award for Best Actor – Malayalam for his performance as Karunan. Mammootty's performance in the film is often considered one of the best in his early career. The film was produced by Casino Productions, a production company owned by Century Kochumon, Mohanlal, I. V. Sasi, and Mammootty. He also starred in I. V. Sasi's Aalkkoottathil Thaniye, a box office hit. In 1988, film scholar Vasanthi Shankaranarayanan wrote, "Aalkkottathil Thaniye shows the changing image of woman in contemporary Malayalam cinema. From weak and enslaved to strong and independent." Aalkkottathil Thaniye, the screenplay was released as a book by DC Books in 2009. That year he also starred in several Kutty Petty films that received negative critical reviews but were successful at the box office, notable of which were Sandarbham, Koottinilamkili and Chakkarayumma. The former of which was a major box office hit, running for 150 days in theatres. It was one of the highest-grossing films of the year. The genre had now become synonymous with Mammootty, being renamed the Mammootty-Kutty-Petty film.

The following year, he starred in Padmarajan's Thinkalaazhcha Nalla Divasam, based on the radio drama Ammaykku Vendi by Sajini Pavithran, in which he plays the role of a man who wants to sell his ancestral house and put his mother in an old age home. The film explores the layers of family relationship in a rural setting threatened by urban culture and explains how the imminent breakdown of the joint family is prevented by a death. Upon release, the film was critically acclaimed, winning the National Film Award for Best Feature Film in Malayalam that year. He then starred in I. V. Sasi's Anubandham, scripted by M. T. Vasudevan Nair, the film was released to widespread critical acclaim, winning four Kerala State Film Awards that year. He collaborated with Nair and Sasi once again that year with Karimbinpoovinakkare, in which he played the role of Shivan, who in a state of rage kills his best friend due to a misunderstanding and explores how he repents for his sin. The film was a commercial success.

He then, starred as Ravi Varma, a millionaire on death row for killing his wife in Joshiy's Nirakkoottu. The film was a major critical and commercial success, becoming one of the highest-grossing films of that year. The film won the Filmfare Award for Best Malayalam film. He then starred as a forest officer who is mistaken for a Naxalite, arrested and jailed for many years in Balu Mahendra's romantic drama Yathra. The film tells a fictional story but is built upon the human rights violations by the police and the prison authorities in India during the emergency of 1975–1977, when the fundamental rights of the citizens were suspended. It is an adaptation of the 1977 Japanese classic The Yellow Handkerchief. The film was released to widespread critical acclaim, winning the Kerala State Film Award for Best Film with Popular Appeal and Aesthetic Value. It was declared a blockbuster, running for 200 days in theatres, becoming the highest grossing Malayalam film of the year. For his performance, Mammootty won the Filmfare Best Actor Award for his performance in Yathra, as well as a Special Jury Award for his performances in both Yathra and Nirakkoottu.

In 1986 alone, he acted in about 35 films, including a brief appearance in Mazha Peyyunnu Maddalam Kottunnu. In 1986, he teamed up with I. V. Sasi for the film Aavanazhi, which was written by T. Damodaran. Mammootty appears in the lead role as Balram, a police officer. Both Inspector Balram and Balram vs. Tharadas are sequels to this film. The film was a huge hit at the box office. The film ran for over 200 days. The film was remade in Tamil, Telugu, and Hindi.

=== 1987–1990 ===
Following a series of flops, Mammootty found commercial success with the crime thriller New Delhi (1987), directed by Joshiy and written by Dennis Joseph. He played G. Krishnamoorthy, a victimised journalist who systematically arranges the killing of politicians who had implicated him under false charges. New Delhi was a commercial success, becoming the highest-grossing Malayalam film released at that point. After its release, Rajinikanth, wanting to remake the film in Tamil, offered to buy the rights from Joseph, but the rights for Kannada, Telugu and Hindi-language remakes were already sold by that time. In the same year, he played Balagopalan, a school teacher who is deemed mad by society owing to a superstitious belief, in the drama Thaniyavarthanam, directed by Sibi Malayil and written by A. K. Lohithadas. It won the Filmfare Award for Best Film – Malayalam at the Filmfare Awards South. Mammootty's performance received acclaim from film critics.

In the first of his several releases in 1988, Mammootty appeared in the comedy film Manu Uncle, directed by Dennis Joseph. Mohanlal and Suresh Gopi made cameo appearances in the film. It received the National Film Award for Best Children's Film at the 36th National Film Awards. Mammootty played an investigator called Sethurama Iyer in another film, Oru CBI Diary Kurippu, which served as the first instalment in the CBI series. The film set box office records both in Kerala and Tamil Nadu. The film's one-year theatrical run in Tamil Nadu continues to remain an all-time record. That year, he also appeared in the Sibi Malayil-directed action film August 1, which was based on the novel The Day of the Jackal, by Frederick Forsyth. The film's rights were sold in Tamil Nadu for a record-breaking price at the time. Additionally, Mammootty and I. V. Sasi worked together on three projects in the same year: the romantic film Abkari, the drama Mukthi and the war film 1921. In the latter, Mammootty played Khader, a World War I veteran who joins the Malabar rebellion. The film, which cost over ₹1.2 crore to produce, earned ₹2 crore during its theatrical run. In 1988, Mammootty collaborated with Joshiy for two films, Sangham and Thanthram.

The following year, Mammootty starred with Rahman and Shobana in the G. S. Vijayan thriller film Charithram. The story is adapted from the English movie Chase a Crooked Shadow. The story is about the relationship between two brothers. In the same year, he acted in a film which is considered as one of the best crime thriller in Malayalam cinema, Adikkurippu, written by S. N. Swamy and directed by K. Madhu. In 1989, Mammootty starred in the lead as Chandu Chekavar, in the epic historical drama film Oru Vadakkan Veeragatha, directed by Hariharan and written by M. T. Vasudevan Nair. The movie has won four National Film Awards, including Best Actor(Mammootty), Best Screenplay(M.T Vasudevan Nair), Best Production Design and Best Costume Design(P. Krishnamoorthy). The movie has selected as Best Malayalam Movie in Filmfare Awards, also the movie has won seven Kerala State Film Awards. The movie received both commercial and critical acclaim and ran for over 300 days. It is considered as one of the greatest films of all time. In an online poll conducted in 2013 by IBN Live, as a part of Indian Cinema completing 100 years, Oru Vadakkan Veeragatha listed as the third greatest Indian Film of all time. In the same year, Mammootty starred with Sukumaran in the Mystery-thriller film Utharam, written by M. T. Vasudevan Nair. The story was based on the short story No Motive by Daphne du Maurier. Utharam is considered as one of the best investigate thrillers in Malayalam cinema. Second movie in CBI (film series), Jagratha released in the same year. It is considered as one of the best investigate thrillers in Malayalam. In the same year Mammootty joined with Joshiy, in the movie Mahayanam, which was a critical and commercial success. In 1989, Mammootty appeared as hunter in Mrigayaa, Directed by I. V. Sasi and written by A. K. Lohithadas. The movie was a major success and I.V Sasi won the Kerala State Award for Best Director. In 1989, Mammootty won the Best Actor Award in Kerala State Film Awards for the movies Oru Vadakkan Veeragatha, Mrigayaa and Mahayanam.

In 1990, he starred in Kottayam Kunjachan, an action comedy film directed by T. S. Suresh Babu and written by Dennis Joseph. The movie has become one of the highest-grossing film in the year. Mammootty played the role Kunjachan which is a character from the novel Veli written by Muttathu Varkey. Mammootty made his Tamil debut the same year with Mounam Sammadham. N. Krishnaswamy of The Indian Express wrote, "Mammootty plays the no-nonsense hero in the film with such dignity, poise and grace." Mammootty won Best Actor Award in National Film Award in 1990 for the movie Oru Vadakkan Veeragatha and Mathilukal. The film focuses on the prison life of Vaikom Muhammad Basheer and the love between him and Narayani, a female inmate of the prison, who remains unseen throughout the film. The movie was critically acclaimed and considered as the best classics of Malayalam Cinema. The movie has won four National Film Awards. When Indian cinema completed 100 years, Forbes included the performance of Mammootty in the list "25 Greatest Acting Performances of Indian Cinema". Mammootty appeared as Alexander in the 1990 in a Gangster film Samrajyam, directed by Jomon with music composed by Ilaiyaraaja. The movie was commercially a major success in Kerala and Andhra Pradesh box-offices. The movie has run for more than 200 days in Kerala and 400 days in Andhra Pradesh. In 1990, Mammootty was part of No.20 Madras Mail directed by Joshiy. Mammootty played a cameo role as himself and Mohanlal was in the lead role.

=== 1991–1994 ===
In 1991, he starred in Amaram, directed by Bharathan and written by A. K. Lohithadas. Mammootty played the character Achootty, an uneducated fisherman who wants his daughter to be educated and wants her to become a doctor. The role helped Mammootty to grab another Filmfare award for Best actor. In the same year he did two Tamil films Thalapathi and Azhagan, which were both commercially successful. In the same year, Mammootty joined with I.V Sasi for two movies, Inspector Balram and Neelagiri. Inspector Balram was a sequel to his 1986 film Aavanazhi. The movie was commercially successful. In 1992, he acted with Kannada actor Vishnuvardhan in the action thriller movie Kauravar. Mammootty played the character Putturumees in the movie Soorya Manasam, who is a mentally challenged man who lives with his mother in a small village. Mammootty was critically acclaimed for the role and the movie is based on 1937 American Novel Of Mice and Men by John Steinbeck. Sowcar Janaki played the character of his mother. In the same year, he acted in the movie Pappayude Swantham Appoos, directed and written by Fazil. The movie explores the relationship between a father and son. The film was both a commercial and critical success and ran for more than 200 days. Mammootty made his entry to Telugu industry through Swathi Kiranam in the year 1992.

In 1993, Mammootty joined with Joshiy for an Action film Dhruvam. It was Vikram's debut to Malayalam cinema. The film was a super hit at the box-office. In the same year Mammootty won the Kerala State Film Award for Best Actor and for the movie Vatsalyam directed by Cochin Haneefa, Ponthan Mada directed by T. V. Chandran, and Vidheyan directed and written by Adoor Gopalakrishnan. He also won theNational Film Award for Best Actor for the movies Ponthan Mada and Vidheyan in the same year. Mammootty also did a Tamil movie Kilipetchu Ketkava, directed by Fazil. Mammootty made his Bollywood debut with the 1993 release Dhartiputra

=== 1995–1999 ===
In 1995, writer Sreenivasan and director Kamal created the character Nandakumar Varma, who is a college professor in the romantic drama Mazhayethum Munpe. He acted as an aggressive yet honourable District Collector Thevalliparambil Joseph Alex IAS in his following release, a political thriller film The King. It became the highest-grossing Malayalam film at that time. In the same year, he starred in the Tamil political thriller Makkal Aatchi, directed by R. K. Selvamani and produced by Thirupur A. Selvaraj under Aarthi International. The film's music was composed by Ilaiyaraaja. The film was also dubbed in Malayalam as Ente Naadu. The movie was clashed with Rajinikanth starrer Muthu at the same time and Mammootty took the lead over Rajinikanth in Tamil Nadu. Mammootty's first Malayalam release of 1996 was Azhakiya Ravanan, a romantic drama directed by Kamal and written by Sreenivasan. His next film was Hitler, written and directed by Siddique, which was remade in several languages due to its commercial success at the box office. It was the highest grossing Malayalam movie, breaking his own record made by The King at that time. The movie ran over 300 days in theatres. He also did a direct Telugu movie in the same year Surya Putrulu, directed by C. Umamaheswara Rao. The film was a moderate success at the box office.

In 1997 Mammootty won the Best Actor Award in Filmfare Awards for the performance in the movie Bhoothakkannadi, directed by Lohithadas. It is considered as one of the finest performances in his career. In an interview, Mammootty revealed that he wanted to direct the movie with Rajinikanth in lead. In the same year Mammootty done two Tamil films Pudhayal, directed by Selva and Arasiyal, directed by R. K. Selvamani. In 1998, Mammootty played the role of an IPS officer in the investigation thriller film The Truth, written by S. N. Swamy and directed by Shaji Kailas. He played the lead role in Oru Maravathoor Kanavu, which was the directorial debut of Lal Jose in 1998. In the same year, he starred in Harikrishnans, co-starring Mohanlal and Juhi Chawla. The movie has two climaxes, and Shah Rukh Khan was supposed to do a pivotal role, but didn't happen for unknown reasons. in the same year, Mammootty done a guest appearance in the Bollywood movie Swami Vivekananda, directed by G. V. Iyer.

In 1999, Mammootty won the Best Actor in National Film Awards for the movie Dr. Babasaheb Ambedkar, directed by Jabbar Patel. The performance is considered as one of the finest one in his career. The movie is produced by National Film Development Corporation. Mammootty joined with Priyadarshan in the same year for the movie Megham, which is a commercial success.

=== 2000–2009 ===
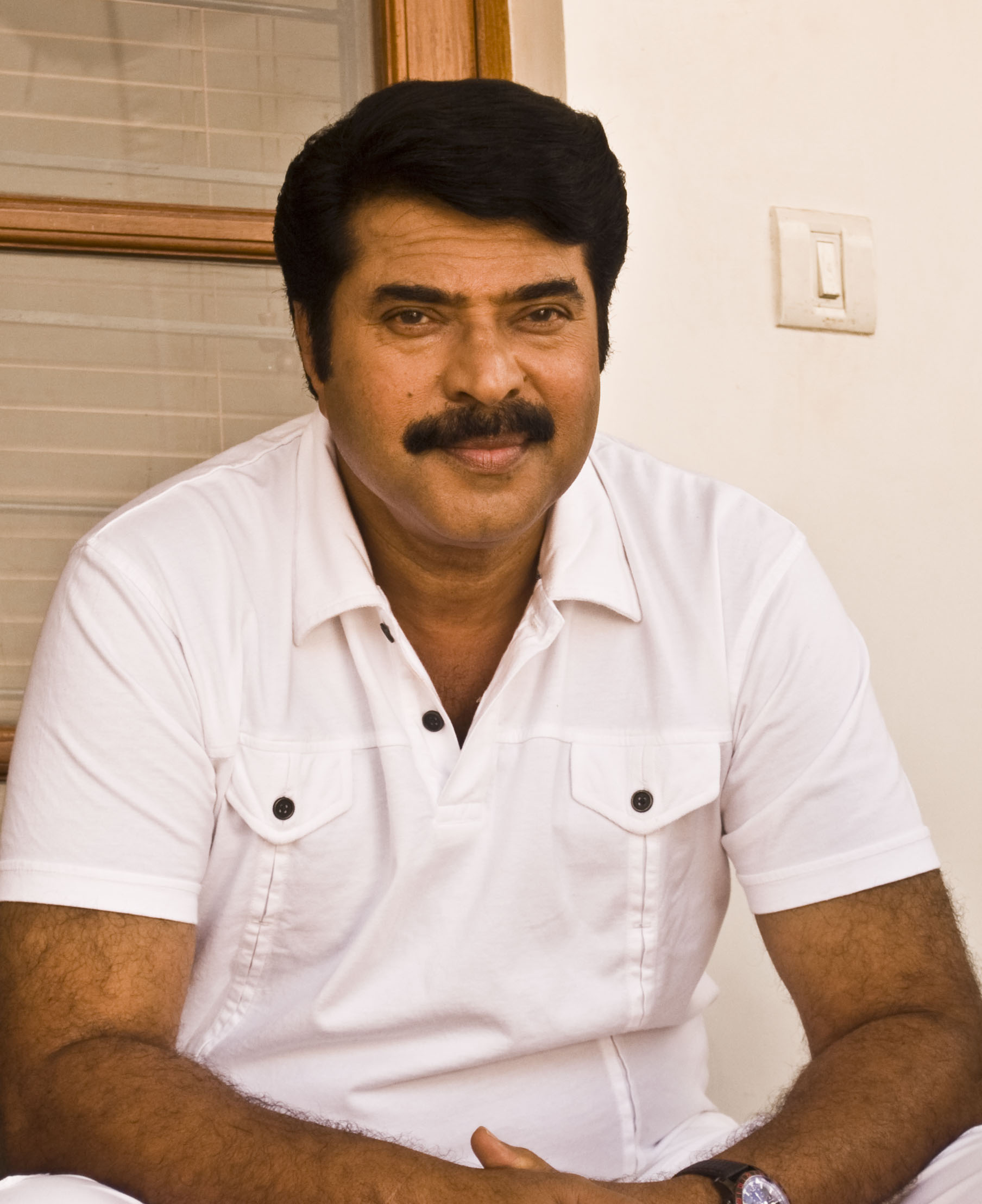
Mammootty in 2009

In 2000, Mammootty did a cameo role in Narasimham, in which Mohanlal did the main role. The movie was a huge success at the boxoffice. With the huge success of Narasimham, director Shaji Kailas, joined with Mammootty in the same year for another action drama Valliettan. The movie was also a huge success in box office. 2000 was one of the best year for the actor in box office performance, after the huge success of Narasimham and Valliettan, Mammootty continued the success with the movies Dada Sahib and Tamil movie Kandukondain Kandukondain, co-starring Ajith Kumar and Aishwarya Rai. Both movies were blockbuster in box office. Mammootty won the Best Actor Award in Filmfare Awards in 2000 for his performance in Arayannangalude Veedu. He continued his box office reign in 2001 too. In the year, he began with Rakshasa Rajavu, directed by Vinayan. The movie was a huge success in box office. He has done the lead role in N. Lingusamy directorial debut Aanandham in the same year. The movie was a commercial and critical success.

In 2003, Mammootty played Sathyaprathapan, a bachelor in romantic comedy Drama Film Chronic Bachelor, directed by Siddique. The film received positive reviews and became a commercial success at the box office. Mammootty also acted in Pattalam, by director Lal Jose, in which he plays an Indian Army officer, Major Pattabhiraman. The movie made an average performance in the box office. In 2004, he acted in the third instalment of CBI, Sethurama Iyer CBI. The movie has become the second highest-grossing movie of the year. Mammootty won Kerala State Film Awards and Filmfare awards for Best Actor for the performance in the movie Kaazhcha. The movie was the directorial debut of Blessy. The movie got many critical receptions from all over. In the same year he appeared as a police officer in Ranjith movie Black. The movie was a box office hit. After this action film, he appeared as a family man in Vesham, who sacrifice his life for his younger brother.

2005 was one of the best year for the actor in both box office and in performance. He was seen in never seen characters in the movies like Thommanum Makkalum, Thaskaraveeran and Rajamanikyam. In this, Rajamanikyam was industry hit. The movie has created and broke many records in the box office. The actor was seen in a never seen character. Other releases were Rappakal, Nerariyan CBI which is the fourth instalment of CBI (film series) and Bus Conductor. These movies all made money in box office. The characters in each film were different from one another. The actor was totally controlling the box office in the year. In 2006, the actor continues his performance in box office and was utmost care in choosing the character. Mammootty started the year with action comedy film Thuruppugulan, which was a super hit in box office. The next release was Balram vs. Tharadas, which was the sequel of Athirathram and Inspector Balram. Katrina Kaif played the female lead in the movie and the only Malayalam movie she acted. At the end of the year actor changed to do off-beat movies such as Karutha Pakshikal and Palunku. The actor was nominated in the National Awards for Best actor at the year. He won the Best Actor in Filmfare Awards for the movie Karutha Pakshikal.

He started 2007 with the off-beat film Kaiyoppu. Then he back with the comedy action film Mayavi, directed by Shafi. The movie became the highest grosser in the state in the year. The next was Big B, which was the directorial debut of Amal Neerad. The movie was an average grosser in box office but still manages to completes more than 100 days in Kerala box office. After the release of the DVD of the movie the movie got many appreciation for the cinematography and editing. The movie redefined how to make a mass action movie to be made in Mollywood. Mammootty won the appreciation for the slow-motion walking and the background music is still trending. In the year the actor shown his box office and performance power in the movie Katha Parayumpol. He done an extended cameo role in the movie. The movie was remade in three languages, Kuselan in Tamil, Billu Barber in Hindi and Kathanayakudu. All the remakes failed in the respective box office. Mammootty was appraised for his performance in the movie.

He begin 2008 with action film Roudram, directed by Renji Panicker. Mammootty joined with Anwar Rasheed after the industrial hit Rajamanikyam. This time for the comedy action movie Annan Thampi. The movie was a superhit in the boxoffice. The movie done a huge business all over. Telegu rights has sold for a record price until that time. His next releases were Parunthu, Mayabazar. He done a cameo role in One Way Ticket in which Prithviraj Sukumaran done the lead role. These movies didn't done any boxoffice wonders. After that he did the lead role in the biggest multistar movie in Malayalam Twenty:20, directed by Joshiy. In 2009, he done the all-time blockbuster epic period drama film Kerala Varma Pazhassi Raja, written by M. T. Vasudevan Nair and directed by Hariharan. the film has collected around 49cr in box office. He also done performance oriented movies like Kerala Cafe and Paleri Manikyam. He won Best Actor Award in both Kerala State Film Awards and Filmfare Awards for the movie Paleri Manikyam. In the same year he done the action comedy film Chattambinadu, another performance oriented movie Loudspeaker and the directorial debut of Aashiq Abu, Daddy Cool. These movie has done Hit status in boxoffice.

=== 2010–2019 ===
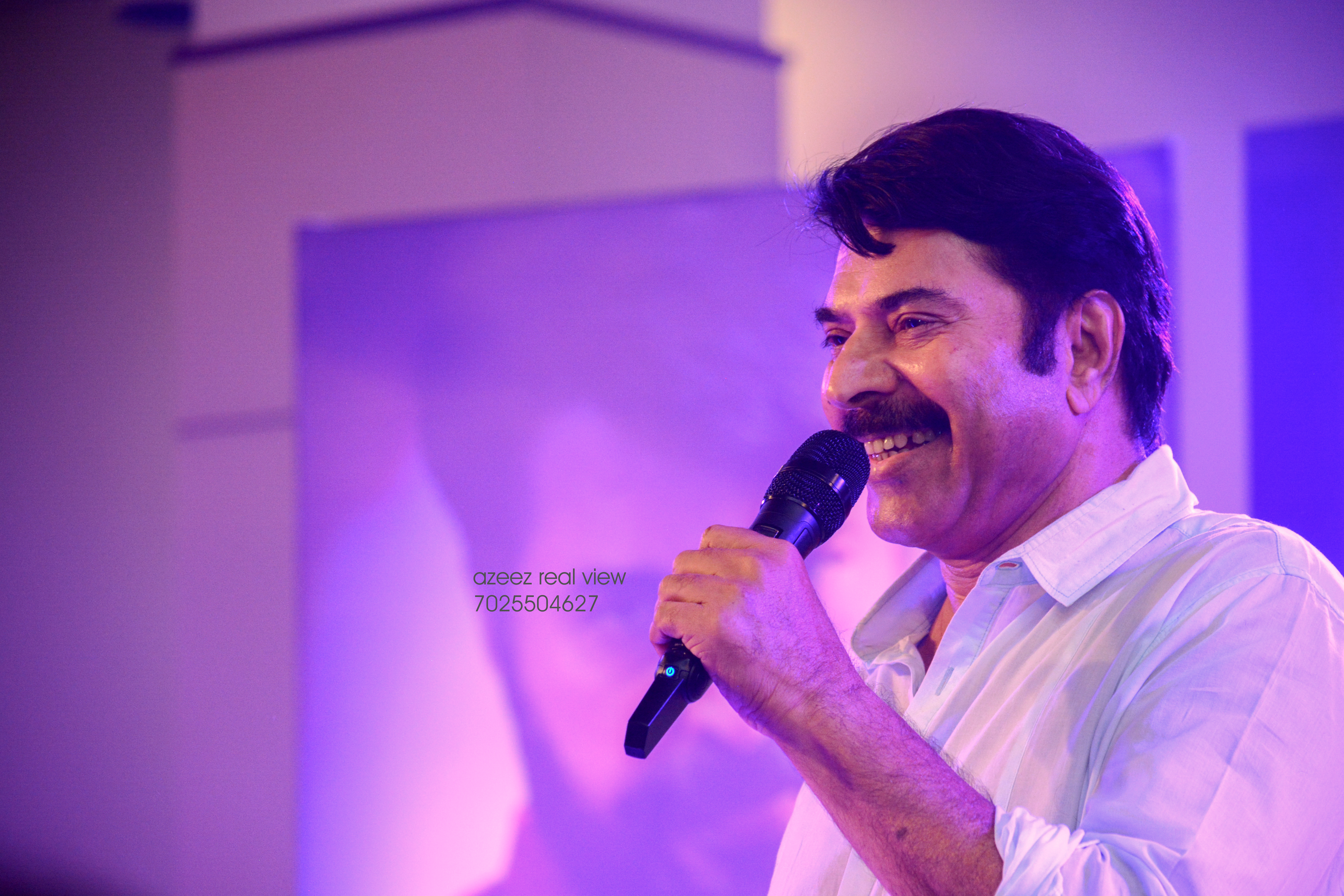
Mammootty at Successful party of Abrahaminte Santhathikal

In the year 2010, Mammootty acted in the films Drona 2010, directed by Shaji Kailas, Yugapurushan, directed by R. Sukumaran, Pramaani, directed by B. Unnikrishnan, Pokkiri Raja, the directorial debut of Vysakh Abraham, Kutty Srank, directed by Shaji N. Karun, Pranchiyettan & the Saint, directed by Ranjith, Best of Luck, directed by M. A. Nishad and Best Actor, Martin Prakkat's debut film.

His films August 15, directed by Shaji Kailas, Doubles, directed by Sohan Seenulal, The Train, directed by Jayaraj, Bombay March 12, directed by Babu Janardhanan and Venicile Vyaapari, directed by Shafi appeared in 2011.

In 2012, his films included: The King & the Commissioner, directed by Shaji Kailas, the Kannada-Malayalam bilingual film Shikari directed by Abhaya Simha, Cobra, directed by Lal, Thappana, directed by Johny Antony, Jawan of Vellimala, directed by Anoop Kannan, (Mammootty produced the film), Face to Face, directed by V. M. Vinu and Bavuttiyude Namathil, directed by G. S. Vijayan.

His first films released in 2013 were Kammath & Kammath, directed by Thomson and Immanuel, directed by Lal Jose. Later, he went on to appear in Kadal Kadannoru Mathukkutty, directed by Ranjith, which was released for Ramzan season, Kunjananthante Kada, directed by Salim Ahamed and Daivathinte Swantham Cleetus, directed by G. Marthandan. His next release was Silence, directed by V. K. Prakash.

He acted in Balyakalasakhi, directed by Pramod Payyannur, Praise the Lord, directed by Shibu Gangadharan and Gangster, directed by Aashiq Abu in the first half of 2014. He also acted in: Manglish, directed by Salam Bappu, Munnariyippu, directed by Venu, RajadhiRaja, directed by debutant Ajai Vasudev and Varsham, directed by Ranjith Sankar. Mammootty received critical praise for his portrayal of C.K. Raghavan in Munnariyippu, while Sify called RajadhiRaja "a genuine hit for Mammootty after a long time". Nicy V.P. of International Business Times wrote: "Varsham is a movie worth investing your time and money."

His 2015 releases were Fireman, directed by Deepu Karunakaran, Bhaskar the Rascal, directed by Siddique, a commercial success, Acha Dhin, directed by Marthandan. Utopiayile Rajavu, directed by Kamal and Pathemari, directed by Salim Ahamed.

He acted in Puthiya Niyamam alongside Nayanthara directed by A. K. Sajan in the first half of 2016. He also acted in Kasaba directed by debutant director Nithin Renji Paniker. His next releases for the year was White directed by Uday Ananthan and Thoppil Joppan, directed by Johny Antony marking their fourth collaboration.

In 2017, his first release was The Great Father directed by debutant Haneef Adeni. He was then seen in Puthan Panam directed by Ranjith, Pullikkaran Staraa directed by Syamdhar and Masterpiece directed by Ajai Vasudev.

In 2018, he acted in Parole directed by debutant Sharrath Sandith. He has then seen in Uncle written by Joy Mathew and directed by debutant Girish Damodar. His next release was Abrahaminte Santhathikal, a crime thriller directed by debutant Shaji Padoor. His last release for the year was Oru Kuttanadan Blog directed and written by Sethu. In 2018, he acted in critically acclaimed Tamil movie Peranbu directed by Ram. It was selected for Rotterdam Film Festival, Shanghai International Film Festival and International Film Festival of India. His role of single parent Amudhavan who struggles with raising his spastic girl child, Paapa was well appreciated by critics.

His first release of 2019 was Madhura Raja, a spin-off to the 2010 film Pokkiri Raja directed by Vysakh. It becomes the best-grossing film in Mammootty's career. His next release was Unda directed by Khalid Rahman in which he played the role of a Sub-inspector of Police who led the team of a police unit for state election duty in a Maoist prone area in Chhattisgarh. He was then seen in an extended cameo in the film Pathinettam Padi directed by Shankar Ramakrishnan. Later in the year, Mammootty was in the historical drama Mamangam directed by M. Padmakumar, which is based on the historical Mamankam festival in the banks of the Bharathappuzha. He was also in Ramesh Pisharody's Ganagandharvan in which he plays a 'ganamela' singer named Kalasadhan Ullas and Ajai Vasudev's Shylock. After two decades, Mammootty returned to Telugu cinema in 2019 with the biopic Yatra which is based on former Andhra Pradesh chief minister YS Rajasekhar Reddy directed by Mahi Raghav.

=== 2020–present ===
In 2021, He starred in The Priest, directed by Jofin T. Chacko featuring Manju Warrier marking her first collaboration with Mammootty. He then starred in the political thriller One, directed by Santhosh Vishwanath. He played Kadakkal Chandran, Chief Minister of Kerala in the film. In 2022, He starred in Bheeshma Parvam directed by Amal Neerad, which received positive responses and was a blockbuster. He then starred in CBI 5: The Brain, which emerged as a box office success. In 2023, he acted in the Telugu film Agent starring Akhil Akkineni. In 2024, he reprised Y. S. Rajasekhar Reddy in the Tamil film Yatra 2.

Mammootty had four Malayalam releases in 2023: He first appeared in Nanpakal Nerathu Mayakkam, which received critical acclaim for his role which won him the Kerala State Award and Filmfare Award for Best Actor. He then appeared in Christopher and Kannur Squad. He then played the lead in Kaathal – The Core. In 2024, Mammootty appeared in three Malayalam films, Abraham Ozler, Turbo and Bramayugam.

Mammootty's first release in 2025 was Dominic and the Ladies' Purse. He then appeared in Bazooka. Both films underperformed at the box office. In the same year, an AI-generated version of Mammooty was used in the film Rekhachithram without the actor's physical appearance being involved. Also, an arm is shown as the character Moothon in the film Lokah Chapter 1: Chandra, with voiceover of Mammooty. The film became the highest grossing malayalam film of the year.

He then appeared in the Malayalam-language crime thriller Kalamkaval, which was released theatrically on 5 December 2025. The film opened to strong audience interest and maintained steady box office performance in the weeks following its release, emerging as one of the notable Malayalam releases of the year.

Around the same period, Mammootty was cast in the Malayalam political thriller Patriot (2026 Film), directed by Mahesh Narayanan. The film features an ensemble cast including Mohanlal, Fahadh Faasil, Kunchacko Boban and Nayanthara, and is among the major multi-starrer projects in Malayalam cinema during the mid-2020s. Filming began in 2025, with the film being released to mixed reviews on May 1st 2026.

In 2026, Mammootty's Malayalam horror film Bramayugam, directed by Rahul Sadasivan, was selected for a special screening at the Academy Museum of Motion Pictures in Los Angeles on February 12, as part of the "Where the Forest Meets the Sea" series. It was the first film starring Mammootty to be shown at the Academy Museum, drawing international attention to the film's global exhibition.

=== Films in other languages ===
He has acted in Tamil films for directors including K. Balachander's (Azhagan), Mani Ratnam's (Thalapathy), Fazil's (Kilippechu Kekkavaa), N. Linguswamy's (Aanandham), R. K. Selvamani's (Makkal Aatchi), Marumalarchi Bharathi's (Marumalarchi) and Ethirum Puthirum and Rajiv Menon (Kandukondain Kandukondain) (2000). He played Anantha Sharma in K. Viswanath's Telugu film Swathi Kiranam (1992).

== Other work ==
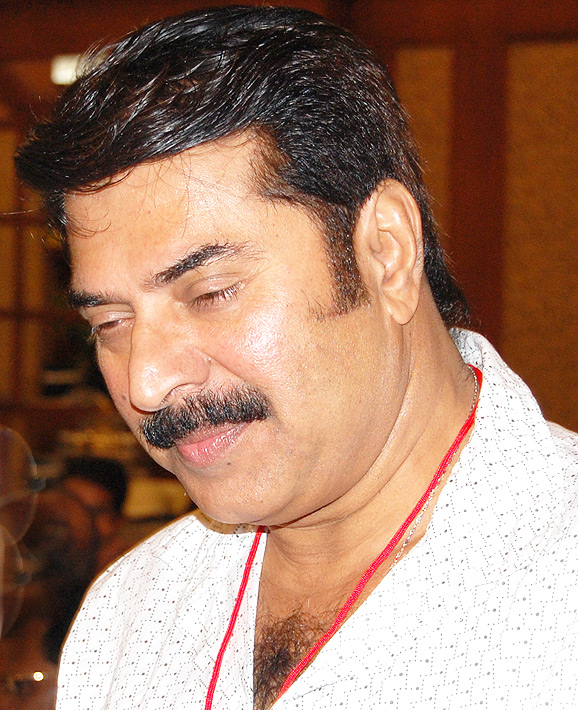
Mammootty at an event for A.M.M.A in 2007

During the 1980s, Mammootty was the co-owner of a production company, Casino, along with Mohanlal, I.V. Sasi, Seema and Century Kochumon. The films it produced included Nadodikkattu (1987), Gandhinagar 2nd Street (1986), Adiyozhukkukal and Karimpin Poovinakkare. He formed a television production company, Megabytes, which produced television serials, the first being Jwalayay in the late 1990s, which was also his first project as a producer.

Mammootty also owns a distribution company named Mammootty Technotainment. He is the owner of Playhouse since 2009, a company which primarily distributes films he has starred in. It has since ventured into film production, with ventures including the Jawan of Vellimala and Street Lights. As of 2010, he is the chairman of Malayalam Communications, which runs some Malayalam TV channels such as Kairali TV, Kairali News and Channel We. In 2021, he founded another production company, the Mammootty Kampany, which produced the films Rorschach (2022) and Nanpakal Nerathu Mayakkam (2022).

He has stated he has no political ambitions. In 2007, Mammootty published his first book, Kazhchapadu (roughly translated as "Perspective"), a compilation of short essays he had written in various publications over the years. That year, he and Dubai-based businessman MA Yousuf Ali lobbied for the proposed Smart City project at Kochi with officials of the Dubai Internet City (DIC).

In August 2021, Mammootty received the UAE Golden Visa.

=== Philanthropic and social causes ===
Mammootty is a patron of the Pain and Palliative Care Society, a charitable organisation in Kerala, that aims to improve the quality of people in advanced stages of cancer. He has been working with the Pain and Palliative Care Centre situated in Kozhikode, India. In 2018, he put forth a project to provide the pain and palliative care to those suffering from cancer throughout Kerala. He is also a patron of the Care and Share International Foundation, a charity organisation aimed at reducing societal inequality. Among its endeavours, the foundation mobilised financial help for the heart surgeries of children with the Hridaya Sparsham project. A fundraiser over social networking sites supported by Mammootty raised about ₹1 crore within a day.

Mammootty is the goodwill ambassador of the charity project Street India Movement, which lists the elimination of child begging and child labour among its goals. He has promoted the activities of the movement, which coordinates with orphanages and institutions looking after the children. He is also goodwill ambassador for Akshaya, the information technology dissemination project of the Government of Kerala. He formally took over the role on 26 February 2006 at a video-telecasted programme that was linked to all district headquarters of the state. He also promotes the anti-drug campaign Addicted to Life, launched by the Government of Kerala and affiliated with the Kerala State Beverages Corporation, which aims to eradicate drugs and alcohol usage among people, especially the youth.

In August 2014, Mammootty launched the My Tree Challenge, modelled after the Ice Bucket Challenge, which purports to encourage others to plant saplings, as the rules dictate that they should if challenged. The challenge was created by Abdul Manaf, an entrepreneur, and Imthias Kadeer, a travel photographer. Mammootty challenged Mohanlal and Shah Rukh Khan to take up the challenge. Kazhcha, organised by Mammootty Fans Welfare Association and Mammootty Times, in association with Little Flower Hospital and Research Centre and the Eye Bank Association of Kerala, is a venture to extend free eye care and treatment. One of the major activities related to this is the distribution of free spectacles to children. A special fund received from the office of the President of India will be utilised for this purpose. Free eye camps will also be conducted at various places in connection with this project.

== Media image and artistry ==
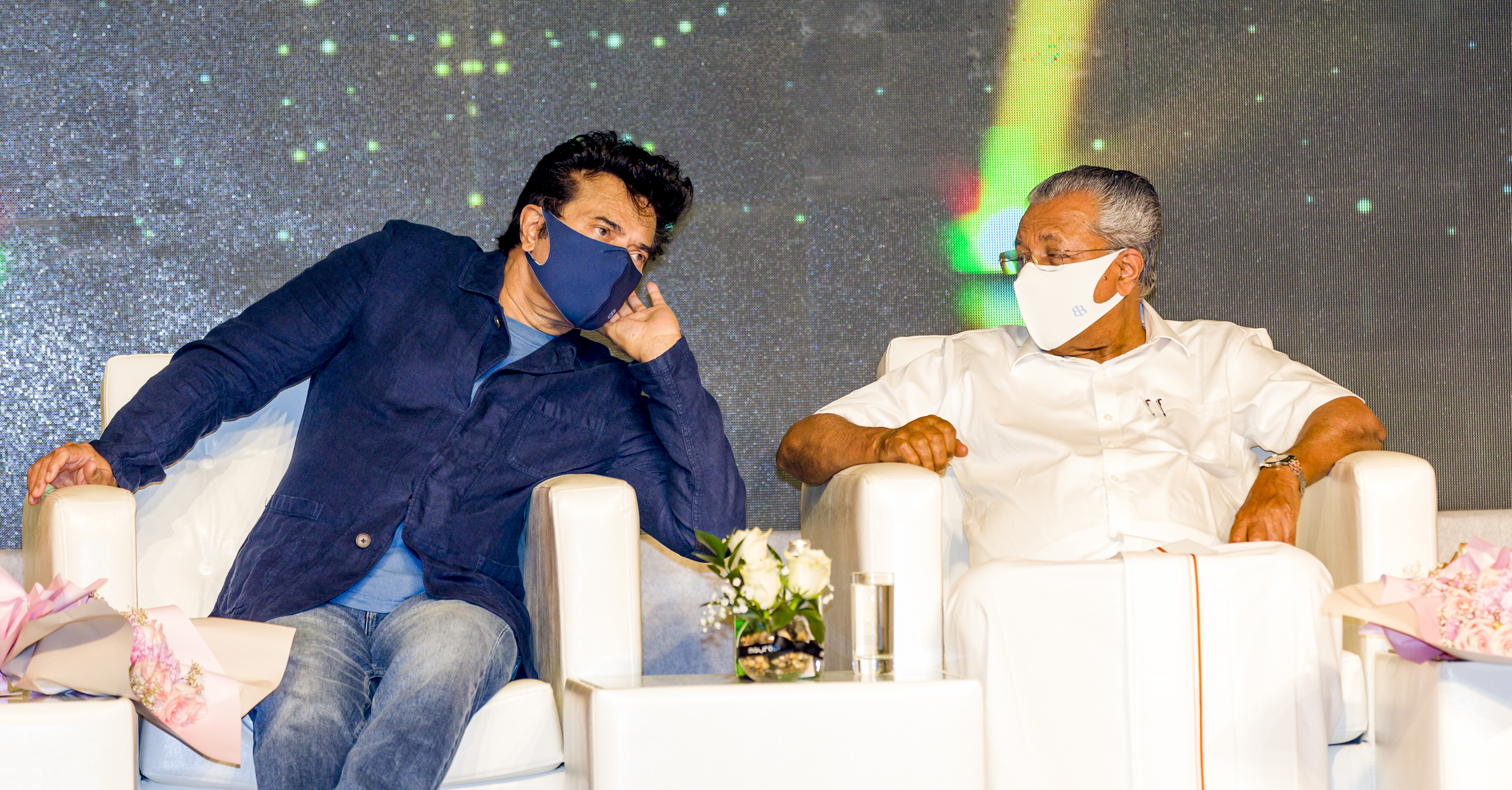
Mammootty and the then Kerala Chief Minister Pinarayi Vijayan in Dubai in 2022

Mammootty has been described in the Indian media as one of the most versatile actors. Unlike other Indian film industries, which saw the emergence of superstars that commanded a great degree of fame and stardom post-Indian independence, Malayalam cinema historically focused on stories that dealt with the lives of ordinary people, and did not generally have superstars, with the possible exception of Prem Nazir. This changed in the 1980s with the growing popularity of Mammootty and Mohanlal. Sreedhar Pillai of India Today wrote in December 1988, "So impregnable is their hold over the industry today that new films are launched only if they have the time."

In 2005, films starring Mammootty, Mohanlal and Dileep accounted for 97 per cent of the box office revenue of Malayalam cinema. The Hindu wrote that "Malayalam cinema revolves around them and scripts are written keeping their age and image in mind", they played larger-than-life characters with distinctive style of attire, dialogues, dance, and fight sequences. During the 2006 IIFA Awards ceremony held at Dubai, he openly criticised the organisers of the IIFA Awards for completely ignoring South Indian film by stating that the Bollywood film industry should stand up to competition from the South Indian film industry before calling itself international.

Mammootty's performance in Mathilukal was listed among the "25 Greatest Acting Performances of Indian Cinema" by Forbes India on the occasion of celebrating 100 years of Indian Cinema. His performance in Munnariyippu is regarded as one of the "100 Greatest Performances of the Decade" by Film Companion. Mammootty was appointed as the brand ambassador of the Thrissur-based South Indian Bank on 16 October 2006. He was also featured as the brand ambassador for Kerala Volleyball League. In 2024, he was placed 63rd on IMDb's List of 100 Most Viewed Indian Stars.

== Discography ==
Year	Track	Album	Composer	Ref.
1995	"Ladies Collegil"	Mazhayethum Munpe	R. Anandh	
1999	"Poliyopoli Pookkula"	Pallavur Devanarayanan	Raveendran	
2009	"Aarandum Koorikootti"	Kutty Srank	Isaac Thomas Kottukapally	
2009	"Manjinte Marala Neengunnu"	Loudspeaker	Bijibal	
2012	"Onnam Kunnumma"	Jawan of Vellimala	Bijibal	
2018	"Entha Johnsa Kallille"	Uncle	Bijibal	

== Accolades ==
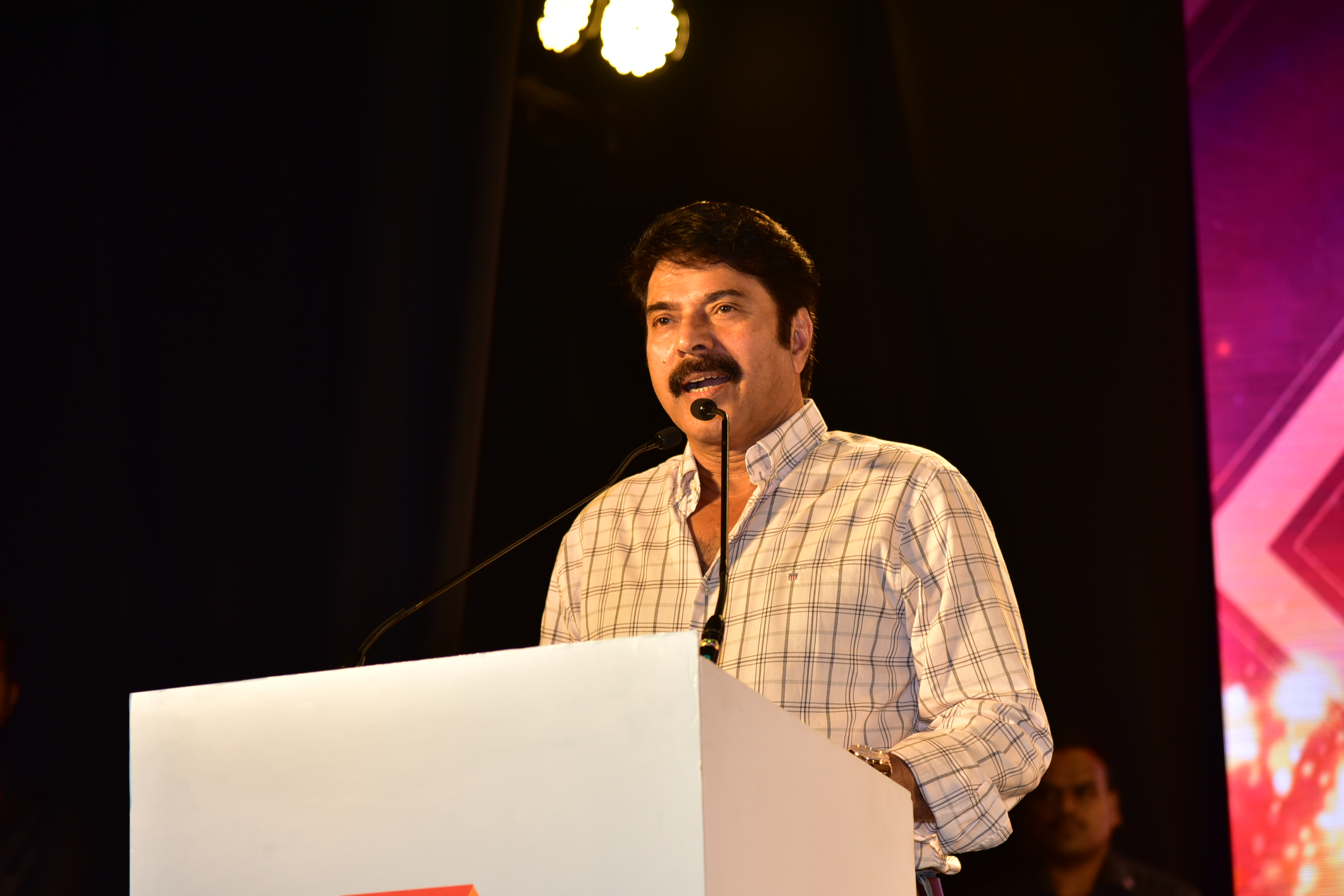
Mammootty speech at Innotech Awards on 2018-07-26 in RavindraBharathi

Mammootty has won four National Film Awards, eleven Kerala State Film Awards, fifteen Filmfare Awards, eleven Kerala Film Critics Awards and five Asianet Film Awards (from fourteen nominations). In 2026, he was honoured with the third-highest civilian award, the Padma Bhushan, by the Government of India for his distinguished service in cinema. Earlier, in 1998, he was honoured with the fourth-highest civilian award, Padma Shri, by the Government of India for his contribution to the Indian film industry. In 2022, he was honoured with Kerala Prabha, the second-highest award conferred by the Government of Kerala. He was conferred with honorary Doctor of Letters degrees by the University of Calicut and the University of Kerala in 2010, and by Mahatma Gandhi University in 2026.
