= V. P. Gangadharan =

Indian oncologist

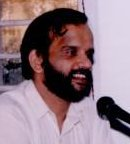
Dr. V. P. Gangadharan

Dr. V. P. Gangadharan (born in 1954) is an Indian oncologist, known for his support to poor and needy cancer patients by providing them with subsidised medicines and free counselling through Cochin Cancer Society. He was the former Head of the Department at Regional Cancer Centre, Thiruvananthapuram. He has undergone training at The Royal Marsden Hospital in Sutton, London and George Washington University Hospital in Washington, D.C. He was massively involved in the formation of Cochin Cancer Society in 2004, by coordinating people having experienced the ordeal of either having a cancer patient in their family or being a survivor of the disease. He is known to be as "Saint with Stethoscope". In 2023, he was honoured with Kerala Sree Award, third highest civilian award given by the Government of Kerala.

== Early life and education ==
Gangadharan was born to a textile engineer M. N. Padmanabhan Nair and Saraswathi Amma in Coimbatore as the youngest of the four siblings.

After completing his pre degree from the Christ College, Irinjalakuda, and graduation from Maharaja's College, Ernakulam, he went to Coimbatore to join his father’s flourishing textile business and his lack of business acumen led him to abandon the business. He then had his medical education at Government Medical College, Kottayam, and at All India Institute of Medical Sciences, New Delhi.

== Awards and recognitions ==
- Kairali Ananthapuri Award 2012 by Ananthapuri Group, Muscat. This award is meant to recognize the personalities who do outstanding performance in the area of social service
- Basheer Award 2015 instituted by the Qatar-based socio-cultural organisation Pravasi Doha
- NSH Global Harmony Award - 2017 - by NSH Global Village Harmony, Kuwait
