= T Madhava Menon =

T. Madhava Menon (Thelakkat Madhava Menon; 19 November 1929 – 12 February 2026) was a former civil servant in the Indian Administrative Service (Kerala Cadre), who held various posts including District Collector, Palakkad; Director of Administration, Central PWD, New Delhi; Custodian of Vested (Nationalised) Forests, Kerala; Director of Tribal Welfare, Kerala; and Vice-Chancellor of Kerala Agricultural University.

After retirement, he was associated with the People of India Project and served as Co-Editor of the volumes related to Kerala. He was a Senior Fellow at the International School of Dravidian Linguistics, where he edited a three-volume Encyclopaedia on Dravidian Tribes. He also edited the two-volume Handbook of Kerala. He was a member of the Governing Council of the Attappady Hill Areas Development Society.

On 1 November 2022, Kerala Piravi Day, the Government of Kerala announced the conferment of the first-ever Kerala Prabha award on T. Madhava Menon in recognition of his social work.

== Selected publications ==
- The Encyclopaedia of Dravidian Tribes, International School of Dravidian Linguistics, 1996 (Editor)
- A Hand Book of Kerala, International School Of Dravidian Linguistics, Thiruvananthapuram, Edited By T. Madhava Menon
- Tribal Development in India: From Despair to Hope, B.R. Publishing Corporation, 2020
- Kerala Pazhama: Antiquity of Kerala, Hermann Gundert, translation into English by T Madhava Menon, International School of Dravidian Linguistics, 2003
- People of India : Kerala : Volume XXVII (3 Parts-Set), edited by T Madhava Menon, Deepak Tyagi and B. Francis Kulirani, 2002
- Keralolpathy, translation into English by T Madhava Menon, International School of Dravidian Linguistics
