= Kilipetchu Ketkavaa =

1993 film directed by Fazil

- Theatrical release poster
- Directed by: Fazil
- Written by: Gokula Krishnan (dialogues)
- Screenplay by: Fazil
- Story by: Fazil
- Produced by: M. G. Sekar
- Starring: Mammootty; Kanaka
- Cinematography: Anandakuttan
- Edited by: T. R. Shekar
- Music by: Ilaiyaraaja
- Production company: M. G. Pictures
- Release date: 13 November 1993
- Running time: 135 minutes
- Country: India
- Language: Tamil

Kilipecchu Ketkavaa (transl. Come, listen to the parrot) is a 1993 Indian Tamil-language romantic comedy film, directed by Fazil, starring Mammootty and Kanaka. It was released on 13 November 1993.

== Plot ==
Chidambaram, a poor and newly appointed schoolteacher, demanded to stay in an allegedly haunted palace and work as a night watchman there apart from being a teacher in the day time. To support his mother, he agreed to this. He stayed in the palace alone. At first, he was scared because of the presence of the ghost. It was Sivagami, the heir of the palace, acted as a ghost to get back the palace that was illegally taken over by their rival family when her grandfather was four years old. The duo, grandfather and granddaughter, made up a story of haunted palace to avoid selling the property. Chidambaram came to an agreement living with the ghost of the house, Sivagami, who actually pretends as a ghost to him. The relationship built on and both end up in love.

To get back their palace, the grandfather with his granddaughter had to perform annual pooja at the village's Durga temple continuously for 20 years. Chidambaram reached the village on the 20th year.

The love between Chidambaram and Sivagami was not approved by her cousin Sounder (Nasser), whom wanted to marry her. The village chief, as per their village's custom, declared Chidambaram and Sounder to participate in a combat held during the annual pooja to select a groom among them.

Chidabaram won the combat. But, Sounder, who was jealous and envy of Chidambaram, planned to detonate a bomb to kill the latter with the help of local goon, Joseph. Knowing about Sounder's plan through Joseph's son, Sivagami ran towards Chidambaram to stop him, but she was killed in the blast. Sounder and Joseph were chased by the villagers on Knowing about their cruel plan. Before her last breath, Sivagami revealed the truth (acting as a ghost in the palace) to Chidambaram.

Heart-broken Chidambaram decided to leave the palace and the village all together. When he was about to leave the palace, the real ghost of late Sivagami showed her presence in the palace. On seeing this, Chidambaram was happy and returned inside the palace making his heart to live with his eternal lover.

== Cast ==
- Mammootty as Chidambaram
- Kanaka as Sivakami
- Vijayakumar as Grandfather
- Nassar as Sounder
- Charle as a Villager
- Cheenu Mohan as Tea vendor

== Soundtrack ==
The soundtrack was composed by Ilaiyaraaja, with lyrics written by Vaali. The song "Sivagami Nenapinile" is set in the Carnatic raga Mayamalavagowla, and the song "Vanthadhu" is set in the raga Shree ranjani. There are two versions of "Anbe Vaa Arugile": one sung by K. J. Yesudas, and another by S. Janaki.

Track listing
No.	Title	Singer(s)	Length
1.	"Adichu Viratuven"	Mano, Surendar	4:08
2.	"Anbe Vaa Arugile" (Female)	S. Janaki	5:08
3.	"Anbe Vaa Arugile" (Male)	K. J. Yesudas	5:08
4.	"Sivakami Ninaipilae"	S. P. Balasubrahmanyam, S. Janaki	5:02
5.	"Vanthadhu Vanthadhu"	S. Janaki, chorus	3:57
Total length:			23:23

== Release and reception ==
Kilipetchu Ketkavaa was released on 13 November 1993, Diwali day. Malini Mannath of The Indian Express wrote the day before, "The script is ingenious, is constantly engaging and makes the film a delight to watch". On 21 November, R. P. R. of Kalki told viewers to enjoy it like a magic show without expecting too much logic.
