= Thrishna =

- Poster
- Directed by: I. V. Sasi
- Written by: M. T. Vasudevan Nair
- Screenplay by: M. T. Vasudevan Nair
- Produced by: Rosamma George
- Starring: Mammootty; Rajyalakshmi; Swapna; Kaviyoor Ponnamma
- Cinematography: Jayanan Vincent
- Edited by: K. Narayanan
- Music by: Shyam
- Production company: JMJ Arts
- Distributed by: JMJ Arts
- Release date: 30 October 1981
- Country: India
- Language: Malayalam

Thrishna(transl. Desire) is a 1981 Indian Malayalam film written by M. T Vasudevan Nair, directed by I. V. Sasi and produced by Rosamma George. The film has musical score by Shyam. The film stars Mammootty, Rajyalakshmi, Swapna and Kaviyoor Ponnamma in the lead roles. The film gave Mammootty his major break as a solo hero. The film tells the story of Das (Mammootty), who is a rich playboy and his relationships with his callgirl, Jaysree (Swapna) and his love interest, Sridevi (Rajyalakshmi). Rosamma George won the 1981 Filmfare Award for Best Film - Malayalam for this film.

== Plot ==
Das is a rich and spoilt playboy who drives to his bungalow in Kodaikanal with Jaysree, a callgirl. The bungalow is looked after by caretaker Parameswaran and his Tamil wife Kannamma. Parameswaran has a son Gopan who stays away from the place and works as a tourist guide for foreigners. Parameswaran has told both of them that Jaysree is Das' wife to avoid ill-fame to the family name. Das feels he owns Jaysree and does not waste a single opportunity to ridicule her profession. Other than sex, there is no emotional bond between them.
A family friend of Das' late father, Panikkar and his family drop by to meet Das' wife which makes Das uncomfortable. Though Jaysree initially refuses to play the role, she later acts as a dutiful wife in front of them. Panikkar's family consists of his wife Chinnammu Amma, father-in-law Rao Bahadur Shankaramenon, and two daughters, elder one being Nirmala married to engineer Ramakrishnan and younger one Sridevi who is separated from her husband. Two relations build up simultaneously. On one side, Sridevi is able to bring back the fondness of music in Das and they spend time understanding each other. On the other side, Jaysree feels Gopan is like herself, a victim of helplessness and she becomes attracted to him.

Things take a turn when, after a moment of passion, Jaysree tells the truth about herself to Gopan and he feels a revulsion towards her. Meanwhile, Das confesses his womanising nature to Sridevi and then proposes to her but she is unable to commit to him. Finally, Jaysree leaves the house and Gopan joins her in her journey. Sridevi's separated husband Vijayshankar apologises to her for his insensitive behaviour and she goes back to him. In the end, Das drives off from the place, all alone.

== Cast ==
- Mammootty as Das
- Rajyalakshmi as Sreedevi
- Swapna as Jayasree
- Ratheesh as Vijayshankar
- Rajkumar as Gopakumar
- Lalu Alex as Ramakrishnan
- Kaviyoor Ponnamma as Chinammu Amma
- Beena Kumbalangi as Nirmala
- Jose Prakash as Panikkar
- Sankaradi as Parameswaran
- Mallika Sukumaran as Kannamma
- Premji as Raobahadur Shankaramenon

== Production ==
The film is Mammootty's first film in a leading role. Mammootty replaced Babu Namboothiri as lead actor just after 12 days of shooting. The film was shot extensively in and around Kodaikanal.

== Release ==
The film was released on 31 October 1981. The film was critically acclaimed and was a commercial success.

== Soundtrack ==
The music was composed by Shyam and the lyrics were written by Bichu Thirumala. The film's songs were chartbusters.

No.	Song	Singers	Lyrics	Length (m:ss)
1	"Alakal Malarithalukal"	Unni Menon, Chorus	Bichu Thirumala	
2	"Etho Sanketham"	K. J. Yesudas, Chorus	Bichu Thirumala	
3	"Mainaakam Kadalil Ninnuyarunnuvo"	K. J. Yesudas	Bichu Thirumala	
4	"Mainaakam Kadalil Ninnuyarunnuvo"	S. Janaki	Bichu Thirumala	
5	"Mainaakam Kadalil Ninnuyarunnuvo" (F) - Version 2	S. Janaki	Bichu Thirumala	
6	"Shruthiyil Ninnuyarum" (F)	S. Janaki	Bichu Thirumala	
7	"Shruthiyil Ninnuyarum" (F) - Violin Version	S. Janaki	Bichu Thirumala	
8	"Shruthiyil Ninnuyarum" (M)	K. J. Yesudas	Bichu Thirumala	
9	"Shruthiyil Ninnuyarum" (M) - Version II	K. J. Yesudas	Bichu Thirumala	
10	"Theyyaattam Dhamanikalil"	K. J. Yesudas, S. Janaki	Bichu Thirumala	

== Awards ==
- Filmfare Award for Best Film - Malayalam won by Rosamma George (1981)
