= Akkare =

- Directed by: K. N. Sasidharan
- Written by: PK Nandana Varma
- Screenplay by: K. N. Sasidharan
- Produced by: K. N. Sasidharan
- Starring: Bharat Gopy; Madhavi
- Cinematography: Divakara Menon
- Edited by: Venugopal
- Music by: M. B. Sreenivasan
- Production company: Soorya Rekha
- Distributed by: Soorya Rekha
- Release date: 14 January 1984
- Country: India
- Language: Malayalam

Akkare (transl. The Other Bank) is a 1984 Indian Malayalam-language film directed, written, and produced by K. N. Sasidharan (in his directorial debut). The film stars Bharath Gopi and Madhavi in lead roles, with Mammootty, Mohanlal, and Nedumudi Venu in guest roles.

== Plot ==
Gopi lives a moderate life. He is a well-respected tahasildar and has no great difficulties in caring for his wife and children. Although life is not tumultuous and difficult, his wife remains unhappy and greedy, longing for a luxurious lifestyle. She believes the only way to achieve it is for Gopi to move his family to the Persian Gulf region. One day, a stranger from the Gulf, named Johnny, arrives at the place. His ways of making a living in the Gulf are not dealt with in detail, but it is assumed that he does not live a luxurious life there.

Because of his wife's compulsion, Gopi decides to meet Johnny to come up with a plan to move to the Gulf. There, with Johnny's advice, he starts learning how to type. Later, another person named Ismail also arrives from the Gulf. From Ismail, Gopi understands that typing does not provide good job opportunities as most of the companies are recruiting Arabs instead of foreigners. Ismail's father, being a tailor, naturally tells him tailors have better opportunities than typists.

Gopi's wife Padmavathi, meanwhile, compels him to learn sewing so that Ismail may help him get a visa. The tailor also seems to run a lewd business. One night, when the father is not at home, Gopi happens to come to the house and sways to the sexual advances of the daughter. He is caught by the local people, mistaking him for a thief while he is running from the house to catch a thief whom he sees passing by. Inside the police station, he is identified as the tahasildar, and the police let him go after taking him to the hospital. Now, Gopi has lost his prestige and good name in the society.

Later, his wife's brother, Sudhan, who also arrives from the Persian Gulf tells him about the real conditions abroad. According to him, a person who is willing to do almost all kinds of jobs, like that of a coolie, can get employment and survive in the Gulf. Gopi is disappointed to hear this news. The next day, he gets a letter informing him that he is suspended from his job because of the case against him. He imagines himself becoming a coolie carrying Johnny's luggage who, this time is returning from the Gulf. In the climax scene, Gopi is portrayed as a toy which drums when wound up, just like he had been doing whatever his wife says. This time, his wife is saying that Sudhan will arrange a visa next year, and he should do a manual job, if needed.

== Cast ==
- Bharath Gopi as Gopi
- Madhavi as Padmavathi ( Voice dubbed by Kottayam Shantha )
- Mammootty as Ismail
- Mohanlal as Sudhan
- Nedumudi Venu as Johnny
- Sreenivasan
- Master Prasad Babu as Gopi's Son
- Baby Vandana as Gopi's Daughter
- Ranipadmini as Valsala
- V. K. Sreeraman
