= Eettillam =

- Poster
- Directed by: Fazil
- Written by: Fazil
- Produced by: S. Abdul salam M.H. Mohammed Ilyas; Kaladharan Nair
- Starring: Nedumudi Venu; Bharath Gopi; Mammootty; Menaka; Jalaja; Kalaranjini
- Cinematography: Ramachandra Babu
- Edited by: T. R. Shekhar
- Music by: A. T. Ummer
- Production company: Friends Arts Pictures
- Release date: 23 March 1983 (Kerala)
- Running time: 145 min
- Country: India
- Language: Malayalam

Eettillam is 1983 Malayalam film written and directed by Fazil, starring Nedumudi Venu, Mammootty, Bharath Gopi, Menaka, Jalaja and Kalaranjini in the lead roles. The film stars Nedumudi Venu, Menaka, Mammootty and Bharath Gopi in lead roles. The film had musical score by A. T. Ummer.

== Plot ==
Abida lives a poor life with her grandfather Moitheen. She meets a man and starts to believe that her life would change but she isn't aware of the secrets that man is hiding from her.

== Cast ==
- Nedumudi Venu as Vijayan
- Bharath Gopi as Moitheen Bava
- Mammootty as Sivan
- Menaka as Abida
- Jalaja as Kusumam
- Kalaranjini as Kausalya
- Bahadoor as Vasu
- Alummoodan as Kochappi
- Azeez as Vijayan's father
