= Kerala awards =

Kerala's civilian awards

- Awarded for: Contribution towards society
- Sponsored by: Government of Kerala
- Country: India
- First award: November 1, 2022

Kerala awards are state-level civilian awards instituted by the Government of Kerala, India on the model of the Padma awards instituted by the Government of India.

Established in 2021, the awards are conferred on individuals who have made "priceless contribution to the society". The awardees are announced every year on 1 November, which is observed as the Kerala Piravi.

== Categories ==
The Kerala awards are of three categories.

- Kerala Jyothi: This is the highest award and will be conferred only on one person.
- Kerala Prabha: This is the second highest award and is conferred on three individuals.
- Kerala Sree: This is the third highest award and is conferred on six persons.

The awardees are to be selected by a special award committee after scrutiny by two subordinate committees and would be distributed in a ceremony that would be held in the Lok Bhavan, the official residence of the Governor.

== Awardees ==
The winners of the maiden Kerala awards were announced on 1 November 2022.

=== Kerala Jyothi awardees ===
Year	Image	Recipient	Occupation	Ref.
2022		M. T. Vasudevan Nair	Writer	
2023		T. Padmanabhan	Writer	
2024		M. K. Sanu	Writer	
2025		M. R. Raghava Varier	Epigraphist	

=== Kerala Prabha awardees ===
Year	Image	Recipient(s)	Occupation	Ref.
2022		Mammootty (arts)	Actor	
2022		Omchery N. N. Pillai (arts, drama, social service, public service)	Playwright	
2022		T Madhava Menon (civil service, social service)	Former Civil Servant and Social Worker	
2023		Fathima Beevi	Justice of the Supreme Court	
2023		Soorya Krishnamoorthy	Artist, Philanthropist and Scientist	
2024		S. Somanath (science, engineering)	Former chairman of ISRO	
2024		P. Bhuvaneswari	Agriculture	
2025		Rajashree Warrier (arts)	Dancer, Musician and Writer	
2025		P. B. Aneesh	Agriculture	

=== Kerala Sree awardees ===
Year	Image	Recipient(s)	Occupation	Ref.
2022		Gopinath Muthukad (social service, arts)	Magician	
2022		Kanayi Kunhiraman (arts)	Sculptor	
2022		Kochouseph Chittilappilly (social service, industry)	Industrialist	
2022		M. P. Parameswaran (science, social service)	Scientist	
2022		Sathyabhama Das Biju (science)	Amphibian Biologist	
2022		Vaikom Vijayalakshmi (arts)	Singer	
2023		Punalur Somarajan	Social Service	
2023		V. P. Gangadharan (health)	Oncologist	
2023		Ravi D. C. (industry and commerce)	Industrialist	
2023		K. M. Chandrasekhar	Civil Service	
2023		Ramesh Narayan (art, music)	Classical Vocalist	
2024		Vimala Menon (art)	Mohiniyattam	
2024		Dr. T. K. Jayakumar	Health	
2024		Narayana Bhattathiri	Calligraphy	
2024		Sanju Samson (sports)	Cricketer	
2024		Shyja Baby	Social Service	
2024		V. K. Mathews	Industry, Commerce	
2025		Shashi Kumar	Media	
2025		Shahal Hassan Musaliar	Education	
2025		M.K. Vimal Govind	Start-ups	
2025		Jilumol Mariyat Thomas	Various fields	
2025		Abhilash Tomy	Sports	

== See also ==
- Orders, decorations, and medals of India
