= Kalachakram =

- Poster
- Directed by: K. Narayanan
- Written by: Sreekumaran Thampi
- Produced by: A. Raghunath
- Starring: Prem Nazir; Jayabharathi; Adoor Bhasi
- Cinematography: T. N. Krishnankutty Nair
- Edited by: K. Narayanan; M. Vellaswamy
- Music by: G. Devarajan
- Production company: Sanjay Productions
- Distributed by: Ambika Release
- Release date: 16 March 1973
- Running time: 127 minutes
- Country: India
- Language: Malayalam

Kalachakram is a 1973 Indian Malayalam-language film, directed by K. Narayanan and written by Sreekumaran Thampi. The film stars Prem Nazir, Jayabharathi, Bahadoor and Adoor Bhasi. It was released on 16 March 1973.

== Cast ==
- Prem Nazir as Ravi
- Jayabharathi as Radha
- Sasi
- Adoor Bhasi as Kochukuttan
- T. S. Muthaiah
- Bahadoor as Prabhu
- Radhamani
- Rani Chandra
- Kavitha (Cabaret Dancer)
- Sudheer
- Vincent
- Mammootty(bit part, uncredited)

== Production ==
.

== Soundtrack ==
The music was composed by G. Devarajan and the lyrics were written by Sreekumaran Thampi.

| Song | Singers |
|---|---|
| "Chithrashaala Njaan" | P. Madhuri |
| "Kaalamorajnaatha Kaamukan" | K. J. Yesudas |
| "Madam Pottichirikkunna" (Bit) [From Chithramela] | P. Madhuri |
| "Makarasankramasandhyayil" | P. Madhuri |
| "Ormakalthan Thamara" | K. J. Yesudas, P. Susheela |
| "Raajyam Poyoru Raajakumaran" | K. J. Yesudas |
| "Raakkuyilin Raajasadassil" | K. J. Yesudas |
| "Roopavathi Nin" | P. Jayachandran, P. Madhuri |
