= Mrugaya (1989 film) =

1989 Indian film

- Theatrical release poster
- Directed by: I. V. Sasi
- Written by: A. K. Lohithadas
- Produced by: KRG
- Starring: Mammootty; Thilakan; Sunitha; Jagathy Sreekumar; Urvashi
- Cinematography: V. Jayaram
- Edited by: K. Narayanan
- Music by: Shankar–Ganesh
- Production company: KRG Enterprises
- Distributed by: KRG Release
- Release date: 23 December 1989
- Country: India
- Language: Malayalam

Mrugaya (English: The Hunt) is a 1989 Indian Malayalam-language action thriller film written by A. K. Lohithadas and directed by I. V. Sasi. The film stars Mammootty and Sunitha in the lead role, with Thilakan, Jagathy Sreekumar, Lalu Alex, and Urvashi in supporting roles. It tells the story of Varunni (Mammootty), the uncultured and drunkard hunter, who arrives in the village to kill a man-eating leopard. The film won two Kerala State Film Awards. The leopard, used in a number of scenes in the film, was lent by animal trainer Govindarajan Naidu. Sasi had said that the climax fight scene with the leopard was done by Mammootty himself without dupes.

The film was a commercial success and the character of Varunni attained cult status. Mammootty's different look and natural acting helped in the movie's success.

== Plot ==
The story takes place in a Highrange village, terrorised by the frequent attacks of a man-eating leopard. Tired of waiting for help from the authorities, the villagers under Reverend Father Panangodan and Philipose Muthalali decide to hire a hunter. The hunter whom they wanted had recently died. Hence, his son, Varunni, is summoned to the village. The uncultured life of Varunni soon became a headache for the village. The villagers try to avoid Varunni who is a drunkard.

However, a woman named Bhagyalakshmi (whose mother was killed by the leopard) befriends Varunni. This relation makes Thomaskutty, who is in love with Bhagyalakshmi, jealous. Seeing Varunni talking to Bhagyalakshmi, Thomaskutty gets angry and starts fighting with Varunni. In the fight, Thomaskutty accidentally slips and falls from the top of the cliff. Varunni feels responsible for the death of Thomaskutty and confesses secretly to Father Panangodan. Father Panangodan realises the big heart inside Varunni. He decides to protect Varunni despite the objections from the villagers and arranges a livelihood for him. Varunni gradually starts to help the villagers and the family of Thomaskutty. The villagers also develop a soft corner for Varunni. Meanwhile, the leopard again comes to the village, and Varunni fails to kill it after Philipose's son-in-law Antony and his friend Kunjachan cheats them and tries to kill him. The leopard escapes with a wound. Soon, Kunjachan dies after suffering from rabies.

The preparations for the betrothal of Thomaskutty's sister, Annamma, go on but the groom fails to show up at the function. At the directions of Father Panangodan, Varunni decides to marry Annamma. This makes Bhagyalakshmi, who was in love with Varunni, jealous. On the eve of the wedding, she informs Annamma that Varunni had killed Thomaskutty. Varunni gets exposed on the wedding day and flees to his hut. On reaching the hut, Varunni finds his dog barking alarmingly. He concludes that the dog has rabies and kills it. Soon he spots the leopard at the top of his hut and realizes that his dog was actually warning him about the leopard. Though injured, Varunni manages to kill the leopard with an axe. The villagers celebrate the death of the leopard. However, the police soon arrive and arrest Varunni for murdering Thomaskutty. He confesses to Annamma that he accidentally killed Thomaskutty.

== Cast ==
- Mammootty as Varunni
- Thilakan as Father Panangodan
- Sunitha as Bhagyalakshmi
- Urvashi as Annamma
- Jagathy Sreekumar as Advocate Ramankutty
- Lalu Alex as Anthony
- Sankaradi as Shankunni
- Kuthiravattom Pappu as Kunju Abdullah
- Jagannatha Varma as Philipose Muthalali
- Bheeman Raghu as Kunjachan
- Paravoor Bharathan as Pillai
- Mahesh as Thomaskutty
- Kunjandi as Kuriachan
- Shari as Selina
- Vaishnavi as Radhamani
- Kousalya as Zeenath
- Priya as Yashoda

== Release ==
The film was released on 23 December 1989.

=== Box office ===
The film was both commercially blockbuster and critically acclaimed.

== Music ==
The lyrics for this movie were written by Sreekumaran Thampi and the music was composed by Shankar–Ganesh.

=== Tracks ===
- Orikkal Niranjum sung by KJ Yesudas
- Oru Nadam sung by K J Yesudas K.S.Chithra

== Accolades ==
- Kerala State Film Award for Best Director – IV Sasi
- Kerala State Film Award for Best Actor – Mammootty
