= Varsham (2014 film) =

2014 film by Ranjith Sankar

- Film poster
- Directed by: Ranjith Sankar
- Written by: Ranjith Sankar
- Produced by: Mammootty; Ranjith Sankar
- Starring: Mammootty; Asha Sarath; T. G. Ravi; Mamta Mohandas; Govind Padmasoorya; Shebin Benson
- Cinematography: Manoj Pillai
- Edited by: Sagar Dass
- Music by: Bijibal
- Distributed by: Play House Release; Dreams and Beyonds; Tricolor Entertainment
- Release date: 6 November 2014
- Running time: 138 minutes
- Country: India
- Language: Malayalam

Varsham (Rains) is a 2014 Malayalam family drama film written and directed by Ranjith Sankar. The film stars Mammootty and Asha Sarath in the main roles, T. G. Ravi as the antagonist, along with Mamta Mohandas, Govind Padmasoorya and Master Prajwal in major supporting roles. It features a film score and soundtrack by Bijibal. Varsham released worldwide on 6 November 2014. The film received generally positive reviews from critics.

== Plot ==
The film narrates the story of Venu who is an affluent finance company owner but at the same time very much uses the usual croony tactics finance companies use to build their business. His world is limited to only his son and wife. Like any father he imposes his dreams and aspirations on his son without realizing the effect it is having on him. One night, after an argument with Anand on giving a worker 10000 rupees for building house, his son dies of a cardiac arrest and this leads him to see the world in a different perspective. Using his finance company, Venu starts using innovative loan schemes at interests rates lower than that of the market to help people with healthcare, education and other such needs, which leads to him making enemies of his rivals. How he copes up with all these issues and tries to keep his social work in the name of his son alive forms the crux of the story.

== Cast ==
- Mammootty as P.K. Venugopal (Venu)
- Asha Sarath as Nandini
- T. G. Ravi as Manavaalan Peter
- Govind Padmasoorya as Prakashan
- Mamta Mohandas as Doctor Jayasree
- Prajwal Prasad as Anand
- Irshad as Mohanan
- Sudheer Karamana as Father Stephen Mathew
- Shebin Benson as Ameer
  - Nebish Benson as Young Ameer
- Anoop Vickraman as Kannan
- Sunil Sukhada as Shambu
- Sarayu as Deepa, Nandini's younger sister
- Sajitha Madathil as Omana
- Jayashree Sivadhas as Omana’s Daughter
- Shivaji Guruvayoor as Devadas
- Sreelatha Namboothiri as Thangammayi
- Hareesh Peradi as Jayaraj, Venu's Younger brother
- Santhosh Keezhattoor as Satheesan
- Vinod Kovoor as Aslam
- Anjana Appukuttan as Hima
- T S Raju as Colonel Hakkim

== Soundtrack ==
Varsham

Soundtrack album by Bijibal
- Released: 11 October 2014
- Genre: Feature film soundtrack
- Length: 7:37
- Label: Mathrubhumi Music
- Producer: Bijibal

Bijibal chronology
Tamaar Padaar (2014)	Varsham (2014)	Lal Bahadur Shastri (2014)

Bijibal, who had earlier collaborated with Ranjith Sankar for all his films except Molly Aunty Rocks!, composed the soundtrack for the film. The lyrics were written by Santhosh Varma and M.R Jayageetha. The soundtrack of the film was released on 11 October 2014 under the label Mathrubhumi Music.

Track listing
No.	Title	Lyrics	Singer(s)	Length
1.	"Koottuthedi"	M.R Jayageetha	Sachin Warrier	04:04
2.	"Karimukilukal"	Santhosh Varma	Sharreth	03:33
Total length:				07:37

== Release ==
Varsham released worldwide on 6 November 2014 in about 400 theaters. The film released simultaneously in India as well as in countries such as the United States, the United Kingdom, Singapore, Uganda, Tanzania, Zambia, Australia, Canada, Japan and the United Arab Emirates, a first for a Malayalam film.

=== Marketing ===
The trailer and audio of the film was launched in a function at Oberon Mall in Kochi on 11 October 2014. The function was live streamed in Mammootty's official website. It was announced on the event that no flex boards or plastic would be used to market Varsham. A song of the film "Koottuthedi" was released through the mobile messaging app WhatsApp for the first time in a Malayalam film.

== Reception ==
Varsham received generally positive reviews from critics, with praise towards the performances, direction and the screenplay.

=== Box office ===
The film was both commercial and critical success. The film collected £212 from 1st weekend at UK box office.

=== Critical reception ===
Nicy V.P of International Business Times gave the film 5/5 stars and wrote, "Varsham is a movie worth investing your time and money. The USP of the movie is definitely the performance by the actors and the casting of the movie requires a special mention. Mammootty has carried the whole film on his shoulders with his impeccable perfection in acting." IndiaGlitz concluded its review, "Varsham is a very heart-touching tale with a very important message" and gave the film a rating of 8.5 out of 10. Sreejith Naripatta of Indiavision gave the film 4 stars in a scale of 5 and wrote, "Even though the narrative is told in a simple way, the audience is never allowed to be free from the mental tension" and that it "could be added to the list of the best family movies of Mammootty." Akhila Menon of FilmiBeat also rated the film 4/5 and stated that Ranjith Sankar "manages to bring up a very simple theme and portray it without any entertaining gimmicks or over-dosage of sentiments." She concluded that the film was a "tender and completely engrossing family drama."

Padmakumar K of Malayala Manorama rated it 3.5 out of 5 and wrote, "Many scenes are tearjerkers, but they lend an aura of substance as no other film in the immediate past has been able to. Sensibly orchestrated, these portrayals are captivating, deeply moving, rich and original." He concluded that the film "stands out as an exceptional work by Ranjith Sankar." The Times of India gave the film 3.5 in a scale of 5 and concluded its review, "Varsham has the elements of a thought-provoking film, which lingers even after you exit the movie hall." The performances were praised as the reviewer noted, "Asha Sarath's powerful portrayal deserves a special mention", while also stating Mammootty's performance as "soulful". Jahangir Razzak of Mathrubhumi wrote that the film, "is the most beautiful film of Ranjith Sankar" and concluded, "Varsham is a torrential downpour of goodness and the simplicity of appearance."

Veeyen of Now Running rated it 3/5 and stated, "Varsham is a soothing shower of compassion and goodwill that is undoubtedly Ranjith Sankar's best work as yet. It is a magnificently touching, tragic film that soaks you up in melancholy and optimism." He lauded the performance of Mammootty and wrote, "Mammootty lends his heart and soul to Venu, and comes up with a well rounded and emotionally raw performance that will, without doubt leave your eyes moist on several occasions". The reviewer of Sify rated the film as "Good" and stated that the film was "a rehashed version of those stereotyped movies from the past, but even then it has been presented well." It also added, "Mammootty makes the anguish of a father look disturbingly real" and that "for the fans of Mammootty, this one is nothing less than a grand treat." Paresh C Palicha, writing for Rediff, commented, "Varsham carries the stamp of Ranjith Sankar which is enhanced by Mammootty's presence." He gave the film 3 out of 5 stars. Behindwoods also awarded the film 3/5 stars and stated, "With stellar performances from the lead actors, the movie feels disturbingly real and leaves the audience in tears on several occasions."

On the contrary, Raj Vikram of Metro Matinee wrote that the film "holds no surprises and fails to fully tap the hidden potential in the subject" and concluded, "Varsham is akin to an impending rain, that never pours!" E.V. Shibu of Mangalam lauded the performance of Mammootty as he noted, "Mammootty amazes the audience just with his lip movement and makes them shed some tears" and wrote that the film "is full of moments that take advantage of the acting prowess of Mammootty", but criticized the film as a whole, "The visuals and characters that wander aimlessly in the second half, the slow pace and situations without any tightness make the 139-minute-long film a morose experience." Sharika C. of The Hindu wrote, "You know exactly where the film is going, and the only things that are added to the film at every turn, or lack of it, are more tears" and stated that the film "offers nothing new."

=== Accolades ===
Varsham was ranked amongst the year-end top ten lists of International Business Times and Sify. Mammootty received the award for the best actor at the 17th Asianet Film Awards, 62nd Filmfare Awards South and 2014 Vanitha Film Awards for his portrayal of Venu. He was also nominated for the same at the 4th South Indian International Movie Awards, while Asha Sarath won the Best Actress award at the 2014 Ramu Kariat Movie Awards and was nominated for the same at the Filmfare Awards.
