= Adiyozhukkukal =

- Theatrical release poster
- Directed by: I.V. Sasi
- Written by: M. T. Vasudevan Nair
- Produced by: Raju Mathew
- Starring: Mammootty; Mohanlal; Seema; Rahman; Vincent
- Cinematography: Jayanan Vincent
- Edited by: K. Narayanan
- Music by: Shyam
- Distributed by: Century Films
- Release date: 20 December 1984
- Running time: 132 minutes
- Country: India
- Language: Malayalam

Adiyozhukkukal (transl. Undercurrents) is a 1984 Indian Malayalam-language drama film directed by I. V. Sasi and written by M. T. Vasudevan Nair, starring Mammootty, Mohanlal, Seema, Balan K. Nair, Vincent, and Rahman. The film was produced by Raju Mathew under the banner of Casino and was distributed by Century Films.

Mammootty received his first Kerala State Film Award for Best Actor for his performance as Karunan, and Jayanan Vincent won the award for Best Cinematography. The film was a critical and commercial success. Later, it was remade Tamil as Vanna Kanavugal with Karthik, Murali, and Jayashree. Critics consider Mammootty's portrayal of Karunan in the film as one of the finest in his early career.

== Plot ==
Karunan is an arrogant fisherman back from jail after five years. Upon arriving at his coastal village, he finds much has changed. Chandran, his trusted lieutenant, who is more like a younger brother is now a worker at the nearby toddy shop. Chandran again joins him and helps Karunan in setting up his life. Karunan is shocked to see that Madhavi, whom he loved once, is now married to Kumaran, for whom he had to go to jail. Kumaran ditched Karunan and within a short time, he himself emerged as a rich man in the locality. Karunan decides to avenge Kumaran, but is attacked severely at night by his goons. He is saved by Gopi, a jobless young man, who accidentally witnesses the incident. Gopi becomes a good friend of Karunan and starts staying with him and Chandran. In the meantime, Devayani a young woman, also joins them due to unexpected situations. The unpleasant incidents in each of their lives and Karunan's fight against Kumaran form the rest of the story.

== Cast ==
- Mammootty as Karunan, an arrogant fisherman
- Mohanlal as Gopi, the man who saves Karunan
- Seema as Devyani, who joins Karunan
- Rahman as Chandran, Karunan's friend
- Vincent as Kumaran Mooppan
- Menaka as Madhavi
- Sukumari as Radha
- Manianpilla Raju as Jayarajan
- Sankaradi as Josephettan
- Manavalan Joseph
- Bahadoor as Kunjikka
- Sathaar as Narayanan, the villain
- Paravoor Bharathan
- Kuthiravattam Pappu as Sivankutty
- Kundara Johny as Govindan
- Janardhanan as Hamsa
- Kaviyoor Ponnamma as Mariyamachedathi
- Sunitha Sharma as Karthiyaani

== Crew ==
- Cinematography: Jayanan Vincent
- Editing: K. Narayanan
- Makeup: M. O. Devassya
- Costumes: M. M. Kumar
- Stunts: Thyagaragan
- Advertisement: P. N. Menon
- Processing: Vijaya Colour Lab
- Stills: Ansari
- Associate Director: Jomon
- Assistant Director: Anil Kumar
- Co-producers: Mammootty, Mohanlal, I. V. Sasi, Seema

== Awards ==
- Mammootty won the 1984 Kerala State Film Award for Best Actor and Filmfare Award.
- Jayanan Vincent won the 1984 Kerala State Film Award for Best Photography.

== Box office ==
The film was a commercial success.
