= Devalokam (film) =

- A still from incomplete movie Devalokam
- Directed by: M. T. Vasudevan Nair
- Screenplay by: M. T. Vasudevan Nair
- Based on: Novel written by Cherukad of the same name
- Produced by: Janasakthi Films
- Starring: Sabu; Jayamala; Mammootty
- Cinematography: Still Photographer: Sreedharan Master
- Country: India
- Language: Malayalam

Devalokam (transl. Abode of gods) is an unfinished Indian Malayalam-language drama film directed by M. T. Vasudevan Nair in 1979. It had Sabu and Jayamala in the lead roles. Mammootty appeared in his debut credited role. The film was produced by Janasakthi Films.

== Cast ==
- Sabu
- Jayamala
- Mammootty as Pappachan

== Production ==
The shooting of the film was done at Palakkad. At that time, Mammootty was working as a lawyer at Manjeri court. The shooting was lagged due to financial problems and production eventually ceased due to conflicts among cast and crew due to the lack of funds.

== Bibliography ==
- Menon, P. N. Nirakoottukal.
