= Kaiyoppu =

- Theatrical poster
- Directed by: Ranjith
- Screenplay by: Ambikasuthan Mangad
- Story by: Ranjith
- Produced by: Ranjith
- Starring: Mammootty; Khushbu; Mukesh
- Cinematography: Manoj Pillai
- Edited by: Beena Paul
- Music by: Vidyasagar
- Production company: Capital Theatre
- Distributed by: Lal Release
- Release date: 26 January 2007 (Kerala)
- Running time: 95 minutes
- Country: India
- Language: Malayalam

Kaiyoppu (transl. Signature) is a 2007 Indian Malayalam-language film produced, written and directed by Ranjith and stars Mammootty, Khushbu, and Mukesh.

== Plot ==
Balachandran, an accountant with a fertilizer company, is also someone with a deep passion for books and literature. He is a bachelor, keeping himself shut from the rest of the world. Residing in a small one-room at a lodge in Kochi, Balachandran had also started writing a novel, but could not go forward due to a writing block. Shivadasan, a publisher, happens to read the initial parts of the novel and is very enthusiastic about publishing this work. He persuades Balachandran to complete the work as fast as he can to publish it. Shivadasan is confident about the success of this novel.

Balachandran asks Shivadasan to hand over a certain amount of money to a girl named Fathima, who is suffering from a heart ailment. Though not have ever seen her, Balachandran is financially supporting Fatima for some time, and she respects and admires him. One day, Balachandran gets a call from his ex-girlfriend, Padma, after a long time. She was his girlfriend during college days and they couldn't get married due to social and financial differences between the families. She was married to a businessman in Mumbai and is now separated from him. The arrival of Padma brings a new light into his life. They talk for long time on phone and share their feelings. He is then carried back to his old college life. Balachandran, in the meantime, completes his novel. Shivadasan is all set to publish this work.

Balachandran plans to arrive in Kozhikode, his home town for Fathima's heart surgery. Also, he has plans to meet Padma. He, in sudden need of finance to meet the surgery expenses, sells off his land. But that night, Feroz Babu, the owner of his lodge is arrested by police for terror charges. Though, they found no evidence at the lodge and had no proof against him, he is taken to the police station as he is a Muslim. Balachandran reaches the station to enquire about Feroz Babu and is ill-treated by the inspector. He is poked fun at for helping a Muslim girl and the police blame him for being soft toward terrorists. Balachandran loses control over this and replies emotionally. The senior officer, who arrives at the spot suddenly, decides to release Feroz Babu along with Balachandran. He boards a bus to Kozhikode that night with the cash and his novel in the bag. But the next morning a bomb explodes in the bus and Balachandran is one among those who were killed.

== Cast ==
- Mammootty as Balachandran
- Khushbu as Padma
- Mukesh as Shivadasan
- Neena Kurup as Lalitha
- Mamukkoya as Alikkoya
- Anoop Menon as Dr. Jayashankar
- Nedumudi Venu as C.P Vasudevan (Writer)
- Kozhikode Narayanan Nair as Kammaran
- Biju Pappan as S.I. Nadar, a police officer who harasses Balachandran
- Jaffar Idukki as Babu

== Soundtrack ==
Kaiyoppu

Soundtrack album by Vidyasagar
- Released: 11 January 2007
- Recorded: Varsha Vallaki Studios
- Genre: Feature Film Soundtrack
- Language: Malayalam
- Producer: Vidyasagar

Vidyasagar chronology
Poi (2006)	Kaiyoppu (2007)	Mozhi (2007)

The film's music score was composed by Vidyasagar

- "Vidhiyude Kaiyoppu"
- "Jalthe Hai Jiske Liye"
- "Venthinkal"
