= Filmfare Award for Best Actor – Malayalam =

Malayalam-language cinema award

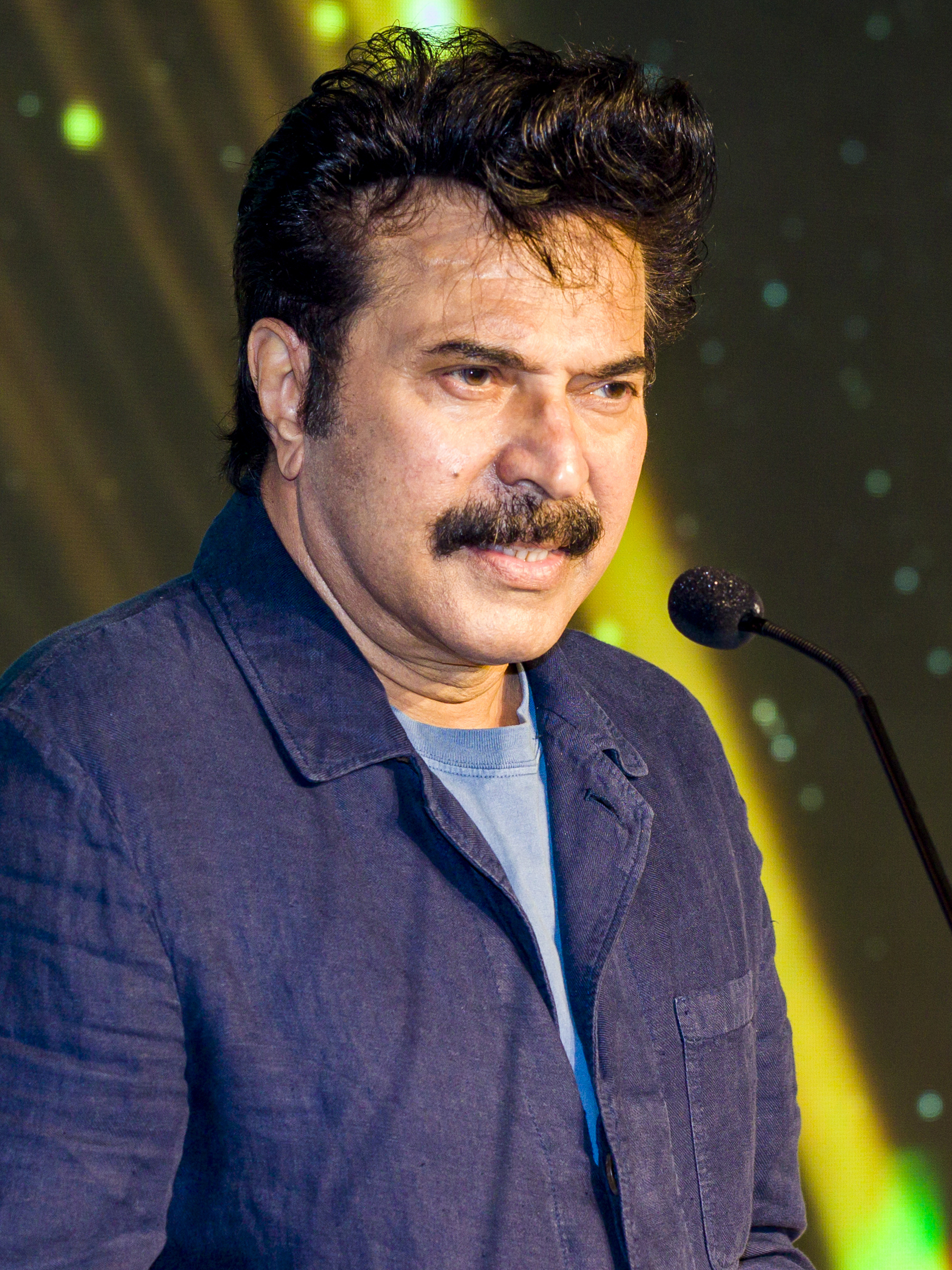
- The 2024 recipient: Mammootty
- Awarded for: Best Performance by an Actor in a Leading Role in Malayalam Films
- Country: India
- Presented by: Filmfare
- First award: Madhu for Swayamvaram (1972)
- Currently held by: Mammootty for Bramayugam (2024)

Highlights
- Most awards: Mammootty (14)

The Filmfare Award for Best Actor – Malayalam is presented annually by Filmfare magazine as part of its Filmfare Awards South ceremony, honoring excellence in Malayalam cinema. The award was instituted in 1972 and is determined by a jury.

The inaugural recipient of the award was Madhu, for his performance in Swayamvaram (1972). As of 2026, Mammootty holds the record for the most wins in this category, with 14 awards. He is also the most recent recipient, having won the award in 2024.

== Superlatives ==
Superlative	Actor	Record
Actor with most awards	Mammootty	14
Actor with most nominations	Mammootty	25
Actor with most consecutive wins	Mohanlal	3 (1993–1995)
Oldest winner	Premji	81
Oldest nominee	Premji	81
Youngest winner	Kamal Haasan	20
Youngest nominee	Kamal Haasan	20

- Mammootty holds the record for the most wins in the category, with 14 awards. He is the only actor to have won the award in five separate decades: the 1980s, 1990s, 2000s, 2010s, and 2020s. He also holds the record for receiving nominations across all five decades.
- Premji and Mammootty are the only actors to have received the award for portraying real-life individuals. Premji remains the only actor to win the award for a debut performance.
- Mohanlal holds the record for the most consecutive wins, having received the award three years in a row from 1993 to 1995. Other actors who have won in consecutive years include Madhu (1976–1977), Pratap Pothen (1979–1980), Bharat Gopy (1982–1983), Mammootty (1984–1985, 1990–1991, 1998–1999, 2009–2010, 2014–2015 and 2023-2024), and Fahadh Faasil (2012–2013).
- Mammootty and Fahadh Faasil were received the award three times within six years.
- Kamal Haasan remains the youngest recipient of the award, having won at the age of 20, for his performance in Kanyakumari (1974).
- In decade-wise distribution, Kamal Haasan and Madhu each received two awards in the 1970s. In the 1980s, Bharat Gopi, Mammootty, and Mohanlal received two awards each. Mammootty and Mohanlal each won three awards in the 1990s. Mammootty and Fahadh Faasil led with three wins each in the 2000s and 2010s, respectively.

== Winners ==
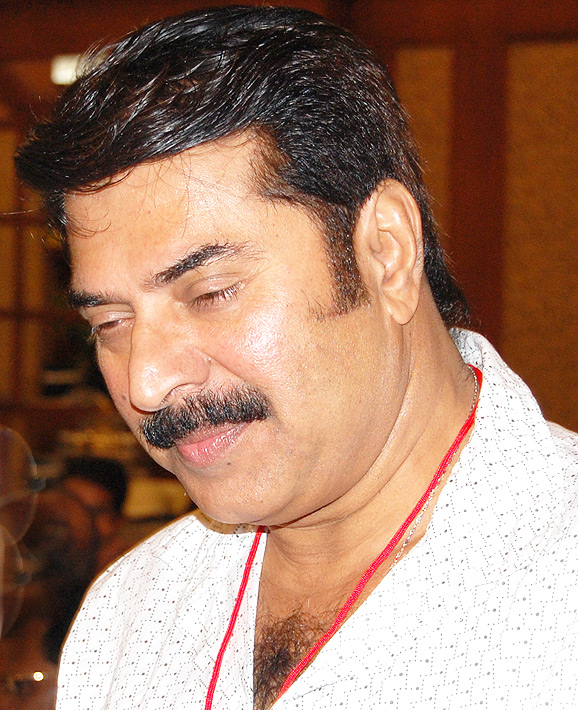
Mammootty has won the award fourteen times.

Year	Recipient	Role	Film(s)	Ref.
1972	Madhu	Vishwam	Swayamvaram	
1973	P. J. Antony	Velichapad	Nirmalayam	
1974	Kamal Haasan	Sankaran	Kanyakumari	
1975	Adoor Bhasi	Vishwanatha Menon	Raagam	
1976	Madhu	Vinod	Theekkanal	
1977	Madhu		Yuddha Kaandam	
1978	Kamal Haasan	Ramu	Yaetta	
1979	Prathap Pothan	Thakara	Thakara	
1980	Prathap Pothan	Vinod	Chamaram	
1981	Nedumudi Venu	Xavier	Vida Parayum Munpe	
1982	Bharath Gopi	Nandagopal	Ormakkayi	
1983	Bharath Gopi	Prof. Shakespeare Krishna Pillai	Kattathe Kilikkoodu	
1984	Mammootty	Karunan	Adiyozhukkukal	
1985	Mammootty	Unnikrishnan	Yathra	
1986	Mohanlal	Gopalakrishna Panikkar	Sanmanassullavarkku Samadhanam	
1987	Nedumudi Venu	Ravunni Nair	Oru Minnaminunginte Nurunguvettam	
1988	Mohanlal	Soap Kuttappan Maathu Pandaaram	Padamudra	
1989	Premji	Raghava Chakyar	Piravi	
1990	Mammootty	Vaikom Muhammad Basheer	Mathilukal	
1991	Mammootty	Achootty	Amaram	
1992	Murali	Bapputty	Aadharam	
1993	Mohanlal	Mangalassery Neelakantan	Devaasuram	
1994	Mohanlal	Unnikrishnan	Pavithram	
1995	Mohanlal	Thomas "Aadu Thoma" Chacko	Sphadikam	
1996	Jayaram	Mohanachandran Podhuval	Thooval Kottaram	
1997	Mammootty	Vidyadharan	Bhoothakkannadi	
1998	Balachandra Menon	Ismail	Samaantharangal	
1999	Mohanlal	Kunjukuttan	Vanaprastham	
2000	Mammootty	Raveendranath Menon	Arayannagalude Veedu	
2001	Jayaram	Karunakaran	Theerthadanam	
2002	Dileep	Meesa Madhavan	Meesa Madhavan	
2003	Jayaram	Reji	Manassinakkare	
2004	Mammootty	Madhavan	Kaazhcha	
2005	Mohanlal	Ramesan Nair	Thanmathra	
2006	Mammootty	Murugan	Karutha Pakshikal	
2007	Mohanlal	Valiyakathu Moosa	Paradesi	
2008	Lal	S. Raveendran Pillai	Thalappavu	
2009	Mammootty	• Murikkum Kunnathu Ahmed Haji • Haridas Ahmed • Khalid Ahmed	Paleri Manikyam	
2010	Mammootty	Chirammal Enashu Francis	Pranchiyettan & the Saint	
2011	Salim Kumar	Abu	Adaminte Makan Abu	
2012	Fahadh Faasil	Cyril C. Mathew	22 Female Kottayam	
2013	Fahadh Faasil	Harikrishnan	North 24 Kaatham	
2014	Mammootty	P. K. Venugopal	Varsham	
2015	Mammootty	Pallikkal Narayanan	Pathemari	
2016	Nivin Pauly	Biju Poulose	Action Hero Biju	
2017	Fahadh Faasil	Prasad	Thondimuthalum Driksakshiyum	
2018	Joju George	Joseph	Joseph	
2019	AWARDS FUNCTION WAS SUSPENDED DUE TO COVID-19 PANDEMIC			
2020–2021	Biju Menon	Ayyappan Nair	Ayyappanum Koshiyum	
2022	Kunchacko Boban	Kozhummal Rajeevan	Nna Thaan Case Kodu	
2023	Mammootty	James / Sundaram	Nanpakal Nerathu Mayakkam	
2024	Mammootty	Koduman Potti / Chaathan	Bramayugam	
