= M. Govindan =

Indian writer of Malayalam literature

- Born: 18 September 1919; Kuradadesham, Thrikkanapuram, Ponnani, Kerala, India
- Died: 23 January 1989 (aged 69); Guruvayur, Thrissur, Kerala, India
- Occupations: Writer, cultural activist
- Spouse: Dr K C Padmavathy
- Children: 2
- Writing career
- Genre: Poetry

Mancherath Thazhathethil Govindan (1919–1989) was an Indian writer of Malayalam literature and a cultural activist from Kerala, India. He was known for his writings as well as for his efforts in assisting Anand to publish his debut novel, Aalkkottam, and in the production of Swayamvaram, the debut movie of Dadasaheb Phalke laureate, Adoor Gopalakrishnan. His body of work comprises short stories, poems, articles and plays. He also wrote the screenplay for Nokkukuthi, a 1983 film by Mankada Ravi Varma.

== Biography ==
Govindan was born on 18 September 1919, at Kuradadesham, in Thrikkanapuram, Ponnani, Malappuram district of the south Indian state of Kerala to Kothayath Manakkal Chithran Nampoothiri and Mancherath Thazhathethil Devaki Amma. His schooling was at Higher Elementary School, Kuttippuram, and A.V. High School, Ponnani but had formal education only up to 9th standard. He became a socialist, reading Why Socialism by Jayaprakash Narayan, given to him by the poet Idassery Govindan Nair, but never a Marxist. When his mother remarried Karunakaran Nair, a police official based in Chennai and moved there, Govindan also settled in that city. According to the biography of Govindan, written by his close associate M. K. Sanoo, Govindan never took part in freedom movement and shifted to Madras only because his mother got married again. In 1944 he joined Madras Information service, shifted to Kerala Information Department along with his friend A. N. Nambiar, after states re organization; worked in the information service for 14 years. It was the British rule that recruited him, and the information service was propagating British views on Second World War. He was given a job at the recommendation of P. Balasubramanya Mudaliar, Editor of Sunday Observer, mouth piece of the Justice Party. Govindan had embraced the Radical Humanism of erstwhile Marxist M. N. Roy in 1939; both were against Gandhi and the Quit India movement. His friendship with Roy began when Roy, as Editor of Independent India, published Govindan's article, Caste and Class in South India. Subsequent exchange of letters made Govindan, a disciple of Roy. He had been in active politics prior to that and according to Sanoo, had written a couple of articles in leftist magazines such as Thozhilali and Rajyabhamani. C. J. Thomas met him in 1949, when he went to Madras and made an unsuccessful attempt to study MLitt, and joined the USIS. Their friendship ultimately bloomed in their joint effort against the first elected Communist Government in India, in the infamous liberation struggle, funded by the CIA. Govindan worked against the first Communist government of Kerala during 1957–1959, and exposed the Andhra rice scandal of that government, which was toppled by the CIA, according to the book, A Dangerous Place by Daniel Patrick Moynihan. Govindan organized several pamphlets against the government, one of which was written by Sanoo. In 1959, he resigned from service and concentrated on his intellectual career. He edited three magazines Navasahiti, Gopuram and Sameeksha and organised many academic forums for cultural debate. He spotted and groomed many young writers and artists through his magazines. He also wrote profusely both in Malayalam and English, but his creative works were largely in Malayalam.

Govindan was married to Dr. K. C. Padmavathy, who was a physician, and niece of artist K. C. S. Paniker. It was a love marriage, both she and Paniker were Royists. She had participated in Guruvayoor temple struggle. She translated William Saroyan's The Human Comedy and six stories of Isaac Bashevis Singer. Govimdan died on 23 January 1989, at the age of 69, in Guruvayur, Kerala.

== Legacy ==
Govindan's works include poems, short stories, plays, and essays. Besides, he wrote the screenplay for Nokkukuthi, a 1983 film by Mankada Ravi Varma, based on one of his own stories. While he was the editor of Sameeksha magazine, Anand wrote to him requesting for assistance for publishing his debut novel, Aalkkottamm and later Anand admitted that Govindan's intervention helped in the publication of the novel. His efforts have also been reported in the production and distribution of Swayamvaram, the debut movie of Adoor Gopalakrishnan.

== Bibliography ==
=== Short stories ===
- Govindan, M (1969). Maṇiyōrḍar̲uṃ Mat̲t̲u Kathakaḷuṃ. Kōṭṭayaṃ: Sāhityapr̲avarttaka Sahakaraṇasaṅghaṃ : [Sales Dept.], Nāṣanal Bukkst̲āḷ. OCLC 31221520.
- Govindan, M (2003). M. Gōvindant̲e Kathakaḷ. Kottayam: Ḍi. Si. Buks. ISBN 9788126406272. OCLC 54529141.

=== Poetry ===
- Govindan, M (1978). Oru Ponnānikkāran̲te Manōrājyaṃ (in Malayalam). Parappanaṅṅāṭi: Samīkṣa. OCLC 8805195.
- Govindan, M; Nārāyaṇapiḷḷa, Ke. Es. Kavita. Koccin?: Kēraḷa Kavitāgrandhavari. OCLC 36778815.
- Govindan, M (1978). Nāṭṭuveḷichaṃ (in Malayalam). Parappanaṅṅāṭi: Samīkṣa. OCLC 8805260.

=== Edited works ===
- Govindan, M (1974). Poetry and renaissance: Kumaran Asan birth centenary volume. Madras: Sameeksha. OCLC 2834828.
- Govindan (2014). Poetry and renaissance: Kumaran Asan birth centenary volume. Chennai: Blaze Media, P K Sreenivasan Chennai. OCLC 2834828.

=== Essays ===
- Govindan, M (1986). M. Gōvindant̲e Upanyāsaṅṅaḷ. Kōṭṭayaṃ: Sāhityapr̲avarttaka Sahakaraṇasaṅghaṃ : Nāṣanal Bukkst̲āḷ. OCLC 18226024.
- Govindan, M (1967). Samasyakaḷ Sameepanaṅgaḷ (in Malayalam). Place of publication not identified: Sales Dept. OCLC 25147844.
- Govindan, M (1978). Araṅgēt̲t̲aṃ (in Malayalam). Parappanaṅṅāṭi: Samīkṣa. OCLC 8476430.

=== Works on M. Govindan ===
- Unnikkannan, M. T. (2017). Anaadham Ee Agniveena: M Govindhante Jeevithanaalvazhikkanakk (in Malayalam) (1 ed.). Thiruvananthapuram: MaluBen Publications. ISBN 9789384795184.
- Rādhākr̥iṣhṇan, E (2008). M. Gōvindan, Jeevithavuṃ Aaśayavuṃ. Kottayam: Ḍ. C. Buks. ISBN 9788126422159. OCLC 317778495.
- Śr̲eedharan, I. V (1993). M. Gōvindan Smaraṇika. New Mahe, Kerala: Malayāḷa Kalāgrāmaṁ. OCLC 45759159.
- Sanoo M K ( 2002)/M Govindan, D C Books

== See also ==
- Malayalam literature
- List of Indian poets
