= Arising from the Surface =

1980 film

- Directed by: Mani Kaul
- Written by: Mani Kaul
- Starring: Bharath Gopi
- Cinematography: Virendra Saini
- Release date: 1980
- Running time: 114 minutes
- Country: India
- Language: Hindi

Arising from the Surface (Hindi: सतह से उठता आदमी) is a 1980 Indian film directed by Mani Kaul. It was screened in the Un Certain Regard section at the 1981 Cannes Film Festival. This is an essay film grounded in the writings of Gajanan Madhav Muktibodh the prominent 20th century Hindi writer, poet, essayist, literary and political critic.

== Plot ==
The screenplay of this film is based on two poems, two essays and six short stories by Gajanan Madhav Muktibodh and the title of film is taken from one of his short story used in the film. The film is neither a biopic nor an adaptation, or an essay, nor fiction, and yet it engages with all these forms producing a cinematic text that defies any categorization. The narrative is fashioned around three characters: Ramesh (Bharath Gopi), who embodies Muktibodh's subjectivity, where as Madhav (Jha) and Keshav (M. K. Raina) are his companions. All three saunter in and out of numerous mise-en-scène, driven by the political, philosophical underpinnings of Muktibodh's universe.

== Cast ==
- Bharath Gopi as Ramesh
- Vibhuti Jha as Madhav
- Satyen Kumar
- M. K. Raina as Keshav
