= Paradeshi =

- Theatrical Poster
- Directed by: P. T. Kunju Muhammed
- Written by: P. T. Kunju Muhammed
- Produced by: Antony Perumbavoor
- Starring: Mohanlal; Swetha Menon; Lakshmi Gopalaswamy; Padmapriya Janakiraman
- Cinematography: K. G. Jayan
- Edited by: Don Max
- Music by: Songs: Ramesh Narayan; Shahabaz Aman; Background Score: Ramesh Narayan
- Production company: Aashirvad Cinemas
- Distributed by: Pyramid Saimira
- Release date: 24 October 2007
- Running time: 135 minutes
- Country: India
- Language: Malayalam

Paradeshi (transl. Foreigner) is a 2007 Indian Malayalam-language drama film written and directed by P. T. Kunju Muhammed. It was produced by Antony Perumbavoor under the company Aashirvad Cinemas. Mohanlal plays Valiyakaththu Moosa, in three stages of his life, between the ages of 35 and 80. It also features Swetha Menon, Lakshmi Gopalaswamy, Padmapriya Janakiraman, Jagathy Sreekumar, and Siddique in significant roles.

The film portrays the issue of Indian citizens who left the country before the partition of India in search of job, mostly to Arabia, and happened to reach Pakistan, and then when they returned to the homeland, happened to be holding a Pakistani passport. They are now being forced by the Indian authorities to go to Pakistan, and even the Pakistani authorities won't take them.

== Plot ==
Valiyakathu Moosa is an Indian Muslim who moves from the Malabar region of Kerala, India to Karachi, Pakistan during the British Raj in search of a job. Post-partition, he returns from Pakistan and settles down in Malappuram, Kerala. This man, who lives as a true Indian, doesn't get his Indian passport and thus an Indian identity in the official sense, even after 50 years of Independence.

Indian police harass him and his neighbours in a similar situation as Pakistani spies. The film has Mohanlal playing the character in three stages of his life, between the ages of 35 and 80

== Cast ==
- Mohanlal as Valiyakathu Moosa
- Siddique as Musthafa Hamza
- Swetha Menon as Aamina
- Jagathy Sreekumar as Abdul Rahman
- Lakshmi Gopalaswami as Khadeeja
- Padmapriya Janakiraman as Usha, journalist
- Jagadish as Vettissery Aboobacker
- T. G. Ravi as Usman
- Madhupal as Adv. Pradeep
- Vijayaraghavan as Koch Ousep
- VK Sreeraman as Adv. Ramakrishnan
- Cochin Haneefa as Head Constable
- Bharath Gopi
- Nilambur Ayesha
- Suresh Krishna as Ravi Tharakan
- Irshad as Prakashan
- Sona Nair
- Sreenath
- Ambika Mohan as Valiykath Moosa's mother
- Zeenath
- Manka Mahesh
- Rema Devi
- Deepika Mohan

== Production ==
The film was produced by Antony Perumbavoor under the banner of Aashirvad Cinemas and A&A Productions. The locations of the film included Ottappalam in Kerala and Rajasthan.

== Music ==
The music was composed by Ramesh Narayan and Shahabaz Aman.

Paradeshi

Soundtrack album by Ramesh Narayan and Shahabaz Aman
- Released: 2007
- Recorded: 2007
- Language: Malayalam
- Producer: Ramesh Narayan

Paradeshi
No.	Title	Lyrics	Music	Artist(s)	Length
1.	"Aananda Kanneerin"	Rafeeq Ahammed	Ramesh Narayan	Sujatha Mohan; Manjari
2.	"Thattam Pidichu"	Rafeeq Ahammed	Ramesh Narayan	Sujatha Mohan
3.	"Thattam Pidichu (Unplugged)"	Rafeeq Ahammed	Ramesh Narayan	Sujatha Mohan
4.	"Ya Dhuni Dhuni"	Rafeeq Ahammed	Shahabaz Aman	M. G. Sreekumar; Vineeth Sreenivasan

== Release ==
The film was released on 24 October 2007 theatrically by Pyramid Saimira.

== Awards ==
National Film Awards

- National Film Award for Best Make-up Artist – Pattanam Rasheed

Kerala State Film Awards

- Best Actor – Mohanlal
- Best Story – P. T. Kunju Muhammed
- Best Makeup Artist – Pattanam Rasheed
- Special Jury Award – Jagathy Sreekumar
- Best Dubbing Artist – Hafsath, Zeenath

Kerala Film Critics Association Awards

- Best Actor – Mohanlal
- Best Actress – Lakshmi Gopalaswami
- Best Make-up Artist – Pattanam Rasheed

Filmfare Awards South

- Best Actor – Mohanlal
- Best Supporting Actress – Lakshmi Gopalaswami
