= Kodiyettam =

Kodiyettam (Ascent)
- Poster
- Directed by: Adoor Gopalakrishnan
- Written by: Adoor Gopalakrishnan
- Produced by: Kulathoor Bhaskaran Nair
- Starring: Bharath Gopi; K. P. A. C. Lalitha
- Cinematography: Mankada Ravi Varma
- Edited by: M. Mani
- Production company: Chitralekha Film Society
- Distributed by: Chitralekha Film Society
- Release date: 12 May 1978
- Running time: 128 minutes
- Country: India
- Language: Malayalam

Kodiyettam is a 1978 Malayalam-language film written and directed by Adoor Gopalakrishnan. The film stars Bharat Gopy in the lead role. Notable smaller roles were played by K. P. A. C. Lalitha, Kuttyedathi Vilasini, Azeez and Adoor Bhawani. The film depicts the life of Shankaran Kutty, a carefree simpleton who eventually rises to be a mature, responsible adult. The title of the film translates to 'Ascent' which symbolizes the growth of Shankaran Kutty.

The film was Bharat Gopy's second film, the first being Adoor Gopalakrishnan's Swayamvaram. The film is his first role as one of the main characters. The film notably does not feature any kind of background music and in the director's cut some scenes are missing. The film was produced by the Chitralekha Film Society, an organization cofounded by Gopalakrishnan himself. This was the second and last film produced by Gopalakrishnan under the banner.

The film received widespread critical acclaim. It was one of the pioneering films of the new wave cinema movement in Malayalam cinema. The film won two National Film Awards. Bharat Gopy's portrayal of Shankaran Kutty won him the National Film Award for Best Actor and Adoor Gopalakrishnan won the National Award for Best Feature Film in Malayalam. Kodiyettam swept the Kerala State Film Awards of the year as well. It won Bharat Gopy his first Kerala State Film Award for Best Actor. Adoor Gopalakrishnan won the Best Film, Best Director and Best Story Awards and N. Sivan won the Best Art Director and The film is regarded a classic in psychology cinema.

== Plot ==
The film captures the ascent of the protagonist, Shankaran Kutty, from a carefree individual to a mature responsible adult. The opening sequences shows Shankaran Kutty attending a temple festival. The film proceeds to show the irresponsible and often nomadic life style of Shankaran Kutty. Shankaran Kutty, though seemingly at the beginning of middle age, spends most of his time playing around with children, joining political processions and helping the villagers when he is not attending temple festivals. He is provided for by his younger sister who works as a house maid in the city of Thiruvananthapuram. His sister in an attempt to get his life organized arranges a marriage for him. But to the dismay of his new wife, Shankaran Kutty continues his life style often staying away from home for weeks. The already pregnant wife soon leaves him, and Shankaran Kutty does not make any attempt to have her back at home.

Shankaran Kutty's life takes a turn from there on. His sister starts living in their family home with her new husband and slowly he finds himself out of place. Shankaran Kutty guilelessness starts brushing away, it is shown through a sub-plot in the movie. He realizes the hard realities of human life, when the widow who used to act as a patron for him commits suicide after being cheated in love. He reaches a turning point in his life when he joins as a truck driver assistant. Though he finds the job too much to handle at first, he slowly adapts to the new responsibilities of life. He starts making amends with his wife. The film ends when Shankaran Kutty has a happy reunion with his wife and newborn daughter.

The film has a structure that resembles a typical Kerala temple festival. The title itself is an allusion to Shankaran Kutty recognizing and beginning his life of responsibilities like the traditional first ceremony in the temple festivals where a flag is hoisted to mark the beginning of the proceedings. The director commented that the film's most important connection to the festivals is the fact that in both nothing really happens; the only notable thing in both is the very presence of the people and events.

== Cast ==
- Bharath Gopi as Shankarankutty
- K. P. A. C. Lalitha as Shanthamma
- Kuttyedathi Vilasini as Sarojini
- Kaviyoor Ponnamma as Kamalam
- Azeez as Truck Driver
- P. K. Venukuttan Nair
- Thikkurisi Sukumaran Nair as Sukumara Pillai
- Adoor Bhawani as Shanthamma's mother
- Adoor Pankajam as Pankajakshi
- Aranmula Ponnamma as Neighbour
- k.varadarajan nair as sankaran nair . Sankarankutty s friend

== Themes and critical commentary ==
Kodiyettam interweaves multiple aspects of a rural society with astonishing character growth of a man named Shankarankutty. In the initial parts of the movie Shankarankutty is portrayed as an immature man who lives a life mostly unaware of what is happening around him; a poor individual who is unable to associate and indulge in his surroundings. He was also a bit slow minded; in a scene when Shankarankutty was walking alongside a road a truck sped by him drenching him in muddy water however Shankarankutty admires the truck for its speed as if not realizing his shirt has been dirtied. Yet Shankarankutty always wanted to do things others were able to do. However he could do them only after he came in touch with a lorry driver. Shankarankutty always cherished an emotional connection with the widow who committed suicide because of the illicit relationship. Although he had doubts regarding her behavior he could never actually come up with any true evidence by sight but only by sounds. Whenever he got a chance to meet Sukumara Pillai and the widow together, there had to be some distractions which made it difficult for him to see what really happened between the two or what did they talk to each other, if they talked anything. His evidences for their relationship is supported by them talking to each other (audio) rather than being able to see them together (visual) . He knew the reason for her suicide only by overhearing the two speaking about her illegal conception. This fortune of not being able to see her with another man helps him to maintain ideal images of the two; a generous dutiful mother and widow Savithriyamma and the well-respected master, Sukumara Pillai.

It is not from any morally perfect person that the transformation in Shanakarankutty is taking place but from a man with loose morals (the lorry driver) that he becomes what he is ultimately. Shankarankutty had many unfulfilled desires like-to have a relationship with the widow, to have promiscuous relationship like the lorry driver, to control something which he would never be able to do (once he tries to occupy his master, lorry driver's seat) etc. He found most of these things have been done by others who had certain authority over their life, who would not rather spend their time on trifles like going for processions or attending festivals (like he did most of the time). One such men who had certain authority over his life is the lorry driver rather a well-respected person, like the master who had an affair with the widow.

== Reception ==
The film was a commercial success, uncommon for art house films.

Syamaprasad in an interview with Asianet, says that: "My favorite Adoor movie. The simplicity and charm of its narration is a refreshing change from the cliché-ridden patterns of the so-called ‘Art-Movie’ genre. Coming of age story of a village simpleton, told through a chain of events and characters often funny and occasionally sad, and his ultimate ascent into the responsibilities of adulthood, is the core storyline. The script by Adoor himself is structurally flawless and often poignant. Great austerity is maintained in all aspects of production; from production design to sound design, and it lends the film a credibility and rawness, which only enforces the central theme better. Adoor's restraint in using background score, practically none in this movie – I see it as a filmmaker's integrity towards a realistic representation of the life as it is.

K Venugopal of The New Indian Express writes, praising Gopy's performance in the film: "Shankarankutty was so brilliant in portrayal onscreen that it seemed absolutely natural. You knew a Shankarankutty from your hamlet and your childhood. If you looked deep down inside yourself, you could even find him leaning against the mudwall of your mind, giving you the gap-toothed smile that glowed from the heart. That in effect was the sheer simplicity and profundity of the character. And that was what earned him the legendary Bharat Award."

Film critic S. Rana writes: "The film moves in a slow rhythm of rural life lingering and dwelling on little things: a man absorbed in eating, a woman washing clothes, a man chopping wood (splinters stick to his body as he wipes the perspiration) or a bullock cart driver singing a philosophical song about the vanities of the world. Adoor is never in a hurry. There is understanding and compassion for the suffering of women in the Indian set up. And the festival in the temple moves with the languorous dignity of an elephant (there is a great sequence of an elephant being bathed as Sankaran watches in goggle eyed wonderment) in parallel [sic] with the festival of life in the hamlet."

== Awards ==
The film won the following awards:

National Film Awards - 1978

- Best Actor - Bharath Gopi
- Best Feature Film in Malayalam

Kerala State Film Awards - 1978

- Best Film
- Best Actor - Bharath Gopi
- Best Story - Adoor Gopalakrishnan
- Best Director - Adoor Gopalakrishnan
- Best Art Director - N.Sivan

== Legacy ==
Gopi was hitherto a relatively unknown actor, though he had appeared briefly in Adoor's first movie, Swayamvaram. Kodiyettam catapulted him to such a popularity that he became known as Kodiyettam Gopi. He won the national award for the best actor (also known as Bharat Award) for his performance in Kodiyettam. He started being known as Bharath Gopi thereafter, and even legally adopted this name. In 2017, Kamal Haasan included the film in his list of 70 favorite movies, stating "Adoor has made so many beautiful films but the simplicity of Kodiyettam is unsurpassed."
