= Yamanam =

- Archana and Bharath Gopi at the shooting location
- Directed by: Bharath Gopi
- Screenplay by: George Onakkoor
- Produced by: Ajayan Varicolil
- Starring: Archana; Ramachandran; Santha Devi; Syama; Nedumudi Venu
- Cinematography: Suresh P Nair
- Edited by: Venugopal
- Music by: G. Devarajan
- Release date: 1992
- Running time: 99 minutes
- Country: India
- Language: Malayalam

Yamanam is a 1992 Malayalam film, directed by Bharath Gopi, and starring Archana, Santha Devi, Syama and Nedumudi Venu.

== Plot ==
A physically disabled girl Ambili (Archana) is restricted to a wheelchair because of a childhood attack of polio. Unable to move out of home, she has only to fantasize the exteriors. She turns terribly introvert, fathoming the truth within and becoming positive towards people. She is skilled at making models and toys. She and her widowed mother are gradually sidelined in their own home by her brother Devan and his wife Raji. She and her mother feel isolated when her brother and wife leaves home. Then one of the house models made by Ambili is sold for a good sum, and she becomes more energetic about her work. A doctor proposes to marry Ambili, but she refuses because of the realization that his feeling are only based on sympathy.

== Awards ==
The film won the following awards:

National Film Awards – 1992

- Best Film on Other Social Issues
- Best Supporting Actress – Santha Devi

Kerala State Film Awards - 1991

- Best Background Music - G.Devarajan

== Cast ==
- Archana
- Ramachandran
- Santha Devi
- Nedumudi Venu
- Syama
