= Karamana Janardanan Nair =

Indian actor

- Born: 25 July 1936
- Died: 24 April 2000 (aged 63)
- Other name: Karamana
- Occupation: Actor
- Spouse: Jaya J. Nair
- Children: Sudheer Karamana; Sujay; Sunil
- Parent: Karamana Kunjuveettil Ramaswami Iyyer Bhargaviyamma

Karamana Janardanan Nair (25 July 1936 – 24 April 2000) was an Indian actor, who was active during the 1980s and 1990s in the Malayalam film industry. He was especially known for his character roles. He won wide acclaim especially for the role of the protagonist in Adoor Gopalakrishnan's Elippathayam (1981). He notably played the villain role in Pattanapravesham(1988). He played the lead role in the K. G. George directed film Mattoral, supported by Mammootty, which was released in 1988. His last role was as Fr. Paulose in the movie FIR (1999) and died a year later.

== Personal life ==
He was born to Karamana Kunjuveettil Ramaswami Iyyer and Bhargaviyamma on 27 July 1936. He had his primary education from Govt Model Boys High School, Chalai. After doing B.A., he pursued L.L.B. from Government Law College, Thiruvananthapuram. He also holds Masters in History from University College Thiruvananthapuram. He worked at Employees Provident Fund Organisation in Pattom and Akasahvani. He was an active member of Thiruvananthapuram drama clubs. He went to study at National School of Drama in 1962.

He was married to Jaya J Nair. The couple have three children Sunil, Sudheer and Sujay. His son, Sudheer Karamana, is also an actor. He died of a massive stroke complicated by prolonged diabetes on 24 April 2000, aged 64.

== Filmography ==
- Ente Priyappetta Muthuvinu (2000)
- F.I.R. (1999) as Fr. Paulose
- The Truth (1998)
- Pranayavarnagal (1998) as Maya's Father
- Raktha Sakshikal Sindabad (1998) as Raman Thirumulpadu
- Kaliyoonjal (1997) as Raghavan master
- Janathipathyam (1997) as Kannan Menon
- Kalyana Unnikal (1997) as Musakutty Musaliyar
- Mahaathma (1996) as Ramakrishna Kurup
- Agnidevan (1995) as Vasudeva Warrier
- Spadikam (1995) as Fr. Ottaplakkan
- Vrudhanmare Sookshikkuka (1995) as Goda Varma
- Commissioner (1994) as Justice Mahendran
- Bharya (1994) as Shankaran Nair
- Malappuram Haji Mahanaya Joji (1994)
- Bhagyavan (1994) as Mulankattu Gurukkal
- Sraadham (1994)
- Moonnam Loka Pattalam (1994) as Rama Varma
- Varabhalam (1994) as Geetha's father
- Golanthara Vartha (1993) as Lekha's father
- Ammayane Sathyam (1993) as Omanakuttan's Father
- Janam (1993) as Ananthan
- Oru Kochu Bhoomikilukkam (1992) as Bhargavan Pillai
- Adharam as Abdullah
- Cheppadi Vidya (1992) as Thankappan
- Nayam Vaykkthamaakkunnu (1991)
- Kalamorukkam (1991) as Shekharan Thampi
- Bhoomika (1991) as Memana Madhava Panikkar
- Aanaval Mothiram (1991) as Home Minister Ramachandra Kurup
- Kizhakkunarum Pakshi (1991) as Krishnan Namboothiri
- Parallel College (1991)
- His Highness Abdulla (1990) as Prabhakara Varma
- Malayogam (1990) as Mathachan
- Sasneham (1990) as Thamarassery Kuriachan
- Kalikkalam (1990) as Public Prosecutor Aravindan
- Mathilukal (1990) as Raghavan
- Mudra (1989) as Pathrose
- Utharam (1989) as Fr. Kunnathoor
- Mazhavilkavadi (1989) as Nanukuttan
- Dasharatham (1989) as Pillai
- Padippura (1989)
- Artham (1989) as George Zachariah
- Adhipan (1989) as Peethambaran
- Vellanakalude Nadu (1988) as Radhakrishnan Nair
- Mattoral (1988) as Kaimal
- Ponmuttayidunna Thaaraavu (1988) as Hajjiyar
- Ambalakkara Panjayathu (1988)
- Dhwani (1988) as Kuttisankaran
- Dinarathrangal (1988) as Sankarath Madhava Menon
- Pattanapravesham (1988) as Prabhakaran Thampi
- Swargam (1987)
- Itha Samayamayi (1987) as Parameshwaran Pillai
- January Oru Orma (1987) as Ponnayyan
- Amrutham Gamaya (1987) as Medical College Professor
- Ice Cream (1986)
- Meenamasathile Sooryan (1986) as Janmi
- Ozhivukaalam (1985) as Ramachandran
- Thinkalaazhcha Nalla Divasam (1985) as Narayanankutty
- Avidathe Pole Ivideyum (1985)
- Puli Varunne Puli (1985) as Commissioner
- Oru Naal Innoru Naal (1985)
- Mukhamukham (1984)
- Arorumariyathe (1984) as Rama Varma
- Ariyatha Veethikal (1984) as Bhaskaran
- Aduthaduthu (1984) as Ayyappan
- Elippathayam (1981) as Unni
- Swayamvaram (1972) as Thommachan
- Urangaatha Sundari (1969) as Adv John (uncredited role)

== Television ==
- Kairali Vilasam Lodge (Doordarshan)
- Pakshi Sasthram (Telefilm, Doordarshan)
- Kittunni Ammavan Vannu (Doordarshan 1993)
