= Swayamvaram (1972 film) =

- Theatrical release poster
- Directed by: Adoor Gopalakrishnan
- Written by: Adoor Gopalakrishnan; K. P. Kumaran
- Story by: Adoor Gopalakrishnan
- Starring: Madhu; Sharada; Adoor Bhavani; K. P. A. C. Lalitha; Thikkurisi Sukumaran Nair; Bharat Gopy
- Cinematography: Mankada Ravi Varma
- Edited by: Ramesan
- Music by: M. B. Sreenivasan
- Production company: Chitralekha Film Co-operative
- Distributed by: Chitralekha Film Co-operative
- Release date: 24 November 1972
- Running time: 131 minutes
- Country: India
- Language: Malayalam
- Budget: ₹250,000 (US$2,700)

Swayamvaram (English: One's Own Choice) is a 1972 Indian Malayalam-language drama film co-written and directed by Adoor Gopalakrishnan, starring Madhu and Sharada in the lead roles. Notable smaller roles were played by Thikkurisi Sukumaran Nair, Adoor Bhavani, K. P. A. C. Lalitha, and Bharat Gopy. The film depicts the life of a couple—Vishwam (Madhu) and Sita (Sharada)—who have married against their parents' wishes and want to start a new life at a new place. The title is an allusion to the ancient Indian practice of a girl of marriageable age choosing a husband from among a list of suitors.

Swayamvaram marked several debuts—directorial of Gopalakrishnan, acting of the Malayalam star Bharat Gopy, and film producing of the Chitralekha Film Cooperative, an organisation cofounded by Gopalakrishnan himself. The film features an original score by M. B. Sreenivasan, camerawork by Mankada Ravi Varma, and film editing by Ramesan. Writer-director K. P. Kumaran co-scripted the film with Gopalakrishnan. It took seven years for Gopalakrishnan to get the project rolling when his initial proposal for a loan to make a film was turned down by the Film Finance Corporation (FFC). The FFC later partially financed the film when Chitralekha provided the rest.

The film received widespread critical acclaim. It pioneered the new wave cinema movement in Malayalam cinema and became one of the first Malayalam films to use synchronised sound and outdoor locales. The film also became the first Indian film to use sound as a leitmotif. It was shown at various film festivals around the world like Moscow International Film Festival, and won four National Film Awards at the 20th National Film Awards in 1973, including Best Feature Film, Best Director for Gopalakrishnan, and Best Actress for Sharada.

== Plot ==
A newly wed couple, Vishwam and Sita, have married against the preference of their families, and left their hometown. Both want to start a new life at a new place. Initially, they stay in a decent hotel but financial constraints soon force them to move to an ordinary hotel.

Vishwam, an educated, unemployed youth, is an aspiring writer and had some of his short stories published in newspapers earlier. He dreams of having his novel, titled Nirvriti (Ecstasy), published in a newspaper. He meets a newspaper editor, who agrees to read his novel but later declines to publish it, stating the novel is too sentimental. Sita is offered a job as a sales girl but cannot accept it because she is unable to pay the required security deposit of ₹ 1,000. With several unsuccessful attempts to get a job, the increasing financial pressure forces them to shift to a slum. With an old lady named Janaki and a prostitute named Kalyani as their neighbours, things do not work as desired for the couple and they end up selling Sita's jewellery.

Vishwam takes a job as a zoology teacher in college but soon loses it. He then accepts a job as a clerk in a timber shop with a meager salary, replacing one of the dismissed employees. Vishwam and Sita try to set up a happy home with their newborn baby, but soon their dreams fade as they struggle on precariously. When Vishwam falls ill, Sita tries for his betterment with all her capabilities but is unable to afford the medicines. She finally decides to call a doctor. However, Vishwam dies, leaving her alone with their infant baby. When Sita is advised to return to her parents after Vishwam's death, she declines. The film ends with Sita feeding her baby and gazing at a painting on the from an Indian Hindu epic, Ramayana, depicting Sita Swayamvara and determinedly at the closed door of their house.

== Cast ==
- Madhu as Vishwam
- Sharada as Sita
- Adoor Bhavani as Janaki
- K. P. A. C. Lalitha as Kalyani, a prostitute
- Thikkurissy Sukumaran Nair as a college principal
- P. K. Venukuttan Nair as Vasu, a small-time smuggler
- Vaikom Chandrasekharan Nair as an editor
- Karamana Janardanan Nair as Thommachan
- Bharat Gopy as a dismissed employee

== Production ==
=== Title ===
The title refers to the ancient Indian practice of a girl of marriageable age choosing a husband from among a list of suitors. It was also an affirmation to one of Mohandas Karamchand Gandhi's beliefs about an individual's right to make own choices. The film's English title for international release was mainly One's Own Choice, however it was shown at the Moscow International Film Festival under the title, On Own Will. Other translations of the Malayalam title have also been used, such as By Choice, Her Own Choice, Marriage by Choice, Betrothal by Choice, The Betrothal, and The Selection.

=== Development ===
While studying in the Film and Television Institute of India, Pune, Gopalakrishnan was influenced by the New Wave movement of global cinema and formed a film society in Kerala, named "Chitralekha Film Cooperative", with his classmates in 1965. Gopalakrishnan had initially submitted a romantic script Kamuki to the Film Finance Corporation (now National Film Development Corporation of India or NFDC) which they declined to finance. Later, he submitted the script for Swayamvaram, which Film Finance Corporation accepted and approved the loan of a ₹150,000 (US$1,600). However, it took seven years for him to get the film rolling, after he passed out of the Film and Television Institute of India. Gopalakrishnan co-scripted the film with writer-director K. P. Kumaran. The film was produced by Chitralekha Film Co-operative, Kerala's first film co-operative society for film production, with Swayamvaram being their first feature film production. The film's total budget was ₹250,000 (US$2,700) and Gopalakrishnan used the money he had collected from his documentary productions. Initially, Chitralekha Film Co-operative, the producer of the film had trouble distributing the film, so they decided to do it by themselves.

Ritwik Ghatak's 1965 film Subarnarekha was an influence to Gopalakrishnan. The Bengali film dealt with post Partition and tells the story of a Hindu Brahmin refugee Ishwar who raises his sister Sita and Abhiram, the son of a low-caste woman from a refugee camp. When the two fall in love, he rejects the relation. Abhiram and Sita elope to Calcutta. Years later. Ishwar on a binge drinking spree in Calcutta, visits a brothel; where Sita recognizes him and kills herself. Gopalakrishnan wondered what would have happened to the couple that eloped to the city and developed his story.

=== Casting ===
Gopalakrishan wanted fresh faces for both the lead roles and he had written letters to various heads of colleges and universities for the auditions. However, he did not receive any response from anywhere. For the female lead, Gopalakrishnan approached Sharada, one of the most successful actresses of her time. She was acting in commercial films when Gopalakrishnan asked her to star in Swayamvaram. Sharada was initially reluctant to commit herself to an art film, but agreed when Gopalakrishnan narrated the complete story to her at Prasad Studios, in Chennai. The male lead for the film, Madhu, was an old friend of Gopalakrishnan and had expressed a desire to act in one of his films. By the time Gopalakrishnan finished his studies and returned from FTII, Madhu was already a star in Malayalam cinema. Gopalakrishnan then decided to cast him opposite Sharada. Mentioning about his experience working with Gopalakrishnan and Swayamvaram, Madhu recollected in an interview that "[...] when Gopalakrishnan narrated the story of Swayamvaram, I knew it was going to be different." Years later he also mentioned that he "sometimes wished Prem Nazir had acted in Adoor's Swayamvaram. He might have won a Bharat award. But he was very busy those days."

Malayalam actor-director Thikkurissy Sukumaran Nair was cast as a college principal. Bharat Gopy, who later became a major actor in the Malayalam film industry, made his film debut in Swayamvaram, doing a minor role as the dismissed factory employee who gets replaced by Madhu. Gopy was a noted stage actor before Swayamvaram and would later play the lead role in Gopalakrishnan's second feature film, Kodiyettam, which earned him a reputation as one of the finest actors in Indian cinema and also inspired his screen name as "Bharat Gopy" or "Kodiyettam Gopy". He won a Best Actor award, then known as "Bharat Award", for the role at the 25th National Film Awards in 1977.

K. P. A. C. Lalitha, who would later play notable characters in many of Gopalakrishnan's films, played a small role as a prostitute in Swayamvaram. Noted Malayalam writer and journalist Vaikom Chandrasekharan Nair played a newspaper editor in the film. Gopalakrishnan praised him for his performance, expressing the difficulties of performing as oneself onscreen.

=== Filming ===
Due to financial crises, it took more than one and a half years for Gopalakrishnan to finish the film. Swayamvaram was one of the first Malayalam films to use synchronised sound and to be filmed in outdoor locales, for which Gopalakrishnan used his Nagra audio recorder. The film was shot in two schedules. It was delayed due to scheduling conflicts of the lead actress, Sharada. She was working in several films at that time, so Gopalakrishnan had to arrange the schedule to suit her convenience. The lead actor, Madhu, mentioned in an interview that Gopalakrishnan was clear about his characters and their behaviour. Gopalakrishnan also used to discuss the shoot with his crew before the shooting.

The film marked the beginning of a collaboration between Gopalakrishnan and cinematographer Mankada Ravi Varma. Gopalakrishnan had seen Varma's work in his second film as a cinematographer, Olavum Theeravum (1970), and when he decided to work on Swayamvaram, Gopalakrishnan approached Varma with the script. Initially reluctant, Varma agreed to do the film due to its "extensive" and "very well written" script. Incidentally, Varma won his only National Film Award for Best Cinematography, with a career spanned over thirty years, for Swayamvaram. The film featured no songs and has only an original score by M. B. Sreenivasan. The editing of the film was done by Ramesan, whereas S. S. Nair and Devadathan worked together on the production design. Sound mixing was done by P. Devadas. The total budget of the film was ₹250,000 (US$2,700), where the Film Finance Corporation provided ₹ 150,000 as a loan.

== Themes ==
Nirad Mohapatra in the book, Cinema in India wrote, "Adoor, coming as he does from a small-town middle class milieu in Kerala – made his first film, Swayamvaram on the moral crisis of the middle class. It is about an unmarried young couple, intensely in love, escaping to a small town to live together, defying the conventional norms and coming to grips with the harsh realities of life and living, which turns their dream into a nightmare. The struggle between the ideal and the real, love and the fear of losing the object of love, the crisis of conscience caused by the pressure of mundane needs, bring to the fore the human predicament, the spiritual degeneration of man – a theme which recurs in his later films too. Swayamvaram means choice, but the choice in this case is between the devil and the deep sea- a devastating commentary on the socio-economic situation of the middle class." In an interview Gopalakrishnan said, "Swayamvaram is a trip from illusion to reality. It is a typical case of the moral crisis of the middle class."

Some critics have pointed out its resemblance to Ritwik Ghatak's Subarnarekha (1965). Gopalakrishnan agreed on influences of Ghatak and Satyajit Ray but pointed that Swayamvaram's treatment is different from Ghatak's Subarnarekha as Swayamvaram is more about the trip. In an interview Gopalakrishnan said, "Swayamvaram is a trip from illusion to reality. It is a typical case of the moral crisis of the middle class." A reviewer from Soviet Culture wrote, "The film Swayamvaram directed by Adoor Gopalakrishnan shows in all its starkness, the plight of the educated unemployed in India. It dwells on the trials and tribulations of a young couple and their persistent efforts to find a place of their own in the society.The Hero is an idealist and an upright character.In the end, the hardships of life claim his life itself. This competition film that comes from India is a true reflection of the life of the common man in India."

Suranjan Ganguly, in his book, The Films of Adoor Gopalakrishnan, wrote, "It was a call to arms against the crude, melodramatic, formulaic films of the south, especially Kerala. It bristled with innovative visual and auditory effects and boasted a complex narrative form—a mix of documentary, fiction, and fantasy—that sought to interrogate film as film. It also subscribed to an evocative poetic realism drawing on metaphor and symbol, which was unprecedented in the history of southern cinema. Swayamvaram, like Elippathayam (1981) and Vidheyan (1994), focuses on the politics of dislocation and survival (both physical and moral) in which the search for home, self and identity becomes a key issue."

== Release ==
The previews of the film were held at various places, where it was well received by critics and audiences. Noted writer M. Govindan wrote a cover story in his magazine Sameeksha, and organized a seminar on the film in Chennai, then known as Madras. Various intellectuals and writers took part in it, including noted film experts like P. Bhaskaran and director Balu Mahendra.

== Reception ==
=== Critical response ===
A reviewer from The Guardian wrote, "Gopalakrishnan has laid bare the realities of a village society, a reality which has hitherto lain buried under the tinsel of commercial cinema." Dilys Powel from The Times wrote, "The theme is human and social. Adoor Gopalakrishnan's “Swayamvaram” has a touching performance by an actress called Sharada as the radiant girl who elopes, only to see her fight against convention end in poverty and despair. One detects a kind of sober passion." George Melly from The Observer wrote, "Swayamvaram directed by Adoor Gopalakrishnan is the story about a young couple who decide to live together and run into disaster. Beautifully photographed." Verina Glaessner from TimeOut wrote, "The film concentrates on describing the life together of the man and the woman who are unmarried and without the usual supportive network of family relationships. The Director constantly works to extend the film's area of concern outward to the situation they find themselves in, through their attempts to get work – she as a sales lady, he first as a teacher and then as a clerk in a saw mill. But he does this without any heavy handed over-emphasis." A reviewer from Pravda wrote, "The film Swayamvaram made in Kerala by Adoor Gopalakrishnan deserves special attention for the reason that it is a film far removed from the conventional song and dance extravaganza of Bombay Studios.The film's main concern is with the everyday life of the common man.The heart-beats of a complex and problem-ridden society are heard and felt in the tragic story of Sita and Viswam."

A reviewer from The Indian Express wrote, "Adoor Gopalakrishnan's Swayamvaram is a brilliant study of a run-away couple's trials and tribulations in making both ends meet. And quite naturally, one finds the stamp of the documentary in the film. The black and white photography is excellent, so is the music.” Filmfare wrote, "In Swayamvaram, Adoor Gopalakrishnan manages that rare feat investing the visuals with such eloquence that language of the spoken word hardly remains a barrier." A critic from the Hindustan Times termed it a "Chekovian film" and wrote, " Life's minor details are carefully studied, discretely and meaningfully portrayed." A critic of The Economic Times wrote, "The Kerala that Adoor Gopalakrishnan (who has both written the story and directed the film) shows is quite ruthlessly shorn of all the picturesque cliches that one is accustomed to associate with it. Another quality of the film which in the Indian context is remarkable is the handling of humor. In Swayamvaram, the humor is entirely natural." Link wrote, "The accent is solely on visuals. And these visuals are rarely interfered with, by verbosity.The extreme economy of words dramatises the picturisation of commonplace events."

Although most of the reviews were positive, some film experts were critical about the film. Amaresh Datta, in his book The Encyclopaedia of Indian Literature, criticised the film for "following the neo-realistic style" and showcasing "same old love story without any freshness added". Poet and journalist C. P. Surendran called the film "disturbing" in one of his articles, criticising Gopalakrishnan and his films. Shyam Benegal, a film director and a well-known admirer of Gopalakrishnan's films, also mentioned that he was not particularly pleased with Swayamvaram.

Despite the overwhelming critical acclaim the film received, the film was largely ignored in Kerala, which Gopalakrishnan referred to as "more of a question of insensitivity rather than personal enmity." However, some noted critics like Moorkoth Kunhappa and T. M. P. Nedungadi praised the movie, with Nedungadi writing a response titled "Swayamvaram over, what next in Malayalam cinema?"

=== Box office ===
The film had a lukewarm initial theatrical response. Gopalakrishnan was told that "If only he had some songs in it, it would have done well". After the announcement of the National Film Awards, the film was re-released in theatres and gathered better response this time, which also helped Gopalakrishnan repay the loan to FFC, the main producer of the film. The film participated in the competition section of the 8th Moscow International Film Festival in 1973.

== Legacy ==
Swayamvaram pioneered the new wave cinema movement in Malayalam cinema. The film did not feature any dance numbers, comedy or melodramatic scenes, which were "usual ingredients" of films at that time, but it introduced viewers to then unknown techniques of film presentation, in which it was not merely used for "story-telling". It was an inevitable development for Malayalam cinema, as the film focused mainly on cinema rather than its story. The film also introduced film-goers to a new cinematic art through the impulses generated by the film, which in turn were more important than the film itself. The film is also said to have divided Malayalam films into three different categories, "uncompromising art films", "compromising films" which aimed at commercial success but tried maintaining a good deal of the artistic qualities, and the "commercial films" which purely aimed at box office success. Film critic Kozhikodan included Swayamvaram on his list of the 10 best Malayalam movies of all time.

Through Swayamvaram, Gopalakrishnan became the first Indian director to use sound as a leitmotif (a recurring musical theme). The film provided a new experience to Indian cinema-goers, as it used ample amounts of natural sounds with a minimalistic background score.

Noted critic and film director Vijayakrishnan mentioned that Devadas's sound mixing work was one of the major attractions of the film. Considerable use of natural sound, apart from background music, was new for Malayalam cinema. Cast performances were also praised by critics. Bharat Gopy received considerable attention even for his minimal screen appearance. Though Madhu had acted previously in several films, including Ramu Kariat's National Award-winning film, Chemmeen (1965), Swayamvaram marked a turning point in his career.

The National Film Archive of India has digitally restored the film, and the restored version with improved subtitles in English was screened at the International Film Festival of India in November 2012. Also, the University of Wisconsin–Milwaukee has acquired all of Gopalakrishnan's features, including Swayamvaram, to restore and preserve.

== Awards ==
1973 Moscow International Film Festival (Russia)

- Adoor Gopalakrishnan – Nominated

1973 National Film Awards (India)

- National Film Award for Best Feature Film
- National Film Award for Best Director: Adoor Gopalakrishnan
- National Film Award for Best Actress: Sharada
- National Film Award for Best Cinematography: Mankada Ravi Varma

1973 Kerala State Film Awards (India)

- Kerala State Film Award for Best Photography (Black-and-white): Mankada Ravi Varma
- Kerala State Film Award for Best Art Direction: Devadathan

== Bibliography ==
- Jayaram, S. B. (1996). Adoor Gopalakrishnan: 25 years of film making. Chalachithram. OCLC 47954603.
- Bhaskaran, Gautaman (2010). Adoor Gopalakrishnan: A Life in Cinema. Delhi: Penguin Books. ISBN 978-0-670-08171-4.
- NFDC (1991). Cinema in India, Volume 2. Delhi: National Film Development Corporation of India.
- Thoraval, Yves (2002). The Cinemas of India (1896–2000). Delhi: Macmillan India. ISBN 0-333-93410-5.
- Rajadhyaksha, Ashish; Willemen, Paul (1999). Encyclopaedia of Indian cinema. Oxford University Press. ISBN 0-85170-455-7.
- Datta, Amaresh (2006). "Cinema Malayalam". The Encyclopaedia Of Indian Literature. Sahitya Akademi. ISBN 978-81-260-1803-1.
- Hakemulder, Jan R.; de Jonge, Fay A. C.; Singh, Prabhash P. (1998). Future of journalism, mass communication and public relations. Anmol Publications. ISBN 978-81-261-0067-5. OCLC 46886511.
- Dharap, B. V. (1973). Indian films. National Film Archive of India. ISSN 0377-7359. OCLC 692141264.
- Gopalakrishnan, Adoor (2001). "Of Life...On Films...:Adoor on Swayamvaram" (Interview). Interviewed by C. S. Venkiteswaran (Oct 2001 – Jan 2002 ed.). Deep Focus.
- Vijayakrishnan (1987). Malayala Cinemayude Katha. Kerala State Film Development Corporation. ISBN 978-81-8264-070-2.
- Menon, Dhanya (1998). "Malayalam Literary Survey (Journal)". 20 (1–21). Kerala Sahitya Akademi.
- Datta, Sangeeta (2002). Shyam Benegal. British Film Institute. ISBN 978-0-85170-907-9.
