= Bharat Gopy =

Indian actor (1937–2008)

- Born: Gopynathan Velayudhan Nair; 2 November 1937; Chirayinkeezhu, Kingdom of Travancore, British India
- Died: 29 January 2008 (aged 70); Thiruvananthapuram, Kerala, India
- Other name: Kodiyettam Gopy
- Education: University College, Thiruvananthapuram
- Years active: 1972–1986, 1993–2008
- Spouse: Jayalakshmi S. V.
- Children: Murali Gopy; Dr. Minu Gopy
- Parents: Velayudhan Pillai; Parvathyamma
- Awards: Padma Shri; National Film Awards (1); Kerala State Film Awards (6)
- Website: bharatgopy.com

Gopynathan Velayudhan Nair (2 November 1937 – 29 January 2008), popularly known by the stage name Bharat Gopy, was an Indian actor, producer, and director. Considered one of the greatest actors in the history of Indian cinema, Gopy was one of the first actors to be associated with the New Wave cinema movement in Kerala during the 1970s.

Bharat Gopy has won many awards, including the National Film Award for Best Actor for his role as Sankarankutty in Kodiyettam (1977). His well-known roles include Aiyappan in Yavanika, Vasu Menon in Palangal, Prof. "Shakespeare" Krishna Pillai in Kattathe Kilikoodu, Dushasana Kurup in Panchavadi Palam, Nandagopal in Ormakkayi, Mammachan in Adaminte Vaariyellu, Shankaran in Chidambaram, and Krishnan Raju in Aghaat. He won four Kerala State Film Awards for Best Actor for various roles.

As a filmmaker he is known for Ulsavapittennu (1989) and Yamanam (1991). He produced the 1993 film Padheyam directed by Bharathan. In 1991 the Government of India honoured him with the Padma Shri for his contributions towards the arts. In 1994, he authored the book Abhinayam Anubhavam, which won the National Film Award for Best Book on Cinema.

== Early life and family ==
Bharat Gopy was born on 2 November 1937 at Chirayinkeezhu in Thiruvananthapuram District of the state of Kerala as the youngest of four children to Kochuveetil Velayudhan Pillai and Parvathyamma. He completed his BSc. Degree from University College, Thiruvananthapuram. Immediately after his studies, he was employed as Lower Division Clerk in the Kerala Electricity Board.

He is married to Jayalakshmy S. V. The couple has a son, writer-actor Murali Gopy, and a daughter, Dr. Minu Gopy.

== Career ==
=== Stage actor ===
Gopy began his acting career as a theatre actor at Prasadhana Little Theatres under G. Sankara Pillai. His first stage appearance was in the role of Raaghavan in the play Abhayarthikal. Later on, he became associated with Thiruvarange under Kaavalam Narayana Panicker. He has also written five plays and directed three.

=== Film actor ===
Gopy became interested in cinema through the Chitralekha Film Society, founded by Adoor Gopalakrishnan. He made his movie debut in Adoor's Swayamvaram in 1972 in a small role. He did the lead role of Sankarankutty in Adoor's next film, Kodiyettam (1977), a performance for which he won the National Award for Best Actor. He was also noted for his performances in movies like Ormakkayi, Yavanika, Panchavadi Palam and Adaminte Vaariyellu. Besides Malayalam movies, he acted in two Hindi movies, Aaghat and Satah Se Uthata Aadmi. Gopy was a film director and producer as well. Gopy was paralysed by a stroke on 20 February 1986, at the zenith of his career.

He was awarded the Padma Shri in 1991.

In 1979, Gopy directed the movie Njattadi with Murali in lead role. The movie was only screened twice and the print is now lost. He directed three more movies Ulsavapittennu, Yamanam and Ente Hridhayathinte Utama. His Yamanam, about a physically disabled person, was awarded Best Film on social issues by the National Award Jury in 1991.

On 24 January 2008, Gopy was hospitalised with chest pain. He died five days later following a cardiac arrest. His last role was in Balachandra Menon's De Ingottu Nokkiye (2008).

=== Author ===
Gopy authored two books. His book Abhinayam Anubhavam (Acting, Experience), won the National Film Award for Best Book on Cinema in 1994. In 2003, Nataka Niyogam, his book on drama won the Kerala State Drama Awards for Best Book on Drama.

== Filmography ==
=== Actor ===
Year	Title	Role	Notes
1972	Swayamvaram	an unemployed youth	
1977	Kodiyettam	Sankarankutty	National Film Award for Best Actor; Kerala State Film Award for Best Actor
1978	Thampu	Panicker, the circus manager	
1979	Peruvazhiyambalam	Vishwambharan, the tea shop owner	
1980	Satah Se Uthata Aadmi	Ramesh	Screened in the Un Certain Regard section at the 1981 Cannes Film Festival
1980	Greeshmam		
1981	Vida Parayum Munpe	Dr. Thomas	
1981	Palangal	Vasu Menon	
1981	Kallan Pavithran	Maamachan	
1982	Yavanika	Tabalist Ayyappan	
1982	Ormakkayi	Nandu, the deaf and dumb sculptor	Kerala State Film Award for Best Actor (1982)
1982	Snehapoorvam Meera	Abraham	
1982	Gaanam		
1982	Aalolam	Mukundan Menon	
1982	Marmaram	Naxalite Gopy	
1983	Rachana	Sriprasad	Kerala State Film Award for Best Actor (1983)
1983	Purappadu		
1983	Asthi	Mohan	
1983	Nizhal Moodiya Nirangal	Unni	
1983	Lekhayude Maranam Oru Flashback	Suresh Babu	
1983	Kattathe Kilikoodu	Shakespeare Krishna Pillai	Kerala State Film Award for Best Actor (1983)
1983	Oru Swakaryam	Kaimal	
1983	Ente Mamattikkuttiyammakku	Vinod	Kerala State Film Award for Best Actor (1983)
1983	Ashtapadi		
1983	Asthram	Capt. C. S. Nair	
1983	Eenam	Kaimal	
1983	Eettillam	Moitheen Bawa	
1984	Adaminte Variyellu	Mamachan Muthalaly	
1984	Sandhya Mayangum Neram	Justice Balagangadhara Menon	
1984	Panchavadi Palam	Dushassana Kurup	
1984	Swantham Sarika	Basheer	
1984	Appunni	Perattupadaveettil Ayyappan Nair	
1984	Akkare	K. N. Gopynathan	
1984	Aarorumariyathe	Stephan George	
1984	Aksharangal	VP Menon	
1984	April 18	Constable Gopy Pillai	
1984	Oru Painkilikatha	Swami	
1985	Punnaram Cholli Cholli	Krishnankutty Nair	
1985	Kayyum Thalayum Purathidaruthu		
1985	Chidambaram	Mohandas	Kerala State Film Award for Best Actor (1985)
1985	Gaayathridevi Ente Amma	Mahadevan Thampi	
1985	Aghaat	Krishnan Raju	Hindi film
1985	Principal Olivil	Vasavan Pillai	
1985	Onathumbikkoru Oonjaal	Augustine	
1985	Archana Aradhana	Advocate Rajendran	
1985	Kanathaya Penkutty	Devadas Menon	
1985	Karimpinpoovinakkare	Chellan	
1985	Scene No 7	Menon	
1985	Puli Varunne Puli	Chairman	
1985	Ente Ammu Ninte Thulasi Avarude Chakki	Chellappan Pillai	
1985	Irakal	Bishop	
1986	Nilavinte nattil	Balachandra Panikkar	
1986	Meenamasathile Sooryan	EK Nayanar	
1986	Chekkeranoru Chilla		
1986	Revathikkoru Pavakkutty	Balan Menon	
1986	Udayam Padinjaru	Thampi	
1986	Neram Pularumbol	Nancy's Father	
1986	Ice Cream	Panikkar	
1993	Padheyam	K. V. Raghavan	
1994	Swaham		Screened at the 1994 Cannes Film Festival
1994	Vardhakya Puranam	Rama Pothuval	
1995	Agnidevan	K. K. Menon	
1995	Ormakalundayirikkanam	Thakaran	
1998	Elavamkodu Desam	Agnisarmman	
1998	Samaantharangal	Musaliyar	
1998	Kaikudunna Nilavu	Devi's Grandfather	
1999	Vasanthiyum Lakshmiyum Pinne Njaanum		
1999	Devadasi	Shanta Ram	
2000	Susanna	K P Govardhanan Pilla	
2001	Ennum Sambhavami Yuge Yuge		
2001	Mookkuthy		
2001	Namukoru Koodaram		
2002	Desam	Uppa	
2003	Varum Varunnu Vannu	Kathanar	
2004	Sethurama Iyer CBI	Fr. Gomez	
2004	Wanted	Anu's Father	
2006	Rasathanthram	Balan Master	
2007	Nivedyam	Ramavarma Thampuran	
2007	Paradesi		
2007	Nasrani	Narayana Swamy	
2008	Aakasha Gopuram	Abraham Thomas	Posthumous film
2008	De Ingottu Nokkiye	Bhuminadha Kurup	Posthumous film
2009	Bharya Swantham Suhruthu		Posthumous film

=== Director ===
Year	Title	Notes
1979	Njattadi	
1989	Ulsavapittennu	
1991	Yamanam	Best Film on Other Social Issues
2002	Ente Hridayathinte Udama	

=== Producer ===
Year	Title	Notes
1993	Padheyam	V. Shantaram award for the producer of the Best film

== Awards ==
=== International awards and honours ===
- Special Jury Award at the Asia Pacific International Film Festival, Tokyo (1985)
- A five-film retrospective of his films was held in Paris by the Government of France (1985). The only other Indian actors to be awarded this honour are Smita Patil, Naseeruddin Shah, Om Puri, Rajesh Khanna and Amitabh Bachchan

=== Civilian awards ===
- Padma Shri – 1991

=== National Film Awards ===
- Best Actor – Kodiyettam – 1977
- Best Film on Other Social Issues – Yamanam – 1991
- Best Book on Cinema – Abhinayam Anubhavam – 1995

=== V. Shantaram Award ===
- Best Film Award – Padheyam – 1993 (as producer)

=== Kerala State Film Awards ===
- Best Actor – Kodiyettam – 1977
- Best Actor – Ormakkayi – 1982
- Best Actor – Ente Mamattikkuttiyammakku, Eenam, Ettillam, Kattathe Kilikoodu – 1983
- Best Actor – Chidambaram – 1985

=== Filmfare Awards ===
- 1982 – Best Actor – Ormakkayi
- 1983 - Best Actor - Kattathe Kilikkoodu

=== Other awards ===
- 1994 – Kerala Sangeetha Nataka Akademi Fellowship
- Four critics awards
- Two Gulf Malayali association awards
