= Aval (1967 film) =

- Directed by: P. M. A. Azeez
- Written by: Thoppil Bhasi
- Produced by: Muhammad Sarkar
- Starring: Madhu; K. P. Ummer; Adoor Bhasi; Kaduvakulam Antony; Kedamangalam Ali; Krishnankutty; Maya; Meenakumari; Kozhikode Santha Devi; Ushanandini
- Cinematography: Mankada Ravi Varma
- Edited by: K. D. George
- Music by: Devarajan
- Production company: Beena Films
- Release date: 30 June 1967
- Running time: 142 min
- Country: India
- Language: Malayalam

Aval (English: She) is a 1967 Malayalam film directed by P. M. A. Azeez with Madhu, K. P. Ummer, Adoor Bhasi, Kaduvakulam Antony, Kedamangalam Ali, Krishnankutty, Maya, Meenakumari, Kozhikode Santha Devi and Ushanandini in the star cast. The film is about sexual impotence, divorce and a social system riddled with incestuous relationships. It was the first Malayalam film to be directed by a Film Institute graduate. It also marked the debut of cinematographer Mankada Ravi Varma.

== Cast ==
- Madhu
- Adoor Bhasi
- Maya
- K. P. Ummer
- Kaduvakulam Antony
- Kedamangalam Ali
- Meena
- Santha Devi
- Ushanandini
- Krishnankutty

== Soundtrack ==
The music was composed by G. Devarajan and the lyrics were written by Vayalar Ramavarma.

No.	Song	Singers	Lyrics	Length (m:ss)
1	"Aariyankaaviloraattidayan"	S. Janaki	Vayalar Ramavarma	
2	"Innallo Kaamadevanu"	S. Janaki, P. Susheela	Vayalar Ramavarma	
3	"Karakaanaakkayalile"	Zero Babu	Vayalar Ramavarma	
4	"Mrinaalini"	K. J. Yesudas	Vayalar Ramavarma	
5	"Premakavithakale"	P. Susheela	Vayalar Ramavarma	
