= Kerala State Film Award for Best Actor =

Annual Indian film award

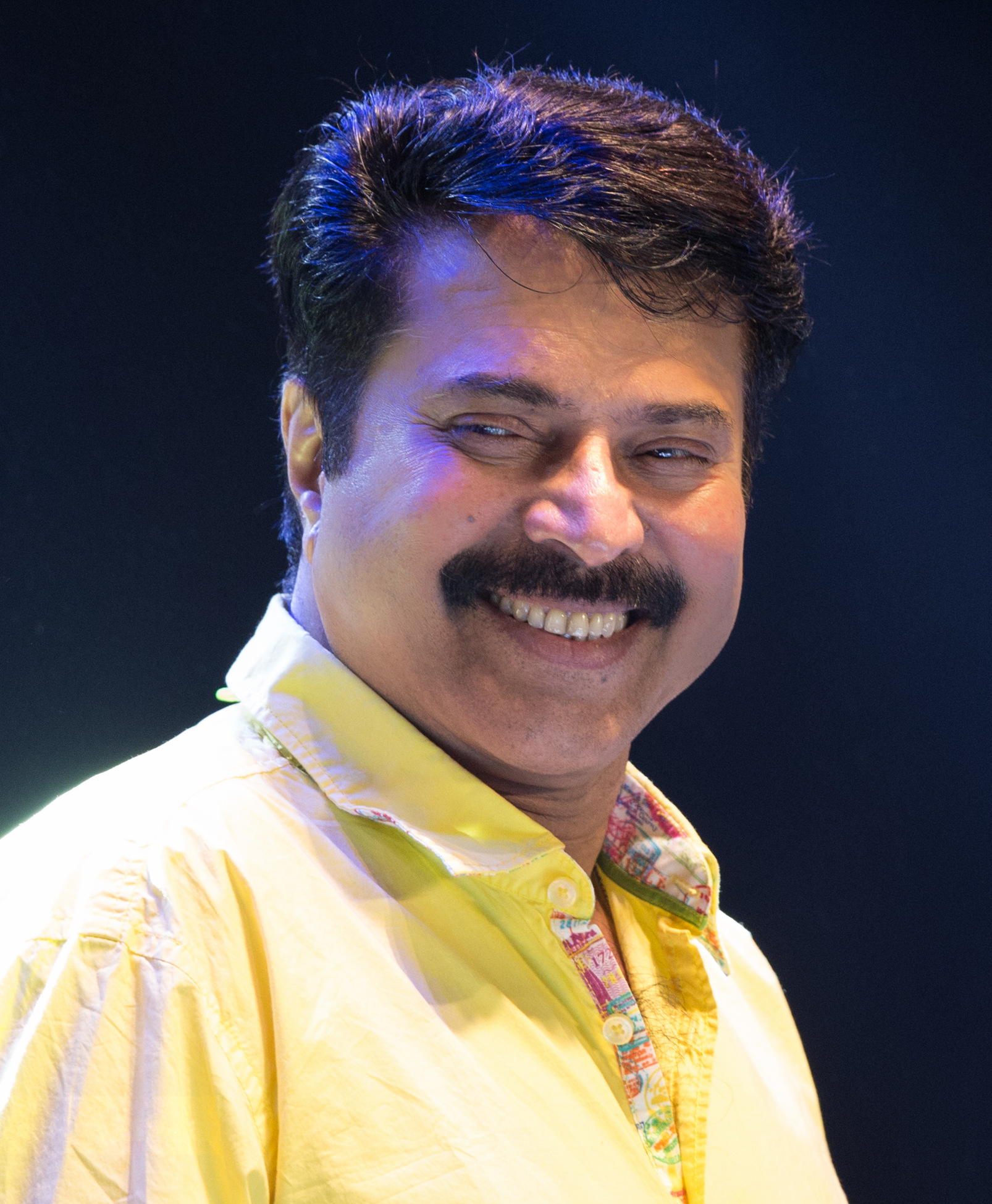
- Mammootty is the recent winner in 2025
- Awarded for: Best performance by an actor in a Malayalam film
- Sponsored by: Kerala State Chalachitra Academy
- Reward: ₹100,000 (US$1,100)
- First award: 1969
- Final award: 2025
- Most recent winner: Mammootty

Highlights
- Most awards: Mammootty (7)
- Total awarded: 55
- First winner: Sathyan
- Website: keralafilm.com

The Kerala State Film Award for Best Actor is an award, begun in 1969, presented annually at the Kerala State Film Awards of India to an actor for best performance in a Malayalam film. Until 1997, the awards were managed directly by the Department of Cultural Affairs of the Government of Kerala. Since 1998, the awards have been organized by the Kerala State Chalachitra Academy, an autonomous, non-profit institution functioning under the Department of Cultural Affairs. The awardees are decided by a jury constituted every year. They are announced by the Minister for Cultural Affairs and are presented by the Chief Minister.

Throughout the years, accounting for ties and repeat winners, the government has presented 55 Best Actor awards to 35 actors. The recipients receive a figurine, a certificate, and a cash prize of ₹100,000 (US$1,100). Several actors have won the honour for more than one film in a given year. As of 2020, Bharat Gopy the only actor to have won the prize in consecutive years (1982 and 1983.

The first Kerala State film Awards ceremony was held in 1970 with Sathyan receiving the award for Kadalpalam (1969). As of 2025, Mammootty is the most honoured actor with seven awards. Mohanlal has won the award six times. Actors Bharat Gopy and Murali have won the award four times. Prithviraj Sukumaran is the youngest recipient at age 24 for Vaasthavam (2006). (Note: In 1986, Mohanlal received the award for T. P. Balagopalan M. A. at age 26.) There were five years when there was a tie for the winner—Rajit Kapur and Murali shared the honour in 1998, Fahadh Faasil and Lal in 2013, Nivin Pauly and Sudev Nair in 2014, Jayasurya and Soubin Shahir in 2018, and Biju Menon and Joju George in 2021. Mammootty is the most recent recipient, who won the award for Bramayugam for the film year 2024, with the announcement/award ceremony taking place in late 2025.

== Winners ==
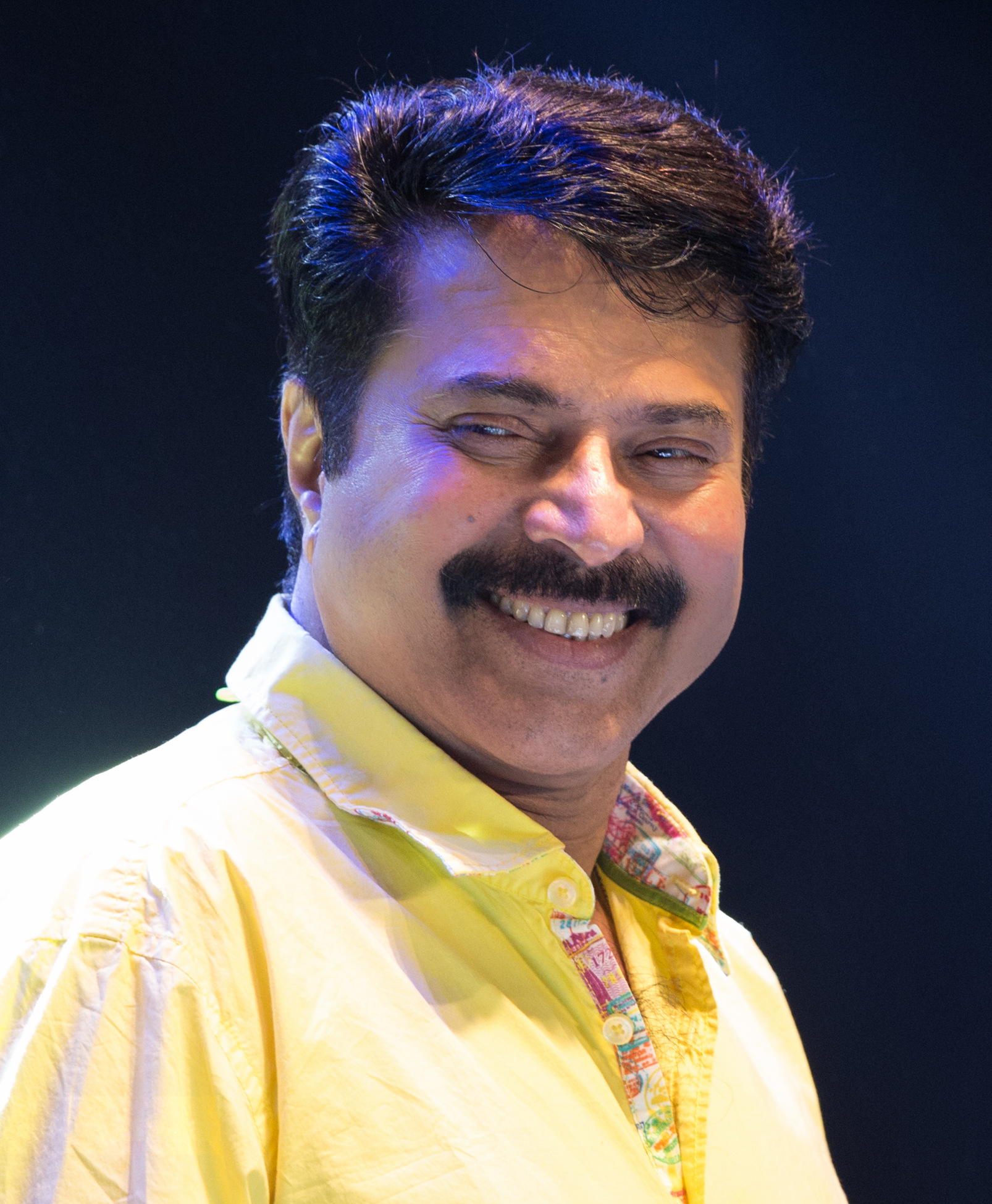
Mammootty is the most frequent winner with seven awards. He is also the most recent winner in 2025.

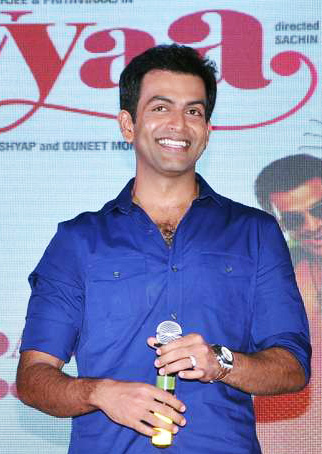
Prithviraj Sukumaran is the youngest recipient of the award (at age 24), for his role in Vaasthavam (2006).

†	Indicates a joint award for that year

Year	Image	Recipient(s)	Film(s)	Ref.
1969		Sathyan	Kadalpalam	
1970		Kottarakkara Sreedharan Nair	Aranazhika Neram	
1971		Sathyan	Karakanakadal	
1972		Thikkurissy Sukumaran Nair	Maaya	
1973		P. J. Antony	Nirmalyam	
1974		Adoor Bhasi	Chattakari	
1975		Sudheer	Sathyathinte Nizhalil	
1976		M. G. Soman	Thanal; Pallavi	
1977		Bharat Gopy	Kodiyettam	
1978		Sukumaran	Bandhanam	
1979		Adoor Bhasi	Cheriyachante Kroorakrithyangal	
1980		Achankunju	Lorry	
1981		Nedumudi Venu	Various	
1982		Bharat Gopy	Ormakkayi	
1983		Bharat Gopy	Ente Mamattukkuttiyammakku; Rachana; Kattathe Kilikkoodu; Eenam	
1984		Mammootty	Adiyozhukkukal	
1985		Bharat Gopy	Chidambaram	
1986		Mohanlal	T. P. Balagopalan M. A.	
1987		Nedumudi Venu	Oru Minnaminunginte Nurunguvettam	
1988		Premji	Piravi	
1989		Mammootty	Oru Vadakkan Veeragatha; Mrigaya; Mahayanam	
1990		Thilakan	Perumthachan	
1991		Mohanlal	Abhimanyu; Ulladakkam; Kilukkam	
1992		Murali	Aadhaaram	
1993		Mammootty	Vidheyan; Ponthan Mada; Vatsalyam	
1994		Thilakan	Gamanam; Santhanagopalam	
1995		Mohanlal	Spadikam; Kaalapani	
1996		Murali	Kaanaakkinaavu	
1997		Suresh Gopi	Kaliyattam	
1998 †		Murali	Thalolam	
1998 †		Rajit Kapur	Agnisakshi	
1999		Mohanlal	Vanaprastham	
2000		O. Madhavan	Sayahnam	
2001		Murali	Neythukaran	
2002		Oduvil Unnikrishnan	Nizhalkuthu	
2003		Nedumudi Venu	Margam	
2004		Mammootty	Kaazhcha	
2005		Mohanlal	Thanmathra	
2006		Prithviraj Sukumaran	Vaasthavam	
2007		Mohanlal	Paradesi	
2008		Lal	Thalappavu	
2009		Mammootty	Paleri Manikyam: Oru Pathirakolapathakathinte Katha	
2010		Salim Kumar	Adaminte Makan Abu	
2011		Dileep	Vellaripravinte Changathi	
2012		Prithviraj Sukumaran	Celluloid; Ayalum Njanum Thammil	
2013 †		Fahadh Faasil	Artist; North 24 Kaatham	
2013 †		Lal	Ayaal; Zachariayude Garbhinikal	
2014 †		Nivin Pauly	1983	
2014 †		Sudev Nair	My Life Partner	
2015		Dulquer Salmaan	Charlie	
2016		Vinayakan	Kammatipaadam	
2017		Indrans	Aalorukkam	
2018 †		Soubin Shahir	Sudani from Nigeria	
2018 †		Jayasurya	Captain; Njan Marykutty	
2019		Suraj Venjaramoodu	Android Kunjappan Version 5.25; Vikruthi	
2020		Jayasurya	Vellam	
2021 †		Biju Menon	Aarkkariyam	
2021 †		Joju George	Nayattu; Madhuram; Thuramukham; Freedom Fight	
2022		Mammootty	Nanpakal Nerathu Mayakkam	
2023		Prithviraj Sukumaran	Aadujeevitham	
2024		Mammootty	Bramayugam	
