= Patheyam =

- Poster
- Directed by: Bharathan
- Written by: Lohithadas
- Produced by: Bharath Gopi; G. Jayakumar
- Starring: Mammootty; Chippy
- Cinematography: Madhu Ambat
- Edited by: B. Lenin; V. T. Vijayan
- Music by: Bombay Ravi
- Production company: Minugopi Moviearts
- Release date: 22 November 1993
- Country: India
- Language: Malayalam

Patheyam (transl. Food for the Journey) is a 1993 Indian Malayalam-language drama film directed by Bharathan, based on a screenplay by A. K. Lohithadas. The film stars Mammootty and Chippy in lead roles, along with Nedumudi Venu, Sasikala, Bharat Gopy and Oduvil Unnikrishnan in supporting roles. The film revolves around Chandradas, a writer of repute, who comes across Haritha Menon, his daughter after a lapse of 15 years, at a school function in Kodaikanal.

The film was Bharat Gopy's first outing as a producer for a mainstream commercial production. He produced the film under the banner of Minugopi Moviearts. The film was shot extensively in and around Kodaikanal. The film features original songs that was composed by Bombay Ravi, while the lyrics were written by Kaithapram Damodaran Namboothiri. The cinematography of the film was done by Madhu Ambat, while the editing was done by B. Lenin and V. T. Vijayan. The art direction of the film was done by Bharathan himself.

Patheyam was released in theatres on November 22, 1993 to critical acclaim. The film was a huge success at the box-office. The film's soundtrack was met with widespread critical acclaim and is regarded as one of the best in Malayalam cinema. The film won the V. Shantaram Gold Award for the Best film of 1994. K. J. Yesudas won the Kerala State Film Award for Best Singer for the film song Chandrakaantham Kondu. The film also introduced the audience to Chippy, who would go on to become one of the leading actresses of the Kannada film industry.

== Plot ==
Chandradas, a famous and best-selling poet and author arrives in Kodaikanal to attend a school felicitation ceremony. There he meets Harita, a brilliant student who directs and performs the lead in a group dance skit based on one of his poems.

Chandradas is intrigued by the originality and brilliance of the performance and tries to find more about Harita. After a meeting with her, he realizes she is his own daughter, conceived after he raped her mother 15 years earlier. He tries to contact her again but is hindered in his efforts by the strict rules of her school. He arranges a meeting with her through one of her favorite teachers and reveals the truth to her.

Harita is initially shattered by the news of hearing that the person who she thought of as her father is not actually her biological father. However, she gradually comes to terms with her new identity and goes away and spends some time with Chandradas. Haritha's grandfather, Govinda Menon, arrives to pick her up after her exams and is taken aback when the school principal tells him she is missing. They inform her parents and they come and pick her up once she returns after her trip.

Chandradas comes to her parents' house to request them to send Haritha with him for a few days to his ancestral house, but Haritha's grandfather treats him badly and asks him to leave. Chandradas resorts to legal recourse to claim his rights over his daughter. At the end of the arguments, when the court asks Haritha who she wants to spend time with while the matter is being adjudged, Haritha picks Chandradas, shattering her family.

Chandradas and his brother take Haritha to their ancestral home where she spends a few days happily with them. However, as the days pass on, she is haunted by the memories of the family she left behind and the happy times she spent with them - especially by the thoughts of the love and kindness showered on her by her step-father.

After spending a last, idyllic day with his daughter where she cooks for him and his brother and they spend some happy and memorable time together, Chandradas takes her back to her parents on his way back to Kolkata. He tells Harikumara Menon, her stepfather that "Her love for you is 1000 times stronger than her love for me". He tells them the memories he has had in the past few days that he spent with her daughter would be enough for him for the rest of his life. After returning her daughter to where her heart belongs, Chandradas walks off to the waiting car to return to Kolkata, back to his old life and Harita watches him leave, tears in her eyes.

== Cast ==
- Mammootty as Chandradas
- Chippy as Haritha Menon
- Nedumudi Venu as Kunjikannan Nair
- Sasikala as Anitha
- Premachandran as Brother of Chandradas.
- Lalu Alex as Harikumara Menon
- Chithra as Padmini
- Bharath Gopi as K. V. Raghavan
- Oduvil Unnikrishnan as Keezhseri Nampoothiri
- Kozhikode Narayanan Nair as Mangalasseri Govinda Menon

== Soundtrack ==
The soundtrack for the movie was composed by Bombay Ravi with lyrics by Kaithapram Damodaran Namboothiri. The film's songs were all chartbusters and were critically acclaimed. K. J. Yesudas won the 1993 Kerala State Film Award for Best Singer for the song Chandrakaantham Kondu.

#	Title	Singer(s)
1	"Andhakaaram"	K. J. Yesudas
2	"Chandrakaantham Kondu"	K. J. Yesudas
3	"Chandrakaantham Kondu" (F)	K. S. Chitra
4	"Ganapathibhagavaan"	K. J. Yesudas
5	"Jwalamukikal"	K. J. Yesudas
6	"Prapancham"	K. J. Yesudas
7	"Raasanilavinu"	K. J. Yesudas, K. S. Chitra

== Reception ==
In an original review of the film, The Hindu writes: " Lohitadas, on whose story and script the film is based, tends to elaborate rather than elucidate. It takes a profound insight into human psyche and political ethos to mold a true revolutionary, be he an extremist or not. In the case of Chandradas, he relies on verbosity and revels in platitudes. It may sound poetic, but there is a tinge of pedantic pretense when he declares that he has been wandering about like a wounded bird. The screenplay, nevertheless, has its moments of emotional conflict and confrontation involving all the major protagonists." Further writes: "The start of the film could have been crisper with some pruning of the introductory scenes, however picturesque they are. The encounter between the blunt and bitter K.V.R and the mellowed Chandradas, his former disciple is evocative. Though not the dance-drama, it is Haritha's performance in it that is so scintillating as to catch Chandradas' unawares, and the audience as well. Pining for each other, the anguish of the father and the daughter, and the latter's hapless plight cloistered as she is within the hostel are narrated with conviction. Set in far-off Culcutta, the flashback featuring the younger Chandradas and Anita and their amorous meeting on the fateful night are driven home in shot but sharp touches. Bharathan's slair to romanticize is fairly evident in the father-daughter joint sojourn." Regarding the performances they write: "Appearing as Chandradas, Mammootty strives to act natural with a fair degree of success. But he looks ill at ease with his beard on. So much acting potential does newcomer Chippi evince in the role of Haritha that she is sure to go places. Sasikala is alluring as Anita while Lalu Alex attracts some somber acting as Harikumaran. Nedumudi Venu is quite at home as K. K. Nair, while Oduvil Unnikrishnan scores as Thirumeni, his Jeeves-like manager. Gopi's portrayal of the fireband K.V.R has the feel and heat of old ambers burning still." About the music of the film The Hindu writes: " Kaithaprom's lyrics are tuned to pleasing music by Ravi Bombay. Madhu Ambrat's marvellous camera paints haunting hues almost throughout. All said and done, Patheyam is a welcome relief at a time when butchery is glorified in film after film."

Neelima Menon of The News Minute criticizes the film's treatment of women, writing: "In Bharathan's Patheyam (1993, written by Lohitadas), the hero (Mammootty) molests his friend's fiancée who is there for a night of shelter and benevolently offers to marry her. After apologising to her, he wonders why she didn't slap him to which she says “his touch made her forget everything. I became a mere woman and I blame myself for that.” Though he suggests forgetting this lapse and moving on, she is consumed by the guilt of "cheating" her fiancé and agrees to the marriage."

== Awards ==
The film won the following awards:

#	Award	Nominee	Result
1	V. Shantaram Award for Best Film (1993)	Bharath Gopi and Bharathan	Won
2	Kerala State Film Award for Best Singer (1993)	K. J. Yesudas for Chandrakaantham Kondu	Won
