= Nokkukuthi =

- Directed by: Mankada Ravi Varma
- Written by: M. Govindan
- Screenplay by: M. Govindan
- Produced by: P. P. Kunjahammad
- Starring: Ajitha Gopalakrishnan; K. V. Haridas; Sameera; Sethu
- Cinematography: Mankada Ravi Varma
- Edited by: Ramesh
- Release date: 31 December 1983
- Country: India
- Language: Malayalam

Nokkukuthi is a 1983 Indian Malayalam film, directed by Mankada Ravi Varma and produced by P. P. Kunjahammad. The film stars Ajitha Gopalakrishnan, K. V. Haridas, Sameera and Sethu in lead roles.The film won a Special Jury Award at the national level and the Kerala State Film Award for Best Cinematography.

== Cast ==
- Ajitha Gopalakrishnan
- K. V. Haridas
- Sethu
- Kadammanitta Ramakrishnan
