= Psycho Mohammed =

Psychologist

Psycho Mohamed
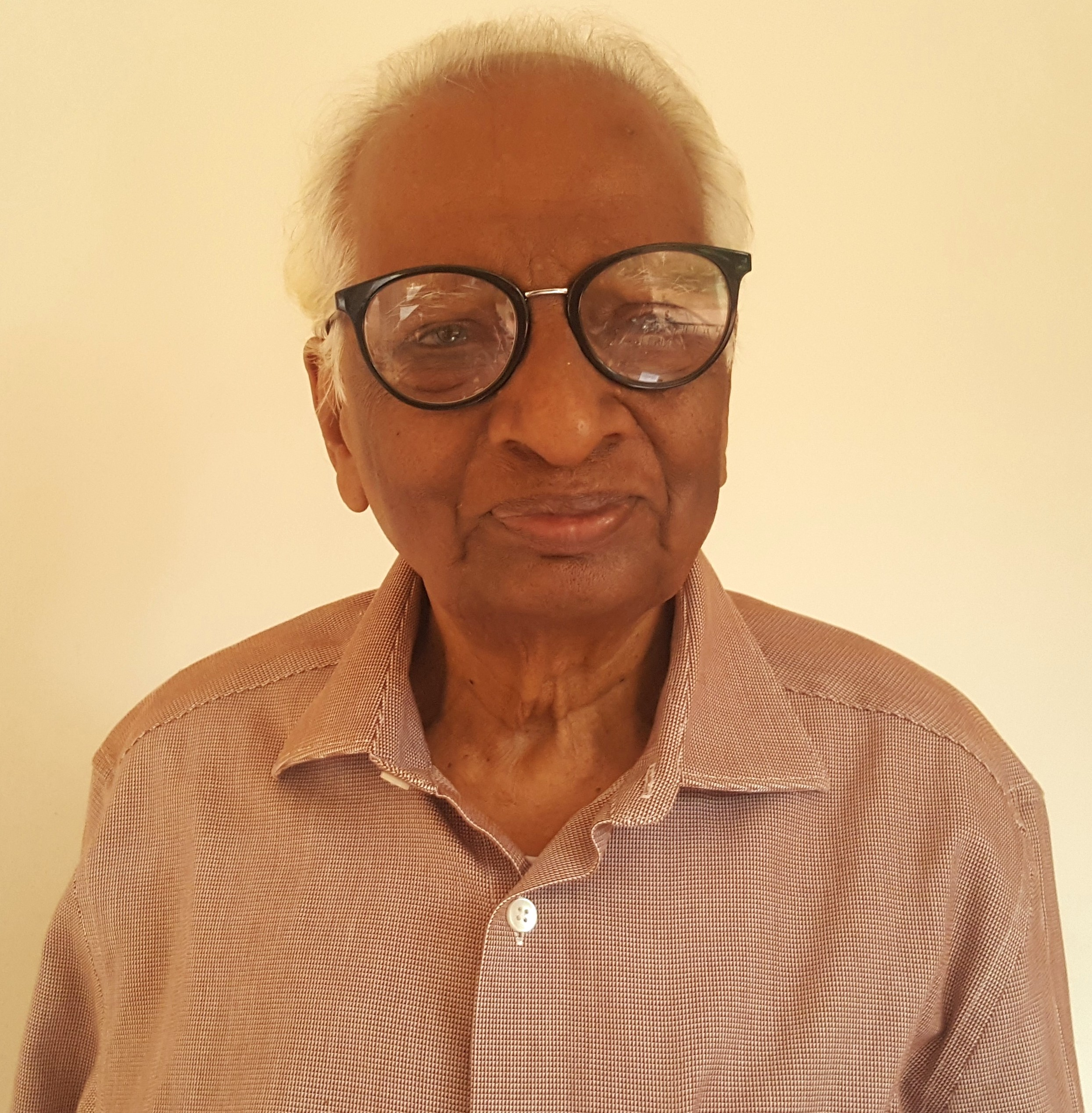
- Psycho Mohamed in 2021
- Born: Eledath Mohamed; 1935 (age 90–91)
- Occupations: Clinical Psychologist and social scientist
- Spouse: Kadeeja V.K
- Children: 3

‘Psycho or Siko’ is the pen name of Prof. Eledath Mohamed who is a well known Clinical Psychologist from Kerala, India. He is one of the founding members of Indian Association of Clinical Psychologists (IACP) and was the national president of IACP from 2000 to 2003. He is the first clinical psychologist hailing from Kerala. He is also the first psychologist (1960) to start a weekly column ‘Your Psychological Problems’ in Malayalam in the prestigious newspaper Mathrubhumi. The weekly column was published from 1960 to 1975. He has published about 20 research papers, including in British Journal of Psychiatry and Epilepsia, many of them were presented in international conferences. He is the author of 6 books and several articles and essays in various magazines and newspapers. The topics of his writing pertained to travelogues and psychological subjects. He has appeared and been interviewed by television networks and online news outlets for his psychological expertise. The story for the award-winning (1976 Kerala state and National Film Award for Best Feature Film in Malayalam) Swapnadanam, KG George's first film, was written by Eledath Mohamed.

== Early years ==
Mohamed was born in 1935 in Marancheri, Malappuram district in Kerala, India to Ahmedunni Haji and Mariakutty. His father was an Arabic scholar and a highly respected religious teacher who died when Mohamed was only 3 months old. When his mother remarried, he was looked after by his uncle and maternal grandmother. His great uncle was E. Moidu Moulavi, a freedom fighter from the Eledath family. From ages 10 to 14, he studied in an orphanage. In addition to the regular school classes, he also attended religious classes. During these early years he was exposed to the many literary books where he first got interested in writing and passionately participated in school debates.

== Education ==
He studied in Elementary School, Panampad, Tirurangadi Muslim Orphanage, M.I. High School Ponnani, and Farook College, Calicut.

He obtained his master's degree in psychology from Presidency College, Madras University in 1958. He obtained DM & SP (Diploma in Medical & Social Psychology) from NIMHANS, Bangalore in 1962.

== Professional career ==
- Assistant Research Officer, ICMR Project, NIMHANS, Bangalore, India from 1962 to 1963.
- Clinical Psychologist, Command Hospital, Pune, India from 1963 to 1975.
- Faculty member, Armed Forces Medical College, Pune, India 1963 to 1975.
- Faculty member, Mosul Medical College, Mosul University Iraq 1975 to 1978.
- Faculty member, Al Arab Medical University, Benghazi, Libya 1978 to 1993.
- Director, Ansar Hospital & Allied Medical Institutions, Perumpilavu, Kerala, India from 1994 to 2015.
- Director, Ansar Institute of Mental Health, Perumpilavu, Kerala, India since 2015.

== Honours ==
- Founder member of Indian Association of Clinical Psychologists (IACP).
- National President of IACP (2000 to 2003).
- Member of Expert Group on Clinical Psychology, Rehabilitation Council of India (2000 to 2003).
- Member, Kerala State Mental Health Authority from 2001 to 2004.
- President IACP, Kerala Region 1997.
- Member of WHO Expert Group, Organizing Libya Mental Health Service (1980)
- Founder member of Kerala Sastra Samidi (1963), the parental body of Kerala Sastra Sahithya Parishath.
- Created the story for the National Film Award for Best Feature Film in Malayalam (1976), Swapnadanam .

== Books ==
- Your Children (നിങ്ങളുടെ കുട്ടികൾ), National Book Stall, Kottayam, Kerala, India (1965).
- An IQ Test for You (നിങ്ങൾക്കായി ഒരു ബുദ്ധി പരീക്ഷ), National Book Stall, Kottayam, Kerala, India (1966).
- On The Banks Of Euphrates & Tigris (യൂഫ്രട്ടീസ് ടൈഗ്രിസിന്റെ തീരത്ത്), National Book Stall, Kottayam, Kerala, India (1978).
- Mental Health and Well Being, Chapter in the book ‘Kerala’s Demographic Future, Issues & Policy Options’, Editors: S. Irudaya Rajan & K. C. Zacharia; Academic Foundation, New Delhi (2012).
- In Saddam's Land (സദ്ദാമിന്റെ നാട്ടിൽ), Green Books, Thrissur, Kerala, India (2019).
- Gaddhafi's Libya (ഗദ്ദാഫിയുടെ ലിബിയ), Green Books, Thrissur, Kerala, India (2019).
- A Past Syrian Trip (ഒരു ഭൂതകാല സിറിയന്‍ യാത്ര), Green Books, Thrissur, Kerala, India (2019).

== Research publications ==
Over 20 publications, which include the following:

- Psychosocial Background of Servicemen Contracting Venereal Diseases; International Review of the Army, Navy and Air Force Medical Services (1967).
- One Hundred Cases of Hysteria in Eastern Libya; British Journal of Psychiatry (1986).
- Prevalence, Knowledge, Attitude, and Practice of Epilepsy in Kerala, South India; Epilepsia (2000).
- Migration and Mental Health Survey in all 14 districts of Kerala. Jointly done with Dr. S. Irudaya Rajan, CDS Thiruvananthapuram and Institute of Social Science Trust, New Delhi (2002).
