= Purappadu (1983 film) =

- Directed by: Rajeevnath
- Starring: Nedumudi Venu; Bharath Gopi
- Release date: 1983
- Country: India
- Language: Malayalam

Purappadu is a 1983 Malayalam-language Indian feature film directed by Rajeevnath, starring Nedumudi Venu, Bharath Gopi in lead roles.

== Cast ==
- Nedumudi Venu
- Bharath Gopi
- Kottarakkara Sreedharan Nair
- Sarmila
