= P. K. Venukuttan Nair =

Indian actor (1931–2012)

- Born: 1931; Kerala, India
- Died: 26 November 2012 (aged 81); Thiruvananthapuram, Kerala, India
- Occupation: Actor

P. K. Venukuttan Nair (1931 – 26 November 2012) was an Indian theatre personality and Malayalam film actor. He was the vice-president of the Kerala Sangeetha Nataka Akademi and member of the Kendra Sangeet Natak Academy. He received the Kerala Sangeetha Nataka Akademi Award in 1995 and the Kerala Sangeetha Nataka Akademi Fellowship in 1998. He won many awards at state-level competitions for professional theatre, including the P. J. Antony Award in March 2002.

Nair died on 26 November 2012 following a brief illness in Thiruvananthapuram at the age of 81.

== Filmography ==
- Swayamvaram (One's Own Choice, 1972)
- Mazhakkaaru (1973)
- Oolkatal (Bay, 1978) as Reena's father
- Swapnadanam (Journey Through a Dream, 1976) as Sumitra's father
- Ammaayi Amma (1977)
- Poojakkedukkaatha Pookkal (1977) as P. N. Pilla
- Kodiyettam (1978)
- Ulkadal (1979)
- Simhaasanam (1979)
- Kannukal (1979) .... Keshavan Nair
- Daaliyappookkal (1980)
- Poochasanyaasi (1981)
- Aambalppoovu (1981)
- Gaanam (1982)
- Oru Cheru Punchiri (A Slender Smile, 2000) as Govindettan
