= Swapnadanam =

- Poster
- Directed by: K. G. George
- Written by: K. G. George; Pamman
- Story by: Psycho Mohammed
- Produced by: T. Mohammed Bapu
- Starring: Rani Chandra; Dr. Mohandas; M. G. Soman; Mallika Sukumaran; P. K. Venukuttan Nair; Prema Menon; T. R. Omana
- Cinematography: Ramachandra Babu
- Edited by: Editor Ravi (K.P Ravindran)
- Music by: Bhaskar Chandavarkar
- Production company: Kerala Film Chamber of Commerce
- Release date: 12 March 1976
- Country: India
- Language: Malayalam

Swapnadanam (English: Journey Through a Dream) is a 1976 black-and-white Malayalam-language film and K. G. George's directorial debut. It won the Kerala State Film Award for Best Film and National Film Award for Best Feature Film in Malayalam. The cast includes Rani Chandra, Dr. Mohandas, Soman, Mallika and P. K. Venukuttan Nair.

== Synopsis ==
Dr. Gopi is a successful doctor whose marriage to Sumitra is troubled by his emotional detachment and inability to connect with her. Unknown to his wife, Gopi is deeply affected by a past romantic relationship that ended before his marriage. Struggling with guilt, regret, and unresolved feelings, he develops a dissociative condition and begins assuming the identity of another man named Parameswaran. His unusual behavior leaves Sumitra confused and worried as she tries to understand what is happening to her husband.

As Gopi's condition worsens, a team of doctors investigates the cause of his mental distress through psychological examination and psychoanalysis. Their efforts gradually uncover memories and emotions hidden in his subconscious. The investigation reveals that Gopi's inner conflict stems from personal sacrifices he made in order to build a successful career and enter a socially acceptable marriage, while never fully overcoming the loss of his former love.

The truth behind Gopi's alternate identity eventually comes to light. The doctors realize that Parameswaran was an unconscious escape from the emotional pain that Gopi could not face in his everyday life. The film explores the effects of suppressed emotions, unresolved grief, and an unhappy marriage, portraying how psychological distress can divide a person's sense of self. In the end, Gopi's condition is understood as a desperate attempt to avoid confronting his past and accepting his present reality.

== Cast ==
- Rani Chandra as Sumithra
- Dr. Mohandas as Gopi/Parameshwaran
- M. G. Soman as Mohan
- Mallika Sukumaran as Rosi Cheriyan
- T. R. Omana as Gopi's mother
- P. K. Venukuttan Nair as Sumithra's father
- Prema Menon as Kalyani
- Sonia Isaac Thomas as Kamalam
- P. K. Abraham as psychiatrist Venugopal
- Isaac Thomas as a psychiatrist
- Anandavalli
- KPAC Azeez

== Soundtrack ==
The music was composed by Bhaskar Chandavarkar and the lyrics were written by P. J. Eezhakkadavu.

No.	Song	Singers	Lyrics	Length (m:ss)
1	"Kanneerkkadalil"	P. B. Sreenivas	P. J. Eezhakkadavu	
2	"Pandu Pandoru"	P. Susheela	P. J. Eezhakkadavu	
3	"Swarga Gopura Vaathil"	S. Janaki	P. J. Eezhakkadavu	
4	"Vedana Ninnu Vithumbunna"	K. P. Brahmanandan	P. J. Eezhakkadavu	

== Reception ==
A critic from Free India praised the acting of Rani Chandra but found Mohandas as adequate.
