= Gajanan Madhav Muktibodh =

Indian writer (1917–1964)

- Born: 13 November 1917; Sheopur, Central Provinces (present-day Chambal, Madhya Pradesh)
- Died: 11 September 1964 (aged 46); New Delhi, India
- Occupations: Writer, poet, essayist, literary critic, political critic

Gajanan Madhav Muktibodh (13 November 1917 – 11 September 1964) was a prominent Hindi poet, essayist, literary and political critic, and fiction writer of the 20th century.

Muktibodh is widely regarded as a pioneer of modern Hindi poetry in India along with Surya Kant Tripathi 'Nirala'. He was a leading figure in the Prayogvaad Experimentalism movement of Hindi literature and of the Nayi Kahani and Nayi Kavita Modernism of the 1950s. He is also considered a central figure in the rise of 'New Criticism' in Indian literature. He was an assistant-editor of several noted Hindi journals including Naya Khun and Vasudha.

Muktibodh was born in Sheopur, Madhya Pradesh. He was one of the seven poets included in the first volume of Tar Saptak, a series of anthologies (1943), which marked a transition in Hindi literature from the prevalent movement in Chhayavaad or Romanticism. The initiation of Prayogvaad or Experimentalism and Pragativaad or Progressivism in Hindi poetry eventually led to the creation of the 'Nayi Kahani' (New Story) movement or Modernism.

Brahmarakshas (ब्रह्मराक्षस) is considered Muktibodh's most influential work in experimental poems, noted for the use of archetypal imagery. The poem is a depiction of the contemporary intellectual, who gets so lost in his own sense of perfectionism, unending calculations, and subjective interpretation of the external reality that he loses touch with reality itself, and eventually dies and fades away like a dead bird.

Muktibodh was deeply influenced by Marxism and Existentialism, and expressed his deep discontent with contemporary society. According to Sanjay K. Gautam, Muktibodh was "the most influential Marxist Hindi poet in postcolonial India, and one of the founders of modernism in Hindi poetry". He continued to show his progressive streak even after the disintegration of the Progressive Writers' Movement after 1953; and, through the rest of his career, he along with writers like Yashpal, continued his ideological fight against modernist and formalist trends in Hindi literature.

He is best known for his long poems:Brahma-rakshasa (ब्रह्मराक्षस), Chand ka Muh Teda hai (The Moon Wears a Crooked Smile) (चाँद का मुहँ टेढ़ा है), Andhere Mein (In the Dark) (अंधेरे में) and Bhuri Bhuri Khak Dhul (The Brown Dry Dust) (भूरी भूरी ख़ाक धूल); his complete works extending to 6 volumes, were published in 1980, as Muktibodh Rachnavali.

Sharadchandra Madhav Muktibodh (1921–1985), a Marathi poet, novelist, and Marxist critic, winner of Sahitya Akademi Award (1979) in Marathi, was the younger brother of Muktibodh

== Works ==
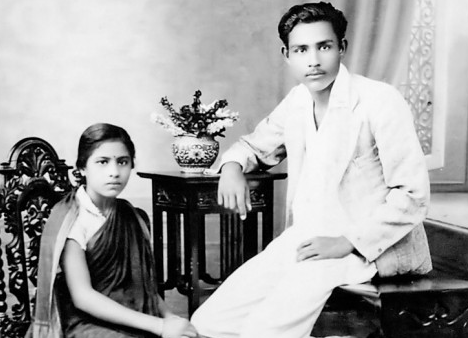
Muktibodh with his wife

His first individual book was published in 1964, when he was on his death-bed: (Chand Ka Muh Teda Hai (चाँद का मुहँ टेढ़ा है). Although Muktibodh could not manage to get his works published, as a book in his lifetime, he was one of the contributing poets to the first three volumes of Tar Saptak, a series of path-breaking poetry anthologies, edited by Ajneya. "Bhoori Bhoori Khak Dhool" is the collection of his remaining poems. His collected works, published as 'Muktibodh Rachnavali" were edited by Nemichand Jain.

He is today considered a bridge between the Progressive movement in Hindi poetry and the Nayi Kavita (Modern poetry) movement.

Muktibodh made a name for himself in the field of criticism as well, with his strong views on the upper caste influence on the disintegration of Bhakti movement in India, which he viewed a lower caste uprising against the hegemony upper caste. In literary criticism, he wrote a critical work on Jaishankar Prasad's Kamayani titled: Kamayani, Ek Punarvichar.

Ek Sahityik ki Diary, first written for his column in the weekly Naya Khun, and later continued in the journal Vasudha (1957–60), offers a glimpse of his literary and socio-political criticism, and insights into his way of thinking, and was first published in 1964. It is most noted for the article, Teesra Kshana (Third Moment), where he shows his preference for the hypothesis of three successive stages in the creative process, of inspiration, impersonalisation and expression, rather than a single moment of inspiration

=== Media ===
(चाँद का मुहँ टेढ़ा है)

नगर के बीचों-बीच
आधी रात--
अंधेरे की काली स्याह
शिलाओं से बनी हुई
भीतों और अहातों के,
काँच-टुकड़े जमे हुए
ऊँचे-ऊँचे कन्धों पर
चांदनी की फैली हुई
सँवलायी झालरें।
कारखाना--
अहाते के उस पार
धूम्र मुख चिमनियों के ऊँचे-ऊँचे
उद्गार--चिह्नाकार--मीनार
मीनारों के बीचों-बीच
चांद का है टेढ़ा मुँह!!

The wind's sari border quivers

bullets pierce empty
nests on the fig-tree
Bald detective of pale moonlight
wander the city streets
penetrating its many secret woes
in multiangular corners...
and further on:
Her lips turn dark
Suspended on
a sculpted torso in a harijan temple
greying thatch-roofs
gnarled banyan roots
misty ghosts of lime-smeared rags
arrested in
blouses, petticoats
tattered bedsheets
The lustful eye of the bald crooked moon...

– Muktibodh

A Hindi feature film, Satah Se Uthata Aadmi (Arising from the Surface), with script and dialogues by him, was directed by veteran film director, Mani Kaul, and shown at Cannes Film Festival in 1981. In 2004, "Brahmarakshas ka Shishya", a dramatization of Muktibodh's story, was presented in New Delhi by Soumyabrata Choudhury.

His novel, Vipatra has also been made into an audio book for the blind.

== Legacy ==
His brilliance was recognized by the literary world after the posthumous publication of Chand Ka Munh Tedha Hai, the first collection of his poems, in the early 1960s. Ever since, the book has run into several editions, and is recognized as a modern classic. In his memory, Madhya Pradesh Sahitya Parishad, has instituted the annual MuktiBodh Puraskar.

In 2004, 'Muktibodh Smarak', a memorial was set up at the 'Triveni Sangrahalaya' in Rajnandgaon in Chhattisgarh, along with fellow poets of Chhattisgarh, Padumlal Punnalal Bakshi and Baldeo Prasad Mishra.

== Bibliography ==
- Chand ka Muh Teda Hai – (Anthology of Poems), 1964, Bharatiya Jnanpith.
- Kath Ka Sapna (Anthology of Short stories), 1967, Bharatiya Jnanpith.
- Satah Se Uthta Admi (Anthology of Short stories), 1971, Bharatiya Jnanpith
- Nayi Kavita ka Atmasangharsh tatha anya Nibandha (Essays), 1964, Visvabharati Prakashan.
- Ek Sahityik ki Diary (Essays), 1964, Bharatiya Jnanpith.
- Vipatra (Novel), 1970, Bharatiya Jnanpith.
- Naye sahitya ka saundarya-shastra, 1971, Radhakrishna Prakashan.
- Kamayani: Ek punarvichar, 1973, Sahitya Bharti.
- Bhuri Bhuri Khak Dhul – (Anthology of Poems), 1980, New Delhi, Rajkamal Publications.
- Muktibodh Rachnavali, Edited by Nemichandra Jain, (Complete Works) 6 Vols., 1980, New Delhi, Rajkamal Publications.
- Samiksha ki samasyain, 1982, New Delhi, Rajkamal Publications.
- Pratinidhi kavitayein, edited by Ashoka Vajapeyi. 1984, Rajkamal Prakashan.
- In the Dark: Andhere Mein, translated by Krishna Baldev Vaid. 2001, Rainbow Publishers. ISBN 81-86962-42-5. (ISBN 81-86962-42-5.).
- Dabre Par Sooraj ka Bimb, 2002, National Book Trust. ISBN 81-237-3880-3.
- Muktibodh Ki Kavitayen (Anthology of Poems), 2004, Sahitya Akademi. ISBN 81-260-0674-9.
