= Ormakkayi =

- Poster
- Directed by: Bharathan
- Written by: Bharathan; John Paul
- Produced by: Innocent; David Kachappilly
- Starring: Madhavi; Bharath Gopi; Adoor Bhasi; Nedumudi Venu; Ramu; Krishnachandran; Kunchan
- Cinematography: Vasanth Kumar
- Edited by: Suresh N P
- Music by: Johnson
- Production company: Pankaj Moviemakers
- Distributed by: Prasad Films
- Release date: 10 October 1982
- Country: India
- Language: Malayalam

Ormakkayi (officially Ormakkyaie) is a 1982 Malayalam drama film directed by Bharathan and written by John Paul. The film stars Madhavi, Bharath Gopi, Adoor Bhasi, Nedumudi Venu, Ramu, Krishnachandran and Kunchan in pivotal roles.

== Plot ==
Susanna is released from jail after five years for the accidental murder of a pop singer. She reflects on the events that led up to the tragic event. Nandu, a deaf and dumb sculptor and Susanna's husband.

== Cast ==
- Bharath Gopi as Nandagopal
- Madhavi as Susanna
- Ramu as Peter
- Innocent as Rappayi
- KPAC Lalitha as Gopi's Sister
- Adoor Bhasi as Fernandes
- Nedumudi Venu as Balu
- Krishnachandran as Krishnan
- Sankaradi as Father
- Baby Anju as Chakki
- Jagannatha Varma as Gopi's Brother-in-Law
- Kunchan as Saleem

== Soundtrack ==
The music was composed by Johnson with lyrics by Madhu Alappuzha.

No.	Song	Singers	Lyrics	Length (m:ss)
1	"Happy Christhmas"	Krishnachandran	Madhu Alappuzha	
2	"Mounam Ponmanithamburu Meetti"	Vani Jairam	Madhu Alappuzha	

== Reception ==
Ann Reejan Mammen, the Arts Club Secretary of All Saints College, Thiruvananthapuram for Malayala Manorama wrote, "Bharathan's latest production, speaks volumes and keeps up the high standard of Malayalam movies. All the actors do full justice to their respective roles especially Gopi and Madhavi, Gopi keeps up the high standard of acting excellence. This movie can be recommended to all with no age bar."

== Awards ==
Kerala State Film Awards - 1982

- Second Best Film
- Best Actor - Bharath Gopi
- Best Actress – Madhavi
- Photography - Vasanth Kumar
- Best Music Director - Johnson
- Best Editor - N.P.Suresh
- Best Art Director - Bharathan
