= Mankada Ravi Varma =

Indian film director (1926–2010)

- Born: 4 June 1926; Mankada, Malappuram, Kerala, India
- Died: 22 November 2010 (aged 84); Chennai, Tamil Nadu, India
- Occupations: Cinematographer; film director
- Years active: 1966–2002

Mankada Ravi Varma (4 June 1926 – 22 November 2010) was an Indian cinematographer and director who worked in Malayalam cinema. He is known for his association with renowned film-maker Adoor Gopalakrishnan,and other major directors such as G. Aravindan and P. N. Menon. Varma also directed two films. He won two National Film Awards and seven Kerala State Film Awards in various categories. In 2006, he was honoured with the J. C. Daniel Award, Kerala government's highest honour for contributions to Malayalam cinema.

== Early life ==
Ravi Varma was born at Mankada in Malappuram district into the senior branch of the royal family of Valluvanad, to K.K. Thampuratti and A.M. Parameswaran Bhattathiripad on 4 June 1926. He attended Victoria College, Palakkad and the Institute of Film Technology (FTIT) in Chennai.

== Career ==
After his studies from FTIT, he worked as a cinematographer for several documentaries and short films. His debut film was Aval (1966) was directed by P.M.A Aziz, another student from the institute. His first notable work was Olavum Theeravum (1970), directed by P. N. Menon and scripted by M. T. Vasudevan Nair. His other notable works as a cinematographer include Dikkatra Parvathi (1973) by Singeetam Srinivasa Rao, Uttarayanam (1974) by G. Aravindan, and almost all the works with Adoor Gopalakrishnan.

=== Association with Adoor ===
Elippathayam (1981) was one of the most acclaimed films came out of their association. He worked mainly with Adoor in his films, before he fell ill in 2002. Nizhalkuthu was their last film. Varma could not complete this work as he fell ill soon after the filming had started. Later, this film was completed by Sunny Joseph. In an interview he said: "I would rate Nizhalkuthu, as Raviettan's best ever work, 30 years after we started our journey together with Swayamvaram."

=== Career as a director ===
In 1984, he directed his first film, Nokkukuthi, which won him another National Award and a State award. "I made it for my own satisfaction. People who are like me will also get satisfaction of watching my film", says Varma. He also directed Kunjikoonan in 1989.

Varma received the Kerala State Film Award for Best Book on Cinema for Chitram Chalachitram.

== Death ==
Ravi Varma died on 22 November 2010 evening in Chennai. He was suffering from Alzheimer's disease for many years.

== Filmography ==
=== As cinematographer ===
- Aval (1967)
- Olavum Theeravum (1970)
- Swayamvaram (1971)
- Dikkatra Parvathi (1974)
- Uttarayanam (1974)
- Kodiyettam (1977)
- Yakshagana (1979)
- Chola Heritage (1980)
- Krishnanattam (1982)
- Kalamandalam Gopi (1995)
- Elippathayam (1981)
- Mukhamukham (1984)
- Anantaram (1987)
- Mathilukal (1990)
- Vidheyan (1993)
- Kathapurushan (1996)
- Koodiyaattam (2001)
- Nizhalkkuthu (2002)

=== As director ===
- Nokkukuthi (1984)
- Kunjikoonan (1989)

== Awards ==
=== Kerala State Awards ===
- 1970: Kerala State Film Award for Best Photography – Olavum Theeravum
- 1972: Kerala State Film Award for Best Photography – Swayamvaram
- 1974: Kerala State Film Award for Best Photography – Uttarayanam
- 1981: Kerala State Film Award for Best Photography – Elippathayam
- 1983: Kerala State Film Award for Best Photography – Nokkukuthi
- 1984: Kerala State Film Award for Best Photography – Mukhamukham
- 1986: Kerala State Film Award for Best Book on Cinema – Chitram Chala Chitram
- 2002: Kerala State Film Award for Best Photography – Nizhalkuthu
- 2005: J. C. Daniel Award (Honorary)

=== National Awards ===
- 1972: National Film Award for Best Cinematography – Swayamvaram
- 1983: National Film Award – Special Jury Award / Special Mention – Nokkukuthi
- 1999: National Film Award for Best Non-Feature Film Cinematography – Kalamandalam Gopi
