= Elippathayam =

- Theatrical release poster
- Directed by: Adoor Gopalakrishnan
- Written by: Adoor Gopalakrishnan
- Produced by: K. Ravindran Nair
- Starring: Karamana Janardanan Nair; Sharada; Jalaja; Rajam K. Nair
- Cinematography: Mankada Ravi Varma
- Edited by: M. Mani
- Music by: M. B. Sreenivasan
- Release date: 30 April 1982
- Running time: 121 minutes
- Country: India
- Language: Malayalam

Elippathayam (Translation: The Rat Trap) is a 1982 Malayalam film written and directed by Adoor Gopalakrishnan. It stars Karamana Janardanan Nair, Sharada, Jalaja, and Rajam K. Nair. The film documents the feudal life in Kerala at its twilight overshadowed with grief, and a sense of carelessness/avoidance as a form of revolt. The protagonist is disenfranchised and trapped within himself and does not want to - unable to change with the social changes taking place around him. The film premiered at the 1982 Cannes Film Festival. It was also screened at the London Film Festival where it won the Sutherland Trophy.

== Plot ==
A middle-aged man, Unni, and his two sisters live in an ancient tharavadu (manor) in Kerala. They struggle as the traditional feudal way of life has become untenable. Eventually, succumbing to the adverse conditions surrounding him, Unni becomes entrapped in his attitudes and ways, helpless like a rat in a trap. The movie's title, 'Rat Trap,' is a metaphor for a state of oblivion to changes in the external world, such as the disintegration of the feudal system in which some are caught, leading to irrelevance and destruction.

The film is set in the now derelict manor house of an aristocratic family that has obviously seen better days. The film begins by showing the audience a rat problem, with Sridevi taking initiative to catch and drown rats in the house. Unni, the patriarch, in spite of the looming changes in the family's fortune and the times, retains old attitudes and is portrayed as proud and incapable of adjusting to the impending downfall of his family. He also lacks the masculine energy or authoritative characteristics of a feudal patriarch. He is seen spending most of his day in idleness and sleeping. His only activities are reading the newspaper and oiling his body. He is taken care of by his sisters and a caretaker neighbor, Scaria Mappila, who looks after the agricultural matters of his estate. His sisters cook, clean, and do all the household chores for him. He seems careless about wanting to get his sisters married and is selfish to keep his support system in place. Mappila handles all the financial aspects for Unni following old feudal ways. Unni is scared and not bothered, or is in avoidance coping, when thieves steal crops from his land, even when he knows that his younger sister is in a premarital relationship, or when he finds his elder sister's son stealing from him and challenging his mating rights/privilege by possibly sleeping with a prostitute who has an eye on him. He does not stand up for himself or for the family and is not ready to face the taunts or threats of his extended family and the villagers.

The middle sister, Rajamma, is devastated by the silence of her brother, who fails to support her when marriage proposals are presented to him. He turns down an offer, deeming it beneath his family's standards, and remains silent and unable to act while she is ailing. This eventually leads to her death, highlighting his lack of insight and disorganized thinking, which incapacitates him from responding to the situation. The younger sister, understanding the plight of things, disregards traditions and elopes with a lover without informing anyone. The eldest sister claims her share of the property but leaves with none, and sends summons through courts. Unni is left alone in the mansion; his paranoid characteristics prevent him from seeking help, and his delusions intensify. He ends up without support, living isolated in the dark corners of his room and not responding to anyone. In the end, a group of people enters his house; he runs out in fear, hits his head, and becomes unconscious. They carry him to the pond where Sreedevi used to drown rats, throw him in, and he is seen walking out of the pond, scared and cold.

== Cast ==
- Karamana Janardanan Nair as Unni
- Sharada as Rajamma
- Jalaja as Sreedevi
- Rajam K Nair as Janamma
- prakash

== Reception ==
Janet Maslin of The New York Times wrote, "As directed by Adoor Gopalakrishnan, Rat Trap is slow, thoughtful and engrossing. It presents Unni and his family as nearcaptives, not merely of their house but also of their history. And it accomplishes this through a series of minute, well-chosen details."

== Awards ==
List of awards and nominations
Ceremony	Category	Recipient(s)	Result	Ref(s)
1982 Kerala State Film Awards	Best Film	Adoor Gopalakrishnan	Won	
1982 BFI London Film Festival	Sutherland Trophy	Adoor Gopalkrishnan	Won	
29th National Film Awards	Best Audiography	P. Devadas	Won	
29th National Film Awards	Best Feature Film in Malayalam	K. Ravindran Nair, Adoor Gopalkrishnan	Won	
