= Kattathe Kilikkoodu =

- Directed by: Bharathan
- Screenplay by: T. Damodaran
- Story by: Nedumudi Venu
- Produced by: P. V. Gangadharan
- Starring: Bharat Gopy; Mohanlal; K.Srividya; Revathi; Anju
- Cinematography: Vasanth Kumar
- Edited by: N. P. Suresh
- Music by: Johnson
- Production company: Grihalakshmi Productions
- Distributed by: Kalpaka Release
- Release date: 23 December 1983
- Country: India
- Language: Malayalam

Kattathe Kilikkoodu (transl. A nest in the wind) is a 1983 Indian Malayalam-language drama film directed by Bharathan and written by T. Damodaran from a story by Nedumudi Venu. The film was produced by P. V. Gangadharan and stars Bharat Gopy, Mohanlal, Srividya, Revathi, and Anju. The music for the film was composed by Johnson. The film was a major commercial success.

The film won three Kerala State Film Awards, including Best Actor for Gopy. It was remade in Tamil as Oonjaladum Uravugal. It marked the Malayalam debut of Revathi.

== Plot ==
Prof. "Shakespeare" Krishna Pillai leads a happy family life with his loving wife, Sarada, a homemaker, and their three daughters and one son. Their neighbor is Indira Thampi, an unmarried woman who experienced a failed romance during her college days. Her niece, Asha Thampi, lives with her while attending college. Asha's close friend, Unnikrishnan, is her college team's sports coach and a family friend of Prof. Krishna Pillai. Asha also attends special classes taught by Prof. Krishna Pillai at his house. Because Unnikrishnan and Sarada share a love for music, they get along very well. However, Asha misinterprets their bond as a romantic attraction, which irritates Unnikrishnan due to her immature behavior.

Disheartened, Asha pretends to be in love with Prof. Krishna Pillai as revenge for Unnikrishnan. Professor was initially hesitant, but slowly begins to like her. He starts going out with her to night clubs and this worries Sarda. She informs about this to Indira and she in turn scolds Asha. In retaliation, Asha leaves Indira's house but she has nowhere else to go. She takes the help of the professor and he gets her admitted to the YWCA hostel.

All the while, Asha makes it a point to avoid Unnikrishnan and he feels terrible and insulted because of that. While at the YWCA hostel, he barges into her room when she informs via the matron that she doesn't want to see him. He asks her repeatedly about her relationship with the professor, but she doesn't give him a clear reply. Unnikrishnan tells Sarda about Asha and her immaturity.

The professor starts distancing from Sarda and this makes her confront him one day in front of their children. Furious, the professor leaves home and takes a room in a hotel. He calls his family and talks to the children but hesitates to talk to Sarda. He is in a great dilemma whether to live with his family or Asha. The next day, he gets Asha to his hotel room and tries to get intimate with her. She gets uncomfortable at this and tries to pull her hands from his. At this moment, Unnikrishnan arrives, confronts Asha, and beats her repeatedly. She finally reveals the truth about her affair with the professor. She hugs Unnikrishnan in front of the professor, making him heartbroken.

Out of shame, the professor drinks heavily on the beach in his car. Unnikrishnan spots him and brings him to his home. After getting rid of a hangover, he happily reunites with his wife and kids.

== Cast ==
- Bharath Gopi as Professor "Shakespeare" Krishna Pillai
- Mohanlal as Unnikrishnan
- Srividya as Sarada
- Revathi as Asha Thampi
- K. P. A. C. Lalitha as Indira Thampi
- Santhakumari
- Anju as Indu

Crew

=== Voice - artists ===
| Artist | Actor/Actress |
|---|---|
| Sreeja | Revathi |

== Soundtrack ==
The film features songs composed by Johnson with lyrics by Kavalam Narayana Panicker, Under Music India

Kattathe Kilikkoodu (Original Motion Picture Soundtrack)
| No. | Title | Singer(s) | Length |
|---|---|---|---|
| 1. | "Gopike Nin Viral" | S. Janaki | 3:24 |
| 2. | "Koovaram Kilikkoodu" | Sujatha Mohan, K. P. Brahmanandan, Sherin Peters, P. V. Sherin | 5:19 |
| 3. | "Nira Nirakkoottil" | K. J. Yesudas, Sujatha Mohan | 4:00 |

== Reception ==
Upon release, the film was well received in the theatres. The film is also noted for the performance of Srividya, often considered as one of the best performances in her career.

== Awards ==
Kerala State Film Awards

- Best Actor – Bharat Gopy
- Best Female Playback Singer – S. Janaki
- Best Art Director – Bharathan

Other awards

- Kerala Film Critics Association Awards for Best Film
- Film Fans Association Award for Best Film
- Rotary Award for Best Film
