= S. Ramesan Nair filmography =

Year	Movie	Song
1985	Pathaamudayam	Kalyaanappenninu
1985	Pathaamudayam	Poonkaavil Paadi
1985	Pathaamudayam	Mangalam Padunna
1985	Pathaamudayam	Thumbikale
1985	Rangam	Vanashree Mukham
1985	Rangam	Swaathi Hridaya
1985	Rangam	Sarggathapassilakum Nimisham
1985	Rangam	Aaraarum Ariyaathe
1985	Rangam	Thamburaan Paattinu
1985	Idanilangal	Indrachaapathin Njaanazhinju
1985	Idanilangal	Vayanaadan Manjalinu
1986	Hello My Dear Wrong Number	Nee Nee Neeyente Jeevan
1986	Hello My Dear Wrong Number	Neeyen Kinaavo
1986	Sree Narayanaguru	Udayakunkumam
1986	Sree Narayanaguru	Vaazhka Vaazhka
1986	Raakkuyilin Raagasadassil	Ethra Pookkaalam
1986	Raakkuyilin Raagasadassil	Swararaagame
1986	Raakkuyilin Raagasadassil	Vallithirumanam
1986	Raakkuyilin Raagasadassil	Poomukhavaathilil
1986	Raakkuyilin Raagasadassil	Ethra Pookkaalam
1986	Dheem Tharikidathom	Kiliye Kiliye
1986	Dheem Tharikidathom	Mandaarangalellaam
1986	Dheem Tharikidathom	Onnaanaam Kunnil
1986	Abhayam Thedi	Thaathintha They
1986	Abhayam Thedi	Maanathu Vethaykkana
1986	Abhayam Thedi	Medakkonnaykku
1986	Abhayam Thedi	Kunnathoru kunniludichu
1987	Achuvettante Veedu	Chandanam Manakkunna
1987	Ezhuthaan Maranna Kadha	Kooduvittukoodu
1987	Ezhuthaan Maranna Kadha	Devagaanam
1987	Ezhuthaan Maranna Kadha	Vaarthinkale
1988	Vichaarana	Oru Poo Viriyunna
1989	Charithram	Aanandam Poovidum
1989	Muthukkudayum Choodi	Thaalathil Chaanchadum
1989	Njangalude Kochu Doctor	Vaarthinkal Paalkkudamenthum
1989	Njangalude Kochu Doctor	Kaattinum Thaalam
1989	Njangalude Kochu Doctor	Meghangal Thenkudangal
1989	Njangalude Kochu Doctor	Mekhangal
1989	Njangalude Kochu Doctor	Uthradakkattinte
1990	Kuruppinte Kanakkupusthakam	Pedamaan Kannee
1990	Kuruppinte Kanakkupusthakam	Theeyum Kaattum Pole
1990	Kuruppinte Kanakkupusthakam	Pularivannu
1990	Kuruppinte Kanakkupusthakam	Edan Thaazhvarayil
1990	Gazal	Naagappaalakal Poovaniyumbol
1990	Gazal	Madhuram Thirumadhuram
1990	Gazal	Virahangal
1992	Vasudha	Alakkozhinja Neramundo
1992	Vasudha	Thaazhampoo
1992	Vasudha	Vasudhe
1992	Vasudha	Vrindaavana Geetham
1994	Sukham Sukhakaram	Rithumathi
1994	Sukham Sukhakaram	Orumikkaam
1994	Sukham Sukhakaram	Thirumozhippenne
1994	Sukham Sukhakaram	Sukhakaram
1994	Sukham Sukhakaram	Oonjale
1994	Vaardhakyapuraanam	Paal Nilaavin
1994	Vaardhakyapuraanam	Vallaathoru Yogam
1995	Boxer	Vaaraani
1995	Boxer	Boxer
1995	Karma	Ellaam Indrajaalam
1995	Karma	Ee Raajaveedhiyil
1995	Aadyathe Kanmani	Madhuvidhuraavukale
1995	Aadyathe Kanmani	Chakkaramuthe
1995	Puthukkottayile Puthumanavaalan	Aaru Paranjaalum (Kadhaprasangam)
1995	Puthukkottayile Puthumanavaalan	Janimrithikal
1995	Aniyan Baava Chettan Baava	Mizhineerin Kaayal
1995	Aniyan Baava Chettan Baava	Mazhavilkkodiyil
1995	Aniyan Baava Chettan Baava	Mizhineerin kaayal
1996	Man of the Match	Nallakaalam Vannu
1996	Man of the Match	Ponnaavani Poomuthe
1996	Man of the Match	Virahamaay
1996	Man of the Match	Kathirum Kothi
1996	Sathyabhaamaykkoru Premalekhanam	Nirathingalo
1996	Sathyabhaamaykkoru Premalekhanam	Nirathingalo Manideepamo
1996	Sathyabhaamaykkoru Premalekhanam	Vellikkinnam Thullumbol
1996	Kudumbakodathi	Dum Dum Thirumukham
1996	Kudumbakodathi	Pandathe Meesha
1996	Swapnalokathe Baalabhaaskaran	Devaamritham
1996	Swapnalokathe Baalabhaaskaran	Swaram Swayam Maranno Sarike
1996	Swapnalokathe Baalabhaaskaran	Title Song
1996	19 April	Sharappoli Maala Chaarthi
1996	19 April	Mazha Peythal
1996	19 April	Arivinum Arulinum
1996	19 April	Devike Nin Meyyil
1996	19 April	Mazha Peythaal
1996	Madaamma	Machunaachi
1996	Madaamma	Swarnam Vilayunna Naadu
1996	Madaamma	Vavakkum Paavakkum
1996	Dilliwaala Raajakumaaran	Akale Nizhalay Aliyum Kiliye
1996	Dilliwaala Raajakumaaran	Nilaathinkal Chiri Maayum
1996	Dilliwaala Raajakumaaran	Poovarashin Kuda Nivarthi
1996	Dilliwaala Raajakumaaran	Pranavathin Swaroopamaam
1996	Dilliwaala Raajakumaaran	Nilaathinkal Chirimaayum
1996	Dilliwaala Raajakumaaran	Kalahapriye Nin Mizhikalil
1996	Kaliveedu	Manassu Oru Maanthrikakkoodu
1996	Kaliveedu	Manassu Oru
1996	Aayiram Naavulla Ananthan	Unniyummachiruthe F
1996	Aayiram Naavulla Ananthan	Unniyammachirutheyi D
1996	Ammuvinte Aangalamar	Nakshathramullaykkum
1996	Ammuvinte Aangalamar	Kanethin Naal
1996	Ammuvinte Aangalamar	Aararumariyaathe
1996	Ammuvinte Aangalamar	Koodozhinja kili
1996	Ammuvinte Aangalamar	Vaishaakappoothinkal
1996	Ammuvinte Aangalamar	Nakshathramullakkum
1996	Sourayoodham	Mazhavil chirakeri F
1996	Sourayoodham	Maarikkulire
1996	Sourayoodham	Thinkalkkidaave
1996	Sourayoodham	Mazhavil chirakeri M
1997	Kalyanappittennu	Venalkkaadum poothu
1997	Kalyanappittennu	Thechimalarkkaadukalil
1997	Kalyanappittennu	Punyampularna
1997	Kalyanappittennu	Thalayodu
1997	Manthramothiram	Chiraku Thedumee
1997	Manthramothiram	Manjin Maarkazhithumpee
1997	Manthramothiram	Aaru Nee Bhadre
1997	Guru	Devasangeetham M
1997	Guru	Minnaaram Maanathu
1997	Guru	Thathaaram Mozhiyamma
1997	Guru	Arunakiranadeepam
1997	Guru	Gurucharanam
1997	Guru	Devasangeetham (D)
1997	Aniyathipraavu	Vennilaa Kadappurathu
1997	Aniyathipraavu	Aniyathipraavinu (Pathos)
1997	Aniyathipraavu	Oru Raajamalli
1997	Aniyathipraavu	Aniyathipraavinu
1997	Aniyathipraavu	Ennum Ninne
1997	Aniyathipraavu	O Priye
1997	Aniyathipraavu	O Priye D
1997	The Car	Raajayogam
1997	The Car	Kamaladalam Moodum
1997	The Car	Kalichirithan Praayam
1997	The Car	Kalichirithan Praayam M
1997	The Car	Kalichirithan Praayam F
1997	The Car	Kamaladalam Moodum
1997	The Car	Kalichirithan Prayam
1997	Kadhaanaayakan	Aalmaram chaayum neram
1997	Kadhaanaayakan	Dhanumaasappenninu
1997	Kadhaanaayakan	Good Morning
1997	Kadhaanaayakan	Aalmaram F
1997	Superman	Onathumbi Paadu
1997	Superman	Marumozhi Thedum Kilimakale
1997	Superman	Aavaaram Poovinmel
1997	Maayapponmaan	Kathirolathumpi D
1997	Maayapponmaan	Ammaanam Chemmaanam
1997	Maayapponmaan	Nimishadalangalil Nee Maatram
1997	Maayapponmaan	Chandanathil Gandha
1997	Maayapponmaan	Aariro Mayangu
1997	Maayapponmaan	Ammaanam Chemmaanam
1997	Maayapponmaan	Kathirolathumpi
1997	Rishyasringan	Snehavaalsalyam
1997	Rishyasringan	Vibhavaree Raagam
1997	Rishyasringan	Kozhippoovante Kodiyadayaalam
1997	Rishyasringan	Omanathinkal Paadiya
1997	Rishyasringan	Koohu Kunju
1997	Rishyasringan	Kaakaa Kalli Kaakkotthi
1997	Rishyasringan	Kaarthika Deepam
1997	Poomarathanalil	Devagaanam
1997	Poomarathanalil	Naanam Choodum
1997	Poomarathanalil	Saami Goswami
1997	Poomarathanalil	Ee Sandhyayum
1997	Poomarathanalil	Oru Kadha Parayaan
1997	Poomarathanalil	Swapnathin Poomarachottil
1997	Poomarathanalil	Devagaanam M
1998	Mayilppeelikkaavu	Mayilaay Parannuvaa D
1998	Mayilppeelikkaavu	Akale
1998	Mayilppeelikkaavu	Anjukannanalla Athalapithala
1998	Mayilppeelikkaavu	Mayilaay Parannuvaa
1998	Mayilppeelikkaavu	Onnaanaam Kunninmel
1998	Mayilppeelikkaavu	Onnaanaam Kunninmel (D)
1998	Mayilppeelikkaavu	Paathiraappoo Choodi
1998	Mayilppeelikkaavu	Paathiraappoo Choodi
1998	Mayilppeelikkaavu	Onnaanaam Kunninmel
1998	Manthrikkochamma	Koodevide Koodevide Oh Mridule
1998	Manthrikkochamma	Onnaamthumbi
1998	Manthrikkochamma	Devalokamaano
1998	Manthrikkochamma	Raanthal Velichathil
1998	Manthrikkochamma	Poo Virinja Pole
1998	Manthrikkochamma	Hridayamuraliyude raagam
1998	Manthrikkochamma	Onnaamthumbi
1998	Manthrikkochamma	Koodevide Koodevide Oh Mridule F
1998	Manthrikkochamma	Anthimukil
1998	Manthrikumaaran	Kala Kala Kalamozhi
1998	Manthrikumaaran	Pongi Pongi Pokanam
1998	Punjabi House	Sonaare
1998	Punjabi House	Udicha Chandirante
1998	Punjabi House	Balla Balla
1998	Punjabi House	Ellaam Marakkaam
1998	Punjabi House	Ellaam Marakkaam
1998	Punjabi House	Eriyunna Kanal
1998	Punjabi House	Balla Balla F
1998	Vismayam	Ezhaam Naalu
1998	Vismayam	Kothichathum
1998	Vismayam	Kunkuma Poo
1998	Vismayam	Ezhaam Nalu
1998	Samaantharangal	Ezhaam Kadal Neenthiyorambili
1998	Samaantharangal	Onnaam kadal
1998	Samaantharangal	Onnaam Kadal
1998	Meenakshikkalyaanam	Manjaadikkunnile Praave
1998	Meenakshikkalyaanam	Swarnappakshi
1998	Meenakshikkalyaanam	Thirayezhuthum Mannil
1998	Meenakshikkalyaanam	Thirayezhuthum Mannil D
1998	Meenakshikkalyaanam	Manjaadikkunnile Praave D
1998	Meenakshikkalyaanam	Thirayezhuthum Mannil D2
1998	Kudumba Vaarthakal	Ponnnusha Kanyake
1998	Kudumba Vaarthakal	Thankamani Thaamarayaay
1998	Kudumba Vaarthakal	Thiruvaanikkaavum
1998	Kudumba Vaarthakal	Ponvilakkenthum
1998	Kudumba Vaarthakal	Dukha Swapnangale Nithya Sathyangale
1998	Kudumba Vaarthakal	Dukha Swapnangale Nithya Sathyangale
1998	Sreekrishnapurathu Nakshathrathilakkam	Thaaram Thaaram
1998	Sreekrishnapurathu Nakshathrathilakkam	Ambilippoomarano
1998	Sreekrishnapurathu Nakshathrathilakkam	Oru Thulli Pala Thulli
1998	Sooryaputhran	Panchavarnnakkulire Paalaazhikkadavil
1998	Sooryaputhran	Kaliyoonjaalaadiyethum
1998	Sooryaputhran	Thenmalare
1998	Sooryaputhran	Thenmalare
1998	Sooryaputhran	Koodariya Kuyilamme
1998	Sooryaputhran	Megha Hamsangal Doothu Poyvarum
1998	Sooryaputhran	Koodariyaa Kuyilamme
1998	Kottaaram Veettile Apputtan	Aavanipponnoonjaal Aadumpol
1998	Kottaaram Veettile Apputtan	Karalinte Novarinjal
1998	Kottaaram Veettile Apputtan	Ambottee
1998	Kottaaram Veettile Apputtan	Aavanipponnoonjal Aadikkam
1998	Harthaal	Vellilakkoodaaram D
1998	Harthaal	Vellilakkoodaaram F
1999	Pranayamazha	Puthumazha Nanayum
1999	Pranayamazha	Eeran Kinaakkalum
1999	Pranayamazha	Aadikkatte
1999	Pranayamazha	Aavani Maasa
1999	Pranayamazha	Saagaropamaam
1999	Pranayamazha	She Is The One
1999	Captain	Kaakkothikkunnallayo
1999	Captain	O Maanathu
1999	Chandranudikkunna Dikkil	Maaya Devakikku Makan Piranne
1999	Chandranudikkunna Dikkil	Manju Peyyana
1999	Chandranudikkunna Dikkil	Thei Oru Thenavayal (Bambaattu Hudugi)
1999	Chandranudikkunna Dikkil	Ambaadippayyukal F
1999	Chandranudikkunna Dikkil	Oru kunjupoo
1999	Chandranudikkunna Dikkil	Thei Oru Thenavayal
1999	Chandranudikkunna Dikkil	Ambaadippayyukal M
1999	Chandranudikkunna Dikkil	Ambaadippayyukal D
1999	Stalin Sivadas (Chenkodi)	Rakthavarnakkodi Pongi
1999	Pranayanilaavu	Paalkkudangal
1999	Pranayanilaavu	Nettiyil Annu Njan Charthithannoru
1999	Pranayanilaavu	Maanathoru Ponthaarakam
1999	Pranayanilaavu	Ponnitta Pettakam
1999	Pranayanilaavu	Thinkalazhcha Nombukal Nottoo
1999	Pranayanilaavu	Kaadu Bharikkum Kizhavan Simham
1999	Pranayanilaavu	Ponnitta Pettakam
1999	Pranayanilaavu	Kunkuma Sandhyathan
1999	Aakaashaganga	Kovaalanum
1999	Aakaashaganga	Oru manjuthulliyil
1999	Aakaashaganga	Puthumazhayai
1999	Aakaashaganga	Kainiraye
1999	Aakaashaganga	Vaikaashithinkalirangum
1999	Aakaashaganga	Vaikaashithinkalirangum D
1999	Aakaashaganga	Manimanchaleri
1999	Aakaashaganga	Puthumazhayai
1999	Njangal Santhushtaraanu	Ponnin Valakilukki
1999	Njangal Santhushtaraanu	Udayam Vaalkkannezhuthi M
1999	Njangal Santhushtaraanu	Iru Meyyum
1999	Njangal Santhushtaraanu	Iru Meyyum D
1999	Njangal Santhushtaraanu	Kannil Thiri Thelikkum
1999	Njangal Santhushtaraanu	Theythey Thaalam
1999	Njangal Santhushtaraanu	Udayam Vaalkannezhuthi
1999	Njangal Santhushtaraanu	Aanalla Pennalla
1999	Independence	Daaha Veenjin Paana Paathrame M
1999	Independence	Nandalaala
1999	Independence	Oru Deepam Kaanan
1999	Independence	Oru Mutham Thedi Doore Poyi
1999	Independence	Daaha Veenjin Paana Paathrame
1999	Independence	Amme Mangala Devi Hare
1999	Independence	Kanikaanum
1999	Independence	Daaha Veenjin Paana Paathrame F
1999	Thennaali Raman	Midukkathikkurumbi
1999	Thennaali Raman	Pathupara ponnu
1999	Thennaali Raman	Achi Konthan
1999	Thennaali Raman	Kaanaatha Swapnam
1999	Devadasi	Divaaswapnam
1999	Devadasi	Yamuna Nadiyozhukum
1999	Devadasi	Devee Hridayaraagam
1999	Devadasi	Dil-E-Naadaan
1999	Devadasi	Paaraalum Maalore
1999	Devadasi	Sudhamanthram
1999	Devadasi	Chalal Chanchala
1999	Devadasi	Pon Vasantham
1999	Sparsham	Indumathippoovirinjathu
1999	Sparsham	Ee Shyaamasandhyayil
1999	Sparsham	Doorathaarakangal
1999	Sparsham	Kalyaanakkuyil Vilikkum
1999	Sparsham	Koodozhinju Kudiyeri Varunnu
1999	Sparsham	Thengi Mounam Thengi
1999	Sparsham	Pandenno Kettathaane
1999	Sparsham	Nakshathrappuzhayil
2000	The Gang	Mizhimunayaal
2000	The Gang	Aavani Maasa
2000	The Gang	Saagaropamam
2000	The Gang	Surabhila
2000	The Gang	Eeran Kinaakkalum
2000	Naadan Pennum Naattupramaaniyum	Minnum Ponnurukki Theerthu
2000	Naadan Pennum Naattupramaaniyum	Madhuramee Sangamam
2000	Naadan Pennum Naattupramaaniyum	Mayilaadum Kunninmel
2000	Naadan Pennum Naattupramaaniyum	Aathirathumbiye
2000	Naadan Pennum Naattupramaaniyum	Aalolam ponnoonjalaadi
2000	Naadan Pennum Naattupramaaniyum	Madhuramee Sangamam D
2000	Naadan Pennum Naattupramaaniyum	Madhuramee Sangamam D
2000	Naadan Pennum Naattupramaaniyum	Sneham Thalirilakalil
2000	Naadan Pennum Naattupramaaniyum	Ilamanassin
2000	Daivathinte Makan	Kaliyaattam Thullalle
2000	Daivathinte Makan	Nilaathumbi Varu
2000	Daivathinte Makan	Boode Bhi There
2000	Daivathinte Makan	Eden Poove
2000	Daivathinte Makan	Muthu Mazhatherottam
2000	Daivathinte Makan	Edan Poove
2000	Daivathinte Makan	Thaalikku Ponnu
2000	Daivathinte Makan	Oh Saayam Sandhya
2000	Darling Darling (2000 film)	Darling Darling
2000	Darling Darling (2000 film)	Pranaya Sowgandhikangal F
2000	Darling Darling (2000 film)	Aniyampoo Muttathu
2000	Darling Darling (2000 film)	Muthum Pavizhavum Mozhikalil
2000	Darling Darling (2000 film)	Chithirappanthalittu
2000	Darling Darling (2000 film)	Darling Darling
2000	Darling Darling (2000 film)	Muthum Pavizhavum
2000	Darling Darling (2000 film)	Pranaya Sowgandhikangal M
2000	Darling Darling (2000 film)	Pranaya Sowgandhikangal D
2000	The Warrant	Manjala Moodiya
2000	The Warrant	Mizhiyevide
2000	The Warrant	Ullaasappoonkaattil
2000	The Warrant	Vaanampaadikkum
2000	Summer Palace	Kili Marachillakalil
2000	Summer Palace	Raathrimulla Pole
2000	Summer Palace	Kili Marachillakalil F
2000	Indriyam	Manjum Thaazhvaaravum
2000	Indriyam	Kalagathai Kaaliyamman
2000	Indriyam	Maarkazhippenne Nin
2000	Indriyam	Manjum Thaazhvaaravum
2000	Sahayaathrikaykku Snehapoorvam	Anaadiyaamen (remix)
2000	Sahayaathrikaykku Snehapoorvam	Olivukal Thaliritto
2000	Sahayaathrikaykku Snehapoorvam	Chellam Chellam Manjadi
2000	Sahayaathrikaykku Snehapoorvam	Pranayakavithakal Lahari Pakarum
2000	Sahayaathrikaykku Snehapoorvam	Muthuvilakkiloru
2000	Sahayaathrikaykku Snehapoorvam	Alasaakolusaapennu remix
2000	Sahayaathrikaykku Snehapoorvam	Alassa Kolassa
2000	Sahayaathrikaykku Snehapoorvam	Anaadiyaam
2000	Priyam	Minnaaminni
2000	Priyam	Snehaswaroopanaam
2000	Priyam	Kunnimani
2000	Priyam	Katturumbinu
2000	Priyam	Neelanilaavin
2000	Priyam	Vaikaashi
2000	Priyam	Katturumbinu M
2000	Priyam	Kunnimani M
2000	Mele Vaaryathe Maalaakhakkuttikal	Kaanappoonkuyil Oru Kavitha M
2000	Mele Vaaryathe Maalaakhakkuttikal	Poochakkaaro Manikettunnallo
2000	Mele Vaaryathe Maalaakhakkuttikal	Mutholakottaaram
2000	Mele Vaaryathe Maalaakhakkuttikal	Kaanappoonkuyil Oru Kavitha D
2000	Mele Vaaryathe Maalaakhakkuttikal	Theyyam Kaattil Thekkan Kaattil
2000	Mimics 2000	Onathumbi Thenil Mungi
2000	Mimics 2000	Kalabhamazha
2000	Nisheedhini	Neelanilaavil
2000	Nisheedhini	Mayilaadumkunnu D
2000	Nisheedhini	Etho Snehalaalanam
2000	Kolothu Naattile Kochu Visheshangal	Kaliveena Maaril Cherkum
2000	Kolothu Naattile Kochu Visheshangal	Ankam Nedi
2001	Bhadra	Kadalu kadakkum
2001	Bhadra	Theerangal thedunnu
2001	Bhadra	Thaarangal( )
2001	Bhadra	Vaarthinkalo
2001	Achaneyaanenikkishtam	Shalabham Vazhimaarumaa
2001	Achaneyaanenikkishtam	Aa thatha
2001	Achaneyaanenikkishtam	Kalivattam
2001	Achaneyaanenikkishtam	Kaatte kaatte
2001	Achaneyaanenikkishtam	Kaatte Kaatte
2001	Dosth	Vaanampole
2001	Dosth	Kilippenne Nilaavin
2001	Dosth	Kilippenne Nilaavin (D)
2001	Dosth	Manju Pole
2001	Dosth	Thathammapperu Thaazhampoo
2001	Dosth	Maaripraave Maayapraave
2001	Naaraanathu Thamburaan	Oh Butterfly Butterfly
2001	Naaraanathu Thamburaan	Thaamarappoove thankanilaave
2001	Naaraanathu Thamburaan	Aayiram Pakshikal Paadi
2001	Naaraanathu Thamburaan	Aathire Yadu Raadhike
2001	Soothradhaaran	Raavil Aaro
2001	Soothradhaaran	Hari Om Shyaama Hare
2001	Soothradhaaran	Perariyam Makayiram
2001	Soothradhaaran	Raavil Aaro
2001	Soothradhaaran	Madhumayee
2001	Meghasandesham	Madhu maasam
2001	Meghasandesham	Changampuzha
2001	Meghasandesham	Mazhanilaavinte
2001	Meghasandesham	Mazhanilaavinte
2001	Bharthaavudyogam	Poomakale
2001	Bharthaavudyogam	Kanikaanum
2001	Aakaashathile Paravakal	Ponnumkudathinu Pottum Venam
2001	Aakaashathile Paravakal	Thathappenne Paattupaadu
2001	Aakaashathile Paravakal	Kalabhakkuriyitta
2001	Aakaashathile Paravakal	Angaadi Veettinu
2001	Aakaashathile Paravakal	Kaattoonjaalidaam
2001	Aakaashathile Paravakal	Moopparukkoru naalukettaal
2001	Aakaashathile Paravakal	Ponnumkudathinu Pottum Venam M
2001	Aakaashathile Paravakal	Thathappenne
2001	Aakaashathile Paravakal	Ponnumkudathinu Pottum Venam F
2001	Raakshasa Raajaavu	Kannaare Kannaare
2001	Raakshasa Raajaavu	Indumathee Ithal Mizhiyil
2001	Raakshasa Raajaavu	Indumathee Ithal Mizhiyil D
2001	Raakshasa Raajaavu	Marikkaattu Veeshi
2001	Raakshasa Raajaavu	Paalinu Madhuram
2001	Raakshasa Raajaavu	Sharathkaala Mukile
2001	The Gift of God	Sankeerthanam
2001	The Gift of God	Aa Kanakathaaramo
2001	The Gift of God	Aa Kanakathaaramo
2001	The Gift of God	Amme Amme
2001	The Gift of God	Manikkuyile
2001	The Gift of God	Mizhikal
2001	The Gift of God	Panineer Poovilum
2001	Raajapattam	Thalivilakkum thamarathenum
2001	Raajapattam	Kanikaanum
2001	Raajapattam	Kannampoo kannadi
2001	Raajapattam	Kannampoo kannadi M
2001	Raajapattam	Panchavarnnakkili
2001	Raajapattam	Panineer Paadathu D
2001	Raajapattam	Panineer Paadathu F
2002	Kaakki Nakshathram	Kurumozhiyalle
2002	Kaakki Nakshathram	Kathirolakkaattinu
2002	Malayaali Maamanu Vanakkam	Kanmaniye
2002	Malayaali Maamanu Vanakkam	Thakathakadhoom
2002	Malayaali Maamanu Vanakkam	Vaaniludikkum M
2002	Malayaali Maamanu Vanakkam	Vaaniludikkum F
2002	Malayaali Maamanu Vanakkam	Maama Malayaali Maama
2002	Malayaali Maamanu Vanakkam	Kanmaniye
2002	Malayaali Maamanu Vanakkam	Kaathala Kaathala
2002	Vaalkkannaadi	Manikkuyile
2002	Vaalkkannaadi	Manikkuyile
2002	Vaalkkannaadi	Naarayaneeyamam
2002	Vaalkkannaadi	Vaalkkannaadi
2002	Vaalkkannaadi	Annaarakkannaa (Thintakatharo)
2002	Vaalkkannaadi	Makale
2002	Vaalkkannaadi	Amme Amme
2002	Vaalkkannaadi	Kukku kukku
2002	Mazhathullikkilukkam	Kinaavinte
2002	Mazhathullikkilukkam	Therirangum
2002	Mazhathullikkilukkam	Velippenninu
2002	Mazhathullikkilukkam	Puthuvettam
2002	Mazhathullikkilukkam	Raavinte Devahridayathin
2002	Mazhathullikkilukkam	Swargam
2002	Mazhathullikkilukkam	Raavinte Devahridayathin F
2002	Kanmashi	Thithai thithai
2002	Kanmashi	Ambili Maamanumundallo
2002	Kanmashi	Valakilukkana
2002	Kanmashi	Chakkaramaavin
2002	Kanmashi	Ambili Maamanumundallo
2002	Kanmashi	Chakkara Maavin (F )
2002	Kanmashi	Chakkara Maavin (Sad)
2002	Kanalkkireedam	Aazhithirakal M
2002	Kanalkkireedam	Aazhithirakal
2002	Kanalkkireedam	Ariyaatha Jeevithayaathra Than
2002	Kanalkkireedam	Nilaave Neeyen Manassinte Theeram
2002	Kanalkkireedam	Daiva Sneham
2002	Kanalkkireedam	Sougandhikam
2002	Ente Hridayathinte Udama	Thankanilaavum
2002	Ente Hridayathinte Udama	Pranayam
2002	Kayyethum Doorathu	Akkayyilikkayyille
2002	Kayyethum Doorathu	Priyasakhi
2002	Kayyethum Doorathu	Aadyamaay
2002	Kayyethum Doorathu	Gokulathil
2002	Kayyethum Doorathu	Poove oru
2002	Kayyethum Doorathu	Aravindanayana
2002	Kayyethum Doorathu	Asalasalaay
2002	Kayyethum Doorathu	Vasantharaavin
2002	Punyam	Thanneerppanthalile
2002	Punyam	Pularolithan Malarilo (D)
2002	Punyam	Kumkuma Raaga Paraaga
2002	Punyam	Thanneerppanthalile
2002	Punyam	Devathe Kelkumo
2002	Punyam	Kumkuma Raaga Paraaga
2002	Punyam	Pularolithan Malarilo
2002	Nakshathrakannulla Raajakumaaran Avanundoru Raajakumaari	Kalarikkum
2002	Nakshathrakannulla Raajakumaaran Avanundoru Raajakumaari	Ore Mugham
2002	Nakshathrakannulla Raajakumaaran Avanundoru Raajakumaari	Ore Mugham
2002	Nakshathrakannulla Raajakumaaran Avanundoru Raajakumaari	Poomaanam
2002	Nakshathrakannulla Raajakumaaran Avanundoru Raajakumaari	Thankam Kondoru (Punchiri Mottinu)
2002	Nakshathrakannulla Raajakumaaran Avanundoru Raajakumaari	Manassukal Thammil Puthooram
2002	Nakshathrakannulla Raajakumaaran Avanundoru Raajakumaari	Sundari
2002	Pakalppooram	Maayam chollum
2002	Pakalppooram	Mohaswaroopini
2002	Pakalppooram	Pakalppooram
2002	Pakalppooram	Nadavazhiyum
2002	Pakalppooram	Hey shingari
2002	www.anukudumbam.com	Akkam Pakkam
2002	www.anukudumbam.com	Mazhamukilinu Kaavadiyattam
2002	Chathurangam	Chandanakoottinakathoru
2002	Grand Mother	Kaviyaanu Njan
2002	Grand Mother	Aareeram Paadum
2002	Grand Mother	Poove Poli Paadivaroo
2002	Grand Mother	Munnil Policum
2002	Grand Mother	Kochu Kuttathi
2002	Grand Mother	Thechikkaadinum
2003	Swapnam Kondu Thulaabhaaram	Kaathoram
2003	Swapnam Kondu Thulaabhaaram	Vaarmegha
2003	Swapnam Kondu Thulaabhaaram	Ormakale
2003	Swapnam Kondu Thulaabhaaram	Parannu Vannoru
2003	Swapnam Kondu Thulaabhaaram	Kinginippoove
2003	Kaalavarkki	Irulunnu
2003	Malsaram	Ilam Khalbile Malar Painkili
2003	Malsaram	Ponnambili Ponnambili
2003	Malsaram	Poonilakkulire Vaayo (D)
2003	Malsaram	Hey Kaale
2003	Malsaram	Poonilaakkulire Vaayo
2003	Malsaram	Ilam Khalbile Malar Painkili
2003	Malsaram	Dhadak Dhadak
2003	Jameendaar	Aakaashappooppaadam
2003	Jameendaar	Kanakashilayiloru
2003	Jameendaar	Ennuyire
2003	Jameendaar	Uyire
2003	Jameendaar	Muthampakarum
2003	Jameendaar	Muthampakarum
2003	Uthara	Sree Ragaamrutham Choriyukayille
2003	Uthara	Kaikkumbilil Kanneer
2003	Uthara	Manninum Penninum
2003	Uthara	Devi Priye
2003	Uthara	Manninum Penninum F
2003	Uthara	Sree Mahaadevante
2003	Uthara	Kanneer Panthalil
2003	Uthara	Ushase Ushase
2003	Chandramukhi	Illikkaadum Moolum
2003	Chandramukhi	Kannaaram
2003	Chandramukhi	Kannaaram Poomutthu
2003	Chandramukhi	Paathiraamazhachinthu
2003	Chithrakoodam	Sreeraagam
2003	Chithrakoodam	Chandiranaano Maanathu
2003	Chithrakoodam	Kunji Chittolam
2003	Chithrakoodam	Sreeraagam
2003	Chithrakoodam	Chandiranaano Maanathu
2004	Kusruthy	Dum Dum
2004	Kusruthy	Mindaappennu
2004	Kusruthy	Muthu Muthu Manikkuyile
2004	Kusruthy	Naagathaan Kaavilamme
2004	Kusruthy	Mindaappennu M
2004	Kusruthy	Dum Dum Dhimithaalam M
2004	Ee Snehatheerathu (Saamam)	Aadi Mahaamahassin
2004	Ee Snehatheerathu (Saamam)	Udhayaardra Kiranangal
2004	Ee Snehatheerathu (Saamam)	Pakalin Chithayeriyum
2004	Kanninum Kannaadikkum	Maarikolunthe Manakkanathenth
2004	Kanninum Kannaadikkum	Kaithozhaam
2004	Kanninum Kannaadikkum	Nilaakkili
2004	Kanninum Kannaadikkum	Pachakkilipadu
2004	Vellinakshathram	Maanazhako
2004	Vellinakshathram	Maanazhako
2004	Vellinakshathram	Chandana Mukile
2004	Vellinakshathram	Chakkarakkili
2004	Vellinakshathram	Chandana Mukile
2004	Sathyam	Kallakkurumbi
2004	Kottaaram Vaidyan	Chakkarachi
2004	Kottaaram Vaidyan	Makam Pirannoru
2004	Kottaaram Vaidyan	Parayaathe Vayyen Uyire (D)
2004	Kottaaram Vaidyan	Parayaathe Vayyen Uyire
2004	Thaalamelam	Pachamani Painkili
2004	Thaalamelam	Devike Devike Vala Kilungi
2005	Kalyaanakkurimaanam	Kalyanam kalyanam
2005	Kalyaanakkurimaanam	Thotte thotte
2005	Kalyaanakkurimaanam	Thalirani mulle
2005	Kalyaanakkurimaanam	Dil dil strawberry
2005	Kalyaanakkurimaanam	Mazhanilaavin
2005	Kalyaanakkurimaanam	Keralam oru
2005	Kalyaanakkurimaanam	Mindaattam venda
2005	Kalyaanakkurimaanam	Penpoove
2005	Videshi Nair Swadeshi Nair	Maarikkaavil Thrikkodiyettinu D
2005	Videshi Nair Swadeshi Nair	Oru Thullithenum
2005	Videshi Nair Swadeshi Nair	Maarikkaavil Thrikkodiyettinu
2005	Videshi Nair Swadeshi Nair	Maari kkaavil Thrikkodiyettinu M
2005	Videshi Nair Swadeshi Nair	Thaalam Thaalam
2006	Kalabham	Shivapadam Thozhuthuvaa
2006	Kalabham	Oru Meghanaadam
2006	Kalabham	Varu Varu
2006	Kalabham	Snehikkaan
2006	Kalabham	Devasandhya
2006	Kalabham	Devasandhya F
2006	Kalabham	Varu Varu Short
2006	Gopaalapuraanam	Thanuppulla
2006	Gopaalapuraanam	Therodum
2006	Gopaalapuraanam	Neelanilaavo
2006	Gopaalapuraanam	Nee Nilaavo
2006	Gopaalapuraanam	Anuraaga
2006	Gopaalapuraanam	Aarum Kaanathiniyum Njaan
2006	Gopaalapuraanam	Neelanilaavo
2009	Sanmanassullavan Appukkuttan	Aaromale
2009	Sanmanassullavan Appukkuttan	Vellitthinkal
2009	Sanmanassullavan Appukkuttan	Kallane Pidichu Ketti
2009	Sanmanassullavan Appukkuttan	Aaraadhike Oru Peelikkinaavaayi
2009	Kadhaparayum Theruvoram	Thoda Thoda Malum
2009	Kadhaparayum Theruvoram	Therupone Thevarum Pone
2009	Kadhaparayum Theruvoram	Ammamaare Vannaatte
2009	Kadhaparayum Theruvoram	Kunjee Vaave Vaavo
2009	Kadhaparayum Theruvoram	Kilungu Kilungu
2009	Kadhaparayum Theruvoram	Katturumbinte Kaathu
2009	Kadhaparayum Theruvoram	Kunjee Vaave Vaavo
2009	Kadhaparayum Theruvoram	Kannezhuthi
2009	Ivar Vivaahitharaayaal	Poomukha Vaathilkkal
2009	Gulumaal - The Escape	Thaam Tharikida
2009	Gulumaal - The Escape	Gulumaal
2010	Mohakkottaaram	Onathumbikal Paadum
2010	Pathinonnil Vyaazham	Ini Enna
2010	Pathinonnil Vyaazham	Ini Enna M
2010	Pathinonnil Vyaazham	Janicha Kaalam
2010	Pathinonnil Vyaazham	Maargazhi
2010	Pathinonnil Vyaazham	Puthiyoru Sooryanudikkunnu
2010	Kuttisraanku	Oru Minnaaminni
2010	Plus Two	Puthumakalaay
2010	Plus Two	Thaamarakkatte
2010	Plus Two	Vellaaram Kannulla
2010	Plus Two	Thaane
2010	Plus Two	Pakalilla Raavilla
2010	Plus Two	Thaane
2010	Plus Two	Kannolam
2010	Plus Two	Kannolam V2
2010	Plus Two	Manchaadi
2011	Traffic	Unaroo Mizhiyazhake
2011	Traffic	Kannerinjaal
2011	Traffic	Unaroo Mizhiyazhake
2011	Traffic	Unaroo Mizhiyazhake
2011	Traffic	Pakalin
2011	Kanmani	Ambilimaama
2011	Swami	Maamalayil
2011	Swami	Ayyan Thiruvadi
2011	Swami	Mazhayo Mazha
2011	Swami	Kannaa Kaarmukil Varnaa
2011	Swami	Maalayittu
2011	Swami	Kaadaaya Kaattil
2011	Swami	Kaadinte Ullil
2011	Swami	Narayana Narayana
2011	Swami	Harivaraasanam
2011	Swami	Azhakin Azhake
2013	Avarude Veedu	Onnalla Randalla
2013	Avarude Veedu	Melle Manasinte
2013	Avarude Veedu	Mohikkum Kayyile
2013	Avarude Veedu	Vaathil Chaaralle
2014	@Andheri	Karumpanaanu Kannan
2015	White Boys	Mele Mele
2016	Maanasaantharappetta Yezdi	Mazhayude
2017	Bobby	Ithalidum
2019	Vishudha Pusthakam	Mullakal
2019	Aakashaganga 2	Puthumazhayayi (Remix)
