= Baiju Santhosh =

Indian actor

- Born: Baiju Santhosh Kumar; Thiruvananthapuram, Kerala, India
- Other name: B. Santhosh Kumar
- Occupation: Actor
- Years active: 1981–present
- Spouse: Ranjitha Baiju (m. 1995)
- Children: 2

Baiju Santhosh Kumar is an Indian actor who works in Malayalam films. He began his acting career in 1981, as a child artist in the film Maniyan Pilla Adhava Maniyan Pilla. Since then he has acted in more than 300 films.

== Acting career ==
He began acting by debuting in Balachandra Menon-directed film Maniyan Pilla Adhava Maniyan Pilla in 1981. He has mostly done character roles and comedy roles.

He got a career breakthrough with the film Puthan Panam directed by Ranjith. His portrayal of Stephen Achayan in Ente Mezhuthiri Athazhangal was critically acclaimed.

In 2019, he did lead role in Nadirshah's Mera Naam Shaji along with Asif Ali and Biju Menon.

== Personal life ==
Baiju Santhosh Kumar hails from Thiruvananthapuram. He is born to Bhaskaran Nair and Thankamma. He married Ranjitha in 1995. The couple has a daughter, R. Aishwarya, a doctor, and a son, Loknath. Currently he resides in Thiruvananthapuram with his family.

== Controversy ==
In 2024, Santhosh was arrested by the Kerala police on 14 October for allegedly driving his car rashly under the influence of alcohol and hitting a two-wheeler.

== Selected filmography ==
=== Films ===
Year	Title	Role	Notes
1981	Maniyanpilla Adhava Maniyanpilla		Child artist
1982	Kelkatha Shabdam	Ravikuttan	Child artist
1983	Karyam Nissaram	Biju	Child artist
1984	Poochakkoru Mookkuthi	Chikku	Child artist
1984	April 18	Boy in police station	Child artist
1984	Aattuvanchi Ulanjappol	Vakkan	Child artist
1985	Ente Ammu Ninte Thulasi Avarude Chakki	Newspaper boy	Child artist
1985	Daivatheyorthu		Child artist
1985	Vannu Kandu Keezhadakki	Tinku	Child artist
1985	Onningu Vannengil	Young Mohandas	Child artist
1985	Nirakkoottu	Boy at the petrol station	Child artist
1986	Naale Njangalude Vivaham	Nanappan	
1986	Veendum	Bike passenger	
1986	Aayiram Kannukal	Patient	
1986	Ennu Nathante Nimmi	Venkiti	
1987	Ivide Ellavarkum Sukham		
1987	Vilambaram	Hotel boy	
1988	Kandathum Kettathum	Ganeshan	
1988	Kudumbapuranam	Gopu	
1988	Dhinarathrangal	Biju	
1988	Chaaravalayam	Arun	
1989	News	Arun	
1989	Vadakkunokkiyantram	Prakashan	
1989	Mudra	Vinayan	
1989	Najangalude Kochu Doctor	Gopi	
1990	Aaraam Waardil Aabhyanthara Kalaham		
1990	Kottayam Kunjachan	Bosco	
1990	Gajakesariyogam	Thampi Thomas	
1991	Kankettu		
1991	Innathe Program	Dasappan	
1991	Nagarathil Samsara Vishayam	Krishnankutty	
1991	Aakaashakottayile Sulthaan	Vishwambharan	
1991	Mimics Parade	Manoj	
1991	Parallel College	Hameed	
1991	Kuttapathram	Tony	
1991	Souhrudam	Reny	
1991	Kadalora Kattu	Daniel	
1992	Kasargod Khader Bhai	Manoj	
1992	Neelakurukkan	Sudheer	
1993	Vakkeel Vasudev	Lalu	
1993	Sthalathe Pradhana Payyans	Siyad	
1993	Sakshal Sreeman Chathunni	Dasan	
1993	Uppukandam Brothers	Uppukandam Thankachan	
1993	Sthreedhanam	Prasad	
1994	Ilayum Mullum		
1994	Rajadhani	Jaggu	
1994	Shudhamaddalam		
1994	Dollar	Chandikunju	
1994	Cabinet	Punnoose	
1994	Kambolam	Sunnychan	
1994	Chukkan	Vigneshwaren / Vicky	
1994	Kudumba Vishesham	Santhosh	
1994	Gamanam	Vinayan	
1994	Njan Kodiswaran	Sunny	
1994	Commissioner	Sunny Thomas	
1994	Kadal		
1995	Sargavasantham	Chandran	
1995	Samudhayam	Salim	
1995	Rajakeeyam	Kannan	
1995	Street		
1995	Pai Brothers	Thrivikraman	
1995	Achan Kompathu Amma Varampathu	Gopikrishnan	
1995	Killikurushiyile Kudumba Mela	Pemachandran	
1996	Harbour	Sunnykutty	
1996	Vaanarasena	Joykutti / Ulpalakshan	Lead role
1996	Sulthan Hyderali	Kunjali	
1996	Aramana Veedum Anjoorekkarum	Amminikuttan	
1996	Hitlist		
1997	Mannadiar Penninu Chenkotta Checkan	Rajendra Mannadiyar	
1997	Sankeerthanam Pole	Georgekutty Mathew	
1997	Poothumbiyum Poovalanmarum	Hyder	
1997	Kalyana Kacheri	Balan	
1997	Kalyana Unnikal	Mammus	
1997	Arjunan Pillayum Anchu Makkalum	Ajayan	
1997	Vamsam		Cameo
1998	Meenakshi Kalyanam	Wilson	
1998	Gloria Fernandes From U.S.A.	Babychan Manimala	
1998	Mattupetti Machan	Kannappan/Kannan	
1998	Malabaril Ninnoru Manimaaran		
1999	Captain	Rajan	
1999	Auto Brothers	Krishnan	
1999	My Dear Karadi	Rajappan	
2000	Mark Antony	Parayel Kariyachan	
2001	Sravu	Kannan	
2001	Bhadra	Boban	
2001	Nagaravadhu	Eby Kuruvila	
2001	Dupe Dupe Dupe		
2002	Chirikkudukka	Premanand	
2002	Thillana Thillana		
2003	Pattanathil Sundaran	Venugopal	
2003	Varum Varunnu Vannu		
2003	Kilichundan Mampazham	Amina's Uncle	
2004	Mampazhakkalam	Sethu	
2004	Vettam	Gopalakrishnan's brother	
2004	Vamanapuram Bus Route	Kuryappan	
2004	Kottaram Vaidyan		
2005	Alice in Wonderland	Lonappan	
2005	Sarkar Dada	Murali	
2006	Raashtram		
2006	Notebook		
2007	Detective	Suresh	
2007	Indrajith		
2008	Magic Lamp	Mohanakrishnan	
2008	College Kumaran	Minster Sethunathan's Party Person	
2008	Twenty:20	Satheeshan, Devan's henchman	
2008	Kerala Police	Mukunda Verma	
2009	Sagar Alias Jacky		
2009	Seetha Kalyanam		
2009	Angel John	Karate Master	
2010	Khilafath		
2010	Pramani	Vishwanatha Panicker's brother-in-law	
2010	Best Actor	Police Officer	
2010	Again Kasargod Khader Bhai	Manoj	
2010	Best of Luck		
2011	Makeup Man	Soorya (Anaamika)'s first makeup-man	
2011	Melvilasom		
2011	Uppukandam Brothers Back in Action	Uppukandam Thankachen	
2011	Krishna Rajapuram		
2011	Flat No :69		Director
2012	Thalsamayam Oru Penkutty	Toddy Drinker	
2012	Ee Adutha Kaalathu	Watson	
2012	Lisammayude Veedu	Rajappan Uduma	
2012	Achante Aanmakkal	Koyikkal Mohandas	
2012	Kochi To Kodambaakkam		
2013	Left Right Left	Advocate Preman	
2013	Careebeyans	Rajeev	
2013	Pakaram		
2013	Up & Down: Mukalil Oralundu	Sam Christy	
2014	Black Forest		
2014	Angels	SP Ashok Kumar	
2015	Saaradhi		
2016	Style	Prakashan	
2016	Mudhugauv	C.I. Pathmanabhan aka Padayappa	
2016	Karinkunnam 6's	Lalu	
2016	Swarna Kaduva	Inspector Sasidharan	
2017	Puthan Panam	Neutral Kunjappan	
2017	Sakhavu	Garuda Kankaani	
2017	Pokkiri Simon	SI Sathyan	
2017	Aadu 2	Panchayath President Uthup	
2018	Kammara Sambhavam	Francis' Friend	
2018	Vikadakumaran	Adv. Sundareshan Nadar a.k.a. KD	
2018	Aravindante Athidhikal	Hari	
2018	Ente Mezhuthiri Athazhangal	Stephen Maiyyeruthottathil	
2018	Drama	Sindhukumar (Podiyan)	
2019	Mikhael	Dr.James Cherian	
2019	Jeem Boom Bhaa	Ravi	
2019	Lucifer	Murugan	
2019	An International Local Story	Senior Police officer	
2019	Mera Naam Shaji	Shaji	Lead role
2019	Oru Yamandan Premakadha	S.I Pavan Kalyan	
2019	My Great Grandfather	S.I Vincent Gomas	
2019	Evidey	S.I Simon Tharakan	
2019	Thankabhasma Kuriyitta Thamburatti	Charles Shobaraj	
2019	Margamkali	Antappan, Jessy's Father	
2019	Pattabhiraman	Valsan	
2019	Happy Sardar	Happy's uncle	
2020	Shylock	Balakrishna Panicker	
2020	Mariyam Vannu Vilakkoothi	S.I	
2020	Uriyadi	Mathai	
2021	Anugraheethan Antony	Pichathipidi Dasappan	
2021	Pidikkittapulli	Thomas Kurian	
2021	Vidhi		
2021	Vellam	Shaji	
2021	Kshanam	Ambareesh	
2021	Minnal Murali	S.I Sajan Antony	Released on Netflix
2022	Kooman	Thambi	
2022	Vaashi	Adv. Satheesh Mulloor	
2022	Kaduva	Adv. Kora	
2022	Subhadhinam	Director Mangalassery	
2022	Vamanan	C I Rajesh	
2022	Aanandam Paramanandam	Sudhan	
2023	Boomerang	'Malayali' Osho	
2023	Laika	Nadarajan	
2023	Kolaambi	Moulavi	
2023	RDX: Robert Dony Xavier	CI Roy Sebastian	
2024	Guruvayoor Ambalanadayil	Dr. Purushothaman	
2024	CID Ramachandran Retd. SI	Advocate Lalji	
2024	Once Upon a Time in Kochi	DYSP Cylex Abraham	
2024	Nunakkuzhi	CI Abraham Tharakan	
2024	Thundu	Police Commissioner Sathyachandran	
2024	Virunnu	Balan Uncle	
2024	Oru Anweshanathinte Thudakkam	Sunil Mani	
2024	Njan Kandatha Sare		
2025	Ennu Swantham Punyalan		
2025	L2: Empuraan	Murugan	
2025	Vyasanasametham Bandhumithradhikal	Venu	
2025	JSK: Janaki V v/s State of Kerala	SI Kanakaraj	
2025	Adinaasam Vellapokkam	Park Ranger	
2025	Bha Bha Ba	CM C. K. Joseph	
2026	Uyir		
2026	Varavu		

=== As dubbing artist ===
Year	Title	Dubbed For	Character	Notes
2023	Alone	Himself	ASI Rasheed	

=== Television ===
- Comedy Utsavam 3 (2023) (Flowers) - Judge
- Star Magic (2021) (Flowers) - Guest
- Comedy Stars Season 2 (Asianet) - Judge
- Bhamini Tholkarilla (2009)(Asianet)
- Suryaputhri (2005) (Asianet)
- Badai Bunglaw (2016) (Asianet)
- Swami Ayyappan (2007)(Asianet)
- Parasparam (2000-2001) (Surya TV)
- Kadamattathu Kathanar (2004) (Asianet)
