= Kilukilukkam =

- Directed by: Balachandra Menon
- Written by: Balachandra Menon
- Screenplay by: Balachandra Menon
- Produced by: S. Kumar
- Starring: Balachandra Menon; Shanthi Krishna; Sukumari; Venu Nagavally
- Cinematography: Vipin Mohan
- Edited by: G. Venkittaraman
- Music by: Johnson; O N V Kurup (lyrics)
- Production company: Sastha Productions
- Distributed by: Sastha Productions
- Release date: 7 May 1982
- Country: India
- Language: Malayalam

Kilukilukkam is a 1982 Indian Malayalam language film, directed by Balachandra Menon and produced by S. Kumar. The film stars Balachandra Menon, Shanthi Krishna, Sukumari and Venu Nagavally. The film has musical score by Johnson.

== Plot ==
The story is set in Bangalore where Mahendran a rich and pompous businessman awaits arrival of artists at the train station for programs for Malayali association. But he could not find anyone arriving by Island express. Classical dancer Anjali along with her mother and brother, Jambu arrives on a later train. A young man, Murali passing by recognizes Anjali from a previous program and helps them to reach their hotel.

Mahendran meets them at the hotel and immediately gets attracted to Anjali. Despite the show being postponed, Mahendran insists Anjali and family to stay and take them to see around the city. He tries to show off his wealth and influence to Anjaly and family.

After the successful dance program, Murali comes up to the green room to congratulate Anjali. They again meet at a footwear shop where he is salesman. Anjali falls in love with him and buys a sandal a day. Mahendran learns about the relationship from Sulaiman, the shop owner who happened to be a friend. Sulaiman fires Murali and informs Anjali that Murali was fired for misbehaving with another girl.

Anjali traces down Murali and reveals her love. Murali also reciprocates the feeling. As their love blossoms, an angry Mahendran beats up Murali. Mahendran proposes to Anjali. When she rejects, Mahendran threatens to kill Murali.

Murali and Anjali elopes and settles down in a rented house. They acquaint neighbor Adv Viswanath who helps them register the marriage. Mahendran arranges Police warrant, but can not execute it since the marriage is solemnized . But later on however in an accident murali dies which leaves anjali heartbroken. She also remember mahendran's threat of killing murali. She believes he is behind her husband's death. But mahendran was not behind it and not even aware. But mistaking mahendran anjali plans to destroy him. Mahendran after seeing Anjali happily living has moved on to his life. So the plot then moves on how Anjali seeks revenge on him without knowing his innocence.

== Cast ==
- Balachandra Menon as Mahendran
- Shanthi Krishna as Anjali
- Sukumari
- Venu Nagavally as Murali
- Radhika
- Shubha
- Maniyanpilla Raju as Jambu
- D. P. Nair
- Sreenath as Adv. Viswanath
- Sumalatha

== Soundtrack ==
The music was composed by Johnson.

| No. | Song | Singers | Lyrics | Length (m:ss) |
|---|---|---|---|---|
| 1 | "Anjali Pushpaanjali" | S. Janaki | O. N. V. Kurup | |
| 2 | "Mandra Madhura Mridanga" | K. J. Yesudas | O. N. V. Kurup | |
| 3 | "Priyatharamaakum Oru Nadham" | Vani Jairam | O. N. V. Kurup | |
| 4 | "Shivashaila Shringamaam" | K. J. Yesudas | O. N. V. Kurup | |
