= K. P. Hariharaputhran =

Indian film editor (1944–2023)

- Born: 3 January 1944; British Raj
- Died: 26 August 2023 (aged 79); Thiruvananthapuram, Kerala, India
- Occupation: Film editor
- Years active: 1971−2019
- Notable work: Sheshakriya, Sukhamo Devi, Punjabi House, Mayavi, Vadakkumnadhan, Chathikkatha Chanthu, Pandippada, Thommanum Makkalum

K. P. Hariharaputhran (3 January 1944 – 26 August 2023) was an Indian film editor who worked in Malayalam cinema. Born on 3 January 1944, he started his career as an assistant to K. Sankunni for the film, Vilakku Vangiya Veena in 1971 and his first assignment as an independent editor was in 1979 for Kalliyankattu Neeli. He edited over 80 films which included commercially successful films such as Sheshakriya, Sukhamo Devi, Punjabi House, Mayavi, Vadakkumnadhan, Pandippada, Thommanum Makkalum and Chathikkatha Chanthu.

Hariharaputhran died at his residence in Thiruvananthapuram on 26 August 2023, at the age of 79.

== Filmography ==
Title	Year	Director
Kalliyankattu Neeli	1979	M. Krishnan Nair
Ithum Oru Jeevitham	1982	Veliyam Chandran
Sheshakriya	1982	Ravi Alummodu
Prashnam Gurutharam	1983	Balachandra Menon
April 18	1984	Balachandra Menon
Arante Mulla Kochu Mulla	1984	Balachandra Menon
Oru Painkilikatha	1984	Balachandra Menon
Dheivatheyorthu	1985	Balachandra Menon
Manicheppu Thurannappol	1985	Balachandra Menon
Ente Ammu Ninte Thulasi Avarude Chakki	1985	Balachandra Menon
Guruji Oru Vakku	1985	Rajan Sankaradi
Kannaram Pothi Pothi	1985	Hassan
Sukhamo Devi	1986	Venu Nagavally
Vivahithare Ithile	1986	Balachandra Menon
Ashtabandham	1986	Askar
Vilambaram	1987	Balachandra Menon
Vamban	1987	Hassan
Ivide Ellavarkkum Sukham	1987	Jeassy
Neeyethra Dhanya	1987	Jeassy
Sarvakalashala	1987	Venu Nagavally
Ayitham	1988	Venu Nagavally
David David Mr. David	1988	Viji Thampi
Witness	1988	Viji Thampi
Onninu Purake Mattonnu	1988	Thulasidas
Kaalal Pada	1989	Viji Thampi
Nagarangalil Chennu Raparkam	1989	Viji Thampi
Swagatham	1989	Viji Thampi
Marupuram	1990	Viji Thampi
Samrajyam	1990	Jomon
Anaswaram	1991	Jomon
Nattuvisesham	1991	Paul Njarakkal
Amina Tailors	1991	Sajan
Thiruthalvaadi	1992	Viji Thampi
Sarovaram	1993	Jeassy
Thalamaura	1993	K. Madhu
Journalist	1993	Viji Thampi
CID Unnikrishnan B.A., B.Ed.	1994	Rajasenan
Chakoram	1994	M. A. Venu
Aniyan Bava Chetan Bava	1995	Rajasenan
Puthukkottayile Puthumanavalan	1995	Rafi–Mecartin
Kireedamillatha Rajakkanmar	1996	Kalabhavan Ansar
Dilliwala Rajakumaran	1996	Rajasenan
Sathyabhamakkoru Premalekhanam	1996	Rajasenan
Swarnnakireedam	1996	V. M. Vinu
Karunyam	1997	A. K. Lohithadas
Killikkurishiyile Kudumbamela	1997	Viji Thampi
Superman	1997	Rafi–Mecartin
The Car	1997	Rajasenan
Ancharakalyanam	1997	V. M. Vinu
Bhoopathi	1998	Joshiy
Punjabi House	1998	Rafi–Mecartin
Sreekrishnapurathe Nakshathrathilakkam	1998	Rajasenan
Oro Viliyum Kathorthu	1998	V. M. Vinu
Sidhartha	1998	Jomon
Manthri Maalikayil Manasammatham	1998	Kalabhavan Ansar
Ormacheppu	1998	A. K. Lohithadas
Pallavur Devanarayanan	1999	V. M. Vinu
Thenkasipattanam	2000	Rafi–Mecartin
One Man Show	2001	Shafi
Akashathile Paravakal	2001	V. M. Vinu
Kanalkireedam	2002	K. Sreekuttan
Kalyanaraman	2002	Shafi
Valathottu Thirinjal Nalamathe Veedu	2003	Kalabhavan Ansar
Choonda	2003	Venugopan
Avarkkay Aruldas	2003	Tesli
Pulival Kalyanam	2003	Shafi
Chathikkatha Chanthu	2004	Rafi–Mecartin
Greetings	2004	Shajun Karyal
Oraal	2005	Kukku Parameshwaran
Pandippada	2005	Rafi–Mecartin
Iruvattam Manavaatti	2005	Vasudev Sanal
Highway Police	2006	Prasad Valacheril
Vadakkumnadhan	2006	Shajun Karyal
Kichamani MBA	2007	Samad Mankada
Veeralipattu	2007	Kukku Surendran
Chocolate	2007	Shafi
Mayavi	2007	Shafi
Lollipop	2008	Shafi
Malayali	2009	C. S. Sudheesh
Love in Singapore	2009	Rafi–Mecartin
Little Master	2012	S. Rajendran
Players	2013	Vasudev Sanal
Nakshathrangal	2014	Raju Chambakkara
Alroopangal	2016	C. V. Premkumar
The Great Indian Road Movie	2019	Sohan Lal

== See also ==
- M. S. Mani (film editor)
- Beena Paul
