= Mappillai Sir =

- Theatrical release poster
- Directed by: D. S. Balagan
- Screenplay by: D. S. Balagan
- Story by: Balachandra Menon
- Produced by: T. Subbulakshmi
- Starring: Visu; Mohan; Rekha
- Cinematography: V. Ramamurthy
- Edited by: Ganesh–Kumar
- Music by: Shankar–Ganesh
- Production company: Lakshmi Raja Films
- Release date: 12 August 1988
- Country: India
- Language: Tamil

Mappillai Sir (transl. Mr. Groom) is a 1988 Indian Tamil-language comedy drama film written and directed by D. S. Balagan from a story by Balachandra Menon. The film stars Visu, Mohan and Rekha. A remake of the 1983 Malayalam film Karyam Nissaram, It was released on 12 August 1988.

== Plot ==
Varadarajan is a trained attorney who does not practice due to a promise he made his father-in-law when he married his wife. They have two daughters. His neighbour is a retired Army Colonel who has health issues and is married to Sumithra. The daughters marry their lovers with their father's consent, despite their mother's disapproval. The story then focuses on their reconciliation.

== Cast ==
- Visu as Varadarajan
- Mohan as the driving master
- Rekha
- Jayanti as Meenakshi
- Kishmu as Colonel
- Dilip as Dilip
- Delhi Ganesh as Rajasingham
- Sethu Vinayagam as Rajasingham son
- Master Suresh as Viji
- Sumithra as Mary
- Manorama as social worker
- Pournami as Tara

== Soundtrack ==
The soundtrack was composed by the duo Shankar–Ganesh, with lyrics by Idhaya Chandran.

Track listing
No.	Title	Singer(s)	Length
1.	"Madi Veettukkoondukkili"	S. P. Balasubrahmanyam
2.	"Daddy...Daddy"	Chithra, Suja Radhakrishnan
3.	"Malligaiye...Malligaiye"	S. P. Balasubrahmanyam
4.	"Kallanalum Kanavanthandi"	Malaysia Vasudevan
5.	"Pattuppoovai Thottupparkka"	S.P. Balasubrahmanyam, Chitra
6.	"Yea! Ittakkaru"	S. P. Sailaja, Chorus

== Release and reception ==
Mappillai Sir was released on 12 August 1988. NKS of The Indian Express wrote, "The Maappillai Saar objective is the taming of the arrogant Jayanthi [...] The taming of the shrew line having exhausted itself midway, the film occupies itself with an assortment of cooked up conflicts". Jayamanmadhan of Kalki criticised the film for its writing, likening it to a car being driven without a brake.
