= April 19 (film) =

1996 Indian Malayalam-language film

- Theatrical release poster
- Directed by: Balachandra Menon
- Written by: Balachandra Menon
- Produced by: Mohan Vettathu
- Starring: Balachandra Menon; Nandini; Jagathy Sreekumar; Shanthi Krishna
- Cinematography: Anandakkuttan
- Edited by: G. Murali
- Music by: Raveendran
- Production company: GVJ Films
- Release date: 19 April 1996
- Country: India
- Language: Malayalam

April 19 is a 1996 Indian Malayalam-language drama film written and directed by Balachandra Menon. The film stars Balachandra Menon and Nandini in lead roles, with supporting performances by Jagathy Sreekumar and Shanthi Krishna. The music was composed by Raveendran.

== Plot ==
Jayaprakash, a man from a modest background, begins his career as a taxi driver and gradually rises through determination and hard work to build a successful business empire in Mumbai. During this journey, he rescues a woman from a dangerous situation and later marries her. However, as his professional commitments grow, he finds himself increasingly unable to devote time to his personal life, leading to strain in his relationship. The film explores themes of ambition, success, and the impact of career-driven choices on personal relationships.

== Cast ==
- Balachandra Menon as Jayaprakash (JP)
- Nandini as Nandini
- Jagathy Sreekumar as Chacko
- Shanthi Krishna as Zeenath Jabbar
- Ratheesh as Jabbar
- Keerthi Gopinath as Mini Nair
- Indrans as Chandran Pillai
- M. S. Thripunithura as Pathmanabhan
- Bindu Panicker as Bhavaniyamma
- Rajkumar

== Production ==
The film marked the acting debut of Kausalya, who was credited as Nandini, in Malayalam cinema.

== Soundtrack ==
The music for the film was composed by Raveendran, with lyrics by S. Ramesan Nair.

No.	Song	Singer(s)	Music	Lyrics
1	"Sharapoli Mala Charthi"	K. J. Yesudas, S. Janaki	Raveendran	S. Ramesan Nair
2	"Arivinumarulinum"	Raveendran, Roshni Mohan	Raveendran	S. Ramesan Nair
3	"Devike Nin Meyyil"	K. J. Yesudas	Raveendran	S. Ramesan Nair
4	"Mazha Peythal"	K. J. Yesudas, S. Janaki	Raveendran	S. Ramesan Nair
5	"Mazha Peythal"	K. J. Yesudas	Raveendran	S. Ramesan Nair

== Marketing ==
The characters used in the film's video cover are from different films but use the same actors: the image of Balachandra Menon is from Sathyameva Jayathe and that of Nandini is from Karumadikkuttan. Menon felt that such practices are disrespectful both to the film itself and the audience that sees itself.

== Legacy ==
In 2007, the screenplays of Balachandra Menon's films April 18 and April 19 were published together in a book titled Randu Thirakkathakal, released by Malayalam poet and lyricist Sreekumaran Thampi. The publication is listed among Menon's literary works in a feature on Malayala Manorama.

Menon has described the two films as thematically contrasting works, with April 18 focusing on youthful aspirations and forward-looking expectations, and April 19 presenting a more reflective narrative centred on the consequences of life choices. In his book, Ithiri Neram Othiri Karyam he documents about working with three generations of Jagathy Sreekumar's family in his book Ithiri Neram Othiri Karyam as he had worked with his father Jagathy N. K. Achary in Najangalude Kochu Doctor. In this film, he had worked both with Jagathy and his son Rajkumar.
