= Krishna Gopalakrishna =

- Directed by: Balachandra Menon
- Written by: Balachandra Menon
- Screenplay by: Balachandra Menon
- Produced by: Krishnan Nair
- Starring: Manoj K. Jayan; Ashokan; Balachandra Menon; Kalpana
- Cinematography: Alagappan
- Edited by: Balachandra Menon
- Music by: Balachandra Menon
- Production companies: KSFDC & V&V
- Distributed by: KSFDC & V&V
- Release date: 26 April 2002
- Country: India
- Language: Malayalam

Krishna Gopalakrishna is a 2002 Indian Malayalam-language film, directed by Balachandra Menon and produced by Krishnan Nair. The film stars Manoj K. Jayan, Ashokan, Balachandra Menon and Kalpana in lead roles. The film had musical score by Balachandra Menon.

== Plot ==
The story is about the life and time of Gopalakrishnan who was born into an ordinary family. His father was a moneylender while his mother was an ardent devotee of Lord Krishna, thus naming her son after him. Gopalakrisknan grows up hearing the stories of Krishna and his ambition was to start a dairy farm. His childhood sweetheart was Radha, but after many reels he marries the wrong girl. After his mother's death he becomes an alcoholic and is neglected by his wife and children. Seeking peace he ends up in an ashram, but soon falls sick and needs an operation. At the hospital he meets his old flame Radha and hopes to recover and live with her in a farm full of cows.

== Cast ==
- Balachandra Menon as Gopalakrishnan
- Kalpana as Sujatha
- Santhosh as Jangathnathan
- Siddique as Moidu Master
- Manoj K. Jayan as Dr. Jacob
- Sreeja Chandran as Radha
- Geetu Mohandas as Gayathri
- Ashokan as Peter
- Indraja as Bhama
- Sreenivasan
- Lal
- Geetha Nair
- Master Vignesh
- Mini Nair
- Poojappura Radhakrishnan
- Valsala Menon

== Soundtrack ==
The music was composed by Balachandra Menon.

No.	Song	Singers	Lyrics	Length (m:ss)
1	"Kallum Mannum Vaarithinnum" (F)	K. S. Chithra	Bichu Thirumala	
2	"Choodulla Kaattin"	Sujatha Mohan, Balachandra Menon	Bichu Thirumala	
3	"Kallum Mannum Vaarithinnum" (M)	K. J. Yesudas	Bichu Thirumala	
4	"Raamayoora Nadana"	K. J. Yesudas	Bichu Thirumala	
5	"Thathakkapithaka" (Neeradum Pennungalude)	Bichu Thirumala, Chorus, Prathibha	Bichu Thirumala	
