= Neethipeedam =

- Directed by: Crossbelt Mani
- Starring: Madhu; Sheela; K. P. Ummer; Maniyanpilla Raju
- Music by: G. Devarajan
- Release date: 3 June 1977
- Country: India
- Language: Malayalam

Neethipeedam is a 1977 Indian Malayalam-language film, directed by Crossbelt Mani. The film stars Madhu, Sheela, K. P. Ummer and Maniyanpilla Raju. The film has musical score by G. Devarajan. The film was a remake of the Tamil film Ezhai Padum Padu.

== Cast ==
- Madhu
- Sheela
- K. P. Ummer
- Maniyanpilla Raju
- Thikkurissy Sukumaran Nair

== Soundtrack ==
The music was composed by G. Devarajan and the lyrics were written by Yusufali Kechery and Bharanikkavu Sivakumar.

No.	Song	Singers	Lyrics	Length (m:ss)
1	"Daivam Manushyanaay"	K. J. Yesudas	Yusufali Kechery	
2	"Poovinu Vannavano"	P. Madhuri	Yusufali Kechery	
3	"Pularkalam"	K. J. Yesudas	Yusufali Kechery	
4	"Viplava Gaayakare"	P. Jayachandran	Bharanikkavu Sivakumar	
