= Ente Ammu Ninte Thulasi Avarude Chakki =

- Official Film Poster
- Directed by: Balachandra Menon
- Written by: Balachandra Menon
- Starring: Balachandra Menon; Venu Nagavalli; Urvashi
- Cinematography: Vipin Mohan
- Edited by: K. P. Hariharaputhran
- Music by: Kannur Rajan
- Production company: Udaya Studios
- Distributed by: Munoth & Vijaya Movies
- Release date: 15 August 1985
- Running time: 137 mins
- Country: India
- Language: Malayalam

Ente Ammu Ninte Thulasi Avarude Chakki is 1985 Malayalam language family drama movie starring Balachandra Menon, Venu Nagavalli and Urvashi in important roles. The film was directed and written by Balachandra Menon.

== Plot ==
S. Nandakumar, a dentist sets a trap for his friend Shakthi who once loved "Thulasi" and left her. Nandakumar invites him to his house for a vacation with him and introduces "Thulasi" as his wife "Ammu". Nandakumar acts as not having knowledge about their relationship and keeps telling him about his wife. He also learns from him that they have a child. Once when Nandakumar went to office "Thulasi" says to him that the child was Shakti's. He revels about all these to Nandakumar and then Nandakumar says all this was his plan to rejoin "Thulasi" with Shakti and that Nandakumar had already married Elsy few years back.

== Cast ==
- Balachandra Menon as Dr. S. Nandakumar Menon
- Venu Nagavalli as Shakthi/Ouseppu/Joseph
- Urvashi as Ammu (as called by Nandakumar) / Thulasi (as called by Shakthi, her lover) / Chakki (as called by her parents)
- Bharath Gopi as Thega Chellappan Pillai, Chakki's father
- Kaviyoor Ponnamma as Sathyabhama, Chakki's mother
- Sankaradi as Vasu Pillai, Chakki's uncle
- Seema as Elsy, Nandakumar's wife
- Thodupuzha Vasanthi as Shakthi's house owner
- Baiju as newspaper boy, Chellappan pilla's worker
- T. P. Madhavan
- Kollam Ajith as Cameo Appearance

== Soundtrack ==
The music was composed by Kannur Rajan and the lyrics were written by O. N. V. Kurup.

No.	Song	Singers	Lyrics	Length (m:ss)
1	"Kochu Chakkarachi Pettu"	Venu Nagavally, Balachandra Menon, Chithrakala	O. N. V. Kurup	
2	"Maanam Poomanam"	K. S. Chithra, Balagopalan Thampi	O. N. V. Kurup	
3	"Nimisham Suvarnna"	K. S. Chithra	O. N. V. Kurup	
4	"Nimisham Suvarnna" (M)	M. G. Sreekumar	O. N. V. Kurup	
