= Tharattu =

- Directed by: Balachandra Menon
- Written by: Balachandra Menon
- Screenplay by: Balachandra Menon
- Produced by: AM Sherif and SM Sheryff
- Starring: Srividya; Nedumudi Venu; Balachandra Menon; Shanthi Krishna
- Cinematography: Vipin Das
- Edited by: G. Venkittaraman
- Music by: Raveendran
- Production company: Ramees Reena Movies
- Distributed by: Ramees Reena Movies
- Release date: 7 October 1981
- Country: India
- Language: Malayalam

Tharattu (transl. Lullaby) is a 1981 Indian Malayalam film, directed by Balachandra Menon and produced by AM Sherif and SM Sheryff. The film stars Srividya, Nedumudi Venu, Balachandra Menon and Shanthi Krishna in the lead roles. The film has musical score by Raveendran.

== Plot ==
The film is set around family of 3 brothers Unni, Venu and Viswanathan and their elder sister Sreedevi, the matriarch of the family. Sreedevi is unmarried and looks after her brothers while working in a private sector firm. Unni is a hard working mechanic who is awaiting a job visa from middle east. Venu is an aspiring ballet artist who loses his job as he is more interested in his drama troupe. Viswanathan is a jobless youngster leeches off his elder siblings and spends his time chasing girls and dancing at the club.

Viswan befriends Dileep a rich youngman with shadowy businesses. Though Dileep claims his rich parents are sending him money, he appears to be handling guns and is involved with criminal gangs. Dileep take liking to Viswam and lavishes him with gifts. Unni and Sreedevi gets worried about Viswam's new relationships. Sridevi clashes with Dileep about it. She even expels Dileep from their home when he visit Vishwam for lunch.

Unni becomes close to Meera, neighbour's granddaughter, but has to leave to Bombay enroute Dubai. Venu falls for Vasantha, heroine of his drama, but she appears to be flirting with many people. During a north Indian tour, Venu catches her red handed with another artist and ends the relationship. He disbands the drama troupe abruptly and return home.

Sreedevi falls ill and loses her sight. The doctor advises an expensive experimental surgery. Meera steps in to take care of Sreedevi. Unni returns home scammed by visa agents, but the family tries to conceal this from Sreedevi initially. Three brothers goes in search for Rs.15,000 required for the surgery, but with no avail until Dileep gives the money to Viswam. Sreedevi regains sight after successful surgery.

Later, a drunk Dileep reveals to Vishwam that he is actually an orphan abandoned in a hospital in Bangalore 23 years ago. As Sreedevi overhears this from Viswam, she realizes that Dileep is her illegitimate son with an old lover who abandoned her after having a baby. She visits Dileep and reveals the truth to him. The family prepares to welcome Dileep. But Dileep gets killed by a criminal rival on his way to meet family.

== Cast ==
- Srividya as Sreedevi
- Maniyanpilla Raju as Viswanathan a.k.a. Viswam
- Nedumudi Venu as Venu
- Rathidevi
- Balachandra Menon as Dileep
- Shanthi Krishna as Meera
- Venu Nagavally as Unni
- Sankaradi
- Kundara Johny as Johny
- Kottarakkara Sreedharan Nair
- Sreerekha
- Janardanan

== Trivia ==
- Nedumudi Venu and Kundara Johny plays characters of their own name. This was typical of Balachandra Menon movies of early 80s
- Srividya plays a woman with illegitimate child. She repeated the role in many films later.

== Soundtrack ==
The music was composed by Raveendran. "Ragangale Mohangale" is set in Hamsadhvani raga.

| No. | Song | Singers | Lyrics | Length (m:ss) |
|---|---|---|---|---|
| 1 | "Aalolam Poomuthe" | P. Susheela | Sasikala Menon | |
| 2 | "Makara Samkrama Sooryodayam" | K. J. Yesudas | Bharanikkavu Sivakumar | |
| 3 | "Poovinullil Poo Viriyum" | K. J. Yesudas | Madhu Alappuzha | |
| 4 | "Ragangale Mohangale" | K. J. Yesudas, S. Janaki | Bharanikkavu Sivakumar | |
