= Karyam Nissaram =

- Theatrical release poster
- Directed by: Balachandra Menon
- Written by: Balachandra Menon
- Produced by: Raju Mathew
- Starring: Prem Nazir; Balachandra Menon; Lakshmi; Poornima Jayaram; K.P. Ummer; Sukumari; Jalaja; Lalu Alex; Baiju
- Cinematography: Anandakuttan
- Edited by: G. Venkitaramanan
- Music by: Songs: Kannur Rajan; Score: Johnson
- Production company: Century Films
- Distributed by: Century Films
- Release date: 8 April 1983
- Country: India
- Language: Malayalam

Karyam Nissaram (English: The Matter is Simple) is a 1983 Indian Malayalam-language drama film produced by Raju Mathew under the banner of Century Films and written and directed by Balachandra Menon. The film stars Prem Nazir and Lakshmi, along with Lalu Alex, Balachandra Menon, Poornima Jayaram, Sukumari, Jalaja, Baiju and K. P. Ummer in supporting roles. It gives us a glimpse into the life of a family during the period when their children marry off. The film explores the concepts of marital life and the impact of trust issues in a relationship.

The film was a blockbuster, running for 200 days. The film has musical score by Johnson and songs by Kannur Rajan. The film was remade in Kannada as En Swamy Aliyandre starring Tiger Prabhakar and Jayashri, in Tamil as Maappillai Sir starring Visu, Mohan, Rekha and Jayanthi and in Telugu as Pellam Chatu Mogudu starring Dasari Narayana Rao.

== Plot ==
The film deals with the small family of Unnithan and Ammini Kutty and their two daughters Parvathi and Sarala. Unnithan is an advocate, but he does not practice law due to his principles. Lekshmi is from a rich family and proud of it. They had a love marriage and now he is a henpecked husband. Sarala falls in love with her Lecturer and marries him. Shekhar is a workshop and a driving school owner. Parvathi goes to his driving school to study driving and falls in love with him. Ammini Kutty opposes their love, but they decided to live together. Unnithan approves, but Ammini Kutty initially can't accept her daughter's decision. Avarachan, as Unnithan's neighbour is an ex-service man who lives with his wife Annie. They are extremely depressed because they have no children. Suddenly Biju appears as Avarachan's illegitimate son, but no one except Unnithan knows it. News of becoming a grandmother brings Ammini Kutty back to Parvathi. Avarachan dies one day. Ammini Kutty become suspicious that Biju is Unnithan's son. This breaks their relationship and they separate. Finally Shekhar takes the initiative to reunite Unnithan and Ammini Kutty.

== Cast ==
- Prem Nazir as Unnithan
- Balachandra Menon as Shekhar (Driving school teacher)
- Lakshmi as Manikyamangalathu Amminikutty
- Poornima jayaram as Parvathi
- Jalaja as Sarala
- Lalu Alex as Sarala's husband (Lecturer)
- K. P. Ummer as Retd. Lieutenant Colonel Avarachan
- Sukumari as Annie
- Baiju as Biju

== Soundtrack ==
The songs were composed by Kannur Rajan and the lyrics were written by Konniyoor Bhas.

No.	Song	Singers	Lyrics	Length (m:ss)
1	"Kanmani Penmaniye" (M)	K. J. Yesudas	Konniyoor Bhas	
2	"Kanmani Penmaniye" (F)	Sujatha Mohan	Konniyoor Bhas	
3	"Konchi Ninna Panchamiyo"	S. Janaki	Konniyoor Bhas	
4	"Thaalam Shruthilaya Thaalam"	K. J. Yesudas, S. Janaki	Konniyoor Bhas	
