= Arante Mulla Kochu Mulla =

- Poster
- Directed by: Balachandra Menon
- Written by: Balachandra Menon
- Starring: Balachandra Menon; Shankar; Rohini; Srividya; Laksmi
- Cinematography: Jayanan Vincent
- Edited by: K. P. Hariharaputhran
- Music by: Alleppey Ranganath; Johnson(Background)
- Release date: 9 October 1984
- Running time: 125 minutes
- Country: India
- Language: Malayalam

Arante Mulla Kochu Mulla is a Malayalam family film, directed by Balachandra Menon, starring Balachandra Menon, Shankar, Srividya, and Laksmi. The film is noted for the performances of the late Srividya and Laksmi, who portray sisters-in-law.

== Plot ==
Sisters-by-marriage Maheswariyamma and Thankamani Kunjamma, though feigning mutual affection, are in fact bitter rivals: when the rich, handsome bank manager Omanakuttan arrives in town, they both plot alliances between him and their respective daughters, Kavitha and Bindu. The arrival of another stranger, Prabhakaran, transforms the story.

== Cast ==
- Balachandra Menon as Prabhakaran/Anaadhan
- Shankar as Bank Manager Omanakkuttan
- Rohini as Rohini
- Srividya as Thankamani Kunjamma
- Lakshmi as Maheswariyamma
- Lissy as Bindu (Maheswariyamma's daughter)
- Sabitha Anand as Kavitha (Thankamani Kunjamma's daughter)
- Venu Nagavalli as Accountant Joy
- M. G. Soman as Panchayath President
- Thilakan as Member Bhargavan Pillai
- Maniyan Pillai Raju as Rajappan
- Sankaradi as Former Bank Manager
- P. K. Abraham as Priest
- T. P. Madhavan
- Sukumari

== Soundtrack ==
The music was composed by Alleppey Ranganath and the lyrics were written by Madhu Alappuzha.

No.	Song	Singers	Lyrics	Length (m:ss)
1	"Kaattil Kodum Kaattil"	K. J. Yesudas, K. S. Chithra	Madhu Alappuzha	
2	"Ponthaamarakal Poothulayum"	K. J. Yesudas, K. S. Chithra	Madhu Alappuzha	
3	"Shaaleena Soundaryame"	K. J. Yesudas, Chorus	Madhu Alappuzha	

== view the film ==
- arante mulla kochumulla
