= Kandathum Kettathum =

- Directed by: Balachandra Menon
- Written by: Balachandra Menon
- Screenplay by: Balachandra Menon
- Produced by: Bhavana
- Starring: Balachandra Menon; Baiju; Thilakan; Mala Aravindan; Usha
- Cinematography: Santosh Sivan
- Edited by: G. Venkittaraman
- Production company: Bhavana Arts
- Distributed by: Bhavana Arts
- Release date: 15 January 1988
- Country: India
- Language: Malayalam
- Budget: ₹15 lakh (US$18,000)

Kandathum Kettathum (English: What was seen and heard) is a 1988 Indian Malayalam-language film, directed by Balachandra Menon. The film stars Balachandra Menon, Baiju, Thilakan, Mala Aravindan and Usha in the lead roles. The film, made at a production cost of ₹15 lakh.

== Plot ==
Krishnankutty, an educated young man, launches a studio but is betrayed by his partner Sadhanandhan and struggles to make ends meet. Out of desperation, he decides to end his financial woes with a drastic step.

== Cast ==
- Balachandra Menon as Krishnankutty P. K.
- Usha as Muthulekshmi
- Baiju as Ganeshan
- Thilakan as Owner of Minnal Vaarika
- Mala Aravindan as Flash Studio owner Sadanandan
- Adoor Pankajam
- Alummoodan as R. Kesava Pillai, Krishnankutty's father
- K. P. A. C. Sunny as Circle Inspector of Police
- Chandraji
- Jagadish as Varghese
- Kochaniyan
- Kollam Thulasi as Security guard Narayanan
- Meena as building rental Mrs. Padmanabhan
- Kanakalatha as Krishnankutty's sister
- P. C. Soman
- Poojappura Radhakrishnan
- Rudraprathap
