= De Ingottu Nokkiye =

- Moserbaer CD of the film
- Directed by: Balachandra Menon
- Written by: Balachandra Menon
- Produced by: A.V.Anoop
- Starring: Jayasurya; Jagathy Sreekumar; Sara Alambara; Rathish Rajan
- Cinematography: Jibu Jacob
- Edited by: Bhoominathan
- Music by: M. Jayachandran
- Release date: 17 April 2008
- Country: India
- Language: Malayalam

De Ingottu Nokkiye is a 2008 Indian Malayalam film by Balachandra Menon starring Jayasurya, Jagathy Sreekumar, Rathish Rajan and Sara. The film was released to negative reviews.

== Plot ==
The film is about Vettikadu Sivan, a young, intelligent man who sets out on a mission to settle a score and give a piece of his mind to his uncle Vettikadu Sadasivan who is the chief minister of the state.

To do this, Sivan hatches a plan to get the twin brother of Sadasivan who is settled in Gujarat and is an ordinary banana seller and a bit on the lesser side of intelligence.

Sivan gets the banana seller to his state, valiantly kidnaps the real chief minister with the support of his friends, and puts the duplicate in his place. From then on, he keeps guiding the dummy chief minister at all points and the dummy is busy trying to locate his lost love Ammu whom he has adored for a long time.

== Cast ==
- Jayasurya as Vettikkadu Shivan
- Sara Alambara
- Jagathy Sreekumar as Vettikkadu Sadashivan
- Balachandra Menon as Joji
- Thilakan as K.P.S Kartha
- Janardhanan
- Nedumudi Venu
- Bharath Gopi
- Lena as Julia
- Idavela Babu
- Mala Aravindan as Cleetus
- Rathish Rajan
- Yadhu Krishnan
- Hareesh Peradi
- Kaviyoor Ponnamma as Muthassi
- Sukumari as Ammu
- Indrans as Vettikkadu Sugunan
- Kollam Thulasi
- Kalpana
- M. R. Gopakumar
- Renuka

== Soundtrack ==
The soundtrack of the film was composed by M. Jayachandran and lyrics were by Gireesh Puthenchery. The songs are sung by Jassie Gift and Sangeethaa-Sangeetha Sajith.
