= Thaaiku Oru Thaalaattu =

- Theatrical release poster
- Directed by: Balachandra Menon
- Written by: Vijay Krishnaraj (dialogues)
- Story by: Balachandra Menon
- Produced by: K. R. Gangadharan
- Starring: Sivaji Ganesan; Padmini; Visu; Pandiarajan; Rajyalakshmi; Rohini
- Cinematography: Jayanan Vincent
- Edited by: K. P. Puthran
- Music by: Ilaiyaraaja
- Production company: KRG Film Circuit
- Distributed by: KRG Film Circuit
- Release date: 16 July 1986
- Country: India
- Language: Tamil

Thaaiku Oru Thaalaattu (transl. Lullaby to the mother) is a 1986 Indian Tamil-language drama film, directed by Balachandra Menon in his Tamil debut and produced by K. R. Gangadharan. The film stars Sivaji Ganesan, Padmini, Visu and Pandiarajan. It was released on 16 July 1986. The film was a remake of the director's own Malayalam film Oru Painkilikatha.

== Plot ==
Rich industrialist Rajasekar is a loving husband to Dhanam and father to three children. Their oldest son is a Collector and married to a successful managing director of a company. Their youngest, Manju, is a brilliant college student aiming to become a doctor. Their middle child is the unambitious Kannan who couldn't succeed academically and is now working as a labourer in his father's factory. Rajasekar, though he loves his son, is also bitterly disappointed in Kannan and keeps him at an emotional distance. He hopes by withholding affection, he can spur Kannan into becoming more ambitious and successful in life. Dhanam, on the other hand, appreciates that Kannan is kind, funny and considerate of others. She showers him with affection and tries to bridge the divide between father and son. Kannan learns that Manju is in love with fellow college student Ramesh and is supportive. When Rajasekar arranges Manju's marriage to Kumar, Kannan objects. However, Manju is too intimidated to go against her strict father and sacrifices her love to marry Kumar. Kannan's own love affair with the maid, Chellakili comes to light when she becomes pregnant. Unlike Manju, Kannan chooses love despite his father's displeasure at his actions. He and Chellakili marry and move out with the help of family friend, Ponnambalam.

Although he left the family home, Kannan is still desperate for his father's love and approval. Pakkiri, a fellow worker at the factory who's looking to stir up trouble, senses Kannan's desperation and convinces him to join the union. Father and son clash when the workers agitate for better conditions. Padmavathi, a labour relations officer, is called in to mediate. Rajasekar is perturbed as he once knew Padmavathi before his marriage. Padmavathi grows closer to Kannan and Chellakili as Rajasekar continues to take a strict stand with his son. A family tragedy brings matters to a head, forcing Rajasekar to re-evaluate his priorities.

== Cast ==
- Sivaji Ganesan as Rajasekar
- Padmini as Dhanam
- Sujatha as Padmavathi
- Pandiarajan as Kannan
- Rohini as Chellakili
- Visu as Ponnambalam
- Vijay Krishnaraj as Pakkiri
- Ilavarasi as Manju
- Vijayakumar as Kumar
- Pandiyan as Ramesh
- Nizhalgal Ravi as Shankar
- Rajyalakshmi as Geetha

== Production ==
The film marked the directorial debut of Balachandra Menon in Tamil cinema. The film saw Sivaji Ganesan and Padmini pairing after a long time after Iru Dhuruvam (1970).

== Soundtrack ==
The music was composed by Ilaiyaraaja, with lyrics by Vairamuthu.

Song	Singers	Length
"Aalaiyilla Piranthaval"	Ilaiyaraaja, Malaysia Vasudevan, P. Susheela	06:08
"Aarariroo"	K. J. Yesudas	04:25
"Ilamai Kaalam"	T. M. Soundararajan, P. Susheela	04:35
"Kadhala Kadhala"	Ilaiyaraaja, K. S. Chithra	04:41
"Thanni Thavikuthu"	S. P. Balasubrahmanyam, S. Janaki	04:23

== Critical reception ==
Jayamanmadhan of Kalki felt the film starts without a goal and continues without a goal, adding that the climax also ends tamely.
