= Dheivatheyorthu =

- Directed by: R. Gopi
- Written by: Balachandra Menon; Venu Nagavally (dialogues)
- Screenplay by: Venu Nagavally
- Starring: Prem Nazir; Srividya; Innocent; Urvashi
- Cinematography: Ramachandra Babu
- Edited by: K. P. Hariharaputhran
- Music by: M. G. Radhakrishnan
- Production company: Beejees
- Distributed by: Beejees
- Release date: 21 December 1985
- Country: India
- Language: Malayalam

Dheivatheyorthu (transl. For God's sake) is a 1985 Indian Malayalam film, directed by R. Gopi. The film stars Balachandra Menon, Prem Nazir, Srividya, Innocent and Urvashi in the lead roles. The film has a musical score by M. G. Radhakrishnan.

== Cast ==
Some notable cast members of Dheivatheyorthu are as follows:

- Prem Nazir
- Srividya as Rukmini
- Innocent
- Urvashi as Nani
- Balachandra Menon as Achuthankuttu
- Sankaradi
- Santhosh as Shaji
- Baiju
- Kottarakkara Sreedharan Nair
- Kottayam Valsalan
- Santha Devi

== Soundtrack ==
The music was composed by M. G. Radhakrishnan and the lyrics were written by Kavalam Narayana Panicker.

No.	Song	Singers	Lyrics	Length (m:ss)
1	"Kakka Kakka Kaavathi Kaakke"	P. Jayachandran, Kala Devi V.S.	Kavalam Narayana Panicker	
2	"Kuttichaathi"	M. G. Sreekumar, Chithrakala	Kavalam Narayana Panicker	
3	"Moovanthipponnambalathin"	P. Jayachandran, Chorus	Kavalam Narayana Panicker	
4	"Ullam Minni Vallam Thenni Thenni"	M. G. Sreekumar	Kavalam Narayana Panicker	
