= Pazhavila Rameshan =

Indian journalist, poet, and lyricist (1936–2019)

Pazhavila Ramesan
- Born: 30 March 1936; Perinad, Kollam, Kerala, India
- Died: 13 June 2019 (aged 83)
- Occupations: Poet, Journalist, Lyricist

Pazhavila Ramesan (30 March 1936 – 13 June 2019) was a Malayalam–language journalist, poet and lyricist from Kerala, India, who received the 2017 Kerala Sahitya Akademi Award for Overall Contributions.

== Biography ==
From 1961 to 1968 he was the co-editor of K. Balakrishnan's Kaumudi Weekly. He worked as the Director of Kerala Bhasha Institute (State Institute of Languages). His literary works include Pazhavila Rameshante Kavithakal, Mazhayude Jalakom and Njan Ente Kadukalilekk (poetry collections); Ormayude Varthamanam, Mayatha Varakal and Nervara (essays). He wrote lyrics for a few Malayalam film songs including those from the films Njattadi (1979), Aashamsakalode (1984), Uncle Bun (1991), Malootty (1992) and Vasudha (1992).

== Death ==
Pazhavila Ramesan died in Thiruvananthapuram, Kerala on 13 June 2019, following a time of illness.
