= Manicheppu Thurannappol =

- Poster
- Directed by: Balachandra Menon
- Written by: Balachandra Menon
- Produced by: Babu Xavier
- Starring: Sukumari; Thilakan; Balachandra Menon; Karthika
- Cinematography: Jayanan Vincent
- Edited by: K. P. Hariharaputhran
- Music by: Darsan Raman; Lyrics: Bichu Thirumala
- Production company: Vijaya Movies
- Release date: 25 March 1985
- Country: India
- Language: Malayalam

Manicheppu Thurannappol is a 1985 Indian Malayalam film, directed by Balachandra Menon and produced by Babu Savior. The film stars Sukumari, Thilakan, Balachandra Menon and Karthika (in her leading debut) in the lead roles. The film has musical score by Darsan Raman.

== Cast ==
- Sukumari
- Thilakan
- Balachandra Menon
- Jalaja
- Karthika

== Soundtrack ==
The music was composed by Darsan Raman.

No.	Song	Singers	Lyrics	Length (m:ss)
1	"Swargavaathil Thurannu"	Kamukara, Balagopalan Thampi, Janakidevi, Sindhu	Bichu Thirumala	
2	"Swargavaathil Thurannu" (Pathinezhu Valsarangal)	K. J. Yesudas, Janakidevi	Bichu Thirumala	
