= Vilambaram (1987 film) =

- Directed by: Balachandra Menon
- Written by: Balachandra Menon
- Screenplay by: Balachandra Menon
- Produced by: K. G. Rajagopal
- Starring: Balachandra Menon; Ambika; Saritha; Sukumari; Thilakan; Ashokan
- Cinematography: Anandakuttan
- Edited by: K. P. Hariharaputhran
- Music by: S. P. Venkatesh
- Production company: GR International
- Distributed by: GR International
- Release date: 12 February 1987
- Country: India
- Language: Malayalam

Vilambaram is a 1987 Indian Malayalam film, directed by Balachandra Menon and produced by K. G. Rajagopal. The film stars Balachandra Menon, Ambika, Saritha, Sukumari, Thilakan, Ashokan and Shari in the lead roles. The film has musical score by S. P. Venkatesh and lyrics by P. Bhaskaran.

== Cast ==
- Balachandra Menon as Advocate P. K. Namboothiri
- Ambika as Sheela
- M. G. Soman as Balagopalan
- Saritha as Sunanda Balagopalan
- Shari as Valsala
- Sukumari as Mary
- Thilakan as James
- Ashokan as Basheer
- Sankaradi as Judge
- Baiju as Hotel Boy
- Jalaja as Razeena

== Plot ==
Balagopalan (Soman) is a wealthy entrepreneur whose wife Sunanda (Saritha), is a wheelchair bound paraplegic.

He is a profligate spender and drunken womanizer who sleeps with prostitutes procured by his friend James (Thilakan),and he lies to Sunanda about his whereabouts. Balagopalan's chauffeur, Bashir (Ashokan), advises him to not be so profligate and receives a slap from Balagopalan for his trouble. The next night, Balagopalan offers money to Bashir to compensate him for the slap, which Bashir graciously refuses.

Sunanda finds a new young stenographer Valsala (Shari) for her husband. Balagopalan finds Valsala attractive and looks to proposition her. Sunanda appoints Valsala as her house companion relieving her of her steno duties.

Valsala and Bashir grow fond of each other, but Balagopalan makes a pass at Valsala in the house that she resists. Sunanda becomes aware of this, and is heartbroken but offers out of shame of her own disabled condition to convince Valsala to sleep with Balagopalan just as long as it's not in their home.

Valsala refuses. She loses her job. And then she is found dead after committing suicide.

Bashir who loved her, becomes suspicious that Balagopalan may have raped her. He gets fired. He approaches Sheela (Ambika), a prominent Police prosecutor to bring a case.

Valsala's exhumed body shows signs of sexual penetration and resistance and the case is brought against Balagopalan for rape.

Despite some initially great headway, Sheela meets strong resistance in court from the tricky Advocate Namboothiri (Balachandra Menon) who extracts large sums from Balagopalan for his services. It comes out in Court that Balagopalan had raped Sheela in the past.

Adv Namboothiri is attracted to Sheela. Through his schemes he gets evidence that James had raped Valsala and thus exonerates Balagopalan.

Balagopalan breaks his friendship with James and Bashir murders James and confesses to it.

== Soundtrack ==
The music was composed by S. P. Venkatesh.

No.	Song	Singers	Lyrics	Length (m:ss)
1	"Enthaanandam"	G. Venugopal, Janakidevi	P. Bhaskaran	
2	"Thaarakale Ambiliye"	Janakidevi, Sindhu Premkumar, Kala	P. Bhaskaran	
