= Oru Painkilikatha =

- Directed by: Balachandra Menon
- Written by: Balachandra Menon
- Produced by: Varada Balachandra Menon
- Starring: Madhu; Srividya; Balachandra Menon; Rohini
- Cinematography: Vipin Mohan
- Edited by: K. P. Hariharaputhran
- Music by: A. T. Ummer; Lyrics: Bichu Thirumala
- Production companies: V&V Productions
- Distributed by: V&V Productions
- Release date: 4 September 1984
- Country: India
- Language: Malayalam

Oru Painkilikatha is a 1984 Indian Malayalam-language film, directed by Balachandra Menon and produced by Varada Balachandra Menon. The film stars Madhu, Srividya, Balachandra Menon and Rohini in the lead roles. The film has musical score by A. T. Ummer. The film was remade in Tamil as Thaiku Oru Thalattu and in Telugu as Samsaram.

== Cast ==
- Madhu as Madhavankutty
- Srividya as Rajeswari
- Balachandra Menon as Kannan
- Rohini as Vilasini
- Kaviyoor Ponnamma as Ponnu / kamalaakshi
- Venu Nagavally as Gopi
- Bharath Gopi as Swami
- Kundara Johnny as Nandakumar I.A.S
- Manochithra as Rani
- Uma Bharani as Thankam

== Soundtrack ==
The music was composed by A. T. Ummer.

No.	Song	Singers	Lyrics	Length (m:ss)
1	"Aanakoduthaalum"	Srividya, Balachandra Menon	Bichu Thirumala	
2	"Ennenneykkumaay"	Venu Nagavally	Bichu Thirumala	
3	"Painkiliye"	Venu Nagavally, Janakidevi, Sindhu, Bharath Gopi	Bichu Thirumala	
