= Chiriyo Chiri =

- Directed by: Balachandra Menon
- Written by: Balachandra Menon
- Screenplay by: Balachandra Menon
- Produced by: P. V. Gangadharan
- Starring: Balachandra Menon; Kaviyoor Ponnamma; Adoor Bhasi; Maniyanpilla Raju
- Cinematography: Vipin Das
- Edited by: G. Venkittaraman
- Music by: Raveendran
- Production company: Grihalakshmi Productions
- Distributed by: Grihalakshmi Productions
- Release date: 24 December 1982
- Country: India
- Language: Malayalam

Chiriyo Chiri is a 1982 Indian Malayalam-language film, directed by Balachandra Menon and produced by P. V. Gangadharan. The film stars Balachandra Menon, Kaviyoor Ponnamma, Adoor Bhasi and Maniyanpilla Raju . The film has musical score by Raveendran. Art direction by Kalalayam Ravi.

== Cast ==
- Balachandra Menon as Unnikrishnan
- Maniyanpilla Raju as Pushkaran
- Swapna as Sethubai Thampuraatti
- Kaviyoor Ponnamma
- Sankaradi as Shankaranarayanan
- Adoor Bhasi as Swami/Guruji
- Shubha
- Sreenivasan as film industry professional
- Adoor Bhavani as Ammumma
- Baby Ponnambili
- Balan K. Nair as Abdul Rasaq
- Kunjandi
- K. T. C. Abdulla as shopkeeper / beedi seller
- Krishna Kurup
- Mammootty as extended cameo appearance
- Nithya
- Seema as extended cameo appearance
- Sukumari as extended cameo appearance
- Paravoor Bharathan as Seth at railway station
- Nanditha Bose

== Soundtrack ==
The lyrics were written by Bichu Thirumala and the music was composed by Raveendran. The song Ezhu Swarangalum sung by K. J. Yesudas is an evergreen hit. It is one of the best songs of Raveendran.

| No. | Song | Singers | Lyrics | Length (mm:ss) |
|---|---|---|---|---|
| 1 | "Ezhu Swarangalum" | K. J. Yesudas | Bichu Thirumala | 05:10 |
| 2 | "Ithu Vareyee Kochu" | K. J. Yesudas | Bichu Thirumala | 04:42 |
| 3 | "Kokkaamandi" | K. J. Yesudas, S. Janaki | Bichu Thirumala | 03:39 |
| 4 | "Oshaakali" (Bit) | Sankaradi | Traditional | |
| 5 | "Palathum Paranju" (Bit) | Kaviyoor Ponnamma | Thunchathezhuthachan | |
| 6 | "Samaya Radhangalil" | K. J. Yesudas, P. Jayachandran | Bichu Thirumala | 04:36 |

== see the movie ==
- chiriyo chiri
