= Maniyan Pilla Adhava Maniyan Pilla =

- Poster
- Directed by: Balachandra Menon
- Written by: Balachandra Menon
- Screenplay by: Balachandra Menon
- Produced by: E. J. Peter
- Starring: Maniyanpilla Raju; Venu Nagavally; Jose Prakash; Ambika
- Cinematography: Ramachandra Babu
- Edited by: G. Venkittaraman
- Music by: G. Devarajan
- Production company: St. Martin Films
- Distributed by: St. Martin Films
- Release date: 1 May 1981
- Country: India
- Language: Malayalam

Maniyan Pilla Adhava Maniyan Pilla is a 1981 Indian Malayalam-language comedy film written, directed and scripted by Balachandra Menon. The film stars Sudheer Kumar (Maniyanpilla Raju), Venu Nagavally, Jose Prakash and Ambika. The film revolves around Maniyanpilla, an illiterate man from a poor household, who goes to the city to make a living. The film was produced and distributed by E. J. Peter under the banner of St. Martin Films. The producer had signed Kamal Haasan for the film as the lead actor, but due to circumstances, Menon replaced Haasan with his real life friend Sudheer Kumar as the lead actor. The film has a musical score by G. Devarajan. The cinematography was handled by Ramachandra Babu. The film was released on 1 May 1981 and was a commercial success and was a breakthrough for Sudheer Kumar, who adopted the hypocorism Maniyanpilla Raju after the success of the film.

== Premise ==
An innocent, illiterate man from a poor family gets a job in an urban bungalow where he finds the people vile. He has to face a lot of obstacles in the wicked world.

== Cast ==
- Maniyanpilla Raju as Maniyan Pilla
- Venu Nagavally as Rahim
- Jose Prakash
- Ambika
- Nanditha Bose
- Nithya
- Sankaradi
- Adoor Bhavani
- Balachandra Menon
- P. A. Latheef
- Jayashree
- Kaviyoor Ponnamma

== Soundtrack ==
The music was composed by G. Devarajan.

No.	Song	Singers	Lyrics	Length (m:ss)
1	"Aruthe Aruthe Enne Thallaruthe"	P. Madhuri, Krishnachandran	Poovachal Khader	
2	"Manjurukunnu Manassil"	K. J. Yesudas	Poovachal Khader	
3	"Mayilaanchiyaninju"	P. Madhuri	Poovachal Khader	
4	"Rajakumari Premakumari"	K. J. Yesudas	Poovachal Khader	
