= Hello My Dear Wrong Number =

- Directed by: Priyadarshan
- Screenplay by: Sreenivasan
- Story by: Priyadarshan
- Based on: Hanky Panky by Sidney Poitier
- Produced by: Tripthi Arts
- Starring: Mohanlal; Maniyanpilla Raju; Lizy; Jagathy Sreekumar; Menaka
- Cinematography: S. Kumar
- Edited by: N. Gopalakrishnan
- Music by: Reghu Kumar; Score: K. J. Joy
- Production company: Thripthi Arts
- Distributed by: Gandhimathi Films
- Release date: 11 April 1986
- Running time: 130 minutes
- Country: India
- Language: Malayalam
- Budget: ₹ 2.15 lakhs

Hello My Dear Wrong Number is a 1986 Indian Malayalam-language comedy thriller film directed by Priyadarshan and written by Sreenivasan from a story by Priyadarshan. It was a remake of the 1982 film Hanky Panky by Sidney Poitier. The film stars Mohanlal, Maniyanpilla Raju, Jagathy Sreekumar, Lissy and Menaka, with Mukesh in a guest appearance.

== Plot ==
Venugopal is a medical representative, an innocent young man who likes being around women and boasting about him to impress them. One day after his job, he decides to watch a movie and while heading towards the theatre in a taxi, a beautiful young lady stops the car and requests him to drop her at a nearby hotel. Enchanted by the beauty of the girl, he agrees to drop her as well as agree to post a letter she wrote on the way. Since the lady looked perplexed and confused and in a hurry there wasn't much of a conversation taking place even though Venugopal tries hard.

Later he goes to the movie and walks into the restroom during the break and gets badly beaten up by certain goons demanding the "letter“ and takes him to the boss's place where he is asked to reveal the address, the letter was posted to. Venugopal fails to give an answer, as he doesn't even remember the address.

Next day he goes to the guy's place with Minnal Babu, a police officer to lodge a complaint and is shocked to see that the entire chain of events is manipulated against him. He rushes to the hotel where he had dropped the lady the other day to find what's going on, only find her dead body falling on him as he opens the room door.

Then starts the game where he is framed for crimes he hasn't committed.

== Cast ==
- Mohanlal as Venugopal, medical representative
- Lissy as Sunitha Menon / Annie Abraham, Venugopal's love interest
- Maniyanpilla Raju as Ramadasan
- Menaka as Shobha, Venugopal's sister
- Jagannatha Varma as Udayavarma, diamond merchant
- C. I. Paul as Police Commissioner Sathyanathan
- Jagathi Sreekumar as Minnal Babu, Crime Branch DySP
- Sreenath as SI Rajagopal, police Sub-Inspector
- Mukesh as Jacob, a murdered diamond thief
- Ragini as Sridevi, Jacob's accomplice and lover
- Captain Raju as David Antony Fernandez, criminal mastermind
- Sreenivasan as Priest Andrews
- Sankaradi as Judge Narayanan Kurup
- James as Chacko
- Sukumari as Forensic officer
- Bob Christo as Roger, David Antony Fernandez's assistant
- Shivaji as Jayan
- Zeenath
- Kothuku Nanappan as Hypnotherapist
- Sulakshana
- Disco Shanti
- Fazil (Cameo appearance)
- P.A Latheef

== Soundtrack ==
The music was composed by Raghu Kumar and the lyrics were written by S. Ramesan Nair.

No.	Song	Singers	Lyrics	Length (m:ss)
1	"Nee Nee Neeyente Jeevan"	K. S. Chithra, M. G. Sreekumar	S. Ramesan Nair	
2	"Neeyen Kinaavo"	K. J. Yesudas, K. S. Chithra	S. Ramesan Nair	
