= Kuruppinte Kanakku Pustakom =

Kuruppinte Kanakkupusthakam
- Directed by: Balachandra Menon
- Written by: Balachandra Menon
- Screenplay by: Balachandra Menon
- Produced by: Varada Balachandra Menon
- Starring: Balachandra Menon; Jayaram; Geetha; Parvathy Jayaram
- Cinematography: Jayanan Vincent
- Edited by: Balachandra Menon
- Music by: Balachandra Menon
- Production companies: V&V Productions
- Distributed by: V&V Productions
- Release date: 25 October 1990
- Country: India
- Language: Malayalam

Kuruppinte Kanakkupusthakam (transl. Kurup's ledger) is a 1990 family-drama Indian Malayalam film, directed by Balachandra Menon and produced by his wife Varada Balachandra Menon. The film stars Balachandra Menon, Jayaram, Geetha and Parvathy Jayaram in the lead roles. The film has musical score by Balachandra Menon.

== Plot ==
It is the story of a strict brother who has made himself a business magnate and is very much into everyone's life around him. He has certain moral attitudes and stubbornness, but the softness and the child inside him is seen by no one, and to an extent he does not show it.

== Cast ==
- Balachandra Menon as Vinayachandra Kurup
- Jayaram as Shanthan
- Geetha as Vasantha
- Parvathy Jayaram as Beena
- Monisha as Sathi
- Kaviyoor Ponnamma as Vinayan, Shanthan and Sathi's mother
- Sankaradi as Vasantha's father
- Sukumari as Vasantha's mother
- Oduvil Unnikrishnan as Gangadharan
- Thikkurissy
- Janardhanan as Beena's brother-in-law
- Mamukkoya as Ali Khan
- Sai Kumar as Girish
- Thodupuzha Vasanthi as Servant

== Soundtrack ==
The music was composed by Balachandra Menon.

No.	Song	Singers	Lyrics	Length (m:ss)
1	"Edan Thaazhvarayil"	K. S. Chithra, P. Jayachandran, Chorus	S. Ramesan Nair	
2	"Pedamaan Kannee"	P. Jayachandran	S. Ramesan Nair	
3	"Pularivannu"	P. Susheela	S. Ramesan Nair	
4	"Theeyum Kaattum Pole"	S. Janaki, Unni Menon	S. Ramesan Nair	
