= Vasudha =

- Directed by: U. V. Babu
- Written by: V. P. B. Nair
- Produced by: SNM Pictures
- Starring: Innocent; Rekha; Rajan P. Dev; Maniyanpilla Raju
- Cinematography: B. Kannan
- Music by: Perumbavoor G. Raveendranath
- Production company: SNM Pictures
- Distributed by: SNM Pictures
- Release date: 1992
- Country: India
- Language: Malayalam

Vasudha is a 1992 Indian Malayalam film, directed by U. V. Babu and produced by SNM Pictures. The film stars Innocent, Rekha, Rajan P. Dev and Maniyanpilla Raju in the lead roles. The film has musical score by Perumbavoor G. Raveendranath.

== Cast ==
- Innocent
- Rekha
- Rajan P. Dev
- Maniyanpilla Raju
- Charuhasan
- Kakka Ravi
- Kanaka
- Sai Kumar
- Silk Smitha

== Soundtrack ==
The music was composed by Perumbavoor G. Raveendranath.

No.	Song	Singers	Lyrics	Length (m:ss)
1	"Alakkozhinja Neramundo"	M. Jayachandran, Ranjini Menon	Pazhavila Rameshan	
2	"Padmanabha Paahi"	K. S. Chithra	Pazhavila Rameshan	
3	"Thaazhampoo"	K. S. Chithra, M. Jayachandran	Pazhavila Rameshan	
4	"Vasudhe"	M. Jayachandran	Pazhavila Rameshan	
5	"Vrindaavana Geetham"	K. S. Chithra	Pazhavila Rameshan	
