= Maniyanpilla Raju =

Indian actor and producer

- Born: Sudheer Kumar; 20 April 1955 (age 71); Thycaud, Thiruvananthapuram, India
- Education: M.G.R. Government Film and Television Training Institute
- Occupations: Actor; Film producer
- Years active: 1976–present
- Spouse: Indira
- Children: 2, including Niranj
- Parents: Shekharan Nair; Saraswati Amma

Sudheer Kumar (born 20 April 1955), better known by his stage name Maniyanpilla Raju (Malayalam: മണിയൻപിള്ള രാജു), is an Indian actor and producer who works in Malayalam film industry. His debut film was Mohiniyaattam in 1976. He has played a variety of roles as a character actor, appearing in over 400 films. His stage name was derived from the character he played in the film Maniyanpilla Adhava Maniyanpilla (1981), his break-through role.

== Early life ==
Raju was born as the youngest among four in 1955 to Shekharan Nair and Saraswati Amma at Thycaud, Thiruvanathapuram. He has two sisters, Ramani and Radha, and a brother Surendran. He had his primary education from Government Model Boys Higher Secondary School, Thiruvanathapuram. He did his pre-degree in Victory Tutorial College. He learned acting through a diploma course during 1973–1975 from Adyar Film Institute, Madras (now Chennai).

== Personal life ==
Maniyanpilla Raju married Indira in 1985, and the couple have two sons, Sachin and Niranj. The younger son, Niranj, made his debut in Renjith's Black Butterfly. He wrote a book titled Chirichum Chirippichum containing his memoirs in 2012. In 2019, he opened a restaurant, Be@Kiwizo, in Kannur, which is Kerala's first restaurant to use robots to serve customers.

== Filmography ==
=== As an actor ===
==== 1970s ====
Year	Title	Role	Notes
1976	Mohiniyaattam	Job hunter	
1976	Light House	Thankamma's brother	
1976	Chirikkudukka		
1977	Neethipeedam		
1977	Aval Oru Devaalayam		
1978	Mudramothiram	Kuttappan	
1978	Jayikkaanaay Janichavan	Tharakan's sidekick	
1978	Kanalkattakal	Man at mental hospital	
1978	Kanyaka		
1978	Mattoru Karnan		
1978	Thiranottam		
1978	Aaravam		
1979	Maalika Paniyunnavar	Ouseph	

==== 1980s ====
Year	Title	Role	Notes
1980	Theenalangal	Appu	
1980	Chamaram	Raju	
1981	Chamayam		
1981	Theekkali		
1981	Maniyan Pilla Adhava Maniyan Pilla	Maniyan Pilla	
1981	Tharattu	Viswanathan	
1982	Football	Shivankutty	
1982	Ithu Njangalude Katha	Santhosh	
1982	Ithiri Neram Othiri Karyam	Raghu	
1982	Bheeman		
1982	Kattile Pattu	Raju	
1982	Aasha	Sunil Kumar	
1982	Chiriyo Chiri	Santhosh	
1983	Prem Nazirine Kanmanilla	Kidnapper	
1983	Prasnam Gurutharam	Raju	
1983	Oru Madapravinte Katha		
1983	Mortuary	Jacob	
1983	Sesham Kazhchayil		
1983	Pinnilavu	Sreedharan	
1983	Koodevide	Shankar	
1984	Onnanu Nammal	Hari	
1984	Thathamme Poocha Poocha		
1984	April 18		
1984	Theere Pratheekshikkathe		
1984	Koottinilamkili	Gopan	
1984	Ivide Thudangunnu	Peter	
1984	Itha Innu Muthal	'Kailasam' Raju	
1984	Athirathram	Anthony	
1984	Ariyaatha Veethikal	Soman	
1984	Arante Mulla Kochu Mulla	Rajappan	
1984	Adiyozhukkukal	Jayarajan	
1985	Akalathe Ambili	Maniyan	
1985	Vannu Kandu Keezhadakki	Suresh	
1985	Angadikkappurathu	Vasu	
1985	Nokkethadhoorathu Kannum Nattu	Abdu	
1985	Jeevante Jeevan	Prakash	
1985	Boeing Boeing	Kuttappan	
1985	Aram + Aram = Kinnaram	Saravanan	
1985	Akkare Ninnoru Maran	Achuthan	
1985	Karimpinpoovinakkare	Raju	
1986	Dheem Tharikida Thom	Siva Subrahmaniam	
1986	Yuvajanotsavam	Bhagaval Das	
1986	Nimishangal	Joseph	
1986	Ithramathram	Rajeevan	
1986	T. P. Balagopalan M. A.	Narayankutty	
1986	Katturumbinum Kathu Kuthu	Babu	
1986	Ponnum Kudathinum Pottu	College student	
1986	Thalavattam	Joseph	
1986	Hello My Dear Wrong Number	Ramadasan	
1986	Poovinu Puthiya Poonthennal	Alex	
1986	Ayalvasi Oru Daridravasi	Vidyadharan	
1986	Mazha Peyyunnu Maddalam Kottunnu	Damu	
1987	Poovizhi Vasalile		Tamil film
1987	Ellavarkkum Nanmakal		
1987	Sarvakalashala	Chakkara	
1987	P.C. 369	Damodaran Pillai	
1987	January Oru Orma	Narayana Swamy	
1987	Ithrayum Kaalam	Unni Nampoothiri	
1988	Vellanakalude Nadu	Gopi	
1988	Mukunthetta Sumitra Vilikkunnu		
1988	Ayitham	Thankamani	
1988	Oru Muthassi Katha	Abdu	
1988	Chithram	Murugan	
1988	Aryan	Adv. Radhakrishnan	
1988	Kudumbapuranam	Murali	
1989	Mahayanam		
1989	Kireedam	Najeeb	
1989	Adhipan	Gopalakrishnan	
1989	Vandanam	Hariharan Iyer	
1989	Season	Kanthi	
1989	Nair Saab	Cadet Chandran Pillai	
1989	Naduvazhikal	Ravi	
1989	Nocturne Indien	Restaurant owner	

==== 1990s ====
Year	Title	Role	Notes
1990	Kadathanadan Ambadi	Kandasseri	
1990	Aye Auto	Thangu	
1990	Malayogom	Dr. Sudhakaran	
1990	Kouthuka Varthakal	Ramamoorthy	
1990	His Highness Abdullah	Raja Raja Varma	
1990	Pavam Pavam Rajakumaran	Gangadharan	
1990	Akkare Akkare Akkare	Gopi	
1990	No.20 Madras Mail	Hitchcock Kanjikuzhi	
1991	Ganamela	Kannan	
1991	Adhwaytham	Chithran Nampoothiri	
1991	Aakasha Kottayile Sultan	Murali	
1991	Anaswaram		
1992	Kizhakkan Pathrose	Mathai	
1992	Kudumbasametham	Sreedharan Kurup	
1992	Kallan Kappalil Thanne	Adv. Jose Kurien	
1992	Aham	Marfee Markose	
1992	Vasudha		
1992	Johnnie Walker	Professor	
1992	Neelakurukkan		
1992	Thalastaanam	Narendran Pillai	
1992	Ellarum Chollanu	Mani	
1992	Ayalathe Adheham	Achuthan Singh	
1993	Sthalathe Pradhana Payyans	Thankachan	
1993	Ekalavyan	Chandran Vallappuzha	
1993	Kudumbasneham		
1993	Chenkol	Najeeb	
1993	Butterflies	Krishnan Eradi	
1993	Paithrukam		
1993	Mafia		
1993	Devasuram	Bharathan	
1994	Ponthan Mada		
1994	Rudraksham	Appu	
1994	Kudumba Vishesham	Prasad M. Nair	
1994	Commissioner	Gopinathan	
1994	CID Unnikrishnan B.A., B.Ed.	Prem Shankar	
1994	Minnaram	'Mazhuvan' Manikantan / Lassar	
1994	Cabinet	Razzak	
1995	Simhavalan Menon	Patrick	
1995	Spadikam	Kunju Mohammad	
1995	Rajakeeyam	Pushpangathan	
1995	Agnidevan	Poojari Potti Kunju	
1995	Aadyathe Kanmani	Dineshan Unnithan	
1995	Oru Abhibhashakante Case Diary	Unni Thampuran	
1996	Sathyabhamakkoru Premalekhanam	Shambu	
1996	Mahathma	Attorney Koshy	
1996	Kala Pani	Nair	
1996	Aayiram Naavulla Ananthan	Madhavan	
1997	Sayaamees Irattakal		
1997	Asuravamsam	Inspector	
1997	Chandralekha		
1997	Oru Yathramozhi		
1997	Aaraam Thampuran	Soman Pillai	
1997	Kannur		
1997	Bharatheeyam		
1997	Ullasapoongattu	Kuriyachan	
1997	Lelam	Umman	
1997	Kottappurathe Koottukudumbam	Mahadevan	
1997	Janathipathyam	SI Abootty	
1998	Aaraam Jaalakam		
1998	Poothiruvathira Ravil		
1998	Thirakalkkappuram		
1998	Anuragakottaram	Private Detective Hentry	
1998	Harikrishnans	Kunjikuttan's Advocate	
1998	Kallu Kondoru Pennu	Mohanachandran	
1999	F. I. R.	CI Gurumoorthy	
1999	Kannezhuthi Pottum Thottu	Mulaku	
1999	Stalin Sivadas	Mayor Anto	
1999	Ustaad	Adv. Abraham	
1999	Pallavur Devanarayanan	Manavedathan Nampoothiri	
1999	The Godman	SI Karippetti Marthandan	

==== 2000s ====
Year	Title	Role	Notes
2000	Sahayathrikakku Snehapoorvam		
2000	Narasimham	CI Habeeb	
2000	Swayamvara Panthal	S.I Vijayan	
2000	Sathyameva Jayathe	SI George	
2000	Pilots	Venkidi	
2001	Sharja To Sharja	Sethu	
2001	Naranathu Thampuran	Mohandas	
2001	Raavanaprabhu		Cameo
2001	Suryachakram		
2001	Nariman	Moytheen	
2002	Thandavam	Pushpakumar	
2002	Chathurangam	Alex	
2003	Sahodaran Sahadevan	Balagopalan	
2003	Leader	Sadasivan	
2004	Njan Salperu Ramankutty	Sankaran	
2004	Kottaram Vaidyan	Thirumukham Pillai	
2004	Vamanapuram Bus Route	Rajappan	
2004	Kerala House Udan Vilpanakku	Pisharadi	
2004	Udayam		
2004	Mayilattam	Swaminathan	
2005	Chandrolsavam	C.I. Sugathan	
2005	Rajamanikyam	Adv. Shivadaas Menon	
2005	Anandabhadram	Police Constable	
2006	Prajapathi	Kumaran	
2006	The Don	Abdullah	
2006	Pothan Vava	Paulachan	
2007	Pranayakalam		
2007	Chotta Mumbai	Adv. Menon	
2007	Big B	Dr. Venu	
2007	Nasrani	Kunjachan	
2007	Akkare Ninnoru Sultan		
2007	Janmam		
2008	Pakal Nakshatrangal	Tharakan	
2008	One Way Ticket		
2008	Malabar Wedding	Unni	
2008	Sound of Boot	Antony	
2008	Annan Thampi	Appu's and Achu's uncle	
2008	Twenty:20	SI Gopi	
2008	Thalappavu	Shivan Pillai	
2009	Red Chillies	SI Palaniswamy	
2009	Perumaal		
2009	Evidam Swargamanu	Adv. Jayaraj	
2009	Shudharil Shudhan	Kanaran	
2009	Dr. Patient	Shankaran	
2009	Calendar	Fr. Thazhekkadan	
2009	Duplicate	Devan	
2009	Kerala Cafe		
2009	Gulumaal: The Escape	Rangaswami / Ahammedkutty	

==== 2010s ====
Year	Title	Role	Notes
2010	Kanmazha Peyyum Munpe		
2010	Plus Two	Avarachan	
2010	Happy Husbands	Pazhakutti Pavithran	
2010	Oru Naal Varum	Ramesh	
2010	Elsamma Enna Aankutty	S.I. Sunandappan	
2011	Kudumbasree Travels	Nettar	
2011	Ninnishtam Ennishtam 2		
2011	Oru Marubhoomikkadha	Jose	
2011	Rathinirvedam	Pattalam Maman	
2011	Innanu Aa Kalyanam	Kuttichan	
2011	Vellaripravinte Changathi	Preman	
2011	Kunjettan		
2011	Sevenes	Habeebullah	
2012	Thalsamayam Oru Penkutty	Ayyappan	
2012	Da Thadiya	John Prakash	
2012	Simhasanam		
2012	Diamond Necklace	V. K. Narayana Menon	
2012	Ustad Hotel	Chef Babu	
2012	Kunjaliyan	Vikrama Kurup	
2012	Cobra: Kottayam Brothers	Balan	
2013	Ardhanaari	Jameela	
2013	Black Butterfly	Mahadevan	
2013	Radio	Priya's father	
2013	Lokpal	Minister Anirudhan	
2013	Second Innings		
2013	Tourist Home	Sathyanathan	
2013	Idukki Gold	Madan	
2013	Namboothiri Yuvavu @ 43	Jayanthan Namboothiri	
2014	Samsaaram Aarogyathinu Haanikaram	Prabhakaran Thanchappuzha	
2014	My Dear Mummy		
2014	Thamarassery to Thailand		
2014	Bad Boys		
2014	Close Friends		
2014	Munnariyippu		
2014	Rosappookkaalam		
2014	Bangalore Days	Prakash	
2014	Tamaar Padaar		
2015	Thinkal Muthal Velli Vare	C. I. Dhanapalan	
2015	Premam	College Principal	
2015	Acha Dhin	SI Soman	
2015	Oru Second Class Yathra	ASI Johnson	
2015	Kanyaka Talkies	Sadanandan	
2015	Kukkiliyar	Raveendran	
2016	Paavada	Adv. Gunasekharan Nair	
2016	Ore Mukham	Older Ayyappadas	
2016	Anuraga Karikkin Vellam	Prakash Kopara	
2016	Karinkunnam 6's	Pillai	
2016	Kochavva Paulo Ayyappa Coelho	Himself	
2017	Sakhavu	Rajan	
2017	Comrade in America	Babychan	
2017	Pullikkaran Staraa	Murali Nambiar	
2017	Adam Joan	Andrews	
2017	Lavakusha		
2018	Shikkari Shambhu	Sahadevan	
2018	Mohanlal	Himself	
2018	Panchavarnathatha	Abraham	
2018	My Story	Vishwan	
2019	Pathinettam Padi	Sudheer Kumar	
2019	Finals	Sports Minister Siva Shankara Pillai	
2019	Ganagandharvan	Kuttan	
2019	Thelivu		

==== 2020s ====
Year	Title	Role	Notes
2022	Viddikalude Maash		
2022	Varayan	Isthaakki	
2023	Poovan		
2023	Maheshum Marutiyum	Padmanabhan 'Pappettan'	
2023	Enkilum Chandrike	Shambu	
2023	Corona Papers	Pillai	
2023	Neymar		
2024	Iyer In Arabia		
2024	Gu		
2024	Kudumbasthreeyum Kunjadum		
2024	Paalum Pazhavum	Tamarakshan	
2025	Thudarum	Kuttychan	
2025	Bha. Bha. Ba.	Ravindran Thillenkery	
2026	Prathichaya	Ramkrishnan	
2027	Harivarasanam †	TBA	

=== As producer ===
- Hello My Dear Wrong Number (1985)
- Vellanakalude Nadu (1988)
- Aye Auto (1990)
- Anaswaram (1991)
- Kannezhuthi Pottum Thottu (1999)
- Anandabhadram (2005)
- Chotta Mumbai (2007)
- Oru Naal Varum (2010)
- Black Butterfly (2013)
- Pavada (2016)
- Panchavarnathatha (2018)
- Finals (2019)
- Maheshum Marutiyum (2023)
- Gu (2024)

=== Web series ===
Year	Title	Role	Notes
2024	Jai Mahendran	Koshy Thomas Revenue Minister	

== Television ==
=== As judge ===
- Comedy Super Show (Flowers Tv)
- Comedy Stars Plus (Asianet Plus)
- Comedy Stars Season 2 (Asianet)
- Comedy Stars (Asianet)

=== As host ===
- Beautiful minds (YouTube)
- Laughing Villa (Surya TV)
- Malayali Durbar (Amrita TV)
- Jambanum Thumbanum (Asianet Plus)

=== As actor ===
- Ettu Sundarikalum Njanum (Surya TV) 2004-2005
- Mahatma Gandhi Colony (Surya TV) 2007-2008
- Kadamattathu Kathanar (Asianet)- 2004-2005
- Sthree (Asianet) 1998-2000
- Laksharchana (Doordarshan) 1995-1996
- Aarohanam (Kairali TV) 2013-2014
- Akshayapatram (Asianet)- 2001-2002

== Controversy ==
Actress Minu Muneer accused Maniyanpilla Raju of harassment. He later denied it and said he would be fine with the investigations if true.
