= Balachandra Menon =

Indian actor

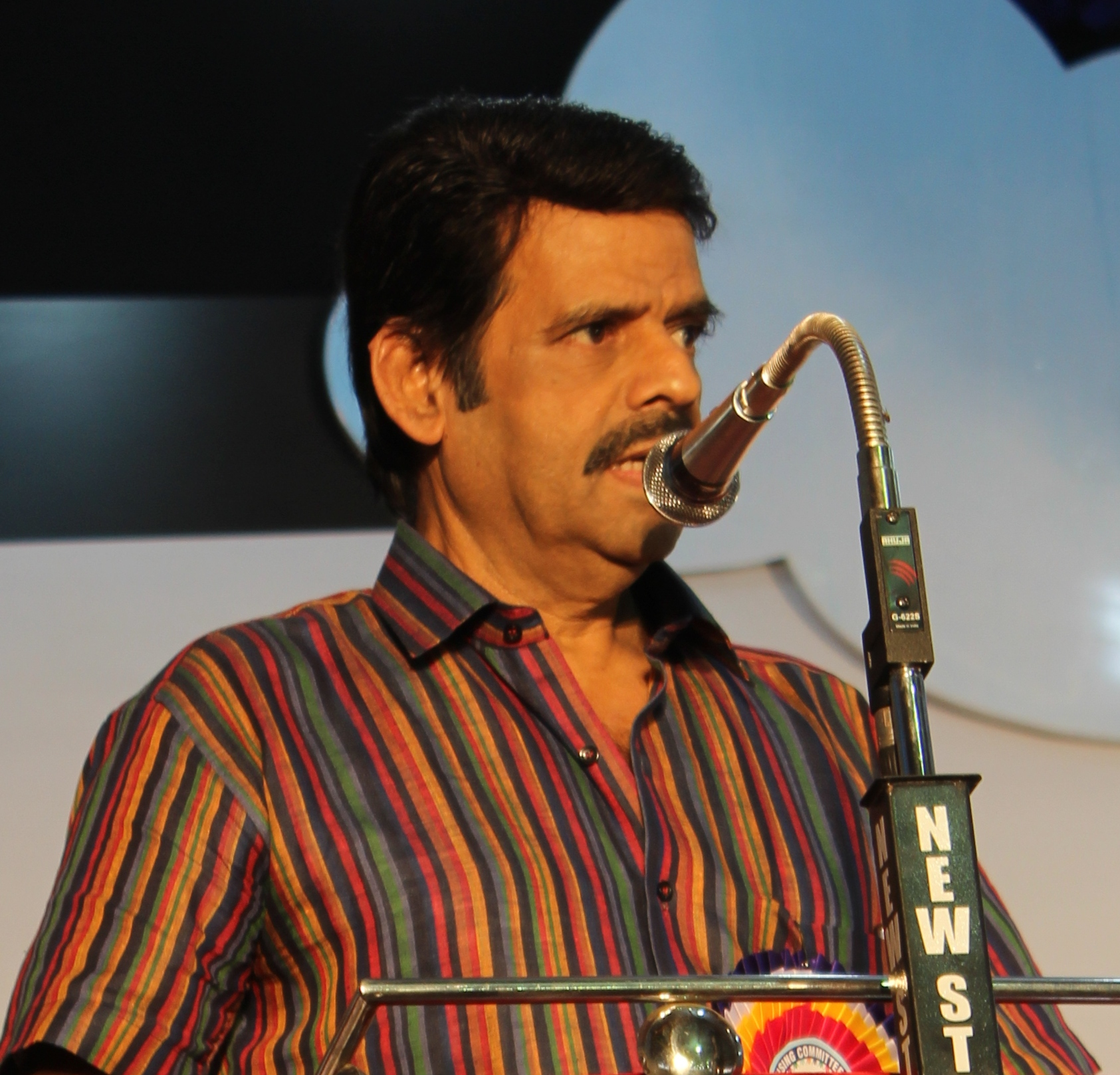
- Menon in 2014
- Born: 11 January 1954 (age 72); Kollam, Kerala, India
- Occupations: Director; actor; screenwriter; author; journalist; lawyer; producer; distributor; editor; singer; composer
- Years active: 1978 – present
- Height: 1.73 m (5 ft 8 in)
- Spouse: Varada (m. 1982)
- Children: 2
- Parent(s): Sivasankara Pillai; Lalitha Devi
- Website: balachandramenon.com

Balachandra Menon (born 11 January 1954) is an Indian actor, director and script writer. He made a number of films in the 1980s and 1990s. He has directed 40 films and has acted in over 100.

He won two National Film Awards including the National Film Award for Best Actor for his performance as station master Ismail the 1998 film Samaantharangal, which was also directed by him. He has also worked as a distributor, editor, composer, singer and producer in the Malayalam film industry. He has found space in the Limca Book of Records for the maximum number of films directed, scripted and acted in. Menon has introduced many actors into the Malayalam Cinema Industry. Actors who made their debut in his films include Shobana in April 18, Parvathy in Vivahithare Ithile, Maniyanpilla Raju in Maniyan Pilla Adhava Maniyan Pilla, Karthika in Manicheppu Thurannappol, Annie in Ammayane Sathyam, and Nandini in April 19.

== Personal life ==
Balachandra Menon was born in Kollam in 1954 to Shivashankara Pillai and Lalitha Devi. By virtue of his father being a railway station master, he served at Edava railway station and Menon had his formative years of childhood and adolescence life in this village. He studied at Edava Muslim High School, and has narrated nostalgically about his fond memories of his life in Edava in his autobiography Ammayaane Sathyam. He is an alumnus of University College Trivandrum, Fatima Mata National College, Kollam and Kerala Law Academy Law College, Thiruvananthapuram. Sisters: Sushma and Prema. Wife: Varada B. Menon. Children: Akhil Vinayak Menon, Bhavana B. Menon. Menon enrolled as a lawyer on 29 July 2012, 22 years after completing his degree. In 1997, he won the Karshakashree Award for farming from the Government of Kerala.

During his early days in Madras, he worked for the film weekly Nana as a correspondent. His column in Nana, 'Nanaji's Cinema Varaphalam' (Nanaji's Cinema Weekly), was very popular at the time. He has completed a diploma in journalism from Press Club, Trivandrum.

== Literary works ==
- Achuvettante Veedu
- Mugam Abhimugam
- Samaantharangal
- 18 April 19 April
- Ninnay Enthinu Kollaam ?
- Kaanatha Sulthanu Snehapoorvam
- Ammayanay Sathyam
- Ariyathathu, Ariyendathu
- Balachandramenonte 12 cherukathakal
- His book Ithirineram Othirikaryam recently released by veteran actor Madhu by handing over a copy to lyricist Sreekumaran Thampi.

== Awards ==
Civilian Awards:

- 2007 – Padma Shri

National Film Awards:

- 1997 – Best Actor – Samaantharangal
- 1997 – Best Film on Family Welfare – Samaantharangal

Kerala State Film Awards:

- 1979 – Best Screen Play – Uthrada Rathri
- 1997 – Special Jury Award – Samaantharangal

Filmfare Awards South:

- 1983 – Best Director – Karyam Nissaram
- 1998 – Best Actor – Samaantharangal

Others:

- 2018 - Limca Book of Records - Filmmaker who is credited as actor, director and writer in the most number of feature films

== Filmography ==
=== As a director, writer, and producer ===
Year	Film	Credited as				Notes
Year	Film	Director	Writer	Producer	Editor	Notes
1978	Uthrada Rathri	✓	✓			
1979	Radha Enna Pennkutti	✓	✓			
1980	Aniyatha Valakal	✓	✓			
1980	Ishtamanu Pakshe	✓	✓			
1980	Kalika	✓				
1980	Vaiki Vanna Vasantham	✓	✓			
1981	Maniyan Pilla Adhava Maniyan Pilla	✓	✓			
1981	Prema Geethangal	✓	✓			
1981	Tharattu	✓	✓			
1982	Chiriyo Chiri	✓	✓			
1982	Ithiri Neram Othiri Karyam	✓	✓			
1982	Kelkatha Shabdam	✓	✓			
1982	Kilukilukkam	✓	✓			
1983	Karyam Nissaram	✓	✓			
1983	Prashnam Gurutharam	✓	✓			
1983	Sesham Kazhchayil	✓	✓			
1984	Inakkilly					
1984	April 18	✓	✓			
1984	Arante Mulla Kochu Mulla	✓	✓			
1984	Oru Painkilikatha	✓	✓			
1985	Ente Ammu Ninte Thulasi Avarude Chakki	✓	✓	✓		
1985	Manicheppu Thurannappol	✓	✓			
1986	Thaiku Oru Thalattu	✓	✓ Story			Tamil film
1986	Vivahitare Itihile	✓	✓	✓		
1986	Rithubhedam					
1987	Achuvettante Veedu	✓	✓		✓	
1987	Vilambaram	✓	✓			
1989	Kandathum Kettathum	✓	✓			
1989	Najangalude Kochu Doctor	✓	✓		✓	
1990	Kuruppinte Kanakku Pustakom	✓	✓		✓	
1991	Nayam Vyakthamakkunnu	✓	✓			
1993	Ammayane Sathyam	✓	✓			
1994	Santhana Gopalam					
1994	Sukham Sukhakaram	✓	✓			
1996	Kanden Seethaiyai	✓	✓			Unreleased film
1996	April 19	✓	✓			
1998	Samaantharangal	✓	✓	✓	✓	
2002	Krishna Gopalakrishna	✓	✓		✓	
2003	Varum Varunnu Vannu		✓			
2008	De Ingottu Nokkiye	✓	✓			
2015	Njan Samvidhanam Cheyyum	✓	✓	✓		
2018	Ennaalum Sarath..?	✓	✓			

=== As an actor ===
Year	Film	Role	Notes			
Year	Film	Role	Notes	1978	Uthrada Rathri	Dinesh
1981	Maniyan Pilla Adhava Maniyan Pilla	Gopinathan				
1981	Prema Geethangal	Doctor				
1981	Tharattu	Dileep				
1981	Thenum Vayambum	Babu Mathew				
1982	Chiriyo Chiri	Unni				
1982	Ithiri Neram Othiri Karyam	Geejo				
1982	Kelkatha Shabdam	Lambodharan Nair				
1982	Kilukilukkam	Mahendran				
1983	Karyam Nissaram	Shekhar				
1983	Prashnam Gurutharam	Balu				
1983	Sesham Kazhchayil	G K Raja				
1984	Inakkilly	Johnay				
1984	April 18	Ravikumar				
1984	Arante Mulla Kochu Mulla	Prabhakaran				
1984	Oru Painkilikatha	Kannan				
1985	Ente Ammu Ninte Thulasi Avarude Chakki	S. Nandakumar				
1985	Daivatheyorthu	Achuthankutty				
1985	Manicheppu Thurannappol					
1986	Vivahitare Itihile	Appu				
1986	Rithubhedam	Rajan				
1987	Achuvettante Veedu	Vipin				
1987	Vilambaram	P. K. Nampoothiri				
1987	Oru Maymasappularayil					
1988	Kudumbapuranam	Krishnanunni				
1988	Janmandharam	Police Officer				
1988	Isabella	Unnikrishna Menon				
1988	David David Mr. David	David				
1988	Oohakachavadam	Charlie				
1989	Kandathum Kettathum	P K Krishnankutty				
1989	Najangalude Kochu Doctor	James Varghese				
1990	Varthamana Kalam	Jameskutty				
1990	Noottonnu Raavukal	Vishnu				
1990	Sasneham	Thomas Kurien				
1990	Kuruppinte Kanakku Pustakom	Vinayachandra Kurup				
1993	Ammayane Sathyam	S. Narayanan				
1994	Santhana Gopalam	Sudhakaran				
1994	Sukham Sukhakaram					
1995	Avittam Thirunaal Aarogya Sriman	Prabhakaran				
1996	Kanden Seethaiyai		Unreleased film			
1996	April 19	Jayapraksh				
1997	Krishnagudiyil Oru Pranayakalathu	Pavi				
1997	Janathipathyam	Krishnamoorthy IPS				
1998	The Truth	Chief Minister Madhavan				
1998	Samaantharangal	Ismail				
2000	Sathyameva Jayathe	Ahammed Basheer				
2000	Sathyam Sivam Sundaram	K.S.K Nambiar				
2001	Ishtam	Anjana's Father				
2002	Krishna Gopalakrishna	Gopalakrishnan				
2002	Album	Ranganathan	Tamil film			
2002	Nammal	Sathyanadhan				
2003	Saphalam	Barrister Nambiar				
2003	Varum Varunnu Vannu	Johny				
2005	Rappakal	Deva Narayanan				
2005	December	Dr Keshava Patteri				
2006	Classmates	Prof. Iyer				
2007	Pranayakalam	Balagopal				
2008	De Ingottu Nokkiye	Joji				
2008	College Kumaran	Narayanan				
2009	Utharaswayamvaram	Sreedhara 'Yamandan' Kurup				
2009	Nammal Thammil	Ramachandran Nair				
2013	Buddy	Shankaran Namboothiri/Shanku Bhai				
2013	Kunjananthante Kada	Adv. Moidu				
2013	Kadal Kadannu Oru Maathukutty	Father Vattathara				
2015	Njan Samvidhanam Cheyyum	Krishna Das				
2016	Oozham	Krishnamoorthy				
2018	Ennaalum Sarath..?	Dr. Sam				
2021	One	Dr. Sreekar Varma				
2023	Pulimada	Dr. Joshi Kuriyan				
2023	A Ranjith Cinema	Chandraprakash				
2026	Prathichaya	KN Varghese				

== Television ==
- Suryodayam (Doordarshan, Direction)
- Vilakku Vekkum Neram (Doordarshan)
- Megham (Asianet)
- Malayogam (Asianet)
- Nizhalukal (Asianet)
- Shamanathalam

== Discography ==
As composer

- Kuruppinte Kanakku Pustakom (1990)
- Samaantharangal (1998)
- Krishna Gopalakrishna (2002)

As playback singer

- Oru Painkilikatha (1984) - "Aanakoduthaalum"
- Ente Ammu Ninte Thulasi Avarude Chakki (1985) "Kochu Chakkarachi Pettu"
- Najangalude Kochu Doctor (1989) - "Kaattinum Thaalam"
- Krishna Gopalakrishna (2002) - "Choodulla Kaattil"
