= Najangalude Kochu Doctor =

- Directed by: Balachandra Menon
- Written by: Balachandra Menon
- Screenplay by: Balachandra Menon
- Starring: Srividya; Thilakan; Balachandra Menon; Revathy; Nedumudi Venu; Sukumaran; M. G. Soman
- Cinematography: Saroj Padi
- Edited by: Balachandra Menon
- Music by: Darsan Raman
- Production company: Ajitha Sini Arts
- Distributed by: Ajitha Sini Arts
- Release date: 1989
- Country: India
- Language: Malayalam

Najangalude Kochu Doctor is a 1989 Indian Malayalam film, directed by Balachandra Menon. The film stars Srividya, Thilakan, Balachandra Menon and Revathy in the lead roles. The film has musical score by Darsan Raman.

== Plot ==
The movie opens with Revathi coming with his son to visit Balachandra Menon's house where only his grandmother Sukumari lives now. Menon's son, during the stay at his house, asks Sukumari who is his father and the movie cuts to the flashback. Menon plays the young grandson of Sukumari who was returned from UK after completing his postgraduate medical degree. He is an easygoing and lazy person who does not like to work in their family hospital and instead hangs out at his friend Nedumudi Venu's house which Sukumari doesn't approve since he is a working-class person who fishes for a living. Menon helps arranging ornaments for Venu's sister Parvathi's marriage while one day she faints at her house and is diagnosed of advanced lung cancer. She eventually succumbs to death at Menon's hospital which drives Venu into depression, and he leaves the place. Menon is also depressed at the turn of events and wishes to leave the place briefly to practice at any far-off village. He takes charge at the hospital of Thilakan, a cunning businessman who does not care about the people's wellbeing. His hospital is run by his son Sukumaran who unnecessary subjects the patients to tests and medicines to provide more business to the medical shop and laboratories run by his relatives Sunny, Santosh, and Sivaji. Menon stars gaining the trust of the villagers by treating them properly. He also gets romantically involved with his neighbor and social worker Revathi.

At the hospital, one elderly woman dies due to the negligence and improper treatment of Sukumaran and her son Baiju who is an epileptic young man faints at the hospital. Menon beats up Sukumaran and quits the hospital. The villagers come together and request Menon to stay at the village to treat the locals. They come together and build a clinic for him where he starts practicing. Thilakan gets a stroke and becomes bedridden after an income tax raid at their house. Sukumaran misguides Baiju by convincing him that his mother died to the mistreatment of Menon only and that is why he took Baiju under his wings and gave him a job at his clinic itself out of his guilty. Sunny, Shivaji, and Santosh hatch a plan to kill Menon by inviting him for dinner as a truce party at a guest house and then rigging the wash basin tap with electricity, thus planning to electrocute Menon to death. However, Menon realizes the plan, fights, and subdues the 3 of them. Menon gets physically close to Revathi in between, resulting in her becoming pregnant. He marries her unofficially and decides to go and meet Sukumari to get married properly. Just before leaving, some villagers come to Menon asking for help since Baiju is having another fits attack. While Menon tries to attend him, Baiju who has misunderstood Menon to be responsible for his mother's death, stabs him from behind on gaining consciousness, injuring him critically. The whole village assembles at the hospital to see Menon survive, but he succumbs to his injuries. The movie returns to the present, where Sukumari declares she wants to see her great-grandson also grow to be a doctor like her grandson.

== Cast ==
- Balachandra Menon as Dr. James Varghese Kalapurackal aka Jomon
- Revathy as Mini, Jomon's love interest
- Sukumari as Thressiakutty Kalapurackal aka Ammamma
- Nedumudi Venu as Hameed, Jomon's Childhood Friend
- Parvathy Jayaram as Ayisha, Hameed's Sister
- Lissy as Alice, Nurse in Kalapurackal Hospital
- M. G. Soman as Church Vikar
- Sukumaran as Dr. Devan
- Srividya as Devan's Wife
- Thilakan as Devan's Father
- K. P. A. C. Sunny as Devan's Uncle
- Santhosh as Rajeevan, Devan's Cousin
- Shivaji as Jagannadhan, Devan's Uncle
- Baiju as Gopi
- Oduvil Unnikrishnan as Pattalam, Mini's Father
- Mamukkoya as Basheer, Attender in Kalapurackal Hospital
- Adoor Pankajam as Nurse in Devan's Hospital
- Poojappura Ravi as Kuruppu, Ammamma's Servant
- Master Arfan Ayub as Appu (Jomon-Mini's Son)
- Jagathy N. K. Achary

== Soundtrack ==
The music was composed by Darsan Raman and the lyrics were by S Ramesan Nair

No.	Song	Singers	Length (m:ss)
1	"Kaattinum Thaalam"	Srividya, Balachandra Menon	
2	"Meghangal Thenkudangal"	K. J. Yesudas, Alice	
3	"Mekhangal"	S. Janaki, Alice	
4	"Uthradakkattinte"	M. G. Radhakrishnan, Alice	
5	"Vaarthinkal Paalkkudamenthum"	K. S. Chithra	
