= April 18 (film) =

- Directed by: Balachandra Menon
- Written by: Balachandra Menon
- Produced by: Augustine Prakash
- Starring: Balachandra Menon; Shobana; Adoor Bhasi; Bharat Gopy
- Cinematography: Vipin Mohan
- Edited by: K. P. Hariharaputhran
- Music by: A. T. Ummer
- Production company: Santhosh Films
- Distributed by: Santhosh Films
- Release date: 12 April 1984
- Country: India
- Language: Malayalam

April 18 is a 1984 Malayalam-language film written and directed by Balachandra Menon, who also features in the lead role. It stars Shobana, Adoor Bhasi, and Bharat Gopy in other pivotal roles. It was the debut Malayalam movie of Shobana as lead actress. The musical score was composed by A. T. Ummer.. The movie was a blockbuster .

== Plot ==
Inspector Ravi marries Sobhana after a love affair and they lead a very happy married life. He is also a very strict police officer. Ravi purchases a saree on behalf of his friend who is in jail and hides this from Sobhana on the advice of Gopi Pillai. This leads to suspicion and Sobhana leaves for her home, expecting Ravi to take her back. However, things take a turn when Ravi arrests Jimmy, son of Marcose, against his father-in-law's (Narayana Pillai) wishes. An aggrieved Narayana Pillai files a divorce suit despite objections from Sobhana and appoints Thomachan as his legal counsel. The irony is that Thomachan is a close friend of Ravi, and they live in the same apartment. As Thomachan's arguments hurt Sobhana, Ravi agrees to separation to save a pregnant Sobhana from further humiliation. The court adjourns for decree on April 18, and outside the court, things take a complete turnaround.

== Cast ==
- Balachandra Menon as Sub Inspector Ravikumar
- Shobana (credited as Meera) as Sobhana
- Adoor Bhasi as Narayana Pillai, Sobhana's father
- Bharat Gopy as Gopi Pillai Head Constable.
- Unni Mary as wife of Thomachan
- Venu Nagavalli as adv George Thomas alias Thomachan
- Roshni as Thomachan's Daughter
- Jose Prakash as Marcose
- Sukumari as Judge
- Adoor Bhavani as Naniyamma
- Santhosh as Jacob
- KPAC Sunny as DIG Santhosh Varma
- Baiju as Boy in Police Station

== Soundtrack ==
All songs were composed by A. T. Ummer, and the lyrics were written by Bichu Thirumala.

| Track No. | Song | Singer |
|---|---|---|
| 01 | Aadivaroo Azhake | K. J. Yesudas, S. Janaki |
| 02 | Azhimathi Naaraapilla | K. J. Yesudas |
| 03 | Kaalindee Theeram Thannil | K. J. Yesudas, S. Janaki |

== Legacy ==
In 2007, the screenplays of Balachandra Menon's films April 18 and April 19 were published together in a book titled Randu Thirakkathakal, released by Malayalam poet and lyricist Sreekumaran Thampi. The publication is listed among Menon's literary works in a feature on Malayala Manorama.

Menon has described the two films as thematically contrasting works, with April 18 focusing on youthful aspirations and forward-looking expectations, and April 19 presenting a more reflective narrative centred on the consequences of life choices.
