= List of Malayalam films of 1988 =

The following is a list of Malayalam films released in the year 1988.

Opening		Film	Cast	Director	Music director	Notes
J A N	8	Kakkothikkavile Appooppan Thaadikal	Revathi, Kiran Vergis	Kamal	Ouseppachan	
J A N	15	Vicharana	Mammootty, Sobhana	Sibi Malayil	Ouseppachan	
J A N	15	Kandathum Kettathum	Thilakan, Balachandra Menon	Balachandra Menon		
J A N	21	Dhinarathrangal	Mammootty, Sumalatha	Joshi	Shyam	
J A N	25	Oozham	Madhu, Sukumari	Harikumar	M. K. Arjunan	
J A N	29	Adholokam	Jagathy Sreekumar, Nedumudi Venu	Thevalakkara Chellappan	Raveendran	
J A N	29	Mukunthetta Sumitra Vilikkunnu	Mohanlal, Sreenivasan	Priyadarshan	Ouseppachan	
F E B	11	Puravrutham	Revathy, Om Puri	Lenin Rajendran	Kavalam Narayana Panicker	
F E B	18	Oru CBI Diary Kurippu	Mammootty, Suresh Gopi	K. Madhu	Shyam	
F E B	19	Bheekaran	Rajkumar, Bheeman Raghu	Prem	G. Devarajan	
F E B	19	Daisy	Harish Kumar, Sonia	Prathap K. Pothan	Shyam	
F E B	19	Agnichirakulla Thumbi	Sathaar, Anuradha	P. K. Krishnan	Shyam	
F E B	19	Poonnanujathi		R. Krishnamoorthy		
F E B	19	Karate Girls	Anuradha, Bheeman Raghu	Gokul	Shankar–Ganesh	
F E B	20	Witness	Jayaram, Jagathy Sreekumar	Viji Thampi	Ouseppachan	
M A R	5	Unnikrishnante Adyathe Christmas	Jayaram, Sumalatha	Kamal	Johnson	
M A R	13	Marikkunnilla Njan	Kaviyoor Ponnamma, Nedumudi Venu	P. K. Radhakrishnan	Raveendran	
M A R	14	Mrithunjayam	Devan, Parvathy	Paul Babu	Ouseppachan	
M A R	18	Vida Parayaanmathram	Devan, Sandhya	P. K. Joseph	M. K. Arjunan	
M A R	20	Sanghunadam	Mammootty, Suresh Gopi	T. S. Suresh Babu	Jerry Amaldev	
M A R	25	Uyaran Orumikkan		Vayanar Vallabhan	Aravindan Thevara	
M A R	25	Theruvu Narthaki	Balan K. Nair, Bheeman Raghu	N. Sankaran Nair	Vijayabhaskar	
M A R	25	Onninu Purake Mattonnu	Thilakan, Nedumudi Venu	Thulasidas	Kannur Rajan	
M A R	26	Itha Oru Penkutty	Babitha, Rajesh	Jayadevan	A. T. Ummer	
A P R	1	Thaala	Ashokan, Shari	Babu Radhakrishnan	Vaippin Surendran	
A P R	3	Oru Muthassi Katha	Vineeth, Nirosha	Priyadarshan	Ouseppachan	
A P R	5	Charavalayam	Innocent, Hari	K. S. Gopalakrishnan	S. P. Venkatesh	
A P R	7	Manu Uncle	Mammootty, Master Sreenivasan G.	Dennis Joseph	Shyam	
A P R	7	Ayitham	Mohanlal, Ambika	Venu Nagavally	M. G. Radhakrishnan	
A P R	13	Ambalakkara Panchaayath	Jayabharathi, Unnimary	Kabeer Rawuthar	Jerry Amaldev	
A P R	13	Orkkappurathu	Mohanlal, Nedumudi Venu	Kamal	Ouseppachan	
A P R	14	Abkari	Mammootty, Ratheesh	I. V. Sasi		
A P R	14	Ormayilennum	Sukumari, Ratheesh	T. V. Mohan	Jerry Amaldev	
A P R	14	Kudumbapuranam	Thilakan, Balachandra Menon	Sathyan Anthikad	Johnson	
A P R	29	Janmashathru	Anuradha, Balan K. Nair	K. S. Gopalakrishnan	Cochin Alex	
M A Y	6	Janmandharam	Balachandramenon, Shobhana	Thampi Kannanthanam	S. P. Venkatesh	
M A Y	12	Aparan	Jayaram, Shobana	P. Padmarajan	Johnson	
M A Y	13	Innaleyude Baakki	Captain Raju, Devan	P. A. Bakker	G. Devarajan	
M A Y	18	Simon Peter Ninakku Vendi	Madhu, Urvashi	P. G. Vishwambharan	A. T. Ummer	
M A Y	18	Sangham	Mammootty, Thilakan	Joshiy	Shyam	
M A Y	25	Venal Vasathi		A. T. Joy		
J U N	6	Rahasyam Parama Rahasyam	Ratheesh, Balan K. Nair	P. K. Joseph	S. P. Venkatesh	
J U N	8	Kanakambarangal	Thilakan, Murali	N. Sankaran Nair	K. Raghavan	
J U N	16	Pattanapravesham	Mohanlal, Sreenivasan	Sathyan Anthikkad	Shyam	
J U N	17	Loose Loose Arappiri Loose	Jagathy Sreekumar, Kuthiravattam Pappu	Prassi Malloor	Darsan Raman	
J U N	24	Paadha Mudra	Mohanlal, Seema	R. Sukumaran	Vidhyadharan	
J U N	24	David David Mr. David	Ashokan, Balachandra Menon	Viji Thampi	Raveendran	
J U L	1	Isabella	Sumalatha, Balachandra Menon	Mohan	Johnson	
J U L	9	Mamalakalkkappurathu	Manoj K. Jayan, Anil	Ali Akbar	Mohan Sithara	
J U L	21	August 1	Mammootty, Sukumaran	Sibi Malayil	Shyam	
J U L	29	Mattoral	Mammootty, Karamana Janardanan Nair	K. G. George	M. B. Sreenivasan	
A U G	6	Inquilabinte Puthri	Jose, KPAC Sunny	Jayadevan	A. T. Ummer	
A U G	13	Athirthikal	Madhu, Srividya	J. D. Thottan	G. Devarajan	
A U G	19	1921	Mammootty, Suresh Gopi	I. V. Sasi	Shyam	
A U G	24	Arjun Dennis	Ashokan, Nirosha	Thevalakkara Chellappan	S. P. Venkatesh	
A U G	25	Thanthram	Mammootty, Urvashi	Joshiy	Shyam	
A U G	25	Vaisali	Sanjay Mitra, Suparna Anand	Bharathan	Ravi	
A U G	25	Oru Vivaada Vishayam	Lissy, Devan	P. G. Vishwambharan		
A U G	28	Moonnam Pakkam	Thilakan, Jayaram	Padmarajan	Ilaiyaraaja	
S E P	9	Oohakachavadam	Adoor Bhasi, Balachandra Menon	K. Madhu	M. G. Radhakrishnan	
S E P	10	Adipapam	Vimal Raja, Abhilasha	P. Chandrakumar	Jerry Amaldev	
O C T	5	Onnum Onnum Pathinonnu	Ratheesh, Disco Shanti	Ravi Gupthan	Raveendran	
O C T	8	Alila Kuruvikal	Shobana, Madhu	S. L. Puram Anand	Mohan Sithara	
O C T	24	Aaryan	Mohanlal, Ramya Krishnan	Priyadarshan	Reghu Kumar	
N O V	4	Mukthi	Mammootty, Shobhana	I. V. Sasi		
N O V	10	Moonnam Mura	Mohanlal, Lalu Alex	K. Madhu	Shyam	
N O V	12	Anuragi	Mohanlal, Urvashi	I. V. Sasi	Gangai Amaran	
N O V	19	Parisile Ardharaathrikal		K. S. Rajan		
D E C	8	Aranyakam	Saleema, Devan	Hariharan	Raghunath Seth	
D E C	9	Vellanakalude Nadu	Mohanlal, Shobana	Priyadarshan	M. G. Radhakrishnan	
D E C	23	Ulsavapittennu	Mohanlal, Parvathy Jayaram	Bharath Gopi	G. Devarajan	
D E C	23	Chithram	Mohanlal, Ranjini	Priyadarshan	Kannur Rajan	
D E C	25	Dhwani	Prem Nazir, Jayaram	A. T. Abu	Naushad	
D E C	28	Ponmuttayidunna Tharavu	Sreenivasan, Jayaram	Sathyan Anthikkad	Johnson	
		Marattam				
		Ee Kadha Ente Kadha				
		Kanana Sundari				
		December				
		Aamukham				
		Ore Thooval Pakshikal				
		Evidence				

== Dubbed films ==
film	Direction	Story	Screenplay	Main actors
Asura Samhaaram	Rajan–Nagendra			
Nara Nayattu	Krishna Chandran			
Rekthaksharangal	Sathyan			
Kamandalu	Vijayakrishnan			
Sangeetha Sangamam	K. Viswanath			
Prathikaraam	K. S. R. Das			
Dheera Prathijna	Karatte Girls	Vijay		
