= Lalithasree =

Indian actress

- Born: Subhadra; Kottayam, Kerala, India
- Occupation: Actress
- Years active: 1976–present
- Spouse: Vijayasaradhi (divorced)
- Children: 1

Lalithasree is an Indian actress best known for her work in Malayalam cinema. She has acted in more than 450 films. She acts mainly in supporting roles. She is known for her comedy roles with Jagathy Sreekumar.

== Personal life ==
Lalithasree was born as Subhadra to Chandrasekharan Nair and Lakshmikuttiamma at vijayawada, Andrapradesh. She has an elder sister, Mallika and a younger brother, Vidyasagar. Her father was from Kottayam and her mother was from Palakkad. Her father, who was a doctor, shifted to Vijayawada and the family settled there. She was studying at the seventh grade when her father died. They migrated to Madras after her father's death. She made her debut at the age of 15 in the Tamil movie Unarchigal. She discontinued her studies and since became busy with movies

== Filmography ==
=== Malayalam ===
Year	Title	Role	Notes
1974	Devi Karumariyammanri		
1974	Sapthaswaragal		
1976	Madhuram Thirumadhuram	Nani	
1977	Vidarunna Mottukal	Kamakshi	
1977	Pallavi		
1977	Neethipeedam		
1977	Aparadhi		
1977	Aparaajitha		
1978	Seemanthini		
1978	Aalmaaraattam		
1978	Pokkattadikkaari		
1978	Kadathanaattu Maakkam		
1979	Allauddinum Albhutha Vilakkum	Sainaba	
1979	Anyarude Bhoomi		
1979	Kochu Thampuratti		
1979	Lillipookkal		
1979	Nithyavasantham		
1979	Ottapettavar		
1980	Ishtamanu Pakshe		
1981	Vida Parayum Munpe	Sudha's friend	
1981	Swarangal Swapnangal	Kalyani	
1981	Cancerum Laingika Rogangalum		
1981	Parankimala	Naniyamma	
1982	Football	Professor	
1982	Mazhu		
1982	Komaram		
1982	Vidhichathum Kothichathum		
1982	Anuraagakkodathi		
1982	Marmaram	Mrs. Sheshadri	
1983	Swapname Ninakku Nandi	Kaduthi Ponnamma	
1983	Mansoru Maha Samudram	Meenakshi	
1983	Asuran		
1983	Ee Yugam	Ammu	
1983	Varanmaare Aavashyamundu	Houseowner	
1983	Adaminte Vaariyellu	Ponnamma	
1983	Vellimohangal		
1984	Vikatakavi	Lalitha	
1984	Kudumbam Enna Swargam Bhaarya Oru Devatha		
1984	Ithiri Poove Chuvannapoove	Ammukutty	
1984	Koottinilamkili	Parvathyammal	
1984	Thathamme Poocha Poocha		
1984	Kadamattathachan	Aleyamma	
1984	Oru Kochu Swapnam	Sreedevi	
1984	Idavelakku Sesham	Hostel warden	
1984	Aashamsakalode		
1984	Aattuvanchi Ulanjappol		
1985	Akkare Ninnoru Maran	Pavithran's mother	
1985	Kiratham	Mariya	
1985	Nerariyum Nerathu	Vimala Menon	
1985	Anubandham		
1985	Chorakku Chora	Thankamma	
1985	Vellarikka Pattanam	Mariyamma	
1985	Muhurtham Pathnonnu Muppathinu	Sofia	
1985	Vasantha Sena	Victoria	
1985	Onningu Vannengil	Hostel warden Dakshayini	
1985	Guerrilla		
1985	Jeevante Jeevan	Mummy	
1985	Aarodum Parayaruthu		
1985	Kayyum Thalayum Purathidaruthu		
1986	Aayiram Kannukal	Devayani	
1986	Pidikittapulli		
1986	Aalorungi Arangorungi	Soshamma Cherian	
1986	Annoru Ravil		
1986	Ente Entethu Mathram	Rudrani	
1986	Nimishangal	Doctor Shekhar's wife	
1986	Niramulla Ravulkal	Meeramma	
1986	Panchagni	Convict at jail	
1986	Mazha Peyyunnu Maddalam Kottunnu	Thankam	
1986	Sakhavu		
1986	Snehamulla Simham		Cameo
1986	Veendum	Club lady	
1986	Ponnum Kudathinum Pottu	Janu	
1986	Ninnistham Ennishtam		
1986	Yuvajanotsavam		
1986	Love Story	Typing tutor	
1986	Katturumbinum Kathu Kuthu		
1986	Cabaret Dancer		
1986	Naale Njangalude Vivaham	Superintendent Devayani	
1986	Vivahithare Ithile	Achayan love interest	
1986	Shyama	Sister	
1987	Amme Bhagavathi	Alamelu	
1987	Naalkavala	Madhavi	
1987	Naradhan Keralathil	Pattalam Janaki	
1987	Mangalya Charthu	Sumathi	
1987	Ponnu		
1987	Dheeran		
1987	Ajantha		
1988	Moonnam Mura	Panicker's wife	
1988	Karate Girls		
1988	1921		
1988	Inquilabinte Puthri	HC Ammaluvamma	
1988	Thaala	Madhavi	
1988	Unnikrishnante Adyathe Christmas	Subhadra	
1988	Theruvu Narthaki		
1988	Janmashathru		
1989	Aval Oru Sindhu		
1989	Maharajavu		
1989	Rathibhavam		
1989	My Dear Rosi		
1989	Prabhaatham Chuvanna Theruvil		
1989	Antharjanam	Gayathri	
1989	Chakkikotha Chankaran		
1990	Crime Branch	Mathilakam Kamalamma	
1990	Minda Poochakku Kalyanam	Parukutty Amma	
1990	Anantha Vruthantham	Police officer	
1990	Judgement		
1990	Vasavadatta	Lalitha	
1990	Superstar	Chinnamma	
1990	Niyamam Enthucheyyum		
1991	Nayam Vyakthamakkunnu		
1991	Orutharam Randutharam Moonnutharam	Ammukutty	
1991	Aswathy	Doctor	
1991	Raid		
1991	Swargathilekkoru Kurukkuvazhi		Short film
1991	Apsarass		
1991	Koumara Swapnangal		
1991	Miss Stella		
1991	Aadhyamayi		
1991	Naagam		
1992	Snehasagaram		
1992	Chuvapputhalam		
1992	Pramanikal		
1992	Ente Ponnu Thampuran	Servant	
1993	Sthalathe Pradhana Payyans	Marukandam Madhavan's wife	
1993	Golanthara Vartha	Valsala Teacher	
1993	Ponnuchami	Mallika	
1994	Rudraksham		
1994	Gentleman Security	Alamelu	
1994	Bharanakoodam	Excise Minister Parukutty	
1995	Aavarthanam		
1995	Hijack	Head Constable	
1995	Vrudhanmare Sookshikkuka	Mrs. Kuruppu	
1995	Thirumanassu	Thankam	
1997	Asuravamsam	Vasumathy	
2000	Mister Butler		
2004	Thalamelam	Sarah	
2006	Balram vs. Tharadas	Prisoner	
2006	Highway Police		
2012	Ajantha		
2019	Madhaveeyam		
2020	Aashanka		

=== Tamil ===
Year	Title	Role	Notes
1974	Devi Sri Karumari Amman		
1975	Unarchigal	Prostitute	
1979	Allaudinaum Arputha Vilakkum	Allaudin's chinnamma	
1982	Marumagale Vazhga	Lakshmi's mother	
1983	Kashmir Kadhali		
1992	Thevar Magan		
1996	Gopala Gopala		

=== Kannada ===
Year	Title	Role	Notes
1993	Jaga Mechida Huduga		
2012	Ajantha		

=== Telugu ===
Year	Title	Role	Notes
1983	Rudra Kali		

== Television ==
- Hukka Huvva Mikkado (Kairali TV)
- Kadamattathu Kathanar (Asianet) as "Durgamma"
- Krishnakripasagaram (Amrita TV) as "Poothana"
- Vikramadithyan (Asianet)
- Paarijatham (Asianet)
- Indumukhi Chandramathi (Surya TV)

== TV shows ==
- Veettamma
- Rani Maharani
- Innalathe Tharam

== Dubbing ==
- Moonnu Masangalkku Mumpu (1986)
- Ente Sonia (1986)
- Abkari (1988) for Jayamalini
- Bhadrachitta (1989)
- Crime Branch (1989)
- Kaumaara Swapnangal (1991)
- Snehasagaram (1992) for Ragini
- Golantharavartha (1993)
- Kambolam (1994)
- Bharya (1994)
- Kalamasseriyil Kalyanayogam (1995)
- Kalyanji Aanandji (1995)
- Oru Mutham Manimutham (1997)
- Ikkerayanente Manasam (1997)
- Gloriya Fernandez From USA (1998)
- Thachiledathu Chundan (1999)
- Rapid Action Force (2000)
- Chenchayam (2000)
- Gaandharvarathri (2000)
- Nimishangal (2001)
- Driving License (2001)
- Moonam Yamam (2002)
- Melvilasom Seriyanu (2003)
- Veetla Vishesham (2022)- Tamil film for KPAC Lalitha
