= Kalaranjini =

Indian actress

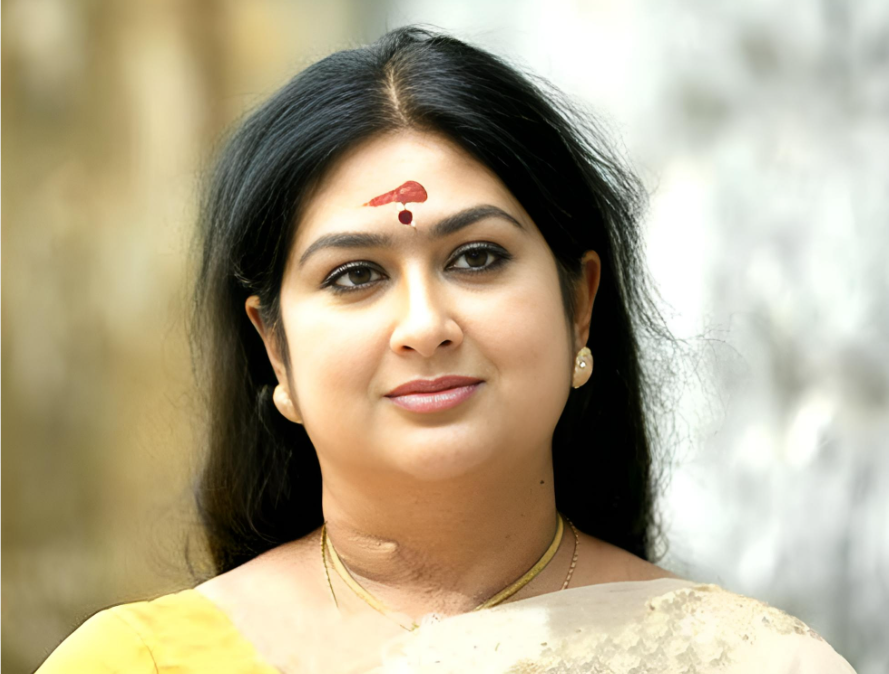
- Born: Kollam
- Occupation: Actress
- Relatives: Sooranad Kunjan Pillai (grandfather); Kalpana (sister); Urvashi (sister)

Kalaranjini is an Indian actress, known for her work in Malayalam cinema. She started her career in the early 1980s.

== Personal life ==
Kalaranjini has two sisters, Kalpana and Urvashi, both of whom are actors. Her two brothers, Kamal Roy and Prince had also acted in a few Malayalam movies.

Prince (Nandu of Layanam fame) committed suicide at the age of 17. In 2016, Kalpana was found unconscious in her hotel room and was immediately taken to the hospital, but died of a heart attack. Kamal Roy (who acted as Ananthapadmanabhan in Kalyana Sougandhikam) died in 2026 at the age of 54 due to heart failure.

Kalaranjini is divorced and has a son, Prince.

== Partial filmography ==
=== Malayalam ===
List of Kalaranjini Malayalam film credits
Year	Title	Role	Notes
1978	Madanolsavam	Child artist	
1979	Edavazhiyile Poocha Minda Poocha	College lecturer	
1979	Sikharangal	Song role	Special appearance
1980	Swantham Enna Padam	Prabha	
1981	Ammakkorumma	Sherly	
1981	Nizhal Yudham	Shobha	
1982	Aasha	Aasha	
1982	Ente Mohangal Poovaninju	Baby	
1982	Gaanam	Ranjini	
1982	Komaram		
1982	Odukkam Thudakkam	Nalini	
1982	Oru Thira Pinneyum Thira	Latha	
1982	Balloon	Chinnu	
1982	Njan Onnu Parayatte	Thankamani	
1982	Yagam		
1983	Aashrayam	Amina	
1983	Bhookambam	Susie	
1983	Ee Vazhi Mathram	Sharada	
1983	Eettillam	Kausalya	
1983	Himavahini	Ponnu	
1983	Nizhal Moodiya Nirangal	Daisy	
1983	Passport	Sainabha	
1983	Ee Yugam		
1984	Ente Nandinikutty	Nandinikutty's mother	
1984	Idavelakku Sesham	Sunitha	
1984	Lakshmana Rekha	Sunitha	
1984	Nishedi	Anitha	
1984	Paavam Krooran	Sheela	
1984	Raajavembaala	Maala	
1984	Theere Pratheekshikkathe	Sreedevi	
1984	Attahaasam	Uma	
1984	Oru Thettinte Katha	Rajani	
1984	Swarna Gopuram		
1985	Kaiyum Thlayum Purathidaruthe		
1985	Suvarna Kshethram		
1986	Ambili Ammavan		
1986	Ashtabandham	Savithri	
1986	Ithramathram	Anitha	
1986	Yuvajanotsavam	Bhagaval Das's Wife	
1987	Amme Bhagavathi	Saraswathi	
1987	Ithrayum Kalam	Molly	
1987	Jaithra Yaathra	Nurse/Minimol's mother	
1987	Kathakku Pinnil	Malathi	
1987	Ponnu	Santhamma	
1987	Vamban	Kala	
1987	Swantham Ennu Karuthi		
1989	Crime Branch	Ambujam	
1991	Koumara Swapnangal	Rajasekharan's wife	
1991	Raagam Anuragam	Indu	
1997	Katha Nayakan		
1997	Swantham Makalkku Snehapoorvam		
1998	Sreekrishnapurathe Nakshathrathilakkam	Aanathavalli	
2002	Kalyanaraman	Saraswathy	
2002	Nandanam	Janaki	
2002	Vasanthamalika	Lakshmiyamma	
2003	Swantham Malavika	Gomathi	
2003	Swapnakoodu	Sophy	
2004	Bunglavil Outha	Rosamma	
2005	Hridayathil Sookshikkan	Nanditha's mother	
2005	Iruvattam Manavaatti	Bhumika's mother	
2005	Kochi Rajavu	Lakshmi	
2005	Annorikkal		
2007	Kangaroo	Cicily	
2007	Sooryan	Sarasu	
2007	Speed Track	Gouri's mother	
2007	Ali Bhai		
2008	Kerala Police	Maria Roy	
2009	Banaras	Malathi	
2009	Ivar Vivahitharayal	Kavya's mother	
2009	Parayan Marannathu	Madhavi	
2009	Puthiya Mukham	Mahi's wife	
2009	Swantham Lekhakan	Shantha	
2009	Mounam		
2009	Patham Nilayile Theevandi		
2010	Patham Adhyayam	Lakshmikutty	
2010	Pulliman	Kamakshi	
2010	Ringtone	Thampuratti	
2011	Ithu Nammude Katha	Sethulakshmi	
2011	Bombay Mittayi		
2011	Kalabha Mazha	Kamashi	
2011	Mohabbath	Panchayat Member, Mariya	
2011	Ninnishtam Ennishtam 2	Sreekuttan's mother	
2011	Cocoon		
2012	Kunjaliyan	Kanambaram	
2012	Mr. Marumakan	Interview board member	
2012	Spanish Masala	Theressa	
2012	The King & the Commissioner	Santha Krishnan Nair	
2013	Aattakatha	Unni's mother	
2013	God for Sale	Priyadarshini	
2013	Jwalamukhikal	Sudha	Short film
2013	Mr. Bean		
2013	Radio		
2013	White Paper	Sumathi	
2014	How Old Are You	Rajeev's mother	
2014	Karnavar	Vijaya's mother	
2014	Mizhi Thurakku		
2014	Parankimala	Appu's mother	
2015	1000 – Oru Note Paranja Katha	Gypsy lady	
2015	Chirakodinja Kinavukal	Sumathi's mother	
2015	Ennu Ninte Moideen	Janaki	
2015	Female Unnikrishnan	Unniyamma	
2015	Jo and the Boy	Mary John	
2017	Georgettan's Pooram	Mercy	
2017	Kambhoji	Antharjanam	
2018	Lolans		
2019	Manoharam	Sreeja's mother	
2020	Sufiyum Sujatayum	Kamala	
2024	Bharathanatyam	Saraswathi	
2026	Bharathanatyam 2 Mohiniyattam	Saraswathi	
2026	Ananthan Kaadu	Parvathy Amma	
TBA	Visitor †	TBA	
TBA	Bharathanatyam 3 Rasaleela †	Saraswathi	

=== Tamil ===
List of Kalaranjini Tamil film credits
Year	Title	Role	Notes
1981	Andru Muthal Indru Varai	Lakshmi	
1981	Aradhanai	Lilly	
1982	Manjal Nila	Vasantha	
1982	Oorum Uravum	Roopa	
1987	Kavalan Avan Kovalan	Pappa	
1987	Paadu Nilave	Lalitha	Guest appearance
1987	Sirai Paravai	Ponnusamy's wife	
1989	Vaai Kozhuppu	Kalpana	
1991	Mookuthi Poomele	Bhuvana	
1995	Chandralekha	Easwari (Chandralekha's mother)	
1995	Murai Mappillai	Raja's mother	
1995	Vishnu	Nirmala	
1996	Mettukudi	Sivakami	
1997	Periya Idathu Mappillai	Chinnavar's wife	
1997	Thaali Pudhusu	Kala	
1998	Iniyavale	Ramanathan's wife	
2012	Ithanai Naalai Engirunthai		
2015	36 Vayadhinile	Tamizhselvan's mother	
2023	Yosi		

=== Other language ===
List of Kalaranjini other language film credits
Year	Title	Role	Language	Notes
1981	Vaadani Malli	Aruma	Telugu	Credited as Kala Rani
1983	Aasha	Prameela	Kannada	
1983	Simham Navvindi	Radha/Latha	Telugu	
1984	Marchandi Mana Chattalu	Damayanthi	Telugu	
1985	Kalaranjani	Ranjani	Telugu	

== Television ==
List of Kalaranjini television credits
Year	Title	Role	Channel	Language	Role/Notes
	Kanimuthu		Jaihind TV	Malayalam	Won – Drishya TV award for Best Actress (Telefilm)
	Thennaliraman		Amrita TV	Malayalam	
	Vismayam		Surya TV	Malayalam	Telefilm
1997	Smarakashilakal			Malayalam	
1997	Doctors	Saranya	Sun TV	Tamil	
1999	Chinna Chinna Aasai : Bandham	Sasi	Sun TV	Tamil	
2003–2004	Manasaputhri	Giri's aunt	Surya TV	Malayalam	
2004	Black and White Season 2	Alice	Asianet	Malayalam	
2004	Megham		Asianet	Malayalam	
2005	Sindoorarekha		Asianet	Malayalam	
2005–2006	Thulabharam	Subhadraamma	Surya TV	Malayalam	
2005–2006	Vikramadithyan	Maharani	Asianet	Malayalam	
2006	Sathi Leelavathi	Rani	Amrita TV	Malayalam	
2006	Lakshyam		Asianet	Malayalam	
2007	Prayanam	Paru teacher	Surya TV	Malayalam	
2007	Daya		Kairali TV	Malayalam	
2007	Makal Old	Sudha	Asianet	Malayalam	
2007	Mandaram	Shameer's mother	Kairali TV	Malayalam	
2007	Velankanni Mathavu	Rachelamma	Surya TV	Malayalam	
2007–2008	Sree Guruvayoorappan	Marathakamma	Surya TV	Malayalam	
2008	Ammakkayi		Surya TV	Malayalam	
2008	Chilluvilakku		Surya TV	Malayalam	
2008	Kanakuyil	Geetha	Asianet	Malayalam	
2008	Sreekrishnaleela		Asianet	Malayalam	
2009	Chandrettanum Shobedathiyum	Shobha	Asianet	Malayalam	
2009	Devimahatymam	Savithri	Asianet	Malayalam	
2009	Sreemahabhagavatham		Asianet	Malayalam	
2009–2010	Vasantham	Thillainayagi (Mangalam's eldest daughter in law)	Sun TV	Tamil	
2009–2012	Vilakku Vacha Nerathula	Saradhamma	Kalaignar TV	Tamil	
2009–2012	Chakkara Bharani	Indiramma	Surya TV	Malayalam	
2011–2014	Kumkumapoovu	Subhadramma (Mahesh's mother)	Asianet	Malayalam	
2012–2015	Sondha Bandham	Rajalakshmi (Prem's mother)	Sun TV	Tamil	
2013–2014	Mama Mappilai		Sun TV	Tamil	
2014	Crime Branch		Kairali TV	Malayalam	
2014–2018	Kalyana Parisu	Gajalakshmi	Sun TV	Tamil	
2015–2017	Moonnumani	Sharadhamma	Flowers TV	Malayalam	Dubbed into Tamil as Moondram Pirai
2016	Manathe Kottaram	Kottarathil Komalavalli	Kairali TV	Malayalam	
2024	Kudumbashree Sharada	Herself	Zee Keralam	Malayalam	

Reality shows

- Lunars Comedy Express (Asianet Plus) as Special judge
- Comedy Stars (Asianet) as Judge

=== Shows / Other works ===
- JB Junction (Kairali TV)
- Shoot N Show (Kairali TV)
- Star Family (Amrita TV)
- Varthakkappuram (Asianet News)
- Ennile Njan (ACV)
- Asianet Film Awards 2016
- Flowers Awards Night
- Malayalam Super Star Nite
- Rim Showtime
- Nana
- Celespot Media
- Mahilaratnam
- Grihalakshmi
