= Snehamulla Simham =

- Poster
- Directed by: Sajan
- Written by: M. D. Ajayghosh; S. N. Swamy (dialogues)
- Screenplay by: S. N. Swamy
- Produced by: P. T. Xavier
- Starring: Mammootty; Nalini; Mukesh; Lalu Alex
- Cinematography: Anandakuttan
- Edited by: V. P. Krishnan
- Music by: Shyam
- Production company: Vijaya Movies
- Distributed by: Vijaya Movies
- Release date: 19 June 1986
- Country: India
- Language: Malayalam

Snehamulla Simham (transl. A lion that loves) is a 1986 Indian Malayalam-language romantic drama film produced by P. T. Xavier under Vijaya Movies, directed by Sajan and written by M. D. Ajayghosh. It stars Mammootty, Nalini, Mukesh and Lalu Alex in lead roles. The film features original songs composed by Shyam, cinematography was done by Anandakuttan. The film revolves around Maya, who falls in love with her professor, Vaishankaran. However, Vaishankaran, an alcoholic doesn't approve of her love. The film is based on the novel written by M. D. Ajayghosh.

== Premise ==
Maya, a confident college student from a wealthy family falls for her recently joined professor Vaishakan. In a college arts festival, Vaishakan criticizes her poem and after that she takes a fancy to him.

Vaishakan from bad experiences in his personal life has become disillusioned, embittered, and anti-authoritarian and does not care much about his life. His fellow professor, Venu an old friend who hasn't seen him in some time, encourages him to give up his alcoholism and pursue a stable family life.

Her family wish for her to marry Mohan who is the son of a family friend and is considered by her family a suitable alliance. In the meantime, Vaisakhan has no interest in Maya's romantic feelings and clashes with her family.

The movie explores Vaishakan's background story and why he has become so embittered. It also explores the experience of a headstrong and confident young woman like Maya in a conventional Kerala household.

== Cast ==
- Mammootty as M. A. Vaishakan
- Nalini as Maya S. Menon
- Mukesh as Mohan Menon
- Lalu Alex as Venu
- Priya as Lathika
- Menaka as Vilasini Venu
- Jose Prakash as Menon
- Santhosh as Hari S. Menon
- Mala Aravindan as Kuttan
- Paravoor Bharathan as Karunakaran Pillai
- Sukumari as Kamalamma
- Prathapachandran as C. R.
- Adoor Bhavani as Paruvamma
- Unnimary as Sudha
- K. P. A. C. Azeez as P. C. Kurup
- Lalithasree as Cameo Appearance
- Kollam Ajith as Cameo Appearance
- Mamukkoya as Cameo Appearance

== Soundtrack ==
=== Songs ===
The music was composed by Shyam and the lyrics were written by Chunakkara Ramankutty.

No.	Song	Singers	Lyrics	Length (m:ss)
1	"Niramezhum Karalin"	Unni Menon	Chunakkara Ramankutty	
2	"Sneham Kothichu"	Ashalatha	Chunakkara Ramankutty	

=== Background Score ===
The background score of this film won rave reviews from critics.
