= Raajavembaala =

- Directed by: K. S. Gopalakrishnan
- Written by: K. S. Gopalakrishnan; Kaval Surendran (dialogues)
- Screenplay by: K. S. Gopalakrishnan
- Produced by: K. S. Gopalakrishnan
- Starring: Ratheesh; Kalaranjini; Anuradha; Balan K. Nair
- Cinematography: K. S. Mani
- Edited by: A. Sukumaran
- Music by: K. J. Joy
- Release date: 4 February 1984
- Country: India
- Language: Malayalam

Raajavembaala is a 1984 Indian Malayalam film, directed and produced by K. S. Gopalakrishnan. The film stars Ratheesh, Kalaranjini, Anuradha and Balan K. Nair in the lead roles. The film has a musical score by K. J. Joy.

== Cast ==
- Ratheesh as Ratheesh
- Bheeman Raghu as Antony
- Vincent as Inspector
- Sudheer as Varghese
- Kalaranjini as Maala
- Anuradha as Neelima
- Balan K. Nair as Williams
- C. I. Paul as George
- Kuthiravattam Pappu as Chakko
- Ravi Menon
- Sathyakala as Nalini
- T. G. Ravi as Abdullah
- Ajayan
- Thikkurissy Sukumaran Nair as Father Charles
- Jagannatha Varma as Commissioner Bhargavan Menon
- K. P. A. C. Azeez as Kangani
- Rani Padmini as Sakkeena
- Thodupuzha Vasanthi as Philomina
- Sasankan Nair
- Badar
- C.Ravi
- Sudhakaran Nair
- Sukumaran Kasargode
- Antony
- Mithun

== Soundtrack ==
The music was composed by K. J. Joy and the lyrics were written by Chunakkara Ramankutty.

No.	Song	Singers	Length (m:ss)
1	"Angemalavaazhunna"	Vani Jairam, K. P. Brahmanandan, Chorus	
2	"Lahari Lahari"	Anitha Reddy	
3	"Malakale Malarukale"	P. Susheela	
