= Vamban =

- Directed by: Hassan
- Starring: Ratheesh; Rohini; Kalaranjini; Anuradha
- Edited by: K. P. Hariharaputhran
- Music by: A. T. Ummer
- Production company: Karthikeya Films
- Distributed by: Karthikeya Films
- Release date: 19 June 1987
- Country: India
- Language: Malayalam

Vamban is a 1987 Indian Malayalam film, directed by Hassan. The film stars Ratheesh, Rohini, Kalaranjini and Anuradha in the lead roles. The film has musical score by A. T. Ummer.This film got in to controversy when the villain misbehaved with Rohini during rape scene shooting.

== Cast ==
- Ratheesh as Ravi
- Rohini as Viji
- Kalaranjini as Kala
- Ranipadmini as Dominic's daughter
- T. G. Ravi as Dominic
- Sathaar as Peter
- Sukumaran as MD Chandrasekharan Nair
- Kuthiravattom Pappu as Sankaran
- Anju as child artist
- Ahalya as Anju
- Sankaradi as Rajan Muthalali
- Bheeman Raghu as Police officer

== Soundtrack ==
The music was composed by A. T. Ummer and the lyrics were written by K. G. Menon and Arifa Hassan.

No.	Song	Singers	Lyrics	Length (m:ss)
1	"Malare"	Vani Jairam	K. G. Menon, Arifa Hassan	
