= Nottam =

- Directed by: Shashi Paravoor
- Written by: Salin Mankuzhy
- Produced by: Film Focus
- Starring: Nedumudi Venu; Jagathi Sreekumar; Arun; Samvrutha Sunil
- Cinematography: K. G. Jayan
- Edited by: Venugopal
- Music by: M. Jayachandran
- Distributed by: Focus
- Release date: 20 January 2006
- Country: India
- Language: Malayalam

Nottam is a 2006 Malayalam film starring Ajir Shujahi, Arun, Nedumudi Venu, Jagathi Sreekumar and Samvrutha Sunil in the lead roles. The film has been directed by Sasi Paravoor and written by Salin Mankuzhy. K.G. Jayan was the cinematographer and V Venugopal, the editor.

== Plot ==
Vasudeva Chakyar is a well known Koodiyattam artist. Aby George, a friend of his son Vishnu, comes home to see him. Chakyar initially denied Aby's desire to shoot Koodiyattam but later agreed. Later, Vasudeva Chakyar got several venues to perform Koodiyattam in India and abroad.

== Cast ==
- Ajir Shujahi as Vishnu (voiceover by Sarath Das)
- Arun as Aby George
- Nedumudi Venu as Vaasudevan Chakyar
- Jagathy Sreekumar as Unni / Unnichakyar
- Samvrutha Sunil as Gouri
- Margi Sathi as Saraswathi
- M. R. Gopakumar as Nambeeshan
- Arathy as Abhirami / Thumbi
- Janardhanan as Menon
- Narayanankutty
- Vanitha Krishnachandran
- P. Sreekumar
- Salu Kuttanad

== Crew ==
The film has been directed by Sasi Paravoor and written by Salin mankuzhy, produced by the banner Film Focus. Cinematography is by K. G. Jayan and Venugopal is in charge of the editing.

== Soundtrack ==
All music is composed by M. Jayachandran

No.	Title	Lyrics	Artist(s)	Length
1.	"Pacha Panamthathe"	Ponkunnam Damodaran	K. J. Yesudas
2.	"Pacha Panamthathe"	Ponkunnam Damodaran	Sujatha Mohan
3.	"Mayangi Poyi"	Kaithapram Damodaran	K. S. Chithra
4.	"Melle"	Kaithapram Damodaran	M. Jayachandran
5.	"Mayangi Poyi"	Kaithapram Damodaran	K. K. Nishad
6.	"Mayangi Poyi"		Instrumental

== Awards ==
=== Kerala State Film Awards-2005 ===
Award	Nominee	Performance
Best Female Playback Singer	K. S. Chithra	"Mayangi Poyi"
Best Male Playback Singer	M. Jayachandran	"Melle"
