= Cabaret Dancer =

1986 Indian Malayalam film directed by N. Sankaran Nair

- Directed by: N. Sankaran Nair
- Written by: Sastha; Salim Cherthala (dialogues)
- Screenplay by: Salim Cherthala
- Produced by: S. Kumar
- Starring: Anuradha; M. G. Soman; Santhosh; Sathaar
- Cinematography: Dhananjayan
- Edited by: N. Gopalakrishnan
- Music by: Shyam
- Production company: Sastha Krupa
- Distributed by: Sastha Krupa
- Release date: 15 November 1986
- Country: India
- Language: Malayalam

Cabaret Dancer is a 1986 Indian Malayalam film, directed by N. Sankaran Nair and produced by S. Kumar. The film stars Anuradha, M. G. Soman, Santhosh and Sathaar in the lead roles. The film has musical score by Shyam.

== Cast ==
- Anuradha
- M. G. Soman
- Santhosh
- Sathaar
- Babitha
- Balan K. Nair
- Janardanan
- Lalithasree
