= Nila (1994 film) =

- Poster
- Directed by: Nambirajan
- Written by: Nambirajan
- Produced by: S. Sreedevi; S. Vengatesh
- Starring: Jayaram; Vineetha
- Cinematography: A. Sabhabathy
- Edited by: A. P. Manivannan
- Music by: Deva
- Production company: Shri Sairam Arts
- Release date: 24 November 1994
- Running time: 140 minutes
- Country: India
- Language: Tamil

Nila (transl. Moon) is a 1994 Indian Tamil-language romance film directed by Nambirajan. The film stars Jayaram and Vineetha, with an ensemble supporting cast including Yuvarani, Goundamani, Senthil, Gandhimathi, Vijayakumar, Manjula Vijayakumar and Prakash Raj. It was released on 24 November 1994. The film was remade in Telugu as Maa Ayana Bangaram (1997).

== Plot ==
Ayyanar is a kind-hearted person and a kulfi street vendor. One day, out of pity Ayyanar gives refuge to a girl suffering from amnesia and behaving like a child. Ayyanar and Aatha, who is like his own mother, take care of her. Ayyanar names the girl "Nila". In the meantime, the medical student Subha falls in love with Ayyanar. Living with a woman without getting married is not well seen, so Ayyanar and Nila get married. Afterwards, Ayyanar and Nila live happily, Nila even becomes pregnant. After her delivery, Nila regains her memory and is transferred in a better hospital. There, Nila meets her real family and her fiancé.

The real name of Nila is Ramya. She lived with her parents in Delhi and she was engaged to Ramesh. One day, an earthquake struck in Delhi and they were all separated, her family thought that she was dead.

When Ayyanar comes to see his wife, Nila in the first place rejects him but she then decides to live as "Nila" with Ayyanar and their newborn baby. What transpires next forms the rest of the story.

== Cast ==
- Jayaram as Ayyanar
- Vineetha as Nila / Ramya
- Yuvarani as Subha
- Goundamani
- Senthil as Dinku
- Gandhimathi as Aatha
- Vijayakumar as Vijay, Ramya's father
- Manjula Vijayakumar as Lakshmi, Ramya's mother
- Prakash Raj as Ramesh
- Jai Ganesh as Subha's father
- Idichapuli Selvaraj as Munusamy
- Karikalan as Vadivelu
- Ponnambalam
- LIC Narasimhan
- Loose Mohan
- Bonda Mani
- M. R. Krishnamurthy
- Krishnamoorthy
- Sanjay
- Pasi Narayanan
- Thideer Kannaiah
- Thayir Vadai Desigan
- Vellai Subbaiah
- Bayilvan Ranganathan
- Velmurugan
- Ramakrishna Iyer
- Sahadevan
- Mahadevan
- Kavithasri
- Pasi Sathya

== Soundtrack ==
The soundtrack was composed by Deva, with lyrics written by Vaali.

Song	Singer(s)	Duration
"Mele Idi Idikkum"	Mano, Swarnalatha	5:20
"Raasa Mela Aasai"	S. P. Balasubrahmanyam, K. S. Chithra	5:06
"Rukku Namba"	K. S. Chithra	5:04
"Naidu Hallu"	Mano	4:46
"Chinna Chinna"	Mano, Jayaram	4:57
"Soodaaga Suttu"	Gangai Amaran, Malgudi Subha	5:03

== Reception ==
On 25 November 1994, Malini Mannath, writing for The Indian Express, called it an extended version of Moondram Pirai, adding, "the director has managed to keep proceedings interesting".
