= Santhosh K. Nayar =

Indian film actor (1960–2026)

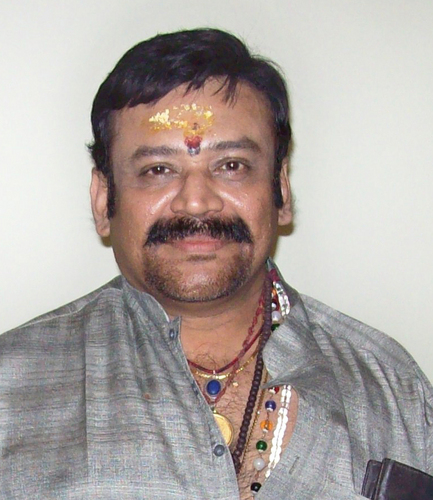
- Born: Santhosh Kesavan Nayar; 12 November 1960; Trivandrum, Kerala, India
- Died: 5 May 2026 (aged 65); Enathu, Kerala, India
- Occupation: Actor
- Years active: 1982–2026
- Spouse: Subhasree V.
- Children: 1

Santhosh Kesavan Nayar (12 November 1960 – 5 May 2026) was an Indian actor who appeared in Malayalam cinema. He acted in more than 100 films, primarily in antagonistic roles.

== Early life and education ==
Santhosh hailed from Trivandrum, India. He was the only son of retired headmaster C. N. Kesavan Nayar and P. Rajalakshmiamma, who is also a retired teacher. He grew up along with his two sisters in Pettah, Thiruvananthapuram. Santhosh was brought up by his maternal grandparents, advocate K. S. Chellappan Pillai and B. Parukuttyamma, when his parents left for Ethiopia on deputation.

Nayar completed his schooling at St. Joseph's Higher Secondary School, Trivandrum. He initially enrolled in an engineering programme at Chinmaya Vishwa Vidyapeeth, but discontinued after one year. He subsequently pursued undergraduate and postgraduate degrees in mathematics at Mahatma Gandhi College, where he also served as editor of the college magazine. He was involved in campus politics through the Democratic Students Union (DSU), the student wing of the National Democratic Party (NDP), and served as its president. Concurrently, he was associated with the Rashtriya Swayamsevak Sangh, where he held organisational roles, including shikshak and mukhya shikshak.

Both his sisters turned became gynaecologists while he wanted to pursue a career as an actor.

== Film career ==
Santhosh began his acting career while completing his final year of bachelor's degree, securing his first role through an audition. He made his debut in the Malayalam film Ithu Njangalude Katha (1982), directed by P. G. Viswambharan, in which he portrayed one of five principal protagonists. The film was a commercial success. In subsequent years, Nayar portrayed "semi-villain" roles.

His performance as a villain in Ivide Thudangunnu (1984), another box office success, marked a turning point, leading to a series of similar roles. He also played a recognizable villain role in April 18 the same year. Despite this emerging typecasting, he played leading roles in Kothi Theerumvare and Ithu Nalla Thamasha (both 1985). In an interview with Mathrubhumi, he stated that at the peak of his career he had worked in as many as 42 films within a single year. He played a positive role in Yuvajanotsavam (1986). Nayar's breakthrough performance came with the role of Lawrence in Irupatham Noottandu (1987), which significantly enhanced his public recognition. He played a comedic role in Nagarangalil Chennu Raparkam (1989).

In 2005, Nayar took a four-year hiatus from acting in an effort to avoid typecasting. Following his return, he was cast in comparatively minor roles, often limited to a few scenes. Nevertheless, he played noticeable characters in Bus Conductor (2006), Simhasanam (2012), and Thiruvambadi Thamban (2012). He later played a humorous role in Proprietors: Kammath & Kammath (2013). The 2026 film Bharathanatyam 2 Mohiniyattam was his last release while alive. The film was a commercial success.

== Personal life ==
Santhosh married Subhasree V., a high-school teacher by profession; they had a daughter, Rajasree S. Nayar.

On 5 May 2026, Santhosh died of a heart attack while undergoing treatment at a hospital in Enathu following a car collision at Puthussery, Adoor. He was 65.

== Filmography ==
Year	Title	Role	Notes
1982	Ithu Njangalude Katha	Joseph	
1983	Nanayam	Babu's friend	
1983	Pinnilavu	Basheer	
1984	Ivide Thudangunnu	Rajan	
1984	April 18	Jacob	
1984	Nishedhi	Sunny	
1984	Oru Sumangaliyude Katha		
1984	Kurishuyudham	Simon	
1984	Sandyakkenthinu Sindhooram		
1985	Iniyum Kadha Thudarum	Sandeep	
1985	Ee Lokam Evide Kure Manushyar		
1985	Ivide Ee Theerathu	Raju	
1985	Kandu Kandarinju	College student Sajan	
1985	Orikkal Oridathu	Baby Thomas	
1985	Eeran Sandhya	Freddy Louis	
1985	Aanakkorumma	Vikraman	
1985	Snehicha Kuttathinu	Vinod	
1985	Ithu Nalla Thamasha	Vjayakrishnan/Kuttappan	
1985	Vasantha Sena	Mathews	
1985	Dheivatheyorthu	Shaji	
1985	Akalathe Ambili	Edwin	
1985	Upaharam	Vinod	
1985	Angadikkappurathu	Raghu	
1985	Kaattuthee		
1985	Kiraatham	Murali	
1985	Omanikkan Ormavaikkan		
1985	Kothi Theerumvare		
1986	Ithile Iniyum Varu	Kasim	
1986	Nandi Veendum Varika		
1986	Yuvajanotsavam	Nissar	
1986	Ente Shabdham	Abu	
1986	Snehamulla Simham	Hari S. Menon	
1986	Cabaret Dancer		
1987	Irupatham Noottandu		
1987	Agni Muhurtham	Subair	
1987	Maanasa Maine Varu		
1988	Charavalayam	Karumban	
1988	Ayitham	Govindankutty	
1988	Oru Muthassi Katha	Karuppayyan	
1988	Oru Vivaada Vishayam	james	
1988	1921	Keshavankutty	
1989	Peruvannapurathe Visheshangal	Chandukkutty Kuruppu	
1989	Crime Branch	Shaji	
1989	Najangalude Kochu Doctor	Rajeevan	
1990	Kadathanadan Ambadi	Thambikkutti	
1990	Nagarangalil Chennu Raparkam	Rambo's assistant	
1991	Koodikazhcha	Viswanatha Panikkar	
1991	Vishnulokam	Sathyan	
1991	Koumara Swapnangal		
1991	Kilukkam	Police Inspector	
1991	Kizhakkunarum Pakshi	Satheeshan	
1992	Thalastaanam	Bharathan	
1992	Maanyanmar	Sathyan	
1992	Aardram	Moideen	
1992	Kauravar	Maathu	
1992	Valayam		
1992	Radhachakram		
1993	Customs Diary	Babu	
1993	Dhruvam	Hassan	
1993	Ammayane Sathyam	Hassan	
1994	Gaandeevam		
1994	Sainyam		
1994	Avan Ananthapadmanaabhan		
1994	Paalayam	Thommi	
1994	Chukkan		
1994	Kadal		
1994	Dadha	Pappan	
1995	Sindoora Rekha	Chellappan	
1995	Oru Abhibhashakante Case Diary	Chacko	
1995	Maanthrikam	Beeran	
1995	Chantha		
1995	Thumboli Kadappuram		
1999	Crime File	SI Karthav	
1999	My Dear Karadi	Sathyanathan	
1999	The Godman	Moideen	
2000	Kaathara		
2002	Oomappenninu Uriyadappayyan	Cameo	
2002	Krishna Gopalakrishna	Jangathnathan	
2004	Runway	Achayan	
2004	Natturajavu	Alex	
2004	Freedom		
2004	Vellinakshathram		
2004	Vettam	Karunan	
2005	Kochi Rajavu	Karimbarakkal Divakaran	
2005	Chandrolsavam	Sahadevan	
2005	The Tiger	Rajath Naidu	
2005	Bus Conductor		
2006	Lion	SI Prathapa Varma	
2006	Mahasamudram	Rival Player	
2006	Chess	Crime Branch	
2007	Khaki	Sukumaran	
2007	Alibhai	Shankaran	
2008	Pramukhan		
2009	I. G. – Inspector General	ADGP Yoonus IPS	
2010	Kaaryasthan	Puthezhathu Vijayan	
2010	Pokkiriraja	Divakaran	
2010	Valiyangadi	SI Abdul Jabbar	
2010	Koottukkar	CR Rajan	
2011	Venicile Vyapari	SI Karikkan George	
2012	Bhoomiyude Avakashikal		
2012	Simhasanam	Balan	
2012	Mayamohini	Sub Registar	
2012	Thiruvambadi Thamban	Parameshwaran	
2012	Madirasi	Udumpi Mani	
2013	Nakhangal		
2013	Proprietors: Kammath & Kammath	DYSP George	
2013	Sound Thoma	Raghava Panicker	
2013	Sringaravelan	Avarachan Muthalali	
2013	Ginger	SI Ajith Kumar	
2014	On The Way		
2014	Cousins	Rajarajan	
2016	Pa.Va		
2018	Drama		
2021	Aarattu	Bhadran	
2023	1921: Puzha Muthal Puzha Vare	Abdullakutty	
2026	Bharathanatyam 2 Mohiniyattam	Temple committee member	

== Television ==
- Swapnam – Asianet
- Sreekrishnan – Surya TV
