= Dheeran =

- Directed by: K. S. Gopalakrishnan
- Starring: Ratheesh; Unnimary; Bheeman Raghu; Lalithasree
- Music by: A. T. Ummer
- Release date: 27 March 1987
- Country: India
- Language: Malayalam

Dheeran is a 1987 Indian Malayalam film, directed by K. S. Gopalakrishnan. The film stars Ratheesh, Unnimary, Bheeman Raghu and Lalithasree in the lead roles. The film has musical score by A. T. Ummer.

== Cast ==
- Ratheesh
- Unnimary
- Bheeman Raghu
- Lalithasree

== Soundtrack ==
The music was composed by A. T. Ummer and the lyrics were written by Poovachal Khader.

No.	Song	Singers	Lyrics	Length (m:ss)
1	"Kaanthaari Mulakarachu"	P. Jayachandran	Poovachal Khader	
