= Omanakkunju =

- Directed by: A. B. Raj
- Written by: Thuravoor Moorthy; KP Kottarakkara (dialogues)
- Screenplay by: K. P. Kottarakkara
- Produced by: K. P. Kottarakkara
- Starring: Madhu; Sheela; Adoor Bhasi; Jose Prakash
- Cinematography: P. B. Mani
- Edited by: K. Sankunni
- Music by: M. K. Arjunan
- Production company: Ganesh Pictures
- Distributed by: Ganesh Pictures
- Release date: 24 October 1975
- Country: India
- Language: Malayalam

Omanakkunju is a 1975 Indian Malayalam-language film, directed by A. B. Raj and produced by K. P. Kottarakkara. The film stars Madhu, Sheela, Adoor Bhasi and Jose Prakash in the lead roles. The film has musical score by M. K. Arjunan. The film was a remake of the Tamil film Kuzhanthaikkaga, which itself was a remake of the Telugu film Papa Kosam.

== Cast ==
- Madhu
- Sheela
- Adoor Bhasi
- Jose Prakash
- Paul Vengola
- Sukumaran
- Baby Babitha
- Janardanan
- Jayamalini
- Mallika Sukumaran
- N. Govindankutty
- Sudheer
- Vanchiyoor Radha

== Soundtrack ==
The music was composed by M. K. Arjunan with lyrics by Sreekumaran Thampi.

| No. | Song | Singers | Lyrics | Length (m:ss) |
|---|---|---|---|---|
| 1 | "Bhagavadgeethayum Sathyageetham" | K. J. Yesudas, Chandrabhanu, Jolly Abraham | Sreekumaran Thampi | |
| 2 | "Ponnin Chingamegham" | P. Susheela | Sreekumaran Thampi | |
| 3 | "Ponnum Chingamegham" | K. J. Yesudas, K. P. Brahmanandan | Sreekumaran Thampi | |
| 4 | "Swapnathilinnale" | Vani Jairam | Sreekumaran Thampi | |
