= Kiraatham =

- Directed by: K. S. Gopalakrishnan
- Screenplay by: K. S. Gopalakrishnan
- Starring: Ratheesh; Santhosh; Captain Raju
- Edited by: A. Sukumaran
- Music by: Kannur Rajan
- Production company: Margi Creation
- Distributed by: Margi Creation
- Release date: 18 January 1985
- Country: India
- Language: Malayalam

Kiraatham is a 1985 Indian Malayalam film, directed by K. S. Gopalakrishnan. The film stars Ratheesh, Santhosh and Captain Raju in the lead roles. The film has musical score by Kannur Rajan.

== Cast ==
- Ratheesh as C. I. Hassan
- Santhosh as Murali
- Prathapachandran as Prathapan
- Bahadoor as Musliyar
- Bheeman Raghu as Radhakrishnan
- Devan as Artist
- Justin as Chief engineer Prabhakaran Nair
- Kaduvakulam Antony as Narayanan Pilla
- Poojappura Ravi as Kuttan Pilla
- Sudheer as Adv. Ramakrishnan Nair
- Vincent as Magistrate
- Pattom Sadan as Santhappan
- Anuradha as Anu
- Valsala Menon as Kamalam
- Lalithasree as Mariya
- Khadeeja as Mariyamma
- Silk Smitha as Dancer

== Soundtrack ==
The music was composed by Kannur Rajan and the lyrics were written by Bharanikkavu Sivakumar.

No.	Song	Singers	Lyrics	Length (m:ss)
1	"Chum Chum Thaara"		Bharanikkavu Sivakumar	
2	"Kannukalil"	Vani Jairam	Bharanikkavu Sivakumar	
3	"Neeyorajantha Shilppam"	K. P. Brahmanandan, Lathika	Bharanikkavu Sivakumar	
