= Muthaaram =

- Old Montage
- Genre: Soap opera Police; Drama
- Written by: Pa. Raghavan
- Screenplay by: Devi Bala
- Directed by: R.Ganesh (1-20); Sundar K. Vijayan (21-564)
- Creative director: Siddhiq
- Starring: Devayani; Vijayalakshmi; Neenu Karthika; J.Lalitha; Sathyapriya; Dr. Shaju; Kamal Kandh; Raja; Vineetha; Manjari; Suresh Krishnamurthy; Vimal; Rindhya
- Theme music composer: Dhina (Title Song); Rajesh Ramalingam (Background Song)
- Opening theme: "Ovvoru Pennum" (Vocals); Shweta Mohan; M. G. Sreekumar; Dhina; Vairamuthu (Lyrics)
- Country of origin: India
- Original language: Tamil
- No. of seasons: 2
- No. of episodes: 564

Production
- Producer: Siddhiq
- Production location: Tamil Nadu
- Cinematography: R.K.Vikraman
- Camera setup: Multi-camera
- Running time: approx. 22-29 minutes per episode
- Production company: Cine Times Entertainment

Original release
- Network: Sun TV(2011-2014)re-telecast (2026-present)
- Release: 14 November 2011 – 25 January 2014

Related
- Preceded by:- Metti Oli Re-Aired; Succeeded by:- Maragatha Veenai

Muthaaram is a 2011-2014 Indian Tamil-language soap opera starring Devayani, Vijayalakshmi, Neenu Karthika, Dr. Shaju, Sathyapriya, Manjari and Pooja Lokesh. It aired on Sun TV 14 November 2011 to 25 January 2014 on Monday to Friday for 564 episodes. Later extended up to Saturday.

It was produced by Cine Times Entertainment and director by R.Ganesh and Sundar K. Vijayan . The title track was composed by Dhina and sung by Shweta Mohan and M. G. Sreekumar and Lyrics by Vairamuthu.

== Plot ==
Mutharam's lead is a Police Officer who fights against criminals is her past life and feels guilty of being a criminal's daughter. Due to some twists and turns she is forced to wear the uniform again. Her fight against her old and new enemies is the story line.

== Cast ==
Main cast

- Devayani (Episodes: 1-388)/ Vijayalakshmi (389-518)/ Neenu Karthika (Episodes: 530-564) (after plastic surgery) as Ranjini Murali and Sivaranjani Shridhar
- Dr.Shaju as Murali (Ranjini's 1st husband)
- Kamal Kandh as Shiva (Ranjini's 2nd Husband)
- Senu as Shridhar (Shivaranjani's husband)
- Raja as Surya (Murali's younger brother)
- Shabnum/Vinitha as Madhu (Surya's younger sister)
- Murali Dharan as Ganesh (Shandy's Ex husband)
- Sathyapriya as Saradha (Episodes: 2-564)

=== Additional cast ===
- Manjari Vinodhini as Mangai (Episodes: 150-389) (Antagonist)
- Sharath as Mangai's husband
- Neepa (Episodes: 200-378) / Pooja Lokesh (Episodes: 395-562) as Sandhiya aka Sandy
- Sumathi Sree as Shandy's Aunty
- Joker Thulasi as Dharmalingam
- Shyam Sundhar as Suresh (Episodes: 443-564)
- Afsar Babu as Shandy's father
- Anuradha as Rajalakshmi (Shandy's mother) (Episodes:390-559)
- Rindhya as Geetha (Shandy's sister)
- Vimal as Rindhya's Husband
- Swaminathan as Vimal (Puspha's Husband (Episodes: 2-564)
- Bhavani / J.Lalitha as Santha (Ranjani's mother)
- Suresh Krishnamoorthy as Ranjani and Sivaranjani's Father
- Unknown as Gomathy
- Ramya Shankar as Aishwarya (Episodes: 2-564)
- Vaijayanthi as Karthika, Aiswarya's Sister
- R.Radha as Bramma's ex fiancé
- Navindhar as Bramma
- Guhan Shanmugam as Raja Raman
- Divya Bharathi as Pusphalatha
- 'Kambar' Jayaraman as Vimal's Father Puspha's uncle
- Sheela\Deepa as Aiswarya's Mother
- Ravi Varma as Aishwarya's Father
- K.Veera as Samiappan
- Jeyamani as Udaiappan
- Udumalai Ravi as Ravi Kumar
- Baby jashika
