= Railway Cross =

- Directed by: K. G. Gopalakrishnan
- Starring: Anuradha; Bheeman Raghu
- Edited by: A. Sukumaran
- Music by: A. T. Ummer
- Release date: 7 November 1986
- Country: India
- Language: Malayalam

Railway Cross is a 1986 Indian Malayalam film, directed by K. G. Gopalakrishnan. The film stars Anuradha and Bheeman Raghu in the lead roles. The film has musical score by A. T. Ummer.

== Cast ==
- Anuradha
- Bheeman Raghu

== Soundtrack ==
The music was composed by A. T. Ummer and the lyrics were written by Poovachal Khader.

No.	Song	Singers	Lyrics	Length (m:ss)
1	"Lahari Thanna Marane"	Sunanda	Poovachal Khader	
2	"Puthiya Bhoomiyil"	Unni Menon	Poovachal Khader	
