= Snehicha Kuttathinu =

- Directed by: P. K. Joseph
- Written by: Pappanamkodu Lakshmanan
- Screenplay by: Pappanamkodu Lakshmanan
- Produced by: T. K. Balachandran
- Starring: Prem Nazir; Seema; Ratheesh; Santhosh; Shubha
- Cinematography: Ramakrishnan
- Edited by: K. Narayanan
- Music by: A. T. Ummer
- Production company: Teakebees
- Distributed by: Teakebees
- Release date: 18 July 1985
- Country: India
- Language: Malayalam

Snehicha Kuttathinu is a 1985 Indian Malayalam-language film, directed by P. K. Joseph and produced by T. K. Balachandran. The film stars Prem Nazir, Seema, Ratheesh, Santhosh and Shubha. The film has musical score by A. T. Ummer.

== Cast ==
- Prem Nazir as Mohandas
- Seema as Yamuna
- Ratheesh as Rajendran
- Santhosh as Vinod
- Shubha as Saraswathi
- Soumya (actress) as Ramani
- Prathapachandran as Krishna Pilla
- Aruna as Sulochana
- M. G. Soman as Sudhakaran
- Poojappura Ravi as Ramunni Ashan
- Santhakumari as Kausalya
- Sreenath as Satheesh Chandran
- Sumithra as Sumathi
- T. G. Ravi as Kuttan nair
- T. K. Balachandran as Advocate

== Soundtrack ==
The music was composed by A. T. Ummer and the lyrics were written by Mankombu Gopalakrishnan.

No.	Song	Singers	Lyrics	Length (m:ss)
1	"Ambala Vilakkukal"	K. J. Yesudas	Mankombu Gopalakrishnan	
2	"Naale Veluppinu"	K. J. Yesudas	Mankombu Gopalakrishnan	
