= Penn Simham =

- Directed by: Crossbelt Mani
- Produced by: SR Enterprises
- Starring: Ratheesh; Anuradha; Kuthiravattam Pappu; Silk Smitha
- Music by: Guna Singh
- Production company: SR Enterprises
- Distributed by: SR Enterprises
- Release date: 19 March 1986
- Country: India
- Language: Malayalam

Penn Simham is a 1986 Indian Malayalam-language film, directed by Crossbelt Mani and produced by SR Enterprises. The film stars Ratheesh and Silk Smitha. The film has musical score by Guna Singh.

== Cast ==
- Ratheesh
- Balan K. Nair
- Silk Smitha
- Disco Shanti
- Kuthiravattam Pappu
- Prathapachandran
- Nellikode Bhaskaran
- Jayamalini
- Anuradha
- Meena (actress)

== Soundtrack ==
The music of the Movie was composed by Guna Singh with lyrics by Sreekumaran Thampi.

No.	Song	Singers	Lyrics	Length (m:ss)
1	"Aakaasha Swapnamo"	K. S. Chithra, Jolly Abraham	Sreekumaran Thampi	
2	"Ayyayyo"	K. S. Chithra	Sreekumaran Thampi	
3	"Pachappattu Saari"	K. S. Chithra	Sreekumaran Thampi	
4	"Ponnurukki Poomalayil"	K. S. Chithra, Jolly Abraham	Sreekumaran Thampi	
5	"Sukham Sukham"	K. S. Chithra	Sreekumaran Thampi	
