= Agni Muhurtham =

1987 film

- Directed by: Soman
- Written by: K. B. Saseendran & Soman; Mosses (dialogues)
- Screenplay by: Mosses
- Produced by: Soman
- Starring: Urvashi; Ratheesh; Santhosh; Mala Aravindan
- Cinematography: J. Williams
- Edited by: K. Sankunni
- Music by: S. P. Venkatesh
- Production company: Navayuga Films
- Distributed by: Navayuga Films
- Release date: 6 August 1987
- Country: India
- Language: Malayalam

Agni Muhurtham is a 1987 Indian Malayalam-language film, directed and produced by Soman. The film stars Urvashi, Ratheesh, Santhosh and Mala Aravindan in the lead roles. The film has musical score by S. P. Venkatesh.

== Plot ==
Sudha, the daughter of an esteemed businessman, marries Vinayan, a small-time worker. After Vinayan takes the reigns of the family business in his hands, his father-in-law is found dead, and he is framed for murder.

== Cast ==
- Urvashi as Sudha
- Ratheesh as Vinayan, Sudha's Husband
- Ragini as Shyni, Vinayan's Sister
- Jose Prakash as Sudha's Father
- Baby Shibitha as Resmimol, Sudha's Daughter
- Santhosh as Ramu
- Mala Aravindan as Balan, Police SP
- Soorya as Devaki aka Roshni
- Jose as Shyni's Husband (Cameo)

== Soundtrack ==
The music was composed by S. P. Venkatesh and the lyrics were written by Balu Kiriyath.

No.	Song	Singers	Lyrics	Length
1	"Arayannathooval"	K. S. Chithra	Balu Kiriyath	4:25
2	"Manjaninja Maamalayil"	Unni Menon, Baby Sangeetha	Balu Kiriyath	5:18
3	"Manjaninja Maamalayil"	K. S. Chithra, Unni Menon	Balu Kiriyath	5:21
4	"Manjaniyum" (Humming)	K. S. Chithra	Balu Kiriyath	0:53
