= Chandralekha (1995 film) =

- Theatrical release poster
- Directed by: Nambirajan
- Written by: Nambirajan
- Produced by: N. Sreedevi
- Starring: Vijay; Vanitha Vijayakumar
- Cinematography: K. S. Selvaraj
- Edited by: R. Bhaskaran
- Music by: Ilaiyaraaja
- Production company: Shri Sairam Arts
- Release date: 23 October 1995
- Running time: 136 minutes
- Country: India
- Language: Tamil

Chandralekha is a 1995 Indian Tamil-language romantic drama film, directed by Nambirajan. Starring Vijay and Vanitha Vijayakumar in her debut, the film revolves around an orthodox Brahmin girl falling in love with a Muslim boy, Rahim, but their families do not accept it. The lovers try to elope and are caught by militants in the forest. Chandralekha was released on 23 October 1995, during Diwali, and did not perform well at the box office.

== Plot ==
Chandralekha, a sheltered girl from an orthodox Brahmin community, meets Rahim, a free-spirited Muslim boy, at a local bookstore, and the two form a strong connection. Rahim's friend Salima, who is secretly in love with Rahim, is disappointed to learn of his feelings for Chandralekha. Jealous, Salima confides in her older brother Jamal and asks for his assistance in securing Rahim's love for herself.

Jamal and Mustafa, Rahim's older brother, plan to establish an engagement between Rahim and Salima without Rahim's knowledge. Believing that Rahim would eventually accept the engagement, they thought it was the best way to preserve family honour and preserve the social order.

Rahim and Chandralekha's families discover their relationship and vehemently oppose it. Bound by the traditions and religious beliefs of their respective communities, they refuse to accept an interfaith marriage between a Brahmin and a Muslim.

Rahim and Chandralekha decide to escape the disapproval of their families and elope. On their journey, Rahim and Chandralekha are captured in the forest by a group of militants. They are eventually freed by the police and return home. Meanwhile, Mustafa, moved by Rahim and Chandra's love, urges the families to accept the marriage.

The pain over Rahim's rejection has pushed Salima to the brink of insanity. Overwhelmed by his sister's suffering, Jamal attacks and kills Rahim and Chandralekha. In her final moments of life Chandralekha expresses her wish to be buried beside Rahim. The policemen, who are present at the murder, shoot and kill Jamal.

The people of the village honour Chandralekha's wish, burying Rahim and Chandralekha side by side.

== Cast ==
- Vijay as Rahim Rowther
- Vanitha Vijayakumar as Chandra
- Sindhu as Suhara Raziya
- Jaishankar as Ibrahim Rowther
- Sarath Babu as Sathyaraj Iyer
- Ponnambalam as Mustafa Rowther
- Karan as Jamal Rowther
- Senthil as Ulaganathan
- Vadivelu as Sundaram Iyer
- Sabitha Anand as Fathima
- Kalaranjini as Chandralekha's mother
- Kamala Kamesh as Chandralekha's aunt
- Sri Kala as Chandralekha's friend
- LIC Narasimhan as Ramachandran
- Pasi Narayanan as Village Man
- Sanjeev as Salim, Rahim's friend
- Karnaa Radha

== Production ==
The film was shot in Delhi, Agra, Kulu Manali, and Talakonam. Before the filming of the song "Allah Un Unnai", Vijay refused to film due to being discontent over his costume, until his mother Shoba persuaded him.

== Soundtrack ==
The music was composed by Ilaiyaraaja.

Song	Singers	Lyrics	Length
"Adikkadi Thudikum"	Swarnalatha	Kamakodiyan	5:28
"Adi Aathadi"	K. S. Chithra	Panchu Arunachalam	5:03
"Allah Un Aanai"	P. Unnikrishnan, Preethi Uttamsingh	Vaali	6:02
"Anal thanil vaadidum"	Bhavatharini	Kamakodiyan	6:00
"Arumbum Thalire"	Arunmozhi, Geetha	Vaali	4:49
"Arumbum Thalire II"	P. Unnikrishnan	Vaali	0:47
"Sangili"	Mano, K. S. Chithra	Muthulingam	5:35
"Tharai Varamal"	P. Unnikrishnan, Geetha, Arunmozhi	Vaali	1:48
"Vanji Ponnu"	K. S. Chithra	Panchu Arunachalam	5:19

== Reception ==
Thulasi of Kalki wrote that the director seems to have thought he was dealing with a huge thing. The story is about love beyond religion. In this one thing, the man has felt too happy but left all the other things together with the fort, the wall, and the trench. D. S. Ramanujam of The Hindu wrote that the director "banks mostly on Vijay [...] to produce the results with his youthful looks and fighting abilities," although Vanitha "does not put sufficient efforts in to acting the role of a heroine".
