= Jolly Abraham =

Indian singer

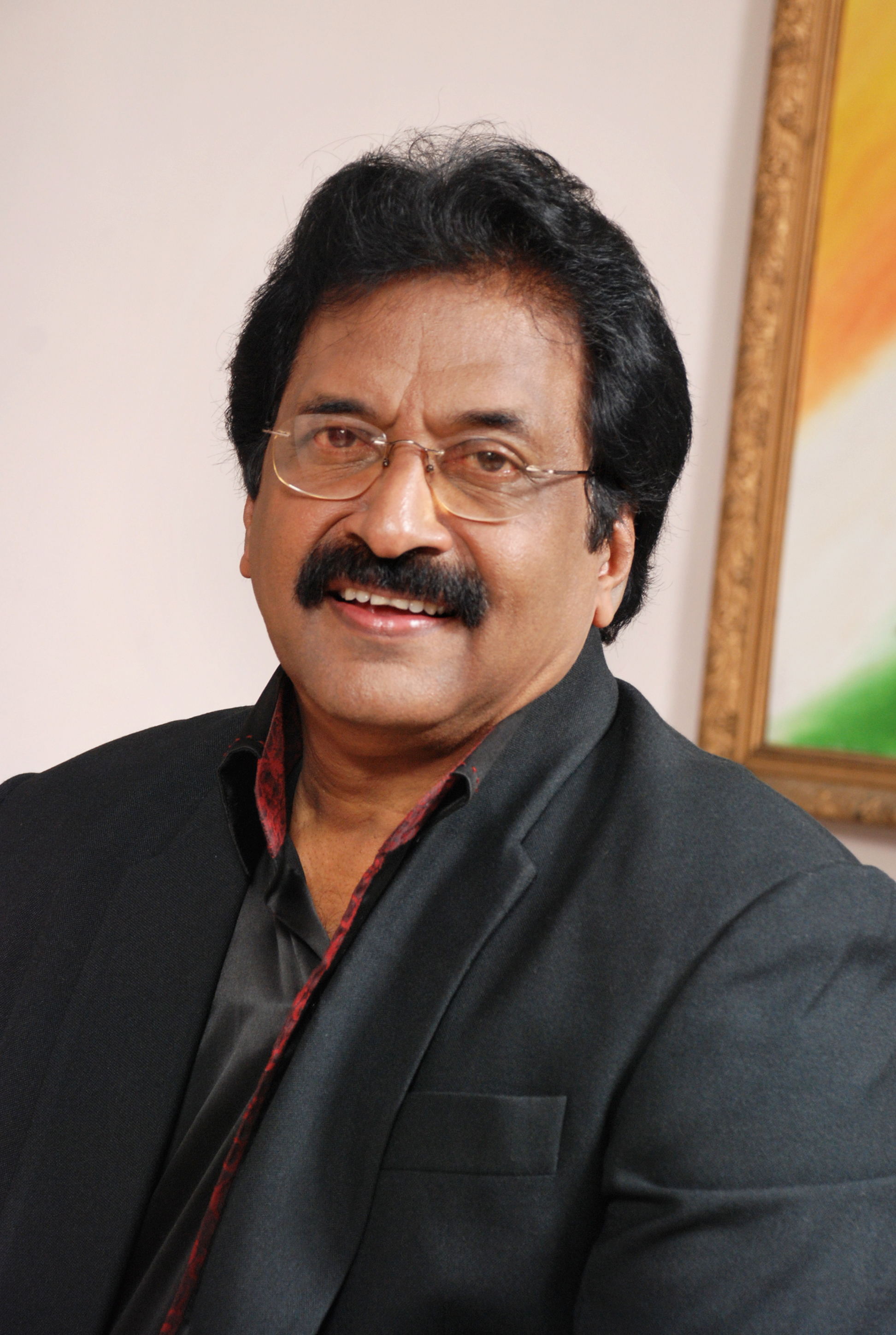
- Jolly Abraham in 2009

Background information
- Born: Kochi, Kerala, India
- Genres: Playback singing, Carnatic music
- Occupations: Singer, actor
- Instrument: Vocals
- Years active: 1973–1996
- Label: Audiotracs
- Website: http://jolleeabraham.com/

Jolly Abraham, also known as Jollee Abraham, is an Indian gospel singer and film singer in Malayalam cinema.

== Career and Personal Life ==
Abraham sang more than 100 Malayalam movie songs during the 1970s and 1980s. His debut song was for Chattambikalyani in 1973. He was born in Kumbalam, Eranakulam, and is a graduate in BSc Botany from Sacred Heart College Thevara, Kochi. He has also sung a few Tamil, Telugu and Kannada movie songs. Married with two children, he lives in Chennai.

== Partial filmography ==
=== As an actor ===
- Aakramanam (1981)
- Kilinjalgal (1981) (Tamil movie)
- Aattuvanchi Ulanjappol (1984)

=== As a singer ===
- Kaattinkaravaal ... 'Kunjikkaikal (1974)
- Ushassinte Radhathil ... Kunjikkaikal (1974)
- Pandoru Mukkuvan ... Kunjikkaikal (1974)
- Jayikkaanaay Janichavan ... Chattambikkalyaani (1975)
- Bhagavadgeethayum Sathyageetham ... Omanakkunju (1975)
- Rajanigandhi ... Panchami (1976)
- Maanam Potti Veenu ... Paarijaatham (1976)
- Govinda naama Sankeerthanam ... Thuruppugulan
- Sahyaachalathile ... Penpuli (1977)
- Maamalayile Poomaram ... Aparaadhi (1977)
- Kaapaalikare ... Rathimanmadhan (1977)
- Eenam Paadithalarnnallo ... Sneham (1977)
- Enikkippol Paadanam ... Madhuraswapnam (1977)
- Pidichaal Pulinkombil ... Madhuraswapnam (1977)
- Ankavaalillatha ... Pattalaam Jaanaki (1977)
- Ambalappuzha Paalppaayasam ... Parivarthanam (1977)
- Swapna Bhoovil Vellikkudakkeezhe ... "Daaliya Pookkal" (1980)
- Singing Christian songs from 1995
- Adada Angu from the Tamil movie ... Mayabazaar 1995 (1995)
- Oru Chinna manikkuyilu from the Tamil movie ... Katta Panchayathu (1996)
- Nadigai Paarkum Naatagam from the Tamil movie ... Oru Nadigai Natakam Parkiral (1978)
- Onnonnanam Kunnathu from the Malayalam Movie ... Chanchattam (1991)
- Manjhinte from the Malayalam movie ... Nirvrithi (2003)
- Varika nee vasanthame from the Malayalam movie ... Pambaram (1979)
- Annushasukal from the Malayalam movie ... Aadipaapam (1989)
- Doore Neelavaanam from the Malayalam movie ... Oormakale Vida Tharu (1980)
- Indulekha Maranju from the Malayalam movie ... Avivahitharude Swargam (1979)
- Annushasukal from the Malayalam movie ... Aadipaapam (1979)
- Nazhikakal Than from the Malayalam movie ... Seetha
- Varika nee vasanthame from the Malayalam movie ... Pambaram
- Shantha Rathri Thiru rathri from the Malayalam movie ... Thuramukham (1979)
- Viswamohini from the Malayalam movie ... Madhurikkunna Raathri (1978)
- Anthikkadappurathoru from the Malayalam movie ... Chamayam
- Dheemtha Thakka from the Malayalam movie ... Guruvayur Kesavan
- AMBALAPPUZHA PAALPPAAYASAM from the Malayalam movie ... Parivarthanam (1977)
- Maanishaada from the Malayalam movie ... Arangum Aniyarayum (1980)
- Yaa Habbi from the Malayalam movie ... Manithali (1984)
- Innathe Pulariyil from the Malayalam movie ... Agni Vyooham (1979)
- Kwaja Sheikhin Maqbaraa from the Malayalam movie ... Maniyara (1983)
- Allah Allah from the Malayalam movie ... Indradhanussu (1979)
- Innuma polladha vetkam from the Tamil movie ... Thiruppangal (1981)
- Mangai Endral Vanam Kooda Irangum from the Tamil movie ... Iraivan Kodutha Varam (1978)
- Vala kilukkam Kelkkanallo from the Malayalam movie ... Sphodanam (1981)
- Ponnurukki Poomalayil from the Malayalam movie ... Penn Simham (1986)
- Aakaasha Swapnamo from the Malayalam movie ... Penn Simham (1986)
- Bhagavadhgeethayum from the Malayalam ... Omanakkunju (1975)
- Aalinganathin from the Malayalam movie ... Iniyathra (1979)
- Kaliyugamoru from the Malayalam movie ... Sathrusamhaaram (1978)
- Makarasankramaraathriyil from the Malayalam movie ... Kaumarapraayam (1979)
- Kaaveri Nadikkarayil Valarnna Kanyakayo from the Malayalam movie ... Kaumarapraayam (1979)
- Makarasankramaraathriyil from the Malayalam movie ... Kaumarapraayam (1979)
- Aalolalochanakal from the Malayalam movie ... Vellayani Paramu (1979)
- Reena Meena - Manmathan Ratchikanum from the Tamil movie ... Oru Thalai Ragam (1980)
- Enne Njan marannu from the Malayalam movie ... Naayattu (1980)
- Gomedakam from the Malayalam movie ... Himam (1983)
- Vilambuvaan Thulumbumee from the Malayalam movie ... Himam (1983)
- Ezhu Swarangal from the Malayalam movie ... Samudram (1977)
- Sahyaachalathile from the Malayalam movie ... Penpuli (1977)
- Malai Raani Mundhaanai from the Tamil movie ...Ore Vaanam Ore Bhoomi (1979)
- Gangai karaiyil from the Tamil movie ... Geetha Oru Shenbagapoo (1980)
- Oduvathu Azhagu Ratham Theduvathu Puthiya Mugam from the Tamil movie ... Deiveega Raagangal (1980)
- Thangaali Bees from the Kannada movie ...onde raktha (1984)
- Odum Thira Onnam Thira from the Malayalam movie ...Aakkramanam (1981)
- Manmadan from the Tamil movie ... Oru Thalai Ragam (1980)
- Adiyenai paaramma pidivaatham yenamma vanakkathirkuria kaathaliye from Tamil movie Vanakkathirkuria Kaathaliye
- Oru Chinna Manikkuyilu Sindhu Padikkuthadi from Tamil movie Katta Panchaayathu
