= MGR Nambi =

Film director

- Born: Kovilpatti
- Other names: Nambirajan; R. Renjith Kumar (former)
- Education: MAA MPhill
- Occupations: Director; Actor; Politician
- Years active: 1981 - current
- Children: 2

Nambirajan is an Indian film director who has worked on Tamil films. He made his directorial debut in the 1980s, before proceeding to make Nila (1994) and Chandralekha (1995).

== Career ==
Being an admirer of M. G. Ramachandran, Nambi worked as a volunteer for his political party and due to his interest towards films, he took the blessings of him and joined the film institute to learn acting and direction. Initially under the name Ranjith Kumar, Nambirajan made several low-budget films in the 1980s. Udhayamagirathu (1981), Manjal Nila (1982), Kunguma Pottu (1982), Anbe Odi Vaa (1984) and Ungalil Oruvan (1985) were made in quick succession. He changed his name to and Nambirajan made Nila (1994) featuring Jayaram in the lead role, before working with Vijay in Chandralekha (1995). A further film with Ajith Kumar during the period titled Muthu Pechi, failed to materialise. In the late 1990s, he launched two films where he was set to be director and actor, Getti Maellam alongside Khushbu and then Rukkumani opposite Sri Kanya. Neither film was released, despite the former having an audio launch.

In 2009, NJ revealed that he had changed his name to MGR Nambi and was worked on producing and directing a new project titled Poruthiru for his new production house, MGR Studios. The name change was reportedly as a result of his close ties with actor M. G. Ramachandran, who had advised Nambirajan to join the Adyar Film Institute as a teenager. He also started his own recording studio in Saligramam for films to complete post-production work. The shoot for Poruthiru developed through 2010 with newcomers in the lead role, but the film failed to get a theatrical release. Similarly another film titled Sudalai Mannan, a tale on a revolutionary who fought against the British empire, failed to materialise. He then launched an audacious project titled Kaala Bhairavi, a multilingual film reportedly with a budget of 100 crores, which was to feature foreign actors Robert Johnson and Alicia, along with Bharath Reddy. The film failed to develop post a grand launch event.

== Filmography ==
Year	Film	Notes
1981	Udhayamagirathu	
1982	Manjal Nila	
1983	Kunguma Pottu	
1984	Anbe Odi Vaa	
1985	Ungalil Oruvan	
1986	Kungamapottu	
1994	Nila	
1995	Chandralekha	
1997	Maa Ayana Bangaram	Telugu film

=== As actor ===
- En Rasavin Manasile (1991)
- Kizhakke Varum Paattu (1993)
- Konjam Kadhal Konjam Modhal (2025)
