= Oru Kochu Swapnam =

- Directed by: Vipin Das
- Written by: Joseph Madappally
- Produced by: A. M. Shareef
- Starring: Mohanlal; Ilavarasi; Nedumudi Venu; Seema; Unnimary
- Cinematography: Vipin Das
- Edited by: Ravi
- Music by: M. B. Sreenivasan
- Production company: Ramees Movies
- Distributed by: Dinny Films
- Release date: 2 March 1984
- Country: India
- Language: Malayalam

Oru Kochu Swapnam (transl. One small dream) is a 1984 Indian Malayalam-language family drama film directed and shot by Vipin Das and written by Joseph Madappally. The film stars Mohanlal, Ilavarasi, Nedumudi Venu, Seema, and Unnimary. The film score was composed by M. B. Sreenivasan. The story is about a teenage girl lacking proper sex education exploring her sexuality.

== Plot ==
Sulu and her younger sister Sindhu have no family and lives alone by their own. Sulu is a co-operative bank employee and Sindhu is a school-going teenager. Sulu is in a secret romantic relationship with her co-worker in the bank, Venu. Sulu is several years elder than Sindhu, so she treats her as a child as if they were mother and daughter. Sulu is concerned about Sindhu's growth, she advises her to limit her physical interaction with boys, Sindhu becomes ambivalent. As their life goes on, Sindhu reaches menarche, despite knowing that she has reached puberty, other than being overprotective, Sulu is too embarrassed to give her proper sex education.

One day, Sindhu finds out about the relationship between Sulu and Venu by chance. Sulu is embarrassed. Sulu and Venu decide to make their relationship public, they marries at a short ceremony and moves to Venu's house, taking along Sindhu with them. Sindhu has good results in her higher secondary exams and has now admitted to a college. Sindhu's neighbour Jaya also studies in their college and she has had multiple romantic relationship with boys. Jaya teaches her more about romantic relationships with opposite-sex, at one time, she also hands her over an adult pornographic magazine.

Sulu reduces her over-caring for Sindhu and spares more time for spending time with Venu. Sindhu begins to feel it, one day, they have an open confrontation regarding that, while having dinner, Sulu scolds her for depending on her for serving her food. Sindhu gradually cope up with the new situation. Meanwhile, she becomes increasingly curious about male-female intimacy of her age groups as well as sexual relationship of her sister and brother-in-law. Sulu and Venu have caught her at multiple occasions for eavesdropping and voyeurism when they were having their husband and wife moments. Finally, they decides to move her to a hostel near her college.

== Cast ==
- Mohanlal as Gilbert, a video shop owner
- Ilavarasi as Sindhu, Sulu's sister
- Nedumudi Venu as Venugopal / Venu, co-operative bank employee
- Seema as Sulu, Co-operative bank employee
- Unnimary as Sophia, Sindhu's roommate
- Ravi Menon as Damu, hostel gate keeper
- Lalithasree as Sreedevi, house maid
- Achankunju as Rickshawaala
- Kottayam Santha as Hostel matron
- Janardhanan as Co-operative bank manager
- Sabitha Anand as Maggie, video shop staff (bit part)

== Soundtrack ==
The music was composed by M. B. Sreenivasan with lyrics by O. N. V. Kurup.

No.	Song	Singers	Lyrics	Length (m:ss)
1	"Maaril Chaarthiya"	K. J. Yesudas	O. N. V. Kurup	04:16
2	"Udyaanadevi Than"	K. J. Yesudas	O. N. V. Kurup	05:03
