= Manjal Nila =

- Theatrical release poster
- Directed by: R. Renjith Kumar
- Screenplay by: R. Renjith Kumar
- Produced by: Kallakudi Manikkam; Chandran
- Starring: Suresh; Thyagu; Kalaranjini
- Edited by: R. Surendranath
- Music by: Ilaiyaraaja
- Production company: Sri Manickam Films
- Release date: 23 July 1982
- Country: India
- Language: Tamil

Manjal Nila (credited as Manghal Nila; transl. Yellow Moon) is a 1982 Indian Tamil-language romantic drama film directed by R. Renjith Kumar. It stars Suresh and Kalaranjini. The film was released on 23 July 1982.

== Plot ==
Anand and Vasantha are new students at a film institute and quickly form a deep connection with each other. Many of the other students and even a few lecturers have an eye for Vasantha and intervene in their budding relationship. Vasantha herself is reluctant to pursue their love beyond friendship as she has a complicated past. Gopi, the editing professor, uses his power to take advantage of female students at the institute. He attempts the same with Vasantha, but is caught and eventually fired by the principal. He nurses a grudge and informs Vasantha's mother about Vasantha's closeness with Anand. Her mother is incensed by her daughter's budding relationship. She is determined to see her daughter become a successful actor and forces Vasantha to avoid Anand. He doesn't understand her sudden distance from him and is heartbroken. Vasantha eventually tells Anand about her past and why her mother is so determined to see her become a star. Anand reaffirms his love for Vasantha and the two decide to be together as they search for acting opportunities. Figures from their past intervene and force the young couple to face more roadblocks in their quest for happiness.

== Cast ==
- Suresh as Anand
- Nizhalgal Ravi as Gopi
- Thyagu as Suresh
- Kalaranjini as Vasantha
- Major Sundarrajan as principal
- Pulavar Murugaiyyan
- Ennathe Kannaiah
- Kumarimuthu
- Thilakam Narayanasami

== Soundtrack ==
Soundtrack was composed by Ilaiyaraaja. The song "Ila Manathil Ezhum Kanavil" is set to the Carnatic raga Mayamalavagowla.

Song title	Singer(s)	Lyricist
"Poonthendral Kaatre Vaa"	P. Susheela, P. Jayachandran	Gangai Amaran
"Busse Busse Coloure"	Deepan Chakravarthy, Saibaba, Sirkazhi G. Sivachidambaram	Gangai Amaran
"Pen Mayile"	S. Janaki	Gangai Amaran
"Ila Manathil Ezhum Kanavil"	K. J. Yesudas, B. S. Sasirekha	Muthulingam
"Kaatre Yazh Meetu"	Ashok	Pulamaipithan

== Critical reception ==
S. Shiva Kumar, writing for Mid-Day, panned the film, particularly for Kumar's direction, writing, and Suresh's performance. Thiraignani of Kalki felt none of the characters stay in mind due to director's mistake and also panned the story and climax as weak and concluded the director seems to have entered the film industry in haste. Balumani of Anna criticised the music but appreciated the dialogues.
