= Bheeman Raghu =

Indian actor

Bheeman Reghu
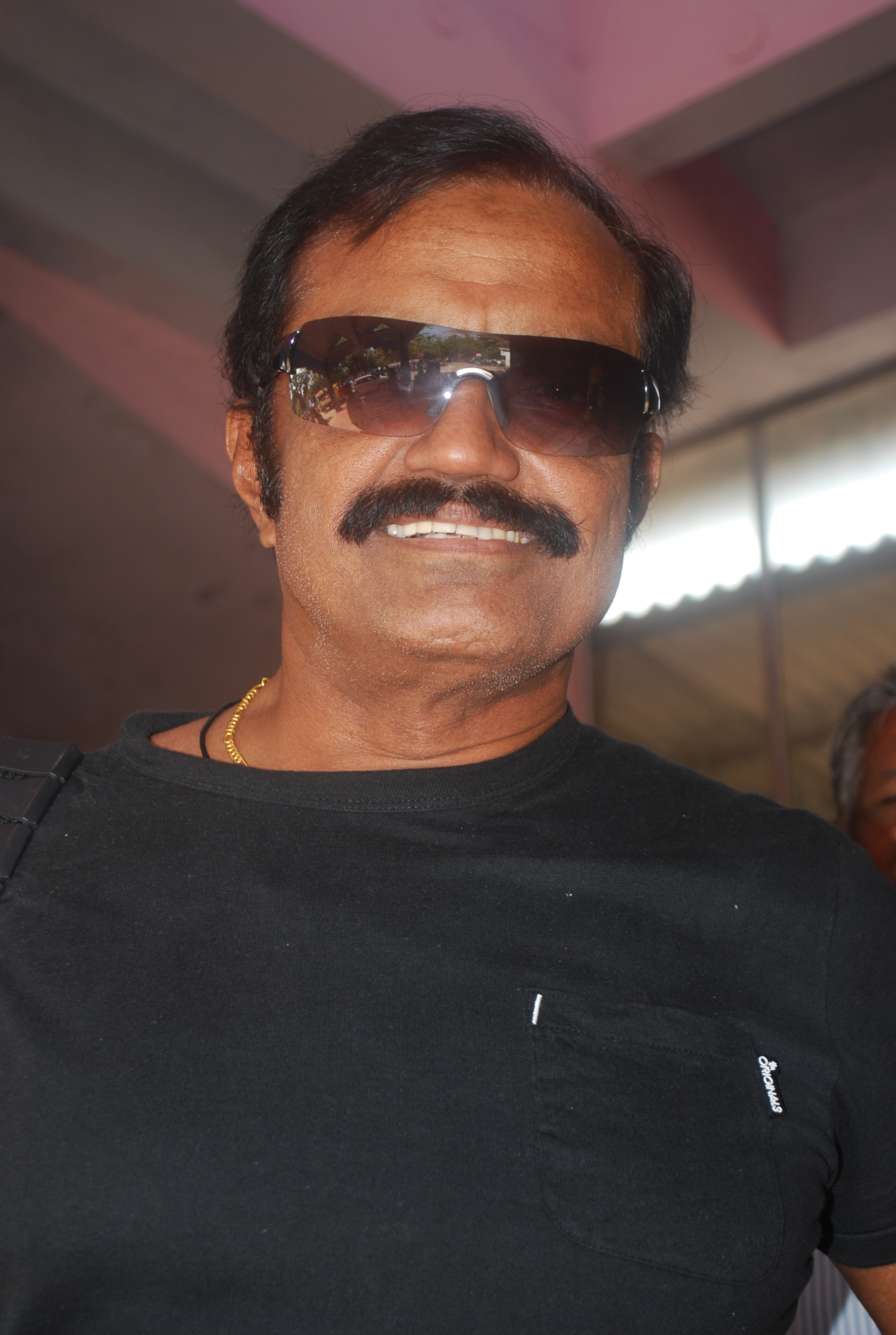
- Reghu at an event in 2013
- Born: Reghu Damodharan; Perunna, Changanacherry, Travancore–Cochin, India
- Other names: Bheeman Raghu, Reghuvera, Nilppan
- Education: University of Kerala (LLB)
- Occupations: Actor; police officer
- Years active: 1981–present
- Political party: Communist Party of India (Marxist) (since 2023)
- Other political affiliations: Indian National Congress (before 2016); Bharatiya Janata Party (2016–2023)
- Spouse: Sudha Reghu (m. 1978)
- Children: 3

Reghu Damodharan, known by his stage name Bheeman Reghu, is an Indian actor, politician and retired police officer. Before transitioning to a full-time career in cinema, he served as a sub-inspector in the Kerala Police. With a career spanning over four decades, Reghu has appeared in more than 400 films, predominantly in Malayalam cinema. While he is best recognized for his villainous roles, he has occasionally ventured into comedic performances.

Beyond acting, he has also been involved in politics and film direction. In 2016, Reghu contested the Kerala Legislative Assembly election as a Bharatiya Janata Party (BJP) candidate from Pathanapuram constituency, finishing in third place. In 2023, Reghu quit the BJP and joined the Communist Party of India (Marxist) (CPIM). He made his directorial debut with Chaana (2023).

== Early life ==
Reghu, originally named Reghu Damodharan, was born in Puzhavathu, Changanassery, in Kottayam district in the former Travancore–Cochin state. He was born to K. P. Damodaran Nair, a former Municipal Commissioner, and Thankamma. He has a sister, Vasundhara Devi.

His early education took place at St. Stephen's School, Pathanapuram. During 1970–71, while studying at Sanatana Dharma College in Alappuzha, he was part of the college weightlifting team. He later attended University College Thiruvananthapuram, where he graduated with a Bachelor of Science (BSc) degree. He subsequently pursued an LLB degree from Government Law College, Thiruvananthapuram.

== Career ==
Reghu served as a sub-inspector in the Kerala Police. He made his acting debut in a leading role in the Malayalam film Bheeman in 1982, portraying a character who resembled the late actor Jayan. Since then, he has been popularly known by the moniker "Bheeman". Over the course of his career, he has acted in more than 400 films. Although he is primarily known for his antagonistic roles, he has also appeared in comedic roles in several films.

In 2023, he made his directorial debut with Chaana, in which he also starred. Written by Aji Aylara, the story centers on a Tamil man from Tenkasi who travels to Kerala in search of a livelihood as a knife sharpener. The film was released theatrically on 17 March 2023.

== Politics ==
Before 2016, Reghu was an active supporter of the Indian National Congress (INC) and campaigned for several Congress candidates in the Kerala Legislative Assembly elections. After joining the Bharatiya Janata Party (BJP) in 2016, he unsuccessfully contested the 2016 Kerala Legislative Assembly election as the BJP candidate of the National Democratic Alliance (NDA) from Pathanapuram constituency. He contested against fellow actors K. B. Ganesh Kumar of the Kerala Congress (B) representing the LDF and Jagadish of the Indian National Congress representing the UDF. He finished third with 11,700 votes.

In 2023, Reghu quit the BJP and joined the Communist Party of India (Marxist).

== Personal life ==
Bheeman Reghu married Sudha Reghu. The couple have three children.

== Filmography ==
=== Film ===
Year	Title	Role	Notes
1981	Grihalakshmi		
1981	Pinneyum Pookkunna Kaadu		
1981	Kaahalam		
1982	Aa Divasam		
1982	Thadakam		
1982	Ithiri Neram Othiri Karyam	Jacob	
1982	Bheeman		First film as hero
1983	Thimingalam		
1983	Hello Madras Girl		
1983	Oru Maadapraavinte Kadha		
1983	Asthram		
1983	Rathilayam		
1983	Kodumkattu		
1983	Asuran		
1983	Ponthooval		
1984	Thirakkil Alppa Samayam	Bhargavan	
1984	Nethavu		
1984	Raajavembaala	Antony	
1984	Nishedi	Vimal/Vinod	
1984	Rakshassu	Raghu	
1984	Bullet		
1984	Bheekaran		
1984	Ivide Ingane	Sugunan	
1984	Itha Innu Muthal	Rajkumar	
1985	Paara		
1985	Kiratham	Radhakrishnan	
1985	Oru Naal Innoru Naal	Koyakutti	
1985	Kannaaram Pothippothi	Vaasu	
1985	Sammelanam		
1985	Mukhyamanthri	Jamal	
1985	Shatru	Johny	
1985	Janakeeya Kodathi	Raveendran	
1986	Sakhavu		
1986	Pidikittapulli		
1986	Niramulla Raavukal		
1986	Ardha Raathri		
1986	Railway Cross		
1986	Karinagam		
1986	Kaala Rathri		
1987	Dheeran		
1987	Neeyallengil Njan	Tiger Ramu	
1987	Itha Samayamayi		
1987	Ithrayum Kaalam		
1988	1921	Historical character	
1988	Janma Shatru	Raghu	
1988	Onninu Purake Mattonnu		
1988	Karate Girls		
1988	Theruvu Narthaki	Muraleedharan	
1988	Bheekaran	Rajan	
1988	Mukthi	Police officer	
1989	Puthiya Karukkal	Robert	
1989	Oru Vadakkan Veeragatha	Aringodar's Sishyan	
1989	Mrigaya	Kunjachan	
1990	Randam Varavu	Vasu	
1990	Arhatha	Siddique	
1990	Midhya	Varghese	
1990	Samrajyam	Alexander's right-hand man	
1990	Kalikkalam	Jose	
1991	Godfather	Premachandran	
1991	Ente Sooryaputhrikku	Ravi	
1991	Advaitham		
1991	Inspector Balram	D'cruz Perera	
1991	Master Plan		
1991	Adayalam	Raju	
1991	Agni Nilavu	Karinjan	
1991	Neelagiri	Chandru	
1992	Neelakurukkan		
1992	Police Diary		
1992	Kizhakkan Pathrose		
1992	Kauravar	Ramayyan	
1992	Mahanagaram	Padmanabhan	
1993	Vietnam Colony	Irumpu John	
1993	Janam	Feroz	
1993	Devasuram	Kallan Chacko	
1994	Gentleman Security	Cruz	
1994	Kadal		
1994	Rudraksham	Thankachan	
1994	Commissioner	Wilfred Vincent Bastin	
1995	Arabikadaloram	Karlose	
1995	Street		
1995	Prayikkara Pappan		
1995	Spadikam	SI Somasekharan Pillai	
1996	Mookkilla Rajyathu Murimookkan Rajavu		
1996	Hitlist	Vikram	
1996	Dominic Presentation	Amareshan	
1997	Kaduva Thoma		
1997	Bhoopathi		
1997	Aaraam Thampuran	Apputty Nambiar	
1997	Varnapakittu	SI Damodaran Nair	
1998	Kalapam	Karippayi Antony	
1998	Magician Mahendralal from Delhi	Kumar	
1999	James Bond	Haajiyar	
1999	Captain	Rengan	
1999	FIR	Chakrapani, As a Drama Director	
1999	Aayiram Meni	Maramadi Mammachan	
2000	Narasimham	C. I. Sankaranarayanan	
2000	Valliettan	Nedungadi	
2000	India Gate		
2000	Priyankari		
2000	Rapid Action Force	Tyson John	
2000	Mark Antony	Kariyachan	
2001	Chitrathoonukal		
2001	Layam		
2001	Nariman	Musthafa Kamal	
2002	Ee Nadu Innale Vare	Ana Kasim	
2002	Suvarna Mohangal		
2002	Phantom	Irachi Pranchi	
2002	Chathurangam	Hakkim	
2004	Thudakkam	A.S.I. Prushothaman	
2004	Vajram	Poovalan	
2005	Chandrolsavam	Eangapara Peethambaran	
2005	Thaskara Veeran	Kargil Narayanan	
2005	Ben Johnson	Bheeman Raghu	
2005	Udayon	Police officer	
2005	Naran	Keeri Raghavan	
2005	Rajamanikyam	Quintal' Varkey	
2006	Madhuchandralekha	Arumugham	
2006	Thuruppu Gulan	Tipper Vasu	
2006	Chacko Randaaman	Chenkannan Rajan	
2006	Prajapathi	SP Ramachandran	
2006	Highway Police		
2006	Red Salute	Marthandan Velayudhan	
2006	Raashtram	Koshi	
2006	Lion	DYSP Anantharaghavan	
2006	Chinthamani Kolacase	David Rajarathnam	
2006	Chess	DYSP Koshi	
2006	The Don	Sikandar	
2006	Kanaka Simhasanam	Ramakrishnan	
2007	Romeoo	Avaran	
2007	Chotta Mumbai	CI Alex	
2007	Black Cat	Vikram Dharma	
2007	Kaakki	DIG	
2007	Athishayan	Commissioner Shanmughan	
2007	Hallo	Batheri Bappu	
2007	Nasrani	Rajeevan	
2008	Jubilee	Aravukaran Ali	
2008	Kabadi Kabadi	Chitrangathan	
2008	Kanal Kannaadi		
2008	Sound of Boot	ADGP Thomas Sebastian	
2009	Seetha Kalyanam	Usilampatti Vasu	
2009	Ee Pattanathil Bhootham	Circus master	
2009	Hailesa	Valayar Maniyappan	
2009	Kappal Muthalaali	Parushuraman	
2009	Loudspeaker	Madhavan Nair	
2009	Duplicate	Blade Dasappan	
2010	Nalla Pattukare	Dance teacher	
2010	Thaskara Lahala	Idiyan George	
2010	Aakaasha Yaathra		
2010	Njaan Sanchaari		
2010	Oru Small Family	Hercules	
2010	Best of Luck	Bhasi	
2010	Kanyakumari Express		
2011	Janapriyan		
2011	Manushya Mrugam		
2011	Teja Bhai & Family	Johny	
2012	Theruvu Nakshatrangal		
2012	Madirasi		
2012	Naughty Professor		
2013	My Fan Ramu		
2013	Housefull	Benchamin Joseph	
2013	For Sale	Pothu Swami	
2014	Vasanthathinte Kanal Vazhikalil		
2014	On The Way		
2014	RajadhiRaja	DySP Paulose Pothen	
2014	Nagara Varidhi Naduvil Njan		
2014	Malayalakkara Residency		
2019	Kodathi Samaksham Balan Vakeel	Irumbu Babu	
2019	Mera Naam Shaji		
2019	Thenkashikattu		
2019	Kuttymama		
2019	Mr. Pavanayi 99.99		
2019	Visudha Pusthakam		
2019	Oru Mass Katha Veendum		
2020	Zebra Varakal		
2021	Pidikittapulli		
2022	P. K. Rosy		
2023	Prema Deshapu Yuvarani		
2023	Orapara Kalyana Vishesham		
2023	Chaana		
2024	Ondu Sarala Prema Kathe		
2024	Bad Boyz		
2026	Law and Order †	TBA	

=== Other language films ===
Year	Film	Role	Language	Notes
1989	Vaathiyaar Veettu Pillai		Tamil	
1990	Idu Saadhya		Kannada	Dubbed in Malayalam as 48 Manikkoor
1991	Karpoora Mullai	Ravi	Tamil	

=== Television ===
Year	Title	Role	Channel
2004 – 2005	Kadamattathu Kathanar	Ittan Pada Nair	Asianet
2005	Vikramadithyan	Needivakyan	Asianet
2016	Ugram Ujjwalam Season 2	Himself	Mazhavil Manorama
2018	Urvashi Theatres	Himself	Asianet
2021	Koodevide	Komban	Asianet
2023	Gouri Shankaram	DYSP Somashekharan	Asianet
