= Bheeman =

1982 Indian film

- Directed by: Hassan
- Written by: Pappanamkodu Lakshmanan
- Screenplay by: Pappanamkodu Lakshmanan
- Produced by: Arifa Hassan
- Starring: Bheeman Raghu; Ratheesh; Kaviyoor Ponnamma; Sathaar; Balan K. Nair
- Cinematography: J. Williams
- Edited by: V. P. Krishnan
- Music by: A. T. Ummer
- Production company: Arifa Enterprises
- Distributed by: Raj Pictures
- Release date: 19 March 1982
- Country: India
- Language: Malayalam

Bheeman is a 1982 Indian Malayalam-language action drama film directed by Hassan and written by Pappanamkodu Lakshmanan. The film stars Bheeman Raghu, Ratheesh, Kaviyoor Ponnamma, Sathaar, Balan K. Nair. The film has musical score by A. T. Ummer.

== Cast ==
- Bheeman Raghu
- Swapna
- Ratheesh
- Kaviyoor Ponnamma
- Sathaar
- Balan K. Nair
- Raveendran
- Captain Raju
- Kuthiravattam Pappu
- Ranipadmini

== Soundtrack ==
The music was composed by A. T. Ummer and the lyrics were written by K. G. Menon and Ramachandran.

No.	Song	Singers	Lyrics	Length (m:ss)
1	"Maanasamaniyara"	S. Janaki	K. G. Menon	
2	"Muthurasool"	K. J. Yesudas	Ramachandran	
3	"Pennaale"	K. P. Brahmanandan, Chorus, Kalyani Menon	Ramachandran	
4	"Thenmalartheril"	K. J. Yesudas, Ambili	Ramachandran	
