= Nishedhi =

- Directed by: K. S. Gopalakrishnan
- Starring: Sukumaran; Bheeman Raghu; Seema
- Edited by: A. Sukumaran
- Music by: K. J. Joy
- Production company: Margi Creation
- Distributed by: Margi Creation
- Release date: 25 February 1984
- Country: India
- Language: Malayalam

Nishedhi is a 1984 Indian Malayalam-language film, directed by K. S. Gopalakrishnan. The film stars Sukumaran, Bheeman Raghu and Seema in the lead roles. The film has musical score by K. J. Joy.

== Cast ==
- Sukumaran as Raju
- Bheeman Raghu as Vimal/Vinod
- Seema as Sheeja
- Vincent Karunakara Kurup
- Sudheer as Williams
- Ravi Menon as Ravi
- Santhosh as Sunny
- Khadeeja as Mariyamma
- Anuradha
- M. G. Soman as Rajasekharan
- Ranipadmini as Ajitha
- Kalaranjini as Anitha
- K. P. Ummer as Madhavan Thampi
- Poojappura Ravi as Narayana Pilla
- Santhakumari
- Mafia Sasi

== Soundtrack ==
The music was composed by K. J. Joy and the lyrics were written by Bharanikkavu Sivakumar.

No.	Song	Singers	Length (m:ss)
1	"Daahaardrayaanu Njaan"	P. Susheela	
2	"Manassil Mizhikal"	K. J. Yesudas	
3	"Swapnangal Inacherum"	Vani Jairam, Krishnachandran	
