= Kaala Rathri =

- Directed by: K. S. Gopalakrishnan
- Produced by: Diana (George Abraham)
- Starring: Jagathy Sreekumar; Sathaar; Anuradha; Bheeman Raghu
- Edited by: A. Sukumaran
- Music by: A. T. Ummer
- Production company: Diana International
- Distributed by: Diana International
- Release date: 9 April 1987
- Country: India
- Language: Malayalam

Kaala Rathri is a 1987 Indian Malayalam film, directed by K. S. Gopalakrishnan and produced by Diana. The film stars Jagathy Sreekumar, Sathaar, Anuradha and Bheeman Raghu in the lead roles. The film has musical score by A. T. Ummer.

== Cast ==
- Jagathy Sreekumar
- Sathaar
- Anuradha
- Bheeman Raghu
- Janardanan

== Soundtrack ==
The music was composed by A. T. Ummer and the lyrics were written by Poovachal Khader.

No.	Song	Singers	Lyrics	Length (m:ss)
1	"Kandu Penne"	K. S. Chithra	Poovachal Khader	
2	"Poomazhayil Poomalayil"	Ambilikkuttan	Poovachal Khader	
3	"Yudhathil Thotta Raani"	K. S. Chithra	Poovachal Khader	
