= Anbe Odi Vaa =

- Directed by: R. Renjith Kumar
- Screenplay by: R. Renjith Kumar
- Story by: Sivachandran
- Produced by: R. Renjith Kumar
- Starring: Mohan; Urvashi
- Cinematography: R. Renjith Kumar
- Edited by: A. Selvanathan
- Music by: Ilaiyaraaja
- Production company: KR Art Pictures
- Release date: 12 May 1984
- Country: India
- Language: Tamil

Anbe Odi Vaa (transl. Dear, come running) is a 1984 Indian Tamil-language film written, produced, directed and photographed by R. Renjith Kumar. The film stars Mohan and Urvashi. It was released on 12 May 1984.

== Plot ==
Prema transfers to a college in the same town as college student Mahesh. She is rich and harbours a deep sense of entitlement. Mahesh is reserved and primarily focused on his education as well as excelling in running track. He politely ignores Prema the few times they meet which enrages her. She makes it a point to reach out to him and fosters a friendship. Mahesh soon falls in love with Prema and she becomes the focus of life. Prema plays along in an attempt to get revenge. She finally comes clean when Mahesh risks his life to save her. Prema apologises and states that while she respects him, she doesn't love him. She's set to marry another man and walks out of his life. Years later, Mahesh is a professor in Bombay and befriends one of his students, Priya (Indira). In a visit to her house, he realises Priya's older sister is Prema. After leaving him, Prema gets in an accident and is disfigured which stops her marriage. Embarrassed by her looks, she's been a recluse and has had a lot of time to think about her actions. When the two meet again, Prema realises that she does love Mahesh but is reluctant to tell him given their history. Mahesh is still in love with Prema and writes her a letter expressing his desire for them to unite. Unfortunately, Priya gets the letter and assumes that Mahesh loves her. Prema learns the truth and finds herself in a bind as she doesn't want to hurt her sister or Mahesh. The three must find themselves out of this odd triangle.

== Cast ==
- Mohan as Mahesh
- Urvashi as Prema
- Indira as Priya
- Major Sundarrajan as Prema's uncle
- P. R. Varalakshmi as Mahesh's sister
- Bindu Ghosh as Vanji
- Junior Balaiah as Ilavarasu
- Loose Mohan as Bus conductor
- Vennira Aadai Moorthy as Bus Driver
- Manorama as Bus Conductor
- Typist Gopu as Professor

== Production ==
The film was launched on 23 February 1983 at Prasad Studios. The film's story was written by actor Sivachandran.

== Soundtrack ==
The soundtrack is composed by Ilaiyaraaja. For the dubbed Telugu version Love Story, all songs were written by Rajasri.

Tamil
No.	Title	Lyrics	Singer(s)	Length
1.	"Jodi Nadhigal"	Vaali	S. P. Balasubrahmanyam	4:27
2.	"Azhagaana Pookal"	Vaali	S. P. Balasubrahmanyam	4:09
3.	"Idhalil Amudham"	Vaali	K. J. Yesudas, Vani Jairam	4:33
4.	"Kanavodu Engum"	Vaali	S. Janaki	4:18
5.	"Kaadhil Kaetathu Oru"	Vairamuthu	Malaysia Vasudevan, Uma Ramanan	4:31
6.	"Thullum Ilamai"	Vairamuthu	S. P. Balasubrahmanyam	4:15
Total length:				26:13

Telugu
No.	Title	Singer(s)	Length
1.	"Andhala Pule"	S. P. Balasubrahmanyam	4:30
2.	"Palike Adharam"	M. Ramesh, S. P. Sailaja	4:23
3.	"Kurra Vayasu"	S. P. Balasubrahmanyam	4:10
4.	"Oohalanni"	S. P. Balasubrahmanyam	4:15
Total length:			17:18

== Reception ==
Jayamanmadhan of Kalki criticised Renjith Kumar's direction, but praised his cinematography.
