= Koumara Swapnangal =

- Directed by: K. S. Gopalakrishnan
- Written by: D. Sajith; Sarath Chandran (dialogues)
- Screenplay by: Sarath Chandran
- Starring: Pattom Sadan; Prameela; Santhosh; Chandrasekharan
- Cinematography: Kishor Kumar
- Edited by: C. Mani
- Production company: Sruthilaya Films
- Distributed by: Sruthilaya Films
- Release date: 1991
- Country: India
- Language: Malayalam

Koumara Swapnangal is a 1991 Indian Malayalam film, directed by K. S. Gopalakrishnan. The film stars Pattom Sadan, Prameela, Santhosh and Chandrasekharan in the lead roles.

== Cast ==
- Pattom Sadan
- Prameela
- Santhosh
- Chandrasekharan
- Mukundan
- Kalaranjini
- Prathapachandran
- Bahadoor
- Jayarekha
- Karikkakam Mani
- Kuyili
- Lalithasree
- M. G. Soman
- Naveena
- Priya (New)
- Ragini (New)
- Ramu
- Ravi Menon
- Sajith
- Valsala Menon
- Vincent
- Master Ajith
