= Sangham (1988 film) =

1988 film directed by Joshiy

- Poster
- Directed by: Joshiy
- Written by: Dennis Joseph
- Produced by: K. Rajagopal
- Starring: Mammootty; Thilakan; Parvathy Jayaram; Saritha
- Cinematography: Jayanan Vincent
- Edited by: K. Sankunni
- Music by: Shyam
- Production company: KRG Movie International
- Release date: 17 May 1988
- Country: India
- Language: Malayalam

Sangham (Gang) is a 1988 Indian Malayalam-language film, directed by Joshiy and produced by K. Rajagopal. The film stars Mammootty, Thilakan, Parvathy and Saritha in the lead roles. The film has musical score by Shyam.

== Plot ==
The film is about a spoiled brat Kuttappai and his young friends. Kuttappai is the son of Rappai, a rich miser. Kuttappai make all sorts of trouble in his village. One related to a snake boat race made him and his friends get exiled to a neighboring state. Unknown to Kuttappai, he has an illegitimate daughter. She is taken care by his father through a servant. The servant takes money and land and promises Rappai to take care of Kuttappai's daughter. The servant uses the money and land for his own growth and pushes Kuttappai's wife into prostitution. When matters get hairy, the servant tries to sell Kuttappai's daughter to prostitution as well. When Kuttappai learns of the situation, he is able to save his daughter, but loses her mother in the process.

== Cast ==
- Mammootty as Illikkal Kuttappai
- Thilakan as Illikkal Rappai
- Parvathy Jayaram as Aswathy
- Saritha as Ammini
- Seema as Mollykutty
- Mukesh as Raju
- Jagadish as Palunni
- K. B. Ganesh Kumar as Anil
- Appa Haja as Alex
- Innocent
- Prathapachandran as Panicker
- Balan K. Nair as Mathai
- Jagannatha Varma
- K. P. A. C. Azeez
- V. K. Sreeraman as Roy
- Vinu Chakravarthy as Kuppusamy Thevar
- Ashokan as Balan
- Kunchan as Muthu
- P. C. George as Prayakara Appa
- James as Pappi

== Release ==
The film was released on 18 May 1988.

== Box office ==
The fim was commercial success.

== Soundtrack ==
The music was composed by Shyam and the lyrics were written by Shibu Chakravarthy.

No.	Song	Singers	Lyrics	Length (m:ss)
1	"Innalle Punchavayal"	P. Jayachandran, Chorus	Shibu Chakravarthy	
2	"Nirasandhya"	K. S. Chithra	Shibu Chakravarthy	
