= Iniyaval Urangatte =

- Directed by: K. G. George
- Written by: K. G. George (dialogues)
- Screenplay by: K. G. George
- Produced by: Gopi Menon
- Starring: Sukumaran; Anuradha
- Cinematography: B. Kannan
- Edited by: G. Venkitaraman
- Music by: M. K. Arjunan
- Production company: Angel Films
- Distributed by: Angel Films
- Release date: 17 November 1978
- Country: India
- Language: Malayalam

Iniyaval Urangatte is a 1978 Indian Malayalam film, directed by K. G. George. The film stars Sukumaran and Anuradha in the lead role. The film has musical score by M. K. Arjunan.

== Cast ==
- Sukumaran
- Anuradha

== Soundtrack ==
The music was composed by M. K. Arjunan and the lyrics were written by Poovachal Khader.

No.	Song	Singers	Lyrics	Length (m:ss)
1	"Mayakkathin Chirakukal"	Ambili	Poovachal Khader	
2	"Prethabhoomiyil Naavukal"	Selma George	Poovachal Khader	
3	"Rakthasindooram Chaarthiya"	K. J. Yesudas	Poovachal Khader	
