= Omanikkan Ormavaikkan =

- Directed by: A. B. Raj
- Written by: Prabhakar Puthur; John Paul (dialogues)
- Screenplay by: John Paul
- Starring: Mohanlal; Santhosh; Maniyanpilla Raju; Menaka
- Music by: Raveendran
- Production company: Kalaranjini Films
- Distributed by: Kalaranjini Films
- Release date: 9 February 1985
- Country: India
- Language: Malayalam

Omanikkan Ormavaikkan is a 1985 Indian Malayalam-language film, directed by A. B. Raj. The film stars Mohanlal, Santhosh, Maniyanpilla Raju and Menaka in the lead roles. The film has songs composed by Raveendran.

== Cast ==
- Mohanlal
- Santhosh
- Maniyanpilla Raju
- Menaka
- Baby Shalini

== Soundtrack ==
The music was composed by Raveendran with lyrics by Poovachal Khader.

No.	Song	Singers	Lyrics	Length (m:ss)
1	"Achanum Ammakkum"	Vani Jairam	Poovachal Khader	
2	"Kuttaalam Kuttaalam"	K. J. Yesudas	Poovachal Khader	
3	"Pudava Njoriyum"	K. J. Yesudas, Lathika	Poovachal Khader	
4	"Seethappakshikku Seemantham"	Sujatha Mohan	Poovachal Khader	
