= Kaumarapraayam =

- Directed by: K. S. Gopalakrishnan
- Written by: Cheri Viswanath
- Screenplay by: Cheri Viswanath
- Starring: Krishnachandran; Anuradha; Sukumari; Adoor Bhasi
- Cinematography: V. Karunakaran
- Edited by: K. Sankunni
- Music by: Shyam
- Release date: 30 March 1979
- Country: India
- Language: Malayalam

Kaumarapraayam is a 1979 Indian Malayalam film directed by K. S. Gopalakrishnan and starring Krishnachandran, Anuradha, Sukumari and Adoor Bhasi. The film has musical score by Shyam.

== Cast ==
- Krishnachandran
- Anuradha
- Sukumari
- Adoor Bhasi
- Sathaar
- Kuthiravattam Pappu
- Ravikumar

== Soundtrack ==
The music was composed by Shyam and the lyrics were written by Chunakkara Ramankutty.

No.	Song	Singers	Lyrics	Length (m:ss)
1	"Ee Raavil Njan"	S. Janaki	Chunakkara Ramankutty	
2	"Kaaveri Nadikkarayil Valarnna Kanyakayo"	Jolly Abraham	Chunakkara Ramankutty	
3	"Makarasankramaraathriyil"	Vani Jairam, Jolly Abraham	Chunakkara Ramankutty	
4	"Swargavaathil Thurannu"	P. Jayachandran	Chunakkara Ramankutty	
