= Prema Deshapu Yuvarani =

- Directed by: Sai Sunil Nimmala
- Written by: Sai Sunil Nimmala
- Produced by: Anand Vemuri; Hari Prasad CH
- Starring: Yamin Raaz; Priyanka Rewri
- Cinematography: Devarakonda Shivakumar
- Edited by: MR Varma
- Music by: Ajay Patnaik
- Production companies: A.G.E Creations; S2H2 Entertainments
- Release date: 2 September 2023
- Running time: 148 minutes
- Country: India
- Language: Telugu

Prema Deshapu Yuvarani is a 2023 Indian Telugu-language romantic drama film directed by Sai Sunil Nimmala and starring Yamin Raaz and Priyanka Rewri. The film was released on 2 September 2023 coinciding with Pawan Kalyan's birthday.

== Plot ==
Cherry, a lazy and irresponsible village boy, is arranged to marry a prostitute. During this plan, Cherry meets Sravani, a mature and responsible girl who is a daughter of Cherry's father's friend. Sravani completes her education and prepares for civils and groups in the village. Cherry's father is concerned about his education and requests Sravani to guide him in completing backlog subjects. Sravani falls for Cherry's innocence but hides her love. Meanwhile, a series of murders by local don Veerayya's followers leads to Cherry questioning Sravani's irresponsibility for his marriage proposal. Sravani emotionally explains her reasons, leading to a flashback.

== Cast ==
- Yamin Raaz as Cherry
- Priyanka Rewri as Shravani
- Viraat Karthik
- Mahboob Basha
- Yogi Khatri
- Hari Krishna
- Sunitha Manohar
- Bheeman Raghu

== Soundtrack ==
The music was composed by Ajay Patnaik. The song "Maskathadi" was released in an open bar in Hyderabad.

Track listing
No.	Title	Lyrics	Singer(s)	Length
1.	"Bangaram"	Sai Suneel Nimmala	Sudheer Garapati	4:19
2.	"Maskathadi"	Kasarla Shyam	Geetha Madhuri	3:46
3.	"Tholi Muddu"	Kasarla Shyam	P. V. L. N. Murthy, Sishira Narayan	4:13
Total length:				12:18

== Reception ==
A critic from The Hans India wrote that "On a whole, Prema Desapu Yuvarani is a movie that deserves your attention for its intriguing love story and engaging performances. It offers a blend of emotions, drama, and suspense, making it a worthwhile watch for fans of romance and thriller genres". A critic from NTV rated the film 2 1/2 out of 5.
