= Swarna Gopuram =

- Directed by: A. B. Ayyappan Nair
- Produced by: S. Parameswaran
- Starring: Sukumari; Ratheesh; V. D. Rajappan; Ajayan
- Cinematography: N. Karthikeyan
- Edited by: K. Kannan
- Music by: Johnson; Lyrics: Bichu Thirumala
- Production company: Sumesh Films
- Distributed by: Sumesh Films
- Release date: 30 March 1984
- Country: India
- Language: Malayalam

Swarna Gopuram is a 1984 Indian Malayalam film, directed by A. B. Ayyappan Nair and produced by S. Parameswaran. The film stars Sukumari, Ratheesh, V. D. Rajappan and Ajayan in the lead roles. The film has musical score by Johnson.

== Cast ==
- Sukumari as Johnny's mother
- Ratheesh as Dr. Johny
- V. D. Rajappan as Mathappan
- Ajayan as Sreekanth
- Abhin as Siddarthan
- Jyothi as Mercy
- P. K. Abraham as Siddharthan's father
- Suchitra (old) as Mariya
- Vandana as Renu
- Jagannatha Varma as Alex, Mercy's father
- Anandavally as Mary, Mercy's stepmother
- Anuradha as Dancer

== Soundtrack ==
The music was composed by Johnson and the lyrics were written by Dr K. Narayanankutty, S. L. Puram Anandakrishnan, Bichu Thirumala and Bharanikkavu Sivakumar.

No.	Song	Singers	Lyrics	Length (m:ss)
1	"Abhayamekuka"	Chorus, Lathika	Dr K. Narayanankutty	
2	"Abhinayajeevitha"	K. J. Yesudas	S. L. Puram Anandakrishnan	
3	"Swarangale"	P. Susheela	Bichu Thirumala	
4	"Thaamaranenjam"	Vani Jairam, Balagopalan Thampi	Bharanikkavu Sivakumar	
