= Charavalayam =

- Directed by: K. S. Gopalakrishnan
- Written by: K. S. Gopalakrishnan; K. Basanth (dialogues)
- Screenplay by: K. S. Gopalakrishnan
- Produced by: K. S. Gopalakrishnan
- Starring: Lalu Alex; Captain Raju; Innocent; Hari; Santhosh; Baiju
- Cinematography: K. B. Dayalan
- Edited by: C. Mani
- Music by: S. P. Venkatesh
- Production company: GG Films
- Distributed by: GG Films
- Release date: 5 April 1988
- Country: India
- Language: Malayalam

Charavalayam is a 1988 Indian Malayalam film, directed and produced by K. S. Gopalakrishnan. The film stars Innocent, Hari, Santhosh and Baiju in the lead roles. The film has musical score by S. P. Venkatesh.

== Cast ==
- Lalu Alex as Jagadhessh
- Poojappura Ravi as Kuttan Pilla
- Priya as Karumbi
- Santhakumari as Asha Ousepechan
- Vincent as Chalayil Ousapechan
- Captain Raju as Basheer
- Innocent as Kumaran
- Hari
- Santhosh as Karumban
- Baiju
- Viji

== Soundtrack ==
The music was composed by S. P. Venkatesh and the lyrics were written by Poovachal Khader.

| No. | Song | Singers | Lyrics | Length (m:ss) |
|---|---|---|---|---|
| 1 | "Chandanakkaattil" | Unni Menon | Poovachal Khader | |
| 2 | "Poonthen" | K. S. Chithra | Poovachal Khader | |
