= Naagam (1991 film) =

Naagam is a Malayalam drama movie directed by K.S. Gopalakrishnan and released under the banner of Dushyantha Movies in 1991. The movie starred Ashwini Kumar and Geetanjali in lead roles.
