= Anuradha (actress) =

Indian actress

- Born: Sulochana; Tamil Nadu, India
- Occupations: Actress; Model; Dancer
- Spouse: Sathish Kumar (m. 1987; died 2007)
- Children: 2, including (Abhinayashree
- Parents: Krishna Kumar (father); Saroja Devi (mother)

Anuradha (born Sulochana Devi) is an Indian film and television actress. She was mainly active in the 1980s and 1990s. She was known for her item numbers. She has acted in Tamil, Malayalam, Telugu, Kannada, Hindi and Oriya-language films.

== Career ==
Sulochana was introduced to the film industry by director K. G. George at the age of 13. She started off as a heroine and later moved on to doing item numbers. She was also seen in few Sun TV serials, including Thangam, Kannana kanne, Muthaaramand Deivamagal.

== Personal life ==
Anuradha was born to Krishna Kumar, a choreographer and Saroja Devi, a hairdresser for actresses in films. Her father is Maharashtrian and her mother is from Andhra Pradesh. She was married to Sathish Kumar in 1987, who was a dance director. They had two children Abhinayashree (born 1983) and Kalicharan (born 1991), who have appeared as actors.

However, Kumar met with a motorcycle accident on 7 November 1996, which caused massive damage to his brain and he died in 2007 due to aspiration while ingesting food.

== Partial filmography ==
=== Tamil ===
1. Kalikkoil Kabali (1979)
2. Ponnu Oorukku Pudhusu (1979)
3. Kuzhandhaiyai Thedi (1979)
4. Kaathalikka 90 Naal (1979)
5. Sivappu Malli (1981)
6. Sathya Sundharam (1981)
7. Mohana Punnagai (1981)
8. Naan Kudithukonde Iruppen (1982)
9. Maarupatta Konangal (1982)
10. Azhagiya Laila (1982)
11. Thanga Magan (1983)
12. Ilayapiravigal (1983)
13. Thalaimagan (1983)
14. Oru Odai Nadhiyagirathu (1983)
15. Saatchi (1983)
16. Seerum Singangal (1983)
17. Mella Pesungal (1983)
18. Muthu Engal Sothu (1983)
19. Ilamai Kaalangal (1983)
20. Madurai Sooran (1984)
21. Madras Vathiyar (1984)
22. Priyamudan Prabhu (1984)
23. Theerppu En Kaiyil (1984)
24. Vidhi (1984)
25. Ponmaalai Pozhudhu (1984)
26. 24 Mani Neram (1984)
27. Urimai Thedum Uravu (1984)
28. Aathora Aatha (1984)
29. Vetri (1984)
30. Raja Veettu Kannukkutty (1984)
31. Nooravathu Naal (1984)
32. Marupatta Konangal (1984)
33. Kuzhandhai Yesu (1984)
34. Puyal Kadantha Bhoomi (1984)
35. Thanga Koppai (1984)
36. Sabaash (1984)
37. Niraparaadhi (1984)
38. Ezhuthatha Sattangal (1984)
39. Nandri (1984)
40. Naalai Unathu Naal (1984)
41. Vaai Sollil Veeranadi (1984)
42. Idhu Enga Boomi (1984)
43. Kadamai (1984)
44. Sirai (1984)
45. Nyayam (1984)
46. Pei Veedu (1984)
47. January 1 (1984)
48. Vesham (1985)
49. Alai Osai (1985)
50. Rajathi Rojakili (1985)
51. Aasha (1985)
52. Kalyanam Oru Kalkattu (1985)
53. Nalla Thambi (1985)
54. Naan Sigappu Manithan (1985)
55. Naagam (1985)
56. Pudhu Yugam (1985)
57. Chain Jayapal (1985)
58. Navagraha Nayagi (1985)
59. Sivappu Nila (1985)
60. Raman Sreeraman (1985)
61. Chidambara Rahasiyam (1985)
62. Padikkadha Pannaiyar (1985)
63. Veettukkari (1985)
64. Nermai (1985)
65. Unakkaga Oru Roja (1985)
66. Karupu Sattaikaran (1985)
67. Engal Kural (1985)
68. Andha Oru Nimidam (1985)
69. Panam Pathum Seyyum (1985)
70. Vilangu Meen (1985)
71. Navagraha Nayagi (1985)
72. Arthamulla Aasaigal (1985)
73. Savi (1985)
74. Mayavi (1985)
75. Avan (1985)
76. Yemaatrathe Yemaaraathe (1985)
77. Hemavin Kadhalargal (1985)
78. Kovil Yaanai (1986)
79. Jeevanathi (1986)
80. Viduthalai (1986)
81. Mahasakthi Mariamman (1986)
82. Kaithiyin Theerpu (1986)
83. Pudhir (1986)
84. Enakku Nane Needipathi (1986)
85. Meendum Pallavi (1986)
86. Thazhuvatha Kaigal (1986)
87. Solvathellam Unmai (1987)
88. Kalyana Kacheri (1987)
89. Thangachi (1987)
90. Anjatha Singam (1987)
91. Makkal En Pakkam (1987)
92. Raja Mariyadhai (1987)
93. Veerapandiyan (1987)
94. Thendral Puyalanadhu (1989)
95. Rettai Kuzhal Thuppaki (1989)
96. Samsara Sangeetham (1989)
97. Sangu Pushpangal (1989)
98. Pudhu Mappillai (1989)
99. Vanakkam Vathiyare (1991)
100. Sathiyam Adhu Nichayam (1992)
101. Ponmaalai Pozhudhu (1993)
102. Chinna Mani (1995)
103. Rajali (1996)
104. Dhinamum Ennai Gavani (1997)
105. Thedinen Vanthathu (1997)
106. Ivan (2002)
107. Winner (2003)
108. Super Da (2004)
109. Gethu (2016)

=== Malayalam ===
1. Thulavarsham (1976)
2. Iniyaval Urangatte (1978)
3. Oolkatal (1979) as Thulasi
4. Koumara Praayam (1979)
5. Love in Singapore (1980)
6. Thadakam (1982) as Dancer
7. Aa Rathri (1982) as Dancer
8. Kaliya Mardhanam (1982) as Thulasi
9. Veedu (1982) as Maggi
10. Ente Kadha (1983)
11. Visa (1983) as Dancer
12. Oru Mukam Pala Mukham (1983) as Swapna
13. Aadhipathyam (1983)
14. Vaashi (1983)
15. Samrambam (1983)
16. Belt Mathai (1983) as Geetha
17. Himam (1983) as Dancer
18. Passport (1983) as Daisy
19. Arabikadal (1983)
20. Mortuary (1983)
21. Engane Nee Marakkum (1983) as Shanti
22. Attakkalasam (1983) as Usha
23. Coolie (1983) as Sreedevi
24. Swarna Gopuram (1984) as Dancer
25. Rajavembala (1984) as Neelima
26. Nishedi (1984)
27. Vetta (1984) as Kombu
28. Kurishuyudham (1984) as Dancer
29. Mynakam (1984)
30. Oru Sumangaliyude Katha (1984) as Sophia
31. Poomadhathe Pennu (1984) as Dancer
32. Shabadham (1984)
33. Jeevante Jeevan (1985)
34. Paurnami Raavil (1985)
35. Kiratham (1985) as Anu
36. Revenge (1985) as Susan
37. Ezhu Muthal Onpathu Vare (1985)
38. Chorakku Chora (1985) as Chandrika
39. Nerariyum Nerathu (1985) as Dancer
40. Katturani (1985)
41. Aanakkorumma (1985) as Anitha
42. Black Mail (1985) as Malu
43. Puzhayozhukum Vazhi (1985) as Resmi
44. Jwalanam (1985)
45. Shatru (1985)
46. Uyerthezhunelppu (1985) as Shobha
47. Ithu Nalla Thamasha (1985) as Prasanna
48. Pournami Rathriyil (1986)
49. Caberet Dancer (1986)
50. Ardharathri (1986)
51. Karinagam (1986)
52. Sakhavu (1986)
53. Bharya Oru Manthri (1986)
54. Railway Cross (1986)
55. Annoru Ravil (1986)
56. Pensimham (1986)
57. Kulambadikal (1986)
58. Kaalathinte Sabhdam (1987) as Valsala
59. Kalarathri (1987)
60. Avalude Kadha (1987)
61. Ee Noottandile Maharogam (1987)
62. Rajavembala
63. Vamban (1987)
64. Janma Shatru (1988) as Savithri Sankar
65. Bheekaran (1988) as Dancer
66. Karate Girls (1988)
67. Agnichirakulla Thumbi (1988)
68. Theruvu Narthaki (1988) as Radha
69. Maharajavu (1989)
70. Prabhatham Chuvanna Theruvil (1989)
71. Sunday 7 p.m. (1990)

=== Telugu ===
1. Gandharvya Kanya (1979)
2. Pancha Kalyani (1980)
3. Bhola Shankarudu (1980)
4. Love in Singapore (1980)
5. Maga Maharaju (1983)
6. Chandi Rani (1983)
7. Dharmaatmudu (1983)
8. Nayakulaku Saval (1984)
9. Kode Trachu (1984) as Asha
10. Aparadhi (1984)
11. Danavudu (1984)
12. Justice Chakravarthy (1984)
13. Srimathi Kavali (1984)
14. Bharatamlo Sankharavam (1984)
15. James Bond 999 (1984)
16. Ramudu Kadhu Krishnudu (1984) as Appala Narasamma
17. Tella Gulabeelu (1984)
18. Bangaru Kapuram (1984)
19. Mahanagaramlo Mayagadu (1984)
20. Dandayatra (1984) as Julie
21. Bhola Shankarudu (1984)
22. Mayaladi (1985) as Prathima
23. Prachanda Bhairavi (1985) as Nagakanya
24. Terror (1985) as Muthyalu
25. Chattamtho Poratam (1985)
26. Kotha Pelli Koothuru (1985)
27. Vande Mataram (1985)
28. Lady James Bond (1985)
29. Darja Donga (1985)
30. Kanchu Kavacham (1985)
31. Khooni (1985) as Laila
32. Mantra Dandam (1985) as Kanchana
33. Maa Inti Mahalakshmi as Mohini (1985)
34. Kongumudi(1985)
35. Mayadari Maridi (1985)
36. Visha Kanya (1985)
37. Maya Mohini (1985)
38. Vikram (1986)
39. Aakrandana (1986)
40. Cow Boy No. 1 (1986)
41. Repati Pourulu (1986)
42. Papikondalu (1986)
43. Simhasanam (1986)
44. Kondaveeti Raja (1986)
45. Chaitanyam (1986)
46. Krishna Garadi (1986)
47. Nippulanti Manishi (1986)
48. Khaidi Rani (1986)
49. Jailu Pakshi (1986)
50. Santhi Nivasam (1986)
51. Kaliyuga Krishnudu (1986)
52. Punnami Chandrudu (1987)
53. Veera Pratap (1987) as Kamini
54. Ramu (1987)
55. Dharmapatni (1987)
56. Aatma Bandhuvulu (1987)
57. Pagabattina Panchali (1987)
58. Veera Viharam (1987)
59. Gouthami (1987)
60. Kaboye Alludu (1987)
61. Hanthakudi Veta (1987)
62. Collector Vijaya (1988)
63. Gandipeta Rahasyam (1989)
64. Ajatha Satruvu (1989) as Lalasa
65. Aayudham (1990)
66. Ramudu Kadhu Rakshasudu (1991)
67. Orey Rikshaw (1995)
68. Bobbili Bullodu (1996)
69. Aata (2007)
70. Maya Bazaar (2010)

=== Kannada ===
1. Ondu Hennu Aaru Kannu (1980)...Rani
2. Lakshmi Kataksha (1981)
3. Prachanda Kulla (1982)
4. Gandugali Rama (1983)
5. Simha Gharjane (1983)...Roopa
6. Chinnadantha Maga (1983)
7. Ibbani Karagithu (1983)...Anitha
8. Jiddu (1984)
9. Prachanda Kulla (1984)
10. Onde Raktha (1984)
11. Male Banthu Male (1984)
12. Mooru Janma (1984)
13. Khaidi (1984)
14. Preethi Vathsalya (1984)
15. Benki Birugali (1984)
16. Mooroovare Vajragalu (1984)
17. Baddi Bangaramma (1984)...Kamala
18. Pavitra Prema (1984)...Rita
19. Naanu Nanna Hendthi (1985)
20. Kadina Raja (1985)
21. Ajeya (1985)
22. Kumkuma Tanda Sowbhagya (1985)
23. Jeevana Chakra (1985)
24. Bete (1986)
25. Beegara Pandhya (1986)
26. December 31 (1986)
27. Sangrama (1987)
28. Shubha Milana (1987)
29. Inspector Krantikumar (1987)
30. Matru Vatsalya (1988)
31. Olavina Aasare (1988)
32. Gudugu Sidilu (1988)
33. Hongkongnalli Agent Amar (1989)
34. Praja Prabhuthva (1989)
35. Shivanna (1993)
36. Mari Kannu Hori Myage (1998)

=== Hindi ===
1. Manzil Manzil (1984)
2. Haisiyat (1984)
3. Balidaan (1985)
4. Mahaguru (1985)
5. Singhasan (1986)
6. Pyaar Karke Dekho (1987)
7. Machalti Jawani (1989)

=== Oriya ===
1. Chakadola Karuchi Leela (1990)

=== Voice artist ===
For Nagma in the 2001 film Citizen.

== Television ==
Year	Series/Show	Role	Language	Channel
1997–2001	Antharangaalu	Nallapalli Meenakshi	Telugu	ETV
2009–2013	Thangam	Muttharasi	Tamil	Sun TV
2011–2014	Muthaaram	Rajalakshmi	Tamil	Sun TV
2013–2016; 2018	Deivamagal	Annapoorani	Tamil	Sun TV
2017	Ganga	Alangaara Naachiyaar	Tamil	Sun TV
2017–2019	Nenjam Marappathillai	Akilandeswari	Tamil	Star Vijay
2017–2018	Kalyanaparisu	Rajalakshmi	Tamil	Sun TV
2019	Agni Natchathiram	Gangadevi	Tamil	Sun TV
2019; 2021	Alitho Saradaga	Guest	Telugu	ETV
2021	Kannana Kanne	Kamala	Tamil	Sun TV
2021	Jothi		Tamil	Sun TV
2021	Thirumagal	Vanamadevi	Tamil	Sun TV
2022–2024	Chellamma	Maragatham	Tamil	Star Vijay
2022	Anbe Vaa	Visalatchi	Tamil	Sun TV
2022	Kanda Naal Mudhal	Thaai Kezhavi	Tamil	Colors Tamil
2023–2024	Mr. Manaivi	Ranjitham	Tamil	Sun TV
2025	Naanga Ready Neenga Ready Ah	Judge	Tamil	Sun TV
2025 – present	Parijatham	Devaki	Tamil	Zee Tamil
2025–2026	Chellame Chellame		Tamil	Sun TV
