= Ponkunnam Damodaran =

Ponkunnam Damodaran M. N. Damodaran
- Also known as: Ponkunnam Damodaran
- Born: 25 November 1915; Ponkunnam, British India
- Died: 24 November 1994 (aged 78)
- Occupations: Lyricist, poet, school teacher

Ponkunnam Damodaran (1915-1994) was an Indian poet, novelist, dramatist and communist supporter who was active from 1940 to 1970. He wrote the song "Pachappanamthate...", used in the Malayalam film Nottam. He was posthumously awarded the Kerala state award (best lyricist) for the song in 2006. He was born in Ponkunnam in Kottayam district of Kerala. Damodaran wrote the novels Sarpam kotthunna sathyangal, Aadarsam theechoolayanu. He also wrote plays including Mathamethaayaalum Manushyan Nannavanam and Rashtra Silpi. He wrote six songs with Vayalar Ramavarma in Nammalonnu-drama written by Cherukaadu. The song 'Irunaazhi manninnai urukunna karshakar irukaali maadukalaayirunnu' Pachappanamthathe punnarappoomuthe punnellin poonkarale' were written for this play with music by M.S. Babu Raj and sung by kozhikkode Abdul kader.

== List of songs used in films ==
No.	Year	Song	Film	Singer	Music director
1	2005	" Pachappanamthathe..."	Nottam	KJ Yesudas, Sujatha Mohan	M Jayachandran
2	2009	" Janaganamana..."	Mounam	Biju Narayanan, Madhu Balakrishnan, Jyotsna, Shoba	MD Rajendran
