= Sakhavu (1986 film) =

- Directed by: K. S. Gopalakrishnan
- Written by: Kallayam Krishnadas
- Screenplay by: Kallayam Krishnadas
- Produced by: Edappazhinji Velappan Nair
- Starring: Unnimary; Anuradha; Bheeman Raghu; Ramu
- Edited by: A. Sukumaran
- Music by: V. D. Rajappan
- Production company: Chithradesam Productions
- Distributed by: Chithradesam Productions
- Release date: 23 February 1986
- Country: India
- Language: Malayalam

Sakhavu is a 1986 Indian Malayalam film, directed by K. S. Gopalakrishnan and produced by Edappazhinji Velappan Nair. The film stars Unnimary, Anuradha, Bheeman Raghu and Ramu in the lead roles. The film has musical score by V. D. Rajappan.

== Cast ==
- Unnimary
- Anuradha
- Bheeman Raghu
- Ramu

== Soundtrack ==
The music was composed by V. D. Rajappan and the lyrics were written by Kallayam Krishnadas and Panthalam Sudhakaran.

No.	Song	Singers	Lyrics	Length (m:ss)
1	"Khalbinte"	Alice, Chorus, Madhubhaskar	Kallayam Krishnadas	
2	"Raktham Chinthi"	Chorus, Madhubhaskar	Panthalam Sudhakaran	
3	"Suralokam"	Alice	Panthalam Sudhakaran	
