= Ponnaniyathi =

- Directed by: R Krishnamoorthy
- Produced by: R Krishnamoorthy
- Release date: 19 February 1988
- Country: India
- Language: Malayalam

Ponnaniyathi is a 1988 Indian Malayalam film, directed by R Krishnamoorthy and produced by R Krishnamoorthy.

== Cast ==
Nizhalgal Ravi
