= Miss Stella =

Miss Stella (സടേലലാ)
- Directed by: I. Sasi
- Produced by: S. Kumar
- Music by: Raveendran
- Production company: Sastha Productions
- Distributed by: Sastha Productions
- Release date: 1991
- Country: India
- Language: Malayalam

Miss Stella is a 1991 Indian Malayalam film, directed by I. Sasi and produced by S. Kumar. The film has musical score by Raveendran.

== Soundtrack ==
The music was composed by Raveendran and the lyrics were written by Poovachal Khader.

No.	Song	Singers	Lyrics	Length (m:ss)
1	"Engine Fire Engine"	K. S. Chithra	Poovachal Khader	
2	"Happy New Year"	K. S. Chithra	Poovachal Khader	
3	"Kaiyyil Thenkinnam"	K. S. Chithra	Poovachal Khader	
