= Janmashathru =

- Directed by: K. S. Gopalakrishnan
- Produced by: Malithra Production
- Starring: Anuradha; Balan K. Nair; Bheeman Raghu
- Edited by: A. Sukumaran
- Music by: Cochin Alex
- Release date: 29 April 1988
- Country: India
- Language: Malayalam

Janmashathru is a 1988 Indian Malayalam film, directed by K. S. Gopalakrishnan and produced by Malithra Production. The film stars Anuradha, Balan K. Nair and Bheeman Raghu in the lead roles. The film has musical score by Cochin Alex.

== Cast ==
- Anuradha as Savithri
- Balan K. Nair as Avarachan
- Bheeman Raghu as SI Raghu
- Vincent as Nissar
- Nellikode Bhaskaran as Nanu Pilla
- Sathaar as Joji

== Soundtrack ==
The music was composed by Cochin Alex and the lyrics were written by Bharanikkavu Sivakumar and Varkala Sreekumar.

No.	Song	Singers	Lyrics	Length (m:ss)
1	"Kunkuma Sandhyakal"		Bharanikkavu Sivakumar, Varkala Sreekumar	
2	"Oh Sugandha Vanapushpangal"	K. S. Chithra, Krishnachandran	Bharanikkavu Sivakumar, Varkala Sreekumar	
3	"Oru Nimisham Pala Nimisham"	Vani Jairam	Bharanikkavu Sivakumar, Varkala Sreekumar	
4	"Ponnelassum Ponnalukkathum"	Chorus, Madhubhaskar	Bharanikkavu Sivakumar, Varkala Sreekumar	
