= Theruvu Narthaki =

- Directed by: N. Sankaran Nair
- Screenplay by: N. Sankaran Nair
- Produced by: S. Kumar
- Starring: Balan K. Nair; Bheeman Raghu; Geetha; Anuradha
- Cinematography: Prabhakar
- Edited by: G. Murali
- Music by: Vijayabhaskar
- Production company: Sastha Productions
- Distributed by: Sastha Productions
- Release date: 25 March 1988
- Country: India
- Language: Malayalam

Theruvu Narthaki is a 1988 Indian Malayalam film, directed by N. Sankaran Nair and produced by S. Kumar. The film stars Balan K. Nair, Bheeman Raghu, Geetha and Anuradha in the lead roles. The film has musical score by Vijayabhaskar.

== Cast ==
- Balan K. Nair
- Bheeman Raghu
- Geetha
- Anuradha
- Vincent

== Soundtrack ==
The music was composed by Vijayabhaskar.

No.	Song	Singers	Lyrics	Length (m:ss)
1	"Anthiyil Vidarana"	K. S. Chithra	Mankombu Gopalakrishnan	
2	"Muracherukkan Vannu"	K. S. Chithra, Sujatha Mohan	Mankombu Gopalakrishnan	
