= Onninu Purake Mattonnu =

- Directed by: Thulasidas
- Written by: Thulasidas
- Screenplay by: Thulasidas
- Produced by: Sundarlal Nahatha
- Starring: Thilakan; Nedumudi Venu; Ratheesh; Rohini
- Cinematography: P. Kumar
- Edited by: K. P. Hariharaputhran
- Music by: Kannur Rajan
- Production company: Melody Creations
- Distributed by: Melody Creations
- Release date: 25 March 1988
- Country: India
- Language: Malayalam

Onninu Purake Mattonnu is a 1988 Indian Malayalam-language film, directed by Thulasidas and produced by Sundarlal Nahatha. The film stars Thilakan, Nedumudi Venu, Ratheesh and Rohini in the lead roles. The film has musical score by Kannur Rajan.

== Cast ==
- Thilakan
- Nedumudi Venu
- Ratheesh
- Rohini
- Devan
- M. G. Soman
- Mala Aravindan
- Santhakumari
- Shari

== Production ==
Mohanlal was initially considered for the main role, however couldn't as his date diary was full.

== Soundtrack ==
The music was composed by Kannur Rajan with lyrics by Poovachal Khader.

No.	Song	Singers	Lyrics	Length (m:ss)
1	"Hridaya Swaram"	K. J. Yesudas, K. S. Chithra	Poovachal Khader	
2	"Irul Moodum"	K. J. Yesudas	Poovachal Khader	
