= Bheekaran =

- Directed by: Prem
- Produced by: Prem
- Starring: Rajkumar; Bheeman Raghu; Madhuri
- Music by: G. Devarajan
- Release date: 19 February 1988
- Country: India
- Language: Malayalam

Bheekaran is a 1988 Indian Malayalam film, directed and produced by Prem. The film stars Rajkumar, Bheeman Raghu, Madhuri in the lead roles. The film has musical score by G. Devarajan.

== Story ==
An action film ... Beeman and other workers protest in front of factory to get extra compensation money for their hard work and low pay. Beeman is called inside by factory owner Somashekaran. An argument happens as Somashekaran tries to bribe Beeman. Beeman beats Somashekaran after Somashekaran beat at Beeman. Police arrest Beeman and the rumour spreads that Beeman stole money from Somashekaran. Beeman enters into a hard phase of life. Beeman's girlfriend's father tells Beeman not to come to his house anymore and their love and marriage will not happen anymore. The brother-in-law says that till his dowry amount is paid, Beeman's sister cannot live with her husband. The mother of Beeman blames Beeman for inviting a bad name for the family and Beeman's father becomes paralysed and gets a breathing problem. Beeman calls a doctor to urgently attend to his father, but the doctor asks for money and a car to drop him to his house. Beeman gets angry and takes the doctor away from the clinic to his house, but on reaching the house, his father was already dead. Everybody keeps criticising Beeman for stealing money, for which Beeman says that he is innocent. Now, in front of the labour office, workers tell themselves that Beeman won't stand anymore after stealing the money and they will beat Beeman. Hearing this, Beeman get angry and fights with all the workers. By this time police arrive, but Beeman runs away get shot and lost in the sea to another area. Here, T. G. Ravi enters, saves Beeman and gives money to Beeman for giving a gift to Somashekaran's wife, who rejected him previously. The gift is a rocket shape with bomb inside. Beeman at the end gives the present to Somashekaran's wife, who is an advocate shown in the beginning of film who bails out Beeman after getting arrested for beating Somashekaran. The film ends with Beeman rising to the situation.

== Cast ==
- Rajkumar
- Bheeman Raghu
- Madhuri
- Ravi Menon
- Sabitha Anand
- T. G. Ravi

== Soundtrack ==
The music was composed by G. Devarajan and the lyrics were written by Yusufali Kechery and Poovachal Khader.

| No. | Song | Singers | Lyrics | Length (m:ss) |
|---|---|---|---|---|
| 1 | "Karimbinte Villum" | K. J. Yesudas | Yusufali Kechery | |
| 2 | "Swargam Swargam" | K. J. Yesudas, P. Madhuri | Yusufali Kechery | |
| 3 | "Youvanam Arulum" | Vani Jairam | Poovachal Khader | |
