= Ithu Oru Thudakkom Mathram =

- Directed by: Baby
- Produced by: V. Rajan
- Music by: Rajamani
- Production company: Gireesh Pictures
- Distributed by: Gireesh Pictures
- Release date: 2 May 1986
- Country: India
- Language: Malayalam

Ithu Oru Thudakkom Mathram is a 1986 Indian Malayalam film, directed by Baby and produced by V. Rajan. The film has musical score by Rajamani.

== Cast ==
- Ratheesh
- Devan
- T. G. Ravi
- Balan K. Nair
- C. I. Paul
- Ramu
- Prathapachandran
- Sumithra

== Soundtrack ==
The music was composed by Rajamani and the lyrics were written by Vasan and U. Radhakrishnan.

No.	Song	Singers	Lyrics	Length (m:ss)
1	"Aa Marathil"	K. J. Yesudas, K. S. Chithra	Vasan	
2	"Aa Marathil"	K. S. Chithra, Baby Roopa	Vasan	
3	"Thaare Raagadhaare"	K. J. Yesudas	U. Radhakrishnan	
