= Yudham =

- Directed by: J. Sasikumar
- Written by: K. P. Kottarakkara
- Screenplay by: Kaloor Dennis
- Produced by: K. P. Kottarakkara
- Starring: Prem Nazir; Madhu; Ratheesh; Poornima Jayaram
- Cinematography: Manohar
- Edited by: K. Sankunni
- Music by: Shankar–Ganesh
- Production company: Ganesh Pictures
- Distributed by: Ganesh Pictures
- Release date: 16 September 1983
- Country: India
- Language: Malayalam

Yudham is a 1983 Indian Malayalam language film, directed by J. Sasikumar and produced by K. P. Kottarakkara. The film stars Prem Nazir, Madhu, Ratheesh and Poornima Jayaram. The film has musical score by Shankar–Ganesh.

== Cast ==
- Prem Nazir as Bappootty
- Madhu as Ramu
- Ratheesh as Prabhakara Menon, Rajesh (double role)
- Poornima Jayaram as Sheela
- Srividya as Aysha
- Janaki as Young Sheela
- Sudhakar as Young Salim
- K. R. Savithri as Malathy
- Balan K Nair as Velu / K.V.K
- Sankaradi as Esthappan
- Sukumari as Bhageerathi
- Ramu as Vinod
- KP Kumar as Babu
- Devi as Usha
- Thodupuzha Radhakrishnan as Madhusudhanan
- Kunchan as Flirt
- Sabitha Anand as Radha
- Radhadevi as Annamma teacher
- Chandra as Diana
- Anuradha
- Janaki

== Soundtrack ==
The music was composed by Shankar–Ganesh and the lyrics were written by Poovachal Khader.

No.	Song	Singers	Lyrics	Length (m:ss)
1	"Kanyakamaarkkoru"	S. P. Balasubrahmanyam	Poovachal Khader	
2	"Karimbo Kaniyo"	P. Jayachandran, Vani Jairam	Poovachal Khader	
3	"Onappoovukal Virunnu Vannu" (Duniyavil Swargathin)	P. Jayachandran, Jolly Abraham	Poovachal Khader	
4	"Thaarunyathin Aaraamathil"	Vani Jairam, S. P. Balasubrahmanyam	Poovachal Khader	
