= America America (disambiguation) =

America America is a 1963 film directed by Elia Kazan.

America America may refer to:

- America America (1983 film), an Indian Malayalam film
- America! America!!, a 1997 Indian Kannada film
- America America (book), a 1962 book by Elia Kazan, the source of his film
- America America (album), a 2012 album by BeBe Winans
- "América, América" (song), 1973 song by Nino Bravo

== See also ==
- America (disambiguation)
