= Kooduthedunna Parava =

- Directed by: P. K. Joseph
- Written by: P. K. Joseph
- Produced by: Thiruppathi Chettiyar
- Starring: Ratheesh; Captain Raju; Balan K Nair; Jalaja
- Music by: A. T. Ummer
- Production company: Evershine Productions
- Distributed by: Evershine Productions
- Release date: 2 March 1984
- Country: India
- Language: Malayalam

Kooduthedunna Parava is a 1984 Indian Malayalam film, directed by P. K. Joseph and produced by Thiruppathi Chettiyar. The film stars Ratheesh, Captain Raju, Balan K. Nair and Jalaja in the lead roles. The film has musical score by A. T. Ummer.

== Cast ==
- Ratheesh as Gopi
- Captain Raju as Sub-inspector
- Balan K. Nair as Khader kakka
- Jalaja as Salma
- Jose as Salim
- T. G. Ravi as Surendran
- Kunchan as Gopan
- Meena as Sarasamma
- Prathapachandran as Setji
- Syamala Gouri as Savithri
- Vallathol Unnikrishnan as constable Kuttan Pilla
- Master Suresh as Ramu
- Rajendran as Subinspector

== Soundtrack ==
The music was composed by A. T. Ummer and the lyrics were written by Poovachal Khader.

| No. | Song | Singers | Lyrics | Length (m:ss) |
|---|---|---|---|---|
| 1 | "Pavizhamunthirithoppil" | K. J. Yesudas, Ambili, Chorus | Poovachal Khader | |
