= Ashtabandham =

1986 film directed by Askar

- Directed by: Askar
- Written by: Sreemoolanagaram Mohan; Hassan (dialogues)
- Screenplay by: Hassan
- Produced by: Areefa Hassan
- Starring: Srividya; Mukesh; Shankar; Balan K. Nair
- Edited by: K. P. Hariharaputhran
- Music by: A. T. Ummer
- Production company: Arifa Combines
- Distributed by: Arifa Combines
- Release date: 25 December 1986
- Country: India
- Language: Malayalam

Ashtabandham is a 1986 Indian Malayalam-language film, directed by Askar and produced by Areefa Hassan. The film stars Srividya, Mukesh, Shankar and Balan K. Nair in the lead roles. The film has musical score by A. T. Ummer.

== Cast ==
- Srividya as Jameela
- Mukesh as Johnny
- Shankar as Abdu
- Mucherla Aruna as Ambika Antharjanam
- Balan K. Nair as Psharady Mashu
- Kuthiravattam Pappu as Kunjali
- Seema as Ayisha
- Sukumari as Amina
- Nellikode Bhaskaran as Hajiyar
- Lissy as Subaida
- Bahadoor as Warrier
- Kalaranjini as Savithri
- Nedumudi Venu as Kunjunni
- T. G. Ravi as Majeed
- Sankaradi as Jamath President
- Paravoor Bharathan as Adruman
- Captain Raju as Sulaiman
- Prathapachandran as Sankaran Nair
- Santo Krishnan as Gunda
- P. R. Menon as Saithalikka
- Mela Raghu as Jamath member

== Soundtrack ==
The music was composed by A. T. Ummer and the lyrics were written by Chowalloor Krishnankutty and O. V. Abdullah.

No.	Song	Singers	Lyrics	Length (m:ss)
1	"Aalolam Kili"	K. J. Yesudas, K. S. Chithra	Chowalloor Krishnankutty	
2	"Manushyan Ethra Manoharamaaya Padam"	K. J. Yesudas	O. V. Abdullah	
3	"Maveli Thampuraan"	K. J. Yesudas, Ashalatha, Chorus	Chowalloor Krishnankutty, O. V. Abdullah	
