= Thirakkil Alppa Samayam =

- Directed by: P. G. Vishwambharan
- Written by: Kanam E. J. A. Sheriff (dialogues)
- Screenplay by: Pappanamkodu Lakshmanan
- Produced by: Babu Xavier
- Starring: Mammootty; Madhu; Thilakan; Shankar; Menaka
- Cinematography: C. E. Babu
- Edited by: G. Murali
- Music by: Shyam
- Production companies: Vijaya & Vijaya
- Distributed by: Vijaya & Vijaya
- Release date: 31 August 1984
- Running time: 134 minutes
- Country: India
- Language: Malayalam

Thirakkil Alppa Samayam is a 1984 Indian Malayalam-language film, directed by P. G. Vishwambharan. The film stars Madhu, Thilakan, Shankar and Menaka. The film has musical score by Shyam.

== Cast ==
- Madhu as Khadar
- Mammootty as Antony
- Shankar as Rahim
- Balan K. Nair
- Thilakan as Shankaran Nair
- Bheeman Raghu
- T. G. Ravi
- Ramu
- G. K. Pillai
- Mala Aravindan as Paramu
- Menaka
- Seema as Sarala
- Rohini
- Shubha

== Soundtrack ==
The music was composed by Shyam and the lyrics were written by Chunakkara Ramankutty.

No.	Song	Singers	Lyrics	Length (m:ss)
1	"Kadaleevanavum Kaavum"	K. J. Yesudas	Chunakkara Ramankutty	
2	"Makkathe Chandrika Pole" (Poomakalane)	P. Susheela	Chunakkara Ramankutty	
3	"Ragardramay Malarvadiyil"	K. J. Yesudas	Chunakkara Ramankutty	
4	"Vyoohame Chakravyoohame"	K. J. Yesudas	Chunakkara Ramankutty	

== Box office ==
The film was a commercial success.
