= Ardha Raathri =

1986 film directed by Asha Khan

- Directed by: Asha Khan
- Written by: Swaraj; Dr. Pavithran (dialogues)
- Screenplay by: Dr. Pavithran
- Produced by: Swaraj
- Starring: Ratheesh; Madhuri; Captain Raju; Anuradha
- Cinematography: Melly Dayalan
- Edited by: G. Murali
- Music by: K. J. Joy
- Production company: Sree Mookambika Entertains
- Distributed by: Sree Mookambika Entertains
- Release date: 7 February 1986
- Country: India
- Language: Malayalam

Ardha Raathri is a 1986 Indian Malayalam film, directed by Asha Khan and produced by Swaraj. The film stars Ratheesh, Madhuri, Captain Raju and Anuradha in the lead roles. The film has musical score by K. J. Joy.

== Cast ==
- Ratheesh
- Madhuri
- Captain Raju
- Anuradha
- Babitha Justin
- Bheeman Raghu
- Disco Shanti
- Kundara Johnny
- T. G. Ravi
- Nalinikanth

== Soundtrack ==
The music was composed by K. J. Joy and the lyrics were written by Bharanikkavu Sivakumar.

| No. | Song | Singers | Length (m:ss) |
|---|---|---|---|
| 1 | "Panchamiraavil" | Vani Jairam | |
| 2 | "Sirayil Lahari" | Vani Jairam | |
| 3 | "Thenkinnam" | Anitha Reddy | |
