= Mortuary (1983 film) =

- Poster
- Directed by: Baby
- Screenplay by: V. K. Pavithran
- Produced by: K. Pushparajan
- Starring: Prem Nazir; Madhu; Shankar Panikkar; Balan K. Nair
- Cinematography: K. B. Dayalan
- Music by: K. J. Joy
- Release date: 12 August 1983
- Country: India
- Language: Malayalam

Mortuary is a 1983 Indian Malayalam film, directed by Baby and produced by K. Pushparajan. The film stars Prem Nazir, Madhu, Shankar Panikkar and Balan K. Nair in the lead roles. The film has musical score by K. J. Joy. The film was remade in Tamil as Amma Pillai (1990).

Mortuary is based upon a real incident which happened in the Kottayam Medical College in the year 1977. There was a bet between two medical students to nab a cigarette from a dead body kept in a mortuary at 12 o'clock midnight. When one of the students came to take the cigarette, the dead body swallowed the cigarette and the student died due to the shock. The real culprit was the other student who was present in the mortuary lying in between the dead bodies. Police arrested the other student responsible for the death.

== Cast ==
- Prem Nazir as DySP Rajashekhara Menon
- Srividya as Justice Lakshmi Menon
- Ramu as Satheesh
- Madhu as Adv. Krishnadas
- Shankar Panikkar as Venu
- Swapna as Sindhu
- Balan K. Nair as Narendran
- Maniyan Pilla Raju as Jacob
- Captain Raju as Raju
- C. I. Paul as Williams
- T. G. Ravi as Zachariah, Public Prosecutor
- Kuthiravattam Pappu as Watchman Gopalan
- Jagannatha Varma as Adithyan Kurup, College Principal
- Anuradha
- Chandraji as Pattalam Pisharody
- Kaval Surendran
- Gopalakrishnan
- Hari
- Sundanda
- Juby
- Radha

== Soundtrack ==
The music was composed by K. J. Joy and the lyrics were written by Poovachal Khader.

No.	Song	Singer	Length (m:ss)
1	"Amritha Sarassile"	K. J. Yesudas	
2	"Niyamangal Oru Bhaagam"	K. J. Yesudas	
