= Black Mail (1985 film) =

1985 film

- Directed by: Crossbelt Mani
- Produced by: Ratheesh; Sathar
- Starring: Ratheesh; Sathaar; Anuradha; Kuthiravattam Pappu
- Cinematography: Crossbelt Mani
- Edited by: Chakrapani
- Music by: Guna Singh
- Production company: Jaid Film
- Distributed by: Jaid Film
- Release date: 5 October 1985
- Country: India
- Language: Malayalam

Black Mail is a 1985 Indian Malayalam film, directed by Crossbelt Mani and produced by Ratheesh and Sathar. The film stars Ratheesh, Sathaar, Anuradha and Kuthiravattam Pappu in the lead roles. The film has musical score by Guna Singh.

== Cast ==
- Ratheesh as SI Vijayan
- Balan K. Nair as Mooppan
- Sathaar as Suresh
- Anuradha as Malu
- Kuthiravattam Pappu as Thankayyan
- Mala Aravindan as Manikyam
- Jayamalini as Malini (Paravedi)
- Ramu as Rajesh
- Kundara Johnny as Johnny
- Ravi Menon as Jambu
- Hari as D.I.G.
- Kaduvakulam Antony as Kelu
- Madhuri as Chembakam
- Nellikode Bhaskaran as Chembakaraman Thampi
- Santo Krishnan as Aadivasi

== Soundtrack ==
The music was composed by Guna Singh and the lyrics were written by Bharanikkavu Sivakumar.

| No. | Song | Singers | Lyrics | Length (m:ss) |
|---|---|---|---|---|
| 1 | "Kaaveriyaaril" | Krishnachandran, Lathika | Bharanikkavu Sivakumar | |
| 2 | "Thenaarikkaattil" | Chorus, Lathika | Bharanikkavu Sivakumar | |
