= Ammavanu Pattiya Amali =

- Directed by: Augustine Prakash
- Starring: Mukesh; Thilakan
- Edited by: G.Murali
- Music by: A. T. Ummer; Mohan Sithara (score)
- Release date: 1989
- Country: India
- Language: Malayalam

Ammavanu Pattiya Amali is a 1989 Indian Malayalam film, directed by Augustine Prakash, starring Mukesh and Thilakan in the lead roles.

== Cast ==
- Mukesh as Suresh
- Thilakan as Sreedara menon
- KPAC Lalitha as Sethulakshmi
- T. G. Ravi as Narayanan
- Lizy as Sulojana
- Innocent as Ravunni
- Kuthiravattam Pappu as Kuttan Nair
- Lalu Alex as Sreenivasan
- Jagathy Sreekumar as Johnson
- Mala Aravindan as Thomson
- Kundara Johnny as Vasu
- K. P. A. C. Sunny
- Unnimary as Barghavi
- Thodupuzha Vasanthi
- Aloor Elsy
- Disco Shanti
- Sugandhi

== Soundtrack ==
The music was composed by A. T. Ummer and the lyrics were written by M. D. Rajendran

No.	Song	Singers	Lyrics
1	"Melle Melle"	Uma Maheswari	M. D. Rajendran
2	"Neelappooviriyum"	Minmini	M. D. Rajendran
3	"Thennalin Therileri"	G. Venugopal, Ashalatha	M. D. Rajendran
4	"Thoovaanam Pulki Pulki"	K. J. Yesudas	M. D. Rajendran
