= Kundara Johny =

Indian actor (1951–2023)

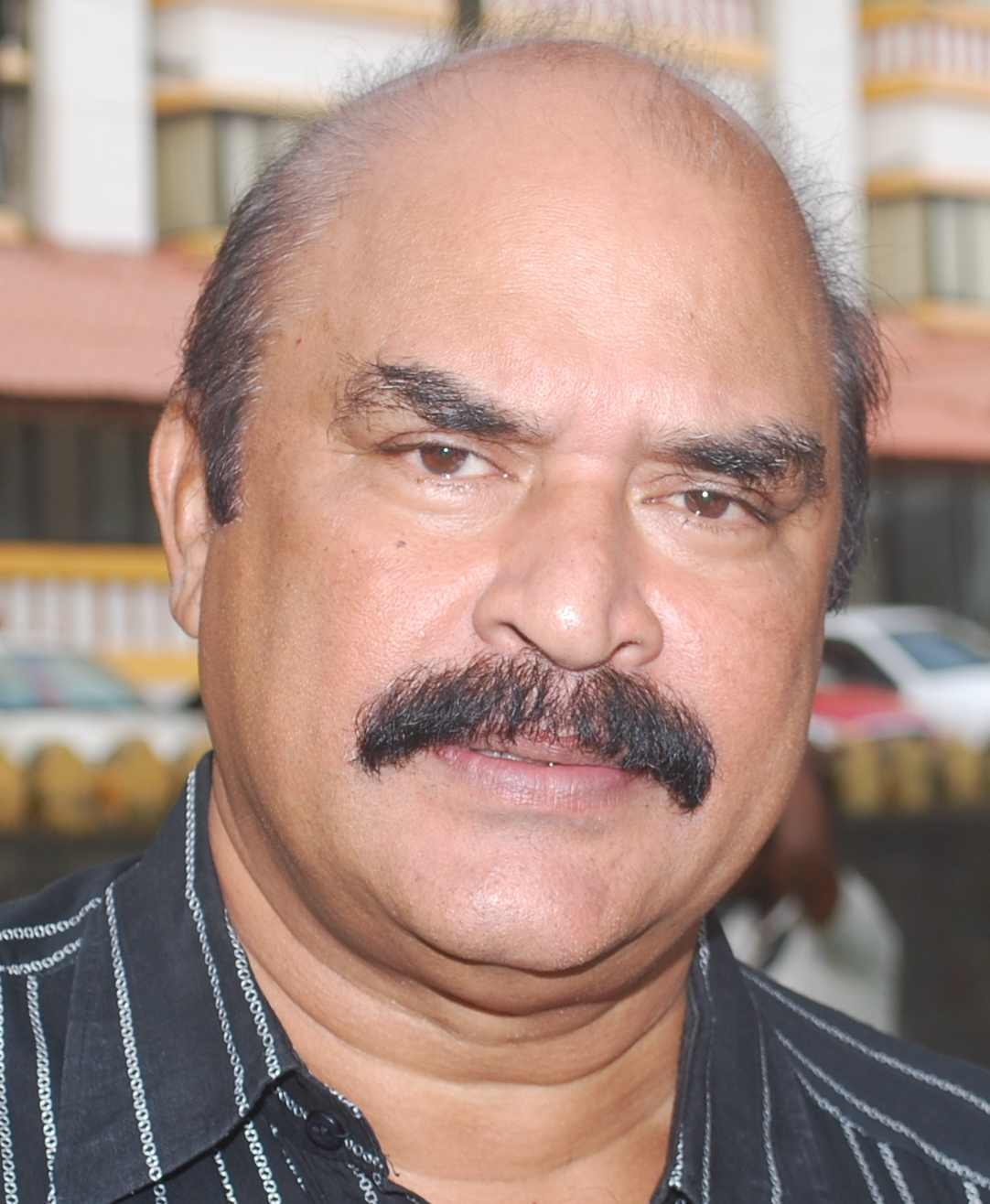
- Born: Johny Joseph; 1 January 1952; Quilon, Travancore–Cochin, India
- Died: 17 October 2023 (aged 71); Kollam, Kerala, India
- Occupation: Actor
- Years active: 1979–2023
- Spouse: Stella Johny
- Parent: Catherine (Mother)

Johny Joseph, better known by the stage name Kundara Johny (1 January 1952 – 17 October 2023), was an Indian actor in Malayalam cinema. He additionally performed in Tamil films such as Vaazhkai Chakram and Nadigan.

== Early life ==
Johny made his debut, at the age of 23, through the 1979 Malayalam movie, Nithya Vasantham, playing a 55-year-old character.

== Personal life and death ==
Johny was married to Stella, a Hindi professor at Fatima Mata National College, Kollam. He died of a heart attack at a private hospital in Kollam, on 17 October 2023, at the age of 71.

== Filmography ==
=== Malayalam ===
Year	Title	Role	Notes
1979	Agniparvatham		
1979	Nithya Vasantham		
1979	Kazhukan		
1980	Rajaneegandhi		
1980	Nattuchakkeruttu		
1980	Meen	Sunny	
1980	Karimpana		
1981	Urukkumushthikal		
1981	Thushaaram	Cap. Nair	
1981	Parankimala	Chandran	
1981	Visham	Johnny	
1981	Karimpoocha		
1981	Aayudham	Johny	
1981	Tharattu	Johny	
1982	Angachamayam	Sony	
1982	Enikkum Oru Divasam	S.I. Jacob	
1982	Vidhichathum Kothichathum		
1982	Chilanthivala	Inspector Harris	
1982	Varanmaare Aavashyamundu	Gunda	
1982	Komaram		
1983	Ee Yugam	Vaasu	
1983	Himam	Gireesh	
1983	Oru Madapravinte Katha		
1983	Paalam		
1983	Aadyathe Anuraagam	Rasheed	
1983	Onnu Chirikku		
1984	Veendum Chalikkunna Chakram	Raghavan Nair	
1984	Enganeyundashaane	Suresh	
1984	Oru Painkilikatha	Nandakumar I.A.S	
1984	Thathamme Poocha Poocha		
1984	Swanthamevide Bandhamevide	Sreedharan	
1984	Unaroo		
1984	Athirathram	Govindankutty	
1984	Adiyozhukkukal	Govindan	
1984	Aalkkoottathil Thaniye	Gopinath	
1985	Aram + Aram = Kinnaram	Gunda	
1985	Angadikkappurathu	Anthony Varghese	
1985	Paara		
1985	Vellarikka Pattanam	Muthu	
1985	Adhyayam Onnu Muthal	Sreedharan	
1985	Mukhayamanthri		
1985	Oru Naal Innoru Naal		
1985	Black Mail	Johnny	
1985	Idanilangal	Kuttappan	
1985	Karimpinpoovinakkare	Kunjachan	
1986	Vartha	Francis	
1986	Adiverukal	Kootuvadi Vasu	
1986	Niramulla Ravulkal	Contractor Peethambaran	
1986	Njan Kathorthirikkum		
1986	Onnu Randu Moonnu		
1986	Nilaavinte Naattil	Inspector John	
1986	Urukku Manushyan		
1986	Ardha Raathri		
1986	Rajavinte Makan	Venu	
1986	Ninnistham Ennishtam	Achu	
1986	Ithile Iniyum Varu	Rajesh	
1986	Aavanazhi	CI Alex George	
1986	Nyayavidhi	Vareeth	
1986	Aayiram Kannukal	Johnny	
1986	Padayani		
1987	Naalkavala	Sub Inspector Andrews	
1987	Vrutham	Harindran	
1987	Amrutham Gamaya	Dr. Rajan Thomas	
1987	Kayyethum Doorathu		
1987	Ajantha		
1987	Theekattu	James	
1987	Nombarathi Poovu		
1987	Ithrayum Kaalam	Raju	
1987	Adimakal Udamakal	Joseph	
1987	Itha Samayamayi	Johny	
1987	Nadodikkattu	Nambiar's henchman	
1988	Oru CBI Diary Kurippu	Driver Vasu	
1988	Abkari	Peethambaran	
1988	1921	Police Inspector Narayana Menon	
1988	Mukthi	James	
1989	Kireedom	Parameshwaran	
1989	Carnivel	Pocker	
1989	Ammavanu Pattiya Amali	Vasu	
1989	Peruvannapurathe Visheshangal	Gopala Kuruppu	
1989	Oru Vadakkan Veeragatha	Aringodar's Sishyan	
1990	Aaram Vardil Aabhayandhara Kalakam		
1990	Mukham	Menon	
1990	Arhatha	Achu	
1990	Shubhayathra		
1990	Appu	Vijayan	
1991	Aanaval Mothiram	C.I George	
1991	Godfather	Hemachandran	
1991	Nayam Vyakthamakkunnu		
1991	Inspector Balram	CI Alex George	
1992	Kallan Kappalil Thanne	Cheenkanni Ramu	
1992	Thalastaanam		
1992	Sathyaprathinja		
1992	Mahanagaram	Commissioner Shankar	
1993	Devaasuram	Ashokan	
1993	Koushalam	C.I. Thomas Mathew	
1993	Uppukandam Brothers	Ettuveettil Vasu	
1993	Samooham	Anto	
1993	Chenkol	Parameshwaran	
1993	Thalamura		
1993	Sakshal Sreeman Chathunni	Bhargavan	
1993	Kulapathi	Antappan	
1993	Kabooliwala	Balan	
1993	Injakkadan Mathai & Sons		
1994	Chukkan	Ganapathi	
1994	Nandini Oppol		
1994	Betaaj Badshah		
1994	Sagaram Sakshi	K.K. Nair	
1995	Spadikam	Maniyan	
1995	Sindoora Rekha	Circle Inspector	
1995	Special Squad	Freddy	
1995	Radholsavam	Katturan	
1995	Keerthanam		
1995	Rajakeeyam		
1995	Indian Military Intelligence	Captain Sharma/Akbar	
1995	Sakshyam	Major	
1995	Kusruthikaatu		
1996	Hitlist		
1996	Swarnakireedam		
1996	Chhote Sarkar		Hindi film
1996	Kanjirappally Kariachan	Kalloorkaadan Koshi	
1997	Aaraam Thampuran	Appan's henchmen	
1997	Vamsam	Palakkunnel Thommichan	
1997	Varnapakittu	Adv. Chandrashekharan	
1998	Samaantharangal	Roy	
1999	Bharya Veettil Paramasukham	Ramabhadran	
1999	Thachiledathu Chundan	Thankayya Mooppan	
1999	Crime File	Pappachan	
2000	Dada Sahib	Inspector Ashokan	
2001	Saivar Thirumeni	Bhaskara Menon	
2002	Www.anukudumbam.com		
2002	Nakshathrakkannulla Rajakumaran Avanundoru Rajakumari	Kunju Raman	
2005	Bharathchandran I.P.S.	IG Rajan Koshy IPS	
2005	The Tiger	Customs Assistant Collector Venugopal	
2006	Madhuchandralekha	Shanmugham	
2006	Balram vs. Tharadas	DYSP Alex George	
2006	Bhargavacharitham Moonam Khandam	Jabbar	
2007	Avan Chandiyude Makan	Bhargavan M.L.A.	
2007	Time		
2007	Khaki	S.P Mahesh	
2007	Hallo	Commissioner Aravindakshan	
2008	Jubilee		
2008	Roudram	DYSP Habeeb	
2009	Kutty Srank	DySP Mathai	
2010	Pokkiriraja	Chandrashekharan	
2011	Ninnishtam Ennishtam 2		
2011	Venicile Vyapari	C.I. Nambeeshan	
2011	August 15	Rajeevan	
2012	Sthalam		
2013	My Fan Ramu	Commissioner Sathyasheelan	
2014	Swaha		
2014	Konthayum Poonoolum	Sandeep Mohan	
2015	Mariyam Mukku	DYSP Paul	
2015	Kohinoor	Superintendent of Police	
2015	ATM	Police Inspector	
2016	Payyamvalli Chanthu		
2016	Cellphone		
2016	Popcorn	Sam Christy	
2018	Vallikkudilile Vellakkaran	Kaimal	
2019	Thelivu	Retired Jail Superintendent	
2019	Mr. Pavanayi 99.99		
2022	Meppadiyan	Jacob	

=== Tamil ===
Year	Film	Role
2007	Kireedam	

=== Telugu ===
Year	Film	Role
2010	Rowdyism Nasinchal	

=== Kannada ===
Year	Film	Role
1991	Modadha Mareyalli	

== Television ==
Year	Series	Channel
2011	Kadhayile Rajakumari	Mazhavil Manorama
2017	Nilavum Nakshatrangalum	Amrita TV
2017	CBI Diary	Mazhavil Manorama
2018-2020	Bhadra	Surya TV
