= Hamsa Geetham =

- Directed by: I. V. Sasi
- Written by: T. Damodaran
- Screenplay by: T. Damodaran
- Starring: Ratheesh; Balan K. Nair; Kuthiravattam Pappu
- Cinematography: C. E. Babu; Chandramohan
- Edited by: K. Narayanan
- Music by: Shyam; Lyrics: Bichu Thirumala; Sathyan Anthikad
- Production company: Sreemookambika Creations
- Distributed by: Sreemookambika Creations
- Release date: 27 November 1981
- Country: India
- Language: Malayalam

Hamsa Geetham is a 1981 Indian Malayalam film, directed by I. V. Sasi. The film stars Ratheesh, Balan K. Nair and Kuthiravattam Pappu in the lead roles. The film has musical score by Shyam.

== Cast ==
- Ratheesh
- Seema
- Balan K. Nair
- Kuthiravattam Pappu
- P. K. Abraham
- Jayaprabha
- Indrapani

== Soundtrack ==
The music was composed by Shyam and the lyrics were written by Bichu Thirumala and Sathyan Anthikad.

No.	Song	Singers	Lyrics	Length (m:ss)
1	"Chanchala Noopura Thaalam"	S. Janaki	Bichu Thirumala	
2	"Devi Ninte"	K. J. Yesudas	Sathyan Anthikad	
3	"Ee Swaram"	S. Janaki, Kalyani Menon	Sathyan Anthikad	
4	"Kannil Naanam"	S. Janaki, Chorus	Sathyan Anthikad	
