= Attimari =

- Theatrical release poster
- Directed by: J. Sasikumar
- Written by: P. K. Sarangapani
- Produced by: Pushparajan
- Starring: Prem Nazir; Jayabharathi; Sreenath; Mohanlal
- Cinematography: Rajkumar
- Edited by: K. Arif
- Music by: K. J. Joy
- Production company: Raja Pushpa Films
- Distributed by: Benney & Ceekey Release
- Release date: 21 August 1981
- Country: India
- Language: Malayalam

Attimari (transl. Coup) is a 1981 Indian Malayalam-language film directed by J. Sasikumar, written by P. K. Sarangapani and produced by Pushparajan. The film stars Prem Nazir, Jayabharathi, Sreenath and Mohanlal . The film has musical score by K. J. Joy. The film was a commercial success at the box office.

== Plot ==
When a man finds his wife cheating on him, he leaves her and brings up his son on his own. Years later, his fortune changes, but he is forced to face the demons of his past.

== Cast ==
- Prem Nazir as Soman
- Jayabharathi
- Sreenath as Babu
- Mohanlal as Shan
- Srividya
- Thampi Kannanthanam
- Balan K. Nair
- Kuthiravattam Pappu as Salim
- T.G Ravi
- Prathapachandran

== Soundtrack ==
The music was composed by K. J. Joy and the lyrics were written by Poovachal Khader and Pappanamkodu Lakshmanan.

No.	Song	Singers	Lyrics	Length (m:ss)
1	"Anuraaga Kalike"	K. J. Yesudas	Poovachal Khader	
2	"Madanapoovanathile Puthumani Maaran"	Chorus, Rajan	Pappanamkodu Lakshmanan	
3	"Pakaraam Njan Paanamunthiri"	S. Janaki	Pappanamkodu Lakshmanan	
