= Neeyallengil Njan =

- Directed by: Vijayakrishnan
- Written by: Pappanamkodu Lakshmanan
- Screenplay by: Pappanamkodu Lakshmanan
- Produced by: Hassan
- Starring: Jagathy Sreekumar; Sindhu; Captain Raju; Balan K. Nair
- Cinematography: Melly Dayalan
- Edited by: K. Sankunni
- Production company: HNS Productions
- Distributed by: HNS Productions
- Release date: 20 March 1987
- Country: India
- Language: Malayalam

Neeyallengil Njan is a 1987 Indian Malayalam-language film, directed by Vijayakrishnan and produced by Hassan. The film stars Jagathy Sreekumar, Sindhu, Captain Raju and Balan K. Nair in the lead roles.

== Cast ==
- Jagathy Sreekumar as Ramankutty
- Sindhu as Thankamma
- Captain Raju as Omaka
- Balan K. Nair as Chandrashekharan
- Bheeman Raghu as Tiger Ramu
- Sangita Madhavan Nair as Syamala
- T. G. Ravi as Das Mavunkal
- Gomathi as Thulasi/Sarojini
- Bahadoor as Velayudhan Pilla
- Kaduvakulam Antony as Philip
- Bobby Kottarakkara as Kuttappan
- Ramu as Vinod
- Vanchiyoor Radha as Balachandran's mother
- Prathapachandran as Shekhar
- Disco Shanthi in item number
