= Surabhi Yaamangal =

- Directed by: P. Ashok Kumar
- Produced by: EVR Enterprises
- Starring: Jagathy Sreekumar; Ratheesh; Sukumaran; Balan K. Nair
- Music by: Kannur Rajan
- Production company: EVR Enterprises
- Distributed by: EVR Enterprises
- Release date: 9 September 1986
- Country: India
- Language: Malayalam

Surabhi Yaamangal is a 1986 Indian Malayalam film, directed by P. Ashok Kumar and produced by EVR Enterprises. The film stars Jagathy Sreekumar, Ratheesh, Sukumaran and Balan K. Nair in the lead roles. The film has musical score by Kannur Rajan.

== Cast ==
- Ratheesh as Murali
- Sukumaran as Suresh
- Ravikumar as Johnny
- Balan K. Nair as Mathews
- Jagathy Sreekumar as pimp
- Seema as Sumithra
- Ahalya as Sumathi
- Kuthiravattam Pappu as Pokker
- Bhagyalakshmi
- Prathapachandran as Thampi
- Kaviyoor Ponnamma as Meenakshi
- Santhakumari as Murali's mother
- Bahadoor as Blind man in train

== Soundtrack ==
The music was composed by Kannur Rajan and the lyrics were written by Pappanamkodu Lakshmanan.

No.	Song	Singers	Lyrics	Length (m:ss)
1	"Madanante Kottaaram"	P. Jayachandran, Chorus	Pappanamkodu Lakshmanan	
2	"Manasse Neeyoru"	K. J. Yesudas	Pappanamkodu Lakshmanan	
3	"Paarvanachandrike"	K. J. Yesudas	Pappanamkodu Lakshmanan	
4	"Swapnathil Polum"	S. Janaki, Manoharan	Pappanamkodu Lakshmanan	
