= Idi Muzhakkam =

- Directed by: Sreekumaran Thampi
- Written by: Sreekumaran Thampi
- Screenplay by: Sreekumaran Thampi
- Produced by: Sreekumaran Thampi
- Starring: Jayan; Ratheesh; Shubha; Sukumaran
- Cinematography: Anandakuttan
- Edited by: K. Narayanan
- Music by: Shyam
- Production company: Bhavani Rajeswari
- Distributed by: Bhavani Rajeswari
- Release date: 16 May 1980
- Country: India
- Language: Malayalam

Idi Muzhakkam is a 1980 Indian Malayalam film, directed and produced by Sreekumaran Thampi. The film stars Jayan, Ratheesh, Shubha and Sukumaran in the lead roles. The film has musical score by Shyam. The film was a highly sensational film of the release .

== Cast ==
- Jayan as Bheeman
- Ratheesh as Jose
- Shubha as Chirutha
- Sukumaran as Krishnan Thirumeni
- Roja Ramani as Panchali
- Sukumari as Gouri
- Jagathy Sreekumar as Rajan Unnithan/Thyagacharya
- Manavalan Joseph as Valiya Panikkar
- Balan K. Nair as Govindan Unnithan
- Janardanan
- Kanakadurga as Gayathridevi/Marykutti
- Lalu Alex as Moosa
- N. Govindankutty as Varkey
- Poojappura Ravi as Kochu Panikkar
- John Samual
- Kailas Nath
- Arur Sathyan
- Peyad Vijayan
- Haripad Soman
- N.S Vanjiyoor
- Unnikrishnan
- Paramu
- Krishnan Kutty
- Dhanya
- Sree Santhi
- Mrs. Shoba
- Abdul Muhammed Rasheed

== Soundtrack ==
The music was composed by Shyam and the lyrics were written by Sreekumaran Thampi.

No.	Song	Singers	Lyrics	Length (m:ss)
1	"Amme Maayaamaye"	Vani Jairam, Chorus	Sreekumaran Thampi	
2	"Kaalam Thelinju"	S. Janaki, P. Jayachandran	Sreekumaran Thampi	
3	"Maranju Daivama Vaanil"	K. J. Yesudas	Sreekumaran Thampi	
4	"Odivaa Kaatte"	K. J. Yesudas	Sreekumaran Thampi	

== Box office ==
The film was commercial success.
