= Ottayan =

- Poster
- Directed by: Velayudan Nair
- Written by: Cheri Viswanath
- Screenplay by: Cheri Viswanath
- Produced by: Keshavan Nair
- Starring: Ratheesh; Sathaar; Balan K. Nair; Silk Smitha
- Cinematography: Cross Belt Mani
- Music by: Guna Singh
- Production company: Rose Enterprises
- Distributed by: Rose Enterprises
- Release date: 15 March 1985
- Country: India
- Language: Malayalam
- Budget: ₹1 million
- Box office: ₹1.2 million

Ottayan is a 1985 Indian Malayalam-language film, directed by Crossbelt Mani and produced by N. Kesavan Nair. The film stars Ratheesh, Sathaar, Balan K. Nair, Ramu and Silk Smitha. The film has musical score by Guna Singh.

The film faced negative criticism regarding execution of the story upon its release. A Malayalam softcore pornography film distributed in Kerala's main theatres, it features a rape and revenge storyline where the heroine's blouse is pulled off during a six-minute rape scene and the villain massages her breasts. It cost ₹1 million to make, made ₹1.2 million in two weeks until the censor board banned it.

== Plot ==
It is an action drama based on revenge. Ramesh an orphan is taken in by a poor family, he is an auto-driver. The girl in the family is constantly disturbed by two rich youngsters. Ramesh warns them off. Jilted they kidnap Ramesh's sister and rapes her, his sister stabs Suresh fatally and Suresh strangles her down before dying. Knowing the news, Ramesh comes first to the scene. Police seeing Ramesh at the crime scene arrests him.

Suresh's father is a Mafia boss, he is disturbed by the death of his eldest son Suresh. He wants to take revenge on the whole family and sends Jambu to extradite Ramesh from the prison to punish him personally. Injured, Ramesh escapes en route into the forest and reaches in front of a tribal fight master's hut. The police officer who was in charge gets punishment transfer to the nearby forest, which is operation area of the Mafia boss. Ramesh recuperates and learns tribal fighting style from the master. He falls in love with Rani, his master's daughter.

Jambu, who has to meet requirements of Arabian smugglers from the forest finds it hard with the presence of the police officer. He warns the police officer for raiding and taking over his materials. He later comes in with the Mafia boss' youngest son Sughu and rapes the Police officers wife and hangs her dead body in the forest and leaves the baby in the forest. Ramesh and Rani in their walkabout find the baby and fight off a tiger to save it and decide to look after the child. The Police officer who is in search of his family hears his child crying in the forest and follows it. Seeing Ramesh, he mistakes that Ramesh kidnapped his wife and child. Tribal master resolves the dispute and they look for his wife and find the body. Angered, he and Ramesh storm into the smugglers' camp and kill Sughu. Hearing this news, the Mafia boss is angered and decides to go all out on those who have wronged him. After a long fight the police officer, Ramesh, Rani and Khellappan's ragtag team captures them with accompanying police force.

Ramesh, who finds peace goes back into the jungle with Rani and the tribal master.

== Cast ==
- Ratheesh as Ramesh
- Balan K. Nair as Mafia boss
- Sathaar as Rambo Jambu
- Shivaji as Suresh
- Ramu as Police officer
- Silk Smitha as Rani (credited as Vijayalakshmi)
- Sudheer as Tribal fight master
- Kuthiravattam Pappu as Khellappan

== Soundtrack ==
The music was composed by Guna Singh with lyrics by Bharanikkavu Sivakumar.

No.	Song	Singers	Lyrics	Length (m:ss)
1	"Malarmizhiyude Chantham"	Lathika	Bharanikkavu Sivakumar	
2	"Vaanam Thookum"	P. Jayachandran	Bharanikkavu Sivakumar	
