= Nathi Muthal Nathi Vare =

- Theatrical release poster
- Directed by: Vijayanand
- Screenplay by: Pappanamkodu Lakshmanan
- Produced by: Eeraali
- Starring: Mammootty; M. G. Soman; Ratheesh; Lakshmi; Menaka
- Cinematography: S. Kumar
- Edited by: K. Sankunni
- Music by: Raghu Kumar
- Production company: Drishya
- Distributed by: Drishya
- Release date: 28 July 1983
- Country: India
- Language: Malayalam

Nathi Muthal Nathi Vare is a 1983 Indian Malayalam-language film directed by Vijayanand and produced by Eeraali. The film stars Mammootty, M. G. Soman, Ratheesh, Lakshmi and Menaka in the lead roles. The film has musical score by Raghu Kumar. It is a remake of 1975 Hindi film Deewaar.

== Cast ==
- Mammootty as Raju
- Ratheesh as Ravi
- Captain Raju as Vishnu
- Lakshmi as Naseema
- M. G. Soman as Hamsa
- Balan K. Nair as Chekutty
- Jagathy Sreekumar as Bheeran
- Kaviyoor Ponnamma as Lakshmi
- Jose Prakash as Thampi
- Sankaradi as Velu Mooppan
- Sunanda as Nisha
- Shubha as Jayasree
- Menaka as Thulasi
- Prathapachandran as Sreedhara Menon
- P. K. Abraham as R. C. Nair

== Soundtrack ==
The music was composed by Raghu Kumar and the lyrics were written by Chowalloor Krishnankutty.

No.	Song	Singers	Lyrics	Length (m:ss)
1	"Karalinnum Karalaay" (Bit)	S. Janaki	Chowalloor Krishnankutty	
2	"Maanathum Haalu"	K. J. Yesudas, S. Janaki, Chorus	Chowalloor Krishnankutty	
3	"Pradhamaraavil"		Chowalloor Krishnankutty	
