= Visham =

- Directed by: P. T. Rajan
- Produced by: Thomas Mathew
- Starring: Srividya; Ratheesh; Menaka; M. G. Soman
- Edited by: G.Venkitaraman
- Music by: Raghu Kumar
- Production company: Roopa Cine Arts
- Distributed by: Roopa Cine Arts
- Release date: 4 December 1981
- Country: India
- Language: Malayalam

Visham is a 1981 Indian Malayalam film, directed by P. T. Rajan and produced by Thomas Mathew. The film stars Srividya, Ratheesh, Menaka and MG Soman in the lead roles. The film has musical score by Raghu Kumar.

== Cast ==
- Srividya as Sharada
- Ratheesh as Babu
- Menaka as Shoba
- M. G. Soman as SI Madhu
- K. P. Ummer as Gopinathan
- Kundara Johnny as Johnny
- Paravoor Bharathan as Kurup
- C. I. Paul as K. R. K. Menon
- Jagathy Sreekumar as Rajan
- Jaffer Khan as Rocky (Dubbed by Thodupuzha Radhakrishnan)
- Punnapra Appachan
- Indrapani
- Mannar Radha
- Sukumar Pilla
- Balan Njarakkal
- Shahul Kottaym
- Jose Kottaram
- Shaji
- Raju Puthanagadi
- George
- Beena Sabu as Rathi
- Manavalan Joseph as Raman Nair

== Soundtrack ==
The music was composed by Raghu Kumar and the lyrics were written by Poovachal Khader and Alappuzha Rajasekharan Nair.

No.	Song	Singers	Lyrics	Length (m:ss)
1	"En Nayanangal"	S. Janaki	Poovachal Khader, Alappuzha Rajasekharan Nair	
2	"Ninneyen Swanthamaakkum Njaan"	K. J. Yesudas	Poovachal Khader, Alappuzha Rajasekharan Nair	
3	"Nirangal Ezhu Nirangal"	S. Janaki, Vani Jairam	Poovachal Khader, Alappuzha Rajasekharan Nair	
4	"Swapnam Kaanum Praayam"	S. Janaki, Vani Jairam	Poovachal Khader, Alappuzha Rajasekharan Nair	
5	"Ulsaaha Malsaram Kondaadunnu"	K. J. Yesudas, Kalyani Menon	Poovachal Khader, Alappuzha Rajasekharan Nair	
