= Revenge (1985 film) =

- Directed by: Crossbelt Mani
- Produced by: Ratheesh; Sathar
- Starring: Ratheesh; Sathaar; Anuradha; Balan K. Nair
- Cinematography: Cross Belt Mani
- Edited by: Chakrapani
- Music by: Guna Singh
- Production company: Jaid Film
- Distributed by: Jaid Film
- Release date: 7 December 1985
- Country: India
- Language: Malayalam

Revenge is a 1985 Indian film, in the Malayalam language, directed by Crossbelt Mani and produced by Ratheesh and Sathar. The film stars Ratheesh, Sathaar, Anuradha and Balan K. Nair in the lead roles. The film has musical score by Guna Singh.

== Cast ==
- Ratheesh as Johnny
- Sathaar as William
- Anuradha as Susan
- Balan K. Nair
- Jagathi Sreekumar as Head constable Babu
- Ramu
- Silk Smitha as Geetha

== Soundtrack ==
The music was composed by Guna Singh and the lyrics were written by Mankombu Gopalakrishnan.

No.	Song	Singers	Lyrics	Length (m:ss)
1	"Sringaaram Poompeeli Neerkkum"	K. J. Yesudas	Mankombu Gopalakrishnan	
2	"Sukham Sukham"	Lathika	Mankombu Gopalakrishnan	
