= Ammakkorumma =

- Directed by: Sreekumaran Thampi
- Written by: Sreekumaran Thampi
- Produced by: Sreekumaran Thampi, Bhavani Rajeswari Cambines.
- Starring: Ratheesh; Jagathy Sreekumar; Zarina Wahab
- Edited by: V. P. Krishnan
- Music by: Shyam
- Release date: 25 December 1981
- Country: India
- Language: Malayalam

Ammakkorumma (1981) is an Indian film in the Malayalam language directed by Sreekumaran Thampi, starring Ratheesh, Jagathy Sreekumar, Zarina Wahab and Rajakumaran Thampi, Thampi's son. The Malayalam title literally means A Kiss for Mother.

== Plot synopsis ==
Varghese, an employee in Vijayan's factory, passes away due to an ailment. When Vijayan goes to attend the funeral rites of Varghese, he finds that Varghese's wife is none other than his old lover.

== Cast ==
- Ratheesh as Vijayan
- Zarina Wahab as Sindhu
- Rajakumaran Thampi as Rajumon
- Jagathy Sreekumar as IPS officer Bhadran
- Bhagyalakshmi as Radhika
- Kalarenjini as Sherly
- T. R. Omana
- Hari as Varghese
- Radhadevi
- Poojappura Ravi
- Vijayaraghavan as actor Gopakumar
- Aruna Irani as bar dancer

== Soundtrack ==
| Song | Playback | Lyrics | Duration |
|---|---|---|---|
| Adimudi poothu ninnu.. | K. J. Yesudas | Sreekumaran Thampi | 4:33 |
| Makane vaa pon makane vaa.. | S. Janaki | Sreekumaran Thampi | 4:27 |
| Water water.. | Anitha | Sreekumaran Thampi | 3:35 |
| Ormavacha Naal muthal.. | K. J. Yesudas, S. Janaki | Sreekumaran Thampi | 4:37 |
