= Saandham Bheekaram =

- Directed by: Rajasenan
- Written by: Baton Bose; Velliman Vijayan (dialogues)
- Screenplay by: Velliman Vijayan
- Produced by: Mancheri Chandran
- Starring: Ratheesh, Shankar, Seema, Sukumari, Jagathy Sreekumar, T. G. Ravi, Capatain Raju
- Cinematography: V. Karunakaran
- Edited by: G. Murali
- Music by: Shyam
- Production company: The Star Cine Arts
- Distributed by: The Star Cine Arts
- Release date: 4 October 1985
- Country: India
- Language: Malayalam

Saandham Bheekaram is a 1985 Indian Malayalam film, directed by Rajasenan and produced by Mancheri Chandran. The film stars Ratheesh, Shankar, Seema, T. G. Ravi, Captain Raju, Jagathy Sreekumar, Mala Aravindan and Sukumari in the main roles. The film has musical score by Shyam.

== Cast ==
- Ratheesh
- Shanavas
- Shankar
- Captain Raju
- T. G. Ravi
- Mala Aravindan
- Bobby Kottarakkara
- Seema
- K. R. Savithri
- Ramyasree
- Sabitha Anand
- Saleema
- Sukumari

== Soundtrack ==
The music was composed by Shyam and the lyrics were written by Poovachal Khader.

| No. | Song | Singers | Lyrics | Length (m:ss) |
|---|---|---|---|---|
| 1 | "Etho Swaram Moolunnu" | P. Susheela | Poovachal Khader | |
| 2 | "Thaalam Nenjil Thaalam" | Unni Menon, Chorus, Lathika | Poovachal Khader | |
