= Kottum Kuravayum =

- Poster
- Directed by: Alleppey Ashraf
- Written by: Eerali; Salim Cherthala (dialogues)
- Screenplay by: Salim Cherthala and Ak Lohithadas
- Produced by: Eeraali
- Starring: Sukumari; Mammootty; Jagathy Sreekumar; Innocent
- Cinematography: Ayyappan
- Edited by: L. Bhoominathan
- Music by: Raghu Kumar
- Production company: Surabhi
- Distributed by: Surabhi
- Release date: 24 January 1987
- Country: India
- Language: Malayalam

Kottum Kuravayum is a 1987 Indian Malayalam film, directed by Alleppey Ashraf and produced by Eeraali. The film stars Sukumari, Mammootty, Jagathy Sreekumar and Innocent in the lead roles. The film has musical score by Raghu Kumar.

== Cast ==
- Sukumari
- Mammootty
- Jagathy Sreekumar
- Innocent
- Mukesh
- Urvashi
- Menaka
- Ratheesh
- Sreenivasan
- Bobby Kottarakkara
- Kaduvakulam Antony
- Mala Aravindan
- Shari
- T. G. Ravi
- Gorilla Unni
- Alex Mathew

== Soundtrack ==
The music was composed by Raghu Kumar and the lyrics were written by Panthalam Sudhakaran.

No.	Song	Singers	Lyrics	Length (m:ss)
1	"Kilimakal Kavithakal" (Neehaaramay)	Vani Jairam, Unni Menon	Panthalam Sudhakaran	
