= Innalenkil Nale =

- Promotional Poster
- Directed by: I. V. Sasi
- Written by: T. Damodaran
- Screenplay by: T. Damodaran
- Produced by: N. G. John
- Starring: Mammootty; Ratheesh; Unnimary; Rajkumar
- Cinematography: Ramachandra Babu
- Edited by: K. Narayanan
- Music by: Shyam
- Production company: Geo Movies
- Distributed by: Geo Movies
- Release date: 25 December 1982
- Country: India
- Language: Malayalam

Innalenkil Nale (transl. If not today, tomorrow) is a 1982 Indian Malayalam-language film, directed by I. V. Sasi and produced by N. G. John. The film stars Mammootty, Ratheesh, Unnimary and Rajkumar. The film has musical score by Shyam.

== Cast ==
- Mammootty as Rahim
- Seema as Vimala
- Unnimary as Susheela
- Balan K. Nair as Gopalan Master
- Ratheesh as Vijayan
- Rajkumar as Raghu
- Raveendran as Ravi
- Lalu Alex as Madhu
- Surekha as Ayisha Bheevi
- T. G. Ravi as Adv. Mathew Abraham
- Anuradha as Fabiya
- Anjali Naidu as Sainaba
- Thrissur Elsy as Molly Mathew Abraham
- Swapna as Vidhu
- Santhakumari as Radha
- Vanitha Krishnachandran as Rekha
- Raghavan as Advocate
- Sankaradi as Kannan
- Sathyakala as Radha
- Vincent as Bichu Koya
- Sukumari
- Kuthiravattam Pappu
- Prathapachandran
- P.K.Abraham as Advocate

== Plot ==
The film has a series of threads progressing. The film commences in a hospital, where Susheela is awaiting her second delivery. Much to the disappointment of her husband Madhu and his family, she delivers another daughter. Raju leaves hospital without even giving a glance at the newborn.

The newly transferred police inspector (portrayed by Ratheesh) reaches the place midnight and boards a taxi, which is driven by Rahim. Rahim drops him at the place he wanted, however a small debate begins when Rahim demands 25 Rs when the meter charge displays 9 Rs 40 paise, as it is 2 a.m. As the house maids inform Rahim that he is the commissioner, Rahim would compromises with any amount. However, the inspector gives him the money he had asked for.

Susheela is the second daughter in a family of four daughters and a son. The eldest daughter Vimala is still unmarried, as she had been cheated by her lover. After completing LLB, she starts practising under an Advocate. The third daughter is a college student having an affair. While the fourth is a student in youth. The son demands for more money from his father for his marriage expenses, and finally, an irritated father handles the gold chain of Rekha to him.

The police inspector, being a family friend, pays a visit to Vimala's house and gets surprised on hearing that she is still single.

Rahim drops his owner's wife and sister Ayisha for a festival purchase to a textile shop. While her sister-in-law goes to another section for the purchase, Ayisha purchases a shirt. After the purchase Rahim drops them back to their house.

Susheela has a tough job as a housewife doing all the work in her husband's house - looking after the two daughters, handling kitchen duties by making dishes of each of their choice, washing clothes including that of her husband's brother. Once the younger kid was affected with fever, she had placed her younger kid to sleep in the cot. She was waiting for Madhu to reach home, so as to take dinner with him. However Madhu comes home after taking dinner and was drunk. He goes to bed, and on seeing the younger kid on bed, asks Susheela to place her on the mat on the ground. Being affected with fever, the kid was crying throughout the night and Madhu asks Susheela to take the kid away from the room. Susheela takes the kid out, and somehow makes her asleep and takes her back to the mat. By that time it was early morning and Madhu's father asks for the morning tea. So she goes straight to kitchen to start the regular household activities.

Ayisha is a widow. She was married to a very old man in a very younger age. On seeing her husband's face for the first time, she was frightened, and so she left her husband's house. After a few days, they got a telegram that he is no more. Ayisha's brother and wife plot to get her share of property. They plan to get her signature on the document by making her believe that the agreement was to make her partner in her brother's business. Ayisha handles the newly bought shirt to Rahim (their driver) as a festival gift.

Madhu slaps and shouts at his wife for taking money from his purse without asking him. Susheela had taken money in the morning for buying tonic (medicine) for her younger daughter who was ill. Madhu throws and breaks the medicine bottle and shouts heavily at her. This irritates Madhu's family and his father and brother asks them to leave the house, so that they could live peacefully there.

Vimala's brother marries Vidhu. Vidhu's parents visit their house, and they take them to their estate. Vidhu's mother trickily makes Vidhu's husband agree that he leave his family and stay with them.

While returning from the job one night Rahim finds her sister weeping. She tells her that she got a letter from someone named Purushotham. While tracing the return address in the letter Rahim finds him in a hotel. Rahim beats Purushotham. However, only after he is arrested does he discover that Puroshotham is a police constable.

Madhu, Susheela and their kids move to a new house. Susheela and kids wait for Madhu to take the dinner. However, Madhu comes home with some of his friends and asks her to cook meat and fish which he had bought. They start consuming liquor and make noise, while Susheela cooks the meat and fish. In the meanwhile, the hungry children fell asleep. Later, Susheela wakes up to find that the entire place is made dirty by Madhu and his friends.

Rahim arranges her sisters wedding with a textile salesman, who has many demands including a rubber bed, a radio, etc. Rahim asks the money lent to Vimala's father during the marriage of his son; so as to meet the demands of his would-be brother-in-law. Vimala's father goes to his son, however his son returns him empty handed. Ayisha hands her necklace to Rahim's sister for her marriage.

Susheela returns to her house with the younger child weeping. She tells Vimala that she saw her husband with another lady in the bedroom, so she had to leave the house. However her elder daughter is still with Madhu. To get the daughter, Susheela's father pays a visit to Madhu's house. However Madhu treats him very badly and drags away the elder daughter who desperately wanted to go with her grandfather to meet her mother. On reaching home, he gets paralysis and finally become bed ridden.

Aiysha's brother gets the registrar to their home to get her signature. While the registrar asks Aiysha whether she knows the contents in the document, she nods that she is aware of it. However, when registrar asks for a witness, Aiysha's brother calls Rahim who was cleaning the car there. Rahim insists on knowing the contents of the document before signing it. Then the registrar mentions that it is for transferring the ownership of all Aiysha's properties to her brother. On hearing this, Aiysha is surprised and she tells that she is not willing to sign the document, and that she was falsely told that the document was for a business partnership. Aiysha's brother is angered, and so plans to trap Rahim. His wife tells him that Aiysha had given her ornaments to Rahim's sister.

Susheela goes to Madhu's house to find her elder daughter locked in it in a very poor condition. She breaks open the door lock and takes her daughter away.

In the meanwhile Vimala gets a divorce case from the wife of the police inspector. She tells that her husband is still bothered about his ex-lover and pays less attention to her. Vimala talks with the inspector and tells him that his current position is not matching her current job as a lawyer. This makes him go back to his wife and they stay happy.

Madhu comes to Susheela's house to take the daughter. However, she does not give her daughter. While Madhu tries to take the child forcefully, their neighbour Rahim interferes and Madhu had to take leave.

Aiysha's brother files a complaint about a gold chain missing from their house and Police traces that chain from Rahim's house. Rahim is taken into police custody and is brutally beaten up. However he did not admit it. Aiysha comes to police station and tells that it was her chain and she had given it as a gift to Rahim's sister for her marriage. On hearing this, the police inspector feels pity and frees Rahim.

Susheela gets a divorce notice from her husband, demanding the custody of the children, too.

In the meantime Vimala's brother's life also becomes miserable. They move to another house and he had to carry the burden of his wife's parents too, which leads to some difference between them.

Rahim sends some religious members to ask Aiysha's hand in marriage, to which Aiysha's brother behaves harshly. Rahim comes in and takes Aiysha with him. Though her brother tries to block her, she leaves with Rahim.

Being repeatedly frightened by bad dreams of Madhu taking away the kids, Susheela plans to commit suicide and jumps into a river with her kids. Though Susheela is rescued, her children get drowned and killed.

The film ends with Vimala pleading in the court to hang Susheela, so that she will no longer be hunted and also for the crime she has committed.

== Soundtrack ==
The music was composed by Shyam and the lyrics were written by Yusufali Kechery.

No.	Song	Singers	Lyrics	Length (m:ss)
1	"Chundo Chendo"	K. J. Yesudas	Yusufali Kechery	
2	"Dukhathin Kaippillaathe"	K. J. Yesudas, P. Jayachandran, Zero Babu	Yusufali Kechery	
3	"Karalithiletho Kilipaadi"	K. J. Yesudas, S. Janaki	Yusufali Kechery	
