= Anubhavangale Nanni =

1979 film

- Directed by: I. V. Sasi
- Written by: Kaloor Dennis; S. L. Puram Sadanandan (dialogues)
- Starring: Madhu; Jayabharathi; Sankaradi; Balan K. Nair
- Music by: G. Devarajan
- Production company: Poornasree Arts
- Distributed by: Poornasree Arts
- Release date: 25 May 1979
- Country: India
- Language: Malayalam

Anubhavangale Nanni is a 1979 Indian Malayalam-language film, directed by I. V. Sasi. The film stars Madhu, Jayabharathi, Sankaradi and Balan K. Nair in the lead roles. G. Devarajan composed the music.

== Cast ==
- Madhu
- M. G. Soman
- Jayabharathi
- Seema
- Sankaradi
- Balan K. Nair
- Cochin Haneefa
- K. P. A. C. Lalitha
- Kuthiravattam Pappu
- Kottayam Santha
- Meena

== Soundtrack ==
The music was composed by G. Devarajan and the lyrics were written by Yusufali Kechery and R. K. Damodaran.

No.	Song	Singers	Lyrics	Length (m:ss)
1	"Amrithavaahini"	K. J. Yesudas, P. Madhuri	Yusufali Kechery	
2	"Anubhavangale Nandi"	K. J. Yesudas	Yusufali Kechery	
3	"Devante Kovilil"	P. Susheela, P. Madhuri	R. K. Damodaran	
4	"Maanodum Mala"	Karthikeyan, Thoppil Anto	Yusufali Kechery	
