= Karinagam =

- Directed by: K. S. Gopalakrishnan
- Written by: Jagathy N. K. Achari
- Screenplay by: Jagathy N. K. Achari
- Starring: Ratheesh; Anuradha; Balan K. Nair; Bheeman Raghu
- Edited by: A. Sukumaran
- Music by: A. T. Ummer
- Production company: Vinod Arts
- Distributed by: Vinod Arts
- Release date: 25 June 1986
- Country: India
- Language: Malayalam

Karinagam is a 1986 Indian Malayalam film, directed by K. S. Gopalakrishnan. The film stars Ratheesh, Anuradha, Balan K. Nair and Bheeman Raghu in the lead roles. The film has a musical score by A. T. Ummer.

The Malayalam softcore porn film features several sex scenes and nudity that were not shown to the censor board which later banned the film.

== Cast ==
- Ratheesh
- Anuradha
- Balan K. Nair
- Bheeman Raghu
- Ranipadmini
- T. G. Ravi
- Raj Kumar
- Jagathy sreekumar
- Kuthiravattam Pappu

== Soundtrack ==
The music was composed by A. T. Ummer and the lyrics were written by Poovachal Khader.

No.	Song	Singers	Lyrics	Length (m:ss)
1	"Kulirunnen Meyyaake"	K. S. Chithra	Poovachal Khader	
2	"Lajjaalolayayi"	K. J. Yesudas	Poovachal Khader	
3	"Mohamaakum Naagangal"	K. S. Chithra, Krishnachandran	Poovachal Khader	
