= Niyamam Enthucheyyum =

- Promotional Poster
- Directed by: Arun
- Produced by: Navasakthi Arts
- Starring: Shankar; Ratheesh; Nalini; Ramu
- Music by: Johnson
- Release date: 16 March 1990
- Country: India
- Language: Malayalam

Niyamam Enthucheyyum is a 1990 Indian Malayalam-language film directed by Arun, starring Shankar.

== Cast ==
- Shankar
- Ratheesh as S.I.
- Adoor Bhasi
- Nalini
- Shanavas as Prakash
- Prameela as Prameela
- Kuthiravattam Pappu
- Kaduvakulam Antony
- Prathapachandran as Kaimal
- Lalithasree
- Priya as Priya
- Kuyili
- Ramu
- T. G. Ravi as Sathyapal
