= Arabikkadal =

1983 film by J. Sasikumar

- Poster
- Directed by: J. Sasikumar
- Screenplay by: Vijayan Karote
- Story by: J. Sasikumar
- Produced by: Alambathara Divakaran
- Starring: Madhu; Srividya; Mohanlal; Ratheesh
- Cinematography: R. R. Rajkumar
- Edited by: K. Sankunni
- Music by: M. K. Arjunan
- Production company: Sabari International
- Distributed by: Vijaya Movies
- Release date: 8 July 1983
- Country: India
- Language: Malayalam

Arabikkadal (transl. Arabian Sea) is a 1983 Indian Malayalam-language film directed by J. Sasikumar and written by Vijayan Karote from a story by Sasikumar. The film stars Madhu, Srividya, Mohanlal and Ratheesh in major roles. The film features music composed by M. K. Arjunan.

== Cast ==
- Madhu
- Srividya
- Mohanlal
- Ratheesh
- Shubha
- Menaka
- Nellikode Bhaskaran

== Soundtrack ==
The music was composed by M. K. Arjunan and the lyrics were written by Poovachal Khader.

No.	Song	Singers	Lyrics	Length (m:ss)
1	"Arabikadale Nee Saakshi"	K. J. Yesudas	Poovachal Khader	
2	"Kaamuki Njaan"	Vani Jairam	Poovachal Khader	
3	"Kadalamme Thiraveeshi"	P. Jayachandran, Chorus	Poovachal Khader	
4	"Panchaara Manalil"	K. J. Yesudas, Chorus	Poovachal Khader	
