= Shathru (1985 film) =

- Directed by: T. S. Mohan
- Starring: Ratheesh; Anuradha; Bheeman Raghu; Kuthiravattam Pappu
- Cinematography: Ramakrishnan
- Edited by: K. Rajagopal
- Music by: A. T. Ummer
- Production company: Karthikeya Films
- Distributed by: Karthikeya Films
- Release date: 15 November 1985
- Country: India
- Language: Malayalam

Shathru is a 1985 Indian Malayalam film, directed by T. S. Mohan. The film stars Ratheesh, Anuradha, Bheeman Raghu and Kuthiravattam Pappu in the lead roles. The film has musical score by A. T. Ummer.

== Cast ==
- Ratheesh as Sudhindran
- Anuradha as Savithri Sankar
- Bheeman Raghu as Johnny
- Kuthiravattam Pappu as Kurup
- Madhuri
- Unnimary as Cicily
- Balan K. Nair as U. P. Menon
- Valsala Menon
- Mala Aravindan as Thamarakshan/Kottada Vasu
- Babu Antony as Man in the crowd
- Devan as Rajasekharan
- Sathaar as Ramakrishnan
- Madhuri as Suma

== Soundtrack ==
The music was composed by A. T. Ummer and the lyrics were written by Poovachal Khader.

No.	Song	Singers	Lyrics	Length (m:ss)
1	"Geethe Ninakku"	K. P. Brahmanandan, Kalyani Menon	Poovachal Khader	
2	"Raaga Tharalitham En Hridayam"	K. S. Chithra	Poovachal Khader	
3	"Varadayaay Vaazhunna"	K. J. Yesudas, K. S. Chithra	Poovachal Khader	
