= Onnu Randu Moonnu =

- Directed by: Rajasenan
- Written by: Rajasenan; Joseph Vattoli (dialogues)
- Screenplay by: Rajasenan
- Produced by: P. Jayaraman
- Starring: Urvashi; Ratheesh; Captain Raju; Unnimary
- Cinematography: V. Karunakaran
- Edited by: G. Murali
- Music by: Rajasenan
- Production company: Sree Balaji Combines
- Distributed by: Sree Balaji Combines
- Release date: 20 July 1986
- Country: India
- Language: Malayalam

Onnu Randu Moonnu is a 1986 Indian Malayalam-language film, directed by Rajasenan and produced by P. Jayaraman. The film stars Urvashi, Ratheesh, Captain Raju and Unnimary in the lead roles. The film has musical score by Rajasenan.

== Cast ==
- Urvashi
- Ratheesh
- Captain Raju
- Unnimary
- Babitha Justin
- Bobby Kottarakkara
- Chithra
- Kundara Johnny
- Kaduvakulam Antony
- Karamana Janardanan Nair
- Kuthiravattam Pappu
- Meena
- Ramu
- Ramyasree
- Sindhu
- T. G. Ravi
- Babu Antony
- Valsala Menon

== Soundtrack ==
The music was composed by Rajasenan with lyrics by Poovachal Khader.

No.	Song	Singers	Lyrics	Length (m:ss)
1	"Ente Manassoru"	K. S. Chithra	Poovachal Khader	
2	"Paadum Oru Kiliyaay"	K. J. Yesudas, K. S. Chithra	Poovachal Khader	
