= Angachamayam =

- Directed by: Rajaji Babu
- Written by: Babu Jose; Mankombu Gopalakrishnan (dialogues)
- Screenplay by: Rajaji Babu
- Produced by: Babu Jose
- Starring: Prem Nazir; Swapna; Jose; T. R. Omana
- Cinematography: Lekshman Gore
- Edited by: K. Sankunni
- Music by: G. Devarajan
- Production company: Jose International
- Distributed by: Jose International
- Release date: 9 July 1982
- Country: India
- Language: Malayalam

Angachamayam is a 1982 Indian Malayalam film, directed by Rajaji Babu and produced by Babu Jose. The film stars Prem Nazir, Swapna, Jose and T. R. Omana in the lead roles. The film has musical score by G. Devarajan.

== Cast ==
- Prem Nazir as Public Prosecutor Jayadevan
- Swapna as Malla
- Jose
- T. R. Omana as Jayadevan's Mother
- Prathapachandran as Tribal Leader
- Sathaar as Baby
- Anjali Naidu as Gayathri
- Balan K. Nair as Robert
- Jaffer Khan as Chandrahassan
- Ravikumar as Forest Officer
- Kundara Johny as Sony
- Hari
- Paul Vengola
- Jaggu
- Aravindhakshan
- Vasu
- Rajashekaran
- Jayshree T.
- Baby Rajitha
- Preethi
- Saha
- Velayudhan
- Rama chandran
- Prem Shankar

== Soundtrack ==
The music was composed by G. Devarajan and the lyrics were written by Mankombu Gopalakrishnan.

No.	Song	Singers	Lyrics	Length (m:ss)
1	"Ilam Pennin"	P. Jayachandran	Mankombu Gopalakrishnan	
2	"Manjurukum"	K. J. Yesudas	Mankombu Gopalakrishnan	
3	"Then Churathi"	P. Madhuri	Mankombu Gopalakrishnan	
