= Theekattu =

- Directed by: Joseph Vattoli
- Written by: Reji George; Joseph Vattoli (dialogues)
- Screenplay by: Joseph Vattoli
- Starring: Jagathy Sreekumar; Ratheesh; Rohini; Captain Raju
- Cinematography: Melly Dayalan
- Edited by: K. S. Sivachandran
- Music by: Murali Sithara
- Production company: Aji Arts
- Distributed by: Aji Arts
- Release date: 21 August 1987
- Country: India
- Language: Malayalam

Theekattu is a 1987 Indian Malayalam film, directed by Joseph Vattoli. The film stars Jagathy Sreekumar, Ratheesh, Rohini and Captain Raju in the lead roles. The film has musical score by Murali Sithara.

== Cast ==
- Jagathy Sreekumar as Kachan Kurichi
- Ratheesh as Jayadevan
- Jayalalita as Sreedevi
- Rohini as Mercy
- Captain Raju as Basheer
- T. G. Ravi as Ramadas
- Preetha A as Ramadas's daughter
- Santhakumari as Jayadevan's mother
- Jagannatha Varma as Radha's father
- Kundara Johnny as James
- Bobby Kottarakkara as Susheela
- Saudamini as Chandrika
- Vettoor Purushan as Ramanan

== Soundtrack ==
The music was composed by Murali Sithara and the lyrics were written by Kollam Vidyadharan.

No.	Song	Singers	Lyrics	Length (m:ss)
1	"Oru Kodi Swapnangalaal"	K. J. Yesudas	Kollam Vidyadharan	
2	"Yat Sankalpam"	K. S. Chithra	Kollam Vidyadharan	
