= Annoru Ravil =

1986 film directed by M. R. Joseph

- Directed by: M. R. Joseph
- Written by: M. R. Joseph
- Produced by: M. R. Joseph
- Starring: Jagathy Sreekumar; Ratheesh; Nahas; Sukumaran
- Cinematography: Padma Kumar
- Edited by: A. Sukumaran
- Music by: Raveendran
- Production company: Yogya Veettil Films
- Distributed by: Yogya Veettil Films
- Release date: 10 January 1986
- Country: India
- Language: Malayalam

Annoru Ravil is a 1986 Indian Malayalam-language film directed and produced by M. R. Joseph. The film stars Jagathy Sreekumar, Ratheesh, Nahas and Sukumaran in the lead roles. The film has musical score by Raveendran.

== Cast ==
- Jagathy Sreekumar as Vicky
- Ratheesh as Venu
- Nahas
- Sukumaran as Indrajith
- Anuradha
- Chithra
- Devisree
- Kuthiravattam Pappu as Antony Nair
- Lalithasree
- Ranipadmini
- Silk Smitha
- T. G. Ravi
- Usha
- Thodupuzha Radhakrishnan

== Soundtrack ==
The music was composed by Raveendran and the lyrics were written by Mankombu Gopalakrishnan.

No.	Song	Singers	Lyrics	Length (m:ss)
1	"My name is Mikki"	K. S. Chithra, Krishnachandran	Mankombu Gopalakrishnan	
2	"Pallimanjalerivanna"	K. J. Yesudas	Mankombu Gopalakrishnan	
3	"Romapuriyle"	Krishnachandran	Mankombu Gopalakrishnan	
