= Chambalkadu =

Champalakadu
- Directed by: K. G. Rajasekharan
- Written by: Kollam Gopi
- Screenplay by: Kollam Gopi
- Starring: Prem Nazir; Balan K. Nair; Mammootty; Ratheesh; K. P. Ummer; Swapna; Jayamalini
- Cinematography: C. Ramachandra Menon
- Edited by: V. P. Krishnan
- Music by: M. K. Arjunan
- Production company: NK Productions
- Distributed by: NK Productions
- Release date: 2 June 1982
- Country: India
- Language: Malayalam

Champalakadu is a 1982 Indian Malayalam film, directed by K. G. Rajasekharan. The film stars Prem Nazir, Balan K. Nair, Mammootty, Ratheesh and Swapna in the lead roles. The film has musical score by M. K. Arjunan.

== Cast ==
- Prem Nazir
- Balan K. Nair
- K. P. Ummer
- Mammootty
- Ratheesh
- Swapna
- Jayamalini
- P. R. Varalakshmi

== Soundtrack ==
The music was composed by M. K. Arjunan and the lyrics were written by Kollam Gopi.

No.	Song	Singers	Lyrics	Length (m:ss)
1	"Krishna Krishna"	Ambili	Kollam Gopi	
2	"Neerada Shyaamala Komala"	K. J. Yesudas	Kollam Gopi	
3	"Padmaraagaveenayithu Meetti Aaduvaan"	Jency	Kollam Gopi	
4	"Puthiya Sooryanudichu"	Chorus, Jency	Kollam Gopi	
