= Aattuvanchi Ulanjappol =

- Directed by: Bhadran
- Written by: Chellamma Joseph; K. T. Muhammad (dialogues)
- Screenplay by: K. T. Muhammad
- Produced by: N. G. John
- Starring: Lakshmi; Madhu; Mammootty; Ratheesh
- Cinematography: Melli Irani
- Edited by: G. Venkittaraman
- Music by: Shyam
- Production company: Geo Movies
- Distributed by: Geo Movies
- Release date: 15 June 1984
- Country: India
- Language: Malayalam

Aattuvanchi Ulanjappol is a 1984 Indian Malayalam film, directed by Bhadran and produced by N. G. John. The film stars Lakshmi, Madhu, Mammootty and Ratheesh in the lead roles. The film has musical score by Shyam.

== Cast ==
- Lakshmi as Prameela
- Madhu as Advocate Viswanathan
- Mammootty as Balachandran
- Ratheesh as Murali
- Sathyakala as Ammini, Balu's wife
- Surekha as Hema
- Thilakan as Prameela's Father
- Ashokan as Janardhanan, Prameela's brother
- Kottayam Santha as Balachandran's mother
- Baiju
- Manavalan Joseph
- Sankaradi as Bank Manager
- T. R. Omana as Murali's mother
- Beena
- Lalithasree
- P. R. Menon
- Santhakumari as Prameela's mother
- T. G. Ravi Hema's husband
- Jolly Abraham as Party singer (Guest Appearance)

== Soundtrack ==
The music was composed by Shyam and the lyrics were written by Puthiyankam Murali.

No.	Song	Singers	Lyrics	Length (m:ss)
1	"Aaromale Nilaavil Nee Padoo"	K. J. Yesudas	Puthiyankam Murali	
2	"Indraneela"	K. J. Yesudas	Puthiyankam Murali	
