= Kulambadikal =

- Directed by: Crossbelt Mani
- Written by: Cheri Viswanath
- Screenplay by: Cheri Viswanath
- Starring: Jagathy Sreekumar; Ashwathy; Ratheesh; Menaka
- Cinematography: Cross Belt Mani
- Edited by: V. Chakrapaani
- Music by: Guna Singh
- Production company: MM Movie Productions
- Distributed by: MM Movie Productions
- Release date: 4 October 1986
- Country: India
- Language: Malayalam

Kulambadikal is a 1986 Indian Malayalam film, directed by Crossbelt Mani. The film stars Jagathy Sreekumar, Ashwathy, Ratheesh and Menaka in the lead roles. The film has musical score by Guna Singh.

== Cast ==
- Jagathy Sreekumar
- Ashwathy
- Ratheesh
- Menaka
- Anuradha
- Bahadoor
- Balan K. Nair
- G. K. Pillai
- Kaduvakulam Antony
- Kuthiravattam Pappu
- Nellikode Bhaskaran
- Ramu
- Valsala Menon

== Soundtrack ==
The music was composed by Guna Singh and the lyrics were written by Bharanikkavu Sivakumar.

No.	Song	Singers	Lyrics	Length (m:ss)
1	"Aadaanaavaathe"	Lathika	Bharanikkavu Sivakumar	
2	"Malar Thookunnu"	Lathika	Bharanikkavu Sivakumar	
3	"Nilaavala Thalirkkudil"	Krishnachandran, Lathika	Bharanikkavu Sivakumar	
