= Sannaham =

- Directed by: Jose Kallen
- Written by: Thomas Vadakkel
- Screenplay by: M. R. Jose
- Produced by: Aravind K. Varma
- Starring: Prem Nazir; Ratheesh; Balan K Nair; Madhuri
- Cinematography: N. Karthikeyan
- Edited by: A Sukumaran
- Music by: Johnson
- Production company: Salkkala Films
- Distributed by: Salkkala Films
- Release date: 17 March 1985
- Country: India
- Language: Malayalam

Sannaham is a 1985 Indian Malayalam film, directed by Jose Kallen and produced by Aravind K. Varma. The film stars Prem Nazir, Ratheesh, Balan K. Nair and Madhuri in the lead roles. The film has a musical score by Johnson.

== Cast ==
- Prem Nazir as Varma
- Ratheesh as Ramesh
- Balan K. Nair as Prathapan
- Madhuri as Rekha
- Sumithra as Shaila
- T. G. Ravi as Kaimal
- Mala Aravindan as Neelakandan
- Shivaji as Raghavan
- Bobby Kottarakkara as Gopalakrishnan
- Kuthiravattom Pappu as
- Bheeman Raghu as Raghu
- Rani Padmini as Rani
- K. R. Savithri as Gouriyamma
- Jose Kottaram
- Gomathi
- Babu
- Sreekumar
- Sivan
- Manohari
- Aravind K. Varma

== Soundtrack ==
The music was composed by Johnson and the lyrics were written by Devadas.

No.	Song	Singers	Lyrics	Length (m:ss)
1	"Innale Njan"	K. J. Yesudas	Devadas	
2	"Manappullikkaavile"	K. J. Yesudas	Devadas	
