= Abkari =

- Poster designed by P. N. Menon
- Directed by: I. V. Sasi
- Written by: T. Damodaran
- Produced by: George Mathew
- Starring: Mammootty; Ratheesh; T. G. Ravi; Thiagarajan; Parvathy; Urvashi; Jalaja
- Cinematography: Jayaram
- Edited by: K. Narayanan
- Distributed by: Liberty Release
- Release date: 14 April 1988
- Country: India
- Language: Malayalam

Abkari is a 1988 Malayalam movie starring Mammootty and Ratheesh in the title roles. It was written by T. Damodaran and was directed by I. V. Sasi.

== Plot ==
Vasu and Chacko are working as drivers and low ranking workers for the Abkari contractor Sreekandan. Sreekandan is heavily involved in the smuggling of liquor from the neighbouring state of Tamil Nadu in order to increase the already high profits in his business. Chacko once makes an incorrect move to seduce the wife of Sreekandan, hoping that she is just waiting for any new man to come into her love life. But she only wanted to have an affair with Vasu. Sreekandan learns of this, and Chacko is beaten black and blue and expelled from the organisation.

For some time the jobless youngsters try illegal brewing of hooch. But the Excise soon rounds them up. Kaimal, an Excise officer who has a past enmity with Sreekandan, meets up with the two young men. He encourages them to join the liquor trade as Abkaris. Kaimal takes the responsibility of helping them, even to generate the initial capital. Both Vasu and Chacko forms up a company "VASCO" and participates in the first Abkari range auction. Sreekandan who used to regularly win at the auction is defeated.

The growth of VASCO is phenomenal and with good support from Excise officials the business is flourishing. Vasu and Chacko, who once lived in a slum, move into palatial bungalows and now live a life of luxury. Sreekandan introduces a double-agent into their midst who promises them to make spurious Brandy. On a festival day this spurious liquor is served and many people are maimed for life or die. Vasu and Chacko then get Sreekandan killed.

The in-fighting, the criminal cases and the business pressures begin to take a toll on Vasu. Chacko in the meantime starts to like the rich life and squanders his wealth. Vasu always finds solace in Kunjappan, another Abkari contractor who wants the liquor business to be conducted in an ethical manner. Kunjappan, who came from humble origins, always reminds Vasu that he should never forget his past. Kunjappan, now rich, still maintains the small, old hut in which he was born, as a constant reminder of his past.

Vasu and Chacko also step into the domains (Abkari ranges) of other contractors. Until then, every contractor had his business area chalked out with others not contesting for these areas. But Vasu and Chacko started to bid for each and every possible range. The business understanding of Abkaris was broken. Soon the other contractors coalesced and plotted against Vasu and Chacko.

Chacko, who is reckless in financial dealings, loses a huge sum of money when he pays in advance for spirit which is never delivered. Chacko's daughter falls in love with their chauffeur, who comes from humble surroundings. The chauffeur is threatened but he continues the affair. So an angry Vasu kills him. This murder lands Vasu in trouble, as well. With a severe financial crunch and a major criminal case, the partners of VASCO find their situation unrecoverable. Chacko commits suicide, and Vasu pleads guilty to the murder and goes to prison. VASCO, a once formidable business empire, collapses.

== Cast ==
- Mammootty as Vasu
- Ratheesh as Chacko
- Urvashi as Sridevi
- Parvathy as Sharada
- Thiagarajan as KRC / Chidambaram
- M. G. Soman as Kunjappan
- Balan K. Nair as Chathunny
- Jalaja as Ammini
- T. G. Ravi as Sreekandan
- Jayamalini as Kanakam
- Kuthiravattam Pappu as Kumaran
- Janardhanan as Karthikeyan
- Devan as Jayaprakash (excise officer)
- Prathapachandran as Kaimal (excise officer)
- Vincent as Chandran, Police Officer
- Kundara Johny as Peethambaran
- Sankaradi as Govindan
- Paravoor Bharathan as Swamy
- C. I. Paul as George
- Kunchan as Mani
- Valsala Menon as Madhavi
- Tony as Radhakrishnan
- Santhakumari

== Release ==
The film was released on 14 April 1988.

=== Box office ===
The film was a Disaster..
