= Choodatha Pookal =

- Directed by: M. S. Baby
- Written by: V. Gopalakrishnan Nair; Vijayan (dialogues)
- Screenplay by: Vijayan
- Produced by: V. Gopalakrishnan Nair
- Starring: Sukumaran; Lakshmi; Ratheesh; T. R. Omana
- Cinematography: Vipin Das
- Edited by: G. Murali
- Music by: K. J. Joy
- Production company: VGN International
- Distributed by: VGN International
- Release date: 15 February 1985
- Country: India
- Language: Malayalam

Choodatha Pookal is a 1985 Indian Malayalam film, directed by M. S. Baby and produced by V. Gopalakrishnan Nair. It stars Sukumaran, Lakshmi, Ratheesh, and T. R. Omana in the lead roles. The film has a musical score by K. J. Joy.

== Cast ==
- Sukumaran as Mohan
- Ratheesh as Prem
- Shankar as Ravi
- Lakshmi as Hema
- Zarina Wahab as Sreedevi
- Kalpana
- T. G. Ravi as Warrier
- T. R. Omana
- Vijay Menon as Suresh
- Prathapachandran
- Balan K. Nair
- Kunchan
- Master Vimal

== Plot ==
Hema, Prem, Ravi, and Sreedevi are college mates. Prem and Ravi liked Hema, but she saw them as friends. During her MBBS course, Hema meets Mohan and falls in love with him. Mohan has to leave for home owing to his father's poor health. He marries Sreedevi as the last wish of his father. Hema learns about it from a letter sent by Mohan.

Hema is a leading surgeon in a hospital now. Accidentally she meets Sreedvi and Mohan while Sreedevi is not aware of their past relationship. Hema saves the life of Mohan's son who met with an accident on the day when Hema lost her brother in another accident. Sreedevi tries to renew her friendship with Hema while Mohan is worried whether Hema's visit will spoil his family.

Sreedevi discovers the past relationship of Hema and Mohan from a letter she finds from Hema's house. Sreedevi doubts both Mohan and Hema. Sreedevi plans to leave Mohan due to their past relationship and suspicion, and Hema sacrifices her life to avoid separation of the couple because of her.

== Soundtrack ==
The music was composed by K. J. Joy, and the lyrics were written by Poovachal Khader and O. N. V. Kurup.

No.	Song	Singers	Lyrics	Length (m:ss)
1	"Innen Kinaavil"	Vani Jairam	Poovachal Khader	
2	"Manjanippoovin"	P. Susheela	Poovachal Khader	
3	"Oduvilee Sishirathin"	K. J. Yesudas	O. N. V. Kurup	
