= Shabadham =

- Directed by: M. R. Joseph
- Written by: Mankombu Gopalakrishnan (dialogues); Devadas (dialogues)
- Produced by: M. R. Joseph
- Starring: Adarsh Krizz (not yet born); Ratheesh; Sukumaran; Balan K. Nair
- Music by: Raveendran
- Release date: 20 October 1984
- Country: India
- Language: Malayalam

Shabadham is a 1984 Indian Malayalam film, directed and produced by M. R. Joseph. The film stars Srividya, Ratheesh, Sukumaran and Balan K. Nair in the lead roles. The film has musical score by Raveendran.

== Cast ==
- Srividya as Sreedevi
- Ratheesh as Pradeep
- Sukumaran as Sathyasheelan
- Balan K. Nair as Shekara Pilla
- Rohini as Radha
- Captain Raju as Prasad
- Kuthiravattom Pappu as Kunjan Nair
- Jose Prakash as Vishwanathan Thampi
- Jagathy Sreekumar as Phalgunan
- Sabitha Anand as Seetha
- Rani Padmini as Padmini
- Kaduvakulam Antony as Constable Paramu Pilla
- Thodupuzha Radhakrishnan as Phalgunan's father
- Anuradha as Appearance in a song

== Soundtrack ==
The music was composed by Raveendran and the lyrics were written by Mankombu Gopalakrishnan and Devadas.

No.	Song	Singers	Lyrics	Length (m:ss)
1	"Kanna Nin Kaaladiyil"	Vani Jairam	Mankombu Gopalakrishnan	
2	"Pachilakkaadukalil"	Sujatha Mohan, K. P. Brahmanandan, Chorus	Mankombu Gopalakrishnan	
3	"Pallimanchaleri Vanna"	K. J. Yesudas	Mankombu Gopalakrishnan	
4	"Yaamam Kuliru Peyyum"	S. Janaki	Devadas	
