= Thushaaram =

- Promotional Poster
- Directed by: I. V. Sasi
- Written by: T. Damodaran
- Produced by: Geo Movies; N. G. John
- Starring: Ratheesh; Seema; Jose
- Music by: Shyam; Yusufali Kecheri (lyrics)
- Release date: 10 April 1981
- Running time: 130 min.
- Language: Malayalam

Thushaaram is a 1981 Indian Malayalam-language action film directed by I. V. Sasi, starring Ratheesh, Seema, Rani Padmini and Jose. Lyrics were written by Yusafali and the music score by Shyam. The film, originally was planned with actor Jayan, but his death forced the makers to cast Ratheesh, a struggling actor as the lead.

== Plot ==
Raveedran is an officer of the Indian army. Raveedran and his wife stay in army quarters in Kashmir, he is working under Malayali brigadier. One day Raveedran's wife commits suicide. He does not understand why. After some days he realizes that it was murder. The Brigadier had killed his wife. Then Raveendran kidnaps the brigadier's daughter for revenge. When the Brigadier's daughter understands Raveedran's story, she loves him.

In the climax the brigadier is punished by army court and loses his job.

== Cast ==
- Ratheesh as Cap. P. Raveendran
- Seema as Dr. Sindhu Menon
- Rani Padmini (actress) as Shobha Raveendran
- Jose as Cap. Vijayan Menon
- Balan K. Nair as Brig. Rajashekhara Menon
- Kundara Johny as Cap. Nair
- Kunchan as Cap. Alexander
- Lalu Alex as Cap. Alex
- Nellikkode Bhaskaran as Govindan Nair
- Jaffer Khan as Jaffer Khan

== Remake ==
Thushaaram was shot in Kashmir. The film was remade in Bollywood as Insaaf Main Karoonga with Rajesh Khanna playing the lead role.
