= Akkacheyude Kunjuvava =

1985 film

Akkachiyude Kunjuvava
- Directed by: Sajan
- Written by: Salim Cherthala
- Screenplay by: Salim Cherthala
- Starring: Shobana; Jose Prakash; Ratheesh; Lalu Alex
- Cinematography: C. E. Babu
- Edited by: V. P. Krishnan
- Music by: Johnson
- Production company: Josi Mini Movie Makers
- Distributed by: Josi Mini Movie Makers
- Release date: 8 July 1985
- Country: India
- Language: Malayalam

Akkacheyude Kunjuvava is a 1985 Indian Malayalam film, directed by Sajan. The film stars Shobana, Jose Prakash, Ratheesh and Lalu Alex in the lead roles. The film has musical score by Johnson. This novel is published in powradhwani weekly.

== Cast ==
- Ratheesh as Prasanthan
- Shobana
- Uma Banerji
- Jose Prakash
- Lalu Alex as Jayarajan
- Baby Shalini as Chacky Mol daughter of Prasanthan
- Mala Aravindan Driver to Prasanthan
- T. G. Ravi
- Thilakan
- V. D. Rajappan
- Prathapachandran
- Balan K. Nair
- Master Boban
- Meena
- P. K. Abraham
- Ranipadmini
- Sumithra
- Thodupuzha Vasanthi

== Soundtrack ==
All lyrics are written by Poovachal Khader; all music is composed by Johnson.

| No. | Title | Artist(s) | Length |
|---|---|---|---|
| 1. | "Karalile Kili Padi" | K. J. Yesudas, Vani Jairam |
| 2. | "Sundarikkutty Chirikkunna" | S. Janaki |
| 3. | "Thaalam Thaalolam" | S. Janaki |
