= Komaram =

Komaran
- Directed by: J. C. George
- Written by: J. C. George
- Screenplay by: J. C. George
- Produced by: Prabhakaran Thattiriyattu
- Starring: Mammootty; Nedumudi Venu
- Cinematography: G. Kutty
- Edited by: K. Narayanan
- Music by: Kottayam Joy
- Production company: Thathiriyattu Films
- Distributed by: Thathiriyattu Films
- Release date: 7 May 1982
- Country: India
- Language: Malayalam

Komaram is a 1982 Indian Malayalam-language film, directed by J. C. George and produced by Prabhakaran Thattiriyattu. The film stars Mammootty, Nedumudi Venu and Beena. Jayan was initially approached to play the hero of the film but his sudden demise made the producers to cast Mammootty, who was a budding star at the time. The film has musical score by Kottayam Joy.

== Cast ==
- Mammootty as Babu
- Nedumudi Venu
- Beena
- Sreenivasan
- Kalaranjini
- Balan K. Nair
- C. C. Varghese
- Jalaja
- Kundara Johny
- Lalithasree
- Mala Aravindan
- Raji
- Ravi Menon
- Seema

== Soundtrack ==
The music was composed by Kottayam Joy and the lyrics were written by Trichur Biju.

No.	Song	Singers	Lyrics	Length (m:ss)
1	"Aamala Keri"	Vani Jairam	Trichur Biju	
2	"Sheethala Sharathkaala Sandhyayil"	K. J. Yesudas	Trichur Biju	
