= Vetta =

- Official poster
- Directed by: Mohanroop
- Written by: Kaval Surendran
- Produced by: Dr. Chandrangadan; Sudheesh Kumar
- Starring: Mohanlal; Mammootty; Sreenivasan; Adoor Bhasi
- Cinematography: Vipin Das
- Edited by: K. Sankunni
- Music by: M. G. Radhakrishnan
- Production company: Gallery Films
- Release date: 13 July 1984
- Country: India
- Language: Malayalam

Vetta (transl. The hunt) is a 1984 Indian Malayalam-language drama film directed by Mohanroop (in his directorial debut). It stars Mohanlal, Mammootty, Sreenivasan, Adoor Bhasi, and Balan K. Nair in major roles. The musical score was composed by M. G. Radhakrishnan.

== Cast ==
- Mohanlal as Balan
- Mammootty as Ratheesh
- Adoor Bhasi
- Sreenivasan
- Balan K. Nair
- T. G. Ravi
- Raveendran
- Prameela
- Anjali Naidu

== Soundtrack ==
The film's music consists of four tracks composed by M. G. Radhakrishnan and sung by K. J. Yesudas and Seema Behan.

No.	Track	Singer	Lyricist
1	"Madaalasa"	Seema Behan	Ajeer Ilamkaaman
2	"Thudi thudi"	Seema Behan	Chirayinkeezhu Ramakrishnan Nair
3	"Ullala thenala"	K. J. Yesudas	Chirayinkeezhu Ramakrishnan Nair
4	"Vilaasa Lathike"	K. J. Yesudas	Chirayinkeezhu Ramakrishnan Nair
