= Bullet (1984 film) =

- Directed by: Crossbelt Mani
- Written by: Cheri Viswanath
- Produced by: Royal Pictures
- Starring: Ratheesh; Balan K Nair; Bheeman Raghu; Kuthiravattam Pappu
- Music by: Guna Singh
- Release date: 29 June 1984
- Country: India
- Language: Malayalam

Bullet is a 1984 Indian Malayalam film, directed by Crossbelt Mani and produced by Royal Pictures. The film stars Ratheesh, Balan K Nair, Bheeman Raghu and Kuthiravattam Pappu in lead roles. The musical score is by Guna Singh.

== Cast ==
- Ratheesh
- Balan K Nair
- Bheeman Raghu
- Kuthiravattam Pappu
- Silk Smitha
- Swapna
- Vettoor Purushan
