= Nulli Novikkathe =

- Directed by: Mohan Roop
- Written by: Basheer Palakkad; Mohan Roop (dialogues)
- Screenplay by: Mohan Roop
- Produced by: Basheer Palakkad
- Starring: Balan K. Nair; Madhuri; Sabitha Anand; Shivaji
- Cinematography: Saloo George
- Edited by: Chandran
- Music by: Rajamani
- Production company: Plaza Productions
- Distributed by: Plaza Productions
- Release date: 24 October 1985
- Country: India
- Language: Malayalam

Nulli Novikkathe is a 1985 Indian Malayalam-language film, directed by Mohan Roop and produced by Basheer Palakkad. The film stars Balan K. Nair, Madhuri, Sabitha Anand and Shivaji in the lead roles. The film has musical score by Rajamani.

== Cast ==
- Balan K. Nair
- Madhuri
- Sabitha Anand
- Shivaji
- T. G. Ravi
- Roshni

== Soundtrack ==
The music was composed by Rajamani with lyrics by Poovachal Khader and Vadakkumthara Ramachandran.

No.	Song	Singers	Lyrics	Length (m:ss)
1	"Eeran Meghangal"	K. J. Yesudas	Poovachal Khader	
2	"Thaalangal Maarunnu"	K. J. Yesudas	Poovachal Khader	
3	"Vannethi"	K. J. Yesudas, Chorus	Vadakkumthara Ramachandran	
