= Ente Shabdham =

- Directed by: V. K. Unnikrishnan
- Starring: Jagathy Sreekumar; Ratheesh; Madhuri; Seema
- Cinematography: S. J. Thomas
- Edited by: K. Rajagopal
- Music by: A. T. Ummer
- Production company: Sree Films International
- Distributed by: Sree Films International
- Release date: 23 October 1986
- Country: India
- Language: Malayalam

Ente Shabdham is a 1986 Indian Malayalam film, directed by V. K. Unnikrishnan. The film stars Jagathy Sreekumar, Ratheesh, Madhuri and Seema in the lead roles. The film has musical score by A. T. Ummer.

== Cast ==
- Jagathy Sreekumar as Vasu
- Ratheesh as Rajan
- Madhuri
- Seema
- T. G. Ravi as Thambi
- Raveendran as Sivan
- T. R. Omana
- Santhosh as Abu
- Jose as Vijay
- Sabitha Anand as Laila
- Ramu as Sudhakaran
- Vijayan as Police Officer

== Soundtrack ==
The music was composed by A. T. Ummer and the lyrics were written by Poovachal Khader.

No.	Song	Singers	Lyrics	Length (m:ss)
1	"Madanamandaara Mottaanu"	Lathika	Poovachal Khader	
2	"Poonthattamittoru"	K. S. Chithra	Poovachal Khader	
