= Ratheesh =

Indian actor

- Born: Ratheesh Rajagopal; 11 September 1954; Kalavoor, State of Travancore–Cochin (present day Alappuzha, Kerala), India
- Died: 23 December 2002 (aged 48); Coimbatore, Tamil Nadu, India
- Education: Sree Narayana College, Kollam; Sree Narayana College, Cherthala
- Years active: 1977–1990; 1994–2002
- Spouse: Diana (m. 1983)
- Children: Parvathy Ratheesh (daughter); Padmaraj Ratheesh (son); Padma Ratheesh (daughter); Pranav Ratheesh (son)
- Parents: Puthenpurayil A. V. Rajagopalan; Padmavathiyamma

Ratheesh (11 September 1954 – 23 December 2002) was an Indian actor best known for his work in Malayalam cinema. He was a native of Kalavoor in the Alappuzha district of Kerala, India. He performed villainous roles during the 1990s. He had acted in 158 films with directors such as K. G. George, I. V. Sasi, Joshiy, P. G. Vishwambharan, Thampy Kannamthanam, Sreekumaran Thampi, Rajasenan, P. K. Joseph and Shaji Kailas. Unlike other villains of the time, Ratheesh captivated the Malayalam movie lovers with his charms and handsome looks. He attained superstardom for a brief while during the 80s.

== Personal life ==
He was born to Puthenpurayil A. V. Rajagopalan and Padmavathiyamma at Kalavoor in the erstwhile State of Travancore–Cochin. He had two sisters, Sherly and Laila. He had his education from Sree Narayana College, Kollam and Sree Narayana College, Cherthala.

He was married to Diana, who is the daughter of Ex minister M. K. Hemachandran, on 11 September 1983. The couple have four children Parvathy, Padmaraj, Padma and Pranav. He died due to a heart attack at his home in Coimbatore on 23 December 2002, aged just 48.

== Career ==
Ratheesh started his career in the Malayalam film Vezhambal in 1977. But it was K. G. George who provided his big break through Ullkadal in 1979. He became a bankable star through I. V. Sasi's Thusharam in 1981.

From 1981 to 1988 he was at the peak of his career, performing in films like Oru Mukham Pala Mukham, Ee Nadu, Rajavinte Makan, Muhoortham 11.30, Sangharsham, Vazhiyorakazhchakal, Aayiram Kannukal, Abkari, Unaroo, Ithraym Kaalam, Uyarangalil, Thanthram, Akkachiyude Kunjuvava, John Jaffer Janardhanan, Innalenkil Nale and Ponthooval.

After 1988 he reduced the number of films in which he acted, he quit altogether after 1990. After a period of four years he made a comeback as the antagonist through Shaji Kailas's Commissioner. Throughout the 1990s, he did various villainous and character roles in films such as Kashmeeram, Nirnayam, Yuvathurki, 19 April, and Gangothri. In the 2000s, he was notable for his roles in Ravanaprabhu and Dany.

== Filmography ==
=== As an actor ===
==== Malayalam ====
Year	Title	Role	Notes
1977	Vezhambal		
1979	Ullkadal	Davis	
1979	Lilly Pookkal		
1980	Idimuzhakkam	Jose	
1980	Theekadal	Kanakan	
1980	Palattu Kunjikannan	Kunjikannan's father	
1980	Chamaram	Balan	
1980	Ishtamanu Pakshe		
1981	Thushaaram	Ravi	
1981	Pinneyum Pookunnnna Kadu		
1981	Greeshma Jwala	Karuthan	
1981	Valarthumrigangal	Chandran	
1981	Thrishna	Vijaya Shankar	
1981	Enne Snehikku Enne Mathram		
1981	Sangharasham	Mohan	
1981	Munnettam	Chandran	
1981	Visham	Babu	
1981	Hamshageetam		
1981	Karimpoocha	Joy	
1981	Ammakkorumma	Vijayan	
1981	Ahimsa	Bharathan	
1982	Idiyum Minnalum		
1982	Odukkam Thudakkam		
1982	Ee Nadu	MLA Venu	
1982	Chambal Kadu	Rahim	
1982	Oru Thira Pinneyum Thira	Mohan	
1982	Enthino Pookunna Pookal	Vishwanathan	
1982	Thadaakam	Rajendran	
1982	John Jaffer Janardhanan	John Vincent	
1982	Vidhichathum Kothichathum	Vinod	
1982	Amritha Geetam	Renjith	
1982	Sindoora Sandhyakku Mounam	Vinod	
1982	Innalenkil Nale	Vijayan	
1983	Theeram Thedunna Thira	Jayadevan	
1983	Himavahini	Sekharan	
1983	Gurudhakshina	Inspector Majeet	
1983	Aa Rathiri	Venu	
1983	Manasoru Maha Samudhram	Sanjayan	
1983	Coolie	Madhu	
1983	Belt Mathai	Rajashekharan	
1983	Ente Katha	Rajesh	
1983	America America	Vijay	
1983	Oru Mukham Pala Mukham	Raveendran Thampi	
1983	Nathi Muthal Nathi Vare	Ravi	
1983	Asuran		
1983	Iniyenkilum	Ashokan	
1983	Paalam		
1983	Arabikkadal		
1983	Yudham	Prabhakara Menon/Rajesh	
1983	Nizhal Moodiya Nirangal	Baby	
1983	Lekhayude Maranam Oru Flashback	Guest Appearance	
1983	Ponnethooval		
1984	Oru Sumagaliyude Katha	Johny	
1984	Kodathi	Salim	
1984	Nethavau		
1984	Swarnna Gopuram	Dr Johny	
1984	Ethirppukal	Raghu	
1984	Raajavembaala		
1984	Theera Prathishikathe	Vijayan	
1984	Makale Mappu Tharoo		
1984	Ningalil Oru Stree	Venu	
1984	Kooduthedunna Parava	Gopi	
1984	Ivide Ingane	Jayan	
1984	Unaroo	Peter	
1984	Karimbu		
1984	Minimol Vathicanil	Mohan	
1984	Bullet		
1984	Uyarangalil	Inspector Ravi	
1984	Rakshassu	Ratheesh	
1984	Radhayude Kamukan		
1984	Aattuvanchi Ulanjappol	Murali	
1984	Mainakam		
1984	Shapadam	Pradeep Kumar	
1984	Oru Thettinte Katha		
1985	Muhoortham 11.30	Jayan	
1985	Choodatha Pookal	Prem	
1985	Maunanombaram		
1985	Ottayan	Ramesh	
1985	Shathru	Sudhindran	
1985	Nerariyum Nerathu	SI Mohan	
1985	Vellarikka Pattanam	Stephen	
1985	Guruji Oru Vakku	Gopu	
1985	Vasantha Sena	Kishore	
1985	Orunal Innoru Nal	Gopi	
1985	Snehicha Kuttathinu	Rajendran	
1985	Ezhu Muthal Onpathu Vare		
1985	Revenge	Johny	
1985	Akkacheyude Kunjuvava	Prasanthan	
1985	Anakkoru Umma	Devan	
1985	Saandham Bheekaram		
1985	Chorakku Chora	Khader	
1985	Black Mail	SI Vijayan	
1985	Janakeeya Kodathi		
1985	Kiratham	C. I. Hassan	
1985	Sannaham	Ramesh	
1986	Aayiram Kannukal	James	
1986	Rajavinte Makan	CM Krishnadas	
1986	Ilanjipookal	Balachandran	
1986	Viswasichalum Illenkilum		
1986	Ee Kaikalil	Jayadevan	
1986	Veendum	Robert d'Souza	
1986	Udayam Padinjaru	Balakrishnan	
1986	Kulambadikal		
1986	Annoru Ravil	Venu	
1986	Ente Shabdam	Rajan	
1986	Ithu Oru Thudakkom Mathram		
1986	Karinagam		
1986	Ente Sonia	Jagan	
1986	Ithramathram	Rameshan	
1986	Onnu Randu Moonnu		
1986	Surabhi Yamangal	Murali	
1987	Kanikanum Neram	Raghu	
1987	Aattakatha		
1987	Itrayum Kalam	Mathukutty	
1987	Adimakal Udamakal	Sukumaran	
1987	Vazhiyora Kazhchakal	Babu	
1987	Kottum Kuravayum		
1987	Agni Muhurtham		
1987	Itha Samayamayi	Sunny	
1987	Naradhan Keralathil	Sub Inspector	
1987	Kalathinte Sabdham	Vijayan	
1987	Theekattu	Jayadevan	
1988	Abkari	Chacko	
1988	1921	Lavakkutti	
1988	Ormayilennum	Mammukoya	
1988	Shankunadham		
1988	Thanthram	James	
1988	Onninu Purake Mattonnu		
1988	Onnum Onnum Pathinonnu	Vinod	
1988	Rahasyam Paramarahasyam	Rajan	
1989	Prabhatham Chuvanna Theruvil		
1989	Niyamam Entu Cheyum	Sub Inspector	
1989	Kalalpada	Scaria Punnakkadan	
1989	Azhikkoru Muthu	Raveendran	
1990	Ayyar The Great	Police Officer	
1991	Karppooradeepam		
1994	Commissioner	Mohan Thomas	
1994	Kashmeeram	Balram	
1994	The City	Jayadevan	
1994	Pidakkozhi Koovunna Noottandu	Tony Varghese	
1994	Paalayam	Shivankutty	
1994	Cabinet	KRS/Sreedharan	
1994	Kambolam	Kariya	
1994	Puthran	Angelose	
1995	Nirnayam	Dr. Marcos	
1995	Agnidevan	Anantharaman	
1995	Thakshashila	Prince	
1995	Indian Military Intelligence	Auto decoratives proprietor	
1996	Yuvathurki	Dharman	
1996	Man of the Match	N. R. Bhaskaran	
1996	19 April		
1996	Hitlist	Thomaskutty	
1997	Gangothri	S. Krishnadas	
1997	Vamsham		
1999	James Bond	Sunny, Baby's Father	
1999	The Godman	Commissioner Chandrashekharan	
2001	Ravanaprabhu	Maniyampra Purushothaman	
2002	Dany	Dr. Renji Thomas	
2002	Shivam	Umman Koshi	

==== Tamil films ====
Year	Title	Role	Notes
1981	Madumalar		
1990	Salem Vishnu	Ashokan	
1991	Gnana Paravai		

=== Produced films ===
- Iyer The Great (1990)
- Chakkikotha Chankaran (1989)
- Ente Shabtham (1986)
- Black Mail (1985)
- Revenge (1985)

== Television ==
- 2001: Venalmazha (Surya TV)
- 2001 : Anna (Kairali TV)
