= America America (1983 film) =

- Directed by: I. V. Sasi
- Written by: T. Damodaran
- Screenplay by: T. Damodaran
- Starring: Mammootty; Lakshmi; Ratheesh; Balan K. Nair
- Cinematography: C.E. Babu
- Edited by: K. Narayanan
- Music by: Shyam
- Production company: Vijayathara
- Distributed by: Vijayathara
- Release date: 29 April 1983
- Country: India
- Language: Malayalam

America America is a 1983 Indian Malayalam film, directed by I. V. Sasi. The film stars Mammootty, Lakshmi, Ratheesh and Balan K. Nair in the lead roles. The film has musical score by Shyam.

== Cast ==
- Mammootty as Ramesh
- Lakshmi as Anuradha
- Ratheesh as Vijay
- Balan K. Nair as Jackson
- Seema as Neena
- Pratap Pothen as Baby
- K.P. Ummer as Capt RK Menon
- Tara Vijayan as Sithara

== Soundtrack ==
The music was composed by Shyam and the lyrics were written by Bichu Thirumala.

No.	Song	Singers	Lyrics	Length (m:ss)
1	"Daffodils Veendum Viriyunnu"	K. J. Yesudas, S. Janaki	Bichu Thirumala	
2	"Etho Janma Bandham"	K. J. Yesudas	Bichu Thirumala	
3	"Never on a Sunday"	Krishnachandran, Martha Kalyan	Bichu Thirumala	
4	"Therirangiyithile Varoo"	S. Janaki, P. Jayachandran	Bichu Thirumala	
