= Idiyum Minnalum =

- Directed by: P. G. Vishwambharan
- Written by: S. L. Puram Sadanandan
- Screenplay by: S. L. Puram Sadanandan
- Starring: Prem Nazir; Srividya; Ratheesh; Kuthiravattam Pappu
- Cinematography: Jayanan Vincent
- Edited by: V. P. Krishnan
- Music by: Shyam
- Production company: Renjith Films
- Distributed by: Renjith Films
- Release date: 26 January 1982
- Country: India
- Language: Malayalam

Idiyum Minnalum is a 1982 Indian Malayalam film, directed by P. G. Vishwambharan. The film stars Prem Nazir, Srividya, Ratheesh and Kuthiravattam Pappu in the lead roles. The film has musical score by Shyam.

== Cast ==
- Prem Nazir
- Srividya
- Ratheesh
- Kuthiravattam Pappu
- Mammootty
- Shanthi Krishna

== Soundtrack ==
The music was composed by Shyam and the lyrics were written by Bichu Thirumala.

No.	Song	Singers	Lyrics	Length (m:ss)
1	"Chethohaarikal"	K. J. Yesudas	Bichu Thirumala	
2	"Kanchaavile Unmadam"	K. J. Yesudas	Bichu Thirumala	
3	"Raama Rasam Rasarasam"	S. Janaki	Bichu Thirumala	
