= T. G. Ravi =

Indian actor

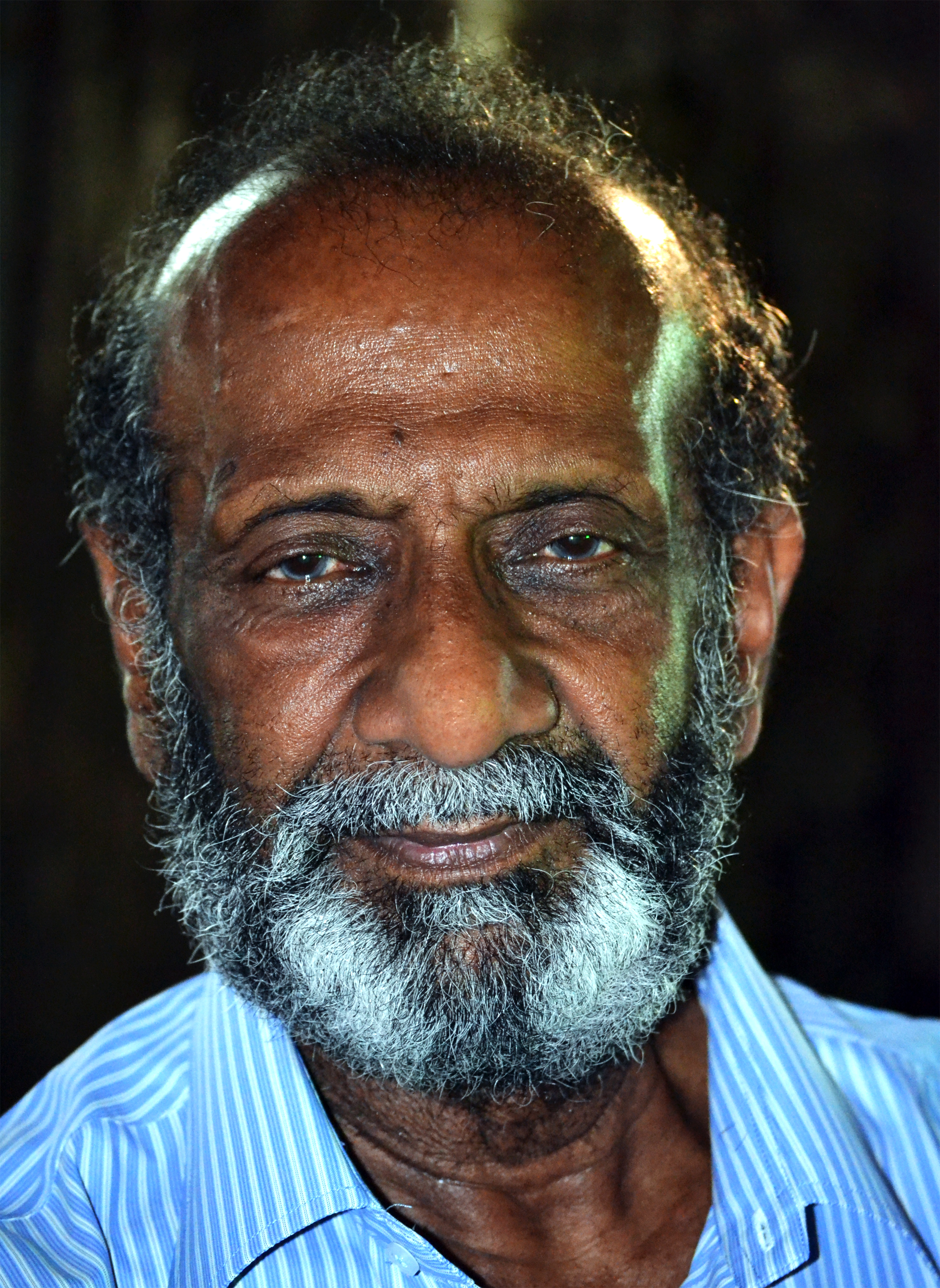
- Born: Ravindranathan; 16 May 1944 (age 82); Thrissur, Kingdom of Cochin, British India (present-day Kerala, India)
- Education: St. Thomas College, Thrissur; Government Engineering College, Thrissur
- Occupation: Actor
- Years active: 1970–Active
- Spouse: Dr. V. K. Subhadra (m. 1972; died 2011)
- Children: 2 (incl. Sreejith Ravi)
- Parents: T. R. Govindan Ezhuthachan; Kalyani
- Awards: Kerala State Film Awards

T. G. Ravindranathan (born 16 May 1944), popularly known as T. G. Ravi, is an Indian actor. He is known for his roles as a villain in Malayalam cinema. He along with Balan K. Nair played most of the negative roles in Malayalam cinema during the 1970s and 1980s. Known for his body language and style of dialogue delivery, he played some of the biggest villain roles in Malayalam cinema during that period.

== Early life and family ==
T.G. Ravi was born on 16 May 1944, in Moorkanikkara village, Thrissur, in present-day Kerala, India. After completion of pre-degree from St. Thomas College, Thrissur, he chose to pursue a career in engineering and undertook his degree course through University of Kerala in Government Engineering College, Thrissur. He graduated in mechanical engineering in 1969. Apart from involving in theatre arts, he also represented the University of Kerala in Football and Hockey. He was an artist at The All India Radio where he met Thikkodiyan, who was instrumental in introducing him to the silver screen.

== Acting career ==
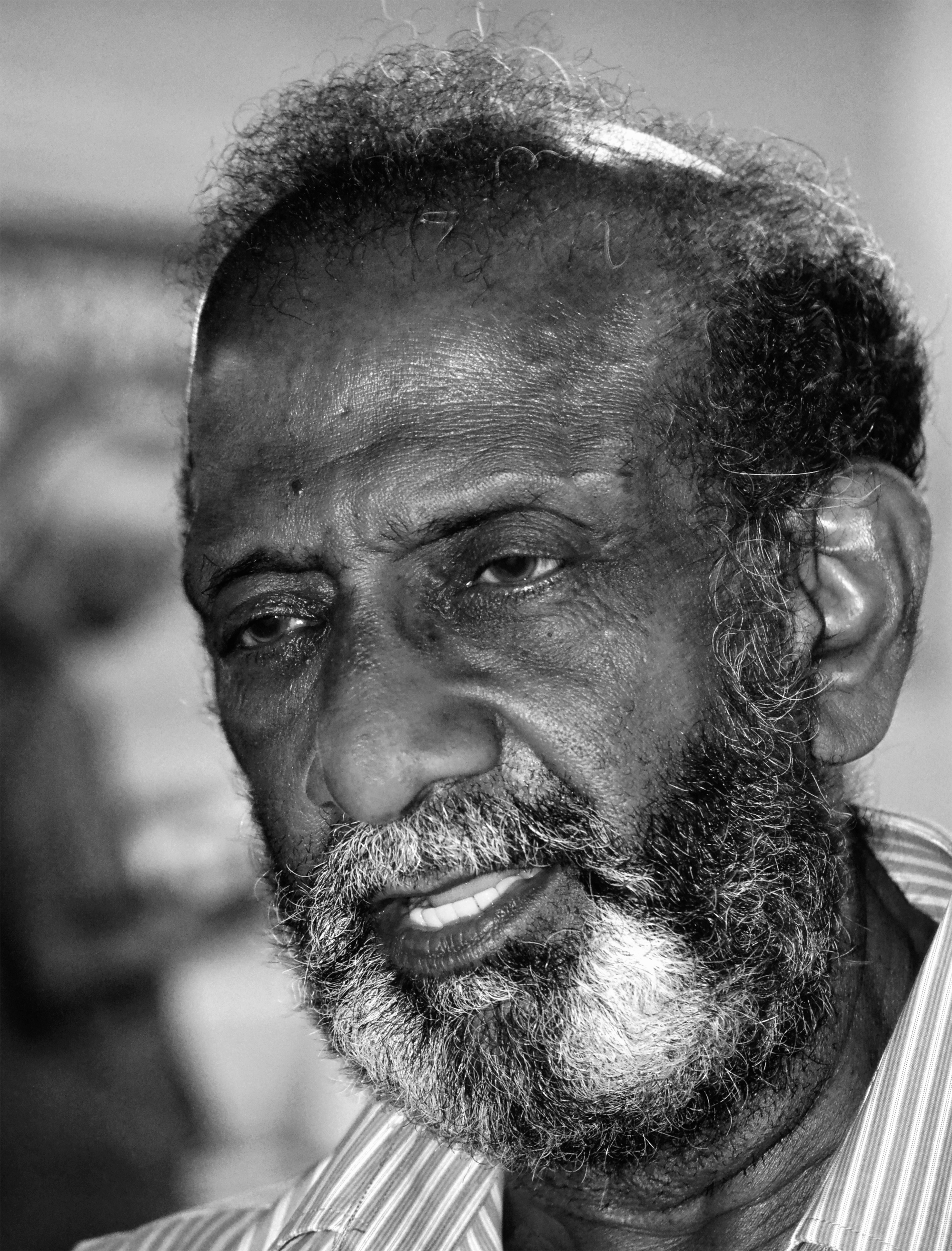
Ravi

Ravi began acting in the plays put up by the young men in his village, Moorkkanikkara, in Thrissur district. He also started acting in professional drama. Radio plays were popular in those days. Thikkodiyan introduced Ravi to Aravindan, a highly acclaimed Malayalam Director, which fetched him his first role in Uttarayanam.

But he didn't get any offers to act after that, so he produced a film himself, Paadasaram, in which he was, predictably, the hero. It flopped at the box office, but the next two films he produced, Chora Chuvanna Chora and Chakara, did better. The role of Shaji in Chakara opposite Jayan established him as a villain.

Among those who noticed him was director Bharathan. He cast Ravi in the role of Kunjippalu in Parankimala. The villain who spoke in the Thrissur dialect proved to be the turning point in his career. After Parankimala, as Ravi starred in many hits, including Ee Nadu, Iniyenkilum, Pathamudayam, 1921, NH 47, and Pavam Krooran.

He quit acting when he was at his peak, as one of the dreaded villains of Malayalam cinema in the late 1980s. T. G. Ravi is now active again as an actor, after a break. He restarted his career with Sibi Malayil's venture Amrutham in 2005, and then made noted performances in Pakal, Cycle, Romans, Jacobinte Swargarajyam, Georgettans Pooram, Red Wine, and The Priest.

== Personal life ==
He is a noted industrialist and has been instrumental in developing Thrissur as a major base for the rubber industries. He is the Managing Director of Suntec Tyres Limited. He has also served as the president of The Cochin Devaswom Board which controls the affairs of over 400 temples in Ernakulam, Thrissur and Palakkad districts.

He was married to (late) Dr. V. K. Subhadra, a retired government servant. He has two children: Ranjith, an alumnus of Indian Institute of Management Calcutta and London Business School and Sreejith Ravi, Malayalm film actor. Seema and Sajitha are his daughters-in-law. Milit, Rijrashwa, Mitul and Ritunjay are his grandsons and Minal is his granddaughter.

T. G. Ravi was the president of All Kerala Ezhuthachan Samajam.

== Filmography ==
=== As an actor ===
==== 1970s ====
Year	Title	Role	Notes
1974	Uttarayanam	Govindan	
1978	Paadasaram	Ravi	
1978	Bhrashtu		

==== 1980s ====
Year	Title	Role	Notes
1980	Chaakara	Shaji	
1980	Chora Chuvanna Chora	Kumaran	
1981	Parankimala	Kunjippalu	
1981	Vayal	Vaasu	
1981	Arayannam	Captain Rajan	
1981	Kodumudikal	Das	
1981	Chatta	Manikyan	
1981	Kadathu	Kala Dhamodharan	
1981	Ahimsa		
1981	Attimari	Ram Singh/Venu	
1981	Greeshma Jwala	Kariyachan	
1982	Idiyum Minnalum		
1982	Ee Nadu	Karunakaran	
1982	Koritharicha Naal	Ravi	
1982	Mattuvin Chattangale		
1982	Innallenkil Naale	Adv. Mathew Abraham	
1982	Jambulingam	Pazhani	
1982	Amrutha Geetham	Gopalan	
1982	Aakrosham	Bhadran	
1982	Balloon		
1982	Post Mortem	Chackochan	
1983	Kolakomban	Velu	
1983	Aadhipathyam	Rajendran	
1983	Deepaaradhana	Menon	
1983	Iniyengilum	Madhavan	
1983	Passport	Raghavan	
1983	Oru Mukham Pala Mukham		
1983	Rugma	Chacko	
1983	Aattakkalaasham	Rappayi	
1983	Sandhya Mayangum Neram	Ramu	
1983	Mortuary	Public Prosecutor	
1983	Mahaabali		
1984	Vikatakavi	Krishnankutty/ K. K. Nair	
1984	Thirakkil Alppa Samayam		
1984	Makale Mappu Tharu		
1984	Vetta		
1984	Karimbu		
1984	Oru Thettinde Kadha		
1984	Kurishuyudham	Issac John	
1984	Aagraham		
1984	NH47	Sudhakara Kurup	
1984	Unaroo		
1984	Ivide Ingane	Chandrasekharan	
1984	Paavam Krooran	Dhamodharan	
1984	Oru Kochukatha Aarum Parayatha Katha	Shanku	
1984	Poomadhathe Pennu	Kochaniyan	
1984	Raajavembaala		
1984	Nethavu		
1984	Kodathi	Divakaran	
1984	Aattuvanchi Ulanjappol		
1985	Nerariyum Nerathu	Keshavankutty	
1985	Oru Kochu Karyam		
1985	Choodatha Pookal	Warrier	
1985	Sannaham	Kaimal	
1985	Uyirthezhunnelppu		
1985	Akkacheyude Kunjuvava		
1985	Scene No. 7	Sankaran	
1985	Saandham Bheekaram		
1985	Angadikkappurathu	Alex	
1985	Ee Thanalil Ithiri Nerum		
1985	Ee Lokam Evide Kure Manushyar	Keshavan	
1985	Ithu Nalla Thamasha	Ouseph Muthalali	
1985	Nulli Novikkathe		
1985	Jeevante Jeevan	Police officer	
1985	Snehicha Kuttathinu	Kuttan Nair	
1985	Ezhu Muthal Onpathu Vare		
1985	Nayakan	Murugan	
1985	Pathamudayam	Lion C. Menon	
1985	Uyarum Njan Nadake	Kunjan	
1985	Manya Mahajanangale	Raghavan	
1985	Makan Ente Makan	Madhavan Nair	
1986	Ardha Raathri		
1986	Shobhraj	Raheem	
1986	Onnu Randu Moonnu		
1986	Atham Chithira Chothy	Fernandez	
1986	Ente Shabdham	Maheshwaran Thampi	
1986	Annoru Ravil		
1986	Ente Sonia		
1986	Padayani	Vikraman Nair	
1986	Karinagam		
1986	Vartha	Manikyam Kumar	
1986	Chilambu	Shankunni	
1987	Vamban	Dominic	
1987	Theekattu	Ramadas	
1987	Kottum Kuravayum		
1987	Naalkavala	Hussain Sahib	
1987	Neeyallengil Njan	Das Mavunkal	
1987	Jungle Boy	Forest Officer	
1987	P.C. 369	H.C. Cheenkanni Vasu Kurup	
1987	Kurukkan Rajavayi		
1987	Ithrayum Kaalam	Paili	
1988	Rahsyam Parama Rahasyam	Sudhakaran	
1988	Bheekaran	Vishwam	
1988	Agnichirakulla Thumbi		
1988	Onnum Onnum Pathinonnu		
1988	Anuragi	Samu's Appachan	
1988	Abkari	Sreekandan	
1988	1921	Variam Kunnath Kunhammad Haji	
1989	Aval Oru Sindhu		
1989	Prabhaatham Chuvanna Theruvil		
1989	Kodungallur Bhagavathy		

==== 1990s ====
Year	Title	Role	Notes
1990	Niyamam Enthucheyyum	Sathyapal	
1992	Sadayam	Kanaran	
1993	Bhoomi Geetham		
1993	Dhruvam	Kasi	
1994	Avan Ananthapadmanaabhan		
1997	V. I. P.	Shivadasan	

==== 2000s ====
Year	Title	Role	Notes
2004	Amrutham	Divakaran	
2005	Lokanathan IAS	Pappan	
2006	Vaasthavam	Gopinathan Unnithan	
2006	Rasathanthram	Retd Colonel Santhosh Kumar	
2006	Achanurangatha Veedu		
2006	Oruvan	Vilagannnur Ashan	
2006	Karutha Pakshikal	Muthuvannan	
2006	Pakal	Joseph	
2006	Chandranilekkoru Vazhi		
2006	Ashwaroodan	Kanara Panikkar	
2006	Prajapathi	Velappan Mooshari	
2007	Paradesi		
2007	Ali Bhai	Narayanan	
2007	Abraham & Lincoln	Minister Kottara Mathen	
2007	Ottakkayyan	Kallathokku Kanaran	
2007	Sketch		
2008	Anamika		
2008	Cycle		
2008	Mayabazar	Jose	
2008	Atayalangal	Raman Namboothiri	
2008	Chandranilekkoru Vazhi	Naxalite Vijayan	
2008	Positive		
2009	Jaanaki		
2009	Chattambinadu		
2009	Winter	Stalin	
2009	Shudharil Shudhan	Patta Krishnan	

==== 2010s ====
Year	Title	Role	Notes
2010	Pranchiyettan & the Saint	Uthuppu	
2010	Valiyangadi	Divakaran	
2011	Pakida Pakida Panthrandu		
2011	Cocoon		
2011	Naale		
2011	Maharaja Talkies		
2012	Akasathinte Niram		
2012	Thiruvambadi Thamban	Xavier	
2012	22 Female Kottayam	Ravi	
2013	Aattakatha		
2013	Isaac Newton S/O Philipose	Kochouseph	
2013	Romans	Pappichayan	
2013	Lucky Star	Bhaskaran	
2013	Celluloid	Older Sundararaj	
2013	Lokpal	Sathyanweshi Mukundan Menon	
2013	Red Wine	Narayanan	
2013	Buddy	Chandikunju	
2013	Punyalan Agarbattis	Achuthan Maash	
2014	Gangster	Hajikka	
2014	Varsha	Manavaalan Peter	
2014	Iyobinte Pusthakam	Narrator/An Old Comrade	
2015	Utopiayile Rajavu		
2015	Ayal Njanalla	Chandrammama	
2015	Su Su Sudhi Vathmeekam	Sudhi's father	
2016	Jacobinte Swargarajyam	Jacob's car driver	
2017	Georgettan's Pooram	Joseph "Josephettan"	
2017	Thrissivaperoor Kliptham	Kozhikkaran Cheru	
2018	Janaki		
2019	Porinju Mariam Jose	Anthony	
2019	Thrissur Pooram	Vettoly Balan	

==== 2020s ====
Year	Title	Role	Notes
2020	Kalamandalam Hyderali	Moidooty	
2020	Changampuzha Park	Devassikutty Mash	Short film
2021	Mohan Kumar Fans	Ravi	
2021	The Priest	Dr. Mathews	
2022	Bheeshma Parvam	Simon Pappan	
2022	Pada	Adv. Jayapalan	
2022	Kooman	Forest Ranger (Rtd.)	
2022	Malikappuram	Pattada	
2022	Aanaparambile World Cup		
2023	Thrishanku	Sethu's grandfather	
2023	Jaladhara Pumpset Since 1962	Adv. Ravi	
2023	Theeppori Benny	Pappettan	
2023	Bhagavan Dasante Ramrajyam		
2023	Avakasikal		
2024	Raastha		
2024	Manorathangal	Parameshwaran	Segment: Silalikhitham
2025	Rekhachithram	Pallasheri	
2025	Am Ah		
2025	916 Kunjoottan		
2025	Azadi	Adv. Gangadhara Menon	
2026	Thudakkam	Auto driver	
2027	Harivarasanam †	TBA	

=== As producer ===
1. Padasaram (1979)
2. Chora Chuvanna Chora (1980)
3. Chaakara (1980)

== Accolades ==
- 2007 : Kerala State Film Award – Special Mention (Films - Adayalangal, Ottakkayyan)
- Kerala State Government Television Award 2006 - Best Actor - Nizhalroopam
- 2013 : Kerala Film Critics Association Awards - Chalachitra Prathiba Puraskar
