= Chakara =

Marine phenomenon off India

A chakara (also Chaakara and in Malayalam ചാകര) is a natural marine phenomenon observed along the Malabar Coast of India, particularly in Kerala, where an extraordinary abundance of fish is brought close to the shore, sometimes even being washed ashore. The etymology of chakara relates to Malayalam words "Chaavu" and "Kara" meaning die on the shore, symbolising the huge stock of fish that piles up on the coast during these rare events.

Chakara typically occurs during the southwest monsoon season when upwelling—caused by wind-driven movements of the ocean—brings nutrient-rich water from the ocean depths to the surface. These nutrients promote plankton blooms, creating an abundant food source for fish, leading to their congregation in large numbers near the shore. The phenomenon is more pronounced near areas with unique underwater topography that enhances upwelling, such as the Kerala coast.

Locations of this rare occurrence are Purakkad in Alappuzha district and Kodungallur in Thrissur District in Kerala. A similar phenomenon is also observed in some coastal regions in South America.

== Cultural and Economic Significance ==
For the coastal communities, Chakara is a period of economic prosperity. The sudden fish catch provides them with unexpected wealth, allowing fishermen to reap significant economic benefits in a short span. The event has also found its way into local folklore and traditions, symbolising nature’s generosity.

Anthropogenic activities like overfishing and coastal development could impact its frequency and scale. Maintaining the health of coastal ecosystems is vital to ensure the sustainability of this phenomenon.
