= Paalam (1983 film) =

- Directed by: M. Krishnan Nair
- Written by: Hassan; A. Sheriff (dialogues)
- Screenplay by: A. Sheriff
- Starring: Madhu; Srividya; Ratheesh
- Cinematography: Vijaya Kumar
- Music by: A. T. Ummer
- Production company: Sajina Films
- Distributed by: Sajina Films
- Release date: 9 September 1983
- Country: India
- Language: Malayalam

Paalam is a 1983 Indian Malayalam-language film, directed by M. Krishnan Nair. The film stars Madhu, Srividya and Ratheesh. The film has musical score by A. T. Ummer.

== Cast ==
- Madhu
- Srividya
- Ratheesh
- Balan K. Nair
- Swapna
- Ravindran

== Soundtrack ==
The music was composed by A. T. Ummer with lyrics by Poovachal Khader.

No.	Song	Singers	Lyrics	Length (m:ss)
1	"Oh My Darling"	Kannur Salim	Poovachal Khader	
2	"Orajnjaatha Pushpam Vidarnnu"	S. Janaki, Krishnachandran	Poovachal Khader	
3	"Praanan Nee"	K. J. Yesudas	Poovachal Khader	
4	"Praanan Nee" (sad)	K. J. Yesudas	Poovachal Khader	
