= Ramu (actor) =

Indian actor

- Born: Bhasi Padikkal
- Occupations: Actor; businessman
- Years active: 1983–present
- Spouse: Reshmi
- Children: 2
- Relatives: Sukumaran (cousin); Indrajith Sukumaran (nephew); Prithviraj Sukumaran (nephew)

Bhasi Padikkal, professionally credited as Ramu, is an Indian actor who appears in Malayalam films. He has acted in more than 100 films, mainly portraying antagonistic roles. He wrote screenplay for the film Kalikkoottukar (2019).

== Early life ==
Ramu was born as the eldest among four children to Kochunni Nair and Devakiamma at Tavanur, Edappal. Malayalam actor Sukumaran is his elder cousin.

== Personal life ==
He married Reshmi in 1995. They have a daughter, Amritha and son Devadas, who was a child artist, acted in 2007 Malayalam movies Anandabhairavi and Athisayan.

== Filmography ==
=== As an actor ===
Year	Title	Role	Notes
1982	Ormakkayi	Peter	
1983	Aana	George Joy	
1983	Engane Nee Marakkum	Jayadevan	
1983	Oru Madapravinte Katha	Kochettan	
1983	Lekhayude Maranam Oru Flashback		
1983	Mortuary	Satheesh	
1983	Aadyathe Anuraagam	Rajasekharan Thampi	
1983	Saagaram Santham	Sreedevi's brother	
1984	Poomadhathe Pennu	Rajagopal	
1984	Minimol Vathicanil	James	
1984	Aashamsakalode	Chandran	
1984	Ente Kalithozhan		
1984	Theere Pratheekshikkathe	Raghu	
1984	Thirakkil Alppa Samayam	Majeed	
1985	Black Mail	Rajesh	
1985	Uyarum Njan Nadake	Rajendran	
1985	Aazhi		
1985	Njan Piranna Nattil	Jayan	
1985	Revenge		
1985	Ottayan	Police officer	
1986	Kulambadikal		
1986	Ayalvasi Oru Daridravasi		
1986	Ente Shabdham	Sudhakaran	
1986	Sakhavu		
1986	Ithra Maathram	Vijayan	
1986	Onnu Randu Moonnu		
1986	Bhagavaan		
1987	Neeyallengil Njan	Vinod	
1987	Avalude Katha		
1987	Sarvakalashala	Inspector	
1987	Maanasa Maine Varu		
1988	Bheekaran	SI Kannan	
1988	Sanghunadam	Rameshan	
1988	Moonnam Pakkam		
1989	Ivalente Kaamuki		
1989	Oru Vadakkan Veeragatha	Unnichandror	
1990	Arhatha	Mohammad	
1990	Niyamam Enthucheyyum		
1990	Prosecution	C.I. Cyriac John	
1991	Inspector Balram	Siddique	
1991	Koumara Swapnangal		
1991	Aswathy	Satheesh	
1992	Apaaratha	Jayapalan Panicker	
1993	Devaasuram	Kunjananthan	
1993	Butterflies	Jayan Menon	
1994	Kambolam		
1994	Sukham Sukhakaram		
1995	Special Squad	Bony	
1997	Aaraam Thampuran	Salim Ahmed	
2001	Raavanaprabhu	Kunjananthan	Cameo
2001	Sharja To Sharja	Kumaran Kappithan	
2004	Black	Francis	
2004	Perumazhakkalam	M. L. A. Salim Thangal	
2004	Chathikkatha Chanthu	Jagannathan	
2004	Vettam	Madhava Menon	
2005	Bus Conductor	Fasaludheen	
2006	Yes Your Honour	Musthafa	
2006	Red Salute	S.P. Mohammed Kasim	
2007	Athisayan	Yunus Kunju	
2007	Chotta Mumbai	DGP Rajendran Nair	
2007	Black Cat	Prakash Kumar	
2008	Roudram	IG Balagopal IPS	
2008	Magic Lamp	Alphonsa's elder brother	
2010	Nilavu		
2010	Pranchiyettan & the Saint	Bahuleyan	
2010	Kaaryasthan	Kizhakkedathu Sreedharan	
2010	Thanthonni	Vadakkan Veettil Thomachen	
2011	Arjunan Saakshi	Commissioner Jayaraman	
2011	Vellaripravinte Changathi	Augustien Joseph	
2012	Cobra	Raja's uncle	
2012	Thattathin Marayathu	Abdul Khader	
2012	Simhasanam	Kuruvila Jacob	
2012	Ayalum Njanum Thammil		
2012	Grandmaster		
2012	Mr. Pavanayi 99.99		
2013	Yathrakkoduvil	Vishwambaran	
2013	Careebeyans	D.I.G.	
2013	Ezhu Sundara Rathrikal	Aby's father	
2014	Manglish	Sulaiman Haji	
2016	Pa Va	Dr. Mathew	
2018	Naam	Mohammed	Cameo
2018	Ente Ummante Peru	Moideen	
2020	Forensic	Rajeev Madhavan IPS	
2022	Aaraattu	DGP Santhosh Menon IPS	
2022	Salute	I. G. Sam Eapan Koshy	
2022	Kaapa		
2022	Pathonpatham Noottandu	Diwan	
2024	Rifle Club	Contractor Punnoose	

=== As a writer ===
- Kalikkoottukar (2019)
