= Balan K. Nair =

Indian actor (1933-2000)

- Born: Balakrishnan Nair; 4 April 1933; Chemancheri, Kozhikode, Malabar district, British India (present day Kozhikode, Kerala, India)
- Died: 26 August 2000 (aged 67); Thiruvananthapuram, Kerala, India
- Occupation: Actor
- Years active: 1970 – 1992
- Spouse: Sarada Nair
- Children: 5 (incl. Meghanathan)
- Parents: Idakkulam Karinattu Veettil Kuttiraman Nair; Devaki Amma

Balakrishnan Kuttiraman Nair, more popularly known as Balan K. Nair (4 April 1933 – 26 August 2000) was an Indian actor known for his roles in Malayalam cinema. Although he appeared as a villain in most films, he was also noted for his performances in strong character roles. He emerged as one of the top villain of Malayalam cinema in the second half of the 1970s and played some of the best villain characters in Malayalam films during that period. He won the National Film Award for Best Actor in 1981 for his performance as Govindan in the film Oppol.

== Personal life ==
Balakrishnan Kuttiraman (Balan K.) Nair was the eldest of four children of Idakkulam Kizhakke Veettil Kuttiraman Nair, a store owner, and Devaki Amma, a housewife in 1933 in the village of Chemancheri near Quilandy. His parents died when he was young and hence he had to take care of his siblings and discontinue his studies at eighth grade. Prior to his entry in films, he worked as a mechanic in Kozhikode and owned a metal workshop. He started his acting career at the age of 14. At that time he was associated with Sangamam Theatre in Kozhikode, Muthappankavu troupe, Kozhikodan drama troupes and his own drama troupe Subash Theaters. After his marriage to Sharadha, he moved to Shoranur in Palakkad. His son Meghanathan is also an actor who died in 2024.

Balan K. Nair died of Multiple myeloma at Sree Chitra Institute of Medical Sciences Hospital, Thiruvananthapuram on 26 August 2000, aged 67.

== Film career ==
Balan K. Nair made his debut in the film Nizhalattam, directed by A. Vincent in 1970. Prior to acting in Malayalam movies, he worked as a stunt double for Bollywood star Dev Anand. He acted in more than 300 films in Malayalam, mostly as a villain. He won the Kerala State Film Award for Second Best Actor in 1974 and 1978 for his roles in Adhiti and Thacholi Ambu. He won the National Film Award for Best Actor for his role as a reformed military officer in the 1981 film Oppol.

Some of his other well-known movies are Ee Naadu, Aaryan, and Oru Vadakkan Veeragatha. His last movie was Kadavu, in which he played the role of an oarsman directed by the novelist M. T. Vasudevan Nair based on a story by another famous literary figure S. K. Pottekkatt.

== Awards ==
National Film Awards:

- Best Actor – 1981 – Oppol

Kerala State Film Awards:

- Second Best Actor – 1974 – Adhithi
- Second Best Actor – 1978 – Thacholi Ambu

== Filmography ==
=== Malayalam ===
==== 1970s ====
| Year | Title | Role | Notes |
|---|---|---|---|
| 1970 | Nizhalattam | Balan | |
| 1971 | Kuttyedathi | Kuttayi | |
| 1972 | Panimudakku | Balan | |
| 1972 | Chembarathi | Thomas | |
| 1972 | Mappusakshi | | |
| 1973 | Mazhakkaru | | |
| 1973 | Darshanam | | |
| 1973 | Ragging | | |
| 1973 | Soundarya Pooja | | |
| 1973 | Swapnam | | |
| 1973 | Chenda | | |
| 1974 | Pathiravum Pakalvelichavum | | |
| 1974 | Thacholi Marumakan Chanthu | Yenali | |
| 1974 | Udayam Kizhakku Thanne | | |
| 1975 | Utharayanam | Achuthan | |
| 1975 | Athithi | Raghavan | |
| 1976 | Samasya | | |
| 1976 | Ammini Ammavan | Balan | |
| 1976 | Yudhabhoomi | | |
| 1976 | Chottanikkara Amma | Vilwamangalam Swamiyar | |
| 1976 | Panchami | Kochuvareed | |
| 1976 | Njavalpazhangal | | |
| 1977 | Aparadhi | Malayi Kunjumon | |
| 1978 | Rowdy Ramu | Bhasi | |
| 1978 | Chuvanna Vithukal | | |
| 1978 | Ashokavanam | | |
| 1978 | Black Belt | | |
| 1978 | Ahalya | | |
| 1978 | Vayanadan Thampan | | |
| 1978 | Agni | Moosa | |
| 1978 | Thacholi Ambu | Mayin Kuttiyil | |
| 1979 | Indradhanussu | Mammad | |
| 1979 | Anubhavangale Nandi | | |
| 1979 | Valeduthavan Valal | | |
| 1979 | Vijayam Nammude Senani | | |
| 1979 | Oru Ragam Pala Thalam | | |
| 1979 | Arattu | Chacko | |
| 1979 | Maamaankam | | |
| 1979 | Yakshipparu | Irumban | |
| 1979 | Thenthulli | | |

==== 1980s ====
| Year | Title | Role | Notes |
|---|---|---|---|
| 1980 | Moorkhan | Major Chandrasekhar | |
| 1980 | Lava | Velayudhan | |
| 1980 | Idimuzhakkam | Govindan Unnithan | |
| 1980 | Makara Vilakku | | |
| 1980 | Karimbana | Chellayan | |
| 1980 | Kalika | Jamal | |
| 1980 | Kari Puranda Jeevithangal | Daniel | |
| 1980 | Ival Ee Vazhi Ithu Vare | | |
| 1980 | Benz Vasu | Varkey | |
| 1980 | Aswaradham | Veeraraghavan | |
| 1980 | Prakadanam | Chacko | |
| 1980 | Ivar | Avaran Muthalali | |
| 1980 | Baktha Hanuman | Ravanan | |
| 1980 | Angadi | Beeran | |
| 1980 | Chandrahasam | Bhaskaran | |
| 1980 | Lorry | Ouseph | |
| 1980 | Oppol | Govindan | |
| 1981 | Kolilakkam | | |
| 1981 | Attimari | Prasad | |
| 1981 | Itha Oru Dhikkari | Govinda Panikkar | |
| 1981 | Poochasanyasi | | |
| 1981 | Adimachangala | | |
| 1981 | Vazhikal Yathrakkar | | |
| 1981 | Randu Mukhangal | | |
| 1981 | Chaatta | Velu | |
| 1981 | Oppol | Govindan | |
| 1981 | Raktham | Padmanabhan | |
| 1981 | Sangarsham | Parsha/Vikraman | |
| 1981 | Thrasam | | |
| 1981 | Ithihasam | Thankappan | |
| 1981 | Akramanam | Majeed | |
| 1981 | Thusharam | Rajeshekharan Menon | |
| 1981 | Garjanam | | |
| 1981 | Valarthu Mrigangal | Kumaran | |
| 1981 | Sphodanam | Muthalali | |
| 1981 | Ahimsa | Kunjutty | |
| 1981 | Hamsageetham | | |
| 1982 | Koritharicha Naal | | |
| 1982 | Postmortem | Mammokka | |
| 1982 | Sree Ayappanum Vavarum | Otheyanan | |
| 1982 | Beedikunjamma | Kunjamma's Father | |
| 1982 | Irattimadhuram | K.B. Menon | |
| 1982 | Ethiralikal | Mathai | |
| 1982 | Paanjajanyam | Balan | |
| 1982 | Thadakam | Gopakumar | |
| 1982 | Marupacha | Mammadikka | |
| 1982 | Ahimsa | Kunjutty | |
| 1982 | Kattile Pattu | Panikkar | |
| 1982 | Idavela | | |
| 1982 | Aayudham | Prathapan | |
| 1982 | John Jaffer Janardhanan | Chandran | |
| 1982 | Sindoora Sandhyakku Mounam | Sekhar | |
| 1982 | Chiriyo Chiri | Abdul Rasaq | |
| 1982 | Veedu | Sumi's father | |
| 1982 | Maattuvin Chattangale | | |
| 1982 | Mylanchi | Abdhurahman Haji | |
| 1982 | Komaram | | |
| 1982 | Akrosham | Kollakkaaran Ganga | |
| 1982 | Kazhumaram | | |
| 1982 | Ankachamayam | Robert | |
| 1982 | Mazhu | | |
| 1982 | Chambalkadu | | |
| 1982 | Padayottam | Mootha Marakkar | |
| 1982 | Innalenkil Nale | Gopalan Mash | |
| 1982 | Ee Nadu | Krishna Pillai | |
| 1983 | America America | Jackson | |
| 1983 | Nizhal Moodiya Nirangal | Thampi | |
| 1983 | Bandham | | |
| 1983 | Omanathinkal | | |
| 1983 | Varanmare Avashyamundu | Abdullakka | |
| 1983 | Nadi Muthal Nadi Vare | Chekutty | |
| 1983 | Samrambham | Raghavan | |
| 1983 | Thalam Thettiya Tharattu | Adv. Rajeshekharan | |
| 1983 | Kadamba | Keshavan | |
| 1983 | Justice Raja | Narendran/Nagendran | |
| 1983 | Asuran | | |
| 1983 | Visa | Abukka | |
| 1983 | Maniyara | Ansari | |
| 1983 | Thaavalam | Jayaram | |
| 1983 | Ee Yugam | Nair | |
| 1983 | Aadhipathyam | Menon | |
| 1983 | Prathijnja | Gopalan/KRG Panikkar | |
| 1983 | Kodumkattu | Raghavan | |
| 1983 | Thimingalam | Kuruppu | |
| 1983 | Ankam | Fr. John | |
| 1983 | Bookambam | Shakthi | |
| 1983 | Himam | Vaasu | |
| 1983 | Hello Madras Girl | | |
| 1983 | Passport | Chandrasenan | |
| 1983 | Paalam | | |
| 1983 | Mortuary | Narendran | |
| 1983 | Asthram | Stephen | |
| 1983 | Eettappuli | Shekharan | |
| 1983 | Iniyenkilum | Nambiar | |
| 1984 | Aalkkoottathil Thaniye | Madhavan | |
| 1984 | Koottinilamkili | Yousuf | |
| 1984 | Shabadham | Sekhara Pilla | |
| 1984 | Manasse Ninakku Mangalam | Doctor | |
| 1984 | Onnum Mindatha Bharya | Thampi | |
| 1984 | Nethavu | | |
| 1984 | Bullet | | |
| 1984 | Thacholi Thankappan | Keshu | |
| 1984 | Piriyilla Naam | | |
| 1984 | Koodu Thedunna Parava | Khader Kakka | |
| 1984 | Krishna Guruvayoorappa | Melpathur Narayana Bhattathiri | |
| 1984 | Ningalil Oru Sthree | Latha's father | |
| 1984 | Sapadham | Shekharan Pillai | |
| 1984 | Jeevitham | Ummer Haji | |
| 1984 | Manithali | Judgal Abu | |
| 1984 | Inakili | Kunjambu | |
| 1984 | Unaroo | Hakkim | |
| 1984 | Sree Krishna Parundu | Kunjambu | |
| 1984 | Vetta | | |
| 1984 | NH 47 | Thankappan | |
| 1984 | Mynakam | | |
| 1984 | Uyaragalil | SP Madhavan Kurup | |
| 1984 | Raajavembaala | Williams | |
| 1984 | Ivide Thudagunnu | M. S. Menon | |
| 1984 | Ulpathi | | |
| 1984 | Vellam | Bappu | |
| 1985 | Choodatha Pookkal | Moideen | |
| 1985 | Jeevante Jeevan | Thampi | |
| 1985 | Shathru | U. P. Menon | |
| 1985 | Sannaham | Prathapan | |
| 1985 | Vilichu Vilikettu | N. N. K. Nair | |
| 1985 | Arodum Parayaruthu | | |
| 1985 | Chillukottaram | | |
| 1985 | Angadikkappurathu | Khan Sayib | |
| 1985 | Revenge | | |
| 1985 | Pathamudhayam | Rahim | |
| 1985 | Chorakku Chora | Chellappan | |
| 1985 | Nullinovikkathe | | |
| 1985 | Uyarum Njan Nadake | Nambyar | |
| 1985 | Akkachide Kunjuvava | | |
| 1985 | Ottayan | Balu | |
| 1986 | Ithile Iniyum Varu | M. S. Nair | |
| 1986 | Karinagam | | |
| 1986 | Pidikittappulli | | |
| 1986 | Meenamasathile Sooryan | Police officer | |
| 1986 | Caberet Dancer | | |
| 1986 | Vartha | Forest Minister | |
| 1986 | Bharya Oru Manthri | Balakrishnan | |
| 1986 | Surabhee Yamangal | Mathews | |
| 1986 | Ashtabandham | Pisharody master | |
| 1986 | Kulambadikal | | |
| 1986 | T. P. Balagopalan M. A. | Father | |
| 1987 | Yagagni | Maran | |
| 1987 | Kaiyethum Doorathu | Vidwan Maraar | |
| 1987 | Bhoomiyile Rajakkanmar | Chief Minister | |
| 1987 | Adimakal Udamakal | Karunakaran Nambiar | |
| 1987 | Ithente Needhi | | |
| 1987 | Kilipattu | | |
| 1987 | Ithrayum Kalam | Kunjavummed Haji | |
| 1987 | Sarvakalasala | | |
| 1987 | Kalam Mari Katha Mari | Aliyarukunji | |
| 1987 | Naalkavala | Hamsa | |
| 1987 | Neeyallengil Njan | Divakaran | |
| 1987 | Ente Sonia | Thilak | |
| 1987 | Naradhan Keralathil | Ex M. P. Menon | |
| 1988 | 1921 | Beeran | |
| 1988 | Rahasyam Parama Rahasyam | | |
| 1988 | Aranyakam | Ravunni | |
| 1988 | Abkari | Chathunny | |
| 1988 | Theruvu Narthaki | | |
| 1988 | Kanakambaragal | | |
| 1988 | Ambalakkara Panjayath | | |
| 1988 | Puravrutham | Kanaran | |
| 1988 | Ore Thooval Pakshikal | | |
| 1988 | Janmasathru | Avarachan | |
| 1988 | Dhwani | Bahuleyan | |
| 1988 | Mukthi | P. K. Nambyar | |
| 1988 | Aryan | Muhammad | |
| 1989 | Oru Vadakkan Veeragatha | Kannappan Chekavar | |
| 1989 | Adhipan | Sukumaran Mashu | |
| 1989 | Vaynattathinu Nalladh Karpoora Thulasi | Potty Iyer/Wakrajilli Chettiyar/Delhi Duttan | |
| 1989 | Devadas | | |

==== 1990s ====
| Year | Title | Role | Notes |
|---|---|---|---|
| 1990 | Samrajyam | Chandy | |
| 1990 | Brahmarakshassu | Rudran Pillai | |
| 1990 | Midhya | Narayanan | |
| 1990 | Indrajaalam | Ayyappan Nair | |
| 1990 | Nammude Naadu | Maliyekkal Chacko | |
| 1990 | Thazhvaram | Kanaran | |
| 1990 | Gajakesariyogam | Narayanan Nambiar | |
| 1990 | Purappadu | Ravunni Nair | |
| 1990 | Appu | Abu | |
| 1990 | Nagarangalil Chennu Raparkam | Arumukham Chettiyar | |
| 1991 | Amaram | Pillaichan | |
| 1991 | Keli | Ramankutty Nair | |
| 1991 | Oru Prathyeka Ariyippu | Raghavan | |
| 1992 | Simhadhwani | | |
| 1992 | Kadavu | Beeran | |

=== Tamil ===
| Year | Title | Role | Notes |
|---|---|---|---|
| 1981 | Garjanai | | |
| 1983 | Sattam | | |
| 1984 | Neengal Kettavai | Stunt Master's friend | |
| 1985 | Mangamma Sabatham | | |
