= List of Malayalam films of 1984 =

The following is a list of Malayalam films released in the year 1984.

| Opening | | Sl. No. | Film | Cast | Director | Music director | Notes |
|---|---|---|---|---|---|---|---|
| J A N | 1 | 1 | Inakkily | Sasikala, Prem Nazir, Sukumaran | Joshi | Shyam | |
| J A N | 3 | 2 | Ente Upasana | Mammootty, Suhasini | Bharathan | Johnson | |
| J A N | 5 | 3 | Ente Kalithozhan | Shankar, Sabitha Anand | M. Mani | Shyam | |
| J A N | 12 | 4 | Oru Sumangaliyude Katha | Ratheesh, Seema, Ambika, Sukumaran | Baby | Shyam | |
| J A N | 16 | 5 | Radhayude Kamukan | Ratheesh, Rohini | Hassan | A. T. Ummer | |
| J A N | 26 | 6 | Kodathy | Mammootty, Ratheesh, Seema | Joshiy | Shyam | |
| F E B | 3 | 7 | Veruthe Oru Pinakkam | Nedumudi Venu, Poornima Jayaram | Sathyan Anthikkad | Raveendran | |
| F E B | 4 | 8 | Raajavembaala | Ratheesh, Kalaranjini | K. S. Gopalakrishnan | K. J. Joy | |
| F E B | 5 | 9 | Unaroo | Mohanlal, Ratheesh, Sukumaran | Mani Ratnam | Ilaiyaraaja | |
| F E B | 12 | 10 | Vepraalam | Rajkumar, Menaka | Menon Suresh | K. V. Mahadevan | |
| F E B | 13 | 11 | Nethavu | Srividya, Ratheesh | Hassan | A. T. Ummer | |
| F E B | 17 | 12 | Ethirppukal | Mammootty, Ratheesh, Shankar, Urvashi | Unni Aranmula | T. S. Radhakrishnan | |
| F E B | 17 | 13 | Veendum Chalikkunna Chakram | Mammootty, Shankar | P. G. Vishwambharan | Shyam | |
| F E B | 18 | 14 | Manithali | Prem Nazir, Mammootty | M. Krishnan Nair | A. T. Ummer | |
| F E B | 25 | 15 | Parannu Parannu Parannu | Rahman, Rohini | P. Padmarajan | Johnson | |
| F E B | 25 | 16 | Nishedhi | Sukumaran, Bheeman Raghu | K. S. Gopalakrishnan | K. J. Joy | |
| M A R | 2 | 17 | Kooduthedunna Parava | Ratheesh, Captain Raju | P. K. Joseph | A. T. Ummer | |
| M A R | 2 | 18 | Oru Kochu Swapnam | Mohanlal, Nedumudi Venu | Vipin Das | M. B. Sreenivasan | |
| M A R | 2 | 19 | Oru Kochukatha Aarum Parayatha Katha | Mammootty, Saritha | P. G. Vishwambharan | A. T. Ummer | |
| M A R | 4 | 20 | Swanthamevide Bandhamevide | Bharath Gopi, Nedumudi Venu | Sasikumar | Johnson | |
| M A R | 4 | 21 | Manasariyathe | Mohanlal, Nedumudi Venu | Soman Ambatt | Raghu Kumar | |
| M A R | 6 | 22 | Aalkkoottathil Thaniye | Mammootty, Seema | I. V. Sasi | Shyam | |
| M A R | 9 | 23 | Aksharangal | Mammootty, Bharath Gopi | I. V. Sasi | Shyam | |
| M A R | 16 | 24 | Velichamillatha Veedhi | Sukumari, Venu Nagavally | Jose Kallen | K. P. Udayabhanu | |
| M A R | 17 | 25 | Appunni | Nedumudi Venu, Menaka | Sathyan Anthikad | Kannur Rajan | |
| M A R | 17 | 26 | Poochakkoru Mookkuthi | Mohanlal, Shankar | Priyadarshan | M. G. Radhakrishnan | |
| M A R | 17 | 27 | Attahaasam | Sukumaran, Kalaranjini | K. S. Gopalakrishnan | M. G. Radhakrishnan | |
| M A R | 23 | 28 | Theere Pratheekshikkathe | Ratheesh, Captain Raju | P. Chandrakumar | A. T. Ummer | |
| M A R | 24 | 29 | Athirathram | Mammootty, Mohanlal | I. V. Sasi | M. S. Viswanathan | |
| M A R | 30 | 30 | Swarna Gopuram | Sukumari, Ratheesh | A. B. Ayyappan Nair | Johnson | |
| A P R | 4 | 32 | Umaanilayam | Shankar, Manochithra | Joshiy | Shyam | |
| A P R | 12 | 34 | Chakkarayumma | Madhu, Srividya | Sajan | Shyam | |
| A P R | 12 | 35 | April 18 | Balachandramenon, Shobhana | Balachandramenon | A. T. Ummer | |
| A P R | 12 | 36 | Onnum Mindatha Bharya | Mammootty, Jalaja | Balu Kiriyath | Raghu Kumar | |
| A P R | 14 | 37 | Krishna Guruvayoorappa | Prem Nazir, Srividya | N. P. Suresh | V. Dakshinamoorthy | |
| A P R | 18 | 38 | Amme Narayana | Prem Nazir, Srividya | N. P. Suresh | A. T. Ummer | |
| A P R | 21 | 39 | Adaminte Vaariyellu | Srividya, Mammootty | K. G. George | M. B. Srinivasan | |
| A P R | 22 | 40 | Vikatakavi | Prem Nazir, Mammootty | Hariharan | Radhan | |
| A P R | 28 | 41 | Aarorumariyathe | Madhu, Bharath Gopi | K. S. Sethumadhavan | Shyam | |
| M A Y | 4 | 42 | Aagraham | Menaka, Devan | Rajasenan | A. T. Ummer | |
| M A Y | 4 | 43 | Kaliyil Alpam Karyam | Mohanlal, Neelima | Sathyan Anthikad | Raveendran | |
| M A Y | 7 | 44 | Ningalil Oru Sthree | Prem Nazir, Lakshmi | A. B. Raj | G. Devarajan | |
| M A Y | 7 | 45 | Odaruthammava Aalariyam | Mukesh, Nedumudi Venu | Priyadarshan | M. G. Radhakrishnan | |
| M A Y | 11 | 46 | Sandarbham | Mammootty, Saritha | Joshiy | Johnson | |
| M A Y | 11 | 47 | Piriyilla Naam | Prem Nazir, Jose | Joshiy | K. V. Mahadevan | |
| M A Y | 19 | 48 | NH 47 | Jagathy Sreekumar, Jose | Baby | Shyam | |
| M A Y | 24 | 49 | Kilikkonjal | Mohanlal, Adoor Bhasi | V. Ashok Kumar | Darsan Raman | |
| M A Y | 25 | 50 | Paavam Poornima | Mohanlal, Mammootty | Balu Kiriyath | Raghu Kumar | |
| J U N | 1 | 51 | Lakshmana Rekha | Mohanlal, Mammootty | I. V. Sasi | A. T. Ummer | |
| J U N | 9 | 52 | Thathamme Poocha Poocha | Rajkumar, Suhasini | Balu Kiriyath | M. B. Sreenivasan | |
| J U N | 11 | 53 | Vanitha Police | Prem Nazir, Seema | Alleppey Ashraf | Gopan | |
| J U N | 15 | 54 | Aattuvanchi Ulanjappol | Madhu, Mammootty | Bhadran | Shyam | |
| J U N | 15 | 55 | Mynaakam | Sukumaran, Ratheesh | K. G. Rajasekharan | Raveendran | |
| J U N | 16 | 56 | Manasse Ninakku Mangalam | Prem Nazir, Madhu | A. B. Raj | Raveendran | |
| J U N | 22 | 57 | Mangalam Nerunnu | Nedumudi Venu, P. K. Abraham | Mohan | Ilaiyaraaja | |
| J U N | 22 | 58 | Kadamattathachan | Prem Nazir, Srividya | N. P. Suresh | A. T. Ummer | |
| J U N | 25 | 59 | Koottinilamkili | Sukumari, Mammootty | Sajan | Shyam | |
| J U N | 29 | 60 | Bullet | Ratheesh, Balan K. Nair | Crossbelt Mani | Guna Singh | |
| J U N | 29 | 61 | Unni Vanna Divasam | Sukumari, Sankaradi | Rajan Balakrishnan | A. T. Ummer | |
| J U L | 6 | 62 | Jeevitham | Shankar, Madhu | A. V. Meiyappan | R. Sudarsanam | |
| J U L | 6 | 63 | Thacholi Thankappan | Shubha, Sukumaran | P. Venu | Raveendran | |
| J U L | 10 | 64 | Aayiram Abhilashangal | Mammootty, Nedumudi Venu | Soman Ambat | A. T. Ummer | |
| J U L | 13 | 65 | Vetta | Mammootty, Mohanlal | Mohan Roop | M. G. Radhakrishnan | |
| J U L | 13 | 66 | Karimbu | Ratheesh, Menaka | K. Vijayan | Shyam | |
| J U L | 15 | 67 | Aashamsakalode | Shankar, Jalaja | Vijayan Karote | Raveendran | |
| J U L | 22 | 68 | Poomadhathe Pennu | Prem Nazir, Unnimary | Hariharan | G. Devarajan | |
| J U L | 27 | 69 | Kanamarayathu | Mammootty, Rahman | I. V. Sasi | Shyam | |
| A U G | 3 | 70 | Ivide Thudangunnu | Mohanlal, Rahman | J. Sasikumar | Johnson | |
| A U G | 3 | 71 | Ithiri Poove Chuvannapoove | Madhu, Mammootty | Bharathan | Raveendran | |
| A U G | 7 | 72 | Kudumbam Oru Swargam Bharya Oru Devatha | Sukumari, Sukumaran | N. Sankaran Nair | | |
| A U G | 11 | 73 | Paavam Krooran | Shankar, Madhuri | Rajasenan | A. T. Ummer | |
| A U G | 12 | 74 | Oru Nimisham Tharu | Jagathy Sreekumar, Thikkurissy Sukumaran Nair | N. P. Suresh | A. T. Ummer | |
| A U G | 17 | 75 | Idavelakku Sesham | Mammootty, Sumalatha | Joshiy | Raveendran | |
| A U G | 19 | 76 | Ente Nandinikutty | Prem Nazir, Kaviyoor Ponnamma | Valsan | Raveendran | |
| A U G | 24 | 77 | My Dear Kuttichathan | Kottarakkara Sreedharan Nair, Sonia | Jijo Punnoose | Ilaiyaraaja | |
| A U G | 30 | 78 | Anthichuvappu | Mammootty, Shankar | Kurian Varnasala | A. T. Ummer | |
| A U G | 31 | 79 | Thirakkil Alppa Samayam | Madhu, Mammootty | P. G. Vishwambharan | Shyam | |
| S E P | 4 | 80 | Oru Painkilikatha | Madhu, Srividya | Balachandra Menon | A. T. Ummer | |
| S E P | 6 | 81 | Muthodumuthu | Shankar, Menaka | M. Mani | Shyam | |
| S E P | 6 | 82 | Sreekrishna Parunthu | Mohanlal, Jagathy | A. Vincent | K. Raghavan | |
| S E P | 7 | 83 | Alakadalinakkare | Prem Nazir, Madhu | Joshiy | Gangai Amaran | |
| S E P | 13 | 84 | Ivide Ingane | Ratheesh, Sukumaran | Joshiy | Shyam | |
| S E P | 16 | 85 | Mukhamukham | Ashokan, P. Gangadharan Nair | Adoor Gopalakrishnan | M. B. Srinivasan | |
| S E P | 25 | 86 | Aduthaduthu | Rahman, Thilakan | Sathyan Anthikkad | Raveendran | |
| S E P | 28 | 87 | Panchavadi Palam | Gopi, Nedumudi Venu | K. G. George | M. B. Sreenivasan | |
| O C T | 8 | 88 | Kurishuyudham | Prem Nazir, Madhu | Baby | K. J. Joy | |
| O C T | 9 | 89 | Arante Mulla Kochu Mulla | Balachandra Menon, Shankar Panikkar | Balachandra Menon | Johnson | |
| O C T | 14 | 90 | Akkare | Nedumudi Venu, Bharath Gopi | K. N. Sasidharan | | |
| O C T | 20 | 91 | Shabadham | Srividya, Ratheesh | M. R. Joseph | Raveendran | |
| N O V | 3 | 92 | Sandyakkenthinu Sindhooram | Mammootty, Seema | P. G. Vishwambharan | Shyam | |
| N O V | 8 | 93 | Rakshassu | Baby, Sukumaran, Ratheesh | Hassan | A. T. Ummer | |
| N O V | 11 | 94 | Uyarangalil | Mohanlal, Rahman | I. V. Sasi | Shyam | |
| N O V | 15 | 95 | Minimol Vathicanil | Baby Shalini, Ratheesh | Joshiy | M. S. Viswanathan | |
| N O V | 21 | 96 | Makale Mappu Tharu | Prem Nazir, Ratheesh | J. Sasikumar | M. K. Arjunan | |
| N O V | 23 | 97 | Itha Innu Muthal | Shankar, Rani Padmini | T. S. Suresh Babu | Shyam | |
| N O V | 23 | 98 | Swantham Sarika | Venu Nagavally, Manochithra | Ambili | Kannur Rajan | |
| N O V | 23 | 99 | Ariyaatha Veethikal | Madhu, Mohanlal | K. S. Sethumadhavan | M. S. Viswanathan | |
| N O V | 28 | 100 | Thirakal | Seema, Mohanlal | K. Vijayan | Shankar–Ganesh | |
| D E C | 2 | 101 | Ulpathi | Prameela, Balan K. Nair | V. P. Mohammed | A. T. Ummer | |
| D E C | 7 | 102 | Enganeyundashaane | Mammootty, Menaka | Balu Kiriyath | Raveendran | |
| D E C | 7 | 103 | Kalki | Adoor Bhasi, Ambika | N. Sankaran Nair | G. Devarajan | |
| D E C | 9 | 104 | Ente Gramam | Sharada, Sreelatha Namboothiri | Sreemoolanagaram Vijayan | Vidyadharan | |
| D E C | 20 | 105 | Adiyozhukkukal | Mammootty, Mohanlal | I. V. Sasi | Shyam | |
| D E C | 22 | 106 | Oru Thettinte Katha | Prem Nazir, Srividya | P. K. Joseph | A. T. Ummer | |
| D E C | 26 | 107 | Onnanu Nammal | Mammootty, Mohanlal | P. G. Vishwambharan | Ilaiyaraaja | |
| | | | Sree Guruvayoor Mahathmyam | | | | |

== Dubbed films ==
| film | Direction | Story | Screenplay | Main Actors |
|---|---|---|---|---|
| Vasantholsavam | S. P. Muthuraman | | | Kamal Haasan |
| Niraparaadhi | K. Vijayan | | | Rajmohan, Madhavi |
| Sivaranjani | Dasari Narayana Rao | | | |
| Ettumuttal | K. S. Reddy | | | |
| Thadangal palayam | Somasekharan | | | |
| Chandragiri Kotta | R. S. Babu | | | |
| Sahachariyam | C. V. Rajendran | | | |
| Fifty Fifty | Vijay | | | |
| Circus Prapanjam | P. Narayana Rao | | | |
| Theerumanam | U. Vishweswar Rao | | | |
| Nadanum Bharyayum | Mallesh | | | |
| Theennal Thedunna Poovu | Rama Arakannal | | | Revathy, Rajkumar |
