= Manochithra =

Former Indian actress

- Occupation: Actress
- Years active: 1983–1992
- Parent(s): T. S. Balaiah, Navaneetham

Manochithra is a former Indian actress. She has appeared in Telugu, Tamil-language and Malayalam movies. She made her Malayalam debut with the movie Mazhanilavu in 1983 with Shanavas in the lead. She is the daughter of Tamil actor T. S. Balaiah and Navaneetham.

== Filmography ==
| Year | Film | Role | Language | Notes |
|---|---|---|---|---|
| 1982 | Thendraley Vaa | | Tamil | Unreleased film |
| 1982 | Maadhulai Muthukkal | | Tamil | Debut film |
| 1983 | Mazha Nilaavu | Poornima | Malayalam | |
| 1983 | Thimingalam | Reetha | Malayalam | |
| 1983 | Ee Vazhi Mathram | | Malayalam | |
| 1983 | Oru Odai Nadhiyagirathu | | Tamil | |
| 1984 | Oru Painkilikatha | | Malayalam | |
| 1984 | Swantham Sarika | Sarika | Malayalam | |
| 1984 | Umaanilayam | | Malayalam | |
| 1985 | Srivari Sobhanam | Margaret | Telugu | |
| 1985 | Guruji Oru Vakku | | Malayalam | |
| 1985 | Terror | Aruna | Telugu | |
| 1986 | Kirai Mogdu | Swapna | Telugu | |
| 1986 | Maa Vari Gola | | Telugu | |
| 1986 | Prema Jala | | Kannada | |
| 1988 | Varna Chakra | | Kannada | |
| 1989 | Annanukku Jai | | Tamil | Credited as Kruthika |
| 2001 | Asathal | | Tamil | |
| 2002 | Vivaramana Aalu | Parvathi | Tamil | |
| 2002 | Ivan | | Tamil | |
| 2003 | Vaseegara | Padma | Tamil | |
| 2003 | Jayam | | Tamil | |
| 2006 | Dharmapuri | Valarmathi's mother | Tamil | |
