= Krishna Guruvayoorappa =

- Directed by: N. P. Suresh
- Written by: Purushan Alappuzha; Alappuzha Karthikeyan (dialogues)
- Screenplay by: Alappuzha Karthikeyan
- Produced by: Purushan Alappuzha
- Starring: Prem Nazir; Srividya; Menaka; Unni Mary
- Cinematography: P. N. Sundaram
- Edited by: N. P. Suresh
- Music by: V. Dakshinamoorthy
- Production company: Sreedevi Arts Movies
- Distributed by: Sreedevi Arts Movies
- Release date: 14 April 1984
- Country: India
- Language: Malayalam

Krishna Guruvayoorappa is a 1984 Indian Malayalam-language film, directed by N. P. Suresh and produced by Purushan Alappuzha. The film stars Prem Nazir, Srividya, Menaka, and Unni Mary in the lead roles. The film has musical score by V. Dakshinamoorthy.

== Cast ==
- Prem Nazir as Poonthanam Nambudiri
- Srividya as Kururamma
- Shankar as Unni
- Menaka as Unni's wife
- Unni Mary as Savithri
- Baby Shalini as Unnikrishnan (Lord Krishna as child)
- Balan K. Nair as Melpathur Narayana Bhattathiri
- M. G. Soman as Vilwamangalam Swamiyar
- Sathyakala
- Shanavas
- Meena as Parvathi
- Nithya Ravindran as Bhama
- Ranipadmini as Charutha
- Rajkumar Sethupathi
- Kaduvakulam Antony
- Jagannatha Varma as Kunju Nair
- Cochin Haneefa as Pandya Rajan
- Hari as Namboothirishan
- Ravi Menon as Srikrishnan (Lord Krishna as adult)
- Seetha as Unni Namboothiri

== Soundtrack ==
The music was composed by V. Dakshinamoorthy and the lyrics were written by Koorkkancheri Sugathan.

No.	Song	Singers	Lyrics	Length (m:ss)
1	"Anjana Sreedhara"	P. Susheela		
2	"Ennunnikkanna"	Ambili	Koorkkancheri Sugathan	
3	"Jaya Jagadeesa" (Bit)			
4	"Kanna Kaarmukilolivarnna" (Ninthirunadayil)	Kalyani Menon	Koorkkancheri Sugathan	
5	"Karaaravinda" (Bit)	P. Jayachandran		
6	"Kasthoori Thilakam" (Bit)	K. J. Yesudas		
7	"Krishna" (Bhooloka Vaikuntavaasa)	K. J. Yesudas		
8	"Krishna Krishna Mukunda"	K. J. Yesudas		
9	"Minnum Ponnin Kireedam"	P. Susheela		
10	"Mookane Gaayakanaakkunna"	K. J. Yesudas	Koorkkancheri Sugathan	
11	"Naarayana Krishna"	Kalyani Menon	Koorkkancheri Sugathan	
12	"Raajaputhri" (Slokam)	K. J. Yesudas		
13	"Sankadaapahaa" (Bit)	Kalyani Menon		
14	"Thrikkaal Randum"	K. J. Yesudas	Koorkkancheri Sugathan	
15	"Yogeendraanaam"	K. J. Yesudas		
