= Kaliyil Alpam Karyam =

- Poster
- Directed by: Sathyan Anthikad
- Written by: Dr. Balakrishnan
- Produced by: Pavamani
- Starring: Mohanlal; Neelima (Bhuvana); Nedumudi Venu; Jagathy Sreekumar; Rahman; Lissy
- Cinematography: Anandakuttan
- Edited by: G. Venkittaraman
- Music by: Raveendran
- Production company: Prathap Chithra
- Distributed by: Sheeba Films
- Release date: 4 May 1984
- Country: India
- Language: Malayalam

Kaliyil Alpam Karyam is a 1984 Indian Malayalam-language film directed by Sathyan Anthikad, starring Mohanlal, Neelima, Rahman, Jagathy Sreekumar and Lissy in the lead roles. The film was shot in different parts of Ernakulam district. The village Manikulangara in the film was shot in various parts of Muvattupuzha.

== Plot ==
Vinayan an idealist hails from a rich family. He believes in Gandhian principles and living a simple life. He is enamored by the simple lifestyle of the people in Kerala's villages and the natural beauty of rural Kerala. He gets a job as a Village Development Officer and is transferred to a village where he takes a house on rent and lives a contended life. His landlords' daughter Radha falls in love with him, and he reciprocates the feeling. He looks at her as an ideal wife as she is a villager. His parents however have different plans. They want him to marry someone as rich as them. His brother Babu a young city boy, comes to visit him when he fails college. Vinayan also has a younger sister Kalpana.

Babu soon finds out about Vinayan and Radha and supports his brother's decision to marry Radha. Radha and Vinayan are soon wed. After the wedding, Raha expresses a desire to go to Ernakulam, Vinayan's hometown to see the place and his home. Vinayan is shocked at the city aspirations of his wife. He tries to discourage her, but Radha is adamant that she wants to go to Ernakulam. In the meantime, Vinayan's parents come to visit him and find out that he is married. They take him home forcibly and lock him up so that they can marry him off to a girl of their choice.

Radha's parents and Vinayan's brother Babu reach Vinayan's home and force them to take Radha as their daughter in law. Vinayan's mom decides to accept her so that they can later get rid of her. Radha soon discards her traditional clothes and wears modern dresses. This angers Vinayan who tells her that he married her because he thought she was a simple villager. Radha retorts that she married him because she thought he was a person from the city. She was tired of village life and the lack of amenities at the village. Vinayan leaves for the village while Radha stays back. Vinayan's mom takes her around and she becomes the butt of jokes due to her lack of social skills and knowledge of city life. Babu talks to her and urges her to go back to her husband. Humiliated by her mother in laws plans, Radha discards her modern clothes and goes back to Vinayan. Vinayan in the meantime regrets his actions and decides to get her back. They both meet on their way to meet each other and reunite.

== Cast ==
- Mohanlal as Vinayan a.k.a. Vinu, the Village Extension Officer
- Neelima (born Bhuvana) as Radha
- Bahadoor as Rarichan Nair, father of Radha
- Sankaradi as Sankaran Nair
- Meena as Lekshmi, mother of Radha
- Jagathy Sreekumar as Vasunni, cousin of Radha
- Rahman as Babu, brother of Vinayan
- K. P. Ummer as R. Viswanathan Nair, Vinayan's father
- Sukumari as Leela, Vinayan's mother
- Lissy as Kalpana, Vinayan's sister
- Nedumudi Venu as a drunk neighbour
- Mala Aravindan as Shankarankutty, the driver
- Thrissur Elsy
- Master Aravind / M. P. Ramnath
- Kunchan as Kochukuttan, Vasunni's friend

== Soundtrack ==
The music was composed by Raveendran and the lyrics were written by Sathyan Anthikad.

No.	Song	Singers	Lyrics	Length (m:ss)
1	"Disco Disco"	K. S. Chithra, Raveendran	Sathyan Anthikad	
2	"Kannodu Kannaaya Swapnangal"	K. J. Yesudas, K. S. Chithra	Sathyan Anthikad	
3	"Manathaaril Ennum"	K. J. Yesudas	Sathyan Anthikad	
4	"Pattanathilennum"	K. S. Chithra, Chorus	Sathyan Anthikad	
