= Ashtapadi (film) =

- Directed by: Ambili
- Written by: Perumbadavam Sreedharan
- Starring: Menaka; Devan; Sukumari; Adoor Bhasi
- Cinematography: N. Karthikeyan
- Edited by: M. V. Natarajan
- Music by: Vidyadharan
- Production company: Ambal Films
- Distributed by: Ambal Films
- Release date: 14 October 1983
- Country: India
- Language: Malayalam

Ashtapadi is a 1983 Indian Malayalam film directed by Ambili and written by Perumbadavam Sreedharan based on his own novel of the same name. The film stars Menaka, Devan, Sukumari and Adoor Bhasi in the lead roles. The film has musical score by Vidyadharan.

Perumbadavam Sreedharan won the Kerala Film Critics Association Award for Best Story for the film. Babu Namboothiri won the Kerala Film Critics Association Award for Second Best Actor.

== Cast ==
- Menaka
- Devan
- Sukumari
- Adoor Bhasi
- Bharath Gopi
- Babu Namboothiri
- Ravi Menon

== Soundtrack ==
The music was composed by Vidyadharan and the lyrics were written by P. Bhaskaran.

No.	Song	Singers	Lyrics	Length (m:ss)
1	"Chandana Charchitha"	Kavalam Sreekumar		
2	"Gopa Kadamba Nithambam"	K. J. Yesudas		
3	"Maanava Hridayathin"	K. J. Yesudas	P. Bhaskaran	
4	"Manjuthara"			
5	"Pandu Pandoru Kaalathu"	Sujatha Mohan	P. Bhaskaran	
6	"Vinninte Virimaaril"	K. J. Yesudas	P. Bhaskaran	
