= Ambili =

Ambili may refer to:

- Ambili (film), a 2019 Indian Malayalam-language comedy drama film
- Ambili (singer), Indian film singer in Malayalam cinema
- Ambili (director), Indian film director, art director, and artist
