= Shivaji (Malayalam actor) =

Indian actor

- Born: 12 May 1957
- Died: 30 September 2004 (aged 47)
- Occupation: Film actor
- Years active: 1982–2004
- Spouse: Jayasree
- Children: Unnimaya
- Parent(s): A.K. Warrier, Kamala Varasyar

Shivaji (12 May 1957 - 30 September 2004) was an Indian actor, most popular for his Malayalam films during the 1980s and 1990s. He mainly did villain roles.

== Background ==
Shivaji was born at Sankaramangalam Pattambi, Palakkad as the fourth child of (both late) Dr. A.K. Warrier (Panjal Ayyappankavu Variam) and Kamalam Varasyar (Manissery Thekkeppattu Variam). His debut movie was Kaaliyamarddanam in 1982. He did many notable roles in TV dramas and soap operas. He acted in more than 100 films. He died on 30 September 2004 following cardiac arrest at Thiruvananthapuram. He is survived by his daughter Unnimaya, his mother (who died on 9 August 2010) and his wife (who died in 2017).

== Filmography ==
=== 1980s ===
Year	Title	Role	Notes
1982	Kaaliya Mardhanam	Venus Raju	
1982	Enikkum Oru Divasam	Salim	
1982	Irattimadhuram	Balan	
1985	Nayakan	Shivaji	
1985	Archana Aaradhana	Ramakrishnan	
1985	Nulli Novikkathe		
1985	Akalathe Ambili	Thomas Kariya	
1985	Ee Sabdam Innathe Sabdam	Chandru	
1985	Thozhil Allengil Jail		
1986	Ilanjippookkal		
1986	Hello My Dear Wrong Number	Jayan	
1987	Swargam		
1987	Kaanan Kothichu		
1988	Mukthi		
1989	Peruvannapurathe Visheshangal	Kurup	
1989	Agnipravesham		
1989	Pooram		
1989	Aazhikkoru Muthu		

=== 1990s ===
Year	Title	Role	Notes
1990	Randam Varavu	SI Daniel	
1990	Mukham	CI Narayana Swamy	
1990	Vachanam		
1990	Cheriya Lokavum Valiya Manushyarum	Sunny	
1991	Kakkathollayiram		
1991	Koodikazhcha	Gopinatha Panikkar	
1991	Neelagiri	Ani's father	
1991	Mimics Parade	Frederick Cherian	
1991	Kuttapathram	SI Aravindan	
1992	Mahanagaram		
1992	Kaazhchakkappuram		
1992	Radhachakram		
1992	Aardram	Padmanabhan	
1992	Gouri		
1993	Kalippattam	Chandran	
1993	Kanyakumariyil Oru Kavitha		
1993	Samooham	Doctor Chandran Menon	
1993	Chenkol	Diwakaran	
1993	Aagneyam	Krishnadas	
1993	Thalamura	Velappan	
1994	Paavam IA Ivachan		
1994	Bhaarya		
1994	Sukrutham		
1994	Vendor Daniel State Licency	SI Abdullah	
1995	Maanthrikante Praavukal		
1995	Arabikkadaloram		
1995	Kalyanji Anandji	Seetharaman	
1996	Kalyana Sougandhikam	Bhargavan	
1996	Sulthan Hyderali	Thompsonkunju	
1996	Rajaputhran	Ex-Minister Thomas Kurian	
1996	Hitlist		
1997	Mayaponman	Cheriyammavan	
1997	Kalyaana Unnikal		
1997	Kilukil Pambaram	Nandana Varma	
1997	Niyogam		
1997	Janathipathyam	Thirumulpadu	
1998	Sooryavanam	DIG Vinod Kumar	
1998	Ennu Swantham Janakikutty		
1999	Aakasha Ganga	Panicker	
1999	Indulekha		
1999	Varum Varathirikkilla Unni	Unni's father	
1999	Stalin Sivadas	Thankachan	
1999	Pallavur Devanarayanan	Chandrabhanu	

=== 2000s ===
Year	Title	Role	Notes
2000	Susanna		
2000	Thottam		
2000	Dada Sahib	Dr. John	
2001	Naranathu Thampuran	Chakochan	
2001	Meghamalhar	Santhosh	
2001	Sraavu		
2002	Kattuchembakam	IG Vishwanathan	
2003	Nizhalkuthu		
2003	Manassinakkare		
2004	Perumazhakkalam	Vishnu	
2004	Govindankutty Thirakkilaanu	Veerabhadra Kuruppu	
2004	Kadhavaseshan		
2004	Vajram	Thorappan Avaran	
2004	Thudakkam		

== Television ==
- Chila Kudumba Chithrangal (Kairali TV)
