= Annanukku Jai =

Annanukku Jai may refer to:

- Annanukku Jai (1989 film), an Indian Tamil-language film
- Annanukku Jai (2018 film), a Tamil-language political satire film
