= Oru Sankeerthanam Pole =

Book by Perumbadavam Sreedharan

- 46th edition cover (March 2011)
- Author: Perumbadavam Sreedharan
- Cover artist: T.A.Joseph
- Language: Malayalam
- Genre: Novel
- Publisher: Ashramam Bhasi, Sankeerthanam Publications, Kollam
- Publication date: September 1993
- Publication place: India
- Pages: 223
- ISBN: 978-812400354-1

Oru Sankeerthanam Pole (transl. Like a Psalm) is a 1993 Malayalam novel written by Indian novelist and writer Perumbadavam Sreedharan. Set in the city of Saint Petersburg, it deals with the life of the Russian author Fyodor Dostoyevsky and his love affair with Anna Grigoryevna Snitkina who would later become his wife. First published in September 1993, it broke Malayalam publishing records in 2005 by selling more than 100,000 copies in just 12 years after its initial publication. It won numerous awards, the most prestigious one being the 1996 Vayalar award. The book surpassed its 100th edition with more than 200,000 copies in about 24 years. As of March 2019, 108 editions of this novel have been published. Excerpts from the novel are part of Malayalam school and college curricula.

== Plot ==
The novel revolves around the life of Dostoyevsky from the time of his meeting with Anna till their union. Dostoyevsky had promised his editor Stellovsky that he would complete the novel The Gambler within a few months, but he had not yet written a single page. On the advice of a friend, he recruits a stenographer, Anna, to speed up the completion. Anna had great respect for the novelist. But he was nothing like she imagined. On the surface, Dostoyevsky was an alcoholic, gambler, and epileptic who could evoke revulsion in anyone. But Anna slowly discovers deeper characteristics in his personality which slowly progresses into the emotion of love.

The novel delves deep into Dostoyevsky's mind and exposes his loneliness, weaknesses, pain, and spiritual agony. His own emotions of being a gambler and alcoholic are portrayed in his novel The Gambler. The string of failed relationships, poverty, and diseases haunt him. The presence of Anna gives him great relief. In the end, he communicates his love to her, and they decide to be together.

== Writing ==
Perumbadavam Sreedharan, in his introduction to the book, thanks Anna's memoirs for giving inputs for the theme of the book. The details of the life and personality of Dostoyevsky were derived from his various novels and biographies.

Unlike other biographers of Dostoyevsky, Perumbadavam does not crucify him for his weaknesses and manias. In the introduction to the book in a reprint in 2006, he says that the agonies that life gave Dostoyevsky purified him into a saint. He argues that only a saint could have produced such great works as Crime and Punishment, The Idiot and The Brothers Karamazov. Dostoyevsky's epileptic seizures, gambling mania, and alcoholism are not considered mere weaknesses of his heart, but symbols of creative agony and internal conflicts of a great writer.

== Characters ==
- Fyodor Dostoyevsky - Russian author
- Anna Grigoryevna Snitkina - Dostoyevsky's stenographer
- Fedosya - Dostoyevsky's elderly maid
- Gregory Yakov - Old man who lends money for gambling
- Stellovsky - Cruel publisher of Dostoyevsky's books
- Alonkin - House owner
- Polina Suslova - Earlier lover of Dostoyevsky
- Pasha - Dostoyevsky's stepson
- Ivan - Young man who wishes to marry Anna
- Olkhin - Principle of stenography school

== Publication ==
The book was first published in September 1993. It sold more than 50,000 copies in the first six years and more than 100,000 copies in the first 12 years. The latter feat was celebrated at Thiruvananthapuram on August 3, 2005.

== Translations ==
The novel was translated into English by A. J. Thomas as Like a Psalm. It has also been translated to Hindi and foreign languages, like Arabic.

== Adaptation ==
It was adapted into a 2016 Indian film, titled In Return: Just a Book, by Shiny Benjamin with a screenplay by Paul Zacharia. It stars Russian actors Vladimir Postnikov as Dostoyevsky and Oksana Karmishina as his wife, Anna.
