= Scene No. 7 =

- Poster
- Directed by: Ambili
- Written by: Ambili
- Screenplay by: Ambili
- Produced by: V. Rajan
- Starring: Thilakan; Ashokan; Bharath Gopi; Shankar
- Cinematography: Vipin Mohan
- Music by: Jerry Amaldev
- Production company: Gireesh Pictures
- Distributed by: Gireesh Pictures and chalachitra
- Release date: 2 July 1985
- Country: India
- Language: Malayalam

Scene No. 7 is a 1985 Indian Malayalam-language film, directed by Ambili and produced by V. Rajan. The film stars Thilakan, Ashokan, Bharath Gopi and Shankar in the lead roles. The film has musical score by Jerry Amaldev.

== Cast ==
- Thilakan as Swami
- Ashokan as Maniyan
- Bharath Gopi as Menon
- Shankar as Jayan, Krishnanunni (double role)
- Aruna as Nandini
- Sabitha Anand as Ammini
- Sukumari as Thathri
- Innocent as Bhaskara Menon
- M. S. Warrier
- Mala Aravindan as Pankan Pilla
- T. G. Ravi as Sankaran
- Sreenath as Sub Inspector

== Soundtrack ==
The music was composed by Jerry Amaldev and the lyrics were written by P. Bhaskaran.

No.	Song	Singers	Lyrics	Length (m:ss)
1	"Kaalil Kanakamanjeeram"	K. J. Yesudas, K. S. Chithra, Chorus	P. Bhaskaran	
