= Himam =

- Poster
- Directed by: Joshiy
- Written by: T. Damodaran
- Starring: Prem Nazir; Shankar; Shanavas; Sripriya
- Music by: Shyam
- Production company: Hemnag Films
- Distributed by: Hemnag Films
- Release date: 18 February 1983
- Country: India
- Language: Malayalam

Himam (transl. Snow) is a 1983 Indian Malayalam-language masala film, directed by Joshiy. The film stars Prem Nazir, Shankar, Shanavas and Sripriya. The film has musical score by Shyam. The movie is a remake of the 1973 Hindi-language film Yaadon Ki Baaraat.

The story revolves around a man who is separated from and later reunites with his sons.

== Plot ==
Prasad, a middle-class man, lived with his wife, Ammu and sons, Vijay and Renji. Ammu had taught her sons, a song called "Gomedakam" (which means "onyx"). They lead a happy life until one day, Ammu is killed by two goons, led by the crime lord. Prasad manages to escape with his sons, however, the three are separated. As time passes, Prasad becomes a criminal, who is still haunted by the murder of his wife. He vows to find his sons Vijay and Renji and avenge his wife's death.

Vijay is a photographer while Renji does gigs to make a living. Vijay meets Sunita, though they initially dislike each other, they fall in love. Renji falls for his co-singer Indu. Soon, the brothers find each other. Prasad realises that Vijay and Renji are his sons but can't contact them. In the end, Prasad kills the villain and reunites with his sons.

== Cast ==
- Prem Nazir as Prasad
- Shankar as Vijay
- Shanavas as Renji
- Sripriya as Sunita
- Sumalatha as Indu
- Manjula Vijayakumar as Ammu
- Kundara Johny as Gireesh
- Balan K. Nair as Vasu
- P. R. Varalakshmi as Sharada
- Jose Prakash as Jayakanth
- Cochin Haneefa as Ameer Khan
- Anuradha as Dancer
- Prathapachandran as Madhavan
- P. K. Abraham as Varma
- Thodupuzha Radhakrishnan as Menon

== Soundtrack ==
The music was composed by Shyam and the lyrics were written by Bichu Thirumala and Mankombu Gopalakrishnan.

No.	Song	Singers	Lyrics	Length (m:ss)
1	"Gomedakam"	K. J. Yesudas, P. Jayachandran	Bichu Thirumala	
2	"Gomedakam"	K. J. Yesudas, S. Janaki	Bichu Thirumala	
3	"Gomedakam" (long version)	S. Janaki, S. P. Balasubrahmanyam, Chorus, Jolly Abraham	Bichu Thirumala	
4	"Lilli Pookkalaadum"	S. Janaki, P. Jayachandran	Bichu Thirumala	
5	"Nin Janmanaal"	K. J. Yesudas	Bichu Thirumala	
6	"Paaduvathenthe"	P. Jayachandran, A. V. Ramanan	Bichu Thirumala	
7	"Raagavathi Priya"	S. Janaki, Unni Menon	Mankombu Gopalakrishnan	
8	"Venpanineer Kanangal"	K. J. Yesudas	Bichu Thirumala	
