= Ee Yugam =

- Directed by: N. P. Suresh
- Written by: Purushan Alappuzha; Alappuzha Karthikeyan (dialogues)
- Screenplay by: Alappuzha Karthikeyan
- Produced by: Purushan Alappuzha
- Starring: Prem Nazir; Srividya; Hari; Rohini
- Cinematography: Rajan
- Edited by: N. P. Suresh
- Music by: A. T. Ummer
- Production company: Sreedevi Movies
- Distributed by: Sreedevi Movies
- Release date: 4 November 1983
- Country: India
- Language: Malayalam

Ee Yugam is a 1983 Indian Malayalam film, directed by N. P. Suresh and produced by Purushan Alappuzha. The film stars Prem Nazir, Srividya, Hari and Rohini in the lead roles. The film has musical score by A. T. Ummer.

== Cast ==
- Prem Nazir as Dr. Prasad
- Srividya as Aparna
- Hari
- Rohini
- Kalaranjini
- Sukumaran as Soman
- Balan K. Nair as Nair
- Janardanan
- Cochin Haneefa
- Kundara Johnny as Vaasu
- M. G. Soman as sukumaran
- Mala Aravindan
- Meena as Lakshmi
- Ranipadmini as Madhavi
- Sabitha Anand
- Sathyakala as Prema
- Shanavas as Prasad
- Usharani as Ammu
- Lalithasree
- Kaduvakulam Antony as Pappan
- P.K Radadevi
- Nithya as Geetha
- Rajashekharan as Mathew

== Soundtrack ==
The music was composed by A. T. Ummer and the lyrics were written by Koorkkancheri Sugathan and Poovachal Khader.

No.	Song	Singers	Lyrics	Length (m:ss)
1	"Kanna Nin Kilikkonchal" (Bit)	S. Janaki	Poovachal Khader, Koorkkancheri Sugathan	
2	"Maanathin Manimuttathu"	S. Janaki, Jolly Abraham	Poovachal Khader	
3	"Manjaadikutti Malavedathi"	Krishnachandran	Poovachal Khader	
