= N. P. Suresh =

Malayalam film editor and director

- Born: Thiruvananthapuram
- Occupation: director
- Years active: 1981–2000

N. P. Suresh is a Malayalam film editor and director. He has edited around 45 movies and directed more than 16 movies. He debuted with the movie Ithaa Oru Dhikkaari in 1981. He won Kerala State Film Award for Best Editor in the year 1982 for the movies Ormakaai and Marmaram.

== Partial filmography ==
As director:-

- Ithaa Oru Dhikkaari (1981)
- Agniyudham (1981)
- Sree Ayyappanum Vaavarum (1982)
- Ivan Oru Simham (1982)
- Ee Yugam (1983)
- Amme Naaraayana (1984)
- Oru Nimisham Tharoo (1984)
- Kadamattathachan (1984)
- Krishna Guruvaayoorappa (1984)
- Uyarthezhunelpu (1985)
- Onathumbikkoroonjal (1985)
- Prabhatham Chuvanna Theruvil (1989)
- Avalkkoru janmam koodi (1990)
- Ente Tuition Teacher (1992)
- Avalude Janmam (1994)
- Fashion Girls (2000)
