= Prema Geethangal =

- Directed by: Balachandra Menon
- Written by: Balachandra Menon
- Screenplay by: Balachandra Menon
- Starring: Ambika; Shanavas; Nedumudi Venu; Jose Prakash
- Cinematography: Vipin Mohan
- Edited by: G. Venkittaraman
- Music by: Johnson
- Production company: Mithra Films
- Distributed by: Mithra Films
- Release date: 21 August 1981
- Country: India
- Language: Malayalam

Prema Geethangal is a 1981 Indian Malayalam-language film, directed and written by Balachandra Menon. The film stars Ambika, Shanavas, Nedumudi Venu and Jose Prakash. The film's score was composed by Johnson.

== Cast ==
- Ambika as Geetha
- Shanavas as Ajith
- Nedumudi Venu
- Jose Prakash
- Sankaradi
- Alleppey Ashraf
- P. R. Menon

Elsy as Ambika's mother

Oduvil Unnikrishnan as astrologer

== Soundtrack ==
The music was composed by Johnson. All songs became mega hits. At that time, these songs were the most requested by music lovers from All India Radio. All these songs were the choices of Music troops (Gana Mela) artists.

No.	Song	Singers	Lyrics	Length (m:ss)
1	"Kala Kala Mozhi"	P. Susheela, J. M. Raju	Subash Chandran	
2	"Muthum Mudipponnum"	K. J. Yesudas, Vani Jairam	Devadas	
3	"Nee Nirayoo Jeevanil Pulakamaay"	K. J. Yesudas	Devadas	
4	"Swapnam Verumoru Swapnam"	K. J. Yesudas, S. Janaki	Devadas	
