= Agni Yudham =

- Directed by: N. P. Suresh
- Written by: Purushan Alappuzha; Alappuzha Karthikeyan (dialogues)
- Screenplay by: Alappuzha Karthikeyan
- Produced by: Purushan Alappuzha
- Starring: Jayabharathi; Jagathy Sreekumar; Jose Prakash; Sukumaran
- Cinematography: P. N. Sundaram
- Edited by: N. P. Suresh
- Music by: A. T. Ummer
- Production company: Sreedevi Movies
- Distributed by: Sreedevi Movies
- Release date: 24 July 1981
- Country: India
- Language: Malayalam

Agni Yudham is a 1981 Indian Malayalam film directed by N. P. Suresh and produced by Purushan Alappuzha. The film stars Jayabharathi, Jagathy Sreekumar, Jose Prakash, and Sukumaran. The film features musical score by A. T. Ummer.

== Cast ==
- Jayabharathi
- Jagathy Sreekumar
- Jose Prakash
- Sukumaran
- M. G. Soman
