= Sooryavanam =

- Directed by: Rishikesh
- Produced by: K. K. Mohanan
- Starring: Shankar; Captain Raju; Jagathy Sreekumar; Salim Kumar; Madhupal; Riza Bava
- Music by: Sharreth
- Release date: 25 December 1998
- Country: India
- Language: Malayalam

Sooryavanam is a 1998 Indian Malayalam-language film directed by Rishikesh, starring Shankar in his comeback film.

== Plot ==
Sooryavanam is the story of a commando along with his two friends who sets a journey into Sooryavanam, a dense and dangerous forest to save hostages from terrorists. On route they wanted help in tracking routes in forest so the invite one if their colleague to help them out. The rest of film revolves around the how these people tackle the terrorists.

== Cast ==
- Shankar as Ajith
- Captain Raju as Marshall
- Jagathy Sreekumar as Director Premchand
- Salim Kumar as Thamarathoppu
- Madhupal as Syam
- Riza Bava as Terrorist Gurudas
- Abu Salim as Akram
- Machan Varghese as Sathyasheelan
- Subair as Jerry
- Anil Murali as Forest Officer
- Suvarna Mathew as Maya
- Kalabhavan Narayanankutty as Neelambharan
- Shivaji as DIG Vinod Kumar
- Chali Pala as Vikraman
- Vettoor Purushan as Chindan
- Sooraj as Kaali
- Kollam Shah as Police Officer
- P. A. M. Rasheed as Home Minister
- Roopika
- Nikhila
- Dayana
- Bhuvanasree
- Akshara
- Ahana
- Salim Bava
- Sajan as Konkan
