= Ivan Oru Simham =

- Directed by: N. P. Suresh
- Written by: Alappuzha Karthikeyan; Purushan Alappuzha (dialogues)
- Screenplay by: Purushan Alappuzha
- Produced by: Purushan Alappuzha
- Starring: Prem Nazir; Srividya; Sukumaran; MG Soman
- Cinematography: J. Williams
- Edited by: N. P. Suresh
- Music by: A. T. Ummer
- Production company: Sreedevi Movies
- Distributed by: Sreedevi Movies
- Release date: 8 April 1982
- Country: India
- Language: Malayalam

Ivan Oru Simham is a 1982 Indian Malayalam film, directed by N. P. Suresh and produced by Purushan Alappuzha. The film stars Prem Nazir, Srividya, Sukumaran and M. G. Soman in the lead roles. The film has musical score by A. T. Ummer.

== Cast ==
- Prem Nazir Babu Suresh
- Srividya as Lakshmi
- Sukumaran as Gopi
- Prathapachandran
- M. G. Soman as Peter
- Cochin Haneefa as Joseph
- Meena
- Balan K. Nair as S K
- Reena as Omana
- Shanavas as Prabha
- Sumithra
- Mala Aravindan
- Janardhanan as Appu
- Kaduvakulam Antony as Pachupilla
- Swapna as Swapna

== Soundtrack ==
The music was composed by A. T. Ummer and the lyrics were written by Poovachal Khader.

No.	Song	Singers	Lyrics	Length (m:ss)
1	"Kanmani Pookkaniyaay"	S. Janaki	Poovachal Khader	
2	"Kanmani Pookkaniyaay" (Pathos)	S. Janaki	Poovachal Khader	
3	"Radhike Nin Raasa Nadanam"	K. J. Yesudas	Poovachal Khader	
