= Archana Aaradhana =

1985 film

- Directed by: Sajan
- Written by: K. T. Muhammed
- Screenplay by: K. T. Muhammed
- Starring: Shankar; Menaka; Ambika; Sukumari
- Cinematography: C. E. Babu
- Edited by: V. P. Krishnan
- Music by: Shyam
- Production company: BG's
- Distributed by: BG's
- Release date: 24 August 1985
- Country: India
- Language: Malayalam

Archana Aaradhana is a 1985 Indian Malayalam-language film, directed Sajan. The film stars Shankar, Menaka, Ambika and Sukumari. The film has musical score by Shyam. It is a remake of the 1985 Hindi film Bahu Ki Awaaz.

== Cast ==
- Shankar as Vimal Kumar
- Menaka as Aradhana
- Ambika as Archana
- Sukumari as Soumini
- Innocent as Kurupu
- Beena Sabu as Mallika
- Jose Prakash as Adv Gopinatha menon
- Sankaradi as Shivashankaran Nair
- Bharath Gopi as Adv Rajendran
- James
- Jagannatha Varma as Judge
- Paravoor Bharathan as Vimal's father
- Shivaji as Ramakrishnan
- Baby Soumya as Ammini

== Soundtrack ==
The music was composed by Shyam and the lyrics were written by Poovachal Khader.

No.	Song	Singers	Lyrics	Length (m:ss)
1	"Sangama Mangala Manthravumaayi"	Vani Jairam, Unni Menon	Poovachal Khader	
