= Oothikachiya Ponnu =

- Directed by: P. K. Joseph
- Screenplay by: V. K. Pavithran
- Story by: John Alunkal
- Starring: Poornima Jayaram; Shankar; Mammootty; Mohanlal
- Cinematography: B. R. Ramakrishna
- Edited by: K. Sankunni
- Music by: M. K. Arjunan
- Production company: Shanmugha Priya Films
- Distributed by: Vijaya & Vijaya
- Release date: 11 December 1981
- Running time: 129 minutes
- Country: India
- Language: Malayalam

Oothikachiya Ponnu (lit. 'Blown-seethed gold') is 1981 Indian Malayalam-language film directed by P. K. Joseph and written by V. K. Pavithran. The film features Shanker and Poornima Jayaram after Manjil Virinja Pookkal (1980); it also features Mammootty.

== Plot ==
A poor young woman must succeed in her dream as a saleswoman.

== Cast ==
- Poornima Jayaram as Sukumari
- Shankar as Vishwanathan
- K. P. Ummer as Mathachan
- Mammootty as John Kutty
- Mohanlal as Nandan
- Santhakumari as Sukumari's mother
- Sreenath as Dr. Samuel
- Nellikode Bhaskaran as Sukumari's father
- Roja Ramani as Shalini
- Jagathi Sreekumar as Vasu
- Indrapani
- Master Kumar
- Suchitra

== Soundtrack ==
The music was composed by M. K. Arjunan with lyrics by Poovachal Khader.

No.	Song	Singers	Lyrics	Length (m:ss)
1	"Amritha Kalayaayi Nee"	K. J. Yesudas	Poovachal Khader	
2	"Ee Raavil Ninte Kaamukiyaavaam"	S. Janaki	Poovachal Khader	
3	"Etho Oru Vazhiyil"	K. J. Yesudas	Poovachal Khader	
4	Theme Music			
