= Aasha (1982 film) =

- Directed by: Augustine Prakash
- Starring: Kalaranjini; Shanavas; Raveendran; Adoor Bhasi
- Music by: A. T. Ummer
- Release date: 21 October 1982
- Country: India
- Language: Malayalam

Aasha is a 1982 Indian Malayalam film, directed by Augustine Prakash. The film stars Kalaranjini, Shanavas, Raveendran and Adoor Bhasi in the lead roles. The film has musical score by A. T. Ummer.

== Cast ==
- Kalaranjini as Aasha
- Shanavas as Boban
- Raveendran as Kabir Mohemmed
- Adoor Bhasi as Willy
- Maniyanpilla Raju as Sunil Kumar
- Rajkumar as Lal
- Ranipadmini as Neena Cheriyan
- Manavalan Joseph as Parameshwara Iyyer Swami
- Sabitha Anand as Rasiya
- Jose Prakash as Mathew Cheriyan
- Lalu Alex as Doctor
- P. R. Menon

== Soundtrack ==
The music was composed by A. T. Ummer and the lyrics were written by Dr. Pavithran.

No.	Song	Singers	Lyrics	Length (m:ss)
1	"Aashe Aare Chaare"	K. J. Yesudas, Chorus	Dr. Pavithran	
2	"Aashe Aare Chaare" (sad)	K. J. Yesudas	Dr. Pavithran	
3	"Enikkaay Nee Janichu"	K. J. Yesudas	Dr. Pavithran	
4	"Marubhoomiyile"	K. J. Yesudas	Dr. Pavithran	
