= Ilanjippookkal =

- Directed by: Sandhya Mohan
- Written by: Ignetius Kalayanthani
- Screenplay by: Ignetius Kalayanthani
- Starring: Ratheesh; Shankar; Mukesh; Sandhya; Rajalakshmi; Lissy; Shivaji; Innocent
- Cinematography: Saroj Padi
- Edited by: V. P. Krishnan
- Music by: Kannur Rajan
- Production companies: Pushpa & Pushpa
- Distributed by: Pushpa & Pushpa
- Release date: 5 December 1986
- Country: India
- Language: Malayalam

Ilanjippookkal is a 1986 Indian Malayalam-language film, directed by Sandhya Mohan. The film stars Ratheesh.Mukesh, Sandhya. The film has musical score by Kannur Rajan.

== Cast ==
- Ratheesh as Balachandran
- Shankar as Satheesh
- Mukesh as Rajendran
- Sandhya
- Innocent
- Rajalakshmi
- Lissy
- Achankunju
- Master Vimal
- Santhakumari
- Shivaji
- Soorya as Sasikala
- Thodupuzha Vasanthi

== Plot ==
Sumithra (Sandhya) is a schoolteacher and she is blackmailed by Sukumaran (Shivaji) who took obscene pictures of Sumithra during her college youth festival. Sukumaran was her senior during college days. Sukumaran is now married and has a wife (Rajalakshmi) and child. Sumithra is engaged to Rajendran (Mukesh) and she is compelled by Sukumaran to spend a night with him, in his house, threatened with her pictures being shown to Rajendran and others. On the night when she was supposed to meet Sukumaran, he gets killed and police arrests his wife and later Sumitra is also arrested since her towel is found in a blood pool at the victims house. Rajendran takes her out on bail. When she comes back to her native, she finds the lifeless body of her mother (Santhakumari) who was in an unconscious state after knowing the arrest of Sumitra.Rajendran and Sumitra part ways as he suspects Sumitra in the murder. Balan (Ratheesh) a film writer occupies the house in the neighborhood of Sumitra and tries to become friendly with Sumitra and her brother. In the meantime, Rajendran proposes to Sasikala (Surya) who is the childhood friend of Sumitra. Sumitra faints by reading a letter sent by Rajendran informing his marriage and Balan comes to the rescue. Rajendran Sasikala marriage ran into rough weather on the night of marriage itself. Meanwhile, Balan gets closer with Sumitra. Balan thrashes Pappu (Innocent) who challenges their relationship. Rajendran mentally tortures Sasikala while Sumitra gets closer to Balan. But Sumitra gets upset when Balan praises her beauty and Balan tries to find the reason for her distress. Since Sumitra was not yielding to disclose the truth, Balan vows to leave her for ever and the emotional blackmailing made her reveal what happened in her past. On the night of Sukumaran's death, Sumitra visited his house to collect the photos, but she saw Sukumaran in a pool of blood. She couldn't recover the photos. A relative of Sasikala informs Sumitra about the suicide of Sasikala while Ratheesh who is originally a Crime Branch Officer arrests Rajalakshmi's brother who killed Sukumaran to save his sister from torture. Rajendran who comes back to see Sumitra is rejected by her. Balan comeback with the photos recovered from Sukumaran's house and destroys them in front of Sumitra and leaves her with the promise to come back.

== Soundtrack ==
The music was composed by Kannur Rajan and the lyrics were written by Madhu Alappuzha.

| No. | Song | Singers | Lyrics | Length (m:ss) |
|---|---|---|---|---|
| 1 | "Udayagiriyirangivarum" | K. S. Chithra | Madhu Alappuzha | |
| 2 | "Vishuppakshi Chilachu" | K. J. Yesudas | Madhu Alappuzha | |
