= Sreekrishna Parunthu =

Sree Krishna Parunthu
- Poster
- Directed by: A. Vincent
- Written by: P. V. Thampi
- Based on: Krishna Parunthu by P. V. Thampi
- Produced by: Mani Malliath
- Starring: Mohanlal; Bindu; Pavithra
- Cinematography: Ajayan Vincent
- Edited by: S. Mony
- Music by: K. Raghavan
- Production company: Ragam Movies
- Distributed by: Century Release
- Release date: 7 September 1984
- Running time: 142 minutes
- Country: India
- Language: Malayalam

Sree Krishna Parunthu (transl. The Brahminy kite) is a 1984 Indian Malayalam-language horror film directed by A. Vincent and written by P. V. Thampi based on his novel Krishna Parunthu. The film stars Mohanlal, Balan K. Nair, Jagathy Sreekumar, Pavithra, and Bindu. The story is about Kumaran, a complete rogue, who turns out to be a pious saint and the temptations he has to suffer. The music for the film was composed by K. Raghavan. The film was a major commercial success of that year at Mollywood box office.

== Plot ==
Puthoor Tharavad is a traditional family that practices positive mantric magic under blessings of their family god, Lord Garuda, popularly known as Sri Vishnu Parunthu (The Eagle of Lord Vishnu). The family is widely respected for their ability to revive near-dead people due to venomous snake bites using the sacred water through invoking Garuda. Pappu, who is the current magician of the family, foresees his death and decides to transfer all his knowledge to his nephew Kumaran Thampi. Kumaran, whose only interest is wine and women reluctantly accepts the decision, as the magician must vow to maintain extreme celibacy. Pappu transfers all his knowledge to Kumaran and dies. Thus Kumaran becomes the next magician of the locality famous for curing snake bites and warding off evil spirits.

One night Kumaran goes to his ancestral palace for collecting manuscripts on traditional magic. On his return, he encounters the ghost of Lakshmikutty, who tries to attract Kumaran. Lakshmikutty died of a snake bite while having sexual intercourse with Kumaran earlier. Using his magical powers, Kumaran gains control over the ghost. Lakshmikutty vows to Kumaran that she will not disturb him till he keeps his celibacy (Brahmacharya). Choorakkattu Bhattathiri is a local black magician who wants to gain supremacy on the locality by destroying the magical powers of Kumaran and he worships Vada-yakshi, who resides in the Banyan tree along with demoness Dhuma. From ghosts to women, he tries everything to do it, but Kumaran escapes with his powers. Meanwhile, Kumaran gets attracted towards Bhanumathi, who starts to disturb him in his dreams. Soon Kumaran loses control over his emotions and breaks his Brahmacharya by having sex with Meenakshi, a local prostitute. Here starts the deterioration of Kumaran's magical powers.

The ghost of Lakshmikutty returns, since Kumaran has breached his brahmacharya. Again using his magical powers, Kumaran convinces her and keeps her locked inside his outbuilding. As he broke his celibacy vows, he can't invoke Garuda anymore and loses much of his magical powers. Kumaran starts to perform black magic for making money, since he is not able to concentrate. Choorakkattu Bhattathiri uses Vada Yakshi and Dhuma Demoness to kill all relatives of Kumaran. While Garuda saved the pious mother of Kumaran from Vada Yakshi, Dhuma was successful in burning the niece of Kumaran. However the nephew was saved, as he was wearing the magical amulet.

Soon he marries Bhanumathi, which makes his mother leave his home. On the day before his marriage, Kumaran gets attracted to the persuasions from Lakshmikutty and gets trapped by having sexual intercourse with her. Lakshmikutty curses Kumaran that he will not be able to have sex with any other woman. Due to this, Kumaran tries to avoid sexual intercourse with Bhanumathi, which evokes doubts on her. Later, she finds the relationship between Kumaran and Lakshmikutty. One night, she enters the outbuilding by breaking the magical barriers, mistaking Lakshmikutty as a normal woman. The ghost of Lakshmikutty enters the body of Bhanumathi and starts to disturb Kumaran. An attempt by Kumaran to destroy the ghost leads to the suicide of Bhanumathi.

A desperate Kumaran decides to stop worshipping Lord Garuda and the family goddess completely and becomes the disciple of his relative Kunjambu, another black magician, and Kumaran begins worshipping Varthali, the negative spirit of the boar-headed Goddess Varahi. Then with the help of black magic powers, Kumaran becomes successful in destroying his enemies; Lakshmikutty as well as Choorakkattu Bhattathiri. Choorakkattu Bhattathiri becomes a lunatic.

Later, Kumaran hears that his relatives are planning to secure the manuscripts from his ancestral palace. The greedy Kumaran rushes to the palace forgetting the warning from Kunajambu, that as a devotee of Varthali, he forfeits his right to worship all other Devas, including Garuda. As soon as he enters the palace, Garuda appears and attacks him. Meanwhile, when he tries to take the holy manuscripts, the protecting Goddess appears in front of him. He tries to counter with help of Varthali, but in front of the all powerful goddess, Varthali disappears. The goddess curses him and using her power, sets the palace on fire. Kumaran, who suffers severe intense burns and severe deadly blows from Garuda escapes out of the burning palace. The movie ends with the Kumaran breathing his last after transferring his knowledge to his nephew as per the tradition.

== Cast ==
- Mohanlal as Kumaran Thampi
- A Brahminy Kite as Lord Garuda
- G. Srinivasan as Choorakkattu Bhattathiri
- Kanchana as Kunjikutty Thankachi (Kumaran's mother)
- Jagathy Sreekumar as Gopalan, Kumaran's friend
- Oduvil Unnikrishnan as Maarar, Kumaran's friend
- Balan K. Nair as Kunjambu Nair, Kumaran's relative and Guru
- Pavithra as Bhanumathi
- Premji as Thanthiri
- Prameela as Meenakshi
- Bindu as Lakshmikkutty
- Mucherla Aruna as Naanikutty
- M. G. Soman as Shekharan Thampi
- Jagannatha Varma as Padmanabhan Thampi (Pappu)
- Sukumari as Maheshwari
- Mala Aravindan as Shankushar
- Thodupuzha Vasanthi
- Kunjandi
- Meena as Shekharan Thampi's mother
- P. K. Abraham
- Santhakumari

== Production ==
The film was shot in a house named Parekkattu Mana in Kanniyampuran, Ottappalam.

== Soundtrack ==
The soundtrack features three songs composed by K. Raghavan with lyrics by P. Bhaskaran. The soundtrack album was released on 1 December 1984 by Saregama.

Sree Krishna Parunthu (Original Motion Picture Soundtrack)
No.	Title	Singer(s)	Length
1.	"Thaarakangal Kelkkunnu"	Vani Jairam	4:03
2.	"Mothirakkai Viralukalaal, Pt. 1"	S. Janaki	3:28
3.	"Nilaavinte Poongavil"	Lathika	3:51
4.	"Mothirakkai Viralukalaal, Pt. 2"	S. Janaki	3:30

== Release ==
The film was a major commercial success of that year at Mollywood box office.

== See also ==
- List of Malayalam horror films
