= Shankar (actor) =

Indian actor (born 1960)

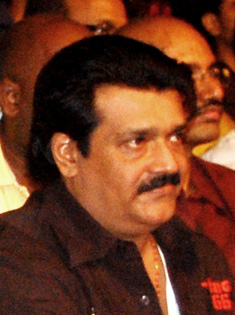
- Born: Shankar Panicker; 22 June 1960 (age 66); Thrissur, Kerala, India
- Other names: Oru Thalai Ragam Shankar; Shankar T.
- Occupations: Actor; director; businessman; social worker
- Years active: 1979–present
- Spouses: Radhika (m. 1992, divorced) Rooparekha (m. 2002; div. 2011) Chitra Lekshmi (m. 2013)
- Children: 1

Shankar Panicker (born 22 June 1960), better known as Shankar, is an Indian film and television actor, film director and producer, known for his work in Malayalam and Tamil films. He has acted in nearly 200 films in lead and supporting roles in Malayalam and Tamil cinema in the 1980s and early 90s. Shankar’s Tamil debut Oru Thalai Ragam and Malayalam debut Manjil Virinja Pookkal enjoyed theatrical runs of 365 and 250 days respectively, catapulting him to overnight stardom. The immense success of these films established him as a bankable lead and earned him a huge fan base among audiences in the 1980s. Celebrated for his handsome, chocolate-boy looks, he became a youth sensation in the 1980s, which helped him quickly rise to the status of a superstar. From the late 1990s onward, he has also worked as a director and producer while continuing his acting career.

Shankar produced the film Ezhuthola (2024), which won four awards at London Independent Film Award, Sundarban International Film Festival, and Tagore International Film Festival. Beyond his acting career, Shankar is involved in business and social welfare activities. He is widely considered as one of the romantic heroes in Malayalam cinema history.

== Early life ==
Shankar was born to Thekkeveettil N. K. Panicker and Sulochana in Kechery, Thrissur, Kerala in 1960. His family later moved to Chennai when he was four years old. His father was a senior manager at Indian Drugs and Pharmaceuticals Limited. He has two siblings, Krishnakumar and Indra. He completed the schooling from St. Bede's Anglo Indian Higher Secondary School, Chennai. He pursued a Bachelors in History from Hemwati Nandan Bahuguna Garhwal University, Rishikesh. Later, he completed 2 years of acting course at South Indian Film Chamber School of Acting, Chennai.

== Career ==
=== As an actor ===
Shankar's first film was with superstar Jayan starred Sharapanjaram in 1979. Shankar auditioned for and was the lead actor of Oru Thalai Ragam. Oru Thalai Ragam not only completed 365 days run in theatres but also became a cult romantic film of Tamil film history. Then Navodaya Studio signed Shankar for their romantic film Manjil Virinja Pookkal along with newcomers Mohanlal and Poornima Jayaram, directed by Fazil. The success of Manjil Virinja Pookal and films like Kadathu opposite Roja Ramani, Oothikachiya Ponnu with Poornima Jayaram and Ente Mohangal Poovaninju cemented Shankar as the romantic hero of Malayalam films. Simultaneously his Tamil films Sujatha, Koyil Puraa, Mouna Yuddham and Raagam Thedum Pallavi also done okay business.

Success continued in Malayalam with Shanker getting a chance in movies of hit directors like P.G. Viswambharan, Joshiy and I.V. Sasi with movies like Padayottam, Anuragakodathy, Veendum Chalikkunna Chakram, Sandhyakku Virinja Poovu and Engane Nee Marakkum. Following this success, he decided to concentrate on Malayalam films. His other successful films of 1983 are Mortuary, Hello Madras Girl and Himam. In 1984, Shankar appeared in Ente Kalithozhan, Arante Mulla Kochu Mulla, Muthodumuthu, Poochakkoru Mookkuthi and Itha Innu Muthal. Next year, he was a part of the films Archana Aaradhana, Ambada Njaane!, Aram + Aram = Kinnaram and Vannu Kandu Keezhadakki.

In mid-1980's Shankar began losing his market for doing repetitive roles, so he became a producer to save his career. He directed Sibi Malayil's Chekkaeran Oru Chilla, but the film flopped. His other major films of that year were Naale Njangalude Vivahum, Oppam Oppathinoppam and Sughamo Devi along with Mohanlal. Shankar had fewer Malayalam releases in the late 1980s and his attempt to become a director with Suresh Gopi starrer Rakshakan also did not materialize, so he decided to take a break from films to concentrate on business, although he did guest roles in the films Manathe Kottaram, Gandharvam and Guru.

Shankar staged a comeback as lead hero in the films Sooryavanam (1998), Bhadra, Sundarippravu and The Fire. He also acted in Stalin Sivadas with Mammootty, but all these films failed at the box office. So he moved to television with a successful serial Ithu Manju Pole and continued to perform in serials Swara Raagam and Parasparam. He also won the 2006 Film Critics Television Best Actor Award for his performance in TV serial Chithrashalabham. His last serial Ammakkayi (aired on Surya TV) was a success. As he wanted to concentrate on films, he stopped doing serials and made his debut as a director with Virus, a film on HIV/AIDS, which was censored in 2007.

Shankar later appeared in films like Ividam Swargamanu, Casanovva alongside Mohanlal, Rhythm, Koottukar, Banking Hours 10 to 4, Hide N' Seek, Father's Day, Oomakkuyil Padumbol and Bhoomiyude Avakashikal. In 2013, he was appreciated for his good performance in a comic role in Anoop Menon scripted film Hotel California. His other releases were Miss Lekha Tharoor Kaanunnathu and Cleopatra, Naku Penda Naku Taka and in 2015, Shankar played the lead role in Vishwasam... Athallae Ellaam along with Shine Tom Chacko directed by Jayaraj Vijay, but the film flopped. In 2018, he starred in Niranjana Pookkal as the hero. He also starred in Bhramam along with Prithviraj Sukumaran in 2021.

=== As a director ===
Shankar directed a video film Kaatti in 2006 based on child labour, which won him the best director award from Malayalam Television viewers DRISHYA awards for video film. He made his feature film debut with Virus, an Indo-American co-production urging society not to shun HIV/AIDS-affected people. His first commercial Malayalam directorial venture Keralotsavam 2009 starred Kalabhavan Mani and Vinu Mohan dealt with how three youngsters falling prey to terrorist links. In 2015, he directed Manal Naharam, a Tamil film based on NRI Indians in the U.A.E., which released to above average reviews.

== Personal life ==
Shankar's first marriage was with Radhika in December 1992, which ended in a divorce. After the failure of his first marriage, he married Rooparekha, but this marriage also ended in divorce. The couple has a son named Gokul. In 2013, he married Chitra Lekshmi, a dance teacher, and settled in the U.K.

== Filmography ==
=== As an actor ===
==== Malayalam films ====
Year	Title	Role	Notes
1979	Sarapanjaram	Baby's friend	
1980	Manjil Virinja Pookkal	Prem Kishan	
1981	Palangal	Ravi/Rails	
1981	Kadathu	Rajappan	
1981	Guha	Das	
1981	Oothikachiya Ponnu	Vishwanathan	
1982	Pooviriyum Pulari	Balan	
1982	Aranjaanam	Madhu	
1982	Kayam		
1982	Kaaliya Mardhanam	Ramu	
1982	Padayottam	Chandrootty	
1982	Ente Mohangal Poovaninju	Prasanth	
1982	Velicham Vitharunna Penkutty	Prasad	
1982	Anuraagakkodathi	Shivadas	
1983	Eettappuli	Kabeer	
1983	Ee Vazhi Mathram	Babu	
1983	Engane Nee Marakkum	Prem	
1983	Coolie	Sethu	
1983	Sandhyakku Virinja Poovu	Thilakan	
1983	Samrambham		
1983	Kodungattu	Rajan	
1983	Hello Madras Girl		
1983	Marakkillorikkalum	Pradeep	
1983	Mortuary	Venu	
1983	Angam	Johny	
1983	Thimingalam	Vijayan	
1983	Himam	Vijay	
1983	Mouna Raagam	Shankaran	
1984	Krishna Guruvaayoorappa	Unni	
1984	Anthichuvappu		
1984	Ente Kalithozhan		
1984	Poochakkoru Mookkuthi	Shyam	
1984	Athirathram	Abu	
1984	Aarorumariyathe	Raju	
1984	Ethirppukal	Ravi	
1984	Itha Innu Muthal	'Vaikuntam' Shankar	
1984	Vanitha Police	Shankar	
1984	Muthodumuthu	Anil	
1984	Odaruthammava Aalariyam	Anil	
1984	Amme Narayana		
1984	Oru Thettinte Katha		
1984	Paavam Krooran	Madhusoodanan	
1984	Piriyilla Naam	Babu	
1984	Thirakkil Alppa Samayam	Rahim	
1984	Umaanilayam	Vinod	
1984	Jeevitham	Narayanankutty	
1984	Arante Mulla Kochu Mulla	Omanakuttan	
1984	Veendum Chalikkunna Chakram	Vinayan	
1985	Punnaram Cholli Cholli		
1985	Ambada Njaane!	Kuttikrishnan	
1985	Aram + Aram = Kinnaram	Balan	
1985	Archana Aradhana	Vimal Kumar	
1985	Aarodum Parayaruthu	Gopi	
1985	Choodatha Pookal	Ravi	
1985	Mounanombaram	Venu	
1985	Mukhyamanthri	Venu	
1985	Nerariyum Nerathu	Rajeev	
1985	Onnanam Kunnil Oradi Kunnil	Anand	
1985	Onningu Vannengil	Baby	
1985	Oru Kudakeezhil	Ravi	
1985	Oru Naal Innoru Naal	Sukumaran	
1985	Oru Sandesam Koodi	Gopi	
1985	Parayanumvayya Parayathirikkanumvayya	T. G. Raveendran	
1985	Sammelanam	Ramu	
1985	Saandham Bheekaram		
1985	Boeing Boeing	Man at Restaurant	Cameo
1985	Pachavelicham	Mukundan	
1985	Scene No. 7		
1985	Soundaryappinakkam	Anil	
1985	Vannu Kandu Keezhadakki	Dr. Ravi	
1985	Vasantha Sena	Mahesh Varma	
1986	Adukkan Entheluppam	Satheeshan	
1986	Ashtabandham	Abdu	
1986	Chekkaeran Oru Chilla	Unni	
1986	Dheem Tharikida Thom	Suresh Menon	
1986	Ilanjippookkal	Satheesh	
1986	Naale Njangalude Vivaham	Haridas	
1986	Nimishangal	Ravi	
1986	Oppam Oppathinoppam	Gopinath	
1986	Ithramathram	Guest at the wedding	
1986	Oru Yugasandhya	Babu	
1986	Ponnum Kudathinum Pottu	Gopan	
1986	Sughamo Devi	Nandan	
1986	Ayalvasi Oru Daridravasi	Balu	
1986	Viswasichalum Illenkilum		
1987	Amme Bhagavathi	Unni	
1987	Ithrayum Kalam	Sulaiman	
1987	Aalippazhangal	Sudheer	
1987	Ithente Neethi	Ravi	
1987	Ajantha		
1987	Onnaam Maanam Poomaanam	Ravi	
1988	Evidence	Prince	
1989	Bhadrachitta	Madhu	
1990	Niyamam Enthucheyyum		
1991	Master Plan	S. I. Vijay Varma	
1991	Abhimanyu	Shekhar	
1991	Kizhakkunarum Pakshi	Gopi Krishnan	
1993	Gandharvam	Chandran	Cameo
1994	Manathe Kottaram	Himself	Cameo
1995	Thakshashila	Rajeevan	
1996	Ente Soniya		
1997	Guru	Singer	Cameo
1997	Sneha Sindooram	Krishnanunni	Cameo
1998	Sooryavanam	Ajith	
1999	Stalin Sivadas	Jayachandran	
2001	Bhadra	Rocky	
2002	Sravu	Marakkar	
2002	Sundarippravu	Dennis	
2002	Madhuram	Hari	
2003	The Fire	Sidharthan	
2007	Virus		Also director
2007	Twenty:20		Guest appearance in the title song
2007	Cycle	Jayadevan	Cameo
2008	Robo	Venu	
2009	Evidam Swargamanu	Sudheer	
2009	Keralotsavam 2009	Dancer	Also director; special appearance
2010	Koottukar	Masthan Bhai	
2011	China Town	Jayakrishnan	Cameo
2012	Casanovva	Ajoy	
2012	Oomakkuyil Padumbol	Doctor	
2012	Father's Day	Ram Menon	
2012	Banking Hours 10 to 4	Fernandez	
2012	Bhoomiyude Avakashikal		
2012	Hide N' Seek	Niranjan	
2013	Hotel California	Aby Mathew	
2013	Cleopatra		
2013	Miss Lekha Tharoor Kaanunnathu	Dr. Balasubramanyiam	
2014	Naku Penda Naku Taka	Iyer	
2015	Akashangalil	Devadathan	
2015	Vishwasam... Athallae Ellaam	A. S. A. Luca	
2015	Njan Samvidhanam Cheyyum		150th Film
2017	Neeranjana Pookal	Kiranlal	
2018	Drama		Cameo
2020	Oru Vathil Kottai	Suresh Nair	
2021	Bhramam	Actor Uday Kumar	
2022	Ormakalil	DIG	
2024	Ezhuthola	—N/a	As producer; credited as Shankar T.
2024	Bad Boyz	Prem Menon	

==== Tamil films ====
Year	Title	Role	Notes
1980	Oru Thalai Ragam	Raja	
1980	Sujatha		
1981	Mouna Yuddham		
1981	Koyil Puraa		
1982	Nadamaadum Silaigal		
1982	Udhayamakirathu		
1982	Kanalukku Karaiyethu		
1982	Raagam Thedum Pallavi	Madhu	
1982	Punitha Malar	Prasad	
1989	Kadhal Enum Nadhiyinile	Prem Kumar	
1991	Thayamma	Rangarajan	
1991	MGR Nagaril	Victor	
2007	Ninaithu Ninaithu Parthen		
2015	Manal Nagaram	Ibrahim Rabbani	Also director

=== As director ===
Year	Title	Langage	Notes
2007	Virus	Malayalam	
2009	Keralotsavam 2009	Malayalam	
2015	Manal Naharam	Tamil	Dubbed in Malayalam as Sand City
2026	Eric	Malayalam	

== Television Serials ==
- Ithu Manju Pole
- Swara Raagam (Asianet)
- Parasparam (Surya TV)
- Chithrashalabham (Amrita TV)
- Ammakkayi (Surya TV)
- Thulabharam (Surya TV)
- Ammathottil (Asianet)
- Monuttante Onam - telefilm
