= Kadathu =

- Directed by: P. G. Vishwambharan
- Written by: Kanam E. J. Priyadarshan(dialogues)
- Screenplay by: P. G. Vishwambharan(in credits)
- Starring: Prem Nazir; Shankar; M. G. Soman; Roja Ramani
- Cinematography: C. E. Babu; Chandramohan
- Edited by: V. P. Krishnan
- Music by: Shyam
- Production company: Sunitha Productions
- Distributed by: Sunitha Productions
- Release date: 30 October 1981
- Country: India
- Language: Malayalam

Kadathu is a 1981 Indian Malayalam film, directed by P. G. Vishwambharan. The film stars Prem Nazir, Shankar, M. G. Soman and Roja Ramani in the lead roles. The film has musical score by Shyam. Actually, the script was penned by Priyadharshan. When the movie screened in the theaters, he noticed the credit had gone to the director himself.

== Cast ==
- Prem Nazir as Gopinath
- Shankar as Rajappan
- M. G. Soman as Ravi
- Roja Ramani as Maalu
- Sumalatha as Thulasi
- Jagathy Sreekumar as Meesha Vasu Pilla
- Adoor Bhasi as School Head Master
- Alummoodan as School Peon Kittu Pilla
- Baby Ponnambili
- T. G. Ravi as Kaala Dhamu
- Chembarathi Shobana
- K. P. A. C. Azeez Police Officer
- Bheeman Raghu
- Nellikode Bhaskaran
- Poojappura Ravi
- Aryad Gopalakrishnan
- Shubha as Sarala
- Adoor Bhavani
- Beena Kumbalangi

== Soundtrack ==
The music was composed by Shyam and the lyrics were written by Bichu Thirumala.

No.	Song	Singers	Lyrics	Length (m:ss)
1	"Manjanaathi Kunnummel"	S. Janaki	Bichu Thirumala	
2	"Olangal Thaalam Thallumpol"	Unni Menon	Bichu Thirumala	
3	"Premaragam Padivannoru"	S. Janaki	Bichu Thirumala	
4	"Punnare Poonthinkale"	Unni Menon	Bichu Thirumala	
5	"Vennilaacholayil"	S. Janaki, Unni Menon	Bichu Thirumala	

== Trivia ==
- Priyadarshan approached producer Aroma M Mani with the first ever script he penned which was to be filmed by PG Vishwambharan but it was decided that a newcomer as a script writer would not fare well in the market so screenplay was credited to the director.
