= In Return: Just a Book =

- Theatrical release poster
- Directed by: Shiny Benjamin
- Written by: Paul Zacharia
- Based on: Oru Sankeerthanam Pole by Perumbadavam Sreedharan
- Produced by: Baby Mathew Somatheeram
- Starring: Vladimir Postnikov; Oksana Karmishina; Perumbadavam Sreedharan
- Cinematography: K G Jayan
- Edited by: B. Ajithkumar
- Music by: Sarrath
- Production company: Soma Creations
- Release date: 17 November 2016
- Running time: 44:20
- Country: India
- Languages: Malayalam; Russian

In Return: Just a Book is a 2016 Indian short docudrama film written by Paul Zacharia and directed by Shiny Benjamin. The film is based on Perumbadavam Sreedharan's novel Oru Sankeerthanam Pole, about the life and times of Russian writer Fyodor Dostoyevsky. It was screened at the Indian Panorama section of the 47th International Film Festival of India in the Documentary Non-Fiction category.

The film interweaves documentary and fiction to explore the dynamics that connect creativities, bridging space and time. It attempts to understand how one great imagination may sow the seed of another original act of creation, taking a quantum jump across geographical distances and centuries. It employs the real-life story of how the life and work of the great Russian master Dostoevsky inspired the Indian writer, Perumpadavam Sreedharan, to write a novel about him which, incidentally, became a best-seller.

== Plot ==
Perumpadavam Sreedharan's novel in Malayalam Oru Sankeerthanam Pole (Like a Psalm) was written in 1993 and dealt with 21 days in the life of Fyodor Dostoevsky. Those were the days Dostoevsky fell in love with Anna Gregoryevna Snitkina, who was his new stenographer taking down his novel The Gambler. In heavy debt to his publisher, Dostoevsky was facing a deadline that carried a big penalty, to deliver the finished manuscript. ‘Like a Psalm’ describes with lyrical simplicity those 21 days of love and despair, imbuing the theme with empathy and emotional insight. Sreedharan's novel, now in its 61st edition and 21st year, continues to be a best-seller in Malayalam.

The film takes Sreedharan on his first ever visit to Russia and St. Petersburg, a country and a city he had imagined out of almost nothing, except for his reading in translation of the great Russian novelists, including Dostoevsky. His journey of discovery starts from his village in interior Kerala as he recalls how, as he wrote his novel, those 21 days of Dostoyevsky had entrapped him as if his life had caught fire and how he was entangled in Dostoevsky's traumatic and troubled personality. His memories of writing the novel, presented through brief face-to-face encounters and voice-overs, are supplemented by enacted moments that flash forward to the present, crystallizing the dynamics of recollection.

The film follows him in St. Petersburg as he explores a city he had once imagined from nothing, looking at its great landmarks, visiting Dostoevsky's home, sitting on Neva's shore, wandering in the country side. As he immerses himself in the city recollecting Dostoevsky and his intense creative engagement with him, visions and moments from his novel envelopes his present and he becomes an eye-witness to them. Soon Sreedharan is back in his village, merged into its quiet flow and the journey into the far-away world of his novel turned into a beautiful memory.

== Cast ==
- Vladimir Postnikov as Fyodor Dostoevsky.
- Oksana Karmishina as Anna Snitkina
- Perumbadavam Sreedharan as Himself

== Development ==
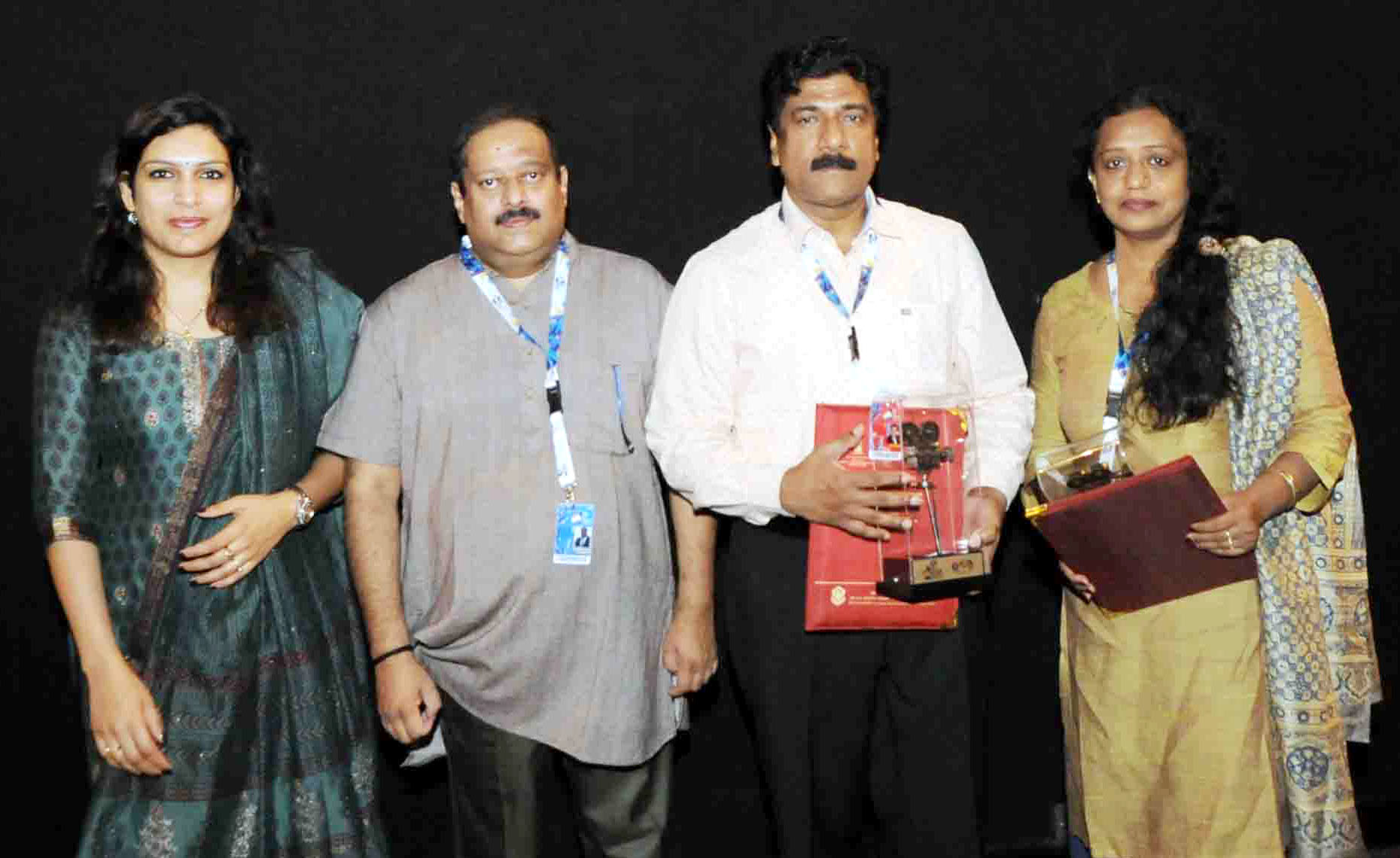
Film crew at IFFI (2016)

The idea of such a movie was born when a group of friends were discussing the influence of Russian literature on writers and readers in Kerala. That is when Ratheesh C. Nair, director of the Russian Cultural Centre in Thiruvananthapuram, came up with the concept of the film, In Return: Just A Book.

== Release ==
In Return: Just A Book premiered at the Kalabhavan Theatre in Thiruvananthapuram, Kerala on 17 November 2016.
