= Guha (film) =

- Promotional Poster
- Directed by: M. R. Jose
- Written by: M. R. Jose
- Screenplay by: M. R. Jose
- Produced by: P. H. Rasheed
- Starring: Shankar; Ambika; Jagathy Sreekumar; Mini; Mancheri Chandran
- Cinematography: T. N. Krishnankutty Nair
- Edited by: B. S. Mani
- Music by: Shankar–Ganesh
- Production company: Roshni Arts
- Distributed by: Roshni Arts
- Release date: 27 November 1981
- Country: India
- Language: Malayalam

Guha is a 1981 Indian Malayalam-language film, directed by M. R. Jose and produced by P. H. Rasheed. The film stars Shankar, Ambika, Jagathy Sreekumar, Mini and Mancheri Chandran. The film has musical score by Shankar–Ganesh.

== Cast ==
- Shankar as Das
- Ambika as Devu
- Vincent as Dr. Prasad
- Jagathy Sreekumar
- Mini as Anitha
- Mancheri Chandran
- Menaka as Suvarna
- Vijayan as Prabhu
- Bahadoor as Chandrasekhara Kaimal
- K. S. N. Raj
- Pournami
- Sairabhanu
- Vanitha Krishnachandran as Kamala

== Soundtrack ==
The music was composed by Shankar–Ganesh and the lyrics were written by Mankombu Gopalakrishnan.

No.	Song	Singers	Lyrics	Length (m:ss)
1	"Swapnam Pootha Nenchil"	K. J. Yesudas	Mankombu Gopalakrishnan	
2	"Thodu Thodu"	Vani Jairam	Mankombu Gopalakrishnan	
