= Perumbadavam Sreedharan =

Indian writer

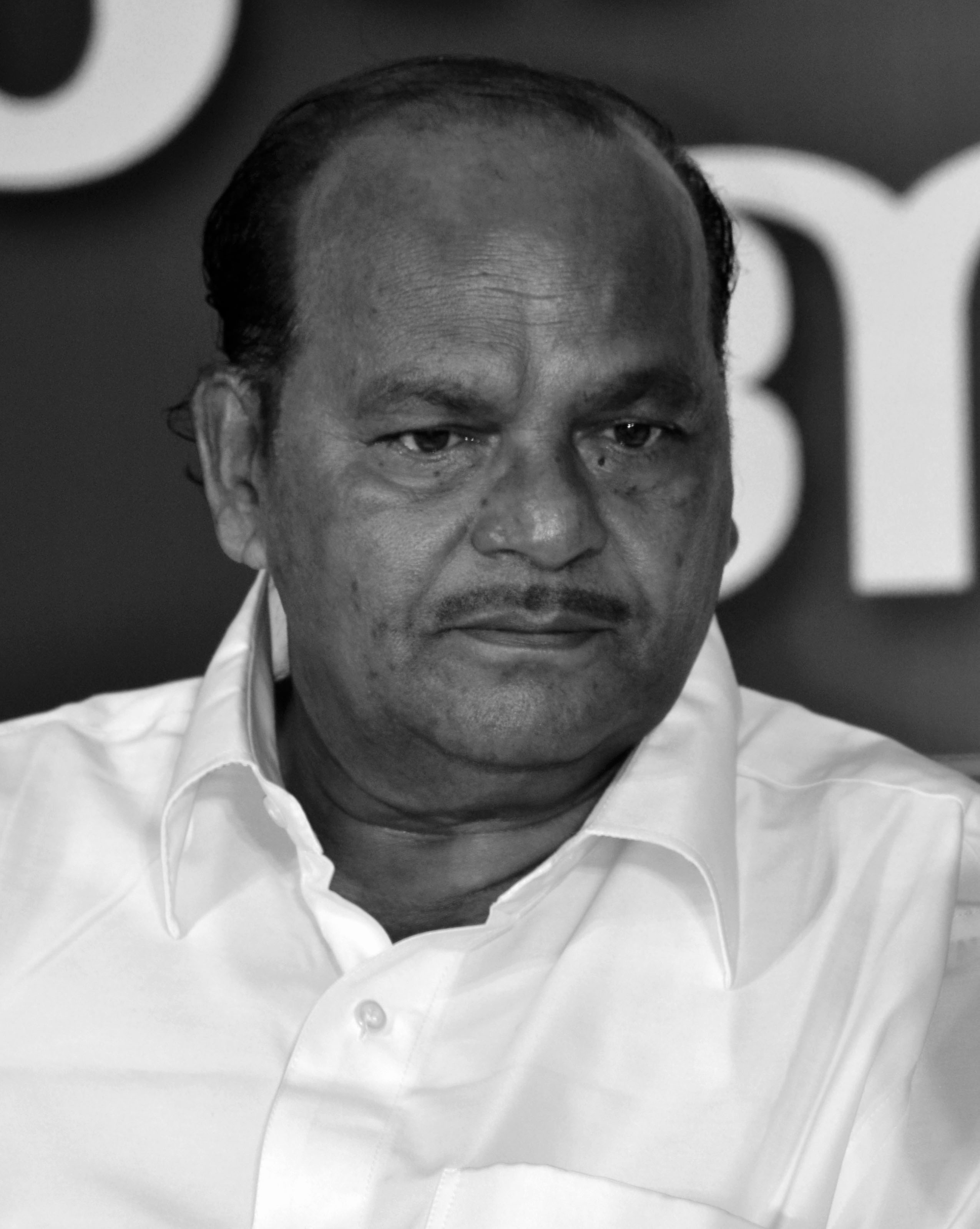
- Born: 12 February 1938 (age 88); Perumpadavam, Elanji, Piravom, Ernakulam district, Kerala
- Occupation: writer

Perumbadavam Sreedharan (born 12 February 1938) is a Malayalam author from Kerala, India. He is former chairman of Kerala Sahitya Akademi. He has written several novels and short stories. One of his best known novels is Oru Sankeerthanam Pole (1993) for which he won the Vayalar Award in 1996. He got Kerala Sahitya Akademi Award for his novel Ashtapadi. In 2006, he was awarded the Malayattoor Award for his novel, Narayanam.

Born in the village of Perumpadavam, in Elanji Panchayath Piravom, Ernakulam district of Kerala, Perumpadavam (as he is often called) started his literary career by writing poetry. He later shifted to short stories and novels. Perumpadavam has also authored scripts for 12 Malayalam films. He has been noted for his connection with the Russian language and is recognised by some as a doyen of Malayalam literature.

== Oru Sankeerthanam Pole ==
The novel Oru Sankeerthanam Pole was first published in 1993 and was released in its 37th edition on 1 November 2008 after setting publishing records in 2005. It is a story based on the life of famous Russian writer, Fyodor Dostoyevsky and his wife Anna. This highly successful novel has sold over 100,000 copies in about 12 years. This is a record in Malayalam literature. The book surpassed 100th edition, with above 200,000 copies in about 24 years.

== List of works ==
Perumpadavam's works include:

=== Novels ===
Year	Title	Publisher	Notes
1959	Aval Oru Hoori Ayirunnu	Champakulam: BKM	
1963	Anthivelichavum Kumkumapookkalum	Champakulam: BKM	
1963	Chillu Kottaram	Kollam: Sreeramavilasom	
1963	Poovu Kaanatha Kaavukal	Tiruvalla: Southern	
1963	Sarppakavu	Champakulam: BKM	
1967	Abhayam (The Shelter)	Kottayam: SPCS	Based on the life of writer Rajalakshmi; Adapted into the 1970 film of the same name
1970	Ente Vazhi Ninte Vazhi	Kottayam: NBS	
1970	Nilavinte Bhangi	Irinjalakuda: Janmabhumi	
1971	Ayilyam	Kottayam: SPCS	
1971	Kaalvariyilekku Veendum	Moovattupuzha: Victory	
1974	Ashtapadi	Kottayam: SPCS	Adapted into the 1983 film of the same name
1975	Aayiram Katham Doore	Kottayam: SPCS	
1975	Sooryadaham	Kottayam: DC Books	Adapted into the 1981 film of the same name
1976	Jalahomam	Kottayam: Priyamvada	
1977	Anthiveyilile Ponnu (The Gold in the Dusk)	Kottayam: SPCS	Adapted into the 1982 film of the same name
1977	Greeshmajwalakal (The Flames of Summer)	Kottayam: SPCS	Adapted into the 1981 film Greeshma Jwala
1978	Yakshippala	Trivandrum: Prabhatham	
1979	Karpooram	Kottayam: SPCS	
1979	Kallinmel Kallu Sheshikathe	Cochin: CICC	
1981	Padayani	Kottayam: SPCS	
1981	Pinneyum Pookkunna Kadu (The Forest That Bloom Again)	Kottayam: NBS	Adapted into the 1982 film of the same name
1981	Hridayathile Venal (The Summer in The Heart)	Konni: Venus Book Depot	
1981	Pakalpooram	Thrissur: Current	
1981	Iruttil Parakkunna Pakshi (The Bird That Fly in Dark)	Kottayam: SPCS	
1981	Yathra (The Journey)	Konni: Venus Book Depot	
1983	Arkkavum Ilaveyilum	Kottayam: SPCS	Short novels
1983	Ormakkoru Poomaram	Kottayam: Current	
1983	Smrithi		
1984	Aaranya Geetham	Kottayam: SPCS	
1984	Thevaram	Calicut: Poorna	
1985	Idinju Polinja Lokam	Trivandrum: Vijayodaya	
1986	Kanneerppaadangal	Moovattupuzha: Victory	
1986	Gandharvan Kotta	Kottayam: SPCS	New edition titled Kadalkkarayile Veedu (1998)
1987	Nishagandhi	Konni: Venus	
1987	Meghachaya	Kottayam: DC Books	
1987	Sooryane Aninja Sthree (The Woman Who Adorned the Sun)	Trivandrum: Parvathi	
1988	Ottachilambu (Single Anklet)	Kottayam: SPCS	
1988	Thrishna	Cochin: Poompatta	
1989	Ente Hridayathinte Udama (The Master of My Heart)	Kottayam: DC Books	Adapted into the 2002 film of the same name
1989	Ezhamvaathil (The Seventh Gate)	Kottayam: NBS	
1989	Neerpola	Moovattupuzha: Victory	
1990	Pradakshina Vazhi	Kottayam: SPCS	
1990	Mazhanilavu	Trivandrum: Prabhatham	Adapted into the 2002 film of the same name
1991	Asthamayathinte Kadal	Trivandrum: Prabhatham	
1993	Oru Sankeerthanam Pole (Like a Hymn)	Kottayam: NBS	With an introduction by V. Rajakrishnan; Based on the life of Dostoyevsky and his wife Anna; Adapted into the 2016 film In Return: Just a Book
1993	Idathavalam	Calicut: Poorna	
1993	Gopurathinu Thazhe	Trivandrum: Prabhatham	
1998	Aroopiyude Moonnam Pravu	Kollam: Sankeerthanam	
1998	Kadalkkarayile Veedu	Kollam: Sankeerthanam	New edition of Gandharvan Kotta (1986)
2001	Vaalmunayil Vacha Manassu	Kollam: Sankeerthanam	
2003	Sankhumudrayulla Vaal	Kollam: Sankeerthanam	
2004	Narayanam	Kollam: Sankeerthanam	Based on the life of Sri Narayana Guru
2007	Oru Keeru Akasam	Kollam: Sankeerthanam	Based on the life of C. J. Thomas
2007	Snehathinteyum Maranathinteyum Athiru	Kollam: Sankeerthanam	Short novel
2011	Kadal Pole Kadal	Kollam: Sankeerthanam	Collection of two short novels: Sodom Gomorrah, Karutha Nilavu
2020	Aswaaroodante Varavu	Kollam: Sankeerthanam	Based on the life of Alexander the Great

=== Short story collections ===
Year	Title	Publisher	Notes
1961	Oru Kettuthaliyum Kure Ormakalum (A Wedding Necklace and Many Memories)	Kollam: Sreeramavilasom	Collection of 7 stories
1975	Parayi Petta Panthirukulam	Kottayam: Vidyarthi Mithram	
1979	Venalil Pookunna Maram (The Tree That Blossom in Summer)	Kottayam: SPCS	Collection of 25 stories
1997	Ninte Koodarathinarike (Near Your Tent)	Kollam: Sankeerthanam	Collection of 6 stories
1996	Ilathumbukalile Mazha (The Rain at the Leaf's End)	Kollam: Sankeerthanam	Collection of 20 stories
1998	Kripanidiyude Kottaram	Kollam: Sankeerthanam	Collection of 24 stories
2000	Doorangal Kadannu (A Long Long Way)	Kollam: Sankeerthanam	Collection of 23 stories
2000	Daivathinte Kattile Orila (A Leaf from the God's Forest)	Kollam: Sankeerthanam	Collection of 18 stories
2011	December	Kollam: Sankeerthanam	

=== Children's literature ===
Year	Title	Publisher	Notes
1965	Kalampatta Pookkal	Kottayam: Vidyarthi Mithram	21 stories for children
1968	Kalidasa Katha	Kottayam: SPCS	Based on the life of Kalidasa
1965	Virunnu	Kottayam: Vidyarthi Mithram	39 stories for children
1975	Yavanapuranathile Aaromunni	Kottayam: SPCS	Based on the story of Theseus
1993	Nilavinte Bhangi	Trivandrum: Bala Sahitya Institute	With illustrations by G. V. Sreekumar
2000	Daivathinte Kalippattangal	Kollam: Sankeerthanam	

=== Other works ===
Year	Title	Publisher	Notes
1966	Bodhivriksham	Thrissur: Current	Play
1966	Ponpara Kondu Snehamalannu	Kollam: Sankeerthanam	Collection of 14 essays and 13 memoirs
2004	Hridaya Rekha	Kollam: Sankeerthanam	Collection of 32 essays written in Deepika
2005	Otta Sikharathinte Maram	Kollam: Sankeerthanam	Collection of essays

== Awards ==
- 1975: Kerala Sahitya Akademi Award for Novel (Ashtapadi)
- 1980: Kerala State Film Award for Best Story (Surya Daham)
- 1980: Kerala Film Critics Association Award for Best Story (Surya Daham)
- 1983: Kerala Film Critics Association Award for Best Story (Ashtapadi)
- 1996: Vayalar Award (Oru Sankeerthanam Pole)
- 1996: Bala Sahitya Award by Kerala State Institute of Children's Literature (Nilavinte Bhangi)
- 2013: Vallathol Award
- 2020: Kerala Sahitya Akademi Fellowship
- 2006: Malayattoor Award (Narayanam)
- 2014: Thakazhi Award
- 2020: Benigna Award
