= Samudhayam =

- Directed by: Ambili
- Produced by: Premkumar Marath
- Starring: Madhu; K. P. A. C. Lalitha; Ashokan; Baiju
- Cinematography: Ramachandra Babu
- Music by: G. Devarajan
- Production company: Akshaya Productions
- Distributed by: Akshaya Productions
- Release date: 16 January 1995
- Country: India
- Language: Malayalam

Samudhayam (സമുദായം, English: The Community) is a 1995 Indian Malayalam-language film, directed by Ambili. The film stars Madhu, K. P. A. C. Lalitha, Ashokan Vindhuja Menon and Baiju in the lead roles. The film has musical score by G. Devarajan.

== Cast ==
- Madhu
- K. P. A. C. Lalitha
- Ashokan
- Baiju
- Idavela Babu
- Maathu
- N. F. Varghese
- Biju Menon
- Vinduja Menon
- Mamukkoya
- Kalabhavan Mani

== Soundtrack ==
The music was composed by G. Devarajan and the lyrics were written by O. N. V. Kurup and P. Bhaskaran.

No.	Song	Singers	Lyrics	Length (m:ss)
1	"Aananda Hemantha"	K. J. Yesudas, K. S. Chithra	O. N. V. Kurup	
2	"Alayumen Priyathara"	K. J. Yesudas	O. N. V. Kurup	
3	"Alayumen Priyathara" (F)	K. S. Chithra	O. N. V. Kurup	
4	"Alayumen Priyathara" (D)	K. J. Yesudas, P. Madhuri	O. N. V. Kurup	
5	"Manavaatti"	P. Susheela, Chorus	P. Bhaskaran	
