= Ms Lekha Tharoor Kaanunnathu =

Ms. Lekha Tharoor Kanunnathu
- Poster
- Directed by: Shajiyem
- Written by: K. Sooraj; Shajiyem
- Starring: Meera Jasmine; Suraj Venjarammoodu; Nandu; Geetha Vijayan; Sunil Sukhada; Shankar Panicker
- Cinematography: Chandra Mouli
- Music by: Ramesh Narayan
- Production company: Saranam Pictures
- Distributed by: Saranam Pictures Release
- Release date: 29 November 2013
- Running time: 137 minutes
- Country: India
- Language: Malayalam

Ms. Lekha Tharoor Kanunnathu is a 2013 Indian Malayalam-language psychological horror film produced by K. K. Suresh Chandran and directed by Shajiyem.

The film is an adaptation of the 2002 Hong Kong film The Eye. The movie features Meera Jasmine, Badri, Suraj Venjarammoodu, Nandu, Geetha Vijayan and Shankar Panicker. The movie was later dubbed into Tamil as Kangal Irandal and in Telugu as Eyes.

== Plot ==
TV host Lekha Tharoor unexpectedly begins experiencing disturbing, violent visions. After explaining her mental state to friends and colleagues, she is presumed psychotic and is referred to a psychiatric hospital for treatment.

== Cast ==
- Meera Jasmine as Lekha Tharoor
  - Nandhana Varma as young Lekha
- Badri as Dr. Alex
- Shankar Panicker as Village Doctor
- Suraj Venjarammoodu as Camera Operator
- Nandu as Nandagopalan Nair
- Geetha Vijayan as Muthulakshmi
- Nilambur Ayisha
- Sunil Sukhada
- Krishna
- Jose
- Rosin Jolly as Veni
- Asha Aravind as Lekha’s sister
- Arun Ghosh

== Production ==
Meera Jasmine, who began reappearing in films by late-2012 after a brief break, plays the lead role in the film. Shajiyem had the actress in mind when he was developing the character, saying: "When she heard the story, she readily agreed to take the role and we eagerly awaited her available dates." Badri, who was one of the heroes in Mamas' Cinema Company (2012), plays the male lead.

The film is set in the city of Kochi, and was filmed in Kochi, Pollachi and Palakkad. Shooting ended in late May 2013.

== See also ==
- List of Malayalam horror films
