= Ambili (director) =

Indian artist and director

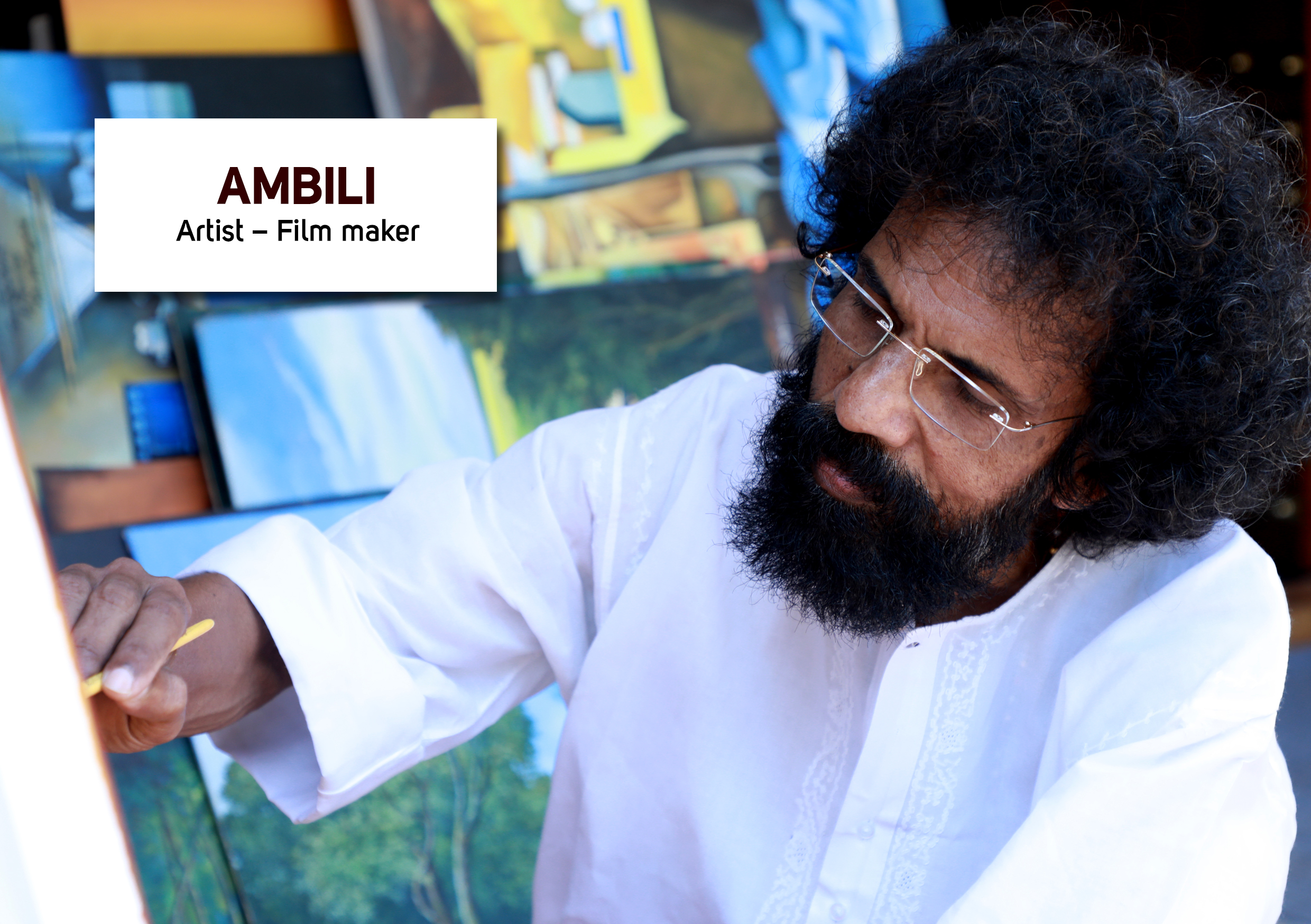
- Born: Chentrappinni, Thrissur, Kerala, India
- Occupations: Film director Art director Photographer; Painting artist
- Years active: 1983-present

Ambili is a film director, art director, photographer and painting artist from the state of Kerala, India. His notable films are Veena poovu, Ashtapadi, Maunaragam, Swantham Sarika, Chamante Kabani and Samudhayam. He lives in Ernakulam.

== Early life ==
Ambili was born and brought up in the coastal village of Chentrappinni, in Thrissur, Kerala, South India.

== Career ==
After his S.S.L.C. he joined in the Fine Arts College, Trichur. He has won many first prizes for painting in youth festivals. Famous film directors P. N. Menon and Bharathan were the students of this institution. In 1971, Ramu Karyatt contested in the parliament election. Ambili got a chance to design posters for him.

For some time Ambili worked as a designer in UMA printers in Trichur. During this period, it was Ambili who prepared the notices of the famous dramatist Kaladi Gopi's 'Perumbavoor Nataka Sala'. He also designed the back curtains of this troupe. He did the art direction of the drama 'Thulasithara' by the famous dramatist 'Sreemoola Nagaram Vijayan'. He also took up still photography while being active in the drama. His was the hands behind the magnificent backdrops, makeups and other design works in the plays of eminent dramatists K.P.A.C., P. J. Antony, A. N. Ganesh, Sreemoolanagaram Mohan, Kazhimbram Vijayan, and Abdul Chentrappinni. Through the film Nellu directed by Karyatt, Ambili got an entry into the cine world. He designed the posters for the films Nellu, Ragam, and Pallavi.

He got a chance to work as a still photographer for P Chandrakumar's Smayamayilla polum. Sathyan Anthikkad was working as assistant director to Chandrakumar and with his recommendation Ambili got the chance to be the art director for this film. But this film did not come to light due to some dispute between the producer and director.

The famous novel Bhrasht by Madamb Kunjukuttan became a film. The director was Triprayar Sukumaran. Ambili worked as still photographer in this film. It was his first film as still photographer. Realising Ambili's talent as a painter, Chandrakumar recommended him as poster designer and art director in his next film Asthamayam. He was art director and poster designer for UMA Studios films Prabhatha Santhya, Sudhi kalasam, Archana Teacher, and Griha Lakshmy. In all these films his work was excellent. He also did title painting for Sreekumaran Thampi's 'Aakkramanam' and 'Ganam' and P. G. Viswanbharans 'Kadath'. He was art director for the following films: Balachandra Menon's Kalika, Vaiki vanna vasantham, Anayatha vilakkukal, Ishtamundu pakshe, etc. Thus he created his own space in the Malayalam film industry.

Ambili's first directorial venture is Veena poovu, produced in the banner Soorya International. He was also the script writer of this film. Nedumudi Venu, Sankar Mohan, Babu Namboodiri, Bahadur, Uma, and Sukumari were the main artists in the film - lyrics by Sreekumaran Thampi & Mullanezhi, and music by Vidhyadharan Master. The song 'Nashta swargangale' won the heart of thousands and the film itself was a great success because of this different and simple style of narration. It was a great honour for Ambili that his first film Veena poovu was one in the four films selected to Indian Panorama; others are Elipathayam by Adoor Gopalakrishnan, Ormakkayi by Bharathan and Oridathu by Aravindan. The one Malayalam film selected to Turkish film festival that year was Veena Poovu.

His next film was Ashtapadi based on a novel by Perumbadavam Sreedharan. Bharath Gopi, Devan, Babu Namboodiri, Premji, Ravi Menon, Adoor Bhavani, Menaka, Uma, Sreemoolanagaram Vijayan were the main actors. It was Devan's first film. Music was by Vidyadhraran master. Next film were Mouna ragam, Swantham sarika and Scene No. 7.

It took six years for him to direct his next film, his own production, Ganamela. It was in 1991, a full-length comedy film, totally different from his earlier films. Story, screenplay and dialogues were by actor Jagdish. Jagathi Sreekumar, Mala Aravindan, Idavela Babu, Kunjan, Jagannatha Varma, Geetha Vijayan, Meena, and Thrissur Elsy were the main artists. Lyrics by Kaithapram and Sasi Chittanjoor, music by three great artists, Ravindran, Jerry Amal Dev, and A. T. Ummer. All the songs were hits of the year and the film was a hit. In the same year, he did the suspense thriller Eagle. P. Sukumar, Babloo, Ramraj, Kuthiravattom Pappu, Mala Aravindan, Poonam Das Gupta, etc. starred in this film. The famous actor Biju Menon made his debut in this film.

Ambili's next film was Samudayam, which also featured the screen debut of Kalabhavan Mani.

Chaaman's Kabani was the last film released in Ambili's direction. It was the last film of Mala Aravindan who enacted the role of a 110 year old adivasi chief in this film. The film was released in 2015, although the production was complete in 2001.

Ambili is now residing in his home village Chentrappinni, Trichur district, with his wife Sheela, daughter Aisha Maria Ambili and son Rahul Thadathil. Now his time and attention totally devoted to painting. He conducted an exhibition of his paintings in Fort Kochi, March 2020.

== Filmography ==
No.	Year	Title	Screen Play
1	1983	Veena poovu	Ravisankar
2	1983	Ashtapadi	Perumbadavam Sreedharan
3	1983	Maunaragam	Ambili
4	1984	Swantham Sarika	Perumbadavam Sreedharan
5	1985	Seen No. 7	Ambili
6	1991	Ganamela	Jagadish
7	1991	Eagle	Ambili
8	1995	Samudhayam	Ravikrishnan
9	2001	Kabani	Thrissur Viswam
10	2015	Chamante Kabani	
