= Surya Daham =

- Directed by: Mohan
- Release date: 1979
- Country: India
- Language: Malayalam

Surya Daham is a 1979 Malayalam language film based on the novel of the same name by Perumbadavam Sreedharan. It is directed by Mohan. Perumbadavam Sreedharan won the Kerala State Film Award for Best Story and the Kerala Film Critics Association Award for Best Story for the film.
