= Ganamela =

- Promotional Poster
- Directed by: Ambili
- Written by: Jagadish
- Screenplay by: Jagadish
- Produced by: Ambili
- Starring: Mukesh; Geetha Vijayan; Siddique; Innocent
- Cinematography: P. Sukumar (Kiran)
- Edited by: G. Murali
- Music by: Raveendran; A. T. Ummer; Jerry Amaldev
- Production company: Ambili Cine Arts
- Distributed by: Ambili Cine Arts
- Release date: 1991
- Country: India
- Language: Malayalam

Ganamela is a 1991 Indian Malayalam-language crime comedy film directed and produced by Ambili and written by Jagadish. The film stars Mukesh, Geetha Vijayan, Siddique and Innocent. The film has musical score by Raveendran, A. T. Ummer, and Jerry Amaldev.

== Plot ==
Venugopal is the lead singer of the music band "Hits Orchestra". The band consists of keyboard player Tony Fernandez, Tabalist Shakkeer Bhai, guitarist Kannan, and violinist Babu. Despite performing well, the band struggles financially.

Venugopal falls in love with Lakshmi, the daughter of rich entrepreneur Sreedhara Panikkar. One night, Panikkar and his associates, Ganapathi and his car driver Appukuttan, decide to assault Venugopal. Venugopal plays dead using blood-coloured dye, which leads them to believe he has been murdered. They seal him in a box and decide to bury him in their house, without realising that his friends are playing close by and assisting him in escaping. Later, Venugopal returns claiming to be a Central Bureau of Investigation officer named Krishnakumar and Venugopal's twin brother, along with his helper, Mukundan. He accuses Panikkar of being the murderer and threatens him with the death penalty. Panikkar falls unconscious, and Venugopal later forgives him. However, Ganapathi is planning something wicked.

== Cast ==
- Mukesh as Venugopal/Krishnakumar
- Geetha Vijayan as Lakshmi
- Siddique as Tony Fernandez
- Innocent as Sreedhara Panikkar
- Jagathy Sreekumar as Ganapathi
- Idavela Babu as Babu
- Jagadish as Mukundan
- Mala Aravindan as Appukuttan
- Maniyanpilla Raju as Kannan
- Meena as Karthyayani
- Kunchan as Shakkeer bhai
- Jagannatha Varma as Venu's uncle
- Thrissur Elsy as Venu's mother
- C. I. Paul as Sahadevan Muthalali
- Paravoor Bharathan as Adv K. S. Pilla
- Soumini as Mini
- Mini omanakuttan

== Soundtrack ==
The music was composed by Raveendran, A. T. Ummer, and Jerry Amaldev, and the lyrics written by Sasi Chittanjoor and Kaithapram.

No.	Song	Singers	Lyrics	Length (m:ss)
1	"Cherukulirala"	K. J. Yesudas, Sunanda	Sasi Chittanjoor	
2	"Omane Neeyoromal"	K. J. Yesudas	Sasi Chittanjoor	
3	"Pannagendra"	K. J. Yesudas	Sasi Chittanjoor	
4	"Sharee Meree Rajeshwaree"	K. J. Yesudas	Raveendran Master	
5	"Thennale"	Sunanda	Sasi Chittanjoor	
6	"Yamuna Nadiyaay"	K. J. Yesudas	Kaithapram	
