= The Sword of Liberty =

2017 Indian documentary film

The Sword of Liberty is a 2017 Indian documentary film directed by Shiny Benjamin. It follows the story of Veluthampi Dalava, a 19th-century Travancore leader who resisted British colonial rule. The documentary features Manju Warrier and was released via social media. It has won multiple awards, including the National Award for Best Historical Film and Best Music in the Non-Feature Film section at the 65th National Film Awards The film is produced by RC Suresh and its music was composed by Ramesh Narayanan, who also received a National Award for his work.

== Synopsis ==
The Sword of Liberty tells the story of Veluthampi Dalava, a 19th-century leader from Travancore who stood against British rule. The documentary follows Devaki as she delves into Dalava's life and the events leading to his death, believed to be a suicide at the age of 44. The film uses traditional Indian art forms like tholpavakoothu, villupattu, and thullal to bring Dalava's story to life.

== Awards ==
- National Award for Best Historical Film at the 65th National Film Awards
- National Award for Best Music in the non-features film
