= Umaanilayam =

- Directed by: Joshiy
- Written by: Cochin Haneefa
- Screenplay by: Cochin Haneefa
- Starring: Shankar; Manochithra; Radha; Shanavas
- Cinematography: Jayanan Vincent; J. Williams
- Edited by: K. Sankunni
- Music by: Shyam
- Production company: Hemnag Productions
- Distributed by: Hemnag Productions
- Release date: 23 November 1984
- Country: India
- Language: Malayalam

Umaanilayam is a 1984 Indian Malayalam Thriller film, directed by Joshiy. The film stars Shankar, Manochithra, Radha and Shanavas in the lead roles. It was the Malayalam debut of Radha. The film has musical score by Shyam.

== Plot ==
'UmaaNilayam' centers on a wealthy family living in a hill station. The story revolves around the arranged marriage of Uma-the daughter of the family patriarch, Jagannatha Varma—to Vinu. One rainy night, a murder occurs due to a mistake made by Uma. The film depicts the efforts Uma and the family's caretaker, Sivashankaran Pillai, make to cover up the crime.

== Cast ==
- Shankar as Vinu
- Radha as Uma
- Manochithra as Geetha
- Shanavas as Raju
- Jose as Rajan
- P.K. Abraham as Shiva Shankara Pilla
- Cochin Haneefa as Gopy
- Silk Smitha
- Prathapachandran as Jagathnadha Varma
- Kunchan as Rocky
- Ravi Kumar

== Soundtrack ==
The music was composed by Shyam and the lyrics were written by Poovachal Khader.

No.	Song	Singers	Lyrics	Length (m:ss)
1	"Madhumazhapozhiyum" (Sayoojya Piyoosha)	S. Janaki, Unni Menon	Poovachal Khader	
2	"Penne Neeyen"	P. Jayachandran, Vani Jairam, Unni Menon	Poovachal Khader	
3	"Radhe Ninte Krishnan"	P. Jayachandran, Vani Jairam	Poovachal Khader	
4	"Thottunokkiyal"	S. Janaki, P. Jayachandran	Poovachal Khader	
