= Chentrappinni =

- village
- Interactive map of Chentrappinni
- Coordinates: 10.355460°N 76.128090°E
- Country: India
- State: Kerala
- District: Thrissur

Languages
  - Official: Malayalam, English
- Time zone: UTC+5:30 (IST)
- PIN: 680687
- Telephone code: 048028
- Vehicle registration: KL-47
- Nearest city: kodungalloor
- Lok Sabha constituency: Thrissur

Chentrappinni is a small village in the district of Thrissur district, Kerala, India. Indian National Highway 66 passes through Chentrappinni.

Chentrappinni is 40 kilometres (25 mi) away from Kochi International Airport, 50 km (31 mi) from Edapally, 28 km (17 mi) from Thrissur Railway station and 31 km (19 mi) away from Guruvayoor Railway Station.

There is a senior secondary school, a CBSE School, and a government school.

Vadakkumpuram vishnumaya temple is in the town.
