= Kaaliya Mardhanam =

- Promotional poster designed by R. K.
- Directed by: J. Williams
- Written by: Pappanamkodu Lakshmanan
- Produced by: Thiruppathi Chettiyar
- Starring: Shankar; Nedumudi Venu; Mohanlal; Sathyakala; Jose Prakash; Sankaradi; Lalu Alex
- Cinematography: J. Williams
- Edited by: K. Sankunni
- Music by: K. J. Joy
- Production company: Evershine Productions
- Distributed by: Evershine Release
- Release date: 6 August 1982
- Country: India
- Language: Malayalam

Kaaliya Mardhanam (transl. Thrashing Kaliya) is a 1982 Indian Malayalam-language crime thriller film directed and filmed by J. Williams, written by Pappanamkodu Lakshmanan and produced by Thiruppathi Chettiyar. Starring Shankar, Nedumudi Venu, Mohanlal, Sathyakala, Jose Prakash, Sankaradi and Lalu Alex. The film features music composed by K. J. Joy. The film was a huge success at the box office.

== Plot ==
Ramu, a taxi driver, loves his cousin Geetha. But Geetha is in love with Sreeni, the son of DSP Menon and her college mate. Johnny, Rahim, Vishnu, and Kannan are spoiled brats of wealthy parents who are Geetha's and Sreeni's college mates.

Geetha's mother fixes her marriage with Ramu, which disturbs both Geetha and Sreeni. The mischievous gang offers help to the lovers to get them married with an ulterior motive. Believing the words of the pranksters, the lovers reach them and Geetha gets severely raped by the pranksters and dies.

The gang succeeds in accusing Ramu for the murder and gives evidence against him, which results in conviction with life imprisonment to Ramu. Ramu jumps from the prison to take revenge against the real culprits and one by one gets killed. DSP Menon suspects Ramu as the killer.

Three people are killed and Ramu at last reaches to the 4th one, Johnny, who is the son of a judge, but fails to kill him. Johnny follows Ramu and reaches a haunted place. On information, Menon arrives there and finds Johnny killed.

What happens next keeps both Menon, and the audience totally bewildered as a sudden revelation occurs, that the killer wasn't ramu but it was actually all Sreeni

== Cast ==
- Shankar as Ramu
- Nedumudi Venu as Sreeni
- Mohanlal as Johnny
- Jose Prakash as DSP Menon
- Lalu Alex as Kannan
- Murali as Rahim
- Jagathy Sreekumar as Vishnu @ Swami
- Sathyakala as Geetha
- Shivaji as Venus Raju, a photographer
- Kaviyoor Ponnamma
- Anuradha as Dancer
- Anil Thomas as Kattupothu Chandhapan

== Soundtrack ==
The music was composed by K. J. Joy and the lyrics were written by Pappanamkodu Lakshmanan and Poovachal Khader.

No.	Song	Singers	Lyrics	Length
1	"Madam Kollum"	Vani Jairam	Pappanamkodu Lakshmanan	
2	"Njanoru Thapaswini"	Chorus, S. P. Sailaja	Pappanamkodu Lakshmanan	
3	"Premavathi Nin Vazhiyil"	K. J. Yesudas	Poovachal Khader	
4	"Pushyaraagatheril"	P. Susheela	Pappanamkodu Lakshmanan	
