= Swantham Sarika =

Indian Malayalam-language movie

- Directed by: Ambili
- Written by: Ambili
- Screenplay by: Ambili
- Produced by: P. Muhammad Moosa
- Starring: Venu Nagavally; Manochithra; Sukumari; Adoor Bhasi
- Cinematography: Madhu Ambat
- Edited by: M. V. Natarajan
- Music by: Kannur Rajan
- Production company: Best Movie Makers
- Distributed by: Best Movie Makers
- Release date: 23 November 1984
- Country: India
- Language: Malayalam

Swantham Sarika is a 1984 Indian Malayalam-language movie directed by Ambili. The film was and produced by P. Muhammad Moosa. Venu Nagavally, Manochithra, Sukumari and Adoor Bhasi in the lead roles.

The film won the best singer award of Kerala state film awards in 1984 for K. J. Yesudas.

== Cast ==
- Venu Nagavally
- Manochithra
- Sukumari
- Adoor Bhasi
- Bharath Gopi
- Sudha
- Kunchan
- Kuttyedathi Vilasini
- M. S. Thripunithura
- Mala Aravindan
- Ravi Menon
- Sumithra

== Soundtrack ==
No.	Song	Lyrics	Music	Singers
1	"Aa Viral Nulliyaal"	P. Bhaskaran	Kannur Rajan	S. Janaki
2	"Aadya Chumbanathil"	P. Bhaskaran	Kannur Rajan	K. J. Yesudas, S. Janaki
3	"Aadyachumbanathil"	P. Bhaskaran	Kannur Rajan	K. J. Yesudas, S. Janaki
4	"Ee Marubhoovil Poomaram"	P. Bhaskaran	Kannur Rajan	K. J. Yesudas

=== Award song ===
- Ee Marubhoovil Poomaram
