= Annanukku Jai (1989 film) =

- Poster
- Directed by: Gangai Amaran
- Written by: Gangai Amaran
- Produced by: D. Raveendran; C. Jagatha
- Starring: Arjun; Seetha
- Cinematography: A. Sabapathi
- Edited by: B. Lenin; V. T. Vijayan
- Music by: Ilaiyaraaja
- Production company: Sri Vijaya Jagathambal Films
- Release date: 5 July 1989
- Country: India
- Language: Tamil

Annanukku Jai is a 1989 Indian Tamil-language film, written and directed by Gangai Amaran. The film stars Arjun and Seetha. It was released on 5 July 1989, and failed at the box office.

== Cast ==
- Arjun
- Seetha
- Kiruthika
- Radha Ravi
- Shanmugasundaram
- Vennira Aadai Moorthy
- Chinni Jayanth
- Charle
- M. S. Bhaskar
- Gandhimathi

== Production ==
The film was made around the same time as Karakattakkaran (1989). Gangai Amaran felt that he had put a lot of effort into making Annanukku Jai unlike he did in Karakattakkaran.; however, while the latter film was successful, the former was not.

== Soundtrack ==
Soundtrack was composed by Ilaiyaraaja. The song "Enakkoru Magan Pirappan" is set to Mohanam raga.

Song	Singers	Lyrics
"Solai Ilanguyile"	Malaysia Vasudevan, K. S. Chithra	Gangai Amaran
"Un Mela"	Gangai Amaran	Gangai Amaran
"Annanukku Jey"	S. P. Balasubrahmanyam, Saibaba, Sundarrajan	Ilaiyaraaja
"Anne Ippo"	Saibaba, Sundarrajan, Gangai Amaran	Gangai Amaran
"Enakkoru Magan Pirappan"	S. P. Balasubrahmanyam	Gangai Amaran
"Sokkanukku Aasapattu"	K. S. Chithra, Uma Ramanan	Gangai Amaran
"Ponmani Ponmanikku"	S. P. Balasubrahmanyam, K. S. Chithra	Gangai Amaran
