= Ee Vazhi Mathram =

- Promotional Poster
- Directed by: Ravi Gupthan
- Written by: Thoppil Sebastian
- Screenplay by: Thoppil Sebastian
- Produced by: Thoppil Sebastian
- Starring: Shankar; Sukumaran; Sathyakala; Sukumari
- Cinematography: Vipin Das
- Music by: Shyam
- Production company: Priyathama Films
- Distributed by: Priyathama Films
- Release date: 24 June 1983
- Country: India
- Language: Malayalam

Ee Vazhi Mathram is a 1983 Indian Malayalam-language film, directed by Ravi Gupthan and produced by Thoppil Sebastian. The film stars Shankar, Sukumaran, Sathyakala and Sukumari. The film has musical score by Shyam.

== Cast ==
- Shankar as Babu
- Sukumaran as Rajan
- Sathyakala as Geetha
- Sukumari as Geetha's mother
- Kalaranjini as Sharada
- Sathaar as Mohanan
- Kuthiravattam Pappu as Appu
- Meena as Rajan's mother
- P. K. Abraham as Menon
- Kundara Johny as Johny
- Paravoor Bharathan as Vasu
- Thrissur Elsy as Sarasamma
- Viji Thampi as Police Inspector
- Vijayalakshmi as Bhavani
- Baby Sangeetha as Rajani

== Soundtrack ==
The music was composed by Shyam and the lyrics were written by Kallada Sasi.

No.	Song	Singers	Lyrics	Length (m:ss)
1	"Aashaa Malarukal"	K. J. Yesudas	Kallada Sasi	
2	"Kanni Veyilu"	S. Janaki, P. Jayachandran	Kallada Sasi	
3	"Naayika Nee"	P. Jayachandran	Kallada Sasi	
4	"Pulippaalu Veno"	C. O. Anto	Kallada Sasi	
