= Mazha Nilaavu =

- Directed by: S. A. Salam
- Written by: Perumpadavam Sreedharan
- Screenplay by: Perumpadavam Sreedharan
- Produced by: K. A. Divakaran
- Starring: Prem Nazir; Jagathy Sreekumar; Bahadoor; Poornima Jayaram Mohammed Ali(Maali)
- Cinematography: Anandakuttan
- Edited by: K. Sankunni
- Music by: Raveendran
- Production company: Dili Pictures
- Distributed by: Dili Pictures
- Release date: 7 January 1983
- Country: India
- Language: Malayalam

Mazha Nilaavu is a 1983 Indian Malayalam film, directed by S. A. Salam and produced by K. A. Divakaran. The film stars Prem Nazir, Jagathy Sreekumar, Bahadoor and Poornima Jayaram in the lead roles. The film has musical score by Raveendran.

== Cast ==
- Prem Nazir as Singapore Menon
- Jagathy Sreekumar as Pushpangathan
- Bahadoor as Abdulla
- Poornima Jayaram as Susheela
- Shanavas as Jayan
- Manochithra as Poornima
- Sankaradi as Sankara Pilla
- Meena as Meenakshi
- Mala Aravindan as Mathukutty
- Praveena as Santha
- Mohammed Ali

== Soundtrack ==
The music was composed by Raveendran and the lyrics were written by Poovachal Khader and Chunakkara Ramankutty.

No.	Song	Singers	Lyrics	Length (m:ss)
1	"College Beautykkoraasha"	K. J. Yesudas, K. P. Brahmanandan	Poovachal Khader	
2	"Ninne Kandu Ullam Kollum"	K. J. Yesudas, Chorus	Poovachal Khader	
3	"Paathiraakkaattu Vannu"	S. Janaki	Chunakkara Ramankutty	
4	"Raavil Raaga Nilavil"	S. Janaki	Poovachal Khader	
5	"Rithumathiyaay Thelimaanam"	K. J. Yesudas, Latha Raju	Poovachal Khader	
6	"Virinjittum Viriyaatha"	S. Janaki, Chorus, Kausalya	Poovachal Khader	
