= Shiny Benjamin =

Indian film director

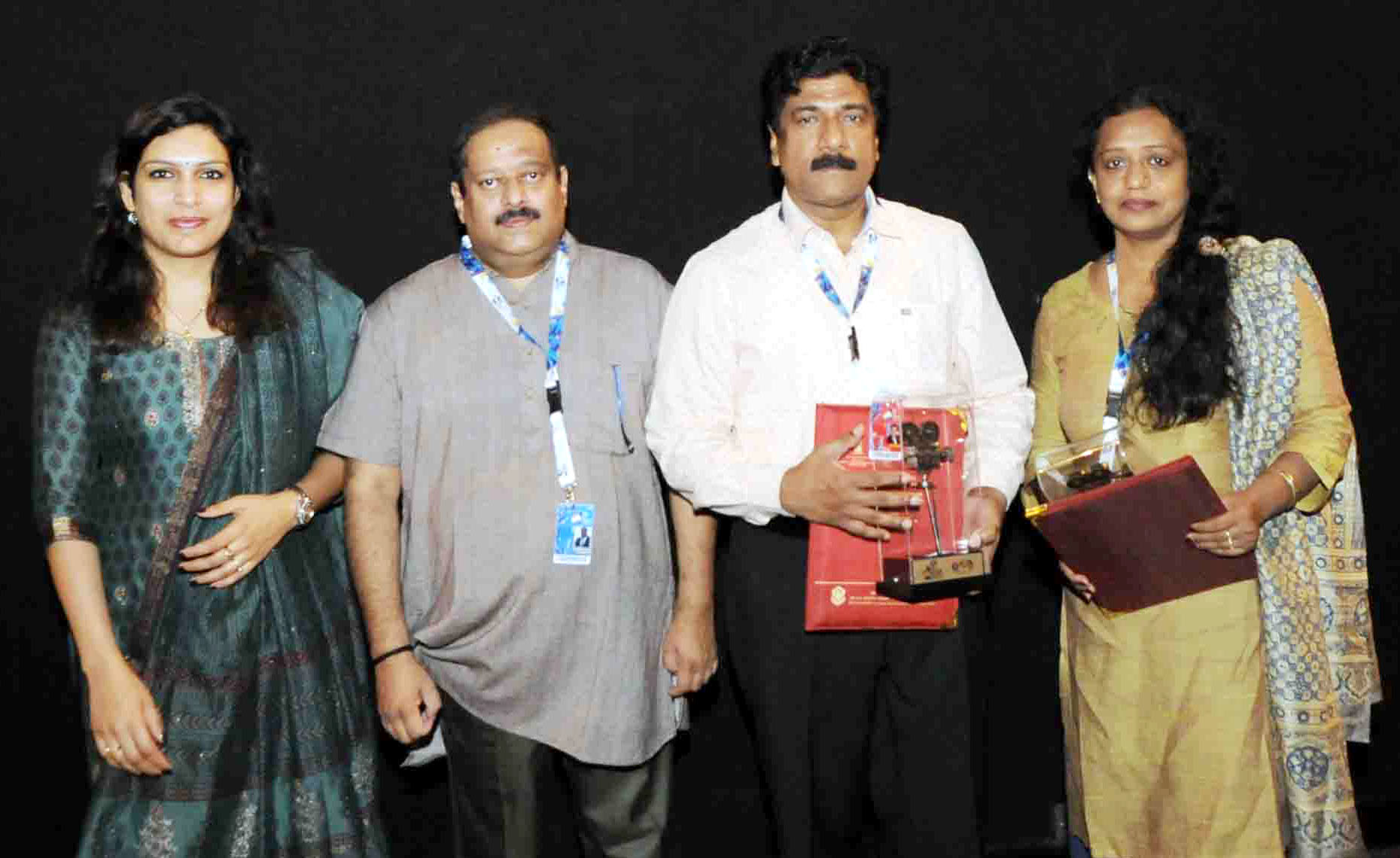
- Shiny Benjamin, IFFI (2016)
- Born: Shiny Benjamin; Kollam, Kerala, India
- Occupation: Film director
- Awards: National Film Award for Best Biographical Film 2018

Shiny Benjamin, (also known Shiny Jacob Benjamin born in Karavaloor, Punalur, Kollam) is a National Award-winning Indian director of documentaries and docufictions, from Trivandrum, Kerala.

== Life ==
Shiny Benjamin began her career as journalist, and had been a documentary director since 1999. She worked as a feature writer with the Malayalam newspapers Malayala Manorama and Mathrubhumi before joining Asianet (TV channel), the first Malayalam satellite television channel. Later, she worked with Indiavision, the first news channel in Malayalam, as a chief producer for the television channel JaiHind TV and Jaihind Middle East. Shiny is the younger daughter of K.O.Benjamin and Sosamma Benjamin. Her education began at Karavaloor AMMHS and continued at St. Gorety Girls High School, followed by St. John's College, Anchal. She has been honoured with 20 awards including five National Awards and eight Kerala State Film Awards for documentaries and docufictions.

== Filmography ==
Year	Title	Script	Short Description
2017	The Swords of Liberty	Beear Prasad	Describes the life and death of Velu Thambi Dalawa.
2014	In Return: Just a Book	Paul Zacharia	A docufiction inspired by Indian author Perumpadam Sreedharan’s novel on Fyodor Dostoevsky.
2013	Translated Lives - A Migration Revisited	Paul Zacharia	A documentary about the lives of Malayali women who emigrated to Germany in the 1960s to become nurses.
2012	Between a Rock and a Hard Place	Paul Zacharia	A documentary about the lives of five Kerala women.
2010	Ottayal (One Woman: Alone)	Shiny Benjamin	Describes the life of Daya Bai who fought for the right of Gonds in Madhya Pradesh.
2006	Bhagya-Singer in a Democracy	Shiny Benjamin	Life of a migrant young woman from Karnataka who makes a living by singing on trains.
2005	Nizhalukal (Shadows)	Shiny Benjamin	Tells the story of the lives of young victims of sexual abuse and rape.
2004	Mazha (Rain)	Shiny Benjamin	Describes the monsoons of Kerala.
2003	Avan (He)	Shiny Benjamin	A film which explores the world of homosexual sex workers.
2002	Namukkum Avarkkum Idayil (In Between)	Shiny Benjamin	The film explores the topic of cruelty against animals.
2001	Murivunangatha Balyangal (Wounded Childhood)	Shiny Benjamin	A film on child abuse.
2001	Devil Worshippers	Shiny Benjamin	A documentary exploring the belief and practice of black magic in Kerala.
2000	Kanayi Kazchakal (Kanayis Artscape)	Shiny Benjamin	A brief study of the art and personality of Kanayi Kunhiraman, India’s foremost contemporary sculptor.

== Film festivals ==
- 2011 - MIFF Mumbai International Film Festival
- 2014 -11th Indian film festival, Stuttgart, Germany
- 2010 - IDSFK Competition Section, Thiruvananthapuram
- 2009 - SiGNS Film Festival for Short and Documentary films organized by Federation of Film Societies of India
- 2016 - International Film Festival of India
- 2016 - 64th International Film Festival (Delhi)
- 2016 - Pacific Meridian International Film Festival
- 2016 - Moscow Indian Film Festival, Moscow
- 2016 - Hindu Lit for Life, Chennai.
- 2016 - Kerala Literature Festival
- 2017 - Women’s Film Festival
- 2017 - Soorya Festival
- 2017 - Thasarak Literary Festival, Dubai
- 2017 - Sharjah International Film Festival for Children & Youth (sicff)
- 2017 - Mathrubhumi International Festival of Letters
- 2018 - International Documentary & Short Film Festival of Kerala
- 2018 - Women’s Film Festival
- 2018 - International Film Festival of India
- 2018 - Kolkata International Film Festival
- 2019 - Kerala Literature Festival
- 2019 - Soorya Festival
- 2019 - Mathrubhumi International Festival of Letters
- 2019 - Krithi Knowledge Festival
- 2019 - Kochi-Muziris Biennale

== Awards ==
- 2017 - The Sword of Liberty Kerala State Awards for the Best Documentary and Best Director
- 2017 - The Sword of Liberty National Film Award for Best Historical Reconstruction/Compilation Film.
- 2017 - National Film Award for the Best Biographical Film / Best Historical Reconstruction. (Non feature - Biographical Film)
- 2017 - National Film Award for the Best Music Direction-Background score. (Non feature - Biographical Film)
- 2014 - Translated Lives - A Migration Revisited Best Documentary Film Award at the 3rd Kolkata Shorts International Film Festival.
- 2014 - Translated Lives - A Migration Revisited The Laadly National Media Award for Gender Sensitivity.
- 2014 - In Return: Just a Book 64th for the Best Audiography to Ajith Abraham George.
- 2010 - Ottayal (One Woman Alone) National Film Awards for the Best Documentary.
- 2010 - Ottayal (One woman lone) Kerala State Award for Best Documentary.
- 2010 - Ottayal (One woman lone) Special Jury Award John Abraham International Festival for Documentaries and Short Films (Signs) & The Laadly National Media Award.
- 2006 - Bhagya, Singer in a Democracy Kerala State Award for Best Documentary.
- 2005 - Nizhalukal (Shadows) Kerala State Award for Best Documentary.
- 2004 - Mazha (Rain) Kerala State Special Jury Award for Documentary.
- 2003 - Avan (He) Kerala State Award for Best Documentary. & Kerala Film Critics Award for Best Documentary and Best Director.
- 2002 - Namukkum Avarkkum Idayil (In Between) Kerala State Award for Best Documentary on Topical Issues & Kerala Film Critics Award for Best Documentary and Best Director.
- 2001 - Murivunangatha Balyangal (Wounded Childhood) Kerala State Special Jury Film Award for Best Documentary.
