= Amme Narayana =

- Directed by: N. P. Suresh
- Written by: Purushan Alappuzha; Alappuzha Karthikeyan (dialogues)
- Screenplay by: Purushan Alappuzha; Irulamuthu Shankar
- Produced by: Purushan Alappuzha
- Starring: Srividya; Prem Nazir; Sukumaran; Baby Shalini
- Cinematography: P. N. Sundaram
- Edited by: N. P. Suresh
- Music by: A. T. Ummer
- Production company: Sreedevi Films
- Distributed by: Sreedevi Films
- Release date: 18 April 1984
- Country: India
- Language: Malayalam

Amme Narayana is a 1984 Indian Malayalam-language film, directed by N. P. Suresh and produced by Purushan Alappuzha. The film stars Srividya as Chottanikkara Amma, with Prem Nazir, Sukumaran and Baby Shalini in the lead supporting roles. The film has musical score by A. T. Ummer.

== Plot ==
Goddess Bhagavathi aids her devotees during their times of peril and provides them with relief from tumultuous situations.

== Cast ==
- Srividya as Chottanikkara Devi / Aadhi Paraashakthi / Lakshmi / Saraswathi / Parvathi
- Baby Shalini as dumb little girl
- Prem Nazir as Kannappan Vedan / Senadhipathi Chanthu / Vilwamangalam Swamikal
- Sukumaran as Suresh
- Jagannatha Varma as father of intellectually disabled girl
- Mala Aravindan as Kuttan Namboothiri
- Ranipadmini as Naanikkutti (Yakshi)
- Sathyakala as Rajeshwari
- Shanavas as Rajeshwari's husband
- Sumithra as Ponni, Kannappa's wife

== Soundtrack ==
The music was composed by A. T. Ummer and the lyrics were written by Poovachal Khader, Koorkkancheri Sugathan.

No.	Song	Singers	Lyrics	Length (m:ss)
1	"Amme Amme Malankurathiyamme"	K. J. Yesudas, Chorus	Poovachal Khader	
2	"Amme Naarayana"	K. J. Yesudas	Koorkkancheri Sugathan	
3	"Chandraarkka Vaameshwari Devi"	K. J. Yesudas	Poovachal Khader	
4	"Madhyannaarkka Sahasrakodi"	K. P. Brahmanandan		
5	"Manchaadikkutti Malavedakkutti"	Ambili, K. P. Brahmanandan	Poovachal Khader	
6	"Nithyaanandakari"	K. J. Yesudas		
7	"Sindooraaruna Vigrahaam"	K. P. Brahmanandan		
8	"Sreemad Chandana"	K. P. Brahmanandan		
