= Kerala Film Critics Association Award for Best Story =

Annual Indian film award

The Kerala Film Critics Association Award for Best Story is one of the annual awards given at the Kerala Film Critics Association Awards, recognising screenwriting excellence in Malayalam cinema.

== Winners ==
Year	Recipient	Film	Ref.
1977	Thoppil Bhasi	Yuddha Kandam	
1978	C. Radhakrishnan	Agni	
1979	Cherukad	Manninte Maril	
1980	Perumbadavam Sreedharan	Surya Daham	
1981	M. T. Vasudevan Nair	Valarthumrugangal	
1982	M. T. Vasudevan Nair	Vaarikuzhi	
1983	Perumbadavam Sreedharan	Ashtapadi	
1984	N. N. Pisharody	Vellam	
1985	M. T. Vasudevan Nair	Anubandham	
1986	Sreemoolanagaram Mohan	Ashtabandham	
1987	C. V. Sreeraman	Purushartham	
1988	Rugmini	Madhavikutty	
1989	Sreenivasan	Vadakkunokkiyantram	
1990	S. L. Puram Sadanandan	Kattukuthira	
1991	George Onakkoor	Yamanam	
1992	M. Mukundan	Daivathinte Vikrithikal	
1993	Zacharia	Vidheyan	
1994	S. Jayachandran Nair	Swaham	
1995	Cheriyan Kalpakavadi	Sakshyam	
1996	Sreekumar Arookutty	Desadanam	
1997	Lohithadas	Bhoothakkannadi	
1998	Renji Panicker	Janani	
1999	Jayaraj	Karunam	
2000	C. V. Balakrishnan	Kochu Kochu Santhoshangal	
2001	Suresh Poduval	Achaneyanenikkishtam	
2002	Mani Shornur	Aabharanachaarthu	
2003	Ranjan Pramod	Manassinakkare	
2004	T. A. Razzaq	Perumazhakkalam	
2005	Aryadan Shoukath	Daivanamathil	
2008	Aryadan Shoukath	Vilapangalkkappuram	
2009	Cheriyan Kalpakavadi	Bharya Swantham Suhruthu	
2010	Mohan Raghavan	T. D. Dasan Std. VI B	
2022	M. Mukundan	Mahaveeryar	

== See also ==
- Kerala Film Critics Association Award for Best Screenplay
