= Shanawas =

Indian actor (1954–2025)

- Born: 1954; Trivandrum, Travancore–Cochin, India
- Died: 4 August 2025 (aged 71); Thiruvananthapuram, Kerala, India
- Occupation: Actor
- Years active: 1977–2025
- Spouse: Ayisha
- Children: Ajith Khan, Shameer Khan
- Parents: Prem Nazir (father); Habeeba Beevi (mother)
- Relatives: Prem Nawas (uncle)

Shanawas Prem Nazir (1954 – 4 August 2025) was an Indian actor who appeared in Malayalam films. He was the son of the Malayalam actor Prem Nazir. He had acted in more than 50 Malayalam films.

== Background ==
Shanawas was born at Thiruvananthapuram, to Prem Nazir and his wife Habeeba Beevi. He had three sisters. He had his primary education from Chirayakeezhu English Medium School, Montfort School, Yercaud and pursued a master's degree in English literature from The New College, Chennai. He made his debut in Malayalam film Prema Geethangal in 1981. He made his comeback through the 2011 Malayalam film, China Town.

== Personal life and death ==
Shanawas was settled in Malaysia. Shanawas's wife Ayisha Beevi is the daughter of the eldest sister of Prem Nazir, Late Suleikha Beevi. The couple had two sons, Shameer Khan and Ajith Khan. Shameer tried his luck in the Malayalam movie Uppukandam Brothers Back in Action but was unsuccessful and is now working as a Manager and Vlogger in Malaysia. Ajith Khan is working in Australia.

Shanawas died at a private hospital following prolonged health issues, on 4 August 2025, at the age of 71.

== Selected filmography ==
Year	Title	Role	Notes	Ref.
1981	Premageethangal	Ajith		
1981	Garjanam	Murali	Simultaneously shot in Tamil as Garjanai	
1982	Aasha	Boban		
1982	Koritharicha Naal			
1982	Mylanji	Mansoor		
1982	Gaanam			
1982	Ivan Oru Simham	Prabha		
1982	Irattimadhuram	Surendran		
1983	Aadhipathyam	Prakash		
1983	Rathilayam	Shanker		
1983	Justice Raja	Sankar		
1983	Mazha Nilaavu	Jayan		
1983	Ee Yugam	Prasad		
1983	Himam	Renji		
1983	Prathijnja	Ravindran		
1983	Prasnam Gurutharam	Dr. Ashok		
1983	Maniyara	Ayyoob		
1983	Mouna Raagam	Raju		
1984	Amme Narayana			
1984	Kadamattathachan	Kunjali		
1984	Ningalil Oru Sthree			
1984	Umaanilayam	Raju		
1984	Velichamillatha Veedhi			
1985	Uyirthezhunnelppu			
1985	Mukhyamantri			
1985	Shantam Bheekaram			
1985	Orikkal Oridathu	Nasser		
1985	Aazhi			
1985	Onnam Prathi Olivil			
1986	Bhagavan			
1987	Kavithai Paada Neramillai		Tamil film	
1987	Jaathi Pookkal		Tamil film	
1987	Ellaavarkkum Nanmakal			
1987	Mangalyachaarthu	Rahul		
1988	Chithram	Ravi		
1989	Lal Americayil	Babu		
1989	Jeevitham Oru Raagam	Rajesh		
1989	Maharajavu			
1989	Eenam Thettatha Kattaru	Maruthan		
1990	Ragam Sree Ragam			
1990	Arhatha	Prasad		
1990	Midhya			
1991	Veendum Oru Adhyarathri			
1991	Neelagiri	Sekhar		
1991	Koumara Swapnangal			
1991	Inspector Balram			
2003	Kaliyodam			
2009	Nammal Thammil	Lecturer		
2010	Oridathoru Postman	Doctor		
2010	Kanyakumari Express	Satharam Sethu		
2011	China Town	David Zachariah's Father		
2011	Veeraputhran	K. P. Kesava Menon		
2013	Dolls	Assistant of Guru		
2013	Rebecca Uthup Kizhakkemala			
2013	Zachariayude Garbhinikal	Zaira's father		
2014	Garbhasreeman	Malu's Father		
2015	Kumbasaram	Paul Varghese/Abdulla		
2015	At Once			
2017	Kuppivala			
2019	March Randam Vyazham	G. K. Menon		
2022	Jana Gana Mana	Sreeni		

== Television ==
- Shankupushpam (Asianet)
- Kadamattathu Kathanar (Asianet)
- Ammathottil (Asianet)
- Vikramadithyan (Asianet)
- Veluthakathreena/Kanalpoovu (Kairali TV)
- Summer in America (Kairali TV)
- Sathyameva Jayathe (Surya TV)
- Manasariyathe (Surya TV)
