= Neelima =

Neelima is a female given name. Notable people with the name include:

- Neelima Azeem (born 1958), Indian actress
- Neelima Rani (born 1983), Indian actress
- Neelima Sinha (born 1954), American botanist
- Neelima Katiyar, Indian politician
- Neelima Tirumalasetti (born 1975), Indian film and television producer
- Neelima Gupte, Indian physicist
