= Naduvazhikal =

- Poster designed by Gayathri Ashokan
- Directed by: Joshiy
- Written by: S. N. Swami
- Produced by: G. P. Vijayakumar
- Starring: Mohanlal; Thilakan; Madhu; Sithara; Rupini
- Cinematography: Jayanan Vincent
- Edited by: K. Sankunni
- Music by: Shyam
- Production company: Seven Arts Films
- Distributed by: Seven Arts Release
- Release date: 5 May 1989
- Running time: 155 minutes
- Language: Malayalam

Naduvazhikal (transl. Rulers of the land) is a 1989 Indian Malayalam-language action crime film directed by Joshiy and written by S. N. Swami. The film was loosely based on The Godfather. It tells the story of Arjun (Mohanlal), who takes up the business empire of his father Ananthan (Madhu), who has been sent to jail, and his clashes with his father's rivals, the Chekkudi brothers. The film also features Murali, Devan, Thilakan, Kuthiravattom Pappu, Jagathy Sreekumar and Manianpilla Raju in supporting roles. The music was composed by Shyam. The film was released on 5 May 1989 to positive reviews and was one of the highest-grossing films of the year. The climax of the film was highly appreciated by critics and audience like.

== Plot ==
Arjun is enjoying his student life in Bangalore city with his friends and his girlfriend Rosemary. Back home his father Ananthan is an affluent businessman with a shady past. Ananthan is constantly being targeted by Varkey, Mathukutty and Cherian (Chekkudi Brothers).

Ananthan is arrested one day and sent to prison. Arjun is forced to come from Bangalore to release his father. But his first attempt fails. Chekkudi Brothers, with the help of new Home minister Gopalan Pillai and CI Bharathan tries to catch Arjun and include him in many cases. But he overcomes everything. At last Arjun releases his father, but Chekkudi kills Ananthan and Arjun finishes Chekkudi brothers except Varkey. But Arjun is sadly arrested and hopes to return home one day eventually

== Cast ==
- Mohanlal as Arjun
- Madhu as Ananthan, Arjun's Father
- Thilakan as Shankaran / Shankarettan, Ananthan's Friend and Helper
- Janardhanan as Aasan, Ananthan and Arjun's Assistant
- Rupini as Rosemary, Arjun's Lover
- Sithara as Rema, Arjun's Sister
- Kuthiravattam Pappu as K.C., Ananthan's Helper
- Maniyanpilla Raju as Ravi, Arjun's Friend
- Vijayaraghavan as DYSP Sanjeev Menon
- Murali as Chekkudi Cherian
- Devan as Chekkudi Mathew / Mathukutty, Cherian's Brother
- Babu Namboothiri as Abraham Varkey / Varkeychan
- Prathapachandran as Panicker
- Jagathy Sreekumar as Bava, Chekkudi Brothers Assistant
- Jagannatha Varma as DYSP Pavithran
- K. P. A. C. Azeez as CI Bharathan
- K. P. A. C. Sunny as Koshy
- Kollam Thulasi as Home Minister Gopala Pillai
- Vijayan as Stephen, Rosemary's Father
- Kunchan as Antony
- Ravi Menon as Shekharan
- M.S. Thripunithura as MLA Chandradas
- Valsala Menon as Dr. Rachael George, Rosemary's Aunt
- James as Balan, Company Auditor
- Santhadevi as Koshy's Mother
- Alex as Sub Inspector of Police James

== Trivia ==
- Simhasanam with Prithviraj Sukumaran was initially planned as the remake of Naduvazhikal, but on scripting, it deviated so much from the original story that, it was no longer a rehashed version of the 1989 hit. So the makers of Simhasanam made it as a loosely based adaptation of Mario Puzo's The Godfather.
