= Oru Kudakeezhil =

- Poster designed by Gayathri Ashokan
- Directed by: Joshiy
- Written by: A. R. Mukesh; Kaloor Dennis (dialogues)
- Screenplay by: Kaloor Dennis
- Produced by: Sajan
- Starring: Shankar; Madhavi; Nedumudi Venu; Sukumari; Thilakan; Venu Nagavally
- Cinematography: Anandakuttan
- Edited by: K. Sankunni
- Music by: Johnson
- Production company: Saj Movies
- Distributed by: Saj Movies
- Release date: 9 December 1985
- Country: India
- Language: Malayalam

Oru Kudakeezhil is a 1985 Indian Malayalam-language film, directed by Joshiy and produced by Sajan. The film stars Shankar, Madhavi and Nedumudi Venu, while Venu Nagavally, Sukumari, Thilakan and Rohini play supporting roles. The film has musical score by Johnson.

== Cast ==
- Shankar as Ravi Nair
- Madhavi as Prof. Vijayalakshmi Nair
- Nedumudi Venu as Venukuttan Nair
- Sukumari as Bharathiyamma
- Thilakan as Kurup
- Venu Nagavally as Unnikrishnan
- Rohini as Sreedevi Nair
- Prathapachandran
- Baby Shalini as Sreedevi Nair
- James as Nair
- KPAC Sunny as Adv. Viswanathan Nair
- Lalu Alex as CI Felix Joseph
- Mala Aravindan as Pushpangathan
- Paravoor Bharathan as Koshy
- Thodupuzha Vasanthi as Saraswathi Nair

== Soundtrack ==
The music was composed by Johnson with lyrics by Poovachal Khader.

No.	Song	Singers	Lyrics	Length (m:ss)
1	"Anuraagini"	K. J. Yesudas	Poovachal Khader	
2	"Bhoomippennin Poomey"	K. J. Yesudas, Vani Jairam	Poovachal Khader	
3	"Pinakkamenthe"	Vani Jairam	Poovachal Khader	
