= Moorkhan (film) =

Moorkhan (1980)
- Theatrical release poster
- Directed by: Joshiy
- Written by: Pappanamkodu Lakshmanan
- Screenplay by: Pappanamkodu Lakshmanan
- Produced by: Arifa Hassan for Arifa Enterprises
- Starring: Jayan, Seema, Sumalatha, Sathar, Pappu, Cochin Haneefa etc.
- Cinematography: N. A. Thara
- Edited by: K. Sankunni
- Music by: A. T. Ummer
- Production company: Arifa Enterprises
- Distributed by: Arifa Enterprises
- Release date: 21 November 1980
- Country: India
- Language: Malayalam

Moorkhan is a 1980 Indian Malayalam-language action drama film directed by Joshiy and produced by Arifa Hassan under the banner of Arifa Enterprises. It stars Jayan and Seema in the lead roles along with Cochin Haneefa, Prathapachandran and Balan K. Nair in supporting roles. The film has musical score by A. T. Ummer with cinematography done by N. A. Thara. It revolves around Vinod and his revenge against his sister's murderers. It was a major commercial success.

== Plot ==
An escaped convict Vinod narrates his story to his rescuers, the forest guard and his daughter Raji. Vinod dotes on his little sister Rajani. He does not approve of Rajani's outspoken friend Vilasini. When he learns that Rajani had been murdered by her boy friend who is also Vilasini's brother, he swears vengeance on the entire family. The boy friend is promptly murdered by Vinod. But his fake love for Vilasini soon after awakens the suspicions of the investigating police officer and he is foiled in his murder. He persuades Vilasini into eloping with him. It is then that they both learn that Vilasini's brother had been innocent. It was their father who had murdered Rajani. Vinod's attempts to murder him is foiled as he's arrested by the police. After he bids goodbye to the guard and his daughter, Vinod makes his final attempt to kill his sister's murderer.

== Cast ==
- Jayan as Vinod
- Seema as Vilasini
- Cochin Haneefa as Rajeevan, Police Officer
- Prathapachandran as Narendran, Forest Guard
- Sathaar as Rajan, Vilasini's brother
- Balan K. Nair as Chandrasekhar, Vilasini's father
- Kuthiravattam Pappu as Kuttappan
- Shobhana (Roja Ramani) as Rajani
- Suchitra
- Sumalatha as Raji
- Jaggu as Robert

== Production ==
The film's story was developed by Joshiy, Hassan and Cochin Haneefa on the sets of Hassan's Benz Vasu. The film was planned to be directed by Hassan. After narrating the script of the film to Jayan, he suggested that Joshiy direct the film. However, the film's distributor, Raj Pictures rejected the proposal as Joshiy was considered an unlucky director as his debut directorial, Tiger Salim was a commercial failure. They wanted Hassan to direct the film and told him that they would not co-operate if Joshiy was made film director. Hassan suggested that they direct the project under the name of Joshiy-Hassan. However, Joshiy did not agree and offered to ghost direct the project. However, Jayan did not allow that and threatened to walk out of the project if Joshiy wasn't made director.

== Release ==
The film was released on 21 November 1980. It was one of Jayan's posthumous releases. The film was major commercial success and was a breakthrough in Joshiy's career.

== Soundtrack ==
The music was composed by A. T. Ummer and the lyrics were written by B. Manikyam.

No.	Song	Singers	Lyrics	Length (m:ss)
1	"Aakasha Gangaatheerathu"	K. J. Yesudas	B. Manikyam	
2	"En Kannil Mandaram"	P. Jayachandran, Chorus	B. Manikyam	
3	"Shaarada Sandhyaykku"	K. J. Yesudas, S. Janaki	B. Manikyam	
