= Balidaan (1985 film) =

1985 film

- Theatrical release poster
- Directed by: S. A. Chandrasekhar
- Written by: Kader Khan (dialogues); Indeevar
- Screenplay by: S. A. Chandrasekhar
- Story by: Shoba Chandrasekhar
- Based on: Raktham (Malayalam)(1981) by Kaloor Dennis
- Produced by: Salim Akhtar
- Starring: Jeetendra; Sridevi
- Cinematography: V. Durgaprasad
- Edited by: Gowtham Raju
- Music by: Bappi Lahiri
- Production company: Aftab Pictures Pvt Ltd
- Release date: 26 April 1985
- Running time: 136 minutes
- Country: India
- Language: Hindi

Balidaan (transl. Sacrifice) is a 1985 Hindi-language action film, produced by Salim under the Aftab Pictures banner and directed by S.A. Chandra Shekaran. It stars Jeetendra, Sridevi and music composed by Bappi Lahari. The film is remake of the Malayalam film Raktham (1981).

== Cast ==
- Shammi Kapoor as Retired Major Prem Kishan
- Jeetendra as Inspector Vijay Prem Kishan
- Sridevi as Uma
- Kader Khan as Bade
- Shakti Kapoor as Johny "Chhote"
- Dina Pathak as Bua
- Asrani as Advocate Ghaswala
- Vijay Arora
- Pinchoo Kapoor as Jagmohan
- Shubha Khote as Janki
- Birbal as Constable
- Brahm Bhardwaj as Judge
- Bharat Kapoor as Jaggu
- Gurbachan Singh
- Bindu
- Anuradha as Item Dancer

== Soundtrack ==
All songs were written by Farooq Kaiser while "Aaja Ek Ho Ja" was penned by Indeevar.

Song	Singer
"Aaja, Ek Ho Ja, Main Tujh Mein, Tu Mujh Mein Aake Kho Ja"	Kishore Kumar, Asha Bhosle
"Jaan-E-Man Humko Aaj Pyar Karne Ka Licence Mil Gaya"	Kishore Kumar, Asha Bhosle
"Kare Kaun, Bhare Kaun"	Asha Bhosle
"More Saajan Pyaar Karoon Tohe"	Asha Bhosle
"Intaqam, Intaqam"	Shabbir Kumar
"O Mere Sajan"	S. Janaki
