= Aarambham (1982 film) =

- Poster
- Directed by: Joshiy
- Written by: Cochin Haneefa; Pappanamkodu Lakshmanan (dialogues)
- Screenplay by: Pappanamkodu Lakshmanan
- Produced by: Thiruppathi Chettiyar
- Starring: Prem Nazir; Madhu; Srividya; KP Ummer; Sukumaran; MG Soman
- Edited by: K. Sankunni
- Music by: Shyam; A. T. Ummer; KJ Joy; Shankar–Ganesh
- Production company: Evershine
- Distributed by: Evershine
- Release date: 1 September 1982
- Country: India
- Language: Malayalam

Aarambham is a 1982 Indian Malayalam film, written by Cochin Haneefa, directed by Joshiy and produced by Thiruppathi Chettiyar. with an ensemble cast starring Prem Nazir, Madhu, Sukumaran, M. G. Soman, K. P. Ummer, Srividya, Sumalatha and Rajalakshmi. The film has a musical score by unusually using four music directors, namely Shyam, A. T. Ummer, K. J. Joy and Shankar–Ganesh, each of whom directed one song each. The cinematography was handled by N. A. Thara, while editing was done by K. Sankunni.

Aarambham was released in theatres on 1 September 1982 on the occasion of Onam. Upon release, the film received highly positive reviews from critics. The film was a super hit, even as it faced stiff competition from the high budget Prem Nazir starrer Padayottam. The film was a breakthrough for Joshiy.

Aaramabham was later remade in Hindi by Joshiy himself in 1984, called Dharm Aur Qanoon, starring Dharmendra and Rajesh Khanna which was a critical and commercial success. The film bought Joshiy national recognition. It was remade in Tamil too as Ezhuthatha Sattangal which was directed by veteran director K. Shankar, with Sivaji Ganesan in the lead role. The Tamil version was also a major commercial success.

== Plot ==
Justice Devarajan lives in a bungalow with his wife Sharda and a son named Rajan. Diwan was a very famous advocate in his younger days and today has become a name to reckon with. His admirers include the superintendent of police Kader whom he knows since his younger days. Diwan has been appointed as the judge in the court. Diwan's wife Shanta considers Rahim Khan as her brother. Rahim visits Diwan's house daily to give her flowers to wear and for presenting them to her house temple.

Diwan doesn't get along with his son Rajan even though both love each other a lot. Eventually Rajan moves out to live in a nearby slum area with Rahim in his house. Dr. Bashir Khan is Rahim's brother and lives in a bungalow next to Rahim's small house. It's not that Rahim and Bashir are not attached to each other: Bashir has become a doctor thanks to Rahim's efforts. Rahim wants to spend the rest of life staying in that small house, as this is the house where his wife died. It is also a practice that Diwan, Rahim and Shardha have breakfast together in the morning and sometimes Kader joins them at Diwan's house. Bashir has been in love with Reshma since their school days and this fact is unknown only to Rahim Khan. All others including Reshma's father Kader and his closest friend Justice Diwan and his family is aware of them being in love.

Bashir Khan hopes to marry Reshma soon. Meanwhile, Rajan starts loving a fisherman's girl named Shanta. Rahim Khan makes a living for himself by collecting Hafta from the fisherman; he saves them from the Bhuree and his men who keep attacking the fisherman for they want them to vacate the premises and want to construct a building complex. Bhuree's men fear Rahim Khan so they give warnings to fishermen in his absence from the village. Later in a case, Diwan sentences Tejaa, the head of the group of Buree and his men to life imprisonment. But Tejaa manages to get bail with help of his advocate. After coming out of the prison, Tejaa decides to take revenge from Diwan. Within a few days Dr. John, Bashir's senior, is killed and the evidence points at Bashir being at the place of crime (the worker had seen Bashir with a knife covered in blood). Bashir is arrested and, in the court, Justice Diwan finds him guilty after examining the witnesses and orders that he be hanged. Bashir gets lodged in jail. Rahim asks Diwan to help Bashir and to prove somehow that he is innocent. Diwan says he knows Bashir being Rahim's brother and being a doctor cannot commit the crime, but he as a judge has to announce judgments according to evidence. Bhuree has an eye on Shanta, too, and so decides to give her father much wine. When he is intoxicated, he rapes Shanta. The next day Bhurre is found dead, and the evidence points to Rajan, who is arrested and produced before Justice Diwan, who finds him guilty, and sentences him to death. Rajan says to his mother that he has not killed Bhuree and that he would have been happy to kill Bhuree.

An alteration takes place between Sharda and Diwan where Diwan shows his helplessness and he says he prefers duty over attachments. Later on Rahim finds his house burned down and is out on the street after the destruction of his house. The rest of the story is about how Rajan and Bashir prove their innocence, who killed Bhuree and Dr. John, why were they killed and by whom, how Rahim tries his best to find out who is the real culprit who is trying to frame Devarajan and his family in false charges and how Diwan sticks to his principles of law and to what extent he goes to ensure that justice is delivered.

== Cast ==
- Prem Nazir as Devarajan
- Madhu as Moidu, father of Dr. Bashir
- Sukumaran as Rajan, son of Devarajan and Sharada
- Srividya as Sharada, wife of Devarajan
- M. G. Soman as Bhasheer, friend of Rajan
- K. P. Ummer as Khader
- Sumalatha as Santha
- Rajyalakshmi as Rasiya
- Jose Prakash as Sebastian
- Sankaradi as Velu
- Janardanan as Lazar
- C. I. Paul as John
- Kaduvakulam Antony as Anthappan
- Manavalan Joseph as Sankaran
- Cochin Haneefa as Gopinath
- Prathapachandran as Police officer

== Soundtrack ==
The music was composed by Shyam, A. T. Ummer, K. J. Joy and Shankar–Ganesh and the lyrics were written by Poovachal Khader.

No.	Song	Singers	Composer	Length (m:ss)
1	"Aarambham Madhu Paathrangalil"	Vani Jairam, Chorus	K. J. Joy	
2	"Ayyayyo Ennarikilitha"	S. Janaki	Shyam	
3	"Chelotha Puthumaaran"	K. J. Yesudas, S. Janaki, Chorus	A. T. Ummer	
4	"Ennum Mannil Kurukshethra Yudham"	K. J. Yesudas, Chorus	Shankar–Ganesh	

== Release and reception ==
The film was released on 1 September 1982 on the occasion of Onam. The film was praised by critics and audiences alike. The film was praised for its script, direction and the performance of the cast. The film was a super hit and went on to become the third highest grossing Malayalam film of 1982.
