= Lalu Alex =

Indian film actor (born 1954)

- Born: Lalu Alex; 30 November 1954 (age 71); Piravom, Kerala, India
- Occupations: Actor; philanthropist
- Years active: 1978–present
- Spouse: Betty Lalu Alex (m. 1986)
- Children: 3
- Parents: V. E. Chandy; Annamma Chandy
- Awards: Kerala State Film Awards (2004)
- Website: lalualex.com

Lalu Alex (born 30 November 1954) is an Indian film actor who works predominantly in Malayalam films. In a career spanning four decades, he has acted in over 250 films and is known for his comic, antagonistic and character roles.

Alex started his acting career as a supporting actor in the film Ee Ganam Marakkumo in 1978 and associated with notable films in his earlier career including Idi Muzhakkam, Nayattu (directed by Sreekumaran Thampi), Meen, Thushaaram and Thrishna. He has also acted in three Tamil movies.

== Early life and family ==
Lalu Alex was born as the first of three children of Chandy and Annamma at Piravom, Muvattupuzha Taluk. Lalu Alex has been married to Betty since 1986. They have four children named Ben Lalu Alex, Molamma Lalu Alex, Sen Lalu Alex and Ciya Lalu Alex. Ben acted in the Malayalam movie Orkut Oru Ormakoot.

== Career ==
Lalu Alex started his career in the movie Ee Gaanam Marakkumo in 1978. He was able to work in I. V. Sasi's significant films such as Thrishna, Thusharam, and Ahimsa. His appeared in Sasi's Ee Nadu, playing the role of S. P. Alexander. After that he acted in villainous character roles in films like Sasi's Kanamarayath, Alkootathil Thaniye, John Jaffer Janardhanan, Mrugaya, Balachandra Menon's Karyam Nissaram, and Prasnam Gurutharam. Director Joshiy gave Alex roles in films like Aa Ratri, Bhookambam, Alakadalin Akkare, Minimol Vathikanil, Muhurtham 11.30 and Nair Saab. He has worked with directors such as K. Madhu in Moonam Mura, Adikkurippu, Orukkam, Chathurangam.

In the 1990s, Lalu Alex turned to comic roles. He has worked with Sathyan Anthikkad in Kalikkalam and Kamal in Manjupole Oru Penkutty and Niram.

Alex's use of comedy, dialogue, delivery, and performance skill has rendered him as a notable figure in the industry.

== Partial filmography ==
Key
†	Denotes films that have not yet been released

=== Malayalam ===
Year	Title	Role	Notes
1978	Ee Ganam Marakkumo	Vikraman	Debut film
1978	Tharoo Oru Janmam Koodi		
1979	Veerabhadran		
1979	Mani Koya Kurup		
1980	Air Hostess	Gopinath	
1980	Ammayum Makalum	Vasu	
1980	Idi Muzhakkam	Moosa	
1980	Meen	Varkey's Son	
1980	Naayattu	Peter	
1981	Nidra	Vishwam	
1981	Thushaaram	Cap. Alex	
1981	Ellaam Ninakku Vendi	Unnikrishnan	
1981	Thrishna	Ramakrishnan	
1981	Ahimsa	Raghu	
1982	Aasha	Doctor	
1982	Kaaliya Mardhanam	Rahim	
1982	Ee Nadu	A.S.P. Alexander	
1982	Vidhichathum Kothichathum	Suresh	
1982	John Jaffer Janardhanan	Roberts Gunda	
1982	Enikkum Oru Divasam	Prathapan	
1982	Ithiri Neram Othiri Karyam	Vimala's Lover	
1982	Innalenkil Nale	Madhu	
1983	Coolie	Shaji	
1983	Prasnam Gurutharam	Mohan	
1983	Justice Raja	Shaji	
1983	Karyam Nissaram	Sarala's Husband	
1983	Thimingalam	Gopan	
1983	Iniyengilum	Alex	
1983	Bhookambam	Michael	
1983	Belt Mathai	Indrapalan	
1983	Aa Raathri	Babu	
1984	Thirakal	Varghese	
1984	Kodathi	Das	
1984	Nilaavinte Naattil	Johny	
1984	NH 47	S.I. Johnson	
1984	Minimol Vathicanil	Lalu	
1984	Jeevitham	Rameshan	
1984	Chakkarayumma	Pavunni	
1984	Unaroo	Bastin	
1984	Thathamme Poocha Poocha	Chanthu	
1984	Swanthamevide Bandhamevide	Balachandran	
1984	Manasse Ninakku Mangalam	Soman	
1984	Koottinilamkili	Vikrama Kurup	
1984	Kanamarayathu	Alex	
1984	Inakkily	Raju	
1984	Athirathram	Charley	
1984	Alakadalinakkare	Padmanabhan	
1984	Aalkkoottathil Thaniye	Padmanabhan	
1985	Muhurtham Pathnonnu Muppathinu	Tony	
1985	Vannu Kandu Keezhadakki	Rajan	
1985	Avidathe Pole Ivideyum	Neelima's Friend	
1985	Iniyum Kadha Thudarum	Felix Alexander	
1985	Oru Kudakeezhil	SI Felix Joseph	
1985	Puzhayozhukum Vazhi	Aravindan	
1985	Akkacheyude Kunjuvava	Jayarajan	
1985	Onningu Vannengil	Lal	
1985	Upaharam	Tony Cheriyan	
1985	Ambada Njaane!	Peethambaran	
1985	Oru Nokku Kanan	Gopan	
1985	Ee Lokam Evide Kure Manushyar	Sreedharan	
1985	Aa Neram Alppa Dooram	Dinesh Varma	
1985	Karimpinpoovinakkare	Vasu	
1985	Kandu Kandarinju	Grasscourt Kumar	
1986	Ente Entethu Mathrem	Gauthaman	
1986	Nilaavinte Naattil	Lover of Mary	
1986	Love Story	Satheeshan	
1986	Poovinu Puthiya Poonthennal	Inspector Simon	
1986	Nimishangal		
1986	Malarum Kiliyum	Renji	
1986	Prathyekam Sradhikkukka	SI Jayadevan	
1986	Oppam Oppathinoppam	Mathachan	
1986	Ente Entethu Mathrem	Gowthaman	
1986	Shyama	Chandran	
1986	Snehamulla Simham	Venu	
1986	Adukkan Entheluppam	Nandakumar	
1986	Nyayavidhi	Kavil Johnie	
1986	Veendum	Sukumaran	
1987	January Oru Orma	Minnal Dineshan	
1987	Oru Sindoora Pottinte Ormaykku	George Thomas	
1987	Ivide Ellavarkum Sukham	Sethuraman	
1987	Kalam Mari Katha Mari	Razzak	
1987	Kathakku Pinnil	Priyadarshan	
1987	Nirabedhangal	Psychiatrist	
1987	Ithrayum Kaalam	Alex	
1987	Nombarathi Poovu	Sethu	
1987	Aankiliyude Tharattu	Rajesh	
1988	Daisy	Ravi	
1988	Oozham		
1988	Simon Peter Ninakku Vendi	Arjun	
1988	Unnikrishnante Adyathe Christmas	Dasan	
1988	Mrithunjayam	Nagendran Gounder	
1988	Charavalayam	Jagadish	
1988	Moonnam Mura	Charles	
1988	Vicharana	Johny	
1989	Miss Pameela	Psychiatrist	
1989	Aattinakkare	Sajan	
1989	Ammavanu Pattiya Amali	Sreenivasan	
1989	Vadakkunokkiyantram	Capt. Balan	
1989	Puthiya Karukkal	Dr. Thomas Kurien	
1989	Adikkurippu	Captain John Samuel	
1989	Nair Saab	James/A. K. K. Nambiar	
1989	Mrugaya	Anthony	
1990	Varthamana Kalam	George Thomas	
1990	Brahmarakshassu	Vasudevan Thampi	
1990	Sunday 7 PM	Dr Sunny	
1990	Orukkam	Narayanankutty	
1990	Nammude Naade	Nandakumar	
1990	Arhatha	Sethu	
1990	Appu	Adv. Prabhakaran	
1990	Kalikkalam	Mathews	
1990	Oliyampukal	Jameskutty	
1990	Lal Salam	Medayil Avaran Kutty	
1990	Ee Thanutha Veluppan Kalathu	Joy	
1991	Kankettu	Jaffer	
1991	Adayalam	C.I. Raju Peter	
1991	Maydinam	S.I. Haridas	
1992	Annu Good Friday		
1993	Padheyam	Harikumara Menon	
1994	Dollar	Jose	
1994	Minnaram	Dr. Romy	
1994	Manathe Vellitheru	Thomas Jacob	
1994	Kashmeeram	Rajan	
1994	The City	Commissioner	
1994	Vishnu	Jailor	
1995	Saadaram	Harichandra Menon	
1995	Sundarimaare Sookshikkuka		
1995	Chantha	C.I. Sekher Joseph	
1995	Nirnayam	Commissioner Javed Khan	
1996	Swarnna Kireedam		
1996	Kanjirapally Kariyachan	Baby Kanjirapally	
1996	Manthrika Kuthira	Venugopal	
1997	Oru Mutham Manimutham	Fenadez	
1997	Siamese Irattakal		
1997	Oral Mathram	Mathews	
1997	Irattakuttikalude Achan	Doctor	
1998	British Market	Advocate Kurup	
1998	Sidhartha	Commissioner	
1998	Ormacheppu	George	
1999	Niram	Dr.Sunny	
1999	Mazhavillu	Varkeychan	
1999	Aayiram Meni	Varkey	
2000	Punaradhivasam	Biju	
2000	Mark Antony	Fr. Parel Urumees	
2000	Swayamvara Panthal	Doctor	
2000	Kannaadikkadavathu		
2000	Kochu Kochu Santhoshangal	Ashok	
2001	Mazhameghapraavukal		
2001	Saivar Thirumeni	Pappan	
2002	Phantom	'Dhimdhi' Mathai	
2002	Onnaman	R.D.O Hari	
2002	Chathurangam	Methikkalam Thommichan	
2002	Kalyanaraman	Thampi	
2003	Mullavalliyum Thenmavum	Dr. Alex	
2003	Chronic Bachelor	Balagangadharan/Shekharankutty	
2003	Pulival Kalyanam	Raghavendra Sett	
2004	Ennittum	Gopal	
2004	Sasneham Sumithra	Sekhar	
2004	Njaan Salperu Raman Kutty	Velayudhan	
2004	Manjupoloru Penkutti	Immanuel	
2004	Sathyam	Police Officer	
2005	Boyy Friennd	Father Kacharathara	
2005	Kalyana Kurimanam		
2005	December	Stephen	
2005	Vacation	Martin	
2005	Bharathchandran I.P.S.	Habeeb Basheer I.P.S.	
2006	The Don	Father of Anumol	
2006	Vrindaavanam		
2006	Pathaaka	Chief Minister	
2007	Rathri Mazha	Balashankar	
2007	Inspector Garud	Rajan Joseph	
2007	November Rain	CI Krishna Moorthy	
2007	Mission 90 Days	DIG Rajiv	
2007	Nasrani	K. Rajagopal	
2007	Chocolate	Mathews	
2007	Kangaroo	Stephan	
2008	Pachamarathanalil	Alfie	
2008	Raudram	S.P. Thomas Antony	
2008	Maya Bazar	Dr Koshi	
2008	Twenty:20	D.I.G. Krishnadas	
2008	Sultan	John Varghese	
2009	Utharaswayamvaram	Ponnuveetil Mahadevan	
2009	Duplicate	Pattalam Keshavan	
2009	Vellathooval	Jimmy	
2009	Love In Singapore	Rathnam	
2009	Hailesa	Ganapathi Iyer	
2009	Pazhassi Raja	Emman Nair	
2009	Oru Black and White Kudumbam	Varma	
2009	Angel John	Joseph	
2009	Ividam Swargamanu	Aluva Chandy	
2010	Kanmazha Peyyum Munpe		
2010	Oru Naal Varum	Vinod Abraham	
2010	Four Friends	Surya's father	
2010	Puthumukhangal	Prof.Paul Henry	
2010	Elgeshwara Mountains	Somashekaran I.P.S	
2010	The Thriller	IG Thomas Mathew IPS	
2010	Nayakan	Rajagopal	
2010	Mummy & Me	Thomas	
2010	Shikkar	Sathyan	
2011	August 15	Petter Skariya	
2011	Ithu Nammude Katha	George Kutty	
2011	Payyans	Kuttappan sir	
2011	Janapriyan	Priyadarshan's Boss	
2011	Ven Shankhu Pol		
2011	Seniors	Idikkula's father-in-law	
2011	Killadi Raman	Prabhakaran Thampi	
2011	Sandwich	Sai's Father	
2011	Ulakam Chuttum Valiban	IG Hameed IPS	
2011	Indian Rupee	Surendran	
2012	Cobra: Kottayam Brothers	John Samuel	
2012	Cinema Company	Roshni's father	
2012	Casanovva	Zachariah	
2012	Navagatharkku Swagatham	Principal	
2012	Kalikaalam	Satheesh Nair	
2012	Molly Aunty Rocks!	Benny	
2012	Scene Onnu Nammude Veedu	K. K. Jose	
2012	Ordinary	Venu Mash	
2013	Maad Dad	Soda Mathan	
2013	Romans	Thommichan	
2013	Progress Report	Chandran	
2013	ABCD	Issac John	
2013	Neram	Johnykutty	
2013	Pattam Pole	Mathews	
2014	My Dear Mummy		
2014	Muppathu Vellikkaasu		
2014	Salaam Kashmier	Roy	
2014	How Old Are You	I. G.	
2014	Happy Journey	Jacob	
2014	Vellivelichathil	Venu	
2014	Villali Veeran	Narendra Menon	
2014	Onnum Mindathe	Sadasivan	
2015	Avarude Veedu		
2015	Ithinumappuram	Dhanapalan	
2015	Ammakkoru Tharattu		
2015	Monsoon		
2015	Chirakodinja Kinavukal	Thayyalkaran's father	
2015	Jo and the Boy	John Lawrence	
2016	Yaadhaarthyam		
2016	Don't Worry Be Happy		
2016	Puzhayum Kannaadiyum		
2016	Aakashvani	Prabhakaran	
2016	Olive Marangal Pookkumbol		
2016	Marubhoomiyile Aana	Kamalaasanan	
2018	Parole	SP Jacob Sam	
2018	Oru Kuttanadan Blog	G.P.Nair	
2018	Aickarakkonathe Bhishaguaranmaa	Manjooran	
2018	Nonsense	Surgeon Doctor	
2019	Soothrakkaran	Madathil Sreedharan	
2019	Pathinettam Padi	Nandan Menon	
2019	Driving License	Jagannatha Varma	
2020	Varane Avashyamund	Manuel	
2021	Pidikittapulli	Madhavan	
2022	Bro Daddy	Kurian Maliekkal	
2022	Mahaveeryar	Public Prosecutor	
2022	Gold	"Idea" Shaji	
2023	Imbam	Karunakaran	
2024	Nadanna Sambhavam	CI Pradeep	
2024	Idiyan Chandhu	Fr Joseph Mambully	
2025	Apoorva puthranmar	Sebanos	
2025	Hridayapoorvam	Jacob	
2026	Revolver Rinko	Damodaran	
2026	Athimanoharam †	TBA	
2027	Ottakomban †	TBA	

=== Tamil ===
Year	Title	Role
1982	Valibamey Vaa Vaa	boxer
1988	Jeeva	C.J. Dass
1993	Airport	
2008	Bheema	Government officer
2008	Sandai	Paalpandi

== Awards ==
=== Kerala State Film Awards ===
- 2004 - Kerala State Film Award for Second Best Actor - Manjupoloru Penkutti

=== Kerala Film Critics Association Awards ===
- 2003 - Second Best Actor - Manjupoloru Penkutti

=== Asianet Film Awards ===
- 2009 - Best Actor in a Villain Role – Evidam Swargamanu

=== Amrita Mathrubhumi Film Awards ===
- 2009 - Best Villain — Evidam Swargamanu
