= Alakadalinakkare =

- Directed by: Joshiy
- Screenplay by: Kaloor Dennis
- Produced by: Thiruppathi Chettiyar
- Starring: Prem Nazir; Madhu; Shobana; Mammootty
- Cinematography: N.A Thara
- Edited by: K. Sankunni
- Music by: Gangai Amaran
- Production company: Evershine Productions
- Distributed by: Evershine Productions
- Release date: 7 September 1984
- Country: India
- Language: Malayalam

Alakadalinakkare is a 1984 Indian Malayalam film, directed by Joshiy and produced by Thiruppathi Chettiyar. It is a remake of the 1982 Hindi movie Vidhaata. The film stars Prem Nazir, Madhu, Shobana and Mammootty in the lead roles. The film has musical score by Gangai Amaran.

== Plot ==
Veerendra, a smuggler, kills Mohan, a customs officer, only to realise that Mohan's father Balu was a witness. When Verendran sets out to kill Balu, his grandson Anand comes to his rescue.

== Cast ==
- Madhu as Balu, Das, M. D. (smuggler, Vijaya group)
- Prem Nazir as Yusaph (Friend of Balu)
- M. G. Soman as Mohan (Customs Officer) Balu's Son
- Mammootty as Anand (Mohan's Son)
- K. P. Ummer as Rajasekhar (Balu's Boss)
- Shobana as Daisy (Lover of Anand)
- Sumalatha as Mohan's wife
- Jose Prakash as Veerendra Nath (smuggler)
- Govindankutty as Veerendran's Gunda
- Jayaprabha as Amina (Yusaph's wife)
- Prathapachandran as Daisy's father
- Sukumari as Daisy's mother
- KPAC Sunny as Varma (smuggler, Vijaya group)
- Lalu Alex as Padmanabhan (Varma's son)
- C. I. Paul as John Varghese ((smuggler, Vijaya group)
- Janardanan as Khadar ((smuggler, Vijaya group)
- Jagathy Sreekumar
- Kaduvakulam Antony
- Kunchan
- Silk Smitha as dancer

== Soundtrack ==
The music was composed by Gangai Amaran and the lyrics were written by Mankombu Gopalakrishnan and Poovachal Khader.

No.	Song	Singers	Lyrics	Length (m:ss)
1	"Aaro Nee"	Vani Jairam	Mankombu Gopalakrishnan	04:13
2	"Doore Saagaram"	K. J. Yesudas, P. Jayachandran	Mankombu Gopalakrishnan	
3	"Ente Meyyil"	Vani Jairam, Chorus	Mankombu Gopalakrishnan	03:41
4	"Ezhimalakkaatte"	P. Madhuri	Poovachal Khader	04:18
5	"Ponnaare Manipponnaare"	K. J. Yesudas, Vani Jairam	Mankombu Gopalakrishnan	
6	"Vaanil Mukilala"	K. J. Yesudas, P. Jayachandran, Vani Jairam, Chorus	Poovachal Khader	04:16
