= Saatchi (film) =

- Theatrical release poster
- Directed by: S. A. Chandrasekhar
- Screenplay by: S. A. Chandrasekhar
- Story by: Kaloor Dennis
- Produced by: P. S. V. Hariharan
- Starring: Vijayakanth; Viji; M. N. Nambiar
- Cinematography: P. Vijay
- Edited by: P. R. Gautham Raju
- Music by: Shankar–Ganesh
- Production company: Veeralakshmi Combines
- Release date: 16 September 1983
- Running time: 138 minutes
- Country: India
- Language: Tamil

Saatchi (transl. Witness) is a 1983 Indian Tamil-language action film, written and directed by S. A. Chandrasekhar and produced by P. S. V. Hariharan. The film stars Vijayakanth, Viji and M. N. Nambiar. It is a remake of the 1981 Malayalam film Raktham. The film was released on 16 September 1983.

== Plot ==
After a policeman marries his love interest, he is tasked with apprehending a dangerous criminal.

== Cast ==
- Vijayakanth as Inspector Vijay
- Viji
- Mucherla Aruna
- M. N. Nambiar
- Pandari Bai
- Senthil
- V. Gopalakrishnan
- Sangili Murugan
- Vennira Aadai Moorthy
- Nizhalgal Ravi
- Anuradha

== Production ==
Chandrasekhar initially planned to remake his Kannada film Geluvu Nannade as Vetri Namadhe with Vijayakanth and Mohan in lead roles; however the project was shelved after Mohan left the film hence Chandrasekhar started another project which eventually became Saatchi. The lead role was offered to Prabhu, and later Karthik, both of whom declined; Vijayakanth was ultimately cast. The film was launched on 9 May 1983 at AVM Studios. Filming took place in Salem.

== Soundtrack ==
The music was composed by Shankar–Ganesh.

Title	Singer(s)	Length
"Aagayam Poo"	S. N. Surendar, P. Susheela	04:20
"Maarividu"	Malaysia Vasudevan	03:10
"Malar Manjangal"	S. N. Surendar, Vani Jairam	03:35
"Thenna Marathula"	S. N. Surendar, P. Susheela	03:45

== Critical reception ==
Jayamanmadhan of Kalki praised the performances of Vijayakanth and Nambiar but panned Viji's acting and concluded calling it a fast-paced film. Balumani of Anna praised the acting, stunt choreography and stated it would have been better if the focus on the first half of the screenplay had been a little more than the focus on the second half. Although the first half is a bit boring, the second half makes up for it.
