= Nyayavidhi =

- Poster designed by Gayathri Ashokan
- Directed by: Joshiy
- Written by: Chalil Jacob; Dennis Joseph (dialogues)
- Screenplay by: Dennis Joseph
- Produced by: Joy Thomas
- Starring: Mammootty; Shobhana; Sukumaran; Lalu Alex; Sulakshana
- Cinematography: Jayanan Vincent
- Edited by: K. Sankunni
- Music by: M. K. Arjunan
- Production company: Jubilee Productions
- Distributed by: Jubilee Productions
- Release date: 14 September 1986
- Country: India
- Language: Malayalam

Nyayavidhi is a 1986 Indian Malayalam-language film, directed by Joshiy and produced by Joy Thomas. It stars Mammootty, Shobhana, Sukumaran, and Lalu Alex. The film has a musical score by M. K. Arjunan.

== Plot ==
Paramu and Johnny frame Unnithan for the murder of a Govt. official committed by the latter. They manage to do this with a corrupt policeman's help. They steal businessman Unnithan's black money, trap Malayil Thomas, another businessman, and become successful. Paramu squanders the money and chooses to work as a henchman for an Anglo-Indian businessman named McPherson, and Johnny builds himself up as a businessman with the money. To avoid being captured in a raid, McPherson asks Paramu to safe-keep 100 lakhs (1 crore) of his unaccounted money for two months. Paramu entrusts the money to Johnny, but they fall out because of Unnithan's daughter, Geetha, who now is a low life due to circumstances. Paramu marries Geetha out of guilt and Johnny becomes his enemy. Johnny grows paranoid and starts to eliminate everyone whom he distrusts. Johnny, with the help of Mathews, informs McPherson that Paramu has run off with the money. They two join hands to eliminate Paramu and retrieve the money. In the end, Johnny shoots Paramu and vice versa. They both die near the fields where they committed their first murder together.

== Cast ==
- Mammootty as Paramu
- Shobhana as Geetha
- Lalu Alex as Kavil Johnny
- Sulakshana as Bhaymi
- Sukumaran as McPherson
- K. P. A. C. Azeez as Unnithan
- K. P. A. C. Sunny as Police Officer Hari
- Innocent as Channar
- Paravoor Bharathan as Kochettan
- Mala Aravindan as Mathunni (Kalyanam Mudakki)
- Adoor Bhavani as Kochanna
- Kundara Johnny as Vareeth
- Kunchan as Sadharaman
- V. D. Rajappan as David
- Babu Namboothiri as Maharshi Mathews
- Ragini as Dolly
- Mohan Jose
- P. K. Abraham
- Kuyili as Thanka
- Radhadevi
- Mannar Radhakrishnan

== Soundtrack ==
The music was composed by M. K. Arjunan with lyrics by Shibu Chakravarthy.

No.	Song	Singers	Lyrics	Length (m:ss)
1	"Chellacheru Veedu Tharam"	K. S. Chithra	Shibu Chakravarthy	
2	"Chelulla Malankurava"	K. S. Chithra, Chorus	Shibu Chakravarthy	
3	"Etho Yakshikkadha"	Unni Menon	Shibu Chakravarthy	
