= Onningu Vannengil =

- Directed by: Joshiy
- Written by: A. R. Mukesh; Kaloor Dennis (dialogues)
- Screenplay by: Kaloor Dennis
- Produced by: Sajan
- Starring: Mammootty; Shankar; Jagathy Sreekumar; Thilakan; James
- Cinematography: Anandakuttan
- Edited by: K. Sankunni
- Music by: Shyam
- Production company: Saj Productions
- Distributed by: Saj Productions
- Release date: 20 June 1985
- Country: India
- Language: Malayalam

Onningu Vannengil is a 1985 Indian Malayalam-language film, directed by Joshiy and produced by Sajan. The film stars Mammootty, Nadia Moidu, Jagathy Sreekumar, Thilakan and Shankar. Shyam composed the music.

== Cast ==
- Mammootty as Mohandas
  - Baiju as Young Mohandas
- Shankar as Baby/Thankachan
- Nadia Moidu as Meera
- Jagathy Sreekumar as Esthappan
- Thilakan as Pankajakshan Menon
- Lissy Priyadarshan as Priya Menon
- James
- Lalithasree
- Lalu Alex as Lal
- Paravoor Bharathan

== Release ==
The film was released on 20 June 1985.

=== Box office ===
The film was a commercial and critical success.

== Soundtrack ==
The music was composed by Shyam with lyrics by Poovachal Khader.

No.	Song	Singers	Lyrics	Length (m:ss)
1	"Anuje Ninakkaay"	K. J. Yesudas	Poovachal Khader	
2	"Dum Dum Dum Swaramelam"	K. S. Chithra, Sharreth	Poovachal Khader	
3	"Kaalangal Maarunnu"	K. S. Chithra	Poovachal Khader	
4	"Kaalangal Maarunnu"	K. J. Yesudas	Poovachal Khader	
5	"Maarikko Maarikko"	K. S. Chithra, Vani Jairam	Poovachal Khader	
6	"Mangalam Manjulam"	K. J. Yesudas, K. S. Chithra	Poovachal Khader	
