= Sesham (disambiguation) =

Sesham is a 2002 Indian Malayalam-language drama film written and directed by T. K. Rajeev Kumar.

Sesham may also refer to:

- Sesham Mike-il Fathima, 2023 Indian Malayalam-language comedy-drama film
- Idavelakku Sesham, 1984 Indian Malayalam film
