= Raktham =

- Poster
- Directed by: Joshiy
- Written by: Kaloor Dennis
- Screenplay by: Kaloor Dennis
- Produced by: Jagan Appachan
- Starring: Madhu; Prem Nazir; Srividya; MG Soman
- Cinematography: N. A. Thara
- Edited by: K. Sankunni
- Music by: Johnson
- Production company: Jagan Pictures
- Distributed by: Jagan Pictures
- Release date: 4 September 1981
- Country: India
- Language: Malayalam

Raktham (transl. Blood) is a 1981 Indian Malayalam film, written by Kaloor Dennis, directed by Joshiy and produced by Jagan Appachan under Jagan Pictures. The film stars Prem Nazir, Madhu, Srividya and MG Soman in the lead roles. The film has musical score by Johnson and cinematography was handled by N. A. Thara. The film revolves around CI Haridas and his family, consisting of his wife Malathy and daughter and Viswanathan, a military man and his revenge against the people who killed his wife and threatened his family. The film marked the debut of Captain Raju as an actor.

Raktham premiered at the Mymoon theatre, Ernakulam on September 4, 1981 as its inaugural film. It ran for more than 100 days and was declared a hit. It was remade in Tamil as Saatchi, in Telugu as Balidaanam and in Hindi as Balidaan.

== Plot ==
CI Haridas lives a wealthy lifestyle in Bombay along with his aunt while his father, retired Major Nair lives in the countryside in a farmhouse. Haridas meets and falls in love with Malathy, who lives opposite his house along with her father, Pillechan ashan and her mother Janki. When Pillechan ashan finds out that Malathy and Haridas are in love, he forbids her to see him, but subsequently relents when she takes poison. Both Haridas and Malathy get married and shortly thereafter give birth to a girl. After some time Haridas is specially tasked by the government to catch a dangerous criminal, Padmanabhan, who is the leader of a bandit's gang, which had looted a wedding party bus on the Bombay-Poona Highway, sexually molested females, and killed several passengers, Haridas is successful in arresting one of the gangsters, a hotel manager named Gunda, who colluded with the bandits, but Advocate Ghaswala defends him and gets him acquitted, resulting in the killing of the only eye-witness, a 10-year-old boy. In retaliation, Haridas beats up and kills Gunda, which results in his suspension. Then Haridas starts getting threats and has a bomb planted in his house. The panic-stricken family flees to Major Nair's farmhouse, but bandits locate them there and forcibly abduct Malathy and their daughter after assaulting Major Nair. Haridas must now rush to save his wife and daughter, but he could save only his daughter; Malathy dies by falling under the train. Now Vijay decides to take revenge against Padmanabhan and his gang, he eliminates them one by one and finally, surrenders him to the judiciary.

== Cast ==
- Madhu as Vishwanathan
- Prem Nazir as CI Haridas
- Srividya as Malathy
- M. G. Soman as Dr Venu
- Jose Prakash as Major Nair
- Sankaradi as Pillechan ashan
- Captain Raju as Gunda
- Balan K. Nair as Padmanabhan
- Mala Aravindan as Kuttappan
- Sumalatha as Valsala
- Roja Ramani as Sreekutti
- Cochin Haneefa as Neelakandan
- Azeez as SP
- Ravi Menon as Joseph
- Jagannatha Varma as George
- Sonia as Haridas's daughter
- Sathyachithra as Padmanabhan's lover
- EO Joseph as Ramankutty

== Soundtrack ==
The music was composed by Johnson and the lyrics were written by R. K. Damodaran.

No.	Song	Singers	Lyrics	Length (m:ss)
1	"Ayyapantamma Neyyapam Chuttu"	K. J. Yesudas, Vani Jairam	R. K. Damodaran	
2	"Manjil Chekkerum"	K. J. Yesudas, Vani Jairam	R. K. Damodaran	
3	"Sukham Oru Greeshmamirangiya"	K. J. Yesudas	R. K. Damodaran	
