= Iniyum Kadha Thudarum =

- Promotional poster designed by Kitho
- Directed by: Joshiy
- Written by: Kaloor Dennis; John Paul (dialogues)
- Screenplay by: John Paul
- Produced by: Poorna Chandra Rao
- Starring: Mammootty; Thilakan; Jaya Prada; Ambika; Baby Shalini
- Cinematography: Anandakuttan
- Edited by: K. Sankunni
- Music by: Shyam
- Production company: Lekshmi Productions
- Distributed by: central pictures
- Release date: 22 August 1985
- Country: India
- Language: Malayalam

Iniyum Kadha Thudarum (transl. The story will continue ) is a 1985 Indian Malayalam-language film, directed by Joshiy and produced by Poorna Chandra Rao. It is inspired from the Amitabh Bachchan movie Andhaa Kaanoon. The film stars Mammootty, Thilakan, Jaya Prada, Ambika and Baby Shalini. The film has musical score by Shyam.

== Plot ==
Raveendran is an honest customs officer, who has lost his mother at a very young age and is abandoned by his father. Chacko, his teacher, had brought him up providing all education. Raveendran falls in love with Nirmala 'Nimmi' a college student. Despite her father opposing their relationship, she elopes and marries Raveendran and leads a good married life. Even after they are blessed with a daughter, Nimmi's father shows no attachment towards them.

Businessman Alexander has a good image in public, but along with his three sons Freddie, Felix and Stephen are engaged in importing goods illegally and evading customs. Raveendran arrests a group engaged in illegal activities, and later discovers that one of them is the son-in-law of Chacko. The culprit, being a Muslim had eloped with Chacko's daughter Mary. Though Mary is not willing to accept financial aid, Raveendran provides for her living expenses through the local shopkeeper Moidu who is helping Mary.

Raveendran raids Alexander's warehouse and finds maps related to India, which leads him to conclude that Alexander is involved in treason. Alexander offers money to Raveendran, which he refuses. Alexander hires goons to eliminate Raveendran but he overpowers them. Raveendran is falsely accused for murdering Alexander and gets imprisoned for nine years.

Nimmi and her daughter are asked to leave their official residence and end up staying with Mary. As life becomes difficult, Mary goes to her hometown to get her family share. Alexander's three sons break into Mary's house then brutally rape Nimmi and murder her daughter. Nimmi kills herself. Raveendran is brought out of jail to perform the last rituals.

Nine years later, Raveendran is released from jail. He initially believed Nimmi and his daughter committed suicide because of financial hardship. He learns the truth from Moidu who tells him that some people saw Alexander's sons breaking into Mary's house and hands the suicide note of Nimmi which Moidu had kept safe where she reveals what happened that day. Raveendran now wants to take revenge for the death of his wife and daughter.

He kills Stephen and Felix. When he is about to kill Freddie he sees Alexander alive there. At gunpoint, Alexander confesses that nine years ago they actually killed their employee Bharathan for exposing them and faked it as Alexander's death in order to frame Raveendran. Raveendran kills Freddie then follows Alexander into a courtroom~~,~~ and kills Alexander in front of the judge. The judge orders police to arrest him. Raveendran proclaims that he was already punished for killing the same person and how can he be punished again?

== Cast ==
- Mammootty as Raveendran
- Thilakan as Alexander
- Jaya Prada as Nirmala Menon/Nimmi
- Nedumudi Venu as Moidu
- M. G. Soman as Raghava Menon, Nimmi's father
- T. P. Madhavan as Nanukuttan Nair, a Senior Customs officer
- Ambika as Mary
- Santhosh as Stephen Alexander
- Baby Shalini as Raveendran's and Nimmi's daughter
- Innocent as Pappanchettan the chauffeur
- Kunchan as Govindan Kutty
- Captain Raju as Freddie Alexander
- Lalu Alex as Felix Alexander
- Paravoor Bharathan as Bharathan
- Prathapachandran as Judge

== Soundtrack ==
The music was composed by Shyam and the lyrics were written by Poovachal Khader.

No.	Song	Singers	Lyrics	Length (m:ss)
1	"Devi Neeyen"	Vani Jairam, Unni Menon	Poovachal Khader	
2	"Oru Chirithan"	S. Janaki	Poovachal Khader	
