= Kaahalam =

- Theatrical release poster
- Directed by: Joshiy
- Produced by: Areefa Hassan
- Starring: Prem Nazir; Nanditha Bose; Seema; Raveendran
- Edited by: K. Sankunni
- Music by: A. T. Ummer
- Production company: Arifa Enterprises
- Distributed by: Arifa Enterprises
- Release date: 31 July 1981
- Country: India
- Language: Malayalam

Kaahalam is a 1981 Indian Malayalam film, directed by Joshiy and produced by Areefa Hassan. The film stars Prem Nazir, Nanditha Bose, Seema, and Raveendran in the lead roles. The film has musical score by A. T. Ummer.

== Cast ==
- Prem Nazir
- Nanditha Bose
- Seema
- Raveendran
- Cochin Haneefa
- Kuthiravattam Pappu
- Balan K. Nair
- Sathaar
- Jayamalini
- Jaffer Khan
- Bheeman Raghu

== Soundtrack ==
The music was composed by A. T. Ummer and the lyrics were written by B. Manikyam, Ramachandran and K. G. Menon.

No.	Song	Singers	Lyrics	Length (m:ss)
1	"Ente Karavalayam"	P. Susheela	B. Manikyam	
2	"Kanni Vettakkorungi Nilkkum"	K. J. Yesudas	Ramachandran	
3	"Raajasadassinilakkam"	L. R. Anjali, S. P. Sailaja	B. Manikyam	
4	"Vaanam Poovanam"	K. J. Yesudas, L. R. Anjali	K. G. Menon	
