= Ee Thanutha Veluppan Kalathu =

1990 Malayalam film

- Poster
- Directed by: Joshiy
- Written by: P. Padmarajan
- Produced by: Balan
- Starring: Mammootty; Suresh Gopi; Nedumudi Venu; Sumalatha; Lakshmi
- Cinematography: Jayanan Vincent
- Edited by: K. Sankunni
- Music by: Shyam
- Distributed by: Gandhimathi Films
- Release date: 1990
- Country: India
- Language: Malayalam

Ee Thanutha Veluppan Kalathu (transl. In This Cold Morning) is a 1990 Malayalam-language mystery thriller film written by Padmarajan and directed by Joshiy. It stars Mammootty, Suresh Gopi, Nedumudi Venu, Lalu Alex, Sumalatha, Lakshmi and Murali. It was considered as one of the best mystery thriller films in Malayalam cinema.

== Plot ==
Justice T. Vasudev is murdered in his house, and after his death Coir is pushed into his mouth by the murderer. One of his close friends, businessman Kuwait Mani, seemed to be quite upset with this murder. Days later, Kuwait Mani is killed in an intentional car accident. After his death, coir was also inserted in the mouth. SP Haridas Damodaran IPS is assigned the investigation. Haridas orders his sub-ordinate Joy to collect details of similar murder cases from history. It is found that Rosario Fernandes, who was found to have poisoned himself to death also had coir in his mouth. The cops had not thought about this significant, as it was something that a victim might do in his last moments after consuming poison. The investigation later reveals that all of the victims were college classmates, and the next target is expected to be a businessman named Philip Thennalackal George. The investigation leads them to suspect named Christy, who was the son of Rosario Fernandes and Sreedevi Rosario.

Sreedevi had died bedridden owing to a disease. Haridas captures further information about Christy by meeting Sreedevi's father C. K. Gopala Menon, that he was behaving abnormally of late and his whereabouts are unknown. From a nurse named Leeladevi, it was also traced that Christy was present in mysterious circumstances when Sreedevi died in the hospital. On roughly questioning Philip, he reveals that they (Vasudev, Mani, Philip and Rosario) all had a longing for Sreedevi in their college days, but she didn't bother about them. When an opportunity came, they had raped her. During an event Haridas meets the chief guest Warrier, who is a spiritual leader having devotees all around the world. Later, Warrier locked someone in his house and called Haridas for help. Warrier claimed that the stranger tried to kill him and an encounter between Hari and the stranger took place in which the stranger narrowly escapes. The cops are able to trace and arrest Christy on murder charges, and returns to the mental asylum he had escaped from.

While undergoing treatment, Haridas transfers Christy to the police hospital citing better treatment and caring. Christy is subjected to Narcosynthesis, due to which Haridas learns that Christy has been misled by someone, who is most likely responsible for the crimes. Later, Christy escapes from the hospital which threats Haridas's job. Philip calls the cops for protection, but Haridas doesn't give him. Haridas and Joey watch Philip's home to catch the unknown culprit. It turns out that the perpetrator was Warrier, because during college time Sreedevi was initially his wife and the trio assaulted her in front of him. Aftermath, Warrier was under treatment for mental problems and set off for pilgrimage. When Warrier arrived back to the city and settled, he witnesses everyone who hurt him was happy and nothing wrong has happened to them. So he set out himself to avenge the injustice. Christy is proven innocent and brought back to a normal life, while Warrier is arrested for the serial killings.

== Cast ==
- Mammootty as SP Haridas Damodaran I.P.S
- Sumalatha as Lakshmi Haridas
- Nedumudi Venu as Warrier
- Lalu Alex as CI Joy Varghese
- Murali as Philip Thennalackal George, businessman
- Devan as Rosario Fernandez, businessman
- M. G. Soman as Kuwait Mani
- Babu Namboothiri as Justice T. Vasudev
- Suresh Gopi as Christopher / Christy
- Chithra as Padmam
- Lakshmi as Sreedevi Rosario
- Siddique as Santhosh, Haridas's Friend
- Captain Raju as Dr.Sabarinath, a psychiatrist
- Jagathy Sreekumar as Father. Paviyanos Vanolikkara
- Jagannatha Varma as I.G Gopinathan I.P.S, police chief
- Thesni Khan as Vasudev's daughter
- Sukumari as Stella Aunty (House keeper at Rosario's Home )
- Kaviyoor Ponnamma as Nurse Leeladevi
- Prathapachandran as C. K. Gopala Menon
- K. P. A. C. Sunny as D.I.G Ayyappan Marar I.P.S
- K. P. A. C. Azeez as Circle Inspector Mukundan Kurup
- Kollam Thulasi as Babu
- Thodupuzha Vasanthi as Justice Vasudev's Wife
- Valsala Menon as Mrs. Devis
- Rajan Sankaradi as Cameo Appearance
- Appa Haja as Cameo Appearance
- Mukesh (Cameo Appearance)
- Soorya as Ponnan's Wife Cameo Appearance
- Ravi Vallathol as Cameo Appearance
- Thikkurissy Sukumaran Nair
- Paravoor Bharathan
- Philomina

== Reception ==
The Indian Express wrote, "The film is a bit too long, but that need not put one off".
