= Minimol Vathicanil =

- Directed by: Joshiy
- Written by: Sasi M. Sajan; Kaloor Dennis (dialogues)
- Screenplay by: Kaloor Dennis
- Starring: Ratheesh; Saritha; Baby Shalini; Captain Raju
- Cinematography: Anandakkuttan
- Edited by: K. Sankunni
- Music by: M. S. Viswanathan
- Production company: Noble Films
- Distributed by: Noble Films
- Release date: 15 November 1984
- Country: India
- Language: Malayalam

Minimol Vathicanil is a 1984 Indian Malayalam film, directed by Joshiy. The film stars Ratheesh, Saritha, Baby Shalini and Captain Raju in the lead roles. The film has musical score by M. S. Viswanathan.

== Cast ==
- Ratheesh as Dr. Mohanachandran
- Baby Shalini as Minimol
- Raveendran as Raveendran
- Captain Raju as Venugopal (Cop)
- Lalu Alex as Lalu
- M. G. Soman as Dr. Thomas Mathew
- Saritha as Susy
- Swapna as Daisy
- Pope John Paul II as himself

== Production ==
Parts of the film were shot in Vatican City. Scenes involving Pope John Paul II lifting and kissing Shalini were included in the film.

== Soundtrack ==
The music was composed by M. S. Viswanathan and the lyrics were written by Poovachal Khader.

No.	Song	Singers	Lyrics	Length (m:ss)
1	"Aayiram Janmangal Venam"	K. J. Yesudas	Poovachal Khader	
2	"Kunjikkannukal Thuranna"	S. Janaki, Chorus	Poovachal Khader	
3	"Ninmizhiyum Enmizhiyum"	K. J. Yesudas, S. Janaki	Poovachal Khader	
