= Bhookambam =

1983 Indian film

- Directed by: Joshiy
- Written by: Priyadarshan
- Produced by: Renji Mathew
- Starring: Prem Nazir; Jaishankar
- Cinematography: N. A. Thara
- Edited by: K. Sankunni
- Music by: Shankar–Ganesh
- Production company: Centenary Productions
- Release date: 21 January 1983
- Country: India
- Language: Malayalam

Bhookambam (transl. Earthquake) is a 1983 Indian Malayalam-language action film directed by Joshiy and written by Priyadarshan. The film stars Prem Nazir, Jaishankar, Srividya, Mohanlal and Cochin Haneefa. The film has musical score by Shankar–Ganesh.

== Cast ==
- Prem Nazir as Mahendran
- Jaishankar as Sethu Varman
- Srividya as Aswathi
- Mohanlal as Raghu
- Shankar as Shankara Panikkar
- Raveendran as Pramod
- Rajkumar Sethupathi as Vinod
- Cochin Haneefa as DSP Anwar
- C. I. Paul as Robert
- Kalaranjini as Susie
- Anuradha
- Prathapachandran as Ram Chand
- Balan K. Nair as Shakthi
- Kunchan as Kora
- Lalu Alex as Michel
- Pattom Sadan as Eerkili
- Y. Vijaya as Sherley
- Swapna as Nisha
- Premanarayanan

== Soundtrack ==
The music was composed by Shankar–Ganesh and the lyrics were written by Bichu Thirumala.

No.	Song	Singers	Lyrics	Length (m:ss)
1	"Alanjori Choodum"	P. Jayachandran, Vani Jairam	Bichu Thirumala	
2	"Bhookambam Manassil"	Vani Jairam	Bichu Thirumala	
3	"Mayilina Chanchadum"	Unni Menon, K. G. Markose	Bichu Thirumala	
4	"Thinkal Bimbame"	K. J. Yesudas	Bichu Thirumal	
