= Veendum =

- Poster
- Directed by: Joshiy
- Written by: Jose Kurian; Dennis Joseph (dialogues)
- Screenplay by: Dennis Joseph
- Starring: Mammootty; Jayashree; Ratheesh; Baiju; Geetu Mohandas
- Cinematography: Anandakuttan
- Edited by: K. Sankunni
- Music by: Songs: Ouseppachan; Score: Guna Singh
- Production company: Vijaya Film Circuit
- Distributed by: Vijaya Film Circuit
- Release date: 9 October 1986
- Country: India
- Language: Malayalam

Veendum is a 1986 Indian Malayalam film, directed by Joshiy starring Mammootty, Ratheesh, Jayashree and Geetu Mohandas in the lead roles. The film has musical score by Guna Singh anf songs by Ouseppachan.

== Cast ==
- Mammootty as Vijaya Chandran
- Jayashree as Lalitha
- Ratheesh as Robert d'Souza
- Lalu Alex as Sukumaran
- Baiju as Bike Passenger
- Geetu Mohandas as Anu
- Kollam Ajith as Robert's henchman
- Kunchan as Kuttappan
- Lalithasree
- M. G. Soman as Alex
- Mala Aravindan as Sreekar (Driver)
- Noohu
- P. K. Abraham
- Rajasekharan
- Santhakumari as Sukumari
- Vettoor Purushan as One of the Ghosts in Morchary (cameo)
- Kothuku Nanappan as One of the Ghosts in Morchary (cameo)

== Synopsis ==
On receiving news that her father is admitted in hospital, Lalitha returns to Kerala with her daughter from Mumbai. Her husband Sukumaran was a journalist in Mumbai and was killed a few years ago by an underworld don, Robert d'Souza, for publishing news against his illegal smuggling activities. Now, as his deals have been on a diminishing note, Robert had returned to Kerala with his remaining valuables. However, Kerala police had received information on his arrival via bus, and he was chased by police. Robert manages to escape from the bus and snatches a bike on the way. The bike skids off the road and Robert has an injury. Police search for him in the nearby vicinity, where they found the bike. Coincidentally, it happens to be the neighbourhood of Lalitha's house. Unaware of the same, Robert breaks into Lalitha's house. Though police arrive for searching Lalitha's house, she assuredly tells them that Robert has not broken into her house. Owing to this, the police leave without searching.

Lalitha then goes to hospital, and returns by evening. She then traces the presence of someone in the house. In order to escape from the stranger in the house, she runs to the car. However, Robert follows her to the car. Robert tries to prevent her from moving. Lalitha bangs him on his head with a torch, and as he is dead, she drops the corpse in the beach and returns as if nothing had happened.

Vijaya Chandran, a businessman, follows Lalitha. Though she is not happy in meeting him, he follows her. Once, he visits Lalitha's father and introduces him as Sukumaran's friend in Mumbai. He also reveals a proposal to Lalitha, which she denies. He then reveals to Lalitha what good friends they were. He is an IPS officer in Mumbai fighting against the underworld. However, after the death of Sukumaran, he is quite a bit down in his approach. She is also informed that Robert is not dead and is still following her. Whether they succeed against Robert concludes the story.

== Music ==
The music was composed by Guna Singh and Ouseppachan with the former composing the score and latter the songs. The lyrics were written by Shibu Chakravarthy.

| No. | Song | Singers | Lyrics | Length (m:ss) |
|---|---|---|---|---|
| 1 | "Doore Maamalayil" | K. J. Yesudas | Shibu Chakravarthy | |
| 2 | "Thenoorum Malar Pootha Poovaadiyil" | K. J. Yesudas, S. Janaki | Shibu Chakravarthy | 5.54 |

== Box office ==
The film was a commercial failure
