= Kudumbasametham =

- Directed by: Jayaraj
- Screenplay by: Kaloor Dennis
- Story by: Ilanjimuttam Rajasekharan Nair
- Produced by: Mumthaz Basheer
- Starring: Manoj K. Jayan; Madhu; Monisha
- Cinematography: S. Kumar
- Edited by: B. Lenin; V. T. Vijayan
- Music by: Johnson
- Production company: Simple Productions
- Distributed by: Simple Release
- Release date: 1992
- Country: India
- Language: Malayalam

Kudumbasametham is a 1992 Malayalam film written by Kaloor Dennis and directed by Jayaraj. The film was produced by Mumthaz Basheer under the banner of Simple Productions. It stars Manoj K. Jayan, Madhu, Monisha and Kaviyoor Ponnamma in the lead roles. This film won the 1992 Kerala State Film Award for Best Screenplay

== Plot ==
Raghavan has suffered for being the son of a classical singer and has come to hate music. What happens after his son Sivan is drawn to music is the rest of the plot.

== Cast ==
- Madhu as Vadekkepat Raghavan Kurup / Govindan Bhagavathar, Raghavan Kurup's late father
- Manoj K. Jayan as Sivashankaran Kurup
- Monisha as Thulasi
- Kaviyoor Ponnamma as Kochukutty Amma, Raghavan Kurup's wife
- Narendra Prasad as Adv. Mahendran Kurup
- Srividya as Radhalakshmi, Thulasi's mother
- Babu Namboothiri as Prabhakaran Kurup
- Maniyanpilla Raju as Sreedharan Kurup
- V. K. Sreeraman as Divakaran Kurup
- K. R. Vatsala as Divakaran's wife
- K.P.A.C. Sunny as Madhavan Kurup
- Sukumari as Rajamma, Madhavan's wife
- Adoor Bhavani as Valiya Peramma
- Adoor Pankajam as Cheriya Peramma (Nani)
- T. P. Madhavan as Temple Committee President
- Vineeth Kumar as Sreedharan's son
- Renuka as Devootty, Sreedharan's wife
- Zeenath as Shyamala, Prabhakaran's wife
- Kanakalatha as Uma, Mahendran's wife

== Awards ==
Kerala State Film Awards (1992)

- Kerala State Film Award for Best Screenplay – Kaloor Dennis

== Soundtrack ==
Kudumbasametham

Soundtrack album by Johnson
- Released: 1992
- Genre: Soundtrack
- Label: Tharangini Music
- Producer: Simple Productions

The music was composed by Johnson .

Track	Song title	Singer(s)	Lyrics	Raga
1	"Entharomahanu"	K. J. Yesudas	Traditional (Thyaharajan)	Sree Ragam
2	"Gokulamthannil"	P. Madhuri	Kaithapram	
3	"Jagadananda"	Neyveli Santhanagopalan, Bombay Jayashree, Sreemathi Soundaram Krishnan, Sreemathi Bindra	Traditional (Thyagarajan)	Naata
4	"Kamalambhike"	K. J. Yesudas, Bombay Jayashree	Kaithapram	Keeravani
5	"Ne Nendhu"	Madhurai G. S. Mani	Traditional (Thyagarajan)	Karnataka Bihag
6	"Neelaravil"	K. J. Yesudas, Minmini	Kaithapram	Sree Ragam
7	"Paahimam"	K. J. Yesudas, Bombay Jayashree	Traditional (Maha Vaidyanathaiyer)	Jana Ranjini
8	"Oonjalirangi"	K. J. Yesudas	Kaithapram	Ragamalika
9	"Oonjalurangi - Female"	Minmini	Kaithapram	Ragamalika
10	"Parthasarathim"	K. J. Yesudas	Kaithapram	Chakravaakam
