= Ivide Ellavarkkum Sukham =

Ivide Ellavarkum Sugham
- Directed by: Jeassy
- Screenplay by: Kaloor Dennis
- Story by: Mrs Irine
- Produced by: K. T. Kunjumon
- Starring: Mohanlal; Karthika; Suresh Gopi; M. G. Soman
- Cinematography: Anandakuttan
- Edited by: K. P. Hariharaputhran
- Music by: G. Devarajan
- Production company: Rachana Films
- Distributed by: Rachana Films
- Release date: 18 February 1987
- Country: India
- Language: Malayalam

Ivide Ellavarkum Sugham, (translation: Everyone is well here) is a 1987 Indian Malayalam-language drama film directed by Jeassy and written by Kaloor Dennis from a story by Mrs Irine. The film stars Mohanlal, Karthika, Suresh Gopi, M. G. Soman in the lead roles. The film has musical score by G. Devarajan.

== Plot ==
Appu (Mohanlal), a poor shepherd, falls in love with the daughter of his boss (Jiji/Karthika). His attempts to win her heart and scheme against his friend Hari lead to unexpected complications.

== Cast ==
- Mohanlal as Appu
- Karthika as Giji Varma
- Suresh Gopi as Haridas
- Lissy as Anitha Mathew
- M. G. Soman as Major Shekara Varma
- Adoor Bhasi as Thampuran
- Lalu Alex as Sethu Raman
- Sankaradi as Lazar
- Innocent as Kariachan
- Sukumari as Fortune-teller with a Parrot
- Jagathy Sreekumar as Sivasankaran Varma
- Baiju Santhosh as Baiju
- Valsala Menon
- Sulakshana

== Soundtrack ==
The music was composed by G. Devarajan and the lyrics were written by O. N. V. Kurup.

No.	Song	Singers	Lyrics
1	"Vellikkudamani"	M. G. Sreekumar, P. Madhuri, Sindhu	O. N. V. Kurup
2	"Rithu Shalabham"	K. J. Yesudas, K. S. Chithra	O. N. V. Kurup
3	"Ethra Manoharam"	K. J. Yesudas	O. N. V. Kurup
