= Malarum Kiliyum =

- Directed by: K. Madhu
- Written by: A. R. Mukesh; Kaloor Dennis (dialogues)
- Screenplay by: Kaloor Dennis
- Produced by: Jagan Appachan
- Starring: Mammootty; Menaka; Ambika; Lalu Alex
- Cinematography: Anandakuttan
- Edited by: V. P. Krishnan
- Music by: Shyam
- Production company: Jagan Pictures
- Distributed by: Jagan Pictures
- Release date: 11 April 1986
- Country: India
- Language: Malayalam

Malarum Kiliyum is a 1986 Indian Malayalam-language film directed by K. Madhu and produced by Jagan Appachan. The film stars Mammootty, Menaka, Ambika and Lalu Alex in the lead roles. It features a musical score by Shyam.

== Cast ==
- Mammootty
- Menaka
- Ambika
- Lalu Alex as Renji
- M. G. Soman
- Sudha Chandran
- Adoor Bhasi
- Jagathy Sreekumar
- Sukumari
- Minu Subash

== Soundtrack ==
The music was composed by Shyam and the lyrics were written by K. Jayakumar.

No.	Song	Singers	Lyrics	Length (m:ss)
1	"En Jeevanil"	K. J. Yesudas, Vani Jairam	K. Jayakumar	
2	"Kandu Njan Kandu"	K. S. Chithra, Krishnachandran	K. Jayakumar	
