= Vannu Kandu Keezhadakki =

- Poster
- Directed by: Joshiy
- Screenplay by: Kaloor Dennis
- Story by: D. N. Mukherjee
- Produced by: Sajan
- Starring: M. G. Soman; Lakshmi; Nadhiya
- Cinematography: Vipin Das
- Edited by: K. Sankunni
- Music by: Shyam
- Production company: Saj Productions
- Release date: 21 November 1985
- Country: India
- Language: Malayalam

Vannu Kandu Keezhadakki (transl. Came, saw, conquered) is a 1985 Indian Malayalam-language film, directed by Joshiy. It is a remake of the Hindi film Khubsoorat. The film stars M. G. Soman, Lakshmi and Nadhiya.

== Plot ==
The head of Mangalath Family, middle-aged Padmavati, wife of Mangalath Viswanatha Menon and mother of Rajan, Suresh, Dr.Ravi and Tinku, is a strict disciplinarian and runs her household by laws. Everyone in the house, follow her laws even though they do not approve of them. Soon, she fixes the marriage of her second son Suresh with Sridevi, who is the daughter of the rich widower Prathapa Chandran and is the elder sister of Manju. After Suresh and Sridevi's marriage, Manju comes to visit Sridevi for some months. Being a playful girl, she quickly gets the disapproval of Padmavati but Ravi falls in love with her. Manju also befriends Viswanatha Menon and gets the trust of everyone in the house except Padmavati. What forms next is the story.

== Cast ==
- Lakshmi as Padmavathi (Menon's wife & Head of Mangalath Family)
- M. G. Soman as Mangalath Viswanatha Menon
- Nadiya Moithu as Manju (Sridevi's younger sister)
- Shankar as Dr. Ravi (Menon & Padmavathi's third son)
- Lalu Alex as Rajan (Menon & Padmavathi's eldest son)
- Surekha as Geetha (Rajan's wife)
- Baby Shalini as Shalu mol (Rajan's daughter)
- Maniyanpilla Raju as Suresh (Menon & Padmavathi's second son)
- Rajalakshmi as Sridevi (Suresh's wife)
- Baiju as Tinku (Menon & Padmavathi's fourth son)
- Thilakan as Thrivikraman Pillai (Viswanatha Menon's friend)
- Jagathy Sreekumar as Warrier or Vakkachan
- Prathapachandran as Sridevi and Manju's Father
- Kunchan as Cassette shop boy

== Soundtrack ==
The music was composed by Shyam and the lyrics were written by Poovachal Khader.

Song	Singers
"Ilam Thooval Veesi"	K. S. Chithra, Chorus
"Ilam Thooval Veesi" (F)	K. S. Chithra
"Mandan Dinamithu"	K. S. Chithra
"Oru Pennum Koode Koottil"	K. S. Chithra
"Oru Pennum Koode Koottil" (M)	Unni Menon
