= Nair Saab =

- Poster
- Directed by: Joshiy
- Written by: Dennis Joseph; Shibu Chakravarthy
- Produced by: Liberty Productions
- Starring: Mammootty; Suresh Gopi; Mukesh; Geetha; Sumalatha; Lizy
- Cinematography: Jayanan Vincent; Anandakuttan
- Edited by: K. Sankunni
- Music by: S. P. Venkatesh
- Distributed by: Liberty Productions
- Release date: 8 September 1989
- Country: India
- Language: Malayalam

Nair Saab is a 1989 Indian Malayalam language action thriller film written by Dennis Joseph, directed by Joshiy, and produced by Liberty Productions. It stars Mammootty, Suresh Gopi, Mukesh, and Geetha. The film was released on the occasion of Onam. This movie depicts the training of new recruits at a fictional army training center, which takes a turn for the absurd when two of them are hired by a drug cartel to import drugs from a neighboring country, which is implied to be Pakistan.

== Plot ==
A new batch of trainees arrives at the army training center (SAT) situated near the border in Kashmir. Their trainer is Major Nair (Mammootty), who is a man known for his hard-and-fast training strategies. The movie is treated with humour arising from the intense training of the guys. But, things take a U-turn when the underworld led by Kumar (Devan) buys out two guys from the batch and uses them for importing drugs from the neighboring country, which is hinted as Pakistan (though never mentioned in the movie).

In the turn of events, one trainee, Antony (Mukesh) is killed by the hands of underworld, while the blame falls on the trainer, Nair. Everybody turns against Nair and he has to flee, only to come back later. The plot thickens as well with the arrival of a smuggler and partner of Kumar, James (Lalu Alex) as the new trainer, Major Nambiar for SAT with the intention to sell the ammunition stored there, which is worth millions, to the enemy state. Nair intervenes at the right time and with the help of his students, spoils all the evil plans of the traitors.

== Cast ==
- Mammootty as Major Ravindran Nair / Nair Saab
- Suresh Gopi as Cadet Gopakumar
- Mukesh as Cadet Antony
- Geetha as Savitri/Radha
- Sumalatha as Prabha
- Lizy as Parvathi
- Vijayaraghavan as Cadet Rishi
- Mohan Jose as Cadet Jose
- K. B. Ganesh Kumar as Cadet Ganeshan
- Siddique as Cadet Siddique
- Maniyanpilla Raju as Cadet Chandran Pillai
- Kunchan as Cadet Mohan
- Devan as Kumar
- Lalu Alex as James/A. K. K. Nambiar
- Jagannatha Varma as Brigadier Varma
- K. P. A. C. Azeez as Devayya
- Mamukkoya as Chef Koya

== Release ==
The film was released on 8 September 1989.

=== Box office ===
The film was a commercial success.

== Music ==
The film had a successful soundtrack composed by S. P. Venkatesh with lyrics by Shibu Chakravarthy.

1. "Hey Giridharane" – Vani Jairam
2. "Pazhayoru Paattile" – Sujatha Mohan, M. G. Sreekumar
3. "Punchavayalu" – M. G. Sreekumar
