= Kodathy =

- Directed by: Joshiy
- Written by: Prathapachandran; Kaloor Dennis (dialogues)
- Screenplay by: Kaloor Dennis
- Produced by: Prathapachandran
- Starring: Ratheesh; Mammootty; Seema; Prathapachandran
- Cinematography: N. A. Thara
- Edited by: K. Sankunni
- Music by: Shyam
- Production company: Anoop Films
- Distributed by: Anoop Films
- Release date: 26 January 1984
- Country: India
- Language: Malayalam

Kodathy is a 1984 Indian Malayalam courtroom drama film directed by Joshiy and produced by Prathapachandran. The film stars Ratheesh, Mammootty, Seema, and Prathapachandran in the lead roles. The film has musical score by Shyam.

== Cast ==
- Ratheesh as Kumar
- Mammootty as Chandhran
- Seema as Kavitha
- Kaviyoor Ponnamma as Venu's mother
- Prathapachandran as Police officer
- Jalaja as Karthika
- M. G. Soman as Venu
- Sukumari as Saraswathiyamma
- T. G. Ravi as Divakaran
- Kuthiravattom Pappu as Antony
- Jagathy Sreekumar as Vasu
- Anju as Minimol
- Lalu Alex as Das
- KPAC Sunny as Advocate

== Soundtrack ==
The music was composed by Shyam and the lyrics were written by Poovachal Khader.

No.	Song	Singers	Lyrics	On screen
1	"Harshabashpam"	P.Jayachandran	Poovachal Khader	Mammootty and Jalaja
2	"Nilaavin Poykayil"	K. J. Yesudas, S. Janaki		Soman, Seema, Lalualex
