= Muhurtham Pathnonnu Muppathinu =

Muhurtham Pathinonnu Muppathinu
- Poster
- Directed by: Joshiy
- Starring: Mammootty; Ratheesh; Saritha; Jagathy Sreekumar
- Music by: Shyam
- Release date: 25 January 1985
- Country: India
- Language: Malayalam

Muhurtham Pathinonnu Muppathinu is a 1985 Indian Malayalam film, directed by Joshiy. The film stars Mammootty, Ratheesh, Saritha and Jagathy Sreekumar in the lead roles. The film has musical score by Shyam.

== Cast ==
- Mammootty as Haridas
- Ratheesh as Jayan
- Saritha as Indu
- Baby Shalini as Raji
- Lalu Alex as Tony
- Jagathy Sreekumar as Lazar
- V. D. Rajappan as Narayanan
- Prathapachandran as Father
- Kannur Sreelatha as Reetha
- Kunchan as Lonappan
- Lalithasree as Sophiyamma
- Paravoor Bharathan as Dr. Warrier
- Surekha as Dr. Neelima Abraham
- P. K. Abraham as Monsignor Kurishingal
- KPAC Sunny as Indu's father
- Remadevi as Molly

== Soundtrack ==
The music was composed by Shyam and the lyrics were written by Poovachal Khader.

No.	Song	Singers	Lyrics	Length (m:ss)
1	"Ayyayyo Ammavi"	Vani Jairam, Krishnachandran	Poovachal Khader	
2	"Nishayude Thaazhvarayil"	K. J. Yesudas, K. S. Chithra	Poovachal Khader	

Artists: Poovachal Khader, Shyam Label: Ranjini Cassettes Release date: 21 January 1985 Genre: Film Scores
