= Inakkily =

Inakkilly
- Directed by: Joshi
- Written by: Cochin Haneefa; John Paul
- Produced by: Joshi
- Starring: Prem Nazir; Balan K. Nair; Cochin Haneefa; Lalu Alex
- Cinematography: N. A. Thara
- Edited by: K. Sankunny
- Music by: Shyam
- Release date: 1 January 1984
- Country: India
- Language: Malayalam

Inakkili is a 1984 Indian Malayalam film, directed by Joshiy and produced by M. D. George. The film stars Prem Nazir, Sasikala, Balan K. Nair and Cochin Haneefa in the lead roles. The film has musical score by Shyam.

== Plot ==
Johnny and Nimmy are schoolmates who fall deeply in love. When Nimmy's father, Alexander, discovers their relationship, he is enraged - and shoots Johnny dead. Devastated by his son's murder, Johnny's father, Zachariah, seeks revenge and kills Alexander. Overcome with grief, Nimmy dies at Johnny's grave, and in death, the two lovers are finally reunited.

== Cast ==
- Manoj as Johnny
- Sasikala as Nimmy
- Sukumaran as Father
- Prem Nazir as Zachariah
- Balan K. Nair as Alexander
- Lalu Alex as Raju
- Cochin Haneefa as Peter
- Paravoor Bharathan as Mathai
- Seema as Johny's mother
- M.O Devasya

== Soundtrack ==
The music was composed by Shyam and the lyrics were written by Poovachal Khader.

| No. | Song | Singers | Lyrics | Length (m:ss) |
|---|---|---|---|---|
| 1 | "Chollam Nin Kaathil" | K. J. Yesudas, S. Janaki | Poovachal Khader | |
| 2 | "Ente Manomayee" | K. J. Yesudas, S. Janaki | Poovachal Khader | |
| 3 | "Kannippunnaarakkiliye" | K. J. Yesudas, S. Janaki | Poovachal Khader | |
| 4 | "Kannippunnaarakkiliye" (Pathos Bit) | K. J. Yesudas | Poovachal Khader | |
| 5 | "Madhumaasam Poyallo" | K. J. Yesudas, Lathika | Poovachal Khader | |
| 6 | "Vinnin Vellippookkal" | K. J. Yesudas, S. Janaki, Chorus | Poovachal Khader | |
