= January Oru Orma =

- Promotional poster
- Directed by: Joshiy
- Written by: A. R. Mukesh; Kaloor Dennis (dialogues)
- Screenplay by: Kaloor Dennis
- Starring: Mohanlal; Suresh Gopi; Karthika; Jayabharathi
- Cinematography: Jayanan Vincent
- Edited by: K. Sankunni
- Music by: Ouseppachan
- Production company: Tharangini Films
- Distributed by: Tharangini Films
- Release date: 23 January 1987
- Country: India
- Language: Malayalam

January Oru Orma (transl. January, a memory) is a 1987 Indian Malayalam-language romance film, directed by Joshiy, written by A. R. Mukesh, based on a screenplay by Kaloor Dennis. The film was produced by Tharanjini Films. The film stars Mohanlal and Karthika in the lead roles, while Suresh Gopi, M. G. Soman and Jayabharathi appear in supporting roles. The film was a commercial success at the box office. It was declared a super hit. The film features a musical score by Ouseppachan.

== Plot ==
Raju is an orphan trying to make a living as a tourist guide in Kodaikanal. But he is constantly discouraged from this act by the local police inspector Dinesh nicknamed "Minnal". He befriends Vishwanatha Menon, Padmavathi and Nimmi, who start treating him like family. He soon becomes their constant accompaniment in their temporary stay at the bungalow. It is later revealed that Nimmi is Padmavathi's niece, whose father deceased 3 years ago. The couple's son Vinod soon joins them. Vinod is a spoilt brat and is often seen taunting Myna, a local girl who Raju considers his sister. In the course of time, Nimmi falls in love with Raju and Vinod, in an attempt to trap Raju, accuses him of stealing his mother's jewellery. The charges are soon dropped when the missing jewellery is found in Vinod's bag. This causes a rift in the relationship between Raju and the family. Vinod runs into Myna and taunts her again Myna tells Vinod to leave which infuriated him and he chased Myna through a forest to a cliff. Myna begs Vinod not to hurt her but Vinod just smirks. Then Myna loses her balance, slips on a rock, falls off the cliff and dies. Appu, Myna's lover, later reveals to Raju that reason behind her death is Vinod. A distraught Raju, who was until then unaware of Vinod's behaviour towards Myna, goes in search of him. The two men end up in a brawl and Vinod is taken to custody by inspector Dinesh, who interrupts the fight. A heartbroken Raju decides to leave the town, but is stopped by Father Fernandez, who runs the orphanage in which Raju was born. Fernandez hands over a letter to Raju and asks him to deliver it, saying the person would help him find a job. The Fr. also shows Raju a photograph of the addressee, Dr. Jayadevan, an old friend of his. Raju instantly recognises the person in the photograph as Nimmi's father and is intrigued by the words in the letter which he reads without the Fr's knowledge. He then confronts Fr. Fernandez into saying the truth behind his birth. It is revealed that Raju is Padmavathi's son from a pre-marital affair she had with Dr. Jayadevan's friend, Venugopal, who unfortunately died in an air crash and that she was forced into believing that her child was still-born. A shocked Raju goes on to see his mother one last time. At the same time, Vinod, released on bail, plans a plot to kill Raju in order to save himself from getting caught for Myna's murder. In a turn of events, the family also gets to know that Raju is their blood relation and a guilty Vinod goes to save Raju from getting killed. The tale ends on a sad note when Raju is unknowingly murdered by Myna's father Ponnayyan, who was aiming for Vinod for killing his own daughter and for trying to kill Raju, whom Ponnayyan considered his own son.

== Cast ==
- Mohanlal as Raju
- Karthika as Nimmy
- Suresh Gopi as Vinod
- M. G. Soman as Menon
- Jayabharathi as Padmavathi
- Rohini as Maina
- Raghu as Appu
- Priya
- Lalu Alex as Minnal Dineshan
- Jagathi Sreekumar as Authorized Joseph
- Manian Pillai Raju as Narayana Swamy
- Prathapachandran as Fr. Fernandez
- Karamana Janardanan Nair as Ponnayyan

== Soundtrack ==
The music was composed by Ouseppachan and the lyrics were written by Shibu Chakravarthy.

No.	Song	Singers	Lyrics	Length (m:ss)
1	"Ponnushassinte"	K. J. Yesudas	Shibu Chakravarthy	
2	"Pookkaitha Pookkunna"	K. J. Yesudas	Shibu Chakravarthy	
3	"Swagatham Othumee"	K. J. Yesudas	Shibu Chakravarthy	

== Box office ==
The film was a commercial success at the box office. It was declared a super hit. The film ran for over 150 days in 2 theatres with a regular show in Sangeetha theatre, Ernakulam.
