= Karthavyam (1982 film) =

- Directed by: Joshiy
- Screenplay by: Kaloor Dennis
- Story by: K. Balachander
- Produced by: Jagan Appachan
- Starring: Madhu; Jagathy Sreekumar; Sankaradi; M. G. Soman
- Cinematography: N. A. Thara
- Edited by: K. Sankunni
- Music by: Sathyam
- Production company: Jagan Pictures
- Release date: 26 August 1982
- Country: India
- Language: Malayalam

Karthavyam is a 1982 Indian Malayalam-language film, directed by Joshiy and produced by Jagan Appachan. The film stars Madhu, Jagathy Sreekumar, Sankaradi and M. G. Soman. The screenplay is Kaloor Dennis' adaptation of K. Balachander's play Major Chandrakanth.

== Cast ==
- Madhu as Major Ramkumar
- Jagathy Sreekumar as Mohanan
- Sankaradi as Menon
- M. G. Soman as Srikumar
- Master Suresh
- Merly
- Ravikumar as Krishna Kumar
- Sripriya as Geetha

== Soundtrack ==
The music was composed by Sathyam and the lyrics were written by R. K. Damodaran.

Song	Singers
"Kalyaana Sadyakku"	K. J. Yesudas
"Kathirmandapam"	
"Neerada Hamsam"	K. J. Yesudas, Vani Jairam
"Oru Naal"	Vani Jairam
"Pengalkku" (Sad Bit)	K. J. Yesudas
"Poove Kannippoove"	Vani Jairam
