= Kodungattu =

- Poster
- Directed by: Joshiy
- Screenplay by: Pappanamkodu Lakshmanan
- Produced by: Thiruppathi Chettiyar
- Starring: Prem Nazir; Mammootty; Madhu; K. P. Ummer; Jose Prakash; Srividya
- Cinematography: J. Williams
- Music by: K. J. Joy
- Production company: Evershine Productions
- Distributed by: Evershine Productions
- Release date: 19 August 1983
- Country: India
- Language: Malayalam

Kodungattu is a 1983 Indian Malayalam film, directed by Joshiy and produced by Thiruppathi Chettiyar. The film stars Prem Nazir, Madhu, K. P. Ummer, Jose Prakash, and Srividya in the lead roles. The film has musical score by K. J. Joy.

== Cast ==
- Prem Nazir as DSP Sudheendran IPS
- Madhu as DSP Balachandran IPS, Sudheendran's brother
- K. P. Ummer as IG R.C Sekharan Thampi IPS
- Srividya as Sujatha
- Jose Prakash as DSP Jayadevan IPS
- Mammootty as Musthafa
- Shankar as Rajan, son of Sudheendran
- Sumalatha as Sreekala, daughter of Balachandran
- Jalaja as Sindhu Sadanandan
- Cochin Haneefa as Vijayan
- Balan K Nair as Bullet Raghavan
- Prathapachandran as Sadanandan
- Ravi Kumar as Circle Inspector
- Bheeman Raghu as Chandru
- Jagathy Sreekumar as Head Constable Kuttan Pilla
- Rajalakshmi as Jameela
- Anuradha
- Meena (actress) child artist

== Soundtrack ==
The music was composed by K. J. Joy and the lyrics were written by Poovachal Khader.

No.	Song	Singers	Length (m:ss)
1	"Ennu Nira Sandhyathan"	P. Susheela	
2	"Sallallahu" (Allipperayudichu)	K. J. Yesudas, Vani Jairam, Chorus	
3	"Sirakaliluyarum Kodumkaattu"	Vani Jairam	
