= Aa Raathri =

- VCD cover
- Directed by: Joshiy
- Written by: Kaloor Dennis
- Produced by: Joy Thomas
- Starring: Mammootty; Poornima Bhagyaraj
- Edited by: K. Sankunni
- Music by: Ilaiyaraaja
- Production company: Jubilee Productions
- Release date: 23 April 1983
- Country: India
- Language: Malayalam

Aa Raathri (transl. That night) is a 1983 Indian Malayalam-language drama film directed by Joshiy and written by Kaloor Dennis, with Mammootty and Poornima Bhagyaraj , M. G. Soman , Rohini , Lalu Alex appear in supporting roles. The film follows the life of a happy family and how a set of unfortunate events ruin their lives. The film's songs were composed by Ilaiyaraaja, with lyrics written by Poovachal Khader.The film was a blockbuster.

== Plot ==
Ravi, a banker, and Indu, a homemaker raised in an orphanage, live happily in Trivandrum with their daughter Minimol. Abdu, a professional false witness in court, is shaken after his lies cause an innocent man’s family to die; he reforms and becomes a fish monger.

On a train journey, Ravi and Indu meet Radha, fleeing her abusive stepfather to find her fiancé Venu in Trivandrum. Radha stays with them until Ravi helps her secure a job at YWCA. Meanwhile, Venu, though decent, has immoral friends.

One night at the cinema, Indu mistakes Venu for harassing her and publicly humiliates him. His friends, seeking revenge, abduct and rape Indu. Ravi supports her recovery, but despite wanting to withdraw the case, they proceed. In court, Abdu betrays them with false testimony, and the culprits go free. Later, he discovers Indu is his lost sister. Devastated, Indu commits suicide.

Radha learns Venu was innocent and that he had tried to save Indu, but his friends were the true culprits. Ravi seeks revenge, but Radha reveals her marriage to Venu. When Abdu kidnaps Minimol, he confesses his past and guilt. Finally, Ravi and Abdu kill the two criminals. The story ends with Minimol in Radha and Venu’s care as police arrest Ravi.

== Cast ==
- Mammootty as Ravi
- Poornima Bhagyaraj as Indhu
- M. G. Soman as Abdu/Gopi
- Ratheesh as Venu
- Lalu Alex as Babu
- Cochin Haneefa as Sabu
- Rohini as Radha
- Anju as Minikutty
- Prathapachandran
- Philomina
- Jagathy Sreekumar as Sundereshan
- Sukumari
- Kunchan as Shani
- K. P. A. C. Sunny
- Kothuku Nanappan as Rahim master

== Soundtrack ==
The remastered version of song Kiliye Kiliye was used in intro of heroine (Kalyani Priyadarshan) in 2025 Malayalam movie Lokah Chapter 1: Chandra directed by Dominic Arun.

All lyrics are written by Poovachal Khader; all music is composed by Ilaiyaraaja

No.	Title	Artist(s)	Length
1.	"Ee Neelima Than Chaaruthayil"	K. J. Yesudas, S. Janaki
2.	"Karayaano Mizhineeril"	K. J. Yesudas
3.	"Kiliye Kiliye"	S. Janaki
4.	"Maarolsavam"	P. Jayachandran, Kalyanam, Krishnachandran
