= Mahayanam =

- Poster designed by Gayathri Ashokan
- Directed by: Joshiy
- Written by: A. K. Lohithadas
- Produced by: C. T. Rajan
- Starring: Mammootty; Mukesh; Seema; Balan K. Nair
- Cinematography: Jayanan Vincent
- Edited by: K. Sankunni
- Music by: Songs: Ouseppachan; Background Score: S. P. Venkatesh
- Production company: Honey Productions
- Distributed by: Jubilee Pictures
- Release date: 3 November 1989
- Country: India
- Language: Malayalam

Mahayanam is a 1989 Indian Malayalam-language film directed by Joshiy and produced by C. T. Rajan, starring Mammootty, Seema, Jalaja and Mukesh.

== Plot ==
Chandran is a lorry driver who is known for his arrogance and rudeness towards others. On the other hand, Ravi, who works as a helper in the same lorry, is a family man who always talks about his wife, Remani, and his mother. Despite his behaviour, Chandran is very affectionate towards Ravi and considers him as a younger brother. When Chandran is not working, he spends most of his leisure time drinking alcohol, while Ravi is busy saving money to fulfil his dream of building a house. One day, Ravi receives a letter from his wife, Remani, inviting him to their village for the annual temple festival. Excited about the invitation, Ravi informs Chandran that he will be leaving for the village and will return after two weeks. However, tragedy strikes when Ravi gets into an accident on the way to his village and loses his life. Instead of Ravi, now Chandran arrives at Ravi's village with his dead body. Upon understanding the unfortunate situation that Ravi's family was in, Chandran decided to stay for a few days to fulfil Ravi's last wish of constructing a house. During his stay, Chandran became involved with the people of the village, including Kochu Varkey, a wealthy businessman, his son Sunnykkutty, Rajamma, a courageous and independent woman, and her brother Rameshan. Chandran's interactions with these individuals, along with a series of unexpected events, shook up his life and turned everything upside down.

== Cast ==
- Mammootty as Chandran Aka Idiyan Chandru
- Seema as Rajamma (Voice dubbed by Anandavally)
- Mukesh as Ravi (Extended cameo)
- Balan K. Nair as Bava
- Vineeth as Ramesan
- Kunjandi as Matthu
- Mala Aravindan as Govindankutty
- Kuthiravattom Pappu as Barber Kunjappan
- Prathapachandran as Kochu Varkey
- Vijayaraghavan as Sunnykutty, Kochu Varkey's son
- Jalaja as Ramani, Ravi's wife
- Philomina as Janamma, Ravi's mother
- Saleema as Mollykutty
- Soorya as Karthu
- Vinodh Kozhikode as Velayudhan
- Appa Haja as Bava's Son
- Thodupuzha Vasanthi as Nurse
- PC George as Churuli Paramu
- Narendra Nath as Karyapuzha Kunharu
- Ajith Kollam a Henchmen

== Soundtrack ==
- "Urakkam Kankalil" (male) - M. G. Sreekumar
- "Urakkam Kankalil" (female) - K. S. Chithra

== Release ==
The film was released on 1989

=== Reception ===
The film was a commercial failure, leaving producer C. T. Rajan in severe financial debt. He never produced another film. In 2016, Rajan's son, Rony David Raj, recounted his father's ordeal at that time.

== Trivia ==
- Mammootty won the 1989 Kerala State Film Award for Best Actor.
- After Mahayanam, Seema took a long break from acting. Later she made a comeback through Olympiyan Anthony Adam in 1999.
- The film was remade in Tamil as Paarai with R. Sarathkumar.
