= Appu (1990 film) =

1990 Indian film by Dennis Joseph

- VCD cover
- Directed by: Dennis Joseph
- Written by: Sreekumaran Thampi
- Produced by: G. P. Vijayakumar
- Starring: Mohanlal
- Cinematography: Santosh Sivan; A. V. Thomas
- Edited by: K. Sankunni
- Music by: T. Sundararajan (songs); S. P. Venkatesh (score)
- Production company: Seven Arts Films
- Distributed by: Seven Arts Release
- Release date: 1990
- Running time: 139 minutes
- Country: India
- Language: Malayalam

Appu is a 1990 Indian Malayalam-language drama thriller film directed by Dennis Joseph and written by Sreekumaran Thampi. It was produced by G. P. Vijayakumar of Seven Arts Films. The film stars Mohanlal as the title character. The film follows Appu who becomes a suspect in a murder case and his efforts to find the culprits. The film has songs composed by T. Sundararajan and background score by S. P. Venkatesh. The cinematography and editing were handled by Santosh Sivan and K. Sankunni respectively.

== Cast ==
- Mohanlal as Appu alias Appukuttan
- Murali as Gopan
- Sunitha as Sarojini, Appu's love interest
- Tulasi as Sugandhi, Stage Artist
- Roopa as Remani, Gopan's Wife
- Vijayaraghavan as Ramankutty
- Nedumudi Venu as Chandikunju
- K. R. Vijaya as Mangalath Amma
- Captain Raju as Suresh
- Lalu Alex as Advocate Prabhakaran
- K. P. A. C. Lalitha as Alamelu
- M. G. Soman as Police officer
- Alummoodan as Pushkaran
- Janardhanan as Janardhana Kaimal
- Zainuddin as Ramanan
- Balan K. Nair as Abu
- Jagannathan as Thamarakshan
- Rajan P. Dev as Varma
- Kundara Johny as Vijayan
- Kanakalatha as Elizabeth

== Production ==
The film was the third directorial by Dennis Joseph after Manu Uncle (1988) and Adharvam (1989). The screenplay was written by Sreekumaran Thampi. G. P. Vijayakumar produced the film under the banner of Seven Arts Films.

Mahabalipuram was one of the filming locations. The film was shot in Adoor and places such as Mammoodu Junction and Pandalam Thekkekara.

Santosh Sivan was the cinematographer for nearly the first half of the movie, while AV Thomas, another FTII Pune alumnus, handled the second half, according to Dennis Joseph, the film's director.

== Music ==
Appu

Soundtrack album by T. Sundararajan
- Released: 1990
- Genre: Feature film soundtrack
- Length: 10:04
- Language: Malayalam
- Label: Satyam Audios
External audio
- Audio Jukebox on YouTube

The songs are composed by T. Sundararajan, while the lyrics are written by Sreekumaran Thampi. S. P. Venkatesh provided the background score. M. G. Sreekumar sang the song "Koothambalathil Vecho". "Orikkal Nee Chirichal" was sung by M. G. Sreekumar and Sujatha Mohan. In a program named Charithram Enniloode on Safari TV, Dennis Joseph said that he approached T. Sundararajan, who was the harmonist of Ilaiyaraaja, to direct the music for the film. Appu is the only film to have music composed by T. Sundararajan.

Track listing
No.	Title	Singer(s)	Length
1.	"Koothambalathil Vecho"	M. G. Sreekumar	5:00
2.	"Orikkal Nee Chirichal"	M. G. Sreekumar, Sujatha Mohan	5:04
Total length:			10:04
