= Koottinilamkili =

- Theatrical release poster
- Directed by: Sajan
- Written by: Prabhakar Puthur; Kaloor Dennis (dialogues)
- Screenplay by: Kaloor Dennis
- Produced by: P. T. Xavier
- Starring: Sukumari; Mammootty; Adoor Bhasi; Maniyanpilla Raju
- Cinematography: Divakara Menon
- Edited by: V. P. Krishnan
- Music by: Shyam
- Production company: Vijaya Productions
- Distributed by: Vijaya Productions
- Release date: 25 June 1984
- Country: India
- Language: Malayalam

Koottinilamkili is a 1984 Indian Malayalam film, directed by Sajan and produced by P. T. Xavier. The film stars Sukumari, Mammootty, Adoor Bhasi and Maniyanpilla Raju in the lead roles. The film has musical score by Shyam.

== Plot ==
Krishnanunni comes from an oppressed low caste; he studies and becomes an IAS Officer. Radhika is the daughter of Valiyakurup from a high caste, and she works as a stenographer for Krishnanunni. They both are from the same village and Krishnanunni liked her, but wasn't able to marry her due to caste restrictions that othered and ostracised him. Krishnanunni has to deal with corrupt politicians and officials in his daily work life. One such corrupt politician knows about Krishnanunni's past love story with Radhika. When he sees that Krishnanunni is not bending the laws and policies for him, he uses the love story for character assassination. The story further explores how Krishnanunni's and Radhika's life is affected after these related events.

== Cast ==
- Mammootty as Krishnanunni
- Sukumari as Sharadamma
- Adoor Bhasi as Valiyakurup
- Maniyanpilla Raju as Gopan
- Menaka as Radhika
- Unnimary as Mallika
- Kuchan as Narayana bhatt
- Baby Shalini as Nandinikutty
- Jose Prakash as Raman Nair
- Balan K. Nair as Yousuf Ikka
- Lalu Alex as Vikraman
- Prathapachandran as Menon
- Thilakan as Devasya
- Lalitha Sree as Parvathy
- M. G. Soman as Balachandran
- Innocent as clerk
- Mala Aravindan as Govinda Pilla
- Thodupuzha Vasanthy as clerk
- Cochin Haneefa as roommate
- Thodupuzha Radhakrishnan as news reporter

== Soundtrack ==
The music was composed by Shyam and the lyrics were written by Chunakkara Ramankutty.

No.	Song	Singers	Lyrics	Length (m:ss)
1	"Illikkaadukalil"	K. J. Yesudas, Lathika	Chunakkara Ramankutty	
2	"Innente Khalbile"	Unni Menon, K. P. Brahmanandan, Krishnachandran	Chunakkara Ramankutty	
3	"Kilukkaam Petti"	S. Janaki, P. Jayachandran	Chunakkara Ramankutty	
4	"Vasanthavum Theril"	Vani Jairam	Chunakkara Ramankutty	
