= Manthrika Kuthira =

- Film VCD cover
- Directed by: Viji Thampi
- Written by: Kaloor Dennis
- Story by: Kummanam Said
- Produced by: PT Abraham, Jose Mathew
- Starring: Manoj K. Jayan; Vani Viswanath; Mohini; Lalu Alex; Baburaj; Dileep
- Cinematography: Saloo George
- Edited by: A. Sreekar Prasad
- Music by: Tomin J Thachankary
- Release date: 1996
- Country: India
- Language: Malayalam

Manthrika Kuthira (transl. Magic Horse) is a 1996 Malayalam erotic crime thriller film directed by Viji Thampi, starring Manoj K. Jayan, Vani Viswanath and Mohini in the lead roles.The film ran more than 30 days in theatres.

== Plot ==
The film start with a police squad led by Circle Inspector Venugopal adventurously arresting Kondotty Jaffar, who is wanted for murder and the rape of four women. Public prosecutor Sunny Kuruvilla manages to get Jaffar convicted. On being sentenced to 40 years in prison, Jaffar threatens to murder Sunny and his family.

Sunny leads a happy life with his wife Ancy and a young daughter who is studying in a boarding school away from home. Sunny is a popular novelist as well with a great female following, which Ancy is not happy about. The couple leads a romantic life. Ancy's sister Sonia, a college student also visit them often. Jose Kuruvilla, Sunny's younger brother is an aspiring but unsuccessful film director. He brands himself as Prem Gandhi and is in love with Sonia, but fails to reveal his heart to her.

The couple along with Jose, Sonia and Sunny's parents set out to Ootty to visit their daughter in boarding school. Unbeknownst to them, Jaffar escapes from prison and evades attempts by Police to catch him. Police officer Venugopal tries to warn Sunny, but fails to reach him. Ancy gets injured when the car collides with a truck in Ootty.

Back home, Venugopal arranges two constables on duty for protecting Sunny and family against any attacks from Jaffar. Ancy is prescribed complete bed rest for three months. This temporarily prevents a sexual relationship and leads to frustrations between the couple. Ancy also becomes suspicious of Sunny's interaction with Sonia. Ancy insists Sonia to go back to her hostel. Jose accompanies her to Trivandrum.

Jose, on returning home, hears a gunshot while talking to the policemen on duty. Ancy is found shot dead in her bedroom with a revolver nearby. Sunny was outside at dinner with friends at that time. Jaffar was seen entering the compound before the incident. Postmortem reports reveals that Ancy has consumed an overdose of sleeping pills before death. Venugopal starts investigating the death and identifies the presence of Jaffar on the scene from a footprint leading up to Ancy's room.

Sonia receives a suicide note from Ancy in the post a few days later. As a death wish, Ancy pleads with Sonia to take care of her daughter. A visibly depressed Sunny takes to alcohol. The parents arrange a marriage between Sunny and Sonia. Though both of them hesitate initially, eventually they get married. On the first night, Sonia is startled to see Jaffar staring through the bedroom window. He runs off when Sunny wakes up.

Sonia finds the manuscript of a novel written by Sunny. She is aware that this is unpublished as Sunny requested the publisher not to. She is startled to discover that a part of the novel contains the exact suicide note that she received from Ancy. When she cross-checks with the copy of the manuscript from the publisher, she finds that the part with the suicide note is missing. Sonia tries to resist the advances of Sunny to have a physical relationship. Sonia also finds Ancy's diary which described Sunny's infatuation towards Sonia and his abusive behavior when confronted. Sonia confides in Venugopal.

Sunny finds his home deserted on reaching home that night. He receives a telephone call from Jaffer and immediately sets off to meet him. They meet in an abandoned building where Jaffer tries to blackmail Sunny. Sunny tries to shoot Jaffer when Venugopal, who set up the meeting, intervenes. Jaffar reveals that he witnessed Sunny murdering Ancy with a revolver after giving her milk overdosed with sleeping pills. During the subsequent altercation, Sunny kills Jaffer and Venugopal. He goes looking for Sonia and attacks her and her father, but in the ensuing struggle is knocked into a pool live with electricity, as Sonia watches in shock.

The film ends with Sunny locked up in a mental asylum with Sonia and his daughter visiting him, where he has scribbled the name "Ancy" across the walls within his confined cell.

== Cast ==
- Manoj K. Jayan as Adv.Sunny Kuruvilla
- Vani Viswanath as Ancy Sunny
- Dileep as Jose Kuruvilla a.k.a. Prem Gandhi a.k.a. Josootty
- Mohini as Sonia Cherian
- Lalu Alex as Venugopal
- Baburaj as Kondotty Jaffar
- Viji Thampi as Mathew Varghese
- Janardhanan as Kunjukutty
- Jagannatha Varma as Cheriyachan
- Kalabhavan Mani as Baby, Sunny's Assistant
- N F Varghese as Police Officer
- Darshana as Maya, House maid

== Legal conflict ==
In 1996, writer Sunil Parameswaran filed a case against Viji Thampi alleging that the film was plagiarized from his drama Swapnam Page No. 32. However, the verdict was in favour of Viji Thampi.
