= Airport (1993 film) =

1993 film directed by Joshi

- Poster
- Directed by: Joshiy
- Written by: Gokula Krishnan & Guna (Dialogue)
- Screenplay by: S. N. Swamy
- Story by: S. N. Swamy
- Produced by: G. Padmavathi
- Starring: Sathyaraj; Gautami; M. G. Soman
- Cinematography: Jayanan Vincent
- Edited by: K. K. Balan
- Music by: S. P. Venkatesh
- Production company: Madhu Films International
- Release date: 9 December 1993
- Country: India
- Language: Tamil

Airport is a 1993 Indian Tamil-language action thriller film directed by Joshi and written by S. N. Swamy. The film stars Sathyaraj, Gautami and M. G. Soman. Unlike most Indian films of that time and genre, it has no songs. The film, released on 9 December 1993, received critical acclaim but underperformed at the box office.

== Plot ==
Captain Arjun is a pilot, who works in Indian Airlines, but only flies government planes. Once, a Union Minister calls him and tells him that his daughter, who has gone on a tour to the Pakistan border along with her friends, has been kidnapped by terrorists. The Minister asks him to bring his daughter safely, and Sathyaraj agrees to it. He flies a private helicopter to the border to bring her back, and he succeeds. Actually, the girl and her friends are terrorists whose mission is to kill the prime minister, which is the minister's master plan. One of the terrorists unknowingly leaves his passport in the helicopter. This is noticed, and Sathyaraj is arrested by Varma the police officer, since he took the helicopter in his name to transport the terrorists. Sathyaraj's widowed mother and his sister are tortured by the police. Nassar files a case on Sathyaraj for terrorist activity and weapons handling.

Sathyaraj is arrested, spends time in jail and is released after two years. Once, while chasing the minister's henchman in the streets of Delhi, he finds his sister, who was missing after his arrest two years earlier. He learns about his mother's death from Varma, the police officer. Finally, Sathyaraj plans to expose the minister to the public red handed, with the help of Jaishankar, the police I.G. But the situation worsens when the Minister takes Meenu and Captain Arjun's sister as hostages. Finally, Sathyaraj fights and kills the minister and his henchmen in a fight in the desert. The movie ends with Sathyaraj returning as a commercial pilot. They live happily ever after.

== Cast ==
- Sathyaraj as Captain Arjun
- Gautami as Meenu
- M. G. Soman as Senior Minister Krishnamoorthy
- Jaishankar
- Nassar as Varma
- Charle
- Sumithra
- Suchitra as Uma
- Yuvasri
- Ponnambalam
- Thalapathy Dinesh
- Ajay Ratnam
- Babu Antony
- Lalu Alex
- Ajith Kollam
- Jagannatha Varma as PM
- Vijay Menon as Vijay Menon
- Raja Krishnamurthy
- Appa Haja

== Reception ==
Malini Mannath of The Indian Express wrote, "Joshi's [..] treatment is skillful. [sic] The script is taut and imaginative." K. Vijiyan of New Straits Times wrote, "Airport could have been a big hit if it had better music, a little comedy and better photography". R. P. R. of Kalki criticised the logical mistakes in the film and panned the story as cliched but praised the film for not having songs and concluded by mockingly giving deepest sympathies to Malayalam Joshi, and the second sympathies to fans.

== See also ==
- List of Indian films without songs
