= Joshiy =

Indian filmmaker

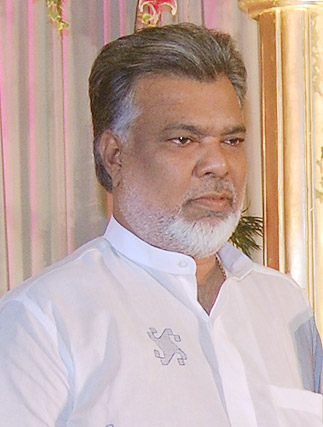
- Born: 18 July 1952 (age 74); Varkala, Thiruvananthapuram, India
- Occupation: Film director
- Years active: 1978 – present
- Spouse: Sindhu Joshi
- Children: 2

Joshiy (born 18 July 1952) is an Indian film director who works predominantly in Malayalam cinema and also directed Tamil, Hindi, Telugu and Kannada-language films. Some of which were remade from his own directional Malayalam films.

Joshiy made his directorial debut in the 1978 film Tiger Salim, but it was the 1980 film Moorkhan that was his breakthrough in Malayalam cinema. He is regarded as the pioneer of film noir and action thrillers in Malayalam.

== Early life ==
Joshiy, the sixth child of Vasudevan and Gowri, was raised in Varkala, Thiruvananthapuram, India, alongside his eight siblings—three brothers and five sisters. His father, Vasudevan, worked as a canteen operator at the Singapore Naval Base before returning to India to establish a cinema theatre. Varkala Sasi, Joshiy's father died when he was six years old, after which his elder brother Shashankan and brother-in-law Sreenivasan (who named him Joshy) took on family responsibilities and expanded the theater business by opening two additional theatres: Varkala Vasu and Attingal Gowri. Varkala Sasi hosted both film screenings and stage plays, providing Joshiy early exposure to art.

Joshiy attended Sree Narayana College, Cherthala, but left without completing his degree. Joshiy, who showed little interest in formal education, declined an offer from Sreenivasan to join the Pune Film Institute, preferring instead to explore opportunities directly in the film industry. During college, he and his junior, Ratheesh—who would later become an actor—were recruited with 30 other students as junior artists in the 1969 film Koottukudumbam, appearing as spectators in a dance scene featuring Sheela and Sarada.

== Career ==
In 1969, at the age of 20 and during his final year of college, Joshiy left school to pursue opportunities as an assistant director. He moved to Chennai to try his luck in the film industry and began his career working under renowned directors M. Krishnan Nair and J. Sasikumar. He also assisted Crossbelt Mani and he was the assistant director of Aanayum Ambariyum in 1978 film directed by Crossbelt Mani. He made his debut as director through Tiger Salim, released in 1978. His next movie was Moorkhan which was followed by Raktham. He directed Prem Nazir, Srividya in Ithihasam.

Following this, Joshiy directed many films including Kaahalam, Sharam, Karthavyam, Dheera and Aarambham. In 1983, he collaborated with Mammootty for the first time, for Aa Rathri. This was followed by Kodumkattu, came out and a series of films including Bhookambam, Kodathi, Alakadalinakkare, Muhurtham Pathnonnu Muppathinu and Minimol Vathicanil and Sandharbham.

In 1985, Joshiy directed Nirakkoottu, based on the script by debutant Dennis Joseph. Joshiy, Mammootty, and Dennis Joseph continued working together with Nyayavidhi, Shyama and Veendum. He made his debut in Hindi films in 1984 and achieved national fame when he directed Dharm Aur Qanoon starring Rajesh Khanna in a double role along with Dharmendra. It had box office collection of ₹6.5 crores in 1984 and went on to become a hit at the Indian boxoffice.

The films Veendum, Nyayavidhi, Aayiram Kannukal, Sayam Sandhya, Kshamichu Ennoru Vakku followed. In the same year, Joshiy directed New Delhi under Jubilee Productions which was a blockbuster and the highest grossing Malayalam film at the time ( his third Industrial hit ) and was a comeback film for Mammootty. In 1987, he directed Itihaas (1987 film), starring Raaj Kumar in the lead in Hindi, which was remake of Ithihasam. In 1988, Joshiy directed three films, all scripted by Dennis Joseph and Mammootty in the lead role - Dhinarathrangal, Sangham and Thanthram. In 1989, he again teamed with Mohanlal for Naduvazhikal. In 1989, Joshiy brought out a military film. Nair Saab, completely shot in Kashmir, with Mammootty in the title role. Mahayanam, his third film of the year. No.20 Madras Mail was released in 1990 with Mohanlal in lead role, followed by the investigation thriller Ee Thanutha Veluppan Kalathu. Kuttettan was his third film of that year. Joshiy's next film was Kauravar in 1992.

In 1993, Dhruvam got released, followed by Sainyam in 1994. His debut into Telugu cinema was in 1994 through Angarakshugudu, starring Rajashekhar and Meena in leading roles. In 1997 Joshiy brought out Bhoopathi with Suresh Gopi in the lead role. Joshiy joined with Gopi and Renji Panicker for Lelam and Pathram in 1997 and 1999. His next two films were Praja and Dubai in 2001 which performed poorly at the box office. He took a break after these films. In 2004, Joshiy made a comeback with Runway, this time Dileep in the leading role and was followed by Maambazhakkaalam. Naran released in 2005 starring Mohanlal, followed by Lion in 2006.

His next films included Pothan Vava (2006) and July 4 (2007) followed by Nasrani (2007) and Janmam (2007). In 2008 he directed Twenty:20 bringing together almost all Mollywood actors. It was followed by the thriller Robinhood in 2009. Christian Brothers released in 2011, a multi-star film with Mohanlal, Suresh Gopi, Dileep and Sarath Kumar. In 2012, he directed Run Baby Run, another film with Mohanlal in the lead. It was followed by Lokpal in 2013 and Salaam Kashmier 2014 with Jayaram and Suresh Gopi in lead roles. In 2015, Joshiy directed Lailaa O Lailaa. After a four-year hiatus, Joshiy made a comeback with the hit movie Porinju Mariam Jose and also directed the 2022 film Paappan.

== Personal life ==
Joshiy is married to Sindhu. The couple have a son, Abhilash, and a daughter, Aishwarya, who died in a car accident in Chennai in July 2011. Abhilash is married to Varsha. Abhilash made his directorial debut with King of Kotha (2023).

== Filmography ==
Year	Title	Writer
1978	Tiger Salim	S. L. Puram Sadanandan
1980	Moorkhan	Pappanamkodu Lakshmanan
1981	Ithihasam	Pappanamkodu Lakshmanan
1981	Raktham	Kaloor Dennis
1981	Kaahalam	Joshy
1982	Aadarsham	Pappanamkodu Lakshmanan
1982	Aarambham	Pappanamkodu Lakshmanan
1982	Dheera	Pappanamkodu Lakshmanan
1982	Kartavyam	Kaloor Dennis
1982	Sharam	Pappanamkodu Lakshmanan
1983	Angam	Pappanamkodu Lakshmanan
1983	Bhookambam	Priyadarshan
1983	Aa Raathri	Kaloor Dennis
1983	Himam	T. Damodaran
1983	Kodumkattu	Pappanamkodu Lakshmanan
1984	Kodathi	Kaloor Dennis
1984	Minimol Vathicanil	Kaloor Dennis
1984	Sandarbham	Kaloor Dennis
1984	Ivide Ingane	Pappanamkodu Lakshmanan
1984	Alakadalinakkare	Kaloor Dennis
1984	Idavelakku Sesham	Kaloor Dennis
1984	Inakili	John Paul
1984	Piriyilla Naam	Sheriff
1984	Umanilayam	Cochin Haneefa
1984	Dharm Aur Qanoon	B. R. Ishara, Bhushan Banmali
1985	Muhurtham Pathnonnu Muppathinu	Kaloor Dennis
1985	Katha Ithuvare	Kaloor Dennis
1985	Onningu Vannengil	Kaloor Dennis
1985	Iniyum Kadha Thudarum	John Paul
1985	Nirakkoottu	Dennis Joseph
1985	Vannu Kandu Keezhadakki	Dennis Joseph
1985	Oru Kudakeezhil	Dennis Joseph
1986	Shyama	Dennis Joseph
1986	Kshamichu Ennoru Vakku	Kaloor Dennis
1986	Aayiram Kannukal	Dennis Joseph
1986	Nyayavidhi	Dennis Joseph
1986	Veendum	Dennis Joseph
1986	Sayam Sandhya	Dennis Joseph
1987	January Oru Orma	Kaloor Dennis
1987	Itihaas (Hindi film)	Gyandev Agnihotri
1987	New Delhi	Dennis Joseph
1988	Dinarathrangal	Dennis Joseph
1988	Antima Teerpu (Telugu film)	Dennis Joseph
1988	Sangham	Dennis Joseph
1988	Thanthram	Dennis Joseph
1988	New Delhi (Hindi film)	Dennis Joseph
1988	New Delhi (Kannada film)	Dennis Joseph
1989	Naduvazhikal	S. N. Swamy
1989	Nair Saab	Dennis Joseph
1989	Mahayanam	A. K. Lohithadas
1990	No.20 Madras Mail	Dennis Joseph
1990	Kuttettan	A. K. Lohithadas
1990	Ee Thanutha Veluppan Kalathu	P. Padmarajan
1992	Kauravar	A. K. Lohithadas
1993	Dhruvam	S. N. Swamy
1993	Airport (Tamil film)	S. N. Swamy
1994	Angarakshakudu (Telugu film)	S. N. Swamy
1994	Sainyam	S. N. Swamy
1997	Bhoopathi	Dennis Joseph
1997	Lelam	Renji Panicker
1999	Pathram	Renji Panicker
1999	Vazhunnor	Benny P. Nayarambalam
2001	Dubai	Renji Panicker
2001	Praja	Renji Panicker
2004	Runway	Udayakrishna; Siby K. Thomas
2004	Mampazhakkalam	T. A. Shahid
2005	Naran	Ranjan Pramod
2006	Lion	Udayakrishna; Siby K. Thomas
2006	Pothan Vava	Benny P Nayarambalam
2007	July 4	Udayakrishna; Siby K. Thomas
2007	Nasrani	Ranjith
2008	Twenty:20	Udayakrishna; Siby K. Thomas
2009	Robin Hood	Sachi-Sethu
2011	Christian Brothers	Udayakrishna-Siby K. Thomas
2011	Sevenes	Iqbal Kuttippuram
2012	Run Baby Run	Sachy
2013	Lokpal	S. N. Swamy
2014	Salaam Kashmier	Sethu
2014	Avatharam	Vyasan Edavanakad
2015	Lailaa O Lailaa	Suresh Nair
2019	Porinju Mariam Jose	Abhilash N. Chandran
2022	Paappan	RJ Shaan
2023	Antony	Rajesh Varma
TBA	JXUM	Abhilash N. Chandra
