= Tiger Salim =

1978 film directed by Joshiy

- Directed by: Joshiy
- Written by: S. L. Puram Sadanandan
- Screenplay by: S. L. Puram Sadanandan
- Produced by: S. R. Shaji
- Starring: Sudheer, Manjula Vijayakumar, Vincent, Ravikumar, Kaviyoor Ponnamma, Balan K. Nair, Alummoodan
- Cinematography: N. A. Thara
- Music by: Shyam; Lyrics: Bichu Thirumala
- Production company: SR Productions
- Distributed by: SR Productions
- Release date: 22 December 1978
- Country: India
- Language: Malayalam

Tiger Salim is a 1978 Indian Malayalam film, directed by Joshiy in his directorial debut, written by S. L. Puram Sadanandan and produced by S. R. Shaji. The film stars Sudheer, Manjula Vijayakumar, Vincent, Ravi Kumar, etc. in the lead roles. The film has musical score by Shyam.

== Cast ==
- Sudheer as Tiger Salim
- Manjula Vijayakumar
- Vincent
- Ravikumar
- Shubha
- Balan K. Nair

== Soundtrack ==
The music was composed by Shyam and the lyrics were written by Bichu Thirumala.

| No. | Song | Singers | Lyrics | Length (m:ss) |
|---|---|---|---|---|
| 1 | "Chingathennal" | K. J. Yesudas, S. Janaki | Bichu Thirumala | |
| 2 | "Jil Jil Enna Roopam" | S. Janaki | Bichu Thirumala | |
| 3 | "Paambadum Paarayil" | P. Jayachandran, Vani Jairam, Ambili | Bichu Thirumala | |
| 4 | "Roopa Lavanyame" | K. J. Yesudas, S. Janaki | Bichu Thirumala | |
| 5 | "Sankalpangal" | K. J. Yesudas | Bichu Thirumala | |
