= Idavelakku Sesham =

1984 film directed by Joshiy

- Directed by: Joshiy
- Screenplay by: Kaloor Dennis
- Story by: Paul Babu
- Produced by: Thiruppathi Chettiyar
- Starring: Mammootty; Sumalatha; Madhu; Srividya
- Music by: Raveendran
- Production company: Evershine Productions
- Distributed by: Evershine Productions
- Release date: 17 August 1984
- Country: India
- Language: Malayalam

Idavelakku Sesham is a 1984 Indian Malayalam film, directed by Joshiy and produced by Thiruppathi Chettiyar. The film stars Mammootty, Sumalatha, Madhu and Srividya in the lead roles. The film has musical score by Raveendran.

== Cast ==
- Mammootty as Jayadevan IPS
- Sumalatha as Sindhu
- Madhu as Adv. Rajashekaran Nair
- Srividya as Adv. Rajashekaran's wife
- M. G. Soman as Vinodh
- Kalaranjini as Sunitha, Jayadevan's sister
- Adoor Bhasi as Advocate Swami
- Silk Smitha as Dolly
- Sathaar as Vinod's Assistant
- Jagathy Sreekumar
- Jose Prakash
- Santhakumari
- Prathapachandran
- P. K. Abraham as Judge Balagopala Menon

== Plot ==
Advocate Rajashekaran Nair and his wife was leading a happy married life with their children Jayadevan and Sunitha. Jayadevan has completed IPS and Sunitha is in her college days. Sindhu is Jayadevans love. There were loads of happiness pouring into their family as Jayadevan gets his posting in the same city, Sunitha's marriage gets fixed, as well as Jayadevan and Sindhu getting approval for their love.

Worries begin for Rajasekharan Nair as he gets an anonymous call threatening to spoil their happiness in a single moment. Followed by which he receives photographs portraying him and Dolly, a cabaret dancer with their moments spent in a hotel room years ago. The threatener reveals himself as Vinod through phone and blackmails him for money, which he obeys. It is later disclosed that Vinod is the elder brother of Sindhu. Rajasekharan gets further threat calls seeking money and he goes in search of Dolly. Things get complicated when Dolly gets killed by Rajasekharan accidentally in Vinod's residence. Vinod reveals the reason behind his vengeful behaviour. While Rajasekharan was a Public Prosecutor in his initial days, he had vindicated Vinod's father for a murder case of a businessman. Though Vinod's father was innocent, the witness and clues were against him and he was sentenced to imprisonment for 12 years. This initiated revenge in Vinod against Rajsekharan. Vinod and his sister Sindhu were kids at that time, having lost their mother in a very early age. Though Vinod's father is now released, he is bed-ridden.

Vinod gets arrested by the police headed by Jayadevan for murdering Dolly; however Rajasekharan gets him bail. Rajasekharan confesses that, on realising that Vinod's father was innocent, he threw away his job as public prosecutor and had come to meet Vinod's father in jail to submit an appeal, but Vinod's father didn't wish to meet him, and so had to remain in jail for all the years. Things worsen as Jayadevan gets evidence that his father was the murderer of Dolly. Rajasekharan confesses everything to his wife. Jayadevan grants time till Sunitha's marriage, and then Rajasekharan is arrested.

== Soundtrack ==
The music was composed by Raveendran and the lyrics were written by Poovachal Khader.

No.	Song	Singers	Lyrics	Length (m:ss)
1	"Aadyarathi Neelimayil"	K. J. Yesudas	Poovachal Khader	
2	"Kaamuka Nee Varoo"	Vani Jairam, K. P. Brahmanandan	Poovachal Khader	
3	"Maanam Pon Manam"	K. J. Yesudas	Poovachal Khader	
4	"Then Kiniyunna Praayam"	Vani Jairam	Poovachal Khader	
