= Sandarbham =

1984 film directed by Joshiy

- Promotional Poster
- Directed by: Joshiy
- Written by: Cochin Haneefa
- Screenplay by: Kaloor Dennis
- Produced by: Joy Thomas
- Starring: Mammootty; Sukumaran; Saritha; Seema
- Cinematography: Anandakuttan
- Edited by: K. Sankunni
- Music by: Johnson
- Production company: Jubilee Productions
- Distributed by: Jubilee Productions
- Release date: 11 May 1984
- Country: India
- Language: Malayalam

Sandarbham is a 1984 Malayalam film directed by Joshiy, written by Cochin Haneefa, screenplay by Kaloor Dennis, and starring Mammootty, Sukumaran, Saritha, Seema, P. K. Abraham, K. P. A. C. Sunny and Unni Mary.

The film is a typical tear-jerker family-drama tragedy of the 1980s. Films of this genre typically featured a happy family in the beginning, with a well placed husband-cum-father, a young mother and a girl child of the age of 3 or 4. In the end, the family gets into a whirlpool of relationship problems. The film was remade in Tamil as Paadatha Thenikkal.

== Cast ==
- Baby Shalini as Ravi's daughter
- Saritha as Dr.Indhu
- Mammootty as Ravi
- KPAC Sunny
- P. K. Abraham
- Vazhoor Rajan
- Seema as Mary
- M. G. Soman
- Sukumaran
- Prathapachandran
- Cochin Haneefa
- Rohini
- Nellikode Bhaskaran

== Release ==
The film was released on 11 May 1984.

=== Box office ===
The film was both commercial and critical success.

== Soundtrack ==
The music was composed by Johnson and the lyrics were written by Poovachal Khader.

No.	Song	Singers	Lyrics	Length (m:ss)
1	"Doctor Saare"	K. J. Yesudas	Poovachal Khader	
2	"Pandoru Kaattiloraansimham"	P. Susheela	Poovachal Khader	
3	"Pandoru Kaattiloraansimham" (Pathos)	K. J. Yesudas	Poovachal Khader	
4	"Thrailokyapaalane"	Vani Jairam, K. P. Brahmanandan	Poovachal Khader	
