= Gayathri Ashokan =

Indian poster designer and screenwriter

- Born: B. Ashok; 6 April 1957 (age 69); Ettumanoor India
- Other name: Gayatri Ashokan
- Occupations: Film poster designer, screenwriter
- Years active: 1983–present
- Spouse: Girija Ashok
- Children: Vinayak Ashok (Son); Raja Rajeswari (Daughter)

Gayathri Ashokan is an Indian poster designer and screenwriter who works in Malayalam cinema. He is considered as a pioneer in poster designing art along with P. N. Menon in Malayalam film industry. His debut design was for director Padmarajan' s Koodevide where he created a poster with all characters appearing in postage stamp. The posters created a very good impact among filmgoers. He has designed promotional posters for over 700 films including Tamil films. Ashokan introduced the airbrush concept in Malayalam posters.

== Career ==
Ashokan started off his career as a designer for books and magazines based at Kottayam and he later started doing posters in the name of the studio he worked. The posters of most of the films produced and distributed by Jubilee Pictures, Geo Movies, Binny Films, Central Pictures and Century Films were designed by Ashokan, on behalf of the Studio. He has also worked as a lay out designer for Cut-Cut Magazine, published from Kottayam.

His first break as an independent poster designer happened with Koodevide, followed by Swanthamevide Bandhamevide, Sandarbham, Ente Upasana and finally his 10th film My Dear Kuttichathan. Eight of those ten films became a success at the box office establishing Ashokan as a prominent designer.

Gayathri Ashokan's work for Devaraagam, Kala Pani and Thazhvaram was much appreciated. He is also the screenwriter for the Mohanlal starrer action thriller Douthyam, released in 1989. He also wrote the screenplay of Itha Samayamayi, but was uncredited.

== Selected filmography ==
- Kalikkalam
- Koodevide
- Parannu Parannu Parannu
- Sandarbham
- Swanthamevide Bandhamevide
- Vannu Kandu Keezhadakki
- Oru Nokku Kaanan
- Muthaaramkunnu P.O
- Nirakkoottu
- Namukku Paarkkaan Munthirithoppukal
- Snehamulla Simham
- Ee Kaikalil
- Chidambaram
- Kariyilakkaattu Pole
- Onnu Muthal Poojyam Vare
- Shyama
- Anantharam
- Kadhaykku Pinnil
- 1921
- Kudumbapuraanam
- Sangham
- Devaraagam
- Kala Pani
- Thazhvaram
- My Dear Kuttichathan
- Douthyam
- Vellanakalude Nadu
- New Delhi
- Mathilukal
- Thaniyavarthanam
- Irupatham Noottandu
- Oru CBI Diary kurippu
- Dinaraathrangal
- Moonnaam Mura
- Mrigaya
- Vandanam
- Chithram
- Utharam
- Kireedam
- Paadha Mudra
- Varavelpu
- Manu Uncle
- Ponmuttayidunna Thaaravu
- Sargam
- Samrajyam
- Thenmavin Kombath
- Chandralekha
- His Highness Abdulla
- Aaraam Thamburan
- FIR
- Kilukkam
