= K. Sankunni =

Indian film editor

- Born: 1940 or 1941
- Died: 28 February 2001 (age 60)
- Occupation: editor
- Spouse: Indira Sankunni
- Children: 4

K. Sankunni was an Indian film editor who worked predominantly in Malayalam film industry. He has edited around 300 films. He edited mostly Malayalam films and also has some credits in Tamil, Telugu, Kannada, and Hindi films. Sankunni won the Kerala State Film Award for Best Editor in 1988.

== Filmography ==
| Year | Film |
|---|---|
| 1966 | Tharavattamma |
| 1967 | Pareeksha |
| 1968 | Manaswini |
| 1969 | Kaattukurangu |
| 1969 | Mooladhanam |
| 1970 | Rakthapushpam |
| 1971 | Vilaykku Vaangiya Veena |
| 1971 | Vithukal |
| 1971 | Yogamullaval |
| 1971 | Bobanum Moliyum |
| 1971 | Lankaadahanam |
| 1972 | Pushpaanjali |
| 1972 | Sambhavaami Yuge Yuge |
| 1972 | Azhimukham |
| 1972 | Aaradimanninte Janmi |
| 1972 | Brahmachaari |
| 1973 | Ajnaathavasam |
| 1973 | Pachanottukal |
| 1973 | Udayam |
| 1973 | Thiruvaabharanam- |
| 1973 | Interview |
| 1973 | Veendum Prabhaatham |
| 1973 | Raakkuyil |
| 1974 | Ashwathi |
| 1974 | Sethubandhanam |
| 1974 | Honeymoon |
| 1974 | Shaapamoksham |
| 1974 | Oru Pidi Ari |
| 1974 | Arakkallan Mukkaalkkallan |
| 1974 | Nagaram Saagaram |
| 1974 | Thacholi Marumakan Chanthu |
| 1974 | Night Duty |
| 1974 | Panchathanthram |
| 1974 | Vrindaavanam |
| 1975 | Sindhu |
| 1975 | Ullaasayaathra |
| 1975 | Mattoru Seetha |
| 1975 | Chattambikkalyaani |
| 1975 | Paalazhi Madhanam |
| 1975 | Thiruvonam |
| 1975 | Ashtamirohini |
| 1975 | Omanakkunju |
| 1975 | Sammaanam |
| 1975 | Pravaaham |
| 1976 | Agnipushpam |
| 1976 | Ajayanum Vijayanum |
| 1976 | Kaamadhenu |
| 1976 | Paarijaatham |
| 1976 | Chirikkudukka |
| 1976 | Kaayamkulam Kochunniyude Makan |
| 1976 | Mohiniyaattam |
| 1976 | Appooppan (Charithram Aavarthikkunnilla) |
| 1976 | Pushpasharam |
| 1976 | Amma |
| 1977 | Ammaayi Amma |
| 1977 | Muttathe Mulla |
| 1977 | Nirakudam |
| 1977 | Chathurvedam |
| 1977 | Sreedevi |
| 1977 | Akshayapaathram |
| 1977 | Sankhupushpam |
| 1977 | Ashtamangalyam |
| 1977 | Sukradasa |
| 1977 | Lakshmi |
| 1977 | Shaantha oru Devatha |
| 1977 | Harshabaashpam |
| 1977 | Jagadguru Adisankaran |
| 1977 | Sooryakanthi |
| 1977 | Parivarthanam |
| 1977 | Panchaamritham |
| 1978 | Ninakku Njaanum Enikku Neeyum |
| 1978 | Premashilpi |
| 1978 | Balapareekshanam |
| 1978 | Etho Oru Swapnam |
| 1978 | Aanakkalari |
| 1978 | Mukkuvane Snehicha Bhootham |
| 1978 | Mattoru Karnan |
| 1978 | Midukkipponnamma |
| 1978 | Kalpavriksham |
| 1978 | Nivedyam |
| 1978 | Manoradham |
| 1978 | Chakraayudham |
| 1978 | Lisa |
| 1978 | Kanyaka |
| 1978 | Kaathirunna Nimisham |
| 1978 | Jayikkaanaay Janichavan |
| 1978 | Society Lady |
| 1978 | Mudramothiram |
| 1978 | Maattoly |
| 1978 | Bhaaryayum Kaamukiyum |
| 1979 | Avano Atho Avalo |
| 1979 | Yakshippaaru |
| 1979 | Kaayalum Kayarum |
| 1979 | Nakshathrangale Sakshi |
| 1979 | Kallu Kaarthyaayani |
| 1979 | Sukhathinte Pinnale |
| 1979 | Pichaathikkuttappan |
| 1979 | Kazhukan |
| 1979 | Pennorumbettaal |
| 1979 | Anupallavi |
| 1979 | Aval Niraparaadhi |
| 1979 | Tharangam |
| 1979 | Driver Madyapichirunnu |
| 1979 | Lajjaavathi |
| 1979 | Kannukal |
| 1979 | Sarppam |
| 1981 | Needhi Pizhaithathu |
| 1987 | New Delhi |
| 1989 | Mahayanam |
| 1990 | Appu |
| 1990 | Ee Thanutha Veluppan Kalathu |
| 1993 | Uppukandam Brothers |
| 1999 | Pathram |
