= Kaloor Dennis =

Malayalam film scriptwriter

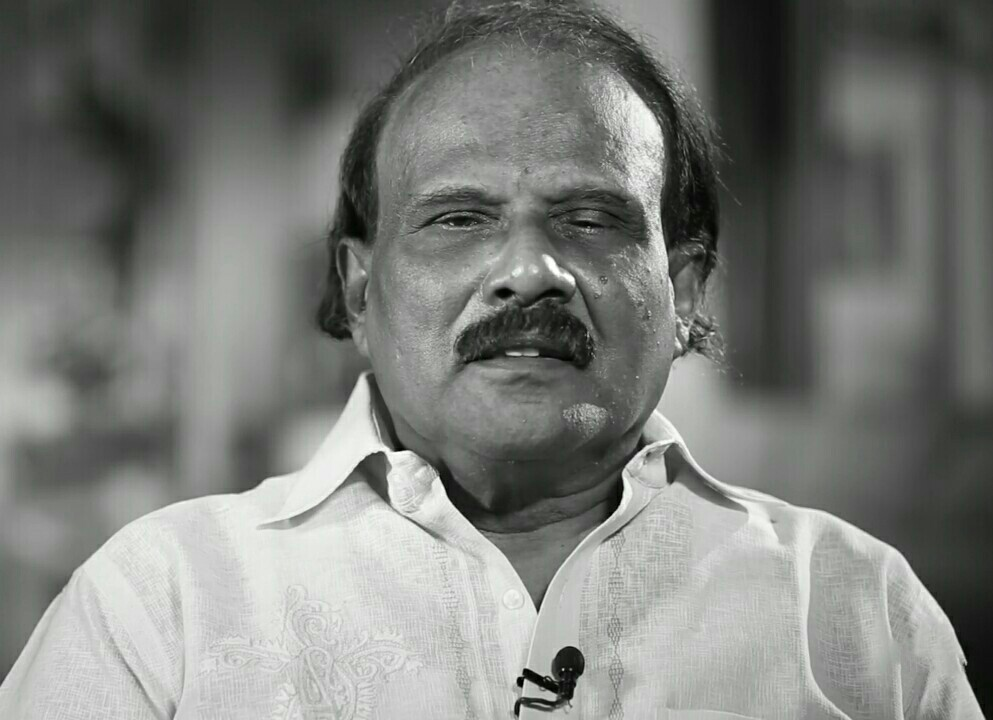
- In Charithram Enniloode
- Occupation: script writer
- Years active: 1979-present
- Spouse: Seena Dennis
- Children: Dinu Dennis; Deeno Dennis

Kaloor Dennis is an Indian film scriptwriter and novelist. He works predominantly in Malayalam cinema. He started his career with Anubhavangale Nandi in 1979. He worked in more than 100 Malayalam movies with the areas of his contribution including script, story and dialogue. Popular movies scripted by him are Raktham (1981), Aa Rathri (1983), Sandarbam (1984), January Oru Orma (1986), Gajakesariyogam (1990), Mimics Parade (1991), Welcome to Kodaikanal (1992), Kudumbasametham (1992) and Paithrukam (1993). He won the 1992 Kerala State Film Award for Best Screenplay for Kudumbasametham His son Dinu Dennis has acted in the films Ottananayam (2005) and Ennitum (2006).

== Career ==
It was the script that he penned for Joshiy's movie Raktham that made him popular as a writer. Dennis' association with the Malayalam film industry started in the mid 1970s when he and designer Kitho started a cinema magazine, Chitrapournami. This gave them the opportunity to interact with several top-line actors and directors. Dennis' first script was for the movie Vayal directed by Antony Eastman. Soman and Shubha played the lead roles. At that time Jagan Pictures Appachan was planning for a new movie after Chamaram. Appachan read Dennis' novel Aakashathinu Keezhe published in Chitrakaumudi weekly and expressed his interest to make a movie based on that novel.

Accordingly, Dennis completed the script. They had not finalised the actor and that Friday a new film, Moorkhan, was released at Ernakulam Padma. Appachan and Dennis went for the movie. The movie was racy and thrilling and during the interval, Appachan asked Dennis. "Why cant we approach this young man Varkkala Joshiy to direct 'Aakashathinu Keezhe'?" Joshiy was finalised. They hired two of the lead actors Prem Nazir and Madhu for the movie.

However, at the last minute, some problems arose regarding the location, and Appachan asked Dennis to find another story. But Dennis came up with a new subject the very next day. After penning the script, the movie was titled Raktham.

"Raktham was the inaugural movie of Mymoon theatre. It had a successful hundred plus days run," remembers Dennis.

Kaloor Dennis is known as a scriptwriter standing along with the producer. As a result of this, Dennis often had a clash with the superstars. Mammootty, who acted as a hero in 24 of his films, had not been on speaking terms with Dennis for over 12 years. There were differences of opinion with Suresh Gopi also. The beginning of Malayalam Cine Technicians Association (MACTA) was in fact formed as a backdrop of this rift with Suresh Gopi.

He is always of the opinion that producers should be respected and loved then and now. The intervention of actors cannot be accepted. The issue with Suresh Gopi which eventually led to the formation of MACTA started on the location of a movie named City Police scripted by him. The shooting of the film went on smoothly. Suresh Gopi was the hero of his next film Karpuradeepam also. There were differences of opinion on the location. Shooting was disrupted and the producer was in a crisis. He soon called Joshiy and thought of forming an organisation for scriptwriters. Joshiy directed to include directors also. The first executive meet of MACTA was held at Bharat Tourist Home. It grew into a big cultural organization. MACTA was formed against Suresh Gopi. But Suresh Gopi started giving donation for it from the day it was formed. Their conflict lasted only for six months. Along with John Paul, Dennis went to the shooting location of Joshiy's film Bhupathi. Suresh Gopi was the hero of the film. When Suresh Gopi heard Dennis talking to Joshiy about convening MACTA's committee, he insisted that the committee of MACTA be convened in his house ! He also served a sumptuous sadya for everyone. After that, Suresh Gopi had acted in four to five films of Kaloor Dennis including Marc Antony and Paranju Theeratha Visheshangal

== Awards ==
- 1992 Kerala State Film Award for Best Screenplay for Kudumbasammedam

== Partial filmography ==
Year	Films	Story	Screenplay	Dialogue	Director	Notes
1979	Anubhavangale Nanni	check			I. V. Sasi	
1979	Ivide Kattinu Sugandam	check			P. G. Viswambharan	
1980	Akalangalil Abhayam	check			Jeassy	
1981	Vayal	check	check	check	Antony Eastman	
1981	Raktham	check	check	check	Joshiy	
1981	Sambhavam		check	check	P. Chandrakumar	
1981	Thaaraavu			check	Jeassy	
1982	Aa Raathri	check	check	check	Joshiy	
1982	Karthavyam	check	check	check	Joshiy	
1982	Oru Vilippaadakale	check	check	check	Jeassy	
1982	Aayudham	check	check	check	P. Chandrakumar	
1983	Prathijnja			check	P. N. Sundaram	
1984	Kodathy		check	check	Joshiy	
1984	Sandarbham		check	check	Joshiy	
1984	Idavelakku Sesham		check	check	Joshiy	
1984	Koottinilamkili		check		Sajan	
1984	Alakadalinakkare		check	check	Joshiy	
1984	Minimol Vathicanil		check		Joshiy	
1985	Upaharam		check	check	Sajan	
1986	Malarum Kiliyum		check	check	K. Madhu	
1986	Oppam Oppathinoppam		check	check	Soman	
1987	January Oru Orma		check	check	Joshiy	
1987	Ivide Ellavarkum Sukham		check	check	Jeassy	
1988	Arjun Dennis	check	check	check	Thevalakkara Chellappan	
1988	Unnikrishnante Adyathe Christmas		check	check	Kamal	Co-written with John Paul
1990	Marupuram		check	check	Viji Thampi	Co-written with Renjith
1990	Gajakesariyogam		check	check	P. G. Viswambharan	
1990	Thoovalsparsham		check	check	Kamal	
1991	Innathe Program		check	check	P. G. Viswambharan	
1991	Irikku M.D. Akathundu		check	check	P. G. Viswambharan	
1991	Mimics Parade		check	check	Thulasidas	
1991	Koodikazhcha		check	check	T. S. Suresh Babu	
1991	Nagarathil Samsara Vishayam		check	check	Prashanth	
1992	Kudumbasametham		check	check	Jayaraj	
1992	Kunukkitta Kozhi	check	check	check	Viji Thampi	
1992	Kallan Kappalil Thanne		check	check	Prashanth	
1992	Kasarkode Khaderbai		check	check	Thulasidas	
1992	Welcome to Kodaikanal		check	check	Anil Babu	
1992	Thiruthalvaadi		check	check	Viji Thampi	
1992	Manthrikacheppu	check	check	check	Anil Babu	
1992	First Bell		check	check	P. G. Vishwambharan	
1992	Priyapetta Kukku		check	check	Sunil	
1992	Congratulations Miss Anitha Menon		check	check	Thulasidas	
1993	Paithrukam		check	check	Jayaraj	
1993	Injakkadan Mathai & Sons	check	check	check	Anil Babu	
1993	Sakshal Sreeman Chathunni	check	check	check	Anil Babu	
1993	Uppukandam Brothers		check	check	T. S. Suresh Babu	
1993	Sowbhagyam		check	check	Sandhya Mohan	
1993	Sthreedhanam		check	check	Anil Babu	
1993	Journalist		check	check	Viji Thampi	
1994	Vendor Daniel State Licency		check	check	Balu Kiriyath	
1994	Kambolam	check	check	check	Baiju Kottarakara	
1994	Kadal		check	check	Siddique Shameer	
1994	Bharya		check	check	VR Gopalakrishnan	
1995	Street	check	check	check	Anil–Babu	
1995	Kalyanji Anandji		check	check	Balu Kiriyath	
1995	Thumboli Kadappuram		check	check	Jayaraj	
1995	Kalamasseriyil Kalyanayogam		check	check	Balu Kiriyath	
1996	Manthrika Kuthira		check	check	Viji Thampi	
1996	Sulthan Hydarali		check	check	Balu Kiriyath	
1996	King Solaman		check	check	Balu Kiriyath	
1997	Killikurissiyile Kudumbamela		check	check	Viji Thampi	
1997	Gajaraja Manthram		check	check	Thaha	
1997	Anjarakalyanam		check	check	V. M. Vinu	
1999	Ezhupunna Tharakan	check	check	check	P. G. Vishwambharan	
2000	Mark Antony		check	check	T. S. Suresh Babu	
2002	Oomappenninu Uriyadappayyan		check	check	Vinayan	
2004	Kerala House Udan Vilpanakku		check	check	Thaha	
2005	Krithyam		check	check	Viji Thampi	
2007	Paranju Theeratha Visheshangal		check	check	Harikumar	
2009	Decent Parties		check	check	Abraham Lincoln	
2010	Again Kasargod Khader Bhai		check	check	Thulasidas	
2010	9 KK Road		check	check	Simon Kuruvila	
2013	Climax		check	check	Anil	
