= Jagadish filmography =

Indian actor

P. V. Jagadish Kumar, known as Jagadish, is an Indian actor, screenwriter, and television presenter. He has starred in over 400 Malayalam films.

== Actor ==
=== 1980s ===
Year	Title	Role	Notes
1984	My Dear Kuttichathan	Cabaret Announcer	
1984	Odaruthammava Aalariyam	Kora	
1985	Oru Naal Innoru Naal		
1985	Mutharamkunnu P.O.	Vasu	
1985	Akkare Ninnoru Maran	Vishwan	
1986	Ponnum Kudathinu Pottu	College Student	
1986	Mazha Peyunnu Madalam Kottunnu	Sub-Inspector of Police	
1986	Love Story	Hameed	
1986	Nandi Veendum Varika		
1987	Veendum Lisa		
1987	Irupatham Noottandu	Balakrishnan	
1987	Bhoomiyile Rajakkanmar	Babu	
1987	Sarvakalashala	Najeeb	
1987	Ayitham		
1987	Jaalakam	Kuzhuveli	
1987	Manivathoorile Aayiram Sivarathrikal	Neena's Cousin	
1988	Sanghunadam	SI Rajappan Achari	
1988	Witness	Podiyan	
1988	Vellanakalude Naadu	Kumaran	
1988	Samvalsarangal		
1988	Oozham		
1988	Sangham	Palunni	
1988	August 1	Martin Varghese	
1988	Oru Muthassi Katha	Thankappan	
1988	Orkkappurathu	Producer	
1988	Chithram	Jayan	
1989	Varavelpu	Valsan	
1989	Vandanam	ASI Puroshotaman Nair	
1989	Peruvannapurathe Visheshangal	Balan	
1989	Kandathum Kettathum	Varghese	
1989	News	Chandu	
1989	Kireedam	Suresh	
1989	Vadakkunokkiyantram	Vinod Kumar Alleppey	
1989	Pooram		
1989	Swagatham	Hirosh	
1989	Chanakyan	Tea Shop Owner	
1989	Adikkurippu	Bappootty	

=== 1990s ===
Year	Title	Role	Notes
1990	Shubhayathra	Rajendran	
1990	Abhimanyu	Manikandon	
1990	Aye Auto	Sreekrishnan	
1990	Thalayana Manthram	Bhasurachandran	Cameo appearance
1990	Minda Poochakku Kalyanam		
1990	Pavam Pavam Rajakumaran	Sujanapalan	
1990	Kadathanadan Ambadi	Brahmin	
1990	Subhayathra	Rajendran	
1990	Superstar	Kuttappan Thampuran	
1990	Vidhyarambham	Natarajan	
1990	Saandram	Markosekutty	
1990	Malayogom	Gangadharan	
1990	In Harihar Nagar	Appukuttan	
1990	His Highness Abdullah	Gupthan Thampuran	
1990	Gajakesariyogam	Parasuraman	
1990	Ee Kanni Koodi	Mani	
1990	Dr. Pasupathy	Society Balan	
1990	Akkare Akkare Akkare	Peter	
1990	No.20 Madras Mail	Hari	
1990	Kuttettan	Gopalakrishnan	
1991	Sundhari Kakka	Thomson	
1991	Nayam Vyakthamakkunnu	Kurudimannil Sasi	
1991	Mookilla Rajyathu	Police Inspector	
1991	Post Box No. 27		
1991	Agni Nilavu	Sekharankutty	
1991	Kalari		
1991	Apoorvam Chilar	Subhramaniam	
1991	Marathon		
1991	Irikku M.D. Akathundu	John	
1991	Amina Tailors	Manjeri Majeed	
1991	Parallel College	Vasu	
1991	Nettippattam	Jocky	
1991	Ennum Nanmakal	Ulpalakshan	
1991	Nagarathil Samsara Vishayam	Gopinatha Menon	
1991	Kadinjool Kalyanam	Anthony D'Silva	
1991	Mukha Chithram	M. K. Pushkaran	
1991	Mimics Parade	Unni	
1991	Vishnulokam	Tharakan	
1991	Kizhakkunarum Pakshi	Anandhu's Friend	
1991	Koodikazhcha	Skariya	
1991	Godfather	Mayeenkutty	
1991	Georgootty C/O Georgootty	Cheerankandathu Anto	
1991	Ganamela	Mukundan	
1991	Cheppu Kilukkana Changathi	Krishnankutty	
1991	Kilukkam	Photographer	Cameo appearance
1991	Abhimanyu	Manikandan	
1991	Inspector Balram	Sudhakaran	
1992	Welcome to Kodaikanal	James Kutty	
1992	Thiruthalvaadi	Krishnankutty	
1992	Thalastaanam	Siddharth	
1992	Priyapetta Kukku		
1992	Mr & Mrs		
1992	Ponnaramthottathe Raajaavu	Unnikrishna Menon	
1992	Pandu Pandoru Rajakumari	Appukuttan Pillai	
1992	Oru Kochu Bhoomikulukkam	Constable Purushothaman	
1992	Mughamudra	Varghese Valavil	
1992	Manyanmaar	CI Vincent D'Souza	
1992	Makkal Mahatmyam	Manikantan	
1992	Manthrikacheppu	Raju	
1992	Kunukkitta Kozhi	Unnikrishnan	
1992	Aardram		
1992	Kingini		
1992	Kasarkode Khaderbai	Unni	
1992	Kallan Kappalil Thanne	Appavi Appukuttan/Ananthan Gurukkal	
1992	Gruhapravesam	Kannan	
1992	First Bell	Pindimala Paulraj	
1992	Congratulations Miss Anitha Menon	Police Inspector Rajan	
1993	Addeham Enna Iddeham	Josy Perera	
1993	Vakkeel Vasudev	Adv.Vasudev	
1993	Uppukandam Brothers	Uppukandam Josekutty	
1993	Sthreedhanam	Shanthan	
1993	Sthalathe Pradhana Payyans	Gopalakrishnan	
1993	Sakshal Sreeman Chathunni	Unnikrishnan	
1993	Sowbhagyam	Balachandran	
1993	Naaraayam		
1993	Journalist	Unnikrishnan	
1993	Jackpot	David	
1993	Janam	Harikrishnan	
1993	Injakkadan Mathai & Sons	Roy	
1993	Butterflies	Vettikkal Sadashivan	
1993	Paalayam	Mani	
1994	Vendor Daniel State Licency	Adv. Balagopalan Menon	
1994	Bhaagyavaan		
1994	Sainyam		
1994	Santhanagopalam	Vinayachandran	
1994	Pavam I.A. Ivachan	Harischandran	
1994	Njan Kodiswaran	Gopi	
1994	Kudumba Vishesham	Chinna Thampy	
1994	Pradakshinam		
1994	Bharya		
1995	Chaithanyam		
1995	Thakshashila	Charlie	
1995	Simhavalan Menon	Hariprasad / Giriprasad	
1995	Prayikkara Pappan	Shivan	
1995	Nirnnayam	Dr. V. D. Iyer	
1995	Minnaminuginum Minnukettu	Unni	
1995	Avittam Thirunaal Aarogya Sriman	Sahadevan	
1995	Maanthrikam	Jobi D'Costa / Subedar Teddy Lopez	
1995	Agnidevan	Murukan	
1996	Tom & Jerry	Kuttikrishnan	
1996	Kireedamillatha Rajakkanmar	Shankar	
1996	Kinnam Katta Kallan	Sub Inspector V.C. Bhagyanathan	
1996	Kathapurushan	Thomas Tharakan	
1996	Kumkumacheppu	Mani	
1996	Soorya Puthrikal		
1996	Mimics Super 1000	Balakrishnan	
1996	Kalyana Sowgandhikam	Premadasan	
1996	Kaliveedu	Ulahannan	
1996	Kaathil Oru Kinnaram	Hari	
1996	Hitler	Hrudayabhanu	
1996	Azhakiya Ravanan	Himself	
1997	Superman	SI Balachandran	
1997	Krishnagudiyil Oru Pranayakalathu	George Abraham	
1997	My Dear Kuttichathan Part 2		
1997	Junior Mandrake	Pradeep Nambiar	
1997	Moonu Kodiyum Munnooru Pavanum		
1997	Kilikurissiyile Kudumbamela	Thommikunju	
1997	Raajathanthram		
1997	Nagarapuraanam	Manikuttan	
1997	Anubhoothi	Appukuttan Nair	
1997	Ishtadanam	Ananthakrishnan Thambi	
1997	Gajaraja Manthram	Anantha Padmanabhan	
1997	Five Star Hospital	Adipoli Aymooti	
1997	Arjunan Pillayum Anchu Makkalum	Uthaman	
1997	Ancharakalyanam	Unnikrishnan Panicker	
1997	Varnapakittu	Pylee	
1998	Nakshatratharattu	M. K. Swaminathan	
1998	Malabar Ninnoru Manimaaran		
1998	British Market		
1998	Sreekrishnapurathe Nakshathrathilakkam	SI 'Idivettu' Indrajith	
1998	Sooryaputhran	Shatrughnan	
1998	Sidhartha	Pavithran Sidharthan's assistant	
1998	Manthrikumaran	Ramanan	
1998	Mangalya Pallakku	Govindankutty	
1998	Aalibabayum Aarara Kallanmarum		
1998	Achaammakkuttiyude Achaayan	Kattungal Johnny	
1998	Kudumba Vaarthakal	Devadas	
1998	Harikrishnans	Public Prosecutor	
1998	Gramapanchayath	Chakrapani	
1998	Ayal Kadha Ezhuthukayanu	Sainuddin	
1999	Ezhupunna Tharakan	Muhammad Ali	
1999	Deepasthambham Mahascharyam	Susheelan	
1999	Chandranudikkunna Dikkil	Sasi	
1999	Auto Brothers	Babu	
1999	Pallavur Devanarayanan	Kumaran	
1999	Swastham Grihabharanam	Appu	
1999	Stalin Sivadas	Vishwam	
1999	Aayiram Meni	Abdutty	
1999	Aakasha Ganga	Krishnan Thampuran	
1999	Thennali Raman		
1999	Sparsham	Shivadasan	

=== 2000s ===
Year	Title	Role	Notes
2000	Summer Palace	Mega Bhagyaraj Andipallikavu	
2000	Ee Mazha Then Mazha	Chakkochen	
2000	Sahayathrikakku Snehapoorvam		
2000	Mimics 2000		
2000	Aanamuttathe Aangalamar	Rajeevan	
2000	Vinayapoorvam Vidhyaadharan	Alex Paul	
2000	Dreams	Servant	
2000	The Gang		
2000	The Warrant	Thomas Kora	
2000	Devadoothan	Ithakk	
2000	Sathyam Sivam Sundaram	Pankajakshan	
2000	Ingane Oru Nilapakshi	Adiyodi	
2001	Ennum Sambhavami Yuge Yuge		
2001	Unnathangalil	Seban	
2001	Mutholakottaram		
2001	Bhadra	Jayadevan	
2001	Kakkakuyil	Tyootty	
2001	Sharjah to Sharjah	Kuwait Kochunni	
2001	Raavanaprabhu	Guruswamy	
2001	House Owner		
2001	Nariman	Gopi Pillai	
2001	Bharthavudyogam	Unnikrishnan Namboothiri	
2002	India Gate	CI Mohandas	
2002	Kakki Nakshatram	Balan	
2002	Kalachakram		
2002	Aabharanacharthu		
2002	Grand Mother		
2002	Nandanam	Elder son of Sankaran Moosari	
2002	Onnaman	Krishnankutty	
2002	Thandavam	Murugan	
2002	Oomappenninu Uriyadappayyan	Karunan	
2002	Jagathi Jagathish in Town	Unnikrishnan, Jagadish	
2002	Puthooramputhri Unniyarcha	Kunjamarar	
2002	Chirikkudukka	Sumukhan	
2002	Chathurangam	Mathen Chethimattom	
2002	Videsi Nair Swadesi Nair	Vindhyan	
2003	Thilakkam	Venu	
2003	Saudhamini		
2003	The Fire	Salim	
2003	Vasanthamalika	Madhavan	
2003	Thillana Thillana	K. P. Omanakuttan	
2003	Sahodharan Sahadevan	Appukuttan	
2003	Mr. Brahmachari	Rajappan	
2003	War and Love	Hav. Kurian	
2003	Koodariyaathe		
2003	Hariharan Pilla Happy Aanu	SI Vinod Kumar	
2003	Hungama	Pandu Rajan	Hindi debut film
2003	Chithrakoodam	Bhaskaran	
2004	Kottaram Vaidyan	Sukumaran	
2004	Koottu	Xavier	
2004	Maniyarakkallan		
2004	Vamanapuram Bus Route	Kumaran	
2004	Sethurama Iyer CBI	Tailor Mani	
2004	KakkaKarumban		
2004	Symphony	Manoharan	
2004	Vellinakshathram	Kochuraman	
2004	Jalolsavam	Soman	
2004	Govindankutty Thirakkilanu	Thomaskutty	
2004	Vettam	Hotel Waiter Sugunan	
2005	Junior Senior	Balagangadharan	
2005	Athbhutha Dweepu	Joseph	
2005	Chandrolsavam	Kuttiraman	
2005	Kalyana Kurimanam	Madhavan	
2005	Boyy Friennd	Vigneshwaran	
2006	Baalyam		
2006	Pakal	Ummachan	
2006	Vaasthavam	Shibhu Vattappara	
2006	Aanachandam	Santhosh	
2006	Narakasuran	Vasu	
2006	Mahasamudram	Hamsa	
2006	Balram vs. Tharadas	ASI Sudhakaran	
2006	Bhargavacharitham Moonam Khandam	Velayudhan	
2007	Black Cat	Vakkachan	
2007	Payum Puli	SI Sreenivasan	
2007	Paradesi		
2007	Hallo	Adv. Thomas Jacob	
2007	Naalu Pennungal		
2007	Ali Bhai	Kallankari Dasappan	
2007	Katha Parayumpol	Sarasan	
2007	Flash		
2008	Oru Pennum Randaanum	Advocate	
2008	Kaalchilambu		
2008	Anthiponvettam		
2008	Cycle		
2008	One Way Ticket	Salahudeen	
2008	Sanmanassullavan Appukuttan	Sugunan	
2008	Gulmohar	Samuel	
2008	Twenty:20	Police Constable Nakulan	
2009	Orkkuka Vallappozhum		
2009	Billu Barber	'Modern' Madan	Hindi film
2009	Samastha Keralam PO	Chandy	
2009	Kancheepurathe Kalyanam	C.M. Premachandran	
2009	Decent Parties	Sudheendran	
2009	Paribhavam		
2009	Red Chillies	Surendran	
2009	Seetha Kalyanam	Thampi	
2009	Puthiya Mukham	Harishankar	
2009	Mayoori		
2009	2 Harihar Nagar	Appukuttan	
2009	Kappal Muthalaali	Thulasidharan	
2009	Pazhassi Raja	Bhandari	

=== 2010s ===
Year	Title	Role	Notes
2010	Senior Mandrake	Pradeep	
2010	In Ghost House Inn	Appukuttan	
2010	April Fool	C. R. Krishnanunni / Unni	
2010	Cheriya Kallanum Valiya Policum	K P Kumaran	
2010	Advocate Lakshmanan – Ladies Only	Degree Govindan	
2010	Paattinte Palazhy		
2010	Karayilekku Oru Kadal Dooram	Doctor	
2010	Sakudumbam Shyamala	Subram	
2010	Fiddle		
2010	Thoovalkattu	Vanduran	
2010	Vandae Maatharam	Sheshadri	Bilingual film; also shot in Tamil
2010	Alexander the Great	Sree Ramakrishnan	
2010	T. D. Dasan Std. VI B	Madhavan	
2010	Again Kasargod Khader Bhai	Unni	
2011	Sarkar Colony	Lambodharan	
2011	Makeup Man	Adv. Mathai	
2011	Nadakame Ulakam	Pappan	
2011	Ithu Nammude Katha	Satheesh	
2011	City of God	C.I. Pavamani	
2011	Manikyakkallu	Vasudevan Cheruvancherry a.k.a. V.D.C	
2011	Kottarathil Kutty Bhootham		
2011	Lucky Jokers	Pisharadi	
2011	Uppukandam Brothers Back in Action	Josekutty / Joy	
2011	Theja Bhai and Family	Govindan Nair	
2011	Bombay Mittayi		
2012	Red Alert		
2012	Kochi	Vishwanathan	
2012	No. 66 Madhura Bus	Police Officer	
2012	Pulival Pattanam		
2012	Kunjaliyan	Sukumaran	
2012	Achante Aanmakkal	Nandagopan	
2012	Ozhimuri	Madhupal	
2013	Players (film)		
2013	Pakaram		
2013	White Paper	Asokan	
2013	Rose Guitarinaal	Thara's father	
2013	Lisammayude Veedu	Utthaman	
2013	Left Right Left	S.I. Raju	
2013	One	Team Leader	
2013	At Once		
2013	Kadal Kadannu Oru Mathukkutty	Himself	
2013	Ginger	Sethumadhavan	
2013	Malayala Nadu		
2013	Parankimala		
2013	On The Way		
2013	Color Balloon	'Member' Panikkar	
2014	One Day Jokes		
2014	Mazhayariyaathe		
2014	Maayaapuri 3D		
2014	Education Loan		
2014	Christmas Cake		
2014	Nayana	Balan	
2014	Gamer		
2014	Jalamsham	Kunjukunju	
2015	Female Unnikrishnan		
2015	Rasam	Abdhu	
2015	Buddhanum Chaplinum Chirikkunnu		
2015	John Honai	Banker Vasudeva Kammath	
2015	Two Countries	Ujwal	
2016	Leela	Thankappan Nair	
2016	Kasaba	S. I. Mukundan	
2016	Karinkunnam 6's	Narayanan, Commentator	
2017	C/O Saira Banu	Advocate	
2018	Shirk		
2019	Swapnarajyam	Sumesh	

=== 2020s ===
Year	Title	Role	Notes
2021	One	P. Sugunan	
2021	The Priest	Adv. Sadasivam K A	
2021	Bhramam	Dr. Swamy	
2021	Madhuram	Kevin's father	
2022	Bro Daddy	Dr. Samuel Mathew	
2022	Pada	P. Krishnakumar I.A.S.	
2022	Thattukada Muthal Semitheri Vare	Mathews	
2022	Head Master		
2022	Gold	Head constable Prince	
2022	Veekam	Dr. Krishnakumar	
2022	Marathakam		
2022	Kaapa	Jabbar	
2022	Rorschach	Head Constable Ashraf	
2022	Mukundan Unni Associates	Judge Sanghameshwaran	
2023	Dear Vaappi	Himself	
2023	Khali Purse of Billionaires	Nidhi's Father	
2023	Purusha Pretham	CPO Dileep	
2023	Pookkaalam	Kochouseph	
2023	Ayalvaashi	Celine's father	
2023	Pappachan Olivilanu	Advocate Pauly	
2023	Theeppori Benny	Vattakuttayil Chettayi	
2023	Garudan	Salam Kaiperi	
2023	Falimy	Chandran	
2023	Neru	Muhammad	
2024	Abraham Ozler	Dr. Xavi Punnoose	
2024	Guruvayoor Ambalanadayil	Sudevan	
2024	Vaazha – Biopic of a Billion Boys	Vishwam's father	
2024	Ajayante Randam Moshanam	Kollan Nanu	
2024	Kishkindha Kaandam	Sumadathan	
2024	Hello Mummy	Samuel	
2024	Marco	Tony Issac	
2025	Rekhachithram	Himself	Cameo appearance
2025	Officer on Duty	Chandrababu	
2025	Pariwar	Sahadevan	
2025	Aabhyanthara Kuttavaali	Advocate Vishwanathan	
2025	Dheeran	Abbas	
2025	The Chronicles of the 4.5 Gang	Maithreyan	SonyLIV series
2026	Appuram	Venu	
2026	Sukhamano Sukhamann		
2026	Masthishka Maranam	Inspector Praveen Shashank	
2026	Bharathanatyam 2 Mohiniyattam	Eapen	
2026	Madhuvidhu	Rajkumar	
2026	Dose		
2026	Kattalan	Ali	
2026	Hail Mary †	TBA	
2026	Pathira Kurukkan †	TBA	

== Writer ==
1. Mutharamkunnu P.O. (1985) (story)
2. Akkare Ninnoru Maran (1985) (story)
3. Mazha Peyyunnu Maddalam Kottunnu (1986) (story)
4. Ponnukudathinu Pottu (1986) (story)
5. Nandi Veendum Varika (1986) (story)
6. Manivatharile Aayiram Sivarathrikal (1987) (dialogue)
7. Oru Muthassi Katha (1988) (story)
8. News (1989) (screenplay and dialogue)
9. Adhipan (1989) (screenplay and dialogue)
10. Minda Poochakku Kalyanam (1990) (screenplay and dialogue)
11. Ganamela (1991) (story and screenplay)
12. April Fool (2010) (screenplay and dialogue)

== Television ==
Year	Serial/program	Channel	Role	Notes	Show format
1995	Kairali Vilasam Lodge	Doordarshan		TV debut	Serial
2000	Saregama	Asianet	Host		Musical show
2001	Jagadish TV	Asianet	Host		
2002	Chila Kudumba Chithrangal	Kairali TV	Vishwanathan	Replaced Siddique	Serial
2002-2004	Life is Beautiful	Asianet	Vishwanathan	Sequel of Chila Kudumba Chitrangal	Serial
2006-2008	Minnum Tharam	Asianet	Host		Game show
2010-2013	Comedy Stars	Asianet	Judge		Reality show
2011	Nammal Thammil	Asianet	Host	Replaced Sreekandan Nair	Talk show
2012-2013	Lunars Comedy Express	Asianet Plus	Judge	Later left the show	Reality show
2013–2021	Comedy Stars Season 2	Asianet	Judge		Reality show
2016-2017	Rahasya Sancharangal	Asianet Plus	Host	Replaced Shankar Ramakrishnan	Crime Series
2017	Oru Cilma Kadha	Amrita TV	Various roles		Serial
2017	Great Magical Circus	Amrita TV	Judge		Reality show
2020	Veendum Chila Veetuviseshangal	Asianet	Host		Comedy Talk show
2021	Onamamankam Bigg Boss	Asianet	Co-Host		Onam Special show
2021	Comedy Mamankam	Asianet	Co-Host		Onam Special show
2022–2023	Panam Tharum Padam	Mazhavil Manorama	Host		Game show
2023	Star Singer	Asianet	Guest Jury		Reality show
2025	Enkile Ennodu Para	Asianet	Guest		Reality show
2025	Bigg Boss Malayalam season 7	Asianet	Performer in a skit		Reality show

== Playback singer ==
Year	Film/album	Song(s)	Lyricist	Music director
1995	Praayikkara Paappaan	"Kokkum Poonchirakum"	Bichu Thirumala	SP Venkitesh
1998	British Market	"Kuchipudi Kuchipadi Aadi Varum"	Gireesh Puthenchery	Rajamani
1998	Achaammakkuttiyude Achaayan	"Cheppu Kilukki Nadakkana Rappayi"	Sarath Vayalar	Kalavoor Balan
2005	Kalyaanakkurimaanam	"Keralam Oru"	Bichu Thirumala, S Ramesan Nair, Joy Thamalam, Suresh Krishnamoorthy	Ronnie Raphael
2009	The Stars	"Idamvalam Thiinju"		K A Latheef

== Dubbing ==
Year	Film	For Whom	Character
1982	Idavela		
2003	Magic Magic 3D	Owen Burke	Villain's assistant
2010	Kushti		
