= Kanakalatha =

Indian actress (1960–2024)

- Born: 24 August 1960; Kollam, Kerala, India
- Died: 6 May 2024 (aged 63); Thiruvananthapuram, Kerala, India
- Occupation: Actress
- Years active: 1981–2024
- Parents: Parameshwaran Pillai; Chinnamma

Kanakalatha (24 August 1960 – 6 May 2024) was an Indian actress who worked predominantly in the Malayalam cinema.

== Personal life and death ==
Kanakalatha was born to Parameshwaran Pillai and Chinnamma at Kollam, Kerala. She attended the Government Girls School, Kollam. Before starting her film career, she was a theatre artist. She was divorced.

In her later years, Kanakalatha suffered from dementia and died from complications of the disease on 6 May 2024, at the age of 63.

== Filmography ==
=== Malayalam ===
==== 1970s ====
Year	Title	Role	Notes
1979	Radha Enna Pennkutti		

==== 1980s ====
Year	Title	Role	Notes
1980	Unarthupattu		
1981	Aparna		
1981	Aambal Poovu	Geetha	
1982	Chillu	Servant	
1982	Chambalkadu		
1982	Kakka		
1982	Snehapoorvam Meera	Dolly	
1982	Kaattile Paattu	Lathadevi	
1983	Kaattaruvi	Chellamma	
1983	Thayambaka		
1983	Aadyathe Anuraagam		
1983	Eenam		
1983	Rugma		
1983	Prem Nazirine Kanmanilla		
1983	Parasparam	College student	
1984	Aagraham		
1984	Sayam Sandhya	Interviewer	
1985	Kattuthee		
1986	Kariyilakkattu Pole		Dubbing only
1986	Dheivatheyorthu		
1986	Malarum Kiliyum	Vasanthi	
1986	Aayiram Kannukal	Ammini	
1986	Veendum	Doctor	
1986	Kshamichu Ennoru Vakku	Police Constable	
1986	Sunil Vayassu 20		
1986	Rajavinte Makan		
1986	Prathyekam Sradhikkukka		
1986	Sree Narayana Guru	Narayanan's mother	
1986	Arappatta Kettiya Gramathil	Sreedevi	
1987	Swathi Thirunal	Narayani's Thozhi	
1987	Ezhuthapurangal		
1987	Swargam		
1988	Ambalakkara Panchayat		
1988	Kandathum Kettathum	Krishnankutty's sister	
1989	Jagratha	Rugmini	
1989	Krooran		
1989	Kaalal Pada		
1989	Kireedam	Ambika	
1989	Nagarangalil Chennu Raparkam	Girija	

==== 1990s ====
Year	Title	Role	Notes
1990	Crime Branch	Adv. Latha	
1990	Vasavadutta	Principal	
1990	Vyooham	Geetha	
1990	Apsarassu		
1990	Pavakkoothu		
1990	The Judgement		
1990	Chuvappu Naada		
1990	Ponnaranjanam	Ayyappan's wife	
1990	Randam Varavu	Dr. Renuka Menon	
1990	Champion Thomas	Nalini	
1990	Purappadu	Beevathu	
1990	Kattukuthira	Nani	
1990	Superstar	Panchali	
1990	Appu	Elizabeth	
1991	Bhoomika	Yasodhamma	
1991	Aadhyamayi		
1991	Ente Sooryaputhrikku		
1991	Mimics Parade		
1991	Nayam Vyakthamakkunnu		
1991	Souhrudam	Mrs. Menon	
1991	Kasarkode Khaderbai	Latha's mother	
1991	Koodikazhcha	Saraswathi	
1991	Inspector Balram	Madhavan's wife	
1991	Ennum Nanmakal	Devaki	
1992	Welcome to Kodaikanal	Teacher	
1992	Kallanum Policum	Devaki	
1992	Mukhamudra		
1992	Ennodu Ishtam Koodamo		
1992	Kizhakkan Pathrose	Fish vendor	
1992	Kauravar	School Teacher	
1992	Oru Kochu Bhoomikulukkam	Soudhamini	
1992	Kudumbasametham	Uma	
1993	Thalamura	Gracy	
1993	Bharathettan Varunnu		
1993	Ammayane Sathyam		
1993	Padaliputhram		
1993	Gandhari		
1993	Uppukandam Brothers	Annamma Chandy	
1993	Customs Diary	Mercykutty	
1993	Bandhukkal Sathrukkal	Chellamma	
1993	Mithunam	Sivaraman's wife	
1993	Addeham Enna Iddeham	Seithali's wife	
1993	Chenkol	Ambika	
1993	Sowbhagyam	Suseela Subramaniyan	
1994	Ponthan Mada		
1994	Dollar	Eliyamma	
1994	Kinnaripuzhayoram	Savithri	
1994	Moonnaam Loka Pattaalam	Sasi's mother	
1994	Manathe Kottaram	Servant	
1994	Varanamaalyam	Vasanthi	
1994	Vaardhakyapuraanam	Sumithra	
1994	Vendor Daniel State Licency		
1994	Pidakkozhi Koovunna Noottandu	Malathi Menon	
1994	Cabinet	Gomathiyamma	
1994	Manthrikante Pravukal		
1994	Harichandanam		
1994	Nandini Oppol		
1994	Vadhu Doctoranu	Bharathi	
1994	Bheesmacharya		
1994	Tharavaadu	Srilakshmi	
1995	Sundaran Neeyum Sundaran Njanum	Subhadra	
1995	Keerthanam	Kariya's wife	
1995	Prayikkara Pappan		
1995	Kalyanji Anandji	Kalyanakrishnan's sis-in-law	
1995	Kokkarakko	Meenakshi	
1995	Mangalam Veettil Manaseswari Gupta	Narayanankutty's wife	
1995	Kalamasseriyil Kalyanayogam	Soudamini	
1995	Aadyathe Kanmani	Kausalya	
1995	Thacholi Varghese Chekavar	Omana	
1995	Sipayi Lahala	Thankamma	
1995	Oru Panchathanthram Katha		
1995	Thumboli Kadappuram		
1995	Kusruthikaatu	Indira's aunt	
1995	Perariyappookkal	Radhika's mother	
1995	Spadikam	Kuttikadan's wife	
1995	Aniyan Bava Chetan Bava	Devi Thampuratti	
1995	Kakkakkum Poochakkum Kalyanam		
1995	Maanikyachempazhukka	Sumi/Sumangala Devi	
1995	Puthukkottayile Puthumanavalan	Bhanumathi	
1995	Achan Rajavu Appan Jethavu	Annamma	
1995	Maanthrikante Praavukal		
1995	Parvathy Parinayam	Savithri	
1996	The Porter		
1996	Nandagopalante Kusruthikal		
1996	Sankeeerthanam Pole		
1996	Mayooranritham	Sakunthala	
1996	Pallivathukkal Thomichan	Kathreena's sister	
1996	Sathyabhamakkoru Premalekhanam	Kochammini	
1996	Malayaalamaasam Chingam Onninu		
1996	Lalanam	Matron	
1996	Hitlist		
1996	Kanchanam	Prof. Ravi's wife	
1996	Samoohyapaadam	Kanakalatha	
1996	Kinnam Katta Kallan		
1997	Killikurishiyile Kudumbamela	Kunjannamma	
1997	Kilukil Pambaram	Sugandhi's mother	
1997	Guru		
1997	The Good Boys		
1997	Newspaper Boy	Prasannakumari	
1997	Varnapakittu	Sunny's elder sister	
1997	Raajathanthram	Keshava Menon's wife	
1997	Oru Yathramozhi		
1997	Sankeerthanam Pole		Cameo appearance
1997	Adukkala Rahasyam Angaadi Paattu	Meena	
1997	Ancharakkalyaanam	Karthiyayani	
1997	Aniathipravu	Gracy	
1997	Manthra Mothiram	Lakshmi's mother	
1997	Mayaponman	Devaki Kunjamma	
1998	Mayilpeelikkavu		
1998	Aghosham	Leelamma	
1998	Harikrishnans	Ammalu's aunt	
1998	Chenapparambile Aanakkaryam	Kuttikrishna Menon's wife	
1998	British Market	Changanassery sister	
1998	Mattupetti Machan	Santha Prabhu	
1999	F.I.R	Madhavi/Mariya	
1999	Tokyo Nagarathile Viseshangal	Kanakam	
1999	Kannezhuthi Pottum Thottu		
1999	Onnaamvattam Kandappol	Sophia's aunt	
1999	Aakasha Ganga	Daisy's mother	
1999	Stalin Sivadas	Saramma	
1999	Pushpull		
1999	Swarnanilavu		
1999	Indulekha		

==== 2000s ====
Year	Title	Role	Notes
2000	Neelathadaakatthile Nizhalppakshikal		
2000	Priye Ninakkaayi		
2000	Pilots		
2000	Mera Naam Joker	Dinamma	
2000	The Warrant	Aparna's aunt	
2000	The Judgement	Bharathi	
2000	Cover Story		
2000	Priyam	Unni's wife	
2001	Bhadra		
2001	Vakkalathu Narayanankutty	Officer	
2001	Rithumathi		
2001	Jamindar		
2001	Swargavaathil		
2001	Dhosth	College Professor	
2001	Naranathu Thampuran	Sulochana	
2001	Korappan The Great	Korappan's wife	
2001	Sharja To Sharja		
2001	Ee Nadu Innalevare	Thankamani	
2001	Ee Raavil		
2001	Pranayaaksharangal		
2001	Agrahaaram		
2001	Vezhambal		
2002	Sundaripravu	Sarath's mother	
2002	Aabharanachaarthu		
2002	Chirikkudukka	Komalavally	
2002	Indraneelakkallu		
2002	Sesham		
2002	Desam		
2003	Anyar	Mymuna's mother	
2003	Swantham Malavika		
2003	Sundarikkutty		
2004	Njan Salperu Ramankutty		
2004	Swarna Medal		
2004	Kottaram Vaidyan		
2005	Izhra		
2005	Kalyanakkurimanam		
2005	Videsi Nair Swadesi Nair	Suma	
2006	Pakal		
2006	Achante Ponnumakkal	Rajalakshmi	
2007	Indrajith	Susheela	
2008	Kovalam		
2008	Thrill		
2008	Ayudham		
2008	Thavalam	Thamara's mother	
2008	Twenty:20		
2009	Dalamarmarangal	Radha	
2009	My Big Father	Khadeeja	

==== 2010s ====
Year	Title	Role	Notes
2010	Kanyakumari Express	Meera Bhai	
2010	Brahmasthram		
2010	Yakshiyum Njanum		
2010	Senior Mandrake		
2010	Again Kasargod Khader Bhai		
2011	Uthappante Kinar		
2011	101 Uruppika		
2011	Priyappetta Nattukare		
2011	Uppukandam Brothers: Back in Action	Sathyaneshan's wife	
2011	Raghuvinte Swantham Rasiya		
2011	Ninnishtam Ennishtam 2		
2012	Bombay Mittayi		
2012	Achante Aanmakkal		
2012	Red Alert		
2012	Lakshmi Vilasam Renuka Makan Raghuram		
2013	Dracula 2012		
2013	Gypsy		
2013	Dear Friends		
2014	Alice: A True Story		
2014	Konthayum Poonoolum	Nun	
2015	Kanamarayathu		
2015	Elanjikkavu P.O.		
2015	Aashamsakalode Anna		
2015	Moonam Naal		
2015	My God		
2016	Aneezya		
2017	Dance Dance		
2017	Jack Fruit		
2017	Devakinadanam	Renuka	
2017	Red Run	Suran's mother	
2017	Pakal Pole		
2018	Panchavarnathatha	Bride's mother	
2018	Kenalum Kinarum		
2018	Prashna Parihaara Shaala		
2018	Purple		
2018	The Reaction		
2018	Police Junior		
2018	Ippozhum Eppozhum Sthuthiyayirikkatte	Sumarani	
2018	Oru Dubaikkary	Pushpa	
2018	Swarmappathaayam		
2019	Vallikkettu	Mary	
2019	Kosrakollikal	Devayani	
2019	Vishudha Pusthakam		
2019	Priyapettavar		
2019	Sakthan Market	Sumithra	
2019	Arayakkadavil		
2019	Aakasha Ganga 2	Daisy's mother	
2019	Oru Patham Classile Pranayam		
2019	Prasnapariharashala		
2019	Kochiyude Tharangal		
2019	Idukki Blasters		
2019	Aravindan Parayatte		

==== 2020s ====
Year	Title	Role	Notes
2020	Maayavanam Bunglow		
2021	Oru Pappadavada Premam	Faisal's mother	
2023	Samadhanathinte Vellaripraavukal		
2023	3 Days		
2023	IPC 302		
2023	Pookkaalam	Susheel's mother	

=== Tamil ===
Year	Title	Role	Notes
1991	Karpoora Mullai		
1992	Unakkaga Piranthen		
2017	Ilai	Tea Shop Owner	
2018	Uzhaikkum Paadhai		
2019	Iruttu		

== Television career ==
- Paliyathachan (DD Malayalam)
- Preyasi (Surya TV)
- Sagaracharitham
- Pakida Pakida Pambaram (DD Malayalam)
- Agnisakshi
- Jwalayayi
- Veendum Jwalayayi
- Parinamam
- Ayisha
- Devaganga
- Women's Club
- Nagarathil Yakshi
- Jwala
- Sethuvinte Kathakal
- Uma
- Snehasammanam
- Snehadharangalode
- Swathu
- Vajram
- Ettu Sundarikalum Njanum
- Pavithra Jailillan as Jailer
- Snehapoorvam Lakshmi
- Manjadimanikal
- Mandoos (Kairali TV)
- Akshayapathram (Asianet)
- Alimanthrikan (Asianet)
- Tharavum Ponmuttaym (DD Malayalam)
- Jalamohini (Asianet)
- Harichandhnam (Asianet)
- Dracula (Asianet)
- Alaudhinte Albuthavilakku (Asianet)
- Velankani Mathavu (Asianet)
- Amma (Asianet)
- Pranayam (Asianet)
- Thulabharam (Surya TV)
- Sree Guruvayoorappan (Surya TV)
- Ente Manasaputhri (Asianet)
- Vava (Surya TV)
- Vasundhara Medicals (Asianet)
- Sooryaputhri (Surya TV)
- Devaragam (Asianet)
- Ammathottil (Asianet)
- Indumukhi Chandramathi (Surya TV)
- Swamiye Saramayyappa (Surya TV)
- Twenty Twenty One (20:21) (Asianet)
- Alaudeenum Albuthavilakkum (Asianet)
- Chandrodayam (Doordarshan)
- Oru Poo Viriyunnu (DD)
- Paattukalude Paattu (Surya TV)
- Ponnum Poovum (Amrita TV)
- Swami Ayyappan (Asianet)
- Kadamattathu Kathanar (Asianet)
- Ennu Swantham Jani (Surya TV)
- Ganga (Doordarshan)
- Sathyam Sivam Sundaram (Amrita TV)
- Ayalathe Sundari (Surya TV)
- Police (ACV)
- Pookkalam Varavayi (Zee Keralam)
- Oru Nimisham
- Wish You a Happy New Year
- Adipoli Family
- Sundarapurushan
- Aanakaryam Chenakaryam - webseries
- Kashithumbi
- Panchali Swayamvaram

== Dramas ==
- Pramani
- Indulekha
- Swathi Thirunnal
