= Itha Innu Muthal =

1984 Indian film

- Poster designed by P. N. Menon
- Directed by: Reji (T. S. Suresh Babu)
- Screenplay by: A. Sheriff
- Story by: Reji (T. S. Suresh Babu)
- Starring: Shankar; Maniyanpilla Raju; Bhuvana Saravana; Adoor Bhasi; Sreenath; Ranipadmini
- Cinematography: C. E. Babu
- Edited by: G. Venkittaraman
- Music by: Shyam
- Production company: Royal Films
- Distributed by: Royal Films
- Release date: 23 November 1984
- Running time: 135 minutes
- Language: Malayalam

Itha Innu Muthal (transl. It's from today onwards) is a 1984 Indian Malayalam-language comedy film directed by Reji (T. S. Suresh Babu) and written by A. Sheriff from a story by Reji. The film stars an ensemble cast led by Shankar, Maniyanpilla Raju, Bhuvana Saravana, Adoor Bhasi, Sreenath, Jagathy Sreekumar, and Ranipadmini, with an extended cameo by Mammootty and a cameo by Mohanlal.

== Plot ==
Widowed Nair, who owns a firm, lives with his only daughter, Sindhu. Nair's nephew, Gopi eyes to marry Sindhu. After knowing Gopi's intentions, Sindhu elopes with her lover Shankar.

== Cast ==
- Shankar as Shankar
- Maniyanpilla Raju as Raju
- Bhuvana Saravana as Sindhu
- Adoor Bhasi as T. P. Bhaskaran Nair
- Sreenath as Gopi/Jimmy Fernandez
- Ramu as Ramu
- Santhosh K. Nayar as Santhosh
- Jagathy Sreekumar as Kundera Kuttappan
- Mala Aravindan
- Vettoor Purushan
- Kunchan as Kunju
- V. D. Rajappan as Thacholi Thankappan
- Poojappura Ravi as Ravi
- Sukumari as Gopi's mother
- Rani Padmini as Nimmy
- Uma Bharani as Sharada
- Santhakumari as Santhamma
- Bheeman Raghu as Rajkumar
- Mammootty as Jayamohan
- Mohanlal as Mohanlal, CBI officer (cameo)

== Soundtrack ==
The music was composed by Shyam and the lyrics were written by Chunakkara Ramankutty.

| No. | Song | Singers | Lyrics | Length (m:ss) |
|---|---|---|---|---|
| 1 | "Eenam Maniveenakambikal Meettum" | K. J. Yesudas, Chorus | Chunakkara Ramankutty | |
| 2 | "Raajave Raajave" | Unni Menon, C. O. Anto, Krishnachandran | Chunakkara Ramankutty | |
| 3 | "Vasanthamaayi" | K. J. Yesudas, Shyam | Chunakkara Ramankutty | |
| 4 | "Vellaambal Pookkunna" | K. J. Yesudas, Lathika | Chunakkara Ramankutty | |

== Trivia ==
- This is the debut release of director T. S. Suresh Babu and his name was shown as "Reji" in title card, which he later rechristened.
