= T. S. Suresh Babu =

Indian film director

T.S.Suresh Babu
- Born: Poojappura, Thiruvananthapuram, Kerala, India
- Other name: Reji
- Occupations: Film director Screen writer
- Years active: 1980–present
- Spouse: Sreeja
- Children: Parvathy Suresh

T.S. Suresh Babu is an Indian film director, concentrating mainly on Malayalam movies. He started his career in the cinema industry by assisting the renowned director P.G. Viswambharan. He started his career as an independent director under the name Reji with the successful film Itha Innu Muthal starring Shankar, Mammootty and Mohanlal together. His Kottayam Kunjachan is regarded as a cult classic in Malayalam cinema He is also a board member of KSFDC.

== Filmography ==
Year	Title	Cast	Notes
1984	Itha Innu Muthal	Shankar, Mammootty, Mohanlal	
1985	Oru Naal Innoru Naal	Prem Nazir, Shankar, Ratheesh	
1986	Ponnum Kudathinum Pottu	Shankar, Menaka, Mukesh, Rohini	
1988	Sanghunadam	Mammootty, Nalini, Ratheesh, Suresh Gopi	
1990	Kottayam Kunjachan	Mammootty, Ranjini, Sukumaran, Innocent, Babu Antony	
1991	Koodikazhcha	Jayaram, Jagadeesh, Sukumaran, Urvashi, Babu Antony	
1992	Maanyanmar	Mukesh, Sreenivasan, Jagadeesh, Ramyakrishnan	
1992	Kizhakkan Pathrose	Mammootty, Urvashi, Parvathy, Raghuvaran	
1993	Customs Diary	Jayaram, Mukesh, Ranjitha, Radha Ravi	
1993	Uppukandam Brothers	Jagadeesh, Captain Raju, Mohan Raj, Babu Antony, Geetha, Maathu	
1994	Palayam	Manoj K. Jayan, Ratheesh, Urvashi, Srividya	
1995	Prayikkara Pappan	Jagadeesh, Madhu, Murali, Geetha, Chippy	
1995	Indian Military Intelligence	Murali, Babu Antony, M. G. Soman, Sukumaran, Srividya	
1997	Shibiram	Manoj K. Jayan, Sukumaran, Divya Unni	
1999	Stalin Sivadas	Mammootty, Kusbhoo, Captain Raju, Shankar	
2000	Mark Antony	Suresh Gopi, Divya Unni, Kaveri, Lalu Alex	
2010	Kanyakumari Express	Suresh Gopi, Lena, Babu Antony, Sarayu	
2011	Uppukandam Brothers Back in Action	Srikanth, Babu Antony, Vani Viswanath, Richard Rishi, Honey Rose	
2024	DNA	Ashkar Saudan, Babu Antony, Rai Laxmi	
