= Aparna (1981 film) =

- Directed by: C. P. Padmakumar
- Written by: P. C. George; C. P. Padmakumar
- Produced by: C. P. Padmakumar
- Starring: Prathap Pothen; Balakrishna Pillai; Jayan; Kanakalatha
- Cinematography: Vipin Mohan
- Edited by: K. R. Bose
- Production company: Sahya
- Distributed by: Sahya
- Release date: 31 December 1981
- Country: India
- Language: Malayalam

Aparna is a 1981 Indian Malayalam film, directed and produced by C. P. Padmakumar. The film stars Prathap Pothen, Balakrishna Pillai, Jayan and Kanakalatha in the lead roles.

== Cast ==
- Prathap Pothen
- Balakrishna Pillai
- Jayan
- Kanakalatha
- Master Tony
- N. K. Gopalakrishnan
- Sudarsna
