= Priyappetta Nattukare =

- Film poster
- Directed by: Sreejith Palery
- Written by: T.K.Santosh
- Screenplay by: T.K.Santosh
- Story by: T.K.Santosh
- Produced by: Sajesh Nair
- Starring: Kalabhavan Mani; Bala; Lakshmi Sharma; Mallika
- Cinematography: Sudhi
- Edited by: V. Sajan
- Music by: Aji Saras
- Production company: Grami Entertainment Company
- Release date: 25 August 2011 (Location)
- Country: India
- Language: Malayalam

Priyappetta Nattukare is a 2011 Malayalam political thriller film directed by debutant Sreejith Palery, starring Kalabhavan Mani and Bala in the lead roles.

== Plot ==
Priyappetta Nattukare is a political thriller film. Kalabhavan Mani is a communist party activist and Bala is the activist of their opposition party. The political fights between the two form the story.

== Cast ==
- Kalabhavan Mani as Sakhavu Manikandadasan
- Bala as Satheeshan
- Lakshmi Sharma as Priyankari (Fake)
- Roslin as Sakhavu Manikandadasan's mother
- Mallika as Ambili
- Jagathy Sreekumar as Gandhi Kittan
- Kalabhavan Shajon as Mani
- Suraj Venjaramoodu
- Mala Aravindan as Sakhavu Pappan
- M. R. Gopakumar as Sakhavu Appu
- Aneesh Ravi as Sakhavu Chandran
- JayaKrishnan as
- Ganesh Kumar as G.K
- Poojapurra Radhakrishnan
- Nandu
- Sukumari as Vilasini
- Kanakalatha
- Geetha Nair

== Production ==
Mukesh was initially cast in the role of a communist Dasan.
