= Simhadhwani =

- Directed by: K. G. Rajasekharan
- Written by: Pappanamkodu Lakshmanan
- Starring: Thilakan; Urvashi; Suresh Gopi; Mala Aravindan
- Cinematography: Kanniyappan
- Edited by: K. S. Sivachandran
- Music by: Kannur Rajan
- Production company: Samraj Productions
- Distributed by: Samraj Productions
- Release date: 20 November 1992
- Country: India
- Language: Malayalam

Simhadhwani is a 1992 Indian Malayalam film, directed by K. G. Rajasekharan. The film stars Thilakan, Urvashi, Suresh Gopi and Mala Aravindan in the lead roles. The film has musical score by Kannur Rajan.

== Cast ==
- Devi Bala As Molly Thomas
- Thilakan
- Urvashi
- Suresh Gopi
- Mala Aravindan
- M. G. Soman
- Balan K. Nair
- Captain Raju
- Shari
- P. R. Varalekshmi
- Pattom Sadan
- Sujatha
- A.T.Samuel(Sam)

== Soundtrack ==
The music was composed by Kannur Rajan and the lyrics were written by Mankombu Gopalakrishnan.

No.	Song	Singers	Lyrics	Length (m:ss)
1	"Oru Maatta Thirunaalin"	M. G. Sreekumar, Ambili	Mankombu Gopalakrishnan	
2	"Samkrama Theru"	M. G. Sreekumar	Mankombu Gopalakrishnan	
3	"Thaalam Njan Tharangam Njan"	Ambili	Mankombu Gopalakrishnan	
