= Varnapakittu =

1997 Indian Malayalam drama film directed by I. V. Sasi

- Poster designed by Gayathri Ashokan
- Directed by: I. V. Sasi
- Screenplay by: Babu Janardhanan
- Story by: Jokuttan
- Produced by: Jokuttan
- Starring: Mohanlal; Meena
- Cinematography: Aravind Kamalanathan
- Edited by: K. Narayanan
- Music by: Vidyasagar
- Production company: BJL Creations
- Distributed by: Pranamam Pictures
- Release date: 4 April 1997
- Running time: 160 minutes
- Country: India
- Language: Malayalam
- Budget: ₹2.75 crore

Varnapakittu (transl. Vibrant colors) is a 1997 Indian Malayalam-language romantic thriller film directed by I. V. Sasi and written by Babu Janardhanan from a story by Jokuttan. The film features Mohanlal and Meena in lead roles along with Divya Unni, Madhu, Jagadish, Dileep, Rajan P. Dev, and M. G. Soman in supporting roles. The movie was a super hit in box office.

== Plot ==
Sunny Palamattam is a successful businessman in Singapore. He enjoys a flamboyant life with his girlfriend Sandra Valookaran. His business rival, Mohammad Ali, was a partner who left after he was found embezzling company funds.

Sunny discloses his past to Sandra: his family was happy until Pappan framed Sunny's father, Ittichan, in a fraud case. Shortly after, Ittichan died of a heart attack, and Sunny's engagement with fiancée, Nancy, was called off. Sunny fled to Mumbai and then to Singapore with Kuruvilla's help.

Later, Sunny learns that Sandra is actually a call girl hired by Mohammad Ali to spy on Sunny and foil his business plans. To fulfill his marriage commitment to his family, he and Sandra pretend they are still engaged when they go to visit Sunny's family in Kerala. In his hometown, he meets the old enemies who falsely accused his father of theft and thus ruined the family's reputation.

Sunny plans to take revenge on Pappan, Tonychen, and company, aided by Paily. In the meantime, he meets Nancy, who is now married to Paulachen, Tonychen's younger brother. When Tony tries to sexually assault Nancy, Paulachan is humiliated and commits suicide.

Mohammad Ali arrives with a gang from Singapore to reveal Sunny's "false marriage" ploy in an attempt to destroy him. Sunny pleads with Mohammad Ali to forget everything so that he can live a happy life and offers all his assets to Mohammad Ali. Mohammad Ali has a change of heart and leaves Sunny and his family alone. In the end, Sunny and Sandra appear with a happy family.

== Cast ==
- Mohanlal as Sunny Palamattom
- Meena as Sandra / Alina, Sunny's Girlfriend and Wife
- Divya Unni as Nancy Paul, Sunny's Ex-Lover
- Jagadish as Paily, Sunny's Friend
- Madhu as Palamattom Ittichan, Sunny's Father
- Dileep as Pullankunnel Paulachan, Nancy's Husband
- Rajan P. Dev as Pullankunnel Pappan, Paulachan's Father
- K. B. Ganesh Kumar as Pullankunnel Tonychan, Paulachan's Brother
- Janardhanan as Ramaswamy Iyer
- M. G. Soman as Kuruvilla
- Reena as Kuruvilla's wife
- Bheeman Raghu as SI Damodaran Nair
- N. F. Varghese as Father Joseph Varghese
- Sadiq as Kunjoonju
- Bharathi Vishnuvardhan as Sunny's mother
- Kanakalatha as Sunny's elder sister
- Reshmi Soman as Mollykutty, Sunny's younger sister
- Bindhu Varappuzha as Sunny's Second sister
- Mini Arun as Sossamma, Sunny's Third sister
- Kazan Khan as Mohammed Ali
- Kundara Johny as Advocate Chandrashekharan, Sunny's Advocate
- Usha as Tonychen's wife
- Seetha as Sukanya, Sandra's sister
- Yavanika Gopalakrishnan as Sunny's brother in law
- Maya as TV reporter
- Elias Babu as Kunjukochu, Nancy's father
- Antony Perumbavoor as a man in store

== Soundtrack ==
The songs were composed by Vidyasagar. "Velli Nila" is based on "Ooohalalo Oopirilo" from Urmila (1993).

No.	Title	Lyrics	Artist(s)	Length
1.	"Aakashangalil"	Gireesh Puthencherry	K S Chitra
2.	"Anupama Sneha Chaithanyame"	Jose Kallukulam	K S Chitra
3.	"Okkela Okkela"	Gireesh Puthencherry Gangai Amaran	M. G. Sreekumar Sujatha Mohan
4.	"Velli Nila"	Gireesh Puthencherry	M G Sreekumar K S Chitra
5.	"Manikyakallaal"	Gireesh Puthencherry	M. G. Sreekumar, Swarnalatha
6.	"Doore Mamarakkombil"	Gireesh Puthencherry	K. S. Chitra
7.	"Doore Mamarakkombil"	Gireesh Puthencherry	M. G. Sreekumar

== Box Office ==
Varnapakittu was a major commercial hit in the year 1997 and was the beginning of the Mohanlal-Meena hit combo, which churned out many movies, including Olympian Anthony Adam, Mr. Brahmachari, Natturajavu, Udayananu Tharam, Chandrolsavam, Drishyam, Munthirivallikal Thalirkkumbol, Drishyam 2, and Bro Daddy.
