= Customs Diary =

- Directed by: T. S. Suresh Babu
- Written by: C. K. Jeevan; A. S. R. Nair
- Produced by: Makam Movies
- Starring: Mukesh; Jayaram; Jagathy Sreekumar; Ganesh Kumar
- Cinematography: Tony; Ravi K. Chandran
- Edited by: K. Sankunny
- Music by: Raveendran; S. P. Venkatesh (Background Score)
- Distributed by: Gayatri Release
- Release date: August 27, 1993
- Country: India
- Language: Malayalam

Customs Diary is a 1993 Malayalam crime film by T. S. Suresh Babu starring Mukesh, Jayaram, Jagathy Sreekumar and Ganesh Kumar in the lead roles.

== Cast ==
- Mukesh as Rony Vincent/Rajappan/Rojappan
- Jayaram as Anantha Krishnan, Customs officer
- Jagathy Sreekumar as Aravindakshan, Customs officer
- Ganesh Kumar as Jamal
- Ranjitha as Thara
- Kuthiravattam Pappu as Padaval Vishwanathan
- Sainuddin as Vikraman
- Radha Ravi as Kaliyappa
- Keerikkadan Jose as Danny (dubbed by Jayaram)
- Santhosh as Babu
- Kollam Thulasi as Rasheed, Customs officer
- Babu Namboothiri as Padmanabha Iyer
- Mala Aravindan as Skariachan
- Prathapachandran as Customs Officer
- Santhakumari
- Poojappura Ravi
- Kanakalatha as Mercykutty
- Raveendran
- Shahana
- Kaladi Omana
- Kavitha Thampi as Reena, Rony's Sister
- Sabnam
- Seethal
