= Mark Antony (2000 film) =

- Directed by: T. S. Suresh Babu
- Written by: Kaloor Dennis
- Story by: Shaji T Nedumkallel
- Produced by: Safeel; Minraj
- Starring: Suresh Gopi; Divya Unni; Janardanan; Lalu Alex
- Cinematography: Saloo George
- Edited by: Sreekar Prasad
- Music by: Berny-Ignatius (Songs) S.P Venkatesh(Background Score)
- Release date: 2000
- Country: India
- Language: Malayalam

Mark Antony is a 2000 Indian Malayalam action film, directed by T. S. Suresh Babu and produced by Safeel and Minraj. Story by Shaji T Nedumkallel and screenplay and dialogue By Kaloor Dennis. The film stars Suresh Gopi, Divya Unni, Janardanan and Lalu Alex in lead roles. The film had musical score by Berny-Ignatius.

== Cast ==
- Suresh Gopi as Parel Antony aka Mark Anthony
- Janardanan as Parel Pappu Chathu, Antony's father
- Divya Unni as Mambally Nimmy, Antony's love interest
- Lalu Alex as Fr. Parel Urumees
- N. F. Varghese as Mullakka
- K. P. A. C. Lalitha as Kunjoutha, Antony's mother & Pappu's wife
- Madhupal as Parel Pappachan, Antony's youngest brother
- Baiju as Parel Kariyachan, Antony's Younger brother
- Kaveri as Kunjipennu/Reeja, Pappu's daughter and Antony's younger sister
- Adoor Bhavani as Kunjeli
- Indrans as Isaac, Antony's aide
- VK Sreeraman as Mambally Chakkappan
- Bheeman Raghu as Mambally Kuriachen
- Jagannatha Varma as Bishop
- Augustine as Sexton Devassy
- Sadiq as Mambally Babu
- Mala Aravindan as C.K. Ayyappan
- Mohan Jose as Ravikuttan, Ayyappan's son
- Shammi Thilakan as Rajan, ayyappan's son
- Keerikkadan Jose as Muthala Varkey, The main antagonist
- Vimal Raj as Bhairavan, Varkey's assistant and secondary antagonist
- Bindu Panicker as Nimmi's mother
- Kollam Ajith as SI Jagathnathan
- Ravi Menon as Nair
- Shaju as Unnikrishna Varma
- Mani C. Kappen as Pankajakshan
- Vijayan Peringod as Radhakrishnan, Unnikrishna Varma's Father

== Soundtrack ==
Songs
No.	Title	Playback	Length
1.	"Ponkinaakkal"	K. S. Chithra, Biju Narayanan	4:18
2.	"Ponkinaakkal (female)"	K. S. Chithra	3:12
3.	"Kilukkaampetty"	K. J. Yesudas	4:05
