= Purappadu (1990 film) =

- Directed by: Jeassy
- Written by: John Paul
- Produced by: Mak
- Starring: Mammootty; Parvathy; Sumalatha; Thikkurissy Sukumaran Nair; Murali
- Cinematography: Vipindas
- Edited by: K. Sankunni
- Music by: Songs: Ouseppachan Background Music: Shyam
- Production company: MAC Productions
- Distributed by: MAC Release
- Release date: 27 January 1990 (Kerala)
- Running time: 143 minutes
- Country: India
- Language: Malayalam

Purappadu is a 1990 Indian Malayalam-language film directed by Jeassy. The film stars Mammootty, Parvathy Jayaram, Sumalatha and Thikkurissy Sukumaran Nair in the lead roles. The musical score of the film is by Ouseppachan and the lyrics are written by O. N. V. Kurup. The film deals with social issues.

== Cast ==
- Mammootty as Viswanathan
- Murali as Achu
- Parvathy Jayaram as Mallika
- Sumalatha as Nalini
- Siddique as Basheer
- Thikkurissy Sukumaran Nair
- Kaviyoor Ponnamma
- Aranmula Ponnamma as Elippennu
- Philomina
- Sai Kumar as Shivan
- K. B. Ganesh Kumar
- Vijayaraghavan
- Sithara as Kunjumol
- Jose Prakash
- Balan K. Nair as Ravunni Nair
- Adoor Bhavani
- Babu Antony
- M. S. Thripunithura as Thirumeni
- V K Sreeraman as Hajiyar
- Jagathy Sreekumar as Kunjuvarkey
- Kanakalatha as Beevathu
- Mohan Raj as Samuel
- Innocent as Lonappan
- Mamukkoya
- Kollam Thulasi as District Collector

== Production ==
The film was shot in Moolamattom in Kerala likes most Malayalam films, and was produced at MAC Productions. The film was shot by cinematographer Vipindas, and production design was by Kitho. The editing work for Purappadu was conducted by K. Sankunni.

== Music ==
The musical score to the film is by Ouseppachan. The lyrics were written by O. N. V. Kurup, and the playback singers were Ambili, K. J. Yesudas, K.S. Chitra, M. G. Sreekumar, and P. B. Sreenivas. The background music to the film was composed by Shyam. The film features the songs "Annaloonjal" ( a raga), "Doore Doore", "Ee mannu nammude mannu" and "Manjupeyyunna!". The song "Doore Doore" is written by O.N.V. Kurup and is sung by P. B. Sreenivas and K. S. Chithra.

=== Songs ===
#	Title	Singer(s)
1	"Annaloonjal"	K. S. Chithra
2	"Annaloonjal"	K. J. Yesudas
3	"Doore Doore"	Chithra, P. B. Srinivas
4	"Doore Doore"	Yesudas
5	"Ee Mannu Nalla Mannu"	Yesudas
6	"Manju Peyyunna Rathriyil"	M. G. Sreekumar
