= Kizhakkan Pathrose =

- Directed by: T. S. Suresh Babu
- Written by: Dennis Joseph (screenplay); Muttathu Varkey (story)
- Produced by: Thommy Kunju
- Starring: Mammootty; Urvashi; Parvathy; Innocent; K.P.A.C. Lalitha; Raghuvaran; Janardhanan; Anju
- Cinematography: Jayanan Vincent
- Music by: S. P. Venkatesh
- Distributed by: Maruti Pictures
- Release date: 27 August 1992
- Country: India
- Language: Malayalam

Kizhakkan Pathrose is a 1992 Malayalam film, directed by T. S. Suresh Babu, starring Mammootty in the title role. The musical score and songs were composed by S. P. Venkatesh. The film was released around the same time as Adhwaytham and Yoddha.

== Plot ==
Pothen Upadeshi makes his living as a Gospel preacher. He stays in a house that has been granted to him by Chandy Muthalaali for some time so as to get rid of the evil prevailing in that site. Pathrose and Kunjumol are his children. Pathrose tries to make an earning by playing drama. However, it doesn't yield him any good financial benefits. His mother gets him married to Molly so that they get a mini lorry also as dowry. Pathrose joins Chandy Muthalaali to transport his goods to Sait at Ernakulam. Chandy had already bribed the tax officials so as to evade tax at check-posts. Pathrose decides to transport fish from Ernakulam to his hometown and sell to make a profit. However, he is blocked by the authorised fish trader in Ernakulam, Tharakan, who takes away all the fish Pathrose had purchased. Pathrose suffers a heavy loss, however, Molly gives him her ornaments to be pledged. Pathrose fights with the fish trader and transports fish in return. He also transports goods directly without Chandy's knowledge to earn more. When Chandy's men get to know about it, they burn Pathrose's lorry and damage his house. Pathrose also learns that Molly was ditched by Chandy's son earlier. Pathrose leaves his house disappointed. His father takes Molly to her house.

With the financial aid given by Mary, a fish vendor, Pathrose progresses as a fish seller. Occasionally he meets Anthony, who is a drug addict. He joins hands with Anthony and they get jointly involved in the drug business. They also plan Kunjumol's wedding. However, Upadeshi, who is now in an old-age home, refuses to go home for the wedding. Molly and his son also stay with him there. An act of betrayal follows, and finally, the movie ends with hope.

== Cast ==
- Mammootty as Kizhakkan Pathrose
- Urvashi as Mary alias Chala Mary
- Parvathy as Molly, Pathrose's Wife
- Innocent as Pothen Upadeshi, Pathrose's Father
- K. P. A. C. Lalitha as Annamma, Pathrose's Mother
- Raghuvaran as Anthony, Mary's Ex-Husband
- Maniyanpilla Raju as Mathai, Pathrose's Friend
- Zainuddin as Mammad, Pathrose's Friend
- Rajan P. Dev as Chandykkunju Muthalali
- Shehzad Khan as Thomaskutty, Chandykkunju's Son
- Janardhanan as Ponjikkara Appa, Mary's Brother
- Anju as Kunjumol, Pathrose's Sister
- K. B. Ganesh Kumar as James, Thomaskutty and Anthony's Friend
- Bheeman Raghu as Meen Tharakan
- Prathapachandran as Settu
- Kuthiravattam Pappu as Marangodan Devassia, Pathrose's Uncle
- Jagannatha Varma as Kuttikkanam Varkey, Molly's Father
- Kaladi Omana as Molly's mother
- Mala Aravindan as Church Priest
- Poojappura Ravi as Church Priest
- K. P. A. C. Sunny as Church Priest
- Krishnankutty Nair as Astrologer Raghavan
- Kanakalatha as Fish Vendor
- A. T. Jose as Circle Inspector of Police
- Dr. Jayan as Sub Inspector of Police
- Narayanankutty as Bus Conductor
- Kailas Nath as Settu's assistant

== Songs ==
All lyrics are written by O. N. V. Kurup; all music is composed by S. P. Venkatesh.

No.	Title	Artist(s)	Length
1.	"Pathirakkili"	K. J. Yesudas
2.	"Venal Choodin"	K. J. Yesudas
3.	"Thudi Kotti"	K. J. Yesudas
4.	"Neerazhi Penninte"	K. J. Yesudas, K. S. Chithra

The tune of the song "Pathirakkili" was used again as "Jhoot Bol Na Sach Baat Bol De" for Priyadarshan's Bollywood film Saat Rang Ke Sapne.

== Production ==
The film was originally titled Arayan Pathrose.
