= Prathyekam Sradhikkukka =

Prathyyekom Shradikkuka
- Directed by: P. G. Vishwambharan
- Written by: Renji Mathew; Kaloor Dennis (dialogues)
- Screenplay by: Kaloor Dennis
- Produced by: Renji Mathew
- Starring: Mammootty; Lalu Alex; Captain Raju; Mukesh; Baby Shalini
- Cinematography: Anandakuttan
- Edited by: G. Murali
- Music by: Raveendran
- Production company: Bijis Films
- Distributed by: Bijis Films
- Release date: 12 April 1986
- Country: India
- Language: Malayalam

Prathyyekom Shradikkuka is a 1986 Indian Malayalam film, directed by P. G. Vishwambharan and produced by Renji Mathew. The film stars Mammootty, Mukesh, Rohini and Baby Shalini. The film's score was composed by Raveendran.

== Cast ==
- Mammootty as Suresh
- Lalu Alex as SI Jayadevan
- Captain Raju as Shukkoor
- Mukesh as Raju
- Priya as Sophia
- Baby Shalini as Mini
- Mala Aravindan as Detective Veerabhadran
- Sulakshana as Nirmala
- Innocent as Pothachan
- Bob Christo as Christopher
- Jalaja as Shobha
- Kanakalatha
- Babitha as Babitha
- James

== Plot ==
The movie revolves around the plots taken by SI Jayadevan (Lalu Alex) to capture a notorious criminal, Shukkoor (Captain Raju).

SI Jayadevan takes a criminal, Christopher (Bob Christo) into custody, and thinks that he can capture Christopher's boss Shukkoor by questioning him. However, Christopher escapes from jail that night and Jayadevan is disappointed. Suresh (Mammootty) takes quotations for money and is a womanizer. Shukkoor contacts Suresh to loot a bank for a 50-50 deal. Raju (Mukesh) is an associate of Suresh. They loot the bank, and when Suresh asks for his share, he is shot by Shukoor. On hearing the bullet firing sound, police reach the spot and capture both Shukkoor and Suresh. Raju, who was the driver of the car, flees with the looted money. Raju escapes prison owing to lack of evidence. Jayadevan stays with his wife Nirmala (Sulakshana) and daughter Mini (Baby Shalini). Veerabhadran (Mala Aravindan), is the brother of Nirmala and proclaims himself as a detective as well as a writer, and comes to stay with them. Shobha (Jalaja) is the sister of Suresh and is in love with Raju.

While the prisoners were working in a quarry, a tempo van comes there. It was a plan by Shukkoor, and they kill the jailors and escape from the quarry in the tempo. Shukkoor comes to meet Raju, and asks him for the looted money. Raju tells them that the money is in the bank safe. As a precautionary measure, Shukkoor takes away Shobha and tells that once the money is handed back to him, she will be handed over. It was a Saturday, so Raju had to wait till Monday to get the money from the safe. In the meanwhile, Jayadevan gets approval from his senior official to capture Shukkoor with the help of Suresh, who knows his whereabouts. Suresh is taken out of jail and they both go to various places in search of Shukkoor, including that of his girlfriend Sophia's (Priya) house. Owing to fear of being captured, Shukkoor kidnaps Mini and threatens to kill both Mini and Shobha. Whether Jayadevan refrains from his mission and whether they will be able to rescue Mini and Shobha forms the climax.

== Soundtrack ==
The music was composed by Raveendran with lyrics by Balu Kiriyath.

No.	Song	Singers	Lyrics	Length (m:ss)
1	"Omanakkaiyil"	K. S. Chithra	Balu Kiriyath	
2	"Udayam Prabhachoriyum"	K. J. Yesudas	Balu Kiriyath	
