= Mohan Raj =

Indian actor (1955–2024)

- Born: Mohanarajan; 13 November 1955; Kanjiramkulam, Trivandrum, Kerala, India
- Died: 3 October 2024 (aged 69); Kanjiramkulam
- Other names: Mohanraj, Keerikkadan Jose
- Education: University of Kerala
- Occupations: Actor; assistant enforcement officer
- Years active: 1988–2024
- Spouse: Usha
- Children: 2

Mohanarajan (13 November 1955 – 3 October 2024), professionally credited as Mohan Raj, also known as Keerikkadan Jose, was an Indian actor. He primarily worked in Malayalam, Telugu, and Tamil languages, and appeared in two Japanese films. Raj acted in over 300 films.

== Early life ==
Mohan Raj was born as Mohanarajan to Sukumaran Nadar and Pankajakshi in Kanjiramkulam, Thiruvananthapuram, Kerala. He was the second of five sons and had four brothers: Chandran, Sivaprasad, Jayakumar, and Premlal. He was raised in Kanjiramkulam, where he received his schooling at P. K. S. Higher Secondary School. He later graduated with a degree in Economics from Government Arts College, Thiruvananthapuram.

At the age of 20, Mohan Raj enlisted in the Indian Army, where he served for five years before leaving due to a leg injury. He subsequently qualified in several competitive examinations and joined the Central Board of Excise and Customs, serving there for two years. He also secured second rank in the Kerala Police Sub-Inspector examination. Later, he joined the Enforcement Directorate as an Assistant Enforcement Officer (AEO), resigning from his position in Customs. Following his appearance in the 1989 film Kireedam without official permission, he was suspended from service. After a legal dispute that lasted nearly two decades, he was reinstated in 2010 and took voluntary retirement in 2015.

Mohan Raj died on 3 October 2024, at the age of 69.

== Personal life ==
Mohan Raj was married to Usha. They have two daughters, Jaishma and Kaaviya. He settled in Chennai with his family.

== Films ==
=== Malayalam ===
Year	Title	Role	Notes
1988	Moonnam Mura	Gunda	
1989	Kireedam	Keerikkadan Jose	
1989	Artham	Stanley	
1989	Naagapanchami		
1990	Aye Auto	Police Inspector	
1990	Vyooham	Ajith	
1990	Rajavazhcha	Karadi Vasu	
1990	Oliyampukal	Vasu	
1990	Naale Ennundengil	Gajaraja	
1990	Marupuram	Salim	
1990	Shesham Screenil		
1990	Purappadu	Samuel	
1991	Nagarathil Samsara Vishayam	Vikraman	
1991	Aanaval Mothiram	Guru	
1991	Mimics Parade	Hakkim	
1991	Koodikazhcha	'Mortuary' Karunan	
1991	Cheppu Kilukkana Changathi	Kartha's Henchman	
1991	Amina Tailors	Malappuram Moideen	
1991	Kanalkkattu	Kareem Bhai	
1992	Kasarkode Khaderbai	Khader Bhai's right hand	
1992	Kavacham		
1992	Marathon		
1993	Uppukandam Brothers	Uppukandam Paulachan	
1993	Pravachakan	Freddy	
1993	Porutham		
1993	Customs Diary	Danny	
1993	Chenkol	Keerikkadan Jose	
1994	Cabinet	Mahendran	
1994	Vishnu	'Kallan' Raghavan	
1995	Arabikadaloram	Hassanbava	
1995	Mangalam Veettil Manaseswari Gupta		
1996	Hitler	Devarajan	
1996	Naalamkettile Nalla Thambimar	Britto	
1996	Yuvathurki		
1996	Rajaputhran	K. C.	
1997	Aaraam Thampuran	Chenkalam Madhavan	
1997	Bhoopathi	Khader	
1997	Guru	Senadhipan	
1998	Sooryaputhran	Narendran	
1999	Stalin Sivadas	BSS Leader	
1999	Vazhunnor	CI Sahadevan	
1999	Pathram	Chandan Bhai	
1999	Red Indians	Hyder Marakkyar	
2000	Narasimham	Bhaskaran	
2000	Mark Antony	Muthala Varkey	
2000	Thenkasipattanam		
2001	Chenchayam		
2001	Sharja To Sharja		
2003	Janakeeyam	DYSP Mohandas	
2003	The Fire	Circle Inspector	
2003	Mr. Brahmachari	Masthan Majeedbhai	
2005	Naran	Kuttychira Pappan	
2006	Highway Police	Khan Bhai	
2006	Balram vs. Tharadas	Anali Bhaskaran	
2007	Mayavi	Yatheedran	
2007	Time	Sunny Kuriachan	
2007	Hallo	Pattambi Ravi	
2008	Aayudham	DYSP Hamza	
2008	Twenty:20	Goon	
2008	Lollipop	Damu	
2011	Happy Darbar		
2011	Uppukandam Brothers: Back in Action		
2013	KQ		
2015	Chirakodinja Kinavukal	Driver Jose	
2022	Rorschach	Sujatha's father	

=== Telugu ===
Year	Title	Role	Notes
1990	Rowdyism Nasinchali		
1990	Iddaru Iddare	Joseph	
1990	Lorry Driver	Gudiwada Rowdy Rayudu	
1991	Stuartpuram Police Station		
1991	Assembly Rowdy		
1992	Brahma		
1992	Chinarayudu	Pasupathi	
1992	Rowdy Inspector	Bobarlanka Ramabrahmam	
1993	Mechanic Alludu		
1993	Chittemma Mogudu		
1993	Nippu Ravva	Gundappa	
1994	Police Alludu	Peddanna	
1994	Bobbili Simham	Gajendra	
1995	Pokiri Raja	Vicky	
1995	Khaidi Inspector	Beeda Seth	
1996	Soggaadi Pellam	Narasimham	
1996	Sarada Bullodu	Sangliyana	
1997	Pelli Chesukundam	Kaali Charan	
1998	Sivayya		
1998	Sri Ramulayya		
1998	Pavitra Prema	Narsingh	
1999	Samarasimha Reddy		
2001	Narasimha Naidu	Appala Naidu	
2001	Evadra Rowdy	Lal Darwaza Pandu	
2001	Adhipathi	Gajendra	
2002	Chennakesava Reddy	Jai Reddy	
2003	Seetayya	Choudappa	
2003	Palnati Brahmanayudu		
2003	Sivamani	Vasanta's father	
2003	Raghavendra		
2004	Swamy		
2004	Siva Shankar		
2004	Vijayendra Varma		

=== Tamil ===
Year	Title	Role	Notes
1987	Aankalai Nambathey		
1988	Kazhugumalai Kallan		
1991	Dharma Durai	Jose	
1993	Thanga Pappa	Ananthu	
1995	Karnaa	Devaraj	
2001	Dhill	Minister Vedhanayagam	
2002	Ezhumalai	Kalingarayan	
2005	Chandramukhi	Nair	
2006	Madrasi	Police Inspector	
2013	Ameerin Aadhi-Bhagavan	Kondal Rao	

=== Hindi ===
Year	Title	Role
1988	New Delhi	

=== Television serials ===
==== Malayalam ====
- Kadamattathu Kathanar
- Swami Ayyappan
- Moonumani
