= Pravachakan =

- Directed by: P. G. Viswambharan
- Written by: Sasidharan Arattuvazhi
- Produced by: Abraham Paul; Sudheer V. Uthuppan Joseph
- Cinematography: Ramachandra Babu
- Edited by: K. Sankunny
- Music by: S. P. Venkatesh
- Release date: 1993
- Country: India
- Language: Malayalam

Pravachakan is a 1993 Indian Malayalam movie directed by P. G. Viswambharan. The film has notable actors, like Mukesh, Siddique, Shenbaga, Keerikkadan Jose, Mamukkoya, Narendra Prasad, and Rajan P. Dev. It received mixed reviews from critics and audiences. It was a hit at the box office.

== Plot ==
Balagopalan aka Balu is from a family of fortune-tellers. However, he does not like the profession and his ambition is to act in movies. He joins the Oscar acting school to learn acting along with his friends. He has hidden his poor family background from his friends. Balu falls in love with Deepty, whose father is a powerful and influential man. His friend Benny's father is Kurian MLA who runs various illegal businesses. Balu and his friends get beaten up by goons taking revenge against Kurian. Balu's father works as a bird fortune teller on the road but is out of work and struggling. Balu and friends plan on directing and acting in a movie, sponsored by a Singapore producer.

Balu's father passes away leaving his family a financial burden. Their filmmaking plans do not work out, and his responsibility towards his family leads him to start his parrot fortune-teller career on the roadside. Some of his predictions become true and thereby he becomes famous. His successful life has a turning point when the finance minister of the state is kidnapped. The public thinks the minister is kidnapped by Balu's friend's father, Kurian. The story revolves around the mystery behind the kidnapping.

== Cast ==
- Mukesh as Balagopalan / Balu
- Siddique as Prakashan
- Keerikkadan Jose as Freddy
- Mamukkoya as Jaffer Sherif
- Rajeev Rangan as Benny
- Narendra Prasad as MLA Kurian
- Shenbaga as Deepthi (Balu's love interest)
- Kuthiravattam Pappu as Sathyaseelan
- Rajan P. Dev as Menon
- Philomina as Balau's grandmother
- Mala Aravindan as Velandi
- M. S. Thripunithura as Chief Minister of Kerala
- Paravoor Bharathan Deepthi's uncle
- Bobby Kottarakkara as Daniel
- Jagannathan as Finance Minister Chackochan
- Sashikumar as Madanlal
- Maniyanpilla Raju as himself
- Beena Antony as Kusumam
- Suma Jayaram as Balu's sister
- Machan Varghese
- Kalabhavan Haneef
