= Kshamichu Ennoru Vakku =

- Directed by: Joshiy
- Written by: A. R. Mukesh; Kaloor Dennis (dialogues)
- Screenplay by: Kaloor Dennis
- Starring: Mammootty; Shobana
- Cinematography: Jayanan Vincent
- Edited by: K. Sankunni
- Music by: Shyam
- Production company: JB Combines
- Distributed by: JB Combines
- Release date: 11 April 1986
- Country: India
- Language: Malayalam

Kshamichu Ennoru Vaakku (transl. A word of Apology) is a 1986 Indian Malayalam film, directed by Joshiy. The film stars Geetha, Mammootty and Shobhana in the lead roles. The film has musical score by Shyam.

== Cast ==
- Mammootty as Adv. Ravindranath
- Shobana as Indu, Ravindranath's wife
- Mukesh as Satheesh
- Geetha as Sreedevi, Satheesh's lover
- K.P.A.C. Sunny as Veera Raghava Menon
- Kaviyoor Ponnamma as Shanthamma
- Master Prasobh as Sreedevi's Son
- Srividya as Sasikala
- Urvashi as Rajani (Cameo Appearance)
- Jagathy Sreekumar as Watch Paramu
- Mala Aravindan as Panikkar
- Jose Prakash as Judge
- Kanakalatha as Police Constable
- Santhosh

== Soundtrack ==
The music was composed by Shyam and the lyrics were written by Poovachal Khader.

No.	Song	Singers	Lyrics	Length (m:ss)
1	"Aathmaavin Sangeetham Nee"	P. Jayachandran	Poovachal Khader	
2	"Aathmaavin Sangeetham Nee" (F)	K. S. Chithra	Poovachal Khader	
3	"Ente Uyiraayi Nee Maari"	K. S. Chithra, Unni Menon	Poovachal Khader	
4	"Ragangal Raginikal"	K. S. Chithra	Poovachal Khader	
