= Mala Aravindan =

Indian film actor (1939–2015)

- Born: T. K. Aravindan; 15 January 1939; Vadavucode, Ernakulam, British India
- Died: 28 January 2015 (aged 76); Coimbatore, Tamil Nadu, India
- Other name: Mala (മാള)
- Occupations: Actor; tabla percussionist
- Years active: 1976–2015
- Spouse: Geetha

Mala Aravindan (15 January 1939 – 28 January 2015) was an Indian actor. He was best known for his work as a comedian and character artist in Malayalam films. He has acted in over 500 films.

== Early life ==
Aravindan was born at Vadavucode in the Ernakulam district of Kerala, as the eldest son of Thanattu Ayyappan and Ponnamma. His father was an excise department employee, and his mother, a school music teacher. Soudamini, late Ramanathan (died in 2004), and Prakashan are his siblings.

Aravindan's father died when he was studying in seventh class. Later, when his mother got transferred, his family relocated to Mala in the Thrissur district, and he started using the place name as a prefix to his name. He had his primary education from St. Antony's High School, Mala, where his mother was a music teacher. Seeing his talent in playing the Tabla, his mother joined him with Cochin Mohammed Ustad, a famous Tabla artist. He joined for Pre-degree at Christ College, Irinjalakuda, but dropped out in between to concentrate on his career.

== Career ==
Aravindan started his career as a Tabla artist. He joined stage plays and started playing Tabla as a background artist. Later, he moved into acting and started performing in professional stage plays of Kottayam National Theaters, Nadakashala, Suryasoma Theatres etc. He continued acting in dramas for 12 years. He has won Kerala State Nataka Academy's Best Actor award for his role in Sooryasoma's play Nidhi. He received State Award in 1978 and 6 other state level awards for the stage play Rasna.

Aravindan started his film career with the movie Ente Kunju, but the film was never released. His first movie released was Thalirukal in 1967 in which he acted as a mental patient among many. His first full-fledged role was in the 1968 movie Sindhooram, directed by Balakrishnan, although it is his critically acclaimed performance from the movie Tharavu which gave him the actual mileage. Since then he has acted in over 400 films for 33 years and established his own style which became his trademark. During the initial stages of his career, the Mala-Pappu-Jagathy trio was a guaranteed crowd-puller among Malayalam film audiences. His last film was Noolppaalam, which is yet to be released. He was the president of the AMMA, the association of Malayalam film artistes.

Mala was well known for his different acting techniques which included gestures, vocal variations and his unique laughing style. He was a jovial person who could shoot jokes at any situation. In one interview, Mala remembered once a random guy who came to him and asked him to tell some jokes. during the 1980s, Mala was a really busy artist since he was part of most of the movies doing various comedy roles. He also sang the popular song "Neeyarinjo Melemanathu" along with Mohanlal in the 1985 movie Kandu Kandarinju. His memorable characters are from the movies Bhoothakannadi, Sallapam, Thaaravu, Mimics Parade, Kanmadam, Joker, Meesha Madhavan etc. In the late 1990s, when the mimicry trend took over Malayalam Cinema, there were movies like Moonu Kodiyum Munnooru Pavanum and Mimics Super 1000, which featured full-fledged spoof characters imitating Mala Aravindan by various mimicry artists. Mala was a great fan of actor Nagesh and his acting style was greatly influenced by Nagesh.

== Personal life ==
Aravindan is married to Geetha on 2 February 1971, after five years of dating. Geetha is a Christian, and was previously named Anna before changing her name. The couple has two children, Kishore (Muthu) and Kala. Kishore is married to Deepthi, and they have a son, Vedavyasan, and two daughters, Varalakshmi and Urvi. Kala is married to Surendran, and they have two children, Vishnu and Devi.

== Death ==
Mala Aravindan was admitted to Kovai Medical Centre Hospital in Coimbatore on 19 January 2015, following a massive heart attack and was shifted to the ICU on 24 January, where he was diagnosed with diffused block. He was on ventilator support. The actor had earlier undergone an angiogram after being hospitalized. He died on 28 January 2015 at 6:30 AM, just five days short of his 44th wedding anniversary. He was 76. He is survived by his wife, children and grandchildren.

== Awards ==
- 2013 : Kerala Film Critics Association Awards - Chalachitra Prathiba Puraskar
- Kerala Sangeeta Nataka Akademi Award for Best Actor - Nidhi (Suryasoma Theatres)

== Filmography ==
=== 1960s ===
Year	Title	Role	Notes
1967	Thalirukal		Uncredited role
1967	Pathirapattu		Uncredited role
1968	Thokkukal Kadha Parayunnu		

=== 1970s ===
Year	Title	Role	Notes
1970	Madhuvidhu		
1970	Olavum Theeravum		
1976	Sindooram		
1976	Madhuram Thirumadhuram	Vakeel	
1978	Samayamaayilla Polum	KK Kanichukulangara	
1978	Madhurikkunna Rathri		
1979	Kannukal	Kuruppu	
1979	Agnivyooham		
1979	Angakkuri		
1979	Aavesham	Thirumeni	

=== 1980s ===
Year	Title	Role	Notes
1980	Muthuchippikal	Sadashivan	
1980	Eden Thottam	Rajappan	
1980	Thaliritta Kinakkal		
1980	Chakara	Kochu Pilla	
1980	Arangum Aniyarayum	Ananthan	
1980	Deepam	Subrahmanyam	
1980	Adhikaram	Appukuttan	
1980	Kaavalmaadam	Rappai	
1980	Daaliya Pookkal		
1981	Oru Vilippadakale		
1981	Dwandha Yudham	S.I. Kuttapu	
1981	Thakilu Kottampuram	Vasu	
1981	Itha Oru Dhikkari	Kumar	
1981	Avatharam	Parasahayam Thankappan	
1981	Sphodanam	Vasu Pilla	
1981	Thaaraavu	Thanki	
1981	Raktham	Kuttappan	
1981	Thadavara	Karnan	
1981	Sambhavam		
1981	Arayannam	Antony	
1981	Vayal	Naanu Nair	
1981	Sphodanam	Vasu Pilla	
1981	Swapnaraagam		
1981	Greeshmajwala	Nair	
1981	Aarathi	Damu	
1981	Ariyappedatha Rahasyam	Gopi	
1982	Kolakomban		
1982	Komaram		
1982	Ethiralikal	Pareed	
1982	Mylanchi	Moosa	
1982	Kakka		
1982	Pooviriyum Pulari		
1983	Coolie		
1983	Nizhal Moodiya Nirangal	Kuruppu	
1983	Kolakomban		
1983	Maniyara	Moideenkutty	
1983	Thaavalam	Vaasu	
1983	Rathilayam	Lonappan	
1983	Ee Yugam		
1983	Mazhanilavu	Mathukutty	
1983	Pourasham	Tomy	
1983	Aana	Thomas	
1983	Belt Mathai	Kuttan Pilla	
1984	Sreekrishna Parunthu	Shankushar	
1984	Vepraalam	Jolly John	
1984	Theere Pratheekshikkathe	Karunan	
1984	Ethirppukal	Ayyappan	
1984	Velichamillatha Veethikal		
1984	Pavam Krooran	Mathulan	
1984	NH 47	PC Velu Pilla	
1984	Kadamattathachan	Ithappiri	
1984	Kaliyil Alpam Karyam	Driver Shankarankutty	
1984	Swantham Sarika		
1984	Poochakkoru Mookkuthi	"Shakthi" Raghavan Pillai	
1984	Vanitha Police		
1984	Manithali	Subaid	
1984	Koottinilamkili	Govinda Pilla	
1984	Thathamme Poocha Poocha	Balaraman	
1985	Shathru	Thamarakshan/Kottada Vasu	
1985	Saandham Bheekaram		
1985	Akalathe Ambili		
1985	Black Mail	Manikyam	
1985	Scene No. 7	Pankan Pilla	
1985	Oru Kudakeezhil	Pushpangathan	
1985	Akkachide Kunjuvava		
1985	Maniyara		
1985	Kandu Kandarinju	Kittan	
1985	Oru Nokku Kanan	Vidyadharan Mashu	
1985	Makan Ente Makan	Vasudevan	
1985	Akkare Ninnoru Maran	Raghavan	
1985	Koodum Thedi	Vasu	
1985	Premalekhanam	Kunchan	
1985	Vellarikka Pattanam		
1985	Upahaaram	Sundareshan	
1986	Ninnistham Ennishtam	Chakrapani	
1986	Love Story	Krishnankutty	
1986	Akalangalil		
1986	Oru Yugasandhya	Kuttappan	
1986	Ithramathram	Augustine	
1986	Katturumbinum Kathu Kuthu	Johnny	
1986	Ponnum Kudathinum Pottu	Ayyappan	
1986	Rareeram	Aravindakshan	
1986	Ice Cream	Worker	
1986	Padayani	Ramu	
1986	Veendum	Driver Sreekar	
1986	Snehamulla Simham	Kuttan	
1986	Atham Chithira Chothi	Pushkaran	
1986	Prathyekam Sradhikkukka	Detective Veerabhadran	
1986	Moonnu Masangalku Mumbu	Ranjan	
1986	Aalorungi Arangorungi	Mathunni/Chakkunni	
1986	Shyama	Appukuttan	
1986	Geetham	Bose	
1986	Adukkan Entheluppam	Markose	
1986	Kshamichu Ennoru Vakku	Panikkar	
1986	Ente Entethu Mathrem	Sathyasheelan	
1986	Nyayavidhi	Mathunni	
1986	Ennu Nathante Nimmi	Sayipp	
1986	Naale Njangalude Vivaham	Mathachan	
1986	Kunjattakilikal	Panikkar	
1986	Oppam Oppathinoppam	Neelakandan	
1986	Pappan Priyappetta Pappan		
1986	Revathikkoru Pavakkutty	Vaidyar Rarichan Nair	
1987	Manja Manthrangal	Raghavan	
1987	Kalam Mari Katha Mari	Koya	
1987	Athinumappuram		
1987	Kottum Kuravayum		
1987	Mangalya Charthu	Pappan	
1987	Ivare Sookshikkuka		
1987	Oru Sindoora Pottinte Ormaykku		
1987	Agni Muhurtham	Balan	
1987	Nirabhedangal	Krishan	
1987	Swargam		
1988	Ulsavapittennu	Postman Pisharody	
1988	Janmandharam	Karunan	
1988	Loose Loose Arappiri Loose	Mala	
1988	Onninu Purake Mattonnu	Appu	
1988	Unnikrishnante Adyathe Christmas	Swamy	
1988	Sanghunadam	Danger Thankapan	
1988	Athirthikal	Velayudhan	
1988	Moonnam Mura	Bus Driver	
1988	Kandathum Kettathum	Sadananthan	
1988	Pattanapravesham	Damu	
1989	V.I.P.	Kuttoos	
1989	Agnichirakulla Moham	Govindan	
1989	Prabhatham Chuvanna Theruvil		
1989	Annakutty Kodambakkam Vilikkunnu	Maducakkuzhi Achan	
1989	Ammavanu Pattiya Amali	Thomson	
1989	Kodugallur Bhagavathi		
1989	Jeevitham Oru Ragam		
1989	Carnival	Govindan	
1989	Mahayanam	Govindankutty	
1989	Puthiya Karukkal	Rajappan	
1989	Indhanam		

=== 1990s ===
Year	Title	Role	Notes
1990	Kottayam Kunjachan	Anthru	
1990	Mukham	Agasthy	
1990	Enquiry		
1990	Ponnaranjanam	Ayyappan	
1991	Georgootty C/O Georgootty	Drama Artist	
1991	Kalamorukkam		
1991	Daivasahayam Lucky Centre		
1991	Mookilla Rajyathu	Ameen	
1991	Kadinjool Kalyanam		
1991	Mahassar	Shivadasan	
1991	Kalari		
1991	Uncle Bun	Mathai	
1991	Amina Tailors	Jabbar	
1991	Agninilavu		
1991	May Dinam	Coach Warrier	
1991	Keli	Commentator	
1991	Neelagiri		
1991	Ganamela	Appukuttan	
1991	Mimics Parade	Mammooty	
1991	Kizhakkunarum Pakshi	Nanappan	
1991	Sandesam	SI Aanandan	
1992	Mr & Mrs		
1992	Kasargod Khader Bhai	Mammooty	
1992	Congratulations Miss Anitha Menon	Achu	
1992	Neelakurukkan		
1992	Maanyanmar	Professional killer	
1992	Oru Swapnam Pole		
1992	Poochakkaru Mani Kettum	Venukuttan	
1992	Welcome to Kodaikanal	Eradi	
1992	First Bell		
1992	Simhadhwani		
1992	Ezhara Ponnana	Anthappan	
1992	Ente Ponnu Thampuran	Ravunni	
1992	Ayalathe Adheham	Selvam	
1992	Annu Good Friday		
1992	Kallan Kappalil Thanne	Appunni Mashu	
1992	Kizhakkan Pathrose	Church Priest	
1992	Maanthrika Cheppu		
1992	Utsavamelam		
1993	City Police		
1993	Pravachakan	Velandi	
1993	Kanyakumariyil Oru Kavitha		
1993	Uppukandam Brothers		
1993	Sowbhagyam	Karunan	
1993	Venkalam	Ayyappan	
1993	Jackpot	Doctor	
1993	Koushalam	Priest	
1993	Sarovaram		
1993	Addeham Enna Iddeham	Head Constable Kunjeesho	
1993	Vakkeel Vasudev	Narayanan	
1993	Aagneyam	Sukumaran Pillai	
1993	Customs Diary	Skariachan	
1993	Ponnuchami		
1994	Varanamalyam	Mathai	
1994	Kadal	Lasar	
1994	Kambolam	Kochappy	
1994	Dollar	Vettukili Damodharan	
1994	Gothram		
1994	Varaphalam	Adv. Arunkumar	
1994	Manathe Kottaram	Kumaran	
1994	Pingami	Velichappadu	
1994	Vadhu Doctoranu	Chinnappan	
1995	Oru Abhibhashakante Case Diary	Kuttan	
1995	Agnidevan	Vijayan	
1995	Special Squad	Kochaugasthy	
1995	Kokkarakko		
1995	Mazhavilkoodaram	Subair's father	
1995	Puthukottyile Puthu Manavalan		
1995	Punnaram		
1996	Kinnam Katta Kallan	Constable Mathew Joseph	
1996	Excuse Me Ethu Collegila		
1996	Harbour		
1996	King Solomon		
1996	Dominic Presentation	Father Joseph Medayil	
1996	Saamoohyapaadam	Pushpangathan	
1996	Sallapam	Kunjookuttan Ashaari	
1996	Sathyabhamakkoru Premalekhanam	Koduval Prakasan	
1996	Mimics Action 500	Kurup	
1997	Kudamattam		
1997	Shobanam		
1997	Poomarathanalil	Ambujakshan	
1997	Kaduva Thoma	D'Cruz	
1997	Snehadoothu	Veeramani	
1997	Anjarakalyanam		
1997	Bhoothakkannadi		
1997	Ekkareyanente Manasam	Sudhakaran	
1997	Gajaraja Manthram		
1997	Sammanam	Ramashan	
1997	Junior Mandrake	Maniyan Vaidhyan	
1997	Hitler Brothers	Ramankutty	
1997	Arjunan Pillayum Anchu Makkalum	Parameswaran	
1997	Kaliyoonjal	Paraman	
1997	Kalyana Unnikal		
1998	Manthri Maalikayil Manasammatham		
1998	Thirakalkkappuram		
1998	Kulirkattu		
1998	Thattakam		
1998	Panchaloham	Karutha	
1998	Kanmadam	Swami Velayudhan	
1998	Magician Mahendralal from Delhi	Mammad	
1999	Charlie Chaplin	Driver Achu	
1999	Aayiram Meni	Sankaran	

=== 2000s ===
Year	Title	Role	Notes
2000	Mark Antony	C.K. Ayyappan	
2000	Ival Draupadi	Ravunni	
2000	Madhuranombarakattu	Abdulla	
2000	Joker	Kumarettan	
2000	Kochu Kochu Santhoshangal	Sankaran	
2000	Rapid Action Force	Jail warden	
2000	Varnakkazhchakal	Chathutti	
2001	Ennum Sambavami Yuge Yuge		
2001	Chithrathoonukal		
2001	Kakki Nakshithrem	Sreedharan	
2001	Pranayakalathu		
2001	Thenthuli		
2001	Kabani		
2001	Karumadikkuttan	Aashan	
2001	Unnathangalil	Joseph	
2001	Bhadra		
2001	Andolanam		
2002	Ee Bhargaveenilayam		
2002	Grandmother		
2002	Swaraga Ganga		
2002	Swapnahalliyil Oru Naal		
2002	Suvarna Mohangal		
2002	Desam	Marthandan	
2002	Aala		
2002	Kattuchembakam	Kattumooppan	
2002	Puthooramputhri Unniyarcha	Paanan	
2002	Meesha Madhavan	Mullani Pappan	
2002	Jagathy Jagadeesh in Town	Kallan Bhaskaran	
2002	Oomappenninu Uriyadappayyan	Mooppan	
2002	Valkannadi	Unnithiri Vaidyar	
2003	Nandanam	Sankaran Mooshari	
2003	Njan Salperu Ramankutty	Qadir	
2003	Chithrathoonukal		
2003	Kaliyodam		
2003	Varum Varunnu Vannu		
2003	Pattalam	Ex-military Gopalan	
2003	Mullavalliyum Thenmavum	Gopalan Nair	
2004	Chitrakoodam	Shankaran Thattan	
2004	Sethurama Iyer CBI	Kuzhivetti Mathai	
2004	Rasikan	Shivankutti's Uncle	
2004	Perumazhakkalam	Kunjikkannan	
2005	Ponmudipuzhayorathu	Thankappan	
2005	OK Chacko Cochin Mumbai	Paramu	
2005	Finger Print		
2005	Chanthupottu	Kanaran	
2005	Kadha		
2006	Moonnamathoral		
2006	Achanteponnu Makkal		
2006	Oruvan	Velu	
2006	Arunam		
2007	Athisayan	Justice Rama Moorthy	
2007	Panthaya Kozhi	Chakrapani	
2008	Chithrasalabhangalude Veedu		
2008	Mizhikal Sakshi	Kadarukutty Musaliar	
2008	Mayabazar	Kumarankutty Ashan	
2008	Thavalam		
2008	Shalabam	Kumaran	
2008	Mulla		
2008	De Ingottu Nokkiye	Cleetus	
2008	Positive		
2008	20	Kurup	
2009	Ee Pattanathil Bhootham	Judge	
2009	Dr. Patient	Thankachan	
2009	Venalmaram	Sankarankutty	
2009	Paribhavam		
2009	Rahasya Police	Pushpan	
2009	Chagathikoottam		
2009	T. D. Dasan Std. VI B	Teacher	

=== 2010s ===
Year	Title	Role	Notes
2010	Swantham Bharya Zindabad	Sakhav ACS	
2010	Again Kasargod Khader Bhai		
2010	Canvas		
2010	Cheriya Kallanum Valiya Policeum	Kunju	
2010	9 KK Road	S.I. Mathukkutty	
2010	Yakshiyum Njanum	Valmiki	
2010	Nanthuni		
2011	Ninnishtam Ennishtam 2		
2011	Priyappetta Nattukare	Pappan	
2012	Prabhuvinte Makkal		
2012	Thappana		
2013	August Club	Lazer	
2013	Once Upon a Time	Sage	
2013	God for Sale	Velayudan	
2013	Vallatha Pahayan		
2013	KQ	Beeran	
2013	Punyalan Agarbattis	Ayyappan	
2014	Masala Republic	Rappayichan	
2014	Lal Bahadur Shastri	C. P. Damodharan	
2015	Nellikka		Posthumously released
2015	Chaminte Company		Posthumously released
2016	Noolpalam		Posthumously released
2017	Varnyathil Aashanka		Photograph of Mullani Pappan, reprisal from Meesa Madhavan

=== 2020s ===
Year	Title	Role	Notes
2021	Kaalchilambu		Posthumously released

== Television ==
- Mouna Nombaram
- Vallarpadathamma
- Kadamattathu Kathanar
