= Koodikazhcha =

- Official Film Poster
- Directed by: T. S. Suresh Babu
- Screenplay by: Kaloor Dennis
- Produced by: Thomi Kunju
- Starring: Jayaram; Jagadish; Babu Antony; Sukumaran
- Cinematography: J. Williams
- Edited by: K. Sankunni
- Music by: S. P. Venkatesh
- Production company: Udaya Alappuzha
- Distributed by: Maruti Pictures
- Release date: 24 June 1991
- Running time: 102 minutes
- Country: India
- Language: Malayalam

Koodikazhcha (transl. Conference) is a 1991 Indian Malayalam film, directed by T. S. Suresh Babu and produced by Thomi Kunju. The film stars Jayaram, Jagadish, Babu Antony, Sukumaran, Urvashi and Usha in lead roles. The film had musical score by S. P. Venkatesh, with lyrics penned by Bichu Thirumala.

== Plot ==
Alice belongs to a big, but poor family with three sisters, her mechanic father and grandmother. She is working as receptionist in Pulikkattil Financiers. Sunny comes as a broker to this finance company for a vehicle, where he meets Alice. Sunny and Scariah start working for Mathew Pulikkadan as vehicle recovery agents. Sunny likes Alice and Scariah likes her younger sister Annie. Alice's father Mathachan gets accused in a murder investigation and gets arrested. Sunny helps prove his innocence and the whole family feels grateful. Mathachan reveals his past life to Sunny in which he lived happily with his family as a farmer in a village. The live next to a rich, cruel moneylender and his arrogant sons who torture them in various ways, including molesting Mathachans eldest daughter Mollykutty. Finally they had to move to the city. Sunny decides to get justice for this family.

Sunny proposes to Alice but she says she will only settle down after her elder sisters are married off. Sunny finds grooms for her two elder sisters. All four sisters get married. They all move back to the village to reclaim Mathachan's house and property.

== Cast ==
- Jayaram as Sunny
- Jagadish as Scariah
- Sukumaran as Advocate Thommichan
- Babu Antony as Williams
- Babu Namboothiri as Mathachan
- Urvashi as Alice, Mathachan's third daughter
- Usha as Annie, Mathachan's youngest daughter
- Chitra as Mollykutty, Mathachan's eldest daughter
- Adoor Bhavani as Mathachan's mother
- T. R. Omana as Annamma, Mathachan's wife
- Jagathy Sreekumar as Mathew Pulikkadan
- Prathapachandran as Thachampalli Divakara Panikkar
- Shivaji as Gopinatha Panikkar
- Santhosh as Viswanatha Panikkar
- Keerikkadan Jose as 'Mortuary' Karunan
- Kanakalatha as Saraswathi
- K. P. A. C. Sunny as CI Harikumar
- Jagannathan as Eenashu
- Kaduvakulam Antony as Kuriyapilly, the Marriage Broker
