= Aayiram Meni =

- Directed by: I. V. Sasi
- Written by: Reji Mathew
- Produced by: C. Ram Kumar
- Starring: Manoj K. Jayan, Urvashi
- Cinematography: Sree Shankar
- Edited by: Murali Narayanan
- Music by: S. P. Venkatesh
- Production company: Ottappalam Films
- Distributed by: Abhinaya release
- Release date: 1999
- Country: India
- Language: Malayalam

Aayiram Meni is a 1999 Indian Malayalam film, directed by I. V. Sasi, starring Manoj K. Jayan and Urvashi in the lead roles.

== Cast ==
- Manoj K. Jayan as Babuttan
- Divya Unni as Mallika
- Urvashi as Alice
- Lalu Alex as Varkey
- Jagadish as Abdutty
- Ganesh Kumar as Lalichan
- Mala Aravindan as Sankaran
- Captain Raju as Unnithan
- Sai Kumar as Bharathan
- Mini Nair as Varkey's wife
- Tony as Murali
- Maathu as Lakshmi
- Chandni Shaju as Lilly
- Ashokan as Damu
- Sadiq as Keshavan
- Rajan P. Dev as Bhaskaran
- Augustine as Naanu
- Jose Pellissery as Kuriachan
- Bheeman Raghu as Maramadi Mamachan
- Biyon as Appu
- KPAC Ramachandran as Velichappad
- Gayathri as Appu's mother
- Sidha Raj as Police Officer
