= Oru Naal Innoru Naal =

- Directed by: T. S. Suresh Babu
- Written by: A. Sheriff
- Screenplay by: A. Sheriff
- Produced by: Sreevigneswara Films
- Starring: Prem Nazir; Shankar; Shobana; Nedumudi Venu
- Cinematography: C. Ramachandra Menon
- Edited by: G. Murali
- Music by: M. G. Radhakrishnan
- Production company: Sreevigneswara Films
- Distributed by: Sreevigneswara Films
- Release date: 12 September 1985
- Country: India
- Language: Malayalam

Oru Naal Innoru Naal is a 1985 Indian Malayalam-language film, directed by T. S. Suresh Babu and produced by Sreevigneswara Films. The film stars Prem Nazir, Shankar, Shobana and Nedumudi Venu. The film has musical score by M. G. Radhakrishnan.

== Cast ==
- Prem Nazir
- Sukumari
- Shobana
- Nedumudi Venu
- Thikkurissy Sukumaran Nair
- Ratheesh
- Shankar
- Bheeman Raghu
- Jagadish
- Jagannatha Varma
- Jayaprabha
- K. P. Ummer
- Karamana Janardanan Nair
- Poojappura Ravi
- Santhakumari
- Vettoor Purushan
- Gomathi

== Soundtrack ==
The music was composed by M. G. Radhakrishnan with lyrics by Chunakkara Ramankutty.

No.	Song	Singers	Lyrics	Length (m:ss)
1	"Panchavarnnakkili"	M. G. Sreekumar, G. Gadha	Chunakkara Ramankutty	
