= Addeham Enna Iddeham =

- Movie Poster
- Directed by: Viji Thampi
- Written by: J. Pallassery
- Produced by: Siyad Kokker
- Starring: Jagadish; Siddique; Maathu; Sunitha; Raghuvaran
- Cinematography: Vipin Mohan
- Edited by: Sreekar Prasad
- Music by: Johnson
- Release date: 1993
- Country: India
- Language: Malayalam

Addeham Enna Iddeham is a 1993 Malayalam-language action thriller film directed by Viji Thampi, starring Jagadish, Siddique, Maathu, Sunitha, and Raghuvaran in major roles.

== Plot ==
Benny (Siddique), a gangster, is released from prison after five years. He witnesses Joji Pereira (Jagadish) robbing a Tamil-speaking employee (Jagathy Sreekumar) of his money. After a long chase, Benny and Perera crash a stolen auto-rickshaw and Benny gets severely injured. He is taken to an old woman named Margaret (Sukumari) by Pereira. Perera reveals that he robbed the bank employee to afford a surgery for his mentally disturbed sister so that she could lead a normal life. She had lost her sanity after witnessing the death of her fiancé in an accident where he was run over by a heavy vehicle. Meanwhile, Pereira is framed for various crimes by a gang led by another man also named Pereira (Raghuvaran), who is part of the Bombay underworld. This situation confuses both the police and the bank employee. The police end up assaulting many innocent people, mistakenly suspecting them of being Pereira. Meanwhile, the gangster visits the police station disguised as a policeman. Later, the real policeman Vishwanath (Rizabawa arrives from Mumbai which leads to the climax of the movie

== Cast ==
- Jagadish as Josey Pereira
- Siddique as Benny
- Maathu as Nancy, Josey Perera's sister
- Sunitha as Mercy, Josey Perera's friend
- Raghuvaran as Pereira
- Jagathy Sreekumar as Ananthakrishnan Swamy
- Janardhanan as SP Sreekantan Nair
- Innocent as CI Balachandran Nair
- Rajan P. Dev as Unnithan Muthalali
- Vijayaraghavan as Muthu, Unnithan's henchman
- Mala Aravindan as Head Constable Kunjeesho
- Mamukkoya as taxi driver Saidali, Benny and Josey's friend
- Sukumari as Dr. Margaret / Maggie Aunty, Josey Perera's houseowner
- Rizabawa as SP Vishwanath, Mumbai
- Jagannathan as Police Constable Shankaran, Unnithan's ally
- Paravoor Bharathan as Mercy's father
- Ragini as Kamakshi, Swamy's wife
- Sonia as Annie, Benny's wife
- T. P. Madhavan as company manager
- Jagannatha Varma as neurologist Dr. Fernandez
- Manu Varma as Freddy, Nancy's ex-fiancé
- Vinod Kozhikode as Unnithan's henchman
- Rasheed as Unnithan's henchman
- Thrissur Elsy as Sarada, Sreekandan Nair's wife
- Kanakalatha as Saidali's wife
- Thesni Khan as Nurse, Unnithan's ally

== Songs ==
All lyrics are written by Kaithapram; all music is composed by Johnson.

Songs
No.	Title	Singers	Length
1.	"Aathmaanuthaapathin Manivilakke"	Chorus, K. G. Markose
2.	"Priye Priye Vasanthamay"	K. J. Yesudas, Minmini
