= Maanyanmar =

1992 Malayalam crime drama film

- Directed by: T. S. Suresh Babu
- Written by: Dennis Joseph
- Produced by: Plaza
- Starring: Mukesh; Sreenivasan; Jagadeesh; Ramya Krishnan
- Cinematography: Murukeshan
- Edited by: E. Madhavan
- Music by: S. P. Venkatesh
- Production company: Plaza
- Distributed by: Maruthi Pictures Release
- Release date: 31 January 1992
- Running time: 121 min
- Country: India
- Language: Malayalam

Maanyanmaar (transl. Gentlemen) is a 1992 Indian Malayalam-language crime drama film directed by T. S. Suresh Babu and written by Dennis Joseph. The plot revolves around two petty thieves who are on a run after being released on parole for a week. It features Mukesh, Sreenivasan, Jagadeesh, Ramya Krishnan, Jagathi Sreekumar, Rajan P. Dev and Vijayaraghavan.

== Plot ==
Thomas, alias Thorappan Thoma and Pathira Thankappan are two petty thieves working under Kottayam Kochunni, a notorious thief wanted by police. One day, to financially support Athapady Anthru, his master, Kochunni plans a big robbery at a hotel suite along with his henchmen. On the same day, three young sons of Vikraman, a mafia don arrives in Kochi. K. R., his business rival, plans to shoot down the children of Vikraman on same night at their hotel suite. But after getting the news, they wait for the killer to enter their room, heavily armed. Both Thorappan Thoma and Pathira Thankappan enter the same suite, and are attacked by them. In a bid to escape, both fight back. The commotion leads to chaos and police arrive. Thoma and Thankappan are tried for attempting to kill the sons of Vikraman and are sentenced to three years in jail. Kochunni and Andru escape from the scene.

Two years after the incident, Thankappan gets parole and absconds. Thoma is granted parole, but has been assigned to find out Thankappan in one week. Kochunni now runs an automobile shop, where Andru is a worker under him. Thoma arrives at Kochunni's shop in search of money. He is assigned to hand over a car at Chennai. Unknowing that the car belongs to the same Vikraman, Thoma sets out for Chennai. In the meantime, the elder son of Vikraman is shot dead by K. R. Vikraman suspects Thoma for this, who is now in Chennai. Accidentally, he happens to meet Thankappan, who is now married and is living under a new name, Shambhu Iyer. Both Thankappan and Thoma are now on the run from police and Vikraman. The chase and fight to prove their innocence forms the rest of the story.

== Cast ==
- Mukesh as Thomas / Thorappan Thoma
- Sreenivasan as Pathira Thankappan / Shambhu Iyer
- Jagadish as Circle Inspector Vincent D'Souza
- Ramya Krishnan as Radhika, Thomas's lover
- Jagathy Sreekumar as Kottayam Kochunni
- Mamukkoya as Athappadi Anthru
- Rajan P. Dev as Vikraman
- Prathapachandran as K. R.
- Vijayaraghavan as Vikraman's elder son
- Santhosh as Vikraman's second son
- K. B. Ganesh Kumar as Vikraman's third son
- Mala Aravindan as professional killer
- Suvarna Mathew as Thomas's sister
- Poojappura Ravi as Shambhu Iyer's father-in-law
- Sharmili as Shambhu Iyer's wife
- Vinu Chakravarthy as Sub inspector of police, Tamil Nadu
- N. L. Balakrishnan as Radhika's father
- James as K. R.'s driver
- Narayanankutty as police constable
- Mafia Sasi as Goonda
- Rajith Kumar as hospital attender

== Soundtrack ==
No.	Title	Singer(s)	Length
1.	"Aakasham"	M. G. Sreekumar	3:58
2.	"Neekatha Dhaham"	Mano, K. S. Chithra	4:32
3.	"Vrindavanam"	K. G. Markose	4:14
