= Aadhyamayi =

- Directed by: Joseph Vattoli
- Music by: S. P. Venkatesh
- Release date: 1991
- Country: India
- Language: Malayalam

Aadhyamayi is a 1991 Indian Malayalam film, directed by Joseph Vattoli. The film has musical score by S. P. Venkatesh.

== Soundtrack ==
The music was composed by S. P. Venkatesh and the lyrics were written by Varkala Sreekumar.

No.	Song	Singers	Lyrics	Length (m:ss)
1	"Aalilathoniyumaay"	Unni Menon	Varkala Sreekumar	
2	"Aalilathoniyumaay" (F)	Sujatha Mohan	Varkala Sreekumar	
