= Prayikkara Pappan =

- Directed by: T. S. Suresh Babu
- Written by: Shaji Pandavath
- Starring: Murali; Madhu; Jagadish; Bheeman Raghu; Sukumaran; Geetha; Chippy; Surendra Pal
- Cinematography: Dinesh Babu
- Edited by: K. Sankunni
- Music by: S. P. Venkatesh
- Production company: SKB Films Combines
- Distributed by: SKB Films Combines
- Release date: 7 April 1995
- Country: India
- Language: Malayalam

Prayikkara Pappan is a 1995 Indian Malayalam-language action drama film directed by T. S. Suresh Babu and written by Shaji Pandavath. The film stars Murali, Madhu, Jagadish, Bheeman Raghu, Sukumaran, Raghavan, Geetha, Chippy and Surendra Pal. The film's score was composed by S. P. Venkatesh.

== Plot ==
Achutanan, a man, who arranged to help Sivan, a protege of his mentor, Shankunni Moopan while searching his parents' murderers.

== Cast ==
- Murali as Achuthan / Prayikkara Pappan
- Madhu as Shankunni Moopan
- Jagadish as Shivan
- Bheeman Raghu as Parunthu Vavachan
- Sukumaran as DFO James Antony
- Geetha as Gauri
- Chippy as Radha
- Raghavan as Kanaran
- Surendra Pal as Pazhani Thekkan, The main antagonist
- Vijayakumar as Chandran
- Kuthiravattam Pappu as Ponnaran
- Mamukkoya as Veerappan
- K. B. Ganesh Kumar as Thomas
- Indrans as Vettukili
- Aliyar as Alavikutty
- Chithra as Sarasu, Achuthan's Mother
- Kollam Thulasi as Kannappan, Politician
- Kanakalatha
- Sabnam
- Santhakumari as Gouris's mother
- Meghanathan as Ramankutty, Gunda
- Abu Salim as Hassan, Gunda
- Ponnambalam as Pazhani's Henchmen
- Sonia as Katthu
- Kaladi Jayan as Pavithran
- Kaladi Omana as Thomas's mother
- Kumarakam Raghunath as Sreedharan, Achuthan's father

== Production ==
T. S. Suresh Babu had Mohanlal in mind for the role of Prayikkara Pappan, but as writer Shaji Pandavath had already talked with Murali who was interested in playing the part, he was cast.

== Soundtrack ==
The music was composed by S. P. Venkatesh with lyrics by Bichu Thirumala.

No.	Song	Singers	Lyrics	Length (m:ss)
1	"Kokkum Poonchirakum"	K. S. Chithra, Jagadish	Bichu Thirumala	
2	"Kombukuzhal"	P. Jayachandran, M. G. Sreekumar	Bichu Thirumala	
3	"Naagaveena Meeti"	M. G. Sreekumar	Bichu Thirumala	
