= Sooryaputhran =

- Theatrical release poster
- Directed by: Thulasidas
- Written by: A. K. Sajan; A. K. Santhosh
- Produced by: C. G Babu; C. G Praveen; Nalini Sreekumar; Dr. C. G Rajeev
- Starring: Jayaram; Divyaa Unni; Narendra Prasad
- Cinematography: Uthpal V. Nayanar
- Music by: Ouseppachan
- Production company: Ganga Productions
- Release date: 1998
- Country: India
- Language: Malayalam

Sooryaputhran is a 1998 Indian Malayalam-language action comedy-drama film directed by Thulasidas, starring Jayaram and Divyaa Unni in the lead roles.

== Plot ==
Jeevan is an orphan and a self-made estate owner in Ooty leading a bachelor life. He aspires to have a family for himself and decides to adopt a child; however the Father who runs the orphanage is against giving the child to a bachelor. His friend, Shatrughnan , lies to Father about Jeevan having a wife, whom Father demands to see. In an unexpected turn of events, they encounter Hema who agrees to act as his wife. The rest of the story captures the mystery behind Hema and their life.

== Cast ==
- Jayaram as Jeevan
- Divya Unni as Hema / Maadhuri Jeevan
- Pownish Krishna P as Orphan Child
- Jagadish as Shatrughnan
- Innocent as Paulose
- Jayabharathi as Bharathi, Hema's Mother
- Narendra Prasad as Mangalathu Padipurackel Jagannadhan
- Mohan Raj as Narendran
- Murali as Father Vettilakkaden
- Kalpana as Mental Patient
- KPAC Lalitha as Kunjeley
- Darshana
- Devan as Deva Varma
- Cochin Haneefa as Chekanoor Neelakantan Karthavu
- Jagathy Sreekumar as Sub Inspector Thambanoor Thamban
- TP Madhavan as Vilwamanglam Thirumeni

== Soundtrack ==
The film's soundtrack contains 7 songs, all composed by Ouseppachan, with lyrics by S. Ramesan Nair.

#	Title	Singer(s)
1	"Kaliyoonjaalaadiyethum"	M. G. Sreekumar, Chorus
2	"Koodariya Kuyilamme Koode Poroo Nee" [M]	K. J. Yesudas
3	"Koodariya Kuyilamme Koode Poroo Nee" [D]	K. J. Yesudas, Sujatha Mohan
4	"Panchavarnnakkulire Paalaazhikkadavil"	K. J. Yesudas, K.S. Chitra
5	"Megha Hamsangal Doothu Poyvarum"	Sudeep Kumar
6	"Thenmalare" [D]	K. S. Chitra, Franco
7	"Thenmalare" [M]	K. J. Yesudas
