= Stalin Sivadas =

- Directed by: T. S. Suresh Babu
- Written by: T. Damodaran
- Produced by: Dinesh Panicker
- Starring: Mammootty; Madhu; Jagadish
- Cinematography: Sanjeev Shankar
- Edited by: A. Sreekar Prasad
- Music by: M. G. Radhakrishnan, Sharath
- Distributed by: Rohit Films
- Release date: 12 March 1999
- Running time: 118 minutes
- Country: India
- Language: Malayalam

Stalin Sivadas is a 1999 Malayalam political conspiracy crime film, directed by T. S. Suresh Babu and written by T. Damodaran. The film stars Mammootty in title role with, Madhu and Jagadish playing other supporting roles. The film was released alongside Pathram. The film was a commercial failure.

== Plot ==
A story about communist party's and BJS's political violence in Kerala and its roots as influences of foreign conspirators like Moral Re-Armament.

== Cast ==
- Mammootty as Siva alias Stalin Sivadas
- Madhu as Chief Minister Krishnan Nair
- Jagadish as Vishwam
- Captain Raju as Contractor Narendran
- Nedumudi Venu as CG
- Khushbu as Dr.Manju
- N. F. Varghese as Anandan
- Sai Kumar as Commissioner Sarathchandran IPS
- Shankar as BSS loyalist Jayachandran, Sivadas' brother-in-law
- Maniyanpilla Raju as Mayor Anto
- Babu Namboothiri as Madhavan Nair
- Sreejaya Nair as Indu Jayachandran, Sivadas's sister
- Kozhikode Narayanan Nair as Party Veteran Leader Luckose
- Chandni Shaju as Ammini
- Anil Murali as Xavier
- Abu Salim as Keshu
- Ponnambalam as Bomber
- Madhupal as Sukumaran
- James as Sugunan
- Jagannathan as Keshavan Pillai
- KPAC Azeez as Interviewer DD
- Kaladi Omana as Sharada
- Shivaji as SI Thankachan
- Kanakalatha as Sarahemma
- Poojappura Ravi as Leader's PA Nambiar
- Yamuna as Sreekala Menon
- Ravi Vallathol as Manoj
- T. P. Madhavan as Harindran, Leader
- Kottayam Shantha as Lakshmi, Manju's mother
- Keerikkadan Jose as Bhadran, BSS Leader
- N. N. Ilayathu as Nithyananda Swami
- Aliyar as Divakaran
- Suresh Gopi as Manju's Brother (Photo Archieve)

== Soundtrack ==
- Rakthavarnna Kodi Pongi - sung by K. J. Yesudas
- Lyrics and Music : M.G. Radhakrishnan
