= Ponnum Kudathinum Pottu =

Ponnum Kudthinu Pottu
- Directed by: T. S. Suresh Babu
- Written by: Jagadish; Sreenivasan (dialogues)
- Screenplay by: Sreenivasan
- Produced by: M. Mani
- Starring: Jagathy Sreekumar; Nedumudi Venu; Shankar; Menaka
- Cinematography: C. E. Babu
- Edited by: V. P. Krishnan
- Music by: Shyam
- Production company: Sunitha Productions
- Distributed by: Sunitha Productions
- Release date: 17 October 1986
- Country: India
- Language: Malayalam

Ponnum Kudthinu Pottu is a 1986 Indian Malayalam-language film, directed by T. S. Suresh Babu and produced by M. Mani. The film stars Jagathy Sreekumar, Nedumudi Venu, Shankar and Menaka. The film's score was composed by Shyam.

== Plot ==
Eravi Pillai tries to sell his old house but no one is interested in it and he tries to transfer it to anyone willing. Later he finds out that there is a treasure hidden in the house buried by his ancestors, and he tries to reclaim the house for the treasure.

== Cast ==
- Jagathy Sreekumar as Eraviraman Pillai
- Nedumudi Venu as Dasan
- Shankar as Gopan
- Menaka as Sethubhai
- Mukesh as College student
- Jagadish as College student
- Maniyanpilla Raju as College student
- Innocent as Chandu Panikker
- Mala Aravindan as Ayyappan
- Kuthiravattom Pappu as Ganikan
- Poojappura Ravi as Thoma
- V. D. Rajappan as Raghavan
- Rohini as Rani
- Thikkurussy as Kunjiraman
- Lalithasree as Jaanu
- Paravoor Bharathan as Principal
- Thodupuzha Vasanthy as Karthyayani
- Kollam Ajith as Gunda
- Poojappura Radhakrishnan as Abutty
- Vishnuprakash as Gunda

== Soundtrack ==
The music was composed by Shyam with lyrics by Chunakkara Ramankutty.

No.	Song	Singers	Lyrics	Length (m:ss)
1	"Ee Raavilo"	Arundhathi	Chunakkara Ramankutty	
2	"Hemanthamaay Ee Vediyil"	K. J. Yesudas	Chunakkara Ramankutty	
