= Ennum Nanmakal =

- Directed by: Sathyan Anthikkadu
- Written by: Raghunath Paleri
- Produced by: P. V. Gangadharan
- Starring: Sreenivasan; Jayaram; Santhi Krishna
- Edited by: K.Rajagopal
- Music by: Composer: Johnson; Lyrics: Kaithapram Damodaran Namboothiri
- Production company: Grihalakshmi Productions
- Release date: 1991
- Country: India
- Language: Malayalam

Ennum Nanmakal is a 1991 Malayalam film directed by Sathyan Anthikkadu and written by Raghunath Paleri. It stars Sreenivasan, Jayaram, Santhi Krishna, in the lead roles, along with Shari, Saranya Ponvannan, KPAC Lalitha, Innocent, Sankaradi, Oduvil Unnikrishnan, Jagadeesh, and Mamukkoya in other pivotal roles.

== Plot ==
Radha Devi is an office assistant working in the city of Kozhikode. She is in love with the unemployed Sivan. Radha Devi moves to Satyavathiyamma's home as a paying guest along with two friends, Indu and Rama. Indu is the head of the housekeeping staff in a hotel; Rama is an associate editor of a magazine and is a feminist. They meet the irascible Dr. Aniruddhan, a widower with a baby girl.

Many comical scenes follow with characters including the local postman Ulpalakshan, a local politician Thotta MLA and compounder Khader. Meanwhile, Sivan suffers due to unemployment and financial difficulties. His self-esteem is questioned by his sister-in-law Devaki and Radha's uncle.

The plot thickens, with Sivan forced to break up with Radha by Radha's uncle and mother as he is unemployed. Later Radha becomes close to Dr. Aniruddhan's baby daughter. Seeing her affection to the kid, Dr.Aniruddhan proposes Radha Devi. Meanwhile, Sivan comes back to meet Radha Devi at Kozhikode with the news that he has secured a job in a company in Calcutta. Brokenhearted, Radha Devi reveals that she has decided to marry Aniruddhan and the marriage is going to be held at a registrar's office in several days' time. Sivan accepts this and leaves, promising to come for the marriage. On the day of marriage, Aniruddhan surprises Radha Devi and Sivan by announcing that he has realized the relationship between Radha and Sivan and the reasons behind their break-up, and that it was them both that should get married that day. Aniruddhan had even arranged Radha's mother and uncle to come there to attend the marriage. Aniruddhan leaves with his child. Sivan and Radha marry.

== Cast ==
- Sreenivasan as Dr. Anirudhan
- Jayaram as Sivan
- Santhi Krishna as Radha Devi
- Shari as Rama
- Saranya Ponvannan as Indu
- KPAC Lalitha as PK Satyavathiyamma
- Innocent as Vishwanathan (Thotta MLA)
- Sukumari as Radha's Amma
- Sankaradi as Gopinathan Nair(Radha's uncle)
- Oduvil Unnikrishnan as Balan
- Mamukkoya as Compounder Khader
- Jagadeesh as Ulpalakshan
- Kanakalatha as Devaki
- Thezni Khan as Sharada
- Paravoor Bharathan as Velandi
- Philomina as Bhairavi
- Krishnankutty Nair as Pazhaniyandi
- Bobby Kottarakkara as Ramachandran
- Kaladi Omana As Hostel Matron
- Rajan Padoor as Conductor
- K. T. C. Abdullah as Patient

== Soundtrack ==
Ennum Nanmakal

Soundtrack album by Johnson
- Genre: Film
- Language: Malayalam

The film features songs composed by Johnson and written by Kaithapram.

Track	Song title	Singer(s)
1	"Ekaakiyaay"	K. J. Yesudas
2	"Kilukilukkampetty"	K. J. Yesudas
3	"Thaaraaganangalkku Thaze"	K. J. Yesudas
4	"Thaaraaganangalkku Thaze"	K. S. Chithra
