= Sanghunadam =

1981 Malayalam film directed by T. S. Suresh Babu

- Theatrical release poster
- Directed by: T. S. Suresh Babu
- Written by: Pappanamkodu Lakshmanan
- Screenplay by: Pappanamkodu Lakshmanan
- Produced by: Harinarayanan
- Starring: Mammootty; Nalini; Ratheesh
- Cinematography: C. Ramachandra Menon
- Edited by: V. P. Krishnan
- Music by: Jerry Amaldev
- Production companies: Ragasudha Films; Samraaj Films
- Distributed by: Ragasudha Films
- Release date: 20 March 1988
- Country: India
- Language: Malayalam

Sanghunadam (transl. Sound of Conch Shell) is a 1988 Indian Malayalam-language drama film, directed by T. S. Suresh Babu, written by Pappanamkodu Lakshmanan and produced by Harinarayanan under the banner of Ragasudha Films in their debut production. The film stars Mammootty in the lead role, alongside Ratheesh, Nalini, Suresh Gopi, Nedumudi Venu, and Rohini in supporting roles. The film features original songs composed by Jerry Amaldev. This is one of the few films where Innocent plays a negative role.

== Plot ==
Sudhakaran is a well known public prosecutor, who lives with his family consisting of his wife Sulochana, his brother Rajeevan and his daughter. DySP Mohandas is a trusted friend of Sudhakaran. Thampi is a rich businessman who has a lot of connections at the top. Sudhakaran goes to thank Thampi who was responsible for Rajeev to get a job. Thampi lives with his son Vinod and daughter-in-law, Renuka, who is Mohandas' sister. Thampi also has a trusted friend, Dr. Issac John.

One day, when Sudhakaran and Sulochana were out shopping, they saw Rajeevan in a bike along with a girl. It is revealed that the girl is Thulasi, his lover. Sulochana goes to meet Thulasi's family for fixing Rajeevan's marriage. There it is revealed that Thulasi has a brother, Chandran who is jailed for killing a person. This is not a problem for Rajeevan's family and their marriage is fixed. However, it is revealed that the person Chandran killed was non other than Thampi's son. But, they are still ready for the marriage despite threats from Thampi.

Chandran escapes from jail to request Sudhakaran to continue with the marriage proposal. However, that night Thampi's son, Vinod and daughter-in-law, Renuka is found dead under mysterious circumstances. All the evidences point to Chandran as the murderer. The film then revolves around bringing the real perpetuators to justice.

== Cast ==
- Mammootty as Chandran
- Ratheesh as Sudhakaran
- Nalini as Sulochana
- Suresh Gopi as Rajeevan
- Nedumudi Venu as DYSP Mohandas
- Rohini as Thulasi
- K. P. Ummer as Thampi
- Mala Aravindan as Danger Thankapan
- Ramu as Rameshan
- Innocent as Dr Issac John
- Maniyanpilla Raju as Vinod
- Adoor Bhavani as Thulasi's and Chandran's mother
- Jagathy Sreekumar as Sankaran Nair
- Jagadish as SI Rajappan Achari
- Jagannatha Varma as Judge
- KPAC Sunny as Adv Balachandran
- Kollam Ajith as Gunda
- Uma as Renuka
- Vettoor Purushan as Jail inmate

== Soundtrack ==
The music was composed by Jerry Amaldev and the lyrics were written by Rappal Sukumara Menon.

| No. | Title | Singer(s) | Length |
|---|---|---|---|
| 1. | "Mandaarakkaattil" | K. J. Yesudas |
| 2. | "Neeradakomala" | K. J. Yesudas |
| 3. | "Varu Varu Kanmani" | K. J. Yesudas |
