= Amina Tailors =

1991 film directed by Sajan

- Poster
- Directed by: Sajan
- Written by: Mani Shornur
- Screenplay by: Mani Shornur
- Produced by: Ramakrishnan
- Starring: Innocent; Ashokan; Sankaradi; Shubha
- Cinematography: Vasanth Kumar
- Edited by: K. P. Hariharaputhran
- Music by: Raghu Kumar
- Production company: Shyney Films
- Distributed by: Shyney Films
- Release date: 1991
- Country: India
- Language: Malayalam

Amina Tailors is a 1991 Indian Malayalam-language film directed by Sajan and produced by Ramakrishnan. The film stars Ashokan, Rizabawa, Parvathy Jayaram and Rajan P. Dev in the lead roles. The film has musical score by Raghu Kumar.

== Plot ==
The movie is about a tailor who falls love in with a beautiful girl, to which her father, an evil butcher objects to. The movie depicts the value of literacy and shows the ill effects of illiteracy existed in Northern Kerala in the early 1990s.

== Cast ==
- Ashokan as A. Abdul Azeez
- Parvathy as Amina Hydrose
- Rajan P. Dev as Moori Hydrose
- Rizabawa as Nazer
- Jagadish as Manjeri Majeed
- Mamukkoya as Bapputty / Fake Malappuram Moidheen
- Shubha as Pathuma Hydrose
- Innocent as Lonappan Master
- Sankaradi as Nair
- Kuthiravattam Pappu as Kunjalavi
- Mohan Raj as Malappuram Moidheen
- Mala Aravindan as Jabbar
- Mohan Raj as Bapputty
- Paravoor Bharathan as Vasu
- Philomina as Khadeejumma
- Chemanchery Narayanan Nair

== Soundtrack ==
The music was composed by Raghu Kumar and the lyrics were written by Kaithapram.

No.	Song	Singers	Lyrics	Length (m:ss)
1	"Aadimanaadam"	Unni Menon	Kaithapram	
2	"Aey Haseen (Madhuvo)	M. G. Sreekumar	Kaithapram	
3	"Madamkonda Thaarunyame"	K. S. Chithra	Kaithapram	
4	"Medappularipparavakale"	M. G. Sreekumar	Kaithapram	
5	"Neelathaamara"	K. S. Chithra, Unni Menon	Kaithapram	
6	"Swargathe Sulthan" (F)	K. S. Chithra, Chorus	Kaithapram	
7	"Swargathe Sulthan" (M)	M. G. Sreekumar	Kaithapram	
