= Sowbhagyam =

- Directed by: Sandhya Mohan
- Written by: Vindhyan
- Screenplay by: Kaloor Dennis
- Produced by: Thomas Koratty
- Starring: Jagadish, Sunitha
- Cinematography: Radhakrishnan
- Edited by: G murali
- Music by: S. P. Venkatesh
- Production company: Nice movies
- Distributed by: Maruti release
- Release date: 1993
- Country: India
- Language: Malayalam

Sowbhagyam is a 1993 Indian Malayalam film, directed by Sandhya Mohan and starring Sunitha and Jagadish in lead roles.

== Plot ==
Balachandran a casual announcer in All India Radio gets engaged to Indhu, daughter of Narayanan Nair (who is nicknamed "Straightforward", since he always claims to be straightforward). After marriage, things become complicated when a drama artist Rajani accuses Balachandran of raping her.

== Cast ==
- Jagadheesh as Balachadran
- Sunitha as Indhu Balachadran
- Suchitra as Koothattukulam Rajani
- Jagathy Sreekumar as Subramaniyan
- A. C. Zainuddin as Balachandran's colleague
- TR Omana as Balachandran's mother
- Priyanka as Reshmi Menon
- Rajan P. Dev as Narayanan Nair
- Kuthiravattam Pappu as Allamkodu Vasu, who is currently protecting Koothattukulam Rajani as her guardian
- Mala Aravindan as Karunan
- Krishnan Kutty Nair as Nanu Ashan
- Aboobacker as Krishnan
- Bobby Kottarakkara as Uppala Rajappan
- Chithra
- Divya Unni as Indu's sister
- Kanakalatha as Suseela Subramaniyan
- Jose Pallissery as Irijalakuda Neelabaran
- Kanakalatha
- Sathaar as Doctor
- Kaladi Omana
- Narayanankutty Member at the drama troupe

== Soundtrack ==
The film's soundtrack contains 3 songs, all composed by S. P. Venkatesh and Lyrics by Kaithapram.

#	Title	Singer(s)
1	"Nombaraveene"	K. J. Yesudas
2	"Onnuriyaadaan"	K. S. Chitra
3	"Poovani Manchathil"	K. J. Yesudas
