= Vakkeel Vasudev =

- Poster
- Directed by: P. G. Vishwambharan
- Screenplay by: B. Jayachandran
- Story by: Rafeeq
- Produced by: Meena Ashok; C. K. Ashokan
- Starring: Jagadish; Jayaram; Sunitha
- Cinematography: Saroj Padi
- Edited by: K. Sankunni
- Music by: Mohan Sithara
- Production company: Charankattu Productions
- Distributed by: Charankattu Release
- Release date: 1993
- Country: India
- Language: Malayalam

Vakkeel Vasudev (transl. Lawyer Vasudev) is a 1993 Indian Malayalam film, directed by P. G. Vishwambharan, starring Jagadish, Jayaram and Sunitha in the lead roles.

== Plot ==
The movie deals with the consequences of alcoholism in the lives of two individuals belonging to two different sections of the society. Thankappan is a lineman employed with the Kerala Electricity Board. He loves to drink, and his wife doesn't mind his drinking habit as he is a good husband and father. His family consists of his wife and two daughters, Jayasree & Sreedevi. Vasudev is a lawyer who makes a living by fighting accident cases and getting the victim's compensation, out of which he takes a hefty cut. He mainly deals with litigations related to motor accident insurance. He is very successful at what he does and does not hesitate to twist the case in his favor.

Vishnu is an NRI who frequently comes down to his native village, where he has an ancestral home. Mathai is the caretaker of the house, and his nephew Thomaskutty lives with him in Vishnu's house. Vishnu and Thomaskuty become friends, haunting the local bars together, where Vishnu gets drunk daily. Thomas Kutty tries to control Vishnu's drinks but he doesn't listen. On an unfortunate night, an inebriated Vishnu rams his car on a drunk Thankappan. Thomaskutty asks him to leave the accident site and the victim, fearing jail. Vishnu drives away. Later, they hear that Thankappan has died. Thomaskutty tells Vshnu to lock the car in the garage and not take it out till the furor over the accident is over. Vishnu feels very guilty and decides to assist Thankappan's family financially. He visits the family and falls in love with Sridevi. However, Vasudev Vakeel is also interested in Sreedevi and senses competition from Vishnu for her affections. He tries to get rid of Vishnu by getting him arrested for the accident, but some eyewitnesses reveal that Thankappan was killed by another car that belongs to Vasudev. The rest of the story revolves around the happenings that finally reveals the truth behind the accident.

== Cast ==
- Jagadish as Vakkeel Vasudev
- Jayaram as Vishnu
- Sunitha as Sreedevi
- Jagathy Sreekumar as Thomaskutty
- KPAC Lalitha as Bhavani
- Geetha Vijayan as Shobha
- Mala Aravindan as Narayanan
- Mamukkoya as SI Jabbar
- Bobby Kottarakkara as Lambodharan
- Krishnankutty Nair as Current Thankappan
- Rizabawa as Stephen d'Souza
- T. P. Madhavan as Mathai
- Kunchan as Police constable
- Thodupuzha Vasanthy as Janu
- Harishree Ashokan as Vasu
- Baiju as Lalu

== Box office ==
The film was a commercial success.
