= Sharja To Sharja =

2001 film by Venugopan

Sharjah To Sharjah
- Directed by: U.Venugopan
- Written by: A. K. Sajan; A. K. Santhosh
- Starring: Jayaram; Aishwarya; Madhu; Jagadish
- Cinematography: P. Sukumar
- Edited by: G. Murali
- Music by: Mohan Sitara
- Release date: 25 May 2001
- Running time: 160 minutes
- Country: India
- Language: Malayalam

Sharjah to Sharjah is a 2001 Indian Malayalam-language comedy-drama film directed by Venugopan and starring Jayaram, Aishwarya, Madhu, Jagadish. The movie was a commercial success.

== Plot ==
Unnikrishnan Vishwanathan alias Unni leads a happy life in Sharjah along with his friends Kannan and Appu. But things turn topsy-turvy, when Unni gets falsely accused of murdering Kannan. Their sponsor Sheikh Jasim Khalid Al Mubarak Mehbali tells Unni's brother Nandagopal alias Nandan that he can release Unni if he can get a letter from Kannan's family that they have pardoned Unni and all the members of Kannan's family should sign the letter. Nandan goes to Kannan's house disguised as Jasim and tries to fool everyone in signing the letter without telling the truth of the contents of the letter. But later, Nandan realises that Jasim was trying to fool him as well as he has written something else in the letter. How Nandan convinces Kannan's family to get the signatures and how he rescues Unni from the death sentence and Jasim forms the rest of the story.

== Cast ==
- Jayaram as Nandagopal Viswanathan / Sheikh Jasim Khalid Al Mubarak
- M. N. Nambiar as Valiya Kappithan
- Madhu as Justice Viswanathan Kartha, Nandagopal's and Unnikrishnan's father
- Ibrahim Kutty as Sheikh Jasim Khalid Al Mubarak, the main antagonist
- Rajan P. Dev as Karunan Kappithan
- Captain Raju as Kanaran Kappithan
- Ramu as Kumaran Kappithan
- Jagadish as Kuwait Kochunni
- Harisree Ashokan as Mali Kuttappan
- Aishwarya as Kalyani
- Maniyanpilla Raju as Sethu
- Vineeth Kumar as Kannan
- Sudheesh as Unnikrishnan Viswanathan, Nandagopal's younger brother
- Ushakumari as Bhanu
- Keerikkadan Jose
- Nadirshah
- Mamukkoya as Velayudhan
- Bindu Panicker
- Radhika as Ammukutty

== Soundtrack ==
Music: Mohan Sitara, Lyrics: Girish Puthenchery, Shibu Chakravarthy

- "Chandana Thennalai" (F) - K. S. Chitra
- "Chandana Thennalai" (M) - K. J. Yesudas
- "Dee Dee" (Pathinalam Ravinte) (M) - M. G. Sreekumar
- "Dee Dee" (Pathinalam Ravinte) (F) - Smitha
- "Du Du" - M. G. Sreekumar
- "Iniyum" - Gayatri Asokan
- "Mam Manasa" - Radhika Thilak
- "Neelakayalil" - P. Jayachandran
