= Uppukandam Brothers =

1993 Indian film

- Directed by: T. S. Suresh Babu
- Screenplay by: Kaloor Dennis
- Story by: Thommichan Neendoor
- Produced by: Maruthi Pictures
- Starring: Jagadish; Captain Raju; Mohan Raj; Babu Antony; Baiju; Maathu; Geetha; Siddique; Rajan P. Dev; Prathapachandran; Jagathy Sreekumar
- Cinematography: J. Williams
- Edited by: K. Sankunni
- Music by: S. P. Venkatesh
- Distributed by: Maruthi Pictures
- Release date: 5 October 1993
- Running time: 137 min
- Country: India
- Language: Malayalam

Uppukandam Brothers is a 1993 Indian Malayalam-language action film directed by T. S. Suresh Babu and written by Kaloor Dennis from a story by Thommichan Neendoor. It stars Jagadish, Captain Raju, Mohan Raj, Babu Antony, Baiju Santhosh, Geetha, Maathu, Siddique, Rajan P. Dev, Prathapachandran, and Jagathy Sreekumar. The film gave a breakthrough for Babu Antony's career. The background score was composed by S. P. Venkatesh. A sequel, Uppukandam Brothers: Back in Action was released in 2011.

== Plot ==
The story begins with Chacko, a man who unknowingly becomes an informer for Ananthan Pillai, a powerful and influential figure involved in illegal activities. When Ananthan discovers Chacko's betrayal, he brutally murders him.

Heartbroken and seeking justice, Chacko's son turns to the Uppukandam Brothers, consisting of five brothers namely, Kariachan, Sevichan, Paulachan, Josekutty, Thankachan. The Uppukandam brothers, known for their unwavering loyalty and sense of honor, take up the cause as their own.

The film then follows the Uppukandam brothers as they embark on a dangerous mission to bring Ananthan Pillai to justice. Their path is fraught with challenges, as they face numerous obstacles and confrontations with Ananthan's henchmen.

A significant portion of the film is dedicated to showcasing the exceptional courage, humour, family bond and bravery of the Uppukandam brothers. Their actions become legendary, earning them both respect and fear in the community.

The climax of the film is the final showdown between the Uppukandam brothers and Ananthan Pillai. In a thrilling and action-packed sequence, the brothers confront their nemesis and ultimately deliver justice for Chacko.

== Cast ==
- Captain Raju as Uppukandam Kariyachan
- Mohan Raj as Uppukandam Paulachan
- Babu Antony as Uppukandam Sevichan
- Jagadish as Uppukandam Josekutty
- Baiju as Uppukandam Thankachan
- Siddique as SP Roy Mathews (Extended Cameo)
- Geetha as Uppukandam Alice, Sister of Uppukandam brothers and Roy's Wife
- Maathu as Leena Chandy, Josekutty's Wife
- Jagathy Sreekumar as Kunjeesho
- Sonia as Annie, Thankachan's Love Interest
- Kalpana as Elamma Kariyachan
- Philomina as Kunjannamma, Kunjeesho's Mother
- Rajan P. Dev as Ettuveettil Ananthan Pillai
- Bheeman Raghu as Ettuveettil Pankajakshan
- Kundara Johny as Ettuveettil Vasu
- Rizabawa as Vasu's Son
- Raveendran as Vasu's Son
- Mahesh as Ettuveettil Sunil
- Prathapachandran as Chandikunju, Leena's Father
- Zainuddin as Keshu Nair, Ananthan Pillai's Assistant
- Vijayakumar as James Chacko
- N. F. Varghese as Chacko, James's Father
- Kanakalatha as Annamma Chandy, Leena's Mother
- Thesni Khan as James's Sister
- Kalady Omana as James's Mother
- Thodupuzha Vasanthi as Ananthan Pillai's Wife
- Ponnamma Babu as Pankajakshan's Wife
- Sabnam as Vasu's Son's Wife
- Ajith Kollam as Ananthan Pillai's Brother
- Narayanankutty as Villager
