= Mr. Brahmachari =

- Poster
- Directed by: Thulasidas
- Screenplay by: J. Pallassery
- Story by: Mahesh Mithra
- Produced by: M. Mani
- Starring: Mohanlal; Meena; Nedumudi Venu; Jagathy Sreekumar
- Narrated by: J. Pallassery
- Cinematography: Venugopal Madathil
- Edited by: Ranjan Abraham
- Music by: Mohan Sithara; C. Rajamani (Score)
- Production company: Aroma Movie International
- Release date: 4 March 2003
- Country: India
- Language: Malayalam

Mr. Brahmachari (transl. Mr. Celibate) is a 2003 Indian Malayalam-language action comedy drama film directed by Thulasidas and written by J. Pallassery from a story by Mahesh Mithra. It was produced and distributed by M. Mani through the company Aroma Movie International.

The film stars Mohanlal in the lead role, with Meena, Nedumudi Venu, Jagathi Sreekumar, Jagadish, Kaviyoor Ponnamma and K. R. Vijaya in supporting roles. The film was released on 4 March 2003, and turned out to be a commercial success.

== Plot ==
A middle-aged man named Ananthan Thampi has made the decision never to get married in his life. He believes that marriage will cause him to lose his youth and masculinity. His main interests are bodybuilding and physique maintenance. Ananthan Thampi prefers to be a lifelong bachelor. Among his friends, he is referred to as "Thampi Annan". His two steadfastly devoted assistants, Rajappan and Varadappan, stand by him and his principles even if they secretly want to wed their true loves.

His mother Subhadramma and father Shekharan Thampi constantly make sacrifices in temples in hopes that one day their son may reconsider and change his mind. As beneficiaries of Ananthan Thampi's considerable inheritance, his sister Nirmala and her husband V. Venugopalan Thampi (a.k.a. VVT) are delighted with Thampi's single status.

Ganga and her family move to the Thampi neighborhood. Vasumathi, an elderly teacher who arrives there on a transfer, rents a home by Shekharan Thampi. She has four daughters. Sindhu, the oldest, is already married, while the other three; Ganga, Yamuna, and Kaveri, live with their mother. When they arrive at the rented house, Ganga's family is unable to unload their furniture and other items from the lorry due to the local laborers demanding huge wages. To maintain Thampi's sister's pride, he had to unload all of Ganga's family's goods by himself.

One day, a man named Aravindan approaches Thampi and requests for a job at his cable firm. Thampi believes Aravindan to be Ganga's lover and offers to assist in arranging their nuptials. Confusions occur, and Thampi is forced to marry Ganga.

== Cast ==
- Mohanlal as Ananthan Thampi a.k.a. Thampi Annan
- Meena as Ganga, Anathan's love interest and wife
- Nedumudi Venu as Sekharan Thampi, Ananthan's father
- Jagathy Sreekumar as V. Venugopalan Thampi a.k.a. V. V. T., Ananthan Thampi's brother-in-law
- Kaviyoor Ponnamma as Subhadramma, Ananthan's mother
- Devan as Raghavan
- Jagadish as Rajappan
- Sindhu Menon as Sevanthi
- Mohan Raj as Masthan Majeebhai
- Bindu Panicker as Nirmala, Ananthan Thampi's sister
- Kalpana as Anasooya
- Prem Kumar as Varadappan
- Vijayakumar as Aravindan
- K. R. Vijaya as Vasumathi, Ganga's mother
- Jose Prakash as Sukumaran, Aravindan's father
- Rajashree as Sindhu
- Sruthi Nair (Devika Rani) as Yamuna
- Nivia Rebin as Kaveri
- Jagannatha Varma as Krishnaswamy, the Thirumeni
- Saju Kodiyan as Shokkalingam
- Kozhikode Narayanan Nair as Hari, Tea Shop Owner
- Sajan Palluruthy as Chandran Milk seller
- Krishna Prasad
- Bayilvan Ranganathan as Aashaan
- Lakshana as Muslim girl (cameo appearance)

== Production ==
The film's shooting took place in Tenkasi, Tamil Nadu, and in Shoranur, Kerala.

== Soundtrack ==
The film features songs composed by Mohan Sithara with lyrics by Girish Puthenchery. The soundtrack album was released by Manorama Music on 1 February 2003. The background score was composed by C. Rajamani.

Track listing
No.	Title	Singer(s)	Length
1.	"Kaanana Kuyil"	M. G. Sreekumar, Radhika Thilak	5:14
2.	"Bhajare"	K. S. Chithra	5:06
3.	"Thidambeduthu"	M. G. Sreekumar, Sujatha Mohan	4:12
4.	"Ekanthamaay"	Sunil	4:46
5.	"Ninne Kandal"	Sujatha Mohan	4:22

== Reception ==
The film was well received in theatres and was a commercial success at the box office. Made on a budget of ₹1.40 crore, the film earned more than ₹2.50 crore in distributor's share alone. The Telugu remake right of Mr. Brahmachari was bought by Chiranjeevi.
