= Uppukandam Brothers: Back in Action =

Uppukandam Brothers Back in Action
- Film poster
- Directed by: T. S. Suresh Babu
- Written by: Reji Mathew
- Produced by: Thankachan Vismaya
- Starring: Srikanth; Babu Antony; Catherine Tresa; Baiju; Vani Viswanath; Honey Rose
- Cinematography: U. K. Senthil Kumar
- Edited by: Kapil Gopalakrishnan (Kapil Krishna)
- Music by: Alphons Joseph
- Production company: Vismaya studios
- Release date: 17 June 2011
- Country: India
- Language: Malayalam

Uppukandam Brothers Back in Action is a 2011 Malayalam-language Indian film. It stars Srikanth (in his debut of Malayalam film), Honey Rose and Babu Antony in the main roles. It is a sequel to the 1993 film Uppukandam Brothers. The film received mixed reviews. It was later dubbed and released in Tamil as Chatriya Vamsam.

== Plot ==
This is the story of the Uppukandam family consisting of brothers Sevichan, Josekutty, Bennychan, Kunjannamma, Kochammini, and Bobby. Their rivalry with Srambikkal Sathyaneshan over a previous episode intensifies after Ettuveetil Ganeshan, the son of deceased Etuveettil Ananthan Nambiar from the previous film joins forces with him.

== Cast ==
- Srikanth as Uppukandam Bobby
- Honey Rose as Sreelakshmi Maaraar
- Vani Viswanath as Uppukandam Kochammini
- Catherine Tresa as Vinila Sathyaneshan
- Babu Antony as Uppukandam Sevichan,Bobby's father
- Richard Rishi as Ettuveetil Ganeshan
- Jagadish as Uppukandam Josekutty (Joychan)
- Baiju as Uppukandam Bennychan
- Jagathy Sreekumar as Kunjeesho
- Seema as Uppukandam Kunjannamma, Kochammini's mother and Bobby's grandmother
- Suraj Venjaramoodu as D. Damodaran Thampi
- Harisree Asokan as 'Aakri' Shaji
- Ravi Vallathol as Kuttan Maaraar
- Narayanankutty as Soman
- Rajmohan Unnithan as Srampikkal Sathyaneshan
- Kanakalatha as Savithri, Sathyaneshan's wife
- Shameer Khan as Uppukandam Seban

== Differences from Uppukandam Brothers ==
This film does not truly fit into the same universe as Uppukandam Brothers since the identity of many characters contradict the latter. In Uppukandam Brothers, there are five Uppukandam Brothers, namely Kariachan, Paulachan, Sevichan, Josekutty, Bennichan, and a sister Alice, while Kariachan is married to Elamma. In the present film, however, there is Kunjannamma and Kochammini instead of Alice. Their relation is also handled inconsistently as, at various instances in the film, both Kunjannamma and Kochammini are addressed as their sister by the brothers, while Kochammini calls Kunjannamma her mother. Given their ages, there is no scope for their existence within the previous film. It is also mentioned that Sathyaneshan's younger brother whom Kochammini loved was killed by Ettuveettil Ananthan Pillai, who however, dies onscreen at the end of the previous film, which necessitates Kochammini's existence, adulthood, and proximity within the scope of that film.

While Kariachan is mentioned as deceased, no mention is made of Paulachan. Bobby and Seban are new brothers introduced in the film, with no precedent in the previous film. Their being born after the events of the previous film necessitates something like Alice/Kunjannamma marrying a second time, which is however not at all touched upon.

While Josekutty is a law graduate in the previous film, he becomes a police officer here. And no mention is made of Josekutty's and Bennichan's wives, Leena and Annie, whom they married at the end of the previous film. The actress who played Chandy's wife Annamma in the previous film plays Sathyaneshan's wife Savithri here, while the actress who played Ettuveettil Vasu's daughter-in-law plays a ward member romantically involved with Kunjeesho here.

== Music ==
The music for Uppukandam Brothers: Back in Action was composed by Alphons Joseph. The lyrics were penned by Santhosh Varma and Rajeev Alunkal.

No.	Title	Singer(s)	Lyricist
1	"Eshtam Ninnishtam"	Karthik, Manjari	Santhosh Varma
2	"Saronin Geetham"	Madhu Balakrishnan, Afsal, Elizabeth Raju	Santhosh Varma
3	"Thilakkam Vacha"	Shankar Mahadevan	Santhosh Varma
4	"Thilakkam Vacha (Remix)"	Shankar Mahadevan	Santhosh Varma
5	"Ventheerathu"	Rashmi Vijayan	Rajeev Alunkal

== Reception ==
A critic from Sify rated the film two out of five stars and called it one of the worst films in Malayalam. A critic from Rediff.com rated the film one out of five stars and opined that the film has nothing new.
