= Sandyakkenthinu Sindhooram =

- Directed by: P. G. Vishwambharan
- Written by: Kanam E. J. Thoppil Bhasi (dialogues)
- Screenplay by: Thoppil Bhasi
- Produced by: Somaja Abraham
- Starring: Dr.Balamuralikrishna; Mammootty; Seema; Nedumudi Venu; Venu Nagavally
- Cinematography: C. E. Babu
- Edited by: G. Venkittaraman
- Music by: Shyam
- Production company: CS Productions
- Distributed by: CS Productions
- Release date: 3 November 1984
- Country: India
- Language: Malayalam

Sandyakkenthinu Sindhooram is a 1984 Indian Malayalam film, directed by P. G. Vishwambharan and produced by Somaja Abraham. The film stars Dr. Balamuralikrishna, Malayalam movie actor, Mammootty, Seema, Nedumudi Venu and Venu Nagavally in the lead roles. The film has musical score by Shyam.

== Cast ==
- Dr.Balamuralikrishna
- Mammootty
- Seema
- Nedumudi Venu
- Venu Nagavally
- M. Balamuralikrishna
- Krishnachandran
- Santhosh
- V. D. Rajappan
- Baby Ambili
- Balan K. Nair
- Janardanan
- Kunchan
- Mala Aravindan
- Poojappura Ravi
- Soorya
- T. G. Ravi
- Kothuku Nanappan

== Soundtrack ==
The music was composed by Shyam and the lyrics were written by Kavalam Narayana Panicker.

No.	Song	Singers	Lyrics	Length (m:ss)
1	"Chanthamerina Poovilum"	S. Janaki	Kavalam Narayana Panicker	
2	"Maanasasarovaram"	S. Janaki	Kavalam Narayana Panicker	
3	"Manassin Aarohanam"	S. Janaki, M. Balamuralikrishna	Kavalam Narayana Panicker	
4	"Manassin Aarohanam"	K. G. Markose	Kavalam Narayana Panicker	
5	"Manassin Aarohanam" (F)	S. Janaki	Kavalam Narayana Panicker	
6	"Marubhoomi Chodichu"	S. Janaki	Kavalam Narayana Panicker	
7	"Ponnanthiyil"	K. J. Yesudas, S. Janaki	Kavalam Narayana Panicker	
8	"Raaga Vistharam"	M. Balamuralikrishna	Kavalam Narayana Panicker	
9	"Shivamkari Sadaa"	Krishnachandran	Kavalam Narayana Panicker	
10	"Shivamkari Sadaa"	K. J. Yesudas	Kavalam Narayana Panicker	
11	"Vadakkannam Kaattilu"	K. J. Yesudas	Kavalam Narayana Panicker	
