= List of Malayalam songs recorded by S. P. Balasubrahmanyam =

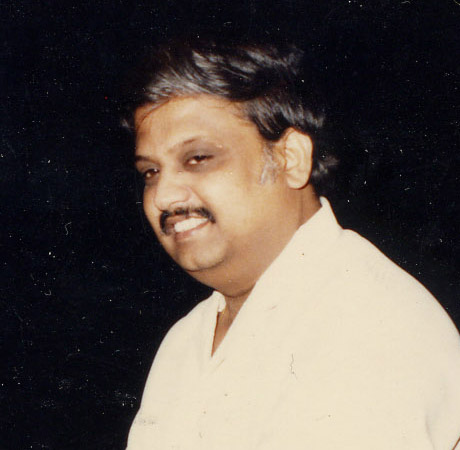
S. P. Balasubrahmanyam

S. P. Balasubrahmanyam (4 June 1946 – 25 September 2020), popularly known as SPB, was an Indian singer, composer, actor and film producer who has sung over 50,000 songs in various Indian languages. He recorded his first Malayalam film song in 1969 for the film, Kadalpalam. Following this, he went on to record about a hundred of songs until his last song, "Ayya Saamee" for the film, Kinar (2018).

The following is a list of Malayalam film songs recorded by SPB:

== Before 1990s ==
Year	Film	Song	Music director	Writer	Co-singer	Ref
1969	Kadalpalam	"Ee Kadalum Marukadalum"	G. Devarajan	Vayalar Ramavarma	Solo	
1971	Yogamullaval	"Neelasagara Theeram"	R. K. Shekhar	Sreekumaran Thampi	S. Janaki	
1971	Yogamullaval	"Padarnnu Padarnnu"	R. K. Shekhar	Sreekumaran Thampi	S. Janaki	
1973	Kavitha	"Adam Ente Appooppan"	K. Raghavan	P. Bhaskaran	P. Susheela	
1977	Pattalam Janaki	"Mele Maanathile"	K. J. Joy	Mankombu Gopalakrishnan; Bharanikkavu Sivakumar	P. Jayachandran	
1977	Chilanka	"Aare Aare"	K. V. Mahadevan	Mankombu Gopalakrishnan	Solo	
1978	Sivaranjini	"My Ammukkutti"	Ramesh Naidu	Mankombu Gopalakrishnan	Solo	
1978	Kaadu Njangalude Veedu	"Nagara Holi"	M. Ranga Rao	Sreekumaran Thampi	S. Janaki	
1979	Enikku Njaan Swantham	"Parakotti Thaalam Thatti"	Shyam	Bichu Thirumala	Solo	
1979	Shudhikalasam	"Ormakalil"	Shyam	Sreekumaran Thampi	S. Janaki, Ambili	
1979	Sarpam	"Swarnameeninte Chelotha"	K. J. Joy	Bichu Thirumala	K. J. Yesudas, P. Susheela, Vani Jairam	
1979	Ishtapraaneshwari	"Neeraazhiyum Poovaanamum"	Shyam	Bichu Thirumala	P. Jayachandran, Vani Jairam	
1980	Chandra Bimbam	"Nee Manassaay"	Shankar Ganesh	Ravi Vilangan	Solo	
1980	Thirakal Ezhuthiya Kavitha	"Bhale Bhale Assaami Nee"	M. S. Viswanathan	Mankombu Gopalakrishnan	L. R. Eswari	
1980	Thirakal Ezhuthiya Kavitha	"Hello Darling Nee Ente"	M. S. Viswanathan	Mankombu Gopalakrishnan	Ramola	
1980	Sankarabharanam	"Maanikya Veenaam"	K. V. Mahadevan	Mahakavi Kalidasan	Solo	
1980	Sankarabharanam	"Sangeetha Shikshanam"	K. V. Mahadevan	Mahakavi Kalidasan	S. Janaki	
1980	Sankarabharanam	"Nagumomu"	K. V. Mahadevan	Thyagaraja	S. Janaki	
1980	Sankarabharanam	"Omkaraara Naadaanusandhanamou"	K. V. Mahadevan	Veturi	S. Janaki	
1980	Sankarabharanam	"Shankaraa Naadashareeraa"	K. V. Mahadevan	Veturi	Solo	
1980	Sankarabharanam	"Raagam Thaanam Pallavi"	K. V. Mahadevan	Veturi	Solo	
1980	Sankarabharanam	"Saamajavaragamana"	K. V. Mahadevan	Veturi	S. Janaki	
1980	Sankarabharanam	"Omkaara (bit 1)"	K. V. Mahadevan	Veturi	Vani Jairam	
1980	Sankarabharanam	"Omkaara (bit 2)"	K. V. Mahadevan	Veturi	Vani Jairam	
1980	Sankarabharanam	"Dorakuna Ituvanti"	K. V. Mahadevan	Veturi	Vani Jairam	
1980	Sankarabharanam	"Brochevaarevarura"	K. V. Mahadevan	Mysore Vasudevachar	Vani Jairam	
1980	Sankarabharanam	"Maanasa Sancharare"	K. V. Mahadevan	Sadasiva Brahmendra	Vani Jairam	
1981	Munnettam	"Chirikondu Pothiyum"	Shyam	Sreekumaran Thampi	Solo	
1981	Thushaaram	"Manje Vaa Madhuvidhu Vela"	Shyam	Yusufali Kechery	K. J. Yesudas, Kousalya	
1981	Nizhal Yudham	"Madhu Mozhiyo"	K. J. Joy	Pappanamkodu Lakshmanan	Vani Jairam	
1981	Aakkramanam	"Lilly Lilly My Darling"	Shyam	Sreekumaran Thampi	S. P. Sailaja	
1981	Jeevikkan Padikkanam	"Aakaasham Nin Swantham"	Rajan-Nagendra	Sreekumaran Thampi	Solo	
1982	Kazhumaram	"Kallavaattinoppam"	Shankar Ganesh	Bichu Thirumala	Solo	
1982	Oru Vilippadakale	"Maanathe Nirangal"	Jerry Amaldev	P. Bhaskaran	Sherin Peters	
1982	Enikkum Oru Divasam	"Roohinte Kaaryam"	Shyam	Sreekumaran Thampi	K. J. Yesudas	
1983	Himam	"Gomedakam"	Shyam	Bichu Thirumala	S. Janaki, Jolly Abraham	
1983	Vasantholsavam	"Vaanam Thazhe Vannal"	Ilaiyaraaja	Poovachal Khader	Solo	
1983	Vasantholsavam	"Varunnu Varunne Ini"	Ilaiyaraaja	Poovachal Khader	S. Janaki	
1983	Mazhakkaalamegham	"Premathin"	Rangan	Poovachal Khader	Solo	
1983	Snehabandham	"Oru Jeevitha Kadhayithu"	Gangai Amaran	Poovachal Khader	Solo	
1983	Sagara Sangamam	"Vedham Anuvil"	Ilaiyaraaja	Sreekumaran Thampi	S. P. Sailaja	
1983	Sagara Sangamam	"Naadha Vinodam"	Ilaiyaraaja	Sreekumaran Thampi	S. P. Sailaja	
1983	Yudham	"Kanyakamaarkkoru"	Shankar Ganesh	Poovachal Khader	Solo	
1983	Yudham	"Thaarunyathin Aaraamathil"	Shankar Ganesh	Poovachal Khader	Vani Jairam	
1984	Thennal Thedunna Poovu	"Phanam Virichaal"	M. S. Viswanathan	Mankombu Gopalakrishnan	Solo	
1985	Raagam Anandabhairavi	"Chaithra Kusumaanjali"	Ramesh Naidu	Mankombu Gopalakrishnan	Solo	
1985	Raagam Anandabhairavi	"Thillaana"	Ramesh Naidu	Mankombu Gopalakrishnan	Solo	
1985	Raagam Anandabhairavi	"Gurur Brahma"	Ramesh Naidu	Mankombu Gopalakrishnan	Solo	
1987	New Delhi	"Thoomanjin"	Shyam	Shibu Chakravarthy	Solo	
1987	Swathi Thirunal	"Devanuke Pathi"	M. B. Sreenivasan	Swathi Thirunal	Solo	
1987	Samarppanam	"Saardhakamaakunnu"	Vijay Anand	Poovachal Khader	Solo	
1987	Samarppanam	"Vidarunnu Neeyen"	Vijay Anand	Poovachal Khader	K. S. Chithra	
1987	Samarppanam	"Daahavum Neeyaay"	Vijay Anand	Poovachal Khader	K. S. Chithra	
1988	Manasa Puthri	"Eethalirilum"	Guna Singh	Poovachal Khader	Solo	
1988	Manasa Puthri	"Maarivillo Neeyennomane"	Guna Singh	Poovachal Khader	Solo	
1988	Sangeetha Sangamam	"Thakathikudhom"	K. V. Mahadevan	Mankombu Gopalakrishnan	Solo	
1988	Sangeetha Sangamam	"Jaanaki Kaantha"	K. V. Mahadevan	Mankombu Gopalakrishnan	Solo	
1989	The News	"Paadi Njaan Aadatte"	Rajamani	Kaithapram	Solo	
1989	Ramji Rao Speaking	"Kalikkalam Ithu Kalikkalam"	S. Balakrishnan	Bichu Thirumala	Solo	

== After 1990s ==
Year	Film	Song	Music director	Writer	Co-singer	Ref
1990	Indrajaalam	"Dil Hai"	S. P. Venkatesh	P. B. Sreenivas	Solo	
1990	Geethanjali	"Oh Priye Priye"	Ilaiyaraaja	Anthikkad Mani	K. S. Chithra	
1990	Geethanjali	"Illimulam Kaattinullil"	Ilaiyaraaja	Anthikkad Mani	K. S. Chithra	
1990	Geethanjali	"Om Namaha"	Ilaiyaraaja	Anthikkad Mani	S. Janaki	
1990	Geethanjali	"Kaavyangal Paadumo"	Ilaiyaraaja	Anthikkad Mani	Solo	
1990	Geethanjali	"Oh Paapa Laali"	Ilaiyaraaja	Anthikkad Mani	Solo	
1990	Geethanjali	"Jagada Jagada"	Ilaiyaraaja	Anthikkad Mani	Solo	
1991	Anaswaram	"Thaarapatham Chethoharam"	Ilaiyaraaja	P. K. Gopi	K. S. Chithra	
1991	Anaswaram	"Kallellaam"	Ilaiyaraaja	P. K. Gopi	Malaysia Vasudevan, C. O. Anto	
1991	Kilukkam	"Ootty Pattanam"	S. P. Venkatesh	Bichu Thirumala	M. G. Sreekumar, K. S. Chithra	
1991	Adayalam	"James Bond"	Shyam	Bichu Thirumala	Solo	
1991	Inapraavukal	"Ente Chodyangal"	Raamlaxman	Poovachal Khader	Solo	
1991	Inapraavukal	"Hridayam Niraye Nin"	Raamlaxman	Poovachal Khader	Solo	
1991	Inapraavukal	"Hridayam Koduthu"	Raamlaxman	Poovachal Khader	K. S. Chithra	
1991	Inapraavukal	"Hridayam Niraye (bit)"	Raamlaxman	Poovachal Khader	K. S. Chithra	
1991	Inapraavukal	"Pennallo Nee Aanallo Njaan"	Raamlaxman	Poovachal Khader	K. S. Chithra	
1991	Inapraavukal	"Saayam Sandhya"	Raamlaxman	Poovachal Khader	K. S. Chithra	
1991	Inapraavukal	"Veendum Veendum"	Raamlaxman	Poovachal Khader	K. S. Chithra	
1993	Gandharvam	"Nenjil Kanjabanam"	S. P. Venkatesh	Kaithapram	Solo	
1993	Butterflies	"Paal Nilavile"	Raveendran	K. Jayakumar	Solo	
1993	O' Faby	"Dingara Dinga"	Johnson	Bichu Thirumala	Solo	
1993	Eeswaramurthy IN	"Innu Raavil Poonilavil"	A. T. Ummer	Vasan	Indira	
1993	Pranavam	"Sangeethame"	K. V. Mahadevan	Mankombu Gopalakrishnan	Solo	
1993	Hamsangal	"Paalkkinnamo"	Ouseppachan	Shibu Chakravarthy	K. S. Chithra	
1994	Bheesmacharya	"Swargaminiyenikku"	S. P. Venkatesh	Yusufali Kechery	Solo	
1994	Rajadhani	"Aayi Basanti"	Johnson	Bichu Thirumala	Solo	
1994	Pidakkozhi Koovunna Noottandu	"Ezhaazhi Neenthi"	S. P. Venkatesh	Kavalam Narayana Panicker	S. Janaki	
1994	The City	"Bahon Mein"	Johnson	Bichu Thirumala	Solo	
1994	Sukham Sukhakaram	"Sukhakaram"	Ravindra Jain	S. Ramesan Nair	K. S. Chithra	
1994	Vardhakya Puranam	"Vallathoru Yogam"	Kannur Rajan	S. Ramesan Nair	Solo	
1994	Gentleman Security	"Paathiraavil"	S. P. Venkatesh	Kaithapram	Solo	
1996	Ammuvinte Aangalamar	"Aararumariyaathe"	Jayapal	S. Ramesan Nair	Solo	
1997	Kulam	"Thiranthu Paarthen"	M. G. Radhakrishnan	V. Madhusoodanan Nair	Solo	
1997	Oru Yathramozhi	"Kakkalakkannamma"	Ilaiyaraaja	Gireesh Puthenchery	M. G. Sreekumar	
1997	Shantipuram Thampuran	"Oh My Love"	Berny Ignatius	Gireesh Puthenchery	Solo	
1997	Swarna Chamaram	"Melam Ee Manmadha"	M. M. Keeravani	K. Jayakumar	M. G. Sreekumar	
1997	Swarna Chamaram	"Sangeetham Rathnaakaram"	M. M. Keeravani	K. Jayakumar	M. G. Sreekumar	
1999	Chandranudikkunna Dikkil	"Thei Oru Thanavayal"	Vidyasagar	S. Ramesan Nair	M. G. Sreekumar, Sujatha Mohan	
2000	Darling Darling	"Darling Darling"	Ouseppachan	S. Ramesan Nair	Solo	
2000	Monisha Ente Monalisa (D)	"Hello Hello"	T. Rajendar	Poovachal Khader	Sujatha Mohan	
2001	Soothradharan	"Darshan"	Raveendran	S. P. Ramesh	Gayathri Ashokan	
2001	Dhosth	"Dosth"	Vidyasagar	S. Ramesan Nair	Biju Narayanan	
2001	Ponnu	"Kalaasubhage"	Subhash	Sidharthan	Solo	
2001	Ponnu	"Bandhangal Bandhanathin"	Subhash	Sidharthan	Solo	
2002	Phantom	"Maattupongal"	Deva	Gireesh Puthenchery	K. S. Chithra	
2002	Phantom	"Maattupongal (solo)"	Deva	Gireesh Puthenchery	Solo	
2003	C. I. D. Moosa	"Maine Pyar Kiya"	Vidyasagar	Gireesh Puthenchery	Solo	
2004	Vamanapuram Bus Route	"Raajavin Paarvai"	M. S. Viswanathan	Kannadasan	K. S. Chithra	
2010	Shikkar	"Prathighatinsu"	M. Jayachandran	Bhuvana Chandra	Solo	
2012	Sri Rama Rajyam	"Saptashwarathamarudham"	Ilaiyaraaja	Mankombu Gopalakrishnan	Solo	
2013	Lillies of March	"Venpanithulli"	Anuraj	John Dhanaraj	Deepa Miriam	
2018	Kinar	"Ayya Sami"	M. Jayachandran	B. K. Harinarayanan; Palani Bharathi	K. J. Yesudas	
