= Poojappura Ravi =

Indian actor (1936–2023)

- Born: Raveendran Nair; 28 October 1936; Poojappura, Kingdom of Travancore, British India (present day Thiruvananthapuram, Kerala, India)
- Died: 18 June 2023 (aged 86); Marayur, Kerala, India
- Other name: Ravi
- Occupation: Actor
- Years active: 1962–2023
- Parents: Madhavan Pillai; Bhavaniyamma

Raveendran Nair (28 October 1936 – 18 June 2023), known by his stage name Poojappura Ravi, was an Indian actor who primarily performed comedy roles in Malayalam films.

== Career ==
Poojappura Ravi was a stage actor and was a part of the drama institution Kalanilayam Drama Vision. He had appeared in Malayalam films starting in the mid-1970s, as well as in many black and white movies produced in Kerala. Ravi was a flexible character actor. and appeared in over 600 films. In the 1990s, he appeared in television serials.

== Personal life and death ==
Ravi was born to Madhavan Pillai and Bhavaniyamma, as the eldest of four children, at Poojappura, Thiruvananthapuram. He attended Chinnamma Memorial Girls High School and Thirumala Higher Secondary School. He was married to Thankamma, and had a daughter, Lakshmi, and a son, Hari Kumar. Ravi died at his daughter's residence in Marayur, Idukki on 18 June 2023, at the age of 86.

== Awards ==
- Ragamalika – JAYAN Award 2012

== Filmography ==
=== 1960s ===
Year	Title	Role	Notes
1962	Veluthambi Dalawa		

=== 1970s ===
Year	Title	Role	Notes
1976	Neela Sari		
1976	Ammini Ammaavan	Swami	
1977	Sangamam		
1977	Sujatha	Thirumeni	
1977	Santha Oru Devatha		
1977	Pattalam Janaki		
1977	Ormakal Marikkumo	Vaidyar	
1977	Ivanente Priyaputhran		
1977	Aval Oru Devaalayam		
1978	Puthariyankam		
1978	Aanayum Ambaariyum		
1978	Padmatheertham	Prabhakaran	
1978	Rowdy Ramu	Mani Swami	
1978	Asthamayam		
1978	Ithaa Oru Manushyan	Kuttan Pilla	
1978	Prarthana		
1978	Tiger Salim		
1978	Adikku Adi		
1978	Black Belt		
1978	Karimpuli		
1978	Priyadarshini		
1978	Manoradham		
1978	Pokkattadikkaari		
1978	Snehikkan Samayamilla		
1978	Vishwaroopam		
1978	Pokkattadikkaari		
1978	Padmatheertham	Prabhakaran	
1978	Paavaadakkaari		
1978	Aanayum Ambaariyum		
1978	Thacholi Ambu		
1979	Venalil Oru Mazha	Shop Keeper	
1979	Puthiya Velicham	Vaidhyar Kesavan Nair	
1979	Pambaram		
1979	Pichathy Kuttappan	Pappan	
1979	Simhaasanam		
1979	Avalude Prathikaram		
1979	Raajaveedhi		
1979	Aayiram Vasanthangal		
1979	Iniyethra Sandhyakal		
1979	Shudhikalasham	Subramanya Iyyer	
1979	Maamaankam	Samoothiri's Warrior	
1979	Prabhaathasandhya		
1979	Bhaaryaye Aavashyamundu		
1979	Kaalam Kaathu Ninnilla		
1979	Pancharathnam		
1979	Sayoojyam	Kadarkkutti	
1979	Jeevitham Oru Gaanam	Kuttan Pillai	

=== 1980s ===
Year	Title	Role	Notes
1980	Sakthi	Man at the Toddy Shop	
1980	Saraswathi Yaamam	Ganesh	
1980	Youvanam Daaham		
1980	Theenalangal	Kunjappan	
1980	Ambalavilakku	Radhakrishnan Sir	
1980	Idi Muzhakkam	Kochu Panikkar	
1980	Pralayam	Ravi	
1980	Panchapaandavar		
1980	Naayattu		
1981	Ariyappedatha Rahasyam	Paramu	
1981	Enne Snehikkoo Enne Maathram		
1981	Garjanai		
1981	Dwandha Yudham		
1981	Aakkramanam	Chandi	
1981	Arikkaari Ammu		
1981	Swapnaraagam		
1981	Veliyattam	Paramu	
1981	Ammakkorumma		
1981	Choothattam		
1981	Kadathu		
1981	Thenum Vayambum	Laundry man	
1981	Kaattu Kallan	Kittunni Pillai	
1981	Ellaam Ninakku Vendi	Venu	
1982	Raktha Sakshi		
1982	Chilanthivala		
1982	Dhrohi		
1982	Enikkum Oru Divasam	Thankappan	
1982	Ithum Oru Jeevitham	Seetha's father	
1982	Kazhumaram		
1982	Ithu Njangalude Katha		
1983	Oomana Thinkal		
1983	Thimingalam	Chacko	
1983	Swapname Ninakku Nandi	Pachu Pilla	
1983	Deepaaradhana	Kuttan	
1983	Kuyiline Thedi	Ramunni Master	
1983	Coolie	Moneylender	
1983	Engane Nee Marakkum		
1983	Eettappuli	Peter	
1984	Veendum Chalikkunna Chakram	Swamy	
1984	Kilikkonjal		
1984	Muthodu Muthu	Govindan	
1984	Kudumbam Oru Swargam Bharya Oru Devatha	John	
1984	Itha Innu Muthal	Ravi	
1984	Nishedhi	Narayana Pilla	
1984	Ente Kalithozhan		
1984	Attahaasam		
1984	Sandyakkenthinu Sindhooram		
1984	Oru Thettinte Kadha		
1984	Vanitha Police	Vasu Pilla	
1984	Poochakkoru Mookkuthi	Supran	
1984	Odaruthammava Aalariyam	Lambodaran Pillai	
1985	Oru Naal Innoru Naal		
1985	Anakkorumma	Narayana Pilla	
1985	Sammelanam		
1985	Guerrilla		
1985	Pacha Velicham	Thankavelu's friend	
1985	Kiratham	Kuttan Pilla	
1985	Mukya Manthri		
1985	Kaiyum Thlayum Purathidaruthe	Police Constable	
1985	Mutharamkunnu P.O.	Phalgunan	
1985	Pathamudayam	Kuttan Pillai	
1985	Akkare Ninnoru Maran	Kanaran	
1985	Ithu Nalla Thamasha	Kumaran Vaidyar	
1985	Snehicha Kuttathinu	Ramunni Ashan	
1986	Ayalvasi Oru Daridravasi	Minnal Paramasivam	
1986	Naale Njangalude Vivaham	Peon Pilla	
1986	Sakhavu		
1986	Dheem Tharikida Thom	ASI Santhosh	
1986	Love Story	H. C. Balan Pilla	
1986	Chekkeranoru Chilla		
1986	Pidikittapulli		
1986	Ponnum Kudathinum Pottu	Thoma	
1986	Yuvajanotsavam	Ajayan	
1986	Rakkuyilin Ragasadassil		
1986	Mazha Peyyunnu Maddalam Kottunnu	Dr. Chandrappan	
1986	Nandi Veendum Varika	Mathachan	
1986	Ninnistham Ennishtam		
1986	Niramulla Ravulkal	Peter	
1987	Kanikanum Neram		
1987	Athinumappuram		
1987	Amme Bhagavathi	Pappachan	
1987	Yagini		
1987	Ellavarkkum Nanmakal		
1988	Oru CBI Diary Kurippu	Mathai	
1988	Charavalayam	Kuttan Pilla	
1988	Uyaran Ormikan		
1988	August 1	Kaimal	
1988	Witness	Professor Chandrasekharan	
1989	Ayiram Chirakulla Moham	Anandanarayana Iyyer	
1989	Crime Branch	PC Shankara Pilla	
1989	Annakutty Kodambakkam Vilikkunnu		
1989	Pooram		
1989	Najangalude Kochu Doctor	Parameshwara Kurup	
1989	Muthukkudayum Choodi	Parameshwara Kurup	
1989	Vardhaka Gunda		
1989	Malayathi Pennu		
1989	Charithram	Kurup	

=== 1990s ===
Year	Title	Role	Notes
1990	Superstar	Shenoy	
1990	Sesham Screenil		
1990	Krooran		
1990	Apsarassu		
1990	Champion Thomas	Manthravali	
1990	Gulabi Raaten		
1990	Kadathanadan Ambadi	Naduvazhi	
1990	Aaram Vardil Aabhayandhara Kalakam		
1990	Judgement		
1990	Maanmizhiyaal		
1991	Nettippattom	Jambo Jamal	
1991	Nattuvishesham	Forest Guard	
1991	Raid	Nagan Pilla	
1991	Kilukkam		
1991	Orutharam Randutharam Moonnutharam		
1991	Vaasavadatha		
1991	Naagam		
1991	Chanchattam	Bus Driver	
1992	Maanyanmar	Arumugham	
1992	Kunukkitta Kozhi		
1992	Aham	Warrier	
1992	Kallan Kappalil Thanne	Subramaniyam Swami	
1992	Sabarimalayil Thanka Sooryodayam	Rajappan	
1992	Adharam	Sankaran Nair	
1992	Kizhakkan Pathrose	Fr. Joseph	
1993	Eeswaramurthi In		
1993	Aalavattam	Bhasi Pillai	
1993	Customs Diary		
1993	Aayirappara	Kurup	
1994	Gothram	Moideen	
1994	Pidakkozhi Koovunna Noottandu	Pappaswami	
1994	Pavam IA Ivachan	Head constable	
1995	Hijack	Parthan	
1995	Agnidevan	Payippadan	
1995	Kaattile Thadi Thevarude Ana	Policeman	
1995	Indian Military Intelligence	Mohana Varma	
1995	Vrudhanmare Sookshikkuka	Swamy	
1996	Kaalapani	Nampoothiri	
1996	Dilliwala Rajakumaran	Janardanan	
1997	Killikurushiyile Kudumba Mela	Gap Swamy	
1997	Janathipathyam	Sathya	
1997	The Car	Koshy	
1997	Shobhanam		
1998	Sreekrishnapurathe Nakshathrathilakkam	Chellappan	
1998	Meenthoni		
1998	Harikrishnans	Ramabhadran	
1999	Stalin Sivadas	Nambiar	
1999	American Ammayi	Keshu Nair	
1999	Kannezhuthi Pottum Thottu		
1999	Rishivamsam		
1999	Varnachirakukal		

=== 2000s ===
Year	Title	Role	Notes
2000	Pilots	Chandy	
2000	Vedathy		
2001	Naranathu Thampuran	Thamarakshan	
2001	Nariman	Policeman	
2001	Vezhambal		
2001	Achaneyanenikkishtam	Chettiyar	
2002	Mayilpeelithaalu		
2002	Kanalkireedam		
2002	Vasanthamalika		
2003	Sahodaran Sahadevan	Balan Nair	
2003	Kilichundan Mampazham	Chappunni Nair	
2004	Freedom		
2005	Thaskaraveeran		
2006	Highway Police	Vanam Vaasu	
2006	Mahasamudram		
2008	Thirakkatha		
2008	Twenty:20		Video Footage
2008	Manjadikuru	Lawyer	
2009	Changathi Koottam		
2009	Seetha Kalyanam	Priest	
2009	Love in Singapore		

=== 2010s ===
Year	Title	Role	Notes
2010	Inganeyum Oral	Majeed	
2010	Thaskara Lahala		
2011	Nadakame Ulakam		
2011	Kottarathil Kutti Bhootham		
2011	Ninnishtam Ennishtam 2		
2011	August 15	Swamy	
2011	Sandwich	Adv. Purushothaman	
2012	Ardhanaari		
2012	Mullassery Madhavan Kutty Nemom P. O.	movie actor	
2013	Nakhangal	Kuruppu	
2013	Isaac Newton S/O Philipose	Hindi Teacher Namboothiri	
2014	Konthayum Poonoolum		
2014	Njaanaanu Party		
2014	8:20		
2015	Cinema @ PWD Rest House		
2015	Payyamvalli Chanthu		
2016	Oravasaram		
2016	Darvinte Parinamam	Priest	
2016	Guppy	Chinnappan	
2017	Pokkiri Simon	Security	

== Television ==
- Mandrake (Asianet)
- Kadamattathu Kathanar (Asianet)
- Dream city (Surya TV)
- Kadamattathachan (Surya TV)
- Bhaamini Tholkarila (Asianet)
- Swami Ayyappan (TV series) (Asianet)
- Mahathma Gandhi Colony (Surya TV)
- Melappadam (Doordarshan)
- Aluvayum Mathikariyum (Asianet Plus)
- Kittunni Ammavan Vannu (Doordarshan 1993)
