= M. Mani =

Indian film producer and director (1946/1947–2024)

- Born: 30 November 1939; Trivandrum, Travancore, India
- Died: 14 July 2024 (aged 84); Thiruvananthapuram, Kerala, India
- Occupations: Film producer; film director
- Years active: 1977–2024

M. Mani (30 November 1939 – 14 July 2024), also known as Aroma Mani, was an Indian film producer and director in the Malayalam and Tamil film industries. He produced more than 60 movies and directed more than 10 under the banner Sunitha Productions and Aroma Movie International. He made his debut with the movie Dheerasameere Yamunaatheere in 1977. Mani died on 14 July 2024, at the age of 84.

== Awards ==
- 1985: National Film Award for Best Feature Film in Malayalam for Thinkalaazhcha Nalla Divasam
- 1986: National Film Award for Best Film on Other Social Issues for Doore Doore Oru Koodu Koottam

== Filmography ==
=== Malayalam ===
==== Producer ====
- Dheerasameere Yamunaatheere (1977)
- Urakkam Varaatha Raathrikal (1978)
- Rowdy Ramu (1978)
- Enikku Njaan Swantham (1979)
- Neeyo Njaano (1979)
- Kalliyankattu Neeli (1979)
- Ithile Vannavar (1980)
- Eden Thottam (1980)
- Kallan Pavithran (1981)
- Pinneyum Pookkunna Kaadu (1981)
- Oru Thira Pinneyum Thira (1982)
- Aa Divasam (1982)
- Kuyilinethedi (1983)
- Engine Nee Marakkum (1983)
- Muthodu Muthu (1984)
- Veendum Chalikkunna Chakram (1984)
- Ente Kalithozhan (1984)
- Aanakkorumma (1985)
- Thinkalazhcha Nalla Divasam (1985)
- Pachavelicham (1985)
- Doore Doore Oru Koodu Koottam (1986)
- Ponnumkudathinum Pottu (1986)
- Love Story (1986)
- Irupatham Noottandu (1987)
- Oru CBI Diary Kurippu (1988)
- August 1 (1988)
- Jagratha(1989)
- Kottayam Kunjachan (1990)
- Souhrudam (1990)
- Soorya Gayathri (1992)
- Pandu Pandoru Rajakumari (1992)
- Dhruvam (1993)
- Rudraksham (1994)
- Commissioner (1994)
- Vrudhanmare Sookshikkuka (1995)
- Janathipathyam (1997)
- Pallavur Devanarayanan (1999)
- Prem Poojari (1999)
- F. I. R (1999)
- Naranathu Thampuran (2001)
- Kattuchembakam (2002)
- Mr. Brahmachari (2003)
- Balettan (2003)
- Maampazhakkaalam (2004)
- Lokanathan IAS (2005)
- Raavanan (2006)
- Kanaka Simhasanam (2006)
- Colours (2009)
- Oru Black and White Kudumbam (2009)
- Drona 2010 (2010)
- August 15 (2011)
- Artist (2013)

==== Director ====
- Aa Divasam (1982)
- Kuyiline Thedi (1983)
- Engine Nee Marakkum (1983)
- Muthodu Muthu (1984)
- Ente Kalithozhan (1984)
- Aanakkorumma (1985)
- Pachavelicham (1985)

==== Story ====
- Aa Divasam (1982)

=== Tamil ===
- Gomathi Nayagam (2005)
- Kasi (2001)
- Unnudan (1998)
- Arangetra Velai (1990)
