= Ente Kalithozhan =

- Promotional poster
- Directed by: M. Mani
- Produced by: M. Mani
- Starring: Shankar; Sabitha Anand; Adoor Bhasi; Sukumari; K. P. Ummer
- Music by: Shyam
- Production company: Sunitha Productions
- Distributed by: Sunitha Productions
- Release date: 5 January 1984
- Country: India
- Language: Malayalam

Ente Kalithozhan (transl. My Playmate) is a 1984 Indian Malayalam-language film, directed and produced by M. Mani. The film stars Shankar, Sabitha Anand, Adoor Bhasi, Sukumari and K. P. Ummer. The film has musical score by Shyam.

== Plot ==
Ente Kalithozhan is a romantic film.

== Cast ==
- Shankar
- Sabitha Anand
- Ramu
- Sukumari
- Adoor Bhasi
- K. P. Ummer
- Sathyakala
- V. D. Rajappan
- Anuradha
- Poojappura Ravi

== Soundtrack ==
Ente Kalithozhan

Film score by Shyam
- Genre: Feature film soundtrack
- Length: 24:48

The music was composed by Shyam and the lyrics were written by Chunakkara Ramankutty.

No.	Song	Singers	Lyrics	Length (m:ss)
1	"Arayannappida"	K. J. Yesudas, S. Janaki	Chunakkara Ramankutty	
2	"O Malaraay Madhuvaay"	S. Janaki	Chunakkara Ramankutty	
3	"Paarijaatham Panineeril"	K. J. Yesudas	Chunakkara Ramankutty	
4	"Priyaragangal Thookan"	K. J. Yesudas	Chunakkara Ramankutty	
