= Deepaaradhana =

- Directed by: Vijayanand
- Written by: T. K. Balachandran
- Screenplay by: T. K. Balachandran
- Produced by: T. K. Balachandran
- Starring: Prem Nazir; M. G. Soman; Seema; T. G. Ravi
- Cinematography: C. Ramachandra Menon
- Edited by: K. Narayanan
- Music by: A. T. Ummer
- Production company: Teakebees
- Distributed by: Teakebees
- Release date: 21 October 1983
- Country: India
- Language: Malayalam

Deepaaradhana is a 1983 Indian Malayalam film, directed by Vijayanand and produced by T. K. Balachandran. The film stars Prem Nazir, M. G. Soman, Seema and T. G. Ravi in the lead roles. The film has musical score by A. T. Ummer.

== Cast ==
- Prem Nazir as Rahim
- M. G. Soman as Damu
- Seema as Vilasini
- T. G. Ravi as Menon
- Anuradha as Painkili/Padmaja
- Nellikode Bhaskaran as Sankaran Potti
- Santhakumari as Dakshyayani
- Vanitha Krishnachandran as Jaanu
- Krishnachandran as Vishnu
- Kunchan as Vasu
- Meena as Chinthamani Chellamma
- Prathapachandran as Minister
- Poojappura Ravi as Kuttan
- V. D. Rajappan as Kittan
- C. I. Paul as Muthalali

== Soundtrack ==
The music was composed by A. T. Ummer and the lyrics were written by Poovachal Khader.

No.	Song	Singers	Lyrics	Length (m:ss)
1	"Brahmaswaroopini Devi"	Krishnachandran	Poovachal Khader	
2	"Njan Ninakkaay"	B. Vasantha	Poovachal Khader	
3	"Vaippin Karayile"	P. Jayachandran	Poovachal Khader	
