= Veendum Chalikkunna Chakram =

- Poster
- Directed by: P. G. Vishwambharan
- Written by: John Alunkal
- Produced by: M. Mani
- Starring: Shankar; Mammootty; Menaka; Aruna
- Cinematography: C. E. Babu
- Edited by: G. Venkittaraman
- Music by: Shyam
- Production company: Sunitha Productions
- Distributed by: Aroma Release
- Release date: 17 February 1984
- Country: India
- Language: Malayalam

Veendum Chalikkunna Chakram (transl. Wheel that spins again) is a 1984 Indian Malayalam-language film directed by P. G. Vishwambharan and produced by M. Mani. The film stars Shankar, Mammootty, Menaka and Aruna. The film has musical score by Shyam.

== Cast ==
- Shankar as Vinayan
- Mammootty as Jose
- Menaka as Prameela Nair
- Aruna as Meera Joseph
- Kundara Johny as Raghavan Nair
- Poojappura Ravi as Swamy
- Santhakumari as Devakiyamma
- V. D. Rajappan
- Prathapachandran
- Jagannatha Varma
- Kannur Sreelatha
- Noohu

== Soundtrack ==
The music was composed by Shyam and the lyrics were written by Chunakkara Ramankutty.

No.	Song	Singers	Lyrics	Length (m:ss)
1	"Devi Nee Prabhaathamaay"	K. J. Yesudas, S. Janaki	Chunakkara Ramankutty	
2	"Oh Shaarike"	K. J. Yesudas	Chunakkara Ramankutty	
3	"Rajani Than Malarvirinju"	K. J. Yesudas	Chunakkara Ramankutty	
