= Aa Divasam =

- Theatrical release poster
- Directed by: M. Mani
- Screenplay by: Jagathy N. K. Achari
- Story by: M. Mani
- Produced by: M. Mani
- Starring: Mammootty; Mohanlal; Sukumaran; Jagathy Sreekumar
- Cinematography: D. D. Prasad
- Edited by: V. P. Krishnan
- Music by: Shyam
- Production company: Sunitha Productions
- Distributed by: Aroma Movies
- Release date: 26 November 1982
- Running time: 130 minutes
- Country: India
- Language: Malayalam

Aa Divasam (transl. That Day) is a 1982 Indian Malayalam-language film directed and produced by M. Mani and written by Jagathy N. K. Achari from a story by Mani. The film stars Mammootty, Mohanlal, Sukumaran and Jagathy Sreekumar. The film has musical score by Shyam.

== Plot ==
Aa Divasam is an action film where lead players hunger for revenge.

== Cast ==
- Sukumaran as Dr. Rajan
- Mammootty as Balachandran IPS
- Mohanlal as Boss
- Jagathy Sreekumar as Rajappan
- Aryad Gopalakrishnan
- Bheeman Raghu
- Jyothi
- Kunchan as Pappan
- Noohu
- Ranipadmini
- Sathyakala
- Migdad

== Soundtrack ==
The music was composed by Shyam and the lyrics were written by Chunakkara Ramankutty.

| No. | Song | Singers | Lyrics | Length (m:ss) |
|---|---|---|---|---|
| 1 | "Chithrashalabhame Vaa" | S. Janaki | Chunakkara Ramankutty | |
| 2 | "Manikutty Chunakkutty" | K. J. Yesudas, S. Janaki | Chunakkara Ramankutty | |
| 3 | "Pottichirikkunna" | K. J. Yesudas, Vani Jairam | Chunakkara Ramankutty | |
| 4 | "Pravaahame Pravaahame" | K. J. Yesudas | Chunakkara Ramankutty | |
