= Love Story (1986 film) =

- Directed by: Sajan
- Produced by: M. Mani
- Starring: Rohini; Shafeeq; Bhagyalakshmi; Thilakan; Nedumudi Venu
- Music by: Shyam
- Production company: Sunitha Productions
- Distributed by: Sunitha Productions
- Release date: 22 December 1986
- Country: India
- Language: Malayalam

Love Story is a 1986 Indian Malayalam-language film, directed by Sajan and produced by M. Mani. The film stars Rohini, Shafeeq, Thilakan and Nedumudi Venu. The film has musical score by Shyam.

== Plot ==
Love Story is a love story between a rich boy and a poor girl.

== Cast ==
- Rohini as Shobha
- Bhagyalakshmi
- Shafeeq as Raju
- Nedumudi Venu as Kumaran Nair, Radhakrishnan (double role)
- Lalu Alex as Satheeshan
- Sabitha Anand as Savithri
- Adoor Bhavani as Janakiyamma
- Mala Aravindan as Krishnankutty
- V. D. Rajappan as Blade Shishumadan
- Innocent as Durgadas
- Lalithasree as Typing tutor
- KPAC Azeez as Vikraman
- Sukumari as Rukmini
- Sankaradi as Sreedharan
- Poojappura Ravi as H. C. Balan Pilla
- Jagannatha Varma as Menon
- Tony as Ajayan, college student
- Jagadish as Hameed
- Kollam Ajith as Gunda
- Thilakan

== Soundtrack ==
The music was composed by Shyam and the lyrics were written by Chunakkara Ramankutty.

| No. | Song | Singers | Lyrics | Length (m:ss) |
|---|---|---|---|---|
| 1 | "Chellakkuruvi" | K. J. Yesudas | Chunakkara Ramankutty | |
| 2 | "Oru Kadalolam" | K. J. Yesudas, K. S. Chithra, Chorus | Chunakkara Ramankutty | |
| 3 | "Oru Malarthoppile" | K. J. Yesudas | Chunakkara Ramankutty | |
| 4 | "Poovaaya "Poo | K. S. Chithra | Chunakkara Ramankutty | |
| 5 | "Poovaaya Poo" | K. J. Yesudas, K. S. Chithra | Chunakkara Ramankutty | |
| 6 | "Sneham Poothulanju" | K. J. Yesudas, K. S. Chithra | Chunakkara Ramankutty | |
