= Engane Nee Marakkum =

എങ്ങനെ നീ മറക്കും Engane Nee Marakkum
- Poster
- Directed by: M. Mani
- Written by: Priyadarshan
- Produced by: M. Mani
- Starring: Shankar; Mohanlal; Menaka; Bhagyasri
- Cinematography: Anandakuttan
- Edited by: G. Murali
- Music by: Shyam
- Production company: Sunitha Productions
- Distributed by: Aroma Release
- Release date: 14 October 1983
- Country: India
- Language: Malayalam

Engane Nee Marakkum (Malayalam pronunciation: [eŋgane niː marakkum]; transl. How can you forget?) is a 1983 Indian Malayalam-language romantic drama film produced and directed by M. Mani and written by Priyadarshan. It stars Shankar, Mohanlal and Menaka. The film features songs and score composed by Shyam. The story is about the love triangle between Shambhu, Prem, and Shobha.

== Plot ==
Prem and Sambhu are friends but their friendship takes a turn when they fall for the same woman, Shobha. The rest of the story unravels how their love and friendship changes.

== Cast ==
- Shankar as Premkumar
- Mohanlal as Shambhu
- Menaka as Shobha
- Bhagyalakshmi as Devi
- Sukumari
- Adoor Bhasi
- Sankaradi
- V. D. Rajappan
- Anuradha
- Kunchan
- Poojappura Ravi
- Ramu as Jayadevan
- Santhakumari

== Soundtrack ==
Engane Nee Marakkum

Soundtrack album by Shyam
- Released: 1 January 1983
- Genre: Feature film soundtrack
- Label: Saregama

Shyam chronology
Mazhu (1982)	Engane Nee Marakkum (1983)

Singles from Engane Nee Marakkum
- 1. "Vellitheril"

The music was composed by Shyam and the lyrics were written by Chunakkara Ramankutty. Single "Vellitheril" was sung by Vani Jairam and Krishnachandran.

Engane Nee Marakkum (Original Motion Picture Soundtrack) - EP
No.	Title	Singer(s)	Length
1.	"Devatharu Poothu, Pt. 1"	K. J. Yesudas, P. Susheela	4:09
2.	"Sarathkaala Sandhya"	K. J. Yesudas	4:35
3.	"Devatharu Poothu, Pt. 2"	Shyam, P. Susheela	3:44
4.	"Nee Swaramai"	K. J. Yesudas	4:25
5.	"Romeo Juliet"	S. Janaki, Krishnachandran	4:05

== Reception ==
The film was a commercial success at the box office and one of the biggest superhits of then superstar Shanker. Engane Nee Marakkum is one of the early films in which Mohanlal began playing comedic roles.
