= Doore Doore Oru Koodu Koottam =

- Directed by: Sibi Malayil
- Written by: Sreenivasan
- Produced by: M. Mani
- Starring: Mohanlal; Menaka; Jagathy Sreekumar; Nedumudi Venu; Mamukkoya; Sukumari; Kunjandi; Sreenivasan
- Cinematography: S. Kumar
- Edited by: V. P. Krishnan
- Music by: Shyam
- Production company: Sunitha Productions
- Distributed by: Aroma Release
- Release date: 11 January 1986
- Country: India
- Language: Malayalam

Doore Doore Oru Koodu Koottam (transl. Let's build a nest far far away) is a 1986 Indian Malayalam-language satirical comedy drama film directed by Sibi Malayil, written by Sreenivasan and produced by M. Mani. It stars Mohanlal, Menaka, Jagathy Sreekumar, Nedumudi Venu, Mamukkoya, Sukumari, Kunjandi, Sreenivasan, Sanath Mathur Innocent and K. P. A. C. Sunny in major roles. The film won the National Film Award for Best Film on Other Social Issues.

== Plot ==
The film is a socio-centric story of the education system that existed in the period 1980s to 1990s in Kerala. Divakaran, in search of a good job acquires fake certificates from Mysore TTC and becomes a teacher in a government-aided lower primary school run by a corrupt manager. The thatched school is deplorable in every condition. Children mainly come for the food that is served. The teachers come mainly for the money and do not care about the kids or the school facilities.

The corrupt manager runs the school as a business for getting grants and making money from appointments. In the climax, the hero realizes his mistake from guilt which was seeded by his father and took form when the dilapidated school causes the death of 3 students. In the turn of events, Divakaran surrenders to the police for using a fake teaching certificate.

== Cast ==
- Mohanlal as Divakaran
- Menaka as Sujatha
- Jagathy Sreekumar as Nanu Mash
- Nedumudi Venu as Kunjan Nair, Head master
- Mamukkoya as Koya, teacher
- Sukumari as kalyanikutti, teacher
- Kunjandi as Govindankutty Mash, Divakaran's father
- Sreenivasan as Vijayan Mash
- Innocent as Chathukutti Nambiar, MLA
- K.P.A.C. Sunny as Achuthan Nambiar (School manager)
- Kozhikode Santha Devi as Divakaran's mother
- Paravoor Bharathan as Karyasthan
- Jagannatha Varma as AEO
- Kiran G. Nath
- Thodupuzha Vasanthi as Nambiar's wife

== Soundtrack ==
All lyrics are written by Chunakkara Ramankutty; all music is composed by Shyam.

No.	Title	Artist(s)	Length
1.	"Aamarameemarathil"	K. J. Yesudas, Choir
2.	"Ponnin Kinavukal"	K. J. Yesudas, Ashalatha
