= Ithile Vannavar =

- Directed by: P. Chandrakumar
- Written by: Salam
- Screenplay by: Salam
- Produced by: M. Mani
- Starring: Madhu; Sheela; Sukumaran; MG Soman
- Cinematography: Vasanth Kumar
- Edited by: G. Venkittaraman
- Music by: Shyam
- Production company: Sunitha Productions
- Distributed by: Sunitha Productions
- Release date: 25 July 1980
- Country: India
- Language: Malayalam

Ithile Vannavar is a 1980 Indian Malayalam-language film, directed by P. Chandrakumar and produced by M. Mani. The film stars Madhu, Sheela, MG Soman and Sukumaran. The film has musical score by Shyam.

== Cast ==
- Madhu as Rajan, police officer (double role)
- Sheela as Devi Menon
- Sukumaran as Venu
- M. G. Soman as Gopinath
- Ambika as Bindu
- Jagathy Sreekumar as Sankarankutty /Sankari
- Thikkurissy Sukumaran Nair as Devi's father
- Mala Aravindan
- Alam
- Renuchandra as Raji
- N.S Vanjiyoor
- T. P. Madhavan as madman
- Nalini as Raji
- Aryad Gopalakrishnan as Jayan
- Idavela Nanadhini
- Mini
- Sheema as dancer
- Sathyasheelan
- Babu

== Soundtrack ==
The music was composed by Shyam and the lyrics were written by Sathyan Anthikkad.

No.	Song	Singers	Lyrics	Length (m:ss)
1	"Ithile Iniyum Varoo"	K. J. Yesudas	Sathyan Anthikkad	
2	"Pancharathna"	Vani Jairam	Sathyan Anthikkad	
3	"Shaanthamaay Premasaagaram"	P. Jayachandran	Sathyan Anthikkad	
4	"Varumo Malarvanikalil"	Vani Jairam	Sathyan Anthikkad	
