= Ivide Ingane =

- Directed by: Joshiy
- Written by: Pappanamkode Lakshmanan
- Screenplay by: Pappanamkode Lakshmanan
- Produced by: Pratapachandran
- Starring: Ratheesh; Sukumaran; Seema; T. G. Ravi
- Edited by: K. Sankunni
- Music by: Shyam
- Release date: 13 September 1984
- Country: India
- Language: Malayalam

Ivide Ingane is a 1984 Indian Malayalam film, directed by Joshiy. The film stars Ratheesh, Sukumaran, Seema and T. G. Ravi in the lead roles. The film has musical score by Shyam.

== Cast ==
- Ratheesh as Jayan
- Sukumaran as Market Raju
- Seema as Ammini
- T. G. Ravi as Chandrasekharan
- Kunjandi as Velayudhan Pilla
- Prathapachandran as Matthew
- Chithra as Rema
- Jagathy Sreekumar as Kuttappan
- Sumithra as Elsy/Sumi
- V. D. Rajappan as Maniyan
- Bheeman Raghu as Sugunan
- Sukumari as Bharathiyamma
- Philomina as Raju's mother
- Kunchan as Appukuttan
- Master Rajakumaran Thampi
- Baby Sonia
- Rema Devi
- Vettoor Purushan

== Soundtrack ==
The music was composed by Shyam and the lyrics were written by Poovachal Khader.

No.	Song	Singers	Lyrics	Length (m:ss)
1	"Arayannatheril"	K. J. Yesudas, S. Janaki	Poovachal Khader	
2	"Thadiya Podiya"	S. Janaki	Poovachal Khader	
