= Aakrosh =

Aakrosh (lit. 'anger') may refer to:

- Aakrosh (1980 film), Govind Nihalani film
- Aakrosh (1998 film), Latif Binny film
- Aakrosh (2010 film), Priyadarshan film
- Aakrosham, a 1982 Malayalam-language film

== See also ==
- Aakrosh Divas (lit. 'Anger Day'), protest against the 2016 Indian banknote demonetisation
