= Kuyiline Thedi =

- Promotional poster
- Directed by: M. Mani
- Written by: Priyadarshan
- Screenplay by: Priyadarshan
- Produced by: M. Mani
- Starring: Rohini; Master Raghu; Sukumari; Mohanlal
- Cinematography: D. D. Prasad
- Edited by: V. P. Krishnan
- Music by: Shyam
- Production company: Sunitha Productions
- Distributed by: Sunitha Productions
- Release date: 25 February 1983
- Country: India
- Language: Malayalam

Kuyiline Thedi is a 1983 Indian Malayalam-language romantic drama film directed and produced by M. Mani. The film stars Rohini, Master Raghu, Sukumari and Mohanlal in the lead roles. The film has musical score by Shyam. The film was a major success at the box office. Mohanlal's performance as Thampurankutty was critically acclaimed and is considered one of his best antagonistic roles.

== Synopsis ==
A teenage boy Shyam, who is forced to leave home by maltreatment of stepmother reaches a hill station and meets a teenaged girl, Meenu. There is a villainous landlord, Thampuran Kutty, who happens to be fascinated by this girl. Jithu, Brother of Thampuran Kutty's wife is a close friend of Shyam and he supports their affection. Due to Thampuran Kutty's extramarital affairs, his wife, Chitra Thampatty, quarrels with him and she is killed by Thampuran Kutty by pushing her from the stairs. Then he approaches Meenu's mother and gets permission to marry Meenu by offering a huge sum to her mother. Shyam, who is employed as the cartman of the landlord is dismissed from the job and threatened to leave the place for his life. On the wedding dais, Jeethu, brother of late wife of landlord, Chitra Thampatty kills Thampuran Kutty and runs away with Meenu to hand her over to her lover. When they reach him, the disappointed boy, Shyam, is trying to commit suicide by banging his head to the huge bell of the abandoned temple (The folklore of the temple bell has been told to the boy by the girl during their happy days). Meenu runs towards the boy and both of them die as the temple bell thrashes their heads. Shocked, Jeethu breaks down to tears as the end credits roll.

== Cast ==
- Master Raghu as Shyam
- Rohini as Meenu
- Rani Padmini as Chithra Thampatti
- Sukumari as Kausalya
- Mohanlal as Thampurankutty
- Adoor Bhasi as Ganapathi Iyer
- Manavalan Joseph as Sankunni
- V. D. Rajappan as Vetri Pattar
- Master Manohar as Jithu
- Sathyakala as Parvathy
- Paravoor Bharathan
- Poojappura Ravi as Ramunni Master
- Noohu as Moidu

== Soundtrack ==
The music was composed by Shyam and still tops in demand.

No.	Song	Singers	Lyrics	Length (m:ss)
1	"Krishna Nee Varumo"	K. J. Yesudas, P. Jayachandran	Chunakkara Ramankutty	
2	"Mullavallikkudilil"	S. Janaki	Chunakkara Ramankutty	
3	"Mullavallikkudilil" (D) (Pulakathin)	K. J. Yesudas, S. Janaki	Chunakkara Ramankutty	
4	"Neelavaanam Poothuninnu"	K. J. Yesudas, Vani Jayaram, Chorus	Chunakkara Ramankutty	
5	"Paathiraa Thaarame"	K. J. Yesudas	Chunakkara Ramankutty	
6	"Sindoora Thilakavumaay"	K. J. Yesudas	Chunakkara Ramankutty	
7	"Sindoora Thilakavumaay" (Bit)	K. J. Yesudas	Chunakkara Ramankutty	
