= Bhagyalakshmi (actress) =

Indian actress

Bhagyasri
- Born: Bhagyalakshmi; 16 August 1972 (age 54); Chennai, Tamil Nadu, India
- Occupation: Actress
- Years active: 1982-1998; 2015–present
- Spouse: Vasudevan Mannadiyar (m. 2001)

Bhagyalakshmi, also known as Bhagyasri, is an Indian actress. She was a prominent actress in the 1980s, appearing in nearly 60 films in Malayalam, Tamil, Kannada, and Telugu films.

== Personal life ==
Bhagyalakshmi was born in a Tamil Brahmin family to Shivaram Iyer and Rajamani Ammal in Chennai. Her father was a Palakkad Iyer from Palakkad, while her mother was a Saurashtra Brahmin from Karaikudi. She has a younger brother Rohith Kumar, who is an engineer. She studied at Sacred Heart Matriculation School, now known as Presentation Convent, at Church Park, until the 10th grade, after which she dropped out of school to pursue an acting career. She learned classical dance from the Dhananjayans.

Her first Tamil movie was Deviyin Thiruvilayadal in 1982, and her first Malayalam movie was Asthram in 1983.

She married film producer Vasudevan Mannadiyar, a Malayali from Gujarat involved in the garment business, on 14 April 2001. They have a son, Viswajith. After her marriage Bhagyalakshmi retired from acting in the film industry and settled in Gujarat for 14 years. They currently reside in Chennai.

== Filmography ==
Year	Movie	Role	Language
1982	Deviyin Thiruvilayadal		Tamil
1983	Asthram		Malayalam
1984	Engine Nee Marakkum	Devi	Malayalam
1984	Paavam Poornima		Malayalam
1984	Paavam Krooran		Malayalam
1984	Manassariyaathe		Malayalam
1984	Ithiri Poove Chuvannapoove		Malayalam
1984	Parannu Parannu Parannu	Charulatha	Malayalam
1984	Nyayam Ketkiren		Tamil
1984	Nalamariya Aval		Tamil
1984	Shanthi Muhoortham		Tamil
1985	Janakeeya Kodathi		Malayalam
1985	Koodum Thedi		Malayalam
1985	Idanilangal		Malayalam
1985	Ezhumuthal Onpathuvare		Malayalam
1985	Njan Piranna Nattil		Malayalam
1985	Uyarum Njaan Naadaake	Manja	Malayalam
1985	Pacha Velicham		Malayalam
1985	Vande Mataram		Telugu
1985	Chain Jayapal		Tamil
1986	Love Story		Malayalam
1986	Aalorungi Arangorungi	Radha	Malayalam
1986	Niramulla Ravulkal	Saradha's sister	Malayalam
1986	Surabhi Yaamangal		Malayalam
1986	Arundivide Chodikkan		Malayalam
1986	Cabaret Dancer		Malayalam
1987	Nirabhedhangal		Malayalam
1987	Mangalyachaarthu		Malayalam
1987	Ponnu		Malayalam
1987	Valayal Satham		Tamil
1987	Kodi Parakuthu	Dhadha's love interest	Tamil
1987	Ore Ratham	Mercy	Tamil
1988	Agnichirakulla Thumpi		Malayalam
1988	Nyayam Kosam		Telugu
1989	Ashokante Ashwathykkuttikku		Malayalam
1989	Ashoka Chakravarthy	Anarkali	Telugu
1989	Thaya Tharama		Tamil
1990	Rao Gari Intlo Rowdy	Shanti	Telugu
1990	Aalay Pathu Malai Mathu		Tamil
1990	Sakthi Parasakthi		Tamil
1991	Pandirimancham	Seeta	Telugu
1992	Repati Koduku		Telugu
1992	Brundavanam	Thara	Telugu
1992	Rudra Thandava		Kannada
1993	Chinna Kannamma	Nurse Padma	Tamil
1995	Chinna Vathiyar	Bhagyasri	Tamil
1996	Mappillai Manasu Poopola	Vasanthi	Tamil
1998	Sri Ramulayya		Telugu
2019	Dharmapatini	Dr Jayalakshmi	Tamil

== Television ==
Title	Year	Channel	Role
Kalyana Parisu	2014-2018	Sun TV	Vimal's mother
Kairasi Kudumbam	2015-2017	Jaya TV	Anandhi
Apoorva Raagangal	2017-2018	Sun TV	Mariamma
Azhagu	2017-2018	Sun TV	Vijaya
Neelakuyil	2018–2019	Star Vijay	Chandramathi
Kalyana Veedu	2020	Sun TV	Selvarani
Roja	2022	Sun TV	Kokila
Siragadikka Aasai	2023–Present	Star Vijay	Parvathi
Lakshmi	2024	Sun TV	Mangalam
Moondru Mudichu	2024–2025	Sun TV	Usha
Vinodhini	2026	Sun TV	Parameshwari
