= Eden Thottam =

- Directed by: P Chandrakumar
- Written by: Kanam E. J.
- Screenplay by: Kanam E. J.
- Produced by: M. Mani
- Starring: Sukumari; Jayabharathi; MG Soman
- Cinematography: Vasanth Kumar
- Edited by: G. Venkittaraman
- Music by: Shyam
- Production company: Sunitha Productions
- Distributed by: Sunitha Productions
- Release date: 6 June 1980
- Country: India
- Language: Malayalam

Eden Thottam (transl. Garden of Eden) is a 1980 Indian Malayalam film, directed by P. Chandrakumar and produced by M. Mani. The film stars Sukumari, Jayabharathi and M. G. Soman in the lead roles. The film has musical score by Shyam.

== Cast ==
- Sukumari as Usha's mother
- Jayabharathi as Shantha
- Sankaradi as Rappai
- Sreelatha Namboothiri as Maami Chettathi
- Ambika as Usha
- KPAC Sunny as Varghese
- M. G. Soman as Thomaskutty
- Mala Aravindan as Rajappan
- T. P. Madhavan as Thomaskutty's father

== Soundtrack ==
The music was composed by Shyam and the lyrics were written by Sathyan Anthikkad.

No.	Song	Singers	Lyrics	Length (m:ss)
1	"Kinaavil Edanthottam" (F)	P. Susheela	Sathyan Anthikkad	
2	"Kinaavil Edanthottam" (M)	K. J. Yesudas	Sathyan Anthikkad	
