= Pacha Velicham =

- Directed by: M. Mani
- Written by: Cheri Viswanath; Thoppil Bhasi (dialogues)
- Screenplay by: Thoppil Bhasi
- Produced by: M. Mani
- Starring: Madhu; Shankar; Adoor Bhasi; Sankaradi
- Cinematography: C. E. Babu
- Edited by: V. P. Krishnan
- Music by: Shyam
- Production company: Sunitha Productions
- Distributed by: Sunitha Productions
- Release date: 26 February 1985
- Country: India
- Language: Malayalam

Pacha Velicham (transl. Green Light) is a 1985 Indian Malayalam-language film, directed and produced by M. Mani. The film stars Shankar, Madhu, Sukumari, Adoor Bhasi and Sankaradi. The film has musical score by Shyam.

== Synopsis ==
Mukundan, a railway office clerk, gets transferred to a remote railway station in Madras. One night while leaving from the station, he happens to meet Nandini, his father's sister's daughter, walking towards her house. She told that she got down from the train which had just halted there and is heading towards her house. As it was quite dark, she borrows his torch and asks him to get it back from her house the next day. Quite shocked and speechless, Mukundan lends out his torch. He then heads to the rented house, which was also owned by Nandini's husband - Retd. Major Nair.

Mukundan then skips to his old memories. He was in love with Nandini. Both his parents and Nandini's mother were interested in their marriage. Mukundan gets a job in the railway. Nandini's brother Surendran who was a workshop mechanic in Bangalore, however had other plans. He wanted to take Nandini to Bangalore for higher studies, and suggested that only after the studies were completed, they would think of her marriage. Nandini is taken to Bangalore by Surendran, and Mukundan joins his new job. Days later, Nandini's mother also leaves to Bangalore, and there were no updates since then. When Mukundan arrives for a week's leave, he was advised by his father to visit Bangalore to know their updates. On reaching Bangalore, Mukundan was informed by a dejected Nandini's mother that she is already married and has left for Madras with her husband.

Now Thankavelu, while bringing dinner for Mukundan to his rented house, experiences strange sounds and runs towards Mukundan. Mukundan joins a frightened Thankavelu on his return. Major Nair reaches his house after a trip, and is quite surprised to see a torch on the table, which is just below the portrait of Nandini hanging on the wall. The next day while Mukundan visits Major Nair's house to collect his torch, he is informed by Nair that Nandini is no more. She had died a year ago. Shocked by this, Mukundan finds difficult to believe it. Major Nair then recites the situation which made him marry Nandini.

Major was a neighbour of Surendran at Bangalore. He had lost one leg in a war, and was serving retirement life. He had enough of wealth. Surendran had planned to start a new workshop and so he exploited the relationship with Major for his selfish need by fixing his marriage with Nandini. Though Nandini had met the Major and informed him of her relationship with Mukundan, the Major was not willing to withdraw from the marriage, citing that he had already informed many and now it is not possible to withdraw. Though Nandini tried to elope, the Major traced and caught her with help of police. After the marriage, they got relocated to Madras. However, during the first night of marriage, the Major behaved rashly towards Nandhini for not mentally accepting him as her husband. And as a result Nandhini committed suicide by running towards a speeding train.

Mukundan used to see Nandini at times, and the station master Muhammed recommended him to visit a Psychiatrist, which he refuses. The Major kills a black cat, which used to haunt him often, ever since the death of Nandini, and buries it in his house premises. However he is shocked to see that black cat again in his house. Unable to bear all these, the Major shoots himself to death. Mukundan is also attracted by Nandini towards a running train, and he is also killed.

== Cast ==
- Madhu as Retd. Captain Nair
- Shankar as Mukundan, Railway Booking Clerk
- Asha as Nandinikutty, Mukundan's love interest, Captain Nair's wife and Ghost
- Soumini as Captain Nair's second wife
- Sankaradi as Mukundan's Father
- Santhakumari as Mukundan's Father
- Sukumari as Nandini's Mother
- K.P.A.C. Azeez as Surendran, Nandhini's Brother
- Adoor Bhasi as Station Master Muhammed
- V. D. Rajappan as Thankavelu
- Kuthiravattam Pappu as Priest
- Poojappura Ravi as Thankavelu's friend

Bhagyalakshmi

== Soundtrack ==
The music was composed by Shyam with lyrics by Chunakkara Ramankutty.

No.	Song	Singers	Lyrics	Length (m:ss)
1	"Athimarakkombathu"	K. J. Yesudas, K. S. Chithra	Chunakkara Ramankutty	
2	"Athimarakkombathu" (M)	K. J. Yesudas	Chunakkara Ramankutty	
3	"Swararagamaay"	S. Janaki	Chunakkara Ramankutty	
4	"Swararagamaay" (Horror)	S. Janaki	Chunakkara Ramankutty	
5	"Swararagamaay" (Pathos)	S. Janaki	Chunakkara Ramankutty	
