= Sabitha Anand =

Indian actress

- Occupation: Actress
- Years active: 1982–present
- Parent: J. A. R. Anand

Sabitha Anand is an Indian actress who works in Tamil and Malayalam movies and serials. She was one of the lead actresses in the 1980s. She is the daughter of J. A. R. Anand, an actor in Malayalam movies during the 1960s and 70s.

== Career ==
She made her debut as a heroine through M. Mani's Ente Kalithozhan (1984). She has acted as the female lead alongside popular male counterparts such as Mammotty, Mohanlal, Ratheesh, and Shankar. She has acted in more than 100 Malayalam films. Later she transitioned to supporting roles and Mother character roles and shifted her focus to Tamil cinema. She is currently concentrating on Tamil serials.

== Selected filmography ==
=== Tamil ===
Year	Title	Role	Notes
1982	Gopurangal Saivathillai		
1982	Ninaivellam Nithya		
1985	Hemavin Kadhalargal		
1986	Kaidhiyin Theerpu		
1987	Thaye Neeye Thunai		
1987	Chinna Poove Mella Pesu	Esther	
1988	Pattikaatu Thambi		
1988	Ennai Vittu Pogaathe	Lakshmi	
1988	Paravaigal Palavitham	Geetha	
1989	Thiruppu Munai	Chidambaram's wife	
1989	En Arumai Manaivi		
1990	Kavithai Paadum Alaigal		
1990	Vaazhkai Chakkaram	Thaaiyamma	
1990	Pudhiya Sarithiram		
1991	Idhaya Vaasal	Vaani's sister	
1992	Thalaivaasal	Saradha	
1992	Annan Ennada Thambi Ennada		
1992	Thangarasu		
1992	Chinna Thayee	Raasamma	
1993	Naalai Engal Kalyanam		
1993	Thangakkili		
1993	Madurai Meenakshi	Gomathi	
1993	Ulle Veliye	Rajalakshmi	
1993	Amaravathy	Arjun's aunty	
1993	Chinna Jameen	Amsaveni	
1994	Sakthivel	Chairman's wife	
1994	Thozhar Pandian	Shanmuganathan's wife	
1994	Veera Padhakkam	Mani's wife	
1994	Manju Virattu	Chellamma	
1994	Seeman	Meenakshi	
1995	Aakaya Pookal		
1995	Chandralekha	Fathima	
1995	Paattu Paadava	Janaki	
1996	Parambarai	Vijayakumar's first wife	
1996	Kadhal Kottai	Malliga	
1996	Poomani	Panchavarnam	
1997	Vallal	Selvi	
1997	Samrat	Samrat's mother	
1997	Mappillai Gounder	Shenbagam	
1998	Moovendhar	Vaidehi's sister	
1998	Vettu Onnu Thundu Rendu	Veerapandi's wife	
1998	Pudhumai Pithan	Bhavani	
1999	Kanave Kalayadhe	Manager's wife	
1999	Time	Dilip's mother	
2000	Ninaivellam Nee		
2000	Vaanathaippola	Janaki	
2000	Good Luck	Sr. Mary	
2000	Veeranadai		
2000	Maayi	Maayi's mother	
2000	Seenu	Janaki	
2001	Vaanchinathan	Abdul Khader's wife	
2001	Azhagana Naatkal	Guna's wife	
2002	Bala	Bhagyam	
2002	Samasthanam	Parama's wife	
2002	King		
2002	En Mana Vaanil	Ganesh's mother	
2002	Punnagai Desam	Ganesh's mother	
2002	Sundara Travels	Gayathri's mother	
2003	Paarai	Durairaj's mother	
2003	Alaudin	Mallika	
2004	Ramakrishna		
2004	Engal Anna	Easwaramurthy's wife	
2004	Sound Party	Sarasu	
2004	Chatrapathi		
2004	Amma Appa Chellam	Velamma	
2004	Meesai Madhavan	Amminiamma	
2005	Oru Kadhal Seiveer	Subha's mother	
2005	Selvam	Selvam's mother	
2006	Ilakkanam	Murugavel's wife	
2006	Nagareega Komali	Gopi's mother	
2006	Kusthi		
2006	Aattam	Meenatchi	
2006	Sasanam		
2006	Vathiyar	Cook	
2007	Lee		
2007	Ippadikku En Kadhal		
2007	Piragu	Sathya's mother	
2007	Vasantham Vanthachu	Chellamma	
2007	Thiru Ranga	Doctor	
2008	Nayagan		
2008	Madurai Ponnu Chennai Paiyan	Meenakshi	
2008	Thithikkum Ilamai	Kalyani	
2008	Vambuchanda	Lakshmi	
2008	Thotta	Nalina's mother	
2009	Vedappan	Deepika's mother	
2010	Kanagavel Kaaka		
2010	Neethana Avan	Meenakshi	
2010	Ithanai Naalai Engirunthai		
2011	Marudhavelu	Ponnuthayi	
2012	Mahaan Kanakku		
2012	Mittu		Short film
2013	Sandhithathum Sindhithathum	Kumaresan's mother	
2015	Vettayadu		
2016	Thagadu		
2016	Thiraikku Varadha Kathai	Sophia's mother	
2017	Saaya	Bharath's mother	
2017	Keikraan Meikkiran	Madhu's mother	
2021	V		
2024	Iru Manasu		

=== Malayalam ===
Year	Title	Role	Notes
1975	Mattoru Seetha		
1981	Sapthapadi		
1982	Aasha	Rasiya	
1982	Ayudham	Oppana dancer	
1982	Ponnum Poovum	Woman in the car	
1982	Thadaakam	Madhavi	
1982	Innalenkil Nale		
1983	Aaroodam	Malootty	
1983	Yudham	Radha	
1983	Aashrayam	Teacher	
1983	Ee Yugam		
1983	Mortuary		
1984	Unaroo	Mary	
1984	Muthodu Muthu	Sulochana	
1984	Ente Upasana	Nisha	
1984	Karimbu	Rejina	
1984	Aksharangal	Nalini	
1984	Chakkarayumma	Asha Thomas	
1984	Sandarbham	Usha	
1984	Ente Kalithozhan		
1984	Shabadham	Seetha	
1984	Kanamarayathu	Mercy	
1984	Athirathram		
1984	Ariyaatha Veethikal	Ambili	
1984	Oru Kochu Swapnam	Maggie	
1984	Arante Mulla Kochu Mulla	Kavitha	
1985	Guerrilla		
1985	Parannuyaran		
1985	Manya Mahajanangale	Suhra	
1985	Koodiyaattam		
1985	Kaattuthee		
1985	Saandham Bheekaram		
1985	Angadikkappurathu	Sainaba	
1985	Principal Olivil	Sreedevi	
1985	Scene No. 7	Ammini	
1985	Nulli Novikkathe		
1985	Vellarikka Pattanam	Shobha	
1985	Kaiyum Thlayum Purathidaruthe	Passenger	
1986	Atham Chithira Chothy	Lily	
1986	Kaveri	Elizabeth	
1986	Ente Shabdham	Laila	
1986	Love Story	Savithri	
1986	Njan Kathorthirikkum	Jameela	
1987	Uppu		
1987	Janagalude Sradhakku		
1987	Naalkavala	Leela	
1987	Kaanan Kothichu		
1987	Kilippattu		
1987	Yaagagni	Raasi	
1987	Manja Manthrangal	Lucie	
1987	Ithrayum Kaalam	Sainaba	
1988	Loose Loose Arappiri Loose	Shalini	
1988	Ormayil Ennum	Stella	
1988	1921	Ammukutty	
1988	Mrithyunjayam	Jessy	
1988	Bheekaran	Teacher	
1988	Dhwani	Kanakam	
1989	Ulsavapittennu	Indira	
1989	Chanakyan	Jessy	
1989	Najangalude Kochu Doctor		
1990	Orukkam		
1990	Prosecution		
1990	Commander		
1990	Kalikkalam	Suhra	
1991	Kadalorakkaattu	Ponnappan's wife	
1991	Parallel College	Radha	
1991	Bhoomika	Sarada	
1994	Sagaram Sakshi		
1994	Chukkan	Sindhu	
1994	Vidheyan	Omana	
1995	Aavarthanam		
1996	Kumkumacheppu	Devi	
1999	Paava		
2001	Ee Parakkum Thalika	Lakshmi	
2001	Kinavu Pole		
2002	Aasradyam Parayum		
2003	Chronic Bachelor	Saraswathi	
2003	Relax		
2004	Yaanam		
2007	Vinodayathra	Anupama's mother	
2008	Mayabazar	Maya's mother	
2008	Cycle	Gowri	
2008	Parunthu	Purushu's mother	
2011	Aazhakadal	Rosanna	
2013	Annayum Rasoolum		
2013	Thira		
2013	72 Model	Saraswathy	
2014	Homely Meals	Alan's mother	
2016	Girls	Sophia's mother	
2018	Njan Prakashan	Prakashan's mother	
2021	Kaalchilambu		
2023	A Ranjith Cinema	Ranjith's mother	
2025	Hridayapoorvam	Geetha	
2026	Prathichaya	Annamma Varghese	

=== Telugu ===
Year	Title	Role	Notes
2001	Simharasi	Narasimharaju's mother	
2008	Lakshmi Putrudu	Lakshmi	

== Television ==
Year	Serial	Role	Channel	Language	Notes
	Vaishaka Sandhya			Malayalam	
1991	Kadalpurathil	Philomina	DD Madras	Tamil	
1991	Rail Sneham	Sneha	DD Madras	Tamil	
	Mounam			Tamil	
1997–2001	Kokila Enge Pogiraal		Sun TV	Tamil	
2000–2003	Kavyanjali		Vijay TV	Tamil	
2003–2005	Omanathinkal Pakshi		Asianet	Malayalam	
2003–2007	Sorgam	Janaki	Sun TV	Tamil	
2006-2007	Malargal	Gandhimathi	Sun TV	Tamil	
2006–2007	Kolangal	Thillambal	Sun TV	Tamil	
2006	Penn	Anandhi	Sun TV	Tamil	
2009	Raja Rajeshwari		Sun TV	Tamil	
2009	Sivasakthi	Sivagami		Tamil	
2011–2013	Snehakoodu		Surya TV	Malayalam	
2012–2013	Thiyagam	Mahalakshmi	Sun TV	Tamil	
2012	Pillai Nila		Sun TV	Tamil	
2013–2018	Deivamagal	Saroja	Sun TV	Tamil	Won, Mylapore Academy Awards-Best actress negative
2014	Celebrity Kitchen	Guest	Puthuyugam TV	Tamil	With Priya
2015	Star Kitchen	Celebrity Guest	Vendhar TV	Tamil	3 episodes
2016–2017	Mappillai	Sharadha	Star Vijay	Tamil	Won, Vijay Television Awards for Best Mamiyar-Fiction
2018–2020	Naam Iruvar Namakku Iruvar (Season 1)	Gowri	Star Vijay	Tamil	
2018–2019	Oru Oorla Oru Rajakumari	Shenbagavalli	Zee Tamizh	Tamil	Replaced by Geetha Saraswathi
2019–2020	Tamil Selvi	Shenbagavalli	Sun TV	Tamil	
2019–2020	Rettai Roja	Deivanai	Zee Tamizh	Tamil	
2020–2022	Naam Iruvar Namakku Iruvar (Season 2)	Naachiyar	Star Vijay	Tamil	
2020	Senthoora Poove	Naachiyar	Star Vijay	Tamil	
2021–2022	Anbe Sivam	Lakshmi	Zee Tamizh	Tamil	
2023	Peranbu	Krishnaveni	Zee Tamizh	Tamil	
2023–2024	Nala Damayanthi	Parvathi	Zee Tamizh	Tamil	
2023–2024	Mr. Manaivi	Gunavathi	Sun TV	Tamil	
