= Aanakkorumma =

1985 film

- Directed by: M. Mani
- Written by: Vijayan
- Produced by: M. Mani
- Starring: Ratheesh; Adoor Bhasi; Sankaradi; Menaka
- Cinematography: C. E. Babu
- Edited by: V. P. Krishnan
- Music by: Shyam; V. D. Rajappan
- Production company: Sunitha Productions
- Distributed by: Sunitha Productions
- Release date: 1 November 1985
- Country: India
- Language: Malayalam

Aanakkorumma is a 1985 Indian Malayalam film, directed, and produced by M. Mani. The film stars Ratheesh, Adoor Bhasi, Sankaradi, and Menaka in the lead roles. The film has a musical score by Shyam and V. D. Rajappan.

== Cast ==
- Ratheesh as Devan
- M. G. Soman as Swami/Police Officer
- Adoor Bhasi as Raman Nair
- Santhosh as Vikraman
- Sankaradi as Potti
- Menaka as Devi
- Baby Shalini as Bindu
- V. D. Rajappan as Balan
- Kunchan as Govindan
- Thrissur Elsy as Meenakshi
- Poojappura Ravi as Narayana Pilla
- Paravoor Bharathan as Police officer
- Thikkurussy Sukumaran Nair as Minister
- KPAC Azeez as Police Inspector
- Anuradha as Anitha

== Soundtrack ==
The music was composed by Shyam and V. D. Rajappan and the lyrics were written by V. D. Rajappan and Chunakkara Ramankutty.

No.	Song	Singers	Lyrics	Length (m:ss)
1	"Kanna Kaarmukil Varnna" (Parody)	Ambili, V. D. Rajappan	Chunakkara Ramankutty, V. D. Rajappan	
2	"Manikanda Manikanda"	Vani Jairam	Chunakkara Ramankutty	
3	"Muthaninja Therirangi"	P. Susheela	Chunakkara Ramankutty	
