= Aarodum Parayaruthu =

1985 film

- Directed by: A. J. Rojas
- Written by: Vijayan
- Screenplay by: Vijayan
- Starring: Rohini; Shankar; Bhagyalakshmi (actress)
- Cinematography: Divakara Menon
- Edited by: Ayyappan
- Music by: P. C. Susi
- Production company: Giri Manju Productions
- Distributed by: Giri Manju Productions
- Release date: 15 August 1985
- Country: India
- Language: Malayalam

Aarodum Parayaruthu is a 1985 Indian Malayalam film, directed by A. J. Rojas. The film stars Rohini, Shankar, Siddique and Sukumaran in the lead roles. The film has musical score by P. C. Susi.

== Cast ==
- Sukumaran
- Rohini
- Shankar
- Bhagyalakshmi (actress)
- Unnimary
- Vijayan
- Babitha Justin
- Balan K. Nair
- Siddique
- Kothuku Nanappan
- Kuthiravattam Pappu
- Lalithasree
- Sreenath

== Soundtrack ==
The music was composed by P. C. Susi and the lyrics were written by Poovachal Khader and Malloor Ramakrishnan Nair.

No.	Song	Singers	Lyrics	Length (m:ss)
1	"Enthe Sreepadmanaabha"	K. J. Yesudas	Poovachal Khader	
2	"Manavaalan"	Latha Parassala	Poovachal Khader	
3	"Sindoorasandhyayil Aaraadi"	K. J. Yesudas, Latha Parassala	Malloor Ramakrishnan Nair	
4	"Vinnil Theliyum"	K. J. Yesudas	Poovachal Khader	
