= Aanayum Ambaariyum =

1978 film directed by Crossbelt Mani

- Poster
- Directed by: Crossbelt Mani
- Screenplay by: C. P. Antony
- Starring: Vincent; Kamalamma; Leela; Ravikumar; Sudheer
- Cinematography: E. N. Balakrishnan
- Edited by: Chakrapani
- Music by: Shyam
- Production company: Rose Movies
- Distributed by: Rose Movies
- Release date: 14 January 1978
- Country: India
- Language: Malayalam

Aanayum Ambaariyum is a 1978 Indian Malayalam film, directed by Crossbelt Mani. The film stars Vincent, Kamalamma, Leela, Ravikumar, and Sudheer in the lead roles. The film has musical score by Shyam.

== Cast ==
- Vincent
- Sudheer
- Ravikumar
- Kamalamma
- Leela
- Kavitha

== Soundtrack ==
The music was composed by Shyam and the lyrics were written by Bharanikkavu Sivakumar and Kaniyapuram Ramachandran.

No.	Song	Singers	Lyrics	Length (m:ss)
1	"Hari Om Bhakshanadaayakane"	K. J. Yesudas, P. Jayachandran, K. P. Brahmanandan	Bharanikkavu Sivakumar, Kaniyapuram Ramachandran	
2	"Kandanaal Muthal"	S. Janaki	Bharanikkavu Sivakumar, Kaniyapuram Ramachandran	
3	"Njaan Ninne Kinaavu Kandu"	K. J. Yesudas, Chorus	Bharanikkavu Sivakumar, Kaniyapuram Ramachandran	
4	"Vasanthathin Theril"	K. J. Yesudas	Bharanikkavu Sivakumar, Kaniyapuram Ramachandran	
