= Andhi Mayakkam =

- Directed by: Banudasan
- Written by: Banudasan
- Produced by: A. V. Raja Reddiyar
- Starring: Manoj; Vinoth; Vanitha Krishnachandran; Suvita; Rani Padmini
- Cinematography: Ashok Choudhary
- Edited by: M. Kesavan
- Music by: Shyam
- Production company: Yuva Raja Pictures
- Release date: 18 September 1981
- Country: India
- Language: Tamil

Andhi Mayakkam (transl. Twilight faint) is a 1981 Indian Tamil-language romance film written and directed by Banudasan. The film stars Manoj, Vinoth, Vanitha Krishnachandran, Suvita and Rani Padmini. It was released on 18 September 1981.

== Cast ==
- Manoj as Prabhu
- Vinoth as Sanjeev
- Vanitha as Manjula
- Suvita as Indra
- Rani Padmini as Stella
- Gandhimathi

== Soundtrack ==
The soundtrack was composed by Shyam. Lyrics were written by Vairamuthu.

Track listing
No.	Title	Singer(s)	Length
1.	"Poove Vaa"	S. P. Balasubrahmanyam
2.	"Moodi Vecha"	Malaysia Vasudevan, Vani Jairam
3.	"Aatha Vandhen"	S. Janaki
