= Kanavugal Karpanaigal =

- Directed by: A. L. S. Kannappan
- Screenplay by: A. L. S. Kannappan
- Story by: Robert–Rajasekar
- Produced by: V. Thiagarajan; V. Thamilazhagan
- Starring: Sarath Babu; Roopa; Rani Padmini
- Cinematography: R. M. Ramesh
- Edited by: Annadurai
- Music by: Gangai Amaran
- Production company: ALS Enterprises
- Release date: 14 May 1982
- Country: India
- Language: Tamil

Kanavugal Karpanaigal (transl. Dreams and imaginations) is a 1982 Indian Tamil-language film directed by A. L. S. Kannappan, starring Sarath Babu, Roopa and Rani Padmini. It was released on 14 May 1982.

== Cast ==
- Sarath Babu
- Roopa
- Rani Padmini

== Soundtrack ==
The music was composed by Gangai Amaran. The song "Pillai Prayathile" is set to the raga Hamir Kalyani.

Track listing
No.	Title	Lyrics	Singer(s)	Length
1.	"Vellampole Thullum"	Ku. Ma. Balasubramaniam	S. P. Balasubrahmanyam, Poorani	4:40
2.	"Thendral Oru Thaalam"	Mu. Paavanan	P. Jayachandran	4:30
3.	"Potten Oru"	Kannadasan	Malaysia Vasudevan	4:47
4.	"Pillai Prayathile"	Mahakavi Bharathi	Deepan Chakravarthy, Roopa Devi	3:15
5.	"Kanvazhi Nenjil"	Manimozhi	Deepan Chakravarthy	1:29
Total length:				18:41

== Reception ==
Kalki wrote dreams and imaginations are fleeting so is this film.
