= Enikkum Oru Divasam =

- Directed by: Sreekumaran Thampi
- Written by: Sreekumaran Thampi
- Produced by: Sreekumaran Thampi
- Starring: Mohanlal; Adoor Bhasi; Nedumudi Venu; Seema
- Cinematography: C. Ramachandra Menon
- Edited by: K. Narayanan
- Music by: Shyam
- Production company: Bhavani Rajeswari
- Distributed by: Central Pictures
- Release date: 21 October 1982
- Country: India
- Language: Malayalam

Enikkum Oru Divasam (transl. A day for me too) is a 1982 Indian Malayalam-language comedy film written, directed and produced by Sreekumaran Thampi. The film stars Mohanlal, Adoor Bhasi, Nedumudi Venu, and Seema. The music for the film was composed by Shyam, Thampi also wrote lyrics for the film's songs. The film was a commercial success and is a landmark film in Mohanlal's career for featuring his first major leading role (hero).

== Cast ==
- Mohanlal as Thutimon Babu
- Adoor Bhasi as Ouseph
- Nedumudi Venu as Vaasu
- Seema as Chandrika
- Vanitha Krishnachandran as Swapna
- Rajkumar Sethupathi as Hamsa
- Nithya as Usha
- Lalu Alex as Prathapan
- Meena as Pathumma
- Kundara Johnny as S. I. Jacob
- Poojappura Ravi as Thankappan
- Paravoor Bharathan as Chandrika's father
- Bhagyalakshmi as Rajamma
- Roopa as Molykutty
- KPAC Azeez as DYSP John Samuel
- Shivaji as Salim
- Thodupuzha Radhakrishnan as Mammootty
- Vijaya Lakshmi as Muthassi
- Master Rajamohan Thampi as Shuppamani
- Pushpa as Radha

== Soundtrack ==
The music is composed by Shyam and the lyrics for the songs were written by Sreekumaran Thampi. The soundtrack album was released on 11 January 1982 by Saregama.

Enikkum Oru Divasam (Original Motion Picture Soundtrack)
| No. | Title | Singer(s) | Length |
|---|---|---|---|
| 1. | "Anpolikku Koluthi Vacha" | K. J. Yesudas | 4:29 |
| 2. | "Guruviney Thedi" | P. Susheela, Vani Jairam | 4:55 |
| 3. | "Roohinte Karyam Museebath" | K. J. Yesudas, S. P. Balasubrahmanyam | 7:58 |
