= Ponnu =

- Directed by: P. G. Vishwambharan
- Written by: A. R. Mukesh; Kaloor Dennis (dialogues)
- Produced by: Royal Achankunju
- Starring: Jagathy Sreekumar; Bhagyalakshmi; Thilakan; Ashokan
- Cinematography: C.E. Babu
- Edited by: G.Venkittaraman
- Music by: Ouseppachan
- Production company: Royal Films
- Distributed by: Royal Films
- Release date: 5 June 1987
- Country: India
- Language: Malayalam

Ponnu is a 1987 Indian Malayalam film, directed by P. G. Vishwambharan and produced by Royal Achankunju. The film stars Jagathy Sreekumar, Innocent, Thilakan and Ashokan. The film's score was composed by Ouseppachan.

== Cast ==
- Jagathy Sreekumar
- Innocent as Bhargavan, tailor
- Thilakan as Achuthan Thattan
- Ashokan as Unni, Achuthan's son
- Bhagyalakshmi
- Vineeth
- Sithara as Ammu
- Kalaranjini
- Shari
- Thanuja
- Jayalalithaa

== Soundtrack ==
The music was composed by Ouseppachan with lyrics by P. Bhaskaran.

No.	Song	Singers	Lyrics	Length (m:ss)
1	"Kaarmukilin"	K. J. Yesudas	P. Bhaskaran	
2	"Maanathe Thattaante"	K. S. Chithra	P. Bhaskaran	
