= Kaiyum Thlayum Purathidaruthe =

Kaiyum Thalayum Purathidaruthu
- Directed by: P. Sreekumar
- Written by: Thoppil Bhasi
- Screenplay by: Thoppil Bhasi
- Starring: Mukesh; Devan; Sabitha Anand; Sukumari
- Cinematography: Vipin Das
- Edited by: P. R. Nair
- Music by: Raveendran
- Production company: Devikshethra
- Distributed by: Devikshethra
- Release date: 5 November 1985
- Country: India
- Language: Malayalam

Kaiyum Thalayum Purathidaruthu is a 1985 Indian Malayalam film, directed by P. Sreekumar. The film stars Mukesh, Devan, Sabitha Anand and Sukumari in the lead roles. The film has musical score by Raveendran. The film based on famous drama of K.P.A.C written by Thoppil Bhasi as same title

== Cast ==
- Mukesh as Passenger
- Devan as Mahadevan
- Sabitha Anand as Passenger
- Sukumari as Narayani
- Nedumudi Venu as Secretary
- Shubha as Leela
- Bharath Gopi as Conductor
- Cochin Haneefa as Maneesh
- James as Passenger
- Kothuku Nanappan as President
- Kunjandi as Politician
- Kuthiravattam Pappu as Appu
- Lalithasree as Gouri
- Nellikode Bhaskaran as Kittummavan
- Poojappura Radhakrishnan as Passenger
- Poojappura Ravi as Police
- Ragini as Sudha
- Rajam K. Nair as Leela's mother
- Rasheed as Police Inspector
- Santhakumari as Sharada
- Thodupuzha Vasanthi as Vanitha Member

== Soundtrack ==
The music was composed by Raveendran and the lyrics were written by Mullanezhi and Poovachal Khader.

No.	Song	Singers	Lyrics	Length (m:ss)
1	"Aakaasha Neelima"	K. J. Yesudas	Mullanezhi	
2	"Aathira Thirumuttathu"	K. J. Yesudas, K. S. Chithra	Mullanezhi	
3	"Ambalappoove Nin"	S. Janaki	Poovachal Khader	
4	"Manthramurangum"	K. J. Yesudas	Mullanezhi	
