= Appa Haja =

Indian actor

- Born: January 1, 1970 (age 56); Ernakulam, Kerala, India
- Occupation: Actor
- Years active: 1986–present
- Notable work: Kakkothikkavile Appooppan Thaadikal, In Harihar Nagar, The King, Kottayam Kunjachan, Aniyan Bava Chetan Bava Ganagandharvan

Appa Haja (also known as Haja Husain) (born 1 January 1970) is an Indian actor who works in the Malayalam film industry. He made his acting debut with the film Ennennum Kannettante in 1986 He later gained wider recognition with Kakkothikkavile Appooppan Thaadikal (1988). He is known for appearing in character and supporting roles in more than three decades of Malayalam cinema.

== Early life ==
Appa Haja was born in Ernakulam, Kerala, and completed his education at St. Albert's College, Ernakulam. He resides in Thiruvananthapuram, Kerala.

== Career ==
Appa Haja began his film career in 1986 with Ennennum Kannettante and in 1988 he acted in Kakkothikkavile Appooppan Thaadikal. He went on to appear in notable Malayalam films including In Harihar Nagar (1990), Kottayam Kunjachan (1990), The King (1995), and Ganagandharvan (2019).

He is widely known for portraying police officers, supporting characters, and comic roles across commercial and art-house films.

== Selected Filmography ==
- 1986 -Ennennum Kannettante as Gopu
- 1987 -Vazhiyorakazchakal
- 1987 -Mahayanam
- 1988 – Kakkothikkavile Appooppan Thaadikal
- 1988 – Sangham as Alex
- 1989 – The News as Venu
- 1990 – Kottayam Kunjachan as Pothan
- 1990 – In Harihar Nagar as Cherian
- 1990 – Ee Thanutha Veluppan Kalathu as Vijayan
- 1990 – Mounam Sammadham as Natarajan (Tamil movie)
- 1990 – Marupuram as Binoy's Friend
- 1991 – Anaswaram as Williams
- 1991 –Kakkathollayiram
- 1992 – Kauravar as Police Officer
- 1995 – The King as Madhu
- 1995 – Aniyan Bava Chetan Bava as Dasappan
- 1995 –Sainyam as Kannan
- 1995 – Kaatttile Thadi Thevarude Ana as Nandakumar
- 1997 – Janathipathyam as Anantharaman
- 1998 – Sreekrishnapurathe Nakshathrathilakkam as Director of Yamuna's Movie
- 2009 – 2 Harihar Nagar as SI Cherian
- 2009 – Utharaswayamvaram as Jayadevan
- 2009 – Kappal Muthalaali as Archeologist
- 2010 – Shikkar as Chacko
- 2010 – Body Guard as Rajeevan
- 2010 – In Ghost House Inn as SI Cheriyan
- 2010 – Marykkundoru Kunjaadu as Kunjachan
- 2010 – College Days as SI Vijayakumar
- 2011 – Makeup Man as CI James
- 2011 – China Town as ACP Sandeep Kumar IPS
- 2012 –Kunjaliyan as Vikraman
- 2019 – Ganagandharvan as Ganeshan, Temple committee president
- 2019 – Jack & Daniel as Hisbullah
- 2020 – Big Brother as Karthikeyan
- 2022 – Karnan Napoleon Bhagath Singh
