= Kottayam Kunjachan =

Malayalam movie

- Poster
- Directed by: T. S. Suresh Babu
- Written by: Dennis Joseph (screenplay); Muttathu Varkey (story)
- Produced by: M. Mani
- Starring: Mammootty; Ranjini; Innocent; K.P.A.C. Lalitha; Sukumaran; Prathapachandran; Babu Antony
- Cinematography: Anandakuttan
- Edited by: G. Venkataraman
- Music by: Shyam
- Production company: Sunitha Productions
- Distributed by: Aroma
- Release date: 15 March 1990
- Running time: 165 min
- Country: India
- Language: Malayalam

Kottayam Kunjachan is a 1990 Indian Malayalam-language action comedy film directed by T. S. Suresh Babu and written by Dennis Joseph, loosely based on a novel titled "Veli" by Muttathu Varkey. It stars Mammootty in the title role as Kunjachan, with Ranjini, Innocent, KPAC Lalitha, Sukumaran, Babu Antony, and Prathapachandran appearing in supporting roles. Produced by M. Mani, the plot was set in the Kottayam-Catholic backdrop in Kerala, with characters speaking the native Kottayam dialect. The film and its title character Kunjachan went on to achieve cult status in the years following its release.

== Plot ==
Mikhael is a family man and good Christian who lives in the mostly tranquil village of Odaangara, with his wife Aleyamma. They have two daughters, Mollykutty and Susie and a son, Kuttappan. They have been involved in a long-standing dispute with their neighbour, Kanjirappalli Paappan, who wants to buy their land so that his bungalow would have a better front view and an access road to his property. Paappan's ruthless son, Jimmy is all for evicting them by force, while Paappan is wary of what Aleyamma's siblings, the Uppukandam Brothers- infamous thugs might do in retaliation. When negotiations fail, Paappan resorts to underhanded tactics and scuttles Mollykutty's marriage proposal to Kuzhiyil Joy and beats up Mikhael who questions it. Aleyamma gets her brothers involved, and Paappan and his son are beaten and humiliated by the Uppukandam brothers, led by Korah the eldest. Later, Joy visits Mollykutty and expresses his interest in her.

Meanwhile, 'Kottayam' Kunjachan, an erstwhile thug, has just been released from jail. He has served a sentence of 7 years, for killing a man in a fight gone bad. He makes a dramatic entrance to Kottayam town and goes to collect his promised compensation. After an altercation with his previous employers, he is arrested and later bailed out by his guardian, a Christian priest who found him as an infant in a garbage heap, and raised him as his own. Following his father's advice, he leaves Kottayam and its bad influences for Odaangara. He starts a technical institute, accompanied by Bosco, his assistant. He generally endears himself to the village populace. It is there that he meets Mikhael and his wife, and gets in their good books by rescuing Mollykutty from a kidnap attempt by Jimmy and the gang. Aleyamma convinces Mikhael to rent out their outhouse to Kunjachan, as a deterrent from further attacks by Paappan or Jimmy. Mikhael then convinces Kunjachan to go to confession, and start living as a good Christian.

Kunjachan takes a liking to Molly, who despises him for his past. However, when her parents attempt her to coerce her into another marriage, Molly has Susie enlist Kunjachan's help to scuttle it, which he does masterfully. Kunjachan assumes that she returns his affections. His attempts to talk to Molly are mistaken for a rape attempt by Aleyamma. Mikhael throws him out and Kunjachan is too shocked to react. He is later beaten up by the Uppukandam brothers. Molly doesn't intervene, and she is reprimanded by Susie who realizes that Molly has used Kunjachan. Shortly afterwards, Mikhael and Korah are ambushed and killed by Jimmy and Kunjachan is the prime suspect. Kunjachan goes into hiding, and angrily confronts Molly and Susie when he gets an opportunity. Molly is aghast that Joy never showed up in her time of need and throws herself at Kunjachan's mercy. He learns that Aleyamma is missing, and Kuttappan, her son has gone in search. He convinces them that he is innocent, and goes off to find Aleyamma. He manages to rescue her and her son from Jimmy's thugs, but returns to find Molly and Susie missing and the rest of the Uppukandam brothers on the scene. They learn after beating up Paappan that the women have been taken to their plantation by Jimmy, and mount a rescue mission.

Molly and Susie are rescued in the nick of time by Kunjachan, who consoles Molly after her near-rape by Jimmy. The next morning, Kunjachan is visited at his institute by the Brothers. He fears another confrontation, but they reveal that they are there to propose Molly's marriage to Kunjachan.

== Cast ==
- Mammootty as Kottayam Kunjachan, Kunjachayan
- Ranjini as Mollykutty
- Innocent as Koonammoochi Michael
- KPAC Lalitha as Uppukandam Aleyamma
- Usha as Susy
- Jose Prakash as Priest
- Sukumaran as Uppukandam Korah, Korachayan
- Prathapachandran as Kanjirappally Pappan
- Babu Antony as Jimmy Pappan
- K. B. Ganesh Kumar as Uppukandam Mathen
- Appa Haja as Uppukandam Pothen
- Zainuddin as Kumarakom Kochu Pappi
- Baiju as Bosco
- Mala Aravindan as Anthru
- Yadukrishnan as Kuttapan
- Adoor Bhavani as 'Maramkeri' Mariamma
- Ravi Vallathol as Kuzhiyil Roy
- Jagathy Sreekumar as Konayil Kochappi
- Kuthiravattom Pappu as Kuzhiyil Kochu
- Kollam Thulasi as Anthrayos
- Kunchan as Kuttyappan
- Jagannathan as Bernard, the sexton
- Jagannatha Varma as B. Ramanatha Reddiar
- Krishnankutty Nair as Pachakulam Vasu

== Production ==
The screenplay was loosely based on a novel titled 'Veli' written by Muttathu Varkey. The protagonist character Kunjachan, played by Mammootty, was adapted from the antagonist character of the same name in the novel. It was Muttathu Varkey's literary style that inspired the makers to feature the Kottayam accent in the movie. Varkey wrote his novel in a complete regional dialect. As a person who hails from Ettumanoor village of Kottayam district, screenwriter Dennis Joseph felt writing dialogues for characters easy and familiar to his native style. According to Joseph, the five years long graduate education at Deva Matha College, Kuravilangad and the hostel life of there also helped him to form the dialogues more truthfully. He said that the character of 'Kuttappayi' from the film Sangham (1987) was also created by him in the same pattern. Mammootty whose native place also belongs to the Kottayam district could be brought in the accent with perfection. Mammootty said, "I am from the northern edge of Kottayam. Therefore, the accent has never influenced me, but I have absorbed it." Mammootty received the whole script from Dennis Joseph before the filming began.

Dennis Joseph, being busy with other projects, never visited the set during filming; however, to help the director and associates understand the various characters' accent and slang properly, Joseph took 3 days and 10 audio cassettes to record the entire screenplay in his voice. These cassettes were used a reference during the entirety of the filming schedule, backed with guidance from Mammootty.

Though the plot is based on Kottayam, the producer M. Mani wanted to shoot the film in Thiruvananthapuram. The makers found the village Amboori, near Neyyattinkara in Thiruvananthapuram district. The place was exactly look-alike a village in Kottayam with the features resembling such as rubber and black pepper plantations, big churches, unpaved roads, etc. The place was shot as 'Odaangara', the fictional village in the film.

== Release ==
The film was released on 15 March 1990.

== Box office ==
The film was major commercial success. It had a box office collection of 4.2 crores. The film was the third highest-grossing Malayalam film of the year 1990. The film ran over 200 days in theatres.

== Soundtrack ==
Music: Shyam
Lyrics: Chunakkara Ramankutty

- Ee Neelaravil - K. J. Yesudas
- Hridayavaniyile - K. J. Yesudas, Sindhu Devi
- Manjaninja Mamalakal - K. J. Yesudas
