= Thimingalam =

- Directed by: Crossbelt Mani
- Starring: Shankar; Balan K. Nair; K. P. Ummer; K. R. Vijaya
- Cinematography: E. N. Balakrishnan
- Edited by: Chakrapani
- Music by: G. Devarajan
- Production company: Dolphin Movies
- Distributed by: Dolphin Movies
- Release date: 25 April 1983
- Country: India
- Language: Malayalam

Thimingalam (transl. Whale) is a 1983 Indian Malayalam film, directed by Crossbelt Mani. The film stars Shankar, Balan K. Nair, K. P. Ummer and K. R. Vijaya in the lead roles. The film has musical score by G. Devarajan.

== Cast ==
- Shankar as Vijayan
- Balan K. Nair as Kurup
- K. P. Ummer as Menon
- K. R. Vijaya as Devamma
- Kuthiravattam Pappu as Sankarankutty
- Raveendran as Venu
- Lalu Alex as Gopan
- Poojappura Ravi as Chacko
- Bheeman Raghu as Peter
- Manochithra as Reetha
- Sukumari as Bhanumathi
- Devi as Rosily
- Sunanda as Anitha
- V. D. Rajappan as Union Secretary

== Soundtrack ==
The music was composed by G. Devarajan and the lyrics were written by Chunakkara Ramankutty.

No.	Song	Singers	Lyrics	Length (m:ss)
1	"Aananda Nritham Njaanaadi"	P. Madhuri	Chunakkara Ramankutty	
2	"Malaro Madhuvo"	K. J. Yesudas, P. Susheela	Chunakkara Ramankutty	
3	"Thaarunyam Thazhukiyunarthiya"	P. Jayachandran	Chunakkara Ramankutty	
4	"Thankatheril Vaa"	K. J. Yesudas	Chunakkara Ramankutty	
