= Janathipathyam =

- VCD cover
- Directed by: K. Madhu
- Written by: A. K. Sajan; A. K. Santhosh
- Produced by: M. Mani
- Starring: Suresh Gopi; Urvashi; Balachandra Menon; Vani Viswanath
- Cinematography: Saloo George
- Edited by: K. Sankunni
- Music by: Shyam
- Production company: Sunitha Productions
- Distributed by: Sunitha Productions
- Release date: 17 September 1997
- Country: India
- Language: Malayalam

Janathipathyam (transl. Democracy) is a 1997 Indian Malayalam-language film, directed by K. Madhu and produced by M. Mani. The film stars Suresh Gopi, Urvashi, Balachandra Menon, and Vani Viswanath in lead roles.

== Plot ==
The movie opens with the communist party winning the state election in Kerala, but the Chief Ministerial candidate has lost the election. The party chief proposes the name of Ramadevan Nayanar aka RD Nayanar, a former Kerala cadre IPS officer, who resigned from the service due to the influence of the villains, including some in the police -IGP Kaimal and DGP Pillai and MP Gopinathan and some other political and business tycoons. RD returns to Kerala from Calcutta and takes over as the Chief Minister, after which he uses his powers to take down his enemies with the help of his wife Indira IAS, and his former colleagues in the police force.

== Cast ==
- Suresh Gopi as SSP Ramadevan Nayanar IPS
  - Former Assistant Commissioner of Police, He later became the Chief Minister of Kerala
- Urvashi as District Collector Indira Menon IAS, RD Nayanar's wife
- Balachandra Menon as Krishnamoorthy IPS
  - Former Inspector General
- Vani Viswanath as late Police Commissioner Maya Pillai IPS who was brutally murdered
- Aroma Sunilkumar as CI Xavier Idikkula
- Maniyanpilla Raju as SI Abootty
- Rajan P. Dev as DGP Padmanabhan Pillai IPS
- Devan as Vishakom Thirunal Prathapa Varma of Ilyaidathu Kovilakom
- Saikumar as K.Gopinathan Menon
- Thikkurussi Sukumaran Nair as Valiya Thirumeni of Ilyaidathu Kovilakom
- Karamana Janardhanan Nair as Kannan Menon, Party Leader and Indira's father
- Shivaji as Thirumalpadu
- K. P. A. C. Sunny as Moosakutty K.H
- Poojappura Ravi as Sathyan Nadar, Traffic police officer
- TP Madhavan as IG Kaimal IPS
- Babu Namboothiri as Bhattathirippadu, Party Secretary
- Kozhikode Narayanan Nair as Musaliar
- Manju Pillai as Thirumalpadu's wife
- Aranmula Ponnamma as Thirumalpadu's mother
- Bobby Kottarakkara as Cherian Issac, journalist
- Appa Haja as Anantharaman
- Eliyas Babu as Augustine, Ex-Chief Minister of Kerala
- Ravi Vallathol as Justice Krishnanunni
- Jose Pellissery as Bank Manager Eappachan
- Biyon as Kuttan Thampuran of Adoor Kovilakom
