= Rani Padmini (actress) =

Indian actress

- Born: 1962; Madras, Tamil Nadu, India
- Died: 15 October 1986 (aged 23–24)
- Cause of death: Homicide
- Occupation: Actor
- Years active: 1980–1986
- Parents: Chaudri; Indirakumari

Rani Padmini (1962 – 15 October 1986) was an Indian actress during the 1980s in Malayalam, Tamil, Kannada, Telugu and a few Hindi films. She entered the film field with Sangharsham and played notable roles in Parankimala, Sharam, Bandham and Kilikonchal.

She was murdered on 15 October 1986 at her home, along with her mother, by three of her employees.

== Personal life ==
She was born to Chaudri and Indirakumari at Anna Nagar, Madras. She was their only child.

== Death ==
On the morning of 15 October 1986, Rani Padmini's driver, Jebaraj, watchman Lakshmi Narasimhan alias Kutty, and cook, Ganeshan attacked her mother Indirakumari and killed her. Hearing her mother's screams, Rani Padmini came to investigate but was overpowered by the men and murdered. The three were, however, arrested and sentenced to life terms. Rani Padmini's murder caused ripples all over Tamil Nadu and Kerala and it was alleged that the three men were arrested in order to protect a high-profile person who was in close contact with Rani Padmini.

== Filmography ==
=== Malayalam ===
Year	Title	Role	Notes
1981	Vilangum Veenayum		
1981	Sangharsham	Lekha	
1981	Thenum Vayambum	Aasha	
1981	Thaaraavu	Kaarthu	
1981	Thushaaram	Shobha	
1981	Parankimala	Sreedevi	
1981	Kathayariyathe	Usha	
1982	Aasha	Neena Cheriyan	
1982	Marupacha	Rani	
1982	Aa Divasam		
1982	Aakrosham	Rekha	
1982	Anuraagakkodathi	Mini	
1982	Vidhichathum Kothichathum	Usha	
1982	Sharam	Anitha	
1982	Bheeman		
1983	Nizhal Moodiya Nirangal	Leela	
1983	Himavahini	Sainaba	
1983	Kuyilinethedi	Chithra Thampatti	
1983	Bandham	Sharmila	
1983	Iniyenkilum	Rekha	
1983	Naseema	Naseema	
1983	Eettappuli	Hema	
1983	Ee Yugam	Madhavi	
1984	Athirathram	Naseema	
1984	Manasse Ninakku Mangalam	Geetha	
1984	Amme Naaraayana	Naanikutty (Yakshi)	
1984	Kadamattathachan	Bivathu	
1984	Nishedi	Ajitha	
1984	Krishna Guruvaayoorappa	Sharada	
1984	Kilikkonchal		
1984	Ithaa Innu Muthal	Nimmy	
1984	Akkare	Valsala	
1985	Akkacheede Kunjuvava		
1985	Uyarthezhunelpu		
1985	Idanilangal	Subhadra	
1986	Annoru Raavil		
1986	Karinaagam		
1987	Vamban	Dominic's daughter	
1988	Bheekaran	Suma	

=== Tamil ===
Year	Title	Role	Notes
1980	Matravai Neril		
1981	Pattam Padhavi		
1981	Andhi Mayakkam	Stella	
1982	Krodham	Kavitha	
1982	Kaduvulluku Oru Kadidham		
1982	Anu		
1982	Kanavugal Karpanaigal		
1982	Pakkathu Veetu Roja		
1983	Villiyanur Matha		
1984	Niraparaadhi	Aruna	
1984	Rajathanthiram	Maya	

=== Kannada ===
Year	Title	Role	Notes
1980	Anurakthe		
1987	Romanchana		

=== Hindi ===
- Prem Sandesh (1988).. (Released posthumously)
