= Kilikkonjal =

Malayalam movie

- Theatrical release poster
- Directed by: V. Ashok Kumar
- Screenplay by: George Onakkoor
- Story by: Kuruvila Kayyalakkal
- Produced by: Edappazhinji Velappan
- Starring: Mohanlal; Pyarelal; Adoor Bhasi; Ranipadmini
- Cinematography: V. E. Gopinath
- Edited by: M. V. Natarajan
- Music by: Darsan Raman
- Production company: Continental Corporation
- Distributed by: Murali Films; Hari Movies
- Release date: 24 May 1984
- Country: India
- Language: Malayalam

Kilikkonjal (transl. Bird's chirp) is a 1984 Indian Malayalam-language drama film directed by V. Ashok Kumar and written by George Onakkoor from a story by Kuruvila Kayyalakkal; it was produced by Edappazhinji Velappan. It stars Mohanlal, Pyarelal, Ranipadmini, and Adoor Bhasi. The film has a musical score by Darsan Raman.

== Cast ==
- Mohanlal
- Pyarelal
- Adoor Bhasi
- Ranipadmini
- Mucherla Aruna
- Jayamalini
- K. P. A. C. Sunny
- Unni Mary
- Poojappura Ravi

== Production ==
Mohanlal's elder brother Pyarelal debuted as an actor in the film, appearing in an important character.

== Soundtrack ==
The music was composed by Darsan Raman and the lyrics were written by Bichu Thirumala.

| No. | Song | Singers | Lyrics | Length (m:ss) |
|---|---|---|---|---|
| 1 | "Kulir Paarijatham Poothu" | K. J. Yesudas | Bichu Thirumala | |
| 2 | "Peyyaathe Poya Meghame" | K. J. Yesudas | Bichu Thirumala | |
| 3 | "Peyyaathe Poya Meghame" | S. Janaki | Bichu Thirumala | |
| 4 | "Raathrikku Neelam Pora" | S. Janaki, Chandran | Bichu Thirumala | |
| 5 | "Ragam Thanam Swaram" | K. J. Yesudas, K. S. Chithra, Chandran | Bichu Thirumala | |
