= Aakkramanam =

- Directed by: Sreekumaran Thampi
- Written by: Sreekumaran Thampi
- Produced by: Sreekumaran Thampi; Bhavani Rajeswari Production
- Starring: Madhu; Jayan; Balan K. Nair; Sathaar; Sreevidya; Jayabharathi
- Edited by: K. Narayanan
- Music by: Shyam
- Release date: 21 February 1981
- Country: India
- Language: Malayalam

Aakkramanam (transl. Attack) is a 1981 Indian Malayalam-language film written and directed by Sreekumaran Thampi. The film stars Madhu, Jayan, Balan K. Nair, Sathaar, Sreevidya and Jayabharathi.

== Cast ==
- Madhu as Varghees
- Jayan as Aravindhan
- Balan K. Nair as Kaasim
- Sathaar as Police Officer
- Sreevidya as Gracy
- Jayabharathi as Shanthi
- Aranmula Ponnamma as Devaki Amma (Aravindhan's Mother)
- Jagathy Sreekumar as Close up Thankappan
- G. K. Pillai as Krishnadas
- K. P. A. C. Azeez as Rasheed
- Jalaja as Saleena
- Poojappura Ravi as Chandi (Lorry Cleaner)
- Prameela as Aysha
- Jayamalini

== Soundtrack ==
Song	Playback	Lyrics	Duration
"Eid Mubarak"	K. J. Yesudas	Sreekumaran Thampi	5:04
"Muthukudayenthi"	K. J. Yesudas, S. Janaki	Sreekumaran Thampi	3:11
"Odum Thira Onnam Thira"	P. Jayachandran, Jolly Abraham, Sherin Peters	Sreekumaran Thampi	3:45
"Lilly Lilly My Darling"	S. P. Balasubrahmanyam, S. P. Sailaja, Chorus	Sreekumaran Thampi	4:21
"Peethambaradhaariyitha"	S. Janaki	Sreekumaran Thampi	3:42
