= Aakrosham =

- Theatrical release poster
- Directed by: A. B. Raj
- Written by: A. B. Raj; Velliman Vijayan (dialogues)
- Produced by: A. B. Raj
- Starring: Prem Nazir; Srividya; Mohanlal; Rajalakshmi
- Cinematography: Babulnath Walke
- Edited by: B. S. Mani
- Music by: Ben Surendar
- Production company: Kalarenjini Films
- Distributed by: Central Pictures
- Release date: 2 October 1982
- Country: India
- Language: Malayalam

Aakrosham (transl. Shout) is a 1982 Indian Malayalam-language action film written, directed and produced by A. B. Raj. The film stars Prem Nazir, Srividya, Mohanlal and Rajalakshmi in the lead roles. The film has musical score by Ben Surendar.

== Cast ==
- Prem Nazir as Commissioner Rajashekharan Thambi
- Srividya as Prabha Rajashekharan Thambi
- Mohanlal as Mohanachandran
- Rajalakshmi as Nirmala
- Balan K. Nair as Kollakkaaran Ganga (Gangadharan)
- Rajkumar as Premachandran
- Ranipadmini as Rekha
- Sathyakala as Geetha
- T. G. Ravi as Bhadran
- Master Manoj as Biju

== Soundtrack ==
The music was composed by Ben Surendar and the lyrics were written by Sreekumaran Thampi.

No.	Song	Singers	Lyrics	Length
1	"Ee Mukham"	P. Jayachandran, Vani Jairam	Sreekumaran Thampi	
2	"Innale Innu Naale"	P. Susheela, Chorus	Sreekumaran Thampi	
3	"Kaaduvittu Naattilvanna"	K. J. Yesudas, Chorus	Sreekumaran Thampi	
4	"Vazhiyambalathil"	K. J. Yesudas	Sreekumaran Thampi	
