= Sacred Heart Matriculation School =

Sacred Heart Matriculation Higher Secondary School

Location
- Kayyunni, Gudalur, The Nilgiris, Tamil Nadu; 643205; India

Information
- Type: Co-educational; Higher secondary school
- Established: 1985
- School district: Nilgiris
- Authority: Fathima Matha Trust, Nilgiri Educational Trust
- Principal: Fr. Jaison Thomas (as of 2019)
- Grades: LKG - Class XII
- Language: English, (medium); Tamil, Malayalam, Hindi
- Affiliation: Samacheer Kalvi
- Correspondent: Fr. Rajeesh Mathew (as of 2019)
- Manager: Fr. Thomas Manakunnell (as of 2019)
- Students called: Sacred Heartians (common); The Fellow Army (12th Batch 2019-20)
- Website: sacredheartkayyunni.com

Sacred Heart Matriculation Higher Secondary School (SHMHSS) is a matriculation institution in the town of Kayyunni, Gudalur, Nilgiris - Tamil Nadu. The school is a Christian missionary educational institution ran by Fathima Matha Trust along with Nilgiri Educational Trust.

== History ==
The school was founded in 1985, by Fathima Matha Trust for the purpose of providing education for the rural areas of Gudalur. Since its inception the school has grown rapidly providing Kindergarten to Class XII from the Matriculation Board as well as State Education Board of Tamil Nadu.

== Location ==
The school is located at the town of Kayyunni in the Western Ghats region of Nilgiris, Tamil Nadu providing a scenic and natural learning atmosphere. Being in the western parts of Nilgiris, the school shares its visibility to nearby states of Kerala and Karnataka.

== Education ==
Since the school is run by a christian missionary, the majority of staffs are from priests and nuns from the Fathima Matha church. Even though the institution is run by christian missionary the school encourages no partiality in the admission for children from other castes and creeds.

The medium of instruction is English and has optional secondary languages to choose from Tamil, Malayalam or Hindi.

== List Of Principals ==
As of 2019

Principals	Qualifications	Time Period	Notes
Sister Mareena	SH	1985-1992	First Principal
Sister Agnes Mathew	SH	1992-1999	
Sister Innocent	SH	1999-2000	
Father Biju Mathew	M.A; B.Ed.	2000-2003	
Father Johny Kallupura	M.A; B.Ed.	2003-2017	Longest Serving Principal
Father Biju Mathew	M.A; B.Ed.	2017-2019	First Principal To Hold The Office Twice
Father Jaison Thomas	M.Sc; B.Ed.	2019–present	

== Sports Facilities ==
Courts Available

- Football
- Throwball
- Basketball
- Badminton
- Tennikoit
- Table Tennis

Other Available Games

- Cricket
- Handball
- Chess
- Kabbadi
- Volleyball

The is known to have outstanding sporting achievement in the Nilgiri District Sports Meets conducted by the Government of Tamilnadu. The School holds the record for most overall championships in the Gudalur Zonal Athletics Meet.

== Learning Facilities ==
The higher secondary section have 5 different streams:

- Mathematics with Computer Science
- Mathematics with Biology
- Pure Science
- Commerce with Computer Applications
- Biology with Computer Science

Till 10th, All the students have to study Tamil as their first language. The higher secondary students can choose Tamil, Malayalam or Hindi as their first language. Besides these the students are also taught General Knowledge (GK) and Moral Science as subjects. All Students are allowed to speak English throughout the school campus. And Special training for students are also given for languages.

Available Facilities

- Digital Smart Class
- Computer Laboratory
- Physics Laboratory
- Chemistry Laboratory
- Biology Laboratory
- Library

=== Co-curricular Activities ===
Students are also taught additional co curricular activities along with subjects

Available Co-curricular Classes

- Gym
- Karate
- Yoga
- Music
- Dance
- Arts and crafts

== Awards ==
By providing better learning environment, the school had earned high rankings at the district and state levels.
