= Guerrilla (1985 film) =

- Directed by: K. S. Gopalakrishnan
- Music by: K. J. Joy
- Release date: 20 December 1985
- Country: India
- Language: Malayalam

Guerrilla is a 1985 Indian Malayalam film, directed by K. S. Gopalakrishnan. The film had musical score by K. J. Joy.

== Cast ==
- Prameela
- Bheeman Raghu
- K. P. A. C. Azeez
- Kaviyoor Ponnamma
- Kundara Johny
- Poojappura Ravi

== Soundtrack ==
The music was composed by K. J. Joy and the lyrics were written by Bharanikkavu Sivakumar.

No.	Song	Singers	Lyrics	Length (m:ss)
1	"Malaraayennum"	Krishnachandran	Bharanikkavu Sivakumar	
