= Pokkattadikkaari =

- Directed by: P. G. Vishwambharan
- Starring: Vincent; Sudheer; Ravikumar
- Music by: A. T. Ummer
- Release date: 25 April 1978
- Country: India
- Language: Malayalam

Pokkattadikkaari is a 1978 Indian Malayalam-language film, directed by P. G. Vishwambharan. The film stars Vincent, Sudheer and Ravikumar. The film's score was composed by A. T. Ummer.

== Cast ==
- Unnimary
- Ravikumar
- Sudheer
- Vijayalalitha
- Vincent

== Soundtrack ==
The music was composed by A. T. Ummer with lyrics by Yusufali Kechery and Mankombu Gopalakrishnan.

| No. | Song | Singers | Lyrics | Length (m:ss) |
|---|---|---|---|---|
| 1 | "Aadyathe Nottathil" | K. J. Yesudas | Yusufali Kechery | |
| 2 | "Aashanaashichathu" | Jolly Abraham, Rajagopal | Mankombu Gopalakrishnan | |
| 3 | "Madhuravikaara Tharanginiyil" | K. J. Yesudas, Ambili | Yusufali Kechery | |
| 4 | "Pranaya Jodikale" | P. Jayachandran, Ambili | Yusufali Kechery | |
