= Kothuku Nanappan =

Malayalam film actor

- Born: S. Narayanan Namboothiri; 12 March 1935; Changanassery, Travancore Presidency, British India (present-day Kottayam)
- Died: 26 December 1994 (aged 59); Thiruvananthapuram, Kerala, India
- Occupation: Film actor
- Years active: 1978–1994
- Spouse: Suseela Devi
- Children: 2
- Parent(s): G. Shankaran Namboothiri, Saraswathy Antharjanam

Kothuku Nanappan (12 March 1935 – 26 December 1994) was an Indian theater actor, mimicry artist and film actor in Malayalam movies during the 1980s and 1990s. His popular movies are Naadodikkaattu (1987), Aanaval Mothiram (1991), Sarapanjaram (1979), Paavam Poornima (1984) and Chenkol (1993). His is known for his performance as a supervisor in the comedy film Nadodikattu (1987).

== Personal life ==
He was born to Saraswathy Antharjanam and G. Shankaran Namboothiri, of Muttathu Madom, Perunna, Changanassery, Travancore, on 12 March 1935. His official name was S. Narayanan Namboothiri. He had a diploma in Textile Technology from Govt. Polytechnic, Thiruvananthapuram. He worked as a Textile Investigator Textile Commissioner's Office, Mumbai. Later he came back to Kerala to act in movies. He is married to Suseela Devi from Kizhakkedathu House, Varanad, Cherthala in 1962. The couple had two sons. He died on 26 December 1994 on Thiruvananthapuram, Kerala.

== Partial filmography ==
Year	Title	Role	Notes
1978	Lisa	Sankunni	
1980	Lava		
1981	Ahimsa	Sankaran	
1982	Padayottam		
1982	John Jaffer Janardhanan		
1983	Aa Raathri	Rahim master	
1984	Parannu Parannu Parannu	Menon	
1984	Paavam Poornima		
1985	Aarodum Parayaruthu		
1985	Kaiyum Thlayum Purathidaruthe	President	
1986	Dheem Tharikida Thom		
1986	Nandi Veendum Varika		
1986	T. P. Balagopalan M. A.	Kannappan	
1986	Mazha Peyyunnu Maddalam Kottunnu		
1986	Ithile Iniyum Varu	Joseph	
1987	Nadodikattu	Office Staff	
1988	Oru CBI Diary Kurippu	Murder Witness	
1989	Asthikal Pookkunnu		
1990	Kadathanadan Ambadi	Beeran	
1991	Aanaval Mothiram	Coffin shop owner	
1991	Nettipattom	Peethambaran's uncle	
1993	Chenkol		
