= Kunchan (actor) =

Indian actor

- Born: Mohan Das; 14 November 1952 (age 73); Fort Kochi, State of Travancore-Cochin (present day Ernakulam, Kerala), India
- Occupation: Actor
- Years active: 1969 – present
- Spouse: Shoba (m. 1985)
- Children: 2
- Parents: Krishnan; Oolamma

Mohan Das (born 14 November 1952), better known by his stage name Kunchan is an Indian actor, primarily concentrating on Malayalam films. He has done over 650 films in Malayalam. He usually does minor roles. He has also done important character roles. He started his career when Malayalam films were made in black and white. He made his debut with Tamil film Manaivi (1969), which went unreleased, and his first release was Rest House released in 1970. His most remembered roles were in films like Ivar (1980), Nayakan (1985), Avanazhi (1986), Carnivel (1989) Aye Auto (1990), Kottayam Kunjachan (1990), and Lelam (1997). He has also acted in the Tamil film Manmadhan Ambu (2010).

== Personal life ==
Kunchan was born as Mohan Das as the second among five children to Krishnan and Oolamma at Fort Kochi on 14 November 1952. He had three brothers and a sister. He had his primary education from T. D. High School, Mattancherry, Kochi.

Kunchan married Shoba on 28 April 1985. She owns a beauty parlor, "Live In Style", at Kochi. The couple has two daughters, Swetha and Swathi.

== Filmography ==
=== 1960s ===
Year	Title	Role	Notes
1969	Rest House		

=== 1970s ===
Year	Title	Role	Notes
1970	Rakthapushpam	Jambu	
1971	Lankadahanam	Mohan	
1971	Rathrivandi		
1972	Sambhavami Yuge Yuge	Dressmart Proprietor	
1972	Taxi Car		
1973	Masappady Mathupillai		
1973	Chenda		
1973	Thekkan Kattu	Chari	
1973	Ajnathavasam	Payyan	
1973	Panchavadi	Narayana Pilla	
1974	Chandrakantham	Krishnankutty	
1974	Sapthaswaragal		
1974	Pancha Thanthram	Shanto	
1974	Bhoogolam Thiriyunnu	Aanakkaaran Panikkar	
1974	Rahasyarathri	Kuttappan	
1975	Chattambikkalyaani	Chotta Sulthan	
1975	Kalyana Panthal		
1975	Bhaarya Illaatha Raathri		
1975	Prayanam		
1975	Sathyathinte Nizhalil		
1975	Pravaham	Radhakrishnan	
1975	Criminals		
1975	Chief Guest		
1975	Kottaaram Vilkkaanundu		
1975	Mucheettukalikkarante Makal	Police officer	
1975	Aaranya Kandam		
1975	Chumaduthangi	Prabhu	
1975	Cheenavala	Madhu	
1976	Amma		
1976	Aayiram Janmangal	Mohandas	
1976	Ajayanum Vijayanum	Kutttan	
1976	Kamadhenu	Shankunni Nair	
1977	Varadakshina		
1977	Aanandam Paramaanandam		
1977	Rathimanmadhan		
1977	Sankhupushpam	Govindan	
1977	Anugraham	Padmalojanan	
1977	Ormakal Marikkumo	Pappu	
1977	Aadhya Paadam		
1977	Muttathe Mulla	Supran	
1977	Randu Lokam	Kuttan	
1978	Urakkam Varaatha Raathrikal	Kuttappan	
1978	Velluvili		
1978	Padmatheertham	Rameshan	
1978	Amarsham		
1978	Tharoo Oru Janmam Koodi		
1978	Ithaa Oru Manushyan	Potti	
1978	Mattoru Karnan		
1978	Adavukal Pathinettu	Pappu	
1978	Kaathirunna Nimisham	Pottan	
1978	Asthamayam		
1978	Randilonnu		
1978	Mudramothiram	Baiju	
1978	Bandhanam		
1979	Vaaleduthaven Vaalaal		
1979	Agni Vyooham		
1979	Yakshi Paaru		
1979	Indradhanussu	Kuttappan	
1979	Aarattu		
1979	Angakkuri	Dasappan	
1979	Aavesham	Chammunni	

=== 1980s ===
Year	Title	Role	Notes
1980	Adhikaram	Ramu	
1980	Sakthi	Man at the Toddy Shop	
1980	Karimpana	Pushpangadan	
1980	Chaakara	Narayanan	
1980	Ivar	Porinchu	
1980	Angadi	Krishnankutty	
1980	Air Hostess		
1980	Chandra Bimbam		
1981	Kolilakkam		
1981	Sambhavam		
1981	Swarangal Swapnagal	Thankamani	
1981	Thushaaram	Cap. Alexander	
1981	Sankarsham	Shishupalan	
1981	Orikkal Koodi		
1981	Avatharam		
1981	Thadavara	Vaasu	
1981	Dwandha Yudham	Detective Poker	
1981	Ahimsa		
1982	Thuranna Jail	Thankappan	
1982	Aayudham	Kunchan, Phalgunan	
1982	Shila	Babu	
1982	Amrita Geetham	Mani	
1982	Kurukkante Kalyanam	Dilip Kumar	
1982	Kakka		
1982	Aa Divasam	Pappan	
1983	Mandanmmar Londanil	Prabhakaran	
1983	Aattakalasam		
1983	Father Damien		
1983	Rathilayam	Thankappan	
1983	Parasparam	Sudheer Kumar	
1983	Rugma		
1983	Angam	Chinnan	
1983	Ente Katha	Charley	
1983	Bhookambam	Kora	
1983	Swapname Ninakku Nandi	Mallan	
1983	Ponnethooval		
1983	Engane Nee Marakkum		
1984	Sreekrishna Parunthu		
1984	Swantham Sarika	Rajappan	
1984	Manithali	Kili	
1984	Umaanilayam	Rocky	
1984	Enganeyundashaane		
1984	Ivide Ingane	Appukuttan	
1984	Thathamme Poocha Poocha	Kochappan	
1984	Paavam Poornima	Porinju	
1984	Onnum Mindatha Bharya	Hyder	
1985	Njan Piranna Nattil	Mental patient	
1985	Nayakan	Vyas/Vasu	
1985	Puli Varunne Puli	Kumar	
1985	Muhurtham 11.30 nu	Lonappan	
1985	Ambada Njaane!	Arjunan	
1985	Chillu Kottaram		
1985	Oru Sandesam Koodi	Kadara Kunjunni	
1985	Anubandham	Krishnankutty	
1985	Makan Ente Makan		
1985	Anakkorumma	Govindan	
1985	Thammil Thammil	Const. Chettiyar	
1985	Vannu Kandu Keezhadakki	Cassette shop boy	
1985	Choodatha Pookal	Hari	
1985	Upaharam	Khader	
1985	Idanilangal	Gopalankutty	
1985	Yathra	Devasiya	
1986	Sayam Sandhya		
1986	Aayiram Kannukal	Jayan	
1986	Aavanazhi	Constable "Samshayam" Vasu	
1986	Ithile Iniyum Varu	Lawrence	
1986	Rajavinte Makan	Krishnankutty	
1986	Nyayavidhi	Sadaraman	
1987	Naalkavala	Mani	
1988	Vellanakalude Nadu	Advocate	
1989	Chakkikotha Chankaran	Police Officer	
1989	Antharjanam	Kuttappan	
1989	Carnivel	Lobo	
1989	Nair Saab	Cadet Mohan	
1989	Ramji Rao Speaking	Mathai	

=== 1990s ===
Year	Title	Role	Notes
1990	Kottayam Kunjachan	Kuttiappan	
1990	His Highness Abdulla	Balaraman	
1990	Kadathanadan Ambadi	Chanthu Gurukkal's sidekick	
1990	Indrajaalam	Appu	
1990	Aye Auto	Ramann	
1990	Dr. Pasupathy		
1991	Meena Bazaar	Video Parlor Owner	
1991	Kadalora Kattu	Adru	
1991	Ganamela	Shakkeer bhai	
1991	Thudar Katha	English teacher	
1991	Ulladakkam	Freddy	
1991	Inspector Balram	SI Radhakrishnan aka "Shamshyam" Vasu	
1991	Anaswaram		
1992	Ennodu Ishtam Koodamo	Krishnankutty	
1992	Kallan Kappalil Thanne	Hotel Helper	
1992	Kamaladalam	Sankaran	
1992	Kingini	Chandi Thomas	
1992	Thiruthalvaadi	Vasu	
1992	Aparatha	Abdullah	
1992	Vietnam Colony	Pattabhiraman	
1993	Vatsalyam	Divakaran	
1993	Gandharvam	Mammunju	
1994	Chief Minister K. R. Gowthami	A. Kumaran Nambiyar	
1994	Varanamaalyam	Unnithan	
1994	Manathe Kottaram	Security Guard	
1995	Puthukottaile Puthumanavalan		
1995	Highway	Vasco	
1995	The King	Kuruppu	
1997	Lelam	Kaimal	
1997	Safalam	Warrier	
1998	Punjabi House	Thommichen	
1998	The Truth	Sankaran	

=== 2000s ===
Year	Title	Role	Notes
2000	Sathyameva Jayathe	Police Constable	
2001	Ee Parakkum Thalika	Avaran Arakal	
2002	Njan Rajavu		
2003	Mizhi Randilum	Vasu	
2004	Sethurama Iyer CBI	Krishna Iyer	
2005	Thaskara Veeran	Raghavan Mashu	
2005	Anandabhadram		
2006	Pathaaka	Bapputty	
2006	Pothan Vava	Panicker	
2006	Thuruppugulan		
2006	Prajapathi	Nambiar	
2007	Chotta Mumbai	Philippose	
2008	Annan Thampi		
2008	Twenty:20		
2009	Swantham Lekhakan	News Reporter	

=== 2010s ===
Year	Title	Role	Notes
2010	Nizhal		
2010	Drona 2010	Ashokan, Maniyankottu member	
2010	Manmadhan Ambu	Kunju Kurup	Tamil film; credited as Mohan Das
2011	Three Kings	Himself	Special appearance
2011	Christian Brothers	Driver	
2011	Innanu Aa Kalyanam	Krishnankutty's father	
2012	Da Thadiya	Joshua Thadikkaran	
2012	Second Show	Janardhanan	
2012	The King & the Commissioner	Kuruppu	
2012	Ustad Hotel	Driver Abdullah	
2012	Simhasanam	Pisharodi	
2013	Mumbai Police	ASI Sudhakaran Nair	
2013	Ithu Pathiramanal	Chellapanashari	
2013	Drishyam	Head Constable Madhavan	
2014	Salalah Mobiles	Munna	
2014	How Old Are You	Narayanan	
2014	Gangster	Mani Menon	
2015	Acha Dhin	Gopi	
2016	Kali	House Owner	
2016	Oppam	Ganga's father	
2017	Alamara	Vasu	
2017	Puthan Panam	Bharathan	
2017	Vimaanam	Priest	
2018	Panchavarnathatha	Grandfather	
2018	Ennaalum Sarath..?	Sarath's father	
2019	An International Local Story	Rahul's father	
2019	Evidey	Kabir Kallai	
2019	Finals	Azees	
2019	Ganagandharvan	Balan	

=== 2020s ===
Year	Title	Role	Notes
2020	Maniyarayile Ashokan	Narayanan	
2021	Kurup	Vijayan	
2022	Naradan	Gurudasan	
2023	Maheshum Marutiyum	Adv. Rajan Pillai	
2024	DNA	Antony	
2024	Oru Anweshanathinte Thudakkam		

== Television ==
- Mangalyam(Asianet)
- Kadamattathu Kathanar (Asianet)
- Thumbapoo(Mazhavil Manorama)
