= V. D. Rajappan =

Indian actor

V. D. Rajappan (വി. ഡി. രാജപ്പൻ)
- Born: Velikuzhiyil Devadasan Rajappan; 3 January 1944; Kottayam, Kerala, India
- Died: 25 March 2016 (aged 72); Kottayam, Kerala, India
- Occupation: Film actor, Script writer, Recitation artist, Comedian, Parody writer
- Years active: 1982–2005
- Spouse: Sulochana
- Children: Rajesh, Rajeev

Velikuzhiyil Devadasan Rajappan (വി. ഡി. രാജപ്പൻ) was an Indian actor in Malayalam movies . He was a popular Kadhaprasangam artist in Kerala. He was born in Kottayam, Kerala. He was known for his inventive style in stand-up comedy in the late 1970s, 1980s and 1990s. He started his career in the 1980s mainly portraying comedian roles and has acted in more than 100 films in Malayalam. He is considered as the godfather of parody songs in Malayalam.

== Family ==
He was born to Devadasan and Vasanthy at Kottayam. He was married to Sulochana and they have two sons, Rajesh and Rajeev. Rajesh works in M. G. University and Rajeev is a nurse in Doha. He was settled at Peroor, Ettumanoor. He died at a private hospital in Kottayam at the age of 72 on 24 March 2016.

== Filmography ==
- OK Chacko Cochin Mumbai (2005) as Jabbar
- Thalamelam (2004) as Psychiatrist
- Singaari Bolona (2003)
- Aala (2002)
- Layam (2001)
- Nagaravadhu (2001) as Ittichan
- Aparanmaar Nagarathil (2001)
- Alibabayum Arara Kallanmarum (1998) as Gopalan
- Man of the Match (1996)
- Puthukkottayile Puthumanavalan (1995) as Gurukkal
- Kusruthikaatu (1995) as Kariyachan
- Mangalam Veettil Manaseswari Gupta (1995) as Musthafa
- Meleparambil Aanveedu (1993)
- Souhrudam (1991) as Narayanan
- Nyayavidhi (1986) as David
- Kunjattakilikal (1986) as Dasappan
- Oru Nokku Kanan (1985) as Kunjandi
- Makan Ente Makan (1985) as Dasappan
- Pachavelicham (1985) as Thankavelu
- Akkacheede Kunjuvava (1985)
- Aanakkorumma (1985) as Balan
- Muhurtham Pathnonnu Muppathinu (1985)... Narayanan
- Mutharamkunnu P.O. (1985) as M. K. Sahadevan
- Itha Innu Muthal (1984) as 'Thacholi' Thankappan
- Ivide Ingane (1984) as Maniyan
- Muthodumuthu (1984) as Kuriachan
- Swarna Gopuram (1984) as Mathappan
- Sandhyaykkenthinu Sindooram (1984)
- Panchavadi Palam (1984)
- Veendum Chalikkunna Chakram (1984)
- Poochakkoru Mookkuthi (1984) as Keshu Pillai
- Aattakalasam (1983) as Dr. V. D. Rajappan
- Thimingalam (1983) as Union Secretary
- Sandhyakku Virinja Poovu (1983)
- Varanmaare Aavashyamundu (1983)
- Engine Nee Marakkum (1983)
- Kuyiline Thedi (1983) as Vetti Pattar
- Kakka (1982)

== Kadhaprasangam Discography ==
1. Akkidi Pakkaran
2. Amittu
3. Athathinethiya Maveli
4. Avalude Partsukal
5. Chikayunna Sundari
6. Ennennum Kurangettande
7. Kidney
8. Kumari Eruma
9. Laharai Mukku
10. Mak Mak
11. Namukku Parkkan Chandanakadukal
12. Priye Ninte Kura
13. Pothuputhri
14. Karutha Manavatty
15. Kottayam to Kodambakkam
16. Maveli Kanda Keralam

== Death ==
V. D. Rajappan died on March 25, 2016, at 11:30 am in KIMS Hospital, Kottayam. He was suffering from diabetes and high blood pressure, which led to the paralysis of his leg. But cardiac arrest was the cause of death. He was cremated with full state honors on the next day at his house premises.
