= Shyam (composer) =

Indian composer

- Also known as: Shyam
- Born: Samuel Joseph; March 18, 1937 (age 89)
- Origin: Guindy, Tamil Nadu, India
- Genre: Film score
- Occupation: Music director
- Instruments: Harmonium, violin
- Years active: 1963–present

Samuel Joseph (born 1937), better known as Shyam, is a music composer who works in Malayalam cinema.

From the mid-1970s to the late 1980s, Shyam had a prolific run as a composer in the Malayalam film industry, composing for nearly 200 films. Working with all major directors of the time, Shyam had scored for many hits of Jayan and the early films of Mammootty and Mohanlal.

== Career beginnings ==
Shyam apprenticed under maestros M. S. Viswanathan and Salil Chowdhury, the former renaming him 'Shyam'. He has been an assistant for various music directors including Salil Chowdhury, Rajan Nagendra, Satyam, S. Rajeswara Rao, Pendyala Nageswara Rao, AM Raja, TG Lingappa, etc. for several years before venturing as an independent music director. He has also worked as a lead violinist with famous composers like C. Ramachandra, V Dakshinamoorthi, Naushad, Madan Mohan, G. Devarajan, Bombay Ravi, R. D. Burman, etc.

Along with his training in western violin he is also trained in Carnatic classical violin under the tutelage of legendary classical violinist Lalgudi Jayaraman.

He debuted as an independent film composer in Malayalam cinema through the 1974 film, Manyasree Viswamithran directed by actor Madhu. All the tracks from the movie including Kettille Kottayathoru became huge success.

== Partial filmography ==
Malayalam

- Manyasree Viswamithran (1974)
- Saritha (1977)
- Abhinivesham (1977)
- Kalliyankattu Neeli (1979)
- Angaadi(1980)
- Thrishna(1981)
- Enthino Pookunna Pookkal (1982)
- Mazhu (1982)
- Engane Nee Marakkum (1983)
- America America (1983 film) (1983)
- Aksharangal (1984)
- Kanamarayathu (1984)
- Nirakkoottu (1985)
- Gandhinagar 2nd Street (1986)
- Aavanazhi (1986)
- Malarum Kiliyum (1986)
- New Delhi (1987)
- Nadodikattu (1987)
- Oru CBI Diary Kurippu (1988)
- Daisy (1988)
- Moonnam Mura (1988)
- Jagratha (1989)
- Adhipan (1989)
- Adikkurippu (1989)
- Naduvazhikal (1989)
- Kottayam Kunjachan (1990)
- Randam Varavu (1990)
- Arhatha (1990)
- Inspector Balram (1991)
- Anubhoothi (1997)
- Sethurama Iyer CBI (2004)
- Nerariyan CBI (2005)

Tamil

Year	Film	Language	Director	Banner	Notes
1972	Karunthel Kannayiram	Tamil	R. Sundaram	Modern Theatres	Shyam–Philips
1974	Appa Amma	Tamil	Maa. Raa.	K. S. Sithambaram Simham Production	
1976	Unarchigal	Tamil	R. C. Sakthi	B. S. Productions	
1977	Oonjal	Tamil			
1978	Alli Darbar	Tamil	K. M. Balakrishnan	S.P.V. Films	
1978	Manitharil Ithanai Nirangalah!	Tamil	R. C. Sakthi	VDS Productions	
1979	Devathai	Tamil	P. N. Menon	P. P. Creations	
1979	Naan Nandri Solven	Tamil	Panasai Maniyan	N. P. M. Films	
1979	Nee Sirithal Naan Sirippen	Tamil	V. Rajagopal	Sound & Sight	
1979	Pancha Kalyani	Tamil	N. Sambandam	U. M. Productions	
1979	Thevaigal	Tamil	N. S. Ravishankar	Amirtha Jothi Combines	
1980	Devi	Tamil	Balaji	U. M. Productions	
1980	Mattravai Neril	Tamil	T. S. B. K. Moulee	Ponmalar Arts	
1980	Velaikkari Vijaya	Tamil			
1981	Andhi Mayakkam	Tamil	Banudasan	Yuva Raja Pictures	
1981	Idhayam Pesugirathu	Tamil	S. A. Chandrasekhar	Sangamam United Movies	
1981	Kanneeril Ezhudhadhe	Tamil	Gangai Kondan	Iqbal Creation	
1981	Salanam	Tamil			
1981	Vaa Indha Pakkam	Tamil	T. S. B. K. Moulee	Ponmalar International	
1982	Iniyavale Vaa	Tamil	N. C. Chakravarthy	Aiswarya Art	
1982	Kuppathu Ponnu	Tamil	Feroz Sharif	Zoroo Creations	
1982	Nandri Meendum Varuga	Tamil	T. S. B. K. Moulee	Ponmalar International	
1982	Punitha Malar	Tamil	Durai		
1983	Kalvadiyum Pookal	Tamil	V. Karthigeyan	Ravi Ben Cine Arts	
1983	Oru Pullanguzhal Aduppuppthugirathu	Tamil	T. S. B. K. Moulee	Ponmalar International	
1984	Kuyile Kuyile	Tamil	Srini	P. K. D. Pictures	
1984	Kuzhandhai Yesu	Tamil	V. Rajan	I. J. C. Productions	
1984	Nalam Nalamariya Aaval	Tamil	P. Jayadevi	Thulasi International	
1985	Santosha Kanavugal	Tamil	R. C. Sakthi	AKM Pictures	
1985	Vilangu Meen	Tamil	P. Jayadevi	Thulasi International	
1987	Andha Vaanam Saktchi	Tamil	Cochin Haneefa		
1987	Jaathi Pookkal	Tamil	A. P. Rathinam	Lavanya Films	
1987	Paasam Oru Vesham	Tamil	P. Jayadevi	Liberty Films	
1987	Poo Mazhai Pozhiyuthu	Tamil	V. Azhagappan	Sree Rajakali Amman Movies	back ground score only
1987	Vilangu	Tamil	P. Jayadevi	Thulasi International	
1989	Sariyana Jodi	Tamil	Velu Prabhakaran	Film Makers International	

- Ithu Kathai Alla
- Kunguma Kolangal
- Akkaraiku Vaaringala
- Kaladi Osai

Other languages

Year	Film	Language	Director	Banner	Notes
1988	Antima Teerpu	Telugu	Joshiy	Kalyani Films	
1988	New Delhi	Hindi	Joshiy	Samyuktha Productions	
1988	New Delhi	Kannada	Joshiy	Samyuktha Productions	
1996	God Father	Kannada	G. K. Mudduraj		

== Hit Songs ==
Song	Movie	Year	Singer	Lyrics
Vaishaakha Sandhye ...	Naadodikkaattu	1987	KJ Yesudas	Yusufali Kecheri
Devathaaru Poothu ...	Engane Nee Marakkum	1983	KJ Yesudas, P Susheela	Chunakkara Ramankutty
Oru Madhurakkinaavin ...	Kaanaamarayathu	1984	KJ Yesudas	Bichu Thirumala
Poomaaname ...	Nirakkoottu	1985	KS Chithra	Poovachal Khader
Thozhuthu Madangum ...	Aksharangal	1984	Unni Menon	ONV Kurup
Olangal thalam thallumbol ...	Kadathu	1981	Unni Menon	Bichu Thirumala
Mainaakam Kadalil Ninnuyarunnuvo ...	Thrishna	1981	S Janaki	Bichu Thirumala
Kaattukurinjipoovu	Radha Enna Penkutti	1979	P Jayachandran	Devadas
Manje Vaa Madhuvidhu Vela ...	Thushaaram	1981	KJ Yesudas, SP Balasubrahmanyam, Kousalya (Old)	Yusufali Kecheri
Paavaada Venam Melaada Venam ...	Angaadi	1980	KJ Yesudas	Bichu Thirumala
Shyaamameghame Nee ...	Adhipan	1989	KS Chithra	Chunakkara Ramankutty
Shruthiyil Ninnuyarum	Thrishna	1981	KJ Yesudas	Bichu Thirumala
Kannaanthaliyum	Anubandham	1985	KJ Yesudas	Bichu Thirumala
Kannum Kannum Thammil Thammil ...	Angaadi	1980	KJ Yesudas, S Janaki	Bichu Thirumala
Hridayam kondezhuthunna ...	Aksharathettu	1989	KJ Yesudas	Sreekumaran Thampi
Ormmathan Vaasantha ...	Daisy	1988	KJ Yesudas	P Bhaskaran
Chinnukkutty Urangeele ...	Oru Nokku Kaanan	1985	KS Chithra, Unni Menon	Chunakkara Ramankutty
Raavil poonthen	Naaduvaazhikal	1989	Unni Menon, Dinesh	Shibu Chakravarthy
Mazhai Tharumo Endhan.. (Tamil)	Manitharil Ithanai Nirangalah!	1978	S. P. Balasubrahmanyam, S. P. Sailaja	Kannadasan

== Awards ==
Kerala State Film Awards:

- Best Music Director – 1983 – Aaroodam
- Best Music Director – 1984 – Kanamarayathu
