= Thaalappoli =

- Directed by: M. Krishnan Nair
- Written by: Kalanilayam; Cheri Viswanath (dialogues)
- Starring: Prameela; Sankaradi; Meena; Sudheer
- Music by: V. Dakshinamoorthy
- Production company: Kalanilayam Films
- Distributed by: Kalanilayam Films
- Release date: 15 December 1977
- Country: India
- Language: Malayalam

Thaalappoli is a 1977 Indian Malayalam film, directed by M. Krishnan Nair. The film stars Prameela, Sankaradi, Meena and Sudheer in the lead roles. The film has musical score by V. Dakshinamoorthy.

== Cast ==
- Prameela
- Sankaradi
- Meena
- Sudheer
- Vincent

== Soundtrack ==
The music was composed by V. Dakshinamoorthy and the lyrics were written by Cheri Viswanath and Mankombu Gopalakrishnan.

No.	Song	Singers	Lyrics	Length (m:ss)
1	"Ini Njan Karayukayilla"	P. Susheela	Cheri Viswanath	
2	"Priyasakhi Poyvaroo"	K. J. Yesudas	Cheri Viswanath	
3	"Purushantharangale"	P. Susheela	Mankombu Gopalakrishnan	
4	"Sreevaazhum Kovilil"	Vani Jairam, Chorus	Cheri Viswanath	
5	"Vrischikakkaatte"	K. J. Yesudas	Cheri Viswanath	
