= Bhaaryaye Aavashyamundu =

1975 film

- Directed by: M. Krishnan Nair
- Written by: Cheri Viswanath
- Screenplay by: Cheri Viswanath
- Starring: M. G. Soman, Vincent, Sathaar, Prameela, Magic Raadhika
- Music by: M. S. Baburaj
- Production company: Archana Films
- Distributed by: Archana Films
- Release date: 16 January 1975
- Country: India
- Language: Malayalam

Bhaaryaye Aavashyamundu is a 1975 Indian Malayalam film, directed by M. Krishnan Nair. The film stars M. G. Soman, Vincent, Sathaar, Prameela and Magic Raadhika in the lead roles. The film has musical score by M. S. Baburaj.

== Cast ==
- M. G. Soman
- Vincent
- Sathaar
- Alummoodan
- Manavalan Joseph
- K. P. A. C. Sunny
- K. P. A. C. Azeez
- Poojappura Ravi
- Prameela
- Magic Raadhika
- Junior Sheela
- Aranmula Ponnamma
- Anandavally

== Soundtrack ==
The music was composed by M. S. Baburaj and the lyrics were written by O. N. V. Kurup.

No.	Song	Singers	Lyrics	Length (m:ss)
1	"Indraneelamanivaathil"	K. J. Yesudas	O. N. V. Kurup	
2	"Mandaaratharupetta"	K. J. Yesudas	O. N. V. Kurup	
3	"Poovum Ponnum"	K. J. Yesudas	O. N. V. Kurup	
