= Neela Sari =

Neelasaari
- Directed by: M. Krishnan Nair
- Written by: Cheri Viswanath
- Screenplay by: Cheri Viswanath
- Produced by: Kalanilayam Jeevan kumar
- Starring: Adoor Bhasi; Jose Prakash; Adoor Bhavani; Ravikumar
- Music by: V. Dakshinamoorthy
- Production company: Kalanilayam Films
- Distributed by: Kalanilayam Films
- Release date: 5 November 1976
- Country: India
- Language: Malayalam

Neelasaari is a 1976 Indian Malayalam film, directed by M. Krishnan Nair and produced by Kalanilayam Krishnan Nair. The film stars Adoor Bhasi, Jose Prakash, Adoor Bhavani and Ravikumar in the lead roles. The film has musical score by V. Dakshinamoorthy.

== Cast ==
- Adoor Bhasi
- Jose Prakash
- Adoor Bhavani
- Ravikumar
- Sumithra

== Soundtrack ==
The music was composed by V. Dakshinamoorthy and the lyrics were written by Cheri Viswanath and Pappanamkodu Lakshmanan.

| No. | Song | Singers | Lyrics | Length (m:ss) |
|---|---|---|---|---|
| 1 | "Aareda Valiyavan" | P. Jayachandran | Cheri Viswanath | |
| 2 | "En Priyamuraliyil" | K. J. Yesudas | Pappanamkodu Lakshmanan | |
| 3 | "Kaashmeera Sandhyakale" | K. J. Yesudas | Pappanamkodu Lakshmanan | |
| 4 | "Paarvana Sasikala" | Ambili, Srikanth | Pappanamkodu Lakshmanan | |
| 5 | "Priyadarsini Nin" | S. Janaki | Pappanamkodu Lakshmanan | |
| 6 | "Thapaswini Unaroo" | K. J. Yesudas | Pappanamkodu Lakshmanan | |
