= Rahasyarathri =

- Directed by: A. B. Raj
- Screenplay by: V. P. Sarathy
- Produced by: R. S. Sreenivasan
- Starring: Prem Nazir; Jayabharathi; Adoor Bhasi; Jose Prakash
- Cinematography: P. B. Mani
- Edited by: B. S. Mani
- Music by: M. K. Arjunan
- Production company: Sree Sai Productions
- Distributed by: Sree Sai Productions
- Release date: 23 March 1974
- Country: India
- Language: Malayalam

Rahasyarathri is a 1974 Indian Malayalam film, directed by A. B. Raj and produced by R. S. Sreenivasan. The film stars Prem Nazir, Jayabharathi, Adoor Bhasi and Jose Prakash in the lead roles. The film had musical score by M. K. Arjunan.

== Cast ==
- Prem Nazir as Venu
- Jayabharathi as Syamala
- Adoor Bhasi as Padmaraj
- Jose Prakash as Kurupu
- Prema as Theatre artist
- Sankaradi as Sankara Pilla
- Sreelatha Namboothiri as Savithri
- Bahadoor as Chandrappan
- Jameela Malik as Girija
- Jayakumari as Cabaret dancer
- Kaduvakulam Antony as Unnithan
- Kunchan as Kuttappan
- Pala Thankam as Devaki
- Paravoor Bharathan as RR Das
- Philomina as Gouri, Venu's mother
- Lakshmi as Girija's mother

== Soundtrack ==
The music was composed by M. K. Arjunan and the lyrics were written by Vayalar Ramavarma.

No.	Song	Singers	Lyrics	Length (m:ss)
1	"Gopakumara"	K. P. Brahmanandan, Ayiroor Sadasivan	Vayalar Ramavarma	
2	"Kanakamo Kaaminiyo"	L. R. Eeswari	Vayalar Ramavarma	
3	"Manassinte Maadhaveelathayil"	K. J. Yesudas	Vayalar Ramavarma	
4	"Thankabhasmakkuri" (Parody)	Ayiroor Sadasivan, Chandrabhanu, Manoharan, Sreelatha Namboothiri	Vayalar Ramavarma	
