= Jagadguru Aadisankaran =

- Directed by: P. Bhaskaran
- Written by: Nagavally R. S. Kurup (dialogues)
- Screenplay by: Nagavally R. S. Kurup
- Produced by: P. Bhaskaran
- Starring: Muralimohan; Kaviyoor Ponnamma; O Ramdas; Sankaradi
- Cinematography: U. Rajagopal
- Edited by: K. Sankunni
- Music by: V. Dakshinamoorthy
- Production company: Janani Films
- Distributed by: Thirumeni Pictures
- Release date: 21 October 1977
- Country: India
- Language: Malayalam

Jagadguru Aadisankaran is a 1977 Indian Malayalam film, directed and produced by P. Bhaskaran. The film stars Muralimohan, Kaviyoor Ponnamma, O. Ramdas and Sankaradi in the lead roles. The story revolves around the life, philosophies and miracles of 8th century saint Adi Shankara.

== Cast ==
- Murali Mohan as Adi Shankara
- Kaviyoor Ponnamma as Kaippilly Aryadevi Antarjanam, Mother of Sankaracharyar
- Manjeri Chandran as Lord Shiva
- Sankaradi as Moorkkathu Namboothiri
- Prathapachandran as Vishnusharma/Sanandan/Padmapada
- C. R. Lakshmi as Omana/Moorkhan's wife
- Mallika Sukumaran as Goddess Saraswati
- Master Raghu as Young Adi Shankara
- N. Govindankutty as Pathala Bhairavan
- Pala Thankam as the poor Lady who donates Amla (Gooseberry)
- Panjabi as Vengu
- Premji as Kaipilly Shivaguru Nambudiri, Father of Sankaracharyar
- Rajakokila as Maharani
- T. P. Madhavan as Govinda Guru
- Thodupuzha Radhakrishnan as Ugrabhairava
- Sreemoolanagaram Vijayan as Amaravi Raja
- Vallathol Unnikrishnan as Mandalakesha/Sureshwara
- Dashaavathaaram Ravikumar as Kumaralbhaktha
- P. R. Menon as Vyasa
- J. A. R. Anand as Velu

== Soundtrack ==
The film has musical score by V. Dakshinamoorthy. K. J. Yesudas won the Kerala State Film Award for Best Singer for the song "Sankara Digvijayam".

| No. | Song | Singers | Lyrics | Length (m:ss) |
|---|---|---|---|---|
| 1 | "Aapovaahidam Sarvam" | K. J. Yesudas, V. Dakshinamoorthy | P. Bhaskaran | |
| 2 | "Aastham Thavadiyam" (Maathruvandanam) | K. J. Yesudas | Adi Shankara | |
| 3 | "Anadyandyamam Param" (Sivabhujangam) | K. J. Yesudas | Adi Shankara | |
| 4 | "Bhajagovindam" | K. J. Yesudas | Adi Shankara | |
| 5 | "Chandrolbhasitha Sekhare" (Sivasthuthi) | P. Jayachandran | Adi Shankara | |
| 6 | "Dadhya Dayanupavano" (Kanakadharasthavam) | P. Leela | Adi Shankara | |
| 7 | "Dravino Da Dravina Sasmarasye" (Jalakarshana Slokam) | P. Jayachandran | Adi Shankara | |
| 8 | "Gange cha Yamune Chaiva Godavari" | P. Leela | Adi Shankara | |
| 9 | "Jaagrath Swapna Sushupthi" (Chandalashtakam) | P. Jayachandran | Adi Shankara | |
| 10 | "Janmadukham Jaraadukham" | P. Jayachandran | Adi Shankara | |
| 11 | "Kumudini Priyathamanudichu" | S. Janaki | P. Bhaskaran | |
| 12 | "Nabhramir Nathoyam" | P. B. Sreenivas | Adi Shankara | |
| 13 | "Namasthe Namasthe" (Vishnubhujangam) | K. J. Yesudas | Adi Shankara | |
| 14 | "Om Poornamada Poornamidam" | V. Dakshinamoorthy, K. P. Brahmanandan | Adi Shankara | |
| 15 | "Paryankatham Vrajathiya" (Guruvandanam) | P. B. Sreenivas | Adi Shankara | |
| 16 | "Sankara Digvijayam" | K. J. Yesudas | P. Bhaskaran | |
| 17 | "Thripurasundari" | K. J. Yesudas | P. Bhaskaran | |
| 18 | "Ugram Veeram Mahavishnum" (Narasimhasthuthi) | K. J. Yesudas | Adi Shankara | |
| 19 | "Yal Bhavi Thal Bhavathi" | P. Jayachandran | Adi Shankara | |
