= Maanasaveena =

- Directed by: Babu Nanthankode
- Written by: Sreekumaran Thampi
- Screenplay by: Sreekumaran Thampi
- Starring: Madhu; Jayabharathi; Adoor Bhasi; Prameela
- Cinematography: Vipin Das
- Edited by: G. Kalyana Sundaram
- Music by: M. L. Srikanth
- Production company: Sree Lakshmi Ganesh Pictures
- Distributed by: Sree Lakshmi Ganesh Pictures
- Release date: 15 October 1976
- Country: India
- Language: Malayalam

Maanasaveena is a 1976 Indian Malayalam film directed by Babu Nanthankode. The film stars Madhu, Jayabharathi, Adoor Bhasi and Prameela in the lead roles. The film has musical score by M. L. Srikanth.

== Cast ==
- Madhu
- Jayabharathi
- Adoor Bhasi
- Prameela
- T. R. Omana
- Raghavan
- Unnimary
- Bahadoor
- Kuthiravattam Pappu
- Vincent

== Soundtrack ==
The music was composed by M. L. Srikanth and the lyrics were written by Sreekumaran Thampi.

No.	Song	Singers	Lyrics	Length (m:ss)
1	"Maayayaam Maareechan"	K. J. Yesudas	Sreekumaran Thampi	
2	"Nilaavo Ninte Punchiriyo"	K. J. Yesudas	Sreekumaran Thampi	
3	"Santhaanagopaalam"	L. R. Eeswari	Sreekumaran Thampi	
4	"Swapnam Tharunnathum"	P. Susheela	Sreekumaran Thampi	
5	"Thulasi Vivaaha Naalil"	S. Janaki	Sreekumaran Thampi	
6	"Urakkam Mizhikalil"	P. Susheela, M. L. Srikanth	Sreekumaran Thampi	
