= Villiyanur Matha =

- DVD cover
- Directed by: K. Thankappan
- Screenplay by: Rev. Fr. P. Aruldass
- Produced by: Rev. Fr. P. Aruldass
- Starring: Sarath Babu
- Music by: G. Devarajan
- Production company: Suguna Films
- Release date: 23 December 1983
- Country: India
- Language: Tamil

Villiyanur Matha is a 1983 Indian Tamil-language film, directed by K. Thankappan. The film, starring Sarath Babu, was released on 23 December 1983.

== Cast ==
- Sarath Babu
- Thengai Srinivasan as Inspector Dheenadayalan
- Y. G. Mahendran as Gopal
- Major Sundarrajan
- V. S. Raghavan
- Jai Ganesh
- Vincent as Father
- Master Haja Sheriff
- Rajkumar (guest appearance)
- Vijayashanti
- Rani Padmini
- Sangeeta
- Manorama
- Prameela
- Baby Anju

== Soundtrack ==
The music was composed by G. Devarajan. For the Malayalam version Lourde Mathavu, lyrics were written by Mankombu Gopalakrishnan.

Tamil track listing
No.	Title	Lyrics	Singer(s)	Length
1.	"Maasila Kanniye"		K. J. Yesudas, Madhuri and chorus
2.	"Naan Kannilatha Pillai"	Vaali	Lathika, K. P. Brahmanandam and chorus
3.	"Naadhar Mudi"		Madhuri
4.	"Kandom Yesunathai"		Chorus
5.	"Ada Ellarukkum"	Vaali	S. P. Balasubrahmanyam
6.	"Maatha"	Pulamaipithan	P. Susheela and chorus
7.	"Un Selai Parakkuthu"	Pulamaipithan	Malaysia Vasudevan, Vani Jairam
8.	"Pootai Thirappathu"	Bharathiyar	Madhuri and chorus

Malayalam track listing
No.	Title	Singer(s)	Length
1.	"Kannukalillaathe"	K. J. Yesudas
2.	"Maathaa Devanaayaki"	P. Susheela
3.	"Naathar Mudi Melirukkum"	P. Madhuri
4.	"Njan Kannillaathoru"
5.	"Paadaam Enneravum"
6.	"Paarile"	K. J. Yesudas, P. Madhuri
7.	"Santhoshamaam"	K. J. Yesudas
8.	"Veenakkambithan"	P. Madhuri, Chorus

== Reception ==
Jayamanmadhan of Kalki questioned if there was no other way to spread the fame of Virgin Mary. They questioned if the plot gets ruined if all the actors shown together, and said it would have been nice if a couple of incidents had been told properly.
