= Aval Oru Devaalayam =

- Directed by: A. B. Raj
- Written by: V. P. Sarathy; Cochin Haneefa (dialogues)
- Screenplay by: V. P. Sarathy
- Produced by: R. S. Sreenivasan
- Starring: Prem Nazir; Jayan; Sheela; Jayabharathi
- Cinematography: P. B. Mani
- Edited by: B. S. Mani
- Music by: M. K. Arjunan
- Production company: Sree Sai Productions
- Distributed by: Sree Sai Productions
- Release date: 5 May 1977
- Country: India
- Language: Malayalam

Aval Oru Devaalayam is a 1977 Indian Malayalam film, directed by A. B. Raj and produced by R. S. Sreenivasan. The film stars Prem Nazir, Jayan, Sheela and Jayabharathi in the lead roles. The film has musical score by M. K. Arjunan.

== Cast ==
- Prem Nazir
- Jayan
- Sheela
- Jayabharathi
- Jose Prakash
- Manavalan Joseph
- Sreelatha Namboothiri
- Cochin Haneefa
- Maniyanpilla Raju
- Prathapachandran
- Bahadoor
- G. K. Pillai
- Mallika Sukumaran
- PR Varalekshmi
- Paravoor Bharathan
- Poojappura Ravi
- T. P. Madhavan
- Vanchiyoor Radha
- Vijay Shankar

== Soundtrack ==
The music was composed by M. K. Arjunan and the lyrics were written by Bharanikkavu Sivakumar.

No.	Song	Singers	Lyrics	Length (m:ss)
1	"Aashaane Namukku Thodangam" (Maniyan Chettikku)	C. O. Anto, Zero Babu	Bharanikkavu Sivakumar	
2	"Bhoomithan Pushpaabharanam"	K. J. Yesudas	Bharanikkavu Sivakumar	
3	"Dukhathin Mezhuthiri"	Jency, L. R. Anjali	Bharanikkavu Sivakumar	
4	"Naarayanakkili"	P. Susheela, Chorus, Jency	Bharanikkavu Sivakumar	
5	"Njanoru Shakthi"	P. Susheela	Bharanikkavu Sivakumar	
6	"Pandu Pandoru Chithira"	P. Susheela	Bharanikkavu Sivakumar	
