= Jesus (1973 film) =

- Directed by: P. A. Thomas
- Written by: Thomas Pictures Unit
- Screenplay by: P. A. Thomas
- Produced by: Thomas
- Starring: Muralidas; Thikkurissy; Gemini Ganesan; M. N. Nambiar; K. P. Ummar; Jose Prakash; Ushakumari; V. K. Ramasamy; Jayabharathi; Jayalalithaa
- Music by: K. J. Yesudas; M. S. Viswanathan; Alleppey Ranganath; Joseph Krishna
- Production company: Universal Pictures
- Distributed by: Thirumeni Pictures
- Release date: 21 December 1973
- Country: India
- Language: Malayalam
- Budget: ₹1 million (US$10,000)
- Box office: ₹11.6 million (US$120,000)

Jesus is a 1973 Indian Malayalam-language film directed by P. A. Thomas and starring Murali Das, Gemini Ganesan, Jayabharathi, Jayalalithaa, Ushakumari, M. N. Nambiar, K. P. Ummar, Jose Prakash, Bahadoor and V. K. Ramasamy. The film was also dubbed in Tamil and Telugu. It was Jayalalithaa's only Malayalam film.

== Plot ==
The story is based on Christian beliefs. King Herod has ruled Judea for over 37 years and believes himself to be supreme. When three wise men from the Far East come to visit him, he is initially pleased, but this pleasure turns to anger when he finds out that they have traveled all the way to witness the birth of the son of God. After they depart, he instructs his Prime Minister to kill all children under the age of two years. Herod's instructions are carried out, but they don't find the baby Jesus, born in a stable in Bethlehem. Jesus, son of Joseph and virgin Mary, has been destined to lead mankind to a better path but must face many challenges, temptations and betrayal from ones he trusted the most, including humiliation, torture, crucifixion, and resurrection.

== Cast ==
- Muralidas as Jesus
- Gemini Ganesan as John the Baptist
- Thikkurissy Sukumaran Nair as King Herod
- K. P. Ummer as Herod Antipas
- Raji as Mary
- Balachandra Menon as Balthazar (Magus)
- Ushakumari as Mary Magdalene
- Jayabharathi as Saint Veronica
- Jayalalithaa as Salome
- Jose Prakash as Annas
- Prameela as Martha
- M. N. Nambiar as Judas
- Major Sundarrajan as Pontius Pilate
- Mumtaz as Mariyam a rich prostitute
- O. A. K. Thevar as Satan
- G. K. Pillai as Caiaphas
- V. K. Ramasamy as Saint Peter
- Vincent as John the Apostle
- Innocent as a courtier in King Herod's court
- Khadeeja
- Srikanth as goat rider

== Soundtrack ==
The music was composed by K. J. Yesudas, M. S. Viswanathan, Alleppey Ranganath and Joseph Krishna and the lyrics were written by Sreekumaran Thampi, P. Bhaskaran, Bharanikkavu Sivakumar, Augustine Vanchimala and Vayalar Ramavarma. Alleppey Ranganath and Joseph Krishna made their debut as music director through this film.

No.	Song	Music director	Singers	Lyrics	Length (m:ss)
1	"Athyunnathangalil Vaazhtheppedum" (Raajaavin Raajaavezhunnellunnu)	Joseph Krishna	P. Jayachandran, B. Vasantha, Chorus	Sreekumaran Thampi	
2	"Ente Munthirichaarino"	M. S. Viswanathan	L. R. Eswari	P. Bhaskaran	
3	"Gaagulthaa Malakale"	Alleppey Ranganath	K. J. Yesudas	Bharanikkavu Sivakumar	
4	"Hosana"	K. J. Yesudas	P. Jayachandran, P. Leela, K. P. Brahmanandan, Chorus	Augustine Vanchimala	
5	"Loreya" (Bit)	K. J. Yesudas	Chorus		
6	"Yahoodiya"	Joseph Krishna	P. Susheela	Vayalar Ramavarma	

== See also ==
- List of Easter films
