= Sambhavami Yuge Yuge =

1972 film by A. B. Raj

- Directed by: A. B. Raj
- Written by: K. P. Kottarakkara
- Screenplay by: K. P. Kottarakkara
- Produced by: K. P. Kottarakkara
- Starring: Prem Nazir, Vijayasree, Adoor Bhasi, K.P.Ummar, Jose Prakash; Prameela
- Cinematography: J. G. Vijayam
- Edited by: K. Sankunni
- Music by: M. S. Baburaj
- Production company: Ganesh Pictures
- Distributed by: Ganesh Pictures
- Release date: 20 June 1972
- Country: India
- Language: Malayalam

Sambhavami Yuge Yuge (transl. I will come back millennium after millennium) is a 1972 Indian Malayalam-language film, directed by A. B. Raj and produced by K. P. Kottarakkara. The film stars Prem Nazir, Adoor Bhasi, Jose Prakash and Prameela in the lead roles. The film's musical score was composed by M. S. Baburaj.

== Cast ==
- Prem Nazir as Vasu
- Adoor Bhasi as Velu
- K. P. Ummer as Raju
- Jose Prakash as Balan
- Prameela
- Sankaradi as jeweler Nagappan Nair
- T. S. Muthaiah
- Adoor Bhavani as Kalyani Amma
- Khadeeja
- N. Govindankutty
- Sadhana as Meena
- Vijayasree as Sumathi
- Kunchan

== Soundtrack ==
The music was composed by M. S. Baburaj and the lyrics were written by Sreekumaran Thampi.

No.	Song	Singers	Lyrics	Length (m:ss)
1	"Ammayallaathoru Daivamundo"	P. Jayachandran, Chorus	Sreekumaran Thampi	
2	"Bhagavaan Bhagavathgeethayil"	K. J. Yesudas	Sreekumaran Thampi	
3	"Ellaam Maayajaalam"	K. J. Yesudas, P. Jayachandran	Sreekumaran Thampi	
4	"Mookkillaaraajyathe"	K. J. Yesudas, P. Susheeladevi	Sreekumaran Thampi	
5	"Naadodimannante"	P. Jayachandran, P. Leela, M. S. Baburaj	Sreekumaran Thampi	
6	"Thuduthude Thudikkunnu"	P. Jayachandran, K. P. Brahmanandan, B. Vasantha	Sreekumaran Thampi	
