= Niramulla Ravulkal =

- Directed by: N. Sankaran Nair
- Written by: Cheri Viswanathan
- Screenplay by: Cheri Viswanathan
- Produced by: S. Kumar
- Starring: Prameela; Unnimary; Vincent
- Music by: K. J. Joy
- Production company: Sastha Productions
- Distributed by: Sastha Productions
- Release date: 7 March 1986
- Country: India
- Language: Malayalam

Niramulla Ravulkal is a 1986 Indian Malayalam film, directed by N. Sankaran Nair and produced by S. Kumar. The film stars Suresh Gopi, Prameela, Unnimary and Vincent in the lead roles. The film has a musical score by K. J. Joy.

== Plot ==
Radha works in a finance company. Her father and stepmother live on her salary. Her father drinks alcohol with Balan Pillai, her mother's lover. The fraud financier tries to rape her, but she escapes, quitting the job. Balan Pillai takes her to town offering a job, and leads her to a brothel. There the inspector takes her chastity. The cruel brothel owner beats the inmates. Peter, a thief, helps her escape. Ravunni takes her in disguise of vigilance. Ravunni keeps a polished brothel. Sarada, a village girl, comes to this house to take her home. Once she tells her mother about her job. then they do not allow her to join in her sister's marriage. She commits suicide. Radha loses hope that her lover will accept her. She desires to remain in the job. Radha joins company with contractor Peethambaran. There she meets excise commissioner Sudevan and MLA Kumaran. Peethambaran treats minister with a girl, but it was his own daughter. He kills her and tries to make it look like a suicide. Radha frees a girl from attackers and helps her to reach home. It was Balan Pillai's house. He was paralyzed. He confesses. The inspector also confesses in his deeds to Radha. The inspector takes Peethambaran into custody. Her lover comes to accept her, but she takes poison.

== Cast ==
- Vincent as Financier
- Ashwathy as Radha
- Shubha as Radha's mother
- Sathaar as Balan Pilla
- Achankunju as Sreedran Pilla (Radha's father)
- Bheeman Raghu as Police Inspector who violates Radha's virginity as her first client at brothel
- Jagathy Sreekumar as Vigilance / Ravunni
- Devan as Radha's lover
- Poojappura Ravi as Peter
- Lalithasree as Meeramma (Brothel Madam)
- Soorya as Sarada
- Bhagyalakshmi (actress) (Sarada's Sister)
- Bahadoor as Sarada's father
- Suresh Gopi as Customer who gets to pop Sarada's cherry
- Prameela as Ravunnis's wife
- Unnimary as a Call Girl
- Thodupuzha Vasanthi as Sarada's mother
- Jose Prakash as Excise Commissioner Sudevan
- Prathapachandran
- Janardanan as MLA Kumaran
- Kundara Johnny as Contractor Peethambaran
- Saleema as Contractor Peethambaran's daughter

== Soundtrack ==
The music was composed by K. J. Joy and the lyrics were written by Poovachal Khader.

No.	Song	Singers	Length (m:ss)
1	"Prakaashamaay Manassil"	K. J. Yesudas	
