= Marunnattil Oru Malayali =

- Directed by: A. B. Raj
- Written by: V. Devan; S. L. Puram Sadanandan (dialogues)
- Screenplay by: S. L. Puram Sadanandan
- Produced by: T. E. Vasudevan
- Starring: Prem Nazir; Vijayasree; Adoor Bhasi; Prameela; Sankaradi
- Cinematography: P. Dathu
- Edited by: B. S. Mani
- Music by: V. Dakshinamoorthy
- Production company: Jaya Maruthi
- Release date: 24 September 1971
- Country: India
- Language: Malayalam

Marunnattil Oru Malayali (transl. Abroad one Malayali) is a 1971 Indian Malayalam-language comedy film, directed by A. B. Raj and produced by T. E. Vasudevan. The film stars Prem Nazir, Adoor Bhasi, Prameela and Sankaradi. It was released on 24 September 1971. The film was remade in Telugu as Sri Rajeswarivilas Coffee Club.

== Plot ==
Mathew reaches Chennai to look for a job. He is unsuccessful and increasingly getting frustrated at not getting a job. One day he over hears, the Brahmin hotel owner, Sheshadri Iyer, telling a man looking for a job that he hires only Brahmans. Mathew pretends to be a Brahman called Vilvaadiri Iyer and secures a job at the hotel as waiter. His parents are happy that he got a job, though they do not know the circumstances under which he got a job. Since he has a job, his parents decide to get their first daughter married. Mathew borrows money from Sheshadri Iyer and sends it home to be given as dowry for his sister. In the meantime the daughter of Sheshadri Iyer falls in love with Mathew. Sheshadri Iyer comes to know and is willing to marry them both. Mathew then reveals the truth that he is a Christian. Sheshadri Iyer turns out to be a Christian as well. He had married a Brahman lady and changed his name when he too had difficulty finding a job in Chennai. Mathew and Sheshadri Iyer's daughter get married.

== Cast ==
- Prem Nazir as Mathew/Vilvaadiri Iyer
- Vijayasree as Geetha
- Adoor Bhasi as Narasimha Iyer
- Prameela as Shoshamma
- Sankaradi as Sheshadri Iyer
- S. P. Pillai as Vittal
- Alummoodan as Chandikunju
- Paravoor Bharathan as Kariyaachan
- Philomina as Mathew's Mother
- Sadhana
- Paul Vengola
- Panjabi
- N. Govindankutty
- Nellikode Bhaskaran
- C. A. Balan
- Pala Thankam
- Radhamani

== Soundtrack ==
The music was composed by V. Dakshinamoorthy and the lyrics were written by Sreekumaran Thampi.

Song	Singers
"Asoka Poornima"	K. J. Yesudas
"Govardhana Giri"	S. Janaki
"Kaali Bhadrakali"	P. Jayachandran, P. Leela, Chorus
"Manassilunaroo"	K. J. Yesudas, S. Janaki
"Swargavaathilekaadashi"	P. Leela
