= Kannur Deluxe =

1969 Malayalam movie

- Directed by: A. B. Raj
- Screenplay by: S. L. Puram Sadanandan
- Story by: V. Devan
- Produced by: T. E. Vasudevan
- Starring: Prem Nazir; Sheela; Adoor Bhasi; Ammini
- Cinematography: T. N. Krishnankutty Nair
- Edited by: T. R. Sreenivasalu
- Music by: V. Dakshinamoorthy
- Production company: Jaya Maruthi
- Release date: 16 May 1969
- Country: India
- Language: Malayalam

Kannur Deluxe is a 1969 Indian Malayalam-language thriller film, directed by A. B. Raj and produced by T. E. Vasudevan who wrote the story under the pseudonym V. Devan. It is the first road movie in Malayalam which pivots on a theft that occurs in a bus and stars Prem Nazir, Sheela and Adoor Bhasi. The film was released on 16 May 1969.

== Plot ==
Jayasree runs away from her home to avoid marrying an old man. In Thiruvananthapuram she is harassed by some city wastrels and seeks refuge in K.B. Pillai's house. Pillai, a businessman, takes pity on her and appoints her in his office. His son Venugopal takes a liking to her.

Pillai sends Jayasree to Kozhikode with two bundles of currency notes worth Rs. 25,000 rupees to be paid to his partners KBS Nair and Abdul Kader as part of their share of the business profit. One of the bundles comprised counterfeit currency notes. She is instructed to hand over the money to Abdul Kader at the Kozhikode bus stand. Jayasree travels by Kannur Deluxe.

On the way, she finds that the bag containing the money is replaced by a similar bag. When alerted, the conductor finds one passenger missing. He immediately takes the driver's seat, reverses, changes the destination board to Thiruvananthapuram and speeds in that direction.

Gopalakrishnan, who had stolen Jayasree's bag, gets into the bus without knowing that it is the same bus from where he had alighted and is arrested by the police at Kayamkulam. The police find the fake currency, but cleverly hands over the entire money to Jayasree.

A mentally challenged Namboodiri and his escort Chandu get into the bus from Kayamkulam. The bus reaches Kozhikode. But Abdul Kader does not come to collect the money. Jayasree goes to KBS Nair's office. On the way she is attacked by Dineshan who has been sent by Nair to track her. Namboodiri and Chandu come to her rescue. K.B. Pillai reaches Nair's office at Kozhikode. The police also reach the office to arrest Jayasree.

And now for the climax. Namboodiri and Chandu reveal their true identities. They are police officers deputed to investigate cases related to fake currency and Jayasree is an officer from the Central Intelligence Department. KBS Nair, K.B. Pillai and Abdul Kader are arrested.

== Cast ==
- Prem Nazir as Thirumeni /CID Officer
- Adoor Bhasi as Chanthu, Thirumeni's Assistant/Assi. CID Officer
- K. P. Ummer as Venu, K. B. Pillai's son
- Sankaradi as Kammath, a Passenger
- Sheela as Jayashree / Lady on the bus
- N. Govindan Kutty as KBS Nair
- Jose Prakash as Gopalakrishnan, the thief
- T. R. Omana as K G Pillai's wife
- Nellikkodu Bhaskaran as Bus conductor
- G. K. Pillai as K. B. Pillai
- Paravoor Bharathan as K B Pillai's company manager
- P. Sreekumar K R Radha a Job aspirant
- Ammini
- Abbas
- Kottayam Chellappan
- Paappi
- K. Radhakrishnan
- M. Radhakrishnan

== Production ==
The film is perhaps the first road movie in Malayalam. A real life incident that occurred at Cherthala in Alappuzha district of Kerala inspired the modus operandi used to arrest the thief in the film. Major portions of the film were shot inside Kannur Deluxe, a KSRTC bus service between Trivandrum and Kannur that was started in 1967 and is still on. The indoor portions were shot at Vahini, Arunachalam, and Newton Studios. I. V. Sasi worked as assistant director in the film.

== Soundtrack ==
The music was composed by V. Dakshinamoorthy and the lyrics were written by Sreekumaran Thampi.

Song	Singers
"Ee Muhabathenthoru"	K. J. Yesudas, S. Janaki, P. B. Sreenivas
"Ethra Chirichaalum"	K. J. Yesudas
"Kannundaayathu Ninne"	P. Leela, P. B. Sreenivas
"Marakkaan Kazhiyumo"	Kamukara
"Thaippooyakkaavadiyaattam"	K. J. Yesudas
"Thulliyodum Pullimaane"	P. Jayachandran
"Varumallo Ravil"	S. Janaki

== Historical importance ==
The film helped the Kerala State Road Transport Corporation (KSRTC) to win a trademark case against the Karnataka Road Transport Corporation by submitting its scenes with the KSRTC logo as prime evidence. The scenes were used to prove that the Transport Corporation existed in Kerala even before the Karnataka RTC.
