= Interview (1973 film) =

- Directed by: J. Sasikumar
- Written by: S. L. Puram Sadanandan
- Screenplay by: S. L. Puram Sadanandan
- Produced by: Thiruppathi Chettiyar
- Starring: Prem Nazir; Jayabharathi; Kaviyoor Ponnamma; Adoor Bhasi
- Cinematography: C. J. Mohan
- Edited by: K. Sankunni
- Music by: V. Dakshinamoorthy
- Production company: Evershine
- Distributed by: Evershine
- Release date: 12 October 1973
- Country: India
- Language: Malayalam

Interview is a 1973 Indian Malayalam-language film directed by J. Sasikumar and produced by Thiruppathi Chettiyar. The film stars Prem Nazir, Jayabharathi, Kaviyoor Ponnamma and Adoor Bhasi in the lead roles. The film has musical score by V. Dakshinamoorthy.

== Cast ==
- Prem Nazir as Vijayan
- Jayabharathi as Susheela
- Kaviyoor Ponnamma as Saraswathi
- Adoor Bhasi as Velu Pilla
- Sankaradi as Govinda Pilla
- Sreelatha Namboothiri as Ambika
- Bahadoor as Kuttappan
- Sujatha as Sreedevi
- T. R. Omana as Shankari
- T. S. Muthaiah as Keshava Pilla
- Muthukulam Raghava Pilla as Sekhara Pilla
- Pala Thankam as Susheela's mother
- Thodupuzha Radhakrishnan as Balakrishnan
- P. R. Menon as Panchayath President
- Mookkannoor Sebastian
- Hema
- Sathi
- Jose
- Hari
- Latha Raju
- C. I. Balan

== Soundtrack ==
The music was composed by V. Dakshinamoorthy and the lyrics were written by Vayalar Ramavarma.

No.	Song	Singers	Lyrics	Length (m:ss)
1	"Ammaykkum Achanum"	P. Susheela	Vayalar Ramavarma	
2	"Kanakam Moolam Dukham"	K. P. Brahmanandan	Vayalar Ramavarma	
3	"Maala Maala Varanamaala"	L. R. Eeswari	Vayalar Ramavarma	
4	"Naleekalochane"	K. J. Yesudas	Vayalar Ramavarma	
5	"Uthara Madhuraapuriyil"	K. J. Yesudas, P. Susheela, Chorus	Vayalar Ramavarma	
