= Aadhya Paadam =

Aadyapaadam
- Poster
- Directed by: Adoor Bhasi
- Written by: S. L. Puram Sadanandan
- Based on: Evariki Vare Yamuna Theere (Telugu)
- Produced by: C. V. Hariharan
- Starring: Kamal Haasan; Sridevi; Sheela; Jayan
- Cinematography: S. S. Maniyan
- Edited by: Vijayanand
- Music by: A. T. Ummer
- Production company: Suguna Screen
- Distributed by: Suguna Screen
- Release date: 10 November 1977
- Country: India
- Language: Malayalam

Aadhya Paadam (transl. First lesson) is a 1977 Indian Malayalam-language film, directed by Adoor Bhasi. The film stars Kamal Haasan, Sheela, Sridevi and Jayan, and features a musical score by A. T. Ummer. It was a remake of Telugu film Evariki Vare Yamuna Theere (1974).

== Cast ==
- Kamal Haasan
- Sridevi
- Sheela
- Jayan
- Sukumari
- Jagathy Sreekumar
- Adoor Bhasi
- Sankaradi
- Sreelatha Namboothiri
- Raghavan
- Paul Vengola
- Prathapachandran
- Harippad Soman
- J. A. R. Anand
- K. P. Ummer
- Kunchan
- Mallika Sukumaran
- Meena
- Nellikode Bhaskaran
- Pala Thankam
- Paravoor Bharathan
- T. P. Madhavan
- Treesa

== Soundtrack ==
The music was composed by A. T. Ummer and the lyrics were written by Sreekumaran Thampi.

No.	Song	Singers	Lyrics	Length (m:ss)
1	"Bhagavaan Parathaan"	K. J. Yesudas, K. P. Brahmanandan	Sreekumaran Thampi	
2	"Karanju Konde"	K. J. Yesudas	Sreekumaran Thampi	
3	"Manushya Ninte Niramethu"	K. J. Yesudas	Sreekumaran Thampi	
4	"Pushpamangalya Rathriyil"	Vani Jairam, K. P. Brahmanandan	Sreekumaran Thampi	

== Release ==
Aadhya Paadam was released on 10 November 1977, and the final length of the film was 4,395.38 metres (14,420.5 ft).
