= Crime Branch (film) =

- Directed by: K. S. Gopalakrishnan
- Written by: Pappanamkodu Lakshmanan
- Screenplay by: Pappanamkodu Lakshmanan
- Starring: Jagathy Sreekumar; Innocent; P. C. George; Prameela
- Cinematography: V. Karunakaran
- Edited by: N. Gopalakrishnan
- Music by: M. G. Radhakrishnan
- Production company: GG Films
- Distributed by: GG Films
- Release date: 26 January 1990
- Country: India
- Language: Malayalam

Crime Branch is a 1990 Indian Malayalam-language film, directed by K. S. Gopalakrishnan. The film stars Jagathy Sreekumar, Innocent, P. C. George and Prameela. The film has musical score by MG Radhakrishnan.

== Plot ==
The village temple nearby is a bar, which is run by rich and influential Pushkaran Muthalali. Pushkaran's son Shaji tries to attack Ambujam, but this is stopped by Mukundan Nair and Arasan. Arasan, being a home minister, is close to Pushkaran Muthalali. Now Mukundan, supported by the public, do a protest to stop the bar. Pushkaran Muthalali tries in all ways to stop the protest, but Mukundan won't give up till the bar is closed. Now inspector Susheelan conspires with Pushkaran Muthalali and Arasan to create a fight near the protest area and thus police can arrest everybody. The plan works well at the protest area, where the bar gundas throw glass bottles near the protest area and this provokes Babu and people. A fight happens. Police come and arrest all. Mukundan is also arrested, but becomes ill and gets admitted to hospital. Now again, is a conspiracy to kill Mukundan. At hospital, Pushkaran Muthalali tells Mukundan that he is closing the bar. By evening, Mukundan develops chest pain and body weakness and vomits out blood. Mukundan tells Ambujam that he is poisoned by giving lime juice. The scene shifts to a sudden hearing of Mukundan's death by heart attack as this news is spread everywhere by cunning Arasan. Later, Ambujam is seen hospitalised. Babu and Sunitha visit Ambujam, who is not responding. Now in Pushkaran's area, Pushkaran Muthalali gives 10000Rs to Dr Suny and says not to tell anybody and that his family will be freed now. Dr Suny accepts and takes leave for a few days. Ambujam replies to Babu that Mukundan was poisoned. Babu and Sunitha file a case in Crime branch. Balchandran, with assistant from Alex and Narendra are appointed. Alex, a forensic department staffer, recognises poisoning from the cremated body remains. Balchandran gets a confession from the head nurse of hospital that it was poisoning by giving slow poison in the glucose drip. Balchandran now asks Arasan to be in their office for an enquiry. Now Pushkaran Muthalali tells Balachandran that Balachandran's sister Sunitha and Babu are in love. Balchandran at house see Sunitha and Babu coming together, beats Sunitha and threatens Babu to get out. Later, Balchandran fixes the marriage of Sunitha. On the day before marriage, Sunitha and Babu plan to run away. But Balchandran catches Babu and in the dark, a fight occurs. Next day, Babu is shown dead at a riverside. Here, Sunitha tells Inspector Susheelan that Balachandran has killed. Inspector Susheelan arrests Balachandran and at the same time, Pujapu Ravi destroys strong evidence which was to be submitted to the IG. Later, Balachandran is sentenced to life imprisonment. Balachandran escapes from jail. Balachandran catches Arasan, who says it was poisoning and only Pushkaran knows. Next, Shaji is caught where a fight occurs and Pushkaran comes at last and surrenders. Finally, constable Shankaran Pillai tells that Susheelan has killed Babu for catching Susheelan while attempting to rape Ambujam. Balachandran fights and defeats Susheelan. Now the Crime branch chief and others come and arrest everybody.

== Cast ==
- Jagathy Sreekumar as Alex
- P. C. George as Crime Branch SP
- Prameela as Nurse Leelamma
- Rohini as Sunitha
- Santhosh as Shaji
- Captain Raju as CI Balachandran
- James
- Kalaranjini as Ambujam
- Sukumaran as SI Susheelan
- Bahadoor as Mukundan Nair
- Janardhanan as Charukeshan
- Lalithasree as Mathilakam Kamalamma
- M. G. Soman as Pushkaran
- Poojappura Ravi as PC Sankara Pilla
- Ragini as Sarala's wife
- Santhakumari as Lakshmiyamma
- Vijayaraghavan as Babu
- Vincent as Anandan
- Prince as Prince
- Bobby Kottarakkara
- Kanakalatha as Adv Latha
- KPAC Sunny as Doctor

== Soundtrack ==
The music was composed by M. G. Radhakrishnan and the lyrics were written by Chunakkara Ramankutty.

No.	Song	Singers	Lyrics	Length (m:ss)
1	"Deepaavali Kazhinju"	M. G. Sreekumar	Chunakkara Ramankutty	
2	"Pushpashayyayil"	M. G. Sreekumar, R. Usha	Chunakkara Ramankutty	
3	"Swapnam Kandu"		Chunakkara Ramankutty	
