= Bhaaryaavijayam =

- Directed by: A. B. Raj
- Written by: Gopu; Sreekumaran Thampi (dialogues)
- Screenplay by: Sreekumaran Thampi
- Produced by: Sadanandan
- Starring: Jayabharathi; Vincent
- Music by: M. K. Arjunan
- Production company: Shanmukham Arts
- Distributed by: Shanmukham Arts
- Release date: 14 October 1977
- Country: India
- Language: Malayalam

Bhaaryaavijayam is a 1977 Indian Malayalam film, directed by A. B. Raj and produced by Sadanandan. The film stars Jayabharathi and Vincent in the lead roles. The film has musical score by M. K. Arjunan.

== Cast ==
- Jayabharathi
- Vincent

== Soundtrack ==
The music was composed by M. K. Arjunan and the lyrics were written by Sreekumaran Thampi.

No.	Song	Singers	Lyrics	Length (m:ss)
1	"April Maasathil"	Ambili	Sreekumaran Thampi	
2	"Kaamadevanenikku Thanna"	P. Jayachandran	Sreekumaran Thampi	
3	"Kadalum Karayum"	P. Susheela, P. Jayachandran	Sreekumaran Thampi	
4	"Madhuvidhuvin Maadhavamen"	Vani Jairam	Sreekumaran Thampi	
5	"Vaarmudi Pinnitharaam"	K. P. Brahmanandan	Sreekumaran Thampi	
