= Unnai Suttrum Ulagam =

- Title card
- Directed by: G. Subramaniya Reddiar
- Written by: G. Subramaniya Reddiar
- Starring: Jayalalithaa
- Cinematography: P. Bhaskar Rao
- Edited by: K. Narayanan
- Music by: Shankar–Ganesh
- Production company: Sri Navaneetha Pictures
- Release date: 29 April 1977
- Country: India
- Language: Tamil

Unnai Suttrum Ulagam (transl. The world revolves around you) is a 1977 Indian Tamil-language drama film written and directed by G. Subramaniya Reddiar. The film stars Jayalalithaa, leading an ensemble cast including Prameela, Vidhubala, Kamal Haasan, Savithri and Vijayakumar. Jayalalithaa played the elder sister who sacrifices her happiness for the sake of her siblings. The film was released on 29 April 1977, and Jayalalithaa won the Tamil Nadu Cinema Fan Award for Best Actress.

== Plot ==
Lakshmi is a playful village belle and Dhanabakiyam is her well wisher. Dhanabakiyam's husband leaves her. Lakshmi is the elder sister of Seetha, Raja and Mala. She takes care of her all siblings but Raja disrespects her. Seetha dies while pregnant. How Lakshmi saves her family forms the crux of the story.

== Cast ==
Lead actresses

- Jayalalithaa as Lakshmi
- Prameela as Mala
- Vidhubala as Seetha
- Usharani as Rekha

Supporting actresses

- Sachu as Pangajam
- Gandhimathi as House maid
- Seethalakshmi as Ramu's mother
- Tambaram Lalitha
- Sridevi as young Seetha
- Savithri as Dhanabakiyam (uncredited)

Guest actresses

- G. Varalakshmi as Reka's grandmother
- S. Varalakshmi as Ramu's elder sister
- Manorama as an actress

Lead actors

- Kamal Haasan as Raja
- Vijayakumar as Sekar
- Vincent as Ramu

Supporting actors

- T. K. Bhagavathi as Ramu's brother-in-law
- Shanmugasundaram
- V. S. Raghavan as Lakshmi's father

Guest actors

- Ashokan
- Cho
- M. R. R. Vasu
- A. V. M. Rajan as a film director

== Production ==
The film was launched on 21 February 1974 at AVM Studios. The film marked the directorial debut of producer Subrahmanya Reddiar.

== Soundtrack ==
The music was composed by Shankar–Ganesh and lyrics were written by Vaali.

No.	Title	Singer(s)	Length
1.	"Seethavai Thedi" (Happy)	P. Susheela
2.	"Madrasu Rayilil"	L. R. Eswari, J. Jayalalithaa
3.	"Happy Birthday"	S. P. Balasubrahmanyam, Anjali and Sasirekha
4.	"Seethavai Thedi" (Pathos)	P. Susheela

== Release and reception ==
Unnai Suttrum Ulagam was released on 29 April 1977. Jayalalithaa won the Tamil Nadu Cinema Fan Award for Best Actress. Kanthan of Kalki felt the film thought of something to say and said whatever but somehow it goes around.
