= Saraswathi Yaamam =

- Directed by: Mohan Kumar
- Written by: Vellanad Narayanan
- Screenplay by: Vellanad Narayanan
- Starring: Jagathy Sreekumar; Prameela; Adoor Bhavani; Janardanan
- Edited by: K. Sankunni
- Music by: A. T. Ummer
- Production companies: P&P Productions
- Distributed by: P&P Productions
- Release date: 14 June 1980
- Country: India
- Language: Malayalam

Saraswathi Yaamam is a 1980 Indian Malayalam film, directed by Mohan Kumar. The film stars Jagathy Sreekumar, Prameela, Adoor Bhavani and Janardanan in the lead roles. The film has musical score by A. T. Ummer.

== Cast ==
- Jagathy Sreekumar as Sreedhara Pilla
- Prameela as Prameela
- Adoor Bhavani as Lakshmikutty
- Janardanan as Madhu
- M. G. Soman as Ramankutty
- P. K. Abraham as Muthalali
- Bhavani as Salini
- Raghavan as Gopi
- Poojappura Ravi as Ganesh
- Silk Smitha as Padmam
- Thrissur Elsy as Madhavi
- Suchitra as Bhavani

== Soundtrack ==
The music was composed by A. T. Ummer and the lyrics were written by Vellanad Narayanan.

No.	Song	Singers	Lyrics	Length (m:ss)
1	"Kulirilam"	S. Janaki	Vellanad Narayanan	
2	"Ninne Punaraan Neettiya"	K. J. Yesudas	Vellanad Narayanan	
3	"Prakrithee Neeyoru"	K. J. Yesudas	Vellanad Narayanan	
4	"Sreeranjini Swararaagini"	K. J. Yesudas	Vellanad Narayanan	
