= Seemantha Puthran =

Seemanthaputhran
- Directed by: A. B. Raj
- Written by: V. P. Sarathy; M. R. Joseph (dialogues)
- Screenplay by: M. R. Joseph
- Produced by: R. S. Sreenivasan
- Starring: Prem Nazir; Jayabharathi; KPAC Lalitha; Adoor Bhasi
- Cinematography: P. B. Mani
- Music by: M. K. Arjunan
- Production company: Sree Sai Productions
- Distributed by: Sree Sai Productions
- Release date: 5 March 1976
- Country: India
- Language: Malayalam

Seemanthaputhran (transl. Beloved son) is a 1976 Indian Malayalam film directed by A. B. Raj and produced by R. S. Sreenivasan. The film stars Prem Nazir, Jayabharathi, KPAC Lalitha and Adoor Bhasi in the lead roles. The musical score was composed by M. K. Arjunan.

== Cast ==
- Prem Nazir
- Jayabharathi
- KPAC Lalitha
- Adoor Bhasi
- Jose Prakash
- Sreelatha Namboothiri
- Baby Padmini
- G. K. Pillai
- MG Soman

== Soundtrack ==
The music was composed by M. K. Arjunan and the lyrics were written by Sreekumaran Thampi.

No.	Song	Singers	Lyrics	Length (m:ss)
1	"Naadum Veedum Illaatha"	K. J. Yesudas	Sreekumaran Thampi	
2	"Pookkaleppole"	P. Susheela	Sreekumaran Thampi	
3	"Sankalpathin Swarnnamaram"	K. J. Yesudas	Sreekumaran Thampi	
4	"Snehathin Kovilil"	P. Susheela	Sreekumaran Thampi	
