= Manasse Ninakku Mangalam =

- Directed by: A. B. Raj
- Produced by: Lekshmi (Thripurasundari)
- Starring: Prem Nazir; Madhu; Menaka; Balan K. Nair
- Cinematography: Gopinath
- Edited by: A. Sukumaran
- Music by: Raveendran
- Production company: Sreenivasa Combines
- Distributed by: Sreenivasa Combines
- Release date: 16 June 1984
- Country: India
- Language: Malayalam

Manasse Ninakku Mangalam is a 1984 Indian Malayalam-language film, directed by A. B. Raj and produced by Lekshmi (Thripurasundari). The film stars Prem Nazir, Madhu, Menaka and Balan K. Nair in the lead roles. The film has musical score by Raveendran.

== Cast ==
- Prem Nazir
- Madhu
- Menaka as Shobha
- Ranipadmini as Geetha
- Balan K. Nair
- Shubha as Shobha's Mother
- Lalu Alex as Soman
- P. R. Varalakshmi

== Soundtrack ==
The music was composed by Raveendran and the lyrics were written by Poovachal Khader.

No.	Song	Singers	Lyrics	Length (m:ss)
1	"Chiriyil njaan"	K. J. Yesudas, S. Janaki	Poovachal Khader	
2	"Daaham Theera Daaham"	S. Janaki	Poovachal Khader	
3	"Manasse Ninakku Mangalam"	K. P. Brahmanandan, Lathika	Poovachal Khader	
4	"Shobhanam Mohanam"	K. J. Yesudas	Poovachal Khader	
