= Kadavul Amaitha Medai =

- Poster
- Directed by: S. P. Muthuraman
- Screenplay by: Vaali
- Story by: Gollapudi Maruti Rao
- Starring: Sivakumar; Sumithra
- Cinematography: Babu
- Edited by: R. Vittal; T. K. Rajan
- Music by: Ilaiyaraaja
- Production company: Trisool Films
- Release date: 7 September 1979
- Country: India
- Language: Tamil

Kadavul Amaitha Medai (transl. The stage set by God) is a 1979 Indian Tamil-language film directed by S. P. Muthuraman. The film stars Sivakumar and Sumithra. It was released on 7 September 1979. The film was a remake of the 1975 Telugu film Devudu Chesina Pelli.

== Plot ==
Boopathi and Laxmi await the return of their son from town, who returns with Radha and tells them that he wants to marry her. His parents agree to the marriage, but soon problems arise.

== Cast ==
- Sivakumar as the postman
- Sumithra as two sisters
- Major Sundarrajan
- V. Gopalakrishnan as the doctor
- Suruli Rajan
- Vadivukkarasi

== Soundtrack ==
The soundtrack was composed by Ilaiyaraaja, and lyrics were written by Vaali. The song "Mayile Mayile" is set in the Carnatic raga Hamsadhvani. It is the first time S. P. Balasubrahmanyam and Jency Anthony sang together. "Thendrale Nee Pesu" was the only song P. B. Sreenivas sang for Ilaiyaraaja in his life.

Track listing
No.	Title	Singer(s)	Length
1.	"Thendrale Nee Pesu"	P. B. Sreenivas
2.	"Mayile Mayile"	S. P. Balasubrahmanyam, Jency Anthony
3.	"Hey Thanni"	Ilaiyaraaja, S. Janaki
4.	"Vaanil Parakkum"	S. Janaki
5.	"Thangathuraiye"	S. P. Sailaja
6.	"Thanjavoor Singari"	S. Janaki
