= Honeymoon (1974 film) =

- Poster
- Directed by: A. B. Raj
- Written by: K. P. Kottarakkara
- Screenplay by: K. P. Kottarakkara
- Produced by: K. P. Kottarakkara
- Starring: Prem Nazir; Jose Prakash; Sankaradi; Alummoodan
- Cinematography: P. B. Mani
- Edited by: K. Sankunni
- Music by: M. K. Arjunan
- Production company: Ganesh Pictures
- Distributed by: Ganesh Pictures
- Release date: 5 December 1974
- Country: India
- Language: Malayalam

Honeymoon is a 1974 Indian Malayalam film, directed by A. B. Raj and produced by K. P. Kottarakkara. The film stars Prem Nazir, Jose Prakash, Sankaradi and Alummoodan in the lead roles. The film had musical score by M. K. Arjunan.

== Cast ==
- Prem Nazir
- Jose Prakash
- Sankaradi
- Alummoodan
- K. R. Vijaya
- Meena
- Sudheer
- Sumithra
- Usharani

== Soundtrack ==
The music was composed by M. K. Arjunan and the lyrics were written by Sreekumaran Thampi.

No.	Song	Singers	Lyrics	Length (m:ss)
1	"Good morning Rama"	L. R. Eeswari	Sreekumaran Thampi	
2	"Good morning Seethe"	K. P. Brahmanandan	Sreekumaran Thampi	
3	"Indrajaala Radhameri"	P. Jayachandran, L. R. Eeswari	Sreekumaran Thampi	
4	"Jalatharangame Paadu"	P. Jayachandran, P. Leela	Sreekumaran Thampi	
5	"Mallikappoovin Madhuragandham"	P. Jayachandran	Sreekumaran Thampi	
6	"Sanmaarggam Theduvin"	P. Jayachandran, Chorus	Sreekumaran Thampi	
7	"Thankakavilil Kunkumamo"	P. Madhuri, K. P. Brahmanandan	Sreekumaran Thampi	
