= Driver Madyapichirunnu =

- Directed by: S. K. Subhash
- Written by: Kallada Sasi
- Screenplay by: Kallada Sasi
- Starring: Sudheer; Kaviyoor Ponnamma; Prameela; Alummoodan; KPAC Sunny
- Edited by: K. Sankunni
- Music by: K. Raghavan
- Production company: Elanjikkal Movies
- Distributed by: Elanjikkal Movies
- Release date: 26 January 1979
- Country: India
- Language: Malayalam

Driver Madyapichirunnu is a 1979 Indian Malayalam film, directed by S. K. Subhash. The film stars Sudheer, Kaviyoor Ponnamma, Prameela, Alummoodan and KPAC Sunny in the lead roles. The film has musical score by K. Raghavan.

== Cast ==
- Sudheer
- Kaviyoor Ponnamma
- Prameela
- Alummoodan
- KPAC Sunny
- Kaduvakulam Antony

== Soundtrack ==
The music was composed by K. Raghavan and the lyrics were written by Kallada Sasi.

No.	Song	Singers	Lyrics	Length (m:ss)
1	"Jeevithamennoru"	P. Jayachandran	Kallada Sasi	
2	"Onnuriyaadaan"	S. Janaki	Kallada Sasi	
3	"Thiramaalaykkoru"	K. J. Yesudas	Kallada Sasi	
