= Masmaram =

- Directed by: Thampi Kannanthanam
- Written by: Saji ram
- Produced by: Thampi Kannanthanam for Jubilant Pictures
- Starring: Suresh Gopi; Arpana Rao; Srividya; Ruchika; Rajan P. Dev; N. F. Varghese; T. R. Omana
- Cinematography: Saloo George
- Edited by: Srikar Prasad
- Music by: S. P. Venkatesh
- Release date: 1997
- Country: India
- Language: Malayalam

Masmaram is a 1997 Indian Malayalam film, directed by Thampi Kannanthanam, starring Suresh Gopi and Aparna Rao in the lead roles. The film was dubbed into Telugu as Sathru Vamsam.

== Plot ==
It is a story of corporate rivalry of two textile tycoons—one who attempts to modernize and gain market share, and one who attempts to use any sorts of evil-doing and make money. The injustice in-between brings forth a lot of unaccountable evil deeds, and for all of it Gautham holds the evil-doer accountable with his life.

== Cast ==
- Suresh Gopi as Gautham Vishwanath
- Arpana Rao as Priyadarshini Das alias Priya
- Rajan P. Dev as Willson Moriz
- Kitty as Darshan Das
- Vijaya Kumar as Jerry, Moriz's son
- Krishna Kumar as ASP Vishnu IPS, (SI Jayamani's son)
- Devan as Munna Bhaai
- Srividya as Mariya Moriz
- Ruthika Singh as Sherin, Moriz's daughter
- T. R. Omana as Darshan Das' mother
- Maniyanpilla Raju as Krishnanunni
- Sathaar as Manager Mahadevan
- Jyothi Meena as Jenny, Moriz's clerk and girlfriend
- Hemanth Ravan as Hemanth
- Kollam Ajith as SI Jayamani
- Abitha as Jasmine, Munna Bhai's daughter
- Prathapachandran as Justice Ramanathan
- N. F. Varghese as Viswanathan
- Jayashree as Madhavi, Vishwanathan's wife
- Vallathol Unnikrishnan as Moriz's secretary

== Soundtrack ==
- Aararo Vijanathayil...
- Annoru Ravil....
- Ezhezhu Sagarangal...
