= Anugraham (1977 film) =

- Directed by: Melattoor Ravi Varma
- Written by: M. R. V. Thoppil Bhasi (dialogues)
- Screenplay by: Thoppil Bhasi
- Produced by: Melattoor Ravi Varma
- Starring: Prem Nazir; Jayabharathi; Vincent; Radha Saluja
- Cinematography: P. L. Roy
- Edited by: G. Venkittaraman
- Music by: Shankar–Ganesh
- Production company: Rainbow Enterprises
- Distributed by: Rainbow Enterprises
- Release date: 1977
- Country: India
- Language: Malayalam

Anugraham is a 1977 Indian Malayalam film, co-written and directed by Melattoor Ravi Varma and produced by Melattoor Ravi Varma. The film stars Prem Nazir, Jayabharathi, Vincent and Radha Saluja in the lead roles. The film has musical score by Shankar–Ganesh.

== Plot ==
Rajan is a postman. He has a younger sister Jyothi, whom he educates after being orphaned at a young age. Their father Major Krishnan was killed in action in the army. On his rounds as a postman, Rajan meets Sharada, the daughter of a widow who lost her son with no knowledge of his whereabouts. Sharada works in a school owned by Sreedhara Menon whose son, Ravi hears her singing one day and compliments her. Sharada develops feelings towards him.

Ravi is in love with Jyothi but his proposal is rebuffed by Rajan who considers him a rich brat. Meanwhile, Ravi finds out that Rajan and Jyoti are the children of his father's friend, Major Krishnan, who had died and whose eyes were donated to his father Sreedhara Menon. After this revelation, Rajan agrees to Ravi and Jyoti's wedding.

Then Rajan comes to know that Sharada has feelings for Ravi, and he gets Jyothi to refuse Ravi's proposal so that Sharada can marry Ravi. Rajan treats Sharada as his sister after her mother's death and feels responsible for her. Jyoti refuses to marry Ravi on the advice of her brother. Ravi is upset. He is told by the school headmaster that Sharada loves him, and Ravi proposes to Sharada. She then reveals to him that Jyoti had denied his marriage proposal so that Ravi would marry Sharada on the advice of her brother Rajan. Ravi and Jyoti are united by Sharada. Rajan gets Sharada and Jyoti married and feels happy that he got both his sisters married as a responsible elder brother. Shreedhara Menon says that Rajan's father would be proud of the sacrifices Rajan made for his sisters. Rajan gets back to work a satisfied man.

== Cast ==
- Prem Nazir as Rajan
- Jayabharathi as Jyothi
- Vincent as Ravi
- Radha Saluja as Sharada
- Bahadoor
- T. R. Omana as Kamakshiyamma
- KPAC Lalitha as Pankajakshiyamma
- Pattom Sadan as Mathew
- Radhika
- Kedamangalam Ali
- Ragava Menon
- Paramu
- Nedumangadu Krishnan
- O. Ramdas
- Prathapachandran as Principal
- Veeran as Joseph contractor
- K. P. Ummer as Sreedhara Menon
- Kunchan as Padmalojanan
- Kunjava
- Master Raghu as young Rajan
- Meena as Ravi's Aunty
- Oduvil Unnikrishnan as Unnikrishnan School master
- P. K. Abraham as Major Krishnan
- Pala Thankam as School teacher
- Paravoor Bharathan as Rowdi Kuttan nair
- Chithra as student at school
- P. K. Abraham as Krishnan
- T. P. Madhavan as Collector T. P. Madhavan

== Soundtrack ==
The music was composed by Shankar–Ganesh and the lyrics written by Mankombu Gopalakrishnan, Vayalar Ramavarma and P. Bhaskaran.

No.	Song	Singers	Lyrics	Length (m:ss)
1	"Karimbu Neerozhukunna"	K. J. Yesudas, Kumari Ramani	Mankombu Gopalakrishnan	
2	"Leelaathilakamaninju"	K. J. Yesudas	Vayalar Ramavarma	
3	"Swarnamayoora Radhathil"	P. Susheela	Mankombu Gopalakrishnan	
4	"Vidyaalathayile"	P. Susheela, Kumari Ramani	P. Bhaskaran	
