= Ayiroor Sadasivan =

Indian singer (1939–2015)

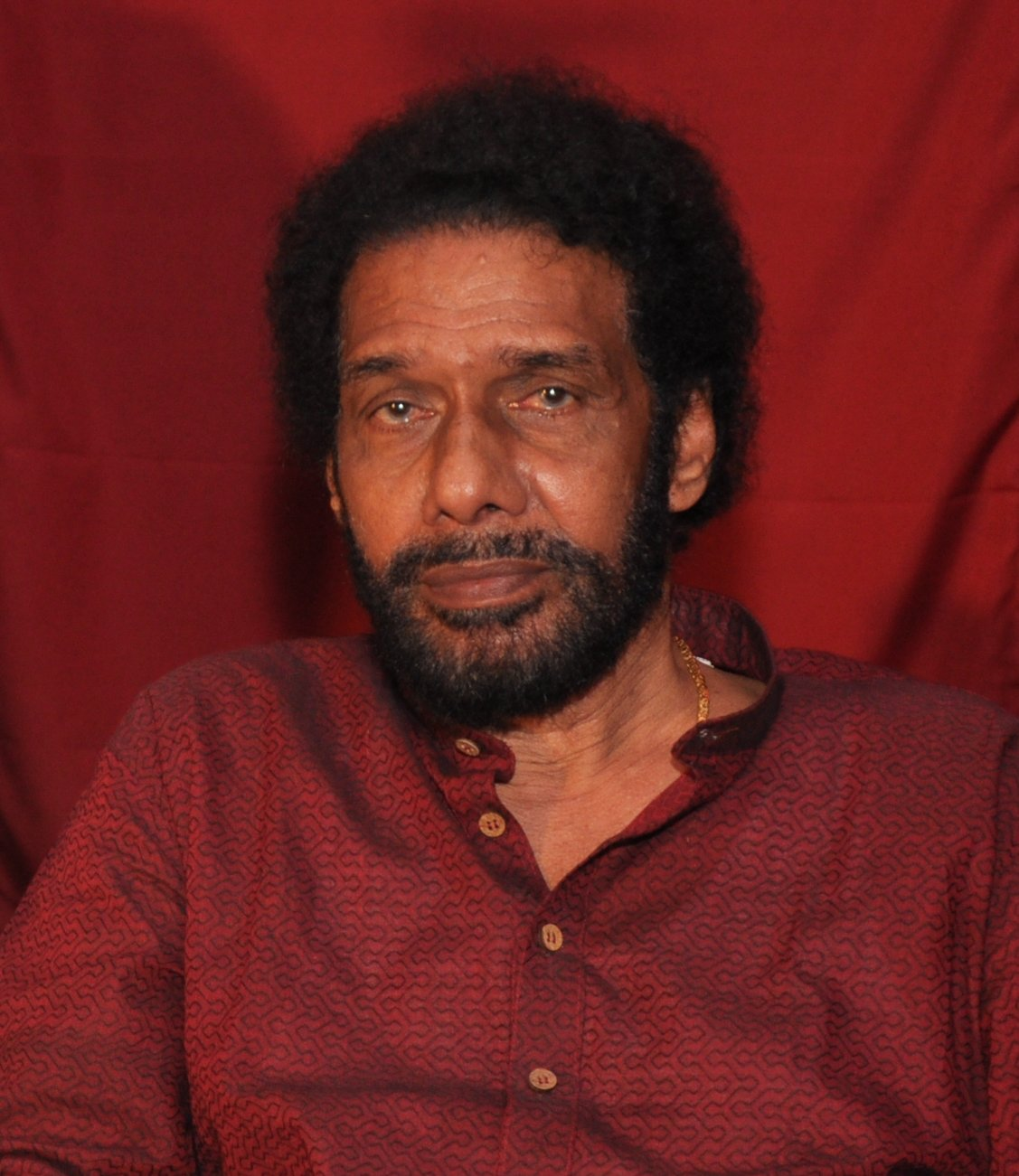
- Born: 19 January 1939; Ayoor,
- Died: 9 April 2015
- Occupation: Playback Singer
- Years active: 1973–1984

Ayiroor Sadasivan (1939 – 9 April 2015) was an Indian playback singer who worked mainly in Malayalam cinema.

== Early life ==
Ayiroor Sadasivan was born in Kerala and learned music from an early age.

== Career ==
Sadasivan sang for many Malayalam films and collaborated with G. Devarajan, Vayalar, Yusufali Kecheri, Sreekumaran Thampi, V. Dakshinamurthy, P. Bhaskaran, Mankombu, K.J. Yesudas and P. Leela.

== Death ==
Sadasivan died in a car accident on 9 April 2015 at the age of 78.

== Awards ==
- 2004: Kerala Sangeetha Nataka Akademi Award (Light Music)
