= Inspector (1968 film) =

- Directed by: M. Krishnan Nair
- Written by: K. Balaji; S. L. Puram Sadanandan (dialogues)
- Produced by: P. I. M. Kasim
- Starring: Prem Nazir; Adoor Bhasi; Thikkurissy Sukumaran Nair; Prameela
- Music by: M. S. Baburaj
- Production company: Sony Pictures
- Distributed by: Sony Pictures
- Release date: 26 April 1968
- Country: India
- Language: Malayalam

Inspector is a 1968 Indian Malayalam-language film, directed by M. Krishnan Nair and produced by P. I. M. Kasim. The film stars Prem Nazir, Adoor Bhasi, Thikkurissy Sukumaran Nair and Prameela. The film had musical score by M. S. Baburaj.

== Cast ==
- Prem Nazir
- Adoor Bhasi
- Thikkurissy Sukumaran Nair
- Prameela
- G. K. Pillai
- Jyothi Lakshmi
- K. P. Ummer
- Kaduvakulam Antony
- Udaya Chandrika

== Soundtrack ==
The music was composed by M. S. Baburaj and the lyrics were written by P. Bhaskaran.

No.	Song	Singers	Lyrics	Length (m:ss)
1	"Aayiramaayiram"	K. J. Yesudas	P. Bhaskaran	
2	"Kanavil Njan Theertha"	S. Janaki	P. Bhaskaran	
3	"Karuthavaavam"	K. J. Yesudas, P. Susheela	P. Bhaskaran	
4	"Madhuvidhu Dinangal"	K. J. Yesudas, C. M. Lakshmi	P. Bhaskaran	
5	"Pathinezhaam Janmadinam"	K. J. Yesudas, P. Susheela	P. Bhaskaran	
6	"That November"	L. R. Eeswari	P. Bhaskaran	
