= Prakadanam =

- Directed by: J. Sasikumar
- Starring: Prathapachandran; Balan K. Nair; M. G. Soman; Ravikumar
- Cinematography: Rajarajan
- Edited by: G. Venkittaraman
- Music by: G. Devarajan
- Production company: Pratham International
- Distributed by: Pratham International
- Release date: 31 October 1980
- Country: India
- Language: Malayalam

Prakadanam is a 1980 Indian Malayalam-language film, directed by J. Sasikumar. The film stars Prathapachandran, Balan K. Nair, M. G. Soman and Ravikumar. The film's score was composed by G. Devarajan.

== Cast ==
- Prathapachandran as Kattukallan
- Balan K. Nair as Chackochan
- M. G. Soman as Jose
- Ravikumar as Devan
- Seema as Preethi
- Jose Prakash as Damodharan
- T. R. Omana as Preethi's mother
- Sathaar as Gopalan
- Prameela as Ammu
- Pala Thankam as Hotel Warden
- Kuthiravattom Pappu as Kamalahasanan
- Bahadoor as Master
- Meena as Gopalan's mother
- Thodupuzha Radhakrishnan as Naanu

== Soundtrack ==
The music was composed by G. Devarajan with lyrics by Poovachal Khader.

| No. | Song | Singers | Lyrics | Length (m:ss) |
|---|---|---|---|---|
| 1 | "Ente Mankudil" | K. J. Yesudas | Poovachal Khader | |
| 2 | "Kaaragriham Kaaragriham" | K. J. Yesudas | Poovachal Khader | |
| 3 | "Kallinkudamoru Parudeesa" | P. Madhuri, Chorus, C. O. Anto | Poovachal Khader | |
| 4 | "Priyane Ninakkayi" | P. Jayachandran, P. Madhuri | Poovachal Khader | |
