= Prameela =

Indian actress

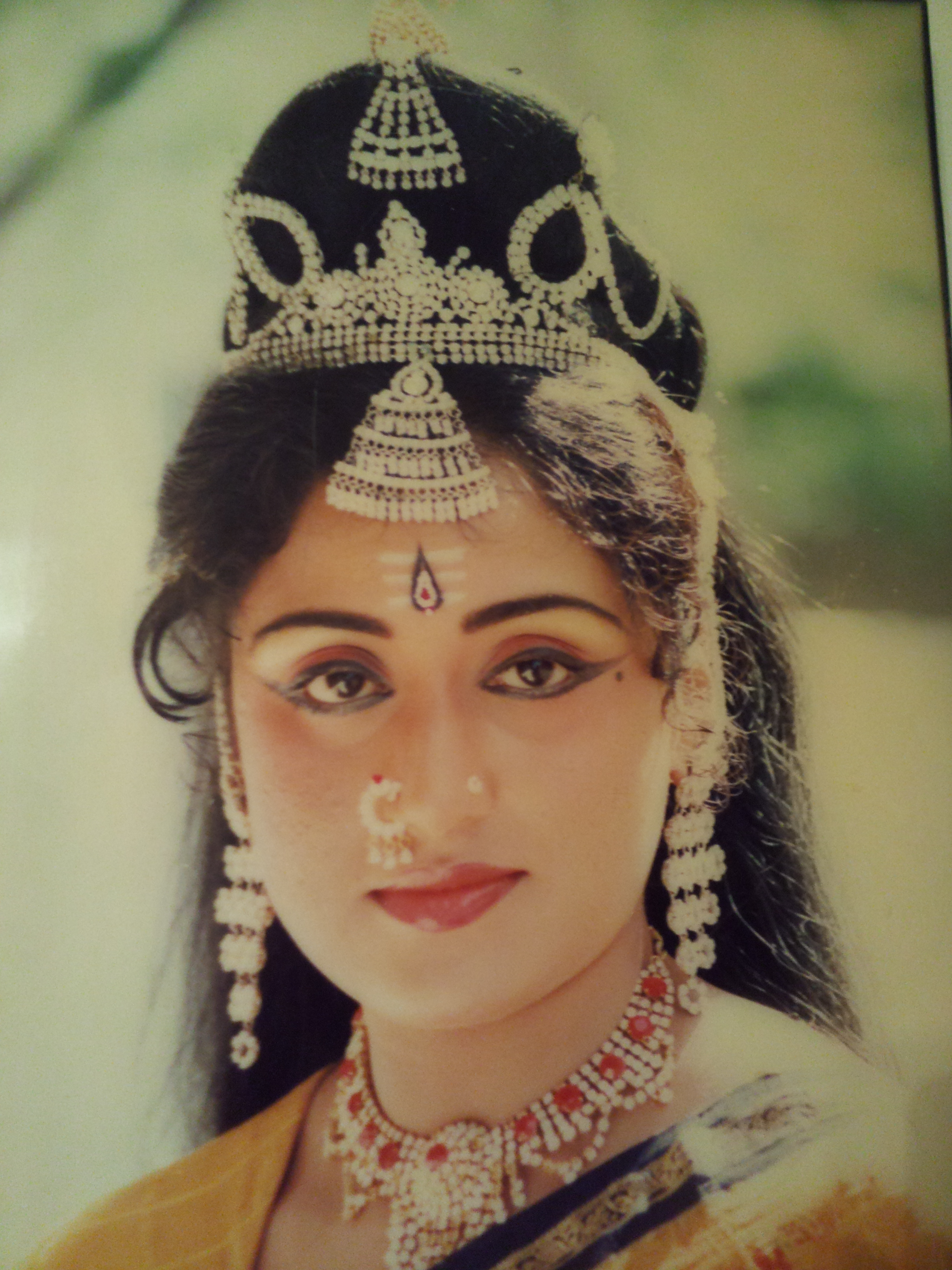
- Born: August 1956 (age 70); Tiruchirappalli, Tamil Nadu, India
- Occupation: Film Actress
- Years active: 1972–1990
- Spouse: Paul Schlacta (m.1993)
- Children: No Children
- Relatives: S. A. Ashokan (cousin); Vincent Asokan (nephew)

Prameela (T. A. Prameela) is a veteran Indian actress in South Indian films. She was a prominent lead actress during the 1970s and 1980s in Malayalam and Tamil films and also acted in a few Kannada and Telugu films. She was noted for her glamorous roles. She has acted more than 50 Malayalam movies. She made her debut through the 1968 Malayalam movie "Inspector". She got her major breakthrough in the 1973 Tamil film Arangetram. She is married to an American and settled in Los Angeles, California. She is a Roman Catholic and her mother tongue is Tamil.

== Personal life ==
She was born to Amal Das and Susheela as the second daughter among four children at Tiruchirappalli, Tamil Nadu. She has an elder brother Caesar, a younger sister, Sweety and a younger brother Prabhu. The family shifted to Chennai for her film career. She did her primary education at Sharada Vidyalaya, Chennai. She completed schooling in Holy redeemers girls high school, Trichy. She debuted at the age of 12 in the movie Inspector released in 1968. She acted around 250 movies in the four South Indian languages.

She is married to Paul Schlacta and settled in California. The couple has no children.

== Filmography ==
=== Tamil ===
1. Vazhaiyadi Vazhai (1972) – Debut in Tamil
2. Arangetram (1973) as Lalitha
3. Komatha En Kulamatha (1973)
4. Malligai Poo (1973)
5. Valli Dheivanai (1973)
6. Radha (1973)
7. Sondham (1973)
8. Manidharil Manikkam (1973)
9. Anbu Sagodharargal (1973)
10. Veetu Mappilai (1973)
11. Thanga Pathakkam (1974) as Jagan's wife
12. Thaai Paasam (1974)
13. Penn Ondru Kanden (1974)
14. Paruva Kaalam (1974)
15. Kai Niraya Kaasu (1974)
16. Piriya Vidai (1975)
17. Madhana Maaligai (1976)
18. Vayilla Poochi (1976)
19. Deviyin Thirumanam (1977)
20. Bala Paritchai (1977)
21. Punidha Anthoniyar (1977)
22. Unnai Suttrum Ulagam (1977)
23. Sadhurangam (1978)
24. Paavathin Sambalam (1978)
25. Thanga Rangan (1978)
26. Ullathil Kuzhanthaiyadi (1978)
27. Shri Kanchi Kamakshi (1978)
28. Makkal Kural (1978)
29. Kavari Maan (1979)
30. Devathai (1979)
31. Jaya Nee Jeichuttey (1979)
32. Vedhanai Thediya Maan (1980)
33. Ratha Paasam (1980)
34. 47 Natkal (1983)
35. Villiyanur Matha (1983)
36. Soorakottai Singakutti (1983)
37. Rajathanthiram (1984)
38. Pournami Alaigal (1985)
39. Ketti Melam (1985)
40. Naam (1985)
41. Iravu Pookkal (1986)
42. Kaalamellam Unn Madiyil (1986)
43. Jallikattu (1987)
44. Kavalan Avan Kovalan (1987)
45. En Thangai Kalyani (1988)
46. Athaimadi Methaiadi (1989)
47. Samsara Sangeetham (1989)
48. Muthalaliyamma (1990)

=== Malayalam ===
1. Niyamam Yenthu Cheyyum (1990)
2. Akkare Akkare Akkare (1990) as Krishnan nairs wife
3. Shesham Screenil (1990)
4. Kali karyamaai: Crime Branch (1989) as Nurse Leelamma
5. Abkari (1988)
6. Mangalya Charthu (1987) as Susheela
7. Pidikittappulli (1986)
8. Niramulla Raavukal (1986)
9. Oppam Oppathinoppam (1986) as Meenakshi
10. Janakeeya Kodathi (1985)
11. Puzhayozhukum Vazhi (1985) as Prameela
12. Ulppathi (1984)
13. Oru Nimisham Tharoo (1984)
14. Thacholi Thankappan (1984) as Janaki
15. Vetta (1984)
16. Sreekrishnaparunthu (1984)
17. Belt Mathai (1983) as Mary
18. Kattaruvi (1983) as Chellamma
19. Sooryan (1982)
20. Sphodanam (1981) as Narayanapilla's wife
21. Pathirasooryan (1981) as Ayisha
22. Aakramanam (1981)
23. Sambhavam (1981)
24. Ariyappedatha Rahasyam (1981) as Santha
25. Pinneyum Pookkunna Kaadu (1981)
26. Choothaattam(1981)
27. Lava (1980) as Janaki
28. Kari Puranda Jeevithangal (1980)
29. Ithikkara Pakki (1980)
30. Aswaradham (1980) as Sreedevi Kunjamma
31. Vedikkettu(1980)
32. Prakadanam (1980) as Ammu
33. Karimbana(1980) as madamma
34. Saraswatheeyaamam (1980)
35. Ottappettavar(1979)
36. Ormayil Nee Matram (1979)
37. Lillyppookkal (1979)
38. Raathrikal Ninakku Vendi (1979)
39. Kallu Karthyaayani (1979)
40. Paapathinu Maranamilla (1979)
41. Vaaleduthavan Vaalaal (1979)
42. Driver Madhyapichirunnu (1979)
43. Aaravam (1978)
44. Thampuraatti (1978) as Ragini Thampuratti
45. Kudumbam Namukku Sreekovil (1978) as Parvathi
46. Thaalappoli (1977)
47. Amme Anupame (1977)
48. Yatheem (1977) as Jameela
49. Makam Piranna Manka (1977)
50. Angeekaaram (1977) as Malini
51. Maanasaveena (1976)
52. Ullaasayaathra (1975)
53. Bhaaryaye Aavashyamundu (1975)
54. Jesus (1973)
55. Sambhavami Yuge Yuge (1972) as Manju
56. Line Bus (1971) as Priyamma
57. Marunnattil Oru Malayalai (1971) as Shoshamma
58. Madhuvidhu (1970)
59. Inspector (1968)

=== Telugu ===
1. Gandhi Puttina Desam (1973)
2. Nijam Cheppithe Nammaru (1973)
3. Jeevitha Rangamu (1974)
4. Inti Kodalu (1974)
5. Asthi Kosam (1975)
6. Abhimanavathi (1975)
7. 47 Rojulu (1981)
8. Palnati Puli (1984) as Parvathi
9. Driver Babu (1986)
10. Prema Samrat (1987)
11. Kaliyuga Rudrulu (1990)

=== Kannada ===
1. Anna Attige (1974)
2. Nagakanye (1975)
3. Thayigintha Devarilla (1977)
4. Parasangada Gendethimma (1978)
5. Daaha (1979)
6. Bhaktha Siriyala (1980)
7. Bhaktha Gnanadeva (1982)
8. Anveshane (1983)

== Television ==
- Vaishaka Sandhya – Malayalam serial
