= Chilanthivala =

- Directed by: Vijayanand
- Produced by: A. Raghunath
- Starring: M. N. Nambiar, Sreenath, K. P. Ummer, Captain Raju
- Music by: Guna Singh
- Production company: Sanjay Productions
- Distributed by: Sanjay Productions
- Release date: 26 February 1982
- Country: India
- Language: Malayalam

Chilanthivala (Spider Web) is a 1982 Indian Malayalam film, directed by Vijayanand and produced by A. Raghunath. The film stars M. N. Nambiar, Sreenath, K. P. Ummer and Captain Raju in the lead roles. The film has musical score by Guna Singh.

== Cast ==
- Sreenath as Suresh
- Captain Raju as Aravindan
- Manavalan Joseph as Paramu
- Kundara Johnny as Inspector Harris
- Meena as Mary
- K. P. Ummer as Menon
- Srividya as School teacher
- M. N. Nambiar as Sekharan
- Prathapachandran as Doctor Peter
- Roopa as Sarada
- Jagathy Sreekumar as Sayippu
- Vallathol Unnikrishnan as Shankar
- Thodupuzha Radhakrishnan as Thankappan
- Sudesh
- Stanley
- Rajesh
- Subhadra
- Anthikkadu Mani

== Soundtrack ==
The music was composed by Guna Singh and the lyrics were written by Poovachal Khader.

No.	Song	Singers	Lyrics	Length (m:ss)
1	"Engum Santhosham"	Vani Jairam, Chorus	Poovachal Khader	
2	"Good Morning"	P. Jayachandran, Vani Jairam	Poovachal Khader	
3	"Kaanchana Noopuram Kilungunnu"	P. Jayachandran	Poovachal Khader	
4	"Sindoorappottukal Thottu"	Vani Jairam	Poovachal Khader	
