= Bhavadhaarini =

Bhavadhaarini Anantaraman
- Born: 25 July 1980 (age 46)
- Origin: Thanjavur, Tamil Nadu, India
- Genre: Carnatic music - Indian Classical Music
- Occupation: Singer
- Years active: 1987 - Present
- Label: Swathi's Sanskriti Series

Bhavadhaarini Anantaraman (born 25 July 1980) is an Indian Carnatic musician. She is a senior disciple of D. K. Pattammal. Bhavadhaarini has performed in all major sabhas in India, as well as around the world. She has released more than 50 commercial albums in her career.

She received the Sivaji Birudhu in 2009 in recognition of her work in the field of Carnatic and devotional music.
