= A. B. Raj =

Indian film director (1929–2020)

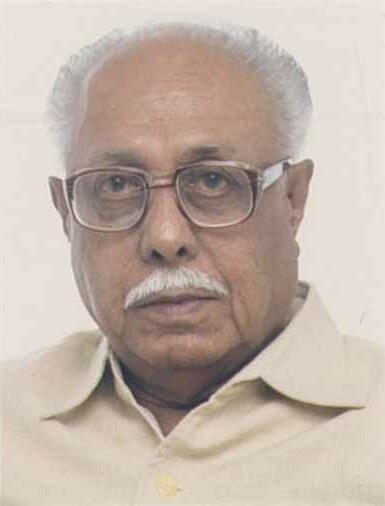
- Born: Antony Basker Raj; 1929; Madura, Presidency of Fort St. George, British India (present day Madurai, Tamil Nadu, India)
- Died: 23 August 2020 (aged 90); Chennai, Tamil Nadu, India
- Other name: A. Bhaskar Raj (in Sinhala cinema)
- Occupations: Director; Producer; Screenwriter
- Years active: 1951–1986
- Spouse: Sarojini
- Children: 3 (incl. Saranya Ponvannan)
- Parents: Bhagyanatha Pillai; Rajamma
- Relatives: Ponvannan (son-in-law)

Antony Basker Raj (1929 – 23 August 2020), also known as A. Bhaskar Raj, was an Indian director of Malayalam movies. He was, along with Sasikumar, one of the leading and most successful directors of the 1960s and 1970s. Some of the prominent later year directors like Hariharan, I.V. Sasi, P. Chandrakumar and Rajasekharan were trained by him as his assistants.

== Career ==
From 1951 to 1960, he directed ten Sinhala movies followed by 65 Malayalam movies from 1963 until 1984. He also directed two Tamil movies. His career included working as the Second Unit Assistant Director for The Bridge on the River Kwai (1957) by David Lean. His daughter Saranya Ponvannan is a leading actress in Tamil cinema.

== Death ==
He died on 23 August 2020 due to a heart attack at the age of 90.

== Filmography ==
Malayalam movies

- Ormikkan Omanikkan (1985)
- Manase Ninakku Mangalam (1984)
- Ningalil Oru Sthree (1984)
- Thaalam Thettiya Tharattu (1983)
- Aakrosam (1982)
- Kazhu Maram (1982)
- Adima Changala (1981)
- Agni Saram (1981)
- Vazhikal Yaathrakkar (1981)
- Kalam Kaathu Ninnilla (1979)
- Irumbazhikal (1979)
- Kazhukan (1979)
- Aana Kalari (1978)
- Avakaasham (1978)
- Kanal Kattakal (1978)
- Prarthana (1978)
- Raju Rahim (1978)
- Society Lady (1978)
- Aval Oru Devaalayam (1977)
- Bharya Vijayam (1977)
- Kaduvaye Pidicha Kiduva (1977)
- Chirikudukka (1976)
- Light House (1976)
- Prasadam (1976)
- Seemantha Puthran (1976)
- Ashthami Rohini (1975)
- Chief Guest (1975)
- Chumadu Darling (1975)
- Oomana Kunju (1975)
- Soorya Vamsam (1975)
- Tourist Bungalow (1975)
- Honeymoon (1974)
- Rahasyarathri (1974)
- Agnathavasam (1973)
- Football Champion (1973)
- Pacha Nottukal (1973)
- Sasthram Jayichu Manushyan Thottu (1973)
- Kalippava (1972)
- Nirthasala (1972)
- Sambhavami Yuge Yuge (1972)
- 'Marunnattil Oru Malayali' (1971)
- Neethi (1971)
- Ezhuthatha Katha (1970)
- Lottery Ticket (1970)
- Danger Biscuit (1969)
- Kannur Deluxe 1969)
- Kaliyalla Kalyanam (1968)

Tamil movies

- Thulli Odum Pullimaan (1971)
- Kai Niraya Kasu (1974)

Sinhala movies

- Prema Tharagaya (1953)
- Ahankara Sthree (1954)
- Perakadoru Bena (1955)
- Ramyalatha (1956)
- Sohoyuro (1958)
- Vana Mohini (1958)

== See also ==
- List of Malayalam films from 1971 to 1975
- List of Malayalam films from 1976 to 1980
- List of Malayalam films from 1981 to 1985
