= Puzhayozhukum Vazhi =

- Directed by: M. Krishnan Nair
- Written by: Joseph Kunnassery; J. C. George (dialogues)
- Screenplay by: J. C. George
- Produced by: Joly Paulson
- Starring: Venu Nagavally; Mammootty; Jagathy Sreekumar; Prameela
- Cinematography: Anandakuttan
- Edited by: MN Appu
- Music by: Raveendran
- Production company: Metro Movies
- Distributed by: Metro Movies
- Release date: 2 August 1985
- Country: India
- Language: Malayalam

Puzhayozhukum Vazhi is a 1985 Indian Malayalam film, directed by M. Krishnan Nair and produced by Joly Paulson. The film stars Venu Nagavally, Mammootty, Jagathy Sreekumar and Prameela in the lead roles. The film has a musical score by Raveendran.

== Plot ==
The movie starts with the intro of the college. Hari is a fan of poems and poets. He is also a poet. Rema is impressed with his voice and music, but she never says so directly. Even Hari too loved her. Meanwhile, Gopan tries his best to trap her, but she is not that type of girl. Gopan gets nervous when he sees her with Hari. He sets up plans to put a boundary in between them. Gopan challenges Hari that he will have her in his hotel room. He sets up a mimic and deceives Hari. Hari feels disappointed and starts to drink liquor. But later he understands the reality and apologizes to her. One day, Rema goes to see his friend's boyfriend to convey a message. Hari sees her and loses all his hope, because he knows about him. He skips from the affair and goes home. Gopan tries to molest her before the college days are over in his hotel room, but she escapes.

Then the story fast forwards about two years. Gopan has gone to the Gulf. He came back as a business hunk. Hari has refused all proposals because his mind is filled with Rema. Upon his mother's pressure, he goes and sees a girl. Accidentally that is Rema. Hari decides to marry her. Things change fast and Hari eventually forgets the past and they have a pretty good married life. Aravindan and family were his neighbor. When all is going fine, one day the dark knight comes into Rema's life again. It is Gopan. Rema is terribly worried as to what may happen to her life. So what may happen to Rema's life? Is Gopan still a rogue?

== Cast ==
- Venu Nagavally as Hari
- Mammootty as Gopan
- Jagathy Sreekumar
- Prameela
- Ambika as Rema
- Anuradha
- Lalu Alex as Aravindan

== Soundtrack ==
The music was composed by Raveendran and the lyrics were written by Rappal Sukumaramenon and Poovachal Khader.

No.	Song	Singers	Lyrics	Length (m:ss)
1	"Dhanumaasakkuliralakal"	K. J. Yesudas	Rappal Sukumara Menon	
2	"Kulirukal Pookkumee"	Anitha	Rappal Sukumara Menon	
3	"Manjin Mazhayil"	K. J. Yesudas, Kausalya	Poovachal Khader	
4	"Swaramandaakini Mohashathangalil"	K. J. Yesudas, Vani Jairam	Rappal Sukumara Menon	
5	"Swaramandakini Mohasathangalil" (Bit)	K. J. Yesudas	Rappal Sukumara Menon	
