= Prathapachandran =

Indian film actor

Prathapachandran Verma
- Born: 1941; Omallur, Pathanamthitta, Travancore
- Died: 16 December 2004 (age 63); Omallur, Pathanamthitta District, Kerala, India
- Occupation: Film actor
- Years active: 1962–2004
- Spouse: Chandrika
- Children: 3

Prathapachandran (1941–2004) was an Indian actor, who worked predominantly in Malayalam film industry, though he acted in a few Tamil and Telugu movies as well. He is known for the portrayal of villainous and character roles in over 300 movies. He was born in 1941 at Omallur in Thiruvithamkoor princely state, currently within the Pathanamthitta District, Kerala.

== Biography ==
Prathapachandran had to end his formal schooling by the 9th standard. He later moved to Kollam, and at the age of 14, he moved to Madras, hoping to be a movie actor. During his initial years, he failed to garner any significant movie roles; he lent his voice in radio plays and acted in plays organized by the Madras Malayali association. He got his first movie role in Viyarppinte Vila (1962), in which he acted as a man in his 70s. As he couldn't sustain the success, he returned to Kollam, and switched fulltime to theatre, working with Kalidasa Kalakendram. He could return to movies only in 1977, bagging a role in Jagadguru Aadisankaran. That kicked off a fresh career, and he went on to act in over 400 movies. His characters in films like Oru CBI Diary Kurippu, Manu Uncle, Kottayam Kunjachan, August 1 etc. were widely appreciated. Prathapachandran also produced a few Malayalam movies, including Manavadharmam, Prakadanam, Kodathi, Ivide Ingane, and Kattuthee, etc.

== Family ==
On 16 December 2004, Prathapachandran died after a massive cardiac arrest at his home. He was survived by his wife Chandrika and three children: Anoop, Deepak and Prathibha.

== Filmography ==
=== As an actor ===
==== Malayalam ====
===== 1960s =====
Year	Title	Role	Notes
1962	Viyarppinte Vila		
1964	Oral Koodi Kallanayi		
1964	School Master	Gopala Pilla	
1964	Kudumbini	Man at Carnival	
1964	Sree Guruvayoorappan		
1964	Bharthavu		
1965	Jeevithayaathra	Registrar	
1965	Chettathi	Gopi's friend	
1965	Daaham	Gopalan	
1965	Kavyamela	Prasadakan	
1966	Sthanarthi Saramma	Kuriachan	
1966	Tharavattamma	Suresh's friend	
1966	Kamadhenu	Shivaraman	
1966	Archana	Rajan's collegemate	
1966	Sthanarthi Saramma	Kuriachan	
1966	Kayamkulam Kochunni	Kallada Kochu Naanu	
1967	Cochin Express	Police constable	
1967	Madatharuvi		
1968	Vidyarthi		
1968	Padunna Puzha	Advocate	
1968	Dial 2244		

===== 1970s =====
Year	Title	Role	Notes
1975	Ayodhya	Ramdas	
1975	Chumaduthangi	Doctor	
1975	Hello Darling	Police Officer	
1975	Babumon		
1975	Utsavam	Contractor Cheriyan	
1975	Sooryavamsham		
1975	Thomasleeha		
1976	Amrithavaahini	Doctor	
1976	Aalinganam	Menon	
1976	Aayiram Janmangal		
1976	Kamadhenu		
1976	Themmadi Velappan		
1976	Ayalkkaari	Sathi's father	
1977	Oonjaal	Chathan	
1977	Anugraham	Principal	
1977	Jagadguru Aadisankaran	Vishnusharman/Sanandan	
1977	Nurayum Pathayum		
1977	Aparadhi	Jayachandran's father	
1977	Minimol		
1977	Angeekaaram	Shekharan Pilla	
1977	Samudram	Omana's father	
1977	Dweepu	Chandran's father	
1977	Mohavum Mukthiyum		
1977	Ammayi Amma		
1978	Madanolsavam	Dr. Radhakrishnan	
1978	Lisa	Madhava Menon	
1978	Randilonnu	Advocate	
1978	Madaalasa	Inspector	
1978	Jayikkaanaay Janichavan	Ananda Varma	
1978	Kanalkattakal	Kattumooppan	
1978	Thamburatti	Rema's father	
1978	Avalku Maranamilla		
1978	Sathrathil Oru Raathri		
1978	Paavaadakkaari		
1978	Adavukal Pathinettu	Jaya's father	
1978	Ahalya		
1978	Kaithappoo		
1978	Vayanadan Thamban		
1979	Angakkuri	Balagangadharan	
1979	Avano Atho Avalo	Narayanan	
1979	Sarpam	Ramesh's uncle	
1979	Aarattu		
1979	Kallu Karthyani		
1979	Pambaram		
1979	Raathrikal Ninakku Vendi		
1979	Maanavadharmam		
1979	Ottappettavar		
1979	Krishnapparunthu		

===== 1980s =====
Year	Title	Role	Notes
1980	Sakthi	Prathap	
1980	Ithikkara Pakky	Priest	
1980	Moorkhan	Forrest Officer	
1980	Love in Singapore	Krishnan Nair	
1980	Chandrahasam	Nanu	
1980	Manushya Mrugam		
1980	Angadi	Settu	
1980	Manjil Virinja Pookkal	Sivasankara Panikkar	
1980	Theenalangal	Father Mathew	
1980	Benz Vasu	Vasu's father	
1980	Prakadanam	Kattukallan	
1980	Rajaneegandhi	Vasu Menon	
1980	Pappu		
1980	Makara Vilakku		
1980	Sakthi	Prathap	
1981	Paathira Sooryan	Mathai	
1981	Abhinayam		
1981	Attimari	Prabhakaran	
1981	Ahimsa	Govindan	
1981	Kattukallan	Eshwara Pilla	
1981	Munnettam		
1982	Pooviriyum Pulari	Rajaram	
1982	Chilanthivala	Doctor Peter	
1982	Anuraagakkodathi	Minister Chandrsekharan	
1982	Ponnum Poovum	Pillai	
1982	Aarambham	Police officer	
1982	John Jaffer Janardhanan		
1982	Sree Ayyappanum Vavarum		
1982	Thuranna Jail	Habeeb	
1982	Saravarsham	Savitha's father	
1982	Ee Nadu	Minister Govindan	
1982	Innalenkil Nale		
1982	Aakrosham	Menon	
1982	Iththiri Neram Oththiri Kaaryam	Geejo's Father	
1982	Post Mortem	Esthappan	
1982	Jambulingam	Priest	
1983	Sandhyakku Virinja Poovu	Nambyar	
1983	Bhookambam	Ram Chand	
1983	Changatham	Balachandran	
1983	Himavaahini	Hema's father	
1983	Iniyengilum	Swamy	
1983	Maniyara	Singer at Ajmer	
1983	Oru Odai Nadhiyagirathu		
1983	Prathijnja	Moosakka	
1983	Aattakalasam	Indu's father	
1983	Thaalam Thettiya Tharattu	Judge	
1983	Aa Raathri	Advocate	
1983	Mansoru Maha Samudram		
1983	Himam	Madhavan	
1983	Swapnalokam		
1983	Angam	Dr. Rahman	
1983	Kolakomban		
1983	Nathi Muthal Nathi Vare	Sreedhara Menon	
1983	Bandham		
1983	Paalam		
1983	Ente Katha		
1984	Onnum Mindatha Bharya		
1984	Koottinilamkili	Menon	
1984	Piriyilla Naam	Prabhakaran Pillai	
1984	Kurishuyudham	Doctor	
1984	Unaroo		
1984	Mangalam Nerunnu		
1984	Sandhya Mayangum Neram	Varma	
1984	Chakkarayumma	Doctor	
1984	NH 47	Advocate	
1984	Kadamattathachan	Valiachan	
1984	Kodathy	Police Officer	
1984	Umaanilayam	Jagannatha Varma	
1984	Minimol Vathicanil	Mathew	
1984	Sandarbham		
1984	Muththodu Muthu	Sreenivasan	
1984	Uyarangalil	Fr. Stephen Chacko	
1984	Ivide Ingane	Mathew	
1985	Kandu Kandarinju	Sreedharan's father	
1985	Akkacheyude Kunjuvava		
1985	Udaya Geetham	Shankar	Tamil film
1985	Vellarikka Pattanam	Kuriakose	
1985	Vannu Kandu Keezhadakki		
1985	Azhiyatha Bandhangal	Achuthan Nair	
1985	Koodum Thedi	Mathaikutty	
1985	Nirakkoottu	Paul Mathew	
1985	Oru Kudakeezhil	Vijayalakshmi's father	
1985	Makan Ente Makan	Judge	
1985	Muhurtham Pathnonnu Muppathinu	The Priest	
1985	Ee Thalamura Ingane		
1985	Chorakku Chora	Rahman	
1985	Puzhayozhukum Vazhi		
1985	Choodatha Pookal		
1985	Ente Kaanakkuyil	Kumara Pilla	
1985	Kiraatham	Prathapan	
1985	Jeevante Jeevan	Nanu	
1985	Snehicha Kuttathinu	Krishna Pilla	
1986	Yuvajanotsavam	Sakhavu P.K	
1986	Rajavinte Makan	Raghavan	
1986	Niramulla Ravulkal		
1986	Naale Njangalude Vivaham	Divakaran Menon	
1986	Aavanazhi		
1986	Vikram	Police officer	Tamil film
1986	Snehamulla Simham	C. R.	
1986	Panchagni	Avarachan	
1987	Ithrayum Kaalam	Valiya Thirumeni	
1987	Vrutham	Nancy's father	
1987	Neeyallengil Njan	Shekhar	
1987	Irupatham Noottandu	CM Inchakadu Ramakrishna Pillai	
1987	Bhoomiyile Rajakkanmar	Rajashekharan	
1987	January Oru Orma	Fr. Fernandez	
1987	Oru Sindoora Pottinte Ormaykku	Fr. Xavier	
1987	Thaniyavarthanam	Balan's Father-in-Law	
1987	New Delhi	Jailor	
1987	Cheppu	Matthews	
1987	Vazhiyorakazchakal	Police Officer	
1987	Aids		
1987	Kaalathinte Shabdam	Krishna Menon	
1987	Neeyallengil Njan	Shekhar	
1988	Mrithyunjayam	Priest	
1988	Dhinarathrangal	Doctor	
1988	Abkari	Kaimal	
1988	Pattanapravesham	DySP. Ashoka Varma	
1988	Moonnam Mura	CM Bharathan Menon	
1988	Aranyakam	Nambiar	
1988	Vicharana	Govindan Nair	
1988	Manu Uncle	Ravunni	
1988	Bheekaran		
1988	Evidence	John Jacob	
1988	Sangham	Panicker	
1988	Oohakachavadam	Varma	
1988	Vida Parayan Mathrem		
1988	Thaala		
1988	Anuragi		
1988	August 1	Kazhuthumuttam Vasudevan Pillai	
1988	Oru CBI Diary Kurippu	Narayanan	
1989	Adikkurippu	Venkata Swamy	
1989	New Year	Menon	
1989	Mahayanam	Kochu Varkey	
1989	Adhipan	G. K.	
1989	My Dear Rosy		
1989	Ivalente Kamuki		
1989	Ancharakkulla Vandi	Sadananthan	
1989	Bhadrachitta		
1989	Douthyam	Colonel	
1989	Jagratha	Narayanan	
1989	The News	Viswanathan	
1989	Naduvazhikal	Panickar	

===== 1990s =====
Year	Title	Role	Notes
1990	Oliyampukal	Kariyachan	
1990	Sthreekku Vendi Sthree		
1990	Niyamam Enthucheyyum	Kaimal	
1990	Nammude Naadu	Prabhakara Panikkar	
1990	Malootty		
1990	Arhatha	Advocate	
1990	Kottayam Kunjachan	Kanjirappalli Pappachan	
1990	Varthamana Kalam		
1990	Ee Thanutha Veluppan Kalathu	C. K. Gopala Menon	
1990	Indrajaalam	Baburaj	
1990	Samrajyam		
1991	Aakasha Kottayile Sultan	Vishwanathan Nair	
1991	Orutharam Randutharam Moonnutharam	S Nambiar	
1991	Mimics Parade	Cheriyan	
1991	Oru Prathyeka Ariyippu	Minister	
1991	Nattuvishesham	Mathew	
1991	Ente Sooryaputhrikku	Shiva Prasad	
1991	Kadalora Kattu	Mamman George	
1991	Koodikazhcha	Thachampalli Divakara Panikkar	
1991	Raid	Jayan Panikkar	
1991	Thudar Katha	Adv. Thomas Mathew	
1992	Maanyanmar	K. R.	
1992	Avalariyathe		
1992	Ente Tuition Teacher		
1992	Soorya Chakram		
1992	Mahaan		
1992	Rishi		
1992	Priyapetta Kukku		
1992	Mayangunna Manasukal		
1992	Naadody	Ninan Varghese	
1992	Mahanagaram	Chief Minister C.R.K.	
1992	Kizhakkan Pathrose	Settu	
1993	Paalayam	Adv. Krishnakumar	
1993	Aacharyan		
1993	Jackpot	Ruby Devaraj	
1993	Uppukandam Brothers	Chandikunju	
1993	Mafia	Commissioner Warrier	
1993	Sthreedhanam		
1993	Customs Diary	Customs Officer	
1994	Rajadhani	Chief Minister	
1994	Kambolam	Subramaniya Iyyer	
1994	Gandeevam		
1994	Chief Minister K. R. Gowthami	Kolakkattu Raghavan	
1995	Mannar Mathai Speaking	Dr. Unnithan	
1995	Sindoora Rekha	Dr. Kanaran	
1995	Vrudhanmare Sookshikkuka	Police Officer	
1996	April 19		
1996	Aayiram Naavulla Ananthan	Sridevi's father	
1997	Oru Mutham Manimutham		
1997	Masmaram	Justice Ramanathan	
1999	Inalakal Ilathe	Tony's father	
1999	Red Indians	Dr. Madhavadas	

===== 2000s =====
Year	Title	Role	Notes
2000	Nisheedhini		
2000	Summer Palace		
2000	Indriyam		
2001	Yamini	Ouseppachan	
2001	Romance		
2001	Sagara		
2001	Malaramban		
2001	Layathaalangal		
2001	Maami		
2001	Premagni		
2001	Chaarasundari		
2001	Swathithampuratti		
2001	Agnipushpam		
2001	Aa Oru Nimisham		
2001	Aalilathoni		
2002	Vanibham		
2002	Niramulla Swapnagal		
2002	Asurayugam		
2002	Nee Enikkai Mathrem	Raghavan	
2002	Sisiram		
2002	Dian		
2003	Veendum Thulabharam		
2003	Janakeeyam	Prathapan	
2004	Thirichu Varavu		

==== Tamil ====
Year	Title	Role	Notes
1980	Varumayin Niram Sivappu	Pratap's father	
1983	Thudikkum Karangal	Church father	
1983	Oru Odai Nadhiyagirathu		
1983	Kai Varisai		
1985	Udaya Geetham	Shankar	
1986	Vikram	Police officer	
1986	Kulirkaala Megangal		
1987	Arul Tharum Ayyappan		
1987	Nayakan		
1989	Mounam Sammadham	Sessions Court Judge Srinivasan	
1990	Nadigan	Vishwanathan	
1991	Karpoora Mullai	Shiva Prasad	
1991	Nanbargal	Priya's father	
1991	Thanga Thamaraigal		
1991	Pudhiya Raagam	Raghuraman's father	
1992	Mannan	Raghavan	
1992	Pandian	Police Officer	
1993	Walter Vetrivel		
1993	Madurai Meenakshi	Judge	
1993	Uzhaippali	Doctor	
1997	Rettai Jadai Vayasu		
1997	Kadhal Palli		
1998	Kumbakonam Gopalu		
1999	Malabar Police		
1999	Suryodayam	Chief Minister	
1999	Jayam	IG of Kerala Police	

==== Telugu ====
Year	Title	Role	Notes
1981	Patalam Pandu		
1981	Aakali Rajyam	Pratap's father	
1991	Peddintalludu	Viswanatham	

==== Hindi ====
Year	Title	Role	Notes
1988	New Delhi	Maria Fernandes' father	

=== Produced films ===
- Manavadharmam (1979)
- Prakadanam (1980)
- Ivide Ingane (1984)
- Kodathi (1984)
- Kaattuthee (1985)

=== Story ===
- Kodathy (1984)
- Ee Thalamura Ingana (1985)

=== Dubbing Artist ===
- Chandrabimbam-Voice for M. N. Nambiar
- Devasuram-Voice for Delhi Ganesh

=== Television ===
- Deepam (Doordarshan) (direction, production)
- Kadamattathu Kathanar (Asianet)
- Vizhuthugal
