= Pala Thankam =

Indian actress (1941–2021)

- Born: 1941; Pala, India
- Died: 10 January 2021 (aged 79)
- Occupation: Film actress
- Years active: 1969–1981
- Spouse: Sreedharan Thampi
- Children: Somasekharan Thampi, Bahuleyan Thampi, Ambili

Pala Thankam (1941 – 10 January 2021) was an Indian actress in Malayalam movies. She was one of the prominent supporting actresses, singers and dubbing artists in the late 1960s and 1970s in Malayalam and Tamil movies. She acted in more than 100 movies and dubbed for almost 500 films.

== Biography ==
She was born as Thankam at Pala, Kottayam. Before becoming a film actress, she worked as a theater artist with many drama troupes such as KPAC, Vishwakerala kala Samithi, Jyothi Theaters etc. She made her film debut in the 1963 movie Rebecca as Sathyan's mother. She made her dubbing debut in the 1971 movie, Bobanum Moliyum for the character Boban. She was a sought out dubbing artist during the 1970s who has dubbed for more than 1000 characters and acted in more than 300 movies. She has dubbed for 5 characters in a single movie.

== Personal life ==
Her husband, Sreedharan Thampi, was a police officer, who died in an accident. The couple have three children: Somasekharan Thampi, Bahuleyan Thampi, Ambili. Her daughter Ambili was also a dubbing artist in Malayalam movies. She was deserted by her children and stayed at an aged care facility, Gandhibhavan, at Kollam.

== Partial filmography ==
- Kinar (2018)
- Muthukudayum Choodi (1989)
- Abkari (1988)
- Jaithra Yathra (1981)
- Jambulingam (1982)
- Innalenkil Nale (1982)
- Abhinayam (1981)
- Chandrahaasam (1980)
- Pavizha Muththu (1980) as Kalyani
- Prakadanam (1980) as Hostel warden
- Lovely (1979)
- Kaalam Kathu Ninnilla (1979)
- Balapareekshanam (1978)
- Aanakkalari (1978)
- Ninakku Njaanum Enikku Neeyum (1978)
- Beena (1978)
- Aniyara (1978)
- Anubhoothikalude Nimisham (1978)
- Padakuthira (1978)
- Ashtamudikkayal (1978)
- Chakrayudham (1978)
- Randu Penkuttikal (1978)
- Anugraham (1977) as School teacher
- Jagadguru Aadisankaran (1977)
- Aparaajitha (1977)
- Yatheem (1977)
- Nirakudam (1977)
- Anjali (1977)
- Ormakal Marikkumo (1977) as Chellamma
- Minimol (1977)
- Sreedevi (1977)
- Aadhya Paadam (1977)
- Niraparayum Nilavilakkum (1977)
- Ponni (1976)
- Abhimaanam (1975)
- Mattoru Seetha (1975)
- Nathoon (1975)
- Rahasyaraathri (1974)
- Kanyakumari (1974)
- Thumbolarcha (1974) as Paanathi
- Chanchala (1974)
- Driksakshi (1973) as Paruamma
- Kaliyugam (1973) as Keshu's mother
- Thekkankattu (1973) as Saramma
- Azhakulla Saleena (1973)
- Eanippadikal (1973)
- Udayam (1973)
- Interview (1973) as Susheela's mother
- Poymukhangal (1973)
- Panimudakku (1972)
- Maravil Thirivu Sookshikkuka (1972) as Jayadevan's mother
- Akkarapacha (1972)
- Theertha Yathra (1972)
- Aaradi Manninte Janmi (1972) as Murali's mother
- Gandharvakshetram (1972) as Nurse
- Nrithasaala (1972)
- Taxi Car (1972)
- Ganga Sangamam (1971) as Theyyaamma
- Aabhijathyam (1971)
- Achante Bharya (1971)
- Marunaattil Oru Malayaali (1971)
- Thurakkatha Vathil (1971)
- Anubhavangal Paalichakal (1971)
- Kallichellamma (1969)
- Rebecca (1963) as Mariya
- Kadalamma (1963)
- Kedavilakku

== Dubbing ==
- Seetha (1960) for Kushalakumari
- Siksha (1971) for Sadhana
- Bobanum Moliyum (film) for Master Sekhar
- Lisa (1978) for Bhavani
- Aarohanam (1980)
- Oru Madapravinte Katha (1983)
- Krishna Guruvaayoorappa (1984) for Shalini (Baby Shalini)
- Itha Innu Muthal (1984)
- Eeran Sandhya (1985)
- Mounanombaram (1985)
- Archana Aradhana (1985)
- Puzhayozhukum Vazhi (1985)
- Katturumbinu Kathukuthu (1986)
- Kaveri (1986)
- Akalangalil (1986)
- Janmandharam (1988)
- Thoranam (1988)
- Bheekaran (1988)
- Rugmini (1989)
- Naale Ennonnundenkil (1990)
- Kadalorakkattu (1991)
- Chenkol (1993)
- Bhoomigeetham (1993)

== TV Serial ==
- Innaleyude Aalkkar {Doordarshan}

== Dramas ==
- Moulikavakasham
- Ningalenne Communistakki
- Surveykkallu
- Mooladhanam

== As a Singer ==
- Kedavilakku
