= Cheri Viswanath =

Indian writer and journalist

- Born: 9 August 1933; Kollam, Kollam District, British India
- Died: 9 September 2014 (aged 81)
- Occupations: Screenwriter, journalist, lyricist, novelist
- Spouse: S.Radhamani Amma (late)
- Writing career
- Pen name: Cheri
- Subject: Social Aspects
- Literary movement: Realism

Cheri Viswanath (9 August 1933 – 9 September 2014) was a South Indian screenwriter, playwright, lyricist and journalist.

== Biography ==
Many of his works were written under the pen name Cheri, which is derived from the name of his family Cheriyil in Kollam District in South India.

He started his career as a playwright and journalist and was associated with the famous theatre group in South India called Kalanilayam.

In a literary career spanning over 45 years, he had written 16 novels, 25 dramas and 19 radio plays and several lyrics for Malayalam movies.

His song for the movie Thaalappoly (1977) was the biggest hit of the year.

He had written screenplays for 20 feature films, directed by veteran film makers M.Krishnan Nair, Madhu, Crossbelt Mani and M.Mani.

Viswanath worked as the Chief Editor for the Malayalam Dailies Thaniniram and Yeenadu for 45 years.

He is the father of award-winning international film maker Biju Viswanath and Priya Prakash, Veena Player.

== Major works ==
=== Plays ===
Name	Theatre Group	Year
Pattukari	Kollam Theatres	1962
Anarkali	Grihari Theatres	1963
Bhagat Singh	Grihari Theatres	1965
Pazhassiraja	Amrita theatres	1967
Police	Kayamkulam Peoples Theaters	1970
Dharmasupatri	Kayamkulam Peoples Theaters	1971
Pashupatastram	Adoor Pankajam's Jaya Theaters	1972
Penal code	Adoor Bhavani Theatres	1973
Sreekrishavatram(Opera)	Pappanacode Mani	1973
Parithranaya	Adoor Pankajam's Jaya Theaters	1974
Naradan Keralathil	Kalanilayam Dramascope	1977
Ragam Thanam Pallavi	Kalanilayam Drama scope	1978
Sreekrishna Avataram	| Indian drama scope	1980

=== Screenplays ===
Movie	Director	Year
Neelasari	M.Krishnan Nair	1976
Dheere Sameere Yamuna Theere	Madhu	1976
Thaalappoly	M.Krishnan Nair	1977
Rowdy Ramu	M.Krishnan Nair	1978
Koumara Praayam	Gopalkrishna	1979
Eettappuli	Mani	1983
Thimingalam	Mani	1983
Bullet	Mani	1984
Ottayan	Mani	1985
Pacha Velicham	M.Mani	1985
Revenge	Mani	1986
Chorakku Chora	Mani	1986
Black Mail	Mani	1987
Urukku Manushyan	Mani	1987
Niramulla	N.Shankaran Nair	1987
Kulambadikal	Mani	1988
Cabaret Dancer	N.Shankaran Nair	1988
Penn Simham	Mani	1988
Naradhan Keralathil	Mani	1989
Commander	Mani	1990

=== Radioplays ===
- Ezhu Sundara Rathrikal 1979 (Seven Wonderful Nights)
- Sasthram Prathikuttil 1980 (Science in the Accused Stand)
- Porutham 1980 (Harmony)
- Tharavadinte Manam 1981 (Family Honour)
- Siksha 1981 (Punishment)
- Punarvivaham 1983 (Remarriage)
- Nandi Veendum Varilla 1986 (Thanks I Won't Come Again)
- Doctor, Collector, Engineer 1986
- Packup 1992

=== Kadhaprasangam ===
- Neelasari (Blue Sari) 1969 (Kollam Babu)
- Marble Sundari (Marble Beauty) 1971 (Kundara Soman)
- Swayamvaram (Marriage) 1972 (Kundara Soman)
- Punarjanmam (Rebirth) 1973(Kundara Soman)
- Christ 1975 (Chenganoor Thankachan)
- Neelavelicham (Blue Light) 1976 (Viswambharam)
- Devatha (Goddess) 1977 (Chitaranjan Bhagavatar)

=== Novels ===
- Avivahithayaya Bharya 1962 (Unmarried Wife)
- Ladies Hostel 1963
- Snehabandam 1965 (Love Affair)
- Vivahasammanam 1966 (Wedding Gift)
- Kamadhenu 1967 (Wish Cow)
- Kanaljalam 1968 (Mirage)
- Randam Madhuvidhu 1970 (Second Honey Moon)
- Daivam Veetil Vannirunnu 1971 (God Came to House)
- Neelasari 1972 (Blue Sari)
- Melottu ozhukumma Puzha 1985 (The River That Flows Upwards)
