= V. Dakshinamoorthy =

Dakshinamoorthy
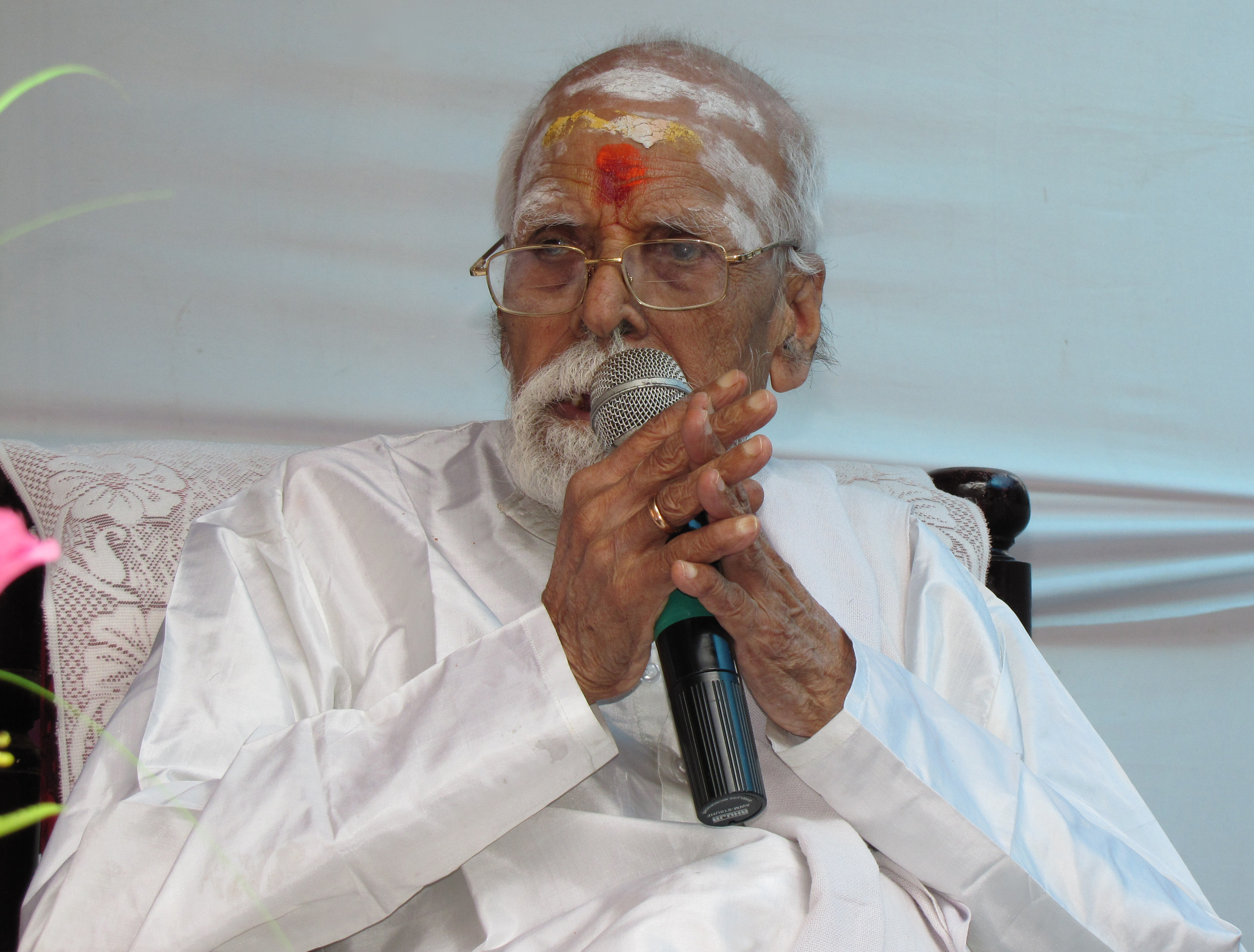

Background information
- Also known as: Swamy
- Born: Venkateswaran Dakshinamoorthy Iyer; 9 December 1919; Haripad, Quilon, Travancore (Present-day Alappuzha district, Kerala)
- Origin: Alappuzha, Kerala, India
- Died: 2 August 2013 (aged 93) Chennai, Tamil Nadu, India
- Genre: Carnatic music
- Occupation: Musician
- Instruments: Harmonium, Vocal
- Years active: 1950 – 2013

Venkateswaran Dakshinamoorthy (9 December 1919 – 2 August 2013) was a veteran Carnatic musician and composer and music director of Malayalam, Tamil and Hindi films. His predominantly worked in Malayalam cinema.

He set scores for the songs in over 125 films, and composed as many as 1400 songs over a period of 63 years. Fondly known as Swami, he was instrumental in pioneering classical music-based film songs. Revered as one of the forefathers of the Malayalam music industry, he mentored many of the renowned contemporary singers and composers including P. Leela and K. J. Yesudas.

In 1998, he was honoured with the J. C. Daniel Award, Kerala government's highest honour for his contributions to Malayalam cinema.

== Biography ==
Dakshinamoorthy was born in a Tamil Brahmin family on 9 December 1919 as Venkateswaran Dakshinamoorthy Iyer, to Parvathiammal and D. Venkateswara Iyer a Bank Officer, at Mullakkal in Quilon, Travancore (Present-day Alappuzha district, Kerala). He was the eldest among the seven children of his parents, whom he funnily described as 'those like seven notes'. He had two brothers and four sisters. His interest in music was nurtured by his mother, who taught him keerthanas of Thyagaraja Swamikal when he was still a child. He had grasped at least 27 songs just by hearing them when they were being rendered by his mother and sister. When he was ten years old, Venkatachalam Potti in Thiruvananthapuram taught him Carnatic music and the tutelage continued for three years. His first public performance was when he was 13 years old, at the Ambalapuzha Sri Krishna temple. It was his habit to offer prayers to "Vaikkathappa Annadhaana Prabho" or Lord Shiva daily, in the morning, and before going to bed. His primary schooling was in Sanaathana Dharma Vidyashaala, Alappuzha, till the 5th standard. He continued in Kiliparam School. He completed his HSC at Shri Moola Vilasa High School, Thiruvananthapuram, and then he decided that music had to be his future. After finishing S.S.L.C., he learned carnatic music from Venkatachalam Potty in Thiruvananthapuram. Swami came to Vaikom at the age of 16, practiced and taught music. During that period when he was 20-22, he received "The Nirmaalya Darshan" of Vaikathappan for three and a half years continuously. This feat played a big part in his route to greatness.

=== The Marriage at Vaikom ===
There is an incident that happened in Ambalapuzha. One midnight as Ambalapuzha was lashed by torrential rain, Ganjira Vidwan Kaduva Krishnan knocked at the doors of Dakshinamoorthy's house, inviting him to perform at a marriage Katcheri at Vaikkom the next day. His mother permitted him to do so and the two walked up to the Karumaadi boat jetty at Ambalapuzha and reached Vaikkom the next morning, 8 a.m. After having a bath and a good darshan of Vaikkathappa's, they reached Kaidarathu Madam for the concert. At the request of Kochi-based Konkini Tavil Vidwan to teach music to his relatives, Dakshinamoorthy remained at Vaikkom. He stayed there for 42 months and during this stay, he would sing daily at the temple, attend Nirmalya Darsanam and sing on all Ashtamis at the temple.

=== Music career ===
==== Entry into film industry ====
In 1948, he came to Chennai with his parents. He married Shrimathi Kalyani on 28 January 1948. He entered the film world in 1948. He debuted in the film industry in 1950 with Nalla Thanka, produced by Kunchacko and K. V. Koshy under the banner of K & K Productions. The hero of the film was Augustin Joseph, a well-known stage actor and singer, who was also the father of the renowned singer K. J. Yesudas. The film also had songs sung by Augustine Joseph. The producers wanted Dakshinamoorthy to compose a song on Lord Vinayaka and that was the first song he began his film industry career with. He also composed music for "The Opera" at Kalamandalam during the same period, where he graced through 8 Operas and 30 dance dramas.

==== Film career ====
Dakshinamoorthy went on to set scores for K. J. Yesudas, his son Vijay Yesudas (for the film Idanazhiyil Oru Kalocha, directed by Bhadran) and his granddaughter Ameya (for the film Shyama Raagam, awaiting release) as well, thus achieving a rare treat.

He set the scores for many songs written by Sreekumaran Thampi and Abhayadev, forming a famous musician-songwriter duo like the Vayalar Ramavarma – G. Devarajan and P. Bhaskaran – Baburaj duos. He had R. K. Shekhar, father of the music director A. R. Rahman as his assistant for a few films, who later became a musician in his own right. He went on to direct music for over 125 films including Navalokam, Seetha, Viyarppinte Vila, Sri Guruvayoorappan, Kadamattathachan and Indulekha.

His evergreen compositions include Swapnangal... Swapnangale ningal...(Kavyamela), Pattu padiyurakkam njan...(Seetha), Uthara swayamvaram...(Danger Biscuit), Kattile pazhmulam...(Vilaykku Vangiya Veena), Hrudaya Saraslie, Chandrikayil, Kattile Pazhmulam, Manohari Nin, Sowgandhigangale, Aakashamand Vathil pazhuthilooden...(Idanazhiyil Oru Kalocha).

He was guru of many singers and Music Directors including P. Leela, P. Susheela, Kalyani Menon and Ilaiyaraaja. In 1971 he won the Kerala State Film Award for Best Music Director.

The duo of Swami and Srikumaran Thambi contributed countless chart-toppers to the Malayalam Film Industry. In 2003, he received the coveted 'Sangeetha Saraswathi' Award from the hands of revered Poojya Sri Guruji Viswanath of Manava Seva Kendra, Bangalore. In the year 2008, he composed four songs for the Malayalam movie Mizhikal Sakshi.

Even at the age of 93, his endeavors towards music had not slowed down. He was working on a movie project, "Shyama Raagam", rendering music for the same.

=== Performances ===
His first trip to Madras was in 1942, when he was to sing in a 30-minute programme on AIR. He was a regular visitor to the AIR for the next 4 years after which he settled in Mylapore in 1948. Between 1942 and 1957, he performed around 500 carnatic concerts in Kerala. He has also performed at international venues such as the Dubai Dala Festival in Dubai, Bahrain, Abu Dhabi and Kuwait. "Dakshinamurthy Sangeetha Utsavam" has been taking place every year since 2013 at Perungotukara.

=== Disciples ===
His disciples included talented singers like N.C. Vasantakokilam, Kaviyoor Revamma, Kalyani Menon, Ambili, Mithun, Srilatha, Shereen Peters, Bhavadhaarini, Mithun Jayaraj etc.

=== Singers and composers ===
Generations of singers have sung under the Bheeshmacharya of Indian Music, including P. Leela, Kamukara Purushothaman, Balamurali Krishna, K.J.Yesudas, P.B. Srinivas, Ghantashaala, T.M.S., S.P.B., Augustin Joseph, Jeyachandran, A.M. Raja, Vijay Yesudas and his daughters, M.L.V, P. Susheela, S. Janaki, L.R. Eashwari, Madhuri, Ambili, Kalyani Menon, K.S. Chitra, Vaani Jeyaram, Sujatha, Madhubala Krishnan, Unni Krishnan, Krishnaraj, Minmini, Swetha, Unni Menon, M.G. Sreekumar, Jolly Abraham, Biju Narayanan, and Manjari.

Ilaiyaraaja, R. K. Shekhar (father of A.R. Rahman) and many more composers have been assistants in Swami's music recording sessions.

=== Introductions ===
Dakshinamoorthy is to be highly credited for his introduction of P. Suseela to Malayalam cinema through 'Seetha'. The song 'Pattu Paadi Urakkam' sung by P. Suseela in that film is still popular in Kerala. He also introduced other singers such as Ambili, K.P. Brahmanandham, Shereen Peters, Vinodhini, Sree Latha, Kalyani Menon, etc.

=== Books ===
He has written three books namely Thiagabrahmam (Tamil – 1965), Aathma Dheepam (Tamil – 1989) and Sathya Mithram (Malayalam – 1992).

His private masterpieces bearing 108 of his own compositions (Keerthanas) were released as a book during his first death anniversary at Makreri Temple, Kerala with the name "Raagaabharanam" honoring his priceless contribution to the field of music.

=== Pious nature ===
A devout Hindu throughout his life, Dakshinamoorthy started his speeches telling Sarvacharacharangalkkum Namaskaram, Charachara Guruvinum Namaskaram (Welcome to all the living and non-living creatures in the world, and also to their teacher). He was a devotee of Lord Shiva of Vaikom Temple in Kottayam district, after whom he was named, (Note: Dakshinamurthy is a form of Lord Shiva worshipped in the form of a teacher.) and he celebrated his 60th, 70th, 80th and 90th birthdays by offering Sahasrakalasham at Vaikom Temple. He was also a devotee of Lord Guruvayurappan, and used to visit Guruvayur temple too. Being a Brahmin, he was a vegetarian as he adhered to the traditional diet. He offered his wooden model of the Sabarimala Temple inside which he worshipped his revered idols to the Subrahmanya-Hanuman temple at Makreri in Kannur district. The Saraswathi Mandapam is now a home ground bearing all the crowning jewels of his lifetime achievement in the form of Awards and Trophies. The Thiagaraaja Akandam started at Makreri Ambalam and has been taking place for more than 12 years.

== Awards ==
- 2019 – Kerala State Film Award – Special Mention (posthumously) – Shyamaragam (Music director)
- 2013 – Swathi Sangeetha Puraskaram – Government of Kerala
- 2010 – Ramashramam Unneerikutty Award
- 2010 – Honorary Doctorate by Mahatma Gandhi University
- 2010 – Lifetime Achievement Award – Mirchi
- 2008 – Amrita TV Award
- 2007 – Swaralaya Yesudas Award for lifetime contributions to Malayalam film music
- 2003 - Abhaya Dev Award 2003 for outstanding contribution for Indian Music
- 2000 - "Kalakairali Award 1998-99" for Human integration
- 1998 – J. C. Daniel Award from the Government of Kerala
- 1998 - Golden Jubilee Award from Film Fans Association, Madras
- 1997 - The First "Kamukara Award’" presented by Vice-President Shri K.R. Narayanan
- 1997 - Vayalar Memorial Cultural Award 1997" by Kala Kairali and Vayalar Memorial Cultural Award Academy
- 1990 - Cine Technicians’ Platinum Jubilee of Indian Cinema 1913-1988 for outstanding contributions to Cinema
- 1990 - The Prestigious Cinema Technicians Association of South India, Ramnath Award
- 1990 - Madras Kerala Samajam Award
- 1982 - Kerala Sangeetha Nataka Akademi Fellowship
- 1981 - Indian Talkies Golden Jubilee Award & Gold Medal" for 50 Years of dedicated service in Indian Cinema, from the President of India, Shri. Neelam Sanjeeva Reddy
- 1971 – Kerala State Film Award for Best Music Director for Vilakku Vangiya Veena, Marunnattil Oru Malayali and Muthassi
- 1965, 1966, 1967, 1968, 1969 - Film Fans Association Award
- 1961 - Kerala Sangeetha Nataka Academy Award

== Titles ==
#	Year	Title	By
1	1971	GANAMRITHAM	Travancore Devaswom Board
2	1991	ATMA NJANA VITHAGAR	Agastyar Foundation, Madras
3	1993	OUTSTANDING CITIZEN	Madras Junior Champ
4	1994	VETERAN MUSICAL CREATIVE PEOPLE	Mr. Naushad Ali on the Silver Jubilee Celebrations of Indian Performing Rights Society, Bombay
5	1994	SANGEETHASEVA	Rajarajeswari Sabha for outstanding works in Classical Music.
6	2001	MALAYALATHINU VARADANAMAI LABICHA SARGAPATHI	Asianet Cable Vision
7	2001	GANACHARYA	Nadopasana
8	2002	GANARATHNAKARAM	Malliyur Adhyatmilapeedam
9	2002	GURO DAKSHINAMURTHY	Pookad Kalakendram
10	2002	SANGEETHA RATHNA	Sruthibaratha Academy of Fine Arts
11	2002	SANGEETHA ARCHARYA	BEAS Quilon
12	2002	GAYAKA RATHNAM	Shri Padbanabadasa Uthradom Thirunal Marthanda Varma, Maharaja of Travancore
13	2002	SANGEETHA SARASWATHI	Guruji Viswanath, Bangalore
14	2003	SANGEETHA BHARATHI	Outstanding contributions rendered to Malayalam Film Music as well as Classical Music by the School of Music, Palakkad
15	2006	AGNIHOTHRI	Pallippuram Kodikunnathe Bhagavathi Kshethra puraskaram
16	2007	SANGEETHA VIGYANA NIDHI	Thalipparambu "Sri Rajarajeswara" kshetra conferred the title with Pattum Valayum
17	2007	SANGEETHA PARAMACHARYA	Adi Sankara Veda Vedantha Samskritha Cooperative Educational Society
18	2010	DOCTOR	Mahatma Gandhi University, Kerala

== Honours ==
#	Year	Honour
1	1995	Music Family of Kerala for outstanding contributions to Malayalam Cinema for 50 years, in connection with the programme Malayalam Films Yesterday - Today - Tomorrow
2	1995	Malayalam Cine Technicians Association (MACTA) honorary membership
3	1996	Sangeetha Sangamam memento encrypting ‘Pranams" to Dakshinamurthy
4	2001	Calicut University
5	2001	Kairali by giving "Pranamam"
6	2002	Travancore Devaswaom Board honoured at the function "Pambasangamam 2002"
7	2002	Artists Save Association (ASA)
8	2002	Kannur University
9	2003	Bharatham
10	2003	Quilon Jilla Panchayath
11	2003	Perasseri Brothers Arts Club
12	2003	Sharada Vidyapeetom Kodumbu
13	2003	Sharkala Govinda Marar Samithi
14	2003	Nemmara Illustrious Lovers of Arts 2003
15	2003	Perumbavoor Municipal Council during their Golden Jubilee Celebrations
16	2003	Memento "150 Golden Years" by Chief Divisional Commercial Manager, Southern Railways, Palakkad
17	2003	Mangala Pathram by Shri Perunna Subramania Swamy Devaswom, Changanachery
18	2003	Memento by Employees of the Government of India Press

== Death ==
Despite his advanced age and failing health, Dakshinamoorthy continued to work in the musical field and composed songs for many albums. In July 2013, he made his last achievement as a composer, giving songs for four generations in a single family. This happened through giving a chance to Ameya Vijay, the daughter of Vijay Yesudas and granddaughter of K. J. Yesudas. Dakshinamoorthy gave songs to Yesudas' father Augustine Joseph, a veteran drama actor and singer, in his very first film in 1950. He later used Yesudas to sing most of his songs. He also introduced Vijay Yesudas in 1987 through a sloka in the film 'Idanazhiyil Oru Kalocha'.

Dakshinamoorthy died at his home in Chennai at 6:30 PM on 2 August 2013, at the age of 93. He died peacefully in his sleep, which is considered auspicious for Hindus. His death was also on an Ekadashi day, which is also considered auspicious. He had plans to visit his daughter's home nearby along with his wife, and when he heard that the driver of the taxi in which he was to go would be late, he went to sleep. When the car arrived, his wife wondered why her husband was not ready. Then she went to call her husband, who did not respond. Death was confirmed soon, citing a cardiac arrest as the possible cause of death.

Dakshinamoorthy was cremated with full state honors at Besant Nagar electric crematorium. Thousands of famous people attended his funeral. The then Kerala State Cultural Minister K. C. Joseph represented the Kerala state. He is survived by his three children - two daughters and a son. Kalyani Ammal, his wife of 65 years, died on 22 October 2021, aged 91.
