= Vincent (actor) =

Indian actor

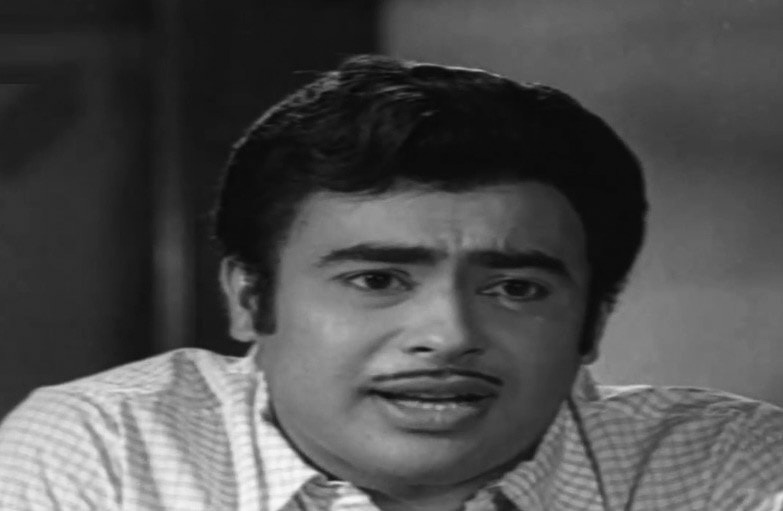
- Born: 12 February 1946; Edavanakad, Ernakulam
- Died: 30 August 1991 (aged 44–45); Madras, Tamil Nadu, India
- Occupation: Actor
- Years active: 1969-1991
- Spouse: Mary Vincent
- Children: Roby Vincent, Richard Lazaar Vincent

Vincent (12 February 1946 - 30 August 1991) was an Indian actor from Kerala. He was active during the 1970s and 80s and acted in about 160+ Malayalam films, many of them as leading actor. He was born in Edavanakad Vypin. A handsome lead during the ’70s, he was known for the mainstream ‘heartthrob’ image. He was a romantic and action hero of his time.

== Personal life ==
Vincent was married to Mary, who was working as a teacher in Chennai Public School, Chennai. He died of a heart attack on 31 August 1991 at the age of 45. Vincent's wife Mary died on 15 October 2016 in a road accident near Thirumangalam, Chennai. They are survived by their two sons; Roby Vincent, an assistant film director who was with Director Bala and is currently working in Tamil and Malayalam films. Second son is Richard Lazaar Vincent, who is in Dubai.

== Career ==
Vincent started his career in the late 1960s and became one of the most successful Malayalam film actors of the 1970s. He performed with such notable leading men as Sathyan, Prem Nazir, Madhu, Jayan, M. G. Soman, Mammootty, Mohanlal and Kamal Haasan. He had acted opposite many leading heroines of Malayalam film including Sridevi, Sheela, Jayabharathi, Vijayasree, Vidhubala, Rani Chandra, Lakshmi, and Srividya. He was famous for his performances in various films in the 1970s including Ulsavam (1975) and Anubhavam (1976), both directed by I. V. Sasi. One of his last notable films was Inspector Balram, released in 1991.

== Filmography ==
- 1991 – Inspector Balram
- 1991 – Goodbye To Madras
- 1991 – Raid as Sathyasheelan
- 1990 – Avasanathe Rathri
- 1990 – Nammude Naadu as Gopinath
- 1989 – Kali karyamaai: Crime Branch as Anandan
- 1988 – 1921
- 1988 – Abkari
- 1988 – Charavalayam as Chalayil Ouseppachan
- 1988 – Evidence
- 1988 – Bheekaran as Gopi
- 1988 – Theruvu Narthaki as Raghunadhan
- 1988 – Janmashatru as Nissar
- 1987 – Nalkkavala
- 1987 – Ee Nootandile Maharogam
- 1987 – Mangalya Charthu as Srikumar
- 1987 – Kaalathinte Sabhdam as Chandrabhanu
- 1987 – Kalarathri
- 1987 – Vrutham as Customs Officer
- 1987 – Kanikanum Nerom
- 1986 – Adukkan Enteluppam
- 1986 – Niramulla Raavukal
- 1986 – Pidikittapulli
- 1985 – Idanilangal as Kittunni
- 1985 – Kiratham
- 1985 - Angadikkappurathu as Police Inspector
- 1985 – Madhuvidhu Therum Munpe
- 1985 – Karimbinpoovinakkare
- 1984 – Unaroo
- 1984 – Nishedi as Karunakara Kurup
- 1984 – Oru Nimisham Tharoo as Madhu
- 1984 – Adiyozhukkukal
- 1984 – Vikadakavi
- 1983 – Ineyenkilum as Avarachan
- 1983 – Ente Katha
- 1983 – Belt Mathai
- 1983 – Varanamer Awashmundu
- 1983 – Asuran
- 1983 – Lourde Mathavu
- 1982 – Innalenkil Nale
- 1982 – Vidichathum Kothichathum as Damu
- 1982 – Jambulingam
- 1981 – Asthamikkatha Pakalukal as Babu
- 1981 – Avatharam as Jamal
- 1981 – Arathi
- 1981 – Guha as Dr Prasad
- 1980 – Swargadevatha
- 1980 – Ithikara Pakki
- 1979 – Arattu
- 1979 – Kannukal
- 1979 – Swapnagal Swanthamalla
- 1979 – Lajjavathi as Rajashekharan Nair
- 1979 – Pancharathnam
- 1979 – Nithyavasantham
- 1979 – Iniyum Kanam as Devan
- 1979 – College Beauty
- 1979 – Lilly Pookkal
- 1979 – Manavadharam
- 1979 – Kochuthampuratti
- 1979 – Ival Oru Nadodi
- 1979 – Ponnil Kulicha Rathri
- 1979 – Mani Koya Kuruppu
- 1978 – Sootrakari
- 1978 – Madhurikkunna Rathri
- 1978 – Aval Vishvashthayairunnu as Johny
- 1978 – Avakasham
- 1978 – Anakalari
- 1978 – Puthariyankam
- 1978 – Gandharvam
- 1978 – Chakrayudham
- 1978 – Theeragal
- 1978 – Aalmarattom
- 1978 – Society Lady
- 1978 – Jalatharangam
- 1978 – Viswaroopam
- 1978 – Adikkadi
- 1978 – Anayum Ambariyum
- 1978 – Pockettadikkari
- 1978 – Kanalkattakal as Maaran/Venu
- 1978 – Black Belt
- 1978 - Karimpuli
- 1978 – Mani Koya Kurup
- 1978 – Snehathinte Mukhangal
- 1978 – Tiger salim
- 1978 – Pavadakkari
- 1978 – Adimakachavadam
- 1977 – Unnai Suttrum Ulagam a Tamil movie
- 1977 – Angeekaaram as Vijayan
- 1977 – Penpuli
- 1977 – Vezhambal
- 1977 – Varadakshina
- 1977 – Karnaparvam
- 1977 – Anugraham as Ravi
- 1977 – Manassoru Mayil
- 1977 – Anthardaaham
- 1977 – Rajaparambara
- 1977 – Pallavi
- 1977 – Thaalappoli
- 1977 – Alahu Akbar
- 1977 – Bhaaryaavijayam
- 1977 – Pattalam Janaki
- 1977 – Sangamam
- 1977 – Niraparayum Nilavilakkum
- 1977 – Chakravarthini
- 1977 – Ammaayi Amma
- 1977 – Pattalam Janaki
- 1976 – Chottanikkara Amma
- 1976 – Anubhavam
- 1976 – Sexilla Stundilla
- 1976 – Madhuram Thirumadhuram
- 1976 – Rajanganam
- 1976 – Ayalkkari as Raju
- 1976 – Sindhooram
- 1976 – Aalinganam as Vinod
- 1976 – Priyamvada
- 1976 – Abinandanam
- 1976 – Anubavam
- 1976 – Yudhabhoomi
- 1976 – Manasaveena
- 1976 – Kayamkulam Kochunnide Makan
- 1976 – Kadarumasam
- 1976 – Rathriyile Yathrakkar
- 1976 – Conelum Collectorum
- 1976 – Rajankanam
- 1976 – Kuttichattan
- 1975 – Picnic
- 1975 – Boyfriend
- 1975 – Penpada as Venu
- 1975 – Chandanachola
- 1975 – Priyamulla sofia
- 1975 – Tourist Banglow
- 1975 – Pravaham as Vijayan
- 1975 – Bhoogolam Thiriyunnu
- 1975 – Karimpuli
- 1975 – Kalyanasouganthikam
- 1975 – Velicham Akale
- 1975 – Mattoru Seetha
- 1975 – Love Letter
- 1975 – Criminals (Kayangal)
- 1975 – Malsaram
- 1975 – Priye Ninakuvendi
- 1975 – Bharyaye Avashyamundu
- 1975 – Dharmashethre Kurushethre
- 1975 – Kalyanapanthal
- 1975 – Ulsavam as Babu
- 1974 – Pancha Thanthram as Circle Inspector
- 1974 – Nathoon
- 1974 – Durga
- 1974 – Swarnavigraham
- 1974 – Suprabatham
- 1974 – Pattabhishekam as Kumar/Vincent
- 1974 – Nadanmare Avashyamundu
- 1974 – Poonthenaruvi as Sunny
- 1973 – Panchavadi
- 1973 – Ragging
- 1973 – Kaadu as Veeran
- 1973 – Achani
- 1973 – Jesus
- 1973 – Manassu
- 1973 – Aradika as Jayan
- 1973 – Achani as Gopi
- 1973 – Kavitha
- 1973 – Manushyaputhran as Thommi
- 1973 – Bhadradeepam as Mohan
- 1973 – Azhakulla Saleena as Johny
- 1973 – Urvashi Bharathi
- 1973 – Ladies Hostel as Ravi
- 1973 – Padmavyuham as Sunny
- 1973 – Driksakshi as Gopinath
- 1973 – Kalachakram as Abhayan
- 1972 – Kandavarundo as Shekhara Varma
- 1972 – Achannum Bapayum as Devadas
- 1972 – Taxi Car as Vincent
- 1972 – Sathi
- 1972 – Maravil Thirivu Sookshikkuka as Murukan
- 1971 – Karakanakadal as Joykutty
- 1971 – Ratrivandi as Babu
- 1971 – Kochaniyathi as Mohan
- 1971 – Moonu Pookkal
- 1971 – Ernakulam Junction as Thampi
- 1970 – Madhuvidhu as Gopi/Madhu (double role)
- 1970 – Bheekara Nimishagal as Murali
- 1970 – Moodalmanju as Prasad
- 1970 – Swapnangal as Chandran
- 1970 - Nazhikakkallu (uncredited roll)
- 1969 – Rest house
