= List of Malayalam films of 1992 =

The following is a list of Malayalam films released in the year 1992.

Title	Director	Screenplay	Cast
Ayalathe Adheham	Rajasenan	Sasidharan Arattuvazhi	Jayaram, Gautami, Siddique, Vaishnavi
Utsavamelam	Suresh Unnithan		Suresh Gopi, Urvashi, Jagathy Sreekumar
Sadayam	Sibi Malayil	M. T. Vasudevan Nair	Mohanlal, Maathu, Thilakan, Nedumudi Venu
Kaazhchakkappuram	V. R. Gopalakrishnan		Mukesh, Sreeja, Jagathy Sreekumar
Kunukkitta Kozhi	Viji Thampi	Kaloor Dennis	Siddique, Jagadish, Parvathy, Rupini
Maanyanmar	T. S. Suresh Babu	Dennis Joseph	Mukesh, Ramya Krishnan, Sreenivasan
Radhachakram	P. Jaisingh		Jagathy Sreekumar, Abhilasha
Kauravar	Joshiy	A. K. Lohithadas	Mammootty, Vishnuvardhan, Babu Antony, Anju, Thilakan
Ennodu Ishtam Koodamo	Kamal	Raghunath Paleri	Mukesh, Madhoo, J. D. Chakravarthy
Aadhaaram	George Kithu	A K Lohithadas	Murali, Geetha, Suresh Gopi
Manthrikacheppu	Anil Babu	Kaloor Dennis	Jagadish, Siddique, Sunitha, Suchitra
Devi IAS	Idichakkaplamoodu Thulasi	Idichakkaplamoodu Thulasi	Viji Chandrasekhar
Chuvappu Thaalam	Babu Radhakrishnan		Abhilasha, Jahnvi, Lalithasree, Kuthiravattam Pappu, Kavara Sasankan, Jagathy Sreekumar
Kavacham	K. Madhu		Raghuvaran, Parvathy, Babu Antony
Chuvanna Kaippathi	V. Somasekharan		
Ezhara Ponnana	Thulasidas		Jayaram, Kanaka, Sai Kumar, Thilakan
Ponnurukkum Pakshi	Adoor Vaisakhan		Suresh Gopi, Sunitha
Ente Ponnu Thampuran	A. T. Abu		Suresh Gopi, Urvashi, Siddique, Innocent
Kamaladalam	Sibi Malayil	A. K. Lohithadas	Mohanlal, Parvathy, Monisha, Vineeth
Soorya Manasam	Viji Thampi		Mammootty, Raghuvaran, Sowcar Janaki
Apaaratha	I. V. Sasi	Sreekumaran Thampi	Rahman, Sukanya, Urvasi
Sargam	Hariharan		Vineeth, Manoj K. Jayan, Rambha
Johnnie Walker	Jayaraj	Ranjith	Mammootty, Ranjitha, Jeet Upendra
Kasargode Khadarbhai	Thulasidas	Kaloor Dennis	Siddique, Jagadish, Sunitha, Suchitra, Zainuddin,
Aham	Rajeevnath	Venu Nagavally	Mohanlal, Urvashi, Ramya Krishnan, Neena Gupta
Sathyaprathinja	Suresh Unnithan	S. L. Puram Sadanandan	Murali, Suresh Gopi, Geetha, Urvashi
My Dear Muthachan	Sathyan Anthikkad	Sreenivasan	Thilakan, Jayaram, Madhurima, Urvashi
Mukhamudra	Ali Akbar	J. Pallassery	Thilakan, Jagadish, Siddique, Sunitha
First Bell	P. G. Viswambaran	Kaloor Dennis	Jayaram, Jagadish, Siddique, Anusha
Welcome to Kodaikanal	Anil Babu		Jagadish, Siddique, Anusha, Shweta Menon
Avarude Sanketham	Joseph Vattolis		
Annu Good Friday	Beypore Mani		
Mahaan	Mohan Kumar		Suresh Gopi, Geetha
Rishi	J. Williams		
Rajashilpi	R. Sukumaran		Mohanlal, Bhanupriya
Aayushkalam	Kamal		Jayaram, Mukesh, Maathu, Sreenivasan
Makkal Mahatmyam	Paulson	Robin Thirumala	Innocent, Mukesh, Sai Kumar, Jagadish, Vaishnavi
Thalastaanam	Shaji Kailas	Renji Panicker	Suresh Gopi, Vijayakumar, Geetha, Narendra Prasad
Mahanagaram	T. K. Rajeev Kumar	Dennis Joseph	Mammootty, Thilakan, Shanthi Krishna
Nakshathrakoodaram	Joshy Mathew		Suresh Gopi, Shweta Menon
Neelakurukkan	Shaji Kailas		Ashokan, Baiju, Ganesh Kumar, Mahesh
Savidham	George Kithu	John Paul	Nedumudi Venu, Shanthi Krishna, Maathu, Sunitha
Ente Tuition Teacher	Suresh		
Pramanikal	Augustine Prakash		
Chevalier Michael	P. K. Baburaj		Jagathy, Anand Babu, Vinodini
Kunjikuruvi	Vinayan		Nedumudi Venu, Geetha
Yoddha	Sangeeth Sivan	Sasidharan Arattuvazhi	Mohanlal, Madhoo, Jagathy, Siddharth Lama
Kizhakkan Pathrose	T. S. Suresh Babu	Dennis Joseph	Mammootty, Urvashi, Parvathy, Raghuvaran
Adhwaytham	Priyadarsan	T. Damodaran	Mohanlal, Revathi, Jayaram, M. G. Soman, Chithra
Pappayude Swantham Appoos	Fazil	Fazil	Mammootty, Shobana, Suresh Gopi, Seena
Pandu Pandoru Rajakumari	Viji Thampi		Jagadish, Siddique, Anju
Valayam	Sibi Malayil	AK Lohithadas	Murali, Parvathy, Manoj K Jayan, Suvarna Mathew
Priyapetta Kukku	Sunil		Jagadish, Siddique, Charmila, Geetha
Snehasagaram	Sathyan Anthikkad	J. Pallassery	Murali, Sunitha, Urvashi, Manoj K. Jayan,
Grihaprevesam	Mohan Kupleri		Jagadish, Siddique, Rekha
Police Diary	K. G. Vijayakumar		Sukumaran, Rajalakshmi
Kallan Kappalil Thanne	Thevalakkara Chellappan		Jagadish, Siddique, Suchitra, Maathu
Kallanum Polisum	I. V. Sasi		Mukesh, Manoj K. Jayan
Oru Kochu Bhoomikulukkam	Chandrasekhar		Sreenivasan, Shobana, Monisha, Siddique
Mr & Mrs	Sajan	Rafi Mecartin	Jagadish, Siddique, Suchitra
Soorya Gayathri	Anil	John Paul	Mohanlal, Urvashi, Parvathy
Champakulam Thachan	Kamal	Sreenivasan	Murali, Vineeth, Rambha, Monisha, Madhu
Oottyppattanam	Haridas		Jayaram, Jagathy, Siddique, Easwari Rao
Thiruthalvaadi	Viji Thampi	Kaloor Dennis	Siddique, Jagadish, Urvashi, Sivaranjani
Simhadhwani	K. G. Rajasekharan		Thilakan, Urvashi, Suresh Gopi
Kudumbasammetham	Jayaraj	Kaloor Dennis	Manoj K. Jayan, Monisha, Madhu
Ellarum Chollanu	Kaladharan	Rafi Mecartin	Mukesh, Suman Ranganathan
Aardram	Suresh Unnithan		Murali, Sunitha, Urvashi
Vasudha	V. V. Babu		Innocent, Rekha, Rajan P. Dev
Naadody	Thampi Kannanthanam	T. A. Razzaq	Mohanlal, N. N. Pillai, Mohini, Suresh Gopi, Babu Antony
Vietnam Colony	Siddique-Lal	Siddique-Lal	Mohanlal, Kanaka, Innocent
Daddy	Sangeeth Sivan		Arvind Swamy, Gautami, Suresh Gopi
Congratulations Miss Anitha Menon	Thulasidas		Sai Kumar, Siddique, Jagadish
Kingini	A. N. Thampi		Prem Kumar, Ranjini
Swaroopam	K. R. Mohanan		Sreenivasan, Sandhya Rajendran
Daivathinte Vikrithikal	Lenin Rajendran		Raghuvaran, Srividhya, Vineeth, Malavika Avinash
Mayangunna Manassukal			
Omanikkaanoru Shishiram			
Ponnaramthottathe Raajaavu	P Anil, Babu Narayanan		Jagadish, Urvashi, Suresh Gopi
Poochakkaru Mani Kettum	Thulasidas		Mukesh, Siddique, Sunitha, Lakshmi
Sooryachakram			Sai Kumar, Jagathy Sreekumar
Avalariyathe			
Sabarimalayil Thanka Sooryodayam			
Start Immediately			
Mayilpeeli			
Ezhamedam			

== Dubbed films ==
Title	Director	Story	Screenplay	Cast
Annu Muthal Innu Vare	Keyan			
Sindhoora	Uma Maheswar			
