= Thesni Khan =

Indian actress

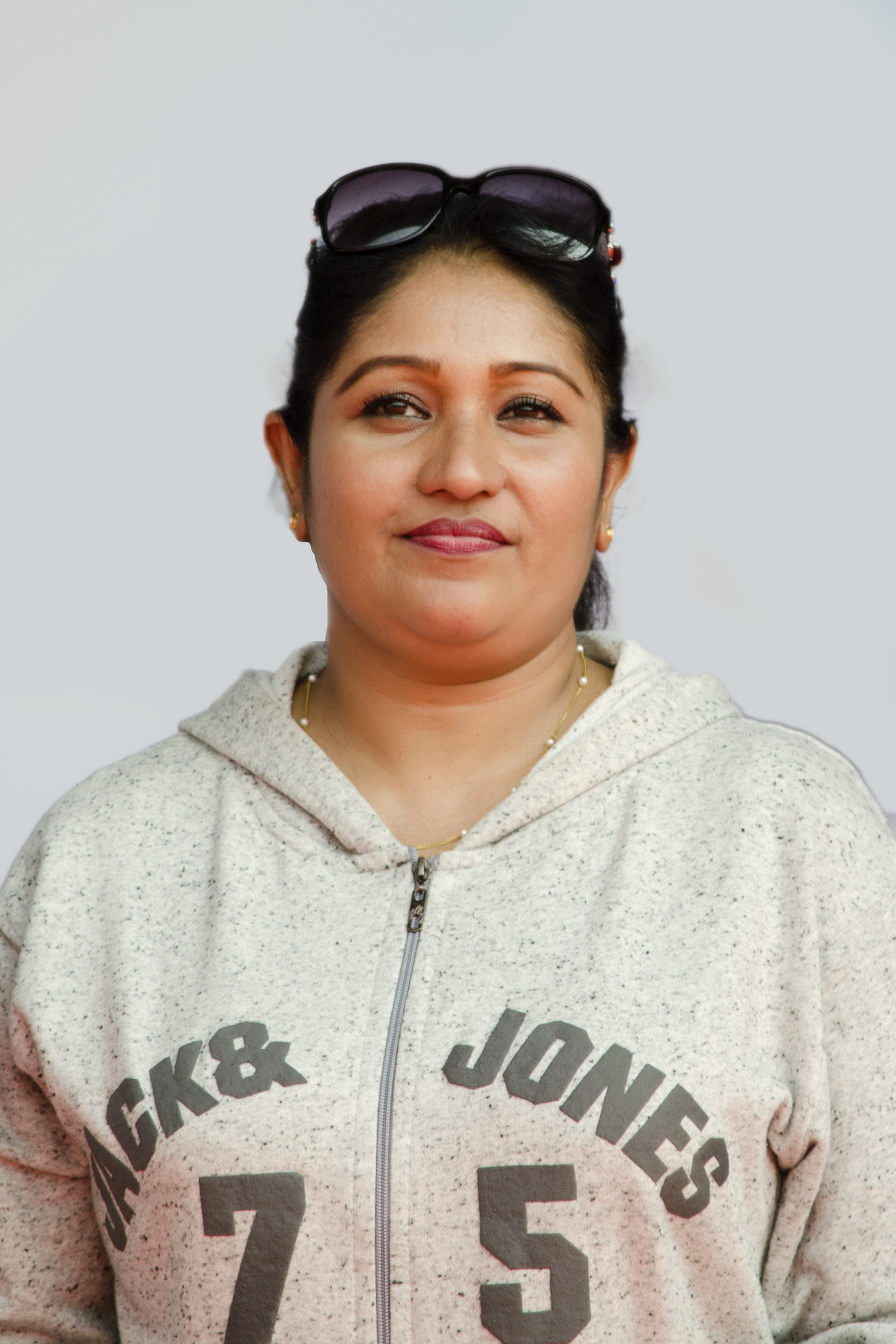
- Education: Cochin Kalabhavan
- Occupations: Actress; dancer; Television presenter
- Years active: 1988–present
- Parents: Ali Khan; Rukhiya

Thesni Khan is an Indian actress who appears in Malayalam films, television, and stage. She made her acting debut through Daisy in 1988. She is widely known for the portrayal of character roles. In 2020, she contested in the second season of Malayalam reality TV series Bigg Boss. Thesni is currently an active celebrity vlogger in YouTube channel "Thezbeen's".

== Personal life ==
Her father, Ali Khan, was a magician. In her early days, Thesni used to assist her father during magic shows conducted on various stages. She later studied at Cochin Kalabhavan.

== Filmography ==
| Year | Title | Role | Notes |
|---|---|---|---|
| 1988 | Daisy | Daisy's classmate | |
| 1988 | Aparan | Job seeker | |
| 1988 | Vaishali | Thozhy | |
| 1988 | Moonnam Pakkam | Vani | |
| 1989 | Dasharatham | Nurse | |
| 1990 | In Harihar Nagar | Mahadevan's lover | Cameo |
| 1990 | Shubhayathra | Arundhathi's sister | |
| 1990 | Kalikkalam | Suhra | |
| 1990 | Gajakesariyogam | Karthika's friend | |
| 1990 | Sasneham | Nurse | |
| 1990 | Ee Thanutha Veluppan Kalathu | Vasudev's daughter | |
| 1990 | Mukham | Shop keeper | |
| 1990 | Vembanad | Elder daughter | |
| 1991 | Godfather | Mercy | |
| 1991 | Kilukkampetti | - | Special Appearance in the Song |
| 1991 | Njan Gandharvan | Bhama's friend | |
| 1991 | Ennum Nanmakal | Saradha | |
| 1991 | Kanalkkattu | Ruby | |
| 1991 | Mimics Parade | Dance teacher | |
| 1991 | Kakkathollayiram | Suhara | |
| 1992 | Ayalathe Adheham | Premachandran's neighbor | |
| 1992 | Kallan Kappalil Thanne | Rajani | |
| 1992 | Ennodu Ishtam Koodamo | Arathy's friend | |
| 1992 | My Dear Muthachan | Meera's friend | |
| 1992 | Neelakurukkan | Anitha's friend | |
| 1992 | Congratulations Miss Anitha Menon | Meera | |
| 1992 | Ente Ponnu Thampuran | Seetha | |
| 1992 | Thiruthalvaadi | Sudha | |
| 1993 | Uppukandam Brothers | Chacko's daughter | |
| 1993 | Journalist | Soman's wife | |
| 1993 | Aagneyam | Krishnadas's wife | |
| 1993 | Bhagyavan | Thankamani | |
| 1994 | Kadal | Annamma | |
| 1994 | Napoleon | Laila | |
| 1994 | Kambolam | Market vendor | |
| 1995 | Kusruthikaatu | Riya | |
| 1995 | Minnaminuginum Minnukettu | Nancy | |
| 1995 | Karma | Mary | |
| 1995 | King Soloman | Sainabha | |
| 1996 | Kireedamillatha Rajakkanmar | Reksi | |
| 1996 | Ishtamanu Nooru Vattam | Guest appearance | |
| 1997 | Oru Mutham Manimutham | Ammootty | |
| 1998 | Meenathil Thalikettu | Nancy | |
| 1999 | Veendum Chila Veettukaryangal | Leelamma | |
| 2000 | Kochu Kochu Santhoshangal | Herself | Cameo |
| 2000 | Sahayathrikakku Snehapoorvam | Hostel Warden | |
| 2000 | Aanamuttathe Aangalamar | Jayabharathi | |
| 2001 | Sundara Purushan | Tuition teacher | |
| 2002 | Kanneer Pookkal | - | Telefilm for Kairali |
| 2004 | Njan Salperu Ramankutty | Ramankutty's sister | |
| 2004 | Masanagudi Mannadiyar Speaking | Deepa | |
| 2004 | Priyam Priyamkaram | Janaki | |
| 2006 | Orikkal Koodi | - | Short film |
| 2008 | Gopalapuranam | Sandra | |
| 2008 | Innathe Chintha Vishayam | Immanuel's wife | |
| 2008 | Bullet | - | |
| 2009 | Kappal Muthalaali | Cicily | |
| 2010 | Pokkiri Raja | Manoharan's wife | |
| 2010 | Thaskara Lahala | PC Jameela | |
| 2010 | Chaverpada | Cleopatra | |
| 2010 | Kaaryasthan | Devika | |
| 2010 | Again Kasargod Khader Bhai | Shittymol | |
| 2010 | Paappi Appacha | Shailaja | |
| 2010 | Tournament | Daughter in law | |
| 2010 | Fiddle | Leelamani | |
| 2010 | Swantham Bharya Zindabad | Ambujam | |
| 2010 | Chatmates | Haseena | Home cinema |
| 2010 | Kunjikka Pidicha Pulivalu | Ayisha | Home cinema |
| 2011 | Seniors | Call girl with Alaudeen Rauthar | Extended Cameo |
| 2011 | Beautiful | Kanyaka | |
| 2011 | Sarkar Colony | Mariyama David | |
| 2012 | Kunjaliyan | Prameela, Vishwan's wife | |
| 2012 | Diamond Necklace | Santhamma | |
| 2012 | Mr. Marumakan | Indu | |
| 2012 | Bachelor Party | Nurse | |
| 2012 | Trivandrum Lodge | Kanyaka Menon | Pending—SIIMA Award for Best Actress in a Supporting Role(Nominated) |
| 2012 | Thappana | Kochappi's wife | |
| 2012 | Ardhanaari | Vinayan's sister | |
| 2012 | Da Thadiya | Rani Thadikaran | |
| 2012 | Theruvunakshathrangal | Vilasini | |
| 2013 | Kammath & Kammath | Kammath's servant | |
| 2013 | Breaking News Live | Suhara | |
| 2013 | Radio | Dhamayanthi | |
| 2013 | Hotel California | Shirly | |
| 2013 | Tourist Home | Reality show aspirant's mom | |
| 2013 | Kadal Kadannoru Mathukkutty | A woman in Mathukkutty's village | |
| 2013 | Pullipulikalum Aattinkuttiyum | Jalaja | |
| 2013 | Kunjananthante Kada | Shyamala | |
| 2013 | Daivathinte Swantham Cleetus | Kumbalangi Maria | |
| 2013 | Ginger | Sathi | |
| 2013 | Bundy Chor | - | |
| 2013 | Kochin Mimi | Thesni | Short film |
| 2013 | For Sale | | |
| 2013 | Punyalan Agarbattis | Gracy | |
| 2014 | Polytechnic | Ponnamma | |
| 2014 | Law Point | | |
| 2014 | How Old Are You | Rani | |
| 2014 | Call me @ | Mercy | |
| 2014 | Avatharam | Priya | |
| 2014 | Bhaiyya Bhaiyya | Vasanthi | |
| 2014 | Mathai Kuzhappakkaranalla | Omana | |
| 2014 | The Dolphins | Mehajubeen | |
| 2014 | Venalodungathe | - | |
| 2015 | Six | Sundari | |
| 2015 | Love 24x7 | Wife at cafe | Cameo |
| 2015 | Loham | Nurse | |
| 2015 | Thilothama | Saritha | |
| 2015 | Amar Akbar Anthony | Nurse | |
| 2015 | Urumbukal Urangarilla | Rosely | |
| 2016 | Moonam Naal Njyayarazhcha | Rosakutty | |
| 2016 | Darvinte Parinamam | Parthan's wife | |
| 2016 | Happy Wedding | Bus Conductress | |
| 2016 | Angane Thanne Netave Anchettanam Pinnale | Padmajam | |
| 2016 | Welcome to Central Jail | Bhavani | |
| 2016 | Thoppil Joppan | Alice | |
| 2016 | Swarna Kaduva | N/A | Lovely's voice (Ineya) |
| 2017 | Fukri | Nabisa | |
| 2017 | Achayans | Valsa | |
| 2017 | Ayal Jeevichirippundu | Radhika Gopal | |
| 2017 | Prethamundu Sookshikkuka | CPO Doramol | |
| 2017 | Sunday Holiday | Shilpa | |
| 2017 | Pullikkaran Staraa | Mridula | |
| 2017 | Lava Kusha (2017) | Saritha | |
| 2017 | Paippin Chuvattile Pranayam | Philomina | |
| 2017 | Aana Alaralodalaral | Hajara Beevi | |
| 2017 | Masterpiece | | |
| 2017 | Vimaanam | Jaya | |
| 2017 | Kalyanarathri | Kanakan's wife | Short film |
| 2017 | Controversy | | Short film |
| 2018 | Kayamkulam Kochunni | Aatta | |
| 2018 | Oru Kuttanadan Blog | Panchayat Member | |
| 2018 | Kaithola Chathan | Nairachan's wife | |
| 2018 | Ner Varennu Mmini Cherinju Ttaa | - | |
| 2018 | Ippozhum Eppozhum Sthuthiyayirikkatte | Daisy | |
| 2018 | Oru Aadhar Love | Lover | Album |
| 2019 | Kodathi Samaksham Balan Vakeel | Anuradha's stepmother | |
| 2019 | Ottam | Rejina | |
| 2019 | Madhura Raja | Mrs. Manoharan | |
| 2019 | Subharathri | Sainabha | |
| 2019 | Fancy Dress | Parvathy | |
| 2019 | Pattabhiraman | Rani | |
| 2019 | Makkanna | Rukhiya | |
| 2019 | Thelivu | Saramma | |
| 2019 | Aakasha Ganga 2 | Sundari | |
| 2019 | Ulta | SI Meenakshi | |
| 2021 | Vaanku | Zulfi | |
| 2021 | Black Coffee | Tamannaah | |
| 2022 | Chekkan | Asiya | |
| 2022 | Gold | News Reporter | |
| 2023 | Oru Sadhachara Premakatha | | |
| 2024 | Little Hearts | | |
| 2025 | Once Upon A Time There Was A Kallan | Daisy | |
| 2026 | Chatha Pacha | Suprajamma | |
| 2026 | Prempaatta † | Shahbaz's mother | |

== Television serials ==
| Year(s) | Show | Channel |
|---|---|---|
| 1993–2013 | Cinemala | Asianet |
| 1995 | Pennurimai | |
| 1996 | Tharavadu | DD Malayalam |
| 1996 | Melappadam | Doordarshan |
| 1996 | Olakkuda | DD Malayalam |
| 1997 | Alathachakram | DD Malayalam |
| 1997 | Paying Guest | DD Malayalam |
| 1998 | Gokulam | Asianet |
| 1999 | Pakida Pakida Pambaram | DD Malayalam |
| 2000 | Comicola | Asianet |
| 2000 | Jagapoga | Kairali TV |
| 2000 | Snehaseema | Doordarshan |
| 2000 | Kudumbarahasyam | |
| 2000 | Ambalakkara UP School | DD Malayalam |
| 2001 | Swararagam | Asianet |
| 2004 | Ladies Corner | |
| 2004 | Chitta | Surya TV |
| 2005 | Ayyadi Maname | Kairali TV |
| 2005 | Sindooracheppu | Amrita TV |
| 2005 | Sundari Sundari | Surya TV |
| 2005 | Sandhanagopalam | Asianet |
| 2006 | Priyam | Kairali TV |
| 2007–2008 | 8 Sundharikallum Njanum | Surya TV |
| 2007 | Ente Manasaputhri | Asianet |
| 2009 | Ente Alphonsama | Asianet |
| 2009 | Akkare Ikkare | Asianet |
| 2009 | Velankanni Mathavu | Surya TV |
| 2009 | Autograph | Asianet |
| 2011 | Kadamattathachan | Surya TV |
| 2011 | Chakyarum Kappyarum Pinne Moyillyarum | Surya TV |
| 2011 | Manassariyathe | Kairali TV |
| 2013 | Abhinethri | Surya TV |
| 2013 | Kuttikurumban | Kairali TV |
| 2014 | Kusruthikuttan | Kairali TV |
| 2018 | Love Jihad | |
| 2018 | Adutha Bullodu Koodi Nadakam Aarambikkam | Zee Keralam |
| 2020 | John Jaffer Janardhanan | Surya TV |
| 2024–present | Super Kanmani | Mazhavil Manorama |

== Dramas ==
- Atham Pathinu Ponnonam

Other Works

She has judged popular reality show Comedy Stars on Asianet, Five Minutes Fun Star on Kaumudi TV and Jagapoga on Kairali TV..She has attended popular talk shows such as Nammal Thammil, and Sreekandannair Show. She has acted in some tele-films also. She has participated in popular game shows such as 1.1.3 on Mazhavil Manorama and Sarigama on Asianet. She has supported Beena Antony and Manoj Kumar in reality show Sundari Neeyum Sundaran Njaanum on Asianet. She has performed in various stages as a dancer, comedy artist, supporting artist, etc. She is very knowledgeable about magic. She has acted in some advertisements also. She also contested in the reality show Bigg Boss (Malayalam season 2) on Asianet, hosted by actor Mohanlal. She entered the house on 5 January 2020 on day-1 as one among the 17 housemates and was evicted on day-27.

== Other shows ==
- 2020: Bigg Boss (Malayalam season 2)
- Onavillu Bigg Boss Mamangam
- Asianet BB Dhamaka
- Amma Mazhavillu
- Vanitha Magazine
- Ladies Corner
- Star Jam (Kappa TV)
- Ningalkkariyamo?(Surya TV)
- Ruchiyude Onam
- Comedy Time (Surya TV)
- Star Ragging (Kairali TV)
- Thesni Magic Show
- Snehitha Arangu Segment (Amrita TV)
- Valkkanadi (Asianet)
- Shubharahtri (Jeevan TV)
- Art Cafe (Kairali People TV)
- CCL
- I Personally
- Ente Katha
- Gulumal
- Taste Time (Asianet)
- Ividinganannu Bhai (Mazhavil Manorama)
- Badai Bungalow Asianet)
- Chat Room (Jaihind TV)
- Cinema Chirimaa (Mazhavil Manorama)
- Nammal Thammil (Asianet)
- Kerala Cafe (Kairali TV)
- Cinema Company (Kaumudi TV)
- Students Only (Kairali TV)
- E Buz (Mathrubhumi News)
- Students Only (Kairali TV)
- Don't DO Don't do (Asianet Plus)
- Meet The Editors (Reporter TV)
- Chirikkum Pattanam (Kairali TV)
- Smart Show (Flowers TV)
- Home Minister (Amrita TV)
- Annachi Paattu
- La Jihad
- I Me Myself
- Run Kerala Run
- Spotligt
- Aakruti
- Komady Circus (Mazhavil Manorama)
- Comedy Awards (Flowers TV)
- Ningalkkum Aakaam Kodeeshwaran
- Anand Film Awards
- Grand Magical Circus
- Day with a star
- Urvashi Theatres
- Adar Onam
- Onnanu Nammal
- De Maveli Kombath
- Nakshathrathilakkam
- Comedy Sthreekal
- JB Junction
- Vanitha
- Indiaglitz
- Start Music Aaradhyam Padum
- Start Music Season 3
- Comedy Utsavam
- Meet My Guest
- Panajri Pradhaman
- Make Over
- Icebreak with Veena
- Kalabhavan Ormakalum Pinne Njangalum
- Kutty Chef
- Valentines Corner
- Let's Rock N Roll
- Parayam Nedam
- Red Carpet
- Funs Upon A Time
- Comedy Masters
- Flowers Oru Kodi
- Panam Tharum Padam
