= Irikku M.D. Akathundu =

Irikku M. D. Akathundu
- Directed by: P. G. Vishwambharan
- Screenplay by: Kaloor Dennis
- Story by: Kalabhavan Ansar
- Produced by: V. M. Basheer
- Starring: Mukesh; Siddique; Zainuddin; Saikumar
- Cinematography: Ramachandra Babu
- Edited by: G. Venkitaraman
- Music by: Shyam
- Production company: Vimbis Production
- Distributed by: Soori Release
- Release date: 1991
- Country: India
- Language: Malayalam

Irikku M. D. Akathundu is a 1991 comedy thriller Malayalam film directed by P. G. Vishwambharan. The film was produced by V. M. Basheer under the banner of Vimbis Production. It stars Mukesh, Siddique, Kalabhavan Zainuddin, Saikumar in the lead roles. After this film, Rizabawa went on to play villainous roles in many films such as Thiruthalvaadi (1992), Vakkeel Vasudev (1993) and Malappuram Haji Mahanaya Joji (1994). The film was a box office success and marks the debut of Baiju Ezhupunna.

== Plot ==
Four young men start a staffing agency to help unemployed people get a job. But trouble happens when they can't find jobs for people and when a mysterious girl shows up one night.

== Cast ==
- Mukesh as Jayan
- Siddique as Sunny
- Zainuddin as Abdul Nazer
- Saikumar as Suresh
- Innocent as Samuel
- Rizabawa as Shreedharan Shreekumar
- Sunitha as Ancy Sreedharan
- Geetha Vijayan as Manju Samuel
- Alummoodan as Sunny's father
- K.P.A.C. Sunny as Chief minister Sukumaran Nair Parameshawaran Nair
- Baiju Ezhupunna
