= Manthrikacheppu =

- Directed by: Anil Babu
- Written by: Kaloor Dennis
- Story by: Kaloor Dennis
- Produced by: M. Thulasidharan
- Starring: Jagadish; Siddique; Saikumar; Sunitha; Zainuddin
- Cinematography: Ravi K. Chandran
- Edited by: P. C. Mohanan
- Music by: Johnson
- Production company: Madhav Movies
- Distributed by: Jubilant Films
- Release date: 1992
- Country: India
- Language: Malayalam

Manthrikacheppu is a 1992 comedy thriller Malayalam film directed by Anil Babu. The film was produced by M. Thulasidharan under the banner of Madhav Movies. It stars Jagadish, Siddique, Kalabhavan Zainuddin, Saikumar in the lead roles.

== Plot ==
Raju (Jagadeesh) comes to the city to stay with his uncle.He is seeking a job He meets up with Williams( Siddique) who is a videographer and becomes william's assistant Some hilarious events follows. While recording a political event they inadvertently capture the assassination of the chief minister. The video taken by them becomes crucial evidence in the case. Rest of the films revolves around how they evade the villains so as to submit this crucial evidence to the police.

The plot element seems to be inspired by Rajiv Gandhi Assassination which happened in 1991.

== Cast ==
- Jagadish as Raju
- Siddique as Williams
- Saikumar as Sabu Cherian
- Sunitha as Shyama
- Suchitra as Mercy
- Zainuddin as Usthad Seythali
- Rizabawa as Jackson
- Krishnankutty Nair as V. K. Nair
- Mala Aravindan as Balagopalan Nait
- Devan as John Samuel
- Thodupuzha Vasanthi as Padmavati
