= Gajakesariyogam =

- Poster
- Directed by: P. G. Viswambharan
- Written by: Babu. G. Nair (Story) Kaloor Dennis (Screenplay)
- Starring: Innocent; Mukesh
- Cinematography: Saroj Padi
- Edited by: G.Murali
- Music by: Johnson
- Release date: 7 November 1990
- Country: India
- Language: Malayalam

Gajakesariyogam (transl. A good period of time / The fate of owning an elephant) is a 1990 Indian Malayalam-language film directed by P. G. Viswambharan and stars Innocent and Mukesh. The film is about the struggles faced by Ayyappan Nair after purchasing an elephant named Sreevidya from a North Indian circus company that only knows Hindi. It was one of the many films in which Innocent and K.P.A.C Lalitha play an on-screen couple. The film became a box office success.

== Plot ==
Ayyappan Nair, a mahout, wants to own an elephant. He takes a loan to buy an elephant, however, trouble brews when he is unable to repay it.

== Cast ==
- Innocent as Ayyappan Nair
- Mukesh as Vinayachandran aka Vinayan
- Jagadish as Parasuraman
- Sunita as Karthika
- K. P. A. C. Lalitha as Madhavi
- Mamukkoya as Raghavan Nair
- K. B. Ganesh Kumar as Vasu
- Paravoor Bharathan as Khader
- Thesni Khan as Suhara, Khader's daughter and Karthika's friend
- Baiju as Gireesh, Thahasildhar's brother
- Siddique as Collector
- Oduvil Unnikrishnan as Thahasildhar
- Philomina as Thahasildhar's mother
- Sukumaran as Sethu
- Kunchan as Ajayan
- Balan K Nair as Nambiar
- Sainuddin as Minister Veera Raghava Pillai

== Production ==
K. P. A. C. Lalitha shot for this film in Shoranur along with another film by her husband Bharathan.

== Themes and influences ==
Innocent plays a Malayali man who learns Hindi in this film. Innocent went on to play a Hindi-speaking politician in Sandesham (1991). The film explores the bond between a man and an elephant. This bond is seen in other films, such as Aanachandam (2006). A scene in the film was based on an incident in the unreleased Malayalam film Chottanikkara Bhagawathi. The incident revolved around an art director who was scared of the elephant and started moving after the director called action although the elephant and the mahout did not move.

== Soundtrack ==
The soundtrack of the film was composed by Johnson and the lyrics were written by Kaithapram Damodaran Namboothiri. The film features two songs and one of which is "Aanachantham" with Innocent and the elephant. It is one of the "cutest songs of Mollywood" according to the New Indian Express.

Song title	Singer(s)
"Aanachandam"	Innocent
"Niramaalakkaavil"	Unni Menon, Sujatha Mohan, Chorus

== Reception and legacy ==
In a review of the film in December 2021, Silpa Rajan of The Times of India opined that "The movie is absolutely engaging, entertaining, and heartwarming and also lays out the problems faced by naïve and gold-hearted people who step foot [sic] into the uncharted waters of business".

The scenes where Mukesh's character teaches Innocent's character Hindi became famous.
