= Suchitra Murali =

Indian actress

- Born: Suchitra; 21 April 1975 (age 51); Thiruvananthapuram, Kerala
- Occupation: Actress
- Years active: 1990–2003
- Spouse: Murali
- Children: 1
- Relatives: Deepu Karunakaran (Brother)

Suchitra Murali, commonly known by her stage name Suchitra, is an Indian actress. Debuting in the lead role with the 1990 film No.20 Madras Mail at the age of 14. she has appeared mostly in Malayalam films as well as few Tamil films.

== Personal life ==
Suchitra received her primary education from Holy Angel's Convent Trivandrum. She is married to Murali and has a daughter named Neha. She also has a sister named Sumitra and a brother, Deepu Karunakaran, who is a film director.

== Career ==
Suchitra started her career as a child artist and made her debut as a lead actress with No.20 Madras Mailstarring opposite Mohanlal, with Mammooty appearing in a cameo role. Her next major lead role came in the superhit Mimics Parade(1991), in which she starred opposite Jagadeesh. The success of their pairing led to several more films together, many of which also featured Siddique and Sunitha in prominent roles. Widely regarded as one of the most beautiful actresses in the 90s, Suchitra was very popular amongst the youth due to her versatility in acting.

She made her Tamil debut in a lead role with the 1991 release Gopura Vasalile opposite Karthik also featuring Bhanupriya. Among her other notable performances were starring opposite Shankar in Abhimanyu (1991), portraying Mohanlal’s sister in Bharatham (1991), and playing one of Mammootty’s five sisters in the blockbuster Hitler (1996). By the time she left the industry, she had already acted in 38 movies in both lead and supporting roles.

Suchitra is also a trained Indian Classical dancer. She was trained in Bharatanatyam, Mohiniyattam, and Kuchipudi by Guru V. Mythili.

== Other activities ==
Suchitra was the Joint Secretary twice (1997-2000 & 2000–2003) in the AMMA. Her versatility and application during her tenure was well appreciated by the other members. Suchitra was also seen recently as a celebrity judge in episodes of the popular reality shows Idea Star Singer and Vodafone Comedy Stars, both on Asianet. She also represented Kerala in the "Miss World Pageant" held in Bangalore in 1997.

In 2022, she appeared on an episode of the game show, Panam Tharum Padom alongside actor and host Jagadish on Mazhavil Manorama.

== Filmography ==
Year	Film	Role	Language	Notes
1978	Aaravam		Malayalam	Child Artist
1978	Adimakkachavadam		Malayalam	Child Artist
1979	Ente Sneham Ninakku Mathrem		Malayalam	Child Artist
1980	Angaadi		Malayalam	Child Artist
1981	Aambalpoovu		Malayalam	Child Artist
1981	Oothikachiya Ponnu		Malayalam	Child Artist
1984	Swarnagopuram		Malayalam	Child Artist
1987	Vrutham	Usha	Malayalam	Child Artist
1990	No.20 Madras Mail	Devi R. Nair	Malayalam	Debut Film as Heroine (Aged only 14), Lead role
1990	Kuttettan	Nurse	Malayalam	Cameo role
1990	Kshanakkathu	Sales girl	Malayalam	Cameo role
1990	Commander		Malayalam	
1990	Enquiry		Malayalam	
1990	Paadatha Veenayum Paadum		Malayalam	
1991	Chakravarthy		Malayalam	
1991	Abhimanyu	Radha	Malayalam	
1991	Mimics Parade	Latha	Malayalam	Lead role
1991	Ezhunnallathu	Sunanda	Malayalam	
1991	Mookkillarajyathu	Dance Teacher	Malayalam	
1991	Kadinjool Kalyanam	Ramani	Malayalam	
1991	Nayam Vyakthamakkunnu	Rosili	Malayalam	
1991	Athirathan	Nimmy	Malayalam	
1991	Gopura Vasalile	Kasthuri	Tamil	Tamil debut, Lead role, Appears in Flashback
1991	Bharatham	Radha	Malayalam	
1992	Kallan Kappalil Thanne	Gayathri	Malayalam	Lead role
1992	Thalastaanam	Supriya	Malayalam	
1992	Mantrikacheppu	Mercy	Malayalam	Lead role
1992	Neelakurukkan	Meera	Malayalam	
1992	Mr & Mrs	Ashwathi	Malayalam	Lead role
1992	Kasargod Khader Bhai	Latha	Malayalam	Lead role
1992	Makkal Mahatmyam	Ammu	Malayalam	
1992	Maarathon (Aayaraam Gayaaraam)		Malayalam	
1993	Kavadiyattam	Thankamani	Malayalam	
1993	Bhagyavaan	Meena	Malayalam	Lead role
1993	Sthreedhanam	Sushamma	Malayalam	
1993	Sowbhagyam	Rejini	Malayalam	Lead role
1993	Sthalathe Pradhana Payyans	Gouri	Malayalam	Lead role
1993	Kanyakumariyil Oru Kavitha	Annice	Malayalam	
1993	Cheppadividya	Inspector's wife	Malayalam	
1993	Airport	Uma	Tamil	
1994	Tharavadu	Rajani	Malayalam	
1994	Kashmeeram	Mithra	Malayalam	
1994	Sukham Sukhakaram /Ipadikku Kaadhal	Stella	Malayalam/Tamil	
1994	Padhavi	Unknown	Malayalam	
1995	Thakshashila	Motti	Malayalam	
1995	Aavarthanam		Malayalam	
1996	Hitler	Gayathri	Malayalam	Sister role
1996	Ammuvinte Aangalamar		Malayalam	
1997	Shibiram	Shiney	Malayalam	
1998	Thikkurissi The Golden Miracle	Herself	Malayalam	Documentary
1998	Aattuvela		Malayalam	
1999	Rishivamsham	Drama artist	Malayalam	
2000	Snegithiye	Adv. Soumini	Tamil	
2000	Puraskaaram	Bhargavi	Malayalam	
2001	Achaneyanenikkishtam	Sofia	Malayalam	
2001	Kakkakkuyil	Madhavan's daughter	Malayalam	
2001	Rakshasa Rajavu	Maya	Malayalam	
2001	Kasi	Valli	Tamil	
2002	Aabharanacharthu	Savithrikutty	Malayalam	
2007	Raakilipattu	Adv. Soumini	Malayalam	Shot in 2000; Bilingual with Snegithiye
2011	Again Kasargod Khader Bhai	Latha	Malayalam	Archive footage Cameo

== Television ==
- Sambavami Yuge Yuge (Surya TV) - Serial
- Panam Tharum Padam (Mazhavil Manorama) - Game show
