= No. 20 Madras Mail =

- Poster designed by Gayathri Ashokan
- Directed by: Joshiy
- Screenplay by: Dennis Joseph
- Story by: Harikumar
- Produced by: D. Sasi
- Starring: Mohanlal; Sumalatha; M. G. Soman; Jagadish; Ashokan
- Cinematography: Jayanan Vincent; Anandakuttan; Santosh Sivan (second unit)
- Edited by: K. Sankunny
- Music by: S. P. Venkatesh (score); Ouseppachan (songs)
- Production company: Tharangini Films
- Distributed by: Tharangini Release
- Release date: 16 February 1990
- Running time: 177 minutes
- Country: India
- Language: Malayalam

No. 20 Madras Mail is a 1990 Indian Malayalam-language comedy thriller film directed by Joshiy and written by Dennis Joseph from a story by Harikumar. The film features Mohanlal, Jagadish, Maniyanpilla Raju, M. G. Soman, Ashokan, and Suchitra Murali. The film features Mammooty too, as himself, in an extended cameo appearance.The background score was composed by S. P. Venkatesh while the song was composed by Ouseppachan. The plot follows three youngsters who are embroiled in the murder mystery of a young woman in a train journey from Thiruvananthapuram to Madras. No.20 Madras Mail was released on 16 February 1990 and received positive reviews. Almost half of the film was shot inside a train. Four years later, the film was remade in Hindi as Teesra Kaun by Partho Ghosh.

== Plot ==
The train No.20 Madras Mail to Madras starts from Trivandrum Central railway station. R. K. Nair, a Kollam-based businessman takes the first class coach to Madras with his wife Geetha and daughter Devi from Kollam Junction. Tony Kurishingal, along with his friends Hitchcock Kanjikkuzhi and Kumbalam Hari boards the same coach from Kottayam. Tony is the son of a wealthy businessman, Kurishinkal Kariyachan, Kanjikuzhi is a detective novelist and Hari is a young politician. Three of them are going to Madras to see a test cricket match, a cabaret, and to make attempts to make Kanjikuzhi's novel Vaarikkuzhiyile Kolapathakam a movie. All three are drunkards.From Ernakulam Town station, another passenger Sunil boards the train at the last moment.

After seeing Devi, Tony and friends make several attempts in getting a seat for Tony in the same coach of Devi, with the help of ticket inspector Nadar, but with little success. While doing so, Tony gets into heated arguments with Nair and Sunil, who shares the same coach. Film actor Mammootty himself boards the train from Thrissur and gets into the same coach. Nadar leaves the train at Palakkad after giving company with Tony and gang and the new TTE Chokalingam / Choki assumes duty. Tony and his friends visit Mammootty and become friends with him. Meanwhile, Tony tries to flirt with Devi while she returns from the restroom, which causes Tony to land in trouble with Nair, but on Mammootty's intervention the matter is settled.

In the morning, as the train reaches Madras, Devi is found murdered in the toilet. Suspicion lands on Tony and friends and they run away from the spot in fear. The investigation is carried out by police officer DySP Murthy who learns from Chokalingam that Mammootty had taken photos of Tony and friends while in the train. He gets the photo from him and are publicly displayed. Mammootty helps Tony and friends to return to Kerala secretly as he believes they are innocent.

Back in Kerala, they are confronted by Sunil. Sunil sneaks upon Tony holding a switchblade at the lake where Tony, Hari and Kanjikkuzhi were bathing. Sunil attempts to murder Tony, Hari and Kanjikkuzhi, thinking they murdered Devi. Tony defeats and subdue Sunil in the fight that ensued. Tony orders Sunil to spill information about Devi's killer. Sunil was actually the lover of Devi and both had planned to elope from the train at Erode, but failed as Sunil could not get out off the train in time during the halt. Devi, with the help of the station master takes a taxi to the next station, Salem, and get back to train.

Sunil makes amends with Tony, Hari and Kanjikkuzhi and becomes their new friend. Also, from Sunil, they learn about Sr. Gloria, who tells that Devi gave her a diary before leaving for Madras. After acquiring the diary from the convent, they come to know that Nair is not Devi's father, but only a stepfather and that he killed her father in her childhood. On learning that Nair might be the murderer, Tony calls Nair by phone impersonating Mammootty's voice and says that he has got the diary and blackmails him to give ₹20 lakh in return for the diary. Tony informs Mammootty and convinces him to proceed with the play. Mammootty and Nair meets and agree to fix the deal on the same train on a Wednesday. Mammootty boards the train at Palakkad on which Nair has already booked an entire bogie. He informs that the diary is not present with him and would hand it over at Salem when Tony joins the train.

Nair leaves the train at Erode Junction railway station and goes to Salem station via taxi to find Tony, but Tony and Sunil enter the train in between, they along with Mammootty overpower Nair's henchmen. Meanwhile, Nair reenters the train at Salem Jn. and finds that Tony has already entered. Tony and Mammootty attack Nair and make him confess the truth. Nair reveals that he killed Devi after she caught up the train at Salem, fearing that Devi would inform the police about her father's murder. The next morning, when the train arrives Madras, DySP Murthy, who had already been informed of everything by Hari and Kanjikkuzhi, arrests Nair and his goons.

Tony, Hari, and Kanjikkuzhi has proved their innocence. On another day, while boarding the No.19 Trivandrum Mail to return home, they find Mammootty again in the same train, who tries to leave the train after seeing them, but only to be stopped by Tony and friends who promises a happy and safe journey back home.

== Cast ==
- Mohanlal as Tony Kurishingal
- Mammootty as a fictionalized version of himself (extended cameo appearance)
- Jagadish as Kumbalam Hari, Tony's friend and Politician
- Maniyanpilla Raju as Hitchcock Kanjikkuzhi, Tony's friend and Detective Novelist
- Ashokan as Sunil / Suresh, Tony's friend
- Suchitra as Devi, Sunil's girlfriend
- M. G. Soman as R. K. Nair, Devi's stepfather
- Siddique as Sudeep, Tony's clubmate and Friend
- Sumalatha as Sister Gloria, Devi's teacher
- V. K. Sreeraman as DYSP Moorthy
- Jayabharathi as Geetha, Devi's Mother
- Innocent as Nadar (TTE), Tony's friend
- Jagathy Sreekumar as Chokkalingam / Chokki (TTE), Nadar's friend
- Janardhanan as Adv. Thomas Mathew, R. K. Nair's Friend
- Janagaraj as Murukesan, Hari's Friend
- Jagannatha Varma as Kurishingal Kariyachan, Tony's Father
- Valsala Menon as Mariyamma, Tony's Stepmother
- Santha Devi as Mother Superior
- K. P. A. C. Sunny as Sreedhara Menon, Devi's father
- K. P. A. C. Azeez as Kathiresan, Station Master, Erode Junction railway station
- Shyama as Mollykutty, Tony's Sister
- Kollam Ajith as Goonda
- Thalapathi Dinesh as Goonda
- Vinod Kozhikode as Goonda
- Baby Ambili as Young Devi

Cameo appearances

- Thiagarajan as Himself
- Cochin Haneefa as Himself
- Captain Raju as Himself
- Priyadarshan as Himself
- Rajeev Nath as Himself
- G. Suresh Kumar as Himself

== Production ==
Dennis Joseph got the plot idea from a friend of his named Harikumar, who is also actor Ashokan's brother. Initially, Joshiy and Joseph thought about casting newcomers in the principal roles. However, Joshiy later decided it to be a Mohanlal-starrer. Subsequently, the age of the characters were increased to make them youngsters rather than teenagers; Jagadish and Maniyanpilla Raju were added as Mohanlal's buddies. Some of the scenes were based on Joseph's own experience from his train journeys. Originally, Jagathy Sreekumar was fixed in the role of the actor the youngsters meet on their train journey. But a day before the filming began, Mohanlal suggested to cast Mammootty in the actor's role and to swap Sreekumar to one of the TTE's roles. Joseph and Joshiy liked the idea but was skeptical whether Mammootty would agree to do a supporting role in a film with Mohanlal in the leading role, since mid-1980s both the actors have attained stardom and have been appearing only in equally important roles or otherwise cameos, nevertheless, Joseph asked Mammootty who immediately agreed without hesitation. The interior scenes of the train was shot inside an original moving train to avoid artificial feeling of using sets. For that, they bought a Nilambur–Shoranur route train for rent and drove it to places to and fro for filming.

== Music ==
The film score was composed by S. P. Venkatesh. The single song "Pichakappoonkaavukal" featured in the film was composed by Ouseppachan and sung by M. G. Sreekumar, lyrics were by Shibu Chakravarthy. This song was later reused in the film Husbands in Goa (2012). A. R. Rahman who was then yet to debut as a film composer, did the keyboard and synth programming whereas Vidyasagar assisted Ouseppachan in the recording of the song "Pichakappoonkaavukal". The chorus portions of the song were done by the above three along with the singer M. G. Sreekumar.

Track list
No.	Title	Singer(s)	Length
1.	"Pichakappoomkavukal"	M. G. Sreekumar	3:39
2.	"Charumandasmitham"	M. G. Sreekumar	3:24
3.	"Pichakappoomkavukal"	K. S. Chithra

== Release and reception ==
The film was a commercial success, it ran for over 125 days.
