= Makkal Mahatmyam =

- Poster
- Directed by: Paulson
- Story by: Siddique-Lal; Screenplay: Robin Thirumala Sathyanath
- Produced by: Shamli International
- Starring: Mukesh; Sai Kumar; Innocent; Jagadish; Vaishnavi
- Music by: S. Balakrishnan
- Production company: Shamli International
- Release date: 1992
- Country: India
- Language: Malayalam

Makkal Mahatmyam is a 1992 Malayalam comedy film directed by Paulson, written by Siddique-Lal, and starring Mukesh, Sai Kumar, Innocent, Jagadish, Vaishnavi, K. P. A. C. Lalitha, Zeenath, Sukumari and Suchitra.

== Plot ==
Kuruppumash is married to Kunjulakshmi. They go to the temple to pray for a child. Kurupumash is the headmaster of the public school. One day, Kurupumash comes late with his wife to the school, where the DEO had been waiting for long time. The DEO is initially angered, but becomes sentimental on hearing Kurupumash's childless status, tells him to either get a doctor's checkup or marry another woman who can deliver. Hearing this, Kunjulakshmi, full of guilt, attempts suicide, and makes Kurupumash marry a woman named Saraswathi. Kunjulakshmi gets pregnant and delivers a son. The same time, Saraswathy also pregnant, gives birth to a male child and a female later. But Kunjulakshmi wants Saraswathi to leave their home as she has her own child. Kurupumash does not allow Saraswathi to leave because Saraswathi is also now his wife with child. Rivalry between Kunjulakshmi and Saraswathi starts. Kunjulakshmi stays in the old house and Saraswathi in the nearby house of Kuruppumash.

Now Madhavankuty, son of Kunjulakshmi is grown up, and is going to attend an interview. Krishnankutty, son of Saraswathi, is also attending the same interview. Both of them catch a taxi. They both enter the taxi at the same time ending up in a race up to the interview area. At the interview area again both of them fight and damage the interview area garden. This results in both of them kicked out of the interview. Suma, the sister of Krishnankuty, is studying in college where she is being stalked by a college student. The college student holds the hand of Suma while walking, for which Suma slaps the face of the college student. Madhavankutty sees Suma being attacked by the college student, so interferes ending up in fight. Madhavankutty beats away his goondas, but Krishnankutty scolds Suma and Madhavankutty not to go together. Manikandan is an auto-rickshaw driver, and brings a woman named Radhika for a job interview to Kuruppumash. Due to extreme speed, when he comes across the cycle ridden by Kuruppumash, he loses control. Kuruppumash falls down. Manikandan drops Radhika in Kunjulakshmi's house, but Kuruppumash arrives and refuses the job because of Manikandan. Manikandan introduces Radhika to Saraswathi for recommendation for the job. Manikandan tells Saraswathi that Radhika is from the prominent Valiakoickal family, and if Krishnankutty marries Radhika, the school will be under Saraswathi's custody. Saraswathi agrees. Subadhramma, the mother of Radhika starts to live in a rented house with Radhika. Manikandan tells Kunjulakshmi the same as he told Saraswathi, and she agrees. So next day, Madhavankutty goes to Radhika's house in Manikandan's auto. Subadhramma suddenly has a chest pain, falls unconscious, and gets admitted in hospital by Madhavankutty. Radhika is dropped at hospital by Krishnankutty he donates blood.

In the hospital, Madhavankutty waits a long time to meet Radhika alone and tells her Krishnankutty has an illness which cannot be cured. This annoys Krishnankutty and he quarrels with Madhavankutty at home.

Madhavankutty and Krishnankutty become rivals to marry Radhika. Madhavankutty gives 40000 rupees to Subradhamma to please her and also to give Kuruppumash to get marriage expense for Suma. Radhika's job gets confirmed if a teacher named Pisharody Mash retires from the school six months early. However, Krishnankutty buys alcohol for him and changes his mind from retiring early. For this, Madhavankuty tries to persuade Pisharody Mash along with Manikandan and gives him a lift in the auto-rickshaw. Though Pisharody Mash is drunk, he agrees to resign early and dies in the autorickshaw when he was about to come out. People falsely accuse Madhavankutty and Manikandan of murder. Suma hides them in the attic of Krishnankutty's house. Krishnankutty sees Suma serving them food and shuts the door to the attic, ending in the arrest of both Manikandan and Madhavankutty. A few days later, the autopsy report tells it was a heart attack. Both Manikandan and Madhavankuty are now considered innocent. Kunjulakshmi calls giving wrong information and cancels the marriage for Suma. For this, Krishnankutty now arranges to marry Suma with her college enemy whom she beat once for catching her hand and was beaten by Madhavankutty for attacking her in the road. Madhavankutty learns of this. On the marriage day, Madhavankutty and Radhika are supposed to get married and on the other side, Suma and her college foe. Madhavankutty interferes and protests Suma's marriage with a wrong fellow. This ends in a fight between Madhavankutty and Krishnankutty on a paddy field. Only Manikandan tries to stop the fight, Kuruppumash also tries to stop the fight, but Krishnankutty accidentally cuts his forehead, causing Kuruppumash to fall unconscious due to severe bleeding. Kuruppuumash gets admitted in hospital, meanwhile Madhavankutty, Krishnankutty, Kunjulakshmi and Saraswathi all become friends. The film ends with the doctor saying that Kuruppumash may not get his memory back, but Kuruppumash closes one eye at Manikandan while the vehicle takes away from the hospital, and revealing that Kurupumash was acting as though he had lost memory.

== Cast ==
- Mukesh as Madhavankutty
- Sai Kumar as Krishnankutty
- Innocent as Mullethu Balakrishna Kuruppu aka Kuruppu Maash
- Jagadish as Manikantan, Madhavankutty's friend and an auto-rickshaw driver
- Vaishnavi as Radhika
- K. P. A. C. Lalitha as Kunjulakshmi Teacher, Kuruppu Maash's first wife and Madhavankutty's mother
- Zeenath as Saraswathi Amma, Kuruppu Maash's second wife and Krishnankutty's mother
- Sukumari as Subhadramma
- Suchitra as Ammu, Krishnankutty's sister
- Mamukkoya as Andru, school peon
- Krishnan Kutty Nair as Pisharodi Mash
- Vijayaraghavan as Police Inspector
- Ajith Chandran
