= Again Kasargod Khader Bhai =

- Film poster
- Directed by: Thulasidas
- Written by: Kaloor Dennis
- Story by: Kalabhavan Ansar
- Produced by: Milan Jaleel
- Starring: Jagadish; Ashokan; Baiju; Gautham Krishn
- Cinematography: Utpal V Nayanar
- Edited by: Mohanan P C
- Music by: Ratheesh Vegha
- Distributed by: Galaxy Films
- Release date: 3 December 2010
- Country: India
- Language: Malayalam

Again Kasargod Khader Bhai is a 2010 Indian Malayalam-language film directed by Thulasidas, starring Jagadish, Ashokan, Baiju, Innocent and Gautham Krishn. The film is a sequel to the films Mimics Parade (1991) and Kasargod Khader Bhai (1992).

== Plot ==
The artists of Kaladarshana, led by Unni reunites to celebrate the sixtieth birthday of founder Fr. Tharakkandam. There they get an invitation to perform a Mimics programme at Viyyoor central jail. Kasargod Khader Bhai's son Kasim Bhai is currently in the same jail and he has vengeance on Kaladarshana troop who were behind his arrest. He attacks them during the programme. The next day Kasim Bhai is found murdered. The suspicion falls on the Kaladarshana team. The unfolding of the murder mystery forms the rest of the story.

== Cast ==
- Jagadish as Unni
- Ashokan as Jimmy
- Baiju as Manoj
- Gautham Krishn as Bekal Police Station CI Faisal Mohammad
- Innocent as Fr. Francis Tharakkandam
- Salim Kumar as Kaalam
- Bijukuttan as Kochanty
- Dharmajan as Raju
- Babu Antony as Kasargod Kasim Bhai
- Radha Varma as Raziya / Anna Kareena
- Suraj Venjaramood as Kasaragod Police Station SI Mithun Chakravarthy (MC)
- Siddique as Sabu (Voice Only)
- Narayanankutty as Bekal Police Station ASI B.S Anthony
- Kottayam Nazeer as Bekal Police Station SI Manmadha Rajan
- Thesni Khan as Shittymol
- Priyanka Anoop as Bekal Police Station PC Thankamma
- Kollam Thulasi as Advocate Vinod Swaminathan
- Manju Satheesh as Nancy, Jimmy's wife
- Suresh Krishna as Ameer Ajmal
- Adithya Menon as Ali Khan
- Sadiq as Kannur Central Jail Jail Superintendent Joseph Palathingal (Josekutty)
- Shammi Thilakan as Kasaragod DYSP Siju Jose
- Shivaji Guruvayoor as Kasaragod SP Johnson Leen IPS
- Kalabhavan Haneef as mimicry artist / Beggar
- Dora Jose as crew member
- Alummoodan as Kasargod Khader Bhai (Photo Archieve)
