= Ezhupunna Tharakan =

- Directed by: P. G. Viswambharan
- Written by: Kaloor Dennis
- Produced by: George P. Joseph
- Starring: Mammootty; Madhu; Jagadish; Namrata
- Cinematography: Sanjeev Shankar
- Edited by: A. Sreekar Prasad
- Music by: Vidyasagar
- Distributed by: Leo Group Of Companies
- Release date: 3 April 1999
- Country: India
- Language: Malayalam

Ezhupunna Tharakan is a 1999 Malayalam action drama film directed by P. G. Viswambharan. It features Mammootty,Madhu, Jagadish, and Namrata Shirodkar in the lead roles. This was Shirodkar's first & only Malayalam film.

== Cast ==
- Mammootty as Ezhupunna Sunny Tharakan
- Madhu as Ezhuppuna Outha Tharakan, Sunny's father
- Jagadish as Muhammad Ali, Sunny's friend
- Namrata Shirodkar as Ashwathy Varma, Sunny's love interest and turuned into wife
- Sangeetha as Aiswarya Gowda
- Captain Raju as Ezhupunna Chacko Tharakan
- K.P.A.C. Sunny as Ezhupunna Mathew Tharakan
- Rajan P. Dev as Kumbanadan Lazar
- Vijayakumar as Ezhupunna Baby Tharakan, Sunny's Younger brother
- Kaviyoor Ponnamma as Kunjannamma, Sunny's mother
- Praveena as Rani, Sunny's sister
- Zainuddin as Pushkaran
- Sadiq as Ajayan
- Kozhikode Narayanan Nair as Paliyankkara Valiya Thampuran
- Baiju Ezhupunna as Sathyanathan, Paliyankars Valiya Thampuran's nephew
- V. K. Sreeraman as Ramabhadran
- T. P. Madhavan as Justice Mahadevan
- Jagannatha Varma as Father Bernard
- Spadikam George as Padmanabhan
- Paravur Ramachandran as Rajasekharan
- Rizabawa as DYSP Gouri nandana Varma
- Chandni Shaju as Leena Lazer
- Manka Mahesh as Mary Chacko
- Professor Aliyar as Advocate Vasudevan Nair
- Vimal Raj as Gunda
- Shammi Thilakan as SP Joseph Arakkal
- Bindu Ramakrishnan in cameo appearance
- Jayabharathi as Aswathy's mother

== Songs ==
The movie has five songs which were composed by Vidyasagar. The lyrics were written by Gireesh Puthenchery.

Song	Singers
"Mele Vinnil"	Srinivas
"Mele Vinnil"	K. S. Chithra
"Minnum Nilave"	Sujatha Mohan, K. J. Yesudas
"Thekkan Katte"	Biju Narayanan, M. G. Sreekumar, Unni Menon, Radhika Thilak, Sujatha Mohan, C. O. Anto
"Thekku Thekku"	K. J. Yesudas
"Enne Maranno Ponne"	K. J. Yesudas, Sujatha Mohan

== Reception ==
A critic from Deccan Herald wrote that the film was "Time-pass stuff".
