= Nayam Vyakthamakkunnu =

- Poster
- Directed by: Balachandra Menon
- Written by: Balachandra Menon
- Screenplay by: Balachandra Menon
- Produced by: R. Mohan
- Starring: Mammootty; Shanthi Krishna
- Cinematography: S. Sivaram
- Edited by: Sreekumar
- Music by: Johnson
- Production company: GoodKnight Films
- Distributed by: Manorajyam Release
- Release date: 28 March 1991
- Country: India
- Language: Malayalam

Nayam Vyakthamakkunnu (English: Making Your Stand Clear) is a 1991 Indian Malayalam film, directed by Balachandra Menon and produced by R. Mohan. The film stars Mammootty and Shanthi Krishna in the lead roles. The film has musical score by Johnson. The movie is based on the life of late Kerala Legislative assembly speaker G. Karthikeyan.

== Plot ==
P. Sukumaran is an up-and-coming youth wing leader of a minor party in the ruling coalition. His wife, Valsala is a college lecturer who takes care of family life, including their school-going son, Unni. She grows increasingly tired of Sukumaran's lack of attention to her and the family. Sukumaran, meanwhile, is taken advantage of by party leadership, who burden him with nasty tasks while his junior co-workers accept bribes in his name. They also invade his family's privacy and finances.

Sukumaran leads a picket at the Secretariat and gets injured from the police's lathi charge. He also goes on a hunger strike for the party. When the hunger strike drags on for more than 5 days, Valsala storms the party meeting and forces the party leadership to end the hunger strike. Sukumaran borrowed money from multiple people who harass Valasala at college. Sukumaran also pawned off most of Valsala's jewellery. Valsala also learns that Sukumaran hid her much awaited transfer order for selfish reasons. This prompts Valsala to leave Sukumaran for her parents' house.

As soon as Valsala leaves home, the news arrives that Sukumaran has been appointed as the new minister. Sukumaran, sworn in as minister, enforces strict control over his personal staff, dismissing Kurudamannil Sasi for corruption immediately. Sukumaran is further angered by a bogus newspaper interview of Valsala. Valsala visits the ministerial home, but Sukumaran refuses to meet her. Valsala leaves Sukumaran and takes charge in the new college.

Because Sukumaran misses Valsala, he visits places where he spent time with her. The ministerial staff gets worried about his strange behavior. Valsala tries to send a letter to Sukumaran, but Sasi destroys the letter. In the climax, Sukumaran visits Valsala's college during their golden jubilee celebrations. As Valsala gives the inaugural speech and Sukumaran's son hands him the bouquet, all eyes are turned to Sukumaran. Defying all expectations, Sukumaran confesses how the absence of his family has disrupted his life and how it has prevented him from doing his best as a minister. He proudly explains to everyone how his wife was his backbone during his initial days in politics and confesses how he has let his family down. As he is about to apologize to Valsala in public, he is prevented from doing so by an emotional Valsala. The movie ends with Sukumaran and Valsala happily walking down the dias with their son in hand.

== Cast ==
- Mammootty as P. Sukumaran, a.k.a. P. S.
- Shanthi Krishna as Valsala Sukumaran, a.k.a. Vava
- Jagadish as Kurudamannil Sasi
- Adoor Bhavani as Bhageerathi Amma
- Karamana Janardanan Nair
- A. C. Zainuddin as Gunman Sekhar
- Sankaradi as Sankaranarayanan Thampi
- Abi as Stephen
- Kalabhavan Rahman
- Janardanan as Chackochan
- K.P.A.C. Sunny as Sadasivan
- K. P. Ummer
- V. K. Sreeraman
- Kundara Johnny
- Kaladi Omana
- Lalitha Sree
- K. B. Ganesh Kumar
- Sulakshana
- Thikkurissy Sukumaran Nair as Chief Minister of Kerala
- Suchitra as Rosili
- Valsala Menon as College Principal
- Poojappura Radhakrishnan
- Vishnu Ravee

== Soundtrack ==
The music was composed by Johnson.

No.	Song	Singers	Lyrics	Length (m:ss)
1	"Paadoo Thalipoo"	Sujatha Mohan, G. Venugopal	Kaithapram	
