= Kavadiyattam =

- Directed by: Aniyan
- Screenplay by: B. Sreeraj
- Story by: Shan sab (Sabu Panicker)
- Produced by: M. M. Pappachan
- Starring: Jayaram; Siddique; Jagathy Sreekumar; Suchitra; Sindhuja
- Cinematography: Anandakuttan
- Edited by: G. Murali
- Music by: Mohan Sithara
- Production company: Zeon movies
- Distributed by: Zeon Movies
- Release date: March 12, 1993
- Country: India
- Language: Malayalam

Kavadiyattam is a 1993 Indian Malayalam-language comedy film directed by Aniyan and screen play by B. Sreeraj and story by Shansab (Sabu Panicker). The film stars Jayaram, Siddique, Jagathy Sreekumar, Suchitra and Sindhuja in the lead roles. The film has a musical score by Mohan Sithara and lyrics by O. N. V. Kurup.

== Plot ==
Unni is in the army, but does not wish to stay there. He feigns a mental illness to get discharged, but has to continue to put on the show in front of his family and villagers when he reaches back home.

== Cast ==
- Jayaram as Unni
- Jagathy Sreekumar as Pazhamkanji Velappan
- Siddique as PC Keshava Kuruppu
- Sindhuja as Meenu
- Suchitra as Thankamani
- Kalpana as Dolly
- Kaviyoor Ponnamma as Seethalakshmi
- Mamukkoya as Koya
- Zainuddin as Nariaparampil Mathukutty
- Babu Namboothiri as Raman Nair
- Krishnankutty Nair as Valiya Kuruppu
- Usharani as Kuruppu's wife
- Indrans as Tea Shop Employee
- Narendra Prasad as Seethalakshmi's husband
- N. L. Balakrishnan as neighbour of Seethalakshmi
- Babu Joseph (K J Thomas) as Velappan's money lender
- Joby A S
- Vettoor Purushan
- E. A. Rajendran

Boban Samuel

== Music ==
- "Varthingal Pulkannadi" - K. J. Yesudas
- "Thengin Melkeranatharanu" - C. C. Anto
- "Thengin Melkeranatharanu" - C. C. Anto
- "Kattuthulli Kayalolam" - K. J. Yesudas, S. Janaki
