= Muhoorthangal =

- Directed by: P. M. Benny
- Written by: P. Ayyaneth; Benny (dialogues)
- Screenplay by: Benny
- Starring: Srividya; KPAC Sunny; M. G. Soman; Rani Chandra
- Cinematography: Shaji N. Karun
- Edited by: G. Venkittaraman
- Music by: M. K. Arjunan
- Production company: People Combines
- Distributed by: People Combines
- Release date: 7 October 1977
- Country: India
- Language: Malayalam

Muhoorthangal is a 1977 Indian Malayalam film, directed by P. M. Benny. The film stars Srividya, KPAC Sunny, M. G. Soman and Rani Chandra in the lead roles. The film has musical score by M. K. Arjunan.

== Cast ==
- Srividya
- KPAC Sunny
- M. G. Soman
- Rani Chandra
- Sudheer

== Soundtrack ==
The music was composed by M. K. Arjunan and the lyrics were written by ONV Kurup.

No.	Song	Singers	Lyrics	Length (m:ss)
1	"Muthum Pavizhavum"	Vani Jairam	O. N. V. Kurup	
2	"Nenmeni Vaakappoo"	K. J. Yesudas, Chorus	O. N. V. Kurup	
3	"Pakalkkili Parannu Poy"	S. Janaki	O. N. V. Kurup	
4	"Sarovaram Poo Choodi"	K. J. Yesudas	O. N. V. Kurup	
