= Kasarkode Khaderbai =

1992 Indian film

Kasaragod Khader Bhai
- Directed by: Thulasidas
- Screenplay by: Kaloor Dennis
- Story by: Kalabhavan Ansar
- Produced by: Changanassery Basheer
- Starring: Jagadish; Siddique; Suchitra; Sunitha; Sai Kumar; Ashokan; Zainuddin; Baiju; Ansar Kalabhavan; Innocent; Mala Aravindan; Alummoodan; Babu Antony
- Cinematography: Saloo George
- Edited by: G. Murali
- Music by: Johnson
- Production company: Simple Productions
- Release date: 30 April 1992
- Running time: 151 minutes
- Country: India
- Language: Malayalam

Kasaragod Khader Bhai is a 1992 Indian Malayalam-language comedy film directed by Thulasidasand written by Kaloor Dennis from a story by Kalabhavan Ansar. The movie features Alummoodan in the titular role as the lead antagonist and stars Jagadish, Siddique, Suchitra and Sunitha in the lead roles with Sai Kumar, Ashokan, Zainuddin, Baiju, Ansar Kalabhavan Innocent, Mala Aravindan, Babu Antony in supporting roles. The film is a sequel to 1991 film Mimics Parade. In 2010, it spawned a sequel titled Again Kasargod Khader Bhai.

== Plot ==
The film is about how Kasargod Khader Bhai and his son Kasim Bhai, a criminal who attempts to murder people in his reach tries to take revenge on the mimicry artists who send Khader Bhai to jail.

== Cast ==
- Jagadish as Unni
- Siddique as Sabu
- Suchitra as Latha
- Sunitha as Sandhya Cheriyan
- Sai Kumar as Sreenivasa Menon
- Ashokan as Jimmy
- Zainuddin as Nizam
- Baiju as Manoj
- Ansar Kalabhavan as Anwar
- Kalabhavan Abi as Sakaria
- K. B. Ganesh Kumar
- Idavela Babu
- Mahesh as Jayan
- Innocent as Fr. Francis Tharakkandam
- Mala Aravindan as Mammootty
- Alummoodan as Kasargod Khader Bhai
- Babu Antony as Kasim Bhai (Voice Dubbing by Prof. Aliyar)
- Kalabhavan Haneef as mimicry artist
- Praseetha Menon as Female mimicry artist
- Subair as Police Officer
- Shankaradi as Pachalam Pappachan
- Philomina as Thandamma
- Mohanraj as Khader Bhai's right hand
- Sivaji as Frederik Cherian, Sandhya's brother
- Sadiq as Stephen Cherian, Sandhya's brother
- Prathapachandran as Cherian, Sandhya's father
- Kanakalatha as Latha's mother

== Soundtrack ==
Music: Johnson, Lyrics: Bichu Thirumala.

- Neelakkurkkan - Jolly Abraham, Krishnachandran, Sujatha Mohan, Johnson, C. O. Anto, Natesh Shankar
