= Varaphalam =

- Directed by: Thaha
- Written by: B. Jayachandran
- Produced by: Risana Arts
- Starring: Sreenivasan; Mukesh; Thilakan; Maathu; Anju; Jagathy Sreekumar
- Cinematography: Saloo George
- Edited by: G. Venkitaraman
- Music by: S. P. Venkatesh (film score); Mohan Sitara (songs)
- Production company: Risana Arts
- Distributed by: Pratheeksha Pictures
- Release date: 1994
- Country: India
- Language: Malayalam

Varaphalam (transl. Weekly horoscope) is a 1994 Indian Malayalam-language comedy-drama film directed by Thaha and written by B. Jayachandran, starring Sreenivasan and Mukesh in the lead roles.

== Plot ==
The story is about Sreedharan Nair and his two sons, one of them blind, Unni, and the other one deaf, Balan. The story takes a turn when the sons marry, and their in-laws try to steal the family money. Krishnankutty is a clever but honest caretaker for the deaf and blind siblings, who is constantly at odds with their in-laws. Being astute he senses the actual intentions of the in-laws and warns the brothers. His run-ins with the in-laws give some genuine comic moments. The in laws start wading into forbidden territory in their quest to grab money finally, the patriarch, Sreedharan Nair, steps in and carries out the burden of sorting things out.

== Cast ==
- Sreenivasan as Unni
- Mukesh as Balan
- Thilakan as Sreedharan Nair (Father of Unni and Balan)
- Maathu as Balan's wife (Anjali)
- Anju as Unni's wife (Geetha)
- Jagathy Sreekumar as Krishnankutty
- Paravoor Bharathan as Pillai Chettan
- Karamana Janardanan Nair as Geetha's father
- Janardhanan as Govindankutty
- Mamukkoya as broker Hamsa
- Meena as Geetha's mother
- Siddique as Gopi/Drama Artist (Cameo Appearance)
- Sukumari as Kalyanikutty/Drama Artist Rosy (Cameo Appearance)
- Zeenath as Govindankutty's Wife
- K. P. A. C. Sunny as Sahadevan
- Mala Aravindan as Advocate Arunkumar
- Indrans as Auto Driver
- Zainuddin
- Kalasala Babu
- Elias Babu as Man at Bus stop
- Abu Salim
