= Gopura Vasalile =

1991 film by Priyadarshan

- Poster
- Directed by: Priyadarshan
- Screenplay by: Priyadarshan
- Dialogue by: Gokula Krishnan
- Story by: Sreenivasan
- Produced by: M. K. Thamizharasu
- Starring: Karthik; Bhanupriya; Suchitra
- Cinematography: P. C. Sreeram
- Edited by: N. Gopalakrishnan
- Music by: Ilaiyaraaja
- Production company: Arul Nithi Films
- Release date: March 22, 1991
- Country: India
- Language: Tamil

Gopura Vasalile (/ɡoʊpʊrə vɑːsəlileɪ/ transl. At the doorstep of the gopuram) is a 1991 Indian Tamil-language romantic black comedy film directed by Priyadarshan, starring Karthik and Bhanupriya. It relies on various subplots from the Malayalam film Pavam Pavam Rajakumaran (1990) and the Hindi film Chashme Buddoor (1981). The film was released on 22 March 1991, and ran for more than 100 days in many theatres, thus becoming a commercial success.

== Plot ==
Manohar (Karthik) is a schoolteacher in a local town. He is a bachelor living along with his friends (Nassar, Junior Balaiah, Charle). Manohar has had a troubled love life, having lost his lover Kasthuri (Suchitra) in a car accident. His friends are wastrels who roam about the town, flirting with the local girls. During one such dalliance with an army officer's (V. K. Ramasamy) daughter Kalyani (Bhanupriya), they are put behind bars for a few days. Manohar also gets peeved with their uncouth behavior and reprimands them for it. Humiliated, the friends decide to wreak their revenge on Manohar. They collude with Pethaperumal (Janagaraj), a clerk in a local bank, and attempt to trick Manohar into believing that Kalyani is in love with him. A few anonymous letters later, the plan comes out successful.

In the meantime, during the course of a few accidental events, Manohar comes across to Kalyani as a brave and resourceful hero. Impressed, she seeks his hand in marriage through the help of her father. This sudden development takes his scheming friends aback. They cook up evidences to convince Manohar that Kalyani is a prostitute. The gullible Manohar believes the subterfuge and cancels the plans of marriage. Despondent after the twin love failures in his life, Manohar attempts suicide in a hotel. Thinking that he is dead, the friends flee the town to avoid police confrontations. It is finally revealed to the viewers that Manohar was rescued by the police later and had reunited with Kalyani, after the foul play was decoded. Manohar pardons the friends as they had played some role in developing a love with his wife and invites them to a banquet at his new house atop a hill.

== Cast ==
- Karthik as Manohar
- Bhanupriya as Kalyani
- Suchitra as Kasthuri
- Nassar as Manohar's friend
- Janagaraj as Pethaperumal
- Charle as Manohar's friend
- Junior Balaiah as Manohar's friend
- V. K. Ramasamy as Kalyani's father
- Nagesh
- Sukumari as Manohar's mother
- Poornam Viswanathan
- Mohanlal as the accordionist in the song "Keladi En" (cameo appearance)
- Arulnithi

== Production ==
Malayalam director Priyadarshan was to have made his Tamil debut with the film Chinnamanikkuyile, which never saw a theatrical release. As a result, Gopura Vasalile became his Tamil debut. It is also the first appearance of Malayalam actor Mohanlal in a Tamil film.

== Soundtrack ==
The soundtrack was composed by Ilaiyaraaja. The song "Kadhal Kavithaigal" is set to the raga Mayamalavagowla, "Naadam Ezhundadadi" is set to Shree ranjani, and "Thalattum Poongkaatru" is set to Simhendramadhyamam.

Song	Singers	Lyrics
"Kadhal Kavithaigal"	S. P. Balasubrahmanyam, K. S. Chithra	Piraisoodan
"Keladi En"	S. P. Balasubrahmanyam	Piraisoodan
"Naadam Ezhundadadi"	S. Janaki, K. J. Yesudas	Piraisoodan
"Priyasakhi"	Mano, S. Janaki	Vaali
"Dhevadhai Pol"	Deepan Chakravarthy, Mano, Malaysia Vasudevan, S. N. Surendar	Vaali
"Thalattum Poongkaatru"	S. Janaki	Vaali

== Critical reception ==
Sundarji of Kalki praised the music, cinematography and acting of Karthik and Janagaraj, but felt Bhanupriya did not get much scope to act.

== Bibliography ==
- Sundararaman (2007) [2005]. Raga Chintamani: A Guide to Carnatic Ragas Through Tamil Film Music (2nd ed.). Pichhamal Chintamani. OCLC 295034757.
