= Congratulations Miss Anitha Menon =

- Directed by: Thulasidas
- Screenplay by: Kaloor Dennis
- Story by: Jokkuttan
- Produced by: Kurian Alex
- Starring: Siddique; Saikumar; Leena Nair; Zainuddin
- Cinematography: Tony
- Edited by: G. Murali
- Music by: K J Joy
- Production company: Palakunnel Films
- Distributed by: Remya & Devi Release
- Release date: 1992
- Country: India
- Language: Malayalam

Congratulations Miss Anitha Menon is a 1992 family drama Malayalam film directed by Thulasidas. The film was produced by Kurian Alex under the banner of Palakunnel Films. It stars Siddique, Kalabhavan Zainuddin, Saikumar in the lead roles.

== Plot ==
Prakash Menon, a successful but workaholic businessman who neglects his beautiful and devoted wife Anitha Menon, grows suspicious of her after he receives an anonymous letter that indicates that she has an illicit relationship with another man. He soon finds out that Anitha leaves home in her car regularly to unknown locations and even lies about where she goes to him.

Sudheer Kumar is an unemployed young man who tends to lose jobs due to his lack of punctuality. Having received an appointment letter from Prakash Menon's company, he arrives at the office with swag. but is rejected by Prakash for being late. As Sudheer lingers around in town, staying with his friend Hamza, trying to impress Prakash with his insufferable antics to win back his job, Prakash gets the idea of using him to spy on his wife. As a precondition to win back his job, Prakash demands that Sudheer clandestinely enquire the whereabouts of Anitha, on the pretext of a matrimonial proposal for one of his friends, hiding the fact that she is his wife. Sudheer enthusiastically undertakes the job of tailing Anitha as she moves around in her Maruti car in town, but soon naturally falls in love with the beautiful Anitha under the impression that she is unmarried. Intending to thwart Prakash's friend's marriage proposals with her, Sudheer reports fabricated stories of Anitha's feisty affair with a certain young man (imagining himself in the role). Prakash is naturally devastated, and is forced to keep Sudheer under his payroll in order to find out the whereabouts of this unknown lover.

In a twist, Sudheer gets the shock of his life when he is about to confront Anitha with his proposal but instead witnesses her meeting an unknown young man at his home. Suspicious that she is actually having an affair like he fabricated, he follows her to an orphanage, to discover that she regularly meets a little girl there who calls her mommy and waits for daddy to arrive. Devastated by the blow to his exclusive concept of a partner, Sudheer decides to confront Anitha at her home. As he digs up her address tracing the car number and arrives at her home, he gets the second shock of his life when he sees a photo revealing that Anitha is actually Prakash's wife. Realising that Prakash has been using him to spy on his own wife in the pretext of a friend's matrimonial enquiry, Sudheer gets drunk and spills the beans on his wife's affair in front of Prakash, who is naturally devastated.

The story is brought to track when SI Rajan Joseph, a friend of Prakash come into the scene and decides to get to the root of the whole issue. Observing rightly that the anonymous letter could have been written by any jealous competitor of Prakash, he decides to investigates the reports of Sudheer on the infidelity of Anitha. As Rajan Joseph and Sudheer arrive at the orphanage and confront the vicar in charge, it is revealed that contrary to anything that was supposed earlier, the child that ANitha comes to visit regularly is not Anitha's but a child that Prakash had fathered with a father's friend's daughter Seetha. Seetha was a bubbly young girl devoted to Prakash's father Sankara Menon and it had transpired once that Prakash impregnated Seetha in the heat of a moment. When Sankara Menon realises that she is pregnant, he accepts her as his daughter-in-law and arranges for her delivery, but Seetha dies delivering a baby girl Anu. Prakash is unaware that he even fathered a child with Seetha as he was in London and Sankara Menon never informed him once Seetha died. Instead, Sankara Menon reveals everything to a devoted Anitha who was earlier betrothed to Prakash, and with her happy consent, proceeds with Prakash's wedding with Anitha, planning to keep Anu's existence a secret from him at least until the birth of a child with Anitha. It was in order to conceal this truth from Prakash that Anitha had to resort to move around lying to her husband to meet Anu at the orphanage.

At this juncture, Franklin, a friend-turned-foe of Prakash spills the beans on Anitha having a child in an orphanage. This happens to be the last straw for Prakash who confronts Anitha violently and is about to throw her out of his house, when SI Rajan Joseph promptly interferes and reveals the truth to Prakash. Prakash and Anita reconcile after learning the truth and decide to bring Anu home.

Determined to seize control of Prakash's business, Franklin and his cronies resort to threats against Anu and the children of the orphanage. However, their plans are thwarted when Sudheer and Rajan Joseph step in, defeat the villains, and rescue Anu. Deeply thankful for their bravery, Prakash rewards Sudheer with a job at his company.

== Cast ==
- Siddique as Sudheer Kumar
- Saikumar as Prakash
- Leena Nair as Anitha Menon
- Zainuddin as Hamsa
- Jagadish as Inspector Rajan Joseph (Special Appearance)
- Rizabawa as Franklin
- Mamukkoya as Pappan
- Mala Aravindan as Achu
- M. G. Soman as
- Philomina as Kalyaniamma
