= Mimics Parade =

- Poster
- Directed by: Thulasidas
- Screenplay by: Kaloor Dennis
- Story by: Kalabhavan Ansar
- Produced by: Changanassery Basheer
- Starring: Siddique; Jagadish; Sunitha; Suchitra; Ashokan; Zainuddin; Baiju; Ansar Kalabhavan; Innocent; Mala Aravindan
- Cinematography: Saloo George
- Edited by: G. Murali
- Music by: Johnson
- Production company: Simple Productions
- Release date: 25 June 1991
- Country: India
- Language: Malayalam

Mimics Parade is a 1991 Indian Malayalam-language comedy film directed by Thulasidas and written by Kaloor Dennis from a story by Kalabhavan Ansar. The film stars Siddique, Jagadish, Sunitha, Suchitra, Ashokan, Zainuddin, Baiju, and Ansar Kalabhavan in the lead roles. The film has two sequels, Kasargod Khader Bhai (1992) and Again Kasargod Khader Bhai (2010).

== Cast ==
- Siddique as Sabu
- Jagadish as Unni
- Sunitha as Sandhya Cherian
- Suchitra as Latha
- Ashokan as Jimmy
- Zainuddin as Nissam
- Baiju as Manoj
- Ansar Kalabhavan as Anwar
- Innocent as Fr. Francis Tharakkandam
- Mala Aravindan as Mammootty
- Alummoodan as Kasargod Khader Bhai
- Philomina as Thandamma
- Shivaji as Frederick Cherian, Sandhya's elder brother
- Sadiq as Stephen Cherian, Sandhya's second elder brother
- Prathapachandran as Cherian, Sandhya's father
- Mohanraj as Hakkim, Khader Bhai's right hand
- Thesni Khan as Dance teacher

== Soundtrack ==
The film's soundtrack contains 2 songs, both composed by Johnson and lyrics by Bichu Thirumala.

#	Title	Singer(s)
1	"Chellakkaattin Pallitheril"	Unni Menon, K. S. Chitra
2	"Nakshathram Minnunna"	Unni Menon, Krishnachandran
