= My Dear Muthachan =

- Directed by: Sathyan Anthikad
- Written by: Sreenivasan
- Produced by: Joy Thomas
- Starring: Thilakan; Madhurima Narla; Jayaram; Jomol
- Cinematography: Vipin Mohan
- Edited by: K. Rajagopal
- Music by: Johnson
- Production company: Jubilee Productions
- Distributed by: Jubilee Productions
- Release date: 1992
- Country: India
- Language: Malayalam

My Dear Muthachan (transl. My Dear Grandfather) is a 1992 Indian Malayalam-language film written by Sreenivasan and directed by Sathyan Anthikad and produced by Joy Thomas. It stars Thilakan, Madhurima Narla, Baby Jomol, Baby Renju and Master Tarun in lead roles, and Murali, Sreenivasan, Innocent, Urvashi, K.P.A.C. Lalitha, Jayaram and Philomina in major supporting roles.

== Plot ==
Meera has three younger siblings; they lost their parents recently and are left with no clue on how to run their business. All their relatives and friends start living with them, exploiting their wealth and making their life difficult. So they hire a person to act as their long lost grandfather in order to solve their personal problems. How this person resolves the issues and unravels the secret behind their parents' death forms the crux of the story.

== Cast ==
- Thilakan as Parameswaran / Major K. K. Menon
- Jayaram as Parthasarathi
- Madhurima Narla as Meera
- Baby Jomol as Maya
- Master Tarun as Manu
- Baby Renju as Manju
- Murali as Kuriachan, GM of the company
- Innocent as Sub Inspector K. P. Adiyodi
- Sreenivasan as Dinakaran / Babu Raj/Sebastain
- Janardhanan as Adv. Ananthan Nambiyar
- Urvashi as Clara
- K.P.A.C. Lalitha as Shantha
- Mammukoya as Punnoose
- Thesni Khan
- Devan as Mohan Das
- Geetha as Sree Devi
- Philomina as Kunjamma
- Sukumari as Parthasarathi's Mother
- Oduvil Unnikrishnan as Factory Worker
- Jose Pellissery as Lawyer at the courthouse
- Kalabhavan Haneef as Postman

== Soundtrack ==
The film's soundtrack contains 3 songs, all composed by Johnson and Lyrics by Bichu Thirumala.

#	Title	Singer(s)
1	"Cheppadikkaaranalla"	C. O. Anto, K. S. Chitra, Minmini, Jancy
2	"Raathri Than Kaikalil"	K. S. Chitra, Chorus
3	"Randu Poovithal Chundil Virinju"	K. J. Yesudas
