= Mahazar =

Mahassar
- Directed by: C. P. Vijayakumar
- Music by: Raveendran
- Release date: 1991
- Country: India
- Language: Malayalam

Mahassar is a 1991 Indian Malayalam film, directed by C. P. Vijayakumar. The film has musical score by Raveendran.

== Cast ==
- Sukumaran as M. G. Panikkar
- M. G. Soman as Venugopal
- KPAC Sunny as Judge
- Mala Aravindan as Shivadasan
- Raghu as Suresh
- Abhilasha as Shari
- Bobby Kottarakkara as Babu

== Soundtrack ==
The music was composed by Raveendran and the lyrics were written by Hari Kudappanakkunnu.

No.	Song	Singers	Lyrics	Length (m:ss)
1	"Aadippaadinadakkunna"	K. S. Chithra	Hari Kudappanakkunnu	
2	"Etho kilinaadamen Karalil"	K. J. Yesudas	Hari Kudappanakkunnu	
3	"Venchandanamo Thoomanjo"	K. J. Yesudas	Hari Kudappanakkunnu	
