= Kallan Kappalil Thanne =

- VCD cover
- Directed by: Prasanth
- Screenplay by: Kaloor Dennis
- Story by: Harikumar
- Produced by: P. J. Thomas Koratty
- Starring: Jagadish; Siddique
- Cinematography: Ravi K. Chandran
- Edited by: G. Murali
- Music by: Mohan Sithara
- Production company: Nice Movies
- Distributed by: Ramya Movies
- Release date: 1992
- Country: India
- Language: Malayalam

Kallan Kappalil Thanne is a 1992 Indian Malayalam film directed by Prasanth. The film stars Jagadish, Siddique, Maathu, Suchitra and Poojappura Ravi in the lead roles.

== Plot ==
Murali is a pharmaceutical representative who is in love with Gayathri. He lives in a room above a restaurant owned by Gayathri's father, a Tamil man who owns a teashop named Swami. Jose and Preman are Murali's friends who come to stay with Murali in his room. It provokes Swami, the owner of the lodge. He and his friend Appunni attempt various tricks to put them out of that lodge including through police force, but they recover from all. Swami, by Appunni's guidance, calls Payyoli Ananthan Gurukkal as a last attempt. However, Appavi Appukuttan, Ananthan Gurukal's twin brother takes up the job and goes as Ananthan. He makes friendship with all the men in the rented room. Also Appukuttan falls in love with Swami's youngest daughter Savithri. At last, Swami realizes they all are fooling him. He call his relative rowdy Ottapalam Venkkidi to help him and he enlists Cheenkanni Ramu, a better rowdy. The real Kalari Gurukkal Ananthan switches in for his brother and beats the rowdy to a pulp. The film ends with Appukuttan as the new manager of the restaurant after marrying Swami's daughter.

== Cast ==
- Jagadish as Kalari Gurukkal Ananthan/Appavi Appukuttan (double role)
- Siddique as Murali
- Maathu as Savithri
- Suchitra Murali as Gayathri
- Ashokan as Preman
- Maniyanpilla Raju as Adv. Jose Kurien
- Mala Aravindan as Appunni maashu
- Poojappura Ravi as Swami
- Sukumari as Mami
- Sainudeen as Venkkidi
- Kunchan as Hotel Helper
- Mannar Radhakrishnan as Police Inspector
- Kaduvakulam Antony as Sukumaran Gurukkal
- Thrissur Elsy as Ananthan & Appukuttan's mother
- Thesni Khan as Rajani
- Kundara Johnny as Cheengani Ramu

== Soundtrack ==
The songs were composed by Mohan Sithara and the lyrics were written by R. K. Damodaran.

Song	Singers
1 "Aninju Angaraagam"	K. J Yesudas
2 "Kaanaakkombil Pookkum"	S. Janaki
