= Poochakkaru Mani Kettum =

- Directed by: Thulasidas
- Written by: Rajan Kiriyath, Vinu Kiriyath
- Produced by: Liberty productions
- Starring: Mukesh; Siddique; Sunitha; Lakshmi
- Cinematography: Saloo George
- Edited by: G. Muraly
- Music by: Johnson
- Release date: 1992
- Country: India
- Language: Malayalam

Poochakkaru Mani Kettum (പൂച്ചക്കാര് മണിക്കെട്ടും) is a 1992 Indian Malayalam film, directed by Thulasidas, starring Mukesh, Siddique, Lakshmi and Sunitha in the lead roles.This film is remade in Telugu as 'Pelli Gola'.

== Plot ==
Kunjukutti Amma is the matriarch of the family, and wishes to marry off her grandson to one of his cousins. Seeking the wealth that could come through this relationship the parents of the three cousins compete for Kochukrishnan to be their son-in-law. However, Kochukrishnan has other plans. He and his friend Hareendran attempt to free themselves from this quandary. The sneaky tactics topples down. However, familial understanding and the core love they have as a family resolves everything.

== Cast ==
- Mukesh as Kochukrishnan
- Siddique as Hareendran
- Saumya as Gopika
- Lakshmi as Kunjukutti Amma
- Sunitha as Radhika Rani
- Kalpana as Karthika Devi
- Nedumudi Venu as Ambujakshan Nair (Ambotty)
- Devan as H/o Kunjukutti Amma
- Sainudeen as Kuruppu
- KPAC Lalitha as Parukutty
- Janardhanan as Menon
- Thodupuzha Vasanthi as Lakshmikutty
- Krishnankutty Nair as Dr. Kaimal
- Ragini as Sumathikutty
- Mala Aravindan as Venukuttan
- Kollam Thulasi Gopika's Father
- Sathyapriya as Gopika's Mother
- Mamukoya as Drama Artist
- Shivaji as Gopika's brother

== Soundtrack ==
- "Chandanathoniyumay" - K. S. Chithra
- "Maalathi Mandapangal" - Sujatha Mohan, M. G. Sreekumar
- "Sangeethame Samaje" - K. S. Chithra, M. G. Sreekumar
- "Thinkal Noyambin" - K. S. Chithra, M. G. Sreekumar
