= Ente Sneham Ninakku Mathram =

- Directed by: P. Sadhananthan
- Written by: Sithara Venu
- Screenplay by: Sithara Venu
- Starring: Sharada; Jagathy Sreekumar; Jose; Sukumaran
- Cinematography: Kannan Narayanan
- Music by: Shyam
- Production company: Abi Films
- Distributed by: Abi Films
- Release date: 27 April 1979
- Country: India
- Language: Malayalam

Ente Sneham Ninakku Mathram is a 1979 Indian Malayalam film, directed by P. Sadhananthan. The film stars Sharada, Jagathy Sreekumar, Jose and Sukumaran in the lead roles. The film has musical score by Shyam.

== Cast ==
- Sukumaran
- Jose
- Sharada
- Jagathy Sreekumar
- Sadhana
- Suchitra
- Sankaradi
- Janardhanan
- Murali Mohan

== Soundtrack ==
The music was composed by Shyam and the lyrics were written by Bichu Thirumala.

No.	Song	Singers	Lyrics	Length (m:ss)
1	"Premam Kaalikam"	K. J. Yesudas	Bichu Thirumala	
2	"Saayamkaalam"	S. Janaki	Bichu Thirumala	
3	"Thathachundan Vallangal"	Srikanth	Bichu Thirumala	
