= Ente Ponnu Thampuran =

Ente Ponnuthampuran
- Directed by: A. T. Abu
- Written by: Yesudasan
- Story by: Prakash Koleri
- Produced by: Mathews Peter Bathery; P. J. Joseph Bathery; Mahamood Koorara
- Starring: Suresh Gopi; Urvashi
- Cinematography: Ramachandra Babu; C. E. Babu
- Edited by: G. Murali
- Music by: G. Devarajan (songs); Mohan Sithara (score)
- Production company: Kabani Arts
- Distributed by: Chandragiri Films
- Release date: March 20, 1992
- Country: India
- Language: Malayalam

Ente Ponnuthampuran is a 1992 Indian Malayalam film, directed by A. T. Abu. Yesudasan wrote the screenplay for the story by Prakash Koleri. It stars Suresh Gopi and Urvashi in the lead roles.

== Plot ==
When Kavitha is forced by her father to marry an IAS officer, she seeks helps from her tutor. On the day of the wedding, Kavitha runs away from the mandap as she is not interested in marrying the groom, Prabhulla Kumar, an IAS officer that has been arranged for her. The bride's father suffers a heart attack upon learning that his daughter ran away from the mandap. Upon investigation, the groom is revealed to be a fraudster who has married different women in various districts of Kerala posing as multiple professions such as doctor and chartered account. Meanwhile, a woman is crying at the hospital because she doesn't have money to buy medicines and arrange for a heart surgery for her daughter. Here enters Vinod, who is this woman's son with cash for his sister's treatment and surgery. The sister and the bride's father are admitted to the same hospital. It turns out that Vinod's family and Kavitha's family used to be neighbours in their childhood days and they were childhood friends. Upon the death of Kavitha's mother, Kavitha and her father had to move away to their native place. Vinod meets Kavitha's father at the hospital and during their conversation, it comes out that Kavitha was abducted on the day of the wedding. Vinod reflects back to the day. It was on his bike that Kavitha fled, but unknowingly. Further, it is revealed that Seeekumar was the one who paid Vinod to abduct Kavitha. A fight ensues between Vinod and Seeekumar as Vinod tries to save Kavitha from Sreekumar. Sreekumar confesses that he had feelings for Kavitha which is why he wanted to stop the wedding and hence arranged for her kidnapping. In the fight, Vinod gets stabbed, but survives and they both unite.

== Cast ==
- Suresh Gopi as Thamburan/ Vinod
- Urvasi as Kavitha Bharathan Pilla
- Jagathy Sreekumar as Prabhulla Kumar
- Innocent as Varkki Pathrose Thunjanparambil
- Rajan P Dev as S.I. Idikulla
- Siddique as Pattar
- Mala Aravindan as Ravunni
- Mamukkoya as Mammotty Master
- Paravoor Bharathan as Bharathan Pilla
- Philomina as Meerabhayi
- Riza Bava as Sreekumar
- N. L. Balakrishnan as Fayalwan Vikneswaran Pilla
- A. C. Zainuddin as Korahachen
- Thesni Khan
- Lalithasree
- Zainuddin as Principal Kunjikora M A
- Trichur Elsi
- Kuthiravattam Pappu as Constable

== Soundtrack ==
Ente Ponnuthampuran

Soundtrack album by G. Devarajan
- Released: March 1991
- Studios: Tharangini, Trivandrum
- Genre: Film soundtrack
- Label: Tharangini

G. Devarajan chronology
| Yamanam (1991) | Ente Ponnuthampuran (1991) | Aakaashathinu Keezhe (1992) |

All songs were composed by G. Devarajan. This is Vayalar Sarath Chandra Varma's debut film as lyricist.

| No. | Title | Lyricist | Singer(s) | Raga |
|---|---|---|---|---|
| 1 | "Subhage" | Vayalar Ramavarma | K. J. Yesudas | Kambhoji |
| 2 | "Surabhilaswapnangal" | Vayalar Sarath Chandra Varma | K. J. Yesudas | |
| 3 | "Maagha Maasam" | Vayalar Sarath Chandra Varma | K. J. Yesudas, Lekha R. Nair | Kalyani |
| 4 | "Gaandharvathinu" | Vayalar Sarath Chandra Varma | K. J. Yesudas | |
