= Priyapetta Kukku =

- Directed by: Sunil
- Screenplay by: Kaloor Dennis
- Story by: Sunil
- Produced by: V Varghese
- Starring: Jagadish; Siddique; Geetha; Charmila
- Cinematography: Ravi K. Chandran
- Edited by: P C Mohanan
- Music by: S. P. Venkitesh
- Distributed by: Pratheeksha Pictures
- Release date: 1992
- Country: India
- Language: Malayalam

Priyapetta Kukku is a 1992 Malayalam film written and directed by Sunil. The film was produced by V Varghese under the banner of Surya Creators. It stars Jagadish, Siddique, Geetha and Baby Achu in the lead roles.

== Plot ==
Ajayan gets chased by some unknown people and he takes a bus to Chennai. In the bus he meets Saji. In Chennai he saves a baby girl abandoned on railway tracks. He tries to get abandon the baby unsuccessfully at various places. He comes to care for the baby. They meet Saji on the road and they get some help with a place to stay with Menon. He names the baby Kukku and claims he is a widower. He gets a job as a delivery man for a supermarket. Saji falls in love with Geetha but her father opposes their relationship because he is adopted. Menon's wife and daughter Sandhya become attached to Kukku. He reveals the truth to Menon and his family about how he found Kukku. He takes Kukku along with him on his delivery route. A woman sees the baby and claims that the baby is Ammu but Ajayan doesn't believe her. Geetha comes to meet Ajayan at home and tries to take the baby, claiming she's the mother. Geetha was under the impression that her husband and daughter had died in an accident. Actually Geetha's brother in laws had abandoned Ammu deliberately to acquire wealth after killing Geetha's husband. Thugs reach Ajayan's home in search of the kid and they fight. Saji's father advises him to return the baby to her mother. Ajayan discovers that Kukku's uncles are the ones behind everything and they have planned to eliminate the baby. Ajayan calls up Geetha and offers to give up the baby although he is heartbroken. After a fight with goons, Kukku gets injured but recovers after an operation. Baby Kukku/Ammu is reunited with her mother.

== Cast ==
- Jagadish as Ajayan
- Baby Achu as Kukku/Ammu
- Siddique as Saji
- Geetha as Maya, Voiced by Anandavally
- Charmila as Sandhya, Voiced by Sreeja Ravi
- Raghavan
- Meena
- Rani as Geetha Samual
- K. P. A. C. Sunny as Prameswara Menon
- Rajan P Dev as Punnoose
- Mahesh as Vijayan
- Rizabava as Viswanathan
- Zainuddin
- Prathapachandran as Adv. Samual
- Subair as Prakashan
- Anandavally
- Hari as Father
