= K. P. A. C. Sunny =

Indian Malayalam actor (1934–2006)

- Born: Sunny D'Cruz; 18 April 1934; Chavara, Quilon, Travancore
- Died: 18 April 2006 (aged 72)
- Occupation: Film actor
- Years active: 1961–2006
- Spouse: Mercy
- Children: Deepa, Roopa
- Parent: Jacob

K. P. A. C. Sunny (18 April 1934 – 18 April 2006) was an Indian actor in Malayalam movies. He acted in more than 400 Malayalam films. He occupied the movie industry for four decades.

== Background ==
Sunny was born as Sunny D'Cruz in Chavara, then Travancore on 18 April 1934. His father's name is Jacob. He completed his education at Chavara English Medium High School and graduated from Fatima Mata National College, Kollam. He established as a good actor while at school, where he also scripted a drama titled Sneham Anaswaramanu. He was elected as College Arts Club Secretary during college life. He also worked in Kala Nilayam. He worked as an Accountant in State Small Scale Agricultural Corporation from 1964. After joining K.P.A.C drama troupe he adopted K.P.A.C as a prefix for his name. In 2004, he received the Kerala Sangeetha Nataka Akademi Award for Drama.

Sunny died from a heart attack on 18 April 2006, which was his 72nd birthday. He was survived by his wife Mercy and two daughters.

== Filmography ==
=== 1970s ===
Year	Title	Role	Notes
1970	Madhuvidhu		
1971	Kochaniyathi	Reghu	
1972	Professor	Hostel Warden	
1973	Swargaputhri	Thampi	
1974	Nadeenadanmare Avasyamundu		
1974	Neelakannukal	Cheriyan Muthalali	
1975	Velicham Akale		
1975	Pennpada	Ramdas	
1975	Bhaarya Illaatha Raathri		
1975	Priyamulla Sophia		
1976	Panchami	Kannan	
1976	Hridayam Oru Kshethram	Dr. Sunny	
1977	Rathimanmadhan		
1977	Vidarunna Mottukal	Sulu's husband	
1977	Agninakshathram		
1977	Itha Ivide Vare	Thug	
1977	Muhoorthangal		
1978	Kaithappoo		
1978	Rowdy Ramu	Dasappan	
1978	Nakshathrangale Kaaval		
1978	Maattoly	Joseph	
1979	Tharangam	Varghese	
1979	Irumbazhikal	School Master	
1979	Enikku Njaan Swantham	Naanu	
1979	Indradhanussu		
1979	Kayalum Kayarum	Johnny	
1979	Chuvanna Chirakukal		
1979	Driver Madyapichirunnu		
1979	Sudhikalasam	Police Inspector	

=== 1980s ===
Year	Title	Role	Notes
1980	Angadi	Vishvanathan	
1980	Theenalangal	Damodharan master	
1980	Karimpana	Sunny	
1980	Eden Thottam	Varghese	
1980	Naayattu		
1980	Arangum Aniyarayum	Prathapan	
1981	Thaaraavu	Thevan	
1981	Kolilakkam		
1981	Ahimsa	Pappan	
1982	John Jaffer Janardhanan	Nanu	
1982	Thuranna Jail	Kuttan Pilla	
1983	Swapname Ninakku Nandi	Johny	
1984	Adaminte Vaariyellu	Eeppachan	
1984	April 18	DIG Santhosh Varma	
1984	Kodathy	Advocate	
1984	Minimol Vathicanil		
1984	Piriyilla Naam		
1984	Sandarbham		
1984	Umaanilayam	Raveendranath	
1985	Principal Olivil	Adv. Varma	
1985	Muhurtham Pathnonnu Muppathinu	Indu's father	
1985	Yathra	District Forest Officer	
1985	Eeran Sandhya	Police Officer	
1985	Boeing Boeing	Sreekandan Nair	
1985	Oru Kudakeezhil	Adv. Viswanathan Nair	
1986	Aayiram Kannukal	Fr. Alexander	
1986	Sukhamo Devi	Stephen	
1986	Moonnu Masangalku Mumbu	Judge	
1986	Rajavinte Makan	K. Venkitachalam, Public Prosecutor	
1986	Meenamasathile Sooryan	Jail Warden	
1986	Doore Doore Oru Koodu Koottam	School manager	
1986	Sunil Vayassu 20	Police Officer	
1986	Swamy Sreenarayana Guru		
1987	Irupatham Noottandu	Koshy	
1987	Aalippazhangal	Dr. Madhavan	
1987	Theertham	Dr. Ashokan	
1987	Vrutham	Barrister Vinod Menon	
1987	Bhoomiyile Rajakkanmar	Vishwambaran	
1988	Aparan	Kuriyachan	
1988	Oru CBI Diary Kurippu	C.I. Alex	
1988	August 1	Vishwam	
1988	Mukthi	Thomas Varghese	
1988	Inquilabinte Puthri	Raghavan	
1988	Ambalakkara Panchaayath		
1988	Vida Parayaan Maathram	Psychiatrist	
1988	Dhwani	Police Officer	
1988	Isabella	Alby	
1989	Adikkurippu	Karthikeyan	
1989	Agnipravesham		
1989	News	George Thomas	
1989	Naduvazhikal	Koshy	

=== 1990s ===
Year	Title	Role	Notes
1990	Arhatha	Commissioner Sreenivasan	
1990	Ee Thanutha Veluppan Kalathu	D.I.G Ayyappan Marar I.P.S	
1990	Naale Ennundengil		
1990	Veena Meettiya Vilangukal	Viswanathan	
1990	Indrajaalam	Adv. Narayana Swamy	
1990	No.20 Madras Mail	Sreedhara Menon	
1990	Lal Salam		
1990	Maanmizhiyaal		
1990	Kadathanadan Ambadi	Chandrappan's Brother	
1990	Vacation		
1991	Mahazar	Judge	
1991	Bhoomika		
1991	Nayam Vyakthamakkunnu	Sadasivan	
1991	Oru Prathyeka Ariyippu	S.P. Rajasekharan	
1991	Chakravarthy		
1991	Aanaval Mothiram	D.I.G. Michael Kurien	
1991	Onnaam Muhurtham	Shekhara Kurup	
1992	Thalastaanam	Minister Nandakumar Pillai	
1992	Kunukkitta Kozhi	Vakkachan	
1992	Priyapetta Kukku		
1992	Mahanagaram	Shankara Menon	
1992	Kizhakkan Pathrose	Priest	
1992	Ennodu Ishtam Koodamo	Arathi's Uncle	
1992	Kauravar	Kanaran	
1993	Kulapathi	Abdu	
1993	Sakshal Sreeman Chathunni	Rajagopal	
1993	Journalist	Police Officer	
1993	Thalamura		
1994	Varaphalam	Sahadevan	
1994	Moonnaam Loka Pattaalam		
1994	Commissioner	Kunju Moideen Sahib	
1994	Vendor Daniel State Licency	Dy.SP Krishnankutty Nair	
1995	The King	Sulaiman	Cameo
1995	Achan Kombathu Amma Varampathu	Advocate	
1995	Peter Scott	Police Officer	
1997	Shobhanam	Thampan	
1999	Ezhupunna Tharakan	Ezhupunna Mathew Tharakan	

=== 2000s ===
Year	Title	Role	Notes
2000	Rapid Action Force	CI Jacob	
2005	Five Fingers		
