= Ellarum Chollanu =

- Directed by: Kaladharan
- Written by: Rafi Mecartin
- Produced by: G. P. Vijayakumar
- Starring: Mukesh; Jagathy Sreekumar
- Music by: S. P. Venkatesh
- Release date: 1992
- Country: India
- Language: Malayalam

Ellarum Chollanu (transl. Everyone saying) is a 1992 Indian Malayalam-language comedy-drama film directed by Kaladharan and written by Rafi Mecartin, starring Mukesh and Jagathy Sreekumar in the lead roles.

== Plot ==
The story is about Ramachandran, who comes back from Dubai to the village posing as a rich business man with a fortune. Actually, he was a victim of visa fraud and was acting as assistant to lottery ticket seller Adimakkannu. Rumours of his fortune were actually spread by his friends. But Ramachandran plays along and tries to take over the major factory in the village, Archana Mills.

== Cast ==
- Mukesh as Ramachandran
- Suman Ranganathan as Archana Nair
- Maniyanpilla Raju as Mani
- Mamukkoya as Adimakkannu
- Sai Kumar as Dasutty
- Jagathy Sreekumar as Pillai
- Paravoor Bharathan as Mathunni
- Oduvil Unnikrishnan as Ravunni Menon
- Vijayaraghavan as Gopalakrishnan/ G. K.
- A. C. Zainuddin as Shaik Ahammed Khaltha
- Sukumari as Ramachandran's mother
- Beena Antony
- Kollam Thulasi
- Kalabhavan Abi
- Kalabhavan Rahman
- Kalabhavan Haneef
- Usharani

== Soundtrack ==
Songs were composed by S. P. Venkatesh, with lyrics penned by Sreekumaran Thampi.

Song	Singers
1 "Nammude Naadinu Mochanam"	Balagopalan Thampi
2 "Paadu Ini Paadu"	K. J. Yesudas
3 "Sukham Sukham"	K. J. Yesudas
