= Ennodu Ishtam Koodamo =

Ennodishtam Koodamo
- Poster
- Directed by: Kamal
- Written by: Raghunath Paleri
- Produced by: Mudra Sasi
- Starring: Mukesh; Madhoo; Siddique; J. D. Chakravarthy; Mavelikkara Ponnamma
- Cinematography: Saloo George
- Edited by: K. Rajagopal
- Music by: S. P. Venkatesh
- Distributed by: Mudra Arts
- Release date: 14 February 1992
- Country: India
- Language: Malayalam

Ennodishtam Koodamo (transl. Can you love me more?) is a 1992 Indian Malayalam-language romantic comedy film directed by Kamal, written by Raghunath Paleri, and produced by Mudra Sasi. It stars Mukesh, Madhoo, Siddique, J. D. Chakravarthy, and Janardhanan.

The film marks the acting debut of Dileep who played a small role and the Malayalam film debut of J. D. Chakravarthy. Dileep and Lal Jose served as assistant directors to Kamal.

== Plot ==
This movie is a Rom com. The movie revolves around jobless youth Ramanunni. He plays kabaddi and installs small road advertisements to earn money. His father, Veeran Nair, had been working for years as a driver under Arathi Nair for Bobby's family. Due to his father's injury, Ramanunni starts going to their home as their driver. Bobby understands Ramanunni has a crush on her, and she and her grandmother decide to fool him by saying she is in love with him, like she did fool an old classmate during her collage time. During a drive Renjith Lal attacks Bobby and Ramanunni defends her and fight them off after she says Ramanunni is her fiance. Bobby falls for him and believes she loves him. Soon Bobby's real fiance Janachandran, who is current city commissioner, visits her and arranges her marriage. Shocked, Ramanunni asks her to elope with him and, but she says she was only fooling him. Heartbroken, Ramanunni leaves the job and in desperation he talks to Janachandran and falsely tells him that he and Bobby had a physical relationship. Shocked and heartbroken, Janachandran breaks off the marriage, which shocks Bobby and her family. As a result, they beat Ramanunni up, but he tells he did it due to her lying and broking his heart. Hearing that, they leave him, and her dad plans to take her abroad.

Bobby asks Grandma whether she loved that poet. Says she does not actually know, maybe she did. Bobby realises her mistake and confesses her love to Ramanunni. Ramanunni is not immediately convinced. In the end, due to love, he goes to her at the airport, and they unite.

== Cast ==
- Mukesh as Ramanunni
- Madhoo as Arathi Menon / Bobby
- Siddique as City Police Commissioner Jinachandran IPS
- Mavelikkara Ponnamma as Arathi's Grandmother
- J. D. Chakravarthy as Renjith Lal
- Janardhanan as Circle Inspector / Arathi's Uncle
- K.P.A.C. Sunny as Arathi's Uncle
- Sathaar as ASP / Arathi's uncle
- Krishnankutty Nair as Veeran Nair
- KPAC Lalitha as Ramanunni's sister
- Zainuddin as Sundaran
- Kalpana as Bhagyalakshmi
- Idavela Babu as Ramanunni's Friend
- Innocent as Dr. Kuttan
- M. G. Soman as Arathi's father
- Unnimary
- Vettukili Prakash as Vettukili
- Alummoodan as Kunjikkuttan / Principal
- Dileep as Dileep, Renjith Lal's friend
- Kunchan as Krishnankutty
- Kanakalatha
- Jagathy Sreekumar in a photo

== Soundtrack ==
The film had a musical score composed by S. P. Venkatesh and the lyrics were written by Kaithapram.

1. Puthuvarna Vasantham : K. J. Yesudas, Sujatha
2. Hey Nilakkili : S. Janaki
3. kuvalaya mizhiyil : K J Yesudas
