= Welcome to Kodaikanal =

1992 Indian film

- Poster
- Directed by: Anil Babu
- Screenplay by: Kaloor Dennis
- Story by: Asha Mathew
- Produced by: Hameed
- Starring: Jagadish; Siddique; Anusha; Geetha; Shwetha Menon; Sai Kumar
- Cinematography: Ravi K. Chandran
- Edited by: P. C. Mohanan
- Music by: C. Rajamani
- Production company: Jamee Movies
- Distributed by: Pratheeksha Pictures
- Release date: 28 May 1992
- Country: India
- Language: Malayalam

Welcome to Kodaikanal is a 1992 Indian Malayalam-language drama film directed by Anil Babu and written by Kaloor Dennis from a story by Asha Mathew. The film stars Jagadish, along with Siddique, Anusha, Shweta Menon, Sai Kumar and Geetha in supporting roles. The music was composed by C. Rajamani.

== Plot ==
James Kutty's dead body in found in a river. Flashbacks reveal his life as a music teacher in Kodaikanal and the hardships he faced there.

== Cast ==
- Jagadish as James Kutty
- Siddique as Vinayachandran
- Anusha as Maya
- Sukumari as Elizabeth Samuel
- Geetha as Dr.Vilasini
- Sai Kumar as Biju
- Zainuddin as Hussain
- Shweta Menon as Kavitha
- Mala Aravindan as Eradi
- Bobby Kottarakkara as Kunjachan
- K. P. A. C. Sunny as Police officer
- Kanakalatha

== Production ==
The film was originally planned with Mohanlal in the lead role, who opted out from the film. He was replaced by Jagadish.

== Soundtrack ==
Rajamani gave music to the lines written by Bichu Thirumala.

Song list

1. "Pathayoram": M. G. Sreekumar, Minmini
2. "Manjukuttikal": M. G. Sreekumar
3. "Swayam Marannuvo": M. G. Sreekumar, R. Usha
4. "Manjukuttikal": K. S. Chithra
5. "Swayam Marannuvo": (Pathos): M. G. Sreekumar
