= Krishnankutty Nair =

Indian actor

- Born: Pippinmoodu, Thiruvananthapuram
- Died: 6 November 1996; Trivandrum, Kerala, India
- Occupation: Actor
- Years active: 1979–1996

Krishnankutty Nair was an Indian actor who worked in Malayalam cinema. He was from Pippinmoodu, near Sasthamangalam, Thiruvananthapuram, Kerala. Nair worked with various theatre groups before becoming a film actor.

Known for his natural acting and timing, Nair worked with directors such as G. Aravindan, and Adoor Gopalakrishnan. He also acted in several movies by award-winning Malayalam filmmakers such as M. P. Sukumaran Nair, Lenin Rajendran, Padmarajan, Kamal, and Sathyan Anthikkad. He became popular among the public through his comic roles, primarily that of Kaalan Mathai in Kamal's Kakkothikkavile Appooppan Thaadikal, Thattan Gopalan in Anthikkad's Ponmuttayidunna Tharavu, and Kali Muthu in Anthikad's Mazhavilkavadi.

== Death ==
In 1996, Krishnankutty Nair was seriously injured as a scooter he was riding pillion collided with a lorry. He succumbed to injuries after a month at the Government Medical College, Thiruvananthapuram.

== Filmography ==
Year	Title	Role	Notes
1979	Peruvazhiyambalam	Vaidhyan	
1981	Oridathoru Phayalvaan	Veloonju	
1983	Prem Nazirine Kanmanilla	Mamachan	
1983	Asthi	Kumaran Nair	
1986	Meenamasathile Sooryan	Police officer	
1986	Kariyilakkattu Pole	Appu Pillai	
1986	Arappatta Kettiya Gramathil	Kesava Menon	
1986	Oridathu	Shekharan	
1987	Anantaram		
1988	Ore Thooval Pakshikal		
1988	Marattam		
1988	Kakkothikkavile Appooppan Thaadikal	Kaalan Mathai	
1988	Ponmuttayidunna Tharavu	Gopalan	
1989	Annakutty Kodambakkam Vilikkunnu		
1989	Mazhavilkavadi	Kaleeswaran Kavalayil Kali Muthu	
1989	Devadas	Bhoothalingam	
1989	Varavelpu	Ramas Father	
1989	Varnam	K. Purushothaman	
1990	Dr. Pasupathy	Nanu Nair	
1990	Unnikuttanu Joli Kitti		
1990	Mathilukal		
1990	Kottayam Kunjachan	Pachakkulam Vasu	
1990	Superstar	Sub Inspector	
1990	Randam Varavu	Nanappan	
1991	Aakasha Kottayile Sultan	Pushkaran	
1991	Chanchattam	Superintendent	
1991	Cheppukilukkana Changathi	Stamp Vizhungi Raman Pillai	
1991	Kadinjool Kalyanam	Veerabhadran	
1991	Kankettu	Pothuval	
1991	Kuttapathram	Mithran	
1991	Nettippattom	Indus Father	
1991	Ulladakkam	Mental Patient	
1991	Aparaahnam		
1991	Mookilla Rajyathu	Bheem Singh	
1992	Kizhakkan Pathrose		
1992	Ennodishtam Koodamo	Veeran Nair	
1992	Ezhara Ponnana	Panikkar	
1992	Maanthrika Cheppu	V. K. Nair	
1993	Sowbhagyam	Nanu Ashan	
1993	O' Faby	Slum man	
1993	Vakkeel Vasudev	Current Thankappan	
1993	Padaleeputhram		
1993	Kavadiyattam	Valiya Kuruppu	
1993	Sthalathe Pradhana Payyans	Marukandam Madhavan	
1994	Dollar	Uthuppu	
1994	Poochakkaru Mani Kettum	Kaimal	
1995	Boxer	Shaktidharan Pillai	
1995	Vrudhanmare Sookshikkuka	Bheemasena Kurup	
1995	Avittam Thirunaal Aarogya Sriman	K. K. Kizhakkedam	

== Television ==
- Kairali Vilasam Lodge (Doordarshan)
- Manchiyam (Asianet) last telefilm he did in the year 1996
