= Kunukkitta Kozhi =

- Directed by: Viji Thampi
- Written by: Kaloor Dennis
- Produced by: Mumthas Basheer
- Starring: Jagadheesh; Siddique; Rupini; Parvathy
- Cinematography: Raju Eswaran
- Edited by: G. Murali
- Music by: Johnson
- Production company: Simple Productions
- Distributed by: Keerthi Release; Jubilee Pictures
- Release date: 30 January 1992
- Country: India
- Language: Malayalam

Kunukkkitta Kozhi (transl. Kunukku-clad Hen) is a 1992 Indian Malayalam-language comedy-drama film directed by Viji Thampi and written by Kaloor Dennis, starring Jagadeesh, Siddique, Rupini and Parvathy. The songs were composed by Johnson.

== Plot ==
Unnikrishnan is a street-smart jobless youth desperate to get a job. Once in a job interview, Swarnalatha outsmarts him to get the job by telling the manager that she is Unnikrishnan's wife and because of his irresponsible behaviour, they are in dire straits. The manager, who was earlier irritated by Unnikrishnan's interview, out of sympathy offers her the job. Unnikrishnan, meanwhile, learns of this and he demands half of her salary.

Meanwhile, Swarnalatha's close friend Indumathy and her husband Viswanathan are going through a rough patch financially and he is unable to repay the loans which he had taken. Circumstances lead Unnikrishnan to be mistaken for Viswanathan by the grandmother of Indumathy and invites him and her once banished granddaughter, who had eloped with Viswanathan, back to their ancestral home. To avoid traumatising her grandmother, Indumathy and Unnikrishnan act as husband and wife and Swarnalatha also stays with them. The arrival of Viswanathan too on the scene causes chaos and confusion, starting with him assaulting Unnikrishnan.

== Cast ==
- Jagadish as Unnikrishnan / Unni
- Siddique as Viswanathan / Viswan, Unni's friend
- Rupini as Swarnalatha / Latha, Unnikrishnan's lover
- Parvathy as Indumathy / Indu, Viswanathan's wife
- Jagathy Sreekumar as Sooryanarayana Gurukkal / Gurukkal Ammavan, Indumathy's uncle
- Philomina as Indumathy's grandmother
- K. P. A. C. Sunny as Avarachan
- Sadiq as Suneesh, Avarachan's henchman
- Jagannatha Varma as Indus Motors Company Chairman Gangadhara Menon
- Subair as Advocate Thomas Mathew, Viswanathan's friend
- Jagannathan as Latha's company staff
- James as car driver from Bangalore
- Vinod Kozhikode as Avarachan's henchman

== Soundtrack ==
- "Kunungi Kunungi" - K V Sivaprasad and Latika
- "Illakattile" - K J Yesudas
