= Thiruthalvaadi =

- Directed by: Viji Thampi
- Screenplay by: Kaloor Dennis
- Story by: Visu
- Based on: Manal Kayiru (1982)
- Produced by: Mudra Arts
- Starring: Siddique; Jagadish; Jagathy Sreekumar; Urvashi; Sivaranjini; Zeenath
- Cinematography: Sanjeev Sankar
- Edited by: K. P. Hariharaputhran
- Music by: S. P. Venkatesh
- Distributed by: Mudra Arts
- Release date: 1992
- Country: India
- Language: Malayalam

Thiruthalvaadi (transl. The Revisionist) is a 1992 Malayalam film written by Kaloor Dennis and directed by Viji Thampi. The film stars Siddique, Jagadish, Jagathy Sreekumar, Urvashi and Sivaranjini in the main roles. The basic plot was based on the 1982 Tamil movie Manal Kayiru, directed by Visu.

== Plot ==
Vishnu is the regional manager in a travel company and he is a bachelor. His friends and relatives try to get him married, but Vishnu has seven conditions for his future wife, including ones such as knowing Carnatic music, Hindi, Chinese and western cooking. So his friend Krishnankutty does many cunning things to make Vishnu marry Lathika. After that, they both marry. But the real problems begin there.

== Cast ==
- Siddique as Vishnu Menon, regional manager in private company
- Jagadish as Krishnankutty, Vishnu's best friend and company staff
- Jagathy Sreekumar as V. G. Kurup, Vishnu's brother-in-law
- Urvashi as Lathika, Vishnu's wife
- Sivaranjani as Indhu, Krishnakutty's lover and KSRTC bus conductor
- Zeenath as Parvathy Kurup, Vishnu's sister
- A. C. Zainuddin as Dayanandan, Vishnu's office staff
- Rizabawa as Wilfred, staff accountant
- Sankaradi as Raghavan Master, Lathika's father
- Oduvil Unnikrishnan as KSRTC checking inspector
- Sukumari as doctor
- Manu Varma as office staff
- Beena Antony as office staff
- Kunchan as Vaasu
- Thesni Khan as Sudha
- T. P. Madhavan as Sudha's father
- Jagannathan as Chekkattu Velukutty Bhagavathar
- Viji Thampi as Avatar Singh
- V. M. Vinu as serial director

== Music ==
Lyrics: Gireesh Puthenchery

- "Neelayaamini" (male) - K. J. Yesudas
- "Thankakkasavaniyum" - K.J. Yesudas, K.S. Chithra
- "Manchaadi Choppu Minungum"" - Sidhique, K.S. Chithra
- "Neelayaamini" (female) - K.S. Chithra
