= Zainuddin (actor) =

Indian actor and comedian

- Born: A. C. Sainuddin; 12 May 1952; Cochin, State of Travancore–Cochin (present day Ernakulam, Kerala), India
- Died: 4 November 1999 (aged 47); Kochi, Ernakulam, Kerala, India
- Occupations: Actor; Mimicry artist
- Years active: 1986–1999
- Spouse: Laila
- Children: 2

A. C. Sainuddin (12 May 1952 – 4 November 1999), mononymously known as Zainuddin, was an Indian actor, assistant director and comedian, who worked in Malayalam cinema.

== Career ==
Zainuddin started his career as a mimicry artist in Cochin Kalabhavan. He was expert in imitating actor Madhu, especially his mannerisms as Pareekkutty in Chemmeen. He first appeared in films like Chappa directed by P. A. Bakkar. He then went on to act in over 150 films in a span of 13 years from 1986 to 1999.

He was noted for his role as a siamese twin in the film Siamese Irattakal, which featured him as a conjoined twin to Maniyanpilla Raju. Zainuddin also excelled in his roles in Mimics Parade, Hitler, Kabooliwala, Lal Salaam, Kasargode Khaderbhai and Alanchery Thambrakkal. By the late 1990s, he started to suffer from respiratory diseases. Zainuddin was a member of a stage programme organised by Association of Malayalam Movie Artists (AMMA) to raise funds for the families of deceased in the Kargil war of 1999, which happened to be his last stage programme.

He died of respiratory complications at a private hospital in Kochi on 4 November 1999. He was only 47 at the time of his death. His last credited role was in the film Ezhupunna Tharakan.

== Personal life ==
Zainuddin was married to Laila in 1982 who was working as a Hindi teacher in Government Vocational Higher Secondary School, and they have two sons Zinsil and Zinil.

Zinsil completed his M.B.A. He married Anfiya and he has tried his luck in a Malayalam movie, Puthumukhangal (2010).

Zinil completed his graduation in computer engineering. Zinil Zainudeen marked his acting debut in the 2014 Malayalam movie To Let Ambadi Talkies along with Arjun Ashokan.

== Filmography ==
=== 1980s ===
| Year | Title | Role | Notes |
|---|---|---|---|
| 1982 | Chappa | Vasu | |
| 1984 | My Dear Kuttichathan | Barman | |
| 1986 | Pappan Priyappetta Pappan | | |
| 1986 | Onnu Muthal Poojyam Vare | Santa Claus | |
| 1988 | Uyaran Orumikakan | | |
| 1989 | Chanakyan | Mimicry artist | |

=== 1990s ===
| Year | Title | Role | Notes |
|---|---|---|---|
| 1990 | Indrajaalam | Kuttan | |
| 1990 | Shubhayathra | Mohan | |
| 1990 | Gajakesariyogam | Veeraraghavan Nair | |
| 1990 | Dr. Pasupathy | Kunjan Nair | |
| 1990 | Lal Salaam | Ayyappan Thampi | |
| 1990 | Nanma Niranjavan Sreenivasan | | |
| 1990 | Thoovalsparsham | | |
| 1990 | Appu | Ramanan | |
| 1990 | Kottayam Kunjachan | Kumarakom Kochu Pappi | |
| 1991 | Postbox No.27 | | |
| 1991 | Irikku M.D. Akathundu | Abdul Nazer | |
| 1991 | Swanthwanam | Venu | |
| 1991 | Ulladakkam | Chakrapani | |
| 1991 | Nagarathil Samsara Vishayam | Sundareshan | |
| 1991 | Mimics Parade | Nissar | |
| 1991 | Nayam Vyakthamakkunnu | Gunman Sekhar | |
| 1991 | Innathe Program | Salim | |
| 1991 | Chanchattam | Bus Conductor | |
| 1991 | Aakasha Kottayile Sultan | Chenthrappinni's Asst. | |
| 1991 | Amaram | Damodaran | |
| 1992 | Pandu Pandoru Rajakumari | Velu | |
| 1992 | Priyapetta Kukku | | |
| 1992 | Thiruthalvaadi | Dayanandan | |
| 1992 | Ootty Pattanam | Marthanda Varma | |
| 1992 | Nakshthrakoodaram | Kuttappan | |
| 1992 | Manthrikacheppu | Ustad Seythali | |
| 1992 | Kasargode Khadarbhai | Nissar | |
| 1992 | Chevalier Michael | | |
| 1992 | Kallan Kappalil Thanne | Venkidi | |
| 1992 | Congratulations Miss Anitha Menon | | |
| 1992 | First Bell | Kunjuraman | |
| 1992 | Mr & Mrs | | |
| 1992 | Ezhara Ponnana | Chellappan | |
| 1992 | Ente Ponnu Thampuran | Kunji Korah | |
| 1992 | Ennodishtam Koodamo | Bhagyam's Husband | |
| 1992 | Ellarum Chollanu | Arabi | |
| 1992 | Ardram | Sathyaseelan | |
| 1992 | Kizhakkan Pathrose | Khader | |
| 1992 | Welcome to Kodaikanal | Hussain | |
| 1992 | Grihapravesham | | |
| 1992 | Ponnaaranthottathe Raajaavu | | |
| 1993 | Sowbhagyam | Balachandran's colleague | |
| 1993 | Kulapathi | | |
| 1993 | Ithu Manjukaalam | | |
| 1993 | Sakshal Sreeman Chathunni | Gopalan | |
| 1993 | Koushalam | Mathunni | |
| 1993 | Gandhari | | |
| 1993 | Uppukandam Brothers | Keshu Nair | |
| 1993 | Varam | Peter Fernadez | |
| 1993 | Ponnu Chami | Aravindakshan | |
| 1993 | Jackpot | | |
| 1993 | Kavadiyattam | Nariyaparampil Mathukutty | |
| 1993 | Customs Diary | Vikraman | |
| 1993 | Bhaagyavaan | Mammu | |
| 1994 | Kadal | Kora | |
| 1994 | Dollar | Kuttappayi | |
| 1994 | Sudhinam | Shekharan | |
| 1994 | Sukham Sukhakaram | | |
| 1994 | Varabhalam | | |
| 1994 | Poochakkaru Mani Kettum | Kurup | |
| 1994 | Bheeshmacharya | Kannan Nair | |
| 1994 | Gothram | | |
| 1994 | Napoleon | Charapara Prabhakaran | |
| 1995 | Thirumanassu | Vasu | |
| 1995 | Pai Brothers | Psychiatrist | |
| 1995 | Rajakeeyam | Seethavathi | |
| 1995 | Mimics Action 500 | Johnykutty | |
| 1995 | Hijack | Keshu | |
| 1995 | Mangalyasootram | Sujanan | |
| 1995 | Boxer | Polachi Rajan | |
| 1995 | Thumboli Kadappuram | | |
| 1995 | Mazhavilkoodaram | Professor | |
| 1995 | Special Squad | Murugan | |
| 1995 | Punnaram | K.K. Mathai | |
| 1995 | Manikya Chempazhukka | Krishnan | |
| 1995 | Alancheri Thamprakkal | Purushothaman | |
| 1995 | Mangalam Veettil Manaseswari Gupta | Albert | |
| 1995 | Kidilol Kidilam | Warrier | |
| 1995 | Keerthanam | | |
| 1995 | Kalamasseriyil Kalyanayogam | 'Gundu' Vasu | |
| 1995 | Puthukkottayile Puthumanavalan | Puthukkotta Inspector | |
| 1995 | Achan Rajavu Appan Jethavu | | |
| 1996 | Tom & Jerry | Peter | |
| 1996 | Padanayakan | Karimpoocha Kannappan | |
| 1996 | Harbour | Aloshi | |
| 1996 | Kudumbakodathi | Swami Laxmanandha | |
| 1996 | Hitler | Sathyapalan | |
| 1996 | Sathyabhamakkoru Premalekhanam | Aniyan Thamburan | |
| 1996 | Mimics Super 1000 | | |
| 1996 | Pallivaathukkal Thommichan | | |
| 1996 | Azhakiya Ravanan | Himself | |
| 1996 | Aayiram Naavulla Ananthan | Kammath | |
| 1996 | Nandagopalante Kusruthikal | | |
| 1996 | Malayala Masom Chingam Onnu | Shersaab | |
| 1996 | Kalyana Sowgandhikam | Hariprasad | |
| 1996 | Excuse Me Ethu Collegila | | |
| 1996 | KL 7-95 Ernakulam North | | |
| 1997 | Ancharakkalyanam | | |
| 1997 | Killikurissiyile Kudumbamela | | |
| 1997 | Moonnu Kodiyum 300 Pavanum | | |
| 1997 | Kottappurathe Koottukudumbam | S. I. | |
| 1997 | Newspaper Boy | Phalgunan | |
| 1997 | Siamese Irattakal | | |
| 1997 | Hitler Brothers | Kesavankutty | |
| 1997 | Ikkareyanente Manasam | Sumathi's Uncle | |
| 1998 | Manthri Maalikayil Manasammatham | Jhony | |
| 1998 | Rakthasakshikal Sindabad | | |
| 1998 | Gloria Fernandes From U.S.A. | | |
| 1999 | Panchapandavar | Luko | |
| 1999 | Charlie Chaplin | Photographer | |
| 1999 | Auto Brothers | | |
| 1999 | Parassala Pachan Payyannur Paramu | | |
| 1999 | Niram | | |
| 1999 | My Dear Karadi | Zoo Supervisor | |
| 1999 | Ezhupunna Tharakan | Pushkaran | |
| 1999 | Onnaamvattam Kandappol | SI Shukkoor | |
| 1999 | Independence | Head Constable | |
