= Jagadish =

Indian actor

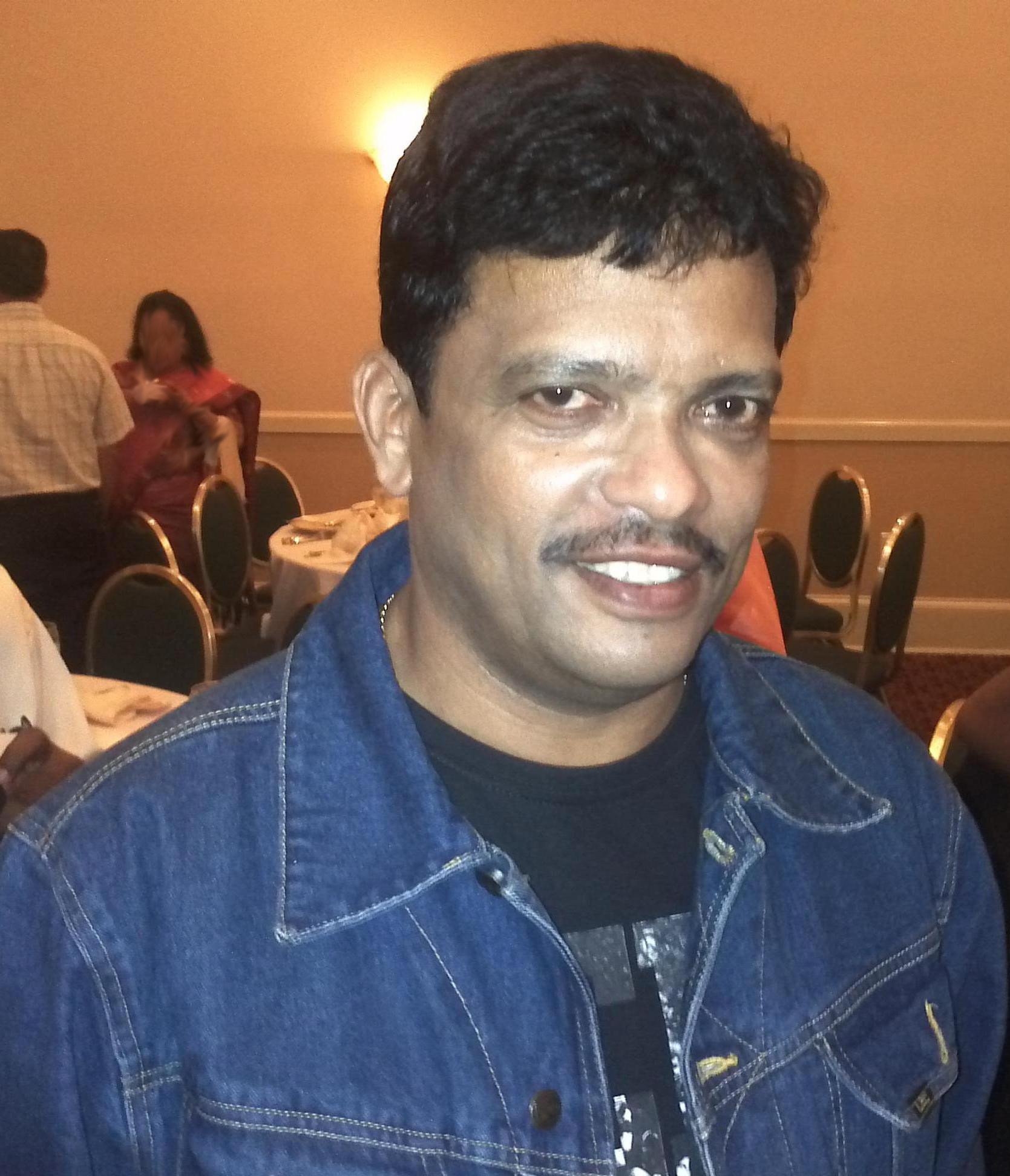
- Jagadish in 2012
- Born: P. V. Jagadish Kumar; Trivandrum, Travancore-Cochin (present day Kerala), India
- Education: Mar Ivanios College, Trivandrum (M.Com)
- Occupations: Actor; screenwriter; TV host; professor; bank manager
- Years active: 1984–present
- Spouse: Prof. Rema Jagadish (died 2022)
- Children: 2

P. V. Jagadish Kumar, better known mononymously as Jagadish, is an Indian actor, screenwriter, television presenter, former college lecturer and former banker. He has starred in over 400 Malayalam films and two Hindi films. He is best known for his comic and character roles. Jagadish starred in over 50 films as the lead actor during the 1990s. He was one of the bankable lead stars in Malayalam cinema during the 1990s.

Jagadish is a postgraduate M.Com. rank-holder. He transitioned from a bank officer to a government-aided college lecturer and to an actor. Jagadish made his acting debut with My Dear Kuttichathan (1984), India's first 3D film. He got a break with his role as Appukuttan in Siddique-Lal's In Harihar Nagar (1990). His notable films include Godfather (1991), Mimics Parade (1991), Welcome to Kodaikanal (1992), Thiruthalvaadi (1992), Priyapetta Kukku (1992), Mr & Mrs (1992), Pandu Pandoru Rajakumari (1992), Kunukkitta Kozhi (1992), Kasarkode Khaderbai (1992), Kallan Kappalil Thanne (1992), Grihaprevesam (1992), Sthreedhanam (1993), Sthalathe Pradhana Payyans (1993), Injakkadan Mathai & Sons (1993), Simhavalan Menon (1995), Mimics Super 1000 (1996), Hitler (1996), Junior Mandrake (1997) and Gramapanchayath (1998). He has written a few scripts as well, most notably Adhipan (1989).

In 2016, Jagadish entered into politics to compete against his colleague and former state minister K. B. Ganesh Kumar for Member of the Legislative Assembly post of the Pathanapuram constituency under the banner of the Indian National Congress and lost in the elections.

== Early life ==
Jagadish was born as the fifth son among six children to K. Parameshwaran Nair and P. Bhasurangi Amma in present-day Chenkal, Neyyattinkara, Thiruvananthapuram. His father was a school headmaster, and his mother was a housewife. He has two elder brothers, Dr. Gopakumar and Rajkumar; a younger brother, Sureshkumar; and two elder sisters, Late Dr. P.B. Santha Devi and Chandrika Devi.

Jagadish had his primary education at Government Model Boys Higher Secondary School, Thiruvananthapuram. He earned a bachelor's in commerce from Government Arts College, Thiruvananthapuram. He then post-graduated with a Master of Commerce from Mar Ivanios College, Trivandrum, under the University of Kerala with first rank.

Jagadish worked as a clerk in Canara Bank, Edappal, Malappuram. Later he became a lecturer and NCC officer at M.G. College, Thiruvananthapuram, a college run by NSS. He had also worked as a lecturer at Pazhassi Raja N. S. S. College, Mattanur, Kannur. He had dreams of becoming a film actor, so he took a long leave from his job and tried his luck in films.

== Film career ==
Jagadish dubbed for various other actors, normally for short dialogues. As an actor, he debuted with a minor role as a cabaret announcer in My Dear Kuttichathan (1984), which was India's first 3-D film. Jagadish became an established actor with his roles in Mutharamkunnu P.O. (1985), where he plays the hero's friend, Nandi Veendum Varika (1986), Manivathoorile Aayiram Sivarathrikal (1987) and Vandanam (1989). In his early career, he wrote stories and screenplays for a few films including Mazha Peyyunnu Maddalam Kottunnu (1986) (story), Manivathoorile Aayiram Sivarathrikal (1987) (dialogue) and Adhipan (1989) (screenplay). Jagadish's performance as Appukkuttan in In Harihar Nagar (1990), directed by Siddique-Lal, was highly acclaimed. Jagadish proved himself again with terrific comic timing with his role as Mayin kutty in Godfather (1991), which was directed by the same director duo. He continued to play minor roles in high-budget films until 1993–1994. With the success of these movies, Jagadish became one of the popular actors in the early to mid-1990s. He acted in the leading role in more than 30 low-budget films, most of which were successes at the box office. He acted in the family-oriented movies Sthree dhanam, Bharya, Ponnaranthottathe Rajavu, and Mr and Mrs. He also acted in the slapstick comedies Pavam IA Ivachan, and Kunukkitta Kozhi. In most movies he shared the hero role with the likes of Mukesh and Siddique. In his prime, he also acted in supporting roles with prominent leading actors. The roles in Butterflies, Minnaminunginum Minnukettu and Jackpot earned applause from the audience.

He later appeared in stage shows conducted in foreign countries with his self-mocking stances and improvised dialogues.

Jagadish reappeared as Appukkuttan in Harihar Nagar 2, a sequel to In Harihar Nagar. The film went on to become a hit. He starred in the lead role in Decent Parties.

In 2010, he scripted for the film April Fool, which was a commercial failure. After a hiatus, he came back through television programs as a chief judge for the comedy programme Vodafone Comedy Stars in Asianet and anchored the channel's award functions. He continued to host more TV shows along with films. He revealed in an interview as his fellow generation of actors were turning to production, he also is planning to direct a movie with Mammootty in the lead role.

In 2016, in Ranjith's movie Leela Jagadish played the negative role of a drunkard father which gathered wide appreciation.

== Personal life ==
Jagadish was married to P. Rema, a forensic professor in the Medical College, Thiruvananthapuram, who died on 1 April 2022. The couple has two daughters, both doctors, now married and have children. They are settled at Kaladi, Karamana, Thiruvananthapuram.

== Awards ==
Kerala Film Critics Association Awards

- 1990: Special Jury Award - Malayogom
- 1991: Second Best Actor - Mukha Chithram, Nettippattom
- 2012: Special Jury Award - Ozhimuri, White Paper
- 2024: Ruby Jubilee Award - Outstanding contributions to Malayalam cinema

Other awards and honors

- 2009: Asianet Film Award for Best Actor in a Comic Role – 2 Harihar Nagar
- 2016: Asianet Television Awards – Golden Star Award - Comedy Stars (Season 2)
- 2024: Filmfare Award for Best Supporting Actor – Malayalam - Purusha Pretham
- 2024: Mazhavil Entertainment Awards - The Entertainer of the Year - Character Role - Falimy, Garudan, Neru, Abraham Ozler
- 2025: Prem Nazir Chalachitra Shreshta Puraskaram, lifetime achievement award by Prem Nazeer Suhruth Samithi
- 2025: Honoured at the platinum jubilee celebration of Mar Ivanios College, as the alumni for enriching the Malayalam cinema and television industries for five decades.
