= Siddique (actor) =

Indian actor (born 1962)

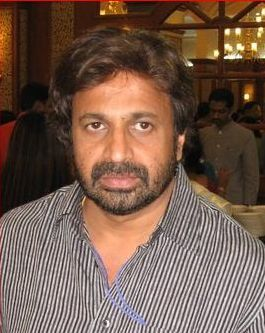
- Siddiquee in 2019
- Born: Siddique Mamathu; 1 October 1962 (age 63); Kochi, Kerala, India
- Occupations: Actor; film producer; film director; entrepreneur
- Years active: 1985–present
- Spouse: Seena
- Children: 3

Siddique Mamathu (born 1 October 1962), known mononymously as Siddique, is an Indian actor and producer, who works mainly in Malayalam cinema. Along with appearing in over 350 Malayalam films, he has also acted in Tamil, Telugu and Hindi language films. He is known for having played a wide range of starring and supporting roles, including comic characters, romantic leads, anti-heroes and villains.

Siddique made his acting debut with the film Aa Neram Alppa Dooram (1985). He got a break with the comedy film In Harihar Nagar (1990). Due to its success, he acted in a variety of comic roles during the early-1990s in films such as Godfather, Manthrikacheppu, Simhavalan Menon, Kasargode Khadarbhai, Thiruthalvaadi, Mughamudra, Kunukkitta Kozhi, and Welcome to Kodaikanal. Siddique turned to more serious roles with Asuravamsam and Lelam. He also did a notable villain role in Sathyameva Jayathe (2000), which led to a succession of similar roles.

In 2004, he was awarded the Kerala State Film Award for Best Supporting Actor for his performances in Sasneham Sumitra and Choonda. Siddique ventured into production by co-producing the film Nandanam (2002) under Bhavana Cinema. In 2013, he received the Nandi Special Jury Award for Naa Bangaaru Talli.

== Personal life ==
Siddique Mamathu was born on 1 October 1962 in Kochi, to Mamathu of the Kolliyil house.

Siddique's brother Abdul Majeed is also an actor who appears in Malayalam films. His son Shaheen Siddique is also an actor, who appears predominantly in Malayalam films. His younger son Rasheen died in June 2024 due to respiratory disorder.

== Career ==
Siddique started his career in the late 1980s with minor roles. His major break came in 1990 when, along with Mukesh, Jagadeesh, and Asokan, he was cast as one of the heroes in In Harihar Nagar. The movie, directed by Siddique and Lal, went on to become a huge box office success, starting a streak of similar low-budget comedy movies featuring the cast. Siddique became an essential part of such movies along with Mukesh and Jagadeesh. Films in the genre included Manthrikacheppu (1992), Simhavalan Menon (1995), Kasargode Khadarbhai (1992), Thiruthalvaadi (1992), Mughamudra (1992), Kunukkitta Kozhi (1992), Mookkillarajyathu (1991), Mimics Parade (1991), Grihapravesam, Welcome to Kodaikanal (1992), Kavadiyattam (1993), Kaattile Thadi Thevarude Ana (1995), Marupuram (1990), Varaphalam (1994), Mukha Chithram (1991) and Kinnaripuzhayoram (1994). He was cast alongside leading actresses of the time like Parvathy, Shobana, Sunitha, Mathu, and Suchithra. His performance in Godfather by Siddique-Lal was positively received by Malayalam movie viewers. Siddique also did action roles in some films. For example, there is the case of Ayalathe Adheham, where he was actually the villain only to be revealed at the climax of the movie. In Ekalavyan he played the role of Sarath, a young police officer, supporting Suresh Gopi.

The mid-1990s did not go well for Siddique as a number of personal problems affected his career. He made a comeback in the late 1990s with supporting roles in Asuravamsam with Manoj K. Jayan, and in Lelam and Crime File (both with Suresh Gopi). These films ensured his return to the mainstream. In Sathyameva Jayathe, he played a cold-blooded villain with Suresh Gopi. Following the success of this film, Siddique was offered a number of opportunities to play villains.

During this period, he also acted in television serials. His role in Sthree with Vinaya Prasad was a huge hit among Malayalam television audiences. He also anchored a musical programme called Sallapam on Doordarshan. Siddique has also anchored other musical programmes including Sangeetha Samagamam in Amrita TV and Symphony in Kairali TV, in the 2000s.

In 2002, he produced Nandanam, directed by Ranjith. The movie featured young actors Prithviraj Sukumaran and Navya Nair. Siddique appeared in a small but completely different role in the film. This was a box-office hit despite the absence of major stars.

Siddique started appearing in a number of different looks in his later films. This can be seen in films such as Chota Mumbai, Hallo, Nadiya Kollappetta Rathri, Udayon, Vellinakshatram, The Tiger, and Alibhai.

He encouraged director Lal to create the sequel to In Harihar Nagar. The movie 2 Harihar Nagar was released in 2009 with the middle-aged actors Jagadeesh, Mukesh, and Asokan coming together. Again in 2010, he appeared in the series' third installment, In Ghost House Inn.

In April 2011, Siddique launched Kerala's first family magazine Family Facebook.

== Controversy ==
The sexual assault charges stem from a complaint filed by an actress who alleged that Siddique raped her at a hotel in Thiruvananthapuram in 2016. the incident but came forward after the explosive Hema Committee report was released. The Kerala Police issued a lookout notice for Malayalam actor Siddique, suspecting he may have fled the state. This comes after his pre-arrest bail plea in a rape case was rejected by Kerala High Court. A Special Investigation Team (SIT) was formed to investigate the case. During interrogations, Siddique claimed ignorance about the whereabouts of his phone, which was allegedly with him on the night of the incident. The SIT expressed dissatisfaction with his lack of cooperation and indicated their intention to seek custody.

== Awards ==
Award	Year	Category	Film	Result
Kerala State Film Awards	2003	Second Best Actor	Sasneham Sumithra	Won
Kerala State Television Awards	2005	Best Actor	Samasya Annu Mazhayayirunu	Won
Kerala Film Critics Award	2003	Second Best Actor	Sasneham Sumithra	Won
Kerala Film Critics Award	2017	Second Best Actor	Annmariya Kalippilaanu Kattappanayile Rithwik Roshan Sukhamayirikkatte	Won
Nandi Awards	2013	Special Jury Award	Naa Bangaaru Talli	Won
Filmfare Awards South	2003	Best Film (Malayalam)	Nandanam	Won
SIIMA	2016	Best supporting actor (Malayalam)	Pathemari	Won
Asianet Film Awards	2003	Best Film	Nandanam	Won
Asianet Film Awards	2006	Best Actor in Villain Role	Bada Dhosth Prajapathi	Won
Asianet Film Awards	2008	Best Actor in Villain Role	Madampi	Won
Asianet Film Awards	2011	Best Actor in Villain Role	August 15	Won
Asianet Film Awards	2013	Best Supporting Actor	Drishyam	Won
Asianet Film Awards	2018	Best Supporting Actor	Hey Jude	Won
Asianet Film Awards	2020	Best Supporting Actor	Uyare	Won
Asiavision Movie Awards	2014	Second Best Actor	Drishyam	Won
Vanitha Film Awards	2011	Best Actor in a Negative Role	Pokkiri Raja	Won
Vanitha Film Awards	2017	Best Actor in a Supporting Role	Kattappanayile Rithwik Roshan Annmariya Kalippilaanu	Won
Vanitha Film Awards	2020	Best Character Actor	Uyare Vijay Superum Pournamiyum	Won
Asianet TV Awards	-	Best Actor	Sthree	Won
Amrita Film Awards	2008	Best Actor in a Supporting Role	Nadiya Kollappetta Rathri Ali Bhai; Paradesi	Won
Amrita Film Awards	2009	Best Negative Role	Various	Won
Malayala Puraskaram	2020	Best Actor	Subharathri	Won
Mazhavil Entertainment Awards	2024	The Entertainer of the Year in Negative Role	Neru	Won

=== Other awards ===
- 2008: Kairali World Malayalee Council Malayalam Film Award for Best Villain (Twenty:20, Madambi)
- 2009: Asiavision Annual Television Award Dubai for Best Musical Programme Presenter (Sangeetha Sangamam, Amritha TV)
- 2012: Naval Base Kerala Library Singalore's "Simhapuri Award" for the contribution to the Art and Culture

== Television ==
TV shows as host

- Sallapam (Doordarshan)
- Samagamam (Amrita TV)
- Sangeetha Samagamam (Amrita TV)
- Symphony (Kairali TV)
- Pachakuthira (Kairali TV)

TV serials as actor

- Sthree (Asianet)
- Venalkkalam (Asianet)
- Chila Kudumba chitrangal (Kairali TV)
- Black and White (Asianet)
- Vava (Surya TV)
- Innale (Asianet)
- Sindhooram (Asianet)
- Samasya ( DD Malayalam)
- Annu Mazhayayirunu (Amrita TV)
- Nokketha Doorathu (Asianet)
- Sthree (part-2) (Asianet)
