= List of Malayalam films of 1994 =

The following is a list of Malayalam films released in the year 1994.

Title	Director	Cast	Screenplay
Parinayam	Hariharan	Mohini, Vineeth, Manoj K. Jayan	M. T. Vasudevan Nair
Varaphalam	Thaha	Mukesh, Sreenivasan, Maathu, Thilakan	B. Jayachandran
Pavithram	T. K. Rajeev Kumar	Mohanlal, Shobana, Vinduja Menon	P. Balachandran
Bharya	V. R. Gopalakrishnan	Jagadish, Urvashi	
Bharanakoodam	Sunil	Babu Antony, Geetha	Sab John
Sudhinam	Nissar	Jayaram, Madhavi, Dileep	Babu Janardhanan
Chukkan	Thampi Kannanthanam	Suresh Gopi, Gautami, Thilakan	Babu Pallassery
Napoleon	Saji	Babu Antony, Maathu	
Sukham Sukhakaram	Balachandra Menon	Balachandra Menon, Shammi Kapoor, Urvashi, Geetha	
Gentle Man Security	J. Williams	Babu Antony, Moon Moon Sen	
Kashmeeram	Rajeev Anchal	Suresh Gopi, Priya Raman, Sharada, Tej Sapru	A. K. Sajan
Bheesmacharya	Cochin Haneefa	Manoj K. Jayan, Siddique, Narendra Prasad	Cochin Haneefa
CID Unnikrishnan B.A., B.Ed.	Rajasenan	Jayaram, Jagathy, Maniyanpilla Raju, Chippy	Sasidharan Arattuvazhi
Commissioner	Shaji Kailas	Suresh Gopi, Shobana, Ratheesh	Renji Panicker
Chief Minister K. R. Gowthami	Babu Raj	Vijayaraghavan, Geetha	
Thenmavin Kombath	Priyadarshan	Mohanlal, Nedumudi Venu, Shobana	Priyadarshan
Rajadhani	Joshy Mathew	Babu Antony, Geetha, Charmila	
Kadal	Siddique Shameer	Babu Antony, Charmila	
Pingami	Sathyan Anthikkad	Mohanlal, Kanaka, Thilakan	Reghunath Paleri
Gandheevam	Sab John	Siddique, Napoleon	
Malappuram Haji Mahanaya Joji	Thulasidas	Mukesh, Siddique, Maathu, Madhu	
Chanakya Soothrangal	Somanathan	Nedumudi Venu, Menaka	
Ilayum Mullum	K. P. Sasi	Thilakan, Pallavi Joshi, Shanthi Krishna	
The City	I. V. Sasi	Suresh Gopi, Urvashi	T. Damodaran
Vishnu	P. Sreekumar	Mammootty, Shobana	Venu Nagavally
Kudumba Vishesham	Anil Babu	Jagadish, Thilakan, Urvashi	
Puthran	Jude Attipety	Biju Menon, Chippy, Rohini	
Pakshe	Mohan	Mohanlal, Shobana, Shanthi Krishna	Cheriyan Kalpakavadi
Vendor Daniel State Licency	Balu Kiriyath	Thilakan, Jagadish, Chippy, Jagathy Sreekumar	
Nandini Oppol	Mohan Kupleri	Geetha, Sunitha, Siddique, Nedumudi Venu, Ganesh	
Cabinet	Saji	Vijayaraghavan, Sukumaran, Baiju, Ratheesh	
Varanamalyam	Viji P. Nair	Siddique, Santhikrishna	
Paalayam	T. S. Suresh Babu	Manoj K. Jayan, Urvashi,	Dennis Joseph
Kinnaripuzhayoram	Haridas	Sreenivasan, Siddique, Devayani, Mukesh	Priyadarshan, Gireesh Puthenchery
Dadha	P. G. Viswambaran	Babu Antony, Santhikrishna, Charuhasan	
Minnaram	Priyadarshan	Mohanlal, Shobana, Thilakan	Priyadarshan
Sainyam	Joshi	Mammootty, Mukesh, Priya Raman, Mohini, Vikram	S. N. Swamy
Vardhakya Puranam	Rajasenan	Manoj K. Jayan, Kanaka, Narendra Prasad, Janardhanan	Sasidharan Arattuvazhi
Njan Kodiswaran	Jose Thomas	Jagadish, Vinodini	
Pavam I. A. Ivachan	Roy P. Thomas	Innocent, Srividya, Jagadish, Siddique, Jagathy	
Sagaram Sakshi	Sibi Malayil	Mammootty, Sukanya	A. K. Lohithadas
Rudraksham	Shaji Kailas	Suresh Gopi, Annie, Geetha, Vijayaraghavan	Ranjith
Pidakkozhi Koovunna Noottandu	Viji Thampi	Urvashi, Manoj K. Jayan, Vinaya Prasad, Kalpana	Sasidharan Arattuvazhi
Manathe Vellitheru	Fazil	Vineeth, Shobana, Mukesh, Sreenivasan	Fazil
Shudhamaddalam	Thulasidas	Mukesh, Madhurima, Vijayakumar	
Chakoram	M. A. Venu	Santhi Krishna, Murali	A. K. Lohithadas
Gamanam	Sriprakash	Thilakan, Lakshmi	
Swaham	Shaji N. Karun	Ashwini, Bharath Gopi, Kalamandalam Haridas	
Kambolam	Baiju Kottarakkara	Babu Antony, Charmila, Vinu Chakravarthy, Ponnambalam	
Manathe Kottaram	Sunil	Suresh Gopi, Dileep, Khushbu	Robin Thirumala
Sukrutham	Harikumar	Mammootty, Shanthi Krishna, Gautami	M. T. Vasudevan Nair
Santhanagopalam	Sathyan Anthikkad	Jagadish, Thilakan, Balachandra Menon, Chippy	Raghunath Paleri
Kochaniyan			
Ponthan Mada	T. V. Chandran	Mammootty, Naseeruddin Shah	T. V. Chandran
Bhaagyavaan	Suresh Unnithan	Sreenivasan, Sithara	
Sraadham	V Rajakrishnan	Charuhasan, Karamana Janardhanan Nair	
Galileo	James Joseph	Narendra Prasad, M. R. Gopakumar	
Vidheyan	Adoor Gopalakrishnan	Mammootty, M. R. Gopakumar	
Kabooliwala

== Dubbed films ==
Title	Director	Story	Screenplay	Cast
Hey Hero	Raghavendra Rao			Chiranjeevi, Nagma
Chiranjeevi	Kodi Ramakrishna			Chiranjeevi, Bhanupriya
Ladies Only	Singeetam Srinivasa Rao			Revathy, Urvashi
