= Indrans =

Indian actor (born 1956)

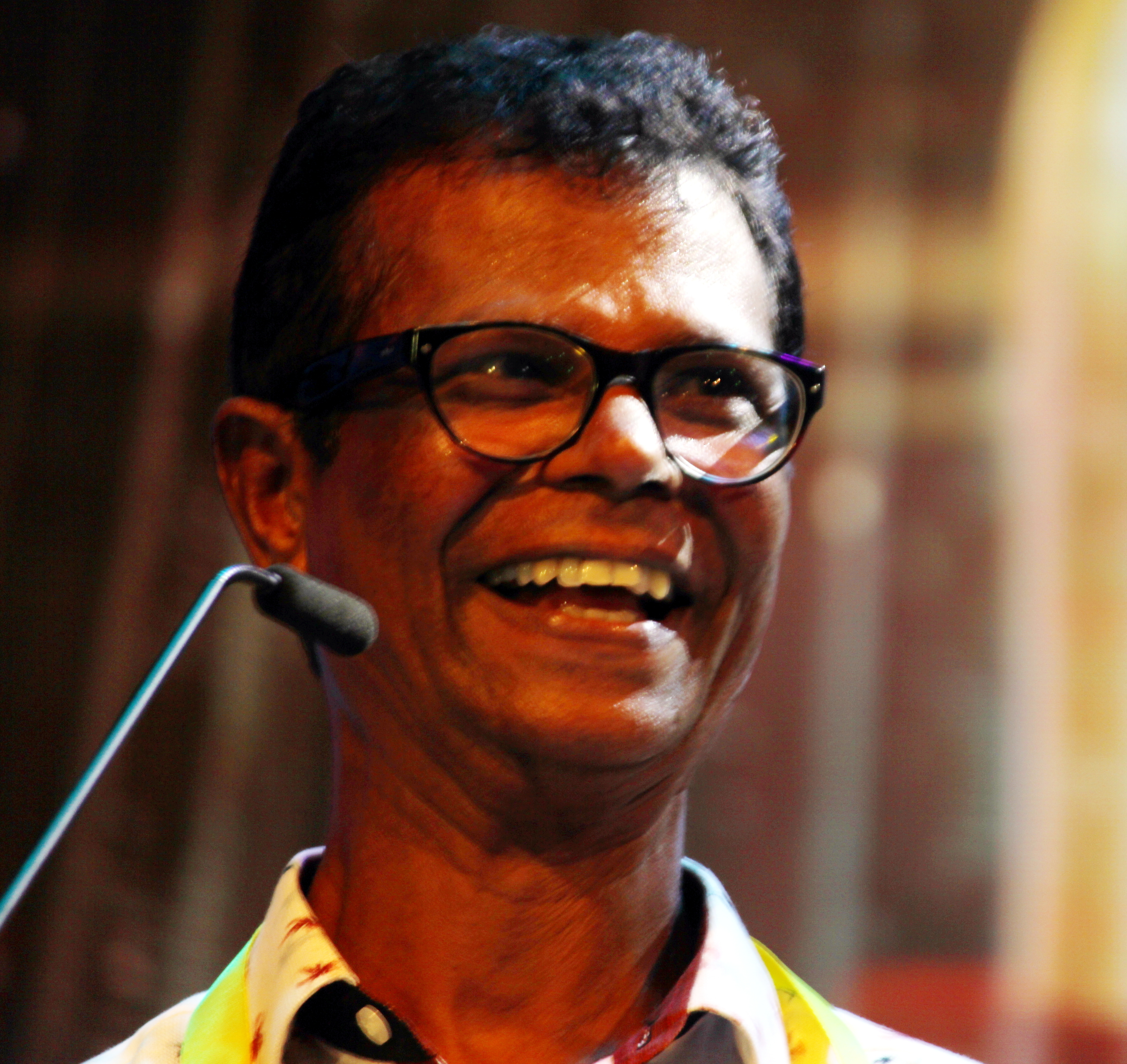
- Indrans in 2018
- Born: K. Surendran; 16 March 1956 (age 70); Thiruvananthapuram, Kerala, India
- Occupations: Actor; costume designer
- Years active: 1981–present
- Spouse: Shantakumari (m. 1985)
- Children: 2
- Awards: National Film Awards (2021); Kerala State Film Awards (2017)

Kochuvelu Surendran (born 16 March 1956), better known by his stage name Indrans, is an Indian actor and former costume designer, who appears in Malayalam films. He started his film career as a costume designer and actor in 1981 and got a breakthrough in 1994 with the comedy movie CID Unnikrishnan B.A., B.Ed. Indrans was popular for his comedy roles in the 1990s and 2000s.

He found success in playing character roles in his later career and won the National Film Awards-Special Mention for his performance in Home in 2023 and the Kerala State Film Award – Special Mention for Apothecary in 2014. In 2018, Indrans won the Kerala State Film Award for Best Actor for his performance in Aalorukkam. His performance in Veyilmarangal won him the Best Actor Award at the 2019 Singapore International Film Festival. As of November 2021, he had starred in over 550 films.

== Early life ==
Indrans was born on 16 March 1956. He is third among the seven children of Palavila Kochuvelu and Gomathi at Kumarapuram, Thiruvananthapuram. He has four sisters and two brothers.

Indrans faced financial problems at his house and had to join his uncle to learn tailoring. Later, he joined amateur arts clubs and began acting in dramas. He started his acting career in television serial Kaliveedu in Doordarshan. Along with his brother, K. Jayakumar, he opened a tailoring shop named Indran's Brothers Tailors in Kumarapuram, Thiruvananthapuram.

== Acting career ==
Indrans made his debut in the 1981 film Choothattam both as a costume designer and as an actor. The producer, TMN Charley, offered him a chance to assist him in costume designing and he worked with designing costumes for several years, acting in various small roles. He got noticed for playing a small role of a marriage broker in the 1993 film Meleparambil Anveedu. Indrans got his breakthrough with his role in CID Unnikrishnan B.A., BEd (1994). This led to him being cast in various comedic roles in the films of the 1990s. Indrans’ lean figure and peculiar way of delivering his dialogue and mannerisms made him a popular comedian in Malayalam cinema during these period. Some of his memorable roles came with the movies such as Malappuram Haji Mahanaya Joji, Manathe Kottaram, Vadhu Doctoranu, Aadyathe Kanmani, Aniyan Bava Chetan Bava etc. He played the character "Uthaman" in the 1998 cult hit Punjabi House. Indrans' combination with Harishree Ashokan resulted in some of the successful films.

In the early 2000s he also started playing some minor character roles. Subsequently, his role of a thief in the 2004 film Kathavasheshan got him noticed as a character actor. In Rahasya Police (2009), Indrans was revealed to be the villain of the movie at the end. He played another villain role in Pottas Bomb (2013). Indrans won the Kerala State Film Award – Special Mention for his performance in the 2014 film Apothecary.

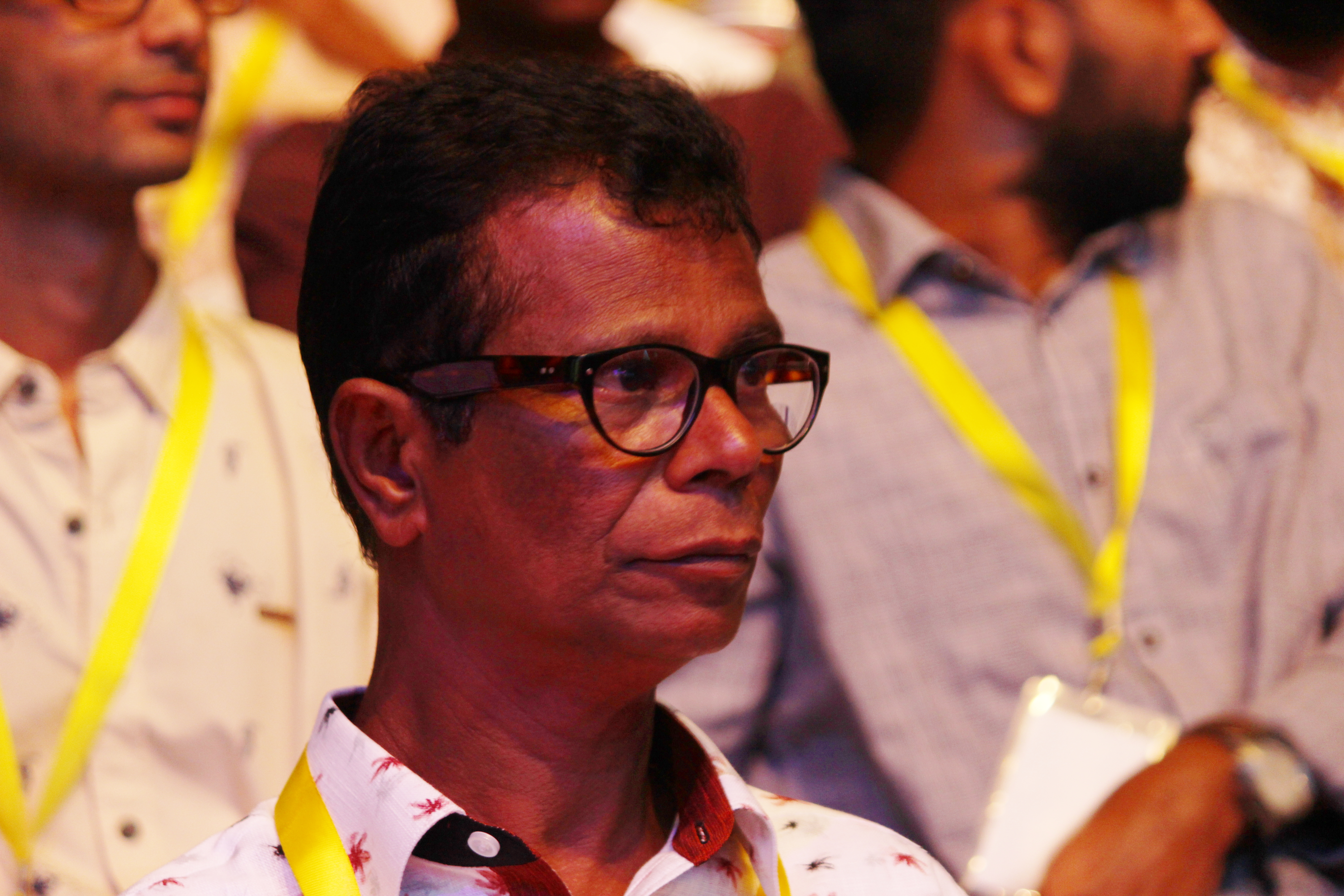
Indrans in 2018

In 2016, Indrans got noticed for his portrayal of a serious role, in the film Mundrothuruth, directed by Manu. After this movie, he played several serious character roles. He appeared in serious avatars in Kaadu Pookunna Neram (2016) and God Say (2017). Indrans played several notable roles in films such as Makkana, Lonam, Paathi and Buddhanum Chaplinum Chirikkunnu. In 2018, he won the Kerala State Film Award for Best Actor for his performance in the 2017 film Aalorukkam. In 2019, he was awarded Singapore South Asian International Film Best actor award for his performance in Veyilmarangal. Veyil Marangal also won the Outstanding Artistic Achievement at the Shanghai International film festival. Indrans played the lead role in the movie Mohabbathin Kunjabdulla (2019). His brief cameo as the serial killer Ripper Ravi in the crime thriller Anjaam Pathiraa (2020) was critically acclaimed.

In 2021, he played the lead role of Oliver Twist in Home. The movie was well acclaimed by the critics and audience especially praising Indrans' performance.

== Personal life ==
Indrans married Santhakumari on 23 February 1985. They have a daughter Mahitha and a son Mahendran.

Indrans' autobiography, titled Indradhanussu, was serialised in Mathrubhumi Illustrated Weekly and published as a book in 2024 by Mathrubhumi Books. The work earned him the Cherukad Award for the year 2024.

== Awards ==
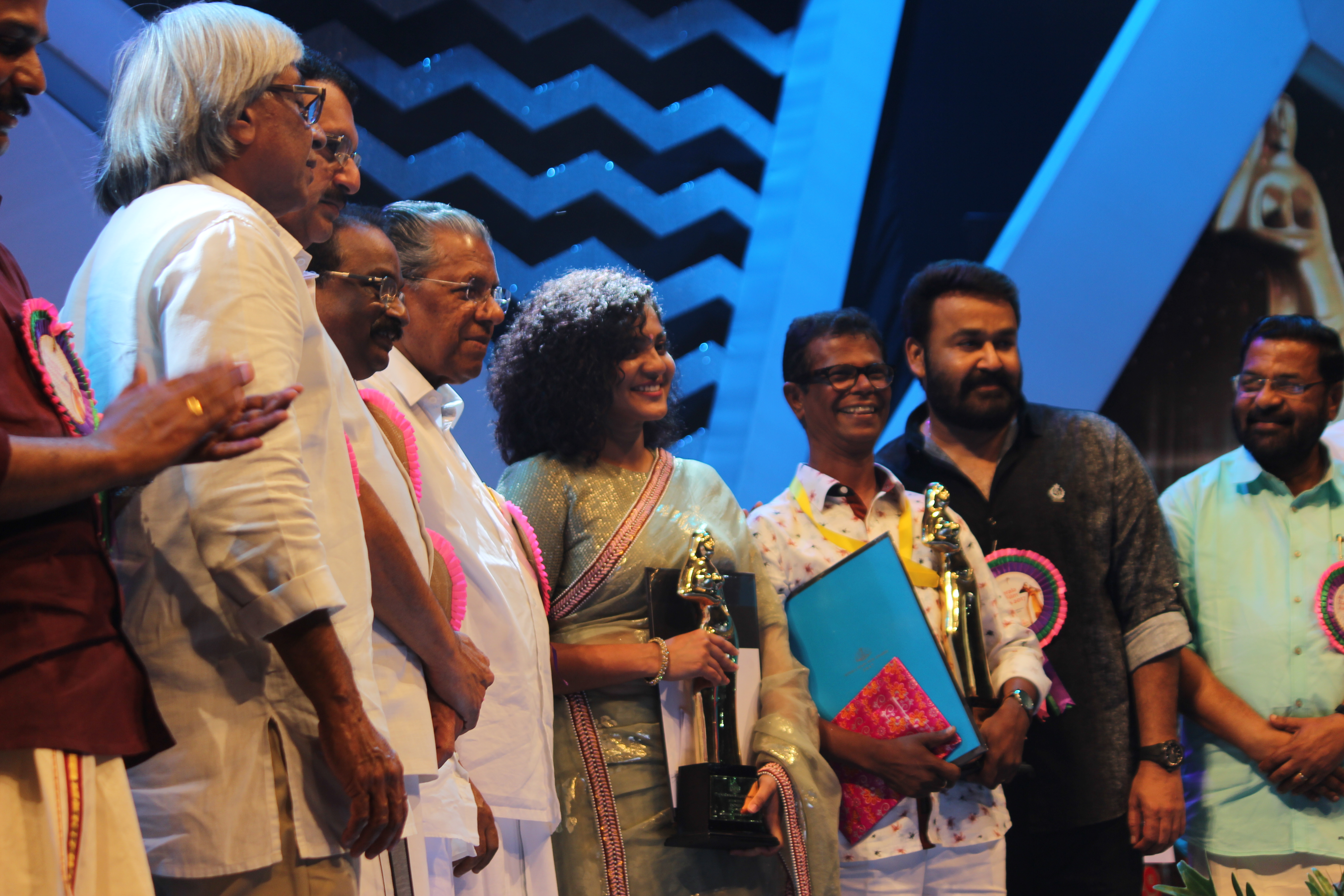
Indrans after receiving Kerala State Film Award for Best Actor in 2018

- 2014 - Kerala State Film Award – Special Mention for the film Apothecary
- 2016 - CPC Cine Awards – Special Honorary Award
- 2018 - Kerala State Film Award for Best Actor for the film Aalorukkam
- 2019 - Singapore South Asian International Film Festival Best actor award for Veyilmarangal
- 2019 - Shanghai International Film Festival Award for Best Film
- N.N. Pillai Smaraka Puraskaram (N.N. Pillai Memorial Award)
- 2023 - National Film Awards-Special Mention for the film Home
- 2023 - 68th Filmfare Awards South - Best Supporting Actor – Malayalam for the film Udal
- 2024 - Cherukad Award - Indradhanussu (Autobiography)

== Filmography ==
=== Actor ===
==== Malayalam ====
===== 1980s =====
Year	Title	Role	Notes
1981	Choothaattam		Also costume designer
1985	Jwalanam		
1985	Sammelanam	Man at toddy shop	
1985	Principal Olivil		
1987	Sarvakalasala		
1987	Nombarathi Poovu		
1988	Moonnam Pakkam		
1988	Aparan	Postman	
1989	Innale	Hospital Attendant	
1989	Aazhikkoru Muthu	Ice cream Seller	
1989	Jaathakam	Card Player	

===== 1990s =====
Year	Title	Role	Notes
1990	His Highness Abdullah		
1990	Rajavazhcha		
1990	Maala Yogam	Kochu Raman	
1991	Ezhunnallathu	Watch shop owner	
1991	Dhanam	Sasidharan	
1992	Aadharam	Divakaran	
1992	Ayalathe Addeham	Abu	
1992	Kaazhchakkppuram	Tea Shop Worker	
1992	Utsavamelam	Gopalan	
1993	Aagneyam	Rajappan	
1993	Janam	Party Member	
1993	Aparna		
1993	Ponnuchami	Velappan	
1993	Akashadoothu	Driver	
1993	Ithu Manjukaalam		
1993	Kavadiyattam	Tea Shop Employee	
1993	Meleparambil Anveedu	Marriage Broker Paramasivam	
1994	CID Unnikrishnan B.A., B.Ed.	Kunju	
1994	Malappuram Haji Mahanaya Joji	Sankaran	
1994	Moonnam Loka Pattalam	Prashna Kumaran	
1994	Manathe Kottaram	Appu	
1994	Pavam I. A. Ivachan		
1994	Varaphalam	Auto Driver	
1994	Vadhu Doctoranu	Natheli	
1994	Vardhakya Puranam	Kattanam Kuttikrishnan	
1994	Santhanagopalam		
1994	Vendor Daniel State Licency	Sundaran	
1995	Aadyathe Kanmani	Narayanankutty	
1995	Sundari Neeyum Sundaran Njanum		
1995	Aniyan Bava Chetan Bava	Balan	
1995	Avittam Thirunaal Aarogya Sriman	Mangalan Mankombu	
1995	Kalamasseriyil Kalyanayogam	Palarivattam Philipose	
1995	Mangalyasootram	Lorry Bhaskar	
1995	Parvathy Parinayam	Blackbelt Kumaran	
1995	Thumboli Kadappuram	Pushpangathan	
1995	Tom & Jerry		
1995	Radholsavam		
1995	Kalyanji Anandji	Maniyan	
1995	Kusruthikaatu	Arogya Swami	
1995	Mangalam Veettil Manaseswari Gupta	Dasan	
1995	Mannar Mathai Speaking	Ponnappan	
1995	Mazhavilkoodaram	Sundareshan	
1995	Punnaram		
1995	Spadikam	Gafoor	
1995	Prayikkara Pappan	Vettukili	
1995	Chaithanyam		
1995	Thovalapookkal		
1995	Three Men Army	'Basha' Surendran	
1995	Alancheri Thamprakkal		
1995	Thirumanassu		
1995	Peter Scott	Sheru	
1995	Kokkarakko		
1995	Street		
1995	Kakkakum Poochakkum Kalyanam	Balakrishnan	
1995	Manassasthrajnante Diary		
1996	Dilliwala Rajakumaran	Parameswaran	
1996	Hitlist	Devandarji	
1996	Mayooranritham		
1996	The Porter	Prashna Kumaran	
1996	Excuse Me Ethu Collegila		
1996	Kaathil Oru Kinnaram	Rameshan/Rajappan	
1996	Kalyana Sowgandhikam	Krishnankutty	
1996	Kinnam Katha Kallan		
1996	Pallivaathukkal Thommichan		
1996	Kanjirapally Kariyachan		
1996	Mandrika Kuthira		
1996	Man of the Match	'Neerkoli' Narayanan	
1996	Sathyabhamakkoru Premalekhanam	Purushothaman	
1996	Kudumbakodathi	Adv. Punjapadam Pushpangathan	
1996	King Solomon		
1996	Dominic Presentation	Velayudan	
1996	April 19	Chandran Pilla	
1996	Sugavaasam		
1996	Sulthan Hyderali		
1996	Swapna Lokathe Balabhaskaran	Kunjunni Anjarakalyanam	
1997	The Car	Idiyan Vikraman	
1997	Ekkareyanente Manasam	Bhargavan	
1997	Rishyasringan	Driver	
1997	Shobhanam		
1997	My Dear Kuttichathan		
1997	Kilukil Pambaram	Sakshi Sadananthan	
1997	Fashion Parade		
1997	Irattakuttikalude Achan		
1997	Kottappurathe Koottukudumbam	Balan	
1997	Guru Sishyan		
1997	Junior Mandrake	Driver Gopalan	
1997	Aattuvela		
1997	Nee Varuvolam		
1997	Hitler Brothers	Balaraman	
1997	Katha Nayakan	Sreedharan	
1997	Kalyana Unnikal		
1997	Manthramothiram	Sundareshan	
1997	Vaachalam	Vasu	
1998	Alibabayum Arara Kallanmarum	E. T. Lukose	
1998	Gramapanchayath	Bhaskaran	
1998	Manthri Kochamma		
1998	Kottaram Veettile Apputtan	Ramankutty	
1998	Malabaril Ninnoru Manimaaran		
1998	Punjabi House	Uthaman	
1998	Kusruthi Kuruppu	Suppan	
1998	Harthaal		
1999	Gaandhiyan	Udumbumchola Narayanan	
1999	Auto Brothers	Induchoodan	
1999	Swastham Grihabharanam	Vilakkoothi Vasu	
1999	James Bond	Shankarankutty	
1999	American Ammayi	Kuttapan	
1999	Friends		
1999	Indulekha		
1999	Pattabhishekam	Kuttishankaran	
1999	Jananayakan	Thottapilli Thoma	
1999	Onnaamvattam Kandappol		
1999	Chandranudikkunna Dikhil	Chandrappan	
1999	Vasanthiyum Lakshmiyum Pinne Njaanum	Unni Balan	

===== 2000s =====
Year	Title	Role	Notes
2000	High Range		
2000	Darling Darling	Achu	
2000	Ente Priyappetta Muthuvinu		
2000	Shayanam		
2000	Sathyam Sivam Sundaram	Sashankan	
2000	Sahayathrikakku Snehapoorvam		
2000	Pilots		
2000	The Warrant	Narayanan	
2000	Summer Palace		
2000	Vinayapoorvam Vidhyaadharan	Peon Kuttappan	
2000	Nadan Pennum Natupramaniyum	Ganeshan	
2000	Aanamuttathe Aangalamar	Manmadan	
2000	Neelakashathe Nizhal Pakshikal		
2000	Mark Antony	Antony's friend	
2000	Priyam	Unni's Assistant	
2001	Agrahaaram		
2001	Raajapattam		
2001	Vezhambal		
2001	Onnam Raagam	Jackson	
2001	Korappan The Great		
2001	Kakkakuyil		
2001	Jwalanam		
2001	Akashathe Paravakal	Kuttappan	
2001	Ennum Sambhavami Yuge Yuge		
2001	Nalacharitham Nalaam Divasam		
2001	One Man Show	Achuthan	
2001	Fort Kochi		
2001	Bharthavudyogam	Madhavan	
2001	Uthaman	Abdulla Haji	
2001	Megasandesam	Thommy	
2001	Nagaravadhu		
2001	Rakshasa Rajavu	Kochukuttan	
2002	Nizhalkkuthu	Barber	Serviteur de Kali, Le (France); Shadow Kill (International: English title)
2002	Jagathy Jagadeesh in Town	Moosa	
2002	Suvarna Mohangal		
2002	Ee Bhargavi Nilayam		
2002	Adheena		
2002	Kayamkulam Kanaaran		
2002	Pakalppooram	Manikyan's friend	
2002	Kattuchembakam	Aandi	
2002	Kakke Kakke Koodevide		
2002	Kuberan	Abdu	
2002	Oomappenninu Uriyadappayyan	Madhavan	
2002	Snehithan	Studio Owner	
2002	Valkannadi	Kanaran	
2002	Videsi Nair Swadesi Nair	Kochu Preman	
2003	The Fire		
2003	Kalavarkey	Moosakka	
2003	Achante Kochumolu	Lucko	
2003	Varum Varunnu Vannu	Echappan	
2003	Pattalam	Velayudhan	
2003	Balettan	Koya	
2003	Meerayude Dukhavum Muthuvinte Swapnavum	Chandran	
2003	C.I.D. Moosa	Theekkanal Varkey	
2003	Vellithira	Iyamkutty	
2003	Saudaamini		
2004	Priyam Priyankaram		
2004	Govindankutty Thirakkilanu	Arumukham	
2004	Kadhavaseshan	Thief Thorappan Vasu	
2004	Chathikkatha Chanthu	Pappan	
2004	Kanninum Kannadikkum	M. A. Chengamangalam	
2004	Vellinakshatram	Palace Manager Kochunni	
2004	C.I. Mahadevan 5 Adi 4 Inchu	Narayanan	
2004	Kusruthi	Champion Bhaskaran	
2004	Thalamelam	Nakulan	
2005	Kalyana Kurimanam		
2005	OK Chacko Cochin Mumbai	Kumbalam Sasi	
2005	Seelabathi	Vasu/Basu	
2005	Finger Print		
2005	Hai		
2005	Bus Conductor		
2005	Vacation		
2005	Kalyana Kurimanam	Balan	
2005	Mayookham		
2005	Nerariyan CBI	Devaswam	
2005	Ponmudipuzhayorathu	Supran	
2005	Pandippada	Veeramani	
2005	Kochi Rajavu	Canteen Manager	
2005	Athbhutha Dweepu	Chandrappan	
2005	Iruvattam Manavaatti	Chandrappan	
2005	Udayananu Tharam	Vijayan Varkala	
2005	Kadha	Dr. Aravindaksha Kaimal	
2006	Drishtantham		
2006	Mouryan		
2006	Kilukkam Kilukilukkam	Bakkar	
2006	Vrindaavanam		
2006	Narakasuran	Bheeman	
2006	Mahasamudram	Kapyar	
2006	Pachakuthira	Abraham Lincoln	
2006	Madhuchandralekha	Lukose	
2007	Indrajith	Radhakrishnan	
2007	Panthaya Kozhi	Rajappan	
2007	Nanma	Naanu	
2007	Kangaroo	Chellappan	
2007	Black Cat	Washington	
2007	Veeralipattu	Ramu	
2007	Athisayan	Swami	
2008	Novel		
2008	Crazy Gopalan	Sugunan	
2008	Kabadi Kabadi	Basheer	
2008	Magic Lamp	Sankaranunni	
2008	Bullet	Premasulal	
2008	Vilapangalkkappuram	Bheeran	
2008	De Ingottu Nokkiye	Vettikkadu Sugunan	
2008	Kovalam		
2008	Sivapuram		
2008	Oru Pennum Randaanum	Mathai	Segment: Kallante Makan
2008	Robo	Vijayan	
2008	Mayakazhcha	Ramakrishnan	
2008	Twenty:20	Govindan	
2009	Venalmaram	Chinkaram	
2009	Colours	Kuttiraman	
2009	Rahasya Police	Raveendran	
2009	Patham Nilayile Theevandi		
2009	Bharya Onnu Makkal Moonnu	Moidheen	
2009	Kancheepurathe Kalyanam	Kancheenadhan	
2009	Patham Adhyayam		
2009	Paribhavam		
2009	Swapnamaalika		
2009	Utharaswayamvaram	Chellappan	
2009	Dalamarmarangal	Noolan Damu	
2009	Shudharil Shudhan	Ramankunju	

===== 2010s =====
Year	Title	Role	Notes
2010	Chitrakkuzhal		
2010	Tournament	Tribal man	
2010	Oru Small Family	Kuttan	
2010	Sahasram	Kochukuttan	
2010	Ramaanam	Eramullanikka	
2010	Canvas	Shailan	
2010	Thaskara Lahala		
2010	Inganeyum Oral		
2010	Avan		
2010	Advocate Lakshmanan – Ladies Only		
2010	Aakasha Yathra		
2010	Annarakkannanum Thannalayathu		
2010	Thoovalkattu		
2010	Kadaksham		
2010	April Fool	Knjana Sheelan	
2010	Nanthuni		
2010	Cheriya Kallanum Valiya Policum	Mani	
2011	Innanu Aa Kalyanam	College staff	
2011	Sandwich	Brusli Sasi	
2011	Manikyakkallu	Sudhakaran	
2011	Killadi Raman		
2011	Pachuvum Kovalanum		
2011	Shivapuram		
2011	Kalabha Mazha		
2011	Manushyamrugam	Kapyaar Jackson	
2011	Kunjettan		
2011	Teja Bhai & Family	Raghavan Nair	
2011	Yathra Thudarunnu		
2011	Bhakthajanangalude Sradhakku		
2011	Lucky Jokers	Thamarakshan	
2011	Nadakame Ulakam	Dasettan	
2012	Cobra	Tea seller	
2012	Lakshmi Vilasam Renuka Makan Raghuram		
2012	Red Alert		
2012	Poppins	Film Producer	
2012	Ozhimuri		
2012	916		
2012	Parudeesa		
2012	Manthrikan	Unniyathiri	
2012	Trivandrum Lodge		
2012	Prabhuvinte Makkal		
2012	Hero	Pallan	
2012	Ee Adutha Kaalathu	Babu	
2012	Mullassery Madhavan Kutty Nemom P. O.	Loppez	
2012	I Love Me	Advocate	
2013	Cowboy	Driver Krishnankutty	
2013	Dolls	Stephen Perera	
2013	For Sale	Madhu	
2013	Police Maman	Lukose	
2013	Good Bad & Ugly	Arogya Swami	
2013	Players (film)		
2013	Money Back Policy	Kumar	
2013	Isaac Newton S/O Philipose	Pattazhi Chandran	
2013	Kanyaka Talkies	Philippose	
2013	Vedivazhipadu	Rajappan	
2013	Nadodimannan		
2013	David & Goliath	Autha	
2013	Pottas Bomb	Rayappan	
2014	Swapaanam	Selvam	
2014	Mannar Mathai Speaking 2	Ponnappan	
2014	Praise the Lord	Chacko	
2014	Apothecary	Joseph	
2014	Odum Raja Aadum Rani		
2014	Karanavar		
2014	Snehamulloral Koodeyullappol		
2014	Oru Korean Padam		
2014	The Dolphins		
2014	Flat No.4B		
2014	Seconds	Shivan Kutty	
2014	Jalamsham		
2015	Kunjiramayanam	Paramu	
2015	Aadu	P.P. Sasi	
2015	Ennu Ninte Moideen	Vaidyar	
2015	Ammakkoru Tharattu		
2015	Lukka Chuppi	Narayanan	Cameo
2015	Oru Second Class Yathra	Govindan	
2015	Salt Mango Tree	Pavithran	
2015	My God		
2015	John Honai		
2015	Kukkiliyar		
2015	Aana Mayil Ottakam	Sajan	Segment: Fill in the blanks
2015	Utopiayile Rajavu	Velappan	
2015	Moonnam Naal		
2015	Vishwasam... Athallae Ellaam		
2015	Monsoon		
2015	3 Wicketinu 365 Runs		
2015	Call Me @		
2016	Maanasaandarapetta Yezdi	Philipose	
2016	Leela	Dasappappi	
2016	Pa Va	Kunju	
2016	Kaadu Pookkunna Neram	School Master	
2016	Amoeba		
2016	Mudhugauv	Pathmanabhan's alcoholic uncle	
2016	Pinneyum	Kuttan Pillai	
2016	Kappiri Thuruthu		
2016	Sivapuram		
2016	Popcorn	Balraman	
2016	Dhanayathra		
2016	Mohavalayam		
2016	Kolamass		
2016	Kanthantharam		
2016	Sukhamayirikkatte		
2016	Mannamkattayum Kariyilayum		
2016	Daffadar		
2016	Mundrothuruth		
2016	Buddhanum Chaplinum Chirikkunnu	Indraguptan	
2017	Chippy		
2017	C/O Saira Banu	Contract Supervisor	
2017	Puthan Panam	Kuruvi (Marthandan)	
2017	Alamara	Sriram Shetty	
2017	Chicken Kokkachi	Kallu's father	
2017	Rakshadhikari Baiju Oppu		
2017	Samarpanam	Sasi	
2017	Parava	Mujeeb's father	
2017	Chakkaramaavin Kombathu		
2017	God Say		
2017	Paathi	Kammaran	
2017	Aalorukkam	Pappu Pisharody	
2017	Paippin Chuvattile Pranayam		
2017	Nilavariyathe		
2017	Hello Dubaikaaran		
2017	Prakasan	Peon	
2017	Aana Alaralodalaral		
2017	Aadu 2	P.P. Sasi	
2018	Daivame Kaithozham K. Kumar Akanam		
2018	Aami	Narayanan	
2018	Kinar	Khadar Uppapa	Bilingual film
2018	Khaleefa		
2018	Sakhavinte Priyasakhi		
2018	Pathirakalam		
2018	Kala Viplavam Pranayam	Achuthan	
2018	Kalyanam	Varkey	
2018	Shirk		
2018	Lolans		
2018	Vikadakumaran	Sukumaran Pillai	
2018	Aabhaasam		
2018	Kammara Sambhavam	ILP Surendran	
2018	Chanakyathantaram		Cameo
2018	Premasoothram	Kochubaby	
2018	School Diary		
2018	Pettilambattra	Ramettan	
2018	Oru Pazhaya Bomb Kadha	Mohan	
2018	Mandharam		
2018	Ladoo	Judge	
2018	Dakini	Raju Bhai	
2018	Nithyaharitha Nayakan	Vasu	
2018	Aanakkallan	Balachandran Nair	
2019	Sidharthan Enna Njan	Velayudhan	
2019	Aangu Doore Oru Desathu		
2019	Padmavyuhathile Abhimanyu		
2019	Red Signal		
2019	Panth		
2019	Pengalila		
2019	Nalla Vishesham		
2019	Mottitta Mullakal		
2019	Kalikkoottukar		
2019	Virus	Razak	
2019	Janamaithri	S. I. Shibu	Lead role
2019	Kumbarees		
2019	Subharathri	A.C. Suresh	
2019	Oolu	Abhu	
2019	Manoharam	Varghese Ettan	
2019	Udalaazham	Moorthy	
2019	Vaarthakal Ithuvare	'Arival' Sughu	
2019	Freakens	Dr. Abdullakoya	
2019	Nalpathiyonnu (41)	Kuttan Mesthiry	
2019	Makkana		
2019	Mohabbathin Kunjabdulla	Kunjabdullah	Lead role
2019	Aniyankunjum Thannalayathu		
2019	Thrissur Pooram	Murugan (Tea Shop Owner)	
2019	My Santa	Krishnan	

===== 2020s =====
Year	Title	Role	Notes
2020	Anjaam Pathiraa	Ripper Ravi	
2020	Uriyadi	Head Constable Panchavarnaksharan Pilla	
2020	2 States	Judge	Cameo
2020	Kozhipporu	George	
2020	Maniyarayile Ashokan	Priest	
2020	Anan		
2020	Sayanna Varthakal	Raghavan	
2020	Veyilmarangal		
2020	Bhoomiyile Manohara Swakaryam	Abdu	
2021	Yuvam	Adv. Sreekanth Panicker	
2021	Aapahasyam		
2021	Vellam	Chandran	Cameo
2021	Anugraheethan Antony	Madhavan	
2021	Innu Muthal	Maniyappan	
2021	Velukkakka Oppu Ka	Velukkakka	Lead role
2021	Malik	C. I. George Zachariah	
2021	Home	Oliver Twist	Lead role
2021	Ellam Sheriyakum	Tailor	
2021	Madhuram	Ravi	
2021	Ooham		
2021	Karanakaran		
2022	Randu		
2022	Meppadiyan	Hajjiyar	
2022	Member Rameshan 9am Ward	Ormanakuttan	
2022	Karnan Napoleon Bhagath Singh	Ummar	
2022	Pada	Sakhaavu Kannan Mundoor	
2022	Naaradan	Judge Chothi	
2022	Aaraattu	Tabalist Balan	
2022	Archana 31 Not Out	Lord	
2022	Salute	Home Guard	
2022	Pathonpatham Noottandu	Kelu	
2022	19(1)(A)	Police Officer Mohanan	
2022	Puzhu	Mathachan	
2022	Jack N' Jill	Anthrappan	
2022	Udal	Kuttichayan	
2022	Kochaal	Constable Paulose	
2022	Vamanan		
2022	Malayankunju	Surendran	
2022	Palthu Janwar	Kochu George	
2022	Padavettu	Raghavan Mash	
2022	Gila		
2022	Eesho	Varghese	
2022	Aanandam Paramanandam	Divakara Kurup	
2023	Higuita	Kunjananthan master	
2023	Kaipola		
2023	Kadina Kadoramee Andakadaham	Hasaan	
2023	2018	Bhasi	
2023	Jackson Bazaar Youth	CI Sadashivam	
2023	Within Seconds	Kizhangu Mohanan	
2023	Pendulum	Amir's father	
2023	Valatty	Labrador	Voice only
2023	Jaladhara Pumpset Since 1962	Mani	
2023	Otta		
2023	Adrishya Jalakangal		
2023	Pulli	Bhaskaran	
2024	Anweshippin Kandethum	DYSP Krishnan Unni (SIT)	
2024	Nadikar	David's co-actor	Cameo
2024	CID Ramachandran Retd. SI		
2024	Kanakarajyam	Ramanadhan	
2024	Jamalinte Punjiri		
2024	Kunddala Puranam	Venu	
2024	Manorathangal	Kuttinarayanan	Segment: Swargam Thurakkuna Samayam
2024	Kuttante Shinigami		
2024	Anand Sreebala	Coroner's attender	
2025	Rekhachithram	Chandrappan	
2025	Pariwar	Bheeman	
2025	Nancy Rani	Mani	
2025	United Kingdom of Kerala	Fr. Michael	
2025	Private	Balan Marar	
2025	Kerala Crime Files 2	CPO Ambili Raju	Disney+ Hotstar web series
2026	Aashaan	Aashaan	
2026	Aadu 3: One Last Ride - Part 1	P.P. Sasi (present), Baaba (future), Valiya Kelu (past)	
2026	Bhishmar		
2026	Patriot	ASI Satheeshan	
2026	Chinna Chinna Aasai	Madhavan	
2026	Ananthan Kaadu	Krishnankutty	Bilingual film
2026	Khalifa: The Ruler	Hamsa	
2026	Titans †	TBA	

==== Tamil ====
Year	Title	Role	Notes
2005	Aadum Koothu	Manimegalai's ogler at the library	
2012	Nanban	Govindan	
2026	Karuppu	Mattancherry Sukumaran	
2026	O.M - Operation Mole †	TBA	

=== Costume designer ===
- Aniyatha Valakal (1980)
- Choothaattam (1981)
- Oru Madapravinte Katha (1983)
- Vanitha Police (1984)
- Sammelanam (1985)
- Principal Olivil (1985)
- Namukku Parkkan Munthiri Thoppukal (1986)
- Thoovanathumbikal (1987)
- Sarvakalasala (1987)
- Moonam Pakkam (1988)
- Aazhikkoru Muthu (1989)
- Season (1989)
- Innale (1989)
- Rajavazhcha (1990)
- Cheriya Lokavum Valiya Manushyarum (1990)
- Maala Yogam (1990)
- Njan Gandharvan (1991)
- Kaazhchakkppuram (1992)
- Ayalathe Addeham (1992)
- Kavadiyattam (1993)
- Bhagyavan (1993)
- Sphadikam (1995)
- Kalyana Uniikal (1997)

=== Singer ===
- Kadhanayakan (1997)

=== Television serials ===
1. Kadalinakare (Asianet)
2. Hukka Hua Mikkado (Asianet)
3. Ellaam Mayajaalam (Asianet)
4. Devimahatmyam (Asianet)
5. Pattukalude Paattu (Surya TV)
6. Sabarimala Sridharmashashtha (Asianet)
7. Nirupama Fans (Flowers TV)
8. Satyam Shivam Sundaram (Amrita TV)
9. Kaliveedu (Doordarshan)
10. Kunjammayum Koottukarum (Doordarshan)
11. Smarakasilakal (Doordarshan)
