= Ayalathe Adheham =

- Poster
- Directed by: Rajasenan
- Written by: Sasidharan Arattuvazhi
- Produced by: Mohan Kumar
- Starring: Jayaram; Gautami; Siddique; Vaishnavi; Meena; Thilakan
- Cinematography: Prathapan
- Edited by: G. Murali; Sreeraj
- Music by: Perumbavoor G. Raveendranath (Songs); Mohan Sithara (Score)
- Production company: Kairali Films Productions
- Distributed by: Arthri Films
- Release date: 1992
- Running time: 138 minutes
- Country: India
- Language: Malayalam

Ayalathe Adheham (transl. The gentleman next-door) is a 1992 Indian Malayalam-language family comedy drama film directed by Rajasenan and written by Sasidharan Arattuvazhi. It stars Jayaram, Gautami, Siddique, Vaishnavi, Meena, and Thilakan. The music for songs was composed by Perumbavoor G. Raveendranath, while the lyrics were written by Mohan Sithara.

== Plot ==
The story is about a college lecturer Premachandran, who faces troubles when his wife Sulochana develops an inferiority complex about their family life, after seeing their happily married neighbours Rajeevan and Radhika. Rajeevan is a medical representative and working for a pharmaceutical company. Rajeevan's personality, confidence and his charisma impresses Sulochana and she wishes her husband was like Rajeevan.

Sulochana keeps on comparing Rajeevan with her husband to such an extent that it makes Premachandran irritated. Premachandran tries to mend his behaviour and tries his best to express his love for Sulochana but fails in his attempts.

Rajeevan is revealed to be a fraudster who has an extra marital relationship with one of their neighbours and everything adorable about his family life was a cover-up. Sulochana realizes her husband's sincere love towards her.

== Cast ==
- Jayaram as Premachandran / Preman, Malayalam College Lecturer
- Gautami as Sulochana, Premachandran's Wife
- Siddique as Rajeevan, medical representative
- Vaishnavi as Radhika, Rajeevan's Wife
- Meena as Premachandran's Mother
- Thilakan as Sivan Pillai, Bank Manager
- Jagathy Sreekumar as Chandykkunju / Chandy, Video Shop Owner and Residence Association Secretary
- Krishna Prasad as Sudheendran, Sulochana's Brother
- Santhakumari as Rajeevan's Mother
- Babu Namboothiri as David Gomez, Premachandran's Colleague
- Ramyasree as Gomathy, Sivan Pillai's Wife
- Maniyanpilla Raju as Achuthan Singh
- Indrans as Abu, Chandikkunju's Assistant
- Alummoodan as Rajeevan's Father
- Mamukkoya as Kuttappan
- Mala Aravindan as Selvam
- Jose Pellissery as Joseph
- Kumarakom Reghunath as SI Firoz
- Vishnuprakash as Dr. Perera
- Thesni Khan

== Production ==
When Rajasenan was in search of a story, Sasidharan narrated the plot of Ayalathe Addeham which was originally rejected by Kaladharan who instead agreed to the plot of Nettipattam.

== Box office ==
The film was commercial success. It was well received by family audiences.
