= Kudumbakodathi =

- Directed by: Viji Thampi
- Written by: Sasidharan Arattuvazhi
- Produced by: V. S. Suresh
- Starring: Innocent; Dileep; Ashokan; Kalpana
- Cinematography: Sanjeev Shankar
- Edited by: Sreekar Prasad
- Music by: S. P. Venkatesh
- Production company: Chithram Films
- Distributed by: Chithram Films
- Release date: 18 January 1996
- Country: India
- Language: Malayalam

Kudumbakodathi (transl. Family Court) is a 1996 Indian Malayalam-language comedy film, directed by Viji Thampy and produced by V. S. Suresh. The film stars Innocent, Dileep, Ashokan, and Kalpana in the lead roles. The film has a musical score by S. P. Venkatesh.

== Plot ==
N.D. Raman Nair a.k.a. NDR is a successful businessman who is very stingy and makes his two sons work at home as maids. He insults them at the slightest pretext in public and at home. Both the boys have no courage to stand up to him. They have no jobs and live on the mercy of their father. The boys, Ramanan and Rameshan, marry their girlfriends Pournami and Panchami, respectively. The girls were rivals from college and their enmity spills into their home. After the wedding, the boys become subdued husbands and the family spirals into fights and acrimony. Raman, marries a second time and brings home wife who sets about correcting the atmosphere at home with a firm hand.

== Cast ==
- Innocent as Naarakatharayil Damodaran Nair Raman Nair aka N. D. R
- Dileep as Rameshan Nair, NDR's Younger Son
- Ashokan as Ramanan Nair, NDR's Elder Son
- Kalpana as Guntoor Parvathy
- Rudra as Pournami Nair, Ramanan's Wife
- Mohini as Panchami Panicker, Rameshan's Wife
- Harishree Ashokan as Sarathy Kumaran, NDR's Driver and Rameshan and Ramanan's Friend
- Indrans as Adv.Punjapadam Pushpangathan, NDR's Legal Advisor
- Jagathy Sreekumar as Paramanandan Nair, Pournami's Father
- Zainuddin as Swami Laxmananda, NDR's younger brother
- Spadikam George as Impeechi, Guntoor Parvathy's Brother
- Jagannadha Varma as Rishikeshan Nair, NDR's Friend
- Augustine as Sivan, Drama Artist
- N. L. Balakrishnan as Jambulingam Ashan
- Meena Ganesh as Guntoor Parvathy's Mother
- Priyanka as Charulatha Pournami's Servent
- Kuttiyedathi Vilasini as Chandramathi Panjami's Servent
- Poojappura Radhakrishnan as Food Inspector
- Bindu Varappuzha

== Soundtrack ==
The music was composed by S. P. Venkatesh, and the lyrics were written by S. Ramesan Nair.

No.	Song	Singers	Lyrics	Length (m:ss)
1	"Dum Dum Thirumukham"	M. G. Sreekumar	S. Ramesan Nair	
2	"Pandathe Meesha" (Hey Mooliyalankaari)	K. S. Chithra, Kalpana	S. Ramesan Nair	
