= Apoorvam Chilar =

1991 Indian Malayalam film

- Directed by: Kala Adoor
- Written by: S. N. Swamy
- Screenplay by: S. N. Swamy
- Produced by: Akbar
- Starring: Innocent; Jagathy Sreekumar; Parvathy; Sai Kumar; Jagadish; KPAC Lalitha; Ganesh Kumar
- Cinematography: Prathapan
- Edited by: V. P. Krishnan
- Music by: Johnson
- Production company: Relax Combines
- Distributed by: Evershine Release
- Release date: 1991
- Country: India
- Language: Malayalam

Apoorvam Chilar (transl. A Rare Few) is a 1991 Indian Malayalam film, directed by Kala Adoor and produced by Akbar. The film stars Innocent, Jagathy Sreekumar, Parvathy, Sai Kumar, Jagadish and KPAC Lalitha in the lead roles. The film has musical score by Johnson.

== Plot ==
The movie revolves around a corrupt Government contractor, Pathrose who tries to gain control over everything that surrounds him. He is very afraid and feels that Jesus Christ is speaking to him. He develops enmity towards the incorruptible Shankara Warrier.

== Cast ==
- Innocent as Idanilam Pathrose
- Jagathy Sreekumar as Shankara Warrier
- Parvathy as Annie Pathrose
- KPAC Lalitha as Marykutty, Pathrose's wife
- Sai Kumar as Dr. Suresh Warrier
- Jagadish as Subhramanian
- Kaviyoor Ponnamma as Sarojam, Shankara Warrier's wife
- Ganesh Kumar as Benny
- Mala Aravindan as Mathukutty, Pathrose's driver
- Oduvil Unnikrishnan as Thekedathu Tharian Punoose
- Ashokan as Aby Punnoose
- Valsala Menon as Saramma
- Usha as Hema
- Mamukkoya as Rajan
- Paravoor Bharathan as Krishnan Nair
- Bobby Kottarakkara as Velappan
- T. P. Madhavan as Chandran
- Manu Varma as Raju Pathrose

== Soundtrack ==
The music was composed by Johnson and the lyrics were written by Kaithapram.

No.	Song	Singers	Lyrics	Length (m:ss)
1	"Chenthaaram Poothu"	Sujatha Mohan, Chorus	Kaithapram	
2	"Sakalamaana"	M. G. Sreekumar, Chorus	Kaithapram	
