= American Ammayi =

- DVD cover
- Directed by: G. K. Gouthaman
- Written by: G. K. Gouthamn
- Starring: Jagathy Sreekumar; KPAC Lalitha; Kalpana; Prem Kumar
- Music by: Sanjeev Lal
- Production company: G. G. Gogul Productions
- Release date: 18 February 1999
- Country: India
- Language: Malayalam

American Ammayi (transl. American Aunt) is a 1999 Indian Malayalam-language film written and directed by G. K. Gouthaman. The film stars Jagathy Sreekumar, K. P. A. C. Lalitha, Kalpana and Prem Kumar in the lead roles. The film has musical score by Sanjeev Lal.

== Cast ==
- Jagathy Sreekumar as C. M. Sugunan
- KPAC Lalitha as Sharada Nair, Devan's mother
- Kalpana as Thresia
- Prem Kumar as Devan
- Chandni Shaju as Sridevi
- Janardanan as Menon
- Indrans as Kuttapan
- Poojappura Ravi as Keshu Nair
- Sindhu as Diana
- Philomina as Naani
- Kaviyoor Renuka as mother of Sridevi

== Soundtrack ==
The music was composed by Sanjeev Lal and the lyrics were written by Bharanikkavu Sivakumar.

No.	Song	Singers	Lyrics	Length (m:ss)
1	"Aadyathe Kuttumon"	Ranjini Jose, Prabhakar	Bharanikkavu Sivakumar	
2	"Ammaayi Ammaayi"	Udayan	Bharanikkavu Sivakumar	
3	"Chithraponnoonjaalil"			
4	"Raagamazhiyil Ilam Thooval Kuliril"	Sindhu, Udayan, Rekha Rajiv	Bharanikkavu Sivakumar	
5	"Thanka Nilaavil"			
