= Sammelanam =

- Directed by: C. P. Vijayakumar
- Written by: C. P. Vijayakumar(story); Nedungadu Radhakrishnan (dialogues)
- Screenplay by: Nedungadu Radhakrishnan
- Produced by: Basheer
- Starring: Shankar; Menaka; Jalaja
- Cinematography: Vijaya Kumar
- Music by: Maharaja
- Production company: Khadeeja Productions
- Distributed by: Khadeeja Productions
- Release date: 2 November 1985
- Country: India
- Language: Malayalam

Sammelanam (transl. Conference) is a 1985 Indian Malayalam film, directed by C. P. Vijayakumar and produced by Basheer. The film stars Shankar, Menaka and Jalaja in the lead roles. The film has musical score by Maharaja.

== Cast ==
- Shankar as Ramankutty
- Menaka as Shalini
- Jose Prakash as Shalini's father Ananthan Nambiar
- Jalaja as Salma
- Santhakumari as Basheer's mother
- Captain Raju as Basheer (Boatman)
- Jagathy Sreekumar as Thankappan
- Poojappura Ravi
- Indrans as man in a toddy shop (cameo)
- Bheeman Raghu
- Soorya as Radha

== Plot ==
Ramankutty alias Ramu was released from jail after serving imprisonment for a falsely accused murder case. He plans to take revenge on those who had put him in jail. First he attacked the one who gave false witness against him in the court, and that fellows colleagues were behind him. While running for his life, he finds Basheer who is about to take leave in his small canoe. Basheer asks Ramu to get into his canoe and on the way they are again attacked and Basheer is wounded. As his last wish he pleads Ramu to keep the news of his death a secret from his ailing mother and sister Salma who is about to get married. As instructed by Basheer, Ramu disposes of the corpse.

Ramu traces Basheer's house and gave the dress and gold handled by Basheer, and mentions that Basheer will return in a day or two. On request from Basheers mother Ramu stays there. Salma is accepted by those who had come with a proposal and they decide to go ahead with the marriage. Ramu mentions that he needs a job and will be doing the job of boatman. While waiting in his canoe for passenger, Shalini who was his ex lover boards the canoe. She mentions that for solitude she sometimes stays in a house owned by his father in that area. In her house only her father and some dogs are there. Ramu drops Shalini and then old memories get cherished. Ramu works in a factory owner by Shalini's father Ananthan Nambiar. As the trade unions plan for strike in the factory demanding wage hike, Ramu gets the news of the union leader being found dead in the nearby river. Ramu thinks it as a plan by Ananthan and goes to Ananthan Nambiars house. he pushes Shalini and she falls down hurt. When enquired by the maid, she mentions that she has slipped and fall. Later in the day Ramu learns that the death was accidental as the man had drunk excessively before jumping into the river. Ramu is now hired as driver for Ananthan Nambiar's personal car. While taking Shalini to hospital to treat the injury multiple times, they both fall in love. However, when Ananthan Nambiar finds it, he opposes and Ramu is fired, thus ending their love story.

In the meantime Salma's marriage gets fixed. Ramu reveals to Shalini that he had a sister Radha, and since their house was big, they leased part of it to a medical representative. However he was flirtatious and had tried to fool his sister Radha. Radha fells but when identifies later that he was a flirt, she opposes to spend time with him. Irritated with her behaviour he tries to push her to bed. But Radha kills herself. Soon Ramu reaches there to find the dead body of her sister. During verdict he was accused of misbehaving with his sister and killing her. So Ramu is now in search of that person to take revenge. Shalini forces him to forgive everything and he wants the old Ramu. Shalini is also invited for Salmas marriage.

On the day of Salma's marriage, Shalini informs Ramu that she is returning to her native as her husband is returning from overseas. She did not have any expectations about her husband. But now he had mentioned in postal letter that he is returning to live with her. Ramu was shocked to hear it, and wishes good life to Shalini. He then returns as the newly wedded couple Salma is set to go. As they take leave via the boat, Ramu notices that the person who is responsible for the death of his sister is approaching via another boat. They both fights and as they hear Shalini calling out to Ramu, they stop the fight. However Ramu hits him on his head and he breathes his last. It is then understood that he is her husband.

== Soundtrack ==
The music was composed by Maharaja and the lyrics were written by Bichu Thirumala.

No.	Song	Singers	Lyrics	Length (m:ss)
1	"Azhakezhum Kadanjeduthoru"	K. J. Yesudas, P. Susheela	Bichu Thirumala	
2	"Jeevitha Nadiyude"	K. J. Yesudas	Bichu Thirumala	
3	"Oodum Paavum"	P. Susheela	Bichu Thirumala	
4	"Oodum Paavum"	K. J. Yesudas	Bichu Thirumala	
5	"Thakkaalikkavilathu"	Chorus, Vilayil Valsala	Bichu Thirumala	
