= CID Unnikrishnan B.A., B.Ed. =

1994 film directed by Rajasenan

- Theatrical release poster
- Directed by: Rajasenan
- Written by: Sasidharan Arattuvazhi
- Produced by: Mani C. Kappan; T.K. Devakumar
- Starring: Jayaram; Maniyanpilla Raju; Jagathy Sreekumar; Rohini; Sukumaran; Indrans
- Cinematography: Anandakuttan
- Edited by: K. P. Hariharaputhran
- Music by: Johnson
- Production companies: Rajalakshmi Productions; Okay Productions
- Distributed by: Okay Pictures
- Release date: 11 April 1994
- Running time: 150 minutes
- Country: India
- Language: Malayalam

CID Unnikrishnan B.A. B.Ed. (Malayalam: CID ഉണ്ണികൃഷ്ണന്‍ B.A. B.Ed) is a 1994 Indian Malayalam-language mystery comedy film starring Jayaram, Maniyanpilla Raju, Jagathy Sreekumar, Rohini, Indrans and Sukumaran. This film was written by Sasidharan Arattuvazhi and directed by Rajasenan. It was made as an homage to CID Nazir (1971). The film was also a breakthrough in the career of Indrans. In the film, Unnikrishnan, a young man gets hired in a private detective company; soon, he is given the task of investigating a businessman's daughter's record. But during the course of his investigation, he faces opposition from two detectives who work with the same company.

== Plot ==
Unnikrishnan, "Unni" is a B.A. graduate in a village who wants to become a secret agent like his idol, Prem Nazir who had acted in various movies as a detective. His parents and his girlfriend Dhamayanthi support him, but Unnikrishnan still cannot find a job. Dhamayanthi's father, who is a friend of Unni's father arranges a trainer Rishikeshan Nair to train Unni. Rishikeshan Nair who told everyone that he was a trainer in a police training academy was actually a cook in the academy canteen. After a few days, Rishikeshan Nair absconds with some valuables from Unni's house. Unnikrishnan later gets selected as a trainee in a private detective agency called Secret Files. The Boss assigns Unni a task of investigating Arundhathi, the daughter of a businessman Ananthapadmanabhan, "Ananthan" as an assignment to evaluate him. While investigating with his friend and sidekick Kunju he faces two rivals, Prem Shankar, who poses as a gentleman who pretends to love Arundhathi, and Oommen Koshy, who is a working as a gardener in her house. They are from the same detective agency investigating the same case as the boss says that whoever does best will be selected to the agency. All three try to investigate in their own ways. Unnikrishnan poses as a salesman of Peter & Peter, and befriends Ananthapadmanabhan. He manages to make a bad impression about Prem Shankar in front of Ananthapadmanabhan. Oommen tries to flirt with the cook Clara. From Ananthan, Unni learns that Arundhathi has had a deadly disease from childhood and she has to take medicines regularly. That's the reason she is still unmarried. After Arundhathi's birthday party, she catches Oommen and makes him confess that he is in fact a private detective. Oommen tells her about others and she reveals to the three of them that she is in fact Revathi, Anathapadmanabhan's niece. The actual Arundhathi is in US, doing her studies. Dejected, the trio decide to quit the investigation. But Prem Shankar, who has started to develop feelings towards Revathi, asks the help of the other two to find out Revathi's ailment. They learn that she is actually healthy and the medicines she has been taking from childhood were just vitamin tablets. They kidnap Ananthan's family doctor and he reveals to them that Ananthan wants Revathi unmarried as all the properties are of Ananthan's late brother, Revathi's father. To keep it as he wants, he fabricates a story about her ailment to convince her that she cannot live happily. They inform Revathi about this who is shocked to hear about her uncle's actual intentions. But Ananthan gets to know about these happenings and kidnaps Dhamayanthi, who had come to the city with her father as she was worried about Unni. Ananthan makes an offer to exchange Dhamayanthi for bond papers signed by Revathi that all the properties will belong to Ananthan. Revathi signs the papers and Dhamayanthi is rescued, but Unni burns the papers using a matchstick trick taught by Rishikeshan Nair. A fight occurs where all of Ananthan's men are defeated and Revathi asks them to spare Ananthan as she was brought up by him. In the end, all three are selected into the Secret Files and the boss asks them to take a case in Kashmir. All three say they need a vacation as they had found love. The movie ends with the three agreeing to take Unni's sidekick as their assistant.

== Cast ==
- Jayaram as CID Unnikrishnan B.A., B.Ed
- Maniyanpilla Raju as CID Prem Shankar M.A., LLB
- Jagathy Sreekumar as CID Oommen Koshy M.A., ML
- Chippy as Dhamayanthi, Unnikrishnan's love interest
- Rohini as Revathi, Prem Shankar's love interest and Arundathi's impostor
- Kalpana as Clara, Oommen Koshy's love interest
- Oduvil Unnikrishnan as Pappunni, Unnikrishnan's father
- K. P. A. C. Lalitha as Padmavathy, Unnikrishnan's mother
- Sukumaran as Ananthapadmanabhan, Revathi's uncle and the chief antagonist
- Narendra Prasad as the Boss of Secret Files
- Indrans as Kunju, Unnikrishnan's friend & assistant
- Kollam Thulasi as Dr. Ramachandran
- Janardhanan as Rishikeshan Nair
- Babu Namboothiri as Vasudevan, Dhamayanthi's father
- Bobby Kottarakkara as Eraniel Chinnappa
- Gayathri as Uma, Unnikrishnan's sister
- Swapna Ravi as Prabhavathy, Revathi's aunt
- Kalady Omana as Kamalakshi, Dhamayanthi's mother
- Narayanankutty as Tailor

== Soundtrack ==
The film had soundtrack composed by Johnson and lyrics by Bichu Thirumala and I. S. Kundoor.

Track	Song title	Lyrics	Singer(s)	Other notes
1	"Avani Poovin Ponmani"	I. S. Kundoor	P. Jayachandran, K. S. Chithra	
2	"Urukkinte Karuthulla"	Bichu Thirumala	K. J. Yesudas	
3	"Aarirvum Thaane Yezhu Swarangalaakki"	Bichu Thirumala	K. J. Yesudas, P. Jayachandran, Krishnachandran	

== Box office ==
The film was a commercial success.
