= Avittam Thirunaal Aarogya Sriman =

- Directed by: Viji Thampi
- Written by: Sasidharan Arattuvazhi
- Produced by: Radhakrishnan Vendothra
- Starring: Jagathy Sreekumar; Balachandra Menon; Shanthi Krishna; Jagadish; K.P.A.C.Lalitha
- Cinematography: Dinesh Babu
- Edited by: A. Sreekar Prasad
- Music by: S. P. Venkatesh
- Release date: 1995
- Country: India
- Language: Malayalam

Avittam Thirunaal Aarogya Sriman is a 1995 Malayalam film directed by Viji Thampi.

== Plot ==
Avittam Thirunal Achutha Kuruppu was a chief commander of the Maharaja's Nair Kshatriya army of the Princely State of Travancore. Now as an elderly man, he stays with his different children and extended family. His presence in these families is not well-taken. His nosy nature and gluttony irritates his family. His family members try to avoid him, not wanting to take care of the irksome elderly man. Prabhakaran, his brother's son, sees this and isn't able to agree with the families lack of love. He makes up a story that Achutha Kuruppu owns a somewhat fifty-acre rubber estate from the royal family. As the news arrives, the family's attitudes reverse's and all the fun begins.

== Cast ==
- Jagathy Sreekumar as Avittam Thirunal Achutha Kuruppu a.k.a. Valiya Padathalavan
- Balachandra Menon as Prabhakaran
- Shanthi Krishna as Hemalatha
- Jagadish as Sahadevan
- Viji Thampi as Arumukham Thampi
- K.P.A.C.Lalitha as Devayani
- Indrans as Mangalan Mankombu
- Kalpana as Kousalya
- Janardanan as Phalgunan Kuruppu
- Krishnan Kutty Nair as K.K. Kizhakkedam
- Philomina as Unutha
- Sudheesh as Nakulan
- Usha as Jalaja Kumari
- Shilpa Punnoose as Prabhakaran's daughter
