= Aalibabayum Aarara Kallanmarum =

- Directed by: Satheesh Manarkat; Shaji
- Written by: Sasidharan Arattuvazhi
- Produced by: Shreyas Cine Arts
- Starring: Jagadeesh; Vijayaraghavan; Jagathy Sreekumar; Kalpana; Kalabhavan Mani; Thejas Ramakrishnan
- Cinematography: Saloo George
- Edited by: P. C. Mohan
- Music by: Berny Ignatius; Background Score: S. P. Venkatesh; Lyrics: Gireesh Puthenchery
- Production company: Shreyas Cine Arts
- Distributed by: Soorya Cine Arts
- Release date: 1998
- Country: India
- Language: Malayalam

Aalibabayum Aarara Kallanmarum is a 1998 Malayalam comedy film directed by Satheesh Manarkat and Shaji. It stars Jagadeesh, Vijayaraghavan, Jagathy Sreekumar, Kalpana, Kalabhavan Mani, Sai Kumar, Rajan P. Dev, and Indrans.

== Cast ==
- Jagadeesh as Divakaran
- Vijayaraghavan as Sub Inspector Jayashankar
- Anju Aravind as Sunitha Divakaran
- Jagathy Sreekumar as Ithikkara Thanku
- Kalpana as Thanki
- Kalabhavan Mani as Palacharakku Chandy
- Sai Kumar as MLA Jose Parakkan
- Rajan P. Dev as Chathanadan
- Indrans as Advocate Lukose
- Mamukkoya as Head Constable Peeru Muhammed
- Bobby Kottarakkara as Police Constable Kuruvila
- V.D. Rajappan as Gold Gopalan
- Tony as Advocate
- Chali Pala as Udumbu Vasu
- Usha T.T. as Sunanda
- Poornima Anand as Raji Jayashankar
- Omana Ouseph as Jayashankar's mother
- Thrissur Elsy as Chandy's mother
- K.P.A.C. Premachandran
- Mani C. Kappan
- T.S. Raju as Ex MLA
- Thejas Ramakrishnan as Luttapi/Tuttu, Ithikkara Thanku's son
- Rajesh K Puthumana

== Soundtrack ==
The songs were composed by Berny–Ignatius.

Song	Singers	
1	"Pon Kinaakkal"	M. G. Sreekumar
