= Kilukil Pambaram =

- Directed by: Thulasidas
- Written by: Sasidharan Arattuvazhi
- Produced by: Kalliyoor Sasi; P. M. Basheer
- Starring: Jayaram; Jagathy Sreekumar; Kalyani; Vani Viswanath; Madhupal
- Cinematography: Venugopal
- Edited by: G. Murali
- Music by: S. P. Venkatesh
- Production company: United Vision
- Distributed by: Seven Star Release
- Release date: 31 January 1997
- Country: India
- Language: Malayalam

Kilukil Pambaram is a 1997 Indian Malayalam-language comedy drama film directed by Thulasidas and written by Sasidharan Arattuvazhi. The film stars Jayaram, Jagathy Sreekumar, Kalyani, Vani Viswanath and Madhupal. The film had musical score by S. P. Venkatesh.

== Synopsis ==
Anadapadmanabhan is hired by the government as the caretaker of the palace and assets because the legal heirs are murdered and there is a dispute regarding the tenure. He must fight to make sure that the property is safe.

== Cast ==
- Jayaram as Advocate Ananthapadmanabhan
- Jagathy Sreekumar as Urumis
- Kaveri (actress) as Rohini
- Vani Viswanath as Sugandhi
- Madhupal as Chithrapuram Mohana Varma
- Rajan P. Dev as Meledethu Narayana Kuruppu
- Paravoor Ramachandran as Mahadeva Varma
- Shivaji as Nandana Varma
- Indrans as Sakshi Sadananthan
- Kozhikode Narayanan Nair as Ramunni Nair
- Kanakalatha as Sugandhi's mother
- Kumarakom Raghunath as Advocate Sankara Narayanan
- Thikkurissy Sukumaran Nair as Ananthan's Grandfather
- Cherthala Lalitha as Ananthan's Mother
- Kalliyoor Sasi as Viswambaran
