= Vardhakya Puranam =

- Directed by: Rajasenan
- Written by: Sasidharan Arattuvazhi
- Starring: Manoj K. Jayan; Narendra Prasad; Jagathy Sreekumar; Janardhanan; Kanaka
- Cinematography: Venugopal
- Edited by: G.Murali
- Music by: Songs: Kannur Rajan; Background Score: S. P. Venkatesh
- Release date: 5 October 1994
- Country: India
- Language: Malayalam

Vardhakya Puranam (transl. An old-age saga) is a 1994 Indian Malayalam-language film directed by Rajasenan and written by Sasidharan Arattuvazhi. The film stars Manoj K. Jayan, Narendra Prasad, Jagathy Sreekumar, Janardhanan and Kanaka. The film featured songs composed by Kannur Rajan and film score by S. P. Venkatesh.

== Plot ==
Mahendran Thampi, Omanakuttan Pillai and Abraham Thomas are three lifelong friends who were employed in various gazetted government posts; Thampi being a Postal Department employee, Omanakuttan being a retired Meteorological Department officer and Thomas being a retired employee of the Animal Husbandry Department. After his own retirement, Thampi, an ardent fan of dramatic arts, expresses his desire to start a drama troupe as a way to make his retired life more engaging, and invites his friends into the endeavor. Omanakuttan and Thomas happily jump in to the bandwagon, but with some mischievous intentions as well.

Despite the doubt and outright objection from their families, especially Thampi's son Jayamohan, the trio start their troupe with help from writer Attakulangara Ambujakshan and troupe manager Kattanam Kuttikrishnan. They hire actors and after some effort find a lead actress in Rajani, a young girl who is returning to acting to support her ill father. Through senior actress Odanavattom Omana, the trio learn that Rajani quit acting after her husband Vysakhan caused problems in her previous troupes, but the trio disbelieve her after they meet Vysakhan and he appears decent towards them.

The troupe's first show is a hit and they get further shows. But soon they encounter problems one by one. One of the supporting actresses elopes with Omanakuttan's elder son Santhosh, and lead actor Alexander quits the troupe after he is slapped by Rajani for misbehaving with her. This forces Jayamohan, who was a talented actor in his college days, to take up the lead role to save the troupe, and gradually, he begins to appreciate the troupe, rekindling his lost passion for acting. Just when everything seems to be going well, Vysakhan returns and in a fit of rage, attacks Rajani, revealing his true self. To save the troupe from further harm, Rajani silently quits the troupe. Frustrated by the problems, Thampi, Omanakuttan and Thomas decide to close the troupe, but before they can, they are visited by Rajani's father, Harinarayanan. He reveals that Vysakhan is his former disciple, to whom he married Rajani thinking he was decent. But he turned out to be a drug addict, who began to incur multiple debts and forced Rajani to become an actress to fulfill his debts. Rajani left him after he tried to pimp her out to a drama troupe owner and seeks divorce. But Vysakhan refuses to divorce her, eyeing more money from her. Realizing Rajani's plight and how she needs this acting job to support her father, Jayamohan calls her back, despite some objection.

When Vysakhan returns to take her away, Jayamohan warns him from seeing her again, while realizing that he has fallen in love with her. Rajani, though loving Jayamohan back, refuses to put him or his family through more trouble and leaves again for a court hearing about her divorce. However, Vysakhan warns her from leaving him and seeing Jayamohan again, threatening to kill Jayamohan if she does. At the court, Rajani refuses a divorce to save Jayamohan and the troupe and agrees to go with Vysakhan, who intends to once again pimp her out. But before Vysakhan can take her away, Harinarayanan stabs Vysakhan to death at the court premises, in a final desperate act to save Rajani.

A few years later, Jayamohan has married Rajani, who is now pregnant with their child. As they are going to the hospital, they encounter Thampi, Omanakuttan and Thomas, who are still happily and actively running their drama troupe, and preparing for their newest play.

== Cast ==
- Narendra Prasad as Mahendran Thampi
- Jagathy Sreekumar as Omanakuttan Pillai
- Janardhanan as Abraham Thomas
- Manoj K. Jayan as Jayamohan Thampi
- Kanaka as Rajani
- Kanakalatha as Sumithra Omanakuttan
- Meena as Susanna Cherian
- Usha as Mollykutty
- Kaveri as Sathi
- Prem Kumar as Parimalan - Jayan's Friend
- Philomina as Odanavattom Omana
- Sudheesh as Satheesh
- Abi as Santhosh
- Aneesha as Thara
- T. R. Omana as Mahendran Thampi's Mother
- Adoor Bhavani as Thara's Grandmother
- Bharath Gopi as Harinarayanan, Rajani's Father
- Madhupal as Vysakhan
- Oduvil Unnikrishnan as Attakulangara Ambujakshan
- Indrans as Kattanam Kuttikrishnan
- Sonia Baiju as Malini Thankachi
- Kozhikode Narayanan Nair as Rajashekharan Thampi (Malini's Father)
- Gayathri as Jayanthi (Substitute of Thara)
- Appa Haja as Alexander

== Soundtrack ==
The music was composed by Kannur Rajan.

No.	Song	Singers	Lyrics	Length (m:ss)
1	"Veena Padum"	K. J. Yesudas	Ramesan Nair	04:22
2	"Paal Nilavil"	P.Jayachandran, K. S. Chithra	S. Rameshan Nair	
3	"Vallathoru Yogam"	S. P. Balasubrahmanyam	S. Rameshan Nair	
4	"Veena Paadum" (Bit)	K. J. Yesudas, P.Jayachandran, K. S. Chithra	IS Kundoor	
5	"Veena Paadum"	K. S. Chithra	IS Kundoor	
