= Jagathy Sreekumar =

Indian actor (born 1951)

- Born: Sreekumar Achary; 5 January 1951 (age 75); Jagathy, Thiruvananthapuram, Kerala, India
- Other name: Ambili
- Education: Mar Ivanios College, Thiruvananthapuram
- Occupations: Actor; director
- Years active: 1974– present
- Spouses: Mallika Sukumaran (m. 1974; div. 1976); Shoba (m. 1979); Kala Sreekumar
- Children: 3, including Rajkumar
- Parent: Jagathy N. K. Achary (father)

Sreekumar Achary (born 5 January 1951), better known by his stage name Jagathy Sreekumar or simply Jagathy, is an Indian actor, director and playback singer, who has appeared in over 1500 Malayalam films in a career spanning almost four decades. Widely regarded as one of the greatest actors in the history of Malayalam cinema, he is also known for his highly nuanced character roles. He is the son of acclaimed dramaturge and writer, Jagathy N. K. Achary.

Jagathy Sreekumar won five Kerala State Film Awards among numerous other awards for his roles in various films. He has also directed two films and written screenplays for two more. His stage name is derived from the neighborhood of Jagathy in Thiruvananthapuram from where he hails. He is an outspoken orator holding strong views, quite unlike his onscreen image and his speeches are still popular.

As the result of a vehicle accident in March 2012, Jagathy was hospitalized for over a year and has still not completely recovered from the injuries sustained. His film career has been on hold since the accident. In May 2022, Jagathy returned to the big screen with the CBI 5: The Brain directed by K. Madhu. In the film, he did not have any dialogues and reprised the memorable character CBI Vikram, which he played in the previous films of the CBI series.

== Early life and education ==
Jagathy Sreekumar is the eldest son of Malayalam dramatist and writer Jagathy N. K. Achary. He studied at the Government Model Boys School, Thiruvananthapuram. He then completed his B.Sc. degree in Botany from Mar Ivanios College, Thiruvananthapuram, where eminent personalities like K. Jayakumar and Ravi Vallathol were his classmates. After college, he briefly worked as a medical representative before later becoming an actor.

== Acting career ==
Jagathy was a fifth grade student at Model School in Thiruvananthapuram when he got the opportunity to act in a school play for the first time. The play he acted was "Onamundum Odakkuzhalum" by Sreemandiram K.P. He continued to act in plays written by his father NK Achary for Kalanilayam, in big and small roles. During this time he joined Mar Ivanios College, Thiruvananthapuram.

Jagathy made his debut in Malayalam cinema in 1974 by playing a small role in Kanyakumari. He got a breakthrough in his career with his second film Chattambi Kalyani (1975) where he played the role of Pappu. Since then, he went on to play comedy roles in numerous movies. Jagathy started to become an integral part of Malayalam cinema during the early 1980s. He was a constant fixture in Priyadarshan films with Mohanlal coming in the lead role in many of them. Jagathy-Mohanlal combo also resulted in some of the hit movies during the 1980s such as Poochakkoru Mookkuthi, Boeing Boeing, Aram + Aram = Kinnaram, Mazha Peyyunnu Maddalam Kottunnu, Hello My Dear Wrong Number, Thalavattam, Mukunthetta Sumitra Vilikkunnu and Ninnistham Ennishtam. Jagathy was praised for his performance as Kavala in the sentimental drama film Moonnam Pakkam (1988). The same year he starred in Mammootty starrer Oru C.B.I Diary Kurippu and reprised the character in the next four sequels of the CBI Series released in 1989, 2004, 2005 and 2022 respectively.

In 1991, Jagathy won the Kerala State Film Award For Second Best Actor for his performance in the cult classic comedy movie Kilukkam and Apoorvam Chilar. He played a comic character in Kilukkam whereas in Apoorvam Chilar, he played a character role. Jagathy played the role of a patient escaped from mental hospital with his group of friends in Mookilla Rajyathu (1991). This movie later developed a cult following. One of the best characters played by Jagathy is Arasumootil Appukuttan in Yoddha (1992). Yoddha is considered one of the best comedy films in Malayalam where Jagathy played an integral part in it. Jagathy was praised for his performance as Jayakrishnan in Melepparambil Aanveedu (1993). His lead role in Kabooliwala (1994) alongside Innocent was acclaimed. The duo played the characters called Kannas and Kadalas in the movie respectively. The same year he played another memorable role in Minnaram. His character from the movie Olympian Anthony Adam (1999) is popular.

Other notable movies in the 1990s include Nagarangalil Chennu Raparkam, Cheriya Lokavum Valiya Manushyarum (1990), Kottayam Kunjachan, Koodikazhca, Kadinjool Kalyanam, Georgekutty C/O Georgekutty (1991), Ezhara Ponnana (1992), Pidakkozhi Koovunna Noottandu, Vadhu Doctoranu, Pingami, Malappuram Haji Mahanaya Joji, Kinnaripuzhayoram, CID Unnikrishnan B.A., B.Ed (1994), Oru Abhibhashakante Case Diary, Vrudhanmare Sookshikkuka, Puthukottyile Puthu Manavalan, Kusruthikaatu (1995), Kalyana Sowgandhikam, Kaathil Oru Kinnaram (1996), Arjunan Pillayum Anchu Makkalum, Kilukil Pambaram, Junior Mandrake (1997), Meenathil Thalikettu, Kottaram Veettile Apputtan, Mangalya Pallakku, Mayilpeelikkavu, Grama Panchayath, Alibabayum Arara Kallanmarum, Sreekrishnapurathe Nakshathrathilakkam (1998), Udayapuram Sulthan, Vazhunnor, Tokyo Nagarathile Viseshangal, Pattabhishekam and Friends (1999).

Jagathy reunited with Priyadarshan with Kakkakkuyil (2001), which was a commercial success. Jagathy's role as Krishnavilasom Bhageeratan Pilla aka Pillechan in the comedy drama Meesa Madhavan (2002) is often considered one of his career best. This character as well as the movie itself eventually developed a cult following. Jagathy won his second Kerala State Film Award for his performance in Meesa Madhavan and for doing a character role in Nizhalkuthu. The same year he played another memorable comedy character Kumbidi in Nandanam. Some of his memorable roles in 2003 were in movies such as Mr. Brahmachari, Thilakkam, Kilichundan Mampazham, Sadanandante Samayam, Vellithira, Swapnam Kondu Thulabharam, C.I.D. Moosa, Meerayude Dukhavum Muthuvinte Swapnavum, Balettan, Hariharan Pillai Happy Aanu, Pulival Kalyanam and Pattanathil Sundaran. Jagathy's next film directed by Priyadarshan after Kilichundan Mambazham, was Vettam (2004), where he played a comic serial killer called Basha. Another popular comic character of Jagathy is Pachalam Bhasi in Udayananu Tharam (2005). In 2006, Jagathy reprised his role as Nischal in Kilukkam Kilukilukkam, the sequel of Kilukkam. However the movie was a commercial failure and received negative reviews. Jagathy's role as a fake human god known as Himavalswami in Makante Achan (2009) was acclaimed.

Jagathy's other successful comedy movies in the 2000s include Vellinakshatram (2004), Naran, Kochi Rajavu (2005), Classmates (2006), The Speed Track, Chota Mumbai, Hallo, Rock n' Roll (2007), Crazy Gopalan, Twenty:20 (2008), Sagar Alias Jacky Reloaded and Evidam Swargamanu (2009).

Jagathy's role as Member Ramanan in Elsamma Enna Aankutty (2010) was appreciated and the movie was a box office success. His other notable movies in 2010 and 2011 are Marykkundoru Kunjaadu and Pranchiyettan and the Saint. The last film he completed before he met with a road accident in 2012 was Parudeesa.

Jagathy has also played memorable character roles in numerous movies. Most of them have a comic shade while others are purely character roles. He played a complex character called Unnithan Aashan in Vaasthavam (2006). He won the Kerala State Film Award – Special Mention in 2007 for his performance in Paradesi and Veeralipattu. Jagathy played the lead role in Raamanam (2009) which earned him that years Kerala State Film Special Jury Award. Jagathy's other notable character roles are seen in movies such as Vesham (2004), Thanmathra (2005), Chess, Palunku (2006), Manchadikkuru (2008), Pazhassi Raja (2009), Indian Rupee (2011), Kerala Cafe (2009), Manikiakkallu (2011), Christian Brothers (2011), Janapriyan (2011) and 1993 Bombay, March 12 (2011).

Besides portraying comedic characters and comic roles, Jagathy has played characters with negative shades, including his roles as Chenicheri Kurup in Urumi (2011) and the Home Minister in Passenger (2009). Arabikkatha (2007), Makante Achan (2009) and Cycle (2008) are also movies with Jagathy in negative roles.

He made his comeback after his road accident, in the movie CBI 5: The Brain released in 2022, which was the fifth part of the Mammootty starrer CBI series.

== Personal life ==
Jagathy married Mallika in 1974 and divorced in 1976. He married Shoba in 1980. They have a son, Rajkumar, and a daughter, Parvathy. Just days before the March 2012 road accident, Jagathy had publicly revealed that he had a daughter, Sreelakshmi Sreekumar, with actress Kala, also said to be his third wife.

== Accident ==
On 10 March 2012, he was seriously injured in a road accident at Panambra near the Calicut University at Tenhipalam in Malappuram district. He was immediately rushed to Aster MIMS Hospital in Kozhikode, where he remained for one month. Later, he was taken to Christian Medical College, Vellore for advanced treatment. He underwent multiple surgical procedures. He remained in hospital for twelve months, appearing in public for the first time in March 2013, unable to speak. In 2014, he was again taken to Vellore for further check-ups and returned to his home later. Recently he appeared in a private channel during Onam with Nedumudi Venu in which he sang old songs.

== Awards ==
| Award | Year | Category | Film | Result |
|---|---|---|---|---|
| Kerala State Film Award | 1991 | Second Best Actor | Apoorvam Chilar; Kilukkam | Won |
| Kerala State Film Award | 2002 | Second Best Actor | Nizhalkuthu; Meesa Madhavan | Won |
| Kerala State Film Award | 2007 | Special Mention | Paradesi; Veeralipattu | Won |
| Kerala State Film Award | 2009 | Special Jury Award | Raamanam | Won |
| Kerala Film Critics Award | 1991 | Special Award | Kilukkam; Mukha Chithram | Won |
| Kerala Film Critics Award | 2007 | Second Best Actor | Classmates; Palunku; Vaasthavam | Won |
| Asianet Film Awards | 2002 | Best Supporting Actor | Meesa Madhavan | Won |
| Asianet Film Awards | 2004 | Lifetime Achievement Award | | Won |
| Asianet Film Awards | 2007 | Best Supporting Actor | Rock n' Roll; Hallo | Won |
| Filmfare Awards South | 2007 | Best Supporting Actor (Malayalam) | Vasthavam | Won |
| Jaihind TV Awards | 2011 | Abhinaya Samrat Award | | Won |
| Asianet Comedy Awards | 2015 | Lifetime Achievement Award | | Won |
| Mazhavil Entertainment Awards | 2024 | Ultimate Entertainer Award | | Won |

Other awards

- 2003 – Bahadoor Award for his contributions to Malayalam cinema
- 2005 – Prem Nazir Award for his contributions to Malayalam cinema spanning three decades
- 2005 – Sathyan Memorial Award
- 2009 – Utsav Film Awards Lifetime Achievement Award for overall contribution to Malayalam cinema
- 2011 – The Kochi Times Film Award - Best Actor in a Negative Role in Urumi
- 2012 – Thikkurussy Award for Most Popular Actor

== Partial filmography ==
=== 1950s ===
| Year | Title | Role | Notes |
|---|---|---|---|
| 1957 | Achanum Makanum | Vikraman | Child Artist |

=== 1970s ===
| Year | Title | Role | Notes |
|---|---|---|---|
| 1974 | Kanyakumari | Tourist | Debut film |
| 1975 | Chattambi Kalyani | Pappu | |
| 1975 | Mohiniyaattam | Ranjini's lover | |
| 1975 | Hello Darling | Vijayan | |
| 1977 | Sreedevi | Phalgunan | |
| 1977 | Poojakkedukkatha Pookkal | Chacko Mundurkonam | |
| 1977 | Santha Oru Devatha | | |
| 1977 | Aadhya Paadam | | |
| 1978 | Kalpavriksham | Saimon | |
| 1978 | Kaathirunna Nimisham | V. N. Kumaran | |
| 1978 | Madalasa | Nandagopal | |
| 1978 | Rowdy Ramu | Conductor | |
| 1978 | Etho Oru Swapnam | Engineer Janardhanan Nair | |
| 1978 | Mattoru Karnan | | |
| 1978 | Ashtamudikkaayal | | |
| 1979 | Ulkadal | Jayashankar | |
| 1979 | Puthiya Velicham | Parippuvada Kuttappan | |
| 1979 | Enikku Njaan Swantham | Kili Balan | |
| 1979 | Prabhatha Sandhya | | |
| 1979 | Koumara Praayam | Vasu | |
| 1979 | Avano Atho Avalo | Velappan | |
| 1979 | Venalil Oru Mazha | | |
| 1979 | Neeyo Njaano | Kaalan Muthu | |
| 1979 | Kazhukan | Amruthlal | |

=== 1980s ===
| Year | Title | Role | Notes |
|---|---|---|---|
| 1980 | Swathu | Vikraman Raja | |
| 1980 | Air Hostess | C I Damodharankutty | |
| 1980 | Agnikshetram | Thoma | |
| 1980 | Chandrahasam | Kumar | |
| 1980 | Sakthi | Thilakan | |
| 1980 | Manushya Mrugam | Anandan | |
| 1980 | Lava | Kuttappan | |
| 1980 | Kari Puranda Jeevithangal | Kunjappan | |
| 1980 | Paalattu Kunjikannan | Soldier | |
| 1980 | Ambalavilakku | Vasutty | |
| 1980 | Idimuzhakkam | Rajan Unnithan/Thyagacharya | |
| 1980 | Aniyatha Valakkal | Varghese | |
| 1980 | Ithile Vannavar | Sankarankutty | |
| 1980 | Pappu | | |
| 1981 | Kadathu | Meesha Vasu Pilla | |
| 1981 | Thakilu Kottampuram | Shishupalan | |
| 1981 | Karimpoocha | Pappu | |
| 1981 | Sanchari | Mani | |
| 1981 | Kattukallan | Mallan | |
| 1981 | Ellam Ninakku Vendi | Kuruppu | |
| 1981 | Sphodanam | Kuttan Pilla | |
| 1981 | Munnettam | Gopi | |
| 1981 | Agni Yudham | | |
| 1981 | Sangharsham | Unnikrishnan | |
| 1981 | Oothikachiya Ponnu | Vaasu | |
| 1981 | Ammakkorumma | IPS officer Bhadran | |
| 1982 | Yavanika | Varunan | |
| 1982 | Kaalam | Gopalan | |
| 1982 | Ethiralikal | Tube | |
| 1982 | Irattimadhuram | Unnikrishnan | |
| 1982 | Kaattile Paattu | Bombay Dharam | |
| 1982 | Olangal | | |
| 1982 | Kurukkante Kalyanam | Kumar | |
| 1982 | Kelkatha Shabdam | Kora | |
| 1982 | Ithu Njangalude Katha | Vasu | |
| 1982 | Chilanthivala | Sayippu | |
| 1982 | Karthavyam | Mohan Prakash | |
| 1982 | Njan Ekananu | Sreekumaran | |
| 1982 | Olangal | | |
| 1982 | Marupacha | Kumar | |
| 1982 | Raktha Sakshi | | |
| 1982 | Maattuvin Chattangale | Constable Rajappan | |
| 1982 | Snehapoorvam Meera | Karunan | |
| 1982 | Aranjaanam | Professor | |
| 1982 | Chillu | James | |
| 1982 | Balloon | | |
| 1983 | Nizhal Moodiya Nirangal | Nanappan | |
| 1983 | Mazhanilavu | Pushpangathan | |
| 1983 | Eettappuli | | |
| 1983 | Ankam | Ponnan | |
| 1983 | Rathilayam | | |
| 1983 | Mandanmmar Londanil | Rasheed | |
| 1983 | Oomai Kuyil | | |
| 1983 | Kaathirunna Divasam | Narayanan | |
| 1983 | Thimingalam | | |
| 1983 | Aadhipathyam | Kuttappan | |
| 1983 | Kayam | | |
| 1983 | Rachana | Thomas | |
| 1983 | Prathigna | Anthappan | |
| 1983 | Oru Mukham Pala Mukham | | |
| 1983 | Aana | Moidu | |
| 1983 | Himavahini | Hamsa | |
| 1983 | Changatham | Sulfikar | |
| 1983 | Attakkalasam | Josekutty | |
| 1983 | Asthram | Philip | |
| 1983 | Aa Rathri | Sundaresan | |
| 1983 | Manassoru Mahaasamudram | Raghavan | |
| 1984 | Bullet | | |
| 1984 | Thirakal | Varkey | |
| 1984 | Panchavadi Palam | Abel | |
| 1984 | Kodathi | Vasu | |
| 1984 | Shree Krishnaparanthu | Gopalan | |
| 1984 | Oru Sumangaliyude Katha | Sunil Kumar | |
| 1984 | Vanitha Police | Sivan Pillai | |
| 1984 | Oru Nimisham Tharoo | | |
| 1984 | Chakkarayumma | Rahman | |
| 1984 | Shabadham | Phalgunan | |
| 1984 | Uyarangalil | Pillai | |
| 1984 | Swanthamevide Bandhamevide | Gopan | |
| 1984 | Poochakkoru Mookkuthi | Chellappan | |
| 1984 | Parannu Parannu Parannu | | |
| 1984 | Manasariyathe | Ambilykuttan | |
| 1984 | My Dear Kuttichathan | | |
| 1984 | Kaliyil Alpam Karyam | Vasunni | |
| 1984 | Ivide Ingane | Kuttappan | |
| 1984 | Itha Innu Muthal | 'Kundar' Kuttappan | |
| 1985 | Nerariyum Nerathu | Kuttappan Bhagavathar | |
| 1985 | Onningu Vannengil | Esthappan | |
| 1985 | Black Mail | | |
| 1985 | Mulamoottil Adima | Lawrence Michael | |
| 1985 | Oru Sandesham Koodi | Raju | |
| 1985 | Sammelanam | Thankappan | |
| 1985 | Mukhyamanthri | Kozhivila | |
| 1985 | Puzhayozhugum Vazhi | Sukumaran | |
| 1985 | Revenge | Babu | |
| 1985 | Chorakku Chora | Kunjappan | |
| 1985 | Vellarikka Pattanam | Porinju | |
| 1985 | Vasantha Sena | Albert | |
| 1985 | Mutharamkunnu P.O. | M. K. Nakulan | |
| 1985 | Koodum Thedi | Laser | |
| 1985 | Vannu Kandu Keezhadakki | Warriyer | |
| 1985 | Pathamudayam | | |
| 1985 | Ithu Nalla Thamasa | Basheer Pillai | |
| 1985 | Boeing Boeing | O. P. Olassa | |
| 1985 | Azhiyatha Bandhangal | Sugunachandran | |
| 1985 | Aram + Aram = Kinnaram | Manoharan | |
| 1985 | Muhurtham Pathnonnu Muppathinu | Laser | |
| 1985 | Ee Sabdam Innathe Sabdam | Nanukuttan Pillai | |
| 1986 | Vivahitare Itihile | Jerry | |
| 1986 | Karinagam | | |
| 1986 | Thalavattam | Narayan | |
| 1986 | Annoru Ravil | Vicky | |
| 1986 | Ninnistham Ennishtam | Kurup | |
| 1986 | Kochu Themmadi | Balan Mesthiri | |
| 1986 | Niramulla Raavukal | Ravunni | |
| 1986 | Sughamodevi | Vinod | |
| 1986 | Revathikkoru Pavakkutty | Kalyan Kumar | |
| 1986 | Iniyum Kurukshethram | Neeretupuram Narayanankutty | |
| 1986 | Hello My Dear: Wrong Number | Cop | |
| 1986 | Ente Sonia | Veeran | |
| 1986 | Ennennum Kannettante | Padmanabhan Pillai | |
| 1986 | Kulambadikal | | |
| 1986 | Ambadi Thannilorunni | Suni Mon | |
| 1986 | Arappatta Kettiya Gramathil | Bhasi | |
| 1986 | Katturumbinum Kathukuthu | Settu | |
| 1986 | Ente Shabdam | Kalavattom Vasu | |
| 1986 | Adiverukal | Koshi | |
| 1986 | Manasiloru Manimuthu | | |
| 1986 | Dheem Tharikida Thom | Shankaran Pillai | |
| 1986 | Mazha Peyyunnu Maddalam Kottunnu | Sardar Krishna Kurup | |
| 1986 | Kshamichu Ennoru Vakku | Watch Paramu | |
| 1987 | Yagagni | Kurup | |
| 1987 | Ayitham | N S Thovala | |
| 1987 | Kadhakku Pinnil | Vishambharan | |
| 1987 | Neeyallengil Njan | Ramankutty | |
| 1987 | Penn Simham | | |
| 1987 | Vazhiyorakkazhchakal | Music teacher | |
| 1987 | Thoovana Thumbigal | Ravunni Nair | |
| 1987 | Sarvakalasala | Fr. Kuttanadan | |
| 1987 | Naradhan Keralathil | Mathan | |
| 1987 | Ivide Ellavarkum Sukham | Shivasankara Varma | |
| 1987 | January Oru Orma | Joseph | |
| 1987 | Jaalakam | Principal | |
| 1987 | Irupatham Noottandu | Chanakyan | |
| 1987 | Boomiyile Rajakkanmar | Aromalunni | |
| 1987 | Nombarathi Poovu | Sebastian | |
| 1987 | Adimakal Udamakal | Mukundan | |
| 1988 | Witness | Jayakumar | |
| 1988 | Simon Peter Ninakku Vendi | Lazer | |
| 1988 | Ponmuttayidunna Tharavu | Velichappadu | |
| 1988 | Mukunthetta Sumitra Vilikkunnu | Gopi | |
| 1988 | Moonnam Pakkam | Kavala | |
| 1988 | Loose Loose Arappiri Loose | Jagathi | |
| 1988 | Dhwani | Manikanta Pillai | |
| 1988 | Mrithyunjayam | Antony | |
| 1988 | Oru Muthassi Kadha | Chellayyan | |
| 1988 | Vicharana | Kuttappan | |
| 1988 | Oru CBI Diary Kurippu | Vikram | |
| 1988 | Alila Kuruvikal | | |
| 1988 | Inquilabinte Puthri | Kuttappan | |
| 1988 | Daisy | Tamil Postman | |
| 1988 | Rahasyam Parama Rahasyam | Nanappan | |
| 1988 | August 1 | Gopi | |
| 1989 | Avanikunnile Kinnari Pookkal | Stephen Thomas | |
| 1989 | Varnam | Venkidy | |
| 1989 | Ulsavapittennu | Madhavan Kutty | |
| 1989 | Season | Sathyan | |
| 1989 | Pradeshika Varthakal | Thankachen | |
| 1989 | Peruvannapurathe Visheshangal | Keeleri Padmanabhan | |
| 1989 | Oru Sayahnathinte Swapnam | Stephan | |
| 1989 | Kalpana House | Louis | |
| 1989 | News | Karam | |
| 1989 | Aksharathettu | Gowthaman | |
| 1989 | Naaduvazhikal | Bawa | |
| 1989 | Muthu Kudayum Choodi | | |
| 1989 | Kaalal Pada | Sundaresan Naicker | |
| 1989 | Mrugaya | Adv. Ramankutty | |
| 1989 | Charithram | Shivan Kutty | |
| 1989 | Ashokante Aswathikuttikku | | |
| 1989 | Crime Branch | Alex | |
| 1989 | Kireedam | Ramanan | |
| 1989 | Jaathakam | Narayana Panikkar | |
| 1989 | Innale | Azhagappan | |
| 1989 | Devadas | Rajan | |
| 1989 | Annakutty Kodambakkam Vilikkunnu | Manavendran/Kuttachan | |
| 1989 | Chakkikotha Chankaran | Ouseppu | |
| 1989 | Adikkurippu | Basheer | |
| 1989 | Jagratha | Vikram | |

=== 1990s ===
| Year | Title | Role | Notes |
|---|---|---|---|
| 1990 | Kadathanadan Ambadi | Karkodakan | |
| 1990 | Randam Varavu | Gopi | |
| 1990 | Rajavazhcha | Mathai | |
| 1990 | Orukkam | Anthrappayi | |
| 1990 | Nagarangalil Chennu Raparkam | Abu Hassan | |
| 1990 | Minda Poochakku Kalyanam | Sahadevan | |
| 1990 | Ee Thanutha Veluppan Kalathu | Fr. Paviyanos Vanolikkara | |
| 1990 | No. 20 Madras Mail | Chokkalingam | |
| 1990 | Marupuram | Chakkunni | |
| 1990 | Dr. Pasupathy | Nanappan | |
| 1990 | Arhatha | Unni Unnithan | |
| 1990 | Apoorva Sangamam | | |
| 1990 | Aanaval Mothiram | Chellappan | |
| 1990 | Cheriya Lokavum Valiya Manushyarum | Sugunan | |
| 1990 | Superstar | Vishalakshan | |
| 1990 | Kottayam Kunjachan | Konayil Kochappi | |
| 1990 | Anantha Vruthantham | Jathak Krishnan | |
| 1990 | Oliyampukal | P. P. Vakkachan | |
| 1991 | Ulladakkam | Mental patient | |
| 1991 | Souhrudam | Mathachan | |
| 1991 | Pookkalam Varavayi | Cherukunnathu Bhaskara Pillai | |
| 1991 | Agni Nilavu | Kumar | |
| 1991 | Chakravarthy | Babu | |
| 1991 | May Dinam | Damodharan | |
| 1991 | Thudar Katha | Nadanam Nanu | |
| 1991 | Nettippattam | Ummini | |
| 1991 | Mukha Chithram | Govinda Menon | |
| 1991 | Mookkilyarajyathu | Krishnankutty | |
| 1991 | Kizhakkunarum Pakshi | Vaidi | |
| 1991 | Kuttapathram | Vishwan | |
| 1991 | Koodikazhca | Mathew Pulikkadan | |
| 1991 | Kilukkampetti | Mukundan | |
| 1991 | Kilukkam | Nischal | |
| 1991 | Kadinjool Kalyanam | Sivaraman | |
| 1991 | Georgekutty C/O Georgekutty | Chandy | |
| 1991 | Ganamela | Ganapathi | |
| 1991 | Chanchattam | Roopesh Kumar | |
| 1991 | Apoorvam Chilar | Sankara Warrier | |
| 1992 | Yodha | Appukuttan | |
| 1992 | Soorya Manasam | Mooppan | |
| 1992 | Aparatha | Minnal Chacko | |
| 1992 | Aardram | Vettichara Dimon | |
| 1992 | Utsavamelam | Thankappan | |
| 1992 | Rathachakram | Bhanuvikrama Shetty | |
| 1992 | Ootty Pattanam | Basheer | |
| 1992 | Nakshthrakoodaram | Bhaskara Kurup | |
| 1992 | Naadody | Nair | |
| 1992 | Kunjikuruvi | | |
| 1992 | Maanyanmar | Kottayam Kochunni | |
| 1992 | Kunukkitta Kozhi | Gurukkal Ammavan | |
| 1992 | Kaazhchakkppuram | Koprapurakkal Chacko | |
| 1992 | Ezhara Ponnana | Achu | |
| 1992 | Ente Ponnu Thampuran | Prafulla Kumar | |
| 1992 | Ellarum Chollanu | Pillai | |
| 1992 | Champakulam Thachan | Rajappan | |
| 1992 | Ayalathe Addeham | Chandykunju | |
| 1993 | Thalamura | | |
| 1993 | Porutham | Unnithan | |
| 1993 | Gandharvam | Mesthri | |
| 1993 | Sthalathe Pradhana Payyans | Salim | |
| 1993 | Mithunam | Suguthan | |
| 1993 | Kavadiyattam | Velappan | |
| 1993 | Ithu Manjukaalam | Doctor | |
| 1993 | Aacharyan | Prabhakaran | |
| 1993 | Kalippattam | Thakaraparambil Unnikrishnan | |
| 1993 | Kabooliwala | Kadalas | |
| 1993 | Journalist | R. J. Kizhakkedam | |
| 1993 | Janam | Vazhuthala Sasi | |
| 1993 | Ekalavyan | Achuthan Nair | |
| 1993 | Customs Diary | Aravindakshan | |
| 1993 | Bhagyavan | Mathachan | |
| 1993 | Bandhukkal Sathrukkal | Sakshi | |
| 1993 | Ammayane Sathyam | Pisharadi | |
| 1993 | Akashadoothu | Gevarghese Mathew | |
| 1993 | Aayirappara | | |
| 1993 | Bhoomi Geetham | Adv. Ganesh Iyyer | |
| 1993 | O' Faby | Rappai | |
| 1994 | Minnaram | Unnunni | |
| 1994 | Vadhu Doctoranu | Kunjan Marar | |
| 1994 | Sudha Mathalam | | |
| 1994 | Pingami | Kutti Hassan | |
| 1994 | Pidakkozhi Koovunna Noottandu | Ikru – Sathyasheelan | |
| 1994 | Rajadhani | Nadarajan | |
| 1994 | Chukkan | Sreeraman | |
| 1994 | Gandeevam | Pothuval | |
| 1994 | Pakshe | Vikraman's assistant | |
| 1994 | Manathe Kottaram | Abraham John | |
| 1994 | Malappuram Haji Mahanaya Joji | Drill Master Aliyar | |
| 1994 | Kinnaripuzhayoram | Chacko | |
| 1994 | Vardhakya Puranam | Ommanakuttan | |
| 1994 | Santhanagopalam | | |
| 1994 | CID Unnikrishnan B.A., B.Ed. | Ommen Koshy | |
| 1994 | Chukkan | Sreeraman | |
| 1994 | Cabinet | Colonel Varma | |
| 1994 | Vishnu | Jameskutty | |
| 1995 | Vrudhanmare Sookshikkuka | Rudran Pillai | |
| 1995 | Tom & Jerry | Mukundan | |
| 1995 | Boxer | Pachalam Sundaran | |
| 1995 | Sargavasantham | Kunjunni | |
| 1995 | Thovalapookkal | | |
| 1995 | Puthukottyile Puthu Manavalan | Madassery Kochu Thampi | |
| 1995 | Punnaram | Raghavan | |
| 1995 | Peterscott | peter | |
| 1995 | Pai Brothers | Ananda Pai | |
| 1995 | Manikya Chempazhukka | L. Lalichan Peruvazhiyil | |
| 1995 | Mangalam Veettil Manaseswari Gupta | Shivankutty | |
| 1995 | Kusruthikaatu | Madhavan Kutty | |
| 1995 | Kaattile Thadi Thevarude Ana | Venugopal/Manikantan | |
| 1995 | Aksharam | Tharakan | |
| 1995 | Aadyathe Kanmani | Sreedharan Unnithan | |
| 1995 | Oru Abhibhashakante Case Diary | Mani Kunju | |
| 1995 | Avittam Thirunaal Aarogya Sriman | | |
| 1996 | Mayooranritham | Sarangathan Pilla | |
| 1996 | April 19 | Chacko | |
| 1996 | Kudumbakodathi | Paramanandan Nair | |
| 1996 | Madamma | Janmi | |
| 1996 | Lalanam | Karuparambil Sunny | |
| 1996 | Kireedamillatha Rajakkanmar | Pushpull Rakhavan | |
| 1996 | Kalyana Sowgandhikam | Mambally Vasudevan | |
| 1996 | Kaathil Oru Kinnaram | Karunakaran | |
| 1996 | Vanarasena | Pankajakshan | |
| 1997 | Arjunan Pillayum Anchu Makkalum | Sudhakaran | |
| 1997 | Ullasapoongattu | Vasuvannan | |
| 1997 | Suvarna Simhaasanam | Das G. Nair | |
| 1997 | Newspaper Boy | K.K. Ponnappan | |
| 1997 | Nee Varuvolam | Manoharan Pilla | |
| 1997 | Manasam | Kichamani | |
| 1997 | Kilukil Pambaram | Urumis | |
| 1997 | Kalyanappittannu | | |
| 1997 | Kalyana Kacheri | Ambadi Balaraman Nair | |
| 1997 | Siamese Irattagal | | |
| 1997 | Junior Mandrake | Driver Omanakuttan | |
| 1997 | Hitler Brothers | Adv. Manmathan | |
| 1997 | The Good Boys | Vikraman Nair | |
| 1997 | Ekkareyanente Manasam | Radhakrishnan | |
| 1997 | Adukkala Rahasyam Angaadi Paattu | Kaimal | |
| 1998 | Meenathil Thalikettu | Kaimal Mash | |
| 1998 | Meenakshi Kalyanam | Earali Vasu | |
| 1998 | Kottaram Veettile Apputtan | Madhavan | |
| 1998 | Mayajalam | Ramesh Nambyar | |
| 1998 | Mangalya Pallakku | Sankara Warrier | |
| 1998 | Mayilpeelikkavu | Pappan | |
| 1998 | Magician Mahendralal from Delhi | Scaria, Magician Mahendralal | |
| 1998 | Gramapanchayath | R. A. Jappan | |
| 1998 | Elavamkodu Desam | Kurungodan | |
| 1998 | Vismayam | SI Muhammed | |
| 1998 | Anuragakottaram | Sobharaj | |
| 1998 | Manthri Maalikayil Manasammatham | Samaran | |
| 1998 | Alibabayum Arara Kallanmarum | Thanku | |
| 1999 | Vazhunnor | 'Meen' Mathachan | |
| 1999 | Udayapuram Sulthan | Parasu Nampoothiri | |
| 1999 | Captain | Ananthan Nambiar | |
| 1999 | Jananayakan | Ayyappan | |
| 1999 | Tokyo Nagarathile Viseshangal | Col. R. K. Nair | |
| 1999 | Swastham Grihabharanam | Pachu | |
| 1999 | Prem Poojari | Pattabhi | |
| 1999 | Pranaya Nilavu | Kunjahammad | |
| 1999 | Pattabhishekam | Aadhi Thamburan | |
| 1999 | Panchapandavar | Kunjunni | |
| 1999 | Parassala Pachan Payyannur Paramu | | |
| 1999 | Olympian Anthony Adam | Vattoli Porinchu | |
| 1999 | Njangal Santhushtaranu | Salperu Sadanandan | |
| 1999 | Independence | Manmadhan Potti SI | |
| 1999 | Friends | Chackachamparambil Lasar | |
| 1999 | Deepasthambham Mahascharyam | Nalpamaram Nambeeshan | |
| 1999 | Charlie Chaplin | Chaplin | |
| 1999 | Chandamama | Eappachan | |
| 1999 | Bharya Veettil Paramasukham | Sadhashivan | |
| 1999 | American Ammayi | C. M. Sugunan | |
| 1999 | Aakasha Ganga | Muthippura Varkey | |

=== 2000s ===
| Year | Title | Role | Notes |
|---|---|---|---|
| 2000 | Varnakkazhchakal | Kaimal | |
| 2000 | Neela Thatakathile Nizhal Pakshikal | | |
| 2000 | Priyam | Unni | |
| 2000 | Pilots | Chacko | |
| 2000 | Narashimham | Poovalli Chandrabhanu | |
| 2000 | Mera Naam Joker | Parijakshan Pilla | |
| 2000 | Nadan Pennum Natupramaniyum | Unni Pillai | |
| 2000 | Mr. Butler | Achayan | |
| 2000 | Vinayapoorvam Vidhyaadharan | Vidhyadharan Nair | |
| 2000 | Anamuttathe Angalamar | Ramakrishnan | |
| 2000 | Ingane Oru Nilapakshi | Srinivas | |
| 2000 | Mazha | Shastrikal | |
| 2000 | Manassil Oru Manjuthulli | Parasahayam Adiyodi/Ramu | |
| 2000 | Dreams | Dr. Sugunan | |
| 2000 | Devadoothan | Priest | |
| 2000 | Darling Darling | Appachan | |
| 2000 | Daivathinte Makan | Thalassery Kunjambu | |
| 2000 | High Range | | |
| 2001 | Vakkalathu Narayanankutty | Adv. Easwara Subramoni Iyer | |
| 2001 | Saivar Thirumeni | Kunjoottan | |
| 2001 | Akashathile Paravakal | Dasan | |
| 2001 | Onnaman | Vasu | |
| 2001 | Dosth | Ettuveettil Kuttappan | |
| 2001 | Kakkakuyil | Adv. Nambishan | |
| 2001 | Suryachakram | | |
| 2001 | Raavanaprabhu | Sakthivel Gounder | |
| 2001 | Bharthavudyogam | Mathachan | |
| 2001 | Nariman | Kochu Narayanan | |
| 2001 | Achaneyanenikkishtam | Nalinakshan | |
| 2002 | Thilakkam | Fr. Stephen | |
| 2002 | Thandavam | Mathachan | |
| 2002 | Savithriyute Aranjanam | Achu Maash | |
| 2002 | Malayalimamanu Vanakkam | Kesunni | |
| 2002 | Kuberan | S. I. Thimmayya | |
| 2002 | Kasillatheyum Jeevikkam | | |
| 2002 | Kanmashi | Bhaskara Menon | |
| 2002 | Kakke Kakke Koodevide | Pappachan | |
| 2002 | Jagathy Jagadeesh in Town | Jagadeendran/Balakrishnan | |
| 2002 | Ente Hridhayathinte Utama | | |
| 2002 | Chirikkudukka | Broker Nanukuttan | |
| 2002 | Chathurangam | Kochausepp | |
| 2002 | Bamboo Boys | Varkey | |
| 2002 | Meesa Madhavan | Bhageerathan Pillai | |
| 2002 | Nizhalkuthu | Maharajah's officer | |
| 2002 | Nakshathrakkannulla Rajakumaran Avanundoru Rajakumari | Chanthutty | |
| 2002 | Nandanam | Kumbidi | |
| 2003 | Mazhanoolkkanavu | Nair | |
| 2003 | Vasanthamalika | Bodheswaran | |
| 2003 | Thillana Thillana | Ujjwal | |
| 2003 | Mr. Brahmachari | V. V. T. | |
| 2003 | Shikari Bolona | P P Gold Gopalan | |
| 2003 | Thilakkam | Priest | |
| 2003 | Kilichundan Mampazham | Irunthalakadan Nampoothiri | |
| 2003 | Kalavarkey | Kalavarkey | |
| 2003 | Sadanandante Samayam | Krishnanunni | |
| 2003 | Vellithira | Erumathadam Jose | |
| 2003 | Swapnam Kondu Thulabharam | Sivankutty | |
| 2003 | C.I.D. Moosa | S. I. Peethambaran | |
| 2003 | Sathya Sai Baba | Sathya Sai Baba | |
| 2003 | Balettan | K. K. Pisharadi | |
| 2003 | Pattalam | Kumaran | |
| 2003 | Melvilasam Sariyanu | Cheppankudi Gajaraja Bhagavathar | |
| 2003 | Mizhi Randilum | Thechikkattu Achuthankutti | |
| 2003 | Hariharan Pillai Happy Aanu | Vasu | |
| 2003 | Ammakilikkoodu | Arnose | |
| 2003 | Valathottu Thirinjal Nalamathe Veedu | Setup Ramakrishnan | |
| 2003 | Pulival Kalyanam | Paramanandan | |
| 2003 | Pattanathil Sundaran | Kattuvalli Krishnan | |
| 2004 | Thalamelam | Dr. Gouri Shankar | |
| 2004 | Kottaram Vaidyan | Appannan | |
| 2004 | Agninakshathram | Jayanthan | |
| 2004 | Vamanapuram Bus Route | Gopalan Nair | |
| 2004 | Sethurama Iyer CBI | Vikram | |
| 2004 | Symphony | Dominic | |
| 2004 | C. I. Mahadevan 5 Adi 4 Inchu | Salgunan | |
| 2004 | Njan Salperu Ramankutty | Madhavan | |
| 2004 | Vellinakshatram | Pooradam Thirunal Valiya Koyi Thampuran | |
| 2004 | Kanninum Kannadikkum | Pushkaran | |
| 2004 | Thekkekkara Superfast | Ahammad Kutty | |
| 2004 | Jalolsavam | Ponnappan | |
| 2004 | Chathikkatha Chanthu | Manthravadi | |
| 2004 | Runway | Kariyachan | |
| 2004 | Mayilattam | Dasan | |
| 2004 | Wanted | Supru Murthy | |
| 2004 | Aparichithan | Anamala Jolly | |
| 2004 | Ee Snehatheerathu | Parasheri | |
| 2004 | Govindankutty Thirakkilaanu | Marthandan Vakkeel | |
| 2004 | Vettam | Paasha | |
| 2004 | Thudakkam | Ittoop | |
| 2004 | Rasikan | Thomachan | |
| 2004 | Vesham | Ganapathi Swamy | |
| 2004 | Amrutham | Chandy | |
| 2005 | Udayananu Tharam | Pachalam Bhasi | |
| 2005 | Athbhutha Dweepu | Madhavan, Maharaja | |
| 2005 | Kochi Rajavu | Sreemoolam Thirunal Easwaravarma Valiyakoyil Thampuran | |
| 2005 | Alice in Wonderland | Fr. Ambatt | |
| 2005 | Krithyam | Solomon Joseph | |
| 2005 | Udayon | Shavappetty Thoma | |
| 2005 | Naran | Member Kuruppu | |
| 2005 | Nerariyan CBI | Vikram | |
| 2005 | Isra | Thevar | |
| 2005 | Maanikyan | Sankaran | |
| 2005 | Mayookham | Raghu | |
| 2005 | Thanmathra | Joseph | |
| 2006 | Kilukkam Kilukilukkam | Nischal | |
| 2006 | Rasathanthram | Vettivel Sundara Pandyan | |
| 2006 | Thuruppu Gulan | Swami | |
| 2006 | Chess | Narayanan | |
| 2006 | Kalabham | | |
| 2006 | Nottam | Unni | |
| 2006 | Arunam | | |
| 2006 | Raavanan | SI Sundaran | |
| 2006 | Highway Police | S.I. Swami | |
| 2006 | Mauryan | | |
| 2006 | Pakal | | |
| 2006 | Aanachandam | Inspector Minnal Babu Shahith | |
| 2006 | Classmates | Estappanachan | |
| 2006 | Mahasamudram | Fr. Michael | |
| 2006 | Vasthavam | Unnithan Aasan | |
| 2006 | Karutha Pakshikal | Wariarettan | |
| 2006 | Yes Your Honour | Sakshi Mani | |
| 2006 | Baba Kalyani | Ramanan | |
| 2006 | Palunku | Soman Pillai | |
| 2006 | Aadum Koothu | Dr. John Santhosham Vedhamuthu | Tamil film |
| 2007 | Anchil Oraal Arjunan | Paul | |
| 2007 | Changathipoocha | Raman Nair | |
| 2007 | Detective | Detective Chandrachoodan | |
| 2007 | Sketch | Adv. Partha Saradhi Iyer | |
| 2007 | The Speed Track | K. T. Kunjavara | |
| 2007 | Chota Mumbai | 'Padakkam' Basheer | |
| 2007 | Paranju Theeratha Visheshangal | Samuel | |
| 2007 | Rakshakan | SI Karvanan | |
| 2007 | Kaakki | Karunakara Menon | |
| 2007 | Bharathan Effect | Kariyachan | |
| 2007 | Hallo | Chandykunju | |
| 2007 | Arabikatha | K. K. Kunjunni | |
| 2007 | Anchil Oral Arjunan | Paul | |
| 2007 | Sketch | Parthasaradhi | |
| 2007 | Ayur Rekha | Thankappan Pilla | |
| 2007 | Heart Beats | Principal Dr. Jacob Isaac | |
| 2007 | Paradesi | Abdul Rahman | |
| 2007 | Nasrani | Oommachan | |
| 2007 | Rock & Roll | Khader | |
| 2007 | Janmam | | |
| 2007 | Katha Parayumpol | Government Officer | |
| 2007 | Kangaroo | Mathew Abraham | |
| 2007 | Flash | "Idea" Sasi | |
| 2008 | Cycle | Kausthubhan | |
| 2008 | Kovalam | Peter | |
| 2008 | Aayudham | Contractor Hussein Haji | |
| 2008 | Kabadi Kabadi | | |
| 2008 | Swarnam | Kunjambu | |
| 2008 | Omkaram | | |
| 2008 | Jubilee | Esho | |
| 2008 | Positive | Uthaman | |
| 2008 | SMS | Swami | |
| 2008 | Aandavan | K. Parasmeswara Panicker | |
| 2008 | Pakal Nakshatrangal | | |
| 2008 | Apoorva | | |
| 2008 | Sultan | Keshava Pilla | |
| 2008 | Magic Lamp | Lalan | |
| 2008 | Bullet | | |
| 2008 | Crazy Gopalan | Lavang Vasu | |
| 2008 | Lollipop | Novelist Karunan | Cameo |
| 2008 | Samayam | | |
| 2008 | One Way Ticket | Bava Haji | |
| 2008 | Madampi | Advocate | |
| 2008 | Parunthu | Hemanth Bhai | |
| 2008 | Twenty:20 | Sankarettan | |
| 2009 | Makante Achan | Himaval Chithanya Swami | |
| 2009 | Pazhassi Raja | Kandan Menon | |
| 2009 | Sagar Alias Jacky Reloaded | Ashok Kumar | |
| 2009 | Passenger | Minister | |
| 2009 | Swantham Lekhakan | Govindan | |
| 2009 | Patham Adhyayam | Adithya Varma | |
| 2009 | Chemistry | Sambashivan | |
| 2009 | Bharya Swatham Suruthu | | |
| 2009 | Raamanam | Pookkoya Thangal | |
| 2009 | My Big Father | Valanjambalam Vasu | |
| 2009 | Kerala Cafe | JK | Segment: Happy Journey |
| 2009 | Kadha, Samvidhanam Kunchakko | | |
| 2009 | Kappal Muthalaali | Dubai Chandi | |
| 2009 | Shudharil Shudhan | | |
| 2009 | Paribhavam | | |
| 2009 | Vellathooval | Fr. Puthusheri | |
| 2009 | Oru Black and White Kudumbam | | |
| 2009 | Banaras | Kanaran | |
| 2009 | I. G. – Inspector General | SI Damodaran Pillai | |
| 2009 | Dr. Patient | Poduval | |
| 2009 | Sanmanasullavan Appukuttan | Appukuttan | |
| 2009 | Thirunakkara Perumal | Keshavan | |
| 2009 | Kancheepurathe Kalyanam | Sreeramalingam Mudaliar | |
| 2009 | Calendar | K. K. Manjooran | |
| 2009 | Angel John | Khader Moosa | |
| 2009 | Evidam Swargamanu | Bhuvanendran | |

=== 2010s ===
| Year | Title | Role | Notes |
|---|---|---|---|
| 2010 | Cheriya Kallanum Valiya Policeum | Vattukuzhi Velayudhan | |
| 2010 | Thanthonni | Dr. Thomas Vaidyan | |
| 2010 | Kadaksham | | |
| 2010 | Ammanilavu | | |
| 2010 | Karayilekku Oru Kadal Dooram | | |
| 2010 | Senior Mandrake | Omanakuttan | |
| 2010 | Sahasram | Production controller Raghupathy | |
| 2010 | Khilafath | | |
| 2010 | Inganeyum Oral | | |
| 2010 | Fiddle | | |
| 2010 | Valiyangadi | | |
| 2010 | Brahmasthram | Ponnappan | |
| 2010 | Annarakkannanum Thannalayathu | S. Gunasekharan | |
| 2010 | Chaverpada | | |
| 2010 | 9 KK Road | | |
| 2010 | Kanyakumari Express | Keshavan Nambiar | |
| 2010 | Thaskara Lahala | | |
| 2010 | Sufi Paranja Katha | Avaru Musaliar | |
| 2010 | Canvas | | |
| 2010 | Raama Raavanan | | |
| 2010 | Pathinonnil Vyazham | Nakulan | |
| 2010 | Nayakan | Nambeeshan | |
| 2010 | T. D. Dasan Std. VI B | Menon | |
| 2010 | 24 Hours | Inspector | |
| 2010 | Malarvaadi Arts Club | Raghavan | |
| 2010 | Elsamma Enna Aankutty | Member Ramanan | |
| 2010 | April Fool | Sathyakaman | |
| 2010 | Apoorvaragam | Adv. Bernard | |
| 2010 | Aathmakatha | Fr. Punnoos | |
| 2010 | Shikkar | Mathayichan | |
| 2010 | Marykkundoru Kunjaadu | Kundukuzhy Achan | |
| 2010 | Sadgamaya | Unni Nedungadi | |
| 2010 | Avan | CI Samkutty | |
| 2010 | Pranchiyettan & the Saint | Pandit Deenadayal | |
| 2010 | Chekavar | Nari Bahuleyan | |
| 2010 | Best of Luck | Advocate Uthaman | |
| 2011 | Ninnishtam Ennishtam 2 | | |
| 2011 | Sankaranum Mohananum | | |
| 2011 | Three Kings | Dinakaran | |
| 2011 | Venicile Vyapari | "Kaladi" Govindan | |
| 2011 | Bombay Mittayi | | |
| 2011 | Kanakompathu | E.C. Narayanankutty | |
| 2011 | Innanu Aa Kalyanam | Sundaresan | |
| 2011 | Athe Mazha Athe Veyil | | |
| 2011 | Naayika | | |
| 2011 | Makeup Man | Vareeth Mappila | |
| 2011 | Ithu Nammude Katha | Sarkar Pillai | |
| 2011 | Arjunan Saakshi | Dr. Ibrahim Mooppan | |
| 2011 | Urumi | Chenichery Kurup/Kerala Minister | |
| 2011 | Kudumbasree Travels | Kunjambu | |
| 2011 | Mohabbath | Beerankutty | |
| 2011 | Payyans | Seema's father | Photo presence |
| 2011 | Lucky Jokers | Krishanvarma Thampuran | |
| 2011 | Killadi Raman | Kuriakose | |
| 2011 | Manikyakkallu | Karunakaran Karikalkuzhi | |
| 2011 | Nadakame Ulakam | Labham Lambodaran | |
| 2011 | Christian Brothers | Kochu Thoma | |
| 2011 | Janapriyan | Achayan | |
| 2011 | China Town | Jaggu Bhai | |
| 2011 | Seniors | Adiyodi | |
| 2011 | The Filmstaar | | |
| 2011 | The Train | Joseph | |
| 2011 | Maharaja Talkies | | |
| 2011 | Uppukandam Brothers: Back in Action | Kunjeesho | |
| 2011 | Bombay March 12 | | |
| 2011 | Swapna Sanchari | Astrologer Devaram | |
| 2011 | Note Out | S. I. Eerally | |
| 2011 | The Metro | Achayan | |
| 2011 | Oru Nunakkadha | Inspector Thampi | |
| 2011 | Teja Bhai & Family | Vasudevan Nair | |
| 2011 | Indian Rupee | Golden Pappan | |
| 2011 | Pachuvum Kovalanum | Producer Esthappan | |
| 2011 | Race | Eldo | |
| 2011 | Priyappetta Nattukare | Gandhi Kittan | |
| 2011 | Sarkar Colony | Puthan Purayil Padmanabha Pillai | |
| 2011 | Kalabha Mazha | Vilwadiri Iyyer | |
| 2011 | Veeraputhran | | |
| 2011 | Happy Durbar | S.I. Chacko | |
| 2011 | Manushyamrugam | Fr. Isaac Chacko | |
| 2011 | Makaramanju | Govardhandas Makhanji | |
| 2011 | Track | | |
| 2011 | Kunjettan | | |
| 2012 | Asuravithu | | |
| 2012 | Padmashree Bharath Dr.Saroj Kumar | Pachalam Bhasi | |
| 2012 | Oru Kudumba Chithram | Gajendra Kurup | |
| 2012 | Kanneerinu Madhuram | | |
| 2012 | Grihanathan | Reghuettan | |
| 2012 | Casanovva | Luka | |
| 2012 | Njanum Ente Familiyum | Dr. Easwarmoorthy | |
| 2012 | Father's Day | | |
| 2012 | Cobra | Isaac's grandfather | |
| 2012 | Vaidooryam | Bhargavan Pilla | |
| 2012 | Masters | Kunnanthanam Devassy | |
| 2012 | The King & the Commissioner | | |
| 2012 | Grandmaster | Circle Inspector Rashid | |
| 2012 | Manjadikuru | Unni | |
| 2012 | Thiruvambadi Thamban | Thiruvambadi Mathan Tharakan | |
| 2012 | Ivan Megharoopan | Appu Marar | |
| 2012 | Pulival Pattanam | | |
| 2012 | Ezham Suryan | | |
| 2012 | Nadabrahmam | | |
| 2012 | Red Alert | | |
| 2012 | No. 66 Madhura Bus | Bus Conductor Mathaikutty | |
| 2012 | Parudeesa | Authachan | |
| 2012 | Aakasmikam | | |
| 2012 | Ardhanareeswaran | | Unreleased movie |
| 2013 | Yathra Thudarunnu | | |
| 2013 | Players | | |
| 2013 | Cowboy | Ambili | |
| 2014 | Malayalakkar Residency | | |
| 2015 | Daivathinte Kayyoppu | | |
| 2015 | Mathruvandanam | | |
| 2015 | The Reporter | Ravi Pillai | |
| 2015 | 3 Wicketinu 365 runs | CI Mansingh/Marthandan/Bhairavan/Fr. Thankachan/Padmadalakshan | |
| 2016 | Ente Cinema – The Movie Festival | | |
| 2018 | 100 Years of Chrysostom | | |

=== 2020s ===
| Year | Title | Role | Ref. |
|---|---|---|---|
| 2020 | CBI 5: The Brain | Vikram, CBI officer | |
| TBA | Vala † | Professor Ambili / Uncle LUNA.R | |

=== As a playback singer ===
- Chakkarayumma (1984) .... "Naalukaashum kayyil vechu"
- Ulsavamelam (1992) .... "Raamaa Sreeraama" (solo)
- Bandhukkal Shathrukkal (1993) .... "Veshangal" (solo)
- Kottaaram Veettile Apputtan (1998) .... "Ambottee"
- Hai (2005) .... "Vallee Vallee"
- Moz & Cat (2009) .... "Innu Kondu Theerum"

=== As director ===
- Kalyana Unnikal (1998)
- Annakutty Kodambakkam Vilikkunnu (1989)

=== As writer ===
- Champion Thomas (1990) (story)
- Witness (1988) (story)

=== Dialogue, screenplay ===
- Champion Thomas (1990)

== Television ==
=== As actor ===
- Crime Branch (Kairali TV)
- Hukka Huwwa Meckado (Asianet)
- Ellam Mayajalam (Asianet)
- Sree Mahabhagavatham (Asianet)
- Kodachakram (Telefilm) (Asianet)
- Swami Ayyappan (Asianet)
- Devimahatymyam (Asianet)
- Smarakasilakal (Doordarshan)

=== As producer ===
- Hukka Huwwa Meckado (Asianet)
- Ellam Mayajalam (Asianet)
