= Sasidharan Arattuvazhi =

Indian playwright and screenwriter

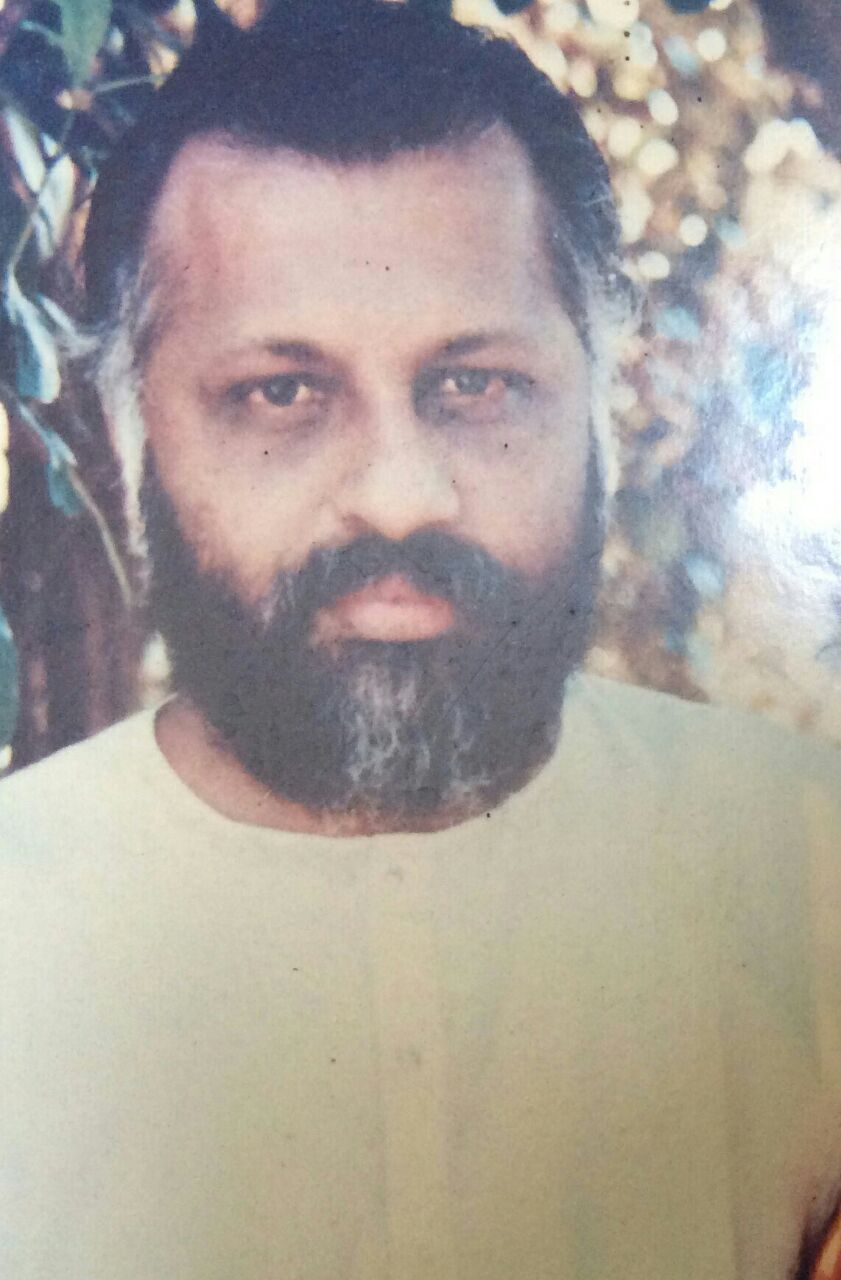
- Born: 25 August 1955; Arattuvazhi, State of Travancore-Cochin, India (present day Alappuzha, Kerala, India)
- Died: 21 January 2001 (aged 45)
- Occupations: Playwright; Screenwriter
- Spouse: Sudhakutty
- Children: 2

Sasidharan Arattuvazhi (25 August 1955 – 21 January 2001) was an Indian playwright and screenwriter. Within a career spanning more than two decades, he wrote 20 screenplays and 12 plays.

== Biography ==
His first professional stage play was Kolayaali (The Murderer). He developed a keen interest in writing screenplays for films. He made his film debut with Kaladharan's Nettipattom (1991). But the film failed in the box office, even though it was lauded as a good film by a cult audience. He was then approached by Rajasenan, for whom he wrote the family drama Ayalathe Adheham. He went on to write screenplays for 18 more films, including Yoddha, comic thriller CID Unnikrishnan B.A., B.Ed., family drama Kaliveedu, and Cheppadividya.

Sasidharan Arattuvazhi died on 21 January 2001 at the age of 45. He was suffering from kidney related diseases for four years. He was survived by his wife Sudhakutty and two daughters.

== Filmography ==
- Jananaayakan (1999)
- Aalibabayum Aarara Kallanmarum (1998)
- Ishtadanam (1997)
- Kilukil Pambaram (1997)
- Kaliveedu (1996)
- Kudumbakodathi (1996)
- Simhavalan Menon (1995)
- Avittam Thirunaal Aarogya Sriman (1995)
- Varam (1993)
- Cheppadividya
- CID Unnikrishnan B.A., B.Ed. (1994)
- Pidakkozhi Koovunna Noottandu (1994)
- Vardhakyapuranam (1994)
- Porutham
- Pravachakan (1993)
- Yoddha (1992)
- Ayalathe Adheham (1992)
- Nettippattom (1991)
