= Kinnaripuzhayoram =

1994 Malayalam movie

- Directed by: Haridas
- Screenplay by: Gireesh Puthenchery
- Story by: Priyadarshan
- Produced by: V Balakrishnan
- Starring: Sreenivasan; Siddique; Thilakan; Jagathy Sreekumar; Devayani; Mukesh
- Cinematography: Venugopal
- Edited by: K. Sankunni
- Music by: M. G. Radhakrishnan; Johnson (Background score)
- Production company: Anugruha cine arts
- Distributed by: Anugruha release
- Release date: August 18, 1994
- Country: India
- Language: Malayalam

Kinnaripuzhayoram is a 1994 Indian Malayalam-language romantic comedy film directed by Haridas and written by Girish Puthenchery (who also wrote the lyrics) based on a story by Priyadarshan. It stars Sreenivasan, Siddique, Thilakan, Devayani, Jagathy Sreekumar, Mukesh and Janardhanan in the main roles. It was Devayani's debut in Malayalam cinema.

== Plot ==
Thirusherry Madhavan Vaidyar is a well established Ayurvedic medical practitioner in a village. He has two sons, Dr. Unnikrishnan and Kunjikrishnan. Unnikrishnan is studying MBBS, while Kunjikrishnan has not studied beyond the 8th standard. Kunjikrishnan kills a patient by giving him the wrong medicine and Vaidyar gets angry as the kin of the victim wants to murder him. Kunjikrishnan is in love with his cousin Indu. She falls in love with Unnikrishnan and is promised to him in marriage. When Kunjikrishnan learns this, he leaves the village and comes back as a fraud holy man who practices Ayurvedic medicine. He and his assistant Chacko, a well-known fraudster using the pseudonym "Thirumeni" fool the villagers by their magic and medicines made adding ayurvedic materials to powdered regular pills, which they obtain by paying a bribe to the doctor, ruining the practice of his brother Siddique. Their uncle Sivashankaran Nair, the father of Indu tries to forcibly marry her to Kunjikrishnan. Unnikrishnan and her decision to play a prank on Kunjikrishnan and Chacko by making her act insane just as Kunjikrishnan tries to marry her. They believe she is really insane and try their cures. In the end, the Sub inspector Dharmarajan Kutty Pilla arrests Chacko and warns Kunjikrishnan never to tie up with fraudsters. Unnikrishnan and Indu marry.

== Cast ==
- Sreenivasan as Kunjikrishnan
- Siddique as Unnikrishnan
- Thilakan as Thirusherry Madhavan Vaidyar
  - Kunjikrishnan & Unnikrishnan's father
- Devayani as Indhu
- Jagathy Sreekumar as Chacko
- Mukesh as Swami Dharman /SI Dharmarajan Kutty Pilla (Extended cameo appearance)
- Janardhanan as Sivashankaran Nair
  - Indhu's father
- K. P. A. C. Lalitha as Lakshmikutty
  - Madhavan Vaidhyar's wife and Sivashankaran's sister
- Kanakalatha as Savithri
  - Indhu's stepmother
- Cochin Haneefa as Moothedathu Kumaran
- Bobe Kottarakkara as villager

== Reception ==
A critic from The Times of India wrote that "If you are someone who loves the Harithabha and Pachappu (greenery), and miss those badly, this movie will fill your heart!"
