= Santhanagopalam =

- Poster
- Directed by: Sathyan Anthikkad
- Written by: Raghunath Paleri
- Produced by: Mathew George
- Starring: Thilakan; Jagadheesh; Balachandra Menon; Kaviyoor Ponnamma; Krishnan Kutty Nair; Innocent; Sankaradi; Jagathy Sreekumar; Chippy
- Cinematography: Vipin Mohan
- Edited by: K. Rajagopal
- Music by: Johnson
- Production company: Central Productions
- Distributed by: Central Productions
- Release date: 1994
- Running time: 130 minutes
- Country: India
- Language: Malayalam

Santhanagopalam is a 1994 Malayalam film, starring Thilakan, Jagadheesh, Balachandra Menon, and Kaviyoor Ponnamma in the lead roles. Thilakan won the 1994 Kerala State Film Award for Best Actor for his roles in Gamanam and this film. It is a remake of Telugu film Kalikalam (1991).

== Plot ==
Krishna Kurup is a worker at a factory and his family consists of his wife, his dad and 4 children (2 sons and 2 daughters). Elder son Sudhakaran is trying hard to establish himself in Kerala after having had strong will to stay in Kerala rather than going abroad. Second son Vinayachandran is looking for a Government job. Sudhakaran finally starts a telephone booth and is inaugurated by Circle Inspector. Krishna Kurup however wants Vinayachandran to look out for better prospects in the interim of his test results. Vinayachandran also shows some plans to start a business of his own. Once he and Krishna Kurup travelling to Mangalore for a job need of Vinayachandran, meets up with an accident when the lorry they were travelling fell into a river. Vinayachandran escapes and Krishna Kurup is not found. He is believed to be killed in the accident. Krishna Kurup, is an insurance holder for a huge amount and his sons make arrangements to claim it stating that their father is killed in the accident. Krishna Kurup's boss, knowing that Krishna Kurup's family is getting a huge amount, tries to interfere with a fraud story. With the papers being arranged for insurance claim, Krishna Kurup surprisingly returns home alive after being in an Ayurvedic Heritage home under treatment nursing his injuries of accident. His return, however does not please his sons, Vinayachandran in special, who by then had laid some business plans eyeing at his father's insurance money. They force Krishna Kurup to stay home enclosed in a room without roaming outside so as to claim the insurance amount. Krishna Kurup's return is witnessed by his neighbor who believes that it is his ghost and he turns psychiotc. Krishna Kurup, unable to bear the humiliation of being locked up in the house and seeing that his sons care money more than him, finally decides to leave home one night. He is accompanied by his wife who asks him whether he is leaving her alone behind. The climax scene shows Krishna Kurup and his wife accompanied by his father also and the 3 travelling away from their children to lead a new life.

== Cast ==
- Thilakan as Krishna Kurup
- Balachandra Menon as Sudhakaran
- Jagadheesh as Vinayachandran
- Kaviyoor Ponnamma
- Krishnan Kutty Nair as Krishna Kurup's father
- Innocent as Adiyodi
- Sankaradi
- Jagathy Sreekumar
- Chippy
- Prem Kumar
- K. B. Ganesh Kumar
- Indrans as Unnivasu
- C. I. Paul
- Meena Ganesh as Adiyodi's wife
- Ragini (New)
- Jose Pellissery

== Soundtrack ==
Santhanagopalam

Soundtrack album by Johnson
- Released: 1994
- Genre: Film
- Language: Malayalam
- Label: Wilson Audios; T-Series

The film features songs composed by Johnson and written by V. Madhusoodanan Nair. The song Pradosha Kumkumam is composed in raga Mohanam.

No.	Song title	Singer
1	"Pradosha Kumkumam"	K. J. Yesudas
2	"Thaaram Thookum"	P. Jayachandran, Sujatha Mohan, Chorus
3	"Thinkal Thudukkumbozhente Mukham"	K. J. Yesudas
