= Jagathy =

Village in Thiruvananthapuram District, Kerala, India

Jagathy is a place within the city of Thiruvananthapuram in the state of Kerala, India. It lends its name to the city ward of which it is a part. It is famous for being the home of veteran Malayalam actor Jagathy Sreekumar. The Rajiv Gandhi Centre for Biotechnology is also located near Jagathy.
