= Pidakkozhi Koovunna Noottandu =

- DVD Cover
- Directed by: Viji Thampi
- Screenplay by: Sasidharan Arattuvazhi
- Story by: Urvashi
- Produced by: Urvashi
- Starring: Dileep; Urvashi; Manoj K. Jayan; Jagathy Sreekumar; Kalpana; K. P. A. C. Lalitha; Vinaya Prasad; Janardhanan; Sai Kumar
- Cinematography: Dinesh Baboo
- Edited by: A. Sreekar Prasad
- Music by: S. P. Venkatesh
- Distributed by: Prathiksha Pictures
- Release date: 15 October 1994
- Running time: 144 minutes
- Country: India
- Language: Malayalam

Pidakkozhi Koovunna Noottandu (transl. The century when the hen crows) is a 1994 Indian Malayalam-language comedy-drama film directed by Viji Thampi and written by Sasidharan Arattuvazhi from a story by Urvashi, who also produced the film. Starring Urvashi, Manoj K. Jayan, Dileep, Jagathy Sreekumar, Kalpana, K. P. A. C. Lalitha, Vinaya Prasad, Janardhanan, Ratheesh and Sai Kumar. The story revolves around paying guests in a female-only homestay who identify themselves as misandrists.

The film was a commercial success at the box office, and is widely considered one of the best female centric commercial films in Malayalam Cinema. It was remade in Telugu as Adalla Majaka in the next year.

== Plot ==
The story revolves around a paying guest home, run by Chindamani Ammal who is a determined misandrist due to a failed love affair with a man named Vishnunarayanan. Only misandrists are allowed as paying guests, with men being strictly prohibited from entering the premises. This also makes the guest home and its occupants, a source of gossip and interest for others in their neighborhood.

Ponnamma, one of the paying guests, hates men because of her parents being partial to her twin brother Ponnappan. Another guest, Nancy, is a lawyer and is engaged in a post divorce custody battle for her daughter with her ex-husband Tony Varghese. Vasundhara, a dancer, pretends to be a misandrist to please Chindamani Ammal. The woman are constantly in a feud with a group of neighborhood youths led by Sachidanandan aka Sachi. Bhagyarekha aka Bhagyam, comes to the area searching for a family friend named Vishwanathan, and becomes the victim of a prank played by Sachi and his friends. But the prank goes wrong, leading to Bhagyam getting heavily insulted, much to Sachi's shock. Following this, Bhagyam also moves into Chindamani Ammal's home, in the pretense that she is a misandrist. Sachi meanwhile seeks forgiveness from Bhagyam.

One day an unknown man enters their house and ends up being hit in the head by Chindamani Ammal. The assault leads to the man reverting into a child like state, who begins to call himself Ikru. The woman find themselves desperately trying to bring Ikru back to normal, while also hiding him from the watchful eyes of the curious neighbors. At one point, they almost get exposed, until they manage to dress up Ikru as a woman, and pass him off as a visiting female relative. Fed up with the situation, they decide to consult V N Potti, a reputed psychiatrist, to solve their problem, only to learn that V N Potti is actually the very same Vishnunarayanan who betrayed Chindamani Ammal. Eventually they reach an impasse, and Potti manages to save Ikru, whose real name is revealed to be Sathyaseelan, who later abruptly disappears from the guest house one morning. In the process, Chindamani Ammal and Potti reconcile their misunderstandings.

It is revealed that everything that happened was actually an elaborate plan by Potti and Sachi in order to reunite him and Chindamani Ammal, with Sathyaseelan being revealed as a stage actor. However a fallout occurs between Potti and Sathyaseelan, despite Sachi trying to solve it. Meanwhile Nancy wins her custody battle, only to be informed by Tony that their daughter has been hospitalized for the past few days, awaiting an operation. Tony deliberately kept this information hidden from Nancy, knowing she will not believe him until after she wins the case. Nancy reconciles with her husband as her daughter undergoes a successful operation. As things seem to finally be clearing up, Sathyaseelan abruptly returns to the guest home, much to the confusion of the women and Potti, though they manage to kick him out after sedating him. In between Bhagyarekha and Sachi patch up their problems after Sachi saves her from some goons and the police.

Meanwhile, Vasundhara falls in love with Binoy, a businessman who proposes to her. On seeing Binoy for the first time, Bhagyarekha's realizes she knows him, and she reveals her past to Sachi. Bhagyarekha, whose actual name is Sujatha Menon, used to work in a hotel in Madras. Binoy and his friend Douglas worked for a company, where Sujatha's cousin Gayathri gets a job interview. While visiting Gayathri before the interview in a hotel, Sujatha ends up witnessing Gayathri being assaulted and killed by a man named Nagarajan. Sujatha tries to fight back, resulting in Nagarajan accidentally falling from a window to his death. After realizing that Binoy and Douglas are complicit in this, Sujatha escaped from them and hid overnight in the hotel storeroom. A kindly innkeeper helps her escape, while also revealing to her that Binoy and Douglas are actually human traffickers, who lure unsuspecting women in the name the job interviews to be pimped, with the hotel manager also being their partner. Sujatha later learns that she has been implicated for the murder of Nagarajan, and Gayathri has been labelled as a thief. Binoy and Douglas are hunting her, intending to kill her before she reveals the truth. Realizing her presence will bring further danger to Gayathri's family, Sujatha left to find Vishwanathan, a family friend, to help her with the case, while changing her identity in fear of Binoy and Douglas.

Sujatha tries to tell the truth to Vasundhara, but Binoy convinces her and the other inmates that Sujatha is a liar and a murderer, causing them to alienate her and throw her out. She is arrested by the police, but as she gets in the police jeep, she realizes that they are actually fake police sent by Binoy and Douglas to capture her. Sachi and his friends arrive in time and stop the fake cops while Ponnamma, who sees everything, convinces the other inmates that Sujatha was telling the truth. They, along with other residents of the neighborhood, as well as Potti and Sathyaseelan, unite to fight back Binoy and Douglas' goons, and get them arrested, in the process exposing Binoy's trachery to Vasundhara.

In the end, the truth about Gayathri's death comes to light and Sujatha gets exonerated. She and Sachi become a couple, while Potti and Chindamani Ammal also reunite. Chindamani Ammal also lifts the ban for men from entering her house, her attitudes and misunderstandings having completely changed. When questioned by Potti, Sathyaseelan reveals that the reason he returned to the house is because he fell in love with Ponnamma and wished to confess to her, but was kicked out before he could. A startled Ponnamma accepts his proposal, as everyone laughs at the hearty conclusion.

== Cast ==
- Urvashi as Bhagyarekha aka Bhagyam / Sujatha Menon
- Manoj K Jayan as Sachidanandan
- Jagathy Sreekumar as Ikru/Sathyaseelan
- Kalpana in a dual role as
  - Ponnamma
  - Ponnappan, Ponnamma's brother
- Dileep as Kishore
- K. P. A. C. Lalitha as Chindamani Ammal
- Janardhanan as Dr. Vishnunarayanan Potti a.k.a. V N Potti
- Rudra as Vasundhara
- Sai Kumar as Binoy Viswam
- Vinaya Prasad as Adv. Nancy Joseph
- Ratheesh as Adv.Tony Varghese
- Sukumari as Ammalu
- Poojappura Ravi as Pappaswami
- Jagannathan as Vengidi
- Mavelikkara Ponnamma as Tony's Mother
- Philomina as Muthiyamma
- Nayana as Ammalu's daughter
- Ajay Ratnam as Douglas
- Viji Thampi as Rajeevan, hotel employee
- Kollam Thulasi
- Idavela Babu
- Yadu Krishnan
- Nandulal
