= List of Malayalam films of 1991 =

The following is a list of Malayalam films released in the year 1991.

Title	Director	Screenplay	Cast
Souhrudam	Shaji Kailas	Kaloor Dennis	Mukesh, Urvashi, Sai Kumar, Parvathy
Abhayam	Sivan		Madhu, Parvathy, Raghavan
Apoorvam Chilar	Kala Adoor	S. N. Swamy	Innocent, Jagathy Sreekumar, Parvathy, K.P.A.C. Lalitha
Njan Gandharvan	P. Padmarajan	P. Padmarajan	Nitish Bharadwaj, Suparna Anand
Chavettu Pada	Sekhar		
Ennum Nanmakal	Sathyan Anthikkad	Raghunath Paleri	Jayaram, Santhi Krishna, Sreenivasan, Shari, Saranya
Eagle	Ambili		P Sukumar, Poonam Dasgupta
Perumthachan	Ajayan	M. T. Vasudevan Nair	Thilakan, Prashanth, Monisha Unni, Vinaya Prasad
Ganamela	Ambili	Jagadish	Mukesh, Innocent, Geetha Vijayan
Aavanikunnile Kinnaripookkal	Paul Babu		Kakka Ravi, Karthika
Amaram	Bharathan	A. K. Lohithadas	Mammootty, Maathu, Murali, Ashokan
Raid	K. S. Gopalakrishnan		
Dhanam	Sibi Malayil	A. K. Lohithadas	Mohanlal, Murali, Charmila
Kakkathollayiram	V. R. Gopalakrishnan		Mukesh, Urvashi, Sai Kumar, Chithra
Pookkalam Varavayi	Kamal	Ranjith - P. R. Nathan	Jayaram, Rekha, Baby Shamili, Murali, Geetha, Sunitha
Parallel College	Thulasidas		Suresh Gopi, Geetha, Maathu
Oru Tharam Randu Tharam Moonu Tharam	P. K. Radhakrishnan		Sai Kumar, Chithra
Kuttapathram	R. Chandru		Suresh Gopi, Sreeja, Babu Antony
Aakasha Kottayile Sultan	Jayaraj	Renji Panicker	Sreenivasan, Saranya
Poonthenaruvi Chuvannu	Balu		
Agni Nilavu	N. Sankaran Nair		Jagadish, Ranjini
Raagam Anuragam	Nikhil		Mukesh, Madhuri
Mizhikal	Suresh Krishna		
Ezhunnallathu	Harikumar		Jayaram, Mukesh, Siddique, Sithara
Arangu	Chandrasekharan		Thilakan, Sai Kumar, Ashokan
Mookilla Rajyathu	Ashokan-Thaha	B. Jayachandran	Mukesh, Siddique, Thilakan, Jagathy, Vinaya Prasad
Nayam Vyakthamakkunnu	Balachandra Menon	Balachandra Menon	Mammootty, Shanthi Krishna
Bharatham	Sibi Malayil	A. K. Lohithadas	Mohanlal, Urvashi, Nedumudi Venu, Lakshmi
Omana Swapnangal	P. K. Balakrishnan		
Vishnulokam	Kamal	T. A. Razzaq	Mohanlal, Shanthi Krishna, Urvashi
Ente Sooryaputhrikku	Fazil	Fazil	Srividya, Amala, Suresh Gopi
Nattu Vishesham	Paul Njarackel		Mukesh, Siddique, Janardhanan
Thudar Katha	Dennis Joseph	Dennis Joseph	Sai Kumar, Maathu, Srinivasan
Georgootty C/O Georgootty	K. K. Haridas	Ranjith	Jayaram, Sunitha, Thilakan,
Amina Tailors	Sajan		Ashokan, Parvathy, Rajan P. Dev
Teenage Love	J. Krishnachandra		
Inspector Balram	I. V. Sasi	T. Damodaran	Mammootty, Geetha, Urvashi
Kankettu	Rajan Balakrishnan	Sreenivasan	Jayaram, Sreenivasan, Shobana, Geetha Vijayan
Sundhari Kakka	Mahesh Soman		Rekha, Jagadish, Siddique, Suresh Gopi
Mahazar	C. P. Vijayakumar		Sukumaran, M G Soman
Vasthuhara	G. Aravindan		Mohanlal, Neena Gupta, Shobana
Adayalam	K. Madhu	S. N. Swamy	Mammootty, Shobhana, Rekha, Murali
Kalamorukkam	B. S. Indran		Ashokan, Jalaja
Innathe Program	P. G. Viswambaran	Kaloor Dennis	Mukesh, Siddhique, Radha
Cheppukilukkana Changathi	Kaladharan		Mukesh, Saranya, Jagadish
Miss Stella	Sasi		
Keli	Bharathan	John Paul	Jayaram, Charmila, Murali
Daivasahayam Lucky Centre	Rajan Chevayoor		Risabava, Sreeja
Mimics Parade	Thulasidas	Kaloor Dennis	Siddique, Sunitha, Jagadish, Ashokan, Zainuddin, Suchitra
Koodikazhcha	T. S. Suresh Babu		Jayaram, Jagadish, Urvashi, Sukumaran, Babu Antony
Manmadha Sarangal	Baby		
Kanalkkattu	Sathyan Anthikkad	A K Lohithadas	Mammootty, Jayaram, Urvashi, Murali
Mukha Chithram	Suresh Unnithan	J.Pallassery	Jayaram, Urvashi, Siddique, Sunitha, Jagadish
Bhoomika	I. V. Sasi	John Paul	Jayaram, Suresh Gopi, Mukesh
Vashyam	Suresh		
Uncle Bun	Bhadran		Mohanlal, Khushbu, Charmila
Anaswaram	Jomon	T. A. Razzaq	Mammootty, Shwetha Menon, Innocent
Kilukkam	Priyadarsan	Venu Nagavally	Mohanlal, Revathi, Jagathy, Innocent, Thilakan
Ottayal Pattalam	T. K. Rajeev Kumar	Kalavoor Ravikumar	Mukesh, Madhoo
Aadhyamayi	J. Vattoli		
Nagarathil Samsara Vishayam	Prashanth		Jagadish, Siddique, Chitra
Ulladakkam	Kamal	P. Balachandran	Mohanlal, Amala, Shobhana
Kadinjool Kalyanam	Rajasenan	Reghunath Paleri	Jayaram, Urvashi, Suchitra, Jagadish
Aanaval Mothiram	G. S. Vijayan	T. Damodaran	Sreenivasan, Suresh Gopi, Saranya,
Venal Kinavukal	K. S. Sethumadhavan	M. T. Vasudevan Nair	Sudheesh, Monisha
Post Box No. 27	P. Anil		Mukesh, Siddique, Rudra
Kizhakkunarum Pakshi	Venu Nagavalli	Venu Nagavalli	Mohanlal, Rekha, Shankar
Sandhesam	Sathyan Anthikkad	Sreenivasan	Thilakan, Jayaram, Sreenivasan, Siddique, Kaviyoor Ponnamma
Kalari	Prassi Mallur		Siddique, Rizabawa
Onnaam Muhurtham	Rahim Chelavoor		Mukesh, Sukumaran, Archana
Naagam	K. S. Gopalakrishnan		
Godfather	Siddique-Lal	Siddique-Lal	Mukesh, N. N. Pillai, Thilakan, Innocent, Kanaka, Jagadish, Philomina
Nettippattam	Kaladharan	Sasidharan Arattuvazhi	Sreenivasan, Jagadish, Rekha
Chakravarthy	A. Sreekumar		Suresh Gopi, Kasthuri
Neelagiri	I. V. Sasi	Ranjith	Mammootty, Madhoo, Sunitha
Kadalora Kattu	Jomon		Suresh Gopi, Manoj K. Jayan, Chithra
Koumara Swapnangal	K. S. Gopalakrishnan		
Premolsavam	M. S. Unni		
Sandhwanam	Sibi Malayil		Nedumudi Venu, Meena, Suresh Gopi, Rekha, Bharathi
Kilukkampetti	Shaji Kailas		Jayaram, Suchitra Krishnamoorthi
Abhimanyu	Priyadarsan	T. Damodaran	Mohanlal, Geetha
Oru Prathyeka Ariyippu	R. S. Nair		Vijayaraghavan
Kadavu	M. T. Vasudevan Nair	M. T. Vasudevan Nair	Santhosh Antony, Balan K. Nair
Yamanam	Bharath Gopi	George Onakkoor	Archana, Santha Devi, Syama, Nedumudi Venu
Achan Pattalam	Noranadu Ramachandran		
Bali	V. K. Pavithran		
Aparaahnam	M. P. Sukumaran Nair		Babu Antony, Murali
Vembanad	Kaviyoor Sivaprasad		
Neduveerppukal	Suresh Heblikar		
Vasavadatta			
Athirathan	Pradeep Kumar		Suresh Gopi, Geetha
Karppooradeepam	George Kithu		Sidhique, Shanthi Krishna
Aviraamam			
Oru Yaathrayude Anthyam			

== Dubbed films ==
Title	Director	Story	Screenplay	Cast
Kattu Veeran	Jabir Mubin			
Moordhanyam	Sunilkumar Desai			
Goodbye To Madras	K. S. Gopalakrishnan			
Ina Pravukal	Suraj R. Barjathya			
