= Varkala Sathyan =

Indian film, TV and stage actor

- Born: Narayanan Sathyaseelan; 20th century
- Occupation: Actor
- Parent(s): P. Narayanan and Kamalakshi
- Website: varkalasathyan.com

Varkala Sathyan (born 20th century as Narayanan Sathyaseelan) is an Indian film, stage and television actor.

He has acted in over twelve Malayalam films, five Malayalam television serials and two Arabic television serials.

== Career ==
Sathyan started his career in 1965 at All India Radio, Kozhikode, and moved to Radio Abudhabi, United Arab Emirates, in 1970.

== Acted films ==
Year	Film	Director	Role
1988	Thanthram	Joshi	Church Priest
1989	Adharvam	Dennis Joseph	Brahmin
1990	Innale	Padmarajan	Hospital Attender
1990	Varthamana Kaalam	I.V Sasi	Doctor
1991	Mukha Chitram	Suresh Unnithan	Registrar in Office
1992	Aardram	Suresh Unnithan	Pepper seller
1992	Dhaivathinte Vikruthikal	Lenin Rajendran	Chaathu
1993	Arthana	I.V Sasi	Doctor
1993	Kanyakumariyil oru Kavitha	Vinayan	Hawker
1994	Bhagyavaan	Suresh Unnithan	Politician
2000	Dhada Sahib	Vinayan	Police Officer

== Acted television serials ==
Year	Serial	Language	Director	Role
	Sthree	Malayalam	Syam Sunder	Bus conductor
	Anveshanan	Malayalam	Lisa Baby	Doctor
	Bhagya Nakshatram	Malayalam	Rajasenen	Abkari Contractor
	Amma	Malayalam	Majeed Maranchery	Father
	Air Mail	Malayalam	Sasi Narayana	Brahmin
	Ashafaan	Arabic	Mangoosh	Indian Doctor
	Thawal Aamer Thamaasa	Arabic	Ali Thameemi	Hotel Manager

== See also ==
- List of Malayalam film actors
- List of people from Kerala
