= Thaha =

Indian film director, writer (active 1985– )

- Other name: Ashokan Thaha
- Occupations: Director; Writer
- Years active: 1985–2011

Thaha is an Indian film director and writer, known primarily for his slapstick comedy movies.

== Career ==
Earlier Thaha worked as an assistant director in films including Rajavinte Makan, Bhoomiyile Rajakkanmar, Kakkothikkavile Appooppan Thaadikal, and Varnam to directors such as Kamal and Thampi Kannanthanam. In 1991, he co-directed with Ashokan the film Mookkillarajyathu, as Ashokan-Thaha. Later he went on to direct films independently.

== Filmography ==
=== As assistant director ===
Year	Title
1985	Aa Neram Alppa Dooram
1986	Rajavinte Makan
1987	Bhoomiyile Rajakkanmar
1988	Kakkothikkavile Appooppan Thaadikal
1988	Orkkapurathu
1989	Varnam
1989	Unnikrishnante Adyathe Christmas

=== As director ===
Year	Title	Other notes
1990	Saandram	Co-directed with director Ashokan.
1991	Mookkillarajyathu	Co-directed with director Ashokan.
1994	Varaphalam	Debut as an independent director.
1997	Gajaraja Manthram	
1997	Five Star Hospital	
2001	Ee Parakkum Thalika	
2002	Sundara Travels	Tamil film; remake of Ee Parakum Thalika
2004	Kerala House Udan Vilpanakku	
2004	Thekkekkara Superfast	
2009	Kappal Muthalaali	
2009	Hailesa	
2011	Pachuvum Kovalanum	
