= Vendor Daniel State Licency =

1994 Indian Malayalam-language film

- Directed by: Balu Kiriyath
- Screenplay by: Kaloor Dennis
- Story by: Francis T. Mavelikkara
- Produced by: K. E. Ahmed
- Starring: Thilakan; Jagadish; Vinduja Menon; Jagathy Sreekumar
- Cinematography: Sanjeev Sankar
- Edited by: G. Murali
- Music by: S. P. Venkatesh
- Production company: Aseem International
- Distributed by: Jubilant Release
- Release date: 1994
- Country: India
- Language: Malayalam

Vendor Daniel State Licency is a 1994 Indian Malayalam-language film directed by Balu Kiriyath and written by Kaloor Dennis, starring Thilakan, Jagadish, Jagathy Sreekumar and Vinduja Menon.

== Plot ==
Vendor Daniel is a selfish and greedy person. Mohanan Pillai is the assistant to Daniel. Joy, the son of Daniel doesn't approve of the deeds of Daniel. Daniel's wife, Annamma is very religious and she also disagrees with Daniel's doings. Karavalapadu is an old feudal lord who lost his property because of the land reform brought by the government. Joy used to meet Seetha, sister of Adv. Balagopalan to relieve his mind. Daniel also has corrupted officers as mentors. Daniel fixed Joy's marriage with a rich girl, of which Joy doesn't approve. Daniel used a dirty trick to get the property of the feudal lord, making his son Joy as the son of Karavalpadu. One day while Joy talks with Seetha, Mohanan Pillai happened to see this and tell his boss. Daniel is very upset because of this and tries to separate Joy and Seetha, but Joy took this as revenge and married Seetha. Daniel disapproves of the marriage, but Adv. Balagopalan, brother of Seetha, welcomes the couple to his home. This provokes Daniel and he plans to kill Seetha with help of corrupted officers. On Christmas night, with the help of corrupted police officers, he releases a criminal to kill Seetha. To try to save Seetha from the criminal, Joy accidentally gets stabbed and dies. This news makes Daniel very sad. The lawyers of Balagopalan try to involve the superintendent of police in the murder case.

The corrupt police officers are afraid of the involvement of the superintendent of police in this case and the try to frame Balagoplan as the murderer. But the Superintendent of Police gets clues about the corrupt officers and makes a plan to trap them. Meanwhile, Daniel gives his office to Mohanan Pillai. The Police Superintendent assigns two police officers undercover to find the clues about the crime. At the same time, Daniel gives money to the corrupted officers to escape from this case. The officers, in undercover, create a scene in front of a bar and beat a Police Circle Inspector which comes there, thus taken into custody. There they meet the convict which who murdered Joy. The officers in undercover happen to hear the conversation of the Sub-inspector and convict about the escape plans and involvement of Daniel and higher officers in this case. The Superintendent catches Daniel. Due to over anxiety and sadnesses Daniel commit suicide by adding poison to milk and shares it with Annamma. After they drank the tainted milk, Daniel reveals that poison added to milk and also he wants his wife to die along with him because nothing is left for hope after their beloved son's death. Annamma mourns to reveal that she is going to become a grandma for his late son's child. They both dead after that while Daniel understand his misfortune before death

== Cast ==
- Thilakan as Vendor Daniel/Babykutty Daniel
- Jagadish as Adv. Balagopalan Menon
- Sudheesh as Joy Daniel
- Chippy as Seetha
- Jagathy Sreekumar
- Kaviyoor Ponnamma as Annamma Daniel
- Narendra Prasad as Udayanoor Karavalpadu
- Beena Antony as Thresia
- K. P. A. C. Sunny as Dy.SP KrishnanKutty Nair
- Indrans as Sundaran
- Krishnankutty Nair as Govindan Pillai
- Bobby Kottarakkara as Kunjiraman
- Kollam Thulasi as CI Chandran
- Tony as SI Rameshan
- Shivaji as SI Abdullah
- Abraham Koshy as Arbaz Khan
- Usha Udayan as Saraswathi Kunjamma

== Soundtrack ==
All lyrics are written by Kaithapram Damodaran; all music is composed by S. P. Venkatesh.

No.	Title	Artist(s)	Length
1.	"Leela Maadhavam"	Kaithapram Damodaran
2.	"Leela Maadhavam"	K. S. Chithra
3.	"Lilly Vidarum"	M. G. Sreekumar
4.	"Lilly Vidarum"	K. S. Chithra
5.	"Neelakkanna"	K. S. Chithra
6.	"Yesuve Naadha"	G. Venugopal
