= Ranjini (disambiguation) =

Ranjini is a form of Carnatic music.

Ranjini may also refer to:

- Ranjini Haridas, a TV anchor and model
- Ranjini (actress)
