= Poova Thalaya (TV series) =

- Genre: Drama
- Created by: Hari Baskaran
- Written by: K. Sukumaran
- Screenplay by: P. Ragavan (Dialogue)
- Directed by: S. P. Rajkumar
- Starring: Sithara; Dharshna Sripal Golecha; Kishor Dev
- Theme music composer: Ajesh
- Opening theme: "Thai Polave"; K. S. Chithra; Namitha Babu (Vocals); Pa. Vijay (Lyrics)
- Country of origin: India
- Original language: Tamil
- No. of seasons: 1

Production
- Producers: Anuradha Sarin; R. Sathish Kumar
- Cinematography: Ma. Ilayaraja
- Editor: N.A.V.Vishwa
- Camera setup: Multi-camera
- Running time: 20–22 minutes per episode
- Production companies: Sun Entertainment; Citram Studios

Original release
- Network: Sun TV
- Release: 30 October 2023 – 13 July 2024

Poova Thalaya (transl. Heads or Tails?) is a 2023-2024 Indian Tamil-language television series directed by S. P. Rajkumar and starring Sithara, Dharshna Sripal Golecha, Suveta Shrimpton and Kishor Dev. The show created by Hari Baskaran and Produced by Anuradha Sarin and R. Sathish Kumar under Citram Studios and Sun Entertainment.

It aired on Sun TV from 30 October 2023 to 13 July 2024 on Monday and Saturday. It is also available for streaming on Sun NXT.

== Cast ==
=== Main ===
- Sithara as Rajeshwari Chakaravarthy
  - Chakaravarthy's wife's and Surya, Illamathy's mother; Pandi's adoptive mother; Muthu's sister.
- Dharshna Sripal Golecha as Soundharya Surya; Surya's Wife
- Suveta Shrimpton as Ilamathy Kathir (Kathir's wife and Surya's Sister)
- Kishor Dev as Surya
  - Soundharya's husband and Rajeshwari's son.

=== Recurring ===
- Vijay Babu as Chakravarthy (Rajeshwari's husband)
- Ramji as Muthu (Rajeshwari's brother)
- Latha Rao as Selvi (Muthu's wife)
- Shiva Subramanian as Mohan (Chakravarthy's brother)
- Ranjana/Remyaa Joseph as Neelaveni (Mohan's wife)
- Soumya as Rudhra (Chakravarthy's sister)
- R. S. Shivaji as (Soundharya's father, dead)
- Pandi Kamal as Pandi
- Vaiyapuri as Singam
- Rindhu Ravi as Kamatchi (Lavanya, Kowsalya and Soundharya's mother)
- Durgaa as Lavanya Parthiban (Parthiban's wife and Soundharya's first elder sister)
- Salma Arun as Kowsalya Kannan (Soundharya's second elder sister)
- Madhumika Srinivasu as Monika (Neelaveni's daughter)
- Feroz Khan as Parthiban (Lavanya's husband)
- Harish G as Kannan (Kowsalya's husband)
- Rohith Balaiya as Kathir ( Ilamathy's husband and Soundharya's brother)

=== Special appearances ===
- Vijay as Arjun
- Queency Stanly as Deepika
- Keerthana as Malini
- M. J. Sriram as (Malini's husband and Deepika's father)

== Production ==
=== Development ===
After the ending of the Sun TV's serial Magarasi, its production company 'Citram Studios' decide to produce Poova Thalaya, to be produced by Anuradha Sarin and R. Sathish Kumar under the banner of Citram Studios. The show is a fresh take on the mother-in-law and daughter-in-law relationship.

Initially, the title of the serial was named 'Iravi', After some reasons the first promo was released in the name of as 'Poova Thalaya' on 18 October 2023.

=== Casting ===
Actress Sithara was cast as Rajeshwari, marking her return after seven years in Tamil television industry. Dharshna Sripal Golecha was cast as Sountharya, marking her first project as a lead. Kishor Dev was cast as the male lead, Surya. Made his comeback after Pachakili.

=== Release ===
The show premiered from 30 October 2023 at 12:30 (IST), replacing Pandavar Illam, and ended on 13 July 2024 ended with 218 episodes.
