= Pachuvum Kovalanum =

- Directed by: Thaha
- Written by: Francis T. Mavelikkara
- Produced by: Elvin John
- Starring: Mukesh; Suraj Venjaramood; Meghna Raj; Jyothirmayi
- Music by: Mohan Sithara; Rajeev Alunkal (lyrics)
- Production company: Eva productions
- Release date: 14 October 2011
- Country: India
- Language: Malayalam

Pachuvum Kovalanum is a 2011 Indian Malayalam-language film directed by Thaha, starring Mukesh, Suraj Venjaramood, Meghna Raj and Jyothirmayi in the lead roles.

== Plot ==
The film producer of a serial is killed during its shooting. The director is accused of it as he is the producer's son-in-law.

== Cast ==
- Mukesh as Thomaskutty
- Suraj Venjaramood as Joseph
- Nelson as Kuttappan
- Meghna Raj as Sukanya
- Jyothirmayi as Sneha
- Jagathi Sreekumar as Producer Esthappan
- Riyaz Khan as ACP John Kuruvila
- Innocent as Bhadranpillai
- Shivaji Guruvayoor as Production controller Paulos Tharakan
- Kalpana as Chinna
- Narayanankutty
- Sona Nair as Anna
- Lakshmi Priya
