= Kadinjool Kalyanam =

- VCD Cover Designed
- Directed by: Rajasenan
- Written by: Reghunath Paleri
- Produced by: P. Vijayan
- Starring: Jayaram; Urvashi; Innocent
- Cinematography: Ramachandra Babu
- Edited by: G. Murali
- Music by: Songs: Raveendran; Score: Johnson
- Distributed by: Charangattu Release
- Release date: 26 September 1991
- Country: India
- Language: Malayalam

Kadinjool Kalyanam (transl. Maiden wedding) is a 1991 Indian Malayalam-language family drama film directed by Rajasenan and starring Jayaram, Urvashi, and Innocent. The film marks the first collaboration between director Rajasenan and actor Jayaram. It was also dubbed in Tamil as Ennavale Adi Ennavale, with actor Vikram lending his voice for Jayaram.

== Plot ==
Sudhakaran is a manager in an interstate bus office. He loves Ramani, and they plan to marry after she completes her studies. One day, Sudhakaran's father, a palmist, reads Ramani's palm and predicts that their marriage will end in Sudhakaran's death. Heartbroken, Ramani decides not to marry Sudhakaran. Angered by his father's prediction, Sudhakaran develops contempt for him. Ramani marries another man, which leaves Sudhakaran depressed.

Panicker notices his favorite employee's state of mind and promises to find him a bride worthy of his respect and love. Although hesitant, Sudhakaran agrees and marries Hridayakumari.

Hridayakumari, the new bride, is a simple girl with the stubbornness and willfulness of a child, which frustrates Sudhakaran and his mother. They suspect she is mentally challenged. One thing leads to another and one day, Sudhakaran accepts the telemarketing tactics of a contract killer and pays to get Hridayakumari killed. However, Sudhakaran comes home to see that Hridayakumari has had a change of heart. He now wants to back out of this decision to kill her. He also learns that she is pregnant. Sudhakaran desperately tries to contact the contract killers to ask them to back out, but he can't. He panics and tries to protect Hridayakumari from the unknown possibility of a murder attempt. The climax of the film reveals the characters' multi-dimensional natures.

== Cast ==
- Jayaram as Sudhakaran
- Urvashi as Hridayakumari
- K. P. A. C. Lalitha as Chinnamalu (Sudhakaran's mother)
- Innocent as Pathira Panicker
- Jagathy Sreekumar as Sivaraman
- Suchitra Murali as Ramani
- Oduvil Unnikrishnan as Pothuval
- Mamukkoya as Imbichi Koya
- Krishnankutty Nair as Veerabhadran (Sudhakaran's father)
- Kuthiravattam Pappu as Mathai
- Jagadish as Anthony D'Silva
- Rajan P. Dev as Thalaivar Vellai Chami
- Valsala Menon as Bhavaniyamma
- Unnimary as Kadambari (Panicker's wife)
- Sadiq as Prakashan (Mandhan Prakashan)
- T. R. Omana
- Sangeetha as Pankajam (Pothuval's wife)
- Bobby Kottarakkara as Sankaran
- Kalabhavan Rahman as Gangadharan

== Soundtrack ==
The film features a musical score Johnson and two songs composed by Raveendran, with lyrics by Bichu Thirumala, who won his second Kerala State Film Award for this movie.

1. Manassil Ninnum Manassilekk - K. J. Yesudas
2. Pulari Viriyum Mumbe - K. J. Yesudas

== Awards ==
Urvashi received the Kerala State Film Award for Best Actress.

Bichu Thirumala was awarded the Kerala State Film Award for Best Lyricist.
