= Sunitha (actress) =

Indian actress

- Born: Sunitha Venugopal Sivaramakrishnan; Kerala, India
- Other names: Kodai Mazhai Vidhya, Vidyashree
- Occupation: Actor
- Years active: 1986–1996
- Spouse: Raj (m. 1996)
- Children: Shashank (b.1998)

Sunitha is a former Indian actress known for her roles in films made in South India from 1986 to 1996.

== Movie career ==
She entered the film industry through the movie Kodai Mazhai, a 1986 Tamil movie directed by Muktha S. Sundar, with music by Ilayaraja, starring Rajinikanth (Not Major, Guest Role), Prasad and Lakshmi and Ponmana Selvan (1989), starring Vijayakanth, directed by P. Vasu. The same year saw the release of Vijayakanth's movie Rajanadai and Varavu Nalla Uravu (1990), a family movie, for which director Visu won the Tamil Nadu State Award for Best Story Writer. She was also in Nenja Thottu Sollu a Tamil movie, a female oriented story based on a character called Pongona, directed by T. N. Kanna.

She starred in the Malayalam movies Nirabhedangal, directed by Sajan, starring Prathap Pothen, Ambika and Geetha and Kanikanum Neram, directed by Rajasenan, starring Ratheesh and Saritha in 1987. Her popular movies include Mrugaya, a Malayalam action drama written by A. K. Lohithadas and directed by IV Sasi; starring Mammootty Appu, directed by Dennis Joseph and written by Sreekumaran Thampi, starring Mohanlal and K. R. Vijaya; Gajakesariyogam, directed by P. G. Viswambharan, starring Innocent and Mukesh, and Neelagiri, directed by I. V. Sasi, written by Ranjith and Georgootty C/O Georgootty, produced under the banner of Chandragiri Productions. It was Haridas' directorial debut. Haridas won the State Award for Best New face Director for this film, starring Jayaram and Thilakan, She starred in Mimics Parade and Kasargod Khader Bhai, comedy films directed by Thulasidas, starring Siddique and Jagadeesh; Pookkalam Varavayi, directed by Kamal, written by Ranjith and Nathan, starring Jayaram and Shamili; Savidham, directed by George Kithu, starring Nedumudi Venu and Santhi Krishna; Snehasagaram, directed by Sathyan Anthikkad, starring Murali and Manoj K. Jayan; Mukha Chithram, directed by Suresh Unnithan; Samooham, directed by Sathyan Anthikad, with Suhasini Manirathnam and Suresh Gopi; Vatsalyam, directed by Cochin Haneefa, written by Lohithadas, starring Mammootty and Geetha; Nandini Oppol, directed by Mohan Kuplari, starring Geetha and Nedumudi Venu; Sowbhagyam, directed by Sandhya Mohan; Pradakshinam, directed by Pradeep Chockli, starring Manoj K. Jayan and Balachandran Chullikkadu, and Kaliveedu, a family drama exploring a marital relationship, directed by Sibi Malayil, starring Jayaram and Manju Warrier.

She entered the Kannada film industry in 1990 through the movies Anukulakobba Ganda, directed by M. S. Rajashekar, starring Raghavendra Rajkumar; Aralida Hoovugalu, directed by Chi Dattharaj, starring Shivarajkumar and Srinath; Puksatte Ganda Hotte Tumba Unda a typical drama movie directed by Raj Kishore, starring Ambareesh and Roll Call Ramakrishna, directed by B. Rama Murthy, produced by S. R. Raajeshwari, with music by Upendra Kumar, starring Ananth Nag and Devraj.

She has paired with leading Indian actors such as Mammootty, Mohanlal, Jagadish, Mukesh, Jayaram, Suresh Gopi, Ambareesh, Anant Nag, Shivaraj Kumar, Raghavendra Rajkumar and many others.

== As a dancer ==
Sunitha, alternatively known as Kodai Mazhai Vidya and Vidyasree, is a well known Indian classical dancer. She is trained in the Bharata Natyam style of dancing. She began dancing at the age of 3 and did her arangetram at the age of 11. She has had the privilege of experiencing the old tradition of "Gurukulam". She received her training in the Vazhuvoor style of Bharatanatyam from Padmashree Vazhuvoor Ramaiyya Pillai and his son Kalaimamani Vazhuvoor R. Samaraj. To date, she has given more than 200 dance recitals all over the world. She has performed dances in many stage shows all over the world with Amitabh Bachchan, Mammootty, Mohanlal, Vineeth etc.

Sunitha owns and serves as artistic director at the Nrithyanjali School of Dance, based in United States. She has enriched the cultural life of South Carolina by dedicating herself to teaching and performing classical dance over the past ten years.

== Personal life ==
She is born to Venugopal Shivaramakrishnan and Bhuvana in Palakkad, Kerala(3). She married Raj in 1996 and has a son, Shashaank, born in 1998. She currently resides in South Carolina, United States with her family.

== Filmography ==
Year	Film	Role	Language	Notes
1986	Kodai Mazhai	Vidhya	Tamil	Debut Movie as Heroine
1987	Maaveeran	Helina	Tamil	
1987	Kanikanum Neram	Indu	Malayalam	
1987	Neram Nalla Irukku	Rukku	Tamil	
1987	Nirabhedangal	Indu	Malayalam	
1987	Oorai Therinjikitten	Vidhya	Tamil	
1988	Uzhaithu Vaazha Vendum	Rani	Tamil	
1989	Mrugaya	Bhagyalakshmi	Malayalam	Vettaikkaran Siluva in Tamil; Mrugam in Telugu
1989	Ponmana Selvan	Radha	Tamil	Gharana Raja in Telugu
1989	Dravidan	Sarada	Tamil	
1989	Rajanadai	Thenmozhi	Tamil	
1990	Appu	Sarojini	Malayalam	
1990	Anukoolakkobba Ganda	Radha	Kannada	
1990	Gajakesariyogam	Karthika	Malayalam	
1990	Varavu Nalla Uravu	Valarmathi	Tamil	
1991	Neelagiri	Lakshmi	Malayalam	Telugu as Rowdy Rajyam
1991	Roll Call Ramakrishna	Swapna	Kannada	
1991	Mimics Parade	Sandhya Cheriyan	Malayalam	
1991	Kollur Kala	Rani	Kannada	
1991	Georgootty C/O Georgootty	Alice	Malayalam	
1991	Irikku MD Akathundu	Ancy Sreedharan	Malayalam	
1991	Aralida Hoovugalu	Sudha	Kannada	
1991	Pookkalam Varavayi	Thulasi	Malayalam	
1991	Utharakandam		Malayalam	
1991	Kunjikiliye Koodevide		Malayalam	
1991	Mukha Chithram	Sunanda	Malayalam	
1991	Puksatte Ganda Hotte Tumba Vunda	Revathi	Kannada	
1992	Snehasaagaram	Kaveri	Malayalam	
1992	Mukhamudhra	Devi	Malayalam	
1992	Manthrikacheppu	Shyama	Malayalam	
1992	Aardram	Sainaba	Malayalam	
1992	Savidham	Neelima	Malayalam	
1992	Ponnurukkum Pakshi	Amminikutty	Malayalam	
1992	Nenja Thottu Chollu	Pongana	Tamil	
1992	Kasargod Khader Bhai	Sandhya Cheriyan	Malayalam	
1992	Poochakkaru Mani Kettum	Radhika	Malayalam	
1993	Karpagam Vanthachu	Radha	Tamil	Telugu as Bejawada Rowdy
1993	Sowbhagyam	Indhu	Malayalam	
1993	Vakkeel Vasudev	Sridevi	Malayalam	
1993	Aagneyam	Ramani	Malayalam	
1993	Vatsalyam	Sudha	Malayalam	
1993	Addeham Enna Iddeham	Mercy	Malayalam	
1993	Samooham	Radhika	Malayalam	
1994	Nandini Oppol	Maya	Malayalam	
1994	Pradakshinam	Sudha	Malayalam	
1995	Chiranjeevi Rajagowda	Vasantha	Kannada	
1996	Kaliveedu	Urmila	Malayalam	
1997	Adimai Sangili	Arkani	Tamil	
2011	Again Kasargod Khader Bhai	Sandhya Cheriyan	Malayalam	Archive footage Cameo

== TV serial ==
- Ini Njan Onnu Visramikkatte - DD Malayalam serial
