= Francis T. Mavelikkara =

Malayalam playwright (born 1960)

- Born: 16 March 1960 (age 66); Mavelikkara, Alappuzha district, Kerala, India
- Occupation: Playwright
- Spouse: Maria
- Children: 3
- Awards: Kerala Sahitya Akademi Award for Drama; Kerala Sangeetha Nataka Akademi Award; Abu Dhabi Sakthi Award

Francis T. Mavelikkara (born March 16, 1960) is an Indian Malayalam playwright. He has received many awards including the Kerala Sahitya Akademi Award, the Kerala Sangeetha Nataka Akademi Award, the State Government Award for Best drama script multiple times, the Abu Dhabi Sakthi Award, and the KCBC's Best Play Award.

== Biography ==
Fransis was born on March 16, 1960, in Mavelikkara to Denz Fernandes and Victoria. He studied at Mavelikkara Boys High School and Government ITI, Chengannur. He has written several street plays during this time.

=== Personal life ===
Fransis and his wife Maria have three children, Hebbian, Fujin and Angel.

== Career ==
The first professional play written by Francis was Suryakantham, written in 1984. He has written plays for many leading theatre groups in Kerala, including K.P.A.C., Kalidasa Kalakendram, Kollam Assisi, Kanhirappally Amala, Swadeshabhimani, Akshara Jwala, and Sarathi. Out of the six plays he wrote for K.P.A.C, four won the Best Play award.

The play Amma, his 350th play, is an independent adaptation of The Caucasian Chalk Circle, a play written by the German playwright Bertolt Brecht during World War II.

Francis also wrote the screenplay for two Malayalam films Patchuvum Kovalanum, and Vendor Daniel state licensee.

== Awards and honors ==
Francis received the Kerala State Government's award for best drama script 8 times. He received awards for his plays Samavarthanam in 1997, Ayalkkoottam in 1999, Adhyapika in 2000, Asthamikkatha Sooryan in 2006, Ottamarathanal in 2014, Oru Nazhi Mannu in 2017, and Veritta Kazhchakal (written for the Ambalappuzha Akshara Jhavala) in 2018. In 2021, he received state government's best drama script award for plays, Makkalude Shraddhak written for Thiruvananthapuram Sanghachethana and Amma written for Kollam Kalidasa Kalakendra. He received the award for best writing at the State Professional Drama Competition in 2014 for his writing of the plays Abraham and Ottamarathanal.

The book Dravida Vritham received the Kerala Sahitya Akademi Award in 2007 and in 2015 he received the 'Kalashree Award' by Kerala Sangeetha Nataka Akademi. He has also won several other awards, including the Abu Dhabi Sakthi Award in 2004, the Campissery Karunakaran Award, the Kozhissery Balaraman Award in 2008, the Jaycees Foundation's Comprehensive Contribution Award in 2015 the Kerala Catholic Bishops' Council's Best Play Award (three times), the O. Madhavan Award, the Kallumala Karunakaran Award, the Paravur George Memorial Award and the EMS Cultural Studies Center's award.
