= Varavu Nalla Uravu =

- Title card
- Directed by: Visu
- Written by: Visu
- Produced by: Rajam Balachandar; Pushpa Kandaswamy
- Starring: Visu; Annapoorna; Rekha; Vidhyashree; Kishmu; Ilavarasan
- Cinematography: N. Balakrishnan
- Edited by: Ganesh–Kumar
- Music by: Shankar–Ganesh
- Production company: Kavithalayaa Productions
- Release date: 14 April 1990
- Running time: 139 minutes
- Country: India
- Language: Tamil

Varavu Nalla Uravu (transl. Good family relations are valued) is a 1990 Indian Tamil-language drama film, written and directed by Visu and produced by Kavithalayaa Productions. The film stars Visu, Annapoorna, Rekha, Vidhyashree, Kishmu and Ilavarasan. It is about two contrasting families whose patriarchs are best friends. While one family is a happy one to start with, the other is a machine-like family devoid of love.

Varavu Nalla Uravu is loosely based on the 1937 film Make Way for Tomorrow, and was remade into Telugu as Dabbu Bhale Jabbu and in Malayalam as Achan Kombathu Amma Varampathu. The film was released on 14 April 1990, and won Visu the Tamil Nadu State Film Award for Best Story Writer.

== Plot ==
Ambalavanan has lived and worked in Marakkanam all his life. He retires from King Sea Foods company with a grand farewell from his Manager and colleagues. After coming home, he feels a slight inferiority complex that he is no longer working. His wife Kamatchi tells him that his sons will take care of him henceforth. Meanwhile Chandrasekar, Ambalavanan's best friend, is an alcoholic, and doesn't speak much to his sons (Guru) and Nirmal. Guru marries Uma, an orphan, in a Registrar Office, and brings her home. Chandrasekar and Nirmal both don't respect her and treat her like an outsider by paying money for the food that she makes at home. Guru explains to her the reason why his family is disoriented. Apparently when he and his brother were kids, Chandrasekar's mother tortured the children's mother and burnt her to death. The two children who were witnesses to the incident testified in court and the grandmother is hanged to death by law. This entire incident caused a trauma and since that day Chandrasekar stopped showing love and affection and he and his sons have been living like machines, and don't speak to each other. Guru asks Uma to turn this family around and bring love into their lives.

Meanwhile Valarmathi, Ambalavanan's youngest daughter is friends in college with Nirmal. While both are studying math in Nirmal's house, Ambalavanan who comes to see Chandrasekar, happens to see them both in the bedroom. Ambalavanan creates chaos in his house over this incident, but his sons and daughters say that it's normal for a boy and girl to consult about studies. Ambalavanan then decides never to interfere in things without analysing the details. Meanwhile Ambalavanan gets his settlement amount of a lakh and forty thousand rupees. Chandrasekar advises him to use it for himself, and not to trust his children. However Ambalavanan lets his wife decide what to do with the money. After coming to know about the money, Ambalavanan's sons Tamilarasan, Ilango, his eldest daughter and her husband, all eye to get a piece of the money. His daughter and her husband ask forty thousand to start a business. Tamilarasan says its difficult to travel to work to Pondicherry from Marakkanam, and asks one lakh so he can build his own house in Pondicherry. Ilango asks that they sell the house in Marakkanam, so that he can use the money to build his own house in Dindivanam where he works. Ambalavanan and Kamatchi innocently agree to this plan, and decide to live one week in Pondicherry and one week in Dindivanam alternately with their two sons.

While Uma continues to care for her family, Chandrasekar and Nirmal continue to ignore her. After Chandrasekar gets drunk at a local Friends Club, and falls sick, Uma nurses him back to health. Some days later Guru and Uma spot Nirmal and Valarmathi at a theatre. After this incident, Nirmal apologises to Uma and accepts her as his sister-in-law. Meanwhile Ambalavanan realises the true nature of his children once he moves to their house. He and Kamatchi are treated in a disrespectful manner by his sons and daughter-in-laws on many occasions. In Ilango's house, their private room is given to Ilango's father-in-law who is sick. The two sons do not give the five hundred rupees that they promised to give their dad every month, in return for his help in building the house. Ambalavanan and Kamatchi are thereby left without any money on their own, and depending on their disrespectful sons for survival. Meanwhile there are other problems that happen. Ilango's father-in-law is having an affair with the servant maid at Ilango's house, and even though Ambalavanan and Kamatchi see this, Ambalavanan tells her that he is not going to interfere in this, as he had already had a bad experience with Nirmal and Valarmathi studying math in the past. Ambalavanan's daughter and her husband end up using the forty thousand to buy a diamond necklace for themselves, rather than start a business. Ilango gets an alliance for Valarmathi and tries to get her married to a thirty eight year old father of two children, which Ambalavanan and Kamatchi disagree to.

Eventually the children decide to split the parents with father in one house and the mother in another house. This angers Ambalavanan and he leaves taking Kamatchi and Valarmathi with him, back to Marakkanam, and rents a small house to live in. Meanwhile Uma and Guru move out of Chandrasekar's house, and tell him that they will return only when he reforms and respects them as son and daughter-in-law. Amidst all these problems, Nirmal and Valarmathi secretly get married. Valarmathi explains her decision to her parents, and tells them that she and Nirmal will take care of them whenever and wherever possible. Both Ambalavanan and Kamatchi accept Valarmathi's decision, and wish the young couple well. Nirmal tells his father that he too is moving out of the house, and takes Valarmathi and goes to live in his brother's house for some time, until he can find a job. Later Chandrasekar comes and apologises to his sons and Uma, and asks all of them to come home. Uma finally manages to turn the family into a beautiful and ideal home filled with love.

Ambalavanan decides to file a case against his sons and son-in-law for cheating him off his money. His sons, daughter and son-in-law all visit Kamatchi and ask her to talk to their father and change his mind. Kamatchi later tells Ambalavanan that she will commit suicide if he doesn't withdraw the case, as she doesn't want her children to suffer. But Ambalavanan is stubborn. Finally Ambalavanan changes his mind withdraws the case. When Ambalavanan comes home after withdrawing the case, he finds Kamatchi dead as she has eaten Arali seeds and killed herself, because she thought that Ambalavanan will not withdraw the case. During the funeral, Ambalavanan doesn't talk to anybody and doesn't want see his wife's body. When Chandrasekar asks him to do his duties at the funeral, Ambalavanan says that he doesn't consider the dead woman his "wife", but rather only the "mother" of a few children. He says that Kamatchi did not care even a bit when their children left him on the street as a pauper and a bitter old man after ripping him off his money, but just the imaginary thought of a "court case" against her children, made her commit suicide even without thinking about Ambalavanan's possible lonely life after her death. He says that Kamatchi the "wife" died long back, the day she became Kamatchi the "mother".

The movie's climax shows that while the rest of them are carrying Kamatchi's body away, Ambalavanan walks off alone, and goes back to his old office King Sea Foods, and asks his manager if he has any job for him.

== Cast ==
- Visu as Ambalavanan
- Annapoorna as Kamatchi
- Rekha as Uma
- Vidhyashree as Valarmathi
- Kishmu as Chandrasekar
- Ilavarasan as Tamilarasan
- J. Lalitha as Tamilarasan's wife
- Ravi Raghavendra as Ilango
- Kokila Prabhakaran as Ambalavanan's eldest daughter
- Achamillai Gopi as Ambalavanan's son-in-law
- Guru as Chandrasekar's elder son
- Sakthi Kumar as Nirmal, Chandrasekar's younger son
- Pyramid Natarajan as Manager, King Sea Foods
- Omakuchi Narasimhan as Ilango's father-in-law

== Soundtrack ==
The soundtrack was composed by Shankar–Ganesh.

All lyrics are written by Idhayachandran.

Track listing
| No. | Title | Singer(s) | Length |
|---|---|---|---|
| 1. | "Santhoshame Ullasame" | Vani Jairam | 4:33 |
| 2. | "Thanneeril Thaladum" | K. J. Yesudas | 4:33 |
| 3. | "Pondatti Oru Paadhi" | Malaysia Vasudevan | 4:05 |
| Total length: | | | 13:11 |
