= Ayaal =

- Poster
- Directed by: Suresh Unnithan
- Written by: K. Ampady
- Produced by: Madhusoodanan Mavelikara; M. T. Dileep Kumar
- Starring: Lal; Lena; Ineya; Lakshmi Sarma; Sukumari
- Cinematography: Sujith Vasudev
- Edited by: Sobin K Soman
- Music by: Mohan Sitara; Somashekharan Unnitan; MG Anil
- Production companies: Seashell Movies; Elements Vision
- Distributed by: Seashell Movies Release
- Release date: 28 June 2013
- Country: India
- Language: Malayalam

Ayaal is a 2013 Indian Malayalam-language film directed by Suresh Unnithan. Lal, Lena, Ineya and Lakshmi Sharma play the lead roles. K. Ampady wrote the story, screenplay and dialogue. The film is produced by Madhusoodanan Mavelikara (Seashell Movies) and M. T. Dileep Kumar (Elements Vision). The cinematography is by Sujith Vasudev. Ayaal was earlier titled Nagabandham. The film was released on 28 June 2013.

Ayaal is a story of intense human relations. The story asks if love is the flowering of one's own heart, can it have a direction or is it Scalar (directionless). This is an uncomfortable question raised by the protagonist, Guru Dasan. The film problematizes the conventional fabric of human relations, its rules and its sanctity.

== Plot ==
Set in the late 1950s, the film uses the symbols of Serpentine Worship and socio-political rebellions during the period to create an ambiance for storytelling. The protagonist Dasan is a practicing Pulluvan, who has an aura of ascribed divinity around him. He has two wives, Janaki and Chakara. Janaki's love with Dasan is platonic, but Chakara true to her name is possessive. Dasan over time becomes passionate with Devaki Antharjanam, the wife of the village landlord as well. Be it wine, women, or smoke, Dasan has no restrictions. His mastery over the profession was unparalleled. Due to the ascribed divinity around him, he is unquestioned. But not for too long. Something happens which makes his life topsy-turvy! The event also brings out the tenacity and quality of relations he had. The film depicts the various shades of love and problematizes the conventional concepts around it. It is also an attempt to transcend the definitions of love and to explore the flowering of bonds which are more deep-rooted than love. What do we call it?

== Cast ==
- Lal as Gurudasan
- Lena as Devaki Antharjanam
- Ineya as Chakara
- Lakshmi Sharma as Janaki
- V. Venu as Pravarthiyar Thirumeni
- Master Dhananjayan as Ananthan
- Kalasala Babu as Vaasu Kaniyar
- Sukumari
- Indrans
- Mamukkoya
- Chembil Ashokan
- K. P. A. C. Lalitha
- Seema G. Nair
- Nisha Sarang
- Sreekala V K
- Rajeev Parameshwar

== Awards ==
- 2013 : Kerala Film Critics Association Awards - Second Best film
- 2013 : Kerala Film Critics Association Awards - Best Editor- Sobin K Soman
- 2013 : Lal - Kerala State Film Award for Best Actor
- 2013 : Suresh Unnithan - Kerala State Film Award – Special Mention
- 2013 : Sujith Vaasudev - Kerala State Film Award for Best Cinematography
- 2013 : Sreeja Ravi - Kerala State Film Award for Best Dubbing Artist

== Music ==
The music was done by Mohan Sitara, Somashekharan Unnitan, and MG Anil. The songs are sung by Jayachandran, Shweta Mohan, Vijay Yesudas and Anuradha Sriram. The film has five songs. The lyrics were by Devadas (famous for Kattukurinju poovum kondu) and MT Pradeep Kumar.
