= Thekkekkara Superfast =

- Directed by: Thaha
- Written by: Rajan Kiriyath-Vinu Kiriyath (dialogue)
- Screenplay by: Renji Kottayam
- Story by: Thaha
- Produced by: P P Sathish kumar
- Starring: Mukesh; Jagathy Sreekumar; Dileep; Gayathri Shastri; Prakash Raj
- Cinematography: Prathapan
- Edited by: E M Madhavan
- Music by: Ouseppachan
- Distributed by: Vinodh Movies
- Release date: 10 April 2004
- Country: India
- Language: Malayalam

Thekkekkara Superfast is a 2004 Indian Malayalam film. It was filmed in 1995, but got released only in April 2004 along with another delayed film Agninakshathram around Vishu.

== Cast ==
- Mukesh as Ulahannan
- Dileep as Benny Pookkattuparambil
- Gayatri Shastri as Sophia
- Jagathy Sreekumar as Ahamedkutty
- Rajan P. Dev as Philippose Pookkattuparambil
- Prakash Raj as Johnykutty, The main antagonist
- Bobby Kottarakkara as Thamban
- C. I. Paul as Paulachan
- KPAC Lalitha as Ammachi
- Rizabawa as Antappan
- Elias Babu as Thommikunju
- Harishree Ashokan as Bhairavan
- Kalamandalam Geethanandan

== Soundtrack ==
This film includes seven songs written by lyricist Gireesh Puthenchery. The songs were composed by the music maestro Ouseppachan.

Track	Song	Singers	Lyricist	Raga
1	"Konchum Maine"	Rajesh H.	Gireesh Puthenchery	
2	"Konchum Maine"	Sujatha Mohan	Gireesh Puthenchery	
3	"Manjadikkuru"	Madhu Balakrishnan	Gireesh Puthenchery	Kapi
4	"Mukkootti Mantharam"	Madhu Balakrishnan	Gireesh Puthenchery	Abheri
5	"Murali Kayyilenthi"	Sreenivas	Gireesh Puthenchery	
6	"Thalirambal"	M. G. Sreekumar, K. S. Chithra	Gireesh Puthenchery	
7	"Varasooryan"	G. Venugopal	Gireesh Puthenchery	
