= Jaathakam =

- Directed by: Suresh Unnithan
- Written by: Lohithadas
- Starring: Madhu; Sukumaran; Jayaram; Sithara; Shari; Thilakan; Innocent; Jagathy Sreekumar; Kaviyoor Ponnamma
- Cinematography: K.G. Vijayan
- Edited by: B.Lenin; V.T Vijayan
- Music by: R. Somashekharan
- Release date: 1989
- Country: India
- Language: Malayalam

Jaathakam (transl. Horoscope) is a 1989 Indian Malayalam film, directed by Suresh Unnithan and written by Lohithadas.The film stars Jayaram, Sithara, Shari, Thilakan, Madhu, Sukumaran, Innocent, Jagathy sreekumar and Kaviyoor ponnamma in the lead roles. The film has musical score by R. Somashekharan.

== Plot summary ==
Madhavanunni, aka Unni is a young widower who lost his wife even before the celebration of their 1st wedding anniversary. Unni's wife, Shyama, died in an accident. Unni's parents Appukuttan Nair and Janaki Amma have a blind belief in astrology since the death of their elder son. Unni also starts to believe in astrology after the death of his beloved wife Shyama. Unni did not believed in astrology earlier. So, he married Shyama, the girl whom he loved, at a registrar office against the wishes of his parents, with help of his friends and bride's family. After the marriage, Unni's parents reluctantly welcomed the newly wedded couple to their ancestral house. When Unni's parents checked the compatibility between the star signs of Unni and Shyama, they understood that the duo was not at all compatible. Shyama's horoscope had kuja dosha, which would cause early death to her husband. The family did many pujas to save the life of Unni. What really happened was the death of Shyama. She accidentally fell into a well near the kavu (a place where serpents are worshipped). The sudden death of Shyama makes Unni depressed. Unni's parents want him to get married again. But, he prefers to live with memories of his wife Shyama.

A peppy-chirpy girl named Malini, aka Malu comes to the village where Unni and his parents live. Malini's father is a retired professor who is a free thinker. He does not believe in astrology. Malini and her family visit Unni's house. Unni's father and Malini's father are childhood friends, just like Unni and Malini. When Unni sees Malini playing with his scooter, he scolds her. She gets angry. She decides to get him married again. Her futile as well as playful efforts to befriend Unni, crosses all the limits, when she accidentally breaks the photo of Shyama, which infuriates Unni. Unni slaps Malini in rage and pushes her to the door. Her head hits the door and she gets injured. Later, Unni feels guilty and apologises to Malini. Unni's parents like Malini. So, they secretly get the horoscope of Malini with the aid of their family astrologer and check whether it matches with the horoscope of their son. Horoscopes of Unni and Malini match very well. So, Unni's father tells Malini's father about his wish to get Malini as his daughter in law. Malu's father gives consent for the marriage of Unni and Malini by ignoring the protest raised by his elder son and his daughter-in-law. Unni and Malini get married with blessings of their family. They enjoy marital bliss during the 1st few months of their marriage. Malini gets pregnant which adds more happiness to their married life.

Unni's parents decided to see horoscope for the child to be born and astrologer says that child will not have a long life. So he suggested a few remedies, one of them is that Malini has to wear a sacred rope on her waist. When Unni brings it and asks Malini to tie that rope, she playfully says to Unni that her horoscope (Jaathakam) given prior to the wedding may not be accurate. The Unni's family verifies and finds out that Malini's horoscope doesn't match with Unni's. Then, they try to dissolve the marriage - by mentally torturing Malini and tearing apart Unni between his family and his wife in the process. But, Malini is adamant. She is not ready to give up.

Malini's brother, an army officer comes in and tries to take control of the situation. It is then that the story takes a complete twist leading to a fast-paced later half. Malini's brother and Unni have a fight when he sees Unni performing funeral rituals for Malini, who is still alive. Malini goes to her paternal home with her brother. Unni's father makes a tantric perform black magic to kill Malini. Malini's brother catches Appukuttan Nair's loyal servant red-handed while performing black magic.

Malini's brother forcefully brings Unni to the police station where he finds his father's loyal servant. His father's servant confesses to Unni that he witnessed Unni's father killing Shyama to save Unni's life. Unni is shocked to hear this. When Unni asks his father whether what he heard is true or not, his fathers nods. Unni blames his father for ruining his life. When Unni arrives with police to arrest his father, what he sees, is his father's dead body. Appukuttan Nair had committed suicide out of guilt. In the end, Unni and Malini are re-united because Unni's blind faith in astrology is collapsed.

== Cast ==
- Jayaram as Madhavanunni (or Unni)
- Madhu as Ramachandran Menon (Malini's father)
- Sukumaran as Somasekharan Menon (Malini's brother)
- Shari as Shyamala née Shyama (Unni's 1st wife)
- Thilakan as Appukuttan Nair (Unni's father)
- Kaviyoor Ponnamma as Janaki (Unni's mother)
- Sithara as Malini (or Malu)
- Jagathy Sreekumar as Narayana Panikkar (Family Astrologer)
- Innocent as Kunjiraman (Appukuttan Nair's servant)
- Shammi Thilakan as Chendakkaran
- Premji as Vaidyan
