= Aacharyan =

1993 film directed by Ashokan

- Directed by: Ashokan
- Starring: Thilakan; Suresh Gopi; Sreenivasan
- Cinematography: Prathapan C R
- Edited by: G Venkitaraman
- Music by: Ouseppachan; Lyrics: Bichu Thirumala
- Release date: 1993
- Country: India
- Language: Malayalam

Aacharyan is a 1993 Indian Malayalam film, directed by Ashokan and starring Thilakan, Suresh Gopi and Sreenivasan in the lead roles. The story is about an investigative journalist who tracks down a drug trafficking gang with the help of a retired civil servant and an ex-police officer.

== Plot ==
Sivashankaran, a journalist, goes in search of the truth regarding the death of Jeevan Kumar, a college student. He is determined to bring the criminals to justice.

== Cast ==
- Thilakan as Krishna Menon IAS
- Suresh Gopi as DySP Azad
- Sreenivasan as Journalist Shivashanker or Shiva
- Jagathy Sreekumar as Chief Reporter Prabhakaran or Prabhu
- Janardhanan as Raveedranath
- Vineeth as Abraham or Ebru
- Shari as Sumithra Shivashanker
- Rajeev Nanayankar as Unni
- Yashoda Wimaladharma as Rekha Raveedranath
- Cleetus Mendis as Abdulla Koya
- Mahesh as Jevankumar
- K. P. A. C. Azeez as Hamsa, Azad's father
- Prathapachandran
- K. P. Ummer as Alaxander Priest
- Kollam Thulasi as Chief Minister Sukumaran

== Soundtrack ==
The music was composed by Ouseppachan and the lyrics were written by Bichu Thirumala.

No.	Song	Singers	Lyrics	Length (m:ss)
1	"Chaayam Poya"	K.S.Chithra	Bichu Thirumala	
