= Kanikanum Neram =

1987 film by Rajasenan

- Directed by: Rajasenan
- Written by: Joseph Vattoli; Rajasenan (dialogues)
- Screenplay by: Rajasenan
- Produced by: Augustine Prakash
- Starring: Sunitha; Nedumudi Venu; Ratheesh; Saritha; Vineeth
- Cinematography: N. Karthikeyan
- Edited by: G. Murali
- Music by: Songs: A. T. Ummer; Background score: S. P. Venkatesh
- Production company: Super Productions
- Distributed by: Super Productions
- Release date: 14 April 1987
- Country: India
- Language: Malayalam

Kanikanum Neram is a 1987 Indian Malayalam-language film, directed by Rajasenan and produced by Augustine Prakash. The film stars Sunitha, Nedumudi Venu, Ratheesh and Saritha. The film has musical score by S. P. Venkatesh and songs composed by A. T. Ummer.

== Cast ==
- Sunitha as Indu
- Nedumudi Venu as Sethu
- Ratheesh as Raghu
- Saritha as Savithri
- Vineeth as Vinu
- Sadiq as Nandhu
- Vincent as Balagopalan
- KPAC Sunny as Parambil Keshavan
- Oduvil Unnikrishnan as Mathukutty
- Aranmula Ponnamma as Muthassi
- Alex Mathew as Shivan
- Jose Prakash as Parameshwan Menon
- Mafia Sasi as Gunda

== Soundtrack ==
The music was composed by A. T. Ummer and the lyrics were written by P. Bhaskaran.

No.	Song	Singers	Lyrics	Length (m:ss)
1	"Nunakkuzhikkavilil"	K. J. Yesudas	P. Bhaskaran	
2	"Vaasantha Chandrikayo"	K. S. Chithra	P. Bhaskaran	
