= Aardram =

- Directed by: Suresh Unnithan
- Produced by: Anil Placheril
- Starring: Murali, Sunitha; Urvashi; Jagathy Sreekumar; Kalpana
- Release date: 1992
- Country: India
- Language: Malayalam

Aardram is a 1992 Indian Malayalam film, directed by Suresh Unnithan, starring Murali, Sunitha and Urvashi in the lead roles.

== Cast ==
- Murali as Uppan Raghavan
- Sunitha as Sainaba
- Urvasi as Mary
- Sukumari as Mother Catherine
- Kalpana as Jaanu
- Jagathy Sreekumar as Vettichira Dimon
- Indrans as Damodharan
- M. G. Soman as Janardhana Kaimal
- N. L. Balakrishnan as Sainaba's brother
- Narendra Prasad as Vamadevan
- Vijayaraghavan as Madhavankutty
- Adoor Bhavani as Karthi
- Rajan P. Dev as Mathayichan
- Poojappura Radhakrishnan as Murugappan
- Santhosh as Moideen
- Shivaji as Padmanabhan
- Kollam Ajith as Pandiyan
- Ganesh Kumar as Abdu
- Zainuddin as Sathyasheelan
- Bobby Kottarakkara as Teastall owner
- Kollam Thulasi as Sainaba's brother
- M. R. Gopakumar as Musliar
