= Agninakshathram (2004 film) =

- Directed by: Karim
- Written by: S. N. Swamy
- Produced by: Shantha V. Nathan
- Starring: Suresh Gopi; Biju Menon; Siddique; Jagathy Sreekumar
- Cinematography: Ramachandra Babu
- Edited by: K.Rajagopal
- Music by: Raveendran; S. P. Venkatesh (Background Score)
- Release date: 14 April 2004
- Country: India
- Language: Malayalam

Agninakshathram is a 2004 Indian Malayalam-language fantasy action film directed by Karim and produced by Shantha V. Nathan. The film stars Suresh Gopi, Biju Menon, Siddique And Jagathy Sreekumar in lead roles. The film had background score by S. P. Venkatesh and songs by Raveendran.

== Plot ==
The story revolves around a Brahmin mansion, Thirumangalam Kovilakam, in which its members are tortured over decades by black magicians for acquiring a sacred idol to gain supernatural powers.

The elder one, Valyachan saves the family with his prayers and prudence every time. Following the marriage of an atheist member, Aniyan Thampuran, a girl was born to him who has supernatural abilities. Believed to be an incarnation of Goddess, people from far and wide started visiting the girl for help. Chudala the disciple of black magicians, decides to enter the mansion in disguise to understand the girl's abilities and bring the mansion to the ground. His plans are foiled by the elder one. As an answer to his prayers, a saviour reaches the mansion as Thalakkulathoor Nambi an incarnation of Lord Aditya (the sun God), in disguise as a Kalari master. The crux of story involves the fight between good and evil.

== Cast ==
- Suresh Gopi as Thalakkulathur Nambi
  - Lord Adithya
- Biju Menon as Aniyan
- Sidduique as Chudala
  - Maanaappan
- Indraja as Ammu
- Jagathy Sreekumar as Jayanthan
- Sai Kumar as Swami
- Bindu Panicker as Sathi
- Aishwarya as Aswathi Warrier
- Baby Sanika as Rudra
- Nassar as Baba
- Kalabhavan Santhosh as Kutty Narayanan
- Ravi Menon as Doctor Ananthan
- Kannur Sreelatha as Panchali
- Madambu Kunjukuttan as Valyachan

== Release ==
The film had a delayed release along with another delayed film Thekkekkara Superfast on Vishu.
