= Kaliveedu =

- Directed by: Sibi Malayil
- Written by: Sasidharan Arattuvazhi
- Produced by: Dinesh Panicker
- Starring: Jayaram; Manju Warrier; Sunitha; Vani Viswanath; Jagadish; Kottayam Santha
- Cinematography: Anandakuttan
- Edited by: Bhoominathan
- Music by: Mohan Sitara
- Release date: 19 December 1996
- Country: India
- Language: Malayalam

Kaliveedu (transl. Play House) is a 1996 Malayalam family drama film directed by Sibi Malayil. It stars Jayaram, Manju Warrier, Jagadish, Sunitha, and Vani Viswanath in lead roles. The film explores the marital relationship of Mahesh (Jayaram) and Mridula (Manju Warrier), and their lives following their divorce.

== Plot ==
Mahesh is an architect/interior designer working for a reputed company. Ulahannan is his friend and a site supervisor in the same company. Ulahannan, Dr. Gonzales, and Mahesh are good friends. Yamini is a modern girl from the USA who wishes to settle down in Kerala and approaches Mahesh to design her house. Upon her father's insistence, Yamini wishes to marry Mahesh but is surprised to know that Mahesh is already married to a dancer named Mridula.

Mahesh reveals that he was very disciplined due to his upbringing in a military family. He used to regularly exercise, wake up early, read newspapers, and keep his house/clothes clean. He wanted a wife who was disciplined, would be proactive in looking after her husband's needs, and would advise in his job-related designs. However, Mridula fails to meet his expectations. One day, a servant, Oormila, is hired. Oormila takes an active interest in Mahesh's activities and lives up to his expectations. Mahesh is highly impressed with Oormila. However, this annoys Mridula when she realises that Oormila is in fact Ulahannan's wife. Oormila was hired to make Mridula understand the responsibilities of a wife. An angry Mridula leaves the house after a heated argument, and they file for divorce.

After hearing his story, Yamini suggests to Mahesh that they live together for a few days (without any physical relationship) and if they find each other compatible they would get married. Mahesh agrees to the suggestion. Mahesh soon realises that Yamini is not a match for him and Mridula was in fact a better life partner. On the other hand, Yamini is very happy and is convinced to marry Mahesh. Seeing her happiness, Mahesh reluctantly agrees to the marriage.

At the marriage registrar's office, Mahesh is surprised to see Mridula. Yamini explains that for any happy married life, each partner must adjust to the other, know each other's shortcomings, and never be over-disciplined. Yamini informs Mahesh to remarry Mridula since they both love each other. Finally, Mridula and Mahesh get married again.

== Cast ==
- Jayaram as Mahesh Sivan
- Manju Warrier as Mridula
- Vani Viswanath as Yamini Menon
- Jagadish as Ulahannan
- Sunitha as Oormila
- Innocent as Chittedathu Madhavan Nair
- Cochin Haneefa as Dr. Gonzales
- Jagannatha Varma as Menon
- Kalpana as Mary
- Santhakumari as Treesa
- Ponnamma Babu as Ramani
- Kottayam Santha
- Anandavally
