= Kaveri (1986 film) =

- Directed by: Rajeevnath
- Written by: Rajeevnath; Nedumudi Venu (dialogues)
- Screenplay by: Nedumudi Venu; Rajeevnath
- Starring: Mammootty; Mohanlal; Adoor Bhasi; Nedumudi Venu; Premji
- Cinematography: Madhu Ambat
- Edited by: Ravi
- Music by: V. Dakshinamoorthy; Ilaiyaraaja
- Production company: Dakshineswari Films
- Distributed by: Dakshineswari Films
- Release date: 23 May 1986
- Running time: 130 min.
- Country: India
- Language: Malayalam

Kaveri is a 1986 Indian Malayalam-language film, directed by Rajeevnath. The film stars Mammootty, Mohanlal, Adoor Bhasi, and Nedumudi Venu. The film has musical score by V. Dakshinamoorthy and Ilaiyaraaja.

== Plot ==
Kaveri is a family film of love and sacrifice.

== Cast ==
- Mammootty
- Mohanlal
- Adoor Bhasi
- Nedumudi Venu
- Premji
- Sithara

== Soundtrack ==
The music was composed by V. Dakshinamoorthy and Ilaiyaraaja and the lyrics were written by Kavalam Narayana Panicker.

No.	Song	Singers	Lyrics	Length (m:ss)
1	"Heramba"	V. Dakshinamoorthy, Chorus, Eeswari Panicker	Kavalam Narayana Panicker	
2	"Janmangal"	M. Balamuralikrishna, Eeswari Panicker	Kavalam Narayana Panicker	
3	"Neelalohitha"	M. Balamuralikrishna	Kavalam Narayana Panicker	
4	"Oru Veena Than"	M. Balamuralikrishna, Eeswari Panicker	Kavalam Narayana Panicker	
5	"Swarnasandhya"	M. Balamuralikrishna	Kavalam Narayana Panicker	
