= Saandram =

1990 film directed by Thaha

- Directed by: Thaha; Ashokan
- Written by: Thaha; Ashokan
- Screenplay by: Thaha; Ashokan
- Produced by: Thaha; Ashokan
- Starring: Suresh Gopi; Parvathy; Innocent; Captain Raju
- Cinematography: Saloo George
- Edited by: G. Venkittaraman
- Music by: Johnson
- Production company: Enjoy Films
- Distributed by: Enjoy Films
- Release date: 5 October 1990
- Country: India
- Language: Malayalam

Saandram (സാന്ദ്രം, Lit. Dense) is a 1990 Indian Malayalam psychological thriller film, directed and produced by Thaha and Ashokan. It stars Suresh Gopi, Parvathy, Innocent, and Captain Raju in the lead roles. The film has a musical score by Johnson.

== Plot ==
The Poulose family which comes to Ooty on vacation, befriends a newly married couple, Sreeraman and Indulekha, staying next door on their honeymoon. The couple looks happy on the outside, but the wife has problems underneath the surface.

When the local Circle Inspector makes a visit, it is revealed that a psychopath Unni is after Indulekha's life. Unni was Indulekha's ex-lover who had been comatose for over a year and a half after a fatal accident with no hope of recovery. Her parents had forced her into a reluctant marriage with Sreeraman. However, Unni made a miraculous recovery but with a mental imbalance which leaves him with no sense of time. He is deluded into thinking that he was hospitalized only for a few days and Indu had married betraying him. He also believes that his accident was her doing, making him go for her life now.

In the end, after a huge fight with Sreeraman, Unni is shot dead by Poulose just before he almost stabs Indulekha.

== Cast ==
- Suresh Gopi as Sreeraman
- Parvathy as Indulekha Sreeraman
- Innocent as Poulose Anammottil
- Kalpana as Anna Poulose
- Kuthiravattam Pappu as Caesar
- Master Badusha as Ukkru Poulose
- Master Twinku as Kariya Poulose
- Praseetha as Sofiya Poulose
- N. L. Balakrishnan as Balakrishnan
- Mamukkoya as Abdu/Abdulla
- Sai Kumar as Unnikrishnan
- Jagadish as Markosekutty
- Captain Raju as Circle Inspector Hari
- Ranjini – Cameo Appearance as the Circle Inspector's partner

== Soundtrack ==
The music was composed by Johnson, and the lyrics were written by Kaithapram.

No.	Song	Singers	Lyrics	Length (m:ss)
1	"Kaithappoo Ponpodi Thooviya"	K. S. Chithra	Kaithapram	
2	"Kandallo"	Innocent	Kaithapram	
3	"Ponnithaloram"	G. Venugopal, Chorus	Kaithapram	
