= Savidham =

- Directed by: George Kithu
- Written by: John Paul
- Screenplay by: John Paul
- Produced by: Babu Thiruvalla
- Starring: Nedumudi Venu; Shanthi Krishna; Sunitha; Maathu
- Cinematography: Ramachandra Babu
- Edited by: K. R. Bose
- Music by: Johnson
- Distributed by: Symphony Creations
- Release date: 1992
- Country: India
- Language: Malayalam

Savidham is a 1992 Indian Malayalam film, directed by George Kithu, starring Nedumudi Venu, Shanthi Krishna, Sunitha and Maathu in the lead roles.

== Plot ==
Ramavarma Thampuran a.k.a. Ramji is a prominent music director in the Malayalam film industry, whose talents are in high demand. He spends his time composing songs at his sprawling lakefront home. His wife Sudha Thampuratty is a homemaker, and is supportive of her husband's career. The couple also encourage their daughter Neelima to explore her interests in sports and fashion, much to the chagrin of Thampuran's old aunt who lives with them. Though Thampuratty is a musician and an accomplished Veena-player herself, she has kept music from her family due to a tragedy in her past. She stopped playing music since she lost her fiancé Sethumadhavan Nair to a tragic accident 17 years ago. She was forced to give up her five-day-old daughter to be raised by a good friend and a nun in an orphanage due to the social stigma associated with conceiving a child out of wedlock.

Reena arrives at Sudha's home one day, eager to get to know the mother who had to give her up as a baby. Sudha introduces Reena as a friend's daughter, and everyone in the household accept her with typical Indian hospitality. When Ramji happens to hear Reena sing one night, he is so captivated by her voice that he decides to give her an opportunity to sing in his latest film. Her songs become chartbusters, and turn Reena, (now known by her stage name Meera)into an instant celebrity. Neelima feels jealous about all the attention Reena gets not only from her parents, but also from Neelima's fiancé Sivadasa Menon. Neelima feels displaced in her own home and stumbles upon a few letters between Sudha and her friend about Reena. She shares it with her father, who is devastated and refuses to talk to Sudha for many hours. Neelima lashes out at her mother in her hurt and anger, and refuses to be in the same room with Sudha. Ramji's old aunt tells him to focus on the good years of his married life and overlook the tragedy in his wife's past. She wisely tells him that it could happen to Neelima one day, and urges him to think from a father's perspective as well.

Ramji has a change of heart and goes to reconcile with his wife, only to find her dead in their bedroom. Unable to suffer through the rejection from her husband and daughter, Sudha committed suicide. After her funeral, Reena is ready to leave the house forever, when Ramji entreats her to stay back. He accepts her as a daughter, and Neelima embraces her elder sister.

== Cast ==
- Shanthi Krishna as Sudha Thamburatty
- Sunitha as Neelima
- Maathu as Reena / Meera
- Nedumudi Venu as Ramavarma Thampuran
- Kaithapram as Sreenivasan
- Ashokan as Shivadasa Menon
- Shari as Tessi
- Aranmula Ponnamma as Cheriyamma
- Mamukkoya as Balakrishnan
- Suresh Gopi – as Sethumadhavan Nair – Flashback story lover of Sudha Thampuratty (Guest appearance)
- Jose Pellissery as a film producer
- Kozhikode Narayanan Nair as Father of Sudha Thampuratty

== Soundtrack ==
- "Poonthennale" - KS Chithra, Chorus Kaithapram
- "Brahmakamalam" - KJ Yesudas Kaithapram
- "Mounasarovara" - KS Chithra
- "Thoovaanam" - MG Sreekumar, Sujatha Mohan
- "Mounasarovara (Bit)" - KJ Yesudas
- "Mounasarovara (Bit Duet)" - KJ Yesudas, KS Chithra

== Awards ==
Kerala State Film Awards 1992

- Best Play Back Female Singer – K. S. Chithra ("Mounasarovaram song".)
- Second Best Actress – Shanthi krishna
