= Nettippattom =

- Directed by: Kaladharan
- Written by: Sasidharan Arattuvazhi
- Produced by: Balagopalan Thampi
- Starring: Sreenivasan; Rekha; Sukumari; Jagathy Sreekumar; Manoj K. Jayan; K. P. A. C. Lalitha; Jagadish
- Cinematography: Saloo George
- Music by: Johnson
- Release date: 1991
- Country: India
- Language: Malayalam

Nettippattom is a 1991 Indian Malayalam-language comedy drama film directed by Kaladharan and produced by Balagopalan Thampi. The film starred Sreenivasan, Rekha, Sukumari, Jagathy Sreekumar, Manoj K. Jayan, K. P. A. C. Lalitha, Vijayaraghavan, Oduvil Unnikrishnan, Jagadish and Kumbalathu Padmakumar. The film's musical scored by Johnson.

== Plot ==
Peethambaran is an educated man who is involved in the problems of his village. He does not look after his family. He is both partially fooled by the villagers and his friends for their own good. While doing charity, he meets Indu. Later, he contests in local elections by compulsion of his friends, in which he loses. He also loses his property deeds to a friend who cheated. Meanwhile, Indu's family proposes a boy from their family to Peethambaran's sister. They also proposed to marry Indu to Peethambaran as they belong to an aristocratic family, though now in poor financial conditions. He gets married. In the end, he tries to change for Indu and denies helping his friend Jacob, whose sister was cheated, to avenge an act of Peethambaran and friends to shut down a ration shop. However, Indu, as a working woman, wants him not to sacrifice his identify while not keeping her waiting forever for him.

== Cast ==
- Sreenivasan as Peethambaran
- Rekha as Indu
- Jagadish as Jacob
- Jagathy Sreekumar as Uthaman Pillai
- Manoj K. Jayan as Freddy
- K. P. A. C. Lalitha as Peethambaran's mother
- Nedumudi Venu as Kumaran
- Sukumari as Jacob's Mother
- Sankaradi as Achuthan Nair
- James as Devan
- Krishnankutty Nair as Ganeshan, Indu's Father
- Kumbalathu Padmakumar as Postman
- Beena Antony as Sandhya
- Bobby Kottarakkara as Dhamu aka Madantha
- Oduvil Unnikrishnan as Avarachan
- Kothuku Nanappan as Harindran, Peethambaran's uncle
- Poojappura Ravi as Police Sub Inspector Sathyan
- Vijayaraghavan as Sugunan
- T. P. Madhavan
- Adinad Sasi as Shanthappan
- Sandra Thomas
- Sabnam

== Soundtrack ==
The music was composed by Johnson and the lyrics were written by Bichu Thirumala.

No.	Song	Singers	Lyrics	Length (m:ss)
1	"Chothikozhunne"	K. S. Chithra, Balagopalan Thampi, Chorus	Bichu Thirumala	
2	"Hariyum Sreeyum"	Balagopalan Thampi	Bichu Thirumala	
