= Sathyaprathinja =

- Directed by: Suresh Unnithan
- Written by: S. L. Puram Sadanandan
- Produced by: A. K. K. Bappu
- Starring: Murali; Suresh Gopi; Jagathi Sreekumar; Geetha; Kundara Johny; Sai Kumar
- Cinematography: Sunny Joseph
- Edited by: G. Murali
- Music by: Mohan Sithara
- Production company: Arakkal Films
- Distributed by: Arakkal Films
- Release date: 1992
- Country: India
- Language: Malayalam

Sathyaprathinja is a 1992 Malayalam film directed by Suresh Unnithan. Murali, Suresh Gopi, Jagathi Sreekumar and Geetha did the major roles in the film. The movie was produced by A. K. K. Bappu under the banner of Arakkal Films which was distributed by Arakkal Films as well. The movie was scripted by S. L. Puram Sadanandan.

== Plot ==
A state's chief minister faces various anti-social forces and fights them courageously. However, he encounters a sinister politician who tries to belittle the former's efforts.

== Cast ==
- Murali as Achuthan
- Suresh Gopi as Sreedharan
- Urvashi as Sreekutty
- Vijayaraghavan as Gopan
- Jagathi Sreekumar
- Geetha
- Kundara Johny
- Adoor Bhavani as Sreedharan's Mother
- Sukumari as Achuthan's Mother
- Saikumar
