= Varnam (1989 film) =

- Poster
- Directed by: Ashokan
- Written by: Ashokan
- Produced by: Priyanka
- Starring: Jayaram; Suresh Gopi
- Cinematography: Saloo George
- Edited by: G. Venkataraman
- Music by: Ouseppachan
- Production company: Priyanka Films
- Distributed by: K. R. G. Enterprises
- Release date: 1989
- Country: India
- Language: Malayalam

Varnam (English: Colour) is a 1989 Malayalam-language psychological drama film starting Jayaram and Suresh Gopi. As the directorial debut of film director Ashokan, the film received critical acclaim and was well received.

== Plot ==
Haridas moves to the city after his twin sister's death. Still struggling to keep his past, he meets and falls in love with Ammu, the daughter of Major M.K. Nair. He learns that a local politician has cheated him out of a job with Manu, his classmate from college, and also suspects he killed his sister.

== Cast ==
- Jayaram as Haridas
- Suresh Gopi as Manu Vishwanath
- Ranjini as Ammu
- Thilakan as Major M. K. Nair
- Meena as Major's Wife
- Jagathi Sreekumar as Venkidy
- Parvathy Jayaram as Revathy
- Innocent as Varadan Pillai
- M. G. Soman as Manu's Brother
- Usha as Ammu's Friend
- Krishnan Kutty Nair as K. Purushothaman
- N. L. Balakrishnan as Unni
- Mukesh as Gopan (cameo appearance)
- Mamukkoya as himself (cameo appearance)

== Trivia ==
Though a tragedy at the end, this film contains many comedy sequences that the audience have taken to heart, involving Jagathi Sreekumar and N. L. Balakrishnan. Deserving special mention is the one in which Mamukkoya who plays himself is thought to be dead by Haridas and Venkidy and entrusted to be buried clandestinely by the ruffian Varadan Pillai, who gets the shock of his life when Mamukkoya comes to his senses and walks aways at the last moment.

== Soundtrack ==
All songs are written by K. Jayakumar.

- "Dala Marmaram (female)" - KS Chithra, Chorus
- "Olavaalan" - MG Sreekumar
- "Neru Neru" - CO Anto, Krishnachandran
- "Dala Marmaram (male)" - MG Sreekumar
- "Kripaya Paalaya" - MG Sreekumar
