= Mookilla Rajyathu =

- Directed by: Ashokan-Thaha
- Written by: B. Jayachandran
- Produced by: Rohini Arts
- Starring: Mukesh; Thilakan; Jagathy Sreekumar; Siddique
- Edited by: G. Venkitaraman
- Music by: Ouseppachan
- Production company: Rohini Arts
- Distributed by: Rohini Arts
- Release date: 1991
- Country: India
- Language: Malayalam

Mookilla Rajyathu (transl. In the country of the noseless) is a 1991 Indian Malayalam-language slapstick comedy film directed by the Ashokan-Thaha duo and written by B. Jayachandran. It stars Mukesh, Thilakan, Jagathy Sreekumar, Siddique, and Vinaya Prasad. The film features music composed by Ouseppachan. The plot revolves around four patients escaped from a mental asylum and the troubles they cause in their attempts to start a new life in a sane society. Thilakan's performance was widely appreciated and it is considered one of his best performances in a comical role.

The film is widely regarded as one of the greatest comedy films in Malayalam cinema. Over time, it has attained a significant cult following. Its dialogues and scenes continue to be widely referenced, memed, and parodied in Malayalam popular culture.

== Plot ==
The film starts by displaying an antic of Keshavan who is an inmate of the Kakkanad Mental Hospital. Two other inmates are Benny and Krishnankutty. By profession Benny is a painter, Krishnankutty is an auto-mechanic and Keshavan has retired from military service. The trio chance to come across a newspaper report that the Bollywood film star Amitabh Bachchan is visiting Ernakulam city for a film shooting, which is close to where they stay. They are soon joined by a new inmate Venu, who takes him to the mental hospital. Venu is a good singer but suffers from a compulsive obsession for music. All the four share a passion for Amitabh Bachchan.

Driven by a desire to see Amitabh Bachchan the four manage to escape from the mental hospital that night by outsmarting the cell warden Ameen. They reach Ernakulam city in a bus but are disappointed to learn that Amitabh Bachchan had gone back after the film shooting which was a month ago and that they had in fact seen an old newspaper report. When they wake up the next morning, they find Venu missing. They go searching for him alone. Benny meets his former college mate and lover Leena in the city. Keshavan goes to a politician's rally and undresses in support of the Swadeshi movement, only to be saved by Benny. Krishnankutty drinks at a bar, but finds that he does not have money to pay for it, and is assaulted. Finally, they find Venu having found employment as a singer, and he is chased by Balan, his older brother and Ameen. They decide to live by finding suitable employments. They find shelter in a rented house owned by a young dance teacher, whom Leena mistakes as Benny's new lover. Benny becomes a painter, Krishnankutty a mechanic, and Keshavan a security guard. Leena's father is unwilling to give his daughter in marriage to Benny because of his insanity, and even unsuccessfully hires a goonda Bheem Singh to assault him.

Two conmen Vasu and Abdullah who use the pseudonyms Sundaran Pillai and Gireesh Puri, are in the disguise of a TV serial producer and director, respectively. Their intention is to rob a bank near the house rented by the four by making a tunnel through their house while they are busy. They hire the four under the pretext of their TV serial and send them to learn various skills like martial arts, rock climbing, tree climbing and break dance among other things. They manage to keep them away from the house during daytime while the excavation is going on under the supervision of another gang member Bruno.

However, a police officer is tracking their activities. In the end, their vicious scheme is busted up by the police officer, assisted by the four who wake up to the reality. The bank robbers end up in police custody.

== Cast ==
- Mukesh as Benny
- Thilakan as Keshavan / Keshu
- Jagathy Sreekumar as Krishnan
- Siddique as Venu
- Vinaya Prasad as Leena
- Paravoor Bharathan as Oomen, father of Leena
- Kuthiravattam Pappu as Vasu / Sundaran Pillai
- Rajan P. Dev as Abdullah
- Suchitra Murali as House Owner / Dance Teacher
- Jagadish as Santhosh, the Police Inspector
- Mala Aravindan as Ameen
- N. L. Balakrishnan as Balan
- Kunchan as Bruno
- Krishnan Kutty Nair as Bheem Singh
- Philomina as Insane Lady
- Oduvil Unnikrishnan as Dr. V. N. Sharma
- Hakim Rawther as Charlie, inmate at mental hospital

== Music ==
Mookkilla Rajyathu

Soundtrack album by Ouseppachan
- Released: 1991
- Studio: A.V.M RR
- Genre: Feature film soundtrack
- Length: 11:52
- Language: Malayalam
- Label: Millennium Audios
- Producer: Ouseppachan

Ouseppachan chronology
| Pookkalam Varavayi (1991) | Mookkilla Rajyathu (1991) | Aayushkalam (1992) |

The soundtrack was composed by Ouseppachan. It features three songs which were sung by M. G. Sreekumar and K. S. Chithra. The lyrics were written by Kaithapram Damodaran and Poovachal Khader.

Track listing
| No. | Title | Lyrics | Singer(s) | Length |
|---|---|---|---|---|
| 1. | "Kaashithumbakkavay" | Kaithapram Damodaran | M. G. Sreekumar | 4:09 |
| 2. | "Varnam Vaarichoodum" | Poovachal Khader | K. S. Chithra | 4:11 |
| 3. | "Break Break Dance" | Kaithapram Damodaran | K. S. Chithra | 3:32 |
| Total length: | | | | 11:52 |

== See also ==
- Krazzy 4, a 2008 Indian Hindi-language remake
