= Chavettu Pada =

- Directed by: Sekhar
- Starring: Radhika Sarathkumar; Saikumar
- Music by: S. P. Venkatesh
- Production company: Renuka Films
- Distributed by: Renuka Films
- Release date: 1991
- Country: India
- Language: Malayalam

Chavettu Pada is a 1991 Indian Malayalam film, directed by Sekhar. The film had musical score by S. P. Venkatesh.

== Cast ==
- Radhika Sarathkumar
- Saikumar
- Balan K Nair
- Jagathy Sreekumar
- Janardhanan
