= Georgootty C/O Georgootty =

- VCD cover
- Directed by: Haridas Kesavan
- Written by: Ranjith
- Story by: Girish Puthenchery
- Produced by: Chandragiri Productions
- Starring: Jayaram; Sunitha; Thilakan
- Cinematography: Sekhar V. Joseph
- Edited by: G. Murali
- Music by: Mohan Sithara
- Production company: Chandragiri Productions
- Release date: 11 April 1991
- Country: India
- Language: Malayalam

Georgootty C/O Georgootty is a 1991 Indian Malayalam-language romantic comedy-drama film starring Jayaram, Sunitha, and Thilakan in major roles. It was directed by Haridas and written by Ranjith. The film was produced under the banner of Chandragiri Productions. It was Haridas' directorial debut. Haridas won the Kerala State Film Award for Best New Face Director for this film. The music was composed by Mohan Sithara with lyrics by Gireesh Puthenchery.

== Plot ==
George Kutty is a senior engineering student. His family, once rich, is now struggling financially after going through a drawn-out legal issue. He has three younger sisters.

Ittichen is a rich but miserly, cruel and uncultured landlord. His daughter Alice lives in the world of novels that are serialized in weekly magazines. To save George's family from hardship, Chandy, the marriage broker, brings Alice together with George Kutty. He lies to Ittichen about the wealth and status of George's family. Ittichen learns the truth very late and vents his anger on George. Despite being a brilliant student with excellent job prospect, George is forced to stay at his in-laws' house doing menial jobs. He accepts his fate since he also was a part of the initial fraud. When it becomes too much for him to bear, he changes his approach and decides to take on his father-in-law.

With the help of his old friend, a police Inspector in the area and other friends, he teaches Ittichen a lesson. Also, he saves Ittichen's life from a local bully. Ittichen accepts George not only as his son-in-law but also as his own son. Once denied the right to go outside, George and Alice set off with Ittichen's blessings.

== Cast ==
- Jayaram as George Kutty
- Sunitha as Alice, George Kutty's Wife
- Thilakan as Cheerankandathu Ittichan, Alice's Father
- K. P. A. C. Lalitha as Elamma, Alice's Mother
- Jagathy Sreekumar as Broker Chandykkunju / Chandy
- Siddique as SI Iqbal, George Kutty's Friend
- Jagadish as Cheerankandathu Anto, George Kutty's Friend and Ittichan's Nephew
- Kuthiravattam Pappu as Paulose, George Kutty's Friend
- Vinod Kozhikode as Paily, Ittichen's Henchman
- Rizabawa as Prakash, George Kutty's Friend
- Babu Namboothiri as Ouseppachan, George Kutty's Father
- Sukumari as George Kutty's Mother
- Oduvil Unnikrishnan as Kunjeria, Maria's Husband
- Unnimary as Maria, Kunjeria's Wife & Alice's Aunt
- Janardhanan as Kaattiparamban Kunjumaani
- Vijayaraghavan as Pappachan, Ittichan's Ex-Henchman
- Mala Aravindan as Drama Artist / Fake Income Tax Officer
- Murali Menon as Sugathan
- Sudhakaran as Peelipose, Politician
- Abu Salim as Kunjumaani's Henchman
- Ragini as Prostitute
- Pradeep Kumar as Kunjumaani's Henchman
