= Neelagiri (film) =

1991 Indian Malayalam film directed by I. V. Sasi

- Promotional poster
- Directed by: I. V. Sasi
- Written by: Ranjith
- Produced by: K.R.G.
- Starring: Mammootty; Madhoo; Sunitha; M. G. Soman; Srividya; Karan; Anju
- Cinematography: Ramachandra Babu
- Edited by: K. Narayanan
- Music by: M. M. Keeravani
- Distributed by: K.R.G. Movies International
- Release date: 30 November 1991
- Running time: 146 minutes
- Country: India
- Language: Malayalam

Neelagiri (English: The Blue Mountain) is a 1991 Malayalam film directed by I. V. Sasi and written by Ranjith, starring Mammootty, Madhoo, Sunitha, M. G. Soman, Anju and Srividya. The music was composed by M. M. Keeravani, credited as Maragathamani. The film was a box-office hit.

== Cast ==
- Mammootty as Sivankutty Menon
- Madhoo as Anitha/Ani Mol
- Sunitha as Lakshmi
- Raghu as Muthu
- Anju as Usha
- Raja as Kannan, Usha's Husband
- M. G. Soman as Shekhara Menon
- Srividya as Radha menon aka Radhamma
- Shivaji as Kanaran, Ani's father
- Sangeeta as Nithya, Ani's mother
- Bhushan Kumar Dhar as Rankan
- Shanavas as Sekhar
- Kuthiravattam Pappu as Arumukhan
- Aloor Elsy as Lathika, Arumughan's Wife
- Augustine as Rajappan
- Jagannatha Varma as CI Harindra Varma
- Mala Aravindan as Chackochan
- Bheeman Raghu as Chandru
- Manu Varma as Arun
- Adoor Pankajam as Muthiyamma

== Soundtrack ==
The film's soundtrack was composed by M. M. Keeravani, with lyrics by P. K. Gopi.

#	Song	Singers
1	Karukanaambum	K. S. Chithra, Chorus
2	Kilipaadumetho	K. S. Chithra, Chorus
3	Kilipadumetho	K. J. Yesudas, Chorus
4	Manjuveena	K. J. Yesudas, Sujatha Mohan
5	Mele Maanathe Theru	K. J. Yesudas
6	Ponnarali	M. G. Sreekumar, K. S. Chithra
7	Thumbi Nin	K. S. Chithra
