= Kollam Thulasi =

Indian actor

- Born: S. Thulasidharan Nair; May 29, 1949 (age 77); Kanjavely, Kollam
- Occupations: Actor, Ret. Govt. Deputy Secretary
- Years active: 1979–present
- Political party: Bharatiya Janata Party
- Parent(s): Sastri P. S. Nair (Father), Bharathi Amma (Mother)

Kanjaveli Kuttilazhikathu Thulasidharan Nair, (born 29 May 1949) better known by his stage name Kollam Thulasi, is an actor in Malayalam cinema. His first appearance was in the 1985 film Mukhyamantri. He is well known for his unique acting style. He appeared in many television serials. He is also a poet and a politician.

== Personal life ==
He was born in 1949 to Kanjaveli Kuttilazhikathu P. S. Nair and Bharathi Amma. He obtained a master's degree in History and subsequently earned a diploma in Journalism.

In 1970, he joined the Kerala Government Service at the Kozhikode Corporation. During his career in the Municipal Service, he held various administrative positions and retired as Deputy Secretary from the Thiruvananthapuram Corporation. He currently resides at Valiyasala, Thiruvananthapuram. His daughter, V. T. Gayathri, is an engineer, and his son-in-law, Dr. Anoop Sinha, is a professor at a medical college.

== Filmography ==
=== Malayalam films ===
Year	Title	Role	Notes
1986	Ninnistham Ennishtam		
1986	Amme Bhagavathi		
1986	Yuvajanotsavam	Police Officer	
1987	Ezhuthapurangal	Judge	
1987	Bhoomiyile Rajakkanmar	Gopala Pillai	
1987	Theertham	Man at Bar	
1988	Oru CBI Diary Kurippu	Regional Medical Officer	
1988	August 1	Papachan	
1988	Moonnam Mura	Home Secretary	
1989	News	Doctor	
1989	Naduvazhikal	Gopala Pillai	
1989	Kireedam	Sub-Inspector Hari	
1989	Annakutty Kodambakkam Vilikkunnu	Dr. Harikrishnan	
1989	Kandathum Kettathum	Narayanan	
1989	Douthyam	Army Officer	
1989	Dasharatham	Advocate	
1989	Adikkurippu	District Collector	
1989	Jagratha	Medical Officer	
1989	Artham	Jaleel	
1989	Kaalalppada	Alex	
1989	Chanakyan	Anantharaman	
1990	Thalayana Manthram	Damodharan Kartha	
1990	Kottayam Kunjachan	Anthrose	
1990	Randam Varavu	Police Officer Aravindan	
1990	Ee Thanutha Veluppan Kalathu	Babu	
1991	God Father	Advocate	
1991	Souhrudam		
1991	Mukha Chithram		
1991	Inspector Balram	Home Minister	
1991	Post Box No. 27		
1991	Oru Prathyeka Ariyippu	Mohandas	
1991	Kilukkam	'Pichathi' Muthu	
1991	Kuttapathram	Adv. Narendran	
1992	Soorya Gayathri	College Principal	
1992	Sabarimalayil Thanka Sooryodayam	A C Menon	
1992	Ellarum Chollanu		
1992	Aardram	Sainaba's brother	
1992	Pandu Pandoru Rajakumari	Arumugham Vadivelan	
1993	Journalist	Kuriachan	
1993	Bhagyavan	Police Officer	
1993	Janam	Mathachan	
1993	Customs Diary	Rasheed	
1993	Aacharyan	Chief Minister	
1993	Bandhukkal Sathrukkal	Sugunan	
1993	Dhruvam	Chekutty MLA	
1994	Poochakkaru Mani Kettum	Gopika's Father	
1994	Chanakya Soothrangal		
1994	Chief Minister K. R. Gowthami	Sachithandan	
1994	Pidakkozhi Koovunna Noottandu		
1994	Vishnu	Abu	
1994	Commissioner	Home Minister	
1995	Thacholi Varghese Chekavar	Police Officer	
1995	The King	John Varghese	
1995	Thovaalappookkal		
1996	Hitlist	Minister	
1996	Rajaputhran	Advocate	
1996	Kaathil Oru Kinnaram	Padmanabhan Thampi	
1997	Asuravamsam	Medical College Professor	
1997	Lelam	Pappi	
1998	Kalaapam	Mammaali	
1998	The Truth	Anwar Ahmed	
1999	The Godman	Menon	
1999	Thachiledathu Chundan	Advocate	
2000	Rapid Action Force	Home Minister	
2000	Narasimham	Public Prosecutor	
2001	Nagaravadhu	Mathew Tharakan	
2001	Swathithampuraatti		
2002	Swarna Medal	Easwera Iyer	
2002	Chathurangam	Advocate	
2002	Jagapoga		
2003	Leader		
2004	Udayam		
2004	Sathyam	Police Officer	
2005	Pauran	Minister	
2005	The Tiger	Cheriyan Thundiyil IPS	
2006	Ravanan	P K Sukumaran	
2006	Pathaaka	Johny Xavier	
2006	Highway Police	Keeri Pappan	
2007	Janmam		
2007	Time	Chief Minister	
2007	Naadiya Kollappetta Rathri	Madhavan	
2007	Abraham & Lincoln	Damodharan	
2007	Gulmohar	DySP Sivan	
2007	De Ingottu Nokkiye		
2008	Kanichukulangarayil CBI	Adv. Rahim	
2008	Crazy Gopalan	SI Pushkaran	
2008	Aayudham	Port Minister Sudevan	
2008	Mohitham		
2009	Shudharil Shudhan	Fernandes	
2009	Oru Black and White Kudumbam	Police Officer	
2009	Chagathikoottam	Bhargavan	
2009	Black Dalia	Kariyachan	
2009	Orkkuka Vallappozhum		
2009	Angel John	Inspector	
2010	The Thriller	Home Minister Narayanan	
2010	Drona 2010	Vishahari	
2010	Again Kasargod Khader Bhai	Adv. Vinod Swaminathan	
2010	Brahmasthram	Advocate	
2010	Nirakazhcha		
2010	Oru Naal Varum		
2010	Kanmazha Peyyum Munpe	Usman	
2010	Njan Sanchaari		
2010	Sahasram		
2011	Sahapadi 1975		
2011	Teja Bhai & Family	Teja's fake father	
2011	Manushyamrugam	Jail SP Rasheed	
2011	Vellaripravinte Changathi		
2012	Padmasree Bharat Dr. Saroj Kumar	Union Leader	
2012	The King & the Commissioner		
2013	Progress Report	Chinnappa	
2013	Sound Thoma	Mahadevan	
2014	Ettekaal Second		
2014	Ring Master	Opponent Leader	
2014	Bhaiyya Bhaiyya	Home Minister	
2014	Mathai Kuzhappakkaranalla	Menon	
2015	Love Land		
2016	Aneesia		
2017	1971: Beyond Borders	Sahadevan's friend	
2018	Vallikkudilile Vellakkaran	Abhilash's father	
2022	Varaal		
2024	Kurukku		
2025	Mr Bengali The Real Hero	Padmanabhan	

=== Other language films ===
Year	Film	Role	Language	Notes
2002	Samurai	IAS Rajasekar	Tamil	
2004	Arul	Party Chief Sethupathi	Tamil	
2011	Police Veta		Telugu	

== Television ==
Year	Title	Channel	Role	Notes
2024-2025	Sukhamo Devi	Flowers TV	DGP Thomas	
2021	Ente Bharya	Flowers TV	Balan Menon	
2020	Koodathayi	Flowers TV	Police Officer	
2018	Parasparam	Asianet	Rishikesh	
2017	Aparichitha	Amrita TV		
2015	Dhathuputhri	Mazhavil Manorama	Minister	
2014–2015	Balaganapathy	Asianet	Kunjappu	
2011	Kanalpoovu	Jeevan TV		
2010–2012	Chakkarabharani	Surya TV		
2009	Vigraham	Asianet		
2009	Sreemahabhagavatham	Asianet	Bhairavan	
2008	Sreekrishnaleela	Asianet		
2008-2009	Hallo Kuttichathan 2	Asianet	SI	
2007-2009	Ente Manasaputhri	Asianet	Balabadran	
2007	Pavitra Jaililaanu	Asianet		
2006	Kanalppoovu	Kairali TV	Nainan	
2006	Sthree 2	Asianet		
	Anantham		Vadivel	
2004	Kadamattathu Kathanar	Asianet	Kollan/Neeli's Father	
2001	Sreeraman Sreedevi	Asianet		
