= Bhaagyavaan =

Bhagyavan
- Directed by: Suresh Unnithan
- Written by: C. Radhakrishnan
- Starring: Sreenivasan; Sithara
- Cinematography: Vipinmohan
- Edited by: G. Murali
- Music by: Johnson
- Release date: 1993
- Country: India
- Language: Malayalam

Bhagyavan (transl. The lucky man) is a 1993 Indian Malayalam-language drama film directed by Suresh Unnithan and written by C. Radhakrishnan, starring Sreenivasan and Sithara in lead roles.

== Plot ==
Balagoplan "Balu" is a post-graduate, but unemployed. He is active in local youth club while waiting for a job. He spends his time with friends Mathachan, Rahulan, Mammu and Jose rehearsing a drama for temple festival. His fiancé Ammu and mother are worried about his irresponsible nature.

The movie progresses with Balu and friends getting into trouble when their experimental drama attempt Peruchazhikale Ningalkku Oru Aalayam (A house for rats) fails midway during the temple festival. Meanwhile, Rahulan becomes a good friend of Meena, daughter of affluent politician Karunan Muthalali.

The story takes a turn when the local astrologer, Mulankattu Gurukkal examines Balu's horoscope and identifies that his horoscope has a special property called "Alabhya Labhya Shree". This means that his presence will bring luck to people around him while he himself will never be able to enjoy the luck.

Balu starts up a rubber plantation with a loan from the bank. During the inauguration, a treasure pot full of golden coins and ornaments is found from his land. But as per law government officials take over the treasure. This incident spread the news of Balu's "Alabhya Labhya Shree". Unni Pillai insists Balu to buy a lottery ticket for him. Unni Pillai wins Rs. 50000 in lottery draw.

The rest of the movie is Balu's struggle to stay sane when people around him compete for his luck.

== Cast ==
- Sreenivasan as Balu
- Sithara as Ammu
- Jagathy Sreekumar as Mathachan
- Premkumar as Jose
- Sainudeen as Mammu
- Vijayaraghavan as Rahulan
- Suchithra as Meena
- Adoor Bhavani as Devaki, Balu's mother
- Narendra Prasad as Divakaran Thekkumthara MLA
- Philomina as Ammu's mother
- Karamana Janardanan Nair as Mulankattu Gurukkal
- Mamukkoya as Unni Kurup, panchayat president
- Poojappura Radhakrishnan as Tea Shop Owner
- Oduvil Unnikrishnan as Vasudevan
- T. P. Madhavan as Watchman
- Kollam Thulasi
- Thesni Khan as Thankamani, drama artist

== Reception ==
A critic from The Times of India wrote that "'Bhagyavan' is a completely packed entertainer, with laughter, romance, emotions, and thrilling moments".
