= Neduveerppukal =

- Directed by: Suresh Heblicker
- Release date: 1991
- Country: India
- Language: Malayalam

Neduveerppukal is a 1991 Indian Malayalam film, directed by Suresh Heblicker.
