= Sithara (actress) =

Indian actress (born 1971)

- Born: Sithara Parameshwaran Nair; 30 June 1973 (age 53); Kilimanoor, Kerala, India
- Occupation: Actress
- Years active: 1986 – present

Sithara is an Indian actress known for her works predominantly in Malayalam, Tamil, Telugu, and Kannada films. She has appeared in over a hundred films in South Indian languages.

== Early life ==
Sithara was born as the eldest of the three children of Parameshwaran Nair and Valsala Nair in Kilimanoor. Her father Parameshwaran Nair was an engineer at the electricity board and her mother was also an officer at the electricity board. She has two younger brothers, Pratheesh and Abhilash. She studied in Lourdes Mount School, Vattappara. She was studying for pre-university certification at Sree Sankara Vidyapeetom College, Kilimanoor, when she acted in her debut movie Kaveri (1986).

== Personal life ==
Sithara never married, a decision she took early in her life after her father's death.

== Career ==
Sithara made her acting debut in 1986 with the Malayalam film Kaveri, directed by Rajeevnath. Her performance was well-received, and she soon became a sought-after actress in the Malayalam film industry. She went on a signing spree and turned to be most sought after actress of 80's and 90's in South India.

She then expanded her career to Tamil cinema with her debut in Pudhu Pudhu Arthangal (1989), directed by K. Balachander, which was a major success and established her as a prominent actress in Tamil films.

Throughout her career, Sithara has worked with several actors and directors. Some of her Malayalam films include Nakhakshathangal (1986), Mazhavilkavadi (1989), Jaathakam (1989), Dasharatham (1989), Amaram (1991), Chamayam (1993) and Guru (1997).

In Tamil cinema, she is known for her performances in films like Pudhu Vasantham (1990) and Padayappa (1999). She has to be part of more than 100 films in each south languages as heroin and character artists.

In late 2000, she took a break from the industry. Sithara made her comeback to Mollywood with Bharya Onnu Makkal Moonnu directed by Rajasenan. After her comeback, she acted in Bharya Onnu Makkal Moonnu (2013) and Saigal Padukayanu (2015).

She is also known for her work in Television. The serial likes Mouna Raagalu, Kavari Maangal, Parasakti, Eetharam Katha, Intinti Gruhalakshmi and Poova Thalaya.

== Filmography ==
Year	Title	Role	Language	Notes
1986	Kaveri	Kaveri	Malayalam	
1987	Oridathu	Rema	Malayalam	
1987	Ponnu	Ammu	Malayalam	
1988	Mukthi	Shobha	Malayalam	
1988	Aryan	Thatrikutty	Malayalam	
1988	Paadha Mudra	Sharadha	Malayalam	
1989	Naduvazhikal	Rema	Malayalam	
1989	Mazhavilkavadi	Amminikutty	Malayalam	
1989	Puthiya Karukkal	Sindu	Malayalam	
1989	Chanakyan	Geethu	Malayalam	
1989	Jaathakam	Malini	Malayalam	
1989	Pudhu Pudhu Arthangal	Jyothi	Tamil	
1990	Purappadu	Kunjumol	Malayalam	
1990	Vachanam	Maya	Malayalam	
1990	Maanmizhiyaal	Prasanna	Malayalam	
1990	Orukkam	Bhagi	Malayalam	
1990	Unnai Solli Kutramillai	Janaki	Tamil	
1990	Manaivi Vantha Neram	Latha	Tamil	
1990	Pudhu Pudhu Ragangal	Kanika	Tamil	
1990	Pudhu Vasantham	Gowri	Tamil	
1990	Puriyaadha Pudhir	Sindhu	Tamil	
1990	Oru Veedu Iru Vasal	Guest Appearance	Tamil	
1991	Teneteega	Amrutha	Telugu	
1991	Archana IAS	Archana	Tamil	
1991	Ezhunnallathu	Remani	Malayalam	
1991	Srivari Chindulu	Madhavi	Telugu	
1991	Paattondru Ketten	Sneha	Tamil	
1992	Kaaval Geetham	Priya	Tamil	
1992	Endrum Anbudan	Nandhini	Tamil	
1993	Maamiyar Veedu	Anandavalli	Tamil	
1993	Pettredutha Pillai	Kalyani	Tamil	
1993	Akka Chellelu		Telugu	
1993	Journalist	Ranjini Menon	Malayalam	
1993	Chamayam	Liza	Malayalam	
1994	Pondattiye Deivam	Parimala, Shyamala	Tamil	
1994	Bhagyavan	Ammu	Malayalam	
1994	Halunda Tavaru	Jyothi	Kannada	
1995	Karulina Kudi	Yashodha	Kannada	
1995	Kavya	Kalpana	Kannada	
1995	Bangarada Kalasha	Uma	Kannada	
1995	Deergha Sumangali	Gayathri	Kannada	
1995	Ganeshana Galate	Lakshmi	Kannada	
1995	Thai Thangai Paasam	Kalyaani	Tamil	
1996	Bangarada Mane	Megha	Kannada	
1997	Ganesha I Love You		Kannada	
1997	Guru	Vaidehi	Malayalam	
1997	Ammavra Ganda	Prenu	Kannada	
1997	Sangliyana Part 3	Kalpana	Kannada	
1998	Natpukaaga	Gowri	Tamil	
1999	Chinna Durai	Maragatham	Tamil	
1999	Padayappa	Nandhini	Tamil	
1999	Sneham Kosam	Gowri	Telugu	
1999	Panchapandavar	Yamuna	Malayalam	
2000	Thirunelveli	Varadappan's wife	Tamil	
2000	Mugavaree	Shantha	Tamil	
2000	Manu Needhi	Poongodi's mother	Tamil	
2001	Jenu Goodu	Sharada	Kannada	
2004	Samba	Samba's sister	Telugu	
2009	Bharya Onnu Makkal Moonnu	Lisamma	Malayalam	
2009	Vellathooval	Sheela	Malayalam	
2009	Josh	Sathya's mother	Telugu	
2010	Naanu Nanna Kanasu	Kalpana	Kannada	
2010	Brindavanam	Lakshmi	Telugu	
2010	Gudu Gudu Gunjam	Seeta	Telugu	
2012	Yamaho Yama	Yana' wife	Telugu	
2013	Black Butterfly	Indira	Malayalam	
2013	Mathapoo	Karthik's sister	Tamil	
2013	Om 3D	Jyothi	Telugu	
2014	Naa Rakumarudu	Bindu's mother	Telugu	
2014	Legend	Jaidev's younger sister	Telugu	
2014	Poojai	Ramaswamy's wife	Tamil	
2014	Chinnadana Nee Kosam	Nithin's Mother	Telugu	
2015	Srimanthudu	Charuseela's mother	Telugu	
2015	Bhale Bhale Magadivoy	Lucky's mother	Telugu	
2015	Mr. Airavata	Sita Devi	Kannada	
2015	Saigal Padukayanu	Sujatha	Malayalam	
2015	Sankarabharanam	Rajjo Devi	Telugu	
2016	Chakravyuha	Student's mother	Kannada	
2016	Janatha Garage	Bujji's Mother	Telugu	
2017	Sathamanam Bhavati	Sudha	Telugu	
2017	Munnodi	Sathya's mother	Tamil	
2017	Jaya Janaki Nayaka	Narayana's wife	Telugu	
2017	Oxygen	Raghupathi's wife	Telugu	
2017	2 Countries	Laya's Mother	Telugu	
2018	Brihaspathi	Sudhir's mother	Kannada	
2018	Rangula Ratnam	Vishnu's mother	Telugu	
2018	Nagesh Thiraiyarangam	Nagesh's mother	Tamil	
2018	Bharat Ane Nenu	Bharath's step mother	Telugu	
2018	Buckasura	Arya's mother	Kannada	
2018	Raju Gadu	Seeta	Telugu	
2018	Amma I Love You	Annapurna	Kannada	
2018	Srinivasa Kalyanam	Lakshmi	Telugu	
2018	Aravinda Sametha Veera Raghava	Varalakshmi	Telugu	
2018	Hello Guru Prema Kosame	Gayatri	Telugu	
2019	Mr. Majnu	Nikitha's mother	Telugu	
2019	Jodi	Vasavi	Telugu	
2022	Sammathame	Krishna's mother	Telugu	
2023	Ala Ila Ela	Janaki	Telugu	
2024	Hit List	Vijay's mother	Tamil	
2024	Oru Thee	Janaki	Tamil	
2025	Maareesan	Dr. Meenakshi Velayudham	Tamil	
2026	Theertharoopa Thandeyavarige	Janaki	Kannada	
2026	Sannidhanam P.O	Yasodha	Tamil	

== TV serials ==
List of Sithara Malayalam television serials credits
Year	Title	Role	Language	Channel	Notes
1998–2001	Ganga Yamuna Saraswati		Tamil	Raj TV	TV debut
1999	Sindhooram		Malayalam	Asianet	
2000	Parasparam		Malayalam	Surya TV	
2002	Sneha		Malayalam	Asianet	
2006	Eetharam		Malayalam		
2006	Summer in America	Meera	Malayalam	Kairali TV	
2008	Aarthi	Arathi	Tamil	Raj TV	
2008–2009	Thirumagal		Tamil	Kalaignar TV	
2010	Swathi Chinukulu	Tulsi	Telugu	ETV	
2012	Mouna Raagalu		Telugu	ETV	
2016	Kavari Maangal	Sandhya	Tamil	Jaya TV	
2017	Parasakti		Tamil	Vasanth TV	
2017	Eetharam Katha	Hema	Telugu	ETV	
2021-2022	Intinti Gruhalakshmi	Pravallika	Telugu	Star Maa	
2023–2024	Poova Thalaya	Rajeshwari	Tamil	Sun TV	
