= Orkkappurathu =

Orkkapurathu
- Poster
- Directed by: Kamal
- Screenplay by: Shibu Chakravarthy
- Story by: Ranjith
- Produced by: Mohanlal; Century Kochumon
- Starring: Mohanlal; Ramya Krishnan; Nedumudi Venu; Paravoor Bharathan
- Cinematography: Vipin Mohan
- Edited by: K. Narayanan
- Music by: Ouseppachan
- Production company: Cheers Films
- Distributed by: Century Release
- Release date: 13 April 1988
- Country: India
- Language: Malayalam

Orkkappurathu (transl. Offhand) is a 1988 Indian Malayalam-language comedy drama film directed by Kamal and written by Shibu Chakravarthy from a story by Ranjith. It is produced by Mohanlal and Century Kochumon, starring Mohanlal, Nedumudi Venu, N. L. Balakrishnan, Ramya Krishnan, Thilakan and K. P. Ummer in the lead roles. The film score was composed by Ouseppachan, the film does not contain any songs other than the Irish ballad "Danny Boy". The film set in an Anglo-Indian background was filmed entirely in and around Fort Kochi, Kerala, India. Orkkappurathu released on 13 April 1988 was a commercial success. This movie ran more than 150 days. The film has grossed around 1.5 crore.

== Plot ==
Freddy and his father Nicholas belong to a brokers and commission agents group. They stay on the first floor of the house. The house owner and his wife stay on the ground floor, and since Freddy and Nicholas have not paid rent for the past few months, they are being asked to move out of the house. Freddy threatens the house owner whenever he comes and asks them to move out. Nicholas owns a fishing boat in the name of Martha, who was his wife. Owing to financial debts, they had to pledge this boat to Avaran, who is a money lender. Whenever they get a deal, they will give a share to Avaran as interest, then go to Mamma's bar, take liquor and return to tease Avaran before going to bed. Nicholas also goes to see the boat tied to the Jetty near Avaran's business place.

To have a glance, they used to pick up newspaper issued to their House Owner's house. One day they saw about an advertisement for old model car to be sold, which was put by Sherin's mother. The duo take the car and repair it to good condition, and sell it to a person who is fond of collecting old items - Mundakkal Sivarama Menon, after mimicking that the car had enough demand from another person. In this process, Nicholas steals an old sword from Menon's house. While returning in the night, their bullet motorcycle was hit by a car; which they follow and get the repair compensation charges from JJ's men, who were in that car. JJ was impressed with them. After few days, they bring the sword to Menon's house for sale; and escapes off when Menon calls police and informs that the lost sword has been found. Later, they ought to see another advertisement about a piano to be sold by the same lady. The piano was gifted to Sherin by her father Williams on one of her birthdays and she is very fond of it. She was not willing to part with it, but owing to financial necessities, they had to get it sold. Freddy and Nicholas take the piano to their home. They go to different places to find a buyer for that piano. They agree to give it for a film.

However, the film producer tells them that the film script got changed at a later point, so the music instrument used by the film hero was changed from piano to violin; and so he cannot purchase it now. Symphony Music CEO says that they have enough pianos in their warehouse, and so he doesn't need it. By the way, Freddy and Nicholas pass JJ's house and so they approach JJ to buy the piano. JJ rejects the piano. At last they play a trick and sell the piano to one of JJ's business associate. JJ discovers that his associate was cheated, and being aware of how clever the duo were, he plans a task for them. Avaran says that he will sell their boat Martha if they fail to pay 50,000 Rupees inclusive of principal and interest. JJ calls Freddy and Nicholas and offers 50,000 as reward to kidnap Chacha, who was once his partner in business. After much thought, the duo agrees to kidnap Chacha, and succeeds in doing so.

However, Chacha is rescued by his men before they reach the destination. JJ takes Nicholas into custody and asks Freddy to kidnap Chacha, after which Nicholas will be relieved. With the help of one of Nicholas' friends, Appaji, they rescue Nicholas. They get confused as both Chacha and JJ visit Sherin's house and asks for the piano, which they had already sold. Freddy and Nicholas guess that there is some hidden truth within the piano, and they trace the piano from a Library from where it was sold to. They get some location maps hidden in the piano. Meanwhile, Chacha and JJ also find the piano, but by that time the maps were missing from it. Both Nicholas and Freddy were taken into custody by JJ and Chacha, and they were beaten up to provide the maps. They give up the maps, and both JJ and Chacha go with their men to get the treasure.

Freddy retrieves the treasure from a well with the help of Nicholas and Apaji. After getting the treasure, the trio tries to leave the palace. As they leave, JJ, Chacha and their gangs confront them and a huge fight takes place. Finally Freddy, Nicholas and Apaji handles them to the cops and they get rewarded for the treasure retrieval. The trio gets back their boat and celebrates with Sherin. The movie ends with the boat going away.

== Cast ==
- Mohanlal as Freddy Nicholas
- Nedumudi Venu as Nicholas
- Thilakan as James Joseph alias J. J.
- K. P. Ummer as Muhammed Ibrahim Settu also known as Chacha
- N. L. Balakrishnan as Appaji
- Ramya Krishna as Sherin
- Paravoor Bharathan as Mundakkal Sivarama Menon
- Innocent as Avaran
- Valsala Menon as Sherin's mother
- Sukumari as Mamma
- Sankaradi as House owner
- Kunchan as Symphony Music CEO
- C. I. Paul as Police Inspector
- Jagadish as Film producer
- Kollam Ajith as Chacha's Henchman
- Vinod Kozhikode as Chacha's Henchman
- Thalapathy Dinesh as Chacha's Henchman
- Ponnambalam as Chacha's Henchman
- Ramaraju as J J Mansion's Henchman

== Production ==
Producer Century Kochumon was planning to produce a film to release on Vishu 1988. He signed Shibu Chakravarthy and Ranjith as the screenwriter and story-writer, respectively. Mohanlal was the protagonist. Kamal was signed to direct the film only later. Vipin Mohan was the cinematographer. Director Priyadarshan contributed a twist in the film, when the writers were unable to produce a turn in the second half of the story, Mohanlal told the plot to his friend Priyadarshan, who suggested him to hide the treasure map inside the piano in the story-line.

== Soundtrack ==
The film score was composed by Ouseppachan. The film does not feature any song, except the Irish ballad "Danny Boy" written by Frederic Weatherly.
