= N. L. Balakrishnan =

Indian film still photographer and actor

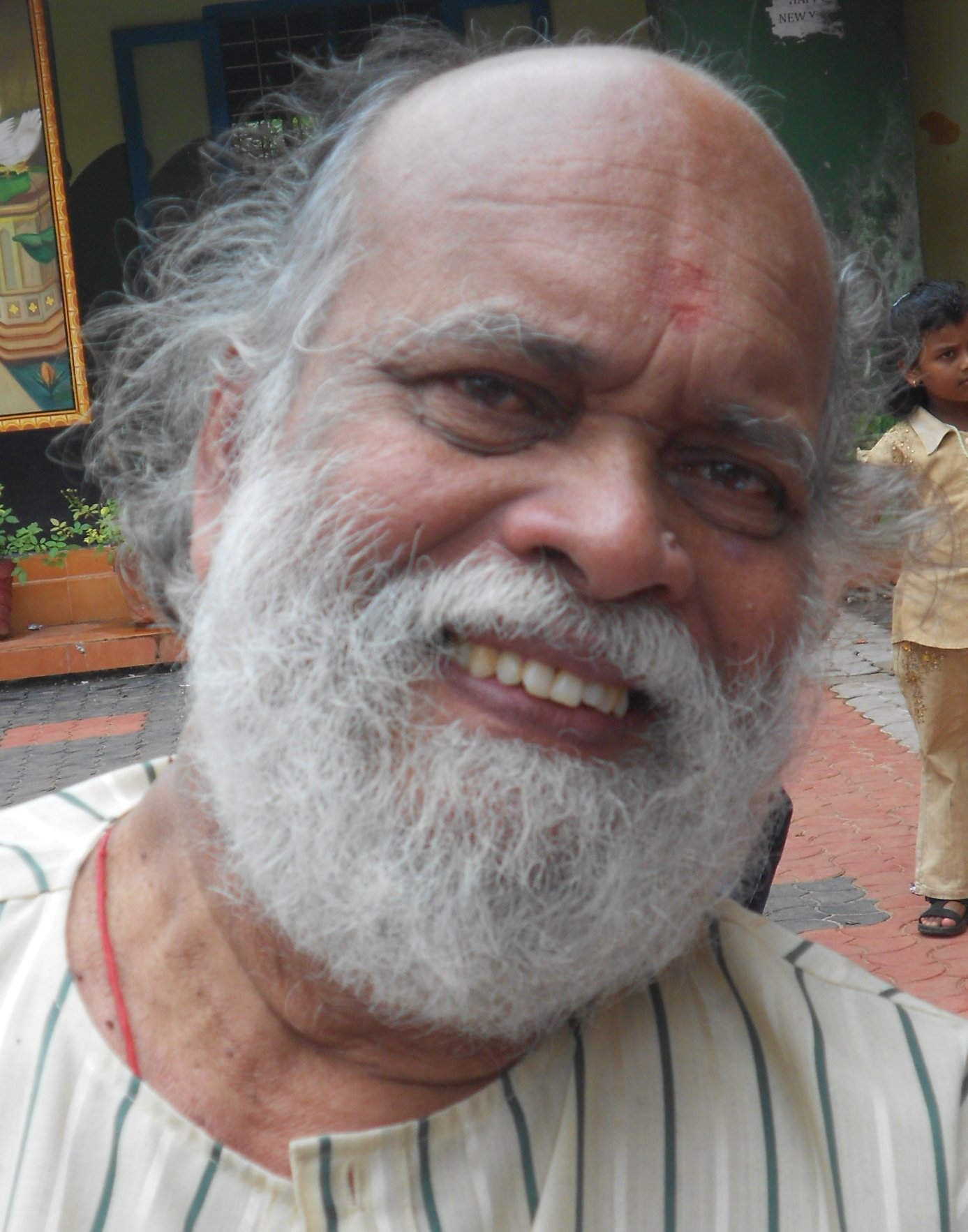
- Born: N.L. Velayudhan; 17 April 1942; Powdikonam, Trivandrum, Travancore
- Died: 25 December 2014 (aged 72); Thiruvananthapuram, Kerala, India
- Occupations: Unit still photographer; actor; photojournalist
- Years active: 1967–2014

Narayanan Lakshmi Balakrishnan (born Velayudhan) (17 April 1942 – 25 December 2014), commonly known as N. L. Balakrishnan, was an Indian film still photographer and actor who worked in Malayalam cinema. He worked as a still photographer in about 170 films and has associated with great directors including G. Aravindan, John Abraham, Adoor Gopalakrishnan, P. Padmarajan, Bharathan and K. G. George. He was an actor, with 180 credits to his name, and has also worked as a photo journalist with Kerala Kaumudi.

== Biography ==
=== Early life ===
N. L. Balakrishnan hailed from Powdikonam near Chempazhanthy in Thiruvananthapuram. He was born as the only child of Narayanan and Lakshmi on April 17, 1942. He obtained a diploma in painting from College of Fine Arts Trivandrum and trained in photography from various studios in Trivandrum including Metro Studio, Sivan Studio and Rupalekha Studio. K. Neelakanta Pillai of Rupalekha Studio introduced Balakrishnan to film producer Sobhana Parameswaran Nair who made him work as a still photographer in the super hit film Kallichellamma (1967).

=== Photography ===
Balakrishnan is best known for his work as unit still photographer in the films of master director G. Aravindan. He worked with Aravindan in 11 films including Kanchana Sita, Pokkuveyil, Chidambaram and Vasthuhara. Balakrishnan worked with Adoor Gopalakrishnan in five films: Prathisandhi (documentary film conceived for UNICEF), Swayamvaram, Kodiyettam, Mukhamukham and Elippathayam. He was also part of numerous other parallel films of the 1970s and 1980s. He worked with other directors including John Abraham, K. P. Kumaran, Lenin Rajendran, P. Padmarajan, Bharathan and K. G. George as well as with commercial movie-makers such as Sathyan Anthikad. With Padmarajan, Balakrishnan associated in eight films including Peruvazhiyambalam, Oridathoru Phayalvaan, Novemberinte Nashtam, Innale and Namukku Parkkan Munthiri Thoppukal. Bhadran's Spadikam (1995) was the last film he worked as a still photographer.

Balakrishnan worked as a still photographer in about 170 films. He was the first to take still pictures while the film was being shot. The practice till then was to pose after the scenes were shot by the movie camera. Veteran photographer R. Gopalakrishnan says: "He [Balakrishnan] was also the first one to take a picture without using the flash, and that made his stills natural. He also showed that better pictures could be taken using the 35mm camera, instead of the 120mm, which had been in vogue earlier." According to noted film critic C. S. Venkiteswaran, Balakrishnan was much more than a photographer; he was a "historian in a photographer's garb." Venkiteswaran says: "He [Balakrishnan] travelled with the most important filmmakers of Malayalam, captured their moods, the moments during the making of films and also the cultural and social ambience of the periods in which these films were made."

=== Acting ===
Balakrishnan's first film was Rajiv Anchal's Ammanam Kili. Anchal says, "I had known him since the days of working with Aravindan for Oridath. When I turned an independent director with a children's film Ammanam Kili, I decided to cast him as a gypsy who sold birds. It was a main role in the film and he did a fine job."

As an actor, Balakrishnan had around 180 films to his credit. He is known for his work on films such as Orkkapurathu (1988), Joker (2000), Kakkothikkavile Appooppan Thaadikal (1988) and Pattanapravesham (1988). Filmmakers used his bulky physique to comic effect. In many films he played the giant with a heart of a child. His last film Daivathinte Swantham Cleetus released in 2013 September.

=== Personal life ===
He worked as a photojournalist in Kerala Kaumudi for eleven years (1968–1979). He was also the head of Forum for Better Spirit, a pro-drinking group formed with the aim of lobbying for subsidised and abundant supply of good liquor in Kerala. Balakrishnan has published a book titled Black and White (2011).

During his final days, Balakrishnan was in a bad condition with serious medical problems like diabetes, hypertension, high cholesterol and heart disease. In 2014 November he was diagnosed with cancer and underwent treatment in Government Medical College, Thiruvananthapuram. He died there at 11 PM on Christmas Day in 2014, aged 72. He was cremated on the premises of his home nearby the next day. He is survived by his wife Nalini and only son Rajan.

== Awards ==
- 2012: Kerala Film Critics Association Awards – Chalachithra Prathiba award
- 2014: Special Award by Kerala Lalithakala Akademi

== Filmography ==
=== As an actor ===
1. Daivathinte Swantham Cleetus (2013)
2. Kanyaka Talkies (2013)
3. Isaac Newton Son of Philippose (2013)
4. Bhoopadathil Illatha Oridam (2012)
5. Da Thadiya (2012)
6. My Dear Kuttichathan - 3D (2011)
7. Ninnishtam Ennishtam 2 (2011)
8. Shikkar (2010)
9. Kandahar (2010)
10. Aayiram Varnangal (2009)
11. Bhoomi Malayalam (2009)
12. 2 Harihar Nagar (2009)
13. The Mother Earth (2009)
14. Pakal Nakshatrangal (2008)
15. Thirakkatha (2008)
16. Robo (2008)
17. Anthiponvettam (2008)
18. Hareendran Oru Nishkalankan (2007)
19. Inspector Garud (2007)
20. Athisayan (2007)
21. Made in USA (2005)
22. Thalamelam (2003)
23. Joker (2000)
24. The Gang (2000)
25. James Bond (1999)
26. Kudumbakodathi (1996)
27. Vrudhanmare Sookshikkuka (1995)
28. Spadikam (1995)
29. Three Men Army (1995)
30. Manathe Kottaram (1994)
31. Aayirappara (1993)
32. Kavadiyattam (1993)
33. Ulsavamelam (1992)
34. Manyanmar (1992)
35. Ente Ponnu Thampuran (1992)
36. Chanchattam (1991)
37. Malootty (1991)
38. Mookilla Rajyathu (1991)
39. Aparaahnam (1991)
40. Mukha Chithram (1991)
41. Inale (1991)
42. Vasthuhara (1991)
43. Kallanum Policum (1991)
44. Kouthukavaarthakal (1990)
45. Nanma Niranjavan Sreenivasan (1990)
46. Dr. Pasupathy (1990)
47. Saandram (1990)
48. Varnam (1989)
49. David David Mr. David (1988)
50. Pattanapravesham (1988)
51. Kakkothikkavile Appooppan Thaadikal (1988)
52. Orkkappurathu (1988)
53. Ammaanamkili (1986)
54. Aravam (1980)

=== As a still photographer ===
- Spadikam 1995
- Mayamayooram
- Malootty 1992
- Vadakkunokkiyantram 1989
- Peruvazhiyambalam
- Oridathoru Phayalvaan
- Novemberinte Nashtam
- Innale
- Namukku Parkkan Munthiri Thoppukal
- Panchavadi Palam 1984
- Adaminte Variyellu 1983
- Manju 1983
- Aravam 1980
- Elippathayam
- Kodiyettam
- Swayamvaram
- Vasthuhara
- Pokkuveyil
- Chidambaram
- Kanchana Sita
- Kallichellamma
