= Mukha Chithram =

1991 film by Suresh Unnithan

- VCD cover
- Directed by: Suresh Unnithan
- Written by: J. Pallassery
- Produced by: Anil placheril Renjith; Murali; Jayan Mulangad
- Starring: Jayaram; Urvashi; Siddique; Jagathy Sreekumar; KPAC Lalitha; Sunitha; Jagadheesh
- Cinematography: Ramachandra Babu
- Edited by: J. Murali
- Music by: Mohan Sithara
- Production company: Rajaputhra Films
- Release date: 12 July 1991 (India)
- Country: India
- Language: Malayalam

Mukha Chithram (transl. Portrait) is a 1991 Indian Malayalam-language comedy drama and mystery film directed by Suresh Unnithan. The film stars Jayaram, Urvashi, Siddique, Jagathy Sreekumar, KPAC Lalitha, Sunitha and Jagadheesh in lead roles. The film has musical score by Mohan Sithara.

== Premise ==
Kannan Mash, a teacher, is tasked to find a good band teacher for his school. In his desperation, he decides to hire Mathukutty, a street musician, and lies to his superior, Govindan Mash, that he is actually a famous bandmaster named Sethumadhavan.

Mathukutty, as Sethumadhavan, soon becomes an important part of the school and even shares a brotherly bond with Gomathy Teacher, Govindan Mash's wife. But their friendship irks the dubious Govindan Mash, who begins to suspect that they're having an affair. Pushkaran, a school worker who is jealous of Kannan Mash and by extension Mathukutty/Sethumadhavan, fuels the fire inside Govindan Mash in order to get rid of both of them. This leads to some chaotic situations and Govindan Mash leaving his home, due to an ego clash with Gomathy Teacher.

To end the unfolding conundrum, Kannan Mash lies that Mathukutty/Sethumadhavan is married to a girl named Lakshmikutty, who cannot travel with him due to being pregnant. To cement the ruse, Kannan Mash and Mathukutty go to a studio, where they create a fake wedding photo using the image of a girl. But still, Govindan Mash has his doubts and Pushkaran senses something fishy. A woman who sells sweets in nearby houses however identifies the girl as Savithrikutty, a girl who had committed suicide, scaring Mathukutty/Sethumadhavan.

The whole situation takes a drastic turn when one stormy night, Mathukutty is surprised by the very same girl in the photo, who claims to be his wife Lakshmikutty. Gomathy Teacher is ecstatic, but Govindan Mash's doubts refuse to die down. Mathukutty meanwhile is confused and scared about the girl and her intentions, causing even Kannan Mash to question him.

After a series of turbulent events, Lakshmikutty herself reveals the truth behind who she is and why she came searching for Mathukutty. She is actually Savithrikutty, who lived with her elder brother and his wife. One day, a family friend saw the fake wedding photo of Savithrikutty and Mathukutty and informed her family, which led to her engagement being dropped and her family's honor ruined. In her sadness, Savithrikutty left her home one night with belongings to save her brother and family from the shame. But while going away, Savithrikutty witnessed a group of men leaving the dead body of a woman on a railway track, and was forced to flee when she got spotted. She hid from the men, and reached a convent, where she learned that due to her belongings and a part of her dress being found near the dead body, everybody has assumed that she has committed suicide, and her brother even finished her final rites. Despite her desire to go back home, Savithrikutty decides to stay away, knowing very well that the men who are hunting her could harm her brother and family.

Under the advice of the Head Nun, Savithrikutty finds the studio from where the fake wedding photo was made, and from there, she went to meet Kannan Mash. It is revealed that Kannan Mash knows the truth behind everything and convinced Savithrikutty to act as Lakshmikutty for a few days to patch up Govindan Mash and Gomathy Teacher's relationship. She also decided to use this chance to enact revenge on Mathukutty, who she thought was cunning and cruel, but ended up falling in love with him after knowing about his orphan childhood and kind heart.

As the truth comes to light, the men who were hunting Savithrikutty find her and kidnap her to tie up loose ends. Mathukutty, Kannan Mash, Govindan Mash and Pushkaran, who by now have learned the whole truth, unite and defeat the bad guys, rescuing Savithrikutty in the process.

In the end, Govindan Mash and Gomathy Teacher reunite and remarry, having cleared all doubts and egos between them. Mathukutty and Savithrikutty, having fallen in love, decide to get married themselves, as everything finally becomes rightfully right in the end.

== Cast ==
- Jayaram as Mathukutty / Sethumadhavan / Vareechan
- Urvashi as Savithrikutty / Lakshmikutty
- Siddique as Kannan Mash
- Jagathy Sreekumar as Govinda Menon Mash
- K. P. A. C. Lalitha as Gomathy Teacher
- Sunitha as Sunanda Teacher
- Jagadish as M. K. Pushkaran
- Sankaradi as Sunanda's Father
- Kollam Thulasi
- Nedumudi Venu as Fr. Felix
- N. L. Balakrishnan as Bahuleya Kurup
- Meena Ganesh as Seller
- Prof.Aliyar Kunju as Teacher
- Rajaputhra Renjith
- Sivaram

== Soundtrack ==
The songs was composed by Mohan Sithara and the lyrics were penned by O. N. V. Kurup.

| Song | Playback | Duration |
|---|---|---|
| Chembaranthin | K.J. Yesudas | 5:19 |
| Ponnavani Vattam | K.J. Yesudas, Chorus | 5:42 |

== Awards ==
Kerala Film Critics Award

- Special Award - Jagathy Sreekumar
- Special Award - Suresh Unnithan

Kerala State Film Award

- Best Actress- Urvashi
