= Ranjini =

Ranjini is a Sri Lankan refugee to Australia since 2010, who has been held in indefinite detention with her children since 2012 due to a negative assessment by the Australian Security Intelligence Organisation (ASIO), while at the same time a recognised refugee. Ranjini's story gained increased media attention since she was detained with her small children. Her case has raised questions about the ASIO's assessment process. It also highlighted the issue of mandatory detention in Australia, and in particular the issue of children living in detention.

== Biography ==
Ranjini's husband was killed in 2006 in the Vanni region of Sri Lanka. At a later date, Ranjini and her two small sons Pirai and Kathir escaped to India, from where they boarded a boat to Australia. Long after the boat had run out of food and fuel it finally arrived in Australian waters in April 2010. The Australian Navy brought them ashore for immigration processing on Christmas Island. Later the family of three has moved to Perth, Adelaide and in April 2011 to Brisbane, when they were released to community detention. They received refugee status 5 months later.

Ranjini married her second husband Ganesh in April 2012 and moved to Melbourne. Ganesh is a Sri Lankan from the same region as Ranjini, who studied in Australia and received a protection visa in 2009, and later was granted permanent residency.

In May 2012 the Department of Immigration and Citizenship (DIAC) summoned Ranjini and her two children and informed her of a negative assessment result from ASIO, without having been explained the reason. Ranjini, pregnant at that time, was flown to Villawood Immigration Detention Centre in Sydney along with her sons aged six and eight at the time. In January 2013 Ranjini delivered baby boy Paari in a Sydney hospital. Three days after the baby was born, both Ranjini and the baby were sent back to Villawood Detention Centre. As Ganesh is permanent resident, Paari is eligible for Australian citizenship, and on that basis could be allowed to leave the centre, but without her mother.

Many Australian refugee advocates have taken up Ranjini's cause, including lawyer David Manne from the RILC who has challenged her detention in the High Court. In January 2013, hundreds of people gathered across Australia to celebrate the birth of her third son at an event called Born Free. Refugee advocate Anthony Bieniak created a website - Letters For Ranjini to pay tribute to Ranjini and the other ASIO refugees. The website has collected hundreds of letters which have been passed on to the family.

ASIO has never given the reason why she is considered a threat to national security. Ranjini, as per other refugees with negative ASIO assessments, have no legal right to appeal. She cannot be deported since she has already been found to be legitimate refugee.
