= Ashokan (film director) =

Film Director (1962–2022)

- Born: 28 May 1961 (age 64); Varkala, Kerala, India
- Died: 25 September 2022
- Occupations: Film director screenwriter IT Head
- Years active: 1983 – 2003
- Known for: Varnam; Mookilla Rajyathu
- Spouse: Seetha
- Relatives: Abhirami PhD (daughter)

Raman Ashok Kumar (28 May 1961 – 25 September 2022), better known as Ashokan, was an Indian filmmaker from Kerala. He was also the Managing director of Auberon Technology, an IT firm operating in Abu Dhabi and Kochi.

Joining as an assistant director in Aattakalasam, he mastered the skills in directing feature films during his seven-year tutelage with Malayalam film director J. Sasikumar, Ashokan is known for his debut directorial Varnam (1989), a commercial success and Mookilla Rajyathu, the terrific classic comedy that you won't get bored even if you watch it countless times, as reviewed by The Times of India.

Ashokan has also directed Kanappurangal, which won the second best tele film at Kerala State television awards 2001.

Ashokan died in Kochi on 25 September 2022, at the age of 60.

== Filmography ==
Films

Year	Title	Actors	Language	Notes
1989	Varnam	Suresh Gopi, Jayaram, Ranjini	Malayalam	
1990	Saandram	Suresh Gopi, Parvathy, Innocent	Malayalam	Thaha as co-director
1991	Mookilla Rajyathu	Thilakan, Mukesh, Siddhique, Jagathy	Malayalam	Thaha as co-director
1993	Aacharyan	Thilakan, Sreenivasan, Suresh Gopi	Malayalam	
2001	Kanappurangal		Malayalam	Tele film
