= Suresh Unnithan =

Indian film director

P. Suresh Unnithan
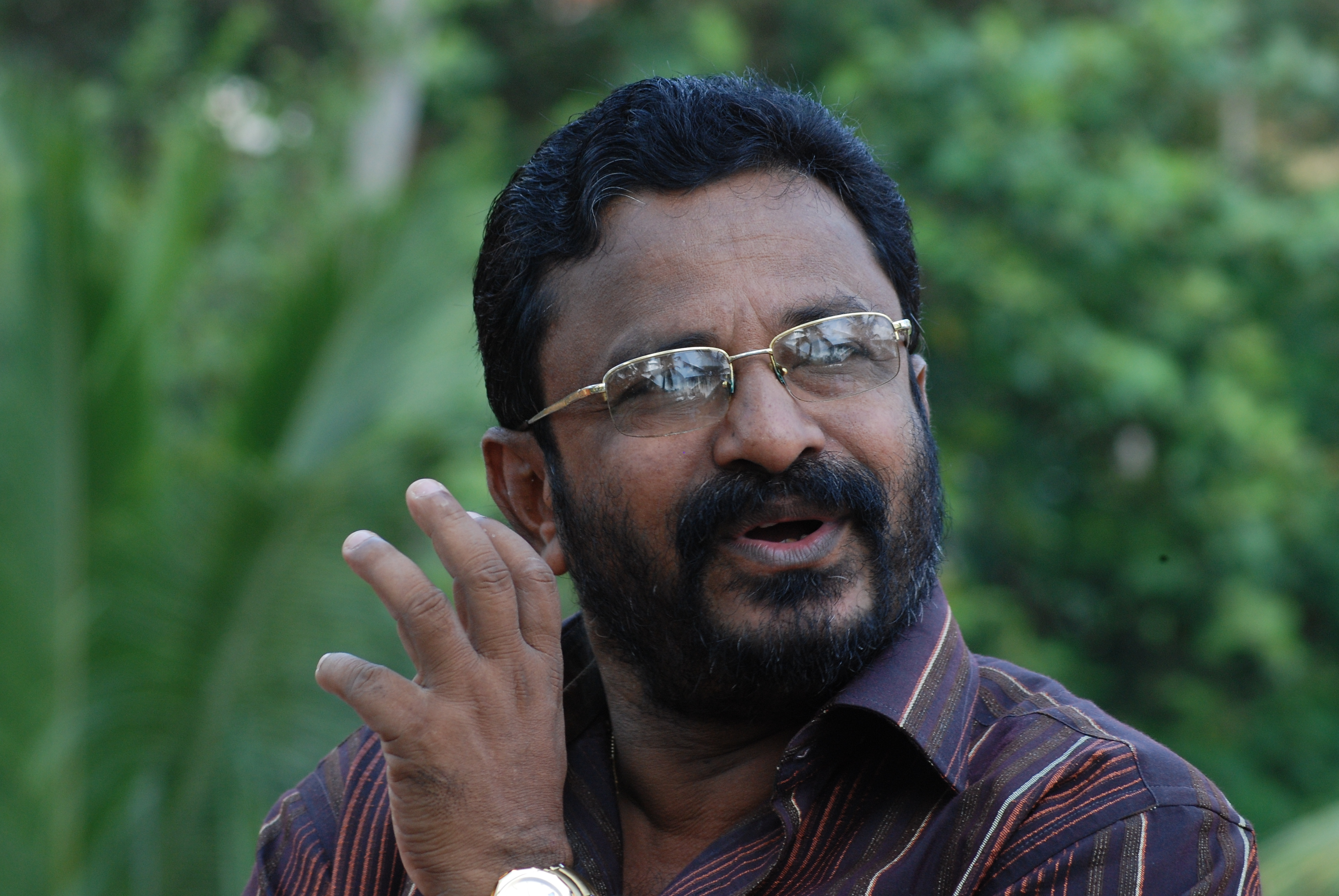
- Born: Pandalam, Pathanamthitta, Kerala
- Other name: Unni
- Occupations: Film director; writer; film producer
- Spouse: Padmaja
- Children: 2
- Parent(s): Parameswaran Unnithan, Bharathi Amma

P. Suresh Unnithan (born 30 July 1956) is an Indian film and television director who works in Malayalam films. His popular works are Mukha Chithram (1991), Utsavamelam (1992), Jaathakam (1989), Bhaagyavaan (1993) and Aardram (1992).

== Biography ==
His start in film was as an assistant director to Padmarajan, from whom he learned the basics and craft of film making. Later he debuted with Jaathakam. The same film won the Best Newcomer Director award at the Kerala State Film Awards. Later he directed films like Radhamadhavam, Aardram, Mukha Chitram, Uthsava melam, Sathyaparatinja, Bhagyavaan, Thovalapookkal, Rishya Sringan and others. He entered the television industry and had some hit serials. His 2004 serial project Swamy Ayyappan was the most popular and top rated serial in Malayalam.

After 12 years break Suresh Unnithan made a comeback with Ayaal, with Lal and Iniya playing the leads.

== Awards ==
- Kerala State Film Award for Best Debut Director (1989) – Jaathakam
- Kerala film critics award for Best Director (1991) – Radhamadhavam
- Asianet TV awards for Best Director(2008) -Swami Ayyappan
- Kerala State Film Award – Special Mention in Direction (2014)- Ayaal

== Television ==
Director

- Verpadukalude Viralpadukal (DD)
- Vegatha Pora Pora (DD)
- Sthree Oru Santhwanam (Asianet)
- Kadalinakkare (Asianet)
- Krishna Kripa Sagaram (Asianet)
- Swami Ayyappan (TV series) (Asianet)
- Sreekrishnaleela (Asianet)
- Sreemahabhagavatham (Asianet)
- Sreepadmanabham (Amrita TV)
- Thulabharam (Surya TV)
- Bhadra (Surya TV)
- Shivakami (Surya TV)

Producer banner- Rohini vision/ sree movies

- Vasundhara medicals (Asianet)
- Snehadooram (Asianet)
- Nirmalyam ( Asianet)
- Omanathinkal Pakshi (Asianet)
- Samadooram (Asianet)
- Sahadharmmini (Asianet)
- Tadankalpalayam (Asianet)
- Muhoortham (Asianet)
- Chechiyamma (Asianet)
- Sindhooracheppu (Amrita TV)
- Kunjali marakkar (Asianet)
- Lipstick (Asianet)
- Amala (Mazhavil Manorama)
- Viswaroopam (Flowers TV)
- Manjurukum Kalam (Mazhavil Manorama)
- Krishnathulasi (Mazhavil Manorama)
- Sthreepadham (Mazhavil Manorama)
- Manjil Virinja Poovu (Mazhavil Manorama)
- Jeevithanouka (Mazhavil Manorama)
- Kalyani (Mazhavil Manorama)
- Swayamvaram (Mazhavil Manorama)
- Gayathridevi Ente Amma (Mazhavil Manorama)

== Filmography ==
Year	Title
1989	Jaathakam
1990	Radha Madhavam
1991	Sathyaprathinja
1991	Mukha Chithram
1992	Utsavamelam
1992	Aardram
1993	Bhaagyavaan
1995	Thovalapookkal
1997	Rishyasringan
2013	Ayaal
2021	Kshanam
