= Sudheesh Sankar =

Indian film director

- Born: Kozhikode, Kerala, India
- Occupations: Film director; actor
- Years active: 1990–present
- Spouse: Anjitha
- Children: 2

Sudheesh Sankar is an Indian film director who has directed Malayalam television serials and a few Tamil and Malayalam films.

His first directorial was the film Aarumaname. Sankar is known for the Dileep film Villali Veeran and the popular Malayalam TV-series like Omanathinkal Pakshi, Ente Manasaputhri and Parasparam.

== Television ==
Television
Year	TV series	Lead cast	Channel	Notes	Ref.
2001	Durga	Srividya, Anjitha			
2004	Omanathinkal Pakshi	Lenaa, Srividya, Anju Aravind, Beena Antony	Asianet		
2005	Aalippazham	Sajitha Betti, Anand, Manka Mahesh	Surya TV		
2006	Shanghu Pushpam	Reshmi Soman, Divyaa Unni, Philomina	Asianet		
2006–2007	Kunjiyammakanju Makkalane	Sreelatha Namboothiri, Harishanth, Dilee p	Amrita TV	Comedy serial	
2006	Kaanakkinavu	Sujitha, Neenu, Archana Suseelan	Surya TV		
2007	Punarjanmam	Sreekala Sasidharan, Archana Suseelan, Srinath	Surya TV		
2007–2010	Ente Manasaputhri	Sreekala Sasidharan, Archana Suseelan, Sona Nair	Asianet		
2010	Snehatheeram	Sreekala Sasidharan, Archana Suseelan, Sajan Surya	Surya TV		
2011	Ardhachandrante Rathri	Sreelakshmi, Anand Thrissur, Beena Antony	Amrita TV	Adaptation of Ardh Chandini Ki Raat	
2012	Chila Nerangalil Chila Manushyar	Praveena, Vijay Menon	Amrita TV	Remake of Sila Nerangalil Sila Manithargal	
2013–2014	Parasparam	Rekha Ratheesh, Gayathri Arun, Vivek Gopan	Asianet	longest running serial in Malayalam Television	
2014	Durga	Niya, Archana Suseelan	Janam TV		
2014–2015	Pranayam	Srinish Aravind, Varada Jishin	Asianet		
2015	Sangamam	Sujitha, Boban Alummoodan, Neenu Karthika	Surya TV		
2016	Sneha Sangamam	Sujitha, Boban Alummoodan	Surya TV		
2017–2018	Malarvadi	Monisha Arshak, Kumarakam Raghunath, Anju Aravind, Beena Antony	Flowers TV		
2019–2020	Kabani	Gopika Anil, Mallika Sukumaran, Prem Jacob	Zee Keralam		
2020–2023	Paadatha Painkilli	Manisha, Sooraj, Archana Suseelan	Asianet		
2023	Malikappuram: Apathbandhavan Ayyappan	K.R.Vijaya, Elin	Asianet		

== Filmography ==
=== As a film director ===
Films as director
Year	Film	Language	Notes
2009	Aarumaname	Tamil	
2014	Villali Veeran	Malayalam	
2025	Maareesan	Tamil	

=== As an actor ===
Films as actor
Year	Film	Role	Notes
1991	Venal Kinavukal	Ravi	
1992	Aadhaaram		
2003	Melvilasam Sariyanu		
2013	Hotel California		
2015	Aakashangalil		
2015	Kukliyar		

== See also ==
- Cinema of India
