= Mazha Thorum Munpe =

Indian Malayalam-language drama series

- Genre: Soap opera
- Based on: Mazha Thorum Munpe by Joycee
- Written by: Joycee
- Directed by: Binu Vellathooval; Manu Joy C; Manoj Rajendran
- Starring: Nikitha Rajesh; Vaishnavi Saikumar
- Voices of: Anna Mariya; Divya Binu
- Theme music composer: Arun Muraleedharan
- Opening theme: "Aakashakoodarathil" by Manu Manjith and Aavani Malhar
- Country of origin: India
- Original language: Malayalam
- No. of episodes: 460

Production
- Producers: Sangeeth P. Rajan; Jerry Simon; Manu Joy C
- Production location: Kochi
- Cinematography: Gessal Sebastian
- Editors: Vishnu Harimukham; Binish Raj
- Camera setup: Multi-camera
- Running time: 20-22 minutes
- Production company: Dhuryodhana Entertainments

Original release
- Network: Asianet; JioHotstar
- Release: 7 July 2025 – present

Mazha Thorum Munpe (transl. Before the rain stops) is an Indian Malayalam language television soap opera. The series is based on the novel of the same name by Joycee. It aired on 7 July 2025 on Asianet and stars Nikitha Rajesh, Vaishnavi Saikumar, Kishore Peethambaran, Santhosh Keezhattoor and Rahul Suresh in lead roles.

== Plot ==
The story follows three orphans raised by Brijithamma at the Snehaniketam orphanage: Aleena, Revathykutty, and Chinnukutty. Upon learning she is terminally ill, Brijithamma arranges for their futures. Chinnukutty is moved to another orphanage, while Revathykutty becomes a domestic helper for a couple, Mamachan and Graceamma.

Brijithamma visits Kunjiramamenon in Pala, seeking a home for Aleena. Driven by past guilt, Kunjiramamenon travels to Kazhakoottam with his grandson, Manushankar (Manu). He instructs Manu to bring Aleena to their ancestral home under the pretense of hiring a caretaker for his bedridden wife, Saudamini. Before dying, Brijithamma reveals to Aleena that Kunjiramamenon's daughter, Vyjayanthi, is her biological mother.

Following Kunjiramamenon's death, Manu brings Aleena to the ancestral home alongside Balachandran, Vyjayanthi's husband. Vyjayanthi resents Aleena's presence, viewing her as a threat to her household. Meanwhile, Manu develops romantic feelings for Aleena. Parallelly, Mamachan and Graceamma accept Revathykutty as their foster daughter. They discover that their late son, Jomon, had a child with his fiancée, Sherin; however, their search stalls when they find Sherin mentally unstable and her family hostile.

Tension mounts when Aleena’s half-brother, Rohit, and cousin, Harishankar, attempt to assault her. In the aftermath, Balachandran overhears a phone call between Aleena and Revathykutty, leading him to doubt Aleena’s background. He records her calls and discovers her true parentage. Balachandran consults Vyjayanthi's elder brother, Colonel Gangadhara Menon, in Nilgiri, who reveals that Vyjayanthi had an affair with a colleague, Captain Stanley Joseph, while working as a teacher in Agra, resulting in Aleena's birth. Shaken by the revelation, Balachandran suffers a cardiac arrest. Upon recovering, he distances himself emotionally from Vyjayanthi while accepting Aleena as a daughter.

The rest of the family misinterprets Balachandran's affection for Aleena as an illicit affair. To protect Vyjayanthi's reputation, Balachandran falsely claims that Aleena is his own illegitimate daughter born before their marriage. Enraged, Vyjayanthi leaves the home and suffers a severe road accident. Seeking revenge, her brothers, Shivashankaran and Rajeevan, kidnap Aleena. Colonel Gangadharan intervenes and reveals to the brothers that Aleena is Vyjayanthi's daughter and their biological niece.

Later, Harishankar plans to assault his girlfriend, Saranya, along with Rohit and two others. Rohit panics and withdraws, but all four are arrested. Drawing on her background at the orphanage, Aleena supports Saranya through the legal process and trauma recovery. Following Saranya's testimony, Rohit receives bail. Overcome with guilt, he struggles to re-integrate into society, but Aleena helps him reform.

When a recovered Vyjayanthi demands Aleena's eviction and threatens Balachandran with separation, Aleena chooses to leave to restore peace. Balachandran tracks down her biological father, Retired Colonel Stanley Joseph, to demand he take responsibility for his daughter.

Stanley, now an alcoholic living in isolation post retirement, was separated from Vyjayanthi years prior due to interference from both of their respectable families which culminated in an orchestrated accident that had left him in a coma. Though Aleena experiences a luxurious lifestyle at Stanley's estate, she struggles with his alcoholism and reckless behavior. Stanley's family opposes her arrival, but his father, Kottaramattathil Oudhakutty, eventually accepts her after noticing her resemblance to his late wife, Chinnamma. Stanley opposes Aleena’s romance with Manu due to the history of family betrayals. Later, Aleena and Revathykutty discover that Sherin is Stanley's younger sister, opening a path to locating Jomon and Sherin's child.

== Cast ==
=== Main ===
- Nikitha Rajesh as Aleena Stanley: Vyjayanthi and Stanley's daughter who grew up as an orphan.
- Vaishnavi Saikumar as Vyjayanthi Menon: Aleena's biological mother; Rohit, Babitha and Krishnaja's mother
- Kishore Peethambaran as Nedumpurakkal Balachandra Menon: Vyjayanthi's husband; Aleena's adoptive father
- Santhosh Keezhattoor as Retd Colonel Kottaramattathil Stanley Joseph: Vyjayanthi's former lover, Aleena's biological father
- Rahul Suresh as Manushankar Menon: Vyjayanthi's nephew and Aleena's love interest

=== Recurring ===
Palarivattom family

- Keziah Thomas as Revathikutty: Aleena's foster-sister; Graceamma and Mamachan's adoptive daughter; Rohit's love-interest.
- Saju Kodiyan as Mamachan: Revathikutty's adoptive father.
- K.S Maneesha as Graceamma: Revathikutty's adoptive mother

Nedumpurakkal Family

- Veda Vyas as Rohit Balachandran: Vyjayanthi and Balachandran's eldest son; Aleena's half-brother; Revathykutty's love interest
- Shehanas Husian as Babitha Balachandran: Vyjayanthi and Balachandran's elder daughter, Aleena's half-sister
- Janvi Muralidharan as Krishnaja Balachandran: Vyjayanthi and Balachandran's youngest daughter, Aleena's half-sister

Kaithakkal Family

- Roslin as Soudamini Amma: Vyjayanthi, Gangadharan, Shivashankaran and Rajeevan's mother; Aleena's maternal grandmother; Kunjiraman Menon's widow
- Anand Kumar as Gangadharan Menon: Vyjayanthi's eldest brother
- Badusha N.M. as Shivashankara Menon: Vyjayanthi's second eldest brother; Manushankar's father
- Nitha Promy as Kamala: Shivashankaran's wife; Manushankar's mother
- Abhijith M. K. as Harishankar Menon: Manushankar's younger brother
- Sumesh Surendran as Rajeevan Menon: Vyjayanthi's third brother
- Kalashala Ashokan as Kaithakkal Malikaveetil Kunjiraman Menon: Vyjayanthi, Gangadharan, Shivashankaran and Rajeevan's deceased father; Aleena's maternal grandfather
- Zaina Zakker as Ranjini Menon: Manu's younger sister
- Dini Daniel as Malathi: Gangadharan's wife

Kottaramattathil Family

- Kottayam Achankunju as Kottaramattathil Oudhakutty: Stanley's father, Aleena's paternal grandfather
- Ashika Ashokan / Tonisha Kapileswarapu as Sherin "Ranimol": Oudhakutty's youngest daughter, Stanley's younger sister, Aleena's paternal aunt, Tony's wife; Jijo's ex-fiancee
- Balan Mannadiyar as Tony: Sherin's husband
- Rohit S. Warrier as Robichan: Stanley's youngest brother
- Jismy Satheesan as Ancy: Robichan's wife
- Kalabhavan Jinto as Albichan: Stanley's younger brother
- Sumi Santhosh as Elsamma: Stanley's wife; Tania, Telsa and Tojo's mother
- Devi Ajith as Reethamma: Elsamma's manipulative elder sister
- Devananda Pattalathil as Tania: Stanley and Elsamma's eldest daughter; Aleena's half-sister
- Sringa Syam as Telsa: Stanley and Elsamma's mentally challenged daughter ; Aleena's half-sister
- Farvin Khan as Tojo: Stanley and Elsamma's youngest son ; Aleena's half-brother

=== Others ===
- Shobha Mohan as Brijithamma: Aleena's foster-mother in Snehaniketanam orphanage
- Abigael Maria John as Chinnukutty: A four year old orphan in Snehaniketam
- Swara Shankar as Saranya: Harishankar's ex-girlfriend who was gang-raped by Hari and his friends.
- Ronnie Vincent as Dr Sharma: Balachandran's neighbour and Rinku's owner.
- Jixil Phillip as Gopan: Saranya's elder brother
- Pravek Marar as Omanakuttan: Saranya's younger brother
- Anu Aneesa as Saranya's mother
- Shibin K. David as Josutty: Mamachan's driver
- Gopika as Sulochana: Balachandran's sister
- Abhilash / Siddharth as Auto Shaji
- Mohan Bala as S.I. Rameshan Nambiar
- Gopu Padaveedan as C.I. Gopalakrishna Panicker
- Blessy Kurien as Shailaja
- Shafna Nizam as Urmila
- Kalidasan as Young Balachandran (Photo appearance)
- Noobin Johny as Jijo (Photo appearance)

== Production ==
=== Development ===
Mazha Thorum Munpe is a television adaptation of the novel of the same name by Joycee, which was originally serialized in Manorama Weekly between 2006 and 2010 under the female pseudonym C.V. Nirmala.

=== Casting ===
Nikitha Rajesh plays the central character, Aleena thus marking her third collaboration with Joycee after Omanathinkal Pakshi and Manjurukum Kalam. Vaishnavi Saikumar plays Vyjayanthi, Aleena's estranged mother. Rahul Suresh who previously worked in Kaathodu Kaathoram plays the male lead, Manushankar. Writer Joycee's own grand-daughter, Abigael made her debut as a child actor. Former child actor, Keziah Thomas plays the second female lead, Revathykutty. The series also features Rony Vincent as Dr. Sharma, marking his return to acting after nearly four decades after his debut in Chillu (1982).

=== Filming ===
In January 2026, a behind-the-scenes video of a car accident sequence from the series gained significant traction on social media due to its realistic execution.

== Reception ==
Month / Period	Rank	Ref.
July 2025	6	
September 2025	3	
October 2025	2	
November 2025	3	
January 2026	4	
February 2026	3	
March 2026	3	
April 2026	5	
May 2026	3	

TRP ratings have not been published since 2 July 2026, after the Ministry of Information and Broadcasting (India) directed BARC to suspend the publication of television ratings across all genres until its licence is renewed under the Television Ratings Policy, 2026.

== Adaptations ==
Language	Title	Original release	Network(s)	Last aired	Notes	Ref.
Telugu	Ye Devi Varamo Neevu ఏ దేవీ వరమో నీవు	6 July 2026	Star Maa	Ongoing	Remake	
Hindi	Sayoneee सयोनी	23 September 2026	StarPlus	Ongoing	Remake	
Kannada	Saraswathi Chandra ಸರಸ್ವತಿ ಚಂದ್ರ	TBA	Colors Kannada	Upcoming	Remake	

== Awards and nominations ==
Year	Award	Category	Recipient	Result	Ref.
2026	Asianet Television Awards	Best Actor	Kishore Peethambaran	Won	
2026	Asianet Television Awards	Best Actress	Nikitha Rajesh	Nominated	
2026	Asianet Television Awards	Best Star Pair	Nikitha Rajesh and Rahul Suresh	Won	
2026	Asianet Television Awards	Best New Face (Male)	Veda Vyas	Nominated	
2026	Asianet Television Awards	Best New Face (Female)	Janvi Muralidharan	Nominated	
2026	Asianet Television Awards	Best Supporting Actor (Female)	Vaishnavi Saikumar	Nominated	
2026	Asianet Television Awards	Best Supporting Actor (Male)	Anand Thrissur	Nominated	
2026	Asianet Television Awards	Most Popular Character Actor (Female)	Vaishnavi Saikumar	Won	
2026	Asianet Television Awards	Most Popular Character Actor (Male)	Anand Thrissur	Nominated	
2026	Asianet Television Awards	Best Actor in Negative role (Male)	Abhijith M.K	Nominated	
2026	Asianet Television Awards	Best Serial	Mazha Thorum Munpe	Won	
2026	Asianet Television Awards	Popular Serial	Mazha Thorum Munpe	Won	
2026	Asianet Television Awards	Best Cameraman	Gessal Sebastian	Won	
2026	Asianet Television Awards	Life Time Achievement	Roslin	Won	
2026	Asianet Television Awards	Best Scriptwriter (Original)	Joycee	Won	
2026	Asianet Television Awards	Popular Director	Binu Vellathooval	Won	
2026	Asianet Television Awards	Best Audiography	Sreekuttan	Nominated	
2026	Asianet Television Awards	Best Dubbing Artist (Female)	Anna Mariya	Nominated	
2026	4th Kerala Vision Television Awards	Best Actor	Kishore Peethambaran	Won	
2026	4th Kerala Vision Television Awards	Outstanding Performer	Vaishnavi Saikumar	Won	
2026	4th Kerala Vision Television Awards	Best Director	Manoj Rajendran	Won	
2026	4th Kerala Vision Television Awards	Best Serial		Won	
