= Out of Range =

Out of Range may refer to:

- Out of Range (album), a 1994 album by Ani DiFranco
- Out of Range (film), a 2016 Indian film
- Out of Range, a 2022 short drama film by John Harvey
