= America Ammayi =

America Ammayi may refer to:

- America Ammayi (film), a 1976 Indian Telugu-language film
- America Ammayi (TV series), a Telugu soap opera
