= Malli (2024 TV series) =

Tamil-language program

- Genre: Drama
- Created by: Saregama
- Written by: Saregama
- Screenplay by: Marimuthu; Rajashri Rai; V.Padmavathy (180-Present) (dialogue); Maruthu Sankar; Prabhakar; Dhamayanthi
- Directed by: Manibharathy (1-35/230-680); Stalin (36-178); A.P. Rajendran (179- 229); Sai Maruthu (1-35/681-)
- Starring: Vijay Venkatesan; Nikitha Rajesh; Rahila Sayedh
- Theme music composer: Dharan
- Opening theme: "Sirithu Vaazha Vendum" K.S.Chitra (Vocals) Pulamaipithan (Lyrics)
- Country of origin: India
- Original language: Tamil
- No. of seasons: 1
- No. of episodes: 800+

Production
- Production location: Tamil Nadu
- Cinematography: Akilan
- Editor: Shanker
- Camera setup: Multi-camera
- Running time: Approx.20–22 minutes per episode
- Production company: Saregama

Original release
- Network: Sun TV
- Release: 29 April 2024

Malli is an Indian Tamil television drama starring Nikitha Rajesh, Vijay Venkatesan and Rahila Sayedh. The series is directed by Manibharathy / Sai Maruthu / Stalin / A.P.Rajendran / Manibharathy / Sai Maruthu. It premiered on 29 April 2024 airing on Sun TV. It is also available on digital platform Sun NXT.

Malli is a 2024 Indian Tamil-language television series starring Nikitha Rajesh, Vijay Venkatesan, and Rahila Sayedh. The series was produced by Saregama. It premiered on 29 April 2024 on Sun TV. Due to new serial Parasakthi it completed its journey and shifted Malli at 7.30 pm.

== Cast ==
=== Main ===
- Nikitha Rajesh as Malliga Vijayakumar (Malli): Vijay's second wife
- Vijay Venkatesan as Vijayakumar (Vijay): Renuka and Malli's husband; Venba's father
- Rahila Sayedh as Venba Vijaykumar: Vijay and Renuka's daughter

=== Recurring ===
- Mahalashmi Shankar as Rajeshwari Krishna Kumar alias Raji: Vijay's eldest sister; krishna kumar's husband ; Ananya's mother (Main Antagonist)
- Gracy Thangavel as Ranjitha: Vijay's niece
- VJ Akshaya / Nagashree GS as Renuka Vijayakumar (Vijay's first wife and Venba's mother) / Sudarvizhi
- Bharathi Mohan as Kathiresan: Renuka's father
- Niranjana as Nisha: Renuka's sister
- Dev Anand Sharma as Manohar: Vijay's brother-in-law
- Krithika Annamalai as Nagalakshmi a.k.a Nagu: Malli's sister-in-law
- Venkat Subramanian / Ashwin Kumar as Pathram Babu a.k.a Babu: Malli's elder brother
- Sanjay Asrani as Raghuram : Vijay's rival
- Yadhavi as Inspector S. Deepika : Dinesh's sister
- Harirudran as Advocate Deepak alias Deepan: Deepika husband
- Dhanushree / Unknown as Mayil: Malli's younger sister
- Mahesh Prabha as Inspector Aarumugam
- Sindhuja Viji as Kavitha: Sanjay's mother
- Nalini as Annapoorani: Malli's aunt
- Jay Srinivasa Kumar as Aravind: Malli's best friend
- Nisha Kapoor as Chitra Manohar: Vijay's elder sister
- Ambika as Podhum Ponnu: Vijay's step-mother
- Priya as Sivagami: Renuka's mother
- Poornima Bhagyaraj as Advocate Vidhya: Vijay's adopted mother
- Madhan Bob as Subramaniyam: Vijay's father
- Uma Padmanabhan as Advocate Devasena
- Sabari Ganesh as Dinesh: Malli's obsessed lover
- Nikitha Murali as Meera: Malli's friend
- Rokinth as Velan: Kumudha's husband
- Nithish Kutty as Mani: Malli's younger brother

== Production ==
=== Development ===
After the ending of the longest running Sun TV drama Anbe Vaa.

=== Casting ===
Vijay Venkatesan was cast in the male lead role as Vijayakumar after his role as Karthikeyan in Zee Tamil`s Peranbu, while actress Nikitha Rajesh was cast as the female lead role as Malli, marking her return after Zee Tamil`s Suryavamsam. Roja serial fame Akshaya Mohan Kumar replaced later by Nagashree GS, actress Nalini, Poornima Bhagyaraj joined the cast.

On 3 June 2024, actress Ambika was cast as Pothum Ponnu.

=== Release ===
The show started airing on Sun TV on 29 April 2024 from Monday to Sunday, replacing 'Anbe Vaa'.
