= Ente Manasaputhri =

Indian soap opera

- Genre: Soap opera
- Created by: K. K. Sudhakaran
- Based on: Punarjanmam
- Written by: Dinesh Pallathu
- Directed by: Sudheesh Sankar
- Creative director: Baiju Devaraj
- Starring: Sreekala Sasidharan; Archana Suseelan
- Theme music composer: Sanjeev Lal
- Opening theme: "Akale Pokayo" sung by Sayanora Philip
- Ending theme: "Onnamkili" sung by Manjari
- Country of origin: India
- Original language: Malayalam
- No. of seasons: 1
- No. of episodes: 733

Production
- Producer: Baiju Devaraj
- Cinematography: Anpu Mani
- Editor: Baiju Deveraj
- Camera setup: Multi-camera
- Running time: approx. 20-22 minutes per episode
- Production company: Sandras Communication

Original release
- Network: Asianet
- Release: 16 July 2007 – 21 May 2010

Ente Manasaputhri (transl. The Daughter of My Mind) was a 2007 Malayalam television soap opera telecast on Asianet TV from Monday to Friday at 7:00PM IST. It was a sequel to Punarjanmam, which aired on Surya TV and telecast 95 episodes. It is remarked as one of the top-rated TV series in Malayalam with a star cast.

== Plot ==
The story revolves around two orphans, Sofia and Gloria, who are starkly different in nature and temperaments. Sofia (played by Sreekala) is calm and simple whereas Gloria (played by Archana) is ambitious and extrovert. The story is mainly about the life and rivalry of Sofia and Gloria and also on human relationships, misunderstandings, love, jealousy, greed, and sacrifice.

== Cast ==
Lead Cast

- Sreekala Sasidharan as Sofiya
- Archana Suseelan as Gloriya
- Namitha Pramod as Anjali
- Sona Nair as Sandhya Menon
- Beena Antony as Yamuna
- Sreenath as Devan
- Rajeev Parameshwar as Prakash

Other Cast

- Jayan Cherthala as Thobiyas
- Fazal Razi as Adarsh Menon
- Souparnika Subash as Deepa
- Bindu Murali as Sarojini
- Venu Nagavally as Chandrasekhar
- Shiju Abdul Rasheed as Arjun
- Prem Kumar as Anirudhan
- Shammi Thilakan as Ananthagopan
- Karthika Kannan as Mumtaz
- Arya as Kareena
- Rajasenan as Rajasenan
- Vijayakumari
- Kottayam Rasheed as CI
- Vijay Menon as DYSP
- Balaji Sharma as Bakker Pookottil
- Murugan as Murugan
- Kollam Thulasi as Balabhadran
- V K Baiju as Krishnamoorthy
- Adam Ayoob as DIG
- G.K.Pillai as Narayanan
- Sreekala as Ammini
- Kulappulli Leela as Ponnammma
- Kallayam Krishnadas as Ayyappan
- Dileep Shankar as Benjamin
- Murali Mohan as Shiva Subramaniam
- G.K.Pillai as Warrier
- Hima Shankar as Jennifer
- Sarath Das
- T. P. Madhavan
- Thesni Khan
- Dinesh Panicker
- Baby Malavika
- P. Sreekumar
- Suma Jayaram
- Kalabhavan Prajod

== Adaptations ==
Language	Title	Original release	Network(s)	Last aired	Notes
Malayalam	Ente Manasaputhri എന്റെ മാനസപുത്രി	16 July 2007	Asianet	21 May 2010	Original
Tamil	Maharani மகாராணி	19 October 2009	Star Vijay	4 November 2011	Remake
