= Arya (actress) =

Indian actress, comedian, television presenter

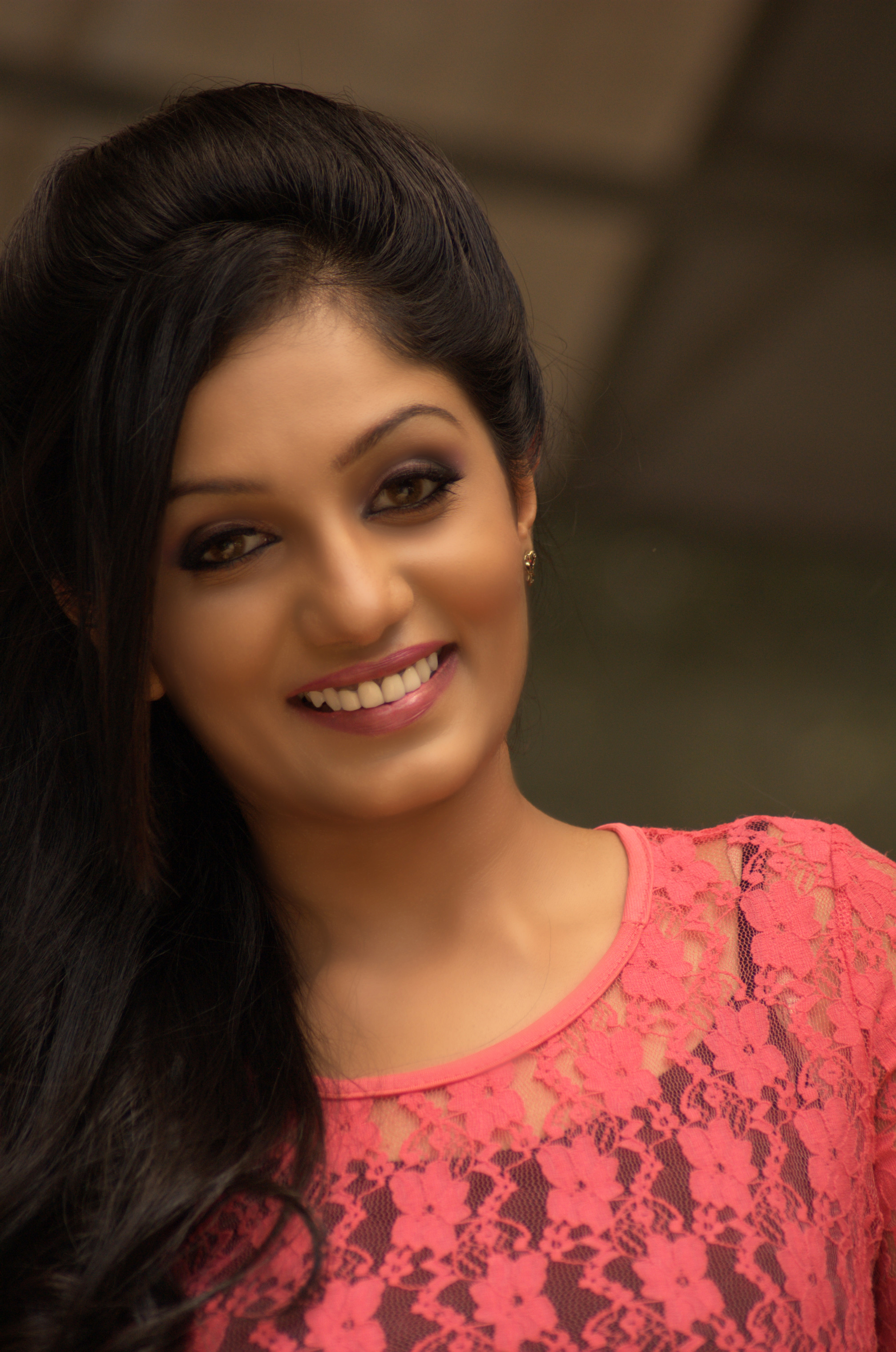
- Arya
- Born: December 18, 1985 (age 40); Thiruvananthapuram, Kerala, India
- Other names: Arya Babu, Arya Rohit, Arya
- Occupations: Actress; comedian; TV host; model; entrepreneur
- Years active: 2006–present
- Spouse(s): Rohit Suseelan (m. 2008; sep. 2018) Sibin Benjamin (m. 2025)

Arya Babu, also known by her stage name Arya Badai, is an Indian actress, comedian, model, and television presenter, who appears in Malayalam films and television. She started her career in television and modelling industry. She is best known as a regular comedian in the television comedy Badai Bungalow on Asianet. She has acted on several television series and later turned a television host and also forayed into films. She participated in second season of the Malayalam reality TV series Bigg Boss.

== Early life and background ==
Arya hails from Thiruvananthapuram. She studied at Holy Angel's Convent Thiruvananthapuram. She is a dancer trained in Western, cinematic, and semi-classical styles.

== Career ==
Arya made her acting debut while she was studying in plus two (higher secondary) when she got the offer to appear in the television series Officer on Amrita TV. She appeared in two stories and after that she got married. Her sister-in-law Kalpana Susheelan was a model, it persuaded her to search for a career in modelling and began working in commercials for leading clients in the industry, including Chennai Silks and Chemmanur Jewellers. It was followed by her first major role in television, the Tamil soap opera Maharani (2009 – 2011) which was a remake of the Malayalam serial Ente Manasaputhri starring her sister-in-law Archana Suseelan. After that she took a maternity leave for around two years; on return, she acted in serials such as Mohakkadal, Achante Makkal, and Ardram.

The turning point in her career came after contesting in the reality television series Stars on Asianet, which was for serial artists. In one of the episodes she acted on a spoof of the film Njan Gandharvan. Her performance was appreciated by the channel and recommended her name to Diana Sylvester, producer of newly launching comedy show Badai Bungalow (2013 – 2018) who was looking for an actress for Ramesh Pisharody's wife. It was her foray as a comedian and a break in her career. She was a regular in the cast and portrayed a loggerhead named Arya. While doing Badai Bungalow she also did stage show and most notably, the serial Sthreedhanam on Asianet, in which she played Pooja, a bold and outspoken daughter-in-law with a black belt in Karate. The role gave her appreciation.

Later, she began hosting a cookery show on television and also acted in a number of Malayalam films. In 2020, she contested in the second season of the Malayalam reality TV series Bigg Boss (Malayalam season 2), hosted by actor Mohanlal on Asianet. From 2019-2023, She hosted first, second, fourth and fifth seasons of popular the musical game show Start Music Aaradhyam Paadum on Asianet.

== Personal life ==
She married IT engineer Rohit Susheelan and they have a daughter named Roya. Rohit is the brother of television actress Archana Suseelan. In 2018, she opened a boutique named Aroya in Vazhuthacaud. In January 2019, Arya revealed that she is living with her daughter separately from her husband. On 20 August 2025, she married RJ Sibin Benjamin.

== Filmography ==
Key
| † | Denotes films that have not yet been released |

=== Film ===
| Year | Title | Role | Notes |
|---|---|---|---|
| 2010 | Fiddle | Album actress | Special appearance |
| 2015 | Lailaa O Lailaa | Deccan Exports receptionist | |
| 2015 | Oru Second Class Yathra | Young lady in the train | |
| 2015 | Kunjiramayanam | Mallika | |
| 2016 | Pa Va | Sister Emily | |
| 2016 | Pretham | Shalini | Cameo appearance |
| 2016 | Thoppil Joppan | Joppan's fiancée (Nurse) | Cameo |
| 2017 | Alamara | Suvin's proposed lady | Cameo |
| 2017 | Honey Bee 2: Celebrations | Sara Pereira | |
| 2017 | Adventures of Omanakuttan | Sumathi | Cameo |
| 2017 | Honeybee 2.5 | Sara Pereira / Herself | Cameo |
| 2017 | Punyalan Private Limited | Golda | |
| 2018 | Sukhamano Daveede | Dona | |
| 2019 | Ganagandharvan | Sanitha | |
| 2019 | Ulta | | |
| 2020 | Uriyadi | Shiny Matthew | |
| 2022 | Meppadiyan | Aannie | |
| 2022 | In | Sreeba | |
| 2022 | Two Men | Jaseena | |
| 2023 | 90:00 Minutes | Ancy | |
| 2023 | Enthada Saji | Mini | |
| 2023 | Queen Elizabeth | Sangeeta | |
| 2025 | Identity | Latha Dinesh | |
| 2025 | Machante Maalakha | Rameshan's wife | |
| 2026 | Christina | Indumathi | |

== Television ==
| Year | Show | Network | Role | Notes |
|---|---|---|---|---|
| 2006 | Man | DD Malayalam | Herself | |
| 2007 | Officer | Amrita TV | Uncredited | Debut |
| 2007 | Ente Manasaputhri | Asianet | Kareena | |
| 2008 | Rainbow | Kairali TV | Host | |
| 2009–2011 | Maharani | Star Vijay | Suja | Tamil TV series |
| 2009 | Kunjiyammakku Anchu Makkalane | Amrita TV | Aruna | |
| 2010 | Swapnakoodu Season 2 | ACV | Host | |
| 2010 | Hit Bazar | Asianet | Host | |
| 2012 | Chandralekha | Asianet | Varsha | |
| 2012 | Achante Makkal | Surya TV | Sherin | |
| 2012 | Nakshathradeepangal | Kairali TV | Herself as Participant | |
| 2012–2013 | Nilapakshi | Kairali TV | Akhila | |
| 2013 | Pathinu Pathu | Surya TV | Pooja | |
| 2013 | Pennu Pidicha Pulival | Asianet | | Telefilm |
| 2013–2016 | Sthreedhanam | Asianet | Pooja Prasad | |
| 2013 | Ardram | Asianet | Malavika | |
| 2013 | Munch Stars | Asianet | Herself as Contestant | Reality TV show |
| 2013–2018 | Badai Bungalow | Asianet | Arya | Comedy talk show |
| 2014 | Mohakkadal | Surya TV | Ananthu's wife | |
| 2014 | Sarayu | Surya TV | Vasudha | |
| 2014–2015 | Ishtam | Surya TV | Pooja Karthik | |
| 2015 | Kenal Sasiude Onam | Asianet | | Telefilm |
| 2016 | Kana Kanmani | Asianet | Sarayu Manu | |
| 2016 | Action Zero Shiju | Kairali TV | Kanchana Dineshan | |
| 2016 | Sell Me the Answer | Asianet | Herself as Participant | |
| 2017 | Chill Bowl | Asianet | Host | Cookery show |
| 2017 | Taste Time | Asianet | Host | Cookery show |
| 2017 | Tamaar Pataar | Flowers TV | Cameo | Title song presence |
| 2017 | Yuva Awards | Asianet | Host | Award night |
| 2017–2018 | Melam Marakkatha Swadh | Flowers TV | Host | Reality TV show |
| 2018 | Kitex Flowers Music Awards | Flowers TV | Host | Award night |
| 2018 | Vanitha Film Awards | Mazhavil Manorama | Host | Award night |
| 2018 | Nakshtrathilakkam | Mazhavil Manorama | Host | Chat show |
| 2018 | Ammamazhavillu | Mazhavil Manorama | Host | Stage show |
| 2018 | Lalitham 50 | Mazhavil Manorama | Performer | Special show |
| 2018 | Annies kitchen | Amrita TV | Guest | Chat show |
| 2018 | Day With a Star | Kaumudy TV | Guest | Interview |
| 2018 | JB Junction | Kairali TV | Guest | Interview |
| 2018 | Bharya | Asianet | Kadambari Krishnaprasad | Photo presence |
| 2018–2019 | Thakarppan Comedy Mimicry Mahamela | Mazhavil Manorama | Host | Comedy Show |
| 2018–2019 | Thamasha Bazaar | Zee Keralam | Rejani / Jenifer | Comedy talk show |
| 2019 | Little Star | - | Jury | Event |
| 2019–2020 | Badai Bungalow (season 2) | Asianet | Arya | Comedy talk show |
| 2019–2020 | Start Music Aaradhyam Paadum | Asianet | Host | Reality TV show |
| 2020 | Bigg Boss (Malayalam season 2) | Asianet | Herself as contestant | Reality TV series |
| 2020 – 2021 | Priyappetta Naattukkare | Amrita TV | Host | |
| 2020 – 2021 | Comedy Stars Season 2 | Asianet | Judge | |
| 2020 – 2021 | Start Music Season 2 | Asianet | Host | |
| 2020 | Christmas Thaaramelam | Asianet | Host | |
| 2020-2021 | Sruthi Star Singer | Asianet | Various roles | Special appearance in Skit |
| 2021 | Boom Rang Village | YouTube | Jefry | Web series |
| 2021 | Boeing Boeing | YouTube | Angel Rodriguez | Web Series |
| 2021 | Vishu Dhamaka | Asianet | Host | |
| 2021 | Onam Mamankam | Asianet | Host | |
| 2021 | Aram+Aram=Kinnaram | Surya TV | Co-Host | |
| 2021 | Tharapakittu | Kaumudy TV | Guest | |
| 2021 | Welcome 2021 | Kairali TV | Herself | |
| 2021 | Valkkanadi | Asianet | Host | |
| 2022 | Velivillakunnu Police station | YouTube | SI Draupadi | Web series |
| 2022 | Sa Re Ga Ma Pa Keralam | Zee Keralam | Herself | |
| 2022 | Bzinga | Zee Keralam | Participant | Game show |
| 2022 | Jayettan's Pooram | Amrita TV | Host | Vishu special show |
| 2022 | Bigg Boss (Malayalam season 4) | Asianet | Co-host | For Birthday special episode of Mohanlal |
| 2022 | Start Music Aaradhyam Padum Season 4 | Asianet | Host | |
| 2023 | Flowers Oru Kodi | Flowers | Participant | |
| 2023 | Funs Upon a Time | Amrita TV | Mentor | |
| 2023 | Bigg Boss (Malayalam season 5) | Asianet | Co-host | For Birthday special episode of Mohanlal |
| 2023 | Start Music Aaradhyam Padum Season 5 | Asianet | Host | |
| 2023 | Abhishag | YouTube | Durga | Short film |
| 2025 | Fun Baby Fun | Surya TV | | |
| 2025-present | Oru Chiri Iru Chiri Bumper Chiri | Mazhavil Manorama | Recurring Judge / Host | |
| 2025-2026 | Bumper Chiri Unlimited Chiri | Mazhavil Manorama | Judge | |
