= Roslin (Malayalam actress) =

Indian actress

- Citizenship: Indian
- Occupation: Actress
- Years active: 1983–present
- Awards: Kerala State Film Award for Second Best Actress

Roslin is an Indian actress who worked in Malayalam films and television. She bagged the Kerala State Film Award for Second Best Actress for her role in 2003 film, Paadam Onnu: Oru Vilapam.

== Filmography ==
Year	Film	Role
1983	Nadham	Unknown
1993	Padheyam	Nun
1997	Nee Varuvolam	Hari's mother
1998	Pranayavarnangal	Aarathi's chitta
1998	Kottaram veettile apputtan	Ambili's mother
1998	Meenathil Thalikettu	Unknown
1999	Janani	Sister Victoria
1999	Aayiram Meni	Velichapad's wife
1999	Angane Oru Avadhikkalathu	Nirmala's mother
2000	Darling Darling	Savithri
2000	Mazha	Patient's mother
2000	Oru Cheru Punchiri	Jaanu
	Thuddikottu	Unknown
2001	Vakkalathu Narayanankutty	Narayanankutty's mother
2002	Kanmashi	Lakshmi
2002	Sesham	Meera's mother
2002	Grandmother	Unknown
2002	Sahodharan Sahadevan	Aarathi's mother
2003	Cheri	Savithri
2003	Paadam Onnu: Oru Vilapam	Rasaq's mother
2005	Bungalvil Outha	Thommichan's wife
2005	Iruvattam Manavaatti	Murali's mother
2006	Eakantham	Velayudhan's mother
2007	Naalu Pennungal	Kumari's mother
2007	Moonamathe Soochi	Balu's mother
2009	Boomi Malayalam	Nirmala's mother
2009	Hailesa	Ulpakshan's mother
2009	Vilapangalkkappuram	Nurse
2009	Decent Parties	Sreeja's mother
2009	Kadha, Samvidhanam Kunchako	Kunchako's mother
2009	Hailesa	Ulpakshan's mother
2009	Gulumaal: The Escape	Jerry's mother
2010	Aagathan	Sarojam
2010	Upadeshiyude Makan	Mariyamma
2010	Punyam Aham	Antharjanam
2010	Kaaryasthan	Shankaran Nair's wife
2011	Note Out	Pavithran's mother
2011	Priyappetta Nattukare	Dasan's mother
2011	Thappana	Mallika's mother
2011	Doctor Love	Yashoda
2012	Masters	Nun
2012	Last Bench	Reji's mother
2012	Vallatha Pahayan	Seithali's wife
2014	Pedithondan	Kannan's mother
2014	On the Way	Manu's mother
2014	Central Theatre	Vinay's mother
2015	Ellam Chettante Istham Pole	Unknown
2015	Ennu Ninte Moideen	Appu's mother
2016	Thoppil Joppan	Roy's mother
2016	Ammavelicham	Maria's mother
2016	Snehasammanam	Sister
2017	Crossroad	Devi's grandmother
2017	Navomi	Mohini's mother
2020	Bhoomiyile Malakhamar'	Rose
2020	Grandma Toy	Meenakshiyamma
2022	King Fish	Navas's mother
2023	2018	Rema

== Television ==
List of Roslin television credits
Year	Series	Role	Channel
2025-present	Mazhathorum Munpe	Soudamini	Asianet
2024	Santhwanam 2	Indiramma	Asianet
2022- 2024	Ennum Sammadham	Sarada	Mazhavil Manorama
2022	Seethapennu	Nalini	Flowers TV
2021- 2023	Sundari	Janaki	Surya TV
2020	Bhoomiyile Malakhamar	Rosa	Goodness (TV channel)
2020	Hridayam Snehasandram	Ponnamma	Mazhavil Manorama
2019-2020	Kathayariyathe	Lalithamma	Flowers TV
2017- 2019	Seetha	Nalini	Flowers TV
2018-2020	Bhramanam	Vimalakumari	Mazhavil Manorama
2018-2020	Sthreepadham	Manoj's mother	Mazhavil Manorama
2017	Karyam Nissaram	Mohanakrishnan's mother	Kairali TV
2016-2017	Ottachilambu	Devamma	Mazhavil Manorama
2016	Krishnathulasi	Appachi	Mazhavil Manorama
2015-2017	Manjurukum Kalam	Vasumathi Amma	Mazhavil Manorama
2014-2016	Karuthamuthu	Nandini	Asianet
2014-2015	Aniyathi		Mazhavil Manorama
2014	Bhagyalakshmi		Surya TV
2013	Nirakoottu		Kairali TV
2012	Amma		Asianet
2012-2013	Ramayanam	Koushalya	Mazhavil Manorama
2012	Malakhamar		Mazhavil Manorama
2012	Nizhalkannadi		Surya TV
2010-2012	Chakravakam		Surya TV
2010	Ponnum Poovum		Amrita TV
2009	Vadakakkoru Hridayam		Amrita TV
2009	Anantham		DD Malayalam
2008	Kanakuyil		Asianet
2007	Velankani Mathavu		Surya TV
2006	Malayogam		Asianet
2006	Swantham Suryaputhri		Asianet
2005	Thanichu		Asianet
2004-2005	Sooryaputhri		Asianet
2004	Alakal		DD Malayalam
2001	Valayam		DD Malayalam
2000	Nizhalukal		Asianet
2000	Anna		DD Malayalam
1999	Moonnam Naal		Asianet
