= Tere Dil Vich Rehan De =

Indian Punjabi television series

- Genre: Drama
- Story by: Laxmi Jaikumar; Vishakha Sharma
- Directed by: Rakesh Vyas
- Creative directors: Saurabh; Deepa; Junaid Choudhary
- Starring: Vandana Singh; Robin Sohi; Balwinder Kaur
- Opening theme: Maaye Ni Maaye Tere Dil Vich Rehan De
- Country of origin: India
- Original language: Punjabi
- No. of episodes: 110

Production
- Executive producer: Daljeet Singh
- Cinematography: Sainath Ravi; Amit Jaiswal
- Editor: Krishna Tiwari
- Camera setup: Multi-camera
- Running time: 22 minutes

Original release
- Network: Zee Punjabi
- Release: 22 November 2021 – 22 April 2022

Related
- America Ammayi

Tere Dil Vich Rehan De (transl. Let me stay in your heart) is a 2021 Indian Punjabi drama television series which aired on Zee Punjabi. It premiered from 22 November 2021 and ended on 22 April 2022. It is directed by Rakesh Vyas of Zee Studios Ltd. and stars Vandana Singh and Robin Sohi in the lead roles. It is an official remake of Zee Telugu TV series America Ammayi.

== Plot ==
Tere Dil Vich Rehan De is a story about a girl, Simart, who was born and brought up in Canada and values Indian traditions and culture. Her mother, Gurleen, was disowned by her parents after she chose to marry a Canadian, Chris, against their wishes.

Gurleen falls ill and wishes to reunite with her family. Simrat takes it upon herself to bring the family together. Simrat tries to fill the gap between her mother, Gurleen and her maternal family, but faces various challenges. She moves in her grandparents' home with a disguised identity. During the course of her stay, she falls in love with her maternal uncle's son, Pukhraj. Her many adventures also include helping her cousin, Preet, marry her loved one, Amreek. After Preet's marriage, Pukhraj and Sam become engaged. Simrat's covert plan is soon exposed.Pukhraj got angry about Sam, Simrat and learn about Sam's mother and Father is Gurleen and Chris. Pukhraj burn Sam's bag and clothes.

== Cast ==
=== Main ===
- Vandana Singh as Simrat Williams Walia aka Sam, Chris and Gurleen's daughter, Pukhraj's cousin and love interest. (2021–2022)
- Robin Sohi as Pukhraj Walia, Gurbash and Baani's son, Maahi's real brother, Simrat's cousin and love interest. (2021–2022)
- Balwinder Kaur Bhagowal as Navjot Walia aka Biji, Gurleen's mother, Simrat's grandmother. (2021–2022)
- Hardeep Kaur Khalsa as Gurleen Walia Williams, Chris's wife, Simrat's mother, Navjot and Jagjit's middle class daughter, Preet, Maahi, Pukhraj and Amandeep's aunty. (2021–2022)

=== Recurring ===
- Ramnik Amandeep Sharma as Harpreet Walia Sharma, Mahinder's wife, Navjot Kaur and Jagjit Singh's oldest daughter, Simrat, Pukhraj, Maahi, Preet and Amandeep's aunty, Gurbash, Paramjeet and Gurleen's elder sister. (2022)
- Gavie Luthra as Mahinder Sharma as Villain, Harpreet's husband, Navjot Walia and Jagjit Walia's son in law, Simrat, Pukhraj, Maahi, Preet and Amandeep's uncle, Gurbash, Paramjeet and Gurleen 's brother in law, who murdered his father in law Jagjit Walia and wanted to marry Gurleen. (2022)
- Jassi Saggu as Gurbash Walia, Navjot Walia and Jagjit Walia's oldest son, Preet and Amandeep's uncle, Pukhraj and Maahi's father, Baani's husband, Harpreet, Paramjeet and Gurleen's first elder brother, Simrat's uncle and later became father in law. (2021–2022)
- Manu Dhanjal as Baani Walia, Maahi and Pukhraj's mother, Gurbash's wife, Gurleen's sister in law, Navjot and Jagjit's daughter in law, Sam's aunty and later became mother in law. (2021–2022)
- Himanshu Gandhi as Amandeep Walia, Lovely and Param's son, Preet's real brother. (2021–2022)
- Guneet Sharma as Amreek, Preet's love interest. (2021–2022)
- Preeti Arora Jain as Amreek's mother, Preet's mother in law. (2021-2022)
- Preety Pari as Lovely Walia, Amandeep and Preet's mother, Navjot and Jagjit's second daughter in law, Param's wife, Gurleen's sister in law. (2021–2022)
- Sunny Prabhakar as Paramjit Walia, Amandeep and Preet's father, Navjot and Jagjit's second son, Lovely's husband, Harpreet, Gurleen's second real brother, Gurbash's younger brother. (2021–2022)
- Rajbeer Singh Sidhu as Unknown, Manoj's fake mother, who was becoming Preet's fake mother in law and but plan failed, suddenly arrested to Unknown and Manoj by police because Sam reveals Manoj killed his mother, he will marry to Preet and ruin her life and kill Preet, he will go to Canada with his fake mother and Preet to kill both. (2022)

== Adaptations ==
Language	Title	Original release	Network(s)	Last aired	Notes
Telugu	America Ammayi అమెరికా అమ్మాయి	27 July 2015	Zee Telugu	21 July 2018	Original
Tamil	Suryavamsam சூர்யவம்சம்	21 September 2020	Zee Tamil	21 August 2021	Remake
Punjabi	Tere Dil Vich Rehan De ਤੇਰੇ ਦਿਲ ਵਿੱਚ ਰਹਿਣ ਦੇ	22 November 2021	Zee Punjabi	22 April 2022	Remake
