= Nikitha Rajesh =

Indian actress

- Occupation: Actress
- Years active: 2005–present
- Known for: Manjurukum Kalam; Malli

Nikitha Rajesh is an Indian actress and former child artist who works in Malayalam and Tamil television. She began her career as a child actor in Omanathinkal Pakshi (2005-06) and gained recognition for her role as Jaanikutty in Manjurukum Kalam (2015-16).

== Early life ==
Nikitha was born in Thiruvananthapuram, Kerala. Her father, Rajesh, is a television serial director, and her mother, Chithra, is employed in the Forest Department. She attended Saraswathi Vidyalaya in Vattiyoorkavu, Thiruvananthapuram.

== Career ==
Nikitha made her debut at the age of 3 in the Asianet serial Omanathinkal Pakshi, playing Annamol. She subsequently appeared in numerous Malayalam television projects as a child artist, including mythological series Devimahathmyam, Rahasyam, Sasneham, Sree Guruvayoorappan and Junior Chanakyan. She also appeared as a child artist in films including Colours, Kanyakumari Express and Aakasmikam. She gained recognition for her portrayal of Janikutty in Manjurukum Kalam.

In 2019, she transitioned into the Tamil television with the supernatural drama Arundhathi on Sun TV.. In 2020, she was cast as the lead protagonist "Samantha" in the Zee Tamil series Suryavamsam, starring alongside Poornima Bhagyaraj. In 2024, she returned to Sun TV to play the titular lead role in Malli. She returned to Malayalam television in 2025 through Mazha Thorum Munpe, marking her third collaboration with writer Joycee.

== Filmography ==
=== Television ===
Year	Title	Role	Language	Channel	Notes	Ref.
2005-06	Omanathinkal Pakshi	Annamol	Malayalam	Asianet	Debut as child artist	
2006-2007	Swantham Suryaputhri	Nandana	Malayalam	Asianet		
2007-2008	Sree Guruvayoorappan		Malayalam	Surya TV		
2007-2009	Rahasyam	Kanthimol	Malayalam	Asianet		
2008-2009	Priyamanasi		Malayalam	Surya TV		
2009	Velankanni Mathavu		Malayalam	Surya TV		
2009	Sreemahabhagavatham		Malayalam	Asianet		
2009	Sasneham		Malayalam	DD Malayalam		
2009–2010	Devimahathmyam	Meenakshi	Malayalam	Asianet		
2010	Mattoruval		Malayalam	Surya TV		
2010	Swamiye Saranamayyappa		Malayalam	Surya TV		
2011	Manjuthirum Munpe		Malayalam	DD Malayalam		
2011-12	Alavudinte Albutha Vilakku	Jasmine	Malayalam	Asianet		
2011	Amma		Malayalam	Asianet		
2012	Malakhamar		Malayalam	Mazhavil Manorama		
2013	Ulkkadal		Malayalam	Kairali TV		
2013	Butterflies		Malayalam	Surya TV		
2015	Junior Chanakyan		Malayalam	Flowers TV		
2015–2016	Manjurukum Kalam	Teenage Jaanikutty	Malayalam	Mazhavil Manorama	Main Role	
2019	Arundhathi	Deivanai Shanmugam	Tamil	Sun TV		
2020–2021	Suryavamsam	Samantha (Sam)	Tamil	Zee Tamil		
2021	Neethane Enthan Ponvasantham	Samantha	Tamil	Zee Tamil	Mahasangamam (Crossover)	
2024–present	Malli	Malliga (Malli)	Tamil	Sun TV		
2025–present	Mazhathorum Munpe	Aleena	Malayalam	Asianet		

=== Films ===
Year	Title	Role	Language	Notes	Ref.
2009	Ee Pattanathil Bhootham	Child artist	Malayalam		
2009	Colours	Young Pinky	Malayalam		
2010	Kanyakumari Express	Mohan's daughter	Malayalam		
2010	Avan	Child artist	Malayalam		
2012	Aakasmikam	Pratibha (Madhupal's daughter)	Malayalam		

== Awards ==
Year	Award	Category	Work	Result	Ref.
2025	She Tamil Nakshatram Awards	Best Actress (Television)	Malli	Won	
2025	Sun Kudumbam Viruthugal	Sirandha Sagothari (Best Sister)	Malli	Won	
2025	Asianet Television Awards	Best Star Pair (Along with Rahul Suresh)	Mazha Thorum Munpe	Won	
