= Ennu Swantham Koottukari =

Television series

- Genre: Drama
- Story by: K.K. Sudhakaran
- Directed by: Rajesh Kannankara
- Starring: Janani; Soumya; Nila Raj
- Theme music composer: Jassie Gift(composer); Sithara Krishnakumar(Singer)
- Country of origin: India
- Original language: Malayalam
- No. of seasons: 1
- No. of episodes: 158

Production
- Producer: P. Anil Kumar
- Cinematography: Priyan
- Editor: P.N.Ajit
- Camera setup: Multi-camera
- Running time: 22 minutes approx.
- Production company: MJ Productions

Original release
- Network: Mazhavil Manorama
- Release: 1 December 2014 – 10 July 2015

Ennu Swantham Koottukari is an Indian Malayalam television series which launched on Mazhavil Manorama. Janani, Soumya and Nila Raj play the lead roles in the series. The show telecasted its final episode on 10 July 2015 & got replaced by a new series, Vivahitha.

== Synopsis ==
The story revolves around the life and family of three lady friends, Ammu, Shwetha & Shamna. These three firm friends studied in the same college. The story highlights the life of these three friends, their relationships, their family.

== Cast ==
=== Lead cast ===
- Janani as Ammu
- Soumya as Shamna
- Nila Raj as Shwetha
- Architha as Charulatha
- Dr.Sudheendran as Prof.Arun kumar
- Pratheesh Nandha as Sanju

=== Supporting cast ===
- Beena Antony as Adv.Shivaranjini
- Tony as Menon
- Binil Khader as Dr.Sujith
- Rajendran as Unnithan S.I
- Anushree as Sabeena
- Pria Menon as Roshni Chandran
- Omana Ouseph as Swamini amma
- Sharath Swamy
- Saji Palamel
- Seena as Remya
- Pratheeksha G Pradeep
- Pavithra
- Lekshmi priya
- Ayisha Rani as Doctor
- Najim Arshad
