= Vaishnavi Saikumar =

Indian actress

- Born: Kollam, Kerala
- Occupation: Actress
- Years active: 2020–present
- Spouse: Sujith Kumar (m. 2018)
- Parent: Saikumar (father)
- Relatives: Kottarakkara Sreedharan Nair (grandfather); Shobha Mohan (aunt); Vinu Mohan (cousin); Anu Mohan (cousin)

Vaishnavi Saikumar is an Indian actress who works in Malayalam television.

== Personal life ==
Vaishnavi is the granddaughter of Kottarakkara Sreedharan Nair. Her father is the veteran Malayalam actor Saikumar, and her mother, Prasanna Kumari, is a singer and former actress.

She married Sujith Kumar on June 17, 2018, in a ceremony held in Kollam.

== Career ==
Vaishnavi made her acting debut in 2020 with the Zee Keralam series Kaiyethum Doorath, where she portrayed the antagonist Kanaka Durga. She later appeared as Ranjitha in the long-running series Kudumbavilakku on Asianet.

In July 2024, she was announced as part of the cast of the Flowers TV series Panchagni. The following year, she joined Asianet series Mazha Thorum Munpe, an adaptation of Joycee’s novel, playing the role of Vyjayanthi.

Vaishnavi expanded into cinema in 2025 with her feature film debut in the thriller Kalamkaval, co-starring Mammootty and Vinayakan.

== Filmography ==
=== Films ===
Year	Title	Role	Notes	Ref
2025	Kalamkaval	Anagha	Debut	

=== Television ===
Year	Title	Role	Channel	Notes	Ref.
2020–2023	Kaiyethum Doorath	Kanaka Durga	Zee Keralam	Television debut	
2022	Ammayariyathe	Dr. Reena	Asianet		
2023	Manimuthu	Neetha	Mazhavil Manorama		
2023–2024	Kudumbavilakku	Ranjitha	Asianet		
2024–2025	Panchagni	Kalavathi	Flowers TV		
2025–present	Mazhathorum Munpe	Vyjayanthi	Asianet		
2026–present	Kanakam Kamini Kalaham	Sharika	Kaumudy TV		

==== Special appearances ====
- 2022- Flowers Oru Kodi (Flowers TV)
- 2024- Sukhamo Devi as Kalavathi (Flowers)
- 2020- Neeyum Njanum (Zee Keralam)
- 2024 - Flowers Oru Kodi with Comedy (Flowers)
- 2026 - Maanathe Kottaram (Zee Keralam)

== Awards ==
Year	Award	Category	Work	Result	Ref.
2026	Asianet Television Awards	Best Supporting Actress	Mazha Thorum Munpe	Nominated	
2026	Asianet Television Awards	Popular Character Actress	Mazha Thorum Munpe	Won	
2026	Kerala Vision Television Awards	Outstanding Performer	Mazha Thorum Munpe	Won	
