= Lintu Rony =

Indian actress

- Born: Lintu Thomas
- Other names: Nila Raj
- Occupation: Actress
- Years active: 2011–2021
- Spouse: Rony Eappen Mathew (m. 2014)
- Children: 1

Lintu Rony (née Thomas), previously credited as Nila Raj, is an Indian former actress who appears in South Indian films and TV serials. She is known for her role in the television series Bharya.

== Career ==
In 2014, she played one of the leads in the television series Ennu Swantham Koottukari on Mazhavil Manorama. She has since starred in Eeran Nilavu on Flowers and in Bharya on Asianet. In Bharya, she plays a Muslim girl named Rehana. In 2016, she played one of the three heroines in Out of Range. In 2015, she played one of the two heroines in Ond Chance Kodi, which marks her Kannada debut. She has acted in over 30 Malayalam language films. She also has garnered praise for her videos on TikTok. She played a role in 2021 Tamil movie Master. She received criticism for posting reels during the 2024 Wayanad landslides.

== Personal life ==
She is a Malayali from Nilambur. She has a brother, who died, and a sister. She is married to Rony Eippen Mathew, a technical consultant in London. In June 2023, their son was born.

== Filmography ==
=== Films ===
- All films are in Malayalam, unless otherwise noted.

Year	Film	Role	Notes
2011	Vaadamalli	Vrindha's friend	
2012	Track	Aishwarya's friend	
2012	Ezham Suryan	Muthu	
2012	Manthrikan	Malu's friend	
2013	Good Bad & Ugly	Shyama	
2013	For Sale	Karthika	
2015	Ond Chance Kodi	Nithya	Kannada film; credited as Linto
2015	Wonderful Journey		
2015	Aashamsakalode Anna	Lakshmi	
2016	Out of Range	Hazeena	
2016	Zero	Priya's mother	Tamil film
2017	Chunkzz	Riya's sister	
2017	Adam Joan	Church attender	
2019	Mr. Pavanayi 99.99	Sophiya	
2021	Master	Professor	Tamil film

=== Television ===
Year	Show	Role	Channel	Notes
2013	Star Hunt	Participant	Kairali TV	
2013	Action Killadi	Anchor	Kairali TV	
2014	Meendum Varuven		Sun TV	Tamil serial
2014-2015	Ennu Swantham Koottukari	Shwetha	Mazhavil Manorama	
2016-2017	Kayamkulam Kochunniyude Makan		Surya TV	
2017	Eeran Nilavu	Supriya	Flowers TV	
2018-2019	Bharya	Rehana	Asianet	
2018	Annie's Kitchen	Guest	Amrita TV	Appears in the episode "Annie's Kitchen with Ronson and Lintu"
2018	Page 3	Model	Kappa TV	
	Ashwamedham	Contestant	Kairali TV	
2019	Thakkarpan Comedy	Contestant	Mazhavil Manorama	

=== Music videos ===
Title	Year	Performer(s)	Ref.
"One Love"	2013	Vijay Madhav	
