= Maharani (2009 TV series) =

Indian television series

- Also known as: Queen
- Genre: Soap opera
- Screenplay by: Baiju Deveraj
- Directed by: Baiju Deveraj
- Starring: Sujitha; Archana Suseelan; Praveena; Sulakshana
- Opening theme: Maharani
- Country of origin: India
- Original language: Tamil
- No. of seasons: 1
- No. of episodes: 492

Production
- Producer: Baiju Deveraj
- Camera setup: Multi-camera
- Running time: approx. 20-22 minutes per episode
- Production company: Sandra`s Communication

Original release
- Network: Vijay TV
- Release: 19 October 2009 – 4 November 2011

Maharani is a 2009 soap opera that aired Monday through Friday on Vijay TV from 19 October 2009 to 4 November 2011 for 492 episodes. It is a remake of the Malayalam language serial Ente Manasaputhri that was aired on Asianet.

This is a story of two best friends (played by Sujitha and Archana) who turn out to be enemies. The show starred Sujitha, Archana, Praveena and Sulakshana among others. It was directed by Baiju Devaraj.

== Plot ==
Maharani is a story of two young girls named Mahalakshmi (Sujitha) and Rani (Archana) who are brought up in an orphanage. Maha is calm, shy and a very simple person. Whereas Rani is smart and tries to outwit others with her villainous plots. The orphanage follows a certain system, where for all those who attain 18 years of age will be married to some suitable persons. Such an initiative is always taken by the orphanage owners for every person belonging to the orphanage. Rani always dreams of a very luxurious and luminous life in the outside world. Maha with her simplicity and clear focus in life tries to overcome all her problems independently! But will she tackle more issues created by Rani too?

== Cast ==
- Sujitha as Mahalakshmi (Maha)
- Archana Suseelan as Rani
- Praveena as Sandhya
- Sulakshana as Yamuna
- Sreenath / Murali Mohan as Devraj
- Sathish as Prakash
- M. B. Padmakumar as Thopiyas
- Chitra Shenoy as Prakash's mother
- Arya Rohit as Suja
- Katam Reddy
- Srilekha
- Sreekala as Servant

== Adaptations ==
Language	Title	Original release	Network(s)	Last aired	Notes
Malayalam	Ente Manasaputhri എന്റെ മാനസപുത്രി	16 July 2007	Asianet	21 May 2010	Original
Tamil	Maharani மகாராணி	19 October 2009	Star Vijay	4 November 2011	Remake
