= Ond Chance Kodi =

- Theatrical release poster
- Directed by: Sathyamithra
- Produced by: R.M.Sunil Kumar
- Starring: Ravishankar Gowda; Patre Ajith; Linto; Shruti
- Cinematography: Mathew Rajan
- Music by: Mysore Gopi
- Release date: 23 January 2015
- Running time: 142 minutes
- Country: India
- Language: Kannada

Ond Chance Kodi (transl. Give me a chance) is a 2015 Kannada-language comedy film Produced by Dr Sunilkumar R M directed by Sathyamitra. The film stars Ravishankar Gowda, Patre Ajith, debutante Linto and Shruti. The film was a remake of Malayalam film Best of Luck (2010) which was loosely based on the Hindi film All The Best (2009) which was an adaptation of the Marathi play Pati Sagle Uchapati which in turn was based on the English comedy play Right Bed Wrong Husband. While the Marathi play was adapted into Kannada earlier as Housefull, the Tamil adaptation of the English play titled Thikku Theriyatha Veettil was made into a Tamil movie Veettuku Veedu which was remade in Kannada earlier as Galate Samsara - thus making this the third Kannada on-screen adaptation of the original play.

Ond Chance Kodi features music by Mysore Gopi. The film was launched on 20 August 2013 in Bangalore and commenced filming that same month. The film was shot in Chikmagalur, Goa and Wayanad.

== Cast ==
- Ravishankar Gowda as Nakula
- Patre Ajth as Shukla
- Linto as Nithya
- Shruti as Tavare
- B. C. Patil as Vinayaka Patil
- Dr. Nandini
- Tennis Krishna
- Sadhu Kokila
- M. S. Umesh
- Mandeep Roy
- Honnavalli Krishna

== Soundtrack ==
No.	Title	Lyrics	Singer(s)	Length
1.	"Aagumbe Sanjeya"		Rajesh Krishnan, Anuradha Bhat
2.	"Enne Mujaane"		Rajesh Krishnan
3.	"Gelluve Gelluve"	Roopa Iyer	Hemanth, Chorus
4.	"Haaduva Premaraagadali"	V. Nagendra Prasad	Santosh

== Release ==
The Times of India gave the film two-and-a-half out of five stars and wrote that "Though sprinkled with humour, this remake of Malayalam movie Best of Luck fails to impress as the script is weak".
