= Maareesan =

2025 Tamil film by Sudheesh Sankar

- Theatrical release poster
- Directed by: Sudheesh Sankar
- Written by: V. Krishna Moorthy
- Produced by: R. B. Choudary
- Starring: Vadivelu; Fahadh Faasil
- Cinematography: Kalaiselvan Sivaji
- Edited by: Sreejith Sarang
- Music by: Yuvan Shankar Raja
- Production company: Super Good Films
- Distributed by: Romeo Pictures
- Release date: 25 July 2025
- Running time: 152 minutes
- Country: India
- Language: Tamil

Maareesan (transl. Maricha or figuratively, imposter) is a 2025 Indian Tamil-language drama thriller film directed by Sudheesh Sankar, written by V. Krishna Moorthy, and produced by R. B. Choudary for Super Good Films. It stars Vadivelu and Fahadh Faasil. The film's music was composed by Yuvan Shankar Raja.

Maareesan was released in theatres on 25 July 2025. The film received positive reviews from critics and audience.

== Plot ==
Dhayalan "Dhaya" is a petty thief who has been arrested multiple times but never changes his ways. After being released from Palayamkottai prison following his latest theft, he immediately steals a motorcycle and breaks into a house in Kanyakumari. Inside, he finds an old man, Velayudham Pillai "Velan", chained to a window. To Dhaya's surprise, Velan is not alarmed but warmly calls him “Kumar.” Confused, Dhaya warns him to stay quiet while he searches for valuables.

Realizing Dhaya is not Kumar, Velan explains that he has Alzheimer's disease and his son Kumar locks him up daily before leaving for work to prevent him from wandering off. Velan tells Dhaya there is nothing valuable in the house, but offers him ₹25,000 from his bank account if he releases him. Dhaya agrees, and they go to a nearby ATM. When Dhaya notices Velan's account holds 25 lakh rupees, he decides to exploit him further. Even after receiving the promised money, Dhaya stays with Velan under various pretexts. The two embark on a road trip to Tiruvannamalai to meet Velan's brother-in-law. Along the way, Velan's memory lapses often cause him to mistake Dhaya for Kumar.

Dhaya contacts his crime partner “Network” Ganesh, who lives in Erode. Ganesh suggests that Dhaya photograph Velan's ATM cards to duplicate them and obtain the PIN codes. Winning Velan's trust proves difficult, as even Velan struggles to remember the codes. Dhaya begins to act like a friend, accompanying Velan to different places, and a bond slowly develops between them. Meanwhile, police investigate a murder in the house where Dhaya first encountered Velan. The crime appears linked to a serial killer who lures victims with phone calls and switches off the device after each murder. Authorities begin monitoring the phone's activity.

Later, Ganesh joins Dhaya and Velan at a party in Salem. Velan spikes their drinks, rendering them unconscious. That same night, the serial killer's phone reactivates, and the police trace it to Velan, who calls Siva Selvam, a corrupt schoolteacher, to demand a meeting. Velan confronts Siva about sexually exploiting his underage students and kills him. Before dying, Siva admits he has a partner named Arun and provides Velan with his number. By the time the police arrive, Siva is already dead, and no other clues are found.

A flashback reveals that Velan's wife Meenakshi was a child psychologist who counseled troubled children. During her work, she discovered that several girls had been abused but were too afraid to confide in their parents or the police. Meenakshi gathered evidence and filed a case, but her Alzheimer's symptoms left her unable to testify coherently in court, leading to the case's dismissal. Distraught, she committed suicide. Heartbroken, Velan vowed to avenge the victims, using her diary of abusers to track and kill them. It is also revealed that Velan does not have Alzheimer's or memory issues. He has been feigning memory loss, imitating his wife's condition to cover his actions.

In the present day, Velan and Dhaya visit Dhaya's mother at his native village in Salem before leaving for Palakkad to visit Velan's adopted daughter Krishnaveni. During their halt in Coimbatore, Dhaya discovers a stash of SIM cards in Velan's wallet, which makes him suspicious. Checking Velan's phone, Dhaya finds Velan's messages to Arun asking for underage girls. Unaware that this is Velan's plan to lure Arun out, Dhaya misunderstands the situation and assumes Velan himself is a pedophile. He follows Velan after pretending to fall asleep, only to find Velan waiting for Arun at a location where they shared. No one shows up, and a disappointed Velan returns to his room. Dhaya witnesses everything and confides it to Ganesh.

Dhaya and Ganesh plot to kill Velan at Ganesh's farmhouse in Coimbatore. They invite him under the pretence of a party. On the way, Velan realizes the car they are traveling in has the same hanging decor as was in “Arun's" contact profile picture. Velan remembers seeing the same model car the day before while waiting for Arun to show up. Putting two and two together, Velan realises Arun is Ganesh and confronts him at the farmhouse. A fight breaks out, and Ganesh easily overpowers Velan until Dhaya arrives. Having learned the truth, Dhaya sides with Velan, and together, they kill Ganesh.

In the final reveal, it is shown that Dhaya delivered the fatal blow, but Velan takes the blame. The scene where Dhaya first saw Velan, where Velan was chained to the window, also has nothing to do with Kumar or Alzheimer's. Velan was after his first target, a former jail warden turned pedophile, and got handcuffed by him in a struggle, but managed to kill him with the chain. When he saw Dhaya approaching, he started his ruse with Dhaya's help.

== Cast ==
- Vadivelu as Velayudham Pillai “Velan”
- Fahadh Faasil as Dhayalan “Dhaya”
- Sithara as Dr. Meenakshi, Velan's wife and a NGO based child psychologist
- Kovai Sarala as DCP Fareeda Begum IPS
- Livingston as Chaari, Velan's brother-in-law
- Renuka as Shanthi, Dhayalan's mother
- Vivek Prasanna as “Network” Ganesh (Arun)
- P. L. Thenappan as Inspector Kanagaraj
- Five Star Krishna as Siva Selvam, a teacher
- Saravana Subbiah as Judge
- Haritha Mutharasan as Sangeetha, Madhumitha’s mother
- Ram Kalaitharan as Prison Warden
- Agathiyan as Theft Phone Owner
- Siva Balan as Business Guy
- Vaishak Pavanan as Showroom Sale Representative
- Sivaganesan as ATM Security Guard
- Jai Krishna as Nagercoil Head Constable
- Kadugu Ramamoorthy as Bus Person
- Telephone Raja as Farmer
- Mariyappan as Petti Shop Owner
- Tiruppur Mohan as Local Councillor
- Aarumugam as SI Kaviyarasu
- Sahayaraj as Constable
- Gurumoorthi as Biriyani Shop Man
- Selvaraj as Hotel Owner
- Durairaj Singaram as Waiter
- Dhaya as Mechanic Giri
- Pugalendhi as Gambling Head
- S. Rajapandi as Parotta Shop Owner
- Shivakumar as Ashramam Staff member
- Srinivasan as Sridhar, textile owner
- Nivedha Velmurugan as Textile Receptionist
- Ajesh Babu as Manager
- John Felix Kennedy as Manager
- Jegan as Inspector
- Prabhakar as Manickam's neighbor
- Sharmila as Fareeda's daughter
- Pradeep Raj as SI Michael
- Movisha as Amudha
- Madhumita as Madhumita
- Guru Lakshmanan as Kumar
- Vaidehi Amarnath as a dancer in the song "Nethu Oruthara" (Cameo Appearance)

== Production ==
After the success of Maamannan (2023), Fahadh Faasil and Vadivelu were rumoured to collaborate in another project produced by R. B. Choudary's Super Good Films, while the yet-to-be-titled film's cast and crew were not revealed. On 1 January 2024, Super Good Films officially announced their 98th project with Fahadh and Vadivelu in the lead roles and to be directed by Sudheesh Sankar. In late-January 2024, the title of the film, Maareesan was released. The technical team consists of music composer Yuvan Shankar Raja, cinematographer Kalaiselvan Sivaji and editor Sreejith Sarang.

The film reunites Vadivelu and Kovai Sarala following their collaboration in Mersal (2017), directed by Atlee. Apart from the lead cast, the film also features Vivek Prasanna, Sithara, P. L. Thenappan, Livingston, Renuka, Saravana Subbiah, Krishna, Haritha, and Telephone Raja in supporting roles.

Principal photography began on 22 January 2024. In early-April 2024, it was reported that about 50% of the filming had been completed and will resume once Fahadh completes his portions for Pushpa 2: The Rule (2024). The next schedule began on 24 October 2024 in Chennai.

== Music ==
Maareesan

Soundtrack album by Yuvan Shankar Raja
- Released: July 31, 2025
- Genre: Feature film soundtrack
- Length: 9:37
- Language: Tamil
- Label: Saregama
- Producer: Yuvan Shankar Raja

Yuvan Shankar Raja chronology
Paranthu Po (2025)	Maareesan (2025)	Mr Zoo Keeper (2025)

Singles from Maareesan
- 1. "FaFa Song" Released: 9 July 2025; 2. "Maareesa" Released: 19 July 2025

The film has soundtrack and background composed by Yuvan Shankar Raja. The first single "FaFa Song" was released on 9 July 2025. The second single "Maareesa" was released on 19 July 2025.

Track listing
No.	Title	Lyrics	Singer(s)	Length
1.	"FaFa Song"	Madhan Karky	Mathichiyam Bala	3:29
2.	"Maareesa"	Sabarivasan Shanmugam	Yuvan Shankar Raja	3:18
3.	"Ore Oru"	Madhan Karky	Yuvan Shankar Raja, Vadivelu	2:44
4.	"Theme of Maareesan"			1:05

In addition to the above tracks, the song "Nethu Oruthara" composed by Yuvan Shankar Raja's father Ilaiyaraaja for the 1990 film Puthu Paatu was remastered and reused in the film.

== Release ==
=== Theatrical ===
Maareesan was released in theatres on 25 July 2025, along with Thalaivan Thalaivii. The teaser of the film having Vadivelu and Fahadh embarking on a road journey through different landscapes, with them singing "Aaha Inba Nilavinile" from the film Mayabazar (1957) was released on 4 June 2025.

=== Home media ===
The film began streaming on Netflix from 22 August 2025.

== Reception ==
Abhinav Subramanian of The Times of India gave 3.5/5 stars and wrote "Maareesan works best when it lets its contradictions breathe - two criminals finding kinship in their damaged moral compasses, each justifying their crimes through different lenses." Janani K of India Today gave 3/5 stars and wrote "'Maareesan' is a comedy thriller that can make you smile, hold you on the edge of your seats and support the morally flawed characters. If we look past the convenient writing, especially with the flashback and post-intermission, there’s a lot to love in 'Maareesan'."

Prashanth Vallavan of Cinema Express gave 2/5 stars and wrote "Maareesan is pregnant with premises of two perfectly engaging yet tonally different films, which could have worked on their own. The unfortunate chimera we did end up with serves only to show what happens when filmmaking overpowers storytelling, when the need to accentuate drama, the fixation on conforming to screenplay structures, and the hyper-awareness of genre tropes all come in the way of a story." Srinivasa Ramanujam of The Hindu wrote "While the first half is a slow burn, reminiscent of many Malayalam films for its pace and sweet nothing-ness, an arresting interval block sets things up nicely for a thriller. [...] Maareesan explores this aspect in good measure by taking up a protagonist who has dementia. That itself is a triumph — because forgetfulness is a big ordeal." Rajagopalan Venkataraman of Khaleej Times wrote that "The second half ditches everything it had built in the first half and goes in for a different tone. You’d be forgiven for rubbing your eyes and wondering if you entered the wrong theatre. It shifts gears, yes, but that feels too abrupt."
