= Kanyakumari Express (film) =

- Film poster
- Directed by: T.S.Suresh Babu
- Written by: Dennis Joseph
- Produced by: G. S. Murali
- Starring: Suresh Gopi; Gowri Nandha; Nikitha Rajesh; Lena; Sarayu; Babu Antony
- Cinematography: U. K. Senthil Kumar
- Music by: Sharath
- Release date: 19 November 2010
- Country: India
- Language: Malayalam

Kanyakumari Express is a 2010 Indian Malayalam-language police procedural thriller film directed by T. S. Suresh Babu and written by Dennis Joseph. The film stars Suresh Gopi, Babu Antony, Gowri Nandha, Nikitha Rajesh and Lena as the heroine.

== Premise ==
Kanyakumari Express revolves around DIG Mohan Shankar, who loses his wife Sneha and daughter in an accident made by a group of enemies, where he shifts his job to Special Branch. With change in his duty, Mohan Shankar is welcomed by some politicians, but he is actually working undercover and also does research on the temples of Kerala and Nanchinad. During this period, the politicians begin to die mysteriously and the CM Keshavan Nambiar misunderstands Mohan Shankar for the killings. With this, Mohan Shankar begins to investigate the murders.

== Cast ==
- Suresh Gopi as DIG Mohan Shankar IPS, later IG
- Babu Antony as Ranjan Philip
- Jagathy Sreekumar as Chief Minister Keshavan Nambiar
- Gowri Nandha as Hanna John
- Lena as Sneha
- Shanavas as Satharam Sethu
- Maneesh Krishna as Arjun Satharam
- Bheeman Raghu as DGP Raghuram IPS
- Baiju Santhosh as SI Stephen Varghese
- Kanakalatha as Meera Bhai
- Sarayu as Hema
- Dinesh Panicker as Adv. John
- Krishna as Ajay Nambiar
- Kiran Raj as Rasheed Mooppan
- Tosh Christy as Alex
- Sabu Varghese as Rajashekharan
- Achu as Achu
- Sudheer Sukumaran as DSP Tirunelveli Muthuvel
- Urmila Unni - Cameo Appearance
- Kottayam Nazeer - Cameo Appearance
- Rajmohan Unnithan as Law Minister Cameo Appearance
- Nikitha Rajesh as Mohan's daughter
