= Archana Suseelan =

Indian actress

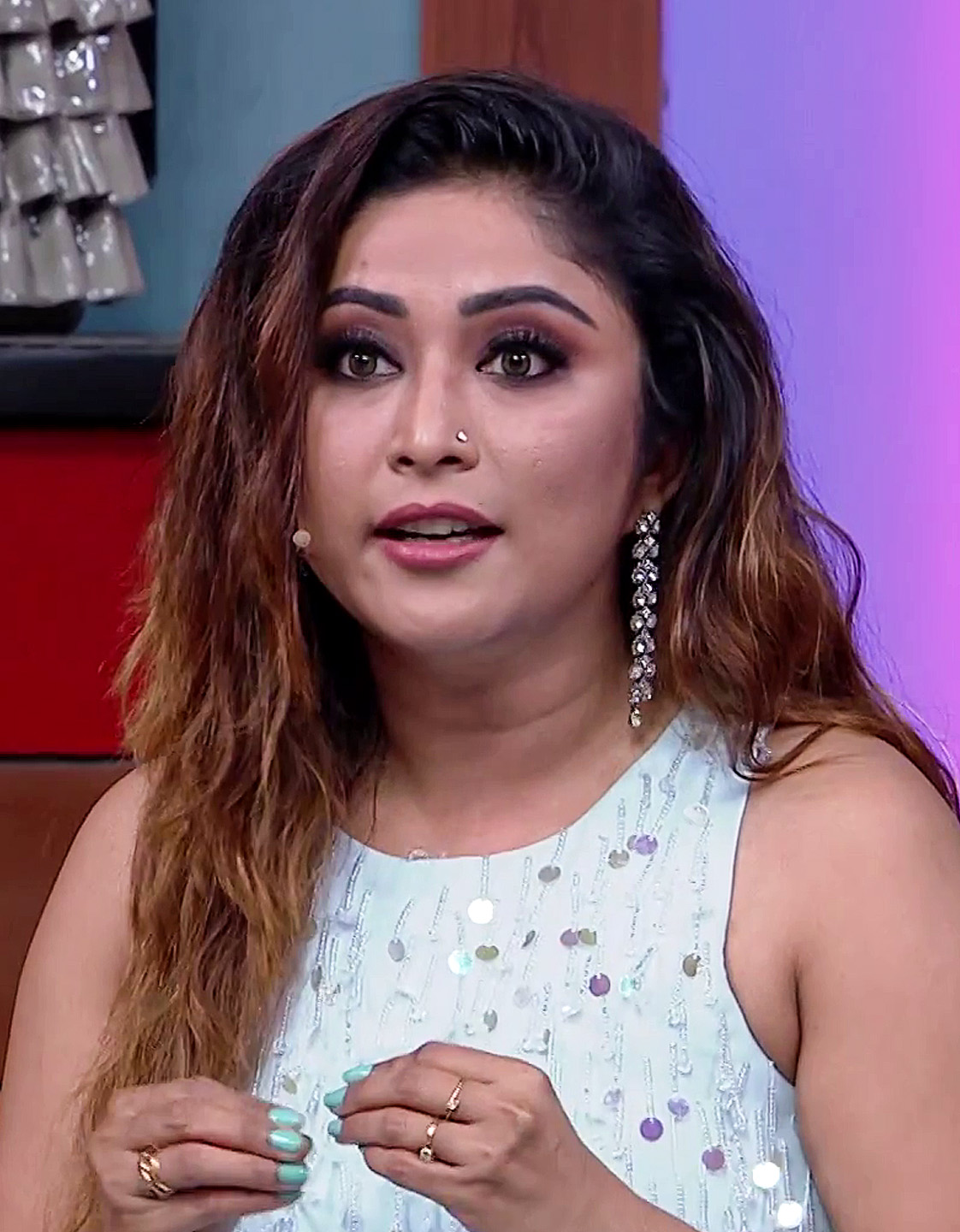
- Archana in 2019
- Born: Bhilai, Chhattisgarh, India
- Occupations: Model; actress; video jockey; dancer; entrepreneur
- Years active: 2004–2021

Archana Suseelan is an Indian actress who predominantly works in the Malayalam and Tamil television industry.

== Personal life and career ==
Archana born to Malayali father and Nepali mother.

Archana came into limelight and became popular for her role as Gloria in the television series Ente Manasaputhri which aired on Asianet channel. She was also seen in several television serials in both Tamil and Malayalam languages. She is settled at Thiruvananthapuram with her family. She also runs a restaurant.

== Television ==
=== Television soap operas ===
Year	Serial	Role	Channel	Notes
2005	Mandrake		Asianet	
2006	Kanakkinavu	–	Surya TV	Debut
2007	Punarjanmam	Glory	Surya TV	
2007–2010	Ente Manasaputhri	Glory	Asianet	Sequel to Punarjanmam
2009–2011	Maharani	Rani	Star Vijay	Tamil Serial
2010-2011	Snehatheeram		Surya TV	
2011–2012	Amma	Mallika	Asianet	
2011-2013	Ammakili	Devika	Asianet	
2011-2014	Ilavarasi	Pooja/Narmadha	Sun TV	Tamil Serial
2013	Geethanjali	Chithrasena	Surya TV	
2013	Pathinu Pathu		Surya TV	
2013	Nirakoottu		Kairali TV	
2013	Nirapakittu		Media One	Sequel to Nirakoottu
2013	Kumkumapottu			
2013	Ival Yamuna	Yamuna	Mazhavil Manorama	Replaced Anjana Haridas
2014–2017	Karuthamuthu	Mareena	Asianet	
2015	Durga	Malavika	Janam TV	
2015	Snehasangamam		Surya TV	
2015	Vazhve Maayam	Priya	DD Malayalam	
2015	Kenal Sasiyude Onam		Asianet	Telefilm
2015–2016	Ponnambili	Bhairavi	Mazhavil Manorama	
2016–2017	5 Star Thattukada Season 2	Nancy	Asianet Plus	
2017	Sathyam Sivam Sundaram	Shivakami	Amrita TV	
2017–2018	Mamangam	Arundathi	Flowers TV	
2019–2020	Sabarimala Swami Ayyappan	Mahishi	Asianet	
2019	Ennu Swantham Jani	Emily	Surya TV	
2019 - 2020	Seetha Kalyanam	Sravani Siagal / Sangeetha	Asianet	
2020	Swathi Nakshatram Chothi	Veda	Zee Keralam	Replaced Anjali Rao
2020	Chackoyum Maryyum	Jenny	Mazhavil Manorama	
2020–2021	Paadatha Painkilli	Swapna	Asianet	Replaced Preetha Pradeep; Replaced by Amritha Varnan
2023	Malikappuram: Apathbandhavan Ayyappan	Mahishi	Asianet	Archived from Sabarimala Swami Ayyappan

=== TV shows ===
Year	Program	Role	TV Channel	Note
2005	Post Box	Host	Kiran TV	Television debut
2015	Ningalkkum Aakaam Kodeeshwaran	Herself as contestant	Asianet	With Arya Rohit
2017–2018	Dare The Fear	Herself as contestant	Asianet	Top3
2018	Bigg Boss Malayalam 1	Herself as contestant	Asianet	Top 7
2020	Surya Jodi No.1	Herself as contestant	Surya TV	Paired with Aneesh Rahman

== Filmography ==
Year	Film	Role	Language
2004	Rain Rain Come Again	College student	Malayalam
2006	Lanka	Kokila	Malayalam
2007	Tholaipesi	Unknown	Tamil
2008	Sultan	Janet Rose	Malayalam
2008	Paribhavam	Adv. Merlin	Malayalam
2009	De Dana Dan	Hotel receptionist	Hindi
2010	Kaaryasthan	Herself (Cameo appearance)	Malayalam
2010	Bumm Bumm Bole	Bubhoni	Hindi
2012	Kochi	Rani	Malayalam
2012	Mallu Singh	Special appearance (Dancer)	Malayalam
2013	Cowboy	Laila	Malayalam
2014	Villali Veeran	Fathima/Pathu	Malayalam
2015	Thinkal Muthal Velli Vare	Herself	Malayalam
2016	Girls/Thiraikku Varatha Kathai	Ann Mary	Malayalam; Tamil
2016	Pravasalokam	Subaidha	Malayalam
2018	Ippozhum Eppozhum Sthuthiyayirikkatte	Actress Reena	Malayalam
2021	DK	Justina	Malayalam
TBA	Gowri	Gowri	Malayalam

== Awards and nominations ==
Year	Ceremony	Category	Serial	Role	Result
2008	Asianet Television Awards	Best Actress in a negative role	Ente Manasaputhri	Glory	Won
2013	Asianet Television Awards	Best Actress	Ammakili	Devika	Nominated
2013	Asianet Television Awards	Most Popular Actress	Ammakili	Devika	Won
2015	Asianet Television Awards	Best Actress in a negative role	Karuthamuthu	Mareena	Nominated
2015	Asianet Television Awards	Special jury (Negative role (Female)	Karuthamuthu	Mareena	Won
2016	Asianet Television Awards	Best Actress in a negative role	Karuthamuthu	Mareena	Won
2017	Asianet Television Awards	Best Actress in a negative role	Karuthamuthu	Mareena	Won
2017	Asianet Comedy Awards	Best Actress (TV)	5 Star Thattukada	Nancy	Won

== Albums ==
- 2001 Nilamazhayayi
- 2002 Malaikah
- 2005 Ennum Ninakkayi
- 2010 Orunaal
- 2018 Karivalayum Kanmashiyum
- 2022 Keralam Gathi Mattum
