= Chief Minister K. R. Gowthami =

Chief Minister K.R. Gowthami
- Directed by: Babu Raj (Babu Cherthala)
- Written by: Salim Cherthala
- Screenplay by: Salim Cherthala
- Produced by: C. K. Ashokan
- Starring: Vijayaraghavan; Devan; Geetha; Sukumari
- Cinematography: P. Sukumar
- Edited by: K. Sankunni
- Music by: Mohan Sithara
- Production company: Charangattu Movies
- Distributed by: Charangattu Movies
- Release date: 1994
- Country: India
- Language: Malayalam

Chief Minister K.R. Gowthami is a 1994 Indian Malayalam film, directed by Babu Raj and produced by C. K. Ashokan. Titled in the name of KR Gowthami, the film was based on the life of K. R. Gouri Amma. This movie was made in 1994 after K.R Gouri was ousted from CPIM. The film stars Geetha, Vijayaraghavan, Devan and Sukumari in the lead roles. The film has musical score by Mohan Sithara.

== Cast ==
- Vijayaraghavan as Adv.Anathan
- Devan as K.V Chakko
- Geetha as Adv.K.R Gouwthamy
- Prathapachandran as Kolakkattu Raghavan
- C. I. Paul as Ramakrishnan
- Ashokan as Santhosh
- Jose Pellissery as Sreedharan Potty
- Kollam Thulasi as Sachithandan
- Kunchan as A.Kumaran Nambiyar
- Mohan Jose as Abdu
- Cherthala Lalitha as Pathumma
- Tony as Thajudheen
- Beena Antony as Sainaba
- Chithra as Anitha
- Sukumari
- Kumarji Ponnadu
- Sathaar
- K. P. A. C. Azeez
- Chaithanya
- Jagannatha Varma
- Njarakkal Sreeni

== Soundtrack ==
The music was composed by Mohan Sithara.

No.	Song	Singers	Lyrics	Length (m:ss)
1	"Innu Muzhuvan Njan"	Changampuzha	Changampuzha	
2	"Malayappulayanaa Maadathin"	Changampuzha	Changampuzha	
3	"Poovanikkaatte"	G. Venugopal, Alice	P Bhaskaran	
4	"Rakthasaakshikale Laal Salaam"	K. J. Yesudas, Chorus	P. Bhaskaran	
