= Pratheeksha G Pradeep =

Indian television actress

- Born: 20 October 1995 (age 31); Konni,Pathanamthitta, Kerala, India
- Occupation: Actress
- Years active: 2013-Present

Pratheeksha G Pradeep is an Indian television actress who appears in supporting roles in Malayalam-language soap operas.

== Filmography ==
=== Films ===
Year	Title	Role	Notes	Ref.
2018	Thinkal Muthal Velli Vare	Herself		
2017	Vishwa Vikhyatharaya Payyanmar	Tharu's friend		
2018	Nervarenn Immini Charinjootta	Herself		

=== Television ===
Year	Title	Role	Channel	Notes
2013-2014	Amma	Meenakshi	Asianet	Debut
2014	Amala		Mazhavil Manorama	
2014	Amma Manasam	Chithra	Surya TV	
2014-2015	Ennu Swantham Koottukari	Mariya	Mazhavil Manorama	
2015	Manjurukum Kalam	Sunitha	Mazhavil Manorama	
2015-2017	Pranayam	Aswathy Iyer	Asianet	
2015	Sthreedhanam		Asianet	
2015-2016	Sthreethvam		Surya TV	
2016	Chavarayachan	Thamburatty	Flowers TV	
2016-2018	Athmasakhi	Niya	Mazhavil Manorama	
2017	Seetha	Mythili	Flowers TV	
2017	Karuthamuthu	Raveena	Asianet	
2017	Parishudhan		Flowers TV	
2017–2021	Kasthooriman	Shivani	Asianet	
2018	Seetha Kalyanam	Herself as Model	Asianet	Cameo appearance
2019	Arayannangalude Veedu	Alamelu	Flowers TV	
2019-2020	Oridathu Oru Rajakumari	Anu	Surya TV	
2020–2023	Neeyum Njanum	Rekha	Zee Keralam	
2020–2022	Mounaragam	Sarayu	Asianet	Replaced Madhusri, Replaced By Darshana Das
2020–2021	Rouravam	Kavitha Vinod	Green TV	Web series
2023– 2025	Geeta Govindam	Avarnika	Asianet	
2023–2024	Ninnishtam Ennishtam	Shweta	Surya TV	Replaced Parvathy
2025–present	Hridayam	Chandralekha	Surya TV	
2025–present	Advocate Anjali	Kavya	Asianet	

==== Special appearances ====
Year	Title	Role	Notes	Ref.
2015	Smart Show	Contestant		
2016	Don't Do Don't Do	Participant		
2017	Star War	Contestant		
2019	Onnum Onnum Moonu	Guest		
2019	Thakarppam Comedy	Guest		
2019	Badai Bungalow	Herself		
2019	Start Music: Aaradyam Paadum	Participant		
2019	Comedy Stars (Season 2)	Guest		
2021	Parayam Nedam	Contestant		
2021	Valkannadi	Participant		
