= Beena Antony =

Indian actress

- Born: Manjummel, Kochi, Kerala
- Occupations: Actor; dancer; presenter
- Years active: 1991–present
- Spouse: Manoj Nair (m. 2003)
- Children: 1
- Parents: Antony; Lilly

Beena Antony is an Indian actress who appears in Malayalam film and television serials. She was seen in supporting roles in films and television serials in her later career, including Omanathinkal Pakshi, Mayaseetha, Ente Manasaputhri, Autograph and Thapasya.

== Early and personal life ==
Beena was born at Manjummel in Kochi as the second youngest daughter of Antony and Lilly. She studied at Guardian Angels' School, Manjummel. She was quite active in her parish church, Our Lady of Immaculate Conception Church in Manjummel.

Beena was married to actor Manoj Nair in 2003. The couple has a son named Aaromal Nair.

== Career ==
She made her film debut in 1991 through the film Kanalkkattu.

Beena Antony appeared in a number of popular Doordarshan serials till the mid-1990s. The popular serial Oru Kudayum Kunju Pengalum gave her more fame. She appeared in some of the popular serials such as Ente Manasaputhri (Asianet), Ammakkili (Asianet), Indhraneelam (Amrita TV), Autograph (Asianet), Aalippazham, Nirakkootu, Charulatha (Surya TV), Omanathinkal Pakshi, Sree Ayyappanum Vavarum, Indhira, Kunjalimarrikkiar, Ente Alphonsamma, Mayaseetha, Butterflies, Ardhachandrante Rathri, Abhinethri, Amala, Sarayu (Surya TV), Pranayam, Kasthooriman (Asianet) are a few famous serials she has been a part of.

== Filmography ==
Year	Title	Role	Sources
1986	Onnu Muthal Poojyam Vare	Child artist	
1991	Godfather	Beena	
1991	Kilukkampetti	Cameo in song	
1991	Koodikazhcha		
1991	Nettippattom	Sandhya	
1991	Kanalkkattu	Bhaskaran Nair's daughter	
1992	Yodha	Ashokan's sister	
1992	Adharam	Sreedevi	
1992	Valayam	Sumathi	
1992	Kallanum Polisum	Stella	
1992	Mahanagaram	Ummerkutty's wife	
1992	Aayushkalam	Balakrishnan's sister	
1992	Ponnaramthottathe Raajaavu	Geetha	
1992	Ellarum Chollanu	Ramachandran's sister	
1992	Ennodu Ishtam Koodamo	Arathy's friend	
1992	Thiruthalvaadi	Office staff	
1993	Sthalathe Pradhana Payyans	Radha, Gopalakrishnan's sister	
1993	Pravachakan	Kusumam	
1993	Bandhukkal Sathrukkal	Sugandhi	
1993	Aagneyam	Sunitha	
1993	Ghoshayaathra	Oppana dancer	
1993	Yaadhavam	SI Nagesh's wife	
1993	Varam	Leema	
1993	Bharathettan Varunnu		
1993	Padaleeputhram		
1993	Ithu Manjukalam	Bindhu	
1994	Chief Minister K. R. Gowthami	Sainabha	
1994	Bharanakoodam	Mini	
1994	Kadal		
1994	Tharavadu	Sarina	
1994	Bhagyavaan	Singer	
1994	Sukrutham	Teacher	
1994	Vendor Daniel State Licency	Servant Thresia	
1994	Bharya	Ramani	
1995	Agnidevan	Vasudeva Warrier's Daughter	
1995	Manikya Chempazhukka	Girija	
1995	Pai Brothers	Typist	
1995	Rajakeeyam	Giri's daughter	
1996	Easwaramoorthy IN	Veena	
1996	Mayooranritham	Sujatha	
1996	Udhyanapalakan	Bindhu	
1996	Azhakiya Ravanan	Herself	
1996	Kavadam		
1996	King Solomon		
1997	Poonilavu	Alice	
1997	Snehadooth	Janu	
1998	Poothiruvathira Ravil	Rajamma	
1998	Kalyana Unnikal	Cameo	
1998	Meenthoni	Shiney	
1998	Nakshatratharattu	Jayan's wife	
1998	Aaraam Jaalakam		
1999	Garshom	Habeeb's wife	
2000	Mankolangal	Seetha	
2001	Korappan The Great	Sasi's sister	
2005	Hridayathil Sookshikkan	Bhanu	
2006	Smart City	Saleena	
2008	Amma	Bhavaniyamma	Short film
2010	Kaaryasthan	Herself	
2010	Pathinonnil Vyazham	Kalyani	
2011	Trikannu		
2011	Ithu Nammude Katha	—N/a	Dubbed for Kalarenjini; Character: Sethulakshmi
2012	Karppooradeepam	Vijayalakshmi	
2012	Theruvunakshathrangal	School Principal	
2013	Weeping Boy	Gynecologist	
2014	Sneha Veyil	Krishna	Short film
2015	Sarathi	Sindhu	
2015	Thinkal Muthal Velli Vare	Herself	
2016	Dhanayathra	Advocate	
2020	Aashanka	Herself	
2020	Karuthalanu Karuth	Herself	Music video
2022	Aval	Wife	Short film
2026	Balan: The Boy	Shamna	

== Television ==
=== Partial list ===
Year(s)	Title	Role	Channel	Notes
1992	Inakkam Pinakkam		DD Malayalam	Debut serial
1992	Unneede Amma		DD Malayalam	
1996	Oru Kudayum Kunjupengalum	Echechi	DD Malayalam	
1996	Snehapoorvam Nandhinikuttikku	Nandhinikutty	DD Malayalam	Telefilm
1996	Miss Mary Theresa Paul	Miss Mary Theresa Paul	DD Malayalam	Telefilm
1997	Nilavariyunnu		DD Malayalam	
1997	Indulekha		DD Malayalam	
1997	Paliyathachan		DD Malayalam	
1997	Ladies Hostel		DD Malayalam	
1997	Muttathu Varkey Kathakal		DD Malayalam	
	Pattolaponnu		DD Malayalam	
	Thottangal		DD Malayalam	
	Amma			Telefilm
	Abhinethri			Telefilm
	Aswathy			Telefilm
	Mavelikkara Post Office			Telefilm
	Poovali			Telefilm
	Justice			Telefilm
	Neelakidathi		DD Malayalam	
	Kalippata Kadayile Sthree		DD Malayalam	Telefilm
	Kaashithumbaykkum Kalyaanam		DD Malayalam	Telefilm
	Neelakidathi		DD Malayalam	
2000	Nombarangal	Devu		Telefilm
	Yudham			Telefilm
1998	Alathachakram	Malini		
1998	Ekatharakam			
1998	Kanneerpadam			
1998	Samayam		Asianet	
1998–2000	Sthree	Aarthi	Asianet	
	Gokulam		Asianet	
1999	Krishnathulasi	Thulasi	Asianet	
2000	Jwalayayi		DD Malayalam	
2000	Nirakoottu		Asianet	
2000	Mayaseetha		DD Malayalam	
	Velutha Chembarathi		DD Malayalam	
	Thapasya	Anitha	DD Malayalam	
	Charulatha	Charulatha	Surya TV	
	Maaya		Kairali TV	
	Manassariyathe		Kairali TV	
2001	Makal Marumkal		Surya TV	
2001	Gouri	Gouri	DD Malayalam	Replaced Meenakumari
2002	Sadashivante Kumbasaram		DD Malayalam	
2003–2004	Vasundhara Medicals	Rani	Asianet	
2004	Muhoortham		Asianet	
2004–2005	Culcutta hospital	Dr. Vijayalakshmi	Surya TV	
2004–2007	Minnukettu		Surya TV	
2005	Omanathinkal Pakshi	Mercy	Asianet	Later replaced by Anju Aravind
2005	Kayamkulam Kochunni	Padachi Paru	Surya TV	
2005	MT Kathakal	Ammalu amma	Amrita TV	
2005	Aalippazham		Surya TV	
2006	Njan Sthree		Asianet	Sequel to Sthree
2006	Nombarappoovu		Asianet	
2006	Samadooram		Asianet	
2006	Veendum Jwalayai		DD Malayalam	
2006	Kilukkampetty		Surya TV	
2006	Manaporutham	Amma	Surya TV	
2007	Punarjanamam	Yamuna	Surya TV	
2007–2010	Ente Manasaputhri	Yamuna	Asianet	Sequel to Punarjanmam
2007	Prayaanam	Jayasree	Surya TV	
2008–2009	Aa Amma		Surya TV	
2008–2009	Velankani Mathavu	Mary	Surya TV	
2008	Sree Ayyappanum Vavarum		Surya TV	
2008	Sree Mahabhagavatham	Urmila	Asianet	
2008	Vishudha Thomasleeha		Asianet	
2009	Akkare Ikkare	Sukumari Amma	Asianet	
2009	Ente Alphonsamma	Mary	Asianet	
2009	Kunjalimarikkar	Suhara's umma	Asianet	
2009	Ammathottil	Soumini	Asianet	
2009–2010	Autograph	Leenamma		
2010	Kudumbarahasyam	Ayisha		Telefilm
2010	Indhraneelam	Uma Balachandran	Surya TV	
2010	Butterflies	Teacher	Surya TV	
2010	Mattoruval	Yamuna's mother	Surya TV	
2010	Kadamattathachan		Surya TV	
2011	Ardhachandrante Rathri		Amrita TV	
2011	De Maveli Kombath	Pavithran's wife	Asianet	Telefilm
2011–2012	Ammakkili	Nimmy	Asianet	
2012	Abhinethri		Surya TV	
2013–2014	Sarayu	Lalammal	Surya TV	
2013–2014	Indira		Mazhavil Manorama	
2013–2014	Nirapottukal		JaiHind TV	
2013–2015	Amma	Urmila	Asianet	
2013–2015	Amala	Sudha	Mazhavil Manorama	
2013	Nirakoottu		Kairali TV	
2013	Nirapakittu		Media One	Sequel to Nirakoottu
2014	Dhathuputhri	Kanchana	Mazhavil Manorama	
2014–2015	Ennu Swantham Koottukari	Adv. Shivaranjini	Mazhavil Manorama	
2015–2017	Pranayam	Madhavi Govinda Menon	Asianet	
2015–2016	Punarjani	Selina	Surya TV	
2016	Aluvayum Mathikkariyum	Rani	Asianet Plus	
2016–2018	Athmasakhi	Bhagyalakshmi Madhava Menon	Mazhavil Manorama	
2016	Thattukadayile Aluvayum Mathikariyum		Asianet Plus	Telefilm
2016	Jagratha	Krishnaprabha	Amrita TV	
2017	Jagratha	Subhadra	Amrita TV	New Season
2017–2018	Maamankam	Kanimagalath Kanakadurga	Flowers TV	
2017–2018	Malarvadi	Ambat Vasanthakumari	Flowers TV	
2018–2020	Kasthooriman	Indira Bhai	Asianet	
2019	Adutha Bellodu Koodi	Suhasini	Zee Keralam	
2019–2020	Oridathoru Rajakumari	Savithri Akkan	Surya TV	
2019	Kudumba Kodathi	Jamandhi	Kairali TV	
2020	Amma	Sr. Gladis	Kairali TV	Untelecasted on TV; YouTube release 2020
2020–2026	Mounaragam	Shari	Asianet	Replaced Saritha Balakrishnan
2021	Pookkalam Varavayi	Kalyanikuttyamma a.k.a. Achammaa Kunjamma	Zee Keralam	
2021–2022	Ente Maathavu	Nethravathi	Surya TV	
2022–2023	Aavani	Rohini	Mazhavil Manorama	
2023	Patharamattu	Shari	Asianet	Mahasangamam episodes with Mounaragam
2024	Home	Arundhati	Flowers TV	

=== Radio drama ===
- Sagara Rajakumari

=== Television shows ===
==== Reality shows ====
- Thakarppan Comedy (as contestant)
- Kuttikalavara (as mentor)
- Comedy Stars (as mentor)
- Sundari Neeyum Sundaran NJanum (as contestant)
- Tharotsavam (as contestant)
- Nakshathradeepangal (as contestant)
- Super Jodi (as contestant)
- Amma Ammayiyamma (as Judge)
- Hairomax Mrs. Kerala (as Judge)
- Josco Super Dancer Junior (as Judge)
- Comedy Challenge (as Judge)
- Komady Circus (Mazhavil Manorama)
- Red Carpet (as mentor)

==== Game shows as participant ====
- Sarigama (Asianet)
- Pachakuthira (Kairali TV)
- Rani Maharani (Surya TV)
- Suryolsavam Super Challenge (Surya TV)
- Smart Show (Flowers TV)
- Thara Kabadi (Flowers TV)
- Keralolsavam (Surya TV)
- Start Music Aaradhyam Padum (Asianet)
- Super Bumper Season 3 (Zee Keralam)
- Start Music Aaradhyam Padum Season 2 (Asianet)
- Parayam Nedam (Amrita TV)
- Start Music Aaradhyam Padum Season 3 (Asianet)
- Valkannadi (Asianet)
- Bzinga (Zee Keralam)
- Panam Tharum Padam (Mazhavil Manorama)
- My G Flowers Oru Kodi (Flowers TV)

==== As host ====
- Super Chef - (Asianet Plus)
- Taste Time - (Asianet)
- Ruchivismayam (Mazhavil Manorama)
- Ruchibhedam (ACV)
- Taste of Kerala (Amrita TV)
- Thezbeen (YouTube)
- Thaninadan (Mazhavil Manorama)
- Atham Pathu Ruchi 2020 (Mazhavil Manorama)
- Onnonnara Ruchi (Zee Keralam)

==== Other shows ====
- Onnum Onnum Moonu (Mazhavil Manorama)
- Ivide Inganannu Bhai (Mazhavil Manorama)
- Chaya Koppayile Kodumkattu (Mazhavil Manorama)
- Parambarapayasam (Mazhavil Manorama)
- Manam Pole Maangalyam (Jaihind TV)
- Njangalkkum Parayanund (Mathrubhumi News)
- Grihasakhi (Jeevan TV)
- Star Jam (Kappa TV)
- Annie's Kitchen (Amrita TV)
- Amrita Online Chat Room (Amrita TV)
- A Chat With Celebrity (Amrita TV)
- Lal Salam (Amrita TV)
- Snehitha (Amrita TV)
- Malayali Durbar (Amrita TV)
- Ladies Corner (Janam TV)
- Gulumal (Surya TV)
- Atma Suryotsavam (Surya TV)
- Serial Diary (Surya TV)
- Johnson's Baby Powder Shishu Samrakshanam (Surya TV)
- Manassiloru Mazhavillu (Kairali TV)
- Veettamma (Kairali TV)
- Nammal Thammil (Asianet)
- Angane Oru Vishukalathu (Asianet)
- Best Family (Asianet)
- Star Candid (Asianet)
- My Partner (Asianet)
- Comedy Challenge (Asianet Plus)
- Labour Room (Asianet Plus)
- Run Baby Run (Asianet Plus)
- Don't Do Don't Do (Asianet Plus)
- Musik Plus (Asianet Plus)
- Ennishtam (ACV)
- Thiranottam (ACV)
- Day with a Star (Kaumudy TV)
- Oru Hindustani Onam (Kaumudy TV)
- Flowers top singer 3 (Flowers)
- Maamankam Oru Tharamamangam (Flowers)
- Innathe Chinthavishayam (Flowers)
- Tharadambathimarude Samsthana Sammelanam (Flowers)
- Ormakal Marikkumo (DD Malayalam)
- Aanamalayila Aanapappan
- Redlink Online
- Hi Hello with Helen
- Serial Today
- Choych Choych Povam
- Cinematheque
- Dinner Talk
- Icebreak with Veena
- Indian Cinema Gallery
