= Suryavamsam (TV series) =

2020 Indian Tamil television series

- Genre: Soap opera Family
- Written by: Dialogues; Vasakar Kaaliyappan
- Screenplay by: Jyothi Arunachalam
- Directed by: R. Karthikeyan
- Starring: Nikitha Rajesh; Aashish Chakravarthi; Poornima Bhagyaraj
- Music by: Sekar Sai Bharath; Vishal Chandrashekhar
- Opening theme: "Etho Ninaikudhu" sung by Sinduri Vishal
- Country of origin: India
- Original language: Tamil
- No. of seasons: 1
- No. of episodes: 292

Production
- Producer: S. Sabreesh Kumar
- Production locations: Vellore, Tamil Nadu
- Cinematography: Kalaivaanan
- Editor: BharathKumar - Pandidurai
- Camera setup: Multi-camera
- Running time: approx. 20-22 minutes per episode
- Production company: Monk Studios

Original release
- Network: Zee Tamil
- Release: 21 September 2020 – 21 August 2021

Related
- America Ammayi

Suryavamsam (translated as Lineage of the Sun God) is a 2020 Indian Tamil-language soap opera on Zee Tamil starring Poornima Bhagyaraj, Nikitha Rajesh and Aashish Chakravarthi. It premiered on 21 September 2020 and ended on 21 August 2021. It is an official remake of the Zee Telugu series America Ammayi.

== Plot ==
Annammal disowns her daughter Kalyani and ostracizes her from the family for marrying against her consent. After 25 years, Kalyani falls ill and wishes to reunite with her family, so her daughter Samantha takes it upon herself to bring the family together. She goes to her grandparents and before convincing them to accept Kalyani, she falls in love with her maternal uncle's son, Surya.

One day, Annammal's son Shanmugham steals the diamonds which arrived at an exhibition in the Suryavamsam mall. When she learns he stole the diamonds, she lashes out at him, but his wife Raji interferes and upsets Annammal, causing Annammal to leave the house.

Narayanan takes Nirmala Devi's phone number from Jayanthi and tells her to come to India with Samanya. When Samantha and Surya get engaged, the real Samanya appears to the Suryavamsam family and tells Jayanthi that Samantha had used her name falsely.

After a few days, Abhishek, who lives near the Suryavamsam house, acts as though he loves Leelavathi, who believes his intentions are pure. Samanya sees an opportunity to use Abhishek in order to separate the family, who steals Samanya's credit card to purchase gifts for Leelavathi.

Abhishek enters the Suryavamsam house secretly to talk with Leelavathi, who steals Surya's laptop. Abhishek hacks it to withdraw all the money from the Suryavamsam family's bank account. Clients of the Suryavamsam family's companies file a complaint against the family due to their checks bouncing, and the police investigate the family at its home.

Nirmala Devi thinks that all the property has been stolen, which is why she wants to marry her daughter to Surya. Samanya blackmails Surya with a knife, and he agrees to marry Samanya. Abhishek calls Leelavathi, but she hesitates and tells Samanya to take the call but Abhishek's phone is switched off. Abhishek calls Leela again and she talks with him and Samantha overhears. Samanya sees Samantha and calls Jayanthi to create a conflict between Jayanthi and Samantha. Samantha gives a clue to Chandru to find about the person who talked with Leela, and discovers it is Abhishek, The next day, Chandru and Surya recall their first meeting with Samantha. Chandru follows Lellavathi and Samanya and concludes there is a problem.

Samanya is invited to a hotel by Abhishek, where she takes his laptop and caught him to police and he is arrested. Then Surya throws away the family photo because the marker trace on Kalyani's face in the photo is removed. One of Abhishek's minions blackmails Leelavathi to bring Abhi's laptop from Samanya. Samantha is kidnapped when Abishek's minions learn that the laptop is not there. Srinivas beats them and releases Samantha, but Samanya kidnaps Samantha. Samanya fakes injuries to make Surya believe Samantha kidnapped her.

== Cast ==
=== Main ===
- Nikitha Rajesh as Samantha (Sam)
  - A naughty, kind-hearted American woman, who tries to reunite her mother (Kalyani)with the "Suryavamsam" family. She entered under the name Samanya in Suryavamsam and everyone thought that she was Jayanthi's friend's daughter, but she was Chris and Kalyani's daughter; Annammal and Selva Ganapathy's grand daughter; Padmavathi, Chandru and Leelavathi's cousin; and, Surya's cousin and love interest.
- Aashish Chakravarthi as Surya
  - Samantha calls him "Black Coffee". He is a rude, but calm and kind-hearted person who is Jayanthi and Shankaran's son; Annammal and Selva Ganapathy's first grand son; Leelavathi's elder brother; Padmavathi and Chandru's cousin brother; and, Samantha's maternal cousin and love interest.
- Poornima Bhagyaraj as Annapoorani (Annammal)
  - The present head of the "Suryavamsam" family who makes all the decisions in the family. She hates her own daughter Kalyani, as she married a foreigner Chris despite her wishes. She was the wife of Selva Ganapathy; mother of Shanmugam, Shankaran and Kalyani; mother-in-law of Raji and Jayanthi; and the grandmother of Surya, Samantha, Padmavathi, Chandru and Leelavathi.

=== Recurring ===
- Nithya Raj as Samanya
  - The real Samanya. She wants to marry Surya and loathes Samantha.
- Rajesh as Selva Ganapathy (deceased)
  - Suryavamsam's former head. He was Annammal's husband; Shanmugam, Shankaran and Kalyani's father; Raji and Jayanthi's father-in-law; Narayanan's elder brother; and the grandfather of Surya, Samantha, Padmavathi, Chandru and Leelavathi.
- Sandhana (Episode 1–285) / Akila (Episode 286–292) as Kalyani
  - An innocent lady, who marries a foreigner, Chris Parker, despite her family's concerns and settles in the United States of America. She has become ill and wants to reunite with her family. She was Annammal and Selva Ganapathy's daughter; Shanmugam and Shankaran's younger sister; and Chris's wife and Samantha's mother.
- Rafi Ullah as Chris Parker
  - A foreigner, Samantha's father; Kalyani's husband; and Annammal and Selva Ganapathy's son-in-law.
- Anitha Venkat as Raji
  - A traditional woman who is Annammal and Selva Ganapathy's daughter-in-law; Shanmugam's wife; Jayanthi's co-sister; Samantha's aunt; and Padmavathi and Chandru's mother. She was also Annammal's brother's daughter.
- Caroline Hiltrud as Jayanthi
  - A trendy woman who is Annammal and Selva Ganapathy's daughter-in-law; Shankaran's wife; Raji's co-sister, Samantha's aunt; and Surya and Leelavathi's mother.
- Birla Bose (Episode 1–82) / Gokul (Episode 83–208) / Krishna Kumar (Episode 209–292) as Shanmugam
  - Annammal and Selva Ganapathy's first son; Raji's husband; Shankaran and Kalyani's elder brother; Samantha's uncle; and Padmavathi and Chandru's father.
- Gajesh as Shankaran
  - Annammal and Selva Ganapathy's son; Jayanthi's husband; Shanmugam and Kalyani's brother; Samantha's uncle; and Surya and Leelavathi's father.
- Sindhu Sadhana as Padmavathi (Padma)
  - Annammal and Selva Ganapathy's granddaughter; Srinivasan's lover, then wife; Raji and Shanmugam's daughter; Surya and Padmavathi's cousin sister; Samantha's cousin; and Chandru's elder sister.
- Madhan as Chandru
  - Annammal and Selva Ganapathy's grandson; Raji and Shanmugam's son; Surya and Leelavathi's cousin brother; Samantha's cousin; and Padmavathi's younger brother.
- Dhachayani as Leelavathi
  - Annammal and Selva Ganapathy's granddaughter; Jayanthi and Shankaran's daughter; Padmavathi and Chandru's cousin sister; Samantha's cousin; and Surya's younger sister.
- Mithun Raj as Abhishek
  - The fake lover of Leelavathi.
- Kiruba as Samanya's mother
  - Jayanthi's friend.
- Ramachandran Mahalingam as Narayanan
  - The antagonist, who is in favor of Shanmugam, Raji and Chandru to possess them. He was Selva Ganapathy's younger brother; Shanmugam, Shankaran and Kalyani's paternal uncle; and the great-uncle of Surya, Samantha, Padmavathi, Chandru and Leelavathi.
- Jayaraman Mohan as Srinivasan
  - A proposed bridegroom for Padmavathi, who loves her at first sight. However, his parents oppose this marriage.
- Kavithalaya Krishnan as Krishna
  - Srinivsan's father, who went to the Suryavamsam house to seek Padmavathi as his son Srinivasan's bride. When he learns about the Suryavamsam family's renunciation of Kalyani, he refuses Padmavathi and cancels the marriage proposal. In the end, he accepts Padma and Srinivas’ marriage.

=== Cameos ===
- Banu Mathy as Kasthuri
- Lavanya Manickam as Priya
- Paandi as Sambandham
- Arunkumar Padmanabha
- Manikandaraj Major
- "Metti Oli" Shanthi
- Premalatha as Prema
- Sangeetha Balan as Kamakshi

== Production ==
=== Launch ===
The production company originally decided to launch the series before March 2020, but due to the COVID-19 pandemic, the production and filming of the television series were delayed. After filming was permitted in India, the series resumed and Zee Tamil decided to launch this series. The first promo was released on YouTube by Zee Tamil on 2 September 2020.

=== Casting ===
Poornima Bhagyaraj was selected to play the head of the family. With Arundathi series fame, Nikitha Rajesh was selected for the female lead and Aashish Chakravarthi, the winner of Mr. Chennai International 2019, was selected to play a male lead.

== Crossover episodes ==
Suryavamsam cast and crew joined Maha Sangamam with "Neethane Enthan Ponvasantham" from 25 January to 26 February 2021.

== Adaptations ==
| Language | Title | Original release | Network(s) | Last aired | Notes |
|---|---|---|---|---|---|
| Telugu | America Ammayi అమెరికా అమ్మాయి | 27 July 2015 | Zee Telugu | 21 July 2018 | Original |
| Tamil | Suryavamsam சூர்யவம்சம் | 21 September 2020 | Zee Tamil | 21 August 2021 | Remake |
| Punjabi | Tere Dil Vich Rehan De ਤੇਰੇ ਦਿਲ ਵਿੱਚ ਰਹਿਣ ਦੇ | 22 November 2021 | Zee Punjabi | 22 April 2022 | Remake |
