= Manjurukum Kalam =

Indian Malayalam-language soap opera

- Genre: Soap opera
- Based on: Manjurukum Kaalam by Joycee
- Directed by: Binu Vellathooval; Manu Joy C
- Starring: Monisha Arshak; Nikitha Rajesh; (See below)
- Theme music composer: Sanand George
- Opening theme: "Aarum Kaanathe Aromalkili Paadunnu"
- Composer: Sanand George
- Country of origin: India
- Original language: Malayalam
- No. of seasons: 1
- No. of episodes: 571

Production
- Producer: Suresh Unnithan
- Cinematography: Harilal
- Camera setup: Multi-camera
- Running time: 20-22 minutes
- Production company: Sree Movies

Original release
- Network: Mazhavil Manorama
- Release: 16 February 2015 – 24 March 2017

Manjurukum Kaalam is an Indian Malayalam-language soap opera directed by Binu Vellathooval and produced by Suresh Unnithan. The show aired from 16 February 2015 to 24 March 2017 on Mazhavil Manorama, spanning 571 episodes. It is an adaptation of the novel with the same name by Joycee.

The narrative follows the life of a young girl, Janaki who navigates a life of extreme hardship, domestic abuse, and complex family dynamics from childhood to adulthood. The show features Keziah Thomas, Niranjana G, Greeshma, Vedika Rajesh, Nikitha Rajesh and Monisha Arshak who portrays the protagonist at different stages of her life. The supporting cast includes Manoj Nair, Lavanya Nair, Manju Satheesh, Roslin and Kishore Peethambbaran.

== Plot ==
The story centers on Janaki, affectionately known as Janikutty, whose life is a journey from a cherished childhood to a series of grueling hardships. Once called "Malooty", she was the daughter of a poor postman, Govindankutty, and her mother died in labor. By fate, Govindankutty meets Vijayaraghavan and Rathnamma, both teachers, who were trying for a child for many years now. When they see Malooty, Rathnamma grows intensely attached to her. As a result, they request govindankutty to give them his child, as he was very poor and unable to go to any work because he had to take care of his mother, who was suffering from old age. When Govindankutty's mother too perishes shortly after, He begins considering their request and agrees to give her to them. Then she is raised as the beloved adopted daughter of Tahsildar Vijayaraghavan and Ratnamma Teacher, who frets upon her indefinetly and loves her deeply. She is also renamed "Janaki," Alias Janikutty. Govindankutty visits once more and finds that she is extremely well cared for, with dozens of toys and Rathnamma and Vijayaraghavan even saving 1 gram of gold per month for her future marriage. He is saddened by how she does not even remember him, and her name is also changed. They request Govindankutty that they will take care of her, and he gives in and leaves, trying to lead a new life. Jaani's world is turned upside down when the couple finally conceives biological children. No longer the center of their world, Janikutty is treated as a domestic servant and subjected to systematic abuse by Ratnamma. She remains a brilliant and resilient student despite the trauma she endures at home.Janikutty now an adult,returns to her biological father Govindankutty. She moves into his home, where she meets his second wife, Vijayamma, and her half-siblings. While Janikutty attempts to bond with her new family, she is subjected to extreme cruelty by Vijayamma’s sister, Chandramathi. Following Govindankutty’s sudden death from a heart attack—Janikutty is left vulnerable. Chandramathi and her husband hire thugs to murder her. Janikutty narrowly escapes the attempt on her life but is left severely injured and hospitalized. While recovering in the hospital, Janikutty meets Shobhana Teacher, a childhood friend of her biological mother. She reveals that Janikutty's late biological mother Aswathy was estranged daughter of a parliamentarian named Balakrishnan Panicker and he disowned her years prior for marrying Govindankutty, who belonged to a lower social caste. Aware of Janikutty's existence from Shobhana Teacher, he then takes her to his mansion but their happiness is short lived as he falls ill and becomes bed ridden. Janikutty then lives with his sister Sarada and her son Madhusoodana Panicker who was Aswathy's Muracherukkan and with their support she climbed great heights eventually becoming revenue minister. Having reclaimed her identity and status, Janikutty visits a now-remorseful Ratnamma Teacher to offer her grace, maintaining the bond of a daughter despite the years of mistreatment and finally marries Abhijith.

== Cast ==
=== Main ===
- Monisha Shaji as V.R Janaki (Janikutty) and Aswathikkutti, Janaki's biological mother(photo and flashback)
  - Nikitha Rajesh as Teenager/Young Adult Janikutty

Keziah Thomas, Niranjana G, Greeshma, and Vedika Rajesh portrayed different stages of Janaki's childhood.

=== Recurring ===
- Lavanya Nair/ Manju Satheesh as Rathnamma, Janaki's foster mother
- Manoj Nair as Vijayaraghavan, Janaki's foster father
- Kishore Peethambaran as Govindankutty, Janaki's biological father
- Roslin as Vasumatiamma,Vijayaraghavan's mother
- Anish Rehman as Abhijith, Janaki's husband
  - Vineeth as young Abhijith
- Lekshmi Prasad as Sariga, Abhijith's sister and Janaki's friend
  - Swathi as young Sariga
- Sreedevi Anil as Vijayamma, Govindankutty’s second wife
- Alice Christy as Sooryamol, daughter of Vijayaraghavan and Rathnamma
- Abhijith Joseph as Dilshid Muhammed aka Dil, Sooryamol's husband
- M. R. Gopakumar as Balakrishna Panikkar
- Cherthala Lalitha as Bhaanumathi Amma, Balakrishna Panikkar's wife
- Manoj Pillai as Murali Krishna Panikkar, Balakrishna Panikkar's elder son
- Karthika Kannan as Lakshmi, Murali's wife
- Yadu Krishnan as Madhusoodana Panikkar
- Geetha Nair as Shaaradaamma, Madhusoodana Panikkar's mother
- Dr.Jayan Gopinathan Nair as Gangadhara Panikkar, Balakrishna Panikkar's eldest son
- Beena Sunil as Raajasree(Raji), Balakrishna Panikkar's daughter
- Santhosh Souparnika as Viswanathan(Viswan), Rajasree's husband
- Rudra Pradap as Chandran, Rathnamma's elder brother
- Sumi Santhosh as Preetha, Chandran's wife
- Tomy as Sethu, Rathnamma' eldest brother
- Indulekha as Jayasudha, Sethu's wife
- Avanthika as Neethu, elder daughter of Chandran and Preetha
- Malavika / Arathi Sojan as Ramya, second daughter of Chandran and Preetha
- Sreekala as Sarasamma, Rathnamma's mother
- Pratheeksha G. Pradeep as Sunitha, Rathnamma's sister
- Raji P Menon as Shobana teacher
- Ardra Das as Ambili, elder daughter of Govindankutty and Vijayamma
  - Ritu Sarangi as teenage Ambili
- Anjusha Gopi as Arunima, second daughter of Govindankutty and Vijayamma
  - Vaishanvi Satheesh as teenage Arunima
- Ramesh Nair as Ravi, Sariga's husband
- Saharsh Augustin as Manikuttan
- Haridas Varkala as Kochukuttan, Manikkuttan's father
- Jolly Easho as Chandramathi, Vijayamma's elder sister
- Balan Parakkal as Surendran, Chandramathi's husband
- Sujith Kozhikodu as Sukeshan, Chandramathi's son
- Parvathy Raveendran as Suguna, Chandramathi's daughter
- Satheesh Vettikavala as Sasidharan, Suguna’s husband
- Karthika Kannan as Lekshmi
- Kottayam Achan kunju as Raghavan, Minister Janaki's driver
- Pappan Ananthapuri as Purushothaman, Govindankutty's friend
- Safar as Sahadevan, Govindankutty's neighbor
- Biju Thottumkal as Prathapan Minister Janaki’s PA
- Adhil Siddiq / Madhav / Harun as Appunni
- Rajesh as Kuttichan
- Aadil as Renjith, Janikutty's classmate
- Manas/ Aaromal as Ajayan
- Siddharaj as Achyutha Kurup
- Girija Preman as Govindankutty's sister
- Renji Philip Koshy as S.I Ajith Kumar
- Mithun Menon as Professor Vinayachandran

== Production ==
Different stages of the protagonist's life spanning from childhood to adulthood was played by six actors. Nikitha Rajesh who played Janaki left the show to focus on her board examinations and was replaced by Monisha Shaji. Lavanya Nair who played Rathnamma was replaced by Manju Satheesh due to the former's pregnancy.
