= Omanathinkal Pakshi =

Indian Malayalam-language soap opera

- Genre: Soap opera
- Based on: Omanathinkal Pakshi by Joycee
- Written by: Joycee
- Screenplay by: Joycee
- Story by: Joycee
- Directed by: Joycee; Sudheesh Sankar
- Starring: Lenaa; Srividya; (See below)
- Voices of: Devi S.
- Opening theme: "Omanathinkalpakshi" by K. S. Chithra
- Country of origin: India
- Original language: Malayalam

Production
- Producer: Suresh Unnithan
- Cinematography: Manoj Kumar
- Editor: K. Srinivas
- Running time: 20-22 minutes
- Production company: Sree Movies

Original release
- Network: Asianet
- Release: 24 January 2005 – 24 March 2006

Omanathinkal Pakshi is an Indian Malayalam-language television drama that aired on Asianet from January 2005 to 24 March 2006. It was directed by Sudheesh Sankar, based on the novel of the same name by Joycee. It starred Lenaa and Srividya in lead roles.

The show was re-telecast on Asianet Plus during the 2020 COVID-19 lockdown.

== Cast ==
- Lenaa as Jancy
- Srividya as Annamma
- Rajeev Parameshwar as Jimmy
- Beena Antony / Anju Aravind as Mercy
- Kanya Bharathi as Dr. Vimala George
- Santhakumari
- Sabitha Anand
- Sai Kumar
- Shalu Menon
- Tony Antony as Captain Benny Thomas
- Anil Mohan
- Sitara Balakrishnan
- Nikitha Rajesh as Annamol
- Anusree as Jithumon
