= America Ammayi (TV series) =

- Genre: Drama
- Written by: Sowmya Sharma
- Directed by: Ramu Kona/Srinivas Mallela
- Starring: See below
- Country of origin: India
- Original language: Telugu
- No. of episodes: 927

Production
- Production companies: Guru Production; Naadarup Creations

Original release
- Network: Zee Telugu
- Release: 27 July 2015 – 21 July 2018

Related
- Suryavamsam

America Ammayi (transl. American Girl) is a Telugu soap opera, which was broadcast on Zee Telugu from 27 July 2015 to 21 July 2018. It was a major success in Telugu television and also in the online space.

== Plot ==
America Ammayi is a story about a girl, Samantha, who was born and brought up in America and values Indian traditions and culture. Her mother, Kalyani was disowned by her parents after she chooses to marry an American, Chris against their wishes.

Over the years, Kalyani falls ill and wishes to reunite with her family. So, Samantha takes it upon herself to bring the family together. She enters her grandparents' house and before convincing them to accept their daughter, she falls in love with her maternal uncle's son, Surya, while helping her cousin (Padma) marry her loved one, Srinivas. After Padma's marriage Surya and Sam become engaged but a new character named Samanya, who also loves Surya enters, there after the story is about how Surya and Sam overcome Samanya's cruel acts and marry.

But here there is a twist in the story again as their marriage stops in between due to a photo which shows Sam's father killing their grandfather, Vajrapati Ranga Rao, which is not true. From here everyone is against Sam even her love Surya. The actual villain, i.e. the father of Saamanya, Chakradhar was the one who killed their grandfather, and blamed Sam's father, to have Samanya marry Surya. The actual flashback is that, in the past i.e. 20 years back, when Kalyani's marriage was fixed with Chakradhar, who came to Ranga Rao with an intention to become the only heir of Ranga Rao's property by marrying Kalyani. Their engagement occurred without the consent of Kalyani. After their engagement, Kalyani reveals to her parents that she does not like this marriage and she loves a man named Chris Williams. But her parents did not accept that and told her since their engagement was over, they cannot call off the marriage. So she leaves with her lover, without telling anyone. But after some days, she and Chris feel guilty and return to take the blessings of Ranga Rao. But he does not accept. But when Chakradhar comes in between, slaps Kalyani in front of her father, Ranga Rao understands the reality and supports the Kalyani-Chris marriage. This enrages Chakradhar. He chokes Ranga Rao to death and blames Chris. Chris tells this to Sam. Slowly, Savithramma, Jayanthi realises that Chris is the culprit and starts to hate Sam and thinks of getting Surya married to Sam. But Surya starts to believe in Sam because of his love for her. And when Surya gets to know about this truth, he and Sam try various to reveal the truth. But Chakradhar and Saamanya destroy their plans.

In this process, it is revealed that Surya has a twin, Aditya, Raji's first son, who was separated from his family immediately after his birth. It is later revealed that Jayanthi (Surya's mother) was the one who separated Aditya from the family to give her son Surya, the inheritance of the Vajrapati house. Aditya, who thinks that Jayanthi is his mother and she separated him from the family, comes to destroy the Vajrapati family. Sam learns of this, and tries to protect her family from Aditya with the help of his lover, Samyuktha and both try to make him realize his mistake and reunite him with his family. After realising his mistake, Aditya helps Surya and Sam and helps to reveal the truth to Savithramma, with the help of the family members and an eyewitness of Ranga Rao's murder Rangadu, whose tongue was cut by Chakradhar, so that he does not tell the truth to anyone. Later, the truth was revealed in front of Savithramma and Chakradhar is punished.

At the end, Sam and Surya marry, Sam's father is recognized as a good person and Kalyani and her mother reunite, and Aditya's marriage is fixed with Samyuktha.

== Cast ==
- Marina Abraham as Samantha Williams Vajrapati
- Seethakanth as Vajrapati Surya Narayana / Aditya
- Vyshnavee Gadde as Samyuktha
- Sravani as Samanya
- Geetanjali/Sri Durga as Lilly (Leelavathi)
- Preethi Nigam as Jayanthi
- Talluri Rameshwari / Siva Parvathi as Vajrapati Savitramma
- Jaya Lakshmi as Raji
- Surya as Rangadu
- Rajashree as Kalyani Williams
- Balaji as Chakradhar
- Nagesh Karra as Vajrapati Nageshwar Rao
- Srinivas as Vajrapati Rama Rao
- Varun Raj/Bharadwaj Bankupalli as Chandra
- Jyothi Poornima as Padmavathi
- Nayeem Khan as Srinivas
- Chalapathi Raju as Hari Krishna
- Sakshi Reddy as CI Deepika (Deepu)
- Jayanth Raghavan as Ganapathi
- Aadarsh as Manoj

== Adaptations ==
Language	Title	Original release	Network(s)	Last aired	Notes
Tamil	Suryavamsam சூர்யவம்சம்	21 September 2020	Zee Tamil	21 August 2021	Remake
Punjabi	Tere Dil Vich Rehan De ਤੇਰੇ ਦਿਲ ਵਿੱਚ ਰਹਿਣ ਦੇ	22 November 2021	Zee Punjabi	22 April 2022	Remake
