= Villali Veeran =

- Official poster
- Directed by: Sudheesh Sankar
- Written by: Dinesh Pallath
- Produced by: R. B. Choudary
- Starring: Dileep; Namitha Pramod; Siddique; Suresh Krishna; Kalabhavan Shajon
- Cinematography: Anil Nair
- Edited by: V. Jai Sankar
- Music by: S. A. Rajkumar
- Production company: Super Good Films
- Distributed by: Remya Release
- Release date: 6 September 2014 (India)
- Running time: 173 minutes
- Country: India
- Language: Malayalam

Villali Veeran is a 2014 Indian Malayalam-language romantic action comedy film produced by Super Good Films under the banner of Remya Release and directed by Sudheesh Sankar. The film stars Dileep in the lead role along with Namitha Pramod, Siddique, Suresh Krishna, Kalabhavan Shajon and Dharmajan Bolgatty in supporting roles. It was initially titled Bhuddhettan.

Upon release, the film received mixed reviews from critics.

== Plot ==
Siddharthan is an ordinary man whose love and care towards his sisters are profound. He spends lavishly and does anything for their satisfaction but is stingy when it comes to his own needs. This changes when Narmada comes into his life.

== Cast ==
- Dileep as Siddharthan (Siddhu)
- Siddique as Chandrasekaran, Siddharthan's father
- Sai Kumar as Kadamberi Viswhanathan
- Kalabhavan Shajohn as Sugunan
- Namitha Pramod as Narmada, Siddharthan's love interest
- Mythili as Aishwarya Giridhar, Siddharthan's ex-girlfriend and Giridhar's wife
- Dharmajan Bolgatty as Jyothisharathnam Poomeni Illath Brahmashri Biju Namboothiri
- Babu Antony as Commissioner George Chacko IPS
- Suresh Krishna as Gauthaman Vishwanathan, Vishwanathan's elder son
- Riyaz Khan as Giridhar Viswanathan, Vishwanathan's second son
- Nedumudi Venu as Damodarji
- Lalu Alex as Narendra Menon, Narmada's father
- Kannan Nair as Srabhikkal Joji
- Rafi as Aiswarya's father
- Nisha Sarang as Pavithran's wife
- Seetha as Lakshmi, Siddharthan's mother
- Vinaya Prasad as Narmada's mother
- K. B. Ganesh Kumar as Pavithran
- Ambika Mohan
- Sajitha Betti
- Valsala Menon
- Manasa Radhakrishnan (child artist) as Sandra
- Shiju as CI Ajith Varghese
- Rajesh Hebbar as Mahadevan
- Kiran Viswanathan Iyer as Girish Viswanathan, Vishwanathan's third son
- Vk Baiju as SI Abhijith

== Soundtrack ==
- "Cinderella Chandame" performed by Karthik, Rimi Tomy
- "Ni Kannilminnum Swapanam" performed by Ranjith, Jyotsna Radhakrishnan
- "Ente Manasin Chippyil " performed by Vijay Yesudas, Swetha Mohan
- "Villaliveeran Oru Sooryan "performed by Vijay Yesudas, S. A. Rajkumar

== Controversy ==
The movie was initially titled 'budhettan' this created a controversy specific Buddhist groups were urging for the banning of the film claiming that it depicted Buddha and Buddhist symbols negatively.
