= Out of Range (film) =

- Theatrical release poster
- Directed by: Johnson V. Devassy
- Story by: Johnson V Devassy; Fahad; Shafeek
- Produced by: Suresh Kumar T Malavika Cine Creations
- Starring: Vishnu Unnikrishnan; Askar Ali; Sumith Samudra; Ajayaghosh; Swathy; Nila Raj; Anjali Aneesh Upasana
- Cinematography: Anish Babu Abbas
- Music by: Rakesh Kesavan; Lonely Doggy
- Release date: 19 February 2016
- Running time: 134 minutes
- Country: India
- Language: Malayalam

Out of Range is a 2016 Indian Malayalam-language comedy drama film directed by Johnson V. Devassy. The film stars Vishnu Unnikrishnan, Askar Ali, Sumith Samudra, and Ajayaghosh in the lead roles with Swamty, Nila Raj, and Anjali Aneesh Upasana in supporting roles. It is produced by Suresh Kumar T. under the banner of Malavika Cine Creations. Anish Babu Abbas does the cinematography while Rakesh Kesavan and Lonely Doggy score the music. The screenplay is written by Devassy along with Shafeek Mohammed and Fahad Shan.

== Plot ==
Jerin (Ajayaghosh), at crossroads with his stagnant love life; Subru (Vishnu Unnikrishnan), fed up with his mom's argumentative nature; Sanjay (Sumith Samudra), all against his reckless job schedule; Aashiq (Askar Ali), annoyed with unending family obligations - are four friends with instability in their lives. On one decisive night, the four friends take an unusual oath, to quit using their mobile phones forever. From the next daybreak, the world around them turns upside down. Sacking, break-up, and resentment follows. After the initial chaos, they seem to enjoy the peace, ease, and all the joys.

However, this is just the beginning of another story. A steely resolve for more adventure, more determination, more drama, and more blows. Will they live to tell the tale?

== Cast ==
- Vishnu Unnikrishnan - Subru
- Askar Ali - Ashik
- Sumith Samudra - Sanjay
- Ajayaghosh – Jerin
- Swathy - Sharon
- Nila Raj - Hazeena
- Anjali Aneesh - Upasana
- Geetha Mathan - Ummichi
- Jayaraj Celluloid - Niyas Ikka
- Sinaj Changanaserry - Ashaan
- Deepika - Amma
- Jaison Panikulangara - Achan
- Gopan Mangat – Boss
- Prathapan K. S. – Raju Bai

== Production ==
The film began production under the name Holy Shit. The film marks the debut of Askar Ali.

== Soundtrack ==
The film's background score and songs are composed by Rakesh Kesavan and Lonely Doggy. Lyrics for the songs are written by Rakesh Menon, Jose Peter and Lonely Doggy. Sachin Warrier Lonely Doggy, M.e.l, Vivzy are the principal singers.

| No. | Title | Artist(s) | Length |
|---|---|---|---|
| 1 | "Nilaave Nilaave (Malayalam Melody)" | Sachin Warrier | 05:21 |
| 2 | "holyshit" (English Rap Song) | Lonely Doggy, M.e.l, Vivzy | 04:20 |
