= List of Malayalam films of 1971 =

The following is a list of Malayalam films released in the year 1971.

Opening		Sl. No.	Film	Cast	Director	Music director	Notes
J A N	8	1	Kalithozhi	Prem Nazir, Sheela	D. M. Pottekkad	G. Devarajan	
J A N	8	2	Moonnupookkal	Prem Nazir, Sathyan	P. Bhaskaran	Pukazhenthi	
J A N	14	3	Avalalpam Vaikippoyi	Prem Nazir, Sheela	John Sankaramangalam	G. Devarajan	
J A N	22	4	Oru Penninte Katha	Sathyan, Sheela	K. S. Sethumadhavan	G. Devarajan	
J A N	22	5	C.I.D. In Jungle	Sathyan, T. S. Muthaiah	G. P. Kammath	Bhagyanath	
J A N	27	6	Makane Ninakku Vendi	Prem Nazir, Sheela	E. N. Balakrishnan	G. Devarajan	
F E B	5	7	Shiksha	Prem Nazir, Sathyan	N. Prakash	G. Devarajan	
F E B	12	8	Neethi	Prem Nazir, Sheela	A. B. Raj		
F E B	26	9	Kuttyedathi	Sathyan, S. P. Pillai	P. N. Menon	M. S. Baburaj	
M A R	12	10	Poompatta	Sridevi, Prema	B. K. Pottekkad	G. Devarajan	
M A R	19	11	Jalakanyaka	Madhu, Kaviyoor Ponnamma	M. S. Mani	A. T. Ummer	
M A R	26	12	Lankadahanam	Prem Nazir, Vijayasree	J. Sasikumar	M. S. Viswanathan	
A P R	9	13	Navavadhu	Prem Nazir, Sharada	P. Bhaskaran	G. Devarajan	
A P R	10	14	Thettu	Sathyan, Sheela, Ummer	K. S. Sethumadhavan	G. Devarajan	
A P R	14	15	Manpeda	Jayabharathi, Jesey	P. M. A. Azeez	M. S. Baburaj	
A P R	14	16	C.I.D. Nazir	Prem Nazir, Jayabharathi	P. Venu	M. K. Arjunan	
A P R	14	17	Karinizhal	Prem Nazir, Sathyan	J. D. Thottan	G. Devarajan	
A P R	30	19	Bobanum Moliyum	Madhu, Vijayasree	J. Sasikumar	Joseph Krishna	
A P R	30	20	Vithukal	Madhu, Sheela	P. Bhaskaran	Pukazhenthi	
M A Y	7	21	Lora Neeyevide	Prem Nazir, KPAC Lalitha	T. R. Raghunath	M. S. Baburaj	
M A Y	7	22	Anadha Shilpangal	Prasad, Sankaradi	M. K. Ramu	R. K. Shekhar	
M A Y	28	23	Muthassi	Prem Nazir, Sheela	P. Bhaskaran	V. Dakshinamoorthy	
J U N	16	24	Rathrivandi	Vincent, Ummer	Vijayanarayanan	M. S. Baburaj	
J U L	2	25	Sarasayya	Sathyan, Madhu	Thoppil Bhasi	G. Devarajan	
J U L	22	26	Aana Valarthiya Vanampadiyude Makan	Gemini Ganesan, Rajasree	P. Subramaniam	K. V. Mahadevan	
J U L	23	27	Achante Bharya	Adoor Bhasi, K. P. Ummer	Thikkurissy Sukumaran Nair	V. Dakshinamoorthy	
A U G	6	28	Anubhavangal Paalichakal	Sathyan, Prem Nazeer	K. S. Sethumadhavan	Devarajan	
A U G	12	29	Aabhijathyam	Madhu, Sharada	A. Vincent	A. T. Ummer	
A U G	13	30	Vimochanasamaram	Sathyan, Sheela	Mohan Gandhiraman	M. B. Sreenivasan	
S E P	2	31	Prathidhawani	Raghavan, Radhamani	Vipin Das	M. L. Srikanth	
S E P	3	32	Panchavan Kaadu	Prem Nazir, Sathyan	Kunchacko	G. Devarajan	
S E P	3	33	Karakanakadal	Sathyan, Madhu	K. S. Sethumadhavan	G. Devarajan	
S E P	3	34	Thapaswini	Prem Nazir, Sheela	M. Krishnan Nair	G. Devarajan	
S E P	24	35	Marunnattil Oru Malayali	Prem Nazir, Adoor Bhasi	A. B. Raj	V. Dakshinamoorthy	
S E P	30	36	Inqulab Zindabbad	Sathyan, Madhu	K. S. Sethumadhavan	G. Devarajan	
O C T	1	37	Vivahasammanam	Prem Nazir, Sheela	J. D. Thottan	G. Devarajan	
O C T	22	38	Prapancham	Sudev, Sunitha	Sudin Menon	Dulalsen	
O C T	29	39	Puthenveedu	Prem Nazir, Sheela	K. Sukumaran Nair	M. S. Baburaj	
N O V	5	40	Sumangali	Sheela, Prasad	M. K. Ramu	R. K. Shekhar	
N O V	5	41	Line Bus	Madhu, Jayabharathi	K. S. Sethumadhavan	G. Devarajan	
N O V	19	42	Ummachu	Madhu, Sheela	P. Bhaskaran	K. Raghavan	
N O V	19	43	Agnimrigam	Prem Nazir, Sathyan	M. Krishnan Nair	G. Devarajan	
N O V	26	44	Sindooracheppu	Madhu, Jayabharathi	Madhu	G. Devarajan	
D E C	3	45	Ernakulam Junction	Prem Nazir, Ragini	Vijayanarayanan	M. S. Baburaj	
D E C	10	46	Yogamullaval	Muthukulam Raghavan Pillai, Shobha	C. V. Shankar	R. K. Shekhar	
D E C	17	47	Gangasangamam	Prem Nazir, Jayabharathi	J. D. Thottan	G. Devarajan	
D E C	24	48	Vilakku Vangiya Veena	Prem Nazir, Madhu	P. Bhaskaran	V. Dakshinamoorthy	
D E C	24	49	Kochaniyathi	Madhu, Jayabharathi	P. Subramaniam	Pukazhenthi	

== Dubbed Films ==
Sl No	Movies	Date	Director	Story	Screenplay	Main actors	Basic Language	Notes
1	Shri Krishna Leela	15/01	Homi Wadia	Bharat Vyas	Homi Wadia	Sachin, Hina	Hindi	
