= Velliyazhcha =

- Directed by: M. M. Nesan and Swathi Ranga Chary
- Written by: Swathi; S. L. Puram Sadanandan (dialogues)
- Produced by: Swathi Ranga Chary of Solar Pictures
- Starring: Sathyan; Madhu; Sharada; Muthukulam Raghavan Pillai
- Cinematography: P. B. Mani
- Edited by: T.R.Sreenivasalu
- Music by: M. S. Baburaj
- Production company: Venus
- Release date: 31 October 1969
- Country: India
- Language: Malayalam

Velliyazhcha is a 1969 Indian Malayalam film, Vellikizhamai (Friday) story written in Tamil by Swathi and translated into Malayalam by S. L. Puram Sadandan, directed by M. M. Nesan and Swathi Ranga Chary and produced by Solar Pictures owned by the Swathi family. The film stars Sathyan, Madhu, Sharada and Muthukulam Raghavan Pillai in the lead roles. M. S. Baburaj composed the musical score and songs. It marked the singing debut of Malayalam cinema's music director Raveendran.

== Cast ==
- Sathyan
- Madhu
- Sharada
- Muthukulam Raghavan Pillai
- Sankaradi
- T. R. Omana
- Paul Vengola
- Ambika
- Bahadoor
- Khadeeja
- Kumari Padmini
- Meena
- Paravoor Bharathan
- Puthuval
- Vallathol Unnikrishnan

== Soundtrack ==
The music was composed by M. S. Baburaj and the lyrics were written by P. Bhaskaran.

No.	Song	Singers	Lyrics	Length (m:ss)
1	"Karayunna Nerathum"	Latha Raju	P. Bhaskaran	
2	"Kettippidichappol"	S. Janaki	P. Bhaskaran	
3	"Paarvana Rajani"	S. Janaki, Raveendran	P. Bhaskaran	
4	"Premathin Seethala"	K. J. Yesudas	P. Bhaskaran	
