= Ambalapravu =

1970 film

- Theatrical Poster
- Directed by: P. Bhaskaran
- Written by: Thappa; S. L. Puram Sadanandan (dialogues)
- Produced by: T. C. Barjathya
- Starring: Prem Nazir; Sheela; Madhu; Sharada
- Cinematography: U. Rajagopal
- Edited by: K. Narayanan; Neelakantan
- Music by: M. S. Baburaj
- Production company: Sargam Pictures (P) Ltd.
- Distributed by: Sargam Pictures (P) Ltd.
- Release date: 7 November 1970
- Country: India
- Language: Malayalam

Ambalapravu is a 1970 Indian Malayalam film, directed by P. Bhaskaran and produced by T.Thara Chand Barjathya. The film stars Prem Nazir, Sheela, Madhu and Sharada in the lead roles. The film had musical score by M. S. Baburaj.

== Cast ==
- Prem Nazir as Udhaya Varma
- Sheela as Sharadha
- Madhu as Rajendran
- Sharada as Indumathi
- Adoor Bhasi as Shankara Pilla
- Kottayam Santha as Nani Amma
- P. J. Antony as Menon
- Sankaradi as Dhamu
- T. R. Omana as Subhadra Thamburatti
- Abbas
- Aranmula Ponnamma as Saraswathi Amma
- Bahadoor as Nalinakshan
- C. A. Balan as Achutha Warrior
- K. P. Ummer as Appunni
- Kaduvakulam Antony
- Khadeeja as Madhavi
- Madhubala
- Meena as Rudhrani
- K. S. Parvathy as Meenakshi Amma
- Paravoor Bharathan
- Philomina
- Puthuval
- Raghava Menon
- Raman
- Ramankutty as Judge
- TKR Bhadran
- Veeran as Adhithya Varma

== Soundtrack ==
The music was composed by M. S. Baburaj and the lyrics were written by P. Bhaskaran.

No.	Song	Singers	Lyrics	Length (m:ss)
1	"Dukhangalkkinnu Njan"	K. J. Yesudas	P. Bhaskaran	
2	"Kuppaayakkeeshamel"	P. Jayachandran	P. Bhaskaran	
3	"Maavupoothu Maathalam Poothu"	S. Janaki	P. Bhaskaran	
4	"Pramadavanathil"	P. Leela	P. Bhaskaran	
5	"Thaane Thirinjum"	S. Janaki	P. Bhaskaran	
