= Vilakuranja Manushyan =

- Directed by: M. A. Rajendran
- Written by: S. L. Puram Sadanandan
- Screenplay by: S. L. Puram Sadanandan
- Produced by: P. Ramaswami
- Starring: Prem Nazir; Madhu; Sharada; Kaviyoor Ponnamma
- Cinematography: K. Ramachandran
- Edited by: E. Arunachalam
- Music by: Pukazhenthi
- Production company: Pazhani Films
- Distributed by: Pazhani Films
- Release date: 15 August 1969
- Country: India
- Language: Malayalam

Vilakuranja Manushyan is a 1969 Indian Malayalam-language film directed by M. A. Rajendran and produced by P. Ramaswami. The film stars Prem Nazir, Madhu, Sharada and Kaviyoor Ponnamma in the lead roles. The film has musical score by Pukazhenthi.

== Cast ==
- Prem Nazir
- Madhu
- Sharada
- Kaviyoor Ponnamma
- Adoor Bhasi
- Manavalan Joseph
- Pappukutty Bhagavathar
- K. P. Ummer
- Khadeeja
- Kottarakkara Sreedharan Nair
- Lakshmi
- Paravoor Bharathan
- K. V. Shanthi
- Vijayakala

== Soundtrack ==
The music was composed by Pukazhenthi and the lyrics were written by P. Bhaskaran.

No.	Song	Singers	Lyrics	Length (m:ss)
1	"Ente Kannil"	S. Janaki	P. Bhaskaran	
2	"Gopurakkilivaathilil"	K. J. Yesudas	P. Bhaskaran	
3	"Madhyaahna Sundara"	S. Janaki	P. Bhaskaran	
4	"Nizhal Naadakathile"	K. J. Yesudas	P. Bhaskaran	
5	"Swantham Hridayathinullarayil"	K. J. Yesudas	P. Bhaskaran	
