= Anguram =

- Directed by: Hariharan
- Screenplay by: Hariharan
- Produced by: Adoor Manikantan
- Starring: Prem Nazir; Sharada; Sukumaran; KP Ummer
- Cinematography: Melli Irani
- Edited by: M. S. Mani
- Music by: M. S. Viswanathan
- Production company: Chellamani Films
- Distributed by: Chellamani Films
- Release date: 8 April 1982
- Country: India
- Language: Malayalam

Anguram is a 1982 Indian Malayalam film, directed by Hariharan and produced by Adoor Manikantan. The film stars Prem Nazir, Sharada, Sukumaran, KP Ummer and Kottayam Santha.

== Plot ==
Anguram is a remake of 1973 Hindi movie Namak Haraam.

== Cast ==
- Prem Nazir as Jayan
- Sharada as Malini
- Sukumaran as Babu
- K. P. Ummer as Babu's father
- Kottayam Santha as Jayan's mother
- Bahadoor as Keshavadas
- G. K. Pillai as Govindan
- Kaduvakulam Antony as Paraman
- Kunjandi as Kuttan Pilla
- Nellikode Bhaskaran as Gopalan
- Oduvil Unnikrishnan as Pillai
- Reena as Raji
- Sripriya as Madhavi
- Bhaskara Kurup as Bhaskaran
- Pushpa

== Soundtrack ==
The music was composed by M. S. Viswanathan and the lyrics were written by O. N. V. Kurup.

No.	Song	Singers	Lyrics	Length (m:ss)
1	"Manushyan"	P. Jayachandran	O. N. V. Kurup	
2	"Omar Khayyaam Varu"	P. Jayachandran, K. P. Brahmanandan	O. N. V. Kurup	
3	"Thakkili Thakkili"	P. Susheela	O. N. V. Kurup	
4	"Thuyilunaru"	P. Susheela, P. Jayachandran, Chorus	O. N. V. Kurup	
