= Appooppan =

- Promotional Poster
- Directed by: P. Bhaskaran
- Written by: S. L. Puram Sadanandan
- Produced by: Murugan
- Starring: Thikkurissy Sukumaran Nair; Kamal Haasan; Jayabharathi; Sumithra
- Cinematography: S. J. Thomas
- Edited by: K. Sankunni
- Music by: M. S. Baburaj
- Production company: Murugan Movies
- Distributed by: Evershine Productions
- Release date: 13 February 1976
- Country: India
- Language: Malayalam

Appooppan (also known as Charithram Aavarthikkunnilla before release) (transl. Grandfather) is a 1976 Indian Malayalam-language film, directed by P. Bhaskaran, starring Thikkurissy Sukumaran Nair, Jayabharathi, Sumithra and Kamal Haasan. The film was a remake of the Telugu film Tata Manavadu.

== Cast ==
- Thikkurissy Sukumaran Nair as Velu Nair
- Kamal Haasan as Babu
- Jayabharathi as Bindu
- Sumithra as Radha, Amminikutty (double role)
- Sankaradi as Sankaran Menon
- Sukumari as Bharathi
- Kaviyoor Ponnamma as Sarasvathi
- K. P. Ummer as Gopinath
- Adoor Bhasi as Vishwanatha Menon
- Prathapachandran as Money lender
- Master Raghu (Karan) as young Babu
- Baby Indira as young Amminikutty
- Manjeri Chandran as Venu
- Rajasulochana as Malini

== Production ==
Appooppan film was directed by P. Bhaskaran, produced by Murugan under the production banner "Murugan Movies". It is a remake of the 1973 Telugu film Tata Manavadu. The film was given an "U" (Unrestricted) certificate by the Central Board of Film Certification and the final length of the film was 4,457.12 metres (14,623.1 ft).

The film Appooppan was announced as Charithram Aavarthikkunnilla and the film's posters and LP records covers also carried the same name. The title change to Appooppan happened just within 1 week before the film's theatrical release. There is a misconception that Appooppan and Charitram Aavarthikkunnilla are two different films.

== Soundtrack ==
Appooppan
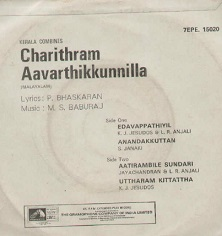

Soundtrack album by M. S. Baburaj
- Released: 1976
- Genre: Feature film soundtrack
- Label: EMI; The Gramaphone Company of India Limited

The film Appooppan was previously named as Charithram Aavarthikkunnilla and the LP records covers also carried the same name. The music was composed by M. S. Baburaj.

No.	Song	Singers	Lyrics
1	"Idavappaathikku Kudayillaathe..."	K. J. Yesudas, L. R. Anjali	P. Bhaskaran
2	"Anandakkuttaninnu Pirannaalu..."	S. Janaki	P. Bhaskaran
3	"Aattirambile Sundari..."	Jayachandran, L. R. Anjali	P. Bhaskaran
4	"Utharam Kittaatha Chodyam..."	K. J. Yesudas	P. Bhaskaran
5	"Lokam Vallaatha Lokam..."	K. J. Yesudas, L. R. Anjali	P. Bhaskaran
6	"Nilledi Nilledi Neeyallayo..."	P. Leela, Raveendran, C. O. Anto	P. Bhaskaran
