= Nadeenadanmare Avasyamundu =

- Directed by: Crossbelt Mani
- Written by: Dr. Balakrishnan
- Screenplay by: Dr. Balakrishnan
- Produced by: C. P. Sreedharan; P. Appu Nair
- Starring: Vincent; KP Ummer; Rajakokila; Sumithra
- Cinematography: Haridas
- Edited by: Chakrapani
- Music by: R. K. Shekhar
- Production company: United Movies
- Distributed by: United Movies
- Release date: 27 September 1974
- Country: India
- Language: Malayalam

Nadeenadanmare Avasyamundu is a 1974 Indian Malayalam-language film, directed by Crossbelt Mani and produced by C. P. Sreedharan and P. Appu Nair. The film stars Adoor Bhasi, Thikkurissy Sukumaran Nair, Kottayam Santha and Manavalan Joseph. The film has musical score by R. K. Shekhar.

== Cast ==
- Vincent
- K. P. Ummer
- Sumithra
- Rajakokila
- Bahadoor
- Adoor Bhasi
- Thikkurissy Sukumaran Nair
- Kottayam Santha
- Manavalan Joseph
- Sreelatha Namboothiri
- Nilambur Balan
- Ramdas
- A. Madhavan
- A. K. Unni
- Alummoodan
- Girija
- Jayakumari
- KPAC Sunny
- Kuthiravattam Pappu
- Mallika Sukumaran
- Meena
- Paravoor Bharathan
- Sadhana
- Sibad
- T. R. Radhakrishnan
- Thresya
- Veeran

== Soundtrack ==
The music was composed by R. K. Shekhar and the lyrics were written by Vayalar Ramavarma.

| No. | Song | Singers | Lyrics | Length (m:ss) |
|---|---|---|---|---|
| 1 | "Chanchalamizhi" | K. P. Brahmanandan, Gopalakrishnan | Vayalar Ramavarma | |
| 2 | "Chendumalli" | P. Susheela | Vayalar Ramavarma | |
| 3 | "Paahi Jagadambike" | K. P. Brahmanandan, Kumari Rajalakshmi | Vayalar Ramavarma | |
| 4 | "Pacha Nellikka" | P. Jayachandran, Kasthoori, Gopalakrishnan | Vayalar Ramavarma | |
| 5 | "Sumukhi Sundari" | K. J. Yesudas | Vayalar Ramavarma | |
| 6 | "Vrindaavanam Ithu" | K. J. Yesudas, Chorus | Vayalar Ramavarma | |
