= Thara (film) =

- Directed by: M. Krishnan Nair
- Written by: P. K. Sarangapani; S. L. Puram Sadanandan (dialogues)
- Produced by: M. Kunchacko
- Starring: Prem Nazir; Sathyan; Sharada; Jayabharathi
- Cinematography: C. Ramachandra Menon
- Edited by: S. P. S. Veerappan
- Music by: G. Devarajan
- Production company: Excel Productions
- Distributed by: Excel Productions
- Release date: 18 December 1970
- Country: India
- Language: Malayalam

Thara is a 1970 Indian Malayalam-language film, directed by M. Krishnan Nair and produced by M. Kunchacko. The film stars Prem Nazir, Sathyan, Sharada and Usha. The film had musical score by G. Devarajan. The lead actress, Sharada, plays a double role in the film, portraying two distinct characters named Vasanthi and the titular Thara.

== Cast ==
- Prem Nazir as Venugopalan
- Sathyan as Balakrishna Pilla
- Sharada (double role) as Vasanthi/Thara
- Jayabharathi as Usha
- KPAC Lalitha
- Adoor Bhasi as Velupilla
- Thikkurissy Sukumaran Nair as Keshavan Kutty
- Adoor Bhavani as Pankajam
- Adoor Pankajam as Hostel Warden
- Alummoodan as Pappu
- Aranmula Ponnamma as Kamalamma
- K. P. Ummer as Gopinathan Nair
- Kottayam Chellappan as Vikraman Pilla
- Pankajavalli as Matron
- S. P. Pillai as Ayyappan
- Vijaya Kumari as Kalikutty
- Changanassery Natarajan

== Soundtrack ==
The music was composed by G. Devarajan and the lyrics were written by Vayalar Ramavarma.

No.	Song	Singers	Lyrics	Length (m:ss)
1	"Kaalidaasan Marichu"	K. J. Yesudas	Vayalar Ramavarma	
2	"Kaaverippoonthennale"	P. Susheela	Vayalar Ramavarma	
3	"Mannil Pennaay"	B. Vasantha	Vayalar Ramavarma	
4	"Nunakkuzhikkavilil"	P. Jayachandran	Vayalar Ramavarma	
5	"Utharaayanakkili Paadi"	K. J. Yesudas	Vayalar Ramavarma	
