= Kaduvaye Pidicha Kiduva =

- Directed by: A. B. Raj
- Written by: S. L. Puram Sadanandan
- Screenplay by: S. L. Puram Sadanandan
- Produced by: T. E. Vasudevan
- Starring: Prem Nazir; Sukumari; Adoor Bhasi; Lakshmi
- Cinematography: C. Namasivayam
- Edited by: B. S. Mani
- Music by: V. Dakshinamoorthy
- Production company: Jaya Maruthi
- Distributed by: Jaya Maruthi
- Release date: 25 March 1977
- Country: India
- Language: Malayalam

Kaduvaye Pidicha Kiduva is a 1977 Indian Malayalam film, directed by A. B. Raj and produced by T. E. Vasudevan. It stars Prem Nazir, Sukumari, Adoor Bhasi and Lakshmi in the lead roles. The musical score was by V. Dakshinamoorthy.

== Cast ==
- Prem Nazir
- Sukumari
- Adoor Bhasi
- Lakshmi
- Sam
- Sankaradi
- Sreemoolanagaram Vijayan
- G. K. Pillai
- Jayamalini
- K. P. Ummer
- P. K. Abraham
- Paravoor Bharathan
- Veeran
- Vijayalalitha

== Soundtrack ==
The music was composed by V. Dakshinamoorthy and the lyrics were written by Sreekumaran Thampi.

No.	Song	Singers	Lyrics	Length (m:ss)
1	"Chiriyo Chiri"	K. J. Yesudas	Sreekumaran Thampi	
2	"Mounamithenthe Maayaavi"	Vani Jairam	Sreekumaran Thampi	
3	"Neelaanjanamalayilu Neeli"	K. J. Yesudas	Sreekumaran Thampi	
4	"Oru Swapnathil"	P. Susheela	Sreekumaran Thampi	
