= Rajamalli =

- Directed by: R. S. Prabhu
- Written by: Muthukulam Raghavan Pillai
- Screenplay by: Muthukulam Raghavan Pillai
- Produced by: R. S. Prabhu
- Starring: Prem Nazir; Sharada; Sukumari; Kottayam Santha
- Cinematography: A. Venkat
- Edited by: G. Venkittaraman
- Music by: B. A. Chidambaranath
- Production company: Janatha Productions
- Distributed by: Janatha Productions
- Release date: 3 September 1965
- Country: India
- Language: Malayalam

Rajamalli is a 1965 Indian Malayalam film, directed and produced by R. S. Prabhu. The film stars Prem Nazir, Sharada, Sukumari and Kottayam Santha in the lead roles. The film featured a musical score by B. A. Chidambaranath.

== Cast ==
- Prem Nazir
- Sharada
- Sukumari
- Kottayam Santha
- Subhadra
- T. S. Muthaiah
- Malathi
- Abbas
- G. K. Pillai
- J. A. R. Anand
- Paravoor Bharathan

== Soundtrack ==
The music was composed by B. A. Chidambaranath and the lyrics were written by P. Bhaskaran.

No.	Song	Singers	Lyrics	Length (m:ss)
1	"Jayakaali"	K. J. Yesudas, S. Janaki	P. Bhaskaran	
2	"Kaatte Vaa"	P. Leela	P. Bhaskaran	
3	"Karppoora Thenmaavil"	S. Janaki	P. Bhaskaran	
4	"Kunninmele Neeyenikku"	S Janaki	P. Bhaskaran	
5	"Kuppivala"	A. M. Rajah	P. Bhaskaran	
6	"Neelamukilukal"	S. Janaki	P. Bhaskaran	
