= Snehadeepame Mizhi Thurakku =

- Poster
- Directed by: P. Bhaskaran
- Written by: Tarasankar Bandyopadhyay (story); S. L. Puram Sadanandan (dialogues)
- Screenplay by: S. L. Puram Sadanandan
- Produced by: S. L. Nafatha; S. Saunthappan
- Starring: Madhu; Sharada; Kaviyoor Ponnamma; Adoor Bhasi
- Cinematography: S. J. Thomas
- Edited by: Chakrapani
- Music by: Pukazhenthi
- Production company: Sreekanth Productions
- Distributed by: Rajshri Release
- Release date: 12 October 1972
- Country: India
- Language: Malayalam

Snehadeepame Mizhi Thurakku is a 1972 Indian Malayalam-language film directed by P. Bhaskaran. The film stars Madhu, Sharada, Kaviyoor Ponnamma and Adoor Bhasi in the lead roles. The film has musical score by Pukazhenthi.

== Cast ==
- Madhu
- Sharada
- Kaviyoor Ponnamma
- Adoor Bhasi
- Sankaradi
- T. R. Omana
- Sujatha

== Soundtrack ==
The music was composed by Pukazhenthi and the lyrics were written by P. Bhaskaran.

No.	Song	Singers	Lyrics	Length (m:ss)
1	"Chaithramaasathile"	K. J. Yesudas	P. Bhaskaran	
2	"Lokam Muzhuvan"	S. Janaki	P. Bhaskaran	
3	"Lokam Muzhuvan"	S. Janaki, K. P. Brahmanandan, Raveendran, B. Vasantha	P. Bhaskaran	
4	"Naadakam Theernnu"	S. Janaki	P. Bhaskaran	
5	"Ninte Mizhikal"	K. J. Yesudas	P. Bhaskaran	
6	"Ninte Shareeram"	K. J. Yesudas	P. Bhaskaran	
7	"Rogangalillaatha"	K. J. Yesudas, Chorus	P. Bhaskaran	
