= Muthalali =

1965 Malayalam language film

- Directed by: M. A. V. Rajendran
- Story by: A. K. Venkatramanujam
- Produced by: M. A. Venu
- Starring: Prem Nazir; Sheela; Thikkurissy Sukumaran Nair; Kumari Padmini; T. S. Muthaiah; Pappukutty Bhagavathar; Kottayam Santha; S. P. Pillai; Aranmula Ponnamma,
- Cinematography: K. Ramachandran
- Edited by: E. Arunachalam
- Music by: Pukazhenthi
- Distributed by: Brother's Pictures
- Release date: 30 April 1965
- Country: India
- Language: Malayalam

Muthalali is a 1965 Malayalam language film directed by M. A. V. Rajendran. It stars Prem Nazir, Sheela, T. S. Muthaiah and Thikkurissy Sukumaran Nair. Muthalali is inspired by the Tamil language film of the same name.

The Tamil film Muthalali (1957), produced by M. A. Venu and directed by "Muktha" Sreenivasan made on a small budget, was a huge hit. The film won the National Award for the best Feature Film in the regional language category. It was the screen version of a popular play by the same name, written by A. K. Venkataramanujam. The unprecedented success of the film was attributed to its good script combined with strong mass elements like songs and performances.

The producers remade the film in Malayalam with the same title. It was released on 30 April 1965. Directed by M. A. V. Rajendran, the film was shot at Rathna Studios, Salem. Dance sequences choreographed by "Chinni" Sampath were an attraction of the film. Music director K. V. Mahadevan, who composed the music for the original recommended his assistant T. K. Pukazhenthi's name to compose for the remake. Playback singer B. Vasantha made her debut in Malayalam films through this film.

== Plot ==
Venu who owns a glass factory in Ernakulam goes to America for higher studies. During Venu's absence his mother, Saraswathi Amma, manages the factory with the help of the manager Vikraman Nair. Taking advantage of Saraswathi Amma's trust in him, Vikraman gradually brings everything under his control and swindles the company.

After a few years Venu returns after his studies. He lands in Bombay en route to Ernakulam where he meets Kesavan, a hotel employee. Through Kesavan he comprehends the hardships faced by labourers and the need to understand the life of a worker before becoming the owner of a factory. Venu sends a telegram to his mother informing her that he has to go on a business tour and will reach home a month later.

Venu reaches Ernakulam, in disguise as Velu, and gets himself a job in his own factory with the help of Devaki, a worker in the factory. Venu befriends her father, Raman Nair, and stays in their home.

Venu gets a clear picture of what Vikraman Nair is up to and how he manipulates the factory's assets. Vikraman, in the meanwhile, is in love with Malathi who Venu was supposed to marry. Venu falls in love with Devaki.

Within a few days, Venu gets a clear picture of the crisis the factory is passing through. Vikraman's wicked eye falls on Devaki. Venu decides it is time to return as himself. He leaves after writing a letter to Devaki saying that he will come back soon. Devaki becomes suspicious of Venu's motives. Devaki is dismissed from her job in the factory.

She leaves the city in search of Venu and reaches Thiruvananthapuram. There she meets her brother Kesavan, the hotel worker who Venu met in Bombay.

Venu returns and takes charge of the factory. He is disappointed upon discovering that Devaki has been dismissed and that she has left the home. He meets the workers in his factory, tells them that he is aware of the manager's behaviour and assures them that there will be a change in how the factory is run.

Unable to come to terms with being shown his place in the factory, Vikraman spreads a rumour that Venu is an impostor Velu.

Meanwhile, Venu sets out in search of Devaki and brings her back. He is arrested on charges of impersonation on a complaint by Vikraman. All misunderstandings are cleared. Venu reveals the purpose behind coming back in a disguise and exposes Vikraman Nair. The police arrest Vikraman for swindling the factory. Venu marries Devaki. The workers of the factory are now under a "Muthalali" (owner), who understands the hardships they face and acknowledges their rights.

== Cast ==
- Prem Nazir as Venu/Velu
- Sheela (credited as Sheeladevi) as Devaki
- T. S. Muthaiah as Vikraman Nair
- Kumari Padmini as Malathi
- Aranmula Ponnamma as Saraswathi Amma
- Thikkurissy Sukumaran Nair as Raman Nair
- S. P. Pillai as Paramu
- Kottayam Santha as Meenashi
- Pappukutty Bhagavathar as Kesavan
- Panjabi as Sankaran
- Santo Krishnan as Watchman

== Soundtrack ==
The music was composed by Pukazhenthi and the lyrics were written by P. Bhaskaran.

No.	Song	Singers	Lyrics	Length (m:ss)
1	"Ethu Poovu Choodanam"	S. Janaki	P. Bhaskaran	
2	"Kaniyaanum Vannilla"	S. Janaki	P. Bhaskaran	
3	"Mullappoothailamittu"	K. J. Yesudas, S. Janaki	P. Bhaskaran	
4	"Panineeru Thoovunna"	K. J. Yesudas	P. Bhaskaran	
5	"Ponnaara Muthalaali"	S. Janaki, B. Vasantha, Soolamangalam Rajalakshmi	P. Bhaskaran	
