= Bhagyamudra =

- Film poster
- Directed by: M. A. V. Rajendran
- Written by: S. L. Puram Sadanandan
- Produced by: P. Ramaswamy
- Starring: Prem Nazeer; Meenakumari; Adoor Bhasi
- Music by: Pukazhenthi
- Production company: Pazhani Films
- Release date: 21 July 1967
- Country: India
- Language: Malayalam

Bhagyamudra (transl. The Mark of Fortune) is a 1967 Indian Malayalam-language film written by S. L. Puram Sadanandan and directed by M. A. V. Rajendran. It stars Prem Nazeer, Sukumari, Adoor Bhasi, Muthukulam Raghavan Pillai, Manavalan Joseph, Kottayam Shantha, Kalavathi, G. K. Pillai, K. R. Vijaya, Sukumari, C. R. Lakshmy, Devaki and Baby Shakeela. The movie is a remake of the 1954 Bengali movie Chheley Kaar.

== Cast ==
- Prem Nazir
- Sukumari
- Adoor Bhasi
- Kottayam Santha
- Manavalan Joseph
- Muthukulam Raghavan Pillai
- Baby Shakeela
- C. R. Lakshmi
- Devaki
- G. K. Pillai
- K. R. Vijaya
- Kalavathi
- Meena

== Soundtrack ==
The music was composed by Pukazhenthi and the lyrics were written by P. Bhaskaran.

No.	Song	Singers	Lyrics	Length (m:ss)
1	"Ethu Koottil Nee"	S. Janaki	P. Bhaskaran	
2	"Indranandanavaadiyil"	L. R. Eeswari, P. B. Sreenivas	P. Bhaskaran	
3	"Maampazhakkoottathil"	K. J. Yesudas	P. Bhaskaran	
4	"MadhurapratheekshathanK	K. J. Yesudas, S. Janaki	P. Bhaskaran	
5	"Mannaankattayum Kariyilayum"	M. S. Rajeswari	P. Bhaskaran	
6	"Peraarum Periyaarum"	L. R. Eeswari, Chorus	P. Bhaskaran	
