= Kanyaadaanam =

- Directed by: Hariharan
- Written by: Thuravoor Moorthy; S. L. Puram Sadanandan (dialogues)
- Produced by: C. C. Baby
- Starring: Prem Nazir; Madhu; Sharada; Kaviyoor Ponnamma
- Cinematography: T. N. Krishnankutty Nair
- Edited by: V. P. Krishnan
- Music by: M. K. Arjunan
- Production company: MS Productions
- Distributed by: MS Productions
- Release date: 12 August 1976
- Country: India
- Language: Malayalam

Kanyaadaanam is a 1976 Indian Malayalam-language film directed by Hariharan and produced by C. C. Baby. The film stars Prem Nazir, Madhu, Sharada and Kaviyoor Ponnamma in the lead roles. The film has musical score by M. K. Arjunan. The film was a remake of Tamil film Padithaal Mattum Podhuma.

== Cast ==
- Prem Nazir
- Madhu
- Sharada
- Kaviyoor Ponnamma
- Adoor Bhasi
- Sankaradi
- Sreelatha Namboothiri
- Bahadoor
- Meena
- Nellikode Bhaskaran
- Tom John
- Vidhubala

== Soundtrack ==
The music was composed by M. K. Arjunan and the lyrics were written by Sreekumaran Thampi.

No.	Song	Singers	Lyrics	Length (m:ss)
1	"Aadaathe Thalarunna"	K. J. Yesudas	Sreekumaran Thampi	
2	"Randu Nakshathrangal Kandumutti"	K. J. Yesudas	Sreekumaran Thampi	
3	"Randu Nakshathrangal Kandumutti" (F)	P. Susheela	Sreekumaran Thampi	
4	"Swarangal Nin Priya"	P. Jayachandran	Sreekumaran Thampi	
5	"Vaasarasankalpathin"	Vani Jairam, Chorus	Sreekumaran Thampi	
6	"Vidhumukhi Nin"	K. J. Yesudas	Sreekumaran Thampi	
