= Arayannam =

- Directed by: P. Gopikumar
- Written by: P. Chandrakumar; Ravi Vilangan (dialogues)
- Screenplay by: Ravi Vilangan
- Starring: Sukumari; Sathar; Sukumaran; Jagannatha Varma
- Cinematography: V. C. Sasi
- Edited by: G. Murali
- Music by: Pukazhenthi
- Production company: Chithragadha
- Distributed by: Chithragadha
- Release date: 23 January 1981
- Country: India
- Language: Malayalam

Arayannam is a 1981 Indian Malayalam film, directed by P. Gopikumar. The film stars Sukumari, Sathar, Sukumaran and Jagannatha Varma in the lead roles. The film has musical score by Pukazhenthi.

== Cast ==
- Sukumari as Nalini's mother
- Sathaar as Raghu
- Sukumaran as Madhu
- Jagannatha Varma as Sekhara Menon
- Jalaja as Devi
- Madhu Malini as Nalini
- Mala Aravindan as Antony
- Master Rajeev as Murali
- Raji as Radha
- Santhakumari as Madhu's mother
- Sreenath as Vijayan
- T. G. Ravi as Captain Rajan

== Soundtrack ==
The music was composed by Pukazhenthi and the lyrics were written by P. Bhaskaran.

No.	Song	Singers	Lyrics	Length (m:ss)
1	"Alakaapuriyile"	Vani Jairam	P. Bhaskaran	
2	"Doore Doore Doore"	P. Jayachandran	P. Bhaskaran	
3	"Kanaka Gagana"	K. J. Yesudas	P. Bhaskaran	
4	"Sheethalamaam Vennilaavu"	K. J. Yesudas	P. Bhaskaran	
