= Society Lady =

- Directed by: A. B. Raj
- Written by: S. L. Puram Sadanandan
- Produced by: Areefa Enterprises
- Starring: Madhu; Sharada; Kaviyoor Ponnamma; Thikkurissy Sukumaran Nair
- Music by: K. J. Joy
- Release date: 3 March 1978
- Country: India
- Language: Malayalam

Society Lady is a 1978 Indian Malayalam-language film, directed by A. B. Raj and produced by Areefa Enterprises. The film stars Madhu, Sharada, Kaviyoor Ponnamma and Thikkurissy Sukumaran Nair. The film has musical score by K. J. Joy.

== Cast ==
- Madhu
- Sharada
- Kaviyoor Ponnamma
- Thikkurissy Sukumaran Nair
- Bahadoor
- K. P. Ummer
- Vidhubala
- Vijayalalitha
- Vincent

== Soundtrack ==
The music was composed by K. J. Joy and the lyrics were written by Mankombu Gopalakrishnan.

| No. | Song | Singers | Lyrics | Length (m:ss) |
|---|---|---|---|---|
| 1 | "Aarattu Maholsavam" | P. Jayachandran | Mankombu Gopalakrishnan | |
| 2 | "Karimbu Villu" | Vani Jairam, Chorus | Mankombu Gopalakrishnan | |
| 3 | "Sringaara Yamangal" | K. J. Yesudas | Mankombu Gopalakrishnan | |
| 4 | "Vaakamalarkkaavile" | K. J. Yesudas | Mankombu Gopalakrishnan | |
