= Kallichellamma =

- Theatrical poster
- Directed by: P. Bhaskaran
- Based on: Kallichellamma by G. Vivekanandan
- Produced by: Sobhana Parameswaran Nair
- Starring: Prem Nazir; Madhu; Sheela; Adoor Bhasi
- Cinematography: U. Rajagopal
- Edited by: K. Narayanan; K. Sankunni
- Music by: K. Raghavan
- Production company: Roopavani Films
- Release date: 22 August 1969
- Country: India
- Language: Malayalam

Kallichellamma is a 1969 Indian Malayalam-language film, directed by P. Bhaskaran. It is based on the novel of the same name by G. Vivekanandan. The film stars Prem Nazir, Madhu, Sheela and Adoor Bhasi. It was released on 22 August 1969. Sheela received the Kerala State Film Award for Best Actress for her role in this film. The film was produced by Sobhana Parameswaran Nair.

A sequel, Arikkari Ammu, by Sreekumaran Thampi was released in 1981. This is one of the few films in which Nazir played villain.

== Plot ==
Chellamma is an orphan living in a small house situated in the compound of a landlord in the village. She was an illegitimate child of her late mother. Her mother on her death bed requested her friend Valli Akka to care for Chellamma and advised Chellamma never lose her chastity like her mother. As a grownup, Chellamma is a bold and independent woman who works hard for a living. Many men in the village try in vain to make some sexual advances towards her. Men who covet Chellamma include the landlord and Asarakannu Muthalali, a rowdy.

On a rainy day a dam which separates the paddy fields and the lake breaks and paddy field gets flooded with water. To pump the water out of the fields, villagers bring a pumping machine from the town. A Christian man arrives in the village as the pump operator. One day the landlord tries to evict Chellamma from her house, she resists and the pump operator helps her to protect her hut from the landlord. Hereafter, Chellamma feels a positive affection towards the pump operator. One night during the festival, the pump operator comes to Chellamma's house and forces her to have sex with him. Chellamma initially resists, but they both eventually succumbs to the libido. Next morning, he leaves the village after promising Chellamma that he would come back soon to marry her.

Chellamma becomes pregnant. Valli Akka advises her to abort the pregnancy, but she refuses. All people in the village start hating Chellamma because of her illegitimate pregnancy. Vally Akka and one of her friend help Chellamma during these tough days of her life. Chellamma faces some medical complexities during parturition. Some good-hearted people in the village bring her to the hospital. Chellamma survives, but her infant dies. Asarakannu Muthalali visits Chellamma in the hospital and helps her financially and shows some sympathy towards her.

Chellamma comes back home after recovering her health. One day Asarakannu Muthalali visits Chellamma in her home and tries to rape her. While resisting him, she tells him that she considers him as her brother, on hearing this, Asarakannu feels bad about himself. When he comes out of Chellamma's house, the pump operator arrives there in a drunken state. On seeing Chellamma with Asarakannu, he loses his mind. He and Asarakannu fight and he stabs Asarakannu. On hearing Chellamma's cries, people gather around her house. Villagers catch the pump operator and tie him to a coconut tree in Chellamma's yard. They bring Asarakannu to the hospital. On seeing the police coming to fetch the pump operator, he seeks the help of Chellamma to get released from the knot. Chellamma cuts the rope and releases him. He escapes, on seeing this people become more furious towards her.

Asarakannu Muthalali survives the injury. He comes back to the village in search of the pump operator to take his revenge. He enquirers Chellamma about the pump operator and threatens her that he will kill the pump operator one day. One day the pump operator, now working as a quarry worker gets severely injured in an accident. Chellamma learns of this and visits him in the hospital. One of his arms is broken in the accident. Chellamma goes with him leaving behind her house. She works and earns money to satisfy his belly. Some days he gets drunk and accuses Chellamma of an illegitimate relationship with Asarakannu. Chellamma painfully endures his bad words.

One day, Asarakannu sees Chellamma selling fruits. On seeing him she flees, he follows her and reaches her house. Asarakannu starts physically fighting with the pump operator. Asarakannu wins the fight and tries to kill the pump operator, Chellamma hold his legs and begs to spare her husband's life. On seeing her tears, Asarakannu leaves him unharmed.

One day a weak lady and her two children come to Chellamma's house. Chellamma realises that they are the wife and children of the pump operator. On seeing them, the pump operator becomes furious and tries to evict them from the house. Chellamma interferes and saves the poor woman and her children, she brings them inside. The woman says all that happened was her mistake. Chellamma consoles her and says "our mistake is nothing but being women in this world". The pump operator arrives the house in a drunken state, he tries to kill his first wife, but on seeing his daughter, his mind changes. He hugs the child and starts crying in remorse. On seeing the happy reunification of the family, Chellamma feels both joy and pain at the same time. She leaves the house in the night.

She arrives at her old home. She fetches a poisonous fruit and eats it deliberately. In her last moment, she feels like her mother is calling her. She tells her mother that she is thirsty. Her mother's sound tells her to fetch a coconut from her 'Chudalathengu' (a coconut tree planted on her mother's grave immediately after the funeral) and drinks the coconut water. She fetches a coconut from the tree using a long stick. While trying to break the coconut, the landlord and his people arrive at the scene and accuse her of theft of coconuts from their property. They start parading her to the police station with the fallen coconut bunch on her head. She collapses and dies thirsty with the coconuts from the chudalathengu scattered around her.

== Cast ==
- Sheela as Chellamma
- Adoor Bhavani as Valli Akka
- Meena as Karthi akka
- Prem Nazir as Kunjachan, the pump operator
- Madhu as Asrankannu Muthalali
- Adoor Bhasi
- Sankaradi
- Jesey
- K. P. Pillai
- Latheef
- Abbas
- Khadeeja
- Kuttan Pillai
- M. L. Saraswathi
- Master Pramod as Kochu Raman
- Veeran
- Kottayam Santha
- Nabeesa
- Pala Thankam
- Paravoor Bharathan as Vasu Annan
- Kottarakkara Sreedharan Nair as Gopi
- Sankar Menon
- Thodupuzha Radhakrishnan
- Thomas Mani
- Padmarajan in his only film appearance.

== Soundtrack ==
The music was composed by K. Raghavan and the lyrics were written by P. Bhaskaran.. The soundtrack also features traditional music.

Song	Singers	Lyrics
"Ashokavanathile"	Kamukara, B. Vasantha	P. Bhaskaran
"Kaalamenna Kaaranavarkku"	P. Leela, C. O. Anto, Kottayam Santha, Sreelatha Namboothiri	P. Bhaskaran
"Karimukilkkaattile"	P. Jayachandran	P. Bhaskaran
"Kunnamkulangare"	Adoor Bhavani	Traditional
"Maanathekkaayalin"	K. P. Brahmanandan	P. Bhaskaran
"Unniganapathiye"	M. G. Radhakrishnan, Chorus, C. O. Anto	P. Bhaskaran

== Box office ==
The film was a commercial success.
