= Arakkallan Mukkalkkallan =

1974 Indian film

- Directed by: P. Bhaskaran
- Written by: N. Govindankutty
- Screenplay by: N. Govindankutty
- Produced by: M. P. Rao; M. R. K. Moorthy
- Starring: Prem Nazir; Adoor Bhasi; Jayabharathi; Srividya
- Cinematography: U. Rajagopal
- Edited by: K. Sankunni
- Music by: V. Dakshinamoorthy
- Production company: Prathap Arts Pictures
- Distributed by: Prathap Arts Pictures
- Release date: 20 December 1974
- Country: India
- Language: Malayalam

Arakkallan Mukkalkkallan is a 1974 Indian Malayalam-language film directed by P. Bhaskaran and produced by M. P. Rao and M. R. K. Moorthy. The film stars Prem Nazir, Adoor Bhasi, Jayabharathi and Srividya in the lead roles. The film has musical score by V. Dakshinamoorthy.

== Cast ==
- Prem Nazir as Nagan/Arakallkan
- Adoor Bhasi as Aruvikkara Thampy/Mukkalkallan
- Jayabharathi as Princess Mankamma / Maala
- Srividya as Princess Alli
- K. P. Ummer as Ugran Varma
- Kaviyoor Ponnamma as Queen Lakshmi
- Bahadoor as Nanu
- Paul Vengola
- KPAC Lalitha as Kaavu
- T. R. Omana
- T. S. Muthaiah
- Kunchan
- Sreelatha Namboothiri as Kunjamma
- Kaduvakulam Antony
- N. Govindankutty
- Philomina
- Radhamani
- Vijayalalitha

== Soundtrack ==
The music was composed by V. Dakshinamoorthy and the lyrics were written by P. Bhaskaran.

No.	Song	Singers	Lyrics	Length
1	"Kaaman Pushpadalangal"	V. Dakshinamoorthy	P. Bhaskaran	
2	"Kaathilla Poothilla"	Chorus, Sreelatha Namboothiri	P. Bhaskaran	
3	"Kanakasimhaasanathil"	K. J. Yesudas, P. Jayachandran	P. Bhaskaran	
4	"Mullappoom Pallilo"	K. J. Yesudas, S. Janaki	P. Bhaskaran	
5	"Naranayingane"	S. Janaki	P. Bhaskaran	
6	"Ninte Mizhiyil"	K. J. Yesudas	P. Bhaskaran	
7	"Pachamalappanamkuruvi"	S. Janaki	P. Bhaskaran	
8	"Panchabaananen Cheviyil"	P. Susheela	P. Bhaskaran	
9	"Thinkalmukhi"	S. Janaki, Chorus	P. Bhaskaran	
10	"Vinuthaasuthane"	P. Jayachandran, Chorus	P. Bhaskaran	
