= Karthika (film) =

- Directed by: M. Krishnan Nair
- Written by: S. L. Puram Sadanandan
- Screenplay by: S. L. Puram Sadanandan
- Produced by: V. M. Sreenivasan; A. R. Divakar
- Starring: Sathyan; Sharada; Adoor Bhasi; Manavalan Joseph
- Edited by: G. Venkittaraman
- Music by: M. S. Baburaj
- Production company: Ambili Films
- Distributed by: Ambili Films
- Release date: 24 May 1968
- Country: India
- Language: Malayalam

Karthika is a 1968 Indian Malayalam film, directed by M. Krishnan Nair and produced by V. M. Sreenivasan and A. R. Divakar. The film stars Sathyan, Sharada, Adoor Bhasi, Ummar and Manavalan Joseph in the lead roles. The film had musical score by M. S. Baburaj.

== Cast ==
- Sarada as Kaarthika
- Sathyan
- K. P. Ummer
- Prem Nawas
- Mallika Sukumaran as Devaki
- Usharani as Janu
- Meena

== Soundtrack ==
The music was composed by M. S. Baburaj and the lyrics were written by Yusufali Kechery.

No.	Song	Singers	Lyrics	Length (m:ss)
1	"Ikkareyaanente"	K. J. Yesudas, P. Susheela	Yusufali Kechery	
2	"Kaarthika Nakshathrathe"	Prem Prakash	Yusufali Kechery	
3	"Kanmaniye" (Pathos)	S. Janaki	Yusufali Kechery	
4	"Kanmaniye Karayaathurangoo" (Happy)	S. Janaki	Yusufali Kechery	
5	"Madhumaasaraathri"	S. Janaki	Yusufali Kechery	
6	"Paavaadapraayathil"	K. J. Yesudas	Yusufali Kechery	
