= Kattukurangu =

1969 film by P. Bhaskaran

- Directed by: P. Bhaskaran
- Written by: K. Surendran
- Produced by: K. Ravindran Nair
- Starring: Sathyan; Sharada; Jayabharathi; Kaviyoor Ponnamma
- Cinematography: E. N. Balakrishnan
- Edited by: K. Narayanan; K. Sankunni
- Music by: G. Devarajan
- Production company: General Pictures
- Release date: 6 February 1969
- Country: India
- Language: Malayalam

Kattukurangu (transl. Forest monkey) is a 1969 Indian Malayalam-language film, directed by P. Bhaskaran and written by K. Surendran. The film stars Sathyan, Sharada, Jayabharathi and Kaviyoor Ponnamma. It was released on 6 February 1969.

== Cast ==
- Sathyan as Prabhakaran
- Sharada as Soudamini (Minikutty)
- Jayabharathi as Ambili
- Kaviyoor Ponnamma as Thulasi
- Adoor Bhasi
- Jose Prakash as Das
- Kottayam Santha
- Pappukutty Bhagavathar
- Pattom Sadan
- P. J. Antony as Vasavan
- Baby Rajani
- Baby Rani
- K. P. Ummer as Chakrapani
- Khadeeja
- Meena as Kamalam
- N. Govindankutty
- Vanchiyoor Radha

== Soundtrack ==
All lyrics are written by P. Bhaskaran except where noted; all music is composed by G. Devarajan.

Track listing
No.	Title	Lyrics	Singer(s)	Length
1.	"Ariyunnilla Bhavaan"		P. Susheela
2.	"Kaarthikaraathriyile"		P. Susheela
3.	"Kallukulangare"		Adoor Bhasi
4.	"Maarodanachu Njaan"		P. Susheela
5.	"Naada Brahmathin Saagaram"		K. J. Yesudas
6.	"Pankajadalanayane"		Kamalam
7.	"Shyaamalam Graamaranga"		Adoor Bhasi
8.	"Utharamadhuraapuri"	Kumaran Asan	Adoor Bhasi
9.	"Vidhyaarthini Njaan"		P. Susheela
