= Kattuthulasi =

- Directed by: M. Krishnan Nair
- Screenplay by: Thoppil Bhasi
- Produced by: M. Kunchacko
- Starring: Sathyan; Ushakumari; Sharada; Adoor Bhasi; Manavalan Joseph
- Music by: M. S. Baburaj
- Production company: Excel Productions
- Release date: 10 July 1965
- Country: India
- Language: Malayalam

Kattuthulasi (transl. Forest basil) is a 1965 Indian Malayalam-language film, directed by M. Krishnan Nair and produced by M. Kunchacko. The film stars Sathyan, Ushakumari, Sharada, Adoor Bhasi and Manavalan Joseph. It was released on 10 July 1965.

== Plot ==
The title serves as a metaphor. Thulasi is the name of the female lead character—an estate laborer working in a mountain tea plantation. Much like a wild basil plant growing naturally and resiliently in the rugged hills or forests rather than a tended garden, the character represents untamed grace, and vulnerability against harsh, powerful forces. Thulasi and the plantation owner's son faal in love with each other. Amid fierce opposition to their romance due to the extreme divide in their social status, a tragic series of events unfolds. Thulasi's resilience is tested as she fights against societal cruelty.

== Cast ==
- Sathyan
- Ushakumari as Thulasi
- Sharada
- Adoor Bhasi
- Manavalan Joseph
- Changanasseri Chinnamma
- Bahadoor
- K. S. Gopinath
- Kottarakkara Sreedharan Nair
- M. S. Namboothiri

== Soundtrack ==
The music was composed by M. S. Baburaj and the lyrics were written by Vayalar Ramavarma.

Song	Singers
"Aaraaro Aaraaro"	Jikki
"Gangayaarozhukunna"	P. Susheela
"Inakkuyile Inakkuyile" [Thulasi Thulasi Vili Kelkoo]	P. B. Sreenivas
"Manchaadikkilimaina"	K. J. Yesudas, Jikki
"Naalumozhikuravayumaay"	Jikki
"Sooryakaanthi"	S. Janaki
"Thinthaare Thinthaare"	L. R. Eeswari, M. S. Baburaj, Chorus, C. O. Anto
"Vellichilanka Aninjum"	K. J. Yesudas
