= Manoradham =

- Directed by: P. Gopikumar
- Written by: Jayasankar pothuvathu
- Screenplay by: Jayasankar pothuvathu
- Produced by: K. H. Khan Sahib
- Starring: P. Bhaskaran; Sharada; Sankaradi; K. P. Ummer
- Cinematography: Anandakuttan
- Edited by: K. Sankunni
- Music by: V. Dakshinamoorthy
- Production company: Kanthi Harsha
- Distributed by: Kanthi Harsha
- Release date: 4 May 1978
- Country: India
- Language: Malayalam

Manoradham is a 1978 Indian Malayalam film, directed by P. Gopikumar and produced by K. H. Khan Sahib. The film stars P. Bhaskaran, Sharada, Sankaradi and K. P. Ummer in the lead roles. The film has musical score by V. Dakshinamoorthy.

== Cast ==
- P. Bhaskaran
- Sharada
- Sankaradi
- K. P. Ummer
- Ravi Menon
- Seema
- Vidhubala

== Soundtrack ==
All lyrics are written by P. Bhaskaran; all music is composed by V. Dakshinamoorthy.

Track listing
No.	Title	Artist(s)	Length
1.	"Chirakaala Kaamitha"	Vani Jairam
2.	"Kazhinja Kaalathin"	K. J. Yesudas, Ambili
3.	"Maanasa Souvarna"	K. J. Yesudas
4.	"Madhura Swarga"	K. J. Yesudas, Vani Jairam
