= Kakkathamburatti =

- Theatrical Poster
- Directed by: P. Bhaskaran
- Written by: Sreekumaran Thampi
- Screenplay by: Sreekumaran Thampi
- Produced by: C. J. Baby; P. C. Ittoop
- Starring: Prem Nazir; Madhu; Sharada; Jayabharathi
- Cinematography: D. V. Rajaram
- Edited by: K. Narayanan
- Music by: K. Raghavan
- Production company: Swapna Pictures
- Distributed by: Swapna Pictures
- Release date: 9 October 1970
- Country: India
- Language: Malayalam

Kakkathamburatti is a 1970 Indian Malayalam film directed by P. Bhaskaran and produced by C. J. Baby and P. C. Ittoop. The film stars Prem Nazir, Madhu, Sharada, and Jayabharathi. The film has a musical score by K. Raghavan.

== Cast ==
- Prem Nazir as Naanu
- Madhu as Rajappan
- Sharada as Janamma
- Jayabharathi as Sarala
- Adoor Bhasi as Kuttappan
- P. J. Antony as Kochupaappu
- Sankaradi as Kittuashan
- Sreelatha Namboothiri as Devayani
- Paul Vengola as Manth Padmanabhan
- Aravindakshan as Shankaran
- Latheef as Velu
- Adoor Bhavani as Kushinikaali
- Bhaskaran Nair as Politician
- G. K. Pillai as Kaduva Vasu
- Khadeeja as Naani
- Kottarakkara Sreedharan Nair as Kunju Panikkan
- Kuttan Pillai as Vaidyar
- Pathrose Kunnamkulam
- Veeran
- Vijayan Pallikkara
- Padmakumar

== Soundtrack ==
The music was composed by K. Raghavan and the lyrics were written by Sreekumaran Thampi and P. Bhaskaran.

No.	Song	Singers	Lyrics	Length (m:ss)
1	"Ambalappuza Vela"	K. J. Yesudas	Sreekumaran Thampi	
2	"Kannuneerin Periyaattil"	K. J. Yesudas	P. Bhaskaran	
3	"Panchavarnnappainkilikal"	K. J. Yesudas, S. Janaki	Sreekumaran Thampi	
4	"Uthrattathiyil"	S. Janaki	P. Bhaskaran	
5	"Vellilakkingini"	P. Jayachandran	Sreekumaran Thampi	
