= Udayam (film) =

- Directed by: P. Bhaskaran
- Written by: Ettumanur Chandrasekharan Nair; Sreekumaran Thampi (dialogues)
- Screenplay by: Sreekumaran Thampi
- Starring: Madhu; Sharada; Adoor Bhasi; Prem Prakash
- Cinematography: S. J. Thomas
- Edited by: K. Sankunni
- Music by: V. Dakshinamoorthy
- Production company: Suchithramanjari
- Distributed by: Suchithramanjari
- Release date: 16 March 1973
- Country: India
- Language: Malayalam

Udayam is a 1973 Indian Malayalam film, directed by P. Bhaskaran. The film stars Madhu, Sharada, Adoor Bhasi and Prem Prakash in the lead roles. The film had musical score by V. Dakshinamoorthy.

== Cast ==
- Madhu as Rajasekharan
- Sharada as Geetha (dubbed by KPAC Lalitha)
- Adoor Bhasi as Ready Krishnapillai
- Prem Prakash as Unni
- Sankaradi as Raman Pillai
- Shobha as Young Geetha
- T. R. Omana as Lakshmikkuttiyamma
- Raghavan as Mohandas/Dasappan
- T. S. Muthaiah as Vasu Pillai
- Adoor Bhavani as Bhavaniyamma
- Amba
- Bahadoor as Ittiyavira
- C. K. Aravindakshan
- K. V. Mathew as Sadanandan
- Master Vijayakumar as Young Rajasekharan
- P. K. Nambiar
- P. O. Thomas as Thomas
- Philomina as Ikkavamma
- Radhamani as Vanaja
- Raghava Menon as Chakkochan
- Ramankutty Menon as Narayana Pillai
- Rani Chandra as Hema
- Thodupuzha Radhakrishnan as Uthuppu
- Vanchiyoor Radha
- Madhuri as Dancer
- Bhaskaran Nair
- Pala Thankam
- T. K. Balachandran

== Soundtrack ==
The music was composed by V. Dakshinamoorthy and the song lyrics were written by P. Bhaskaran and Sreekumaran Thampi.

No.	Song	Singers	Lyrics	Length (m:ss)
1	"Chaale Chaalicha"	S. Janaki	P. Bhaskaran	
2	"En Mandahaasam"	K. J. Yesudas	Sreekumaran Thampi	
3	"Ente Makan Krishnanunni"	S. Janaki	P. Bhaskaran	
4	"Kalayude Devi"	S. Janaki, Ambili	Sreekumaran Thampi	
5	"Karalinte Kadalaassil"	P. Jayachandran	Sreekumaran Thampi	
