= Rathrivandi =

Raathrivandi
- Directed by: Vijayanarayanan
- Written by: N. Govindankutty
- Screenplay by: N. Govindankutty
- Produced by: A. Raghunath
- Starring: Vincent, T. S. Muthaiah, N. Govindankutty, Bahadoor, K. P. Ummer, Kumari Padmini, T. R. Omana, Sadhana
- Cinematography: C. Ramachandra Menon
- Edited by: K. Narayanan; Neelakantan; Vellachami
- Music by: M. S. Baburaj
- Production company: Sanjay Productions
- Distributed by: Manneth Films
- Release date: 16 June 1971
- Country: India
- Language: Malayalam

Raathrivandi is a 1971 Indian Malayalam film, directed by Vijayanarayanan and produced by A. Raghunath. The film stars Vincent, Kumari Padmini, T. R. Omana, Jeasy and T. S. Muthaiah in the lead roles. The film had musical score by M. S. Baburaj.

== Cast ==
- Vincent as Babu
- T. S. Muthaiah as Peter
- N. Govindankutty as Robert
- Bahadoor as Police Constable
- Kunchan
- Veeran
- K. P. Ummer as Willy
- Kumari Padmini
- T. R. Omana as Lakshmiyamma
- Sadhana
- Jayakumari
- Jaraldin
- Vijayashanthi
- Kayyalam
- Justin
- Sukumaran
- Jessi
- Mohan
- Nambiar
- Devassy
- Kuttan Pillai
- Lakshmanan
- Mathew Plathottam
- K. S. Parvathy
- Ramankutty Menon
- Anthikkad Mani
- Abbas (Old)

== Soundtrack ==
The music was composed by M. S. Baburaj.

No.	Song	Singers	Lyrics	Length (m:ss)
1	"Anuvaadamillaathe"	L. R. Eswari	P. Bhaskaran	
2	"Poovukal Chirichu"	K. J. Yesudas, S. Janaki	P. Bhaskaran	
3	"Vaarmazhavillinte"	S. Janaki	P. Bhaskaran	
4	"Vijanatheerame"	K. J. Yesudas	P. Bhaskaran	

Notice of Rathrivandi
