= Veeran =

Indian actor

Veeran (Veera Raghavan Nair)
- Born: Edathuva, Kerala, India
- Occupations: Film actor Dubbing Artiste
- Years active: 1952–1980

Veeran was an Indian actor and dubbing artist in Malayalam cinema. He acted in more than 100 films, appearing in character roles as well as villain roles.

== Filmography ==
- Akalangalil Abhayam (1980)
- Rakthamillatha Manushyan (1979) as Sumathi's father
- Kalliyankattu Neeli (1979)
- Ezhunirangal (1979) as Raghava Panikker
- Bandhanam (1978)
- Avar Jeevikkunnu (1978)
- Rowdy Ramu (1978)
- Adavukal Pathinettu (1978)
- Kaithappoo (1978)
- Makampiranna Manka (1977)
- Kaduvaye Pidicha Kiduva (1977)
- Vishukkani (1977) as Collector Janardhanan Nair
- Anugraham (1977) as Joseph contractor
- Aparaadhi (1977) as Shankara Pillai
- Aayiram Janmangal (1976) as Panikkar
- Manimuzhakkam (1978) as Govinda Menon
- Chalanam (1975)
- Chattambikkalyaani (1975) as Thirumanassu/Gangster
- Prayanam (1975)
- Pulivaalu (1975)
- Kanyakumari (1974) as Somasundaram
- Nadeenadanmaare Aavasyamundu (1974)
- Raakkuyil (1973)
- Veendum Prabhaatham (1973)
- Nakhangal (1973)
- Panitheeratha Veedu (1973) as Kunjikannan
- Kaapaalika (1973) as Ittooppu
- Miss Mary (1972)
- Iniyoru Janmam Tharu (1972)
- Puthrakameshti (1972)
- Sree Guruvayoorappan (1972)
- Thettu (1971) as Kaippassery Paili
- Aabhijathyam (1971) as Barrister Pilla
- Puthanveedu (1971)
- Panchavan Kaadu (1971)
- Moonu Pookkal (1971)
- Muthassi (1971)
- Rathri Vandi (1971) as Aravindan
- Sthree (1970)
- Kaakkathampuraatti (1970)
- Ambalapraavu (1970)
- Priya (1970)
- Abhayam (1970)
- Kallichellamma (1969)
- Newspaper Boy (1955)
- Puthradharmam (1954)
- Baalyasakhi (1954)
- Aathmasakhi (1952)
