= Aparadhini =

Aparaadhini
- Directed by: P. Bhaskaran
- Written by: Mohan; Parappurathu (dialogues)
- Screenplay by: Parappurathu
- Produced by: B. S. Ranga
- Starring: Sathyan; Sharada; Ambika; Padmini
- Cinematography: B. N. Haridas
- Edited by: Chakrapani; PC Mohanan
- Music by: M. B. Sreenivasan
- Production company: Vasanth Pictures
- Distributed by: Vasanth Pictures
- Release date: 7 November 1968
- Country: India
- Language: Malayalam

Aparaadhini is a 1968 Indian Malayalam-language film, directed by P. Bhaskaran and produced by B. S. Ranga. The film stars Sathyan, Sharada, Ambika and Padmini. The film had musical score by M. B. Sreenivasan.

== Cast ==
- Sathyan
- Sharada
- Ambika
- Padmini
- Sukumari
- Adoor Bhasi
- Thikkurissy Sukumaran Nair
- Shobha
- Bahadoor
- C. A. Balan

== Soundtrack ==
The music was composed by M. B. Sreenivasan.

No.	Song	Singers	Lyrics	Length (m:ss)
1	"Devayaani"	P. Susheela, P. B. Sreenivas	P. Bhaskaran	
2	"Jeevithathile Naadakamo"	K. J. Yesudas	P. Bhaskaran	
3	"Kottiyadachoren"	K. J. Yesudas, S. Janaki	P. Bhaskaran	
4	"Raajahamsame"	S. Janaki	P. Bhaskaran	
5	"Vivaaha Mandapathil"	P. Susheela	P. Bhaskaran	
