= Kalyana Sougandhikam (1975 film) =

Kalyaana Sougandhikam
- Directed by: P. Vijayan
- Starring: Jayabharathi; Adoor Bhasi; Thikkurissy Sukumaran Nair; Sreelatha Namboothiri
- Music by: Pukazhenthi
- Production company: VAV Pictures
- Distributed by: VAV Pictures
- Release date: 9 May 1975
- Country: India
- Language: Malayalam

Kalyaana Sougandhikam is a 1975 Indian Malayalam-language film, directed by P. Vijayan. The film stars Jayabharathi, Adoor Bhasi, Thikkurissy Sukumaran Nair and Sreelatha Namboothiri. The film has musical score by Pukazhenthi.

== Cast ==
- Jayabharathi
- Adoor Bhasi
- Thikkurissy Sukumaran Nair
- Sreelatha Namboothiri
- Paravoor Bharathan
- Vincent
- Saleema

== Soundtrack ==
The music was composed by Pukazhenthi.

No.	Song	Singers	Lyrics	Length (m:ss)
1	"Chandana Mukilin"	S. Janaki, S. T. Sasidharan	P. Bhaskaran	
2	"Gaanamadhu Veendum"	L. R. Eswari, Ayiroor Sadasivan	P. Bhaskaran	
3	"Kalyaanasougandhikappoovallayo"	K. J. Yesudas	Mankombu Gopalakrishnan	
4	"Neeraattu Kadavile"	P. Jayachandran	P. Bhaskaran	
