= Karutha Pournami =

- Directed by: Narayanankutty Vallath
- Written by: C. P. Antony
- Screenplay by: C. P. Antony
- Produced by: N. G. Menon
- Starring: Madhu; Sharada; P. J. Antony; Bahadoor
- Cinematography: T. N. Krishnankutty Nair
- Edited by: T. R. Sreenivasalu
- Music by: M. K. Arjunan
- Production company: Bernard Shaw Pictures
- Release date: 29 March 1968
- Country: India
- Language: Malayalam

Karutha Pournami is a 1968 Indian Malayalam film, directed by Narayanankutty Vallath and produced by N. G. Menon. The film stars Madhu, Sharada, P. J. Antony and Bahadoor in the lead roles. Officially released on 29 March 1968, it is notable as one of the earlier musical compositions in the career of M. K. Arjunan.

== Cast ==
- Madhu
- Sharada
- P. J. Antony
- Bahadoor
- Jayanthi
- S. P. Pillai
- Vijayanirmala
- Xavier
- Baby Gracy
- Johnson

== Soundtrack ==
The music was composed by M. K. Arjunan and the lyrics were written by P. Bhaskaran.

No.	Song	Singers	Lyrics	Length (m:ss)
1	"Hridayamuruki Nee"	K. J. Yesudas	P. Bhaskaran	
2	"Kavithayil Mungi"	S. Janaki	P. Bhaskaran	
3	"Maanathin Muttathu"	K. J. Yesudas	P. Bhaskaran	
4	"Maanathin Muttathu" (F)	S. Janaki	P. Bhaskaran	
5	"Ponkinaavin"	K. J. Yesudas	P. Bhaskaran	
6	"Ponnilanji"	B. Vasantha	P. Bhaskaran	
7	"Shishuvineppol Punchirithooki"	K. J. Yesudas, S. Janaki	P. Bhaskaran	
