= Vilakkum Velichavum =

- Poster
- Directed by: P. Bhaskaran
- Screenplay by: Thoppil Bhasi
- Produced by: Pavamani
- Starring: P. Bhaskaran; Prem Nazir; Sheela; Adoor Bhasi
- Cinematography: Vipin Das
- Edited by: G. Venkittaraman
- Music by: G. Devarajan
- Production company: Prathap Chithra
- Distributed by: Prathap Chithra
- Release date: 17 August 1978
- Country: India
- Language: Malayalam

Vilakkum Velichavum is a 1978 Indian Malayalam film, directed by P. Bhaskaran and produced by Pavamani. The film stars P. Bhaskaran, Prem Nazir, Sheela and Adoor Bhasi in the lead roles. The film has musical score by G. Devarajan.

== Cast ==
- P. Bhaskaran
- Prem Nazir
- Sheela
- Adoor Bhasi
- Sreelatha Namboothiri
- T. R. Omana
- Bahadoor
- K. P. Ummer
- Seema

== Soundtrack ==
The music was composed by G. Devarajan and the lyrics were written by P. Bhaskaran.

No.	Song	Singers	Lyrics	Length (m:ss)
1	"Dukhamaanu Saaswatha"	K. J. Yesudas	P. Bhaskaran	
2	"Pandu Pandoru"	P. Madhuri	P. Bhaskaran	
3	"Vaadiya Maruvil"	K. J. Yesudas	P. Bhaskaran	
4	"Velicham Vilakkine"	K. J. Yesudas	P. Bhaskaran	
