= Pareeksha (1967 film) =

- Directed by: P. Bhaskaran
- Written by: T. N. Gopinathan Nair
- Based on: Pareeksha by T. N. Gopinathan Nair
- Produced by: N. Vasu Menon
- Starring: Prem Nazir; Sharada; Adoor Bhasi; Thikkurissy Sukumaran Nair
- Cinematography: E. N. Balakrishnan
- Edited by: K. Narayanan; K. Sankunni
- Music by: M. S. Baburaj
- Production company: Rani Films
- Release date: 19 October 1967
- Country: India
- Language: Malayalam

Pareeksha (transl. “Examination”) is a 1967 Indian Malayalam-language film directed by P. Bhaskaran and written by T. N. Gopinathan Nair. It is based on Nair's 1964 play of the same name. The film stars Prem Nazir, Sharada, Adoor Bhasi and Thikkurissy Sukumaran Nair. The story details corruption and malpractice in the education system and conduct of public examinations.

Shot at Vasu Studio, the film had a highly successful musical composition by M. S. Baburaj. Pareeksha released on 19 October 1967 and was a huge commercial success at the box office.

== Plot ==
Neelakanta Pillai lives in a village with his son Appu and daughter Parvathi. Appu fails in the SSLC examinations. Pillai's sister Lakshmi Amma also lives in the same village. Her son Vijayan, who works in Calcutta, gets transferred to Ernakulam. Vijayan takes Appu with him to coach the boy for the SSLC exams the following year.

Vijayan and Appu stay in a small house in Headmaster Janardhanan Pillai's compound. The headmaster is a friend of Neelakanta Pillai. Vijayan falls in love with Janardanan Pillai's daughter Yamuna, and their families decide to get them married.

The SSLC examinations are over. Appu is doubtful of clearing his science exam. Janardanan Pillai is the evaluator of his paper. Neelakanta Pillai approaches Janardanan Pillai to know his son's result in advance. Appu fails to secure the 35 marks need to pass the exam, managing to get only 26 marks. A respected and honest teacher, Janardanan Pillai refuses to give Appu extra marks.

Vijayan is indebted to his uncle Neelakantan Pillai. He assures him that he will influence Janardanan Pillai and that Appu will get through the examinations. But the headmaster rejects Vijayan's request to manipulate the mark list. Vijayan forces Yamuna to get things done in his favour. Yamuna corrects the original marks. She changes 26 to 62 in the examination paper as well as the mark list.

Janardanan Pillai learns of his daughter's actions. He is shocked to learn from his wife Bhageerathi that Yamuna is pregnant and that Vijayan may refuse to marry her if Appu fails to clear the exams.

When Neelakantan Pillai learns of all this, he decides to meet Janardanan Pillai with Vijayan and Appu to apologise. But they arrive to learn that Janardanan Pillai has died—after correcting the marks to the original 26.

== Cast ==
- Prem Nazir as Vijayan
- Sharada as Yamuna
- Adoor Bhasi as Ayyappan Pilla
- Thikkurissy Sukumaran Nair as Janardhanan Pilla
- Kottayam Santha
- P. J. Antony as Neelakanta Pillai
- T. R. Omana as Bhagirathi
- B. K. Pottekkad
- Latheef as Appu
- Aranmula Ponnamma
- C. A. Balan
- Khadeeja
- Kuttan Pillai
- Panjabi
- Santo Krishnan
- Ramesh
- P. Bhaskaran

== Soundtrack ==
The music was composed by M. S. Baburaj, with lyrics by P. Bhaskaran. The songs were composed in Hindustani ragas. Assisted by R. K. Shekhar, the background score was arranged by M. B. Sreenivasan. Songs like "Oru Pushpam Mathramen" (Desh), "Pranasakhi Njaan Verumoru" (Sindhu Bhairavi), "Avidunnen Ganam Kelkaan" (Pahadi), "En Prana Nayakane" (Yamuna Kalyani) and a romantic number, "Annu Ninte Nunakuzhi", were highly popular and sometimes regarded by critics as among the best songs in the language.

Track listing
No.	Title	Singer(s)	Length
1.	"Annu Ninte Nunakkuzhi"	K. J. Yesudas
2.	"Avidunnen Gaanam Kelkkaan"	S. Janaki
3.	"Chelil Thaamara" (Bit)	S. Janaki
4.	"En Praananaayakane"	S. Janaki
5.	"Oru Pushpam Mathramen"	K. J. Yesudas
6.	"Praanasakhi Njan Verumoru"	K. J. Yesudas
