= Thulabharam =

- Poster
- Directed by: A. Vincent
- Written by: Thoppil Bhasi
- Produced by: Hari Pothen – Supriya
- Starring: Prem Nazir; Sharada; Madhu; Sheela; Thikkurisi Sukumaran Nair; Adoor Bhasi
- Cinematography: P. Bhaskara Rao
- Edited by: G. Venkittraman
- Music by: G. Devarajan
- Production company: Supriya
- Release date: 30 August 1968
- Country: India
- Language: Malayalam

Thulabharam (transl. Weighing scale) is a 1968 Indian Malayalam-language film, directed by A. Vincent. It is based on the Kerala People's Arts Club play of the same name, written by Thoppil Bhasi. Thoppil Bhasi also adapted the play for the screen. The film had an ensemble cast including Prem Nazir, Sharada, Madhu, Sheela, Thikkurisi Sukumaran Nair and Adoor Bhasi. The film won two National Awards. The film was a major blockbuster and following the Malayalam version, the film was made in Tamil (Thulabharam), Telugu (Manushulu Marali) and Hindi (Samaj Ko Badal Dalo), with Sharada playing lead roles in all versions.

== Plot ==
Vijaya and Vatsala were two close friends who parted ways after Vatsala's father, a lawyer, lost a case of Vijaya's father and it resulted in the latter's death. Vijaya is married off to Ramu, a trade union leader, against her will. Ramu leads a union strike and is killed when the agitation turns violent. Vijaya's life becomes miserable and she kills her starving children, but is arrested before she could commit suicide. In the end, she is given the death penalty by the prosecution, led by her former dear friend Vatsala, who had become a famous lawyer in the meantime.

== Cast ==
- Prem Nazir as Ramu
- Sharada as Vijaya
- Madhu as Babu
- Sheela as Valsala
- Adoor Bhasi as Achuthan Nair
- Thikkurissy Sukumaran Nair as R. K. Menon
- Adoor Bhavani
- Baby Ranjani
- Kaduvakulam Antony
- N. Govindankutty
- Nellikode Bhaskaran
- Thoppil Krishna Pillai
- KPAC Khan

== Production ==
Thulabharam is an adaptation of the Kerala People's Arts Club play of the same name, written by Thoppil Bhasi.

== Soundtrack ==
The music was composed by G. Devarajan and the lyrics were written by Vayalar Ramavarma.

No.	Song	Singers	Lyrics	Length (m:ss)
1	"Bhoomidevi Pushpiniyaayi"	P. Susheela, B. Vasantha	Vayalar Ramavarma	
2	"Katadichu"	K. J. Yesudas	Vayalar Ramavarma	3:45
3	"Nashtappeduvaan"	P. Jayachandran, Chorus	Vayalar Ramavarma	
4	"Omanathinkalinnonam"	K. J. Yesudas, P. Susheela	Vayalar Ramavarma	
5	"Omanathinkalinnonam" (Pathos)	P. Susheela	Vayalar Ramavarma	
6	"Prabhaatha Gopura"	K. J. Yesudas, S. Janaki	Vayalar Ramavarma	
7	"Thottu Thottilla"	K. J. Yesudas	Vayalar Ramavarma	

== Remakes ==
The film's success prompted for three remakes with Sharada playing the same role in all versions. The Tamil film with the same name was made by Vincent himself with A. V. M. Rajan replacing Nazir. V. Madhusudhana Rao directed the Telugu and Hindi versions.

== Awards ==
The film won two awards at the 16th National Film Awards.

- National Film Award for Second Best Feature Film
- National Film Award for Best Actress – Sharada

Filmfare Awards South

- Filmfare Award for Best Film - Malayalam won by Supriya Pictures (1968)
