= Chumaduthangi =

1975 film

- Directed by: P. Bhaskaran
- Written by: Sreekumaran Thampi
- Starring: Prem Nazir; Sukumari; Jayabharathi; Kaviyoor Ponnamma
- Cinematography: S. J. Thomas
- Edited by: Chakrapani
- Music by: V. Dakshinamoorthy
- Production company: Sreekanth Films
- Distributed by: Sreekanth Films
- Release date: 14 March 1975
- Country: India
- Language: Malayalam

Chumaduthangi is a 1975 Indian Malayalam-language film directed by P. Bhaskaran. The film stars Prem Nazir, Sukumari, Jayabharathi and Kaviyoor Ponnamma in the lead roles. The film has musical score by V. Dakshinamoorthy.

== Cast ==
- Prem Nazir as Narendran
- Sukumari as Parvathy Menon
- Jayabharathi as Indu
- Kaviyoor Ponnamma as Lakshmi
- Adoor Bhasi
- Jose Prakash as RK Menon
- Prathapachandran as Doctor
- Sukumaran as Reghu
- Bhargavan
- C. A. Balan
- C. R. Lakshmi
- Kunchan as Prabhu
- Pallikkara Aravindakshan
- Raghava Menon
- Simhalan
- Sujatha as Mini
- Suresh as Pradeep
- Usharani as Suganthi
- V. Govindankutty
- Vanchiyoor Radha as Parvathy's friend

== Soundtrack ==
The music was composed by V. Dakshinamoorthy and the lyrics were written by P. Bhaskaran.

No.	Song	Singers	Lyrics	Length (m:ss)
1	"Ethusheethalachaaya Thalangalil"	K. J. Yesudas, S. Janaki	P. Bhaskaran	
2	"Maanathoru Kaavadiyaattam"	S. Janaki	P. Bhaskaran	
3	"Maayalle"	Ambili	P. Bhaskaran	
4	"Swapnangal Alankarikkum"	Jayashree	P. Bhaskaran	
5	"Swapnangal Alankarikkum" (Pathos)	Jayashree	P. Bhaskaran	
6	"Swapnangal Thakarnnittum"	V. Dakshinamoorthy	P. Bhaskaran	
