= Rowdy Ramu =

- Directed by: M. Krishnan Nair
- Written by: Sunitha; Cheri Viswanath (dialogues)
- Screenplay by: Cheri Viswanath
- Produced by: M. Mani
- Starring: Madhu; Sharada; Jayabharathi; Jose Prakash
- Edited by: G. Venkittaraman
- Music by: Shyam; Lyrics: Bichu Thirumala
- Production company: Sunitha Productions
- Distributed by: Sunitha Productions
- Release date: 17 February 1978
- Country: India
- Language: Malayalam

Rowdy Ramu is a 1978 Indian Malayalam film, directed by M. Krishnan Nair and produced by M. Mani. The film stars Madhu, Sharada, Jayabharathi and Jose Prakash in the lead roles and features music composed by Shyam.

== Cast ==
- Madhu as Ramu
- Sharada as Shanthi
- Jayabharathi as Vasanthy
- Jose Prakash as Panchayat president Raghavan Nair
- Manavalan Joseph as Sekhara Pilla
- Raghavan as Vaasu
- Adoor Bhavani as Vaasu's mother
- Anandavally as Devaki
- Aranmula Ponnamma as Lakshmykuttyamma
- Aryad Gopalakrishnan as Chathan
- Baby Sreekala as Sumathi
- Balan K. Nair as Pattalam Bhasi
- KPAC Sunny as Dasappan
- Poojappura Ravi as Mani Swami
- Sadhana as Thankamma
- Veeran as Ramu's father
- Ramu
- Sukumaran Nair
- Hassan
- Soman
- Vasantha
- Girija
- Sarojini

== Soundtrack ==
All lyrics are written by Bichu Thirumala; all music is composed by Shyam.

Track listing
No.	Title	Artist(s)	Length
1.	"Gaaname Prema Gaaname"	K. J. Yesudas, Vani Jairam
2.	"Manjin Thereri"	S. Janaki, Vani Jairam
3.	"Naladamayanthi Kadhayile"	K. J. Yesudas
4.	"Neram Poy"	K. J. Yesudas, Choir
