= Moonnupookkal =

- Directed by: P. Bhaskaran
- Written by: S. L. Puram Sadanandan
- Screenplay by: S. L. Puram Sadanandan
- Starring: Prem Nazir; Sathyan; Madhu; Sheela
- Cinematography: J. G. Vijayam
- Edited by: Chakrapani
- Music by: Pukazhenthi
- Production company: Sreekanth Productions
- Distributed by: Sreekanth Productions
- Release date: 8 January 1971
- Country: India
- Language: Malayalam

Moonnupookkal (transl. Three Flowers) is a 1971 Indian Malayalam film, directed by P. Bhaskaran. The film stars Prem Nazir, Sathyan, Madhu and Sheela in the lead roles. The film had musical score by Pukazhenthi.

== Cast ==
- Prem Nazir
- Sathyan
- Madhu
- Sheela
- Jayabharathi
- Sankaradi
- Sreelatha Namboothiri
- Ambika
- Chandrakala
- Veeran
- Vincent

== Soundtrack ==
The music was composed by Pukazhenthi and the lyrics were written by P. Bhaskaran.

No.	Song	Singers	Lyrics	Length (m:ss)
1	"Kanmunayaale Cheettukal"	K. J. Yesudas	P. Bhaskaran	
2	"Onnaanaam Poomarathil"	S. Janaki	P. Bhaskaran	
3	"Sakhee Kunkumamo"	K. J. Yesudas, S. Janaki	P. Bhaskaran	
4	"Thiriyo Thiri Poothiri"	S. Janaki	P. Bhaskaran	
5	"Vinnilirunnurangunna"	P. Jayachandran	P. Bhaskaran	
