= Vishukkani =

- Poster
- Directed by: J. Sasikumar
- Screenplay by: Sreekumaran Thampi
- Story by: K. S. Gopalakrishnan
- Based on: Karpagam by K. S. Gopalakrishnan
- Produced by: R. M. Sundaram
- Starring: Prem Nazir; Sharada; Vidhubala; Thikkurissy Sukumaran Nair; Sankaradi
- Cinematography: J. Williams
- Edited by: Babu Rao
- Music by: Salil Chowdhury
- Production company: RMS Productions
- Release date: 14 April 1977
- Country: India
- Language: Malayalam

Vishukkani is a 1977 Indian Malayalam-language film, directed by J. Sasikumar and produced by R. M. Sundaram. The film stars Prem Nazir, Sharada, Thikkurissy Sukumaran Nair and Sankaradi. It is a remake of the Tamil film Karpagam.

== Plot Summary ==
Rajendra Panikkar, a prosperous rural farmer (played by Thikkurissy Sukumaran Nair), lives in the village with his daughter Radhika (Vidhubala) and son Radhakrishnan (M. G. Soman). Gopi (Prem Nazir), a capable young farmer, marries Radhika and, at Panikkar’s request, takes charge of the household and the farm. Radhakrishnan marries Jaya (Sreelatha Namboothiri), whose father Prabhakaran Pillai (Sankaradi) is a scheming city man eager to claim Panikkar’s wealth. Jaya gives birth to a daughter, Ambili, but neglects her. Radhika—though childless—deeply cares for the baby, and Ambili grows to consider Radhika and Gopi as her real parents. Jealous and influenced by his father-in-law, Radhakrishnan demands his share and leaves home with Jaya and Ambili. Radhika, heartbroken, falls into depression. Eventually, Ambili is returned to Panikkar’s household.

In a tragic turn, Radhika dies while trying to protect Ambili from a bull. Grieving and wanting Ambili to be cared for, Panikkar insists Gopi remarry. Gopi weds Rajani (Sharada), daughter of a retired District Collector and Radhika’s friend. Initially distant, Rajani gradually bonds with Ambili. Gopi, however, remains emotionally distant. Meanwhile, Radhakrishnan and Prabhakaran Pillai scheme to defraud Panikkar—but their attempt fails. On top of that, Prabhakaran Pillai hires goons to harm Gopi.

• One night at the fields, Ambili—escaping into danger—witnesses the attack on Gopi. Rajani arrives just in time, rescues both Gopi and Ambili from a burning structure, and even takes a fatal knife wound herself. As the police arrive, the villains are arrested. At the hospital, Ambili calls Rajani “Mother,” waking Rajani from her coma. A remorseful Radhakrishnan and Jaya reconcile with the family, and the film concludes with a touching reunion.

== Cast ==
- Prem Nazir as Gopi
- Sharada as Rajani
- Vidhubala as Radhika
- Thikkurissy Sukumaran Nair as Rajendra Panikkar
- Adoor Bhasi as Kurup
- Sankaradi as Prabhakaran Pillai
- M. G. Soman as Radhakrishnan
- Sreelatha Namboothiri as Jaya
- Veeran as Collector Janardhanan Nair
- Reena as Geetha
- Kaduvakulam Antony
- Master Kumar as Ambili

== Soundtrack ==
The music was composed by Salil Chowdhury and the lyrics were written by Sreekumaran Thampi.

Song	Singers
"Kannil Poovu"	Vani Jairam
"Malarkodi Pole"	K. J. Yesudas
"Malarkodi Pole"	S. Janaki
"Munnottu Munnottu"	K. J. Yesudas, Chorus
"Ponnushassin"	P. Jayachandran
"Poovili Poovili"	K. J. Yesudas, Chorus
"Raappadi Paadunna"	P. Susheela
