= Muthassi (film) =

- Directed by: P. Bhaskaran
- Written by: Indu; S. L. Puram Sadanandan (dialogues)
- Screenplay by: S. L. Puram Sadanandan
- Produced by: Sargam Pictures
- Starring: Prem Nazir; Sheela; Jose Prakash; Alummoodan
- Cinematography: C Ramachandra Menon
- Edited by: K. Narayanan
- Music by: V. Dakshinamoorthy
- Production company: Sargam Pictures (P) Ltd.
- Distributed by: Sargam Pictures (P) Ltd.
- Release date: 28 May 1971
- Country: India
- Language: Malayalam

Muthassi is a 1971 Indian Malayalam film, directed by P. Bhaskaran and produced by Sargam Pictures. The film stars Prem Nazir, Sheela, Jose Prakash and Alummoodan in the lead roles. The film had musical score by V. Dakshinamoorthy.

== Cast ==
- Prem Nazir as Venu
- Sheela as Mary/Geetha
- Jose Prakash as Unnikrishnan
- Alummoodan as Menon
- Aranmula Ponnamma as Muthassi
- Baby Rajani as Baiju
- Baby Rani as Babu
- Baby Sumathi as Rekha
- Bahadoor as Raghavan
- K. P. Ummer as Vikraman
- Meena as Meenakshi
- Philomina as Madhavi
- Veeran as Swami
- Ragini as Mary

== Soundtrack ==
The music was composed by V. Dakshinamoorthy and the lyrics were written by P. Bhaskaran.

No.	Song	Singers	Length (m:ss)
1	"Harshabaashpam Thooki"	P. Jayachandran	
2	"Meeshakkaaran Keshavanu"	L. R. Anjali, Kousalya, Aruna	
3	"Mullakalinnale"	K. J. Yesudas	
4	"Pambayaarin Panineer Kadavil"	S. Janaki	
5	"Premakaumudi"	K. J. Yesudas, S. Janaki	
