= Raakuyil =

1973 film by P. Bhaskaran

- Poster
- Directed by: P. Vijayan
- Written by: P. Bhaskaran
- Screenplay by: P. Bhaskaran
- Produced by: P. Bhaskaran
- Starring: Sudheer; Sujatha; Adoor Bhasi; Jose Prakash; Sankaradi; Adoor Pankajam
- Cinematography: Lekshman Gore
- Edited by: K. Sankunni
- Music by: Pukazhenthi
- Production company: Suchithramanjari
- Distributed by: Suchithramanjari
- Release date: 1 June 1973
- Country: India
- Language: Malayalam

Raakuyil is a 1973 Indian Malayalam film, directed by P. Vijayan and produced by P. Bhaskaran. The film stars Adoor Bhasi, Jose Prakash, Sankaradi and Adoor Pankajam in the lead roles. The film had musical score by Pukazhenthi.

== Cast ==
- Adoor Bhasi
- Jose Prakash
- Sankaradi
- Adoor Pankajam
- Bahadoor
- Chandraji
- Paravoor Bharathan
- Philomina
- Sudheer
- Sujatha
- T. K. Balachandran
- Veeran

== Soundtrack ==
The music was composed by Pukazhenthi and the lyrics were written by P. Bhaskaran.

No.	Song	Singers	Lyrics	Length (m:ss)
1	"Innathe Mohana"	S. Janaki	P. Bhaskaran	
2	"Oro Hridayaspandana"	K. J. Yesudas	P. Bhaskaran	
3	"Shyaamasundari"	S. Janaki	P. Bhaskaran	
4	"Vaaruni Penninu Mukham Karuthu"	K. J. Yesudas	P. Bhaskaran	
