= Prapancham =

- Directed by: Sudin Menon
- Written by: Sudin Menon
- Screenplay by: Sudin Menon
- Produced by: Sudin Menon
- Starring: Sudev; Sunitha; Ramu; KNP Nambiar; Sumesh
- Cinematography: C Vasudevan Nair
- Edited by: Devadas
- Music by: Dulalsen
- Release date: 22 October 1971
- Country: India
- Language: Malayalam

Prapancham is a 1971 Indian Malayalam-language film, directed and produced by Sudin Menon. The film stars Sudev, Sunitha, Ramu and K. N. P. Nambiar. The film's score was composed by Dulalsen.

== Cast ==
- Sudev as Rajan
- Sunitha as Thankamma
- Ramu as Kittu Aashaan
- K. N. P. Nambiar as Appan Thamburan
- T. K. Janardhanan as Gopalan Mason
- Kalathur G. K. as Shankaran
- C. R. Lakshmi as Narayani Amma
- Sumesh as Unni

== Soundtrack ==
The music was composed by Dulalsen with lyrics by P. Bhaskaran.

No.	Song	Singers	Lyrics	Length (m:ss)
1	"Indulekha Innuraathriyil"	P. Jayachandran	P. Bhaskaran	
2	"Kanninakal Neeraninjathenthino"	K. J. Yesudas	P. Bhaskaran	
3	"Mottu Virinjilla"	K. J. Yesudas	P. Bhaskaran	
4	"Nee Kanduvo Manohari"	L. R. Eeswari	P. Bhaskaran	
5	"Poyvaroo Thozhi"	L. R. Eeswari	P. Bhaskaran	
