= Aabhijathyam =

- Poster
- Directed by: A. Vincent
- Screenplay by: Thoppil Bhasi
- Produced by: R. S. Prabhu
- Starring: Madhu; Sharada; Sukumari; Kaviyoor Ponnamma
- Cinematography: A. Venkat
- Edited by: G. Venkitaraman
- Music by: A. T. Ummer
- Production company: Rajesh Films
- Release date: 12 August 1971
- Country: India
- Language: Malayalam

Aabhijathyam (transl. False pride) is a 1971 Indian Malayalam-language drama film directed by A. Vincent and produced by R. S. Prabhu. A remake of the Marathi film Manini (1961), it stars Madhu, Sharada, Sukumari and Kaviyoor Ponnamma. It was released on 12 August 1971. It was remade in Tamil as Petha Manam Pithu and in Telugu as Abhimanthavalu.

== Plot ==
Malathi, born into a wealthy family, defies her father's wishes by marrying her music teacher, who is of modest means. Family insults at her sister's wedding drive Malathi and her husband to leave before the celebrations begin. Their departure deeply affects her mother, who becomes bedridden and passes away from sorrow. Realizing his errors, Malathi's father seeks forgiveness, reconciles with her, and chooses to live with her permanently.

== Cast ==
- Madhu as Madhavan
- Sharada as Malathi (voice dubbed by K. P. A. C. Lalitha)
- Sukumari
- Kaviyoor Ponnamma as Malathi's mother
- Adoor Bhasi
- Thikkurissy Sukumaran Nair as Malathi's father
- Sankaradi
- Raghavan
- Baby Jayarani
- Junior Sheela
- Kannoor Rajam
- Kedamangalam Ali
- Master Bablu
- Master Babu
- Master Sekhar
- Metilda
- Pala Thankam
- Philomina
- Ramankutty
- S. P. Pillai
- Sathyapalan Nair
- Thodupuzha Radhakrishnan
- Veeran
- Vijayabhanu
- Krishnankutty

== Soundtrack ==
All lyrics are written by P. Bhaskaran; all music is composed by A. T. Ummer.

No.	Title	Artist(s)	Length
1.	"Aattin Manappuratharayaalin"	Ambili, Latha Raju
2.	"Chempakappoonkaavanathile"	K. J. Yesudas
3.	"Kalyaanakkuruvikku"	P. Leela, Choir
4.	"Mazhamukiloli Varnnan"	S. Janaki
5.	"Raasaleelaykku"	K. J. Yesudas, B. Vasantha
6.	"Thallu Thallu"	Ambili, Adoor Bhasi, Latha Raju
7.	"Vrischika Raathri Than"	K. J. Yesudas, P. Susheela

== Accolades ==
- Filmfare Award for Best Film – Malayalam
