= Pukazhenthi =

Indian composer

Background information
- Born: T. K. Velappan Nair; 27 September 1929; Thiruvananthapuram, Kerala, India
- Died: 27 February 2005 (aged 75) Thiruvananthapuram, Kerala, India
- Genres: Film score, theatre
- Occupations: Composer, music director
- Years active: 1955–2005

T. K. Velappan Nair (27 September 1929 – February 27, 2005), popularly known as Pukazhenthi (also credited as Puhalendi), was an Indian music director of Malayalam, Tamil and Telugu films.

== Biography ==
Pukazhenthi was born on 27 September 1929, in Thiruvananthapuram, to Keshapillai and Janaki Amma. He did his schooling at V. M. School, Chala. He used the name of Tamil poet Pukazhenthi as an alias when he began his career as a music director, first appearing on the Tamil play Thozhan. Pukezhenthi worked as Mahadevan's associate in 250 films in Tamil, Telugu and Malayalam. He debuted in Malayalam with Muthalali (1965). He is known as "Puhalendi" in Telugu film industry. Mahadevan-Puhalendi as music director duo scored music for N. T. Rama Rao 1993 film Srinatha Kavi Sarvabhowmudu. His last work came in 1995. He died aged 75 in a hotel room in Thiruvananthapuram on 27 February 2005 after a cardiac arrest.

== Filmography ==
Malayalam

- Muthalali (1965)
- Bhagyamudra (1967)
- Vilakuranja Manushyar (1969)
- Kochaniyathi (1971)
- Moonu Pookkal (1971)
- Vithukal (1971)
- Sneehadeepame Mizhi Thurakku (1972)
- Rakkuyil (1973)
- Kalyana Sougandhikam (1975)
- Agniparvatham (1979)
- Arayannam (1981)
- Panchagni (1986)
- Hima Nandini (1995)

Tamil

- Selviyin Selvan (1968)
- Gurudakshinai (1969)
