= Sarada (actress) =

Indian actress

- Born: Saraswati Devi; 12 June 1945 (age 81); Tenali, Madras Presidency, British India (now Andhra Pradesh, India)
- Other name: Urvasi Sarada
- Occupation: Actress
- Years active: 1955; 1961–present
- Political party: Telugu Desam Party
- Spouse: Chalam (m. 1972; div. 1984)
- Awards: National Film Award for Best Actress (3)

Member of Parliament, Lok Sabha
- In office 1996–1998
- Preceded by: Ummareddy Venkateswarlu
- Succeeded by: P. Shiv Shankar
- Constituency: Tenali

Thadiparthi Saraswati Devi (born 12 June 1945), better known by her stage name Sarada, is an Indian actress and politician. Though known for her work predominantly in Telugu and Malayalam cinema, she has also appeared in Tamil, Hindi and Kannada language films.

Sarada is a three-time recipient of the National Film Award for Best Actress for her roles in Thulabharam (1968), Swayamvaram (1972), and Nimajjanam (1977). She is also known as Urvasi Sarada – the National Film Award for Best Actress was officially designated the Urvasi Award. Sarada also won the NTR National Award by the Government of Andhra Pradesh for her contributions to Indian cinema. In 2024, she was honoured with the J. C. Daniel Award by the Government of Kerala, for her contributions to Malayalam cinema.

== Early life ==
Sarada was born on 12 June 1945 as Saraswati Devi in Tenali, Madras Presidency, British India (in present-day Guntur, Andhra Pradesh, India). Her parents Venkateswar Rao and Satyavathi Devi were farmers. She has a brother, Mohan Rao. Sarada was sent to Madras in her childhood to live with her grandmother Kanakamma. Sarada describes her grandmother as a "strict disciplinarian" who in the later days "wouldn't even let the heroes touch her" and allowed "rehearsals only on Sundays". Sarada started to learn dance when she was six. She used to perform during Dasara and other temple festivals. Because of her mother's desire, she learnt dancing. Her mother wanted her to be a "big star in cine field". Though Sarada's father was not too interested in the idea, he did not stop her.

Sarada married Telugu actor Chalam, and the couple later divorced. Currently, Sarada resides with her brother's family in Chennai.

== Early career ==
When she grew up, she started acting in Telugu theatre. Her debut in cinema was with a minor role in the Telugu film Kanyasulkam. However, she returned to theatre after that and did a major role in the Telugu version of Ratha Kanneer, a Tamil drama. The play went on to be staged over 100 times in Tamil Nadu.

=== Film career ===
In 1959, she began her career as Sarada. The change in name was attributed to the presence of a few other actors in the industry with the name Saraswati, after a Hindu goddess. She came under contract to L.V. Prasad, a Telugu producer. Though she didn't get to act in any of his films, she got her formal training in acting under him, including the Navarasa lessons. She largely attributes her performances and growth in the field to this training. Her first break came with the Akkineni Nageswara Rao-starrer Iddaru Mitrulu, which was a major hit. Noted for the role in the film, she got acting offers from Tamil and Malayalam films as well.

The year 1965 changed her career as Sarada carved her niche for herself in the Malayalam film industry with her performances in Shakuntala, Murappennu, Udhyogastha by P. Venu, Kattu Thulasi and Inapravukal. After that, she focused in Malayalam films, acting only a few roles in other languages. Recognition came in 1967 in the form of a national honorary award for her performances in various films of 1966 including Iruttinte Athmavu. The award was the predecessor to the National Film Award for Best Actress, which was instituted in 1968. In 1969, she won her first National Film Award for Best Actress for her performance in Thulabharam. She went on to win the award 2 more times, for Swayamvaram (1972, Malayalam) and Nimajjanam (1978, Telugu). She also won the Kerala State Film Awards for Best Actress one time. After 1993, she became choosy and accepted only a few films. Her major films of late were Mazhathullikkilukkam (2002, Malayalam), Rappakal (2005, Malayalam), Nayika (2011, Malayalam) and Stalin (2006, Telugu).

She owns a chocolate factory named Lotus Chocolates. She was elected as a Member of Parliament on Telugu Desam Party ticket from her native town of Tenali. She was one of WCC members of Hema Committee report.

== Awards ==
=== National Film Awards ===
- 1968 - National Film Award for Best Actress : Thulabharam (Malayalam)
- 1972 - National Film Award for Best Actress : Swayamvaram (Malayalam)
- 1977 - National Film Award for Best Actress : Nimajjanam (Telugu)

=== Tamil Nadu State Film Awards ===
- 2013 - Kalaimamani for contributions to Tamil cinema

=== Kerala State Film Awards ===
- 1970 - Kerala State Film Award for Best Actress – Thriveni & Thara
- 2024 - J. C. Daniel Award for outstanding contributions to Malayalam cinema

=== Filmfare Awards South ===
- 1987 - Filmfare Award for Best Actress – Malayalam : Oru Minnaminunginte Nurunguvettam
- 1996 – Filmfare Lifetime Achievement Award - South

=== Nandi Awards ===
- 1984 - Nandi Award for Best Supporting Actress - Bobbili Brahmanna
- 2010 - NTR National Award for Lifetime Achievement

=== Other awards ===
- 1970 - Bengal Film Journalists' Association (BFJA) Award for Best Actress in Hindi – Samaj Ko Badal Dalo
- 2017 - Prem Nazir Award
- 1999 - Honorary doctorate from Potti Sreeramulu Telugu University
- 2020 - Vanitha Film Awards - Lifetime Achievement Award

== Notable filmography ==
=== Telugu ===
Year	Film	Character	Remarks
1955	Kanyasulkam	Minor role	Debut film
1961	Iddaru Mitrulu	Meena	
1961	Tandrulu Kodukulu		
1962	Atma Bandhuvu		
1963	Valmiki		
1963	Thobuttuvulu	Rukmini	
1964	Dagudu Moothalu		
1964	Mairavana		
1964	Murali Krishna	Srilatha	
1965	Chaduvukonna Bharya		
1966	Shrimati		
1966	Bhakta Potana		
1968	Mana Samsaram		
1969	Sri Rama Katha	Sita and Mahalakshmi	
1969	Manushulu Marali		
1970	Sambarala Rambabu		
1970	Pasidi Manasulu		
1970	Sisindri Chittibabu		
1971	Chelleli Kapuram		
1971	Jeevitha Chakram	Kamala	
1971	Sati Ansuya		
1971	Pagabattina Paduchu		
1971	Amayakuralu		
1972	Kalam Marindi		
1972	Manavudu Danavudu		
1973	Devudu Chesina Manushulu		
1973	Sarada	Insane Woman	
1973	Vishali		
1973	Mayadari Malligadu		
1973	Mallamma Katha		
1973	Ida Lokam		
1973	Abhimanavanthulu		
1974	Urvasi		
1974	Radhamma Pelli		
1974	Premalu Pellilu		
1974	Palle Paduchu		
1974	Harathi		
1974	Devudu Chesina Pelli		
1974	Tulabharam	Radha/Roja	
1974	Adambaralu Anubhandalu		
1975	Balipeetam	Aruna	
1975	Zamindarugari Ammayi	Parvathi	
1975	Vykunthapalli		
1975	Saubhagyavati		
1975	Bharati		
1976	Suprabhatam		
1976	Mahatmudu		
1976	Nimajjanam	Brahmin housewife	National Film Award for Best Actress; Nominated - Filmfare Award for Best Actress – Telugu
1977	Daana Veera Soora Karna	Draupadi	
1977	Swarganiki Nitchenalu		
1977	Bhale Alludu		
1978	Indra Dhanussu	Shanti and Latha	Double Role
1978	Navodayam		
1978	Shivamettina Satyam		
1979	Gorintaku		
1979	Karthika Deepam		
1979	Priya Bandhavi		
1979	Captain Krishna		
1980	Sardar Papa Rayudu	Seeta	
1980	Sannayi Appanna		
1980	Ramudu Parashuramudu		
1980	Rajadhi Raju		
1980	Mangala Gauri		
1980	Sivamethina Satyam	Radha	
1980	Kodallu Vasthunaru Jagratha	Janaki	
1980	Kaliyuga Ravana Surudu		
1980	Alludu Pattina Bharatham		
1980	Alayam		
1981	Nyayam Kavali	Lawyer Shakuntala	
1981	O Amma Katha		
1981	Prema Natakam	Sarada	
1981	Alludugaru Zindabad		
1982	Nipputho Chelagatam	Mrs. Ganga Kumar	
1982	Justice Chowdary	Radha	
1982	Prathikaram	Lakshmi	
1982	Jagannatha Rathachakralu		
1983	Swarajyam		
1983	Raghu Ramudu		
1983	Poratam		
1983	Kumkuma Tilakam		
1983	Kaliyuga Daivam		
1983	Kala Yamudu		
1983	Durga Devi		
1983	Chanda Sasanudu	Bhuvaneswari Devi	
1983	Bandhipottu Rudramma		
1983	Bahudoorapu Batasari		
1983	Aalaya Sikharam		
1984	Bobbili Brahmanna	Savitri	wife of Brahmanna
1984	Ugra Roopam		
1984	Rowdy	Shantha	
1984	Raaraju		
1984	Marchandi Mana Chattalu		
1984	Katha Nayakudu		
1984	Janani Janmabhoomi	Kachyayani	
1984	Iddaru Dongalu		
1984	Sardar	Bharati	
1984	Chadarangam		
1984	Swathi	Saraswathi	
1984	Bharyamani		
1984	Bharatamlo Sankharavam		
1985	Adavi Donga	Vasundhara	
1985	Vijetha	Saraswathi	
1985	Pattabhishekham		
1985	Palnati Simham	Nagamani Devi	
1985	Maha Sangramam		
1985	Intiko Rudramma		
1985	Illaliko Pariksha		
1985	Devalayam		
1985	Bhale Tammudu		
1985	Bebbuli Veta		
1985	Agni Parvatam	Janaki	
1985	Raktha Sindhuram		
1986	Anasuyamma Gari Alludu	Anasuyamma	
1986	Apoorva Sahodarulu		
1986	Prathidwani		
1986	Deshoddharakudu		
1986	Dharma Peetam Daddarillindi		
1986	Krishna Garadi		
1986	Jailu Pakshi		
1986	Mister Bharath		
1986	Khaidi Rudrayya		
1986	Kondaveeti Raja		
1986	Muddula Krishnayya		
1986	Kaliyuga Krishnudu		
1986	Ravana Brahma		
1987	Sardar Krishnama Naidu		
1987	Agni Putrudu	Brahmaramba	
1987	Collector Gari Abbai	Laxmi Devi	
1987	Bhargava Ramudu		
1987	Kulala Kurukshetram		
1987	Lawyer Bharti Devi		
1987	Muddayi		
1987	Presidentgari Abbayi		
1987	Saradamba		
1987	Ramu	Gayatri Devi	
1987	Ajeyudu	Tulasi	
1987	Repati Swarajyam		
1987	Rotation Chakravarthi		
1987	Samrat	Rajyalakshmi	
1987	Prajaswamyam	Rajeshwari	
1987	Sankharavam		
1988	Brahma Puthrudu		
1988	Dharma Teja		
1988	Donga Ramudu		
1988	Illu Illalu Priyuralu		
1988	Chattamtho Chadarangam	Lalitha	
1988	Maa Telugu Talli		
1988	Prajaswayam		
1988	Rakthabishekam		
1988	Raktha Tilakam	Nagamani	
1988	Rowdy No.1		
1988	Agni Keratalu	Rajeshwari Devi	
1988	Samsaram	Lakshmi	
1989	Bhale Donga	SP Indrani	
1989	Dhruva Nakshatram	Bharathi Devi	
1989	Goonda Rajyam		
1989	Manchi Kutumbam	Savithri	
1989	Parthudu	Soubhagya	
1989	Raktha Kanneeru	Sarojini	
1989	State Rowdy	SP Laajmani M. Rao	
1990	Kadapa Reddamma		
1990	Nari Nari Naduma Murari	Sesha Rathnam	
1990	Adadhi	Acchamamba	
1990	Kondaveeti Donga	Sambhavi	
1990	Dr. Bhavani		
1990	Lorry Driver	Collector Lalitha Devi	
1990	Aggiramudu	Justice Janaki Devi	
1990	Dagudumuthala Dampathyam	Lalitha	
1990	Prema Khaidi	Jailor	
1991	Amma Rajinama	Amma (Mother)	Nominated - Filmfare Award for Best Actress – Telugu
1991	Coolie No.1		
1991	Jagannatakam	Manikyamma	
1991	Prayathnam		
1991	Killer	Malavika	
1991	Nayakuralu		
1992	Mother India	Rajyalakshmi	
1992	Pellante Noorella Panta	Vasanthi	
1993	Major Chandrakanth	Savitri	
1993	Mechanic Alludu	Lakshmi	
1993	Pelli Gola		
1993	Evandi Aavida Vachindi	Janaki	
1994	Bobbili Simham		
1994	Atha Kodallu		
1994	President Gari Alludu	Prabhavati	
1994	Srivari Priyuralu		
1995	Leader	Kausalya	
1996	Nayanamma		
1998	Anthahpuram	Narasimha's wife	
2003	Tholi Choopulone		
2005	Sankranthi	Mother	
2006	Stalin	Stalin's mother	
2007	Aata	Narasimha's wife	
2007	Yogi	Shantamma	
2013	Sukumarudu	Vardanamma	

=== Malayalam ===
Year	Title	Role	Notes
1965	Shakuntala	Priyamvadha	
1965	Kaliyodam	Rani	
1966	Inapraavugal	Rahel	
1966	Pareeksha	Yamuna	
1966	Kattuthulasi	Lalitha	
1966	Murappennu	Bhagiradhi	
1966	Rajamalli	Rajamalli	
1966	Thilothama	Vimala	
1966	Jail	Valsala	
1966	Pakalkkinavu	Malathy	
1966	Manikyakottaram	Thankam	
1966	Karuna	Sharadha	
1966	Kanmanikal	Shantha	
1966	Archana	Malathi	
1967	Kavalam Chundan	Sarada	
1967	Kasavuthattam	Jameela	
1967	Chithramela	Sarassu	Segment: "Apaswarangal"
1967	Iruttinte Athmavu	Ammukutty	
1967	Udhyogastha	Vimala	
1967	Thalirukal	Omana	
1967	Mulkireedam	Jancy	
1967	Arakkillam	Geetha	
1967	Pareeksha	Yamuna	
1968	Karthika	Karthika	
1968	Agni Pareeksha	Hemalatha	
1968	Kadal	Mary	
1968	Kaliyalla Kalyanam	Saraswathy	
1968	Karutha Pournami	Kunjumol	
1968	Manaswini	Malathi	
1968	Yakshi	Ragini	
1968	Hotel High Range	Nalini	
1968	Midumidukki	Radha	
1968	Punnapra Vayalar	Malathi	
1968	Aparadhini	Meenu	
1968	Asuravithu	Meenakshi	
1968	Thulabharam	Vijaya	National Film Award for Best Actress
1969	Nadi	Stella	
1969	Janmabhoomi	Jaya	
1969	Aalmaram		
1969	Adimakal	Ponnamma	
1969	Jwala	Kunjomana, Kunjammini	double role
1969	Koottukudumbam	Shyamala	
1969	Vilakuranja Manushyan	Devi	
1969	Vilakkapetta Bendhangal	Indhu	
1969	Kattukurangu	Minikutty	
1969	Mooladhanam	Sarada	
1969	Sandhya	Sandhya	
1969	Soosi	Susie	
1969	Veettumrugam	Radhika	
1969	Velliyazhcha	Radha	
1970	Ammayenna Sthree	Vijaya	
1970	Thriveni	Thankamma	
1970	Stree	Savithri	
1970	Mindapennu	Kunjulakshmi	
1970	Kakkathamburatti	Janamma	
1970	Kuttavali	Ponnamma	
1970	Cross Belt	Ammu	
1970	Ambalapravu	Adv. Indhulekha	
1970	Pearl View	Stella	
1970	Thara	Vasanthi/Thara	
1971	Inqulab Zindabbad		
1971	Aabhijathyam	Malathy	
1971	Panchavan Kaadu	Minnukutty	
1971	Vilakku Vangiya Veena	Sarada	
1971	Navavadhu	Sreedevi	
1972	Theerthayathra	Savithri/Thaathrikkutty	
1972	Anweshanam	Valsala	
1972	Brahmachari	Sreedevi/Vasanthy	
1972	Maaya	Gomathi	
1972	Gandharavakshetram	Lakshmi	
1972	Professor	Lakshmi	
1972	Swayamvaram	Seeta	National Film Award for Best Actress
1972	Sree Guruvayoorappan		
1972	Snehadeepame Mizhi Thurakku	Reena	
1973	Veendum Prabhatham	Lakshmi	
1973	Udayam	Geetha	
1973	Jeevitham		
1973	Enippadikal	Thankamma	
1973	Thekkan Kattu	Shoshamma	
1973	Bhadradeepam	Rajani	
1973	Divyadharsanam		
1974	Oru Pidi Ari		
1975	Raagam	Priyamvada	
1975	Thiruvonam	Radhika	
1975	Abhimaanam	Indu	
1976	Paalkkadal	Sujatha	
1976	Amrithavaahini	Geetha	
1976	Kanyaadaanam		
1976	Chennai Valarthiya Kutty	Chellamma	
1977	Nurayum Pathayum		
1977	Hridayame Sakshi	Kamala	
1977	Aparaajitha		
1977	Amme Anupame		
1977	Aaraadhana	Sharadha	
1977	Anjali		
1977	Itha Ivide Vare	Janu	
1977	Vishukkani	Rajani	
1977	Randu Lokam	Shanta	
1977	Sreedevi	Sreedevi	
1977	Taxi Driver		
1978	Mannu	Paru	
1978	Asthamayam	Shanthi	
1978	Ithaanente Vazhi	Malathi	
1978	Sundarimaarude Swapnangal		
1978	Society Lady		
1978	Rowdy Ramu	Santhi	
1978	Raghuvamsham		
1978	Onappudava		
1978	Manoradham		
1978	Maattoly	Malathi	
1978	Anubhoothikalude Nimisham		
1978	Thacholi Ambu		Guest role
1979	Indradhanussu		
1979	Ward No. 7		
1979	Pushyaraagam	Saraswathi	
1979	Pichathy Kuttappan	Thankamma	
1979	Ente Sneham Ninakku Mathram		
1980	Akalangalil Abhayam	Bharghavi aka Ammini	
1980	Ivar	Savithri/Margaret	
1980	Swarga Devatha		
1980	Adhikaram	Vimala	
1982	Elippathayam	Rajamma	
1982	Ponmudy	Madhavi	
1982	Anguram	Malini	
1983	Lekhayude Maranam Oru Flashback	Geetha	
1983	Anantham Ajnatham		
1983	Nizhal Moodiya Nirangal	Shoshamma	
1987	Oru Minnaminunginte Nurunguvettam	Saraswathi Teacher	Filmfare Award for Best Actress
1994	Kashmeeram	Justice Usha Varma	
2002	Mazhathullikkilukkam	Anna John	
2005	Rappakal	Saraswathiyamma	
2011	Naayika	Older Gracy	
2012	Kalikaalam	Devaki Teacher	
2015	Ammakkoru Tharattu	Sulakshana	

=== Tamil ===
Year	Title	Role	Notes
1963	Kunkhumam	Susila	Debut in Tamil
1963	Thulasi Maadam		
1964	Arunagirinathar	Gnanavalli	
1964	Vazhkai Vazhvadarke	Chandra	
1969	Thulabaram	Vijaya	
1972	Gnana Oli	Mary	
1974	Thayi Pirandhal	Lakshmi	
1975	Ninaithadhai Mudippavan	Seetha	
1976	Mazhai Megam	Aruna / Suguna	
1976	Ennai Pol Oruvan	Laxmi	
1977	Aval Thandha Uravu		
1977	Chakravarthi	Shanthi	
1978	Pudhu Seruppu Kadikkum		
1984	Sarithira Nayagan	Varalakshmi	
1986	Mr. Bharath	Shanti	
1998	Anthapuram	Narasimha's wife	

=== Hindi ===
Year	Title	Role	Notes
1970	Samaj Ko Badal Dalo	Chhaya	
1973	Agni Rekha	Nirmala Thakur	
1980	Pratishodh		
1982	Sindoor Bane Jwala		
1982	Main Intequam Loonga	Mrs.Ganga Kumar	
1984	Sardar		
1996	Sabse Bada Mawali	Malvika	
2008	Yaar Meri Zindagi	Radha	Started in 1971

=== Kannada ===
Year	Title	Role	Notes
1963	Valmiki		
1978	Maathu Tappada Maga	Latha	
1983	Simha Gharjane	Sharada	
1984	Thayi Mamathe		
1984	Pralaya Rudra		

== See also ==
- Sheela
- Jayabharathi
