= Panchavan Kaadu =

- Directed by: Kunchacko
- Written by: Vaikkom Chandrasekharan Nair
- Screenplay by: Thoppil Bhasi
- Produced by: M. Kunchacko
- Starring: Prem Nazir; Sathyan; Sheela; Sharada
- Cinematography: R. C. Purushothaman
- Edited by: S. P. S. Veerappan
- Music by: G. Devarajan
- Production company: Udaya
- Distributed by: Udaya
- Release date: 3 September 1971
- Country: India
- Language: Malayalam

Panchavan Kaadu is a 1971 Indian Malayalam-language film directed and produced by Kunchacko. The film stars Prem Nazir, Sathyan, Sheela and Sharada. The film has musical score by G. Devarajan.

== Cast ==
- Prem Nazir as Kochu Kurup, younger brother
- Sathyan as Ananda Kurup, elder brother
- Sheela as Kochu Thankachi
- Sharada as Minnukutty
- Ragini as Unniyamma
- Hari as Warrior
- Adoor Pankajam as Nangeli
- Alummoodan as Chindan Pilla
- G. K. Pillai as Thanu Pilla
- K. P. Ummer as Marthanda Varma
- Kottayam Chellappan as Arumukham Pilla
- N. Govindankutty as Muthuppayyan
- Paravoor Bharathan as Fisherman
- Rajamma as Servant
- S. P. Pillai as Kannappan
- Ushakumari as Devamma
- Veeran as Ramayyar
- Vijaya Kumari as Naniyachi

== Soundtrack ==
The music was composed by G. Devarajan with lyrics by Vayalar Ramavarma.

No.	Song	Singers	Lyrics	Length (m:ss)
1	"Chuvappukallu Mookkuthi"	P. Madhuri	Vayalar Ramavarma	
2	"Kallippaalakal Poothu"	K. J. Yesudas	Vayalar Ramavarma	
3	"Manmadha Pournami"	P. Susheela	Vayalar Ramavarma	
4	"Raajashilpi"	P. Susheela	Vayalar Ramavarma	
5	"Sringaara Roopini"	P. Susheela, Chorus	Vayalar Ramavarma	
