= Vilakku Vangiya Veena =

- Directed by: P. Bhaskaran
- Written by: Sreekumaran Thampi
- Screenplay by: Sreekumaran Thampi
- Produced by: P. Bhaskaran
- Starring: Prem Nazir; Madhu; Sharada; KPAC Lalitha
- Cinematography: S. J. Thomas
- Edited by: K. Sankunni
- Music by: V. Dakshinamoorthy
- Production company: Suchithramanjari
- Distributed by: Suchithramanjari
- Release date: 24 December 1971
- Country: India
- Language: Malayalam

Vilakku Vangiya Veena (transl. Veena bought on price) is a 1971 Indian Malayalam film, directed and produced by P. Bhaskaran. The film stars Prem Nazir, Madhu, Sharada and KPAC Lalitha in the lead roles. The film had musical score by V. Dakshinamoorthy.

== Plot ==
Sarada, who is in love with Vijayan, a struggling singer, decides to sell her gold to send him to Madras to pursue his career. However, things change when he becomes successful and forgets about her.

== Cast ==
- Prem Nazir as Vijayan
- Madhu as Venu
- Sharada as Sarada
- KPAC Lalitha as Vijayan's Sister Geetha
- Jayabharathi as Sunanda
- Adoor Bhasi as Menon
- Jose Prakash as KR Das
- Sankaradi as Sankarappillai
- T. R. Omana as Nirmala
- T. S. Muthaiah as Raghavan
- Paul Vengola SKariya Mappila
- Abbas as Money Lender
- Adoor Bhavani as Parvathy
- Bahadoor as Prathapan
- Girish Kumar
- M. J. Menon
- Vanchiyoor Radha

== Soundtrack ==
All music is composed by V. Dakshinamoorthy

No.	Title	Lyrics	Artist(s)	Length
1.	"Aval Chirichal"	Sreekumaran Thampi	K. J. Yesudas
2.	"Devagaayakane"	Sreekumaran Thampi	K. P. Brahmanandan
3.	"Ekaantha Jeevanil"	P. Bhaskaran	K. J. Yesudas
4.	"Iniyurangoo"	P. Bhaskaran	S. Janaki
5.	"Iniyurangoo" (Pathos)	P. Bhaskaran	S. Janaki
6.	"Innathe Raathri"	P. Bhaskaran	B. Vasantha
7.	"Izhanonthu Thakarnnoru"	Sreekumaran Thampi	K. J. Yesudas
8.	"Kaattile Paazhmulam"	P. Bhaskaran	K. J. Yesudas
9.	"Kaliyum Chiriyum Maari"	P. Bhaskaran	P. Jayachandran
10.	"Naranaayingane"	Traditional	B. Vasantha
11.	"Sukhamevide Dukhamevide"	Sreekumaran Thampi	K. J. Yesudas
