= Navavadhu =

- Directed by: P. Bhaskaran
- Written by: S. L. Puram Sadanandan
- Screenplay by: S. L. Puram Sadanandan
- Produced by: AL Sreenivasan
- Starring: Prem Nazir; Sharada; Sukumari; Adoor Bhasi
- Cinematography: V. Selvaraj
- Edited by: V. P. Krishnan
- Music by: G. Devarajan
- Production company: ALS Productions
- Distributed by: ALS Productions
- Release date: 9 April 1971
- Country: India
- Language: Malayalam

Navavadhu is a 1971 Indian Malayalam-language film, directed by P. Bhaskaran and produced by A. L. Sreenivasan. The film stars Prem Nazir, Sharada, Sukumari and Adoor Bhasi. The film had musical score by G. Devarajan.

== Cast ==
- Shanavas as Chandran
- Bala Singh as Rajan
- Prem Nazir
- Sharada
- Sukumari
- Adoor Bhasi
- Thikkurissy Sukumaran Nair
- Sreelatha Namboothiri
- T. S. Muthaiah
- Philomina
- Santhakumari as Parvathyamma

== Soundtrack ==
The music was composed by G. Devarajan and the lyrics were written by Vayalar Ramavarma.

No.	Song	Singers	Lyrics	Length (m:ss)
1	"Ammayum Nee"	P. B. Sreenivas	Vayalar Ramavarma	
2	"Eeshwarante Thirumozhi"	K. J. Yesudas	Vayalar Ramavarma	
3	"Priyathama Priyathama"	P. B. Sreenivas, Chorus	Vayalar Ramavarma	
4	"Priye Nin Pramadavanathil"	K. J. Yesudas	Vayalar Ramavarma	
5	"Raathriyam Rambhaykku"	L. R. Eeswari	Vayalar Ramavarma	
