= Thettu =

- Directed by: K. S. Sethumadhavan
- Written by: P. Ayyaneth
- Screenplay by: K. S. Sethumadhavan
- Produced by: C. C. Baby
- Starring: Sathyan, K.P. Ummer, Bahadoor, Paravoor Bharathan, Sheela, Philomina, Sadhana, Sumathi, T.R. Omana etc
- Cinematography: C. Namasivayam
- Edited by: P. V. Narayanan
- Music by: G. Devarajan
- Production company: MS Productions
- Distributed by: MS Productions
- Release date: April 1971
- Country: India
- Language: Malayalam
- Box office: A commercial success

Thettu is a 1971 Indian Malayalam film, directed by K. S. Sethumadhavan, who also wrote the screenplay, and produced by C. C. Baby. The film stars Sathyan and Sheela in the lead roles. The film had musical score by G. Devarajan.

== Cast ==
- Sathyan as Johnny
- Sheela as Baby
- Kamalam as Ammini
- Prema as Lissi
- Shobha as Child Artist
- T. R. Omana as Thangamma
- Baby Sumathi as Mini
- Bahadoor as Kochappi
- K.P. Ummer as Mathew
- Leela as Saramma
- Murali
- Paravoor Bharathan as Kurian
- Philomina as Eli
- Sadhana as Kukku
- Veeran as Paili

== Soundtrack ==
The music was composed by G. Devarajan and the lyrics were written by Vayalar Ramavarma.

No.	Song	Singers	Lyrics	Length (m:ss)
1	"Inakkam Pinakkam"	K. J. Yesudas	Vayalar Ramavarma	
2	"Kunnumpurathoru Minnalaattam"	P. Madhuri	Vayalar Ramavarma	
3	"Nadannal Neeyoru"	K. J. Yesudas	Vayalar Ramavarma	
4	"Palliyaramana"	P. Susheela	Vayalar Ramavarma	
5	"Thettu Thettu Ithu"	K. J. Yesudas	Vayalar Ramavarma	
