= Vithukal =

- Directed by: P. Bhaskaran
- Written by: M. T. Vasudevan Nair
- Screenplay by: M. T. Vasudevan Nair
- Produced by: P Bhaskaran
- Starring: Madhu; Sheela; Sukumari; Kaviyoor Ponnamma
- Cinematography: S. J. Thomas
- Edited by: K. Sankunni
- Music by: Pukazhenthi
- Production company: Aradhana Movies
- Distributed by: Aradhana Movies
- Release date: 30 April 1971
- Country: India
- Language: Malayalam

Vithukal is a 1971 Indian Malayalam-language film directed and produced by P. Bhaskaran. The film stars Madhu, Sheela, Sukumari and Kaviyoor Ponnamma in the lead roles. The film has musical score by Pukazhenthi.

== Cast ==
- Madhu as Unnikrishnan
- Sheela as Sarojini
- Sukumari as Sarada
- Kaviyoor Ponnamma as Ammini
- Adoor Bhasi as Eravan Nair
- Sankaradi as Achuthan Nair
- Kannan
- Adoor Bhavani as Amma
- Baby Indira
- Balakrishna Menon
- K. P. Ummer as Chandran
- N. Govindankutty as Raghavan
- Nambiar
- Raghava Menon
- Vanchiyoor Radha as Madhavi
- Renuka
- P. R. Menon

== Soundtrack ==
The music was composed by Pukazhenthi and the lyrics were written by P. Bhaskaran.

| No. | Song | Singers | Lyrics | Length (m:ss) |
|---|---|---|---|---|
| 1 | "Apaarasundara Neelaakaasham" | K. J. Yesudas | P. Bhaskaran | |
| 2 | "Gopuramukalil" | S. Janaki | P. Bhaskaran | |
| 3 | "Ingu Sookshikkunnu" | K. J. Yesudas | P. Bhaskaran | |
| 4 | "Maranadevanoru" | K. J. Yesudas | P. Bhaskaran | |
| 5 | "Yaathrayaakkunnu Sakhi Ninne" | K. J. Yesudas | P. Bhaskaran | |
