= Vijayanarayanam =

Vijayanarayanam is a village located in Tirunelveli district of Tamil Nadu, India. It has a population of 11,564 according to the 2001 census.
