= Kottayam Santha =

Indian actress and dubbing artist

- Born: Kottayam, Travancore
- Died: 27 April 2007; Olassa, Kottayam
- Occupation: Actress
- Years active: 1963–2006

Kottayam Santha was an Indian actress and dubbing artist best known for her work in Malayalam cinema. She had acted in more than 300 films and several TV serials like Valayam, Krishnakripasagaram etc. She dubbed for almost 1,000 films. She was the voice for Seema in almost all her Malayalam films.

== Biography ==
Kottayam Santha was born at Kottayam. She entered the cinema field through M Krishnan Nair's film Aniyathi. She was the founder and chief patron of Sthree Sakthi Samajam, a women's rights protection organisation. She died on 27 April 2007.

== Filmography ==
=== As an actress ===
- Prajapathi (2006) as Guest role
- Mukhamariyaathe (2006) as Thampuratti
- Palunku (2006) as Ammayi
- Jalolsavam(2004) as Jose's mother
- Kasthoorimaan (2003) as Sajan's grandmother
- Ladies & Gentlemen (2001) as Mrs.Perera
- Stalin Sivadas (1999) as Manju's mother
- Kaliveedu (1996) as Dr. Gonzales's mother
- Swarnachamaram (1996)
- Easwaramoorthy IN (1996) as Ramesh's mother
- Kanjirapally Kariyachan (1996) as Kuttappayi's mother
- Boxer (1995) as Jimmy's mother
- Pakshe (1994) as Nandini's mother
- Commissioner (1994) as Indu's mother
- Manichitrathazhu (1993) as Mother Superior
- Oru Kochu Bhoomikulukkam (1992) as Viji's mother
- Manyanmar (1992) as Thomas's mother
- Abhayam (1991)
- Pavam Pavam Rajakumaran (1990) as Gopalakrishnan's mother
- Ezhuthappurangal (1987)
- Vivaahithare Ithile (1986)
- Vellam (1985)
- Ozhivukaalam (1985) as Das's mother
- Rangam (1985) as Matron
- Thammil Thammil (1985) as Dr. Susan
- Oru Nokku Kanan (1985) as Sister Agnes
- Manassariyathe (1984) as Mohan's mother
- Oru Kochu Swapnam (1984) as Matron
- Ente Upasana (1984) as Mother Superior
- Manase Ninakku Mangalam (1984) as Damodara Kuruppu's sister
- Aattuvanchi Ulanjappol (1984) as Rohiniyamma
- Chakkarayumma (1984)
- Iniyenkilum (1983) as Saraswathy
- Shesham Kazhchayil (1983) as Swimmer's wife
- Bandham (1983)
- Koodevide (1983) as Captain Thomas's mother
- Oru Kunju Janikkunnu - Mathrika Kudumbam (1982)
- Ankuram (1982)
- Velicham Vitharunna Penkutty (1982)
- Ente Shathrukkal/Porattam (1982)
- Ruby My Darling (1982)
- Ellam Ninakku Vendi (1981) as Bharathi
- Kilinjalgal (1981) as Mrs.Thomas Tamil film
- Rajneegandhi (1980)
- Meen (1980) as Thresia
- Chandrabhimbham (1980)
- Swargadevatha (1980)
- Ithikkarappakki (1980)
- Aaravam (1980) as Mrs.Murukayya
- Ethikkara Pakky (1980) as Kalyani
- Kannukal (1979) as Karthyayani
- Idavazhiyile Poocha Mindapoocha (1979) as Cheriyamma
- Sarapanjaram (1979) as Lakshmiyamma
- Anubhavangale Nandi (1979)
- Kathirmandapam (1979)
- Lovely (1979)
- Iniyum Kaanaam (1979) as Parvathiyamma
- Eeta (1978)
- Nivedyam (1978)
- Nakshathrangale Kaaval (1978)
- Snehathinte Mukhangal (1978) as Lakshmi's mother
- Aaravam (1978) as Murukayya's wife
- Balapareekshanam (1978) as Raji's mother
- Avar Jeevikkunnu (1978)
- Adimakkachavadam (1978)
- Puthariyankam (1978)
- Agninakshathram (1977)
- Rathimanmadhan (1977)
- Anthardhaaham (1977) as Valyamma
- Yatheem (1977)
- Nadeenadanmaare Aavasyamundu (1974)
- Baalya Prathijna (Purusharathnam) (1972) as Ammini
- Theerthayathra (1972)
- Sthree (1970) as Naaniyamma
- Ambalapraavu (1970) as Nani Amma
- Priya (1970)
- Abhayam (1970) as Devakiyamma
- Nizhalattam (1970) as Mrs. Nair
- Aa Chithrashalabham Parannotte (1970)
- Amma Enna Sthree
- Anadha (1970)
- Kallichellamma (1969)
- Kattu Kurangu (1969)
- Vila Kuranja Manushyan (1969)
- Viruthan Shanku (1968) as Nanukutty
- Padunna Puzha (1968) as Radhamma
- Manswini (1968) as Alamelu
- N.G.O (1967)
- Awal (1967)
- Pareeksha (1967)
- Anveshichu Kandethiyilla (1967) as Cheriyamma
- Bhagyamudra (1967)
- Sthanarthi Saramma (1966)
- Chemmeen (1966)
- Kalithozhan (1966)
- Muthalali (1965) as Meenakshi
- Kochumon (1965) as Meena
- Rajamalli (1965) as Manka
- Bhargavi Nilayam (1964) as Suma
- Aadya Kiranagal (1964) as Vasanthy
- Ammaye Kaanaan (1963) as Janaki Amma
- Moodupadam (1963)
- Ninamaninja Kalpadukal (1963) as Lisy
- Doctor (1963)
- Jnaanasundari (1961) as Melitta
- Mariakutty (1958) as Mariakutty's friend
- Jailppulli (1957) as Lakshmi
- Paadatha Painkili (1957)
- Manthravadi (1956)
- Aniyathi (1955)

=== As a singer ===
- Padathalir Thozhunnen ...(Sabarimala Ayyappan, 1961)
- Kannukalil Kavanayumaay ...(Bhaagyajaathakam, 1962)
- Keledi Ninne Njaan ...(Doctor, 1963)
- Malaranikkaadukal ... (Ramanan, 1967)
- Kaalamenna Kaaranavarkku ...(Kallichellamma, 1969)
- Ambambo Jeevikkan ...(Naalumanippookkal, 1978)

=== As a dubbing artist ===
- Sindhu (1979) Lakshmi
- Utsavam (1975)
- Mohiniyattam (1976) Lakshmi
- Angeekaram (1977) Prameela
- Sarapancharam (1977) Priya
- Swarangal Swapnangal (1978) Lalithasree
- Marmmaram (1983) Jalaja
- Chandhrahasam (1979) Seema
- Dhanya (1978)
- Shikharangal (1979)
- Nadhi Muthal Nadhi Vare (1983) Lakshmi
- Tholkkan Enikku Manassilla (1981)
- America America( 1986) Seema, Lakshmi
- Panchamrutham(1978)
- Rugma (1984) Seema
- Anubandham (1985)Seema
- Vartha (1986) Seema
- Akkareyanente Manasam (1985)
- Shobana * Sindhoora Sandhyakku Mounam (1986) Jayabharathi
- Sandhyakku Virinja Poovu (1984) Seema
- Oru Kochu Swapnam (1984) Seema
- Anujathi (1977)
- Mukthi (1987) Seema
- Snehikkan Samayamilla (1981)
- Moorkhan (1981)
- Aavanazhi (1986) Seema
- Choodatha Pookkal (1985) Lakshmi
- Athirathram(1984)Seema
- Vasanthasena (1995) Seema
- Adiyozhukkukal (1995)Seema
- Adimakal Udamakal (1996)Seema
- Lakshmana Rekha (1984) Seema
- Thirakkil Alpa Samayam (1994) Seema
- Manushyamrugam (1981)Seema
- Ormayilennum(1984)Seema
- Abkari (1996)
- Mattoral (1995) Seema
- Naanayam (1986) Seema
- Iniyenkilum (1986)Seema
- Ithrayum Kaalam (1985)Seema
- Shathrusamharam (1980)
- Chuvanna Chirakukal (1978) Sharmila Tagore
- Panchapandavar (1983)
- Gangster (1981)
- An Evening in Paris (1983)
- Garjanam (1983) Madhavi
- Benz Vasu (1981)Unnimery
- Thusharam (1982) Seema
- John JafarJanarthanan (1984)
- Vishwaroopam (1986)
- Eeta (1978) Seema
- Angadi (1981) Seema
- Sakthi (1980) Seema
- Kaanamarayathu (1985) Seema
- Karimbana (1979) Seema
- Njan Njan Maathram (1980) Seema
- Meen (1980) Seema
- Vicharana (1994) Seema
- Innalenkill Naale (1986)Seema
- 1921 (1984) Seema
- Ahimsa (1983) Seema
- Chaakara (1981) Seema
- Karimpoovinakkare (1986) Seema
- Ezham Kadalinakkare (1980)Seema
- Thadakom (1983) Seema
- Deepam (1981) Seema
- Soothrakkari (1979)
- Adavukal 18 (1979)
- Manasa Vacha Karmana (1978)Seema
- Sathyam (1980)
- Anthapuram (1978) Seema
- Ammayum Makalum (1980) Seema
- Theenalangal (1981)
- Aashirvadam (1983)
- Kappal kairali (1983)
- Komaram (1983)
- Sankharsham (1983)
- Sphodanam (1978) Seema
- Maniyara (1983) Seema
- Manassoru Mahaasamudram (1978) Seema
- Nishedi (1984)
- Kodathi (1984) Seema
- Ivide Ingane (1995) Seema
- Oru Smangaliyude Kadha (1984)Seema
- Sandharbham (1994) Seema
- Janakeeya Kodathi (1995)
- Guruji Oru Vaakku (1994) Seema
- Pappan Priyapetta Pappan (1986)
- Njan Kathorthirikkam (1996)
- Ashtabandham (1997) Seema
- Ente Sabdham (1997)
- Koodanayum Kaattu (1996) Seema
- Ee kaikalil (1995) Seema
- Iniyethra Dooram (1984)
- Naalkkavala (1994) Seema
- Sarvakalashala (1996) Seema
- Ayitham (1984) Seema
- Mahayanam (1984)
- Puthiya Velicham (1978)
- Kaamini (1978)
- Thettu (1977)
- Sooryavamsham (1979)
- Pichathy Kuttappan (1979) Sharada
- Kaavilamma (1977)
- Agnipareekshanam (1980)
- Ladies hostel (1979)
- Anubhoothikalude Nimisham (1979)
- Pattalam Janaki (1979)
- Azhakulka Celina (1978)
- Madhuram Thirumadhuram (1979)
- Achani (1979) Nandita Bose
- Abhayam Thedi (1986)
- Ivanente Priyaputhran (1979)
- Sandhyaragam (1979)
- Pushyaraagam (1979) Sharada
- Raathriyile yathrakkar (1979)
- Jumbulingam (1979)
- Avakasham (1979)
- Orkkuka Vallappozhum (1981)
- Ente Sathrukkal (1986)
- Poonthenaruvi (1979) Nandhitha Bose
- Thadavara (1982) Nandhitha Bose
- Vidaparayum Munpe (1984)
- Orikkal Koodi (1985) Lakshmi
- Boing Boing(1985) Menaka, Lizy, Madhuri, Aswani

== TV serials ==
- Valayam
- Eka Tharakam
- Manasi
- Punarjanmam
- Meera
- Agnisakshi
- Manalnagaram
- Sethuvinte Kathakal

== Dramas ==
- Manushyan
