= S. L. Puram Sadanandan =

Indian screenwriter

- Born: 15 April 1928; S. L. Puram, Kingdom of Travancore, British India (present day Alappuzha, Kerala, India)
- Died: 17 September 2005 (aged 77)
- Spouse: Omana
- Children: 2 (incl. S. L. Puram Jayasurya)

S. L. Puram Sadanandan (15 April 1928 – 17 September 2005) was an Indian playwright and film scriptwriter from Kerala, India.

== Career ==
In 1967, he got the first ever National Film Award for Best Screenplay for the film Agniputhri.

== Personal life ==
Sadanandan was married to Omana Sadanandan. They had two sons, Jayasurya (who directed the films Speed Track, Angel John and Jack & Daniel) and Jayasoma. He died on 17 September 2005.

== Awards ==
- 1965: President's silver medal for Best Feature Film in Malayalam - Kavyamela
- 1967: National Film Award for Best Screenplay - Agniputhri
- 1995: Kerala Sangeetha Nataka Akademi Fellowship
- 1991: Kerala Sangeetha Nataka Akademi Award

The Kerala Sangeetha Nataka Akademi has instituted an annual award, S. L. Puram Sadanandan Memorial Puraskaram, for recognising outstanding contributions to Malayalam theatre.

== Filmography ==
- Chemmeen
- Vilakuranja Manushyan
- Agniputhri
- Kallu Kondoru Pennu
- Kattukuthira
- Yavanika
- Kavyamela
- Bhagyamudra
- Kaadu
- Nellu
- Pathamudayam
- Ivide Thudangunnu
- Aadhya Paadam
- Navavadhu
- Karthika
- Babumon
