= P. Bhaskaran =

Indian film director (1924–2007)

- Born: 21 April 1924; Kodungallur, Kingdom of Cochin, British India (present day Thrissur, Kerala, India)
- Died: 25 February 2007 (aged 82); Thiruvananthapuram, Kerala, India
- Occupations: Poet; Lyricist; Film director; Actor; Journalist
- Spouse: Indira

Pulloottupadathu Bhaskaran (21 April 1924 – 25 February 2007), was an Indian Malayalam language poet, lyricist of Malayalam film songs, and filmmaker. He penned more than 3000 songs for about 250 films. He also directed 44 Malayalam feature films and three documentaries, produced six feature films, and acted in several movies. For his overall contributions to Malayalam cinema, he was awarded J. C. Daniel Award by the Government of Kerala.

He was also a journalist and an All India Radio employee before becoming active in the film industry. He was well known for the simple use of language in his songs and poems.

== Early life ==
P. Bhaskaran was born on 21 April 1924 in Kodungallur in the erstwhile Kingdom of Cochin. His father, Nandyelathu Padmanabha Menon, was a poet, lawyer, journalist, and Indian independence activist. His mother was Pulloottupadathu Ammalu Amma. Bhaskaran got his family name, Pulloottupadathu, through matrilineal succession.

Bhaskaran was the sixth among his parents' nine children. His father died when he was studying in the fifth standard. He started to write poems when in 7th standard. He studied at Maharaja's College, Ernakulam. He used to write poems in a local magazine. For taking part in the August Struggle, he was sentenced to 6 months imprisonment. After getting released, he went to Kozhikode and joined Deshabhimani Weekly.

== Non-film career ==
P. Bhaskaran started to write songs for communist stage performers. His songs were banned in the (then) State of Travancore. His first collection of poems was released under the title Villali. During the Communist Rebellion in Punnapra-Vayalar, he wrote a song titled Vayalar Garjikkunnu (Vayalar Roars) under the pen name Ravi. The song, starting with the lines Uyarum Njan Nadake... rose to legendary stature in the days to come, during which the song was banned and he was expatriated from the (then) State of Travancore as per the orders of Dewan C. P. Ramaswami Iyer. Then he went to Chennai (then Madras) to join the editorial board of the Jayakeralam. He used to write songs for Akashavani, which helped him secure a job in Kozhikode Akashvani. In the 1950s, he got associated with the film industry. He quit his job in Akashavani and went to Chennai to start a full-time film career. The lyrics for the theme song of the Malayalam channel Asianet, starting Shyama Sundara was also written by him.

== Film career ==
P. Bhaskaran's debut as a lyricist was for a Tamil film. He wrote the Malayalam lines for a multi-lingual song in film Apoorva Sagodharargal (1949). The first Malayalam film song for which he wrote lyrics was "Madhumadhuri..." for the film Chandrika (1950). He worked with the director P. Venu in his films Viruthan Shanku (1968), Virunnukari (1969), and Ariyapedatha Rahasiyam (1981) and produced some evergreen songs.

In 1954, Bhaskaran along with Ramu Kariat directed the film Neelakkuyil. The movie is regarded as ushering in social realism in Malayalam cinema. It got the President's silver medal, the first-ever national recognition for a Malayalam film. Two years later, he did his first solo work, titled Rarichan Enna Pouran. It failed at the box office. His films Adyakiranangal (1964), Iruttinte Athmavu (1969), and Thurakkatha Vathil (1971) went on to win National Film Awards for various categories. He also acted in several films including Neelakkuyil. He appeared in the film Manoradham (1978), as a strict family head who has deep faith in astrology. He also directed several documentaries including the award-winning Vallathol.

== Death ==
Bhaskaran suffered from Alzheimer's disease at the end of his life, and could not recognize anyone who worked with him, a notable example being that the noted singer S. Janaki, who sang many songs written by him. The incident goes like this, as told by Ravi Menon, a veteran journalist and music critic, who accompanied Janaki to Bhaskaran's home: When Janaki sang some of her songs written by Bhaskaran, he accompanied her, but could not remember that they were written by him. The last film for which he wrote lyrics was 'Soudamini', released in 2003. He died on 25 February 2007 at his home in Thiruvananthapuram aged 83. He was cremated with full state honors at Thycaud Santhikavadam crematorium. His biography Urangatha Thamburu by Perumpuzha Gopalakrishnan was published by Mathrubhumi Books.

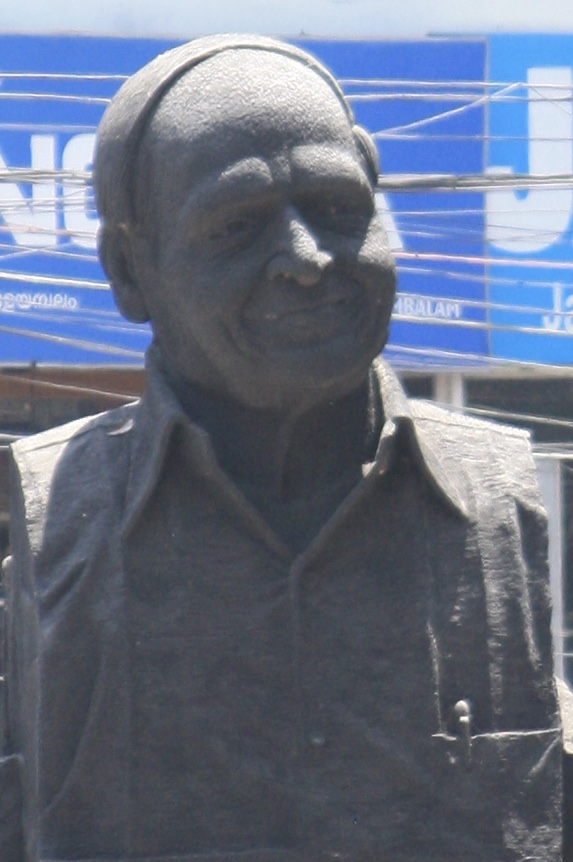
Bust of P. Bhaskaran in Thiruvananthapuram

== Awards ==
=== Literary awards ===
- 1980 – Odakkuzhal Award (Ottakkambiyulla Thamburu)
- 1981 – Kerala Sahitya Akademi Award for Poetry (Ottakkambiyulla Thamburu)
- 1992 – Asan Poetry Prize
- 1997 – Deviprasadam Trust Award
- 2000 – Vallathol Award

=== Film awards ===
National Film Awards

- 1954 – President's silver medal for Best Feature Film in Malayalam (Neelakuyil)
- 1958 – Certificate of Merit for Best Feature Film in Malayalam (Nayaru Pidicha Pulivalu)

Kerala State Film Awards

- 1970 – Best Lyricist (Sthree)
- 1978 – Best Documentary (Vallathol)
- 1985 – Best Lyricist (Kochu Themmadi)
- 1992 – Best Lyricist (Venkalam)
- 1994 – Award for Lifetime Achievement (J. C. Daniel Award)

Asianet Film Awards

- 1999 – Lifetime Achievement Award

== Partial list of songs he wrote ==
- "Kayalarikathu..." (Film: Neelakkuyil)
- "Kuyiline Thedi..." (Film: Neelakkuyil)
- "Ellarum Chollanu..." (Film: Neelakkuyil)
- "Engane Nee Marakkum..." (Film: Neelakkuyil)
- "Thamasamenthe Varuvaan..." (Film: Bhargavi Nilayam)
- "Vannan Vannallo..." (Film: Viruthan Shanku)
- "Vaasantha Sadanathin..." (Film: Virunnukari)
- "Kanana Poikayil Kalabham..." (Film: Ariyapedatha Rahasiyam)
- "Hridayamuruki Nee Karayillenkil..." (Film: Karutha Pournami)
- "Innale Mayangumbol.." (Film: Anveshichu Kandethiyilla)
- "Kattile Pazhmulam.." (Film: Vilakku Vangiya Veena)
- "Alliyambal kadavil..." (Film: Rosi)
- "Anjanakkannezhuthi..." (Film: Thacholi Othenan)
- "Pranasakhi Nhan..." (Film: Pareeksha)
- "Karayunno Puzha Chirikkunno..." (Film: Murappennu)
- "Innenikku Pottu Kuthan..." (Film: Guruvayoor Kesavan)
- "Karimukilkkattile..." (Film: Kallichellamma)
- "Manjani Poonilavu..." (Film: Nagarame Nandi)
- "Pathuvelippinu......" (Film: Vengalam)
- "Dukhangalkkinnu Njaan..." (Film:Ambalapravu)
- "Vakacharthu..." (Film: Iruttinte Athmavu)
- "Swargagayike Ithile"... (Film: Mooladhanam)
- "Nilaavinte Poonkaavil"... (Film: Sree Krishnaparunth)
- "Innale Nee Oru Sundara Raagamayen... (film: Stree)
- "Iru Kanneer Thullikal Oru Sundariyude" (film" Iruttinte Atmavu)
- "Kesadi Padam Thozhnnen Kesava"... (film: "Pakalkkinavu")

== Filmography as director and producer ==
Feature Films

- Neelakkuyil (with Ramu Karyat) (1954)
- Rarichan Enna Pauran (1956)
- Nairu Pidicha Pulivalu (1958)
- Bhagya Jathakom (1962)
- Laila Majnu (1962)
- Ammaye Kaanaan (1963)
- Aadyakiranangal (1964)
- Shyamala Chechi (1965)
- Tharavattamma (1966)
- Anweshichu Kandethiyilla (1967)
- Iruttinte Athmavu (1967)
- Pareeksha (1967)
- Lakshaprabhu (1968)
- Aparadhini (1968)
- Manaswini (1968)
- Kaattukurangu (1969)
- Kallichellamma (1969)
- Mooladhanam (1969)
- Ambalapravu (1970)
- Kakkathamburatti (1970)
- Sthree (1970)
- Thurakkatha Vathil (1970)
- Kurukshethram (1970)
- Moonu Pookkal (1971)
- Muthassi (1971)
- Navavadhu (1971)
- Ummachu (1971)
- Vilakku Vangiya Veena (1971) (Producer & Director)
- Vithukal (1971)
- Aaradimanninte Janmi (1972) (Producer & Director)
- Sneehadeepame Mizhi Thurakku (1972)
- Raakuyil (1973) (Only as Producer)
- Udayam (1973) (Producer & Director)
- Veendum Prabhatham (1973)
- Arakkallan Mukkalkkallan (1974)
- Oru Pidi Ari (1974)
- Thacholi Marumakan Chandu (1974) (Producer & Director)
- Chumaduthangi (1975)
- Mattoru Seetha (1975)
- Appooppan (1976)
- Vazhivilakku (1976)
- Sreemad Bhagavad Geetha (1977) (Producer & Director)
- Jagadguru Aadisankaran (1977) (Producer & Director)
- Vilakkum Velichavum (1978)
- Enikku Vishakunnu (1983)

Documentaries

- Guruvayoor Mahatmyam (1984)
- History of Malayalam Cinema − 2 parts (1989)
- Vallathol (Year?)

Television

- Vaiki Vanna Vazhi (1990) (T. V. Film)
- Vaitharani (1991) (T.V. Serial)

== As an actor ==
- Ezhamkadalinakkare (1979)
- Pichipoo (1978)
- Manoradham (1978)
- Vilakkum Velichavum (1978)
- Neelakuyil (1954)
- Manasakshi (1954)
- Thiramala (1953)

== See also ==
- List of Malayalam films from 1951 to 1960
- List of Malayalam films from 1961 to 1970
- List of Malayalam films from 1971 to 1975
- List of Malayalam films from 1976 to 1980
- List of Malayalam films from 1981 to 1985
