= Philomina =

Indian actress (1926–2006)

- Born: 1926; Mullurkara, Malabar District, Madras Presidency, British India (present day Thrissur, Kerala, India)
- Died: 2 January 2006 (aged 79–80); Chennai, Tamil Nadu, India
- Occupation: Actor
- Years active: 1964–2003
- Spouse: Antony (m. 1956; died 1959)
- Children: 1
- Awards: Kerala State Film Awards; 1970, 1987 – Best Supporting Artiste (Thurakkathavaathil , Olavum Theeravum), (Thaniyavarthanam)

Philomina (1926 – 2 January 2006) was an Indian actress, who worked in the Malayalam film industry. She acted in more than 750 films in her career, mostly in character and comedy roles, besides playing a mother and grandmother. She started acting on the stage. This experience stood her in good stead when she was offered her first film role. The character of Anappara Achamma that she portrayed in the 1991 film Godfather is acknowledged to be one of the most powerful roles ever in Malayalam cinema.

== Early life ==
Philomina entered the film industry with eight years of experience in professional drama, she worked with the drama troupe of P. J. Antony. She used to say it that her initial experience with an actor like Antony helped shape her film career.

Her parents were perturbed when she had to travel to Chennai for the first shoot. It was Moidu Padiyathu who convinced her parents. Her first movie, Kuttikkuppayam (1964), produced by T. E. Vasudevan and directed by M. Krishnan Nair was a big hit. Philomina played the role of Prem Nazir's mother, a Muslim character.

== Personal life ==
She was born to Devassia and Mariam in 1926 at Mullurkara in Thrissur. She had her primary education from Valapad GVHS School.

Her father died when she was 12. She used to sing at church choir. When her father died she started singing for dramas to make a living. Later she started acting in dramas and then moved to movies.

She married Antony, a theater artist, in 1956, but lost her husband when her only son Joseph was three years old.

== Film career ==
Philomina won her first State award, for the best supporting actress, in 1970 for her roles in films Thurakkathavaathil and Olavum Theeravum. In 1987, she received the award for the second time for Thaniyavarthanam.

Somewhere during this time, there was a short break in her career. She came back in the films of Bharathan and Padmarajan. Her roles in films like Chatta, Innale, Njan Gandharvan, Venkalam, Churam, Vietnam Colony, Kudumbapuranam, Godfather, Uppukandam Brothers, Thalayana Manthram and Kakkothikkavile Appooppan Thaadikal would also be remembered for long time.

It was Sathyan Anthikkad who first cast Philomina in a comic role. The film Madanmaar Londonil, gave this talented actress a new image. Her roles in films like Malayogam, Kireedam, Uncle Bun, Manathe Kottaram, Vrudhanmare Sookshikkuka and In Harihar Nagar.

In a career spanning over four decades Philomina starred in 750 films and numerous television serials. She was last seen in Meerayude Dukhavum Muthuvinte Swapnavum.

== Later life ==
Philomina was living in a small, well done-up apartment in Kochi till she moved to her son's place in Chennai a couple of years before her death. She was a chronic diabetic and suffered stroke in 2005. She was getting insulin shots for her diabetic condition. She was bed-ridden for over a month before she died at her son- Joseph's residence in Chennai due to diabetes related problems on 2 January 2006, aged 79.

== Awards ==
Kerala State Film Awards:

- Second Best Actress – 1970 – Thurakkatha Vathil, Olavum Theeravum
- Second Best Actress – 1987 – Thaniyavarthanam

Kerala Film Critics Award:

- Best Second Actress - 1991 - Godfather

== Filmography ==
=== 1960s ===
Year	Title	Role	Notes
1964	Kuttikkuppayam	Kunjipathumma	
1964	Kalyana Photo	Chechamma	
1964	Ore Bhoomi Ore Raktham		
1964	Aadyakiranangal	Annamma	
1965	Thankakudam	Kunjaathumma	
1965	Chemmeen		
1965	Subaidha	Raziya	
1965	Kattupookkal	Thaiyamma	
1966	Kalithozhan	Venu's mother	
1966	Pattuthoovaala	Maali	
1966	Anarkali	Anarkali's mother	
1966	Kalyanarathriyil	Madhaviyamma	
1966	Thilothama	Vasundhara	
1966	Manikyakottaram		
1967	Iruttinte Athmavu	Meenakshiyamma	

=== 1970s ===
Year	Title	Role	Notes
1970	Ambalapravu	Kamalam	
1970	Sthree	Dakshayani	
1970	Priya		
1970	Palunku Pathram		
1970	Olavum Theeravum	Nabisa's mother	
1970	Aranazhika Neram	Saramma	
1970	Abhayam	Sr. Briggitte	
1970	Vazhve Mayam	Parukutty	
1970	Thurakkatha Vathil	Beevathumma	
1971	Thapaswini		
1971	Ummachu		
1971	Navavadhu	Bharathi	
1971	Thettu	Eali	
1971	Aabhijathyam	Kunjannamma	
1971	Anubhavangal Paalichakal	Parvathi's Mother	
1971	Sindooracheppu	Pithachu	
1971	Inqulab Zindabbad	Narayani	
1971	Kuttyedathi	Narayani	
1971	Muthassi	Madhavikutty	
1971	Makane Ninakku Vendi	Achamma	
1971	Marunnattil Oru Malayali	Kariachan's wife	
1972	Devi		
1972	Pulliman		
1972	Oru Kanyasthriyude Katha		
1972	Sathi		
1972	Sakthi		
1972	Preethi		
1972	Postmane Kananilla		
1972	Manthrakodi	Grandmother	
1972	Omana	Eliyamma Koshi	
1972	Snehadeepame Mizhi Thurakku	Savithri Antharjanam	
1972	Theerthayathra	Neighbour's mother	
1972	Aaradimanninte Janmi	Vishalakshi Amma	
1972	Iniyoru Janmam Tharu	Kunjithalla	
1972	Lakshyam	Umma	
1972	Achanum Bappayum	Fathima	
1972	Vidhyarthikale Ithile Ithile		
1973	Police Ariyaruthe	Witness	
1973	Dharmayudham	Narayani	
1973	Raakuyil	Kunjamma	
1973	Achani	Mariamma	
1973	Panitheeratha Veedu	Jose's mother	
1973	Kaliyugam	Janu's mother	
1973	Udayam	Ikkavamma	
1973	Maram	Ayisha	
1973	Aaradhika	Paaruammayi	
1973	Bhadradeepam	Rajani's Mother	
1973	Ladies Hostel	Annamma	
1973	Kaapalika	Eali	
1973	Padmavyooham	Raheal	
1974	Mister Sundari		
1974	Nagaram Sagaram		
1974	Rahasyarathri	Gouri	
1974	Thacholi Marumakan Chandu	Nanga	
1974	Arakkallan Mukkalkkallan	Valli	
1974	College Girl	Prof. Parukuttiyamma	
1974	Chattakkari	Aunty	
1974	Poonthenaruvi	Achaamma	
1975	Sathyathinte Nizhalil		
1975	Palazhi Madanam		
1975	Pulivalu		
1975	Aranya Kandam		
1975	Thaamarathoni		
1975	Ayodhya		
1975	Chattambikkalyaani	Pathumma Beegam	
1975	Thiruvonam	Servant	
1976	Themmadi Velappan	Aliyar's umma	
1977	Sneha Yamuna		
1977	Mohavum Mukthiyum		
1977	Varadakshina		
1977	Sneham		
1977	Chathurvedam	Madhavi	
1977	Nirakudam	Naniyamma	
1977	Yatheem	Amina	
1977	Sankhupushpam	Naaniyamma	
1977	Hridayame Sakshi	Narayanan's mother	
1978	Seemanthini		
1978	Lisa	Deviyamma	
1978	Jayikkaanaay Janichavan	Kalyani's aunt	
1978	Ithaanente Vazhi	Beevi Umma	
1978	Ee Manohara Theeram	Amminiyamma	
1978	Kudumbam Namukku Sreekovil	Lakshmiyamma	
1978	Padmatheertham	Amina	
1978	Vayanadan Thamban	Annamma's mother	
1979	Kallu Karthyayani		
1979	Aval Niraparadhi		
1979	Mani Koya Kurup		
1979	Sugathinu Pinnale	Parvathi	
1979	Pambaram	Thankamma	
1979	Kazhukan	Pimp Vasu's wife	
1979	Puthiya Velicham	Althara Amma	

=== 1980s ===
Year	Title	Role	Notes
1980	Oormakale Vida Tharu		
1980	Naayattu	Pathumma	
1980	Pavizha Mutthu	Kaaliyamma	
1981	Anyar		
1981	Chaatta	Velu's mother	
1981	Abhinayam	Bharghavi	
1983	Sandhya Mayangum Neram	Achankunju's mother	
1983	Aa Raathri	Abdu's mother	
1983	Mandanmar Londonil	Narayani	
1983	Sandhya Vandanam	Paru Amma	
1983	Naseema	Naseema's mother	
1983	Pallamkuzhi	Saradha	
1983	Mansoru Maha Samudram	Renuka's mother	
1984	Pyasa Shaitan		
1984	Manasariyathe	Sankaran's mother	
1984	Ivide Ingane	Raju's mother	
1984	Mangalam Nerunnu	Meenakshiyamma	
1984	Unaroo	Mamma	
1984	Ethirppukal	Bharathiyamma	
1984	NH 47	Sudhakaran's mother	
1985	Manya Mahajanangale	Ayisha	
1985	Njan Piranna Nattil	Naaniyamma	
1985	Janakeeya Kodathi	Gopi's mother	
1985	Ambada Njaane!	Devayani's grandmother	
1985	Ee Lokam Evide Kure Manushyar	Rosi	
1985	Vellarikka Pattanam	Sofiya's aunt	
1985	Kathodu Kathoram	Old woman	
1986	Chekkeranoru Chilla	Paru	
1986	Ice Cream	Mother	
1986	Rareeram	Sister	
1986	Arappatta Kettiya Gramathil	Gourikutti's mother	
1987	Yagagni		
1987	Thaniyavarthanam	Balan's grandmother	
1988	Sangham	Rappayi's wife	
1988	Dhinarathrangal	Aravindan's mother	
1988	Kakkothikkavile Appooppan Thaadikal	Old beggar lady	
1988	Kudumbapuranam	Kunjamma	
1988	Ponmuttayidunna Tharavu	Bhaskaran's mother	
1988	Oru Muthassi Katha	Unnili Muthassi	
1988	Pattanapravesham	Prabhakaran Thampi's mother	
1989	Jaithra Yathra	Sister	
1989	Mahayanam	Janamma	
1989	Artham	House Owner	
1989	Innale	Rahelamma	
1989	Mazhavilkavadi	Velayudhankutty's grandmother	
1989	Oru Sayahnathinte Swapnam	Inmate of the old age home	
1989	Peruvannapurathe Visheshangal	Matriarch of Kavumpattu	
1989	Pradeshika Varthakal	Naniyammma	
1989	Kireedam	Muthassi	
1989	Ulsavapittennu	Muthassi	

=== 1990s ===
Year	Title	Role	Notes
1990	Thalayana Manthram	Paruammayi	
1990	Sankarankuttikku Pennu Venam		
1990	Chodyam		
1990	Champion Thomas		
1990	Purappadu		
1990	Innale	Rahelamma	
1990	Ee Thanutha Veluppan Kalathu	Swamini	
1990	Kalikkalam	Janakiyamma	
1990	Dr. Pasupathy	Kunjulakshmi	
1990	Gajakesariyogam	Philipose's mother	
1990	In Harihar Nagar	Maya's grandmother	
1990	Kouthuka Varthakal	Rosemary's grandmother	
1990	Malayogom	Mary	
1990	Orukkam	Paramu's mother	
1990	Sasneham	Eenashu's mother	
1990	Kshanakkathu	Maid	
1990	Pavakkoothu	Nurse	
1990	Vidhyarambam	Madhavi	
1991	Aakasha Kottayile Sultan	Pappy's Sister	
1991	Innathe Program	Bhargavikutty Amma	
1991	Mimics Parade	Thandamma	
1991	Ezhunnallathu	House owner	
1991	Kankettu	Sridevi's grandmother	
1991	Kalari	Janaki Valiyamma	
1991	Amina Tailors	Khadeeja	
1991	God Father	Anappara Achamma	
1991	Mookilla Rajyathu	Insane Lady	
1991	Sundhari Kakka	Mariya	
1991	Njan Gandharvan	Bhama's grandmother	
1991	Parallel College	Rahelamma	
1991	Pookkalam Varavayi	Akkamma	
1991	Souhrudam	Kathrina	
1991	Ulladakkam	Hospital Attendant	
1991	Uncle Bun	Gloria Therathi	
1991	Ennum Nanmakal	Dr. Aniruddan's mother	
1992	Vaalkkandi		
1992	Vietnam Colony	Suhra Bai	
1992	Kasargod Khader Bhai	Thandamma	
1992	Ente Ponnu Thampuran	Meerabhai	
1992	Kunukkitta Kozhi	Indu's grandmother	
1992	My Dear Muthachan	Kunjamma	
1992	Oru Kochu Bhoomikulukkam	Ravi's grandmother	
1992	Ponnaram Thottathe Rajavu	Nani Thalla	
1992	Snehasagaram	Josekutty's mother	
1992	Neelakurukkan	Kunjanamma	
1992	Congratulations Miss Anitha Menon	Kalyaniyamma	
1993	Sthreedhanam	Vanaja's grandmother	
1993	Vardhakya Puranam	Odanavattom Omana	
1993	Kulapathy	Vellachi	
1993	Koushalam	Mariya	
1993	Bhaagyavaan	Janu	
1993	Pravachakan	Baalu's grandmother	
1993	Venkalam	Grandmother	
1993	O' Faby	Mary	
1993	Uppukandam Brothers	Kunjanamma	
1993	Chenkol	Muthassi	Archive footage from Kireedam
1994	Kadalkkaakka		
1994	Vrudhanmare Sookshikkuka	Margerett	
1994	Bharya	Hari's grandmother	
1994	Kadal	Martha	
1994	Manathe Kottaram	Dilip's mother	
1994	Vardhakya Puranam	Othanaavattam Omana	
1994	Chakoram	Amminiyamma	
1994	Kambolam	Alphonsa	
1994	Nandini Oppol	Amminikutty Amma	
1994	Moonnam Loka Pattalam	Muthassi	
1994	Pidakkozhi Koovunna Noottandu	Mariamma	
1995	Avittam Thirunaal Aarogya Sriman	Kousalya's mother	
1995	Keerthanam	Ammachi	
1995	Thumboli Kadappuram	Chanchamma	
1995	Kalyanji Anandji	Chettathi	
1995	Samudhayam	Annamma	
1995	Kusruthikaatu	Treesa's mother in law	
1996	Aramana Veedum Anjoorekkarum	Rajappan's mother	
1996	Kavadam		
1996	April 19	Jayaprakash's relative	
1996	Aayiram Naavulla Ananthan		
1996	Excuse Me Ehtu Collegilla	Mariamma	
1996	Kireedamillatha Rajakkanmaar	Saramma	
1996	Malayaalamaasam Chingam Onninu	Aunty	
1996	Vanarasena	Narayani	
1997	Manthra Mothiram	Jose's mother	
1997	Churam	Thalla	
1997	Vamsam	Rahel	
1997	Adukkala Rahasyam Angaadi Paattu	Jose's grandmother	
1998	Achaammakkuttiyude Achaayan	Anthony's mother	
1998	Kusruthi Kuruppu	Noorjahan's umma	
1998	Amma Ammaayiyamma	Narayani Amma	
1999	Mimics Ghost		
1999	James Bond	Aliammachedathi	
1999	American Ammayi	Nani Amma	
1999	Charlie Chaplin	House owner aunty	
1999	Bharya Veettil Paramasukham	Bhargavi	

=== 2000s ===
Year	Film	Role	Notes
2000	Mister Butler	Radhika's grandmother	
2000	The Warrant		
2000	Ee Mazha Then Mazha	Rekha's grandmother	
2000	Rapid Action Force		
2000	Anamuttathe Aangalamar	Dakshayiniyamma	
2001	The Gift of God		
2001	Onnam Ragam	Jackson's mother	
2001	Ladies and Gentlemen	Bar owner	
2001	Korappan The Great	American Achayathi	
2002	Grandmother		
2003	Meerayude Dukhavum Muthuvinte Swapnavum	Muthu's Grandmother	
2004	The Journey		
2007	Raakilipattu		Cameo
2008	Twenty:20		Cameo (Archive footage)
2009	2 Harihar Nagar	Maya's grandmother	Archive footage
2010	Again Kasargod Khader Bhai	Thandamma	Archive footage
2011	Uppukandam Brothers: Back in Action	Kunjannamma	Archive footage
2014	Tharangal	Herself	Photo only

== TV Serial ==
- Sthree
- Janakaeeyam Janaki
- Shankupushpam
- Thamarakkuzhali
- Punnakka Vikasana Corporation
- Kudumba Visheyshangal

== Drama ==
- Pooja
- Sagara Rajakumari - radio drama

== As a singer ==
- Achamakuttiyude Achayan 1998
- "Kunjiyammakku Anchu Makkalane" (Adukkala Rahasyam Angadi Paattu) 1997
- "Muthani Munthiri" (Pookkalam Varavayi) 1991
