= Parappurath =

Indian writer (1924–1981)

K. E. Mathai (Parappurath)
- Born: 14 November 1924; Mavelikkara, Kerala
- Died: 30 December 1981 (aged 57)
- Occupations: Novelist, short story writer, screenwriter
- Spouse: Ammini
- Children: 3 sons and 2 daughters
- Relatives: Kunjunaina Easo (father); Sosamma (mother)
- Writing career
- Genres: Novel, short Story, screenplays
- Notable work: Ara Nazhika Neram
- Notable awards: 1965 Sahithya Pravarthaka Sahakarana Sangham Award; 1966 Kerala Sahitya Akademi Award for Story; 1968 Kerala Sahitya Akademi Award for Novel; 1970 Kerala State Film Award for Best Story; 1972 Kerala State Film Award for Best Story; M. P. Paul Prize

Kizhakkepainummoodu Easo Mathai, better known by his pen name Parappurath (1924–1981), was an Indian novelist, short story writer and screenwriter who wrote in the Malayalam language. His body of work comprises 20 novels, 14 short story anthologies and 15 screenplays. He was a recipient of the Kerala Sahitya Akademi Award for Story (1966), Kerala Sahitya Akademi Award for Novel (1968) and Kerala State Film Award for Best Story (twice 1970 and 1972), amongst other honours.

== Biography ==
K. E. Mathai was born on 14 November 1924 in Kunnam, a small village near Mavelikkara in Alappuzha district of the south Indian state of Kerala to Kizhakkepainummoottil Kunjunaina Easo and Sosamma. His early schooling was at the local primary school in Kunnam and later, he joined Chettikulangara High School but he could not complete his education as his father died in 1939, leaving Mathai to take over the responsibility of the family. Subsequently, he joined the Indian Army in 1944 as a havildar in Pioneer Corps. He served the army for 21 years before superannuating from service in 1965. On his return to Kerala, he founded Saritha Press, in Mavelikkara.

Mathai was married to Ammini, the marriage taking place in 1952. He died on 30 December 1981, at the age of 57.

== Legacy ==
Parappurath, who earned the moniker "story teller of Onattukara" after his birthplace, wrote 20 novels and 14 short story anthologies; his 21st novel, Kaanaapponnu, was incomplete at the time of his death and was later completed by K. Surendran. His multiple award-winning novel, Ara Nazhika Neram, was later adapted as a movie under the same name. Six of his other novels (Omana, Panitheeraatha Veedu, Ninamaninja Kaalppaadukal, Aadyakiranangal, Makane Ninakku Vendi and Anweshichu Kandethiyilla) were also made into films. He also wrote a play, Velicham Kuranja Vazhikal and a memoirs, Marikkatha Ormmakal.

Parappurath was involved with literary organizations such as the Sahithya Pravarthaka Co-operative Society (SPCS), where he sat on the Board of Directors from 1974 to 1977, and again from 1980; in 1981, he was elected as its president, a position he held at the time of his death. His film career covered 15 screenplays, of which 14 were based on his own stories. Altogether, he wrote dialogues for 19 films and acted a small part in Aranazhika Neram.

== Awards and honours ==
Parappurath received the Sahithya Pravarthaka Sahakarana Sangham Award for his work, Naalalu Naaluvazhi in 1965. When Kerala Sahitya Akademi instituted an annual award for the best short story in 1966, his Naalalu Naaluvazhi was again selected for the inaugural award. Two years later, Akademi honoured him again with the Kerala Sahitya Akademi Award for Novel in 1968, Ara Nazhika Neram earning him the award. He received the Kerala State Film Award for Best Story twice, in 1970 for Aranazhika Neram and in 1972, for Panitheeratha Veedu. He was also a recipient of the M. P. Paul Literary Prize.

== Bibliography ==
=== Novels ===
- Parappurath (1967). Ara Nazhika Neram (in Malayalam).
- Parappurath (2006). Manassukondu Oru Madakkayathra.
- Parappurath (1998). Anweshichu, Kandethiyilla (in Malayalam).
- Parappurath (1988). Ninamaninja Kalpadukal.
- Parappurath (1982). Marikkatha Ormmakal (in Malayalam).
- Parappurath (1978). Avasthantharam / (in Malayalam).
- Parappurath (1979). Panitheeratha Veedu (in Malayalam).
- Parappurath (1979). Ivane Njan Ariyunnilla / (in Malayalam).
- Parappurath (1981). Akasathile Paravakal.
- Parappurath (1982). Dharmasankadam/.
- Parappurath; K. Surendran (1982). Kanapponnu (in Malayalam).
- Parappurath (1971). Thenvarikka (in Malayalam).
- Parappurath (1972). Vazhiyabalam (in Malayalam).
- Parappurath (1972). Aadyakiranagal (in Malayalam).
- Parappurath (1972). Nanmayude Pookal (in Malayalam).
- Parappurath (1974). Prayanam (in Malayalam).
- Parappurath (1975). Achante Kamuki (in Malayalam).
- Parappurath (1976). Omana (in Malayalam).
- Parappurath (1969). Chandha (in Malayalam).
- Parappurath. Makane Ninakkuvendi (in Malayalam). DC Books.
- Parappurattu (1980). Vilakkukal Vilangukal.

=== Short stories ===
- Parappurath (1968). Theranjedutha Kathakal (in Malayalam).
- Parappurath (1968). Aa Poomottu Virinjilla (in Malayalam).
- Parappurath. Jeevithathinte Aalbathilninnu (in Malayalam).
- Parappurath (1961). Thokkum Thoolikayum (in Malayalam).
- Parappurath (1966). Dinandhyakkurippukal (in Malayalam).
- Parappurath (1967). Kurukkan Keevareethu Marichu (in Malayalam).
- Parappurath (1968). Susanna (in Malayalam).
- Parappurath (1960). Orammayum Moonnu Penmakkalum. Kottayam: N B S.
- Parappurath (1965). Nalaal Naalu Vazhi. KOTTAYAM: NBS.
- Parappurath. Kochechiyude Kalyanam.
- Parappurath. Vazhiyariyathe.
- Parappurath. Prakasadhara.
- Parappurath. Keezhadangal.
- Parappurath. Aliyan.
- 101 Kutty kathhakal (in Malayalam). 1981.

=== Play ===
- Parappurath (1968). Velicham Kuranja Vazhikal (in Malayalam).

=== Memoirs ===
- Parappurath. Marikkatha Ormmakal.

=== Translations ===
- Parappurathu (1981). House unfinished. Translated by Tharakan, K. M. Thrissur: Kerala Sahitya Academy.
- Parappurath (2014). A Half Hour's Time. Translated by K. P. Joseph. Avanty Publishers.

== Movies ==
=== Screenplay ===
- Ninamaninja Kalpadukal (1963)
- Anweshichu Kandethiyilla (1967)
- Manaswini (1968)
- Aparaadhini (1968)
- Anadha (1970)
- Sthree (1970)
- Karinizhal (1971)
- Makane Ninakku Vendi (1971)
- Iniyoru Janmam Tharoo (1972)
- Akkarappacha (1972)
- Omana (1972)
- Panitheeraatha Veedu (1973)
- Thottavadi (1973)
- Ee Manoharatheeram (1978)

=== Story ===
- Ninamaninja Kalpadukal (1963)
- Aadyakiranangal (1964)
- Anweshichu Kandethiyilla (1967)
- Manaswini (1968)
- Anadha (1970)
- Aranazhika Neram (1970)
- Makane Ninakku Vendi (1971)
- Akkarappacha (1972)
- Omana (1972)
- Panitheeraatha Veedu (1973)
- Thottavadi (1973)
- Ee Manoharatheeram (1978)

=== Dialogue ===
- Ninamaninja Kalpadukal (1963)
- Tharavattamma (1966)
- Anweshichu Kandethiyilla (1967)
- Manaswini (1968)
- Aparaadhini (1968)
- Anadha (1970)
- Moodalmanju (1970)
- Aranazhika Neram (1970)
- Sthree (1970)
- Karinizhal (1971)
- Makane Ninakku Vendi (1971)
- Iniyoru Janmam Tharoo (1972)
- Akkarappacha (1972)
- Omana (1972)
- Panitheeraatha Veedu (1973)
- Thottavadi (1973)
- Makkal (1975)
- Ee Manoharatheeram (1978)

=== Acting ===
- Aranaazhikaneram (1970).... Chacko
