= Jakkamma (film) =

1972 film by M. Karnan

- Poster
- Directed by: M. Karnan
- Screenplay by: M. Karnan
- Story by: Vijaya Chitra Films Unit
- Starring: Jaishankar; Savitri; S. A. Ashokan
- Cinematography: M. Karnan
- Edited by: R. Devarajan
- Music by: S. M. Subbaiah Naidu
- Production company: Vijaya Chitra Films
- Distributed by: Sri Navaneetha Films
- Release date: 14 September 1972
- Running time: 146 minutes
- Country: India
- Language: Tamil

Jakkamma is a 1972 Indian Tamil-language Western film directed and filmed by M. Karnan. The film stars Jaishankar, Savitri and S. A. Ashokan. It was released on 14 September 1972.

== Plot ==
Jakkamma and Ponnambalam, a married couple, live happily with their two sons — Babu and Raja — in a village. The village is constantly raided by a notorious robber Kali and his gang. In trying to save the village and its people, Ponnambalam is murdered by Kali. Jakkama raises both her sons valiantly and teaches them to fight against injustice. Jakkama is abducted by Kali and kept captive as a prisoner. Babu and Raja befriend Jambu, a friend and sympathiser of the poor and with his help, they rescue their mother. Kali comes to challenge Jambu but gets into the trap and Jakkamma kills Kali, and the whole village is freed.

== Cast ==
- Jaishankar as Jambu
- Savitri as Jakkamma
- Usharani
- S. A. Ashokan as Kali
- C. L. Anandan
- K. Kannan
- Thengai Srinivasan
- Manorama as Veeramma
- S. V. Subbaiah
- V. Nagayya
- Karuppu Subbiah
- Usilai Mani
- Haalam

== Production ==
Jakkamma was directed by M. Karnan who also handled the cinematography and wrote the screenplay. The film was produced by Vijaya Chitra Films, and the story was written by the Vijaya Chitra Films Unit, while the dialogues were written by Aaroor Dass. Editing was handled by R. Devarajan. The film was prominently shot in the village Kannankottai. Its final length of the film was 3,990.13 metres (13,091.0 ft).

== Themes ==
Film historian Swarnavel Eswaran compared Jakkamma to Karnan's other Western films like Kalam Vellum, Ganga and Enga Pattan Sothu because of their mutual theme being the protagonist seeking revenge for a murdered family member. He compared the title character to Sita from the Ramayana for "suffering alone with her two kids", and Draupadi from the Mahabharata for "vowing not to tie her hair till her husband's death is avenged".

== Soundtrack ==
The soundtrack was composed by S. M. Subbaiah Naidu. The songs featured in the film were "Kollimalai Saralamma", "Kadavulin Padaippe", "Music Dance" and "Jakkamma".

== Release and reception ==
Jakkamma was released on 14 September 1972, and distributed by Sri Navaneetha Films in Madras.

== Bibliography ==
- Pillai, Swarnavel Eswaran (24 April 2015). "Tamil B Movie Westerns: The Global South and Genre Subversion". The Western in the Global South. Routledge. ISBN 978-1-315-73113-1.
