= Kerala State Film Award for Best Story =

Annual Indian film award

- State award for contributions to Malayalam cinema
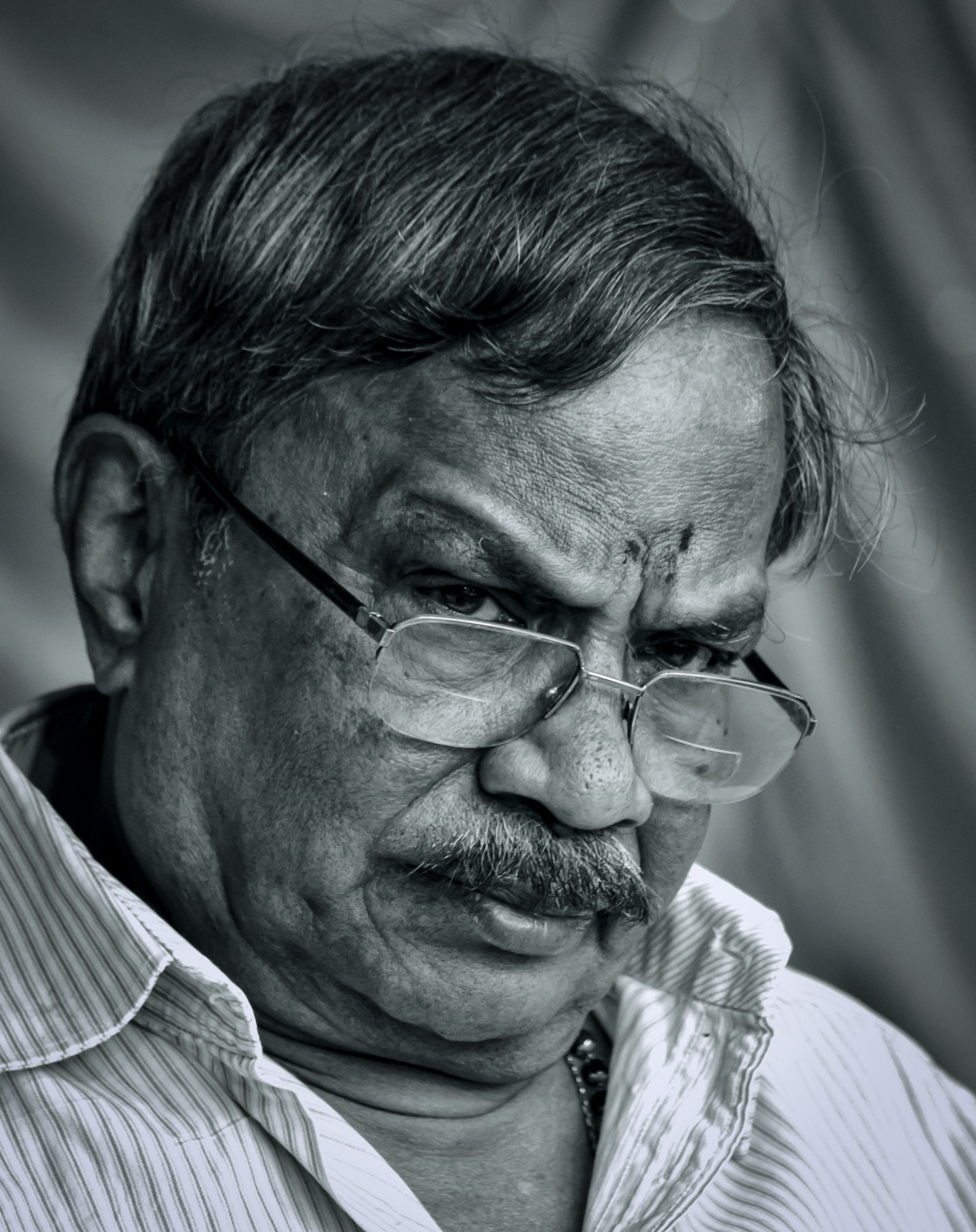
- M. T. Vasudevan Nair has won the award 3 times, making him the most frequent winner of the award along with T. A. Razzaq
- Awarded for: Best Story in a Malayalam film
- Sponsored by: Kerala State Chalachitra Academy
- Reward: ₹50,000 (US$530)
- First award: 1969
- Final award: 2024
- Most recent winner: Prasanna Vithanage

Highlights
- Total awarded: 55
- First winner: Thoppil Bhasi
- Last winner: Adarsh Sukumaran, Paulson Skaria
- Website: keralafilm.com

The Kerala State Film Award for Best Story, instituted in 1969, is presented annually at the Kerala State Film Award of India to a writer for the best story in a Malayalam film. Until 1997, the awards were managed directly by the Department of Cultural Affairs of the Government of Kerala. Since 1998, the awards have been constituted by the Kerala State Chalachitra Academy, an autonomous, non-profit institution functioning under the Department of Cultural Affairs. The awardees are decided by an independent jury constituted every year. They are announced by the Minister for Cultural Affairs and are presented by the Chief Minister.

Throughout the years, accounting for ties and repeat winners, the Government of Kerala has presented a total of 51 Best Story awards to 44 different writers. The recipients receive a figurine, a certificate, and a cash prize of ₹50,000 (US$530). As of 2020, the only writer to have won the prize in consecutive years is Padmarajan, in 1978 and 1979.

== Winners ==
Year	Story writer	Film	Director
1969	Thoppil Bhasi	Mooladhanam	P.Bhaskaran
1970	Parappurath	Ara Nazhika Neram	K. S. Sethumadhavan
1971	Uroob	Ummachu	P. Bhaskaran
1972	Parappurath	Panitheeratha Veedu	K.S.Sethumadhavan
1973	Vaikom Chandrasekharan Nair	Madhavikkutty	Thoppil Bhasi
1974	Pamman	Chattakari	K. S. Sethumadhavan
1975	K. B. Sreedevi	Niramaala	P. Ramdas
1976	No award		
1977	No award		
1978	No award		
1979	Balachandra Menon	Uthrada Rathri	Balachandra Menon
1979	Padmarajan	Peruvazhiyambalam	Padmarajan
1980	Perumbadavam Sreedharan	Surya Daham	Mohan
1981	M. Sukumaran	Sheshakriya	Ravi Alumoodu
1982	Vijayan Karottu	Marmaram	Bharathan
1983	M. T. Vasudevan Nair	Aaroodam	I. V. Sasi
1984	Thikkodiyan	Ithirippove Chuvannapoove	Bharathan
1985	M. T. Vasudevan Nair, KG George	Anubandham, Irakal	I. V. Sasi, KG George
1986	Sathyan Anthikkad	T. P. Balagopalan M.A.	Sathyan Anthikkad
1987	A. K. Lohithadas	Thaniyavarthanam	Sibi Malayil
1988	Madhavikutty	Rugmini	K. P. Kumaran
1989	Vaikom Muhammad Basheer	Mathilukal	Adoor Gopalakrishnan
1990	C. V. Sreeraman	Vasthuhara	G. Aravindan
1991	Sreenivasan	Sandesham	Sathyan Anthikad
1992	M. Mukundan	Daivathinte Vikrithikal	Lenin Rajendran
1993	Zacharia	Vidheyan	Adoor Gopalakrishnan
1994	M. T. Vasudevan Nair	Sukrutham	Harikumar
1995	M. Sukumaran	Kazhakam	M.P.Sukumaran Nair
1996	T. A. Razzaq	Kanakkinavu	Sibi Malayil
1997	Sethu	Poothiruvathira Raavil	V.R.Gopinath
1998	P. T. Kunju Muhammed	Garshom	P. T. Kunju Muhammed
1999	P. Balachandran	Punaradhivasam	V. K. Prakash
2000	R. Sarath	Sayahnam	R. Sarath
2001	T. K. Rajeev Kumar	Sesham	T. K. Rajeev Kumar
2002	T. A. Razzaq	Aayirathil Oruvan	Sibi Malayil
2003	Aryadan Shoukath	Paadam Onnu: Oru Vilapam	T. V. Chandran
2004	T. A. Razzaq	Perumazhakkalam	Kamal
2005	Aryadan Shoukath	Daivanamathil	Jayaraj
2006	James Albert	Classmates	Lal Jose
2007	P. T. Kunju Muhammed	Paradesi	Himself
2008	Aryadan Shoukath	Vilapangalkappuram	T. V. Chandran
2009	Sashi Paravoor	Kadaksham	Himself
2010	Mohan Sharma	Gramam	Himself
2011	M. Mohanan	Manikya Kallu	Himself
2012	Manoj Kana	Chayilyam	Manoj Kana
2013	Aneesh Anwar	Zachariayude Garbhinikal	Aneesh Anwar
2014	Sidhartha Siva	Ain	Sidhartha Siva
2015	Hari Kumar	Kaattum Mazhayum	Hari Kumar
2016	Salim Kumar	Karutha Joothan	Salim Kumar
2017	M. A. Nishad	Kinar	M. A. Nishad
2018	Joy Mathew	Uncle	Girish Damodar
2019	Shahul Aliyar	Vasanthi	Rahman Brothers
2020	Senna Hegde	Thinkalazhcha Nishchayam	Senna Hegde
2021	Shahi Kabir	Nayattu	Martin Prakkat
2022	Kamal K. M.	Pada	Kamal KSkariah
2023	Adarsh Sukumaran, Paulson Skaria	Kaathal - The Core	Jeo Baby
2024	Prasanna Vithanage	Paradise	
