= Anweshichu Kandethiyilla =

- Poster
- Directed by: P. Bhaskaran
- Written by: Parappurath
- Based on: Anweshichu Kandethiyilla by Parappurath
- Produced by: K. Ravindran Nair
- Starring: K. R. Vijaya; Sathyan; Madhu; Sukumari; Kaviyoor Ponnamma
- Cinematography: E. N. Balakrishnan
- Edited by: Das; G. Venkittaraman
- Music by: M. S. Baburaj
- Production company: General Pictures
- Release date: 8 September 1967
- Country: India
- Language: Malayalam

Anweshichu Kandethiyilla (transl. Sought But Didn’t Find) is a 1967 Indian Malayalam-language film, directed by P. Bhaskaran and written by Parappurath. The film stars K. R. Vijaya, Sathyan and Madhu. Based on Parappurath's novel of the same name, it recounts the quest for happiness by a nurse with the best of intentions, but she is disillusioned. Conceived as a direct, tragic counter-argument to the biblical homily, ‘seek and ye shall find’, Anweshichu Kandethiyilla won the National Film Award for Best Feature Film in Malayalam.

== Cast ==
- Sathyan as Thomas
- K. R. Vijaya as Susamma
- Madhu as Antony
- Sukumari as Savithri
- Kaviyoor Ponnamma as Annie's mother
- Adoor Bhasi as Korappachayan
- Thikkurissy Sukumaran Nair as Ummachan
- Kottayam Santha as Cheriyamma
- P. J. Antony as Unnunnichayan
- T. S. Muthaiah as Tharakan
- Bahadoor as Vaidyar
- G. K. Pillai as Thommachan
- Mavelikkara Ponnamma
- Aranmula Ponnamma
- Meena as Annamma
- Nellikode Bhaskaran as Kunju Krishnan Nambiar
- Panjabi as Cheriyachan
- Santha Devi
- Junior Sheela as Karthi
- Vijayanirmala as Annie
- Sathyan as Thomas

== Soundtrack ==
The music was composed by M. S. Baburaj, with lyrics by P. Bhaskaran.

No.	Title	Singer(s)	Length
1.	"Innale Mayangumbol"	K. J. Yesudas
2.	"Kavilathe Kanneer Kandu"	S. Janaki
3.	"Murivaalan Kurangachan"	S. Janaki
4.	"Pavananaam Aattidaya"	S. Janaki, B. Vasantha
5.	"Thaamarakkumbilallo"	S. Janaki
