= K. P. Pillai =

Malayalam film director (died 2021)

K. P. Pillai (1929/30 – 31 August 2021) was an Indian Malayali film director who worked mainly in Malayalam films. He made his film debut as an assistant director in Ramu Kariat's film Abhayam in 1970. He directed Nagaram Sagaram, Vrindavan (1975), Ashtamudikkayal (1977), Kathir Mandapam (1978), Pathira Sooryan (1980) and Priyasakhi Radha (1981).

== Life ==
K. P. Pillai was the son of Prameswaran Pillai and Devaki Amma. After the completion of education in Varkala Sivagiri, University College he served in Indian Airforce for 21 years.

He died on 31 August 2021 in Thiruvananthapuram at the age of 91.

== Filmography ==
- Nagaram Sagaram
- Vrindavan (1975)
- Ashtamudikkayal (1977)
- Kathir Mandapam (1978)
- Pathira Sooryan (1980)
- Priyasakhi Radha

As assistant director

- Abhayam
- Priya (1971)
- Mayiladum Kunnu
- Inquilab Zindabad
- Panitheeratha Veedu
- Adhyathe Kadha
