= Enga Pattan Sothu =

1975 film

- Theatrical release poster
- Directed by: M. Karnan
- Screenplay by: M. Karnan
- Story by: Vijaychitra Films Unit
- Produced by: M. Karnan
- Starring: Jaishankar; Sivakumar; Rajakokila
- Cinematography: M. Karnan
- Edited by: R. Devarajan
- Music by: Shankar–Ganesh
- Production company: Vijaychitra Films
- Release date: 24 January 1975
- Country: India
- Language: Tamil

Enga Pattan Sothu (transl. My inheritance) is a 1975 Indian Tamil-language Western film produced, written, directed and photographed by M. Karnan. The film stars Jaishankar, Sivakumar and Rajakokila. It was released on 24 January 1975, and emerged a commercial success.

== Cast ==
- Jaishankar
- Sivakumar
- Rajakokila
- S. A. Ashokan
- Thengai Srinivasan
- A. Karunanidhi
- Master Raghuraman
- A. Sakunthala
- Raj Mallika

== Production ==
Enga Pattan Sothu is the fourth and final Western film directed by Karnan. Unlike the earlier three (Kalam Vellum, Ganga and Jakkamma) which were in black-and-white, it was shot in Eastman Color Negative. An emotional scene featuring Jaishankar was shot at Saradha Studios. A scene was shot at Narmada River at Bhedaghat, Madhya Pradesh. The song "Aathu Meenu" was shot at Pahalgam, Kashmir. Some scenes were shot at Hogenakkal.

== Themes ==
Critic Swarnavel Eswaran Pillai compared Enga Pattan Sothu to Karnan's previous Western films for the narrative being fuelled by the death of a family member of the protagonist. R. C. Jayanthan, writing for Hindu Tamil Thisai, noted the film's similarities to those made by Sergio Leone.

== Soundtrack ==
The soundtrack was composed by Shankar–Ganesh, with lyrics by Kannadasan.

Track listing
No.	Title	Singer(s)	Length
1.	"Aatha Meenu Karaiyil Yeruthu"	T. M. Soundararajan, L. R. Eswari
2.	"Madhuvile Pazhaiyathu"	Vani Jairam
3.	"Podu Noothukku Nooru"	Vani Jairam, Kovai Soundararajan

== Release and reception ==
Enga Pattan Sothu was released on 24 January 1975. Ananda Vikatan applauded Karnan's cinematography and the stunts but criticised the story.

== Bibliography ==
- Pillai, Swarnavel Eswaran (24 April 2015). "Tamil B Movie Westerns: The Global South and Genre Subversion". The Western in the Global South. Routledge. ISBN 978-1-315-73113-1.
