= Swapnam =

- Directed by: Babu Nanthankode
- Written by: P. Kesavadev; Thoppil Bhasi (dialogues)
- Screenplay by: Thoppil Bhasi
- Produced by: Sivan
- Starring: Madhu; Nanditha Bose; Sudheer; Jose Prakash
- Cinematography: Ashok Kumar
- Edited by: Ramesh
- Music by: Salil Chowdhary
- Release date: 3 August 1973
- Country: India
- Language: Malayalam

Swapnam (transl. Dream) is a 1973 Indian Malayalam-language film, directed by Babu Nanthankode. The film stars Madhu, Nanditha Bose, Sudheer and Jose Prakash. It was released on 3 August 1973.Ashok Kumar received the Kerala State Film Award for Best Cinematography.

== Cast ==
- Madhu as Viswanathan
- Nanditha Bose as Gauri
- Sudheer as Bindu
- Jose Prakash as Viswanathan's Brother
- Bahadoor as Kurup (Driver)
- Adoor Bhavani
- Aranmula Ponnamma as Viswanathan's Mother
- Aryad Gopalakrishnan
- Balan K. Nair
- Kottarakkara Sreedharan Nair
- Radhamani
- Radhadevi
- Rani Chandra
- Raghu
- Narayankutty
- Sundharam
- Mohan
- C.R Lakshmi
- Roksana
- Susheela
- Vasanthi
- Vyjayanthimala

== Soundtrack ==
Playback singer Vani Jairam was introduced to Malayalam cinema through the song "Sourayudhathil".

All lyrics are written by O. N. V. Kurup; all music is composed by Salil Chowdhury.

No.	Title	Artist(s)	Length
1.	"Maane Maane"	K. J. Yesudas
2.	"Mazhavilkodi" (Kaanakkuyile)	S. Janaki
3.	"Nee Varu Kaavyadevathe"	K. J. Yesudas
4.	"Shaarike En Shaarike"	S. Janaki
5.	"Sourayoodhathil"	Vani Jairam
