= Abhayam (1970 film) =

1970 film

- Directed by: Ramu Kariat
- Screenplay by: S. L. Puram Sadanandan
- Based on: Abhayam by Perumbadavam Sreedharan
- Produced by: Sobhana Parameswaran Nair
- Starring: Sheela; Madhu; Raghavan; Jose Prakash
- Cinematography: E. N. Balakrishnan; U. Rajagopal
- Edited by: K. Narayanan
- Music by: Original Songs: V. Dakshinamoorthy; Original Score: Salil Chowdhury
- Production company: Roopavani Films
- Release date: 4 September 1970
- Country: India
- Language: Malayalam

Abhayam is a 1970 Indian Malayalam-language film, directed by Ramu Kariyat and produced by Sobhana Parameswaran Nair. The film is an adaptation of the 1967 novel of the same name by Perumbadavam Sreedharan which was based on the life of Malayalam writer Rajalakshmi. The film stars Sheela, Madhu, Raghavan and Jose Prakash. The film featured original songs composed by V. Dakshinamoorthy and original musical score composed by Salil Chowdhury.

== Cast ==
- Sheela as Sethulakshmi
- Madhu as Balakrishnan
- Raghavan as Murali
- Jose Prakash as Vikraman
- Kottayam Santha as Devaki Amma
- Omanakuttan as Editor
- Prema as Sathi
- Sankaradi as Comrade Sankaran
- K. P. Pillai as Rikshawwala
- Krishnan Nair as Kunjunni Nair
- Devasya as Supplier Kuttappan
- Edie as Bhaskara Menon
- Kottayam Chellappan as Karunan
- Kshema as Student
- Mavelikkara Ponnamma as Saraswathi Amma
- Philomina as Sr. Briggitte
- Radhamani as Student
- S. P. Pillai as Pachu Pilla
- Sherin Sheela as Mini
- Sukumaran as Lecturer
- Veeran as Kunjukrishna Menon
- Vijayan Nair as Lecturer
- Hema as Student
- Unni Menon as Lecturer

== Soundtrack ==
The songs were composed by V. Dakshinamoorthy and featured lyrics written by Balamaniyamma, Changampuzha, Sreekumaran Thampi, G. Sankara Kurup, Vayalar Ramavarma, Kumaranasan, Vallathol, Sugathakumari and P. Bhaskaran.

The original background score of the movie was composed by Salil Chowdhury.

No.	Song	Singers	Lyrics	Length (m:ss)
1	"Ammathan Nenjil"	B. Vasantha	Balamaniyamma	
2	"Chumbanangalanumaathram"	P. Jayachandran	Changampuzha	
3	"Enteyeka Dhanamangu"	B. Vasantha	Sreekumaran Thampi	
4	"Eriyum Snehaardramaam"	P. Leela	G. Sankara Kurup	
5	"Kaama Krodha Lobha"	P. Jayachandran, P. Leela, C. Soman, C. O. Anto, T. Soman, Varghese	Vayalar Ramavarma	
6	"Maattuvin Chattangale"	M. G. Radhakrishnan	Kumaranasan	
7	"Nammude Mathaavu"	Latha Raju	Vallathol	
8	"Neeradalathaagriham"	S. Janaki	G. Sankara Kurup	
9	"Paarasparyashoonyamaakum"	B. Vasantha	Changampuzha	
10	"Paavam Maanavahridayam"	P. Susheela	Sugathakumari	
11	"Raavupoyathariyaathe"	P Susheela	P. Bhaskaran	
12	"Shraanthamambaram"	K. J. Yesudas	G. Sankara Kurup	
13	"Thaarathilum Tharuvilum"	V. Dakshinamoorthy	Sreekumaran Thampi	

== Box office ==
The film became a commercial success.
