= Bahadoor =

Indian actor

- Born: Padiyath Kochumoideen Kunjalu; 1930; Kodungalloor, Kingdom of Cochin, British India (present day Thrissur, Kerala, India)
- Died: 22 May 2000 (aged 69–70); Chennai, Tamil Nadu, India
- Years active: 1954–2000
- Spouse: Jameela
- Children: 3

Padiyath Kochumoideen Kunjalu (1930 – 22 May 2000), better known by his stage name Bahadoor, was an Indian actor who appeared in Malayalam films, primarily in comedic roles. He and Adoor Bhasi were the two major comedians in Malayalam cinema in the 1960s and 1970s. Bahadoor also appeared in character roles and in professional plays.

Bahadoor won three Kerala State Film Awards, including two Second Best Actor and a Best Comedian.

== Early life ==
Bahadoor was born as P. K. Kunjalu in 1930 in Kodungalloor, near Thrissur in Kingdom of Cochin (present day Kerala, India). As one of the nine children of Padiyath Blangachalil Kochumoideen and Khadeeja. Out of his eight siblings, seven were sisters. His family was financially poor and the seven young women added to the burden as the Kerala social system openly supported dowry at that time. He had affinity towards plays from very young age itself. He passed 10th Standard with First Class and joined Farook College, Calicut for Intermediate. He could not complete his studies due to financial troubles and had to start working for a living. He found his first job in a private bus as the bus conductor. He still wished to be an actor. He met Thikkurussi Sukumaran Nair through a relative. Thikkurussi gave him the chance to act in films and renamed him Bahadoor.

== Career ==
Bahadoor made his debut with a minor role in Avakasi (1954). At that time he also acted in Akashavani and amateur-professional plays and got established as a good actor. Bahadoor got his first break with his role as Chakkaravakkan in Neela Production's Padatha Painkili. The film, which went on to become a big hit, marked Bahadoor's presence in the industry.

He along with Adoor Bhasi formed a box office ruling combination and the duo has been compared to Laurel and Hardy. Bahadoor became the hero in Neelisali and Mucheettu Kalikkarante Makal. Bahadoor found time for acting in plays as well. He partnered a play production theatre which made blockbuster plays like Manikyakkottaram and Ballatha Pahayan. These plays were later made into feature films by him. In his entire career he appeared in a Tamil film Sathya starring Kamal Haasan, which was his only appearance in a non-Malayalam film, he played a supporting role as the father of Haasan's character.

Bahadoor started a black and white processing studio in Trivandrum named K. C. Lab. But the studio's establishment was ill-timed as films were shifting to colour. This caused financial troubles for Bahadoor and finally the studio was taken over by people to whom Bahadoor was indebted. Bahdoor also started a film distribution company only to face failures. He produced few films all of which failed at the box office. Even with his commercial debacles from the industry, he could meet his family's monetary requirements and mark his presence in the field of acting.

Bahadoor was last seen in Lohithadas's Joker. He did the role of a mentally ill veteran joker in a circus camp. The film was released shortly after his death.

== Personal life ==
He was married to Jameela. The couple have three children, Siddhiq, Muhammed and Rukiya.

During his final days, Bahadoor suffered various health ailments, like diabetes, hypertension and high cholesterol. Failing health made him leave the film industry. But, he returned through the film Joker. On 22 May 2000, Bahadoor was hospitalized after chest pain and died due to internal bleeding in his brain caused by a heart attack.

== Awards ==
Kerala State Film Awards

- Second Best Actor – 1973 – Madhavikutty
- Second Best Actor – 1976 – Aalinganam, Thulavarsham
- Best Comedian – 1972 – Various films

== Selected filmography ==
=== 1950s ===
Year	Title	Role	Notes
1954	Avakasi		
1954	Baalyasakhi	Pachu Pilla	
1955	Aniyathi	Bhasi	
1957	Padatha Painkili	Chakkara Vakkan	
1957	Jailppulli	Muthu	
1958	Mariakutty	Kasim	
1958	Nairu Pidicha Pulivaalu	Keshu	

=== 1960s ===
Year	Title	Role	Notes
1960	Umma	Mammooj	
1961	Kandam Bacha Kotte	Khader	
1961	Jnaanasundari	John	
1961	Unniyarcha	Kittu	
1962	Puthiya Akasam Puthiya Bhoomi	Sankaran/Gopakumar	
1962	Veluthambi Dalawa	Macauly's butler	
1963	Ammaye Kaanaan	Naanu	
1963	Ninamaninja Kalpadukal	Mammooju	
1964	School Master	Damodharan	
1964	Aadyakiranangal	Velu	
1964	Kutti Kuppayam	Avuran Mullakka	
1964	Kalanju Kittiya Thankam	K. Ramachandran Maithanam	
1965	Porter Kunjali	Pareed	
1965	Daham	Aliyar	
1965	Jeevithayaathra	Kochappan	
1965	Kuppivala	Poker/Chellathodu	
1965	Subaida	Mammu	
1966	Tharavattamma	Mr. Menon	
1967	Kasavuthattam	Pokker	
1967	Chitra Mela		Segment: "Penninte Prapancham"
1967	Balyakalasakhi		
1967	Ashwamedam	Krishnandaji	
1967	Agniputhri	Appunni Nair	
1968	Viplavakarikal	Govindan	
1968	Velutha Kathreena	Appayi	
1968	Midumidukki	Purushothaman	
1968	Punnapra Vayalar	Paappi mooppan	
1968	Kadal	Paul	
1968	Yakshi	Paramu	
1969	Ballatha Pahayan	Aliyar	
1969	Kadalpalam	Appu	
1969	Adimakal	Bhargavan	
1969	Urangatha Sundary	Panicker	
1969	Velliyazhcha	Madanan	

=== 1970s ===
Year	Title	Role	Notes
1970	Vazhve Mayam	Kuttappan	
1970	Aranazhikaneram	Kunjucherukkan	
1970	Nizhalattam	Kurup	
1970	Cross Belt	Thilakan	
1970	Bheekara Nimishangal	Sankaran	
1970	Mindapennu	Unnikrishanan	
1970	Oonjal	Appu Nair	
1970	Thurakkatha Vathil	Narayanankutty	
1971	C.I.D. Nazir	Pappu	
1971	Rathri Vandi		
1971	Sindooracheppu	Mammad	
1971	Achante Bharya	Balan Nair	
1971	Line Bus	Vareed	
1971	Anadha Shilpangal	Balakrishnan	
1971	Sumangali	Keeri Keshava Kuruppu	
1971	Vilakku Vangiya Veena	Prathapan	
1971	Ernakulam Junction	Kunjali	
1971	Thettu	Kochappi	
1971	Anubhavangal Paalichakal	Hamsa	
1972	Miss Mary	Raju	
1972	Kandavarundo	Venu	
1972	Omana	Lonappan	
1972	Professor	Magician	
1972	Chembarathi	Vasu	
1972	Taxi Car	Nadathara Rajappan	
1972	Achanum Bappayum	Abdulla	
1972	Aradimanninte Janmi	Ouseppu	
1972	Adyathe Kadha	Kuttan Pilla	
1972	Panimudakku	Salim/Ummer	
1972	Maravil Thirivu Sookshikkuka	Puncture Antony	
1973	Panitheeratha Veedu		
1973	Interview	Kuttappan	
1973	Nakhangal	Pappu	
1973	Kapalika	Gopalan	
1973	Azhakulla Saleena	Daiman Mathai	
1973	Chuzhi	Abbas	
1973	Dharmayudham	Vikraman	
1973	Maram	Mollakka	
1973	Manushyaputhran	Kochu Govindan	
1973	Achani	Appu	
1973	Panitheeratha Veedu	Moideen Kakka, Hameed	
1973	Kaadu	Sekhar	
1973	Padmavyooham	Paulose	
1973	Kalachakram	Prabha	
1973	Divya Darshanam	Velappan Panikkar	
1973	Jesus		
1973	Yamini	Doc Chandran	
1973	Ladies Hostel	Kuttan Pilla	
1973	Udayam	Ittiyavara	
1973	Swargaputhri	Kunjali	
1973	Panchavadi	Keshava Pilla	
1974	Rajahamsam	Keshavan Nair	
1974	Chattakkari	Rahim	
1974	College Girl	Damu	
1974	Panchathanthram	Guptha	
1974	Poonthenaruvi	Poovan	
1974	Thacholi Marumakan Chandu	Pokkan	
1974	Manyasree Viswamithran	Balachandran	
1974	Night Duty	Readymade Krishnankutty	
1974	Pattabhishekam	Bahadoor	
1974	Bhoomidevi Pushpiniyayi	Appunni	
1974	Ayalathe Sundari	Pappu Pilla	
1974	Nellu	Seythali	
1975	Neela Ponman	Paappi	
1975	Thomashleeha		
1975	Alibabayum 41 Kallanmarum	Shukkur	
1975	Ayodhya	Jayaraman	
1975	Babumon	Panikkar	
1975	Penpada	Vasu	
1975	Love Marriage	Gopi	
1975	Hello Darling	Appukuttan	
1975	Picnic	Venu	
1975	Pravaham	Kunnel Raghavan	
1976	Themmadi Velappan	Kuttappan	
1976	Thulavarsham	Ayappan	
1976	Ayiram Janmagal	A. Krishnan	
1976	Aalinganam	Rajashekharan	
1976	Chirikudukka	Babu, Paraman	
1976	Ayalkkari	Varghese	
1976	Panchami	Philippose	
1976	Prasadam		
1976	Light House	Damu	
1977	Randu Lokam	Govindan	
1977	Angeekaram	Gangadharan	
1977	Abhinivesham	Rajan	
1977	Samudram	Shekhardas	
1977	Aparadhi	Ouseppachan	
1977	Anugraham	Madhavan Pilla	
1977	Shankupushppam	Mammad	
1977	Poojakkedukkatha Pookkal	Kuttan Pilla	
1978	Rathi Nirvedham	Kochammani	
1978	Itha Oru Manushyan	Nanu	
1978	Agni		
1978	Kanyaka	Aliyar	
1978	Ee Manohara Theeram	Mathai	
1978	Arum Anyaralla	Pralokam Pappu	
1979	Neelathamara	Achuthan Nair	
1979	Ezhunirangal	Pappachan	
1979	Ivide Kattinu Sugandam	Raman Pilla	
1979	Itha Oru Theeram	Sankara Pilla	
1979	Allauddinum Albhutha Vilakkum	Hakkim Moulavi Sahib	
1979	Kazhukan	Pimp Mani	

=== 1980s ===
Year	Title	Role	Notes
1980	Theekkadal	Shekharan Pillai	
1980	Sakthi	Paramu Pillai	
1980	Lava	Govindan	
1980	Aravam	Murukayya	
1980	Prakadanam	Master	
1980	Vilkkanundu Swapnangal	Mammukka	
1981	Palangal	Varkey	
1981	Sanchari	Sankaran	
1981	Grihalakshmi	Raman Pilla	
1981	Greeshmajwaala	Unnithan	
1981	Guha	Chandrasekhara Kaimal	
1981	Kathayariyathe	Raman Nair	
1982	Sara Varsham	Ravunni Nair	
1982	Ponnum Poovum	Khadir	
1982	Beedikunjamma	Velu Nair	
1982	Anuraagakkodathi	Gopalan	
1982	Kurukkante Kalyanam	Soopi Hajiyar	
1983	Nizhal Moodiya Nirangal	Kakka	
1983	Eettillam	Njodi Vasu	
1983	Visa	Kuttyalikka	
1983	Mandanmmar Londanil	Choyi Mooppan	
1983	Swapname Ninakku Nandi	Bakker	
1983	Maniyara	Hassanali	
1983	Naseema	School Master	
1983	Veena Poovu	Kudayaani	
1983	Mazha Nilaavu	Abdulla	
1984	Piriyilla Naam	Vareechan	
1984	Ivide Thudangunnu	Kurup	
1984	Appunni	Hajiyar	
1984	Vellam	Kuttan Nair	
1984	Manithali	Kunjanikka	
1984	Kaliyil Alpam Karyam	Rarichan Nair	
1984	Oru Sumangaliyude Katha	Kumaradas	
1984	Thacholi Thankappan	Abu	
1984	Kudumbam Oru Swargam Bharya Oru Devatha	Krishna Pilla	
1984	Adiyozhukkukal	Muni Kakka	
1985	Koodum Thedi	Judy's Father	
1985	Janakeeya Kodathi	Suma's Father	
1985	Azhiyatha Bandhangal	Easwara Pillai	
1985	Adhyayam Onnu Muthal	Maash	
1985	Makan Ente Makan	Sankan Nair	
1985	Anu Bandham	Madhavan	
1985	Ente Kanakkuyil	Sankara Pillai	
1985	Oru Sandesham Koodi	Rajasekharan Nair	
1985	Kathodu Kathoram	Paily	
1985	Kiratham	Musliyar	
1986	Pappan Priyappetta Pappan	Padmanaban/Pappan	
1986	Revathikkoru Pavakkutty	Ayyappan Pillai	
1986	Oppam Oppathinoppam		
1986	Oru Yugasandhya	Pappu Pilla	
1986	Kochu Themmadi	Kelappan Nair	
1986	Katturumbinum Kathu Kuthu	Minister	
1986	Adukkan Entheluppam	Peter	
1987	Kaalathinte Sabhdam	Nanu Pilla	
1987	Naradhan Keralathil	Kuttan Pillai	
1987	Anantaram	Mathai	
1987	Neeyallengil Njan	Pilla	
1987	Ithrayum Kalam	Khader	
1988	Aranyakam	Nanu	
1988	Sathyaa	Rajarathinam Mudaliyar	Tamil film
1988	Oru CBI Diary Kurippu	Thomachan	
1989	Bhadrachitta		
1989	Devadas	Raman Nair	
1989	Crime Branch	Mukundan Nair	
1989	Oru Sayahnathinte Swapnam	Kunju Krishna Kaimal	

=== 1990s ===
Year	Title	Role	Notes
1990	Orukkam	Kumaran	
1990	Thoovalsparsham	Nair	
1990	Oliyampukal	T. P. Chackochan	
1991	Kilukkampetti	Muthachan	
1992	Soorya Gayathri	Kunjali	
1992	Malootty	Kuttan Pillai	
1993	Ghoshayathra	Saidukka	
1994	Varanamaalyam	Kunjunni	
1994	Parinayam	Kizhakkedam	
1995	Sphadikam	Kurup	
1996	Vanarasena	Lambodaran	
1996	Man of the Match		
1997	Oru Yathramozhi	Pappan	
2000	Joker	Abookka	
