= Thurakkatha Vathil =

- Directed by: P. Bhaskaran
- Written by: K. T. Muhammed
- Produced by: A. Raghunath
- Starring: Prem Nazir; Madhu; Jayabharathi; Sreelatha Namboothiri
- Cinematography: U. Rajagopal; Benjamin
- Edited by: K. Narayanan
- Music by: K. Raghavan
- Production company: Sanjay Productions
- Distributed by: Sanjay Productions
- Release date: 15 August 1970
- Country: India
- Language: Malayalam

Thurakkatha Vathil is a 1970 Indian Malayalam film, directed by P. Bhaskaran and produced by A. Raghunath. The film stars Prem Nazir, Madhu, (Ragini) Jayabharathi and Sreelatha Namboothiri. The film's musical score was by K. Raghavan. The movie received the National Award for the best film on National Integration in 1970. It was the second Malayalam film to win this award. The first was Janmabhoomi in 1967. Philomina won the Kerala State Film Award for Second Best Actress for this movie.

== Cast ==
- Prem Nazir as Bappu
- Madhu as Vasu
- Ragini as Sulekha
- Jayabharathi as Nabeesa
- Philomina as Umma
- Sreelatha Namboothiri as Ambujam
- Bahadoor as Narayanankutty
- B. K. Pottekkad
- C. A. Balan as Kuttan Nair
- Khadeeja
- Nellikode Bhaskaran as Ali Mullakka
- Radhamani
- Raghava Menon
- Ramankutty

== Soundtrack ==
The music was composed by K. Raghavan and the lyrics were written by P. Bhaskaran.

| No. | Song | Singers | Lyrics | Length (m:ss) |
|---|---|---|---|---|
| 1 | "Kadakkannin Muna Kondu" | S. Janaki, Renuka | P. Bhaskaran | |
| 2 | "Manassinullil" | S. Janaki | P. Bhaskaran | |
| 3 | "Nalikerathinte" | K. J. Yesudas | P. Bhaskaran | |
| 4 | "Navayugaprakaashame" | K. J. Yesudas | P. Bhaskaran | |
| 5 | "Paarvanenduvin" | K. J. Yesudas | P. Bhaskaran | |
