= Penpuli =

- Directed by: Crossbelt Mani
- Written by: Jagathy N. K. Achari
- Screenplay by: Jagathy N. K. Achari
- Starring: KPAC Lalitha; Adoor Bhasi; Unnimary; Rajakokila
- Cinematography: E. N. Balakrishnan
- Edited by: Chakrapani
- Music by: G. Devarajan
- Production company: Rose Movies
- Distributed by: Rose Movies
- Release date: 15 September 1977
- Country: India
- Language: Malayalam

Penpuli is a 1977 Indian Malayalam-language film, directed by Crossbelt Mani. The film stars KPAC Lalitha, Adoor Bhasi, Unnimary and Rajakokila. The film's score is composed by G. Devarajan.

== Cast ==
- KPAC Lalitha
- Adoor Bhasi
- Unnimary
- Rajakokila
- Vijaya
- Vincent

== Soundtrack ==
The music was composed by G. Devarajan with lyrics by Mankombu Gopalakrishnan.

No.	Song	Singers	Lyrics	Length (m:ss)
1	"Palliyarakkaavile"	P. Madhuri	Mankombu Gopalakrishnan	
2	"Raathri Raathri"	P. Madhuri	Mankombu Gopalakrishnan	
3	"Sahyaachalathile"	Jolly Abraham, Karthikeyan	Mankombu Gopalakrishnan	
4	"Varavarnnini"	K. J. Yesudas	Mankombu Gopalakrishnan	
