= Preeyasakhi Radha =

- Directed by: K. P. Pillai
- Written by: Dr. Pavithran; Dr. Pavithran (dialogues)
- Screenplay by: Dr. Pavithran
- Produced by: Ambalathara Divakaran
- Starring: Lakshmi; Prathap Pothen; M. G. Soman; Priya
- Cinematography: T. N. Krishnankutty Nair
- Edited by: M. N. Appu
- Music by: V. Dakshinamoorthy
- Production company: HD Combines
- Distributed by: HD Combines
- Release date: 17 September 1982
- Country: India
- Language: Malayalam

Preeyasakhi Radha is a 1982 Indian Malayalam-language film, directed by K. P. Pillai and produced by Ambalathara Divakaran. The film stars Lakshmi, Prathap Pothen, M. G. Soman and Priya. The film's score was composed by V. Dakshinamoorthy.

== Cast ==
- Lakshmi
- Prathap Pothen
- M. G. Soman
- Priya
- Sujatha

== Soundtrack ==
The music was composed by V. Dakshinamoorthy with lyrics by Sreekumaran Thampi.

No.	Song	Singers	Lyrics	Length (m:ss)
1	"Akale Ninnu Njan"	K. J. Yesudas	Sreekumaran Thampi	
2	"Chiriyude Kavitha"	P. Susheela	Sreekumaran Thampi	
3	"Sindooram Pooshi"	Vani Jairam	Sreekumaran Thampi	
4	"Vilichal Kelkkaathe"	K. J. Yesudas	Sreekumaran Thampi	
