= Samooham =

- Film poster
- Directed by: Sathyan Anthikad
- Written by: J. Pallassery
- Produced by: Raju Mathew
- Starring: Suresh Gopi; Suhasini; Manoj K. Jayan; Sreenivasan; Vineeth
- Cinematography: Vipin Mohan
- Edited by: K. Rajagopal
- Music by: Johnson
- Production company: Century Films
- Release date: 25 June 1993
- Country: India
- Language: Malayalam

Samooham (English: Society) is a 1993 Malayalam drama film, directed by Sathyan Anthikad, with Suresh Gopi, Suhasini, Manoj K. Jayan, Sreenivasan and Vineeth in the lead roles.

== Plot ==
Sudhakaran runs his paddy field agriculture efficiently despite the workers being too lazy to do the work correctly. Sudhakaran leaves the field for home, knowing Rajalakshmi has come. Sudhakaran and Rajalakshmi love each other since childhood. Rajalakshmi is the daughter of a Sakavu who was known as a workaholic for the party. So the party member Nedumudi always inspires Rajalakshmi to be the contestant of their party. Rajalakshmi, when asked to speak in front of the public, cries and on one day says never vote for her. With this attitude people like Rajalakshmi wins the election becoming MLA. Now one day goons burn down poor people's huts and the people come to Rajalakshmi's house for help. Rajalakshmi visits the burnt area and goes to the police station. Here, Rajalakshmi tells them to arrest the criminals, but the police refuse. For this, Rajalakshmi protested in front of the minister's car, ending up with the police handling the protesting group. Johnny, whose father died in the fire attack, has filed a case against the criminals. Now Krishnamurti, who is behind the attack because of his election defeat, kills Johnny. The next day, news spreads that Johnny's suicide is due to financial burden. But Rajalakshmi protests. To this, Udhayan, who has seen the murder, confesses to Rajalakshmi. From here on, the case becomes stronger, CBI investigation is asked for. But Krishnamurti's goons rape Radhika, who is sister of Rajalakshmi. CBI investigation gets strong when the chief gunda who murdered Johnny gets arrested and confesses. Finally at court, after a hearing, the court orders punishment for Krishnamurti, who is now arrested and taken handcuffed. Evidence is strong because of a newspaper article written by Pavithran with full evidence. Krishnamurti, while walking out of court, hits away a policeman, takes the gun and shoots at Pavithran, who gets killed. Now, a fight occurs where Krishnamurti's goons are on one side and Sudhakaran and Majeed are on the other side, finally defeating Krishnamurti. The film ends with Sudhakaran apologising for misunderstanding Rajalakshmi as a power desiring person with no family affection and thereon is ready to give full support for Rajalakshmi's career in politics to help people.

== Cast ==
- Suresh Gopi as Sudhakaran
- Suhasini as M.L.A Rajalakshmi
- Manoj K. Jayan as Majeed
- Sreenivasan as Ramachandran
- Nedumudi Venu as Balan Poduval
- Rajan P. Dev as SP
- John Amritharaj as Krishnamoorthy
- Sunitha as Radhika
- Vineeth as Udayan
- T. R. Omana as Rajalakshmi's mother
- Sankaradi as Rajalakshmi's Uncle
- Mamukkoya as Karyasthan
- Jose Pellissery as Sukumaran Nair
- Zeenath
- Sudheesh as Johnny
- Shivaji as Doctor Chandran Menon
- Bindu Panicker as Gopika
- Bobby Kottarakkara
- Mavelikkara Ponnamma as Sudhakaran's Mother
- Suvarna Mathew as Thulasi
- Kollam Thulasi as Chief Minister
- Kundara Johny as Anto
- C. I. Paul as Minister Narayanan Nair
- Devi S. child artist
- Rugmini
- Biju Pappan as Jayan

== Soundtrack ==
Samooham

Soundtrack album by Johnson
- Genre: Film
- Language: Malayalam

The film features songs composed by Johnson and written by Kaithapram.

| Track | Song title | Singer(s) |
|---|---|---|
| 1 | "Kandeno (Odakkombil Kaattu Kinungippoy)" | K. S. Chithra |
| 2 | "Sree Raghukula" | K. S. Chithra |
| 3 | "Thoomanjin Nenchilothungi" | K. J. Yesudas |
