= Naseema =

- Directed by: A. Sheriff
- Screenplay by: Raghunath Paleri
- Story by: A. Sheriff
- Starring: Mohanlal; Nedumudi Venu; Nithya; Ranipadmini
- Cinematography: Babu Joseph
- Edited by: N. P. Suresh
- Music by: Johnson
- Release date: 4 March 1983
- Country: India
- Language: Malayalam

Naseema is a 1983 Indian Malayalam film, directed by A. Sheriff. The film stars Mohanlal, Nedumudi Venu, Nithya, and Ranipadmini in the lead roles. The film has a musical score by Johnson.

== Cast ==
- Mohanlal as Saithali
- Nedumudi Venu as Ravi
- Nithya as Usha
- Ranipadmini as Naseema
- Achankunju as Mammad
- Bahadoor as Master
- Bobby Kottarakkara
- Philomina as Naseema's mother
- Santhakumari as Ravi's mother

== Soundtrack ==
The music was composed by Johnson and the lyrics were written by P. Bhaskaran.

No.	Song	Singers	Lyrics	Length (m:ss)
1	"Achan Kombathu Amma Varambathu"	K. J. Yesudas	P. Bhaskaran	
2	"Aruna Kirana Mani Gopura Vaathilil"	K. J. Yesudas	P. Bhaskaran	
3	"Ennittum Neeyenne Arinjillallo"	S. Janaki	P. Bhaskaran	
