= Babu Nanthankode =

South Indian film director

- Born: Thiruvananthapuram, India
- Occupation: Film director
- Years active: 1972–1978

Babu Nanthankode is a South Indian film director who works mainly in the Malayalam film industry. Born in Thiruvananthapuram, Nanthankode displayed a storyteller's potential from an early age. His movies are known for their realistic and sensitive portrayal of the village life.

== Filmography ==
- Dhakam (1972; Tamil)
- Swapnam (1973)
- Youvanam (1974)
- Bhaarya Illaatha Raathri (1975)
- Sathyathinte Nizhalil (1975)
- Maanasaveena (1976)
- Karnaparvam (1977)
- Ahalya (1978)
