= Thacholi Marumakan Chandu =

1974 Malayalam movie

- Directed by: P. Bhaskaran
- Written by: N. Govindankutty
- Screenplay by: N. Govindankutty
- Produced by: P. Bhaskaran
- Starring: Prem Nazir; Sukumari; Jayabharathi; Srividya
- Cinematography: U. Rajagopal
- Edited by: K. Sankunni
- Music by: V. Dakshinamoorthy
- Production company: Suchithramanjari
- Distributed by: Suchithramanjari
- Release date: 29 August 1974
- Country: India
- Language: Malayalam

Thacholi Marumakan Chandu (transl. Chandu, the Nephew of Thacholi) is a 1974 Indian Malayalam-language film, directed and produced by P. Bhaskaran. The film stars Prem Nazir, Sukumari, Jayabharathi and Srividya. The film had musical score by V. Dakshinamoorthy.

== Cast ==
- Prem Nazir as Thacholi Othenan Kurup, Chandu (double role)
- Sukumari as Kunki
- Jayabharathi as Thazhathumadom Maathu
- Srividya as Kanni
- Adoor Bhasi as Kandacheri Chappan
- Thikkurissy Sukumaran Nair
- Sreelatha Namboothiri as Kuttimani
- T. R. Omana as Maakkam
- Bahadoor as Pokkan
- K. P. Ummer as Kandarar Menon
- Meena as Eppennu
- Balan K Nair as Yenali
- Kaviyoor Ponnamma as Unnichirutha
- Philomina as Nanga
- Sankaradi as Thazhathumadom Kannoth Moothavar
- T. S. Muthaiah as Guru
- S. P. Pilla as Vaittil Thampan
- Muthukulam Ragavan Pilla as Kanachira Kannappan
- N. Govindankutty as Kunjikelu
- Santo Krishnan

== Soundtrack ==
The music was composed by V. Dakshinamoorthy and the lyrics were written by P. Bhaskaran.

No.	Song	Singers	Lyrics	Length (m:ss)
1	"Illam Nira Vallam Nira"	Chorus, Kalyani Menon	P. Bhaskaran	
2	"Induchoodan Bhagavaante"	S. Janaki	P. Bhaskaran	
3	"Kannalmizhi Kanimalare"	K. J. Yesudas, S. Janaki	P. Bhaskaran	
4	"Kudakumala Kunnimala"	Ambili, S. T. Sasidharan	P. Bhaskaran	
5	"Onnaaman Kochuthumbi"	Ambili, Chorus, Sreelatha Namboothiri	P. Bhaskaran	
6	"Pachamalakkiliye"	Chorus, Sreelatha Namboothiri	P. Bhaskaran	
7	"Thacholi Omana Kunjichanthu"	P. Jayachandran, Chorus		
8	"Vadakkini Thalathile"	S. Janaki	P. Bhaskaran	
9	"Vrischikappoonilaave"	K. J. Yesudas	P. Bhaskaran	
