= Ara Nazhika Neram =

1967 novel by Parappurath

- Author: Parappurath
- Language: Malayalam
- Genre: Novel
- Publisher: Sahithya Pravarthaka Co-operative Society, Poorna Publications
- Publication date: 1967
- Publication place: India
- Pages: 260
- Awards: 1968: Kerala Sahitya Akademi Award

Ara Nazhika Neram (Half an Hour Only) is a Malayalam novel written by Parappurath in 1967. One of the most famous novels by the prolific author, it won the Kerala Sahitya Akademi Award and Sahitya Pravartaka Award. Set in the Central Travancore region in the 1960s, the story revolves round an Orthodox Christian family headed by Kunjenachan, a ninety-year-old patriarch who lives his life by the book. The novel had a highly successful film adaptation with the same title in 1970. The film was directed by K. S. Sethumadhavan and featured Prem Nazir, Kottarakkara Sreedharan Nair, Sathyan, K. P. Ummer, Adoor Bhasi, Ragini, Sheela and Ambika Sukumaran.

== Main characters ==
- Kunjonachan, a ninety-year-old patriarch at death's door
- Keevarechan, Pilipochan, Mathukutty, Kunjucherukkan - Kunjonachan's sons
- Shivaramakurup (Kuruppachan) - Kunjonachan's friend
- Rajan - Mathukutty's son
- Deenamma - Mathukutty's second wife
- Kuttiyamma - Kunjonachan's granddaughter
- Shanthamma - Rajan's wife
- Achen from Kozhencherry

== Award ==
In 1996, the Odia translation of the same book "Muhan-Sanjha" by Jiwan Pani got the Sahitya Akademi Translation Award.
