= Ore Thanthai =

- Poster
- Directed by: M. Karnan
- Screenplay by: M. Karnan
- Dialogue by: Aaroor Dass
- Story by: M. Karnan
- Produced by: A. Murugan; P. S. Pandian
- Starring: Jaishankar; Rajakokila
- Cinematography: M. Karnan
- Edited by: R. Devarajan
- Music by: Shankar–Ganesh
- Production company: Murugu Films
- Release date: 26 March 1976
- Country: India
- Language: Tamil

Ore Thanthai (/oʊreɪ/ transl. Same father) is a 1976 Indian Tamil-language Western film photographed and directed by M. Karnan who also wrote the screenplay and story. The film stars Jaishankar and Rajakokila, with Major Sundarrajan, Thengai Srinivasan, A. Karunanidhi, S. V. Ramadas and Suruli Rajan in supporting roles. It was released on 26 March 1976.

== Cast ==
- Jaishankar
- Rajakokila
- Major Sundarrajan
- Thengai Srinivasan
- A. Karunanidhi
- S. V. Ramadas
- Suruli Rajan
- K. Kannan
- Ganga Ramakrishnan
- M. N. Rajam
- Salima
- Vijayachandrika
- ISR
- Usilai Mani

== Production ==
The song "Ammadiyo" was shot in 1974 at Pahalgam, Kashmir, with shooting for that song completed in a day and a half.

== Soundtrack ==
The soundtrack was composed by Shankar–Ganesh, with lyrics by Kannadasan.

Track listing
| No. | Title | Singer(s) | Length |
|---|---|---|---|
| 1. | "Adiyungal Valikkaathu" | L. R. Eswari |
| 2. | "Maanicka Ther" | P. Susheela, T. M. Soundararajan |
| 3. | "Ammadiyo" | L. R. Eswari |
| 4. | "Poochendu" | L. R. Eswari |

== Release and reception ==
Ore Thanthai was released on 26 March 1976. It was one of several films in the 1970s that cemented Jaishankar's status as an action hero.
