= Mullurkara =

Mullurkara mullurkara
- village
- Location in Kerala, India Mullurkara (India)
- Coordinates: 10°42′0″N 76°16′0″E
- Country: India
- State: Kerala
- District: Thrissur

Government
  - Body: Panchayat

Population (2011)
  - Total: 13,491

Languages Malayalam
  - Official: Malayalam, English
- Time zone: UTC+5:30 (IST)
- PIN: 680583
- Vehicle registration: KL-48

Mullurkara is a village in Thalapilly Taluk of Thrissur district in the state of Kerala, India. The Malayalam film actress Philomina was born here.

== Demographics ==
As of 2011 India census, Mullurkara had a population of 13491 with 6523 males and 6968 females. Mullurkara falls on the Palakkad - Thrisshur Highway. Shoranur Jn is the nearest bigger Rail head. Nearest Airport is Nedumbassery Airport ( Cochin), which is approximately 1.5 hours drive. Thrissur medical college (m g kavu) 16 km
