= Mavelikkara Ponnamma =

Indian actress

- Died: 6 September 1995
- Occupation: Film actor
- Years active: 1940–1995
- Spouse: Raghava Panicker
- Children: Sushama Padmanabhan

Mavelikkara Ponnamma (died 6 September 1995) was an Indian actress in Malayalam movies. She was one of the prominent supporting actress in late 1970s and 1990s in Malayalam movies. She is noted for her performance in Ulladakkam (1991), Aakasha Kottayile Sultan (1991) and Ennodu Ishtam Koodamo (1992).

== Personal life ==
She belongs to the Mavelikkara Palace clan in Mavelikkara, Kerala. She was married to Raghava Panicker. The couple had a daughter, Sushama Padmanabhan.

== Career ==
She was a government school teacher by profession, but her life was drama and films. She was one of the foremost females to start acting on stage in the 1940s when female roles were done on stage by men. She had acted in more than 500 stage dramas with renowned troupes like KPAC and Kalanilayam. She had acted with all of the top artistes of her time like Sebastian kunju kunju bhagavathar, Augustine joseph ( Singer Yesudas's father) T. N. Gopinathan Nair, Thoppil Bhasi, O Madhavan ( Actor Mukesh's father) etc.

She started acting in films in 1963 in the Udaya movies film Kadalamma in which she was the heroine and Sathyan was the hero. She acted in few other films during those days like Oru Sundariyude Katha with Prem Nazir and Jayabharathi and few other films. However, since her job as a teacher didn't allow her to take long leaves and those days since most of the films were being shot in Madras, she discontinued acting till she retired from government service.

She returned to big screen in 1989 with the K P Kumaran directed Award-winning movie Rugmini which had the story by Madhavikutty. Later she starred in movies like Jayaraj's Akasakottayile Sultan- with Srinivasan, Kamal's Ennodishtam Koodamo- with Mukesh, Madhubhala, Kamal's Ulladakkam with Mohanlal, Shobhana etc., Siby Malayil's Lohithadas scripted Valayam with Murali, Manoj K Jayan etc., T.V Chandrans’ Ponthan Mada with Mammootty, Sasinas based on Vaikom Muhammad Basheer's life story with Asokhan, Kidilol Kidilam with Narendra Prasad, Rajan P Dev and Rekha, Thalamura with Narendra Prasad, Madhu and Anju, Pidakkozhi Koovunna Noottandu with Urvashi, Ratheesh, Vinayaprasad, Sathyan Anthikkad's Samooham with Suresh Gopi, Suhasini Manirathnam etc.

She was the recipient of the Kerala Sangeetha Nataka Akademi Award in 1962, Kerala Sangeetha Nataka Akademi Fellowship in 1993, and many other noted awards.

She died on 6 September 1995 at the Sree Uthradom thirunal hospital due to heart attack.

== Partial filmography ==
=== As an actress ===
Year	Title	Role	Notes
1940	Gnanambika		
1955	Aniyathi		
1956	Manthravadi	Kanthimathi	
1960	Umma	Pathumma	
1961	Unniyarcha		
1961	Krishna Kuchela		
1963	Kadalamma	Chithrangatha	
1963	Ninamaninja Kalpadukal		
1964	Devaalayam		
1967	Anweshichu Kandethiyilla		
1970	Abhayam	Saraswathiyamma	
1970	Nilakkatha Chalanangal		
1972	Oru Sundariyude Katha	Thankachi	
1986	Ammanamkili	Saraswathi Amma	
1989	Rugmini	Sathyabhai	
1991	Ulladakkam	Mental Patient	
1991	Aakasha Kottayile Sultan	Mariyamma	
1992	Valayam	Ammini	
1992	Ennodu Ishtam Koodamo	Arathi's Grandmother	
1993	Thalamura		
1993	Samooham	Sudhakaran's mother	
1994	Ponthan Mada		
1994	Pidakkozhi Koovunna Noottandu	Ammachi	
1995	Kidilol Kidilam	Lakshmiyamma	
1995	Shashinaas		

=== As a playback singer ===
- Priyachandra Mamachandran as Jnaanaambika (1940)
- Manojnam as Jnaanaambika (1940)
- Maayaarasitham as Jnaanaambika (1940)
- Jeevitheshane as Jnaanaambika (1940)

== Television career ==
- Oru Poo Viriyunnu
- Cherappayi
- Lambo {telefilm}
- Manchiyam {telefilm}

== Dramas ==
- Sthree
