= Dhakam =

- Directed by: Babu Nanthankode
- Screenplay by: K. K. Raman
- Story by: Babu Nanthankode; T. Vaiyadurai
- Produced by: Janakiraman
- Starring: R. Muthuraman; Nanditha Bose
- Cinematography: T. Vaiyadurai
- Music by: M. B. Sreenivasan
- Production company: Kavya Chitra
- Running time: 144 minutes
- Country: India
- Language: Tamil

Dhakam (/ˈðɑːˌɡəm/ transl. Thirst) is an Indian Tamil-language romantic drama film by Babu Nanthankode in his directorial debut. He co-wrote the story with T. Vaiyadurai, who also handled the cinematography. The film stars R. Muthuraman and Nanditha Bose. Filmed in 1972, it did not see a theatrical release, but has been screened at many film festivals.

== Plot ==
Sharada, an orphan, lives an ashram, where she bonds with a Sekhar, a blind man. They eventually marry, and she tries to make a living as a saleswoman in Madras, but city life is too much for them and they return to the ashram. Sharada dies, having donated her eyes to a blind person.

== Cast ==
- R. Muthuraman as Sekhar
- Nanditha Bose as Sharada

Other supporting roles are played by Major Sundarrajan, Pandari Bai, Rajakokila, Renuka Parvathi and Jayaseelam.

== Production ==
Dhakam, the directorial debut of Babu Nanthankode, was conceived by him and T. Vaiyadurai while they were working at the staff of the Madras Film Institute. It was produced by Janakiraman under the banner Kavya Chitra. The screenplay was written by K. K. Raman, based on the story of Nanthankode and Vaiyadurai; the latter also handled the cinematography. P. S. Nivas worked as assistant cinemotographer Shooting took place in 1972, primarily at Gandhigram, Tamil Nadu. The final cut of the film measured 144 minutes.

== Soundtrack ==
The soundtrack was composed by M. B. Sreenivasan, while Bharati and Poovai Senguttuvan were the lyricists. The songs "Vanam Namadhu Thanthai" and "Bharata Samudayam" attained popularity.

Track listing
No.	Title	Lyrics	Singer(s)	Length
1.	"Urugidum Velaiyilum Nalla"	Poovai Senguttuvan	S. Janaki
2.	"Vaanam Namadhu Thanthai"	Poovai Senguttuvan	S. Janaki
3.	"Vaanamengum Parithiyin"	Subramania Bharati	K. J. Yesudas

== Release and reception ==
Dhakam did not have a theatrical release, but has been screened at many film festivals. It was reviewed by a number of critics in February 1974. Kanthan of Kalki appreciated the film for eschewing stylish costumes, makeup for the lead actors, and elaborate sets. Navamani praised the acting, music, cinematography and concluded calling it a suitable film for those who wish to watch something different. M. A. Srinivasan from Free India praised the makers for avoiding the cliches of Tamil cinema while also appreciating the acting ,music, cinematography and concluded praising both director and producer for giving "us a beautiful and work of art" and added "The picture is one which is one which should be seen appreciated and enjoyed".

== Legacy ==
Dhakam was influential in establishing the art film scenario in Tamil cinema. Ashish Rajadhyaksha and Paul Willemen, in their book Encyclopedia of Indian Cinema, say the film served as an inspiration for Aval Appadithan (1978).

== Bibliography ==
- Baskaran, S. Theodore (1996). The Eye of the Serpent: An Introduction to Tamil Cinema. Chennai: East West Books. OCLC 243920437.
- Rajadhyaksha, Ashish; Willemen, Paul (1998) [1994]. Encyclopaedia of Indian Cinema. British Film Institute and Oxford University Press. ISBN 0-19-563579-5.
- Shanmugasundaram, S. (1997). பாரதிராஜா :மண்ணும் மக்களும் [Bharathiraja: The Land and Its People]. Kaavya. OCLC 38305218.
- Sujatha (2006). கணையாழி கடைசிப் பக்கங்கள்: 1965–1998 [The Final Pages of Kanaiyazhi: 1965–1998]. உயிர்மை பதிப்பகம். ISBN 9788189912109.
