= Mandanmmar Londonil =

- Directed by: Sathyan Anthikad
- Written by: P. Balakrishnan
- Screenplay by: P. Balakrishnan
- Produced by: P. H. Rasheed
- Starring: Jagathy Sreekumar; Nedumudi Venu; Sankaradi; Sukumaran
- Cinematography: Anandakuttan
- Edited by: G. Venkittaraman
- Music by: Shyam
- Production company: Riyas Movies
- Distributed by: Riyas Movies
- Release date: 19 August 1983
- Country: India
- Language: Malayalam

Mandanmmar Londonil (English:Idiots in London) is a 1983 Indian Malayalam-language slapstick comedy film, directed by Sathyan Anthikad and produced by P. H. Rasheed. The film stars Sukumaran, Jalaja, Jagathy Sreekumar, Sankaradi and Nedumudi Venu in the lead roles. The film has musical score by Shyam. The film regarded as a cult classic in Malayalam cinema.

== Plot ==
Thalayillakkunnu is a rural village in Kerala, India. There is a "Kala Samithi" in this village which performs dramas in temples. When Chandran Menon comes to Thalayillakkunnu from London, he promises them that five people from the village can be taken to London for performing there. Rasheed, Vaasu, Kunjunni Maashu, Choyi Moopan and Ammini decide to go. But when they reach London, they see that Chandran has not come to invite them at the Airport. They are left dumbfounded and find ways to survive in the foreign land without knowing English, until they meet Raghu, who falls in love with Ammini. Trouble begins when the owners of the house force all of them out of the house.

== Cast ==
- Sukumaran as Raghu
- Jagathy Sreekumar as Rasheed
- Nedumudi Venu as Vaasu Kumar
- Sankaradi as Kunjunni Maashu
- Bahadoor as Choyi Moopan
- Jalaja as Ammini
- Meena Ganesh
- Paravoor Bharathan as Kuttappan
- Kunchan as Postman Prabhakaran
- Philomina as Narayani
- Sathaar as Johny

== Soundtrack ==
The music was composed by Shyam and the lyrics were written by Sathyan Anthikad.

| No. | Song | Singers | Lyrics | Length (m:ss) |
|---|---|---|---|---|
| 1 | "Kandille Saayippe" | K. J. Yesudas | Sathyan Anthikad | |
| 2 | "Mounamohangal Niram Tharum" | S. Janaki | Sathyan Anthikad | |
