= Maram (film) =

- Directed by: Yusuf Ali Kechery
- Written by: N. P. Muhammed
- Produced by: Yusuf Ali Kechery
- Starring: Prem Nazir; Jayabharathi; KPAC Lalitha; Adoor Bhasi
- Edited by: M. S. Mani
- Music by: G. Devarajan
- Production company: Anjana Productions
- Distributed by: Anjana Productions
- Release date: 26 October 1973
- Country: India
- Language: Malayalam

Maram is a 1973 Indian Malayalam film, directed and produced by Yusuf Ali Kechery. The film stars Prem Nazir, Jayabharathi, KPAC Lalitha and Adoor Bhasi in the lead roles. The film had musical score by G. Devarajan.

== Cast ==
- Prem Nazir as Ibrahim
- Jayabharathi as Aamina
- K. P. Ummer as Khadar
- Nellikode Bhaskaran as Aymutti
- KPAC Lalitha as Janu
- Bahadoor as Mollakka
- Adoor Bhasi as Bappootti
- Philomina as Aaminas Mother
- T. S. Muthaiah as Nair
- Chowalloor Krishnankutty
- Nilambur Balan
- M. O. Devasya
- Abbas
- Kedamangalam Ali
- Metlda
- Sumathi
- Venkichan
- Hari Neendakara
- Vijayan Karanthur
- P.N.M Ali Koya
- Kanmanam
- Kumari Sathi
- P.K Shekar

== Soundtrack ==
The music was composed by G. Devarajan and the lyrics were written by Moinkutty Vaidyar and Yusufali Kechery.

No.	Song	Singers	Lyrics	Length (m:ss)
1	"Chithirathaale Panitha Koottil" (Bit)	P. Madhuri	Moinkutty Vaidyar	
2	"Elelayya Elelam"	K. J. Yesudas, P. Madhuri, Chorus	Yusufali Kechery	
3	"Eriyanaalaayallo" (V1)	K. J. Yesudas	Moinkutty Vaidyar	
4	"Eriyanaalaayallo" (V2)	C. A. Aboobacker	Moinkutty Vaidyar	
5	"Kallaayippuzha"	P. Susheela, P. Madhuri	Yusufali Kechery	
6	"Kandaarakkattummal"	P. Madhuri	Moinkutty Vaidyar	
7	"Maarimalar Choriyunna"	P. Madhuri	Yusufali Kechery	
8	"Monchathippenne"	Ayiroor Sadasivan	Yusufali Kechery	
9	"Pathinaalam Raavudichathu"	K. J. Yesudas	Yusufali Kechery	
