= Nagaram Sagaram =

- Directed by: K. P. Pillai
- Written by: Sreekumaran Thampi
- Screenplay by: Sreekumaran Thampi
- Produced by: K. P. Pillai
- Starring: Sukumari; KPAC Lalitha; Adoor Bhasi; Thikkurissy Sukumaran Nair
- Cinematography: E. N. Balakrishnan
- Edited by: K. Sankunni
- Music by: G. Devarajan
- Production company: Thrupthi Films
- Distributed by: Thrupthi Films
- Release date: 28 June 1974
- Country: India
- Language: Malayalam

Nagaram Sagaram is a 1974 Indian Malayalam-language film, directed and produced by K. P. Pillai. The film stars Sukumari, KPAC Lalitha, Adoor Bhasi and Thikkurissy Sukumaran Nair. The film had musical score by G. Devarajan.

== Cast ==
- Sukumari
- KPAC Lalitha
- Adoor Bhasi
- Thikkurissy Sukumaran Nair
- Sreelatha Namboothiri
- Raghavan
- Bahadoor
- Sumithra

== Soundtrack ==
The music was composed by G. Devarajan and the lyrics were written by Sreekumaran Thampi.

No.	Song	Singers	Lyrics	Length (m:ss)
1	"Chanchalamizhi"	P. Jayachandran	Sreekumaran Thampi	
2	"Ente Hridayam"	P. Madhuri	Sreekumaran Thampi	
3	"Jeevithamaam Saagarathil"	K. J. Yesudas	Sreekumaran Thampi	
4	"Ponnonakkili"	Ambili	Sreekumaran Thampi	
5	"Thennalin Chundil"	P. Jayachandran, P. Madhuri	Sreekumaran Thampi	
