= Dharmayudham =

- Directed by: A. Vincent
- Written by: V. T. Nandakumar
- Screenplay by: V. T. Nandakumar
- Starring: Prem Nazir; Srividya; Kaviyoor Ponnamma; Adoor Bhasi
- Cinematography: Soorya Prakash
- Edited by: G. Venkittaraman
- Music by: G. Devarajan
- Production company: Karthika Films
- Distributed by: Karthika Films
- Release date: 21 September 1973
- Country: India
- Language: Malayalam

Dharmayudham is a 1973 Indian Malayalam-language film directed by A. Vincent. The film stars Prem Nazir, Srividya, Kaviyoor Ponnamma and Adoor Bhasi in the lead roles. The film has musical score by G. Devarajan.

== Cast ==
- Prem Nazir as Kochaniyan
- Nanditha Bose (dubbed by KPAC Lalitha)
- Srividya as Sridevi
- Kaviyoor Ponnamma
- Adoor Bhasi
- P. J. Antony
- Paravoor Bharathan
- Bahadoor
- Kottarakkara Sreedharan Nair
- S. P. Pillai
- Rony Vincent
- Philomina as Narayani
- Oduvil Unnikrishnan as Avarachan

== Soundtrack ==
The music was composed by G. Devarajan and the lyrics were written by P. Bhaskaran and G. Kumarapilla.

No.	Song	Singers	Lyrics	Length (m:ss)
1	"Dukhathin Kaippuneer"	P. Jayachandran	P. Bhaskaran	
2	"Kaamukahrithil Kavitha"	P. Madhuri	G. Kumarapilla	
3	"Mangalaam Kaavile"	P. Jayachandran, P. Madhuri, Kaviyoor Ponnamma	P. Bhaskaran	
4	"Praananadha Enikku"	Ayiroor Sadasivan	P. Bhaskaran	
5	"Sankalpa Mandapathil"	P. Jayachandran	P. Bhaskaran	
6	"Smarikkan Padippicha"	P. Susheela	P. Bhaskaran	
7	"Thrichevadikal"	P. Susheela	P. Bhaskaran	
