= Paathira Sooryan =

- VCD cover
- Directed by: K. P. Pillai
- Written by: Sreekumaran Thampi
- Screenplay by: Sreekumaran Thampi
- Produced by: C. K. Prabhakaran Padiyathu
- Starring: Prem Nazir; Jayabharathi; Srividya; M. G. Soman
- Cinematography: U. Rajagopal
- Edited by: M. N. Appu
- Music by: V. Dakshinamoorthy
- Production company: Bhagyadeepam Pictures
- Distributed by: Bhagyadeepam Pictures
- Release date: 3 July 1981
- Country: India
- Language: Malayalam

Paathira Sooryan (transl. Midnight Sun) is a 1981 Indian Malayalam-language film directed by K. P. Pillai and produced by C. K. Prabhakaran Padiyathu. The film stars Prem Nazir, Jayabharathi, Srividya and M. G. Soman. The film has musical score by V. Dakshinamoorthy.

== Cast ==
- Prem Nazir as James/Alexander George
- Jayabharathi as Radha
- Srividya as Jolly
- M. G. Soman as Stephen
- Adoor Bhasi as Papachan
- Kalpana as Friend of Jolly (Srividya)
- Prameela as Ayisha
- T. R. Omana as Devaki Amma
- Prathapachandran as Mathai
- Sathaar as Basheer
- Baby Sangeetha as Sweety Mol
- Jayamalini as Dancer
- Vanchiyoor Madhavan Nair
- K. J. Yesudas as A Saint

== Soundtrack ==
The music was composed by V. Dakshinamoorthy with lyrics by Sreekumaran Thampi.

No.	Song	Singers	Lyrics	Length (m:ss)
1	"Idavazhiyil"	K. J. Yesudas, Ambili	Sreekumaran Thampi	
2	"Ilam Manjin"	Vani Jairam	Sreekumaran Thampi	
3	"Jeevithame Ha Jeevithame"	K. J. Yesudas	Sreekumaran Thampi	
4	"Paathira Sooryanudichu"	K. J. Yesudas	Sreekumaran Thampi	
5	"Sougandhikangale Vidaruvin"	K. J. Yesudas	Sreekumaran Thampi	
6	"Sougandhikangale Vidaruvin"	P. Jayachandran	Sreekumaran Thampi	
