= Orukkam =

- DVD Cover
- Directed by: K. Madhu
- Written by: Balachandran Chullikkadu (story); John Paul (screenplay)
- Starring: Suresh Gopi; Ranjini; Murali
- Cinematography: Ashok Kumar
- Edited by: V. P. Krishnan
- Music by: Johnson
- Release date: 1990
- Country: India
- Language: Malayalam

Orukkam (Preparation) is a 1990 Malayalam-language thriller film produced by Akshaya films, directed by K. Madhu and written by John Paul. The film stars Suresh Gopi, Ranjini and Murali in the lead roles. The film also features Lalu Alex, Vijayraghavan and Sai Kumar in supporting roles. The film also features original songs composed by Johnson, while cinematography was handled by Ashok Kumar. This story revolves around Mumbai henchman to assign to kill a lady. The film became average hit at the box office.

== Plot ==
The film starts with Sethumadhava Kurup a.k.a. Sethu returning to his village in Kuttanadu after long years. He meets his old teacher, Kumaran master, and informs him that he was running a hotel in Punjab but lost everything in the riots there. He opens a small tea-shop in the village. There, he meets his old flame Bhaagi, who is now married and settled. He also meets his uncle Koyikal Madhava Kurup, who was responsible for his fleeing from the village and losing his girl. He had returned to take revenge on his uncle, but by that time, his uncle had already lost all his wealth. In the village, he also becomes friends with Anthrappayi and Paramu. His happy second life in the village ends one night with the arrival of Chandru from Bombay. It was revealed that Sethu was actually a henchman of Chandru in Bombay. Chandru asked him to take one more assignment, and else he will reveal Sethu's real past to the villagers. Sethu had no choice but to take up the assignment and started to Kodaikanal.

In Kodaikanal, he stays with Ramu, who was an old associate of his in Bombay. Sethu's assignment was to kill Radha, who teaches in a boarding school in Kodaikanal managed by Fr. Francis Arackal. One night Sethu goes to murder Radha, but is shocked to find her trying to commit suicide. Sethu instead saves her life and tries to found out who wants to kill her. Sethu understands that the person who wants to finish off Radha is actually Narayan Mehta, who is the boss of Chandru and Ramu. Narayan Mehta earlier married Radha as Narayanankutty for her money, but later left her and made her believe that he died in an accident in Dubai. Radha met Narayanankutty, who is now a big businessman called Narayan Mehta, in Kodaikanal. Narayan Mehta orders Chandru to have Radha killed, to prevent his secrets from getting revealed. The cruel Mehta also destroyed the life of Kausalya by killing her rich father, grabbing all her wealth, and reducing her to his handicapped wife in a wheelchair. Sethu develops sympathy towards Radha, falls in love with her, and decides to protect her from Chandru and Narayan Mehta with the help of Ramu and Freddy.

They ended up having an open fight, and Chandru was killed by Ramu, who in turn was killed by Narayan Mehta. Sethu and Radha were chased by Narayan Mehta, and finally, Sethu kills Mehta with the help of Freddy, who also dies in the attempt. The film ends with Sethu being taken by the police, with Fr. Francis assuring him of getting acquitted considering the circumstances leading to the murder and Mehta's criminal past.

== Cast ==
- Suresh Gopi as Sethumadhava Kurup aka Sethu
- Ranjini as Radha
- Murali as Chandru
- Lalu Alex as Narayan Mehta / Narayanankutty
- Vijayaraghavan as Ramu
- Sai Kumar as Freddy
- Sithara as Bhaagi
- Parvathy as Kousalya
- Jose Prakash as Fr. Francis Arackal
- Jagathy Sreekumar as Anthappayi
- Kalpana as Alice, Anthappayi's Wife
- Bahadoor as Kumaran Master, Sethu's Mentor
- M. S. Thripunithura as Koyikal Madhava Kurup, Sethu's Uncle and Bhaagi's Father
- Mamukkoya as Paramu
- Prem Prakash as Kuttikrishnan, Bhaagi's Husband
- Dalip Tahil as Andrews, Freddy's Father
- Alummoodan as Member Bhargavan Pillai
- Philomina as Paruthalla, Paramu's Mother
- Meena as Kamalamma, Bhargavan Pillai's Wife
