= Ahalya (1978 film) =

1978 film directed by Babu Nanthankode

- Directed by: Babu Nanthankode
- Written by: Alappuzha Karthikeyan
- Screenplay by: Alappuzha Karthikeyan
- Starring: Sheela; Prathapachandran; Aranmula Ponnamma; Balan K Nair
- Cinematography: Jagadeesh
- Music by: K. J. Joy; Lyrics: Bichu Thirumala
- Production company: Alli Arts
- Distributed by: Alli Arts
- Release date: 26 May 1978
- Country: India
- Language: Malayalam

Ahalya is a 1978 Indian Malayalam film, directed by Babu Nanthankode. The film stars Sheela, Prathapachandran, Aranmula Ponnamma and Balan K. Nair in the lead roles. It features a musical score by KJ Joy.

== Cast ==
- Sheela
- Prathapachandran
- Aranmula Ponnamma
- Balan K. Nair
- Latha
- Nagaraj

== Soundtrack ==
The music was composed by K. J. Joy, with the lyrics written by Bichu Thirumala.

No.	Song	Singers	Length (m:ss)
1	"Happy Music"	S. Janaki, B. Vasantha	
2	"Lalithaa Sahasranamam"	S. Janaki, Chorus	
3	"Sreebhootha Bali"	K. J. Yesudas	
4	"Vellathaamarayithalazhako"	K. J. Yesudas	
