= Nanditha Bose =

Indian actress in Malayalam movies

- Occupation: Actress
- Years active: 1962–present
- Awards: Filmfare Award

Nanditha Bose is an Indian actress who is known for her work in Malayalam films. One of the prominent actresses during the 1970s, she received a Filmfare Award for her performance in Swapnam (1973). She is also known for her performance in films such as Achaani (1973), Panitheeratha Veedu (1973) and Dharmayudham (1973). Currently, she is working in television serials.

== Personal life ==
Nanditha is from Bengal, India. She was married to D. P. Bose, but the marriage ended in divorce. The couple has a son, Debasis Bose and a daughter, Debarati (née) Bose.

=== Awards ===
- 1973; Filmfare Award for Best Actress - Swapnam

== Filmography ==
=== Malayalam ===
- Panitheeratha Veedu (1973) as Rachel
- Chenda (1973)
- Achaani (1973) as Seetha
- Dharmayudham (1973) as Meenu
- Swapnam (1973) as Gauri
- Chanchala (1974)
- Poonthenaruvi (1974) as Valsamma
- Prayanam (1975)
- Kaamam Krodham Moham (1975)
- Vazhivilakku (1976)
- Aparaadhi (1977)
- Akale Aakaasham (1977)
- Agninakshathram (1977)
- Sujatha (1977)
- Etho Oru Swapnam (1978)
- Nakshathrangale Kaaval (1978)
- Simhasanam (1979) as Savithri
- Enikku Njaan Swantham (1979) as Leela
- Iniyaathra (1979)
- Angadi (1980)
- Cheppu (1987)
- Air Hostess (1980) as Kamala
- Thadavara (1981) as Nandini
- Valarthumrigangal (1981) as Lakshmi
- Manassinte Theerthayaathra (1981)
- Maniyan Pilla Adhava Maniyan Pilla (1981) as Padmam
- Kaahalam (1981)
- Parvathy (1981) as Subadra Bhai
- Odukkam Thudakkam (1982)
- Kelkkaatha Shabdam (1982)
- Beedikunjamma (1982) as Susheela
- Chiriyo Chiri (1982)
- Kelkkaatha Sabdham (1982) as Jeyanthi's Mother
- Manju (1983)
- Parasparam (1983)
- NH 47 (1984) as Sumathi
- Paavam Krooran (1984)
- Ithramathram (1986) as Sharada
- Neram Pularumpol (1986)
- Ithrayum Kaalam (1987) as Mariya
- Oozham (1988)
- Isabella (1988) as Maggie
- Kalpana House (1989)
- Paithrukam (1993)
- Ashwaroodan (2006)

=== Tamil ===
- Dhakam (1972) as Sharada
- Oru Kudumbathin Kathai (1975) as Anandhi
- Ganga Yamuna Kaveri (1978) as Kaveri
- Savithiri (1980) as Meenakshi

=== Bengali ===
- Kanna (1962)
- Nidhiram Sardar (1976)
- Pankhiraj (1980)

=== Hindi ===
- Aisa Bhi Hota Hain (1971)
- Dil Kaa Heera (1979)

=== Kannada ===
- Punardatta (1976)
- Mother (1980)

== Controversy ==
Nanditha went to the High Court for her case following years of enduring severe physical and mental abuse at her home since 2002. She has also raised concerns about her husband's (D. P. Bose) inappropriate closeness to a teenage girl. At first, D P Bose stated that Lipika Mondal was a maid servant. However, he later changed his story, asserting that Mondal was actually married to his son, Debasis Bose. Later, her son informed the court that he had not married Lipika.
