= Ragging (film) =

- Directed by: N. N. Pisharady
- Written by: K.A Poulose; N. N. Pisharady (dialogues)
- Screenplay by: N. N. Pisharady
- Produced by: Adv. Issac Thomas, Eralil, N. Paravoor
- Starring: P. J. Antony; Sankaradi; Balan K Nair; Jameela Malik
- Cinematography: Ramachandra Babu
- Edited by: G. Venkittaraman
- Music by: M. K. Arjunan
- Production company: Harisree Productions
- Distributed by: Harisree Productions
- Release date: 22 February 1973
- Country: India
- Language: Malayalam

Ragging is a 1973 Indian Malayalam film, directed by N. N. Pisharady. The film stars P. J. Antony, Sankaradi, Balan K. Nair and Jameela Malik in the lead roles. The film had musical score by M. K. Arjunan.

== Cast ==
- P. J. Antony
- Sankaradi
- Balan K. Nair
- Jameela Malik
- Rani Chandra
- Sudheer
- Vincent

== Soundtrack ==
The music was composed by M. K. Arjunan and the lyrics were written by P. J. Antony and Isaac Thomas.

No.	Song	Singers	Lyrics	Length (m:ss)
1	"Aadithyananayum"	P. Jayachandran, Chorus, Thoppil Anto	P. J. Antony	
2	"Aakaashagangayil Njaanorikkal"	S. Janaki	P. J. Antony	
3	"Manohari Manohari"	K. J. Yesudas	P. J. Antony	
4	"Sneha Swaroopanaam"	P. Jayachandran, P. Madhuri	Isaac Thomas	
