= Ninamaninja Kalpadukal =

- Directed by: N. N. Pisharady
- Written by: Parappurathu
- Screenplay by: Parappurathu
- Produced by: N.K. Karunakara Pillai, Sobhana Parameswaran Nair
- Starring: Prem Nazir; Madhu; Sheela; Ambika
- Cinematography: U. Rajagopal
- Edited by: G. Venkittaraman
- Music by: M. S. Baburaj
- Production company: Navarathna Productions
- Distributed by: Navarathna Productions
- Release date: 22 February 1963
- Country: India
- Language: Malayalam
- Box office: ₹60 lakhs

Ninamaninja Kalpadukal (Bloodstained Footprints) is a 1963 Malayalam language film, directed by N. N. Pisharody and produced by N.K. Karunakara Pillai and Shobhana Parameswaran Nair. The lead role is played by Prem Nazir, with Ambika, Sheela and Madhu, who debuted with this film. The film is based on a novel by Parappurath and portrays the trials the Indo-China war. It won the National Film Award for Best Feature Film in Malayalam. It was a super hit movie.

Songs in the film include "Mamalakalkkappurathu" (by P. B. Sreenivas) and "Anuraga Natakathil" (by K. P. Udayabhanu). The songs were composed by Baburaj, with lyrics by P. Bhaskaran.

== Cast ==
- Prem Nazir as Thankachan
- Madhu as Stephen
- Sheela as Ammini
- Ambika as Thankamma
- Adoor Bhasi as Subramaniam Potti
- Kottayam Santha as Lissy
- P. J. Antony as Thankamma's Husband
- Adoor Bhavani as Rahel
- Bahadoor as Mammoonju
- Kambissery Karunakaran as Thomachan
- Kedamangalam Ali
- P. O. Thomas
- Radhamani
- P. Susheela as Dancer
- S. P. Pillai as Bomb Kunjoonju
- R. Nambiath
- Nanukuttan Nair
- M.G Mathew
- Omanakuttan
- Vaidyanathan
- Baby
- Kuryakose
- Mavelikkara Ponnamma
- Santhakumary
- Baby Shibha
- Lakshmi Devi

== Soundtrack ==
The music was composed by M. S. Baburaj and the lyrics were written by P. Bhaskaran.

No.	Song	Singers	Lyrics	Length (m:ss)
1	"Anuraaganaadakathin"	K. P. Udayabhanu	P. Bhaskaran	
2	"Bhaarathamedini Potti Valarthiya"	M. S. Baburaj, P. B. Sreenivas	P. Bhaskaran	
3	"Iniyaare Thirayunnu"	P. Leela	P. Bhaskaran	
4	"Ithumaathram Ithumaathram"	P. Leela	P. Bhaskaran	
5	"Kanyaathanayaa"	P. Leela, Punitha	P. Bhaskaran	
6	"Maamalakalkkapurathu"	P. B. Sreenivas	P. Bhaskara	
7	"Main To Ghunguru"	S. Janaki	Meera Bhajan	
8	"Padinjaare Maanathulla"	P. Leela, P. B. Sreenivas	P. Bhaskaran	

== Box office ==
The film became commercial success, and highest grossing Malayalam film at that time collecting ₹60 lakhs from box office.
