= N. N. Pisharody =

Indian film director (1926–2008)

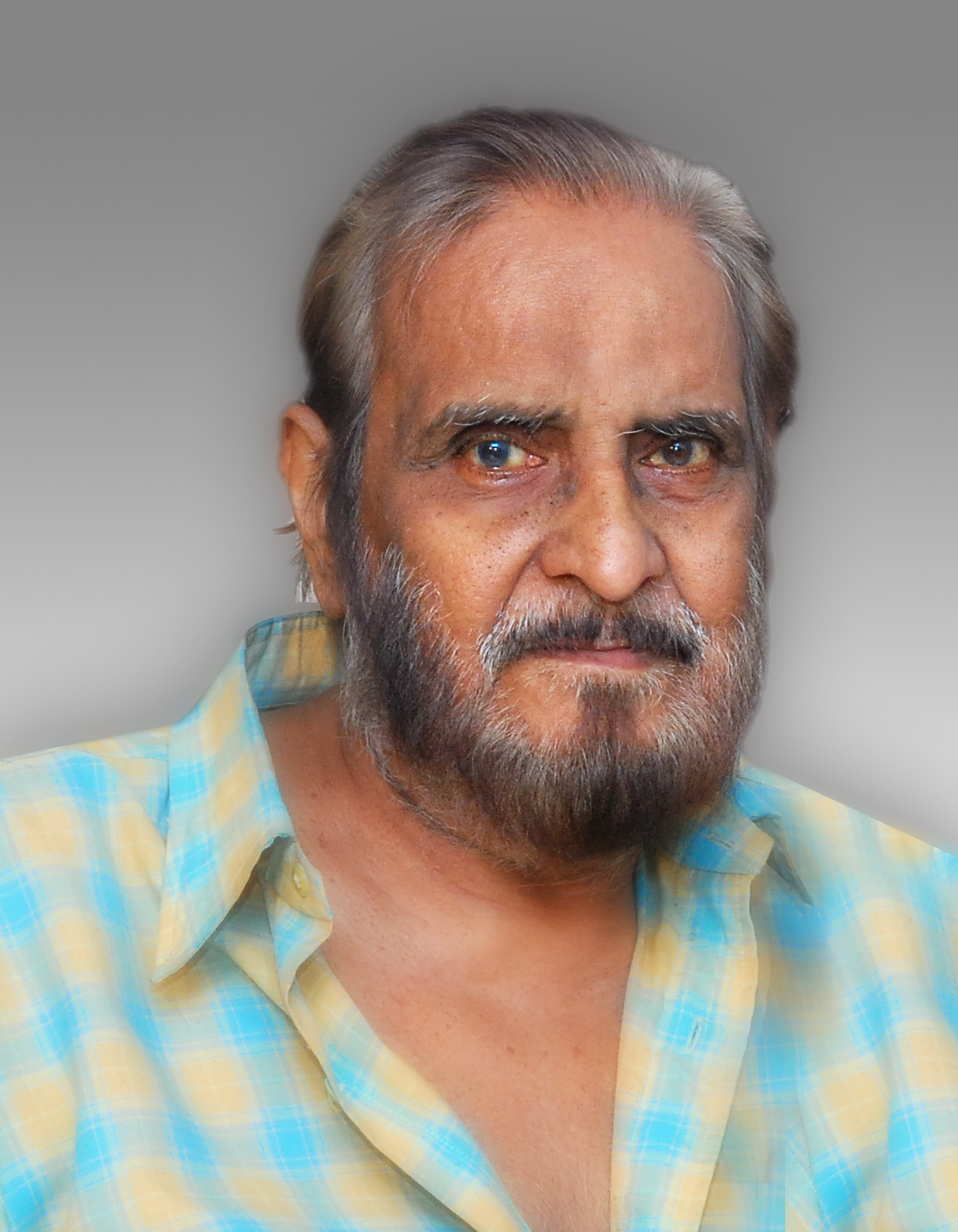
- N. N. Pisharody
- Born: 1926; Methala, near Perumbavoor in Kerala, India
- Died: 30 August 2008 (aged 81–82); Radha Niwas, Kanjoor, India
- Occupations: Writer, Director, Producer
- Awards: State Awards for Film & Drama

N. N. Pisharody (or Pisharady) (1926 – 30 August 2008) was a director in the Malayalam Film industry. He was born into a feudal family, known as "Kallil" in Methala, near Perumbavoor in Kerala.

== Biography ==
Born into a family known as "Kallil" in Methala, Near Kalady in Kerala, he completed his schooling in Paravoor and then was graduated in economics from Serhampur, Bengal. He was an avid reader always and appreciated the nuances of literature. His first short story was published in the weekly Prasanna Keralam from Kottayam when he was studying in high school. Since then, his stories have appeared in weeklies.

=== Writing career ===
One of his first of his short stories was published in the weekly Prasanna Keralam from Kottayam, when he was studying in high school.

The editor of Kaumudi, K Balakrishnan, lead him to writing novels; the first one named Kure Swapnangal, Kure Vanambadigal (Lot of dreams, Lot of nightingales) was published in Kaumudi weekly. Later on most of the magazines like Janayugam, Navayugam, Keralashabdam, Chithrapournnami, Express (Weekly), Mathrubhoomi (Weekly) frequently published his novels. During his career, he wrote 17 novels, of which 8 have been printed as books. One of the novels Vellam (Water) has even inspired a movie.

He took a break from writing to try his hand in the film industry where he found a new platform to tell his stories. Recently he had taken up writing again for the Mathrubhoomi weekly – a story titled Aandal Puram Pogum Vazhi (En route to Aandal Puram). Shree Books, Aluwa has published this story as a book. He also wrote the screen play for about 40 dramatic plays for Aakashavani Thrissur. He wrote screenplays for the following too – Hiranya Garbham, Sarppa Sathram, Ivideyo Naalathe Sooryodayam, Vishathan Kaavilinnarattu - each of these plays were meant for various art groups. His famous novels are Virunnusala & Vellam.

He was unmarried and a resident of Radha Niwas, Kanjoor. He died on 30 August 2008.

=== Film career ===
His association with film industry lasted 30 years. Starting as an assistant director for Tamil - Telugu movies in Newton Studios, he later distinguished himself as a producer, director and scriptwriter. His directorial debut, Ninamaninja Kalpadukal, which portrays the trials the Indo-China war, won 4 awards including the President's silver medal for best regional film, and the award for The Best Director. He directed about 6 movies and produced 2 movies on his own. He wrote the screen play and directed 4 episodes of Aithihyamala for Doordarshan. He also directed a tele-film titled Kudajadri.

== Filmography ==
Name	Year
Ninamaninja Kalpadukal	1963
Mulkkireedom	
Ragging	1973
Kanikkonna	
Mutthu	
Ammu	
