= Achani =

- VCD cover
- Directed by: A. Vincent
- Screenplay by: Thoppil Bhasi
- Story by: Karaikudi Narayanan
- Produced by: K. Ravindran Nair
- Starring: Prem Nazir; Nanditha Bose; Adoor Bhasi; Sankaradi; Kottarakkara Sreedharan Nair
- Cinematography: Venkit; Prakash
- Edited by: G. Venkitaraman
- Music by: G. Devarajan
- Production company: General Pictures
- Release date: 12 July 1973
- Country: India
- Language: Malayalam

Achani (Accāṇi, transl. Axle) is a 1973 Indian Malayalam-language film, directed by A. Vincent and produced by K. Ravindran Nair. The film stars Prem Nazir, Nanditha Bose, Adoor Bhasi and Kottarakkara Sreedharan Nair. It tells the story of a tailor and the trials and tribulations of his family. The film was a commercial success and the proceeds from the film was donated by the producer for the construction of a Quilon Public Library in Quilon, Kerala. The film was adapted from the Tamil stage play of same name written by Karaikudi Narayanan.

== Cast ==
- Prem Nazir as Vasu
- Nanditha Bose as Seetha
- Adoor Bhasi as Kaimal
- Sankaradi as Banker Menon
- Kottarakkara Sreedharan Nair as Raghavan Muthalali
- Bahadoor as Appu
- Vincent as Gopi
- Sudheer as Babu
- Sujatha as Uma
- Meena as Srimathi Raghavan
- Philomina as Mariammam
- Sreelatha as Kalyani
- Master Sathyajith
- Master Prasad
- K. J. Yesudas (Guest appearance as himself)
- John Varghees
- J.A.R Anand
- Ramankutty Nair
- Raghava Menon
- Aravindhakshan
- Vijaya

== Soundtrack ==
The music was composed by G. Devarajan, with lyrics by P. Bhaskaran. The songs of the film were hits during the time, especially "Ente Swapnathin", sung playback and on screen by K. J. Yesudas.

Song	Singer(s)
"Ente Swapnathin"	K. J. Yesudas
"Mallikabaanan Thante"	P. Jayachandran; P. Madhuri
"Manivilakkananju"	P. Susheela
"Neela Neela Samudra"	P. Madhuri
"Samayamaam Nadi"	P. Susheela
