= Ammu (1965 film) =

- Directed by: N. N. Pisharady
- Written by: P. A. Warrior
- Screenplay by: P. A. Warrior
- Produced by: M. Kesavan
- Starring: Sathyan; Madhu; Sukumari; Adoor Bhasi
- Cinematography: Kutty Pollekkad
- Music by: M. S. Baburaj
- Production company: Vasanthichithra
- Release date: 7 May 1965
- Country: India
- Language: Malayalam

Ammu is a 1965 Indian Malayalam-language film, directed by N. N. Pisharady and produced by M. Kesavan. The film stars Ambika in the eponymous role along with Sathyan, Madhu, Sukumari and Adoor Bhasi in pivotal roles. It marked actress Sujatha Menon’s debut in the industry.

== Cast ==
- Sathyan as Shekharan
- Madhu as Bhasi
- Sukumari as Saro
- Adoor Bhasi as Achummaavan
- Omanakuttan
- P. K. Saraswathi as Kalyaniyamma
- Prem Nawas as Appu
- Ambika as Ammu
- Baby Saru as Thankam
- Indira Thampi as Ammini
- Kaduvakulam Antony as Anthonimaappila
- Kedamangalam Ali
- Master Ajit Kumar
- Premji as Shankunni Nair
- Sujatha as Sharadha

== Soundtrack ==
The music was composed by M. S. Baburaj and the lyrics were written by Yusufali Kechery.

Song	Singers
"Aattinakkare Aalinkombile"	Thankam Thampi
"Ambili Mama Vaa Vaa"	P. Susheela
"Konchikkonchi"	S. Janaki, K. P. Udayabhanu
"Kunjippenninu"	S. Janaki, L. R. Eeswari, M. S. Baburaj, Machad Vasanthi, Chandrasekharan Thambi
"Maayakkaara Manivarnna"	P. Leela
"Pulliyuduppittu Konchikkuzhayunna"	Thankam Thampi
"Thedunnathaare"	S. Janaki
"Thudikottippaadaam"	K. P. Udayabhanu, Thankam Thampi
