= Oru Sayahnathinte Swapnam =

- Directed by: Bharathan
- Written by: John Paul Puthusery
- Screenplay by: John Paul Puthusery
- Starring: Suhasini; Madhu; Mukesh; Nedumudi Venu
- Cinematography: Vasanth Kumar
- Edited by: Bharathan
- Music by: Ouseppachan
- Production company: Noble Pictures
- Distributed by: Noble Pictures
- Release date: 1989
- Country: India
- Language: Malayalam

Oru Sayahnathinte Swapnam is a 1989 Indian Malayalam film, directed by Bharathan. The film stars Suhasini, Madhu, Mukesh and Nedumudi Venu. The film has musical score by Ouseppachan.

== Plot ==
The film tells the story of the inmates of an old age home called Snehalayam and Captain Alice Cherian, who comes there for work.

== Cast ==
- Suhasini as Capt. Alice Cherian
- Madhu as Brigadier R. K. Menon
- Mukesh as Roy Mathew
- Nedumudi Venu as Dr. Kuriakose
- Jagathi Sreekumar as Stephan
- Thikkurisi Sukumaran Nair as Govinda Pillai
- Sankaradi as Pisharadi
- Bahadoor as Kunju Krishna Kaimal
- Kalpana as Thankamani
- Kaviyoor Ponnamma as Mariamma
- Adoor Bhawani as Veronica
- Aranmula Ponnamma as Saraswathiamma
- Philomina
- Meena
- Ravi Vallathol as Kunju Krishna Kaimal's son

== Soundtrack ==
The music was composed by Ouseppachan.

No.	Song	Singers	Lyrics	Length (m:ss)
1	"Ariyaatha Doorathilenguninno"	K. S. Chithra	O. N. V. Kurup	
2	"Ariyaatha Doorathilenguninno"	K. S. Chithra, M. G. Sreekumar	O. N. V. Kurup	
3	"Kaanana Chaayakal"	K. S. Chithra	O. N. V. Kurup	
4	"Mukilukal Mooli"	M. G. Sreekumar	O. N. V. Kurup	
5	"Nilaavum Kinaavum"	M. G. Sreekumar	O. N. V. Kurup	
