= Rajakokila =

Indian actress

- Occupation: Film actor
- Years active: 1966-1980

Rajakokila was an Indian actress. She was a prominent lead actress during the 1970s in Malayalam, Tamil, Kannada, and Telugu films. She was well noted for her glamorous roles. She is married to Crossbelt Mani. The actress Meena is her niece.

== Partial filmography ==
Year	Film	Role	Language	Notes
1966	Motor Sundaram Pillai		Tamil	Debut Film
1966	Pakalkkinavu	Shari	Malayalam	
1968	Kodungallooramma		Malayalam	
1968	Yakshi	Chandran's Wife	Malayalam	
1968	Chakkaram		Tamil	
1970	Thedi Vandha Mappillai	Radha	Malayalam	
1971	Oru Thai Makkal		Tamil	
1972	Ganga		Tamil	
1972	Agathiyar		Tamil	
1972	Velli Vizha		Tamil	
1972	Dhakam		Tamil	
1973	Panchavadi		Malayalam	
1973	Thekkankaattu		Malayalam	
1973	Manipayal		Tamil	
1974	Nadeenadanmaare Aavasyamundu		Malayalam	
1974	Thumbolaarcha		Malayalam	
1974	Durga		Malayalam	
1974	Dhaagam		Tamil	
1975	Velicham Akale		Malayalam	
1975	Pennpada		Malayalam	
1975	Kuttichaathan		Malayalam	
1975	Paalazhi Madhanam		Malayalam	
1975	Dharmakshethre Kurukshethre		Malayalam	
1975	Kalyaanappanthal		Malayalam	
1975	Sooryavamsham		Malayalam	
1975	Thaamarathoni		Malayalam	
1975	Enga Pattan Sothu		Tamil	
1976	Chottanikkara Amma		Malayalam	
1976	Yudhabhoomi		Malayalam	
1976	Kuttavum Shikshayum		Malayalam	
1976	Ore Thandhai		Tamil	
1976	Ninaipadhu Niraiverum		Tamil	
1977	Penpuli		Malayalam	
1977	Anjali		Malayalam	
1977	Jagadguru Aadisankaran		Malayalam	
1977	Pallavi		Malayalam	
1978	Ee Manoharatheeram		Malayalam	
