= Aadyakiranangal =

1964 film

- Directed by: P. Bhaskaran
- Screenplay by: Thoppil Bhasi
- Story by: K. E. Mathai
- Produced by: P. Bhaskaran; V. Abdulla
- Starring: Sathyan; Madhu; Ambika; K. R. Vijaya
- Cinematography: U. Rajagopal
- Edited by: R. Venkattaraman
- Music by: K. Raghavan
- Production company: Chithra Sagar
- Distributed by: Chithra Sagar
- Release date: 30 September 1964
- Country: India
- Language: Malayalam

Aadyakiranangal (transl. First Rays of Light) is a 1964 Indian Malayalam-language film, directed and produced by P. Bhaskaran. The film stars Sathyan, Madhu, Ambika and K. R. Vijaya, with music by K. Raghavan. The film won National Film Award for Best Feature Film in Malayalam. It was based on a novel by K. E. Mathai.

== Cast ==
- Sathyan as Kunjukutty
- Madhu as Pappachan
- Ambika as Gracy
- K. R. Vijaya as Marykutty
- Adoor Bhasi as Krishnan Ashan
- Jose Prakash as Damodaran
- P. J. Antony as Kariyachan
- T. R. Omana as Pennukunju
- Gopi
- Thoppil Bhasi as Pulayan
- Adoor Pankajam as Kunjeli
- Bahadoor as Velu
- Elizabeth as Eliyamma
- Haji Abdul Rahman as Appukuttan
- Kambissery Karunakaran as Kuttichan
- Kedamangalam Ali as Kuriachan
- Kunjandi as Paappi
- Kuthiravattam Pappu
- Master Ajith P Bhaskaran as Joyimon
- Philomina as Annamma
- S. P. Pillai as Avaran
- Sunny as Sunny
- Vasu Pradeep as Thevan

== Soundtrack ==
The music was composed by K. Raghavan and the lyrics were written by P. Bhaskaran. Background music was composed by M. B. Sreenivasan.

Song	Singers	Length (m:ss)
"Aanachaal Naattilulla"	Adoor Bhasi, Chorus, Kuthiravattam Pappu	01:14
"Bhaarathamennaal"	P. Susheela, Chorus	03:06
"Car Lorreel Keri"	Adoor Bhasi	00:14
"Kallupaalathil Kariyaachan"	Adoor Bhasi	00:41
"Kalyaanamothiram"	P. Leela	03:25
"Kannoor Dharmadam"	Adoor Bhasi, Chorus	00:50
"Kizhakkudikkile"	A. P. Komala	03:04
"Malamoottil Ninnoru"	K. J. Yesudas	02:54
"Manjulabhaashini Baale"	Adoor Bhasi	00:54
"Oonjaale Ponnoonjaale"	P. Leela	03:20
"Pathivaayi Pournami"	P. Susheela	04:21
"Shanka Vittu Varunnallo"	Adoor Bhasi	00:48
