= A. Raghunath =

Malayalam film producer

A. Raghunath is a Malayalam film producer.

== Career ==
He works in the Malayalam film industry. He produced at least 16 films. His career started with Thurakkatha Vathil in 1970. His last known film is Adhyayam Onnu Muthal (1985).

== Films produced ==
no	Film	year	Director
1	Thurakkatha Vathil	1970	P. Bhaskaran
