= Aranazhika Neram =

1970 film

Ara Nazhika Neram
- Directed by: K. S. Sethumadhavan
- Screenplay by: Parappurath
- Based on: Ara Nazhika Neram by Parappurath
- Produced by: M. O. Joseph
- Starring: Kottarakkara; Prem Nazir; Sathyan; K. P. Ummer; Adoor Bhasi; Ragini; Sheela; Ambika Sukumaran
- Cinematography: Melli Irani
- Music by: G. Devarajan
- Release date: 25 December 1970
- Country: India
- Language: Malayalam

Ara Nazhika Neram (Half nazhika or 12 minutes) is a 1970 Malayalam film, directed by K. S. Sethumadhavan and written by Parappurath, based on his own novel Ara Nazhika Neram. Parappurath also played a minor role in the film. The story of the film revolves around an Orthodox Christian family headed by Kunjenachan (Kottarakkara Sreedharan Nair), a ninety-year-old patriarch who lives his life by the book. The film also features Prem Nazir, Sathyan, Ragini, Sheela, K. P. Ummer, Adoor Bhasi and Ambika Sukumaran.

== Cast ==
- Kottarakkara Sreedharan Nair as Kunjonachan Mappila
- Sathyan as Mathukutty, Kunjonachan's 5th Son
- Prem Nazir as Rajan, Maathukutty's Son
- Ragini as Deenamma, Mathukutty's Wife
- Sheela as Santhamma, Rajan's Wife
- Sankaradi as Geevarghese, Kunjonachan's Elder Son
- Ambika Sukumaran as Kuttiamma, Daughter of Geevargheese
- Adoor Bhasi as Sivarama Kurup
- K. P. Ummer as Thomas, Kuttiamma's husband
- Bahadur as Kunju Cherukkan, Kunjonachan's 3rd Son
- N. Govindan Kutty as Philippose, Kunjonachan's 4th Son
- Meena as Annamma, Wife of Philippose
- Jeassy as Danny, Kunjucherukkan's Son
- Jose Prakash as Priest
- Muthukulam Raghavan Pilla as Lonaan, Kunjonachan's old friend

== Soundtrack ==
All lyrics are written by Vayalar Ramavarma except where noted; all music is composed by G. Devarajan.

No.	Title	Lyrics	Artist(s)	Length
1.	"Anupame Azhake"		K. J. Yesudas
2.	"Chippi Chippi"		C. O. Anto, Latha Raju
3.	"Daivaputhranu"		P. Susheela
4.	"Samayamaam Radhathil"	Volbrecht Nagel & Vayalar Ramavarma	P. Leela, P. Madhuri
5.	"Swarangale Sapthaswarangale"		P. Leela

== Awards ==
Kerala State Film Awards (1970)

- Best Director - K. S. Sethumadhavan
- Best Story - Parappurath
- Best Actor - Kottarakkara Sreedharan Nair
