= Kannankottai =

- village
- Location in Tamil Nadu, India Kannankottai (India)
- Coordinates: 13.3959466°N 79.9808143°E
- Country: India
- State: Tamil Nadu
- District: Tiruvallur
- Taluk: Gummidipoondi
- Elevation: 39 m (128 ft)

Population (2011)
  - Total: 2,008
- Time zone: UTC+5:30 (IST)
- 2011 census code: 628577

Kannankottai is a village in the Tiruvallur district of Tamil Nadu, India. It is located in the Gummidipoondi taluk.

== Demographics ==
According to the 2011 census of India, Kannankottai has 538 households. The effective literacy rate (i.e. the literacy rate of population excluding children aged 6 and below) is 66.2%.

Demographics (2011 Census)
	Total	Male	Female
Population	2008	987	1021
Children aged below 6 years	227	120	107
Scheduled caste	1256	619	637
Scheduled tribe	75	36	39
Literates	1179	630	549
Workers (all)	1049	581	468
Main workers (total)	1000	568	432
Main workers: Cultivators	393	201	192
Main workers: Agricultural labourers	479	265	214
Main workers: Household industry workers	16	14	2
Main workers: Other	112	88	24
Marginal workers (total)	49	13	36
Marginal workers: Cultivators	7	4	3
Marginal workers: Agricultural labourers	31	5	26
Marginal workers: Household industry workers	4	1	3
Marginal workers: Others	7	3	4
Non-workers	959	406	553
