= Iniyoru Janmam Tharu =

- Directed by: K. Vijayan
- Screenplay by: Parappurathu
- Produced by: Chinna Ramalingam
- Starring: Madhu; Jayabharathi; Adoor Bhasi; CA Balan; Paravoor Bharathan
- Music by: M. B. Sreenivasan
- Release date: 23 June 1972
- Country: India
- Language: Malayalam

Iniyoru Janmam Tharu (transl. Give Me One More Life) is a 1972 Indian Malayalam film, directed by K. Vijayan. The film stars Madhu, Jayabharathi, Adoor Bhasi, C. A. Balan and Paravoor Bharathan in the lead roles. The film was produced by Chinna Ramalingam. The film had musical score by M. B. Sreenivasan.

== Cast ==
- Madhu
- Jayabharathi
- Adoor Bhasi
- C. A. Balan
- Paravoor Bharathan
- Philomina
- Santha Devi
- Veeran

== Soundtrack ==
The music was composed by M. B. Sreenivasan and the lyrics were written by Vayalar Ramavarma.

Song	Singers
"Arali Thulasi Raajamalli"	S. Janaki
"Athyunnathangalirikkum"	P. B. Sreenivas
"Kanmadam Manakkum Kattil"	K. J. Yesudas
"Maamsapushpam"	K. J. Yesudas
"Shabdasaagara Nandinimaare"	K. J. Yesudas, S. Janaki, Jaya Vijaya
"Swagatham Swapnasakhi"	K. J. Yesudas
