= Rugmini =

- Directed by: KP Kumaran
- Starring: Anju; Nedumudi Venu
- Release date: 1989
- Country: India
- Language: Malayalam

Rugmini is a 1989 Indian Malayalam film, directed by KP Kumaran, starring Nedumudi Venu and Anju in the lead roles. Kumaran won the Kerala State Film Award for Best Director for the film.

== Cast ==
- Nedumudi Venu
- Anju as Rugmini
- Innocent
- Ashokan
- Sreenivasan
- Mavelikkara Ponnamma
