= Thottavadi =

- Directed by: M. Krishnan Nair
- Written by: Parappurathu
- Screenplay by: Parappurathu
- Starring: Prem Nazir; Jayabharathi; Adoor Bhasi; Sreelatha Namboothiri
- Cinematography: P. Ramaswami
- Edited by: V. P. Krishnan
- Music by: L. P. R. Varma
- Production company: Athullya Productions
- Distributed by: Popular Films
- Release date: 25 October 1973
- Country: India
- Language: Malayalam

Thottavadi is a 1973 Indian Malayalam film, directed by M. Krishnan Nair. The film stars Prem Nazir, Jayabharathi, Adoor Bhasi and Sreelatha Namboothiri in the lead roles. It was distributed by Popular Films. The film had musical score by L. P. R. Varma.

== Cast ==
- Prem Nazir as Dr. John
- Jayabharathi as Savithri
- Adoor Bhasi as Dr. Pushpangadathan
- T. R. Omana as Bhagiradiyamma
- Kottarakkara Sreedharan Nair as Vaasu/P. V. Pilla
- Prem Prakash as Babu
- Adoor Pankajam as Kamalamma
- Sankaradi as Kuttan Nair
- KPAC Lalitha as Gouri
- Paravoor Bharathan as Madhavan
- Meena as Subhashini
- T. S. Muthaiah as Priest
- Prem Navas as Pulluvan
- Prema as Pulluvathi
- Usharani as Sarasamma

== Soundtrack ==
The music was composed by L. P. R. Varma and the lyrics were written by Vayalar Ramavarma.

| No. | Song | Singers | Lyrics | Length (m:ss) |
|---|---|---|---|---|
| 1 | "Aavemariya" | S. Janaki | Vayalar Ramavarma | |
| 2 | "Chembakamo Chandanamo" | K. J. Yesudas | Vayalar Ramavarma | |
| 3 | "Gothampu Vayalukal" | | Vayalar Ramavarma | |
| 4 | "Pithaave" | K. J. Yesudas | Vayalar Ramavarma | |
| 5 | "Upaasana Upaasana" | P. Jayachandran | Vayalar Ramavarma | |
| 6 | "Veene Veene" | P. Susheela, Raju Felix | Vayalar Ramavarma | |
