= Makane Ninakku Vendi =

Indian film by E.N. Balakrishnan

- Directed by: E. N. Balakrishnan
- Written by: Parappurathu
- Screenplay by: Parappurathu
- Starring: Prem Nazir; Sheela; Kaviyoor Ponnamma; Adoor Bhasi
- Cinematography: G. V. Ramani
- Music by: G. Devarajan
- Production company: Premier Pictures
- Distributed by: Premier Pictures
- Release date: 27 January 1971
- Country: India
- Language: Malayalam

Makane Ninakku Vendi (English: A Learned Thief) is a 1971 Indian Malayalam-language film, directed by E. N. Balakrishnan. The film stars Prem Nazir, Sheela, Kaviyoor Ponnamma and Adoor Bhasi. The film had musical score by G. Devarajan.

== Cast ==
- Prem Nazir as Sam, Thomachan (double role)
- Sheela as Chinnamma
- Kaviyoor Ponnamma as Thomachan's mother
- Adoor Bhasi as Kuruvilla Ashaan
- Thikkurissy Sukumaran Nair as Mammachan
- Prema as Saramma
- T. S. Muthaiah as Peelippochan
- Aarathi as Sophia
- Khadeeja as Kalyani
- Kottarakkara Sreedharan Nair as Mathachan
- Philomina as Achamma
- Ushanandini as Mary
- TR Omana as Eali
- Meena as Martha
- Jose Prakash as Pappachan
- Nellikode Bhaskaran as Chandikunju
- Sreelatha Namboothiri as Mariakutty
- Shobha as Young Sophia

== Soundtrack ==
The music was composed by G. Devarajan and the lyrics were written by Vayalar Ramavarma.

No.	Song	Singers	Lyrics	Length (m:ss)
1	"Baavaakkum Puthranum"	P. Susheela, Renuka	Vayalar Ramavarma	
2	"Irunooru Pournami"	K. J. Yesudas	Vayalar Ramavarma	
3	"Maalaakhamaar"	P. Susheela	Vayalar Ramavarma	
4	"Ponmaane"	P. Jayachandran	Vayalar Ramavarma	
5	"Sneham Virunnu Vilichu"	P. Madhuri	Vayalar Ramavarma	
