= Vallathol =

Vallathol is an Indian Malayalam name that may refer to

- Vallathol Narayana Menon (1878–1958), Malayalam poet
  - Vallathol Award
  - Vallathol Museum in Thrissur District, India
  - Vallathol Nagar railway station in Thrissur District, India
- Vallathol Unnikrishnan, Malayalam actor
- Ravi Vallathol (1952–2020), Malayalam actor
