= Janakeeya Kodathi =

- Directed by: Hassan
- Produced by: Areefa Hassan
- Starring: Madhu; Srividya; Prameela; Ratheesh
- Music by: Songs: A. T. Ummer; Score: S. P. Venkatesh
- Production company: Arifa Enterprises
- Distributed by: Arifa Enterprises
- Release date: 26 April 1985
- Country: India
- Language: Malayalam

Janakeeya Kodathi (lit. 'People's Court') is a 1985 Indian Malayalam film, directed by Hassan and produced by Areefa Hassan. The film stars Madhu, Srividya, Prameela and Ratheesh in the lead roles. The film had songs by A. T. Ummer.

== Cast ==
- Madhu
- Srividya
- Prameela
- Ratheesh
- Sukumaran
- Bhagyalakshmi
- Rahman
- Seema

== Soundtrack ==
The music was composed by A. T. Ummer and the lyrics were written by Cheramangalam.

No.	Song	Singers	Lyrics	Length (m:ss)
1	"Thithaara Thithaara"	P. Susheela	Cheramangalam	
