= Ee Manohara Theeram =

Ee Manoharatheeram
- Directed by: I. V. Sasi
- Written by: Parappurathu
- Screenplay by: Parappurathu
- Produced by: A J Kuriakose
- Starring: Madhu; Jayan; Jayabharathi; KP Ummer
- Cinematography: Vipin Das
- Edited by: K. Narayanan
- Music by: G. Devarajan; Lyrics: Bichu Thirumala
- Distributed by: Mother India Movies
- Release date: 10 February 1978
- Country: India
- Language: Malayalam
- Budget: Super hit

Ee Manoharatheeram is a 1978 Indian Malayalam film, directed by I. V. Sasi. The film stars Madhu, Jayan, Jayabharathi and Vidhubhala in the lead roles. G. Devarajan composed the music.

== Cast ==
- Madhu as Ravi
- Sukumaran as Vishnu
- K. P. Ummer as Ravi
- Jayan as Ajayan
- Jayabharathi as Ganga
- Vidhubala as Geetha
- Rajakokila as Daniya
- Ravikumar as Babu
- Shobhana as Anitha
- Seema as Cabret dancer
- KPAC Lalitha
- Hariharan
- Kuthiravattam Pappu
- Philomina

== Soundtrack ==
The music was composed by G. Devarajan and the lyrics were written by Bichu Thirumala.

No.	Song	Singers	Lyrics	Length (m:ss)
1	"Kadamizhiyithalaal"	K. J. Yesudas	Bichu Thirumala	
2	"Pachakkilee Pavizhapaalvarnname"	K. J. Yesudas, P. Madhuri	Bichu Thirumala	
3	"Poovukalude Bharathanatyam"	P. Madhuri	Bichu Thirumala	
4	"Yaamasankholi"	K. J. Yesudas	Bichu Thirumala	
