= Omana =

- Directed by: J. D. Thottan
- Written by: Parappurath
- Screenplay by: Parappurathu
- Produced by: J. D. Thottan
- Starring: Ravichandran; Prem Nazir; Sheela; Rani Chandra
- Cinematography: P. Dathu
- Edited by: V. P. Krishnan
- Music by: G. Devarajan
- Production company: Thottan Pictures
- Distributed by: Thottan Pictures
- Release date: 28 April 1972
- Country: India
- Language: Malayalam

Omana (lit. 'Precious one') is a 1972 Indian Malayalam-language film, directed and produced by J. D. Thottan. The film stars Ravichandran, Prem Nazir, Sheela and Rani Chandra in the lead roles. The film had musical score by G. Devarajan.

== Cast ==
- Ravichandran
- Prem Nazir
- Sheela
- Rani Chandra
- Alummoodan
- Sankaradi
- Adoor Bhasi
- Kousalya
- Meena
- Khadeeja

== Soundtrack ==
The music was composed by G. Devarajan with lyrics by Vayalar Ramavarma.

No.	Song	Singers	Lyrics	Length (m:ss)
1	"Jamanthippookkal"	K. J. Yesudas	Vayalar Ramavarma	
2	"Maalaakhe Maalaakhe"	K. J. Yesudas	Vayalar Ramavarma	
3	"Pallimanikalum"	P. Madhuri	Vayalar Ramavarma	
4	"Shilaayugathil Shilakalkkellaam"	K. J. Yesudas	Vayalar Ramavarma	
5	"Swargam Swargam"	P. Madhuri	Vayalar Ramavarma	
