= Ganga (1972 film) =

1972 film by M. Karnan

- VCD cover
- Directed by: M. Karnan
- Story by: Mahendran
- Starring: Jaishankar; Rajakokila
- Cinematography: M. Karnan
- Edited by: G. Kalyanasundaram
- Music by: Shankar–Ganesh
- Production company: Indhrani Films
- Release date: 15 January 1972
- Country: India
- Language: Tamil

Ganga is a 1972 Indian Tamil-language Western film directed and filmed by M. Karnan. The film stars Jaishankar and Rajakokila. It was released on 15 January 1972, and became a commercial success.

== Plot ==
Kathirvelu, a reformed robber, lives with his wife and son. He raises his son Ganga to be a brave warrior, but Ganga develops a penchant for women and alcoholism. Kathirvelu, one day, sees his son in a drunken state. Enraged, he expels him from the house. At this juncture, his past life comes back in the form of his gang. They force him to join their gang, but Kathirvelu refuses, and he is murdered in front of his wife. Ganga comes to perform the last rites of his father. His mother takes a vow from him that, until he takes revenge on all the four murderers of his father, he should not look at her face.

== Cast ==
- Jaishankar as Ganga
- S. A. Ashokan
- Major Sundarrajan as Kathirvelu
- Nagesh
- Rajakokila as Gauri
- V. Nagayya
- S. N. Lakshmi
- A. Sakunthala
- Jayakumari
- Usilaimani
- Pakoda Kadhar
- Vijayarekha

== Production ==
Ganga was produced under Indhrani Films, and directed by M. Karnan who also handled the cinematography. The story was written by Mahendran, and the dialogue by Ma. Ra, while the editing was handled by G. Kalyanasundaram.

== Themes ==
Film historian Swarnavel Eswaran Pillai compared Ganga to an earlier Karnan film Kalam Vellum (1970) for being a Western with elements of melodrama combined, along with the protagonist's goal being to avenge a murdered family member. However, while Kalam Vellum focused on the protagonist avenging his sister, Ganga focuses on him avenging his father.

== Soundtrack ==
The soundtrack was composed by Shankar–Ganesh and the lyrics were written by Kannadasan.

Track listing
No.	Title	Singer(s)	Length
1.	"Aagattum Parkkalam"	L. R. Eswari
2.	"Aana Penna Sarithiram"	L. R. Eswari

== Release and reception ==
Ganga was released on 15 January 1972. The film emerged a commercial success and one of the most recognised Westerns in Tamil cinema.

== Bibliography ==
- Mahendran (2013) [2004]. சினிமாவும் நானும் [Cinema and I] (in Tamil). Karpagam Publications. OCLC 54777094.
- Pillai, Swarnavel Eswaran (24 April 2015). "Tamil B Movie Westerns: The Global South and Genre Subversion". The Western in the Global South. Routledge. ISBN 978-1-315-73113-1.
