= Panitheeratha Veedu =

- Directed by: K. S. Sethumadhavan
- Written by: Parappurathu
- Screenplay by: Parappurathu
- Produced by: K.S.R Murthy
- Starring: Prem Nazir; Nanditha Bose; Roja Ramani; Jose Prakash
- Cinematography: Melli Irani
- Edited by: T. R. Sreenivasalu
- Music by: M. S. Viswanathan
- Production company: Chithrakalakendram
- Distributed by: Chithrakalakendram
- Release date: 19 January 1973
- Country: India
- Language: Malayalam

Panitheeratha Veedu (transl. The Incomplete House) is a 1973 Indian Malayalam-language film, directed by K. S. Sethumadhavan. The film stars Prem Nazir, Nanditha Bose, Roja Ramani and Jose Prakash. It is an adaptation of Parappurath's 1964 novel of the same name. It won the Kerala State Film Awards for Best Film, Best Direction, Best Story and Best Singer (Jayachandran). It also won the National Film Award for Best Feature Film in Malayalam and two Filmfare Awards South.

== Cast ==
- Prem Nazir as Jose
- Nanditha Bose as Rachel (dubbed by KPAC Lalitha)
- Shobhana (Roja Ramani) as Leela
- Jose Prakash as Hari's Father
- Prem Prakash as Hari
- Sam
- Abbas as Muthalaali
- Adoor Pankajam as Rosi
- Alummoodan as Vasu
- Baby Sumathi as Roshni
- Bahadoor as Moideen Kakka/Hameed
- E. Madhavan
- Junior Sheelaas Jose's Sister
- N. Govindankutty as Thankayyan
- P. O. Thomas
- Philomina as Jose's Mother
- S. P. Pillai as Jose's Father
- Saraswathi as Sarasu
- V. Govindankutty
- Veeran as Kunjikkannan
- Prema as Sister
- Raveendran

== Soundtrack ==
The music was composed by M. S. Viswanathan with lyrics by Vayalar Ramavarma.

Song	Singers
"Aniyam Maniyam"	P. Susheela
"Kaattumozhukkum"	P. Jayachandran, Latha Raju
"Kannuneerthulliye"	M. S. Viswanathan
"Maaril Syamanthakarathnam Chaarthi"	L. R. Eeswari
"Suprabhaatham"	P. Jayachandran
"Suprabhatham" (Movie Version)	P. Jayachandran
"Va Mammy Va Mummy"	Latha Raju

== Awards ==
National Film Award – 1973

National Film Award for Best Feature Film in Malayalam

Filmfare Awards South – 1973

- Best Film - Malayalam – K.S.R Murthy
- Best Director - Malayalam – K. S. Sethumadhavan

Kerala State Film Award – 1973

- Best Film
- Best Director
- Best Screenplay
- Best Playback Singer
