= Sukumari filmography =

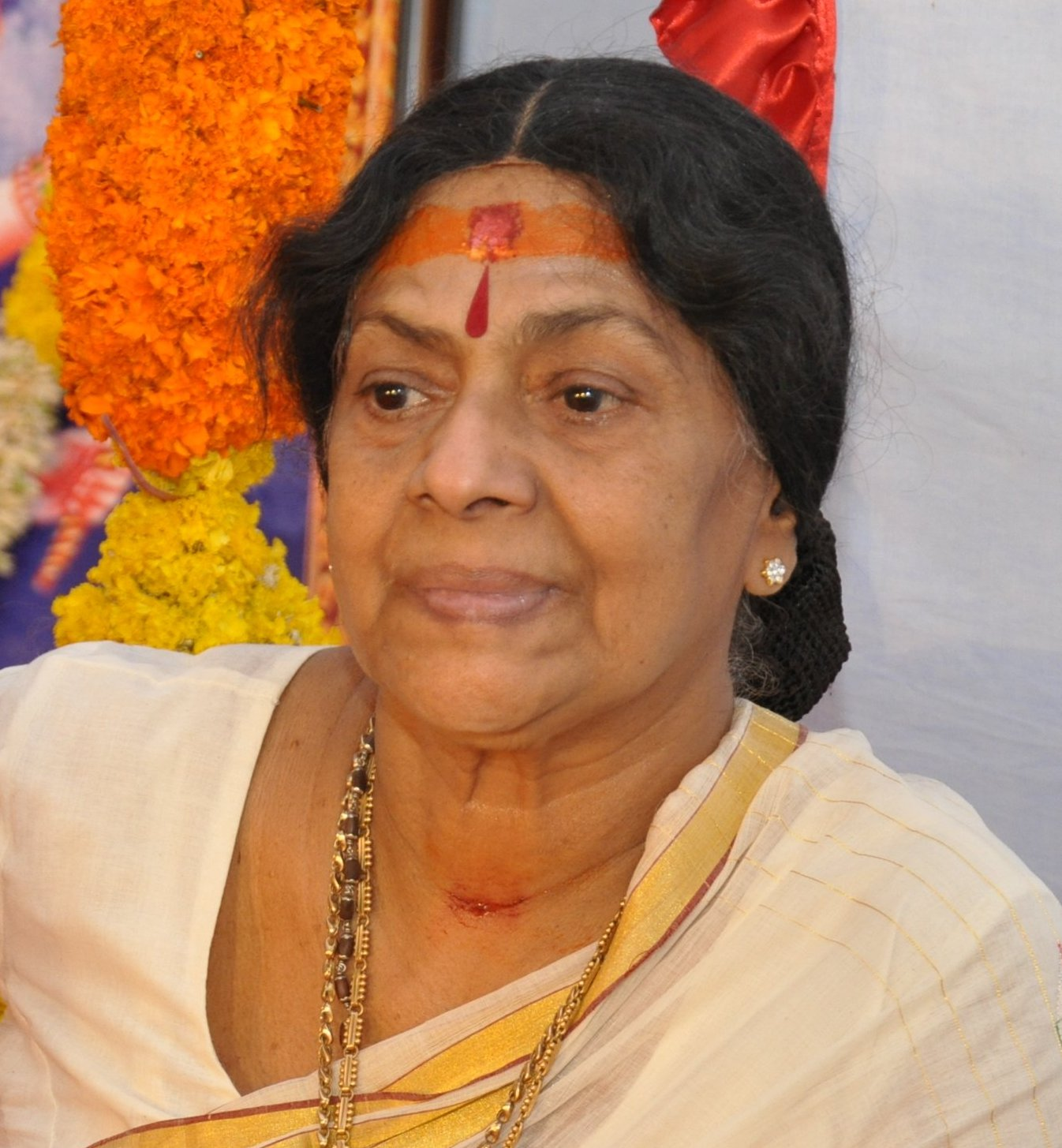
Sukumari

The following is the partial filmography of Sukumari, an Indian actress who began her career at the age of 10 with a minor role in the Tamil film Or Iravu in 1951. In a career spanning more than six decades, had acted in more than 2500 feature films in various Indian languages, including Malayalam, Tamil, Hindi, Telugu, Kannada, Sinhala, Oriya, English and Bengali.

She started her dance career in 1946. As a singer, she has also performed imany concerts. She is also known for her stage career in her early days and performed thousands of shows with various theatre groups. She was an active presence in movies, TV serials, albums, advertisements, dramas, television shows, stage shows, public programmes, special functions, and cultural events for more than 65 years.

== Malayalam ==
=== 1950s ===
| Year | Film | Role | Notes |
|---|---|---|---|
| 1956 | Koodapirappu | | |
| 1957 | Thaskaraveeran | Janaki | |
| 1957 | Sakundala | | |
| 1959 | Naadodikal | Santha | |

=== 1960s ===
| Year | Film | Role | Notes |
|---|---|---|---|
| 1961 | Krishna Kuchela | Radha | |
| 1961 | Ummini Thanka | Valli | |
| 1962 | Bhagyajathakam | | |
| 1962 | Snehadeepam | | |
| 1962 | Viyarppinte Vila | | |
| 1962 | Kalpadukal | | National Film Award for Best Feature Film in Malayalam |
| 1962 | Kannum Karalum | Mohan's first wife | |
| 1962 | Sreerama Pattabhishekam | Dancer | |
| 1962 | Vidhi Thanna Vilakku | Dancer | |
| 1962 | Veluthambi Dalawa | Janaki | |
| 1963 | Kadalamma | | |
| 1963 | Chilamboli | Thara | |
| 1964 | School Master | | |
| 1964 | Pazhassi Raja | | |
| 1964 | Anna | | |
| 1964 | Omanakuttan | Sreedevi | |
| 1964 | Kalanju Kittiya Thankam | Amminikutty Amma | |
| 1964 | Thacholi Othenan | Unniyarcha | |
| 1965 | Shakuntala | | |
| 1965 | Rajamalli | | |
| 1965 | Shyamala Chechi | Sumathi | |
| 1965 | Murappennu | Mrs.Menon | National Film Award for Best Feature Film in Malayalam |
| 1965 | Bhoomiyile Malakha | Sophie | |
| 1965 | Jeevitha Yaathra | Vasanthy | |
| 1965 | Ammu | Saro | |
| 1965 | Kuppivala | Pachumma | |
| 1965 | Sarpakadu | Nagalatha | |
| 1965 | Chettathi | Bharathi | |
| 1966 | Kanakachilanka | | |
| 1966 | Kadamattathachan | | |
| 1966 | Kayamkulam Kochunni | Vazhapilli Janakipilla | |
| 1966 | Kalithozhan | Mridula | |
| 1966 | Kusruthy Kuttan | Devaki | |
| 1966 | Tharavattamma | Velamma | |
| 1967 | Kottayam Kolacase | | |
| 1967 | Madatharuvi | | |
| 1967 | N.G.O | | |
| 1967 | Postman | | |
| 1967 | Khadeeja | | |
| 1967 | Kunjali Marakkar | | National Film Award for Best Feature Film in Malayalam |
| 1967 | Chithramela | | Segment: "Apaswarangal" |
| 1967 | Kaanatha Veshangal | | |
| 1967 | Pooja | Kaathamma | |
| 1967 | Udhyogastha | Janaki Amma | |
| 1967 | Nagarame Nandi | Mrs. Mudailair | |
| 1967 | Paavappettaval | Ambujakshy | |
| 1967 | Ashwamedham | Gerly | |
| 1967 | Collector Malathy | Madhavikutty | |
| 1967 | Anveshichu Kandethiyilla | Savithri | National Film Award for Best Feature Film in Malayalam |
| 1968 | Inspector | | |
| 1968 | Dial 2244 | | |
| 1968 | Aparadhini | | |
| 1968 | Kaliyalla Kalyanam | | |
| 1968 | Bhagyamudra | | |
| 1968 | Lakshaprabhu | Social worker, Ms. Priya | |
| 1968 | Viruthan Shanku | Paarukuttyamma | |
| 1968 | Manaswini | Rekha | |
| 1968 | Yakshi | Kalyani | |
| 1969 | Anaachadanam | | |
| 1969 | Virunnukari | Kamakshiyamma | |
| 1969 | Danger Biscuit | Muthulaxmi | |

=== 1970s ===
| Year | Film | Role | Notes |
|---|---|---|---|
| 1970 | Palunku Pathram | | |
| 1970 | Nishagandhi | | |
| 1970 | Priya | Radha | |
| 1970 | Mindapennu | Pankajakshi | |
| 1970 | Vivahitha | Mary | |
| 1971 | Moonnupookkal | | |
| 1971 | Navavadhu | Samajam Santhanavalli | |
| 1971 | Karinizhal | Lurdammal | |
| 1971 | Aabhijathyam | Sreedevi | |
| 1971 | Vithukal | Sharada | |
| 1972 | Theerthayathra | Sreekumarikkutty | |
| 1973 | Chenda | Appu's stepmother | |
| 1973 | Padmavyooham | Maaya | |
| 1973 | Thekkan Kattu | Shyamala Khanna | |
| 1973 | Police Ariyaruthe | Ruby | |
| 1974 | Nagaram Sagaram | | |
| 1974 | Thacholi Marumakan Chandu | Kunki | |
| 1974 | Sethubandhanam | Parvathy | |
| 1974 | Bhoomidevi Pushpiniyayi | Bhanumathi | |
| 1974 | Bhoogolam Thiriyunnu | Chandramathi | |
| 1974 | Poonthenaruvi | Kunju Mariyamma | |
| 1974 | Chattakkari | Maggie | Dubbed into Telugu as English Ammayi; Kerala State Film Award for Second Best Film; Kerala State Film Award for Best Story; Kerala State Film Award for Second Best Actress |
| 1975 | Madhurappathinezhu | | |
| 1975 | Aaranya Kandam | | |
| 1975 | Mattoru Seetha | | |
| 1975 | Ullasa Yaathra | | |
| 1975 | Boy Friend | | |
| 1975 | Niramaala | | |
| 1975 | Kottaaram Vilkkaanundu | Margaret Madamma | |
| 1975 | Abhimaanam | Leelamani | |
| 1975 | Makkal | Akhilandamma | |
| 1975 | Chumaduthangi | Parvathy | |
| 1975 | Raagam | Gomathi | |
| 1975 | Swami Ayyappan | Lakshmi | Kerala State Film Award for Best Popular Film; Dubbed into Telugu as Swami Ayyappa |
| 1976 | Aruthu | | |
| 1976 | Kuttavum Shikshayum | | |
| 1976 | Neela Sari | | |
| 1976 | Njavalppazhangal | | |
| 1976 | Agni Pushpam | Pushpa Menon | |
| 1976 | Ajayanum Vijayanum | Devaki Thampuratti | |
| 1976 | Vazhivilakku | Mrs. W. K. Nair | |
| 1976 | Ammini Ammaavan | Kunjamma | |
| 1976 | Appooppan | Bharathiyamma | Also known as Charithram Aavarthikkunnilla |
| 1976 | Aayiram Janmangal | Leela | |
| 1976 | Amrithavaahini | Sumathi | |
| 1977 | Sankhupushpam | | |
| 1977 | Chakravarthini | | |
| 1977 | Madhura Swapnam | | |
| 1977 | Aadhya Paadam | | |
| 1977 | Tholkan Enikku Manassilla | | |
| 1977 | Sangamam | | |
| 1977 | Amme Anupame | | |
| 1977 | Sneham | | |
| 1977 | Veedu Oru Swargam | | |
| 1977 | Aparaajitha | | |
| 1977 | Aaraadhana | | |
| 1977 | Kaduvaye Pidicha Kiduva | | |
| 1977 | Mini Mol | | |
| 1977 | Bhaaryaavijayam | Ammayiyamma | |
| 1977 | Ammaayi Amma | Bhanumathiyamma | |
| 1977 | Anthardaaham | Sumathi | |
| 1977 | Hridayame Sakshi | Shyamala Devi | |
| 1977 | Sreedevi | Karthyayani Amma | |
| 1977 | Santha Oru Devatha | Rosy's mother | |
| 1977 | Nirakudam | Bhargavi | |
| 1977 | Sujatha | Sugumari | |
| 1977 | Guruvayur Kesavan | Thampuratti | |
| 1977 | Aanandham Paramaanandham | Babu's & Shekharankutty's mother | |
| 1977 | Rathimanmadhan | Gomathi | |
| 1977 | Abhinivesham | Lady Doctor | |
| 1977 | Kannappanunni | Ummini | |
| 1977 | Achaaram Ammini Osharam Omana | Pathmavathi | |
| 1978 | Raghuvamsham | | |
| 1978 | Gaandharvam | | Also known as Kanakam |
| 1978 | Avakaasham | | |
| 1978 | Vishwaroopam | | |
| 1978 | Rajan Paranja Katha | | |
| 1978 | Rappadikalude Gatha | | |
| 1978 | Uthrada Rathri | | |
| 1978 | Pichipoo | | |
| 1978 | Hemantharaathri | | |
| 1978 | Nakshathrangale Kaaval | | |
| 1978 | Soothrakkaari | | |
| 1978 | Randu Penkuttikal | | |
| 1978 | Aval Kanda Lokam | | |
| 1978 | Maattoly | Kochammini | |
| 1978 | Snehathinte Mukhangal | Sarasa | |
| 1978 | Balapareekshanam | Parvathy Amma | |
| 1978 | Asthamayam | Alamelu | |
| 1978 | Kanyaka | Madhaviyamma | |
| 1978 | Ee Ganam Marakkumo | Mariyamma | |
| 1978 | Kadathanaattu Maakkam | Poorani | |
| 1978 | Vadakakku Oru Hridayam | Paramu Pillai's wife | Dubbed into Hindi as Man Ka Aangan |
| 1978 | Aarum Anyaralla | Achamma | |
| 1979 | Paapathinu Maranamilla | | |
| 1979 | Ival Oru Naadody | | |
| 1979 | Ward No.7 | | |
| 1979 | Kaumarapraayam | | |
| 1979 | Veerabhadran | | |
| 1979 | Pratheeksha | | |
| 1979 | Kaalam Kaathu Ninnilla | | |
| 1979 | Chuvanna Chirakukal | | |
| 1979 | Anubhavangale Nanni | | |
| 1979 | Vadaka Veedu | | |
| 1979 | Surya Daham | | Kerala State Film Award for Best Story |
| 1979 | Pichathy Kuttappan | Saraswathy | |
| 1979 | Sikharangal | Mrs. Fernandez | |
| 1979 | Thuramukham | Kochuthresia | |
| 1979 | Mochanam | Saraswathi | |
| 1979 | Manasa Vacha Karmana | Suku's mother | |
| 1979 | Simhaasanam | Padmanabhan Kurup's wife | |
| 1979 | Avalude Prathikaram | Kochamma | |
| 1979 | Sarpam | Saheera's mother | |
| 1979 | Ajnaatha Theerangal | Kalyani P Nair | |
| 1979 | Raathrikal Ninakku Vendi | Cheerukutti | |
| 1979 | Itha Oru Theeram | Meenakshi | |
| 1979 | Kannukal | Vishalam | |
| 1979 | Allauddinum Albhutha Vilakkum | Ayishaumma | Dubbed into Hindi as Aladdin and the Wonderful Lamp and Telugu as Alavuthinum Arputha Deepam |
| 1979 | Peruvazhiyambalam | Paramu Pillai's wife | National Film Award for Best Feature Film in Malayalam; Kerala State Film Award for Second Best Film; Kerala State Film Award for Best Story |
| 1979 | Anupallavi | Soman's mother | |
| 1979 | Maamaankam | Cherukutti | |
| 1979 | Venalil Oru Mazha | Panki | |
| 1979 | Rakthamillatha Manushyan | Kamala Ambal | |
| 1979 | Ezhunirangal | Sharada's mother, Teacher | Kerala State Film Award for Second Best Actress for various films |
| 1979 | Sandhyaragam | Annamma | |
| 1979 | Jeevitham Oru Gaanam | Annamma | |

=== 1980s ===
| Year | Title | Role | Notes |
|---|---|---|---|
| 1980 | Seetha | | |
| 1980 | Puzha | | |
| 1980 | Theeram Thedunnavar | | |
| 1980 | Hridhayam Paadunnu | Raju's mother | |
| 1980 | Pavizha Mutthu | Naani | |
| 1980 | Kochu Kochu Thettukal | Saramma Chedathi | |
| 1980 | Dooram Arike | Alamelu | |
| 1980 | Eden Thottam | Usha's mother | |
| 1980 | Angadi | Karunakaran's wife | Highest grossing Malayalam movie of the year |
| 1980 | Thaliritta Kinakkal | Meher's mother | |
| 1980 | Shalini Ente Koottukari | Shantha | |
| 1980 | Kaavalmaadam | Pathumma | |
| 1980 | Naayattu | Sumathi | |
| 1980 | Ammayum Makalum | Madhavi | |
| 1980 | Akalangalil Abhayam | Julie | |
| 1980 | Chandra Bimbam | Rathi's mother | |
| 1980 | Swantham Enna Padam | Nadanam Sathyabhama | |
| 1980 | Deepam | Varma's mother | |
| 1980 | Ivar | Mary | |
| 1980 | Pappu | Pappu's mother | |
| 1980 | Aagamanam | Subhadra Menon | |
| 1980 | Dwik Vijayam | College Principal | |
| 1980 | Bhaktha Hanuman | Anjana Devi | Dubbed into Tamil as Raam Baktha Hanumaan |
| 1980 | Adhikaram | Bhargavi Amma | |
| 1980 | Ambalavilakku | Srimathi Rama Varma | |
| 1980 | Idi Muzhakkam | Gouri | |
| 1980 | Vaiki Vanna Vasantham | Maggie | |
| 1981 | Greeshma Jwala | | |
| 1981 | Sathi Teacherum Ratheesh Babuvum | | |
| 1981 | Vallarpadathamma | | |
| 1981 | Jalarekha | | |
| 1981 | Enne Snehikkoo Enne Maathram | | |
| 1981 | Veshangal | | |
| 1981 | Samskaram | | |
| 1981 | Pinneyum Pookkunna Kaadu | | |
| 1981 | Kattupothu | | |
| 1981 | Hamsageetham | | |
| 1981 | Dwandha Yudham | Rema | |
| 1981 | Garjanam | Dr. Vijay's mother | |
| 1981 | Swarangal Swapnagal | Teacher | |
| 1981 | Thadavara | Sarojini | |
| 1981 | Venal | Saraswathy | |
| 1981 | Vayal | Savithri | |
| 1981 | Asthamikkatha Pakalukal | Bhavani | |
| 1981 | Thenum Vayambum | Varma's mother | |
| 1981 | Parvathi | Lakshmi Bai | |
| 1981 | Orikkal Koodi | Mrs. Thampi | |
| 1981 | Parankimala | Appu's mother | |
| 1981 | Aambal Poovu | Bhavani | |
| 1981 | Swarnappakshikal | Dakshayaniyamma | |
| 1981 | Kolilakkam | Kumar's foster mother | Highest grossing Malayalam movie of the year |
| 1981 | Thaaravu | Kaalipennu | |
| 1981 | Arayannam | Nalini's mother | |
| 1981 | Poocha Sanyasi | Kanakamma | |
| 1981 | Archana Teacher | Bhageerathiyamma | |
| 1981 | Sanchari | Kotha/Kadambari | |
| 1981 | Ahimsa | Bharathan's mother | |
| 1982 | Kayam | | |
| 1982 | Marupacha | | |
| 1982 | Mukhangal | | |
| 1982 | Ezhara Ponnana | | |
| 1982 | Anthiveyilile Ponnu | | |
| 1982 | Niram Marunna Nimishangal | | |
| 1982 | Odukkam Thudakkam | | |
| 1982 | Ruby My Darling | Ruby's mother | |
| 1982 | Velicham Vitharunna Penkutty | Parvathi | |
| 1982 | Pooviriyum Pulari | Madhavi | |
| 1982 | Enthino Pookunna Pookkal | Puthenpurakkal Saraswathi Amma | |
| 1982 | Ponnum Poovum | Lakshmi | |
| 1982 | Kazhumaram | Bharathi Amma, Gomathi Amma | Double role |
| 1982 | Kilukilukkam | Anjali's mother | |
| 1982 | Snehapoorvam Meera | Bhagi | |
| 1982 | Padayottam | Chiruthevi Thampuratti | Highest grossing Malayalam movie of the year India's first indigenously produced 70 mm film |
| 1982 | Ithu Njangalude Katha | Naniyamma | |
| 1982 | Ithiri Neram Othiri Karyam | Madhavi | |
| 1982 | Chiriyo Chiri | Herself | |
| 1982 | Chillu | Manu's mother | |
| 1982 | Oru Vilippadakale | Swarna Ammaal | |
| 1982 | Aayudham | Saraswathi | |
| 1982 | Njan Onnu Parayatte | Ammini | |
| 1982 | Chambalkadu | Beeran's mother | |
| 1982 | Amrutha Geetham | Suresh's Mother | |
| 1982 | Njaan Ekanaanu | Vasanthy | |
| 1982 | Aranjaanam | Puppy | |
| 1982 | Kaaliya Mardhanam | Johny's mother | |
| 1982 | Anuraagakkodathi | Meenakshi | |
| 1982 | Kaattile Paattu | Janaki | |
| 1982 | Ethiralikal | Karthyayani | |
| 1982 | Irattimadhuram | Kalyaniyamma | |
| 1982 | Innalenkil Nale | Amalu | Dubbed into Telugu as Taxi Driver |
| 1983 | Enne Njan Thedunnu | | |
| 1983 | Kaikeyi | | |
| 1983 | Arunayude Prabhatham | | |
| 1983 | Ponnethooval | | |
| 1983 | Asuran | | |
| 1983 | Yudham | Bhageerathi | |
| 1983 | Ee Vazhi Mathram | Geetha's mother | |
| 1983 | Theeram Thedunna Thira | Jayalakshmi's mother | |
| 1983 | Aashrayam | Chanthutty's mother | |
| 1983 | Mouna Raagam | Mandakini Aunty | |
| 1983 | Parasparam | Geetha's mother | |
| 1983 | Aadyathe Anuraagam | Syamala's mother | |
| 1983 | Ashtapadi | Unnikrishnan's mother | |
| 1983 | Aana | Rasiya Beevi | |
| 1983 | Varanmaare Aavashyamundu | Kalyani | |
| 1983 | Bandham | Kousalya | |
| 1983 | Engane Nee Marakkum | Shambu's mother | |
| 1983 | Kuyiline Thedi | Kousalya | |
| 1983 | Veena Poovu | Savithri | |
| 1983 | Sandhyakku Virinja Poovu | Jayamohan's mother | |
| 1983 | Coolie | Sethu's mother | |
| 1983 | Nanayam | Sindhu's mother | |
| 1983 | Enikku Vishakunnu | Naani Paruthi | |
| 1983 | Thimingalam | Bhanu | |
| 1983 | Saagaram Santham | Maragadham | |
| 1983 | Prasnam Gurutharam | Dr. Mary Mathew | |
| 1983 | Rugma | Gracy's mother | |
| 1983 | Pin Nilavu | Saraswathi | |
| 1983 | Oru Swakaryam | Chandran's mother | |
| 1983 | Onnu Chirikku | Radha | |
| 1983 | Kinaram | Mary | |
| 1983 | Koodevide | Susan | Kerala State Film Award for Second Best Actress; Kerala State Film Award for Best Popular Film |
| 1983 | Karyam Nissaram | Annie | Kerala State Film Award for Second Best Actress |
| 1983 | Guru Dakshina | Parvathy | Dubbed into Telugu as Guru Dakshana |
| 1983 | Ente Katha | Gowriyamma | |
| 1983 | Aattakalasam | Mandakini | |
| 1983 | Asthram | Sharada | |
| 1983 | Aa Rathri | Sundereshan's mother | First Malayalam movie to collect 1 crore |
| 1984 | Theere Pratheekshikkathe | | |
| 1984 | Mynaakam | | |
| 1984 | Uyarangalil | | |
| 1984 | Ivide Thudangunnu | | |
| 1984 | Chakkarayumma | | |
| 1984 | Attahaasam | | Also known as Thaarunayam |
| 1984 | Anthassu | | |
| 1984 | Ivide Aarambham | | |
| 1984 | Nethavu | | |
| 1984 | Ente Nandinikutty | | |
| 1984 | Ente Kalithozhan | | |
| 1984 | Anithichuvappu | | |
| 1984 | Velicham Illatha Veedhi | Mrs. Menon | |
| 1984 | Unni Vanna Divasam | Saradha | Dubbed in Tamil as Love Birds |
| 1984 | Aduthaduthu | Gaurikutty | |
| 1984 | Vepraalam | Sumathi | |
| 1984 | Thacholi Thankappan | Ayishu | |
| 1984 | Thirakal | James's mother | |
| 1984 | Alakadalinakkare | Daisy's mother | |
| 1984 | Paavam Poornima | Soumini | |
| 1984 | Vikatakavi | Nabeesa's mother | |
| 1984 | Thathamme Poocha Poocha | Sumathy | |
| 1984 | Swanthamevide Bandhamevide | Indulekha's mother | |
| 1984 | Poochakkoru Mookkuthi | Revathi | |
| 1984 | Parannu Parannu Parannu | Elizabeth | |
| 1984 | Swarna Gopuram | Johny's mother | |
| 1984 | Sandarbham | Indu's mother | |
| 1984 | Onnanu Nammal | Dr. Rachel | |
| 1984 | Muthodumuthu | Bhavani | |
| 1984 | Vellam | Kunju Lakshmi | |
| 1984 | Koottinilamkili | Sarada | |
| 1984 | Kanamarayathu | Roy's mother | Dubbed into Telugu as Manushulu Marali; Kerala State Film Award for Best Screenplay |
| 1984 | Kaliyil Alpam Karyam | Vinayan's mother | |
| 1984 | Ivide Ingane | Bharathi | |
| 1984 | Itha Innu Muthal | Shankar's mother | |
| 1984 | Ethirppukal | Geetha's mother | |
| 1984 | Athirathram | Kathamma | Dubbed into Hindi as Jaanbaaz Policewala |
| 1984 | Ariyaatha Veethikal | Kalyanikutty | |
| 1984 | Arante Mulla Kochu Mulla | Omanakuttan's mother | |
| 1984 | Swantham Sarika | Krishnan Nair's wife | |
| 1984 | Appunni | Malu | |
| 1984 | Adiyozhukkukal | Radha | |
| 1984 | Aarorumariyathe | Subhadra | |
| 1984 | Aalkkoottathil Thaniye | Cheeru | Kerala State Film Award for Second Best Film |
| 1984 | April 18 | Judge | |
| 1984 | Panchavadi Palam | Rahel | |
| 1984 | Sreekrishna Parunthu | Kochamma | |
| 1984 | Odaruthammava Aalariyam | Major Nair's wife | |
| 1984 | Karimbu | Mereena's mother | |
| 1984 | Nokkethadhoorathu Kannum Nattu | Sreekumar's mother | Kerala State Film Award for Best Popular Film |
| 1984 | Vanitha Police | HC Sarasamma | |
| 1984 | Kudumbam Oru Swargam Bharya Oru Devatha | Meenakshi | |
| 1984 | Kodathi | Saraswathiyamma | |
| 1984 | NH 47 | | |
| 1985 | Akalathe Ambili | | |
| 1985 | Oduvil Kittiya Vartha | | |
| 1985 | Thammil Kandappol | | |
| 1985 | Ee Sabdam Innathe Sabdam | | |
| 1985 | Shaantham Bheekaram | | |
| 1985 | Paara | | Paired with Bheeman Raghu |
| 1985 | Scene No. 7 | Thathri Antharjanam | Dubbed into Telugu as Bhayankara Ratri |
| 1985 | Kaiyum Thlayum Purathidaruthe | Narayani | |
| 1985 | Menicheppu Thurannappol | Grandmother | |
| 1985 | Mounanombaram | Bhargaviyamma | |
| 1985 | Vilichu Vilikettu | Vijayan's mother | |
| 1985 | Guruji Oru Vakku | Betty's mother | |
| 1985 | Ente Kaanakkuyil | Subhadra Thankachi | |
| 1985 | Pachavelicham | Nandhinikutty's mother | |
| 1985 | Punnaram Cholli Cholli | Sundari | |
| 1985 | Koodum Thedi | Nun | |
| 1985 | Upaharam | Divakaran's wife | |
| 1985 | Avidathepole Ivideyum | Sukumaran's mother | |
| 1985 | Oru Kudakkeezhil | Bharathi | |
| 1985 | Thammil Thammil | Vivek's mother | |
| 1985 | Vellarikka Pattanam | Nun | |
| 1985 | Oru Naal Innoru Naal | Sukumaran's mother | |
| 1985 | Ithu Nalla Thamasha | Kalyaniyamma | |
| 1985 | Principal Olivil | Vasumathi | |
| 1985 | Archana Aaradhana | Omana | |
| 1985 | Kandu Kandarinju | Janaki | |
| 1985 | Idanilangal | Saramma | |
| 1985 | Oru Nokku Kanan | Vilasini | |
| 1985 | Onningu Vannengil | Subhadra | |
| 1985 | Anu Bandham | Malu | Kerala State Film Award for Best Story |
| 1985 | Eeran Sandhya | Seetha | |
| 1985 | Vasantha Sena | Reetha | |
| 1985 | Puli Varunne Puli | Bhavani | |
| 1985 | Gaayathridevi Ente Amma | Raju's mother | |
| 1985 | Akkare Ninnoru Maran | Savithri | |
| 1985 | Onnanam Kunnil Oradi Kunnil | Mrs. Menon | |
| 1985 | Mukhyamanthri | Minister, Kozhivila's wife | |
| 1985 | Mutharamkunnu P.O. | Bhavani | |
| 1985 | Aram + Aram = Kinnaram | Karthyani | |
| 1985 | Parayanumvayya Parayathirikkanumvayya | Meenakshi | |
| 1985 | Boeing Boeing | Dick Ammayi | |
| 1985 | Adhyayam Onnu Muthal | Karthyayaniyamma | |
| 1985 | Makan Ente Makan | Saraswathy | |
| 1985 | Karimbinpoovinakkare | Shivan's aunt | |
| 1985 | Rangam | Chandrika's mother | |
| 1986 | Aavanazhi | | |
| 1986 | Oru Yugasandhya | | |
| 1986 | Nyayavidhi | | |
| 1986 | Nidhiyude Katha | | |
| 1986 | Pratighatana | | |
| 1986 | Rajathanthram | | |
| 1986 | Aval Kaathirunnu Avanum | | |
| 1986 | Karyam Kananoru Kallachiri | | |
| 1986 | Ennu Nathante Nimmi | Venkidi's mother | |
| 1986 | Love Story | Rukmini | |
| 1986 | Meenamasathile Sooryan | Abubacker's mother | |
| 1986 | Akalangalil | Sumithraamma | |
| 1986 | Ithramathram | Prameela | |
| 1986 | Koodanayum Kattu | Maggie Freddy | |
| 1986 | Ashtabandham | Amina | |
| 1986 | T.P. Balagopalan M.A. | Anitha's mother | Kerala State Film Award for Best Story |
| 1986 | Adiverukal | Balakrishnan's mother | Dubbed into Hindi as Jaanwar Aur Insan |
| 1986 | Mizhineerppoovukal | Mother Superior | |
| 1986 | Yuvajanotsavam | Leelama | |
| 1986 | Sughamodevi | Bharathi | |
| 1986 | Sanmanassullavarkku Samadhanam | Panikkar's mother | |
| 1986 | Revathikkoru Pavakkutty | Devootty | |
| 1986 | Onnu Muthal Poojaym Vare | Mother Superior | Kerala State Film Award for Best Cinematography |
| 1986 | Hello My Dear Wrong Number | Forensic officer | |
| 1986 | Ninnishtam Ennishtam | Kaakkathiyamma | |
| 1986 | Doore Doore Oru Koodu Koottam | Kalyani teacher | National Film Award for Best Film on Other Social Issues |
| 1986 | Thalavattam | Nurse Rachel | |
| 1986 | Kunjattakilikal | Kamalamma | |
| 1986 | Ente Entethu Mathrem | Padmavathi | Dubbed into Telugu as Papa Kosam |
| 1986 | Ennennum Kannettante | Vasumathi | Kerala State Film Award for Best Popular Film |
| 1986 | Ayalvasi Oru Daridravasi | Subhadra Kunjamma | |
| 1986 | Arappatta Kettiya Gramathil | Devaki | Kerala State Film Award for Second Best Actress |
| 1986 | Snehamulla Simham | Kamalamma | |
| 1986 | Adukkan Entheluppam | Bharathi | Also known as Akalanenthuluppam |
| 1986 | Gandhinagar 2nd Street | Colony Secretary | |
| 1986 | Nandi Veendum Varika | Madhavi | |
| 1986 | Moonnu Masangalkku Munpu | Mrs. Menon | |
| 1986 | Aayiram Kannukal | Anu's mother | |
| 1986 | Veendum | Club lady | |
| 1986 | Poovinnu Puthiya Poonthennal | Doctor | |
| 1986 | Ee Kaikalil | Sultan's foster mother | |
| 1986 | Malarum Kiliyum | Thulasi's mother | |
| 1986 | Abhayam Thedi | Ammalukutty | |
| 1986 | Geetham | Swamini/Amma of Saranaalayam | |
| 1986 | Rakkuyilin Ragasadassil | Kannamma | |
| 1986 | Mazha Peyyunnu Maddalam Kottunnu | MA Dhawan's mother | |
| 1986 | Chekeranoru Chilla | Lathika's mother | |
| 1986 | Rareeram | Soudamini | |
| 1986 | Naale Njangalude Vivaham | Saraswathiyamma | |
| 1987 | Nadodikkattu | | |
| 1987 | Iniyethra Dooram | | |
| 1987 | Krishnapaksham | | |
| 1987 | Kaanan Kothichu | | |
| 1987 | Neeyethra Dhanya | | |
| 1987 | Kottum Kuravayum | Amina | |
| 1987 | Sreedharante Onnam Thirumurivu | Bhanumathi | |
| 1987 | Archanppookkal | Hari's sister | |
| 1987 | Jaithra Yaathra | Jayan's mother | |
| 1987 | Amme Bhagavathi | Ponnamma | Dubbed into Telugu as Devi Bhagavathi |
| 1987 | Sarvakalasala | Leelamma | |
| 1987 | Varshangal Poyathariyathe | Bhagi | |
| 1987 | Aattakatha | Jamma Madam | |
| 1987 | Vrutham | Savithri | Dubbed into Tamil as Viratham |
| 1987 | Onnaam Maanam Poomaanam | Saraswathiyamma | Also known as Arinjo Ariyatheyo |
| 1987 | Vilambaram | Mary | |
| 1987 | Thoovanathumbikal | Jayakrishnan's mother | |
| 1987 | Ayitham | Puthiyamma | |
| 1987 | Jaalakam | Devu | |
| 1987 | Ivide Ellavarkkum Sukham | Fortune Teller | |
| 1987 | Aalippazhangal | Savithri | |
| 1987 | Unnikale Oru Kadha Parayam | Kunjannamma | |
| 1987 | Irupatham Noottandu | Janakiyamma | Highest grossing Malayalam movie of the year Ran more than 250 days in theaters |
| 1987 | Amrutham Gamaya | Haridas' mother | Kerala State Film Award for Best Screenplay |
| 1987 | Adimakal Udamakal | Janu | |
| 1987 | Kalam Mari Katha Mari | Alimma | |
| 1987 | Manivatharile Aayiram Sivarathrikal | Vinayachandran's mother | |
| 1988 | Ormmayil Ennum | | |
| 1988 | Witness | | |
| 1988 | Onthu Vasu Manthriyayi | | |
| 1988 | Theerathinariyumo Thirayude Vedana | | |
| 1988 | Oru Vivaada Vishayam | Ravishankar's mother | |
| 1988 | Innaleyude Baakki | Rajan's mother | |
| 1988 | David David Mr. David | David's mother | |
| 1988 | Oozham | Ravi's mother | |
| 1988 | Vellanakalude Nadu | Pavithran's mother | |
| 1988 | Daisy | Aaya | Dubbed into Hindi as Daisy |
| 1988 | Kudumbapuranam | Thrikkunnathu Bhageerathiyamma | |
| 1988 | Oohakachavadam | Nun | |
| 1988 | Dhwani | Thankamani | |
| 1988 | Oru Muthassi Katha | Akkan | |
| 1988 | Chithram | Bhaskaran Nambiar's mother | Dubbed into Hindi as Khooni Insaan; Highest grossing Malayalam movie of the year Ran more than 366 days in theaters |
| 1988 | Aryan | Devan's mother | Dubbed into Hindi as Aarayan Mera Naam |
| 1988 | Orkkapurathu | Mamma | |
| 1988 | Aranyakam | Shailaja's mother | |
| 1988 | Aparan | Savithri | Kerala State Film Award for Best Screenplay |
| 1988 | Vicharana | Saraswathy | |
| 1988 | Dinarathrangal | Lakshmi | |
| 1988 | Oru CBI Diary Kurippu | Nun | |
| 1989 | Jagratha | | |
| 1989 | Bhadrachitta | | |
| 1989 | Agnipravesham | Venu's mother | |
| 1989 | Varnatheru | Nun | Also known as Radham |
| 1989 | Vadakkunokkiyantram | Shobha's mother | Kerala State Film Award for Best Film |
| 1989 | Swagatham | Daisy aunty | |
| 1989 | Ulsavapittennu | Bhageerathi | |
| 1989 | Ramji Rao Speaking | Gopalakrishnan's mother | Highest grossing Malayalam movie of the year |
| 1989 | News | Sulochana | |
| 1989 | Kaalal Pada | Arun's mother | Dubbed into Tamil as Pudhiya Visarana |
| 1989 | Dasharatham | Maggie | Dubbed into Marathi as Mazaa Mulga; Dubbed into Hindi as Mera Bheta |
| 1989 | Chakkikotha Chankaran | Subhadra Kunjamma | |
| 1989 | Oru Vadakkan Veeragatha | Kannappa Chekavar's wife | Kerala State Film Award for Best Popular Film; Ran more than 300 days in theaters Kerala State Film Award for Best Screenplay; National Film Award for Best Screenplay; National Film Award for Best Costume Design; National Film Award for Best Production Design; Kerala State Film Award for Best Cinematography |
| 1989 | Utharam | Molly aunty | |
| 1989 | Adharvam | Thevalli's wife | Dubbed into Telugu as Veedagni |
| 1989 | Vandanam | Margaret Antony Rosen (Maggie) | |
| 1989 | Njangalude Kochu Doctor | Thresiakutty | |
| 1989 | Artham | Janardanan's mother | |

=== 1990s ===
| Year | Film | Role | Notes |
|---|---|---|---|
| 1990 | Ee Thanutha Veluppan Kalathu | Stella | |
| 1990 | Kuttettan | Vishnu's mother | |
| 1990 | Iyer the Great | Soorya's mother | Dubbed into Tamil as Bhagawan |
| 1990 | Anantha Vruthantham | Mercey | |
| 1990 | Kalikkalam | Jamal's mother | |
| 1990 | Midhya | Ammalu | |
| 1990 | Akkare Akkare Akkare | House owner | |
| 1990 | Arhatha | Devamma | |
| 1990 | Ee Kannikoodi | Annamma | |
| 1990 | Gajakesariyogam | Saroja Nair | |
| 1990 | His Highness Abdullah | Janaki Varma | Highest grossing Malayalam movie of the year |
| 1990 | Thoovalsparsham | Ananda Padmanabhan's mother | |
| 1990 | Kuruppinte Kanakku Pustakom | Subhadra | |
| 1990 | Minda Poochakku Kalyanam | Sarasamma | Also known as Ellaam Angayude Ishtam |
| 1990 | Nagarangalil Chennu Raparkam | Kunjulakshmi | |
| 1990 | Sasneham | Meenakshi Ammal | |
| 1990 | Thalayanamanthram | Sulochana Thankappan | Dubbed into Tamil as Thalayana Manthram |
| 1990 | Varthamana Kalam | Mrs. Menon | Dubbed into Tamil as Nigazh Kaalam |
| 1990 | Rajavazhcha | Mini's mother | |
| 1990 | Aye Auto | Meenakshi's grandmother | |
| 1990 | Shubhayathra | Hostel warden | |
| 1990 | Nanma Niranjavan Srinivasan | Peter's mother | |
| 1990 | Lal Salam | Servant of Medayil House | Dubbed into Telugu as Nayakudu |
| 1990 | Kadathanadan Ambadi | Unnichala | |
| 1990 | Maanmizhiyaal | Mariyaamma | |
| 1990 | Randam Varavu | | |
| 1991 | Anaswaram | D'Cruz's wife | Dubbed into Tamil as Ulagesh |
| 1991 | Advaitham | Saraswathy | |
| 1991 | Kilukkam | Doctor | Highest grossing Malayalam movie of the year Ran more than 300 days in theaters First Malayalam movie to collect 5 crores Kerala State Film Award for Best Cinematography |
| 1991 | Georgekutty C/O Georgekutty | Georgekutty's mother | |
| 1991 | Abhimanyu | Kalyani | Dubbed into Tamil as Arasan, Hindi as Satyaghath - Crime Never Pays and Hindi as Abhminyu |
| 1991 | Keli | Narayanankutty's grandmother | |
| 1991 | Kakka Thollayiram | Balakrishnan's mother | |
| 1991 | Sundhari Kakka | Rosy | |
| 1991 | Thudar Katha | Jaanuvamma | |
| 1991 | Vishnulokam | Vilasini Achuthan | |
| 1991 | Chakravarthy | Unni's mother | |
| 1991 | Ennum Nanmakal | Radha Devi's mother | |
| 1991 | Nettippattam | Mamma | |
| 1991 | Kadalora Kattu | Vijayan's mother | |
| 1991 | Ulladakkam | Mental patient | |
| 1991 | Uncle Bun | Sister 2 (Headmistress) | |
| 1991 | Kizhakkunarum Pakshi | Nimmy's mother | |
| 1991 | Khandakavyam | - | |
| 1991 | Manmadha Sarangal | | |
| 1991 | Mizhikal | | |
| 1992 | Welcome to Kodaikanal | Elizabeth Samuel | |
| 1992 | Adharam | Naniyamma | |
| 1992 | Ellarum Chollanu | Ramachandran's mother | |
| 1992 | Sathyaprathinja | Achuthan's mother | Dubbed into Telugu as Prathignya |
| 1992 | Makkal Mahatmyam | Subhadramma | |
| 1992 | Grihaprevesam | Kannan's mother | |
| 1992 | Kamaladalam | Dance teacher | |
| 1992 | First Bell | Yamuna's mother | |
| 1992 | Johnnie Walker | Mridula's mother | |
| 1992 | Kudumbasammetham | Rajamma | Kerala State Film Award for Second Best Film; Kerala State Film Award for Best Screenplay |
| 1992 | Yodha | Sumathi | Dubbed into Tamil as Asokan, Telugu as Yoddha, and Hindi as Dharam Yoddha |
| 1992 | Kaazhchakkppuram | Narayani | |
| 1992 | Kallan Kappalil Thanne | Subhamma | |
| 1992 | My Dear Muthachan | Parthasarathi's mother | |
| 1992 | Soorya Gayathri | Paatti | |
| 1992 | Thiruthalvaadi | Doctor | |
| 1992 | Apaaratha | Prabha's mother | |
| 1992 | Mr & Mrs | Superintendent | |
| 1992 | Ponnaramthottathe Raajaavu | Saraswathiyamma | |
| 1992 | Aardram | Mother Superior, Catherine | |
| 1992 | Maarathon | - | Also known as Aayaraam Gayaaraam |
| 1992 | Melvilasamillatha Manushyar | | |
| 1992 | Dhanurvedham | | |
| 1992 | Australia | | |
| 1992 | Upathiranjeduppu | | |
| 1992 | Kingini | | Also known as Kurinji Pookkunna Nerathu |
| 1992 | Sabarimalayil Thanka Sooryodayam | | |
| 1993 | Golanthara Vartha | Meenakshi Amma | Dubbed into Tamil as Thalaipu Seithigal |
| 1993 | Aayirappara | Mariya | Dubbed into Telugu as Ankuram |
| 1993 | Aagneyam | Bhageerathi | |
| 1993 | Injakkadan Mathai & Sons | Paulson's mother | |
| 1993 | Maya Mayooram | Lakshmikutty | |
| 1993 | Journalist | Viswanathan's mother | |
| 1993 | O' Faby | Slum lady | India's first live-action/animation hybrid film |
| 1993 | Butterflies | Sreedevi | |
| 1993 | Sthreedhanam | Vidya's mother | |
| 1993 | Kabooliwala | Amminiyamma | |
| 1993 | Mithunam | Swamini Amma | |
| 1993 | Addeham Enna Iddeham | Margaret | |
| 1993 | Samagamam | Joy's mother | |
| 1993 | Ghoshayaathra | Ibichu | Also known as Khalaasi |
| 1993 | Arthana | Priya's mother | |
| 1993 | Varam | Nileena's aunt | |
| 1993 | Aalavattam | Malu | |
| 1993 | Sakshal Sreeman Chathunni | Unni's mother | |
| 1993 | City Police | Sajan Mathew's mother | Dubbed into Telugu as Police Hecharika |
| 1993 | Gandharvam | Lady's Club Member | Dubbed as Aranmanai Kadhali |
| 1993 | Avan Ananthapadmanabhan | Ananthapadmanabhan's mother | |
| 1993 | Aparna | Rajeswari Amma | |
| 1993 | Paamaram | - | |
| 1993 | Padhavi | | |
| 1993 | Vairam | | |
| 1993 | Brahmadathan | | |
| 1994 | Gandheevam | Vijayan's mother | |
| 1994 | Bharya | Radhamani | |
| 1994 | Kashmeeram | Maria Singh | Dubbed into Telugu as New Delhi and Hindi as Commando |
| 1994 | Thenmavin Kombath | Ginjimood Gandhari | Kerala State Film Award for Best Popular Film; Highest grossing Malayalam movie of the year Ran more than 250 days in theaters National Film Award for Best Cinematography; National Film Award for Best Production Design |
| 1994 | Parinayam | Kunjikaliyamma | Kerala State Film Award for Best Film; National Film Award for Best Film on Other Social Issues; Kerala State Film Award for Best Screenplay; National Film Award for Best Screenplay |
| 1994 | Pakshe | Balachandran's mother | |
| 1994 | Pidakkozhi Koovunna Noottandu | Amalu | |
| 1994 | Chief Minister K. R. Gowthami | Bhanumathi | |
| 1994 | Varaphalam | Drama Artist, Rosy | |
| 1994 | Pavam I. A. Ivachan | Ivachan's mother | |
| 1994 | Sukham Sukhakaram | Parvathy | |
| 1995 | No. 1 Snehatheeram Bangalore North | School Principal | |
| 1995 | Mazhayethum Munpe | Mariamma | Kerala State Film Award for Best Popular Film; Kerala State Film Award for Best Screenplay |
| 1995 | Agnidevan | Kochammini | |
| 1995 | Karma | Yashoda | Dubbed into Telugu as Challenger |
| 1995 | Agrajan | Annamma Joseph | |
| 1995 | Alancheri Thamprakkal | Devaki | |
| 1995 | Kalyanji Anandji | Kalyanakrishnan's mother | |
| 1995 | Manikya Chempazhukka | Muthassi | |
| 1995 | Mannar Mathai Speaking | Gopalakrishnan's mother | |
| 1995 | Nirnayam | Dr. Annie's mother | |
| 1995 | Sreeragam | Venkiteswaran's mother | |
| 1995 | Thirumanassu | Nandan's mother | Also known as Thiruvithamkoor Thirumanassu |
| 1995 | Tom & Jerry | Balagopalan's mother | |
| 1995 | Saadaram | Lekha's mother | Dubbed into Tamil as Mr. Deva and Telugu as |
| 1995 | Highway | Vasco's mother | Dubbed into Hindi as Highway and Telugu as CBI Officer |
| 1995 | Achan Kombath Amma Varambath | Mariyamma | |
| 1995 | Simhavalan Menon | Drama Artist | |
| 1996 | Aayiram Naavulla Ananthan | Ananthan's mother | |
| 1996 | Kaathil Oru Kinnaram | Dakshayani | |
| 1996 | Swarna Kireedam | Nurse Santha | |
| 1996 | Lalanam | Vijayan's mother | |
| 1996 | Saamoohya Paadam | Bhavaniyamma | |
| 1996 | Harbour | Sunny's appachi | |
| 1996 | Yuvathurki | Sidhardha's mother | Dubbed into Telugu as Delhi Diary |
| 1996 | Aramana Veedum Anjoorekkarum | Gomathi | |
| 1996 | Mrs. Susanna Varma | | |
| 1996 | Kaalapani | | |
| 1996 | Naalamkettile Nalla Thampimar | Ramabhadran's mother | |
| 1997 | Oru Panchathanthram Katha | - | |
| 1997 | Chandralekha | Chandra's valiyamma | First Malayalam movie to collect 10 crores |
| 1997 | Rishyasringan | Poornima's mother | Dubbed into Tamil as I Love You Teacher |
| 1997 | Anubhoothi | Tomy's mother | |
| 1997 | Irattakuttikalude Achan | Gracy teacher | |
| 1997 | Bhoopathi | Maggie | |
| 1997 | Snehadooth | Kamalamma | |
| 1997 | Adukkala Rahasyam Angaadi Paattu | Jose's mother | |
| 1997 | Gajaraja Manthram | Ananthan's mother | |
| 1997 | Kalyana Unnikal | Maggy | |
| 1997 | Five Star Hospital | Subbalakshmi's mother | |
| 1997 | Krishnagudiyil Oru Pranayakalathu | Giri's mother | |
| 1997 | Snehasindooram | Aravindan's mother | |
| 1997 | Oral Mathram | | |
| 1998 | Amma Ammaayiyamma | Visalakshi | |
| 1998 | Chitrashalabham | Maria | |
| 1998 | Summer in Bethlahem | Ravishankar's grandmother | Dubbed into Telugu as Anthuleni Prayanam |
| 1998 | Nakshatratharattu | Hariharan's mother | |
| 1998 | Rakthasakshikal Sindabad | Subbulaxmi Amma | Dubbef into Telugu as Erra Samrajyam |
| 1998 | Meenakshi Kalyanam | Janaki | |
| 1998 | Oro Viliyum Kathorthu | Kalyani | |
| 1998 | Meenathil Thalikettu | Durga | |
| 1998 | Oru Maravathoor Kanavu | Annie's grandmother | Dubbed into Tamil as Maravathoor Kanavu |
| 1998 | Samaantharangal | Aishu | National Film Award for Best Film on Family Welfare |
| 1999 | Pathram | Vincent's mother | Dubbed into Telugu as Journalist and Tamil as Pathram |
| 1999 | Aakasha Ganga | Maanikkasheri Thampuratti, Kunjikavu | Dubbed into Hindi as Maaya Ka Saaya and Tamil as Avala Aaviya |
| 1999 | Chandranudikkunna Dikhil | Sreeram's mother | |
| 1999 | Friends | Aravindan's valiyamma | Highest grossing Malayalam movie of the year |
| 1999 | Independence | Pappamma | Dubbed into Hindi as Desh Ka Gaddar |
| 1999 | Saaphalyam | Subhadra | Dubbed into Telugu ad Abhiram |
| 1999 | Pallavur Devanarayanan | Seethalakshmi's peramma | |
| 1999 | Prem Poojari | Hema's paatti | Dubbed into Tamil as Vazhthukirean |
| 1999 | Olympiyan Anthony Adam | Bella mam | |
| 1999 | Pranayageetham | | |
| 1999 | Pushpull | | |
| 1999 | Megham | | |
| 1999 | Pranaya Nilavu | | |

=== 2000s ===
| Year | Film | Role | Notes |
|---|---|---|---|
| 2000 | Darling Darling | Sudha Warrier | |
| 2000 | Pilots | Mother Superior | |
| 2000 | Priyam | Joshua's mother | |
| 2000 | Vinayapoorvam Vidhyaadharan | Vidyadharan's mother | |
| 2000 | Valliettan | Kunjikavamma | Dubbed into Telugu as Pandava Samrajyam and Tamil as Periya Gounder |
| 2000 | Varavaay | Madhavi | |
| 2000 | Puraskaram | Balan's mother | |
| 2000 | Highrange | | |
| 2001 | Ravanaprabhu | Sakthivel Gounder's mother | Kerala State Film Award for Best Popular Film |
| 2001 | Narendran Makan Jayakanthan Vakan | Aishumma | |
| 2001 | Kakkakuyil | Savitri, Nambeeshan's wife | |
| 2001 | Rakshasa Rajav | Kasi | Dubbed into Telugu as Commissioner Rudrama Naidu, Hindi as Rough Tough and Dumdaar Commissioner, and Tamil as Commissioner Eeswar Pandiyan |
| 2001 | Praja | Bhanumathi, Appu's mother | Dubbed into Hindi as Peoples Dada and Tamil as Nammavar |
| 2001 | Randam Bhavam | Akhila's mother | Dubbed into Hindi as Jaan Pe Khelkar |
| 2002 | Nizhalkuthu | Marakatam, the executioner's wife | National Film Award for Best Feature Film in Malayalam; Kerala State Film Award for Best Cinematography |
| 2002 | Meesha Madhavan | Madhavan's mother | Highest grossing Malayalam movie of the year |
| 2002 | Kanmashi | Kanmashi's paatti | Dubbed into Telugu as Kamakshi |
| 2002 | Mazhathullikkilukkam | Kikkili Kochamma | |
| 2002 | Snehithan | Malavika's grandmother | |
| 2003 | Sheethakattu | Sr.Agnes | Short film |
| 2003 | Gaurisankaram | Sankaran's aunt | |
| 2003 | Manassinakkare | Shanthamma | |
| 2003 | Ammakilikkoodu | Parvathy Ammal | Dubbed into Tamil as Paasa Mozhi |
| 2003 | Mizhi Randilum | Bhadra's mother | |
| 2003 | Pattalam | Pattabhiraman's mother | |
| 2003 | C.I.D. Moosa | Sahadevan's mother | |
| 2003 | Kilichundan Mampazham | Beeyathu | |
| 2003 | Sadanandante Samayam | Kalyani | |
| 2004 | Rasikan | Bhargaviyamma | |
| 2004 | Vettam | Reetha Tom | Dubbed into Tamil as Vaira Malai |
| 2004 | Wanted | Unni's mother | |
| 2004 | Vismayathumbathu | Hostel warden | |
| 2004 | Symphony | Deenamma | |
| 2004 | Koottu | Balagopal's grandmother | |
| 2004 | Priyam Priyamkaram | Vinu's grandmother | |
| 2004 | Vellinakshatram | | |
| 2004 | Perumazhakkalam | | |
| 2004 | Jalolsavam | | |
| 2005 | Chanthupottu | Radhakrishnan's grandmother | |
| 2005 | Pandippada | Ponnammal | |
| 2005 | Ben Johnson | Gouri's grandmother | Dubbed into Odia and Hindi with the same title |
| 2005 | Kalyana Kurimanam | Madhaviyamma | |
| 2005 | Pauran | Minister | |
| 2005 | Alice in Wonderland | Bridget | Dubbed into Telugu as Premalo Anjali Geetha Krishna |
| 2005 | Achuvinte Amma | Moothamma | Kerala State Film Award for Best Popular Film |
| 2005 | Hridayathil Sookshikkan | | |
| 2006 | Balram vs. Tharadas | Alex's mother | Dubbed into Telugu as Monica and Hindi as Basha: The Boss |
| 2006 | The Don | Devakiyamma | Dubbed into Tamil as Kuttram Thandanai |
| 2006 | Classmates | Sukumaran's mother | Kerala State Film Award for Best Popular Film; Highest grossing Malayalam movie of the year Kerala State Film Award for Best Story |
| 2006 | Madhuchandralekha | Chandramathi's grandmother | Dubbed into Telugu and Tamil as Madhuchandralekha |
| 2006 | Chakkaramuthu | | |
| 2006 | Chinthamani Kolacase | | |
| 2007 | Nasrani | Annammachedathi | Dubbed into Telugu as Ajatha Satruvu and Tamil as Deivam |
| 2007 | Raakilipattu | History professor & Hostel warden | Dubbed into Hindi as Friendship |
| 2007 | Paranju Theeratha Visheshangal | Rajeevan's mother | Dubbed into Tamil as Raghavan |
| 2007 | Kangaroo | Josekutty's mother | |
| 2007 | Payum Puli | Mallika's grandmother | Dubbed into Tamil as Puliyattam, Telugu as Evidaina Sare and Hindi as Tiger Shiva |
| 2007 | Nanma | Paatti | Dubbed in Tamil as Paraimedu |
| 2008 | De Ingottu Nokkiye | Ammu | |
| 2008 | Mulla | Akka | Dubbed into Telugu as Doravari Satram and Tamil as Malleswaran |
| 2008 | Twenty:20 | Leelamma | Highest grossing Malayalam movie of the year First Malayalam movie to collect 25 & 30 crores |
| 2008 | Kurukshetra | Fussy's mother | Dubbed into Hindi as Aaj Ka Kurukshetra |
| 2008 | Oru Pennum Randaanum | Bhageerathi (Narrator) | Segment: "Pankiyamma"; Kerala State Film Award for Best Film; Kerala State Film Award for Best Screenplay |
| 2008 | Mizhikal Sakshi | Kooniamma/Nabisa | Dubbed into Tamil as Vizhigal Satchi and Kannada as Shakshi |
| 2008 | Pachamarathanalil | Nun | |
| 2008 | Pakal Nakshatrangal | | |
| 2009 | Loudspeaker | Head Nurse | |
| 2009 | Red Chillies | Mani Varghese's wife | |
| 2009 | Bharya Swantham Suhruthu | Mother Superior | |
| 2009 | Love In Singapore | Diana's aunt | |
| 2009 | Kana Kanmani | Maya's grandmother | |
| 2009 | Seetha Kalyanam | Abhirami's mother | Dubbed into Tamil as Seetha Kalyanam |
| 2009 | Evidam Swargamanu | Rahelamma | Kerala State Film Award for Best Popular Film |
| 2009 | Utharaswayamvaram | Uthara's grandmother | |
| 2009 | Kerala Cafe | Narayani | Segment: "Island Express" |
| 2009 | Women in Malayalam Cinema | Herself | Documentary |
| 2009 | Dr. Patient | | |

=== 2010s ===
| Year | Film | Role | Notes |
|---|---|---|---|
| 2010 | Kausthubham | Yamuna's mother | |
| 2010 | 3 Char Sau Bees | Selvan's grandmother | Dubbed into Tamil as Thiruttu Pasangal |
| 2010 | Four Friends | Amir's grandmother | Dubbed into Tamil as Anbulla Kamal and Telugu as Four Friends |
| 2010 | Thoovalkattu | Sundaran's mother | |
| 2010 | Best Actor | Mother Superior | |
| 2010 | Jayan, the Man behind the Legend | Herself | Documentary movie Uncredited appearance (photos only) |
| 2010 | Yughapurushan | | |
| 2011 | Naayika | Sukumari (herself) | |
| 2011 | Bangkok Summer | Paatti | |
| 2011 | Maharaja Talkies | Vimala's aunt | |
| 2011 | Ven Shankhu Pol | Sulochana | Also known as Ekadasi |
| 2011 | Khaddama | Razak's mother | Dubbed into Tamil as Palaivana Roja, Hindi as Khaddama and Telugu as Panjaram |
| 2011 | Ninnishtam Ennishtam 2 | Kaakkathiyamma | |
| 2011 | Priyappetta Nattukare | Vilasini | |
| 2011 | Kathayile Nayika | Annamma | |
| 2011 | Swapnamalika | Appu's grandmother | |
| 2011 | Kattu Paranja Katha | Rajammal | |
| 2011 | Pakida Pakida Pandhrande | | |
| 2011 | Oru Marubhoomikkadha | | |
| 2011 | Naale | | |
| 2011 | Adhithyan | | |
| 2011 | The Train | | |
| 2011 | Manushyamrugham | | |
| 2012 | Ayalum Njanum Thammil | Sister Lucy | Kerala State Film Award for Best Popular Film |
| 2012 | Karmayodha | Mad Maddy's mother | Dubbed into Tamil as Vetrimaaran IPS |
| 2012 | Doctor Innocent aanu | Noorjahan | |
| 2012 | Chattakaari | Margerette | |
| 2012 | Ardhanaari | Priest (Thayamma) | Also known as Ivan Ardhanaari |
| 2012 | Karppooradeepam | Bhavani | |
| 2012 | Lakshmi Vilasam Renuka Makan Raghuram | Renuka's grandmother | |
| 2012 | Trivandrum Lodge | Peggy | |
| 2012 | Diamond Necklace | Rajasree's grandmother | Dubbed into Tamil as Diamond Necklace |
| 2012 | Graamam | Ammini Amma | Kerala State Film Award for Best Story; National Film Award for Best Costume Design |
| 2012 | Lumiere Brothers | Herself | Archive footage from Chakkikotha Chankaran |
| 2012 | Yaadharthyam | - | |
| 2012 | Vilappilshala | | |
| 2012 | Aayiram Kannumayi | | |
| 2012 | Masters | | |
| 2013 | Oronanalil | - | Short film |
| 2013 | Ayaal | Thevichi (Old village lady) | Posthumously released Kerala State Film Award for Best Cinematography; Also known as Nagabandham |
| 2013 | August Club | Bhagavati Amma | Posthumously released Also known as August Club Since 1969; Earlier titled as Venalinte Kalaneekkanga' |
| 2013 | Mumbai Police | Cameo | Posthumously released |
| 2013 | Hotel California | Rafeeq's mother | Posthumously released |
| 2013 | Immanuel | Khadeejumma | Posthumously released |
| 2013 | Progress Report | Bhagyalakshmi Ammal | Posthumously released Dubbed into Tamil as Thalaiyazuthu Meiyazuthu |
| 2013 | SIM | Seetharama Iyer's Paatti | Posthumously released |
| 2013 | Cleopatra | Ramdas's mother | Posthumously released |
| 2013 | 3G Third Generation | Devoottiamma | Posthumously released |
| 2013 | Black Butterfly | Old orphan lady | |
| 2013 | Proprietors: Kammath & Kammath | Surekha's grandmother | Dubbed into Hindi as Proprietors: Kammath & Kammath |
| 2013 | Breaking News Live | Madhavi | |
| 2013 | David & Goliath | Kurisamma | |
| 2013 | Rebecca Uthup Kizhakkemala | Annamma | |
| 2013 | Oru Yathrayil | Sathyamma | Segment: "Amma" |
| 2013 | Good Idea | - | |
| 2013 | Njaan Anaswaran | | |
| 2013 | Romans | | |
| 2013 | Nadodimannan | | |
| 2014 | Mannar Mathai Speaking 2 | Balakrishnan's mother | Cameo in the title song Shot from Mannar Mathai Speaking; Archive footage |
| 2014 | Kadalkaattiloru Dooth/Ode of Ocean | Herself | Documentary movie Uncredited appearance (photos only) |
| 2014 | Tharangal | Herself | Photo archive Posthumously released |
| 2014 | Marching Ahead | The Element of Life | Documentary film |
| 2015 | Kukkiliyar | Sudhi's mother | Posthumously released |
| 2015 | Mathru Vandhanam | Saraswathi Ammal | Posthumously released Also known as Rajuvum Ammayum |
| 2015 | Mayapuri 3D | Adithyan's grandmother | Posthumously released Dubbed into Hindi as Mayapuri 3D |
| 2018 | Mohanalal | Herself | Archive footage from Dasharatham; Posthumously released |
| 2019 | Aakasha Ganga 2 | Maanikkasheri Thampuratti | Photo archive from Aakasha Ganga; Posthumously released |
| 2019 | Thanka Bhasma Kuriyitta Thamburatti | Herself | Photo archive Posthumously released |

== Tamil ==
| Year | Film | Role | Notes |
|---|---|---|---|
| 1951 | Or Iravu | Young Shyamala | Special appearance in a song sequence |
| 1952 | Velaikkaran | | |
| 1952 | Dharma Devatha | | |
| 1953 | Ponni | Dancer | |
| 1953 | Anbu | | |
| 1954 | Malaikkallan | | |
| 1955 | Gomathiyin Kaadalan | Dancer | |
| 1955 | Kaveri | | |
| 1956 | Madurai Veeran | Bommi's friend | Dubbed into Telugu as Sahasaveerudu |
| 1956 | Raja Rani | Dancer | |
| 1957 | Chakravarthi Thirumagal | Dancer | |
| 1957 | Mallika | Dancer /Friend | |
| 1957 | Manamagan Thevai | Stage Dancer | |
| 1957 | Pudhaiyal | Dancer/Kannamma/Companion | |
| 1958 | Sengottai Singam | Dancer | |
| 1958 | Sampoorna Ramayanam | Kalyana Seetha | Dubbed into Telugu; Dubbed into Hindi as Ramayana |
| 1958 | Maya Manithan | Dancer at party | |
| 1958 | Neelavukku Neranja Manasu | Thammana | |
| 1958 | Manamalai | Dancer | |
| 1958 | Vanji-Kottai Valipan | | Crew member |
| 1959 | Veerapandiya Kattabomman | Dancer | Dubbed into Telugu as Veerapandiya Kattabrahmanna and Hindi as Amar Shaheedd; National Film Award for Best Feature Film in Tamil; Highest grossing Tamil movie of the year |
| 1959 | Pennkulathin Ponvilakku | Dancer | |
| 1959 | Manjal Mahimai | Street Dancer | |
| 1959 | Ponnu Vilayum Bhoomi | Kala | |
| 1959 | Amudhavalli | Tribal dancer | |
| 1960 | Mannadhi Mannan | Chithra's thozhi | |
| 1960 | Pudhiya Pathai | Dancer | |
| 1960 | Ondrupattal Undu Vazhvu | Dancer | |
| 1960 | Uthami Petra Rathinam | Dancer | |
| 1960 | Pattaliyin Vetri | Snake Dancer | |
| 1960 | Raja Desingu | Ranibhai's thozhi | |
| 1960 | Petraval Kanda Peruvazhvu | | |
| 1960 | Irumanam Kalanthal Thirumanam | | |
| 1961 | Pasamalar | Dancer/Radha's friend | National Film Award for Best Feature Film in Tamil |
| 1961 | Kappalottiya Thamizhan | | |
| 1962 | Bandha Pasam | Chithra | Dubbed into Telugu as Aadharsha Saadharalu |
| 1962 | Kannadi Maaligai | Latha | Dubbed into Telugu as Addala Meda |
| 1962 | Senthamarai | | |
| 1963 | Kalyaniyin Kanavan | Lord Ramar Dhrama (Dance drama artist/Anchor) | |
| 1963 | Lava Kusa | Dancer | Dubbed into Kannada and Hindi with the same title |
| 1963 | Kadavulai Kanden | Lilly | |
| 1964 | Rishyasringar | Dancer | |
| 1964 | Veeranganai | | |
| 1967 | Manam Oru Kurangu | | |
| 1967 | Engalkkum Kaalam Varum | | |
| 1971 | Muhammad bin Tughluq | Sumathi | |
| 1971 | Nootrukku Nooru | Manjula's mother | |
| 1971 | Thoraimugham | | |
| 1972 | Pattikada Pattanama | Bama | National Film Award for Best Feature Film in Tamil |
| 1972 | Vasantha Maligai | Vimala | |
| 1972 | Mr.Sampath | Annai Seva Sangam Member | |
| 1972 | Kannamma | Elsy | |
| 1972 | Unakkum Enakkum | Dr.Kalavathi | |
| 1973 | Maru Piravi | Meenakshi | |
| 1973 | Thirumalai Deivam | Dharanidevi | |
| 1973 | Pillai Selvam | Swarnamma | |
| 1973 | Malligai Poo | Sivakami | |
| 1973 | Shanmugapriya | Meenakshi | |
| 1973 | Nalla Mudivu | Kaaliyamma | |
| 1973 | Vayadi | Shivakami Somasundaram | |
| 1974 | Engamma Sapatham | Lakshmi | |
| 1974 | Athaiya Mamiya | Jayalakshmi | |
| 1974 | Netru Indru Naalai | Dayalan's wife | |
| 1974 | Thirumangalyam | Pattamma | |
| 1974 | Thaai | Mangalam | |
| 1974 | Raja Nagam | Alamelu's mother | |
| 1974 | Kalyanamam Kalyanam | Muththu's Amma | |
| 1974 | Paadha Poojai | Parvathy | |
| 1974 | Pen Onndru Kanden | Siva's mother | |
| 1974 | Tiger Thaathachari | Uma | |
| 1974 | Thai Pirandhal | Doctor | |
| 1975 | Aayirathil Oruthi | Jailer of Police | Dubbed into Telugu as Intini Didina Illalu |
| 1975 | Pattum Bharathamum | Meenakshi Ammal | |
| 1975 | Manidhanum Dheivamagalam | Kaveri | |
| 1975 | Anbe Aaruyire | Janaki | |
| 1975 | Swami Ayyappan | Lakshmi | Dubbed into Telugu Swami Ayyappa |
| 1975 | Andharangam | Madurai Marathakam | Dubbed into Telugu as Andhala Raja |
| 1975 | Mannavan Vanthaanadi | Parvathy | |
| 1975 | Thiruvarul | Valli's mother | |
| 1975 | Then Sindhudhe Vaanam | Pankacham | |
| 1975 | Yarukkum Vetkam Illai | | |
| 1975 | Anaya Vilakku | Azhagappan's mother | |
| 1975 | Yezhaikkum Kaalam Varum | Rajalakshmiyamma | |
| 1976 | Kumara Vijayam | Parvathy | |
| 1976 | Mogam Muppadhu Varusham | Kamala | |
| 1976 | Kanavan Manaivi | Renganayagi | |
| 1976 | Rojavin Raja | Amritham | |
| 1976 | Payanam | Nun | |
| 1976 | Lalitha | Meenakshi | |
| 1976 | Bhadrakali | Ganeshan's mother | |
| 1976 | Unmaiye Un Vilai Enna? | Pankajam | |
| 1976 | Sila Nerangalil Sila Manithargal | Ganesan's wife | Dubbed into Malayalam as Chila Nerangalil Chila Manushyar |
| 1976 | Paalooti Valartha Kili | Gayathri's mother | |
| 1976 | Thayilla Kuzhandhai | School teacher | |
| 1976 | Maharasi Vazhga | Mother of Sarannalayam | |
| 1976 | Perum Pugazhum | Opposition candidate/ Former chairperson | |
| 1976 | Veedu Varai Uravu | Kamalam Chidambaram | |
| 1977 | Nallathukku Kalamillai | Panju's mother | |
| 1977 | Nee Vazhva Vendum | Shivakami | |
| 1977 | Sorgam Naragam | Balu's mother | |
| 1977 | Punniyam Seithaval | Mangalathamma | |
| 1977 | Sonnathai Seiven | | |
| 1978 | Kaatrinile Varum Geetham | Mrs. David (Rosy's mother) | |
| 1978 | Oru Nadigai Natakam Parkiral | Doctor | |
| 1978 | Thai Meethu Sathiyam | Babu's mother | Dubbed into Hindi as Zahreele Saanp |
| 1978 | Andaman Kadhali | Thayamma | |
| 1978 | Mudisooda Mannan | Maharani (Vikraman's mother) | |
| 1978 | Seervarisai | Andalamma | |
| 1978 | Adhirstakaran | Kamakshi | |
| 1978 | Radhai Ketra Kannan | Radha's mother | |
| 1978 | Annapoorani | Meenakshiyamma | |
| 1978 | Paruva Mazhai | - | |
| 1978 | Karunai Ullam | | |
| 1979 | Sigappukkal Mookkuthi | Janaki's mother in law | |
| 1979 | Pagalil Oru Iravu | Rajamma | Dubbed into Telugu as Nuvve Naa Srimathi |
| 1979 | Allaudinaum Arputha Vilakkum | Ayishaumma | Dubbed into Hindi as Aladdin and the Wonderful Lamp and Telugu as Alavuthinum Arputha Deepam |
| 1979 | Neela Malargal | Kamakshi | Dubbed into Hindi as Neel Kamal |
| 1979 | Thaayillamal Naan Illai | Sivakami | Dubbed into Telugu as Paatagadu and Hindi as Aakhri Sangram |
| 1979 | Sri Rama Jayam | Sreeraman's mother | |
| 1979 | Kamasasthiram | Geetha's aunt | |
| 1979 | Nenjukke Neethi | - | |
| 1979 | Siri Siri Mama | - | |
| 1979 | Kaathalikka 90 Naal | - | |
| 1980 | Sujatha | Sujatha's chinnamma | |
| 1980 | Devi Dharisanam | Kalyani's mother | |
| 1980 | Oomai Kanavu Kandal | Meenaxi | |
| 1980 | Andharangam Oomaiyanathu | Raaju's mother | |
| 1980 | Kuruvikoodu | Meenakshi | |
| 1980 | Kaalam Badhil Sollum | Meena Rajadevar | |
| 1981 | Kadal Meengal | Annapoorni | Dubbed in Telugu as Rangoon Raja and Hindi as Baap Bete |
| 1981 | Amara Kaaviyam | Saraswathi | |
| 1981 | Garjanai | Dr. Vijay's mother | Dubbed into Hindi as Hum Nahi Jhukenge |
| 1981 | Kilinjalgal | Stella | |
| 1981 | Valibame Va Va | | |
| 1982 | Pudukavithai | Thilakavathy | Dubbed into Telugu as Tiger Rajani |
| 1982 | Vazhvey Maayam | Raja's mother | Dubbed into Malayalam as Premabhishekam and Hindi as Chandramukhi Devdas |
| 1982 | Thunai | Radha's mother | |
| 1982 | Marumagale Vazhga | Akhilandam | |
| 1982 | Nirantharam | Seetha Lakshmi | |
| 1982 | Punitha Malar | Parvathi | |
| 1983 | Ilamai Kaalangal | Stella's mother | |
| 1985 | Mangamma Sapatham | Ashok's mother | Dubbed into Malayalam as Randum Randum Anchu |
| 1985 | Poove Poochooda Vaa | David's mother | |
| 1985 | Kalyanam Oru Kaal Kattu | | |
| 1987 | Idhu Oru Thodar Kathai | Ravi's mother | |
| 1987 | Chinnamanikkuyile | | |
| 1989 | Varusham Padhinaaru | Parvathy | |
| 1990 | Arangetra Velai | Asha's mother | Dubbed into Telugu as Hello Pakiram |
| 1990 | Mounam Sammadham | Sundar's mother in law | Dubbed into Telugu as Lawyer the Great, Hindi as Dharmadhikari and Malayalam as Mounam Sammadham |
| 1991 | Gopura Vasalile | Manohar's mother | |
| 1991 | Putham Pudhu Payanam | Selvi's paatti | |
| 1992 | Mughavariyatta Manithar | | |
| 1994 | Manasu Rendum Pudhusu | Meenakshi | |
| 1994 | Ipadikku Kaadhal | Parvathy | |
| 1994 | Paasamalargal | Orphanage care taker | Dubbed into Malayalam as Suryaputhrikal |
| 1995 | Raja Muthirai | Rajkumar's mother | |
| 1996 | Poove Unakkaga | Stephen's wife | Dubbed into Hindi as Manzil Pyaar Ki |
| 1997 | Ratchagan | Sonia's paatti | Dubbed into Telugu as Rakshakudu |
| 1997 | Kathirunda Kadhal | Kannamma's guardian | |
| 1998 | Kodiesvaran | | |
| 1999 | Ponvizha | | |
| 2000 | Alai Payuthey | Shakthi's aunt | Dubbed into Telugu as Sakhi and Malayalam as Alai Payuthey |
| 2000 | Snegithiye | History professor & Hostel warden | Dubbed into Hindi as Friendship and Kannada as Yen Hudgiro Yaking Hadthiro |
| 2000 | Unnai Kann Theduthey | Ranganayaki | |
| 2001 | Poovellam Un Vasam | Chella's grandmother | Tamil Nadu State Film Award for Best Family Film (Second Prize) |
| 2001 | Vinnukum Mannukum | Devayani's mother (Shakthi) | Dubbed into Telugu as Nata |
| 2002 | Varushamellam Vasantham | Meenakshi | |
| 2002 | Pammal K. Sambandam | Alaram Maami (Janaki's relative) | Dubbed into Telugu as Brahmachari and Malayalam as Pammal K. Sambandam |
| 2004 | Manasthan | Selvarasu's paatti | Dubbed into Telugu as Peda Raja |
| 2004 | Vishwa Thulasi | Viswa's mother | |
| 2004 | Perazhagan | Priya's grandmother | Dubbed into Telugu as Sundarangudu |
| 2005 | Aadum Koothu | Aachi | National Film Award for Best Feature Film in Tamil |
| 2007 | Agaram | Thiru's grandmother | |
| 2008 | Vambu Sandai | Jeevanandham's mother | Dubbed into Hindi as Mr. Badmash |
| 2008 | Yaaradi Nee Mohini | Saradha (Keerthi's grandmother) | Dubbed into Hindi as Phir Aaya Deewana |
| 2008 | Sila Nerangalil | Mother Superior | |
| 2009 | Vettaikaaran | Susheela's grandmother | Dubbed into Hindi as Dangerous Khiladi 3, Telugu as Puli Veta and Bhojouri as Khilladi Ka Challenge |
| 2010 | Chikku Bukku | Sekhar's grandmother | Dubbed into Telugu as Love To Love |
| 2010 | Magizhchi | Aachi | |
| 2011 | Ponnar Shankar | Vaanayi | Dubbed into Hindi as Prashanth Veer, Telugu as Rajakota Rahasyam and Bhojpuri as Ponnar Shankar |
| 2012 | UAA 60 - 60 Years of Passion | Sukumari (herself) | Documentary film |
| 2013 | Maiyam Konden | | |
| 2014 | Namma Gramam | Ammini Amma | National Film Award for Best Supporting Actress; Tamil Nadu State Film Award Special Prize - Best Film; Posthumously released |
| 2016 | Makkal Thilagam MGR 100 | Sukumari Bhimsingh (herself) | Documentary film |

== Telugu ==
| Year | Film | Role | Notes |
|---|---|---|---|
| 1952 | Dharma Devatha | | |
| 1953 | Oka Talli Pillalu | Dancer | |
| 1957 | Varudu Kaavaali | Stage Dancer | |
| 1959 | Mangalya Balam | Street Dancer | National Film Award for Best Feature Film in Telugu |
| 1960 | Bhatti Vikramarka | Palace Dancer | Dubbed into Hindi as Chakravarty Vikramaditya and Tamil as Patti Vikramathithan |
| 1960 | Nammina Bantu | Naga Dancer | National Film Award for Best Feature Film in Telugu |
| 1960 | Kumkuma Rekha | Kalashala Nartaki | |
| 1960 | Rani Ratnaprabha | | |
| 1960 | Rushya Srunga | | |
| 1961 | Pellikani Pillalu | Dancer | |
| 1961 | Thandrulu Kodukulu | | |
| 1961 | Sri Krishna Kuchela | | |
| 1962 | Dakshayagnam | Rambha | Dubbed into Tamil as Dakshayagnam |
| 1962 | Mohini Rukmangada | | |
| 1962 | Kalimilemulu | | |
| 1963 | Aapta Mitrulu | Dancer | |
| 1963 | Lava Kusa | Dancer | Dubbed into Kannada and Hindi with the same title National Film Award for Best Feature Film in Telugu |
| 1967 | Dhanyame Dhanalakshmi | | |
| 1969 | Rajya Kanksha | | |
| 1972 | Muhammad bin Tughluq | Meenakshi | |
| 1973 | Vaade Veedu | ? | |
| 1973 | Palletoori Bava | Deepalakshmi | |
| 1975 | Babu | Sreelakshmi | |
| 1975 | Ammayila Sapatham | Laxmi Gopal Rao | |
| 1976 | Bangaru Manishi | Shantha Devi | |
| 1977 | Bhadrakali | ? | |
| 1980 | Sita Ramulu | Ramu's mother | |
| 1980 | Sannayi Appanna | Rangamma | |
| 1981 | Premabhishekam | ? | |
| 1981 | Aggi Ravva | Vani's aunt | |
| 1981 | Sri Anjaneya Charitra | Anjana Devi | |
| 1981 | Viswaroopam | Malathamma (Viswa's mother) | |
| 1981 | Srivari Muchatlu | Gopi's mother | |
| 1981 | Nayudu Gari Abbai | Nandi (Madhavi's mother) | |
| 1982 | Golconda Abbulu | Mother Superior | |
| 1982 | Jayasudha | Sudhakar's mother | |
| 1982 | Chandamama | | |
| 1983 | Ramudu Kadu Krishnudu | Lakshmi | |
| 1985 | Bangaru Chilaka | Kousalya Devi | |
| 1991 | Nirnayam | Jolly aunty | Dubbed into Tamil as Sambhavam and Hindi as Girafthari |
| 1997 | Subhakankshalu | Rosy | |
| 1997 | Rukmini | Rukumini's Naanamma | |
| 2001 | Murari | Sabari | Dubbed into Tamil as Murari and Hindi as Rowdy Cheetah |
| 2004 | Samba | Samba's grandmother | Dubbed into Hindi and Tamil as Samba |
| 2008 | Lakshmi Putrudu | Lakshmi Narayana's mother | |
| 2011 | Kudirithe Kappu Coffee | Malati | |
| 2016 | Savitri | Unmentioned | Photo archive |
| 2018 | Baba Sathya Sai | Devotee | Posthumously released |

== Kannada ==
| Year | Film | Role | Notes |
|---|---|---|---|
| 1959 | Abba Aa Hudugi | Dancer | Dubbed into Tamil as Mangaikku Maangalyame Pradhaanam |
| 1981 | Garjane | Vijay and Rekha's mother | |

== Hindi ==
| Year | Film | Role | Notes |
|---|---|---|---|
| 1951 | Rajput | | |
| 1957 | Payal | Dancer/passenger on the train | |
| 1958 | Lajwanti | Dancer | National Film Award for Best Feature Film in Hindi |
| 1979 | Daisy | | |
| 1986 | Anokha Rishta | Robert's mother | Reprised her role from Kanamarayathu |
| 1998 | Kabhi Na Kabhi | Jaggu's mother | Dubbed into Tamil as Monalisa |
| 1998 | Saat Rang Ke Sapne | Rampyari Devi (Yashoda's sister-in-law) | Reprised her role from Thenmavin Kombathu |
| 2007 | Friendship | | |

== English ==
| Year | Film | Role | Notes |
|---|---|---|---|
| 2014 | Marching Ahead | The Element of Life | Documentary film |

== French ==
| Year | Film | Role | Notes |
|---|---|---|---|
| 1969 | Things Seen in Madras 1969 - L' Inde Fantôme - Phantom India | Drama actress | Documentary |

== Bengali ==
| Year | Film | Role | Notes |
|---|---|---|---|
| 1958 | Nrityeri Tale Tale | Dancer | |

== Sinhala ==
| Year | Film | Role | Notes |
|---|---|---|---|
| 1957 | Siriyalatha | - | Movie directed by S.S. Rajan |

== Voice Artist/Extra Dubbing Credits ==
| Year | Film | Character | Dubbed for | Notes |
|---|---|---|---|---|
| 2020 | Paasa Mozhi | Parvathy Ammal | Herself | Dubbed project Used her voice partly Original title: Ammakilikkoodu |
| 2012 | Swami Ayyappan | | —N/a | Animation movie |
| 2005 | Alai Payuthey | Shakthi's aunt | Herself | Dubbed project Rendered her voice itself (Tamil to Malayalam); Original title: Alai Payuthey |
| 2002 | Pammal K. Sambandam | Orphanage administrator. | Herself | Dubbed project Rendered her voice itself (Tamil to Malayalam); Original title: Pammal K. Sambandam |
| 2001 | Vazhthukirean | Hema's paatti | Herself | Dubbed project Rendered her voice itself (Malayalam to Tamil); Original title: Prem Poojari |
| 1990 | Bagawan | Soorya's mother | Herself | Dubbed project Used her voice partly Original title: Iyer the Great |
| 1987 | Cheppu | Ramachandran's mother | —N/a | Voice over Malayalam movie |
| 1986 | Sippikul Muthu | Durgamma | Y. Vijaya | Tamil dubbed version of Swathi Muthyam |
| 1985 | Randum Randum Anchu | Ashok's mother | Herself | Dubbed project Rendered her voice itself (Tamil to Malayalam); Original title: Mangamma Sapatham |
| 1982 | Premabhishekam | Rajasekaran's mother | Herself | Dubbed project Rendered her voice itself (Tamil to Malayalam); Original title: Vazhvey Maayam |
| 1980 | Raam Bhaktha Hanuman | Anjana Devi | Herself | Dubbed project Used her voice partly Original title: Bhaktha Hanuman |

== Television serials (Partial list) ==
| Year | Title | Channel | Role | Language | Notes |
|---|---|---|---|---|---|
| 2020 | Amma | Kairali TV | Mother Superior | Malayalam | Untelecasted on TV; YouTube release 2020 |
| 2013 | Hai | Malayalam TV | Omana | Malayalam | |
| 2012 | Malakhamar | Mazhavil Manorama | Devakiyamma | Malayalam | |
| 2012 | Daivathinu Swantham Devootty | Mazhavil Manorama | Devootty's grandmother | Malayalam | |
| 2011-2013 | Akashadoothu (TV series) | Surya TV | Brigithamma | Malayalam | Relaunched in 2020 |
| 2010-2012 | Swamiye Saranamayyappa | Surya TV | Manikandan's grandmother | Malayalam | |
| 2010 | Swamiye Saranam Ayyappa | Vijay TV | Ayyappan's grandmother | Tamil | |
| 2010 | Amme Devi | Surya TV | - | Malayalam | Acted with Namitha Pramod |
| 2010 | Swami Ayyappan Saranam | Asianet | Varassiar, Govindan's mother | Malayalam | |
| 2009-2010 | Thulabharam | Surya TV | - | Malayalam | Acted with Suresh Krishna |
| 2009 | Coimbatore Ammayi | Amrita TV | Visalakshi/Ammayi | Malayalam | |
| 2008 | Aliyanmarum Penganmarum | Amrita TV | Muthassi | Malayalam | Acted with Chippy |
| 2008-2010 | Sree Mahabhaghavatham | Asianet | Lakshmi Amma | Malayalam | |
| 2007-2009 | Sreeguruvaaoorappan | Surya TV | Narayanan Nampoothiri's mother (Antharjanam) | Malayalam | Relaunched in 2020 |
| 2007-2009 | Velankani Mathavu | Surya TV | Ammaamma | Malayalam | Relaunched in 2020 |
| 2007-2008 | Nombarappoovu | Asianet | Amma | Malayalam | |
| 2007 | Madhavam | Surya TV | Oppamma | Malayalam | |
| 2007 | Sathyam | Amrita TV | Ammalu Amma | Malayalam | |
| 2006-2008 | Swami Ayyappan | Asianet | - | Malayalam | DVD version |
| 2006 | Sasneham | Amrita TV | Seethalakshmi's grandmother | Malayalam | |
| 2006 | Swarnamayooram | Asianet | Sreedeviyamma | Malayalam | Acted with Priya Raman |
| 2006 | Ammathamburaatti | Asianet | | Malayalam | |
| 2006 | Amma Manassu | Asianet | | Malayalam | |
| 2005-2006 | Thalolam | Asianet | - | Malayalam | |
| 2005-2006 | Manthrakodi | Asianet | - | Malayalam | Acted with Reshmi Soman |
| 2005-2006 | Indumukhi Chandramathi | Surya TV | Priyamvadha & Mallakshi Amma | Malayalam | Dual role Dubbed into Tamil |
| 2005 | Nokketha Doorath | Asianet | | Malayalam | |
| 2004-2005 | Kadamattathu Kathanar | Asianet | Dhathri | Malayalam | Relaunched in 2016 |
| 2004-2005 | Dambathya Geethangal | Asianet | - | Malayalam | Acted with Dr. Shaju |
| 2004 | Avicharitham | Asianet | | Malayalam | Relaunched in 2020 |
| 2004 | Megham | Asianet | Rukkuvamma | Malayalam | |
| 2004 | Vikramadithyan | Asianet | Rajamatha | Malayalam | |
| 2004 | Ashtapadi | Surya TV | - | Malayalam | |
| 2003-2004 | Swapnam | Asianet | - | Malayalam | Acted with Anoop Menon |
| 2003 | Swantham Malootty | Surya TV | - | Malayalam | Acted with Sujitha |
| 2003 | Appa | Sun TV | - | Tamil | |
| 2002 | Alaigal | Sun TV | Dakshayani Amma | Tamil | |
| 2001 | Sankeerthanam Pole | Asianet | - | Malayalam | Acted with Sindhu Menon |
| 2001 | Makal Marumagal | Surya TV | - | Malayalam | Acted with Reshmi Soman |
| 2001 | Sapathni | Asianet | - | Malayalam | |
| 2001-2002 | Akshayapathram | Asianet | - | Malayalam | |
| 2001-2003 | Sthree Janmam | Surya TV | - | Malayalam | |
| 2001 | Kaliyalla Kalyaanam | Kairali TV | Double role | Malayalam | Directed by Balu Kiriyath |
| 2000 | Snehaseema | DD Malayalam | - | Malayalam | |
| 1999 | Krishnathulasi | Asianet | Savithri teacher | Malayalam | |
| 1998-2001 | Ganga Yamuna Saraswati | Raj TV | - | Tamil | Dubbed in Telugu |
| 1998 | Sindooram | Asianet | - | Malayalam | Acted with Sithara |
| 1997-2000 | Manasi | DD Malayalam | Padmini's mother | Malayalam | First Mega Serial |
| 1996 | Niramaala | Asianet | - | Malayalam | |
| 1996 | Paatigal Jaakirathai | Sun TV | | Tamil | |
| 1995 | Janatha Nagar Colony | DD Podhigai | Andal | Tamil | |
| 1995 | Pennurimai | DD Malayalam | - | Malayalam | |
| 1993 | Manssariyum Yanthram | Asianet | - | Malayalam | Acted with Nedumudi Venu |
| 1993 | Michaelinte Santhathikal/ Serial co-starring Jose Prakash | DD Malayalam | - | Malayalam | |
| 1990 | Sa.ri.ga.ma.pa. | DD Malayalam | Radha | Malayalam | |
| 1989 - 1990 | Iravil Oru Pagal | DD Chennai | - | Tamil | |
| 1985 | Adayalam | DD Malayalam | - | Malayalam | Telefilm |
| | Pranaamam | | Nangeli Muthassi | Malayalam | Acted with Guinness Pakru |
| | Kalyanama Kalyanam | | | | |
| | Mayamma | | | Malayalam | |
| | Vandanam | | | Malayalam | |
| | Sandhyalekshmi | Amrita TV | | Malayalam | |
| | Sarkar Sahayam Driving School | DD Malayalam | Anglo Indian lady | Malayalam | Paired with Sahadevan master |
| | Kudumba Visheyshangal | | Dominant wife | Malayalam | Paired with Sahadevan master |
| | Uravugal Illaiyadi Pappa | DD | Vimala | Tamil | |
| | Sambhavami Yuge Yuge ! | | Mangalam | Tamil | |
| | Madras By Night | | Vanaja | Tamil | |
| | Muhammad bin Tughluq (Tughlak) | | Srimathi | Tamil | VCD/DVD/online versions |

== Stage plays (selection) ==
| Year | Title | Role | Language | Notes | Ref. |
|---|---|---|---|---|---|
| | Amateur drama - Kuwait group | | | | |
| | Bhama Vijayam | Rukmini | Tamil | | |
| | Bharathi Kanda Kanavu | | Tamil | | |
| | Dashavatharam | | Tamil | | |
| | Enru Thaniyum Inda Sudandira Thaagam? | | Tamil | | |
| | Gitopadesham | | Tamil | | |
| | Iraivan Irandhuvittana? | | Tamil | | |
| | Kalyanachitti | | Tamil | | |
| | Kannaki | Kovalan | Tamil | | |
| | Krishna | —N/a | Tamil | Voice only | |
| | Kuttavum Sikshayum | Lakshmikutty | Malayalam | | |
| | Madras By Night | Vanaja | Tamil | | |
| | Mind Is A Monkey | | Tamil | | |
| | Muhammad bin Tughluq | Srimathi | Tamil | | |
| | Nadagam | | Tamil | | |
| | Oh! What a Girl | | Tamil | | |
| | Padmavathisreenivasakalyanam | Srinivasa | Tamil | | |
| | Petaal Thaan Pillaya | | Tamil | | |
| | Poompuhar Kannagi | Kovalan | Tamil | | |
| | Quo Vadis | | Tamil | | |
| | Ramayanam | Hanuman | Tamil | | |
| | Sambhavami Yuge Yuge! | Mangalam | Tamil | | |
| | Saraswathiyin Sabatham | Saraswathi | Tamil | | |
| | Saraswathiyin Selvan | | Tamil | | |
| | Sri Krishna Parijatham | Radha | Tamil | | |
| | Srinivasa Kalyanam | Sreenivasa | Tamil | | |
| | Sri Venkateswara Mahatyam | | Tamil | | |
| | The Hidden Truth | | Tamil | | |
| | Valli | Murugan | Tamil | | |
| | Vazhj Thirumanam | | Tamil | | |
| | Venkidachalapathy Charithram | Venkata Jalapathi | Tamil | | |
| | Why Not? | | Tamil | | |

== Albums/Videos ==
| Year | Title | Role | Language | Notes | Ref. |
|---|---|---|---|---|---|
| 1988 | Mohan Lal with Suchitra | Herself | Malayalam | | |
| 1994 | Cinema Tharangalude Rasakaramaya Vimanayathra | Herself | Malayalam | East Coast Video - Interview type | from the stage entertainer Siddique-Lal Cine Galaxy |
| 1998 | Jayaramettananu Tharam | Herself | Malayalam | by Orbit Videovision | Mimicry by Jayaraman from the award show Johnson's Asianet Film Awards 1998 |
| 2006 | Ente Malayalam | Herself | Malayalam | Music video made for the 50th Anniversary of Kerala formation | |
| 2008 | Making of Twenty:20 | Herself | Malayalam | Video | |
| 2009 | Making Her Presence Felt, Sukumari ... | Herself | Malayalam | Interview based video by Webindia123 | |
| 2009 | The Location of Kana Kanmani | Herself | | | |
| 2010 | Working video of Four Friends | Herself | | | |
| 2011 | IFFK 2011 - Inaugural Ceremony (16th IFFK) | Herself | Malayalam | Opening ceremony video of 16th International Film Festival of Kerala | |
| 2012 | NIMS Heart to Heart Project | Herself | Malayalam | Awareness video | |
| 2012 | Attukal Inauguration | Herself | Malayalam | | |
| 2012 | Sukumari about Chattakkari | Herself | Malayalam | Promotional video by Peggy eggs.com | |
| 2012 | Black Butterfly Making Video Official | Herself | | | |
| 2012 | Diamond Necklace - Celebrating 126 Successful Days | Herself | Malayalam | | |
| 2012 | Sukumari On Tamil Cinema Through The Years | Herself | Tamil | Interview based video by Indiaglitz Malayalam Movies Interview | |
| 2012 | Rendezvous With Veteran Sukumari | Herself | Malayalam | Interview based video by Indiaglitz Presentation | |
| 2013 | Karpoora Priyan | Devotee | Malayalam | Devotional album | |
| 2013 | Ente Kanniyathra | Devotee | Malayalam | Devotional album | |
| 2013 | Thiruvathira Aghosham | Thiruvathira Dancer | Malayalam | Dance Video | |
| 2013 | Immanuel Movie Making | Herself | | Video by Asianet | |
| 2013 | Rebecca Uthup Kizhakemala - Making Video | Herself | | Video by Strikers & Crew | |
| 2013 | Paraman Pathanapuram | Herself | Malayalam | Video by East Coast | |
| 2013 | Veteran actress Sukumari @ Rajagiri | Herself | English | Short Video | |
| 2020 | Priyapetta Sukumari Marikkunathinu Mumpu | Herself | | Video | |

== Television - Non-fiction ==
| Year | Title | Role | Channel | Language | Notes | Ref. |
|---|---|---|---|---|---|---|
| 2003 | Interview | Herself | DD Malayalam | Malayalam | | |
| 2005 | Veettamma | Mentor | Kairali TV | Malayalam | | |
| 2005 - 2006 | Pesum Padam | Host | Amrita TV | Malayalam | | |
| 2006 | Samagamam | Herself | Amrita TV | Malayalam | | |
| 2006 | Madhurikkunna Ormakal | Herself | Surya TV | Malayalam | | |
| 2006 | Special Cookery Programme | Presenter | Asianet | Malayalam | | |
| 2006 | Tharathinoppam | Herself | Asianet News | Malayalam | | |
| 2006 | Amrita TV Onam 2006 | Herself | Amrita TV | Malayalam | | |
| 2006 | Annorikkal | Herself | Manorama News | Malayalam | | |
| 2007 | Minnum Tharam | Judge | Asianet | Malayalam | | |
| 2007 | Smile Plz | Judge | Asianet Plus | Malayalam | | |
| 2007 | Idea Star Singer | Judge | Asianet | Malayalam | | |
| 2008 | Idea Star Singer 3 | Judge | Asianet | Malayalam | | |
| 2008 | Nere Chovve | Herself | Manorama News | Malayalam | | |
| 2008 | Onam 2008 Jaihind TV Programme | Herself | Jaihind TV | Malayalam | | |
| 2008 | Thiranottam | Herself | ACV | Malayalam | | |
| 2008 | Onam Bonanza | Herself | Amrita TV | Malayalam | | |
| 2009 | Golden Talent | Herself | Jaihind TV | Malayalam | | |
| 2009 | Idea Star Singer 4 | Judge | Asianet | Malayalam | | |
| 2009 | Tharavishesham | Herself | Asianet | Malayalam | | |
| 2009 | Rani Maharani | Participant | Surya TV | Malayalam | | |
| 2010 | Sarigama | Participant | Asianet | Malayalam | | |
| 2010 | Ormayilennum | Herself | Surya TV | Malayalam | | |
| 2010 | Pachaka Rani | Judge | Kairali TV | Malayalam | | |
| 2011 | Idea Star Singer 6 | Judge | Asianet | Malayalam | | |
| 2011 | Tharavisesham - Sukumari | Herself | Asianet | Malayalam | | |
| 2011 | Cinema Karyangal | Herself | Amrita TV | Malayalam | | |
| 2011 | Apriyaganangal | Presenter | Asianet News | Malayalam | | |
| 2011 | On Record | Herself | Asianet News | Malayalam | | |
| 2011 | Entertainment News | Herself | Asianet News | Malayalam | | |
| 2011 | Katha Ithuvare | Herself | Mazhavil Manorama | Malayalam | | |
| 2011 | Veettamma Season 2 | Herself | Kairali TV | Malayalam | | |
| 2012 | Thirakkukalil Alpam Neram | Herself | Amrita TV | Malayalam | | |
| 2012 | Grihasakhi | Herself | Jeevan TV | Malayalam | | |
| 2012 | Autograph | Herself | Jaya TV | Tamil | | |
| 2012 | Jeevitham Ithuvare | Herself | Jaihind TV | Malayalam | | |
| 2012 | Amma Ammayiyamma (Audition) | Judge | Kairali TV | Malayalam | | |
| 2012 | Bhima Jewels Comedy Festival | Judge | Mazhavil Manorama | Malayalam | | |
| 2012 | Super Star | Judge | Amrita TV | Malayalam | | |
| 2012 | Sthree | Herself | ACV | Malayalam | | |
| 2012-2013 | Amma Ammayiyamma | Judge | Kairali TV | Malayalam | | |
| 2013 | Avar Kandumuttumbol | Herself | Mathrubhumi News | Malayalam | | |
| 2013 | Amchi Mumbai | Herself | Kairali TV | Malayalam | | |
| 2013 | Thrivenisangamasandhya (NTV)/ Face Dubai Mega Show | Herself | Jaihind TV | Malayalam | | |
| 2013 | Ormakalil Ente Amma | Herself | M7 News | Malayalam | | |
| | Vodafone Comedy Stars | Judge | Asianet | Malayalam | | |
| | Aavanitharam | | Kairali TV | Malayalam | | |
| | Melody | | Surya TV | Malayalam | | |
| | New Releases | Herself | Amrita TV | Malayalam | | |
| | Ammathan Onam Thiruvonam | | | Malayalam | | |
| | Sukumari Guest | Herself | Surya TV | Malayalam | | |
| | Abhinaya Mikavinte Soukumaryam | Herself | Surya TV | Malayalam | | |
| | Kannadi | | Asianet News | Malayalam | | |
| | News Hour | Herself | Asianet News | Malayalam | | |
| | Kudumbabandham Yesudas Ganangaliloode | Panelist | Asianet | Malayalam | | |
| | A Chat With Celebrity | Herself | Amrita TV | Malayalam | | |
| | Puthanpadam | Herself | Manorama News | Malayalam | | |
| | File | | Jaihind TV | Malayalam | | |
| | Marakka Mudiyuma | Herself | Murasu TV | Tamil | | |

== As presenter ==
- Radio show - AIR

== As award jury ==
- JC Daniel Award 2012

== TV/Online programmes ==
- Interview/Kairali Archive (Kairali TV)
- Symphony (Surya TV)
- Manorama News Programme
- Strikers & Crew
- Peggy eggs.com
- Webindia123.com - 2009
- Indiavision.com
- Indianterminal.com
- Kerala9.com
- Siffy.com
- Hot & Sour
- Stardust
- Mango Media
- Mixed

== Stage shows ==
- Aamchi Mumbai
- Alukkas Fairy Tale
- Alukkas Millennium Nite
- AMMA Stage show 2004
- Asianet Film Awards
- Asiavision TV Awards
- Cinestar Night, Australia
- Classical Dance Program at United Nations ECAFE Conference in Bangalore
- Dalimond Show
- Defense Programme
- Drishya Television Award Nite
- Face Dubai Mega Show
- Goodwin Jewellers Mega Event
- Grihalakshmi TV Awards
- Kairali Cultural Association Onam Fest
- Lux Asianet
- Madhavasandhya
- Malayalam Television Association Award Night
- Mathrubhumi Film Awards
- Minnale TV Awards
- Mohanlal Show 92
- MTVA TV Award Night 2000
- Onagosham 2012
- Onam Fest 2003, Kairal Cultural Association
- Priyapetta Mohanlal
- Siddique Lal's Cinegalaxy 94 Thalamurakalude Sangamam
- Sreekuttan
- Starry Nite 2003, Bangalore
- State Level Arts Festival
- Suryathejassode Amma
- Television and Audio Awards
- The Mammootty Stage Festival 96
- Vanitha Film Awards

== Cultural shows/Special programmes ==
- 100th Woman's Day Celebrations (KSWDC)
- Aazhchamela
- Aakshavani Radio Programmes
- AMMA Programmes
- Anachamayam
- Ancad Sankaranarayamoorthy Temple Programme
- ATMA Programmes
- Attukal Pongala
- Balagokulam's Janmashtami celebrations
- Chalakkudi Nagarasabha Christmas Virunnu
- Children's Film Fest
- Cho's Nadaka Mela
- Cinespot Programme
- Darppanam Malayalam Short Film Pooja
- Devan's Felicitation Function
- Eastman Studio Function
- FICCI Programme
- Friendship Club Onagosham
- Gamer (2014 Malayalam Movie)
- Garudanageyam
- Golden Jubilee Celebration of Kandam Becha Kottu
- Go Green, Save Nature
- Green Piece
- Grihalakshmi Interview
- Gurupooja
- Guruvayoor Satyagraha Remembrance
- Honour to Sivaji Ganesan by AMMA
- IFFK (16th)
- Indian Magic Academy - Fantasia Award Function
- Information and Guidance Society, Thiruvathira Celebrations Inauguration
- International Peace Film Festival
- Ividam Swargamannu Movie Press Conference
- Kadakkal Programme
- Kala Abudhabi
- Kalashreshta Award Function
- Kasargod Mahotsavam
- Keli Inauguration
- Kudumbashree Marketing Division Inauguration
- Lionthalon-2013
- Maarunna Malayali
- Mahamanjalprayude Bhadradeepa Prakashanam
- Makara Pongala
- Malayalapuzha Inauguration
- Mannali Pongala Inauguration
- Mathrubhumi Newspaper Programme
- Mathrubhumi SEED Programme
- Memory Lane Over Lunch
- Mohandas College of Engineering & Technology College Day Celebrations
- Mohanlal Fans Association First Year Celebrations
- Mullapperiyar Dam Discussion
- Muthassiyarkavu Pongala
- Nandalala Seva Samithi Trust Souvenir release
- Nayaru Pidicha Pulivalu Golden Jubilee
- NIMS Hospital (Heart to Heart Scheme)
- Onakodiyum Oonhalum
- "Padmarajan" Book Release Programme
- Pazhayakavu Kshethra Utsavam
- Platinum Jubilee of Malayalam cinema
- Pune Malayali Sangamam
- Radio Interviews
- Rajagiri PTA Day
- Roses The Family Club Anniversary
- Sakhi TV Office Programme
- Samanwayam
- Saraswathi Vidyalayam School Day Annual Event
- Shivagiri Theerthadana Mahamaham
- Sneha Trust Heart of Love
- Special Cookery Programme
- Srichithira Thirunnal Birthday Anniversary
- Sri Chithra Home Onam Celebrations
- Sri Eruthikkavu Pongala Mahotsavam
- The Hindu Newspaper Programme
- True Indian Function
- Veteran's Meet
- Ulnadu Temple Programme
- Wayanad Mahotsavam
- Webdunia Programme
- Weekly Round Up (interview)
- Women's Day Inauguration (Big Bazar, TVM)
- World Diabetes Day Celebrations Inauguration (Little Flower Hospital and Research Centre)

== Dubbed Releases ==
=== Bhojpuri ===
- Khilladi Ka Challenge
- Ponnar Shankar

=== Hindi ===
- Aaj Ka Kurukshetra
- Aakhri Sangram
- Aarayan Mera Naam
- Aayi Phirse Bahari
- Abhimanyu
- Aladdin and the Wonderful Lamp
- Amar Shaheed
- Basha: The Boss
- Baap Bete
- Ben Johnson
- ChakravartyVikramaditya
- Chandramukhi Devdas
- Commando
- Daisy
- Dangerous Khiladi 3
- Deivam
- Desh Ka Gaddar
- Dharma Yodha
- Dharmadhikari
- Diamond Necklace
- Dumdaar Commissioner
- Erra Samrajyam
- Friendship
- Girafthari
- Highway
- Hum Nahi Jhukenge
- Jaan Pe Khelkar
- Jaanbaaz Policewala
- Jaanwar Aur Insan
- Khaddama
- Khooni Insaan
- Lava Kusa
- Maaya Ka Saaya
- Man Ka Aangan
- Manzil Pyaar Ki
- Mayapuri 3D
- Mera Bheta
- Mizhikal Sakshi
- Mr. Badmash
- Neel Kamal
- Pathram
- Peoples Dada
- Phir Aaya Deewana
- Proprietors: Kammath & Kammath
- Prashanth Veer
- Ramayan
- Rough Tough
- Rowdy Cheetah
- Samba
- Satyaghath - Crime Never Pays
- Tiger Shiva
- Zahreele Saanp

=== Kannada ===
- Lava Kusa
- Yen Hudgiro Yaking Hadthiro
- Shakshi

=== Malayalam ===
- Alai Payuthey
- Chila Nerangalil Chila Manushyar
- Mounam Samadham
- Pammal K Sambandam
- Premabhishekham
- Randum Randum Anchu
- Suryaputhrikal
- Vasantha Malika
- Yaradi Nee Mohini

=== Marathi ===
- Mazaa Mulga

=== Odia ===
- Ben Johnson

=== Tamil ===
- Aranmanai Kadhali
- Anbulla Kamal
- Arasan
- Asoakan
- Avala Aaviya
- Ben Johnson
- Bhagawan
- Commissioner Eeswar Pandiyan
- Dakshayagnam
- Kuttram Thandanai
- Love Birds
- Madhuchandralekha
- Malleswaran
- Mangaikku Maangalyame Pradhaanam
- Maravathoor Kanavu
- Monalisa
- Mr. Deva
- Murari
- Nammvar
- Nata
- Nigazh Kaalam
- Paasa Mozhi
- Palaivana Roja
- Paraimedu
- Patti Vikramathithan
- Periya Gounder
- Progress Report
- Pudhiya Visarana
- Puliyattam
- Raam Bhaktha Hanuman
- Raghavan
- Samba
- Sambhavam
- Seetha Kalyanam
- Thalayana Manthram
- Thalaiyazuthu Meiyazuthu
- Thalaipu Seithigal
- Thiruttu Pasangal
- Ulagesh
- Vaira Malai
- Valthu Giren
- Vazhthukirean
- Vetrimaaran IPS
- Viratham
- Vizhigal Satchi

=== Telugu ===
- Aadharsha Saadharalu
- Abhiram
- Addala Meda
- Alavuthinum Arputha Deepam
- Ajatha Satruvu
- Ankuram
- Andhala Raja
- Anthuleni Prayanam
- Bhagyachakram
- Bhayankara Ratri
- Brahmachari
- CBI Officer
- Challenger
- Commissioner Rudrama Naidu
- Delhi Diary
- Devi Bhagavathi
- Doravari Satram
- English Ammayi
- Erra Rajyam
- Evidaine Sare
- Four Friends
- Guru Dakshana
- I Love You Teacher
- Intini Didina Illalu
- Journalist
- Kamakshi
- Lawyer The Great
- Love To Love
- Madhuchandralekha
- Manushulu Marali
- Monica
- Nayakudu
- New Delhi
- Nuvve Naa Srimathi
- Paatagadu
- Police Hecharika
- Pandava Samrajyam
- Panjaram
- Papa Kosam
- Peda Raja
- Prathignya
- Premaku Padhabhishekam
- Premalo Anjali Geetha Krishna
- Puli Veta
- Rajakota Rahasyam
- Rakshakudu
- Rangoon Raja
- Sahasaveerudu
- Sakhi
- Sampoorna Ramayanam
- Sundarangudu
- Swami Ayyappa
- Taxi Driver
- Tiger Rajani
- Veedagni
- Veerapandiya Kattabrahmanna
- Yoddha

== Related shows ==
- Smrithi (Safari TV)
- Padamudrakal (ACV)
- Democrazy (Reporter TV)
- Thalolam (Amrita TV)
- Idivettu Thamasha (Surya Comedy)
- Cinema Kottaka (Kaumudy TV)
- Indraya Naalil (Capital TV)
- Puthiya Geethangal (Asianet)
- Filmy Fridays (YouTube)
