= Poocha Sanyasi =

- Directed by: Hariharan
- Written by: Hariharan; Dr. Balakrishnan (dialogues)
- Screenplay by: Hariharan
- Starring: Sukumari; Rajkumar; Bahadoor; Balan K. Nair
- Cinematography: Melli Irani
- Edited by: M. S. Mani
- Music by: K. J. Yesudas
- Production company: Hymavathy Movie Makers
- Distributed by: Hymavathy Movie Makers
- Release date: 30 October 1981
- Country: India
- Language: Malayalam

Poocha Sanyasi is a 1981 Indian Malayalam-language film, directed by Hariharan. The film stars Sukumari, Rajkumar, Bahadoor and Balan K. Nair. The film's score was composed by K. J. Yesudas.

== Cast ==
- Sukumari
- Rajkumar
- Bahadoor
- Balan K. Nair
- Jayamalini
- Kuthiravattam Pappu
- Madhavi
- Oduvil Unnikrishnan
- P. K. Venukkuttan Nair
- Priya
- Ragini
- Reena
- Ummer
- Pappu

== Soundtrack ==
The music was composed by K. J. Yesudas with lyrics by Poovachal Khader and Mankombu Gopalakrishnan.

| No. | Song | Singers | Lyrics | Length (m:ss) |
|---|---|---|---|---|
| 1 | "Engine Engine Njaan" | S. P. Sailaja | Poovachal Khader | |
| 2 | "Ivanoru Sanyaasi" | Sujatha Mohan, Vani Jairam, Ambili, S. P. Sailaja | Mankombu Gopalakrishnan | |
| 3 | "Naarikal" | K. J. Yesudas | Mankombu Gopalakrishnan | |
| 4 | "Njan Penkodimaarude" | K. J. Yesudas | Mankombu Gopalakrishnan | |
| 5 | "Oro Vaakkilum" (Neelaaranyam Malarukal) | K. J. Yesudas, S. P. Sailaja | Poovachal Khader | |
