= Mafia Sasi =

Indian stuntman

- Born: Sasidharan; Kannur, Kerala, India
- Occupations: actor, Stuntman
- Years active: 1981–present
- Spouse: Sreedevi
- Children: Sandeep, Sandhya
- Parent(s): Balan, Saraswathi

Mafia Sasi, aka Sasidharan, is an Indian athlete and stuntman mainly in Malayalam movies. He has performed stunts in all South Indian languages for more than 1000 films. He performed stunts in the movie Mafia, which became a super hit, and he subsequently adopted the name Mafia Sasi. He has acted in a few movies as well. In 2022, he bagged National Award for best stunt choreography along with Supreme Sundar and Rajasekhar for Ayyappanum Koshiyum in the 68th National Film Awards.

== Background ==
He was born as Sasidharan Puthiyaveettil, to Balan and Saraswathi at Chirakkal, Kannur. He received his education from Chirakkal Raja's School, Kannur and Madras Christian College. He is married to Sreedevi. The couple has a son, Sandeep Sasi, and a daughter, Sandhya. Sandeep is making his acting debut through a Malayalam movie, Gunda.

== Filmography ==
=== As a stunt master ===
- 2024 Sureshanteyum Sumalathayudeyum Hrudayahariyaya Pranayakadha
- 2023 Mark Antony (2023 film)
- 2023 Thuramukham (2023 film) (stunt Director)
- 2014 Gunda (stunt Director)
- 2013 Pattam Pole (stunt coordinator)
- 2013 Daivathinte Swantham Cleetus (stunt coordinator)
- 2012 Jawan of Vellimala (stunts)
- 2011 Three Kings (stunts)
- 2011 Doubles (stunts)
- 2010 Pokkiri Raja (stunts)
- 2010 Pramani (stunts)
- 2010 Dhrona 2010 (stunts)
- 2009 Ee Pattanathil Bhootham (stunts)
- 2009 Aayirathil Oruvan (stunts)
- 2009 Vellathooval (stunts)
- 2008 Thalappavu (action)
- 2008 Aayudham (stunts)
- 2008 Sound of Boot (fights)
- 2007 Kangaroo (stunts)
- 2007 Chocolate (stunts)
- 2007 Nadiya Kollappetta Rathri (stunts)
- 2007 The Speed Track (stunts)
- 2007 Inspector Garud (stunts)
- 2006 Classmates (stunts)
- 2006 Pathaka (stunts)
- 2006 Tanthra (stunt coordinator)
- 2006 Chess (stunts)
- 2006 Kilukkam Kilukilukkam (stunts)
- 2005 The Tiger (stunts)
- 2005 Nerariyan CBI (stunts)
- 2005 Pauran (stunts)
- 2005 Thaskara Veeran (stunts)
- 2005 Krithyam (stunts)
- 2005 Kochi Rajavu (stunts)
- 2005 Immini Nalloraal (stunts)
- 2005 Iruvattam Manavatti (stunts)
- 2005 Five Fingers (stunts)
- 2005 Junior Senior (stunts)
- 2005 Ponmudipuzhayorathu (stunts)
- 2005 Twinkle Twinkle Little Star (stunts)
- 2004 Kottaram Vaidyan (stunts)
- 2004 Kusruthi (stunts)
- 2004 Maratha Nadu (stunts)
- 2004 Amrutham (stunts)
- 2004 Black (stunts)
- 2004 Vajram (stunts)
- 2003 Thillana Thillana (stunts)
- 2003 Vasanthamallika (stunts)
- 2003 Chakram (stunts)
- 2003 Valathottu Thirinjal Nalamathe Veedu (stunts)
- 2003 War & Love (stunts)
- 2003 C.I.D. Moosa (stunts)
- 2002 Kannaki (stunts)
- 2002 Mazhathullikkilukkam (stunts)
- 2002 Videsi Nair Swadesi Nair (stunts)
- 2002 Meesha Madhavan (stunts)
- 2001 Achaneyanenikkishtam (stunts)
- 2001 Bharthavudyogam (stunts)
- 1999 Aayiram Meni (stunts)
- 1999 Crime File (stunts)
- 1999 Panchapandavar (stunt director)
- 1999 Pranaya Nilavu (stunts)
- 1999 Udayapuram Sulthan (stunts)
- 1998 Elavamkodu Desam (stunts)
- 1998 Mayajalam (stunts)
- 1998 Oro Viliyum Kathorthu (stunts)
- 1997 Ekkareyanente Manasam (stunts)
- 1997 Kottapurathe Koottukudumbam (stunts)
- 1997 Manasam (stunts)
- 1997 Nagarapuranam (stunts)
- 1997 Newspaper Boy (stunts)
- 1997 Oral Mathram (stunts)
- 1996 Kalyana Sowgandhikam (stunts)
- 1996 Man of the Match (stunts)
- 1996 Patanayakan (stunts)
- 1996 Sallapam (stunts)
- 1996 Swapna Lokathe Balabhaskaran (stunts)
- 1995 Aadyathe Kanmani (stunts)
- 1995 Avittam Thirunaal Aarogya Sriman (stunts)
- 1995 Kaatttile Thadi Thevarude Ana (stunts)
- 1995 Kalamasseriyil Kalyanayogam (stunts)
- 1995 Kidilol Kidilam (stunts)
- 1995 Mangalam Veettil Manaseswari Gupta (stunts)
- 1995 Manikya Chempazhukka (stunts)
- 1995 Mannar Mathai Speaking (stunts)
- 1995 Pai Brothers (stunts)
- 1995 Puthukkottayile Puthumanavalan (stunts)
- 1995 Sadaram (stunts)
- 1995 Thirumanassu (stunts)
- 1995 Tom & Jerry (stunts)
- 1994 Vadhu Doctoranu (stunts)
- 1993 Aayirappara (stunts - as Sasi)

== As an actor ==
- 2024 Bad Boyz
- 2021 Vellam
- 2020 Shylock as himself
- 2020 Driving License as himself
- 2017 Masterpiece as himself
- 2015 Ringmaster as stunt master
- 2012 Chirakodinja Kinavukal as Sasi annan
- 2012 Mayamohini (Guest appearance in Mayamohini song)
- 2011 Teja Bhai & Family as Ammittu
- 2010 Best Actor as himself
- 2010 Swantham Bharya Zindabad (Himself)
- 2007 Kichamani M.B.A.
- 2006 Narakasuran
- 2005 Hai
- 2004 Chathikatha Chandu
- 2003 Shingari Bolona
- 2003 War & Love
- 2002 Snehadooth as Pazhani
- 2001 Bhadra
- 2000 Ival Draupadi
- 2000 Rapid Action Force (2000) as Thakur
- 2000 Aanamuttate Aangalmar (2000) as Govindankutty
- 1999 Ustaad (1999) as Sulaiman
- 1999 Panchapaandavar as Masthan
- 1997 Kalyana Kacheri
- 1996 Pallivaathukkal Thommichan ...Hamsa
- 1996 Harbour as Raghavan
- 1996 Kanchanam as Minister's driver
- 1996 Padanayakan
- 1996 Naalamketile Nalla Thampimar
- 1995 Special Squad
- 1995 Mimics Action 500 as Gunda
- 1995 Minaminuginnu Minnukettu
- 1993 Koushalam as Victor Solomon
- 1992 Maayanmar
- 1991 Mookkillaaraajyathu as
- 1991 Kadhanayika as Gunda
- 1990 Mridula as Gunda
- 1990 His Highness Abdullah
- 1987 Kanikanum Neram
- 1986 Ente Shabdam
- 1985 Chorakku Chora as Gunda
- 1984 Nishedi as Gunda
- 1984 Unaroo as Goonda
- 1983 Varanmaare Aavashyamundu as Gunda
- 1983 Prathigna as Gunda
- 1982 Panchajanyam as Gunda
- 1982 Anuraagakkodathi as Gunda
- 1981 Ranuva Veeran (Tamil)
