= Rajkumar Sethupathi =

Indian actor

Rajkumar Sethupathy
- Born: 7 October 1956 (age 69); Chennai
- Years active: 1980–1988 (actor); 2013–2015 (producer)
- Spouse: Sripriya (m. 1988)
- Children: 2
- Father: Shanmugha Rajeswara Sethupathy

Rajkumar Sethupathy is an Indian actor who acts predominantly in Malayalam and Tamil films. He has acted in 50 movies in both Malayalam and Tamil films. He started his film career in the Tamil film Soolam, directed by M. Bhaskar, then with Mammootty in Thrishna, a 1981 Malayalam film. He acted in many films during the 1980s.

== Early life ==
Rajkumar was born in Chennai in a Royal family. He is the son of producer Shanmugha Rajeswara Sethupathi and Leelarani. Leelarani and his grandmother are from Kurnool. Tamil actress Latha is his elder sister. He has completed 2 years of acting courses at South India Film Chambers.

== Personal life ==
He is the younger brother of actress Latha Sethupathi. He married Tamil actress Sripriya in 1988.

== Filmography ==
=== Acting credits ===
==== Malayalam ====
- Thrishna (1981)
- Poochasanyaasi (1981)
- Parvathy (1981) as Mahendra Varma
- Aranjaanam (1982) as Rajesh
- Aasha (1982) as Lal
- Akrosham (1982)
- Kazhumaram (1982)
- Pooviriyum Pulari (1982) as Johny
- Innalenkil Nale (1982)
- Enikkum Oru Divasam (1982) as Hamsa
- Odukkam Thudakkam (1982)
- Anuraagakkodathi (1982) as Ravi
- Varanmaare Aavashyamundu (1983)
- Rathilayam (1983)
- Asthi (1983) as Krishnamoorthy
- Bhookambam (1983)
- Parasparam (1983) as Issac
- Kattaruvi (1983)
- Hello Madras Girl (1983)
- Onnu Chirikkoo (1983) as Raju
- Mahabali (1983)
- Thalaam Thettiya Thaarattu (1983)
- Unni Vanna Divasam (1984)
- Krishna Guruvaayoorappa (1984)
- Thathamme Poocha Poocha (1984)
- Vepraalam (1984)
- Vikatakavi (1984)
- Jeevitham (1984) as Chandran
- Karimbu (1984)
- Poomadhathe Pennu (1984) as Anand
- Karinagam (1985)
- Ithramathram (1986) as Ravi
- Bheekaran (1988)
- Athirthikal (1988)

==== Tamil ====
- Soolam (1980)
- Kashmir Kadhali (1983)
- Unmaigal (1983)
- Villiyanur Matha (1983)
- Anbulla Rajinikanth (1984)
- Chain Jayapal (1985)
- Aayiram Pookkal Malarattum (1986)
- Kadhal Parisu (1987)

==== Telugu ====
- Andala Rasi (1980)
- Jagamondi (1981)
- Manasa Veena (1984)

=== As producer ===
- Malini 22 Palayamkottai (2013)
- Drushyam (2014)
- Papanasam (2015)
- Drushyam 2 (2021)
