= Varanmaare Aavashyamundu =

1983 Indian film

- Directed by: Hariharan
- Produced by: Joy
- Starring: Rajkumar; Swapna; Vincent; Sukumari
- Cinematography: U.Rajagopal
- Music by: K. J. Joy
- Release date: 9 July 1983
- Country: India
- Language: Malayalam

Varanmaare Aavashyamundu (transl. Grooms wanted) is a 1983 Indian Malayalam-language film, directed by Hariharan and produced by Joy. The film stars Rajkumar, Swapna, Vincent and Sukumari in the lead roles. The film has musical score by K. J. Joy. It was commercially successful.

== Cast ==
- Rajkumar as Rajkumar
- Swapna as Pappi
- Vincent as Mohan
- Sukumari as Kalyani
- Pattom Sadan as Sadashivan Nair
- V. D. Rajappan as Rajappan
- Bahadoor as Dubai Keshavan
- Balan K. Nair as Abdullakka
- Kuthiravattam Pappu as Omanakuttan
- Oduvil Unnikrishnan as Karanavar
- Paravoor Bharathan
- Ravi Menon as Ravikumar
- Ahalya
- Lalithasree as Houseowner
- Mafia Sasi as Gunda
- Kundara Johnny as Gunda
- Benny as Chinnan
- Ragini as Kittu
- Aravindan as Aravindan

== Soundtrack ==
The music was composed by K. J. Joy and the lyrics were written by P. Bhaskaran.

No.	Song	Singers	Length (m:ss)
1	"Anuraaga Daaham Nayanangalil"	K. J. Yesudas	
2	"Maina Hu Menake"	K. J. Yesudas	
3	"Menaka Njaan Menaka"	Vani Jairam	
4	"Pandu Ninne"	K. J. Yesudas	
