= Anuraagakkodathi =

- Directed by: Hariharan
- Written by: Dr. Balakrishnan
- Screenplay by: Dr. Balakrishnan
- Produced by: Areefa Hassan
- Starring: Shankar; Rajkumar; Ambika; Madhavi
- Cinematography: J. Williams
- Edited by: V. P. Krishnan
- Music by: A. T. Ummer
- Production company: Arifa Enterprises
- Distributed by: Arifa Enterprises
- Release date: 24 December 1982
- Country: India
- Language: Malayalam

Anuraagakkodathi is a 1982 Indian Malayalam film, directed by Hariharan and produced by Areefa Hassan. The film stars Shankar, Rajkumar, Ambika and Madhavi in the lead roles. The film has musical score by A. T. Ummer.

== Cast ==
- Shankar as Shivadasan
- Rajkumar as Ravi
- Ambika as Susheela
- Madhavi as Anuradha
- Sukumari as Meenakshi
- Prathapachandran as Minister Chandrasekharan
- Bahadoor as Muthangakuzhi Gopalan
- C. I. Paul as Shivaraman
- Jagathy N. K. Achary as Professor
- Kuthiravattam Pappu as Gopi
- Lalithasree
- Oduvil Unnikrishnan as Pachu Nair
- Paravoor Bharathan as Kunjunni
- Ranipadmini as Mini
- Raveendran as Rajan
- Sathyachitra as Gomathi
- Mafia Sasi

== Soundtrack ==
The music was composed by A. T. Ummer and the lyrics were written by Mankombu Gopalakrishnan and Sathyan Anthikkad.

| No. | Song | Singers | Lyrics | Length (m:ss) |
|---|---|---|---|---|
| 1 | "Harasankara Sivasankara" | P. Susheela, Vani Jairam | Mankombu Gopalakrishnan | |
| 2 | "Mazhavillaal Panthal Meyunnu" | K. J. Yesudas | Mankombu Gopalakrishnan | |
| 3 | "Ramu Raju" | K. J. Yesudas | Sathyan Anthikkad | |
| 4 | "Thennithenni" | S. Janaki | Sathyan Anthikkad | |

== view the film ==
- Anuraga Kodathi Malayalam film
