= Unni Vanna Divasam =

- Directed by: Rajan Balakrishnan
- Written by: Dr. Balakrishnan
- Produced by: K. G. Mohan
- Starring: Sukumari; Sankaradi; Captain Raju; Rajkumar
- Cinematography: Anandakuttan
- Edited by: Rajasekharan
- Music by: A. T. Ummer
- Production company: KGM Pictures
- Distributed by: KGM Pictures
- Release date: 29 June 1984
- Country: India
- Language: Malayalam

Unni Vanna Divasam is a 1984 Indian Malayalam film, directed by Rajan Balakrishnan and produced by K. G. Mohan. The film stars Sukumari, Sankaradi, Captain Raju and Rajkumar in the lead roles. The film has musical score by A. T. Ummer. The film was dubbed in Tamil as Love Birds.

== Cast ==
- Sukumari as Sharada
- Sankaradi as Kurup
- Captain Raju as Ashok
- Rajkumar as Unni
- Suhasini as Anu
- Charuhasan as Nair

== Soundtrack ==
The music was composed by A. T. Ummer and the lyrics were written by Devadas.

No.	Song	Singers	Lyrics	Length (m:ss)
1	"Chithram Oru Chithram"	K. J. Yesudas, S. Janaki	Devadas	
2	"Varnnamaala"	S. Janaki	Devadas	
