= Pooviriyum Pulari =

- Promotional Poster
- Directed by: G.Prem Kumar
- Written by: G Premkumar; Pappanamkodu Lakshmanan
- Screenplay by: Pappanamkodu Lakshmanan
- Produced by: G Premkumar; TS Roy; Prasad Chandran for Cherry Enterprises
- Starring: Shankar; Rajalakshmi; Mammootty; Ambika; Rajkumar Sethupathi; Sukumari; Captain Raju; Kuthiravattam Pappu; Mala Aravindan; Prathapachandran; Sreenath
- Cinematography: J. Williams
- Edited by: R. Santharam
- Music by: Jerry Amaldev (music); Poovachal Khader (lyrics)
- Production company: Cherry Enterprises
- Distributed by: Cherry Enterprises
- Release date: 11 May 1982
- Running time: 130 min.
- Country: India
- Language: Malayalam

Pooviriyum Pulari is a 1982 Indian Malayalam-language feature film, produced by G Premkumar, TS Roy and Prasad Chandran and directed by G Premkumar, starring Shankar, Rajalakshmi and Rajkumar Sethupathi. The film has a musical score by Jerry Amaldev. Mammootty appeared in antagonist role. The film is an emotional family drama.

== Cast ==
- Shankar as Balan
- Rajalakshmi as Nandini
- Mammootty as Ramesh
- Ambika as Renuka
- Rajkumar Sethupathi as John
- Sukumari as Madhavi
- Captain Raju as Reghu's Father
- Kuthiravattam Pappu as Nandini's Brother
- Mala Aravindan
- Prathapachandran as Balan's Father
- Sreenath as Reghu
- Nellikode Bhaskaran as Mammadh

== Soundtrack ==
The music was composed by Jerry Amaldev with lyrics by Poovachal Khader.

No.	Song	Singers	Lyrics	Length (m:ss)
1	"Iniyumethu Theeram"	P. Jayachandran	Poovachal Khader	
2	"Kandu Ninne Sundarippenne"	P. Jayachandran, Vani Jairam	Poovachal Khader	
3	"Manathaaril Mevun" (Mullappanthal bit)	Vani Jairam	Poovachal Khader	
4	"Mullappanthal Pooppanthal"	Vani Jairam	Poovachal Khader	
5	"Premathin Maniveenayil"	P. Jayachandran, Vani Jairam	Poovachal Khader	
