= Sukumari =

Indian film actress

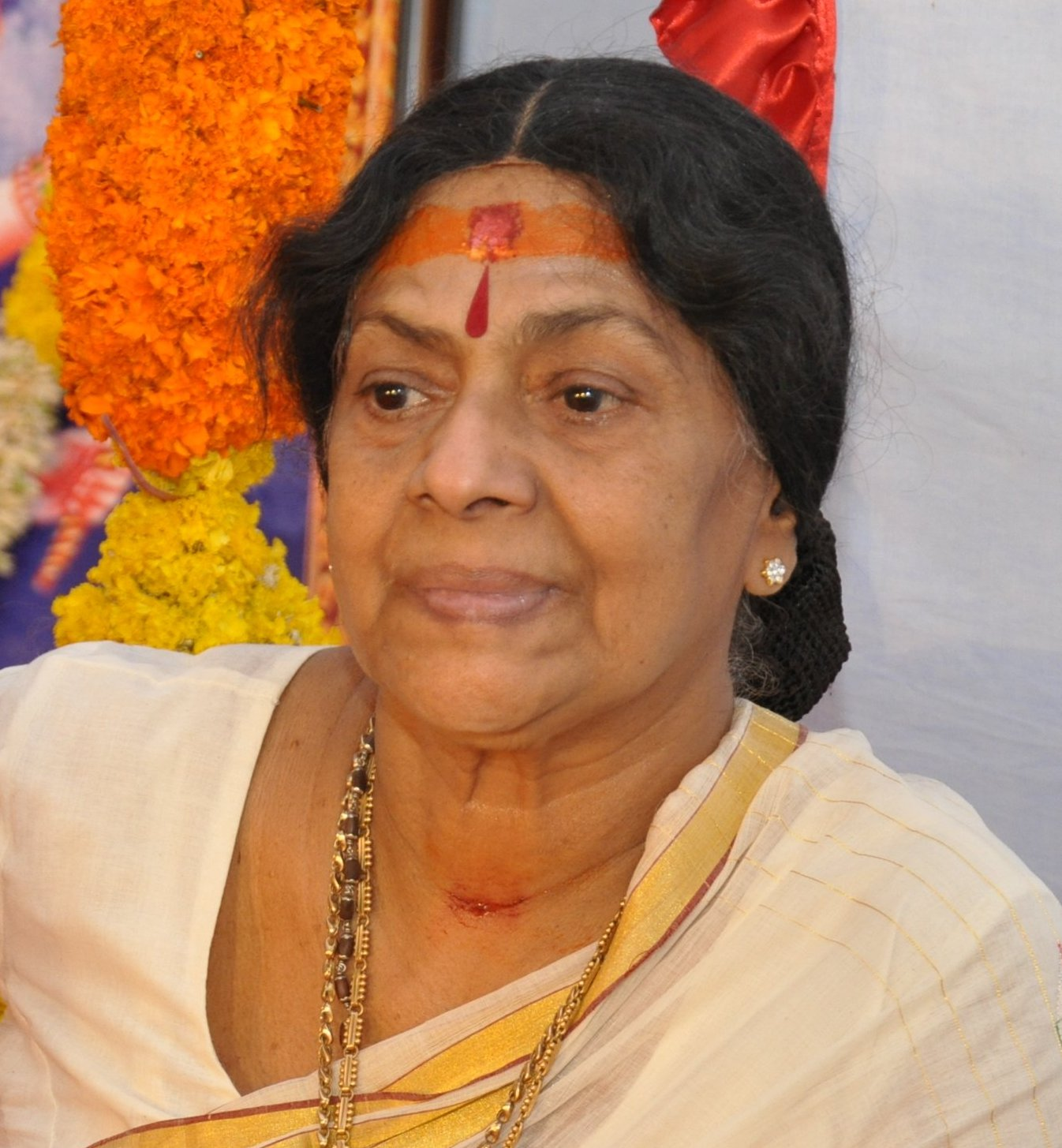
- Born: 6 October 1940; Nagercoil, Travancore, British India (present-day Tamil Nadu, India)
- Died: 26 March 2013 (aged 72); Chennai, Tamil Nadu, India
- Occupations: Actress; classical dancer; voice artist
- Years active: 1946–2013
- Works: Partial list
- Spouse: A. Bhimsingh (m. 1959; died 1978)
- Children: 1
- Relatives: Travancore family
- Awards: See below

Sukumari (6 October 1940 – 26 March 2013) was an Indian actress best known for her works in Malayalam and Tamil films. In a career spanning more than five decades, she appeared in more than 2,500 films predominantly in Malayalam, Tamil, Telugu, along with a few Hindi and one each in Sinhala, French, Italian, Bengali, Tulu, English and Kannada films. Sukumari began acting at the age of 10. In 2003, she was awarded the Padma Shri by the Government of India for her contributions toward the arts. She won the National Film Award for Best Supporting Actress for her role in the Tamil film Namma Gramam (2010). Sukumari died on 26 March 2013 in Chennai, following a heart attack.

== Early life ==
Sukumari was born on 6 October 1940 in Nagercoil, Travancore (currently in Tamil Nadu), to Malayali parents Madhavan Nair (a bank manager) and Sathyabhama Amma of Tharishuthala Valia Veedu in Kalkulam (in present-day Kanyakumari District). Sathyabhama Amma was the niece of Narayani Pillai Kunjamma, a famous beauty who spurned the king in favour of marrying the aristocratic landowner Kesava Pillai of Kandamath. Through her cousin, Ambika Sukumaran, she was related to the Travancore royal family.

She studied at Poojappura LP School until second grade, she then moved to Madras, where she studied until fourth forum. She had four sisters (Rajakumari, Sreekumari, Jayasree and Girija) and one brother, Shankar. Lalitha, Padmini and Ragini (Travancore Sisters) were her cousins.

== Career ==
Sukumari was noticed by a director when she visited the sets of a film with Padmini, and she made her film debut in the lead role in the Tamil film Ore Iravu. She acted in various Malayalam and Tamil films of the black and white era, such as Udhyogastha, by P. Venu, Chettathi, Kusruthikkuttan, Kunjali Marakkar, Thacholi Othenan, Yakshi and Karinizhal. She later became popular after starring in various films of Priyadarshan such as Poochakkoru Mookkuthi, Odaruthammava Aalariyam, Boeing Boeing and Vandanam. She also appeared in various films directed by Balachandra Menon such as Manicheppu Thurannappol and Karyam Nissaram. In later years, she played a major role in Nizhalkuthu (2002), directed by Adoor Gopalakrishnan. She played many notable mother roles most notably with Mammootty.

She mastered dance forms like Kathakali, Bharathanatyam, Kerala Natanam and many musical instruments. From the age of seven, she performed all over India and different parts of the world including USA, Singapore, Malaysia, Ceylon, and Australia. Sukumari is also known for her stage career in her early days, most prominently as a member of Cho Ramaswamy's theatre group; Viveka Fine Arts (more than 5000 stage shows). She was a member of Y. G. Parthasarathy's and Pattu's drama troupe; United Amateur Artists (more than 1000 stage shows), Rajasulochana's dance troupe; Pushpanjali (more than 5000 stage shows), Travancore Sisters' Dancers of India troupe (many stage shows), T. D. Kusalakumari's troupe; (more than 1000 stage shows) and Padmini's independent dance drama troupe;Premanand Pictures (many stage shows) etc. for many decades. Awards in the name of Sukumari have been instituted for the memory like "Vanita Ratnam Award" : in the field of acting. "Mikacha Nadi Sukumari Puraskaram" by ACTA annakkara, "Sukumari Smaraka Foundation Award" by True Indian Information and Guidance Society and "Famea Sukumari Puraskaram".

Her memoirs in the film industry have been compiled in a book called "Ormakalude Vellithira" by M.S Dileep. "Sukumari Sradhanjali Parambara" is another book on her.

== Personal life ==
Sukumari married director A. Bhimsingh in 1959. He died in 1978, when she was 38. The couple had a son, Suresh, who has acted in films such as Amme Narayana, Yuvajanotsavam and Cheppu, and is a professional doctor. Suresh married Uma, a costume designer. Suresh and Uma have a son named Vignesh.

== Death ==
On 26 March 2013, Sukumari died from a cardiac arrest at a hospital in Chennai, where she was receiving treatments for burns she had sustained while lighting a traditional lamp at her residence in February 2013.

Following her death, several South Indian personalities offered their condolences. Tamil Nadu Chief Minister Jayalalithaa, who had co-starred with Sukumari, said in a condolence message that Sukumari had left a unique imprint on South Indian cinema and theatre with her talents. Kerala's Chief Minister, Oommen Chandy called Sukumari a "phenomenon in Malayalam cinema". Actor and Minister for Cinema K. B. Ganesh Kumar said actors in the Malayalam film industry had lost "the loving presence of a mother in the sets". Leader of the Opposition V. S. Achuthanandan called Sukumari's death a "huge loss for Indian cinema". Kerala Pradesh Congress Committee president Ramesh Chennithala said Sukumari would be remembered for "the diversity of characters that she gave life to". Communist Party of India State Secretary Pannian Ravindran said Sukumari was "an unforgettable acting genius". Union Minister of State for Food and Consumer Affairs K. V. Thomas described Sukumari as an actor who conquered the film scene with her unique acting style. South Indian Film Artistes Association president R. Sarathkumar remembered the actress as being an inspiration to others. Actor and renowned television producer Radhika recalled Sukumari's many dance performances. Actor and president of Association of Malayalam Movie Artists Innocent said at a condolence meeting at Kochi that her death was an irreparable loss to Malayalam film industry. Malayalam movie star Mammootty had expressed his grief at her death. South Indian film star Mohanlal likened her death to the loss of "a mother, sister and a good friend". Speaker G. Karthikeyan also expressed grief at her death. Director Shaji Kailas deemed her loss an "irreparable one for the film industry".

== Awards and honours ==
Year	Award	Category	Film
2003	Civilian awards	Padma Shri	
2011	National Film Awards	Best Supporting Actress	Namma Gramam
1974	Kerala State Film Awards	Second Best Actress	Chattakkari
1979	Kerala State Film Awards	Second Best Actress	Various films
1983	Kerala State Film Awards	Second Best Actress	Koodevide, Karyam Nissaram
1986	Kerala State Film Awards	Second Best Actress	Arappatta Kettiya Gramathil
1990	Tamil Nadu State Film Awards	Kalai Selvam Award	
1991	Tamil Nadu State Film Awards	Kalaimamani Award	
2000	Tamil Nadu State Film Awards	Sivaji Ganesan Award	
2005	Filmfare Awards	Filmfare Lifetime Achievement Award	
1998	Asianet Film Awards	Best Supporting Actress	Samaantharangal
2005	Asianet Film Awards	Lifetime Achievement Award	
2006	Asianet Film Awards	Best Supporting Actress	
1979	Kerala Film Critics Award	Best Supporting Actress	Ezhunirangal
1982	Kerala Film Critics Award	Best Supporting Actress	Chiriyo Chiri
1985	Kerala Film Critics Award	Best Supporting Actress	Arappatta Kettiya Gramathil
2000	Kerala Film Critics Association Awards	Chalachitra Ratnam Award	
2000	Kerala Film Critics Award	Special Award for Contribution to the Film Industry	
2011	Kerala Film Critics Award	Chalachitra Pratibha	
1967	Kerala Film Critics Association Awards	Best Supporting Actress	Various films
1974	Kerala Film Critics Association Awards	Special Award	Chattakkari
1980	Kerala Film Critics Association Awards	Best Character Actress	
1981	Kerala Film Critics Association Awards	Best Character Actress	
1971	Films Fans Association Awards – Madras	Best Supporting Actress	Thoraimugam
1974	Films Fans Association Awards – Madras	Best Supporting Actress	Chattakkari
1997	Prachodanam Award		
2000	Gulf Malayalee Cine Awards	All-rounder of the Millennium	
2000	KSFDC	Special Facilitation at Jubilee	
2000	Lux Asianet Award	Special Honour	
2001	Kala Kairali Awards	Special Award	
2001	Dubai Kairali Kala Kendra Association Award	Lifetime Achievement Award	
2002	Bharath Cine Awards	Tamil Thirai Ulaga Sagapthangal	
2003	Parvathypadmam Puraskaram	Lifetime Achievement Award	
2004	Kerala Woman Beauticians Association: TV Serial Award	Best Character Artist	Avicharitham
2005	Sangam Kala Group	Lifetime Achievement Award	
2005	Federation of Kerala Associations in North America (FOKANA)	Contribution to Malayalam films.	
2007	SICA Award	Lifetime Achievement Award	
2007	P.S. John Endowment Award		
2007	Malayala Chalachithra Parishad	Lifetime Achievement Award	
2007	Ernakulam Press Club Award	Lifetime Achievement Award	
2007	Kala Abu Dhabi Award	Kala Ratnam Award	
2007	Prem Nazir Award		
	Sathyan Award (Kerala Cultural Forum)		
2008	Mathrubhumi Amrita Film Awards	Amrita Chalachitra Saparya Puraskaram	
2008	Nippon Paints Award	Lifetime Achievement Award	
2009	Telefest Award	Best Actress	Mizhikal Sakshi
2009	Atlas Critic Award		
2009	Asia Television U.A.E		
2009	World Malayalee Council India region & Kairali Channel Award	Best Supporting Actress	Mizhikal Sakshi
2010	Gurupranamam, Honour by MACTA	Lifetime Achievement	
2010	Thrissur Jilla Souhruida Award		
2011	Bahadoor Award		
	Trivandrum Film Fraternity		
2011	Act Puraskaram		
2012	Asiavision TV Awards		
	Sangeetha, UK Award	Abhinava Puraskaram	
	Trichur Nagar Sabha Award	Jangiya Award	
	Prashasthi Pathram	Acting with two generation actors in different languages	
	Kala Kairali, Chennai Award	Abhinaya Bharathi	
2001	Honour by TVS Victor "Ammayodoppam"		
2002	Soorya Stage & Film Society Honour	Felicitation for Outstanding Contribution to Indian Cinema	
2002	Gurupooja, Soorya Festival Special Honour	Lifetime Achievement	
	Honour by Kaniyapuram Rail View Residence Association		
	Pravasa Bharathi Karma Ratna Award		
2000	Narasimham 175 Days Celebration (Special Honour)		
2003	Ammayodoppam		
2003	Honour by Delhi Tamil Sangam		
2005	Honour by Jacey Foundation		
2005	Honour by Amrita TV Film Fraternity Awards		
2006	Honour by Samskara Samithi		
2006	Honour by Sree Poonthuruthi Muchilott Bhagavathi Temple		
2007	Honour by Sangamam show on Amrita TV		
2012	Honour by Federation of Indian Chambers of Commerce & Industry		
2012	ICCI Honour		
2013	Honour by Sundara Sowhrudam		
2013	Honour by Friends of Arts& Cultural Entertainments (FACE Dubai) – "Thriveni Sangamam"		
2013	Indiavision Live Poll – Favourite Actress (100 Years of Indian Cinema)	Second position	

== Advertisements ==
Sukumari appeared in various print features, audio-visual endorsements, online promotions, commercial public campaigns etc.

- Amma Ammayiyamma
- Aparna Natural Foods
- Assal
- Chalachithram Magazine
- Chithrabhumi
- Chungath Jewellery
- Goodwin Jewellers
- Grand Kerala Shopping Festival
- Grihalakshmi Magazine
- Happy Home Grihasri Kuris Pvt Ltd
- Indumukhi Chandramathi (Season 1)
- Jewellery ad co-starring Reenu Mathews
- Joy Alukkas Jewellery
- Jingles
- Kalakaumudi
- Kanikka Audio CD
- Kapil Ganesh Photography
- Keralakaumudi
- Kerala Food Festival
- Kerala Kitchen Restaurant
- Krishna Thulasi Hair Tonic
- Madhyamam Aazhchapathippu Magazine
- Malayala Cinemayile S.F. Fareed
- Malayala Manorama
- Mamma Mia Food Court
- Mammootty Times
- Manikinar Souvenir
- Manorama Weekly
- Mathrubhumi Calendar
- Mathrubhumi Varanthapathippu
- MK Fabrics
- Modern Cakes
- Mumbai Police film
- Nana Magazine
- Nana Film Weekly
- Nebula Soap
- New India Assurance
- Parakkat Jewels
- Parisudhan Coconut Oil
- Pesum Padam Magazine
- Ponny Silks
- Rajadhani Restaurant
- Rashtradeepika Cinema Magazine
- Remy Talcum Powder
- Road Safety
- Samson and Sons Builders
- Snehasallapam Magazine
- Spice Garden
- Sreyas Haridasan Photography
- Sukumari Sradhanjali Parambara
- Sukumari Ormakalude Vellithira
- Surya Music
- Tharavadu Restaurant
- Umamaheswara Locket
- Vanitha Magazine
- Vanitha Police film

== See also ==
- Cinema of India
