= List of Top Singer episodes =

Top Singer is a Malayalam musical reality television show broadcasting on Flowers TV. It was created and directed by Sindhu Sridhar. The contest premiered on 1 October 2018.

== Episodes ==
=== Season 1 (2018–2019) ===
No. overall	No. in season	Singers	Songs	Grades	Original release date	Best Performer
Selection Round
1	1	Sivani B Sanjeev; Vaishnavy Panicker	Bhrahmakamalam (Savidham), Ayala Porichathundu (Venalil Oru Mazha); Manjani Poonilavu (Nagarame Nandi), Thambran Thoduthathu Malarambu (Sindooracheppu)	Not Applicable	1 October 2018	Vaishnavy Panicker
Premiere & Inauguration; The show is opened by M.G. Sreekumar introducing the new show. The participants shortlisted for the selection round showcase their talent with small snippets of various popular songs coming in pairs.: Vaishnavy Panicker – Adarsh P Harish; Theertha Sathyan Kottaykkal – Sivani B Sanjeev; Sreebhuvan R; Jaiden Philip – Krishnasree; Soorya Mahadevan – Seethalakshmi Prakash; PK Sooryanarayan – Asna; Sreehari PV – Sneha Johnson; Jennifer Alice – Trisha K Sajeev; Nehal V Ranjith – P Anand Bhairava Sharma; Gowri Krishna – Neha Chavra; Krishnadiya Ajith; The showcase is closed by Krishnadiya Ajith who comes along with the rest of the participants. The show is inaugurated by Innocent in the presence of playback singers M.G. Sreekumar, Sithara Krishnakumar, Sreya Jayadeep and music director M. Jayachandran. Sivani B Sanjeev and Vaishnavy Panicker performed in the selection round. Both of them were selected. The episode closes with Sreya Jayadeep singing Shyamameghame Neeyen – a classic by musical maestro K. J. Yesudas.
2	2	Theertha Sathya; Asna; Aishwarya; Koushik S Vinod	Sangeethame Amara Sallapame (Sargam), Udichu Chandirante (Punjabi House); Ambadi Poonkuyile, Mele Poomala (Madanolsavam); Ponnurukum Pookkalam (Koodevide), Choolamdichu Karanginadakkum (Summer in Bethlehem); Marannuvo Poomakale, Oru Madhura Kinavin (Kanamarayathu)	Not Applicable	2 October 2018	Koushik S Vinod
3	3	Jennifer Alice; P Anand Bhairav Sharma; Seethalakshmi Prakash; Sreebhuvan R	Neela Jalashayathil (Angeekaram), Chundathe Chethippoo (Chronic Bachelor); Neela Nisheedhini (C.I.D. Nazir), Sundari Onnorungi Vaa (Aye Auto); Thamara Kumbilallo (Anweshichu Kandethiyilla), Ammakkoru Ponninkudam; Sagarame Shanthamaaka Nee (Madanolsavam), Chinnamma (Oppam)	Not Applicable	TBA	TBA
4	4	Nehal V Ranjith; Gowri Krishna; Adarsh P Harish; Krishnadiya Ajith	Kannadi Aadyamayen (Sargam), Nandalaala (Independence); Kiliye Kiliye (Aa Raathri), Kasthoori Ente Kasthoori (Vishnulokam); Kalppaanthakaalatholam (Ente Gramam), Maya Devakekku; Ayala Porichathundu (Venalil Oru Mazha), Vennila Chandana (Azhakiya Ravanan)	Not Applicable	TBA	Krishnadiya Ajith
5	5	Trisha K Sajeev; PK Sooryanarayan; MN Hana Fathim; Sneha Johnson	Thane Thirinjum (Ambalapravu), Ayalathe Veettile (Matinee); Innale Mayangumbol (Anweshichu Kandethiyilla), Jillum Jillala (Honey Bee 2: Celebrations); Sruthiyil Ninnuyarum (Thrishna), Velukkumbol (Kuttikkuppayam); Swarna Mukile (Ithu Njangalude Katha), Othiri Othiri (Pranayavarnangal)	Not Applicable	TBA	Sneha Johnson
6	6	Soorya Mahadevan; Neha Chavra; Krishnasree; Sreehari PV	Arikil Nee, Margazhiye Mallikaye (Megham); Aaro Nenjil (Godha), Chandamama (Rock n' Roll); Unaruvegam Nee (Moodalmanju), Kasthuri Thailamittu; Thenum Vayambum (Thenum Vayambum), Mele Poomala (Madanolsavam)	Not Applicable	TBA	Sreehari PV
7	7	Vaishnavy KV; Jaiden Philip; Alenia Sebastian; Devika Sumesh	Vaarmukile (Mazha), Rapadithan (Daisy); Maanikyaveenayumaay (Kattupookkal), Unnam Marannu (In Harihar Nagar); Ammoommakkili (Chandralekha), Manjal Prasaadavum (Nakhakshathangal); Chundari Vave (Sadhrishavakyam 24:29 ), Aararumavatha Kalathu (Chalakkudikkaran Changathi)	Not Applicable	TBA	Devika Sumesh
The episode opened with a violin tribute by Top Band violinist Francis to Balabhaskar who died following an accident. The judges paid their condolences along with guest for the episode – Manoj K Jayan.
8	8	Aditi Dinesh Nair; Avantika Pramod; Thejus K; Gowri KR	Kannuthurakkaatha (Agniputhri), Kannodu Kannidayum (Cousins); Etho Vaarmukilin (Pookkalam Varavayi), Kookuru Kukku Kurukkan (Vellinakshatram); Puliyilakara Pudava (Jaathakam), Velmuruka (Naran); Amruthamayi Abhayamai (Snehaveedu), Naattumaviloru Maina (916)	Not Applicable	TBA	Aditi Dinesh Nair
The episode opened with a solo performance by Manoj K Jayan with the song Paattil ee Paattil (Pranayam ).
9	9	Adithyan Pradeep; Niharika Prem; Aavani P Hareesh	Thankathalikayil Pongalumaay Vanna (Gayathri), Ullaasappoothirikal (Meen); Kathodu Kathoram (Kathodu Kathoram); Maavin Chottile Manamulla (Oru Naal Varum), Dhum Dhum Dhooreyetho (Rakkilippattu)	Not Applicable	TBA	Adithyan Pradeep
10	10	Jermy Jinu; Arunima; Fidha Fathima; Rituraj	Aadi Vaa Kaatte (Koodevide), Ramayanakatte (Abhimanyu); Kannaam Thumpee (Kakkothikkavile Appooppan Thaadikal); Pularkala Sundara (Oru Maymasa Pulariyil), Kaadu Kuliranu (Nellu); Hemanthamen (Kohinoor), Manjaadum (Amar Akbar Anthony)	Not Applicable	TBA	Rituraj
Stage 1
11	11	Krishnadiya Ajith (Favorite Round); Seethalakshmi Prakash (Performance Round)	Ponnum Thinkal Pottum Maane (Onnu Muthal Poojyam Vare); Gujarathi (Pulival Kalyanam)	A; A	TBA	TBA
The episode is opened by a short dance by Esther Anil in the company of the Top Dancers. It is followed by short solo performances by M. G. Sreekumar, M. Jayachandran and Sithara Krishnakumar. Following that, the dance company welcomes the guest star for the episode – Urvashi (actress)
12	12	Vaishnavy Panicker (Devarajan Master Hits); Jaiden Philip (Performance Round); Sneha Johnson (Favorite Round)	Poonthenaruvi (Oru Penninte Katha); Thakilu Pukilu (Raavanaprabhu); Cheerapoovukal (Dhanam)	A; A; A	TBA	Sneha Johnson
13	13	Aditi Dinesh Nair (Devarajan Master Hits); Vaishnavy KV (Favorite Round); Sreebhuvan R (Performance Round)	Sraavana Chandrika (Oru Penninte Katha); Chembarathipoove (Shyama); Kadamizhiyil (Thenkasipattanam)	A; A; A	TBA	Sreebhuvan R
The episode featured Aditi's younger sister Ananya performing 3 songs and impressing the judges. The judges and management was so impressed with Ananya's performance that they gave her a wildcard entry to the show and put her on standby. M. Jayachandran revealed that Ananya was also the title winner for Sun Singer#Season 6.
14	14	Devika Sumesh (Favorite Round); Adithyan Pradeep (Performance Round); Sreehari PV (Favorite Round)	Manathe Marikurumbe (Pulimurugan); Vaaleduthal (Meesa Madhavan); Aakaashamaake (Namukku Parkkan Munthirithoppukal)	A; A+; A	TBA	Adithyan Pradeep
15	15	Theertha Sathyan Kottaykkal (Devarajan Master Hits); Aavani P Hareesh (Performance Round); Rituraj (Favorite Round)	Innenikku Pottukuthaan (Guruvayur Keshavan); Chilamboli Katte (C.I.D. Moosa); Mazhakondu Mathram (Spirit)	A+; A; A	1 November 2018	Theertha Sathyan Kottaykkal
16	16	Thejus K (Devarajan Master Hits); Jennifer Alice (Devarajan Master Hits); Sivani B Sanjeev (Devarajan Master Hits)	Chandrakalabham (Kottaaram Vilkkaanundu); Ezhu Sundara Raathrikal (Ashwamedham); Raajashilpi (Panchavan Kaadu)	A+; A; A	2 November 2018	Thejus K
The episode closed with a solo performance by M.G. Sreekumar just before the announcement of the Best Performer of Day – Thejus K.
17	17	Nehal V Ranjith (Performance Round); Soorya Mahadevan Pillai (Favorite Round); Koushik S Vinod; Alenia Sebastian (Performance Round)	Raaravenu (Mister Butler); Anuraagini (Oru Kudakeezhil); Chandanam Manakkunna (Achuvettante Veedu); Shivamallippoo Pozhikkum (Valliettan)	A; A; A; A	3 November 2018	TBA
The episode opened with a song by M.G. Sreekumar – Karukaruthoru Pennaanu (Njavalppazhangal).
18	18	Vaishnavy Panicker (Favorite Round); Sivani B Sanjeev (Performance Round); PK Suryanarayanan (Favorite Round)	Maanathe Mazhamukil (Kannappanunni); Chellathamare (Hallo); Nisha Surabhi (Ivan Megharoopan)	A+; B+; A+	4 November 2018	PK Suryanarayanan
The episode featured PK Suryanarayanan's father Prem Raj who participated in Idea Star Singer#2008 sing a song along with son Suryanarayanan upon the judges' request.
19	19	Vaishnavy KV (Performance Round); Ananya Dinesh Nair (Favorite Round)	Thaamarakkuruvikku (Achuvinte Amma); Manjani Kombil (Manjil Virinja Pookkal)	A+; A+	5 November 2018	Ananya Dinesh Nair
The episode featured the announcement of the wildcard entry of Ananya Dinesh Nair and her first performance. She even earned the top-most A+ grade for her very first performance and was crowned the Best Performer of the Day.
20	20	Krishnadiya Ajith (Devarajan Master Hits); Theertha Sathya Kottaykkal (Performance Round); Jennifer Alice (Favorite Round)	Paamaram Palunku Kondu (Thriveni); Paikkurumbiye Meykkum (Gramophone); Olichirikkaan Vallikkudilonnorukki (Aranyakam)	A; B; A	6 November 2018	Krishnadiya Ajith
21	21	Koushik S Vinod (Performance Round); Sneha Johnson (Devarajan Master Hits); Alenia Sebastian (Favorite Round)	Pandimelam (Rajamanikyam); Ujjayiniyile (Kadalpalam); Mazhaneer Thullikal (Beautiful)	A+; A+; B	7 November 2018	Koushik S Vinod
22	22	Aditi Dinesh Nair (Performance Round); Nehal V Ranjith (Favorite Round); Rituraj (Devarajan Master Hits)	Kusumavadana (Madhuchandralekha); Kilu Kilum (Neela Ponman); Amme Amme Amme Nammude (Odayil Ninnu)	A Top; A+; A	8 November 2018	Aditi Dinesh Nair
The episode introduced a new grade for Aditi's outstanding 3-in-1 performance – A Top.
23	23	Devika Sumesh (Performance Round); Adithyan Pradeep (Devarajan Master Hits); Jaiden Philip (Devarajan Master Hits)	Katturumbinu Kalyanam (Priyam); Maya Mayooram (Vadakkunokkiyantram); Ashtamudikkaayalile (Manavatty)	A+; B+; A	9 November 2018	Devika Sumesh
24	24	Sreehari PV (Performance Round); Thejus K (Favorite Round)	Kunjante Penninu (Kunjikoonan); Chandana Manivaathil (Marikkunnilla Njan)	A; A	10 November 2018	Thejus K
25	25	Vaishnavy Panicker (Performance Round); Theertha Sathyan Kottaykkal (Favorite Round); PK Suryanarayanan (Devarajan Master Hits)	Dingiripattalam (Pattalam); Kannodu Kannoram (Veeraputhran); Ilavannoor Madhathile (Kadathanaattu Maakkam)	A Top; A; A	11 November 2018	Vaishnavy Panicker
The episode started with a song Kajra Mohabbat Wala (Kismat) by Sithara Krishnakumar. The episode also wished Theertha on her birthday and celebrated it by cutting a cake and sharing it with her parents. Sithara Krishnakumar sang Enthu Paranjaalum from Achuvinte Amma for Theertha.
26	26	Krishnadiya Ajith (Performance Round); Seethalakshmi Prakash (Devarajan Master Hits); Jaiden Philip (Favorite Round)	Chimmi Chimmi (Urumi); Kannaa Aalilakkanna (Devi Kanyakumari); Vaathilppazuthilooden (Idanazhiyil Oru Kaalocha)	A; A Top; B+	12 November 2018	Seethalakshmi Prakash
27	27	Ananya Dinesh Nair (Devarajan Master Hits); Adithyan Pradeep (Devarajan Master Hits); Jennifer Alice (Performance Round)	Chethi Mandaaram Thulasi (Adimakal); Seemanthini Ninte (Athidhi); Chirichiriyo (Chronic Bachelor)	A+; A+; B+	13 November 2018	Adithyan Pradeep
28	28	Sreehari PV (Devarajan Master Hits); Aavani P Hareesh (Favorite Round)	Ente Swapnathin (Achani); Thaaram Vaalkannaadi Nokki (Keli)	A; B+	14 November 2018	Sreehari PV
29	29	Sneha Johnson (Performance Round); Aavani P Hareesh (Devarajan Master Hits); Soorya Mahadevan Pillai (Devarajan Master Hits)	Chingamaasam (Meesa Madhavan); Sundara Swapname (Guruvayur Kesavan); Aayiram Paadasarangal (Nadhi)	B+; B+; A	15 November 2018	Soorya Mahadevan Pillai
30	30	PK Suryanarayanan (Performance Round); Sivani B Sanjeev (Favorite Round); Vaishnavy KV (Devarajan Master Hits)	Kalyanakacheri (Madampi); Mayangi Poyi (Nottam); Kaattil Ilam Kaattil (Odayil Ninnu)	A+; B; A	16 November 2018	PK Suryanarayanan
31	31	Thejus K (Performance Round); Sreebhuvan R (Favorite Round); Nehal V Ranjith (Devarajan Master Hits)	Karu Karu Karuthoru (Balettan); Swargaputhri Navarathri (Nizhalattam); Priyathamaa (Shakunthala)	A; A; A	17 November 2018	Nehal V Ranjith
32	32	Rituraj (Performance Round); Aditi Dinesh Nair (Favorite Round); Alenia Sebastian (Devarajan Master Hits)	Ambalakkara (Black); Dwaarake (Hello Darling); Panchathanthram Kadhayile (Nadhi)	A+; A+; A+	18 November 2018	Rituraj
33	33	Ananya Dinesh Nair (Performance Round); Devika Sumesh	Malamalalooya (Anandabhadram); Melemaanathe (Koottukudumbam)	A Top; A+	19 November 2018	Ananya Dinesh Nair
The episode started with 'Wow Song' by Sithara Krishnakumar.
34	34	Seethalakshmi Prakash (Favorite Round); Soorya Mahadevan Pillai (Performance Round); Koushik S Vinod (Devarajan Master Hits)	Sandye Kanneerithende (Madanolsavam); Enkaralil (Nammal); Premasarvaswame (Swapnabhoomi)	A Top; A; A	20 November 2018	Seethalakshmi Prakash
35	35	Sreehari PV (Character Round); Sneha Johnson (Vayalar Ramavarma Hits Round)	Kasthoori Maanmizhi (Manushya Mrugam); Seethaadevi Swayamvaram (Vaazhve Mayam)	A; A	21 November 2018	TBA
The episode also featured Poornima – a child who didn't speak until the age of 4 and then started speaking after singing a devotional song that was sung by M.G. Sreekumar. The story of Poornima was narrated by M. Jayachandran who then introduced her to the stage. She sang 2 songs on the stage.
36	36	Adithyan Pradeep (Favorite Round); Sreebhuvan R (Favorite Round)	Shyamambaram (Artham); Nilavinte Neela (Agnidevan)	A Top; A Top	22 November 2018	Adithyan Pradeep
37	37	Jaiden Philip (Character Round); Vashnavy KV (Favorite Round); Alenia Sebastian (Vayalar Ramavarma Hits Round)	Dee Dee (Pathinalam Ravinte) (Sharja To Sharja); Katte Nee (Kattu Vannu Vilichappol); Nalacharithathile (Ponnapuram Kotta)	A+; A+; A Top	23 November 2018	Alenia Sebastian
38	38	Vaishnavy Panicker (Character Round); Koushik S Vinod (Favorite Round); Sivani B Sanjeev (Vayalar Ramavarma Hits Round)	Mandachaare Mottathalaya (Sindooracheppu); Pathinaalam Raavudichathu (Maram); Kadali Chenkadali (Nellu)	A; B; B+	24 November 2018	Vaishnavy Panicker
39	39	Ananya Dinesh Nair (Vayalar Ramavarma Hits Round); Seethalakshmi Prakash (Character Round)	Panchaarappaalumittaayi (Bharya); Maanam Thelinge (Thenmavin Kombath)	A Top; A+	25 November 2018	Ananya Dinesh Nair
40	40	Krishnadiya Ajith; Sreebhuvan R (Character Round)	Annarakanna Va (Bhramaram); Kalabham Chaarthum (Thalavattam)	A; A+	26 November 2018	Sreebhuvan R
41	41	Devika Sumesh (Favorite Round); Adithyan Pradeep (Character Round); Vaishnavy KV (Vayalar Ramavarma Hits Round)	Ee puzhayum (Mayookham); Pavizhamalli Poothulanja (Sanmanassullavarkku Samadhanam); Udayagirikkottayile (Aromalunni)	A; A Top; A+	27 November 2018	Adithyan Pradeep
42	42	Jennifer Alice (Character Round); Theertha Sathyan Kottaykkal (Vayalar Ramavarma Hits Round); Rituraj (Character Round)	Shashikala Chaarthiya (Devaraagam); Omanathinkalppakshi (Raagam); Chakkaramaavinte Kombathu (Athbhutha Dweepu)	B; A; A Top	28 November 2018	Rituraj
43	43	Sneha Johnson (Favorite Round); Aditi Dinesh Nair (Vayalar Ramavarma Hits Round); Krishnadiya Ajith (Character Round)	Chaanchaadiyaadi (Makalkku); Naadanpaattile Maina (Raagam); Kettille Kottayathoru (Manyasree Viswamithran)	A Top; A+; A	29 November 2018	Sneha Johnson
The episode started with a song by M.G. Sreekumar – Vezhaambal Kezhum Venalkkudeeram (Olangal).
44	44	Theertha Sathyan Kottaykkal (Character Round); Aavani P Hareesh (Vayalar Ramavarma Hits Round); Rituraj (Favorite Round)	Suruma Nalla Suruma (Kayamkulam Kochunni); Sooryakaanthi (Kattuthulasi); Puthumazhayay Pozhiyam (Mudra)	A Top; A; B	30 November 2018	Theertha Sathyan Kottaykkal
The episode started with a song by Sithara Krishnakumar – Kaathilaaro (Salt Mango Tree).
45	45	Nehal V Ranjith (Favorite Round); Koushik S Vinod (Vayalar Ramavarma Hits Round); Sreehari PV (Character Round)	Mazhavilkodi (Kaanakkuyile) (Swapnam); Kudamullappoovinum (Jwala); Unnikale Oru Kadha Parayam (Unnikale Oru Kadha Parayam)	A Top; A; B+	1 December 2018	Nehal V Ranjith
46	46	Ananya Dinesh Nair (Favorite Round); Thejus K (Character Round)	Enthu Paranjaalum (Achuvinte Amma); Kaneer Mazhayethu (Joker)	A+; A+	2 December 2018	Thejus K
The episode featured choreographer Vishnu Raj and Sithara Krishnakumar perform a short Kuchipudi bit to the tune of Narumugaye from Iruvar to end the episode.
47	47	Vaishnavy Panicker (Vayalar Ramavarma Hits Round); PK Suryanarayanan (Favorite Round); Aditi Dinesh Nair (Character Round)	Kalyani Kalavani (Anubhavangal Paalichakal); Melle Melle (Oru Minnaminunginte Nurunguvettam); Ootypattanam (Kilukkam)	A+; A+; A Ultimate	3 December 2018	Aditi Dinesh Nair
The episode introduced a new grade – A Ultimate for Aditi's ultimate performance in the episode.
48	48	Devika Sumesh (Vayalar Ramavarma Hits Round); Soorya Mahadevan Pillai (Favorite Round); Nehal V Ranjith (Character Round)	Poovukalkku Punyakaalam (Chuvanna Sandhyakal); Poomaanam (Etho Oru Swapnam); Parumala Cheruvile (Spadikam)	B+; A Top; A Top	4 December 2018	Nehal V Ranjith
49	49	Seethalakshmi Prakash (Vayalar Ramavarma Hits Round); Jennifer Alice (Vayalar Ramavarma Hits Round); Jaiden Philip (Favorite Round)	Dhoomthana (Thomasleeha); Kaadambareepushpa Sadassil (Chukku); Pacha Panamthathe (Nottam)	A; A+; A+	5 December 2018	Jaiden Philip
TBA	TBA	Vaishnavy Panicker (Favorite Round); Adithyan Pradeep (Vayalar Ramavarma Hits Round); Sneha Johnson (Character Round)	Aayiram Kannumaay (Nokkethadhoorathu Kannum Nattu); Veena Poove (Jeevikkan Marannupoya Sthree); Pennaale Pennaale (Chemmeen)	A Top; A+; A+	7 December 2018	Vaishnavy Panicker
The episode featured a little singer – Rosemary who gained fame singing songs on the popular Smule (app).
TBA	TBA	Adithyan Pradeep; PK Suryanarayanan, Soorya Mahadevan Pillai	Confusion Theerkaname (Summer in Bethlehem); Thalavarakkoru Thilakkam (Kilukil Pambaram)	Not Applicable	9 December 2018	TBA
50th Episode Celebration; M.G. Sreekumar opened the episode and introduced the judges M. Jayachandran and Sithara Krishnakumar to the stage. On the occasion of the 50th episode, the judges said a few words about how the show had grown successfully. Then the celebrity guest for the day – Jayaram was introduced to the stage. A few participants of the show performed a medley of songs to welcome him to the show. Since the episode was a celebratory episode, it did not follow the traditional format. There were no scoring for any of the performances for the episode.
54	54	Krishnadiya Ajith (Vayalar Ramavarma Hits Round); Sivani B Sanjeev (Favorite Round)	Ambaadi Thannilorunni (Chembarathi); Ponveyil (Nrithasala)	A+; B	10 December 2018	Krishnadiya Ajith
55	55	PK Suryanarayanan (Character Round); Aavani P Hareesh	Omanapuzha (Chanthupottu); Ennodenthinee Pinakkam (Kaliyattam)	A+; A	11 December 2018	TBA
The episode started with a song by M.G. Sreekumar – Panjami Thinkal (Friends). The episode also featured a little singer – Bhagya Sudheer who gained fame singing songs on the popular Smule (app).
56	56	Sreehari PV (Vayalar Ramavarma Hits Round); Vaishnavy KV (Character Round)	Maayaajaalakavaathil (Vivahitha); Kalarivilakku Thelinjathaano (Oru Vadakkan Veeragatha)	A; A+	12 December 2018	Vaishnavy KV
Sithara Krishnakumar sang Ethu Mazhayilum (Udaharanam Sujatha) in between the performances of the episode.
57	57	Koushik S Vinod (Character Round); Sreebhuvan R (Vayalar Ramavarma Hits Round); Theertha Sathyan Kottaykkal (Vayalar Ramavarma Hits Round)	Maane Madhurakkarimbe (Pinnilavu); Manushyan Mathangale (Achanum Bappayum); Paalaazhi Kadanjeduthorazhakaanu (Swami Ayyappan)	A Top; A Ultimate; A+	13 December 2018	Sreebhuvan R
58	58	Aavani P Hareesh (Character Round); PK Suryanarayanan (Vayalar Ramavarma Hits Round); Seethalakshmi Prakash	Puzhayorathil (Adharvam); Indravallari (Gandharvakshetram); Thankathoni (Mazhavilkavadi)	B+; A+; A+	14 December 2018	PK Suryanarayanan
59	59	Aditi Dinesh Nair (Favorite Round); Thejus K (Vayalar Ramavarma Hits Round); Alenia Sebastian (Character Round)	Aaro Viral (Pranayavarnangal); Kaayaampoo Kannil (Nadhi); Meharuba (Perumazhakkalam)	A; A+; A Top	15 December 2018	Alenia Sebastian
60	60	Nehal V Ranjith; Soorya Mahadevan Pillai (Vayalar Ramavarma Hits Round); Ananya Dinesh Nair (Character Round)	Chandrikayilaliyunnu (Bharyamar Sookshikkuka); Onnaam Maanam Poomaanam (Eanippadikal); Doctor Saare (Sandarbham)	A+; B+; A	16 December 2018	Nehal V Ranjith
61	61	Thejus K (Favorite Round); Alenia Sebastian (Favorite Round); Devika Sumesh (Character Round)	Sooryakireedam (Devasuram); Aa Rathri (Panchagni); Machane Va (Mannar Mathai Speaking)	A+; A; A+	17 December 2018	Thejus K
The episode started with a song by M.G. Sreekumar – Sagarame Shanthamaaka Nee (Madanolsavam).
62	62	Soorya Mahadevan Pillai (Character Round); Jennifer Alice (Favorite Round); Jaiden Philip (Vayalar Ramavarma Hits Round)	Paavaada Venam Melaada Venam (Angadi); Seemantharekhayil Chandanamchaarthiya (Aasheervaadam); Devi Sreedevi (Kavyamela)	A Top; A; A	18 December 2018	Soorya Mahadevan Pillai
63	63	Krishnadiya Ajith (Favorite Round); Sneha Johnson (Family Round)	Ellarum Chollanu Ellarum Chollanu (Neelakuyil); Chandanakkaatte (Bheesmacharya)	A+; A Top	19 December 2018	Sneha Johnson
64	64	Vaishnavy Panicker (Johnson Master Round); Soorya Mahadevan Pillai (Devarajan Master Hits); Jennifer Alice (Family Round)	Kunnimani Cheppu (Ponmuttayidunna Tharavu); Sundari Nin Thumbu Kettiyitta (Shalini Ente Koottukari); Aniyathipraavinu (Aniyathipraavu)	A+; A Top; A	20 December 2018	Soorya Mahadevan Pillai
65	65	Ananya Dinesh Nair (Favorite Round); Sivani B Sanjeev (Johnson Master Round); Thejus K (Family Round)	Manjakkilee Swarnakkilee (Sethubandhanam); Manasin Madiyile (Manathe Vellitheru); Pichapoonkaavu (No.20 Madras Mail)	A+; A; A+	21 December 2018	Thejus K
The episode started with a song by Mridula Warrier – Lalee Lalee (Kalimannu).
66	66	Rituraj (Favorite Round); Jaiden Philip (Johnson Master Round); Sivani B Sanjeev (Family Round)	Muthu Mani Thooval (Kauravar); Kanneer Poovinte (Kireedam); Paathiramazha (Ulladakkam)	A Top; A+; A	23 December 2018	Rituraj
The episode started with a song by Sithara Krishnakumar – Vaanamakalunnuvo (Vimaanam). Sithara Krishnakumar ended the episode with a song – Orithiri Edam Tharumo, a Christian devotional song from the album Njanum Ende Eeshoyum.
67	67	Seethalakshmi Prakash; Koushik S Vinod (Johnson Master Round)	Gopike Nin Viral (Kattathe Kilikkoodu); Khalbiloroppana (Narayanam)	A; A Top	24 December 2018	Koushik S Vinod
The episode started with a christian devotional song by M. Jayachandran – Enteyullil. Some contestants of the show presented some Christian devotional songs to celebrate Christmas. Ananya and Sreehari performed Ishtamallada (Swapnakoodu).
68	68	Aditi Dinesh Nair (Favorite Round); Krishnadiya Ajith (Family Round); Alenia Sebastian (Johnson Master Round)	Neela Kurinjikal (Neelakkadambu); Kaithappoovin (Kannezhuthi Pottum Thottu); Kakkakkarumban (Ee Puzhayum Kadannu)	A+; A; A	25 December 2018	Aditi Dinesh Nair
The episode started with a Christian devotional song by M.G. Sreekumar – Daivathin Puthran Janichu. Stephen Devassy also performed Mary's Boy Child during the course of the episode. After the performances for the episode, the judges, along with the participants, celebrated Christmas with Santa Claus. They also cut a Christmas cake to celebrate the occasion. Santa Claus also gave out presents to the judges and the participants.
69	69	Seethalakshmi Prakash (Favorite Round); Theertha Sathyan Kottaykkal (Johnson Master Round); Vaishnavy Panicker (Family Round)	Naadha Neevarum Kaalocha (Chamaram); Ariyaathe Ariyaathe (Oru Katha Oru Nunakkatha); Aaraadhana Nisha Sangeethamela (Nokkethadhoorathu Kannum Nattu)	A Top; A; A Top	26 December 2018	Vaishnavy Panicker
70	70	Vaishnavy KV (Johnson Master Round); Adithyan Pradeep (Family Round)	Panchavarna (Sallapam); Vennila Kadappurathu (Aniyathipraavu)	A Top; A Top	27 December 2018	Adithyan Pradeep
The episode started with a song by Sithara Krishnakumar – Kuhu Kuhu Bole Koyaliya (Suvarna Sundari). The episode also featured the celebration of Vaishnavy's birthday.
71	71	PK Suryanarayanan (Favorite Round); Aavani P Hareesh (Johnson Master Round); Devika Sumesh (Family Round)	Megham Poothu Thudangi (Thoovanathumbikal); Doore Doore Sagaram Thedi (Varavelpu); Chakkikkothoru Chankaran (Achaaram Ammini Osharam Omana)	A; A; A Top	28 December 2018	Devika Sumesh
The episode started with a song by M.G. Sreekumar – Sruthiyil Ninnuyarum (Thrishna).
72	72	Thejus K (Johnson Master Round); Alenia Sebastian (Favorite Round); Sreehari PV (Family Round)	Thoomanjin Nenchilothungi (Samooham); Etho Janma Kalpanayil (Palangal); Kunjuvava (Naadody)	A Ultimate; A; A	29 December 2018	Thejus K
73	73	Koushik S Vinod (Favorite Round); Rituraj (Johnson Master Round); Aditi Dinesh Nair (Family Round)	Devatharu Poothu (Engane Nee Marakkum); Kannipoomaanam Kannum Nattu Njaan (Kelkkaatha Sabdham); Devadoothar Paadi (Kathodu Kathoram)	A Ultimate; A; A Top	30 December 2018	Koushik S Vinod
74	74	Krishnadiya Ajith (Johnson Master Round); Thejus K (Favorite Round); Sreehari PV (Favorite Round)	Chellam Paadi Nadakkunna Pulchaadi (Photographer); Oru Ragamaala Korthu (Dhwani); Onnaanaam Kunninmel (Air Hostess)	A+; A+; A+	31 December 2018	Thejus K
The episode featured Koushik performing Disco Dancer (Golmaal 3).
75	75	Ananya Dinesh Nair (Johnson Master Round); Alenia Sebastian (Family Round)	Kollamkottu Thookkam Nernna (Kudumba Vishesham); Thalirvettilayndo (Dhruvam)	A; A+	1 January 2019	TBA
The episode started with M.G. Sreekumar wishing everyone a Happy New Year and then singing Muthappante Unni from Odiyan. Jaiden Philip sang Bless the Lord after the performances of the episode.
76	76	Sivani B Sanjeev (Favorite Round); Sreebhuvan R (Family Round)	Ethrayo Janmamay (Summer in Bethlehem); Sundariye Sundariye (Oru Maravathoor Kanavu)	A; A Top	2 January 2019	Sreebhuvan R
Rituraj sang Jillam Jillala from Honey Bee 2: Celebrations after the performances for the episode.
77	77	Vaishnavy Panicker (Favorite Round); Adithyan Pradeep (Johnson Master Round)	Annaloonjal (Purappaddu); Ethra Neramaay Njaan (Irattakuttikalude Achan)	A; A Top	3 January 2019	Adithyan Pradeep
Sithara Krishnakumar sang Nanayumee Mazhai from Lailaa O Lailaa after the performances for the episode.
78	78	Aditi Dinesh Nair (Johnson Master Round); Vaishnavy KV (Favorite Round); Jaiden Philip (Family Round)	Iniyonnupaadu (Golanthara Vartha); Indupushpam (Vaishali); Aanalla Pennalla (Njangal Santhushtaranu)	A; B+; A+	4 January 2019	Jaiden Philip
79	79	Aditi Dinesh Nair (Favorite Round); Thejus K (Favorite Round)	Kinavile (Pranchiyettan & the Saint); Neeraaduvaan Nilayil (Nakhakshathangal)	A Ultimate; A Ultimate	5 January 2019	Aditi Dinesh Nair
Aditi performed on short notice as a substitute for Nehal who could not perform for the episode. Aditi's performance earned her an Ultimate grade. The episode was also the first in the history of the show where 2 performances in the same episode were awarded the A Ultimate grade. Later, Ananya performed Rahathulla from Ghajini.
80	80	Jaiden Philip (Favorite Round); Aavani P Hareesh (Family Round); Theertha Sathyan Kottaykkal (Johnson Master Round)	Vezhaambal Kezhum Venalkkudeeram (Olangal); Kaaka Poocha Kokkara (Pappayude Swantham Appoos); Enthe Nee Kanna (Sasneham Sumithra)	A Ultimate; A; A	6 January 2019	Jaiden Philip
81	81	Soorya Mahadevan Pillai (Johnson Master Round); Jennifer Alice (Favorite Round); Vaishnavy KV (Family Round)	Mandaara Cheppundo (Dasharatham); Nettiyil Poovulla (Manivathoorile Aayiram Sivarathrikal); Penne Penne (Meesa Madhavan)	A; B+; A Top	7 January 2019	Vaishnavy KV
The episode started with a song by M. G. Sreekumar – Swarnathaamarayithalil (Shakunthala).
82	82	Devika Sumesh (Favorite Round); PK Suryanarayanan (Family Round); Sneha Johnson (Johnson Master Round)	Ezharapponnana (Akkarapacha); Shankhumvenchamaram (Pattabhishekam); Raja Hamsame Mazhavil (Chamayam)	A; A+; A Ultimate	8 January 2019	Sneha Johnson
83	83	Sreebhuvan R (Favorite Round); Jennifer Alice (Johnson Master Round); Rituraj (Family Round)	Aareyum Bhaava (Nakhakshathangal); Vaidooryakammalaninju (Ee Puzhayum Kadannu); Manthrikochamma Varunnundee (Godfather)	A+; A; A Top	9 January 2019	Rituraj
84	84	Adithyan Pradeep (Favorite Round); Devika Sumesh (Johnson Master Round); Soorya Mahadevan Pillai (Family Round)	Vaisakha Sandhye (Nadodikkattu); Kannanennu Peru (Irattakuttikalude Achan); Thankamanassu (Rappakal)	A+; B+; A+	10 January 2019	Adithyan Pradeep
The episode ended with a song by Sithara Krishnakumar – Aayilyam (Thondimuthalum Driksakshiyum).
85	85	Sneha Johnson; Sreebhuvan R (Johnson Master Round); Seethalakshmi Prakash (Family Round)	Doore Mamarakkombil (Varnapakittu); Paathira Pullunarnnu (Ee Puzhayum Kadannu); Swapanam Theyajichal (Rakshasa Rajavu)	A+; A+; A+	11 January 2019	Seethalakshmi Prakash
86	86	Ananya Dinesh Nair (Family Round); PK Suryanarayanan (Johnson Master Round); Aavani P Hareesh (Favorite Round)	Aanachandam (Gajakesariyogam); Pavizhampol (Namukku Parkkan Munthirithoppukal); Neelakkuyile Cholloo (Adhwaytham)	A Ultimate; A+; A	12 January 2019	Ananya Dinesh Nair
The episode started with a song by Sithara Krishnakumar – Mazhavil Kaavile (Kinar).
87	87	Sreehari PV (Johnson Master Round); Nehal V Ranjith (Favorite Round); Koushik S Vinod (Family Round)	Aakashagopuram (Kalikkalam); Maanasamanivenuvil (Moodalmanju); Paalnilaavinum (Kabooliwala)	A+; A+; A Top	13 January 2019	Koushik S Vinod
The episode started with a song by M. G. Sreekumar – Ambalappuzhe (Adhwaytham).
Stage 2
88	88	Sreebhuvan R (Favorite Round); Jennifer Alice (Vayalar – Devarajan Round); Vaishnavy KV (Favorite Round); Adithyan Pradeep (Audience Round)	Aalapanam Thedum Thaimanam (Ente Sooryaputhrikku); Periyaare (Bharya); Poru Nee Vaarilam (Kashmeeram); Chettikkulangara	A+; A+; A	14 January 2019	Jennifer Alice
The episode introduced a new Round to the show with 3 rounds – Vayalar – Devarajan Round, Favorite Round and Performance Round. The episode also featured the judges starting to inform contestants of the marks scored by them in the past 3 rounds.
89	89	Krishnadiya Ajith (Favorite Round); Nehal V Ranjith (Vayalar – Devarajan Hits Round); Jaiden Philip (Performance Round); Sreebhuvan R (Audience Choice)	Minnum Minna Minni (No. 1 Snehatheeram Bangalore North); Sooryakaantha Kalppadavil (Punarjanmam); Inneetheeram Thedum (Prabhu); Minnaminnikkum (Kattappanayile Rithwik Roshan)	A; A+; A+	15 January 2019	Jaiden Philip
90	90	Rituraj (Favorite Round); Sneha Johnson (Vayalar – Devarajan Hits Round); Theertha Sathyan Kottaykal (Performance Round); PK Suryanarayanan (Audience Choice)	Snehathin Poonchola (Pappayude Swantham Appoos); Daivaputhranu (Aranazhika Neram); Marikkoodinullil (Kaalapani); Velmuruka (Naran)	A+; A; A	16 January 2019	Rituraj
The episode started with a song by Mridula Warrier – Snehithane Snehithane (Alaipayuthey).
91	91	Aavani P Hareesh (Favorite Round); Sreehari PV (Vayalar – Devarajan Hits Round); Alenia Sebastian (Performance Round); Nehal V Ranjith (Audience Choice)	Ormakal Odi (Mukunthetta Sumitra Vilikkunnu); Sreenagarathile (Nilakkatha Chalanangal); Neelakkanna (Vendor Daniel State Licency); Aarumukhan (Mulla)	A; A; A Top	17 January 2019	Alenia Sebastian
The episode started with a song by M. G. Sreekumar – Kunjikkiliye Koodevide (Indrajaalam).
92	92	Sivani B Sanjeev (Favorite Round); Vaishnavy Panicker (Vayalar – Devarajan Hits Round); PK Suryanarayanan (Performance Round); Theertha Sathyan Kottaykkal (Audience Choice)	Ennu Varum (Kannaki); Ellaarum Paadathu (Ningalenne Communistakki); Shanthamee Ratriyil (Johnnie Walker); Cham Cham (Mallu Singh)	A+; A Top; A Top	18 January 2019	PK Suryanarayanan
93	93	Krishnadiya Ajith (Vayalar – Devarajan Hits Round); Aavani P Hareesh (Vayalar – Devarajan Hits Round); Thejus K (Performance Round); Vaishnavy KV (Audience Choice)	Thedivarum Kannukalil (Swami Ayyappan); Kannuneer Muthumaay (Nithyakanyaka); Thechippoove (Radholsavam); Mazha Paadum (Sunday Holiday)	A; A; A+	19 January 2019	Thejus K
The episode started with a song by Sithara Krishnakumar – Madhu Chandhika (Ente Ummante Peru).
94	94	Vaishnavy Panicker (Favorite Round); Theertha Sathyan Kottaykkal (Favorite Round); Adithyan Pradeep (Performance Round)	Veene Veene (Aalolam); Araliyum Kadaliyum (Jaathakam); Mada Prave Vaa (Madanolsavam)	A Ultimate; A; A	20 January 2019	Vaishnavy Panicker
95	95	Sreehari PV (Favorite Round); Koushik S Vinod (Favorite Round); Sneha Johnson (Performance Round); Jennifer Alice (Audience Choice)	Pathirakkili (Kizhakkan Pathrose); Vellara Poomala Mele (Varavelpu); Minnal Kaivala (Harikrishnans); Manju Peyyana (Chandranudikkunna Dikkil)	A; A; A	21 January 2019	Koushik S Vinod
The episode featured Koushik's father present the judges with acrylic-painted portraits of each of them. He also sang a song on the stage.
96	96	Rituraj (Vayalar – Devarajan Hits Round); Devika Sumesh (Vayalar – Devarajan Hits Round); Sreebhuvan R (Performance Round); Sivani B Sanjeev (Audience Choice)	Devaloka Radhavumaay (Vivahitha); Kaattu Vannu Kallane Pole (Karakanakadal); Oru Vallam Ponnum (Minnaram); Kaikkottum Kandittilla (Oru Vadakkan Selfie)	A; A; A Ultimate	22 January 2019	Sreebhuvan R
The episode featured members from Devutty Fans Group visit the show and donate many gifts (including a gold bracelet and bangle) to Devika. The group also collected ₹25,000 as a donation for her.
169	169	Jaiden Philip (Favorite Round); Devika Sumesh (Black & White Round); Koushik S Vinod (Raveendran Hits Round); Rituraj (Audience Choice)	Nee En Sarga Soundaryame (Kathodu Kathoram); Onnaamtharam (Snehadeepam); Champakulam Thachan (Champakulam Thachan); Podimeesa (Pa Va)	A Top; A Top; A Wow	6 April 2019	Koushik S Vinod
The episode featured a song Pookkal Panineer (Action Hero Biju) sung by celebrity guest Manoj K Jayan and Ananya Dinesh Nair. Later, Aditi Dinesh Nair danced to Udi Udi Jaye from Raees. Later, Sreebhuvan R and Nehal V Ranjith sang Sundhari Neeyum Sundharan Njanum from Michael Madana Kama Rajan.
Stage 3
250	250	Soorya Mahadevan Pillai (Evergreen Round); Nehal V Ranjith (Favorite Round); Rituraj (Family Round); Vaishnavy KV (Audience Choice)	Sandhyakkenthinu Sindooram; Yamune Nee Ozhukoo (Thulavarsham); Vote (Classmates); Neelakasham (Jomonte Suvisheshangal)	A Ultimate; A Wow; A Ultimate	27 June 2019	Nehal V Ranjith
251	251	Thejus K (Favorite Round); Koushik S Vinod (Evergreen Round); Sivani B Sanjeev (Family Round); Sneha Johnson (Audience Choice)	Ottakambi Naadam (Thenum Vayambum); Annu Ninte Nunakkuzhi (Pareeksha); Dum Dum Dum Dundubhinaadam (Vaisali); Ente Khalbile (Classmates)	A Wow; A Ultimate; A Top	28 June 2019	Thejus K
252	252	Seethalakshmi Prakash (Family Round); Soorya Mahadevan Pillai (Retry – Family Round); Vaishnavy Panicker (Favorite Round); Koushik S Vinod (Audience Choice)	Vadhoovaranmaare (Jwala); Thala Melam (Vietnam Colony); Thamburu Kulir Choodiyo (Soorya Gayathri); Kannimanga Prayathil	A Top; A Wow; A Ultimate	29 June 2019	Soorya Mahadevan Pillai
The episode started with a song by M.G. Sreekumar – Oru Dhalam Mathram. The episode had students and faculty from Smrithi School for Children with Special Needs, Kaloor. The students were brought to the stage floor and interacted and sang with the judges. The students had also brought with them gifts for the judges and the host Meenakshi. The episode also featured a duet by judges M.G. Sreekumar and Anuradha Sriram – Meena Venalil (Kilukkam).
253	253	Thejus K (Family Round); Krishnadiya Ajith (Evergreen Round); Sivani B Sanjeev (Favorite Round); Nehal V Ranjith (Audience Choice)	Ganapathi (Abhimanyu); Omalaale Kandu Njan (Sindooracheppu); Shalabhamaay (Kalimannu); Aaru Paranju (Pulival Kalyanam)	A Extreme; A Ultimate; A Top	30 June 2019	Thejus K
The episode featured a duet by M.G. Sreekumar and Ananya Dinesh Nair – Onnaanaam Kunninmel (Air Hostess).
254	254	Aavani P Hareesh (Favorite Round); Adithyan Pradeep (Evergreen Round); Devika Sumesh (Family Round); Rituraj (Audience Choice)	Manikuyile (Valkannadi); Maanasa Nilayil (Dhwani); Kanakam Moolam Dukham (Interview); Perariyaathoru Nombarathe (Sneham)	A Ultimate; A Wow; A Ultimate	1 July 2019	Adithyan Pradeep
The episode opened with a solo performance by Anuradha Sriram – Malargaley (Love Birds).
255	255	Jaiden Philip (Favorite Round); Nehal V Ranjith (Evergreen Hits Round); Sreebhuvan R (Family Round); Krishnadiya Ajith (Audience Choice)	Neelavana Cholayil (Premabhishekham); Sourayoodhathil (Swapnam); Eeshwara chintayithonne; Minnaminni (Koode)	A Top; A Wow; A Wow	2 July 2019	Nehal V Ranjith
256	256	Aditi Dinesh Nair (Evergreen Hits Round); Soorya Mahadevan Pillai (Favorite Round); Krishnadiya Ajith (Family Round); Thejus K (Audience Choice)	Navakaabhishekam Kazhinju (Guruvayur Kesavan); Indulekha Kanthurannu (Oru Vadakkan Veeragatha); Nammalu Koyyum (Rakthasakshikal Sindabad); Utharayana Kili Paadi	A Ultimate; A Ultimate; A Wow	3 July 2019	Krishnadiya Ajith
The episode opened with a song by M.G. Sreekumar – Sararanthal Ponnum Poovum (Thudar Katha)
257	257	Sneha Johnson (Evergreen Hits Round); Aavani P Hareesh (Family Round); Rituraj (Favorite Round); Ananya Dinesh Nair (Audience Choice)	Thushaarabindukkale (Aalinganam); Chanchala (Ishtam); Thekku Thekku (Ezhupunna Tharakan); Kattu Mooliyo (Ohm Shanthi Oshaana)	A Wow; A Top; A Extreme	4 July 2019	Rituraj
258	258	Theertha Sathya Kottaykkal (Evergreen Hits Rounds); PK Suryanarayanan (Evergreen Hits Rounds); Nehal V Ranjith (Family Round)	Mainaakam Kadalil Ninnuyarunnuvo (Thrishna); Priyamullavale (Thekkan Kattu); Kalyaana Rathriyil (Kuttikkuppayam)	A Ultimate; A Top; A Wow	5 July 2019	Nehal V Ranjith
The episode had Anuradha Sriram sing Dil Cheez Kya Hai from Umrao Jaan instead of the Audience Choice performance by the participants.
259	259	Adithyan Pradeep (Favorite Round); Jennifer Alice (Evergreen Hits Round); Sreehari PV (Family Round); Sreebhuvan R (Audience Choice)	Kandu Njan (Abhimanyu); Maranjirunnaalum (Sayoojyam); Oru Roopanottukoduthal (Lottery Ticket); Nashta Swargangale Ningalenikkoru (Veena Poovu)	A Ultimate; A Top; A Ultimate	6 July 2019	Sreehari PV
The episode opened with a song by M.G. Sreekumar – Swarnathaamarayithalil (Shakunthala). After the participants' performances, Vidhu Prathap sang Oru Dhalam Mathram before the Audience Choice performance by Sreebhuvan R
260	260	Theertha Sathyan Kottaykkal (Favorite Round); Devika Sumesh (Evergreen Hits Round); Ananya Dinesh Nair (Family Round); Nehal V Ranjith (Audience Choice)	Enthennariyathoraaradhana (Theerthadanam); Kunukkitta Kozhi (Chembarathi); Chinnakkutti Chellakkutti Thankakkatti (Revathikkoru Pavakkutty); Kilukil Pamparam (Kilukkam)	Second Chance; A Wow; A Extreme	7 July 2019	Ananya Dinesh Nair
The episode opened with a song by Vidhu Prathap – Mangalam Nerunnu (Hridayam Oru Kshethram). Theertha was given a second chance to perform her song another time after more practice. This second chance was given to her by the judges because her performance was not up to standards and her talent according to the judges. The episode also featured a birthday wish and celebration with cake-cutting for Aditi. It was a surprise planned by her family as part of Ananya's Family Round performance. Vidhu Prathap and Mridula Warrier performed Ennum Ninne (Aniyathipraavu) before the Audience Choice performance by Nehal.
261	261	Vaishanavy KV (Favorite Round); Aditi Dinesh Nair (Family Round); Rituraj (Evergreen Hits Round); Theertha Sathyan Kottaykkal (Audience Choice)	Vaishakha Pournamiyo (Parinayam); Nandakishora Hare (Ekalavyan); Thankathala Thaalam (Ennennum Kannettante); Minnedi Minnedi (Naran)	A Ultimate; A Ultimate; A Wow	8 July 2019	Rituraj
The episode opened with a song by Mridula Warrier – Swarna Mukile (Ithu Njangalude Katha).
262	262	Jaiden Philip (Favorite Round); Sreehari PV (Performance Round); Nehal V Ranjith (Dakshinamoorthy Swamy Hits Round); Adithyan Pradeep (Audience Choice)	Malayala Bhashathan (Prethangalude Thazhvara); Kunjikkiliye Koodevide (Indrajaalam); Swapnangal Swapnangale (Kavyamela); Minnaminunge	A Ultimate; A Ultimate; A+	9 July 2019	Sreehari PV
The episode opened with a song by M.G. Sreekumar – Ormakal Ormakal (Randu Janmam). The episode also celebrated Anuradha Sriram's birthday with the Top Singer family.
263	263	Aavani P Hareesh (Evergreen Hits Round); Seethalakshmi Prakash (Favorite Round); Sneha Johnson (Family Round); Jaiden Philip (Audience Choice)	Ezhilam Paala Poothu (Kaadu); Pularaaraayappol (Mooladhanam); Kattile Mainaye (Akashadoothu); Thaarake Mizhiyithalil (Choola)	A Top; A Ultimate; A Ultimate	10 July 2019	Seethalakshmi Prakash
The episode opened with a song by Mridula Warrier – Na Jiya Lage Na (Anand).
264	264	Vyshnavy KV (Evergreen Hits Round); Koushik S Vinod; Vaishnavy Panicker (Family Round); Sneha Johnson (Audience Choice)	Kadaleevanangalkkarikilallo (Othenente Makan); Kannuneerthulliye (Panitheeratha Veedu); Kannil Poovu (Vishukkani); Yerusalem Nayaka	A Ultimate; A Extreme; A Wow	11 July 2019	Koushik S Vinod
The episode opened with a song by M.G. Sreekumar – Jayadeva Kaviyude Geethikal before which he spoke about his brother M. G. Radhakrishnan who died on 2 July 2010. He dedicated the song in memory of his elder brother. The episode also showed a video message from M. Jayachandran who was missing the episode to complete work on his latest project – Marconi Mathai.
265	265	Jennifer Alice (Favorite Round); Thejus K (Favorite Round); Adithyan Pradeep (Performance Round); Devika Sumesh (Audience Choice)	Thattam Pidichu Valikkale (Paradesi); Devadundhubhi (Ennennum Kannettante); Lallalam Chollunna (Vietnam Colony); Varuthante Oppam Olichu Chadiye Thankame	A Ultimate; A Wow; A Ultimate	12 July 2019	Thejus K
266	266	Sreebhuvan R (Dakshinamoorthy Swamy Hits Round); Seethalakshmi Prakash (Performance Round); Ananya Dinesh Nair (Favorite Round); Vaishnavy Panicker (Audience Choice)	Manohari Nin Manoradhathil (Lottery Ticket); Shivakaradhamarukalayamaay Naadam (Kochu Kochu Santhoshangal); Pookkalam Vannu Pookkalam (Godfather); Ishtam Ishtam (Amrutham)	A Ultimate; A Wow; A Extreme	13 July 2019	Ananya Dinesh Nair
Ananya earned A Extreme grade for her performance. This was her second consecutive A Extreme. Vidhu Prathap and Anuradha Sriram performed Valaiosai from Sathya.
267	267	Adithyan Pradeep (Dakshinamoorthy Swamy Hits Round); Theertha Sathyan Kottaykkal (Performance Round); Krishnadiya Ajith (Favorite Round); Sneha Johnson (Audience Choice)	Kaattile Paazhmulam (Vilakku Vangiya Veena); Puthan Valakkare (Chemmeen); Engane Njan (Desadanam); Sraavana Chandrika (Oru Penninte Katha)	A Extreme; A Ultimate; A Ultimate	14 July 2019	Adithyan Pradeep
The episode opened by a short song by M.G. Sreekumar – Chakravarthini Ninakku (Chembarathi). Vidhu Prathap and Anuradha Sriram performed Pehla Nasha (Jo Jeeta Wohi Sikandar).
268	268	Jennifer Alice (Dakshinamoorthy Swamy Hits Round); Vaishnavy KV (Favorite Round); Nehal V Ranjith (Performance Round); Ananya Dinesh Nair (Audience Choice)	Paattupaadiyurakkaam (Seeta); Akale (Akale); Kizhakkudikkile (Aadyakiranangal); Mel Mel Mel (Ustad Hotel)	A Top; A Top; A Wow	15 July 2019	Nehal V Ranjith
Vidhu Prathap sang Ilavannoor Madhathile from Kadathanaattu Maakkam after the participants' performances before the Audience Choice performance by Ananya.
269	269	Theertha Satyan Kottaykkal (Retry – Favorite Round); Thejus K (Dakshinamoorthy Swamy Hits Round); Ananya Dinesh Nair (Performance Round); Seethalakshmi Prakash (Audience Choice)	Enthennariyathoraaradhana (Theerthadanam); Aaraattinaanakal (Sasthram Jayichu Manushyan Thottu); Thambrante Manjal Mooli (Naadody); Innenikku Pottukuthaan (Guruvayur Kesavan)	A Wow; A Ultimate; A Ultimate	16 July 2019	Theertha Sathyan Kottaykkal
The episode opened with a song by Anuradha Sriram – Tere Bina Zindagi Se (Aandhi).
270	270	Soorya Mahadevan Pillai (Favorite Round); Aavani P Hareesh (Performance Round); Sreehari PV (Dakshinamoorthy Swamy Hits Round); Koushik S Vinod (Audience Choice)	Kaathil Thenmazhayaay (Thumboli Kadappuram); Maarikko Maarikko (Onningu Vannengil); Eeshwaran Manushyanaayavatharichu (Sree Guruvayoorappan); Maanennum Vilikkilla (Neelakuyil)	A Ultimate; A Wow; A Wow	17 July 2019	Sreehari PV
The episode celebrated Sreehari's birthday.
271	271	Sreebhuvan R (Favorite Round); Seethalakshmi Prakash (Dakshinamoorthy Swamy Hits Round); Rituraj (Performance Round); Soorya Mahadevan Pillai (Audience Choice)	Poomakal (Kattu Vannu Vilichappol); Ellaam Neeye Shoure (Sreemad Bhagavad Geetha); Pooparikkaan (Kannaki); Nalikerathinte (Thurakkatha Vathil)	A Wow; A Wow; A Ultimate	18 July 2019	Sreebhuvan R
The episode opened with a song by M.G. Sreekumar – Sagarame Shanthamaaka Nee (Madanolsavam).
272	272	Sneha Johnson (Favorite Round); Koushik S Vinod (Dakshinamoorthy Swamy Hits Round); Devika Sumesh (Performance Round); Ananya Dinesh Nair (Audience Choice)	Jalasankhu pushpam (Ahimsa); Chenthengu Kulacha (Maaya); Kothumbuvallam Thuzhanjuvarum (Ningalenne Communistakki); Panchavarnnakkulire Paalaazhikkadavil (Sooryaputhran)	A Wow; A Wow; A Wow	19 July 2019	Sneha Johnson
Anuradha Sriram sang Kalyaana Thaen Nilaa (Mounam Sammadham) after the participants' performances before the Audience Choice performance by Ananya.
273	273	Soorya Mahadevan Pillai (Dakshinamoorthy Swamy Hits Round); Sivani B Sanjeev (Favorite Round); Vaishnavy Panicker (Performance Round); Sreehari PV (Audience Choice)	Harshabaashpam Thooki (Muthassi); Aakashagangayude Karayil (Omanakuttan); Pachamalappanamkuruvi (Arakkallan Mukkalkkallan); Thaamara Poonkaavanathil Thaamasikkunnoley (Balyakalasakhi)	A Double Wow; A Top; A Double Wow	20 July 2019	Soorya Mahadevan Pillai
The episode opened with a song by M.G. Sreekumar – Oru Dhalam Mathram. The episode introduced a new grade – A Double Wow when it was first awarded to Soorya Mahadevan Pillai for his near-perfect performance. Vaishnavy Panicker was also awarded A Double Wow for her performance. Vidhu Prathap and Anuradha Sriram sang Pudhu Vellai Mazhai (Roja) after the participants' performances before the Audience Choice performance by Sreehari PV.
274	274	PK Suryanarayanan (Favorite Round); Ananya Dinesh Nair (Dakshinamoorthy Swamy Hits Round); Sreebhuvan R (Performance Round); Krishnadiya Ajith (Audience Choice)	Anuraagagaanam Pole (Udhyogastha); Kannum Pooti Urangu (Snehaseema); Kuppivala (Ayal Kadha Ezhuthukayanu); Thaippooyakkaavadiyaattam (Kannur Deluxe)	A Top; A Wow; A Wow	21 July 2019	Sreebhuvan R
Upon the request of host Meenakshi, M.G. Sreekumar sang one of his latest songs Tha Tharikida (Pathinettam Padi) before the Audience Choice performance by Krishnadiya.
275	275	Seethalakshmi Prakash (Favorite Round); Aavani P Hareesh (Dakshinamoorthy Swamy Hits Round); Sreehari PV (Favorite Round); Sivani B Sanjeev (Audience Choice)	Madhuram Gayathi (Banaras); Thamasaa Nadiyude (Danger Biscuit); En Swaram Poovidum (Anupallavi); Mounam Polum Madhuram (Sagara Sangamam)	A Extreme; A Ultimate; A Ultimate	22 July 2019	Seethalakshmi Prakash
276	276	Nehal V Ranjith (Favorite Round); PK Suryanarayanan (Performance Round); Vaishnavy Panicker (Dakshinamoorthy Swamy Hits Round); Rituraj (Audience Choice)	Mindathedi (Thanmathra); Devaraagame (Prem Poojari); Vaikkathashtami Naalil (Bharyamar Sookshikkuka); Mazha Peythu Maanam Thelinja Neram (Oru Abhibhashakante Case Diary)	A Wow; A Top; A Extreme	23 July 2019	Vaishnavy Panicker
Vidhu Prathap sang one of his latest songs before the Audience Choice performance by Rituraj.
277	277	Thejus K (Performance Round); Jennifer Alice (Favorite Round); Rituraj (Favorite Round)	Dhim Dhim Dheemi Dheemi (Maanthrikam); Nilavinte Poonkavil (Sreekrishna Parunthu); Sooryanay Thazhuki (Sathyam Sivam Sundaram)	A Wow; A Ultimate; A Wow	24 July 2019	Thejus K
The episode opened with a song by M.G. Sreekumar – Ellarum Chollanu Ellarum Chollanu (Neelakuyil).
278	278	Theertha Sathyan Kottaykkal (Dakshinamoorty Swamy Hits Round); Sivani B Sanjeev (Performance Round); Devika Sumesh (Favorite Round); Vaishnavy Panicker (Audience Choice)	Manassilunaroo (Marunnattil Oru Malayali); Manavaalan Paara (Kakka); Bhagavaanoru Kuravanaayi (Vaazhve Mayam); Nee Manimukilaadakal (Vellithira)	A Wow; A+; A Ultimate	25 July 2019	Theertha Sathyan Kottaykkal
Vidhu Prathap and Anuradha Sriram sang Kuchh Na Kaho (1942: A Love Story) before the Audience Choice performance by Vaishnavy Panicker.
279	279	Adithyan Pradeep (Favorite Round); Aditi Dinesh Nair (Performance Round); Rituraj (Dakshinamoorthy Swamy Hits Round)	Saamyamakannorudyaaname (Devi); Ooru Sanam Odi Vannu (Meleparambil Anveedu); Njan Njan Njanenna (Brahmachari)	A Extreme; A Top; A Wow	26 July 2019	Adithyan Pradeep
The episode opened by a song by M.G. Sreekumar – Kathirola Panthalorukki (Peruvannapurathe Visheshangal).
280	280	Devika Sumesh (Dakshinamoorthy Swamy Hits Round); Koushik S Vinod (Favorite Round); Soorya Mahadevan Pillai (Performance Round); Rituraj (Audience Choice)	Thamburu Thaane Shruthi Meetti (Ente Mohangal Poovaninju); Paavamam Kishna (Adhwaytham); Sundari Sundari (Aye Auto); Raavu Nilaappoovu (Sneham)	A Ultimate; A Ultimate; A Extreme	27 July 2019	Soorya Mahadevan Pillai
The episode opened by a song by M.G. Sreekumar – Mada Prave Vaa (Madanolsavam). Anuradha Sriram sang Rasathi Unnai from Vaidehi Kathirunthal. Later, Vaishnavy KV and M.G. Sreekumar performed Mele Poomala from Madanolsavam before the Audience Choice performance Rituraj.
281	281	Thejus K (P Bhaskaran Hits Round); Rituraj (Favorite Round); Nehal V Ranjith (Performance Round); Vaishnavy Panicker (Audience Choice)	Vijanatheerame (Rathrivandi); Aakasha Deepangal (Raavanaprabhu); Maattupetti Koyilile (Mayilattam); Manikya Kuyile Nee (Thudar Katha)	A Extreme; A Ultimate; A Triple Wow	28 July 2019	Thejus K
The episode introduced a new round to the show – P Bhaskaran Round in memory of poet and lyricist P. Bhaskaran. The episode also introduced a new grade – A Triple Wow for Nehal's brilliant performance. Anuradha Sriram performed "Innum Konjam Neram" from Maryan after the main performances for the episode. M.G. Sreekumar and Sneha Johnson performed "Neela Ponmane" from Nellu after Anu's performance.
282	282	Vaishnavy KV (Dakshinamoorthy Swamy Hits Round); Jaiden Philip (Performance Round); Vaishnavy Panicker; Jennifer Alice (Audience Choice)	Kaakkakuyile Cholloo (Bharthavu); Hridaya Sakhi Nee Arikil Varoo (Kinnaram); Kavilathe Kanneer Kandu (Anweshichu Kandethiyilla); Maavilakudil (Ramante Edanthottam)	A Ultimate; A Top; A Triple Wow	29 July 2019	Vaishnavy Panicker
283	283	Aditi Dinesh Nair (Favorite Round); PK Suryanarayanan (Dakshinamoorthy Swamy Hits Round); Sneha Johnson (Performance Round); Ananya Dinesh Nair (Audience Choice)	Chillu Jaalaka (Classmates); Kaarkoonthal Kettilenthinu (Urvashi Bharathi); Thennal Vannathum (Kabooliwala); Vellimoonga (Vellimoonga)	A Wow; A Ultimate; A Top	30 July 2019	Aditi Dinesh Nair
284	284	Theertha Sathyan Kottaykkal (Favorite Round); Sivani B Sanjeev (Dakshinamoorthy Swamy Hits Round); Koushik S Vinod (Performance Round)	Mazhayil Rathri Mazhayil (Karutha Pakshikal); Sougandhikangale Vidaruvin (Paathira Sooryan); Kaduvaye Kiduva (Thachiledathu Chundan)	A Top; A Ultimate; A Triple Wow	31 July 2019	Koushik S Vinod
The episode opened with a song by M.G. Sreekumar – "Ore Raaga Pallavi" from Anupallavi.
285	285	Aditi Dinesh Nair (Dakshinamoorthy Swamy Hits Round); Aavani P Hareesh (Favorite Round); Vaishnavy KV (Performance Round); Thejus K	Induchoodan Bhagavaante (Thacholi Marumakan Chandu); Pandoru Kaattiloraansimham (Sandarbham); Dhum Dhum Dhooreyetho (Rakkilippattu); Anuvaadamillaathe Akathu Vannu (Puzha)	A Top; A Double Wow; A Extreme	1 August 2019	Vaishnavy KV
286	286	Sneha Johnson (Dakshinamoorthy Swamy Hits Round); Jaiden Philip (Dakshinamoorthy Swamy Hits Round); Jennifer Alice (Performance Round); Vaishnavy KV (Audience Round)	Ente Kayyil Poothiri (Sammanam); Kaakkathamburaatti (Inapraavugal); Thennalaadum (Kandu Kandarinju); Mazhathullikal (Vettam)	A Double Wow; A Ultimate; A Ultimate	2 August 2019	Sneha Johnson
287	287	Sreehari PV (Favorite Hits Round); PK Suryanarayanan (P Bhaskaran Hits Round); Seethalakshmi Prakash (Performance Round)	Kaattukurinjipoovu (Radha Enna Pennkutti); Thaamasamenthe Varuvan (Bhargavi Nilayam); Choolamadichu (Summer in Bethlehem)	A Ultimate; A Wow; A Ultimate	3 August 2019	PK Suryanarayanan
The episode opened with a song by M.G. Sreekumar – "Hridayasarassile" (Padunna Puzha). M.G. Sreekumar and Vaishnavy Panicker performed "Ashtamudikkaayalile" from Manavatty instead of the Audience Choice performance.
288	288	Thejus K (Favorite Hits Round); Sreebhuvan R (Performance Round); Ananya Dinesh Nair (Favorite Round); Nehal V Ranjith (Audience Choice)	Aaraattu Kadavinkal (Venkalam); Mallikappoo (Madhuchandralekha); Jwalamukikal (Padheyam); Chembarathipoove (Shyama)	A Extreme; A Wow; A Double Wow	4 August 2019	Thejus K
The episode opened with a song by M.G. Sreekumar – Devi Nin Roopam. M. Jayachandran graded Thejus 10 / 10 for his heart-touching performance, for the first time in the history of the Flowers Top Singer show. Anuradha Sriram sang "Ovvoru Pookalume" from Autograph after the participants' performance for the episode. Next, Seethalakshmi and M.G. Sreekumar sang "Ivide Kaattinu Sugandham" from Raagam before the Audience Choice performance by Nehal.
289	289	Krishnadiya Ajith (Performance Round); Adithyan Pradeep (P Bhaskaran Hits Round); Theertha Sathyan Kottaykkal (Favorite Round)	Vaa Kuruvi Inakkuruvi (Punnaram Cholli Cholli); Chempakappoonkaavanathile (Aabhijathyam); Aakaashaganga (Kunjattakilikal)	A Wow; A Double Wow; A Top	5 August 2019	Adithyan Pradeep
The episode opened with a song by M.G. Sreekumar – "Madhurapratheekshathan" (Bhagyamudra).
290	290	Soorya Mahadevan Pillai (P Bhaskaran Hits Round); Sivani B Sanjeev (Performance Round); Seethalakshmi Prakash (Favorite Round)	Kanniyil Pirannaalum (Tharavattamma); Mele Vinnil (Ezhupunna Tharakan); Nanda Suthaavara (Parvathy)	A Ultimate; A+; A Ultimate	6 August 2019	Seethalakshmi Prakash
Vidhu Prathap sang "Nilaave Vaa" from Mouna Ragam after the performances for the episode.
291	291	Vaishnavy KV (Favorite Round); PK Suryanarayanan (Favorite Round); Vaishnavy Panicker (Performance Round)	Puthu Mazhayayi vannu nee (Aakasha Ganga); Raavin Nilakkayal (Mazhavillu); Kuyil Paattil (Aparichithan)	A Double Wow; A Ultimate; A Double Wow	7 August 2019	Vaishnavy Panicker, Vaishnavy KV
The episode opened with a song by Vidhu Prathap – "Nee Madhu Pakaro" from Moodalmanju.
292	292	Devika Sumesh (P Bhaskaran Hits Round); Nehal V Ranjith (Favorite Round); Krishnadiya Ajith (P Bhaskaran Hits Round); Theertha Sathyan Kottaykkal (Audience Choice)	Nazhiyuri Paalu (Rarichan Enna Pauran); Mallesaayaka (Sooryavamsham); Velutha Penne (Nairu Pidicha Pulivalu); Olanajali Kuruvi (1983)	A Wow; A Extreme; A Ultimate	8 August 2019	Nehal V Ranjith
293	293	Soorya Mahadevan Pillai (Performance Round); Aavani P Hareesh (Favorite Round); Adithyan Pradeep (Performance Round)	Chingavanathaazhathe (Nirakudam)); Maranno Nee Nilaavil (Five Star Hospital); Oru Madhura Kinavin (Kanamarayathu)	A Wow; A Wow; A Extreme	9 August 2019	Adithyan Pradeep
294	294	Sreebhuvan R; Jennifer Alice (Performance Round); Ananya Dinesh Nair (P Bhaskaran Hits Round); Soorya Mahadevan Pillai (Audience Choice)	Poomukham Vidarnnal (Karunyam); Nandalaala (Independence); Oonjaale Ponnoonjaale (Aadyakiranangal); Kannipoomaanam Kannum Nattu Njaan (Kelkkaatha Sabdham)	A Ultimate; A Ultimate; A Triple Wow	10 August 2019	Ananya Dinesh Nair
295	295	Adithyan Pradeep (Favorite Round); Vaishnavy KV (P Bhaskaran Hits Round); Rituraj (Performance Round); Ananya Dinesh Nair (Audience Choice)	Shyaamasundara Pushpame (Yudhakaandam); Mazhamukiloli Varnnan (Aabhijathyam); Unnam Marannu (In Harihar Nagar); Maine Pyar Kiya (C.I.D. Moosa)	A Ultimate; A Wow; A Double Wow	11 August 2019	Rituraj
The episode opened with a song by M.G. Sreekumar – "Oru Poovithalin" from Agnidevan. M.G. Sreekumar sang "Kanal Veedukal" dedicating it to all the mothers of the world.
296	296	Koushik S Vinod (P Bhaskaran Hits Round); Soorya Mahadevan Pillai (Favorite Round); Devika Sumesh (Performance Round); Sreehari PV (Audience Choice)	Allaavin Kaarunyamillenkil (Yatheem); Samayamithapoorva (Harikrishnans); Ithu Bappa Njan Umma (Kuppivala); Maarivil (Drishyam)	A Wow; A Wow; A Wow	12 August 2019	Soorya Mahadevan Pillai
The episode opened with a song by M.G. Sreekumar – "Chandrathundin Ponpira". Vidhu Prathap sang "Monjulla Pennalle" from album Laila Majnu after the performances for the episode.
297	297	Jaiden Philip (Favorite Round); Aditi Dinesh Nair (Performance Round); Sreehari PV (P Bhaskaran Hits Round); Adithyan Pradeep (Audience Choice)	O Mrudule (Njan Ekananu); Priyanu Matram (Robin Hood); Pakakkinaavin Sundaramaakum (Pakalkkinavu); Chandanathil (Sasthram Jayichu Manushyan Thottu)	A Double Wow; A Ultimate; A Ultimate	13 August 2019	Jaiden Philip
298	298	Aavani P Hareesh (P Bhaskaran Hits Round); Sneha Johnson (P Bhaskaran Hits Round); Ananya Dinesh Nair (Performance Round); Devika Sumesh (Audience Choice)	Manjanippoonilaavu (Nagarame Nandi); Pathivaayi Pournami (Aadyakiranangal); Appolum Paranjille (Kadamba); Palo Palo Nalla Nadappalam	A Ultimate; A Wow; A Double Wow	14 August 2019	Ananya Dinesh Nair
The episode opened with a song by M.G. Sreekumar – "Kannum Pooti Urangu" from Snehaseema.
299	299	Sreebhuvan R (P Bhaskaran Hits Round); Theertha Sathyan Kottaykkal (Performance Round); Vaishnavy Panicker	Mallikabaanan Thante (Achani); Arikathu Njammalu Bannotte (College Girl); Mounam Polum Madhuram (Sagara Sangamam)	A Wow; A Double Wow; A Extreme	15 August 2019	Vaishnavy Panicker
The episode opened with a dance performance by the dance crew celebrating independence day. Later, the participants of the show sang Vande Mataram to open the episode for the day. All the judges gave short speeches on the topic of independence. M.G. Sreekumar and Vidhu Prathap emphasised the 2019 Kerala floods and urged the viewers to help in the disaster relief activities and to take care of the environment.
300	300	Sneha Johnson (Favorite Round); Aditi Dinesh Nair (P Bhaskaran Round); Sreehari PV (Performance Round); Aavani P Hareesh (Audience Choice)	Kalabham Tharaam (Vadakkumnadhan); Madhurapratheekshathan (Bhagyamudra); Nenjil Kanjabaanam (Gandharvam); Nee Mukilo (Uyare)	A Ultimate; A Double Wow; A Double Wow	16 August 2019	Sreehari PV
301	301	Jaiden Philip (P Bhaskaran Hits Round); Vaishnavy KV (Performance Round); Rituraj (P Bhaskaran Hits Round)	Anuvaadamillaathe Akathu Vannu (Puzha); Mele mukilin (Pandippada); Kaayalonnu Chirichal (Kakka)	A Ultimate; A Wow; A Wow	17 August 2019	Vaishnavy KV
302	302	Jennifer Alice (P Bhaskaran Hits Round); Koushik S Vinod (Performance Round); Krishnadiya Ajith (P Bhaskaran Hits Round); Theertha Sathyan Kottaykkal (Audience Choice)	Thaalathil Thaalathil (Chenda); Munnottu Munnottu (Vishukkani); Ente Makan Krishnanunni (Udayam); Thane Thirinjum (Ambalapravu)	A Ultimate; A Double Wow; A Ultimate	18 August 2019	Koushik S Vinod
The episode opened with a song by M.G. Sreekumar – "Sharadindu Malardeepa" from Oolkatal. Vidhu Prathap ended the episode with "Innale Ente" from Balettan.
303	303	Seethalakshmi Prakash (P Bhaskaran Hits Round); Sivani B Sanjeev (Favorite Round); Sneha Johnson (Performance Round)	Eeranuduthukondambaram (Iruttinte Athmavu); Manjin Vilolamam (Utharam); Chundathu (Chronic Bachelor)	A Extreme; A Ultimate; A Ultimate	19 August 2019	Seethalakshmi Prakash
The episode featured Mr. Joy Iype, a whistling artist who retired as a banker from Canara Bank and used to perform in Doordarshan 30 years ago. He donated ₹25,000 to contestant Adithyan Pradeep. He also performed "Oru Mukham Maathram" from Etho Oru Swapnam.
304	304	Koushik S Vinod; Jennifer Alice (Favorite Round); Thejus K (Performance Round); Seethalakshmi Prakash (Audience Choice)	Kinaavil Edanthottam (Eden Thottam); Ilakozhiyum Sisirathil (Varshangal Poyathariyathe); Vennakallin (Pattalam); Eeran Kaattin (Salalah Mobiles)	A Wow; A Ultimate; A Wow	20 August 2019	Koushik S Vinod
The episode opened with a song by Vidhu Prathap – "Poomuthole" from Joseph.
305	305	Theertha Sathyan Kottaykkal (P Bhaskaran Hits Round); PK Suryanarayanan (Performance Round); Vaishnavy Panicker (P Bhaskaran Hits Round); Aditi Dinesh Nair (Audience Choice)	Aa Viral Nulliyaal (Swantham Sarika); Njalippurakkale (Sammanam); Nidrathan Neeraazhi (Pakalkkinavu); Mouname (Thakara)	A Ultimate; A Wow; A Triple Wow	21 August 2019	Vaishnavy Panicker
306	306	Nehal V Ranjith (P Bhaskaran Hits Round); Aavani P Hareesh (Performance Round); Devika Sumesh	Vaakachaarthu Kazhinjoru (Iruttinte Athmavu); Ammoommakkili (Chandralekha); Entho Etho (Itha Ivide Vare)	A Double Wow; A Wow; A Double Wow	22 August 2019	Devika Sumesh
Vidhu Prathap and Anuradha Sriram sang "Tharapatham Chethoharam" from Anaswaram after the performances of the day.
307	307	Thejus K (Johnson Master Round); Adithyan Pradeep (Black & White Performance Round); Krishnadiya Ajith; Jaiden Philip (Audience Choice)	Oonjaalurangi (Kudumbasammetham); Aattuvanchi (Kaymkulam Kochunni); Thumbi Thumbi Vava (Koodappirappu); Hridayathin (Karayilekku Oru Kadal Dooram)	A Wow; A Ultimate; A Wow	23 August 2019	Thejus K
The episode introduced 2 new rounds to the show – Johnson Master Round in memory of music director Johnson Master and Black & White Performance Round.
308	308	Nehal V Ranjith (Performance Round); PK Sooryanarayan (Johnson Master Round); Ananya Dinesh Nair; Sivani B Sanjeev (Audience Choice)	Parippuvada Pakkavada (Sneha Yamuna); Poothaalam Valam Kayilenthi Vaasantham (Kalikkalam); Aayiram Kaathamakaleyaanenkilum (Harshabashpam); En Kanimalare (Philips and the Monkey Pen)	A Extreme; A Wow; A Double Wow	24 August 2019	Nehal V Ranjith
The episode opened with a song by M.G. Sreekumar – "Karayunno Puzha" from Murappennu.
309	309	Aavani P Hareesh; Sreebhuvan R (Black & White Performance Round); Rituraj (Johnson Master Round); Aditi Dinesh Nair (Audience Choice)	Aalila Manjalil (Soorya Gayathri); Sindoorappottuthottu (Rakthapushpam); Ente Manveenayil (Neram Pularumbol); Vaisakha Sandhye (Nadodikkattu)	A Wow; A Ultimate; A Extreme	25 August 2019	Rituraj
Vidhu Prathap sang "Unnikale Oru Kadha Parayam" from Unnikale Oru Kadha Parayam to close the episode for the day.
310	310	Aditi Dinesh Nair; Sivani B Sanjeev (Johnson Master Round); Jaiden Philip (Black & White Performance Round); Kosuhik S Vinod (Audience Choice)	Jalashayyayil (Laptop); Manassinullil (Thurakkatha Vathil); Ullaasappoothirikal (Meen); Ponne Ponnambili (Harikrishnans)	A Double Wow; A Top; A Triple Wow	26 August 2019	Jaiden Philip
The episode opened with a duet song by Anuradha Sriram and Vidhu Prathap – "Ambalappuzhe" from Adhwaytham.
311	311	Seethalakshmi Prakash (Johnson Master Round); Jennifer Alice (Black & White Performance Round); Vaishnavy Panicker (Johnson Master Round); Nehal V Ranjith (Audience Choice)	Manassinte Moham (Football); Chithravarnapushpajaalamorukki (Ayalathe Sundari); Devakanyaka (Ee Puzhayum Kadannu); Kaathil Thenmazhayaay (Thumboli Kadappuram)	A Triple Wow; A Wow; A Extreme	27 August 2019	Vaishnavy Panicker
The episode opened with a song by M.G. Sreekumar – "Thaliritta Kinaakkal" from Moodupadam.
312	312	Thejus K; Aavani P Hareesh; Sreehari; Vaishnavy Panicker (Audience Choice)	Swarga Gayike (Mooladhanam); Kasthoorithailamittu (Kadalpalam); Shararaanthal Thirithaanu (Kayalum Kayarum); Ishtamalle (Chocolate)	A Extreme; A Wow; A Ultimate	28 August 2019	Thejus K
The episode opened with a song by Anuradha Sriram – "Kuzhaloodum Kannanukku" from Mella Thirandhathu Kadhavu. The episode celebrated Thejus' birthday on stage after his performance.
313	313	Jaiden Philip (Black & White Performance Round); Sivani B Sanjeev (Johnson Master Round); Rituraj (Favorite Round)	Hippikalude Nagaram (Postmane Kananilla); Nee Nirayoo Jeevanil Pulakamaay (Prema Geethangal); Aarodum Mindaathe (Chinthavishtayaya Shyamala)	A Ultimate; A Top; A Extreme	29 August 2019	Rituraj
The episode celebrated Top Band's rhythm programmer Linu Lal's birthday after the performances for the episode.
314	314	Aditi Dinesh Nair (Johnson Master Round); Sreebhuvan R (Favorite Round); Devika Sumesh (Black & White Performance Round); Soorya Mahadevan Pillai (Audience Choice)	Vellithinkal (Meleparambil Anveedu); Koothambalathil Vecho (Appu); Anthimayangiyallo (School Master); Neelamalappoonkuyile (Ponnum Poovum)	A Wow; A Ultimate; A Extreme	30 August 2019	Devika Sumesh
315	315	Seethalakshmi Prakash; Jennifer Alice (Favorite Round); Krishnadiya Ajith	Ee Kaikalil (Ee Ganam Marakkumo); Kanna Guruvayoorappa (Ponnethooval); Peelikkannezhuthi (Snehasagaram)	A Triple Wow; A Top; A Wow	31 August 2019	Seethalakshmi Prakash
The episode opened with a song by Vidhu Prathap and Anuradha Sriram – "Azhake Ninmizhi" from Amaram.
316	316	Theertha Sathyan Kottaykkal (Johnson Master Round); Sreehari PV (Black & White Performance Round); Adithyan Pradeep (Favorite Round); Rituraj (Audience Choice)	Aadi Vaa Katte (Koodevide); Paalaanu Thenaanen (Umma); Hridayaavahini Ozhukunnu Nee (Chandrakantham); Kudamulla Kammalaninjal (Ee Parakkum Thalika)	A Wow; A Wow; A Double Wow	1 September 2019	Adithyan Pradeep
The episode opened with a song by Vidhu Prathap – "Mizhiyariyaathe" from Niram. The episode featured a viewer Mr. Thomas donate ₹25,000 to Adithyan Pradeep. Vidhu Prathap and Devika Sumesh performed "Pon Veene" from Thalavattam after the performances for the episode before the Audience Choice performance by Rituraj.
317	317	Jaiden Philip; Aavani P Hareesh (Johnson Master Round); Soorya Mahadevan Pillai (Black & White Performance Round)	Manikuttikkurumbulla (Kaliyoonjal); Pular Veyilum (Angene Oru Avadhikkalathu); Tharivalakal (Chattambikkalyaani)	A Ultimate; A Double Wow; A Wow	2 September 2019	Aavani P Hareesh
318	318	Thejus K (Black & White Performance Round); Vaishnavy KV (Johnson Master Round); Sivani B Sanjeev (Black & White Performance Round)	Pavizham Konduru Kottaaram (Pushpanjali); Pallitherundo (Mazhavilkavadi); Poomuttathoru Mulla Virinju (Rarichan Enna Pauran)	A Wow; A Wow; A Wow	3 September 2019	Sivani B Sanjeev
The episode ended with a duet performance by Vidhu Prathap and Anuradha Sriram – "Thendral Vandhu" from Thendrale Ennai Thodu.
319	319	Koushik S Vinod; Sneha Johnson (Johnson Master Round); Krishnadiya Ajith (Black & White Performance Round); Theertha Sathyan Kottaykkal (Audience Choice)	Sangamam Sangamam (Thriveni); Moham Kondu Njan (Sesham Kazhchayil); Ammakku Njanoru (Archana); Chinnamma (Oppam)	A Ultimate; A Extreme; A Wow	4 September 2019	Sneha Johnson
The episode opened with a song by Vidhu Prathap – "Poonkaattinodum" from Poomukhappadiyil Ninneyum Kaathu.
320	320	Vaishnavy KV (Johnson Master Round); PK Suryanarayanan; Ananya Dinesh Nair (Black & White Performance Round); Koushik S Vinod (Audience Choice)	Maayapponmaane (Thalayana Manthram); Thaalamayanju (Pavithram); Thallu Thallu (Aabhijathyam); Israyelin Naathanaayi (Idhayathin Aazhathil)	A Wow; A Double Wow; A Double Wow	5 September 2019	PK Suryanarayanan
M. G. Sreekumar sang a song from one of his latest songs from the movie Kochiyude Thaarangal – "Kochikkari Kochu Penne"
321	321	Nehal V Ranjith; Soorya Mahadevan Pillai (Johnson Master Round); Vaishnavy Panicker (Black & White Performance Round); Sneha Johnson (Audience Choice)	Swarajathi Paadum (Varaphalam); Enthe Kannanu (Photographer); Peraattin Karayil Vachu (Kuppivala); Nilaave Maayumo (Minnaram)	A Wow; A Double Wow; A Double Wow	6 September 2019	Soorya Mahadevan Pillai
The episode opened with a song by Vidhu Prathap – "Ramzanile Chandrikayo" from Alibabayum 41 Kallanmaarum. Vidhu Prathap also sang "Pavizhampol" from Namukku Parkkan Munthirithoppukal. The episode celebrated Vaishnavy Panicker's birthday on the stage. Vaishnavy got emotional after watching a video message that her father had sent to her wishing her on her birthday since he could not be with her.
322	322	Devika Sumesh (Favorite Round); Koushik S Vinod (Johnson Master Round); PK Suryanarayanan (Black & White Performance Round); Jaiden Philip (Audience Choice)	Chinnukkutty Urangeele (Oru Nokku Kanan); Ambalakkombante Kombathirunnu (Saadaram); Kandu Randu Kannu (Chuzhi); Hridayathin (Karayilekku Oru Kadal Dooram)	A Wow; A Double Wow; A Ultimate	7 September 2019	Koushik S Vinod
Vidhu Prathap sang "Neermizhippeeliyil" from Vachanam. The episode also showed a few participants visit well known carnatic musician as well as a composer Perumbavoor G. Raveendranath and spend time with him.
323	323	Ananya Dinesh Nair (Johnson Master Round); Adithyan Pradeep (Johnson Master Round); Vaishnavy KV (Black & White Performance Round); Jaiden Philip (Audience Choice)	Thankanilaa (Snehasagaram); Madhuram Jeevamrutha (Chenkol); Velukkumbol (Kuttikkuppayam); Muttathe Mulle (Mayavi)	A Top; A Double Wow; A Ultimate	8 September 2019	Adithyan Pradeep; Best Performer of the Week : Koushik S Vinod
Anuradha Sriram opened the episode with a song – "Kathodu Kathoram" from Kathodu Kathoram. The episode featured Ananya – a blind child singer who went viral on social media singing "Nee Mukilo" from Uyare.
324	324	Soorya Mahadevan Pillai; Jaiden Philip; Koushik S Vinod (Black & White Performance Round); Jennifer Alice	Chakravarthini Ninakku (Chembarathi); Vishwam Kaakkunna Naadha (Veendum Chila Veettukaryangal); Kozhikkottangaadeele (Thankakudam); Kannoram Chinkaaram (Rathinirvedam)	A Double Wow; A Ultimate; A Extreme	9 September 2019	Koushik S Vinod
Anuradha Sriram sang "Sendhoora Poove" from Senthoora Poove. The episode featured singer Latha Raju visit the show. She was adorned with the customary "Ponnada" by Anuradha Sriram.
325	325	Sreebhuvan R (Johnson Master Round); Theertha Sathyan Kottaykkal; Rituraj (Black & White Performance Round)	Mounathin Idanaazhiyil (Malootty); Ente Sindoora Reghayil (Sindoora Rekha); Maniyaanchettikku (Chandanachola)	A Double Wow; A Ultimate; A Extreme	10 September 2019	Rituraj
M.G. Sreekumar sang an Onam-related song to start the episode.
333	326	Devika Sumesh (Johnson Master Round); Sneha Johnson; Aditi Dinesh Nair (Black & White Performance Round); Adithyan Pradeep; Soorya Mahadevan Pillai (Audience Choice)	Sundarikkutty Chirikkunna (Akkacheyude Kunjuvava); Nee Januvariyil Viriyumo (Rose Blue Rose) (Akale); Madhurappoovana (Kuppivala); Vaakappoomaram (Anubhavam); Chandrakalabham (Kottaaram Vilkkaanundu)	A Ultimate; A Ultimate; A Wow	18 September 2019	Aditi Dinesh Nair
The episode featured a video message from Vidhu Prathap from Australia. He also conveyed a message from viewers and fans from Australia who had requested him to ask Adithyan to sing "Vaakappoomaram" from Anubhavam.
334	327	Sivani B Sanjeev; Sreehari PV (Johnson Master Round); Seethalakshmi Prakash (Black & White Performance Round); Vaishnavy KV (Audience Choice); Aavani P Hareesh	Thumbapoo (Randidangazhi); Manchaadimanikondu (Aadhaaram); Yamune Yadukula Rathidevanevide (Rest House); Kiliye Kiliye (Aa Raathri); Etho Vaarmukilin (Pookkalam Varavayi)	A Wow; A Wow; A Wow	19 September 2019	Sreehari PV
Srinivas sent a video message to the show requesting to listen to Aavani's song.
335	328	Theertha Sathyan Kottaykkal (Black & White Performance Round); Jennifer Alice (Johnson Master Round); Aditi Dinesh Nair; Devika Sumesh (Audience Choice)	Kalithozhimarenne Kaliyaakki (Murappennu); Valakilungi Kaalthala Kilungi (Ithiri Neram Othiri Karyam); Priyamanasa Nee (Chilamboli); Ambalakkulakkadavil (MLA Mani: Patham Classum Gusthiyum)	A Ultimate; A Ultimate; A Extreme	20 September 2019	Aditi Dinesh Nair
336	329	Not Applicable	Not Applicable	Not Applicable	21 September 2019	Not Applicable
Interaction with Mega Star Mammootty; The episode featured an interaction session of the participants with actor Mammootty. He was visiting the show as part of the promotion of his new film – Ganagandharvan directed by Ramesh Pisharody. Pisharody, who has visited the show in the past as a judge, was also present during the session. The participants interacted with the actor and spent time with him. They sang many songs and had a good time with the actor.
Stage 4
337	330	Thejus K; Aavani P Hareesh (Performance Round); Krishnadiya Ajith, Sreehari PV (Duet Round)	Karunamayi (Itha Oru Snehagatha); Cham Cham (Mallu Singh); Karale Karalinte (Udayananu Tharam)	A Triple Wow; A Ultimate; A Double Wow	22 September 2019	Thejus K Best Performer of the Week : Thejus K
The episode introduced 3 new rounds to the show – Favorite Round, Duet Round and Performance Round. The judges also began to announce the marks scored by the participants in the last 5 rounds. Thejus K emerged in the first position in this stage. Flowers TV promised that the winner would get an opportunity to sing a song in a film. Srinivas joined as a judge. He sang "Kuyila Pudichchu" from Chinna Thambi.
338	331	Sneha Johnson (Black & White Performance Round); PK Suryanarayanan; Vaishnavy Panicker; Theertha Sathyan Kottaykkal (Audience Choice)	Pallanayaarin Theerathil (Ningalenne Communistakki); Vaalinmel Poovum (Pavithram); Kanne Kanmani (Mazhamegha Pravukal); Pathirakkili (Kizhakkan Pathrose)	A Ultimate; A Double Wow; A Extreme	23 September 2019	Vaishnavy Panicker
The episode opened with a song by Biju Narayanan – "Shyamambaram" from Artham.
339	332	Soorya Mahadevan Pillai (Favorite Round); Sreebhuvan R, Vaishnavy KV (Duet Round); Sivani B Sanjeev (Performance Round); Aditi Dinesh Nair (Audience Choice)	Aval Chirichal (Vilakku Vangiya Veena); Thaamarakkili Paadunnu (Moonnam Pakkam); Vijana Surabhi (Bachelor Party); Mazhavilkodi (Kaanakkuyile) (Swapnam)	A Extreme; A Ultimate; A Ultimate	24 September 2019	Soorya Mahadevan Pillai
The episode opened with a song by Srinivas – "Ethrayo Janmamay" from Summer in Bethlehem.
340	333	Theertha Sathyan Kottaykkal (Performance Round); Sneha Johnson, Soorya Mahadevan Pillai (Duet Round); Rituraj (Favorite Round); Seethalakshmi Prakash (Audience Choice)	Balla Balla (Punjabi House); Oru Naru Pushpamayi (Meghamalhar); Pinne Ennodonnum (Shikkar); Mazhanila (Vikramadithyan)	A Ultimate; A Extreme; A Triple Wow	25 September 2019	Sneha Johnson, Soorya Mahadevan Pillai
The episode celebrated Rituraj's birthday on the stage with the judges.
341	334	Aavani P Hareesh; Jaiden Philip, Jennifer Alice (Duet Round); Krishnadiya Ajith (Performance Round); Ananya Dinesh Nair (Audience Choice)	Mazhayulla Rathriyil (Kadha); Swargangal Swapnangal Kaanum (Malootty); Mele Poomala (Madanolsavam); Poove Oru Manimutham (Kaiyethum Doorath)	A Double Wow; A Wow; A Ultimate	26 September 2019	Aavani P Hareesh
Representatives of Ananya Fans Association visited the show to present Ananya with an Electronic keyboard and a Guitar. They also donated ₹25,000 to the charitable show of Flowers (TV channel) – Anantharam via Ananya. Vidhu Prathap sang "Lailakame" from Ezra
342	335	Sreebhuvan R (Favorite Round); Vaishnavy Panicker; Adithyan Pradeep (Performance Round); Thejus K (Audience Choice)	Paadam Pootha Kaalam (Chithram); Minnaram Maanathu (Guru); Poonthennale Nee (Sayam Sandhya); Anuraagini (Oru Kudakeezhil)	A Ultimate; A Triple Wow; A Wow	27 September 2019	Vaishnavy Panicker
The episode opened with a song by Vidhu Prathap – "Neelavana Cholayil". After Sreebhuvan's song, M Jayachandran requested Srinivas to sing his portion from Snehithane Snehithane (Alaipayuthey) and the latter described how the song was created in A. R. Rahman's studio. Anuradha Sriram and Vidhu Prathap joined Srinivas to sing the pallavi and anupallavi. The episode celebrated Adithyan's birthday on the stage along with the judges. Adithyan's birthday cake was sponsored by a Dr. Babu. He also made a financial donation for Adithyan.
343	336	Adithyan Pradeep (Favorite Round); Ananya Dinesh Nair (Performance Round); Jaiden Philip, Koushik S Vinod (Duet Round); Theertha Sathyan Kottaykkal (Audience Choice)	Chandrakiranathin (Mizhineerppoovukal); Kavilinayil (Vandanam); Anthi Kadappurathu (Chamayam); Olichirikkaan Vallikkudilonnorukki (Aranyakam)	A Wow; A Double Wow; A Extreme	28 September 2019	Jaiden Philip, Koushik S Vinod; Best Performer of the Week : Jaiden Philip & Koushik S Vinod
The episode featured the family of Top Band Keyboardist Faisal Muhammad's (wife and 3 children) visit the stage. His wife sang a song as well.
344	337	Ananya Dinesh Nair, Rituraj; Soorya Mahadevan Pillai; Adithyan Pradeep, Theertha Sathyan Kottaykkal; Vaishnavy Panicker, Sreehari PV; Aditi Dinesh Nair, Srinivas; Vidhu Prathap, Anuradha Sriram	Kallayi Kadavathe (Perumazhakkalam); Mizhiyil (Mayaanadhi); Nee Himamazhayayi (Edakkad Battalion 06); Jeevamshamayi Thaane (Theevandi); Minsara Poove (Padayappa); Aaro Nenjil (Godha)	Not Applicable	29 September 2019	Not Applicable
The episode featured actor Tovino Thomas visit Top Singer. The performances for the episode were not judged or graded. The episode also celebrated the occasion of Flowers (TV channel) being the number 1 Television channel on Television content rating charts on Onam day by cutting a cake along with celebrity guest for the day – Tovino Thomas.
345	338	Vaishnavy KV; Aditi Dinesh Nair (Performance Round); Aavani P Hareesh, PK Suryanarayanan (Duet Round); Soorya Mahadevan Pillai (Audience Choice)	Velipparuthi Poove (Oru Yugasandhya); Kannane Kandu Sakhi (Poochakkoru Mookkuthi); Kadalariyilla Karayariyilla (Kannur); Pravahame (Sargam)	A Ultimate; A Double Wow; A Ultimate	30 September 2019	Aditi Dinesh Nair
The episode started with a song by Anuradha Sriram – Vaseegara from Minnale. Mridula Warrier sang "Shyaamameghame Nee" from Adhipan before the Audience Choice song by Soorya Mahadevan Pillai.
346	339	Jennifer Alice (Favorite Round); Koushik S Vinod (Performance Round); Seethalakshmi Prakash, Theertha Sathyan Kottaykkal (Duet Round); Sneha Johnson (Audience Choice)	Swayamvara Subhadina (Sujatha); Kombedu Kuzhaledu (Thandavam); Ghanashyaama (Kochu Kochu Santhoshangal); Ambilikkombathe Ponnoonjaalil (Kaattile Paattu)	A Wow; A Double Wow; A Double Wow	1 October 2019	Koushik S Vinod
The episode started with a song by Mridula Warrier – "Avidunnen Gaanam Kelkkaan" from Pareeksha. M. Jayachandran gifted a book, he had authored reflecting on his relationship with his mentor G. Devarajan Master – Varika Gandharvagayaka, to Seethalakshmi and Theertha. Biju Narayanan sang "Pathu Veluppinu" from Venkalam.
347	340	Devika Sumesh; Jaiden Philip; Vaishnavy Panicker (Performance Round); Rituraj (Audience Choice)	Eeran Megham (Chithram); Naladamayanthi Kadhayile (Rowdy Ramu); En Chundil Raagamandaaram (Kaadu); Kathoramaaro (Arthana)	A Wow; A Wow; A Extreme	2 October 2019	Vaishnavy Panicker
The episode featured a lyrical song by Anuradha Sriram – "Aaradhike" from Ambili.
348	341	Koushik S Vinod; Adithyan Pradeep, Seethalakshmi Prakash (Duet Round); Sreebhuvan R (Performance Round); Vaishnavy Panicker	Karukaruthoru Pennaanu (Njavalppazhangal); Oh Priya Priya! (Geethanjali); Kaithudi Thaalam Thatti (Kalyanaraman); Thotturummi (Rasikan)	A Triple Wow; A Wow; A Extreme	3 October 2019	Sreebhuvan R
The episode opened with a song by Mridula Warrier – "Raaree Raareeram" from Onnu Muthal Poojyam Vare.
349	342	Sneha Johnson; Ananya Dinesh Nair	Nizhalaay Ozhukivarum (Kalliyankattu Neeli); Ambalamillathe Aaltharayil (Padamudra)	A Extreme; A Ultimate	4 October 2019	
The episode opened with a song by Mridula Warrier – "Gopike Nin Viral" from Kattathe Kilikkoodu.
350	343	Nehal V Ranjith; Jaiden Philip (Performance Round); Krishnadiya Ajith, Devika Sumesh (Duet Round); Vaishnavy KV (Audience Choice)	Maangalyapoovilirikkum (Sasneham); Punchirichal Poonilavudikkum (Sreedevi); Aalippazham Perukkaan (My Dear Kuttichathan); Thumbi Vaa Thumbakudathin (Olangal)	A Ultimate; A Double Wow; A Extreme	5 October 2019	Krishnadiya Ajith, Devika Sumesh
This episode had Shakthisree Gopalan join as a judge. She sang a few lines from "Nenjukkule" from Kadal as requested by M Jayachandran after Nehal's song.
351	344	Jennifer Alice (Performance Round); Theertha Sathyan Kottaykkal; Ananya Dinesh Nair, Rituraj (Duet Round); Adithyan Pradeep (Audience Choice)	Nettimele Pottittaalum (Valliettan); Theduvathethoru (Vaisali); Shukriya Shukriya (Niram); Aaro Viral (Pranayavarnangal)	A Ultimate; A Triple Wow; A Extreme	6 October 2019	Ananya Dinesh Nair, Rituraj
After Jennifer's performance, M Jayachandran requested Vidhu Prathap and Shakthisree Gopalan to sing Ottagathai Kattiko from Gentleman while M.G. Sreekumar echoed the last word of each stanza. Later, after Rituraj and Ananya's performance and before Adithyan's Audience Choice song, Vidhu Prathap sang "Priyamullavale" from Thekkan Kattu.
352	345	Aditi Dinesh Nair; Seethalakshmi Prakash (Performance Round); Vaishnavy Panicker, Sreehari PV (Duet Round); Thejus K (Audience Choice)	Ariyunnilla Bhavaan (Kattukurangu); Mangala Deepavumaay (Kaikudunna Nilavu); Kolakkuzhal Vili Ketto (Nivedyam); Ambalappuzhe (Adhwaytham)	A Ultimate; A Wow; A Double Wow	7 October 2019	Vaishnavy Panicker, Sreehari PV
353	346	Sivani B Sanjeev; Thejus K (Performance Round); Sneha Johnson, PK Suryanarayanan (Duet Round); Aditi Dinesh Nair (Audience Choice)	Chirakaala Kaamitha (Manoradham); Margazhiye Mallikaye (Megham); Penne En Penne (Udayananu Tharam); Walking in the moonlight (Sathyam Sivam Sundaram)	A Wow; A Extreme; A Double Wow	8 October 2019	Thejus K
The episode started with visuals of the participants of the show visit Dakshina Mookambika Temple, North Paravur and get the blessings of Sri Mookambika Devi on the occasion of Navaratri. They also were seen chanting hymns and songs at the temple. Later, M. G. Sreekumar also sang a Keerthana on the show's stage.
354	347	Devika Sumesh (Performance Round); Sreehari PV; Adithyan Pradeep, Sreebhuvan R (Duet Round); Sivani B Sanjeev (Audience Choice)	Medaponnaniyum (Devasuram); Sangeethame Nin Poonchirakil (Meen); Padakaali (Yodha); Enundodi (Celluloid)	A Wow; A Wow; A Extreme	9 October 2019	Adithyan Pradeep, Sreebhuvan R
Anuradha Sriram sang "Malarodu Malaringu" from Bombay before the Audience Choice song by Sivani B Sanjeev.
355	348	PK Suryanarayanan (Performance Round); Koushik S Vinod, Nehal V Ranjith (Duet Round); Vaishnavy KV, Sivani B Sanjeev (Duet Round); Aavani P Hareesh (Audience Choice)	Amme Amme (Valkannadi); Vellinila Thullikalo (Varnapakittu); Pon Kasavu (Joker); Paathiramazha (Ulladakkam)	A Double Wow; A Triple Wow; A Wow	10 October 2019	Koushik S Vinod, Nehal V Ranjith
The episode started with a song by Shakthisree Gopalan – "Naan Nee" from Madras.
356	349	Soorya Mahadevan Pillai (Performance Round); Sreehari PV (Performance Round); Theertha Sathyan Kottaykkal, Aditi Dinesh Nair (Duet Round); Krishnadiya Ajith (Audience Choice)	Saubhaagyam (Pattanapravesham); Thenmazayo (Daisy); Megharagam Nerukil (Kakkakuyil); Minungum Minnaminuge (Oppam)	A Double Wow; A Ultimate; A Extreme	11 October 2019	Theertha Sathyan Kottaykkal, Aditi Dinesh Nair
357	350	Sneha Johnson (Performance Round); Seethalakshmi Prakash; Vaishnavy Panicker, Devika Sumesh (Duet Round); Ananya Dinesh Nair (Audience Choice)	Onnanam Kunninmel (Mayilpeeli); Enthinu Veroru Sooryodayam (Mazhayethum Munpe); Ayala Porichathundu (Venalil Oru Mazha); Cheerapoovukal (Dhanam)	A Wow; A Triple Wow; A Extreme	12 October 2019	Vaishnavy Panicker, Devika Sumesh
The episode opened with an evergreen song by Biju Narayanan – "Mamangam Palakuri Kondadi". The episode had audience from Ambalappuzha Mudampadi Residents' Association who had made paal (milk) payasam for the participants and crew of the show.
358	351	Nehal V Ranjith, Aditi Dinesh Nair (Performance Round); Krishnadiya Ajith; Jennifer Alice, Thejus K (Duet Round); Soorya Mahadevan Pillai (Audience Choice)	Kithachethum Kaatte (Hitler); Neela Ponmane (Nellu); Onnanam Kunnin Mele (Kilichundan Mampazham); Aaraattinaanakal (Sasthram Jayichu Manushyan Thottu)	A Triple Wow; A Wow; A Extreme	13 October 2019	Jennifer Alice, Thejus K
Shakthisree Gopalan sang "Kaattil Veezha" from Uyare after the introductions for the episodes.
359	352	Vaishnavy KV (Performance Round); Rituraj (Performance Round); Sivani B Sanjeev, Thejus K (Duet Round); Sreehari PV (Audience Choice)	Ramayanakatte (Abhimanyu); Thankathala Thaalam (Ennennum Kannettante); Swayamvara Chandrike (Chronic Bachelor); Vellaaram Kunnummele (Revathikkoru Pavakkutty)	A Ultimate; A Extreme; A Double Wow	14 October 2019	Rituraj
Anuradha Sriram sang "Neeyilla Neram" from Luca along with Aditi Dinesh Nair, Jennifer Alice, Adithyan Pradeep and Sreebhuvan R as backing vocals before the Audience Choice song by Sreehari PV.
360	353	Aavani P Hareesh (Favorite Round); Vaishnavy Panicker (Vayalar Round); Soorya Mahadevan Pillai (Performance Round); Vaishnavy KV (Audience Choice)	Kathodu Kathoram (Kathodu Kathoram); Kaanaan Nalla Kinaavukal (Bharya); Enniyenni Chakkakkuru (Vamanapuram Bus Route); Thankathoni (Mazhavilkavadi)	A Extreme; A Wow; A Wow	15 October 2019	Aavani P Hareesh
One of the viewers of the show donated ₹35,000 in memory of her deceased son, to Vaishnavy Panicker. The amount was handed over to Vaishnavy by judge M. G. Sreekumar. Vidhu Prathap sang "Innumente Kannuneeril" from Yuvajanotsavam before the Audience Choice performance by Vaishnavy KV.
362	354	Seethalakshmi Prakash (Favorite Round); Koushik S Vinod (Performance Round); Krishnadiya Ajith; Nehal V Ranjith (Audience Choice)	Swapnaadanam (Thulavarsham); Swarnathaamara Kiliye (D.I.S.C.O.) (Ee Thanalil Ithiri Nerum); Kizhakku Kizhakku (Daaham); Muthuchippi Poloru (Thattathin Marayathu)	A Triple Wow; A Double Wow; A Wow	16 October 2019	Koushik S Vinod
The episode opened with a song by Anuradha Sriram – "Paadariyen" from Sindhu Bhairavi.
363	355	Adithyan Pradeep; Sreehari PV (Vayalar Round); Nehal V Ranjith (Performance Round); Seethalakshmi Prakash (Audience Choice)	Mangalam Nerunnu (Hridayam Oru Kshethram); Thankathalikayil Pongalumaay Vanna (Gayathri); Theyyam Theyyam Thare (Neela Ponman); Thenum Vayambum (Thenum Vayambum)	A Ultimate; A Wow; A Triple Wow	17 October 2019	Nehal V Ranjith
The episode opened with a song by Vidhu Prathap and Anuradha Sriram – "Mounam Swaramaay" from Aayushkalam.
364	356	Koushik S Vinod; Aditi Dinesh Nair; Jennifer Alice (Performance Round); Sreebhuvan R (Audience Choice)	Thalirvalayo (Cheenavala); Aathirakkulirulla (Madhuvidhu); Varna Vrindaavanam (Kaliyoonjal); Aakasha Gopuram (Kalikkalam)	A Wow; A Wow; A Wow	18 October 2019	Aditi Dinesh Nair
The episode opened with a song by Vidhu Prathap – "Vaachalam En Mounavum" from Koodum Thedi.

=== Top Actor Lalettan With Top Singers ===
Padma Bhushan Lt. Col. Mohanlal was the chief guest for the Onam celebrations for Top Singer in 2019. The show was fully telecast on 11 September 2019 and parts of the show was split and re-telecast over the next few days.

No. overall	No. in season	Singers	Songs	Original release date
326	1	Thejus K; Jennifer Alice, Sneha Johnson; Mohanlal; PK Suryanarayanan, Aavani P Hareesh; Krishnadiya Ajith	Kallipoonkuyile (Thenmavin Kombath), Etho Nidrathan (Ayal Kadha Ezhuthukayanu); Vellara Poomala Mele (Varavelpu); Unnikale Oru Kadha Parayam (Unnikale Oru Kadha Parayam); Kudamullappoovinum (Jwala); Onathumbi Onathumbi (Mudiyanaya Puthran)	11 September 2019
The episode opened with the mass entry of "The Complete Actor" – Mohanlal. He also sang a song – "Onappoove" (Ee Ganam Marakkumo) to open the performances for the episode. All the participants presented a dance performance for the celebrity guest of the day – Mohanlal. The episode also featured the participants have the traditional Onasadya and later playing outdoor games that are typically played during Onam celebrations. Adithyan Pradeep, Thejus K, Sreebhuvan R, Aavani P Hareesh and Nehal V Ranjith performed a dance along with the dance crew. M. G. Sreekumar also sang a fast Onam-related song.
327	2	Mohanlal; Vaishnavy Panicker, Vaishnavy KV; Devika Sumesh, Rituraj; Nehal V Ranjith, Seethalakshmi Prakash; Aditi Dinesh Nair; Vidhu Prathap, Soorya Mahadevan Pillai; Mohanlal; Vidhu Prathap, Anuradha Sriram; Adithyan Pradeep, Sreebhuvan R	Etho Nidrathan (Ayal Kadha Ezhuthukayanu); Thiruvonappularithan (Thiruvonam); Kaithappoovin (Kannezhuthi Pottum Thottu); Kaithappoo Manamenthe (Sneham); Ootypattanam (Kilukkam); Kuttanadan (Kaazhcha); Kilukil Pamparam (Kilukkam); Paraniraye (Thiruvona Kaineettam); Thu Badi Maasha Allah (His Highness Abdullah)	12 September 2019
The episode opened with the mass entry of "The Complete Actor" – Mohanlal. The female participants of the show performed a dance along with the dance crew. Koushik and friends, along with the dance crew performed a dance in the episode.
329	4	Adithyan Pradeep, Sivani B Sanjeev; Mohanlal, Sneha Johnson; Sreebhuvan R, Vaishnavy KV; Theertha Sathyan Kottaykkal, Aditi Dinesh Nair; Rituraj; Jaiden Philip, Thejus K; Mohanlal	Thiruvaavaniraavu (Jacobinte Swargarajyam); Ezhilam Paala Poothu (Kaadu); Poovenam (Oru Minnaminunginte Nurunguvettam); Poovili Poovili Ponnonamaayi; Amma Mazhakkarinu (Madampi); Uthraada Poonilave Vaa; Aamarameemarathil (Doore Doore Oru Koodu Koottam)	14 September 2019
The episode opened with the mass entry of "The Complete Actor" – Mohanlal. M. G. Sreekumar opened the performances for the episode with a song from Oppam – "Minungum Minnaminuge". Sivani presented a portrait of Mohanlal that she drew for him. Vidhu Prathap and the junior kids performed Mohanlal's anthem song – "Nenjinakathu Nenju Virichu". The Top Band played instrumentals from different classic songs.
330	5	Rituraj; Sreehari PV; Nehal V Ranjith, Vidhu Prathap; Mohanlal, Ananya Dinesh Nair; Krishnadiya Ajith, Vaishnavy Panicker; Adithyan Pradeep, M. G. Sreekumar, Choir; Mohanlal; M. G. Sreekumar, Mohanlal; Mohanlal, Vaishnavy Panicker	Akale Onam Pularumbol; Pookkacha Manjakacha; Varmegha Varnante Maaril (Sagara Sangamam); Pandoru Shilpi (Hotel High Range); Konnappoove (Ammaye Kaanaan); Bomma Bomma (Ittymaani: Made in China); Aa Kayyilo, Ee Kayyilo (Raagam); Kakkalakkannamma (Oru Yathramozhi); Kando Kando (Ittymaani: Made in China)	15 September 2019
The episode opened with the mass entry of "The Complete Actor" – Mohanlal. The episode opened with the Top Band playing instrumentals from different classic songs. Sreehari R and Ananya Dinesh Nair performed a dance to the song "Bali Bali Bahubali" from Baahubali 2: The Conclusion. The episode also featured dignitaries representing the sponsors honor the chief guest Mohanlal with the customary "Ponnada".

=== Top Singers with Manju Warrier ===
Manju Warrier was the chief guest for the Christmas celebrations for Top Singer in 2019.
