= O Kala =

2023 Indian drama film

- Directed by: Deepak Kolipaka
- Written by: Deepak Kolipaka
- Produced by: Aditya Reddy Kamineni; Ranjith Kumar Kodali; Navya Mahesh M
- Starring: Roshni Sahota; Gourish Yeleti
- Cinematography: Akhil Velluri
- Edited by: Satya Giduturi
- Music by: Neelesh Mandalapu
- Production companies: Aham Azmi Films; Eternity Entertainment Un-Ltd
- Release date: 13 April 2023
- Running time: 120 minutes
- Country: India
- Language: Telugu

O Kala is a 2023 Indian Telugu-language drama film written and directed by Deepak Kolipaka. The film was produced by Aditya Reddy Kamineni, Ranjith Kumar Kodali and Navya Mahesh M under the banner of Aham Azmi Films and Eternity Entertainment. It features Roshni Sahota and Gourish Yeleti in lead roles. The film was released on Disney+ Hotstar on 13 April 2023.

== Cast ==
- Roshni Sahota as Harika
- Gourish yeleti
- Prachi thakker
- Ali
- Gourish Yeleti as Harsha
- Prachi Thaker as Pratyusha
- Devi Prasad
- Viva raghu
- Keshav deepak
- Raviteja nannimala
- Santhosh singuru
- Ravi Shiva teja

== Production ==
The first look poster of the film was released on 9 May 2022 in the presence of S. S. Rajamouli. The principal photography of the film started in 2022.

== Soundtrack ==
O Kala

Soundtrack album by Neelesh Mandalapu
- Released: 2023
- Genre: Feature film soundtrack
- Length: 17:20
- Language: Telugu
- Label: Aditya Music

Track listing
| No. | Title | Music | Singer(s) | Length |
|---|---|---|---|---|
| 1. | "Entha Sokugadu" | Neelesh Mandalapu | Hemachandra Vedala | 3:56 |
| 2. | "O Kala" | Neelesh Mandalapu | Chinmayi Sripada | 5:41 |
| 3. | "Selayeti" | Neelesh Mandalapu | Nikhita Gandhi, Abhay Jodhpurkar, Arun Kaundinya | 4:15 |
| 4. | "Tholimanchule" | Neelesh Mandalapu | Abhay Jodhpurkar, Wrisha Dutta | 3:28 |
| Total length: | | | | 17:20 |

== Reception ==
Satya Pulagam of ABP Desam awarded the series 2.5/5 stars. Omprakash Vaddi of NTV gave it a rating of 2.5/5 stars. Avad Mohammad of OTTPlay rated the series 3/5 stars.
