= Roshni Sahota =

Indian television and film actress

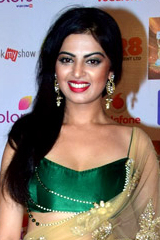
- Born: Roshni Sahota; Delhi, India
- Occupations: Television actress, model
- Years active: 2012–present

Roshni Sahota is an Indian television and film actress. She is best known for her role as Surbhi Singh in Shakti - Astitva Ke Ehsaas Ki, a popular TV soap that airs on Colors TV.

== Filmography ==
=== Television ===
Year	Title	Role	Network	Ref
2014	Nadaan Parindey Ghar Aaja	Minty	Life OK	
2015	Krishan Kanhaiya	Phool		
2015	Phir Bhi Na Maane...Badtameez Dil	Rati	StarPlus	
2016–18	Shakti – Astitva Ke Ehsaas Ki	Surbhi Singh	Colors TV	
2019	Laal Ishq	Jhumri	&TV	
2019	Patiala Babes	Imarti Chautala	Sony Entertainment Television	
2020	State of Siege: 26/11		ZEE5	
2022	Bindiya Sarkar	Megha	Dangal	

=== Films ===
Year	Title	Role	Language	Ref
2016	Kuknoos		Punjabi	
2017	The Great Sardaar		Punjabi	
2023	O Kala	Harika	Telugu	
2025	Nidurinchu Jahapana	Madhura	Telugu	

== See also ==
- List of Hindi television actresses
- List of Indian television actresses
