= Vivahitha =

- Poster
- Directed by: M. Krishnan Nair
- Screenplay by: Thoppil Bhasi
- Produced by: A. L. Sreenivasan
- Starring: Prem Nazir; Sathyan; Padmini; Sukumari
- Cinematography: V. Selvaraj
- Edited by: V. P. Krishnan
- Music by: G. Devarajan
- Production company: ALS Productions
- Distributed by: ALS Productions
- Release date: 11 September 1970
- Country: India
- Language: Malayalam

Vivahitha is a 1970 Indian Malayalam film, directed by M. Krishnan Nair and produced by A. L. Sreenivasan. The film stars Prem Nazir, Sathyan, Padmini and Sukumari in the lead roles. The film had musical score by G. Devarajan. The film was a remake of the Hindi film Gumrah (1963).

== Plot ==
Kamala and Meena are daughters of planter Sreedharan. Kamala is happily married to Ashok, a barrister. Meena is in love with Rajendran, an aspiring singer and painter.

After Kamala dies in a freak accident, Sreedharan asks Meena to marry Ashok to care for Kamala's children. Torn between love and duty, Meena breaks up with Rajendran and marries Ashok. Meena moves in with Ashok and the kids in Madras. She gets introduced to quarrelling couple Suresh and Sukumari. Meena slowly settles into married life.

She meets Rajendran again in a party, where he sings. Rajendran pursues rekindling the romance. Ashok and Rajendran meet up and become friends. Meena rejects Rajendra's multiple advances. A woman called, Leela approaches Meena and introduces herself as Rajendran's wife. She threatens Meena to reveal her relation with Rajendran to Ashok. A fearful Meena tries to calm Leela down. Leela demands money and gifts from Meena for her silence. The blackmailing continues and Meena finally confronts Rajendran, who claims he does not know Leela. Meena contemplates committing suicide. But Leela reappears with Ashok. Leela turns out to be Ashok's secretary and she was acting on his instructions. Ashok, who knew everything, plotted the drama so that Meena learns a lesson. Ashok offers Meena to go with Rajendran. But Meena refuses and ends relationship with Rajendran and goes back to Ashok.

== Cast ==
- Padmini as Meena
- Prem Nazir as Rajendran
- Sathyan as Ashok, a barrister
- Kaviyoor Ponnamma as Kamala, Ashok's first wife
- Sukumari
- Jayabharathi as Sukumari
- Adoor Bhasi
- Muthukulam Raghavan Pillai
- T. S. Muthaiah as Sreedharan, a planter, Kamala and Meena's father
- Baby Rajani
- K. P. Ummer as Suresh
- Ushakumari
- Mythili

== Soundtrack ==
All lyrics are written by Vayalar Ramavarma; all music is composed by G. Devarajan.

Track listing
No.	Title	Artist(s)	Length
1.	"Arayanname"	K. J. Yesudas
2.	"Devaloka Radhavumaay"	K. J. Yesudas
3.	"Maayaajaalakavaathil"	K. J. Yesudas
4.	"Pachamalayil"	P. Susheela
5.	"Pachamalayil" (Sad)	P. Susheela
6.	"Sumangali Nee Ormikkumo"	K. J. Yesudas
7.	"Vasanthathin Makalallo"	K. J. Yesudas, P. Madhuri
8.	"Vasanthathin Makalallo" (Movie version)	K. J. Yesudas, P. Susheela
