= Guruvayur Kesavan (film) =

- Directed by: Bharathan
- Screenplay by: N. Govindankutty
- Story by: Puthur Unnikrishnan
- Produced by: M. O. Joseph
- Starring: Jayabharathi; Adoor Bhasi; M. G. Soman; Ushakumari
- Cinematography: Ashok Kumar
- Edited by: M. S. Mani
- Music by: G. Devarajan
- Production company: Manjilas
- Release date: 17 November 1977
- Country: India
- Language: Malayalam

Guruvayur Kesavan is a 1977 Indian Malayalam-language film, directed by Bharathan and produced by M. O. Joseph. The film stars Jayabharathi, Adoor Bhasi, Ushakumari, M. G. Soman and Sukumari. It tells the story of Gajarajan Guruvayur Kesavan, a temple elephant belonging to the Guruvayur Temple.

== Plot ==
In a village, an elephant is brought into the Guruvayur temple as a deity. Soon, some villagers begin to show extreme devotion while others indulge in exploitation.

== Cast ==
- Nayarambalam Shivaji as Guruvayoor Keshavan Elephant

=== Actor cast ===
- Ushakumari as Sreedevi Thampuratti
- Jayabharathi as Nandini Kutty
- Adoor Bhasi as Achuthan Nair, Nandini Kutty's father
- M. G. Soman as Unni
- Sukumari as Thampuratti
- Manavalan Joseph as Shop Owner
- Sankaradi as Komunni Nair
- Baby Meena
- Baby Vineetha
- Bahadoor as Thaachunni
- Junior Sheela as Ammalu, Maani Nair's wife
- M. S. Namboothiri
- N. Govindankutty
- Oduvil Unnikrishnan as Maani Nair
- Paravoor Bharathan as Shop Owner
- Thrissur Rajan
- Veeran
- Puthur Unnikrishnan

== Soundtrack ==
The music was composed by G. Devarajan and the lyrics were written by P. Bhaskaran. The track "Navakaabhishekam" was set in raga Arabhi.

Song	Singers
"Dheemtha Thakka"	P. Jayachandran, C. O. Anto, Jolly Abraham
"Innenikku Pottukuthaan"	P. Madhuri
"Maarimukilin"	P. Madhuri
"Navakaabhishekam Kazhinju"	K. J. Yesudas
"Soorya Spardhi Kireedam"	K. J. Yesudas
"Sundara Swapname"	K. J. Yesudas, P. Leela
"Ushaakiranangal"	K. J. Yesudas
