= Madanolsavam =

- Poster
- Directed by: N. Sankaran Nair
- Written by: N. Shankaran Nair
- Produced by: R. M. Subbiah
- Starring: Kamal Haasan; Jayan; Zarina Wahab; Thikkurisi Sukumaran Nair
- Cinematography: J. Williams
- Edited by: Babu
- Music by: Salil Chowdhury
- Production company: R.M.S. Pictures
- Distributed by: Vijaya Movies
- Release date: 26 January 1978
- Country: India
- Language: Malayalam

Madanolsavam is a 1978 Indian Malayalam-language romantic drama film written and directed by N. Sankaran Nair and starring Kamal Haasan, Jayan and Zarina Wahab. Dialogues and comedy scenes were written by Thoppil Bhasi. The film was partially remade in Telugu-language as Amara Prema by T. Rama Rao with Kamal and Zarina reprising their roles from the original. The film was dubbed into Tamil as Paruva Mazhai and into Hindi as Dil Ka Sathi Dil. The film is an unofficial remake of an English movie named Love story (1970) and coincidentally Superhit Hindi movie Ankhiyon Ke Jharokhon Se came out the same year made by Rajshree Productions that also took inspirations from English movie Love Story (1970). Zareena Wahab have also worked in some films of Rajshree Productions.

== Cast ==
- Kamal Haasan as Raju
- Jayan as Dr. Jayakrishnan
- Zarina Wahab as Elizabeth
- Thikkurissy Sukumaran Nair as Ambadi Rajasekharan Thampi
- Sankaradi as D'Cruz
- Meena as Mariyamma
- Adoor Bhasi as Frederick March
- Prathapachandran as Dr. Radhakrishnan
- Mallika Sukumaran as Rajasekharan Thampi's wife
- Sreelatha Namboothiri
- Kottayam Santha
- P. K. Abraham
- Pattom Sadan
- Usharani

== Production ==
Madanolsavam was directed by N. Sankaran Nair, produced by R. M. Sundaram under production banner R.M.S. Pictures. The film dialogue written by Thoppil Bhasi. It was the first Malayalam film of Zarina Wahab, she played Kamal's wife. The final length of the film was 4,350.50 metres (14,273.3 ft).

== Soundtrack ==
Madanolsavam

Soundtrack album by Salil Chowdhury
- Released: 1978
- Genre: Feature film soundtrack
- Language: Malayalam
- Label: Saregama
External audio
- Official Audio Jukebox on YouTube

The soundtrack album and background score for Madanolsavam were composed by Salil Chowdhury with Malayalam lyrics by O. N. V. Kurup.

Malayalam
No.	Title	Lyrics	Singer(s)	Length
1.	"Mada Prave Vaa"	O. N. V. Kurup	K. J. Yesudas
2.	"Sandye Kanneerithende"	O. N. V. Kurup	S. Janaki
3.	"Mele Poomala"	O. N. V. Kurup	K. J. Yesudas, Sabita Chowdhury
4.	"Ee Malarkanyakal"	O. N. V. Kurup	S. Janaki
5.	"Nee Mayum Nilavo"	O. N. V. Kurup	K. J. Yesudas
6.	"Sagarame Santhamaka Nee"	O. N. V. Kurup	K. J. Yesudas

This movie was dubbed to Hindi as Dil Ka Sathi Dil with lyrics written by Madhukar.

Hindi
No.	Title	Lyrics	Singer(s)	Length
1.	"Mere Prem Ki Gaaye Ragini"	Madhukar	K. J. Yesudas, S. Janaki
2.	"Chhalke Sanjhke Nainna"	Madhukar	S. Janaki
3.	"Ye Matham Ki Dhun"	Madhukar	K. J. Yesudas
4.	"Hey Mere Dil Ga"	Madhukar	S. Janaki
5.	"Pyar Mein Jo Bhi"	Madhukar	K. J. Yesudas
6.	"Sagar Nidhal Ho Gaya"	Madhukar	K. J. Yesudas

This movie was dubbed to Tamil as Paruva Mazhai with lyrics written by Kannadasan.

Tamil
No.	Title	Singer(s)	Length
1.	"Maadapuraave Vaa"	K. J. Yesudas
2.	"Then Malar Kannigal Maaranai Nesikkum"	S. Janaki
3.	"Kaalamagal Medai Nadagam"	K. J. Yesudas
4.	"Ange Senkathir"	S. Janaki
5.	"Kaadhal Sangame"	K. J. Yesudas, S. Janaki
6.	"Nee Theeyum"	K. J. Yesudas

The partially remade (and the remainder portions dubbed) Telugu version featured 4 songs which were sung by S. P. Balasubrahmanyam & P. Susheela.

Telugu
No.	Title	Length
1.	"Bujji Babu Kavala"
2.	"Ee Priyuraliki Pelle"
3.	"Paala Mabbula"
4.	"Baala Paavurama"

== Release and reception ==
Madanolsavam was released on 26 January 1978. This film was given an "U" (Unrestricted) certificate by the Central Board of Film Certification. At the Kerala State Film Awards 1977–78, O. N. V. Kurup won in the Best Lyricist, and S. Janaki in Best Female Playback Singer.

== Other versions ==
Madanolsavam was remade in Telugu as Amara Prema by T. Rama Rao with Kamal and Zarina reprising their roles from the original. Actress Savitri acted Telugu version. Only a few scenes in the film Amara Prema were remade and most of the scenes dubbed from the original version of the Madanolsavam. Amara Prema was released on 1 July 1978.

Madanolsavam was dubbed into Tamil as Paruva Mazhai released on 14 April 1978, and into Hindi as Dil Ka Sathi Dil released on 1982.
