= Kottaaram Vilkkaanundu =

- Directed by: K. Suku
- Written by: Jagathy N. K. Achari
- Screenplay by: Jagathy N. K. Achari
- Produced by: Jameena
- Starring: Prem Nazir; Jayabharathi; KP Ummer; Bahadoor; Adoor Bhasi; Thikkurissy Sukumaran Nair
- Cinematography: Melli Irani
- Edited by: M. S. Mani
- Music by: G. Devarajan
- Production company: Suvarna Films
- Distributed by: Suvarna Films
- Release date: 23 May 1975
- Country: India
- Language: Malayalam

Kottaaram Vilkkaanundu is a 1975 Indian Malayalam-language film, directed by K. Suku and produced by Jameena. The film stars Prem Nazir, Jayabharathi, Bahadoor, KP Ummer, Adoor Bhasi and Thikkurissy Sukumaran Nair. The film has musical score by G. Devarajan.

== Cast ==
- Prem Nazir
- Jayabharathi
- Bahadoor
- K. P. Ummer
- Adoor Bhasi
- Thikkurissy Sukumaran Nair
- Sreelatha Namboothiri
- T. R. Omana
- Kunchan

== Soundtrack ==
All lyrics are written by Vayalar Ramavarma; all music is composed by G. Devarajan.

No.	Title	Artist(s)	Length
1.	"Bhagavaan Bhagavaan"	Ayiroor Sadasivan, Srikanth	3:17
2.	"Chandrakalabham"	K. J. Yesudas	3:16
3.	"Chandrakalabham"	P. Madhuri	5:12
4.	"Janmadinam Janmadinam"	P. Madhuri, Ayiroor Sadasivan, Chorus	3:22
5.	"Neelakkannukalo... Thottene Njan"	P. Jayachandran, P. Madhuri	4:55
6.	"Sukumaara Kalakal"	K. J. Yesudas	3:10
7.	"Whisky Kudikkaan"	P. Jayachandran	3:15
