= Ayaal Kadhayezhuthukayanu =

- Directed by: Kamal
- Written by: Story: Siddique; Screenplay & Dialogues: Sreenivasan
- Produced by: P. A. Latheef; Vindhyan
- Starring: Mohanlal; Sreenivasan; Nandini; Innocent; Siddique
- Cinematography: P. Sukumar
- Edited by: K. Rajagopal
- Music by: Raveendran(Songs); C. Rajamani (Score)
- Production company: Kalinga Vision
- Distributed by: Swargachitra Release
- Release date: 23 December 1998
- Country: India
- Language: Malayalam

Ayaal Kadhayezhuthukayanu (transl. He is writing the story) is a 1998 Indian Malayalam-language black comedy film directed by Kamal and written by Sreenivasan based on a story by Siddique. The plot follows the travails of an eccentric and wasted pulp fiction writer, Sagar Kottapuram (Mohanlal), and his friend Ramakrishnan (Sreenivasan), who are dragged into a lawsuit by a vengeful Tahsildar, S. Priyadarshini (Nandini). The film features songs composed by Raveendran and background score by C. Rajamani.

== Plot ==
Ramakrishnan, a newly appointed Tahsildar in the city, comes to take charge but is blocked by the incumbent Tahsildar, S. Priyadarshini. Priyadarshini is a strict and rude officer and is much hated by the staff and associates in the Taluk Office. So they readily offer to help Ramakrishnan arrange a house next to Priyadarshini's house for him to stay in the interim. Meanwhile, Sagar Kottapuram, an eccentric and popular pulp fiction novelist and a friend of Ramakrishnan, comes to stay with him. But he mistakenly enters Priyadarshini's house, completely drunk, and sleeps in her bed. When Priyadarshini comes home, she mistakes him to be a thief and calls the police, who arrest him. But the local Sub Inspector of Police, being a fan of Sagar's novels, lets him off his charges. That night, Sagar gets into a fight with Priyadarshini and vows to get her off her Tahsildar post within 24 hours. The next day Ramakrishnan himself assumes charge as Tahsildar according to Sagar's instruction. When Priyadarshini comes and sees this, she locks him inside the office room. Sagar finds out about this when he calls Ramakrishnan. He informs the press about the Tahsildar being locked inside the room by the former Tahsildar. The press rushes to the scene; the District Collector also arrives and suspends Priyadarshini. Ramakrishnan and Sagar celebrate their victory.

The next day Priyadarshini comes to their house and apologizes. She also invites them for breakfast. During breakfast, Priyadarshini becomes hysterical and tries to kill herself using the table knife. Sagar and Ramakrishnan try to hold her back, but her maid Thresiamma mistaking them to be molesting Priyadarshini, screams and runs out of the house. They get arrested for rape attempt. Mammachen, the owner of 'Manchadi' magazine gets them out on bail. Sagar wants to take revenge but is calmed down by Mammachen and Ramakrishnan. He decides to write a novel titled 'Oru Gazetted Yakshi' portraying the life of a corrupt and seditious Municipal Commissioner with an appearance matching Priyadarshini's to take vengeance against her. After many indirect abuses through the novel, the rape case is heard at the court where Priyadarshini's advocate, K.G. Nambiar reveals that Priyadarshini and Sagar were previously engaged but not married, and that Sagar tried to rape her in revenge for this. But neither knew the truth until then. Sagar then writes his own story in the novel. Years back he had been working in United Arab Emirates and his marriage was arranged with a girl named Priya by his sister, Padmini. But he never gets to see her photograph. When he comes home for the wedding, he hears that she eloped with her lover the day before the wedding. This leaves Sagar heartbroken and he never returns for work and becomes an alcoholic.

Jithu, Priya's cousin, comes to see him, and he reveals that they studied together in a boarding school in Ooty. "Once during their start of vacation, at the farewell party, Priya had accidentally got drunk and become unconscious on their way home. They deboard the bus and while at a hotel, he had got her showered and removed her wet clothes while covering her with a blanket. Priya, after waking up, mistakenly thought that Jithu had violated her and had become mentally disturbed. He also reveals that after she eloped before the wedding, she had come to him and tried to kill him but got transferred to a mental asylum."

Sagar tries to see Priyadarshini but finds out that she's been admitted to a mental asylum. Feeling guilty that he's responsible for her present situation, Sagar asks the doctor and her relatives’ permission to help her heal. They fake a wedding arrangement hoping that would bring her back to normal. On the day after the wedding, when Priya wakes up, she still feels that her life is only haunted by her previous incident with Jithu. She finally accepts that the thoughts of her being violated were made by her mind and acknowledges her love for Sagar.

== Cast ==
- Mohanlal as Vidyasagar/ Sagar Kottappuram, a popular pulp fiction novelist
- Sreenivasan as Ramakrishnan, Sagar's Friend
- Nandini as S. Priyadarshini / Priya Menon
- Krishna as Jithu, Priya's cousin and Ex-Boyfriend
- Innocent as Manchadi Mammachan
- Siddique as Adv. K. G. Nambiar
- Nedumudi Venu as Psychiatrist Dr. Subhash
- Srividya as Padmini, Sagar's Sister
- Devan as Mohanan, Sagar's Brother-in-Law
- Jagadish as Sainuddin, Sagar's Friend
- T. P. Madhavan as S.I. Babu
- Augustine as Roy, Manchadi Magazine's Editor
- Sreejaya Nair as Shobha, Jithu's Wife
- Kulappulli Leela as Thresiamma, Priya's House Servant
- P.A Latheef as Adv. Gopinathan
- Vijayan Peringode as Sagar's Uncle
- James as Ramakrishnan's driver
- Antony Perumbavoor as Storekeeper at Petrol Station
- Salu Kuttanad as Sagar's co-passenger and helper

== Production ==
Soundarya was first approached for the role of Priyadarshani, however, they couldn't finalize on the dates which led to her dropping out of the project. Then they approached Manju Warrier for the role. However, she turned it down due to her marriage with Dileep.

== Soundtrack ==
Ayaal Kadhayezhuthukayanu

Soundtrack album by Raveendran
- Released: 1998
- Genre: Popular music
- Label: Sargam Speed Audios; Satyam Audios

The film score was composed by Rajamani while the songs of this film were written by Kaithapram Damodaran Namboothiri and composed by maestro Raveendran. The song Etho Nidrathan by K. J. Yesudas become highly popular and won him the Kerala State Film Award for Best Male Playback Singer.

No.	Song	Singer(s)	Raga
1	"Maane"	K. J. Yesudas	Abheri
2	"Aakasha Thamara"	K. J. Yesudas, Mano, K. S. Chithra	Yamunakalyani
3	"Marathaka Raavin"	K. J. Yesudas	Natabhairavi
4	"Etho Nidrathan"	K. J. Yesudas	Mohanam
5	"Kuppivala"	M. G. Sreekumar, Sujatha Mohan	Mohanam
6	"Etho Nidrathan"	K. J. Yesudas, Sujatha Mohan	Mohanam
7	"Thinkaloru"	K. S. Chithra	

== Release ==
The film released on 23 December 1998 and was a commercial success. A critic from Deccan Herald wrote "A weak storyline that drags through the first half is held alive by some witty dialogues and some very good acting by Kausalya." In a 2021 interview with Safari TV, Siddique stated that the film had a great opening however could not continue its success and turned out to be an average grosser at the box office." Film completed 100 days in Eranakulam kavitha, Thiruvananthapuram Kalabhavan and kodungaloor mughal theatres respectively
