= Thekkan Kattu =

- Directed by: J. Sasikumar
- Written by: Muttathu Varkey; Thoppil Bhasi (dialogues)
- Screenplay by: Thoppil Bhasi
- Produced by: R. S. Prabhu
- Starring: Madhu; Sharada; Sukumari; KPAC Lalitha
- Cinematography: T. N. Krishnankutty Nair
- Edited by: G. Venkittaraman
- Music by: A. T. Ummer
- Production company: Sree Rajesh Films
- Distributed by: Sree Rajesh Films
- Release date: 30 November 1973
- Country: India
- Language: Malayalam

Thekkan Kattu (transl. Southern Wind) is a 1973 Indian Malayalam film, directed by J. Sasikumar and produced by R. S. Prabhu. The film stars Madhu, Sharada, Sukumari and KPAC Lalitha in the lead roles. The film had musical score by A. T. Ummer.

== Cast ==
- Madhu as Babu
- Sharada as Sosamma
- Sukumari as Shyamala Khanna
- KPAC Lalitha as Gowri
- Adoor Bhasi as Gopalan
- Sujatha as Annakkutty
- Jose Prakash as Annakkutty's Husband
- Sankaradi as Gowri's Father
- Paul Vengola
- Adoor Bhavani as Babu's Mother
- Kaduvakulam Antony as Kunjeli's Husband
- Kottarakkara Sreedharan Nair as Chacko
- Kunchan
- Meena as Sosamma's Mother
- Rajakokila as Shyamala Khanna's Daughter
- S. P. Pillai as Babu's Father
- Master Raghu

== Soundtrack ==
All lyrics are written by P. Bhaskaran except where noted; all music is composed by A. T. Ummer.

No.	Title	Lyrics	Artist(s)	Length
1.	"En Nottam Kaanaan"		L. R. Eswari
2.	"Neela Meghangal"		P. Jayachandran
3.	"Neeye Sharanam"		Adoor Bhasi, Choir
4.	"Orkkumbol"		P. Susheela
5.	"Priyamullavale"		K. P. Brahmanandan
6.	"Varillennu Chollunnu"		S. Janaki
7.	"Yerusaleminte Nandini"	Bharanikkavu Sivakumar	K. J. Yesudas
