= Sasthram Jayichu Manushyan Thottu =

1973 film by A. B. Raj

- Poster
- Directed by: A. B. Raj
- Written by: G. Vivekanandan; S. L. Puram Sadanandan (dialogues)
- Screenplay by: S. L. Puram Sadanandan
- Produced by: T. E. Vasudevan
- Starring: Prem Nazir; Jayabharathi; Adoor Bhasi; Thikkurissy Sukumaran Nair
- Cinematography: Balu Mahendra
- Edited by: B. S. Mani
- Music by: V. Dakshinamoorthy
- Production company: Jaya Maruthi
- Distributed by: Jaya Maruthi
- Release date: 5 October 1973
- Country: India
- Language: Malayalam

Sasthram Jayichu Manushyan Thottu (transl. Science won, mankind lost) is a 1973 Indian Malayalam-language film directed by A. B. Raj and produced by T. E. Vasudevan. The film stars Prem Nazir, Jayabharathi, Adoor Bhasi and Thikkurissy Sukumaran Nair. The film had musical score by V. Dakshinamoorthy . This is the first Malayalam Film to introduce Hindustan 16mm Camera

== Cast ==
- Prem Nazir as Prakash
- Jayabharathi as Sulochana
- Adoor Bhasi as Ramakrishnan
- Thikkurissy Sukumaran Nair as Doctor
- Sankaradi as Kurup
- T. R. Omana as Prakash's Mother
- Raghavan as Venugopalan
- Paravoor Bharathan as Sulochana's Father
- Paul Vengola as Gopalan
- Radhadevi
- Santha Devi as Sulochana's Mother
- Ushakumari as Suvarna

== Soundtrack ==
All lyrics are written by Sreekumaran Thampi; all music is composed by V. Dakshinamoorthy.

Track listing
No.	Title	Artist(s)	Length
1.	"Aaraattinaanakal"	K. J. Yesudas
2.	"Chandanathil"	P. Jayachandran
3.	"Eerezhulakum"	V. Dakshinamoorthy, S. Janaki
4.	"Ponnin Chinga"	P. Leela, Choir
5.	"Ponnum Thenum"	K. J. Yesudas
6.	"Thaarakaroopini"	K. P. Brahmanandan
